= 1992 Great Britain Lions tour =

- Date: 24 May 1992 – 19 July 1992
- Manager: Maurice Lindsay
- Coach: Mal Reilly
- Tour captain: Ellery Hanley
- Top point scorer: Paul Eastwood (63)
- Top try scorer: Martin Offiah (7)
Summary
P	W	D	L
Total
17	13	0	4
Test match
6	3	0	3
Opponent
P	W	D	L
Papua New Guinea
1	1	0	0
Australia
3	1	0	2
New Zealand
2	1	0	1

Tour chronology
- ← 1990 1996 →

The 1992 Great Britain Lions tour was a tour by the Great Britain national rugby league team, nicknamed the 'Lions', of Papua New Guinea, Australia and New Zealand which took place between May and July 1992. The tour was the last of such length undertaken by the Great Britain team, and included a test match against Papua New Guinea, a three-test series against Australia for The Ashes, and a two-test series against New Zealand for the Baskerville Shield, all interspersed with matches against local club and representative teams.

Taking place following the conclusion of England's 1991–92 Rugby Football League season and during Australia's 1992 Winfield Cup premiership season, the tour led to friction between the Great Britain team's management and the Australian Rugby League over match scheduling and promotion. For the first time ever, a Lions tour was shown live on television in the United Kingdom through Sky Sports. The commentators for the tour were Eddie Hemmings and former Lions World Cup hooker Mike Stephenson who had a greater insight into the Australian game having spent most of the 1970s and 1980s, playing, coaching and commentating in the Sydney premiership. The Lions finished the tour with thirteen wins and four losses and a profit of £244,645. Unfortunately for the Lions, three of their losses came in the Test matches, two against Australia and one against New Zealand with the other loss coming against Sydney club side Parramatta.

== Touring squad ==
A 32-man squad was selected for the tour, including 13 players from Wigan, setting a record for the number of players supplied by one club. One of the Wigan players selected was Andy Gregory, who had announced his international retirement in 1990, but made himself available for selection after being persuaded to reconsider his decision. From the originally selected squad, Leeds scrum-half Bobbie Goulding was dropped due to suspension, and Widnes' Welsh international Jonathan Davies (who had spent part of 1991 playing with Sydney club Canterbury-Bankstown) withdrew from the squad due to injury. Aston, Hulme, Sampson, McNamara, Myers and Harrison were called up during the tour to replace injured players.

Hull F.C. winger Paul Eastwood was the leading point scorer on tour with 58 from 3 tries and 23 goals (he was also the leading goal kicker on tour). Wigan winger Martin Offiah, who before the tour was the undisputed "fastest player in rugby league", was the leading try scorer with 7.

The coach was former Great Britain international Mal Reilly, marking his fourth Lions tour after appearing as a player on the successful 1970 tour and coaching the 1988 and 1990 touring teams. The assistant coach was Widnes coach and the Rugby Football League's Director of Coaching Phil Larder. The team manager was RFL and Wigan President Maurice Lindsay. Ellery Hanley was the tour captain, but due to injury only played in one game on tour. Garry Schofield was subsequently named the Test captain while Featherstone Rovers halfback Deryck Fox was the team captain when either Hanley or Schofield weren't playing.

Name	Club	Apps	Tests	Tries	Goals	Drop goals	Points	Notes
Mark Aston	Sheffield Eagles	4	0	0	0	0	0	
Denis Betts	Wigan	11	6	2	0	0	8	
Paul Broadbent	Sheffield Eagles	2	0	0	0	0	0	
Phil Clarke	Wigan	9	6	3	0	0	12	
Gary Connolly	St Helens	13	4	3	0	0	12	
Neil Cowie	Wigan	5	0	0	0	0	0	
Lee Crooks	Castleford	7	2	0	1	0	2	
Martin Dermott	Wigan	8	4	0	0	0	0	
John Devereux	Widnes	9	1	2	1	0	10	
Paul Eastwood	Hull	9	5	4	23	0	62	
Shaun Edwards	Wigan	10	6	4	0	0	16	
Kevin Ellis	Warrington	8	0	3	0	1	13	
Karl Fairbank	Bradford Northern	11	2	3	0	0	12	
Deryck Fox	Featherstone Rovers	9	0	0	14	0	28	
Andy Gregory	Wigan	5	1	0	0	0	0	
Graeme Hallas	Hull Kingston Rovers	8	0	2	1	0	10	
Steve Hampson	Wigan	7	1	1	0	0	4	
Ellery Hanley	Leeds	1	0	0	0	0	0	
Karl Harrison	Halifax	8	4	0	0	0	0	
Les Holliday	Widnes	3	0	0	0	0	0	
Paul Hulme	Widnes	8	3	0	0	0	0	
Alan Hunte	St Helens	9	0	6	0	0	24	
Lee Jackson	Hull	8	2	1	0	0	4	
Michael Jackson	Wakefield Trinity	8	2	0	0	0	0	
Paul Loughlin	St Helens	5	2	0	7	0	14	
Ian Lucas	Wigan	3	1	0	0	0	0	
Joe Lydon	Wigan	11	5	3	0	1	13	
Billy McGinty	Wigan	9	4	1	0	0	4	
Steve McNamara	Hull	4	0	1	0	0	4	
David Myers	Wigan	4	0	0	0	0	0	
Paul Newlove	Featherstone Rovers	12	5	3	0	0	12	
Sonny Nickle	St Helens	3	1	0	0	0	0	
Martin Offiah	Wigan	7	6	7	0	0	28	
Andy Platt	Wigan	9	6	2	0	0	8	
Daryl Powell	Sheffield Eagles	9	6	0	0	0	0	
Dean Sampson	Castleford	2	0	0	0	0	0	
Garry Schofield	Leeds	9	6	3	0	2	14	
Kelvin Skerrett	Wigan	9	5	1	0	0	4	
Graham Steadman	Castleford	8	5	2	4	0	16	

== Papua New Guinea ==
The first country the touring Lions visited was Papua New Guinea.

Highlands Zone	15 – 24	Great Britain	Danny Leahy Oval, Goroka
Tries: P. Singapar, Gigmai Ongugo; Goals: Gigmai Ongugo (2); A.Tete		Tries: Garry Schofield (2), Paul Eastwood, Denis Betts; Goals: Paul Loughlin (4)	Attendance: 7,000

Islands Zone	22 – 38	Great Britain	Queen Elizabeth Park, Rabaul
Tries: J. Alunga (2), W. Langa; Goals: N. Eremas (4)		Tries: Karl Fairbank (2), Graeme Hallas, Kevin Ellis, Alan Hunte, Joe Lydon, Kelvin Skerrett; Goals: Graham Steadman (3); Deryck Fox (2)	Attendance: 5,000

This match saw the most points scored of any match on the tour.

31 May 1992

Papua New Guinea	14 – 20	Great Britain
Tries: Matthew Elara; Kini Tani; Richard Wagambi; Goals: Aquila Emil		Tries: Martin Offiah (2); Paul Eastwood; Phil Clarke; Goals: Paul Loughlin (2)

Lloyd Robson Oval, Port Moresby
Attendance: 7,294
Referee: Eddie Ward (Australia)

Papua New Guinea	Great Britain

FB	1	Phillip Boge
RW	2	Joshua Kouoru
CE	3	Richard Wagambie
CE	4	August Joseph
LW	5	Kini Tani
FE	6	Aquila Emil
HB	7	Ngala Lapan (c)
PR	8	Ben Biri
HK	9	Michael Matmillo
PR	10	Kera Ngaffin
SR	11	Bobby Ako
SR	12	Joe Gispe
LK	13	Matthew Elara
Substitutions:
IC	14	Korul Sinemau
IC	15	Michael Angara
IC	16	S Kapan
IC	17	Nande Yer
Coach:

FB	1	Steve Hampson
RW	2	Paul Eastwood
CE	3	Garry Schofield (c)
CE	4	Paul Loughlin
LW	5	Martin Offiah
SO	6	Daryl Powell
SH	7	Shaun Edwards
PR	8	Lee Crooks
HK	9	Martin Dermott
PR	10	Andy Platt
SR	11	Denis Betts
SR	12	Karl Fairbank
LF	13	Phil Clarke
Substitutions:
IC	14	Joe Lydon
IC	15	Kelvin Skerrett
IC	16	Paul Newlove
IC	17	Sonny Nickle
Coach:
(England) Mal Reilly

== Australia ==
The Lions next traveled to Australia to contest The Ashes series. The Ashes series attracted 103,419 fans across the three tests, including the first ever Ashes test played in Melbourne. This was the largest Ashes attendance in Australia since 133,791 had attended the 1974 Ashes series and easily eclipsed the 66,792 of 1979, the 75,480 of 1984 and the 67,554 who attended the 1988 series.

The three Ashes series tests took place at the following venues. For the first time an Ashes test was played outside of the traditional rugby league states of New South Wales and Queensland.

Sydney	Melbourne	Brisbane
Sydney Football Stadium	Princes Park	Lang Park
Capacity: 42,500	Capacity: 32,000	Capacity: 32,500

Tuesday, 2 June	Queensland Residents	10 – 14	Great Britain	Townsville Sports Reserve, Townsville
	Tries: Peter Hamilton (1); Goals: Gerard Kerr (3/5)		Tries: Graeme Hallas (1); Billy McGinty (1); Shaun Edwards (1); Goals: John Devereux (1/4); Joe Lydon (0/1); Shaun Edwards (0/1)	Attendance: 4,181; Referee: John Willey

Queensland	Great Britain

FB	1	Brett Schultz
RW	2	Troy White
CE	3	Peter Hamilton
CE	4	Ken Robertson
LW	5	Gerard Kerr
FE	6	Jason Hetherington
HB	7	Craig Grauf (c)
PR	8	Eric Kennedy
HK	9	Kevin Marty
PR	10	Bradley Pike
SR	11	Steele Retchless
SR	12	Matt Clifford
LK	13	Craig Spark
Substitutions:
IC	14	Paul Fisher
IC	15	Neil Smith
IC	16	Steve Mills
IC	17	Steven Bella
Coach:
Ross O'Reilly

FB	1	Joe Lydon
RW	2	Graeme Hallas
RC	3	Gary Connolly
LC	4	Kevin Ellis
LW	5	Alan Hunte
SO	6	Shaun Edwards
SH	7	Andy Gregory (c)
PR	8	Ian Lucas
HK	9	Lee Jackson
PR	10	Neil Cowie
SR	11	Karl Fairbank
SR	12	John Devereux
LF	13	Billy McGinty
Substitutions:
IC	14	Deryck Fox
IC	15	Kelvin Skerrett
IC	16	Paul Newlove
IC	17	Denis Betts
Coach:
(England) Mal Reilly

Saturday, 6 June	Canberra Raiders	12 – 24	Great Britain	Bruce Stadium, Canberra
	Tries: Jason Croker, Michael Spinks; Goals: Ricky Stuart (1); Adam Friend (1)	[ Report]	Tries: Andy Platt (2), Paul Eastwood, Alan Hunte, Paul Newlove; Goals: Paul Loughlin (1); Graham Steadman (1)	Attendance: 4,728; Referee: Greg McCallum

Canberra Raiders	Great Britain

FB	1	Brett Mullins
RW	2	Sean Hoppe
CE	3	Brendan Norton
CE	4	Scott Gale
LW	5	Jason Croker
FE	6	Chris O'Sullivan
HB	7	Ricky Stuart (c)
PR	8	Darrell McDonald
HK	9	Steve Stone
PR	10	David Woods
SR	11	Ian Graham
SR	12	Gary Coyne
LK	13	Craig Bellamy
Substitutions:
IC	14	Adam Friend
IC	15	James Hunt
IC	16	Ken Nagas
IC	17	Michael Spinks
Coach:
(Australia) Tim Sheens

FB	1	Graham Steadman
RW	2	Paul Eastwood
CE	3	Paul Newlove
CE	4	Paul Loughlin
LW	5	Alan Hunte
SO	6	Garry Schofield (c)
SH	7	Andy Gregory
PR	8	Kelvin Skerrett
HK	9	Martin Dermott
PR	10	Andy Platt
SR	11	Denis Betts
SR	12	Michael Jackson
LF	13	Phil Clarke
Substitutions:
IC	14	Les Holliday
IC	15	Deryck Fox
IC	16
IC	17	Gary Connolly
Coach:
(England) Mal Reilly

In what can only be described as bad scheduling, the Lions faced the Canberra Raiders on a Saturday night with the Raiders due to play a club game against Parramatta the next afternoon. This saw Raiders coach Tim Sheens not playing the likes of Australian test players Mal Meninga, Bradley Clyde, Steve Walters and Laurie Daley, as well as David Furner, Phil Blake, Darren Fritz, Brett Hetherington and Paul Osborne. It also saw Canberra go into the match with 7 players on the bench, though Sheens would only use the regulation 4. Andy Gregory served notice of his form by leading the Lions to a 20-6 half time lead, though he aggravated a groin injury when he put in a grubber kick for one of Andy Platt's two tries late in the first half and with the first test less than a week away did not return for the second half.

Monday, 8 June	Illawarra Steelers	10 – 11	Great Britain	Steelers Stadium, Wollongong
	Tries: Ryan Girdler (1); Aaron Whittaker (1); Goals: Ryan Girdler (1/2)		Tries: Graeme Hallas (1); Shaun Edwards (1); Goals: John Devereux (1/2); Field Goals: Kevin Ellis (1/1); Shaun Edwards (0/1)	Attendance: 10,021; Referee: Graham Annesley

Illawarra Steelers	Great Britain

FB	1	Brett Docherty
RW	2	Brendan O'Meara
CE	3	Ryan Girdler
CE	4	Paul McGregor
LW	14	Jonathan Britten
FE	6	Aaron Whittaker
HB	15	Mick Neil
PR	8	Steve Waddell
HK	9	Dean Schifilliti
PR	12	Craig Teitzel
SR	16	Dave Gallagher
SR	11	John Cross (c)
LK	13	Ian Russell
Substitutions:
IC	10	David Walsh
IC	17	Neil Piccinelli
IC	18	Bill Dunn
IC	19	Andrew Pauls
Coach:
(Australia) Graham Murray

FB	1	Steve Hampson
RW	2	John Devereux
CE	3	Gary Connolly
CE	4	Daryl Powell
LW	5	Graeme Hallas
SO	6	Kevin Ellis
SH	7	Shaun Edwards (c)
PR	8	Ian Lucas
HK	9	Lee Jackson
PR	10	Lee Crooks
SR	11	Karl Fairbank
SR	12	Les Holliday
LF	13	Billy McGinty
Substitutions:
IC	14	Alan Hunte
IC	15	Michael Jackson
IC	16	Deryck Fox
IC	17	Neil Cowie
Coach:
(England) Mal Reilly

With the first test only three days after the game, Steelers coach Graham Murray was without the services of goal kicking Australian test winger Rod Wishart. The Steelers, in their first and only game against an international touring side, almost pulled off an upset until a late Kevin Ellis field goal sealed a tense 11–10 win for the tourists.

=== The Ashes series ===
The 1992 Ashes series was the final Ashes series to date played in Australia and attracted 103,459 spectators over the three tests. This compared favourably to the 75,480 aggregate of the 1984 Ashes series in Australia and the 67,554 aggregate of the 1988 series in Australia. A large number of English fans followed their team on the tour, but with Great Britain's wins in the final test of 1988 and the first test of the 1990 series, public interest had risen with Australia, although still winning, proving less dominant than during the 1980s.

After 4 of the previous 5 Ashes series had been controlled by French referees (Julien Rascagneres in 1982 and 1986, Francois Desplas in 1988 and Alain Sablayrolles in 1990 – none of whom spoke any English), which had brought numerous complaints from both sides regarding their incompetency, the Rugby League International Federation, ARL and RFL agreed to the use of New Zealand referee Dennis Hale (who had been a touch judge in the 1988 Rugby League World Cup final) for all three tests.

==== First Test ====
With Ellery Hanley out injured, Mal Reilly appointed five-eighth Garry Schofield as British captain for the first test. The Australians stuck with most of those who had won the 1991 Trans-Tasman Test series against New Zealand, with only winger Michael Hancock in for an injured Willie Carne, prop Glenn Lazarus (for Craig Salvatori) and second rowers Paul Sironen and Bob Lindner returning to the side with Newcastle Knights prop forward Paul Harragon making his test debut. Peter Jackson was also re-called to the side after Dale Shearer who had been selected in the centres had been ruled out with injury. Shearer, who had been widely tipped never to play test football again after a poor Game 1 against New Zealand the previous year, had starred at fullback for Queensland in the State of Origin series and was selected in the centres for all three tests, but was an injury withdrawal on each occasion. Jackson's recall at five-eighth saw Laurie Daley moved to the centres.

Friday, 12 June

Australia	22 – 6	Great Britain
Tries: Mal Meninga (2); Paul Sironen; Michael Hancock; Goals: Rod Wishart (3/6)		Tries: Joe Lydon Goals: Lee Crooks (1/2)

Sydney Football Stadium, Sydney
Attendance: 40,141
Referee: Dennis Hale (New Zealand)
Player of the Match: Bradley Clyde

Australia	Position	Great Britain
Andrew Ettingshausen	FB	Graham Steadman
Rod Wishart	WG	Paul Newlove
Mal Meninga (c)	CE	Daryl Powell
Laurie Daley	CE	Paul Loughlin
Michael Hancock	WG	Martin Offiah
Peter Jackson	FE/SO	Garry Schofield (c)
Allan Langer	HB/SH	Andy Gregory
Paul Harragon	PR	Kelvin Skerrett
Steve Walters	HK	Martin Dermott
Glenn Lazarus	PR	Lee Crooks
Paul Sironen	SR	Denis Betts
Bob Lindner	SR	Andy Platt
Bradley Clyde	LF	Phil Clarke
David Gillespie	Res.	Joe Lydon
Brad Mackay	Res.	Shaun Edwards
Brad Fittler	Res.	Ian Lucas
Kevin Walters	Res.	Michael Jackson
Bob Fulton	Coach	Mal Reilly

Lions winger Martin Offiah made two clean breaks down his left wing in the first half after poor Australian kicks and defence had given him two opportunities to showcase his speed, but he was put into touch by Australian fullback Andrew Ettingshausen on both occasions when only about 15 metres from scoring (despite being probably the quickest player in the Australian team, ET later admitted that had he needed to chase him, Offiah would have had too much pace). The first break came from a sweeping backline movement which saw Offiah into open space. He easily outpaced Allan Langer, but Ettingshausen's desperate push was enough for him to put a foot into touch. On the second occasion, a poor mid-field kick from Langer and poor defence from both Mal Meninga and Rod Wishart who attempted a two-man tackle on Offiah, only to collide with each other and fall off. This again saw him into open space with again only Ettinghausen to beat, but the Australian fullback was equal to the task and easily bundled the flying winger into touch.

The attendance of 40,141 at the Football Stadium was the largest crowd for an Australia vs Great Britain test in Sydney since 55,505 saw the final test of the 1974 Ashes series at the Sydney Cricket Ground. It was also the first test match played since Australia defeated France in front of 50,077 at the Sydney Cricket Ground during 1977 Rugby League World Cup to attract a crowd of over 40,000 in Sydney.

Tuesday 16 June	NSW Country	6 – 24	Great Britain	Pioneer Oval, Parkes
	Tries: John Connolly; Goals: Brian Quinton (1)		Tries: Gary Connolly, Paul Eastwood, Graham Steadman; Goals: Paul Eastwood (6)	Attendance: 8,014; Referee: Steve Albert

NSW Country	Great Britain

FB	1	Paul Beath
RW	2	Scott Roskell
CE	3	John Connelly
CE	4	David Krause
LW	5	Brian Quinton
FE	6	Michael Twigg
HB	7	Tony Price
PR	8	Troy Wilson
HK	9	Trevor Crow (c)
PR	10	Kevin Marr
SR	11	Graeme Tutt
SR	12	Andrew Stephan
LK	13	Alex Corvo
Substitutions:
IC	14	John Crooks
IC	15	Steve Linnane
IC	16	Craig Breen
IC	17	Mark Oldfield
Coach:
(Australia) Frank Fish

FB	1	Steve Hampson
RW	2	Paul Eastwood
CE	3	John Devereux
CE	4	Gary Connolly
LW	5	Alan Hunte
SO	6	Kevin Ellis
SH	7	Deryck Fox (c)
PR	8	Neil Cowie
HK	9	Lee Jackson
PR	10	Karl Fairbank
SR	11	Les Holliday
SR	12	Paul Hulme
LF	13	Billy McGinty
Substitutions:
IC	14	Graham Steadman
IC	15	Paul Loughlin
IC	16	Andy Gregory
IC	17	Joe Lydon
Coach:
(England) Mal Reilly

Friday, 19 June	Parramatta Eels	22 – 16	Great Britain	Parramatta Stadium, Parramatta
	Tries: Mark Laurie (1); Michael Buettner (1); Scott Mahon (1); Stu Galbraith (1); Goals: Michael Buettner (3/4)		Tries: Martin Offiah (2); Shaun Edwards (1); Goals: Paul Eastwood (2/3); Sin Bin: Shaun Edwards (1)	Attendance: 18,220; Referee: Eddie Ward

Parramatta Eels	Great Britain

FB	2	Danny Crnkovich
RW	15	Michael Erickson
CE	14	Scott Mahon
CE	4	Michael Buettner
LW	5	Lee Oudenryn
FE	6	Brett Kenny (c)
HB	7	Stu Galbraith
PR	8	John Fearnley
HK	9	Shane Flanagan
PR	10	Greg Drake
SR	11	Cameron Blair
SR	12	Chris King
LK	13	Mark Laurie
Substitutions:
IC	16	Mark Horo
IC	17	Phil Tiernan
IC	18	Ryan Schofield
IC	19	Robert Muchmore
Coach:
(Australia) Mick Cronin

FB	1	Gary Connolly
RW	2	Paul Eastwood
CE	3	Daryl Powell
CE	4	Paul Newlove
LW	5	Martin Offiah
SO	6	Garry Schofield (c)
SH	7	Shaun Edwards
PR	8	Karl Harrison
HK	9	Martin Dermott
PR	10	Andy Platt
SR	11	Denis Betts
SR	12	Paul Hulme
LF	13	Phil Clarke
Substitutions:
IC	15	Lee Crooks
IC	17	Karl Fairbank
IC
IC
Coach:
(England) Mal Reilly

Lions winger Martin Offiah, generally regarded at the time as the fastest player in rugby league, participated in a highly publicised 100 metre foot race with Parramatta Eels speedster Lee Oudenryn before the tour match against the Eels. With both players decked out in their full football gear, including boots, Offiah's fastest player standing took a beating when Oudenryn (a former soccer player who had only played 5 games of first grade before the Lions game) won by a yard. Rumours soon surfaced (allegedly started by former Kangaroos hooker Benny Elias) that with Offiah the odds-on favourite, a few of his Lions teammates had heavily backed the Eels flyer to win and that Offiah had tanked so they could collect. Offiah would get his revenge later in the night with 2 tries, one a long range try where Oudenryn failed to make ground on him in a 50-metre chase. The match against Parramatta also saw the largest non-test crowd of the Lions tour with 18,220 in attendance. In what was another piece of bad scheduling, this game on a Friday night was played only two days before the Eels were due to play a club game against Manly Warringah.

Tuesday, 23 June	Newcastle Knights	0 – 22	Great Britain	Marathon Stadium, Newcastle
	Tries: Goals:		Tries: Alan Hunte (2); Joe Lydon (1); Karl Fairbank (1); Goals: Deryck Fox (3/3); John Devereux (0/2)	Attendance: 9,758; Referee: Bill Harrigan

Newcastle Knights	Great Britain

FB	1	Robbie O'Davis
RW	2	Tony Herman
CE	3	John Schuster
CE	4	David Smith
LW	5	Shane Mackley
FE	6	Michael Hagan (c)
HB	7	Matthew Rodwell
PR	8	Mark Sargeant
HK	9	Max Chapman
PR	10	Sam Stewart
SR	11	Glenn Miller
SR	12	David Mullane
LK	13	Marc Glanville
Substitutions:
IC	14	Robbie McCormack
IC	15	Steve Fulmer
IC	16	Wayne Richards
IC	17	Steve Crowe
Coach:
(Australia) David Waite

FB	1	Joe Lydon
LW	2	Alan Hunte
CE	3	Gary Connolly
CE	4	John Devereux
RW	5	Graeme Hallas
SO	6	Kevin Ellis
SH	7	Deryck Fox
PR	8	Karl Harrison
HK	9	Lee Jackson
PR	10	Paul Broadbent
SR	11	Michael Jackson
SR	12	Steve McNamara
LF	13	Ellery Hanley (c)
Substitutions:
IC	14	Mark Aston
IC	15	Paul Hulme
IC	16	David Myers
IC	17	Karl Fairbank
Coach:
(England) Mal Reilly

Against a strong Newcastle side that was missing only Australian test front rower Paul Harragon, the Lions achieved their only clean sheet of the tour with a 22–0 win at the Marathon Stadium. Winger Alan Hunte, reportedly the third fastest player in the squad behind only Martin Offiah and Graham Steadman, grabbed 2 tries in the win.

==== Second Test ====
For the second test Britain fielded an all-Wigan forward pack, and with Andy Gregory injured, Shaun Edwards came in at scrum half-back for his first start against the Australians in test football. The Australians went in with an almost unchanged side, though David Gillespie came into the front row with Glenn Lazarus moving to the bench and Chris Johns came into the side for Brad Fittler who was unavailable for personal reasons (Fittler's Penrith Panthers teammate Ben Alexander, the younger brother of Penrith captain and former Australian test halfback Greg Alexander, was killed in a motor vehicle accident 5 days prior to the test).

The game saw Australian captain Mal Meninga playing his 13th Ashes series test match, equalling the record number of Ashes tests by an Australian held by Keith Holman.

The match, played at the Princes Park Australian rules football ground under temporary lighting, was the first ever Ashes test in Australia played in Melbourne. The cold, wet conditions suited the Lions who levelled the series with a resounding 33-10 win after going into half-time with a 22-0 lead in front of 31,005 fans.

Friday, 26 June

Australia	10 – 33	Great Britain
Tries: Bob Lindner; Chris Johns Goal: Mal Meninga (1)		Tries: Phil Clarke; Paul Newlove; Garry Schofield; Graham Steadman; Martin Offiah; Goals: Paul Eastwood (6/7); Field goal: Garry Schofield

Princes Park, Melbourne
Attendance: 31,005
Referee: Dennis Hale (New Zealand)
Player of the Match: Garry Schofield

Australia	Position	Great Britain
Andrew Ettingshausen	FB	Graham Steadman
Rod Wishart	WG	Paul Eastwood
Laurie Daley	CE	Daryl Powell
Mal Meninga (c)	CE	Paul Newlove
Michael Hancock	WG	Martin Offiah
Peter Jackson	FE/SO	Garry Schofield (c)
Allan Langer	HB/SH	Shaun Edwards
David Gillespie	PR	Kelvin Skerrett
Steve Walters	HK	Martin Dermott
Paul Harragon	PR	Andy Platt
Paul Sironen	SR	Denis Betts
Bob Lindner	SR	Billy McGinty
Bradley Clyde	LF	Phil Clarke
Brad Mackay	Res.	Joe Lydon
Glenn Lazarus	Res.	Paul Hulme
Kevin Walters	Res.	Gary Connolly
Chris Johns	Res.	Karl Harrison
Bob Fulton	Coach	Mal Reilly

The second test, played on a cold and wet night at Melbourne's Princes Park, saw Australian captain Mal Meninga equal Reg Gasnier's record of 36 tests for Australia. It turned out that the conditions (as well as the slippery surface), suited the Lions with many claiming it was more like English weather than Australian.

The British got off to a 4–0 lead after some penalties kicked by Paul Eastwood early in the first half. A brawl started by Australian forward Paul Harragon got the Lions another penalty and they decided to attack the Kangaroos' line. From the resulting good field position, first receiver Philip Clarke was able to throw a dummy and make a break through the defensive line to dive over for the first try of the match. It was then converted by Eastwood, so the visitors led 10–0. The next try for Great Britain came when replacement half Shaun Edwards got the ball mid-field and made a break before kicking it ahead into Australia's in-goal area. Several players from both sides came racing through to dive on the ball but the Lions' Paul Newlove was the only one who got his hand on it. Next, Garry Schofield scored a brilliant individual try when he chipped ahead from about fifteen metres out and after running into Australian second rower Paul Sironon, then beat the Australian defence to dive on it after Andrew Ettingshausen went what television commentator Graeme Hughes called "ice skating" on the slippery in-goal surface. Great Britain thus went into the break leading 22–0.

With Ettingshausen having footing and confidence problems on the slippery surface, Australian coach Bob Fulton took the extraordinary step of moving ET to the wing to replace an injured Rod Wishart with Chris Johns coming in to play in the centres and Laurie Daley dropping back to fullback. Schofield kicked a drop goal to open the scoring in the second half, making it 23 nil. Australia then got their first try fifteen minutes into the second half when Bob Lindner got the ball at first receiver close to the line and reached out from the tackle to touch the ball down. The next try came from Chris Johns who ran onto replacement half Kevin Walters' pass from about fifteen metres out through a gap in the defence to score (like Wishart, Peter Jackson had gone off injured with Walters on to play 5/8). Back in Australia's half, British fullback Graham Steadman got the ball at first receiver about twenty metres out and outpaced Andrew Ettingshausen down the right sideline to score in the corner, sealing the match for the tourists (according to Lions team manager Maurice Lindsay, Steadman was second only to Offiah for pace in the Great Britain squad). The British then added to their score when Schofield got the ball around mid-field, chipped it over the defence and regarthered it. He found Martin Offiah in support and unlike in Sydney, the speedy winger this time beat Ettingshausen in a race for the left corner. This left the final score at 33–10, equalling Great Britain's largest ever winning margin over Australia as well as being Australia's second-largest ever losing margin.

Tuesday, 30 June	Gold Coast Seagulls	10 – 28	Great Britain	Seagulls Stadium, Tweed Heads
	Tries: Ray Herring (2); Goals: Wayne Bartrim (1/2)		Tries: Gary Connolly (2); John Devereux (1); Steve McNamara (1); Steve Hampson (1); Goals: Deryck Fox (4/6)	Attendance: 9,753; Referee: David Manson

Gold Coast Seagulls	Great Britain

FB	1	Danny Peacock
RW	2	Clinton Mohr
CE	3	Terry Cook
CE	16	Adrian Vowles
LW	5	David Bouveng
FE	4	Mathew Donovan
HB	7	Ali Davys
PR	8	Ian Stains
HK	9	Ray Herring (c)
PR	10	Keith Neller
SR	11	Paul Galea
SR	12	Mike McLean
LK	13	Wayne Bartrim
Substitutions:
IC	14	Kevin Campion
IC	15	Robin Thorne
IC	17	Scott Sattler
IC	19	Jamie Goddard
Coach:
(Australia) Wally Lewis

FB	1	Steve Hampson
LW	2	Alan Hunte
CE	3	John Devereux
CE	4	Gary Connolly
RW	5	Graeme Hallas
SO	6	Kevin Ellis
SH	7	Deryck Fox (c)
PR	8	Lee Crooks
HK	9	Lee Jackson
PR	10	Karl Fairbank
SR	11	Steve McNamara
SR	12	Paul Hulme
LF	13	Mark Aston
Substitutions:
IC	14	David Myers
IC	15	Karl Harrison
IC	16	Michael Jackson
IC	17	Paul Broadbent
Coach:
(England) Mal Reilly

Former Australian test skipper, Gold Coast captain/coach Wally Lewis, was a late withdrawal for the Seagulls with a hamstring injury while Dale Shearer was also unavailable due to the same injury that saw him forced to withdraw from each of the Ashes tests after being selected in the centres for each game.

==== Third Test ====
The third and final test was allocated points for the 1989–1992 Rugby League World Cup.

By playing in this, his 37th test match, Australian captain Mal Meninga became his country's most-capped test player, breaking the record of former Australian captain Reg Gasnier who was on hand to congratulate Meninga on his achievement. Meninga's 14th Ashes test also broke Keith Holman's record for most Ashes tests against Great Britain (at his retirement on the 1994 Kangaroo Tour, Meninga would leave the record, still standing as of 2024, at 17 Ashes tests). His try and four goals also brought his total of points scored in Anglo-Australian test matches to 108, overtaking Neil Fox's record.

Friday, 3 July

Australia	16 – 10	Great Britain
Tries: Laurie Daley; Mal Meninga; Goals: Mal Meninga (4)		Tries: Martin Offiah Goals: Paul Eastwood (3)

Lang Park, Brisbane
Attendance: 32,313
Referee: Dennis Hale (New Zealand)
Player of the Match: Paul Sironen

Australia	Position	Great Britain
Andrew Ettingshausen	FB	Graham Steadman
Willie Carne	WG	Paul Eastwood
Mal Meninga (c)	CE	Daryl Powell
Brad Fittler	CE	Paul Newlove
Michael Hancock	WG	Martin Offiah
Laurie Daley	FE/SO	Garry Schofield (c)
Allan Langer	HB/SH	Shaun Edwards
Paul Harragon	PR	Kelvin Skerrett
Steve Walters	HK	Martin Dermott
Glenn Lazarus	PR	Andy Platt
Paul Sironen	SR	Denis Betts
Bob Lindner	SR	Billy McGinty
Bradley Clyde	LF	Phil Clarke
David Gillespie	Res.	Paul Hulme
Kevin Walters	Res.	Karl Harrison
Chris Johns	Res.	Gary Connolly
John Cartwright	Res.	Joe Lydon
Bob Fulton	Coach	Mal Reilly

The third test at Lang Park in Brisbane was played in warm, dry conditions in total contrast to the second test. Mal Meninga (4) and Paul Eastwood (2) traded goals for the only scores in the first half. Lions captain Garry Schofield had the best scoring opportunity of the first half when put into a gap only 10 metres out from the Australian line, but the pass from Paul Newlove was called forward by referee Dennis Hale. Late in the half a fight erupted with rival hookers Steve Walters (Aust) and Martin Dermott (GB) trading blows. Meninga then kicked a penalty goal to give the home side an 8-4 lead at half time.

Laurie Daley scored the first try of the game midway through the second half. Andrew Ettingshausen played the ball only 5 metres out from the Lions line and Brad Fittler, back in the side after missing the Melbourne test, ran infield from dummy half. He stepped back inside and popped a pass to Daley who juggled the ball, but managed to get through the tackle of Schofield and Shaun Edwards to get it down for a try amidst howls of protests from Phil Clarke who was claiming a knock on. Meninga missed the difficult conversion but the Aussies led 12-4. Then with 15 minutes remaining, Meninga put the Aussies further ahead with a try from a Laurie Daley kick. Meninga won the race to the ball despite a number of Lions converging before powering through the tackle of Edwards and Denis Betts to plant the ball down and give the Aussies a match winning 16-4 lead. Martin Offiah finally showed his speed to give the Lions some hope in the last 5 minutes, After Dermott hit Meninga in a side on tackle which caused the Australian captain to spill the ball, Offiah toed ahead a loose ball 30 metres out from his line before regathering and racing 50 metres to score under the posts with only Kevin Walters in pursuit. Eastwood converted to see the Lions trim the lead to 16-10, but that was as close as they got as the Australian's held out Great Britain to retain The Ashes that they had held since 1974.

Australian forward Brad Clyde was awarded with the Harry Sunderland Medal for the Player of the Series.

The Ashes series was televised in Australia by Seven Network with commentary provided by Graeme Hughes, Pat Welsh and former Australian captain Wally Lewis. For the first time, the entire tour was televised back into Britain through Sky Sports with commentary from Eddie Hemmings, former Great Britain World Cup winning hooker Mike Stephenson with an injured Jonathan Davies doing the sideline reporting. The series was also televised into New Zealand via TV3 with Australian David Morrow calling all three tests, joined in Sydney by former South Sydney and Balmain coach Bill Anderson, in Melbourne by New Zealand test captain Gary Freeman, and in Brisbane by former Australian lock forward Wayne Pearce.

== New Zealand ==
Wednesday, 8 July	Auckland	8 – 14	Great Britain	Carlaw Park, Auckland
	Tries: D. Macintosh; Goals: D. Macintosh (2)		Tries: Alan Hunte, Kevin Ellis; Goals: Deryck Fox (3)	Attendance: 5,000; Referee: Jim Stokes

This was Great Britain's first win over the Auckland representative side since 1979, Auckland had played five with three wins, one loss and one draw against both Great Britain and Australian touring sides since then.

=== First Test ===
Sunday, 12 July

New Zealand	15 – 14	Great Britain
Tries: Tony Kemp; Richie Blackmore; Goals: Matthew Ridge (2/3); Gavin Hill (1/1); Field goals: Daryl Halligan (1)		Tries: Shaun Edwards; Phil Clarke; Goals: Paul Eastwood (3/3)

Palmerston North Showgrounds, Palmerston North
Attendance: 11,548
Referee: Bill Harrigan (Australia)
Player of the Match: Gary Freeman

New Zealand	Great Britain

FB	1	Matthew Ridge
RW	2	Sean Hoppe
RC	3	Kevin Iro
LC	4	Tony Kemp
LW	5	Ritchie Blackmore
FE	6	Dean Clark
HB	7	Gary Freeman (c)
PR	8	Brent Stuart
HK	9	Duane Mann
PR	10	Brent Todd
SR	11	Gavin Hill
SR	12	Quentin Pongia
LF	13	Brendon Tuuta
Substitutions:
IC	14	Daryl Halligan
IC	15	Mike Kuiti
IC	16	Tea Ropati
IC	17	Mark Woods
Coach:
(New Zealand) Howie Tamati

FB	1	Graham Steadman
RW	2	Paul Eastwood
RC	3	Daryl Powell
LC	4	Gary Connolly
LW	5	Martin Offiah
SO	6	Garry Schofield (c)
SH	7	Shaun Edwards
PR	8	Kelvin Skerrett
HK	9	Lee Jackson
PR	10	Andy Platt
SR	11	Denis Betts
SR	12	Billy McGinty
LK	13	Phil Clarke
Substitutions:
IC	14	Joe Lydon
IC	15	Paul Hulme
IC	16	Karl Harrison
IC	17
Coach:
(England) Mal Reilly

Canterbury	6 – 17	Great Britain	Addington Showgrounds, Christchurch
Tries: Maea David; Goals: Mike Culley		Tries: Paul Newlove, Kevin Ellis, Alan Hunte; Goals: Deryck Fox (3); Field Goals: Joe Lydon (1)	Attendance: 4,000; Referee: Des O'Sullivan

=== Second Test ===
Great Britain's victory in Auckland ensured that they would face Australia in the World Cup Final in October later in the year.

Sunday, 19 July

New Zealand	16 – 19	Great Britain
Tries: Gary Freeman; Sean Hoppe; Brent Todd; Goals: Matthew Ridge (2)		Tries: Lee Jackson; Denis Betts; Martin Offiah; Goals: Paul Eastwood (3); Field Goals: Garry Schofield (1)

Carlaw Park, Auckland
Attendance: 10,233
Referee: Bill Harrigan (Australia)
Player of the Match: Garry Schofield

New Zealand	Great Britain

FB	1	Matthew Ridge
RW	2	Sean Hoppe
RC	3	Kevin Iro
LC	4	Tony Kemp
LW	5	Ritchie Blackmore
FE	6	Dean Clark
HB	7	Gary Freeman (c)
PR	8	Brent Stuart
HK	9	Duane Mann
PR	10	Brent Todd
SR	11	Gavin Hill
SR	12	Quentin Pongia
LF	13	Brendon Tuuta
Substitutions:
IC	14	Daryl Halligan
IC	15	Mike Kuiti
IC	16	Tea Ropati
IC	17	Mark Woods
Coach:
(New Zealand) Howie Tamati

FB	1	Graham Steadman
RW	2	Paul Eastwood
RC	3	Daryl Powell
LC	4	Gary Connolly
LW	5	Martin Offiah
SO	6	Garry Schofield (c)
SH	7	Shaun Edwards
PR	8	Karl Harrison
HK	9	Lee Jackson
PR	10	Andy Platt
SR	11	Denis Betts
SR	12	Billy McGinty
LK	13	Phil Clarke
Substitutions:
IC	14	Paul Newlove
IC	15	Michael Jackson
IC	16	John Devereux
IC	17	Karl Fairbank
Coach:
(England) Mal Reilly

== Statistics ==
Leading try scorer

- 7 by Martin Offiah

Leading point scorer

- 62 by Paul Eastwood (4 tries, 23 goals)

Largest attendance

- 40,141 – First test vs Australia at the Sydney Football Stadium

Largest non-test attendance

- 18,220 – Parramatta Eels vs Great Britain at Parramatta Stadium
