= 1991–92 Challenge Cup =

Rugby league competition

1992 Silk Cut Challenge Cup
- Duration: 6 Rounds
- Winners: Wigan
- Runners-up: Castleford
- Lance Todd Trophy: Martin Offiah

The 1992 Challenge Cup was the 91st staging of rugby league's oldest knockout competition, the Challenge Cup. Known as the Silk Cut Challenge Cup for sponsorship reasons, the final was contested by Wigan and Castleford at Wembley. Wigan won the match 28–12.

== Preliminary round ==
Date	Team One	Team Two	Score
08 Jan	Nottingham City (3)	Batley (3)	0-36
09 Jan	Chorley Borough (3)	Salford (1)	13-64
12 Jan	Kells A.R.L.F.C. (4)	Hull Dockers (4)	17-14
12 Jan	Wakefield Trinity (1)	Huddersfield (3)	32-18
13 Jan	Workington Town (2)	Carlisle (2)	11-4
21 Jan	Bramley (3)	Leeds (1)	12-36

== First round ==
Date	Team One	Team Two	Score
25 Jan	Dewsbury (3)	Leigh (2)	14-2
25 Jan	Leeds (1)	Ryedale-York (2)	48-6
26 Jan	Barrow (3)	Keighley (3)	7-7
26 Jan	Batley (3)	Featherstone Rovers (1)	20-36
26 Jan	Halifax (1)	Hull Kingston Rovers (1)	12-8
26 Jan	Trafford Borough (3)	Castleford (1)	0-50
26 Jan	Workington Town (2)	Wakefield Trinity (1)	13-8
28 Jan	Whitehaven (3)	Sheffield Eagles (2)	4-56
29 Jan	Kells A.R.L.F.C. (4)	Hunslet (3)	14-32
02 Feb	Doncaster (3)	Swinton (1)	14-4
02 Feb	Highfield (3)	London Crusaders (2)	12-12
02 Feb	Keighley (3)	Barrow (3)	14-14
02 Feb	Rochdale Hornets (2)	Hull FC (1)	28-32
02 Feb	Salford (1)	Wigan (1)	6-22
02 Feb	Scarborough Pirates (3)	Bradford Northern (1)	4-52
02 Feb	Widnes (1)	St Helens (1)	2-10
03 Feb	Oldham (2)	Warrington (1)	3-8
04 Feb	Barrow (3)	Keighley (3)	16-0
04 Feb	London Crusaders(2)	Highfield (3)	24-10

== Second round ==
Date	Team One	Team Two	Score
08 Feb	Leeds	St Helens	12-32
09 Feb	Workington Town	London Crusaders	9-2
09 Feb	Dewsbury	Featherstone Rovers	10-23
09 Feb	Halifax	Doncaster	66-8
09 Feb	Hunslet	Castleford	12-28
09 Feb	Sheffield Eagles	Hull F.C.	6-11
10 Feb	Barrow	Bradford Northern	13-30
16 Feb	Wigan	Warrington	14-0

== Quarter-finals ==
Date	Team One	Team Two	Score
22 Feb	St Helens	Wigan	6-13
23 Feb	Castleford	Featherstone Rovers	19-12
23 Feb	Halifax	Bradford Northern	4-12
23 Feb	Workington Town	Hull F.C.	8-24

== Semi finals ==
14 March 1992

Castleford	8 – 4	Hull
Try: Ford; Goal: Crooks (2)	Report	Try: Eastwood

Headingley, Leeds
Attendance: 14,636

28 March 1992

Wigan	71 – 10	Bradford Northern
Try: Betts, Lucas, Miles (2), Offiah (5), Lydon, Edwards, Bell, Botica; Goal: Botica (9); Drop goal: Gregory	Report	Try: Shelford, Gill; Goal: Hobbs

Burnden Park, Bolton
Attendance: 18,027

== Final ==
2 May 1992

Wigan	28 – 12	Castleford
Try: Offiah (2), Edwards, Hampson; Goal: Botica (5); Drop goal: Lydon (2)	Report	Try: Blackmore, England; Goal: Ketteridge (2)

Wembley, London
Attendance: 77,386
Referee: Robin Whitfield (Widnes)
Player of the Match: Martin Offiah

FB	1	Joe Lydon
RW	2	Frano Botica
RC	3	Dean Bell (c)
LC	4	Gene Miles
LW	5	Martin Offiah
SO	6	Shaun Edwards
SH	7	Andy Gregory
PR	8	Kelvin Skerrett
HK	9	Martin Dermott
PR	10	Andy Platt
SR	11	Denis Betts
SR	12	Billy McGinty
LF	13	Phil Clarke
Substitutions:
IC	14	Steve Hampson
IC	15	Neil Cowie
Coach:
John Monie

FB	1	Graham Steadman
RW	2	Jon Wray
RC	3	St John Ellis
LC	4	Richie Blackmore
LW	5	David Nelson
SO	6	Grant Anderson
SH	7	Mike Ford
PR	8	Lee Crooks (c)
HK	9	Graham Southernwood
PR	10	Keith England
SR	11	Graeme Bradley
SR	12	Martin Ketteridge
LF	13	Tawera Nikau
Substitutions:
IC	14	Tony Smith
IC	15	Dean Sampson
Coach:
Darryl van der Velde
