= 1988–89 League Cup =

The 1988–89 League Cup could refer to:

- 1988–89 John Player Special Trophy
- 1988–89 Football League Cup
