= 1989–90 League Cup =

1989-90 League Cup may refer to:

- 1989–90 Football League Cup, an association football tournament
- 1989–90 Regal Trophy, a rugby league tournament
