= Max Chapman =

Max Chapman may refer to:

- Max Chapman (rugby league), Australian rugby league footballer active in the 1990s
- Max Chapman (artist) (1911–1999), English painter and critic
- Max C. Chapman, American business executive
