= Andy Goodway =

Former English professional rugby league footballer and coach

Personal information
- Full name: Andrew Goodway
- Born: 2 June 1961 (age 64); Castleford, West Riding of Yorkshire, England

Playing information
- Position: Second-row
Club
Years	Team	Pld	T	G	FG	P
1980–85	Oldham	106	30	0	0	109
1985	Manly Sea Eagles	10	1	0	0	4
1985–91	Wigan	224	78	0	0	312
1992–93	Leeds	24	1	0	0	4
1993–94	Oldham	30	1	0	0	4
	Total	394	111	0	0	433
Representative
Years	Team	Pld	T	G	FG	P
1983–90	Great Britain	23	6	0	0	23
1984	England	1	0	0	0	0
1985–89	Yorkshire	4	3	0	0	12
1984	GB tour games	6	5	0	0	20

Coaching information
Club
Years	Team	Gms	W	D	L	W%
1994–97	Oldham	88	34	2	52	39
1997	Paris St-Germain	15	5	0	10	33
1999	Wigan Warriors	16	11	1	4	69
	Total	119	50	3	66	42
Representative
Years	Team	Gms	W	D	L	W%
1997–99	Great Britain	10	3	1	6	30
1998	England	1	1	0	0	100
- Source: As of 14 March 2021

Andrew Goodway (born 2 June 1961) is a former English professional rugby league footballer and coach. He played for Oldham (two spells), Wigan and Leeds in the Championship and Manly Warringah Sea Eagles in the NSWRL competition. He played as a prop, second-row or loose forward. He is a former Great Britain and England international.

== Playing career ==
=== Early career ===
Born in Castleford, Goodway began playing rugby league at local amateur club, Redhill. In 1979, he turned professional, signing for Oldham, making his first team debut for the club in April 1980.

=== Wigan ===
In July 1985, Goodway was signed by Wigan for a fee of around £60,000. He played second-row and scored a try in Wigan's 14–8 victory over New Zealand in the 1985 New Zealand rugby league tour of Great Britain and France match at Central Park, Wigan on Sunday 6 October 1985.

During the 1987–88 season, Goodway played at second-row for defending champions Wigan in their 1987 World Club Challenge victory against the visiting Manly-Warringah Sea Eagles.

Goodway played second-row in Wigan's 34–8 victory over Warrington in the 1985 Lancashire Cup Final during the 1985–86 season at Knowsley Road, St. Helens, on Sunday 13 October 1985, played loose forward in the 15-8 victory over Oldham in the 1986 Lancashire Cup Final during the 1986–87 season at Knowsley Road, St. Helens, on Sunday 19 October 1986, played second-row and was man of the match in the 28–16 victory over Warrington in the 1987 Lancashire Cup Final during the 1987–88 season at Knowsley Road, St. Helens, on Sunday 11 October 1987, and played second-row in Wigan's 22-17 victory over Salford in the 1988 Lancashire Cup Final during the 1988–89 season at Knowsley Road, St. Helens on Sunday 23 October 1988.

Goodway played second-row in Wigan's 11–8 victory over Hull Kingston Rovers in the 1985–86 John Player Special Trophy Final during the 1985–86 season at Elland Road, Leeds on Saturday 11 January 1986, played loose forward, scored a try, and was man of the match in the 18–4 victory over Warrington in the 1986–87 John Player Special Trophy Final during the 1986–87 season at Burnden Park, Bolton on Saturday 10 January 1987, appeared as a substitute (replacing prop Adrian Shelford on 20 minutes) in the 12–6 victory over Widnes in the 1988–89 John Player Special Trophy Final during the 1988–89 season at Burnden Park, Bolton on Saturday 7 January 1989, and appeared as a substitute (replacing second-row Ian Gildart on 21 minutes) in the 24–12 victory over Halifax in the 1989–90 Regal Trophy Final during the 1989–90 season at Headingley, Leeds on Saturday 13 January 1990.

In August 1991, Goodway suffered a broken arm in the Charity Shield against Hull. The injury was initially expected to keep him out of action for at least two months, but he did not play again for the entire 1991–92 season.

=== Later career ===
In 1992, Goodway joined Leeds for a fee of £25,000. He returned to Oldham a year later.

=== Representative honours ===
Goodway was capped 23 times by Great Britain between 1983 and 1990. He played in all seven Tests during the 1984 Lions tour, and was named team captain in 1985. He was also selected for the 1988 tour, but was forced to withdraw from the squad.

== Coaching career ==
He has coached Oldham, Paris Saint-Germain and Wigan Warriors and at international level with both Great Britain and England. In the 1997 post season, Goodway coached Great Britain to a 2-1 loss in the Super League Test series against Australia.

== Honours ==
Goodway is an Oldham Hall Of Fame Inductee. In 1985, he was named in the Open Rugby World XIII.
