= Dennis Hale (rugby league) =

New Zealand rugby league footballer and referee

Personal information
- Born: New Zealand

Refereeing information
Years	Competition	Apps
1990–1995	World Cup	5
1990–1995	Other Internationals	8
1992	World Club Challenge	1
- Source: RLP

Dennis Hale is a New Zealand former international rugby league referee.

== Early years ==
Hale began his involvement with rugby league as a player with the North Shore club. He would go on to be involved in coaching and administration with the club, before becoming a referee in 1976.

== Refereeing career ==
Hale made his senior referee debut in 1981, five years after taking up the whistle. Besides refereeing in the Auckland Rugby League and New Zealand Rugby League competitions, Hale also controlled PNG's Cambridge Cup final in 1990, several matches in the Championship and the 1992 World Club Challenge match.

Hale retired in 1997.

== International career ==
Hale made his international test debut in 1989 controlling a match between Papua New Guinea and Great Britain in Papua New Guinea. Great Britain felt hard done by Hale's refereeing in Papua New Guinea and in the 1992 Ashes series against Australia.

Hale would go on to referee eleven consecutive test matches. This would include six between October 1991 and October 1992 and five in the 1992 calendar year, both world records. Arguably the biggest game Hale refereed internationally was when he was chosen to referee the 1992 Rugby League World Cup final at London's famous Wembley Stadium between Great Britain and eventual winners Australia with the game played in front of a then international rugby league record attendance of 73,631. Previously he had been one of the touch judges in the 1988 Rugby League World Cup final won by Australia over New Zealand in front of a New Zealand record rugby league attendance of 47,363 at Eden Park in Auckland.

When he controlled the first test of the 1995 Trans-Tasman Test series at Lang Park in Brisbane, Australia between Australia and New Zealand, he became the first New Zealand referee to control an overseas test match involving New Zealand. His last international test was following the 1995 World Cup when he refereed the Final of the Emerging Nations Tournament between Ireland and the Cook Islands. Hale finished with thirteen test matches, the second most by a New Zealander after John Percival.

== Personal life ==
Hale, a Devonport businessman, is married to Dianne, who is a former Deputy Mayor of the North Shore City Council and currently sits on the Devonport - Takapuna Local Board.
