= 1988–89 John Player Special Trophy =

Rugby league season

- Structure: National knockout championship
- Teams: 18
- Winners: Wigan
- Runners-up: Widnes

The 1988–89 John Player Special Trophy was the eighteenth season for the competition (named as such due to sponsorship from John Player & Sons).

Wigan won the final, beating Widnes by the score of 12-6. The match was played at Burnden Park, Bolton, Greater Manchester. The attendance was 20,709 and receipts were £94874.

== Background ==
This season saw no changes in the entrants, no new members and no withdrawals, the number remaining at thirty-six
Huddersfield dropped the "Barracuda" suffix and the ground reverted to the traditional Fartown name, much to the relief of most of the fans - and - Springfield Borough moved to Chorley after only one season and re-branded themselves Chorley Borough, playing at Victory Park, the home of Chorley FC

== Competition and results ==
=== Preliminary round ===
Involved 4 matches and 8 Clubs

Game No	Fixture Date	Home team	Score	Away team	Venue	Att	Rec	Notes	Ref
1	Sun 30 Oct 1988	Featherstone Rovers	46-2	Hunslet	Post Office Road	1972			
2	Sun 30 Oct 1988	Wigan St Patricks	36-2	Elland (Halifax)	Central Park	2510		1, 2	
3	Sun 30 Oct 1988	Workington Town	2-28	Castleford	Derwent Park	1502			
4	Sun 6 Nov 1988	Bramley	56-10	Fulham	McLaren Field	850			

=== Round 1 - First Round ===
Involved 16 matches and 32 Clubs

Game No	Fixture Date	Home team	Score	Away team	Venue	Att	Rec	Notes	Ref
1	Sat 12 Nov 1988	Leeds	12-21	Castleford	Headingley	10006			
2	Sun 13 Nov 1988	Bradford Northern	34-18	Dewsbury	Odsal	2555			
3	Sun 13 Nov 1988	Bramley	32-6	Mansfield Marksman	McLaren Field	1151			
4	Sun 13 Nov 1988	Halifax	22-4	Salford	Thrum Hall	6661			
5	Sun 13 Nov 1988	Huddersfield	4-22	Chorley Borough	Fartown	1120			
6	Sun 13 Nov 1988	Hull F.C.	26-10	Batley	Boulevard	4054			
7	Sun 13 Nov 1988	Hull Kingston Rovers	40-0	Keighley	Craven Park (1)	3319			
8	Sun 13 Nov 1988	Leigh	42-14	Barrow	Hilton Park	3256			
9	Sun 13 Nov 1988	Rochdale Hornets	26-20	Whitehaven	Athletic Grounds	888			
10	Sun 13 Nov 1988	Runcorn Highfield	2-92	Wigan	Central Park	7233		3, 4, 5	
11	Sun 13 Nov 1988	Sheffield Eagles	80-8	Wigan St Patricks	Owlerton Stadium	621			
12	Sun 13 Nov 1988	Swinton	13-16	Doncaster	Station Road	2182			
13	Sun 13 Nov 1988	Wakefield Trinity	34-14	Carlisle	Belle Vue	2513			
14	Sun 13 Nov 1988	Warrington	21-14	Oldham	Wilderspool	5528			
15	Sun 13 Nov 1988	Widnes	37-12	Featherstone Rovers	Naughton Park	5299		6	
16	Sun 13 Nov 1988	York	6-14	St. Helens	Clarence Street	3082			

=== Round 2 - Second Round ===
Involved 8 matches and 16 Clubs

Game No	Fixture Date	Home team	Score	Away team	Venue	Att	Rec	Notes	Ref
1	Sat 26 Nov 1988	Wigan	20-16	Halifax	Central Park	10826			
2	Sun 27 Nov 1988	Castleford	18-19	Bradford Northern	Wheldon Road	7688			
3	Sun 27 Nov 1988	Chorley Borough	22-36	Hull Kingston Rovers	Victory Park	983			
4	Sun 27 Nov 1988	Leigh	40-8	Doncaster	Hilton Park	4321			
5	Sun 27 Nov 1988	St. Helens	16-13	Hull F.C.	Knowsley Road	7485			
6	Sun 27 Nov 1988	Sheffield Eagles	9-32	Widnes	Owlerton Stadium	2716			
7	Sun 27 Nov 1988	Wakefield Trinity	38-12	Rochdale Hornets	Belle Vue	2486			
8	Sun 27 Nov 1988	Warrington	42-10	Bramley	Wilderspool	3274			

=== Round 3 -Quarter Finals ===
Involved 4 matches with 8 clubs

Game No	Fixture Date	Home team	Score	Away team	Venue	Att	Rec	Notes	Ref
1	Sat 3 Dec 1988	Widnes	16-7	Warrington	Naughton Park	6449			
2	Sun 4 Dec 1988	Bradford Northern	6-0	Leigh	Odsal	3975			
3	Sun 4 Dec 1988	Hull Kingston Rovers	16-16	Wigan	Craven Park (1)	7142			
4	Sun 4 Dec 1988	St. Helens	34-18	Wakefield Trinity	Knowsley Road	7602			

=== Round 3 -Quarter Finals - Replays ===
Involved 1 match with 2 clubs

Game No	Fixture Date	Home team	Score	Away team	Venue	Att	Rec	Notes	Ref
1	Wed 7 Dec 1988	Wigan	30-0	Hull Kingston Rovers	Central Park	13278			

=== Round 4 – Semi-Finals ===
Involved 2 matches and 4 Clubs

Game No	Fixture Date	Home team	Score	Away team	Venue	Att	Rec	Notes	Ref
1	Sat 10 Dec 1988	Widnes	20-18	St. Helens	Wigan ??	6755			
2	Sat 17 Dec 1988	Wigan	16-5	Bradford Northern	Leeds ??	6809			

=== Final ===
Game No	Fixture Date	Home team	Score	Away team	Venue	Att	Rec	Notes	Ref
	Saturday 7 January 1989	Wigan	12-6	Widnes	Burnden Park	20709	94874	7	

==== Teams and scorers ====
Wigan	№	Widnes
	teams	
Steve Hampson	1	Alan Tait
Dean Bell	2	Rick Thackray
Kevin Iro	3	Andy Currier
Joe Lydon	4	Darren Wright
Tony Iro	5	Martin "Chariots" Offiah
Ged Byrne	6	Tony Myler
Shaun Edwards	7	David Hulme
Adrian Shelford	8	Kurt Sorensen
Martin Dermott	9	Phil McKenzie
Shaun Wane	10	Joe Grima
Denis Betts	11	Mike O'Neill
Ian Potter	12	Emosi Koloto
Ellery Hanley	13	"Richie" Eyres
Andy Gregory (for Joe Lydon 51 min)	14	?? Not used
Andy Goodway (for Adrian Shelford 20 min)	15	Paul Hulme (for Emosi Koloto 44 min)
Graham Lowe	Coach	Doug Laughton
12	score	6
6	HT	6
	Scorers	
	Tries	
Kevin Iro (1)	T	Darren Wright (1)
Ellery Hanley (1)	T	
	Goals	
Joe Lydon (2)	G	Andy Currier (1)
Referee		John Holdsworth (Kippax)
Man of the match		Ellery Hanley - Wigan - loose forward
Competition Sponsor		John Player Special

Scoring - Try = four points - Goal = two points - Drop goal = one point

==== Timeline in the final ====
Time	Incident	Score
incidents	incidents	score
6th Minute	Try: Kevin Iro	4-0
13th Minute	Try: Darren Wright	4-4
	Conversion: Andy Currier	4-6
21st Minute	Penalty Goal: Joe Lydon	6-6
Half Time		6-6
42nd Minute	Penalty Goal: Joe Lydon	8-6
69th Minute	Try: Ellery Hanley	12-6
Full Time		12-6

=== Prize money ===
As part of the sponsorship deal and funds, the prize money awarded to the competing teams for this season is as follows :-

Finish Position	Cash prize	No. receiving prize	Total cash
Winner	?	1	?
Runner-up	?	1	?
semi-finalist	?	2	?
loser in Rd 3	?	4	?
loser in Rd 2	?	8	?
Loser in Rd 1	?	16	?
Loser in Prelim Round	?	?	?
Grand Total			

Note - the author is unable to trace the award amounts for this season. Can anyone help ?

=== The road to success ===
This tree excludes any preliminary round fixtures

First round
Huddersfield	4
Chorley Borough	22
Hull Kingston Rovers	40
Keighley	0
Runcorn Highfield	2
Wigan	92
Halifax	22
Salford	4
Leeds	12
Castleford	21
Bradford Northern	34
Dewsbury	18
Leigh	42
Barrow	14
Swinton	13
Doncaster	16
Sheffield Eagles	80
Wigan St Patricks	8
Widnes	37
Featherstone Rovers	12
Warrington	21
Oldham	14
Bramley	32
Mansfield Marksman	6
York	6
St. Helens	14
Hull F.C.	26
Batley	10
Wakefield Trinity	34
Carlisle	14
Rochdale Hornets	26
Whitehaven	20

Second round
Chorley Borough	22
Hull Kingston Rovers	36
Wigan	20
Halifax	16
Castleford	18
Bradford Northern	19
Leigh	40
Doncaster	18
Sheffield Eagles	9
Widnes	34
Warrington	42
Bramley	10
St. Helens	16
Hull F.C.	13
Wakefield Trinity	38
Rochdale Hornets	12

Third round
Hull Kingston Rovers	16(0)
Wigan	16 (30)
Bradford Northern	6
Leigh	0
Widnes	16
Warrington	7
St. Helens	34
Wakefield Trinity	18

Semifinals
Wigan	16
Bradford Northern	5
Widnes	20
St. Helens	15

Final
Wigan	12
Widnes	6

== Notes and comments ==
1 * Wigan St Patricks are a Junior (amateur) club from Wigan
2 * Elland are a Junior (amateur) club from the Halifax area of Yorkshire
3 * Runcorn Highfield forfeited home advantage for a larger gate. Runcorn Players were also in dispute and the club fielded a very reduced strength team comprised a number of trialists and reserves (and coach Bill Ashurst, (an ex Wigan player) who came out of retirement especially to play, and was disappointedly sent off 12 minutes after coming off the subs bench)
4 * A Wigan record victory in this tournament
5 * The highest score, highest score by home team and highest winning margin in the competition, between all clubs to date
6 * RUGBYLEAGUEproject and Widnes official archives give the score as 37-12 but Wigan official archives gives it as 37-2
7 * Burnden Park was the home of English football club Bolton Wanderers from 1895 to 1997. It hosted the 1900-01 FA Cup Final replay in which Tottenham Hotspur beat Sheffield United 3.1. The record attendance was for a 6th round F A Cup match with Stoke City (Stanley Matthews played for Stoke at the time) at which, although the ground capacity was set at 70,000, an estimated 85,000 fans crowded in, and when two crush barriers broke, the result was 33 fans killed and another 400 injured. The capacity at closure was a mere 25,000

== See also ==
- 1988–89 Rugby Football League season
- 1988 Lancashire Cup
- 1988 Yorkshire Cup
- John Player Special Trophy
- Rugby league county cups
