= Billy McGinty (rugby league) =

Scottish RL coach & former GB international rugby league footballer

Personal information
- Born: 6 December 1964 (age 61) Glasgow, Scotland

Playing information
- Position: Second-row
Club
Years	Team	Pld	T	G	FG	P
1982–91	Warrington	135	20	0	0	80
1991–94	Wigan	75	9	0	0	36
1994–96	Workington Town	39	6	0	0	24
	Total	249	35	0	0	140
Representative
Years	Team	Pld	T	G	FG	P
1992	Great Britain	4	0	0	0	0
1987–89	Lancashire	2	0	0	0	0

Coaching information
Club
Years	Team	Gms	W	D	L	W%
2003	Workington Town	18	4	1	13	22
Representative
Years	Team	Gms	W	D	L	W%
1998	Scotland	2	0	0	2	0
2001–03	Scotland	3	2	0	1	67

Billy McGinty (born 6 December 1964) is a Scottish rugby union coach and former professional rugby league footballer who played in the 1980s and 1990s. He played in the forwards for Wigan during the period in the 1990s when they dominated the sport, and later for Workington Town.

== Background ==
Born in Glasgow, Scotland, McGinty grew up in North West England, and attended Wade Deacon High School in Widnes. He played both codes of rugby when growing up, playing rugby union at school, and rugby league for local amateur club, Widnes Tigers.

== Playing career ==
=== Warrington ===
McGinty was signed by Warrington in 1982. He appeared as a substitute in the club's 38–10 win against Halifax in the 1985–86 Premiership final at Elland Road, Leeds.

McGinty was also a substitute in Warrington's 14–36 defeat by Wigan in the 1989–90 Challenge Cup Final during the 1989–90 season at Wembley Stadium, London on Saturday 28 April 1990, in front of a crowd of 77,729.

Billy McGinty played right-second-row and was man of the match in Warrington's 12–2 victory over Bradford Northern in the 1990–91 Regal Trophy Final during the 1990–91 season at Headingley, Leeds on Saturday 12 January 1991.

=== Wigan ===
In August 1991, McGinty was signed by Wigan for a fee of £60,000.

During the 1991–92 Rugby Football League season, McGinty played for defending champions Wigan as a second-row in their 1991 World Club Challenge victory against the visiting Penrith Panthers. He was selected to go on the 1992 Great Britain Lions tour of Australia and New Zealand. He played as a second-row in Great Britain's victory over Australia in Melbourne.

During the 1992–93 Rugby Football League season McGinty played as a second-row for defending RFL champions Wigan in the 1992 World Club Challenge against the visiting Brisbane Broncos.

McGinty played right-second-row in Wigan's 5–4 victory over St. Helens in the 1992–93 Lancashire Cup Final during the 1992–93 season at Knowsley Road, St. Helens on Sunday 18 October 1992.

McGinty played right-second-row in Wigan's 15–8 victory over Bradford Northern in the 1992–93 Regal Trophy Final during the 1992–93 season at Elland Road, Leeds on Saturday 23 January 1993.

After the 1993–94 Rugby Football League season McGinty travelled with defending champions Wigan to Brisbane for the 1994 World Club Challenge. Due to injuries to Andy Platt and Kelvin Skerrett, he played as a prop in the 20–14 victory against Brisbane Broncos. The match was his last for Wigan, as he had already agreed to join Workington Town for a fee of £15,000.

== Coaching career ==
=== Rugby league ===
In 1998, McGinty was in charge of Scotland before being replaced by Shaun McRae a year later. He became head coach again after McRae stepped down in 2001.

In May 2003, he was appointed as head coach at Workington Town. A few months later, he joined Huddersfield Giants as an assistant coach to Jon Sharp, but resigned a few months later to spend more time with his family.

=== Rugby union ===
In 2004, McGinty joined the coaching staff at Worcester Warriors. In 2009, he was appointed as the club's backs and defence coach.

In 2011 McGinty was appointed defence coach of Edinburgh Rugby under head coach Michael Bradley.

In 2017, he was appointed by Tewkesbury as their new head coach.

== School coaching ==
In 2013, McGinty joined Royal Grammar School Worcester's rugby coaching set-up.
