= 1992–93 Lancashire Cup =

1992 Lancashire Cup
- Structure: Regional knockout championship
- Teams: 16
- Winners: Wigan
- Runners-up: St Helens

The 1992–93 Lancashire Cup was the 80th and last occasion on which the Lancashire Cup competition was held. Wigan won the trophy by beating St Helens by the score of 5-4 in the final.

== Background ==
The failure of London Crusaders to enter, due primarily to financial pressures, resulted in the number of entrants this year decreasing by one to 16.
This resulted in a full fixture list, with no requirement for a preliminary round, nor any “blank” or “dummy” fixtures or any byes.

== Competition and results ==
=== First round ===
Involved eight matches and 16 clubs.

Game No	Fixture Date	Home team	Score	Away team	Venue	Att	Ref
1	Fri 11 Sep 1992	Rochdale Hornets	8–36	Wigan	Spotland	2,936	
2	Sun 13 Sep 1992	Barrow	2–36	St Helens	Craven Park	2,317	
3	Sun 13 Sep 1992	Blackpool Gladiators	8–22	Workington Town	Jepson Way, Blackpool	736	
4	Sun 13 Sep 1992	Leigh	50–9	Chorley Borough	Hilton Park	1,332	
5	Sun 13 Sep 1992	Oldham	33–20	Warrington	Watersheddings	4,041	
6	Sun 13 Sep 1992	Salford	60–8	Whitehaven	The Willows	1,985	
7	Sun 13 Sep 1992	Swinton	40–10	Highfield	Station Road	616	
8	Sun 13 Sep 1992	Widnes	52–8	Carlisle	Naughton Park	3,733	

=== Second round ===
Involved four matches and eight clubs. In Wigan's match against Swinton, Shaun Edwards scored ten tries, equalling the club record for most tries in a match set by Martin Offiah a few months earlier.

Game No	Fixture Date	Home team	Score	Away team	Venue	Att	Ref
1	Wed 23 Sep 1992	Leigh	14–26	Oldham	Hilton Park	3,395	
2	Wed 23 Sep 1992	Salford	42–20	Workington Town	The Willows	2,143	
3	Tue 29 Sep 1992	Swinton	0–78	Wigan	Gigg Lane	3,501	
4	Wed 30 Sep 1992	St. Helens	10–8	Widnes	Knowsley Road	12,573	

=== Semi-finals ===
Involved two matches and four clubs.

Game No	Fixture Date	Home team	Score	Away team	Venue	Att	Ref
1	Tue 06 Oct 1992	Wigan	48–8	Oldham	Central Park	8,954	
2	Wed 07 Oct 1992	St Helens	18–5	Salford	Knowsley Road	9,289	

=== Final ===
St Helens won a coin toss for the home advantage, and the match was played at Knowsley Road, St Helens, with an attendance of 20,534.

18 October 1992

St Helens	4 – 5	Wigan
Goals: Dwyer (2)		Goals: Botica (2); Drop goals: Botica

Knowsley Road, St Helens
Attendance: 20,534
Referee: Stuart Cummings (Widnes)

==== Teams ====
Wigan	№	St. Helens
Steve Hampson	1	Phil Veivers
Jason Robinson	2	Alan Hunte
Joe Lydon	3	Gary Connolly
Andrew Farrar	4	Jarrod McCracken
Martin Offiah	5	Anthony Sullivan
Frano Botica	6	Tea Ropati
Shaun Edwards	7	Jonathan Griffiths
Kelvin Skerrett	8	John Harrison
Martin Dermott	9	Bernard Dwyer
Andy Platt	10	Kevin Ward
Denis Betts	11	Chris Joynt
Billy McGinty	12	Sonny Nickle
Dean Bell	13	Shane Cooper
	Subs	
Neil Cowie (for Steve Hampson 24 min)	14	Gus O'Donnell (for Phil Veivers 50 min)
Martin Crompton (for Martin Offiah Half Time)	15	Paul Forber (for John Harrison 65 min)
John Monie	Coach	Mike McClennan

=== The road to success ===
First round
Swinton	40
Highfield	10
Rochdale Hornets	8
Wigan	36
Leigh	50
Chorley Borough (2)	9
Oldham	33
Warrington	20
Barrow	2
St. Helens	36
Widnes	52
Carlisle	8
Salford	60
Whitehaven	8
Blackpool Gladiators	8
Workington Town	22

Second round
Swinton	0
Wigan	78
Leigh	14
Oldham	26
St. Helens	10
Widnes	8
Salford	42
Workington Town	20

Semi-finals
Wigan	48
Oldham	8
St. Helens	18
Salford	5

Final
Wigan	5
St. Helens	4

== See also ==
- 1992–93 Rugby Football League season
- Rugby league county cups
