= Kevin Ellis (rugby) =

Wales international rugby league & union footballer

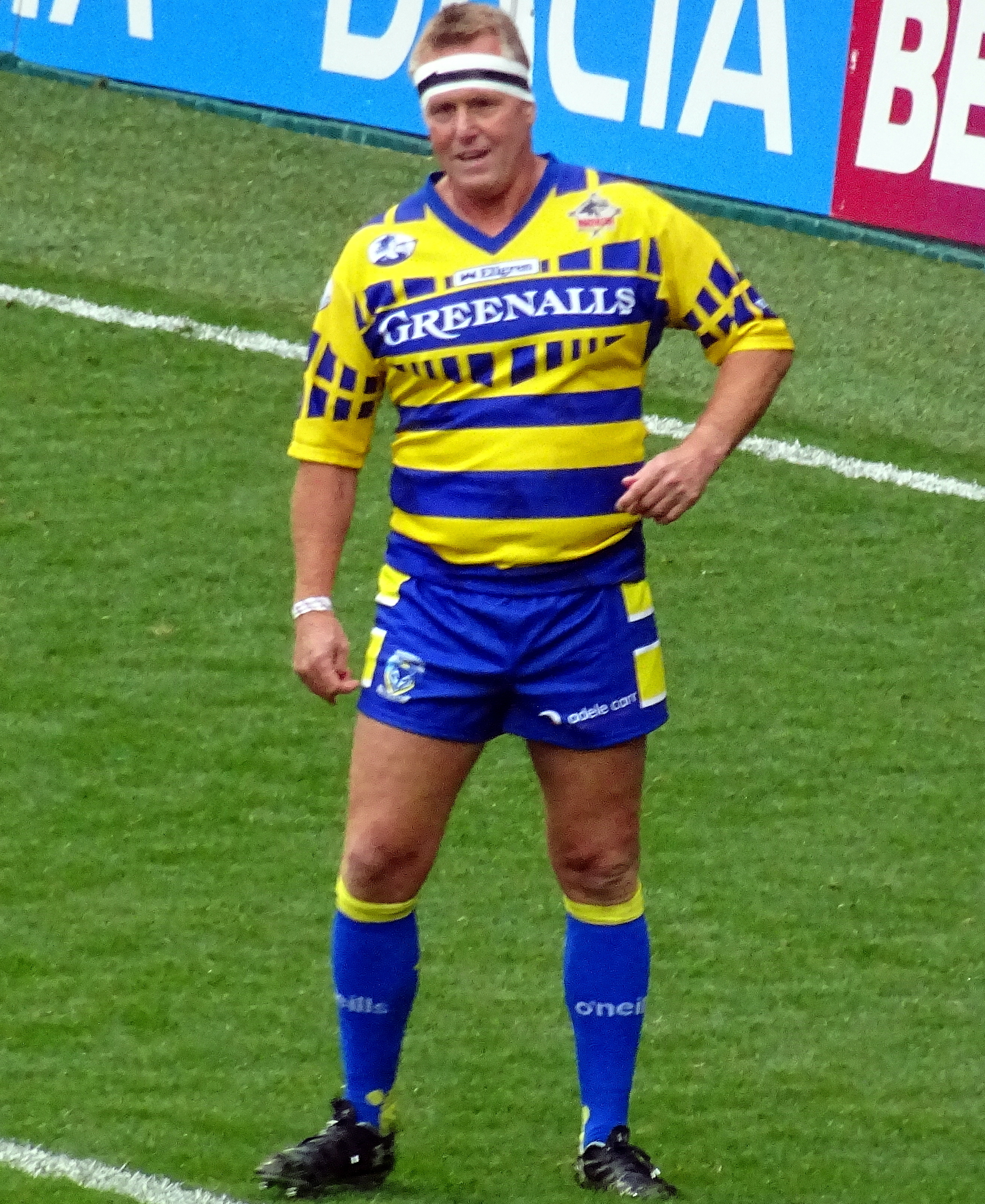

Personal information
- Full name: Kevin Stewart Ellis
- Born: 29 May 1965 (age 61) Bridgend, Wales

Playing information
- Height: 5 ft 9 in (1.75 m)
- Weight: 13 st 7 lb (86 kg)

Rugby league
- Position: Stand-off, Scrum-half, Loose forward
Club
Years	Team	Pld	T	G	FG	P
1990–94	Warrington Wolves	123	35	0	3	143
1994–95	Workington Town	21	10	0	1	41
1996	Gold Coast Chargers	3	1	0	0	4
2006	Celtic Crusaders	3	1	0	0	4
	Total	150	47	0	4	192
Representative
Years	Team	Pld	T	G	FG	P
1991	Great Britain	1	0	0	0	0
1991–95	Wales	15	5	0	1	21

Rugby union
- Position: Scrum-half / Fly-half
Club
Years	Team	Pld	T	G	FG	P
198?–89	Bridgend RFC
1995–96	Maesteg RFC
1996–97	Treorchy RFC
1997–??	Sale Sharks
	London Irish
1999–2001	Cardiff RFC	16	1			4
2002–03	Pontypool RFC
2001–02	Ebbw Vale RFC
200?–06	Maesteg RFC
	Total	16	1	0	0	4

Kevin Stewart Ellis (born 29 May 1965) is a Welsh former professional rugby league and rugby union footballer who played in the 1980s, 1990s and 2000s. A Great Britain and Wales national representative. He played club level rugby union (RU) for Bridgend RFC, Maesteg RFC (two spells), Treorchy RFC, Sale Sharks, London Irish, Cardiff RFC, Pontypool RFC and Ebbw Vale RFC, at representative level rugby league (RL) for Wales, and at club level for Warrington Wolves, Workington Town, Gold Coast Chargers, Bridgend Blue Bulls and Celtic Crusaders, as a stand-off, scrum-half, or loose forward.

== Playing career ==
Ellis switched from rugby union to rugby league in 1990, signing a five-year contract with Warrington. He played scrum-half in Warrington's 12–2 victory over Bradford Northern in the 1990–91 Regal Trophy Final during the 1990–91 season at Headingley, Leeds on Saturday 12 January 1991.

Ellis won caps for Wales (RL) while at Warrington in 1991 against Papua New Guinea, in 1992 against France, England, and France, in 1993 against New Zealand, in 1994 against France, and Australia, in 1995 against England, and France, in the 1995 Rugby League World Cup against France, Western Samoa, and England. He also won a cap for Great Britain while at Warrington in 1991 against France. He was selected to go on the 1992 Great Britain Lions tour of Australia and New Zealand.

Ellis switched back to playing rugby union in 1995, but briefly returned to rugby league in 2003 to play for Bridgend Blue Bulls in the 2003 Rugby League Conference Grand Final. He also made further appearances for Wales in 2003 against Russia, and Australia, and in 2004 against Ireland.

Ellis also worked as an assistant coach with Celtic Crusaders for several years, where he also made a handful of appearances as a player.

In May 2010 he announced that he would be returning to rugby at the age of 45 for the club that he was coach for, Maesteg RFC in the SWALEC Final.

== Outside rugby ==
Ellis also became a patron of Healing the Wounds, a British charity launched in December 2009 to help provide support and care for British servicemen and women suffering from Post Traumatic Stress Disorder.
