= Graeme Hallas =

English rugby coach and player (born 1971)

Personal information
- Born: 27 February 1971 (age 55) Leeds, England

Playing information
- Position: Wing, Centre, Loose forward
Club
Years	Team	Pld	T	G	FG	P
1988–92	Hull Kingston Rovers	67	15	34	4	132
1992–96	Halifax	78	30	2	0	124
1997–99	Hull FC	60	14	54	1	165
2000	Hunslet Hawks	7	0	0	0	0
2000–01	Keighley Cougars	35	12	5	0	58
2001–02	Huddersfield Giants	29	13	4	0	60
2003	York City Knights	22	9	29	0	94
	Total	298	93	128	5	633
Representative
Years	Team	Pld	T	G	FG	P
1991–92	Great Britain U21	3	0	0	0	0

Coaching information
Club
Years	Team	Gms	W	D	L	W%
2008–09	Hunslet Hawks
- Relatives: Sam Hallas (nephew)

Graeme Hallas (born 27 February 1971) is an English former professional rugby league footballer who played in the 1980s, 1990s and 2000s, and coached in the 2000s. He played at representative level for Great Britain in non-Test matches, and at club level for Hull Kingston Rovers, Halifax, Hull FC, the Huddersfield Giants and the York City Knights as a wing, centre, or loose forward, and coached at club level for Hunslet Hawks.

== Background ==
Graeme Hallas was born in Leeds, West Riding of Yorkshire, England.

== Playing career ==
=== Club career ===
Hallas began his amateur career with Dudley Hill ARLFC. He played for Hull Kingston Rovers, and was signed by Halifax in October 1992 in exchange for Rob Hutchinson and a fee of £70,000. He also played in the Super League for Hull F.C. and the Huddersfield Giants.

Despite Huddersfield Giants being relegated from the Super League in 2001, Hallas opted to stay with the club and signed a new contract. In 2002, Hallas played in Huddersfield Giants' victory over Leigh Centurions in the Northern Ford Premiership Grand Final. He left the club at the end of the season and joined the newly formed York City Knights. He appeared 22 times for the club in the 2003 season, scoring nine tries.

=== International honours ===
Hallas was selected for the 1992 Great Britain Lions tour of Australia and New Zealand.

== Coaching career ==
Hallas was appointed as head coach at Hunslet Hawks. He resigned in July 2009.
