= 1990–91 Regal Trophy =

- Structure: National knockout championship
- Teams: 38
- Winners: Warrington
- Runners-up: Bradford Northern

The 1990–91 Regal Trophy was a British rugby league knockout tournament. It was the 20th season that the competition was held, and was the second staging of the competition since it was re-named the Regal Trophy.

The final was won by Warrington, who beat Bradford Northern 12-2 in the match played at Headingley, Leeds. The attendance was 11,154 and receipts were £57662.

== Background ==
This season saw no changes in the entrants, no new members and no withdrawals, the number remaining at thirty-eight.

The preliminary round involved twelve clubs, to reduce the numbers to entrants to the first round proper to thirty-two.

== Competition and results ==
=== Preliminary round ===
Involved 2 matches and 4 clubs

Game No	Fixture Date	Home team	Score	Away team	Venue	Att	Rec	Notes	Ref
1	Wed 14 Nov 1990	Doncaster	14-12	Ryedale-York	Bentley Road Stadium/Tattersfield	1165			
2	Sat 17 Nov 1990	Bradford Dudley Hill	18-24	Dewsbury	Neil Hunt Ground, Bradford	970		1	
3	Sat 17 Nov 1990	Saddleworth	35-18	Egremont (Cumbria)	Watersheddings	900		2,3	
4	Sun 18 Nov 1990	Carlisle	10-28	Wakefield Trinity	Gifford Park	1479			
5	Sun 18 Nov 1990	Leeds	58-6	Halifax	Headingley	9761			
6	Sun 18 Nov 1990	Sheffield Eagles	8-12	Bradford Northern	Don Valley Stadium	2788			

=== Round 1 - First Round ===
Involved 16 matches and 32 clubs

Game No	Fixture Date	Home team	Score	Away team	Venue	Att	Rec	Notes	Ref
1	Fri 30 Nov 1990	Rochdale Hornets	30-10	Saddleworth (Oldham)	Spotland	2434		2	
2	Sat 1 Dec 1990	Widnes	24-16	Hull F.C.	Naughton Park	4940			
3	Sun 2 Dec 1990	Barrow	16-54	Featherstone Rovers	Craven Park	1200			
4	Sun 2 Dec 1990	Bradford Northern	12-11	Workington Town	Odsal	2850			
5	Sun 2 Dec 1990	Bramley	30-16	Dewsbury	McLaren Field	680			
6	Sun 2 Dec 1990	Fulham	8-14	Castleford	Chiswick Poly *	831		4	
7	Sun 2 Dec 1990	Huddersfield	13-15	Keighley	Fartown	1256			
8	Sun 2 Dec 1990	Leeds	26-22	Hull Kingston Rovers	Headingley	9753			
9	Sun 2 Dec 1990	Leigh	66-5	Chorley Borough (2)	Hilton Park	1313			
10	Sun 2 Dec 1990	Nottingham City	6-35	Batley	Harvey Hadden Stadium	367		5	
11	Sun 2 Dec 1990	Oldham	26-6	Salford	Watersheddings	4932			
12	Sun 2 Dec 1990	Swinton	7-31	St. Helens	Station Road	3385			
13	Sun 2 Dec 1990	Trafford Borough	10-10	Doncaster	Moss Lane Altrincham	409			
14	Sun 2 Dec 1990	Wakefield Trinity	40-8	Hunslet	Belle Vue	3531			
15	Sun 2 Dec 1990	Warrington	33-7	Runcorn Highfield	Wilderspool	2712			
16	Sun 2 Dec 1990	Whitehaven	6-24	Wigan	Recreation Ground	3459			

=== Round 1 - First Round replays ===
Involved xx matches and xx Clubs

Game No	Fixture Date	Home team	Score	Away team	Venue	Att	Rec	Notes	Ref
1	Thu 5 Dec 1990	Doncaster	19-7	Trafford Borough	Bentley Road Stadium/Tattersfield	1195			

=== Round 2 - Second Round ===
Involved 8 matches and 16 clubs

Game No	Fixture Date	Home team	Score	Away team	Venue	Att	Rec	Notes	Ref
1	Sat 8 Dec 1990	Widnes	22-6	Leeds	Naughton Park	3465			
2	Sun 9 Dec 1990	Batley	20-16	Oldham	Mount Pleasant	2054			
3	Sun 9 Dec 1990	Wakefield Trinity	4-20	Castleford	Belle Vue	7031			
4	Sun 9 Dec 1990	Warrington	11-6	Leigh	Wilderspool	3588			
5	Sun 9 Dec 1990	Wigan	36-16	Keighley	Central Park	5955			
6	Tue 11 Dec 1990	Bradford Northern	28-0	Bramley	Odsal	1815			
7	Tue 11 Dec 1990	Featherstone Rovers	16-33	St. Helens	Post Office Road	3343			
8	Wed 12 Dec 1990	Doncaster	10-14	Rochdale Hornets	Bentley Road Stadium/Tattersfield	1341			

=== Round 3 -Quarter-finals ===
Involved 4 matches with 8 clubs

Game No	Fixture Date	Home team	Score	Away team	Venue	Att	Rec	Notes	Ref
1	Sat 15 Dec 1990	Wigan	6-12	Bradford Northern	Central Park	5285			
2	Sun 16 Dec 1990	Castleford	14-19	Rochdale Hornets	Wheldon Road	4017			
3	Sun 16 Dec 1990	Warrington	18-12	St. Helens	Wilderspool	7390			
4	Sun 16 Dec 1990	Widnes	56-6	Batley	Naughton Park	6656			

=== Round 4 – Semi-finals ===
Involved 2 matches and 4 clubs

Game No	Fixture Date	Home team	Score	Away team	Venue	Att	Rec	Notes	Ref
1	Sat 22 Dec 1990	Bradford Northern	13-2	Rochdale Hornets	Headingley	3788			
2	Sat 29 Dec 1990	Warrington	8-4	Widnes	Central Park	7874			

=== Final ===
Game No	Fixture Date	Home team	Score	Away team	Venue	Att	Rec	Notes	Ref
	Saturday 12 January 1991	Warrington	12-2	Bradford Northern	Headingley	11154	57662	6	

==== Teams and scorers ====
Warrington	№	Bradford Northern
	teams	
David Lyon	1	Ian Wilkinson
Des Drummond (c)	2	Gerald Cordle
Allan Bateman	3	Darrall Shelford
Tony Thorniley	4	Roger Simpson
Mark Forster	5	Tony Marchant
Chris O'Sullivan	6	Neil Summers
Kevin Ellis	7	Brett Iti
Neil Harmon	8	David Hobbs
Duane Mann	9	Brian Noble
Gary Chambers	10	John Hamer
Gary Mercer	11	Paul Medley
Billy McGinty	12	David Croft
Paul Cullen	13	John Pendlebury (c)
Mark Thomas (for Gary Chambers 41 mins)	14	Phil Hellewell (for Tony Marchant 41 mins)
Rowland Phillips (for Neil Harmon 79 min)	15	Craig Richards (not used)
Brian Johnson	Coach	David Hobbs
12	score	2
4	HT	2
	Scorers	
	Tries	
Mark Thomas (1)	T	
	Goals	
David Lyon (4)	G	David Hobbs (1)
Referee		Jim Smith (Halifax)
Man of the match		Billy McGinty - Warrington - Second-row
Competition Sponsor		Regal

Scoring - Try = four points - Goal = two points - Drop goal = one point

=== Prize money ===
As part of the sponsorship deal and funds, the prize money awarded to the competing teams for this season is as follows :-

Finish Position	Cash prize	No. receiving prize	Total cash
Winner	30000	1	30000
Runner-up	16000	1	16000
semi-finalist	8500	2	17000
loser in Rd 3	5000	4	20000
loser in Rd 2	3250	8	26000
Loser in Rd 1	2000	16	32000
Loser in Prelim Round	2000	12	24000
Grand Total			165000
plus to capital development fund			110000
Grand Total			275000

=== The road to success ===
This tree excludes any preliminary round fixtures

First round
Warrington	33
Runcorn Highfield	7
Leigh	66
Chorley Borough (2)	5
Barrow	16
Featherstone Rovers	64
Swinton	7
St. Helens	31
Widnes	24
Hull F.C.	6
Leeds	26
Hull Kingston Rovers	22
Nottingham City	6
Batley	35
Oldham	26
Salford	6
Whitehaven	6
Wigan	24
Huddersfield	13
Keighley	15
Bradford Northern	12
Workington Town	11
Bramley	30
Dewsbury	16
Wakefield Trinity	40
Hunslet	8
Fulham	8
Castleford	14
Trafford Borough	10 (7)
Doncaster	10 (19)
Rochdale Hornets	30
Saddleworth (Oldham)	10

Second round
Warrington	11
Leigh	6
Featherstone Rovers	16
St. Helens	33
Widnes	22
Leeds	6
Batley	20
Oldham	16
Wigan	36
Keighley	16
Bradford Northern	28
Bramley	0
Wakefield Trinity	4
Castleford	12
Doncaster	10
Rochdale Hornets	14

Third round
Warrington	18
St. Helens	12
Widnes	56
Batley	6
Wigan	6
Bradford Northern	12
Castleford	14
Rochdale Hornets	19

Semi-finals
Warrington	8
Widnes	4
Bradford Northern	13
Rochdale Hornets	2

Final
Warrington	12
Bradford Northern	2

== Notes and comments ==
1 * Bradford Dudley Hill are a Junior (amateur) club from Bradford
2 * Saddleworth Rangers are a Junior (amateur) club from Oldham
3 * Egremont are a Junior (amateur) club from Cumbria
4 * At this time Fulham were a bit nomadic, using a collection of grounds as their "home", but the likelihood was that this match was probably played at Chiswick Polytechnic Sports Ground
5 * RUGBYLEAGUEproject and Rothmans yearbook 1991-92 give the score as 6-35 but Wigan official archives gives it as 6-5, which must be a misprint as Batley were the team progressing to the next round
6 * Headingley, Leeds, is the home ground of Leeds RLFC with a capacity of 21,000. The record attendance was 40,175 for a league match between Leeds and Bradford Northern on 21 May 1947.

== See also ==
- 1990-91 Rugby Football League season
- 1990 Lancashire Cup
- 1990 Yorkshire Cup
- John Player Special Trophy
- Rugby league county cups
