= 1992 World Club Challenge =

Intercontinental rugby league match

Coordinates: 53.550417°N 2.625833°W

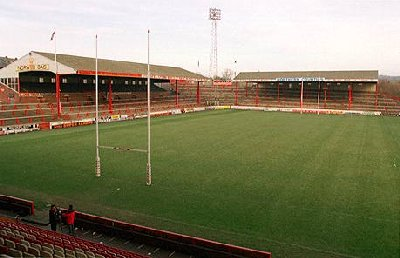
- Central Park hosted the match
Wigan	Brisbane Broncos
(RFL)	(NSWRL)
8	22
	1	2	Total
WIG	2	6	8
BRI	10	12	22
- Date: 30 October 1992
- Stadium: Central Park
- Location: Wigan, England
- Terry Matterson
- Referee: Dennis Hale (New Zealand)
- Attendance: 17,764

Broadcast partners
- Broadcasters: Nine Network (Australia) (on delay); Sky Sports (United Kingdom)
- Commentators: Eddie Hemmings; Mike Stephenson; Peter Sterling

The 1992 World Club Challenge match was contested by the 1991–92 Rugby Football League season champions Wigan and the 1992 NSWRL season's premiers, the Brisbane Broncos. The match took place on Friday night, 30 October in England, during the 1992–93 Rugby Football League season. It was also played less than a week after the 1992 Rugby League World Cup final (from which many players on both sides were backing up). A crowd of 17,764 turned out at Central Park, Wigan for the match which was refereed by New Zealand's Dennis Hale, the same referee as for the World Cup final one week earlier.

The game was broadcast throughout Great Britain by Sky Sports and was shown on delay in Australia by the Nine Network. Commentary was provided by Sky's regular rugby league commentary team of Eddie Hemmings and former Great Britain hooker Mike Stephenson along with Nine's former Australian test halfback Peter Sterling.

== Teams ==
Wigan	Brisbane Broncos

FB	1	Andre Stoop
RW	2	Jason Robinson
CE	3	Dean Bell
CE	4	Andrew Farrar
LW	5	Martin Offiah
SO	6	Frano Botica
SH	7	Shaun Edwards (c)
PR	8	Kelvin Skerrett
HK	9	Martin Dermott
PR	10	Andy Platt
SR	11	Denis Betts
SR	12	Billy McGinty
LF	13	Phil Clarke
Substitutions:
IC	14	Sam Panapa
IC	15	Ian Lucas
IC	16	Martin Crompton
IC	17	Neil Cowie
Coach:
(Australia) John Monie

FB	1	Julian O'Neill
LW	2	Michael Hancock
CE	3	Steve Renouf
CE	4	Chris Johns
RW	5	Willie Carne
FE	6	Kevin Walters
HB	7	Allan Langer (c)
PR	8	Glenn Lazarus
HK	9	Kerrod Walters
PR	10	Andrew Gee
SR	11	Trevor Gillmeister
SR	12	Mark Hohn
LK	13	Terry Matterson
Substitutions:
IC	14	John Plath
IC	15	Tony Currie
IC	16	Brett Plowman
IC	17	Peter Ryan
Coach:
(Australia) Wayne Bennett

== Match details ==
Friday 30 October

Wigan	8 – 22	Brisbane Broncos
Tries: Shaun Edwards Goals: Frano Botica (2)		Tries: Michael Hancock (2); Julian O'Neill; Kerrod Walters; Goals: Terry Matterson (3)

Central Park, Wigan
Attendance: 17,764
Referee: Dennis Hale (New Zealand)
Player of the Match: Terry Matterson

Brisbane's Alan Cann missed the match due to injury.

Early in the match a chaotic all-in brawl erupted, with Brisbane's Andrew Gee seen as the instigator. Wigan later opened the scoring by kicking a penalty given for an obstruction by Kerrod Walters close to the Broncos' try-line. However a knock-on later by Wigan in their in-goal area gave Brisbane a scrum feed in an attacking position and Julian O'Neill capitalised, fending off one defender and avoiding another in his run for the line to score the first try of the match which was then converted by Terry Matterson. Another try, scored by Kerrod Walters as a result of good support play from the Broncos, brought the score to 2-10 at half time.

Early in the second half another all-in brawl started, Andrew Gee again involved in the initial flareup. The Broncos scored first in the second half with Steve Renouf finding Michael Hancock out wide close to the Wigan try-line. However this was followed by a miraculous try from the home team. Around the halfway line, the Wigan hooker, Martin Dermott, chipped the ball over the top of the Broncos defenders and Shaun Edwards ran through to field it. Without missing a beat Edwards then sent a grubbing kick down past a complacent Julian O'Neill at fullback and won the race for it, with Wigan's goal-kicker Frano Botica adding the extra two. Later in the game Renouf again combined with Hancock out wide, throwing a looping pass over the Wigan defence to send the Broncos' number two over once more. The successful conversion attempt by Matterson, who was named man-of-the-match, left the final score at 22-8.

The Brisbane Broncos' victory saw the first time that Australian premiers had won the World Club Challenge on British soil. It was also only the second time that an Australian team had won at all, the last time being in 1976, in the first ever match of its kind.

== See also ==
- 1992 Brisbane Broncos season
