= Les Holliday =

Great Britain international rugby league footballer

Personal information
- Full name: Leslie W. Holliday
- Born: 8 August 1962 (age 63) Whitehaven, England

Playing information
- Position: Second-row, Loose forward
Club
Years	Team	Pld	T	G	FG	P
1982–88	Swinton	182	39	28	0	212
1988–90	Halifax	59	6	7	4	42
1990–93	Widnes	84	9	6	3	51
1993–95	Dewsbury	27	2	0	0	8
1995–97	Swinton	50	9	6	4	52
	Total	402	65	47	11	365
Representative
Years	Team	Pld	T	G	FG	P
1986	Cumbria	1	1	0	0	4
1991–92	Great Britain	3	1	0	0	4

Coaching information
Club
Years	Team	Gms	W	D	L	W%
1997–99	Swinton	70	34	1	35	49
- Education: Cromwell Road School
- Father: Bill Holliday

Leslie "Les" W. Holliday (born 8 August 1962) is an English former professional rugby league footballer who played in the 1980s and 1990s, and coached in the 1990s. He played at representative level for Great Britain and Cumbria, and at club level for Swinton (captain), Halifax, Widnes and Dewsbury, as a second-row or loose forward, and coached at club level for Swinton.

== Background ==
Les Holliday was born in Whitehaven, Cumberland, England, he was a pupil at Cromwell Road School in Pendlebury.

== Playing career ==
=== Swinton ===
Holliday started his career as an amateur with Folly Lane before signing for Swinton in June 1982. He helped the club win the 1984–85 Second Division championship.

Les Holliday played loose forward and was captain in Swinton's 27–10 victory over Hunslet in the 1986–87 Divisional Premiership Final at Old Trafford, Manchester on Sunday 17 May 1987.

=== Halifax ===
Holliday was signed by Halifax in January 1988 for a fee of £65,000. He started at second-row for Halifax in the 12–32 defeat against Wigan in the 1988 Challenge Cup Final at Wembley Stadium, London on Saturday 30 April 1988, but left the game after 20 minutes due to a knee injury.

Holliday played loose forward, and scored four goals in Halifax's 12–24 defeat by Wigan in the 1989–90 Regal Trophy Final during the 1989–90 season at Headingley, Leeds on Saturday 13 January 1990.

=== Widnes ===
In March 1990, Holliday was signed by Widnes for a club record fee of £100,000. He won the 1989–90 Premiership with Widnes at the end of the 1989–90 season, scoring a try in a 28–6 win against Bradford Northern.

Les Holliday played loose forward in Widnes' 24–18 victory over Salford in the 1990 Lancashire Cup Final during the 1990–91 season at Central Park, Wigan on Saturday 29 September 1990.

He played loose forward, and scored a try, and a drop goal in Widnes' 24–0 victory over Leeds in the 1991–92 Regal Trophy Final during the 1991–92 season at Central Park, Wigan on Saturday 11 January 1992.

In June 1993, he was sold to Dewsbury for a transfer fee of £27,500.

=== Representative honours ===
Les Holliday won caps for Great Britain while at Widnes in 1991 against France, and in 1992 against France (2 matches). He was selected for the 1992 Lions tour, but made only three non-Test appearances before returning home early due to injury.

Holliday also represented Cumbria against Australia during the 1986 Kangaroos tour.

== Personal life ==
Les Holliday is the son of the rugby league footballer; Bill Holliday, and the brother of the rugby league footballer who played in the 1980s for Swinton and Leigh; Mike Holliday.
