= Ian Lucas (rugby league) =

Welsh RL coach and former GB international rugby league footballer

Personal information
- Born: 5 November 1967 (age 57)

Playing information
- Position: Prop
Club
Years	Team	Pld	T	G	FG	P
1985–92	Wigan	174	12	0	0	48
Representative
Years	Team	Pld	T	G	FG	P
1991–92	Great Britain	2	0	0	0	0

Coaching information
Club
Years	Team	Gms	W	D	L	W%
1994–96	Leigh

Ian Lucas (born 5 November 1967) is a former professional rugby league footballer who played in the 1980s and 1990s, and coached in the 1990s. He played at representative level for Great Britain, and at club level for Wigan, as a prop, and coached at club level for Leigh. Ian Lucas won caps for Great Britain while at Wigan in 1991 against France, and in 1992 against Australia.

== Playing career ==
Lucas was a substitute in Wigan’s 8–2 victory over Manly-Warringah Sea Eagles in the 1987 World Club Challenge at Central Park, Wigan on 7 October 1987.

Lucas played left-prop (replaced by substitute Denis Betts) in Wigan's 22–17 victory over Salford in the 1988 Lancashire Cup Final during the 1988–89 season at Knowsley Road, St. Helens on Sunday 23 October 1988. He also played in the club's 27–0 win against St Helens in the 1989 Challenge Cup final.

Lucas played left-prop (replaced by substitute Shaun Wane on 21-minutes) in Wigan's 24–12 victory over Halifax in the 1989–90 Regal Trophy Final during the 1989–90 season at Headingley, Leeds on Saturday 13 January 1990.

During the 1991–92 Rugby Football League season, he played for defending champions Wigan from the interchange bench in their 1991 World Club Challenge victory against the visiting Penrith Panthers. He missed out on Wigan's 1992 Challenge Cup win due to injury.

He was selected to go on the 1992 Great Britain Lions tour, but was injured during the first Test against Australia in a tackle by Paul Harragon. When the touring party returned to England, he made a limited number of appearances for Wigan in the 1992–93 season, including an appearance as a substitute in the 1992 World Club Challenge against the visiting Brisbane Broncos, but was forced to retire at the end of the season due to a neck injury.

Following his career as a Rugby Player, Lucas decided to retire from the sport and become a business owner. He became Chairman of Truline Construction & Interior Services Ltd in 2005.
