= David Mullane =

Australian rugby league footballer

Personal information
- Full name: David Mullane
- Born: 7 July 1969 (age 56)

Playing information
- Position: Hooker, Second-row
Club
| Years | Team | Pld | T | G | FG | P |
|---|---|---|---|---|---|---|
| 1990–93 | Newcastle Knights | 61 | 2 | 0 | 0 | 8 |
- Source: As of 6 February 2019

David Mullane is an Australian former professional rugby league footballer who played in the 1990s. He played for the Newcastle Knights from 1990 to 1993.

== Playing career ==
Mullane made his first grade debut for Newcastle in Round 1 1990 against the North Sydney Bears at Marathon Stadium.

Mullane played in the club's first finals appearance in 1992, featuring in both games against the Western Suburbs Magpies and the St. George Dragons. Mullane played on in 1993 and his final game in first grade was a 22–4 loss against the Manly Warringah Sea Eagles in Round 4 1993.
