= Danny Crnkovich =

Australian rugby league footballer

Personal information
- Born: 25 February 1968 (age 58) Sydney, New South Wales, Australia
- Height: 178 cm (5 ft 10 in)
- Weight: 90 kg (14 st 2 lb)

Playing information
- Position: Fullback, Wing, Centre
Club
Years	Team	Pld	T	G	FG	P
1987–95	Parramatta Eels	79	23	0	2	94

Danny Crnkovich (/krɒnkəvɪtʃ/; born 25 February 1968) is an Australian former professional rugby league footballer who played in the 1980s up to 1990s. He played his entire club football career with the Parramatta Eels. He mostly played at fullback, but also played the occasional game at wing or centre.

== Playing career ==
Crnkovich was an Australian Schoolboys representative in 1984 and 1985. In 1986, he was graded by the Parramatta Eels. He played in the Eels 1986 Reserve Grade grand final loss to the Eastern Suburbs Roosters. He made his first grade debut from the bench in his side's 26–24 loss to the Cronulla-Sutherland Sharks at Parramatta Stadium in round 7 of the 1987 season. Crnkovich was a noted speedster, but he also developed a solid tackling technique, stopping a lot of tries from the opposition in the process. Crnkovich's career was plagued with injuries. Despite playing nine seasons with the Eels, he only managed to make 73 appearances with them. Crnkovich retired at the conclusion of the 1995 season. At the end, Crnkovich was made a life member of the club.
