= Brett Docherty =

Australian rugby league player

Personal information
- Born: 4 March 1968 (age 58) Hay, New South Wales, Australia

Playing information
- Position: Fullback, Wing
Club
Years	Team	Pld	T	G	FG	P
1989–91	Western Suburbs	25	0	18	0	36
1992	Illawarra Steelers	15	0	3	0	6
1993	Eastern Suburbs	1	0	0	0	0
	Total	41	0	21	0	42

Brett Docherty (born 4 March 1968) is an Australian former professional rugby league footballer who played for the Western Suburbs Magpies, Illawarra Steelers and Eastern Suburbs.

Born in the New South Wales town of Hay, Docherty played three first-grade seasons at Western Suburbs, as a fullback and occasional goalkicker.

In 1992 he joined Illawarra and had his biggest impact at the club before the season started, helping the Steelers to the Challenge Cup title. Playing as a winger, he scored the winning try in Illawarra's semi-final win over Cronulla, then kicked both of his side's penalties when they defeated the Brisbane Broncos 4-2 in the final. He kept his spot on the wing when the NSWRL season began, before later returning to fullback, in what would be his only season at Illawarra.

Docherty made a single first-grade appearance for Eastern Suburbs in 1993, before being signed by the Western Reds the following season as the Perth-based club looked to build its list for entry into the league in 1995.
