= Greg Drake =

Australian rugby league footballer

Personal information
- Born: 14 February 1969 (age 56)
- Height: 190 cm (6 ft 3 in)
- Weight: 108 kg (17 st)

Playing information
- Position: Prop
Club
Years	Team	Pld	T	G	FG	P
1989–92	Parramatta Eels	74	2	0	0	8
1995	South Sydney	9	0	0	0	0
	Total	83	2	0	0	8

Greg Drake (born 14 February 1969) is an Australian former professional rugby league footballer who played as a prop in the 1980s and the 1990s. He played for the Parramatta Eels and the South Sydney Rabbitohs.

Drake made his debut for Parramatta in round 5 of the 1989 season against the North Sydney Bears. He became a regular in the latter part of 1989, when he was compared to the great Bob O'Reilly. Drake played regularly in the front row until the end of the 1992 season, and Parramatta held high hopes for him throughout this period. Following that season, a continual succession of injuries meant he did not play at all in 1993 and 1994. Alongside concerns over his lack of mobility in a faster-paced game, (Note: During Drake’s absence due to injury, the former 5 metres (5.5 yd) separation between the teams at the play-the-ball was increased to 10 metres (10.94 yd), creating more room for attacking teams and speedy runners.) this meant Parramatta released him in September of the latter year.

For 1995, Drake joined Souths and played nine games for the club before retiring at the end of the season.
