= John Crooks (rugby league) =

Australian rugby league footballer

Personal information
- Full name: John Crooks

Playing information
Club
Years	Team	Pld	T	G	FG	P
1988	Newcastle Knights	2	0	0	0	0
- As of 14 Jul 2021

John Crooks is an Australian rugby league footballer active in the 1980s. He played for the Newcastle Knights in 1988.
