= 1989–90 Regal Trophy =

- Structure: National knockout championship
- Teams: 38
- Winners: Wigan
- Runners-up: Halifax

The 1989–90 Regal Trophy was a British rugby league knockout tournament. It was the 19th season that the competition was held, and was the first staging of the competition since it was re-named the Regal Trophy.

Wigan won the final, beating Halifax by the score of 24–12 in the match was played at Headingley, Leeds. The attendance was 17,810 and receipts were £73688

== Background ==
This season saw two changes in the existing members, and two new members, a new Chorley Borough (2) and an additional (now three in total) junior club
This brought the number of entrants up to thirty-eight
The changes in details are :-
1 Mansfield Marksman changed their name to Nottingham City and moved to a new Harvey Hadden Stadium in Nottingham
2 York had been renamed as Ryedale-York and moved to the new Ryedale Stadium on the outskirts of the city
3 Chorley Borough re-formed, this time as Trafford Borough and moved out of Chorley and to Moss Lane the home ground of Altrincham F.C.
4 and this left a vacancy in Chorley which was filled by a newly formed club using the name of the recently departed club, yet another Chorley Borough (2)

== Competition and results ==
=== Preliminary round ===
Involved 6 matches and 12 Clubs

Game No	Fixture Date	Home team	Score	Away team	Venue	Att	Rec	Notes	Ref
1	Wed 8 Nov 1989	Leeds	32-2	Ryedale-York	Headingley	4979			
2	Wed 8 Nov 1989	Warrington	4-12	Sheffield Eagles	Wilderspool	2507			
3	Sun 19 Nov 1989	Crossfields (Warrington)	14-19	Workington Town	Wilderspool	942		1, 2	
4	Sun 19 Nov 1989	Batley	28-14	West Hull	Mount Pleasant	844		3, 4	
5	Sun 19 Nov 1989	Kells (Whitehaven)	2-28	Doncaster	Recreation Ground	2127		5, 6, 7	
6	Sun 19 Nov 1989	Wakefield Trinity	12-19	Hull F.C.	Belle Vue	4731		8	

=== Round 1 - First Round ===
Involved 16 matches and 32 Clubs

Game No	Fixture Date	Home team	Score	Away team	Venue	Att	Rec	Notes	Ref
1	Fri 1 Dec 1989	Sheffield Eagles	36-22	Rochdale Hornets	Thrum Hall	2307		9	
2	Sat 2 Dec 1989	St. Helens	40-26	Hull Kingston Rovers	Knowsley Road	4888			
3	Sun 3 Dec 1989	Bradford Northern	38-10	Keighley	Odsal	3260			
4	Sun 3 Dec 1989	Bramley	16-48	Oldham	McLaren Field	1632			
5	Sun 3 Dec 1989	Chorley Borough (2)	18-42	Castleford	Victory Park	1256			
6	Sun 3 Dec 1989	Dewsbury	14-4	Carlisle	Crown Flatt	631			
7	Sun 3 Dec 1989	Fulham	18-32	Halifax	Chiswick Poly *	1549		10	
8	Sun 3 Dec 1989	Hull F.C.	18-21	Salford	Boulevard	4587			
9	Sun 3 Dec 1989	Hunslet	10-6	Barrow	Elland Road	537			
10	Sun 3 Dec 1989	Leeds	26-12	Leigh	Headingley	7712			
11	Sun 3 Dec 1989	Nottingham City	18-48	Widnes	Harvey Hadden Stadium	2246			
12	Sun 3 Dec 1989	Swinton	18-16	Batley	Station Road	1359			
13	Sun 3 Dec 1989	Trafford Borough	18-36	Featherstone Rovers	Moss Lane Altrincham	934			
14	Sun 3 Dec 1989	Whitehaven	20-10	Runcorn Highfield	Recreation Ground	603			
15	Sun 3 Dec 1989	Wigan	62-4	Doncaster	Central Park	7854			
16	Sun 3 Dec 1989	Workington Town	4-28	Huddersfield	Derwent Park	571			

=== Round 2 - Second Round ===
Involved 8 matches and 16 Clubs

Game No	Fixture Date	Home team	Score	Away team	Venue	Att	Rec	Notes	Ref
1	Sat 9 Dec 1989	Wigan	18-0	Widnes	Central Park	12398			
2	Sun 10 Dec 1989	Halifax	20-6	Salford	Thrum Hall	6005			
3	Sun 10 Dec 1989	Hunslet	4-34	Featherstone Rovers	Elland Road	2031			
4	Sun 10 Dec 1989	Leeds	27-8	Bradford Northern	Headingley	14459			
5	Sun 10 Dec 1989	Oldham	22-8	Huddersfield	Watersheddings	5292			
6	Sun 10 Dec 1989	St. Helens	12-12	Dewsbury	Knowsley Road	5847			
7	Sun 10 Dec 1989	Swinton	6-28	Sheffield Eagles	Station Road	1925			
8	Sun 10 Dec 1989	Whitehaven	2-62	Castleford	Recreation Ground	1838			

=== Round 2 - Second Round Replays ===
Involved 1 match and 2 Clubs

Game No	Fixture Date	Home team	Score	Away team	Venue	Att	Rec	Notes	Ref
1	Wed 13 Dec 1989	Dewsbury	0-14	St. Helens	Crown Flatt	1981			

=== Round 3 -Quarter Finals ===
Involved 4 matches with 8 clubs

Game No	Fixture Date	Home team	Score	Away team	Venue	Att	Rec	Notes	Ref
1	Sat 16 Dec 1989	Leeds	10-10	Wigan	Headingley	9310			
2	Sun 17 Dec 1989	Halifax	23-10	Featherstone Rovers	Thrum Hall	6075			
3	Sun 17 Dec 1989	St. Helens	32-18	Oldham	Knowsley Road	7742			
4	Sun 17 Dec 1989	Sheffield Eagles	2-18	Castleford	Saltergate, Chesterfield	3014		11	

=== Round 3 -Quarter Finals - Replays ===
Involved 1 match with 2 clubs

Game No	Fixture Date	Home team	Score	Away team	Venue	Att	Rec	Notes	Ref
1	Thu 21 Dec 1989	Wigan	8-0	Leeds	Central Park	20111			

=== Round 4 – Semi-Finals ===
Involved 2 matches and 4 Clubs

Game No	Fixture Date	Home team	Score	Away team	Venue	Att	Rec	Notes	Ref
1	Sat 23 Dec 1989	Halifax	10-9	St. Helens	Central Park	6085			
2	Sat 30 Dec 1989	Wigan	24-10	Castleford	Headingley	10193			

=== Final ===
Game No	Fixture Date	Home team	Score	Away team	Venue	Att	Rec	Notes	Ref
	Saturday 13 January 1990	Wigan	24-12	Halifax	Headingley	17810	73688	12	

==== Teams and scorers ====
Wigan	No.	Halifax
	teams	
Joe Lydon	1	Colin Whitfield
David Marshall	2	Eddie Riddlesden
Kevin Iro	3	Tony Anderson
Dean Bell	4	Brian Hetherington
Mark Preston	5	Wilf George
Shaun Edwards	6	John Dorahy (c)
Andy Gregory	7	John Lyons
Ian Lucas	8	Brendan Hill
Martin Dermott	9	Seamus McCallion
Andy Platt	10	Lindsey Johnston
Denis Betts	11	Peter Bell
Ian Gildart	12	Richard Milner
Ellery Hanley	13	Les Holliday
Andy Goodway (for Ian Gildart 21 min)	14	Steve Smith (rugby league, Halifax) (for Colin Whitfield 17 min)
Shaun Wane (for Ian Lucas 21 min)	15	Mick Scott (for Steve Smith 66 min)
	Coach	
24	score	12
8	HT	4
	Scorers	
	Tries	
Shaun Edwards (1)	T	Brendan Hill (1)
Andy Goodway (1)	T	
Ellery Hanley (3)	T	
	Goals	
Joe Lydon (2)	G	Les Holliday (4)
Referee		D. Gerald "Gerry" Kershaw (Easingwold (York))
Man of the match		Ellery Hanley - Wigan - loose forward
Competition Sponsor		Regal

Scoring - Try = four points - Goal = two points - Drop goal = one point

==== Timeline in the final ====
Time	Incident	Score
5 min	try: Shaun Edwards	4-0
15 min	penalty goal: Les Holliday	4-2
31 min	penalty goal: Les Holliday	4-4
38 min	sin bin - punching: Lindsey Johnson	
38 min	cut nose - left field: Martin Dermott	
39 min	try: Ellery Hanley	8-4
Half Time	:	8-4
45 min	try: Ellery Hanley	12-4
	conversion: Joe Lydon	14-4
approx 52 min	penalty goal: Les Holliday	14-6
53 min	sin bin brawling: Brendan Hill	
53 min	sin bin brawling: Andy Platt	
59 min	try: Ellery Hanley	18-6
	conversion: Joe Lydon	20-6
71 min	try: Andy Goodway	24-6
76 min	try: Brendan Hill	24-10
	conversion: Les Holliday	24-12
FT	:	24-12

=== Prize money ===
As part of the sponsorship deal and funds, the prize money awarded to the competing teams for this season is as follows :-

Finish Position	Cash prize	No. receiving prize	Total cash
Winner	28000	1	28000
Runner-up	15500	1	15500
losing semi-finalist	8250	2	16500
Losers in Rd 3	4800	4	19200
Losers in Rd 2	2750	8	22000
Losers in Rd 1	1745	16	27920
Appearance in Prelim Round	1740	12	20880
			150000
to capital development fund			100000
Grand Total			250000

=== The road to success ===
This tree excludes any preliminary round fixtures

First round
Leeds	26
Leigh	12
Bradford Northern	38
Keighley	10
Wigan	62
Doncaster	4
Nottingham City	18
Widnes	48
Swinton	18
Batley	16
Sheffield Eagles	36
Rochdale Hornets	22
Whitehaven	20
Runcorn Highfield	10
Chorley Borough (2)	18
Castleford	42
Fulham	18
Halifax	32
Hull F.C.	18
Salford	21
Hunslet	10
Barrow	6
Trafford Borough	18
Featherstone Rovers	36
St. Helens	40
Hull Kingston Rovers	26
Dewsbury	14
Carlisle	4
Bramley	16
Oldham	48
Workington Town	4
Huddersfield	28

Second round
Leeds	27
Bradford Northern	8
Wigan	18
Widnes	0
Swinton	6
Sheffield Eagles	28
Whitehaven	2
Castleford	62
Halifax	20
Salford	6
Hunslet	4
Featherstone Rovers	34
St. Helens	12 (14)
Dewsbury	12(0)
Oldham	22
Huddersfield	8

Third round
Leeds	10 (0)
Wigan	10 (8)
Sheffield Eagles	2
Castleford	18
Halifax	23
Featherstone Rovers	10
St. Helens	32
Oldham	18

Semifinals
Wigan	24
Castleford	10
Halifax	10
St. Helens	9

Final
Wigan	24
Halifax	12

== Notes and comments ==
1 * Crossfields are a Junior (amateur) club from Warrington
2 * Score at half time was 8-8
3 * West Hull are a Junior (amateur) club from Hull
4 * Rothmans Yearbooks 1991–92 and 1991–92 and RUGBYLEAGUEproject give score as 28-14 but Wigan official archives gives it as 27-14
5 * Kells are a Junior (amateur) club from Cumbria
6 * The score at half time was 0-2
7 * The game was played at Whitehaven's ground
8 * This result is missing from the details given in RUGBYLEAGUEproject
9 * This match played at Thrum Hall, home of Halifax - NOTE After the Hillsborough Stadium disaster Sheffield Eagles were unable to play at their home ground and during this season used 7 different venues as temporary "home" grounds
10 * At this time Fulham were a bit nomadic, using a collection of grounds as their "home", but the likelihood was that this match was probably played at Chiswick Polytechnic Sports Ground
11 * This match played at Saltergate, the home of Chesterfield F.C. - NOTE After the Hillsborough Stadium disaster Sheffield Eagles were unable to play at their home ground and during this season used 7 different venues as temporary "home" grounds
12 * Headingley, Leeds, is the home ground of Leeds RLFC with a capacity of 21,000. The record attendance was 40,175 for a league match between Leeds and Bradford Northern on 21 May 1947.

== See also ==
- 1989–90 Rugby Football League season
- 1989 Lancashire Cup
- 1989 Yorkshire Cup
- Regal Trophy
- Rugby league county cups
