= Phil Tiernan =

Australian rugby league footballer

Personal information
- Full name: Phil Tiernan
- Born: 1 April 1967 (age 57)

Playing information
- Position: Second-row, Prop
Club
Years	Team	Pld	T	G	FG	P
1989–91	Illawarra Steelers	22	0	0	0	0
1994	Parramatta Eels	6	0	0	0	0
	Total	28	0	0	0	0
- Source: As of 16 February 2023

Phil Tiernan is an Australian former professional rugby league footballer who played in the 1980s and 1990s. He played for Illawarra and Parramatta in the NSWRL competition.

== Playing career ==
Tiernan made his first grade debut for Illawarra in round 22 of the 1989 NSWRL season against Cronulla at Shark Park. Tiernan would go on to play a further 21 games for Illawarra before departing the club at the end of 1991. In 1992, Tiernan joined Parramatta and played six games for the club over two seasons.
