= Ian Gildart =

English rugby league footballer

Personal information
- Born: 14 October 1969 (age 56) Ince-in-Makerfield, Lancashire, England

Playing information
- Position: Second-row
Club
Years	Team	Pld	T	G	FG	P
1986–94	Wigan	139	4	0	0	16
1994–95	Wakefield Trinity	25	0	0	0	0
1995–97	Oldham	57	0	0	0	0
1998	Widnes Vikings	21	0	0	0	0
1999	Lancashire Lynx	13	2	0	0	8
	Total	255	6	0	0	24
Representative
Years	Team	Pld	T	G	FG	P
1989	Lancashire	1	0	0	0	0
- Children: Oliver Gildart

Ian Frederick Gildart (born 14 October 1969) is an English former professional rugby league footballer who in the 1980s and 1990s played for Wigan, Wakefield Trinity and Oldham as a second-row, before assisting at Wigan St Patricks ARLFC.

== Background ==
Gildart was born in Ince-in-Makerfield, Lancashire, England. Ian is the father of the rugby league footballer:; Oliver Gildart.

== Playing career ==
=== Wigan ===
Gildart made his first team debut for Wigan in a Challenge Cup preliminary round tie against Workington Town in January 1987.

Ian Gildart was a non-playing substitute in Wigan's 8–2 victory over Manly-Warringah Sea Eagles in the 1987 World Club Challenge at Central Park, Wigan on Wednesday 7 October 1987, and a substitute in the 21–4 victory over Penrith Panthers in the 1991 World Club Challenge at Anfield, Liverpool on Wednesday 2 October 1991.

During Ian Gildart's time, there were Wigan's victories in the Championship during the 1989–90 season, 1990–91 season, 1991–92 season, 1992–93 season and 1993–94 season.

Gildart was a substitute in Wigan's 36–14 victory over Warrington in the 1990 Challenge Cup Final during the 1989–90 season at Wembley Stadium, London on Saturday 28 April 1990.

Gildart played at second-row in Wigan's 24–12 victory over Halifax in the 1989–90 Regal Trophy Final during the 1989–90 season at Headingley, Leeds on Saturday 13 January 1990.

In 1994, Gildart signed a one-year contract with Wakefield Trinity.
