= Jonathan Britten =

Australian rugby league footballer

Personal information
- Full name: Jonathan Britten
- Born: 21 May 1971 (age 53)

Playing information
- Position: Wing, Centre
Club
Years	Team	Pld	T	G	FG	P
1992–98	Illawarra Steelers	55	18	0	0	72
- Source: As of 1 February 2023

Jonathan Britten is an Australian former professional rugby league footballer who played in the 1990s. He played for Illawarra in the NSWRL, ARL and NRL competitions.

== Playing career ==
Britten made his first grade debut for Illawarra in round 7 of the 1992 NSWRL season against Brisbane at Lang Park. Britten went on to become one of Illawarra's longest serving players in the 1990s and was a squad member in their final season before their joint-venture with St. George commenced at the end of 1998. Britten was one of the Illawarra players who was not offered a contract to play for St. George Illawarra starting in 1999.
