= Robert Muchmore =

Australian rugby league footballer

Personal information
- Full name: Robert Arthur Muchmore
- Born: 12 December 1969 (age 55)

Playing information
- Position: Centre, Wing
Club
Years	Team	Pld	T	G	FG	P
1990–96	Parramatta Eels	71	7	0	0	28

Robert Muchmore (born 12 December 1969) is an Australian former professional rugby league footballer who played in the 1990s. He played his entire career for the Parramatta Eels. He mostly played at centre, but also played on the wing. Muchmore made his debut for Parramatta in round 22 of the 1990 season against the Manly Warringah Sea Eagles. Muchmore's final game for Parramatta was in round 22 of the 1996 season against the Penrith Panthers.
