= David Woods (rugby league, born 1970) =

Australian rugby league footballer

Personal information
- Full name: David Woods
- Born: 10 March 1970 (age 55)

Playing information
- Position: Fullback, Wing, Centre, Stand-off
Club
Years	Team	Pld	T	G	FG	P
1989–97	Parramatta Eels	97	25	0	0	100
1993–94	Wakefield Trinity	18	6	0	0	24
1998–01	Penrith Panthers	63	17	0	0	68
2002	Halifax	23	9	0	0	36
	Total	201	57	0	0	228
Representative
Years	Team	Pld	T	G	FG	P
1995–96	Country NSW	2	1	0	0	4

David Woods (born 10 March 1970) is an Australian former professional rugby league footballer who played in the 1980s, 1990s and 2000s. He played at representative level for Country New South Wales, and at club level for the Parramatta Eels, Wakefield Trinity, the Penrith Panthers and Halifax.

== Playing career ==
Woods began his career with Parramatta in 1989, making his first grade debut against Manly-Warringah. Woods played for Parramatta at a time when most of the club's star players had retired or were coming towards the end of their careers. In 1993, Woods joined Wakefield in England and played there during the off season before returning to Parramatta. In 1997, Woods only made 5 appearances for The Eels and left at the end of the season. He was later made a life member at the club. In 1998, Woods joined Penrith and spent 4 years at the club before leaving and returning to England once again to play for Halifax. Woods spent one season with Halifax before retiring from rugby league at the end of 2002.
