= Brian Quinton =

Australian rugby league footballer

Personal information
- Full name: Brian Quinton
- Born: 14 April 1963 (age 61)

Playing information
- Position: Wing
Club
Years	Team	Pld	T	G	FG	P
1987	St George Dragons	4	0	0	0	10
1988–89	Newcastle Knights	28	6	16	0	56
1995	Gold Coast	2	0	0	0	0
	Total	34	6	16	0	66
- Source: As of 5 February 2019

Brian Quinton is a former professional rugby league footballer who played in the 1980s and 1990s. He played for the St. George Dragons in 1987, he was part of the inaugural Newcastle Knights squad from 1988–89 and ended his professional career with the Gold Coast Seagulls in 1995.

== Playing career ==
Quinton made his first grade debut for St George in Round 6 1987 against Illawarra. In 1988, Quinton signed with Newcastle and played in the club's first ever match, a 28-4 loss against Parramatta. Quinton finished the 1988 season as joint top try scorer. Quinton played on with Newcastle in 1989 before departing at the end of that season.

In 1995, Quinton joined the Gold Coast and played in 2 matches for the club, a 50-10 loss against North Sydney in Round 1 and a 28-8 loss against Manly-Warringah in Round 2 1995.
