= Martin Dermott =

Great Britain international rugby league footballer

Personal information
- Born: 25 September 1967 (age 58) Wigan, Lancashire, England

Playing information
- Position: Hooker
Club
Years	Team	Pld	T	G	FG	P
1985–96	Wigan	231	21	0	3	87
1997	Warrington Wolves	3	1	0	1	5
	Total	234	22	0	4	92
Representative
Years	Team	Pld	T	G	FG	P
1987–89	Great Britain (U-21s)	5	1	0	0	4
1987–91	Lancashire	2	0	0	0	0
1990–93	Great Britain	11	1	0	0	4
1992	GB tour games	4	0	0	0	0

Martin Dermott (born 25 September 1967) is an English former professional rugby league footballer who played as a hooker in the 1980s and 1990s, and was capped 11 times for Great Britain.

He played for Wigan and the Warrington Wolves.

== Background ==
Martin Dermott was born in Wigan, Lancashire, England.

== Playing career ==
Martin Dermott played hooker in Wigan's 15-8 victory over Oldham in the 1986 Lancashire Cup Final during the 1986–87 season at Knowsley Road, St. Helens, on Sunday 19 October 1986, played hooker in the 22-17 victory over Salford in the 1988 Lancashire Cup Final during the 1988–89 season at Knowsley Road, St. Helens on Sunday 23 October 1988, and played hooker in the 5-4 victory over St. Helens in the 1992 Lancashire Cup Final during the 1992–93 season at Knowsley Road, St. Helens on Sunday 18 October 1992.

Martin Dermott played hooker in Wigan's 18-4 victory over Warrington in the 1986–87 John Player Special Trophy Final during the 1986–87 season at Burnden Park, Bolton on Saturday 10 January 1987, played hooker in the 12-6 victory over Widnes in the 1988–89 John Player Special Trophy Final during the 1988–89 season at Burnden Park, Bolton on Saturday 7 January 1989, played hooker in the 24-12 victory over Halifax in the 1989–90 Regal Trophy Final during the 1989–90 season at Headingley, Leeds on Saturday 13 January 1990, played hooker in the 15-8 victory over Bradford Northern in the 1992–93 Regal Trophy Final during the 1992–93 season at Elland Road, Leeds on Saturday 23 January 1993, and played hooker in the 2-33 defeat by Castleford in the 1993–94 Regal Trophy Final during the 1993–94 season at Elland Road, Leeds on Saturday 22 January 1994.

During the 1991–92 Rugby Football League season, Dermott played for defending champions Wigan as a hooker in their 1991 World Club Challenge victory against the visiting Penrith Panthers. He was selected to go on the 1992 Great Britain Lions tour of Australia and New Zealand. During the 1992–93 Rugby Football League season Dermott played as a hooker for defending RFL champions Wigan in the 1992 World Club Challenge against the visiting Brisbane Broncos.

After the 1993–94 Rugby Football League season Dermott travelled with defending champions Wigan to Brisbane, playing as a hooker in their 1994 World Club Challenge victory over Australian premiers, the Brisbane Broncos.
