= John Fearnley =

Australian rugby league footballer

Personal information
- Full name: John Anthony Fearnley
- Born: 13 September 1968 (age 56); Carcoar New South Wales, Australia

Playing information
- Position: Prop
Club
Years	Team	Pld	T	G	FG	P
1991–94	Parramatta Eels	76	2	0	0	8
1995	South Sydney	3	0	0	0	0
	Total	79	2	0	0	8

John Fearnley (born 13 September 1968) is an Australian former professional rugby league footballer who played in the 1990s. He played for the Parramatta Eels and South Sydney in the New South Wales Rugby League (NSWRL) competition.

== Playing career ==
Fearnley made his first-grade debut for Parramatta in Round 3 of the 1991 season against the Norths. Fearnley went on to make 76 appearances for Parramatta before switching to Souths. Fearnley went on to make only three appearances for South Sydney before retiring at the end of the 1995 season.
