= 1988–89 Lancashire Cup =

- Structure: Regional knockout championship
- Teams: 16
- Winners: Wigan
- Runners-up: Salford

The 1988–89 Lancashire Cup was the 76th occasion on which the Lancashire Cup competition was held. Wigan won the trophy, beating Salford 22–17 in the final.

This was Wigan’s fifth appearance, and fourth consecutive victory in a run of four victories and five appearances in five successive years. The attendance was the fifth in five years to reach almost 20,000, and the receipts set a new record, exceeding the previous record by approximately £4,500.

== Background ==
This season the total number of entrants remained at the 16 level.
With this full sixteen members there was no need for “blank” or “dummy” fixtures or any byes.

== Competition and results ==
=== First round ===
Involved eight matches and 16 clubs.

Game No	Fixture Date	Home team	Score	Away team	Venue	Att	Rec	Notes	Ref
1	Sun 18 Sep 1988	Barrow	10-24	Wigan	Craven Park	5528			
2	Sun 18 Sep 1988	Carlisle	17-7	Chorley Borough	Gifford Park	645			
3	Sun 18 Sep 1988	Oldham	64-2	Workington Town	Watersheddings	3877			
4	Sun 18 Sep 1988	Rochdale Hornets	25-14	Fulham	Athletic Grounds	645			
5	Sun 18 Sep 1988	Runcorn Highfield	4-42	Warrington	Canal Street	2017			
6	Sun 18 Sep 1988	Salford	42-8	Whitehaven	The Willows	2551			
7	Sun 18 Sep 1988	Swinton	24-14	Leigh	Station Road	3225			
8	Sun 18 Sep 1988	Widnes	32-24	St. Helens	Naughton Park	10764			

=== Round 2 - Quarter-finals ===
Involved 4 matches and 8 clubs

Game No	Fixture Date	Home team	Score	Away team	Venue	Att	Rec	Notes	Ref
1	Wed 28 Sep 1988	Oldham	2-18	Salford	Watersheddings	5497			
2	Wed 28 Sep 1988	Warrington	34-18	Carlisle	Wilderspool	2586			
3	Wed 28 Sep 1988	Widnes	38-4	Swinton	Naughton Park	4988			
4	Wed 28 Sep 1988	Wigan	36-4	Rochdale Hornets	Central Park	7719			

=== Round 3 – Semi-finals ===
Involved 2 matches and 4 clubs

Game No	Fixture Date	Home team	Score	Away team	Venue	Att	Rec	Notes	Ref
1	Wed 05 Oct 1988	Salford	15-2	Warrington	The Willows	7316			
2	Wed 12 Oct 1988	Wigan	14-10	Widnes	Central Park	17813			

=== Final ===
The match was played at Knowsley Road, St Helens, with an attendance of 19,154 and receipts of £71,879.

23 October 1988

Wigan	22 – 17	Salford
Tries: K. Iro (2), Shelford, Bell; Goals: K. Iro (3)		Tries: Evans, Bentley, Herbert; Goals: Brown (2); Drop goals: Worrall

Knowsley Road, St Helens
Attendance: 19,154
Referee: Kevin Allatt (Southport)
Player of the Match: Paul Shaw

==== Teams ====
Wigan	№	Salford
	Teams	
Steve Hampson	1	Peter Williams (c)
Tony Iro	2	Tex Evans
Kevin Iro	3	Keith Bentley
Dean Bell	4	Ken Jones
Joe Lydon	5	Adrian Hadley
Shaun Edwards	6	Paul Shaw
Andy Gregory	7	David Cairns
Ian Lucas	8	Steve Herbert
Martin Dermott	9	Mark Moran
Adrian Shelford	10	Peter Brown
Andy Platt	11	Ian Gormley
Andy Goodway	12	Mick Worrall
Ellery Hanley (c)	13	Mark Horo
	Subs	
Ged Byrne (for Joe Lydon 76min)	14	Ian Blease (for Peter Williams 68min)
Denis Betts (for Ian Lucas 49min)	15	Mick McTigue (for Mark Horo 74min)
Graham Lowe	Coach	Kevin Ashcroft

=== The road to success ===
First round
Barrow	10
Wigan	14
Rochdale Hornets	25
Fulham	14
Widnes	32
St. Helens	24
Swinton	24
Leigh	14
Oldham	64
Workington Town	2
Salford	42
Whitehaven	8
Runcorn Highfield	4
Warrington	42
Carlisle	17
Chorley Borough	7

Second round
Wigan	36
Rochdale Hornets	4
Widnes	38
Swinton	4
Oldham	2
Salford	18
Warrington	34
Carlisle	18

Semi-finals
Wigan	14
Widnes	10
Salford	15
Warrington	2

Final
Wigan	22
Salford	17

== See also ==
- 1988–89 Rugby Football League season
- Rugby league county cups
