= Kevin Iro =

Professional rugby league coach and former rugby league footballer

Personal information
- Full name: Kevin Leslie Iro
- Born: 24 May 1968 (age 58) Auckland, New Zealand

Playing information
- Height: 191 cm (6 ft 3 in)
- Weight: 95 kg (14 st 13 lb)
- Position: Wing, Centre
Club
Years	Team	Pld	T	G	FG	P
19??–88	Mount Albert
1987–91	Wigan	100	60	36	0	312
1991–92	Manly Sea Eagles	24	9	0	0	36
1992–96	Leeds	124	64	1	0	258
1997	Hunter Mariners	4	1	0	0	4
1998	Auckland Warriors	16	2	0	0	8
1999–01	St Helens	84	42	0	0	168
	Total	352	178	37	0	786
Representative
Years	Team	Pld	T	G	FG	P
1987–89	Auckland
1987–98	New Zealand	34	16	7	0	78
1988	Rest of the World	1	1	0	0	4
2000–06	Cook Islands	3	1	0	0	4

Coaching information
Representative
Years	Team	Gms	W	D	L	W%
2005–06	Cook Islands
- Relatives: Tony Iro (brother); Kayal Iro (son)

Kevin Leslie Iro (born 24 May 1968) is a former professional rugby league footballer and coach who played in the 1980s, 1990s and 2000s, and coached in the 2000s.

A wing or centre, he played for Mount Albert, Manly-Warringah, Hunter Mariners and the Auckland Warriors, and in England for Wigan, Leeds and St Helens at club level, and played in Challenge Cup finals for all three English teams. Internationally, he played 34 times for New Zealand and later played 3 times for the Cook Islands. He also played for Auckland and the Rest of the World. He was nicknamed "The Beast".

He coached the Cook Islands from 2005 to 2006.

== Background ==
Iro was born in Auckland, New Zealand, and is of Cook Islands descent. Iro is the younger brother of fellow New Zealand international Tony Iro, and is the father of Kayal Iro, who is also a professional rugby league footballer.

== Playing career ==
=== Early career ===
As a junior, he played for the Glen Innes Falcons, a feeder club to Ellerslie during the 1980s.

=== Wigan ===
Kevin Iro played at centre, and scored two tries and three conversions in Wigan's 22–17 victory over Salford in the 1988 Lancashire Cup Final during the 1988–89 season at Knowsley Road, St. Helens on Sunday 23 October 1988, Kevin Iro played at centre and scored a try in Wigan's 12–6 victory over Widnes in the 1988–89 John Player Special Trophy Final, and played at centre in the 12–6 victory over Widnes in the 1989–90 Regal Trophy Final during the 1989–90 season at Headingley, Leeds on Saturday 13 January 1990.

=== Auckland Warriors ===
Iro was signed to play in the 1998 Auckland Warriors season. He scored two tries in New Zealand's 1998 ANZAC Test victory over Australia.

=== St Helens ===
He was St Helens' lone try-scorer in their 1999 Super League Grand Final victory over Bradford Bulls. Having won the 1999 Championship, St. Helens contested the 2000 World Club Challenge against National Rugby League Premiers the Melbourne Storm, with Iro playing at Centre in the loss.

Iro played for St Helens at Centre in their 2000 Super League Grand Final victory over Wigan Warriors.

As Super League V champions, St Helens played against 2000 NRL Premiers, the Brisbane Broncos in the 2001 World Club Challenge. Iro played at centre in St. Helens' victory.

== Coaching career ==
In 2006 Iro coached the Cook Islands national team in a three-match series against the New Zealand Māori. In the third and deciding match Iro came out of retirement, scoring two tries in a 32–4 victory. He also represented the Cook Islands at the 2006 Commonwealth Games playing rugby sevens.

== Post-playing career ==
Iro has been recognized for his contributions in the establishment of Marae Moana, the largest marine protected area in the world.
