= Phil Clarke =

English broadcaster & rugby league footballer (born 1971)

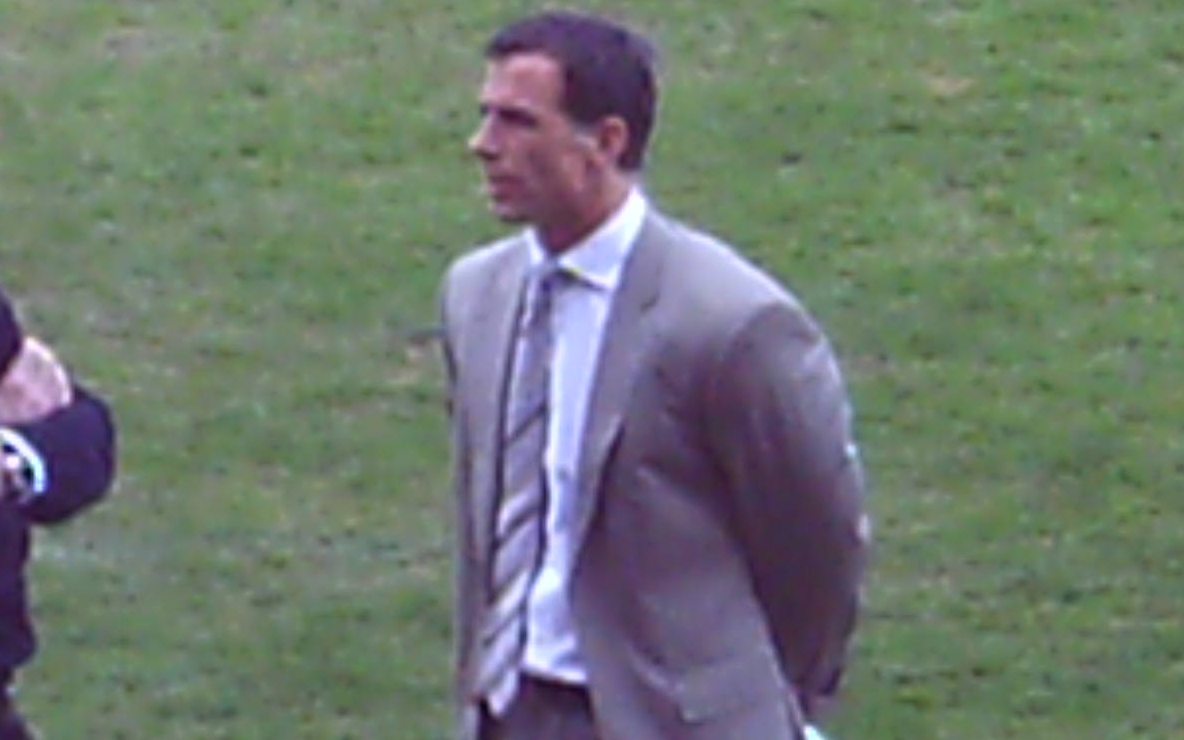
- Clarke in 2009

Personal information
- Full name: Philip Clarke
- Born: 16 May 1971 (age 55) Blackrod, Lancashire, England

Playing information
- Position: Second-row, Loose forward
Club
Years	Team	Pld	T	G	FG	P
1988–95	Wigan	154	23	0	0	92
1995–96	Sydney City Roosters	12	2	0	0	8
	Total	166	25	0	0	100
Representative
Years	Team	Pld	T	G	FG	P
1989–94	Great Britain	16	4	0	0	16
1995	England	6	1	0	0	4
- Father: Colin Clarke

Philip Clarke (born 16 May 1971) is an English former professional rugby league footballer who played in the 1980s and 1990s. A Great Britain and England international representative back-rower or stand-off, he played his club rugby league in England for Wigan (with whom he won five consecutive Challenge Cup Finals from 1991 to 1995), and in Australia for the Sydney City Roosters.

Since his retirement he has continued to work in the sport as a manager, executive and commentator.

== Background ==
Clarke was born on 16 May 1971 in Blackrod, Lancashire, England. For much of his early career he balanced playing rugby with studies at the University of Liverpool.

He is the son of Colin Clarke, the Wigan and England hooker of the 1960s and 1970s, and Wigan coach of the 1980s.

== Playing career ==
Clarke was part of a Wigan side that dominated English rugby league in the late 1980s and 1990s, winning the Championship in six consecutive seasons and the Challenge Cup in seven consecutive seasons during Clarke's time at the club. Clarke played in five Challenge Cup final victories, from 1991 to 1995.

He played in three World Club Challenges for Wigan - the 1991 victory against the visiting Penrith Panthers, the 1992 home defeat by the visiting Brisbane Broncos and the 1994 victory over the Broncos in Brisbane.

Clarke was selected to go on the 1992 Great Britain Lions tour of Australia and New Zealand. He played in the back-row in Great Britain's win over Australia in Melbourne. He represented England at the 1995 Rugby League World Cup. He became the first player to win England caps whilst at the Sydney City Roosters. He played in the 1995 World Cup Final at second-row but Australia won the match and retained the Cup.

He moved to Sydney City Roosters in 1995 but his playing career was cut short when he suffered a serious neck injury in a match against North Queensland Cowboys in 1996. Although he made a full recovery, he was warned by doctors never to play rugby league again.

== Post-playing career ==
Clarke was Wigan's chief executive from 1997 to 1998, when they won the Grand Final of Super League III.

He became a Sky Sports commentator in 1999 alongside Bill Arthur on Academy matches and moved on to work with Eddie Hemmings and Mike "Stevo" Stephenson on Super League broadcasts.

In March 2006 he left the position of Great Britain team manager after five years, having become part of the Great Britain set-up in 2001. He said his reasons for leaving were the "lack of leadership and direction" for the Great Britain team, and the lack of improvement in competitiveness against international opponents, adding that "despite what's been said by the RFL and certain parts of the media, we're no closer now than we were 15 years ago."

He was a director of The Sports Office, a sports software company until his resignation in January 2020.

In February 2019 Phil became a Full Member of the St Helens Rugby League Referees Society.
