= Dave Gallagher (rugby league) =

Australian rugby league footballer

Personal information
- Full name: David Gallagher
- Born: 21 April 1966 (age 59) Armidale, New South Wales, Australia

Playing information
- Position: Second-row
Club
Years	Team	Pld	T	G	FG	P
1988–91	Western Suburbs	51	4	0	0	16
1990–91	Rochdale Hornets	5	1	0	0	4
1989–93	Illawarra Steelers	13	0	0	0	0
	Total	69	5	0	0	20
- Source: As of 28 December 2022

Dave Gallagher is an Australian former professional rugby league footballer who played in the 1980s and 1990s. He played for Western Suburbs and the Illawarra Steelers in the NSWRL competition. Gallagher also played for Rochdale in England and Redcliffe in the Brisbane Rugby League premiership.

== Playing career ==
Gallagher began his professional rugby league career with Redcliffe in the Brisbane Rugby League premiership. Gallagher then signed with Western Suburbs in the NSWRL and played 51 games for the club over four years. During the 1990 NSWRL off-season, Gallagher played for Rochdale in England. In 1992, he joined Illawarra and played 13 games but missed out on the clubs first ever finals campaign.
