= Bill Dunn (rugby league) =

Australian rugby league footballer

Personal information
- Born: 23 September 1967 (age 58)

Playing information
- Position: Prop, Second-row
Club
Years	Team	Pld	T	G	FG	P
1989–90	Cronulla	7	0	0	0	0
1991–93	Illawarra	47	4	0	0	0
1994–97	Western Suburbs	67	6	0	0	24
	Total	121	10	0	0	24
Representative
Years	Team	Pld	T	G	FG	P
1997	NSW Country	1	0	0	0	0

Bill Dunn (born 23 September 1967) is an Australian former professional rugby league footballer who played for Cronulla, Illawarra and the Western Suburbs.

== Biography ==
A forward, Dunn played his football mostly as a second-row or prop. He went to high school in Tweed Heads and was an Australian Schoolboys representative player in 1985.

Dunn made only seven first-grade appearances during his time at Cronulla but received more regular games when he switched to Illawarra for the 1991 season. In 1992 his 22 first-grade games for Illawarra including three finals, culminating in a four-point preliminary final loss to St. George. He finished his career at Western Suburbs, where he played for four years.

In 1997, his final season, he made a representative appearance for NSW Country.
