= Kelvin Skerrett =

Former GB & Wales international rugby league footballer

Personal information
- Full name: Kelvin Skerrett
- Born: 22 May 1966 (age 58); Methley, Leeds, West Riding of Yorkshire, England

Playing information
- Position: Prop, Second-row
Club
Years	Team	Pld	T	G	FG	P
1984–87	Hunslet	48	18	0	0	72
1987–90	Bradford Northern	92	18	0	0	72
1989	Western Suburbs	5	0	0	0	0
1990–96	Wigan	176	21	0	0	84
1997–99	Halifax	42	3	0	0	12
	Total	363	60	0	0	240
Representative
Years	Team	Pld	T	G	FG	P
1989–93	Great Britain	16	0	0	0	0
1995	Wales	5	0	0	0	0

Kelvin Skerrett (born 22 May 1966) is an English former professional rugby league footballer who played in the 1980s and 1990s, and coached in the 2000s. He played at representative level for Great Britain and Wales, and at club level for Hunslet, Bradford Northern, Western Suburbs Magpies, Wigan and the Halifax Blue Sox, as prop or second-row, and coached at club level for Oulton Raiders ARLFC, and Methley Royals ARLFC.

== Background ==
Skerrett was born in Middleton, Leeds, West Riding of Yorkshire, England.

== Playing career ==
=== Early career ===
Skerrett started his rugby league career with amateur club Oulton Raiders before turning professional in August 1984, joining Hunslet. He debuted for the club in September 1984 in a 10–32 defeat against Oldham. He went on to help Hunslet win the 1986–87 Second Division Championship.

Skerrett joined Bradford Northern from Hunslet in September 1987. He played second-row in Bradford Northern's 12–12 draw with Castleford in the 1987 Yorkshire Cup Final during the 1987–88 season at Headingley, Leeds on Saturday 17 October 1987, played second-row in the 11–2 victory over Castleford in the replay at Elland Road, Leeds on Saturday 31 October 1987, and played prop in the 20–14 victory over Featherstone Rovers in the 1989 Yorkshire Cup Final during the 1989–90 season at Headingley, Leeds on Sunday 5 November 1989.

While at Bradford, he had a brief spell in Australia during the 1989 NSWRL season, playing for Western Suburbs Magpies alongside fellow Englishmen Ellery Hanley and Garry Schofield.

=== Wigan ===
Skerrett signed for Wigan on a free transfer in July 1990, and made his debut a month later in the Charity Shield against Widnes. In September 1990, Skerrett was diagnosed with asthma after struggling with breathing difficulties during his first few games for the club. He helped the team win the 1990–91 League Championship, but missed out on the 1991 Challenge Cup final due to suspension.

During the 1991–92 Rugby Football League season, he played for defending champions Wigan as a prop in their 1991 World Club Challenge victory against the visiting Penrith Panthers. He also made his first Wembley appearance, playing in the 28–12 win against Castleford in the 1991–92 Challenge Cup final.

Skerrett also played at prop for defending RFL champions Wigan in the 1992 World Club Challenge against the visiting Brisbane Broncos.

Skerrett played left-prop in Wigan's 5–4 victory over St. Helens in the 1992 Lancashire Cup Final during the 1992–93 season at Knowsley Road, St. Helens on Sunday 18 October 1992. He scored Wigan's first try in the 1993 Challenge Cup final victory against Widnes, helping the team win its sixth consecutive Challenge Cup trophy.

Skerrett played left-prop in Wigan's 2–33 defeat by Castleford in the 1993–94 Regal Trophy Final during the 1993–94 season at Elland Road, Leeds on Saturday 22 January 1994, and played left-prop in the 40–10 victory over Warrington in the 1994–95 Regal Trophy Final during the 1994–95 season at Alfred McAlpine Stadium, Huddersfield on Saturday 28 January 1995.

He made his final appearance for Wigan in 1996, playing in the 44–14 win against St Helens at Old Trafford in the 1996 Premiership final. He played for Wigan from 1990 to 1996, a successful period for that team, making 176 appearances (including 21 substitute appearances) and scoring 21 tries, and was named among BBC sports commentator Ray French's best Wigan XIII. He left the club to join Halifax in 1997.

=== International career ===
Skerrett made his debut for Great Britain in 1989. He was chosen for the 1990 Lions tour, but missed the Test matches against Papua New Guinea due to an injury which required knee surgery. He returned for the New Zealand leg of the tour, and played in all three Tests against New Zealand, with Great Britain winning the series 2–1. Skerrett was also selected to go on the 1992 Great Britain Lions tour of Australia and New Zealand. During the 1992–93 Rugby Football League season he played from the bench in Great Britain's loss to Australia in the World Cup Final at Wembley.

Skerrett also represented Wales at the 1995 Rugby League World Cup. It was reported at the time that Skerrett qualified to play for Wales through the grandparent rule, but it was revealed many years later that this was incorrect and he should not have been eligible.

== Post playing ==
After his playing career ended, Skerrett coached at British Amateur Rugby League Association (BARLA) Oulton Raiders ARLFC. He was later appointed Head Coach of new amateur rugby league club Methley Royals in 2009, to stand in for Tony Handforth, who had suffered a stroke. Handforth later returned to take back his job.

== Honours ==
=== Club ===
Bradford Northern

- Yorkshire Cup (2): 1987–88, 1989–90

Wigan

- Championship (6): 1990–91, 1991–92, 1992–93, 1993–94, 1994–95, 1995–96
- Challenge Cup (4):1991–92, 1992–93, 1993–94, 1994–95
- World Club Challenge (1): 1991
- Lancashire Cup (1): 1992–93
- Premiership (3): 1993–94, 1994–95, 1996
- Regal Trophy (1): 1994–95
