= Steve Crowe (rugby league) =

Australian rugby league footballer

Stephen Crowe
Personal information
- Full name: Stephen Crowe
- Born: 20 April 1969 (age 55); Young, New South Wales, Australia

Playing information
- Height: 1.85 m (6 ft 1 in)
- Weight: 93 kg (14 st 9 lb)
- Position: Prop, Second-row
Club
Years	Team	Pld	T	G	FG	P
1991–98	Newcastle Knights	51	1	0	0	4

Stephen "Steve" Crowe (born 20 April 1969) is an Australian former rugby league footballer who played in the 1990s. Crowe played for the Newcastle Knights in the National Rugby League.

== Background ==
Crowe was born in Young, New South Wales.

== Playing career ==
Crowe played his entire career at the Knights. He played in the Knight's first premiership winning team in 1997, a game which has been described as one of the best grand finals on record. His career ended prematurely after a series of serious injuries, including a broken sternum in his final year (1998).

== Post playing ==
After his playing career finished, he went on to enjoy an off-field career with the club in a number of marketing and management roles. He is a republican, having been a member of the Australian Republican Movement's (ARM) NSW Committee in the lead-up to the 1999 republican referendum. He also led the Hunter Region branch of the ARM during that period.
