= Shane Mackley =

Australian rugby league footballer

Personal information
- Full name: Shane Mackley

Playing information
- Position: Wing, Centre
Club
Years	Team	Pld	T	G	FG	P
1992	Newcastle Knights	4	1	0	0	4
- Source: As of 14 Jul 2021

Shane Mackley is an Australian former professional rugby league footballer who played in the 1990s. He played for the Newcastle Knights in 1992.
