= Max Chapman (rugby league) =

Australian rugby league footballer

Personal information
- Full name: Max Chapman

Playing information
- Position: Hooker
Club
Years	Team	Pld	T	G	FG	P
1990–93	Newcastle Knights	17	1	0	0	4
- Source: As of 6 February 2019

Max Chapman is an Australian former professional rugby league footballer who played in the 1990s. He played for the Newcastle Knights from 1990 to 1991 and 1993.
