= 1988 Rugby League World Cup final =

New Zealand	Australia
(NZRL)	(ARL)
12	25
	1	2	Total
NZL	0	12	12
AUS	21	4	25
- Date: 9 October 1988
- Stadium: Eden Park
- Location: Auckland, New Zealand
- Man of the Match: Gavin Miller
- Referee: Graham Ainui (Papua New Guinea)
- Attendance: 47,363

Broadcast partners
- Broadcasters: TVNZ (New Zealand) Nine Network (Australia)
- Commentators: Tony Palmer (TVNZ); Gary Kemble (TVNZ); Darrell Eastlake (Nine); Ray Warren (Nine); Jack Gibson (Nine) Michael Cronin (Nine)

The 1988 Rugby League World Cup final was the conclusive game of the 1985–1988 Rugby League World Cup tournament and was played between New Zealand and Australia on 9 October 1988 at Eden Park in Auckland, New Zealand. Australia won the final by 25 points to 12 in front of a New Zealand rugby league record attendance of 47,363. Australia, the defending champions, won the Rugby League World Cup for the 6th time.

== Background ==
Team	Played	Won	Drew	Lost	For	Against	Difference	Points
Australia	8	6	0	2	252	91	+161	12^{1}
New Zealand	8	5	1	2	158	86	+72	11^{1}
Great Britain	8	4	2	2	203	90	+113	10
Papua New Guinea	8	2	0	6	84	325	−241	4^{1}
France	8	1	1	6	35	140	−105	3

^{1} France's 1987 away fixtures against Australia, New Zealand and Papua New Guinea were scratched and each team awarded two points as the French were unable to tour Australasia that year due to financial difficulties.

=== New Zealand ===
The Tony Gordon coached New Zealand started their World Cup campaign on 7 July 1985 (under the coaching of Graham Lowe) when they defeated Australia 18–0 at Carlaw Park in Auckland. Until the Final, The Kiwis won another 3 games while losing 2 and drawing 1 for a 4-2-1 record.

==== Results ====
Opposing Team	For	Against	Date	Venue	Attendance	Stage
Australia	18	0	7 July 1985	Carlaw Park, Auckland	15,327	Group Stage
Great Britain	6	6	9 November 1985	Headingley, Leeds	22,209	Group Stage
France	22	0	7 December 1985	Stade Gilbert Brutus, Perpignan	5,000	Group Stage
Australia	12	32	29 July 1986	Lang Park, Brisbane	22,811	Group Stage
Papua New Guinea	22	24	22 May 1988	Lloyd Robson Oval, Port Moresby	15,000	Group Stage
Papua New Guinea	66	14	10 July 1988	Carlaw Park, Auckland	8,392	Group Stage
Great Britain	12	10	17 July 1988	Rugby League Park, Christchurch	8,525	Group Stage

=== Australia ===
Australia began their World Cup campaign with a shock 18-0 loss to New Zealand in the third test of the 1985 Trans-Tasman series in Auckland on 7 July 1985 (under the coaching of 1977 World Cup final winning coach Terry Fearnley). The Don Furner coached Kangaroos would win another 5 games while losing 1 for a 5-2 record.

==== Results ====
Opposing Team	For	Against	Date	Venue	Attendance	Stage
New Zealand	0	18	7 July 1985	Carlaw Park, Auckland	15,327	Group Stage
New Zealand	12	32	29 July 1986	Lang Park, Brisbane	22,811	Group Stage
Papua New Guinea	62	12	4 October 1986	Lloyd Robson Oval, Port Moresby	17,000	Group Stage
Great Britain	24	15	22 November 1986	Central Park, Wigan	20,169	Group Stage
France	52	0	13 December 1986	Stade d'Albert Domec, Carcassonne	5,000	Group Stage
Great Britain	12	26	9 July 1988	Sydney Football Stadium, Sydney	15,944	Group Stage
Papua New Guinea	70	8	20 July 1988	Eric Weissel Oval, Wagga Wagga	11,685	Group Stage

=== Head to Head ===
This would be the first time that New Zealand and Australia would meet in a World Cup final.

== Host venue ==
Australia won the right to host the World Cup final. However, in the interests of rugby league, and with international attendances in Australia on the decline since the domination of the Kangaroos had begun a decade earlier, the Australian Rugby League (ARL) agreed to allow the New Zealand Rugby League (NZRL) to host the Final. Additionally, the Australian venues that would have been used, the 40,000 capacity Sydney Football Stadium (SFS) and the 32,500 capacity Lang Park in Brisbane were both smaller than the ultimate choice of Eden Park, while the 50,000 capacity Sydney Cricket Ground which had hosted the 1968 and 1977 World Cup finals was not considered as the ARL had moved its playing headquarters to the new Football Stadium in 1988.

At the time the largest rugby league venue in New Zealand was the 20,000 capacity Carlaw Park in Auckland. New Zealand's largest stadium, the 48,000 capacity Eden Park stadium in Auckland, the spiritual home of rugby union in New Zealand was chosen as the host venue. Eden Park had also hosted the 1987 Rugby World Cup final (attracting 48,035) giving it the distinction of being the only venue to host both the Rugby League and Rugby Union World Cup finals.

This would be the first rugby league match to be played at Eden Park since 1919. As of 2023 the attendance of 47,363 remains the record crowd for a rugby league match at the venue and the record attendance for a rugby league match in New Zealand, easily beating the recorded 28,000 attendance from 4 August 1928 when New Zealand had defeated England at Carlaw Park.

== Match details ==
9 October 1988
14:30

New Zealand	12–25	Australia
Tries: Kevin Iro; Tony Iro Goals: Peter Brown (2/5)		Tries: Allan Langer (2); Gavin Miller; Dale Shearer; Goals: Michael O'Connor (4/7); Field Goal: Benny Elias

Eden Park, Auckland
Attendance: 47,363
Referee: Graham Ainui (Papua New Guinea)
Touch Judges: Dennis Hale (New Zealand) , Bill Shrimpton (New Zealand)
Player of the Match: Gavin Miller

New Zealand	Australia

FB	1	Gary Mercer
RW	2	Tony Iro
RC	3	Kevin Iro
LC	4	Dean Bell (c)
LW	5	Mark Elia
FE	6	Gary Freeman
HB	7	Clayton Friend
PR	8	Peter Brown
HK	9	Wayne Wallace
PR	10	Adrian Shelford
SR	11	Mark Graham
SR	12	Kurt Sorensen
LF	13	Mark Horo
Substitutions:
IC	14	Shane Cooper
IC	15	Sam Stewart
Coach:
(New Zealand) Tony Gordon

FB	1	Garry Jack
RW	2	Dale Shearer
RC	3	Andrew Farrar
LC	4	Mark McGaw
LW	5	Michael O'Connor
FE	6	Wally Lewis (c)
HB	7	Allan Langer
PR	8	Paul Dunn
HK	9	Benny Elias
PR	10	Steve Roach
SR	11	Paul Sironen
SR	12	Gavin Miller
LF	13	Wayne Pearce
Substitutions:
IC	14	David Gillespie
IC	15	Terry Lamb
Coach:
(Australia) Don Furner

Despite Australia's successful Ashes defence against Great Britain earlier in the year, the inexperience of the Australian World Cup final team (and because NZ had defeated Australia in their previous encounter in a one-off test in Brisbane in 1987), saw the hosts actually go into the match as favourites in the eyes of many critics. However, the Wally Lewis led Kangaroos, boasting veteran test players Garry Jack, Dale Shearer, Michael O'Connor (a dual rugby international and the only member of the team to have previously played at Eden Park), Steve Roach, Paul Dunn, Wayne Pearce, and Terry Lamb, along with 1986 Kangaroos Benny Elias and Paul Sironen, mixed with newer international players Mark McGaw, Allan Langer, Gavin Miller, Andrew Farrar and David Gillespie, triumphed over the ill-disciplined Kiwis, who at least made sure the victorious Australians were bloodied and bruised for their victory lap. For the Kiwis, the Iro brothers Tony and Kevin, Gary Freeman, Clayton Friend, Mark Graham, Adrian Shelford, Kurt Sorensen and captain Dean Bell dished out the punishment.

Other than the ill-discipline, some of the Kiwis had a game to forget. Gary Mercer at fullback missed first half tackles on Langer and Man of the Match Gavin Miller that led directly to each crossing for a try, while Langer simply stood him up and left him grasping at air to score his second of the first half, while Dean Bell dropped two balls in the first 20 minutes of the game (the second after a good break down the left flank by Freeman) that each time led to Australia scoring soon after.

Despite the pre-game predictions, the Aussie's led 21–0 at half time and scored soon after the resumption of play as Dale Shearer stood up Wayne Wallace and strode over in the corner. O'Connor missed the conversion, and a further two penalty kicks and Australia's score remained at 25. From there the Kiwis mounted a mini comeback with the Iro brothers crossing for tries, but the Australian's had the game well in hand to claim their 6th World Cup crown and 3rd in succession after also winning the 1975 and 1977 tournaments.

Despite Queensland having won the 1988 State of Origin series 3–0 over New South Wales earlier in the year and supplying the bulk of the players in The Ashes win over Great Britain, the Maroons only supplied three of Australia's 15 players for the World Cup final - captain Wally Lewis, Dale Shearer and Allan Langer. Lewis broke his right forearm in the 15th minute of the game while tackling Tony Iro, the Kiwi winger had tried to duck under Lewis' tackle and Wally's right forearm came into contact with Iro's head. With his arm hanging limp affecting his passing (including a pass from dummy half that literally just fell to the ground), Lewis bravely played on for another 25 minutes with the Kiwis targeting him in defence before Terry Lamb came on to replace him while. In attack while still on the field, Lewis actually moved out to the wing while Dale Shearer moved infield to play 5/8, during which time he showed his own talent by setting up Langer's second try. Queenslanders missing from Australia's record 70–8 win over Papua New Guinea just over 2 months earlier were Mal Meninga (broken arm), Peter Jackson, Tony Currie, Greg Conescu, Wally Fullerton Smith and reserve forward Paul Vautin. Lewis later publicly claimed that it was the same as had been the case since State of Origin had started in 1980, Qld wins the series but it was mainly NSW players picked for Australia. The Australian team included nine players who had played in the 1988 NSWRL Grand Final a month earlier (4 from premiers Canterbury-Bankstown and 5 from runners up Balmain), plus a further four players who had played in the Finals series. Only Wally Lewis and Allan Langer had not played during the NSWRL Finals.

After taking over the Kangaroos coaching role in 1986 and compiling a 13–2 win–loss record, this would be Don Furner's last game as coach of the Australian team as he was retiring from coaching. From 1989 the Australian coach would be former test captain and Manly-Warringah's 1987 premiership winning coach Bob Fulton. Don Furner would stay involved with the national team, becoming the Chairman of Selectors for the Australian Rugby League.

== Broadcast ==
The match was broadcast into Australia by the Nine Network with commentary from Darrell Eastlake, Ray Warren and special comments from five time Sydney premiership winning "Supercoach" Jack Gibson with Michael Cronin, Australia's then record test point scorer and a World Cup winner in 1975 and 1977, the sideline reporter.

Locally the game was televised by Television New Zealand with commentary provided by Tony Palmer and former Kiwis fullback, 19 test veteran Gary Kemble.
