= 1988 State of Origin series =

Australian rugby league series

- Won by: Queensland (5th series title)
- Series margin: 3-0
- Points scored: 126
- Attendance: 75,168 (ave. 25,056 per match)
- Top points scorer(s): Gary Belcher (28 points)
- Top try scorer(s): Allan Langer (4 tries)

The 1988 State of Origin series was the seventh annual three-game series between the New South Wales and Queensland representative rugby league football teams to be contested entirely under 'state of origin' selection rules. Queensland enjoyed their first ever 3–0 series whitewash, mirroring a feat New South Wales had first achieved two years earlier. The series produced an ugly and enduring Origin image when in Game II the parochial Queensland crowd showered the Lang Park playing arena with beer cans in protest at the sin-binning of their captain Wally Lewis.

New South Wales had a new home for Origin football in 1988. The AU$68 million, 40,000 capacity all-seat Sydney Football Stadium, a rectangular stadium more suited to rugby league than the round Sydney Cricket Ground, had been built in 1987 and opened in time for the 1988 NSWRL season. The SFS was described in its early days as a white elephant and lacking in the character and history of its predecessor, the SCG. Queensland players described playing at the SFS in 1988 as like playing on neutral ground.

== Game I ==
Coming into the 1988 opener, Queensland had not yet experienced an Origin match without Wally Lewis. Supporters were stunned when he was ruled out of game I with a shoulder injury. He had captained the Maroons on 20 occasions (out of 21 appearances) and won eight man-of-the-match awards, establishing himself as an Origin great. The selectors' answer to his absence was Peter Jackson the Canberra Raiders' resident comic who prided himself on wisecracks and high jinks. However Jackson had honed his organisational and kicking skills at Canberra and was ready to fill Lewis' role. Captaining the Maroons for the first time was Manly-Warringah's 1987 Premiership winning captain Paul Vautin.

After 42,048 fans had attended the only Origin game in Sydney at the SCG in 1987, the Sydney fans voted with their feet at the new SFS when only 26,441 attended Game 1. The low crowd number was largely due to the NSWRL charging $34 per seat as pointed out by Channel 9 match commentator Darrell Eastlake. His fellow Ch.9 commentator, Supercoach Jack Gibson replied to his comments that with an hours wait fans could watch the game at home on television for free rather than pay the high ticket price.

Tuesday, May 17, 1988

Queensland	26–18	New South Wales
(10 - 1 t, 2 g) Gary Belcher (4 - 1 t) Peter Jackson (4 - 1 t) Alan McIndoe (8 - 2 t) Allan Langer	(Report)	Michael O'Connor (10 - 1 t, 3 g); Andrew Ettingshausen (4 - 1 t); Mark McGaw (4 - 1 t)

Sydney Football Stadium
Attendance: 26,441
Referee: Barry Gomersall
Player of the Match: Allan Langer

With Queensland missing their captain and the world's best footballer Wally Lewis, New South Wales had expected to dominate in the encounter but were flat from the outset. In the first-ever Origin game held at the newly built Sydney Football Stadium and in front of a less than capacity crowd (the seats at the in-goal ends of the stadium were virtually empty), the Maroons seized upon what Vautin termed the "neutral atmosphere".

New five-eighth Jackson played well and fullback Gary Belcher provided support with general play kicking while pint-sized Allan Langer provided the attacking thrust. Jackson was a natural tackler and together with Paul Vautin led with words of inspiration. For the Blues, both Peter Sterling and Cliff Lyons tried hard but unlike Langer and Jackson had very little support from the Blues forwards.

Langer scampered across the line twice to give Queensland a 12-6 lead at half-time and after the break the procession of Queensland tries continued. Jackson, Belcher and Origin debutant Alan McIndoe all scored (despite television replays showing that McIndoe didn't ground the ball and had actually knocked-on) to give the Maroons an unassailable 26-6 lead before two late tries to Andrew Ettingshausen and Mark McGaw earned New South Wales some respectability on the scoreboard. Arguably the best of the Blues on the night was their longest serving outside back, dual-international Michael O'Connor who looked dangerous whenever he touched the ball, while Ettingshausen got through a mountain of work trying to get NSW out from being pinned deep in their own half.

== Game II ==
Tuesday, May 31, 1988

Queensland	16–6	New South Wales
(4 - 1 t) Sam Backo (4 - 1 t) Allan Langer (8 - 4 g) Gary Belcher	(Report)	Michael O'Connor (6 - 1t, 1 g)

Lang Park, Brisbane
Attendance: 31,817
Referee: Mick Stone
Player of the Match: Sam Backo

New South Wales played with passion, looked the better side in game II and were leading 6-4 with 18 minutes to go. Then Wally Lewis was sentenced to 5 minutes in the sin-bin by referee Mick Stone for dissent after a scuffle between Phil Daley and Greg Conescu developed into an all-in brawl. The parochial Queensland crowd was outraged and with their hero Lewis in the sheds the ground was showered with beer cans amid chants of "send Stone off".

After order was restored the complexion of the game changed. The Blues were visibly rattled and a minute after play resumed big Maroon prop Sam Backo crashed over to give Queensland a 10-6 lead. When Allan Langer later clinched the game at 16-6 and the series by taking an inside pass from Conescu to score, Lewis by now back from his exile, carried Langer back from the Blues' tryline in jubilation.

== Game III ==
Tuesday, June 21, 1988

Queensland	38–22	New South Wales
(10 - 5 g) Gary Belcher (4 - 1 t) Peter Jackson (4 - 1 t) Joe Kilroy (4 - 1 t) Wally Lewis (4 - 1 t) Allan Langer (8 - 2 t) Sam Backo (4 - 1 t) Brett French	(Report)	John Ferguson (4 - 1 t); Wayne Pearce (4 - 1 t); Steve Hanson (4 - 1 t); Michael O'Connor (10 - 1 t, 3 g)

Sydney Football Stadium
Attendance: 16,910
Referee: Greg McCallum
Player of the Match: Sam Backo

Game III of 1988 was barely a contest and the feeble Sydney crowd of 16,910 reflected as much. With the series already decided, both teams opened up in a game of entertaining, free-flowing football. Queensland were unstoppable and Sam Backo grabbed a try double as the Maroons raced in seven tries to whip the Blues 38–22. Queensland had swept New South Wales 3–0 in their maiden whitewash.

== Teams ==
=== New South Wales ===
Position	Game 1	Game 2	Game 3
Fullback	Jonathan Docking	Garry Jack	
Wing	Brian Johnston	John Ferguson	
Centre	Mark McGaw		
Centre	Michael O'Connor		
Wing	Andrew Ettingshausen		
Five-Eighth	Cliff Lyons	Terry Lamb	Cliff Lyons
Halfback	Peter Sterling		Des Hasler
Prop	Les Davidson	Phil Daley	Steve Hanson
Hooker	Royce Simmons	Ben Elias	
Prop	Steve Roach		
Second Row	Noel Cleal	Wayne Pearce (c)	
Second Row	Steve Folkes		
Lock	Wayne Pearce (c)	Paul Langmack	
Replacement	Terry Lamb	Des Hasler	Greg Florimo
Replacement	David Trewhella	Paul Dunn	Noel Cleal
Coach	John Peard		

=== Queensland ===
Position	Game 1	Game 2	Game 3
Fullback	Gary Belcher		
Wing	Alan McIndoe		
Centre	Gene Miles	Peter Jackson	
Centre	Tony Currie	Gene Miles	Tony Currie
Wing	Joe Kilroy	Tony Currie	Joe Kilroy
Five-Eighth	Peter Jackson	Wally Lewis (c)	
Halfback	Allan Langer		
Prop	Sam Backo		
Hooker	Greg Conescu		
Prop	Martin Bella		
Second Row	Wally Fullerton-Smith		
Second Row	Bob Lindner		
Lock	Paul Vautin (c)	Paul Vautin	
Replacement	Brett French		
Replacement	Scott Tronc	Trevor Gillmeister	
Coach	Wayne Bennett		

== Aftermath ==
Following Queensland's first ever 3-0 Origin series whitewash, a record 9 Maroons were chosen for the first Ashes series test against the touring Great Britain Lions with the only Blues selected being fullback Garry Jack, winger Andrew Ettingshausen, centre Michael O'Connor, halfback Peter Sterling, front rower Phil Daley, the only NSW player in an almost all Queensland forward pack, and reserve forward Steve Folkes.

== Footnotes ==
- Big League's 25 Years of Origin Collectors' Edition, News Magazines, Surry Hills, Sydney
