= 1986 Kangaroo tour of Great Britain and France =

1986 rugby league tour

1986 Kangaroos tour
- Date: 12 October 1986 – 13 December 1986
- Manager: Gordon Treichel, John Fleming
- Coach(es): Don Furner
- Tour captain(s): Wally Lewis
- Top point scorer(s): Michael O'Connor (170)
- Top try scorer(s): Terry Lamb (19)
Summary
P	W	D	L
Total
20	20	0	0
Test match
5	5	0	0
Opponent
P	W	D	L
Great Britain
3	3	0	0
France
2	2	0	0

Tour chronology
- Previous tour: 1982
- Next tour: 1990

The 1986 Kangaroo tour of Great Britain and France was the sixteenth Kangaroo tour in which the Australian national rugby league team (known as the Winfield Kangaroos due to sponsorship) plays a number of tour matches against British and French teams, in addition to the Test matches. The next Kangaroo tour was staged in 1990.

Australia continued its dominance, easily winning both Test series against Great Britain and France as well as defeating Papua New Guinea in Port Moresby on the way to England, going through the entire tour undefeated in a repeat of the 1982 Invincibles' tour which saw the 1986 team became known as "The Unbeatables". In twenty matches they scored 136 tries and conceded only 16, posting 738 points for and 126 against. Terry Lamb became the first player to appear in every match on a Kangaroo Tour.

The team was coached by 1956/57 Kangaroo tourist Don Furner, who also coached the Canberra Raiders in the NSWRL that year. The squad was captained by Queensland captain Wally Lewis, the first time a Queensland based player had captained a Kangaroo tour since Tom Gorman led the 1929–30 Kangaroo tour of Great Britain. Peter Sterling was named as the tour's vice-captain, while the tour managers were Gordon Treichel and John Fleming.

National Panasonic put up AU$5,000 worth of products for the Australian player who voted as player of the tour. Team sponsor Winfield also put up $1,000 for the Australian player judged the player of the match for each Test match played on the tour.

== Squad ==
Of the 28 players selected to go on the tour 23 were from clubs of the New South Wales Rugby League and 5 were from clubs of the Brisbane Rugby League. This was the last time players from the Queensland-based competition were selected for a Kangaroo tour.

There were a couple of notable omissions from the touring team. Parramatta Eels test winger Eric Grothe had originally been selected in the side and even had pre-tour publicity photos taken with the rest of the team. However he was ruled out late with the recurrence of a knee injury and his place was taken by young Penrith halfback Greg Alexander. The other was regular Australian vice-captain Wayne Pearce who had ruptured his Anterior cruciate ligament during the 1986 Trans-Tasman Test series against New Zealand in July. Despite an intense rehabilitation program, and being passed as fit by his surgeon, Dr Merv Cross, Pearce was ruled out of the tour by team medico Dr Bill Monoghan after a pre-tour team physical conducted at Redfern Oval in Sydney.

Surprisingly, the 1986 NSWRL Winfield Cup premiers Parramatta only supplied two players to the Kangaroos squad (vice-captain Peter Sterling and Brett Kenny). Conversely, the 1986 Brisbane premiers Wynnum-Manly supplied four players to the squad (captain Wally Lewis, Greg Dowling, Bob Lindner and Gene Miles). With the exception of Dowling who did not play the pre-tour test against Papua New Guinea, all six 1986 premiership winners played in each test on the tour.

NOTE: Statistics only show games in Great Britain and France and do not include the test against Papua New Guinea. Sub total is included in full games total

Player	Club	Position(s)	Games (sub)	Tests (sub)	Tries	Goals	Points
(New South Wales) Greg Alexander	Penrith Panthers	Halfback, Wing	9 (1)	-	10	5	50
(Queensland) Gary Belcher	Canberra Raiders	Fullback	10	-	6	0	24
(Queensland) Martin Bella	North Sydney Bears	Prop	8 (2)	-	1	0	4
(New South Wales) Noel Cleal	Manly-Warringah Sea Eagles	Second-row, Wing	7	2	3	0	12
(New South Wales) Phil Daley	Manly-Warringah Sea Eagles	Prop	7	-	0	0	0
(New South Wales) Les Davidson	South Sydney Rabbitohs	Second-row, Prop	14	3 (2)	0	0	0
(Queensland) Greg Dowling	Wynnum-Manly Seagulls (Qld)	Prop	11	5	1	0	4
(New South Wales) Paul Dunn	Canterbury-Bankstown Bulldogs	Second-row, Prop	11	4	0	0	0
(New South Wales) Ben Elias	Balmain Tigers	Hooker	10	-	3	0	12
(New South Wales) Steve Folkes	Canterbury-Bankstown Bulldogs	Second-row	6	1	1	0	4
(New South Wales) Des Hasler	Manly-Warringah Sea Eagles	Halfback	8	-	4	0	16
(New South Wales) Garry Jack	Balmain Tigers	Fullback	12	5	12	0	48
(New South Wales) Brett Kenny	Parramatta Eels	Centre, Wing	14	5	8	0	32
(Queensland) Les Kiss	North Sydney Bears	Wing	4	1	1	0	4
(New South Wales) Terry Lamb	Canterbury-Bankstown Bulldogs	Five-eighth	20	5 (5)	19	20	116
(New South Wales) Paul Langmack	Canterbury-Bankstown Bulldogs	Lock	10	-	3	0	12
(Queensland) Wally Lewis (c)	Wynnum-Manly Seagulls (Qld)	Five-eighth	11	5	6	0	24
(Queensland) Bob Lindner	Wynnum-Manly Seagulls (Qld)	Lock	10	5	6	0	24
(Queensland) Mal Meninga	Canberra Raiders	Centre, Wing, Second-row	13	3 (2)	9	7	50
(Queensland) Gene Miles	Wynnum-Manly Seagulls (Qld)	Centre	13	5	8	0	32
(New South Wales) Chris Mortimer	Canterbury-Bankstown Bulldogs	Wing, Centre	9	-	4	0	32
(Queensland) Bryan Niebling	Redcliffe Dolphins (Qld)	Prop, Second-row	10	5	2	0	8
(New South Wales) Michael O'Connor	St George Dragons	Wing	14	5	13	59	170
(New South Wales) Steve Roach	Balmain Tigers	Prop	8	1	3	0	12
(Queensland) Dale Shearer	Manly-Warringah Sea Eagles	Wing	13	4	12	0	48
(New South Wales) Royce Simmons	Penrith Panthers	Hooker	10	5	1	0	4
(New South Wales) Paul Sironen	Balmain Tigers	Second-row	10	1	0	0	0
(New South Wales) Peter Sterling (vc)	Parramatta Eels	Halfback	10	5	3	0	12

== By Club ==
The touring side was represented by 18 New South Welshmen (N) and 10 Queenslanders (Q).

- Canterbury-Bankstown Bulldogs (5): Paul Dunn (N), Steve Folkes (N), Terry Lamb (N), Paul Langmack (N), Chris Mortimer (N)
- Balmain Tigers (4): Ben Elias (N), Garry Jack (N), Steve Roach (N), Paul Sironen (N)
- Manly-Warringah Sea Eagles (4): Noel Cleal (N), Phil Daley (N), Des Halser (N), Dale Shearer (Q)
- Wynnum-Manly Seagulls (4): Wally Lewis (captain) (Q), Greg Dowling (Q), Bob Lindner (Q), Gene Miles (Q)
- Canberra Raiders (2): Gary Belcher (Q), Mal Meninga (Q)
- North Sydney Bears (2): Martin Bella (Q), Les Kiss (Q)
- Parramatta Eels (2): Peter Sterling (N) (vice-captain), Brett Kenny (N)
- Penrith Panthers (2): Greg Alexander (N), Royce Simmons (N)
- Redcliffe Dolphins (1): Bryan Niebling (Q)
- South Sydney Rabbitohs (1): Les Davidson (N)
- St George Dragons (1): Michael O'Connor (N)

== Papua New Guinea ==
Before flying to England, the Kangaroos played their second ever Test against Papua New Guinea at the Lloyd Robson Oval in Port Moresby on 4 October. In front of 17,000 fans (still the record attendance for the venue as of 2024), the Wally Lewis led Kangaroos defeated the Kumuls 62–12. Canterbury-Bankstown forward Paul Dunn made his test debut in the 2nd row while easily the biggest player on tour, 195 cm (6 ft 5 in), 115 kg (18 st 2 lb) Balmain back rower Paul Sironen made his test debut off the bench. This was the first of three test matches on the tour that counted towards the ongoing 1985-1988 Rugby League World Cup

4 October 1986

Papua New Guinea	12 – 62	Australia
Tries: Bal Numapo (2) Goals: Dairi Kovae (2/2)		Tries: Noel Cleal (2); Les Kiss (2); Michael O'Connor (2); Garry Jack; Des Hasler; Wally Lewis; Bob Lindner; Chris Mortimer; Steve Roach; Goals: Michael O'Connor (7/12)

Lloyd Robson Oval, Port Moresby
Attendance: 17,000
Referee: Neville Kesha (Papua New Guinea)

Papua New Guinea	Australia

FB	1	Dairi Kovae
RW	2	Joe Katsir
RC	3	Lauta Atoi
LC	4	Bal Numapo
LW	5	Mafu Kerekere
FE	6	Daruis Haili
HB	7	Tony Kila (c)
PR	8	Joe Tep
HK	9	Roy Heni
PR	10	Ati Lomutopa
SR	11	Bobby Ako
SR	12	Bernard Waketsi
LK	13	Arebo Taumaku
Substitutions:
IC	14	Kepi Saea
IC	15	Noah Andy
Coach:
(New Zealand) Barry Wilson

FB	1	Garry Jack
LW	2	Michael O'Connor
RC	3	Gene Miles
LC	4	Chris Mortimer
RW	5	Les Kiss
FE	6	Wally Lewis (c)
HB	7	Des Hasler
PR	8	Steve Roach
HK	9	Royce Simmons
PR	10	Bryan Niebling
SR	11	Paul Dunn
SR	12	Noel Cleal
LF	13	Bob Lindner
Substitutions:
IC	14	Mal Meninga
IC	15	Paul Sironen
Coach:
(Australia) Don Furner

== Great Britain ==
The Kangaroos played 13 games in England, including the three Ashes tests against Great Britain. Australia kept alive its streak of not having lost to an English club or provincial team since 1978. The English leg of the tour drew a total of 212,068 fans to the 13 games (including the three tests). However Challenge Cup winners Castleford and Premiership winners Warrington despite their trophy successes never got games against the Kangaroos (both would be back on the Kangaroos itinerary in 1990 and 1994) while the Lancashire Cup and John Player Special Trophy winners Wigan, the Yorkshire Cup winners Hull Kingston Rovers, and League Champions Halifax, all got games against the touring Australians.

=== Test Venues ===
The three Ashes series tests took place at the following venues.

Manchester	Leeds	Wigan
Old Trafford	Elland Road	Central Park
Capacity: 51,000	Capacity: 32,500	Capacity: 37,000

Sunday, 12 October

Wigan	18 – 26	Australia
Tries: Dean Bell, Shaun Edwards, Joe Lydon; Goals: Henderson Gill (3/4)		Tries: Michael O'Connor, Peter Sterling, Noel Cleal, Wally Lewis, Les Kiss; Goals: Michael O'Connor (3/5)

Central Park, Wigan
Attendance: 30,622
Referee: John Holdsworth
Player of the Match: Bryan Niebling

Wigan	Australia

FB	1	Steve Hampson
RW	2	Dean Bell
CE	3	David Stephenson
CE	4	Joe Lydon
LW	5	Henderson Gill
SO	6	Shaun Edwards
SH	7	Mike Ford
PR	8	Graeme West (c)
HK	9	Martin Dermott
PR	10	Brian Case
SR	11	Ian Roberts
SR	12	Ian Potter
LF	13	Andy Goodway
Substitutions:
IC	14	Nick Du Toit
IC	15	Rob Louw
Coach:
(New Zealand) Graham Lowe

FB	1	Garry Jack
LW	2	Michael O'Connor
CE	3	Gene Miles
CE	4	Brett Kenny
RW	5	Les Kiss
FE	6	Wally Lewis (c)
HB	7	Peter Sterling
PR	8	Steve Roach
HK	9	Royce Simmons
PR	10	Bryan Niebling
SR	11	Paul Sironen
SR	12	Noel Cleal
LK	13	Bob Lindner
Substitutions:
IC	14	Terry Lamb
IC	15	Les Davidson
Coach:
(Australia) Don Furner

The Kangaroos led 16–2 at half time in front of 30,622 fans (the record for a Wigan vs Australia match on a Kangaroo Tour) in the tour opener at Wigan (10,000 more than would attend the dead rubber 3rd test at the same ground some 6 weeks later). A fightback in the second half by the home side saw them close the game to just 8 points at full time.

The attendance at this game (30,622) was the largest crowd the Kangaroos had played in front of in England since 30,604 attended the 3rd Ashes Test at Headingley on the 1978 Kangaroo tour. It was also the highest ever tour game attendance against Wigan beating the 28,554 who attended the match at Central Park between Wigan and the 1948–49 Kangaroos captained by Clive Churchill.

Wednesday, 15 October

Hull Kingston Rovers	10 – 46	Australia
Tries: Kerry Boustead; Goals: John Dorahy (3/3)		Tries: Terry Lamb (5), Ben Elias (2), Paul Langmack, Chris Mortimer; Goals: Terry Lamb (3/3); Mal Meninga (2/4)

Craven Park, Hull
Attendance: 6,868
Referee: Gerry Kershaw
Player of the Match: Terry Lamb

Hull KR	Australia

FB	1	George Fairbairn (c)
RW	2	Garry Clark
CE	3	John Dorahy
CE	4	Kerry Boustead
LW	5	David Laws
SO	6	Mike Smith
SH	7	Wayne Parker
PR	8	Mark Broadhurst
HK	9	Chris Rudd
PR	10	Asuquo Ema
SR	11	Andy Kelly
SR	12	Des Harrison
LF	13	Paul Speckman
Substitutions:
IC	14	Ray Stead
IC	15	Dave Busby
Coach:
(England) Roger Millward

FB	1	Gary Belcher
LW	2	Chris Mortimer
CE	3	Gene Miles
CE	4	Mal Meninga
RW	5	Dale Shearer
FE	6	Terry Lamb
HB	7	Des Hasler
PR	8	Greg Dowling
HK	9	Benny Elias (c)
PR	10	Martin Bella
SR	11	Steve Folkes
SR	12	Paul Dunn
LK	13	Paul Langmack
Substitutions:
IC	14	Greg Alexander
IC	15	Les Davidson
Coach:
(Australia) Don Furner

All of Hull KR's points were scored by Australian's. Former Wests, Manly and Illawarra back John Dorahy kicked 3 goals for the Robins while 1978 and 1982 Kangaroo tourist and 25 test veteran Kerry Boustead scored the only try for the home team with all 10 points coming in the first half. For the Kangaroos, Terry Lamb crossed for 5 of the teams 9 tries. Australian halfback Des Hasler broke his hand in the first half and was replaced by Greg Alexander. Hasler's injury would keep him out of action for a month and he would not return to the field until the 11th game of the tour against Hull F.C. at The Boulevard.

For the match at Craven Park, Kangaroo tour broadcaster Network Ten had to hire extra lighting to bring the lights up to broadcasting standard. It would become a common theme and problem during tour games for Ten with all bar the Ashes tests and the games against Wigan, Leeds and Hull F.C. being played at night at grounds where the lighting was usually not up to broadcast standard.

Sunday, 19 October

Leeds	0 – 40	Australia
Tries: Goals: David Creasser (0/1)		Tries: Michael O'Connor (2), Wally Lewis (2), Garry Jack, Noel Cleal, Greg Dowling, Brett Kenny; Goals: Michael O'Connor (4/8)

Headingley, Leeds
Attendance: 11,389
Referee: Robin Whitfield

Leeds	Australia

FB	1	Paul Gill
RW	2	David Creasser
CE	3	Andrew Ettingshausen
CE	4	Mark McGaw
LW	5	Norman Francis
SO	6	John Holmes
SH	7	Andy Gascoigne
PR	8	Jeff Grayshon
HK	9	Bob Morris
PR	10	Peter Smith
SR	11	Phil Owen
SR	12	Gary Price
LF	13	David Heron (c)
Substitutions:
IC	14	Paul Medley
IC	15	Trevor Skerrett
Coach:
(England) Peter Fox

FB	1	Garry Jack
RW	2	Les Kiss
CE	3	Brett Kenny
CE	4	Gene Miles
LW	5	Michael O'Connor
FE	6	Wally Lewis (c)
HB	7	Peter Sterling
PR	8	Steve Roach
HK	9	Royce Simmons
PR	10	Bryan Niebling
SR	11	Paul Sironen
SR	12	Noel Cleal
LK	13	Bob Lindner
Substitutions:
IC	14	Terry Lamb
IC	15	Greg Dowling
Coach:
(Australia) Don Furner

Leeds were unlucky not to be awarded a try midway through the second half after it appeared that replacement forward Trevor Skerrett had managed to get the ball down after good lead up work by former Great Britain international Jeff Greyshon. However an un-sighted referee Whitfield ruled that Skerrett had been held up in-goal. Leeds only other scoring opportunity came in the first half but young winger David Creasser missed a relatively simple penalty kick from in front of the posts. Leeds' centre pairing for the game were Cronulla-Sutherland imports Andrew Ettingshausen and Mark McGaw who would play against Leeds for Australia on the 1990 Kangaroo tour. When Don Furner originally selected his team for the game, Steve Folkes was to partner Crusher Cleal in Australia's second row with Paul Sironen coming off the bench. However a minor calf injury for Folkes at training saw Sironen start in No.11 with Greg Dowling coming onto the bench.

Tuesday, 21 October

Cumbria	12 – 48	Australia
Tries: Graeme Cameron, Les Holliday; Goals: Graeme Cameron (2)		Tries: Greg Alexander (3), Terry Lamb (3), Dale Shearer (2), Gary Belcher, Mal Meninga; Goals: Terry Lamb (3); Michael O'Connor (1)

Craven Park, Barrow-in-Furness
Attendance: 4,233
Referee: John McDonald
Player of the Match: Les Davidson

Cumbria	Australia

FB	1	Gary Smith
RW	2	Michael James
CE	3	Kevin Pape
CE	4	Tony Kay
LW	5	David Beck
SO	6	Graeme Cameron (c)
SH	7	David Cairns
PR	8	David Kendall
HK	9	Colin Falcon
PR	10	Jeff Simpson
SR	11	Stephen Mossop
SR	12	Les Holliday
LF	13	Milton Huddart
Substitutions:
IC	14	Norman Lofthouse
IC	15	Bill Pattison
Coach:

FB	1	Gary Belcher
RW	2	Dale Shearer
CE	3	Chris Mortimer
CE	4	Mal Meninga
LW	5	Michael O'Connor
FE	6	Terry Lamb
HB	7	Greg Alexander
PR	8	Phil Daley
HK	9	Benny Elias (c)
PR	10	Martin Bella
SR	11	Paul Dunn
SR	12	Les Davidson
LK	13	Paul Langmack
Substitutions:
IC	14	Paul Sironen
IC	15
Coach:
(Australia) Don Furner

The Kangaroos only match against a full county lineup was played in front of the English leg's smallest crowd of just 4,233 at Craven Park in Barrow-in-Furness. As of 2024 this would be the 11th last game the Kangaroos played at the home of the Barrow club.

== The Ashes ==
=== 1st Ashes Test ===
The crowd of 50,583 for the first Test at the Old Trafford ground in Manchester, set a record for an international match on British soil, beating the previous record of 42,685 for an England vs New Zealand test at the Odsal Stadium in Bradford in 1947. The Ashes series against Great Britain saw an aggregate Ashes series crowd of 101,560 attending the three Tests, though this fell short of the record aggregate attendance of 114,883 set during the 1948–49 Kangaroo tour.

Saturday, 25 October 1986

Great Britain	16 – 38	Australia
Tries: Garry Schofield; Joe Lydon; Tony Marchant; Goals: Lee Crooks (1/3); Henderson Gill (1/1)		Tries: Gene Miles (3); Michael O'Connor (3); Garry Jack; Goals: Michael O'Connor (5/9)

Old Trafford, Manchester
Attendance: 50,583
Referee: Julien Rascagnères (France)
Player of the Match: Wally Lewis

Great Britain	Australia

FB	1	Joe Lydon
RW	2	Tony Marchant
RC	3	Garry Schofield
LC	4	Ellery Hanley
LW	5	Henderson Gill
SO	6	Tony Myler
SH	7	Deryck Fox
PR	8	Kevin Ward
HK	9	David Watkinson (c)
PR	10	John Fieldhouse
SR	11	Lee Crooks
SR	12	Ian Potter
LK	13	Andy Goodway
Substitutions:
IC	14	Shaun Edwards
IC	15	Andy Platt
Coach:
(England) Maurice Bamford

FB	1	Garry Jack
LW	2	Michael O'Connor
RC	3	Brett Kenny
LC	4	Gene Miles
RW	5	Les Kiss
FE	6	Wally Lewis (c)
HB	7	Peter Sterling
PR	8	Greg Dowling
HK	9	Royce Simmons
PR	10	Steve Roach
SR	11	Noel Cleal
SR	12	Bryan Niebling
LF	13	Bob Lindner
Substitutions:
IC	14	Terry Lamb
IC	15	Mal Meninga
Coach:
(Australia) Don Furner

The Kangaroos began their Ashes defence in a blaze of glory. Wet and windy conditions were the order of the day at Old Trafford as Gene Miles (who completely out-played Ellery Hanley) and Michael O'Connor crossed for 3 tries each. O'Connor also contributed 5 goals in the tricky conditions for a personal haul of 22 points as the Australian's took a 1–0 series lead with a convincing 38–16 win. Although soundly beaten, the Lions gave their fans something to cheer in the second half by providing something of a fightback, culminating in Joe Lydon sprinting 60 metres and out-pacing Garry Jack to score in the corner. Lydon's try created Ashes history as it was the first time in 97 tests between the two sides that a British fullback had scored a try.

Wednesday, 29 October

Halifax	2 – 36	Australia
Tries: Goals: Colin Whitfield (1/3)		Tries: Greg Alexander (2), Terry Lamb (2), Gary Belcher, Brett Kenny, Mal Meninga; Goals: Terry Lamb (4/7)

Thrum Hall, Halifax
Attendance: 7,193
Referee: Mick Beaumont
Player of the Match: Greg Alexander

Halifax	Australia

FB	1	Graham Eadie
RW	2	Scott Wilson
CE	3	Colin Whitfield
CE	4	Chris Anderson (c)
LW	5	Steve Smith
SO	6	Neil Hague
SH	7	Gary Stephens
PR	8	Keith Neller
HK	9	Chris Preece
PR	10	Brian Juliff
SR	11	Peter Bell
SR	12	Paul Dixon
LF	13	Grant Rix
Substitutions:
IC	14	Eddie Riddlesden
IC	15
Coach:
(Australia) Chris Anderson

FB	1	Gary Belcher
RW	2	Brett Kenny
CE	3	Chris Mortimer
CE	4	Mal Meninga
LW	5	Noel Cleal
FE	6	Terry Lamb
HB	7	Greg Alexander
PR	8	Paul Dunn
HK	9	Benny Elias (c)
PR	10	Martin Bella
SR	11	Paul Sironen
SR	12	Les Davidson
LK	13	Paul Langmack
Substitutions:
IC	14	Michael O'Connor
IC	15
Coach:
(Australia) Don Furner

This game saw Don Furner play a couple of players out of position with Brett Kenny and Noel Cleal on the wings.

Sunday, 2 November

St. Helens	8 – 32	Australia
Tries: Goals: Paul Loughlin (4)		Tries: Dale Shearer (2), Noel Cleal, Mal Meninga, Gene Miles, Bryan Niebling; Goals: Mal Meninga (3); Terry Lamb (1)

Knowsley Road, St. Helens
Attendance: 15,381
Referee: Fred Lindop

St Helens	Australia

FB	1	Phil Veivers
RW	2	Barry Ledger
CE	3	Paul Loughlin
CE	4	Steve Halliwell
LW	5	Kevin McCormack
SO	6	Brett Clark
SH	7	Neil Holding (c)
PR	8	Tony Burke
HK	9	Graham Liptrot
PR	10	Paul Forber
SR	11	Roy Heggerty
SR	12	Andy Platt
LF	13	Chris Arkwright
Substitutions:
IC	14	Shaun Allen
IC	15	Paul Round
Coach:
(England) Alex Murphy

FB	1	Garry Jack
RW	2	Dale Shearer
CE	3	Brett Kenny
CE	4	Gene Miles
LW	5	Mal Meninga
FE	6	Wally Lewis (c)
HB	7	Peter Sterling
PR	8	Greg Dowling
HK	9	Royce Simmons
PR	10	Steve Roach
SR	11	Noel Cleal
SR	12	Bryan Neibling
LK	13	Bob Lindner
Substitutions:
IC	14	Terry Lamb
IC	15	Paul Dunn
Coach:
(Australia) Don Furner

With the exception of Mal Meninga on the wing in place of a resting Michael O'Connor (Meninga had played for St Helens in 1984–85 and remained a crowd favourite at Knowsley Road), the Kangaroos played with the expected 2nd Test line up. Dale Shearer had replaced the injured Les Kiss on the wing and highlighted his return to the top side with a 70-metre intercept try in the first half that in effect gave a clean bill of health to a previously injured groin muscle.

Steve Roach's tour effectively ended after dislocating his elbow during the match which would see Don Furner use Paul Dunn in the front row for the second test.

Tuesday, 4 November

Oldham	16 – 22	Australia
Tries: Colin Hawkyard, Des Foy; Goals: Mick Worrall (3/5); David Hobbs (1/1)		Tries: Terry Lamb (2), Ben Elias, Greg Alexander; Goals: Michael O'Connor (3/6); Mal Meninga (0/1)

The Watersheddings, Oldham
Attendance: 5,678
Referee: Mick Beaumont

Oldham	Australia

FB	1	Jeff Edwards
RW	2	Paul Sherman
CE	3	Des Foy
CE	4	Gary Warnecke
LW	5	Hussein M'Barki
SO	6	David Topliss (c)
SH	7	Ray Ashton
PR	8	Bruce Clark
HK	9	Terry Flanagan
PR	10	Neil Clawson
SR	11	David Hobbs
SR	12	Mick Worrall
LF	13	Stuart Raper
Substitutions:
IC	14	Colin Hawkyard
IC	15	Tony Nadiole
Coach:
(England) Frank Myler

FB	1	Gary Belcher
RW	2	Dale Shearer
CE	3	Chris Mortimer
CE	4	Mal Meninga
LW	5	Michael O'Connor
FE	6	Terry Lamb
HB	7	Greg Alexander
PR	8	Phil Daley
HK	9	Benny Elias (c)
PR	10	Martin Bella
SR	11	Steve Folkes
SR	12	Les Davidson
LK	13	Paul Langmack
Substitutions:
IC	14	Paul Sironen
IC	15
Coach:
(Australia) Don Furner

Oldham put up a spirited display against the Kangaroos before going down by the closest score of the tour, 22–16. This would be the last time the touring Kangaroos would play Oldham. In the Oldham team that night was David Topliss who had played for Great Britain in the third test in 1982 and was part of the Hull team who narrowly lost to the 1982 Kangaroos

=== 2nd Ashes Test ===
Great Britain coach Maurice Bamford surprisingly made only one change to the team that had lost heavily in Manchester. Centre Ellery Hanley was ruled out through injury and replaced by St. Helens winger Barry Ledger, with Tony Marchant moving from the wing to partner Garry Schofield in the centres. Bamford came in for heavy criticism from former Great Britain and England internationals for his selections. For the Kangaroos, Dale Shearer made his return to the Test team replacing the injured Les Kiss on the wing, while Canterbury-Bankstown forward Paul Dunn returned to the team in the front row replacing Steve Roach who had dislocated his elbow in the win over St. Helens.

Saturday, 8 November 1986

Great Britain	4 – 34	Australia
Tries: Garry Schofield Goals: Lee Crooks (0/1)		Tries: Garry Jack (2); Bob Lindner; Michael O'Connor; Wally Lewis; Brett Kenny; Goals: Michael O'Connor (5/8)

Elland Road, Leeds
Attendance: 30,808
Referee: Julien Rascagnères (France)
Player of the Match: Noel Cleal

Great Britain	Australia

FB	1	Joe Lydon
RW	2	Barry Ledger
RC	3	Garry Schofield
LC	4	Tony Marchant
LW	5	Henderson Gill
SO	6	Tony Myler
SH	7	Deryck Fox
PR	8	Kevin Ward
HK	9	David Watkinson (c)
PR	10	John Fieldhouse
SR	11	Lee Crooks
SR	12	Ian Potter
LK	13	Andy Goodway
Substitutions:
IC	14	Shaun Edwards
IC	15	Andy Platt
Coach:
(England) Maurice Bamford

FB	1	Garry Jack
LW	2	Michael O'Connor
RC	3	Brett Kenny
LC	4	Gene Miles
RW	5	Dale Shearer
FE	6	Wally Lewis (c)
HB	7	Peter Sterling
PR	8	Greg Dowling
HK	9	Royce Simmons
PR	10	Paul Dunn
SR	11	Noel Cleal
SR	12	Bryan Niebling
LF	13	Bob Lindner
Substitutions:
IC	14	Terry Lamb
IC	15	Mal Meninga
Coach:
(Australia) Don Furner

After an even start, during which the Lions had made a couple of line breaks that had the Australian defence scrambling, the Kangaroos ran riot in the second Test, wrapping up The Ashes with a six tries to one, 34–4 win in front of 30,808 at Elland Road. The Lions only try came late in the game. Australia led 34-0 when Kangaroos fullback Garry Jack, who had scored two tries, pushed a pass 10 metres from his line to Michael O'Connor. The Aussie winger dropped the ball (which was bullet like and at his knees) and it was pounced upon by Schofield who scored only 15 metres wide of the posts. Lee Crooks missed the relatively easy conversion of his team's only try, summing up the Lions day. Such was the Kangaroos dominance that this was the only kick at goal the Lions managed throughout the match.

Bob Lindner scored the opening try of the game after backing up a strong burst up the middle by Noel Cleal. O'Connor converted the try and was also next to score after taking a cut-out pass from Peter Sterling near his own quarter line. After racing around the Lions defence, O'Connor kicked ahead as Joe Lydon loomed and easily won the 55 metre race to the ball for the try. He converted his own try to give Australia a 12–0 lead which they took into half time. The floodgates opened in the second though and the Kangaroos blew the Lions away with a powerful performance. Two tries to Garry Jack and one each to Wally Lewis and Brett Kenny saw Australia leading 34–0 before Schofield's try at least gave the crowd something to cheer. Before Kenny's try with the score at 28–0, the crowd, far from impressed with the Lions performance, had even begun to chant "What a load of rubbish" (clearly audible on the television coverage) and were actually applauding the Kangaroos open style of play.

In his television commentary of the game, former Australian dual-rugby international and 1959-60 Kangaroo tour vice-captain Rex Mossop summed up the game when calling Brett Kenny's try, stating that "Australia carved them up. They've decimated, dissected and absolutely diabolically destroyed this Great Britain side today".

Wednesday, 12 November

Widnes	4 – 20	Australia
Tries: Goals: Mick Burke (2)		Tries: Greg Alexander, Martin Bella, Chris Mortimer; Goals: Terry Lamb (2); Mal Meninga (2)

Naughton Park, Widnes
Attendance: 10,268
Referee: Geoff Berry

Widnes	Australia

FB	1	Mick Burke
RW	2	Dave Moran
CE	3	Darren Wright
CE	4	Barry Dowd
LW	5	John Basnett
SO	6	Tony Myler (c)
SH	7	David Hulme
PR	8	Steve O'Neill
HK	9	Phil McKenzie
PR	10	Mike O'Neill
SR	11	Richard Eyres
SR	12	Paul Hulme
LF	13	Harry Pinner
Substitutions:
IC	14
IC	15
Coach:
(England) Doug Laughton

FB	1	Gary Belcher
RW	2	Dale Shearer
CE	3	Chris Mortimer
CE	4	Mal Meninga
LW	5	Les Kiss
FE	6	Terry Lamb
HB	7	Greg Alexander
PR	8	Les Davidson
HK	9	Benny Elias (c)
PR	10	Martin Bella
SR	11	Paul Sironen
SR	12	Steve Folkes
LK	13	Paul Langmack
Substitutions:
IC	14	Brett Kenny
IC	15	Phil Daley
Coach:
(Australia) Don Furner

Sunday, 16 November

Hull F.C.	0 – 48	Australia
Tries: Goals:		Tries: Terry Lamb (2), Des Hasler (2), Peter Sterling, Mal Meninga, Gene Miles, Garry Jack, Dale Shearer; Goals: Michael O'Connor (6)

The Boulevard, Hull
Attendance: 8,231
Referee: John McDonald

Hull F.C.	Australia

FB	1	Gary Kemble
RW	2	Paul Eastwood
CE	3	Dane O'Hara
CE	4	Stewart Vass
LW	5	Carl McCoid
SO	6	Fred Ah Kuoi
SH	7	Phil Windley
PR	8	Dave Brown
HK	9	Steve Crooks
PR	10	Andy Dannatt
SR	11	Steve Norton
SR	12	Lee Crooks (c)
LF	13	Tracy Lazenby
Substitutions:
IC	14	Gary Pearce
IC	15	Jon Sharp
Coach:
(England) Len Casey

FB	1	Garry Jack
RW	2	Dale Shearer
CE	3	Gene Miles
CE	4	Mal Meninga
LW	5	Michael O'Connor
FE	6	Terry Lamb
HB	7	Peter Sterling (c)
PR	8	Greg Dowling
HK	9	Royce Simmons
PR	10	Phil Daley
SR	11	Noel Cleal
SR	12	Bryan Neibling
LK	13	Paul Langmack
Substitutions:
IC	14	Des Hasler
IC	15	Les Davidson
Coach:
(Australia) Don Furner

15 minutes into the game, Kangaroos second rower Noel Cleal broke his arm in the game against Hull which not only ended his tour but it also proved to be the end of his test career. While he returned to representative football in 1987 and 1988 playing for NSW, he would never again gain test selection. Peter Sterling, who had played for Hull during the 1984–85 English season and led them to the Challenge Cup Final, was given the honour of captaining the Kangaroos against his former club and scored the first try after a 40-metre scoot down the sideline showing surprising pace to beat former Hull teammate and New Zealand test fullback Gary Kemble.

After breaking his thumb during the first half of the second tour game against Hull Kingston Rovers at Craven Park, Des Hasler returned to the side off the bench and scored two tries. Hasler came on to replace his Manly-Warringah teammate Cleal, moving to lock and pushing Paul Langmack to the 2nd row. Rex Mossop in TV commentary told that while Hasler was selected for the game it was planned that with his left hand still heavily bandaged that he would only play the last 5 minutes. However, as the other replacement Les Davidson had already been called on to replace Bryan Neibling who suffered a corked thigh only 10 minutes into the game, Hasler had to play far more minutes than Don Furner had originally planned.

Tuesday, 18 November

Bradford Northern	0 – 38	Australia
Tries: Goals:		Tries: Bob Lindner, Greg Alexander, Chris Mortimer, Wally Lewis, Mal Meninga, Terry Lamb, Brett Kenny; Goals: Greg Alexander (5)

Odsal Stadium, Bradford
Attendance: 10,633
Referee: Derek Fox

Bradford Northern	Australia

FB	1	Keith Mumby (c)
RW	2	Phil Ford
CE	3	Steve Donlan
CE	4	Phil Hellewell
LW	5	Roger Simpson
SO	6	John Woods
SH	7	Terry Holmes
PR	8	Ian Howcroft
HK	9	Gary Brentley
PR	10	Mario Fenech
SR	11	Dick Jasiewicz
SR	12	Karl Fairbank
LF	13	Mal Graham
Substitutions:
IC	14	Brian Noble
IC	15	Ian Sherratt
Coach:
(England) Barry Seabourne

FB	1	Gary Belcher
LW	2	Greg Alexander
CE	3	Brett Kenny
CE	4	Chris Mortimer
RW	5	Dale Shearer
FE	6	Wally Lewis (c)
HB	7	Des Hasler
PR	8	Paul Dunn
HK	9	Royce Simmons
PR	10	Martin Bella
SR	11	Les Davidson
SR	12	Paul Sironen
LK	13	Bob Lindner
Substitutions:
IC	14	Terry Lamb
IC	15	Mal Meninga
Coach:
(Australia) Don Furner

This match was played in heavy rain and fog. The match saw the most even spread of Australia's "Kangaroos" and "Emu's" (midweek) teams on the tour with 7 non-test and 8 test players in the selected XV.

=== 3rd Ashes Test ===
This match also counted as part of the 1985–88 Rugby League World Cup and was the only match of the series played at a regular rugby league ground, the first two Tests having been played in soccer stadiums to take advantage of the greater spectator capacity. It was also the last Ashes Test in England played at a club home ground until the 2001 Kangaroo tour. Also this would end up being the last Ashes Great Britain v Australia test match to be played at Wigan's Central Park as the ground would be demolished after the 1999 season.

The only Australian team change from the second Test win was Mal Meninga coming off the bench into the second row to replace the injured Noel Cleal (broken arm) with South Sydney forward Les Davidson named on the bench in his Test debut. With the loss of Cleal, Australian coach Don Furner was mulling over whom to replace him with when team captain Wally Lewis suggested moving Meninga to the back row, reasoning that there would be little disruption to the team as both Mal and "Crusher" Cleal were roughly the same size and were fast, skilled players who played a similar style of game. After heavy criticism of his selections for the first two tests from a number of former Great Britain internationals, Maurice Bamford made five changes to the Lions with the recall of halfback Andy Gregory, centre David Stephenson, winger John Basnett and back rowers Chris Burton and Harry Pinner.

Saturday, 22 November 1986

Great Britain	15 – 24	Australia
Tries: Garry Schofield (2) Goals: Joe Lydon (2/3); Henderson Gill (1/1); Field Goals: Garry Schofield (1)		Tries: Gene Miles; Bob Lindner; Dale Shearer (PT); Wally Lewis; Goals: Michael O'Connor (4/5)

Central Park, Wigan
Attendance: 20,169
Referee: Julien Rascagnères (France)
Player of the Match: Paul Dunn

Great Britain	Australia

FB	1	Joe Lydon
LW	2	Henderson Gill
RC	3	Garry Schofield
LC	4	David Stephenson
RW	5	John Basnett
SO	6	Tony Myler
SH	7	Andy Gregory
PR	8	Kevin Ward
HK	9	David Watkinson (c)
PR	10	Lee Crooks
SR	11	Chris Burton
SR	12	Andy Goodway
LK	13	Harry Pinner
Substitutions:
IC	14	Shaun Edwards
IC	15	Ian Potter
Coach:
(England) Maurice Bamford

FB	1	Garry Jack
LW	2	Michael O'Connor
RC	3	Brett Kenny
LC	4	Gene Miles
RW	5	Dale Shearer
FE	6	Wally Lewis (c)
HB	7	Peter Sterling
PR	8	Greg Dowling
HK	9	Royce Simmons
PR	10	Paul Dunn
SR	11	Mal Meninga
SR	12	Bryan Niebling
LF	13	Bob Lindner
Substitutions:
IC	14	Terry Lamb
IC	15	Les Davidson
Coach:
(Australia) Don Furner

As with the 1982 Ashes series, the third Test was the most genuinely contested of the Tests played, with the Lions putting in a much improved performance. Centre Gene Miles opened the scoring in the early minutes of the game and when lock forward Bob Lindner also scored soon after, plus both tries being successfully converted by Michael O'Connor, saw the Kangaroos race to a 12–0 lead after just 15 minutes and another rout looked on the cards. However, the Lions dug deep and tries to Garry Schofield either side of half time saw the game tied at 12-all with the Lions looking like possible winners for the first time in the series.

The game was in the balance until French referee Julien Rascagneres, refereeing the 9th and ultimately last Test match of his career, awarded a penalty try to Australian winger Dale Shearer after he was illegally tackled by his opposite John Basnett when both were chasing the ball which Shearer had kicked downfield. A penalty goal to Joe Lydon and a field goal by Schofield reduced the deficit to 18–15, but Wally Lewis then put the result beyond doubt with a try after bamboozling the Lions defence with two dummies near the sideline before racing around to score beside the posts.

== France ==
Wednesday, 26 November

President's XIII	4 – 36	Australia

Parc des Princes, Paris
Attendance: 800

=== First Test ===
Sunday, 30 November 1986

France	2 – 44	Australia
Tries: Goals: Gilles Dumas (1/2)		Tries: Michael O'Connor (3); Bob Lindner (2); Gene Miles (2); Garry Jack; Goals: Michael O'Connor (4/9)

Stade Gilbert Brutus, Perpignan
Attendance: 6,000
Referee: Fred Lindop (England)
Player of the Match: Michael O'Connor

France	Australia

FB	1	Gilles Dumas
RW	2	Didier Couston
RC	3	Roger Palisses
LC	4	Alain Maury
LW	5	Hugues Ratier
SO	6	Dominique Espugna
SH	7	Patrick Entat
PR	8	Max Chantal
HK	9	Thierry Bernabé
PR	10	Jean-Luc Rabot
SR	11	Guy Laforgue (c)
SR	12	Serge Titeux
LK	13	Daniel Verdes
Substitutions:
IC	14	Serge Bret
IC	15	Francis Laforgue
Coach:

FB	1	Garry Jack
RW	2	Dale Shearer
RC	3	Brett Kenny
LC	4	Gene Miles
LW	5	Michael O'Connor
FE	6	Wally Lewis (c)
HB	7	Peter Sterling
PR	8	Greg Dowling
HK	9	Royce Simmons
PR	10	Paul Dunn
SR	11	Les Davidson
SR	12	Bryan Niebling
LF	13	Bob Lindner
Substitutions:
IC	14	Terry Lamb
IC	15	Paul Sironen
Coach:
(Australia) Don Furner

Wednesday, 3 December

Le Pontet XIII	5 – 42	Australia

Stade de Fargues, Le Pontet
Attendance: 2,500

Friday, 5 December

Midi-Pyrénées XIII	2 – 12	Australia

Stade des Minimes, Toulouse
Attendance: 1,500

Sunday, 7 December

France B	0 – 50	Australia

Stade Municipal d'Albi, Albi
Attendance: 2,000

Wednesday, 10 December

Aquitaine	8 – 50	Australia

Stade Max Rousie, Villeneuve-sur-Lot
Attendance: 500

=== Second Test ===
Australia's win over France in the final match of the tour, which counted as part of the ongoing 1985-88 World Cup tournament, was a record margin for a Test match.

Saturday, 13 December

France	0 – 52	Australia
Tries: Goals:		Tries: Dale Shearer (4); Garry Jack (3); Steve Folkes; Bryan Niebling; Michael O'Connor; Goals: Michael O'Connor (6/10)

Stade d'Albert Domec, Carcassonne
Attendance: 5,000
Referee: Fred Lindop (England)
Player of the Match: Dale Shearer

France	Australia

FB	1	Patrick Wosniak
RW	2	Sebastian Rodriguez
RC	3	Philippe Fourquet
LC	4	Francis Laforgue
LW	5	Hugues Ratier
SO	6	Roger Palisses
SH	7	Christian Scicchitano
PR	8	Max Chantal
HK	9	Thierry Bernabé
PR	10	Serge Titeux
SR	11	Guy Laforgue (c)
SR	12	Daniel Verdes
LK	13	Philippe Gestas
Substitutions:
IC	14	Gilles Dumas
IC	15	Yves Storer
Coach:

FB	1	Garry Jack
RW	2	Dale Shearer
RC	3	Brett Kenny
LC	4	Gene Miles
LW	5	Michael O'Connor
FE	6	Wally Lewis (c)
HB	7	Peter Sterling
PR	8	Greg Dowling
HK	9	Royce Simmons
PR	10	Paul Dunn
SR	11	Steve Folkes
SR	12	Bryan Niebling
LF	13	Bob Lindner
Substitutions:
IC	14	Terry Lamb
IC	15	Les Davidson
Coach:
(Australia) Don Furner

== Statistics ==
Leading Try Scorer

- 19 by Terry Lamb

Leading Point Scorer

- 170 by Michael O'Connor (13 tries, 59 goals)

Largest Attendance

- 50,583 - First test vs Great Britain at Old Trafford

Largest Club Game Attendance

- 30,662 - Wigan vs Australia at Central Park
