= 1985–1988 Rugby League World Cup =

9th Rugby League World Cup tournament

1985–1988 World Cup
- Number of teams: 5
- Winner: Australia (6th title)
- Matches played: 18
- Attendance: 218,246 (12,125 per match)
- Points scored: 769 (42.72 per match)
- Top scorer: (Australia) Michael O'Connor (100)
- Top try scorer: (Australia) Michael O'Connor (8)

The 1985–1988 Rugby League World Cup (sometimes shortened to 1988 Rugby League World Cup) was the ninth edition of the Rugby League World Cup. Unlike previous World Cups that were held over a couple of months, this World Cup was held over the course of three years with teams playing each other on a home and away basis.

World Cup games were fitted into the normal international programme of three-match test series between the nations, with a pre-designated match from each series counting as the world cup fixture. The tournament culminated in the 1988 Rugby League World Cup final.

France were unable to fulfil their 1987 tour of Australasia due to financial difficulties, and had to forfeit away fixtures against Australia, New Zealand and Papua New Guinea, who were invited to participate for the first time.

At the end of four years, Australia finished top of the table, and, through a victory over Great Britain in Christchurch, the Kiwis qualified to join them in the final. Despite finishing top of the table, poor international attendances since the mid-1970s meant the Australians declined to host the final, and asked New Zealand Rugby League to host the World Cup final at Eden Park in Auckland; Cup organisers and New Zealand officials accepted this request.

In front of a record New Zealand attendance of over 47,000 the Kiwis lost 25–12 to the Australians.

== Venues ==
(Australia) Sydney	(England) Wigan	(Australia) Brisbane	(England) Leeds
Sydney Football Stadium	Central Park	Lang Park	Headingley
Capacity: 40,000	Capacity: 37,000	Capacity: 32,500	Capacity: 22,000
(New Zealand) Auckland	(Papua New Guinea) Port Moresby	(New Zealand) Christchurch	(France) Avignon
Carlaw Park	Lloyd Robson Oval	Addington Showgrounds	Parc des Sports
Capacity: 20,000	Capacity: 17,000	Capacity: 15,000	Capacity: 15,000
(France) Perpignan	(Australia) Wagga Wagga	(France) Carcassonne	
Stade Gilbert Brutus	Eric Weissel Oval	Stade Albert Domec	
Capacity: 13,000	Capacity: 12,000	Capacity: 10,000	
		|}	

=== Final ===
The World Cup final was held at Eden Park in Auckland, New Zealand.

(New Zealand) Auckland
Eden Park
Capacity: 48,000
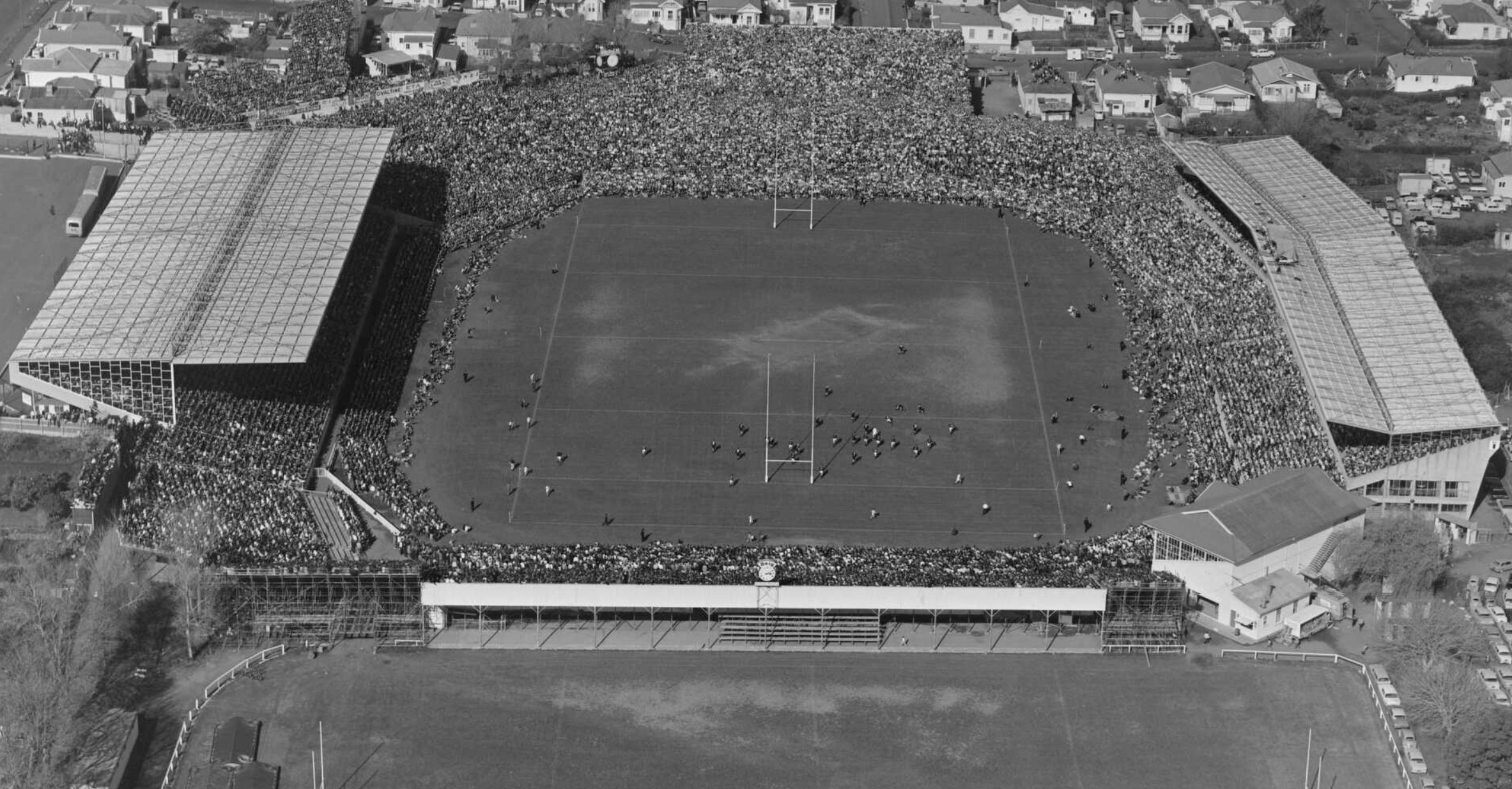

== Results ==
=== 1985 ===
7 July

New Zealand	18 – 0	Australia

Carlaw Park, Auckland
Attendance: 15,327

9 November

Great Britain	6 – 6	New Zealand

Elland Road, Leeds
Attendance: 22,209

7 December

France	0 – 22	New Zealand

Stade Gilbert Brutus, Perpignan
Attendance: 5,000

=== 1986 ===
16 February

France	10 – 10	Great Britain

Parc des Sports, Avignon
Attendance: 4,000

29 July

Australia	32 – 12	New Zealand

Lang Park, Brisbane
Attendance: 22,811

17 August

Papua New Guinea	24 – 22	New Zealand

Lloyd Robson Oval, Port Moresby
Attendance: 15,000

4 October

Papua New Guinea	12 – 62	Australia

Lloyd Robson Oval, Port Moresby
Attendance: 17,000

This match was the third Test of the 1986 Kangaroo tour of Great Britain and France's Ashes series.

22 November

Great Britain	15 – 24	Australia

Central Park, Wigan
Attendance: 20,169
Referee: J. Rascagneres

This was the final Test match of the 1986 Kangaroo tour of Great Britain and France.

13 December

France	0 – 52	Australia

Stade d'Albert Domec, Carcassonne
Attendance: 5,000

=== 1987 ===
24 January

Great Britain	52 – 4	France

Headingley, Leeds
Attendance: 6,567

24 October

Great Britain	42 – 0	Papua New Guinea

Central Park, Wigan
Attendance: 9,121

15 November

France	21 – 4	Papua New Guinea

Stade d'Albert Domec, Carcassonne
Attendance: 5,000

=== 1988 ===
22 May

Papua New Guinea	22 – 42	Great Britain

Lloyd Robson Oval, Port Moresby
Attendance: 12,107

The victory lifted Great Britain above New Zealand into second place on the World Cup table on eight points – one ahead of the Kiwis.

9 July

Australia	12 – 26	Great Britain

Sydney Football Stadium, Sydney
Attendance: 15,944

This was the end of a 15-match winning streak for the Australians, and Great Britain's first Test victory over the Kangaroos since their 18–14 win at Odsal during the 1978 Kangaroo tour, as well as their first win in Australia for 18 years. It also put Great Britain on top of the World Cup points table.

10 July

New Zealand	66 – 14	Papua New Guinea

Carlaw Park, Auckland
Attendance: 8,392

17 July

New Zealand	12 – 10	Great Britain

Addington Showground, Christchurch
Attendance: 8,525

The last group stage match for both teams turned out to be a sudden death battle for a spot in the final. For New Zealand nothing less than a win would get them to the Final while Great Britain only needed a draw. It was also the last Test match of the 1988 Great Britain Lions tour. The Kiwis victory meant they qualified to face Australia in the final at Eden Park, Auckland.

20 July

Australia	70 – 8	Papua New Guinea

Eric Weissel Oval, Wagga Wagga
Attendance: 11,685

Australia's 62-point win set a new record for largest winning margin in international rugby league. Winger Michael O'Connor also set a new record for most points scored by an individual in international rugby league. The sellout crowd of 11,685 also set a ground attendance record at Wagga Wagga's Eric Weissel Oval.

== Tournament standings ==
Team	Pld	W	D	L	PF	PA	PD	Pts	Qualification
Australia	8	6	0	2	252	91	+161	12 (Note: France's 1987 away fixtures against Australia, New Zealand and Papua New Guinea were scratched and each team awarded two points as the French were unable to tour Australasia that year due to financial difficulties.)	Qualified for the World Cup final
New Zealand	8	5	1	2	158	86	+72	11	Qualified for the World Cup final
Great Britain	8	4	2	2	203	90	+113	10	
Papua New Guinea	8	2	0	6	84	325	−241	4	
France	8	1	1	6	35	140	−105	3	

== World Cup final ==
9 October 1988
14:30

New Zealand	12–25	Australia
Tries: Kevin Iro; Tony Iro Goals: Peter Brown (2/5)		Tries: Allan Langer (2); Gavin Miller; Dale Shearer; Goals: Michael O'Connor (4/7); Field Goal: Ben Elias

Eden Park, Auckland
Attendance: 47,363
Referee: Graham Ainui (Papua New Guinea)
Player of the Match: Gavin Miller

New Zealand	Australia

FB	1	Gary Mercer
RW	2	Tony Iro
RC	3	Kevin Iro
LC	4	Dean Bell (c)
LW	5	Mark Elia
FE	6	Gary Freeman
HB	7	Clayton Friend
PR	8	Peter Brown
HK	9	Wayne Wallace
PR	10	Adrian Shelford
SR	11	Mark Graham
SR	12	Kurt Sorensen
LF	13	Mark Horo
Substitutions:
IC	14	Shane Cooper
IC	15	Sam Stewart
Coach:
(New Zealand) Tony Gordon

FB	1	Garry Jack
RW	2	Dale Shearer
RC	3	Andrew Farrar
LC	4	Mark McGaw
LW	5	Michael O'Connor
FE	6	Wally Lewis (c)
HB	7	Allan Langer
PR	8	Paul Dunn
HK	9	Benny Elias
PR	10	Steve Roach
SR	11	Paul Sironen
SR	12	Gavin Miller
LF	13	Wayne Pearce
Substitutions:
IC	14	David Gillespie
IC	15	Terry Lamb
Coach:
(Australia) Don Furner

The 1985–1988 Rugby League World Cup saw New Zealand play Australia in the World Cup final, the culmination of four years of competition. The Final was played at the spiritual home of rugby union in New Zealand, Auckland's Eden Park. It was the first time that rugby league had been played at the ground since 1919. The final attracted the highest ever crowd for a rugby league match in New Zealand of 47,363 (only 672 less than had attended the 1987 Rugby World Cup final at the venue). Australia had won the right to host the final, but in the interests of promoting the game, and because attendances for internationals played in Australia had been dwindling for over a decade due to the Kangaroos dominance, the ARL agreed to move the game to New Zealand. Prior to kick-off Graham Brazier performed the New Zealand national anthem.

Despite Australia's successful Ashes defence against Great Britain earlier in the year, the inexperience of the Australian World Cup final team (and because NZ had defeated Australia in their previous encounter in a one-off test in Brisbane in 1987), saw the hosts actually go into the match as favourites in the eyes of many critics. However, the Wally Lewis led Kangaroos, boasting veteran test players Garry Jack, Dale Shearer, Michael O'Connor, Steve Roach, Paul Dunn, Wayne Pearce, and Terry Lamb, along with 1986 Kangaroos Ben Elias and Paul Sironen, mixed with newer international players Mark McGaw, Allan Langer, Gavin Miller, Andrew Farrar and David Gillespie, triumphed over the ill-disciplined Kiwis, who at least made sure the victorious Australians were bloodied and bruised for their victory lap. For the Kiwis, the Iro brothers Tony and Kevin, Gary Freeman, Clayton Friend, Mark Graham, Adrian Shelford, Kurt Sorensen and captain Dean Bell dished out the punishment.

Despite Queensland having won the State of Origin series 3–0 over New South Wales earlier in the year, the Maroons only supplied three of Australia's 15 players for the World Cup final. Captain Wally Lewis (who broke his right forearm in the 15th minute of the game while tackling Tony Iro), Dale Shearer and Allan Langer. Lewis later claimed that it was the same as had been the case since Origin started in 1980, Qld wins the series but it was mainly NSW players picked for Australia.

== Try scorers ==
8

- (Australia) Michael O'Connor

6

- (Australia) Dale Shearer

5

- (Australia) Garry Jack
- (Australia) Wally Lewis

4

- (Australia) Alan Langer
- (United Kingdom) Shaun Edwards
- (United Kingdom) Henderson Gill
- (United Kingdom) Mike Gregory
- (United Kingdom) Ellery Hanley
- (United Kingdom) Garry Schofield
- (New Zealand) Kevin Iro
- (Papua New Guinea) Dairi Kovae

3

- (New Zealand) Shane Horo
- (New Zealand) Hugh McGahan
- (New Zealand) Darrell Williams

2

- (Australia) Noel Cleal
- (Australia) Brett Kenny
- (Australia) Les Kiss
- (Australia) Bob Lindner
- (Australia) Mal Meninga
- (Australia) Gavin Miller
- (Australia) Gene Miles
- (France) David Fraisse
- (United Kingdom) Phil Ford
- (United Kingdom) Joe Lydon
- (United Kingdom) Paul Medley
- (New Zealand) Gary Freeman
- (New Zealand) Clayton Friend
- (New Zealand) Mark Graham
- (New Zealand) Gary Mercer
- (New Zealand) Wayne Wallace
- (Papua New Guinea) Darius Haili
- (Papua New Guinea) Bal Numapo

1

- (Australia) Sam Backo
- (Australia) Greg Conescu
- (Australia) Tony Currie
- (Australia) Steve Folkes
- (Australia) Wally Fullerton-Smith
- (Australia) Des Hasler
- (Australia) Chris Mortimer
- (Australia) Bryan Niebling
- (Australia) Steve Roach
- (Australia) Peter Sterling
- (France) Gilles Dumas
- (France) Cyril Pons
- (France) Hugues Ratier
- (United Kingdom) Mark Forster
- (United Kingdom) Andy Goodway
- (United Kingdom) Andy Gregory
- (United Kingdom) David Hulme
- (United Kingdom) Paul Loughlin
- (United Kingdom) Martin Offiah
- (United Kingdom) David Stephenson
- (New Zealand) Peter Brown
- (New Zealand) Tony Iro
- (New Zealand) Gary Kemble
- (New Zealand) A'au James Leuluai
- (New Zealand) Joe Ropati
- (New Zealand) Adrian Shelford
- (New Zealand) Kurt Sorensen
- (Papua New Guinea) Bobby Ako
- (Papua New Guinea) Lauta Atoi
- (Papua New Guinea) Arnold Krewanty
- (Papua New Guinea) Michael Matmillo
- (Papua New Guinea) Mea Morea
- (Papua New Guinea) Isaac Rop
