= Maurice Bamford =

English rugby league footballer and coach (1936–2019)

Personal information
- Born: 20 April 1936 Leeds, West Riding of Yorkshire, England
- Died: 23 May 2019 (aged 83)

Playing information
Club
Years	Team	Pld	T	G	FG	P
	Hull FC
1957–63	Dewsbury
	Total	0	0	0	0	0

Coaching information
Club
Years	Team	Gms	W	D	L	W%
1974	Dewsbury
1978–80	Halifax
1980–81	Huddersfield
1981–82	Wigan	69	37	3	29	54
1982–83	Bramley	45	23	2	20	51
1983–85	Leeds	54	34	4	16	63
1986–88	Leeds	57	31	3	23	54
1988	Workington Town	2	0	0	2	0
1988–90	Dewsbury	4	3	0	1	75
1992–93	Bramley	1	0	0	1	0
1997	Prescot Panthers
2000	Lancashire Lynx
	Total	232	128	12	92	55
Representative
Years	Team	Gms	W	D	L	W%
1984–86	Great Britain	10	3	2	5	30
1988	Great Britain	1	1	0	0	100

Maurice Bamford (20 April 1936 – 23 May 2019) was an English professional rugby league footballer and coach. He also went on to write several books on rugby league.

== Early life ==
Bamford was born in Leeds, West Riding of Yorkshire, England. He attended Sacred Heart Roman Catholic School in Leeds. He was introduced to rugby league in 1945 when he played for his school immediately after the end of the Second World War.

== Playing career ==
He signed professional forms for Hull F.C. in 1953, but never played in the first team. He was transferred to Dewsbury in 1957. His professional playing career was cut short due to injuries, eventually retiring in 1963.

== Coaching career ==
=== Club level ===
After retiring as a player, Bamford moved into coaching. In 1972, he joined Dewsbury as assistant coach to Tommy Smales, and was part of the coaching staff when Dewsbury won the championship in the 1972–73 season. Bamford was appointed as head coach when Smales left the club in 1974, but was only in charge for a few months before being replaced by Alan Hardisty. After spending time at Bradford Northern as an assistant to Peter Fox, he joined Halifax in March 1978, who were bottom of the Second Division and hadn't won a game all season. He dramatically turned around the club's fortunes, missing out on promotion by one point in the 1978–79 season. In the following season, Halifax finished second in the league, winning promotion to the First Division. The club also reached the Yorkshire Cup final, but were defeated 15–6 by Leeds.

Bamford left Halifax in May 1980 to join Huddersfield for the 1980–81 season, taking them to a 5th place finish in the Second Division. He then coached Wigan during the 1981–82 season, who had just returned to the First Division after being relegated two seasons ago. After the club finished in 11th, five points above the relegation places, Bamford was sacked and replaced by Alex Murphy. Bamford was then appointed head coach at Bramley. Between November 1983 and February 1985, he was coach at Leeds, and won the 1983–84 John Player Special Trophy 18–10 against Widnes.

In 1985, Bamford was the first ever appointed full-time Development Officer for rugby league in the UK when he served for the Leeds City Council Leisure Services for two and a half years.

He returned to Leeds for a second coaching spell between December 1986 and April 1988. He reached the final of the John Player Special Trophy again in the 1987–88 season, but were this time beaten finalists, losing 14–15 to St Helens. In his later years, he had additional spells at Dewsbury and Bramley, as well as coaching Workington Town, Prescot Panthers and Lancashire Lynx.

=== Great Britain ===
His career also included a three-year stint as Great Britain coach between 1984 and 1987 with test series against Australia, New Zealand and France. His term as coach of the national side also included the formation of the Great Britain under-21 team. He was succeeded as Great Britain coach by Mal Reilly.

During the 1986 Ashes series between Great Britain and Australia on their 1986 Kangaroo tour, Bamford came in for heavy criticism from a number of former Great Britain and England internationals for his selections of both the first and second test teams. After the Lions lost the first test 38-16 at Old Trafford in Manchester, many expected mass changes to the team for the second test. However, the only change came when centre Ellery Hanley was ruled out with injury and was replaced by St. Helens winger Barry Ledger. The Lions lost the test and the series as the Kangaroos ran riot, running in six tries to one in a 34-4 hiding at Elland Road in Leeds. Garry Schofield scored the only try for the home side which came when Michael O'Connor dropped a low pass from fullback Garry Jack. At no other time in the game did the Lions look like scoring. Five changes were made to the team for the third test at Wigan's Central Park with the result being closer than many predicted, though the Australians completed a clean sweep defeating Great Britain 24-15. Many English fans believed that French referee Julien Rascagnères giving a penalty try to Australian winger Dale Shearer as well as allowing a contentious try to Kangaroos captain Wally Lewis midway through the second half ended any hope of the Lions snatching an unlikely victory.

== Media work ==
After retiring from coaching, Bamford made regular appearances on radio and television, and wrote a column for the Manchester Evening News. He also wrote a number of books on rugby league, including biographies of former players Geoff Gunney, Arthur Clues, Jeff Grayshon, Vince Karalius, Jim Mills and Frank Myler.

Bamford died on 23 May 2019, aged 83, after being ill from cancer for some time.
