= Phil Daley =

Australian international rugby league footballer

Personal information
- Full name: Phillip Daley
- Born: 1 April 1964 (age 62)

Playing information
- Position: Prop
Club
Years	Team	Pld	T	G	FG	P
1985–89	Manly-Warringah	106	1	0	0	4
1990–91	Gold Coast	20	0	0	0	0
	Total	126	1	0	0	4
Representative
Years	Team	Pld	T	G	FG	P
1986–88	Australia	3	0	0	0	0
1987–88	New South Wales	3	0	0	0	0
- Father: Doug Daley
- Relatives: Ben Daley (son)

Phil Daley (born 1 April 1964) is an Australian former premiership-winning and representative rugby league footballer who played in the 1980s and 1990s. His club career was played with the Manly-Warringah Sea Eagles and the Gold Coast. His position of choice was at prop forward.

== Club career ==
A Manly junior, Daley played for New South Wales schoolboys and for Sydney, New South Wales and Australia in under-18 representative sides. He was graded by Manly in 1983 and debuted in first grade in 1985.

After breaking his jaw in the State of Origin exhibition game in Los Angeles in 1987, Daley spent five weeks on the sidelines as Manly made their charge towards the Grand Final. He returned in time for the major semi-final against Eastern Suburbs, and after having his jaw tested early by some punishing Roosters defense, his confidence rose and Manly were on their way to the Grand Final with a 10–6 win. Two weeks later he played in Manly's victorious Grand Final team which defeated the Canberra Raiders 18–8 in the last Grand Final played at the Sydney Cricket Ground.

Following the grand final victory he traveled with Manly to England for the 1987 World Club Challenge against their champions, Wigan. In a tryless game at the Central Park ground in Wigan, the English champions defeated Manly 8–2 in front of a reported crowd of 36,895, though many in attendance still believe the actual crowd figure was around 50,000.

Daley left Manly after the difficult 1989 season and played 19 games for the Gold Coast in 1990 and 1991. He returned to Manly for some lower grade games in 1992, but never made it back to first grade and retired that year after 106 appearances for the club.

== Representative career ==
Daley was selected for the 1986 Kangaroo tour and played in seven minor tour matches, but did not appear in any of the tours six tests. Other Manly players selected for the 1986 tour were Noel Cleal, Des Hasler and Dale Shearer. He played in three State of Origin matches for New South Wales including the 1987 Exhibition Game in Los Angeles in which he fractured his jaw.

In Origin Game 2 of the 1988 State of Origin series, Daley sparked an uproar at Brisbane's Lang Park when he was sin-binned for a dangerous high-tackle on Queensland Hooker Greg Conescu. Maroons captain Wally Lewis ran about 10 metres to stop Daley's punches on Conescu, and an all-in brawl ensued. Referee Mick Stone (from NSW) sin-binned Daley and Conescu for 10 minutes each, while Lewis was sent for 5 minutes for dissent and for being the 3rd player involved. Hundreds of beer cans were hurled onto the ground by irate Queensland fans in support of their captain. It was the last time Daley represented New South Wales as, a few days before Game 3 at the Sydney Football Stadium, Daley was sacked from the team because he broke team curfew rules when he left the Origin camp to visit his pregnant wife. He was replaced by Steve Hanson.

Daley represented for Australia at Test level in the first and second Tests of the 1988 Ashes series against the touring Great Britain Lions (coached by former Manly premiership player Mal Reilly, and featuring Daley's 1987 Grand Final front row partner Kevin Ward). He was also selected later that year for the one-off Test against Papua New Guinea in Wagga Wagga which saw a 70–8 win for Australia, but missed a place in the Kangaroos team that defeated New Zealand 25–12 in the 1988 World Cup Final played at Eden Park in Auckland.

== Footballing family ==
Daley is the son of Doug Daley, a former Manly-Warringah player as well as the treasurer and secretary of the club. Phil Daley's son, Ben plays rugby union for the Queensland Reds.
