= Steve Hanson =

Australian rugby league footballer (1961–2015)

Personal information
- Full name: Stephen Raymond Hanson
- Born: 7 August 1961 Bowral, New South Wales, Australia
- Died: 4 November 2015 (aged 54) Sydney, New South Wales, Australia

Playing information
- Position: Prop
Club
Years	Team	Pld	T	G	FG	P
1985–90	North Sydney Bears	88	4	0	0	16
1992–93	Eastern Suburbs	22	2	0	0	8
	Total	110	6	0	0	24
Representative
Years	Team	Pld	T	G	FG	P
1988	New South Wales	1	1	0	0	4

Stephen Raymond Hanson (7 August 1961 – 4 November 2015) was an Australian professional rugby league footballer in the New South Wales Rugby League (NSWRL) competition. He played for the North Sydney Bears and Eastern Suburbs. Hanson primarily played in the front row.

Hanson was selected to represent New South Wales as a last minute replacement for Phil Daley in game III of the 1988 State of Origin series. He scored a try in the match which would be his only State of Origin appearance.

On 4 November 2015, he died of complications of heart attack he had suffered two weeks earlier, while holidaying. He was 54.

== Sources ==
- Alan Whiticker & Glen Hudson (2007). The Encyclopedia of Rugby League Players. Wetherill Park, New South Wales: Gary Allen Pty Ltd. ISBN 978-1-877082-93-1.
