= Jonathan Docking =

Australian rugby league footballer

Personal information
- Full name: Jonathan Docking
- Born: 21 January 1964 (age 62) Sydney, New South Wales, Australia

Playing information
- Height: 172 cm (5 ft 8 in)
- Weight: 75.5 kg (11 st 12 lb)
- Position: Fullback
Club
Years	Team	Pld	T	G	FG	P
1984–91	Cronulla-Sutherland	161	57	0	0	228
Representative
Years	Team	Pld	T	G	FG	P
1987–89	NSW City	3	1	0	0	4
1987–88	New South Wales	2	1	0	0	4

Jonathan Docking (born 21 January 1964) is an Australian former professional rugby league footballer who played in the 1980s and 1990s.

== Playing career ==
A Cronulla junior, Docking played for the Sharks for eight seasons between 1984 and 1991, debuting as a 20-year-old. He played over 160 first grade games and scored 57 first grade tries during his career.

Docking played his junior career as a halfback, where he was given a scholarship to the Sharks as a schoolboy in 1982. However, Docking was soon shifted by Cronulla to the fullback position where he would develop into one of the club's mainstays from the day he led Cronulla to a victory over three-time premiers Parramatta in his fourth appearance in first grade. Docking was alongside Gary Belcher and Garry Jack the best broken-field runner in the Winfield Cup for most of his career, with a highlight being his brilliant display against the Brisbane Broncos in a play-off for fifth in 1989.

Docking was chosen to represent New South Wales in one match during each of the State of Origin series of 1987 and 1988. However, at the close of the 1991 season, Docking was told by the Sharks that his services were no longer required due to the club's financial problems, and although he was only 28, no other Winfield Cup club sought Docking's services for 1992.
