= Doug Daley =

Australian rugby league footballer and administrator

Personal information
- Full name: Douglas Joseph Daley
- Born: 16 September 1933 Alstonville, New South Wales, Australia
- Died: 22 March 1994 (aged 60) Sydney, New South Wales, Australia

Playing information
- Position: Second-row
Club
Years	Team	Pld	T	G	FG	P
1955–61	Manly-Warringah	63	7	0	0	21
- Source: As of 5 April 2019
- Relatives: Phil Daley (son)

Douglas Joseph Daley (1933–1994) was an Australian rugby league player and administrator.

== Playing career ==
Daley was originally from Alstonville, New South Wales and came to the Manly-Warringah Sea Eagles in 1955. He went on to play seven seasons with the club between 1955 and 1961, mainly as a second-row forward. Daley played in the 1957 Grand Final loss to St George Dragons.

== Post playing ==
After his playing career was over, he went into club administration, firstly as treasurer of the Manly club between 1969 and 1984, and then he was promoted to club secretary in 1985. He was elevated to the position of CEO at Manly-Warringah Sea Eagles between 1987 and 1992. He was the father of the rugby league footballer; Phil Daley.

== Death ==
Daley died on 22 March 1994, aged 60, after a long battle with cancer.
