= Roger Palisses =

France international rugby league footballer & coach

Personal information
- Born: 19 January 1961 (age 64); Pyrénées-Orientales, Occitania, France

Playing information
- Position: Centre, Wing
Club
Years	Team	Pld	T	G	FG	P
1980–81	XIII Catalan
1981–93	AS Saint-Estève
	Total	0	0	0	0	0
Representative
Years	Team	Pld	T	G	FG	P
1984–91	France	11	0	0	0	0

Roger Palisses (born 16 January 1961) is a French former rugby league player and coach. He played as centre or as wing.

== Career ==
Formed in both rugby codes, rugby union and rugby league, he concluded his formation with the latter for XIII Catalan, with which he disputed his first senior matches. Outshined by the competition, he decided to join the nearby club Saint-Estève, which he did for the rest of his career. He won the French Championship in 1989, 1990 and 1993 as well the Lord Derby Cup in 1987 and 1993. Due to his club performances, he is selected several times for the French national team between 1984 and 1991.

After the end of his playing career, he also became the coach of Saint-Estève with the same success as he also won the French Championship title in 1997 and the Lord Derby Cup in 1994 and 1995. He was also the co-director of the France national teams between 1994 and 2000 alongside Hervé Guiraud.

== Honours ==
=== As a player ===
- Team honours:
  - Winner of the French Championship: 1989, 1990 et 1993 (Saint-Estève).
  - Winner of the Lord Derby Cup: 1987 et 1993 (Saint-Estève).
  - Runner-up at the French Championship : 1982 et 1992 (Saint-Estève).
  - Runner-up at the Lord Derby Cup : 1986, 1988 et 1990 (Saint-Estève).

=== As a coach ===
- Team honours:
  - Winner of the French Championship : 1997 (Saint-Estève).
  - Winner of the Lord Derby Cup: 1994 and 1995 (Saint-Estève)
  - Runner-up at the French Championship: 1995 and 1996 (Saint-Estève)
