= Les Davidson =

Australia international rugby league footballer

Personal information
- Full name: Les Davidson
- Born: 3 April 1963 (age 63) Dubbo, New South Wales, Australia
- Height: 188 cm (6 ft 2 in)
- Weight: 94 kg (14 st 11 lb)

Playing information
- Position: Prop, Second-row
Club
Years	Team	Pld	T	G	FG	P
1984–90	South Sydney	113	5	0	0	20
1988–89	Warrington	22	4	0	0	16
1989–90	Wigan	11	2	0	0	8
1991–98	Cronulla-Sutherland	133	13	0	0	52
	Total	279	24	0	0	96
Representative
Years	Team	Pld	T	G	FG	P
1986–87	Australia	4	0	0	0	0
1987–88	New South Wales	5	1	0	0	4

Les Davidson (born 3 April 1963) is an Australian former professional rugby league footballer who played in the 1980s and 1990s. He played for the South Sydney Rabbitohs and Cronulla-Sutherland Sharks and represented at both the State and national levels. His position of choice on the field was second-row or prop.

== Playing career ==
Davidson made his first grade début for the South Sydney Rabbitohs in 1985. At the end of the 1986 NSWRL season, he became the first South Sydney player in over a decade to be selected for Australia when he went on the 1986 Kangaroo tour of Great Britain and France. He played five State of Origin matches for New South Wales and was named Man of the match in Game 1, 1987.

Davidson was a member of the New South Wales Origin squad which played Queensland at Veterans Stadium, Long Beach, California on 6 August 1987. Davidson also represented Australia in a number of Test Matches. He is listed on the Australian Players Register as Kangaroo No. 577.

In the Australian off-season of 1988 and 1989, Davidson had two stints in England playing for the Warrington Wolves and Wigan Warriors.

After very nearly joining the Brisbane Broncos, Davidson signed with Cronulla-Sutherland. He made 133 appearances in first grade for the Sharks, adding hardened representative experience to the Cronulla pack during the 1990s, and he became a Sharks favourite.
