= Chris Preece =

Rugby league player

Personal information
- Full name: Christopher Preece

Playing information
- Position: Hooker
Club
| Years | Team | Pld | T | G | FG | P |
|---|---|---|---|---|---|---|
| 1983 | Blackpool Borough | 1 | 1 | 0 | 0 | 3 |
| 1983–86 | Bradford Northern | 16 | 4 | 0 | 0 | 16 |
| 1986 | Halifax | 6 | 2 | 0 | 0 | 8 |
| | Total | 23 | 7 | 0 | 0 | 27 |
Representative
| Years | Team | Pld | T | G | FG | P |
| 1984 | Wales | 1 |

Christopher Preece (birth unknown) is a former professional rugby league footballer who played in the 1980s. He played at representative level for Wales, and at club level for Bradford Northern, as a hooker.

== Playing career ==
=== Club career ===
Preece was signed by Bradford Northern from Salford Colts in November 1983. He joined Halifax in October 1986.

In 1990, he signed a contract with French club, Palau.

=== International honours ===
Preece won a cap for Wales while at Bradford Northern in the 28–9 defeat by England at Eugene Cross Park, Ebbw Vale on Sunday 14 October 1984.
