= Mark McGaw =

Australia international rugby league footballer

Personal information
- Born: 17 May 1964 (age 62) Cronulla, New South Wales, Australia

Playing information
- Height: 188 cm (6 ft 2 in)
- Weight: 93 kg (14 st 9 lb)
- Position: Centre, Wing
Club
Years	Team	Pld	T	G	FG	P
1984–92	Cronulla-Sutherland	158	35	0	0	140
1986–87	Leeds	16	6	0	0	24
1993	Penrith Panthers	16	3	0	0	12
1994–95	South Sydney	22	3	0	0	12
	Total	212	47	0	0	188
Representative
Years	Team	Pld	T	G	FG	P
1987–91	New South Wales	13	6	0	0	24
1988–91	Australia	3	4	0	0	16

Mark McGaw (born 17 May 1964) is an Australian former professional rugby league footballer who played in the 1980s and 1990s. Nicknamed Sparkles, he achieved national and state representative honors in the sport and following his retirement became one of the Gladiators in the Australian version of the TV show. McGaw's usual position was at centre. McGaw also coached the North Sydney Bears’ S.G. Ball Cup team in 2016.

== Rugby league ==
McGaw played his club football for the Cronulla-Sutherland Sharks, Penrith Panthers and South Sydney Rabbitohs. Whilst guesting with English club Leeds, he played for them against the 1986 Kangaroo tourists. The following season, he played for the New South Wales Blues, appearing in all three games of the 1987 State of Origin series and scoring tries in Games I and III. His try in Game I came in the final seconds of the match, when McGaw chased a loose ball, desperately dived towards it and touched down centimetres inside the dead-ball line to clutch victory for New South Wales, making it one of the most iconic tries in State of Origin history. McGaw played at centre for the Blues in all three matches of the 1988 State of Origin series as well.

McGaw was selected to play at centre for Australia in their victory over New Zealand at the 1988 Rugby League World Cup final in Auckland. He is listed on the Australian Players Register as Kangaroo No. 590.

McGaw played at centre for New South Wales in all three matches of the 1990 State of Origin series, scoring tries in Games I and III. At the end of the 1990 NSWRL season, he went on the 1990 Kangaroo tour of Great Britain and France. In the first Test against Great Britain at Wembley Stadium, McGaw scored a remarkable solo try from half-way, outpacing or outmuscling six British defenders as he charged to the try-line. McGaw was selected to play for New South Wales in all three matches of the 1991 State of Origin series, scoring a try in Game II. At the end of the 1991 NSWRL season, he was selected to go on the 1991 Kangaroo tour of Papua New Guinea. The latter stages of his playing career were hampered by recurrent injuries. McGaw played for cross-town rivals Penrith Panthers for the 1993 NSWRL season. From 1994 to 1995, he played for the South Sydney Rabbitohs.

== Career after Rugby league ==
McGaw appeared as "Hammer" on the Australian version of the TV show Gladiators from 1995 to 1996, as well as joining other rugby league players such as Paul Vautin, Paul Sironen and Darryl Brohman in modeling for Lowes Menswear. In 2024 he returned to a refreshed season of Australian Gladiators, this time as the umpire. McGaw is founder of Mark McGaw Institute of Sports Science.

== Defamation case ==
On 2 November 2006, the Supreme Court of New South Wales awarded McGaw $385,000 for a defamatory story Today Tonight broadcast in June 2003. The Supreme Court jury found that the story made two defamatory imputations: that McGaw was "a man of dangerous domestic violence", and that he "bashed his lover so severely that she was hospitalized with horrific injuries".
