= Bruce Clark (rugby league) =

Australian rugby league footballer

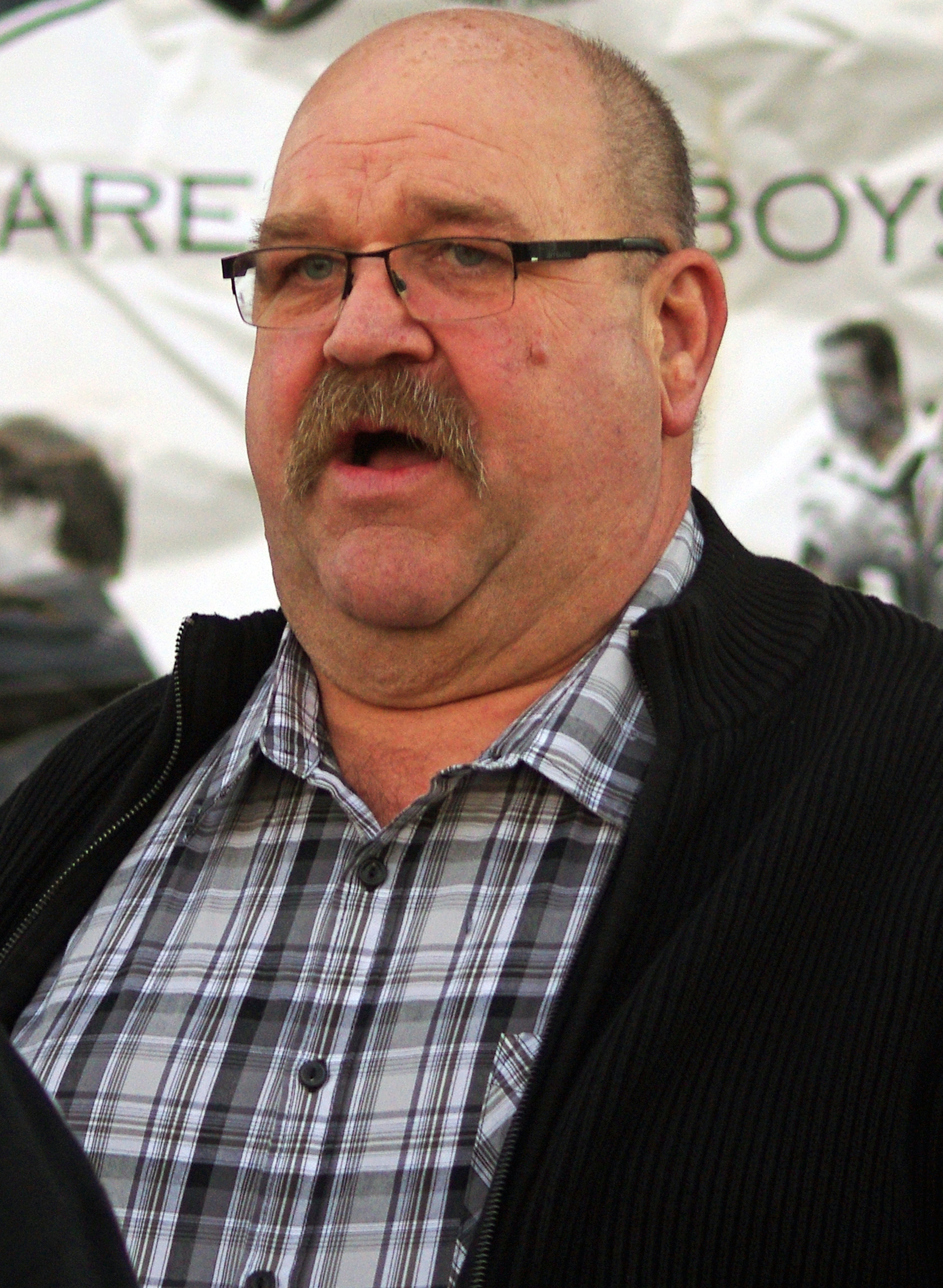

Personal information
- Full name: Bruce Wayne Clark
- Born: 13 November 1958 (age 68) Canterbury, New South Wales, Australia

Playing information
- Position: Prop
Club
Years	Team	Pld	T	G	FG	P
1979–87	Western Suburbs	65	3	0	0	12
1986–87	Oldham	28	4	0	0	16
	Total	93	7	0	0	28

Bruce Clark (born 13 November 1958) is an Australian former professional rugby league footballer who played first-grade for the Western Suburbs Magpies. He played as prop.

Clark joined English club Oldham during the 1986–87 season, and played in the 1986 Lancashire Cup final.
