= Julien Rascagnères =

French rugby league player (1945–2022)

Personal information
- Born: 20 March 1945 Perpignan, France
- Died: 19 September 2022 (aged 77) Cabestany, France

Playing information
- Position: Hooker, Loose forward
Club
Years	Team	Pld	T	G	FG	P
	XIII Catalan
	Pia
	Saint-Cyprien
	Total	0	0	0	0	0

Coaching information
Club
Years	Team	Gms	W	D	L	W%
	Saint-Cyprien

Refereeing information
Years	Competition	Apps
	Super League
1982–83	New South Wales Rugby League
1982–86	World Cup

Julien Rascagnères (20 March 1945 – 19 September 2022) was a French rugby league footballer who played as a hooker and loose forward. He then became a coach and a rugby league referee, officiating at both national and international levels.

Rascagnères refereed matches in the Super League and the New South Wales Rugby League. In 1982, he "refereed in a masterful way […] in front of a stadium packed to the brim with some 40,000 spectators".

Rascagnères refereed 9 games at international level, including two World Cup games. All of his tests involved Australia. He refereed the 1982 and 1986 Ashes series between Great Britain and Australia, as well as the 1985 Trans-Tasman Test series between Australia and New Zealand. Both the 1985 and the 1986 tests included games that doubled as the World Cup fixtures he refereed. Although not loved by British fans, especially after his last test at Central Park in Wigan in 1986 where he gave a contentious penalty try to Kangaroos winger Dale Shearer which all but ended Great Britain's chance to win its first test against Australia since 1978, he was generally regarded by some, including BBC TV commentator and former dual England rugby international Ray French, as one of the better French test referees of the 1980s and 1990s.

== Awards ==
- Winner of the Coupe de France Lord Derby with Pia (1975)
