= Peter Brown (rugby league) =

New Zealand rugby league footballer and agent

Personal information
- Full name: Peter Michael Gordon Brown
- Born: 1 September 1961 (age 65) Auckland, New Zealand

Playing information
- Position: Prop
Club
Years	Team	Pld	T	G	FG	P
1980–81	Te Atatu Roosters
1982	Mt Wellington
1983–91	Te Atatu Roosters	16	4	28	0	72
1983–85	Hunslet	10	1	11	0	25
1988–89	Salford	16	1	17	0	38
1989–90	Leigh	22	0	3	0	6
1990–91	Halifax	17	7	14	0	56
	Total	81	13	73	0	197
Representative
Years	Team	Pld	T	G	FG	P
	Auckland
1986–91	New Zealand	16	4	20	0	56

Peter Michael Gordon Brown (born 1 September 1961) is a New Zealand rugby league footballer agent and a former footballer who represented New Zealand. His position of preference was at prop.

== Playing career ==
Brown was a Te Atatu Roosters player in the Auckland Rugby League competition and also represented Auckland.

Brown also spent four off-seasons in England, playing for Hunslet, Salford, Halifax and Leigh.

He was first selected for the New Zealand national rugby league team in 1986 and went on to play in sixteen tests, with his final appearance being in 1991. He was part of the Kiwis squad that lost the final of the 1985-1988 World Cup to Australia.

=== County Cup Final appearances ===
Peter Brown played at prop and scored two conversions in Salford's 17-22 defeat by Wigan in the 1988 Lancashire Cup Final during the 1988–89 season at Knowsley Road, St. Helens on Sunday 23 October 1988.

== Later years ==
Brown is now a player agent, working alongside Frank Endacott.
