= Paul Langmack =

Australian rugby league player (1965–2026)

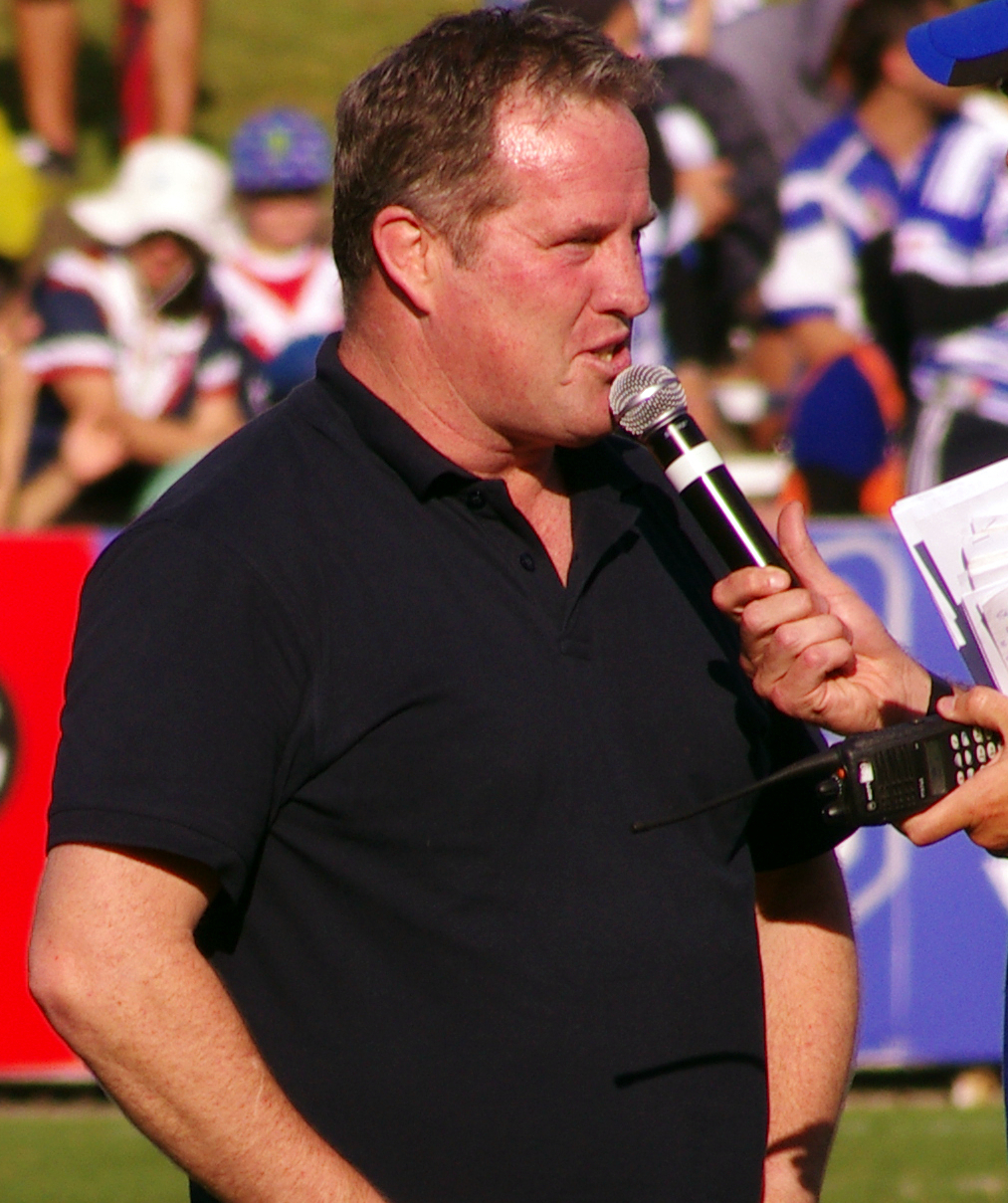
- Langmack in 2012

Personal information
- Born: 10 May 1965 Sydney, New South Wales, Australia
- Died: 5 November 2026 (aged 61) Sydney, New South Wales, Australia

Playing information
- Height: 183 cm (6 ft 0 in)
- Weight: 94 kg (14 st 11 lb)
- Position: Lock, Second-row, Five-eighth
Club
Years	Team	Pld	T	G	FG	P
1983–90	Canterbury Bulldogs	174	25	0	0	100
1984–85	Halifax	19	7	0	0	28
1991–98	Western Suburbs	137	18	0	0	72
1999	Sydney City	3	0	0	0	0
	Total	333	50	0	0	200
Representative
Years	Team	Pld	T	G	FG	P
1987	City Origin	1	0	0	0	0
1987–88	New South Wales	4	0	0	0	0

Coaching information
Club
Years	Team	Gms	W	D	L	W%
2003–04	South Sydney	35	5	1	29	14

Paul Langmack (10 May 1965 – 5 November 2026) was an Australian rugby league coach and representative and premiership-winning player. He won three premierships with the Canterbury-Bankstown Bulldogs in the mid to late 1980s. Langmack later joined the Western Suburbs Magpies to become just the fifth player to play 100 games with two different teams. He played 314 first grade games of NRL. Langmack was the younger brother of former Parramatta and Penrith footballer Peter Langmack.

== Playing career ==
While attending Patrician Brothers' College, Fairfield, Langmack captained the Australian Schoolboys team in 1982.

Langmack won three premierships as a member of the Canterbury-Bankstown Bulldogs in 1984, 1985 and 1988, and later played for and captained Western Suburbs. In 1987, he became the youngest player in history to register 100 top-grade games at the age of 22 years 26 days. Langmack was named Rugby League Week's player of the year in 1992. In 1999, former teammate Phil Gould brought Langmack to the Sydney City club. He played one final season – a season that didn't reach any great heights, as he only appeared in three first-grade matches.

== Coaching career ==
In 2002, he was a contender to replace Terry Lamb as the coach of the Wests Tigers and was reportedly the preferred candidate of senior players, including Terry Hill and Darren Senter. After the signing of Tim Sheens to the position, Langmack became assistant coach to Craig Coleman at the South Sydney Rabbitohs.

After Coleman was dramatically sacked immediately prior to the 2003 season, Langmack was installed as coach, but was unable to avoid the wooden spoon, winning just three games. After an unsuccessful start to the 2004 season, he was sacked and replaced by assistant Arthur Kitinas. Langmack's last season in charge of Souths was also marred by claims that Langmack was a racist by Souths player Owen Craigie.

== Death ==
Langmack died from a heart attack while attending a gym at Breakfast Point in Sydney’s Inner West on 5 November 2026, at the age of 61.
