= Gary Belcher =

Australia international rugby league footballer & broadcaster

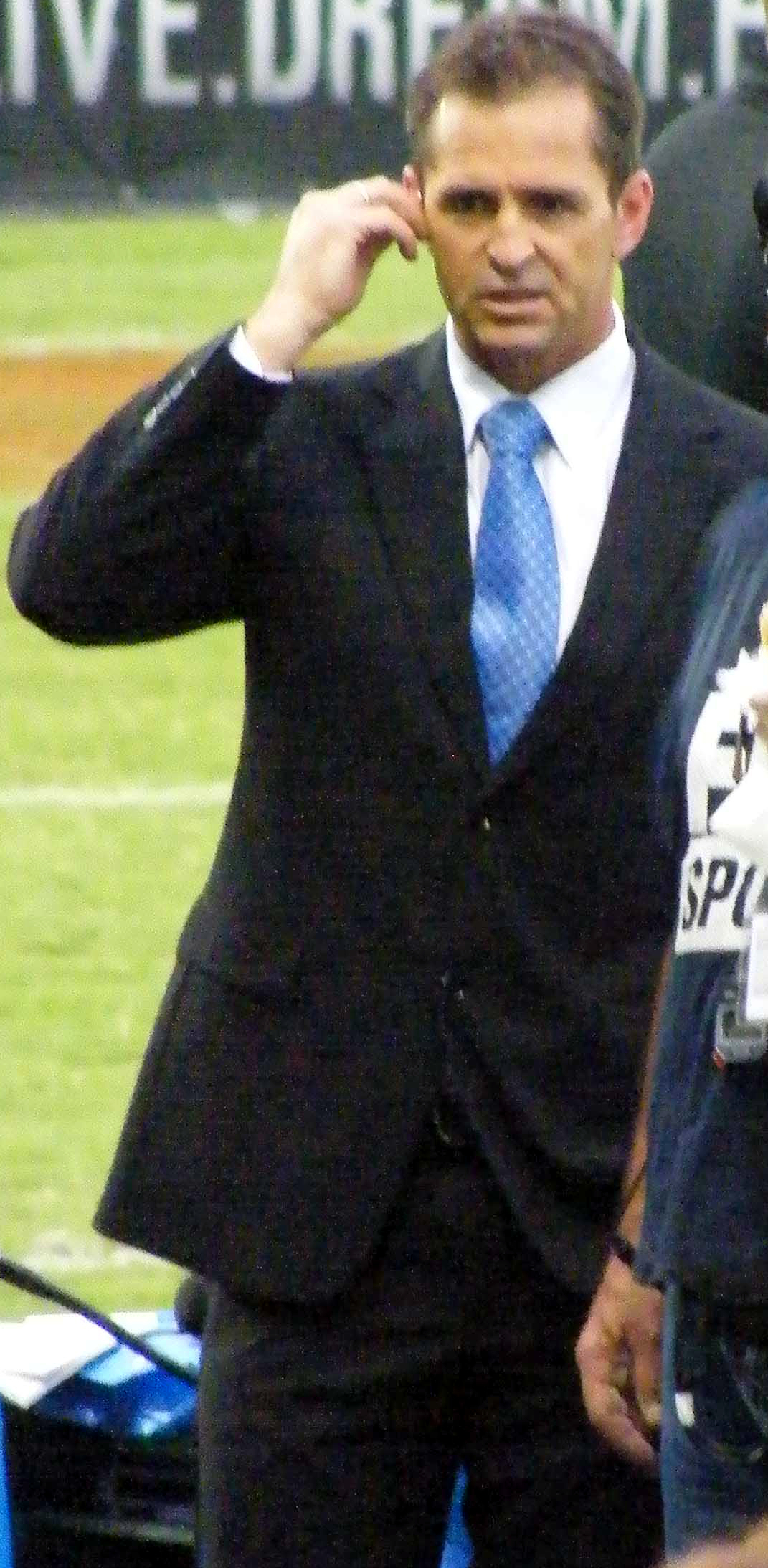

Personal information
- Born: 28 May 1962 (age 64) Brisbane, Queensland, Australia

Playing information
- Height: 183 cm (6 ft 0 in)
- Weight: 88 kg (13 st 12 lb)
- Position: Fullback
Club
Years	Team	Pld	T	G	FG	P
1982–85	Southern Suburbs	69	31	13	0	144
1986–93	Canberra Raiders	148	69	148	0	572
1988–89	Castleford	11	5	0	1	21
	Total	228	105	161	1	737
Representative
Years	Team	Pld	T	G	FG	P
1986–93	Queensland	16	4	16	0	48
1986–91	Australia	15	3	6	0	24

Gary Belcher (born 28 May 1962) is an Australian rugby league football commentator and former player. An Australian international and Queensland State of Origin representative, he played club football in the Brisbane Rugby League premiership for the Souths Magpies (winning the 1985 grand final) and in the NSWRL Premiership for the Canberra Raiders (winning the 1989 and 1990 grand finals). He also played in England for Castleford (Heritage No. 667). Belcher's position of choice was fullback, though he began his career in the centres.

== 1980s ==
Belcher in 1985 played for the Wayne Bennett coached Magpies in the 10-8 BRL grand final win over Wynnum Manly at Lang Park, alongside the centre pairing of Mal Meninga and Peter Jackson. In 1986 he and Meninga signed with the Canberra Raiders, making his début in Round 1 of the season against Manly-Warringah at Brookvale Oval. He also made his State of Origin début for Queensland in 1986, the first year the Maroons lost the series 3–0. Belcher had replaced long-serving Qld fullback Colin Scott.

He won the Raiders 1986 player of the year award and was also selected for the season-ending 1986 Kangaroo tour. However, as the understudy to incumbent fullback Garry Jack, he played no test matches on the tour, though he did play in ten matches on the tour scoring 6 tries. Early in the tour Belcher often joined the Channel 10 commentary team for games in which he did not play.

In 1987, Belcher again won the Raiders' player of the year award and played in the grand final against Manly-Warringah. Belcher kicked a goal to convert a late Chris O'Sullivan try, but the Raiders were defeated 18–8 in front of 50,201 in what was the last grand final played at the Sydney Cricket Ground.

In 1989, Belcher scored Canberra's first try in their dramatic 19–14 Grand Final victory over Balmain. The extra-time win securing the club its first premiership. A fortnight later, Belcher started in Canberra's first (and to date only) appearance in the World Club Challenge, which the Raiders would lose 30–18 to Widnes.

== 1990s ==
In 1990, Belcher was again at fullback for Canberra as they beat Penrith 18–14 in the Grand Final to secure back to back premierships.

Belcher was one of five Canberra players selected for the 1990 Kangaroo tour of Great Britain and France, and played in all three tests against Great Britain, with Australia winning the series 2–1. Belcher also played in the first test against France, scoring two tries in the comfortable 60–4 victory for Australia.

In 1991, Belcher played in his, and Canberra's, fourth Grand Final in five years, as Penrith beat Canberra 19–12.

Despite still being good enough to represent Queensland during the State of Origin series of 1993, a combination of injuries and salary cap constraints at the Raiders forced Belcher to announce his retirement at the end of that season.

== Post-playing career ==
Belcher spent time on the Brisbane Broncos coaching staff until a major cleanout by head coach Wayne Bennett at the end of 2005 saw him removed. He has been a commentator for Fox Sports coverage of NRL matches since sometime before 2007.

In 2017, he joined the Seven Network to call matches of the 2017 Rugby League World Cup.
