= Terry Lamb =

Australian rugby league footballer and coach

Terry Lamb OAM
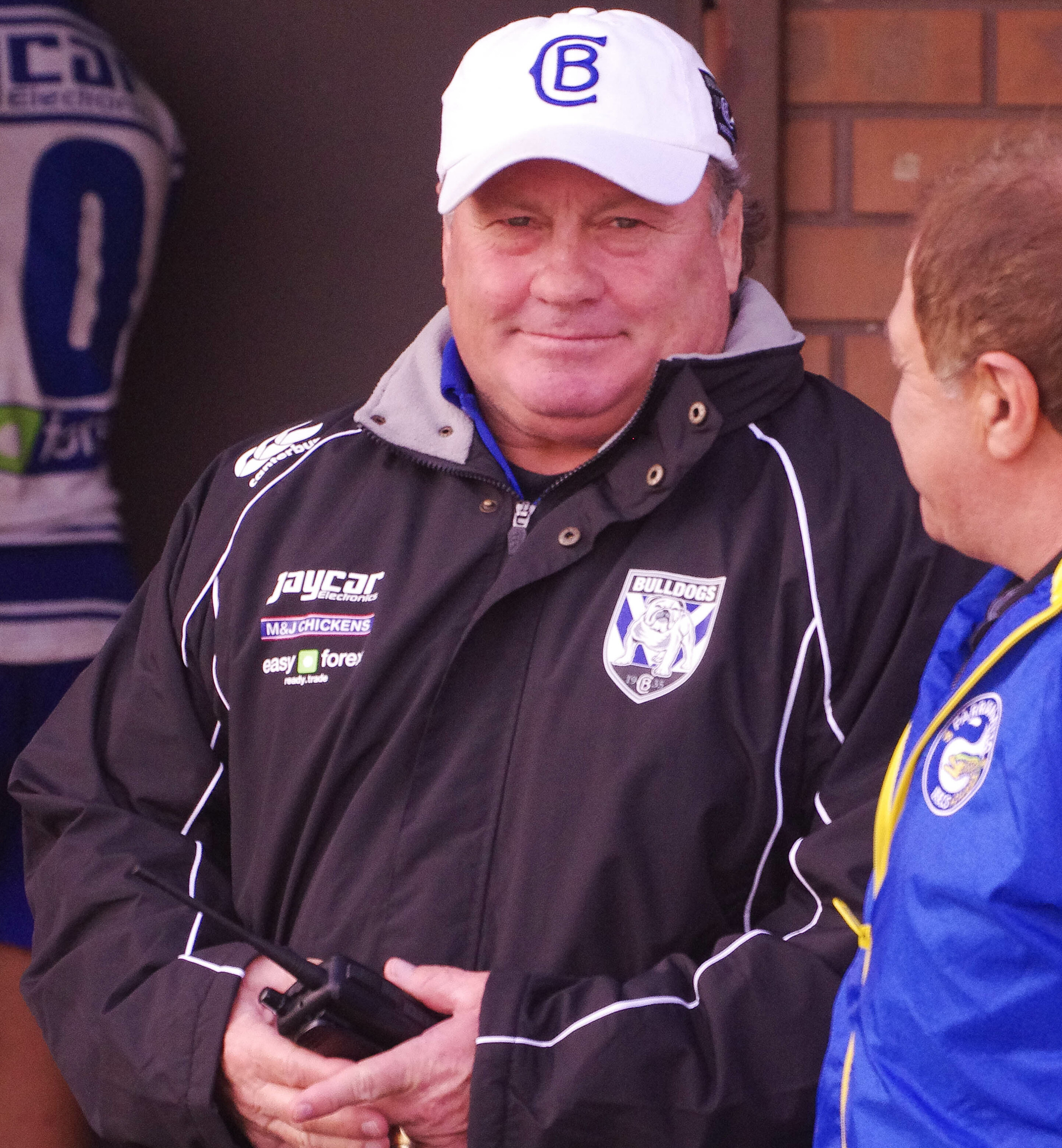

Personal information
- Full name: Terence John Lamb
- Born: 15 September 1961 (age 65) Sydney, New South Wales, Australia

Playing information
- Height: 166 cm (5 ft 5 in)
- Weight: 80 kg (12 st 8 lb)
- Position: Five-eighth, halfback
Club
Years	Team	Pld	T	G	FG	P
1980–83	Western Suburbs	88	41	11	7	163
1984–96	Canterbury-Bankstown	262	123	375	37	1279
	Total	350	164	386	44	1442
Representative
Years	Team	Pld	T	G	FG	P
1981–89	New South Wales	8	0	0	0	0
1986	Australia	7	0	0	0	0

Coaching information
Club
Years	Team	Gms	W	D	L	W%
2001–02	Wests Tigers	50	16	0	34	32

Terence John Lamb OAM (born 15 September 1961), also nicknamed "Baa", is an Australian former rugby league footballer and coach. He played 350 games, with the Western Suburbs (1980–1983) and Canterbury (1984–1996).

Lamb was known for his support of the ball-carrier - his ability to be in the right place at the right time netted him 164 tries. This earned him the moniker of "The Back-up Man". He also kicked 386 goals and 44 field goals, for 1,442 points in first grade. He played for New South Wales in State of Origin and Australia. Lamb is the only player to appear in every match of a Kangaroo Tour.

== Junior career ==
Lamb grew up in Chester Hill, a suburb in the Bankstown area and attended Sefton High School. He only played in one Grand Final when he filled in for a side above his age group. Lamb is the only International to come from the Chester Hill Hornets club and the ground is now named the Terry Lamb Complex in his honour. He represented Canterbury in junior representative sides, but signed his first professional contract with Western Suburbs Magpies.

== Western Suburbs Magpies career ==
On 18 May 1980, Lamb made his first grade premiership debut for Western Suburbs against Balmain Tigers at Lidcombe Oval. Lamb scored two tries in the Magpies' comprehensive 26-4 victory. He scored 9 tries in his debut season and was edged out for the inaugural Dally M Rookie of the Year award by teammate Jim Leis who would go on the Australian 1980 Tour of New Zealand.

Lamb's form in the early stages of the 1981 season was outstanding and he was selected in the NSW State of Origin side. NSW coach Ted Glossop initially wanted to move Steve Rogers from the centres to five-eighth and play whoever the league gave him as a replacement back from the bench but was overruled by the NSWRL. Lamb met his halves partner, young Parramatta halfback Peter Sterling, for the first time only two hours before kickoff. He made his Origin debut at Lang Park playing opposite another young player on the rise, Queensland captain Wally Lewis who had made his test debut against France only a few weeks earlier. NSW led 15–5 at half time mostly due to the Parramatta connection of Sterling, Ray Price, Michael Cronin and Eric Grothe who picked up a loose Greg Conescu pass to race 90 metres to score. But the Maroons, led by Lewis and man of the match Chris Close, came back strong in the second half to win 22–15.

The 1982 season was a successful one for Wests and Lamb where Lamb's end of season form caught the eyes of the Australian selectors and he was selected for the 1982 Kangaroo tour. He ruled himself out of the tour as he already planned to marry his partner Kim. The Kangaroos swept all before them on the tour going through undefeated for the first time and becoming known as "The Invincibles".

Lamb's final season with Wests was in 1983 where the Magpies won the wooden spoon prize. In spite of this, he was awarded the Dally M Player of the Year Award.

Lamb made 88 appearances for Wests. He was later named as halfback in the Western Suburbs Magpies Team of the Eighties.

== Joining the Bulldogs and early success ==
The news that Lamb's Dally M winnings was more than his contract ensured that he would be in hot demand from the richer Sydney clubs now that he was out of contract and that Wests were at first expelled from the premiership. Easts and Balmain both showed interest but eventually Lamb chose the Bulldogs, joining in 1984.

Lamb settled nicely into Canterbury under the coaching of Warren Ryan and playing outside Steve Mortimer. Lamb's arrival did cause initial controversy when long-serving five-eighth Garry Hughes was dropped to reserve grade in what was to be his final season. Lamb's ability to back up the ball-carrier came to the fore as he was the Sydney Premiership's joint leading tryscorer with 17. Lamb won a recall to the New South Wales State of Origin side for the 2nd match. He played well enough to be retained for the 3rd match despite the Blues losing, but withdrew due to injury. Lamb never won a junior premiership and he was closing in on one at senior level when the Bulldogs made the 1984 Grand Final against arch-rivals Parramatta Eels who were looking to win their fourth successive title. Canterbury took out the Grand Final 6–4 in a bruising game of football. Lamb was replaced with five minutes remaining due to a nasty gash above his eye.

In 1985, Lamb played 22 games for the Bulldogs, but was forced to miss the 1985 Grand Final due to a groin injury. Michael Hagan was named as his replacement. Canterbury defeated St. George Dragons 7–6 to make it back-to-back titles.

1986 was an eventful year for Lamb. He played much of the opening rounds at halfback with captain Steve Mortimer suspended, and was recalled to the New South Wales State of Origin side. He was selected in all three matches from the bench and went on to be selected in the Australian Test side for the opening match against New Zealand. Lamb came on from the bench as a replacement for Dale Shearer. Lamb got more time in the 3rd Test when he came as a replacement for the injured Wayne Pearce playing lock forward. His good form at Canterbury continued with the Bulldogs making a third successive Grand Final, once again playing Parramatta Eels. Lamb was the leading pointscorer for the season, and he would end up scoring 210 points. However, he missed a difficult penalty goal attempt in the final three minutes of the 1986 Grand Final. The Eels won 4–2. Lamb was then selected to go on the Kangaroo Tour.

In March 1987, Lamb scored all of Canterbury's 26 points as they beat Wests 26–16 in round 4. Lamb's points haul were made up of four tries and five goals. He again finished the season as the leagues leading try-scorer however, the club failed to make the finals, finishing 6th in what would prove to be Warren Ryan's last season as coach.

Warren Ryan departed Canterbury at the end of 1987 with reserve grade coach Phil Gould taking over the reins in a caretaker role with Chris Anderson being groomed for the top position.

== Hanley incident and the World Cup ==
Canterbury played the 1988 Grand Final against Balmain, a game which the Bulldogs won 24–12. As well as scoring a try, Lamb was involved in a first-half tackle, along with Andrew Farrar, which resulted in the concussion of influential Balmain star, Ellery Hanley. Hanley was sent to the head bin, and although he managed to return to the field before half-time, he did not appear fully aware of his surroundings, and was replaced at half-time. Lamb says that there was no malice, and Hanley was not deliberately targeted.

== Captain of the Bulldogs ==
One of the first jobs that new coach Chris Anderson did was appoint Lamb as captain ahead of Paul Langmack and Andrew Farrar, who were commonly the deputies when Peter Tunks (who joined Penrith Panthers in 1990) was unavailable.

The Bulldogs lost Paul Langmack, Andrew Farrar, David Gillespie and Joe Thomas to Wests under former dual premiership-winning coach Warren Ryan. The club also lost Paul Dunn to Penrith and Jason Alchin to St George.

A chronic groin injury would dog Lamb for the next few seasons. Lamb would be a week-to-week proposition throughout the 1990s.

Despite the departures from Canterbury at the end of the season, in 1991 they qualified in equal 5th position but went down 19–14 against arch-rivals Wests. The club under the leadership of Lamb developed as a competitive force. Lamb was captain to a new generation of players coming through the club who would play a big part in the club's successful years ahead including Darren Smith, Dean Pay, Simon Gillies, Matthew Ryan and 1991 Rothmans Medal Winner Ewan McGrady.

Lamb missed the first five matches in 1992 but when he returned he enjoyed one of his finest individual seasons where Canterbury started to be tagged a 'one-man team'. Lamb lifted the Bulldogs to the brink of the semi-finals before once again making himself unavailable as the 1992 World Cup loomed. Lamb came 2nd in the Dally M Awards for 1992.

A new wave of signings joined the Bulldogs in 1993 and the team that Lamb and Anderson moulded was coming to fruition. The Bulldogs won the Minor Premiership with Lamb making it a hat-trick of Dally M Five-Eighth of the Year awards and Anderson winning Dally M Coach of the Year. Canterbury crashed out in the semi-finals but it was a great effort by the club to get to a position of strength after being warm favourites for the 1991 Wooden Spoon.

Lamb broke his arm in 1994 when playing his 299th first grade match against Wests. Lamb would return to play his 300th match against Souths playing at Concord Oval and wearing the No.55 jumper. Concord was only used for three League games and Lamb wore No.55 as he was a late inclusion into the side. Lamb broke the record previously held by Geoff Gerard in the final round, which ironically was against his former club Wests at Campbelltown with both Canterbury and Wests jointly celebrating the occasion. Canterbury with their victory in Lamb's 304th first grade game won the Minor Premiership and defeated Canberra in the Major Semi-Final. The Raiders however won the Grand Final 36–12.

== 1995 Grand Final ==
The 1995 season was to be Lamb's last season and the Bulldogs were keen to send him out a winner but it all went wrong early when the Bulldogs were caught up in the firing line of the Super League War. Lamb's strength and character as a captain shone through when he held the club together and rallied everyone (bar one) in the latter half of the season. Canterbury qualified in 6th position for the ARL Finals Series. The Bulldogs defeated St George, Brisbane and defending premiers Canberra to make the Grand Final against Manly.

Canterbury were never troubled in the Grand Final defeating Manly 17–4 in the decider with Lamb potting a crucial drop-goal to give them a seven-point lead. Lamb spent 10 minutes in the sin bin, but that didn't stop his performance as he steered Canterbury to an impressive victory.

The 1995 ARL Grand Final was also the swansong for Chief Executive Peter Moore who retired from his post after 26 years of service.

Lamb's planned retirement was shelved as he helped his beloved club for one more season to get through a sudden player departure caused by the Super League War. Lamb didn't seek the captaincy with Simon Gillies taking on that role and when Gillies was injured for the second half of the season, Lamb again opted not to be captain with Darren Britt taking the reins (in a sign of things to come). Lamb's career wound down on 25 August 1996, when Canterbury defeated North Queensland 50–22 at Belmore Sports Ground. Lamb scored two tries in his final game, just as he had done in his first game 16 years earlier.

Lamb played a record 350 first grade games (88 at Western Suburbs, 262 at Canterbury-Bankstown). He also scored 164 first grade tries, a mark bettered only by Andrew Ettingshausen (165), Steve Menzies (180) and Ken Irvine (212).

In a strange twist, with Manly having reached (and won) the 2008 NRL Grand Final, Menzies ended his career in Australia having equalled Lamb's league record of 349 games in his last match. The 34-year-old veteran of 15 NRL seasons then signed a contract to play the 2009 season and beyond with Super League club, the Bradford Bulls.

In anticipation of equalling Lamb's record with his final appearance, Manly was reported to have made Menzies an offer to make a cameo appearance in 2009 to break the record. Menzies' response confirmed his and Lamb's standing among the greats:

"I wouldn't consider coming back for one game and cheapening the record or anything," said Menzies.

"If I fell one short or equalled it or whatever then that's my career and the way it finishes.

"(Lamb) was such a great player ... I'm very honoured to stand next to him. Lamb set many records at Canterbury with the last one, a landmark of 123 tries being broken by winger Hazem El Masri, against the Newcastle Knights in 2006.

Lamb would be acknowledged in 2004 as the Canterbury five-eighth and captain in their 70-years greatest side.

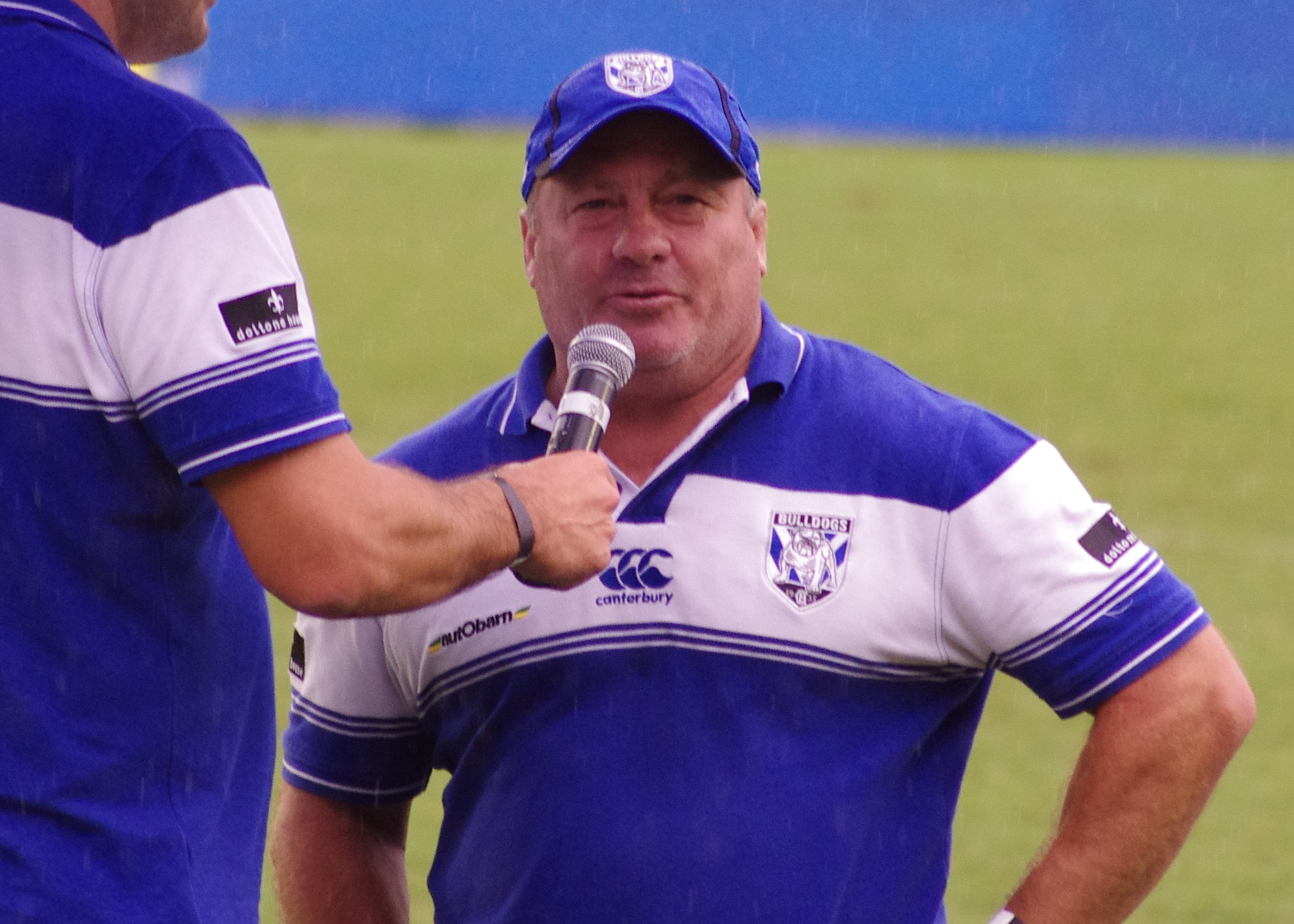
Lamb in 2012

== Achievements and honours ==
- 1983 Dally M Player of the Year (1st Runner Up in 1984, 1987, 1992. 2nd Runner Up in 1986)
- 1984 Rothmans Medal Best & Fairest Winner
- Three times winner of the Dally M Players Player of the Year (1984, 1986, 1995)
- Record seven times Dally M Five-Eighth of the Year Award (1983, 1984, 1986, 1987, 1991, 1992, 1993)
- Won a record total of 18 Dally M Awards.
- NSWRL Premiership Leading Tryscorer in 1984 (17) and 1987 (16)
- NSWRL Premiership Leading Pointscorer in 1986 (210)
- Member of 1984, 1988 and 1995 Canterbury Premiership Winning Teams
- 1995 Canterbury Premiership Winning Captain
- Only player to play every match on a full Kangaroo Tour. Lamb played in all 20 matches: 15 tour matches and 5 Tests on the 1986 Tour of Great Britain and France.
- Leading Tryscoring with 19 on Australia's 1986 Kangaroo Tour
- Member of Australia's successful 1988 World Cup final Squad
- Played in NSW's first State of Origin cleansweep in 1986
- Scored two tries in his first Premiership match playing for Wests against Balmain in 1980 and his last Premiership match playing for Canterbury against North Queensland in 1996
- Awarded keys to City of Canterbury, New South Wales in 1995 along with Peter Moore
- Awarded an Order of Australia (OAM) for services to rugby league
- Australian Sports Medal recipient, 24 October 2000.
- In February 2008, Lamb was named in the list of Australia's 100 Greatest Players (1908–2007) which was commissioned by the NRL and ARL to celebrate the code's centenary year in Australia.

== See also ==
- List of players who have played 300 NRL games
