= Paul Dunn (rugby league) =

Australia international rugby league footballer

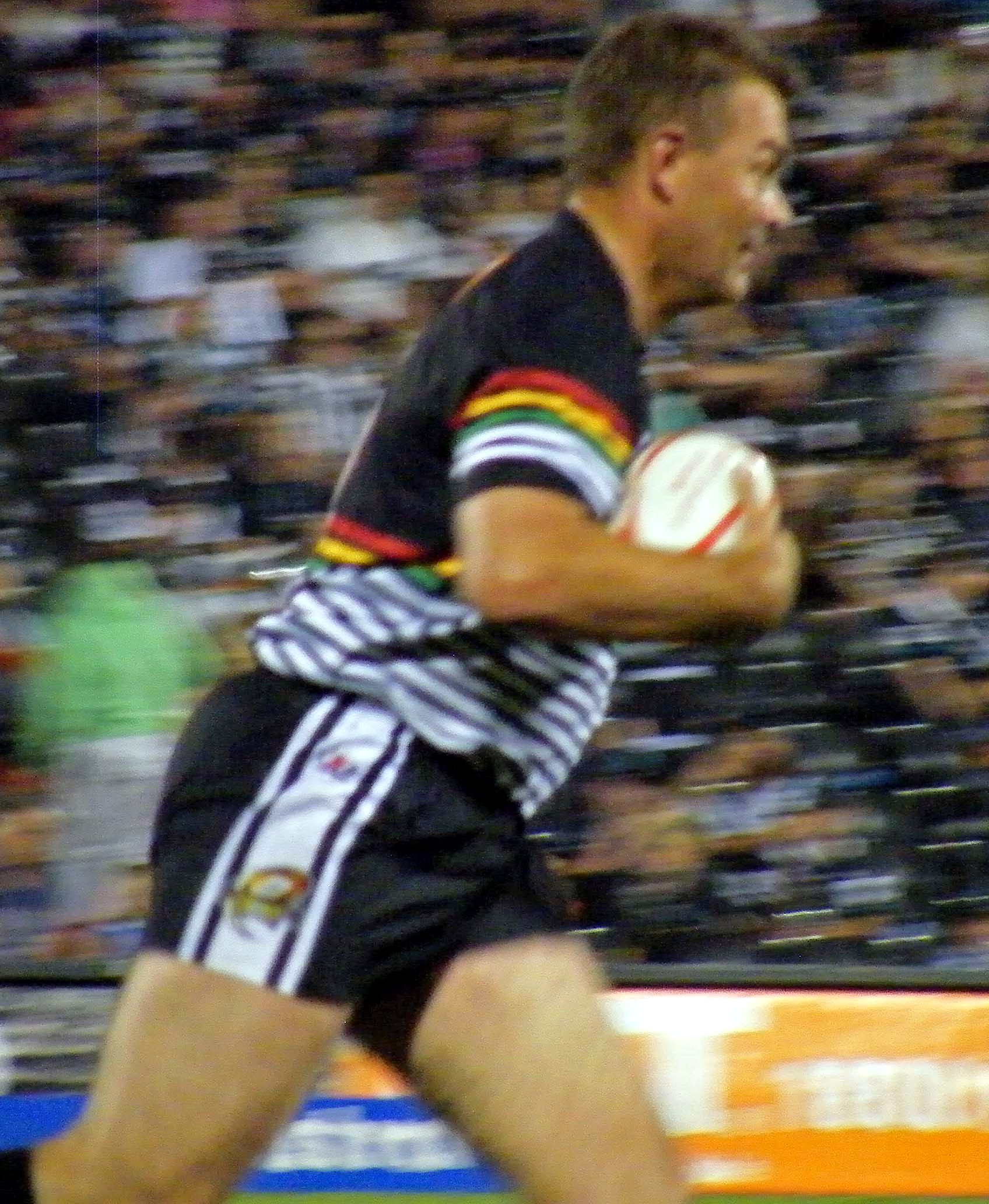

Personal information
- Full name: Paul Anthony Dunn
- Born: 7 August 1963 (age 63) Molong, New South Wales, Australia

Playing information
- Height: 189 cm (6 ft 2 1/2 in)
- Position: Prop
Club
Years	Team	Pld	T	G	FG	P
1984–85	Eastern Suburbs	36	2	0	0	8
1986–90	Canterbury Bulldogs	100	5	0	0	20
1991–92	Penrith Panthers	34	0	0	0	0
1993–95	Parramatta Eels	60	1	0	0	4
1996	Sydney City Roosters	24	1	0	0	4
	Total	254	9	0	0	36
Representative
Years	Team	Pld	T	G	FG	P
1986–88	Australia	12	0	0	0	0
1988–89	New South Wales	3	0	0	0	0
1988–91	NSW Country	3	0	0	0	0
1985–86	NSW City	2	0	0	0	0

Paul Dunn (born 7 August 1963) is an Australian former professional rugby league footballer who played in the 1980s and 1990s. A New South Wales State of Origin and Australian international representative forward, he played club football in Sydney for Eastern Suburbs, Canterbury-Bankstown, Parramatta and Penrith.

== Background ==
Dunn was born in the small town of Molong in central-west New South Wales. He later grew up in both Orange and Bathurst. Dunn moved to Sydney at the age of 19, where he played one season with Bondi United.

== Professional playing career ==
In 1983, Dunn began his first-grade career in the NSWRL premiership with Sydney's Eastern Suburbs club, where he played for two years before moving to the Canterbury-Bankstown Bulldogs, playing 100 games for the club over five seasons. At the end of the 1986 NSWRL season, he was selected to represent his country on the Kangaroo tour. A major player and staff change at Canterbury prompted a move to the Penrith Panthers in 1991, where Dunn spent two years before moving to the Parramatta Eels. He retired at the end of 1995 before returning for one year to his first club, the newly re-branded Sydney City Roosters.

In 1988, Dunn was the recipient of the Clive Churchill Medal for his man-of-the-match performance at prop in the Grand Final-winning Canterbury team. Dunn also won another premiership with Penrith in 1991. Following this grand final victory, he travelled with the Panthers to England for the 1991 World Club Challenge which was lost to Wigan.

Dunn also played in the City Firsts side in 1985 and 1986, and the City Origin side in 1987 and 1990, due to having played his last year of junior football for Bondi United, a Sydney-based club. He also played in the Country Origin sides of 1988, 1989 and 1991 because of his country roots. Dunn played one State of Origin game for New South Wales in 1988, and two games in 1989, along with seven Tests and five World Cup matches for Australia between 1986 and 1988, but found it hard to press for further representative honours in an era dominated by powerful forwards including Steve Roach, David Gillespie, Paul Harragon, Paul Sironen and John Cartwright.

== Post-playing career ==
In 2000, Dunn was awarded the Australian Sports Medal for his contribution to Australia's international standing in rugby league. Appointed the chief executive of the newly re-instituted South Sydney Rabbitohs, Dunn departed the club after its disappointing return season of 2002 due to unrest within the organisation. In 2008, Dunn was appointed to the club board of Canterbury-Bankstown. The following year, the Bulldogs reached the preliminary final after narrowly missing the minor premiership. In 2010, he was made deputy chairman of the club.
