= Garry Jack =

Australian RL coach and former Australia international rugby league footballer

Personal information
- Born: 14 March 1961 (age 65) Wollongong, New South Wales, Australia

Playing information
- Height: 178 cm (5 ft 10 in)
- Weight: 88 kg (13 st 12 lb)
- Position: Fullback
Club
Years	Team	Pld	T	G	FG	P
1980	Wests (Illawarra)	18	8			24
1981	Western Suburbs	5	1	0	0	3
1982–95	Balmain Tigers	244	60	1	1	232
1987–88	Salford City Reds	16	3	0	0	12
1992–93	Sheffield Eagles	33	8	1		33
1993–95	Salford City Reds	34	10	0	0	40
	Total	350	90	2	1	344
Representative
Years	Team	Pld	T	G	FG	P
1984–89	NSW	17	1	0	0	4
1984–88	Australia	22	11	0	0	44
1984–87	Country- City	4

Coaching information
Club
Years	Team	Gms	W	D	L	W%
1993–95	Salford	61	29	2	30	48

Garry Jack (born 14 March 1961) is an Australian former rugby league footballer and coach. He was a representative in the Australian national team and star player with the Balmain Tigers. Jack was a fullback for the Tigers during the late 1980s, and early 1990s, under the captaincy of Wayne Pearce and the coaching of Warren Ryan. Jack also represented the New South Wales State of Origin team on 17 occasions.

== Club career ==
Jack commenced his first grade career with Western Suburbs Magpies in 1981. The following year he moved to Balmain Tigers where he played for the rest of his Australian first grade career.

His association with English rugby league began at the end of the 1986 Kangaroo tour when he stayed on to play for Salford before returning to the Tigers. He was member of the consecutive Balmain teams which fell at the final hurdle to firstly Canterbury-Bankstown in the 1988 Grand Final and then to Canberra in 1989.

1991 saw the departure of Warren Ryan as Balmain coach and the arrival of former Wallaby coach, Alan Jones. The years playing under Jones at Balmain were unhappy ones for Jack and eventually after he had left the club in 1992, he launched an attack on Jones' ability as a coach following his 'surprise' reappointment for a third year.

When his Australian club career ended having surpassed Keith Barnes' club record for first grade matches, he returned to England to play his final season with the Sheffield Eagles.

== Representative career ==
In the 1984 State of Origin series Jack made his New South Wales début and played in all three games of that year's series. He was thereafter the Blues' first choice fullback for the next six years, aside from the 1987 fourth game exhibition match in Los Angeles when he made himself unavailable, and game I of 1988 when Cronulla's Jonathon Docking was preferred.

Jack made 17 appearances for New South Wales in State of Origin series between 1984 and 1989.

In 1984, he also made his international début in the three match Ashes series against Great Britain. He played twenty successive Tests (nine versus Britain, seven against New Zealand and two each against France and Papua New Guinea) as well as the 1988 World Cup Final against New Zealand and the Bicentenary International against a Rest of the World team.

On the 1986 Kangaroo tour, Jack played in all six Tests and seven minor Tour matches. He became the first Australian fullback to score three tries in a Test against France in the second Test.

On 20 July 1988, Jack played for Australia in their record 62-point win over Papua New Guinea, scoring a try. After Jack broke an arm in a 1989 pre-season match the door opened for his State of Origin rival Queenslander Gary Belcher who from that point was the favoured Australian representative for the fullback position.

== Post playing ==
Jack was appointed coach of English club Salford in July 1993, but departed following their relegation from the top flight at the end of the 1994–95 Rugby Football League season.

== Personal life ==
Jack's sons Kieren and Brandon both played for the Sydney Swans in the Australian Football League. Another son, Rhys Jack, played in the Bulldogs Toyota Cup (Under-20s) team and Balmain in the New South Wales Cup. Since retiring Jack began learning martial arts and holds a Black Belt in Brazilian jiu-jitsu.

In July 2016, it was reported Kieren Jack had a falling out with his parents. It was reported that Kieren did not invite his parents to his 200th AFL game. Former Swan and radio personality Ryan Fitzgerald criticised Garry Jack and his wife for airing the feud publicly on Twitter.

On 22 January 2021, Jack suffered a cardiac arrest. A friend was able to apply CPR until an ambulance arrived.

== Sources ==
- Big League's 25 Years of Origin Collectors' Edition, News Magazines, Surry Hills, Sydney
- Alan Whiticker & Glen Hudson (2007). The Encyclopedia of Rugby League Players. Wetherill Park, New South Wales: Gary Allen Pty Ltd. p. 261. ISBN 978-1-877082-93-1.
- Gary Lester, ed. (1983). The Sun Book of Rugby League – 1983. Sydney, New South Wales: John Fairfax Marketing. p. 12. ISBN 0-909558-83-3.

Sporting positions
Preceded by Kevin Tamati; 1990–1993	Coach Salford Red Devils; 1994–1995	Succeeded by Andy Gregory; 1995–1999
