= 1989–90 Rugby League Premiership =

1989–90 Premiership
- Structure: National knockout championship
- Winners: Widnes
- Runners-up: Bradford Northern

The 1989–90 Rugby League Premiership was the 16th end of season Rugby League Premiership competition.

The winners were Widnes.

== First round ==
Date	Team one	Team two	Score
22 Apr	Bradford Northern	St Helens	25-8
22 Apr	Leeds	Castleford	24-18
22 Apr	Widnes	Hull F.C.	18-8
22 Apr	Wigan	Warrington	28-26

== Semi-finals ==
Date	Team one	Team two	Score
07 May	Leeds	Widnes	7-27
07 May	Wigan	Bradford Northern	0-9

== Final ==
13 May 1990

Widnes	28-6	Bradford Northern
T-Tait (2), Currier (2), Holliday; G-Davies (4)		T-Marchant; G-Mumby

Old Trafford
Attendance: 40,796
Referee: Colin Morris
Player of the Match: Alan Tait

1	Alan Tait
2	Jonathan Davies
3	Andy Currier
4	Darren Wright
5	Martin Offiah
6	David Hulme
7	Kurt Sorensen
8	Phil McKenzie
9	Les Holliday
10	Mike O'Neill
11	Emosi Koloto
12	Richard Eyres
13	Paul Hulme
Substitutions:
14	Tony Myler for Kurt Sorensen
15	Joey Grima for Emosi Koloto
Coach:
Doug Laughton

1	Ian Wilkinson
2	Gerald Cordle
3	Steve McGowan
4	Tony Marchant
5	Richard Francis
6	Roger Simpson
7	Paul Harkin
8	Kelvin Skerrett
9	Brian Noble
10	David Hobbs
11	Paul Medley
12	Karl Fairbank
13	Keith Mumby
Substitutions:
14	David Cooper for Steve McGowan
15	Craig Richards for Brian Noble
Coach:
Ron Willey
