= Tony Marchant (rugby league) =

GB international rugby league footballer (born 1962)

Personal information
- Full name: Tony Marchant
- Born: 22 December 1962 (age 63) Pontefract district, England
- Height: 5 ft 11 in (1.80 m)
- Weight: 13 st 0 lb (83 kg)

Playing information
- Position: Wing, Centre
Club
Years	Team	Pld	T	G	FG	P
1982–89	Castleford	257	98	0	0	374
1986–86	Wynnum Manly	12	10	0	0	40
1989–94	Bradford Northern	98	62	14	0	280
1994–95	Dewsbury	41	28	0	0	112
1995–96	Castleford	9	3	0	0	12
	Total	417	201	14	0	818
Representative
Years	Team	Pld	T	G	FG	P
1986–88	Yorkshire	4	4	0	0	12
1986	Great Britain	3	2	0	0	8
- Source: As of 7 February 2014

Tony Marchant (born 22 December 1962) is an English former professional rugby league footballer who played in the 1980s and 1990s. He played at representative level for Great Britain and Yorkshire, and at club level for Castleford (two spells), Wynnum Manly Seagulls, Bradford Northern and Dewsbury, as a wing, or centre.

== Background ==
Tony Marchant's birth was registered in Castleford district, West Riding of Yorkshire, England. He is the son of Alan Marchant, and brother of Billy Marchant, both of whom were rugby league professionals.

== Playing career ==
=== Castleford ===
Tony Marchant played at centre in Castleford's 2-13 defeat by Hull F.C. in the 1983 Yorkshire Cup Final during the 1983–84 season at Elland Road, Leeds on Saturday 15 October 1983, played at centre and scored two tries in the 18-22 defeat by Hull Kingston Rovers in the 1985 Yorkshire Cup Final during the 1985–86 season at Elland Road, Leeds on Sunday 27 October 1985, played at centre in the 31-24 victory over Hull F.C. in the 1986 Yorkshire Cup Final during the 1986–87 season at Headingley, Leeds on Saturday 11 October 1986, played at centre in the 12-12 draw with Bradford Northern in the 1987 Yorkshire Cup Final during the 1987–88 season at Headingley, Leeds on Saturday 17 October 1987, played at centre in the 2-11 defeat by Bradford Northern in the 1987 Yorkshire Cup Final replay during the 1987–88 season at Elland Road, Leeds on Saturday 31 October 1987, and played at centre in the 12-33 defeat by Leeds in the 1988 Yorkshire Cup Final during the 1988–89 season at Elland Road, Leeds on Sunday 16 October 1988.

Tony Marchant played at centre in Castleford's 10-18 defeat by Hull Kingston Rovers in the 1983–84 Rugby League Premiership Final during the 1983–84 season at Headingley, Leeds on Saturday 12 May 1984, in front of a crowd of 12,515.

Tony Marchant played at centre and scored the first try in Castleford's 15-14 victory over Hull Kingston Rovers in the 1986 Challenge Cup Final during the 1985–86 season at Wembley Stadium, London on Saturday 3 May 1986.

In 1986 Marchant played a handful of games for Brisbane Rugby League club, Wynnum Manly Seagulls, who won the premiership that year.

=== Bradford Northern ===
In December 1989, Marchant was signed by Bradford Northern in a part-exchange deal, with Castleford receiving Neil Roebuck a fee of £35,000.

Tony Marchant played left wing (replaced by substitute Phil Hellewell on 41-minutes) in Bradford Northern's 2-12 defeat by Warrington in the 1990–91 Regal Trophy Final during the 1990–91 season at Headingley, Leeds on Saturday 12 January 1991, and played right wing in the 15-8 defeat by Wigan in the 1992–93 Regal Trophy Final during the 1992–93 season at Elland Road, Leeds on Saturday 23 January 1993.

He played at centre and scored a try in Bradford Northern's 6-28 defeat by Widnes in the 1989–90 Rugby League Premiership Final during the 1989–90 season at Old Trafford, Manchester on Sunday 13 May 1990, in front of a crowd of 40,796.

=== Representative career ===
Marchant won caps for Great Britain while at Castleford in 1986 against France, and Australia (2 matches).

Marchant won caps for Yorkshire while at Castleford; he played at centre and scored a try in the 26-14 victory over Lancashire at Leeds' stadium on 17 September 1986, played at centre and scored a try in the 16-10 victory over Lancashire at Wigan's stadium on 16 September 1987, played at centre and scored a try in the 28-4 victory over Papua New Guinea at Leeds' stadium on 27 October 1987, and at centre and scored a try in the 24-14 victory over Lancashire at Leeds' stadium on 21 September 1988.
