= Brendan Hill (rugby league) =

English rugby league footballer (born 1964)

Personal information
- Born: 15 September 1964 (age 61)

Playing information
- Position: Prop
Club
Years	Team	Pld	T	G	FG	P
1984–87	Leeds
1987–89	Bradford Northern
1989–93	Halifax
1993–95	Keighley
	Total	0	0	0	0	0
Representative
Years	Team	Pld	T	G	FG	P
1985	Yorkshire	1	0	0	0	0
1986	Great Britain U-21	1	0	0	0	0

Brendan Hill (born 15 September 1964), also known by the nickname of "Bren Gun", is an English former professional rugby league footballer who played in the 1980s and 1990s. He played at representative level for Yorkshire, and at club level for Leeds, Bradford Northern, Halifax and Keighley, as a prop.

== Playing career ==
=== Bradford Northern ===
Brendan Hill played right-prop in Bradford Northern's 12-12 draw with Castleford in the 1987 Yorkshire Cup Final during the 1987–88 season at Headingley, Leeds on Saturday 17 October 1987, and played right-prop, scored a try, and was man of the match (the White Rose Trophy was not presented as it had already been awarded to Paul Harkin in the original final) in the 11-2 victory over Castleford in the 1987 Yorkshire Cup Final replay during the 1987–88 season at Elland Road, Leeds on Saturday 31 October 1987.

=== Halifax ===
Hill was transferred from Bradford Northern to Halifax for a transfer fee of £90,000 during January 1989, (based on increases in average earnings, this would be approximately £244,600 in 2017).

Brendan Hill played left-prop in Halifax's 12-24 defeat by Wigan in the 1989–90 Regal Trophy Final during the 1989–90 season at Headingley, Leeds on Saturday 13 January 1990.
