= Keith Mumby =

Former Great Britain and England international rugby league footballer

Personal information
- Full name: Keith Mumby
- Born: 21 February 1957 (age 69) Spennymoor, Durham, England

Playing information
- Position: Fullback, Centre
Club
Years	Team	Pld	T	G	FG	P
1973–93	Bradford	587	84	777	0	1824
1990–92	Sheffield Eagles	44	3	3	0	18
1992	Keighley	3	0	0	0	0
1994–95	Ryedale-York	7	2	1	0	10
1995	Wakefield Trinity	3	0	0	0	0
	Total	644	89	781	0	1852
Representative
Years	Team	Pld	T	G	FG	P
1976–81	Great Britain U24	6	0	11	0	22
1977–87	Yorkshire	9	1	5	0	13
1979	England	2	1	1	0	5
1982–84	Great Britain	11	2	7	0	22

Keith Mumby (born 21 February 1957), also known by the nickname of "Sir Keith", is an English former rugby league footballer who played in the 1970s, 1980s and 1990s, who most famously played for Bradford Northern between 1973 and 1993, and Sheffield Eagles and Wakefield Trinity, as a toe-end style (rather than round the corner style) goal-kicking fullback, or centre.

== Personal life ==
Keith Mumby was born in Spennymoor, Durham, on 21 February 1957. In his early playing years he worked as a joiner.

== Playing career ==
=== Bradford Northern ===
Mumby began his Bradford Northern professional playing career in 1973, at the age of sixteen. On his début he broke the record for the most points scored on a first appearance for the club, scoring one try and twelve goals.

Mumby played fullback in Bradford Northern's 18–8 victory over York in the 1978 Yorkshire Cup Final during the 1978–79 season at Headingley, Leeds on Saturday 28 October 1978, played fullback, in the 5–10 defeat by Castleford in the 1981 Yorkshire Cup Final during the 1981–82 season at Headingley, Leeds on Saturday 3 October 1981, played fullback, and was man of the match winning the White Rose Trophy in the 7–18 defeat by Hull F.C. in the 1982 Yorkshire Cup Final during the 1981–82 season at Elland Road, Leeds on Saturday 2 October 1982, played stand-off, and scored 2-conversions in the 12–12 draw with Castleford in the 1987 Yorkshire Cup Final during the 1987–88 season at Headingley, Leeds on Saturday 17 October 1987, played fullback in the 11–2 victory over Castleford in the 1987 Yorkshire Cup Final replay during the 1987–88 season at Elland Road, Leeds on Saturday 31 October 1987, appeared as a substitute (replacing stand-off Ivan Henjak) in the 20–14 victory over Featherstone Rovers in the 1989 Yorkshire Cup Final during the 1989–90 season at Headingley, Leeds on Sunday 5 November 1989.

Mumby played fullback, and scored a conversion in Bradford Northern's 6–0 victory over Widnes in the 1979–80 John Player Trophy Final during the 1979–80 season at Headingley, Leeds on Saturday 5 January 1980, and appeared as a substitute (replacing centre Tony Anderson on 44-minutes) in the 15–8 defeat by Wigan in the 1992–93 Regal Trophy Final during the 1992–93 season at Elland Road, Leeds on Saturday 23 January 1993.

In total, he made a record 588 appearances for the club, with only 8 of those substitutions. He scored 68 tries and kicked 779 goals.

Mumby held the cub record for overall points scored, until it was surpassed by Paul Deacon on 23 June 2006.

=== Representative honours ===
Although born in Durham, Mumby was deemed eligible to play for Yorkshire, as he moved to the county at a young age.

Mumby won caps for England while at Bradford Northern in 1979 against Wales, and France, and won caps for Great Britain while at Bradford Northern in 1982 against Australia, in 1983 against France, and in 1984 against France (2 matches), Australia (3 matches), New Zealand (3 matches), and Papua New Guinea.

=== Awards ===
Mumby was awarded First Division Player of the Year for the 1982–83 season.

== Honoured at Bradford ==
Keith Mumby, has been included in Bradford's; 'Millennium Masters', 'Bull Masters', and in August 2007 he was named in the 'Team of the Century'. He is one of only six players to be included in all three lists, the other being; Karl Fairbank, Trevor Foster, James Lowes, Robbie Paul and Ernest Ward. Keith is also the honorary president of the Bradford Bulls as of 2020
