= Andy Platt =

GB & England international rugby league player

Personal information
- Full name: Andrew Platt
- Born: 9 October 1963 (age 63) Billinge Higher End, Wigan, England

Playing information
- Height: 5 ft 10 in (1.78 m)
- Weight: 16 st 10 lb (106 kg)
- Position: Prop, Second-row
Club
Years	Team	Pld	T	G	FG	P
1982–88	St Helens	185	68	0	1	269
1988–94	Wigan	199	24	0	0	96
1995–96	Auckland Warriors	35	0	0	0	0
1995–96	Widnes	13	0	0	0	0
1997–98	Salford City Reds	36	1	0	0	4
1999	Workington Town	20	0	0	0	0
	Total	488	93	0	1	369
Representative
Years	Team	Pld	T	G	FG	P
1985–93	Great Britain	25	2	0	0	8
1995	England	4	0	0	0	0
19??	Lancashire		0	0	0	0

Coaching information
Club
Years	Team	Gms	W	D	L	W%
1999	Workington Town	0	0	0	0

Andrew Platt (born 9 October 1963) is an English former professional rugby league footballer who played as a prop and second-row forward in the 1980s and 1990s.

A Great Britain international representative prop, he played for English clubs St Helens, Wigan, Widnes, Salford and Workington Town as well as in New Zealand for the Auckland Warriors.

== Background ==
Andy Platt was born in Billinge Higher End, Wigan, England

== Playing career ==
=== St Helens ===
He started his professional career at St Helens as a ball-playing second rower, joining from amateur club Wigan St Patricks in June 1982. He made his debut for Saints on 22 August 1982 in a 19–19 draw against Leigh in a league match during the 1982–83 season.

Platt played second-row in St Helens 28-16 victory over Wigan in the 1984 Lancashire Cup Final during the 1984–85 season at Central Park, Wigan on Sunday 28 October 1984.

Platt played loose forward in St. Helens' 15-14 victory over Leeds in the 1987–88 John Player Special Trophy Final during the 1987–88 season at Central Park, Wigan on Saturday 9 January 1988.

=== Wigan ===
In September 1988, Platt was signed by Wigan for a club record fee of £140,000. He was part of the team that dominated British rugby league football in the early 1990s. During the 1991–92 Rugby Football League season, Platt played for defending champions Wigan at prop forward in their 1991 World Club Challenge victory against the visiting Penrith.

During the 1992–93 Rugby Football League season Platt played at prop forward for defending RFL champions Wigan in the 1992 World Club Challenge against the visiting Brisbane Broncos. In 1993 Platt won the Man of Steel Award.

Platt played second-row in Wigan's 22-17 victory over Salford in the 1988 Lancashire Cup Final during the 1988–89 season at Knowsley Road, St. Helens on Sunday 23 October 1988. and played right-prop in the 5-4 victory over St. Helens in the 1992 Lancashire Cup Final during the 1992–93 season at Knowsley Road, St. Helens on Sunday 18 October 1992.

Platt played prop and was sin binned after 53-minutes for brawling with Halifax's Bernard Hill in Wigan's 24-12 victory over Halifax in the 1989–90 Regal Trophy Final during the 1989–90 season at Headingley, Leeds on Saturday 13 January 1990, played right-prop in the 15-8 victory over Bradford Northern in the 1992–93 Regal Trophy Final during the 1992–93 season at Elland Road, Leeds on Saturday 23 January 1993, and played right-prop in the 2-33 defeat by Castleford in the 1993–94 Regal Trophy Final during the 1993–94 season at Elland Road, Leeds on Saturday 22 January 1994.

=== Auckland Warriors ===
In 1994 Platt signed with the new Auckland Warriors franchise of the Australian Rugby League, following John Monie, Dean Bell, Denis Betts and Frano Botica, but did not appear in the club's first ever game due to a knee injury. He spent two seasons with Auckland, but briefly returned to England after the first year to play for Widnes during the 1995–96 season.

=== Later career ===
Platt returned to England with Salford in 1997. He was appointed as captain in May 1997. He finished his career at Workington Town as a player-coach in 1999.

=== International career ===
Platt represented Great Britain and was selected to go on the 1988 Lions tour while at St Helens, and the 1992 Lions tour while at Wigan. He was named man-of-the-match in the tourists' victory over Australia in the second Test of the 1992 Ashes series.

He represented England at the 1995 Rugby League World Cup. Platt became one of only two players to win England caps whilst at the Auckland Warriors, whilst Denis Betts is the only player to win both England and Great Britain caps whilst at the Auckland Warriors. He was selected to play for in the tournament's final at prop forward but Australia won the match and retained the Cup.

== Personal life ==
Platt moved to Australia after ending his playing career. His son, Jon, played rugby league for several clubs in the Queensland Cup.
