= John Joyner =

English rugby league player and coach (born 1955)

Personal information
- Born: 15 March 1955 (age 71) Leeds, West Riding of Yorkshire, England

Playing information
- Position: Centre, Stand-off, Loose forward
Club
Years	Team	Pld	T	G	FG	P
1972–92	Castleford	613	185	0	0	614
Representative
Years	Team	Pld	T	G	FG	P
1976–79	Great Britain U24	5	1	0	0	3
1977–87	Yorkshire	12	6	0	0	18
1980–81	England	4	2	0	0	6
1978–84	Great Britain	16	2	0	0	6

Coaching information
Club
Years	Team	Gms	W	D	L	W%
1993–97	Castleford	127	70	4	53	55

John Joyner (born 15 March 1955) is an English former professional rugby league footballer who played in the 1970s, 1980s and 1990s, and coached in the 1990s. He played at representative level for Great Britain, England and Yorkshire, and at club level for Castleford, as a centre, stand-off, or loose forward, and coached at club level for Castleford.

== Background ==
Joyner was born in Leeds, West Riding of Yorkshire, England.

== Playing career ==
=== Club career ===
Joyner made his debut for Castleford in September 1972 against Bramley. On 16 September 1973, Joyner scored 5 tries in a Player's No.6 Trophy match against Millom, a joint club record shared with several other Castleford players.

Joyner played right-centre in Castleford's 12–4 victory over Leigh in the 1976 BBC2 Floodlit Trophy Final during the 1976–77 season at Hilton Park, Leigh on Tuesday 14 December 1976.

Joyner played right-centre and scored a try in Castleford's 25–15 victory over Blackpool Borough in the 1976–77 Player's No.6 Trophy Final during the 1976–77 season at The Willows, Salford on Saturday 22 January 1977.

Joyner played right-centre in Castleford's 17–7 victory over Featherstone Rovers in the 1977–78 Yorkshire Cup Final during the 1977–78 season at Headingley, Leeds on Saturday 15 October 1977, played stand-off, and scored a try in the 10–5 victory over Bradford Northern in the 1981–82 Yorkshire Cup Final during the 1981–82 season at Headingley, Leeds on Saturday 3 October 1981, played stand-off in the 2–13 defeat by Hull F.C. in the 1983–84 Yorkshire Cup Final during the 1983–84 season at Elland Road, Leeds on Saturday 15 October 1983, played stand-off in the 31–24 victory over Hull F.C. in the 1986–87 Yorkshire Cup Final during the 1986–87 season at Headingley, Leeds on Saturday 11 October 1986, played stand-off in the 12–12 draw with Bradford Northern in the 1987–88 Yorkshire Cup Final during the 1987–88 season at Headingley, Leeds on Saturday 17 October 1987, played loose forward in the 2–11 defeat by Bradford Northern in the 1987–88 Yorkshire Cup Final replay during the 1987–88 season at Elland Road, Leeds on Saturday 31 October 1987, and played loose forward, and scored a try in the 12–33 defeat by Leeds in the 1988–89 Yorkshire Cup Final during the 1988–89 season at Elland Road, Leeds on Sunday 16 October 1988.

Joyner played stand-off and was captain in Castleford's 15–14 victory over Hull Kingston Rovers in the 1985–86 Challenge Cup Final during the 1985–86 season at Wembley Stadium, London on Saturday 3 May 1986.

Joyner's testimonial match at Castleford took place in 1992. In his 20 seasons as a player, he made a club record 613 appearances for the club, scoring 185 tries.

=== Representative honours ===
Joyner won caps for England while at Castleford in 1980 against Wales, and France, in 1981 against France, and Wales, and won caps for Great Britain while at Castleford in 1978 against Australia (2 matches), in 1979 against Australia (3 matches), and New Zealand (3 matches), in 1980 against New Zealand (3 matches), in 1983 against France (2 matches), and in 1984 against France, and New Zealand (sub) (3 matches).

In addition to the above Test matches, John Joyner played right-centre in Great Britain's 7–8 defeat by France in the friendly at Stadio Pier Luigi Penzo, Venice on Saturday 31 July 1982.

Joyner won caps for Yorkshire while at Castleford playing Centre and scoring a try in the 12–12 draw with Cumberland at Whitehaven's stadium on 15 February 1977, playing Centre and scoring a try in the 37–9 victory over Lancashire at Hull FC's stadium on 20 September 1978, playing Centre in the 7–23 defeat by Lancashire at Widnes' stadium on 27 September 1978, playing stand-off in the 16–19 defeat by Lancashire at Castleford's stadium on 12 September 1979, and Stand-off in the 16–17 defeat by Cumberland at Hull Kingston Rovers' stadium on 17 September 1980.

== Coaching career ==
After ending his playing career, Joyner became assistant coach to Darryl Van de Velde at Castleford, and was promoted to head coach following Van de Velde's departure at the end of the 1992–93 season. He was the coach in Castleford's 33–2 victory over Wigan in the 1993–94 Regal Trophy Final during the 1993–94 season at Headingley, Leeds on Saturday 22 January 1994. He left the club in April 1997, ending a 25-year association with the club.

== Honours ==
- Open Rugby World XIII: October 1979, September 1981
- Challenge Cup: Winners 1986
- Castleford Tigers Hall of Fame
