= Kevin Ward (rugby league) =

GB international rugby league footballer (born 1957)

Personal information
- Full name: Kevin Allan Ward
- Born: 5 August 1957 (age 68) Wakefield, West Riding of Yorkshire, England

Playing information
- Height: 5 ft 11 in (1.80 m)
- Weight: 16 st 1 lb (102 kg)
- Position: Prop, Second-row, Loose forward
Club
Years	Team	Pld	T	G	FG	P
1978–89	Castleford	313	74	0	0	249
1987–88	Manly Sea Eagles	15	2	0	0	8
1990–93	St Helens	86+3	8	0	0	32
	Total	417	84	0	0	289
Representative
Years	Team	Pld	T	G	FG	P
1980–81	Great Britain U24	3	0	0	0	0
1982–87	Yorkshire	2	1	0	0	3
1984–92	Great Britain	17	0	0	0	0

Kevin Ward (born 5 August 1957) is an English former professional rugby league footballer who played in the 1970s, 1980s and 1990s. He played at representative level as a prop for Great Britain and Yorkshire, and at club level in England for Castleford and St. Helens, and in Australia for the Manly Warringah Sea Eagles, as prop, second-row, or loose forward. Ward was inducted into the Castleford Tigers Hall of Fame.

== Background ==
Ward was born in Wakefield, West Riding of Yorkshire, England.

== Playing career ==
=== Castleford ===
A product of Stanley Rangers ARLFC, he began his career as a centre, but soon moved to the forward pack.

Ward's biggest career highlight at Castleford was winning the 1986 Challenge Cup, playing at prop in the club's 15–14 victory over Hull Kingston Rovers at Wembley Stadium, London on Saturday 3 May 1986.

Ward also played right-second-row in Castleford's 10–5 victory over Bradford Northern in the 1981 Yorkshire Cup Final during the 1981–82 season at Headingley, Leeds, on Saturday 3 October 1981, played left-prop in the 18–22 defeat by Hull Kingston Rovers in the 1985 Yorkshire Cup Final during the 1985–86 season at Headingley, Leeds, on Sunday 27 October 1985, played left-prop, and scored a try in the 31–24 victory over Hull F.C. in the 1986 Yorkshire Cup Final during the 1986–87 season at Headingley, Leeds, on Saturday 11 October 1986, played right-prop in the 12–12 draw with Bradford Northern in the 1987 Yorkshire Cup Final during the 1987–88 season at Headingley, Leeds, on Saturday 17 October 1987, played left-prop in the 2–11 defeat by Bradford Northern in the 1987 Yorkshire Cup Final replay during the 1987–88 season at Elland Road, Leeds, on Saturday 31 October 1987, played left-prop in the 12–33 defeat by Leeds in the 1988 Yorkshire Cup Final during the 1988–89 season at Elland Road, Leeds, on Sunday 16 October 1988.

While at Castleford, he spent time in Australia playing for Manly, where he won the 1987 NSWRL Premiership.

=== St Helens ===
In July 1990, Ward was signed by St Helens for a fee of £80,000.

Ward played right-prop in St Helens' 24–14 victory over Rochdale Hornets in the 1991 Lancashire Cup Final during the 1991–92 season at Wilderspool Stadium, Warrington, on Sunday 20 October 1991, and played right-prop in the 4–5 defeat by Wigan in the 1992 Lancashire Cup Final during the 1992–93 season at Knowsley Road, St Helens, on Sunday 18 October 1992.

His final game for the club was on 9 April 1993 (Good Friday) at Central Park against Wigan, where Ward sustained a badly broken leg. The injury required several operations, and forced him to retire from the game.

=== Representative honours ===
Ward won a cap as a prop for Yorkshire while at Castleford in the 16-10 victory over Lancashire at Wigan's stadium on 16 September 1987.

Ward was selected to go on the 1988 Great Britain Lions tour. He was named man-of-the-match in the first Ashes Test. It was announced during the tour that Ward would rejoin Manly-Warringah for the remainder of their season once the tour was completed.

Ward won caps for Great Britain in 1984 against France, in 1986 against Australia (2 matches), in 1986 in the 1985–1988 Rugby League World Cup against Australia, in 1987 in the 1985–1988 Rugby League World Cup against Papua New Guinea, in 1988 against France (2 matches), in 1988 in the 1985–1988 Rugby League World Cup against Papua New Guinea, Australia (2 matches), in 1988 in the 1985–1988 Rugby League World Cup against Australia, and New Zealand, in 1989 against France (2 matches), in 1990 against Australia (2 matches), and in 1992 in the 1989–1992 Rugby League World Cup against Australia. His last international appearance was in the 1992 World Cup Final against Australia at Wembley Stadium, London.
