= Chris Chapman (rugby league) =

English rugby league footballer

Personal information
- Full name: Christopher Chapman
- Born: 14 April 1966 (age 58)

Playing information
- Position: Wing
Club
Years	Team	Pld	T	G	FG	P
1984–90	Castleford	60	26	0	0	104
1990–94	Huddersfield	91	41	0	0	164
	Total	151	67	0	0	268

Coaching information
Club
Years	Team	Gms	W	D	L	W%
2013–18	England Women	13	7	1	5	54

Chris Chapman (born 14 April 1966) is a former professional rugby league footballer who played in the 1980s and 1990s. He played at club level for Castleford and Huddersfield, as a wing.

== Playing career ==
=== Castleford ===
Chapman played left wing (replaced by substitute David Roockley) in Castleford's 12–33 defeat by Leeds in the 1988 Yorkshire Cup Final during the 1988–89 season at Headingley, Leeds on Sunday 16 October 1988.

=== Huddersfield ===
In May 1990, Chapman was signed by Huddersfield for a club record fee of £12,500.

== Coaching career ==
Chapman coached the England women's national rugby league team at the 2013 and 2017 Women's Rugby League World Cups, as well as five matches, all against France, in the intervening years. During Chapman's tenure as head coach, England women won seven matches (six against France and one against Papua New Guinea), drew one match (against France), and lost five matches. The losses were all in World Cup matches, to Australia twice, New Zealand twice, and the Cook Islands.
