= 1987–88 Yorkshire Cup =

- Structure: Regional knockout championship
- Teams: 18
- Winners: Bradford Northern
- Runners-up: Castleford

The 1987–88 Yorkshire Cup was the 80th occasion on which the Yorkshire Cup competition was held. Bradford Northern won the trophy by beating Castleford by the score of 11–2 in a replay after drawing the first match 12–12. The competition was sponsored by John Smith's Brewery.

This was the fifth time in the incredible eleven-year period in which Castleford, previously only once winners in 1977, will make eight appearances in the Yorkshire Cup final, winning on four and ending as runner-up on four occasions. This season there were no junior/amateur clubs taking part, no new entrants and no "leavers" and so the total of entries remained the same at eighteen. This in turn resulted in the necessity to continue with a preliminary round to reduce the number of clubs entering the first round to sixteen.

== Background ==
The Rugby Football League's Yorkshire Cup competition was a knock-out competition between (mainly professional) rugby league clubs from the county of Yorkshire. The actual area was at times increased to encompass other teams from outside the county such as Newcastle, Mansfield, Coventry, and even London (in the form of Acton & Willesden).
The Rugby League season always (until the onset of "Summer Rugby" in 1996) ran from around August-time through to around May-time and this competition always took place early in the season, in the Autumn, with the final taking place in (or just before) December (The only exception to this was when disruption of the fixture list was caused during, and immediately after, the two World Wars)

== Competition and results ==
=== Preliminary round ===
Involved 2 matches and 4 clubs

Game No	Fixture Date	Home team	Score	Away team	Venue	Att	Rec	Notes	Ref
P1	Wed 2 Sep 1987	Hull F.C.	54–8	Huddersfield Barracudas	Boulevard	2402			
P2	Wed 2 Sep 1987	Wakefield Trinity	25–14	Dewsbury	Belle Vue	1723			

=== Round 1 ===
Involved 8 matches (with no byes) and 16 clubs

Game No	Fixture Date	Home team	Score	Away team	Venue	Att	Rec	Notes	Ref
1	Sun 13 Sep 1987	Bramley	39–12	Doncaster	McLaren Field	828			
2	Sun 13 Sep 1987	Castleford	32–12	Hunslet	Wheldon Road	4748			
3	Sun 13 Sep 1987	Featherstone Rovers	28–6	Batley	Post Office Road	1433			
4	Sun 13 Sep 1987	Hull Kingston Rovers	12–19	Bradford Northern	Craven Park (1)	3852			
5	Sun 13 Sep 1987	Keighley	12–34	Halifax	Lawkholme Lane	4086			
6	Sun 13 Sep 1987	Leeds	28–24	Hull F.C.	Headingley	7704			
7	Sun 13 Sep 1987	Mansfield Marksman	18–23	York	Lowmoor Road	256			
8	Sun 13 Sep 1987	Wakefield Trinity	32–18	Sheffield Eagles	Belle Vue	2111			

=== Round 2 - Quarter-finals ===
Involved 4 matches and 8 clubs

Game No	Fixture Date	Home team	Score	Away team	Venue	Att	Rec	Notes	Ref
1	Tue 22 Sep 1987	Bramley	6–30	Bradford Northern	McLaren Field	2181			
2	Wed 23 Sep 1987	Featherstone Rovers	43–6	York	Post Office Road	1617			
3	Wed 23 Sep 1987	Halifax	0–10	Castleford	Thrum Hall	6101			
4	Wed 23 Sep 1987	Leeds	36–8	Wakefield Trinity	Headingley	6693			

=== Round 3 – Semi-finals ===
Involved 2 matches and 4 clubs

Game No	Fixture Date	Home team	Score	Away team	Venue	Att	Rec	Notes	Ref
1	Wed 30 Sep 1987	Bradford Northern	16–5	Leeds	Odsal	7730			
2	Wed 30 Sep 1987	Featherstone Rovers	8–36	Castleford	Post Office Road	5329			

=== Final ===
The initial match was played at Headingley, Leeds. The score was 12–12, the attendance was 10,947, and receipts were £40,283. This match was the final appearance for Bradford Northern's Welsh former rugby union international Terry Holmes, who announced his retirement shortly after this game due to a persistent knee problem.

17 October 1987

Bradford Northern	12 – 12	Castleford
Tries: Fairbank; Goals: Mumby (2), Hobbs (2)		Tries: Plange, Lindner; Goals: Ketteridge (2)

Headingley, Leeds
Attendance: 10,947
Referee: K. Allatt (Southport)
Player of the Match: Paul Harkin

Bradford Northern	№	Castleford
	teams	
Gary Mercer	1	David Roockley
Phil Ford	2	David Plange
Steve McGowan	3	Tony Marchant
Roger Simpson	4	Michael Beattie
Richard Francis	5	Gary Hyde
Keith Mumby	6	John Joyner
Paul Harkin	7	Roy Southernwood
Jeff Grayshon	8	Alan Shillito
Brian Noble	9	Kevin Beardmore
Brendan Hill	10	Kevin Ward
Kelvin Skerrett	11	Martin Ketteridge
Karl Fairbank	12	John Fifita
Terry Holmes	13	Bob Lindner
	Substitutes	
Neil Roebuck (for Terry Holmes)	14	Robert "Bob" Beardmore (for Alan Shillito)
David Hobbs (for Jeff Grayshon)	15	Dean Sampson (for Kevin Beardmore)
Barry Seabourne	Coach	David Sampson

=== Final - Replay ===
The replay was at Elland Road, Leeds. Bradford Northern won the match 11–2, the attendance was 8,175, and receipts were £30,732. The game was marred by a brawl between both sets of players which took place just before half time. Bradford's Karl Fairbank and Castleford's John Joyner were sent to the sin bin as a result. A further player from each team (Kelvin Skerrett and John Fifita) were sin-binned for separate incidents during the second half.

31 October 1987

Bradford Northern	11 – 2	Castleford
Tries: Hill, Heron; Goals: Hobbs; Drop goals: Hobbs		Goals: Ketteridge

Elland Road, Leeds
Attendance: 8,175
Referee: K. Allatt (Southport)
Player of the Match: Brendan Hill

Bradford Northern	№	Castleford
	teams	
Keith Mumby	1	David Roockley
Phil Ford	2	David Plange
Steve McGowan	3	Tony Marchant
Gary Mercer	4	Michael Beattie
Roger Simpson	5	Gary Hyde
Russell Stewart	6	Roy Southernwood
Paul Harkin	7	Robert "Bob" Beardmore
David Hobbs	8	Kevin Ward
Brian Noble	9	Kenny Hill
Brendan Hill	10	John Fifita
Kelvin Skerrett	11	Martin Ketteridge
Karl Fairbank	12	Keith England
Wayne Heron	13	John Joyner
	Substitutes	
Neil Roebuck	14	Giles Boothroyd (for Keith England)
David Redfearn	15	Dean Sampson (for John Fifita)
Barry Seabourne	Coach	David Sampson

=== The road to success ===
The following chart excludes any preliminary round fixtures/results

First round
Bramley	39
Doncaster	12
Hull Kingston Rovers	12
Bradford Northern	19
Leeds	28
Hull F.C.	24
Wakefield Trinity	32
Sheffield Eagles	18
Featherstone Rovers	28
Batley	6
Mansfield Marksman	18
York	23
Keighley	12
Halifax	34
Castleford	32
Hunslet	12

Second round
Bramley	6
Bradford Northern	30
Leeds	36
Wakefield Trinity	8
Featherstone Rovers	43
York	6
Halifax	0
Castleford	10

Semi-finals
Bradford Northern	16
Leeds	5
Featherstone Rovers	8
Castleford	36

Final
Bradford Northern	12 (11)
Castleford	12 (2)

== See also ==
- 1987–88 Rugby Football League season
- Rugby league county cups
