= Steve McGowan =

English rugby league footballer

Personal information
- Born: 25 February 1964 (age 61)

Playing information
- Position: Centre
Club
Years	Team	Pld	T	G	FG	P
1983–94	Bradford Northern	242	100	5	0	432
1990	North Sydney	6	1	0	0	4
1994–96	Wakefield Trinity	22	3	0	0	12
	Total	270	104	5	0	448

Steve McGowan is a former professional rugby league footballer who played in the 1980s and 1990s. He played at club level for Bradford Northern, North Sydney and Wakefield Trinity, as a centre.

== Playing career ==
=== Bradford Northern ===
McGowan played centre in Bradford Northern's 12–12 draw with Castleford in the 1987 Yorkshire Cup Final during the 1987–88 season at Headingley, Leeds on Saturday 17 October 1987, played centre, in the 11–2 victory over Castleford in the 1987 Yorkshire Cup Final replay during the 1987–88 season at Elland Road, Leeds on Saturday 31 October 1987, and played centre, in the 20–14 victory over Featherstone Rovers in the 1989 Yorkshire Cup Final during the 1989–90 season at Headingley, Leeds on Sunday 5 November 1989.

McGowan played centre, in Bradford Northern's 15–8 defeat by Wigan in the 1992–93 Regal Trophy Final during the 1992–93 season at Elland Road, Leeds on Saturday 23 January 1993.

Steve McGowan's Testimonial match at Bradford Northern took place in 1993.

In November 1994, McGowan, along with Bradford teammate Daio Powell, were sold to Wakefield Trinity in exchange for Gary Christie.
