= Martin Offiah =

British rugby player (b. 1965)

Martin Offiah MBE
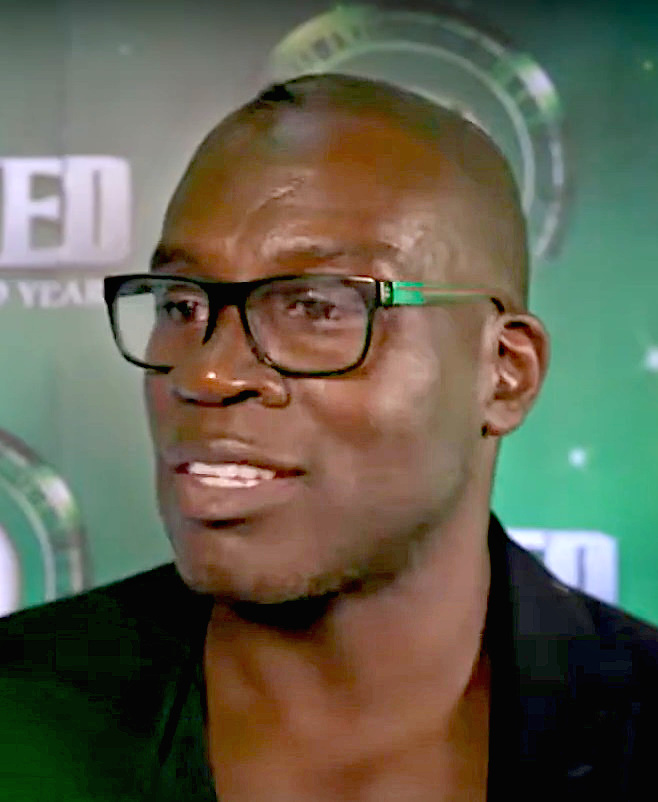
- Offiah at Wicked 10th Birthday 2016

Personal information
- Full name: Martin Nwokocha Offiah
- Born: 29 December 1965 (age 60) (Note: Offiah's date of birth is often reported as 29 December 1966, but the correct year is 1965.) Hackney, London, England

Playing information
- Height: 6 ft 1 in (1.85 m)
- Weight: 14 st 5 lb (91 kg)

Rugby league
- Position: Wing
Club
Years	Team	Pld	T	G	FG	P
1987–91	Widnes	145	181	0	0	724
1989	Eastern Suburbs	12	9	0	0	36
1991	St George Dragons	14	11	0	0	44
1992–95	Wigan	159	186	1	3	749
1993	Eastern Suburbs	1	0	0	0	0
1996–99	London Broncos	48	36	0	0	144
2000–01	Salford City Reds	45	23	0	2	94
	Total	424	446	1	5	1791
Representative
Years	Team	Pld	T	G	FG	P
1992–96	England	5	8	0	1	33
1988–94	Great Britain	33	26	0	0	104

Rugby union
Club
Years	Team	Pld	T	G	FG	P
1996–97	Bedford	14	8	0	0	40
2001–02	London Wasps	8	5	0	0	25
	Total	22	13	0	0	65

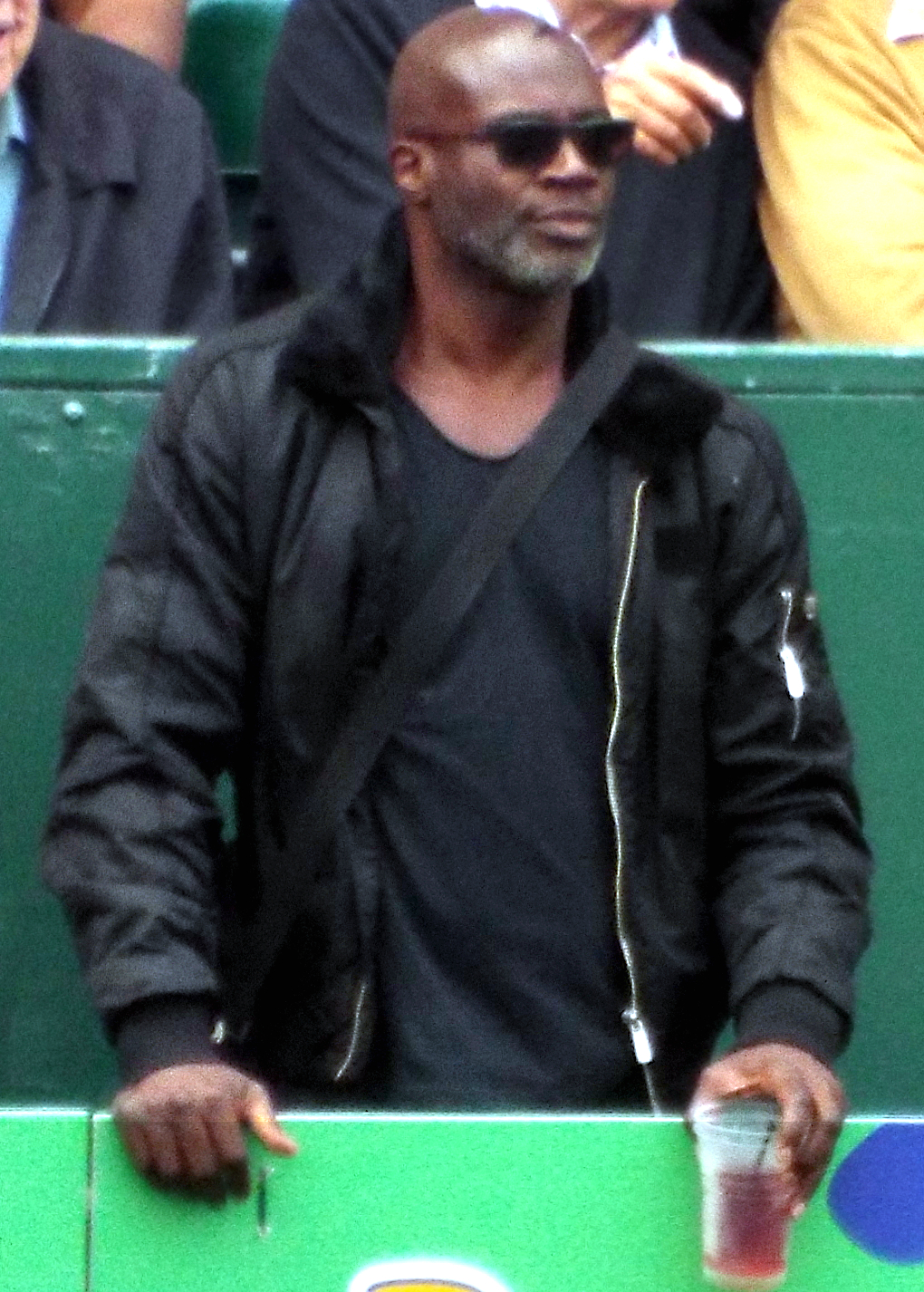
Martin Offiah in 2016

Martin Nwokocha Offiah MBE (/ɒˈfiə/ O-fee-ə (original pronunciation), /əˈfaɪə/ ə-FYE-ə (commonly used)); born 29 December 1965) is an English former professional rugby league and rugby union footballer who played in the 1980s, 1990s and 2000s. He scored over 500 tries during his rugby league career, making him the third-highest try scorer (and top try-scoring English player) of all time. Offiah was inducted into the Rugby League Hall of Fame in 2013, and now features in a statue of great rugby league players outside Wembley Stadium.

He was a Great Britain and England international winger, and due to his running speed he was nicknamed "Chariots" Offiah after the film Chariots of Fire. Offiah played rugby union before moving to English rugby league club Widnes in 1987. He later played for Wigan, London Broncos and Salford City Reds, and in Australia for Eastern Suburbs and St. George. After rugby union turned professional, Offiah also had short spells playing for Bedford and London Wasps.

Since retiring Offiah has appeared on several reality TV shows. In May 2023, he was appointed an ambassador of Wigan Warriors.

== Early life ==
Offiah was born in Hackney, London, England to Nigerian parents of Igbo origin, and attended Woolverstone Hall School near Ipswich, Suffolk, where he represented the school at fencing and played rugby union and cricket. He played cricket for the Essex 2nd XI but soon realised his main talent was for rugby union.

He first played club-level rugby union for Ipswich RFC and Rosslyn Park. After starring on the rugby sevens circuit and for the Barbarians, there was talk of an England future for Offiah.

== Professional playing career ==
=== 1987–91: Widnes ===
Inc. 1989 summer stint at Eastern Suburbs & 1991 summer stint at St. George Dragons

Offiah was spotted by Widnes coach Doug Laughton playing in the Middlesex Sevens, and was signed by the club to play rugby league for the 1987–88 season. Alex Murphy had been interested in acquiring Offiah from rugby union, but the board of directors at St. Helens infamously referred to Offiah as an "uncoordinated clown" and the interest was not followed up with action. Within months, he became the most talked-about winger since Billy Boston for his lightning speed and try-scoring; at Widnes he forged a reputation as a devastating winger, helping the team win both the Championship and Premiership. He ended his début season with 42 tries, making him the league's top try scorer, also breaking the club record held by Frank Myler for most tries scored in a season. He received the Man of Steel award for his efforts.

He was also rewarded with a place in the 1988 Great Britain Lions tour of Australasia, where he played in all three Tests of the Ashes series which was lost to Australia. While on tour with the Lions, Offiah took part in a 100-metre match race at Wentworth Park in Sydney against Australian flyers Dale Shearer and John Ferguson (Ferguson replaced Greg Alexander who was forced to withdraw through injury). Offiah easily won the race from Shearer and Ferguson.

In the 1988–89 season, Widnes won the Championship and Premiership for the second successive year, and Offiah was again the league's top try scorer with 58 tries in 41 games. He played in Widnes' 6–12 defeat by Wigan in the 1988–89 John Player Special Trophy final Burnden Park in Bolton.

He then spent the summer in Australia playing for Eastern Suburbs. He scored a try on his NSWRL début against Western Suburbs, and went on to score nine tries in 12 games for the club before returning to Widnes.

During the 1989–90 season, Offiah played for Widnes on the wing in their 1989 World Club Challenge victory against the visiting Canberra Raiders. Offiah scored a try in Widnes' 24–18 victory over Salford in the 1990 Lancashire Cup final.

In 1991, Offiah had a second spell in Australia, this time playing for St George Dragons. He scored 11 tries in 14 games, including a hat trick against his former club, Eastern Suburbs.

Over four seasons at Widnes Offiah scored 181 tries in 145 games.

=== 1992–95: Wigan ===
Inc. 1993 summer stint at Eastern Suburbs

Offiah joined Wigan in January 1992 for a world record fee of £440,000 (based on increases in average earnings, this would be approximately £979,384.20 in 2025). This remained a record for a total cash transfer until Wigan paid £450,000 for Stuart Fielden from the Bradford Bulls in 2006.

Playing in his regular left wing position, Offiah formed a devastating partnership with Gene Miles in his first season at Wigan, scoring 30 tries in just 15 games. He set a new club record of ten in a single match against Leeds in the Premiership semi-final in May.

Offiah played in Wigan's 5–4 victory over St Helens in the 1992 Lancashire Cup Final at Knowsley Road.

He played in a 15–8 victory over Bradford Northern in the 1992–93 Regal Trophy Final at Elland Road, played in the 2–33 defeat by Castleford in the 1993–94 Regal Trophy Final at Headingley, and scored a try in the 40–10 victory over Warrington in the 1994–95 Regal Trophy Final at Alfred McAlpine Stadium, and played in the 25–16 victory over St Helens in the 1995–96 Regal Trophy Final.

He was selected to go on the 1992 Great Britain Lions tour of Australia and New Zealand. Before the match against the Parramatta Eels, Offiah had a 100-metre race against Eels winger Lee Oudenryn. Offiah appeared to slip slightly at the start and Oudenryn won by half a yard.

During the 1992–93 season Offiah played on the wing for defending RFL champions Wigan in the 1992 World Club Challenge against the visiting Brisbane Broncos. A week before the WCC, Offiah had played on the wing for Great Britain in the World Cup final against Australia at Wembley in front of an international rugby league record crowd of 73,631 fans.

Offiah played in four Challenge Cup wins, five Championship teams, three Regal Trophy wins and one Lancashire Cup victory. He was twice man of the match winning the Lance Todd Trophy at Wembley. His 90-metre solo try in the 1994 Challenge Cup Final win over Leeds is remembered as one of the finest ever seen in a final, but he made a habit of such runs during his career, scoring a similar try just weeks before against Castleford. After the 1993–94 season Offiah travelled with defending champions Wigan to Brisbane, playing on the wing in their 1994 World Club Challenge victory over Australian premiers, the Brisbane Broncos.

In 1995, Offiah's life story, a 30-minute documentary, was produced and directed by Pogus Caesar for Carlton TV UK as part of the Respect series. Offiah was selected to play for England in the 1995 World Cup final on the wing, but Australia won the match and retained the cup.

Offiah jointly holds the record for the most tries scored in a match for England.

Offiah made 158 appearances for Wigan with another single appearance as a substitute. He scored 186 tries, more than a try a game. He also managed a goal and three drop goals, scoring a total of 749 points for the club. Upon leaving he sent a letter to the Wigan Observer thanking fans and the club for his time there.

=== 1996–99: London Broncos ===
Inc. 1996–97 winter stint at Bedford Blues

Following Offiah's departure from Wigan, he return to the capital and signed for London Broncos.

Following the switch to summer rugby in 1996, Offiah signed for Bedford Blues during the Super League off-season He played 14 games for the club, scoring 10 tries, before returning to the Broncos for the 1997 season.

He was awarded an MBE in the 1997 New Year Honours.

He played for London in their 1999 Challenge Cup Final defeat against Leeds. In total, he scored 36 tries in 48 games for the club.

=== 2000–01: Salford Red Devils ===
After the London Broncos he moved to Salford City Reds for the 2000 Super League V, staying for two seasons, playing 45 games and scoring 23 tries. He scored his 500th career try in July 2001 in a 37–14 win against his former club London Broncos.

=== 2001–02: Wasps ===
He finished his career in 2001–02 playing rugby union for London Wasps, who were coached by his former Wigan team-mate Shaun Edwards. He played in eight games for the club, scoring five tries.

== Career statistics ==
=== Club ===
Appearance and scoring statistics by club and season
Club	Season	League	Apps	Tries	Goals	DGs	Points
Widnes	1987–88	First Division	35	42	0	0	168
Widnes	1988–89	First Division	41	58	0	0	232
Widnes	1989–90	First Division	32	40	0	0	160
Widnes	1990–91	First Division	37	41	0	0	164
Widnes	Total		145	181	0	0	724
Eastern Suburbs	1989	NSWRL	12	9	0	0	36
St George	1991	NSWRL	14	11	0	0	44
Wigan	1991–92	First Division	16	30	0	0	120
Wigan	1992–93	First Division	38	30	1	2	124
Wigan	1993–94	First Division	34	35	0	1	141
Wigan	1994–95	First Division	38	53	0	0	212
Wigan	1995–96	First Division	23	26	0	0	104
Wigan	1996	Super League	10	12	0	0	48
Wigan	Total		159	186	1	3	749
Eastern Suburbs	1993	NSWRL	1	0	0	0	0
London Broncos	1996	Super League	4	3	0	0	12
London Broncos	1997	Super League	16	13	0	0	52
London Broncos	1998	Super League	11	7	0	0	28
London Broncos	1999	Super League	17	13	0	0	52
London Broncos	Total		48	36	0	0	144
Salford Red Devils	2000	Super League	25	16	0	2	66
Salford Red Devils	2001	Super League	20	7	0	0	28
Salford Red Devils	Total		45	23	0	2	94
Career Total			424	446	1	5	1,791

=== Overall ===
Offiah scored 501 tries during his rugby league career. His try total in British rugby league (481) puts him third in the list of all-time try scorers (behind Brian Bevan and Billy Boston).

Team	Appearances	Tries	Goals	Drop goals	Points
Club total	424	446	1	5	1,791
England	5	8	0	1	33
Great Britain	33	26	0	0	104
Great Britain (non-Test)	12	20	0	0	80
Lancashire	1	0	0	0	0
Rugby League Chairman's XIII	1	1	0	0	4
Career total	476	501	1	6	2,012

== Honours ==
=== Club ===
Widnes

- Rugby Football League Championship First Division
  - Champion: 1987–88, 1988–89
- Rugby League Premiership
  - Champion: 1987–88, 1988–89, 1989–90
- Lancashire Cup
  - Champion: 1990–91
- World Club Challenge
  - Champion: 1989

Wigan

- Rugby Football League Championship First Division
  - Champion: 1992–93, 1993–94, 1994–95
- Rugby League Premiership
  - Champion: 1993–94, 1994–95
- Challenge Cup
  - Champion: 1992–93, 1993–94, 1994–95
- Lancashire Cup
  - Champion: 1992–93
- League Cup
  - Champion: 1992–93, 1994–95
- World Club Challenge
  - Champion: 1994

=== International ===
England

- Rugby League World Cup
  - Runners-up: 1995

=== Individual ===
- Man of Steel: 1988
- Lance Todd Trophy: 1992, 1994
- Rugby Football League Hall of Fame: Inducted 2013
- Wigan Warriors Hall of Fame: Inducted 2016

=== Orders ===
- MBE: 1997 New Year Honours

== Post-playing career ==
In 2004, Offiah was one of the celebrities who took part in the first series of the BBC One show Strictly Come Dancing, reaching fourth place with his partner Erin Boag. In 2005, alongside Natasha Kaplinsky, he hosted the one-off special, Strictly African Dancing.

In 2006, Offiah appeared on a Reality TV special of The Weakest Link, winning £10,050 and splitting the winnings with Danniella Westbrook. Offiah won Celebrity Come Dine With Me in 2011 which was a Rugby World Cup special. Offiah beat Victor Ubogo, Kyran Bracken and Gareth Chilcott. Offiah has also appeared on BBC quiz show Pointless, firstly with Chris Kamara in 2012, where they were eliminated in the first round, the second time in 2013 with cricketer Philip Tufnell where they won the cash prize by getting a Pointless answer in the final round. Offiah donated his £1,250 prize to the Joining Jack Charity. In 2014, he was a contestant on Splash!, and was the fourth to be eliminated from the competition. In 2015, he appeared with his son Tyler on Big Star's Little Star where they won £11,000 for charity. Also in 2015, Offiah took part on All Star Mr & Mrs with his partner Virginia.

Offiah worked as a pundit for Sky Sports rugby from 2008 until 2013. He was a regular studio guest during the 2008 Rugby League World Cup, and presented a weekly Super League round up on Sky Sports News. He has worked as an agent for several rugby players including Richie Myler and Kyle Eastmond. Offiah has also appeared several times on the TV show A Question of Sport. In January 2018, Offiah participated in And They're Off! in aid of Sport Relief.

Offiah is part of the Rugby League Monument that sits outside Wembley Stadium, his bronze likeness depicting his try celebration from the 1994 Challenge Cup final.

Since 2019, Offiah has been a brand ambassador for the electric vehicle charging infrastructure company Connected Kerb. His passion for electric vehicles began when he received a lift from former England rugby union player and World Cup winner Andy Gomersal in 2016. In December 2021, he facilitated a partnership between Connected Kerb and one of his former clubs London Broncos in which the Plough Lane outfit would wear the EV company's logo on their kit throughout 2022.

Since 2024, Offiah has trained grappling at Grange Jiu Jitsu, and was awarded his Brazilian Jiu Jitsu blue belt in 2025.

== Personal life ==
Offiah has two sons, including Tyler with his wife, Virginia Offiah, and lives in Ealing, West London. He is the uncle of professional footballer Odel Offiah.

== Notes ==
Achievements
Preceded by Ellery Hanley	Rugby League Transfer Record; Widnes to Wigan; 1992–1995	Succeeded by Paul Newlove
