= Martin Ketteridge =

Scotland international rugby league footballer (born 1964)

Personal information
- Full name: Martin Ketteridge
- Born: 2 October 1964 (age 61)

Playing information
- Position: prop, Second-row
Club
Years	Team	Pld	T	G	FG	P
1984–95	Castleford	306	14	420	0	896
1989–90	→ Sheffield Eagles (loan)	3	0	9	0	18
1995–96	Halifax	37	1	3	0	10
1997	Hunslet R.L.F.C.	15	1	7	0	18
	Total	361	16	439	0	942
Representative
Years	Team	Pld	T	G	FG	P
1996	Scotland	4	0	5	0	10

Martin Ketteridge (born 2 October 1964) is a former professional rugby league footballer who played in the 1980s and 1990s. He played at representative level for Scotland, and at club level for Moorends ARLFC (in Thorne, South Yorkshire), Castleford (two spells), the Sheffield Eagles and Halifax, as a prop, or second-row.

== Playing career ==
=== Club career ===
Ketteridge played at second-row and scored a goal in Castleford's 15–14 victory over Hull Kingston Rovers in the 1986 Challenge Cup Final during the 1985–86 season at Wembley Stadium, London on 3 May 1986, and played at second-row, and scored 2-goals in the 12–28 defeat by Wigan in the 1992 Challenge Cup Final during the 1991–92 season at Wembley on 2 May 1992, in front of a crowd of 77,386.

Ketteridge played at second-row in Castleford's 18–22 defeat by Hull Kingston Rovers in the 1985 Yorkshire Cup Final during the 1985–86 season at Headingley, Leeds on 27 October 1985, played at second-row, scored a try, and 5-goals in the 31–24 victory over Hull F.C. in the 1986 Yorkshire Cup Final during the 1986–87 season at Headingley on 11 October 1986, played at second-row, and scored a 2-goals in the 12–12 draw with Bradford Northern in the 1987 Yorkshire Cup Final during the 1987–88 season at Headingley on 17 October 1987, played at second-row, and scored a goal in the 2–11 defeat by Bradford Northern in the 1987 Yorkshire Cup Final replay during the 1987–88 season at Elland Road, Leeds on 31 October 1987, appeared as a substitute (replacing second-row Neil Battye) in the 12–33 defeat by Leeds in the 1988 Yorkshire Cup Final during the 1988–89 season at Elland Road on 16 October 1988, and played on the wing and scored a try in the 11–8 victory over Wakefield Trinity in the 1990 Yorkshire Cup Final during the 1990–91 season at Elland Road on 23 September 1990.

Ketteridge played at prop, scored two tries, and was a man of the match, in Castleford's 33–2 victory over Wigan in the 1993–94 Regal Trophy Final during the 1993–94 season at Headingley on 22 January 1994.

In February 1995, Ketteridge was transferred from to Castleford to Halifax in exchange for Lee Harland.

=== International honours ===
Ketteridge won three caps (plus 1 as a substitute) for Scotland in 1996 while at Halifax.
