= Karl Fairbank =

GB international rugby league footballer

Personal information
- Born: 1 June 1963 (age 63) Greetland, West Riding of Yorkshire, England

Playing information
- Position: Prop, Second-row
Club
Years	Team	Pld	T	G	FG	P
1986–96	Bradford Northern	332	108	0	0	432
Representative
Years	Team	Pld	T	G	FG	P
1987–91	Yorkshire	2	1	0	0	4
1987–94	Great Britain	16	2	0	0	8
- Relatives: Jacob Fairbank (nephew)

Karl Fairbank (born 1 June 1963) is a former professional rugby league footballer who played in the 1980s and 1990s, and coached in the 1990s, 2000s and 2010s. He played at representative level for Great Britain, and at club level for Bradford Northern, as a prop, or second-row, and has coached at club level for Halifax Under-21s.

== Playing career ==
=== Bradford Northern/Bradford Bulls ===
Fairbank signed for Bradford Northern from amateur club Elland in July 1986. He spent his entire professional career at the club, scoring 110 tries in over 300 appearances.

Fairbank played second-row, and scored a try in Bradford Northern's 12–12 draw with Castleford in the 1987 Yorkshire Cup Final during the 1987–88 season at Headingley, Leeds on 17 October 1987, and played in the 11–2 victory in the replay at Elland Road, Leeds on 31 October 1987. He also played in the 20–14 victory over Featherstone Rovers in the 1989 Yorkshire Cup Final during the 1989–90 season at Headingley, Leeds on 5 November 1989.

Fairbank played second-row, in Bradford Northern's 15–8 defeat by Wigan in the 1992–93 Regal Trophy Final during the 1992–93 season at Elland Road, Leeds on Saturday 23 January 1993.

Fairbank was a substitute in Bradford Bulls's 32–40 defeat by St. Helens in the 1996 Challenge Cup Final at Wembley Stadium, London on 26 April 1996.

Fairbank announced his retirement at the end of the inaugural Super League season in 1996, with the club retiring his squad number, the number 21 shirt, in his honour. Bradford have since re-used the squad number.

Fairbank was included in Bradford's, 'Millennium Masters', 'Bull Masters', and in August 2007 he was named in the 'Team Of The Century', one of only six players have been included in all three lists.

=== International honours ===
Fairbank won caps for Great Britain while at Bradford Northern in the 1985 - 1988 Rugby League World Cup in 1987 against Papua New Guinea (sub), in 1990 against France, Papua New Guinea, and Australia (sub), in 1991 against France, in the 1989–1992 Rugby League World Cup in 1991 against Papua New Guinea (sub), in 1992 against France, in the 1989–1992 Rugby League World Cup in 1992 against France, in 1992 against Papua New Guinea, and New Zealand (sub), in 1993 against France (sub), and New Zealand (3 matches), and in 1994 against France. He was selected to go on the 1992 Great Britain Lions tour of Australia and New Zealand.

== Personal life ==
Karl Fairbank is son of the rugby league footballer for Huddersfield and Leeds; Jack Fairbank, and brother of the rugby league footballer for Leeds, Oldham and Swinton; John Fairbank, the rugby league footballer for Halifax; Dick Fairbank, and the rugby league footballer for Oldham and Keighley; Mark Fairbank, and the uncle to Mark's son, the rugby league forward; Jacob Fairbank.
