= Michael Beattie =

Michael Beattie may refer to:

- Michael Beattie (actor), Canadian actor
- Michael Beattie (rugby league) (born 1960), Australian rugby league player
