= 1992–93 Regal Trophy =

- Structure: National knockout championship
- Teams: 37
- Winners: Wigan
- Runners-up: Bradford Northern

The 1992–93 Regal Trophy was a British rugby league knockout tournament. It was the 22nd season that the competition was held, and was the fourth staging of the competition since it was renamed the Regal Trophy.

Wigan defeated Bradford Northern by the score of 15–8 in the final to claim the trophy. The match was played at Elland Road, Leeds in front of an attendance of 13,221.

== Background ==
This season saw several changes in the entrants, one club re-formed/renamed, two French clubs were invited instead of the junior clubs, and one club withdrew. This resulted in one less club/entrant reducing the total number to thirty-seven.

The changes, in detail, are:

1. Trafford Borough re-formed as Blackpool Gladiators and moved back to Blackpool, playing at Jepson Way, Blackpool
2. Two French clubs, Carcassonne and XIII Catalan were invited to join the competition, instead of the junior clubs, who were no longer invited
3. Scarborough Pirates went into administration at the end of previous season

The preliminary round involved ten clubs, to reduce the numbers of entrants to the first round proper to thirty-two.

== Competition and results ==
=== Preliminary round ===
Involved 5 matches and 10 clubs

Game No	Fixture Date	Home team	Score	Away team	Venue	Att	Rec	Notes	Ref
1	Tue 13 Oct 1992	Warrington	32-8	Blackpool Gladiators	Wilderspool	1412			
2	Tue 27 Oct 1992	Chorley Borough (2)	10-38	Sheffield Eagles	Grundy Hill	368		1	
3	Tue 27 Oct 1992	St. Helens	44-18	Huddersfield	Knowsley Road	4423			
4	Tue 27 Oct 1992	Wakefield Trinity	90-12	Highfield	Belle Vue	1650		2	
5	Wed 28 Oct 1992	Swinton	12-32	Hull Kingston Rovers	Gigg Lane	582			

=== Round 1 - First Round ===
Involved 16 matches and 32 clubs

Game No	Fixture Date	Home team	Score	Away team	Venue	Att	Rec	Notes	Ref
1	Sat 2 Nov 1992	Wigan	52-0	Carcassonne	Central Park	4306			
2	Sun 8 Nov 1992	Batley	6-13	Hunslet	Mount Pleasant	709			
3	Sun 8 Nov 1992	Bradford Northern	70-10	Barrow	Odsal	3049			
4	Sun 8 Nov 1992	Bramley	12-16	Carlisle	McLaren Field	550			
5	Sun 8 Nov 1992	Doncaster	4-30	Workington Town	Bentley Road Stadium/Tattersfield	893			
6	Sun 8 Nov 1992	Halifax	76-6	Nottingham City	Thrum Hall	3547			
7	Sun 8 Nov 1992	Hull F.C.	22-16	Dewsbury	Boulevard	2984			
8	Sun 8 Nov 1992	Hull Kingston Rovers	48-4	Whitehaven	Craven Park (2)	1627			
9	Sun 8 Nov 1992	Leigh	32-24	Keighley Cougars	Hilton Park	2113			
10	Sun 8 Nov 1992	London Crusaders	30-0	Wakefield Trinity	Crystal Palace NSC	860			
11	Sun 8 Nov 1992	Oldham	22-40	Castleford	Watersheddings	4393			
12	Sun 8 Nov 1992	Rochdale Hornets	32-16	XIII Catalan	Spotland	1507			
13	Sun 8 Nov 1992	St. Helens	15-14	Leeds	Knowsley Road	11052			
14	Sun 8 Nov 1992	Salford	14-18	Featherstone Rovers	The Willows	3088			
15	Sun 8 Nov 1992	Warrington	31-16	Sheffield Eagles	Wilderspool	3112			
16	Sun 8 Nov 1992	Widnes	46-4	Ryedale-York	Naughton Park	3475		3	

=== Round 2 - Second Round ===
Involved 8 matches and 16 clubs

Game No	Fixture Date	Home team	Score	Away team	Venue	Att	Rec	Notes	Ref
1	Sat 5 Dec 1992	Warrington	12-12	Bradford Northern	Wilderspool	2145			
2	Sun 6 Dec 1992	Castleford	54-0	Carlisle	The Jungle	2539			
3	Sun 6 Dec 1992	Featherstone Rovers	8-25	St. Helens	Post Office Road	4473			
4	Sun 6 Dec 1992	Hull F.C.	28-14	Halifax	Boulevard	5494			
5	Sun 6 Dec 1992	Hull Kingston Rovers	0-18	Wigan	Craven Park (2)	3779			
6	Sun 6 Dec 1992	Hunslet	12-34	Workington Town	Elland Road	1225			
7	Sun 6 Dec 1992	Leigh	16-6	London Crusaders	Hilton Park	2181			
8	Sun 6 Dec 1992	Widnes	30-2	Rochdale Hornets	Naughton Park	3591			

=== Round 2 - Second Round replays ===
Involved 1 match and 2 clubs

Game No	Fixture Date	Home team	Score	Away team	Venue	Att	Rec	Notes	Ref
1	Wed 16 Dec 1992	Bradford Northern	9-6	Warrington	Odsal	3474			

=== Round 3 - Quarter-finals ===
Involved 4 matches with 8 clubs

Game No	Fixture Date	Home team	Score	Away team	Venue	Att	Rec	Notes	Ref
1	Sat 19 Dec 1992	St. Helens	8–12	Castleford	Knowsley Road	4785			
2	Sun 20 Dec 1992	Hull F.C.	24–14	Leigh	Boulevard	4835			
3	Sun 20 Dec 1992	Workington Town	12–24	Wigan	Derwent Park	7682		4	
4	Tue 29 Dec 1992	Bradford Northern	21–10	Widnes	Odsal	5346			

=== Round 4 – Semi-finals ===
Involved 2 matches and 4 clubs. From this season onwards, Regal Trophy semi-finals were no longer played at neutral venues.

Game No	Fixture Date	Home team	Score	Away team	Venue	Att	Rec	Notes	Ref
1	Sat 2 Jan 1993	Wigan	19–4	Hull F.C.	Central Park	8020			
2	Sat 2 Jan 1993	Bradford Northern	19–12	Castleford	Valley Parade	5602			

=== Final ===
23 January 1993

Wigan	15 – 8	Bradford Northern
Tries: Robinson, Edwards; Goals: Botica (3); Drop goals: Hampson		Tries: McGowan; Goals: Hobbs, Mumby

Elland Road, Leeds
Attendance: 13,221
Referee: John Holdsworth (Kippax)
Player of the Match: Shaun Edwards

==== Teams and scorers ====
Wigan	No.	Bradford Northern
	Teams	
Steve Hampson	1	Dave Watson
Jason Robinson	2	Tony Marchant
Dean Bell	3	Steve McGowan
Andrew Farrar	4	Tony Anderson
Martin Offiah	5	Roger Simpson
Frano Botica	6	Neil Summers
Shaun Edwards	7	Deryck Fox
Neil Cowie	8	David Hobbs
Martin Dermott	9	Brian Noble
Andy Platt	10	Roy Powell
Denis Betts	11	Paul Medley
Billy McGinty	12	Karl Fairbank
Phil Clarke	13	David "Dave" Heron
Joe Lydon (for Martin Offiah 59-mins)	14	Keith Mumby (for Tony Anderson 44-mins)
Sam Panapa (for Phil Clarke 9-mins)	15	Trevor Clark (for Brian Noble 44-mins)
John Monie	Coach	Peter Fox

=== Prize money ===
As part of the sponsorship deal and funds, the prize money awarded to the competing teams for this season is as follows :-

Finish Position	Cash prize	No. receiving prize	Total cash
Winner	?	1	?
Runner-up	?	1	?
semi-finalist	?	2	?
loser in Rd 3	?	4	?
loser in Rd 2	?	8	?
Loser in Rd 1	?	16	?
Loser in Prelim Round	?	5	?
Grand Total			

Note - the author is unable to trace the award amounts for this season. Can anyone help ?

=== The road to success ===
This tree excludes any preliminary round fixtures

First round
Batley	6
Hunslet	13
Doncaster	4
Workington Town	30
Hull Kingston Rovers	48
Whitehaven	4
Wigan	52
Carcassonne	0
Hull F.C.	22
Dewsbury	16
Halifax	76
Nottingham City	6
Leigh	32
Keighley Cougars	24
London Crusaders	30
London Crusaders	0
Warrington	31
Sheffield Eagles	16
Bradford Northern	70
Barrow	10
Widnes	46
Ryedale-York	4
Rochdale Hornets	32
XIII Catalan	16
Salford	14
Featherstone Rovers	18
St. Helens	15
Leeds	14
Oldham	22
Castleford	40
Bramley	12
Carlisle	16

Second round
Hunslet	12
Workington Town	34
Hull Kingston Rovers	0
Wigan	18
Hull F.C.	28
Halifax	14
Leigh	16
London Crusaders	6
Warrington	12 (6)
Bradford Northern	12 (9)
Widnes	30
Rochdale Hornets	2
Featherstone Rovers	8
St. Helens	25
Castleford	54
Carlisle	0

Third round
Workington Town	12
Wigan	24
Hull F.C.	24
Leigh	14
Bradford Northern	21
Widnes	10
St. Helens	8
Castleford	12

Semi-finals
Wigan	19
Hull F.C.	4
Bradford Northern	19
Castleford	12

Final
Wigan	15
Bradford Northern	8

== Notes and comments ==
1 * Grundy Hill was the home ground of Horwich RMI, in Bolton
2 * The second highest score, at the time
3 * RUGBYLEAGUEproiject gives the attendance as 3,475 but Widnes official archives gives it as 3,343
4 * RUGBYLEAGUEproiject gives the attendance as 7,682 but Wigan official archives gives it as 8,000

== See also ==
- 1992-93 Rugby Football League season
- 1992 Lancashire Cup
- 1992 Yorkshire Cup
- Regal Trophy
- Rugby league county cups

== Sources ==
- Fletcher, Raymond; Howes, David, eds. (1993). Rothmans Rugby League Yearbook 1993-94. London: Headline Publishing Group. ISBN 978-0-7472-7890-0.
