= Neil Roebuck =

English rugby league footballer

Personal information
- Born: 4 October 1969 (age 56) Hemsworth, England

Playing information
- Position: Loose forward
Club
Years	Team	Pld	T	G	FG	P
1986–89	Bradford Northern
1989–93	Castleford	62	11	0	1	46
1993–95	Featherstone Rovers	103	11	0	0	44
	Total	165	22	0	1	90

Neil Roebuck (born 4 October 1969) is an English former professional rugby league footballer who played in the 1980s and 1990s. He played at club level for Bradford Northern, Castleford and Featherstone Rovers as a loose forward.

== Background ==
Neil Roebuck was born in Hemsworth, West Riding of Yorkshire, England.

== Playing career ==
=== County Cup Final appearances ===
During the 1987–88 season, Roebuck appeared as a substitute (replacing Loose forward Terry Holmes) in Bradford Northern's 12-12 draw with Castleford in the 1987 Yorkshire Cup Final at Headingley, Leeds on Saturday 17 October 1987, but he did not play in the replay at Elland Road, Leeds on Saturday 31 October 1987.

He played loose forward, and scored a drop goal in Castleford's 11-8 victory over Wakefield Trinity in the 1990 Yorkshire Cup Final during the 1990–91 season at Elland Road, Leeds on Sunday 23 September 1990.

=== Club career ===
Neil Roebuck was transferred from Bradford Northern to Castleford on 15 December 1989, and made his début for Castleford in the 18-25 defeat by Leeds on Tuesday 26 December 1989.
