= Brian Noble (rugby league) =

TV broadcaster, Rugby league coach and former GB rugby league international footballer

Brian Noble MBE
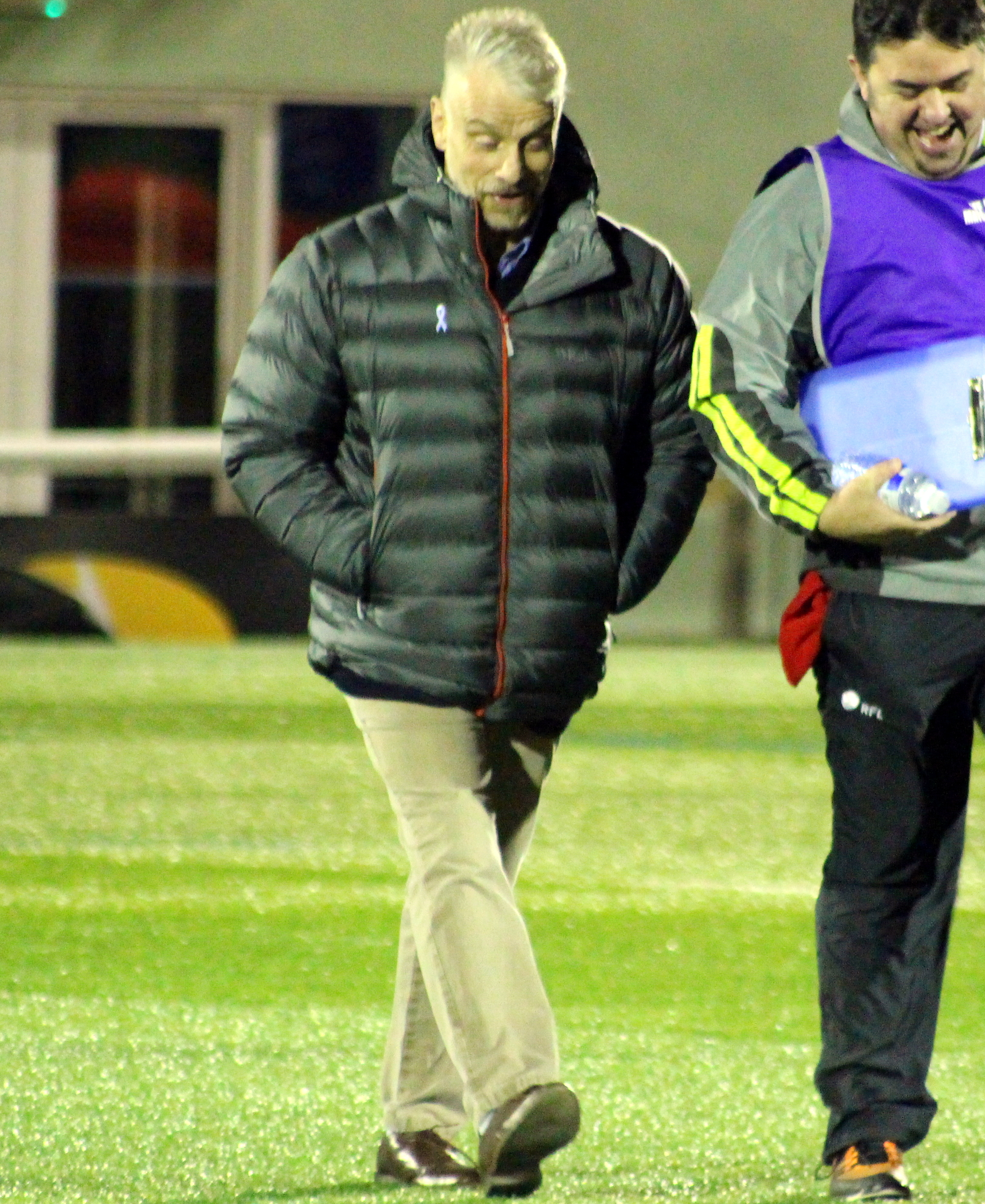

Personal information
- Full name: Brian David Noble
- Born: 14 February 1961 (age 65) Bradford, West Riding of Yorkshire, England
- Height: 5 ft 8 in (1.73 m)
- Weight: 13 st 0 lb (83 kg)

Playing information
- Position: Hooker
Club
Years	Team	Pld	T	G	FG	P
1979–93	Bradford Northern	389+3	39	0	0	145
1985	Cronulla Sharks	7	1	0	0	4
1994–95	Wakefield Trinity	8+1	0	0	0	0
	Total	408	40	0	0	149
Representative
Years	Team	Pld	T	G	FG	P
1982–84	Great Britain	11	1	0	0	4
1985–86	Yorkshire	2	0	0	0	0
1982–83	GB Under 24	4	0	0	0	0
1984	GB tour games	7	6	0	0	24

Coaching information
Club
Years	Team	Gms	W	D	L	W%
2001–06	Bradford Bulls	180	136	2	40	76
2006–09	Wigan Warriors	91	49	4	38	54
2010	Crusaders RL	31	14	0	17	45
2013–14	Salford Red Devils	23	7	0	16	30
2025	Bradford Bulls	33	24	0	9	73
	Total	358	230	6	120	64
Representative
Years	Team	Gms	W	D	L	W%
2004–06	Great Britain	14	6	0	8	43
- Source: As of 29 September 2025

Brian David Noble MBE (born 14 February 1961), also known by the nickname of "Nobby", is an English rugby league coach and former rugby league footballer. He was the former head-coach of Bradford Bulls.

As a footballer, Noble was a Great Britain representative hooker, but is best known for his coaching career, during which he coached the Bradford Bulls, the Wigan Warriors, the Crusaders RL and the Salford Red Devils in the Super League, and the Great Britain national team. He was the first coach to win three Super League Grand Finals, and is one of only two coaches to have achieved that feat along with Brian McDermott. He was formerly the Director of Rugby for the Toronto Wolfpack, and also works as a pundit for BBC Sport.

== Background ==
Noble was born in Bradford, West Riding of Yorkshire, England.

== Playing career ==
Brian Noble's early rugby league career was as a member of the Police Boys' Clubs before he signed for Bradford Northern. His début came in the 1978–79 season and was the beginning of almost 15 years and over 400 games with the club, concluding in the centenary season of 1995-96 following a spell at Wakefield Trinity.

Noble combined his professional career with his job as a policeman, and captained Great Britain on the Lions' tour of Australasia in 1984. He played in all seven tests on the tour, including the test in Papua New Guinea.

Brian Noble played hooker in Bradford Northern's 5–10 defeat by Castleford in the 1981 Yorkshire Cup Final during the 1981–82 season at Headingley, Leeds on Saturday 3 October 1981, played hooker in the 7–18 defeat by Hull F.C. in the 1982 Yorkshire Cup Final during the 1981–82 season at Elland Road, Leeds on Saturday 2 October 1982, played hooker in the 12–12 draw with Castleford in the 1987 Yorkshire Cup Final during the 1987–88 season at Headingley, Leeds on Saturday 17 October 1987, played hooker in the 11–2 victory Castleford in the 1987 Yorkshire Cup Final replay during the 1987–88 season at Elland Road, Leeds on Saturday 31 October 1987.

Brian Noble played hooker in Bradford Northern's 2–12 defeat by Warrington in the 1990–91 Regal Trophy Final during the 1990–91 season at Headingley, Leeds on Saturday 12 January 1991, and played hooker (replaced by substitute Trevor Clark) in the 15–8 defeat by Wigan in the 1992–93 Regal Trophy Final during the 1992–93 season at Elland Road, Leeds on Saturday 23 January 1993.

== Coaching career ==
=== Bradford ===
After 6 years serving in the backroom staff at the club following his retirement, he was appointed Bradford head coach in November 2000. After initial confusion regarding chairman Chris Caisley's appointment - the tabloids reported that the new coach was Radio 4 comedian Ross Noble! - he was a hugely popular choice to succeed departing coach Matthew Elliott. Noble took Bradford Bulls to the 2001 Super League Grand Final in which they defeated Wigan. As Super League VI champions, Bradford played against 2001 NRL Premiers, the Newcastle Knights in the 2002 World Club Challenge. Noble oversaw Bradford's victory. In July 2002, Noble received an honorary doctorate from the University of Bradford for his achievements as a rugby league footballer, and coach. He took Bradford to the 2002 Super League Grand Final which was lost to St. Helens. He was named Super League coach of the year in 2003 and succeeded David Waite as Great Britain coach following the 2003 Ashes series. Noble took Bradford to the Grand Final again in 2004 but lost out to local rivals Leeds Rhinos 16–8 at Old Trafford. Noble led Bradford to victory in the 2005 Super League Grand Final his third Championship in five years with the club. Noble left Bradford midway through the 2006 season to join Wigan, handing control to his assistant Steve McNamara.

While head coach of the Bradford Bulls, Noble guided them to two Minor Premiership titles, victory in three Grand Finals in 2001, 2003 and 2005, victory in the Challenge Cup in 2003 and to three World Club Championships in 2002, 2004 and 2006. In 2004 he received the Rugby League International Federation's coach of the year award.

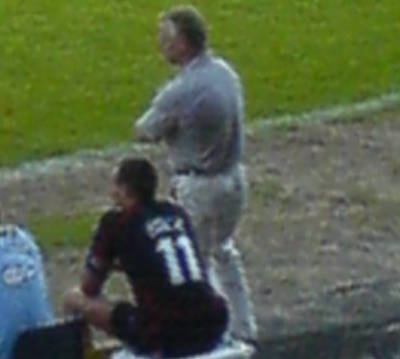
Noble coaching Wigan against Harlequins RL

=== Wigan ===
On 20 April 2006 Noble took up the position of head coach at Wigan, nine days after the sacking of Ian Millward. Brian took over at the club during a relegation battle which at one point looked as though Wigan would lose, however he has been credited for keeping Wigan in Super League following a number of impressive performance. However, despite having just £60,000 available to spend under the salary cap, Noble bought Stuart Fielden and Michael Dobson from the Bradford Bulls for a world record £450,000. At the end of the season when the club's books were audited by the league's accountants, it was found there was an unauthorised overspend of £222,314, which led to allegations that the club cheated their way out of relegation by deliberately spending money they didn't have due to salary cap restrictions. However the club was eventually only found guilty of "breaching the spirit of the cap", by trying to restructure existing contracts.

On 17 January 2007 it was announced that his contract as head coach of the British national team would not be renewed.

In October 2009, after the defeat by St Helens in the semifinal play-off game, Noble announced he would be leaving to club.

=== Crusaders RL ===
On 14 October 2009 Noble was confirmed as the new head coach of the Welsh side Crusaders. Jon Sharp was first-team coach, and Iestyn Harris was an assistant. In the 2010 season Noble managed to gain 13 wins, which was a vast improvement on the season before, and took them into the playoffs for the first time.

In November 2010, Noble confirmed his departure from Crusaders Rugby League after only one season in charge. His last match as Head Coach was an 18–12 loss away to Huddersfield in an Elimination Play-off tie.

=== Salford ===
On 13 April 2013 Noble was appointed head coach of Salford on an 18-month contract, but on 4 April 2014, Marwan Koukash announced that Noble would become the director of football at Salford, while Noble's former assistant Iestyn Harris would become the new head coach. He departed the club soon after.

=== Bradford Bulls ===
On 30 Oct 2024 Noble was appointed head coach of Bradford Bulls in the RFL Championship

=== Other positions ===
Following his departure from Salford, Noble worked in a part-time consultancy basis with London Broncos and Gloucestershire All Golds. He also served as director of rugby for the Toronto Wolfpack and has regularly appeared as a pundit and occasionally as a co-commentator on BBC Sport's rugby league coverage.

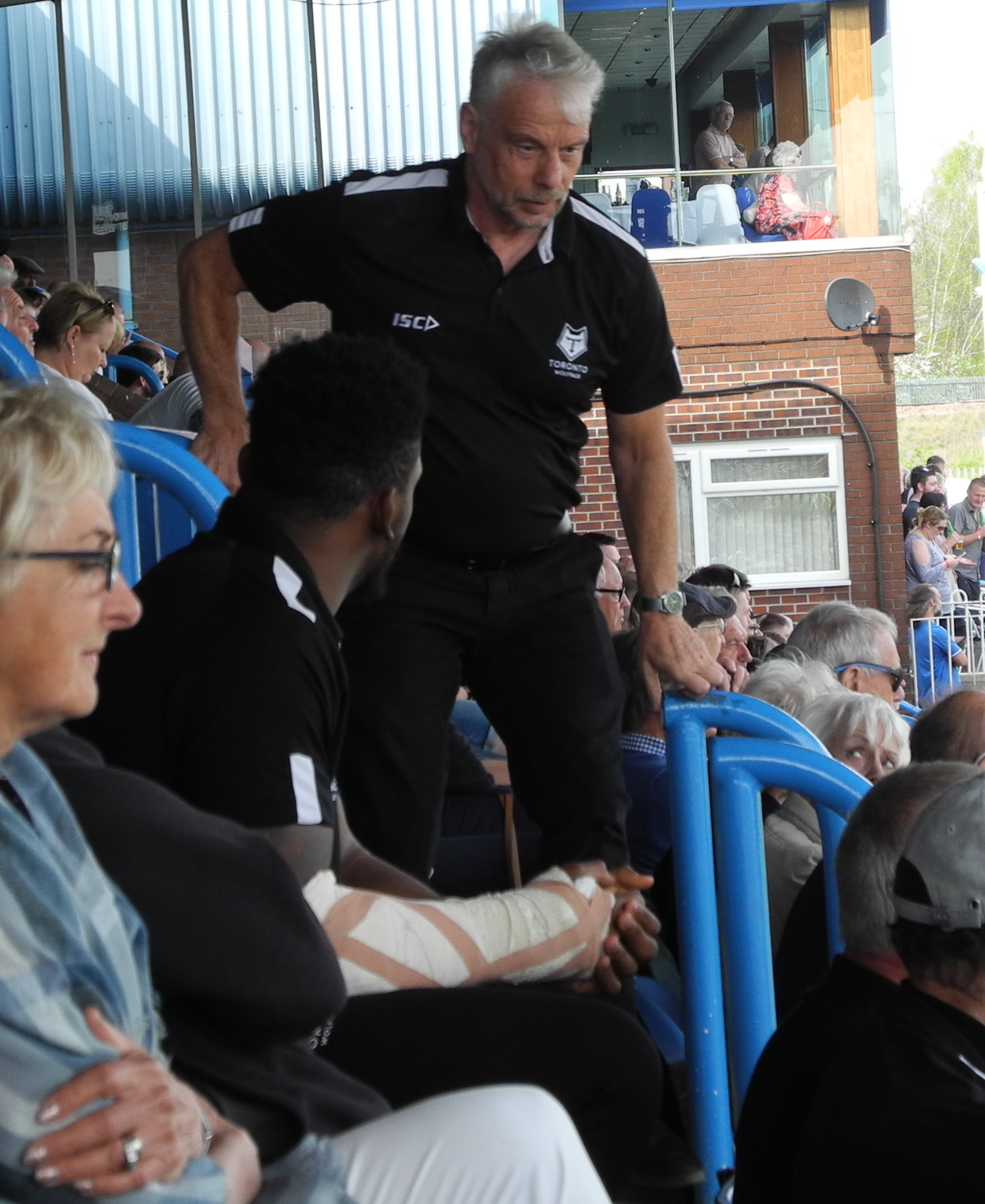
Noble with the Toronto Wolfpack in 2019

== Honours ==
Noble was appointed Member of the Order of the British Empire (MBE) in the 2017 Birthday Honours for services to rugby league and charity.

=== As a player ===
- Yorkshire Cup: 1987

=== As a coach ===
==== Team ====
- Super League (3): 2001, 2003, 2005
- World Club Challenge (3): 2002, 2004, 2006
- League Leader's Shield (2): 2001, 2003
- Challenge Cup (1): 2003

==== Individual ====
- Super League Coach of the Year: 2003
- RLIF International Coach of the Year: 2004
- Bradford Bulls Team of the Century (coach)
- Bradford Bulls Bull Masters
