= Alan Shillito =

English rugby league footballer

Personal information
- Born: 14 December 1959 (age 65)

Playing information
- Position: Prop, Second-row
Club
Years	Team	Pld	T	G	FG	P
1980–85	Halifax	57	15	0	0	55
1985	→ Keighley (loan)	3	0	4	0	8
1985–88	Castleford	52	3	0	0	12
	Total	112	18	4	0	75

Alan Shillito is a former professional rugby league footballer who played in the 1980s. He played at club level for Halifax and Castleford, as a prop or second-row.

== Playing career ==
=== County Cup Final appearances ===
Alan Shillito appeared as a substitute (replacing second-row Brett Atkins) in Castleford's 18-22 defeat by Hull Kingston Rovers in the 1985 Yorkshire Cup Final during the 1985–86 season at Headingley, Leeds, on Sunday 27 October 1985, appeared as a substitute (replacing second-row Brett Atkins) in the 31-24 victory over Hull F.C. in the 1986 Yorkshire Cup Final during the 1986–87 season at Headingley, Leeds, on Saturday 11 October 1986, and played at prop (replaced by substitute Bob Beardmore) in the 12-12 draw with Bradford Northern in the 1987 Yorkshire Cup Final during the 1987–88 season at Headingley, Leeds on Saturday 17 October 1987, but he did not play in the 2-11 defeat by Bradford Northern in the 1987 Yorkshire Cup Final replay during the 1987–88 season at Elland Road, Leeds on Saturday 31 October 1987.

=== Club career ===
Alan Shillito signed for Castleford from Halifax on Tuesday 1 October 1985. He also spent time on loan at Keighley.
