= Giles Boothroyd =

English rugby league footballer

Personal information
- Born: 17 March 1969 (age 56); Pontefract district, England

Playing information
- Position: Centre
Club
Years	Team	Pld	T	G	FG	P
1987–93	Castleford	61	24	0	0	96
1993–97	Hunslet	89	27	0	0	108
	Total	150	51	0	0	204
Representative
Years	Team	Pld	T	G	FG	P
1989	Great Britain U-21	1	0	0	0	0

Giles Boothroyd (born 17 March 1969) is an English former professional rugby league footballer who played in the 1980s and 1990s. He played at club level for Castleford and Hunslet, as a centre

== Background ==
Boothroyd's birth was registered in Pontefract district, West Riding of Yorkshire, England.

== Playing career ==
=== Club career ===
Boothroyd was signed from Lock Lane by Castleford in April 1987, and made his début for them in the 20-10 victory over St Helens on Sunday 30 August 1987.

Boothroyd appeared as a substitute (replacing Second-row Keith England) in the 2–11 defeat by Bradford Northern in the 1987 Yorkshire Cup Final replay during the 1987–88 season at Elland Road, Leeds, on Saturday 31 October 1987, and played at centre, and scored a try in the 12–33 defeat by Leeds in the 1988 Yorkshire Cup Final during the 1988–89 season at Elland Road on Sunday 16 October 1988.
