= 1986–87 Yorkshire Cup =

1986 Yorkshire Cup
- Structure: Regional knockout championship
- Teams: 18
- Winners: Castleford
- Runners-up: Hull F.C.

The 1986–87 Yorkshire Cup was the seventy-ninth occasion on which the Yorkshire Cup competition was held. This season there were no junior/amateur clubs taking part, and no "leavers", but another new entrant in the form of Mansfield Marksman and so the total of entries increases by one up to eighteen. This in turn resulted in the necessity to increase the number of matches in the preliminary round to reduce the number of clubs entering the first round to sixteen.

In a repeat of the 1983–84 Yorkshire Cup's final pairing, Castleford turned the tables, reversing the result and beating Hull F.C. by the score of 31–24 to win the trophy. The match was played at Headingley, Leeds, now in West Yorkshire. The attendance was 11,132 and receipts were £31,888. This was the fourth time in the incredible eleven-year period in which Castleford. previously only once winners in 1977, will make eight appearances in the Yorkshire Cup final, winning on four and ending as runner-up on four occasions.

== Background ==
The Rugby League Yorkshire Cup competition was a knock-out competition between (mainly professional) rugby league clubs from the county of Yorkshire. The actual area was at times increased to encompass other teams from outside the county such as Newcastle, Mansfield, Coventry, and even London (in the form of Acton & Willesden).

The Rugby League season always (until the onset of "Summer Rugby" in 1996) ran from around August-time through to around May-time and this competition always took place early in the season, in the Autumn, with the final taking place in (or just before) December (The only exception to this was when disruption of the fixture list was caused during, and immediately after, the two World Wars)

== Competition and results ==
=== Preliminary round ===
Involved 2 matches and 4 clubs

Game No	Fixture Date	Home team	Score	Away team	Venue	Att	Rec	Notes	Ref
P1	Sun 17 Aug 1986	Halifax	56–0	Mansfield Marksman	Thrum Hall	2962		(Note: The first Yorkshire Cup match to be played by newly elected to the league Mansfield Marksman)	
P2	Wed 3 Sep 1986	Sheffield Eagles	22–20	Doncaster	Owlerton Stadium	654		(Note: This is the first Yorkshire Cup match played at Sheffield Eagles' Owlerton Stadium)	

=== Round 1 ===
Involved 8 matches (with no byes) and 16 clubs

Game No	Fixture Date	Home team	Score	Away team	Venue	Att	Rec	Notes	Ref
1	Fri 12 Sep 1986	Leeds	40–4	Keighley	Headingley	2862			
2	Sun 14 Sep 1986	Batley	12–14	Wakefield Trinity	Mount Pleasant	1502			
3	Sun 14 Sep 1986	Castleford	16–10	Halifax	Wheldon Road	7594			
4	Sun 14 Sep 1986	Featherstone Rovers	40–13	York	Post Office Road	1732			
5	Sun 14 Sep 1986	Hull F.C.	29–22	Bramley	Boulevard	3580			
6	Sun 14 Sep 1986	Hull Kingston Rovers	52–30	Huddersfield Barracudas	Craven Park (1)	3736			
7	Sun 14 Sep 1986	Hunslet	12–40	Bradford Northern	Elland Road	3101			
8	Sun 14 Sep 1986	Sheffield Eagles	9–10	Dewsbury	Owlerton Stadium	641			

=== Round 2 - Quarter-finals ===
Involved 4 matches and 8 clubs

Game No	Fixture Date	Home team	Score	Away team	Venue	Att	Rec	Notes	Ref
1	Wed 24 Sep 1986	Bradford Northern	42–10	Dewsbury	Odsal	2682			
2	Wed 24 Sep 1986	Castleford	38–16	Leeds	Wheldon Road	7198			
3	Wed 24 Sep 1986	Hull F.C.	21–12	Wakefield Trinity	Boulevard	3737			
4	Wed 24 Sep 1986	Hull Kingston Rovers	20–20	Featherstone Rovers	Craven Park (1)	3841			

=== Round 2 - replays ===
Involved 1 match and 2 clubs

Game No	Fixture Date	Home team	Score	Away team	Venue	Att	Rec	Notes	Ref
R	Fri 26 Sep 1986	Featherstone Rovers	23–12	Hull Kingston Rovers	Post Office Road	2385			

=== Round 3 – Semi-finals ===
Involved 2 matches and 4 clubs

Game No	Fixture Date	Home team	Score	Away team	Venue	Att	Rec	Notes	Ref
1	Wed 1 Oct 1986	Bradford Northern	12–16	Hull F.C.	Odsal	4727			
2	Wed 1 Oct 1986	Featherstone Rovers	2–30	Castleford	Post Office Road	5523			

=== Final ===
Game No	Fixture Date	Home team	Score	Away team	Venue	Att	Rec	Notes	Ref
	Saturday 11 October 1986	Castleford	31–24	Hull F.C.	Headingley	11,132	£31,888	(Note: Headingley, Leeds, is the home ground of Leeds RLFC with a capacity of 21,000. The record attendance was 40,175 for a league match between Leeds and Bradford Northern on 21 May 1947.)	

==== Teams and scorers ====
Castleford	No.	Hull F.C.
	teams	
Colin Scott	1	Gary Kemble
David Plange	2	Michael Brand
Tony Marchant	3	Garry Schofield
Chris Johns	4	Dane O'Hara
Gary Hyde	5	Paul Eastwood
John Joyner	6	Fred Ah Kuoi
Robert "Bob" Beardmore	7	Phil Windley
Kevin Ward	8	David Brown
Kevin Beardmore	9	Shaun Patrick
Barry Johnson	10	Andy Dannatt (Sent off)
Martin Ketteridge	11	Steve 'Knocker' Norton
Brett Atkins	12	Lee Crooks
Keith England	13	Jon Sharp
Gary Lord (for Gary Hyde)	14	Gary Divorty (for Steve Norton)
Alan Shillito (for Brett Atkins)	15	Neil Puckering (for Dave Brown)
Malcolm "Mal" Reilly	Coach	Len Casey
31	score	24
12	HT	18
	Scorers	
	Tries	
Kevin Ward (1)	T	Mike Brand (2)
Kevin Beardmore (2)	T	Dane O'Hara (2)
Martin Ketteridge (1)	T	
Brett Atkins (1)	T	
	Goals	
Martin Ketteridge (5)	G	Lee Crooks (4)
	Drop Goals	
Robert "Bob" Beardmore (1)	DG	
Referee		John McDonald (Wigan)
White Rose Trophy for Man of the match		Kevin Beardmore - Castleford - Hooker
sponsored by		
Competition Sponsor		John Smith's Brewery Tadcaster

Scoring - Try = four points - Goal = two points - Drop goal = one point

=== The road to success ===
The following chart excludes any preliminary round fixtures/results

First round
Hull Kingston Rovers	52
Huddersfield Barracudas	30
Featherstone Rovers	40
York	13
Castleford	16
Halifax	10
Leeds	40
Keighley	4
Hunslet	12
Bradford Northern	40
Sheffield Eagles	9
Dewsbury	10
Hull F.C.	29
Bramley	22
Batley	12
Wakefield Trinity	14

Second round
Hull Kingston Rovers	20 (12)
Featherstone Rovers	20 (23)
Castleford	38
Leeds	16
Bradford Northern	42
Dewsbury	10
Hull F.C.	21
Wakefield Trinity	12

Semi-finals
Featherstone Rovers	2
Castleford	30
Bradford Northern	12
Hull F.C.	16

Final
Castleford	31
Hull F.C.	24

== See also ==
- 1986–87 Rugby Football League season
- Rugby league county cups
