= David Plange =

English RL coach and former GB international rugby league footballer

Personal information
- Full name: David Apatu Plange
- Born: 24 July 1965 (age 60); Hull, England

Playing information
- Position: Wing
Club
Years	Team	Pld	T	G	FG	P
1982–84	Doncaster	31	5	0	0	20
1985–91	Castleford	193	98	4	0	402
1991–94	Sheffield Eagles	85	47	1	0	190
1994–96	Hull Kingston Rovers	54	63	0	0	252
1996–01	Hunslet Hawks	81	58	1	0	234
	Total	444	271	6	0	1098
Representative
Years	Team	Pld	T	G	FG	P
1988	Great Britain	2	1	0	0	4

Coaching information
Club
Years	Team	Gms	W	D	L	W%
1996–00	Hunslet Hawks
2002	Warrington Wolves	16	4	0	12	25
	Total	16	4	0	12	25

David Apatu Plange (born 24 July 1965) is an English former professional rugby league footballer who played in the 1980s and 1990s, and coached in the 1990s and 2000s. He played at representative level for Great Britain, and at club level for Doncaster, Castleford, Sheffield Eagles, Hull Kingston Rovers and Hunslet Hawks as a wing, and coached at club level for Hunslet Hawks, Leeds Rhinos (Head of Development/Academy Coach), and Warrington Wolves.

== Background ==
David Plange was born in Hull, East Riding of Yorkshire, England. His father came to Hull from Ghana to study law and met David's mother there.

== Playing career ==
=== International honours ===
David Plange won a cap for Great Britain while at Castleford in 1988 against France, and represented Great Britain while at Castleford in 1988 against Rest of the World.

=== Challenge Cup Final appearances ===
David Plange played on the wing in Castleford's 15-14 victory over Hull Kingston Rovers in the 1986 Challenge Cup Final during the 1985–86 season at Wembley Stadium, London on Saturday 3 May 1986.

=== County Cup Final appearances ===
David Plange played on the wing in Castleford's 18-22 defeat by Hull Kingston Rovers in the 1985 Yorkshire Cup Final during the 1985–86 season at Headingley, Leeds on Sunday 27 October 1985, played on the wing in the 31-24 victory over Hull F.C. in the 1986 Yorkshire Cup Final during the 1986–87 season at Headingley, Leeds on Saturday 11 October 1986, played on the wing and scored a try in the 12-12 draw with Bradford Northern in the 1987 Yorkshire Cup Final during the 1987–88 season at Headingley, Leeds on Saturday 17 October 1987, played on the wing in the 2-11 defeat by Bradford Northern in the 1987 Yorkshire Cup Final replay during the 1987–88 season at Elland Road, Leeds on Saturday 31 October 1987, played on the wing in the 12-33 defeat by Leeds in the 1988 Yorkshire Cup Final during the 1988–89 season at Elland Road, Leeds on Sunday 16 October 1988, and played on the wing and scored a try in the 11-8 victory over Wakefield Trinity in the 1990 Yorkshire Cup Final during the 1990–91 season at Elland Road, Leeds on Sunday 23 September 1990.

== Post-rugby career ==
Plange is the owner and chief pilot of Alpha2Bravo, a worldwide aircraft delivery service.
