= Andrew Farrar =

Australian rugby league footballer and coach

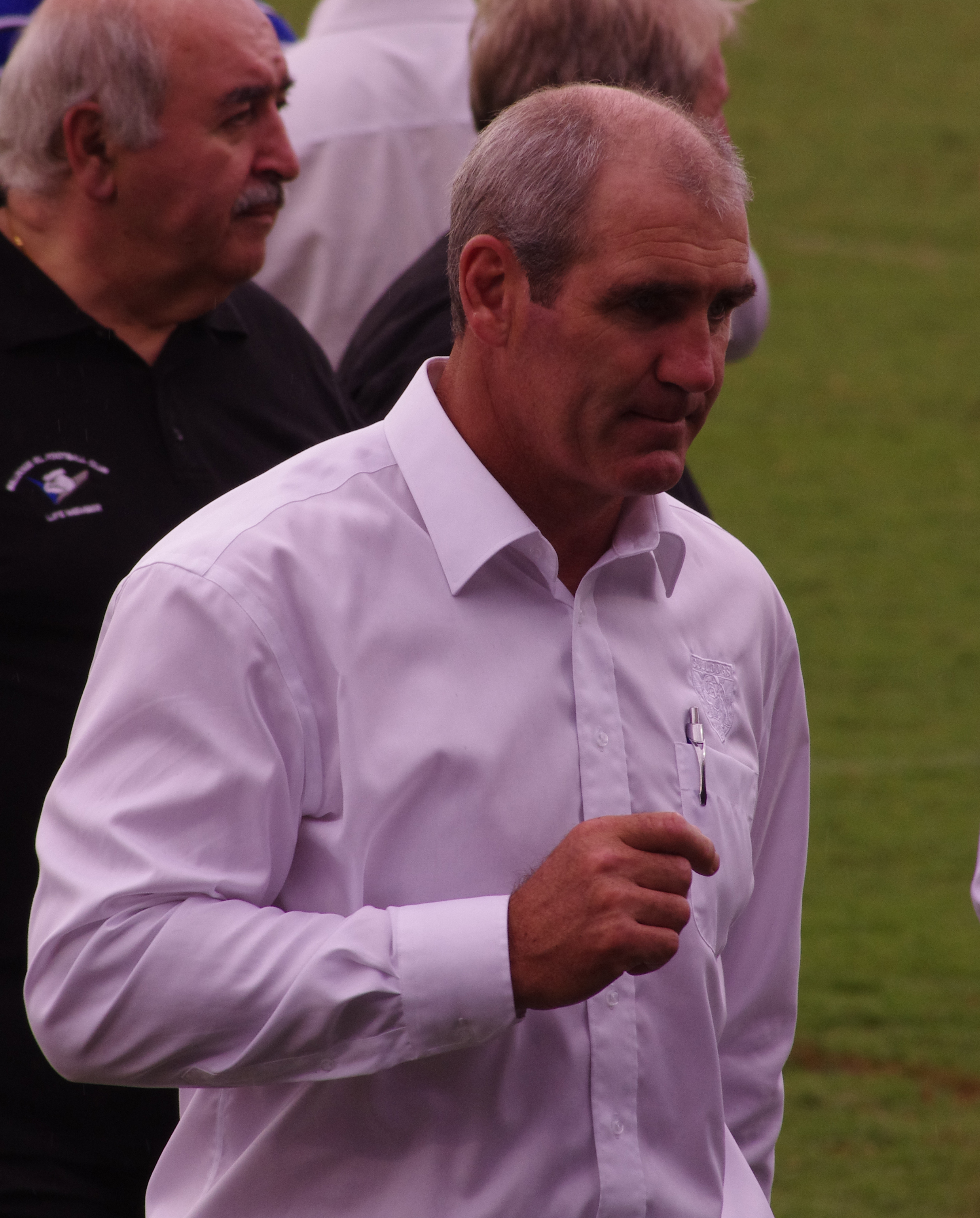
- Andrew Farrar in February 2012

Personal information
- Born: 17 May 1962 (age 64) Cowra, New South Wales, Australia

Playing information
- Height: 183 cm (6 ft 0 in)
- Weight: 92 kg (14 st 7 lb)
- Position: Centre, Wing
Club
Years	Team	Pld	T	G	FG	P
1981–90	Canterbury Bulldogs	186	39	34	1	224
1991–92	Western Suburbs	43	7	0	2	30
1992–93	Wigan	38	13	0	0	52
1994	Illawarra Steelers	22	3	0	0	12
	Total	289	62	34	3	318
Representative
Years	Team	Pld	T	G	FG	P
1984–91	NSW Country	5	2	0	0	8
1984–90	New South Wales	7	3	0	0	12
1988	Australia	1	0	0	0	0
1985	NSW City	1	0	0	0	0

Coaching information
Club
Years	Team	Gms	W	D	L	W%
1997–98	Illawarra Steelers	47	21	4	22	45
2000–02	St. George Illawarra	59	25	5	29	42
	Total	106	46	9	51	43
- Relatives: Ben Farrar (nephew)

Andrew Farrar is an Australian former rugby league footballer and coach. He played for the Canterbury-Bankstown Bulldogs, Western Suburbs, Wigan and the Illawarra Steelers. Farrar also played for New South Wales in the State of Origin on several occasions and played for Australia in the 1988 World Cup Final. As a coach he worked with the Illawarra Steelers, the St. George Illawarra Dragons and the Wigan Warriors, and from 2017 to 2019 was the general manager of football at the Canterbury-Bankstown Bulldogs.

== Playing career ==
While attending Cowra High School, Farrar played for the Australian Schoolboys team in 1979. Farrar played the majority of his career at Canterbury-Bankstown Bulldogs, enjoying 11 seasons at Canterbury. He played his first match for the club in 1981, and finished up in 1990. In that time he played in 186 first grade matches for the club. In 1991, he joined the Western Suburbs, staying there for two years.

=== England ===
In late 1992, he went to England to play for the Wigan club. Farrar played centre, in Wigan's 5–4 victory over St. Helens in the 1992 Lancashire Cup Final during the 1992–93 season at Knowsley Road, St. Helens on Sunday 18 October 1992. Andrew Farrar played left-centre in the 15–8 victory over Bradford Northern in the 1992–93 Regal Trophy Final during the 1992–93 season at Elland Road, Leeds on Saturday 23 January 1993.

In 1994, he returned to Australia, and played his last season for the Illawarra Steelers.

== Coaching career ==
Farrar became coach for the Illawarra Steelers in 1997. He was coach for the club for two seasons. In 1999, the Steelers formed a joint venture with the St. George Dragons to become a new entity – the St. George Illawarra Dragons. In 1999 and the first half of 2000, he was the assistant coach of the club. He then became head coach (in mid-2000) until 2002.

Farrar returned to Canterbury in 2008 when he was elected to the Board of Directors at the Bulldogs Annual General Meeting on 17 February.

== Sources ==
- Alan Whiticker & Glen Hudson (2007). The Encyclopedia of Rugby League Players. Wetherill Park, New South Wales: Gary Allen Pty Ltd. ISBN 978-1-877082-93-1.
