= 1988–89 Yorkshire Cup =

- Structure: Regional knockout championship
- Teams: 18
- Winners: Leeds
- Runners-up: Castleford

The 1988–89 Yorkshire Cup was the eighty-first occasion on which the Yorkshire Cup rugby league competition was held.

Leeds won the trophy by beating the previous season's runner-up, Castleford, with a score of 33–12.
The match was played at Elland Road, Leeds, now in West Yorkshire. The attendance was 22,968 and receipts were £83,591.
This was the sixth time in an eleven-year period in which Castleford, previously only winners once (in 1977), made eight appearances in the Yorkshire Cup final, winning four and finishing runners-up on the other four occasions. It was also the second season in succession that Castleford appeared, and lost, in the final within that eleven-year period.

== Background ==
In the 1988–89 season there were no junior/amateur clubs taking part, no new entrants and no "leavers" and so the total of entries remained the same at eighteen.
As a result, a preliminary round was required to reduce the number of clubs entering the first round to sixteen.

== Competition and results ==
=== Preliminary round ===
Involved 2 matches and 4 clubs

Game No	Fixture Date	Home team	Score	Away team	Venue	Att	Rec	Notes	Ref
P1	Wed 31 Aug 1988	Bramley	16–38	Leeds	McLaren Field	4,258			
P2	Wed 31 Aug 1988	Sheffield Eagles	8–28	Wakefield Trinity	Owlerton Stadium	1,356			

=== Round 1 ===
Involved 5 matches (with three byes) and 13 clubs

Game No	Fixture Date	Home team	Score	Away team	Venue	Att	Rec	Notes	Ref
1	Sun 18 Sep 1988	Castleford	94–12	Huddersfield	Wheldon Road	3,144		(Note: The first Yorkshire Cup match played by the newly renamed Huddersfield who dropped the "Barracudas"'s suffix) (Note: The record score (and highest winning margin) at the time for a Yorkshire Cup match, beating the previous record win of 79-5 (1948))	
2	Sun 18 Sep 1988	Featherstone Rovers	38–8	Doncaster	Post Office Road	2,682			
3	Sun 18 Sep 1988	Halifax	36–14	Batley	Thrum Hall	5,370			
4	Sun 18 Sep 1988	Hull F.C.	53–0	Hunslet	Boulevard	3,153			
5	Sun 18 Sep 1988	Keighley	22–28	Hull Kingston Rovers	Lawkholme Lane	1,596			
6	Sun 18 Sep 1988	Leeds	24–21	Bradford Northern	Headingley	10,992			
7	Sun 18 Sep 1988	Wakefield Trinity	46–20	Dewsbury	Belle Vue	3,733			
8	Sun 18 Sep 1988	York	25–4	Mansfield Marksman	Clarence Street	1,370			

=== Round 2 - Quarter-finals ===
Involved 4 matches and 8 clubs

Game No	Fixture Date	Home team	Score	Away team	Venue	Att	Rec	Notes	Ref
1	Tue 27 Sep 1988	Hull F.C.	18–0	Featherstone Rovers	Boulevard	4,010			
2	Wed 28 Sep 1988	Castleford	40–14	York	Wheldon Road	3,155			
3	Wed 28 Sep 1988	Halifax	24–2	Hull Kingston Rovers	Thrum Hall	6,296			
4	Wed 28 Sep 1988	Leeds	15–10	Wakefield Trinity	Headingley	11,150			

=== Round 3 – Semi-finals ===
Involved 2 matches and 4 clubs

Game No	Fixture Date	Home team	Score	Away team	Venue	Att	Rec	Notes	Ref
1	Wed 5 Oct 1988	Halifax	8–12	Castleford	Thrum Hall	8,432			
2	Wed 5 Oct 1988	Leeds	12–8	Hull F.C.	Headingley	10,384			

=== Final ===
Game No	Fixture Date	Home team	Score	Away team	Venue	Att	Rec	Notes	Ref
	Sunday 16 October 1988	Leeds	33–12	Castleford	Elland Road	22,968	£83.591	(Note: The receipts are given as £76,658 by the Rothmans Rugby League Yearbook of 1991-92 and 1990-91 but the details given in a section of the Huddersfield v Ryedale-York match programme for the preliminary round on Sunday 23 August 1992 (and all verified by The Rugby League Record Keepers Club), show the receipts as £83,591)	

==== Teams and scorers ====
Leeds	№	Castleford
	teams	
Gary Spencer	1	Gary Belcher
Andrew Ettingshausen	2	David Plange
Garry Schofield	3	Tony Marchant
David Stephenson	4	Giles Boothroyd
Carl Gibson	5	Chris Chapman
Cliff Lyons	6	Grant Anderson
Ray Ashton	7	Robert "Bob" Beardmore
Lee Crooks	8	Kevin Ward
Colin Maskill	9	Kevin Beardmore
Hugh Waddell	10	Keith England
Roy Powell	11	Martin Ketteridge
Mark Brooke-Cowden	12	Ron Gibbs
David Heron	13	John Joyner
Paul Medley (for Mark Brooke-Cowden)	14	David Roockley (for Chris Chapman)
Sam Backo (for Hugh Waddell)	15	Dean Sampson (for David Roockley)
Malcolm "Mal" Reilly	Coach	Darryl van der Velde
33	score	12
15	HT	12
	Scorers	
	Tries	
Garry Schofield (2)	T	Giles Boothroyd (1)
Carl Gibson (2)	T	John Joyner (1)
Paul Medley (1)	T	
	Goals	
David Stephenson (6)	G	Martin Ketteridge (2)
	Drop Goals	
Garry Schofield (1)	DG	
Referee		Robin Whitfield (Widnes)
White Rose Trophy for Man of the match		Cliff Lyons - Leeds - stand-off
sponsored by		
Competition Sponsor		John Smith's Brewery Tadcaster

Scoring - Try = four points - Goal = two points - Drop goal = one point

=== The road to success ===
The following chart excludes any preliminary round fixtures/results

First round
Leeds	24
Bradford Northern	21
Wakefield Trinity	46
Dewsbury	20
Hull F.C.	53
Hunslet	0
Featherstone Rovers	38
Doncaster	8
Halifax	36
Batley	14
Keighley	22
Hull Kingston Rovers	28
Castleford	94
Huddersfield	12
York	25
Mansfield Marksman	4

Second round
Leeds	15
Wakefield Trinity	10
Hull F.C.	18
Featherstone Rovers	0
Halifax	24
Hull Kingston Rovers	2
Castleford	40
York	14

Semi-finals
Leeds	12
Hull F.C.	8
Halifax	8
Castleford	12

Final
Leeds	33
Castleford	12

== See also ==
- 1988–89 Rugby Football League season
- Rugby league county cups
