= Paul Harkin =

English RL coach and former GB international rugby league footballer (born 1958)

Personal information
- Full name: Paul Harkin
- Born: 8 March 1958 (age 68) Wakefield district, England

Playing information
- Position: Scrum-half
Club
Years	Team	Pld	T	G	FG	P
1975–78	Bradford Northern	16	0	0	1	1
1978–87	Hull Kingston Rovers	168	24	0	38	125
1983	→ Featherstone Rovers (loan)	3	0	0	0	0
1985	Fortitude Valley	4	0	0	0	0
1987–90	Bradford Northern	102	20	6	21	113
1990–91	Leeds	30	1	0	2	6
1991–92	Halifax	28	1	0	0	4
1992–94	Hunslet	41	3	0	3	3
	Total	392	49	6	65	252
Representative
Years	Team	Pld	T	G	FG	P
1985	Great Britain	1	0	0	0	0

Coaching information
Club
Years	Team	Gms	W	D	L	W%
1995–96	Wakefield Trinity	12	2	0	10	17
- Relatives: Kevin Harkin (cousin)

Paul Harkin (born 8 March 1958) is an English former professional rugby league footballer who played in the 1970s, 1980s and 1990s, and coached in the 1990s. He played at representative level for Great Britain, and at club level for Bradford Northern (two spells), Featherstone Rovers, Hull Kingston Rovers, Leeds, Halifax, and Hunslet, as a scrum-half, and coached at club level for Wakefield Trinity.

== Background ==
Paul Harkin's birth was registered in Wakefield district, West Riding of Yorkshire, England.

== Playing career ==
=== Early career ===
Harkin made his professional debut for Bradford Northern in October 1975.

=== Hull Kingston Rovers ===
In December 1978, Harkin was sold to Hull Kingston Rovers in exchange for Len Casey.

During the 1980–81 season, Harkin played scrum-half in Hull Kingston Rovers' 7–8 defeat by Leeds in the 1980–81 Yorkshire Cup Final at Fartown Ground, Huddersfield on Saturday 8 November 1980, and played scrum-half in Hull Kingston Rovers' 9–18 defeat by Widnes in the 1980–81 Challenge Cup Final at Wembley Stadium, London on Saturday 2 May 1981, in front of a crowd of 92,496.

Harkin played scrum-half (replaced by substitute Chris Burton) in Hull Kingston Rovers' 4–12 defeat by Hull F.C. in the 1981–82 John Player Trophy Final during the 1981–82 season at Headingley, Leeds on Saturday 23 January 1982.

In April 1983, he spent a month on loan at Featherstone Rovers.

During the 1984–85 season, Harkin played scrum-half (replaced by substitute Chris Rudd) in the 12–29 defeat by Hull F.C. in the 1984–85 Yorkshire Cup Final at Boothferry Park, Kingston upon Hull on Saturday 27 October 1984, and played scrum-half, and was man of the match in the 12–0 victory over Hull F.C. in the 1984–85 John Player Special Trophy Final at Boothferry Park, Kingston upon Hull on Saturday 26 January 1985.

During the 1985–86 season, Harkin played scrum-half in the 22–18 victory over Castleford in the 1985–86 Yorkshire Cup Final at Headingley, Leeds on Sunday 27 October 1985, played scrum-half, and was man of the match in the 8–11 defeat by Wigan in the 1985–86 John Player Special Trophy Final at Elland Road, Leeds on Saturday 11 January 1986, and played scrum-half in the 14–15 defeat by Castleford in the 1985–86 Challenge Cup Final at Wembley Stadium, London, on Saturday 3 May 1986, in front of a crowd of 82,134.

=== Bradford Northern ===
In March 1987, Harkin returned to Bradford Northern, signing for a transfer fee of around £40,000.

In the 1987–88 season, Harkin played scrum-half and was man of the match (winning the White Rose Trophy) in Bradford Northern's 12–12 draw with Castleford in the 1987–88 Yorkshire Cup Final at Headingley, Leeds on Saturday 17 October 1987, and played scrum-half in the 11–2 victory over Castleford in the replay at Elland Road, Leeds on Saturday 31 October 1987

He played scrum-half, scored 2-tries, and was awarded the White Rose Trophy for the second time in the 20–14 victory over Featherstone Rovers in the 1989–90 Yorkshire Cup Final during the 1989–90 season at Headingley, Leeds on Sunday 5 November 1989.

=== Later career ===
Harkin signed for Leeds in June 1990. The transfer fee was set at £65,000 by an independent tribunal. He left the club a year later, joining Halifax for a fee of £30,000.

In August 1992, Harkin was transfer listed by Halifax following the signing of Paul Bishop, and was eventually sold to Hunslet, where he finished his playing career.

=== International honours ===
Harkin won a cap for Great Britain while at Hull Kingston Rovers in 1985 against France.

== Coaching career ==
Harkin coached Wakefield Trinity between January 1995 and January 1996.

He later joined the coaching staff at Bradford Bulls.

== Family ==
Harkin is the younger brother of Terry Harkin, and the cousin of Kevin P. Harkin, both rugby league footballers.
