= Michael Beattie (rugby league) =

Australian rugby league footballer

Personal information
- Full name: Michael Beattie
- Born: 1 July 1960 (age 64); Australia

Playing information
- Position: Centre
Club
Years	Team	Pld	T	G	FG	P
1980–92	St. George Dragons	211	63	0	3	245
1987–88	Castleford	20	10	0	0	40
	Total	231	73	0	3	285

Michael Beattie (born 1 July 1960) is an Australian former professional rugby league footballer who played in the 1980s and 1990s. He played at club level for the St. George Dragons (captain) and Castleford.

== Playing career ==
=== St. George career ===
Michael Beattie initially played for Bexley Kingsgrove and Brighton Seagulls in the St. George Junior Rugby League, but began his senior career playing five-eighth for Wollongong Wests. In 1980, he debuted with St. George, where he formed strong centre partnerships with Steve Rogers, Brian Johnston, Michael O'Connor, Chris Johns and Mark Coyne during the 1980s and early 1990s.

Coached by Roy Masters, he played at centre in the 6–7 defeat by Canterbury-Bankstown in the Grand final during the 1985 NSWRL season.

=== Castleford ===
Beattie signed for Castleford on 1 June 1987.

Michael Beattie played at centre in Castleford's 12–12 draw with Bradford Northern in the 1987 Yorkshire Cup Final during the 1987–88 season at Headingley, Leeds, on Saturday 17 October 1987, played at centre in the 2–11 defeat by Bradford Northern in the 1987 Yorkshire Cup Final replay during the 1987–88 season at Elland Road, Leeds, on Saturday 31 October 1987.

=== Later playing and media career ===
Continuing at St. George, he was named “Captain Of The Year” in the 1992 Dally M Awards, coached by Brian Smith and was captain in the 8–28 defeat by Brisbane in the 1992 grand final, after which he retired from playing.

Beattie then worked for the radio station 2UE, and later became an assistant-coach to Wayne Pearce at Balmain for a short period.

With 211 appearances, Beattie was — when the club merged with Illawarra after the 1998 season — fifth on St. George's "Most Career Appearances" list behind; Norm Provan (256), Billy Smith (234), Craig Young (234), and Graeme Langlands (227).

Michael Beattie was awarded Life Membership of St. George in 1990.
