= David Roockley =

English rugby league footballer

Personal information
- Born: 5 January 1963 (age 62)

Playing information
- Position: Fullback
Club
Years	Team	Pld	T	G	FG	P
1982–89	Castleford	159	43	25	2	224
1991–92	Scarborough Pirates	22	5	4	0	28
1992–93	Doncaster	15	1	2	0	8
	Total	196	49	31	2	260
Representative
Years	Team	Pld	T	G	FG	P
1988	Yorkshire	1	0	0	0	0

David Roockley is a former professional rugby league footballer who played in the 1980s. He played at representative level for Yorkshire, and at club level for Castleford, Scarborough Pirates and Doncaster as a fullback.

== Playing career ==
=== County honours ===
Roockley won a cap playing Fullback for Yorkshire while at Castleford in the 24-14 victory over Lancashire at Leeds' stadium on 21 September 1988.

=== Challenge Cup Final appearances ===
Roockley appeared as a substitute (replacing Fullback Gary Lord) in Castleford's 15-14 victory over Hull Kingston Rovers in the 1986 Challenge Cup Final during the 1985–86 season at Wembley Stadium, London on Saturday 3 May 1986, in front of a crowd of 82,134.

=== County Cup Final appearances ===
Roockley played fullback in Castleford's 12-12 draw with Bradford Northern in the 1987 Yorkshire Cup Final during the 1987–88 season at Headingley, Leeds on Saturday 17 October 1987, played fullback in the 2-11 defeat by Bradford Northern in the 1987 Yorkshire Cup Final replay during the 1987–88 season at Elland Road, Leeds on Saturday 31 October 1987, and appeared as a substitute (replacing Wing Chris Chapman) in the 12-33 defeat by Leeds in the 1988 Yorkshire Cup Final during the 1988–89 season at Elland Road, Leeds on Sunday 16 October 1988.
