= Terry Holmes =

GB & Wales international rugby union & league footballer

- Born: Terence Holmes; 10 March 1957 (age 69) Cardiff, Wales
- Height: 6 ft 1 in (1.85 m)
- Weight: 13 st 12 lb (88 kg)
- School: Bishop Hannon, Cardiff.

Rugby union career
- Position: Scrum half
Senior career
Years	Team	Apps	(Points)
1975-85	Cardiff	214	(568)
International career
Years	Team	Apps	(Points)
1978–85	Wales	25	(36)
1980-83	British Lions	1	(0)
- Rugby league career

Playing information
- Position: Loose forward
Club
Years	Team	Pld	T	G	FG	P
1985–87	Bradford	36	9			36

Terence David Holmes (born 10 March 1957) is a Welsh former rugby union and rugby league player who won 25 caps for Wales as a scrum-half, and later played rugby league for Bradford Northern.

Holmes was a highly physical player and being taller and heavier than most scrum halves of the time, he was known for his frequent close range tries especially following pick up from the back of the scrum and the break down. Holmes was a member of the first round of players to be inducted into the Cardiff RFC Hall of Fame.

== Background ==
Terry Holmes was born in Cardiff, Wales.

== Youth career ==
Holmes joined the Cardiff Youth side at the age of sixteen and also played for Wales Youth from 1974 to 1976 and in that time won a record number of caps.

== Cardiff RFC ==
Holmes played his entire rugby union career at Cardiff, the city of his birth. Following his appearances for the Youth team he appeared 214 times for the senior Cardiff RFC team, scoring 142 tries and was a key figure in the very successful Cardiff team during that period. During Holmes' time at Cardiff, the team won the Welsh Cup in 1981,1982 and 1984 and were finalists in 1977 and 1985. Holmes was club captain for the 1984–5 season.

== Wales and the British and Irish Lions ==
At the age of 21, Holmes was given the task of filling the Wales scrum-half position after the retirement of Gareth Edwards, and he won his first cap for Wales in 1978 against Australia, scoring a try.

He went on to play in the Triple Crown winning side of 1979. He won 25 caps for Wales playing his last match against Fiji in 1985, and scored 9 tries for Wales. He captained Wales for five matches in 1985 before leaving rugby union later that same year.

Holmes also played for the British and Irish Lions on their 1980 tour to South Africa and 1983 tour to New Zealand. He made one Test appearance (against New Zealand in 1983, the Lions losing 16–12) but was forced to return home early through injury from both tours.

In late 1985, Holmes quit rugby union when he joined Bradford Northern.

After retirement, Holmes coached Cardiff RFC and then Caerphilly rugby union teams, resigning as Caerphilly coach owing to business commitments in 2002.

== Rugby League career ==
In late 1985, Holmes became one of the biggest names of the time to turn professional, when he joined Bradford Northern for £80,000 (based on increases in average earnings, this would be approximately £309,200 in 2018). However injuries meant that he only played 40 games for the club before his retirement two years later. He scored nine tries.

Holmes played in Bradford Northern's 12–12 draw with Castleford in the 1987 Yorkshire Cup Final at Headingley Rugby Stadium, Leeds on 17 October, but he did not play in the replay.

== Sources ==
- Terry Holmes (1988) My Life in Rugby (Macmillan); ISBN 0-333-40229-4
