= 1989–90 Rugby Football League season =

- League: Stones Bitter Championship
- Teams: First Division: 14; Second Division: 21

First Division
- Champions: Wigan (11th title)
- Premiership winners: Widnes
- Man of Steel Award: (Wales) Shaun Edwards
- Top try-scorer: (England) Martin Offiah (45)

Promotion and relegation
- Promoted from Second Division: Hull Kingston Rovers; Rochdale Hornets; Oldham
- Relegated to Second Division: Leigh; Salford; Barrow

Second Division
- Champions: Hull Kingston Rovers
- Top point-scorer: Mike Fletcher (450)
- Top try-scorer: Greg Austin (38)

Promotion and relegation
- Promoted from Joined league: Trafford Borough

The 1989–90 Rugby Football League season was the 95th ever season of professional rugby league football in Britain. Fourteen teams competed from August, 1989 until May, 1990 for the Stones Bitter Championship, Premiership Trophy and Silk Cut Challenge Cup.

== Season summary ==
Trafford Borough entered the Second Division and. Mansfield Marksmen changed their name to Nottingham City.

Runcorn Highfield became only the second peacetime team in the history of the Rugby Football League to lose every game, and the first since Liverpool City in 1906–1907.

== First Division ==
Pos	Team	Pld	W	D	L	PF	PA	PP	Pts	Qualification or relegation
1	Wigan (C)	26	20	0	6	699	349	200.3	40	Qualification for Premiership first round
2	Leeds	26	18	0	8	704	383	183.8	36	Qualification for Premiership first round
3	Widnes	26	16	2	8	659	423	155.8	34	Qualification for Premiership first round
4	Bradford Northern	26	17	0	9	614	416	147.6	34	Qualification for Premiership first round
5	St Helens	26	17	0	9	714	544	131.3	34	Qualification for Premiership first round
6	Hull	26	16	1	9	577	400	144.3	33	Qualification for Premiership first round
7	Castleford	26	16	0	10	703	448	156.9	32	Qualification for Premiership first round
8	Warrington	26	13	1	12	424	451	94.0	27	Qualification for Premiership first round
9	Wakefield Trinity	26	12	1	13	502	528	95.1	25	
10	Featherstone Rovers	26	10	0	16	479	652	73.5	20	
11	Sheffield Eagles	26	9	1	16	517	588	87.9	19	
12	Leigh (R)	26	9	1	16	442	642	68.8	19	Relegated to Second Division
13	Salford (R)	26	4	1	21	421	699	60.2	9	Relegated to Second Division
14	Barrow (R)	26	1	0	25	201	1133	17.7	2	Relegated to Second Division

Rules for classification: 1) Points; 2) Points scored percentage (points scored divided by points conceded)
(C) Champions; (R) Relegated

== Second Division ==
Pos	Team	Pld	W	D	L	PF	PA	PP	Pts	Promotion or qualification
1	Hull Kingston Rovers (C, P)	28	25	0	3	1102	190	580.0	50	Promoted to First Division; Qualification for Divisional Premiership first round
2	Oldham (P)	28	24	0	4	879	325	270.5	48	Promoted to First Division; Qualification for Divisional Premiership first round
3	Rochdale Hornets (P)	28	24	0	4	977	422	231.5	48	Promoted to First Division; Qualification for Divisional Premiership first round
4	Ryedale-York	28	20	1	7	653	338	193.2	41	Qualification for Divisional Premiership first round
5	Halifax	28	20	0	8	741	360	205.8	40	Qualification for Divisional Premiership first round
6	Swinton	28	20	0	8	673	405	166.2	40	Qualification for Divisional Premiership first round
7	Dewsbury	28	19	1	8	503	411	122.4	39	Qualification for Divisional Premiership first round
8	Fulham	28	16	2	10	496	488	101.6	34	Qualification for Divisional Premiership first round
9	Doncaster	28	15	2	11	533	399	133.6	32	
10	Trafford Borough	28	15	0	13	551	551	100.0	30	
11	Huddersfield	28	14	0	14	469	441	106.3	28	
12	Batley	28	13	0	15	466	478	97.5	26	
13	Bramley	28	11	0	17	413	623	66.3	22	
14	Hunslet	28	10	0	18	431	585	73.7	20	
15	Chorley Borough	28	10	0	18	399	618	64.6	20	
16	Whitehaven	28	10	0	18	396	710	55.8	20	
17	Carlisle	28	9	0	19	511	625	81.8	18	
18	Keighley	28	6	0	22	436	837	52.1	12	
19	Workington Town	28	6	0	22	311	708	43.9	12	
20	Nottingham City	28	4	0	24	323	1032	31.3	8	
21	Runcorn Highfield	28	0	0	28	218	935	23.3	0	

Rules for classification: 1) Points; 2) Points scored percentage (points scored divided by points conceded)
(C) Champions; (P) Promoted

== Premiership ==
=== First Division Premiership ===
13 May 1990

Widnes (3)	28-6	Bradford Northern (4)
T-Tait (2), Currier (2), Holliday; G-Davies (4)		T-Marchant; G-Mumby

Old Trafford
Attendance: 40,796
Referee: Colin Morris
Player of the Match: Alan Tait

=== Divisional Premiership ===
13 May 1990

Oldham (2)	30 – 29	Hull Kingston Rovers (1)
Tries: Lord, Ford, Henderson, Irving, Ruane, Martyn; Goals: Hyde (2), Platt		Tries: Parker (2), Clark, Lyman, Harrison; Goals: Fletcher (4); Drop goals: Parker

Old Trafford, Manchester
Referee: Robin Whitfield (Widnes)
Player of the Match: Mike Ford

== Sources ==
- Fletcher, Raymond; Howes, David, eds. (1990). Rothmans Rugby League Yearbook 1990-91. London: Queen Anne Press. ISBN 978-0-356-17851-6.
- 1989–90 Rugby Football League season at wigan.rlfans.com
- Great Britain Competitions 1989-1990 at hunterlink.net.au
