= Mansfield Marksman =

Defunct English semi-professional rugby league club

Club information
- Colours: Sky blue, dark blue and yellow
- Founded: 1984; 42 years ago
- Exited: 1993; 33 years ago

Former details
- Ground: Harvey Hadden Stadium, Nottingham, 1989-93 Lowmoor Road, Kirkby-in-Ashfield, 1988-89 North Street, Alfreton, 1986-88 Field Mill, Mansfield, 1984-86

Mansfield Marksman was a rugby league team based at various times in Mansfield, Kirkby-in-Ashfield, Alfreton and ultimately Nottingham. The club changed its name to Nottingham City in 1989, and folded in 1994 a year after exiting the Rugby Football League.

Amateur rugby league continues in Mansfield in the form of Sherwood Wolf Hunt RLFC whilst Nottingham has Nottingham Outlaws who play in the Rugby League Conference National Division.

== History ==
=== Mansfield Marksman RLFC ===
Mansfield Marksman was founded in 1984 and joined the Second Division, along with Sheffield Eagles, in 1984–85. Mansfield was chosen as it was in the heartland of the Nottinghamshire coalfields, and close to Yorkshire where rugby league was much stronger.

Their general manager was Dave Parker, a rugby league journalist. They played initially at Mansfield Town's Field Mill, and were sponsored by Mansfield Brewery and named "Marksman" in the singular after a lager the brewery produced. The club colours were predominantly sky blue and dark blue shirts with yellow trim, however towards the end of their existence the club colours became a more basic blue and amber. The team was composed of northern, mainly West Yorkshire based players, who travelled down to play for Mansfield.

Mansfield's pre-season friendlies saw them play some of the strongest teams in British rugby league, including St Helens R.F.C. and Wigan. Unfortunately Mansfield's big name players were on holiday and a weakened team, including many local players, went down to heavy defeats.

Mansfield first home game in the Second Division attracted 2,291 spectators and they defeated Wakefield Trinity 15–0. They won eight of their first nine games; the only defeat being 7–6 at Dewsbury. However, they struggled after this and attendances declined steadily. Their final home game of the season against Rochdale Hornets was watched by 321 spectators and they were beaten 9–8. The club lost £90,000 in this first year and could not afford the rent at Field Mill. The final game there was on 2 February 1986 when Marksman lost 32–2 to Leigh.

The club then moved to Alfreton Town's North Street ground. The first game at the new venue was on 23 March 1986 when Mansfield were beaten 42–18 by Workington Town in front of a crowd of 290.

The club moved once again for the 1988–89 season to Sutton Town's Lowmoor Road ground at Kirkby-in-Ashfield.

=== Nottingham City RLFC ===
A boardroom split occurred over the decision to move the club to Nottingham in June 1989. The move also led to the loss of sponsorship by Mansfield Brewery and the club was renamed Nottingham City RLFC. They played at the Harvey Hadden Stadium and their initial club colours were sky blue shirts with a dark blue and gold vee, carrying over the Mansfield Marksman colours. Later the club colours changed to myrtle green, yellow and white shirts. In later years the shirts were myrtle green with purple trim. One season the team adopted the name Nottingham City Outlaws RLFC, a name that would later be used by the city's amateur side.

The Nottingham team was led by player-coach Mark Burgess, several players were from Batley Boys RLFC and other local towns, Dave Parker took over as managing director at Huddersfield and the Nottingham City club was run by former Mansfield Director Paul Tomlinson and his mother Joan. As Nottingham they won only seven games in four years.

Chief Executive Maurice Lindsay wanted to reduce the number of clubs in the lower division of the league in 1993. The three clubs finishing bottom of the second division would be demoted to the National Conference League. Nottingham struggled and finished bottom of the Third Division at the end of the 1992–93 season, winning only one game. With both Nottingham City and Blackpool Gladiators both already relegated, the crucial last match at Nottingham on 11 April 1993, between Nottingham City and Highfield would determine the final relegation spot. Highfield won 39-6 and Highfield survived at the expense of Chorley Borough.

The RLSA, the Rugby League Supporters Association, had called on fans to turn out at the Harvey Hadden Stadium, in protest against the decision, City's normal crowd of three hundred or so was boosted by this to a season's best of 851. The three expelled clubs plus Highfield RLFC pursued legal action against the Rugby Football League decision, but to no avail.

Nottingham could no longer afford Yorkshire-based players so imported local Nottingham Crusaders players who were not of National Conference League standards and they were relegated in their first year and then resigned from the league the following year.

== See also ==
- Rugby Football League expansion
