= 1992–93 Rugby Football League season =

- League: Championship
- Duration: 26 Rounds
- Teams: First Division: 14; Second Division: 8 Third Division: 13
- Broadcast partners: Sky Sports

First Division
- Champions: Wigan (14th title)
- Premiership winners: St. Helens
- Man of Steel Award: (England) Andy Platt

Second Division
- Champions: Featherstone Rovers

Promotion and relegation
- Promoted from Second Division: Featherstone Rovers; Oldham

Third Division
- Champions: Keighley Cougars

Promotion and Relegation
- Promoted to Second Division: Keighley Cougars; Workington Town; Dewsbury; Ryedale-York; Whitehaven; Batley; Doncaster; Hunslet; Highfield; Barrow
- Relegated to National Conference League: Chorley Borough; Blackpool Gladiators; Nottingham City

The 1992–93 Rugby Football League season was the 98th ever season of professional rugby league football in Britain. Sixteen teams competed from August, 1992 until May, 1993 for the Stones Bitter Championship, Premiership Trophy and Silk Cut Challenge Cup.

== Season summary ==
- Stones Bitter League Champions: Wigan
- Silk Cut Challenge Cup Winners: Wigan (20-14 v Widnes)
- Stones Bitter Premiership Trophy Winners: St. Helens (10-4 v Wigan)
  - Harry Sunderland Trophy: Chris Joynt
- 1992–93 Regal Trophy Winners: Wigan (15-8 v Bradford Northern)
- 2nd Division Champions: Featherstone Rovers

The 1993 Man of Steel Award for player of the season went to Wigan's Andy Platt.

In March 1993, clubs voted to return to a two-division structure from the start of the 1993–94 season, which also included the scrapping of the county cup competitions. The vote also controversially meant that the bottom three Third Division clubs would be expelled from the League, with several clubs threatening legal action against the decision. The three relegated teams (Chorley Borough, Blackpool Gladiators and Nottingham City) were accepted into the National Conference League.

== League Tables ==
=== First Division ===
Pos	Team	Pld	W	D	L	PF	PA	PP	Pts	Qualification or relegation
1	Wigan (C)	26	20	1	5	744	327	227.5	41	Qualification for the Premiership first round
2	St Helens	26	20	1	5	632	345	183.2	41	Qualification for the Premiership first round
3	Bradford Northern	26	15	0	11	553	434	127.4	30	Qualification for the Premiership first round
4	Widnes	26	15	0	11	549	446	123.1	30	Qualification for the Premiership first round
5	Leeds	26	14	2	10	595	522	114.0	30	Qualification for the Premiership first round
6	Castleford	26	14	1	11	544	401	135.7	29	Qualification for the Premiership first round
7	Halifax	26	13	0	13	557	505	110.3	26	Qualification for the Premiership first round
8	Warrington	26	12	1	13	487	450	108.2	25	Qualification for the Premiership first round
9	Hull F.C.	26	10	1	15	381	535	71.2	21	
10	Sheffield Eagles	26	10	1	15	405	627	64.6	21	
11	Leigh	26	9	2	15	410	630	65.1	20	
12	Wakefield Trinity	26	8	2	16	405	535	75.7	18	
13	Salford	26	9	0	17	498	725	68.7	18	
14	Hull Kingston Rovers	26	7	0	19	321	599	53.6	14	

Rules for classification: 1) Points; 2) Points scored percentage (points scored divided by points conceded)
(C) Champions

=== Second Division ===
Pos	Team	Pld	W	D	L	PF	PA	PD	Pts	Promotion, qualification or relegation
1	Featherstone Rovers (C, P)	28	24	1	3	996	352	+644	49	Promoted to First Division; Qualified for Divisional Premiership second round
2	Oldham (P)	28	20	1	7	753	503	+250	41	Promoted to First Division; Qualified for Divisional Premiership second round
3	Huddersfield	28	15	0	13	565	548	+17	30	Qualified for Divisional Premiership second round
4	Rochdale Hornets	28	14	0	14	622	607	+15	28	Qualified for Divisional Premiership second round
5	London Crusaders	28	12	2	14	534	562	−28	26	
6	Swinton	28	10	0	18	411	636	−225	20	
7	Carlisle	28	6	3	19	454	721	−267	15	
8	Bramley	28	7	1	20	328	734	−406	15	

Rules for classification: 1) Points; 2) Points difference; 3) Number of points scored;
(C) Champions; (P) Promoted

=== Third Division ===
Pos	Team	Pld	W	D	L	PF	PA	PD	Pts	Promotion, qualification or relegation
1	Keighley Cougars (C, P)	24	21	0	3	917	288	+629	42	Promoted to Second Division; Qualified for Divisional Premiership first round
2	Workington Town (P)	24	19	0	5	835	237	+598	38	Promoted to Second Division; Qualified for Divisional Premiership first round
3	Dewsbury (P)	24	18	0	6	718	291	+427	36	Promoted to Second Division; Qualified for Divisional Premiership first round
4	Ryedale-York (P)	24	17	0	7	747	335	+412	34	Promoted to Second Division; Qualified for Divisional Premiership first round
5	Whitehaven (P)	24	16	0	8	696	328	+368	32	Promoted to Second Division; Qualified for Divisional Premiership first round
6	Batley (P)	24	16	0	8	508	268	+240	32	Promoted to Second Division; Qualified for Divisional Premiership first round
7	Doncaster (P)	24	14	0	10	564	469	+95	28	Promoted to Second Division; Qualified for Divisional Premiership first round
8	Hunslet (P)	24	14	0	10	554	498	+56	28	Promoted to Second Division; Qualified for Divisional Premiership first round
9	Highfield (P)	24	6	0	18	310	915	−605	12	Promoted to Second Division
10	Barrow (P)	24	5	0	19	476	625	−149	10	Promoted to Second Division
11	Chorley Borough (R)	24	5	0	19	317	781	−464	10	Relegation to National Conference League
12	Blackpool Gladiators (R)	24	4	0	20	302	958	−656	8	Relegation to National Conference League
13	Nottingham City (R)	24	1	0	23	181	1132	−951	2	Relegation to National Conference League

Rules for classification: 1) Points; 2) Points difference; 3) Number of points scored;
(C) Champions; (P) Promoted; (R) Relegated

== Challenge Cup ==
The 1993 Silk Cut Challenge Cup Final was played by Wigan and Widnes on 2:30 on a warm and sunny Saturday afternoon, 1 May 1993 at Wembley Stadium, London in front of 77,684. By coming on as a substitute in this game at 17 years and 11 months of age, Andy Farrell become the youngest player to win a Challenge Cup final. The winner of the Lance Todd Trophy was Wigan's Dean Bell.

== County cups ==
Wigan beat St. Helens 5–4 to win the 1992 Lancashire Cup, and Wakefield Trinity beat Sheffield Eagles 29–16 to win the Yorkshire Cup. To date this was final season of the Lancashire Cup and Yorkshire Cup competitions that, except for the break for World War I and World War II (Lancashire Cup only), had taken place annually since their inaugural 1905–06 season.

== Rugby League World Cup final ==
On 24 October, the Final of the 1989-92 Rugby League World Cup took place at Wembley Stadium between Great Britain and Australia. In front of a record international attendance of 73,631, The Kangaroos triumphed 10–6.

Prior to the Final, the Australian team embarked on a mini 3 game tour as a warm up and selection trial.

game	Date	Result	Venue	Attendance
1	9 October	Australia def. Huddersfield 66–2	Leeds Road, Huddersfield	4,716
2	14 October	Australia def. Sheffield 52–22	Don Valley Stadium, Sheffield	5,500
3	18 October	Australia def. Cumbria 44–0	Derwent Park, Workington	5,156

24 October 1992
2:30PM (GMT)

Great Britain	6 – 10	Australia
Tries: Goals: Deryck Fox (3/4)	Report	Tries: Steve Renouf; Goals: Mal Meninga (3/4)

Wembley Stadium, London
Attendance: 73,631
Referee: Dennis Hale (New Zealand)
Player of the Match: Steve Walters

== Sources ==
- 1992–93 Rugby Football League season at rlhalloffame.org.uk
- 1992–93 Rugby Football League season at wigan.rlfans.com
- Wigan's record Cup run at news.bbc.co.uk
- Great Britain Competitions 1992-1993 at hunterlink.net.au
- Championship 1992/93 at rugbyleagueproject.org
