= 1987–88 Rugby Football League season =

- League: Stones Bitter Championship
- Teams: First Division: 14; Second Division: 20

First Division
- Champions: Widnes (2nd title)
- Premiership: Widnes
- Man of Steel Award: (England) Martin Offiah
- Top point-scorer: (England) John Woods (351)
- Top try-scorer: (England) Martin Offiah (44)

Promotion and relegation
- Promoted from Second Division: Oldham; Featherstone Rovers; Wakefield Trinity
- Relegated to Second Division: Leigh; Swinton; Hunslet

Second Division
- Champions: Oldham
- Runners-up: Featherstone Rovers
- Top point-scorer: Kevin Pape (23)

The 1987–88 Rugby Football League season was the 93rd season of rugby league football in Britain.

== Season summary ==
During the summer of 1987, freedom of contract was introduced, replacing the retain and transfer system used in previous seasons. Players could now negotiate a move to another club at the end of their contract, with the new club paying compensation to the player's former club. An independent tribunal was created to rule on transfers where the two clubs were unable to agree on a fee. The first case decided by the new tribunal was on 27 August 1987, setting a £40,000 fee for Ged Byrne's transfer from Salford to Wigan.

During the season, defending champions Wigan hosted NSWRL champions, the Manly-Warringah Sea Eagles in the 1987 World Club Challenge match. Wigan were World Club Champions for the first time when they beat Manly-Warringah 8–2 at Central Park, Wigan on 7 Oct 1987 before a crowd of 36,895

The Stones Bitter League Champions were Widnes for the second time in their history, exactly ten years after their first. Leigh, Swinton and Hunslet were relegated.

The Challenge Cup winners were Wigan who beat Halifax 32–12 in the final.

John Player Special Trophy winners were St. Helens who beat Leeds 15–14 in the final.

Rugby League Premiership Trophy Winners were Widnes who beat St. Helens 38–14 in the final.

2nd Division Champions were Oldham. Featherstone Rovers and Wakefield Trinity were also promoted. Blackpool Borough changed their name to Springfield Borough.

Wigan beat Warrington 28–16 to win the Lancashire County Cup, and Bradford Northern beat Castleford 12–12 (replay 11–2) to win the Yorkshire County Cup.

At the end of the season players from the League were selected to go on the 1988 Great Britain Lions tour.

== First Division ==
Pos	Team	Pld	W	D	L	PF	PA	PP	Pts	Qualification or relegation
1	Widnes (C)	26	20	0	6	641	311	206.1	40	Qualification for Premiership first round
2	St Helens	26	18	0	8	672	337	199.4	36	Qualification for Premiership first round
3	Wigan	26	17	2	7	621	327	189.9	36	Qualification for Premiership first round
4	Bradford Northern	26	18	0	8	528	304	173.7	36	Qualification for Premiership first round
5	Leeds	26	15	3	8	577	450	128.2	33	Qualification for Premiership first round
6	Warrington	26	14	2	10	531	416	127.6	30	Qualification for Premiership first round
7	Castleford	26	13	0	13	505	559	90.3	26	Qualification for Premiership first round
8	Halifax	26	12	0	14	499	437	114.2	24	Qualification for Premiership first round
9	Hull Kingston Rovers	26	11	1	14	420	480	87.5	23	
10	Hull	26	11	0	15	364	595	61.2	22	
11	Salford	26	10	0	16	368	561	65.6	20	
12	Leigh (R)	26	9	0	17	416	559	74.4	18	Relegated to Second Division
13	Swinton (R)	26	4	2	20	390	780	50.0	10	Relegated to Second Division
14	Hunslet (R)	26	4	2	20	363	779	46.6	10	Relegated to Second Division

Rules for classification: 1) Points; 2) Points scored percentage (points scored divided by points conceded)
(C) Champions; (R) Relegated

== Second Division ==
Pos	Team	Pld	W	D	L	PF	PA	PP	Pts	Promotion or qualification
1	Oldham (C, P)	28	23	1	4	771	335	230.1	47	Promoted to First Division Qualification for Divisional Premiership first round
2	Featherstone Rovers (P)	28	21	2	5	712	353	201.7	44	Promoted to First Division Qualification for Divisional Premiership first round
3	Wakefield Trinity (P)	28	20	1	7	666	315	211.4	41	Promoted to First Division Qualification for Divisional Premiership first round
4	Springfield Borough	28	18	0	10	448	356	125.8	36	Qualification for Divisional Premiership first round
5	Sheffield Eagles	28	16	1	11	490	429	114.2	33	Qualification for Divisional Premiership first round
6	Mansfield Marksman	28	15	1	12	439	412	106.6	31	Qualification for Divisional Premiership first round
7	York	28	15	1	12	558	526	106.1	31	Qualification for Divisional Premiership first round
8	Keighley	28	15	0	13	495	428	115.7	30	Qualification for Divisional Premiership first round
9	Barrow	28	14	2	12	382	397	96.2	30	
10	Workington Town	28	15	0	13	380	441	86.2	30	
11	Carlisle	28	14	1	13	388	444	87.4	29	
12	Runcorn Highfield	28	14	0	14	420	469	89.6	28	
13	Whitehaven	28	10	1	17	417	452	92.3	21	
14	Bramley	28	10	1	17	400	600	66.7	21	
15	Dewsbury	28	10	0	18	417	519	80.3	20	
16	Doncaster	28	9	2	17	406	512	79.3	20	
17	Fulham	28	10	0	18	382	559	68.3	20	
18	Rochdale Hornets	28	10	0	18	322	514	62.6	20	
19	Huddersfield Barracudas	28	7	1	20	383	597	64.2	15	
20	Batley	28	6	1	21	305	523	58.3	13	

Rules for classification: 1) Points; 2) Points scored percentage (points scored divided by points conceded)
(C) Champions; (P) Promoted

== Premiership ==
=== First Division Premiership ===
15 May 1988

Widnes (1)	38-14	St Helens (2)
T-Tait, D Wright, D Hulme (2), Sorensen, McKenzie; G-Platt, Currier(4)		T-Ledger, Haggerty; G-Loughlin (3)

Old Trafford
Attendance: 35,252
Referee: John Holdsworth
Player of the Match: David Hulme

=== Divisional Premiership ===
15 May 1988

Oldham (1)	28 – 26	Featherstone Rovers (2)
Tries: Foy (2), Flanagan, Walsh, Meadows; Goals: McAlister (4)		Tries: Steadman (2), Bannister, Sykes; Goals: Quinn (5)

Old Trafford, Manchester
Referee: Robin Whitfield (Widnes)
Player of the Match: Des Foy

== Sources ==
- 1987-88 Rugby Football League season at wigan.rlfans.com
- The Challenge Cup at The Rugby Football League website
- Fletcher, Raymond; Howes, David, eds. (1988). Rothmans Rugby League Yearbook 1988-89. London: Queen Anne Press. ISBN 978-0-356-15882-2.
