= 1988 Great Britain Lions tour =

National rugby team tour

- Date: 22 May 1988 – 19 July 1988
- Manager: Les Bettinson
- Coach(es): Mal Reilly
- Tour captain(s): Ellery Hanley
- Top point scorer(s): Paul Loughlin (90)
- Top try scorer(s): Martin Offiah (19)
Summary
P	W	D	L
Total
18	11	0	7
Test match
5	2	0	3
Opponent
P	W	D	L
Papua New Guinea
1	1	0	0
Australia
3	1	0	2
New Zealand
1	0	0	1

Tour chronology
- Previous tour: 1984
- Next tour: 1990

The 1988 Great Britain Lions tour was the Great Britain national rugby league team's 18th tour of Australasia and took place from May to July 1988. It started with a Test match against Papua New Guinea before the best-of-three series against Australia for the Ashes title, and finally a Test against New Zealand. Some of these matches counted toward the ongoing 1985–1988 World Cup tournament. An additional 13 matches were played against local club and representative sides from each host nation.

== Background ==
The tour took place after Britain's 1987–88 Rugby Football League season. A 16-man British press party - the largest ever - accompanied the team through Papua New Guinea, Australia and New Zealand.

== Touring squad ==
Mal Reilly was the British team's coach. The assistant coach was British Amateur Rugby League Association (BARLA) and RFL Coaching Director Phil Larder. The tour manager was Les Bettinson. The touring side's captain was Ellery Hanley, who was signed by Sydney club the Balmain Tigers to play the remaining rounds of the 1988 NSWRFL season once his representative commitments were fulfilled. It was also announced during the tour that Kevin Ward, who had played in Manly-Warringah's 1987 premiership winning team, would rejoin the Sea Eagles for the remainder of their season once the tour was completed.

An initial 23-man squad for the tour was selected in April 1988, with an additional three players to be selected from a "train-on" squad. Andy Goodway withdrew from the tour due to "business commitments", and was replaced by Roy Haggerty. Des Drummond was removed from the squad after allegedly punching a spectator who rushed onto the pitch shouting racial abuse during the British season. Carl Gibson was selected as his replacement. Steve Hampson withdrew due to injury, and Joe Lydon was dropped for allegedly assaulting a spectator.

Name	Position	Club	Apps	Tests	Tries	Goals	Drop goals	Points	Notes
Kevin Beardmore	Forward	Castleford	9	4	0	0	0	0	
Brian Case	Forward	Wigan	8	2	0	0	0	0	
Lee Crooks	Forward	Leeds	5	0	0	5	0	10	(Note: Lee Crooks, Paul Dixon and Andy Platt all returned home from the tour early due to injuries. They were replaced by Richard Eyres and John Joyner.)
Andy Currier	Forward	Widnes	5	0	3	5	0	22	(Note: Garry Schofield was ruled out of the rest of the tour after being injured against the Combined Brisbane team. Andy Currier was called up as a replacement.)
Paul Dixon	Forward	Halifax	8	3	1	0	0	4	
Shaun Edwards	Half	Wigan	1	1	0	0	0	0	(Note: Shaun Edwards suffered a knee injury in the Test against Papua New Guinea, and was replaced by Darren Wright.)
Richard Eyres	Forward	Widnes	3	0	1	0	0	4	
Karl Fairbank	Forward	Bradford Northern	10	0	6	0	0	24	
Mike Ford	Half	Oldham	7	0	5	0	0	20	
Phil Ford	Back	Bradford Northern	13	5	9	1	0	38	
Carl Gibson	Back	Leeds	10	0	2	0	0	8	
Henderson Gill	Wing	Wigan	12	4	7	0	0	28	
Andy Gregory	Half	Wigan	8	5	0	0	0	0	
Mike Gregory	Forward	Warrington	10	5	5	0	0	20	
Paul Groves	Forward	St Helens	8	0	1	0	0	4	
Roy Haggerty	Forward	St Helens	7	0	0	0	0	0	
Ellery Hanley (c)	Utility	Wigan	11	5	8	0	0	32	
David Hulme	Half	Widnes	13	5	1	0	0	4	
Paul Hulme	Forward	Widnes	7	3	0	0	0	0	(Note: Paul Medley took no further part in the tour after being injured against Manly-Warringah. He was replaced by Paul Hulme.)
John Joyner	Utility	Castleford	3	0	0	0	0	0	
Paul Loughlin	Back	St Helens	13	5	1	43	0	90	
Paul Medley	Forward	Leeds	5	1	3	0	0	12	
Martin Offiah	Wing	Widnes	13	4	19	0	0	76	
Andy Platt	Forward	St Helens	5	2	0	0	0	0	
Roy Powell	Forward	Leeds	14	4	1	0	0	4	
Garry Schofield	Back	Leeds	5	2	5	1	0	22	
David Stephenson	Back	Leeds	11	4	1	13	0	30	
Hugh Waddell	Forward	Oldham	13	2	0	0	0	0	
Kevin Ward	Forward	Castleford	10	5	1	0	0	4	
Ian Wilkinson	Back	Leeds	6	0	0	0	0	0	
Darren Wright	Back	Widnes	8	2	0	0	0	0	

== Papua New Guinea ==
The Lions played only two games in Papua New Guinea, winning both of them.

Sunday, 22 May

Papua New Guinea	22 – 42	Great Britain
3 Tries: Dairi Kovae (2); Arnold Krewanty; Isaac Rop 3 Goals: Bal Numapo (3)		7 Tries: Henderson Gill (2); Garry Schofield (2); Mike Gregory; Paul Medley; David Stephenson; Goals: Paul Loughlin (7)

Lloyd Robson Oval, Port Moresby
Attendance: 12,107
Referee: Greg McCallum (Australia)

Papua New Guinea	Great Britain

FB	1	Dairi Kovae
RW	2	Kepi Saea
CE	3	Mea Morea
CE	4	Bal Numapo (c)
LW	5	Arnold Krewanty
FE	6	Darius Haili
HB	7	Tony Kila
PR	8	Isaac Rop
HK	9	Michael Matmillo
PR	10	Yer Bom
SR	11	Mathias Kombra
SR	12	Tuiyo Evei
LK	13	Haoda Kouoru
Substitutions:
IC	14	Thomas Rombuk
IC	15	Ngala Lapan
Coach:
(New Zealand) Barry Wilson

FB	1	Paul Loughlin
RW	2	Phil Ford
CE	3	Garry Schofield
CE	4	David Stephenson
LW	5	Henderson Gill
SO	6	Shaun Edwards
SH	7	Andy Gregory
PR	8	Kevin Ward
HK	9	Kevin Beardmore
PR	10	Brian Case
SR	11	Paul Medley
SR	12	Mike Gregory
LF	13	Ellery Hanley (c)
Substitutions:
IC	14	David Hulme
IC	15	Paul Dixon
Coach:
(England) Mal Reilly

The result of this match counted towards the 1985–1988 World Cup tournament, the final of which was to be played later in the year. The first Test of the tour was played in 38 degree heat with fans clustered in trees and clinging to lights around the ground. 21-year-old Shaun Edwards, the youngest member of the touring party, damaged his knee after six minutes of the match and it was feared that he would miss the rest of the tour. By half time Great Britain were leading 28–6. Garry Schofield scored his 17th try in 18 Test matches for Great Britain, and captain Ellery Hanley made three try-saving tackles.

After the match Edwards was flown to Sydney to undergo surgery on his knee's cartilage due to the injury he sustained while playing in this match.

Tuesday, 24 May

Highland Division	18 – 36	Great Britain
3 Tries: Kool (2); Pokana 3 Goals: Kamiak		7 Tries: Martin Offiah (3); Phil Ford (2); Garry Schofield; 6 Goals: Lee Crooks (5); Garry Schofield

Lae Oval
Attendance: 3,270
Referee: Graham Aunui
Player of the Match: Hugh Waddell

== Australia ==
The Australian leg of the tour took place in the midst of the 1988 NSWRFL season as well as the 1988 State of Origin series. In 1988 Australia was also celebrating its national bicentenary. The tour's itinerary, which involved short periods between matches, making it tough for the visitors, was designed by the Australian Rugby League but agreed to by the British.

The Ashes series attracted just 67,554 to the three tests, with the dead rubber third game attracting just 15,944 to the Sydney Football Stadium. The second Ashes test against Australia at Lang Park in Brisbane drew the tour's highest attendance of 27,130 while the game against reigning Sydney premiers Manly-Warringah attracted the highest non-test attendance of the tour with 21,131. The total Ashes series attendance was 7,926 less than had attended the 1984 series played in Australia and was 34,006 less than the record breaking series played in England during the 1986 Kangaroo Tour. It was also easily the lowest ever attended Ashes series played in Australia since 1910 which attracted 60,000 fans.

=== Test Venues ===
The three Ashes series tests took place at the following venues. Two games were played in Sydney at the new Sydney Football Stadium which had replaced the Sydney Cricket Ground as the main rugby league venue in Sydney.

Sydney	Brisbane
Sydney Football Stadium	Lang Park
Capacity: 40,000	Capacity: 32,500

Friday, 27 May

North Queensland	16 – 66	Great Britain
Tries: Filosi (2), House; Goals: Worth (1); Conlan (1)		Tries: Martin Offiah (4), Mike Ford (3), Phil Ford (2), Paul Medley (2), Paul Dixon; Goals: David Stephenson (8); Phil Ford (1)

Cairns Showgrounds, Cairns
Attendance: 5,500
Referee: Barry Gomersall

North Queensland: Namok, Gagai, Taylor, Turia, Curry, Worth, Filosi, Colwell, Bax, McAskill, House, Dalley, Greenwood. Res - Ernest, Conlan

Great Britain: Phil Ford, Paul Medley, Carl Gibson, David Stephenson, Martin Offiah, David Hulme, Mike Ford, Brian Case, Paul Groves, Roy Powell, Karl Fairbank, Paul Dixon, Andy Platt (c). Res - Roy Haggerty

Wednesday, 1 June
15:00

Newcastle Knights	12 – 28	Great Britain
Tries: Brett Shore, Tony Kemp, Glenn Miller; Goals:		Tries: Martin Offiah (2), Ellery Hanley (2), Kevin Ward; Goals: Paul Loughlin (4)

Newcastle International Sports Centre, Newcastle
Attendance: 8,970
Referee: Greg McCallum

Newcastle Knights	Great Britain

FB	1	Glenn Frendo
LW	2	Troy Clarke
CE	3	Jeff Doyle
CE	4	Tony Kemp
RW	5	Glenn Miller
FE	6	Robbie McCormack
HB	7	Steve Fulmer
LK	8	Mark Glanville
SR	9	Sam Stewart (c)
SR	10	Michael McKiernan
PR	11	David Thorne
HK	12	Tony Townsend
PR	13	Brett Shore
Substitutions:
IC	14	Steve Walters
IC	15	Scott Carter
Coach:
(Australia) Allan McMahon

FB	1	Paul Loughlin
RW	2	Henderson Gill
CE	3	Carl Gibson
CE	4	Darren Wright
LW	5	Martin Offiah
SO	6	Ellery Hanley (c)
SH	7	Andy Gregory
PR	8	Kevin Ward
HK	9	Kevin Beardmore
PR	10	Hugh Waddell
SR	11	Mike Gregory
SR	12	Paul Dixon
LF	13	Andy Platt
Substitutions:
IC	14
IC	15
Coach:
(England) Mal Reilly

The Newcastle Knights, a new team in the NSWRL Premiership in 1988, was rewarded for large early season attendances with a game against the touring Lions.

Sunday, 5 June

Northern Division	36 – 12	Great Britain
Tries: Ewan McGrady (2), Chris Cumming, B. Plater, M. Manes; Goals: M. Spinks (8)		Tries: Henderson Gill, Garry Schofield; Goals: Paul Loughlin (2)

Scully Park, Tamworth
Attendance: 4,000
Referee: Barry Priest
Player of the Match: Ewan McGrady

Northern Division	Great Britain

FB	1	Spinks
LW	2	Plater
CE	3	Gardner
CE	4	Matthew Ryan
RW	5	French
FE	6	Rocky Laurie (c)
HB	7	Ewan McGrady
LK	8	Maynes
SR	9	Lavender
SR	10	Cumming
PR	11	Cotter
HK	12	Masters
PR	13	McCann
Substitutions:
IC	14	McCormack
IC	15	Briggs
Coach:

FB	1	Paul Loughlin
RW	2	Phil Ford
CE	3	Garry Schofield (c)
CE	4	David Stephenson
LW	5	Henderson Gill
SO	6	David Hulme
SH	7	Mike Ford
PR	8	Brian Case
HK	9	Paul Groves
PR	10	Lee Crooks
SR	11	Roy Powell
SR	12	Paul Medley
LF	13	Roy Haggerty
Substitutions:
IC	14
IC	15	Karl Fairbank
Coach:
(England) Mal Reilly

The Northern Division side, captained by former NSW, South Sydney and Eastern Suburbs five-eighth Rocky Laurie, gave the tourists their first defeat, and a heavy defeat at that. Also playing for Northern Division was future NSWRL Rothmans Medal winner with Canterbury-Bankstown, Moree Boomerangs Halfback Ewan McGrady who crossed for two tries and future Canterbury premiership winning centre Matthew Ryan. The game became known as "Black Sunday" for the Lions who went down 36-12. According to media reports, after the game Mal Reilly locked his team in the dressing room and upbraided them for 20 minutes before the media were allowed in.

Tuesday, 7 June

Manly-Warringah	30 – 0	Great Britain
Tries: Ian Gately, Mark Pocock, Geoff Toovey, Charlie Haggett, Cliff Lyons; Goals: Tim Dwyer (5/5)		Tries: Goals:

Brookvale Oval, Sydney
Attendance: 21,131
Referee: Francis Desplas (France)
Player of the Match: Geoff Toovey

Manly-Warringah	Great Britain

FB	1	Tim Dwyer
LW	2	Stuart Davis
CE	3	Joe Ropati
CE	4	Darrell Williams
RW	5	Greg Austin
FE	6	Cliff Lyons
HB	7	Geoff Toovey
LK	8	Des Hasler
SR	9	Noel Cleal (c)
SR	10	Mark Pocock
PR	11	Mark Brokenshire
HK	12	Charlie Haggett
PR	13	Ian Gately
Substitutions:
IC	14	Paul Shaw
IC	15	Glenn Ryan
Coach:
(Australia) Bob Fulton

FB	1	Phil Ford
RW	2	Carl Gibson
CE	3	Ian Wilkinson
CE	4	Darren Wright
LW	5	Martin Offiah
SO	6	David Stephenson
SH	7	David Hulme
PR	8	Hugh Waddell
HK	9	Paul Groves
PR	10	Roy Powell
SR	11	Karl Fairbank
SR	12	Paul Medley
LF	13	Andy Platt (c)
Substitutions:
IC	14	Roy Haggerty
IC	15	Lee Crooks
Coach:
(England) Mal Reilly

Although facing the Lions mid-week side which still included test players Andy Platt, Martin Offiah, Phil Ford, Carl Gibson, David Hulme and Roy Powell, Manly went into the game missing regular first grade players in lock forward Paul Vautin, centre Michael O'Connor and prop forward Phil Daley (Australian test players rested before the first test four days later), while fullback Dale Shearer, winger David Ronson and hooker Mal Cochrane were all unavailable due to injury. In the absence of usual team captain Vautin, the defending Winfield Cup premiers were captained by 1986 Kangaroo Tourist and 10 test veteran Noel Cleal who had a point to prove after being a shock omission from the Australian and NSW sides (the Lions camp and the English media following the team was reportedly dumbfounded at Cleal's non-selection). In front of a vocal Brookvale Oval crowd of 21,131, the largest non-test attendance of the tour and the 3rd highest tour attendance outside only the first and second Ashes tests, the makeshift Sea Eagles side put the tourists to the sword, running out five tries to nil winners. Manly's teenage halfback Geoff Toovey, playing only his third game of top grade football, capped a man-of-the-match performance scoring one of his sides tries. The match saw the first time that former test rivals and teammates in Manly's 1972 and 1973 premiership wins Bob Fulton (Manly) and Mal Reilly (Great Britain) would coach against each other.

For the Lions, their captain on the night Andy Platt was far and away their best player with the rest showing little form heading into the first test just 4 days later. After Cliff Lyons crossed for Manly's 5th try in just 60th minute, the game descended into a scrappy contest as fatigue and high frustrations for the Lions resulted in Mark Brokenshire (Manly) and Roy Haggerty (GB) each getting 10 minutes in the sin-bin for foul play. For Manly, Toovey, Lyons, Cleal and Des Hasler (playing at lock) led the way for the 30–0 win while fullback Tim Dwyer capped a fine night kicking 5 goals from 5 attempts.

The game was refereed by Frenchman Francis Desplas who would be the referee for all three tests of the Ashes series. Although not playing the game, Mal Reilly allowed Lions prop forward Kevin Ward who had played in Manly's 1987 Grand Final winning team (and would again link with Manly once the tour ended), to take the toss of the coin in front of his 'home' fans despite Andy Platt captaining the side. The scheduling of the game against the reigning Sydney premiers only four days out from the first test drew criticism from Lions management and the British press who were covering the tour.

=== 1st Ashes Test ===
The Ashes series was styled the 'Winfield Test series' due to sponsorship from Winfield cigarettes. The first game was the 100th rugby league test between the two sides. Andrew Ettingshausen, Peter Jackson, Tony Currie, Sam Backo, Phil Daley and Gary Belcher were selected to make their Test match debuts for Australia. Largely thanks to their 3-0 domination of the State of Origin series, Queensland players dominated in the Australian forward pack with Manly's Phil Daley the only NSW player in the starting six. Both Blues skipper Wayne Pearce and Noel Cleal were shock omissions while Wally Fullerton-Smith (second row) and Greg Conescu (hooker) were recalled for their first tests since 1984 and 1985 respectively. The absence through injury of several of Great Britain's Test stars meant that several members of their team were playing out of position.

Following heavy losses to Northern Division and Manly-Warringah in their two games immediately prior to the first test, one unnamed ARL official allegedly remarked that trying to promote a test series with the Great Britain side (who had not won a test against Australia since the second test of the 1978 Kangaroo Tour) was like trying to flog a dead horse. Indeed, this was reflected when only 24,480 attended the first test at the Sydney Football Stadium, with the dead rubber third test at the venue only attracting 15,944 fans, the lowest ever test attendance between the two teams in Sydney.

Saturday, 11 June

Australia	17 – 6	Great Britain
Tries: Peter Jackson (2); Sam Backo; Goals: Michael O'Connor (2/5); Field goal: Wally Lewis		Try: Ellery Hanley Goals: Paul Loughlin (1/5)

Sydney Football Stadium, Sydney
Attendance: 24,480
Referee: Francois Desplas (France)
Player of the Match: Kevin Ward

Australia	Great Britain

FB	1	Garry Jack
RW	2	Andrew Ettingshausen
CE	3	Michael O'Connor
CE	4	Peter Jackson
LW	5	Tony Currie
FE	6	Wally Lewis (c)
HB	7	Peter Sterling
PR	8	Phil Daley
HK	9	Greg Conescu
PR	10	Sam Backo
SR	11	Wally Fullerton-Smith
SR	12	Paul Vautin
Lk	13	Bob Lindner
Substitutions:
IC	14	Gary Belcher
IC	15	Steve Folkes
Coach:
(Australia) Don Furner

FB	1	Paul Loughlin
RW	2	Phil Ford
CE	3	Garry Schofield
CE	4	David Stephenson
LW	5	Martin Offiah
SO	6	David Hulme
SH	7	Andy Gregory
PR	8	Andy Platt
HK	9	Kevin Beardmore
PR	10	Kevin Ward
SR	11	Paul Dixon
SR	12	Mike Gregory
LF	13	Ellery Hanley (c)
Substitutions:
IC	14	Henderson Gill
IC	15	Roy Powell
Coach:
(England) Mal Reilly

Following a high tackle on British hooker Kevin Beardmore by Australian front rower Phil Daley, Great Britain put the first points on the board with Paul Loughlin's penalty kick from 40 metres out. The first try also went to the visitors with Ellery Hanley beating several defenders to score in the corner. Great Britain looked the better team in the first half and were leading 6–0 at the break.

After six minutes of the second-half Sam Backo ran on to a Peter Sterling pass to score Australia's first try, although there was doubt around the ball's grounding. Peter Jackson scored two tries over 11 minutes to give Australia victory. In between these two tries Wally Lewis kicked a field goal.

John MacDonald of The Sydney Morning Herald reported that the tourists were not only competitive, but a little unlucky, and that the 17–6 score did not reflect how close they came to winning. He also leveled heavy criticism at the refereeing performance of Francois Desplas, who could not speak English. As man-of-the-match, British forward Kevin Ward received $1,000.

Great Britain's second-row forward Andy Platt received an injury to his left arm that was expected to see him sidelined for the next two weeks.

Wednesday, 15 June

Combined Brisbane	14 – 28	Great Britain
Tries: Brett McCarthy, Kelly Egan, Gordon Barwick; Goals: Peter Coyne (1)		Tries: Martin Offiah (2), Garry Schofield, Karl Fairbank, Mike Ford; Goals: David Stephenson (4)

Lang Park, Brisbane
Attendance: 1,810

Combined Brisbane: Steve Hegarty, Kelly Egan, Brett McCarthy, Cherry, Gordon Barwick, Peter Coyne, Daunt, McIntyre, Holmes, Ponting, Glen Haggath, Ian Stains, Darren Smith. Res - Kevin Langer, White

Great Britain: Phil Ford, Henderson Gill, Garry Schofield, Carl Gibson, Ellery Hanley (c), Mike Ford, Brian Case, Paul Groves, Lee Crooks, Roy Powell, Karl Fairbank, Paul Dixon. Res - Martin Offiah, Hugh Waddell

In the 20th minute of the match British centre Garry Schofield was assisted from the field with a fractured jaw bone.

Friday, 17 June

Central Queensland	8 – 64	Great Britain
Tries: Marshall Leisha; Goals: D Weinert (2)		Tries: Karl Fairbank (3), Martin Offiah (3), Ellery Hanley (2), Carl Gibson (2), Roy Powell; Goals: Paul Loughlin (10)

Browne Park, Rockhampton
Attendance: 4,418
Referee: L. Crane

Central Queensland: Crow, Miller, Peter White, Paul White, Hinricks, Iles, Upkett, Olsson, Emmert, Weinert, Leisha, Duff, Brazier.

Great Britain: Paul Loughlin, Carl Gibson, Ian Wilkinson, Darren Wright, Martin Offiah, Ellery Hanley (c), David Hulme, Kevin Ward, Kevin Beardmore, Hugh Waddell, Roy Powell, Karl Fairbank, Roy Haggerty. Res - Lee Crooks, Henderson Gill

British prop Lee Crooks injured his shoulder in this match putting him in doubt for the remainder of the Ashes series. Winning the scrums 11-2, Great Britain had a wealth of possession and exploited it ruthlessly. The Capras' only try came from Black Water Devils second-rower Marshall Leisha during the last ten minutes.

Wednesday, 22 June

Toowoomba / S-E Queensland	12 – 28	Great Britain
Tries: Claney, Johnson; Goals: Dwyer (2)		Tries: Ellery Hanley (2), Mike Gregory (2), Phil Ford; Goals: Paul Loughlin (4)

Athletic Oval, Toowoomba
Attendance: 3,874
Referee: Tim Bliss

Toowoomba / S-E Queensland: Weribone, Clevin, Blake, Pratt, Stower, Clancy, Smith, Dwyer, M. Cook, Sutoon, Buckle, Johnson, Sullivan. Res - Terry Cook, Neale

Great Britain: Paul Loughlin, Henderson Gill, David Stephenson, Phil Ford, Martin Offiah, Ellery Hanley (c), David Hulme, Kevin Ward, Kevin Beardmore, Paul Dixon, Karl Fairbank, Roy Powell, Mike Gregory.

Saturday, 25 June

Wide Bay	0 – 14	Great Britain
Tries: Goals:		Tries: Andy Currier, Martin Offiah, Mike Ford; Goals: Paul Loughlin (1)

Albert Park, Gympie
Attendance: 2,310
Referee: Russell Leis

Wide Bay: Ovens, Templeman, Kirby, Lalli, Kinsela, Jones, Ward, Reddacliff, Gerrard, McGrath, Sempf, Schulte, March. Res - Graving, Ryan

Great Britain: Ian Wilkinson, Carl Gibson, Andy Currier, Darren Wright, Henderson Gill, Mike Ford, Paul Hulme, Brian Case, Paul Groves, Hugh Waddell, Roy Powell, Karl Fairbank, Roy Haggerty. Res - Paul Loughlin, Martin Offiah

=== 2nd Ashes Test ===
The Australians made two changes to the side that won the first test in Sydney. Wayne Pearce earned a recall at lock with Bob Lindner moving to the bench in place of Steve Folkes. Injuries again forced Mal Reilly into changing his side for the second test. Garry Schofield's broken jaw saw Phil Ford moved to the centres with Henderson Gill recalled onto the wing. Captain Ellery Hanley moved from lock to the centres in place of David Stephenson with Mike Gregory coming in at lock forward. Andy Platt dropped from the front row to the back row with Roy Powell coming into prop. Darren Wright and Paul Hulme were the new players on the bench.

Match commentary was provided by Darrell Eastlake and supercoach Jack Gibson.

Tuesday, 28 June

Australia	34 – 14	Great Britain
Tries: Sam Backo; Andrew Ettingshausen; Peter Jackson; Wally Lewis; Michael O'Connor; Wayne Pearce; Goals: Michael O'Connor (5)		Tries: Phil Ford; Martin Offiah Goals: Paul Loughlin (3)

Lang Park, Brisbane
Attendance: 27,130
Referee: Francois Desplas (France)
Player of the Match: Wally Lewis

Australia	Great Britain

FB	1	Garry Jack
LW	2	Tony Currie
CE	3	Michael O'Connor
CE	4	Peter Jackson
RW	5	Andrew Ettingshausen
FE	6	Wally Lewis (c)
HB	7	Peter Sterling
PR	8	Phil Daley
HK	9	Greg Conescu
PR	10	Sam Backo
SR	11	Wally Fullerton-Smith
SR	12	Paul Vautin
LK	13	Wayne Pearce
Substitutions:
IC	14	Gary Belcher
IC	15	Bob Lindner
Coach:
(Australia) Don Furner

FB	1	Paul Loughlin
RW	2	Henderson Gill
CE	3	Phil Ford
CE	4	Ellery Hanley (c)
LW	5	Martin Offiah
SO	6	David Hulme
SH	7	Andy Gregory
PR	8	Kevin Ward
HK	9	Kevin Beardmore
PR	10	Roy Powell
SR	11	Paul Dixon
SR	12	Andy Platt
LF	13	Mike Gregory
Substitutions:
IC	14	Darren Wright
IC	15	Paul Hulme
Coach:
(England) Mal Reilly

On Lang Park's electronic scoreboard the message "Bullfrog - shame our favourite No 7 isn't here" was displayed in a reference to Queensland halfback Allan Langer being overlooked for selection by Kangaroos team manager Peter Moore in favour of Peter Sterling.

The tourists got first points with a penalty kick. After playing the ball three quarters of the way towards Great Britain's line Australians moved the ball through the hands out to left centre Michael O'Connor who broke through the defence and scored the first try. Australia's next try came in the twentieth minute when Wally Lewis chip kicked the ball ahead for himself, re-gathered it and passed it Peter Jackson who crossed untouched and scored behind the uprights. O'Connor successfully converted his try taking the score to 14–4 in favour of the hosts. After playing the ball around mid field the Australians kept the ball alive with a total of nine passes, the last of which was to Andrew Ettingshausen on the right wing who beat Martin Offiah to dive over in the corner. O'Connor's conversion attempt hit the upright so the half time score remained at 18–4.

After the break Great Britain were playing the ball within their own half of the field when Ellery Hanley got it at first receiver and ran himself, splitting the defence and racing into Australia's half where he passed to Ford who ran the remaining forty metres to score beneath the uprights. Sam Backo then scored a close range try, running from dummy-half and forcing his way over the line. Again playing the ball close to Great Britain's line Australia scored from dummy half once more when Wayne Pearce dived over. Playing the ball just inside Great Britain's half the Australians continued up-field, evading tacklers and passing to support players, the last of whom was Wally Lewis who ran the remaining metres to score untouched. Five minutes from full-time Andy Gregory was sent to the sin-bin for 10 minutes—effectively for the remainder of the game—after another high tackle on Ettingshausen.

By winning this match Australia successfully defended their Ashes title. The Poms' excessive aggression was seen as costing them the match. Criticism of French referee Desplas also continued.

Sunday, 3 July

Western Division	26 – 28	Great Britain
Tries: Moy, Michael Peachy, Mark Smith, Wilfred Williams; Goals: Robert Clark (5)		Tries: Martin Offiah (2), Paul Groves, Ellery Hanley, Andy Currier; Goals: Andy Currier (4)

Wade Park, Orange
Attendance: 3,520
Referee: Phil Robinson

Western Division: Frail, Wilfred Williams, Casey, Mark Smith, Newman, Clark, Douglas, Gibson, Luke, McAnally, Fitzgerald, Michael Peachy, Moy. Res - Stammers, Batty

Great Britain: Ian Wilkinson, Carl Gibson, Andy Currier, Darren Wright, Martin Offiah, Ellery Hanley (c), Mike Ford, Brian Case, Paul Groves, Hugh Waddell, Karl Fairbank, Paul Hulme, Mike Gregory.

With Great Britain leading 26–10 with 20 minutes to go, the local forwards rallied strongly to give the Lions a fright.

Tuesday, 5 July

President's XIII	24 – 16	Great Britain
Tries: Steve O'Brien, Glenn Lazarus, Greg Alexander, Mal Meninga, Graeme Bradley; Goals: Mal Meninga (2/6)		Tries: Phil Ford (2), Mike Gregory; Goals: Paul Loughlin (2/3)

Seiffert Oval, Queanbeyan
Attendance: 6,037
Referee: Eddie Ward (Australia)
Player of the Match: David Trewhella

President's XIII	Great Britain

FB	1	Phil Blake
LW	2	Steve O'Brien
CE	3	Mal Meninga
CE	4	Graeme Bradley
RW	5	Adam O'Neill
FE	6	Greg Florimo
HB	7	Greg Alexander
LK	8	David Trewhella
SR	9	Mark Geyer
SR	10	Gavin Miller
PR	11	David Gillespie
HK	12	Mario Fenech (c)
PR	13	Glenn Lazarus
Substitutions:
IC	14	Steve Robinson
IC	15	Ian Gately
Coach:
(Australia) Don Furner

FB	1	Phil Ford
RW	2	Carl Gibson
CE	3	Paul Loughlin
CE	4	Darren Wright
LW	5	Andy Currier
SO	6	David Hulme
SH	7	Andy Gregory
LF	8	John Joyner
SR	9	Richard Eyres
SR	10	Mike Gregory (c)
PR	11	Roy Powell
HK	12	Kevin Beardmore
PR	13	Kevin Ward
Substitutions:
IC	14	Paul Hulme
IC	15	Hugh Waddell
Coach:
(England) Mal Reilly

After playing the entire tour using the international numbers for the forwards (i.e. props with 8 and 10, loose forward with 13), Great Britain used the old standard still used in Australia until the end of the year with the props in 11 and 13, loose forward with 8.

The Don Furner coached President's XIII led 14–2 after 22 minutes thanks to tries by Steve O'Brien, Glenn Lazarus and 1986 Kangaroo tourist Greg Alexander. But after a second half try to Mal Meninga (who had an off day with the boot, kicking only 2 of his 6 attempts at goal), the Lions brought it back to 18–16 thanks to 2 tries from Welsh fullback Phil Ford and one to captain Mike Gregory plus the more accurate goal kicking of St Helens centre Paul Loughlin in the increasingly muddy conditions at the Seiffert Oval, the home ground of the Canberra Raiders. However, a late try to Penrith centre Graeme Bradley put the game beyond the reach of the tourists. South Sydney's Mario Fenech, playing at hooker, was given the honour of captaining the President's XIII.

The President's XIII was a side selected by Australian Rugby League President, Ken Arthurson.

=== 3rd Ashes Test ===
This match also counted toward the result of the 1985–1988 World Cup tournament. Australia were considered favourites, having won the past fifteen consecutive test matches. Great Britain's chances were also lessened by the squad missing the likes of Shaun Edwards, Kevin Beardmore, Steve Hampson, Andy Platt, Garry Schofield, Joe Lydon, Lee Crooks and Andy Goodway for one reason or another, and some players taking to the field not fully fit. It was the debut of Paul Hulme and Hugh Waddell in the front row. The match was broadcast by the Nine network with commentary from Darrell Eastlake and Jack Gibson - but it was a delayed telecast at 8.30pm.

Saturday, 9 July

Australia	12 – 26	Great Britain
Tries: Wally Lewis; Sam Backo Goals: Michael O'Connor (2/2)		Tries: Henderson Gill (2); Martin Offiah; Phil Ford; Mike Gregory; Goals: Paul Loughlin (3/5)

Sydney Football Stadium, Sydney
Attendance: 15,944
Referee: Francis Desplas (France)
Player of the Match: Andy Gregory

Australia	Great Britain

FB	1	Garry Jack
RW	2	Andrew Ettingshausen
CE	3	Michael O'Connor
CE	4	Peter Jackson
LW	5	Tony Currie
FE	6	Wally Lewis (c)
HB	7	Peter Sterling
PR	8	Martin Bella
HK	9	Greg Conescu
PR	10	Sam Backo
SR	11	Wally Fullerton-Smith
SR	12	Paul Vautin
LK	13	Wayne Pearce
Substitutions:
IC	14	Gary Belcher
IC	15	Bob Lindner
Coach:
(Australia) Don Furner

FB	1	Phil Ford
RW	2	Henderson Gill
CE	3	David Stephenson
CE	4	Paul Loughlin
LW	5	Martin Offiah
SO	6	David Hulme
SH	7	Andy Gregory
PR	8	Kevin Ward
HK	9	Paul Hulme
PR	10	Hugh Waddell
SR	11	Mike Gregory
SR	12	Roy Powell
LF	13	Ellery Hanley (c)
Substitutions:
IC	14	Brian Case
IC	15	Darren Wright
Coach:
(England) Mal Reilly

Early in the match Great Britain were disallowed a try when Henderson Gill dived onto an Andy Gregory bomb which was not secured by the Australian fullback. The Kangaroos then had chances to score at the other end of the field, but the British defence held strong. The first try of the match would go to the visitors when, playing the ball inside Australia's twenty-two, they strung some passes together, getting the ball out to Martin Offiah who dove over the line on the right wing. The conversion attempt was missed so the score was 0–4 with over three quarters of the match still to be played. A few minutes later Great Britain were again on the attack in Australia's territory and keeping the ball alive, their scrum half back Andy Gregory darting about elusively before passing it to Ford who stepped and weaved his way amongst the defenders to dash through and score near the uprights. The conversion was successful, giving Great Britain a 0–10 lead. Shortly before half-time Australia suffered a major setback when their halfback Peter Sterling was forced off with a dislocated shoulder after being driven into the turf in a tackle by Roy Powell. No more points were scored in the first half, so this was the score at the break.

Australia scored first in the second half after winning a scrum against the feed within Great Britain's twenty-two. Working the ball up close to the uprights, their captain Wally Lewis got it at first receiver and ran it into the defence, wrestling his way through to the tryline where he reached out and put it down beneath the black dot. The try was successfully converted, so the score was 6–10 in favour of the Lions. Great Britain then extended their lead after working the ball up into an attacking position where Andy Gregory chipped it ahead. In the rush of chasers from both sides trying to reach the ball it was knocked ahead into the in-goal area where Henderson Gill dived on it. The kick was successful so the British were leading 6–16. Again the Britons' failure to win a scrum in their own territory afforded Australia another opportunity, with forward Sam Backo crashing over the line shortly after from close range. The successful kick brought the Kangaroos back to within an unconverted try at 12–16. The Lions struck again from deep within their own half where centre Paul Loughlin got the ball at first receiver, ran through the defensive line and crossed half-way before passing to Henderson Gill in support on his outside to dive over on the right wing. The conversion attempt was missed, so the British lead was 12–20. Then they scored another long range try while working the ball away from their own line, Andy Gregory making a dart from dummy half, catching the markers napping and getting into open space. He then found Mike Gregory in support who ran about seventy metres to dive over under the posts. The easy kick meant a 26–12 lead for Great Britain and this is where the scoreboard remained at full-time.

Australian front row forward Sam Backo scored a try in all three tests. This saw him join legendary winger Ken Irvine (1963) as the only Australians to score a try in each test of an Ashes series.

This was the end of a 15-match winning streak for the Australians, and Great Britain's first Test victory over the Kangaroos since their 18–14 win at Odsal Stadium during the 1978 Kangaroo tour, as well as their first win in Australia for 18 years. It also put Great Britain on top of the World Cup points table.

After the match there was a gala dinner at the Regent Hotel.

== New Zealand ==
The Lions lost two of three of their matches in New Zealand.

Wednesday, 13 July

Wellington	18 – 24	Great Britain
Tries: Leuluai (2), Kuiti; Goals: Ewe (3)		Tries: Fairbank (2), Eyres, Currier; Goals: Loughlin (2), Currier, Stephenson

Porirua Park, Wellington
Attendance: 4,428
Referee: Des O'Sullivan

Tuesday, 19 July

Auckland	30 - 14	Great Britain
Tries: Shelford (2), Tuimavave, Brown, Leota; Goals: Brown (3), Bancroft (2)		Tries: Gill (2); Goals: Loughlin (3)

Mount Smart Stadium, Auckland
Attendance: 8,000
Referee: Bill Shrimpton

=== Test Match ===
The result of this match would determine who would contest the final of the 1985–1988 World Cup tournament's final to be played later in the year.

Sunday, 17 July

New Zealand	12 – 10	Great Britain
Tries: Gary Freeman (2) Goals: Peter Brown (2)		Tries: David Hulme; Paul Loughlin; Goals: Paul Loughlin (1)

Addington Showgrounds (Christchurch)
Attendance: 8,525
Referee: Mick Stone (Australia)

New Zealand	Great Britain

FB	1	Darrell Williams
RW	2	Shane Horo
CE	3	Dean Bell (c)
CE	4	Kevin Iro
LW	5	Gary Mercer
FE	6	Shane Cooper
HB	7	Clayton Friend
PR	8	Peter Brown
HK	9	Wayne Wallace
PR	10	Adrian Shelford
SR	11	Mark Graham
SR	12	Sam Stewart
LK	13	Mark Horo
Substitutions:
IC	14	Gary Freeman
IC	15
Coach:
(New Zealand) Tony Gordon

FB	1	Phil Ford
RW	2	Henderson Gill
CE	3	David Stephenson
CE	4	Paul Loughlin
LW	5	Martin Offiah
SO	6	David Hulme
SH	7	Andy Gregory
PR	8	Kevin Ward
HK	9	Kevin Beardmore
PR	10	Hugh Waddell
SR	11	Mike Gregory
SR	12	Roy Powell
LF	13	Ellery Hanley (c)
Substitutions:
IC	14	Paul Hulme
IC	15
Coach:
(England) Mal Reilly

It was a rainy afternoon in Christchurch. Following the national anthems "God Save the Queen" and "God Defend New Zealand", and a haka by the Kiwis, Great Britain kicked off. In slippery conditions New Zealand knocked during the first set of six. This resulted in a scrum to the visitors deep inside the Kiwis' territory. From the scrum win the ball was moved out to the left where a pass was knocked down by a New Zealand defender but re-gathered by British centre Paul Loughlin who dived over the line. The referee awarded the try which Loughlin failed to convert, so Great Britain got out to an early 4 nil lead. A few minutes later a penalty was awarded to the Lions but Loughlin's kick was again wide. Shortly after that New Zealand were awarded a penalty and Peter Brown kicked it successfully, bringing the margin back to two points at 2–4.

Great Britain captain Ellery Hanley sustained a cut under his eye during the match which required 12 stitches.

== Statistics ==
Leading try scorer

- 19 by Martin Offiah

Leading point scorer

- 90 by Paul Loughlin (1 try, 43 goals)

Largest attendance

- 27,130 – Second test vs Australia at Lang Park

Largest non-test attendance

- 21,131 – Manly-Warringah Sea Eagles vs Great Britain at Brookvale Oval
