= 1987–88 Rugby League Premiership =

1987–88 Premiership
- Structure: National knockout championship
- Winners: Widnes
- Runners-up: St Helens

The 1987–88 Rugby League Premiership was the 14th end of season Rugby League Premiership competition.

The winners were Widnes.

== First round ==
Date	Team one	Team two	Score
24 Apr	Bradford Northern	Leeds	32-18
24 Apr	St Helens	Castleford	40-8
24 Apr	Widnes	Halifax	36-26
24 Apr	Wigan	Warrington	12-24

== Semi-finals ==
Date	Team one	Team two	Score
8 May	St Helens	Bradford Northern	24-10
8 May	Widnes	Warrington	20-10

== Final ==
15 May 1988

Widnes	38-14	St Helens
T-Tait, D Wright, D Hulme (2), Sorensen, McKenzie; G-Platt, Currier(4)		T-Ledger, Haggerty; G-Loughlin (3)

Old Trafford
Attendance: 35,252
Referee: John Holdsworth
Player of the Match: David Hulme

1	Duncan Platt
2	Rick Thackray
3	Andy Currier
4	Darren Wright
5	Martin Offiah
6	Barry Dowd
7	David Hulme
8	Kurt Sorensen
9	Phil McKenzie
10	Joey Grima
11	Mike O'Neill
12	Paul Hulme
13	Richard Eyres
Substitutions:
14	Alan Tait for Rick Thackray
15	Steve O'Neill for Joey Grima
Coach:
Doug Laughton

1	Barry Ledger
2	David "Dave" Tanner
3	Paul Loughlin
4	Mark Elia
5	Les Quirk
6	Mark Bailey
7	Neil Holding
8	Tony Burke
9	Paul Groves
10	Stuart Evans
11	Paul Forber
12	Roy Haggerty
13	John Fieldhouse
Substitutions:
14	Bernard Dwyer for Stuart Evans
15	Shaun Allen for John Fieldhouse
Coach:
Alex Murphy
