= 1987–88 John Player Special Trophy =

- Structure: National knockout championship
- Teams: 36
- Winners: St. Helens
- Runners-up: Leeds

This was the seventeenth season for the League Cup, known as the John Player Special Trophy for sponsorship purposes.

St. Helens won the final, beating Leeds by the score of 15-14. The match was played at Central Park, Wigan. The attendance was 16,669 and receipts were £62232.

== Background ==
This season saw no changes in the entrants, no new members and no withdrawals, the number remaining at thirty-six
Blackpool Borough moved to Springfield Park in Wigan and renamed as Springfield Borough

== Competition and results ==
=== Preliminary round ===
Involved 4 matches and 8 Clubs

Game No	Fixture Date	Home team	Score	Away team	Venue	Att	Rec	Notes	Ref
1	Sat 31 Oct 1987	Heworth	5-32	Swinton	Clarence Street	1063		1	
2	Sun 1 Nov 1987	Featherstone Rovers	34-16	Thatto Heath	Post Office Road	1045		2	
3	Sun 1 Nov 1987	York	38-2	Bramley	Clarence Street	1174		3	
4	Sun 8 Nov 1987	Oldham	36-8	Fulham	Watersheddings	3197			

=== Round 1 - First Round ===
Involved 16 matches and 32 Clubs

Game No	Fixture Date	Home team	Score	Away team	Venue	Att	Rec	Notes	Ref
1	Fri 13 Nov 1987	Springfield Borough	14-2	Barrow	Springfield Park	629			
2	Sat 14 Nov 1987	Oldham	22-6	Bradford Northern	Watersheddings	4858			
3	Sat 14 Nov 1987	St. Helens	12-10	Widnes	Knowsley Road	7322			
4	Sun 15 Nov 1987	Batley	18-16	Hunslet	Mount Pleasant	1117			
5	Sun 15 Nov 1987	Carlisle	16-22	Warrington	Brunton Park	1055			
6	Sun 15 Nov 1987	Dewsbury	14-12	Doncaster	Crown Flatt	1081			
7	Sun 15 Nov 1987	Featherstone Rovers	12-34	Castleford	Post Office Road	3376			
8	Sun 15 Nov 1987	Keighley	6-32	Halifax	Thrum Hall	5236		4	
9	Sun 15 Nov 1987	Hull F.C.	42-6	Workington Town	Boulevard	2447			
10	Sun 15 Nov 1987	Hull Kingston Rovers	30-12	Rochdale Hornets	Craven Park (1)	2308			
11	Sun 15 Nov 1987	Leigh	28-12	Huddersfield Barracudas	Hilton Park	2082			
12	Sun 15 Nov 1987	Runcorn Highfield	4-6	Mansfield Marksman	Canal Street	514			
13	Sun 15 Nov 1987	Swinton	12-18	Salford	Station Road	3459			
14	Sun 15 Nov 1987	Wakefield Trinity	22-22	York	Belle Vue	1864			
15	Sun 15 Nov 1987	Whitehaven	14-18	Leeds	Recreation Ground	3663			
16	Sun 15 Nov 1987	Wigan	34-8	Sheffield Eagles	Central Park	7484			

=== Round 1 - First Round Replays ===
Involved 1 match and 2 Clubs

Game No	Fixture Date	Home team	Score	Away team	Venue	Att	Rec	Notes	Ref
1	Wed 18 Nov 1987	York	6-30	Wakefield Trinity	Clarence Street	1467			

=== Round 2 - Second Round ===
Involved 8 matches and 16 Clubs

Game No	Fixture Date	Home team	Score	Away team	Venue	Att	Rec	Notes	Ref
1	Sat 21 Nov 1987	Wigan	26-16	Castleford	Central Park	9613			
2	Sun 22 Nov 1987	Batley	0-44	Oldham	Mount Pleasant	2808			
3	Sun 22 Nov 1987	Hull F.C.	19-7	Leigh	Boulevard	3982			
4	Sun 22 Nov 1987	Leeds	20-10	Halifax	Headingley	13498			
5	Sun 22 Nov 1987	St. Helens	40-0	Mansfield Marksman	Knowsley Road	4966			
6	Sun 22 Nov 1987	Salford	14-5	Dewsbury	The Willows	2129			
7	Sun 22 Nov 1987	Springfield Borough	14-8	Wakefield Trinity	Springfield Park	1265			
8	Sun 22 Nov 1987	Warrington	12-8	Hull Kingston Rovers	Wilderspool	4550			

=== Round 3 -Quarter Finals ===
Involved 4 matches with 8 clubs

Game No	Fixture Date	Home team	Score	Away team	Venue	Att	Rec	Notes	Ref
1	Sat 28 Nov 1987	Warrington	10-14	Oldham	Wilderspool	5152			
2	Sun 29 Nov 1987	St. Helens	20-16	Hull F.C.	Knowsley Road	7400			
3	Sun 29 Nov 1987	Salford	12-16	Wigan	The Willows	7986			
4	Sun 29 Nov 1987	Springfield Borough	12-22	Leeds	Springfield Park	3894			

=== Round 4 – Semi-Finals ===
Involved 2 matches and 4 Clubs

Game No	Fixture Date	Home team	Score	Away team	Venue	Att	Rec	Notes	Ref
1	Sat 12 Dec 1987	Leeds	19-6	Wigan	Burnden Park	13538			
2	Sat 19 Dec 1987	St. Helens	18-8	Oldham	Knowsley Road	8136			

=== Final ===
Game No	Fixture Date	Home team	Score	Away team	Venue	Att	Rec	Notes	Ref
	Saturday 9 January 1988	St. Helens	15-14	Leeds	Central Park	16669	62232	5	

==== Teams and scorers ====
St. Helens	№	Leeds
	teams	
Phil Veivers	1	Marty Gurr
Dave Tanner	2	Steve Morris
Paul Loughlin	3	Garry Schofield
Mark Elia	4	Peter Jackson
Les Quirk	5	John Basnett
Shane Cooper	6	David Creasser
Neil Holding	7	Ray Ashton
Tony Burke	8	Peter Tunks
Paul Groves	9	Colin Maskill
Peter Souto	10	Kevin Rayne
Paul Forber	11	Roy Powell
Roy Haggerty	12	Paul Medley
Andy Platt	13	David Heron
David Large (for ?)	14	Carl Gibson (for John Basnett)
Stuart Evans (for Peter Souto)	15	xJohn Fairbank (for Kevin Rayne)
Alex Murphy	Coach	Maurice Bamford
15	score	14
9	HT	14
	Scorers	
	Tries	
Paul Loughlin (2)	T	Peter Jackson (1)
	T	David Creasser (1)
	Goals	
Paul Loughlin (3)	G	David Creasser (3)
	Drop Goals	
Neil Holding (1)	DG	
Referee		G. Frederick "Fred" Lindop (Wakefield)
Man of the match		Paul Loughlin - St Helens - Centre
Competition Sponsor		John Player Special

Scoring - Try = four points - Goal = two points - Drop goal = one point

=== Prize money ===
As part of the sponsorship deal and funds, the prize money awarded to the competing teams for this season is as follows :-

Finish Position	Cash prize	No. receiving prize	Total cash
Winner	?	1	?
Runner-up	?	1	?
semi-finalist	?	2	?
loser in Rd 3	?	4	?
loser in Rd 2	?	8	?
Loser in Rd 1	?	16	?
Loser in Prelim Round	?	?	?
Grand Total			

Note - the author is unable to trace the award amounts for this season. Can anyone help ?

=== The road to success ===
This tree excludes any preliminary round fixtures

First round
St. Helens	12
Widnes	10
Runcorn Highfield	4
Mansfield Marksman	6
Hull F.C.	42
Workington Town	6
Leigh	28
Huddersfield Barracudas	12
Carlisle	16
Warrington	22
Hull Kingston Rovers	30
Rochdale Hornets	12
Batley	18
Hunslet	16
Oldham	22
Bradford Northern	6
Springfield Borough	14
Barrow	2
Wakefield Trinity	22 (30)
York	22 (6)
Whitehaven	14
Leeds	18
Keighley	6
Halifax	32
Swinton	12
Salford	18
Dewsbury	14
Doncaster	12
Wigan	34
Sheffield Eagles	8
Featherstone Rovers	12
Castleford	34

Second round
St. Helens	40
Mansfield Marksman	0
Hull F.C.	19
Leigh	7
Warrington	12
Hull Kingston Rovers	8
Batley	0
Oldham	44
Springfield Borough	14
Wakefield Trinity	8
Leeds	20
Halifax	10
Salford	14
Dewsbury	5
Wigan	26
Castleford	16

Third round
St. Helens	20
Hull F.C.	16
Warrington	10
Oldham	14
Springfield Borough	12
Leeds	22
Salford	12
Wigan	16

Semifinals
St. Helens	18
Oldham	8
Leeds	19
Wigan	6

Final
St. Helens	15
Leeds	14

== Notes and comments ==
1 * Heworth are a Junior (amateur) club from York
2 * Thatto Heath are a Junior (amateur) club from St Helens
3 * RUGBYLEAGUEproject give score as 38-2 but Wigan official archives gives it as 37-2
4 * RUGBYLEAGUEproject give Halifax at home but Wigan official archives gives Keighley at home but with a reference that the game was played at Thrum Hall, the home of Halifax
5 * Central Park was the home ground of Wigan with a final capacity of 18,000, although the record attendance was 47,747 for Wigan v St Helens 27 March 1959

== See also ==
- 1987-88 Rugby Football League season
- 1987 Lancashire Cup
- 1987 Yorkshire Cup
- John Player Special Trophy
- Rugby league county cups
