= Frendo =

Frendo is a surname. Notable people with the surname include:

- Cleavon Frendo (born 1985), Maltese footballer
- George Anthony Frendo (born 1946), Maltese Roman Catholic bishop
- Glen Frendo, Australian rugby league player
- Henry Frendo (born 1948), Maltese historian
- Michael Frendo (born 1955), Maltese politician
