= Steve Walters (disambiguation) =

Steve Walters (born 1965) is an Australian rugby league player.

Steve or Steven Walters may also refer to:

- Steve Walters (footballer) (born 1972), English footballer
- Steve Walters (rugby league, born 1967) (born 1967), Australian rugby league player associated with Newcastle Knights

== See also ==
- Stephen Walters (born 1975), English actor
