= David Stephenson (rugby league, born 1958) =

GB international rugby league footballer (1958–2022)

Personal information
- Full name: David R. Stephenson
- Born: 3 December 1958 Lytham St Annes, Lancashire, England
- Died: 14 March 2022 (aged 63)

Playing information

Rugby union
Club
| Years | Team | Pld | T | G | FG | P |
|---|---|---|---|---|---|---|
| 1977–79 | Fylde |

Rugby league
- Position: Wing, Centre
Club
| Years | Team | Pld | T | G | FG | P |
|---|---|---|---|---|---|---|
| 1979–82 | Salford | 97 | 36 | 2 | 4 | 116 |
| 1982–87 | Wigan | 214 | 71 | 286 | 6 | 845 |
| 1987–89 | Leeds | 36 | 5 | 89 | 0 | 198 |
| 1989–90 | Leigh | 22 | 3 | 2 | 0 | 16 |
| 1991 | Salford | 1 | 1 | 0 | 0 | 4 |
| | Total | 370 | 116 | 379 | 10 | 1179 |
Representative
| Years | Team | Pld | T | G | FG | P |
| 1982–88 | Great Britain | 10 | 2 | 12 | 0 | 32 |
| 1980–86 | Lancashire | 6 | 4 | 3 | 0 | 19 |

David R. Stephenson (3 December 1958 – 14 March 2022) was an English rugby union and professional rugby league footballer who played in the 1970s, 1980s, and 1990s. He played club level rugby union for Fylde Rugby Club, and representative level rugby league for Great Britain, and at club level for Salford (two spells), Wigan, Leeds and Leigh, as a goal-kicking wing or centre.

== Background ==
Stephenson was born in Lytham St Annes, Lancashire, England, and he was a pupil at Arnold School in Blackpool. He was the son of professional footballer, Len Stephenson.

== Playing career ==
=== Early career ===
Stephenson started his career as a rugby union player, and represented England at schoolboy level. He made his debut for Fylde RFC in 1977. He switched to rugby league in 1979, joining Salford.

=== Wigan ===
Stephenson left Salford for Wigan in 1982 for a club record fee of £60,000. He won caps for Great Britain while at Wigan in 1982 against Australia (2 matches).

Stephenson played right-centre in the 15–4 victory over Leeds in the 1982–83 John Player Trophy Final at Elland Road, Leeds on Saturday 22 January 1983.

Stephenson played right-centre, in the 6–19 defeat by Widnes in the 1984 Challenge Cup Final at Wembley Stadium, London on Saturday 5 May 1984.

Stephenson played right-centre, in the 18–26 defeat by St. Helens in the 1984 Lancashire Cup Final at Central Park, Wigan, on Sunday 28 October 1984, played right-centre, and scored a goal in the 28–24 victory over Hull F.C. in 1985 Challenge Cup Final at Wembley Stadium, London on Saturday 4 May 1985, in front of a crowd of 99,801.

Stephenson played right-centre, and scored 3-goals in the 14–8 victory over New Zealand at Central Park, Wigan on Sunday 6 October 1985, played right-centre, and scored 7-goals in the 34–8 victory over Warrington in the 1985 Lancashire Cup Final at Knowsley Road, St. Helens on Sunday 13 October 1985, played right-centre, and scored a goal in the 11–8 victory over Hull Kingston Rovers in the 1985–86 John Player Special Trophy Final at Elland Road, Leeds on Saturday 11 January 1986. He received Wigan's "Player of the Year" award for the 1985–86 season.

Stephenson played for Great Britain in 1986 against Australia, played right-centre, in the 27–6 victory over Oldham in the 1986 Lancashire Cup Final at Knowsley Road, St. Helens on Sunday 19 October 1986, played right wing, in the 18–4 victory over Warrington in the 1986–87 John Player Special Trophy Final at Burnden Park, Bolton on Saturday 10 January 1987, played in the victory in the Championship during the 1986–87 season, played right-centre, and scored a goal in the 8–0 victory over Warrington in the 1986–87 Premiership Final at Old Trafford, Manchester on Sunday 17 May 1987.

Stephenson played right-centre, and scored 4-goals for all of Wigan's points in the 8–4 victory over Manly-Warringah Sea Eagles in the 1987 World Club Challenge at Central Park, Wigan on Wednesday 7 October 1987, played right-centre, and scored a goal in the 28–16 victory over Warrington in the 1987 Lancashire Cup Final at Knowsley Road, St Helens on Sunday 11 October 1987. In 1987 Stephenson also represented Great Britain against France, and Papua New Guinea.

=== Leeds ===
In January 1988, Stephenson was signed by Leeds for a fee of £75,000.

Stephenson played left-centre and scored 6-goals, setting the most goals in a Yorkshire Cup Final record, in Leeds' 33–12 victory over Castleford in the 1988 Yorkshire Cup Final at Elland Road, Leeds, on Sunday 16 October 1988. While at Leeds he played for Great Britain in 1988 against France, Papua New Guinea, Australia (2 matches), and New Zealand, and he was selected to go on the 1988 Great Britain Lions tour.
