= Garry Schofield =

GB & England international rugby league footballer

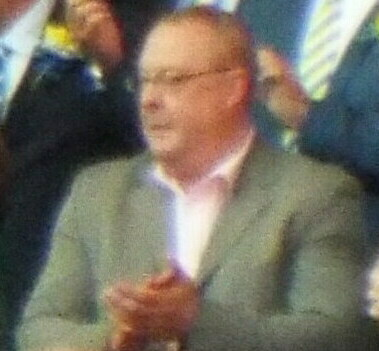
- Schofield in 2015

Personal information
- Full name: Garry Edward Schofield
- Born: 1 July 1965 (age 60) Leeds, West Riding of Yorkshire, England

Playing information
- Position: Centre, Stand-off
Club
Years	Team	Pld	T	G	FG	P
1983–87	Hull FC	122	107	199	2	828
1985–87(loan)	→ Balmain Tigers	47	28	9	4	134
1987–96	Leeds	250	147	64	30	746
1989(loan)	→ Western Suburbs	9	5	1	1	23
1996–98	Huddersfield Giants	48	24	15	6	132
1999	Doncaster	7	1	0	0	4
1999	Bramley	19	1	0	1	5
	Total	502	313	288	44	1872
Representative
Years	Team	Pld	T	G	FG	P
1984–95	England	3	1	0	0	4
1984–94	Great Britain	46	31	9	7	149

Coaching information
Club
Years	Team	Gms	W	D	L	W%
1998	Huddersfield Giants	13	2	0	11	15
2011	Barrow Raiders	5	2	0	3	40
	Total	18	4	0	14	22

Garry Edward Schofield OBE (born 1 July 1965) is an English former professional rugby league footballer who played in the 1980s and 1990s, and is a member of the British Rugby League Hall of Fame.

At the time of his retirement he was the most-capped Great Britain player of all time along with Mick Sullivan, with 46 appearances. He also won three England caps. He won the 1990 Rugby League World Golden Boot Award as the greatest player on the planet, largely due to his exceptional performances in Great Britain's backs-against-the-wall Test-series win in New Zealand and his remarkable display as Great Britain beat Australia at Wembley 19–12. The award to Schofield was made retrospectively in 2011 by Rugby League World magazine.

== Club career ==
=== Hull FC ===
Schofield made his début for Hull FC as a 17 year old in 1983. Schofield played at centre, in Hull FC's 13–2 victory over Castleford in the 1983 Yorkshire Cup Final at Elland Road, Leeds on Saturday 15 October 1983, picking up his first piece of silverware.

More success came for Schofield the following season in 1984 when he scored 4-conversions and a drop goals in the 29–12 victory over Hull Kingston Rovers in the 1984 Yorkshire Cup Final at Boothferry Park, Hull on Saturday 27 October 1984. That season he went on to be the division's top try scorer.

In 1985 Schofield played as a substitute replacing Fullback Gary Kemble in Hull Kingston Rovers' 12–0 victory over Hull F.C. in the 1984–85 League Cup Final during the 1984–85 season at Boothferry Park on Saturday 26 January 1985. The same year, Schofield was a substitute in Hull FC's 24–28 defeat by Wigan in the 1985 Challenge Cup Final at Wembley Stadium, London on Saturday 4 May 1985, in front of a crowd of 99,801, in what is regarded as one of the greatest cup finals in living memory, which Hull narrowly lost after fighting back from 12–28 down at half-time.

In 1986 Schofield played at centre in the 24–31 defeat by Castleford in the 1986 Yorkshire Cup Final at Headingley, Leeds on Saturday 11 October 1986.

Due to Hull's financial difficulties in the late 80s, they were forced to sell Schofield to Yorkshire rivals Leeds in 1987.

=== Sydney ===
Moving to Sydney, Schofield spent the 1985, 1986 and 1987 NSWRL seasons with the Balmain Tigers club and gained the rare distinction for a British footballer of becoming the season's top try-scorer in 1986 (he crossed for 13 tries to finish equal with Manly-Warringah's Phil Blake). A year earlier, the Balmain Tigers won the National Panasonic Cup – Schofield's only major winner's medal at club level (not including the 1988 Yorkshire County Cup which he won at Leeds).

In his three seasons with Balmain, he scored 28 tries, nine goals and four drop-goals in just 45 appearances. He scored a try on his full debut against Parramatta Eels after he took an interception from his former Hull FC teammate, Peter Sterling.

He did not play in the 1988 Winfield Cup as he was touring with the Lions, but returned in 1989 to play for lowly Western Suburbs Magpies. Ellery Hanley, Schofield's international teammate who had led Balmain to the 1988 NSWRL Grand Final, recommended him to the club. Schofield scored five tries in eight starts for the club.

In 2012, Schofield and Hanley were inducted into the Wests Tigers Hall of Fame.

=== Leeds ===
Schofield moved from Hull to his home town club Leeds in 1987 for what then was a world record fee of £155,000. In 1988 Schofield was named the costliest player in world rugby league.

Schofield played at centre and scored 2-tries, and a drop goal in Leeds' 33–12 victory over Castleford in the 1988 Yorkshire County Cup Final at Elland Road on Sunday 16 October 1988.

Schofield played at centre in Leeds' 14–15 defeat by St. Helens in the 1988–89 League Cup Final at Central Park on Saturday 9 January 1988.

In 1991 Schofield won the Man of Steel Award for player of the season.

He made over 250 appearances for Leeds, scoring 147 tries and 746 points.

=== Huddersfield ===
Schofield finally left Leeds in 1996, joining Huddersfield for a six-figure sum. After helping Huddersfield into Super League, and went on to become player-coach but was dismissed after 13 games, having picked up two wins and only playing twice for the club in Super League.

=== Doncaster and Bramley ===
After he was dismissed from Huddersfield, Schofield signed for Doncaster in 1999 where he made seven appearances before signing for Bramley the same season. He retired at the end of the season.

== International career ==
=== Great Britain ===
Schofield made his début for Great Britain in his first season in 1984 and went on to be selected for the 1984 Great Britain Lions tour of Australia at the age of just 18. Although Australia swept the Lions 3–0 in The Ashes series, Schofield won praise from the Aussie players, press and even the public for his clever play and electrifying running game.

In 1985, Schofield re-wrote the record books by scoring four tries for Great Britain as they beat New Zealand in the second Test series at Central Park, Wigan. The series ended 1–1, with the third game drawn.

He was selected to go on the 1988 Great Britain Lions tour. In 1990, as vice-captain, Schofield was outstanding in Great Britain's series triumph in New Zealand and then in the shock 19–12 victory over Australia in the first Ashes test at Wembley.

Schofield experienced possibly his finest hour when captaining the 1992 Great Britain Lions tour of Australia and New Zealand with a magnificent 33–10 win over Australia in the second test at Princes Park in Melbourne, with Schofield a clear choice as man-of-the-match. But the Ashes were once again lost by two games to one. Due to an injury suffered by Hanley, Schofield captained the Lions in all 6 tests on the tour. Later that year Schofield retained the captaincy over Hanley for the World Cup Final against Australia played at Wembley Stadium (Hanley was the 1992 Lions tour captain but only played 15 minutes on tour due to injury). In front of an international rugby league world record crowd of 73,631 Australia prevailed over their British rivals, winning 10–6 thanks to a late Steve Renouf try. Schofield retaining the Lions captaincy for the World Cup Final would lead to personal animosity between himself and Hanley for a number of years.

A year later, Schofield captained Great Britain to a superb 3–0 series whitewash over New Zealand before ending his Test career with two appearances in the 1994 Ashes series. With Hanley taking over from Mal Reilly as Great Britain coach in 1994, Schofield was controversially overlooked for selection for the first test at Wembley, won 8–4 by the Lions, but was selected to the bench for the final two tests. It was Schofield's enterprising play in the second test at Old Trafford, won 34–8 by Australia, that saw Britain temporarily come to life in the second half of the game. Surprisingly, Hanley then chose to play Wigan loose forward Phil Clarke at stand-off instead of prompting Schofield from the bench in the 3rd and deciding test at Elland Road and Australia went on to win the game (and thus the series) 23–4. The rumoured animosity between Hanley and Schofield was said to be behind Hanley's decision not to start his Leeds teammate in the test decider.

=== England ===
Schofield controversially missed out on selection for England's 1995 World Cup squad. But he did enough in the Test arena to win the respect of the usually hard-to-please Australians. When asked in 2010 by Rugby League World who was the best British player he faced, the Australian legend Brett Kenny replied, "Garry Schofield – he was a great player and a real thorn in the side of anyone he came across. He could score tries from nothing when he was a young centre and then he went on to become a very good stand-off and a very good leader."

== Coaching career ==
=== Huddersfield ===
After helping Huddersfield into Super League, Schofield took over the coaching reins but was dismissed after winning just two of his first 13 games. He later successfully sued the club for unfair dismissal. It took Huddersfield's next three coaches – Mal Reilly, John Kear and Tony Smith – more than 13 games to register two wins, with the club so far off the pace in their early Super League years. It was only after relegation and promotion under Smith that they became competitive.

=== BARLA and South Africa ===
In 2010, Schofield coached the British Amateur Rugby League Association Young Lions (Under 19s) in May & June. He led the Lions to five wins from five and players such as Tom Spencer (Wigan), Daniel Rooney (Workington Town) and Alex Walmsley (Batley) have since graced the professional ranks.

After being impressed by his coaching, he was invited to assist South Africa in 2010 and 2011.

=== Barrow ===
In late 2010, Schofield was appointed to coach high-flying, big-spending Barrow in the Championship, although he was fired after only 5 games in 2011 after a personality clash with the club's chairman Des Johnston, who was later that year banned from the sport for eight years by the Rugby Football League.

== Honours ==
=== Hull ===
- Yorkshire Cup:

- Winners: 1983, 1984
- Runner up: 1986

- Challenge Cup:

- Runner up: 1985

- League Cup:

- Runner up: 1985

=== Balmain ===
- Amco Cup:

- Winners: 1985

=== Leeds ===
- Yorkshire Cup:

- Winners: 1988

- League Cup:

- Runner up: 1988

=== Individual ===
- Man of Steel: 1991
- Golden Boot: 1990
- Officer of the Order of the British Empire: 1994
- Wests Tigers Hall of Fame: 2012
- British Rugby League Hall of Fame: 2013

Arriva Yorkshire honoured 13 rugby league footballers on Thursday 20 August 2009, at a ceremony at Wheldon Road, the home of Castleford. A fleet of new buses were named after the 'Arriva Yorkshire Rugby League Dream Team'. Members of the public nominated the best ever rugby league footballers to have played in West Yorkshire, supported by local rugby league journalists; James Deighton from BBC Leeds, and Tim Butcher, managing director of League Publications Ltd, who publish League Express and Rugby League World. The 'Arriva Yorkshire Rugby League Dream Team' included Schofield.

== After playing ==
After retiring, Schofield became a media pundit and is well known for being controversial. He is a regular columnist for the weekly League Express newspaper as well as for the Sunday version of the national newspaper the Daily Star.

Schofield is also a pundit for Talksport radio, and Proper Sport as well as appearing regularly on Premier Sports' 'Rugby League Back Chat'.

Schofield released his autobiography, Tries the Limit in 2001.

In 2013, he was named as the eighth best player worldwide to have played rugby league since 1980, in a book entitled 'Rugby League: A Critical History, 1980–2013' which was written by the League Express journalist Richard de la Riviere.

Achievements
Preceded by Lee Crooks	Rugby league transfer record Hull FC to Leeds; 1987–1989	Succeeded by Graham Steadman
