= Phil Ford (rugby) =

GB & Wales international rugby league and union footballer

Personal information
- Full name: Philip G. Ford
- Born: 16 March 1961 (age 64) Cardiff, Wales

Playing information

Rugby union
Club
Years	Team	Pld	T	G	FG	P
1981	Cardiff
1995	Rumney
1996–97	Pontypool	24
	Total	24	0	0	0	0

Rugby league
- Position: Fullback, Wing, Centre
Club
Years	Team	Pld	T	G	FG	P
1981–85	Warrington	112	57	3	0	201
1985	Wigan	15	16	0	0	64
1985–88	Bradford Northern	107	59	3	9	251
1988–92	Leeds	94+2	50	1	1	203
1992–95	Salford	93	55	0	0	220
	Total	423	237	7	10	939
Representative
Years	Team	Pld	T	G	FG	P
1985–89	Great Britain	13	9	0	0	36
1993–95	Wales	8	4	0	0	16
1987	Rugby League XIII	1	1	0	0	4
1988	GB tour games	8	7	0	0	28

Phil Ford (born 16 March 1961) is a Welsh former rugby union and professional rugby league footballer who played in the 1980s and 1990s. He played club level rugby union (RU) for Rumney RFC and Cardiff RFC, and representative level rugby league (RL) for Great Britain and Wales, and at club level for Warrington, Wigan, Bradford Northern, Leeds and Salford, as a fullback, wing or centre.

== Career ==
=== Club career ===
Ford initially played rugby union in Wales at club level for Cardiff RFC and Rumney RFC. He changed rugby football codes from rugby union to rugby league when he transferred to Warrington during 1981.

Ford joined Wigan in 1985, but was sold to Bradford Northern a few months later as part of Wigan's signing of Ellery Hanley.

Ford played on the wing in Bradford Northern's 12–12 draw with Castleford in the 1987 Yorkshire Cup Final during the 1987–88 season at Headingley, Leeds on Saturday 17 October 1987, and played on the wing in the 11–2 victory in the replay during the 1987–88 season at Elland Road, Leeds on Saturday 31 October 1987.

In December 1988, Ford was signed by Leeds in a deal worth £95,000. In August 1992, he was transferred to Salford in exchange for Mick Worrall.

=== International career ===
Ford was selected to go on the 1988 Great Britain Lions tour. He was a member of the Great Britain team that won the third Ashes Test in Australia, and was nicknamed The Rubber Man by the Australian media due to his elusive running style. It was their first victory over Australia since the second Test at Odsal Stadium, Bradford during 1978. He was selected for Wales (RL) to compete in the 1995 Rugby League World Cup. Following his rugby league career, he returned to live in Cardiff, and he changed codes from rugby league to rugby union when he transferred to Rumney RFC.

== Personal life ==
His brother Steve Ford was a Wales national rugby union team footballer, who was suspended for a period for having played a rugby league trial with Leeds. His nephew is Wales rugby league international Lloyd White.
