= 1984–85 Challenge Cup =

Rugby league competition

1984–85 Silk Cut Challenge Cup
- Duration: 6 Rounds
- Number of teams: 36
- Broadcast partners: BBC
- Winners: Wigan
- Runners-up: Hull
- Lance Todd Trophy: Brett Kenny

The 1984–85 Challenge Cup was the 84th staging of rugby league's oldest knockout competition, the Challenge Cup. The 1984–85 Rugby Football League season's tournament was known as the Silk Cut Challenge Cup for sponsorship reasons. It culminated in a final contested by Wigan and Hull F.C. at Wembley, London before a crowd of 99,801. Wigan won the match 28–24 with their Australian stand-off half, Brett Kenny winning the Lance Todd Trophy as man of the match.

== Preliminary round ==
Tie no	Date	Home team	Score	Away team	Attendance
1	27 Jan	Leeds	68–6	Bridgend	3,692
2	29 Jan	Barrow	12–26	Halifax	2,925
3	29 Jan	Salford	14–6	Featherstone Rovers	1,652
4	3 Feb	Doncaster	6–25	Wakefield Trinity	852

== First round ==
Tie no	Date	Home team	Score	Away team	Attendance
1	9 Feb	Leeds	4–14	Widnes	6,778
2	10 Feb	Fulham	4–17	Halifax	1,095
3	10 Feb	Keighley	5–12	Runcorn Highfield	837
4	14 Feb	Hull	52–6	Carlisle	4,588
5	17 Feb	Bramley	16–15	Blackpool Borough	614
6	17 Feb	Oldham	8–14	Castleford	6,056
7	17 Feb	Sheffield Eagles	19–54	Warrington	1,479
8	17 Feb	Wigan	46–8	Batley	9,606
9	17 Feb	Workington Town	28–6	Dewsbury	858
10	20 Feb	Rochdale Hornets	11–5	York F.C.	463
11	20 Feb	Salford	31–6	Swinton	4,267
12	21 Feb	St. Helens	3–8	Hull Kingston Rovers	9,292
13	24 Feb	Leigh	14–6	Huddersfield	4,297
14	24 Feb	Mansfield Marksman	10–34	Hunslet	1,346
15	24 Feb	Southend Invicta	18–50	Bradford Northern	3,297
16	24 Feb	Whitehaven	8–10	Wakefield Trinity	1,907

== Second round ==
Tie no	Date	Home team	Score	Away team	Attendance
1	23 Feb	Warrington	14–24	Wigan	8,614
2	24 Feb	Bramley	24–10	Salford	3,012
3	24 Feb	Castleford	64–4	Workington Town	3,498
4	24 Feb	Halifax	6–22	Hull	9,362
5	24 Feb	Rochdale Hornets	4–38	Hull Kingston Rovers	3,449
6	24 Feb	Widnes	36–11	Runcorn Highfield	5,528
7	27 Feb	Bradford Northern	13–2	Wakefield Trinity	3,413
8	27 Feb	Leigh	27–28	Hunslet	3,780

== Third round ==
Tie no	Date	Home team	Score	Away team	Attendance
1	9 Mar	Hull	6–6	Widnes	11,411
Replay	13 Mar	Widnes	12–19	Hull	11,447
2	10 Mar	Bradford Northern	6–7	Wigan	15,212
3	10 Mar	Castleford	58–18	Bramley	4,357
4	10 Mar	Hunslet	7–27	Hull Kingston Rovers	6,945

== Semi final ==
23 March 1985

Wigan	18 – 11	Hull Kingston Rovers
Try: Juliff, Stephenson, Gill; Goal: Stephenson (2), Gill	Report	Try: Miller, Clark; Goal: Fairbairn; Drop goal: Harkin

Elland Road, Leeds
Attendance: 19,275

6 April 1985

Castleford	10 – 10	Hull
Try: Hyde, Joyner; Goal: Hyde	Report	Try: O'Hara, Sterling; Goal: Crooks

Headingley, Leeds
Attendance: 20,982

=== Replay ===
10 April 1985

Castleford	16 – 22	Hull
Try: Hyde, Roockley, Chapman; Goal: Hyde (2)		Try: O'Hara, Sterling, James, Leuluai; Goal: Crooks (3)

Headingley, Leeds
Attendance: 20,968

== Final ==
This was the first meeting of Wigan and Hull F.C. in the Challenge Cup Final since 1959 when Wigan won 30–13. The attendance of 99,801 was the highest ever recorded for the Cup Final at Wembley Stadium.

Saturday 4 May 1985
3:00PM (BST)

Wigan	28 – 24	Hull
Tries: John Ferguson (2); Brett Kenny; Henderson Gill; Shaun Edwards; Goals: Henderson Gill (3/3); David Stephenson (1/3)	Report	Tries: Kevin James; Steve Evans; James Leuluai (2); Gary Divorty; Goals: Lee Crooks (2/5); Garry Schofield (0/2)

Wembley Stadium, London
Attendance: 99,801
Referee: Ron Campbell
Player of the Match: Brett Kenny

FB	1	Shaun Edwards
RW	2	John Ferguson
RC	3	David Stephenson
LC	4	Steve Donlan
LW	5	Henderson Gill
SO	6	Brett Kenny
SH	7	Mike Ford
PR	8	Neil Courtney
HK	9	Nicky Kiss
PR	10	Brian Case
SR	11	Graeme West (c)
SR	12	Brian Dunn
LF	13	Ian Potter
Substitutions:
IC	14	Nick Du Toit
IC	15	Danny Campbell
Coach:
Colin Clarke; Alan McInnes

FB	1	Gary Kemble
RW	2	Kevin James
RC	3	Steve Evans
LC	4	James Leuluai
LW	5	Dane O'Hara
SO	6	Fred Ah Kuoi
SH	7	Peter Sterling
PR	8	Lee Crooks (c)
HK	9	Shaun Patrick
PR	10	Neil Puckering
SR	11	John Muggleton
SR	12	Paul Rose
LF	13	Steve Norton
Substitutions:
IC	14	Gary Divorty
IC	15	Garry Schofield
Coach:
Arthur Bunting
