= Paul Medley =

GB international rugby league footballer

Personal information
- Full name: Paul Richard Medley
- Born: 21 September 1966 (age 60) Leeds, West Riding of Yorkshire, England

Playing information
- Position: Second-row, Loose forward
Club
Years	Team	Pld	T	G	FG	P
1984–89	Leeds	102	44	0	0	176
1989	Halifax	7	1	0	0	4
1989–98	Bradford Bulls	264	98	0	0	392
1999	Dewsbury Rams	27	5	0	0	20
	Total	400	148	0	0	592
Representative
Years	Team	Pld	T	G	FG	P
1986–89	Yorkshire	2	1	0	0	4
1987	Great Britain U21	2	1	0	0	4
1987–88	Great Britain	4	2	0	0	8

Paul Medley (born 21 September 1966) is an English former professional rugby league footballer who played in the 1980s and 1990s. He played at representative level for Great Britain, and at club level for Leeds, Halifax, Bradford Northern/Bradford Bulls and Dewsbury Rams, as a second-row, or loose forward.

== Playing career ==
=== Leeds ===
Medley signed for Leeds from the club's Colts team in 1984. He made his first team debut in January 1985 against Workington Town.

Medley played at second-row in Leeds' 14–15 defeat by St. Helens in the 1987–88 John Player Special Trophy Final during the 1987–88 season at Central Park, Wigan on Saturday 9 January 1988.

Medley appeared as a substitute (replacing second-row Mark Brooke-Cowden) and scored a try in Leeds' 33–12 victory over Castleford in the 1988 Yorkshire Cup Final during the 1988–89 season at Elland Road, Leeds on Sunday 16 October 1988.

In January 1989, Medley was sold to Halifax as part of an exchange deal for Paul Dixon.

=== Bradford ===
Following Halifax's relegation from the First Division at the end of the 1988–89 season, Medley was signed by Bradford Northern for a club record fee of £110,000.

Medley appeared as a substitute (replacing prop Jon Hamer) in Bradford Northern's 20–14 victory over Featherstone Rovers in the 1989 Yorkshire Cup Final during the 1989–90 season at Headingley, Leeds on Sunday 5 November 1989.

Medley played second-row in Bradford Northern's 2–12 defeat by Warrington in the 1990–91 Regal Trophy Final during the 1990–91 season at Headingley, Leeds on Saturday 12 January 1991.

Medley played second-row in 8–15 defeat by Wigan in the 1992–93 Regal Trophy Final during the 1992–93 season at Elland Road, Leeds on Saturday 23 January 1993.

He appeared for Bradford Bulls from the bench in their 1996 Challenge Cup Final defeat by St Helens.

He played 385 games and scored 149 tries in a career that lasted 15 years. He was one of the key players of the Bradford Bulls for 10 years.

Medley played one final season with Dewsbury Rams, helping them reach the 1999 Northern Ford Premiership Grand Final before announcing his retirement.

=== Representative career ===
Medley was selected for the 1988 Great Britain Lions tour.

== Post-playing career ==
After retiring as a player, Medley returned to Bradford Bulls, and worked in a number of different roles at the club, including player performance manager and being head of the club's youth academy. He left the club in 2014 to become the national player development manager for the Rugby Football League.
