= Steve Robinson (rugby league) =

Australian rugby league footballer

Personal information
- Full name: Steven Wayne Robinson
- Born: 4 March 1965 (age 61) Penrith, New South Wales, Australia

Playing information
- Position: Five-eighth, Centre, Halfback, Fullback
Club
Years	Team	Pld	T	G	FG	P
1983–85	Penrith	38	7	0	0	28
1983–84	Castleford	20	5	0	0	15
1986–90	St George	62	7	0	0	28
1991–92	Eastern Suburbs	16	0	0	0	0
	Total	136	19	0	0	71
Representative
Years	Team	Pld	T	G	FG	P
1988	President's XIII	1	0	0	0	0
- Source: Whiticker/Hudson, RLP

Steve Robinson (born 4 March 1965) is an Australian former rugby league footballer who played in the 1980s and 1990s. A utility back whose primary position was five-eighth, he could also play as a fullback, centre or halfback.

== Career ==
=== Club career ===
Robinson was from Penrith, New South Wales, and played 38 games in three seasons with the Penrith Panthers between 1983 and 1985, before moving to the St George Dragons for five seasons between 1986 and 1990.

Robinson was a member of St. George Dragons team that won the 1988 Panasonic Cup, scoring a try in the Cup Final.

He finished his Australian career at Eastern Suburbs for two seasons between 1991 and 1992.

He also played for English club Castleford during the 1983–84 season.

=== Representative career ===
In 1988, Robinson was selected on the bench for a President's XIII that played the touring Great Britain Lions at the Seiffert Oval in Canberra. In wet and muddy conditions, the President's XIII defeated the tourists 24–16.
