= Ewan McGrady =

Australian rugby league footballer

Personal information
- Full name: Ewan McGrady
- Born: 6 July 1964 (age 62) Moree, New South Wales, Australia

Playing information
- Position: Halfback, Five-eighth, Fullback
Club
Years	Team	Pld	T	G	FG	P
1990–93	Canterbury Bulldogs	60	31	5	2	136
1994	Western Suburbs Magpies	4	1	0	0	4
	Total	64	32	5	2	140
Representative
Years	Team	Pld	T	G	FG	P
1991–92	NSW Country	2	0	0	0	0
- Source: As of 16 October 2019

Ewan McGrady (born 6 July 1964) is an Australian former professional rugby league footballer who played in the 1990s. He played for the Canterbury-Bankstown Bulldogs, and the Western Suburbs Magpies.

== Background ==
Ewan McGrady was born in Moree, New South Wales, Australia of Aboriginal and Irish descent.

== Playing career ==
During the 1988 Great Britain Lions tour McGrady played at halfback for Northern Division, scoring two tries in his team's 36–12 win over the Lions. McGrady made his first grade debut for Canterbury-Bankstown against Eastern Suburbs in round 6 1990 at the Townsville Sports Reserve. McGrady finished the 1990 season as the club's top try scorer.

In the 1991 season McGrady was widely regarded as the best player in the New South Wales Rugby League premiership, winning the Rothmans Medal. McGrady was a reluctant winner of the medal as it was reported that he did not want to attend the presentation. He kept organisers and guests waiting for more than an hour before arriving at Sydney's Hilton Hotel with a police escort to accept the award. McGrady's acceptance speech was only eight seconds long with McGrady saying "I'd just like to thank Rothmans and the Canterbury-Bankstown rugby league club for a great year. Thanks a lot,". For a second consecutive season, McGrady finished as the club's top try scorer. and was also named Rugby League Week's player of the year.

McGrady left Canterbury-Bankstown at the end of the 1993 season and joined Western Suburbs for 1994. McGrady only made 4 appearances for Western Suburbs and departed the club and never played first grade rugby league again.
