= Henderson Gill =

Great Britain & England international rugby league footballer

Personal information
- Full name: Henderson Gill
- Born: 16 January 1961 (age 65) Huddersfield, West Riding of Yorkshire, England

Playing information
- Position: Wing
Club
Years	Team	Pld	T	G	FG	P
1978–80	Bradford Northern	14	7	0	0	21
1980–81	Rochdale Hornets	31	18	0	0	54
1981–89	Wigan	220+6	145	106	0	762
1985	South Sydney	8	4	0	0	16
1989–92	Bradford Northern	28+5	15	1	0	62
1991 (loan)	→ Bramley	6	0	0	0	0
	Total	318	189	107	0	915
Representative
Years	Team	Pld	T	G	FG	P
1981	England	1	1	0	0	3
1981–88	Great Britain	15	9	2	0	37
1986–88	Yorkshire	3	3	0	0	12

Henderson Gill (born 16 January 1961) is an English former professional rugby league footballer. He played for Bradford Northern, Wigan and Rochdale Hornets in the Rugby Football League Championship and South Sydney Rabbitohs in the NSWRL competition. Gill primarily played on the wing during his career. He was capped 15 times for Great Britain between 1981 and 1988.

== Background ==
Henderson Gill was born in Huddersfield, West Riding of Yorkshire, England. Gill's parents were originally from Barbados, and moved to England in the 1950s. He attended Royds Hall High School, where he began playing rugby league.

== Career ==
=== Early career ===
Gill made his senior debut for Bradford Northern in September 1978 against Barrow. Gill made only occasional appearances for the first team, as David Barends and David Redfearn were firmly established as the club's first choice wingers. In 1979, Gill suffered a serious knee injury, which further hampered his progress. In 1980, he was sold to Second Division club Rochdale Hornets for a fee of £9,000.

Gill quickly established himself in the first team at Rochdale, scoring 15 tries for the club during the 1980–81 season. His performances caught the attention of Wigan, who signed him in October 1981 for a fee of £30,000.

=== Wigan ===
Gill's first honours for the club came in the 1982–83 season, scoring a try in Wigan's 15–4 victory over Leeds in the 1982–83 John Player Trophy Final at Elland Road, Leeds on Saturday 22 January 1983.

In the following season, he played at Wembley for the first time in the 1983–84 Challenge Cup final, but Wigan lost 6–19 against Widnes.

Gill scored a try in Wigan's 18–26 defeat by St. Helens in the 1984 Lancashire Cup Final during the 1984–85 season at Central Park, Wigan, on Sunday 28 October 1984. He played in his second Challenge Cup final in 1984–85, and this time was on the winning side, scoring a memorable try in the 28–24 victory against Hull.

In June 1985, Gill joined Australian club South Sydney for the remainder of the 1985 NSWRL season, scoring four tries in eight appearances.

Gill played in the 11–8 victory over Hull Kingston Rovers in the 1985–86 John Player Special Trophy Final during the 1985–86 season at Elland Road, Leeds on Saturday 11 January 1986,

Gill played on the wing, and scored 5-conversions in Wigan's 27–6 victory over Oldham in the 1986 Lancashire Cup Final during the 1986–87 season at Knowsley Road, St. Helens, on Sunday 19 October 1986, and scored two tries and a conversion in the 18–4 victory over Warrington in the 1986–87 John Player Special Trophy Final during the 1986–87 season at Burnden Park, Bolton on Saturday 10 January 1987.

Gill played on the wing for Wigan in their 1987 World Club Challenge victory against the visiting Manly-Warringah Sea Eagles, won 8–2 by the home side in a try-less game.

He scored a try in the 28–16 victory Warrington in the 1987 Lancashire Cup Final during the 1987–88 season at Knowsley Road, St. Helens, on Sunday 11 October 1987.

Gill struggled with injuries during his final two seasons at Wigan, and was sold to his former club Bradford Northern in December 1989 for a fee of £30,000. He finished his Wigan career with 145 tries, and was also an occasional goal-kicker for the club, scoring over 100 goals.

=== International honours ===
Gill first international honours came shortly after signing for Wigan in 1981, when he was called up for England as a replacement for John Joyner. He scored a try in the 20–15 win against Wales at Ninian Park in Cardiff.

He also represented Great Britain 15 times between 1981 and 1988, and was selected to go on the 1988 Great Britain Lions tour of Australasia. He scored two tries in a 26–12 win against Australia in the Third Test of the series, with the game being most remembered for Gill's dancing celebration after scoring his second try, described as "a bit of a boogie" by the Australian TV commentator. His last Test was against New Zealand in Christchurch.

== Honours ==
Bradford Northern

- League Championship (1): 1979–80

Wigan

- John Player Trophy (3): 1982–83, 1985–86, 1986–87
- Challenge Cup (2): 1984–85, 1987–88
- League Championship (1): 1986–87
- RFL Lancashire Cup (2): 1986–87, 1987–88
- Premiership (1): 1986–87
- World Club Challenge (1): 1987
