= Gareth Haggerty =

Ireland international rugby league footballer

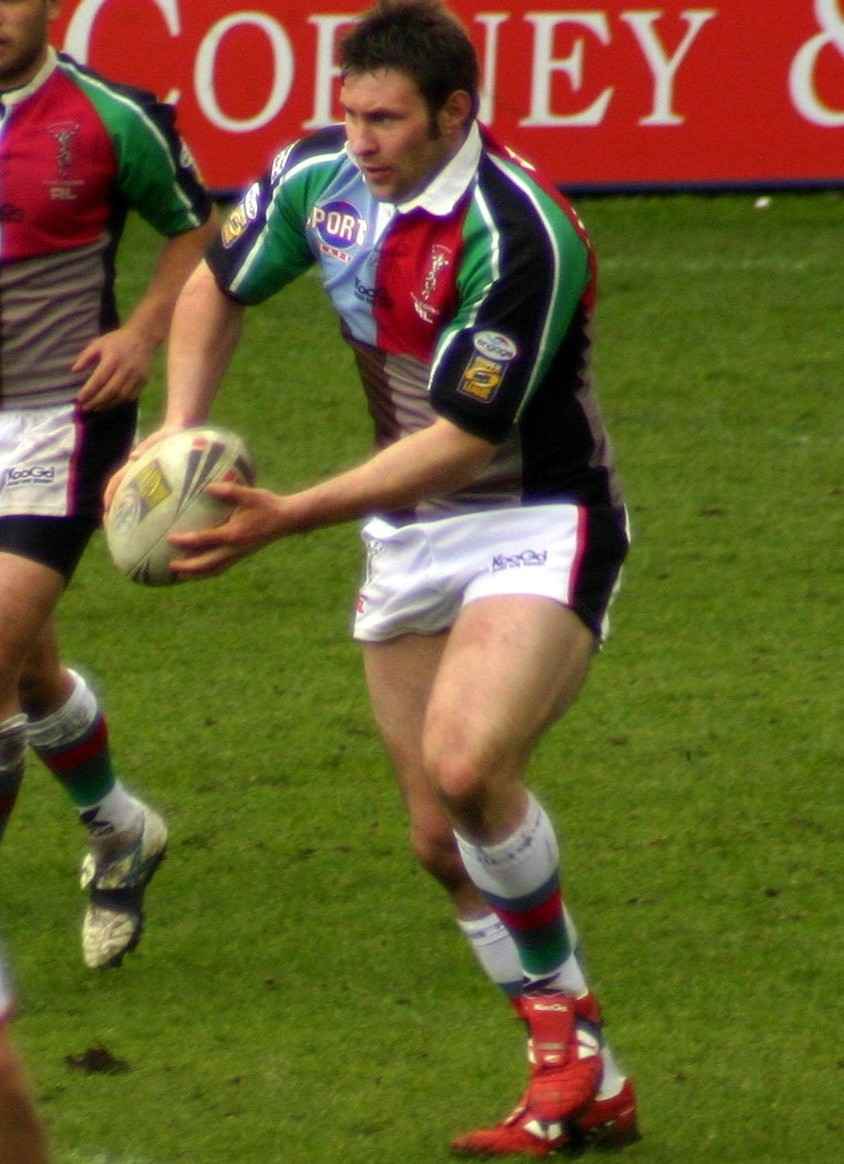

Personal information
- Full name: Gareth Joseph Haggerty
- Born: 8 September 1981 (age 44) St Helens, Merseyside, England

Playing information
- Height: 188 cm (6 ft 2 in)
- Weight: 117 kg (18 st 6 lb)
- Position: Prop, Second-row
Club
Years	Team	Pld	T	G	FG	P
2001–02	Widnes Vikings	4	1	0	0	4
2003–07	Salford City Reds	117	16	0	0	64
2008–09	Harlequins RL	38	7	0	0	28
2010	Widnes Vikings	7	1	0	0	4
Representative
Years	Team	Pld	T	G	FG	P
2006–8	Ireland	6	0	0	0	0
- Father: Roy Haggerty
- Relatives: Kurt Haggerty (brother)

Gareth Haggerty (born 8 September 1981) is a former Ireland international rugby league footballer. He played for the Widnes Vikings in the Co-operative Championship. He previously played for Harlequins RL, St Helens and the Salford City Reds all of whom play in the Super League.

Haggerty's usual position was as a prop. He is a specialist impact player, coming off the interchange bench.

== Background ==
Haggerty was born in St Helens, Merseyside, England.

He is the son of former St. Helens forward Roy Haggerty.

== Career ==
He was a member of the Ireland squad for the 2008 Rugby League World Cup. Although relatively unknown in Australia prior to the tournament, his performances from the bench in the World Cup earned widespread praise from both fans and pundits, with many Australians going as far as to chant 'sign him up' during games.
