= Roy Powell (rugby league, born 1965) =

English rugby league footballer (1965–1998)

Personal information
- Full name: Roy Colin Powell
- Born: 30 April 1965 Dewsbury, England
- Died: 27 December 1998 (aged 33) Rochdale, England

Playing information
- Position: Prop, Second-row
Club
Years	Team	Pld	T	G	FG	P
1983–92	Leeds	228	18	0	0	72
1992–95	Bradford Northern	132	13	1	0	54
1995–97	Featherstone Rovers	61	5	0	0	20
1998	Batley	14	0	0	0	0
1998	Rochdale Hornets	0	0	0	0	0
	Total	435	36	1	0	146
Representative
Years	Team	Pld	T	G	FG	P
1985–91	Great Britain	19	1	0	0	4
1984–85	GB Under 21	5	0	0	0	0
1988	GB tour games	9+1	1	0	0	4
1987–88	Yorkshire	2	0	0	0	0

Roy Colin Powell (30 April 1965 – 27 December 1998) was an English professional rugby league footballer who played in the 1980s and 1990s. He played at representative level for Great Britain and at club level for St John Fisher (in Dewsbury), Leeds, Bradford Northern, Featherstone Rovers, Batley and Rochdale Hornets, as a prop or second-row.

== Background ==
Roy Powell was born in Dewsbury, West Riding of Yorkshire, England, and he died aged 33 in Rochdale, Greater Manchester, England.

== Playing career ==
Powell won caps for Great Britain while at Leeds in 1985 against France (sub), in 1988 against France (2 matches), Australia (sub), Australia (2 matches), and New Zealand, in 1989 against France (2 matches), and New Zealand (2 matches), in 1990 against Papua New Guinea (2 matches), New Zealand (2 matches) (sub), New Zealand, Australia, and Australia (sub), and in 1991 against France (sub). He was selected to go on the 1988 Great Britain Lions tour.

Powell played left-second-row in Leeds' 33–12 victory over Castleford in the 1988 Yorkshire Cup Final during the 1988–89 season at Elland Road, Leeds on Sunday 16 October 1988. Powell played left-second-row in Leeds' 14–15 defeat by St. Helens in the 1987–88 John Player Special Trophy Final during the 1987–88 season at Central Park, Wigan on Saturday 9 January 1988, and played right-prop in Leeds' 8–15 defeat by Wigan in the 1992–93 Regal Trophy Final during the 1992–93 season at Elland Road, Leeds on Saturday 23 January 1993. Powell played in Batley's victory over Oldham in the 1998–99 Trans-Pennine Cup Final during the 1998–99 season.

He collapsed and died of a cardiac arrest at the age of 33, while on his way to take part in a training session for Rochdale Hornets on 27 December 1998.
