= Les Bettinson =

English RL coach and former rugby league footballer (c.1935–2021)

Personal information
- Full name: Leslie James Bettinson
- Born: 1934 or 1935 Millom, Cumberland, England
- Died: 9 September 2021 (aged 86)

Playing information
- Position: Fullback, Centre
Club
Years	Team	Pld	T	G	FG	P
1957–69	Salford	319	75	10		245
Representative
Years	Team	Pld	T	G	FG	P
1957–67	Cumberland	7		0	0	21

Coaching information
Club
Years	Team	Gms	W	D	L	W%
1973–77	Salford

Leslie James Bettinson (c. 1935 – 10 September 2021) was an English professional rugby league footballer, coach and administrator.

Bettinson was born in Millom, Cumberland and declined to sign a contract with Workington Town as a teenager. Five years later, after national service and teacher training, Bettinson was offered a contract by Salford and made his debut against Batley the same day he signed his contract - 9 March 1957. He played 319 games for Salford between 1957 and 1969 including a period as captain. Bettinson appeared for the Cumberland county side on seven occasions between 1957 and 1967 during which Cumberland won the County Championship twice.

After retiring from playing he became the club's assistant coach, later becoming head coach; a post he held between 1973 and 1977. Under his leadership Salford won two championships (1973–74 and 1975–76) and won the BBC2 Floodlit Trophy in 1975–76. After his resignation he joined the board of directors of Salford and remained on the board until 1991.

He would later be team manager for Great Britain during the 1988 tour to Australasia and would publish a book In the Lions' Den: The Rebirth of Great Britain in Rugby League. He was the inaugural President of the Rugby Football League (RFL), and has been chair of the coaching committee.

On 11 September 2021, it was confirmed by the Salford Red Devils club that Bettinson had died aged 86.
