= Hugh Waddell (rugby league) =

GB, England & Scotland international rugby league footballer (1958–2019)

Personal information
- Born: 13 November 1958 Irvine, North Ayrshire, Scotland
- Died: 1 November 2019 (aged 60)

Playing information
- Position: Prop, Second-row
Club
Years	Team	Pld	T	G	FG	P
1983–87	Blackpool Borough	104	18	5	0	82
1987–88	Oldham	54	7	0	0	28
1988–90	Leeds	53	2	0	0	8
1989	Manly Sea Eagles	12	1	0	0	4
1990–92	Sheffield Eagles	83	6	0	0	24
1993	Swinton Lions	8	0	0	0	0
1993	Wakefield Trinity	5	0	0	0	0
1993	Rochdale Hornets	3	0	0	0	0
1994–95	Carlisle	41	13	0	0	52
1996	South Wales RLFC	15	1	0	0	4
1997–98	Barrow	19	2	1	0	10
	Total	397	50	6	0	212
Representative
Years	Team	Pld	T	G	FG	P
1984	England	1	0	0	0	0
1995	Scotland	4	1	0	0	4
1988–89	Great Britain	5	0	0	0	0

Coaching information
Club
Years	Team	Gms	W	D	L	W%
1994	Carlisle RLFC	0	0	0	0

Hugh Waddell (13 November 1958 – 1 November 2019) was a Scottish professional rugby league footballer who played in the 1980s and 1990s as a prop or second-row. He played at representative level for Great Britain, England and Scotland, and at club level for Blackpool Borough, Oldham, Leeds, Manly-Warringah Sea Eagles, Sheffield Eagles, Swinton Lions, Wakefield Trinity, Rochdale Hornets, Carlisle, South Wales, and Barrow.

Waddell died on 1 November 2019, at the age of 60.

== Background ==
Hugh Waddell was born on 13 November 1958 in Irvine, Ayrshire in Scotland. During his childhood, he moved south with his family to Rolleston on Dove, a village near Burton upon Trent, Staffordshire in England. Waddell initially played football, and had trials with Leicester City before switching to rugby union to play for Burton RFC.

== Rugby league career ==
=== Club career ===
In 1980, Waddell had trials with rugby league club Keighley, but was not offered a contract. In 1983, while on holiday in Blackpool, he asked for a trial at Blackpool Borough, and subsequently accepted an offer to sign for the club.

In January 1987, Waddell was signed by Oldham for a fee of £15,000.

Waddell joined Leeds in September 1988. He played in Leeds' 33–12 victory over Castleford in the 1988 Yorkshire Cup Final during the 1988–89 season at Elland Road, Leeds on Sunday 16 October 1988.

Waddell joined Sheffield Eagles in 1990, and went on to play for Swinton, Wakefield Trinity and Rochdale Hornets. In 1994, he joined Carlisle. He was briefly appointed as player-coach at the club following the departure of Cameron Bell, but was replaced as coach a few months later by Paul Charlton. He played for South Wales RLFC in 1996 before finishing his professional career with Barrow.

=== Representative career ===
Waddell made his international debut in 1984 while at Blackpool Borough, making his first (and only) appearance for England against Wales.

He debuted for Great Britain while at Oldham in 1988, playing in two matches against France. He was selected for the 1988 Great Britain Lions tour later that year, and was the only player from a Second Division club to be chosen in the squad. He played in two Test matches during the tour; the 26–12 victory against Australia in the 3rd Ashes Test, and the 10–12 defeat against New Zealand. He made one further appearance for Great Britain while at Leeds in 1989 against France.

Waddell also made four appearances for the newly-formed Scotland national team in 1995, including playing all three games for the team at the 1995 Emerging Nations Tournament.
