= Paul Hulme =

Great Britain international rugby league footballer

Personal information
- Full name: Paul Hulme
- Born: 19 April 1966 (age 60) Widnes, Cheshire, England

Playing information
- Position: Hooker, Second-row
Club
Years	Team	Pld	T	G	FG	P
1982–96	Widnes
1996–97	Warrington Wolves	28	3	0	0	12
1998	Swinton Lions	19	1	0	0	4
1999	Widnes Vikings	20	3	0	0	12
	Total	67	7	0	0	28
Representative
Years	Team	Pld	T	G	FG	P
1988–92	Great Britain	8	0	0	0	0
1988–89	Lancashire	2	0	0	0	0
- Relatives: David Hulme (brother)

Paul Hulme (born 19 April 1966) is a former professional rugby league footballer who played in the 1980s and 1990s. He played at representative level for Great Britain, and at club level for the Widnes Vikings (two spells), Warrington Wolves (captain) and Swinton Lions as a hooker, or second-row.

== Playing career ==
=== International honours ===
While at Widnes Hulme was selected to go on the 1988 Great Britain Lions tour. He won caps for Great Britain in against Australia (two matches), and New Zealand. He was also selected to go on the 1992 Great Britain Lions tour of Australia and New Zealand, playing against New Zealand (two matches), and in 1992 against Australia (two matches), and New Zealand.

=== World Club Challenge appearances ===
Paul Hulme played right-second-row in Widnes' 30-18 victory over Canberra Raiders in the 1989 World Club Challenge at Old Trafford, Manchester on Wednesday 4 October 1989.

=== John Player Special/Regal Trophy final appearances ===
Paul Hulme appeared as a substitute (replacing second-row Emosi Koloto) in Widnes' 6-12 defeat by Wigan in the 1988–89 John Player Special Trophy Final during the 1988–89 season at Burnden Park, Bolton on Saturday 7 January 1989, and played hooker in the 24-0 victory over Leeds in the 1991–92 Regal Trophy Final during the 1991–92 season at Central Park, Wigan on Saturday 11 January 1992.

=== Testimonial match ===
Paul Hulme's Testimonial match at Widnes took place in 1993.

== Genealogical information ==
Paul Hulme is the younger brother of the rugby league footballer, David Hulme, and is the uncle of the rugby league footballer for Widnes Vikings, and Toulouse Olympique Danny Hulme. Two of Paul Hulme's sons also currently play rugby league; Liam Hulme played for Warrington Wolves and Swinton Lions, and his youngest son Lewis Hulme plays for Widnes Vikings.
