= Roy Haggerty =

GB international rugby league footballer

Personal information
- Born: 22 March 1960; Thatto Heath, Lancashire, England
- Died: 22 April 2018 (aged 58)

Playing information
- Position: Centre, Second-row
Club
Years	Team	Pld	T	G	FG	P
1979–91	St Helens	363	115	0	20	443
1991–93	Barrow	28	1	0	0	4
1992(loan)	→ Huddersfield	4	1	0	0	4
1993(loan)	→ Highfield	3	0	0	0	0
	Total	398	117	0	20	451
Representative
Years	Team	Pld	T	G	FG	P
1986	Lancashire	1	0	0	0	0
1987	Great Britain	2	0	0	0	0
- Relatives: Gareth Haggerty (son); Kurt Haggerty (son)

Roy Haggerty (22 March 1960 – 22 April 2018) was an English professional rugby league footballer who played in the 1970s, 1980s and 1990s. He played for St Helens, Barrow and Highfield who began his career playing as a centre before later playing as a second-row forward.

Capped twice for Great Britain Haggerty was selected to go on the 1988 Great Britain Lions tour of Australasia but did not play in any Test matches. He also appeared once for Lancashire in a game against Yorkshire.

Two of his sons Gareth Haggerty and Kurt Haggerty are also professional rugby league footballers.

== Playing career ==
=== St Helens ===
Born in Thatto Heath, Haggerty played for local amateur side Pilkington Recs before he signed for St Helens as a teenager. He made his first team début playing centre in a 31–20 defeat by Widnes in the John Player Trophy on 30 September 1979.

The first of his 115 tries for St Helens came on 9 October against Rochdale Hornets.

A constant presence in the St Helens side for 12 seasons, Haggerty made 363 appearances scoring 115 tries and kicking 20 drop goals. Among these appearances were two appearances in the final of the Lancashire Cup; the first a 16–0 defeat by Warrington in the 1982 competition, and the second in the 28–16 victory over Wigan in the 1984 final.

In the early part of his career Haggerty played as a centre, but in 1984 St Helens signed Mal Meninga, considered at the time the best centre in the world. When told of the move Haggerty reportedly said "where are they going to play him?", the answer was in Haggerty's place in the centres and Haggerty was moved into the forwards to play at Second-row where he played for the rest of his career.

In the same season, 1984–85, Heggarty played in the Premiership final as St Helens beat Hull Kingston Rovers 36–16.

Another final appearance was in the 1987–88 John Player Special Trophy final where St Helens beat Leeds 15–14.

He made two appearances in the final of the Challenge Cup, both on the losing side. The first was in the 1987 final at Wembley Stadium, London on Saturday 2 May 1987, a losing appearance as Halifax won the cup 19–18. The second was in the 27–0 defeat by Wigan at Wembley on 29 April 1989.

After a testimonial season in 1990, Haggerty left St Helens in 1991.

=== Post St Helens ===
After leaving St Helens, Haggerty played for two seasons for Barrow before joining Highfield in 1993. After a short spell with Highfield and another with Huddersfield, Haggerty retired at the end of the 1992–93 season.

Haggerty died from a blocked artery caused by coronary heart disease on 22 April 2018, aged 58.

== International career ==
In 1987 Haggerty was selected to play for Great Britain in two test matches against France, he did not score in either game but Great Britain won both matches. Haggerty was selected for the 1988 Great Britain tour to Papua New Guinea, Australia and New Zealand and while he played in some of the representative matches he did not play in any of the test matches.
