= Darren Wright (rugby) =

Great Britain rugby league footballer (born 1968)

Personal information
- Born: 17 January 1968 (age 57); Leigh, England

Playing information

Rugby league
- Position: Wing, Centre
Club
| Years | Team | Pld | T | G | FG | P |
|---|---|---|---|---|---|---|
| 1985–96 | Widnes | 345 | 107 | 0 | 0 | 428 |
| 1990 | North Sydney | 2 | 0 | 0 | 0 | 0 |
| | Total | 347 | 107 | 0 | 0 | 428 |
Representative
| Years | Team | Pld | T | G | FG | P |
| 1987 | Lancashire | 1 | 0 | 0 | 0 | 0 |
| 1987–88 | Great Britain U-21 | 2 | 1 | 0 | 0 | 4 |
| 1988 | Great Britain | 1 | 0 | 0 | 0 | 0 |

Rugby union
Club
| Years | Team | Pld | T | G | FG | P |
|---|---|---|---|---|---|---|
| 1996–97 | Sale |
| 1997–99 | Orrell |
| | Total | 0 | 0 | 0 | 0 | 0 |

Darren Wright (born 17 January 1968) is an English professional rugby league and rugby union footballer who played as a wing or centre. He spent most of playing career with rugby league club Widnes, scoring over 100 tries for the club between 1985 and 1996, and also played briefly for Australian club North Sydney. He played at representative level for Great Britain, winning one cap during the 1988 Lions tour. In 1996, he switched to rugby union, playing for Sale and Orrell.

== Background ==
Darren Wright was born in Leigh, Lancashire, England. A former Leigh Miners Welfare amateur, Wright was signed by Widnes in March 1985.

== Rugby league career ==
=== Club career ===
Wright made his debut for Widnes as a substitute in December 1985 in a league match against York.

Wright played centre, and scored a try in Widnes' 6–12 defeat by Wigan in the 1988–89 John Player Special Trophy Final during the 1988–89 season at Burnden Park, Bolton on Saturday 7 January 1989.

During the 1989–90 Rugby Football League season, he played for defending champions Widnes at centre in their 1989 World Club Challenge victory against the visiting Canberra Raiders.

Wright played for North Sydney during the 1990 NSWRL season.

Wright played on the wing in Widnes' 24–18 victory over Salford in the 1990 Lancashire Cup Final during the 1990–91 season at Central Park, Wigan on Saturday 29 September 1990.

During the 1991–92 season, Wright played at centre in the 24–0 victory over Leeds in the 1991–92 Regal Trophy Final at Central Park, Wigan on 11 January 1992.

Darren Wright's Testimonial match at Widnes took place in 1995.

=== Representative career ===
Wright was called up for the 1988 Great Britain Lions tour as a replacement for the injured Shaun Edwards. He came on a substitute in the second test match against Australia on 28 June 1988. This was Wright's only cap for the senior Great Britain side.

== Rugby union career ==
In July 1996, Wright joined rugby union club Sale, along with fellow Widnes teammates John Devereux and Adrian Hadley. After one season at the club, he moved to Orrell.
