= Michael McKiernan =

Australian rugby league footballer

Personal information
- Full name: Michael McKiernan
- Born: 17 May 1963 (age 61)

Playing information
- Position: Second-row, Loose forward
Club
| Years | Team | Pld | T | G | FG | P |
|---|---|---|---|---|---|---|
| 1988–89 | Newcastle Knights | 34 | 1 | 19 | 0 | 42 |
- Source: As of 5 February 2019

Michael McKiernan is a former professional rugby league footballer who played in the 1980s. He was part of the inaugural Newcastle Knights squad from 1988 to 1989.

== Background ==
McKiernan played with Lakes United before signing with Newcastle in 1988.

== Playing career ==
McKiernan made his first grade debut for Newcastle in Round 1 1988 against Parramatta which ended in a 28–4 defeat. McKiernan scored his one and only try for Newcastle against Brisbane in Round 6 1988. McKiernan played on with Newcastle in 1989 and his final game in first grade was a 20–2 loss against Western Suburbs at Campbelltown Stadium in Round 16 1989.
