= Tony Townsend =

Australian rugby league footballer

Personal information
- Full name: Tony Townsend
- Born: April 7, 1961 Sydney, New South Wales, Australia
- Died: 23 August 2022 (aged 61) Maitland, New South Wales, Australia

Playing information
- Position: Hooker
Club
Years	Team	Pld	T	G	FG	P
1985–87	St George Dragons	13	1	0	0	4
1988–90	Newcastle Knights	25	2	0	0	8
	Total	38	3	0	0	12
- Source: As of 24 August 2022

Tony Townsend (7 April 1961 – 23 August 2022) was a professional rugby league footballer who played in the 1980s and 1990s. He played for the St. George Dragons from 1985 to 1987 and then he was part of the inaugural Newcastle Knights squad from 1988 to 1990.

== Playing career ==
Townsend made his first grade debut for St George in Round 13 1985 against North Sydney at North Sydney Oval. Townsend played 7 games for St George that season as the club won the minor premiership. Townsend did not for the club in any of its finals games or the grand final loss against Canterbury-Bankstown.

In 1988, Townsend signed with Newcastle and played in the club's first ever game against Parramatta. Townsend played for Newcastle up until the end of the 1990 season before retiring.

== Death ==
Townsend died on 23 August 2022, at the age of 61.
