= Stuart Evans =

Wales international rugby union & league footballer

- Born: Stuart Evans; 14 June 1963 (age 63) Neath, Wales
- Height: 6 ft 1 in (1.85 m)
- Weight: 17 st 7 lb (111 kg)
- School: Dumbarton House School

Rugby union career
- Position: Prop
Senior career
Years	Team	Apps	(Points)
–	British Steel		
–	Resolven RFC		
1982–86	Swansea RFC	74	(20)
1986–87	Neath RFC		
–	Western Suburbs		
1995	FC Grenoble	1	(0)
1996–97	Swansea RFC	14	(0)
International career
Years	Team	Apps	(Points)
1985–87	Wales	9	(4)
1986	Barbarian F.C.	1	(4)
- Rugby league career

Playing information
- Position: Prop
Club
Years	Team	Pld	T	G	FG	P
1987–91	St. Helens	80	5			20

Stuart Evans (born 14 June 1963) is a Welsh former rugby union and rugby league player who played from the 1980s up until the early 2000s.

Evans also took up a career in coaching the game after he retired from his long and successful professional playing career, having coached up till 2019.

== Playing career ==
=== Rugby union ===
Born in Neath in June 1963, Evans played for several rugby union clubs, including British Steel, for whom he once worked, Resolven, Swansea, Western Suburbs, Neath and Barbarian F.C. Between 1985 and 1987, Evans played for the Wales national rugby union team on nine occasions, and played in the 1987 Rugby World Cup.

=== Rugby league ===
In September 1987, Evans switched codes to rugby league, joining St Helens.

Evans appeared as a substitute (replacing Prop Peter Souto) in St Helens' 15–14 victory over Leeds in the 1987–88 John Player Special Trophy Final during the 1987–88 season at Central Park, Wigan on Saturday 9 January 1988. He also came on as a substitute in St Helen's 0–27 defeat against Wigan in the 1988–89 Challenge Cup final at Wembley Stadium.

=== Return to rugby union ===
After leaving St Helens, Evans spent several years attempting to return to rugby union. The governing bodies at the time placed a lifetime ban on anyone who had played professional rugby league, but Evans took the case to court to have the ban overturned. He was eventually re-instated in 1995, but ruptured his achilles tendon in his first appearance for French club FC Grenoble.

== Honours ==
- Welsh Club Champions:

Winners (1): 1986–87 (Neath RFC)

- League Cup

Winners (1): 1987–88 (St. Helens)

- Challenge Cup

Runners-up (2): 1988–89, 1990–91 (St. Helens)

- WRU Challenge Cup

Runners-up (1): 1996–97 (Swansea RFC)
