= Steve O'Brien =

Australian rugby league footballer

Personal information
- Born: 20 June 1965 (age 59); Sydney, New South Wales

Playing information
- Position: Wing
Club
Years	Team	Pld	T	G	FG	P
1984–88	Canterbury-Bankstown	55	21	0	0	84
1989–92	Balmain Tigers	58	16	0	0	64
	Total	113	37	0	0	148

Steve O'Brien (born 20 June 1965) is an Australian former professional rugby league footballer who played for the Canterbury-Bankstown Bulldogs and the Balmain Tigers in the NSWRL competition in the 1980s and 1990s.

== Early life ==
O'Brien played his junior rugby league for the Moorebank Rams and Liverpool City.

== Playing career ==
O'Brien made his first grade debut in the 1984 season against South Sydney and played on the wing in Canterbury's 6-4 victory over Parramatta in the 1984 grand final. O'Brien was not a part of Canterbury's 1985 premiership winning team but played in the 1986 4-2 loss to Parramatta in a tryless grand final. In 1988, O'Brien played in two finals games for Canterbury but was not included in the victorious grand final side which defeated Balmain. In 1989, O'Brien joined Balmain and played in the 1989 grand final against the Canberra Raiders which is regarded as one of the best grand finals of all time. O'Brien retired at the end of the 1992 season.
