= Troy Clarke (rugby league) =

Australian rugby league footballer

Personal information
- Full name: Troy Clarke
- Born: 19 April 1967 (age 59) Newcastle, New South Wales, Australia

Playing information
- Position: Wing, Centre
Club
Years	Team	Pld	T	G	FG	P
1988–89	Newcastle Knights	7	0	1	0	2
1992	Canterbury-Bankstown	9	5	2	0	24
1993–94	Leigh	30	7	30	0	88
	Total	46	12	33	0	114
- Source: As of 16 January 2019

Troy Clarke is an Australian former rugby league footballer who played in the 1980s and 1990s. He played for the Newcastle Knights from 1988 to 1989 and the Canterbury Bulldogs in 1992. Clarke then moved to England and played 2 seasons for Leigh.

== Playing career ==
Clarke was an inaugural player for Newcastle and made his debut for the club in 1988 against defending premiers Manly-Warringah which ended in a 44–12 defeat. In 1992, Clarke joined Canterbury-Bankstown playing 1 season for the club. In 1993, Clarke joined English side Leigh and played 2 seasons at the club before retiring at the end of 1994.
