= Les Quirk =

English rugby league footballer

Personal information
- Full name: Leslie Quirk
- Born: 6 March 1965 (age 60); Ulverston, Lancashire, England

Playing information
- Position: Wing
Club
Years	Team	Pld	T	G	FG	P
1983–87	Barrow	105	63	0	0	248
1987–94	St. Helens	160	98	0	0	392
1994–99	Whitehaven	110	55	0	0	220
	Total	375	216	0	0	860
Representative
Years	Team	Pld	T	G	FG	P
1988–91	Cumbria	3	0	0	0	0

Leslie Quirk (born 6 March 1965) is an English former professional rugby league footballer who played in the 1980s and 1990s. He played at club level for Barrow, St. Helens and Whitehaven, as a wing.

== Playing career ==
Born in Ulverston, Quirk started his amateur career at Dalton, and made his professional début for Barrow in 1983. In 1987, he joined St. Helens for a fee of £55,000.

Quirk played in St Helens' 15–14 victory over Leeds in the 1987–88 John Player Special Trophy Final during the 1987–88 season at Central Park, Wigan on Saturday 9 January 1988. He also played in two Challenge Cup finals at Wembley for Saints in 1989 and 1991, but was on the losing side on both occasions.

Quirk also represented Cumbria, playing in an 18–13 victory over France in October 1988, and a 34–12 victory over Papua New Guinea in November 1991.
