= Paul Loughlin =

GB international rugby league footballer

Personal information
- Full name: Paul John Loughlin
- Born: 28 July 1966 (age 60) St Helens, Merseyside, England

Playing information
- Position: Fullback, Centre
Club
Years	Team	Pld	T	G	FG	P
1984–95	St Helens	297	80	842	0	2004
1995–97	Bradford Bulls	64	28	13	0	138
1998–99	Huddersfield Giants	38	5	4	0	28
2000–01	Swinton Lions	29	11	2	0	48
	Total	428	124	861	0	2218
Representative
Years	Team	Pld	T	G	FG	P
1988–89	Lancashire	2	0	3	0	6
1988–92	Great Britain	15	2	31	0	70

Paul John Loughlin (born 28 July 1966) is an English former rugby league centre who played for his hometown team St Helens, the Bradford Bulls, the Huddersfield Giants and the Swinton Lions.

Loughlin was born in St. Helens, Lancashire, England. He made his first team début for St. Helens against Oldham aged 17 in 1984. He went on to score over 2,000 points for the club, and holds the club record for most points scored in a game - 2 tries and 16 goals for a total of 40 points in a 112–0 victory over Carlisle during September 1986. In 1995, he was transferred to the Bradford Bulls as part of the record breaking deal to bring Paul Newlove to Knowsley Road.

Loughlin was also a regular selection for Great Britain. He was selected to go on the 1988 Great Britain Lions tour.

Loughlin played right-centre scored 2-tries and kicked 3 goals, and was man of the match in St. Helens' 15-14 victory over Leeds Rhinos in the 1987–88 John Player Special Trophy Final during the 1987–88 season at Central Park, Wigan on Saturday 9 January 1988.

After his move to Bradford Bulls, he enjoyed several successful seasons with the Bradford Bulls. He played for the Bradford Bulls at centre in their 1996 Challenge Cup Final defeat by St. Helens. Loughlin then played a prominent role in the Bradford Bulls winning the Super League title in 1997. After spending two further seasons in the Super League with the Huddersfield Giants, he ended his career with the Swinton Lions.

Loughlin appeared in a total of five Challenge Cup Finals, three times for St. Helens, and twice for the Bradford Bulls, and was a member of the losing side on each of these occasions.

Loughlin is now head coach of amateur rugby league team Garswood Stags ARLFC who have gained promotion to Northwest Men's League Division 4.
