= Brett Shore =

Australian rugby league footballer

Personal information
- Full name: Brett Shore

Playing information
- Position: Prop
Club
Years	Team	Pld	T	G	FG	P
1988	Newcastle Knights	11	0	0	0	0
- Source: As of 5 February 2019

Brett Shore is a former professional rugby league footballer who played in the 1980s. He played for the Newcastle Knights in 1988.

== Playing career ==
Shore was part of the Newcastle Knights inaugural year. He played 11 matches for the Knights before being released at the end of 1988 to pursue other interests. A knee reconstruction midway through 1988 ended career.
