= Glenn Miller (rugby league) =

Australian rugby league footballer (born 1964)

Personal information
- Full name: Glenn Miller
- Born: 10 February 1964 (age 62)

Playing information
- Position: Centre, Wing
Club
Years	Team	Pld	T	G	FG	P
1986–87	Penrith Panthers	4	0	0	0	0
1988–92	Newcastle Knights	84	11	0	0	44
	Total	88	11	0	0	44
- Source: As of 5 February 2019

Glenn Miller is a former professional rugby league footballer who played in the 1980s and 1990s. He played for the Penrith Panthers from 1986 to 1987 and he was part of the inaugural Newcastle Knights squad from 1988 to 1992.

== Playing career ==
Miller made his first grade debut for Penrith in Round 5 1986 against South Sydney. In 1988, Miller signed with Newcastle and played in the club's first ever game which was against Parramatta and ended in a 28–4 defeat.

In 1992, Miller played in Newcastle's first ever finals campaign as the club finished 4th. Miller played in both matches, the 21–2 victory over Western Suburbs and the 3–2 loss to St George. The defeat by St George in turn was Miller's last game in first grade and he retired at the end of 1992.

== Post playing ==
Miller worked as a plumber and also was a trade teacher in the plumbing Department at Maitland TAFE, Newcastle N.S.W.
