= Paul Forber =

British rugby league footballer

Personal information
- Born: 29 April 1964 (age 61) St Helens, England

Playing information
- Position: Second-row, Prop
Club
Years	Team	Pld	T	G	FG	P
1982–93	St Helens	248	50	7	1	215
1993–98	Salford	146	33	0	0	132
1999	Workington Town	22	4	0	0	16
2000	Rochdale Hornets	2	0	0	0	0
	Total	418	87	7	1	363
Representative
Years	Team	Pld	T	G	FG	P
1985	Lancashire	1	0	0	0	0

Paul Forber (born 29 April 1964) is an English former rugby league footballer who played as a second-row or prop in the 1980s and 1990s. He spent most of his career with St Helens, making almost 250 appearances in 11 seasons at the club. He also spent several seasons with Salford before finishing his career with Workington Town and Rochdale Hornets.

== Playing career ==
Forber started his professional rugby league career with St Helens, signing for the club in May 1981. He made his first team debut a year later against Australia during the 1982 Kangaroo tour. He established a regular place in the first team during the 1984–85 season, and played for the club in the 1985 Premiership final, appearing as a substitute in the 36–16 win against Hull Kingston Rovers.

The following season, he represented Lancashire in a "War of the Roses" match against Yorkshire. He was a non-playing substitute in the 1987 Challenge Cup final defeat against Halifax.

He played at second-row in the 1987–88 John Player Special Trophy victory over Leeds. He also played in the 1989 Challenge Cup final, but was again on the losing side, this time against Wigan.

Forber missed most of the 1990–91 season due to injury, but returned the following season to help Saints win the 1991–92 Lancashire Cup against Rochdale Hornets.

In January 1993, Forber was signed by Salford for a fee of £25,000. He was released at the end of the 1998 season, and joined Workington Town.

In 2023, Forber was inducted into the St Helens Hall of Fame.
