= David Hulme (rugby league) =

GB international rugby league footballer and coach (born 1964)

Personal information
- Born: 6 February 1964 (age 62) Widnes, Cheshire, England

Playing information
- Position: Stand-off, Scrum-half
Club
Years	Team	Pld	T	G	FG	P
1980–96	Widnes	447	156	0	1	607
1996	Leeds	9	2	0	0	8
1997–99	Salford City Reds	67	8	0	0	32
2000–01	Widnes Vikings	18	3	0	0	12
	Total	541	169	0	1	659
Representative
Years	Team	Pld	T	G	FG	P
1987–88	Lancashire	2	0	0	0	0
1988–89	Great Britain	8	1	0	0	4

Coaching information
Club
Years	Team	Gms	W	D	L	W%
2000–01	Widnes RLFC	0	0	0	0
- Relatives: Paul Hulme (brother)

David Hulme (born 6 February 1964) is an English former professional rugby league footballer who played in the 1980s and 1990s. He played at representative level for Great Britain, and at club level for Widnes, the Leeds Rhinos and the Salford City Reds, as a stand-off, or scrum-half.

== Early life ==
Having started his playing career at St Bede's RC Junior School, David moved to St Joseph's RC Comprehensive in Widnes (where he played Centre for their RU team) whilst continuing playing Amateur Rugby League for Halton Hornets in a set up that also produced future Widnes team mates Barry Dowd (1982–93) and Andy Currier.

His first taste of the "limelight" was in the Widnes Under-11 team that won the "Curtain raiser" to the 1975 Challenge Cup Final, when Widnes played Warrington, and won the "Main Event" 14–7.

== Playing career ==
=== Widnes ===
Hulme played as a substitute in Widnes' 19–6 victory over Wigan in the 1984 Challenge Cup Final during the 1983–84 season at Wembley Stadium, London on Saturday 5 May 1984, in front of a crowd of 80,116.

Hulme played, and was man of the match winning the Harry Sunderland Trophy in Widnes' 38-14 victory over St. Helens in the Premiership Final during the 1987–88 season at Old Trafford on Sunday 15 May 1988. Hulme played scrum-half, and was man of the match in Widnes' 30–18 victory over Canberra Raiders in the 1989 World Club Challenge at Old Trafford, Manchester on Wednesday 4 October 1989. Hulme played scrum-half in Widnes' 24-18 victory over Salford in the 1990 Lancashire Cup Final during the 1990–91 season at Central Park, Wigan on Saturday 29 September 1990. Hulme played scrum-half in Widnes' 6-12 defeat by Wigan in the 1988–89 John Player Special Trophy Final during the 1988–89 season at Burnden Park, Bolton on Saturday 7 January 1989. Hulme's Testimonial match at Widnes took place in 1991.

=== Leeds ===
Hulme joined Leeds in 1996, making nine appearances and scoring two tries for the club in Super League I.

=== International honours ===
Hulme won caps for Great Britain while at Widnes in 1988 against Papua New Guinea, Australia (3 matches), and New Zealand, and in 1989 against New Zealand (3 matches). Hulme was selected to go on the 1988 Great Britain Lions tour.

== Genealogical information ==
Hulme is the older brother of the rugby league footballer, Paul Hulme, and is the father of the rugby league footballer Danny Hulme who scored the fastest hat trick of tries for Widnes Vikings against Halifax in 2011.
