= Ian Wilkinson (rugby league) =

GB international rugby league footballer

Personal information
- Born: 3 September 1960 (age 64); Hemsworth, Wakefield, England

Playing information
- Position: Fullback, Centre
Club
Years	Team	Pld	T	G	FG	P
1980–87	Leeds	158	46	3	0	165
1987–89	Halifax	35	14	0	0	56
1989–92	Bradford Northern	87	13	0	0	52
	Total	280	73	3	0	273
Representative
Years	Team	Pld	T	G	FG	P
1986–87	Yorkshire	2	0	0	0	0

Ian Wilkinson (born 3 September 1960) is an English former professional rugby league footballer who played in the 1980s and 1990s. He played at representative level for Great Britain (non-Test matches), and Yorkshire, and at club level for Leeds, Halifax and Bradford Northern, as a fullback, or centre.

== Background ==
Wilkinson was born in Hemsworth, Wakefield, West Riding of Yorkshire, England.

== Playing career ==
=== Leeds ===
Wilkinson played at centre in Leeds' 4–15 defeat by Wigan in the 1982–83 John Player Trophy Final during the 1982–83 season at Elland Road, Leeds on Saturday 22 January 1983, and played fullback in the 18–10 victory over Widnes in the 1983–84 John Player Special Trophy Final during the 1983–84 season at Central Park, Wigan on Saturday 14 January 1984.

=== Halifax ===
Wilkinson played at centre in Halifax's 12–32 defeat by Wigan in the 1987–88 Challenge Cup Final during the 1987–88 season at Wembley Stadium, London on Saturday 30 April 1988.

=== Bradford Northern ===
In December 1988, Wilkinson was signed by Bradford Northern for a fee of £30,000. He played fullback in Bradford Northern's 20–14 victory over Featherstone Rovers in the 1989–90 Yorkshire Cup Final during the 1989–90 season at Headingley, Leeds on Sunday 5 November 1989.
