= Ellery Hanley =

GB & England international rugby league footballer and coach

Ellery Hanley MBE
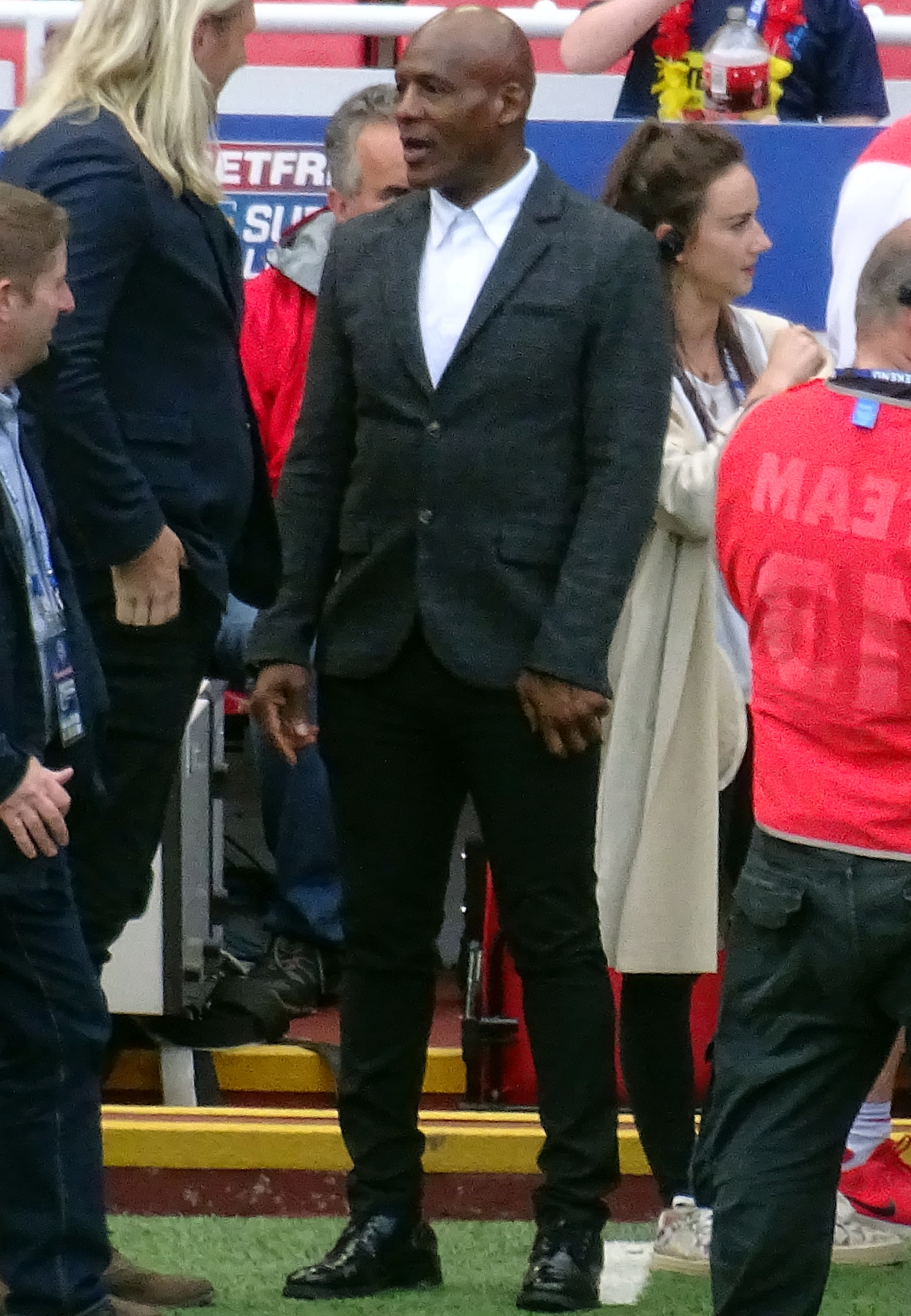

Personal information
- Full name: Cuthwyn Ellery Hanley
- Born: 27 March 1961 (age 65) Leeds, West Riding of Yorkshire, England

Playing information
- Position: Stand-off, Loose forward, Centre, Wing
Club
| Years | Team | Pld | T | G | FG | P |
|---|---|---|---|---|---|---|
| 1978–85 | Bradford Northern | 126 | 89 | 0 | 0 | 356 |
| 1985–91 | Wigan | 202 | 189 | 0 | 0 | 756 |
| 1988 | Balmain Tigers | 8 | 5 | 0 | 0 | 20 |
| 1989 | Western Suburbs | 13 | 4 | 0 | 0 | 16 |
| 1991–95 | Leeds | 114 | 106 | 0 | 0 | 424 |
| 1996–97 | Balmain Tigers | 26 | 3 | 0 | 1 | 13 |
| | Total | 489 | 396 | 0 | 1 | 1585 |
Representative
| Years | Team | Pld | T | G | FG | P |
| 1984–92 | England | 2 | 2 | 0 | 0 | 8 |
| 1984–93 | Great Britain | 36 | 20 | 0 | 0 | 80 |
| 1985–91 | Yorkshire | 5 | 4 | 0 | 1 | 17 |

Coaching information
Club
| Years | Team | Gms | W | D | L | W% |
| 1999–00 | St. Helens | 40 | 28 | 0 | 12 | 70 |
| 2008 | Doncaster | 35 | 23 | 0 | 12 | 66 |
| | Total | 75 | 51 | 0 | 24 | 68 |
Representative
| Years | Team | Gms | W | D | L | W% |
| 1994 | Great Britain | 3 | 1 | 0 | 2 | 33 |
| 2022 | Combined Nations | 1 | 0 | 0 | 1 | 0 |
- Relatives: Umyla Hanley (son)

Cuthwyn Ellery Hanley (born 27 March 1961) is an English former rugby league footballer and coach. Over a nineteen-year professional career (1978–1997), he played for Bradford Northern, Wigan, Balmain, Western Suburbs and Leeds. He won 36 caps for Great Britain, captaining the team from 1988 to 1992, and two for England. Nicknamed 'Mr Magic' and 'The Black Pearl', he played most often as a stand-off or loose forward after starting out as a centre or wing.

Hanley won the Man of Steel Award a record three times, the Lance Todd Trophy once and the Golden Boot in 1988. He was awarded the MBE in January 1990 for services to the game. In 2005 he was inducted into the Rugby Football League Hall of Fame.

After his playing career he had spells as head coach of Great Britain, St Helens and Doncaster.

== Early life ==
Born in Leeds, West Riding of Yorkshire, England, Hanley grew up in Potternewton, near Chapeltown. He attended Foxwood School in Seacroft, Leeds. His parents originated from Saint Kitts. He is the father of Umyla Hanley, who currently plays in Super League for the Leigh Leopards.

== Club career ==
=== Bradford Northern ===
In 1978, Hanley signed for Bradford Northern from the junior club Corpus Christi. On 26 November 1978, he made his professional début for Northern against Rochdale Hornets in a League Division One match. He helped his club to a 30–18 victory, by scoring a try on his début. He established a regular place in the first team in 1981–82, scoring 15 tries in his first full season. In the following season, he reached the semi-final of the 1983 Challenge Cup against Featherstone Rovers. Although Bradford ultimately lost the match, Hanley scored a memorable try which was selected as the try of the season in the BBC's Top Try competition.

In 1984–85, his last season with the club, Hanley became the first man to score more than 50 tries in a season since Alf Ellaby, and the first non-winger to reach this figure for 70 years. He scored a remarkable 55 tries in only 37 appearances, an achievement made even more remarkable as he switched between the positions of wing, centre and stand-off. For his achievements in the 1984–85 season, he was awarded the Man of Steel award, which is awarded to the player judged to have made the biggest impact in the season, as well as the First Division Player of the Year.

In total, Hanley made 126 appearances for the club, scoring 89 tries.

=== Wigan ===
In 1985 he signed for Wigan for a fee of £150,000, with Steve Donlan and Phil Ford moving to Bradford Northern in exchange for Hanley as part of the deal. Hanley finished his first season for the club with 35 tries.

During his second season at Wigan he scored 63 tries playing at centre, stand-off and loose forward, an all-time record for a non-winger. In the 1987 season, Hanley was awarded the Man of Steel award, being voted the player who made the biggest impact during the season. His play that year helped Wigan to their first league title in 27 years. He played in Wigan's 1987 World Club Challenge victory against the visiting Manly-Warringah Sea Eagles. Hanley holds the record for the most tries in a Regal Trophy (or precursors) Final with 3 tries.

In 1988, Hanley was in dispute with Wigan and was stripped of the captaincy. He was transfer listed at a then record £350,000. But when Wigan reached the semi-final of the 1988 Rugby League Challenge Cup against Salford, coach Graham Lowe recalled Hanley to the team. Upon his return Hanley scored a magnificent try in the final at Wembley Stadium. Ironically it was set up by Joe Lydon – reminiscent of the two tries he scored against Wigan four years earlier. Ray French stated it was the second greatest ever seen in a final.

In 1989, Hanley helped the club reach the Challenge Cup Final, where they won a 27–0 victory over St Helens in front of a crowd of approximately 78,000 people at Wembley, the first time in Cup Final history at Wembley that a side had been held scoreless. He was awarded the Lance Todd Trophy for the man of the match. For his performances throughout the season he was also awarded the Man of Steel award for the second time as a Wigan player, and the third time in his overall career. 1989 was also the year in which Hanley was awarded the Adidas Golden Boot, which was awarded to the world's most outstanding player. Hanley remembers that "It was something I always strove for. I wanted to be the best player in the world… Looking back, to be the world's best player at that time was the biggest honour of my career."

He led Wigan to another two League and Cup doubles. By 1991 though his relationship with the media reached an all-time low. Although both Wigan and Great Britain captain, he was not expected to carry out any media role.

In total he spent around five years with the club, making 202 appearances and scoring 189 tries. In his Wigan career, he won a World Club Championship, 4 Challenge Cup winners medals, 3 Championships, 1 Premiership, 4 John Player Trophy Winners medals and 4 Lancashire Cup winners medals. He was also voted Man of Steel twice as a Wigan player. Hanley was inducted into the Wigan Hall of Fame in 2007.

=== Balmain (1988) ===
Hanley, the Great Britain captain, was signed by Sydney club Balmain Tigers to play the remaining rounds of the 1988 NSWRFL season for them once his representative commitments were fulfilled. In his first season with the club he helped them to the Grand Final in 1988 against Canterbury by defeating Penrith, Manly, Canberra as well as Cronulla in the preliminary finals. The preliminary final against Cronulla was a closely fought battle, until Hanley went to set up the try that would seal the victory for Balmain as they edged out their opponents 9–2, the win sending the club to their first Grand Final since 1969.

The first half of the Grand Final was a tight contest as Balmain led 6–4 scoring due to a mistake from Canterbury fullback Jason Alchin. In the 26th minute, Hanley was wrapped up low by Andrew Farrar, and as he want to offload the ball, Terry Lamb hit Hanley with a high tackle that went unnoticed by the referee. He hit the ground in an awkward position and was concussed. He played no further part in the match, and his side went on to lose the game 24–12. Lamb said he was only looking to wrap the ball up and there was no intention. Lamb commented in his 1992 book that Balmain had key players such as Wayne Pearce, Ben Elias, Paul Sironen and Garry Jack that there was no chance to target one individual.

Speaking to Inside Sport Magazine in August 2005, Hanley was asked:

What do you remember about that infamous tackle by Terry Lamb?

"I don't know if it was caused by Terry Lamb, or if it was just my head hitting the ground. I couldn't tell you because I have never looked at it since. Some people have said Terry got a good shot on me. I suspect, however, it was more a case of my head hitting the ground. I like to think it was accidental. Afterwards, I was concussed and didn't know where I was. I didn't regain all my faculties immediately so, from a safety point of view, I had to come off the football field. It was a shame, but it is a physical game and sometimes things like that happen."

Have you spoken to Lamb since then?

"No, I never have. I have never bumped into him. I have to say I respect him as a footballer. I don't know him as a person, but by all accounts he is a good guy. Let me be clear that I have no malice towards him, none at all, regardless of the incident being deliberate or accidental."

The New South Wales Rugby League, despite the media pressure, backed up Lamb's version of events and deemed he had no case to answer.

=== Western Suburbs ===
In 1989, Hanley moved from Balmain to Western Suburbs. He played a total of thirteen games, scoring four tries for a total of sixteen points in his one and only season for the club. 1989 was also the year in which Hanley was awarded the Adidas Rugby League World Golden Boot Award, which was awarded to the world's most outstanding player.

=== Leeds ===
In September 1991 at the age of 30, he joined Leeds as a player and coach for £250,000, and on his arrival at the club, was immediately appointed captain.

The 1993–94 season saw Hanley play in the Challenge Cup Final for the first time with Leeds. In the previous game, the Challenge Cup semi-final, Leeds faced St Helens at Central Park. Hanley scored two tries to put the club back on the big stage for the first time in sixteen years. In the Final, the club's opponents were Hanley's former club Wigan. In front of an official attendance at Wembley of 78,348, Leeds were defeated 16–26 by Wigan.

In the 1994–95 season, Hanley set a new world record for a forward, scoring 41 tries in a season. During that season, Hanley helped the club reach the Challenge Cup Final at Wembley for the second consecutive year. Ironically it was the same opponent that they faced a year earlier in the same competition final. In front of an attendance of 78,550 they were defeated, just as they had been a year earlier by their opponents, this time going down 30–10.

=== Balmain (1996–97) ===
In 1996 and well past his prime, Hanley returned to the Australian club Balmain for his second spell with the club. Hanley stated that "I wanted to be respected by the Australians as well, because their game is so superior to ours."

== Representative career ==
Hanley won caps for England while at Bradford Northern in 1984 against Wales, while at Leeds in 1992 against Wales.

He made his Great Britain début as a substitute, whilst still a Bradford Northern player, in January 1984 against France in Avignon. He was selected for the 1984 Great Britain Lions tour to Australia and was one of the stars of the 1984 Ashes series, scoring a remarkable twelve tries playing mostly on the wing.

Hanley was then selected as captain for the 1988 Great Britain Lions tour. The Lions defeated Papua New Guinea but lost The Ashes to Australia, losing the first two Tests in Sydney and Brisbane. The Third Test was a triumph for Hanley and his Lions though as they defeated Australia for the first time in a Test match since 1978, ending Australia's streak of 15 straight wins over Great Britain. The Lions then defeated New Zealand 12–10 in Christchurch for their only test in NZ to finish the tour on a high note. Hanley scored eight tries in total on the tour.

Internationally, 1990 was a disappointment. Hanley captained Great Britain against the 1990 Kangaroos, and although they pulled off a shock 19–12 win over Australia in the first test at Wembley with Hanley playing a prominent role, the Kangaroos would come back to win the second and third tests to extend their Ashes series streak over the Lions which dated back to 1973.

Hanley also toured Australia in 1992 for the Ashes series, but despite being captain of the squad, on the field he made only one appearance and played less than fifteen minutes in a minor tour match against Newcastle. He played in Great Britain's defeat by Australia in the 1992 Rugby League World Cup final at Wembley.

Hanley retired from international rugby in 1993. In total, he was capped 36 times by Great Britain.

== Coaching career ==
In 1994, following Mal Reilly's decision to step down as both Great Britain and Halifax coach to become coach of Australian club the Newcastle Knights, Hanley was appointed coach of the Great Britain Lions during the Ashes series against Australia during the 1994 Kangaroo tour of Great Britain and France. His appointment meant he had become the first black person to coach or manage a major national team in Great Britain. After a 12-man Lions team pulled off a gutsy 8–4 win in the first test at Wembley (following the first half send-off of captain Shaun Edwards for a high tackle), they lost the series when Australia won the second test 34–8 at Old Trafford, and 23–4 at Elland Road in Leeds.

The 1994 Ashes series would prove to be Hanley's only time as Great Britain coach. For the 1995 Rugby League World Cup held in England and Wales, Great Britain was not playing, with England and Wales competing instead. Also, Hanley had signed with the Australian Rugby League during the Super League war which began in 1995 while the RFL were aligned with the Super League.

In 1999, he was appointed as the coach of St. Helens as the successor to Shaun McRae. In his first season as coach, he led St. Helens to the 1999 Super League Grand Final. His side defeated the Bradford Bulls, the club he began his professional playing career at, by 8–6 in October of that year. Whilst he harboured a strong desire to win, he could appear aloof and had several acrimonious disagreements with the St. Helens board of directors, which led to his suspension and eventual sacking as the manager of St Helens in 2000. Ian Millward was appointed as his successor.

He switched to rugby union coaching and took up posts with Bristol Rugby, and in the England national set-up. He also got involved in the sport of squash before returning to rugby league as a coaching consultant with Castleford Tigers in 2004. He worked with Cas for just two months before leaving.

On 14 December 2007 Hanley was unveiled as the coach of National League Two Club Doncaster. He resigned from that role on 28 September 2008, following Doncaster's successful promotion play-off campaign.

In a return to coaching after a 14-year gap, Hanley was named, in March 2022 as head coach of the Combined Nations All Stars for their 2022 match against England.

== Recognition ==
In January 1990 he was honoured with an MBE by the Queen for his services to rugby league. In October 2005, he was inducted into the Rugby Football League Hall of Fame. He is widely considered to be one of the greatest players in rugby league history.

=== Honours ===
- Man of Steel: 1985, 1987, 1989
- Golden Boot Award: 1988
- Lance Todd Trophy: 1989
- Rugby League Hall of Fame: 2005

== Outside rugby league ==
Whilst playing for Wigan, Hanley had a try out in the World League of American Football with the London Monarchs in March 1991. It was reported that Hanley would play for the team, but this never materialised.

In 2009, Hanley was one of thirteen celebrities taking part in Dancing on Ice, partnered with Frankie Poultney. He was the sixth person to be eliminated from the show.

== Sources ==
Achievements
| Preceded by George Fairbairn | Rugby league transfer record Bradford Northern to Wigan; 1985–1986 | Succeeded by Joe Lydon |
| Preceded by Graham Steadman | Rugby league transfer record Wigan to Leeds; 1991–1992 | Succeeded by Martin Offiah |
