= Steve Fulmer =

Australian rugby league footballer (born 1966)

Personal information
- Born: May 6, 1966 (age 60) Australia

Playing information
Club
Years	Team	Pld	T	G	FG	P
1988–1991	Newcastle Knights

Steve Fulmer (born 6 May 1966) is an Australian former professional rugby league footballer who played in the 1980s and 1990s. He played for the Newcastle Knights from 1988 to 1991.
