= Graeme Bradley =

Australian rugby league footballer

Personal information
- Born: 20 March 1964 (age 62) Oatley, New South Wales, Australia

Playing information
- Position: Centre
Club
Years	Team	Pld	T	G	FG	P
1985–87	Illawarra Steelers	27	6	0	0	24
1988–91	Penrith Panthers	73	16	0	0	64
1991–92	Castleford Tigers	33	4	0	0	16
1993–95	St. George Dragons	70	13	0	0	52
1996–98	Bradford Bulls	83	38	0	0	152
	Total	286	77	0	0	308
Representative
Years	Team	Pld	T	G	FG	P
1988	Prime Minister's XIII	1	1	0	0	4

Graeme Bradley (born 20 March 1964) is an Australian former professional rugby league footballer who played in the 1980s and 1990s.

== Playing career ==
He played for the Illawarra Steelers, Penrith Panthers and the St. George Dragons in the New South Wales Rugby League premiership (NSWRL) as well as the Castleford Tigers and Bradford Bulls in England.

Bradley played junior football with Oatley RSL, New South Wales. Bradley entered first-grade after Illawarra Steelers' coach, Brian Smith, signed him to the club in 1985. Smith had been Bradley's school-teacher. He spent three years with the Steelers before moving to the Penrith Panthers.

The Panthers reached back-to-back grand finals, in 1990 and 1991. Bradley was named on the bench for the 1991 grand final and although he spent 40 minutes warming up on the sidelines, coach Phil Gould did not send Bradley on. Following the grand final victory, he travelled with the Panthers to England for the 1991 World Club Challenge, which was lost to Wigan. After this, he followed his former Steelers Smith to the St George Dragons. Bradley played in the grand final for St George in 1993.

Bradley played at second-row in Castleford's 12–28 defeat by Wigan in the 1992 Challenge Cup Final during the 1991–92 season at Wembley Stadium, London, in front of a crowd of 77,386.

When Smith left Australia to coach the Bradford Bulls in the newly formed Super League, he signed Bradley, who spent three successful years there, including an appearance at stand-off half in Bradford’s 1996 Challenge Cup Final loss to St. Helens, and winning Super League II in 1997. Bradley retired following 1998's Super League III.
