= Paul Groves (rugby league) =

GB rugby league footballer (born 1965)

Personal information
- Born: 27 May 1965 (age 60)

Playing information
- Position: Hooker
Club
Years	Team	Pld	T	G	FG	P
1983–87	Salford	102	15	0	0	60
1987–92	St. Helens	158	29	0	1	117
1992–93	Oldham	6	2	0	0	8
	Total	266	46	0	1	185
Representative
Years	Team	Pld	T	G	FG	P
1987	Lancashire	1	0	0	0	0
1987	Great Britain	1	0	0	0	0

Paul Groves (born 27 May 1965) is a former professional rugby league footballer who played in the 1980s and 1990s. He played at representative level for Great Britain and Lancashire, and at club level for Salford, St Helens and Oldham, as a hooker.

== Playing career ==
=== St Helens ===
In October 1987, Groves signed for St Helens from Salford for a fee of £40,000. He played hooker in St Helens' 15–14 victory over Leeds in the 1987–88 John Player Special Trophy Final during the 1987–88 season at Central Park, Wigan on 9 January 1988.

Groves played hooker in St Helens' 24–14 victory over Rochdale Hornets in the 1991 Lancashire Cup Final during the 1991–92 season at Wilderspool Stadium, Warrington, on 20 October 1991.

=== International honours ===
Groves won a cap for Great Britain while at St Helens in 1987 against Papua New Guinea. He was selected to go on the 1988 Great Britain Lions tour of Australasia but didn't play in any Test matches.
