= Steve Walters (rugby league, born 1967) =

Australian rugby league footballer

Personal information
- Full name: Steve Walters
- Born: 10 May 1967 (age 59) Newcastle, New South Wales, Australia
- Height: 174 cm (5 ft 9 in)
- Weight: 78 kg (12 st 4 lb)

Playing information
- Position: Halfback, Centre, Five-eighth
Club
Years	Team	Pld	T	G	FG	P
1988–91	Newcastle Knights	23	3	0	0	12
- Source: As of 5 February 2019

Steve Walters (born 10 May 1967) is a former professional rugby league footballer who played in the 1980s and 1990s. He was part of the inaugural Newcastle Knights squad in 1988. Walters is not to be confused with former representative rugby league footballer Steve Walters who played with the Canberra Raiders and shares the same name.

== Background ==
Walters played for Lakes United before signing with Newcastle Knights.

== Playing career ==
Walters made his first grade debut for Newcastle in Round 1 1988 against Parramatta Eels which ended in a 28–4 defeat. The following week, Walters played in Newcastle's first win as a new club defeating Western Suburbs 20–16.

Walters played with Newcastle for another 3 seasons and his final game in first grade was a 26–12 loss against Penrith Panthers in Round 17 1991.
