= Glen Frendo =

Australian rugby league footballer

Glenn Frendo
Personal information
- Full name: Glenn Frendo
- Born: 24 August 1964 (age 61)

Playing information
- Position: Wing, Fullback
Club
Years	Team	Pld	T	G	FG	P
1986–87	Canterbury-Bankstown	12	3	0	0	12
1988–90	Newcastle Knights	47	2	0	0	8
	Total	59	5	0	0	20
- Source: As of 5 February 2019

Glenn Frendo is a former professional rugby league footballer who played in the 1980s and early 1990s. He played for the Canterbury-Bankstown Bulldogs from 1986 to 1987 and he was part of the inaugural Newcastle Knights squad from 1988 to 1990.

== Background ==
Frendo played his junior rugby league for Bankstown Sports before being graded by Canterbury.

== Playing career ==
Frendo made his first grade debut for Canterbury against Penrith in Round 17 1986. Frendo made 7 appearances for the club that season but did not feature in the finals series or the grand final loss against Parramatta.

In 1988, Frendo signed with Newcastle and played in the club's first ever game, a 28–4 loss against Parramatta. Frendo played 3 seasons with Newcastle and his last game for the club was a 20–6 loss against Penrith in Round 19 1990.
