= 1986–87 Rugby League Premiership =

1986–87 Premiership
- Structure: National knockout championship
- Winners: Wigan
- Runners-up: Warrington

The 1987 Rugby League Premiership was the 13th end of season Rugby League Premiership competition.

The winners were Wigan.

== First round ==
| Date | Team One | Team Two | Score |
|---|---|---|---|
| 26 April 1987 | Castleford | Halifax | 6-18 |
| 26 April 1987 | St Helens | Bradford Northern | 46-14 |
| 26 April 1987 | Warrington | Hull Kingston Rovers | 24-12 |
| 26 April 1987 | Wigan | Widnes | 22-18 |

== Semi-finals ==
| Date | Team One | Team Two | Score |
|---|---|---|---|
| 10 May 1987 | Wigan | Halifax | 18-10 |
| 10 May 1987 | St Helens | Warrington | 8-18 |

== Final ==
17 May 1987

| Wigan | 8-0 | Warrington |
|---|---|---|
| G-Gill, Stephenson; T-Lydon |

Old Trafford
Attendance: 38,756
Referee: Kevin Allatt
Player of the Match: Joe Lydon

| 1 | Steve Hampson |
| 2 | Henderson Gill |
| 3 | David Stephenson |
| 4 | Dean Bell |
| 5 | Joe Lydon |
| 6 | Shaun Edwards |
| 7 | Andy Gregory |
| 8 | Brian Case |
| 9 | Nicky Kiss |
| 10 | Shaun Wane |
| 11 | Andy Goodway |
| 12 | Ian Potter |
| 13 | Ellery Hanley |
Substitutions:
| 14 | Richard Russell for Joe Lydon |
| 15 | Graeme West for Shaun Wane |
Coach:
Graham Lowe

| 1 | Brian Johnson |
| 2 | Joe Ropati |
| 3 | Barry Peters |
| 4 | Des Drummond |
| 5 | Mark Forster |
| 6 | Ronnie Duane |
| 7 | Paul Bishop |
| 8 | Paul Cullen |
| 9 | Gary Sanderson |
| 10 | Tony Humphries |
| 11 | Bob Jackson |
| 12 | Mark Roberts |
| 13 | Kevin Tamati |
Substitutions:
| 14 | Mike Gregory for Tony Humphries |
| 15 | Bob Eccles for Mark Roberts |
Coach:
Tony Barrow
