= 1985–86 Rugby League Premiership =

1985–86 Premiership
- Structure: National knockout championship
- Winners: Warrington
- Runners-up: Halifax

The 1985–86 Rugby League Premiership was the 12th end of season Rugby League Premiership competition.

The winners were Warrington.

== First round ==
Date	Team one	Team two	Score
26 Apr	Halifax	Hull F.C.	32-20
27 Apr	St Helens	Leeds	22-38
27 Apr	Warrington	Widnes	10-8
27 Apr	Wigan	Hull Kingston Rovers	47-0

== Semi-finals ==
Date	Team one	Team two	Score
11 May	Halifax	Leeds	16-13
11 May	Wigan	Warrington	12-23

== Final ==
18 May 1986

Warrington	38 – 10	Halifax
Tries: Johnson, Forster, Bishop, Boyd (2), Tamati, Jackson; Goals: Bishop (5)		Tries: C. Anderson; Goals: Whitfield (3)

Elland Road
Attendance: 13,683
Referee: Fred Lindop
Player of the Match: Les Boyd

1	Paul Ford
2	Mark Forster
3	Paul Cullen
4	Ronnie Duane
5	Brian Carbert
6	Paul Bishop
7	Andy Gregory
8	Les Boyd
9	Kevin Tamati
10	Bob Jackson
11	Gary Sanderson
12	Mark Roberts
13	Mike Gregory
Substitutions:
14	Brian Johnson for Paul Ford
15	Billy McGinty for Gary Sanderson
Coach:
Tony Barrow

1	Colin Whitfield
2	Eddison "Eddie" Riddlesden
3	Tony Anderson
4	Chris Anderson
5	Scott Wilson
6	John Crossley Jr.
7	Gary Stephens
8	Mick Scott
9	Seamus McCallion
10	Geoff Robinson
11	Brian Juliff
12	Neil James
13	Paul Dixon
Substitutions:
14	Steve Smith for Colin Whitfield
15	Steve Bond for Neil James
Coach:
Chris Anderson
