= 1989–90 Lancashire Cup =

- Structure: Regional knockout championship
- Teams: 17
- Winners: Warrington
- Runners-up: Oldham

The 1989–90 Lancashire Cup was the 77th occasion on which the Lancashire Cup competition had been held. Warrington won the trophy by beating Oldham by the score of 24-16 in the final. The match was played at Knowsley Road, Eccleston, St Helens, Merseyside, (historically in the county of Lancashire). The attendance was 9.990 and receipts were £41,804.

== Background ==
This season, Chorley Borough (see note 1) joined the league, bringing the total number of entrants up to 17.
This necessitated the need for a preliminary round (consisting of just 1 game). The first round (proper) then involved 16 clubs, thus removing the need of any "blank" or "dummy" fixtures or any byes.

== Competition and results ==
=== Preliminary round ===
Involved 1 match and 2 clubs

Game No	Fixture Date	Home team	Score	Away team	Venue	Att	Rec	Notes	Ref
	Wed 30 Aug 1989	Chorley Borough (2)	12-6	Trafford Borough	Victory Park	628		1 2	

=== First round ===
Involved 8 matches (with no byes) and 16 clubs

Game No	Fixture Date	Home team	Score	Away team	Venue	Att	Rec	Notes	Ref
1	Fri 15 Sep 1989	Chorley Borough (2)	4-50	Wigan	Hilton Park	5026		3	
2	Sun 17 Sep 1989	Barrow	2-46	Oldham	Craven Park	2253			
3	Sun 17 Sep 1989	Carlisle	6-46	Widnes	Brunton Park	4329		4	
4	Sun 17 Sep 1989	Leigh	26-8	Whitehaven	Hilton Park	2039			
5	Sun 17 Sep 1989	St. Helens	78-10	Runcorn Highfield	Knowsley Road	5498		5	
6	Sun 17 Sep 1989	Salford	52-12	Rochdale Hornets	The Willows	3094			
7	Sun 17 Sep 1989	Warrington	16-6	Swinton	Wilderspool	4055			
8	Sun 17 Sep 1989	Workington Town	24-30	Fulham	Derwent Park	702			

=== Second round ===
Involved 4 matches and 8 clubs

Game No	Fixture Date	Home team	Score	Away team	Venue	Att	Rec	Notes	Ref
1	Wed 27 Sep 1989	Fulham	4-34	Wigan	Claremont Road	3204		6 7	
2	Wed 27 Sep 1989	Leigh	12-34	Widnes	Hilton Park	6748			
3	Wed 27 Sep 1989	St. Helens	6-36	Oldham	Knowsley Road	7834			
4	Wed 27 Sep 1989	Salford	4-27	Warrington	The Willows	4994			

=== Semi-finals ===
Involved 2 matches and 4 clubs

Game No	Fixture Date	Home team	Score	Away team	Venue	Att	Rec	Notes	Ref
1	Thu 05 Oct 1989	Oldham	19-18	Wigan	Watersheddings	8603			
2	Tue 10 Oct 1989	Warrington	28-6	Widnes	Wilderspool	10240			

=== Final ===
14 October 1989

Warrington	24 – 16	Oldham
Tries: Jackson (2), Ropati, Forster; Goals: Turner (4)		Tries: Irving, Robinson, Lord; Goals: Platt, Hyde

Knowsley Road, St Helens
Attendance: 9,990
Referee: Ray Tennant (Castleford)
Player of the Match: Bob Jackson

==== Teams ====
Warrington	No.	Oldham
	Teams	
David Lyon	1	Duncan Platt
Des Drummond	2	Steve Robinson
Joe Ropati	3	Gary Hyde
Tony Thorniley	4	Richard Irving
Mark Forster	5	Paul Lord
Robert Turner	6	Brett Clark
Greg Mackey	7	Mike Ford
Tony Burke	8	Leo Casey
Mark Roskell	9	Andy Ruane
Steve Molloy	10	John Fieldhouse
Bob Jackson	11	Shaun Allen
Gary Sanderson	12	Keith Newton
Mike Gregory (c)	13	John Cogger (c)
	Subs	
Paul Darbyshire (for David Lyon; 34 mins)	14	Richard Russell (for Duncan Platt; 34 mins)
Ronnie Duane (for Gary Sanderson; 65 mins)	15	John Fairbank (for Leo Casey; 58 mins)
Brian Johnson	Coach	Tony Barrow

=== The road to success ===
First round
Salford	52
Rochdale Hornets	12
Warrington	16
Swinton	6
Leigh	26
Whitehaven	8
Carlisle	6
Widnes	46
St. Helens	78
Runcorn Highfield	10
Barrow	2
Oldham	46
Workington Town	24
Fulham	30
Chorley Borough (2)	4
Wigan	50

Second round
Salford	4
Warrington	27
Leigh	12
Widnes	34
St. Helens	6
Oldham	36
Fulham	4
Wigan	34

Semi-finals
Warrington	28
Widnes	6
Oldham	19
Wigan	18

Final
Warrington	24
Oldham	16

== Notes ==
1 * Chorley Borough (2) were elected to the league during the close season after the previous team of the same name moved out and to Altrincham as Trafford Borough. This was the first Lancashire Cup match played by the newly formed and elected club and also to be played at the new venue, home of Chorley F.C.
2 * The first Lancashire Cup match played by the reformed and newly named Trafford Borough The half time score was 2-6 in favour of Trafford Borough
3 * Match played at Leigh's Hilton Park
4 * Match played at Carlisle United's Brunton Park
5 * This was the 25th successive defeat for Runcorn Highfield
6 * The venue is given by RUGBYLEAGUEproject as Chiswick Poly Sports Grd - Rothmans Rugby League Yearbook 1990–91 gives the venue as Claremont Road stadium which, at that date, was the home ground of Hendon F.C.
7 * The first Lancashire Cup match to be played on this ground, one of many used by Fulham during the nomadic period between 1985 and 1993
8 * Knowsley Road was the home ground of St. Helens from 1890 to 2010. The final capacity was in the region of 18,000, although the actual record attendance was 35,695, set on 26 December 1949, for a league game between St Helens and Wigan

== See also ==
- 1989–90 Rugby Football League season
- Rugby league county cups
