= Warrington Wolves–Wigan Warriors rivalry =

British rugby rivalry

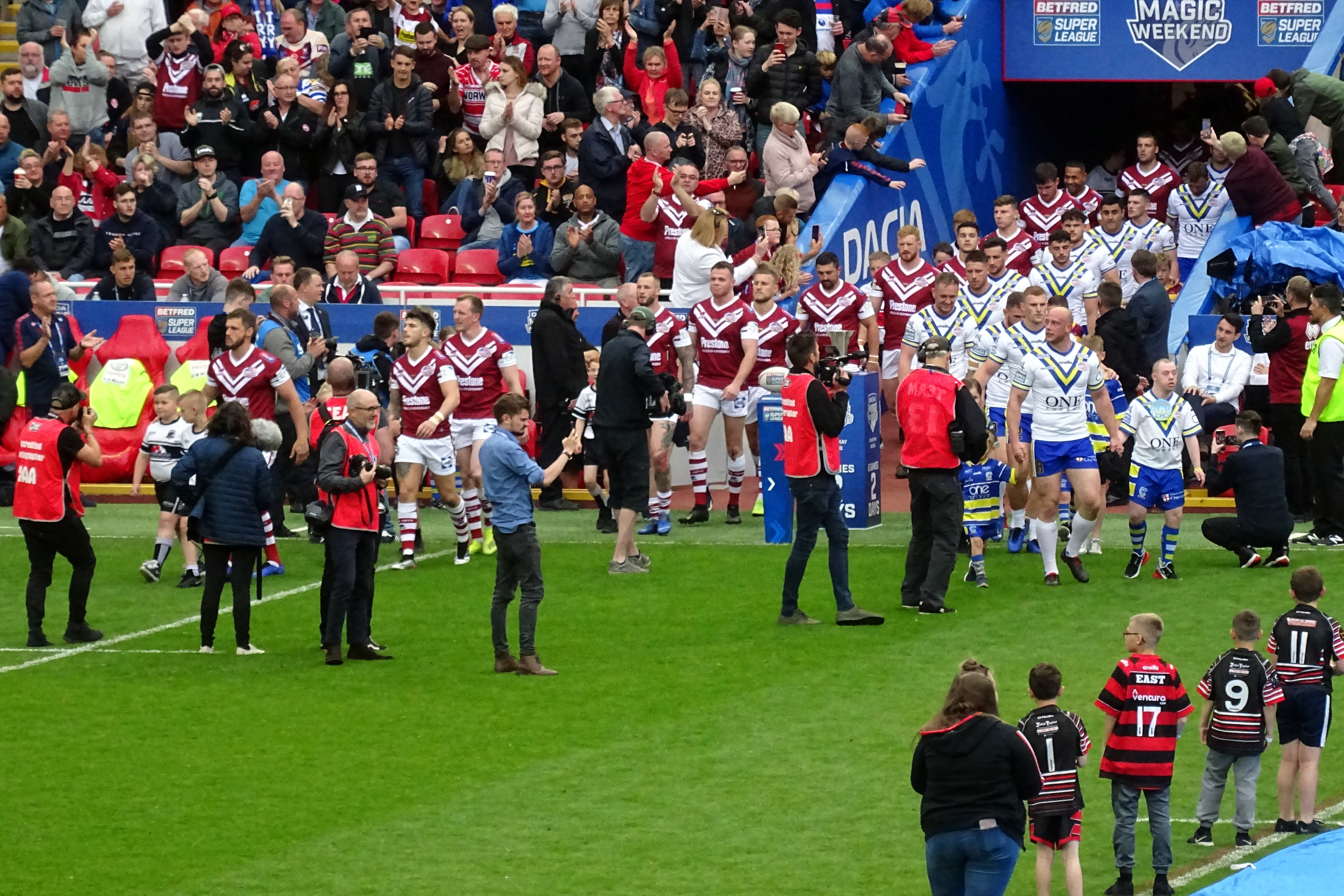
- Warrington and Wigan enter Anfield for Magic Weekend 2019
- Location: Lancashire, England
- Teams: Warrington Wolves; Wigan Warriors
- First meeting: 2 November 1895 (Wigan Warriors 8–0 Warrington Wolves)
- Latest meeting: 10 July 2026 (Wigan Warriors 30-18 Warrington Wolves)
- Next meeting: 2027 (unless the sides meet in the 2026 Super League play-offs)
- Stadiums: Halliwell Jones Stadium; DW Stadium

Statistics
- Total meetings: 329
- Most wins: Wigan Warriors (192)

The Warrington Wolves–Wigan Warriors rivalry is a local rugby league rivalry based in Lancashire, England. The two clubs are some of the most successful in England, and annually compete in the Locker Cup to celebrate their rivalry.

== History ==
Locations of Warrington Wolves and Wigan Warriors.

The competitive history of the two clubs began on 18 January 1873 when the then two-month-old Wigan Warriors played their first match against Warrington Wolves (who would not form an official team for another three years). Both clubs were founding members of the NRFU, and have enjoyed a fierce rivalry throughout their history. Both sides also have other major rivalries, Warrington vs Widnes Vikings and Wigan vs St Helens, which at times has dampened the rivalry between them. However it was Wigan's dominance in during the late 1980s and 90s which caused the largest taming of the rivalry. It was only in 2009 and 2010 following Warrington's back-to-back victory in the Challenge Cup and the club's subsequently establishing themselves as a Super League Top Four Club which saw the rivalry heat up again as both teams started simultaneously competing for top honours. In the decade that followed, the clubs contested three Super League Grand Finals in 2013, 2016, and 2018. The rivalry has said to have been at its peak between 2011 and 2013.

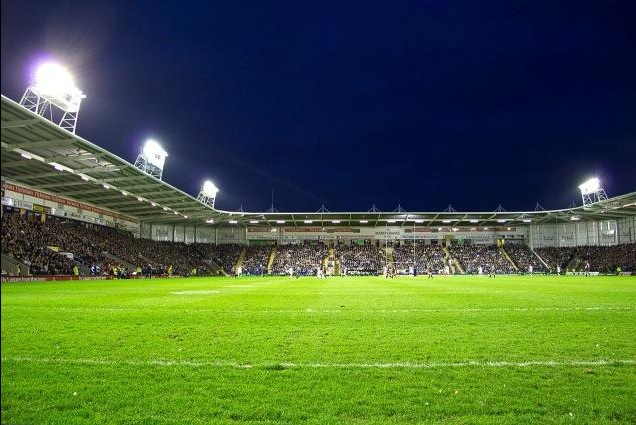
The Halliwell Jones Stadium, home of Warrington

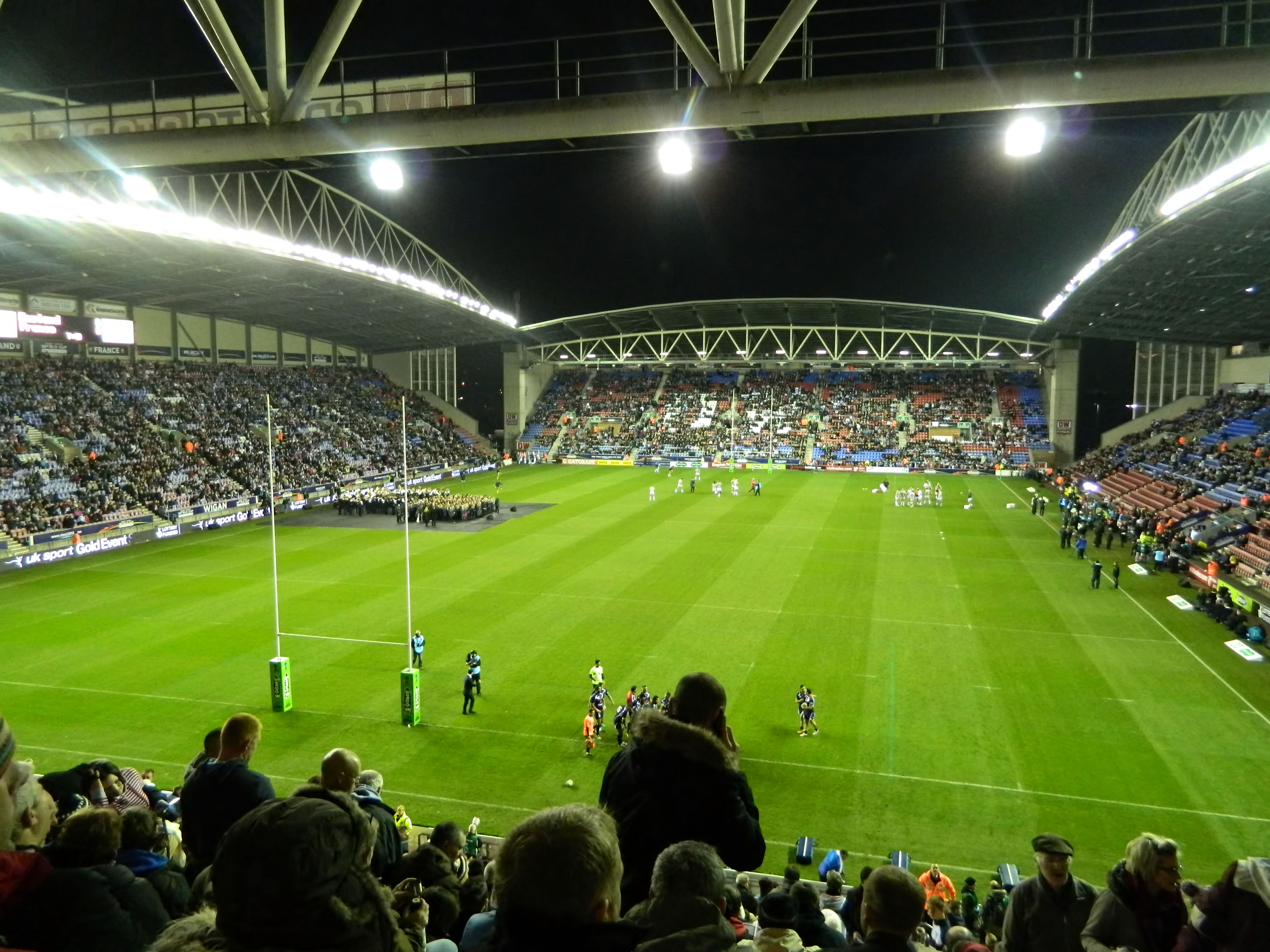
The DW Stadium, home of Wigan

== Head to head ==
Statistics correct as of 14/05/2026

In all competitions, competitive and uncompetitive:

Played	Warrington	Drawn	Wigan
329	127	6	192

=== Meetings in major finals ===
- 1925–26 NFRL Division One Championship Final: Wigan 22–10 Warrington
- 1948–49 Lancashire Cup Final: Wigan 14–8 Warrington
- 1950–51 Lancashire Cup Final: Wigan 28–5 Warrington
- 1989–90 Challenge Cup Final: Wigan 36–14 Warrington
- 1985–86 Lancashire Cup Final: Wigan 34–8 Warrington
- 1986–87 Premiership Final: Wigan 8–0 Warrington
- 1987–88 Lancashire Cup Final: Wigan 28–16 Warrington
- 2013 Super League Grand Final: Wigan 30–16 Warrington
- 2016 Super League Grand Final: Wigan 12–6 Warrington
- 2018 Super League Grand Final: Wigan 12–4 Warrington
- 2024 Challenge Cup Final: Wigan 18-8 Warrington

== Collective honours ==
As of the 2024 Super League Grand Final

Warrington Wolves		Honour	Wigan Warriors	
Rank	No.	Honour	No.	Rank
12th	3	League Championships	24	1st
12th	3	League Leaders	24	1st
4th	9	Challenge Cup	21	1st
4th	2	Premiership	6	1st
2nd	4	League Cup	8	1st
—N/a	0	Charity Shield	4	1st
—N/a	0	World Club Challenge	5	1st
2nd	8	Lancashire League	18	1st
3rd	9	Lancashire Cup	21	1st
—N/a	0	BBC2 Floodlit Trophy	1	5th

== Locker Cup ==
Locker Cup
- Sport: Rugby league
- Number of teams: 2
- Country: (England) (RFL)
- Holders: Warrington Wolves (22nd title)
- Most titles: Wigan Warriors (35 titles)

The Locker Cup (previously the Wardonia Cup until 1972) is a friendly tournament contested by rugby league clubs Warrington Wolves and Wigan Warriors introduced in 1938. The single game tournament was played as a preseason friendly alternating between the club's home grounds annually until the switch to summer rugby in 1996. It was brought back for Magic Weekend 2019, but was cancelled a year later due to the COVID-19 pandemic. Since then it has been played for during the Super League season.

Results

Year	Winner	Score
1938	Warrington Wolves	
1939–1944	Cancelled due to the Second World War	
1945	Wigan Warriors	
1946	Wigan Warriors	
1947	Wigan Warriors	
1948	Warrington Wolves	
1949	Wigan Warriors	
1950	Warrington Wolves	
1951	Wigan Warriors	
1952	Wigan Warriors	
1953	Wigan Warriors	
1954	Warrington Wolves	
1955	Warrington Wolves	
1956	Warrington Wolves	
1957	Wigan Warriors	
1958	Wigan Warriors	
1959	Wigan Warriors	
1960	Wigan Warriors	
1961	Wigan Warriors	
1962	Warrington Wolves	
1963	Warrington Wolves	
1964	Wigan Warriors	
1965	Wigan Warriors	
1966	Warrington Wolves	
1967	Warrington Wolves	
1968	Wigan Warriors	
1969	Wigan Warriors	
1970	Wigan Warriors	
1971	Wigan Warriors	
1972	Wigan Warriors	
1973	Warrington Wolves	
1974	Warrington Wolves	
1975	Wigan Warriors	
1976	Warrington Wolves	
1977	Wigan Warriors	
1978	Warrington Wolves	
1979	Unknown: 10 Wigan Warriors titles and 6 Warrington Wolves titles in this time	
1980	Unknown: 10 Wigan Warriors titles and 6 Warrington Wolves titles in this time	
1981	Unknown: 10 Wigan Warriors titles and 6 Warrington Wolves titles in this time	
1982	Unknown: 10 Wigan Warriors titles and 6 Warrington Wolves titles in this time	
1983	Unknown: 10 Wigan Warriors titles and 6 Warrington Wolves titles in this time	
1984	Unknown: 10 Wigan Warriors titles and 6 Warrington Wolves titles in this time	
1985	Unknown: 10 Wigan Warriors titles and 6 Warrington Wolves titles in this time	
1986	Unknown: 10 Wigan Warriors titles and 6 Warrington Wolves titles in this time	
1987	Unknown: 10 Wigan Warriors titles and 6 Warrington Wolves titles in this time	
1988	Unknown: 10 Wigan Warriors titles and 6 Warrington Wolves titles in this time	
1989	Unknown: 10 Wigan Warriors titles and 6 Warrington Wolves titles in this time	
1990	Unknown: 10 Wigan Warriors titles and 6 Warrington Wolves titles in this time	
1991	Unknown: 10 Wigan Warriors titles and 6 Warrington Wolves titles in this time	
1992	Unknown: 10 Wigan Warriors titles and 6 Warrington Wolves titles in this time	
1993	Unknown: 10 Wigan Warriors titles and 6 Warrington Wolves titles in this time	
1994	Unknown: 10 Wigan Warriors titles and 6 Warrington Wolves titles in this time	
1995	Wigan Warriors	38–30
Due to the switch to Summer Rugby, the fixture did not occur between 1996–2018. From 2019 the Locker Cup was revived and was competed for during the season.
2019	Warrington Wolves	26–14
2020–2021	Cancelled due to the COVID-19 pandemic	
2022	Wigan Warriors	32–6
2023	Wigan Warriors	13–6
2024	Wigan Warriors	19–18
2025	Wigan Warriors	22–20
2026	Warrington Wolves	23-6

== Gallery ==
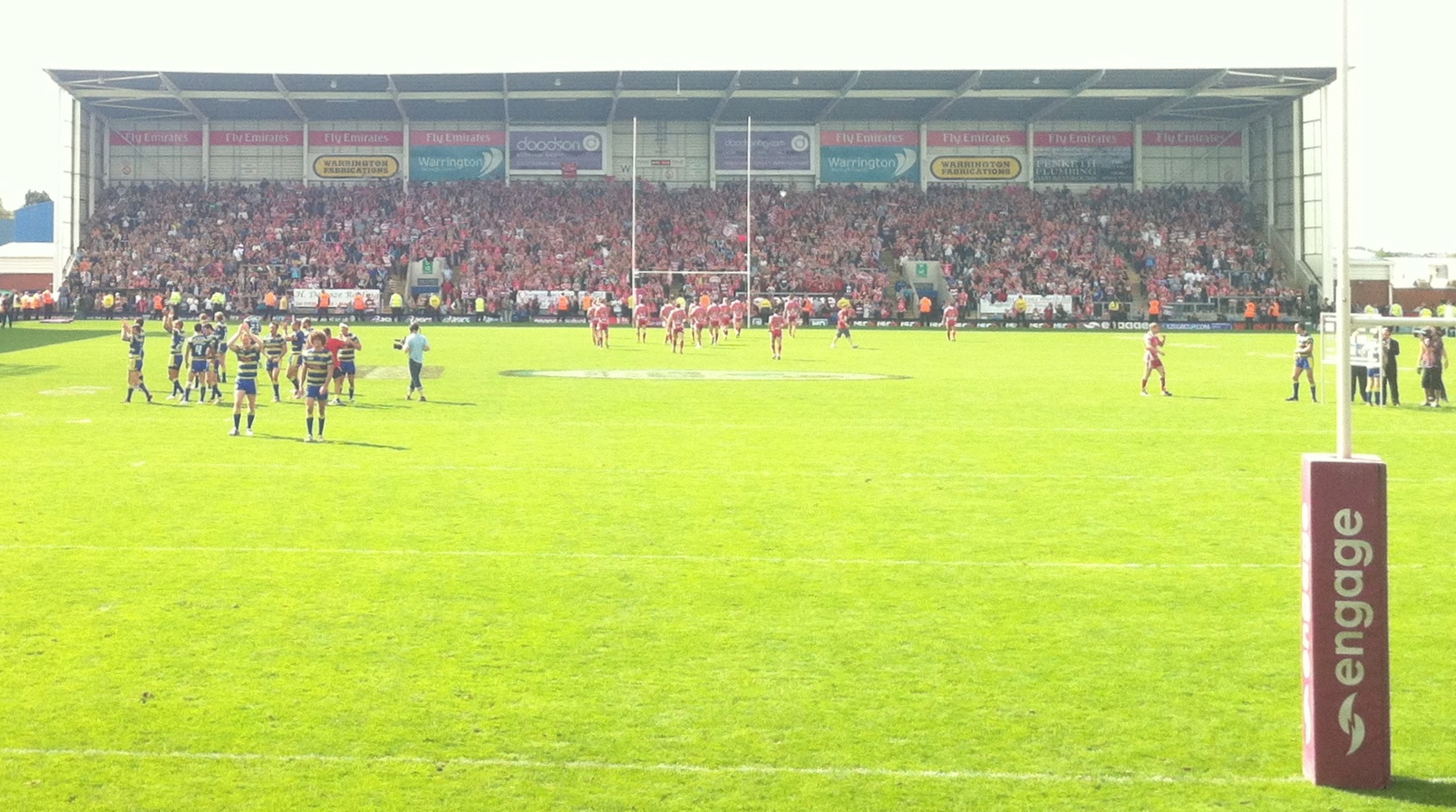
Wigan fans packing out the away end at the Halliwell Jones Stadium ahead of a Super League match on 4 September 2011

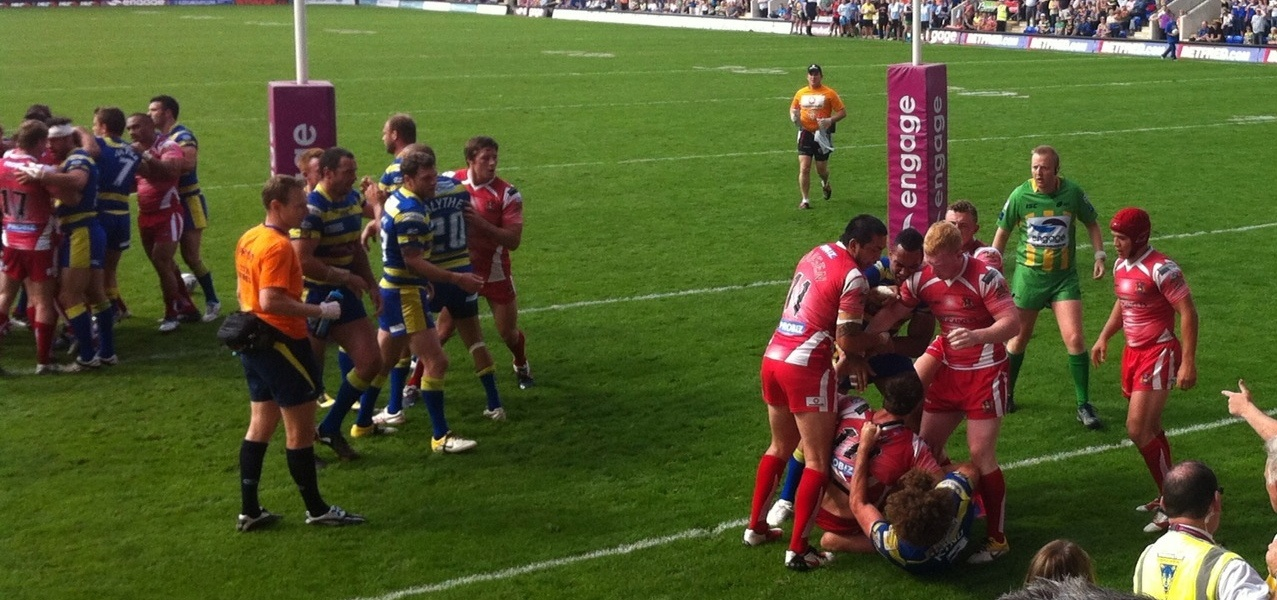
Fights between players of both teams during the match

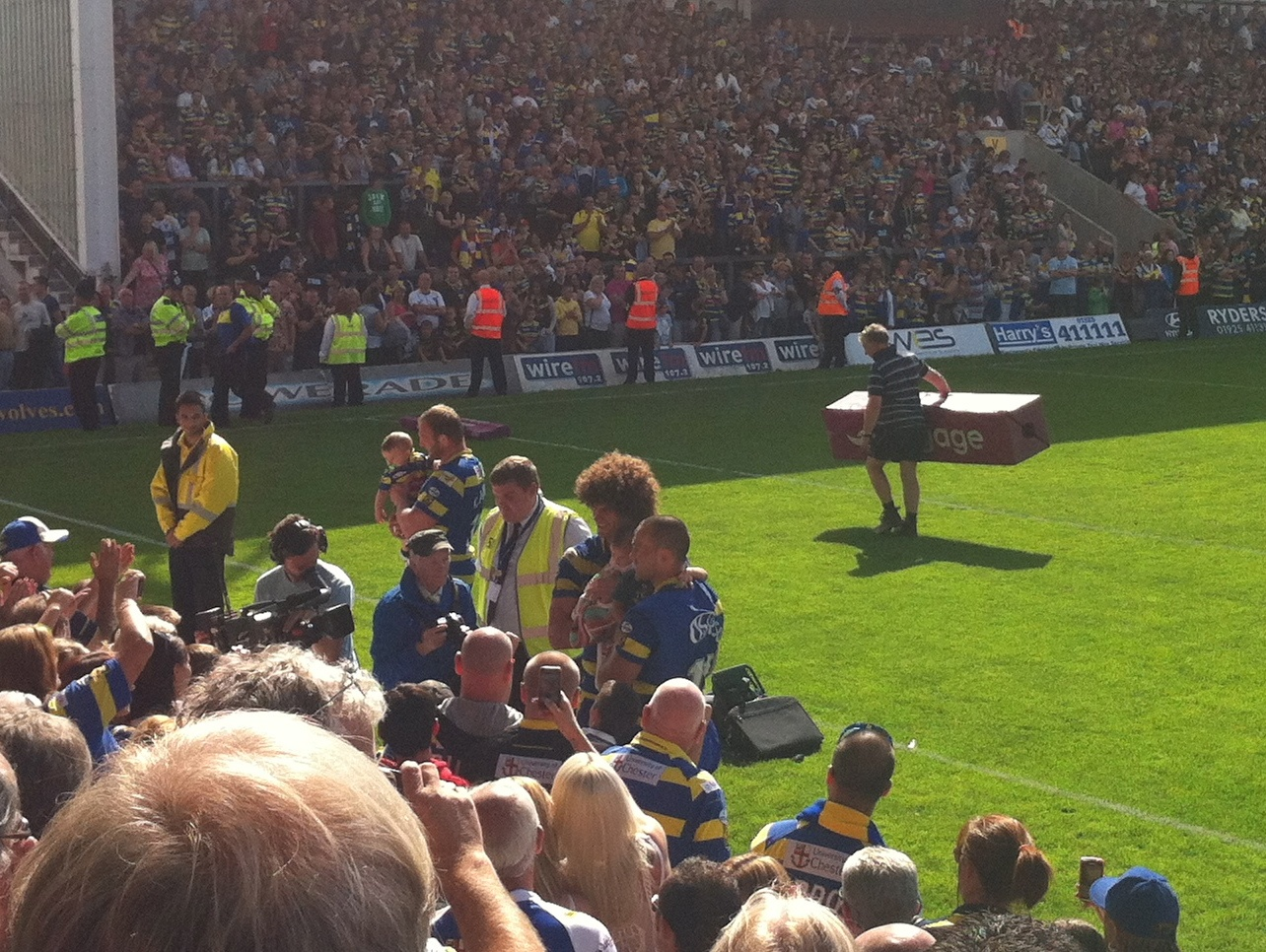
Warrington players celebrating after the game

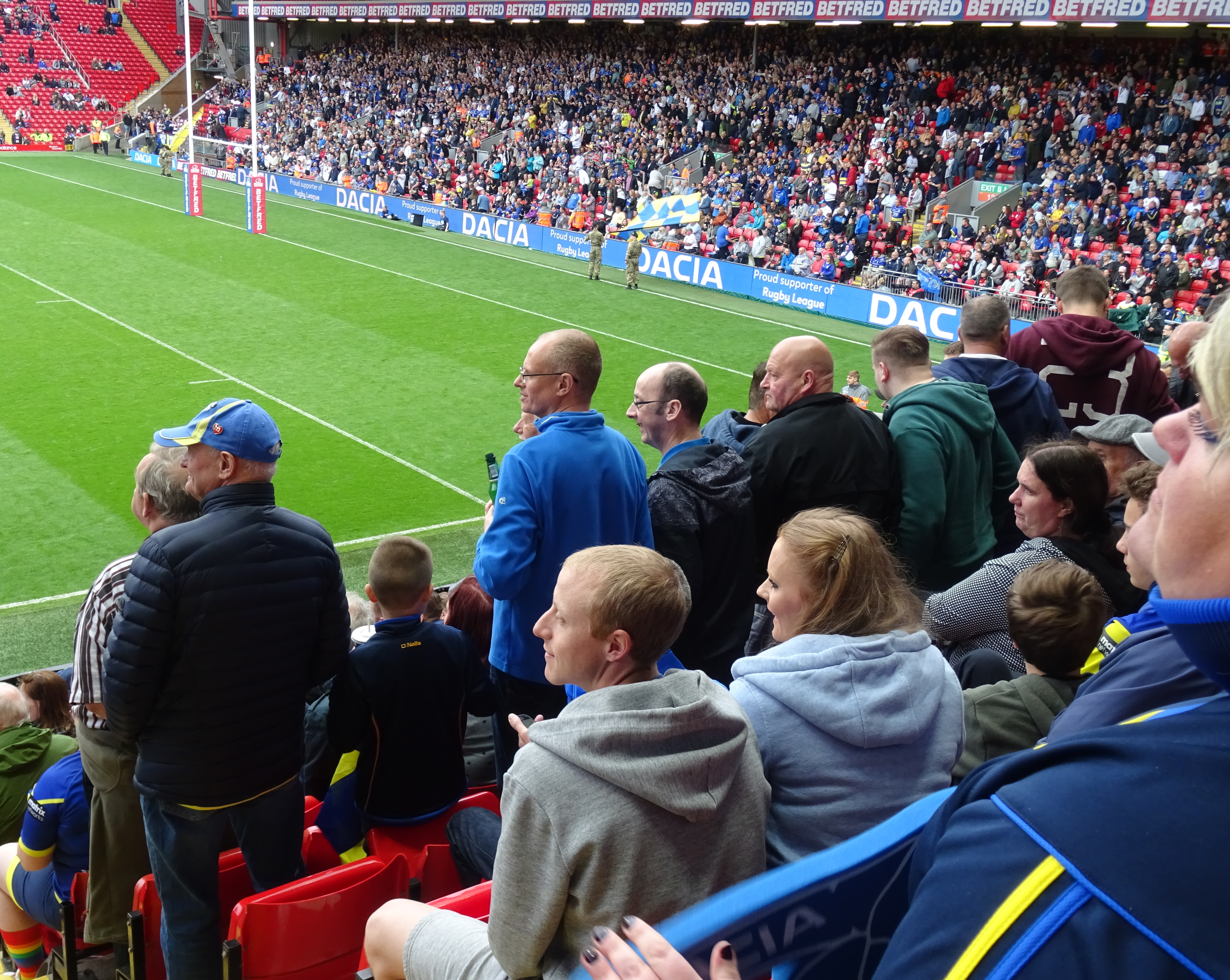
Warrington fans at Anfield during their 2019 Magic Weekend fixture vs Wigan

== See also ==
- Derbies in the Rugby Football League
