= 1993–94 Rugby League Premiership =

1993–94 Premiership
- Structure: National knockout championship
- Teams: 8
- Winners: Wigan
- Runners-up: Castleford
- Harry Sunderland Trophy: Sam Panapa

The 1994 Rugby League Premiership was the 20th end-of-season Rugby League Premiership competition.

The winners were Wigan.

== First round ==
Date	Home team	Score	Away team
6 May 1994	Castleford	28–23	Halifax
8 May 1994	Bradford Northern	42–16	Leeds
8 May 1994	Warrington	16–32	Sheffield Eagles
8 May 1994	Wigan	34–16	St Helens

== Semi-finals ==
Date	Home team	Score	Away team
13 May 1994	Wigan	52–18	Sheffield Eagles
15 May 1994	Bradford Northern	16–24	Castleford

== Final ==
22 May 1994

Wigan	24 – 20	Castleford
Tries: Panapa, Botica, Betts, Farrell; Goals: Botica (4)		Tries: Steadman, Sykes, Sampson; Goals: Steadman (2), Crooks (2)

Old Trafford
Attendance: 35,644
Referee: Stuart Cummings (Widnes)
Player of the Match: Sam Panapa

1	Paul Atcheson
2	Jason Robinson
3	Sam Panapa
4	Gary Connolly
5	Martin Offiah
6	Frano Botica
7	Shaun Edwards
8	Kelvin Skerrett
9	Martin Hall
10	Neil Cowie
11	Denis Betts
12	Andy Farrell
13	Phil Clarke
Substitutions:
14	Joe Lydon for Sam Panapa
15	Mick Cassidy for Neil Cowie
Coach:
John Dorahy

1	St. John Ellis
2	Chris Smith
3	Richard "Richie" Blackmore
4	Tony Smith
5	Simon Middleton
6	Graham Steadman
7	Mike Ford
8	Lee Crooks
9	Richard Russell
10	Dean Sampson
11	Martin Ketteridge
12	Andy Hay
13	Tawera "Sonny" Nikau
Substitutions:
14	Nathan Sykes for Lee Crooks
15	Ian Smales for Martin Ketteridge
Coach:
John Joyner
