= 1986–87 John Player Special Trophy =

- Structure: National knockout championship
- Teams: 36
- Winners: Wigan
- Runners-up: Warrington

This was the sixteenth season of the rugby league League Cup, again known as the John Player Special Trophy for sponsorship purposes.

Wigan won the trophy, beating Warrington 18–4 in the final. The match was played at Burnden Park, Bolton, Greater Manchester. The attendance was 22,144 and receipts were £86041.

== Background ==
This season saw no changes in the entrants, no new members and no withdrawals, the number remaining at thirty-six.

There were no drawn matches in this seasons tournament

== Competition and results ==
=== Preliminary round ===
Involved 4 matches and 8 clubs

Game No	Fixture Date	Home team	Score	Away team	Venue	Att	Rec	Notes	Ref
1	Wed 12 Nov 1986	Halifax	38-23	York	Thrum Hall	2962			
2	Sat 15 Nov 1986	Millom	4-18	Wakefield Trinity	Coronation Field, Millom	2000		1	
3	Sun 16 Nov 1986	Batley	2-8	Myson (Hull)	Mount Pleasant	687		2	
4	Sun 16 Nov 1986	Workington Town	16-6	Huddersfield Barracudas	Derwent Park	420			

=== Round 1 - First Round ===
Involved 16 matches and 32 clubs

Game No	Fixture Date	Home team	Score	Away team	Venue	Att	Rec	Notes	Ref
1	Sat 29 Nov 1986	Wigan	32-10	Leeds	Central Park	9112			
2	Sun 30 Nov 1986	Barrow	36-10	Runcorn Highfield	Craven Park	1771		3	
3	Sun 30 Nov 1986	Blackpool Borough	42-12	Mansfield Marksman	Borough Park	376			
4	Sun 30 Nov 1986	Doncaster	18-14	Hull Kingston Rovers	Bentley Road Stadium/Tattersfield	3084			
5	Sun 30 Nov 1986	Featherstone Rovers	22-18	Workington Town	Post Office Road	1521			
6	Sun 30 Nov 1986	Fulham	24-34	Castleford	Chiswick Poly Sports Grd	1374			
7	Sun 30 Nov 1986	Halifax	36-22	Wakefield Trinity	Thrum Hall	4076			
8	Sun 30 Nov 1986	Leigh	32-10	Rochdale Hornets	Hilton Park	2754			
9	Sun 30 Nov 1986	Myson (Hull)	11-18	Swinton	Craven Park (1)	1648		2	
10	Sun 30 Nov 1986	Oldham	12-22	Bradford Northern	Watersheddings	5642			
11	Sun 30 Nov 1986	Salford	12-27	Hull F.C.	The Willows	2100			
12	Sun 30 Nov 1986	Sheffield Eagles	14-6	Bramley	Owlerton Stadium	415			
13	Sun 30 Nov 1986	Warrington	11-10	Hunslet	Wilderspool	3680			
14	Sun 30 Nov 1986	Whitehaven	8-10	St. Helens	Recreation Ground	3678			
15	Sun 30 Nov 1986	Widnes	82-0	Dewsbury	Naughton Park	2138		4	
16	Thu 04 Dec 1986	Carlisle	8-2	Keighley	Penrith FC	300			

=== Round 2 - Second Round ===
Involved 8 matches and 16 clubs

Game No	Fixture Date	Home team	Score	Away team	Venue	Att	Rec	Notes	Ref
1	Sat 6 Dec 1986	Castleford	22-26	St. Helens	Wheldon Road	4808			
2	Sun 7 Dec 1986	Blackpool Borough	22-48	Hull F.C.	Borough Park	3723		5	
3	Sun 7 Dec 1986	Featherstone Rovers	12-19	Bradford Northern	Post Office Road	3907			
4	Sun 7 Dec 1986	Leigh	26-14	Doncaster	Hilton Park	3363			
5	Sun 7 Dec 1986	Sheffield Eagles	8-14	Barrow	Owlerton Stadium	513		6	
6	Sun 7 Dec 1986	Warrington	44-10	Halifax	Wilderspool	5804			
7	Sun 7 Dec 1986	Wigan	20-14	Swinton	Central Park	9874			
8	Mon 8 Dec 1986	Widnes	36-6	Carlisle	Naughton Park	2016			

=== Round 3 -Quarter-finals ===
Involved 4 matches with 8 clubs

Game No	Fixture Date	Home team	Score	Away team	Venue	Att	Rec	Notes	Ref
1	Sat 13 Dec 1986	Bradford Northern	8-20	Hull F.C.	Odsal	3545			
2	Sun 14 Dec 1986	Barrow	6-16	Widnes	Craven Park	3199			
3	Sun 14 Dec 1986	St. Helens	20-22	Warrington	Knowsley Road	11571			
4	Sun 14 Dec 1986	Wigan	6-2	Leigh	Central Park	11573			

=== Round 4 – Semi-finals ===
Involved 2 matches and 4 clubs

Game No	Fixture Date	Home team	Score	Away team	Venue	Att	Rec	Notes	Ref
1	Sat 20 Dec 1986	Wigan	12-11	Hull F.C.	Headingley	5245			
2	Sat 27 Dec 1986	Warrington	35-4	Widnes	Central Park	6409			

=== Final ===
Game No	Fixture Date	Home team	Score	Away team	Venue	Att	Rec	Notes	Ref
	Saturday 10 January 1987	Wigan	18-4	Warrington	Burnden Park Bolton	22144	86041	7, 8	

==== Teams and scorers ====
Wigan	No.	Warrington
	teams	
Steve Hampson	1	Brian Johnson
David Stephenson	2	Kevin Meadows
Joe Lydon	3	Paul Cullen
Dean Bell	4	Joe Ropati
Henderson Gill	5	Mark Forster
Ellery Hanley	6	Ken Kelly
Shaun Edwards	7	Steve Peters
Graeme West	8	Les Boyd
Martin Dermott	9	Kevin Tamati
Brian Case	10	Bob Jackson
Ian Roberts	11	Gary Sanderson
Ian Potter	12	Mark Roberts
Andy Goodway	13	Mike Gregory
? Not used	14	Ronnie Duane (for Steve Peters 63-minutes)
? Not used	15	Alan Rathbone (for Kevin Tamati half-time)
Graham Lowe	Coach	Tony Barrow
18	score	4
4	HT	4
	Scorers	
	Tries	
Dean Bell (1)	T	Mark Forster (1)
Henderson Gill (2)	T	
Andy Goodway (1)	T	
	Goals	
Henderson Gill (1)	G	
Referee		John Holdsworth (Kippax)
Man of the match		Andy Goodway - Wigan - loose forward
Competition Sponsor		John Player Special

Scoring - Try = four points - Goal = two points - Drop goal = one point

=== Prize money ===
As part of the sponsorship deal and funds, the prize money awarded to the competing teams for this season is as follows :-

Finish Position	Cash prize	No. receiving prize	Total cash
Winner	?	1	?
Runner-up	?	1	?
semi-finalist	?	2	?
loser in Rd 3	?	4	?
loser in Rd 2	?	8	?
Loser in Rd 1	?	16	?
Loser in Prelim Round	?	?	?
Grand Total			

Note - the author is unable to trace the award amounts for this season. Can anyone help ?

=== The road to success ===
This tree excludes any preliminary round fixtures

First round
Wigan	32
Leeds	10
Myson (Hull)	11
Swinton	18
Leigh	32
Rochdale Hornets	10
Doncaster	18
Hull Kingston Rovers	14
Featherstone Rovers	22
Workington Town	18
Oldham	12
Bradford Northern	22
Blackpool Borough	42
Mansfield Marksman	12
Salford	12
Hull F.C.	27
Fulham	24
Castleford	34
Whitehaven	8
St. Helens	10
Warrington	11
Hunslet	11
Halifax	36
Wakefield Trinity	22
Sheffield Eagles	14
Bramley	6
Barrow	36
Runcorn Highfield	10
Widnes	62
Dewsbury	0
Carlisle	8
Keighley	2

Second round
Wigan	20
Swinton	14
Leigh	26
Doncaster	14
Featherstone Rovers	12
Bradford Northern	19
Blackpool Borough	22
Hull F.C.	48
Castleford	22
St. Helens	26
Warrington	44
Halifax	10
Sheffield Eagles	8
Barrow	14
Widnes	36
Carlisle	6

Third round
Wigan	6
Leigh	2
Bradford Northern	8
Hull F.C.	20
St. Helens	20
Warrington	22
Barrow	6
Widnes	16

Semi-finals
Wigan	12
Hull F.C.	11
Warrington	35
Widnes	4

Final
Wigan	18
Warrington	4

== Notes and comments ==
1 * Millom are a Junior (amateur) club from Cumbria, current home ground is the Coronation Field ground.
2 * Myson are a Junior (amateur) club from Hull
3 * RUGBYLEAGUEproject gives score as 36-10 but Wigan official archives gives it as 3-10 (which must be incorrect as Barrow progressed to Round 1)
4 * The highest score, highest score by home team, and highest winning margin between professional clubs, to date
5 * RUGBYLEAGUEproject and Wigan official archives gives the venue as Borough Park, the home of Blackpool Borough but Hull F.C. official archives give the venue as Boulevard, home of Hull F.C.
6 * RUGBYLEAGUEproject gives the score as 8-14 but Wigan official archives gives it as 6-14
7 * The Rugby League Authorities were very unhappy with the television coverage of this final offered by the BBC. The broadcaster missed the first six minutes of the second half televising a horse race from Ireland. They also ignored the trophy presentation entirely and disrupted the pre match entertainment to interview Great Britain coach Malcolm Reilly, yet didn't show that interview anyway!
8 * Burnden Park was the home of English football club Bolton Wanderers from 1895 to 1997. It hosted the 1900-01 FA Cup final replay in which Tottenham Hotspur beat Sheffield United 3.1. The record attendance was for a 6th round F A Cup match with Stoke City (Stanley Matthews played for Stoke at the time) at which, although the ground capacity was set at 70,000, an estimated 85,000 fans crowded in, and when two crush barriers broke, the result was 33 fans killed and another 400 injured. The capacity at closure was a mere 25,000

== See also ==
- 1986–87 Rugby Football League season
- 1986 Lancashire Cup
- 1986 Yorkshire Cup
- John Player Special Trophy
- Rugby league county cups
