= 1991–92 Rugby League Premiership =

1991–92 Premiership
- Structure: National knockout championship
- Teams: 8
- Winners: Wigan
- Runners-up: St Helens

The 1991–92 Rugby League Premiership was the 18th end of season Rugby League Premiership competition.

The winners were Wigan.

== First round ==
Date	Home	Score	Away	Venue	Referee	Attendance	Notes
26 April 1992	Castleford	28–18	Wakefield Trinity	Wheldon Road	C. Morris	6,616	
26 April 1992	St Helens	52–6	Halifax	Knowsley Road	J. Holdsworth	9,146	
26 April 1992	Warrington	18–18	Leeds	Wilderspool	S. Cummings	4,937	
26 April 1992	Wigan	42–16	Widnes	Central Park	R. Smith	12,547	

=== Replay ===
Date	Home	Score	Away	Venue	Referee	Attendance	Notes
29 April 1992	Leeds	22–18	Warrington	Headingley	S. Cummings	8,221	

== Semi-finals ==
In Wigan's semi-final against Leeds, Martin Offiah scored 10 tries, a new club record for most tries by one player in a single game.

Date	Home	Score	Away	Venue	Referee	Attendance	Notes
5 May 1992	St Helens	30–14	Castleford	Knowsley Road	P. Volante	9,843	
5 May 1992	Wigan	74–6	Leeds	Central Park	C. Morris	18,261	

== Final ==
17 May 1992

Wigan	48–16	St Helens
Tries: Myers, Miles, Offiah (2), Platt, Betts (2); Goals: Botica (10)		Tries: Sullivan (2), Loughlin; Goals: Loughlin (2)

Old Trafford
Attendance: 33,157
Referee: John Holdsworth
Player of the Match: Andy Platt

1	Joe Lydon
2	Martin Offiah
3	Frano Botica
4	Gene Miles
5	Dean Bell
6	Billy McGinty
7	Neil Cowie
8	Shaun Edwards
9	Denis Betts
10	Andy Platt
11	Martin Dermott
12	Phil Clarke
13	Steve Hampson
Substitutions:
14	Sam Panapa for Billy McGinty
15	David Myers for Steve Hampson
Coach:
John Monie

1	Phil Veivers
2	Alan Hunte
3	Gary Connolly
4	Paul Loughlin
5	Anthony Sullivan
6	Tea Ropati
7	Paul Bishop
8	Jon Neill
9	Sonny Nickle
10	George Mann
11	Shane Cooper
12	Kevin Ward
13	Bernard Dwyer
Substitutions:
14	Jonathan Griffiths for Gary Connolly
15	Paul Groves for Jonathan Neill
Coach:
Mike McClennan
