= 1989–90 Rugby League Divisional Premiership =

1989–90 Divisional Premiership Trophy
- Structure: National knockout championship
- Teams: 8
- Winners: Oldham
- Runners-up: Hull Kingston Rovers

The 1989–90 Rugby League Divisional Premiership was the 4th end-of-season Rugby League Divisional Premiership competition.

The competition was contested by the top eight teams in the second Division. The winners were Oldham.

== First round ==
Date	Team one	Score	Team two
21 April 1990	Ryedale-York	24–7	Halifax
22 April 1990	Hull Kingston Rovers	40–6	Fulham
22 April 1990	Oldham	32–10	Swinton
22 April 1990	Rochdale Hornets	18–20	Dewsbury

== Semi-finals ==
Date	Team one	Score	Team two
6 May 1990	Hull Kingston Rovers	36–8	Dewsbury
6 May 1990	Oldham	32–8	Ryedale-York

== Final ==
13 May 1990

Oldham	30 – 29	Hull Kingston Rovers
Tries: Lord, Ford, Henderson, Irving, Ruane, Martyn; Goals: Hyde (2), Platt		Tries: Parker (2), Clark, Lyman, Harrison; Goals: Fletcher (4); Drop goals: Parker

Old Trafford, Manchester
Referee: Robin Whitfield (Widnes)
Player of the Match: Mike Ford

1	Duncan Platt
2	Richard Irving
3	Gary Hyde
4	John Henderson
5	Paul Lord
6	Brett Clark
7	Mike Ford (c)
8	Leo Casey
9	Andrew Ruane
10	John Fieldhouse
11	Paul Round
12	Charlie McAlister
13	Richard Russell
Substitutes:
14	Tommy Martyn
15	Keith Newton
Coach:
Tony Barrow

1	David Lightfoot
2	Garry Clark
3	Mike Fletcher
4	Greg Austin
5	Anthony Sullivan
6	Wayne Parker
7	David Bishop
8	Bryan Niebling (c)
9	Chris Rudd
10	Asuquo Ema
11	Des Harrison
12	Andy Thompson
13	Paul Lyman
Substitutes:
14	Jimmy Irvine
15	Colin Armstrong
Coach:
Roger Millward

== See also ==
- 1989–90 Rugby Football League season
