= 1991–92 Lancashire Cup =

- Structure: Regional knockout championship
- Teams: 17
- Winners: St Helens
- Runners-up: Rochdale Hornets

The 1991–92 Lancashire Cup was the 79th occasion on which the Lancashire Cup competition had been held. St Helens won the trophy by beating Rochdale Hornets by the score of 24–14 in the final.

== Background ==
The total entrants remained the same as last season, i.e. at 17.
This necessitated the need for a preliminary round (consisting of just 1 game). The first round (proper) then involved 16 clubs.

== Competition and results ==
=== Preliminary round ===
Involved one match and two clubs. Widnes were the reigning Lancashire Cup champions, and their defeat to Second Division Workington Town was considered a major upset.

Game No	Fixture Date	Home team	Score	Away team	Venue	Att	Ref
	Sun 25 Aug 1991	Workington Town	27–18	Widnes	Derwent Park	3499	

=== First Round ===
Involved eight matches and 16 clubs. Trafford Borough's 12–104 loss to St Helens was a club record defeat.

Game No	Fixture Date	Home team	Score	Away team	Venue	Att	Ref
1	Sun 15 Sep 1991	Highfield	11–34	Rochdale Hornets	Hoghton Road Stadium	700	
2	Sun 15 Sep 1991	Leigh	59–12	Chorley Borough	Hilton Park	2415	
3	Sun 15 Sep 1991	London Crusaders	10–38	Wigan	Barnet Copthall	1893	
4	Sun 15 Sep 1991	St. Helens	104–12	Trafford Borough	Knowsley Road	4550	
5	Sun 15 Sep 1991	Salford	22–16	Warrington	The Willows	3656	
6	Sun 15 Sep 1991	Swinton	21–22	Oldham	Station Road	3285	
7	Sun 15 Sep 1991	Whitehaven	12–44	Carlisle	Recreation Ground	873	
8	Sun 15 Sep 1991	Workington Town	12–6	Barrow	Derwent Park	2721	

=== Second Round ===
Involved four matches and eight clubs.

Game No	Fixture Date	Home team	Score	Away team	Venue	Att	Ref
1	Thu 26 Sep 1991	Rochdale Hornets	25–18	Salford	Spotland	1829	
2	Thu 26 Sep 1991	St. Helens	39–26	Oldham	Knowsley Road	7025	
3	Thu 26 Sep 1991	Wigan	42–12	Leigh	Central Park	11153	
4	Thu 26 Sep 1991	Workington Town	2–11	Carlisle	Derwent Park	4278	

=== Semi-finals ===
Involved 2 matches and 4 clubs

Game No	Fixture Date	Home team	Score	Away team	Venue	Att	Ref
1	Thu 10 Oct 1991	Rochdale Hornets	19–6	Carlisle	Spotland	1842	
2	Thu 10 Oct 1991	St. Helens	28–16	Wigan	Knowsley Road	17125	

=== Final ===
The match was played at Wilderspool, Warrington. The attendance was 9,269 and receipts were £44,278. St Helens won the final, but the victory was marred by the dismissal of Paul Bishop, who was sent off after the end of the match for stamping on Hornets stand-off Brett Clark.

20 October 1991

St. Helens	24 – 14	Rochdale Hornets
Tries: Veivers (2), Mann (2), Bishop; Goals: Bishop (2)		Tries: Duane, Abram, Kuiti; Goals: Whitfield

Wilderspool, Warrington
Attendance: 9,269
Referee: David Campbell (Widnes)
Player of the Match: Bob Marsden

==== Teams ====
St. Helens	№	Rochdale Hornets
Dave Tanner	1	Colin Whitfield (c)
Mike Riley	2	Phil Fox
Gary Connolly	3	Darren Abram
Tea Ropati	4	Ronnie Duane
Anthony Sullivan	5	Tony Garrity
Phil Veivers	6	Brett Clark
Paul Bishop	7	Steve Gartland
Jon Neill	8	Tony Humphries
Paul Groves	9	Martin Hall
Kevin Ward	10	Bob Marsden
John Harrison	11	Cliff Eccles
George Mann	12	Paul Okesene
Shane Cooper (c)	13	Mike Kuiti
	Subs	
Mark Bailey (for Connolly)	14	Matt Calland (for Fox)
Paul Forber (for Neill)	15	Simon Bamber (for Eccles)
Mike McClennan	Coach	Allan Agar

=== The road to success ===
This chart excludes the match in the preliminary round

First round
St. Helens	104
Trafford Borough	2
Swinton	21
Oldham	22
London Crusaders	10
Wigan	38
Leigh	59
Chorley Borough	12
Highfield	11
Rochdale Hornets	34
Salford	22
Warrington	16
Workington Town	12
Barrow	6
Whitehaven	12
Carlisle	44

Second round
St. Helens	39
Oldham	26
Wigan	49
Leigh	12
Rochdale Hornets	25
Salford	18
Workington Town	2
Carlisle	11

Semi-finals
St. Helens	28
Wigan	16
Rochdale Hornets	19
Carlisle	6

Final
St. Helens	24
Rochdale Hornets	14

== See also ==
- 1991–92 Rugby Football League season
- Rugby league county cups
