= 1989–90 Challenge Cup =

Rugby league competition

1990 Silk Cut Challenge Cup
- Duration: 6 Rounds
- Winners: Wigan
- Runners-up: Warrington
- Lance Todd Trophy: Andy Gregory

The 1990 Challenge Cup was the 89th staging of rugby league's oldest knockout competition, the Challenge Cup. Known as the Silk Cut Challenge Cup for sponsorship reasons, the final was contested by Wigan and Warrington at Wembley. Wigan won the match 36–14.

== Preliminary round ==
Date	Team One	Team Two	Score
14 Jan	Fulham	Doncaster	23-16
14 Jan	Leeds	Bradford Northern	8-24
14 Jan	Oldham	Huddersfield	30-8
14 Jan	St Helens	Castleford	39-12

== First round ==
Date	Team One	Team Two	Score
27 Jan	Warrington	Featherstone Rovers	20-12
28 Jan	Barrow	Sheffield Eagles	12-22
28 Jan	Bramley	St Helens	14-22
28 Jan	Fulham	Ryedale-York	14-14
28 Jan	Hull FC	Halifax	46-0
28 Jan	Hull Kingston Rovers	Wigan	4-6
28 Jan	Nottingham	Dewsbury	2-32
28 Jan	Oldham	Workington Town	30-8
28 Jan	Runcorn	Bradford Northern	12-22
28 Jan	Salford	Bisons	56-6
28 Jan	Swinton	Wakefield Trinity	10-10
28 Jan	Trafford	Hunslet	14-7
28 Jan	Whitehaven	Leigh	23-22
28 Jan	Widnes	Batley	26-10
30 Jan	Chorley	Keighley	6-12
30 Jan	Rochdale Hornets	Carlisle	38-6
31 Jan - replay	Ryedale-York	Fulham	12-16
31 Jan - replay	Wakefield Trinity	Swinton	32-4

== Second round ==
Date	Team One	Team Two	Score
10 Feb	Hull FC	St Helens	12-24
11 Feb	Fulham	Bradford Northern	2-20
11 Feb	Salford	Oldham	7-18
11 Feb	Wakefield Trinity	Sheffield Eagles	27-12
11 Feb	Warrington	Trafford	20-11
11 Feb	Whitehaven	Keighley	46-10
11 Feb	Widnes	Rochdale Hornets	22-16
11 Feb	Wigan	Dewsbury	30-6

== Quarter-finals ==
Date	Team One	Team Two	Score
24 Feb	Wakefield Trinity	Wigan	14–26
25 Feb	Bradford Northern	Warrington	10–12
25 Feb	St Helens	Whitehaven	44–10
25 Feb	Widnes	Oldham	4–16

== Semi finals ==
10 March 1990

Wigan	20 – 14	St. Helens
Try: Hampson, Byrne, Goodway; Goal: Lydon (4)	Report	Try: Devine, Quirk; Goal: Loughlin (3)

Old Trafford, Manchester
Attendance: 26,489

31 March 1990

Warrington	10 – 6	Oldham
Try: Crompton, Forster; Goal: Turner	Report	Try: Irving; Goal: Platt

Central Park, Wigan
Attendance: 15,631

== Final ==
28 April 1990

Wigan	36 – 14	Warrington
Try: Betts, Preston (2), Iro (2), Hanley; Goal: Lydon (6)	Report	Try: Gregory, Lyon; Goal: Bishop (2), Darbyshire

Wembley, London
Attendance: 77,729
Player of the Match: Andy Gregory

FB	1	Steve Hampson
RW	2	Joe Lydon
RC	3	Kevin Iro
LC	4	Dean Bell
LW	5	Mark Preston
SO	6	Shaun Edwards
SH	7	Andy Gregory
PR	8	Adrian Shelford
HK	9	Martin Dermott
PR	10	Andy Platt
SR	11	Denis Betts
SR	12	Andy Goodway
LF	13	Ellery Hanley (c)
Substitutions:
IC	14	Bobbie Goulding
IC	15	Ian Gildart
Coach:
John Monie

FB	1	David Lyon
RW	2	Des Drummond
RC	3	Gary Mercer
LC	4	Paul Darbyshire
LW	5	Mark Forster
SO	6	Martin Crompton
SH	7	Paul Bishop
PR	8	Tony Burke
HK	9	Duane Mann
PR	10	Neil Harmon
SR	11	Bob Jackson
SR	12	Gary Sanderson
LF	13	Mike Gregory (c)
Substitutions:
IC	14	Billy McGinty
IC	15	Mark Thomas
Coach:
Brian Johnson
