= 1988–89 Challenge Cup =

Rugby league tournament held in 1989

1989 Silk Cut Challenge Cup
- Duration: 6 Rounds
- Winners: Wigan
- Runners-up: St. Helens
- Lance Todd Trophy: Ellery Hanley

The 1989 Challenge Cup was the 88th staging of rugby league's oldest knockout competition, the Challenge Cup. Known as the Silk Cut Challenge Cup for sponsorship reasons, the final was contested by Wigan and St. Helens at Wembley. Wigan won the match 27–0.

== Preliminary round ==
Date	Team One	Team Two	Score
15 Jan	Barrow Island	Thatto Heath	11-18
15 Jan	Leeds	Hunslet	32-6
15 Jan	Milford Amateurs	Swinton	0-36
15 Jan	Wakefield Trinity	Bramley	18-10
15 Jan	West Hull	Doncaster	2-48
15 Jan	York	Workington Town	35-8

== First round ==
Date	Team One	Team Two	Score
28 Jan	Hull FC	Castleford	4-7
29 Jan	Barrow	Huddersfield	38-16
29 Jan	Carlisle	Mansfield	58-1
29 Jan	Chorley	Thatto Heath	8-4
29 Jan	Dewsbury	Oldham	9-40
29 Jan	Doncaster	Wigan	6-38
29 Jan	Fulham	Bradford Northern	10-28
29 Jan	Rochdale Hornets	Hull Kingston Rovers	24-28
29 Jan	Runcorn	Keighley	10-28
29 Jan	Salford	Widnes	14-18
29 Jan	Sheffield Eagles	Leigh	23-17
29 Jan	Swinton	St Helens	5-16
29 Jan	Wakefield Trinity	Batley	34-4
29 Jan	Warrington	Halifax	25-8
29 Jan	Whitehaven	Featherstone Rovers	0-32
29 Jan	York	Leeds	9-28

== Second round ==
Date	Team One	Team Two	Score
11 Feb	Castleford	Widnes	18-32
12 Feb	Bradford Northern	Wigan	4-17
12 Feb	Hull Kingston Rovers	Chorley	28-4
12 Feb	Leeds	Carlisle	24-4
12 Feb	St Helens	Barrow	28-6
12 Feb	Sheffield Eagles	Oldham	20-32
12 Feb	Wakefield Trinity	Featherstone Rovers	4-10
12 Feb	Warrington	Keighley	56-7

== Quarter-finals ==
Date	Team One	Team Two	Score
25 Feb	Oldham	Wigan	4-12
26 Feb	Hull Kingston Rovers	Warrington	4-30
26 Feb	Leeds	Widnes	4-24
26 Feb	St Helens	Featherstone Rovers	32-3

== Semi finals ==
11 March 1989

St. Helens	16 – 14	Widnes
Try: Quirk (2), Bloor; Goal: Loughlin (2)	Report	Try: Wright, D. Hulme; Goal: Currier (3)

Central Park, Wigan
Attendance: 17,119

25 March 1989

Wigan	13 – 6	Warrington
Try: Lydon, Edwards; Goal: Lydon (2); Drop goal: Lydon	Report	Goal: Woods (3)

Maine Road, Manchester
Attendance: 26,529

== Final ==
This was the first time since 1951 that a team had been held scoreless in a Challenge Cup Final at Wembley.

Saturday 29 April, 1989

Wigan	27 – 0	St. Helens
Tries: Kevin Iro (2); Ellery Hanley; Andy Gregory; Steve Hampson; Goals: Joe Lydon (3/5); Drop Goals: Andy Gregory (1)	Report	Tries: Goals:

Wembley Stadium, London
Attendance: 78,000
Referee: Ray Tennant
Player of the Match: Ellery Hanley

FB	1	Steve Hampson
RW	2	Tony Iro
RC	3	Kevin Iro
LC	4	Dean Bell
LW	5	Joe Lydon
SO	6	Shaun Edwards
SH	7	Andy Gregory
PR	8	Ian Lucas
HK	9	Nicky Kiss
PR	10	Adrian Shelford
SR	11	Andy Platt
SR	12	Ian Potter
LF	13	Ellery Hanley (c)
Substitutions:
IC	14	Denis Betts
IC	15	Andy Goodway
Coach:
Graham Lowe

FB	1	Gary Connolly
RW	2	Mike O'Connor
RC	3	Phil Veivers
LC	4	Paul Loughlin
LW	5	Les Quirk
SO	6	Shane Cooper
SH	7	Neil Holding
PR	8	Tony Burke
HK	9	Paul Groves
PR	10	Paul Forber
SR	11	Bernard Dwyer
SR	12	Roy Haggerty
LF	13	Paul Vautin (c)
Substitutions:
IC	14	Darren Bloor
IC	15	Stuart Evans
Coach:
Alex Murphy
