= 1987–88 Lancashire Cup =

- Structure: Regional knockout championship
- Teams: 16
- Winners: Wigan
- Runners-up: Warrington

The 1987–88 Lancashire Cup was the seventy-fifth occasion on which the Lancashire Cup competition had been held. It was contested during the 1987–88 Rugby Football League season by clubs in Lancashire. Wigan won the trophy by beating Warrington in the final.

== Results ==
This season the total number of entrants remained at the 16 level. With this full sixteen members there was no need for “blank” or “dummy” fixtures or any byes.

=== Round 1 ===
Round 1 involved 8 matches (with no byes) and 16 clubs.

Game No	Fixture Date	Home team	Score	Away team	Venue	Att	Rec	Notes	Ref
1	Sun 13 Sep 1987	Barrow	2-36	Wigan	Craven Park	5950			
2	Sun 13 Sep 1987	Leigh	27-21	St. Helens	Hilton Park	7747			
3	Sun 13 Sep 1987	Runcorn Highfield	6-40	Widnes	Canal Street	2679			
4	Sun 13 Sep 1987	Salford	58-4	Fulham	The Willows	1640			
5	Sun 13 Sep 1987	Swinton	38-20	Rochdale Hornets	Station Road	1443			
6	Sun 13 Sep 1987	Warrington	42-8	Oldham	Wilderspool	5615			
7	Sun 13 Sep 1987	Whitehaven	28-12	Carlisle	Recreation Ground	2075			
8	Sun 13 Sep 1987	Workington Town	12-10	Springfield Borough	Derwent Park	549		1	

=== Round 2 - Quarter-finals ===
Round 2 involved 4 matches and 8 clubs.

Game No	Fixture Date	Home team	Score	Away team	Venue	Att	Rec	Notes	Ref
1	Wed 23 Sep 1987	Swinton	22-14	Leigh	Station Road	3824			
2	Wed 23 Sep 1987	Wigan	42-2	Salford	Central Park	11633			
3	Wed 23 Sep 1987	Workington Town	10-50	Warrington	Derwent Park	1759			
4	Thu 24 Sep 1987	Whitehaven	14-20	Widnes	Recreation Ground	3152			

=== Round 3 – Semi-finals ===
Round 3 involved 2 matches and 4 clubs

Game No	Fixture Date	Home team	Score	Away team	Venue	Att	Rec	Notes	Ref
1	Wed 30 Sep 1987	Warrington	44-6	Swinton	Wilderspool	5296			
2	Wed 30 Sep 1987	Widnes	12-20	Wigan	Naughton Park	7306			

=== Final ===
The final was contested by Wigan and Warrington, with Wigan winning by the score of 28–16. The match was played at Knowsley Road, Eccleston, St Helens, Merseyside, (historically in the county of Lancashire). The attendance was 20,237 and receipts were £67,339. This was Wigan’s fourth appearance in four years and a third victory in what would be a run of four victories and five appearances in five successive years. The attendance was again at a very pleasing level, the fourth of the five year period when it would reach around the 20,000 level, and the receipts reached a new record level exceeding the previous record by almost £7,000.

Game No	Fixture Date	Home team	Score	Away team	Venue	Att	Rec	Notes	Ref
	Sunday 11 October 1987	Wigan	28-16	Warrington	Knowsley Road	20237	67339	2 3	

==== Teams and scorers ====
Wigan	No.	Warrington
	teams	
Steve Hampson	1	Brian Johnson
Richard Russell (see note 4)	2	Des Drummond
David Stephenson	3	Mark Forster
Joe Lydon	4	Barry Peters
Henderson Gill	5	Brian Carbert
Shaun Edwards	6	John Woods
Andy Gregory	7	Keith Holden, Jr.
Brian Case	8	Kevin Tamati
Nicky Kiss	9	Carl Webb
Shaun Wane	10	Tony Humphries
Andy Goodway	11	Gary Sanderson
Ian Potter	12	Mark Roberts
Ellery Hanley	13	Mike Gregory
Dean Bell	14	?
Graeme West (for Shaun Wane 52min)	15	Neil Harmon (for Carl Webb 7min)
Graham Lowe	Coach	
28	score	16
14	HT	12
	Scorers	
	Tries	
Ellery Hanley (2)	T	Mark Forster (2)
Henderson Gill (1)	T	Mike Gregory (1)
Graeme West (1)	T	
	Goals	
David Stephenson (1)	G	John Woods (2)
Joe Lydon (5)	G	
Referee		G F Lindop (Wakefield)
Man of the match		Shaun Edwards - Wigan - stand-off
sponsored by		Greenall Whitley
Competition Sponsor		Grünhalle Lager

Scoring - Try = four points - Goal = two points - Drop goal = one point

=== Pathway to the final ===
First round
Whitehaven	28
Carlisle	12
Runcorn Highfield	6
Widnes	40
Barrow	2
Wigan	36
Salford	58
Fulham	4
Workington Town	12
Springfield Borough	10
Warrington	42
Oldham	8
Swinton	38
Rochdale Hornets	20
Leigh	27
St. Helens	21

Second round
Whitehaven	14
Widnes	20
Wigan	42
Salford	2
Workington Town	10
Warrington	50
Swinton	22
Leigh	14

Semi-finals
Widnes	12
Wigan	20
Warrington	44
Swinton	6

Final
Wigan	28
Warrington	16

== Notes ==
1 * The first Lancashire Cup match played by the newly named/formed club, Springfield Borough
2 * The attendance is given as 20,234 in the RUGBYLEAGUEproject data, and as 20,237 in the Rothmans Rugby League Yearbook 1991–1992. The Wigan official archives give 20,234 in the results details, and 20,237 in the game details
3 * Knowsley Road was the home ground of St. Helens from 1890 to 2010. The final capacity was in the region of 18,000, although the actual record attendance was 35,695, set on 26 December 1949, for a league game between St Helens and Wigan
4 * The Rothmans Rugby League Yearbook 1991-1992 shows the Wigan number 2 position occupied by Richard Russell - The official Wigan archives show the number 2 position as Richard Marshall

== See also ==
- Rugby league county cups
