= Steve Hampson =

English rugby league coach

Personal information
- Full name: Stephen Hampson
- Born: 14 August 1961 (age 64)

Playing information
- Position: Fullback
Club
| Years | Team | Pld | T | G | FG | P |
|---|---|---|---|---|---|---|
| 1983–93 | Wigan | 296+8 | 55 | 48 | 3 | 319 |
| 1989 | Illawarra Steelers | 11 | 1 | 0 | 0 | 4 |
| 1993–95 | Halifax | 24+1 | 5 | 0 | 1 | 21 |
| 1995–96 | Salford Reds | 39 | 11 | 11 | 8 | 74 |
| 1997 | Widnes Vikings | 12+6 | 4 | 0 | 0 | 16 |
| | Total | 397 | 76 | 59 | 12 | 434 |
Representative
| Years | Team | Pld | T | G | FG | P |
| 1987–92 | Great Britain | 12 | 1 | 0 | 0 | 4 |
| 1987–89 | Lancashire | 3 | 1 | 0 | 0 | 4 |

Coaching information
Club
| Years | Team | Gms | W | D | L | W% |
| 1998–2000 | Lancashire Lynx | 0 | 0 | 0 | 0 |

Stephen Hampson (born 14 August 1961) is a former rugby union and professional rugby league footballer who played as a fullback in the 1970s, 1980s and 1990s. He coached rugby league in the 1990s, 2000s and 2010s.

He played club level rugby union for Vulcan RUFC (1978–83) in Newton-le-Willows, and representative level rugby league for Great Britain, and at club level for Wigan, Illawarra Steelers, Halifax, Salford Reds and the Widnes Vikings.

== Playing career ==
=== Club career ===
Hampson started his rugby league career with Wigan, joining from Newton-le-Willows based rugby union club Vulcan RUFC in October 1983. After a promising start during his first season at the club, Hampson broke his leg in a match against Hull Kingston Rovers in April 1984, and then suffered a broken wrist in a reserve team game during his recovery. The injuries meant that he only played one first team game during the 1984–85 season.

Hampson won his first honours with Wigan during the 1985–86 season, appearing as a substitute (replacing wing Gary Henley-Smith) in Wigan's 34–8 victory over Warrington in the 1985 Lancashire Cup Final at Knowsley Road, St Helens, on Sunday 13 October 1985. He started at fullback in Wigan's 11–8 victory over Hull Kingston Rovers in the 1985–86 John Player Special Trophy Final at Elland Road, Leeds on Saturday 11 January 1986.

Hampson was an unused substitute in the 1986 Lancashire Cup final against Oldham, but played fullback in the 18–4 victory over Warrington in the 1986–87 John Player Special Trophy Final during the 1986–87 season at Burnden Park, Bolton on Saturday 10 January 1987.

During the 1987–88 season, Hampson played at fullback for defending champions Wigan in their 1987 World Club Challenge victory against the visiting Manly-Warringah Sea Eagles. A few days later, he played in the 28–16 victory over Warrington in the 1987 Lancashire Cup Final at Knowsley Road, St Helens, on Sunday 11 October 1987.

He played fullback in the 22–17 victory over Salford in the 1988 Lancashire Cup Final during the 1988–89 season at Knowsley Road, St. Helens on Sunday 23 October 1988, and played fullback in the 12–6 victory over Widnes in the 1988–89 John Player Special Trophy Final at Burnden Park, Bolton on Saturday 7 January 1989.

Hampson played fullback (replaced by substitute Neil Cowie) in the 5–4 victory over St Helens in the 1992 Lancashire Cup Final during the 1992–93 season at Knowsley Road, St Helens on Sunday 18 October 1992, and played fullback, and scored a drop goal in the 15–8 victory over Bradford Northern in the 1992–93 Regal Trophy Final at Elland Road, Leeds on Saturday 23 January 1993.

In 1989, he played alongside fellow import Andy Gregory for the Illawarra Steelers in the NSWRL premiership. Although the club finished bottom of the league table, they reached the final of the 1989 Panasonic Cup. Hampson played and scored a try in the final, but the match ended in a 20–22 defeat against Brisbane Broncos.

Hampson played in the club's 1991 World Club Challenge victory against the visiting Penrith Panthers. He spent almost ten years as a player for the club between 1983 and 1993. During his Wigan career, he made 296 starts (plus 8 subs bench appearances), scoring 55 tries, 48 conversions and 3 drop goals, a total of 319 points. Wigan reached the Challenge Cup Final eight times while Hampson was at the club, but he missed the first three Challenge Cup Finals (in 1984, 1985 and 1988) due to injury.

After being released by Wigan in 1993, he went to play for Halifax, Salford Reds and Widnes Vikings.

=== Representative career ===
Hampson received his first call-up for Great Britain in 1986. He was selected to go on the 1988 Great Britain Lions tour, but was forced to withdraw after breaking his arm a few weeks before the tour departed. He was also selected for the 1992 Great Britain Lions tour of Australia and New Zealand. He was capped 12 times for Great Britain between 1987 and 1992.

== Coaching career ==
Hampson was coach of Lancashire Lynx between 1998 and 2000. He worked as a personal trainer for other sportsmen such as cricketer Andrew Flintoff and golfer Darren Clarke.

He has worked as a fitness conditioner for Sale Sharks, Lancashire CCC, and in rugby league at international level with Great Britain.

As part of the 2010 Wigan Warriors coaching staff re-structure Hampson became the Assistant Under 18's Coach.

== Honours ==
Wigan

- Championship (5): 1986–87, 1989–90, 1990–91, 1991–92, 1992–93,
- Challenge Cup (5): 1988–89, 1989–90, 1990–91, 1991–92, 1992–93
- World Club Challenge (2): 1987, 1991
- Lancashire Cup (5): 1985–86, 1986–87, 1987–88, 1988–89, 1992–93
- Premiership (2): 1986–87, 1991–92
- John Player Special / Regal Trophy (4): 1985–86, 1986–87, 1988–89, 1992–93
