= Darren Bloor =

British rugby league footballer

Personal information
- Born: 5 February 1963 (age 62) Oldham, England

Playing information
- Position: Scrum-half
Club
Years	Team	Pld	T	G	FG	P
1983–88	Salford	142	46	0	4	188
1988–89	St Helens	27	7	0	1	29
1989	Swinton	7	0	0	0	0
1990	Salford	1	0	0	0	0
	Total	177	53	0	5	217

Darren Bloor (born 5 February 1963) is an English former rugby league footballer who played as a scrum-half in the 1980s and 1990s. He spent most of his professional career with Salford, but also played for St Helens and Swinton.

== Playing career ==
Born in Oldham, Bloor played rugby league in his hometown for Oldham St Annes, and also represented Great Britain at amateur level. He turned professional in August 1983, signing with Salford. He established himself as the club's first choice scrum-half during the 1984–85 season, and went on to make almost 150 appearances for the club.

He scored 14 tries in the 1985–86 season, impressing enough to earn a call-up to the 29-man Great Britain training squad in preparation for the upcoming 1986 Kangaroo tour. Despite a strong performance in a trial game, he was ultimately not selected for any games in the Test series against Australia.

In 1987–88, he helped Salford reach the Challenge Cup semi-final, but was set to miss the game due to suspension. The ban was later successfully appealed, but he could not prevent the team's defeat to Wigan at Burnden Park.

In October 1988, Bloor was transferred to St Helens for a fee of £75,000, and made a try-scoring debut against Wakefield Trinity a couple of days later. He made his final appearance for the club in the 1989 Challenge Cup final at Wembley, coming off the bench in a 0–27 defeat against Wigan.

Bloor moved to Swinton the following season, before returning to his former club Salford a few months later. In April 1991, Bloor was diagnosed with cancer. Although the disease went into remission after treatment, he did not return to playing rugby league.
