= Shaun Allen =

English rugby league footballer

Personal information
- Full name: Shaun Allen
- Born: 23 September 1965 (age 60) England

Playing information
- Position: Fullback, Wing, Centre, Hooker, Second-row, Loose forward
Club
Years	Team	Pld	T	G	FG	P
1983–88	St. Helens	145	18	0	0	72
1989–91	Oldham	51	7	0	0	28
1992–93	Blackpool Gladiators	15	0	0	0	0
	Total	211	25	0	0	100
Representative
Years	Team	Pld	T	G	FG	P
1984	Great Britain U-21s	1

Shaun Allen (born 23 September 1965) is an English former professional rugby league footballer who played in the 1980s and 1990s. He played at representative level for Great Britain (Under-21s in 1984), and at club level for played for St. Helens and Oldham, as a fullback, wing, centre, hooker, second-row, or loose forward, and consequently he was considered a utility player.

== Playing career ==
=== St Helens ===
Allen played right-centre in St Helens' 28–16 victory over Wigan in the 1984 Lancashire Cup Final during the 1984–85 season at Central Park, Wigan on Sunday 28 October 1984.

=== Oldham ===
Allen signed for Oldham on loan in March 1989. He joined the club on a permanent deal two months later for a transfer fee of £10,000.

He played right-centre in Oldham's 16–24 defeat by Warrington in the 1989 Lancashire Cup Final during the 1989–90 season at Knowsley Road, St. Helens on Saturday 14 October 1989.
