= Mark Preston (rugby) =

English rugby player (born 1967)

Personal information
- Born: 4 April 1967 (age 59) Lytham St Annes, Lancashire, England

Playing information

Rugby union
- Position: Wing
Club
Years	Team	Pld	T	G	FG	P
	Preston Grasshoppers
	Fylde RFC
	Total	0	0	0	0	0
Representative
Years	Team	Pld	T	G	FG	P
1988	England B	1

Rugby league
- Position: Wing
Club
Years	Team	Pld	T	G	FG	P
1988–91	Wigan	84	57	0	0	228
1991–96	Halifax	135	90	0	0	360
1996	Widnes	8	4	0	0	16
	Total	227	151	0	0	604
Representative
Years	Team	Pld	T	G	FG	P
1988–89	Lancashire	2	1	0	0	4

Mark Preston (born 3 April 1967) is an English former rugby league and rugby union footballer who played as a winger. He started his career with Fylde RFC in rugby union, and represented England B. He switched to rugby league in 1988, where he played for Wigan, Halifax and Widnes, and also represented Lancashire.

== Early life ==
Preston was born in Lytham St Annes, Lancashire. He attended Kirkham Grammar School, where he began playing rugby union.

== Playing career ==
=== Rugby union ===
After leaving school, Preston continued playing rugby union with Preston Grasshoppers before later joining Fylde RFC. He was the country's leading try scorer during the 1987–88 season, and received a call up for the England B team, scoring a try in a 35–9 win against Italy B at Welford Road, Leicester on 4 March 1988. A few days later he switched codes to rugby league, signing a contract with Wigan.

=== Rugby league ===
Preston made his debut for Wigan on 1 April 1988 in a 10–9 win against local rivals St Helens, and scored his first try for the club a few days later in a 42–16 victory against Swinton. Later that month, he scored five tries in a 62–10 win against Hunslet.

Preston's best season for Wigan came in the 1989–90 season. He was the club's top try scorer with 32 tries in 41 appearances, helping the club win the league championship that season. He also played for Wigan in the 1989–90 Regal Trophy final victory against Halifax, and scored two tries in the club's 36–14 win against Warrington in the 1990 Challenge Cup final.

In June 1991, he was transferred to Halifax for a fee of £50,000.
