= Nicky Kiss =

GB international rugby league footballer

Playing information
- Position: Hooker
Club
Years	Team	Pld	T	G	FG	P
1978–89	Wigan	259	36	1	0	146
Representative
Years	Team	Pld	T	G	FG	P
1981–88	Lancashire	5	0	0	0	0
1985	Great Britain	1	0	0	0	0

Nicky Kiss is a former professional rugby league footballer who played in the 1970s and 1980s. He played at representative level for Great Britain, and at club level for Wigan, as a hooker.

== Background ==
Kiss is the son of Hungarian parents, who fled to England after the Hungarian Uprising in 1956.

== Playing career ==
Kiss joined Wigan from junior club Saddleworth Rangers in December 1977.

Kiss played hooker in Wigan's 15–4 victory over Leeds in the 1982–83 John Player Special Trophy Final during the 1982–83 season at Elland Road, Leeds on Saturday 22 January 1983.

Unhappy with Wigan coach Alex Murphy's decision to sign another hooker, Howie Tamati, Kiss requested to be placed on the transfer list in September 1983. He eventually quit the club altogether, but settled his differences with Wigan following Murphy's departure at the beginning of the following season.

During the 1984–85 season, Kiss played hooker, and scored a try in Wigan's 18–26 defeat by St Helens in the 1984 Lancashire Cup Final at Central Park, Wigan on Sunday 28 October 1984, and played hooker for Wigan in the 28-24 victory over Hull F.C. in the 1985 Challenge Cup Final at Wembley Stadium, London on Saturday 4 May 1985.

Kiss played hooker in Wigan's 14–8 victory over New Zealand in the 1985 New Zealand rugby league tour of Great Britain and France match at Central Park, Wigan on Sunday 6 October 1985.

In the 1985–86 season, Kiss played hooker, and scored a try in the 34–8 victory over Warrington in the 1985 Lancashire Cup Final at Knowsley Road, St Helens, on Sunday 13 October 1985, and played in the 18–4 victory over Hull Kingston Rovers in the 1985–86 John Player Special Trophy Final at Elland Road, Leeds on Saturday 11 January 1986.

Kiss played in Wigan's victories in the Championship during the 1986–87 season, and also played hooker in Wigan's 8–0 victory over Warrington in the 1986–87 Premiership Final at Old Trafford, Manchester on Sunday 17 May 1987.

Kiss played hooker in Wigan's 8–2 victory over Manly-Warringah Sea Eagles in the 1987 World Club Challenge at Central Park, Wigan on Wednesday 7 October 1987.

During the 1987–88 season, Kiss played hooker in the 28–16 victory over Warrington in the 1987 Lancashire Cup Final at Knowsley Road, St. Helens, on Sunday 11 October 1987, and played in the 32–12 victory over Halifax in the 1988 Challenge Cup Final at Wembley Stadium, London on Saturday 30 April 1988.

He played in the 27–0 victory over St. Helens, and in the 1989 Challenge Cup Final during the 1988–89 season at Wembley Stadium, London on Saturday 29 April 1989.

Kiss was rewarded for 10 years of service with a Testimonial match at Wigan that took place in 1988, kicking a late conversion - the only goal of his career.

Kiss suffered a bad arm injury shortly after the start of the 1989-90 season, which coupled with a car accident, led him to miss the rest of the year. In September 1990, he announced his retirement on medical advice.

=== International honours ===
Kiss won a cap for Great Britain while at Wigan in 1985 against France.
