= Ronnie Duane =

GB international rugby league footballer

Personal information
- Full name: Ronald Duane
- Born: 31 May 1963 (age 63) Newton-le-Willows, Merseyside, England

Playing information
- Position: Centre, Second-row
Club
Years	Team	Pld	T	G	FG	P
1981–90	Warrington	173	51	28	0	246
1990–91	Oldham	21	1	0	0	4
1991–92	Rochdale Hornets	25	7	0	0	28
1992–93	Swinton Lions	17	2	0	0	8
	Total	236	61	28	0	286
Representative
Years	Team	Pld	T	G	FG	P
1983–84	Great Britain	3	1	0	0	4
1986	Lancashire	1	0	0	0	0

Ronald "Ronnie" Duane (born 31 May 1963), also known by the nickname of "Rhino", is an English former professional rugby league footballer who played in the 1980s and 1990s. He played at representative level for Great Britain, and at club level for Warrington, Oldham and Rochdale Hornets as a centre, or second-row.

== Background ==
Ronnie Duane's birth was registered in Newton, St. Helens, Lancashire, England.

== Playing career ==
=== Warrington ===
Born in Warrington, Duane joined his hometown club from Woolston Rovers in April 1981. He made his debut for Warrington in October 1981 against Hull.

Duane played centre in Warrington's 16–0 victory over St Helens in the 1982 Lancashire Cup Final during the 1982–83 season at Central Park, Wigan on Saturday 23 October 1982, and played as a substitute, replacing Second-row Gary Sanderson, in the 24–16 victory over Oldham in the 1989 Lancashire Cup Final during the 1989–90 season at Knowsley Road, St. Helens on Saturday 14 October 1989,

Duane played as a substitute, replacing Scrum-half Steve Peters, in the 4–18 defeat by Wigan in the 1986–87 John Player Special Trophy Final during the 1986–87 season at Central Park, Wigan on Saturday 10 January 1987.

In 2011, Duane was inducted into Warrington's Hall of Fame.

=== Later career ===
In July 1990, Duane was signed by Oldham for an undisclosed fee.

In August 1991, Duane and Oldham teammate Brett Clark were sold to Rochdale Hornets in exchange for Neil Holding.

Duane played and scored a try in Rochdale Hornets 14–24 defeat by St Helens in the 1991–92 Lancashire Cup Final during the 1991–92 season at Wilderspool Stadium, Warrington, on Sunday 20 October 1991.

He finished his playing career with Swinton, where he was appointed as club captain.

=== International honours ===
Ronnie Duane won caps for Great Britain while at Warrington in 1983 against France (2 matches), and in 1984 against France, he played in Great Britain's 40-13 victory over Northern Territory during the 1984 Great Britain Lions tour at Darwin, Northern Territory, his tour lasted nine minutes before he was injured with torn knee-ligaments.

== Personal life ==
Ronnie Duane is the younger brother of the rugby league centre who played in the 1980s for Warrington, Rochdale Hornets and Springfield Borough; Ian Duane.
