= Joe Lydon (rugby) =

GB international rugby league footballer and rugby union coach/administrator (born 1963)

Personal information
- Full name: Joseph Paul Lydon
- Born: 26 November 1963 (age 62) Wigan, Lancashire, England

Playing information
- Position: Fullback, Wing, Centre, Stand-off
Club
Years	Team	Pld	T	G	FG	P
1982–86	Widnes	99	54	116	1	435
1986–94	Wigan	262	89	283	16	938
1987	→ Eastern Suburbs	12	6	5	0	34
1989	→ Eastern Suburbs	10	2	9	0	26
	Total	383	151	413	17	1433
Representative
Years	Team	Pld	T	G	FG	P
1983	Great Britain U-24	3	1	12	0	28
1983–92	Great Britain	30	7	26	0	79
1985–88	Lancashire	4	1	1	0	6

Joseph Paul Lydon (born 26 November 1963) is an English former professional rugby league footballer, rugby union coach, and manager in both sports. He played during the 1980s and 1990s as a fullback, wing, centre, or stand-off for Widnes, Wigan and Eastern Suburbs. He also represented Lancashire, and won 30 caps for Great Britain.

He has coached rugby union for England under-19's, and England Sevens and was a backs coach for the senior England team between 2004 and 2006. Since 2008, he has held several player development roles in the Welsh Rugby Union (WRU), Rugby Football Union (RFU) and Irish Rugby Football Union (IRFU).

== Early life ==
Lydon was born in Wigan, Lancashire, England, and attended St John Rigby College. He played both rugby union and rugby league during his childhood. He played junior rugby league for Wigan St Patricks, and played for Wigan schoolboys at Wembley Stadium in the curtain-raiser to the 1975 Challenge Cup final. In rugby union, he was part of the England under-19's squad that toured Zimbabwe in 1982. After leaving school, Lydon chose to pursue a professional career in rugby league.

== Playing career ==
=== Widnes ===
Lydon signed professional forms with Widnes, making his début for the "Chemics" in a 9–10 defeat by Leigh in August 1982. On 23 November 1982, Lydon had his first taste of international football when playing in the centres for Widnes at Naughton Park in their 19–6 loss to Australia who were on their undefeated 1982 Kangaroo tour.

Lydon played on the wing, scoring a try and two conversions in Widnes' 8–12 defeat by Barrow in the 1983 Lancashire Cup Final during the 1983–84 season at Central Park, Wigan on Saturday 1 October 1983.

Lydon played at centre and scored a try in Widnes' 10–18 defeat by Leeds in the 1983–84 John Player Special Trophy Final during the 1983–84 season at Central Park, Wigan on Saturday 14 January 1984

In 1984, he won the Lance Todd Trophy as man of the match in Widnes' Wembley win over hometown Wigan in the 1984 Challenge Cup Final, famously scoring two 75-yard interception tries. He also won the Man of Steel, Division One Player and Young Player of the Year awards.

=== Wigan ===
In 1986, when he joined Wigan, Lydon became rugby league's first £100,000 transfer (based on increases in average earnings, this would be approximately £327,600 in 2013), making his début in a 44–6 win over Hull in March 1986. One of his first games for the Cherry and Whites was against the touring 1986 Australian Kangaroos, when he scored a second half try in Wigan's 26–18 defeat by Australia. He played in the centres for defending champions Wigan in their 1987 World Club Challenge victory against the visiting Manly-Warringah Sea Eagles at Central Park. During the game, Manly second rower "Rambo" Ron Gibbs became the first player sent off in a World Club Challenge after a high tackle on Lydon. Later in the game after being tackled by Dale Shearer, the Manly fullback appeared to step on Lydon's head after he had got the ball away to teammate David Stephenson.

In March 1989, Lydon scored a 61-yard drop goal in Wigan's 13–6 win against Warrington in the 1989 Challenge Cup semi-final at Maine Road, setting a world record for the longest successful drop kick in rugby league.

During his time at Wigan, Lydon helped the club win six league championships and five Challenge Cup finals. He was also on the winning side in four Lancashire Cup finals (in 1986, 1987, 1988 and 1992), four John Player Special/Regal Trophy finals (in 1986–87, 1988–89, 1989–90 and 1992–93) and three Premiership finals (in 1987, 1992 and 1994).

In November 1994, he played the last of 262 games for Wigan as a substitute in a 30–6 home win over Featherstone Rovers.

=== Australia ===
During his career Lydon spent two English off-seasons playing in Australia for Sydney's Eastern Suburbs club in 1987 and 1989. His first stint at the Roosters was somewhat successful as Easts made it to the Preliminary final before going down to eventual Grand Finalists Canberra. His second stint with the Bondi-based club was less successful as Easts finished in 11th place in 1989. Overall Lydon played 22 games for Easts, scoring 8 tries and kicking 14 goals.

=== International career ===
In 1983 he made the first of three appearances for the Great Britain Under-24 team against France in January and a month later makes his full Great Britain début, scoring a try and three goals in 20–5 win over France in Carcassonne.

In 1984, Lydon was selected to go on the 1984 Great Britain Lions tour of Australia, New Zealand and Papua New Guinea. Lydon played in 14 games on the tour including 4 tests. He scored 4 tries and kicked 26 goals, scoring 68 points.

Joe Lydon's second half try in the First Ashes series test against Australia during the Kangaroos 1986 Kangaroo tour at Old Trafford created history as he became the first Great Britain fullback to score a try in an Ashes series test match.

Lydon was selected to go on the 1988 Great Britain Lions tour, but his invitation was withdrawn after Lydon allegedly assaulted a spectator.

After only playing the 3rd test against New Zealand in 1989, Lydon was selected to go on the 1990 Great Britain Lions tour to Papua New Guinea and New Zealand. Not selected for the two tests against Papua New Guinea, he then played all three tests against New Zealand as Great Britain wrapped up the series 2–1.

Injury would keep Lydon from playing for Great Britain against the touring Australians in 1990 and he would not return to the international arena until selected to go on the 1992 Great Britain Lions tour of Papua New Guinea, Australia and New Zealand, during which he collected the last of his 30 GB caps as a substitute in Britain's 16–10 defeat by Australia at Lang Park in Brisbane during the third test. Unfortunately for Lydon and British football, after the Lions had convincingly won the 2nd test 33–10 in Melbourne to send the series into a third test decider, Australia continued its Ashes dominance winning the series 2–1.

Lydon made one last appearance for Great Britain, as fullback in their 10–6 loss to Australia in the 1992 Rugby League World Cup Final at Wembley on 24 October. Lydon sprained his ankle at the end of Britain's first set from the kick-off when thrown the ball for the 5th tackle kick, he slipped and was forced to pass off to halfback Deryck Fox. Lydon bravely played showing some discomfort until replaced at half time by Leeds former Scottish rugby union centre turned rugby league fullback Alan Tait. Lydon had not even expected to play at Wembley, but was called into the squad by coach Malcolm Reilly after the original choice Graham Steadman had been injured at the teams final training run just 2 days before the game.

He would go on to make one further international appearance, coming on as a replacement for Ireland in their first ever international match, a 24–22 victory against USA in Washington DC in 1995.

== After playing ==
Lydon worked as an expert analyst for the BBC alongside former England and Great Britain dual-rugby international Ray French during the 1995 Rugby League World Cup, which was held in England.

After retiring as a player, Lydon became the team manager of Wigan – a position he held until 1996. In 1997 Lydon was appointed the RFL's first-ever technical director, a post he held until resigning in 2000 when he was appointed manager of the England under-19 rugby union side. He was appointed England Sevens coach in October 2001. In June 2004, he was appointed backs coach for the England rugby union team. In May 2006, after being removed as England backs coach, Lydon turned down the opportunity to join the RFU Academy.

In July 2007 he began working with Waterloo rugby union club as performance consultant. In August 2007 he was invited to the rugby league Challenge Cup Final at Wembley Stadium as a guest of honour.

On 24 October 2007, Lydon returned to the Wigan Warriors club as part of the takeover by Ian Lenagan, and became chief executive of the holding company.

In November 2008, Lydon was appointed Welsh Rugby Union Head of Rugby Performance & Development. In May 2013, he was named Head of International Player Development by the RFU. He stepped down from the role in 2016. In 2017, he was appointed by the Irish Rugby Football Union as head of international talent ID and development.

== Superstars ==
Joe Lydon participated in the televised all-around sports competition Superstars, finishing second in the 1985 Series.

== Player Awards ==
Only four players have won the Lance Todd Trophy, Harry Sunderland Trophy, and the Man of Steel Award, they are; George Nicholls, Joe Lydon Paul Wellens, and Bevan French. Harry Sunderland Trophy became the Rob Burrow Award.

Achievements
Preceded by Ellery Hanley	Rugby league transfer record Widnes to Wigan; 1986–1987	Succeeded by Andy Gregory
