= Des Drummond =

GB & England international rugby league footballer (1958–2022)

Personal information
- Full name: Desmond Lloyd Drummond
- Born: 17 June 1958 Savanna-la-Mar, Westmoreland, Jamaica
- Died: 29 January 2022 (aged 63)

Playing information
- Height: 5 ft 7 in (1.70 m)
- Weight: 12 st 0 lb (76 kg)
- Position: Wing
Club
Years	Team	Pld	T	G	FG	P
1976–86	Leigh	280	141	2	0	470
1986	Western Suburbs	9	2	0	0	8
1987–92	Warrington	182	69	0	0	276
1992–93	Bramley R.L.F.C.	4	0	0	0	0
1993–95	Workington Town	71	32	0	0	128
1996	Chorley Chieftains	11	3	0	0	12
1997	Prescot Panthers	4	1	0	0	4
1997	Barrow	11	4	0	0	16
	Total	572	252	2	0	914
Representative
Years	Team	Pld	T	G	FG	P
1980–84	England	5	1	0	0	3
1980–88	Great Britain	24	8	0	0	28
1981–87	Lancashire	4	3	0	0	12
1984	GB tour games	10	9	0	0	36

Desmond Lloyd Drummond (17 June 1958 – 29 January 2022) was an England and Great Britain international rugby league footballer who played on the wing in the 1970s, 1980s and 1990s.

== Background ==
Drummond was born on 17 June 1958 in Savanna-la-Mar, Westmoreland, Jamaica, and was of English-Jamaican descent.

During his youth he grew up in North West England and made Bolton his adopted hometown.

== Career ==
=== Leigh ===
Drummond won 24 Great Britain caps, the first against New Zealand in 1980, the last against France in 1988. He signed for Leigh almost by accident, having travelled to watch his older brother Alva Drummond play for the reserve team. Leigh found themselves a player short due to injury, and he was persuaded to play. He made such an impact that he was offered a professional contract within the week. He quickly became a star player at the Lancashire club, particularly after a series of televised appearances during the run to Leigh's 4-12 defeat by Castleford in the 1976 BBC2 Floodlit Trophy Final at Hilton Park, Leigh on Tuesday 14 December 1976.

The arrival of Alex Murphy as coach in 1980 marked an upturn in fortunes for the club. Drummond played right wing in Leigh's 8–3 victory over Widnes in the 1981 Lancashire Cup Final at Central Park, Wigan on Saturday 26 September 1981. Then, as the weather-disrupted season reached its end, Leigh needed only to defeat already-relegated Whitehaven to win their first league title since 1907. Despite trailing at half-time, he scored a try in a second half revival which made the unfashionable Lancashire club the National Champions, with 26-tries he was the top-try scorer in the Championship during the 1981–82 season. Within three years, however, Leigh found themselves in a more familiar relegation battle, and were severely hampered when he badly broke an ankle in an away fixture against Barrow. Although he recovered to return to the Great Britain team, he lost a little of his devastating speed. Even so, he recovered enough to score the BBC TV 'Try of the season' as a losing semi-finalist for Leigh against Leeds in the 1985 John Player Special Trophy semi-final. He left Leigh to join Warrington in 1987. He scored 141 tries in his 280 appearances for Leigh.

=== Warrington ===
Drummond played his first game for Warrington on Sunday 8 February 1987. He also scored Warrington's Try of The Season in the 1987–88 season against St. Helens, (he was also the team's top try scorer for that season). Drummond was left out of the squad for the 1988 Great Britain Lions tour of Australasia after defending himself from a spectator who rushed onto the pitch shouting racial abuse. He again scored Warrington's Try of the Season in the 1988–89 season against Hull Kingston Rovers. He played right wing in Warrington's 16–28 defeat by Wigan in the 1987 Lancashire Cup Final at Knowsley Road, St. Helens on Sunday 11 October 1987, played right wing in the 24–16 victory over Oldham in the 1989 Lancashire Cup Final at Knowsley Road on Saturday 14 October 1989, played right wing in the 14-36 defeat by Wigan in the 1990 Challenge Cup Final at Wembley Stadium, London on Saturday 28 April 1990, in front of a crowd of 77,729, and played, and was captain in the 12-2 victory over Bradford Northern in the 1990–91 Regal Trophy Final at Headingley Rugby Stadium, Leeds on Saturday 12 January 1991. He played his last game for Warrington and he finished his 182-game career on 26 April 1992, having scored 69 tries.

=== Later career ===
Drummond then enjoyed an Indian summer at Workington Town, where he returned to Old Trafford twice in the Divisional Premiership, losing to Featherstone Rovers in 1993 and beating London Crusaders in 1994, he scored try from a Tony Kay assist. In the 1994–95 season, he helped Town to a credible ninth position out of 16 teams. In the 1995 Challenge Cup, Workington Town reached the quarter-finals, beating Drummond's old club, Leigh along the way 94–4. He announced his retirement at the end of the season, but was persuaded to come out of retirement a year later, and went on to play for Chorley and Barrow.

== Honours ==
=== Club ===
Leigh

- Rugby Football League Championship First Division
  - 1981–82 Rugby Football League season
- Rugby league county cups
  - 1981–82 Lancashire Cup
- Open Rugby World XIII: September 1981, February 1982, October 1982

== Outside rugby league ==
Drummond's rise to celebrity status was precipitated by his performances in the televised all-around sports competition Superstars, finishing second in the 1983 Series final, and clocking a world competition record 10.85 seconds for the 100 metres (noted Great Britain rugby league speedster Martin Offiah was reported to have recorded a hand held 10.8 seconds for the 100, showing just how fast Drummond was).

An exceptional power-lifter and all-round athlete, Drummond's 'party trick' in the competition came in the assault course competition, which began with three hurdles, a vaulting horse and an 8-foot wall. Drummond took the hurdles in his stride, hurdled the vaulting horse, and would leap to the top of the wall without using the scrambling rope. He competed in the international event, but was hampered by a change in the scoring – whereas in the UK, points were awarded in the lifting events for performance against bodyweight, in the international competition the spoils were divided for the dead weight lifted, a disadvantage to the 5'7", 12 stone rugby man.

=== Retirement and death ===
After finally retiring from the professional game, Drummond took up an amateur role as coach to the Bolton rugby league club. He died on 29 January 2022, at the age of 63.
