= Paul Bishop (rugby league) =

Australian rugby league footballer

Personal information
- Born: 5 July 1967 (age 59) England

Playing information
- Position: Scrum-half
Club
Years	Team	Pld	T	G	FG	P
1984–90	Warrington	113	38	183	42	560
1988–89	→ Cronulla Sharks	13	2	0	0	8
1990–92	St Helens	51	16	70	11	215
1991	→ Gold Coast Seagulls	3	0	0	0	0
1992–94	Halifax	56	14	157	7	377
	Total	236	70	410	60	1160
Representative
Years	Team	Pld	T	G	FG	P
1987	Great Britain U-21	2	0	1	0	2
- Father: Tommy Bishop

Paul Bishop (born 5 July 1967) is an English former professional rugby league footballer who played for Warrington, Cronulla-Sutherland Sharks, St Helens, Gold Coast Seagulls and Halifax.

== Early life ==
Born in England, Bishop moved to Australia at an early age when his father, Tommy Bishop, signed for Cronulla Sharks in 1969. When his father returned to England in the early 1980s, Bishop played junior rugby league for Thatto Heath. On his 17th birthday, he was signed by Warrington.

== Playing career ==
=== Warrington ===
Bishop made his debut for Warrington in October 1984, scoring a try and kicking seven goals in a 42–30 win against Workington Town.

On 11 May 1986, in the semi-final of the 1985–86 Rugby League Premiership, Bishop scored a record-equalling five drop goals in a 23–10 win against Wigan. A week later in the final, he scored a try and five conversions in a 38–10 win against Halifax. He also played in the 1986–87 Rugby League Premiership final the following year, but were this time defeated by Wigan.

He then spent parts of the next two seasons in Australia, making 13 first grade appearances for Cronulla Sharks in the 1988 and 1989 NSWRL seasons.

Bishop played at scrum-half for Warrington in the 1990 Challenge Cup final, but the team were defeated 14–36 by Wigan. He made his final appearance for the club in October 1990.

=== St Helens ===
Bishop joined St Helens in 1990. He played in the Challenge Cup for the second consecutive year in 1991, but was once again a losing finalist against Wigan.

In the following season, Bishop played in the 1991–92 Lancashire Cup final, scoring a try and two goals in a 24–14 win against Rochdale Hornets.

=== Halifax ===
In 1992, Bishop was signed by Halifax. Bishop left the club in 1994 and returned to Australia.
