= Gary Sanderson =

English rugby league footballer

Personal information
- Born: 21 February 1967 (age 58); St Helens, Lancashire

Playing information
- Position: Second-row
Club
Years	Team	Pld	T	G	FG	P
1986–95	Warrington	236	14	0	0	56
Representative
Years	Team	Pld	T	G	FG	P
1987–88	Great Britain U21	4	0	0	0	0

Gary Sanderson (born 21 February 1967) is a former professional rugby league footballer who played in the 1980s and 1990s. He played at club level for Warrington as a second-row.

== Playing career ==
Sanderson played in Warrington's 38–10 victory over Halifax in 1985–86 Rugby League Premiership during the 1985–86 season at Elland Road, Leeds on Sunday 18 May 1986.

Sanderson played left-second-row in Warrington's 4–18 defeat by Wigan in the 1986–87 John Player Special Trophy Final during the 1986–87 season at Burnden Park, Bolton on Saturday 10 January 1987, in front of a crowd of 22,144,

Sanderson played left-second-row in Warrington's 16–28 defeat by Wigan in the 1987 Lancashire Cup Final during the 1987–88 season at Knowsley Road, St. Helens on Sunday 11 October 1987, in front of a crowd of 20,237.

During the 1989–90 season, Sanderson played right-second-row (replaced by substitute Ronnie Duane on 65-minutes) in the 24–16 victory over Oldham in the 1989 Lancashire Cup Final at Knowsley Road, St. Helens on Saturday 14 October 1989, in front of a crowd of 9,990. He also played right-second-row in Warrington's 14–36 defeat by Wigan in the 1990 Challenge Cup Final at Wembley Stadium, London on Saturday 28 April 1990, in front of a crowd of 77,729.

Sanderson appeared as a substitute (replacing Paul Darbyshire on 18-minutes) in the 10–40 defeat by Wigan in the 1994–95 Regal Trophy Final during the 1994–95 season at Alfred McAlpine Stadium, Huddersfield on Saturday 28 January 1995, in front of a crowd of 19,636.

He played his final game for the club in the semi-final of the 1994–95 Rugby League Premiership against Wigan. He announced his retirement in 1996 on medical advice due to a series of neck injuries during his playing career.

In 2019, Sanderson was inducted into Warrington's Hall of Fame.
