= Gary Connolly =

Great Britain, England, and Ireland international dual code rugby footballer

Personal information
- Full name: Gary John Connolly
- Born: 22 June 1971 (age 55) St Helens, Lancashire, England

Playing information
- Height: 183 cm (6 ft 0 in)
- Weight: 89 kg (14 st 0 lb)

Rugby league
- Position: Fullback, Centre
Club
Years	Team	Pld	T	G	FG	P
1989–93	St Helens	133	46	0	0	184
1993	Canterbury Bulldogs	15	5	0	0	20
1993–02	Wigan	309	136	6	0	556
2003–04	Leeds Rhinos	33	8	0	0	32
2004	Wigan Warriors	17	1	0	0	4
2005	Widnes Vikings	21	4	1	0	18
	Total	528	200	7	0	814
Representative
Years	Team	Pld	T	G	FG	P
1991–03	Great Britain	31	1	0	0	4
1992–96	England	4	3	0	0	12
1997	Rest of the World	1	0	0	0	0
1998	Ireland	1	0	0	0	0
2001–03	Lancashire	2	0	0	0	0

Rugby union
- Position: Centre
Club
Years	Team	Pld	T	G	FG	P
1996–97	Harlequins	13	8	0	0	40
2001–03	Orrell	7	5	0	0	35
2005–06	Munster	14	2	0	0	10
	Total	34	15	0	0	85

Gary John Connolly (born 22 June 1971) is an English former professional rugby league and rugby union footballer.

He spent most of his career in rugby league, playing in the 1980s, 1990s and 2000s as a fullback and centre for St Helens, Canterbury Bulldogs, Wigan Warriors, Leeds Rhinos and for the Great Britain national team. He also played rugby union for Harlequins, Orrell and Munster.

== Rugby league career ==
=== St Helens ===
Connolly was born in St Helens, England, and played rugby league for Blackbrook during his youth. He started his professional career with his hometown club, St Helens, making his debut in January 1989 against Hull Kingston Rovers. At 17 years old, he started at fullback in St Helens' 0–27 defeat by their arch rivals Wigan at Wembley Stadium in the 1989 Challenge Cup final on the back of some impressive performances. It was the first time in Challenge Cup Final history at Wembley that a team had been held scoreless.

Connolly was initially signed to play at fullback, but was used as a centre by Saints coach Mike McClennan, a position he would continue to play for the majority of his career. He won his first silverware during the 1991–92 season, playing at centre in St Helens' 24–14 victory over Rochdale Hornets in the 1991 Lancashire Cup Final at Wilderspool Stadium, Warrington, on Sunday 20 October 1991.

During the 1992–93 season, Connolly played at centre in the 4–5 defeat by Wigan in the 1992 Lancashire Cup Final at Knowsley Road, St. Helens, on Sunday 18 October 1992. St Helens also reached the 1993 Premiership final at Old Trafford, and this time defeated Wigan, with Connolly scoring a try in the 10–4 win.

Connolly then played 15 games of the 1993 NSWRL season with Sydney club Canterbury-Bankstown, helping them become minor premiers that year. While with the Bulldogs, Connolly played mostly in the centres and crossed for five tries, including two on debut against South Sydney. While Connolly was a star import for the Bulldogs, his worst game came when Brisbane Broncos international centre Steve Renouf scored 4 tries against him in their game at the ANZ Stadium.

While still at Canterbury, St Helens accepted a £250,000 bid for Connolly from rivals Wigan in July 1993. His move was a controversial one, and many St Helens followers labelled him 'Judas'.

=== Wigan ===
Connolly was a member of the successful Wigan team of the mid-1990s. After the 1993–94 Rugby Football League season he travelled with defending champions Wigan to Brisbane for the 1994 World Club Challenge, as a fullback in their 20–14 win over Australian premiers the Brisbane Broncos at the ANZ Stadium in front of a World Club Challenge record attendance of 54,220.

Gary Connolly played left-centre in Wigan's 2–33 defeat by Castleford in the 1993–94 Regal Trophy Final during the 1993–94 season at Elland Road, Leeds on Saturday 22 January 1994, played left-centre and scored a try in the 40–10 victory over Warrington in the 1994–95 Regal Trophy Final during the 1994–95 season at Alfred McAlpine Stadium, Huddersfield on Saturday 28 January 1995, and played fullback in the 25–16 victory over St Helens in the 1995–96 Regal Trophy Final during the 1994–95 season at Alfred McAlpine Stadium, Huddersfield on Saturday 13 January 1996.

In May 1996, Connolly was one of a number of Wigan's players to appear in both games of the two-match cross-code challenge series against Bath. He was named in the Super League Dream Team of the 1996 at fullback.

Connolly played for Wigan at centre in their 1998 Super League Grand Final victory against Leeds Rhinos. He signed a new three-year contract with the club at the end of the season.

He was named in the 1999 season's Super League Dream Team at centre. Connolly played for the Wigan Warriors at centre in their 2001 Super League Grand Final loss against the Bradford Bulls.

In his final season at the club, he won the 2002 Challenge Cup with Wigan, scoring a try in the 21–12 win against St Helens.

=== Later career ===
After a brief stint in rugby union, Connolly returned to rugby league with Leeds Rhinos in 2003. He played in the 2003 Challenge Cup Final against Bradford Bulls, and was awarded the Lance Todd Trophy despite being on the losing side.

In 2004, Connolly was released by Leeds, and returned for a short spell at Wigan for whom he played 17 games during the 2004 season. Released at the end of the season, although given the option of a return to rugby union with Orrell, he instead signed a one-year deal with Widnes for the 2005 season.

=== International career ===
Gary Connolly made his international rugby league début for Great Britain against the touring Papua New Guinea team on 9 November 1991 at Central Park in Wigan. Connolly played from the bench as the Lions defeated the Kumuls 56–4.

He was later selected to go on the 1992 Great Britain Lions tour of Australia and New Zealand where he played from the bench in the final two Ashes Tests against Australia before moving to the centres for the tests against New Zealand. Later that year he was selected to play in the centres for Great Britain in their 6–10 defeat by Australia in the 1992 Rugby League World Cup Final at Wembley.

Connolly was selected to play for England in their 1995 World Cup campaign, but missed most of the tournament after contracting pneumonia. He recovered in time to be selected for the World Cup final at Wembley, though England would go down to defending champions Australia 8–16.

Connolly played a one-off international for a 'Rest of the World' team in their 8–28 loss against the Australian Rugby League's Kangaroos in mid-1997.

In 1998, he was called up by Ireland.

He scored his only try for Great Britain during the second Test of the 2003 Ashes Series, his 31st and final cap.

== Rugby union career ==
=== Harlequins and Orrell ===
In late 1995, rugby union became a professional game, allowing league players the opportunity to try their hand at the 15-a-side game. In the off-season following the completion of Super League I, a number of players from Super League clubs took the opportunity to sign short-term deals with clubs in the Courage League, the top flight of rugby union in England. Connolly was one of a number of players from Wigan to sign such a deal, which he did with London club Harlequins. Connolly played 13 games for Harlequins, scoring eight tries, and was regarded as the best of the short-term converts at the time.

In 2000, Connolly signed a new deal with Wigan that included the opportunity to play union for Orrell during the off-season. Connolly remained at the club for two years until he was released by Wigan and signed for Leeds Rhinos in 2002.

=== Munster ===
Following Widnes's relegation from the Super League in 2005, Connolly was released, and he signed a short-term deal to return to rugby union with Munster.
