= Mark Roberts (rugby league) =

Wales international rugby league footballer

Personal information
- Full name: Mark Roberts
- Born: 9 November 1982 (age 42)

Playing information
- Position: Second-row, Centre
Club
Years	Team	Pld	T	G	FG	P
2003	Wigan	3	0	0	0	0
2005–06	Oldham R.L.F.C.	31	3	0	0	12
2007–08	Halifax R.L.F.C.	1	0	0	0	0
2008	Leigh Centurions	1	0	0	0	0
2009–10	Halifax R.L.F.C.	5	2	0	0	8
	Total	41	5	0	0	20
Representative
Years	Team	Pld	T	G	FG	P
2007	Wales	1	0	0	0	0
- As of 7 February 2021

Mark Roberts (born 9 November 1982) is a former Wales international rugby league footballer who played in the 2000s and 2010s. He played at club level in the Super League for the Wigan Warriors (Heitage No. 952) (2003), and in League 1 for the Oldham Roughyeds (2005...2006), in the Co-operative Championship for Halifax (two spells, 2007 and 2009...2010), and the Leigh Centurions (2008), and the Blackpool Panthers (2010), as a centre, or second-row.

== Playing career ==
=== Club career ===
Mark Roberts made his début for the Wigan Warriors in 2003's Super League VIII as an interchange/substitute in the 24–22 victory over St. Helens at the JJB Stadium, Wigan on Friday 18 April 2003, and he played his last match for the Wigan Warriors as an interchange/substitute in the 22–18 victory over the Widnes Vikings at Halton Stadium, Widnes, on Saturday 10 May 2003.

=== International ===
Mark's one cap for Wales was in the 26–50 defeat to Lebanon on 9 Nov 2007 in Widnes; he was #15 on the interchange/substitute bench.
