= Mark Forster (rugby league) =

Great Britain and Ireland international rugby league footballer

Personal information
- Born: 25 November 1964 (age 60)

Playing information
- Position: Wing, Centre
Club
Years	Team	Pld	T	G	FG	P
1983–00	Warrington	458	191	3	0	769
2001	Widnes Vikings	17	3	0	0	12
	Total	475	194	3	0	781
Representative
Years	Team	Pld	T	G	FG	P
1986–89	Lancashire	2	0	0	0	0
1987	Great Britain	2	1	0	0	4
1997–01	Ireland	9	5	0	0	20
1985–86	Great Britain U21	3	1	0	0	4

Mark Forster (born 25 November 1964) is a former professional rugby league footballer who played in the 1980s, 1990s and 2000s. He played at representative level for Great Britain, Ireland and Lancashire, and at club level for the Warrington Wolves, and the Widnes Vikings, as a wing, or centre.

== Early life and education ==
Forster attended Richard Fairclough High School, now Sir Thomas Boteler Church of England High School.

== Playing career ==
=== Club career ===
Forster made his senior début for Warrington in 1983, and went on to score 191 tries in over 450 appearances for the club before being released in 2000. He finished his career with a single season at Widnes Vikings in 2001.

Forster appeared as a substitute (replacing Centre Phil Blake) in Warrington's 8-34 defeat by Wigan in the 1985 Lancashire Cup Final during the 1985–86 season at Knowsley Road, St. Helens, on Sunday 13 October 1985, played right-centre and scored two tries in the 16-28 defeat by Wigan in the 1987 Lancashire Cup Final during the 1987–88 season at Knowsley Road, St. Helens on Sunday 11 October 1987, and played left wing and scored a try in the 24-16 victory over Oldham in the 1989 Lancashire Cup Final during the 1989–90 season at Knowsley Road, St. Helens on Saturday 14 October 1989.

Forster played left-centre in Warrington's 14-36 defeat by Wigan in the 1990 Challenge Cup Final during the 1989–90 season at Wembley Stadium, London on Saturday 28 April 1990, in front of a crowd of 77,729.

Forster played left wing and scored a try in Warrington's 4-18 defeat by Wigan in the 1986–87 John Player Special Trophy Final during the 1986–87 season at Burnden Park, Bolton on Saturday 10 January 1987, and played right wing and scored two tries in the 10-40 defeat by Wigan in the 1994–95 Regal Trophy Final during the 1994–95 season at Alfred McAlpine Stadium, Huddersfield on Saturday 28 January 1995.

Forster's Testimonial matches at Warrington took place in 1993 and 2003.

Forster was inducted into the Warrington Hall of Fame in 2015.

=== Representative honours ===
Forster was a Great Britain international, and was capped twice in 1987. He also played for Ireland at the 2000 Rugby League World Cup.
