= Richard Russell (rugby league) =

England international rugby league footballer

Personal information
- Born: 24 November 1967 (age 58) Oldham, Lancashire, England

Playing information
- Position: Wing, Hooker
Club
Years	Team	Pld	T	G	FG	P
1985–89	Wigan	63	12	26	0	100
1989–93	Oldham	125	20			80
1993–98	Castleford Tigers	122	13	0	0	52
1999	Bramley	26	0	2	0	4
	Total	336	45	28	0	236
Representative
Years	Team	Pld	T	G	FG	P
1987–88	Great Britain U21	2
1995	England	1	0	0	0	0

Richard Russell (born 24 November 1967) is an English former professional rugby league footballer who played in the 1980s and 1990s. He played at representative level for England, and at club level for Wigan, Oldham and Castleford Tigers, as a wing, or hooker.

== Playing career ==
=== Wigan ===
Russell made his professional debut for Wigan in 1985. He was used by Wigan as a utility player.

He played on the wing in Wigan's 8–2 victory over Manly-Warringah Sea Eagles in the 1987 World Club Challenge at Central Park, Wigan on Wednesday 7 October 1987.

Russell played on the wing in Wigan's 28–16 victory Warrington in the 1987 Lancashire Cup Final during the 1987–88 season at Knowsley Road, St. Helens, on Sunday 11 October 1987.

=== Oldham ===
In July 1989, Russell was signed by his hometown club Oldham for an undisclosed fee. He was initially signed by the club to play as a loose forward, but was also used as a hooker, a role which would eventually become his preferred position.

He played as a substitute, (replacing Fullback Duncan Platt) in Oldham's 16–24 defeat by Warrington in the 1989 Lancashire Cup Final during the 1989–90 season at Knowsley Road, St. Helens on Saturday 14 October 1989. He also played in the club's 30–29 win against Featherstone Rovers in the 1989–90 Divisional Premiership final.

=== Castleford ===
In August 1993, Russell was signed by Castleford in exchange for Shaun Irwin.

Russell played hooker in Castleford' 33–2 victory over Wigan in the 1993–94 Regal Trophy Final during the 1993–94 season at Headingley, Leeds on Saturday 22 January 1994.

Russell left the club in 1999 to join Bramley.

=== International honours ===
Russell won a cap for England while at Castleford Tigers in 1995 against Wales.
