= Bob Jackson (rugby league, born 1960) =

Australian rugby league footballer

Personal information
- Full name: Robert Jackson
- Born: 13 August 1960 (age 66) Australia

Playing information
- Position: Prop, Second-row
Club
Years	Team	Pld	T	G	FG	P
1982–83	Penrith Panthers	10	1	0	0	4
1984	Fulham	8	1	0	0	4
1984–94	Warrington	228	41	8	1	181
1986	→ Cronulla Sharks	8	1	4	0	12
	Total	254	44	12	1	201

Robert Jackson (born 13 August 1960) is an Australian former professional rugby league footballer who played for the Penrith Panthers, Fulham, Warrington and the Cronulla Sharks.

== Playing career ==
=== Early career ===
Born in Australia, Jackson grew up in Lalor Park, New South Wales. He started his rugby league career with Penrith Panthers, making 10 first grade appearances between 1982 and 1983.

In 1984, he moved to England, playing eight games for Fulham in the 1983–84 season.

=== Warrington ===
Jackson returned to England the following season, joining Warrington. He went on to make over 200 appearances in ten years at the club. He also returned to Australia during the 1986 NSWRL season, making eight appearances for Cronulla Sharks.

While at Warrington, Jackson won the 1985–86 Rugby League Premiership with the club, scoring a try in a 38–10 against Halifax, and also won the 1989–90 Lancashire Cup, scoring two tries in a man-of-the-match performance against Oldham.

He was forced to retire in 1994 due to a neck injury.

== Personal life ==
After retiring from the sport, Jackson returned to Australia with Dani his Warrington born wife. Together they own and run a business called Grippy Rubber, Based in Kings Park, Nsw 2148

In 2016, he was inducted into Warrington's Hall of Fame.
