= Brian Johnson (rugby league) =

Australian RL coach and former rugby league footballer

Personal information
- Full name: Brian James Johnson
- Born: 26 June 1956 Dapto, New South Wales, Australia
- Died: 12 January 2016 (aged 59) Horsley, New South Wales, Australia

Playing information
- Position: Fullback
Club
| Years | Team | Pld | T | G | FG | P |
|---|---|---|---|---|---|---|
| 1976–78 | Dapto Canaries |
| 1979–85 | St. George Dragons | 149 | 54 | 0 | 0 | 182 |
| 1985–88 | Warrington | 103 | 48 | 0 | 0 | 192 |
| 1986 | Eastern Suburbs | 12 | 2 | 0 | 0 | 8 |
| | Total | 264 | 104 | 0 | 0 | 382 |
Representative
| Years | Team | Pld | T | G | FG | P |
| 1978 | Country Firsts | 1 | 0 | 0 | 0 | 0 |

Coaching information
Club
| Years | Team | Gms | W | D | L | W% |
| 1988–96 | Warrington | 130 | 64 | 5 | 61 | 49 |

Brian James Johnson "Johnno" (26 June 1956 – 12 January 2016) was an Australian professional rugby league footballer who played as a fullback in the 1970s and 1980s, and coached in the 1980s and 1990s. He played in Sydney for the St George Dragons and Eastern Suburbs clubs, and in England for Warrington.

== Playing career ==
A Dapto junior, Johnson's only representative appearance was for Country New South Wales in 1978.

=== New South Wales Rugby Football League ===
Johnson started his Sydney career at St. George Dragons in 1979, and played fullback. He was a crowd favourite at Kogarah Oval and won a Premiership in his first year with the Dragons. Johnson played seven first grade seasons with St. George and totalled over 140 games, although he lost his first grade berth to Glenn Burgess following a back injury in the opening game of 1985 and when fit again played almost entirely in reserve grade. Johnson did set up the match-winning try and score another in the reserve grade grand final against Canberra.

Johnsonʼs last year in the Sydney premiership was 1986 when he joined Eastern Suburbs for one season. He then moved to England and joined Warrington, where he played had three seasons and scored 48 tries, winning the Premiership Final in his first season.

=== County Cup Final appearances ===
Johnson played fullback, and scored a try in Warrington's 8–34 defeat by Wigan in the 1985 Lancashire Cup Final during the 1985–86 season at Knowsley Road, St Helens, on Sunday 13 October 1985, and played fullback in the 16–28 defeat by Wigan in the 1987 Lancashire Cup Final during the 1987–88 season at Knowsley Road, St. Helens on Sunday 11 October 1987.

=== John Player Special Trophy Final appearances ===
Johnson played fullback in Warrington's 4–18 defeat by Wigan in the 1986–87 John Player Special Trophy Final during the 1986–87 season at Burnden Park, Bolton on Saturday 10 January 1987.

== Coaching ==
In 1988–89 season Johnson became head coach at Warrington. He guided the team to the Lancashire Cup victory in 1989. Brian Johnson was the coach in Warrington's 14–36 defeat by Wigan in the 1990 Challenge Cup Final during the 1989–90 season at Wembley Stadium, London on Saturday 28 April 1990, in front of a crowd of 77,729. Under Johnson, Warrington also won the Regal Trophy in 1990–91 season. In 1993–94 season Warrington finished third in the league on points difference behind Wigan and Bradford Northern. The following season Warrington made the Regal Trophy Final once more, again losing to Wigan. He resigned from his position in January 1996 in the Rugby League Centenary Season following a club record 80–0 defeat against St. Helens at Knowsley Road. Johnson was later employed by the AIS as a rugby league coach.

== Death ==
Johnson died from Alzheimer's Disease on 12 January 2016. He was survived by his wife and two sons.
