= Brett Clark (rugby league) =

Australian rugby league footballer

Personal information
- Full name: Brett Clark
- Born: 1 November 1961 (age 63)

Playing information
- Position: Halfback
Club
Years	Team	Pld	T	G	FG	P
1984–87	Western Suburbs	47	14	0	1	57
1986	St Helens	36	19	0	0	76
1988–89	St. George Dragons	21	9	0	0	36
1989–91	Oldham	70	28	0	0	112
1991–92	Rochdale Hornets	56	17	0	0	68
1993–94	Hunslet	25	8	0	0	32
1994–95	Swinton	11	6	0	0	24
	Total	266	101	0	1	405

Brett Clark (born 1 November 1961) is an Australian former rugby league footballer who played in the 1980s.

Brett Clark was a halfback for Western Suburbs for four seasons between 1984-1987. He finished his career at the St. George Dragons, for two seasons between 1988-1989 and played halfback in the Dragons victorious team that won the 1988 Panasonic Cup. Clark also played for St. Helens, Oldham, Rochdale Hornets, Hunslet and Swinton in England between 1986-1995.
