= Mike Gregory =

Former RL coach and GB international rugby league footballer (1964-2007)

Personal information
- Full name: Michael Keith Gregory
- Born: 20 May 1964 Wigan, England
- Died: 19 November 2007 (aged 43)

Playing information
- Position: Second-row, Loose forward
Club
Years	Team	Pld	T	G	FG	P
1982–94	Warrington	246	45	0	0	176
1987	Cronulla Sharks	9	1	0	0	4
1994–95	Salford	18	0	0	0	0
	Total	273	46	0	0	180
Representative
Years	Team	Pld	T	G	FG	P
1987–90	Great Britain	19+1	5	0	0	20
1986–89	Lancashire	4	1	0	0	4

Coaching information
Club
Years	Team	Gms	W	D	L	W%
1998–01	Swinton Lions	77	32	2	43	42
2003–04	Wigan Warriors	35	25	3	7	71
	Total	112	57	5	50	51
Representative
Years	Team	Gms	W	D	L	W%
1995	Wales
2002	England Academy
2003	Scotland

Michael Keith Gregory (20 May 1964 – 19 November 2007) was an English professional rugby league footballer and coach. As a player, Gregory played either as a second-row or loose forward, and spent most of his club career at Warrington, making over 200 appearances between 1982 and 1994, but also had brief spells with Salford and Australian club the Cronulla-Sutherland Sharks. He won 20 caps for Great Britain, nine of them as captain, and took part in the 1988 and 1990 Lions tours.

Gregory began his head coaching career with Swinton Lions before joining the coaching staff at his hometown club Wigan Warriors. He was promoted to head coach at the club in 2003, but was forced to step down due to illness in 2004.

== Playing career ==
Gregory was born on 20 May 1964 in Wigan, Lancashire, England. He grew up in the Newtown area of Wigan, and attended St John Fisher Catholic High School. He played rugby league for local club Wigan St Patricks before turning professional, signing for Warrington in June 1982.

He made his début for Warrington on 5 September 1982, scoring a try in a 43–5 win against Huyton. A month later, he won his first trophy at the club, playing in the 16–0 win against St Helens in the 1982–83 Lancashire Cup final at Central Park. Gregory played and scored a try in Warrington's 14–36 defeat by Wigan in the 1990 Challenge Cup Final.

Gregory struggled with injuries during his last few seasons with the club. He played his last match for Warrington on Saturday 12 February 1994, making 222 1st team starts and 24 substitute appearances and scoring 45 tries and a total points of 176.

Gregory also won 20 caps for Great Britain between 1987 and 1990. Gregory was selected to go on the 1988 Great Britain Lions tour, and scored a try as the Lions upset Australia in the third Ashes test in Sydney. He captained the 1990 Great Britain Lions tour to New Zealand. He also played in the Rest of the World side against Australia in 1988.

Gregory's testimonial match at Warrington took place in 1994. He is a Warrington Wolves Hall of Fame inductee and Heritage No. 822.

== Coaching career ==
Gregory started his coaching career as assistant to Shaun McRae at St. Helens. He spent three successful seasons at St. Helens between 1996 and 1998, before taking the head coach job at the Swinton Lions in 1999. He later joined the Wigan Warriors, taking charge of the Academy team in 2001. He led the youngsters to first place in the 2002 Academy Championship, before being promoted to assistant coach for the 2003's Super League VIII.

Gregory had international coaching experience with Wales in the 1995 World Cup. He also guided the England Academy team to a historic series victory against the Australian Schoolboys in 2002. He was assistant coach of the Lancashire Origin squad for 2003 and was also appointed as head coach of Scotland for the 2003 European Nations' Cup.

Following the departure of the Wigan Warriors' head coach Stuart Raper in July 2003, Gregory was appointed head coach until the end of 2003's Super League VIII. After Raper's announcement, Gregory had announced his intention to run for the job permanently. It was the first time since Colin Clarke in 1985 that a Wigan-born man has coached Wigan. Gregory spent three months as caretaker coach, remaining unbeaten for 11 matches and guiding the Wigan Warriors to the 2003 Super League Grand Final – becoming the first side from outside the top two to make it all the way – before being awarded the job full-time on a 2-year contract. The grand final was lost to the Bradford Bulls.

== Illness ==
In 2004, it became known that Gregory had been suffering from progressive muscular atrophy, a form of motor neuron disease affecting his nerves and muscles which he had possibly contracted as early as 2001. The illness blocks signals from the brain getting to muscles, causing weight-loss and affecting speech. He went to the United States for a week in May 2004 for treatment. Initially it was thought that he had become unwell from an insect bite whilst abroad. Ian Millward was appointed as head coach of the Wigan Warriors while Gregory was still recovering from his illness.

=== Disagreement with Wigan ===
In September 2004 there were reports that his illness would prevent him from returning to his job at Wigan. Maurice Lindsay said that Wigan would continue to employ and pay Gregory while he was on sick leave and wait for advice from medical advisers.

Gregory felt that during 2004 he would be able to return but that the club blocked his return to work. He took Wigan and the club's owner Dave Whelan to court, claiming Wigan should have done more to help him carry on. The case was settled out of court with Wigan agreeing to pay Gregory £17,500. After the settlement, Gregory said:

I feel robbed of a once-in-a-lifetime opportunity. I am Wigan-born and bred and I was very proud to be head coach of my home town team. As it is for players, it is for coaches, to represent your home town is a special privilege. The support of the players and fans has been exceptional throughout and this has been shown in many ways. If it had not been for them, I do not believe I would have been chosen for the head coach in the first place.

This was my dream job. I was proud to lead my team out into two finals. The supporters had belief in me and the team. I would never have betrayed this loyalty by returning to the job, if I felt incapable of doing it. My health was no different when I wanted to return to work than it had been at the Challenge Cup Final at the Millennium Stadium. However, I was 'frozen out' from that then on.

I feel the management of the club failed to do their duty as a good employer. Never once did I feel they were trying to aid my return to work. The continuing support of the fans and the players has made a horrific experience bearable and I thank you all.

=== Death and legacy ===
On 19 November 2007, having used a wheelchair for the previous year, Gregory died aged 43. In 2008, the Rugby Football League (RFL) introduced the Spirit of Rugby League Award to recognise individuals who have made a significant positive contribution to rugby league, with the inaugural award being presented posthumously to Gregory. In subsequent seasons, the award was renamed in his honour to the Mike Gregory Spirit of Rugby League Award.

Sporting positions
Preceded by Billy McGinty; 2001-2003	Coach Scotland; 2003	Succeeded by Steve McCormack; 2004-2017
