= 2021 Mackay Cutters season =

- Queensland Cup Rank: 12th
- Play-off result: Missed finals
- 2021 record: Wins: 4; draws: 0; losses: 13
- Points scored: For: 330; against: 556

Team information
- Chairman: Steve Dowden
- Coach: Michael Crawley
- Captain: Ross Bella
- Stadium: BB Print Stadium

Top scorers
- Tries: Josh Smith (10)
- Goals: Jack Quinn (32)
- Points: Jack Quinn (72)
← 2020	2022 →

The 2021 Mackay Cutters season was the 14th in the club's history. Coached by Michael Crawley and captained by Ross Bella, they competed in the Intrust Super Cup.

The 2021 season marked the return of the Cutters after the 2020 season was cancelled after just one round due to the COVID-19 pandemic.

== Season summary ==
=== Milestones ===
- Round 1: Aidan Beard, Michael Bell, Ben Condon, Brandon Finnegan, Kyle Krisanski-Kennedy, Jaymon Moore, Sean Mullany, Blake Paskins, Jack Quinn, Josh Smith, Matiu Stone-Dunn and Murray Taulagi made their debuts for the club.
- Round 1: Kyle Krisanski-Kennedy, Blake Paskins, Josh Smith and Matiu Stone-Dunn scored their first tries for the club.
- Round 2: Luke Webley made his debut for the club.
- Round 3: Kane Bradley and Morgan McWhirter made their debuts for the club.
- Round 3: Michael Bell and Kane Bradley scored their first tries for the club.
- Round 4: Shaun Edwards made his debut for the club.
- Round 4: Brandon Finnegan and Sean Mullany scored their first tries for the club.
- Round 6: Jake Riley made his debut for the club.
- Round 7: Paul Bryan and Keanu Wainohu-Kemp made their debuts for the club.
- Round 8: Daejarn Asi and Brenton Baira made their debuts for the club.
- Round 8: Brenton Baira and Keanu Wainohu-Kemp scored their first tries for the club.
- Round 9: Jake Riley scored his first try for the club.
- Round 10: Jesse Dee scored his first try for the club.
- Round 11: Jack Quinn scored his first try for the club.
- Round 13: Bayley Gill and Jake Thornton made their debuts for the club.
- Round 13: Kellen Jenner scored his first try for the club.
- Round 12: Adam Cook, Kai O'Donnell and Beaudan Dixon made their debuts for the club.
- Round 12: Bayley Gill scored his first try for the club.
- Round 12: Hayden Brownsey made his debut for the club.
- Round 16: Laitia Moceidreke made his debut for the club.
- Round 16: Laitia Moceidreke scored his first try for the club.

== 2021 squad ==
Mackay Cutters 2021 Squad
First team squad			Coaching staff
Blake Atherton – PR; Aidan Beard – PR; Ross Bella (c) – PR; Jack Brock – PR; Rayden Burns – FB; Paul Byrnes – FB, WG; Adam Cook – FB, HB; Jesse Dee – PR; Beaudan Dixon – FE; Shaun Edwards – PR	Brandon Finnegan – HB; Bayley Gill – FE, HB; Tom Irelandes – FE, CE; Kellen Jenner – SR; Sam Johnstone – PR; Kyle Krisanski-Kennedy – WG; Jaymon Moore – PR; Sean Mullany – HK; Blake Paskins – CE; Kai O'Donnell – LK, SR	Jack Quinn – LK; Buchanan Rawhiti – CE; Jake Riley – WG; Garrett Smith – PR; Josh Smith – WG; Matiu Stone-Dunn – FB; Jake Thornton – FB; Luke Webley – PR	Head coach: Michael Crawley; Assistant coaches: Brendan Carter (assistant coach); Mick Baker (assistant coach); Tim Rogers (head of performance); Gordon Gu (physiotherapist); Scott Traynor (football manager); Legend: (c) Captain(s); (vc) Vice-captain(s); Updated: 20 July 2021; Source(s): Mackay Cutters

== Squad movement ==
=== Gains ===
Player	Signed From	Until End of	Notes
Adam Cook	Canberra Raiders (mid-season)	2021	
Beaudan Dixon	Souths Sharks Mackay	2021	
Shaun Edwards	Mackay Magpies	2021	
Brandon Finnegan	Glebe Dirty Reds	2021	
Sean Mullany	New Zealand Warriors	2021	
Kai O'Donnell	Canberra Raiders (mid-season)	2021	
Jack Quinn	South Sydney Rabbitohs	2021	
Jake Riley	Western Lions	2021	
Garrett Smith	Newcastle Knights (mid-season)	2021	
Matiu Stone-Dunn	Richmond Rovers	2021	

=== Losses ===
Player	Signed To	Until End of	Notes
Elijah Anderson	Canberra Raiders	2021	
Cooper Bambling	Moranbah Miners	2021	
Jayden Batchelor	Mackay Brothers	2021	
Luke Dolbel	Brisbane Tigers	2021	
Mafoa'aeata Hingano	Salford Red Devils (mid-season)	2021	
Jayden Hodges	Northern Pride	2021	
Ash Little	Northern Pride	2021	
Michael Molo	Norths Devils	2021	
John O'Brien	Mackay Brothers	2021	
Kai O'Donnell	Cronulla Sharks (mid-season)	2021	
Luke Polselli	Sunshine Coast Falcons	2021	

== Fixtures ==
=== Pre-season ===
Date	Round	Opponent	Venue	Score	Tries	Goals
Saturday, 20 February	Trial 1	CQ Capras	BB Print Stadium	44 – 16	Beard, Brownsey, Condon, Dalton, Jenner, Kennedy, Moore, Paskins	Bell (4), Kennedy (2)
Saturday, 6 March	Trial 2	Townsville Blackhawks	BB Print Stadium	18 – 24	Bell, Condon, Mullany	Quinn (3)
Legend: Win Loss Draw Bye

=== Regular season ===
Due COVID-19 lockdowns and restrictions in Queensland throughout the season, Round 12 was postponed and played after Rounds 13 and 14. Rounds 15 and 18 were cancelled and Rounds 16 and 17 were postponed and played after Round 19.

Date	Round	Opponent	Venue	Score	Tries	Goals
Saturday, 20 March	Round 1	Redcliffe Dolphins	BB Print Stadium	28 – 30	Krisanski-Kennedy, Paskins, Pere, Smith, Stone-Dunn	Krisanski-Kennedy (2), Quinn (2)
Saturday, 27 March	Round 2	Burleigh Bears	Pizzey Park	14 – 28	Smith (2), Wright	Krisanski-Kennedy (2)
Saturday, 10 April	Round 3	PNG Hunters	BB Print Stadium	14 – 26	Bell, Bradley, Krisanski-Kennedy	Hingano (1)
Saturday, 17 April	Round 4	CQ Capras	Browne Park	28 – 20	Mullany (2), Bella, Finnegan, Smith	Quinn (3), Krisanski-Kennedy (1)
Saturday, 24 April	Round 5	Souths Logan Magpies	BB Print Stadium	10 – 60	Paskins, Stone-Dunn	Quinn (1)
Sunday, 9 May	Round 6	Sunshine Coast Falcons	Sunshine Coast Stadium	10 – 58	Stone-Dunn, Smith	Quinn (2)
Sunday, 16 May	Round 7	Townsville Blackhawks	Jack Manski Oval	18 – 24	Bell, Pere, Smith	Quinn (3)
Saturday, 22 May	Round 8	Northern Pride	BB Print Stadium	20 – 22	Baira, Bell, Smith, Wainohu-Kemp	Quinn (2)
Saturday, 5 June	Round 9	Wynnum Manly Seagulls	BMD Kougari Oval	16 – 40	Bella, Mullany, Riley	Hingano (1), Quinn (1)
Saturday, 12 June	Round 10	Tweed Heads Seagulls	BB Print Stadium	16 – 24	Bella, Dee, Stone-Dunn	Hingano (1), Quinn (1)
Sunday, 20 June	Round 11	Souths Logan Magpies	Davies Park	20 – 38	Finnegan, Quinn, Riley, Stone-Dunn	Asi (1), Quinn (1)
Saturday, 10 July	Round 13	CQ Capras	BB Print Stadium	20 – 18	Dee, Jenner, Smith	Quinn (3), Finnegan (1)
Saturday, 17 July	Round 14	Norths Devils	Hickey Oval	16 – 40	Atherton, Bella, Smith	Quinn (2)
Saturday, 24 July	Round 12	PNG Hunters	Bycroft Oval	40 – 30	Bella (2), Rawhiti (2), Stone-Dunn (2), Gill	Quinn (6)
Saturday, 31 July	Round 15	Redcliffe Dolphins	Moreton Daily Stadium		Cancelled	
Saturday, 21 August	Round 18	Sunshine Coast Falcons	BB Print Stadium		Cancelled	
Saturday, 28 August	Round 19	Townsville Blackhawks	BB Print Stadium	10 – 28	Riley, Smith	Quinn (1)
Saturday, 7 August	Round 16	Ipswich Jets	BB Print Stadium	36 – 26	Moceidreke (2), Atherton, Cook, Dee, Finnegan, Quinn	Quinn (4)
Saturday, 14 August	Round 17	Brisbane Tigers	Totally Workwear Stadium	14 – 44	Finnegan, Krisanski-Kennedy, Riley	Quinn (1)
Legend: Win Loss Draw Bye

== Statistics ==
*	Denotes player contracted to the North Queensland Cowboys for the 2021 season

Name	App	T	G	FG	Pts
Daejarn Asi*	4	-	1	-	2
Blake Atherton	8	2	-	-	8
Brenton Baira*	1	1	-	-	4
Aidan Beard	10	-	-	-	-
Michael Bell*	11	3	-	-	12
Ross Bella	17	6	-	-	24
Kane Bradley*	6	1	-	-	4
Jack Brock	13	-	-	-	-
Hayden Brownsey	1	-	-	-	-
Paul Bryan*	1	-	-	-	-
Rayden Burns*	4	-	-	-	-
Ben Condon*	5	-	-	-	-
Adam Cook	4	1	-	-	4
Jesse Dee	17	3	-	-	12
Beaudan Dixon	2	-	-	-	-
Shaun Edwards	4	-	-	-	-
Brandon Finnegan	16	4	1	-	18
Bayley Gill	6	1	–	-	4
Mafoa'aeata Hingano	10	-	3	-	6
Kellen Jenner	9	1	-	-	4
Kyle Krisanski-Kennedy	7	3	4	-	20
Morgan McWhirter*	11	-	-	-	-
Laitia Moceidreke*	1	2	-	-	8
Jaymon Moore	9	-	-	-	-
Sean Mullany	16	3	-	-	12
Kai O'Donnell	1	-	-	-	-
Blake Paskins	6	2	-	-	8
Emry Pere*	7	2	-	-	8
Jack Quinn	16	2	32	-	72
Buchanan Rawhiti	5	2	-	-	8
Jake Riley	12	4	-	-	16
Garrett Smith	4	-	-	-	-
Josh Smith*	16	10	-	-	40
Matiu Stone-Dunn	15	7	-	-	28
Murray Taulagi*	1	-	-	-	-
Jake Thornton	2	-	-	-	-
Keanu Wainohu-Kemp	5	1	-	-	4
Luke Webley	5	-	-	-	-
Shane Wright*	1	1	-	-	4
Totals		62	41	0	330

== Honours ==
=== Club ===
- Player of the Year: Ross Bella
- Players' Player: Matiu Stone-Dunn
- Rookie of the Year: Josh Smith
- Club Person of the Year: Marco Peters
