= 2022 Mackay Cutters season =

Rugby league season

- Queensland Cup Rank: 11th
- Play-off result: Missed finals
- 2022 record: Wins: 6; draws: 0; losses: 9
- Points scored: For: 326; against: 368

Team information
- Chairman: Steve Dowden
- Coach: Dave Elliott
- Captain: Ross Bella
- Stadium: BB Print Stadium

Top scorers
- Tries: Blake Paskins (10)
- Goals: Brandon Finnegan (47)
- Points: Brandon Finnegan (106)
← 2021	2023 →

The 2022 Mackay Cutters season is the 15th in the club's history. Coached by Dave Elliott and captained by Ross Bella, they competed in the Hostplus Cup.

The 2021 season marked the return of the Cutters after the 2020 season was cancelled after just one round due to the COVID-19 pandemic.

== Season summary ==
=== Milestones ===
- Round 1: Flynn Camilleri, Ewan Coutts, Sam Fa'apito, Jake Hawkins, Tom Irelandes, Jayden Morgan Andre Niko, Zac Patch, Hiale Roycroft and Kyle Schneider made their debuts for the club.
- Round 1: Flynn Camilleri and Andre Niko scored their first tries for the club.
- Round 2: Scott Drinkwater made his debut for the club.
- Round 2: Daejarn Asi, Ewan Coutts and Scott Drinkwater scored their first tries for the club.
- Round 4: Brendan Elliot, Mitch Fogarty and Luke Ingram made their debuts for the club.
- Round 5: Matthew Vessey made his debut for the club.
- Round 6: Henri Stocks made his debut for the club.
- Round 6: Jayden Morgan and Luke Webley scored their first tries for the club.
- Round 8: Jake Granville made his debut for the club.
- Round 9: Tom Sly made his debut for the club.
- Round 10: Tom Sly scored his first try for the club.
- Round 14: Mitch Fogarty scored his first try for the club.
- Round 16: Gehamat Shibasaki made his debut for the club.

== 2022 squad ==
Mackay Cutters 2022 squad
First team squad			Coaching Staff
Ross Bella (c) – PR; Jack Brock – PR; Hayden Brownsey – SR; Flynn Camilleri – CE, WG; Adam Cook – HB, FE; Ewan Coutts – SR; Sean Dalton – HK; Sam Fa'apito – CE; Brandon Finnegan – HB; Mitch Fogarty – HK; Jake Hawkins – FE	Jordan Hill – WG; Jack Hoffmann – LK; Tyler Holmes – CE; Luke Ingram – PR; Tom Irelandes – FE, LK; Brett Kelly – CE; Kyle Krisanski-Kennedy – FB; Jayden Morgan – PR; Sean Mullany – HK, LK; Andre Niko – FB, WG; Hayden Pace – WG	Blake Paskins – CE; Zac Patch – LK; Jake Riley – WG, CE; Hiale Roycroft – SR, PR; Kyle Schneider – HK; Tom Sly – CE, FB; Henri Stocks – HB, FE; Matthew Vessey – SR; Luke Webley – PR	Head coach: Dave Elliott; Assistant coaches: Brendan Carter (assistant coach); Michael Comerford (assistant coach); Chad Buckby (assistant coach); Brett Sartor (head of medical); Dean Callaghan (head of strength & conditioning); Legend: (c) Captain(s); (vc) Vice-captain(s); Updated: 28 July 2022; Source(s): Mackay Cutters

== Squad movement ==
=== Gains ===
Player	Signed from	Until end of	Notes
Adam Cook	New Zealand Warriors (mid-season)	2022	
Ewan Coutts	Souths Sharks Mackay	2022	
Sam Fa'apito	Beerwah Bulldogs	2022	
Mitch Fogarty	Townsville Blackhawks	2022	
Jake Hawkins	Nyngan Tigers	2022	
Jordan Hill	Wests Tigers	2022	
Luke Ingram	Wagga Kangaroos	2022	
Brett Kelly	Marist Brothers Lismore	2022	
Jayden Morgan	Jamberoo Superoos	2022	
Andre Niko	Burleigh Bears	2022	
Zac Patch	Gungahlin Bulls	2022	
Hiale Roycroft	Norths Devils	2022	
Kyle Schneider	Parramatta Eels	2022	
Tom Sly	Kawana Dolphins	2022	

=== Losses ===
Player	Signed to	Until end of	Notes
Blake Atherton	Released	-	
Aidan Beard	Released	-	
Rayden Burns	Canberra Raiders	2022	
Paul Byrnes	Released	-	
Adam Cook	New Zealand Warriors	2022	
Jesse Dee	Newcastle Thunder	2022	
Beaudan Dixon	Released	-	
Shaun Edwards	Released	-	
Bayley Gill	Featherstone Rovers	2022	
Kellen Jenner	Released	-	
Sam Johnstone	Released	-	
Jaymon Moore	Townsville Blackhawks	2022	
Jack Quinn	Mounties RLFC	2022	
Buchanan Rawhiti	Released	-	
Garrett Smith	New Zealand Warriors	2022	
Josh Smith	Canberra Raiders	2022	
Matiu Stone-Dunn	Burleigh Bears	2022	
Jake Thornton	Released	-	

== Fixtures ==
=== Regular season ===
Date	Round	Opponent	Venue	Score	Tries	Goals
Saturday, 19 March	Round 1	PNG Hunters	BB Print Stadium	10 – 16	Camilleri, Niko	Finnegan (1)
Saturday, 26 March	Round 2	Ipswich Jets	North Ipswich Reserve	52 – 12	Coutts (2), Asi, Bella, Drinkwater, Finnegan, Moceidreke, Mullany, Paskins	Finnegan (8)
Sunday, 3 April	Round 3	Northern Pride	BB Print Stadium	24 – 22	Paskins (3), Bella, Moceidreke	Finnegan (2)
Saturday, 9 April	Round 4	CQ Capras	Browne Park	18 – 26	Bradley, Mullany, Niko	Finnegan (3)
Saturday, 23 April	Round 5	Sunshine Coast Falcons	Sunshine Coast Stadium	10 – 30	Krisanski-Kennedy, Moceidreke	Finnegan (1)
Saturday, 30 April	Round 6	Brisbane Tigers	BB Print Stadium	24 – 12	Riley (2), Morgan, Webley	Finnegan (3)
	Round 7	Bye				
Saturday, 14 May	Round 8	Burleigh Bears	Pizzey Park	8 – 28	Niko	Finnegan (2)
Friday, 20 May	Round 9	Wynnum Manly Seagulls	BB Print Stadium	10 – 28	Paskins, Webley	Finnegan (1)
Saturday, 4 June	Round 10	Townsville Blackhawks	Jack Manski Oval	28 – 18	Paskins (2), Bella, Moceidreke, Riley, Sly	Finnegan (2)
Saturday, 11 June	Round 11	Redcliffe Dolphins	BB Print Stadium	32 – 34	Moceidreke (2), Bradley, Mullany, Paskins	Finnegan (6)
Saturday, 18 June	Round 12	Tweed Heads Seagulls	Piggabeen Sports Complex	24 – 22	Moceidreke (2), Condon, Coutts	Finnegan (4)
Sunday, 3 July	Round 13	Souths Logan Magpies	Davies Park	30 – 24	Paskins (2), Bradley, Finnegan, Riley	Finnegan (5)
Sunday, 10 July	Round 14	Norths Devils	Bishop Park	20 – 38	Bella, Coutts, Fogarty, Riley	Finnegan (2)
Saturday, 16 July	Round 15	Ipswich Jets	BB Print Stadium	18 – 24	Coutts, Finnegan, Riley	Finnegan (3)
Saturday, 23 July	Round 16	Wynnum Manly Seagulls	Ray Edwards Oval	18 – 34	Baira (3)	Finnegan (3)
Saturday, 6 August	Round 17	CQ Capras	BB Print Stadium			
Saturday, 14 August	Round 18	Burleigh Bears	BB Print Stadium			
Saturday, 20 August	Round 19	Sunshine Coast Falcons	BB Print Stadium			
Saturday, 27 August	Round 20	PNG Hunters	Bycroft Oval			
Legend: Win Loss Draw Bye

== Statistics ==
*	Denotes player contracted to the North Queensland Cowboys for the 2022 season

Name	App	T	G	FG	Pts
Daejarn Asi*	4	1	-	-	4
Brenton Baira*	2	3	-	-	12
Ross Bella	14	4	-	-	16
Kane Bradley*	14	3	-	-	12
Flynn Camilleri	1	1	-	-	4
Ben Condon*	13	1	-	-	4
Adam Cook	4	-	-	-	-
Ewan Coutts	9	5	-	-	20
Scott Drinkwater*	1	1	-	-	4
Brendan Elliot*	3	-	-	-	-
Sam Fa'apito	2	-	-	-	-
Brandon Finnegan	15	3	47	-	106
Mitch Fogarty	5	1	-	-	4
Jake Granville*	2	-	-	-	-
Jake Hawkins	2	-	-	-	-
Luke Ingram	6	-	-	-	-
Tom Irelandes	3	-	-	-	-
Kyle Krisanski-Kennedy	7	1	-	-	4
Morgan McWhirter*	12	-	-	-	-
Laitia Moceidreke*	14	8	-	-	32
Jayden Morgan	11	1	-	-	4
Sean Mullany	11	3	-	-	12
Andre Niko	9	3	-	-	12
Blake Paskins	13	10	-	-	40
Zac Patch	4	-	-	-	-
Jake Riley	11	6	-	-	24
Hiale Roycroft	15	-	-	-	-
Kyle Schneider	15	-	-	-	-
Gehamat Shibasaki*	1	-	-	-	-
Tom Sly	5	1	-	-	4
Henri Stocks	5	-	-	-	-
Matthew Vessey	10	-	-	-	-
Luke Webley	13	2	-	-	8
Totals		58	47	0	326
