= 2023 Leigh Leopards season =

English rugby league team season

Leigh Leopards 2023 season
- 2023 Challenge Cup champions
- Super League XXVIII Rank: 5th
- Play-off result: Eliminators
- Challenge Cup: Champions
- 2023 record: Wins: 20; draws: 0; losses: 11
- Points scored: For: 585; against: 508

Team information
- Chairman: Derek Beaumont
- Head Coach: Adrian Lam
- Captain: John Asiata
- Stadium: Leigh Sports Village

Top scorers
- Tries: Josh Charnley (27)
- Goals: Ben Reynolds (75)
- Points: Ben Reynolds (172)
← 2022	List of seasons	2024 →

The 2023 season was the Leigh Leopards's 4th season overall and 1st season back playing in England's top division of rugby league after relegation to the RFL Championship in 2021. During the season, they competed in the Super League XXVIII and the 2023 Challenge Cup.

== Preseason friendlies ==
Date and time	Versus	H/A	Venue	Result	Score	Tries	Goals	Attendance	Report
22 January, 15:00	Leeds Rhinos	H	Leigh Sports Village	W	14-12	Charnley, Leutele, Hardaker	Hardaker 1/3	2,941	

== Super League ==
=== Fixtures ===
- All fixtures subject to change

Date and time	Versus	H/A	Venue	Result	Score	Tries	Goals	Attendance	TV	Report
17 February, 20:00	Salford Red Devils	H	Leigh Sports Village	L	10–20	Charnley, Hughes	Hardaker (1/2)	8,589	Channel 4	
25 February, 20:00	Catalans Dragons	A	Stade Gilbert Brutus	L	6–14	Wardle	Reynolds (1/1)	7,862	Not televised	
3 March, 20:00	Hull KR	A	Craven Park	W	30–25	Briscoe 2, Charnley 2, Amone	Reynolds (5/5)	8,448	Not televised	
10 March, 20:00	St Helens	H	Leigh Sports Village	W	20–12	Briscoe, Charnley, Hardaker, Shorrocks	Hardaker (2/4)	7,734	Sky Sports	
17 March, 20:00	Warrington Wolves	A	Halliwell Jones Stadium	L	20–38	Amone, Briscoe, Charnley, Hardaker	Hardaker (2/4)	12,073	Not televised	
25 March, 15:00	Hull F.C.	A	MKM Stadium	W	24–16	Charnley 3, O'Donnell	Reynolds (2/4 + 2 pen.)	10,952	Sky Sports	
30 March, 20:00	Wigan Warriors	H	Leigh Sports Village	L	6–34	Briscoe	Reynolds (1/1)	9,189	Sky Sports +	
8 April, 14:30	Salford Red Devils	H	Leigh Sports Village	L	20–22	Charnley 2, Briscoe, Reynolds	Reynolds (1/3 + 1 pen.)	6,002	Sky Sports +	
16 April, 15:00	Wakefield Trinity	A	Belle Vue	W	32–0	Charnley 2, Lam, Mellor, O'Brien, Reynolds	Reynolds (4/6)	4,710	Sky Sports	
21 April, 20:00	Leeds Rhinos	H	Leigh Sports Village	W	20–6	Ipape 2, O'Donnell	Reynolds (2/3 + 2 pen.)	6,686	Not televised	
5 May, 20:00	Castleford Tigers	H	Leigh Sports Village	W	30–6	Davis, Leutele, O'Donnell, Reynolds, Seumanufagai	Reynolds (5/5)	5,423	Sky Sports	
12 May, 19:45	Huddersfield Giants	A	John Smith's Stadium	W	30–4	Charnley 2, Lam, Mellor, Reynolds	Reynolds (5/5)	4,977	Sky Sports	
26 May, 20:00	Warrington Wolves	H	Leigh Sports Village	W	30–12	O'Brien 2, Briscoe, Charnley, Reynolds	Reynolds (4/5 + 1 pen.)	8,123	Sky Sports	
4 June, 12:00	Wakefield Trinity	N	St James' Park	W	30–4	Lam 2, Mulhern, Ipape, Charnley	Reynolds (1/1), Hardaker (3/4 + 1 pen.)	26,326	Sky Sports +	
9 June, 20:00	Hull F.C.	H	Leigh Sports Village	W	28–16	Gareth O'Brien, Briscoe, Charnley 2, Joseph Mellor	Hardaker (4/5)	6,006	Sky Sports	
24 June, 18:00	Catalans Dragons	A	Stade Gilbert Brutus	L	30–38	Chamberlain 2, Ipape, Charnley, Briscoe	Reynolds (5/5)	9,636	Sky Sports	
30 June, 20:00	Hull KR	H	Leigh Sports Village	W	34–4	Briscoe, Ipape, Chamberlain, Charnley, Mulhern	Reynolds (5/5)	6,012	Sky Sports +	
7 July, 20:00	Castleford Tigers	A	Mend-A-Hose Jungle	W	34–16	Amone, Lam 2, Briscoe, Charnley 2	Reynolds (5/6)	6,344	Sky Sports	
16 July, 15:00	Salford Red Devils	A	AJ Bell Stadium	W	24–22	Chamberlain, Leutele, Lam, Hardaker	Reynolds (3/4 + 1 pen.)	6,892	Sky Sports	
29 July, 13:00	Wigan Warriors	A	DW Stadium	L	18–44	Amone, Briscoe, Mulhern	Reynolds (3/3)	15,377	Channel 4	
6 August, 15:00	Leeds Rhinos	A	Headingley Stadium	W	13–6	Ipape, Amone	Reynolds (1/2 + 1 pen.), O'Brien (1 Drop goal)	12,785	Sky Sports Action	
19 August, 15:00	Catalans Dragons	H	Leigh Sports Village	L	14–30	Amone, Nakubuwai	Reynolds (2/2 + 1 pen.)	8,602	Sky Sports +	
25 August, 20:00	Hull KR	A	Craven Park	W	10–52	Charnley, Ipape	Hardaker (1/2)	8,013	Sky Sports Action	
3 September, 15:00	Huddersfield Giants	H	Leigh Sports Village	W	34–16	Charnley 2, Briscoe, Ipape, Asiata, Lam	Reynolds (5/6)	6,064	Sky Sports	
8 September, 20:00	St Helens	A	Totally Wicked Stadium	L	12–22	Gildart, Mulhern	Reynolds (2/2)	13,428	Sky Sports Mix	
15 September, 20:00	Wakefield Trinity	H	Leigh Sports Village	W	20–19	Briscoe, Charnley, Hughes	Reynolds (2/2 + 1 pen.), O'Brien (2 Drop goals)	5,565	Not televised	
22 September, 20:00	Wigan Warriors	H	Leigh Sports Village	L	6–10	Lam	Reynolds (1/1)	10,308	Sky Sports +	

=== Table ===
Pos	Team	Pld	W	D	L	PF	PA	PD	Pts	Qualification
1	Wigan Warriors (L, C)	27	20	0	7	722	360	+362	40	Qualification to Semi-finals
2	Catalans Dragons	27	20	0	7	722	420	+302	40	Qualification to Semi-finals
3	St. Helens	27	20	0	7	613	366	+247	40	Qualification to Eliminators
4	Hull Kingston Rovers	27	16	0	11	589	498	+91	32	Qualification to Eliminators
5	Leigh Leopards	27	16	0	11	585	508	+77	32	Qualification to Eliminators
6	Warrington Wolves	27	14	0	13	597	512	+85	28	Qualification to Eliminators
7	Salford Red Devils	27	13	0	14	494	512	−18	26	
8	Leeds Rhinos	27	12	0	15	535	534	+1	24	
9	Huddersfield Giants	27	11	0	16	473	552	−79	22	
10	Hull FC	27	10	0	17	476	654	−178	20	
11	Castleford Tigers	27	6	0	21	323	774	−451	12	
12	Wakefield Trinity (R)	27	4	0	23	303	742	−439	8	Relegation to Championship

Source: Super League
(C) Champions; (L) League Leaders' Shield Winners; (R) Relegated

=== Play-offs ===
Date and time	Round	Versus	H/A	Venue	Result	Score	Tries	Goals	Attendance	TV	Report
29 September, 20:00	Eliminators	Hull KR	A	Craven Park	L	6–20	Charnley	Reynolds (1/2)	9,305	Sky Sports +	

== Challenge Cup ==
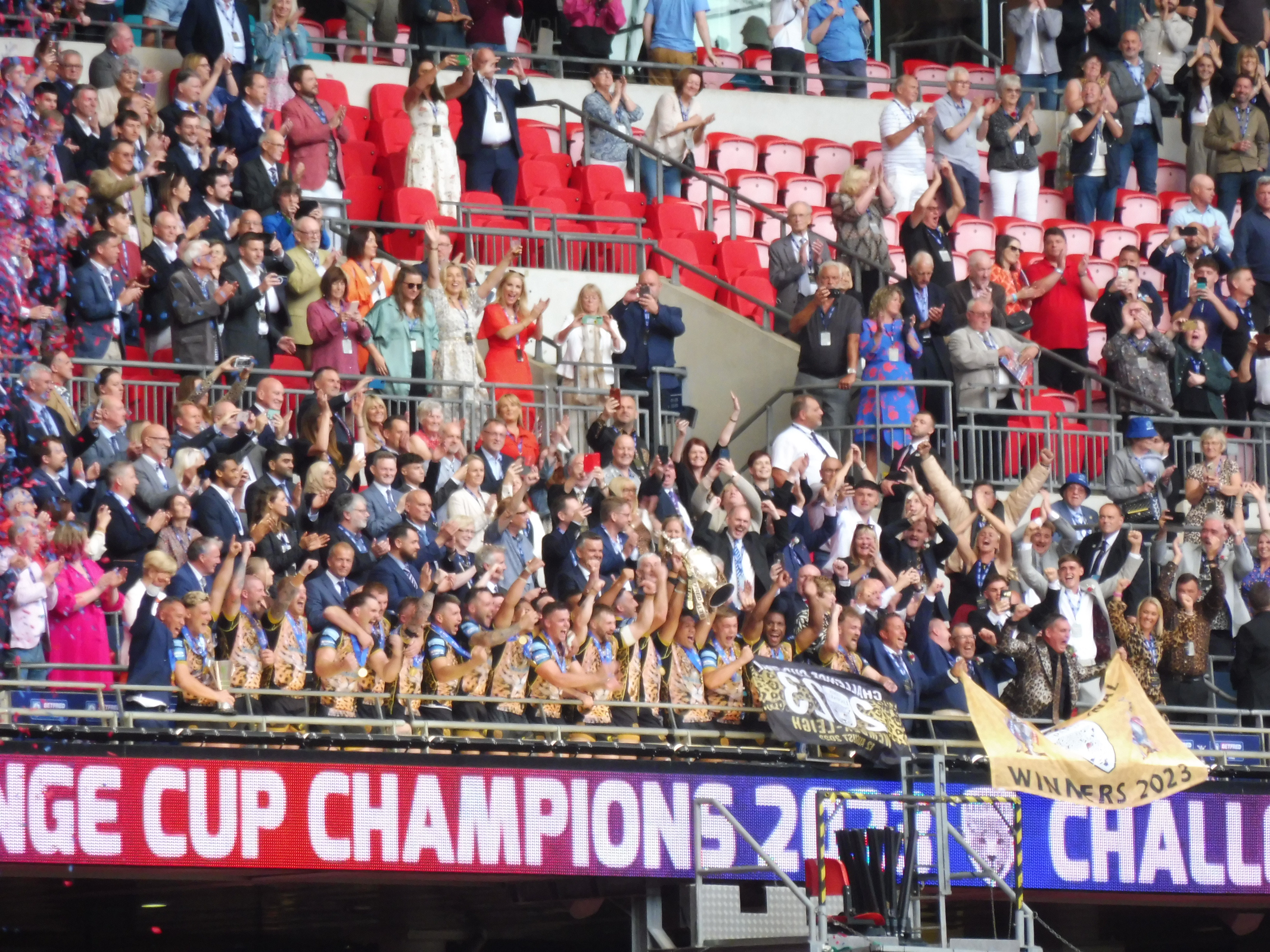
Leigh Leopards celebrating winning the 2023 Challenge Cup.

Date and time	Round	Versus	H/A	Venue	Result	Score	Tries	Goals	Attendance	TV	Report
20 May, 14:30	Round 6	Wakefield Trinity	A	The Be Well Support Stadium	W	40–12			1,568	BBC One	
18 June, 17:00	Quarter Finals	York Knights	A	York Community Stadium	W	34–14	Joseph Mellor, Tom Amone, Briscoe 2, Charnley 2	O'Brien (2), Hardaker (3)		BBC One	
22 July, 14:30	Semi Finals	St Helens	A	Halliwell Jones Stadium	W	12–10	Holmes, Hardaker	Reynolds (2)		BBC One	
12 August, 15:00	Final	Hull KR	A	Wembley Stadium	W	17–16	Lam, Briscoe	Reynolds (2) + 2 pen.), Lam 1 Drop goal	58,213	BBC One	

== Transfers ==
=== Gains ===
Player	Club	Contract	Date
(England) Gareth O'Brien	Castleford Tigers	2 years	October 2022
(Samoa) Ricky Leutele	Huddersfield Giants	2 years	October 2022
(England) Tom Briscoe	Leeds Rhinos	2 years	October 2022
(England) Zak Hardaker	Leeds Rhinos	2 years	October 2022
(England) Nathan Wilde	Newcastle Thunder	2 years	October 2022
(England) Matt Davis	Warrington Wolves	2 years	October 2022
(England) Jacob Gannon	Warrington Wolves	2 years	October 2022
(England) Oliver Holmes	Warrington Wolves	2 years	October 2022
(England) Jack Hughes	Warrington Wolves	2 years	October 2022
(England) Robbie Mulhern	Warrington Wolves	2 years	October 2022
(England) Umyla Hanley	Wigan Warriors		January 2023
(England) Frankie Halton	Hull KR		

== Squad ==
2023 Leigh Squad
First team squad			Coaching staff
1 (England) Zak Hardaker – CE, FB; 2 (England) Tom Briscoe – WG; 3 (Ireland) Ed Chamberlain – SR, CE; 4 (Samoa) Ricky Leutele – CE; 5 (England) Josh Charnley – WG; 6 (England) Joe Mellor – SO, HK; 7 (Papua New Guinea) Lachlan Lam – SH; 8 (Tonga) Tom Amone – PR; 9 (Papua New Guinea) Edwin Ipape – HK; 10 (Ireland) Robbie Mulhern – PR; 11 (Scotland) Joe Wardle – SR, LF; 12 (England) Jack Hughes – SR; 13 (Tonga) John Asiata (c) – LF	14 (Fiji) Ben Nakubuwai – PR; 15 (England) Ben Reynolds – SO; 16 (England) Oliver Holmes – SR; 17 (England) Gareth O'Brien – FB, SO; 18 (England) Matt Davis – HK, LF; 19 (England) Aaron Smith – HK; 20 (Ireland) Keanan Brand – CE; 21 (England) Jacob Jones – SR; 22 (England) Tom Nisbet – SR; 23 (England) Jacob Gannon – LF; 24 (Australia) Kai O'Donnell – SR; 25 (England) Nathan Wilde – LF, PR; 26 (England) Umyla Hanley – CE	27 (New Zealand) Ava Seumanufagai – PR; 28 (England) Joe Shorrocks – LF, SR; 29 (England) Frankie Halton – SR, LF; 30 (England) Dan Norman – PR; 31 (England) Oliver Gildart – CE	Head coach: (Papua New Guinea) Adrian Lam; Legend: (c) Captain(s); (vc) Vice-captain(s); Updated: 30 September 2023; Source(s): 2023 Squad Numbers, Rugby League Project
