= Norman Turley =

English rugby league footballer

Personal information
- Born: 5 September 1955 (age 71) Leigh, England

Playing information
- Position: Loose forward, Fullback
Club
Years	Team	Pld	T	G	FG	P
1974–77	Warrington	26	10	48	0	126
1977–79	Blackpool Borough	46	10	35	22	122
1979–83	Rochdale Hornets	88	13	85	24	233
1981–82	→ Swinton (loan)	7	1	3	0	9
1983–85	Blackpool Borough	61	11	130	28	332
1985	Runcorn	4	1	0	0	4
1985–87	Barrow	54	11	48	3	143
1987–88	Workington Town	23	10	9	8	26
1989–90	Trafford Borough	32	0	2	9	13
1990–91	Whitehaven	19	1	0	2	6
1991	Trafford Borough	3	0	0	1	1
	Total	363	68	360	97	1015

Coaching information
Club
Years	Team	Gms	W	D	L	W%
1987–88	Workington Town
1990–91	Whitehaven
1998	Leigh Centurions
	Total	0	0	0	0

Norman Turley (born 5 September 1955) is an English former professional rugby league footballer and coach who played as a fullback or loose forward. He holds the British rugby league record for most drop goals in a career, scoring 97 between 1974 and 1991.

== Playing career ==
Born in Leigh, Turley started his career at Warrington, making his first team debut at 1974. He played at fullback during his early career, and spent most of his time at Warrington as an understudy to Derek Whitehead.

He joined Blackpool Borough in 1977, where he switched to playing at loose forward. At Blackpool, Turley became a prolific drop goal kicker; when the club won promotion to the First Division in the 1978–79 season, Turley kicked 18 drop goals, the most by any player that season. Blackpool played Australia in the opening game of the 1978 Kangaroo tour, and were defeated 1–39, with a drop goal by Turley being Blackpool's only point.

Later in his career, he went on to play for Rochdale Hornets, Swinton, Runcorn and Barrow. He also had three further spells at Blackpool Borough (known as Trafford Borough during his third and fourth stint at the club) and was appointed as player-coach at Workington Town and Whitehaven.

When Turley ended his playing career in 1991, he had kicked a total of 97 drop goals, the most scored by any player in British rugby league history.

== Coaching career ==
After retiring as a player, Turley became a coach at his hometown club, Leigh. In 1998, he was appointed as head coach for the rest of the season, following the departure of Keith Latham. He remained an assistant coach at Leigh for several years, during which time his son Neil was a player at the club.
