= Moceidreke =

Moceidreke is a surname. Notable people with the surname include:

- Laitia Moceidreke (born 2000), Fijian professional rugby league footballer
- Sitiveni Moceidreke (born 1994), Fijian international rugby league footballer
- Sitiveni Moceidreke (born 1937), Fijian former sprinter
