= 2002 Northern Ford Premiership =

Premiership
- League: Northern Ford Premiership
- Duration: 27 Rounds
- Teams: 18

2002 Season
- Grand Final winners: Huddersfield Giants
- League leaders: Huddersfield Giants

The 2002 Premiership season was the second tier British rugby league during the 2002 season. The competition began with nineteen teams, but York Wasps folded early in the season. Huddersfield Giants winning the Grand Final. This was the last season of the Premiership as for 2003 the teams were split into two divisions of the National League.

== Championship ==
The league was won by the Huddersfield Giants, who beat the Leigh Centurions in the Grand Final. Huddersfield Giants were promoted to the Super League.

=== League table ===
	Team	Pld	W	D	L	PF	PA	Pts
1	Huddersfield Giants	27	26	1	0	1156	356	53
2	Leigh Centurions	27	21	1	5	1021	426	43
3	Rochdale Hornets	27	19	1	7	809	582	39
4	Hull Kingston Rovers	27	18	1	8	715	468	37
5	Featherstone Rovers	27	18	1	8	836	604	37
6	Doncaster Dragons	27	16	1	10	741	603	33
7	Batley Bulldogs	27	16	1	10	658	666	33
8	Whitehaven Warriors	27	15	1	11	647	600	31
9	Oldham	27	13	3	11	748	553	29
10	Dewsbury Rams	27	14	1	12	723	616	29
11	Workington Town	27	13	0	14	677	677	26
12	Sheffield Eagles	27	13	0	14	597	648	26
13	Barrow Raiders	27	12	1	14	707	670	25
14	Keighley Cougars	27	7	0	20	488	906	14
15	Swinton Lions	27	6	1	20	473	918	13
16	Chorley Lynx	27	5	0	22	477	994	10
17	Hunslet Hawks	27	3	1	23	438	954	7
18	Gateshead Thunder	27	0	1	26	338	1108	1

Play-offs

York Wasps started this season but ceased to exist after 11 games. Their results were expunged from the records.

== Play-offs ==
Week 1:

- Hull Kingston Rovers 11 Oldham 19.
- Featherstone Rovers 42 Whitehaven Warriors 14.
- Doncaster Dragons 14 Batley Bulldogs 27.

Week 2:

- Huddersfield Giants 36 Leigh Centurions 10.
- Rochdale Hornets 6 Oldham 20.
- Featherstone Rovers 30 Batley Bulldogs 32.

Week 3:

- Batley Bulldogs 26 Oldham 16.

Week 4:

- Leigh Centurions 35 Batley Bulldogs 28.

=== Grand Final ===
12 October 2002

Huddersfield Giants	38 – 16	Leigh Centurions
Try: O'Hare (2), St Hilaire (2), Thorman, Gene; Goal: McNamara (7)		Try: Cardoza, Marns, Hamilton; Goal: Turley (2)

Halton Stadium, Widnes
Attendance: 9,051
Referee: Karl Kirkpatrick (Warrington)
Player of the Match: Chris Thorman

== See also ==
- 2002 Challenge Cup
