= Sean Richardson (rugby league) =

English rugby league footballer

Personal information
- Full name: Sean Richardson
- Born: 28 August 1973 (age 52)

Playing information
- Position: Second-row, Loose forward
Club
Years	Team	Pld	T	G	FG	P
1993–94	Featherstone Rovers
5 July 1996–97	Castleford Tigers	14	1			4
1997–98	Widnes Vikings	59	12			48
≤1998–99	Wakefield Trinity (Wildcats)	7	0	0	0	0
2000	Dewsbury Rams
2001–2002	Widnes Vikings
2003	Leigh Centurions	46	9	0	0	36
2004–2006	Batley Bulldogs
	Total	126	22	0	0	88

Sean Richardson (born August 28, 1973) is a former professional rugby league footballer who played in the 1990s and 2000s. He played at club level for Blackbrook (in Blackbrook, St Helens), Pilkington Recs, Haydock ARLFC, Featherstone Rovers, the Castleford Tigers, the Widnes Vikings (two spells), Wakefield Trinity (Wildcats), the Dewsbury Rams, the Leigh Centurions, and the Batley Bulldogs as a second-row, or loose forward. He also plays for Rugby Union side Liverpool St.Helens

== First Division Grand Final appearances ==
Sean Richardson was an interchange/substitute in Wakefield Trinity's 24-22 victory over Featherstone Rovers in the 1998 First Division Grand Final at McAlpine Stadium, Huddersfield on 26 September 1998.
