= Runcorn Highfield =

Runcorn Highfield may refer to:

- Runcorn Highfield RLFC, a rugby league club between 1902 and 1997 that was known by this name in the 1980s
- Runcorn Highfield ARLFC, a rugby league club founded in 2005 as Runcorn Vikings
