= Paul Terzis =

Australian rugby league coach

Personal information
- Full name: Paul Terzis

Coaching information
Club
Years	Team	Gms	W	D	L	W%
1999–03	Leigh Centurions	21	17	0	4	81
- As of 12 April 2021

Paul Terzis is an Australian who was the coach of the Leigh Centurions from 1999 to 2003. His reign was notable for a number of 'near misses' as Leigh attempted to win promotion to Super League. He was succeeded by Darren Abram. He writes for Rugby League World magazine as the 'Supercoach'.
