= Chris Langley =

English rugby league footballer

Personal information
- Born: 11 September 1980 (age 44)

Playing information
- Position: Wing, Centre
Club
Years	Team	Pld	T	G	FG	P
2000	Featherstone Rovers
2000–02	Huddersfield Giants	21	3	0	0	12
2004	York City Knights	34	21	0	0	84
2007	Batley Bulldogs
2008	Dewsbury Rams
	Total	55	24	0	0	96
- Source: RLP

Chris Langley (born 11 September 1980) is an English former professional rugby league footballer who played as a centre. He played for the Huddersfield Giants in the Super League, and also had spells with Featherstone Rovers, the York City Knights, the Batley Bulldogs and the Dewsbury Rams.

He made 34 appearances for the York City Knights in 2004.
