= Neil Jukes =

English rugby league footballer & coach

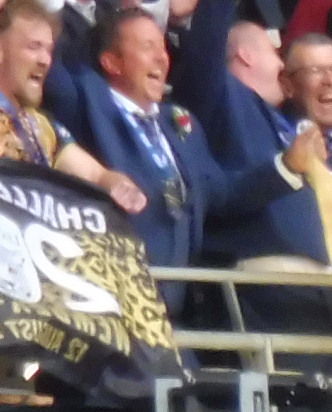

Personal information
- Born: 23 May 1976 (age 48)

Playing information
Club
Years	Team	Pld	T	G	FG	P
1995–97	Leigh Centurions	32	7	0	1	29
1998	Rochdale Hornets	5	0	0	0	0
	Total	37	7	0	1	29

Coaching information
Club
Years	Team	Gms	W	D	L	W%
2016–18	Leigh Centurions	32	10	0	22	31
- Source: As of 18 February 2021

Neil Jukes (born 23 May 1976) is a former professional rugby league footballer who played in the 1990s for Leigh and Rochdale Hornets. and the head coach of the Leigh Centurions. He had been assistant coach at Leigh between 2009 and 2016.

Jukes made his debut for Leigh in January 1995, and went on to make 32 appearances for the club. His playing career ended in 1998 after suffering an injury while playing for Rochdale Hornets.
