= Albert Worrall =

Former England international rugby league footballer

Personal information
- Full name: Albert Edward Worrall
- Born: 25 June 1902
- Died: 10/09/1956

Playing information
- Position: Prop, Second-row
Club
Years	Team	Pld	T	G	FG	P
1922–38	Leigh	503	46	0	0	138
Representative
Years	Team	Pld	T	G	FG	P
1929–31	Lancashire	2	0	0	0	0
1934	Great Britain	1	0	0	0	0

Albert Worrall (25 June 1902 – death unknown) was an English professional rugby league footballer who played in the 1920s and 1930s. He played at representative level for Great Britain and Lancashire, and at club level for Leigh, as a prop, or second-row.

== Playing career ==
=== Leigh ===
In the 1922–23 season, Worrall signed for Leigh from Ince All Blacks. Worrall holds Leigh's 'Most Career Appearances' record with 503 appearances between 1922 and 1938. After retiring as a player, he stayed at the club as a coach and committee member. In 1999, he was inducted in to the Leigh Past Players' Hall of Fame.

=== International honours ===
Worrall won a cap for Great Britain while at Leigh in 1934 against Australia.
