= Tukimihia Simpkins =

NZ rugby league footballer

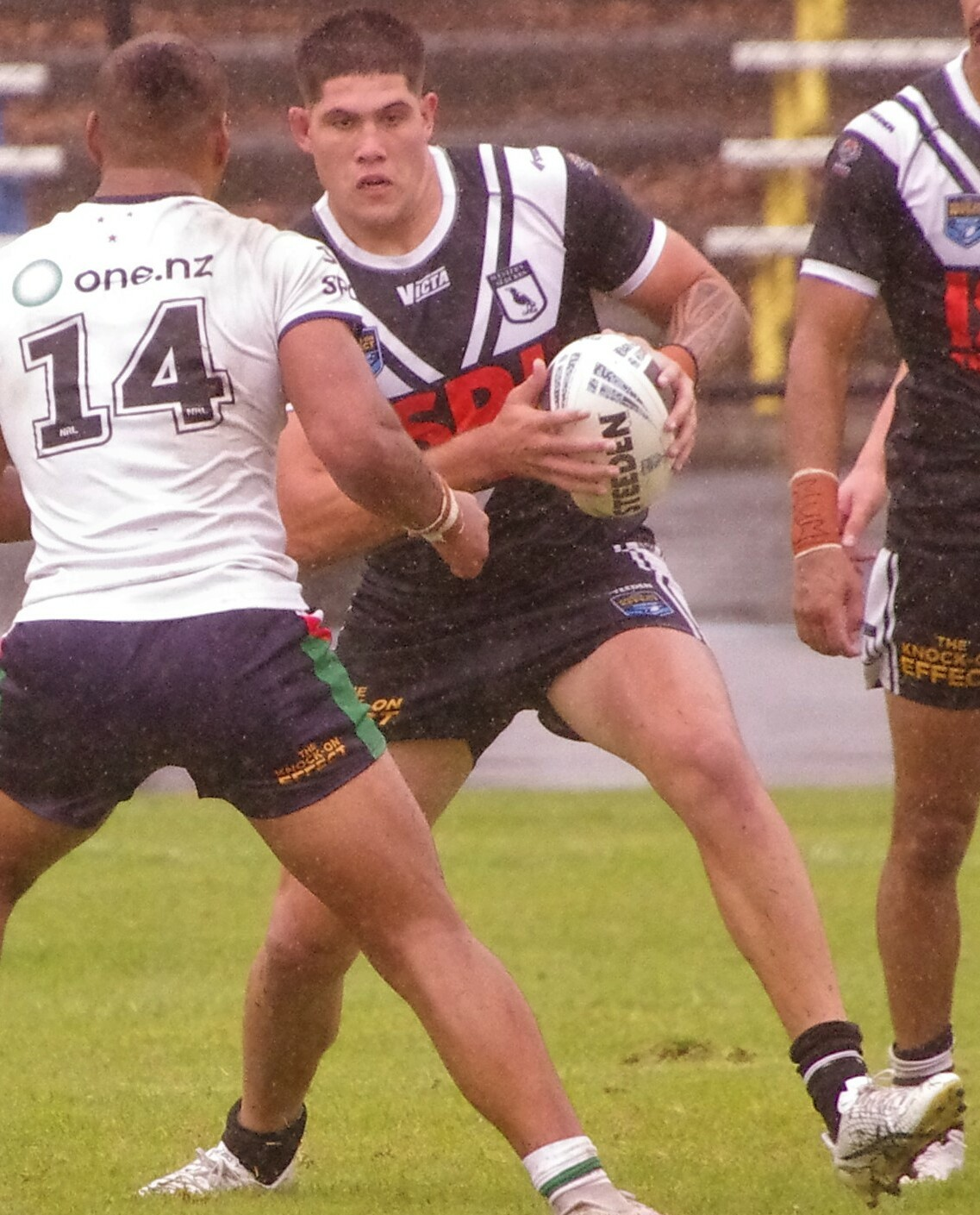

Personal information
- Full name: Tukimihia Simpkins
- Born: 24 December 2001 (age 24) Rotorua, New Zealand
- Height: 192 cm (6 ft 4 in)
- Weight: 106 kg (16 st 10 lb)

Playing information
- Position: Prop, Lock, Second-row
Club
Years	Team	Pld	T	G	FG	P
2021–22	Wests Tigers	5	0	0	0	0
2025–26	Gold Coast Titans	4	0	0	0	0
	Total	9	0	0	0	0
Representative
Years	Team	Pld	T	G	FG	P
2023	Māori All Stars	1	0	0	0	0
- Source: As of 19 November 2026

Tukimihia Simpkins (born 24 December 2001) is a professional rugby league footballer who last played as a prop for the Gold Coast Titans in the National Rugby League (NRL).

== Background ==
Simpkins was born in Rotorua, New Zealand, and is of NZ Māori descent.

== Career ==
=== Early career ===
Simpkins begun his career playing rugby union for Rotorua Boys High School first XV. He signed with Super Rugby franchise the Chiefs when he was 15 and held brief talks with the Crusaders. He was first spotted by North Queensland Cowboys scouts at the New Zealand 15s rugby league tournament in Rotorua in 2016.

He became a New Zealand Secondary Schools rugby league representative and played for the New Zealand Residents team in 2019 before heading to Australia in 2020.

In 2020, he was signed by the North Queensland Cowboys, he played one game with North Queensland feeder club the Townsville Blackhawks in the under 20s competition. He was brought to the Wests Tigers on a three-year deal in a player swap deal with Kane Bradley.

=== 2021 ===
Simpkins began the 2021 season playing for Western Suburbs in the New South Wales Cup.

Simpkins made his debut from the bench in round 18 of the 2021 NRL season for Wests Tigers in their 42–24 victory over the Brisbane Broncos at Lang Park.

=== 2024 ===
Simpkins won the Queensland Cup starting at prop in the Norths Devils 34-20 grand final win over the Redcliffe Dolphins. On 20 September, Simpkins signed a contract to join strugglers the Gold Coast ahead of the 2025 NRL season.

=== 2025 ===
Tuki debuted for the Gold Coast Titans from the bench in there 28-8 round 15 win against Manly Warringah Sea Eagles, it was his first NRL game in two years.

=== 2026 ===
Simpkins started the season in first grade in round 1 coming off the interchange bench an played the following round in the first grade side before cooling his heels in reserves for the remainder of the year - he finished the season with an average of 100 running metres per match and a 98 % tackle efficiency.

On 4 September 2026, Simpkins was one of five players released by the Gold Coast outfit at the conclusion of their season.

== Controversy ==
On 24 January 2022, it was revealed that Simpkins had allegedly been involved in a car accident in which he mounted the kerb and drove through a fence while also being unlicensed. Simpkins then allegedly fled the scene of the accident but later handed himself into NSW Police. The Wests Tigers club later released a statement saying "Wests Tigers have been made aware of an incident involving NRL player Tukimihia Simpkins, the club has alerted the NRL to the matter and will continue to work with the NRL Integrity Unit as needed".
