= Ben Reynolds (rugby league, born 1994) =

English rugby league footballer

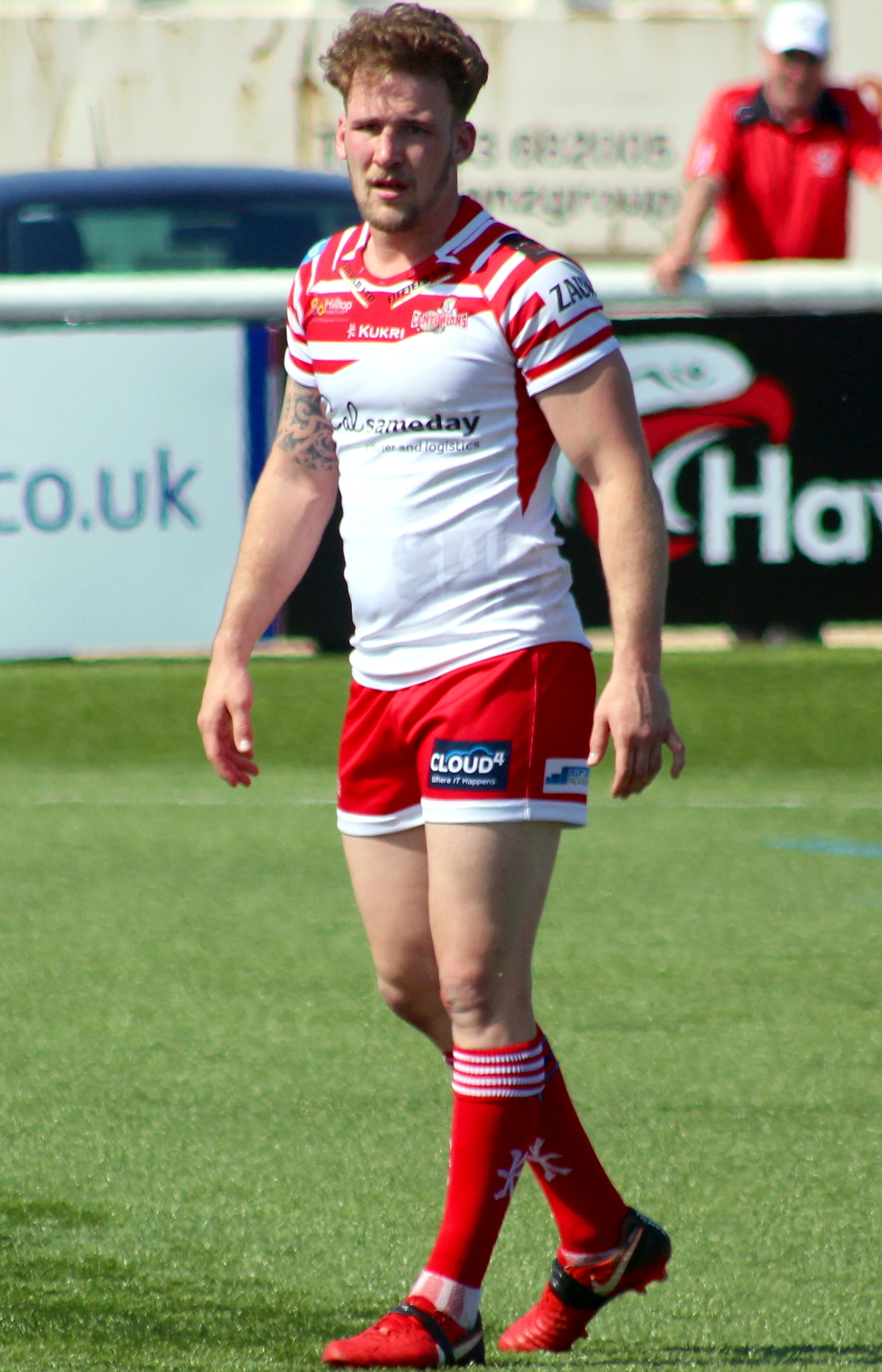

Personal information
- Full name: Ben Reynolds
- Born: 15 January 1994 (age 32) Pontefract, West Yorkshire, England

Playing information
- Position: Stand-off, Scrum-half
Club
Years	Team	Pld	T	G	FG	P
2013–15	Castleford Tigers	4	0	0	0	0
2014(loan)	→ York City Knights	16	7	67	0	162
2015(loan)	→ Doncaster	3	1	1	0	6
2015–18	Leigh Centurions	76	28	207	1	527
2016(loan)	→ Dewsbury Rams	4	1	10	0	24
2019	Wakefield Trinity	6	1	0	0	4
2019(loan)	→ Featherstone Rovers	6	1	9	0	22
2021–23	Leigh Leopards	70	20	14	0	464
2024	Featherstone Rovers	3	2	12	0	32
2024	Hull Kingston Rovers	2	0	1	0	2
2024(DR)	→ Featherstone Rovers	1	1	0	0	4
2024(loan)	→Hull FC	4	1	12	0	24
2024–25	Featherstone Rovers	22	6	92	0	208
2026–	Batley Bulldogs	14	7	47	0	122
	Total	231	76	472	1	1601
- Source: As of 14 October 2026

Ben Reynolds (born 15 January 1994) is an English professional rugby league footballer who plays as a goal-kicking stand-off or scrum-half for the Batley Bulldogs in the RFL Championship.

== Background ==
Reynolds was born in Wakefield, West Yorkshire.

== Career ==
Reynolds has previously played for the Castleford Tigers in the Super League, making his début in 2013. He spent most of the 2014 season on a dual registration contract with the York City Knights and was named as a joint winner (with James Saltonstall) of the Championship One Young Player of the Year award at the end of the season.

=== Leigh Centurions ===
In October 2014, Reynolds signed a contract with the Leigh Centurions for the 2015 season, with the Castleford Tigers having the first option to re-sign him for the 2016 season. He has spent time on loan at Doncaster and the Dewsbury Rams.

=== Toulouse Olympique ===
On 10 August 2020 it was announced that Reynolds would join Toulouse Olympique for the 2021 season.

=== Leigh (re-join) ===
On 1 April 2021, it was reported that he had signed for Leigh in the Super League.

On 28 May 2022, Reynolds played for Leigh in their 2022 RFL 1895 Cup final victory over Featherstone.

On 17 July 2022, Reynolds scored two tries and kicked three goals in Leigh's 60-6 victory over Dewsbury.

In round 14 of the 2023 Super League season, Reynolds was sent off for punching Wakefield's David Fifita during Leigh's 30-4 victory at Magic Weekend.

On 12 August 2023, Reynolds played for Leigh in their Challenge Cup final victory over Hull Kingston Rovers.

Reynolds played 24 games for Leigh in the 2023 Super League season as the club finished fifth on the table and qualified for the playoffs. He played in their elimination playoff loss against Hull Kington Rovers.

=== Featherstone Rovers ===
On 19 October 2023, it was reported he had signed a two-year deal to join Featherstone Rovers.

=== Hull Kingston Rovers ===
On 23 February 2024 it was reported that he had signed for Hull Kingston Rovers in the Super League on a 2-year deal.

=== Featherstone Rovers (DR) ===
On 12 April 24 he returned to Featherstone Rovers albeit on DR loan

=== Hull F.C. (loan) ===
On 9 May 2024 it was reported that he had signed for Hull FC in the Super League on loan

=== Featherstone Rovers (re-join) ===
On 8 July 2024 it was reported that he had re-signed for Featherstone Rovers in the RFL Championship with immediate effect on an 18-month deal, after less than six months with Hull KR

=== Batley Bulldogs ===
On 29 October 2025 it was reported that he had left Featherstone Rovers early, amidst their financial troubles, to join Batley Bulldogs in the RFL Championship for the 2026 season
