= Chorley Lynx =

Defunct English rugby league club

Club information
- Full name: Chorley Lynx
- Founded: 1989; 37 years ago
- Exited: 2004; 22 years ago

Former details
- Ground: Victory Park (1989–1996; 2001–2004) Deepdale (1996–2000)

Chorley Lynx was an English professional rugby league club based in Chorley, Lancashire. Under various names, they were members of the Rugby Football League 1989–93 and 1995–2004.

== History ==
=== Formation as Chorley Borough ===
Springfield Borough had moved to Chorley in 1988 and changed their name to Chorley Borough. At the end of the 1988–89 season, the club decided to move again, to Altrincham as Trafford Borough, and this caused a boardroom split, leading to five Blackpool-based directors resigning to form a new club that would remain based in Chorley and using the Chorley Borough name.

The newly formed Chorley side were based at Chorley F.C.'s ground Victory Park. Ironically their first game was against Trafford Borough in the Lancashire Cup in front of 628 spectators on 30 August 1989, which they won 12–6. The record attendance at Victory Park was 2,851 for the visit of Oldham in January 1990. Chorley's club colours were an all-black jersey with a red and amber band around the waist. Shorts and socks were black as well. Chorley Borough moved to Horwich in June 1992.

Rugby Football League chief executive Maurice Lindsay wanted to reduce the number of clubs in the lower division of the league in 1993. The three clubs finishing bottom of the second division would be demoted to the National Conference League. It went to the wire with Blackpool Gladiators and Nottingham City already relegated, the crucial last match at Nottingham on 12 April 1993, between Nottingham City and Highfield saw Highfield win 39–6 and Highfield survived at the expense of Chorley. The three expelled clubs pursued legal action against the RFL decision, but to no avail.

=== Chorley Chieftains (1995–96) ===
Chorley regained their status in the professional ranks in 1995–96 when they became Chorley Chieftains. They were the only club elected to the league from the National Conference League.

The club were taken over by the owners of Chorley FC, as part of Victory Park Holdings, and became known as Chorley Magpies after the nickname of the football club. The club also started an alliance and academy side. In February 1996, the coach, Bob Eccles was dismissed and former New Zealand international player and Salford Reds coach, Kevin Tamati was appointed as part-time manager.

=== Lancashire Lynx (1997–2000) ===
In 1996 they were bought by Preston North End football club and they moved to Deepdale stadium. They became Lancashire Lynx at the start of 1997 after a short non-playing spell as Central Lancashire. The club colours were originally royal blue shirts with yellow flashings on the shoulders and sleeves, and red trim. Later when the club relocated back to Victory Park, Chorley the shirts became red with black flashings, and white trim. Tamati gave up his post as Rugby League development officer with Warrington Borough Council to become full-time coach with the Lynx on 31 October 1997.

Lancashire Lynx reached the final of the Anglo-French Treize Tournoi in 1998 and finished top of the Second Division. Tamati was released by Lynx at end of the 1998 season, after failing to agree a new contract. Former Wigan player, Steve Hampson took over as coach in 1999. Unfortunately, even though Lynx won the Second Division, the RL decided to merge the First and Second divisions for 1999, so there were only 2 Professional Leagues, Super League and the Northern Ford Premiership. Lynx momentum seemed to falter as the whole division 'had been promoted!'

In 2000, Lynx won just one of their 19 league games, conceding over 900 points. The club had lost their last two games by a record 98–4 to Keighley Cougars and 72–13 to Dewsbury Rams. Hampson left by "mutual consent" in May 2000. And at the end of the season, the Preston North End backers withdrew from running Lancashire Lynx, and only the last-minute intervention of Trevor Hemmings saved the club from folding. Rumour had it that the club were happier if the team lost than if they won, as the majority of players were receiving about £50 per match, with £100 win bonuses. So as long as the team lost, the club didn't have to pay out as much.

=== Chorley Lynx (2000–2004) ===
The club was sold on 6 October 2000 to Chorley Sporting Club Ltd which also included Chorley FC. The club's name was changed again, this time to Chorley Lynx and they returned to Victory Park. Former Wigan player and coach, Graeme West was appointed as coach. In January 2001, Chorley were eliminated in the third round of the Rugby League Challenge Cup following a shock 22–8 defeat to National Conference League amateur club Woolston Rovers. It was the club's 30th straight defeat.

Darren Abram took over as coach after the resignation of Graeme West in November 2002. In 2003 they finished second in National League Two. However, Abram left to join Leigh Centurions.

At the end of the 2004 season Chorley Lynx folded due to poor attendances and the withdrawal of funding by backer Trevor Hemmings. They were losing £1,000 a week with an average crowd of just 434 with only London Skolars and Gateshead Thunder having lower average crowds. Their last match was at home to York City Knights.

Coach Mark Lee and 16 of the Chorley players then joined new club Blackpool Panthers.

== Seasons ==
=== Super League era ===
Season	League									Play-offs	Challenge Cup	Other competitions	Name	Tries	Name	Points
Season	Division	P	W	D	L	F	A	Pts	Pos	Play-offs	Challenge Cup	Other competitions	Top try scorer		Top point scorer	
1996	Division Two	22	6	0	16	354	723	12	9th		R3					
1997	Division Two	20	12	0	8	552	393	24	6th		R4					
1998	Division Two	20	13	2	5	561	339	28	1st		R4					
1999	Northern Ford Premiership	28	7	0	21	544	889	14	16th		R4					
2000	Northern Ford Premiership	28	1	0	27	301	1361	2	18th		R4					
2001	Northern Ford Premiership	28	2	0	26	395	1361	4	18th		R3					
2002	Northern Ford Premiership	27	5	0	22	477	994	10	16th		R4					
2003	National League Two	18	13	0	5	584	362	26	2nd	Lost in Preliminary Final	R4					
2004	National League Two	18	7	2	9	460	522	16	7th		R4					

== Past coaches ==
Also see Category:Chorley Lynx coaches

- Bob Eccles 1990-91
- Bob Eccles 1995-96
- Kevin Tamati 1996-98
- Darren Abram 1998
- Steve Hampson 1999-2000
- Maurice Bamford 2000

== See also ==
- Rugby Football League expansion
- List of defunct rugby league clubs
