= Leigh Leopards =

English professional rugby league football club

Club information
- Full name: Leigh Leopards Rugby League Football Club
- Nickname: Leythers
- Colours: Red, Black and White
- Founded: 1878; 148 years ago
- Website: Leigh Leopards

Current details
- Ground: Hilton Park (1947-2009) Leigh Sports Village (12,005)
- CEO: Neil Jukes
- Chairman: Derek Beaumont
- Coach: Adrian Lam
- Captain: Lachlan Lam
- Competition: Super League
- 2026 season: 5th (Eliminated in playoffs)
- Current season

Uniforms
Home colours

Records
- Championships: 2 (1906, 1982)
- Challenge Cups: 3 (1921, 1971, 2023)
- Other top-tier honours: 6
- Most capped: 503 – Albert Worrall
- Highest points scorer: 2,492 – John Woods

The Leigh Leopards are a professional rugby league club based in Leigh, Greater Manchester, England. Leigh play homes games at Leigh Sports Village and compete in Super League, the top tier of British rugby league.

Leigh Leopards have won the League Championship twice and Challenge Cup three times.

The club's traditional home colours are red and white. They have a local rivalry with Wigan Warriors.

== History ==
=== 1878–1915: Early history ===
Leigh RFC was founded in 1878 by a surveyor named Fred Ulph. Leigh's first practice match was on 5 October 1878 at Buck's Farm in Pennington and their first game was against Eccles two weeks later.

In 1879, the club moved to a field behind the Three Crowns in Bedford and played there for 10 years. Leigh came to the attention of the wider district in 1885 when they had a 23 match unbeaten run with 21 wins and 2 draws. As attendances grew, improvements were made to the ground and the field's slope was levelled.

The club moved to Frog Hall Field, later known as Mather Lane, in 1889. The pitch was drained and levelled, a 10-foot-high hoarding was built around the ground, and a 500-seater stand was erected. The first game at Mather Lane was played on 7 September 1889 against Aspull and Leigh forward James Pendlebury scored the first try in front of a 2,000 crowd.

The 1894–95 season saw a new stand open on the south side in a momentous year for Rugby football. Leigh, along with Salford and Wigan, was suspended for professionalism by the Rugby Football Union, and placed joint bottom of the Lancashire league. With automatic promotion and relegation, it faced dropping down a division, and potential financial ruin. On top of years of arguments with the Rugby Football Union concerning player expenses, 22 teams including Leigh decided to form a breakaway governing body – the Northern Union.

The first season of the new game kicked off in September with Leigh recording a 6–3 loss against Leeds. Leigh finished ninth that season. Leigh had a great start in the new Union, they played well and the crowds increased, but they had mixed fortunes over the next few years. As the new century began, Leigh struggled and despite winning the West Lancashire and Border Towns Cup, the crowds and their fortunes dropped dramatically.

In the 1904–05 season, there was a dispute with Wigan in the Challenge Cup game. The game was played on 4 March 1905 and Leigh won 3–0 in front of 13,000 spectators. The Northern Union, after being alerted by Wigan, alleged that Leigh player Dick Silcock had played illegally after being absent from work in the week before the game without a permit breaking the 'working clause'. Leigh was found guilty of fielding an ineligible player and ordered to replay without expenses and for Leigh the gate receipts to be given to the Northern Union. Wigan won the replay 5–0 and Leigh were so incensed that the club considered leaving the Northern Union and starting an Association football club. Leigh became a limited company as a result of this financial blow.

In 1906, Leigh were Northern Union champions after a season with an 80% win rate. Many clubs complained that Leigh had provided themselves with an easy fixture list, ducking the challenge of the stronger clubs and play-offs were brought in.

In 1907–08, Leigh and Wigan were again in conflict in the Lancashire Cup. An attendance record was set when 17,000 spectators watched Leigh and Wigan draw 3–3 at Mather Lane. Leigh lost the replay at Central Park but appealed for another replay because a Wigan player had left the field during the game without the referee's permission, Leigh lost the second replay.

In 1909, Mather Lane was upgraded when the embankment on the popular side was extended and raised giving the ground a capacity of 20,000 spectators. Around this time Leigh named its first coach – Jim Jolley. Over the next few years, Leigh had little success and crowd numbers dropped dramatically.

When the First World War began in summer 1914, the Northern Union believed that it would be over by Christmas and the season began as normal. Leigh performed poorly. Competitive rugby was suspended in 1915 until the hostilities ceased.

=== Inter-war years ===
Competitive rugby resumed in 1918 with an interim season from January to May. Leigh finished 2nd. Leigh had limited success just after the war and the Leigh directors set about building a new team. They had 19 players and even though their league performances were patchy, they had some success in the cups. In the 1920–21 season, in a round of the Lancashire Cup in which Leigh played Rochdale Hornets, an attendance record was set at Mather Lane when a crowd of 21,500 saw Leigh win 9–7. Leigh reached the final but lost to Broughton Rangers. In 1921 the club won the Challenge Cup with a shock 13–0 victory over Halifax at the Cliff in Broughton, Salford. In 1934, Leigh played under floodlights for the first time, losing 8–25 at London Highfield. Leigh were the first Lancashire side to win the Challenge Cup since 1911.

Over the following seasons Leigh was quite successful in the league and cup. The club attracted huge crowds, and a Leigh v Wigan derby was guaranteed to draw in the spectators. One such meeting when Leigh met Wigan in the first round of the Challenge Cup in 1923–24, saw a crowd of 33,500 at Mather Lane. The 1920s and 1930s were marred by strikes, unemployment and periods of economic depression. The government levied an entertainment tax of around 20% on gate receipts, at a time when clubs were experiencing difficulties balancing the books. For Leigh the mini-boom was over.

In 1924–25, Leigh slipped to 20th in the league and suffered a record 9–52 defeat in the league game at Central Park on Christmas Day. In December 1925 star player Abe Johnson was transferred to Oldham for £650 and Leigh's decline continued the next season when they slipped to 4th from bottom in the league. The club lost every away match and suffered some heavy defeats as confidence left the team. 1926 was the year of the General Strike and Leigh admitted miners free of charge for many home games. Leigh had a decent season, finishing 7th in the league. Around this time, Mather Lane was improved including the construction of a covered terrace at one end, the doubling in size of the grandstand and an iron bridge was constructed across the canal to give the spectators easier access from the town centre.

Growing financial problems forced Leigh to sell players. In the 1930–31 season, the lack of experienced players had an effect on the field when Leigh won only one away game. The directors decided to ease the financial pressure by reducing players' wages. The players went on strike in response and Leigh were forced to play their reserves. The striking players eventually agreed to take a pay cut. Crowds fell to about 1,000 for home games and one midweek fixture against Swinton saw only 400 spectators. Leigh rallied briefly in 1931–32, encouraged by the return of Abe Johnson, but it didn't last. In the 1932–33 season, things were so bad that the players played for free in several games. The club had major financial problems and a young inexperienced team. Financial support from an outside source was received which enabled the club to continue. Things went from bad to worse in the 1936–37 season when Leigh won only five games all season and finished third from bottom in the league. Gate receipts crashed to an all-time low, with the final home game of the season against Broughton Rangers attracting a crowd of around 250 spectators.

From the start of the next season, a new pay structure was agreed with the players, with each receiving £1 each per game. Leigh lost their best players and any new signings were juniors or free transfers from other clubs. The Rugby League Management Committee visited the club in March and two of its members were co-opted on to the Leigh board until the end of the season and the A-team was scrapped to cut costs. The 1937–38 season opened with some encouraging signs as Leigh beat Rochdale Hornets in the Lancashire Cup, their first win in any competition for 21 games. They took the touring Australians to within two points on the opening match of their tour. These were desperate times though and when Dewsbury visited Mather Lane for a mid-week game in November 1937, only 200 spectators were there to see Leigh suffer a record home defeat of 64–6. This prompted the Leigh directors to resign en masse and the Rugby League Management Committee stepped in to prevent the club from folding by guaranteeing their fixtures until the end of the season. The following February, a members club was formed, though the RFL stayed in control until June and Leigh won only one of their last 15 games, again finishing 3rd from bottom.

The club found itself without a ground in August 1940 when Callender's Cable and Construction Company bought the Mather Lane site from the owners, Messrs. George Shaw & Company Ltd of the Leigh Brewery. The new owners needed the ground to store steel drums and cases and they advised Leigh that they were unable to let them have a lease on the ground. Leigh's last game at Mather Lane was a War Emergency League fixture against St Helens on 27 April 1940 where a crowd of only 300 spectators saw the visitors win 16–5. Leigh had intended playing in the 1941–42 Lancashire War Emergency League but weeks before the new season began, the Rugby Football League passed a resolution that clubs could only participate if they had a home ground. Leigh arranged to play at Hindsford Football Club's ground but this was over-ruled by the RFL and Leigh ceased operations for the duration of the Second World War.

=== Post-war ===
In 1946–47, the Rugby Football League drew up the fixture list but Leigh's name was omitted and it was only when local businessman James Hilton made a personal and impassioned plea to the Rugby Football League that Leigh were included. In January 1946, a public meeting at Leigh Liberal Club approved a motion to re-launch the club as Leigh RLFC. The club played the 1946–47 at Madeley Park, the home of Leigh Harriers & Athletic Club. In 1947, the club moved to Kirkhall Lane headquarters and in 1953 floodlights were installed at a cost of £4,100. The ground saw a record home crowd of 31,326 attend a Challenge Cup tie with St. Helens in the same year. Later, Kirkhall Lane was officially renamed Hilton Park after James Hilton.

Leigh signed Jimmy Ledgard from Dewsbury in January 1948 for a then record fee of £2,650. Joe Egan joined Leigh for a record £5,000 fee in October 1950 and succeeded Emlyn Jenkins as player / coach. Leigh finished 4th in the league in his first season. In Egan's second season, Leigh made it to the Lancashire Cup Final and a Challenge Cup semi-final as well as finishing 7th in the league. On Saturday 27 October 1951, 33,230 spectators saw Leigh lose 14–6 to Wigan in the final of the Lancashire Cup at Station Road, Swinton. The club repeated that league placing a year later, this time helping Leigh win the 1952 Lancashire Cup, in front of a crowd of 34,785 at Swinton, by beating St Helens 22-5. The 14 March 1953 brought the biggest recorded crowd at Hilton Park when 31,326 crammed in to see St Helens win 12–3, to make up for their Lancashire Cup defeat.

In 1951, Leigh signed Australian rugby union test forward Rex Mossop. The tough man known as "The Moose" played three seasons with Leigh before returning to Sydney to play for his local club Manly-Warringah. Mossop became a dual-international when he was selected to play for Australia against the touring Great Britain side in 1958 and was the vice-captain to Welsh born Kangaroos captain Keith Barnes on the 1959–60 Kangaroo tour.

An injury to Egan saw him sit out the entire 1953–54 season and his absence hit Leigh hard and the club finished 13th and interest in cup competitions also finished early. Joe tried to make a comeback the following season but was forced to retire, although once more the club enjoyed runs in the cup competitions, losing to Barrow in the Lancashire Cup semi-final and then getting knocked out of the Challenge Cup by Featherstone. Joe Egan remained with the club as coach and the team was successful in his final season, finishing 11th, but winning the 1955 Lancashire Cup for a second time with a resounding 26–9 success over Widnes.

Leigh and Bradford Northern were the first rugby league clubs to stage matches on a Sunday in December 1954, although there was opposition from the Sunday Observance lobby. The 1955–56 season saw the introduction of a tournament titled the ITV Rediffusion Cup. Eight clubs participated in a series of games played at football grounds in the London area, with Warrington eventually running out 43–18 victors over Leigh at Loftus Road.

=== 1971–1980: Alex Murphy era ===
Alex Murphy joined Leigh as player-coach in 1966. In 1971, Leigh reached the Rugby League Challenge Cup Final and defeated Leeds, 24–7. Murphy left Leigh on 20 May 1971 to become player-coach at Warrington.

In 1978, John Woods played and scored in every game as Leigh secured the Second Division. In 1982, Leigh were Champions for the second time, as Alex Murphy guided them to a tense 13–4 victory at Whitehaven, after Leigh trailed 4–1 at half time.

=== 1981–1995: Relegation and ground moves ===
The 1981–82 season was memorable as the club lifted the Lancashire Cup and ended the campaign as winners of the Championship for the second time in their history. Notable players during the season included John Woods, Des Drummond, Steve Donlan, and Alf Wilkinson. Alex Murphy resigned at the end of the season to take over at Wigan, with Colin Clarke taking the reins at Leigh.

Leigh were relegated from First Division in 1985 but bounced back; winning the Second Division Championship in 1985–86, losing one league match. During the season, they twice broke the scoring record for most points in a game against Mansfield Marksmen (76–6) and Keighley (92–2).

Leigh were relegated from the First Division again in 1988 but again won the Second Division title to secure promotion at the first attempt.

Leigh were relegated from First Division yet again in 1990 and crippling financial problems revealed. For the 1990–91 season the club adopted the nickname the Bears, adding a bears emblem to the right breast of the club jerseys. The nickname was only used for one season and did not prove popular.

In January 1991, the club tried to sell its ground to ease cash problems. A consortium offered £200,000 to take over Leigh but the club ended up in administration. Swinton offered to ground share, Station Road, to help Leigh but this offer was refused. Tony Cottrell headed a consortium that took over the club in 1991 and Alex Murphy was sacked on the eve of the new season.

Kevin Ashcroft took over and guided the club to promotion behind Sheffield.

Steve Simms was appointed as the club's first overseas coach in 1992. John Woods broke the club record for points scored in a game at Leigh's home game against Ryedale-York in January 1992. In November 1992, Leigh got a High Court reprieve following the threat of eviction from Hilton Park. St. Helens inflicted a new club record defeat with a 64–9 win over Leigh at Knowsley Road. Leigh regained their form with wins at Wakefield Trinity, Hull and Sheffield; and finished the season with excellent results at home.

In February 1993, Leigh failed in a bid to buy back Hilton Park for £300,000 but in June, they were offered a reprieve and are allowed to stay for another 12 months. Leigh enter administration in July 1994.

In December 1994, Ian Lucas became head coach of Leigh, the youngest senior coach in the game. Despite victories over title-chasing St Helens and Bradford, Leigh were relegated from the top division.

In 1995, the football club Horwich RMI made the decision to move from Horwich, near Bolton, to Hilton Park, changing their name to Leigh RMI in the process. As part of the deal a new company, Grundy Hill Estates, was formed to take over the ownership of the ground. The club adopted the name Leigh Centurions for the 1995–96 season.

=== 1996–2011: Summer era ===
In 1996, the first tier of British rugby league clubs played the inaugural Super League season and changed from a winter to a summer season. As the sport in Britain entered a new era, it was eight years before Leigh gained promotion to the top level of the game.

In April 1996, Eric Hughes was appointed head coach replacing Ian Lucas who was sacked after Leigh had won only one of its first five games of the season. Hughes was replaced by Keith Latham who was in charge until 1998. Norman Turley was head coach in 1998, Leigh finish bottom of the table with a succession of heavy defeats.

In October 1998 Ian Millward was appointed head coach. Under Millward, Leigh finish 4th in the Northern Ford Premiership. Millward left in 2000 to coach St. Helens.

Australian Paul Terzis was coach of Leigh from 1999 to 2003. His reign was notable for a number of 'near misses' as Leigh attempted to win promotion to Super League. In 2000, Leigh made it through to the Grand Final before losing 13–12 to Dewsbury. In 2001 Leigh recorded a shock Challenge Cup victory over Super League Salford, finished 9 points clear at the top of the Northern Ford Premiership winning 26 from 28 league games and claimed the Trans-Pennine Cup. Leigh were defeated in the play-off semi-finals and Widnes went on to win the Grand Final and a place in Super League.

In 2002 and 2003, the relegated Super League sides, Huddersfield and Salford remained fully professional teams. Thus, their full-time fitness and coaching led to defeat in successive grand finals for Leigh. A consortium saved Leigh from administration on the eve of the 2003 season. Towards the end of the 2003 season Paul Terzis was sacked.

In October 2003, Darren Abram was appointed head coach, with a view to taking them into Super League. When Halifax were relegated to play in the 2004 National League competition, their financial troubles meant they were unable to retain a full-time team and struggled, paving the way for Leigh to go about achieving their dream. Whitehaven were the opponents when Leigh won the National League One Grand Final 32–16 (after extra time, 16–16 at full-time) in 2004, thus securing promotion to Super League.

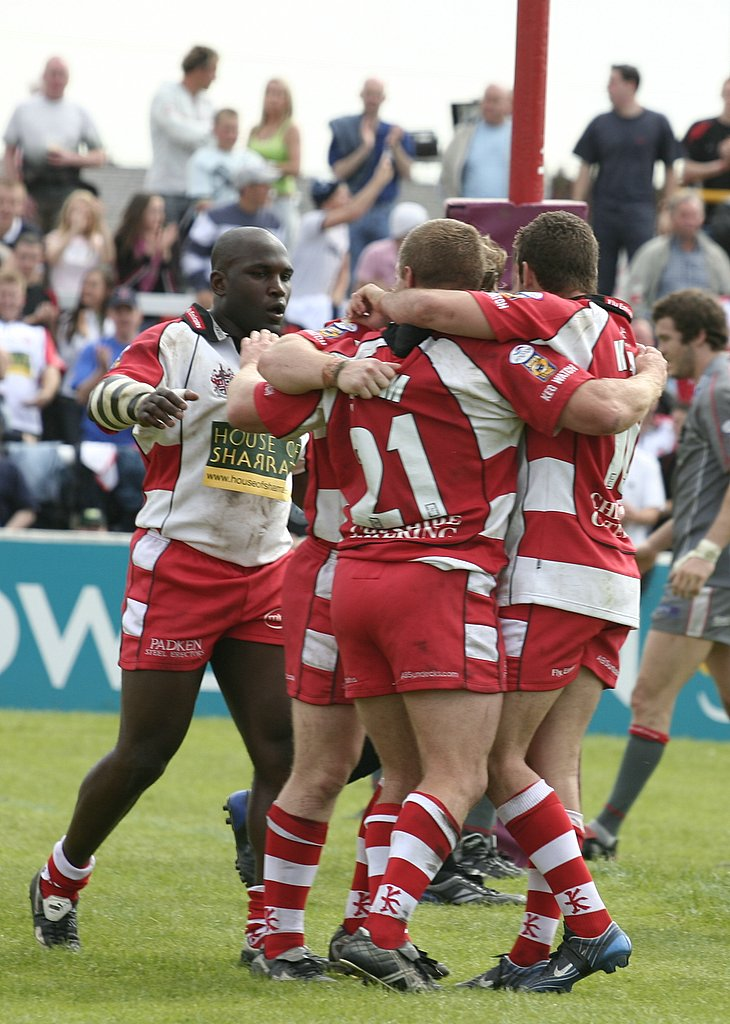
Leigh players celebrate a try in 2005

Leigh's Super League season of 2005 proved a disaster and the club were relegated to National League One after winning just two games. Abram resigned in August 2005 after a disagreement with the board, who felt unable to offer him the full-time contract he wanted for 2006 if the club were not in Super League. Tommy Martyn and Heath Cruckshank both try their hand at the job before Tony Benson was appointed head coach in September 2005. Leigh's relegation from Super League had been all but confirmed at the time of his appointment.

In July 2006, Leigh won the Northern Rail Cup after defeating Hull Kingston Rovers 22–18 at Bloomfield Road, Blackpool. It was the second time the club had won that particular trophy having also triumphed in the 2004 final against the same opposition. A loss to Batley in the play-offs signals the end of Tony Benson's reign.

Following Leigh's 23–22 defeat by Batley Bulldogs in the 2006 National League One playoffs, the club's future was thrown into doubt. The club's owners decided to part company with Tony Benson causing some of the back room staff and management to resign in support of their colleague. The uncertainty also caused a number of the club's playing staff to leave.

Darren Shaw was appointed as coach of the club in October 2006, but it was found that he did not have the necessary qualifications to coach at this level and he was moved to the position of football manager, while assistant coach Paul Rowley was appointed as first team coach.

In January 2007, the club announced it was to drop the Centurions name ahead of its move to a new stadium at Leigh Sports Village. The club changed the name of its stadium back to Hilton Park after renaming it the Coliseum a number of years earlier. Due to an influx of letters, e-mails and telephone calls from Leigh supporters asking the club to re-think its decision; this decision was reversed in May.

Darren Shaw's first full season in charge of Leigh ended with a 19–6 play off defeat away to Whitehaven. Leigh's 2007 season was one dogged by inconsistency. Convincing wins were often followed by heavy defeats as Shaw was forced to field a number of youngsters due to injury problems. The unsettled nature of the side in 2007 was reflected by the fact that Shaw gave debuts to over 20 players over the course of the season.

Despite the disappointing end to the 2007 season, Shaw was given a contract to coach Leigh for the 2008 season. After a promising start to the 2008 season, Shaw tendered his resignation following defeats to Salford, Widnes and Featherstone Rovers. Darren Shaw was replaced by Neil Kelly.

Leigh move to the Leigh Sports Village in December and open the venue with a 4,600 crowd against Salford.

In April 2009, Neil Kelly took up the position of Director of Rugby at the club and his assistant Paul Rowley became head coach. Simon Knox became assistant coach. At the end of the 2009 season, despite winning a 'must win' game at home to Whitehaven 47–14 other results went against Leigh and they were relegated to Championship 1. Leigh were reinstated into Co-operative Championship on 11 November 2009 after the RFL Board took the decision after Gateshead Thunder's chairman Steve Garside wound up Gateshead and Newcastle Rugby Ltd.

Ian Millward returned as the club's head coach for 2010, Leigh took advantage of their reprieve and had a terrific season, finishing in third place in the Co-Operative Championship before losing at home in the play-offs to Sheffield Eagles, whilst also reaching the semi-finals of the Northern Rail Cup before being knocked out by eventual winners Batley Bulldogs.

The 2011 season saw Leigh start as league pacesetters losing their first league game of the season in early June at home to Halifax. That defeat was more than made up for by defeating Halifax 20–16 in the final of the Northern Rail Cup at Blackpool's Bloomfield Road on Sunday 17 July 2011 after a match-winning try in the final 30 seconds of a thrilling encounter from young centre Tom Armstrong. They finished the season well, finished 2n in the league, but they failed in the play-offs, losing to Featherstone Rovers in the qualifying final then losing to Sheffield Eagles in the final eliminator.

Ian Millward left his position as head coach at the end of the 2011 season to take over as head coach at Super League side Castleford Tigers. A new head coach has yet to be appointed (January 2012) with Paul Rowley and Neil Jukes currently in temporary charge of first team matters. Rowley was later appointed first team coach on a permanent basis in January 2012. After a successful first season in charge which included guiding the club to 2nd in the Championship and a Northern Rail Cup semi-final, Rowley was named Championship Coach of the year. In February 2013 Rowley signed a new contract at the club, which will keep him at the club until the end of 2015. Rowley resigned as Leigh Centurions head coach 10 days before the start of the 2016 Championship season, citing personal reasons.

=== 2012–2016: Super League bid ===
In 2012 the club announced its intention to apply for a Super League licence. The club started the 'We BeLEIGHve' campaign, believing that Leigh will be the club nominated by the Rugby Football League to be promoted to the Super League in 2014.

In the 2014 Kingstone Press Championship season, Leigh recorded the best season in the club's history by going the entire season losing only two games; the first defeat coming at the hands of Leeds in the Challenge Cup, and the other coming at the hands of Doncaster. For their efforts, Leigh picked up the League Leader's Shield and went on to win the Grand Final for the first time in 10 years, with a 36–12 victory over bitter rivals Featherstone Rovers.

In 2015 Leigh finished top of the Championship for the second year in a row and were one of the favourites to finish in the top three of the Qualifiers to gain automatic entry to Super League after they knocked Salford Red Devils and Wakefield Trinity out of the Challenge Cup earlier in the year. They eventually finished bottom of the Qualifiers after several close games and were confined to another season in the Championship.

In 2016 Leigh gained automatic promotion after winning their first 5 matches in the middle eight's competition. The club were relegated after just one season back in the top division.

=== 2017–2022: Promotion and relegation ===
It was announced on 14 December 2020 that Leigh would be allocated the spare Super League place for the 2021 Super League season, left vacant after the Toronto Wolfpack's withdrawal; Leigh beat five rival bids.

Leigh started the 2021 Super League season poorly, losing their opening eight matches. On 2 June 2021, it was announced that Leigh's head coach John Duffy had parted ways with the club by mutual consent.

On 23 August 2021, Leigh recorded their first victory in the 2021 Super League season after losing the previous 16 matches in the competition beating Salford 32–22. Despite that, they were already relegated from Super League. Leigh finished the season with only two wins from 22 matches.

=== 2022–present: Leopards rebranding and Challenge Cup win ===
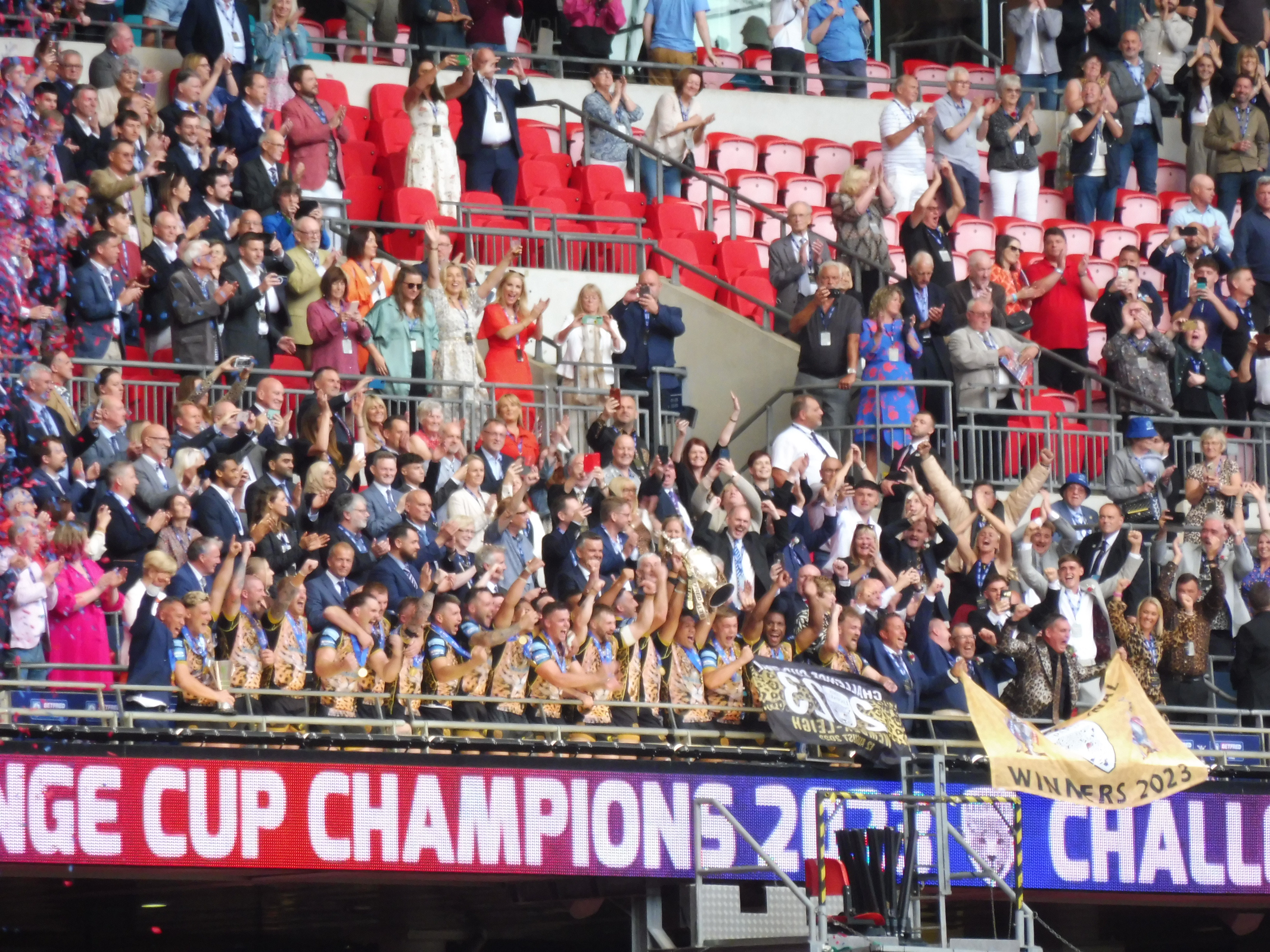
Leigh Leopards celebrating winning the 2023 Challenge Cup at Wembley Stadium

On 28 May 2022, Leigh reached the final of the 2022 RFL 1895 Cup against Featherstone winning the match 30–16. It was Leigh's first triumph in the competition.

On 2 October Leigh defeated Batley in the Million Pound Game and won promotion back into Super League for the 2023 season. On 20 October 2022, Leigh Centurions changed its name to Leigh Leopards. In round 3 of the 2023 Super League season, Leigh earned their first win back in the top flight defeating Hull Kingston Rovers 30–25.

On 22 July 2023 they beat St Helens in the Challenge Cup semi final by 12 points to 10 to reach the final for the first time since 1971. On 12 August 2023, Leigh played in the Challenge Cup final at Wembley Stadium and beat Hull Kingston Rovers by 17–16 after golden point extra time. A drop goal by Lachlan Lam won the game and the cup for Leigh. Leigh finished 5th on the table in their first season back in the Super League to qualify for the playoffs. Leigh's season was ended in the elimination final game against Hull Kingston Rovers as they lost 20-6. In the 2024 Super League season, Leigh finished 5th on the table for a second consecutive campaign. They eventually reached the semi-final but fell one match short of the grand final, losing to rivals Wigan 38-0.

On 1 October 2025 it was announced by both Wigan Warriors and the BBC that Leigh owner Derek Beaumont had emailed Wigan to state that his club would not take part in their 2025 Super League season semi-final match due to ticket allocation issues. Beaumont claimed that Wigan's offer of 5,400 tickets for Leigh fans (22% of Wigan's Brick Community Stadium capacity) was not acceptable. Wigan stated that the "allocation had been determined by the independent Safety Advisory Group and the club's Ground Safety Officer, following consultation with the police" and added "[the] Super League had "sought separate safety advice" and had "fully endorsed this approach"." Leigh went on to lose the semi-final against Wigan 18-6.

== Stadium ==
=== 1947–2008: Hilton Park ===
In 1947, Leigh Rugby League Club moved to new headquarters in Kirkhall Lane, having played at Mather Lane before the Second World War and at Madeley Park (Leigh Harriers Athletic ground) immediately after the war. In 1953 floodlights were installed at a cost of £4,100. The ground saw a record home crowd of 31,326 attend a Rugby League Challenge Cup tie with St. Helens in the same year. Later, Kirkhall Lane was officially renamed Hilton Park after former club chairman Jack Hilton in recognition of his work in securing the site for the new ground.

In 1995, the association football club Horwich RMI relocated from the Grundy Hill Stadium, in Horwich to Hilton Park, changing its name to Leigh RMI in the process. As part of the deal a new company, Grundy Hill Estates, was formed to take over the ownership of the ground. Leigh added Centurions to its name for the 1995–96 season, and as part of the name change the stadium was renamed the Coliseum.

Leigh Centurions moved to Leigh Sports Village for the 2009–10 season. Hilton Park has since been demolished.

=== 2008–present: Leigh Sports Village ===
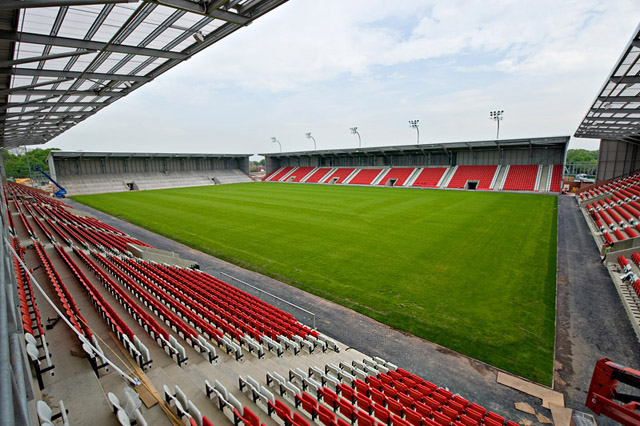
Leigh Sports Village

Leigh moved into their new 12,500 capacity stadium, being made up of 10,000 seats, and a standing terrace of approximately 2,500 in late December 2008. The stadium forms part of the Leigh Sports Village complex was shared with Leigh Genesis football club. The old ground at Hilton Park has been demolished and the land sold for housing development. It was hoped that the new stadium would be the cornerstone of Leigh's application for a Super League franchise in the coming years.

The first game to be played at Leigh Sports Village took place on 28 December 2008. The friendly match against Salford was held as a ramp up event in order for the stadium management company to gain a full safety certificate.

On Thursday 21 May 2009, Queen Elizabeth and Prince Philip visited the region to officially open Leigh Sports Village.

== Kit sponsors and manufacturers ==
Year	Kit Manufacturer	Main Shirt Sponsor
1985-1986		GM Buses
1987–1989	Halbro	Windowcraft
1990–1991	Valpro	Fletchers NiteSpot
1992–1993	Ellgren	Lifting Gear Hire
1993-1994	Bukta	Lifting Gear Hire
1995-1996	Stag	Asda
1997	Mizuno	Asda
1998	Bulldog	Leighton Packaging
1999	Bulldog	Blakeley's Waste Management
2000	Bulldog	ESB Motorcycles
2001	Halbro	Leighton Packaging
2002	Patrick	Leighton Packaging
2003	ISC	Tangent
2004	Kukri	Worthington's
2005–2006	Kukri	House of Sharratt
2007–2008	Kukri	Concrete T.S. LTD
2009	O'Neills	JR's Airport Express
2010	O'Neills	D.N.R
2011	O'Neills	Padken
2012	O'Neills	Widdows Mason
2013	O'Neills	Taylor Drilling Services
2014	O'Neills	O2 Leigh
2015	Kukri	O2 Leigh
2016	Kukri	AB Sundecks
2017–2018	Kukri	Cal Sameday
2019-2020	Kukri	Hilltop Products
2021	Ellgren	Hilltop Products
2022	Ellgren	PPS Design & Build
2023	Ellgren	Homes Together
2024	Patrick	Homes Together
2025	Reebok	Jet2
2026	Debeau Performance	Jet2

== 2027 squad ==
2027 Leigh Leopards Squad
First team squad			Coaching staff
(Papua New Guinea) Jacob Alick-Wiencke – SR, LF, CE; (Australia) David Armstrong – FB; (England) Jack Ashworth – SR, PR; (England) Andrew Badrock – SR, CE; (Ireland) Keanan Brand – CE, WG; (England) Louis Brogan – SR, LF, PR; (England) Ryan Brown – PR; (England) Josh Charnley – WG; (Australia) Adam Cook (gk) – SO, SH; (England) Matt Davis – LF, SR, HK	(Ireland) Frankie Halton – SR, LF; (England) Umyla Hanley – CE, WG, FB; (Papua New Guinea) Liam Horne – HK, LF; (Papua New Guinea) Lachlan Lam (c) – SH, SO; (Papua New Guinea) Edwin Ipape – HK; (Tonga) Tesi Niu – CE, WG; (England) Gareth O'Brien (gk) – SO, SH, FB; (Australia) Kai O'Donnell – SR; (Tonga) Joe Ofahengaue – PR, LF; (Tonga) Tevita Pangai Jnr – PR, SR	(England) Oliver Polec – PR; (England) Jack Purtill – HK, SH, LF; (England) Kavan Rothwell – PR; (Ireland) Innes Senior – WG; (England) AJ Towse – WG; (Samoa) Lazarus Vaalepu – PR; (England) Nathan Wilde – PR; (England) Jordan Williams – PR, SR	Head coach: (Papua New Guinea) Adrian Lam; Assistant coach: (England) Tony Clubb; Legend: (c) Captain(s); (vc) Vice-captain(s); (red card) = suspended; = injured; (gk) = Goal kicker

== 2027 transfers ==
=== Gains ===
Player	From	Contract	Date
(Tonga) Tevita Pangai Jnr	Hull KR	"Multi Year Deal"	26 September 2026
(England) Jack Purtill	Wigan Warriors		9 October 2026
(Australia) Kai O'Donnell	North Queensland Cowboys	1 year	5 November 2026
(England) Jordan Williams	Wakefield Trinity		11 November 2026

=== Losses ===
Player	To	Contract	Date
(England) Owen Trout	Cronulla-Sutherland Sharks	2 years	26 March 2026
(England) Robbie Mulhern	Castleford Tigers	3 years	16 July 2026
(England) Ben McNamara	Castleford Tigers	2 years	9 September 2026
(England) Bailey Hodgson	Hull FC	2 years	4 August 2026
(New Zealand) Isaac Liu	Hull FC	1 year	17 August 2026
(England) Will Brough	Gold Coast Titans	1 year	30 October 2026

=== Retired ===
Player	Date
(England) Jack Hughes	10 September 2026

== Coaching history ==
- Jim Jolley 1910
- Emlyn Jenkins 1948–49
- Joe Egan 1950–56
- Don Gullick 1958–60
- Gerry Helme ????-??
- Alex Murphy 1966–71
- Peter Smethurst 1971
- Derek Hurt 1971–72
- Les Pearce 1972–74
- Eddie Cheetham 1974–75
- Kevin Ashcroft 1975–77
- Bill Kindon 1977
- John Mantle 1977–78
- Tommy Grainey 1978–80
- Alex Murphy 1980–82
- Colin Clarke 1982
- Peter Smethurst 1982–83
- Tommy Bishop 1983–84
- John Woods 1984–85
- Alex Murphy 1985
- Tommy Dickens 1985–86
- William "Billy" Benyon 1986–90
- Alex Murphy 1990–91
- Kevin Ashcroft 1991–92
- Jim Crellin 1992
- Steve Simms 1992–94
- Denis Ramsdale 1994
- Ian Lucas 1994–96
- Eric Hughes 1996
- Keith Latham 1996–98
- Norman Turley 1998
- Ian Millward 1998–2000
- Paul Terzis 2000–03
- Darren Abram 2003–05
- Tony Benson 2005–06
- Darren Shaw 2006–08
- Neil Kelly 2008–09
- Paul Rowley 2009
- Ian Millward 2009–11
- Paul Rowley 2012–16
- Neil Jukes 2016–18
- John Duffy 2018–2021
- Kurt Haggerty (interim) 2021–2021
- Adrian Lam 2021–present

== Seasons ==
=== Super League era ===
Season	League									Play-offs	Challenge Cup	Other competitions		Name	Tries	Name	Points
Season	Division	P	W	D	L	F	A	Pts (Note: Win percentage for 2021)	Pos	Play-offs	Challenge Cup	Other competitions		Top try scorer		Top point scorer	
1996	Division Two	22	10	0	12	594	510	20	7th		R5						
1997	Division Two	20	15	0	5	546	346	30	3rd		R4						
1998	Division One	30	6	0	24	505	1056	12	11th		R4						
1999	Northern Ford Premiership	28	21	0	7	802	524	42	4th	Lost in Elimination Playoffs	R5						
2000	Northern Ford Premiership	28	21	0	7	854	476	42	4th	Lost in Final	R4	Trans-Pennine Cup	RU				
2001	Northern Ford Premiership	28	26	0	2	1139	321	52	1st	Lost in Semi Final	R5	Trans-Pennine Cup	W				
2002	Northern Ford Premiership	27	21	1	5	1021	426	43	2nd	Lost in Final	QF						
2003	National League One	18	15	0	3	702	309	30	2nd	Lost in Final	R4	Championship Cup	RU				
2004	National League One	18	14	0	4	686	407	28	1st	Won in Final	R4	Championship Cup	W				
2005	Super League	28	2	1	25	445	1210	5	12th		QF						
2006	National League One	18	13	0	5	549	334	26	3rd	Lost in Elimination Playoffs	R4	Championship Cup	W				
2007	National League One	18	9	0	9	454	474	31	5th	Lost in Elimination Playoffs	R3						
2008	National League One	18	10	0	8	448	448	34	4th	Lost in Elimination Playoffs	R4						
2009	Championship	20	9	0	11	426	572	32	9th		R4						
2010	Championship	20	12	1	7	580	403	43	3rd	Lost in Elimination Playoffs	R5						
2011	Championship	20	18	1	1	776	368	53	2nd	Lost in Preliminary Final	R4	Championship Cup	W				
2012	Championship	18	14	0	4	612	310	44	4th	Lost in Semi Final	QF						
2013	Championship	26	18	0	8	752	495	58	4th	Lost in Preliminary Semi Final	R4	Championship Cup	W				
2014	Championship	26	25	0	1	1024	396	76	1st		QF						
2015	Championship	23	21	1	1	972	343	43	1st		QF						
2015	The Qualifiers	7	1	0	6	146	231	2	8th		QF						
2016	Championship	23	21	1	1	881	410	43	1st		R5						
2016	The Qualifiers	7	6	0	1	223	193	12	2nd		R5						
2017	Super League	23	6	0	17	425	615	12	11th	Lost in Million Pound Game	R5						
2017	The Qualifiers	7	4	0	3	203	104	8	4th	Lost in Million Pound Game	R5						
2018	Championship	23	16	0	7	849	508	32	6th	Lost in Shield Final	QF						
2018	Championship Shield	30	20	0	10	1059	644	40	2nd	Lost in Shield Final	QF						
2019	Championship	27	18	0	9	792	558	36	4th	Lost in Elimination Playoffs	R5	1895 Cup	SF				
2020	Championship	4	4	0	0	162	40	8	2nd (Note: The 2020 Championship was abandoned due to the COVID-19 pandemic in the United Kingdom, statistics show are that of time of abandonment and are not official. Following the expulsion of Toronto Wolfpack, Leigh were promoted by an independent panel to the Super League after automatic promotion was removed from the 2020 due to the pandemic.)		R5						
2021	Super League	22	2	0	20	356	870	9.09	12th		R6 (Note: Officially round 3 due to the competitions temporary restructure in 2021.)						
2022	Championship	27	26	0	1	1306	208	52	1st	Won in Grand Final	R6	1895 Cup	W				
2023	Super League	27	16	0	11	585	508	32	5th	Lost in Elimination Playoffs	W						
2024	Super League	27	15	1	11	566	398	31	5th	Lost in Semi Final	QF						
2025	Super League	27	19	1	7	619	452	39	3rd	Lost in Semi Final	SF						
2026	Super League	27	17	0	10	644	497	34	5th	Lost in Elimination Playoffs	QF						

== Honours ==
=== League ===
- Division 1 / Super League:

Winners (2): 1905–06, 1981–82

- Division 2 / Championship:

Winners (8): 1977–78, 1985–86, 1988–89, 2004, 2014, 2015, 2016, 2022

RFL Championship Leaders' Shield

Winners (5): 2004, 2014, 2015, 2016, 2022

=== Cup ===
- Challenge Cup:

Winners (3): 1920–21, 1970–71, 2023

- Lancashire Cup:

Winners (4): 1952–53, 1955–56, 1970–71, 1981–82

- Trans-Pennine Cup:

Winners (1): 2001

- Championship Cup:

Winners (4): 2004, 2006, 2011, 2013

- 1895 Cup

Winners (1): 2022

- BBC2 Floodlit Trophy:

Winners (2): 1969–70, 1972–73

== Records ==
=== Club records ===
- Biggest win:

100-4 v. York

- Biggest loss:

94-4 v. Workington

- Highest all-time attendance:

31,326 v. St. Helens (at Hilton Park, 1953)

- Highest summer era attendance:

10,556 v. Batley (at Leigh Sports Village, 17 September 2016)

=== Player records ===
- Most tries in a game: 6
  - Jack Wood vs York, 1947
  - Neil Turley vs Workington Town, 2001
- Most goals in a game: 16 by Krisnan Inu vs York, 2022
- Most points in a game: 42 by Neil Turley vs Chorley Lynx, 2004
- Most tries in a season: 55 by Neil Turley, 2001
- Most goals in a season: 187 (inc 10 drop goals) by Neil Turley, 2004
- Most points in a season: 468 by Neil Turley, 2004
- Most career tries: 189 by Mick Martyn, 1954–67
- Most career goals: 1,043 by Jimmy Ledgard, 1948–58
- Most career points: 2,492 by John Woods, 1976–85, 1990–92
- Most career appearances: 503 by Albert Worrall, 1920–38

== See also ==
- Leigh Leopards Women
