= Neil Turley =

English rugby league footballer (born 1980)

Personal information
- Born: 15 March 1980 (age 45) England

Playing information
- Position: Fullback, Stand-off
Club
Years	Team	Pld	T	G	FG	P
2000–06	Leigh Centurions	124	132	488	15	1519
Representative
Years	Team	Pld	T	G	FG	P
2001	England U21s	2	6	0	0	24
2001	Lancashire	1	1	0	0	4

Neil Turley (born 15 March 1980) is an English former professional rugby league footballer who played in the 1990s and 2000s. He played at representative level for England (Under-21s), and Lancashire, and at club level for Wigan Warriors (academy), and Leigh, as a goal-kicking fullback, or stand-off.

== Early career ==
Neil started his career as a junior with Wigan Warriors, coming through their Academy set-up. As an Academy player he starred in the 1998 Academy Grand Final for Wigan in their defeat by Leeds Rhinos, who boasted such international stars as Kevin Sinfield and Rob Burrow.

His senior career was unlikely to prosper at Wigan as Turley played understudy to Great Britain fullback Kris Radlinski. Turley took the offer in 2000 to join Second Division side Leigh Centurions. Neil's father, Norman Turley, was Leigh's assistant coach. After an impressive debut in a friendly game against Australia's South Sydney Rabbitohs in late 2000, Turley was selected as Leigh's starting fullback ahead of Simon Svabic.

== Debut season ==
His debut season as a senior player in 2001 saw Turley smash the world record for tries by a full back, ending the season with 55. He was named as the Northern Ford Premiership player of the year, and also gained representative honours, playing in both England under-21 Tests against South Africa, and played for Lancashire as the only player from a non-Super League club to play in the Origin series against rivals Yorkshire. His debut season featured a surprising Challenge Cup victory over Super League neighbours Salford City Reds, and saw Leigh finish nine points clear at the top of the Northern Ford Premiership and claim the short-lived Trans-Pennine Cup. Turley was the target of Warrington Wolves who tabled an offer to the Leigh club but Turley turned it down. However, the fantastic year was marred as defeat by Oldham in the play-off semi-final eventually saw the Widnes Vikings go onto win the Grand Final, and a place in the Super League.

== Records ==
Turley broke many club records, including goals in a season and points in a season. Yet the ultimate prize, Grand Final success, eluded Leigh. In 2002 and 2003, the relegated Super League sides, Huddersfield Giants and Salford City Reds remained fully professional teams. Thus, their full-time fitness and coaching led to defeat in successive Grand Finals for Leigh. When Halifax were relegated to play in the 2004 National League competition, their financial troubles meant they were unable to retain a full-time team and struggled, paving the way for Leigh to go about achieving their dream. Leigh defeated Whitehaven 32-16 after over-time to finally attain Super League status for 2005's Super League X.

== Retirement ==
Turley announced his retirement in April 2006, due to a serious recurring back injury. He made 122 appearances for Leigh, scoring 1,501 points, including 132 tries.

== Career statistics ==
Club	Season						
Club	Season	League	Apps	Tries	Goals	Field goals	Points
Leigh Centurions	2001	Northern Ford Premiership	31	55	12	0	244
Leigh Centurions	2002	Northern Ford Premiership	32	29	155	0	426
Leigh Centurions	2003	National League One	22	19	123	4	326
Leigh Centurions	2004	National League One	29	26	177	10	468
Leigh Centurions	2005	Super League X	10	3	20	1	53
