= Joseph Mellor =

English chemist (1868–1938)

Joseph William Mellor CBE FRS (1868–1938) was an English chemist and an authority on ceramics who grew up in New Zealand.

== Early life ==
Joseph William Mellor was born in Lindley, Huddersfield, England, in 1869. He moved to New Zealand with his family in 1879 and settled in Kaiapoi, where he attended Kaiapoi School. During his two years in Canterbury, he worked at the Kaiapoi Woollen Company. The family moved to Dunedin in 1881 where he went to Linden School in the suburb of Kaikorai Valley. The family was too poor to send Joseph to secondary school, but he continued to study in his spare time and undertook self-initiated study at King Edward Technical College. Mellor graduated from the University of Otago in 1898. He won a scholarship to study for a research degree at the University of Manchester.

== Career in the UK ==
Mellor never returned to New Zealand, although he kept in contact with relatives there and represented the country as a governor of Imperial College, London. After his three years at Manchester, he based himself in north Staffordshire where he carried out research in the local industry, ceramics. In 1910 the separate towns which make up Stoke-on-Trent federated, and a decision was made to build a technical college, which opened in 1914 with Mellor as Principal. The college specialised in ceramics and mining: it was provided with a ceramics library by the Carnegie UK Trust.

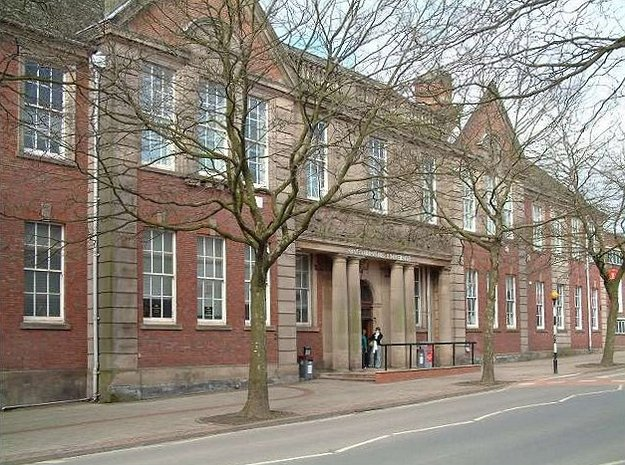
former technical college, Stoke, now part of Staffordshire University

During the First World War Mellor's research was directed towards refractories, high-temperature ceramics relevant to the steel industry and thus the war effort. Although offered a peerage for his contribution towards the war effort, Mellor turned it down saying that he had freely given his scientific knowledge to help his country because ill-health prevented him joining the army and fighting in France.

Mellor's publications include a sixteen-volume work published in 1922, entitled A Comprehensive Treatise on Inorganic and Theoretical Chemistry. He dedicated this work "to the Privates in the Great Army of Workers in Chemistry: Their Names Have Been Forgotten, Their Works Remain."

== Honors and awards ==
In 1927 Mellor became only the second person to be elected to the Royal Society for work related to ceramics, the first having been Josiah Wedgwood in the eighteenth century. He was appointed a Commander of the Order of the British Empire (CBE) in the 1938 New Year Honours.

== Bibliography ==
- Mellor, J. W. (1912), Modern inorganic chemistry, London: Longmans, Green, OL 7178815M
- Mellor, J. W. (1934), Uncle Joe's Nonsense for Young and Old Children, London: Longmans, Green
