= Kukri Sports =

International sportswear brand

- Industry: Sporting goods
- Founded: 1999
- Headquarters: Chorley, Lancashire, United Kingdom
- Area served: Worldwide
- Key people: Andrew Ronnie (GEC)
- Products: Sportswear
- Website: kukrisports.com

Kukri Sports Ltd (pronounced "kuk-ree") is an international sportswear brand that specialises in manufacturing bespoke sportswear for over 100 sports, including rugby league, rugby union, netball, hockey, cricket and football.

The name 'Kukri' is taken from a well travelled Rugby team, the Flying Kukris, who were inspired by the Gurkhas and their Kukri knife.

== Products ==
Kukri provides sportswear for over 100 sports worldwide, manufacturing player kits, training kits and other sports merchandise.

== Commonwealth Games ==
On 24 April 2013, Kukri announced a deal to supply all delegation and teamwear for the 2014 Commonwealth Games in Glasgow for Commonwealth Games England. The announcement was made at St George's Park National Football Centre on St. George's Day (23 April 2013). Kukri supplied apparel for over 500 team members for the Games, including all their formal wear for the opening ceremony, competition teamwear and delegation wear, including ceremonial tracksuits.

The Commonwealth Games England kit was revealed for the first time with a fashion show at the Trafford Centre on Wednesday, 28 May 2014. Kukri and Commonwealth Games England then began kitting out Team Members with a kitting out distribution session spread over two weeks at St George's Park National Football Centre.

As well as kitting out Commonwealth Games England, Kukri also provided kit to other nations including Canada, Wales, Scotland, Jersey, Papua New Guinea, Isle of Man, Northern Ireland, Gibraltar, Anguilla and Guernsey.
