= Trans-Pennine Cup =

Former rugby league competition

- Sport: Rugby league
- Instituted: 1998
- Ceased: 2001
- Replaced by: Championship Cup
- Number of teams: 2
- Country: England (RFL)

The Trans-Pennine Cup was a short-lived competition for professional British rugby league clubs in the RFL Second Division.

The competition had no qualification rounds; only a final was played. The finalists were the highest placed team in the Northern Ford Premiership from either side of the Pennines (Yorkshire versus Lancashire/Cumbria), at an early stage of the season.

In 2001 the competition was replaced by the Championship Cup, a longer and more structured competition.

== Winners ==
Season	Winners	Score	Runners-up
1998	Batley Bulldogs	28–12	Oldham
2000	Dewsbury Rams	10–8	Leigh Centurions
2001	Leigh Centurions	36–0	Keighley Cougars

== See also ==
- National League Cup
