= Darren Abram =

English RL coach and former rugby league footballer

Personal information
- Born: 27 September 1967 (age 57)

Playing information
- Position: Centre
Club
Years	Team	Pld	T	G	FG	P
1987	Warrington	1	0	0	0	0
1987–88	Swinton
1988–90	Springfield Borough
1990–93	Rochdale Hornets	71	40	9	1	179
1993–97	Oldham	127	64	11	0	278
1998–99	Lancashire Lynx	51	20	0	1	81
	Total	250	124	20	2	538

Coaching information
Club
Years	Team	Gms	W	D	L	W%
2003–05	Leigh Centurions
2005–07	Rochdale Hornets
	Total	0	0	0	0

Darren Abram (born 27 September 1967) is a rugby league footballer who played in the 1980s and 1990s, and coached in the 2000s. He played at club level for Warrington, Swinton (1987–88), Springfield Borough (1988–90), the Rochdale Hornets (1990–91), Oldham (1993–97), Lancashire Lynx (1998), as a centre, and coached at club level for Chorley Lynx, the Leigh Centurions (2003–05), and the Rochdale Hornets (2006–07).

== Playing career ==
Abram started his career at Warrington, making one appearance in 1987. In 1988, he spent a month on loan at Swinton, before being transferred to Chorley Borough later that year.

Darren Abram played, and scored a try in Rochdale Hornets 14–24 defeat by St. Helens in the 1991 Lancashire Cup Final during the 1991–92 season at Wilderspool Stadium, Warrington, on Sunday 20 October 1991.

== Coaching career ==
Abram cut his coaching teeth with Chorley Lynx in National League Two and was taken on by the Leigh Centurions, with a view to taking them into the Super League, in October 2003. He accomplished this in his first season as Leigh Centurions beat Whitehaven in a dramatic National League One Grand Final. Leigh Centurions' Super League season of 2005, however, proved a disaster and the club were relegated after winning just two games, with Abram leaving in August 2005. He was appointed Rochdale Hornets' coach in November 2005, as successor to Bobbie Goulding, who had resigned two weeks earlier. Abram parted company from Rochdale Hornets in July 2007.

== Personal life ==
Darren Abram is the father of the rugby league fullback, wing, stand-off, scrum-half who has played in the 2010s and 2020s for Barrow Raiders, Rochdale Hornets and Oldham; Dan Abram.
