= Sitiveni Moceidreke =

Fiji international rugby league footballer

Siti Moceidreke
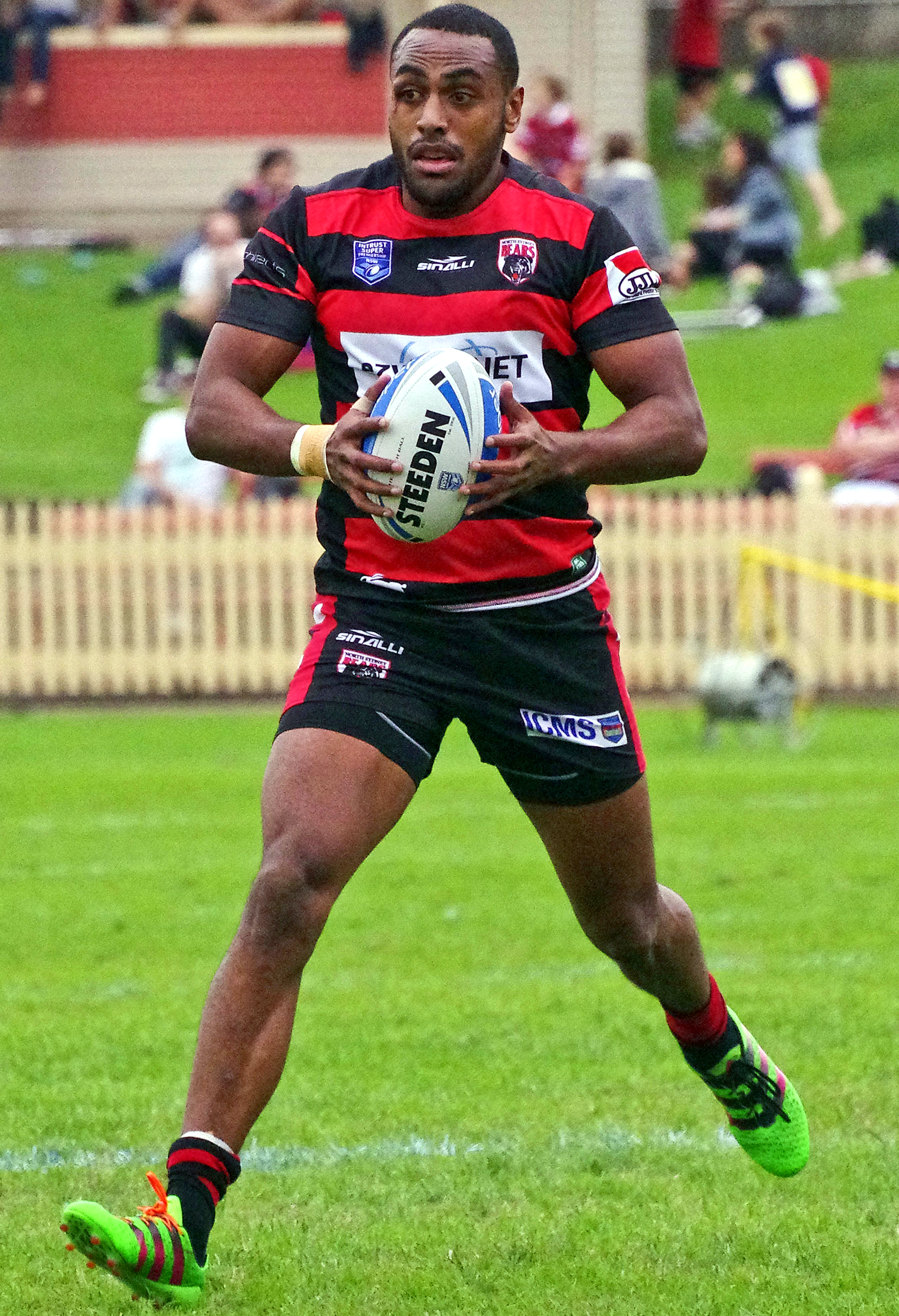

Personal information
- Full name: Sitiveni Moceidreke
- Born: 27 November 1994 (age 31) Sydney, New South Wales, Australia
- Height: 6 ft 2 in (1.88 m)
- Weight: 15 st 10 lb (100 kg)

Playing information
- Position: Centre, Fullback, Scrum-half, Stand-off
Club
Years	Team	Pld	T	G	FG	P
2017	South Sydney	1	1	0	0	4
2022	London Broncos	24	6	13	0	50
	Total	25	7	13	0	54
Representative
Years	Team	Pld	T	G	FG	P
2014–22	Fiji	9	0	8	0	16
- Source: As of 5 November 2022
- Relatives: Laitia Moceidreke (brother)

Sitiveni Moceidreke (born 27 November 1994) is a Fiji international rugby league footballer who plays as a centre, fullback, scrum-half and stand-off.

He has previously played for the South Sydney Rabbitohs in the National Rugby League, and London Broncos in the RFL Championship.

== Background ==
Born in Sydney, Australia, Moceidreke is of Fijian descent. He played his junior rugby league for Hurstville United, before being signed by the St. George Illawarra Dragons. His younger brother, Laitia, is a professional rugby league player for the North Queensland Cowboys. He has a younger brother Waisea, who played for Australia in Physical Disability Rugby League World Cup in 2026.

== Playing career ==
=== Early career ===
In 2012, Moceidreke played for St George Dragons in the SG Ball competition. In 2013 and 2014, Moceidreke moved up to St George Illawarra's NYC team. He then signed with the Illawarra Cutters for the 2015 season. In 2016, he signed with the North Sydney Bears. In the same year, Moceidreke played for Fiji against Papua New Guinea in the 2016 Melanesian Cup, playing at five-eighth. Later in the year, he again played for Fiji against Samoa, playing at fullback. Moceidreke continued to be a mainstay of The North Sydney team in 2016 making a total of 21 appearances for the season.

=== 2017 ===
Moceidreke began the 2017 playing for the North Sydney Bears in the Intrust Super Premiership NSW. After an impressive performance in the ISP round 2 match, scoring four tries, he was signed by the South Sydney Rabbitohs. On his NRL debut in the fourth round, he scored the only try for South Sydney in their 20–6 loss to the Sydney Roosters. Moceidreke was selected in the Fijian squad to play in the 2017 Rugby League World Cup. On 15 November 2017, it was revealed that Moceidreke had signed a deal with Canberra Raiders feeder club side The Mount Pritchard Mounties for The 2018 season as part of an opportunity to get a trial and train contract for the NRL squad.

=== 2018 ===
Moceidreke made 19 appearances for Mounties scoring 9 tries and kicking 52 goals finishing with a total of 140 points for the season.

=== 2019 ===
After being released by Canberra, Moceidreke joined the Sunshine Coast in the Queensland Cup competition.

=== 2020 ===
Moceidreke played for the Melbourne Storm at the NRL Nines in Perth, Western Australia.

=== 2021 ===
In January 2021, he joined St. George in the NSW Cup. He made his debut in round 1 of the competition against Newtown at Kogarah Oval.

=== 2022 ===
In January 2022, it was announced that he had signed for the London Broncos in the Championship.
