= Kane Bradley =

Australian rugby league player

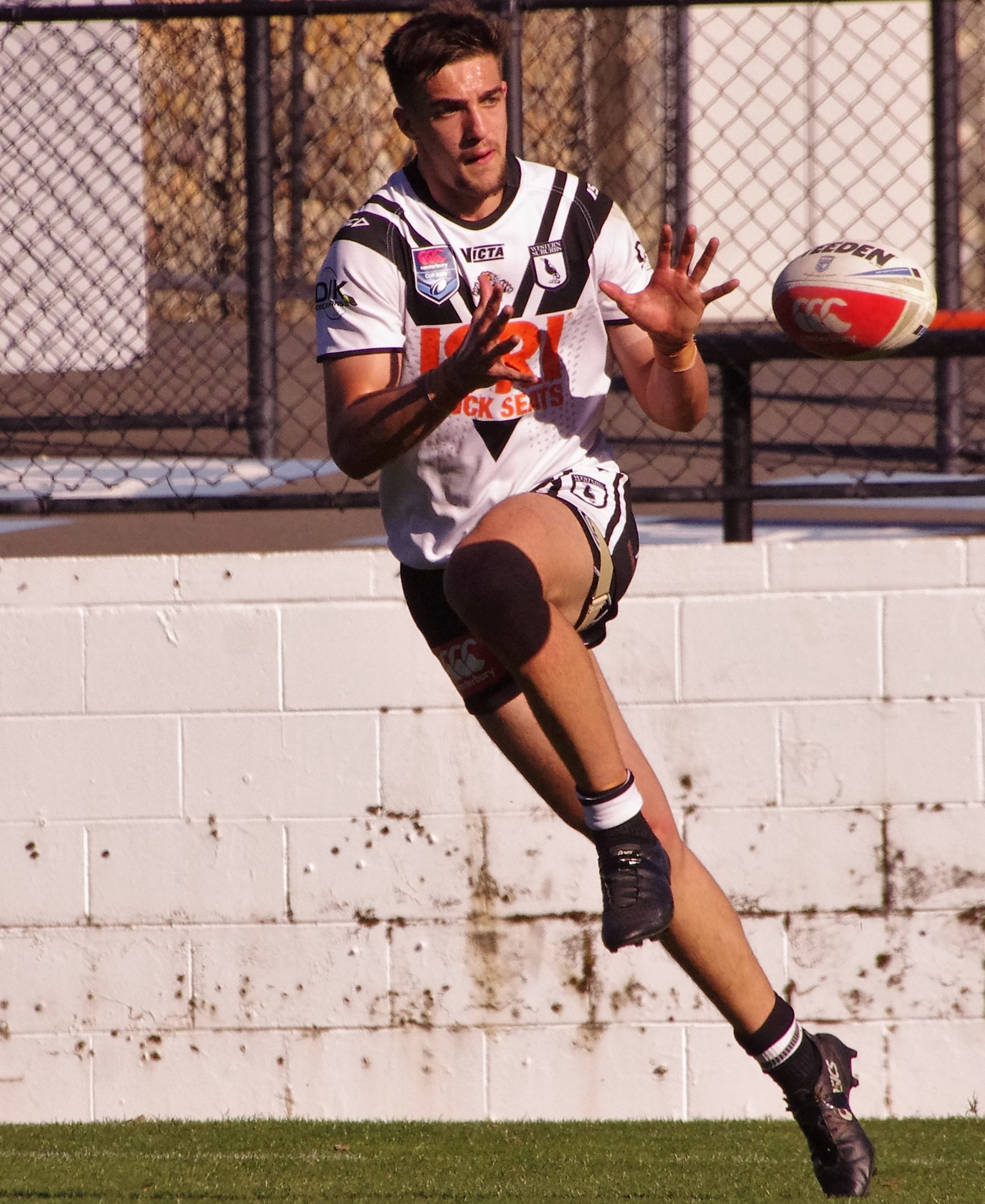

Personal information
- Born: 3 February 2000 (age 26) Sydney, New South Wales, Australia
- Height: 196 cm (6 ft 5 in)
- Weight: 107 kg (16 st 12 lb)

Playing information
- Position: Wing, Centre, Second-row
Club
Years	Team	Pld	T	G	FG	P
2021–22	North Qld Cowboys	2	1	0	0	4
2023–25	Melbourne Storm	11	5	0	0	20
2026–	Brisbane Broncos	0	0	0	0	0
	Total	13	6	0	0	24
- Source: As of 29 August 2025

Kane Bradley (born 3 February 2000) is an Australian professional rugby league footballer who last played as a second-row, centre for the Melbourne Storm in the National Rugby League (NRL).

He previously played for the North Queensland Cowboys in the National Rugby League (NRL).

== Background ==
Bradley was born in Sydney, Australia.

He played his junior rugby league for Revesby Rhinos, Penshurst RSL, Chester Hill Hornets and Bankstown Sports and attended Bass High School.

== Playing career ==
=== Early career ===
In 2017 Bradley played for the Manly-Warringah Sea Eagles in the SG Ball Cup.

In 2018 he played for St. George in the SG Ball and was named in the New South Wales under-18 squad but did not play in their game against Queensland.

On 9 October 2018 Bradley signed with the Wests Tigers, joining their NRL squad on a two-year development contract.

In 2019 he played for the Tigers' Jersey Flegg Cup side and their NSW Cup affiliate, the Western Suburbs Magpies.

Bradley originally played as a second-rower, but moved to the flanks where his pace and aerial threat could be better used.

=== 2021 ===
On 5 January Bradley joined the North Queensland Cowboys on a two-year deal in a player swap deal with Tukimihia Simpkins. He began the season playing for the Mackay Cutters in the Queensland Cup.

In Round 19 of the 2021 NRL season Bradley made his NRL debut for North Queensland against the Melbourne Storm, scoring a try in the 20–16 defeat.

On 2 August it was announced that Bradley would miss the rest of the 2021 NRL season with a hand injury.

=== 2022 ===
Bradley spent the entire 2022 season playing for the Mackay Cutters and was released by the North Queensland club at the end of the season.

On 22 November he signed with the Brisbane Tigers in the Queensland Cup and underwent pre-season training with the Melbourne Storm, their NRL affiliate.

=== 2023 ===
In round 2 of the 2023 NRL season, Bradley made his Melbourne Storm debut against the Canterbury-Bankstown Bulldogs. He was presented with his debut jersey (cap 228). He also went onto win the 2023 Queensland Cup with the Brisbane Tigers where he started at centre and scored a try in the grand final.

=== 2026 ===
In Mid-December 2025, the Broncos confirmed that they had signed Bradley on a one year contract.
