= Runcorn Highfield ARLFC =

English amateur rugby league club

Club information
- Full name: Runcorn Highfield Amateur Rugby League Football Club
- Colours: Green and yellow
- Founded: 2005; 20 years ago

Current details
- Ground(s): Heath Park Playing Fields, Runcorn
- Competition: North West Men's League, Division 2
- 2024 season: 8th

Runcorn Highfield ARLFC, formerly Runcorn ARLFC, is a rugby league club based in Runcorn, Cheshire, England. They play in the North West Men's League.

== History ==
The club badge was the arms of the former Runcorn Urban District Council until a rebrand in 2021

The first rugby league club in Runcorn was Runcorn RFC which joined the Northern Union in 1895, just several days after it was founded. But the club folded in 1918.

Huyton RLFC moved to Runcorn FC's Canal Street in 1985 and became known as Runcorn Highfield. The club lasted in Runcorn until 1991 when it was renamed Highfield and moved to St Helens before being wound up in 1996.

The present club was founded in 2005 as Runcorn Vikings, joining the Rugby League Conference North West division. In 2006, they played in the Cheshire Division, which was effectively the old North West Division renamed to reflect where most of the teams were based.

In the 2007 season, Runcorn dropped the Vikings moniker. For the 2022 season, the club adopted the name 'Runcorn Highfield' last used by the defunct 1996 club.
