= Kai O'Donnell =

Australian rugby league footballer

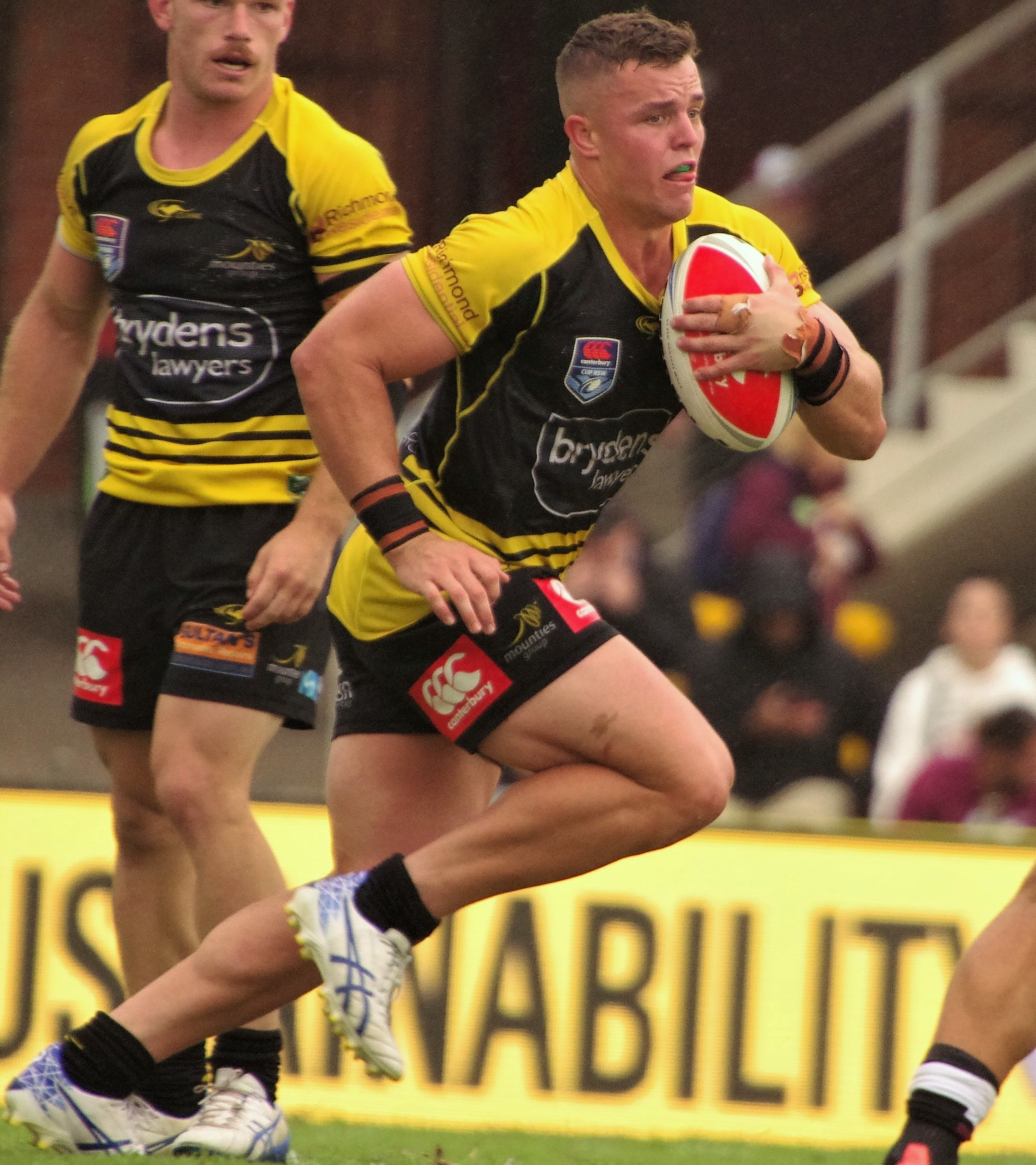

Personal information
- Born: 21 February 1999 (age 27) Brisbane, Queensland, Australia
- Height: 181 cm (5 ft 11 in)
- Weight: 98 kg (15 st 6 lb)

Playing information
- Position: Second-row, Lock
Club
| Years | Team | Pld | T | G | FG | P |
|---|---|---|---|---|---|---|
| 2020 | Canberra Raiders | 4 | 1 | 0 | 0 | 4 |
| 2022–24 | Leigh Leopards | 77 | 31 | 0 | 0 | 124 |
| 2025–26 | North Qld Cowboys | 25 | 0 | 0 | 0 | 0 |
| | Total | 106 | 32 | 0 | 0 | 128 |
- Source: As of 6 November 2026

Kai O'Donnell (born 21 February 1999) is an Australian professional rugby league footballer who last played as a second-row forward for the North Queensland Cowboys in the National Rugby League.

== Background ==
Born in Brisbane, Queensland, O'Donnell played his junior rugby league for the Proserpine Brahmans and attended Proserpine State High School before being signed by the Gold Coast Titans. While on the Gold Coast, he attended Palm Beach Currumbin State High School.

== Playing career ==
In 2015, O'Donnell played for the Mackay Cutters Cyril Connell Cup side. In 2017, he played for the Burleigh Bears Mal Meninga Cup side and moved up to their Hastings Deering Colts side in 2018. Later in 2018, O'Donnell made his debut for the Bears' Queensland Cup side.

In February 2019, O'Donnell came off the bench in the Gold Coast Titans pre-season trial loss to the North Queensland Cowboys. In April 2019, he made a mid-season move to the Canberra Raiders, joining their Jersey Flegg Cup side and starting at second-row in their Grand Final loss to the South Sydney Rabbitohs.

=== 2020 ===
In February, O'Donnell was a member of the Raiders' NRL Nines squad.

In round 9 of the 2020 NRL season, O'Donnell made his NRL debut for Canberra against the Melbourne Storm.

In round 20, he scored his first try in the top grade during a 38-28 victory over Cronulla-Sutherland at Kogarah Oval.

=== 2022 ===
On 8 April, O'Donnell signed a contract to join RFL Championship side Leigh.

=== 2023 ===
In the 2023 Challenge Cup quarter-final, O'Donnell was sent off for a spear tackle in Leigh's 34-14 victory over York RLFC. On 20 June, O'Donnell was given a six-game ban by the RFL over the incident. O'Donnell played 22 games for Leigh in the 2023 Super League season as the club finished fifth on the table and qualified for the playoffs.

=== 2024 ===
O'Donnell was highly praised by head coach Adrian Lam after scoring four tries in Leigh's 42-12 victory over Hull F.C. O'Donnell played 27 games for Leigh in the 2024 Super League season which saw the club finish fifth on the table.

=== 2025 ===
O'Donnell played 18 games for North Queensland in the 2025 NRL season as the club finished 12th on the table.

== Statistics ==
| Year | Team | Games | Tries | Pts |
|---|---|---|---|---|
| 2020 | Canberra Raiders | 4 | 1 | 4 |
| 2023 | Leigh Leopards | 43 | 16 | 64 |
| 2024 | Leigh Leopards | 43 | 16 | 64 |
| 2025 | North Queensland Cowboys | 18 | | |
| 2026 | North Queensland Cowboys | 5 | | |
| | Totals | 70 | 17 | 68 |
