= Adam Cook (rugby league, born 2000) =

Australian rugby league footballer

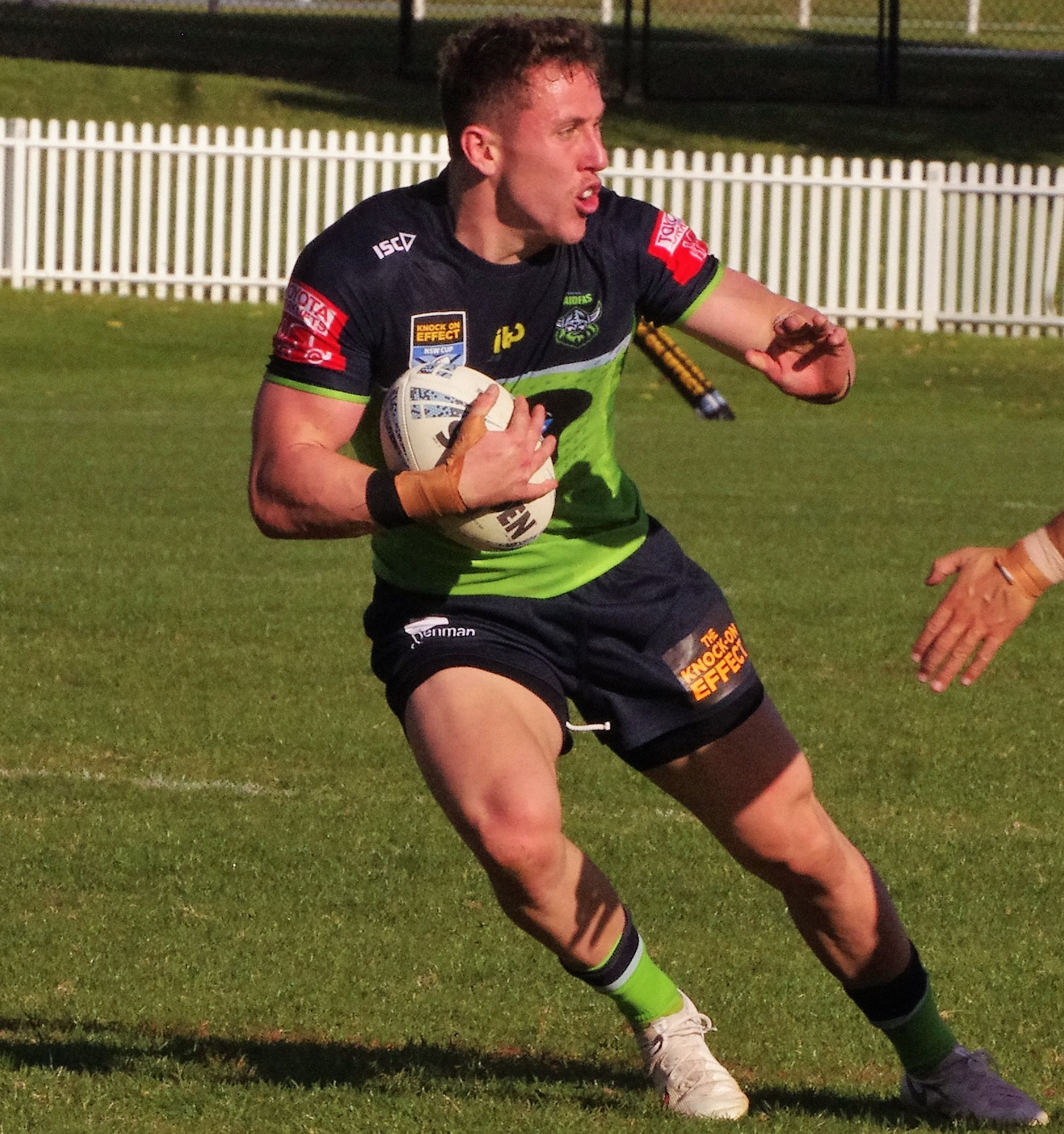

Personal information
- Born: 14 November 2000 (age 25) Charters Towers, Queensland, Australia
- Height: 6 ft 0 in (1.83 m)
- Weight: 13 st 12 lb (88 kg)

Playing information
- Position: Stand-off, Scrum-half
Club
Years	Team	Pld	T	G	FG	P
2020–25	Canberra Raiders	8	0	5	0	10
2026–	Leigh Leopards	30	6	101	1	227
	Total	38	6	106	1	237
- Source: As of 24 October 2025

Adam Cook (born 14 November 2000) is an Australian professional rugby league footballer who plays as a stand-off or scrum-half for the Leigh Leopards in the Super League.

== Background ==
Born in Charters Towers, Queensland, Cook played his junior rugby league for Townsville Brothers and attended Ignatius Park College.

== Playing career ==
=== Early career ===
In 2016, Cook played for the Townsville Blackhawks Cyril Connell Cup side, starting at halfback in their Grand Final win over the Souths Logan Magpies. In 2017, he moved up to the club's Mal Meninga Cup side. In 2018, after starting the season in the Mal Meninga Cup, Cook moved up to the Blackhawks' Hastings Deering Colts side, starting at halfback in their Grand Final loss to the Norths Devils. In 2019, Cook joined to the Blackhawks' Queensland Cup squad, but did not play a game, spending the entire season with the Colts team, where he was named the club's under-20 Player of the Year.

In October 2019, Cook signed with the Canberra Raiders.

=== 2020 ===
In round 20 of the 2020 NRL season, Cook made his NRL debut for Canberra against the Cronulla-Sutherland Sharks.

=== 2021 & 2022 ===
Between 2021 and 2022, Cook played for Redcliffe and Mackay in the Queensland Cup.

=== 2023 ===
In 2023, Cook was part of North Queensland's top 30 squad but continued to play for Mackay in the Queensland Cup. Cook had resigned with the Canberra Raiders for the 2024 season, and made his first appearance in the Pre Season Challenge, against the Parramatta Eels, scoring a try in an impressive win by the Capital club.

=== 2024 ===
Cook played a total of six matches for Canberra in the 2024 NRL season as the club finished 9th on the table.

=== 2025 ===
Cook was released by Canberra and signed a three-year deal with the Leigh Leopards in the Super League.
