= Laitia Moceidreke =

Professional rugby league footballer

Personal information
- Born: 9 June 2000 (age 26) Camperdown, New South Wales, Australia
- Height: 197 cm (6 ft 6 in)
- Weight: 101 kg (15 st 13 lb)

Playing information
- Position: Wing
Club
Years	Team	Pld	T	G	FG	P
2021	North Qld Cowboys	1	1	0	0	4
- Source: As of 13 October 2024
- Education: Matraville Sports High School
- Relatives: Sitiveni Moceidreke (brother)

Laitia Moceidreke (born 9 June 2000) is an Australian professional rugby league footballer. His position is wing.

He previously played for the North Queensland Cowboys in the National Rugby League.

== Background ==
Born in Camperdown, New South Wales, Moceidreke is of Fijian descent. He is the younger brother of former South Sydney Rabbitohs player Sitiveni Moceidreke.

He attended Matraville Sports High School and played his junior rugby league for the St George Dragons.

He has a twin brother Waisea, who played for Australia in Physical Disability Rugby League World Cup in 2026.

== Playing career ==
=== Early career ===
In 2020, Moceidreke played for the Moorebank Rams in the Sydney Shield.

=== 2021 ===
In 2021, Moceidreke joined the Canterbury-Bankstown Bulldogs, playing for their Jersey Flegg Cup side.

In June, Moceidreke signed with the North Queensland Cowboys on a two-year deal beginning in 2022 but was granted an immediate release to join the club for the 2021 NRL season.

In round 23 of the 2021 NRL season, Moceidreke made his NRL debut for the North Queensland club against the Parramatta Eels, scoring a try in a 32–16 loss.

=== 2023 ===
After spending the majority of his two seasons with the Cowboys playing for their Queensland Cup feeder sides, the Mackay Cutters and Townsville Blackhawks, Moceidreke joined the Newcastle Knights in May, playing for their New South Wales Cup side.

=== 2024 ===
In 2024, Moceidreke's contract with the Knights was upgraded to an NRL development contract.

== American football career ==
In December 2024, Moceidreke left rugby league to pursue an American football career. On 9 December 2024, he was selected for the National Football League's International Player Pathway (IPP) program.
