= Rugby League Divisional Premiership =

Competition for British rugby league clubs

Divisional Premiership
- Sport: Rugby league
- Inaugural season: 1986–87
- Ceased: 1997
- Replaced by: Championship Grand Final
- Country: England
- Last winners: Huddersfield Giants (1997)
- Most titles: Oldham (2 titles); Sheffield Eagles (2 titles); Salford (2 titles)

The Rugby League Divisional Premiership (sometimes called the Second Division Premiership) was a competition for British rugby league clubs in the Second Division of the Rugby Football League, which operated between 1986 and 1997.

== History ==
The Second Division Premiership was introduced during the 1986–87 season. The format was the same as the Premiership competition used for First Division clubs, with the teams finishing in the top eight in the league competing in an end-of-season knockout tournament. The final was staged at Old Trafford as a curtain raiser for the First Division Premiership final, with the man of the match being awarded the Tom Bergin Trophy.

When a Third Division was introduced in the 1991–92 season, the competition was renamed the Divisional Premiership, and was expanded to include both Second and Third Division teams. The competition returned to the previous format when the league reverted to two divisions in the 1993–94 season.

Following the switch to summer rugby, a shortened four-team format was used for the 1996 competition. In 1998, the competition was replaced by a play-off system which would determine promotion to the Super League. The Tom Bergin Trophy continued to be used as the Grand Final's man of the match award.

== Divisional Premiership winners ==
Season	Competition	Winners	Score	Runners-up	Venue
Winter era
1986–87	1986–87 Divisional Premiership	Swinton	27–10	Hunslet	Old Trafford, Manchester
1987–88	1987–88 Divisional Premiership	Oldham	28–26	Featherstone Rovers	Old Trafford, Manchester
1988–89	1988–89 Divisional Premiership	Sheffield Eagles	43–18	Swinton	Old Trafford, Manchester
1989–90	1989–90 Divisional Premiership	Oldham	30–29	Hull Kingston Rovers	Old Trafford, Manchester
1990–91	1990–91 Divisional Premiership	Salford	27–20	Halifax	Old Trafford, Manchester
1991–92	1991–92 Divisional Premiership	Sheffield Eagles	34–20	Oldham	Old Trafford, Manchester
1992–93	1992–93 Divisional Premiership	Featherstone Rovers	20–16	Workington Town	Old Trafford, Manchester
1993–94	1993–94 Divisional Premiership	Workington Town	30–22	London Crusaders	Old Trafford, Manchester
1994–95	1994–95 Divisional Premiership	Keighley Cougars	26–6	Huddersfield Giants	Old Trafford, Manchester
Summer era
1996	1996 Divisional Premiership	Salford Reds	19–6	Keighley Cougars	Old Trafford, Manchester
1997	1997 Divisional Premiership	Huddersfield Giants	18–0	Hull Sharks	Old Trafford, Manchester

== See also ==
- Championship Grand Final
