= Joe Grima (rugby league) =

New Zealand rugby league footballer

Personal information
- Born: 18 September 1960 (age 64); New Zealand

Playing information
- Position: Prop
Club
Years	Team	Pld	T	G	FG	P
1985–88	Swinton	47	6	0	0	24
1988–92	Widnes	137	11	0	0	44
1992–94	Keighley Cougars	37	6	0	0	24
	Total	221	23	0	0	92

Joe Grima (born 18 September 1960) is a New Zealand former professional rugby league footballer who played for Swinton, Widnes and the Keighley Cougars.

== Playing career ==
=== Swinton ===
Grima was signed by Swinton in October 1985. In 1987, he helped the team win promotion from the Second Division, and also played in the inaugural Second Division Premiership final, scoring a try in a 27–10 win against Hunslet.

=== Widnes ===
Grima spent four years at Widnes, and was part of the squad that won the 1989 World Club Challenge against the Canberra Raiders.

Grima played right-prop in Widnes' 6–12 defeat by Wigan in the 1988–89 John Player Special Trophy Final during the 1988–89 season at Burnden Park, Bolton on Saturday 7 January 1989, and was a substitute in the 24–0 victory over Leeds in the 1991–92 Regal Trophy Final during the 1991–92 season at Central Park, Wigan on Saturday 11 January 1992.

== Personal life ==
After retiring, Grima lived in Skipton, North Yorkshire, before later returning to his native New Zealand.
