= 1994–95 Rugby League Divisional Premiership =

1994–95 Divisional Premiership Trophy
- Structure: National knockout championship
- Teams: 8
- Winners: Keighley Cougars
- Runners-up: Huddersfield

The 1994–95 Rugby League Divisional Premiership was the 9th end-of-season Rugby League Divisional Premiership competition and the last in the winter era.

The competition was contested by the top eight teams in the second Division. The winners were Keighley Cougars.

== First round ==
Date	Team one	Score	Team two
7 May 1995	Batley	20–16	Dewsbury
7 May 1995	Huddersfield	36–10	Rochdale Hornets
7 May 1995	Keighley Cougars	42–16	Hull Kingston Rovers
8 May 1995	London Broncos	28–1	Whitehaven

== Semi-finals ==
Date	Team one	Score	Team two
14 May 1995	Batley	6–13	Huddersfield
14 May 1995	Keighley Cougars	38–4	London Broncos

== Final ==
21 May 1995

Keighley Cougars	26 – 6	Huddersfield
Tries: Wood, Pinkney, Powell, Eyres; Goals: Irving (4); Drop goals: Ramshaw (2)		Goals: Pearce (2); Drop goals: Kerry, Austin

Old Trafford, Manchester
Referee: Russell Smith (Castleford)
Player of the Match: Martin Wood

1	Andre Stoop
2	Andy Eyres
3	Nick Pinkney
4	Simon Irving (c)
5	Keith Dixon
6	Daryl Powell
7	Darren Appleby
8	Brendan Hill
9	Jason Ramshaw
10	Ian Gately
11	Darren Fleary
12	Gareth Cochrane
13	Martin Wood
Substitutes:
14	David Larder
15	Shane Tupaea
Coach:
Phil Larder

1	Phil Hellewell
2	Ben Barton
3	Darrall Shelford
4	Greg Austin (c)
5	Simon Reynolds
6	Dean Hanger
7	Steve Kerry
8	Dave King
9	Lee St Hilaire
10	Andy Pucill
11	Basil Richards
12	Gary Senior
13	Greg Pearce
Substitutes:
14	Mick Taylor
15	Gary Coulter
Coach:
George Fairbairn

== See also ==
- 1994–95 Rugby Football League season
