= 1991–92 Rugby League Divisional Premiership =

1991–92 Divisional Premiership Trophy
- Structure: National knockout championship
- Teams: 12
- Winners: Sheffield Eagles
- Runners-up: Oldham

The 1991–92 Rugby League Divisional Premiership was the 6th end-of-season Rugby League Divisional Premiership competition.

With the addition of a Third Division to the British professional rugby league system, the competition was expanded to 12 teams, and was contested by the top four teams in the second Division and the top eight teams in the third Division. The winners were Sheffield Eagles.

== First round ==
Date	Team one	Score	Team two
20 April 1992	Batley	46–0	Barrow
21 April 1992	Bramley	18–18	Keighley Cougars
21 April 1992	Dewsbury	24–6	Doncaster
21 April 1992	Huddersfield	13–6	Hunslet

=== Replay ===
Date	Team one	Score	Team two
23 April 1992	Keighley Cougars	26–23	Bramley

== Second round ==
Date	Team one	Score	Team two
25 April 1992	Sheffield Eagles	72–14	Keighley Cougars
26 April 1992	Leigh	6–15	Batley
26 April 1992	London Crusaders	14–4	Huddersfield
26 April 1992	Oldham	36–18	Dewsbury

== Semi-finals ==
Date	Team one	Score	Team two
10 May 1992	Oldham	22–14	London Crusaders
10 May 1992	Sheffield Eagles	36–22	Batley

== Final ==
17 May 1992

Sheffield Eagles	34 – 20	Oldham
Tries: Powell (3), Mycoe, Lumb, Mumby; Goals: Aston (5)		Tries: Platt, Byrne, Newton, Ranson; Goals: Martyn (2)

Old Trafford, Manchester
Referee: Stuart Cummings (Widnes)
Player of the Match: Daryl Powell

1	David Mycoe
2	Mark Gamson
3	Charlie McAlister
4	Daryl Powell
5	David Plange
6	Richard Price
7	Mark Aston
8	Paul Broadbent
9	Mick Cook (c)
10	Hugh Waddell
11	Dale Laughton
12	Ian Hughes
13	Anthony Farrell
Substitutes:
14	Tim Lumb
15	Keith Mumby
Coach:
Gary Hetherington

1	Duncan Platt
2	Scott Ranson
3	Vince Nicklin
4	Iva Ropati
5	Sean Tyrer
6	Richard Russell (c)
7	Tommy Martyn
8	Ian Sherratt
9	Richard Pachniuk
10	Keith Newton
11	Chris Joynt
12	Shane Tupaea
13	Ged Byrne
Substitutes:
14	Steve Warburton
15	Tim Street
Coach:
Peter Tunks

== See also ==
- 1991–92 Rugby Football League season
