= 1990–91 Rugby League Divisional Premiership =

1990–91 Divisional Premiership Trophy
- Structure: National knockout championship
- Teams: 8
- Winners: Salford
- Runners-up: Halifax

The 1990–91 Rugby League Divisional Premiership was the 5th end-of-season Rugby League Divisional Premiership competition.

The competition was contested by the top eight teams in the second Division. The winners were Salford.

== First round ==
Date	Team one	Score	Team two
21 April 1991	Halifax	42–24	Fulham
21 April 1991	Ryedale-York	6–11	Leigh
21 April 1991	Salford	26–12	Carlisle
21 April 1991	Swinton	13–19	Workington Town

== Semi-finals ==
Date	Team one	Score	Team two
5 May 1991	Halifax	32–8	Leigh
5 May 1991	Salford	9–9	Workington Town

=== Replay ===
Date	Team one	Score	Team two
7 May 1991	Workington Town	6–26	Salford

== Final ==
12 May 1991

Salford	27 – 20	Halifax
Tries: Kerry (2), Evans, Gilfillan; Goals: Kerry (4); Drop goals: Kerry, Cassidy, Lee		Tries: Southernwood, Hill, Wilson, Wood; Goals: Platt (2)

Old Trafford, Manchester
Referee: Brian Galtress (Bradford)
Player of the Match: Steve Kerry

1	Steve Gibson
2	Tex Evans
3	John Gilfillan
4	Martin Birkett
5	Adrian Hadley
6	Frank Cassidy
7	Steve Kerry
8	Mick Worrall
9	Mark Lee
10	Shane Hansen
11	Arthur Bradshaw
12	Ian Blease (c)
13	Andy Burgess
Substitutes:
14	Mike Dean
15	Ian Sherratt
Coach:
Kevin Tamati

1	Steve Smith
2	Martin Wood
3	Warren Wilson
4	Greg Austin
5	Matthew Silva
6	John Lyons
7	Roy Southernwood
8	Brendan Hill (c)
9	Jason Ramshaw
10	Peter Bell
11	Peter Brown
12	Richard Milner
13	Mick Keebles
Substitutes:
14	Alan Platt
15	Mick Scott
Coach:
Peter Roe

== See also ==
- 1990–91 Rugby Football League season
