= 1988–89 Rugby League Divisional Premiership =

1988–89 Divisional Premiership Trophy
- Structure: National knockout championship
- Teams: 8
- Winners: Sheffield Eagles
- Runners-up: Swinton

The 1988–89 Rugby League Divisional Premiership was the 3rd end-of-season Rugby League Divisional Premiership competition.

The competition was contested by the top eight teams in the second Division. The winners were Sheffield Eagles.

== First round ==
Date	Team one	Score	Team two
23 April 1989	Barrow	30–5	Whitehaven
23 April 1989	Leigh	38–12	Keighley
23 April 1989	Sheffield Eagles	28–10	Doncaster
23 April 1989	York	4–4	Swinton

=== Replay ===
Date	Team one	Score	Team two
25 April 1989	Swinton	17–16	York

== Semi-finals ==
Date	Team one	Score	Team two
7 May 1989	Barrow	6–9	Sheffield Eagles
7 May 1989	Leigh	8–20	Swinton

== Final ==
14 May 1989

Sheffield Eagles	43 – 18	Swinton
Tries: Powell (3), Broadbent, Aston, Cook, McDermott; Goals: Aston (7); Drop goals: Aston		Tries: Frodsham, Melling, Ranson; Goals: Myler (3)

Old Trafford, Manchester
Referee: Robin Whitfield (Widnes)
Player of the Match: Mark Aston

1	Mark Gamson
2	Phil Cartwright
3	Andy Dickinson
4	Daryl Powell (c)
5	Andy Young
6	Mark Aston
7	David Close
8	Paul Broadbent
9	Mick Cook
10	Gary Van Bellen
11	Sonny Nickle
12	Mark Fleming
13	Warren Smiles
Substitutes:
14	Steve Evans
15	Paul McDermott
Coach:
Gary Hetherington

1	Paul Topping
2	Scott Ranson
3	Mark Viller
4	Steve Snape
5	Derek Bate
6	Tommy Frodsham
7	Tony Hewitt
8	Frank Mooney
9	Alex Melling
10	Steve O'Neill
11	Gary Ainsworth
12	John Allen
13	John Myler (c)
Substitutes:
14	Dave Maloney
15	John Horrocks
Coach:
Frank Barrow

== See also ==
- 1988–89 Rugby Football League season
