= Kieron Purtill =

Englisg RL coach and former professional rugby league footballer

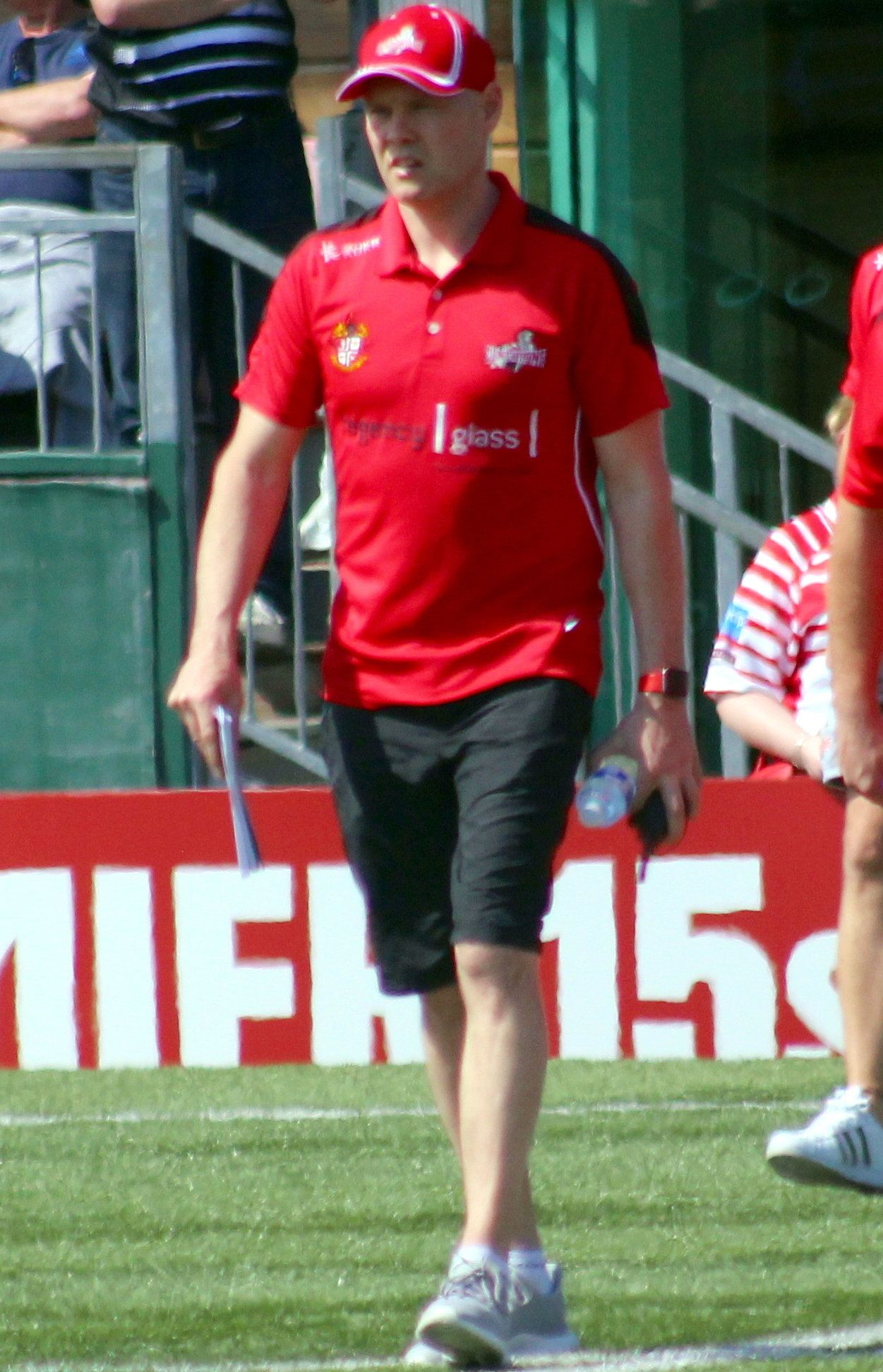

Personal information
- Born: 12 February 1977 (age 49) Wigan, Greater Manchester, England

Playing information
- Position: Centre, Scrum-half
Club
Years	Team	Pld	T	G	FG	P
1999–02	Leigh Centurions	57	15	0	1	61

Coaching information
Club
Years	Team	Gms	W	D	L	W%
2008–09	Huddersfield Giants	12	6	0	6	50
2018–19	Leigh Centurions	10	8	0	2	80
2019	Widnes Vikings	34	19	0	15	56
	Total	56	33	0	23	59
Representative
Years	Team	Gms	W	D	L	W%
2010	Canada
2012	England Knights	3	3	0	0	100
- Source: As of 30 April 2018

Kieron Purtill was most recently the head coach of the Widnes Vikings in the Championship before resigning in October 2019 after signing a 1 year contract extension only two months prior. He is the former head coach of both the Canada national rugby league team and the England Knights/Elite Development Squad.

== Background ==
Purtill was born in Wigan, Greater Manchester, England.

== Playing career ==
A former scrum half for the Wigan Warriors, Huddersfield Giants and Leigh Centurions, Purtill was forced to retire from playing due to injury and moved into coaching.

== Coaching career ==
He started as a coach at St. Helens before joining Huddersfield Giants as an assistant coach in 2005. At Huddersfield, he worked under head coach Jon Sharp, who rated him as one of the best young coaches in the game. Following Sharp's departure from the club in 2008, Purtill had a brief spell as caretaker coach alongside Paul Anderson. He then moved to St Helens where he worked under Michael Potter and then Royce Simmons. He also became head coach of the Canada Wolverines rugby league team and in 2011 the England Knights team. He also did a PG Dip in Elite Coaching Practice at the University of Central Lancashire. He parted company with St Helens along with Royce Simmons on 18 March 2012 following a run of 5 games without a win. He has since been linked with a return to Huddersfield or to Bradford Bulls, both in assistant roles.
