= 1986–87 Rugby League Divisional Premiership =

1986–87 Divisional Premiership Trophy
- Structure: National knockout championship
- Teams: 8
- Winners: Swinton
- Runners-up: Hunslet

The 1986–87 Rugby League Divisional Premiership was the 1st end-of-season Rugby League Divisional Premiership competition.

The competition was contested by the top eight teams in the second Division. Swinton became the champions after defeating Hunslet 27–10 in the final.

== First round ==
Date	Team one	Score	Team two
26 April 1987	Doncaster	18–30	Rochdale Hornets
26 April 1987	Hunslet	54–0	Carlisle
26 April 1987	Swinton	59–14	Bramley
26 April 1987	Whitehaven	29–24	Sheffield Eagles

== Semi-finals ==
Date	Team one	Score	Team two
10 May 1987	Hunslet	32–8	Rochdale Hornets
10 May 1987	Swinton	12–6	Whitehaven

== Final ==
17 May 1987

Swinton	27 – 10	Hunslet
Tries: Bate, Derbyshire, Grima, Lee, Ainsworth; Goals: Rippon (3); Drop goals: L. Holliday		Tries: Bateman (2); Goals: Platt

Old Trafford, Manchester
Player of the Match: Gary Ainsworth

1	Mark Viller
2	Derek Bate
3	Paul Topping
4	Jeff Brown
5	Andy Rippon
6	Steve Snape
7	Martin Lee
8	Joe Grima
9	Gary Ainsworth
10	Roby Muller
11	Alan Derbyshire
12	Mike Holliday
13	Les Holliday (c)
Substitutes:
14	John Allen
15	Alan Ratcliffe
Coach:
Bill Holliday & Mike Peers

1	Andy Kay
2	Phil Tate
3	Colin Penola
4	Jimmy Irvine
5	Warren Wilson
6	Ged Coates
7	Graham King
8	Andy Sykes
9	Phil Gibson
10	Andy Bateman
11	Alan Platt
12	Chris Bowden
13	Graeme Jennings (c)
Substitutes:
14	Gary Senior
15	Keith Mason
Coach:
Peter Jarivs & David Ward

== See also ==
- 1986–87 Rugby Football League season
