= 1994–95 Rugby Football League season =

- League: Championship
- Duration: 30 Rounds
- Teams: First Division: 16; Second Division: 16
- Broadcast partners: Sky Sports

First Division
- Champions: Wigan (16th title)
- Premiership winners: Wigan
- Man of Steel: Denis Betts
- Top point-scorer: Frano Botica (408)
- Top try-scorer: Martin Offiah (53)
- Demoted to Third Division: Doncaster

Promotion and relegation
- Relegated to Second Division: Featherstone Rovers; Salford; Wakefield Trinity; Widnes; Hull

Second Division
- Champions: Keighley Cougars

Promotion and relegation
- Promoted from Second Division: London Broncos
- Relegated to new Third Division: Hull Kingston Rovers; Ryedale-York; Hunslet; Leigh; Swinton; Bramley; Carlisle; Barrow; Highfield

The 1994–95 Rugby Football League season was the 100th ever season of professional rugby league football in Britain. Sixteen teams competed from August 1994 until May 1995 for a number of titles, primarily the Stones Bitter Championship.

== Season summary ==
- Stones Bitter League Champions: Wigan (16th title)
- Silk Cut Challenge Cup Winners: Wigan (30-10 v Leeds)
- Stones Bitter Premiership Trophy Winners: Wigan (69-12 v Leeds)
  - Harry Sunderland Trophy: Kris Radlinski
- Regal Trophy Winners: Wigan (7 - 40-10 v Warrington)
- 2nd Division Champions: Keighley

The record for most points scored by one team in a match was broken by Huddersfield when they clocked up 142 against Blackpool Gladiators' 4 in a Regal Trophy match on 26 November 1994. This is also the record for widest margin.

The 1995 Man of Steel Award for the player of the season went to Wigan's Denis Betts. Wigan also set a new record for most points in all matches in one season with 1,735 from 45 matches as follows:

- Division One Championship: 1,148 (from 30 games)
- Challenge Cup 230 (from 6 games)
- Regal Trophy 170 (from 5 games)
- Premiership Trophy 167 (from 3 games)
- Tour match (Australia) 20 (from 1 game)

=== Rule changes ===
The following rule changes were introduced this season by the referees' coaching director, Greg McCallum:

- Referees were given the power to put a player suspected of foul play "on report" with the incident to be reviewed later by the disciplinary panel. The system was based on the one already operating in Australian rugby league. Referees signalled that an incident had been put "on report" by crossing their raised arms above their heads.
- In-goal judges were trialled, these two additional match officials are positioned behind the dead-ball line at each end of the playing field and aim to aid the referee in judging if a try has been scored. The in-goal judges had been used in Australia for two years.
- McCallum ordered referees to penalise defending players lifting attackers in the tackle in a way that could lead to an illegal spear tackle.

Leeds' Gary Mercer (dangerous throw), Sheffield Eagles' Paul Broadbent and Doncaster's Gordon Lynch (tripping) became the first players cited under the reporting system to be found to have a case to answer.

=== Structural reform ===
==== Framing the Future ====
In prevision of the RFL's impending centennial season, a state-of-the-league report titled Framing the Future was produced by its board of directors, based on the findings of a one-year investigation commissioned from the Global Sports Marketing agency, with the aim of propelling the financially shaky sport into a new era. Among the more consensual recommendations were the hiring of at least one full-time press officer, which The Daily Telegraph's John Whalley found badly needed, pointing that only six First Division clubs allowed the BBC's Ceefax teletext service to relay their game results. More controversially, the plan would nullify the existing revenue sharing scheme directed at second-tier teams, give two-to-one voting powers to top-flight clubs and limit promotion opportunities to one spot (the second would be conditioned to a playoff), which would likely not be guaranteed due to the implementation of more stringent stadium standards in the elite.

Those proposals drew the ire of many smaller clubs, with only one second-division member, the big-market London Broncos, reportedly in favour. The rebel faction convened in Rochdale and asked the vote to be delayed. Opposition leaders Batley and Ryedale-York proposed several amendments. Concurrently, the leading clubs also hardened their stance: Wigan threatened to form a breakaway loop, however it was accepted that only three or four clubs could afford to follow them. Following a protracted meeting in Leeds, a compromise was found. It gave three votes to top-flight clubs, two to second-tier clubs, and one to some eligible third-tier clubs, while revenue sharing would be phased out within four years. However, the two promotion spots would be preserved. Seventy-five per cent of a projected £25 million public grant for stadium improvements was also allocated to top-tier members. While it was decided to rebrand the First Division as "Premier League" in 1995–96, the number of teams remained at sixteen. Those changes were viewed by some as underwhelming. Star player Paul Hulme was unimpressed by the new policy and criticised the lack of obligations placed on clubs regarding player development, compared to what existed in Australia.

==== Super League Europe ====
Throughout the 1994–95 season, news of media mogul Rupert Murdoch's interest in an extension of his projected Australian circuit to Europe made their way to the press, and were formalised during an RFL Council meeting on 5 April 1995. Three days later, the clubs unanimously voted to accept Murdoch's proposal, effectively superseding much of the previous fall's moderate reform. Per the agreement, the final 1995–96 First Division season would serve as a transition year, and use a condensed roster of teams which would prefigure the Super League format. The possible aggregation of local rivals into a single regional side to reach the desired team quota—which was later rescinded—led to some protests, including a pitch invasion during half-time of the East Lancashire derby between Salford and Oldham on 14 April.

== Tables ==
=== First Division ===
In preparation for the switch to summer for the Super League, the position teams finished would determine what division they would play next season. The team finishing bottom would be relegated to the new Third Division and teams finishing 11th to 15th would be relegated to the existing Second Division.

Pos	Team	Pld	W	D	L	PF	PA	PD	Pts	Qualification or relegation
1	Wigan (C)	30	28	0	2	1148	386	+762	56	Qualification for the Premiership first round
2	Leeds	30	24	1	5	863	526	+337	49	Qualification for the Premiership first round
3	Castleford	30	20	2	8	872	564	+308	42	Qualification for the Premiership first round
4	St Helens	30	20	1	9	893	640	+253	41	Qualification for the Premiership first round
5	Halifax	30	18	2	10	782	566	+216	38	Qualification for the Premiership first round
6	Warrington	30	18	2	10	753	570	+183	38	Qualification for the Premiership first round
7	Bradford Northern	30	17	1	12	811	650	+161	35	Qualification for the Premiership first round
8	Sheffield Eagles	30	15	0	15	646	699	−53	30	Qualification for the Premiership first round
9	Workington Town	30	12	1	17	538	743	−205	25	
10	Oldham	30	11	1	18	534	746	−212	23	
11	Featherstone Rovers (R)	30	10	1	19	582	687	−105	21	Relegation to Second Division
12	Salford (R)	30	10	1	19	613	775	−162	21	Relegation to Second Division
13	Wakefield Trinity (R)	30	9	0	21	434	807	−373	18	Relegation to Second Division
14	Widnes (R)	30	8	1	21	481	767	−286	17	Relegation to Second Division
15	Hull F.C. (R)	30	7	1	22	594	880	−286	15	Relegation to Second Division
16	Doncaster (R)	30	5	1	24	469	1007	−538	11	Relegation to Third Division

Rules for classification: 1) Points; 2) Points difference; 3) Number of points scored;
(C) Champions; (R) Relegated

=== Second Division ===
The teams finishing in the top 7 would remain in the Second Division. London Broncos were promoted into the First Division as they were to be part of the new Super League in 1996. The remaining teams were relegated to form the new Third Division.

Pos	Team	Pld	W	D	L	PF	PA	PD	Pts	Promotion, qualification or relegation
1	Keighley Cougars (C)	30	23	2	5	974	337	+637	48	Qualified for Divisional Premiership first round
2	Batley	30	23	0	7	754	423	+331	46	Qualified for Divisional Premiership first round
3	Huddersfield	30	19	3	8	870	539	+331	41	Qualified for Divisional Premiership first round
4	London Broncos (P)	30	20	1	9	732	480	+252	41	Qualified for Divisional Premiership first round
5	Whitehaven	30	19	0	11	766	507	+259	38	Qualified for Divisional Premiership first round
6	Rochdale Hornets	30	18	0	12	805	544	+261	36	Qualified for Divisional Premiership first round
7	Dewsbury	30	17	1	12	744	538	+206	35	Qualified for Divisional Premiership first round
8	Hull Kingston Rovers (R)	30	16	1	13	824	516	+308	33	Relegation to Third Division; Qualified for Divisional Premiership first round
9	Ryedale-York (R)	30	15	2	13	720	602	+118	32	Relegation to Third Division
10	Hunslet (R)	30	16	0	14	611	783	−172	32	Relegation to Third Division
11	Leigh (R)	30	12	0	18	622	787	−165	24	Relegation to Third Division
12	Swinton (R)	30	12	0	18	576	768	−192	24	Relegation to Third Division
13	Bramley (R)	30	10	0	20	554	655	−101	20	Relegation to Third Division
14	Carlisle (R)	30	8	0	22	546	877	−331	16	Relegation to Third Division
15	Barrow (R)	30	6	0	24	449	811	−362	12	Relegation to Third Division
16	Highfield (R)	30	1	0	29	224	1604	−1380	2	Relegation to Third Division

Rules for classification: 1) Points; 2) Points difference; 3) Number of points scored;
(C) Champions; (P) Promoted; (R) Relegated

== Regal Trophy ==
Key
† Replayed - 1st match in brackets

Second round
Hull	26
Barrow	16
Wigan	34
Rochdale Hornets	12
Batley	36
Ryedale-York	8
Huddersfield	11
St Helens	52
Workington Town	24
Wakefield Trinity	8
Leeds	54
Swinton	24
Carlisle	16
Dewsbury	30
Castleford	32
Halifax	26
Highfield	2
Widnes	50
Oldham	28
Hull Kingston Rovers	0
Whitehaven	18
Featherstone Rovers	12
Bradford Northern	32
St Esteve	6
Keighley	28
Bramley	4
Sheffield Eagles	46
Leigh	10
Salford	16
London Broncos	14
Warrington	44
Doncaster	14

Third round
Hull	14
Wigan	38
Batley†	(22); 22
St Helens†	(22); 50
Workington Town	14
Leeds	18
Dewsbury	2
Castleford	30
Widnes	20
Oldham	6
Whitehaven	14
Bradford Northern	34
Keighley	26
Sheffield Eagles	10
Salford	24
Warrington	31

Quarter-final
Wigan	24
St Helens	22
Leeds	14
Castleford	34
Widnes	23
Bradford Northern	10
Keighley	18
Warrington	20

Semi-final
Wigan	34
Castleford	6
Widnes	4
Warrington	30

Final
Wigan	40
Warrington	10

== Challenge Cup ==
Rounds One and Two were contested between amateur clubs only. Millom were the biggest winners in Round One when they defeated Northampton Knights by 62–4. The biggest win in Round Two was Wigan St Patricks who defeated Crown Malet 42–6.

Round Three saw teams from Division Two matched at home against an amateur opponent. There was one shock result, when Beverley beat Highfield by 27–4. Dewsbury recorded the most points in Round Three when they defeated Kells by 72–12, though the biggest margin of victory went to Keighley who beat Chorley 68–0.

In Round Four, the Division One sides entered the competition with no seeding. There were two shock results when Huddersfield defeated Halifax 36-30 and Whitehaven beat Wakefield Trinity by 24–12. Hunslet drew with Salford 32–32 to take them to a replay before going down by 52–10.

Results from Fifth round:

Fifth round
Batley	4
Wigan	70
Sheffield Eagles	7
Widnes	19
Warrington	6
Oldham	17
Keighley	0
Huddersfield	30
Hull Kingston Rovers	14
Whitehaven	18
Salford	10
Featherstone Rovers	30
Workington Town	94
Leigh	4
Leeds	44
Ryedale-York	14

Quarter-finals
Widnes	12
Wigan	26
Oldham	23
Huddersfield	12
Whitehaven	14
Featherstone Rovers	42
Leeds	50
Workington Town	16

Semi-finals
Wigan	48
Oldham	20
Leeds	39
Featherstone Rovers	22

Final
Wigan	30
Leeds	10

== Statistics ==
The following are the top points scorers in all competitions in the 1994–95 season.

Most tries

Player	Team	Tries
Martin Offiah	Wigan	53
Greg Austin	Huddersfield	52
Nick Pinkney	Keighley Cougars	46
Ellery Hanley	Leeds	41
David Plange	Hull Kingston Rovers	35
Mike Pechey	Whitehaven	34
Gary Connolly	Wigan	30
John Bentley	Halifax	29
Alan Hunte	St. Helens	29
Scott Limb	Hunslet	29

Most goals (including drop goals)

Player	Team	Goals
Frano Botica	Wigan	186
Bobbie Goulding	St. Helens	158
Simon Irving	Keighley Cougars	152
Martin Strett	Rochdale Hornets	150
John Schuster	Halifax	144
Mike Fletcher	Hull Kingston Rovers	142
Graham Holroyd	Leeds	135
Deryck Fox	Bradford Northern	131
Simon Wilson	Batley	127
Jonathan Davies	Warrington	126

== Kangaroo Tour ==
The months of October and November also saw the appearance of the Australian team in Britain on their 1994 Kangaroo Tour. Other than the three test Ashes series against Great Britain (won 2–1 by Australia), The Kangaroos played and won matches against 8 Championship teams (Leeds, Wigan, Castleford, Halifax, Sheffield, St Helens, Warrington and Bradford Northern), 1 county side (Cumbria), 1 game against the Great Britain U/21 side and non-test international against Wales in Cardiff. The team was coached by 1973 tourist and 1978 tour captain Bob Fulton and was captained by Mal Meninga who was making his record 4th Kangaroo Tour as a player.

Illawarra Steelers winger Rod Wishart, was the leading point scorer on the tour with a modern record of 174 points (beating Michael O'Connor's 170 from 1986) from 8 tries and 71 goals. For the second Kangaroo Tour in a row, Cronulla-Sutherland outside back Andrew Ettingshausen was the leading try scorer with 15, the same number he had scored in 1990.

Great Britain's win in the first test at Wembley emulated the Lions first test win over the Kangaroos in 1990 and was the Kangaroos only loss of the tour. Wembley also saw the largest ever rugby league test attendance (not including World Cup games) in Great Britain with 57,034 on hand. This beat the opening test of the 1990 Tour at Wembley that had attracted a crowd of 54,569.

game	Date	Result	Venue	Attendance
1	2 October	Australia def. Cumbria 52–8	Derwent Park, Workington	4,277
2	5 October	Australia def. Leeds 48–6	Headingley, Leeds	18,581
3	8 October	Australia def. Wigan 30–20	Central Park, Wigan	20,057
4	12 October	Australia def. Castleford 38–12	Wheldon Road, Castleford	11,073
5	16 October	Australia def. Halifax 22–10	Thrum Hall, Halifax	8,352
6	22 October	Great Britain def. Australia 8–4	Wembley Stadium, London	57,034
7	26 October	Australia def. Sheffield Eagles 80–2	Don Valley Stadium, Sheffield	7,423
8	30 October	Australia def. Wales 46–4	Ninian Park, Cardiff	8,729
9	1 November	Australia def. St Helens 32–14	Knowsley Road, St Helens	13,911
10	6 November	Australia def. Great Britain 38–8	Old Trafford, Manchester	43,930
11	9 November	Australia def. Warrington 24–0	Wilderspool Stadium, Warrington	11,244
12	13 November	Australia def. Bradford Northern 40–0	Odsal Stadium, Bradford	9,080
13	15 November	Australia def. Great Britain U/21 54–10	Gateshead International Stadium, Gateshead	4,118
14	20 November	Australia def. Great Britain 23–4	Elland Road, Leeds	39,468
