= Matthew Silva (coach) =

Wales international rugby league & union footballer & coach

Personal information
- Full name: Matthew Silva
- Born: 15 March 1970 (age 56) Tremorfa, Cardiff, Wales

Playing information

Rugby union
- Position: Number Eight, Fly-half, Centre, Wing, Fullback
Club
Years	Team	Pld	T	G	FG	P
	St Albans RFC
	Llandaff RFC
≤1988–≥88	Newport RFC
≤1989–91	Pontypool RFC
1995–≥95	Newbridge RFC
1996–97	West Hartlepool
1997–99	Cardiff RFC
	Treorchy RFC
	Rumney RFC
–2009	Llantwit Major RFC
	Total	0	0	0	0	0

Rugby league
- Position: Fullback
Club
Years	Team	Pld	T	G	FG	P
1991	Halifax	6	1	14	0	32
Representative
Years	Team	Pld	T	G	FG	P
1991	Wales	1	0	0	0	0

Coaching information
Club
Years	Team	Gms	W	D	L	W%
2001	Llantwit Major RFC
	Beddau RFC
	Rumney RFC
2016–2019	Bridgend Ravens
2019–	RGC 1404
	Total	0	0	0	0

Matthew Silva (born 15 March 1970) is a Welsh rugby union coach, who is the current coach of RGC 1404. He is a former rugby union and professional rugby league footballer, who played from the 1980s to the 2000s. In rugby union (RU), he played as a number eight, fly-half, centre, wing and fullback. In rugby league (RL), he played as a fullback.

As a player, he played club level rugby union for St Albans RFC (Cardiff), Llandaff RFC, Newport RFC, Pontypool RFC, Newbridge RFC, West Hartlepool R.F.C., Cardiff RFC, Treorchy RFC, Rumney RFC and Llantwit Major RFC. He played club level rugby league for Halifax, and representative level for Wales.

As a coach, he has coached club level rugby union for Llantwit Major RFC, Beddau RFC, Rumney RFC, Cardiff Blues Under-16, Under-18, Under-20s and Bridgend Ravens. From 2005 to 2013, he was the Welsh Rugby Union/Cardiff Blues Player Development Officer for the Vale of Glamorgan. From 2013 to 2015, he was Director of Rugby at Cowbridge Comprehensive School and was responsible for establishing the Rugby Academy that competes in the Welsh Rugby Union National Colleges League. In 2015, he became the Welsh Rugby Union and Ospreys Coach Development Officer.

== Background ==
Matthew Silva was born in Tremorfa, Cardiff, Wales.

== Playing career ==
=== International honours ===
Silva represented Wales (RU) at Under-19s, Under-21s, and Wales 'B', and won a cap for Wales (RL) while at Halifax in the 68-0 victory over Papua New Guinea at Vetch Field, Swansea on Thursday 17 October 1991.

=== Notable tour matches ===
Silva toured Canada with Newport RFC in 1988, played for Pontypool RFC against the touring All Blacks in 1989, and toured Africa with Pontypool RFC in 1989, playing against Kenya.

=== Rugby union club career ===
Silva began playing rugby aged 7 at St Albans RFC as a number eight, he played and scored a try in Cardiff schools Under-11s 8–4 victory over Bridgend schools Under-11s in the DC Thomas cup final at Cardiff Arms Park. He ended his playing career aged 39 as a player-coach at Llantwit Major RFC as a fly-half. His goal kicking statistics are 2674 points in league and cup games.

=== Rugby league club career ===
Silva was signed to Halifax by Peter Roe in March 1991. He broke his leg in the 20–27 defeat by Salford in the Second Division Premiership Trophy final at Old Trafford on 12 May 1991, and subsequently left Halifax after Roger Millward became coach.

== Coaching career ==
Silva began his player-coaching role aged 31 at Llantwit Major RFC. He later went on to coach Rumney RFC of the WRU Division One East league, and while backs coach of the Cardiff Blues, their Under-16s, Under-16, Under-18, and team Under-20s. He also coached Old Illtydians RFC, a feeder club of the Blues and his former high school team.

In May 2016, Silva was appointed as the new coach of Bridgend Ravens, succeeding Mike Hook. On 11 May 2019, Bridgend survived relegation from the Welsh Premiership, with a 34–31 victory over Pontypridd RFC. On 24 June, Silva was sacked by Bridgend, following a change of management at the club.

On 18 July 2019, Silva was appointed as the new coach of RGC 1404, succeeding Mark Jones. On 1 December, he took a leave of absence for personal reasons.
