= Ralph Rimmer =

British rugby league administrator

Ralph Rimmer OBE
- Born: Ralph William James Rimmer; October 1965 (age 60); Cumbria, England
- Education: Ulverstone Victoria High School
- Alma mater: University of Liverpool
- Occupation: Executive Chairman of Huddersfield Giants
- Known for: Former CEO of the RFL

Ralph William James Rimmer OBE is a rugby league administrator who is currently executive chairman of Huddersfield Giants and who was the chief executive officer of the Rugby Football League from 2018 to 2022. He was appointed the full-time chief executive after a period of being the interim CEO. He held the post of chief operating officer for the RFL before being appointed CEO. He was appointed to the role of COO in 2010. In December 2025, he was announced as a member of the Huddersfield Giants board as Director for change, becoming chairman following Ken Davy's resignation in July 2026.

== Administration ==
=== Sheffield-Huddersfield ===
Rimmers first sports administrative role was in 1997 when he was appointed chief executive of Sheffield Eagles during the early days of the Super League. He enjoyed success with the club winning the Challenge Cup Final in 1998, however as financial pressures developed he then became one of the key players in the 1999 merger with Huddersfield Giants. After the merge Rimmer subsequently became chief executive of the new club and held that position until 2004, when he was succeeded by the incumbent, Richard Thewlis.

During this time until 2002 Rimmer took the part time position of managing the Ireland rugby league team as they appeared at the 2000 World Cup.

=== Stadium management and Huddersfield Town ===
After leaving the Giants in 2004 Rimmer was appointed managing director of the Kirklees Stadium whilst also a member of the board of Huddersfield Town AFC. Rimmer spent six years as managing director of the stadium until he took up a post at the Rugby Football League.

=== Rugby Football League ===
Rimmer was appointed chief operations officer of the RFL in 2010 and was promoted to chief executive officer in 2018 following the departure of his predecessor Nigel Wood. Rimmer announced he would leave the RFL at the end of 2022.

Rimmer was appointed Officer of the Order of the British Empire (OBE) in the 2024 New Year Honours for services to rugby league football.

=== Independent rugby union advisor ===
In June 2023 Rimmer was appointed as an independent advisor by the Department for Culture, Media and Sport to work with the Rugby Football Union and Premiership Rugby and assist in stabilising the professional future of English rugby union.

=== Huddersfield Giants ===
Following a 3 month review of the club and ways to drive it forward, Rimmer was invited to join the Giants board as "director for change" in December 2025. In July 2026, Rimmer was announced as Huddersfield's executive chairman following the resignation of long standing chairman Ken Davy.

== Controversy ==
=== Academy debacle ===
In May 2021 under Rimmers leadership of the RFL, the governing body stripped four Super League clubs, Castleford, Hull KR, Leigh and Salford as well as Championship club Bradford of elite academy status. The announcement was met with outrage and Rimmer was forced to reverse the decision after an interview with Sky Sports and backlash from the rest of the sport.

=== Racism allegations ===
Rimmer faced an allegation of racism following a throw away comment made at an RFL awards evening and an independent enquiry was subsequently set-up to deal with the issue, which concluded that there was no case to answer . He had been discussing Fijis World Cup preparations In September 2022 at the RFL annual awards night at Headingley, Rimmer was discussing Fiji's World Cup preparations ahead of a warm up game with England during a speech and said: "Fiji have already arrived. We don’t think anybody has been arrested yet, do we? No, we’re all right, so we are going pretty well then".
