= 1988–89 Rugby League Premiership =

1988–89 Premiership
- Structure: National knockout championship
- Winners: Widnes
- Runners-up: Hull F.C.

The 1988–89 Rugby League Premiership was the 15th end of season Rugby League Premiership competition.

The winners were Widnes.

== First round ==
Date	Team one	Team two	Score
23 Apr	Hull F.C.	Castleford	32-6
23 Apr	Leeds	Featherstone Rovers	12-15
23 Apr	Widnes	Bradford Northern	30-18
23 Apr	Wigan	St Helens	2-4

== Semi-finals ==
Date	Team one	Team two	Score
07 May	Hull F.C.	Featherstone Rovers	23-0
07 May	Widnes	St Helens	38-14

== Final ==
14 May 1989

Widnes	18-10	Hull F.C.
T-Currier, D Wright, Offiah; G-Davies (3)		T-Welham; G-Pearce (3)

Old Trafford
Attendance: 40,194
Referee: John Holdsworth
Player of the Match: Alan Tait

1	Alan Tait
2	Jonathan Davies
3	Andy Currier
4	Darren Wright
5	Martin Offiah
6	David Hulme
7	Paul Hulme
8	Kurt Sorensen
9	Phil McKenzie
10	Joey Grima
11	Mike O'Neill
12	Emosi Koloto
13	Richard Eyres
Substitutions:
14	Derek Pyke for Andy Currier
15	Tony Myler for Paul Hulme
Coach:
Doug Laughton

1	Paul Fletcher
2	Paul Eastwood
3	Brian Blacker
4	Richard Price
5	Dane O'Hara
6	Gary Pearce
7	Phil Windley
8	Andy Dannatt
9	Lee Jackson
10	Steve Crooks
11	Paul Welham
12	Jon Sharp
13	Gary Divorty
Substitutions:
14	Tim Wilby for Richard Price
15	Rob Nolan for Phil Windley
Coach:
Brian Smith
