= Ken Davy =

British businessman

Kenneth Ernest Davy OBE (born 1941) is a British businessman. He is the owner and former chairman of the rugby league club Huddersfield Giants and former chairman of football club Huddersfield Town. He stood for Parliament as a Conservative Party candidate in 1970 and 1974, and again in 2019.

== Career ==
Davy grew up in Filey on the East Coast of Yorkshire. He left school at 15 with no academic qualifications and worked as a photographer for P&O. At 21 he set up a commercial photography business in Huddersfield before joining Abbey Life in 1971. In 1979 he formed the independent financial advice company DBS, which he sold in June 2001, for £75 million. In 2003, he set up SimplyBiz, providing development, research and marketing services to financial advisers.

In 2011, he gave his views on the changes happening in the financial services industry "Restricted advice will prove much less attractive than many organisations believe. I can see why life insurers would be attracted to it, because it is a way of increasing their profits, but it does nothing for consumers or advisers." However, he later launched a national Restricted (rather than Independent) advice firm - Sandringham Partners in 2012, backed by £2m from SimplyBiz. He was made an OBE in the New Year's honours list in 2024/25.

=== The Shay Stadium and Halifax Sports Proposals ===
In March 2025, Calderdale Council approved Ken Davy's purchase of The Shay Stadium from the local authority, securing its future as a multi-sport venue shared by FC Halifax Town (football) and Halifax Panthers (rugby league).

Davy's ownership includes commitments for facility upgrades, such as a hybrid pitch, to support temporary use by Huddersfield Giants from 2026 pending their new stadium.

In hypothetical scenarios discussed by local supporters, Davy has been linked to concepts for a unified "Halifax Sports Club" merging the Panthers and FC Halifax Town operations at The Shay. Proponents envision this evolving into a new 15,000-seat stadium near Skircoat Green by 2028, with football relocating there post-merger while rugby retains a revamped Shay for community use. These ideas remain speculative and have not advanced to formal proposals.

== Huddersfield Giants ==
In 1996, Davy took over as chairman of Huddersfield Giants rugby league club. In 1999, he merged Huddersfield Giants with Sheffield Eagles, a move which resulted in the formation of the Huddersfield-Sheffield Giants. It was an unpopular move with supporters, and after one season the club reverted to being the Huddersfield Giants.

During Davy's chairmanship Huddersfield Giants went from being a Second Division club to a Super League force, competing in semi finals and finals. The club were promoted to the Super League in 1998, and despite being relegated in 2001, the team came straight back up in 2002 and won the 2002 Northern Ford Premiership remaining unbeaten throughout the league season and playoffs, and winning the Buddies Cup. Only 4 years later, Huddersfield Giants played St. Helens in the 2006 Challenge Cup Final at Twickenham Stadium, London. It was the first time that Huddersfield had reached the final since 1962. That was followed up with another Challenge Cup Final appearance, this time losing to Warrington Wolves at Wembley Stadium in 2009, a third cup final appearance under Davy's stewardship was secured in 2022 when the Giants emphatically beat Hull Kingston Rovers 25-4 at Elland Road to book a place in the final at Tottenham.

In 2013 the Giants won the League Leaders Shield, after a 40–0 victory over Wakefield Trinity Wildcats, It was the first time a Huddersfield team had topped the table in 81 years. They were also Challenge cup semi finalists in 2004 and 2012 losing to St Helens and Warrington again, respectively, as well as making the Super League playoffs semi finals in 2010, 2013 and 2015.

Davy announced in July 2026 that he was stepping down as chairman of Huddersfield with immediate effect to enable incumbent Ralph Rimmer to start the sweeping changes needed at the club, Davy remains Huddersfield's chief financial backer and owner but relinquished 30 years of executive power at the club.

== Huddersfield Town ==
Davy led the successful consortium, out of three interested, that took over Huddersfield Town A.F.C. in 2003, when they were in administration following the collapse of ITV Digital and Town's recent relegation to the Football League's bottom tier. As part of the takeover Huddersfield Town's 40% share in the ground was transferred to a holding company, Huddersfield Sporting Pride Ltd. Huddersfield Sporting Pride Ltd holds a 60% stake in the Huddersfield ground with the combined original stakes of the football and rugby club, the other 40% stake is owned by Kirklees Council.

In September 2006, he was criticised for failing to offer Town a significant transfer budget for the 2006–07 season to enable the club to build on their play-off position of the previous season. The budget, which was unspecified, was (according to former manager Peter Jackson) already used up on signing just two players, goalkeeper Matt Glennon and striker Luke Beckett despite the release of several players. However, Davy stated that Jackson was given the opportunity to strengthen his squad in order to mount a drive for promotion. This was not utilised and Jackson's "inability to attract key players" was one of the reasons given by Davy for the manager's dismissal.

After Huddersfield's 2–3 loss to Yeovil Town on 16 September 2006, he addressed a peaceful demonstration of around 100 Town fans who had called for him to up the transfer budget or go, because of Town's poor start to the season in Football League One, in which they only picked up nine points from the first nine games.

On 3 June 2009, he handed over the chairmanship to Dean Hoyle and, after a brief period of retaining a minority shareholding, relinquished all ownership in Huddersfield Town.

He has been awarded an Honorary Doctorate in Business Administration from the University of Huddersfield and an Honorary Fellowship of the Chartered Insurance Institute.

== See also ==
- List of Super League rugby league club owners
- List of owners of English football clubs
