= Gary Pearce (rugby) =

Wales dual-code rugby international footballer

Personal information
- Full name: Peter Gareth Pearce
- Born: 11 November 1960 (age 65) Laugharne, Carmarthenshire, Wales

Playing information
- Weight: 15 st 0 lb (95 kg)

Rugby union
- Position: Fly-half
Club
Years	Team	Pld	T	G	FG	P
	Laugharne RFC
	Bridgend RFC
	Llanelli RFC
	Total	0	0	0	0	0
Representative
Years	Team	Pld	T	G	FG	P
1981–82	Wales	3	0	0	2	6

Rugby league
- Position: Stand-off, Hooker
Club
Years	Team	Pld	T	G	FG	P
1986–91	Hull FC	98	33	243	31	649
1990(loan)	→Sheffield Eagles	4	0	11	3	25
1991	Scarborough Pirates	17	3	44	4	104
1992–93	Ryedale-York	27	4	91	5	203
	Total	146	40	389	43	981
Representative
Years	Team	Pld	T	G	FG	P
1991–92	Wales	4	0	3	1	7

Peter Gareth Pearce (born 11 November 1960) is a Welsh director of rugby at Hull RUFC (2000–2005), and dual-code international rugby union and professional rugby league footballer who played in the 1980s and 1990s. He played representative level rugby union (RU) for Wales, and at club level for Laugharne RFC, Bridgend RFC and Llanelli RFC, as a fly-half. i.e. number 10, and representative level rugby league (RL) for Wales, and at club level for Hull FC, Scarborough Pirates and Ryedale-York, as a stand-off, or hooker.

== Playing career ==
=== Rugby union ===
Born in Laugharne, Wales, Pearce started his rugby career as a rugby union player. He won caps for Wales in 1981 against Ireland, France, and in 1982 against Ireland.

=== Rugby league ===
Pearce switched codes in September 1986, joining rugby league side Hull. He was a losing finalist with Hull in the 1988–89 Premiership.

He won caps for Wales while at Scarborough Pirates in 1991 against Papua New Guinea, in 1992 against France, and while at Ryedale-York in 1992 against France.
