= 1988–89 Rugby Football League season =

- League: Stones Bitter Championship
- Teams: First Division: 14; Second Division: 20

First Division
- Champions: Widnes (3rd title)
- Premiership winners: Widnes
- Man of Steel Award: (England) Ellery Hanley
- Top try-scorer: (England) Martin Offiah (60)

Promotion and relegation
- Promoted from Second Division: Leigh; Barrow; Sheffield Eagles
- Relegated to Second Division: Oldham; Halifax; Hull Kingston Rovers

Second Division
- Champions: Leigh
- Runners-up: Barrow
- Top point-scorer: (England) Mark Aston (307)
- Top try-scorer: (England) Derek Bate (34)

The 1988–89 Rugby Football League season was the 94th season of professional rugby league football in Britain. Fourteen teams competed from August, 1988 until May, 1989 for the Stones Bitter Championship, Premiership Trophy and Silk Cut Challenge Cup.

== Season summary ==
Springfield Borough (previously Blackpool Borough) relocated were renamed Chorley Borough.

Huddersfield Barracudas reverted to their original name Huddersfield.

Wigan beat Salford 22–17 to win the Lancashire County Cup, and Leeds beat Castleford 33–12 to win the Yorkshire County Cup.

== First Division ==
Pos	Team	Pld	W	D	L	PF	PA	PP	Pts	Qualification or relegation
1	Widnes (C)	26	20	1	5	726	345	210.4	41	Qualification for Premiership first round
2	Wigan	26	19	0	7	543	434	125.1	38	Qualification for Premiership first round
3	Leeds	26	18	0	8	530	380	139.5	36	Qualification for Premiership first round
4	Hull	26	17	0	9	427	355	120.3	34	Qualification for Premiership first round
5	Castleford	26	15	2	9	601	480	125.2	32	Qualification for Premiership first round
6	Featherstone Rovers	26	13	1	12	482	545	88.4	27	Qualification for Premiership first round
7	St Helens	26	12	1	13	513	529	97.0	25	Qualification for Premiership first round
8	Bradford Northern	26	11	1	14	545	518	105.2	23	Qualification for Premiership first round
9	Wakefield Trinity	26	11	1	14	413	540	76.5	23	
10	Salford	26	11	0	15	469	526	89.2	22	
11	Warrington	26	10	0	16	456	455	100.2	20	
12	Oldham (R)	26	8	1	17	462	632	73.1	17	Relegated to Second Division
13	Hull Kingston Rovers (R)	26	6	1	19	408	636	64.2	13	Relegated to Second Division
14	Halifax (R)	26	6	1	19	335	535	62.6	13	Relegated to Second Division

Rules for classification: 1) Points; 2) Points scored percentage (points scored divided by points conceded)
(C) Champions; (R) Relegated

== Second Division ==
Pos	Team	Pld	W	D	L	PF	PA	PP	Pts	Promotion or qualification
1	Leigh (C, P)	28	26	0	2	925	338	273.7	52	Promoted to First Division Qualified for Divisional Premiership first round
2	Barrow (P)	28	21	1	6	726	326	222.7	43	Promoted to First Division Qualified for Divisional Premiership first round
3	Sheffield Eagles (P)	28	19	1	8	669	362	184.8	39	Promoted to First Division Qualified for Divisional Premiership first round
4	York	28	17	1	10	585	383	152.7	35	Qualification for Divisional Premiership first round
5	Doncaster	28	17	0	11	599	464	129.1	34	Qualification for Divisional Premiership first round
6	Swinton	28	16	2	10	621	482	128.8	34	Qualification for Divisional Premiership first round
7	Whitehaven	28	15	2	11	522	378	138.1	32	Qualification for Divisional Premiership first round
8	Keighley	28	16	0	12	551	525	105.0	32	Qualification for Divisional Premiership first round
9	Rochdale Hornets	28	15	0	13	655	677	96.8	30	
10	Bramley	28	14	1	13	600	514	116.7	29	
11	Carlisle	28	14	1	13	512	441	116.1	29	
12	Batley	28	13	3	12	461	416	110.8	29	
13	Dewsbury	28	13	0	15	518	626	82.7	26	
14	Hunslet	28	12	1	15	473	540	87.6	25	
15	Fulham	28	10	0	18	464	650	71.4	20	
16	Chorley Borough	28	9	1	18	408	533	76.5	19	
17	Workington Town	28	9	1	18	365	549	66.5	19	
18	Huddersfield	28	9	1	18	400	615	65.0	19	
19	Mansfield Marksman	28	4	1	23	308	769	40.1	9	
20	Runcorn Highfield	28	2	1	25	224	998	22.4	5	

Rules for classification: 1) Points; 2) Points scored percentage (points scored divided by points conceded)
(C) Champions; (P) Promoted

== Premiership ==
=== First Division Premiership ===
14 May 1989

Widnes (1)	18-10	Hull F.C. (4)
T-Currier, D Wright, Offiah; G-Davies (3)		T-Welham; G-Pearce (3)

Old Trafford
Attendance: 40,194
Referee: John Holdsworth
Player of the Match: Alan Tait

=== Divisional Premiership ===
14 May 1989

Sheffield Eagles (3)	43 – 18	Swinton (6)
Tries: Powell (3), Broadbent, Aston, Cook, McDermott; Goals: Aston (7); Drop goals: Aston		Tries: Frodsham, Melling, Ranson; Goals: Myler (3)

Old Trafford, Manchester
Referee: Robin Whitfield (Widnes)
Player of the Match: Mark Aston

== Sources ==
- Fletcher, Raymond; Howes, David, eds. (1989). Rothmans Rugby League Yearbook 1989-90. London: Queen Anne Press. ISBN 978-0-356-17850-9.
- 1988-89 Rugby Football League season at wigan.rlfans.com
- Great Britain Competitions 1988-1989 at hunterlink.net.au
