= Greg Austin (rugby) =

Australian rugby footballer

Personal information
- Full name: Gregory Austin
- Born: 14 June 1963 (age 63) Sydney, New South Wales, Australia

Playing information
- Position: Centre
Club
Years	Team	Pld	T	G	FG	P
1985–86	Rochdale Hornets	20+2	11	0	0	44
1986–88	Salford	47+1	25	24	1	149
1987–89	Manly Sea Eagles	15	9	0	0	36
1989–90	Hull Kingston Rovers	38	45	0	0	180
1990–93	Halifax	88+1	100	0	0	400
1993–94	Keighley Cougars	15	19	0	0	76
1994	Salford	3	0	0	0	0
1994–96	Huddersfield Giants	66	74	25	1	347
	Total	296	283	49	2	1232
- Notable relative: Mitch Austin (son)

Rugby union career
- Position(s): Full-back, Centre
Senior career
Years	Team	Apps	(Points)
1996-97	Leicester Tigers	6	(10)
1997-99	Rotherham Titans	40	(110)
–	L'Aquila		
–	Buccaneers RFC		

Greg Austin (born 14 June 1963) is an Australian former rugby league and rugby union footballer who played in the 1980s and 1990s. A prolific try scorer, Austin spent the majority of his playing career in England.

== Career ==
Born in Sydney, Austin was one of several overseas' players who joined Rochdale Hornets in the mid 1980s. He then moved to Salford, scoring 25 tries in 48 games for the club between 1986 and 1988. Whilst at Salford, he returned to Australia during the summer months to play for Manly-Warringah. In 1989, Austin signed for Hull Kingston Rovers.

Austin scored seven tries in four games at the start of the 1990–91 season, but in September 1990, following the signing of James Goulding, Austin was released by Hull KR so that the club could include Goulding in their overseas quota. He was signed by Halifax later that month. He went on to score a further 40 tries in 30 appearances with Halifax during that season, giving him a total of 47 tries during the season, the second highest total behind Martin Offiah. He repeated the feat in the following season, finishing as the second-highest try scorer with a total of 33.

In April 1993, Austin scored his 100th try for Halifax against Widnes in his last appearance for the club. He left the club at the end of the season, dropping down a division to join Keighley. He re-joined Salford in 1994 until the end of the season, before being signed by Huddersfield later that year.

In November 1994, Austin played in Huddersfield's club and league record 142–4 win in a first-round Regal Trophy against Blackpool Gladiators, with Austin scoring nine tries – one short of Lionel Cooper's club record of ten tries scored in a match. He had scored 52 tries by the end of the 1994–95 season, a world record for number of tries scored by a centre in a single season. In 1996, Austin switched codes and joined rugby union side Leicester Tigers.

== Personal life ==
Austin is the father of the footballer; Mitch Austin.
