= 1990–91 Rugby Football League season =

- League: Championship
- Teams: First Division: 14; Second Division: 21

First Division
- Champions: Wigan (12th title)
- Premiership winners: Hull
- Man of Steel Award: (England) Garry Schofield

Promotion and relegation
- Relegated to Second Division: Oldham; Sheffield Eagles; Rochdale Hornets

Second Division
- Champions: Salford

Promotion and relegation
- Promoted from Second Division: Salford; Halifax; Swinton
- Relegated to New Third Division: Doncaster; Hunslet; Huddersfield; Whitehaven; Keighley; Dewsbury; Trafford Borough; Batley; Barrow; Chorley Borough; Bramley; Runcorn Highfield; Nottingham City

The 1990–91 Rugby Football League season was the 96th ever season of professional rugby league football in Britain. Fourteen teams competed from August, 1990 until May, 1991 for the Stones Bitter Championship, Premiership Trophy and Silk Cut Challenge Cup.

== Season summary ==
=== Overview ===
- First Division: Wigan
- Second Division: Salford
- Premiership: Hull F.C.
- Divisional Premiership: Salford
- Challenge Cup: Wigan
- League Cup: Warrington

=== Summary ===
Bradford Northern player Simon Tuffs tested positive for amphetamines, and was the first time a failed drugs test involving a rugby league player had been made public since random testing had been introduced by the RFL in 1987. He received a two-year suspension, but the ban was lifted following an appeal.

Due to a fixture backlog, Wigan, who were challenging for the league championship title, were forced to play their final eight league games within 19 days, a task described as "Mission Impossible" by coach John Monie. The club managed to win seven out of eight games to retain the title.

In April 1991, clubs approved a new three division format to be used from the start of the 1991–92 season. The Championship would remain a 14 team league, while the Second Division would consist of eight teams and the new Third Division would have 14 teams.

== First Division ==
Wigan retained their title this season, relegated were Oldham, Sheffield Eagles and Rochdale Hornets.

Pos	Team	Pld	W	D	L	PF	PA	PD	Pts	Qualification or relegation
1	Wigan (C)	26	20	2	4	652	313	+339	42	Qualification for Premiership first round
2	Widnes	26	20	0	6	635	340	+295	40	Qualification for Premiership first round
3	Hull F.C.	26	17	0	9	513	367	+146	34	Qualification for Premiership first round
4	Castleford	26	17	0	9	578	442	+136	34	Qualification for Premiership first round
5	Leeds	26	14	2	10	602	448	+154	30	Qualification for Premiership first round
6	St Helens	26	14	1	11	628	533	+95	29	Qualification for Premiership first round
7	Bradford Northern	26	13	1	12	434	492	−58	27	Qualification for Premiership first round
8	Featherstone Rovers	26	12	1	13	533	592	−59	25	Qualification for Premiership first round
9	Warrington	26	10	2	14	404	436	−32	22	
10	Wakefield Trinity	26	10	2	14	356	409	−53	22	
11	Hull Kingston Rovers	26	9	3	14	452	615	−163	21	
12	Oldham (R)	26	10	0	16	481	562	−81	20	Relegated to Second Division
13	Sheffield Eagles (R)	26	7	2	17	459	583	−124	16	Relegated to Second Division
14	Rochdale Hornets (R)	26	1	0	25	317	912	−595	2	Relegated to Second Division

Rules for classification: 1) Points; 2) Points difference; 3) Number of points scored;
(C) Champions; (R) Relegated

== Second Division ==
Pos	Team	Pld	W	D	L	PF	PA	PD	Pts	Promotion, qualification or relegation
1	Salford (C, P)	28	26	1	1	856	219	+637	53	Promoted to First Division; Qualified for Divisional Premiership first round
2	Halifax (P)	28	24	0	4	941	311	+630	48	Promoted to First Division; Qualified for Divisional Premiership first round
3	Swinton (P)	28	21	2	5	523	370	+153	44	Promoted to First Division; Qualified for Divisional Premiership first round
4	Ryedale-York	28	20	2	6	559	294	+265	42	Qualified for Divisional Premiership first round
5	Leigh	28	18	1	9	698	372	+326	37	Qualified for Divisional Premiership first round
6	Workington Town	28	18	1	9	497	323	+174	37	Qualified for Divisional Premiership first round
7	Fulham	28	17	2	9	450	338	+112	36	Qualified for Divisional Premiership first round
8	Carlisle	28	16	2	10	613	425	+188	34	Qualified for Divisional Premiership first round
9	Doncaster (R)	28	16	0	12	507	434	+73	32	Relegated to Third Division
10	Hunslet (R)	28	13	2	13	519	438	+81	28	Relegated to Third Division
11	Huddersfield (R)	28	13	1	14	493	477	+16	27	Relegated to Third Division
12	Whitehaven (R)	28	13	0	15	412	592	−180	26	Relegated to Third Division
13	Keighley (R)	28	12	0	16	456	588	−132	24	Relegated to Third Division
14	Dewsbury (R)	28	10	1	17	410	455	−45	21	Relegated to Third Division
15	Trafford Borough (R)	28	10	0	18	508	618	−110	20	Relegated to Third Division
16	Batley (R)	28	10	0	18	337	466	−129	20	Relegated to Third Division
17	Barrow (R)	28	8	2	18	415	705	−290	18	Relegated to Third Division
18	Chorley Borough (R)	28	7	1	20	388	721	−333	15	Relegated to Third Division
19	Bramley (R)	28	7	1	20	379	726	−347	15	Relegated to Third Division
20	Runcorn Highfield	28	3	1	24	351	779	−428	7	Relegated to Third Division
21	Nottingham City (R)	28	2	0	26	284	945	−661	4	Relegated to Third Division

Rules for classification: 1) Points; 2) Points difference; 3) Number of points scored;
(C) Champions; (P) Promoted; (R) Relegated

== Premiership ==
=== First Division Premiership ===
12 May 1991

Hull F.C.	14-4	Widnes
T-Gay, Nolan G, Walker; G-Eastwood		T-Offiah

Old Trafford
Attendance: 42,043
Referee: John Holdsworth
Player of the Match: Greg Mackey

=== Divisional Premiership ===
12 May 1991

Salford	27 – 20	Halifax
Tries: Kerry (2), Evans, Gilfillan; Goals: Kerry (4); Drop goals: Kerry, Cassidy, Lee		Tries: Southernwood, Hill, Wilson, Wood; Goals: Platt (2)

Old Trafford, Manchester
Referee: Brian Galtress (Bradford)
Player of the Match: Steve Kerry

== Sources ==
- 1990–91 Rugby Football League season at wigan.rlfans.com
- Great Britain Competitions 1990-1991 at hunterlink.net.au
