= Steve Snape =

English rugby league footballer

Personal information
- Full name: Steven Edward Snape
- Born: 17 September 1963 (age 61); Manchester, England

Playing information
- Height: 5 ft 10 in (1.78 m)
- Position: Left centre
Club
Years	Team	Pld	T	G	FG	P
1984–92	Swinton Lions	216	49	1	2	200

Steve Snape (born 17 September 1963) is an English former professional rugby league footballer who played in the 1980s and 1990s. He played at club level for Swinton, as a left-centre or stand-off, and occasionally as a right-centre.

== Background ==
Steve Snape was born in Manchester, Lancashire, England.

== Playing career ==
Steve Snape played in Swinton's victory in the Championship Second Division during the 1984–85 season and earned promotion from the Championship Second Division to the Championship First Division, finishing runner-up during the 1986–87 season and earned promotion from the Championship Second Division to the Championship First Division, and finishing third during the 1990–91 Rugby Football League season and earned promotion from the Championship Second Division to the Championship First Division. His career with Swinton was brought to a somewhat premature end during the 1992–93 season following disagreements with the club's board, regarding the sale of the Station Road stadium, and the club's subsequent move to Gigg Lane in Bury, Greater Manchester.
