= Jon Sharp =

English RL coach and former rugby league footballer

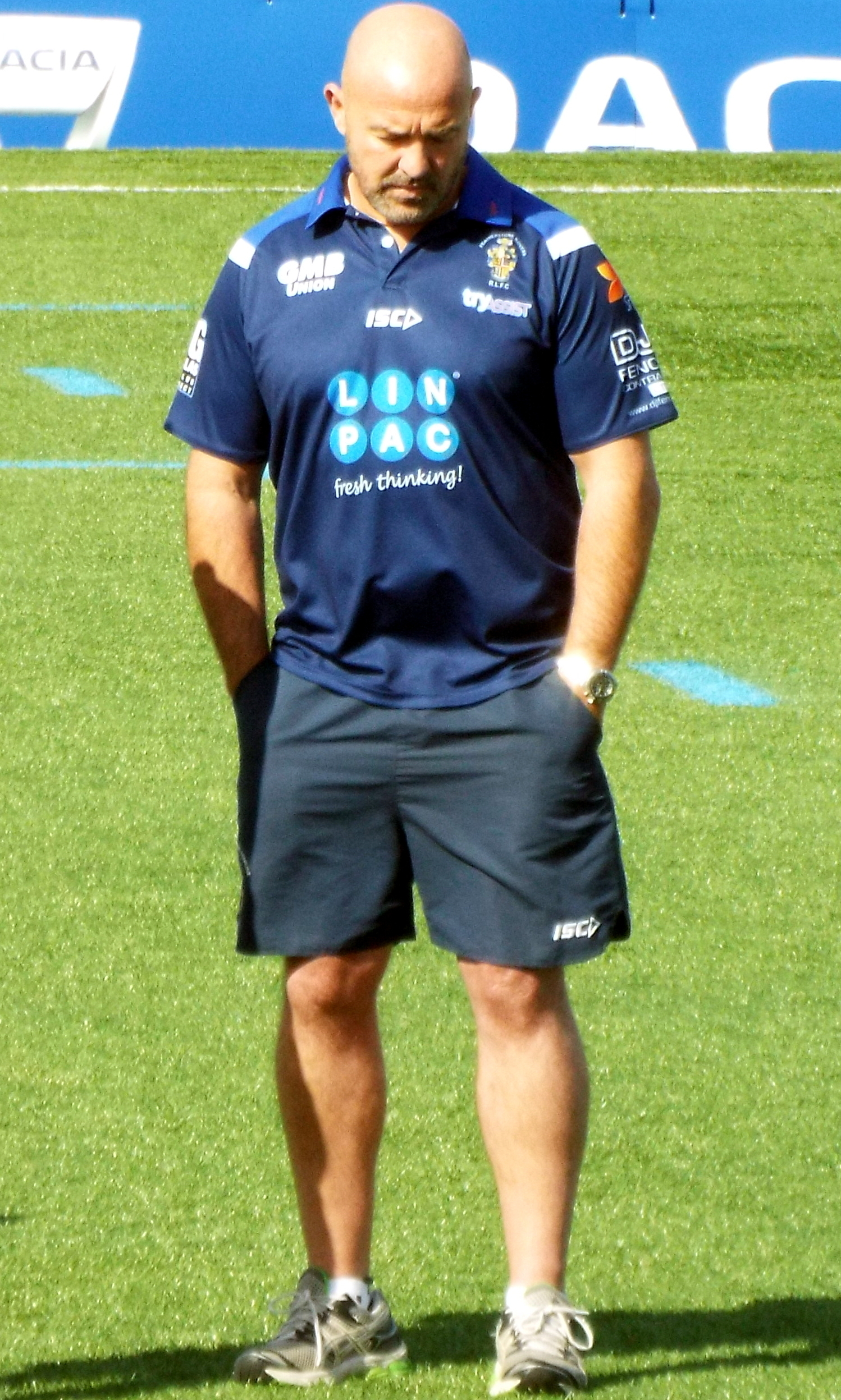
- Sharp in 2016

Personal information
- Full name: Jonathan Sharp
- Born: 8 March 1967 (age 59) Pontefract, West Riding of Yorkshire, England

Playing information
- Position: Loose forward
Club
Years	Team	Pld	T	G	FG	P
1985–95	Hull FC	242	31	0	1	195
1995	Featherstone Rovers	10	0	0	0	0
	Total	252	31	0	1	195

Coaching information
Club
Years	Team	Gms	W	D	L	W%
2000–01	Batley Bulldogs	0	0	0	0
2005–08	Huddersfield Giants	84	35	2	47	42
2015–17	Featherstone Rovers	70	42	0	28	60
	Total	154	77	2	75	50

Jon Sharp (born 8 March 1967) was the head coach of Featherstone Rovers from 2015 to 2017. Between 2004 and 2008 he was head coach of the Huddersfield Giants, having been appointed in 2003 when Tony Smith left the club for the Leeds Rhinos. He was also part of the Great Britain coaching set-up under head coach Brian Noble. As a player, he played for Hull FC, and he has also worked as a member of the backroom staff there.

== Playing career ==
=== Hull ===
Jon Sharp played loose forward in Hull FC's 24-31 defeat by Castleford in the 1986 Yorkshire Cup Final during the 1986–87 season at Headingley, Leeds on Saturday 11 October 1986.

Jon Sharp's Testimonial match at Hull FC took place in 1994.

== Coaching career ==
=== 2004-2005 ===
In 2004, Sharp's début season as coach of Huddersfield the club finished 7th in Super League and made an appearance in the semi-finals of the Challenge Cup for the first time since 1971. The team lost to St. Helens. In 2005 the club signed Michael De Vere from Brisbane Broncoes, the highest profile Australian signing since the 1950s. The team finished in 8th place.

=== 2006 ===
In 2006, Sharp led Huddersfield to their first Challenge Cup final in over 40 years, including a 30-12 win over Leeds in the semi-finals held at Odsal. Huddersfield lost in the final 42-12 against favourites St Helens.

=== 2007 ===
After a nightmare start to 2007's Super League XII in which Huddersfield lost all of their opening 7 games, some might have expected Sharp's job to be under threat. However, Huddersfield's faith was repaid when Sharp led the team from 5 points adrift at the bottom to being 4th in Super League after, winning a club record 7 along the way including a first win over Bradford Bulls in 35 years. Sharp won consecutive Coach of the Month awards in April and May as a result. The club made their first appearance in the Play Off competition losing to Hull at the KC Stadium, 22-16.

=== 2008 ===
The opening 2 matches in 2008 were lost, to Leeds, and to Bradford Bulls. However the 3rd match saw Sharp's team beat Castleford 64-12. After a 48-0 loss to Catalans Dragons, and a run of disappointing results, Sharp's contract was terminated by Huddersfield and for the 2009 season, Nathan Brown, former coach at St. George Illawarra Dragons, took over the helm. He then moved to Featherstone Rovers in a voluntary advisory role to caretaker coach Danny Evans.

=== 2009 ===
In 2009, Sharp joined his former club Hull F.C. as 'football operations manager', working alongside head coach Richard Agar. However, the partnership didn't work out as Hull slipped to a disappointing 12th-place finish, and Sharp left the club at the end of the year.

=== 2010 ===
In October 2009, Sharp was appointed as first team coach for Crusaders Rugby League, where he will link up with former Great Britain colleague Brian Noble (Head coach) and assistant coach Iestyn Harris.

=== 2011 ===
In February 2011, it was confirmed that Sharp had joined the Rugby Football League on a consultancy basis as a technical adviser. As a Technical Adviser he will offer a coach's perspective of playing trends to match officials, as well as serving on the Rugby Football League disciplinary panel.
