= Simon Irving =

English rugby league footballer

- Full name: Simon John Irving
- Born: 22 March 1967 (age 59) Dewsbury, England

Rugby union career
- Position: Centre
Senior career
Years	Team	Apps	(Points)
–	Headingley RU		
–	Huddersfield		
- Rugby league career

Playing information
- Position: Centre
Club
Years	Team	Pld	T	G	FG	P
1990–94	Leeds	84	23	235	0	562
1994–98	Keighley Cougars	94	48	333	0	858
2000	York	9	1	15	0	34
2001–03	Doncaster	55	25	136	1	365
	Total	242	97	719	1	1819

Simon John Irving (born 22 March 1967) is a former professional rugby league and rugby union footballer who played in the 1990s and 2000s. He played at club level for Leeds, Keighley Cougars and Doncaster, as a centre. He usually played at centre and was a regular goal kicker.

== Playing career ==
Born in Dewsbury, Irving started his career in rugby union, and played for the England B team at international level. In 1990, he switched to rugby league, joining Leeds from Headingley RU.

He played for Leeds in the 1991–92 Regal Trophy final against Widnes at Central Park, but the team were defeated 0–24. He left the club in 1994 to join Keighley Cougars.

He returned to rugby union in 1998 to become player-coach at Huddersfield, but came back to rugby league in 2000 with York Wasps.
