= 1991–92 Rugby Football League season =

Rugby football session

- League: Championship
- Duration: 26 Rounds
- Teams: First Division: 14; Second Division: 8 Third Division: 14
- Broadcast partners: Sky Sports

First Division
- Champions: Wigan (13th title)
- Premiership winners: Wigan
- Man of Steel Award: (New Zealand) Dean Bell

Promotion and relegation
- Relegated to Second Division: Featherstone Rovers; Swinton

Second Division
- Champions: Sheffield Eagles

Promotion and relegation
- Promoted from Second Division: Sheffield Eagles; Leigh
- Relegated to Third Division: Ryedale-York; Workington Town

Third Division
- Champions: Huddersfield

Promotion and Relegation
- Promoted to Second Division: Huddersfield; Bramley

The 1991–92 Rugby Football League season was the 97th season of professional rugby league football in Britain. Fourteen teams competed from August, 1991 until May, 1992 for the Stones Bitter Championship, Premiership Trophy and Silk Cut Challenge Cup.

At the end of the season, players from several clubs were selected to go on the 1992 Great Britain Lions tour of Australia and New Zealand.

== Season summary ==
- First Division: Wigan
- Second Division: Sheffield Eagles
- Third Division: Huddersfield
- Premiership Wigan
- Divisional Premiership Sheffield Eagles
- Challenge Cup: Wigan
- League Cup: Widnes

== League Tables ==
For the third consecutive season Wigan finished top of the pile, relegated were Swinton and Featherstone Rovers. To date this is Swinton's last appearance in the top flight and more trouble would follow after this relegation their ground Station Road was sold following mis-management. The club are still without a permanent home within the town's boundaries.

=== First Division ===
Pos	Team	Pld	W	D	L	PF	PA	PD	Pts	Qualification or relegation
1	Wigan (C)	26	22	0	4	645	307	+338	44	Qualification for Premiership first round
2	St Helens	26	17	2	7	550	388	+162	36	Qualification for Premiership first round
3	Castleford	26	15	2	9	558	365	+193	32	Qualification for Premiership first round
4	Warrington	26	15	0	11	507	431	+76	30	Qualification for Premiership first round
5	Leeds	26	14	1	11	515	406	+109	29	Qualification for Premiership first round
6	Wakefield Trinity	26	13	1	12	400	435	−35	27	Qualification for Premiership first round
7	Halifax	26	12	0	14	618	566	+52	24	Qualification for Premiership first round
8	Widnes	26	12	0	14	511	477	+34	24	Qualification for Premiership first round
9	Hull Kingston Rovers	26	12	0	14	379	466	−87	24	
10	Salford	26	11	0	15	480	507	−27	22	
11	Bradford Northern	26	11	0	15	476	513	−37	22	
12	Hull	26	11	0	15	468	526	−58	22	
13	Featherstone Rovers (R)	26	11	0	15	449	570	−121	22	Relegated to Second Division
14	Swinton (R)	26	3	0	23	254	853	−599	6	Relegated to Second Division

Rules for classification: 1) Points; 2) Points difference; 3) Number of points scored;
(C) Champions; (R) Relegated

=== Second Division ===
Pos	Team	Pld	W	D	L	PF	PA	PD	Pts	Promotion, qualification or relegation
1	Sheffield Eagles (C, P)	28	21	1	6	816	396	+420	43	Promoted to First Division; Qualified for Divisional Premiership second round
2	Leigh (P)	28	21	0	7	617	401	+216	42	Promoted to First Division; Qualified for Divisional Premiership second round
3	Oldham	28	18	2	8	558	421	+137	38	Qualified for Divisional Premiership second round
4	London Crusaders	28	14	0	14	428	483	−55	28	Qualified for Divisional Premiership second round
5	Rochdale Hornets	28	12	2	14	619	489	+130	26	
6	Carlisle	28	12	1	15	490	466	+24	25	
7	Ryedale-York (R)	28	5	2	21	338	749	−411	12	Relegated to Third Division
8	Workington Town (R)	28	4	2	22	310	771	−461	10	Relegated to Third Division

Rules for classification: 1) Points; 2) Points difference; 3) Number of points scored;
(C) Champions; (P) Promoted; (R) Relegated

=== Third Division ===
Pos	Team	Pld	W	D	L	PF	PA	PD	Pts	Promotion, qualification or relegation
1	Huddersfield (C, P)	26	23	0	3	869	257	+612	46	Promoted to Second Division; Qualified for Divisional Premiership first round
2	Bramley (P)	26	21	0	5	675	258	+417	42	Promoted to Second Division; Qualified for Divisional Premiership first round
3	Dewsbury	26	19	1	6	794	279	+515	39	Qualified for Divisional Premiership first round
4	Batley	26	18	2	6	641	279	+362	38	Qualified for Divisional Premiership first round
5	Barrow	26	17	1	8	663	355	+308	35	Qualified for Divisional Premiership first round
6	Doncaster	26	15	2	9	567	362	+205	32	Qualified for Divisional Premiership first round
7	Keighley Cougars	26	15	2	9	587	420	+167	32	Qualified for Divisional Premiership first round
8	Hunslet	26	16	0	10	654	553	+101	32	Qualified for Divisional Premiership first round
9	Scarborough Pirates	26	10	0	16	483	499	−16	20	
10	Whitehaven	26	9	0	17	510	595	−85	18	
11	Highfield	26	9	0	17	406	646	−240	18	
12	Chorley Borough	26	4	0	22	290	842	−552	8	
13	Trafford Borough	26	2	0	24	306	941	−635	4	
14	Nottingham City	26	0	0	26	164	1323	−1159	0	

Rules for classification: 1) Points; 2) Points difference; 3) Number of points scored;
(C) Champions; (P) Promoted

== Sources ==
- 1991–92 Rugby Football League season at rlhalloffame.org.uk
- 1991–92 Rugby Football League season at wigan.rlfans.com
- Great Britain Competitions 1991-1992 at hunterlink.net.au
