= Huddersfield Giants =

English professional rugby league football club

Club information
- Full name: Huddersfield Giants Rugby League Football Club
- Nickname(s): The Giants; Fartown; The Claret and Golds; Cowbell Army
- Colours: Claret and Gold
- Founded: 1864; 162 years ago
- Website: giantsrl.com

Current details
- Ground: Autex Acoustics Arena (5,100)
- Chairman: Ralph Rimmer
- Coach: Jim Lenihan
- Captain: tbc
- Competition: Super League
- 2026 season: 12th
- Current season

Uniforms
Home colours

Records
- Championships: 7 (1912, 1913, 1915, 1929, 1930, 1949, 1962)
- Challenge Cups: 6 (1913, 1915, 1920, 1933, 1945, 1953)
- Other top-tier honours: 24

The Huddersfield Giants are an English professional rugby league club from Huddersfield, West Yorkshire, England. Huddersfield play their home games at the Autex Acoustics Arena in Dewsbury and currently compete in the Super League, the top tier of British rugby league.

Huddersfield Giants have won the League Championship seven times and Challenge Cup six times.

The club's home colours are claret and thin gold hooped shirt, claret shorts and claret and gold hooped socks. They have or have had rivalries with Leeds Rhinos, Bradford Bulls, Halifax, Oldham, Keighley Cougars, Wakefield Trinity, Batley Bulldogs and Dewsbury Rams.

== History ==
=== 1848–1894: Foundation and early years ===
The earliest record of a football match being played in the Huddersfield area is in 1848, when a team of men from Hepworth took on a team of men from Holmfirth near Whinney Bank in Holmfirth. Hepworth won a closely fought game which "exhibited the usual amount of confusions, bloody noses, etc" and took the prize of £5 which had been jointly donated by each side.

There appears to have been no formal structure to sport in the Huddersfield area until the opening of the Apollo Gymnasium on 3 August 1850. At this time the gymnasium was the only venue in the town where young men could take part in physical activities, it offered the opportunity to participate in fencing, swimming, bowling, cricket and many other sports.

In 1864 the Apollo Gymnasium was turned into the Gymnasium Theatre. The athletes of the gymnasium responded by forming a more organised athletics association. In an advertisement headed "Huddersfield Athletic Club" they invited "gentlemen desirous of becoming members" to a public meeting at 8 o'clock on the evening of 16 November 1864 at the Queen Hotel. The meeting went ahead, a hundred names were registered and a committee was formed. Within a month a new gymnasium was in service in a basement on Back John William Street. The club's 1864 foundation (a few months before that of Hull F.C.) means that it is the oldest Rugby League club, both in terms of foundation date and continuous history; it celebrated its 150th anniversary in 2014.

On 27 January 1866, twenty members of the Huddersfield Athletic Club agreed to play a football match against twenty of the Huddersfield Rifle Corps at Rifle Field in Trinity Street. Although the result was a scoreless draw, a large crowd was attracted. In light of this, the Huddersfield Athletic Club agreed to start a football section which was to start at the beginning of December 1866. Initially the Huddersfield Athletic Club made no contribution to the support of the football club and each paying member was forced to pay a subscription of 2s/6d (half a crown/12 1/2p). As the football club grew, it became a useful recruiting tool for the Huddersfield Athletic Club. In 1869 six matches were played and by 1870 three of the club's players had been selected to represent Yorkshire. By 1872 there were so many players that a second team was formed.

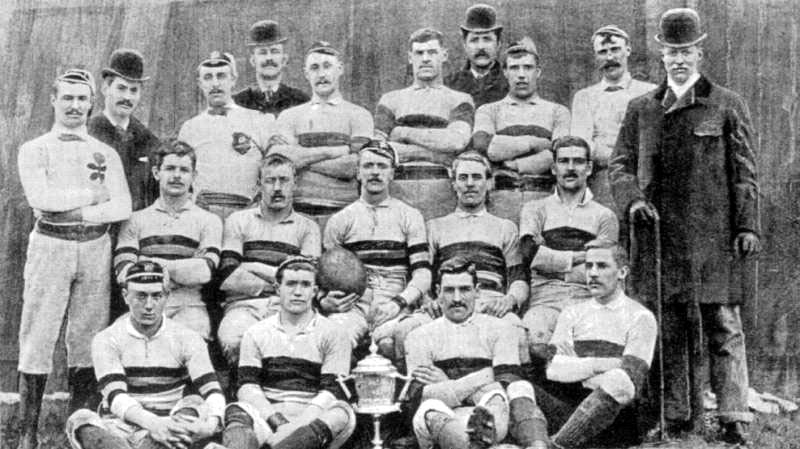
Huddersfield posing with the Yorkshire Cup in 1890

The growth in popularity of the club and the need for better facilities led to the Huddersfield Athletic Club approaching St John's Cricket Club with a proposal to merge the two clubs. St John's Cricket Club had been formed in 1866 at Hillhouse and had moved to Fartown ground. By 1875, when amalgamation talks began, over £800 had been spent on developing the new ground. At a meeting on 27 November 1875, at the Thornhill Arms Inn the two clubs agreed to merge to form the Huddersfield Cricket and Athletics Club. The motion was passed by 55 votes to 37.

Initially the football section stayed at Rifle Field, but alterations made in the summer of 1878 meant that rugby could begin at the start of the 1878–79 season with the visit of Manchester Rangers on 2 November. The new ground would become the club's home for 114 years and would provide the club's famous "Fartown" nickname.

After the 1890–91 season, Huddersfield along with other Yorkshire Senior clubs Batley, Bradford, Brighouse, Dewsbury, Halifax, Huddersfield, Hull, Hunslet, Leeds, Liversedge, Manningham and Wakefield decided that they wanted their own county league starting in 1891 along the lines of a similar competition that had been played in Lancashire. The clubs wanted full control of the league but the Yorkshire Rugby Football Union would not sanction the competition as it meant giving up control of rugby football to the senior clubs.

=== 1895-1920s: Northern Union and golden years ===
In 1895 the club were founder members of the Northern Rugby Football Union, (later the Rugby Football League).

The club has seen many ups and downs in its long history, but for the first 60 years of rugby league it was one of the powerhouses of the game, with only Wigan as rivals in terms of trophies won.

Harold Wagstaff was only fifteen years and one hundred and seventy-five days old when he played his first match for Huddersfield, against Bramley in November 1906. At the time, he was the youngest first-team player the game had seen, he had signed on for a £5 signing-on fee.

Huddersfield beat the touring 1908–09 Kangaroos 5–3. They were impressed enough with stand-off Albert Rosenfeld to sign him up that evening along with Australian Dual Code International Pat Walsh one of the best forwards of the Kangaroos. Rosenfeld played his first game against Broughton Rangers on 11 September 1909.

The club's golden period came around the time of the First World War. The club was able to assemble a team of players from across the British Empire who swept all before them. Known as "The Team of All Talents", they were led by Harold Wagstaff and are still regarded as one of the finest football teams ever to have played. In the five years leading up to the First World War they won 13 trophies.

Two members of the team, centre Harold Wagstaff and wing Albert Rosenfeld were honoured by inclusion in the original Rugby League Hall of Fame. They were later joined by the Cumberland second row Douglas Clark. Of just seventeen players to be elected to the Hall of Fame, no fewer than three were teammates in that famous Huddersfield side. In total, Huddersfield boast five representatives in the Hall of Fame, more than any other club.

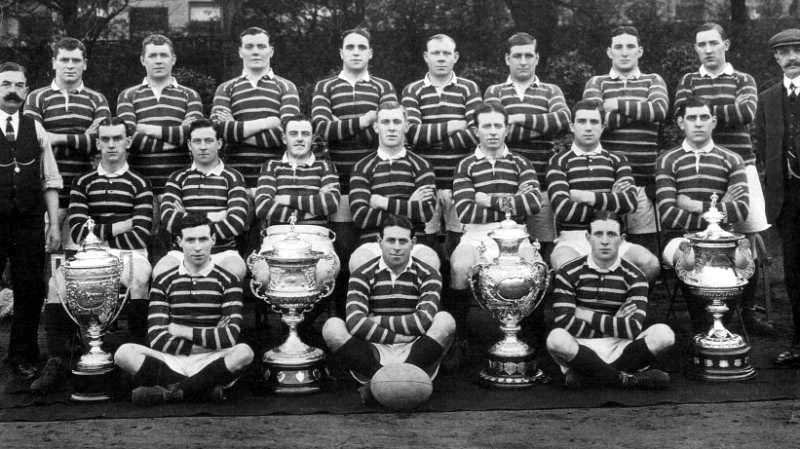
Huddersfield in 1915, posing with the "All Four Cups" won in the 1914–15 season: league championship, Challenge Cup, county league and county cup

The particular fame of "The Team of All Talents" sprung from their extraordinary three quarter play. In 1911–12, Rosenfeld became the first player to score more than 50 tries in a season – a feat previously thought to be impossible. That season he scored 78. His wing partner, Stan Moorhouse scored 52. In 1912–13, Rosenfeld scored 56, and then in 1913–14 he broke his own record with 80 tries, a record which stands to this day.

On 28 February 1914, the club defeated Swinton Park by a record 119–2 (Rosenfeld contributing 7 tries) in a Challenge Cup tie at Fartown. The record would stand until 26 November 1994 when the Huddersfield club broke their own World Record by defeating Blackpool Gladiators 142–4 in a Challenge Cup tie at the McAlpine Stadium – centre Greg Austin scoring 9 tries on his way to 52 tries that season, a world record for a centre. In the 1914–15 season they became only the second team to win "all four cups" when they lifted the Championship, the Challenge Cup, the Yorkshire County Cup, and the Yorkshire League. Huddersfield's dominance prior to the First World War was such that they went unbeaten in 38 consecutive matches before the suspension of the league in 1915.

Huddersfield did not take part in the 1918–19 season. In the 1919–20 season, the first five games were won for a 43 match unbeaten run over six years which still stands as a record today. The unbeaten run consisted of 28 league matches, 8 Yorkshire Cup-ties, 5 Challenge Cup-ties and 2 League Championship play-offs. In addition, Huddersfield were drawing 8–8 in a Yorkshire Cup-tie that was abandoned because of fog and replayed.

The Yorkshire Cup and Yorkshire League trophies were already won when Huddersfield met Wigan in the Challenge Cup final which resulted in a 21–10 victory. Widnes were defeated in the Championship semi-final and Hull F.C. waited at Headingley as Huddersfield strove for a clean sweep of silverware. Huddersfield were missing five players who were touring Australasia with Great Britain and Hull won 3–2.

Albert Rosenfeld's last game for the club was on 2 April 1921, a cup-tie against Leeds.

=== Post-war era ===
In the first full season after the war, a new record transfer fee of £1,650 was set when Dewsbury bought fullback Bill Davies from Huddersfield. Huddersfield won the League Championship in 1949, beating Warrington 13–12 in the final at Maine Road, Manchester in front of what was at the time a world record crowd of 75,194. This capitalised on a season which also brought home the Yorkshire League title. The highest attendance at Fartown to watch a Huddersfield game was 32,912 against Wigan on 4 March 1950. More success followed in the 1950 season as Huddersfield retained the Yorkshire League title and reached another Championship final at Maine Road. However, on this occasion Wigan proved too strong, winning 20 points to 12. Huddersfield did, however, win the Yorkshire cup with a 16–3 victory over Castleford at Headingley. On Saturday 17 November 1951, in an ordinary league game, Australian Lionel Cooper scored a club record ten tries, as Huddersfield defeated Keighley 48–3 at Fartown.

By the end of the 1950s, Huddersfield had won 3 Yorkshire cup finals, in 1950–51, 1952–53 and 1957–58, and the Challenge Cup final, in 1952–53. Huddersfield beat St. Helens 15–10 in the 1953 Challenge Cup Final at Wembley. Wakefield Trinity beat Huddersfield 16–10 in the 1960 Yorkshire County Cup Final at Headingley, Leeds on 29 October 1960. In the 1961–62 season Huddersfield were beaten by Wakefield Trinity in the Challenge Cup final but then the following week fortunes were reversed and Huddersfield won the Championship play off final at Odsal. This is the last major trophy the club collected. In 1962, the league was split into East and West of the Pennines; Huddersfield and Hull Kingston Rovers met at Headingley, Leeds in the first final of the Eastern Division Championship on Saturday 10 November 1962. Reigning Champions Huddersfield were favourites to lift the Eastern Division title, especially as Rovers were missing five first choice players with injuries. The Robins, however, set the early pace and were 10–0 up after 30 minutes. Despite a rally by Huddersfield, Rovers hung on to win 13–10.

=== 1970–1995: Decline and revival ===
By the 1970s, the club had become a shadow of its former self; the old Fartown ground had fallen into disrepair and the club frequently finished in the lower reaches of the league. Local businessman, John Bailey, took a controlling interest in the stadium, the club and the pavilion. In 1984, in an attempt to revive the club, Huddersfield adopted the name 'Barracudas' and Fartown was renamed Arena 84. As the crowds continued to stay away, it became clear that Bailey could not stem the decline.

Huddersfield Rugby League Club was on the point of collapse. A new board of directors took over in 1989 and injected some much needed financial resources into the club. The 'Barracudas' and 'Arena 84' names were dropped for the 1988–89 season. Nigel Stephenson was appointed as coach and Huddersfield were helped by several clubs, in particular Featherstone Rovers, to put a reasonable squad together. As well as beginning to improve the playing staff, the new owners also carried out a considerable amount of work on the Fartown stadium and by the end of the 1989–90 season significant progress was being made. Average crowds topped 1,000 for the first time in a decade.

Shortly after the 1991–92 season had begun, Alex Murphy took over as coach and Murphy led Huddersfield to become the first champions of the third division. Later, promotion to the Second Division had been achieved. This achievement came with expense and the club faced more ongoing financial difficulties. A new consortium who it was hoped would begin to shape the future of the club once again. Unable to secure funding to upgrade it, the club left Fartown without much of a fanfare and moved to Huddersfield Town's home ground at Leeds Road in 1992.

In 1993 six teams were invited to take part in an inaugural European Clubs Championship, the six teams consisted of two from the former USSR; Tiraspol and Moscow Magicians, two from France; AS Carcassonne and XIII Catalan, Batley and Huddersfield. Only weeks before departure, the plans collapsed as both Soviet clubs pulled out due to financial difficulties, closely followed by Batley and then Carcassonne who had just five players available due to a players' strike. This left just Huddersfield and XIII Catalan to meet in the "final" in Barcelona. The lead changed hands three times before Huddersfield held on for a 23–22 victory.

Following promotion as champions in 1991–92 Huddersfield finished a creditable 3rd in the 1992–93 second division, behind Featherstone and Oldham but then the receiver was called in. In March 1994, Huddersfield went into administration and then the receivers sacked Murphy as coach who was eventually replaced by George Fairburn. Under Fairburn's tenure, the club finished 3rd again in the second division in 1994–95 and reached the final of the Second Division premiership competition at Old Trafford losing out to rivals Keighley Cougars the season will also be fondly remembered for a run to the quarter final of the Challenge Cup, beating arch rivals Halifax who were riding high in the first division and then hammering The Cougars 30–0 at Keighley, a remarkable result considering Keighley had swept all before them and very rarely lost at home, finally, the run was ended by another rival, top flight Oldham, where over 8,000 including a travelling army of around 3,000 saw them go down eventually 23–12 to the top tier side.

In November 1994, Huddersfield set world records for score and winning margin when they beat Blackpool Gladiators 142–4, although Barrow Raiders equalled the winning margin a day later by beating Nottingham City 138–0. These records stood for almost 24 years until York City Knights beat West Wales Raiders by 144–0 in April 2018.

=== 1992–1994 Ground moves and the end of Fartown ===
In August 1992, following a 36–12 win over Ryedale York in a Yorkshire cup tie, although no one knew it at the time, it was to be the final game at Fartown, watched by 1,619 people, the next week, Huddersfield would begin their two year stint at the home of Huddersfield Town, however, plans had already been put in place for both the town's professional clubs to groundshare. After the move from Fartown and the two seasons at Leeds Road, Huddersfield RLFC took a share in the new McAlpine Stadium (now known as John Smith's Stadium), Huddersfield RLFC's final game at Leeds Road saw Dewsbury inflict a 28–12 defeat on the Fartowners in a second division game on Thursday 21 April 1994. The new facility opened in August 1994, originally with just two stands completed and Huddersfield's first game at the new ground saw Barrow thumped 50–12 in front of a crowd of 4,300. Although the reserves and junior teams continued to play at the ground, it was to be the final professional game played at the famous old ground.

=== 1996–1998: Ken Davy and the summer era begins ===
In 1996, rugby league in the UK saw a seismic change, the first tier of British rugby league clubs played the inaugural Super League season and the sport changed from a winter to a summer season. As the sport in Britain entered a new era it would be two years before Huddersfield rose again to the top level of the game. Ken Davy took over as chairman of Huddersfield and "Giants" was added to the team name, Davy's reign would last 30 years and the Giants moniker stuck.

Steve Ferres took over as coach and former GB great Garry Schofield joined Huddersfield for a six-figure sum. The first trophy under Davy's ownership came in 1997 at Old Trafford, where Huddersfield beat Hull Sharks 18-0 in the Divisional Championship final. In 1998, due to the collapse of Paris Saint-Germain the club was promoted to Super League despite only finishing second in the second division, behind Hull who finished as champions. After helping the Giants into Super League, Schofield took over the coaching reins replacing Steve Ferres with Huddersfield saying that they needed a full-time coaching staff. Huddersfield struggled to adapt to a return to top tier for the first time in 2 decades, struggles continued, the team struggled to compete, winning only a handful of games. Garry Schofield was removed as Huddersfield Giants' coach after 13 games, having picked up two wins. Schofield was replaced by his assistant Phil Veivers as caretaker coach. Schofield later successfully sued the club for unfair dismissal. It took Huddersfield's next three coaches more than 13 games to register two wins, with the club so far off the pace in their early Super League years.

=== 1999–2000: Huddersfield-Sheffield Giants ===
Mal Reilly then took over with Veivers back as assistant coach. Huddersfield finished bottom of Super League and Reilly was sacked at the end of the season. In late 1999, the club merged with Sheffield Eagles almost purely for financial reasons. Sheffield coach John Kear took over as head coach of the merged side. They were officially known as the Huddersfield-Sheffield Giants, but more popularly as 'Shuddersfield'. The Association of Premiership Clubs blocked proposals for a separate Huddersfield team in the Northern Ford Premiership. They played two home games in Sheffield at Bramall Lane with the others in Huddersfield, the away strip was in the Sheffield Eagles colours. In the 2000 season Huddersfield-Sheffield won only four games, three of them against rivals Wakefield Trinity Wildcats. This arrangement lasted only a season before the Huddersfield name was reverted to, due to rejection from both sets of fans. In the four seasons between 1998 and 2001, they lost 81 times in 99 matches, avoiding relegation for a variety of reasons.

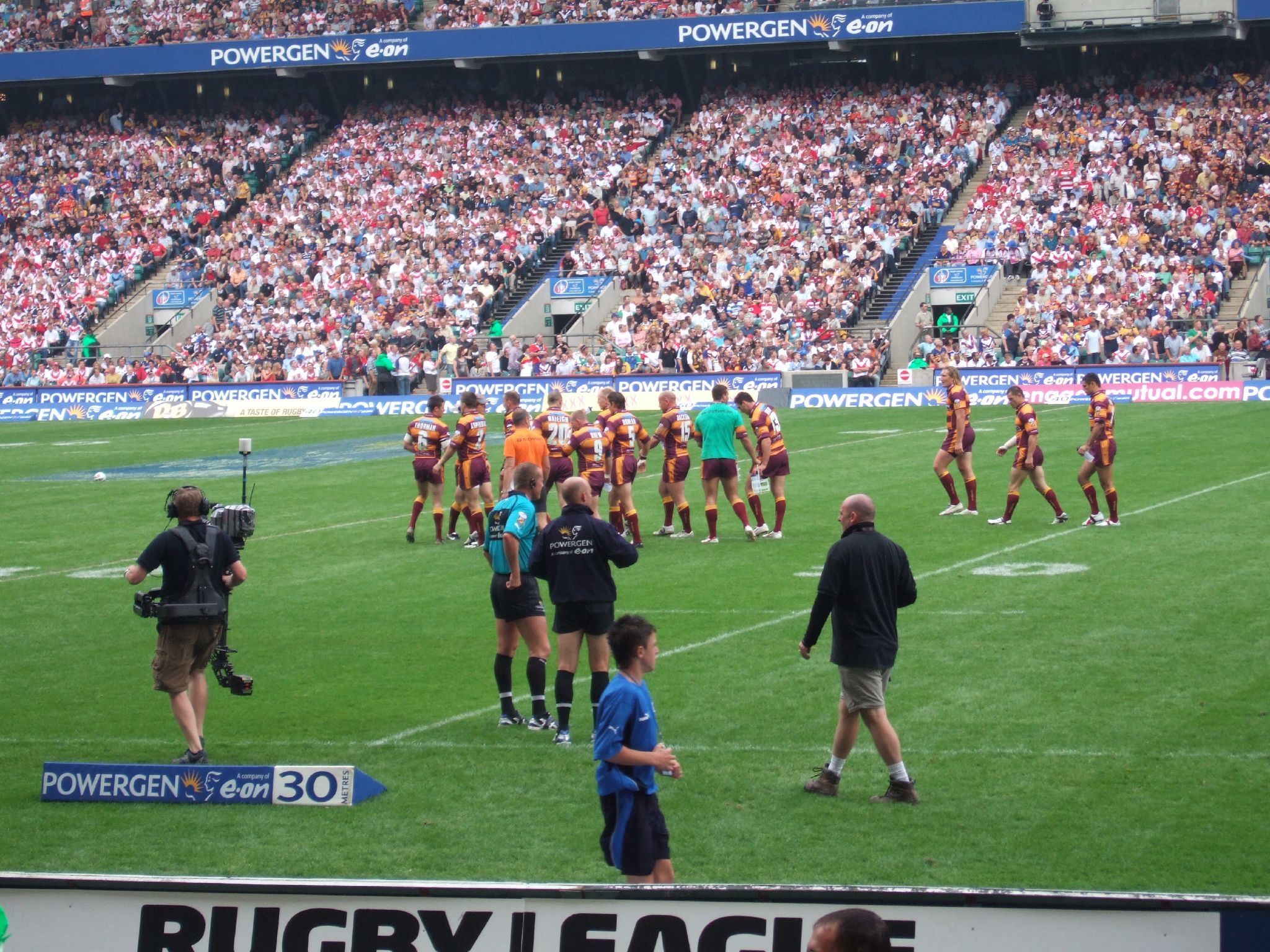
Huddersfield in the 2006 Challenge Cup Final

John Kear was sacked as coach and Veivers had a second spell as interim coach.

=== 2001–2004: Relegation and revival again ===
Australian Tony Smith was appointed as coach for the 2001 season after a rigorous process. This did not seem to have any effect as the club lost the first 14 matches of the season, culminating in a 78-point embarrassment by Bradford. This low point became a pivotal day for the club, however. The club won 6 and drew one of the remaining 14 games, only finishing bottom of the table after Wakefield Trinity's appeal against a 4-point salary cap deduction was successful. Widnes won the NFP competition that year and the club was seen to be fit to play in Super League. Huddersfield were finally relegated, ironically, after their best season in Super League to date.

In 2002 Huddersfield remained a full-time professional team despite playing in the Northern Ford Premiership. The club went unbeaten for the entire league season, drawing only one match and winning a record equalling 29 games. Along the way the team accumulated 1,156 points to equal the record for points in a league season achieved in 8 more games by Leigh in 1986. The team won the Buddies Cup, as it was then known, and also the NFP Grand Final against Leigh in October 2002, which secured promotion back to the Super League for the 2003 season.

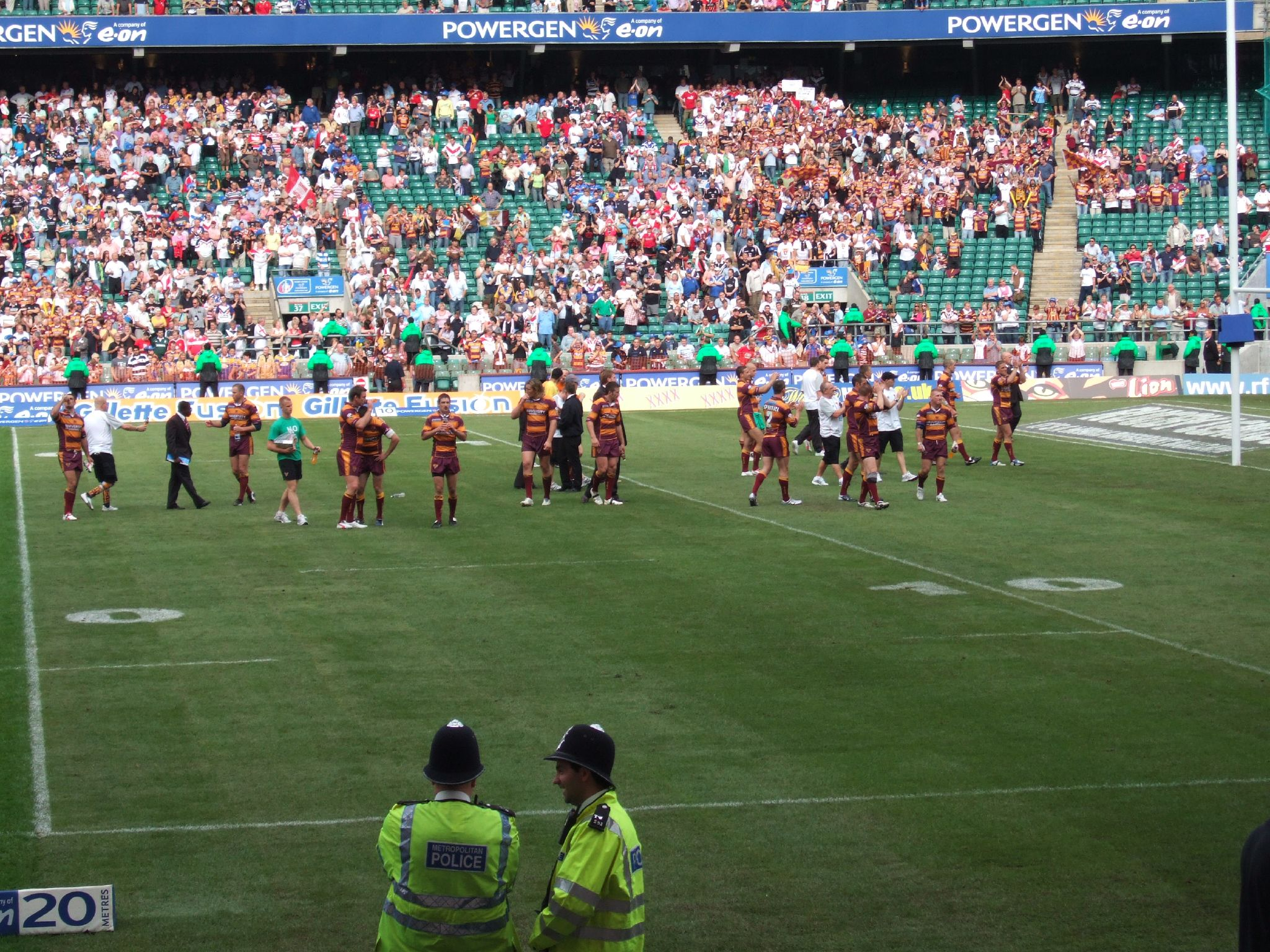
Huddersfield following their defeat by St. Helens in the 2006 Challenge Cup Final

In 2003 under Smith, Huddersfield Giants finally established themselves as a Super League club, earning notable wins over Leeds (first time since 1965 ending a remarkable streak of 30 defeats), Wigan and St Helens and finishing 10th, above Wakefield Trinity and Halifax. After guiding Huddersfield back to Super League, Smith and assistant coach Brian McDermott moved onto Headingley to take control of Leeds. St Helens assistant coach and former Hull forward Jon Sharp was appointed head coach for 2004 and the team improved again, finishing 7th in the league and making their first appearance in the Challenge Cup semi-finals since 1971.

=== 2005–2009: Resurgence ===
The beginning of the 2005 Super League season saw the club make its highest-profile signing in fifty years when Australian centre Michael De Vere signed from Brisbane Broncos, becoming the club's first Australian international player since Pat Devery in the 1950s.

For the kick off of the 2006 season the club unveiled a host of new signings to strengthen the squad, including New Zealand international scrum-half Robbie Paul. After a victory over Salford in the quarter final, the Giants faced Leeds in the Challenge Cup semi-final at Odsal, Bradford. Huddersfield won, despite being considered underdogs. Stuart Donlan and Chris Nero with 2 tries apiece and Michael De Vere with a try and five goals steering them to a 30–12 victory. Huddersfield lost the 2006 Challenge Cup Final to eventual Super League champions St. Helens 42–12.

The start of the 2007 season saw Huddersfield make some exciting signings, including Wests Tigers trio, Jamahl Lolesi, John Skandalis and Shane Elford, as well as Ryan Hudson. The season started horrendously for Huddersfield in terms of results. After seven consecutive losses they found themselves marooned at the foot of the table, 5 points adrift, but ironically with the second best defence in the league. Large sections of the fans began to question the coach's ability and as a result crowds began to dwindle and morale was beginning to suffer.

By the end of May, the picture was totally different. Huddersfield had a Challenge Cup quarter-final to look forward to and had been on their longest ever winning streak since joining the Super League, nine games including two wins in the Challenge Cup including a 36–12 victory over Bradford in front of the Sky Television cameras on 18 May, Huddersfield's first victory over Bradford since 1972 and ending a run of 20 consecutive defeats in the Super League era. In addition, John Sharp was named consecutively as Coach of the Month for April and May.

Huddersfield's winning run came to an unexpected end in a shock 14–12 defeat by Salford at the Willows. They had been overwhelming favourites with fans and bookies. Following the 2006 Challenge Cup Final appearance, Giants continued their progress by beating Wakefield Trinity for the 9th consecutive occasion to qualify for the play-offs for the first time and a match against Hull F.C. at the KC Stadium, which was lost 22–16.

The opening 2 matches in 2008 were lost, to Leeds and to Bradford. However the 3rd match saw Sharp's team beat Castleford 64–12. After a 48–0 loss to Catalans Dragons and a run of disappointing results, Sharp's contract was terminated by Huddersfield. Following Sharp's departure from the club in 2008, Kieron Purtill had a brief spell as caretaker coach alongside Paul Anderson.

Club chairman Ken Davy brought in a new head coach, Nathan Brown, and a new set of new players for the 2009 season. The season would prove to be the best the club had had for many years, new signing Brett Hodgson went on to win the Super League Man of Steel award and Huddersfield also picked up awards for Club of the Year and Coach of the Year for Brown. The Giants finished 3rd in the league and managed to reach the final of the Challenge Cup and marked the claret and gold's first appearance at Wembley since 1962, however, they lost, somewhat controversially, 25–16 to league rivals Warrington, the team responded to their cup defeat by finishing the season in 3rd place but lost in the play-offs twice. Firstly to St. Helens away from home and then at home to Catalans Dragons but Huddersfield Giants were now a force in English Rugby League again.

=== 2010–2017: League leaders and decline ===
Another decent season in 2010 saw the Giants finish the regular season in 5th, winning their last 5 games, but yet again, the play offs proved a tough nut to crack, following wins over Crusaders and a memorable win at Warrington, they succumbed to St Helens, playing their last ever game at Knowsley Road just 1 game away from the grand final. 2011 saw a 4th place finish, and included Huddersfield's first win at Leeds since 1960 when a Danny Brough inspired Giants routed the Rhinos 38–4 but the Rhinos would get revenge, ending the Giants' season in the play offs, there was another cup quarter final appearance but the Giants lost to Castleford.

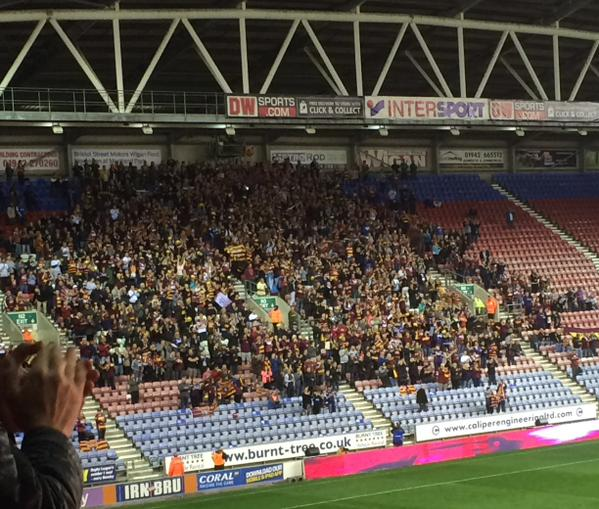
Huddersfield supporters at Wigan

After another recruitment drive from Huddersfield, they were yet again projected to advance in the Super League in 2012. This season really saw their team go from leading the Super League up to the halfway point but then tailing off to finish a disappointing 7th and yet again failing to make an impact on the play-offs, being comfortbaly beaten by Hull, However, another cup run gave the fans hope but they came up against a red-hot Warrington side in the semi final who beat them 33–6. During the season and during the poor dip in form Ken Davy decided it was time for change and terminated the contracts of coach Nathan Brown and captain Kevin Brown. Paul Anderson was given the task of finishing the season as best as possible, it was a sad end to Both Brown's Huddersfield careers.

2013 was seen as somewhat of a transition season, with Anderson able to mould his own team after taking over midway through a tumultuous period the previous year, however, Anderson's charges got off to a flyer, recording their first win at St Helens since 1978 with a 40–4 drubbing, that form kept up and Huddersfield found themselves in the top 2 for most of the season, a 30–12 hammering of Wigan, signalled the end of Wigan's challenge and Huddersfield won the League Leader's Shield, the first time they have finished top of the league in 81 years by hammering Rivals Wakefield 40–0. 5 of the team were selected for the Super League Dream Team, more than any other club, however, once again the play offs proved too much for the Giants, following a weakened team finishing the regular season with a big defeat at Bradford, Wigan beat Huddersfield in the first stage of the play off, meaning the Giants missed the chance to finally book a place at Old Trafford for the grand final, they were given a second chance however, and after seeing off Hull with a sublime performance to win 76–18, they again came unstuck at the hands of the Warrington Wolves and their season ended in bitter disappointment again.

In 2014, the club celebrated the 100th anniversary of the "Team of all Talents" who won All Four Cups in 1914, by playing in heritage jerseys to commemorate the feat, another 3rd place regular season finish saw another defeat in the play offs, this time, at the hands of Catalans Dragons at home, following a 57–4 hammering at Wigan in the first round. 2015 saw another push, but this time a 4th place finish, and after finishing 3rd in the 'Super 8's' earned another crack at Old Trafford, but again, the club failed to take the next step, beaten 32–8 at Wigan.

During the 2016 season, after a run of bad form, the Giants won only 1 out of their first 10 games, and lying at the bottom of the table, Anderson was dismissed as head coach, with Andy Kelly taking charge on an interim basis for a few games. It was later announced that the club had agreed terms with Australian Rick Stone to be the replacement head coach. Stone could not halt the slide and the club finished bottom of the regular season table for the first time since 2001, following the introduction of the 'Super 8's' the season before, the Giants narrowly avoided the relegation play off game by beating Hull KR 23–22 in their final game of the season.

2017 saw an overall improvement for the Giants as they finished 8th at the end of the regular season. A poor start to the season, not helped by injuries, culminated with the club being dumped out of the challenge cup at the first attempt by championship side Swinton, following the death of Jennifer Davy, long time supporter and wife of owner and chairman Ken, the team saw a more successful finish after the mid-season signings of Jordan Turner and Jordan Rankin, the week after the Swinton defeat, and with the club still in mourning for Mrs Davy, they went to Leeds with a depleted side and beat the Rhinos 31–12 in a highly emotional night for everyone concerned with the club. Following the Super8s, they remained in 8th. It was announced in September that Giants' prop Sebastine Ikahihifo had achieved a place in the Super League Dream Team after a highly impressive performance that season.

==== 2017: Women's Side ====
In December 2017, it was announced that Huddersfield would be fielding an under 19s girls side for the 2018 season, with the overall aim of producing a competitive Women's Super League team in 2019. Trials were held in January 2018. Huddersfeild Giants women team have played in the Women's super league since 2021, in the 2022 season they finished bottom of the league, but avoided relegation.

Only three years after forming, Huddersfield Giants Women won the Super League shield final in October 2021 by beating Featherstone Rovers 24–22 at Headingley and reached the Challenge Cup quarter final in 2022 but lost to reigning champions St Helens

=== 2018–2024: Woolford out, Watson failure ===
Following a disappointing start to the 2018 season in which Huddersfield only won two of their opening seven games, head coach Rick Stone was sacked. former player, captain and academy coach Chris Thorman was announced as head coach on an interim basis to lead the team over the Easter period, Thorman could not stop the rot though, losing five and drawing one of his six games in charge. On 29 April 2018, former Canberra Raiders and St. George Illawarra Dragons player Simon Woolford was announced as the Giants new head coach, Woolford turned things around somewhat, winning 12 of his first 14 games as head coach, there was also a cup quarter final defeat at the hands of the Catalans Dragons but Huddersfield lost their last five games of the 'Super 8's' as Woolford's honeymoon period ended. Woolford's first full season in 2019 was a difficult one, a bad start saw them languishing bottom before a brief pick up saw them up to 8th, but they could not sustain it and eventually finished 10th out of 12 teams. 2020 saw a good start, winning four of the first five games and sitting 2nd on the ladder, a cup defeat at the hands of Toronto Wolfpack in March was disappointing but it proved to be the last game before the Covid pandemic struck, when the season resumed in August, with no crowds and at neutral grounds, the Giants could not replicate their early season form and they slipped down to 8th, despite being popular with the fans, Woolford left the Giants in September 2020 after being unable to agree a new contract, Luke Robinson took over as interim head coach until the end of season.

In 2020, the club announced that it had appointed Ian Watson as head coach from Salford starting in the 2021 Super League season. Watson was seen as the sports' 'best British coach' after taking unfaniced Salford to a grand final and a challenge cup final, losing them both, but his Salford sides were seen as strong, fit, entertaining and hard to beat, his stock grown as Salford, like Huddersfield, had smaller crowds and smaller financial pull as other clubs, Watson was brought in to completely overhaul the playing and conditioning side of the club. The club had a disappointing year in the 2021 season finishing seventh on the table and missing the play off series but there did appear to be a change in attitude of the playing squad, Watson disposed of high profile, high earning players who were not prepared to do things his way and follow his processes.

2022 became Huddersfield's best season in a decade with Watson repeating his success with Salford when he steered Huddersfield to the Challenge cup final in May 2022, a comprehensive 25–4 semi final win over favourites Hull Kingston Rovers at Elland Road secured a final place against Wigan Warriors at Tottenham Hotspur Stadium.On 28 May 2022, Huddersfield played in the 2022 Challenge Cup Final against Wigan. Huddersfield led Wigan for nearly the entire match until Wigan scored a try with two minutes remaining to win the game 16–14 and deny Huddersfield their first major trophy win in 60 years. Huddersfield would finish the 2022 Super League season in third place on the table. In the elimination play off, Huddersfield suffered a shock 28–0 loss against Salford which ended their season. but hopes were high that the Watson effect was finally taking over. Hopes for the 2023 Season were high following a decent 2022 but the team struggled to replicate their form and their playing style from 2022, following consecutive nillings, Huddersfield were dumped out of the cup at the first attempt by Watson's old club, Salford, 4 heavy defeats followed putting pressure on Watson, who was required to get positive results and who the club had high hopes for, instead the Giants found themselves in 10th place and with their season petering out disappointingly, unrest about Watson's methods were starting to grow. Huddersfield had a difficult campaign finishing ninth on the table and missing the playoffs.

In the 2024 Super League season, Huddersfield had a decent start, winning seven of their first ten games but the season would soon mirror the previous year, Watson was now under serious pressure, with his methods, performance and results scrutinised, following a run of one win in nine games, including a humiliating 46–10 pasting by Warrington in a cup semi final and with crowds dwindling rapidly, Watson was relieved of his duties following another (0–48) defeat at Warrington. Luke Robinson was once again given the interim head coach role but the damage was done with the club once again finishing 9th on the table.

=== 2025–present ===
It was announced in September 2024 that Luke Robinson had been appointed head coach on a three-year deal. Huddersfield started the 2025 Super League season poorly as they lost their opening nine games. In round 10, the club managed to earn their first victory over the season, defeating Hull F.C. 12–10 at Magic Weekend. Huddersfield would eventually finish the 2025 Super League season in 10th place on the table.. In July 2026, longstanding owner and chairman Ken Davy stood down amidst ongoing changes within the clubs' hierarchy, director for change Ralph Rimmer became the clubs Executive Chairman with immediate effect, it ended Davy's 30 year reign as both owner and chair of the club as he handed all executive power to Rimmer although Davy will remain as the Giants owner and major financial backer. On 8 August 2026, it was announced that Huddersfield would be relocating all their home games to Dewsbury's Autex Acoustics Arena ahead of the 2027 season.

=== Academy/Youth system ===
Despite not being one of the bigger or successful clubs in Super League, the Giants have a substantial academy system, backed by the Supporters Association, who provide volunteers to run and promote the games and raise funds. In 2018, the academy team, under head of youth Andy Kelly and head coach Luke Robinson, placed in the top 4 grand final play off semi final for the first time. They were joined by Wigan, St Helens and Leeds, however lost 50–0 to Wigan.[21] Some of that team have now made the step up to first grade level and as of 2022 Jake Wardle, Oliver Russell, Innes Senior, Louis Senior, Sam Hewitt, Jon Luke Kirby, Matty English, Oliver Wilson, Ronan Michael, Dom Young have all made the step up to first grade rugby. Other graduates from the Giants academy include Leroy Cudjoe, Michael Lawrence and Jermaine McGillvary, also, Kruise Leeming, Jake Connor, Darnell McIntosh Sam Wood . As of 2022 there are currently 18 members of the first team squad who have graduated through Huddersfield's own youth system.

== Stadia ==
=== 1878–1992: Fartown Ground ===
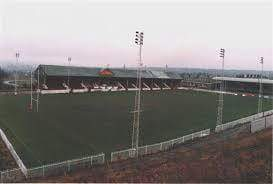
Main stand at Fartown

The Fartown Ground was originally a cricket ground before being occupied by Huddersfield rugby club in 1878. It hosted two Challenge Cup finals in 1908 and 1910 and hosted one football match. During the 1980s, the stadium fell into disrepair as Huddersfield struggled to attract crowds. Huddersfield left Fartown in 1992, but still used it as a training ground until 2004 and it still hosts amateur games.

=== 1992–1994: Leeds Road ===
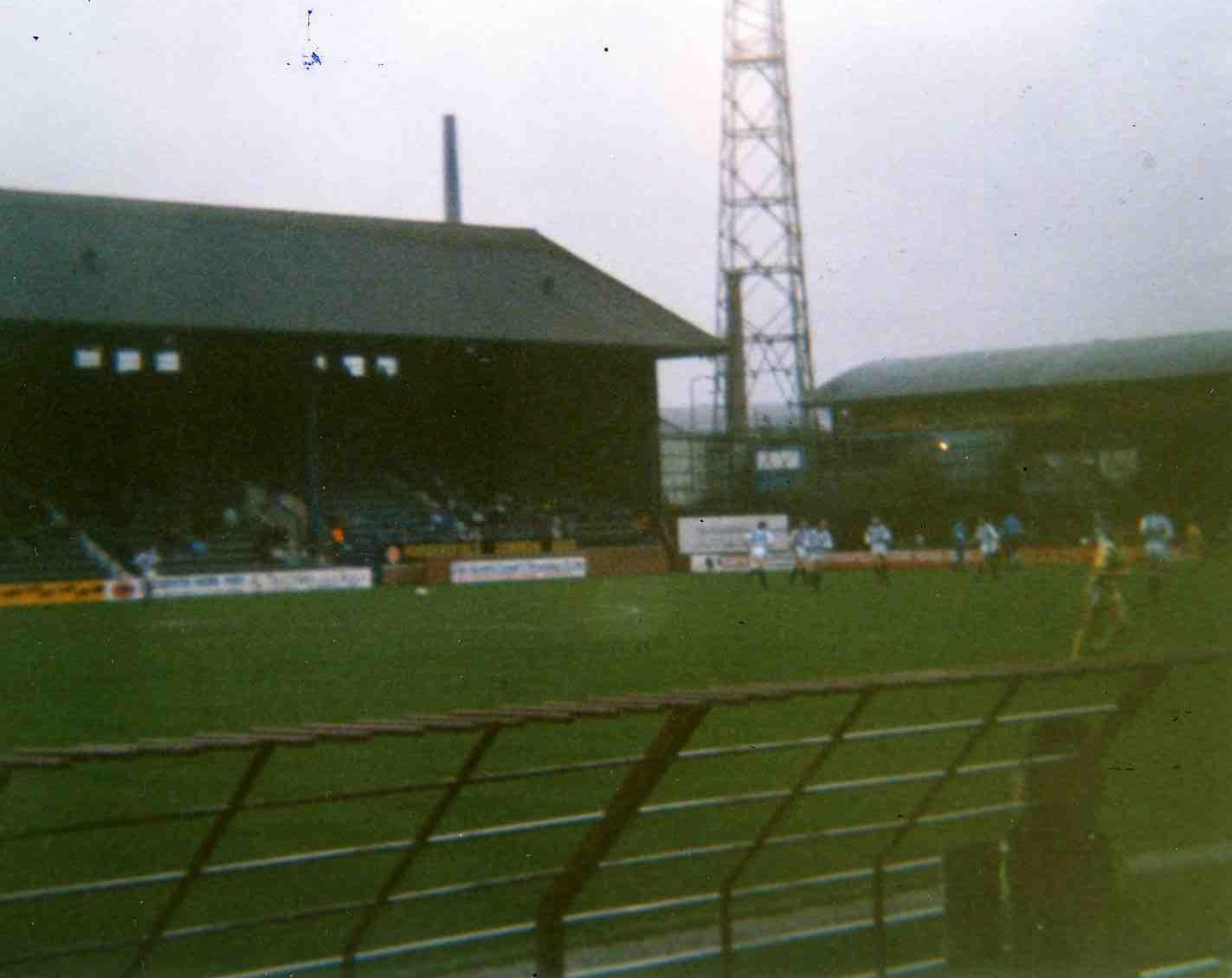
Leeds Road

From 1992, Huddersfield entered a ground shared with Huddersfield Town football club at Leeds Road.

=== 1994–2026: Kirklees Stadium ===
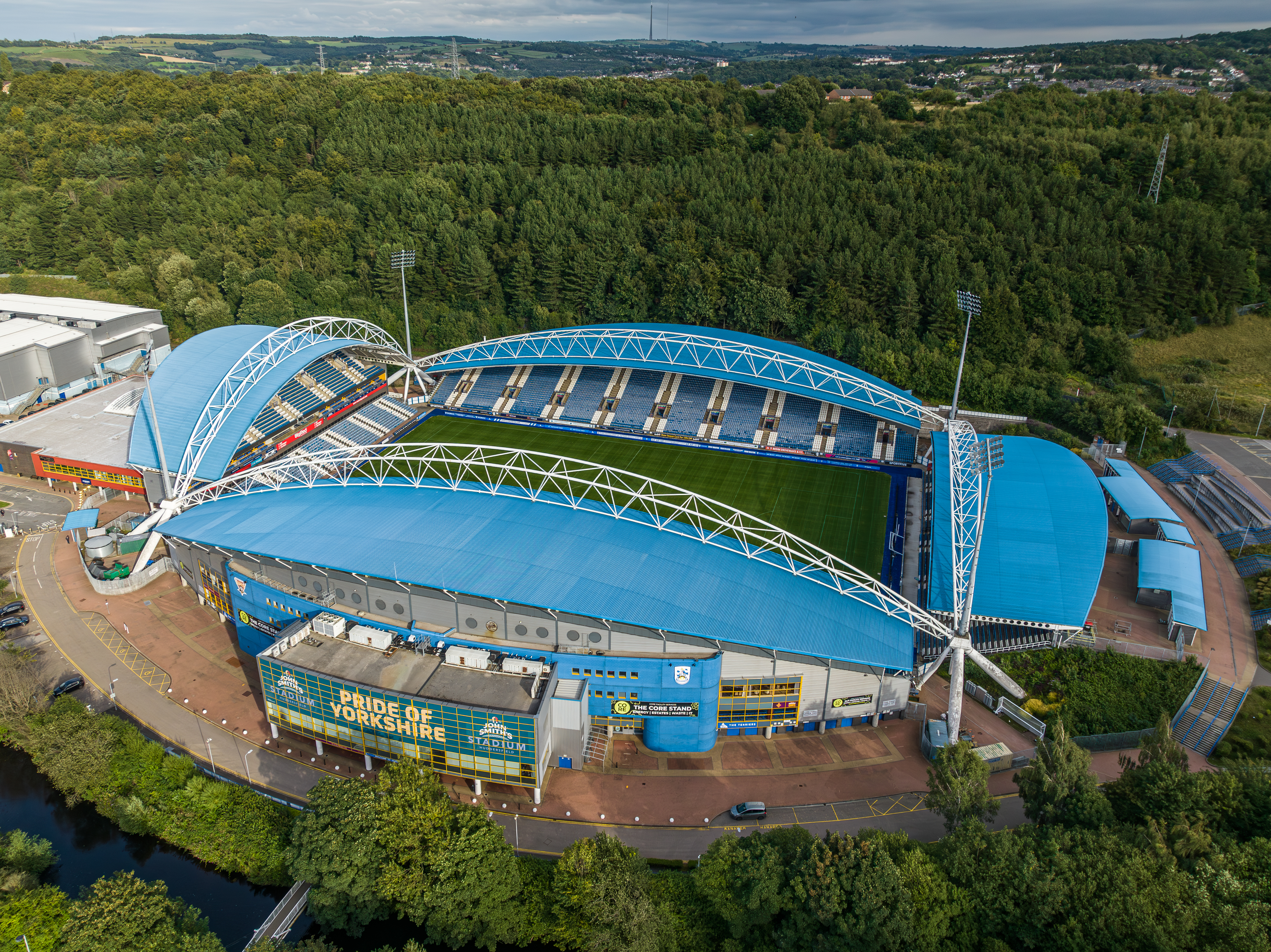
Kirklees Stadium

In 1994, both Huddersfield Giants and Huddersfield Town moved to the purpose built Kirklees Stadium. The stadium has hosted Challenge Cup semi finals on multiple occasions. The venue has a capacity of 24,500 with the Giants attendance record being 15,629 set on 10 February 2008 for match against rivals Leeds.

=== 2027-Present: Autex Acoustics Arena ===
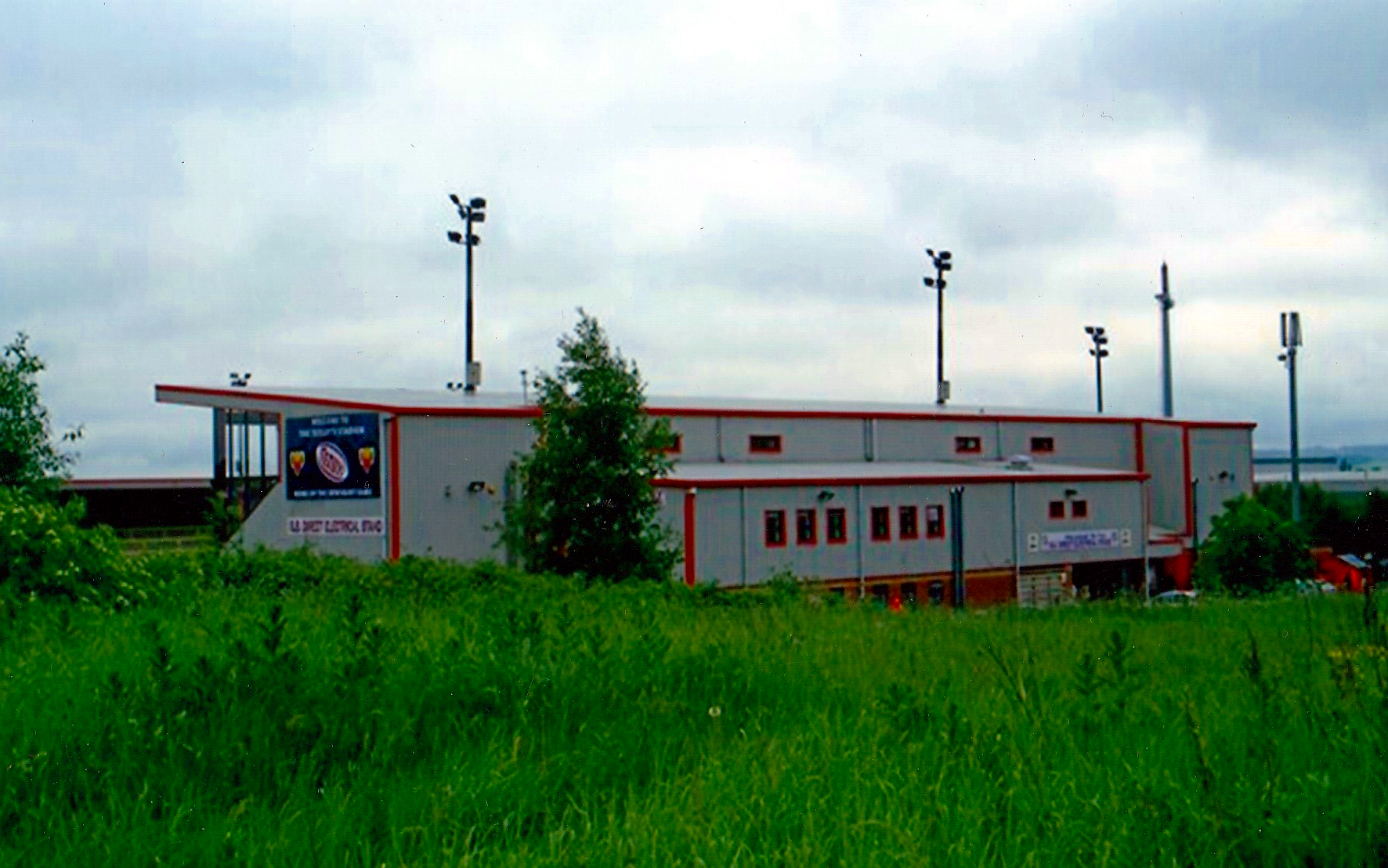
FLAIR Stadium

Following the 2026 season, it was announced that Huddersfield Giants would move to Dewsbury to play at the Autex Acoustics Arena, bringing 162 years of first class rugby in Huddersfield to an end.

=== Reserves stadium ===
The club's Academy, scholarship and Reserves side currently use the facilities at the Laund Hill complex which is home to Huddersfield YMCA Rugby Union club. From 2026, the site will be home to the Giants' elite performance training centre.

== Supporters ==
They have a fanbase of around 200–300 away fans and average 4,000+ at a majority of the home games, the fans have been nicknamed "the Cowbell Army" due to the presence of Cowbells amongst the crowd.

There is also a contingent of fans known as 'Block 7' at home games who sing, chant and creates a visual support for the team, this idea was developed in mid 2022. The Huddersfield Giants Supporters Association (HGSA) are a voluntary group of supporters which aims to raise funds for the academy and scholarship teams, they hosts regular guest speakers evenings, fundraising events and also collect donations for a local food bank charity. They also help organise and promote the club's reserves, under 18's Academy and Under 16's Scholarship games and raise valuable funds towards junior development, as well as liaising with the club on behalf of the supporters.

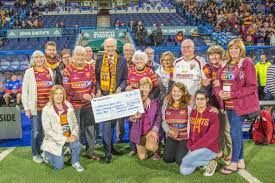
Some of the HGSA members presenting a cheque to Giants owner Ken Davy

In 2019 the group were nominated for an award in the prestigious Huddersfield Community Awards evening for their work in junior and community development.

== Kit sponsors and manufacturers ==
Year	Kit Manufacturer	Sponsor
2000	Stag	Friends Provident
2001–2002	Logitog	Friends Provident
2003	Outwear	Longley Park Kia
2004	Outwear	Microworld Computers
2005–2007	Outwear	University of Huddersfield
2008–2010	KooGa	University of Huddersfield
2011	KooGa	Carboodle
2012	KooGa	Q-Connect
2013–2016	KooGa	Bond It
2017–2019	O'Neills	Bond It
2020–2022	PlayerLayer/Oxen	Venari
2022–2029	Oxen	Bond It

== Coaches ==
- Joe Withers c. 1927–28 season
- Chris Brockbank 1933–35
- Alex Fiddes 19??–??
- Russell Pepperell 19??–??
- Ernie Ashcroft 1958–61
- Dave Valentine 19??–??
- Jack Scroby 1970–??
- Ian Brooke 1979–80
- Maurice Bamford 1980–81
- Les Sheard 1981–82
- Brian Lockwood 1984
- Chris Forster 1985–86
- Jack Addy 1987
- Neil Whittaker 1988
- Nigel Stephenson 1989
- Barry Seabourne 1990–91
- Alex Murphy 1991–94
- George Fairbairn 1994–96
- Darryl Van De Velde 1996
- Steve Ferres 1997
- Garry Schofield 1998
- Phil Veivers
- Mal Reilly 1999
- John Kear 1999–2001
- Phil Veivers 2001
- Tony Smith 2001–03
- Jon Sharp 2003–08
- Kieron Purtill & Paul Anderson 2008
- Nathan Brown 2009–12
- Paul Anderson 2013–16
- Andy Kelly (interim) 2016
- Chris Thorman (interim) 2016
- Rick Stone 2016–18
- Chris Thorman (interim) 2018
- Simon Woolford 2018–20
- Luke Robinson (interim) 2020
- Ian Watson 2021–24
- Luke Robinson 2024–26
- Liam Finn (interim) 2026

== 2027 squad ==
2027 Huddersfield Giants squad
First team squad			Coaching staff
(England) Jacob Algar – PR; (Australia) Logan Aoake – WG, CE; (Australia) Jake Arthur – SH, SO; (England) Jack Billington – LF, SR, PR; (England) Logan Blacker – FB; (England) Tom Burgess – PR; (Ireland) Connor Carr – CE; (France) Mathieu Cozza – PR, LF; (England) Jordan Crowther – LF, HK, SR; (Australia) Zane Dunford – SR; (England) Niall Evalds – FB, WG; (England) George Flanagan Jnr – FB, SO, SH (gk); (England) Joe Greenwood – SR	(England) Sam Halsall – CE, WG; (England) Matty Hanley – CE, WG; (England) Sam Hewitt – SR; (England) Jeylan Hodgson – HK, LF; (England) Lewis Jagger – WG, CE; (Ireland) Jaimin Jolliffe – PR; (Ireland) George King – PR; (England) Marshall Land – SH, SO; (England) Kruise Leeming – HK; (England) Oli Leyland – SO, SH, FB; (Tonga) Tui Lolohea – SO, FB	(Australia) Asher O'Donnell – SR; (Australia) Chris Patolo – PR; (Australia) Tristan Powell – PR; (England) Fenton Rogers – PR; (Ireland) Harry Rushton (vc) – SR, LF; (England) Roman Sharma – WG; (England) Adam Swift – WG; (England) Archie Sykes – LF, SR; (England) Will Tate – CE, WG; (England) Toby Warren – SR; (England) Connor Wrench – CE, WG; (Australia) Zac Woolford – HK; (France) Tanguy Zenon – FB, CE, WG	Head coach: (Australia) Jim Lenihan; Assistant coaches: (Ireland) Liam Finn; (England) Leroy Cudjoe; Legend: (c) Captain(s); (vc) Vice-captain(s); (red card) = suspended; = injured; (gk) = Goal kicker; Updated: Source(s): First team

== 2027 transfers ==
=== Players in ===
Player	From	Contract	Date
(Ireland) Jaimin Jolliffe	Gold Coast Titans	3 years	24 July 2026
(England) Oli Leyland	Warrington Wolves	1 year	25 August 2026
(England) Jordan Crowther	Warrington Wolves	3 years	10 September 2026
(England) Jeylan Hodgson	Goole Vikings	2 years	7 September 2026
(England) Kruise Leeming	Wigan Warriors	3 years	8 September 2026
(Australia) Jake Arthur	Hull FC	2 years	9 September 2026
(England) Will Tate	Wakefield Trinity	2 years	21 September 2026
(Australia) Logan Aoake	Newcastle Knights	2 years	6 October 2026
(England) Toby Warren	Birmingham Hurricanes	2 years	10 November 2026

=== Players out ===
Player	To	Contract	Date
(England) Matty English	York Knights	2 years	29 July 2026
(Australia) Jacob Gagai	Warrington Wolves	2 years	9 September 2026
(Jamaica) Kieran Rush			10 September 2026
(England) Monty Lumb	Dewsbury Rams	1 year	14 September 2026
(Australia) Adam Clune	Newcastle Knights	1 year	30 October 2026
(Fiji) Taane Milne	South Sydney Rabbitohs	1 year	12 November 2026

== Players ==
=== Hall of Fame inductees ===
Seven Huddersfield rugby league players have been inducted into the Rugby League Hall of Fame:

- Douglas "Doug/Dougie/Duggy" Clark
- Neil Fox
- Mick Sullivan
- Albert Rosenfeld
- Harold Wagstaff
- Garry Schofield
- Eorl Crabtree

In 2006, Rosenfeld became only the second rugby league player to be inducted into the International Jewish Sports Hall of Fame.

== Men's honours ==
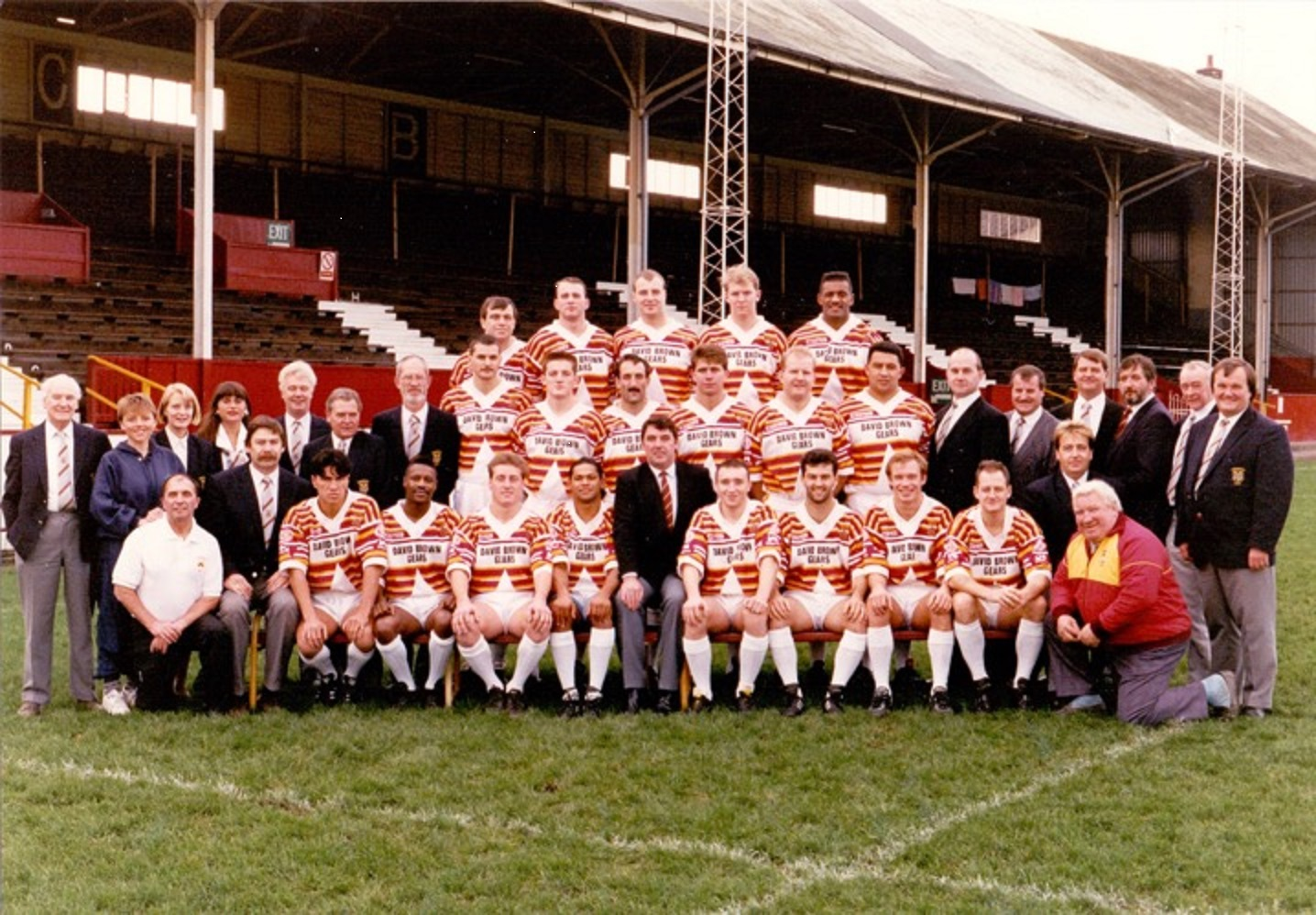
The 3rd Division title winning squad in front of the main stand at Fartown

=== League ===
- Division 1/ Super League:

Winners (7): 1911–12, 1912–13, 1914–15, 1928–29, 1929–30, 1948–49, 1961–62

- League Leaders:

Winners (1): 2013

- Bottom 14 Championship:

Winners (1): 1964–65

- Division 2/ Championship:

Winners (2): 1974–75, 2002

- Division 3/ League 1:

Winners (1): 1991–92

- RFL Yorkshire League:

Winners (11): 1911–12, 1912–13, 1913–14, 1914–15, 1919–20, 1921–22, 1928–29, 1929–30, 1948–49, 1949–50, 1951–52

=== Cup ===
- Challenge Cup:

Winners (6): 1912–13, 1914–15, 1919–20, 1932–33, 1944–45, 1952–53

- RFL Yorkshire Cup:

Winners (12): 1909–10, 1911–12, 1913–14, 1914–15, 1918–19, 1919–20, 1926–27, 1931–32, 1938–39, 1950–51. 1952–53, 1957–58

- RFU Yorkshire Cup:

Winners (1): 1890

- Championship Cup:

Winners (1): 2002

== Women's honours ==
- RFL Women's Super League Shield:

Winners (1): 2021

== Records (men) ==
=== Player records ===
- Most tries in a match: 10 by Lionel Cooper vs Keighley, 17 November 1951
- Most goals in a match: 18 by Major Holland vs Swinton Park, 28 February 1914
- Most points in a match: 39 by Major Holland vs Swinton Park, 28 February 1914
- Most tries in a season: 80 by Albert Rosenfeld, 1913–14
- Most goals in a season: 148 by Danny Brough, 2013
- Most points in a season: 332 by Danny Brough, 2013

=== Team records ===
- Highest score: 142–4 vs Blackpool Gladiators, 26 November 1994
- Highest attendance: 32,912 vs Wigan, League, at Fartown, 4 March 1950
- Highest attendance (neutral game): 35,136 Leeds vs Wakefield Trinity, RL Challenge Cup Semi-Final, at Fartown, 19 April 1947
- Most consecutive wins in Super League: 8 games (2013).
- Highest attendance vs an international touring team: 26,017 vs Australia, (1948–49 Kangaroo tour)

=== All-time records ===
- Most tries by any player in a season: 80 by Albert Rosenfeld, 1913–14
- Most tries by a centre in a season: 52 by Greg Austin, 1994–95
- Most tries by a centre in a game: 9 by Greg Austin, vs Blackpool Gladiators, 26 November 1994
- Highest score: 142–4 vs Blackpool Gladiators, as above
- Highest winning margin: 138 vs Blackpool Gladiators, as above
- Longest unbeaten run: 43 matches, 1914–1919
- Unbeaten in a season: 28 games (27 wins, 1 draw), 2001–02
- Most points scored in a season: 1,156, 2001–2002
