= 1989 European Club Challenge =

Rugby league match

AS Saint-Estève	Widnes RLFC
(FFRXIII)	(RFL)
6	60
	1	2	Total
STE	0	6	6
WID	32	28	60
- Date: 27 May 1989
- Stadium: Stade municipal Fernand-Fournier
- Location: Arles, Bouches-du-Rhône, France
- Man of the Match: Rick Thackray
- Referee: Ray Tennant (England)
- Attendance: 350

Broadcast partners
- Broadcasters: Screensport (European Union)
- Commentators: Keith Macklin (United Kingdom); Gérard Hérens (France); Stefan Heinrich (West Germany)

The 1989 European Club Challenge, also promoted as The Champions Cup, was an international rugby league contest pitting RFL champions Widnes RLFC against French representatives AS Saint-Estève. Played on 27 May 1989 in Arles, France, after several delays, the game also served as a European qualifier for the 1989 World Club Challenge.

== Background ==
=== World Club Challenge qualifier ===
Anglo-French challenges have been an on-and-off practice since the introduction of the game to France in the mid-1930s. The 1989 incarnation was originally set up as a European qualifier for a World Club Championship against the champions of Australia. At an early stage, the event was projected to take place during the 1988 Christmas holidays in a home-and-home format. The dates of 1 March and 12 March 1989 were eventually chosen. As the 1988–89 national championships would not yet be decided by March, the participants were the 1987–88 title holders, Widnes RLFC and US Le Pontet XIII. However, due to logistical difficulties involving the intended location of Japan, the WCC was seemingly cancelled in October 1988. Although Widnes initially vouched to go on with the European Challenge regardless, the English club soon lost interest in the lesser continental event, and asked it to be axed so that the dates could be filled with outstanding championship fixtures that had been displaced by Trophy games earlier in the season. This was granted, and both dates were reassigned to a home-and-home against Castleford.

=== Rescheduling ===
However, the French federation still wished that the ECC be played, and the RFL obliged despite Widnes' qualms about costs and schedule overload. As a compromise, the contest would now take place in Avignon, France, on 28 May in a single-game format. Widnes were promised that their travel expenditures would be covered by gate revenue, and that they would receive fifty percent of ground advertising. At the demand of broadcaster Screensport, the game was moved forward one day and rescheduled for 27 May. The information was belatedly relayed to Widnes, aggravating their already disinterested coach Doug Laughton, who unsuccessfully pleaded with management to pull the plug on the event. The date change also threw a wrench into the plans of about half of Widnes' 1,200 traveling fans, who were due to arrive on the day of the game. Some were able to reschedule their trip with the help of local travel agencies. Mid-May, it was announced that the World Club Championship was back on with an October 1989 date.

=== Le Pontet withdrawal ===
Although the European Club Challenge's new date fell shortly after the conclusion of England and France's 1988–89 championships, it was decided in advance to stick with the original participants, Widnes and Le Pontet, as chosen based on the 1987–88 results. While the French representatives were not viewed as a serious threat to any respectable RFL team, Le Pontet's players were preceded by a reputation for unruly behaviour, following several incidents in the later stages of their domestic season. Laughton and referee Ray Tennant warned the Gallic side to curb its temper or there would be little chance of renewing the ECC experiment in subsequent years.

However, at just three days' notice, Widnes were informed that Le Pontet had decided to withdraw, arguing that they had been victimized by unfair disciplinary rulings during and after their upset loss against St. Estève in the 1989 French championship final. The French federation hastily moved the game from Avignon to Arles, about 25 miles away, and summoned new French champions St. Estève to replace Le Pontet. Widnes manager John Stringer was appalled by the organizational chaos, but vouched to soldier on so as to not disappoint the fans who had booked their trip.

== Squads ==
=== Widnes RLFC ===
The lightly regarded event represented an opportunity for some fringe players on the powerhouse English club. Fullback Alan Tait, sidelined with a shoulder injury, was replaced as a starter by David Marsh, a recruit from Blackbrook. Andy Currier and team star Martin Offiah were already in Australia with their summer teams. Brimah Kebbie, who had only played two games with the main team, partly due to injuries, substituted for the latter. Rick Thackray returned to the line-up after being left off the Premiership final roster.

Fullback: David Marsh
Threequarters: Rick Thackray, Darren Wright, Jonathan Davies, Brimah Kebbie
Halfbacks: Tony Myler (fly-half), Paul Hulme (scrum-half)
Forwards: Kurt Sorensen (c), Phil McKenzie, Joe Grima, Mike O'Neill, Emosi Koloto, Richard Eyres
Reserves: Derek Pyke, Paul Moriarty, David Smith

=== AS Saint-Estève ===
Saint-Estève's team was also somewhat different than the one that played in French championship final.

Fullback: Jean-Philippe Pougeau
Threequarters: Hugues Ratier, Brian Coles, Michel Roses, Jean-Luc Tène
Halfbacks: Roger Palisses (fly-half), Bruno Castany (scrum-half)
Forwards: David Barker, Mathieu Khedimi, Abet Baklouch, Morio Femia, Bernard Cartier, Steve Robinson
Reserves: Bernard Guasch, Patrick Alberola, ???

== Match ==
Saturday, 27 May 1989

AS Saint-Estève	6–60	Widnes RLFC
Tries: Pougeau; Goals: Coles		Tries: Thackray (4), Davies (2), Grima (2), Marsh, Moriarty, Kebbie; Goals: Davies (5), Kebbie (3)

Stade municipal Fernand-Fournier, Arles
Attendance: 350
Referee: Ray Tennant (England)
Player of the Match: Rick Thackray

=== Summary ===
The game was an altogether lopsided affair, reflecting the loss of stature of French rugby league during the 1970s and 1980s. Widnes' first 22 points were scored by only two players, Rick Thackray and prized union recruit Jonathan Davies. Brimah Kebbie and Paul Moriarty, less successful union defectors who had struggled to establish themselves with the team, also seized their chance. Kebbie, who had not played since 14 December, made the most of the opportunity, and earned kudos from coach Laughton, despite not playing on his favorite wing. Moriarty scored his first try with the team. Youngster David Marsh also got in on the action at the 25th minute, chasing a long kick from Tony Myler for a try of his own. As St. Estève was already lagging by 54 points, the French team got a consolation try, with Jean-Philippe Pougeau capping a long counterattack following a scrum with seven minutes to go. It was converted by Australian Brian Coles.

== Post match ==
The championship trophy was handed to Widnes captain Kurt Sorensen by French rugby league federation president Jean-Paul Verdaguer. Two busses of Widnes fans who had gotten lost arrived as the trophy presentation was in progress, while a further 200 missed their ferry back in England. The game's impromptu relocation led to an embarrassing attendance, with a handful of locals and the few English fans that made it combining for a crowd as small as 350. The Manchester Evening News summed up the experience as a "French fiasco".

St. Estève coach Jacques Jorda was gracious in defeat, saying after the game that Widnes was better than Team Great Britain. Widnes' veteran prop Mike O'Neill struggled to find anything positive to say about the opposition, assessing that Saint-Estève was "only a little better than you see in amateur rugby league at home." Following the lopsided display, it was accepted that the French league had fallen too far behind professional standards, and that no representative of the country was likely to receive consideration for future World Club Challenges. Laughton assessed: "Unless the French get their act together, this competition has no chance of surviving."
