= 1995 Rugby League World Cup Group C =

1995 Rugby League World Cup Group C was one of the three groups in the 1995 Rugby League World Cup. The group consisted of France, Wales and Western Samoa.

== Ladder ==
Team	Pld	W	D	L	PF	PA	PD	Pts	Qualification
Wales	2	2	0	0	50	16	+34	4	Advanced to knockout stage
Western Samoa	2	1	0	1	66	32	+34	2	
France	2	0	0	2	16	84	−68	0	

== Wales vs France ==
9 October 1995

Wales	28 – 6	France
Tries: Anthony Sullivan (3); Iestyn Harris; John Devereux; Goals: Jonathan Davies (3); Iestyn Harris (1)		Tries: Patrick Torreilles Goals: Frédéric Banquet (1)

Ninian Park, Cardiff
Attendance: 10,250
Referee: Eddie Ward (Australia)

Wales	France

FB	1	Iestyn Harris
RW	2	John Devereux
RC	3	Allan Bateman
LC	4	Scott Gibbs
LW	5	Anthony Sullivan
SO	6	Jonathan Davies (c)
SH	7	Kevin Ellis
PR	8	Kelvin Skerrett
HK	9	Martin Hall
PR	10	Dai Young
SR	11	Paul Moriarty
SR	12	Mark Perrett
LK	13	Richard Eyres
Substitutions:
IC	14	Mark Jones
IC	15	Adrian Hadley
IC	16	Keiron Cunningham
IC	17	Rowland Phillips
Coach:
(Wales) Clive Griffiths

FB	1	David Despin
RW	2	Frédéric Banquet
RC	3	David Fraisse
LC	4	Pierre Chamorin
LW	5	Jean-Marc Garcia
SO	6	Pascal Fages
SH	7	Patrick Entat (c)
PR	8	Didier Cabestany
HK	9	Patrick Torreilles
PR	10	Frédéric Teixido
SR	11	Gaël Tallec
SR	12	Pascal Jampy
LF	13	Thierry Valero
Substitutions:
IC	14	Vincent Banet
IC	15	Karl Jaavuo
IC	16	Brian Coles
IC	17	Lilian Hébert
Coach:
(France) Ivan Grésèque

== Western Samoa vs France ==
12 October 1995

Western Samoa	56 – 10	France
Tries: Tony Tatupu (2); Vila Matautia (2); Va'aiga Tuigamala (2); Paki Tuimavave; Apollo Perelini; Brian Laumatia; Willie Swann; Goals: John Schuster (8)		Tries: Pierre Chamorin; Didier Cabestany Goals: Frédéric Banquet (1)

Ninian Park, Cardiff
Attendance: 2,173
Referee: Kelvin Jeffes (Australia)

Western Samoa	France

FB	1	Paki Tuimavave
RW	2	Brian Laumatia
RC	3	John Schuster (c)
LC	4	Va'aiga Tuigamala
LW	5	Lolani Koko
FE	6	Tea Ropati
HB	7	Willie Swann
PR	8	Se'e Solomona
HK	9	Willie Poching
PR	10	Fa'ausu Afoa
SR	11	Tony Tatupu
SR	12	Vila Matautia
LK	13	Tony Tuimavave
Substitutions:
IC	14	Mark Elia
IC	15	Sam Panapa
IC	16	Apollo Perelini
IC	17	Joe Vagana
Coach:
(New Zealand) Graham Lowe

FB	1	Frédéric Banquet
RW	2	Brian Coles
RC	3	Jean-Marc Garcia
LC	4	Pierre Chamorin
LW	5	Pascal Mons
SO	6	Pascal Fages
SH	7	Patrick Entat (c)
PR	8	Hadji Boudebza
HK	9	Patrick Torreilles
PR	10	Karl Jaavuo
SR	11	Cyril Baudouin
SR	12	Didier Cabestany
LF	13	Thierry Valero
Substitutions:
IC	14	Frédéric Teixido
IC	15	Pascal Jampy
IC	16	Marc Tisseyre
IC	17
Coach:
(France) Ivan Grésèque

== Wales vs Western Samoa ==
With a World Cup Semi-final spot on the line, the largest rugby league attendance in Swansea for 20 years saw Wales defeat the "Samoan Demolition Squad" 22–10.

15 October 1995

Wales	22 – 10	Western Samoa
Tries: Iestyn Harris; Anthony Sullivan; Kevin Ellis; Goals: Jonathan Davies (4); Field Goals: Jonathan Davies (1); Iestyn Harris (1)		Tries: Vila Matautia Goals: John Schuster (3)

Vetch Field, Swansea
Attendance: 15,385
Referee: Russell Smith (England)

Wales	Western Samoa

FB	1	Iestyn Harris
RW	2	Anthony Sullivan
RC	3	Allan Bateman
LC	4	John Devereux
LW	5	Adrian Hadley
SO	6	Jonathan Davies (c)
SH	7	Kevin Ellis
PR	8	Kelvin Skerrett
HK	9	Martin Hall
PR	10	Dai Young
SR	11	Paul Moriarty
SR	12	Scott Quinnell
LK	13	Richard Eyres
Substitutions:
IC	14	Neil Cowie
IC	15	Keiron Cunningham
IC	16	Rowland Phillips
IC	17	Paul Atcheson
Coach:
(Wales) Clive Griffiths

FB	1	Paki Tuimavave
RW	2	John Schuster (c)
RC	3	Tea Ropati
LC	4	Va'aiga Tuigamala
LW	5	Brian Laumatia
FE	6	Sam Panapa
HB	7	Willie Swann
PR	8	Se'e Solomona
HK	9	Willie Poching
PR	10	Fa'ausu Afoa
SR	11	Tony Tatupu
SR	12	Vila Matautia
LK	13	Tony Tuimavave
Substitutions:
IC	14	Mark Elia
IC	15	Des Maea
IC	16	Apollo Perelini
IC	17	Joe Vagana
Coach:
(New Zealand) Graham Lowe
