= Brian Cole =

Brian Cole may refer to:

- Brian Cole (musician) (1942–1972), American musician with The Association
- B. J. Cole (Brian John Cole, born 1946), English pedal steel guitarist
- Brian Cole (footballer) (born 1956), Australian footballer
- Brian J. Cole (born 1962), American orthopedic surgeon and professor
- Brian Lee Cole (born 1967), American bishop
- Brian Cole (politician) (born 1971), American politician, member of the New Hampshire House of Representatives
- Brian Cole (baseball) (1978–2001), American baseball outfielder
- Brian Cole II (born 1997), American football safety

== See also ==
- Brian Coles (born 1964), French rugby league player
