= 1991–92 Regal Trophy =

- Structure: National knockout championship
- Teams: 38
- Winners: Widnes
- Runners-up: Leeds

The 1991–92 Regal Trophy was a British rugby league knockout tournament. It was the 21st season that the competition was held, and was the third staging of the competition since it was re-named the Regal Trophy.

Widnes won the final, beating Leeds by the score of 24–0.

== Background ==
This season saw two "name" changes and one of the three junior clubs being replaced by a new league club. The number of entrants remained the same at thirty-eight.
The changes were :-
1 Runcorn Highfield became Highfield and now played at Hoghton Road Stadium in Sutton, a suburb of St. Helens and home to St Helens Town A.F.C. (although signing a 99-year lease, the club moved on after 4½ years after a proposed rent increase made a stay unviable - Fulham became London Crusaders but were still nomadic, although playing many home matches at Crystal Palace National Sports Centre before settling at Barnet Copthall for season 1993-94
2 Scarborough Pirates joined the league and the competition (albeit for a very brief one season stay before going into administration), taking the place of one of the junior teams-
The preliminary round involved twelve clubs, to reduce the numbers to entrants to the first round proper to thirty-two.

== Competition and results ==
=== Preliminary round ===
Involved 2 matches and 4 Clubs

Game No	Fixture Date	Home team	Score	Away team	Venue	Att	Rec	Notes	Ref
1	Tue 29 Oct 1991	Rochdale Hornets	14–24	Widnes	Spotland	2278			
2	Tue 29 Oct 1991	Wigan	34–14	Dewsbury	Central Park	5020			
3	Thu 31 Oct 1991	Hull F.C.	22–7	Leigh	Boulevard	2219			
4	Sun 3 Nov 1991	Saddleworth	0–30	Workington Town	Watersheddings	1650		1, 2	
5	Sun 3 Nov 1991	Sheffield Eagles	36–8	Scarborough Pirates	Don Valley Stadium	1226			
6	Mon 4 Nov 1991	Leigh East	20–10	Chorley Borough	Hilton Park	1393		3, 4	

=== First Round ===
Involved 16 matches and 32 Clubs

Game No	Fixture Date	Home team	Score	Away team	Venue	Att	Rec	Notes	Ref
1	Sat 16 Nov 1991	Warrington	8–17	Leeds	Wilderspool	4353			
2	Sun 17 Nov 1991	Bradford Northern	76–0	Leigh East	Odsal	1613		3	
3	Sun 17 Nov 1991	Doncaster	21–20	Whitehaven	Bentley Road Stadium/Tattersfield	693			
4	Sun 17 Nov 1991	Halifax	46–4	Barrow	Thrum Hall	4791			
5	Sun 17 Nov 1991	Highfield	10–28	Carlisle	Hoghton Road Stadium	180			
6	Sun 17 Nov 1991	Huddersfield	10–32	St. Helens	Fartown	4239			
7	Sun 17 Nov 1991	Hull Kingston Rovers	10–22	Castleford	Craven Park (2)	3406			
8	Sun 17 Nov 1991	Keighley Cougars	25–10	Hunslet	Cougar Park	1155			
9	Sun 17 Nov 1991	Nottingham City	11–42	Wakefield Trinity	Harvey Hadden Stadium	916			
10	Sun 17 Nov 1991	Oldham	16–10	London Crusaders	Watersheddings	2182			
11	Sun 17 Nov 1991	Ryedale-York	6–13	Sheffield Eagles	Ryedale Stadium	1138			
12	Sun 17 Nov 1991	Salford	74–10	Trafford Borough	The Willows	1783			
13	Sun 17 Nov 1991	Swinton	8–34	Wigan	Station Road	4676			
14	Sun 17 Nov 1991	Widnes	26–8	Workington Town	Naughton Park	4917			
15	Mon 18 Nov 1991	Hull F.C.	12–8	Batley	Boulevard	2149			
16	Tue 19 Nov 1991	Bramley	18–18	Featherstone Rovers	McLaren Field	1643			

==== Replay ====
Involved 1 match and 2 Clubs

Game No	Fixture Date	Home team	Score	Away team	Venue	Att	Rec	Notes	Ref
1	Thu 21 Nov 1991	Featherstone Rovers	44–8	Bramley	Post Office Road	1617			

=== Second Round ===
Involved 8 matches and 16 Clubs

Game No	Fixture Date	Home team	Score	Away team	Venue	Att	Rec	Notes	Ref
1	Sat 23 Nov 1991	Hull F.C.	4–12	Leeds	Boulevard	4359			
2	Sun 24 Nov 1991	Bradford Northern	44–10	Sheffield Eagles	Odsal	3118			
3	Sun 24 Nov 1991	Carlisle	16–30	Widnes	Gifford Park	1874		5	
4	Sun 24 Nov 1991	Featherstone Rovers	64–18	Halifax	Post Office Road	5462			
5	Sun 24 Nov 1991	Oldham	18–24	St. Helens	Watersheddings	5814			
6	Sun 24 Nov 1991	Wakefield Trinity	10–30	Salford	Belle Vue	4577			
7	Sun 24 Nov 1991	Wigan	32–8	Keighley Cougars	Central Park	6052			
8	Mon 25 Nov 1991	Castleford	38–6	Doncaster	Wheldon Road	4145			

=== Third Round ===
Involved 4 matches with 8 clubs

Game No	Fixture Date	Home team	Score	Away team	Venue	Att	Rec	Notes	Ref
1	Sat 30 Nov 1991	Salford	24–14	Wigan	The Willows	4608			
2	Sun 1 Dec 1991	Leeds	24–4	Castleford	Headingley	15409			
3	Sun 1 Dec 1991	St. Helens	30–12	Bradford Northern	Knowsley Road	8641			
4	Sun 1 Dec 1991	Widnes	34–22	Featherstone Rovers	Naughton Park	6551			

=== Semi final ===
Involved 2 matches and 4 Clubs

Game No	Fixture Date	Home team	Score	Away team	Venue	Att	Rec	Notes	Ref
1	Sat 7 Dec 1991	Leeds	22–15	Salford	Valley Parade	7275		6	
2	Sat 21 Dec 1991	Widnes	18–10	St. Helens	Central Park	6376			

=== Final ===
The match was played at Central Park, Wigan. The attendance was 15,070.

11 January 1992

Widnes	24 – 0	Leeds
Tries: Davies, Holliday, Tait, Sorensen; Goals: Davies (3); Drop goals: Davies, Holliday

Central Park, Wigan
Attendance: 15,070
Referee: Brian Galtress (Bradford)
Player of the Match: Les Holliday

==== Teams ====
Widnes	No.	Leeds
	Teams	
Alan Tait	1	Morvin Edwards
John Devereux	2	Phil Ford
Andy Currier	3	David Creasser
Darren Wright	4	Simon Irving
Mark Sarsfield	5	John Bentley
Jonathan Davies (c)	6	Garry Schofield (c)
Barry Dowd	7	Bobbie Goulding
Kurt Sorensen	8	Shaun Wane
Paul Hulme	9	Richard Gunn
David Smith	10	Mike O'Neill
Harvey Howard	11	Roy Powell
Richard Eyres	12	Paul Dixon
Les Holliday	13	Gary Divorty
	Substitutes	
Paul Atcheson (for Sarsfield, 73 min.)	14	Carl Gibson (for Irving, 53 min.)
Joe Grima (for Holliday, 59 min.)	15	Steve Molloy (for Wane, 46 min.)
Frank Myler	Coach	Doug Laughton

=== Prize money ===
As part of the sponsorship deal and funds, the prize money awarded to the competing teams for this season is as follows:

Finish Position	Cash prize	No. receiving prize	Total cash
Winner	£32,000	1	£32,000
Runner-up	£17,000	1	£17,000
Semi-finalist	£9,000	2	£18,000
Loser in Rd 3	£5,500	4	£22,000
Loser in Rd 2	£3,500	8	£28,000
Loser in Rd 1	£2,250	16	£36,000
All clubs in Prelim Round	£2,250	12	£27,000
Total Prize Money			£180,000
Capital Development Fund			£120,000
Grand Total			£300,000

=== The road to success ===
This tree excludes any preliminary round fixtures

First round
Highfield	10
Carlisle	28
Widnes	26
Workington Town	8
Bramley	18 (8)
Featherstone Rovers	18 (44)
Halifax	46
Barrow	4
Oldham	16
London Crusaders	10
Huddersfield	10
St. Helens	32
Bradford Northern	76
Leigh East	0
Ryedale-York	6
Sheffield Eagles	13
Hull F.C.	12
Batley	8
Warrington	8
Leeds	17
Hull Kingston Rovers	10
Castleford	22
Doncaster	21
Whitehaven	20
Nottingham City	11
Wakefield Trinity	42
Salford	74
Trafford Borough	10
Swinton	8
Wigan	34
Keighley Cougars	25
Hunslet

Second round
Carlisle	16
Widnes	30
Featherstone Rovers	64
Halifax	18
Oldham	18
St. Helens	24
Bradford Northern	44
Sheffield Eagles	10
Hull F.C.	4
Leeds	12
Castleford	38
Doncaster	6
Wakefield Trinity	10
Salford	30
Wigan	32
Keighley Cougars	8

Third round
Widnes	34
Featherstone Rovers	22
St. Helens	30
Bradford Northern	12
Leeds	24
Castleford	4
Salford	24
Wigan	14

Semifinals
Widnes	18
St. Helens	10
Leeds	22
Salford	15

Final
Widnes	24
Leeds	0

== See also ==
- 1991-92 Rugby Football League season
- 1991 Lancashire Cup
- 1991 Yorkshire Cup
- Regal Trophy
- Rugby league county cups
