= 1994–95 Regal Trophy =

- Structure: National knockout championship
- Teams: 48
- Winners: Wigan
- Runners-up: Warrington

The 1994–95 Regal Trophy was a British rugby league knockout tournament. This was the 24th season that the competition was held, and was the sixth staging of the competition since it was re-named the Regal Trophy.

Wigan won the final, beating Warrington 40-10 at the McAlpine Stadium in Huddersfield. The attendance was 19,636.

== Background ==
This season saw no changes from last season's re-vamping, with no new members and no withdrawals, and the number remaining at forty-eight.

The entrants still included two French clubs and eleven junior clubs.

The sixteen first round winners added to the sixteen clubs given byes, gave a total of entrants into the second round as 32.

== Competition and results ==
=== Round 1 ===
Round 1 involved 16 matches and 32 clubs.

Game no.	Fixture date	Home team	Score	Away team	Venue	Att	Rec	Notes	Ref
1	Sat 19 Nov 1994	Hunslet	14-18	AS Saint Estève	Elland Road	521		(Note: AS Saint Estève was a French rugby league team from Perpignan, which in 2000 merged with nearby neighbours XIII Catalan to form Union Treiziste Catalaneto compete in the Super Leagueas the Catalans Dragons.)	
2	Sun 20 Nov 1994	Dewsbury	22-4	XIII Catalan	Crown Flatt	1196		(Note: XIII Catalan were a French rugby league team from Perpignan, founded in 1935, founding members of the French rugby league championship. In 2000 they merged with AS Saint Estève to form Union Treiziste Catalane (or Catalans Dragons).)	
3	Thu 24 Nov 1994	Barrow	138-0	Nottingham City	Craven Park	500		(Note: This was the highest score and the highest winning margin, at the time. The record stood for approximately two days before it was beaten. This record includes club records of (1) joint highest try scorer in a match by Steve Rowan with 6 tries, (2) highest number of goals kicked in a match by Darren Carter with 17, and (3) the highest number of points in a match also by Darren Carter with 17 goals and 2 tries, making a total of 42.)	
4	Sat 26 Nov 1994	Huddersfield	142-4	Blackpool Gladiators	Alfred McAlpine Stadium	1111		(Note: This beat the record for the highest score, and equalled the highest margin of victory, set two days earlier. This record included the all time British record of most tries by a centre in a match when Greg Austin scored 9 tries.)	
5	Sun 27 Nov 1994	Batley	38-8	Queens	Mount Pleasant	607		(Note: Queens are a junior (amateur) club from Leeds.)	
6	Sun 27 Nov 1994	Bramley	40-14	Myson (Hull)	McLaren Field	302		(Note: Myson are a junior (amateur) club from Hull.)	
7	Sun 27 Nov 1994	Carlisle	25-12	Bradford Dudley Hill	Gifford Park	206		(Note: Bradford Dudley Hill are a Junior (amateur) club from Bradford.)	
8	Sun 27 Nov 1994	Highfield	12-6	Ovenden (Halifax)	Hoghton Road Stadium	285		(Note: Ovenden are a junior (amateur) club from Halifax)	
9	Sun 27 Nov 1994	Hull Kingston Rovers	48-8	Hensingham	Craven Park (2)	1158		(Note: Hensingham are a junior (amateur) club from Whitehaven.)	
10	Sun 27 Nov 1994	Keighley Cougars	56-0	Chorley Borough (2)	Cougar Park	2370			
11	Sun 27 Nov 1994	Leigh	18-12	Leigh Miners' Welfare	Hilton Park	2561		(Note: Leigh Miners' Welfare are a junior (amateur) club from Leigh (formed by merger of Astley & Tyldesley and Hope Rangers - and now Leigh Miners Rangers).)	
12	Sun 27 Nov 1994	London Crusaders	34-16	Hemel Stags	Barnet Copthall	668		(Note: Hemel Stags are a semiprofessional club based in Hemel Hempstead and playing at the Pennine Way stadium (capacity 2000).)	
13	Sun 27 Nov 1994	Rochdale Hornets	34-10	Woolston Rovers	Spotland	576		(Note: Woolston Rovers are a junior (amateur) club from Warrington, becoming Warrington Woolston Rovers in 2003 and Warrington Wizards in 2002. The ground is the old Warrington Home Ground of Wilderspool.)	
14	Sun 27 Nov 1994	Ryedale-York	26-9	West Hull	Ryedale Stadium	668		(Note: West Hull are a junior (amateur) club from Hull.)	
15	Sun 27 Nov 1994	Swinton	32-26	Saddleworth Rangers	Gigg Lane	380		(Note: Saddleworth Rangers are a junior (amateur) club from Oldham.)	
16	Sun 27 Nov 1994	Whitehaven	66-0	Thatto Heath	Recreation Ground	686		(Note: Thatto Heath are a junior (amateur) club from St Helens.)	

=== Round 2 ===
Round 2 involved 16 matches and 32 clubs. The 16 winners of the first round were joined by the 16 First Division clubs in the second round.

Game no	Fixture date	Home team	Score	Away team	Venue	Att	Rec	Notes	Ref
1	Sat 3 Dec 1994	Carlisle	16-30	Dewsbury	Gifford Park	287			
2	Sat 3 Dec 1994	Castleford	32-26	Halifax	The Jungle	4740			
3	Sun 4 Dec 1994	Highfield	2-50	Widnes	Hoghton Road Stadium	1199			
4	Sun 4 Dec 1994	Huddersfield	11-52	St. Helens	Alfred McAlpine Stadium	5534			
5	Sun 4 Dec 1994	Hull F.C.	26-16	Barrow	Boulevard	2325			
6	Sun 4 Dec 1994	Keighley Cougars	28-4	Bramley	Cougar Park	2515			
7	Sun 4 Dec 1994	Leeds	54-24	Swinton	Headingley	4867			
8	Sun 4 Dec 1994	Oldham	28-0	Hull Kingston Rovers	Watersheddings	2277			
9	Sun 4 Dec 1994	Salford	16-14	London Crusaders	The Willows	2088			
10	Sun 4 Dec 1994	Sheffield Eagles	46-10	Leigh	Don Valley Stadium	870			
11	Sun 4 Dec 1994	Warrington	44-14	Doncaster	Wilderspool	3581			
12	Sun 4 Dec 1994	Whitehaven	18-12	Featherstone Rovers	Recreation Ground	1248			
13	Sun 4 Dec 1994	Wigan	34-12	Rochdale Hornets	Central Park	7493			
14	Sun 4 Dec 1994	Workington Town	24-8	Wakefield Trinity	Derwent Park	2349			
15	Wed 7 Dec 1994	Batley	36-8	Ryedale-York	Mount Pleasant	719			
16	Wed 7 Dec 1994	Bradford Northern	32-6	Saint Estève	Odsal	2250			

=== Round 3 ===
Round 3 involved eight matches and 16 clubs.

Game no.	Fixture date	Home team	Score	Away team	Venue	Att	Rec	Notes	Ref
1	Sat 17 Dec 1994	Salford	24-31	Warrington	The Willows	2189			
2	Sun 18 Dec 1994	Batley	22-22	St. Helens	Mount Pleasant	3017			
3	Sun 18 Dec 1994	Hull F.C.	14-38	Wigan	Boulevard	6203			
4	Sun 18 Dec 1994	Keighley Cougars	26-10	Sheffield Eagles	Cougar Park	3914			
5	Sun 18 Dec 1994	Whitehaven	14-34	Bradford Northern	Recreation Ground	1962			
6	Sun 18 Dec 1994	Widnes	20-6	Oldham	Naughton Park	3517			
7	Sun 18 Dec 1994	Workington Town	14-18	Leeds	Derwent Park	3648			
8	Tue 20 Dec 1994	Dewsbury	2-30	Castleford	Crown Flatt	3325			

=== Round 3 – third round replays ===
Round 3 's replays involved one match and two clubs.

Game no.	Fixture date	Home team	Score	Away team	Venue	Att	Rec	Notes	Ref
1	Tue 20 Dec 1994	St. Helens	50-22	Batley	Knowsley Road	4940			

=== Round 4 – quarterfinals ===
Round 4's quarterfinals involved four matches and eight clubs.

Game no.	Fixture date	Home team	Score	Away team	Venue	Att	Rec	Notes	Ref
1	Sat 7 Jan 1995	Leeds	14-34	Castleford	Headingley	10650			
2	Sun 8 Jan 1995	Keighley Cougars	18-20	Warrington	Cougar Park	5685			
3	Sun 8 Jan 1995	Widnes	23-10	Bradford Northern	Naughton Park	4807		(Note: RUGBYLEAGUEproject gives the attendance as 4,807 but Widnes official archives gives it as 4,831.)	
4	Sun 8 Jan 1995	Wigan	24-22	St. Helens	Central Park	23278			

=== Round 5 – semifinals ===
Round 5's semifinals involved two matches and four clubs.

Game no.	Fixture date	Home team	Score	Away team	Venue	Att	Rec	Notes	Ref
1	Sat 14 Jan 1995	Widnes	4-30	Warrington	Naughton Park	6181			
2	Sun 15 Jan 1995	Wigan	34-6	Castleford	Central Park	13006			

=== Final ===
28 January 1995

Wigan	40 – 10	Warrington
Tries: Tuigamala (2), Botica, Connolly, McDermott, Offiah; Goals: Botica (8)		Tries: Forster (2); Goals: Davies

Alfred McAlpine Stadium, Huddersfield (Note: The McAlpine Stadium is the home ground of Huddersfield Town and Super League side, Huddersfield Giants. The stadium is 40% owned by Kirklees Metropolitan Council and 60% by the two clubs. It hosted its first match in August 1994 and seats 24,499 people along with hospitality boxes and conference rooms. Since opening the stadium has been sponsored as the John Smith's Stadium, originally the Alfred McAlpine Stadium and more lately the Galpharm Stadium. It is a multi-use sports stadium in Huddersfield in West Yorkshire, England.)
Attendance: 19,636
Referee: Stuart Cummings (Widnes)
Player of the Match: Phil Clarke

==== Teams and scorers ====
Wigan	№	Warrington
	Teams	
Henry Paul	1	Jonathan Davies
Jason Robinson	2	Mark Forster
Va'aiga Tuigamala	3	Allan Bateman
Gary Connolly	4	Iestyn Harris
Martin Offiah	5	Rob Myler
Frano Botica	6	Francis Maloney
Shaun Edwards	7	Greg Mackey
Kelvin Skerrett	8	Gary Tees
Martin Hall	9	Tukere Barlow
Neil Cowie	10	Bruce McGuire
Denis Betts	11	Paul Cullen
Mick Cassidy	12	Paul Darbyshire
Phil Clarke	13	Kelly Shelford
Paul Atcheson (for Va'aiga Tuigamala 56-mins)	14	Andy Bennett (for Tukere Barlow 66-mins)
Barrie McDermott (for Neil Cowie half-time)	15	Gary Sanderson (for Paul Darbyshire 18-mins)
Graeme West	Coach	Reg Bowden

=== Prize money ===
As part of the sponsorship deal and funds, the prize money awarded to the competing teams for this season was as follows:

Finish position	Cash prize	No. receiving prize	Total cash
Winner	£36,000	1	£36,000
Runner-up	£19,000	1	£19,000
Semifinalist	£10,250	2	£20,500
Quarterfinalist	£6,500	4	£26,000
Third round losers	£4,200	8	£33,600
Second round losers	£2,700	16	£43,200
First round (RFL clubs and French clubs)	£2,700	21	£56,700
First round (amateur clubs)	£1,000	11	£11,000
Total prize money			£246,000
Development fund			£164,000
Grand total			£410,000

=== The road to success ===
This tree excludes the first round fixtures.

Second round
Hull F.C.	26
Barrow	16
Wigan	34
Rochdale Hornets	12
Batley	36
Ryedale-York	8
Huddersfield	11
St. Helens	52
Workington Town	24
Wakefield Trinity	8
Leeds	54
Swinton	24
Carlisle	16
Dewsbury	30
Castleford	36
Halifax	26
Highfield	2
Widnes	50
Oldham	28
Hull Kingston Rovers	0
Whitehaven	18
Featherstone Rovers	12
Bradford Northern	32
Saint Estève	6
Keighley Cougars	28
Bramley	4
Sheffield Eagles	46
Leigh	10
Salford	16
London Crusaders	14
Warrington	44
Doncaster	14

Third round
Hull F.C.	14
Wigan	38
Batley	22 (22)
St. Helens	22 (50)
Workington Town	14
Leeds	18
Dewsbury	2
Castleford	30
Widnes	20
Oldham	6
Whitehaven	14
Bradford Northern	34
Keighley Cougars	26
Sheffield Eagles	10
Salford	24
Warrington	31

Fourth round
Wigan	24
St. Helens	22
Leeds	14
Castleford	34
Widnes	23
Bradford Northern	10
Keighley Cougars	18
Warrington	20

Semifinals
Wigan	34
Castleford	6
Widnes	4
Warrington	30

Final
Wigan	40
Warrington	10

== See also ==
- 1994-95 Rugby Football League season
- Regal Trophy

== Sources ==
- Fletcher, Raymond; Howes, David, eds. (1995). Rothmans Rugby League Yearbook 1995-96. London: Headline Publishing Group. ISBN 978-0-7472-7817-7.
