= 1996 Rugby League Divisional Premiership =

1996 Divisional Premiership Trophy
- Structure: National knockout championship
- Teams: 4
- Winners: Salford Reds
- Runners-up: Keighley Cougars

The 1996 Rugby League Divisional Premiership was the 10th end-of-season Rugby League Divisional Premiership competition and the first in the Super League era.

The competition was contested by only four teams for the 1996 season; the top three teams in Division One, and the winners of Division Two. The winners were Salford Reds.

== Semi-finals ==
Date	Team one	Score	Team two
1 September 1996	Keighley Cougars	41–28	Hull
1 September 1996	Salford Reds	36–16	Hull Kingston Rovers

== Final ==
8 September 1996

Salford Reds	19 – 6	Keighley Cougars
Tries: Naylor (2), Blakeley; Goals: Blakeley (3); Drop goals: Blakeley	Report	Tries: Cantillon; Goals: Irving

Old Trafford, Manchester
Referee: Stuart Cummings (Widnes)
Player of the Match: Cliff Eccles

1	Steve Hampson
2	Fata Sini
3	Scott Naylor
4	Nathan McAvoy
5	Darren Rogers
6	Steve Blakeley (c)
7	Mark Lee
8	Ian Blease
9	Peter Edwards
10	Cliff Eccles
11	Paul Forber
12	Lokeni Savelio
13	Sam Panapa
Substitutions:
14	Ian Watson
15	Scott Martin
16	Andy Burgess
17	Craig Randall
Coach:
Andy Gregory

1	Keith Dixon
2	Simon Wray
3	Mark Milner
4	Simon Irving
5	Jason Critchley
6	Daryl Powell (c)
7	Chris Robinson
8	Steve Parsons
9	Phil Cantillon
10	Steve Hall
11	Darren Fleary
12	Sonny Whakarau
13	Martin Wood
Substitutions:
14	Latham Tawhai
15	Grant Doorey
16	Jason Ramshaw
17	David Larder
Coach:
Phil Larder

== See also ==
- 1996 RFL Division One
- 1996 RFL Division Two
