= Mathieu Khedimi =

France international rugby league and union footballer (1964–2023)

Personal information
- Born: 19 February 1964; Mediouna, Algeria
- Died: 31 December 2023 (aged 59); Saint-Estève, France

Playing information

Rugby union
Club
Years	Team	Pld	T	G	FG	P
????–82	USA Perpignan

Rugby league
- Position: Hooker
Club
Years	Team	Pld	T	G	FG	P
1982–97	AS Saint-Estève
Representative
Years	Team	Pld	T	G	FG	P
1987–94	France	9	1	0	0	4

Coaching information
Representative
Years	Team	Gms	W	D	L	W%
1997–??	AS Saint-Estève
- Source: As of 29 January 2021
- Relatives: Matthieu Khedimi (son)

Mathieu Khedimi (19 February 1964 – 31 December 2023) was a French rugby league coach and player. He played as hooker or lock forward. He played his entire career for AS Saint-Estève with which he won several titles. An author of the rugby league literature considered him as "long the soul of the club".

== Biography ==
Khedimi was trained in rugby union in the ranks of USA Perpignan, reaching the Reichel Championship semi-final in 1982, under the guidance of the coach Louis Cros.

In rugby league, he was part of the great Saint-Estève team, collecting the titles of the French Championship and Lord Derby Cup in the 1980s and the 1990s.

== Career ==
Finally, he earned 9 caps for France between 1987 and 1994, taking part at the 1985-1988, 1989-1992 and 1995 World Cups. He was also the coach of AS Saint-Estève in 1998, with a French Championship and Lord Derby Cup title. Before his death, Khedimi was the French Rugby League Federation vice-president, along with Marc Palanques.

== Personal life ==
Mathieu Khedimi was father of the rugby league players Matthieu Khedimi and Romain Khedimi, the former being a French international.

In his civil life, he owned an earthworks company, after being a municipal police officer.

Khedimi died on 31 December 2023, at the age of 59.

== Honours ==
=== Player ===
- Team Honours :
  - Winner of the French Championship : 1989, 1990, 1993 and 1997 (Saint-Estève).
  - Winner of the Lord Derby Cup : 1987, 1993, 1994 and 1995 (Saint-Estève).
  - Runner-up at the French Championship : 1992, 1995 and 1996 (Saint-Estève).
  - Runner-up at the Lord Derby Cup :1988 and 1990 (Saint-Estève).

=== Coach ===
- Team honours :
  - Winner of the French Championship : 1998 (Saint-Estève).
  - Winner of the Lord Derby Cup : 1998 (Saint-Estève).
