= St Helens Greyhound Racing and Sports Stadium =

English greyhound racing venue

- Interactive map of St Helens Greyhound Racing and Sports Stadium
- Location: Park Road, Parr, St Helens, Lancashire
- Coordinates: 53°27′28″N 2°42′51″W

Construction
- Opened: football (1901) greyhound racing (1932)
- Closed: 1993

St Helens Greyhound Racing and Sports Stadium was a greyhound racing and former football stadium off Park Road in Parr, St Helens, Lancashire.

== Origins ==
A football ground known as the Primrose Ground was constructed for the St Helens Town Football Club in 1901. It was located on the east side of the Star Inn Race Ground and on the north side of Park Road and south of the St Helens Canal and the London and North Eastern Railway St. Helens branch.

== Football ==
The football team played at the ground from 1901 to 1929.

== Greyhound racing ==
The stadium underwent major renovation in 1932 to accommodate a greyhound track. The first meeting held at the Park Road stadium was on 5 November 1932. The racing was independent (not affiliated to the sports governing body the National Greyhound Racing Club).

In the 1960s the track circumference was 410 yards and was owned by the St Helens Greyhound Racing and Sports Stadium Ltd. Race days were Tuesday and Friday evenings at 7.45pm with an 'Inside hare' system and photo finish installed. The main race distance was 487 yards and facilities included two refreshment bars and a licensed bar.

During the 1980s additional race distances of 275, 493 and 680 yards had been introduced. The main races were the St Helens Derby and the majority of races were handicap races. Facilities had improved with a computerised totalisator, renovated kennels, a glass fronted stand and parking for 200 vehicles.

== Closure ==
The stadium closed on 5 Mar 1993 and the site today is Broadoak Manor nursing home. Within days of the last greyhound meeting the stadium was burned down. Within four months a new operation had started at the Hoghton Road Stadium.
