= Matthieu Khedimi =

France international rugby league footballer

Matthieu Khedemi
Personal information
- Born: 15 January 1997 (age 29) France
- Height: 5 ft 8 in (1.73 m)
- Weight: 13 st 10 lb (87 kg)

Playing information
- Position: Hooker
Club
Years	Team	Pld	T	G	FG	P
2016–18	Saint-Esteve XIII Catalan	33	11	0	0	44
2017–18	Catalans Dragons	1	0	0	0	0
2018–	AS Carcassonne	41	10	0	0	40
	Total	75	21	0	0	84
Representative
Years	Team	Pld	T	G	FG	P
2019–	France	1	0	0	0	0
- Source: As of 29 June 2019
- Father: Mathieu Khedimi

Matthieu Khedemi (born 15 January 1997) is a professional rugby league footballer who plays as a hooker for FC Lezignan in the Super XIII. He previously played for AS Carcassonne and France at international level.

He is the son of Mathieu Khedimi, former rugby league international for France.

In 2017 he made his Catalans debut in the Challenge Cup against Hull FC.
