= Ninian Park =

Stadium in Cardiff, Wales

- The Bearpit
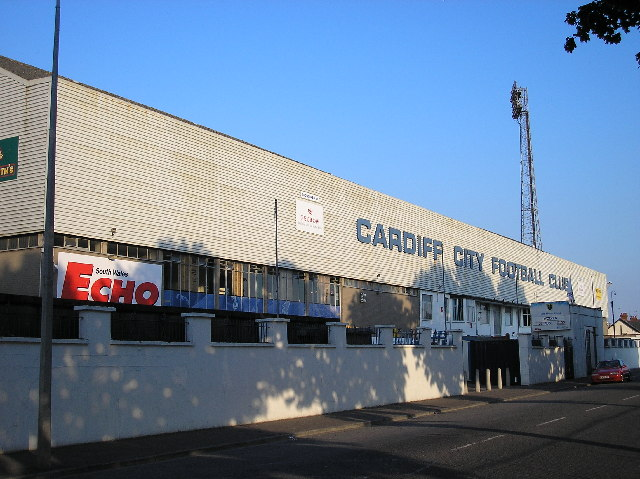
- Ninian Park in 2005

- Location of Ninian Park
- Full name: Ninian Park
- Former names: Sloper Park
- Location: Sloper Road, Cardiff CF11 8SX
- Coordinates: 51°28′29″N 3°12′00″W
- Owner: Cardiff City
- Capacity: 21,508
- Surface: Grass
- Record attendance: 62,634 (Wales vs England, 17 October 1959)
- Field size: 110 x 75 yards

Construction
- Groundbreaking: 1909
- Built: 1910
- Opened: 1 September 1910
- Closed: 2009
- Demolished: 2009
- Main contractor: Cardiff Corporation

Tenants
- Cardiff City (1910–2009); Cardiff City Blue Dragons (1981–1984); Wales national football team (1911–1989)

Ninian Park was a football stadium in the Leckwith area of Cardiff, Wales, that was the home of Cardiff City for 99 years. Opened in 1910 with a single wooden stand, it underwent numerous renovations during its lifespan and hosted fixtures with over 60,000 spectators in attendance. At the time of its closure in 2009, it had a capacity of 21,508.

Cardiff City had originally been playing home fixtures at Sophia Gardens but the lack of facilities at the ground had prevented them from joining the Southern Football League. To combat this, club founder Bartley Wilson secured a plot of land from Cardiff Corporation that had previously been used as a rubbish tip and construction of a new ground began in 1909. The stadium was completed a year later and named Ninian Park after Lieutenant-Colonel Lord Ninian Crichton-Stuart, who had acted as a financial guarantor for the build. A friendly match against Football League First Division champions Aston Villa was organised to open the ground. It was originally constructed with a single wooden stand and three large banks made of ash, but gradual improvements saw stands constructed on all sides of the pitch. The four stands were named the Canton Stand, the Grange End, the Popular Bank and the Grandstand.

The ground was also used as one of the home venues for the Wales national football team from 1911 until the late 1980s, hosting 84 international fixtures during its existence. Safety concerns led to the ground's capacity being drastically reduced and Cardiff Arms Park replacing the stadium as the preferred home venue for the national side. The Welsh national side holds the record attendance for a match at Ninian Park; 62,634 fans watched a fixture against England on 17 October 1959. Cardiff City's club record attendance of 57,893 came at the stadium during a Football League fixture against Arsenal on 22 April 1953. The ground hosted its last match on 25 April 2009 against Ipswich Town and was demolished soon after, being replaced by the adjacent newly constructed Cardiff City Stadium. The site was converted into a residential housing estate which was completed in 2010.

== History ==
=== Construction and early years ===
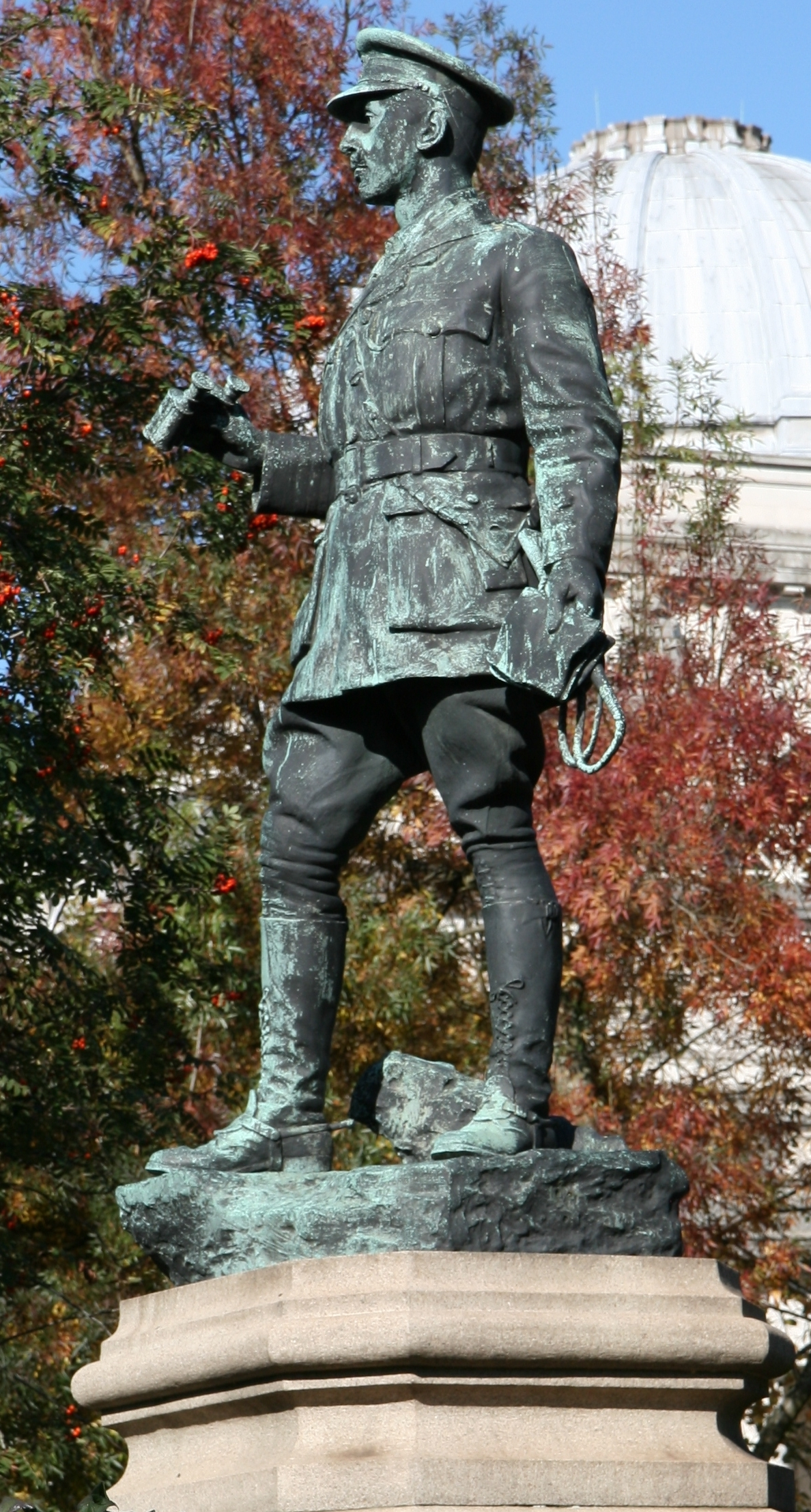
A statue of Lord Ninian after whom Ninian Park is named, in Cathays Park, Cardiff

Following the founding of the club in 1899, Cardiff City (originally named Riverside A.F.C.) played their home matches at Sophia Gardens. The club was becoming increasingly popular with local people, but the facilities at Sophia Gardens were deemed inadequate for this growing support due to the lack of turnstiles or an enclosed pitch. The limitations meant the club was forced to turn down an invitation to join the newly formed Southern Football League Second Division in 1908. To capitalise on growing interest, Cardiff organised friendly matches against Crystal Palace, Bristol City and Middlesbrough that were held at Cardiff Arms Park and the Harlequins Ground, part of Cardiff High School. The attendances convinced club founder Bartley Wilson of the potential success of a professional football club in Cardiff, and he approached the Bute Estate, a large landholder within the city, about securing a plot of land to build a new ground at Leckwith Common.

The club was instead offered an area of waste ground by Councillor John Mander which was known as Tanyard Lane with the incentive that Cardiff Corporation would assist in the construction of the ground. Located between Sloper Road and a local railway station, the area had been used previously as a rubbish tip and an allotment ground. The club chose an area of around five acres near a junction on Leckwith Road. They were offered the ground on an initial seven-year lease with a yearly rent of £90. This was to be supported by guarantors should the club have financial difficulties and be unable to maintain payments. Local volunteers and workers were used to clear the site of debris and level the surface. The ground was surrounded by large mounds of ash and slag sourced from the furnaces of local companies and used to form banking for spectators. A white fence was erected around the outside of the ground. A small 200-seat wooden stand and changing rooms were added to complete the build.

To secure the site, the club was required to provide two or more guarantors to back the deal. One of the guarantors who had initially agreed to support the project later pulled out during development. This led the club's solicitor, Norman Robertson, to address a local council meeting, stating that "there had been difficulties in obtaining promises of support" due to the uncertain state of the coal industry. Lieutenant-Colonel Lord Ninian Crichton-Stuart, son of John Patrick Crichton-Stuart, 3rd Marquess of Bute, stepped in to offer his financial support. In appreciation of his contribution, the ground was subsequently named Ninian Park, replacing the original planned name Sloper Park. The other four guarantors for the site were David Alfred Thomas, 1st Viscount Rhondda, J. Bell Harrison and local councillors Charles Wall and H.C. Vivian. A further 24 people offered to become sureties if their contribution would be limited to £5.

Harry Bradshaw, secretary of the Southern Football League, inspected the ground ahead of the 1910–11 season. He declared that Ninian Park had "the making of the finest football ground in the country" and allowed Cardiff City to join the Southern League's Second Division. Cardiff held two trial matches at the ground, the club's professional players competing against its amateur players in preparation for the opening match. The new ground was officially opened at 5:00 pm on 1 September 1910 with a friendly against Aston Villa, reigning champions of the Football League First Division, that attracted a crowd of around 7,000 people. The match began with a ceremonial kick-off performed by Lord Ninian and ended in a 2–1 defeat for Cardiff. Jack Evans became the first player to score for the club at the ground. The first competitive match played at Ninian Park was the opening match of the 1910–11 season, which took place three weeks later on 24 September 1910. The match ended in a 4–1 victory for Cardiff over Ton Pentre and attracted a crowd of around 8,000. In November, a larger timber stand that could hold up to 3,000 spectators was built at the Canton end of the ground. Several players who worked as labourers in their spare time helped to complete construction. The stand was extended three years later to cover the length of the pitch.

Less than a year after it opened, Ninian Park was chosen as the new home ground for the Wales national football team, replacing Cardiff Arms Park. It hosted its first international fixture on 6 March 1911, a 2–2 draw against Scotland in front of 17,000 spectators in the 1910–11 British Home Championship. The Times described the ground as "primitive" and reported that it had contributed to the poor standard of play. During its formative years, the pitch sometimes bore signs of its former use as a rubbish tip with debris such as glass often rising to the surface. The club paid players 6d an hour to arrive early before matches and help clear the pitch of objects. This approach was not always successful; Scottish international Peter McWilliam suffered a gash to his leg in the first international fixture that ended his playing career, and Wales' Billy Meredith also suffered a cut knee during the match. Cardiff's Jack Evans was scarred for life in a similar incident in a later match when a piece of glass cut his knee. In the early years at the stadium, the ground contained only one changing room and washing area, meaning home and away teams shared facilities. This continued until a separate dressing room was constructed in 1913. A local primary school, originally named Virgil Street Board School, adopted the name of the ground in 1911, becoming Ninian Park Primary School.

=== Football League and development ===
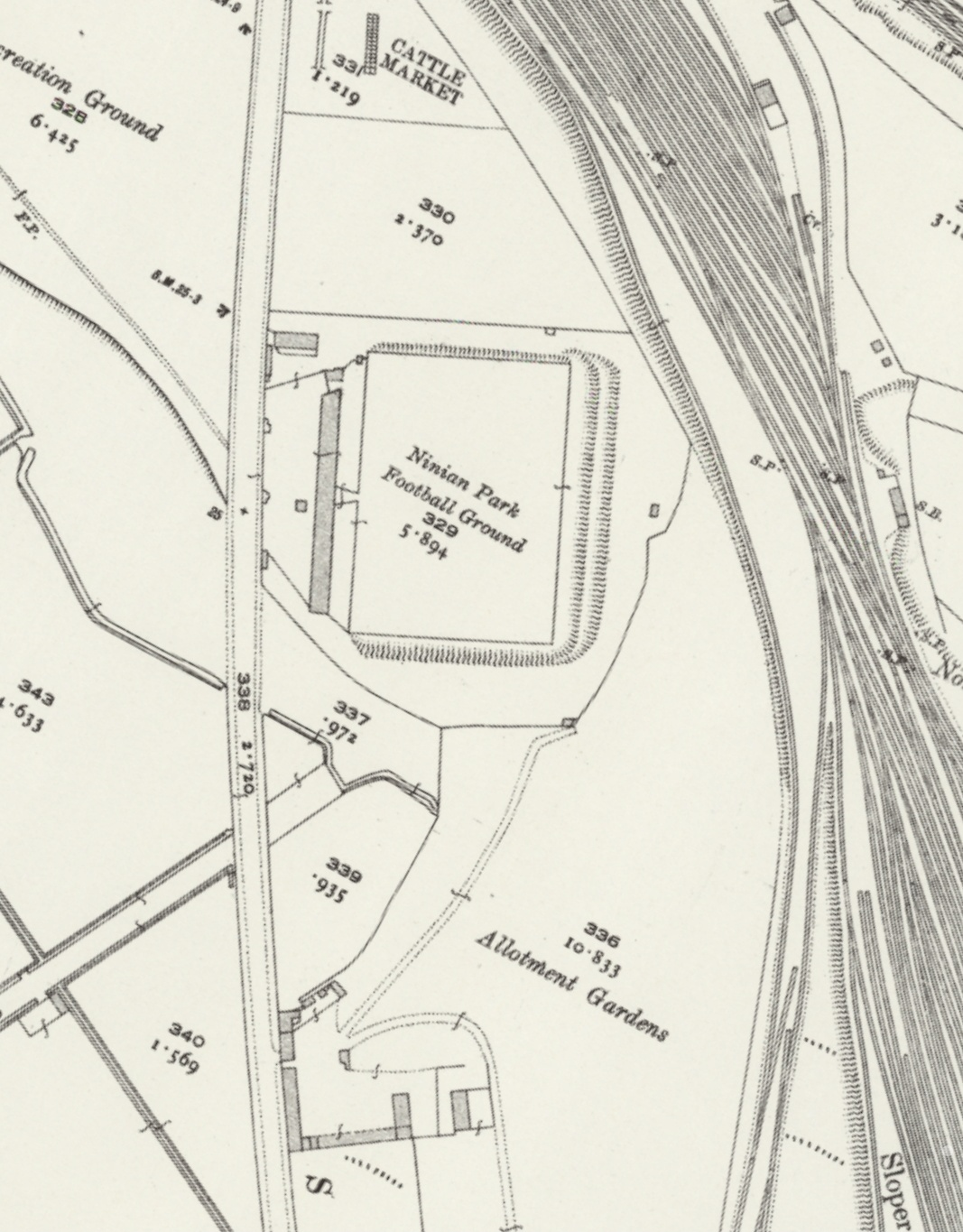
Ninian Park featured on an Ordnance Survey map in 1920

Cardiff won promotion from the Second Division of the Southern Football League to the First Division in 1912–13. Following the resumption of league football after the First World War, the team's fourth-placed finish in the 1919–20 season raised enough income to eliminate the club's debts. This also allowed for the construction of an all-seater stand at Ninian Park behind the north goal which was named the Canton Stand. In 1920, Cardiff was elected to the Second Division of The Football League, helping attendances increase significantly. Matches against well known clubs in the top two divisions of the English football league system attracted considerable interest, with attendances averaging over 28,000 in the Second Division. Further improvements were implemented after this first season in The Football League; a roof was erected over the new Canton Stand, the spectator banks were raised and the pitch was relaid with sea-washed turf, a fine variety of grass grown on the coast that is cleansed by tidal flow. The club stated that the new playing surface was "now equal to the best in the country." Attendances rose again as Cardiff won promotion to the First Division after one season. The opening match of the 1921–22 season attracted a crowd of over 55,000 for a 1–0 defeat by Tottenham Hotspur. The turnstiles were closed once 50,000 spectators had been let into the ground, but the remaining crowds outside, still queuing for entry, forced open the exit gates and entered the ground. Club estimates put the attendance at between 56,000 and 60,000, with spectators even climbing the scoreboard to gain a vantage point.

In 1923, plans were initiated to build new dressing rooms and offices at the ground but the project proved too costly. This was partly due to the expense of replacing the sea-washed turf, which had proved troublesome and had been described as "treacherous" in the two years since it had been installed. The pitch at the ground would prove problematic for several seasons and the club eventually enlisted the help of seed specialists Suttons to improve the quality of the surface. Victory in the 1927 FA Cup Final raised enough funds for a roof to be erected over the terrace at the Grangetown end of the ground. Built by local company Connies & Meaden Limited, it was officially opened on 1 September 1928 before a league match against Burnley by the Lord Mayor of Cardiff, Arthur John Howell. It could hold 18,000 spectators. The investment in the stadium proved detrimental to the team as manager Fred Stewart was left with little money to reinvest in an ageing squad. Replacements were sourced from amateur clubs, but the side was relegated to the Football League Third Division South by 1932. With the club's finances dwindling, the board was keen to add new revenue streams. Boxing matches were soon held at Ninian Park with the first professional event in August 1931 featuring former British light-heavyweight champion Frank Moody. The 1932 Cardiff Sports Carnival was also based at the ground, which included the final of the 12-mile road race finishing with three laps around the stands. The idea of installing a greyhound track at the stadium was also proposed the same year but was met with opposition from council and footballing authorities before being abandoned.

On 18 January 1937, the main stand caught fire after thieves attempted to break into the club's safe using explosives. They mistakenly believed that money taken from gate receipts in an FA Cup tie against Grimsby Town was stored inside. The match had attracted a season-high attendance of more than 36,000 spectators leading to higher than usual income. The fire was discovered at 3:45 am by a local policeman. He alerted the fire brigade but they were unable to douse the fire before it destroyed the stand, the dressing rooms and offices. It also claimed the lives of the club's watchdog Jack as well as one of the club's cats and destroyed the majority of its historical records. The stand was largely destroyed in the blaze but was rebuilt using a brick and stone construction before the outbreak of World War II. Prior to the return of The Football League after the war, Ninian Park hosted its first European opposition when Dynamo Moscow played Cardiff as part of a tour of the United Kingdom in 1945. Cardiff, chosen for being deemed the leading club in Wales, suffered a heavy 10–1 defeat to the visiting side but did earn a substantial profit from ticket sales.

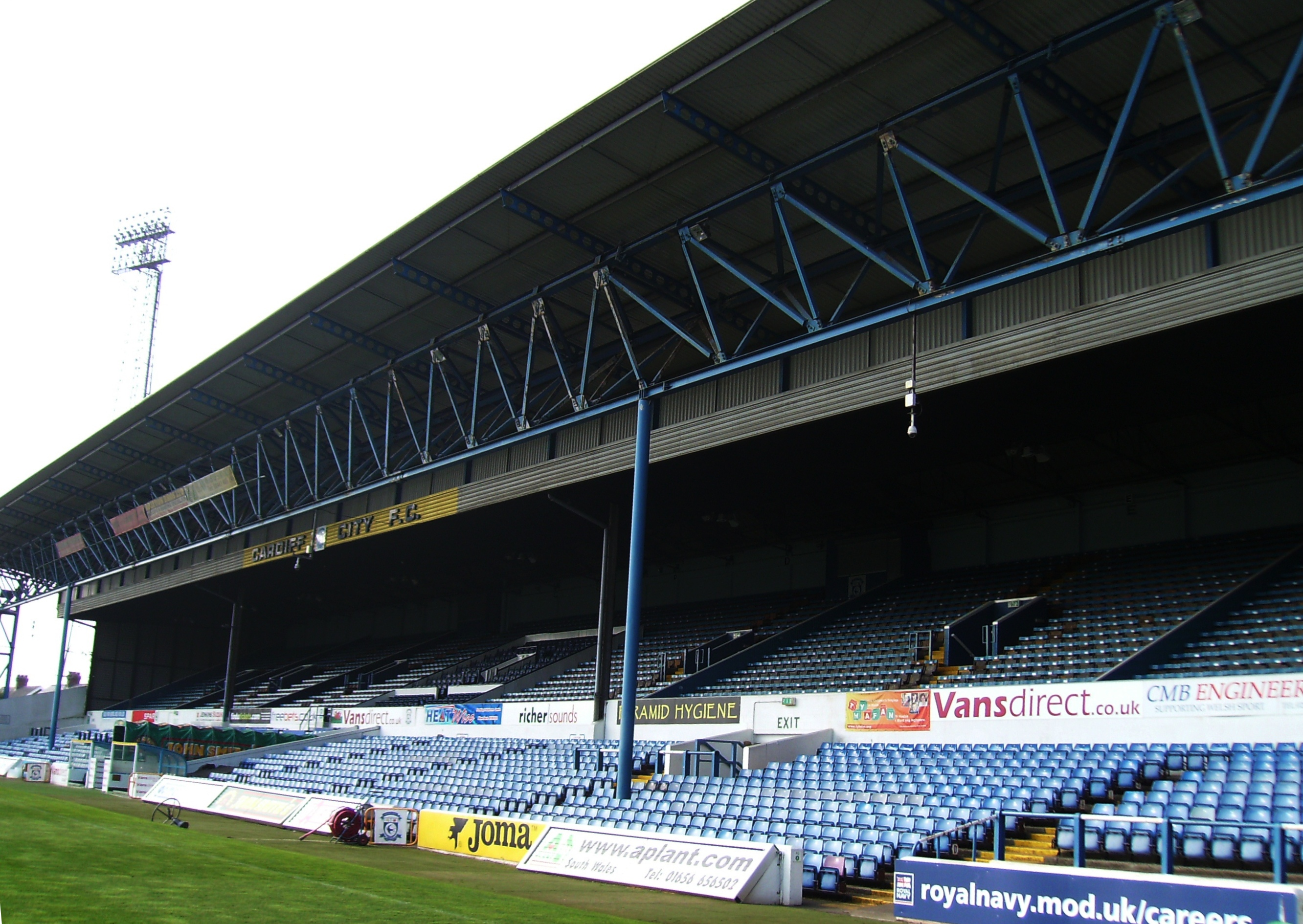
The Grandstand, seen in 2009

Over the following few decades, several areas of the ground underwent significant renovations. The main stand was extended in 1947 at a cost of £9,000, with a new concrete terrace being added in front of the original seating area. Floodlights were added to the ground for the first time in 1960. Ninian Park was one of the last Football League grounds to have them installed. During this period the club's popularity had increased as they challenged for a return to the First Division. On 27 August 1949, Cardiff sold 60,855 tickets for a South Wales derby match against Swansea Town but only 57,510 entered the ground on the day. Their record attendance for a match was set four years later, on 22 April 1953, when a crowd of 57,893 watched a First Division match against Arsenal.

In February 1958, the ground was host to the second leg of the 1958 FIFA World Cup play-off qualifying match between Wales and Israel. Already leading 2–0 from the first leg, Wales secured a second victory by the same scoreline to reach the World Cup finals for the only time in the team's history. Later that year, Connies & Meaden were employed again to construct a large roof over the rear section of the Popular Bank and to extend the stand the length of the pitch. In the early 1960s, qualification for the UEFA Cup Winners' Cup by virtue of winning the Welsh Cup was introduced and Cardiff entered European competition for the first time in the 1964–65 season. The side were drawn against Danish semi-professional team Esbjerg and the first European tie held at Ninian Park took place on 13 October for the second leg of the fixture. After a goalless draw in the first leg, Peter King scored the only goal of the tie to secure a 1–0 aggregate victory for Cardiff in front of a crowd of around 9,000. The low crowd was blamed on the relatively unknown status of the opposition; the club's match against Portuguese side Sporting CP, reigning champions of the competition, in the following round attracted over 23,000 spectators, the biggest home crowd the club had played in front of for nearly two years. This was bettered again in the following round when 38,458 supporters attended a 1–0 defeat against Spanish side Real Zaragoza.

As the club's fortunes declined during the 1960s, crowd numbers fell, but during the 1972–73 season Cardiff spent £225,000 extending the main stand capacity by a further 4,500 seats under the stewardship of new chairman David Goldstone. In 1975, the Safety of Sports Grounds Act was introduced, and two years later local authorities introduced sanctions on Ninian Park that saw the capacity reduced from 46,000 to just 10,000 over safety concerns. The club was forced to pay £600,000 towards improving the ground's safety features to ensure that Ninian Park could be maintained and awarded the necessary safety certificate. A sum of £200,000 was provided by the Football Grounds Improvement Trust and £27,000 by the Football Association of Wales (FAW). The Safety Act also required that the Grange End Stand be overhauled. This included the demolition of the roof, and the removal of banking that severely reduced the overall capacity of the ground. Director Tony Clemo later complained that the restrictions were unduly harsh, stating "There was no common sense [...] the Grangetown Stand had to be demolished in 1978 when the council's safety officers said that if there was two feet of snow and an 80 mile an hour wind blowing, it would be unsafe. We maintained that if there were two feet of snow and an 80 mile and hour wind, we wouldn't be playing football anyway! They insisted and down it came! It was a total waste of time and money." The club did benefit from a relationship with engineering firm Kenton Utilities who undertook most of the work at a reduced rate due to the firm being owned by another Cardiff director, Bob Grogan.

During a qualifying match between Wales and Scotland for the 1986 FIFA World Cup on 10 September 1985, Scotland manager Jock Stein collapsed at the ground after suffering a heart-attack during the final minutes of the match. He was taken to the ground's medical room where he received treatment, but doctors were unable to revive him. In memory of Stein, a plaque was installed in one of the dugouts at the ground.

=== Downscaling, closure and demolition ===
In the late 1980s, increasing concerns over safety issues saw Ninian Park replaced as the main home venue of the Wales national side by Cardiff Arms Park. A few matches were played there until it hosted its final international fixture, a UEFA Euro 2000 qualifying match on 14 October 1998 against Belarus. In January 1990, the club was dealt a blow when thieves broke into the stadium following an FA Cup tie against Queens Park Rangers. They stole £50,000 of gate receipts by gaining access to offices via the pitch. The money was eventually recovered. Some was found in the house of one of the perpetrators; the majority was found buried on Caerphilly Mountain. Later the same year, the FAW chose to move a UEFA Euro 1992 qualifying match between Wales and Belgium to Cardiff Arms Park over fears that proposed safety improvements at Ninian Park would not be completed in time. FAW secretary Alun Evans alluded to the fact that matches between Belgium and the Home Nations were still deemed to be "sensitive" following the Heysel Stadium disaster in 1985. Cardiff threatened legal action over the decision, stating that the club could "meet any deadline" to complete the work, but were unsuccessful. The game went ahead at Cardiff Arms Park.

With Cardiff struggling financially and owing several payments to their landlords, the City of Cardiff Council, the club was forced to close three stands in the ground to save on policing costs during matches. The closure remained in place for a year until Rick Wright acquired control of the club and invested heavily in updating the ground. Improvements included installing 2,100 seats and extending the roof in the Grandstand, replacing terracing in the Popular Bank with 5,330 seats and refurbishing the Grange End and the Canton Stand, which added a further 1,761 seats. Wright decided to sell his stake in the club in 1993 and a feasibility study of Ninian Park carried out by Tarmac Group on behalf of a prospective buyer estimated that the redevelopment of the ground would cost an estimated £4.6 million. The increasingly dilapidated nature of the ground gained national attention following Cardiff's victory over Leeds United in the FA Cup in January 2002 due to crowd trouble after the match. Jeff Cooksley, Chief Superintendent of South Wales Police, commented that, although no objection was made to using the ground, Ninian Park was a "very old ground, [...] and is very poorly designed compared with modern standards."

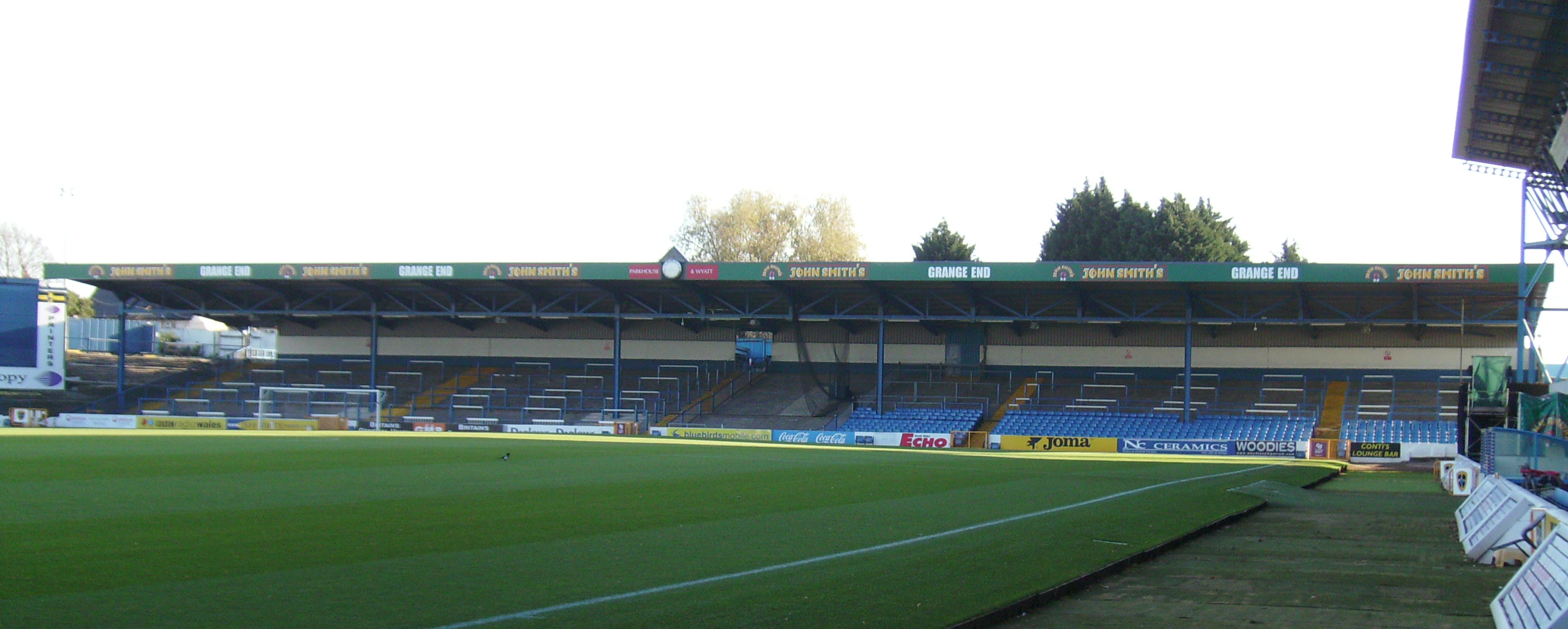
The Grange End, taken in 2007

Plans for a new stadium to replace Ninian Park were in development for several years before Cardiff City officially submitted an application to local councils. Welsh Rugby Union chief executive David Moffett originally objected to the proposals as he wished for the club to use the Millennium Stadium as their home ground instead to maximise the occupancy levels of the stadium. The plans for a 30,000-seat stadium, with the potential to expand to 60,000, were eventually approved by Cardiff council, and plans were submitted in 2006. Work started on the new Cardiff City Stadium at the end of 2007 on the site of the Cardiff Athletics Stadium at an expected cost of £38 million.

Demolition of Ninian Park stadium and
construction of Ninian Park housing

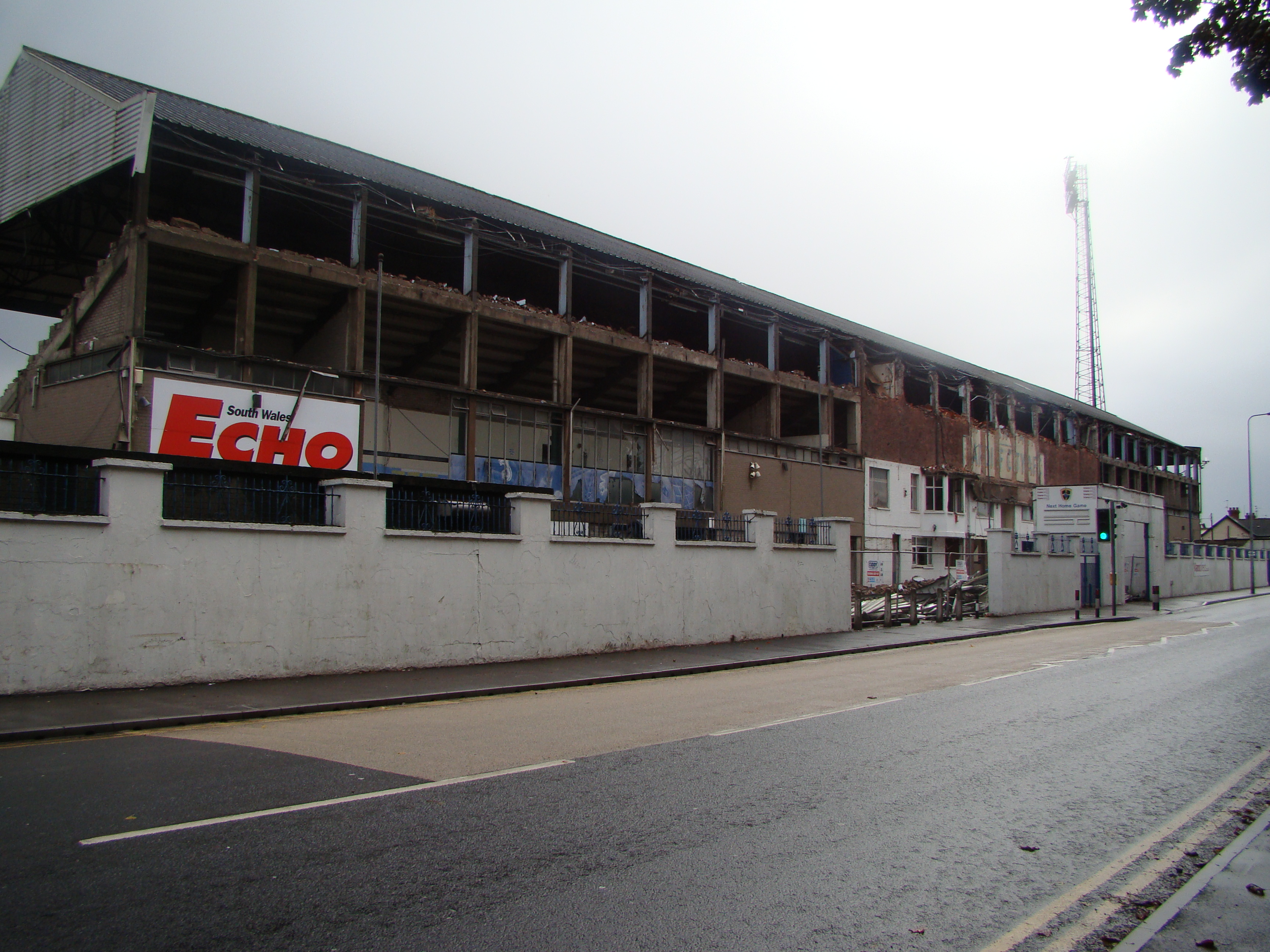
The Grandstand

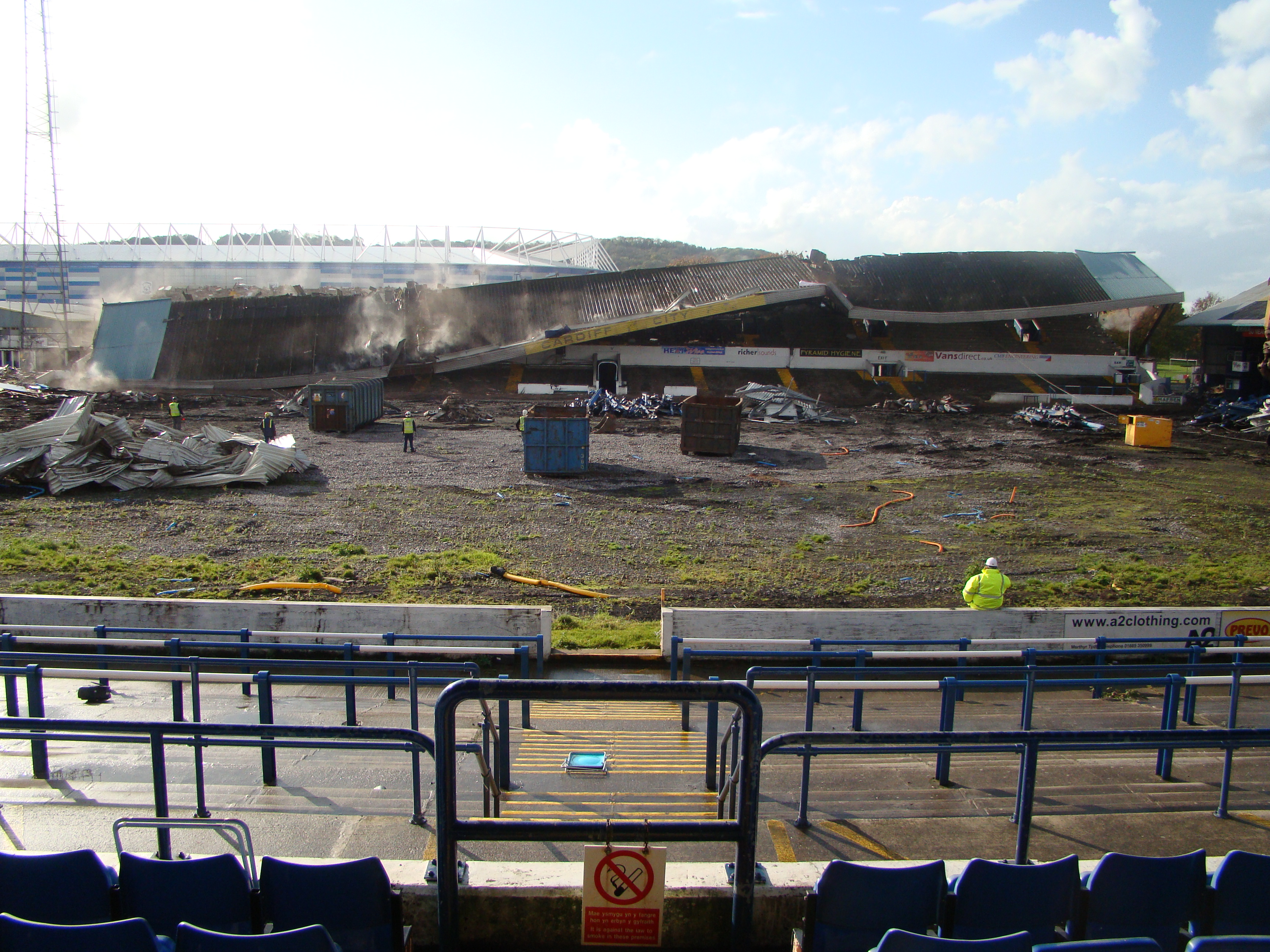
The roof of the Grandstand coming down

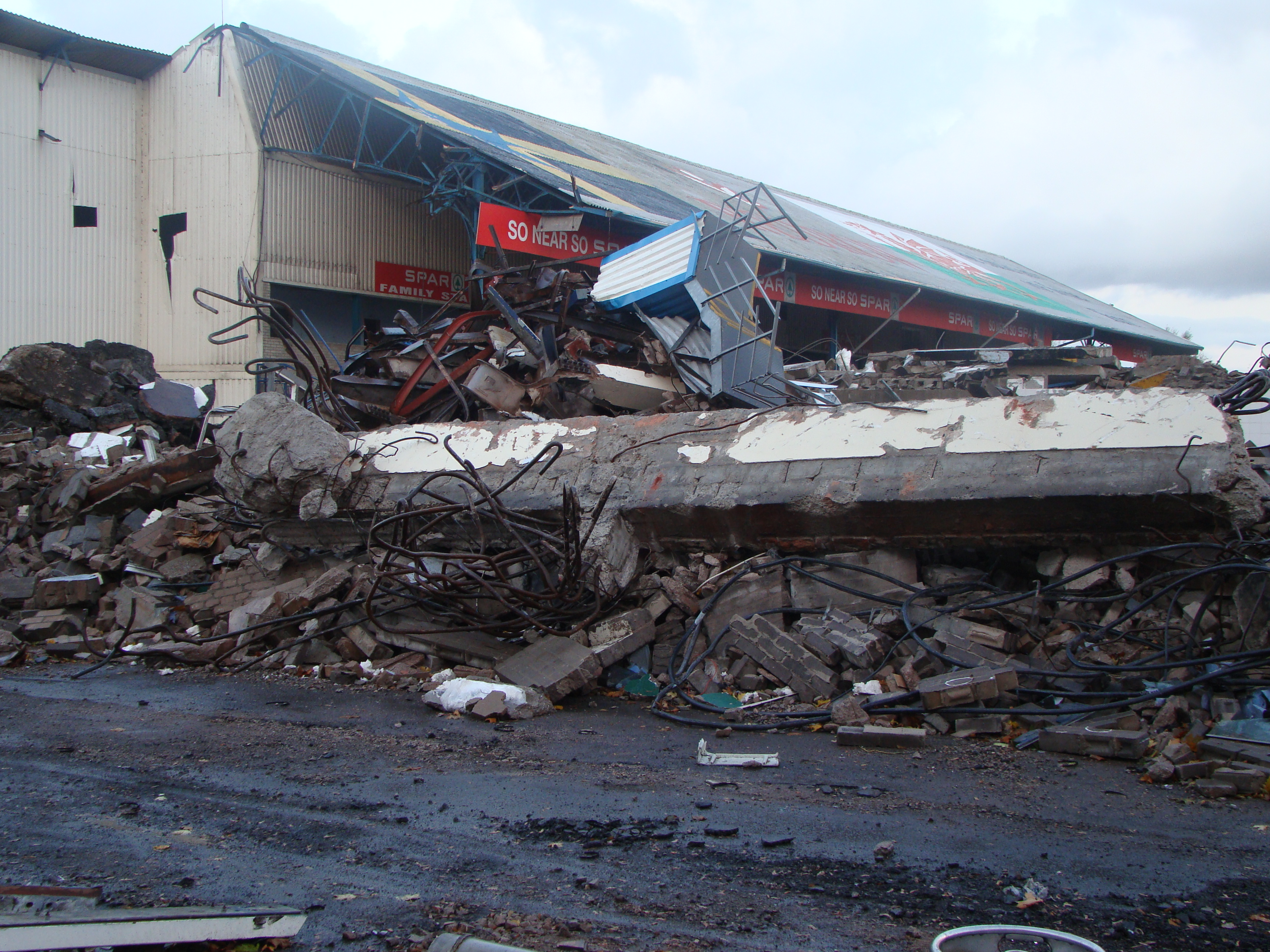
Canton Stand

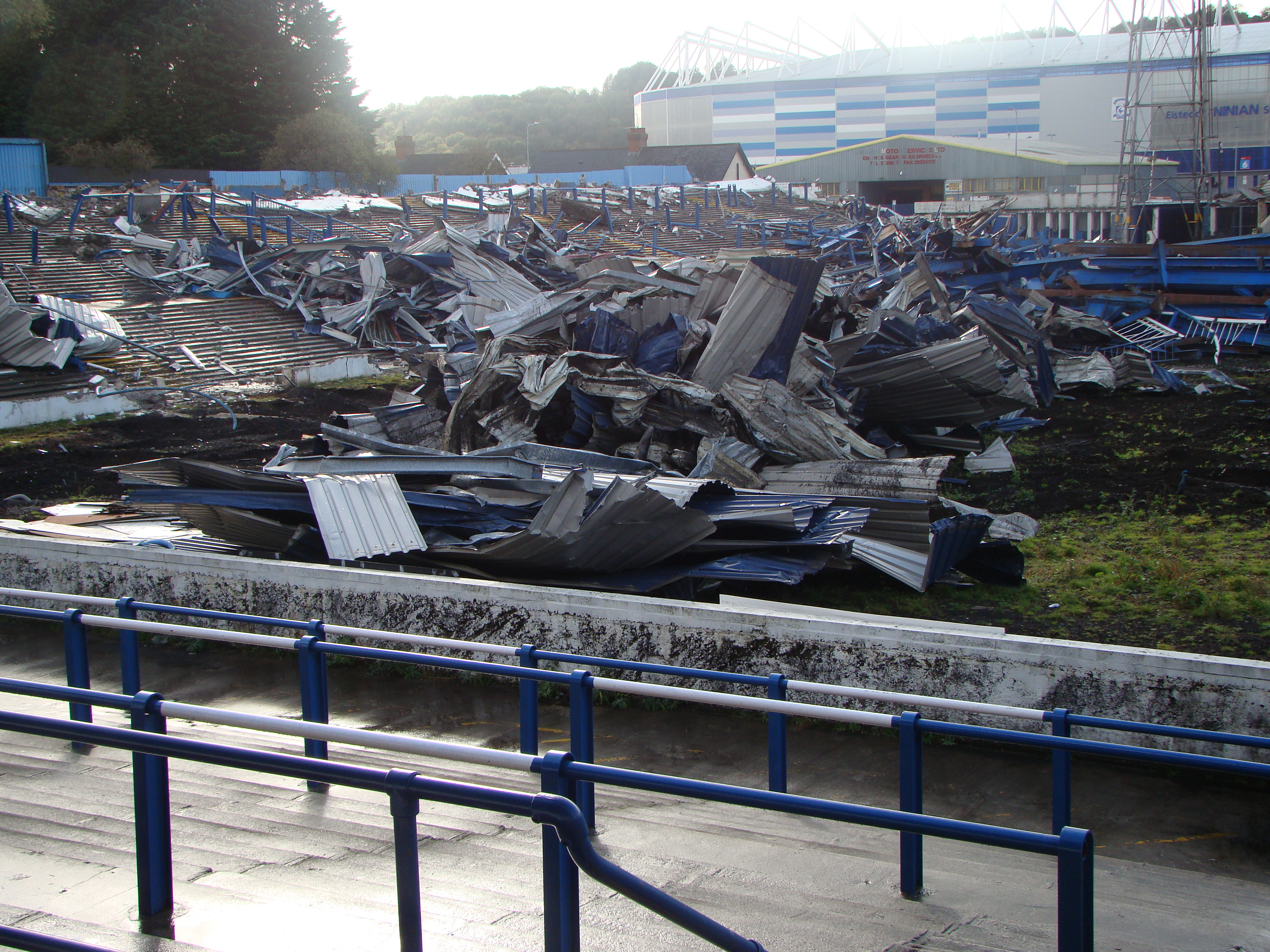
Grange End

The last football match played by Cardiff at Ninian Park was a 3–0 defeat by Ipswich Town on 25 April 2009. The final senior player to score at the ground was Jon Stead, then of Ipswich Town; the last player for Cardiff to score at the ground was Ross McCormack in a 3–1 victory over Burnley in the penultimate senior game at Ninian Park. After the final match, an online memorabilia auction was set up, with items such as goalposts, office furniture and supporters' seats being listed for sale. In July 2009, the gates of the Ninian Park ground were re-erected opposite the stadium site, though minus one of the bluebird logos which had gone missing following the final match.

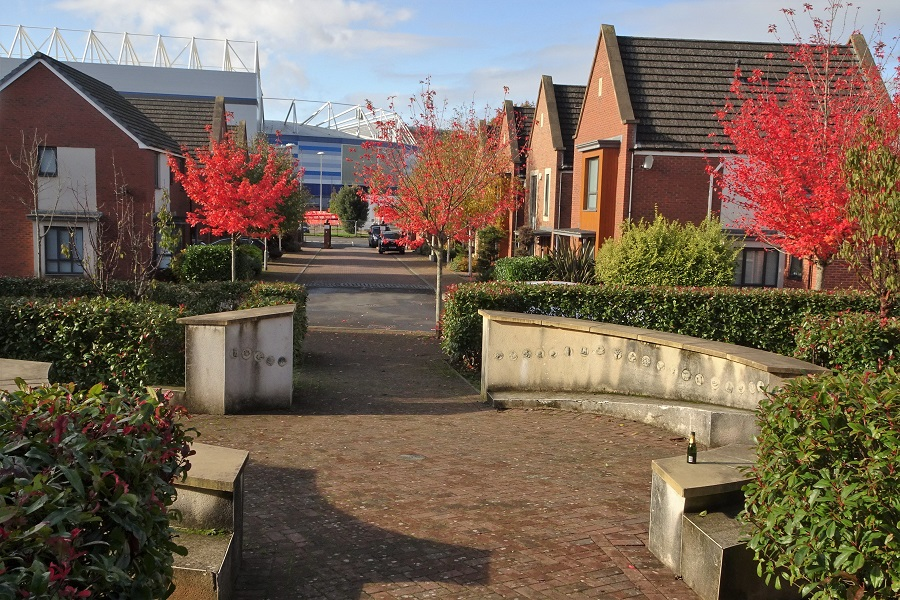
Gardens and artwork on Bartley Wilson Way, marking the Ninian Park centre spot

The stadium was handed over to Redrow Homes by Cardiff chairman Peter Ridsdale on 10 September 2009. The 99-year-old Ninian Park was demolished later in 2009 to make way for a housing development. Redrow built 142 houses on the site, intending to retain the name Ninian Park. A planted square was proposed at the centre of the new housing development, in the area of Ninian Park's centre spot. The first show home of the £24 million development was opened in late spring 2010, with a mixture of terraced, detached and semi-detached houses. The first families moved into the new housing in November 2010. After completion, the road through the development was named Bartley Wilson Way after the founder of Cardiff City.

== Structure and facilities ==
At the time of its closure in 2009, Ninian Park had a capacity of 21,508 and comprised four stands; the Grandstand, the Grange End, the Popular Bank and the Canton Stand.

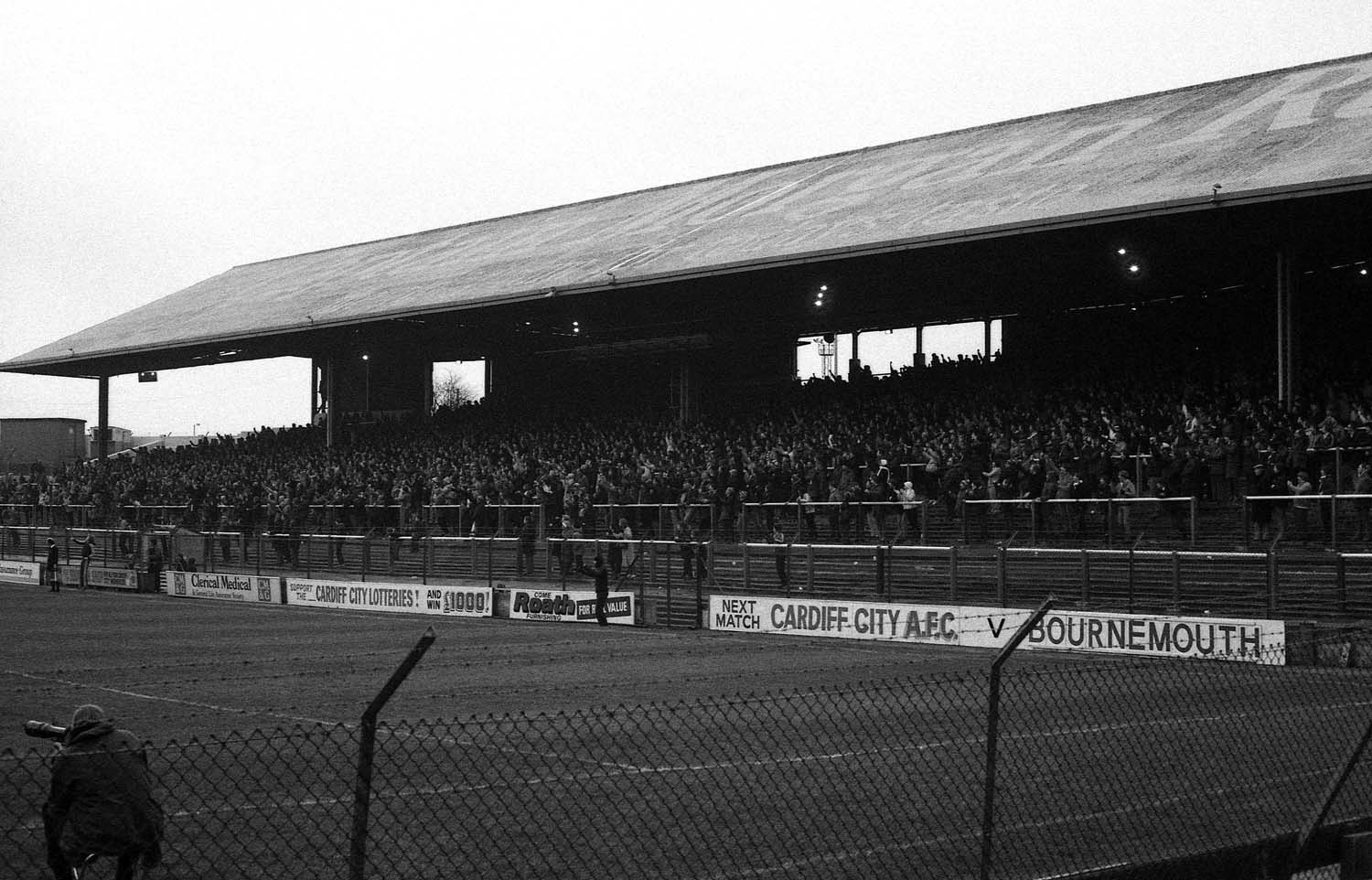
The Popular Bank in 1983 with the advert for Captain Morgan visible on the roof.

The Grandstand was an all-seated stand that was built before the Second World War to replace the original wooden structure that had been destroyed in a fire. The stand had originally contained a standing section at the bottom, but this was later converted to seats. Press areas reserved for journalists had been located in the stand since 1960. Directly opposite was the Popular Bank, which was commonly referred to as the "Bob Bank" as it previously cost one shilling (known as one bob) to enter. It was originally an all-standing construction with no roof on its completion in 1910. A roof was constructed in 1958, and the top half of the stand was converted to seating in the early 1990s. The Popular Bank became well known for the advertising featured on the roof of the stand. In 1960, an advert for Captain Morgan rum, named after Sir Henry Morgan who hailed from Cardiff, was painted on the roof and remained in place for 42 years. The advert was the longest running stadium roof advert in the history of The Football League. It was replaced in 2001 by an advert for Hyper Value.

The Grange End and Canton Stand were both named after local districts in the city, Grangetown and Canton. The Grange End also housed visiting away fans and due to crowd trouble, had featured a 6 ft (1.8 m) fence to separate opposing fans and netting to stop objects being thrown. It was removed in 2006, becoming the last venue in the Football League to remove fencing between opposing fans. The Canton Stand also housed executive boxes, hospitality areas and several club offices. These areas had originally been commissioned in the 1980s but financial difficulties at the club delayed the completion of the project until 2001. The ground featured floodlights in each corner and a plasma-screen television showed highlights during the game. The television was bought by the club in 2002 from Bolton Wanderers. They had used the screen in their former ground Burnden Park before moving to the Reebok Stadium. It was located between the Popular Bank and the Grange End.

== Transport ==
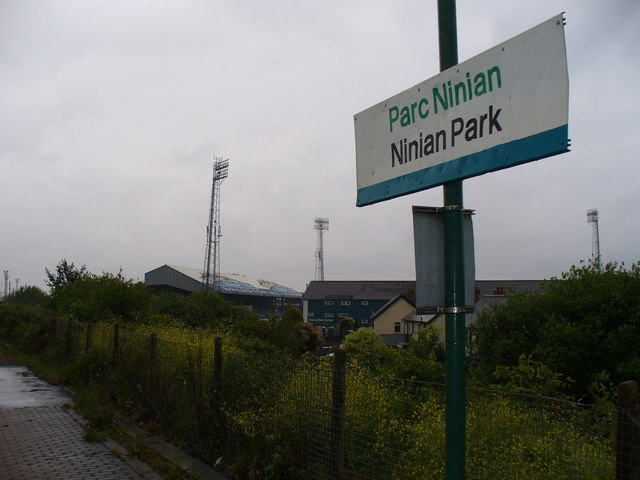
Ninian Park railway station

The stadium and surrounding area was served by Ninian Park railway station (on the Cardiff City Line) on one side of Sloper Road and Grangetown railway station (on the Vale Line) on the other side. Ninian Park Station (originally named Ninian Park Halt) was built in 1912 by the Taff Vale Railway at the junction of Sloper Road and Leckwith Road. Railway officials had been encouraged by increasing crowd numbers at the club's matches and looked to capitalise on the interest. When the railway was privatised, the stations became part of the Valley Lines. Trains operated frequently to Central and Queen Street stations. By road, the stadium was also served by the A4232 dual carriageway, which is approximately 0.7 miles (1.13 km) away from the Leckwith Interchange.

== Other usage ==
=== Sporting events ===
==== Rugby ====
Cardiff Rugby Club played at Ninian Park twice between 1960 and 1961 as their ground did not have floodlights. The Cardiff City Blue Dragons rugby league team used the ground as their home between 1981 and 1984. The team had been founded by Cardiff City director Bob Grogan as a way of generating income and ensuring that Ninian Park was being used more frequently. Initially the project proved a moderate success. Having been set up at a cost of less than £50,000, the side was credited with keeping the football club afloat by former Cardiff director Tony Clemo, who commented "We weren't getting many through the gates but rugby league helped to keep Cardiff City going [...] The Blue Dragons income was paying the rents and rates and there was always a small profit at the end of the day." The team's first match against Salford on 31 August 1981 attracted more than 9,000 spectators. However, the Blue Dragons failed to reach the top tier of Rugby league and crowds dropped to below 1,000 by the end of the first season. Grogan's death soon after led to the club folding after a year playing in Bridgend.

The Welsh national rugby league team, the Wales Dragons, used Ninian Park as one of its home venues. The ground hosted seven internationals between 1981 and 1995 with the first match a 15–20 defeat to England in November 1981. Ahead of the game, rugby officials had hoped to draw a crowd of more than 10,000 but the final figure was around 8,000. The Dragons held a 3–3 record at Ninian Park, winning their last game 28–6 over France before the largest international rugby league crowd at the ground (a sellout 10,250) on their way to a semi-final berth in the 1995 Rugby League World Cup. The 1999 final of the WRU Challenge Cup was also held at the ground, featuring Swansea RFC defeating Llanelli RFC 37–10.

=== Rugby league internationals ===
List of international rugby league matches played at Ninian Park.

Game#	Date	Result	Attendance	Notes
1	8 November 1981	England def. Wales 20–15	8,102	1981 Wales vs England
2	24 October 1982	Australia def. Wales 37–7	5,617	1982 Kangaroo Tour – Wales vs Australia
3	4 March 1994	Wales def. France 20–15	8,102	1994 Wales vs France
4	30 October 1994	Australia def. Wales 46–4	8,729	1994 Kangaroo Tour – Wales vs Australia
5	1 February 1995	Wales def. England 18–16	6,252	1995 European Rugby League Championship
6	9 October 1995	Wales def. France 28–6	10,250	1995 Rugby League World Cup Group C
7	12 October 1995	Western Samoa def. France 56–10	2,173	1995 Rugby League World Cup Group C

==== Other ====
Cardiff-born boxer Jack Petersen fought at the ground on several occasions, including victories over Hein Müller and George Cook that attracted crowds of more than 40,000. The ground also hosted several boxing World title fights; Ronnie James contested the first World title fight ever held in Wales when he fought American Ike Williams for the NBA Lightweight Title in September 1946. The bout lasted until the ninth round when reigning champion Williams knocked James out in front of a crowd of 45,000 people. Howard Winstone's rematch against reigning WBC and WBA featherweight champion Vicente Saldivar was also held at Ninian Park; Salvidar claimed a narrow victory over Winstone by half a point.

During the 1958 British Empire and Commonwealth Games held in Cardiff, Ninian Park hosted the show jumping championships, although the sport was only an exhibition event at the games. A trial event to inform 1960 Summer Olympics equestrian team selection was also hosted at the ground in May 1960. Other sporting uses included hosting an exhibition basketball game between the Harlem Globetrotters and the United States Star Basketeers Team in June 1958 and an American football match featuring the Cardiff Tigers team in 1986.

=== Concerts ===
The ground has been used for numerous other events. Pope John Paul II visited the city on 2 June 1982, touring several locations, appearing at a National Youth Rally held at Ninian Park attended by 35,000 people. As part of his Rastaman Vibration Tour, reggae singer Bob Marley staged a concert at the ground on 19 June 1976 for the West Coast Rock Show. He was supported by Country Joe and the Fish and Eric Burdon among others. The concert had originally been scheduled for Stephen Stills. When he was unable to play, Marley filled the date.

== Records ==
The highest attendance recorded at the ground is 62,634, for a match between Wales and England on 17 October 1959 in the 1959–60 British Home Championship. Cardiff City's record attendance at the ground was 57,893 during a league fixture against Arsenal on 22 April 1953. Although a match against Swansea Town in August 1949 sold 60,855 tickets only an attendance of 57,510 was recorded through the turnstiles on the day. The ground holds the record for the highest attendance for a Welsh Cup match after 37,500 fans watched Cardiff defeat Swansea Town 3–2 in the 1956 final. It also holds the record for the highest non-final Welsh Cup attendance with 22,500 fans attending a semifinal between Cardiff and Merthyr Tydfil in 1949.

The highest season average attendance record was set during the 1952–53 season with 37,937. The lowest season average was recorded in the 1986–87 season with 2,856. That season also included the club's lowest ever home attendance for a fixture in the Football League when 1,510 fans attended a match against Hartlepool United on 7 May.

== See also ==
- Leckwith development
- Sport in Cardiff
