= 1990–91 Lancashire Cup =

- Structure: Regional knockout championship
- Teams: 17
- Winners: Widnes
- Runners-up: Salford

The 1990–91 Lancashire Cup was the 78th occasion on which the Lancashire Cup competition had been held. Widnes won the trophy by beating Salford by the score of 24-18 in the final.

== Background ==
The total entrants remained the same as last season, i.e. at 17.
This necessitated the need for a preliminary round (consisting of just 1 game. The first round (proper) then involved 16 clubs.

== Competition and results ==
=== Preliminary round ===
Involved 1 match and 2 clubs

Game No	Fixture Date	Home team	Score	Away team	Venue	Att	Notes	Ref
1	19 August 1990	Rochdale Hornets	12–41	Salford	Spotland	2,049	1	

=== First round ===
Involved eight matches (with no byes) and 16 clubs.

Game No	Fixture Date	Home team	Score	Away team	Venue	Att	Notes	Ref
1	26 August 1990	Carlisle	38–18	Workington Town	Gifford Park	1,104		
2	26 August 1990	Fulham	50–0	Runcorn Highfield	Crystal Palace NSC	623	2	
3	26 August 1990	Leigh	26–6	Swinton	Hilton Park	3,137		
4	26 August 1990	St Helens	56–24	Trafford Borough	Knowsley Road	4,827		
5	26 August 1990	Salford	27–24	Oldham	The Willows	4,236		
6	26 August 1990	Warrington	36–8	Chorley Borough	Wilderspool	3,143		
7	26 August 1990	Whitehaven	6–70	Widnes	Recreation Ground	4,054		
8	26 August 1990	Wigan	70–8	Barrow	Central Park	8,377		

=== Second round ===
Involved four matches and eight clubs

Game No	Fixture Date	Home team	Score	Away team	Venue	Att	Notes	Ref
1	2 September 1990	Carlisle	7–28	Warrington	Gifford Park	1,596		
2	2 September 1990	Leigh	40–8	Fulham	Hilton Park	2,909		
3	2 September 1990	Salford	21–7	St. Helens	The Willows	5,574		
4	2 September 1990	Widnes	24–22	Wigan	Naughton Park	14,035		

=== Semi-finals ===
Involved two matches and four clubs

Game No	Fixture Date	Home team	Score	Away team	Venue	Att	Notes	Ref
1	12 September 1990	Salford	16–7	Leigh	The Willows	6,939		
2	12 September 1990	Widnes	20–4	Warrington	Naughton Park	11,708	3	

=== Final ===
The match was played at Central Park, Wigan (historically in the county of Lancashire). The attendance was 7,485 and receipts were £36,867.

29 September 1990

Widnes	24 – 18	Salford
Tries: Currier, Myler, Offiah, Smith; Goals: Davies (4)		Tries: Blease, Fell, Williams; Goals: Kerry (3)

Central Park, Wigan
Attendance: 7,485
Referee: Alan Burke (Oldham)
Player of the Match: David Fell

==== Teams and scorers ====
Widnes	No.	Salford
	Teams	
Alan Tait	1	Steve Gibson
Darren Wright	2	Tex Evans
Andy Currier	3	Martin Birkett
Jonathan Davies	4	Peter Williams
Martin Offiah	5	Adrian Hadley
Tony Myler (c)	6	David Fell
David Hulme	7	Steve Kerry
Kurt Sorensen	8	Ian Sherratt
Phil McKenzie	9	Mark Lee
Chris Ashurst	10	Chris Whiteley
Richard Eyres	11	Arthur Bradshaw
Emosi Koloto	12	Ian Blease (c)
Les Holliday	13	Andy Burgess
	Subs	
John Devereux	14	Frank Cassidy (for Steve Kerry, 72mins)
David Smith (for Chris Ashurst, 31mins)	15	Shane Hansen (for Chris Whiteley, 31mins)
Doug Laughton	Coach	Kevin Tamati

=== The road to success ===
(This chart excludes the match in the preliminary round)

First round
Whitehaven	6
Widnes	70
Wigan	70
Barrow	8
Carlisle	38
Workington Town	18
Warrington	36
Chorley Borough (2)	8
Salford	27
Oldham	24
St. Helens	56
Trafford Borough	24
Leigh	26
Swinton	6
Fulham	50
Runcorn Highfield	0

Second round
Widnes	24
Wigan	22
Carlisle	7
Warrington	28
Salford	21
St. Helens	7
Leigh	40
Fulham	8

Semi-finals
Widnes	20
Warrington	4
Salford	16
Leigh	7

Final
Widnes	24
Salford	18

== Notes and comments ==
1 * The first Lancashire Cup match to be played at Rochdale Hornets's new ground
2 * The first Lancashire Cup match to be played on this ground, one of many used by Fulham during the nomadic period between 1985 and 1993
3 * The attendance is given as 11,708 in the official Widnes archives - RUGBYLEAGUEproject gives the attendance as 12,028.

== See also ==
- 1990–91 Rugby Football League season
- Rugby league county cups
