= Phil Cantillon =

Former GB, England & Ireland international rugby league footballer

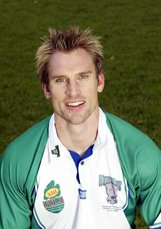

Personal information
- Born: 2 June 1976 (age 50) Wigan, Greater Manchester, England

Playing information
- Position: Hooker
Club
Years	Team	Pld	T	G	FG	P
1992–95	Wigan
1995–97	Keighley Cougars	62	13	0	0	52
1997–98	Leeds Rhinos	3	1	0	0	4
1998	→ Bramley (loan)	3	0	0	0	0
1998	Whitehaven	7	1	0	0	4
1999–03	Widnes Vikings	152	115	0	0	460
2004	Halifax	26	9	0	0	36
2005–06	Rochdale Hornets	41	25	0	0	100
2007	Blackpool Panthers	29	17	0	0	68
	Total	323	181	0	0	724
Representative
Years	Team	Pld	T	G	FG	P
2003–06	Ireland	7	9	0	0	36
1996–2003	England	10	4	0	0	16
1992–1995	Great Britain	7	3	0	0	12

Coaching information
Club
Years	Team	Gms	W	D	L	W%
2008–10	Blackpool Panthers

Phil Cantillon (born 2 June 1976) is an England and Ireland dual international former professional rugby league footballer who played professionally from 1992 to 2007. He successfully captained Ireland and broke numerous try-scoring world records at club and international level.

== Playing career ==
=== Early career ===
Cantillon started his career at his hometown club Wigan in 1992, signing at 16 years old. Cantillon, at 18 years old, captained the Great Britain Academy Select XIII team in their match against Tartarstan, and toured France—where they won 36-0—and Australia with the Great Britain Under-19s team. He won the annual sevens tournament in the Wigan first team in 1994. In 1994/95; Wigan were the world club champions and dominated the domestic game. He was targeted as a star signing by the Great Britain coach, and signed him for an undisclosed record fee in 1995.

With the launch of Super League in 1995 and the move from winter to summer sport, Great Britain coach Phil Larder signed Cantillon for the then star studded Keighley Cougars – becoming an immediate star with his no nonsense style and try scoring ability. He scored a hat trick on his début against Wakefield, gaining star status and quickly gaining full international honours by the end of the year.

Cantillon went on to play for England in the 1996 Super League World Nines in Fiji under Phil Larder eventually losing to Australia. He scored a memorable full-length solo try in the 1996 Divisional Premiership Final at Old Trafford against the Salford Reds. Keighley went into administration in 1997, and Cantillon was one of several players sold to the Leeds Rhinos to clear the club's debt. He quickly made his impact scoring on his debut against Wigan in August 1997. He was part of the 1998 squad that was runners-up in the inaugural Super League final loss to Wigan at Old Trafford. Following injury he went on loan to Whitehaven, scoring on debut, before injury again finished his season. He then signed for the Widnes Vikings for the start of the 1999 season.

=== Widnes Vikings ===
The hooker and utility star became a firm favourite of the fans. His speed, leadership and balance aided him in his career, which saw him successfully captain Ireland Rugby League and break many try scoring records including world records, at club and international level. In doing so, Cantillon is recognized as one of the best try scoring forwards. He also scored one of fastest tries in the history of the game in 2000, scoring after 18 seconds of play. He was named in the top five best hookers in the world during 1999–2004.

He was credited for the evolution of the modern day hooker role during the nineties and noughties by Rugby League media through his captaincy, support play, evasive running, try scoring ability and defensive qualities.

Cantillon played for Widnes where he ran up a remarkable tally of 117 tries in five years, playing over 100 consecutive games. Cantillon took out the Tom Bergin Trophy as man of the match in the 2001 Grand Final victory. Cantillon is placed ninth in the all-time list of club try scorers which features many legends from the Widnes cup kings and world champions era of dominance, with the highest ever for a forward. Cantillon was also selected for England for the World Sevens in Australia in 2003, taking them to the final loss against the Parramatta Eels with two tries in a man of the match performance in both the semi-final against Manly and France in the quarter finals.

During his five seasons at Widnes, Cantillon broke many try scoring records including a world record for most tries in a season with 48 in 2001 surpassing the legendary and iconic Great Britain captain Ellery Hanley in doing so. He is the only player to have scored five tries in a match more than once, doing so three times in 1999, 2000 and 2001. Cantillon went on to smash the record with seven in one match, holding the world record for most tries in a match by a forward. He scored a total of 115 tries from 152 appearances placing him in the top ten all time try scorers for Widnes. Cantillon's try scoring exploits catapulted Widnes back into Super League where they narrowly missed out on the top five. Cantillon broke the world record in 2000 for most tries by a hooker with 30, before yet another try scoring world record breaking season in 2001, where he displayed exceptional leadership and durability in leading the Vikings to success. After several years away, Cantillon returned to Wigan in July 2002 in the runup to the Super League playoffs.

Cantillon retired from professional rugby league in 2007 after a 16-season professional career, with spells at Wigan, Keighley Cougars, Leeds Rhinos, Widnes Vikings, Halifax, Rochdale Hornets and finally a player coach role at the now defunct Blackpool. He has a try scoring record for scoring for all professional clubs on debut.

Cantillon went on to play in 2011 with other Rugby League legends from over the past years in an effort to raise money for charity with Great Britain All Stars.

Whilst still playing professionally in the early 2000s, and following his retirement, Cantillon was appointed in a number of general manager positions in the commercial, not for profit and local government sector.

=== International career ===
Cantillon was named captain of the Ireland national rugby league team in 2003, qualifying for under the grandparent rule after firstly representing England. Ireland enjoyed an outstanding European Nations tournament, finally losing to France in Dublin, with firstly an away win versus Scotland in which Cantillon scored his first try for Ireland.

Cantillon led Ireland to the European Nations Final against England in 2004 scoring a record four tries in a semi-final victory over Scotland and to World Cup qualifying wins against Russia and Lebanon in 2005 and 2006, ensuring they booked their place for the 2008 World Cup in Australia, signing of his performances by holding the record for number of tries scored by any player for Ireland R.L with ten and most tries in a match with four, taking them to be ranked 2nd best international team in Europe. He was named as one of the greatest players to play for Ireland Rugby League. He was the European Nations Tournaments top try scorer in 2004 with five tries.

Cantillon also represented England in the inaugural World Nines in 1996 in Fiji, and represented England in the World Sevens in 2003 in Australia, and Great Britain Academy from 1992–1995 which he captained.

== See also ==
- Super League World Nines

Sporting positions
Preceded by Martin Crompton; 2007-2008	Coach Blackpool Panthers; 2008-2010	Succeeded by Club folded
