= Jean-Philippe Pougeau =

Former France international rugby league footballer

Personal information
- Born: France

Playing information
- Position: Fullback
Club
Years	Team	Pld	T	G	FG	P
	AS Saint-Estève
Representative
Years	Team	Pld	T	G	FG	P
1987–90	France	6	0	0	0	0
1988	Rest of the World	1	0	0	0	0

Jean-Philippe Pougeau is a French rugby league player who represented France national rugby league team.

He later started a restaurant in Saint-Estève.
