= Ian Blease =

English rugby league footballer & RL administrator

Personal information
- Full name: Ian Blease
- Born: 1 January 1965 (age 61) Swinton, Lancashire, England

Playing information
- Position: Prop, Second-row
Club
Years	Team	Pld	T	G	FG	P
1985–97	Salford	252	49	0	0	196
1998–99	Swinton	48	3	0	0	12
	Total	300	52	0	0	208
Representative
Years	Team	Pld	T	G	FG	P
1991	Lancashire	1	0	0	0	0

Ian Blease (born 1 January 1965) is an English former professional rugby league footballer who played as a prop or second-row for Salford and Swinton. He also represented Lancashire on one occasion in 1991.

== Playing career ==
=== Salford ===
Born in the Swinton suburb in the city of Salford, Blease joined Salford in 1985 from Folly Lane ARL. He became the team's captain in 1990, and went on to make 252 appearances for the club before moving to Swinton in January 1998.

Blease played as a substitute (replacing fullback Peter Williams) in Salford's 17–22 defeat by Wigan in the 1988–89 Lancashire Cup Final during the 1988–89 season at Knowsley Road, St Helens on Sunday 23 October 1988, and played second-row, was captain, and scored a try in the 18–24 defeat by Widnes in the 1990–91 Lancashire Cup Final during the 1990–91 season at Central Park, Wigan on Saturday 29 September 1990.

In 1996, Blease helped Salford win promotion to the Super League by winning the Division One championship. He also played for Salford at Old Trafford in the 19–6 victory against Keighley Cougars in the 1996 Divisional Premiership.

In 1997, Blease was banned sine die for assaulting a touch judge. The ban was reduced to 10 months following an appeal.

=== Representative honours ===
Blease played one match for Lancashire in September 1991 against Yorkshire at Headingley.

== Post-playing career ==
In 2016, Blease was brought back to the club by Salford's former owner Marwan Koukash as chief executive officer.
