= Paul Atcheson =

Former Great Britain and Wales international rugby league footballer

Personal information
- Born: 17 May 1973 (age 53) St Helens, Lancashire, England

Playing information
- Position: Fullback
Club
Years	Team	Pld	T	G	FG	P
1990–92	Widnes	7	1	0	0	4
1992–95	Wigan	62	11	0	0	44
1996–97	Oldham Bears	67	29	0	0	119
1997–00	St Helens	70	19	0	0	76
2000–04	Widnes Vikings	70	7	0	0	28
	Total	276	67	0	0	271
Representative
Years	Team	Pld	T	G	FG	P
1993	Great Britain U-21	1
1995–03	Wales	17	5	0	0	20
1997	Great Britain	3	0	0	0	0

Paul 'Patch' Atcheson (born 17 May 1973) is a former Wales international rugby league footballer who played in the 1990s and 2000s. He played at representative level for Great Britain and Wales, and at club level for the Widnes Vikings (two spells), Wigan, Oldham Bears and St Helens, as a fullback.

== Background ==
Atcheson was born in St Helens, Lancashire, England.

== Playing career ==
=== Widnes ===
Paul Atcheson was a substitute in Widnes' 24–0 victory over Leeds in the 1991–92 Regal Trophy Final during the 1991–92 season at Central Park, Wigan on Saturday 11 January 1992.

=== Wigan ===
After the 1993–94 Rugby Football League season Atcheson travelled with defending champions Wigan to Brisbane, playing from the interchange bench in their 1994 World Club Challenge victory over Australian premiers, the Brisbane Broncos. Atcheson made one appearance for Great Britain Under-21s in 1993, and won caps for Wales national rugby league team while at Wigan in 1995 against England, France, and in the 1995 Rugby League World Cup against Western Samoa. Paul Atcheson appeared as a substitute (replacing centre Va'aiga Tuigamala) in Wigan's 40–10 victory over Warrington in the 1994–95 Regal Trophy Final during the 1994–95 season at Alfred McAlpine Stadium, Huddersfield on Saturday 28 January 1995.

=== Oldham ===
While at Oldham in 1996 he played for Wales against France, and England. In the 1997 post season, Atcheson was selected to play for Great Britain national rugby league team in all three matches of the Super League Test series against Australia. He also signed with St Helens.

=== St Helens ===
While at St. Helens in 1998 Atcheson played for Wales against England. Atcheson played for St. Helens at fullback in their 1999 Super League Grand Final victory over Bradford Bulls. Having won the 1999 Championship St. Helens contested in the 2000 World Club Challenge against National Rugby League Premiers the Melbourne Storm, with Atcheson playing fullback in the loss.

=== Widnes ===
Atcheson played for Wales while at Widnes in 2000 against South Africa, in the 2000 Rugby League World Cup against Cook Islands, Lebanon, New Zealand, Papua New Guinea, and Australia, in 2001 against England, in 2002 against New Zealand, and in 2003 against Russia, and Australia.
