= Jean-Marc Garcia =

Former France international rugby league footballer

Personal information
- Born: 22 April 1971 (age 54) France
- Height: 1.80 m (5 ft 11 in)
- Weight: 95 kg (14 st 13 lb)

Playing information
- Position: Wing
Club
Years	Team	Pld	T	G	FG	P
	AS Saint Estève
1995–97	Sheffield Eagles		26	0	0	104
1997–99	AS Saint Estève
2000–01	Union Treiziste Catalane
2001–03	Lézignan Sangliers
	Total	0	26	0	0	104
Representative
Years	Team	Pld	T	G	FG	P
1991–00	France	40	16	0	0	64
- Source: RLP

Jean-Marc Garcia is a French rugby league footballer who represented France in the 1995 and 2000 World Cups.

== Playing career ==
Garcia played for AS Saint Estève in the French Rugby League Championship. He was first selected for France in 1991 and spent the rest of the decade as part of the side, playing in forty test matches.

In 1995 Garcia transferred to the Sheffield Eagles. At the end of the year he was named as part of France's World Cup side. Garcia remained with Sheffield for three seasons, leaving at the end of 1997 to rejoin AS Saint Estève. He again played for France in the 2000 World Cup.

French captain 1996–2000.
