= David Smith (rugby league, born 1968) =

English rugby league footballer

Personal information
- Born: 15 March 1968 (age 57)

Playing information
- Position: Prop, Second-row
Club
Years	Team	Pld	T	G	FG	P
1989–95	Widnes	110	6	0	0	24

David Smith (born 15 March 1968) is an English former professional rugby league footballer who played for Widnes as a prop or second-row forward.

== Playing career ==
=== Widnes ===
Smith spent six years at Widnes, and was part of the squad that won the 1989 World Club Challenge against the Canberra Raiders.

Smith appeared as a substitute in Widnes' 24–18 win against Salford in the 1990–91 Lancashire Cup Final at Central Park, Wigan on 29 September 1990, and also played in the 24–0 victory over Leeds in the 1991–92 Regal Trophy Final at Central Park, Wigan on 11 January 1992.
