= Karl Jaavuo =

France international rugby league footballer

Personal information
- Born: 11 February 1969 (age 56) Townsville, Queensland, Australia

Playing information
- Position: Prop
Club
Years	Team	Pld	T	G	FG	P
	Pia Donkeys
Representative
Years	Team	Pld	T	G	FG	P
1994–95	France	4	0	0	0	0

Karl Jaavuo (born in Townsville, on 11 February 1969) is an Australian-born French former professional rugby league footballer who represented France at the 1995 World Cup.

== Playing career ==
Jaavuo made his debut for France in 1994 against the touring Australian side. In 1995 he played in three matches for France at the World Cup.

He played for the Pia Donkeys in the 2004 Challenge Cup, getting sin-binned in their final match against the Huddersfield Giants.
