= Phil McKenzie =

Australian rugby league footballer

Personal information
- Born: 13 June 1963 (age 62) Australia

Playing information
- Position: Hooker
Club
Years	Team	Pld	T	G	FG	P
1982–83	Illawarra Steelers	10	1	0	0	4
1985–86	Rochdale Hornets	33	19	0	0	76
1986–93	Widnes	213	52	0	0	208
1993–96	Workington Town
	Total	256	72	0	0	288

Phil McKenzie (born 13 June 1963) is an Australian former professional rugby league footballer who played as a hooker in the 1980s and 1990s.

He started his career in his home country, playing for Illawarra Steelers for two years before moving to England, where he played for Rochdale Hornets, Widnes and Workington Town.

== Playing career ==
=== Representative career ===
Although born in Australia, McKenzie was eligible to play for Great Britain through his Scottish-born father. Despite making himself available for selection however, McKenzie never appeared for Great Britain.

=== County Cup Final appearances ===
Phil McKenzie played hooker in Widnes' 24-18 victory over Salford in the 1990 Lancashire Cup Final during the 1990–91 season at Central Park, Wigan on Saturday 29 September 1990.

=== John Player Special Trophy Final appearances ===
Phil McKenzie played hooker in Widnes' 6-12 defeat by Wigan in the 1988–89 John Player Special Trophy Final during the 1988–89 season at Burnden Park, Bolton on Saturday 7 January 1989.
