= Brian J. Cole =

American surgeon

Brian J. Cole (born 1962) is an American orthopedic surgeon, professor and chairman of the department of orthopaedics at Rush University Medical Center in Chicago, and the chairman of surgery at Oak Park Hospital in Oak Park, Illinois. He is the managing partner of Midwest Orthopaedics at Rush, a top-ranked orthopaedic department in the United States. He is a sports medicine clinician-scientist specializing in shoulder, elbow, and knee injuries and has an interest in arthroscopy, cartilage restoration, and the use of OrthoBiologics. He is well known for his work with professional and university sports teams, working as the head team physician for the Chicago Bulls, Chicago Dogs, Joffrey Ballet Chicago, and DePaul University and co-team physician for the Chicago White Sox and Chicago Fire. He frequently treats professional athletes and is asked for second opinions by his colleagues to help with the care of high-profile athletes from virtually every sport both nationally and internationally.

== Education ==
Brian Cole graduated from the University of Illinois Urbana-Champaign in 1985 where he received Bachelor of Science Degrees in Biology and Psychology. He earned his Doctor of Medicine and Master’s in Business Administration in 1991 at the University of Chicago Pritzker School of Medicine and Booth School of Business, respectively. After completing his medical and business degrees, he completed a general surgical internship at Loyola University in Chicago, Illinois in 1991 and an orthopedic research fellowship in metabolic bone disease at The Hospital for Special Surgery in New York in 1992. He then completed an orthopedic residency at The Hospital for Special Surgery in 1996 and a Sports Medicine Fellowship in 1997 at The University of Pittsburgh in Pittsburgh, Pennsylvania.

== Medical career ==
Cole is the current director of the Rush Cartilage Restoration Center. At Rush University, he is a medical researcher and surgeon, Professor in the Department of Orthopaedics, Anatomy and Cell Biology, and head of the Orthopedic Master’s Training Program where he mentors residents and fellows.

Cole’s specialties include sports medicine, cartilage transplantation, arthroscopy, and shoulder, elbow and knee surgery. He is known for performing various surgeries including arthroscopic rotator cuff repairs, shoulder stabilization, shoulder replacements, ACL reconstructions, meniscal allograft transplantations, cartilage cell transplantations, and fresh osteochondral allograft transplantations.

He is among the world’s most published and cited orthopedic sports medicine researchers publishing more than 1,000 articles and 10 textbooks on basic science and clinical research of orthopedic surgery and sports medicine. His research interests are specifically in cartilage transplantation, regenerative medicine, biologic alternatives, rotator cuff healing, and shoulder instability.

=== Sports Medicine ===
Cole is the head team physician for the Chicago Bulls, Chicago Dogs, Joffrey Ballet and DePaul University and co-team physician for the Chicago White Sox and Chicago Fire Soccer Club.

=== Sports Medicine Weekly Podcast ===
Sports Medicine Weekly began in 2010 as a radio talk show on ESPN Radio featuring Brian Cole and host Steve Kashul from NBC Sports Chicago. In 2018, the show was subsequently broadcast on 670TheScore until becoming fully digital as a widely recognized podcast in 2020. The digital podcast is now hosted by Cole and shares informative content through interviewing professionals including surgeons, therapists, coaches, trainers, and athletes. Proceeds from the podcast are donated to Rush University Medical Center for the advancement of orthopedic and cell biology research

== Professional Membership and Awards ==
Cole is a member of various societies and served as the president of the Arthroscopy Association of North America in 2020. He has been listed in “Best Doctors in America” since 2004, “Top Doctor” in the Chicago Metro area by Castle Connolly since 2003, and “The Top 19 U.S Sports Medicine Specialists” in Orthopedics This Week. He was featured on the cover of Chicago Magazine as "Chicago's Top Doctor" in 2006, and in 2009 Cole was awarded NBA Team Physician of the Year.
