= Andy Burgess (rugby league) =

Ireland international rugby league footballer

Personal information
- Full name: Andrew Burgess
- Born: 1 April 1970 (age 55) Salford, Lancashire, England

Playing information
- Position: Second-row, Loose forward
Club
Years	Team	Pld	T	G	FG	P
1987–97	Salford City Reds	184	28	5	0	122
1999	Rochdale Hornets
	Total	184	28	5	0	122
Representative
Years	Team	Pld	T	G	FG	P
1991	Great Britain U-21	1	0	0	0	0
1996–98	Ireland	4

Andrew Burgess (born 1 April 1970) is a former professional rugby league footballer who played in the 1980s and 1990s. He played at representative level for Ireland, and at club level for the Salford City Reds and the Rochdale Hornets, as a second-row or loose forward. As of 2017, he coaches rugby union for Fylde R.U.F.C. (Under-15's) and from 2019-2020 season plays for Fylde Vandals

== Background ==
Andy Burgess was born in Salford, Lancashire, England.

== Playing career ==
=== Club career ===
Burgess joined his hometown club Salford on his 17th birthday on 1 April 1987. He spent ten years at the club, appearing in 184 games.

Andy Burgess played loose forward in Salford's 24–18 defeat by Widnes in the 1990 Lancashire Cup Final during the 1990–91 season at Central Park, Wigan on Saturday 29 September 1990.

=== International honours ===
Andy Burgess won 3 caps for Ireland in 1996–1998 while at Salford City Reds + 1-cap (sub).
