= Hoghton Road Stadium =

Defunct sports stadium in St. Helens, Merseyside, England

Hoghton Road
- Interactive map of Hoghton Road
- Full name: Hoghton Road Stadium
- Location: St. Helens, Merseyside
- Coordinates: 53°26′08.98″N 2°41′41.80″W
- Surface: Grass

Construction
- Opened: 1946
- Closed: 2001

Hoghton Road Stadium was a sports stadium on Hoghton Road, Sutton, a suburb of St. Helens (population approx 100,000), the administrative centre of the Metropolitan Borough of St Helens in Merseyside, England.

== Brief history ==
It was the ground used by St Helens Town A.F.C. from 1946 to 2000 when the club sold the ground and moved into Knowsley Road, the home of St Helens R.F.C.

When the club was founded in 1946, a group of local businessmen purchased the Hoghton Road ground in Sutton for use by the club.

In 2000, the final game was played on Hoghton Road when the Champions elect were beaten 1–0, and St Helens Town A.F.C. relocated to Saints' Knowsley Road. The land was sold to Barratt Homes, for housing development.

== Use by Highfield RLFC ==
In August 1990 Runcorn Highfield signed a 99-year agreement with St Helens Town A.F.C. and moved to Hoghton Road for the 1990–91 season. In the summer of 1991, during the close season, Runcorn Highfield changed their name to plain Highfield. They continued to use the ground until St Helens Town A.F.C. decided to increase the rent on the ground. Highfield moved to Valerie Park in Prescot during the 1994–1995 season and at the start of the 1995–1996 season, they were renamed Prescot Panthers.

A full history of Hoghton Road Stadium appears on http://www.sthelenstownafc.com/ (click links to club history – then Hoghton Road History)

== Greyhound racing ==
A short lived greyhound racing track was opened by the St Helens Greyhound Company. The first meeting was on 2 July 1993 and the increased income helped the club make a profit. The racing was independent (not affiliated to the sports governing body the National Greyhound Racing Club) and was known as a flapping track, which was the nickname given to independent tracks. Despite the rugby team leaving in 2000, the last greyhound meeting was held on 9 October 2001.

== See also ==
- St Helens Town A.F.C.
