= St Helens Town A.F.C. =

Association football club in England

Coordinates: 53°27′38.0″N 2°45′28.2″W

St Helens Town
- Full name: St Helens Town Association Football Club
- Nicknames: Saints; Town; Marksmen
- Founded: 1946
- Ground: Ruskin Drive Sports Ground
- Manager: Paul "Peo" Piert
- League: Cheshire League Premier Division
- 2025–26: Cheshire League League One, 3rd of 16 (promoted)
Home colours	Away colours

St Helens Town Association Football Club is an English Football club based in St. Helens, England. The club are members of the Cheshire Football League, and as from season 2016–17 play their home matches at Ruskin Drive Sports Ground, which they share with local rivals Pilkington.

== History ==
The original St Helens Town was formed in 1901 and played at Park Road, behind the Primrose Vaults public house. Although it was known as the Primrose Ground, the players changed further down Park Road at the Black Horse pub. Playing in the Lancashire League and Lancashire Combination, the team enjoyed some early success, but struggled leading up to the Great War and folded before its end; a second St Helens Town existed from 1925 to 1928.

The club was re-formed by George Fryer and a group of local businessmen in 1946. They took out a lease on the former cricket ground at Hoghton Road, Sutton, adjacent to the St Helens Junction railway station and, although the club entered the FA Cup in the 1946–47 season, a team could not be raised in time to fulfill the tie with Prescot Cables. Friendly games were played, then local team Derbyshire Hill Rovers were taken over in April 1947, those players forming the nucleus of the team which entered the Liverpool County Combination at the start of the 1947–48 season. St Helens Town soon began to prosper and early results included a sensational 1–4 win over Everton "A" on 6 December 1947. Former German prisoner-of-war Bert Trautmann joined the club in the summer of 1948, the strapping goalkeeper helping the team to win its first trophy, the George Mahon Cup, which was secured with a 2–1 win over Runcorn at Prescot on 7 May 1949. Crowds averaged over 2,000 that season, peaking with a league record attendance of 3,102 against Burscough in October 1948.

The following season, 1949–50, Town entered the Lancashire Combination and, despite losing Trautmann to Manchester City in October 1949, they won the Second Division title in some style the following season with three players all netting over 30 goals apiece: Albert Leadbitter (36), Harry McCann (32) and Terry Garner (31). An all-time club record attendance "between 8,000 and 9,000" witnessed a friendly game against Manchester City which was arranged as part of the Trautmann transfer deal in April 1950. Another 4,000 spectators then witnessed a second game contested by the two teams the season after. Although relegated by a slender margin from the First Division in 1951–52, the club continued to look forward, even contemplating Football League status and, in order to further their ambitions, the club moved to the former St Helens Recreation ground at City Road. Initial crowds were encouraging at their new home, but, despite success, Town decided to move back to Hoghton Road in October 1953, where they remained until April 2000.

Following a second relegation in 1956, St Helens Town continued to play in the Lancashire Combination, winning the Championship in 1971–72, by nine points ahead of Accrington Stanley. However, the formation of the Northern Premier League in 1968 led to a gradual drain of stronger clubs from the Combination and St Helens joined the Cheshire League in 1975. Seven years later, Town eventually became founder members of the North West Counties League, and competed in the Premier Division's inaugural season in 1982–83. They held the proud record of being the only club to play in the North West Counties top flight in every season until they were relegated in April 2015 in dramatic fashion, conceding an injury time equaliser to Silsden in the final game of the season in which, if they won, they would have stayed up.

Town enjoyed a golden era in the late 1980s, just missing out on an appearance in the first round proper of the FA Cup in 1985–86, losing to Morecambe in a fourth qualifying round replay. But they obtained ample compensation by winning the FA Vase in 1987, beating near neighbours Warrington Town in the final 3–2 with a Phil Layhe brace and a goal from Brian Rigby. They were regular promotion candidates for many years, largely due to the goalscoring exploits of Steve "Pellet" Pennington, who grabbed 216 goals, his season's best hauls of 45 in 1993–94 and 46 in 1997–98 just fell short of the club record of 47 scored by Phil Stainton in 1963–64.

Soon enough, the facilities at Hoghton Road had fallen into disrepair and the site was sold for housing in 2002. Town, having gone into partnership with St Helens R.F.C., ground-shared Knowsley Road for 10 years, but the intended relocation to the new Langtree Park ground did not materialise. During this period the club had to overcome many financial issues in order to exist, and several managers came and went including Joe Palladino, Paul Lodge, Joe Gillibru, Alex Wright and John Fletcher. The club then embarked on a nomadic existence, first at Ashton Town, then at their neighbours Ashton Athletic. Construction work at the council-owned multi-sports facility at Ruskin Drive had been delayed, but was ultimately completed at the beginning of the 2017–18 season. However, due to problems, home matches during season 2016–17 were played mostly at the ground of Prescot Cables, with the remainder at Ashton Town's ground.

Lee Jenkinson took charge at the beginning of the 2017–18 season and was replaced by David Platt Jr in October 2019 for the ill-fated season that saw the North West Counties League (NWCFL) campaign ultimately declared null and void due to the COVID-19 crisis. Looking to build on its secured stability the club appointed NWCFL Director Gary Langley as chairman for the start of the 2020–21 season.

2022 saw the first team relegated to the Liverpool County Premier League after a disastrous campaign left them bottom of the league by some way. Following this, a consortium, led by local musicians and fans bought the club back from St Helens R.F.C. and appointed Paul "Peo" Piert as first team manager.

After the takeover of the Marksmen, they was in the Liverpool County Premier league and finished bottom of the pile after a complete rebuild of the club following a relegation from the North West Counties Division North which they was founder members of.

The first season in the Liverpool County Premier the club finished bottom of the table and took the decision to relegate themselves further and move over to the Cheshire League Division 2, which they eventually won in there second season. Town are currently in the Cheshire League 1.

== Colours and crest ==
St Helens Town's final colours were red and white. When the club reformed in 1946, the club adopted blue and white striped shirts, with white shorts and socks. Since then, St Helens Town have switched from red and blue being their primary colour on a number of occasions.

Like most of the early English football clubs, the original crest adopted by St Helens Town was that of the borough's coat of arms.

== Former players ==
St Helens Town have produced a number of players who have gone on to join Football League clubs: these include Bill Foulkes (Manchester United), John Quinn (Sheffield Wednesday) and John Connelly who joined Burnley, later transferring to Manchester United and who played in the England 1966 World Cup winning squad.

Town also saw the beginning of Bert Trautmann's career in football. The goalkeeper played a single season with the non-league outfit, including in front of a record 9,000 attendance in the final of the local Mahon Cup, before moving on to Manchester City in 1949. He went on to win the 1956 FA Cup and be inducted into the English Football Hall of Fame in 2005.

More recently Dave Bamber scored goals in all four divisions of the Football League with a host of different clubs, starting and ending his league career with Blackpool and Karl Ledsham is now playing his football at National League level, initially with Southport, before moving on to play for Lincoln City.

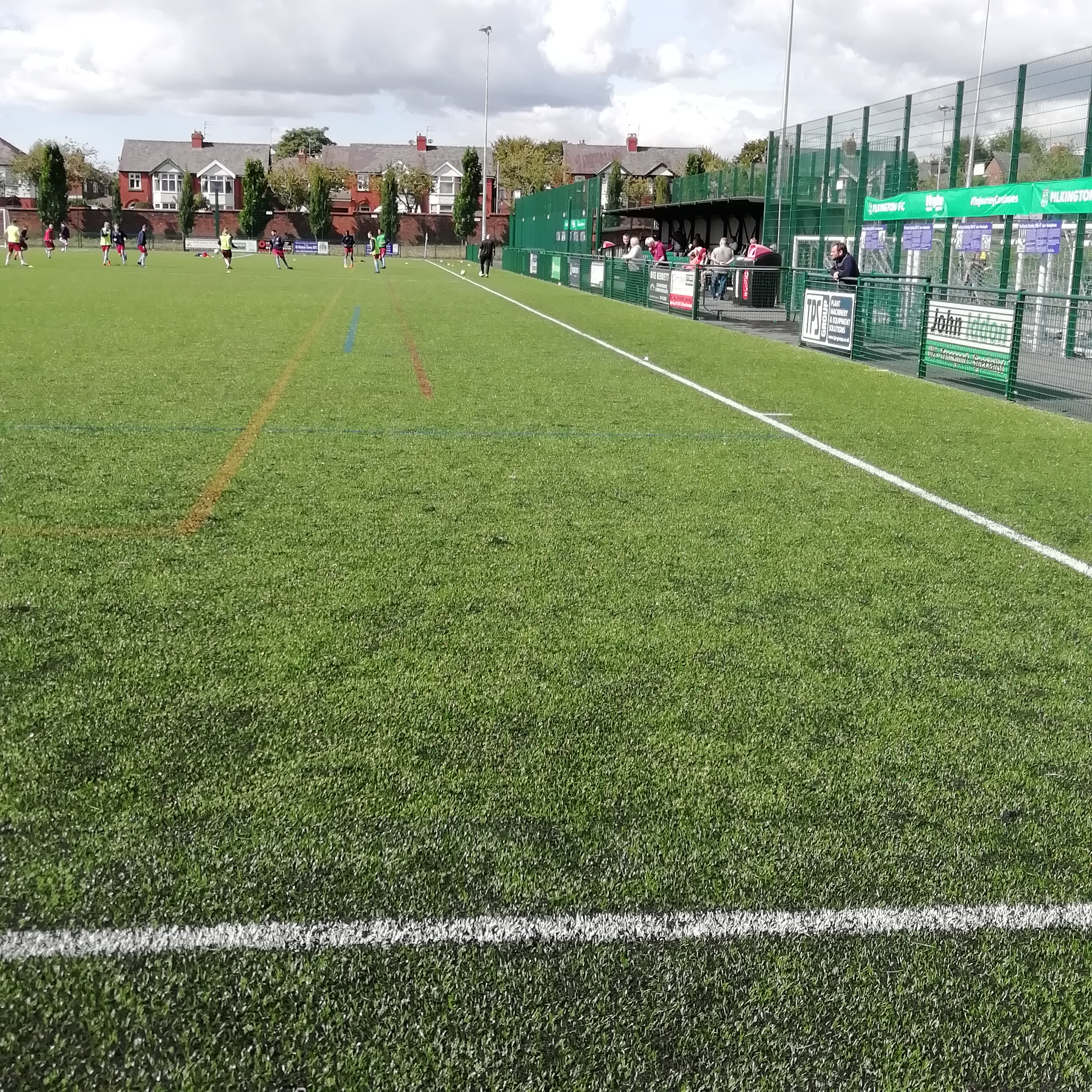
Acroframe Park

== Honours ==
- FA Vase
  - Winners - 1986-87
- Lancashire Combination
  - Winners - 1971-72
- Lancashire Combination Division Two
  - Winners - 1950-51
- Cheshire Association Football League (League 2)
- Winners - 2024-2025

== Records ==
- Record Win: 10–1 vs Wythenshawe Res, Cheshire Football League League One, 18 April 2026
- Heaviest defeat: 0–9 vs New Mills, North West Counties League Premier Division, 12 March 2011
- Best FA Cup performance: Fourth qualifying round replay (1985–86)
- Best FA Trophy performance: Third qualifying round (1977–78); Third qualifying round replay (1969–70, 1979–80)
- Best FA Vase performance: Champions (1986–87)
- Most appearances: Alan Wellens
- Record goalscorer: Steve Pennington
- Highest league position: Third in the North West Counties League Division 1, 1988–89, 1994–95
- Youngest captain: Andrew Mawdsley (aged 19)
