= Saint-Estève XIII Mavericks =

French semi-professional rugby league club

Club information
- Full name: Saint-Estève XIII Mavericks
- Short name: Saint-Estève
- Founded: 1965; 60 years ago (as AS Saint-Estève); Reformed 2000; 25 years ago

Current details
- Ground(s): Stade Municipal (6,000)
- Chairman: Richard Masforne
- Coach: Gregory Simon

Uniforms
Home colours

Saint-Estève XIII Mavericks are a French Rugby league side based in Saint-Estève near Perpignan in the département of Pyrénées-Orientales. Originally known as AS Saint-Estève until 2000, the club was founded in 1965. Home games are played at the Stade Municipal.

== History ==
The club was founded in 1965 as Association Sportive Saint-Estève XIII better known as AS Saint-Estève. For a club of its size the success they had was remarkable their best spell was between 1986 and 2000 when they contested 17 finals winning 8 of them. They played in the 1989 European Club Challenge against English champions Widnes, losing in a lopsided affair. Their best season was 1992-93 when they completed their one and only league and cup double.

In 2000 Bernard Guasch brought Saint Esteve and XIII Catalan together to form Union Treiziste Catalane, better known in the English speaking world by their Super League identity of Catalans Dragons. The aim was to get the new club into the Super League which they did in 2006. A presence in the French Elite One Championship was maintained by firstly the retaining of the name Union Treiziste Catalane and then after a rebranding Saint-Esteve XIII Catalan.

Meanwhile, the youth teams which had been set up in 1968 were maintained under a new name Saint-Estève XIII nicknamed the Mavericks. It was then decided that the Elite One club needed a feeder team so the Mavericks introduced a senior side to go along with their junior sides. Thus a new club was born out of an old club while retaining its own identity

In the 2018–19 season, the club won the Federal championship by defeating Gratentour XIII 23–12 in the final.

The club was dormant during the 2019–20 season, and in June 2020 announced plans to restart as Saint-Estève XIII Riberal for the 2020–21 season. The club were scheduled to play in Pool E of the Federal Division, but in October 2020 the season was cancelled.

== Stadium ==
Saint-Estève play at the Stade Municipal which is a stadium used for rugby. It has floodlights and a main stand with 2,000 seats. In 2015 it hosted France A match against the Serbia national rugby league team. The stadium is also used by Saint-Estève XIII Catalan in the French Elite One Championship.

== Notable players ==
- Jean-Marc Garcia
- Jerome Guisset

== Honours ==
As AS Saint-Estève

- French Championship (6): 1970–71, 1988–89, 1989–90, 1992–93, 1996–97, 1997–98
- Lord Derby Cup (4): 1972, 1993, 1994, 1995

As Saint-Estève XIII Mavericks

- Federal Division : 2018–19

== See also ==
- French Championship
- Lord Derby Cup
- France National Rugby League Team
