= Brian Coles =

France international rugby league footballer

Personal information
- Born: 1964 (age 61–62) Australia

Playing information
- Position: Wing
Representative
Years	Team	Pld	T	G	FG	P
1995	France	4	1	0	0	4

Brian Coles (born 1964) is a French-Australian former rugby league football player.

A product of the Penrith Panthers' junior program, Coles moved to France in 1988 and settled in the domestic club competition, earning recognition as a polyvalent player. He subsequently married and had his first daughter, Lucy Coles with his French wife. Later in 2008 he had his second daughter Charlie Coles.

Coles, who had previously played lock for the President's XIII, a French championship selects team, against the Australian Kangaroos. received his first selection with the French national team on the occasion of a March 1995 European Championship game against Wales. He was then selected for the tour of New Zealand, playing in the second test in Palmerston North, scoring the first try in the 16 all draw. Later that year, he represented France at the World Cupplaying in both matches against Wales and Samoa. Alongside fellow Australian John Elias, Coles was part of Team France's staff during the 2017 World Cup, working as the teams Media manager which took place in Australia.
