= 1987 Manly-Warringah Sea Eagles season =

- NSWRL champions
- NSWRL rank: 1st
- 1987 record: Wins: 20; draws: 1; losses: 5
- Points scored: For: 581; against: 370

Team information
- Secretary: (Australia) Doug Daley
- Coach: (Australia) Bob Fulton
- Assistant coach: (Australia) Alan Thompson (Reserve Grade)
- Captains: (Australia) Paul Vautin; (Australia) Noel Cleal (vice-captain)
- Stadium: Brookvale Oval

Top scorers
- Tries: (Australia) Dale Shearer (13)
- Goals: (Australia) Mal Cochrane (59)
- Points: (Australia) Mal Cochrane (138)
| ← 1986 | 1988 → |

The 1987 Manly-Warringah Sea Eagles season was the 41st in the club's history since their entry into the then New South Wales Rugby Football League premiership in 1947.

The 1987 Sea Eagles were coached by triple Manly premiership player and former Kangaroo Tour captain Bob Fulton. Captaining the side was Queensland back rower Paul Vautin. The club competed in the New South Wales Rugby League's 1987 Premiership season and played its home games at the 27,000 capacity Brookvale Oval.

== Ladder ==
| | Team | Pld | W | D | L | B | PF | PA | PD | Pts |
|---|---|---|---|---|---|---|---|---|---|---|
| 1 | Manly-Warringah | 24 | 18 | 1 | 5 | 2 | 553 | 356 | +197 | 41 |
| 2 | Eastern Suburbs | 24 | 15 | 1 | 8 | 2 | 390 | 353 | +37 | 35 |
| 3 | Canberra | 24 | 15 | 0 | 9 | 2 | 441 | 325 | +116 | 34 |
| 4 | Balmain | 24 | 14 | 1 | 9 | 2 | 469 | 349 | +120 | 33 |
| 5 | South Sydney | 24 | 13 | 1 | 10 | 2 | 310 | 342 | -32 | 31 |
| 6 | Canterbury-Bankstown | 24 | 13 | 0 | 11 | 2 | 353 | 316 | +37 | 30 |
| 7 | Parramatta | 24 | 12 | 0 | 12 | 2 | 417 | 411 | +6 | 28 |
| 8 | Cronulla-Sutherland | 24 | 11 | 1 | 12 | 2 | 390 | 433 | -43 | 27 |
| 9 | St. George | 24 | 10 | 2 | 12 | 2 | 394 | 409 | -15 | 26 |
| 10 | North Sydney | 24 | 11 | 0 | 13 | 2 | 368 | 401 | -33 | 26 |
| 11 | Illawarra | 24 | 8 | 0 | 16 | 2 | 372 | 449 | -77 | 20 |
| 12 | Penrith | 24 | 6 | 1 | 17 | 2 | 274 | 399 | -125 | 17 |
| 13 | Western Suburbs | 24 | 5 | 2 | 17 | 2 | 339 | 527 | -188 | 16 |

== Regular season ==
| Sunday 1 March | St. George Dragons | 4 – 4 | Manly-Warringah Sea Eagles | Belmore Sports Ground, Sydney |
| | Tries: Goals: Bronko Djura (2/3) | [ Report] | Tries: Goals: Mal Cochrane (2/2) | Attendance: 10,650; Referee: Giles O'Donnell |

| Sunday 8 March | Manly-Warringah Sea Eagles | 42 – 18 | Penrith Panthers | Brookvale Oval, Sydney |
| | Tries: Dale Shearer (3), Mal Cochrane, Des Hasler, Martin Meredith, David Ronson; Goals: Mal Cochrane (6/9); Michael O'Connor (1/1) | [ Report] | Tries: Craig Connor, Ben Gonzales, Matt Goodwin; Goals: Mark Bevan (3/3) | Attendance: 6,374; Referee: Graham Annesley |

| Sunday 15 March | Western Suburbs Magpies | 11 – 22 | Manly-Warringah Sea Eagles | Orana Park, Sydney |
| | Tries: John Allanson; Goals: Ian Schubert (3/6) | [ Report] | Tries: Des Hasler, Michael O'Connor, David Ronson, Dale Shearer; Goals: Mal Cochrane (3/5) | Attendance: 8,822; Referee: Mick Stone |

| Sunday 22 March | Manly-Warringah Sea Eagles | 16 – 13 | Parramatta Eels | Brookvale Oval, Sydney |
| | Tries: Ian Barkley, Mal Cochrane, Des Hasler, Steve Park; Goals: Michael O'Connor (2/3); Mal Cochrane (1/3) | [ Report] | Tries: Goals: John Muggleton (2/2) | Attendance: 17,757; Referee: Mick Stone |

Bye

| Sunday 5 April | Canterbury-Bankstown Bulldogs | 18 – 6 | Manly-Warringah Sea Eagles | Belmore Sports Ground, Sydney |
| | Tries: Michael Hagan, Steve Mortimer; Goals: Terry Lamb (5/6) | [ Report] | Tries: Jeremy Ticehurst; Goals: Mal Cochrane (1/3) | Attendance: 13,553; Referee: Mick Stone |

| Sunday 12 April | Manly-Warringah Sea Eagles | 18 – 28 | South Sydney Rabbitohs | Brookvale Oval, Sydney |
| | Tries: Ian Barkley, Cliff Lyons, Michael O'Connor; Goals: Michael O'Connor (3/4) | [ Report] | Tries: David Boyle, Wayne Chisholm, Mario Fenech, Steve Mavin, Ian Roberts; Goals: Michael Andrews (4/7) | Attendance: 14,601; Referee: Graham Annesley |

| Monday 20 April | Cronulla-Sutherland Sharks | 18 – 13 | Manly-Warringah Sea Eagles | Caltex Field, Sydney |
| | Tries: Greg Nixon, Ron Quinn, Sean Watson; Goals: Sean Watson (3/7) | [ Report] | Tries: Des Hasler, Dale Shearer; Goals: Michael O'Connor (2/3); Field Goals: Cliff Lyons (1) | Attendance: 10,931; Referee: Bill Harrigan |

| Saturday 25 April | Manly-Warringah Sea Eagles | 18 – 10 | Eastern Suburbs Roosters | Brookvale Oval, Sydney |
| | Tries: Chris Close, Mark Pocock, Paul Vautin; Goals: Mal Cochrane (3/4) | [ Report] | Tries: Wayne Portlock; Goals: Tony Melrose (3/4) | Attendance: 10,247; Referee: Mick Stone |

| Saturday 2 May | Canberra Raiders | 10 – 18 | Manly-Warringah Sea Eagles | Seiffert Oval, Queanbeyan |
| | Tries: Sam Backo, Ashley Gilbert; Goals: Phil Carey (1/2) | [ Report] | Tries: Greg Austin, Noel Cleal, Cliff Lyons; Goals: Mal Cochrane (3/4) | Attendance: 4,885; Referee: Greg McCallum |

| Sunday 10 May | Manly-Warringah Sea Eagles | 22 – 12 | Illawarra Steelers | Brookvale Oval, Sydney |
| | Tries: Stuart Davis (2), Dale Shearer, Jeremy Ticehurst; Goals: Mal Cochrane (3/6) | [ Report] | Tries: Graeme Bradley, Perry Haddock; Goals: Dean Carney (2/4) | Attendance: 7,053; Referee: Kevin Roberts |

| Sunday 17 May | North Sydney Bears | 22 – 30 | Manly-Warringah Sea Eagles | North Sydney Oval, Sydney |
| | Tries: Mark Cannon, Greg Florimo, Ian French; Goals: John Dorahy (5/5) | [ Report] | Tries: Noel Cleal (2), Ian Barkley, Dale Shearer; Goals: Mal Cochrane (7/7) | Attendance: 11,391; Referee: Greg McCallum |

| Sunday 24 May | Manly-Warringah Sea Eagles | 48 – 14 | Balmain Tigers | Brookvale Oval, Sydney |
| | Tries: Darrell Williams (3), Ron Gibbs (2), Mal Cochrane, Stuart Davis, Michael O'Connor, David Ronson; Goals: Mal Cochrane (6/9) | [ Report] | Tries: Benny Elias, Russel Gartner; Goals: Lee Crooks (3/3) | Attendance: 25,448; Referee: Kevin Roberts |

| Sunday 7 June | Manly-Warringah Sea Eagles | 20 – 6 | St. George Dragons | Brookvale Oval, Sydney |
| | Tries: Des Hasler, Dale Shearer, Darrell Williams; Goals: Mal Cochrane (3/6); Michael O'Connor (1/1) | [ Report] | Tries: Graeme Wynn; Goals: Ricky Walford (1/2) | Attendance: 12,041; Referee: Mick Stone |

| Sunday 14 June | Penrith Panthers | 10 – 12 | Manly-Warringah Sea Eagles | Penrith Park, Sydney |
| | Tries: Mark Robinson; Goals: Andrew Fitzhenry (3/4) | [ Report] | Tries: Stuart Davis; Goals: Mal Cochrane (4/4) | Attendance: Barry Barnes; Referee: 8,287 |

| Sunday 21 June | Manly-Warringah Sea Eagles | 26 – 25 | Western Suburbs Magpies | Brookvale Oval, Sydney |
| | Tries: Stuart Davis (2), Cliff Lyons, Michael O'Connor, David Ronson; Goals: Mal Cochrane (3/7) | [ Report] | Tries: John Allanson, Trevor Cogger, Ian Naden, Paul Sheahan; Goals: Ian Schubert (3/6); Hew Rees (1/1); Field Goals: Ian Naden (1) | Attendance: 10,732; Referee: Bill Harrigan |

| Sunday 28 June | Parramatta Eels | 22 – 30 | Manly-Warringah Sea Eagles | Parramatta Stadium, Sydney |
| | Tries: Tony Chalmers, Michael Erickson, Brett Kenny, Bob Lindner, John Muggleton; Goals: John Muggleton (1/5) | [ Report] | Tries: Dale Shearer (2), Des Hasler, Cliff Lyons, Michael O'Connor, David Ronson; Goals: Michael O'Connor (3/6) | Attendance: 25,139; Referee: Kevin Roberts |

Bye

| Sunday 12 July | Manly-Warringah Sea Eagles | 32 – 2 | Canterbury-Bankstown Bulldogs | Brookvale Oval, Sydney |
| | Tries: Greg Austin, Noel Cleal, Ron Gibbs, Des Hasler, Martin Meredith; Goals: Mal Cochrane (6/8) | [ Report] | Tries: Goals: Terry Lamb (1/2) | Attendance: 16,252; Referee: Greg McCallum |

| Sunday 19 July | South Sydney Rabbitohs | 13 – 16 | Manly-Warringah Sea Eagles | Redfern Oval, Sydney |
| | Tries: Craig Coleman, Steve Mavin; Goals: Mark Ellison (2/3); Field Goals: Mark Ellison (1) | [ Report] | Tries: Ron Gibbs, Cliff Lyons; Goals: Mal Cochrane (4/6) | Attendance: 23,257; Referee: Mick Stone |

| Sunday 26 July | Manly-Warringah Sea Eagles | 30 – 8 | Cronulla-Sutherland Sharks | Brookvale Oval, Sydney |
| | Tries: Michael O'Connor (2), Dale Shearer (2), Mal Cochrane, Stuart Davis; Goals: Michael O'Connor (3/6) | [ Report] | Tries: Jonathan Docking; Goals: Sean Watson (1/3); Alan Wilson (1/1) | Attendance: 14,323; Referee: Graham Annesley |

| Sunday 2 August | Eastern Suburbs Roosters | 26 – 16 | Manly-Warringah Sea Eagles | Henson Park, Sydney |
| | Tries: Steve Morris (2), Brendan Hall, David Smith; Goals: David Smith (5/5) | [ Report] | Tries: Noel Cleal, Michael O'Connor, Darrell Williams; Goals: Michael O'Connor (2/3) | Attendance: 6,573; Referee: Graham Annesley |

| Sunday 9 August | Manly-Warringah Sea Eagles | 20 – 18 | Canberra Raiders | Brookvale Oval, Sydney |
| | Tries: Mal Cochrane, Martin Meredith, Kevin Ward; Goals: Mal Cochrane (4/5) | [ Report] | Tries: Sam Backo, Ashley Gilbert, Kevin Walters; Goals: Matthew Corkery (3/5) | Attendance: 9,114; Referee: Bill Harrigan |

| Sunday 16 August | Illawarra Steelers | 17 – 28 | Manly-Warringah Sea Eagles | Wollongong Showground, Wollongong |
| | Tries: Steve Larder (2), Graeme Bradley; Goals: Dean Carney (2/5); Field Goals: Chris Withall (1) | [ Report] | Tries: Noel Cleal (2), Paul Shaw, Michael O'Connor; Goals: Michael O'Connor (4/4) | Attendance: 10,740; Referee: Giles O'Donnell |

| Sunday 23 August | Manly-Warringah Sea Eagles | 30 – 32 | North Sydney Bears | Brookvale Oval, Sydney |
| | Tries: Stuart Davis, Michael O'Connor, David Ronson, Dale Shearer, Martin Meredith; Goals: Michael O'Connor (5/7) | [ Report] | Tries: Mark Cannon (2), John McArthur (2), Ian French, Kevin Marr; Goals: John McArthur (4/7) | Attendance: 13,913; Referee: Bill Harrigan |

| Sunday 30 August | Balmain Tigers | 8 – 26 | Manly-Warringah Sea Eagles | Leichhardt Oval, Sydney |
| | Tries: John Davidson, Garry Schofield; Goals: | [ Report] | Tries: Des Hasler (2), Cliff Lyons, David Ronson; Goals: Michael O'Connor (5/5) | Attendance: 13,557; Referee: Graham Annesley |

== Finals ==
=== Major Semi-Final ===
| Sunday 3 September | Manly-Warringah Sea Eagles | 10 – 6 | Eastern Suburbs Roosters | Sydney Cricket Ground, Sydney |
| | Tries: David Ronson; Goals: Michael O'Connor (3/3) | [ Report] | Tries: David French; Goals: David Smith (1/2) | Attendance: 36,399; Referee: Greg McCallum |

=== Grand final ===
Sunday 27 September

| Manly-Warringah Sea Eagles | 18 – 8 | Canberra Raiders |
|---|---|---|
| Tries: Cliff Lyons; Michael O'Connor; Goals: Michael O'Connor (5/5) | | Tries: Chris O'Sullivan Goals: Mal Meninga (1/1); Gary Belcher (1/1) |

Sydney Cricket Ground, Sydney
Attendance: 50,201
Referee: Mick Stone
Player of the Match: Cliff Lyons

| Manly-Warringah | Canberra |

| FB | 1 | Dale Shearer |
| RW | 2 | David Ronson |
| CE | 3 | Darrell Williams |
| CE | 4 | Michael O'Connor |
| LW | 5 | Stuart Davis |
| FE | 6 | Cliff Lyons |
| HB | 7 | Des Hasler |
| LK | 8 | Paul Vautin (c) |
| SR | 9 | Noel Cleal |
| SR | 10 | Ron Gibbs |
| PR | 11 | Kevin Ward |
| HK | 12 | Mal Cochrane |
| PR | 13 | Phil Daley |
Substitutions:
| IC | 20 | Paul Shaw |
| IC | 24 | Mark Pocock |
Coach:
(Australia) Bob Fulton

| FB | 1 | Gary Belcher |
| RW | 2 | Chris Kinna |
| CE | 3 | Mal Meninga |
| CE | 4 | Peter Jackson |
| LW | 5 | Matthew Corkery |
| FE | 6 | Chris O'Sullivan |
| HB | 7 | Ivan Henjak |
| LK | 8 | Dean Lance (c) |
| SR | 9 | Gary Coyne |
| SR | 10 | Ashley Gilbert |
| PR | 11 | Sam Backo |
| HK | 12 | Steve Walters |
| PR | 13 | Brent Todd |
Substitutions:
| IC | 14 | Kevin Walters |
| IC | 15 | Terry Regan |
Coach:
(Australia) Don Furner and Wayne Bennett

From the outset Manly's Cliff Lyons attempted to find gaps out wide in Canberra's defence and kept the Raiders hemmed in on their own side of half-way with his astute kicking. Lyons stepped inside the Raiders' defence and after a seventy-metre burst found Noel Cleal stampeding on to the ball but Cleal's final pass to Des Hasler was ruled forward. Another promising Manly raid broke down after Lyons had initially dummied to O'Connor, then proceeded to run around Peter Jackson and head 30 metres downfield. It all came to naught however when Lyons' reverse pass to O'Connor was put to ground after O'Connor had thought Lyons would dummy to him again, with Lyons actually having what TV replays showed to be an unimpeded run to the try line had he looked ahead and not tried to pass.

Manly continued to put pressure on the Raiders defence with both speedsters Michael O'Connor and Dale Shearer trying to catch the Raiders out with long range kicks to their in-goal area in front of the SCG hill, but both were only just beaten to the ball each time by Gary Belcher and Gary Coyne respectively.

In the 27th minute Lyons eventually broke through on his third threatening attempt. Scurrying from a scrum win on the Canberra quarter-line, Lyons brushed off the tackle of Chris O'Sullivan and stepped inside Belcher to score.

The Sea Eagles led 6–0 at half-time though it could have been much greater had they taken advantage of the opportunities Cliff Lyons had been creating. Other than the Lyons try, the closest Manly actually got to scoring again in the first half ended with a ball-and-all tackle by Belcher on Dale Shearer just two metres from the Canberra try line. For their part, Canberra rarely threatened the Manly line with a midfield break by Mal Meninga stopped by a good Des Hasler tackle, while Shearer repaid his opposite when he took down Belcher who had taken an inside pass from a Peter Jackson break.

From the second half restart kick-off, Belcher fielded the ball in his in-goal but was penalised for shepherding behind Chris O'Sullivan as he ran the ball out. It was a gift penalty for O'Connor to take Manly out to an 8–0 lead.

The Sea Eagles kept the pressure on Canberra by charging down two attempted clearing kicks by a tiring Mal Meninga. Only occasionally did the Raiders break through. After a run by Peter Jackson, Manly's Phil Daley was penalised for a high tackle and Meninga's goal finally put Canberra on the scoreboard.

Fatigue and the heat began to take a toll on the players, though one of the more surprising efforts was Manly's English prop Kevin Ward who ran and tackled strongly all day. Meninga, who had only played 60 minutes of football since breaking his arm in a game against Manly almost two months earlier, was replaced by Kevin Walters after 15 minutes of the second half and Manly's Gibbs, Cleal and Cochrane all went down hurt at different stages as the pace of the match slowed (for his part, Cochrane still can not remember the second half). Soon after a successful penalty goal from O'Connor, a Dale Shearer cross field kick from the Raiders 22m line was grounded over the line by O'Connor in the Paddington corner. While Manly winger David Ronson was thought to be offside (though he did not get involved in the play, he was still within 10 metres of O'Connor), many claim that the Manly centre should have been ruled offside as he got the ball "rather quickly" (Ch.10's television replays would prove inconclusive, however a wider shot shown on the ABC showed that O'Connor was actually onside). However, what counted was that referee Mick Stone ruled that Manly's international centre was onside and O'Connor was awarded the try. He converted his own try (giving him 4/4 goals at that point) and Manly had a premiership winning 16–2 lead.

A brief hope of a fightback loomed after an ingeniously constructed "trojan horse" move by Canberra. Chris O'Sullivan went down "injured" after being tackled and then miraculously popped up in the next passage of play to take the inside pass from Ivan Henjak and score. With Meninga off the ground, Gary Belcher converted to narrow the scores to 16–8.

Ron Gibbs' return from the head-bin helped snap the Sea Eagles out of their complacency. Daley's tackle on Canberra replacement Terry Regan and Dale Shearer's try-saving tackle on Ashley Gilbert three minutes from full-time ended any chance of a Canberra fightback. Paul Vautin led the charge back up-field with Hasler being bundled into the corner post after a run-around movement with O'Connor. The Manly centre also had a try taken off him just minutes after his previous try when Mick Stone ruled a pass from Cliff Lyons had gone forward.

Right on full-time, O'Connor landed his fifth goal from five attempts after the Raiders were penalised in front of their own posts for being offside after a tap-kick restart. The 18–8 scoreline was a fair indication of Manly's supremacy on the day and a just result considering the Sea Eagles' consistency throughout the year.

Manly became the first team other than Canterbury-Bankstown or Parramatta to win the grand final during the 1980s (Manly had been beaten grand finalists in 1982 and 1983, losing both times to Parramatta).

Manly centre Darrell Williams became the first ever New Zealander to win the Sydney Premiership, while Paul Vautin became the first, and so far only Queenslander to captain the Sea Eagles to a winning Grand Final.

For Manly coach Bob Fulton, the premiership was his first in nine years as a coach. Canberra co-coach Don Furner had brought the club into the competition in 1982. Furner, a member of the 1956–57 Kangaroo tour, had coached in the Sydney Premiership since taking charge of Easts in 1970 and led the club to the 1972 Grand Final, where it lost to Manly. He later coached the undefeated 1986 Kangaroo Tour team. Canberra's other co-coach, Wayne Bennett, subsequently became coach of the Brisbane Broncos and continued as Queensland's State of Origin coach.

== 1987 World Club Challenge ==
1987 saw the second World Club Challenge game between the reigning New South Wales Rugby League premiers and the reigning Rugby Football League (England) champions. This game was held in England less than two weeks following the 1987 NSWRL grand final.

The match was played at 7:45pm on a dry Wednesday night, 7 October at the Central Park ground in Wigan. A crowd of 36,895 was in attendance for the game, though unofficial estimates from those present put the attendance as high as 50,000. The game was refereed by RFL international referee John Holdsworth. Former four-time Manly premiership winning Fullback Graham Eadie, who at the time was playing in England with 1987 Challenge Cup winners Halifax, was on hand as a match commentator as was dual Manly premiership player (and captain of the 1978 team) and the skipper of the 1982 Invincibles, Max Krilich.

Wednesday, 7 October

| Wigan | 8 – 2 | Manly-Warringah Sea Eagles |
|---|---|---|
| Tries: Goals: David Stephenson (4) | | Tries: Goals: Michael O'Connor (1) |

Central Park, Wigan
Attendance: 36,895
Referee: John Holdsworth (England)
Player of the Match: Shaun Wane

| Wigan | Manly-Warringah |

| FB | 1 | Steve Hampson |
| RW | 2 | Richard Russell |
| CE | 3 | Darrell Williams |
| CE | 4 | Joe Lydon |
| LW | 5 | Henderson Gill |
| SO | 6 | Shaun Edwards |
| SH | 7 | Andy Gregory |
| PR | 8 | Brian Case |
| HK | 9 | Nicky Kiss |
| PR | 10 | Shaun Wane |
| SR | 11 | Andy Goodway |
| SR | 12 | Ian Potter |
| LF | 13 | Ellery Hanley (c) |
Substitutions:
| IC | 14 | Ged Byrne |
| IC | 15 | Graeme West |
| IC | 16 | Ian Gildart |
| IC | 17 | Ian Lucas |
Coach:
(New Zealand) Graham Lowe

| FB | 1 | Dale Shearer |
| RW | 2 | David Ronson |
| CE | 3 | Darrell Williams |
| CE | 4 | Michael O'Connor |
| LW | 5 | Stuart Davis |
| FE | 6 | Cliff Lyons |
| HB | 7 | Des Hasler |
| LK | 8 | Paul Vautin (c) |
| SR | 9 | Owen Cunningham |
| SR | 10 | Ron Gibbs |
| PR | 11 | Ian Gately |
| HK | 12 | Mal Cochrane |
| PR | 13 | Phil Daley |
Substitutions:
| IC | 14 | Mark Brokenshire |
| IC | 15 | Jeremy Ticehurst |
| IC | 16 | Mark Pocock |
| IC | 17 | Paul Shaw |
Coach:
(Australia) Bob Fulton

No tries were scored in what was a closely fought and, at times, spiteful encounter. Michael O'Connor opened the scoring for Manly with a successful penalty kick in only the second minute, which would turn out to be the only time the Sea Eagles scored. Tempers flared as the match went on, punctuated by more penalties and a few unsavoury incidents:

- Manly forward Ron Gibbs became the first person to be sent off in a World Club Challenge match for illegal use of the elbow when taking out Joe Lydon high after he attempted a drop-goal;
- An all-in brawl erupted after Dale Shearer was lifted in a tackle then started a punch-up in the ruck with Brian Case;
- After taking Manly captain Paul Vautin over the touchline, a group of Wigan defenders went on to take him over the fence causing another all-in brawl;
- Later, when Shearer brought down Lydon in defence, he appeared to step on the Great Britain international's head as he got up after making the tackle.

Amongst all of these incidents Wigan's David Stephenson kicked four penalty goals, which in the end would prove decisive. The score was 8 - 2 in favour of the home side as the final whistle blew, prompting the overjoyed Wigan supporters to flood onto the field to celebrate with the players.

In his biography The Strife and Times of Paul Vautin written by Mike Coleman and released in 1992, the Manly captain told that the Sea Eagles players were so convinced that they would beat Wigan after their grand final win over the Canberra Raiders and after the undefeated 1986 Kangaroo Tour, that they treated the trip to England more as a holiday than anything serious and continued celebrating their GF win while there. Vautin and the other Manly players believe that their poor attitude is what ultimately cost them the game. Wigan on the other hand, led by their Kiwi coach Graham Lowe and featuring 11 Great Britain and one New Zealand international (compared to 5 Australian and one New Zealand international for Manly), took the game very seriously with pride their main motivation after the Great Britain Lions had been humiliated by the Australian's with 4 straight 3-0 Ashes series losses since the disastrous 1979 Australasian tour and the popular belief that the NSWRL Premiership was superior to the RFL's.

In a twist, after leading Wigan to numerous cup titles over the next two seasons, Graham Lowe would become Manly's head coach from 1990 to 1992.

== Player statistics ==
Note: Games and (sub) show total games played, e.g. 1 (1) is 2 games played. List does not include World Club Challenge.

| Player | Games (sub) | Tries | Goals | FG | Points |
|---|---|---|---|---|---|
| (Australia) Greg Austin | 1 (3) | 2 | | | 8 |
| (Australia) Ian Barkley | 11 (1) | 4 | | | 16 |
| (Australia) Mark Brokenshire | 12 | | | | |
| (Australia) Noel Cleal (vc) | 14 (1) | 7 | | | 28 |
| (Australia) Chris Close | 8 (2) | 1 | | | 4 |
| (Australia) Mal Cochrane | 25 | 5 | 59/92 | | 138 |
| (Australia) Mitchell Cox | (2) | | | | |
| (Australia) Peter Cullum | (3) | | | | |
| (Australia) Owen Cunningham | 4 (2) | | | | |
| (Australia) Phil Daley | 18 | | | | |
| (Australia) Stuart Davis | 15 (1) | 8 | | | 32 |
| (Australia) Ian Gately | 4 (3) | | | | |
| (Australia) Ron Gibbs | 26 | 4 | | | 16 |
| (Australia) Marty Gurr | 3 (1) | | | | |
| (Australia) Charlie Haggett | (1) | | | | |
| (Australia) Des Hasler | 24 | 9 | | | 36 |
| (Australia) Matthew Loft | (1) | | | | |
| (Australia) Cliff Lyons | 21 (1) | 7 | | 1 | 29 |
| (Australia) Martin Meredith | 7 (4) | 3 | | | 12 |
| (Australia) Michael O'Connor | 21 | 11 | 39/51 | | 122 |
| (Australia) Steve Park | 7 | 1 | | | 4 |
| (Australia) Mark Pocock | 6 (12) | 1 | | | 4 |
| (Australia) David Ronson | 22 (2) | 8 | | | 32 |
| (Australia) Glenn Ryan | (3) | | | | |
| (Australia) Paul Shaw | 2 (9) | 2 | | | 8 |
| (Australia) Dale Shearer | 20 | 13 | | | 52 |
| (Australia) Jeremy Ticehurst | 9 (4) | 3 | | | 12 |
| (Australia) Paul Vautin (c) | 23 | 1 | | | 4 |
| (England) Kevin Ward | 11 | 1 | | | 4 |
| (New Zealand) Darrell Williams | 22 | 5 | | | 20 |
| TOTAL | | 96 | 98/143 | 1 | 581 |

== Representative Players ==
=== International ===
- Australia – Michael O'Connor, Dale Shearer
- New Zealand – Darrell Williams

=== State ===
- New South Wales – Noel Cleal, Phil Daley, Des Hasler, Cliff Lyons, Michael O'Connor
- Queensland – Dale Shearer, Paul Vautin

=== City vs Country ===
- City Origin – Des Hasler, Michael O'Connor
- City Firsts – Phil Daley
- City Seconds – Mark Brokenshire
- Country Origin – Noel Cleal, Mal Cochrane, Ron Gibbs
