= 1987 World Club Challenge =

Intercontinental rugby league match

1987 Foster's World Club Challenge
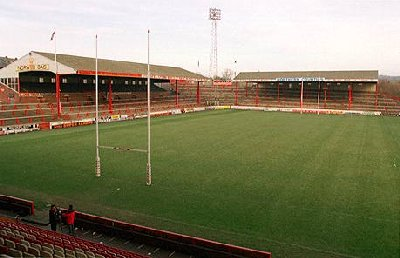
- Central Park hosted the match
| Wigan | Manly-Warringah |
|---|---|
| (RFL) | (NSWRL) |
| 8 | 2 |
| | 1 | 2 | Total |
|---|---|---|---|
| WIG | 4 | 4 | 8 |
| MAN | 2 | 0 | 2 |
- Date: 7 October 1987
- Stadium: Central Park
- Location: Wigan, England
- Man of the Match: Shaun Wane
- Referee: John Holdsworth (England)
- Attendance: 36,895

Broadcast partners
- Broadcasters: BBC (United Kingdom); Network Ten (Australia)
- Commentators: Ray French (BBC); Alex Murphy (BBC); David Fordham (Ten); Graham Eadie (Ten); Max Krilich (Ten)

The 1987 World Club Challenge (also known as the 1987 Foster's World Club Challenge due to sponsorship by brewers, Foster's) was the second game of its kind to be played between Britain's and Australia's domestic rugby league champion clubs. Chairman of Britain's 1986–87 Rugby Football League season champions Wigan, Maurice Lindsay, invited Australia's 1987 NSWRL season premiers, the Manly-Warringah Sea Eagles to Wigan for the game. Originally, Australian Rugby League boss and former long-time Manly club secretary Ken Arthurson proposed that regardless of the outcome, the prize money should be split evenly between the two clubs. However, Wigan chairman Maurice Lindsay convinced Arthurson and the Manly club that it should be "winner takes all" as it would give the players even more incentive to take the game seriously if there was a bigger money pool for the winners. After this memorable match, the World Club Challenge was decided to be made an official annual feature on the rugby league calendar.

== Background ==
=== Wigan ===
The 1986–87 Rugby Football League season was the 105th in the history of English club Wigan. Coached by Graham Lowe and captained by Ellery Hanley, they finished at the top of the 1986–87 Rugby Football League to claim the RFL Championship. They had also won the 1986–87 John Player Special Trophy. By the time of the 1987 World Club Challenge Wigan had already begun playing in the 1987–88 Rugby Football League season.

=== Manly-Warringah Sea Eagles ===
The 1987 NSWRL season was the 41st in the history of Australian club the Manly-Warringah Sea Eagles. Coached by Bob Fulton and captained by Paul Vautin, they finished the regular season as minor premiers, then went on to win the 1987 NSWRL Grand Final against the Canberra Raiders on 27 September 1987 to claim the Premiership.

== Match details ==
The match was played at 7:45pm on a dry Wednesday night, 7 October at the Central Park ground in Wigan. A crowd of 36,895 was in attendance for the game, though unofficial estimates from those present put the attendance as high as 50,000. The game was refereed by RFL international referee John Holdsworth. Former four-time Manly premiership winning Fullback Graham Eadie, who at the time was playing in England with 1987 Challenge Cup winners Halifax, was on hand as a match commentator as was dual Manly premiership player (and captain of the 1978 team) and the skipper of the 1982 Invincibles, Max Krilich.

Wednesday 7 October

| Wigan | 8 – 2 | Manly-Warringah Sea Eagles |
|---|---|---|
| Tries: Goals: David Stephenson (4) | | Tries: Goals: Michael O'Connor (1) |

Central Park, Wigan
Attendance: 36,895
Referee: John Holdsworth (England)
Player of the Match: Shaun Wane

| Wigan | Position | Manly-Warringah |
|---|---|---|
| Steve Hampson | Fullback | Dale Shearer |
| Richard Russell | Wing | David Ronson |
| David Stephenson | Centre | Darrell Williams |
| Joe Lydon | Centre | Michael O'Connor |
| Henderson Gill | Wing | Stuart Davis |
| Shaun Edwards | Stand-off | Cliff Lyons |
| Andy Gregory | Scrum-half | Des Hasler |
| Brian Case | Prop | Phil Daley |
| Nicky Kiss | Hooker | Mal Cochrane |
| Shaun Wane | Prop | Ian Gately |
| Andy Goodway | Second-row | Ron Gibbs |
| Ian Potter | Second-row | Owen Cunningham |
| Ellery Hanley (c) | Loose forward | Paul Vautin (c) |
| Ged Byrne | Bench | Mark Brokenshire |
| Graeme West | Bench | Jeremy Ticehurst |
| Ian Gildart | Bench | Mark Pocock |
| Ian Lucas | Bench | Paul Shaw |
| Graham Lowe | Coach | Bob Fulton |

No tries were scored in what was a closely fought and, at times, spiteful encounter. Michael O'Connor opened the scoring for Manly with a successful penalty kick in the second minute, which would turn out to be the only time the Sea Eagles scored. Tempers flared as the match went on, punctuated by more penalties and a few unsavoury incidents:

- Manly forward Ron Gibbs became the first person to be sent off in a World Club Challenge match for illegal use of the elbow when taking out Joe Lydon high after he attempted a drop-goal;
- An all-in brawl erupted after Dale Shearer was lifted in a tackle then started a punch-up in the ruck with Brian Case;
- After taking Manly captain Paul Vautin over the touchline, a group of Wigan defenders went on to take him over the fence causing another all-in brawl;
- Later, when Shearer brought down Lydon in defence, he appeared to step on the Great Britain international's head as he got up after making the tackle.

Amongst all of these incidents Wigan's David Stephenson kicked four penalty goals, which proved decisive. The score was 8-2 in favour of Wigan as the final whistle blew, prompting the Wigan supporters to flood onto the field to celebrate with the players.

Wigan front row forward Shaun Wane was judged as the player of the match.

In his biography The Strife and Times of Paul Vautin written by Mike Coleman and released in 1992, the Manly captain told that the Sea Eagles players were so convinced that they would beat Wigan after their Grand Final win over the Canberra Raiders and after the undefeated 1986 Kangaroo Tour, that they treated the trip to England more as a holiday than anything serious and continued celebrating their Grand Final win while there. Vautin and the other Manly players believe that their poor attitude is what ultimately cost them the game. Wigan on the other hand, led by their Kiwi coach Graham Lowe and captain Ellery Hanley and featuring 11 Great Britain test players and one New Zealand international (compared to 4 Australian test players, one New Zealand test player and 2 future Australian test players for Manly), took the game very seriously with pride on the line after the undefeated 1982 and 1986 Kangaroo tours had all but made a mockery of English club football.
