= Cliff Lyons =

Australian international rugby league footballer

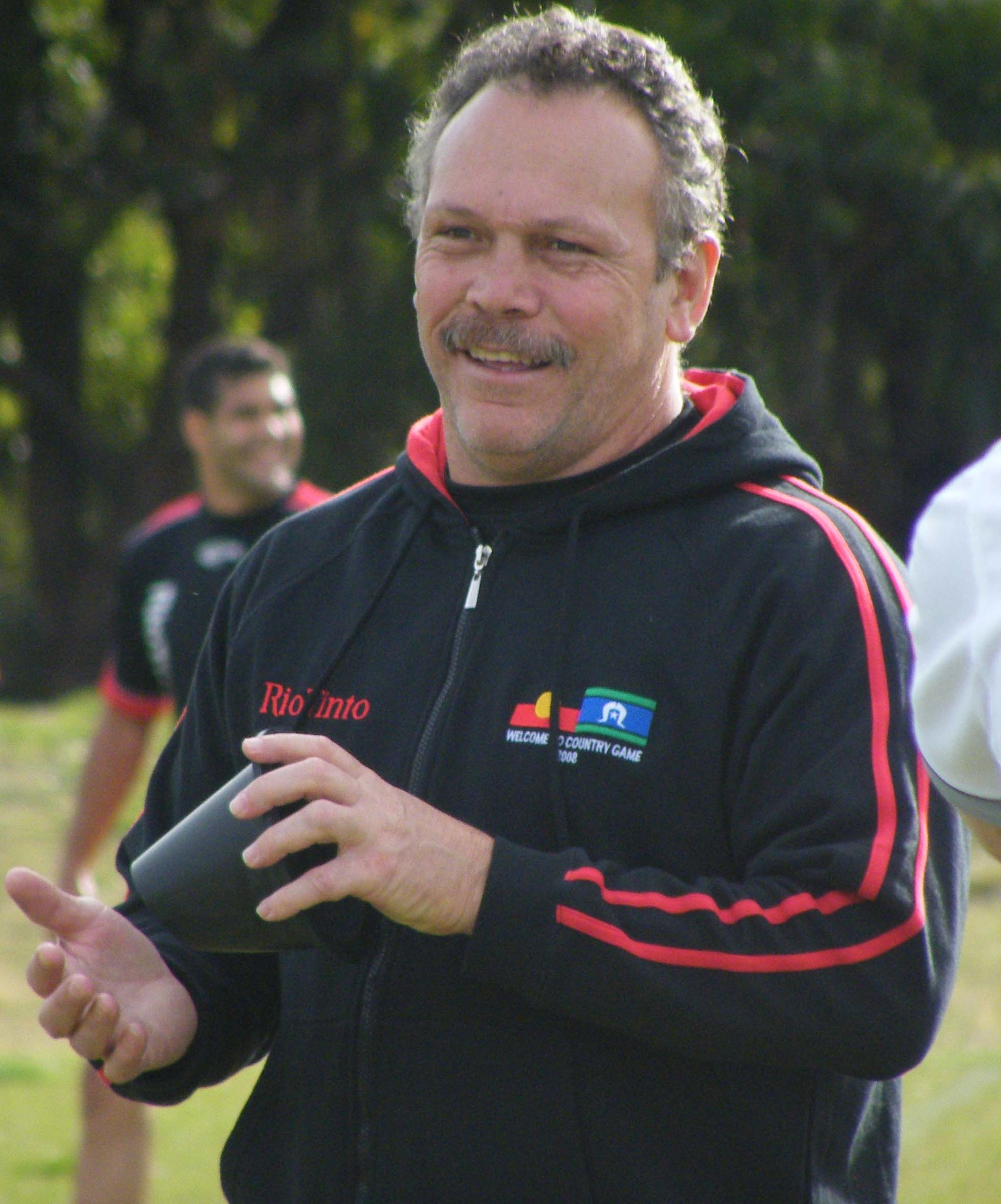
- Lyons in 2008

Personal information
- Full name: Clifford Raymond Lyons
- Born: 19 October 1961 (age 65) Narrandera, New South Wales, Australia

Playing information
- Height: 178 cm (5 ft 10 in)
- Weight: 89 kg (14 st 0 lb)
- Position: Five-eighth, Lock
Club
Years	Team	Pld	T	G	FG	P
1985	North Sydney Bears	23	7	4	1	37
1985–86	Leeds	41	9	0	2	38
1986–87	Sheffield Eagles	6	3	3	0	18
1986–99	Manly Warringah	309	80	5	6	336
1988–89	Leeds	12	7	0	0	28
	Total	391	106	12	9	457
Representative
Years	Team	Pld	T	G	FG	P
1987–91	New South Wales	6	1	0	0	4
1988–92	City Origin	3	0	0	0	0
1988	Rest of the World	1	0	0	0	0
1990–91	Australia	6	2	0	0	8

Cliff Lyons (born 19 October 1961) is an Australian former rugby league footballer who played in the 1980s and 1990s. A Clive Churchill Medallist and two-time Dally M Medallist, he made 309 first-grade appearances with the Manly Warringah Sea Eagles, winning grand finals with them in 1987 and 1996. Lyons also represented New South Wales and Australia, being part of the successful 1990 Kangaroo Tour of Great Britain and France.

Lyons, nicknamed Napper or Cliffy, started his rugby league career playing as a Lock forward, but was often moved into the Five-eighth role which is where he was considered to be at his best. It was at five-eighth that Sea Eagles coach Bob Fulton started playing Lyons on a permanent basis. Lyons' success with the Sea Eagles, winning premierships in 1987 and 1996, saw him selected in the Manly Sea Eagles 60th Anniversary Dream Team in 2006, being named on the bench of the 17-man line-up. He was notable for his elusive cross-field runs, creating doubt in the minds of defenders and setting up gaps for support players, most famously second-rower Steve Menzies, to run back into.

== Biography ==
=== Background ===
Born in Narrandera, New South Wales on 19 October 1961, Lyons played junior rugby league with Gundagai Tigers. As a teenager he moved to the Cronulla district as a boarder from Tregear near Mount Druitt. Lyons was graded as a second rower with the Cronulla-Sutherland Sharks in 1981. He played with the Gundagai Tigers in the Group 9 competition for three seasons, from where he represented Riverina against New Zealand in 1982. During the 1984 Great Britain Lions tour Lyons was selected to play for a Riverina team against the tourists as a reserve.

=== Playing career ===
==== 1980s ====
Lyons entered the NSWRFL Premiership for the first time with the North Sydney Bears midway through 1984, following his Riverina coach Greg Hawick. He made his first grade début for the Bears in Round 2 of the 1985 NSWRL season, playing five-eighth, and contributing a field goal in a 15–10 win over the Illawarra Steelers at the Wollongong Showground. He then played in England in the Australian off-season with stays with Leeds (1985–86) and Sheffield Eagles (1986–87).

Lyons moved to the neighbouring team, the Bob Fulton-coached Manly-Warringah Sea Eagles for the 1986 NSWRL season, though he mostly played at lock forward that year due to a broken arm suffered by regular lock and team captain Paul Vautin. This saw Fulton play former Wallaby Mitchell Cox at five-eighth for most of the season with mixed results. Manly finished 4th at the end of the minor round with 14 wins, 9 losses, a draw (plus 2 byes) and were bundled out in a 29–22 loss to Balmain in the Minor Preliminary Semi-final.

With Vautin fully recovered by the start of the 1987 season, Lyons became the Sea Eagles' first choice five-eighth alongside speedy Australian Kangaroos test half back Des Hasler. Lyons made his State of Origin début for New South Wales in Game 2 of 1987 State of Origin series on a wet and muddy Sydney Cricket Ground, beating out Canterbury-Bankstown pivot and 1986 Kangaroo tourist Terry Lamb as the Blues' five-eighth at the end of the representative career of Brett Kenny, and playing opposite the King of Origin football, Australian and Queensland captain Wally Lewis. Lyons also played in 1987's exhibition state of Origin match in Los Angeles. Manly went on to record a new club record of 12 straight wins during the season which culminated in the 1987 Grand Final against the Canberra Raiders. Lyons scored the only try of the first half against the Raiders after a strong 25m run from a scrum win, but it was his damaging runs that cut holes in the Raiders defence that saw him win the Clive Churchill Medal as man of the match. Following the grand final victory he travelled with Manly to England for the 1987 World Club Challenge against the 1986–87 English champions, Wigan. In front of an official 36,895 fans at Wigan's Central Park (though many in attendance believe the crowd to be closer to 50,000), Wigan stunned the Winfield Cup premiers 8–2 in a try-less game.

Despite being born and bred in the country, Lyons made the first of three appearances for City Origin in 1988 in the annual City vs Country Origin game. He appeared in two games of the 1988 State of Origin series, vying for the five-eighth position with Terry Lamb. At the end of the 1988 NSWRL season, Lyons made his international début when he was selected on the bench for a Rest of the World team that narrowly lost 30–28 to Great Britain at Headingley in Leeds, England. Joining Lyons in the side were his Manly teammates Dale Shearer (Fullback), Michael O'Connor (Centre) and Noel "Crusher" Cleal (Second-row), as well as fellow Australians Steve Ella (5/8), Allan Langer (Halfback) and Sam Backo (Prop). During the 1988–89 Rugby Football League season Lyons played at stand-off, and was awarded the White Rose Trophy as man of the match in Leeds' 33–12 victory over Castleford in the 1988 Yorkshire Cup Final at Elland Road, Leeds on Sunday 16 October 1988.

==== 1990s ====
Lyons' ability to set up tries for his support players with his unpredictable weaving runs saw him consistently win player awards, culminating in his 'breakthrough' season in 1990, age 29. After winning the coveted Gold 'Dally M' award for Player of the Year in the regular club season he received his call-up to the Australian team on the 1990 Kangaroo Tour of Great Britain and France. Australia lost the first Test 19–14 at Wembley Stadium (the Kangaroos first loss on English soil since 1978), and Lyons was thrust into the second Test side at Old Trafford. He repaid the faith shown in him by his former club coach Fulton by finishing one of the best team tries ever seen in a Test as Australia kept The Ashes alive with 14–10 win over Great Britain. Lyons then produced a solid display in the third Test as Australia retained The Ashes with a resounding 14–0 win at Elland Road. He then went on to play in both winning Tests against France, being named man-of-the-match for the 34-10 second test win at the Stade Gilbert Brutus in Perpignan.

Lyons again played for NSW in the 1991 State of Origin series, but lost his test place to a returning Wally Lewis for the first test of the 1991 Trans-Tasman Test series against New Zealand, and then was passed over in favour of North Sydney pivot Peter Jackson for the final two tests. At the end of the 1991 NSWRL season Manly finished in 2nd place behind eventual premiers Penrith in the minor round, but bombed out in straight sets in the finals with losses to North Sydney and Canberra. Lyons was then selected for the Australian national team for the 1991 Kangaroo tour of Papua New Guinea, regaining his test spot due to an injury to Jackson. On tour he played in both test matches for Australia against the Papua New Guinea Kumuls, scoring a try in the first test in Goroka in which he partnered Manly teammate Geoff Toovey in the halves, but was relegated to the bench for the final test against the Kumuls in Port Moresby.

Cliff Lyons was particularly in his element in rugby league sevens competitions, winning the 'Player of the Competition' during Manly's 1994 Sevens' win and captaining an Aboriginal 'Dream Team' in the 1996 competition. Despite winning his second Gold 'Dally M' award in 1994, as well as becoming Manly's first Rugby League Week "Player of the Year" since his coach Bob Fulton had won in 1975 (and the club's last as of 2016), he missed selection for that year's Kangaroo tour at the age of 33 in favour of younger players.

Lyons resisted a lucrative offer from the Western Reds to stay with the Sea Eagles in 1995, and went on to play in three consecutive grand finals from 1995 to 1997, winning his second premiership in 1996 with a 20–8 win over St. George. At the end of the 1998 season, in which he was mainly used off the bench, Lyons reluctantly retired after not being offered a contract.

In January 1999 Lyons was playing for Warringah in a rugby sevens competition, but following the Sea Eagles' disastrous start to the 1999 NRL season, he made a comeback with the club, passing the 300 first-grade game mark late in the season. He became the oldest player in the NRL at 37 years and 313 days, and also retired with Manly's club record for most first-grade appearances. At the end of the year, Lyons was named Aboriginal Sportsman of the Year (tied with Nicky Winmar) and captained Australian Aborigines in an unofficial 'test' against Papua New Guinea in Cairns.

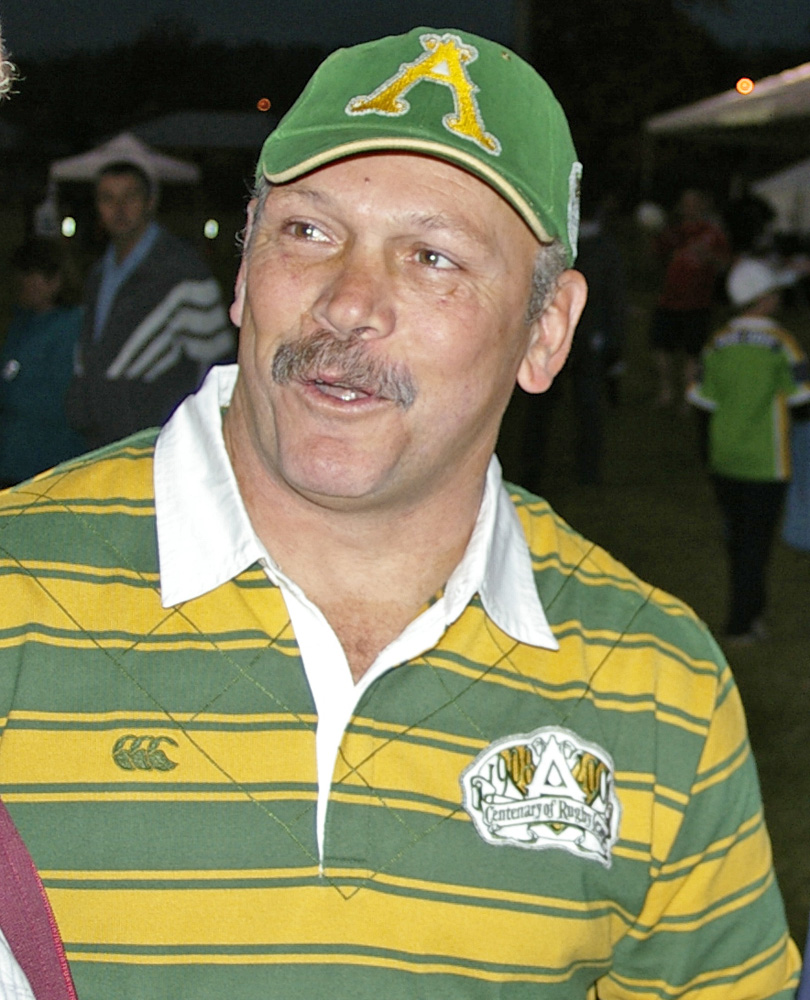
Lyons in 2008

==== 2000s ====
In the year 2000, Lyons was awarded the Australian Sports Medal for his contribution to Australia's international standing in rugby league. Cut from the newly formed Northern Eagles at year's end, he signed with Umina and captain-coached the Central Coast club in 2001, the year he celebrated his 40th birthday.

Lyons made a cameo appearance in the 2006 film, Footy Legends.

Lyons' 309 first grade games for Manly is the club record. Into his 40s Cliff's career continued with the Hornsby Lions, and more recently the Narraweena Hawks.

In 2018, Lyons was inducted in the National Rugby League Hall of Fame.

=== Coaching career ===
Having coached Narraweena to consecutive premierships in the Manly A-Grade competition, Lyons joined moved into the NSW Cup as coach of the Manly-Warringah Sea Eagles side just before the 2012 season.

After leading Manly to a 6th-place finish in the 2012 NSW Cup season, Lyons was replaced as Manly's NSW Cup coach for the 2013 season by former Sea Eagle Luke Williamson.

== Accolades ==
- Dally M Medal Player of the Year: 1990, 1994
- Dally M Five-eighth of the Year: 1990, 1994
- Rugby League Week Player of the Year: 1994
- Clive Churchill Medal winner: 1987
- Indigenous Team of the Century: 2008
- 2018 National Rugby League Hall of Fame inductee: #102
