= Noel Cleal =

Australia international rugby league footballer and coach

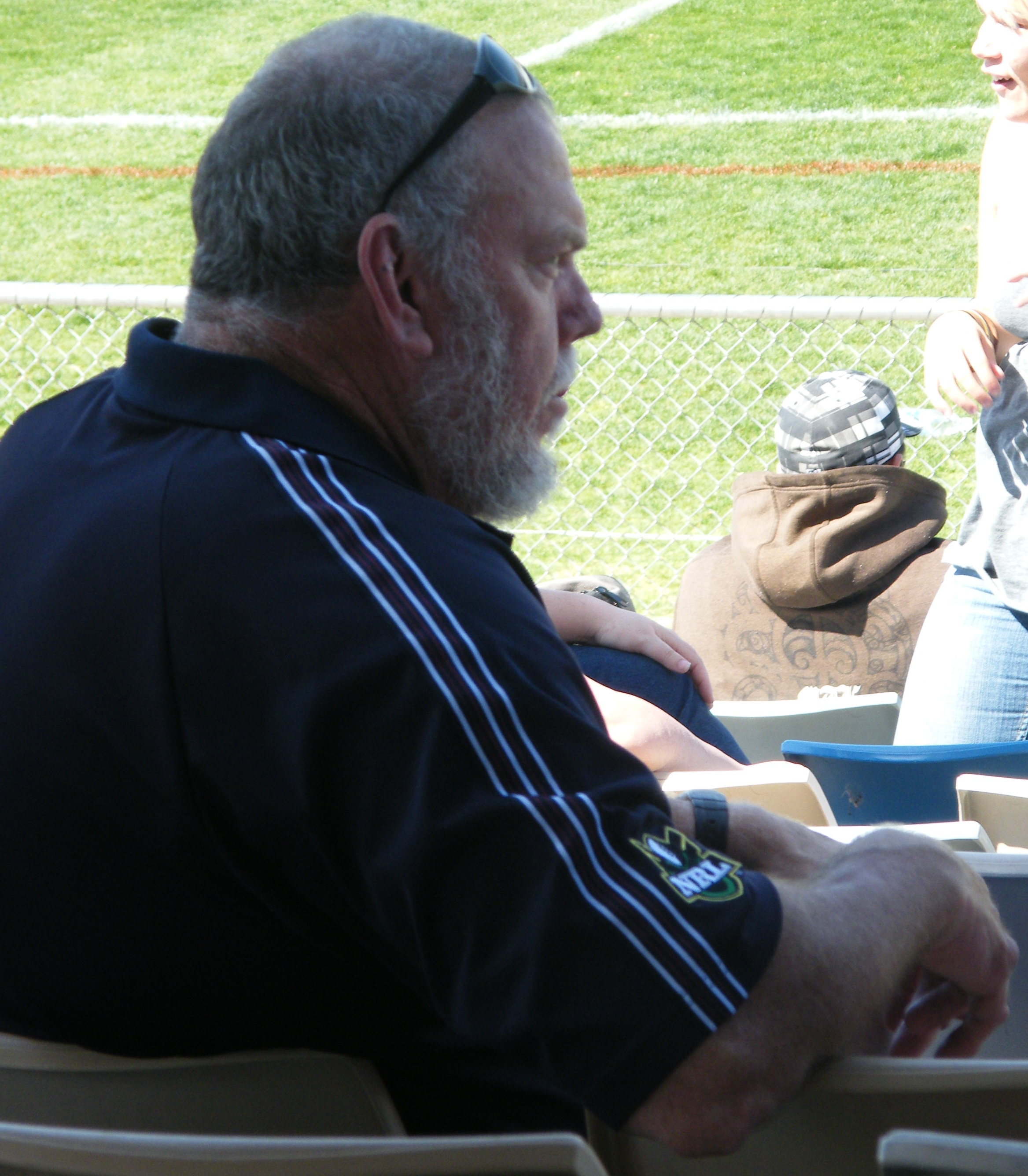

Personal information
- Full name: Noel Harvey Cleal
- Born: 16 October 1958 (age 68) Warialda, New South Wales, Australia

Playing information
- Position: Second-row, Centre
Club
Years	Team	Pld	T	G	FG	P
1980–82	Eastern Suburbs	70	26	1	0	80
1983–89	Manly Sea Eagles	128	43	10	0	192
1985–86	Widnes	16	8	0	0	32
1989–90	Hull FC	31	15	0	0	60
	Total	245	92	11	0	364
Representative
Years	Team	Pld	T	G	FG	P
1985–86	Australia	10	5	0	0	20
1981–88	New South Wales	13	3	0	0	12
1984	City Firsts	1	1	0	0	4
1985–86	Country Firsts	2	1	0	0	4
1987	Country Origin	1	1	0	0	4

Coaching information
Club
Years	Team	Gms	W	D	L	W%
1991	Hull FC
Representative
Years	Team	Gms	W	D	L	W%
1996	Fiji	1	0	0	1	0
- Source: As of 3 October 2010
- Relatives: Kane Cleal (son)

Noel Harvey "Crusher" Cleal (born 16 October 1958) is an Australian former professional rugby league footballer and coach. A destructive second-row for the Manly Sea Eagles, he also represented New South Wales in the State of Origin Series and the Australian national rugby league team.

== Background ==
Noel Cleal was born in Warialda, New South Wales, Australia.

== Club career ==
Noel Cleal along with his brother Les came to Sydney first-grade rugby league having already established a name for himself in the country. He had captain-coached the Wondai side to a country premiership in Queensland and, with his brother Les, helped steer an undefeated Sawtell Panthers to a Clayton Cup and maiden premiership, then represented for New South Wales Northern Division against the touring Great Britain Lions in 1979.

"Crusher" began his Sydney career with Eastern Suburbs Roosters in 1980 where he played at Centre. He had three seasons with the Roosters before following coach Bob Fulton to Manly in 1983. Following the move to Manly, Fulton switched Cleal to second-row, a move which assisted Cleal's ascendancy to State and National representative honours.

Before the start of the 1987 NSWRL season, the Manly board had wanted coach Fulton to install Cleal as club captain replacing Paul Vautin. Fulton however had other ideas and Vautin retained the captaincy. After missing the first eight games of the season while recovering from a broken arm suffered against Hull F.C. on the 1986 Kangaroo tour, Cleal returned to the side from the bench in the Round 9 clash with Easts at Brookvale Oval (scoring the winning try from a Paul Vautin kick). From then on he played each game from the second row, helping the Sea Eagles to their 1987 Grand Final win over the Canberra Raiders in the last grand final played at the Sydney Cricket Ground (Cleal, who was one of the Sea Eagles better players on an unseasonably hot day, suffered a knock to the head during the game and finished the match on the bench). During that year the relationship between Vautin and Cleal was reported to be 'frosty' as a result of the captaincy saga, though both players dispute the claims.

During the 1988 Great Britain Lions tour of Australia and New Zealand, Cleal captained what was a makeshift Manly side that was missing 6 regular first grade players to a famous 30–0 win over the Lions at Brookvale Oval. Manly had gone into the mid-week match missing captain Paul Vautin, centre Michael O'Connor, prop forward Phil Daley (all rested for the following weekends first Ashes series test against the Lions), as well as fullback Dale Shearer, winger David Ronson and hooker Mal Cochrane. Cleal had a point to prove in the game against the Lions after controversially being left out of Australia's squad for the Ashes series.

Following from a 1985–86 stint with English club Widnes, Cleal returned to English rugby league in 1989 for two seasons with Hull FC after injury had restricted him to only 4 games for Manly during the 1989 Winfield Cup season. Cleal retired from playing during the 1990–91 season, during which he had become coach of Hull following the departure of Brian Smith to St George. This included coaching Hull (from the sidelines) when they played the Bob Fulton coached Australians at The Boulevard during the 1990 Kangaroo Tour in which the Kangaroos defeated Hull 34–4. After the game Cleal told Channel 10 who were covering the tour that "I'm sitting on both sides of the fence here. It's good to see the Aussies play so well, especially with the third test coming up. But I thought that our guys were just outclassed, they were a far better side. And I suppose when you're hot, you're hot and the Aussies were hot tonight. That was the end of the story."

Despite the heavy defeat by the Kangaroos, Cleal coached Hull to go on to win the Premiership for the 1990–91 season, defeating the defending premiers Widnes 14–4 in the Premiership Trophy Final at Old Trafford, Manchester on Sunday 12 May 1991.

== Representative career ==
After having made his representative début in the centres for NSW in the second game of the 1981 Interstate series against Queensland at Sydney's Leichhardt Oval (the last game played under the old "State of Residence" rules), Cleal represented the NSW Blues in 12 State of Origin games between 1984 and 1988. Some of Cleal's best football was played at the State of Origin level, he was the NSW forward who troubled Queensland most at a time when the Blues were just beginning to match the passion of their interstate rivals. He is commonly known as the man who coined the inspirational phrase "Dare to Dream" which was an extract from the game and series winning pep talk given by him during half time of game 2 of the 1985 state of origin series.

Noel Cleal's most famous moment in Origin football was also an embarrassing one. During Game 2 of the 1984 series on a wet and very muddy Sydney Cricket Ground, Cleal attempted a goal-line drop out after the Blues had been caught in their own in-goal area. Unfortunately for Cleal and NSW, his attempted kick travelled less than a metre resulting in a Qld penalty from which Mal Meninga scored two vital points. Cleal's kick was made to look worse later in the game when Qld captain Wally Lewis kicked a 45-metre drop-out from the same spot. However, Lewis later admitted that he had used his teammates to distract referee Barry Gomersall enough so that he did not drop-kick the ball as required, but actually kicked it just before it hit the ground and got stuck in the mud as Cleal's kick had.

Despite being from the country, Cleal was chosen for City Firsts at the Sydney Cricket Ground in 1984 at a time when the annual City vs Country game was played under residence rules. Cleal scored one of City's 7 tries as City continued their dominance with an easy 38–12 win. From 1985 Cleal would be selected for Country Firsts, playing for the team in 1985 and 1986. The annual clash was then played under Origin rules from 1987 with Cleal playing his only game for Country Origin that year, again scoring a try despite losing 30–22 at Parramatta Stadium.

Cleal played 10 Tests for Australia in 1985 and 1986. He made his test début in Game 1 of the 1985 Trans-Tasman Test series at Lang Park in Brisbane, scoring a try on début as Australia defeated New Zealand 26–20. The game was noted for the spiteful clash between rival props Greg Dowling (Australia) and Kevin Tamati (NZ). Both had been sent to the sin-bin by French referee Julien Rascagneres, but the fight started up again on the sidelines right in front of the Channel 9 television cameras. Cleal was moved to the bench (for the only time in his test career) for the second test at Carlaw Park in Auckland following the return of his club teammate Paul Vautin as Australia wrapped up the series with a 10–6 win thanks to a late John Ribot try and conversion which got them out of gaol after looking at an embarrassing 6–4 loss. Following mass changes to the team by coach Terry Fearnley, which included Cleal being dropped from the team, the Kiwis out classed the disjointed Australians with a resounding 18–0 win in the third test at Carlaw Park.

After NSW won the 1986 State of Origin series 3-0 (the first clean sweep in Origin history), Cleal then played in all 3 tests of the 1986 Trans-Tasman Test series against New Zealand (won 3-0 by the now Don Furner coached Aussies), before being selected for the 1986 Kangaroo Tour of Great Britain and France where he played 7 games (including one on the wing against Halifax at Thrum Hall) and scored 3 tries. Cleal played three more tests on the tour, including scoring two tries in Australia's 62–12 win in a pre-tour test against Papua New Guinea in Port Moresby, as well as the first two tests of The Ashes series against Great Britain, both easily won by the Kangaroos 38–16 at Old Trafford in Manchester and 34–4 at the Elland Road ground in Leeds. Cleal then suffered a broken arm in a minor tour game that ended his tour. The second test against Great Britain in Leeds where his strong running resulted in his 5th test try and being named as the official Man of the Match, would prove to be Noel Cleal's final test appearance for Australia.

== Post playing ==
In his first year as coach of Hull FC, Cleal took the club to Premiership victory during the 1990–91 season. Although still the assistant coach to Brian Smith at the time, Cleal's first time coaching Hull was when they lost 34–4 to Australia who were on the 1990 Kangaroo tour with Smith taking a backseat role as he was preparing to return to Sydney to coach St George.

On his return to Australia in 1992 he was appointed junior development and recruitment officer with the Parramatta Eels.

In 2004 Cleal returned to Manly in a similar role, but moved to the Canterbury-Bankstown Bulldogs in 2012 (along with Manly coach Des Hasler) following the Sea Eagles 2011 NRL Grand Final win over the New Zealand Warriors.

== Accolades ==
In 1984 he was the runner up in the Rothman's Medal and was named as the Dally M Second Rower of the year. He was runner up to Parramatta's Peter Wynn in the 1985 Dally M Second Rower of the year, but would win the award for a second time in 1986.

In 2000 Cleal was awarded the Australian Sports Medal for his representative career for his country and state, and his supportive of Junior League at Local and regional level.

In 2005 he was named one of the 25 greatest ever players for NSW.

== Playing Record ==
Team	Matches	Years	Tries	Goals	Field Goals
Northern Division	2	1979	-	-	-
Eastern Suburbs Roosters	70	1980–1982	26	1	-
Eastern Suburbs Roosters (Cup)	13	1980–1982	5	-	-
Manly Warringah Sea Eagles	128	1983–1989	43	10	-
Manly Warringah Sea Eagles (Cup)	13	1983–1989	3	-	-
Widnes	16	1985–1986	8	-	-
Hull F.C.	31	1989–1990	12	-	-
City Firsts	1	1984	1	-	-
Country Firsts	2	1985–1986	1	-	-
Country Origin	1	1987	1	-	-
New South Wales	1	1981	-	-	-
New South Wales (Origin)	12	1984–1988	3	-	-
Australia (Tests)	8	1985–1986	3	-	-
Australia (World Cup)	2	1985–1986	2	-	-
Australia (tour games)	8	1985–1986	7	-	-
TOTAL	307	1979–1990	115	11	0

His son Kane made his first grade début with Manly in 2004. Kane played professional rugby league for South Sydney Rabbitohs, Canterbury Bulldogs and Manly Sea Eagles.
