= Mark Cannon =

Mark Cannon may refer to:

- Mark Cannon (American football) (born 1962), former American football offensive lineman
- Mark Cannon (rugby league) (born 1961), Australian rugby league footballer who played in the 1980s
