= David French (rugby league) =

Australian rugby league footballer

Personal information
- Full name: David French
- Born: 3 October 1963 (age 63)

Playing information
- Position: Centre, Wing
Club
Years	Team	Pld	T	G	FG	P
1984	Balmain	10	0	0	0	0
1986–89	Eastern Suburbs	38	9	0	0	36
	Total	48	9	0	0	36
Representative
Years	Team	Pld	T	G	FG	P
1985	NSW Country	1	0	0	0	0
- Source: As of 16 January 2023

David French nicknamed "Frog" is an Australian former professional rugby league footballer who played in the 1980s. He played for Eastern Suburbs and Balmain in NSWRL competition.

== Playing career ==
French made his first grade debut for Balmain in round 1 of the 1984 NSWRL season against the Illawarra Steelers. French played ten games for Balmain before departing the club. In 1985, French was selected to play in the annual City vs Country Origin game. In 1986, French signed for Eastern Suburbs. In round 11 of the 1988 NSWRL season, French broke the jaw of Manly player Dale Shearer. Shearer was later awarded $60,000 in compensation. French played one final season with Easts in 1989 but was released at the end of the season.
