= Ian Gately =

Australian rugby league footballer

Personal information
- Born: 21 March 1966 (age 58); Sydney, New South Wales, Australia

Playing information
- Position: Prop, Second-row
Club
Years	Team	Pld	T	G	FG	P
1987–89	Manly Sea Eagles	37	2	10	0	28
1990–91	Parramatta Eels	9	1	3	0	10
1992	Canberra Raiders	0	0	0	0	0
1992–97	Keighley Cougars
	Total	46	3	13	0	38

Ian Gately (born 21 March 1966) is an Australian former professional rugby league footballer who played for the Manly Warringah Sea Eagles and the Parramatta Eels.

== Biography ==
A Sydney-born forward, Gately played for Manly Warringah in the late 1980s. He debuted in the 1987 NSWRL season and made seven first-grade appearances that year, including Manly's semi-final win over Eastern Suburbs, but missed out on a place in the premiership-winning grand final team. At the end of the season, he was part of the Manly squad to travel to England to play the World Club Challenge, featuring as a prop in the club’s six-point loss to Wigan.

In 1988, he was a regular fixture for the Sea Eagles in first grade, putting together 21 appearances as a prop and second-rower. He occasionally filled in as goal-kicker when Michael O'Connor wasn't available. During the 1988 season, he also twice played against the touring Great Britain national team, scoring a try in Manly's 30-0 win at Brookvale Oval. He additionally represented the President's XIII, off the interchange bench, in a tour match against Great Britain in Queanbeyan.

After a third and final season with Manly, Gately joined the Mick Cronin-coached Parramatta Eels in 1990. However, he was unable to make an impact in first grade during his two seasons at Parramatta and spent most of his time in the reserves. In 1992, he spent a pre-season trialing with the Canberra Raiders, but failed to get signed to a contract and instead finished his career in England.

Gately went on to play six seasons for English club Keighley and was a member of two championship-winning teams.
