= Kane Cleal =

Australian rugby league footballer

Personal information
- Full name: Kane Cleal
- Born: 5 April 1984 (age 42) Manly, New South Wales, Australia

Playing information
- Height: 182 cm (6 ft 0 in)
- Weight: 103 kg (16 st 3 lb)
- Position: Prop, Second-row
Club
Years	Team	Pld	T	G	FG	P
2004–05	Manly Sea Eagles	14	1	0	0	4
2006	South Sydney	9	0	0	0	0
2007–08	Canterbury Bulldogs	19	2	0	0	8
	Total	42	3	0	0	12
- Father: Noel Cleal

Kane Cleal (born 5 April 1984) is an Australian former professional rugby league footballer who played in the NRL. He played for the Manly-Warringah Sea Eagles, Canterbury-Bankstown Bulldogs and the South Sydney Rabbitohs.

== Background ==
Kane is the son of former Manly, NSW and Australian rugby league footballer, Noel Cleal. He is also the nephew of former Roosters player Les Cleal. Cleal played his junior rugby league for the Warialda Wombats before joining the Hills Bulls when the family moved to Sydney. Cleal graduated from Gilroy College, Castle Hill in 2001 and entered the JETS program at the Parramatta Eels.

== Playing career ==
Cleal made his first grade debut for Manly-Warringah in Round 3 of the 2004 NRL season against Cronulla-Sutherland at Shark Park. Cleal made nine appearances in his debut season, and another five in 2005.

Early in the 2006 NRL season, Cleal joined South Sydney. He played nine games for Souths as the club finished last on the table. Cleal was subsequently released by Souths and he joined Canterbury-Bankstown for the 2007 NRL season.

Cleal scored his first try for Canterbury-Bankstown in the 2007 Good Friday clash against his former club South Sydney, with the Bulldogs winning 34–10.

Cleal suffered a severe broken jaw on 8 July 2007 in a tackle with Cronulla-Sutherland Sharks prop Ben Ross. The second such injury of his career, the first occurring in the 2002 S.G Ball Cup grand final, it ended his 2007 season. Cleal suffered a groin injury early in the 2008 NRL season, only managing four games for Canterbury as the club finished last on the table and claimed the wooden spoon.

Cleal resigned with South Sydney for the 2009 and 2010 seasons. However, he suffered a career-ending hand injury in a training drill that went wrong and was forced to retired from the game at the end of 2009 at the age of 25.

In 2013, Cleal signed on to play one game for the Coolah Kangaroos in the Castlereagh Cup.
