= Michael Erickson =

Australian rugby league footballer

Personal information
- Born: 15 June 1968 (age 58) Taree, New South Wales, Australia

Playing information
- Position: Centre, Wing
Club
Years	Team	Pld	T	G	FG	P
1987–96	Parramatta Eels	112	31	0	0	124
Representative
Years	Team	Pld	T	G	FG	P
1990	NSW Country	1	0	0	0	0

Michael Erickson (born 15 June 1968) is an Australian former rugby league footballer who played in the 1980s and 1990s. He played his entire ten-season career for the Parramatta Eels. His position was usually at centre, but also played on the wing. After the conclusion of his playing career, Erickson was made a life member of the club in 1996.
