= John McArthur (rugby league) =

Australian rugby league footballer

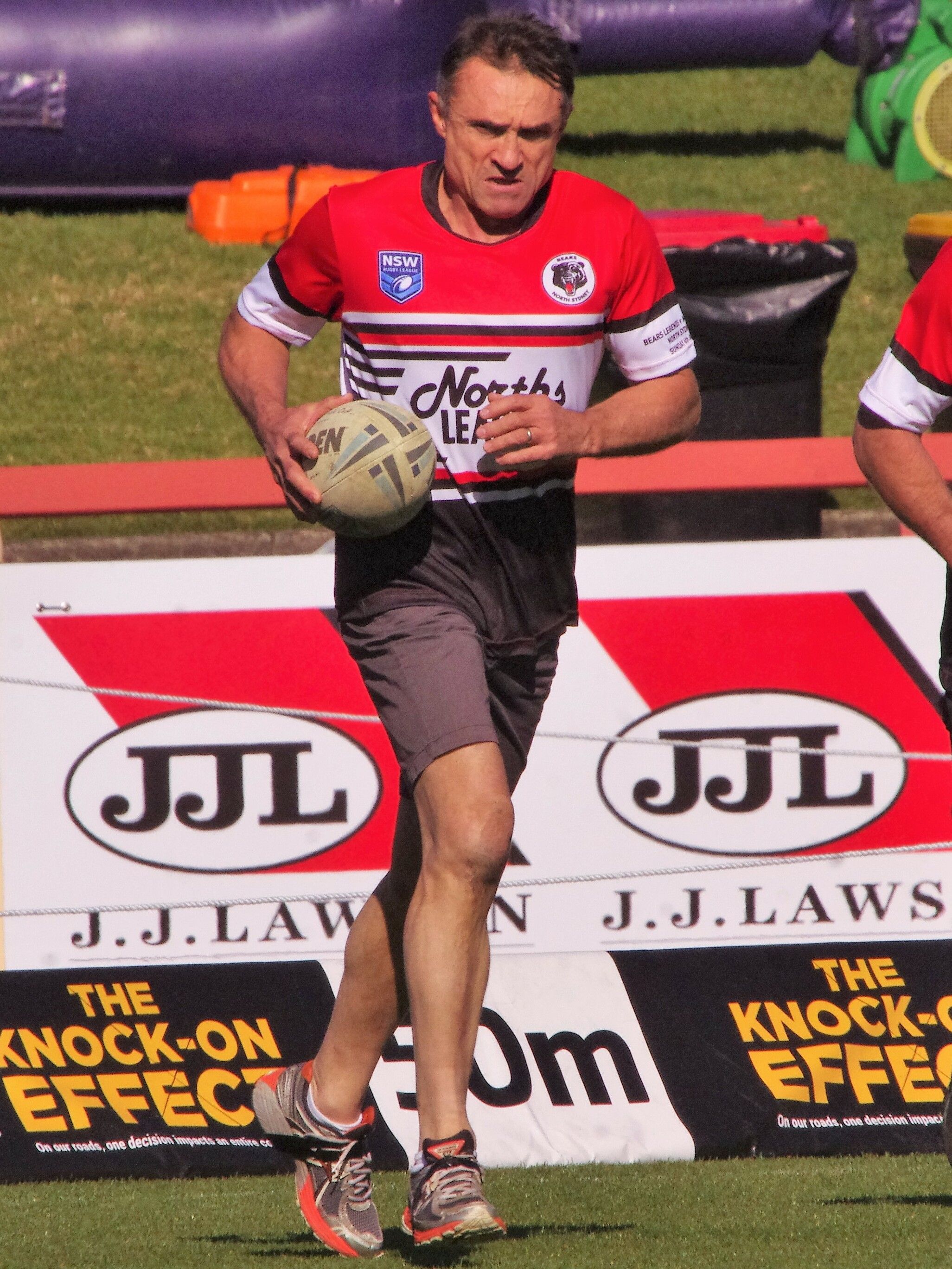

Personal information
- Full name: John McArthur
- Born: 20 October 1964 (age 60); Sydney, New South Wales, Australia

Playing information
- Position: Fullback, Halfback, Centre
Club
Years	Team	Pld	T	G	FG	P
1984–85	Western Suburbs	45	9	37	1	111
1986–95	North Sydney	133	28	25	2	164
	Total	178	37	62	3	275

John McArthur (born 20 October 1964) is an Australian former professional rugby league footballer who played in the 1980s and 1990s.

== Playing career ==
McArthur started his first grade career at Western Suburbs in 1984 which was a tough year for the club on the field where they only claimed one victory in the entire season and finished last on the table.

After another difficult year with Wests in 1985, McArthur joined North Sydney where he spent the following nine seasons before retiring at the end of the 1995. McArthur played in two finals campaigns for Norths in 1986 and in 1991 where the club went to within one game of the grand final but were defeated by Canberra in the preliminary final.
