= Matthew Corkery =

Australian rugby league footballer

Personal information
- Full name: Matthew Corkery
- Born: 1 April 1965 (age 59); Canberra, A.C.T., Australia

Playing information
- Position: Wing
Club
Years	Team	Pld	T	G	FG	P
1984–89	Canberra Raiders	56	19	5	0	86
1990–91	Cronulla Sharks	17	3	28	0	68
	Total	73	22	33	0	154
- Source: As of 9 April 2019

Matthew Corkery is an Australian former rugby league footballer who played in the 1980s and 1990s. He played for the Canberra Raiders and the Cronulla-Sutherland Sharks in the New South Wales Rugby League (NSWRL) competition.

== Background ==
Corkery played junior rugby league in the Canberra area before being graded by the Canberra Raiders as an 18 year old.

== Playing career ==
Corkery made his first grade debut for Canberra against North Sydney in Round 16 1984 at Seiffert Oval. It would not be until the 1987 season that Corkery cemented a spot in the team. Corkery played 26 times for Canberra in 1987 as the club reached their first ever grand final against Manly-Warringah. Corkery played on the wing as Canberra were defeated 18–8 in the last ever grand final to be played at the Sydney Cricket Ground. Corkery finished the season as the club's top try scorer with 14 tries.

By the end of the 1989 season, Corkery was released by Canberra and he went on to join Cronulla-Sutherland and then St George. Corkery retired as a player at the end of the 1992 season.

== Post playing ==
Corkery coached the Canberra Raiders U/18 women's Tarsha Gale Cup side until 2019. Corkery currently works in Canberra providing project management services for high-profile clients across the ACT.
