= Ron Gibbs =

Australian rugby league footballer

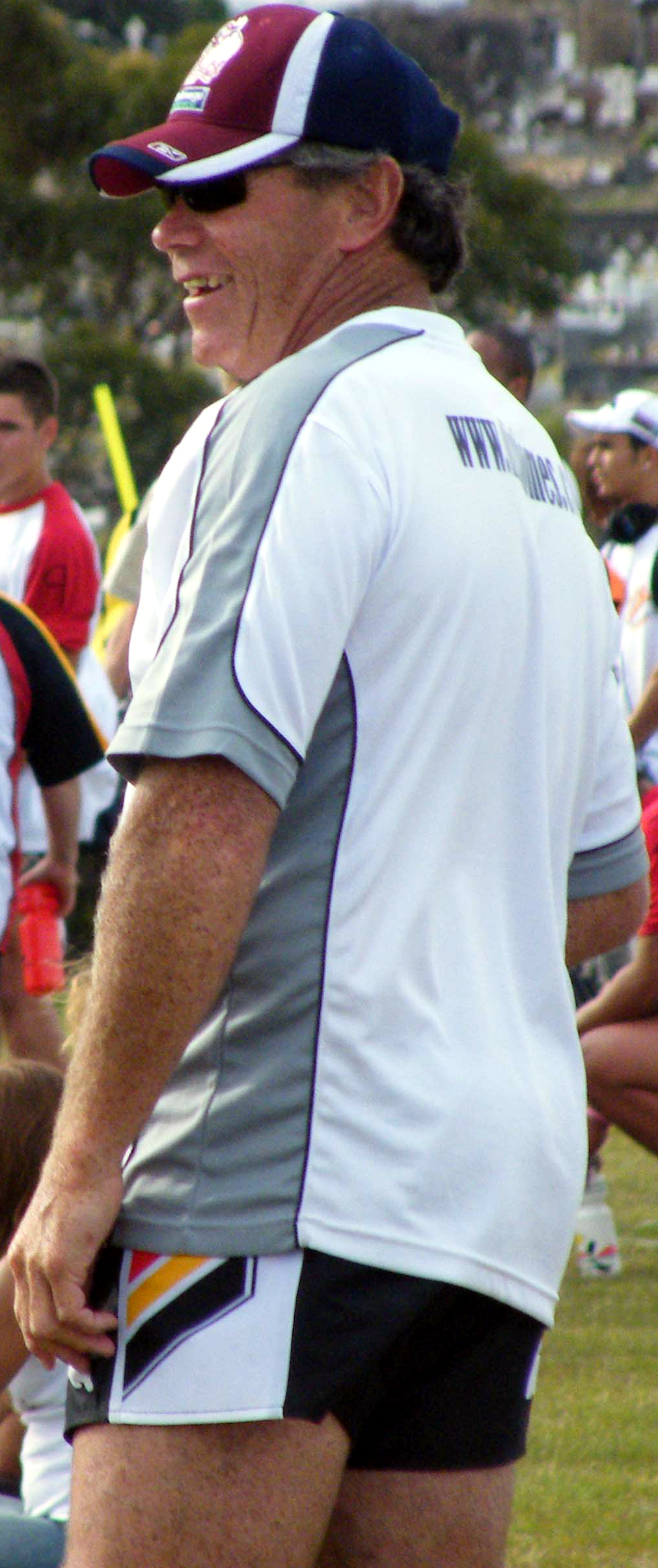

Personal information
- Born: 14 April 1962 (age 64) Brewarrina, New South Wales, Australia
- Height: 187 cm (6 ft 2 in)
- Weight: 90 kg (14 st 2 lb)

Playing information
- Position: Second-row, Centre
Club
Years	Team	Pld	T	G	FG	P
1983–85	Eastern Suburbs	28	5	1	0	22
1986–87	Manly-Warringah	47	6	0	0	24
1988–90	Gold Coast	56	6	0	0	24
1988–90	Castleford	41	12	0	0	48
1991	Western Suburbs	16	0	0	0	0
	Total	188	29	1	0	118
Representative
Years	Team	Pld	T	G	FG	P
1987–89	Country NSW	2	0	0	0	0
1990	Australian Aborigines
- Source: As of 1 February 2019

Ron Gibbs (born 14 April 1962), also known by the nickname of "Rambo", is an Australian former rugby league footballer who played professionally in Australia and England. An Australian Aboriginal and Country New South Wales representative three-quarter back or second-row forward, he played his club football in the New South Wales Rugby League for Eastern Suburbs, Manly-Warringah (with whom he won the 1987 NSWRL Premiership), Gold Coast-Tweed and Western Suburbs, as well as in England for Castleford.

== Playing career ==
In 1982 Gibbs, nicknamed "Rambo" for his fearless runs at the defensive line, scored three tries for the Western Suburbs Rosellas as they defeated Kurri Kurri to win the Newcastle Rugby League Grand Final 21–14 at the Newcastle International Sports Centre.

Gibbs made his NSWRL Premiership début for Eastern Suburbs in 1983 against Illawarra. He was the club's captain in 1984 and 1985 before handing the job over to John Tobin.

He joined the Bob Fulton coached Manly-Warringah in 1986 and played in 47 games for the club, including the winning 1987 Grand Final against Canberra in the last Grand Final played at the Sydney Cricket Ground. In 1987 he also represented New South Wales Country in the annual City v Country Origin match. His last game for the club was the 1987 World Club Challenge at Central Park in Wigan, England. Gibbs became the first player sent off in a World Club Challenge following a high tackle on Wigan centre Joe Lydon. Wigan won a try-less game 8–2 in front of 36,895 fans.

"Rambo never cared if you were with him or against him . . . get in his way and you copped it."

— Chris Close

In 1988 he joined the new Gold Coast-Tweed club as their key signing, although he missed their opening six matches and according to observers "produced his rampaging best only rarely". He spent the 1988-89 off-season in England, playing for the Castleford Tigers. Ron Gibbs played at second-row in Castleford's 12–33 defeat by Leeds in the 1988 Yorkshire Cup Final during the 1988–89 season at Elland Road, Leeds on Sunday 16 October 1988. In 1989 Gibbs again represented NSW Country and was made the Giants captain. In 1990 Gibbs again played for both Gold Coast-Tweed and Castleford. He also represented the Australian Aboriginal side in the 1990 Pacific Cup.

During the 1990/1991 off-season, Gibbs negotiated with Wests, who had acquired a number of class players and were looking at their first finals series since 1982, but was drafted by wooden spooner South Sydney. Gibbs refused to play for South Sydney, but despite the Rabbitohs' refusal to let go of him, his court appeal was won with a unanimous vote on the twelfth of March, 1991. Gibbs' victory stands in contrast to the better-known turning down of identical appeals by Terry Hill and Emosi Koloto. Gibbs spent only one season with the Magpies before retiring.

Gibbs later said of his many games, "I would have been concussed in over half of them. On some of the little concussions when I got smashed I had nausea, felt like spewing, I was light-headed and you do lose your sense of balance, all of that, it all comes with it. As soon as I’d got into the next tackle my body would just click back into gear, sort of like driving a manual car. I'm sure there is after-effects. But I loved every minute of it. I’d do it all over again".
