= John Allanson =

Australian rugby league footballer

Personal information
- Born: 7 December 1967 (age 58) New South Wales, Australia

Playing information
- Position: Wing
Club
Years	Team	Pld	T	G	FG	P
1987–88	Western Suburbs	29	10	0	0	40
1989–90	Newcastle Knights	14	1	0	0	4
	Total	43	11	0	0	44
Representative
Years	Team	Pld	T	G	FG	P
1987–90	NSW Country	2	0	0	0	0
- Source: As of 6 February 2019

John Allanson is an Australian former professional rugby league footballer who played in the 1980s and 1990s. He played for the Western Suburbs Magpies from 1987 to 1988 and the Newcastle Knights from 1989 to 1990. He played for Country Origin in 1987 and 1990. Allanson is a life member of Stockton & Northern Districts Cricket Club.

== Playing career ==
John Allanson made his debut for Western Suburbs in round 3 of 1987, a 22-11 loss against Manly. Playing on the wing, he scored a try in each of his first four games. He switched to centre mid-season and remained there except for two games at fullback. His selection on the wing for Country Firsts was described as one of the "bright spots" of the Magpies' season. Allanson made 21 appearances in his debut season as the club finished last on the table. He was limited to 8 appearances the following year as Wests again finished last, his sole victory coming in a "dominant" performance off the bench in round 17.

In 1989, John Allanson joined Newcastle, in their second season in the competition. He was one of five debutants in round 1, coming off the bench in a victory over his previous club, Wests. He played in just 9 games, his sole try coming in he last game of the season. He played 2 seasons with the club before retiring. He held the rare achievement of representing Newcastle in cricket, rugby league and rugby union.
