= Craig Connor =

Australian rugby league footballer

Personal information
- Full name: Craig Connor
- Born: 31 August 1963 (age 61)

Playing information
- Position: Lock, Second-row
Club
Years	Team	Pld	T	G	FG	P
1983–90	Penrith Panthers	75	16	5	1	75

Craig Connor (born 31 August 1963) is an Australian former professional rugby league footballer who played during the 1980s. He played his entire club football career with the Penrith Panthers. He played primarily at lock, but also played the occasional game at second-row

== Playing career ==
A St Marys junior, Connor was graded by the Panthers in 1982. He made his first grade debut from the bench in his side's 40−6 loss to the Western Suburbs Magpies at Lidcombe Oval in round 9 of the 1983 season. Connor had his best season at the club in the 1984 season, he played in 23 of his side's 24 games and scored 5 tries.

Connor would remain with the Panthers until the end of the 1990 season. His final game in first grade was from the bench in his side's 14−2 victory over the Parramatta Eels at Penrith Stadium in round 16 of the 1990 season. In total, Connor played 86 games, and scored 10 tries.

After his departure from Penrith, Connor went on to captain coach Lithgow Workmen's Club in the Group 10 competition in 1991 to Minor Premiers, Club Champions and Premiers for the first time in 30 years for Workies.

It was a hard-fought Premiership with two replays, the final was replayed after a draw, and extra time, then the Grand Final was also replayed for the first time ever, after a draw when the score was still locked after extra time. Connor moved on to coach the Bathurst Penguins in 1993 in the Group 10 Rugby League competition with success as Minor Premiers, Club Champions but were knocked out in the Final.
