= Mark Robinson (rugby league) =

Australian rugby league footballer

Personal information
- Born: 5 October 1964 (age 60)

Playing information
- Position: Wing
Club
Years	Team	Pld	T	G	FG	P
1985–87	Penrith Panthers	23	9	0	0	36
1988–89	Parramatta Eels	10	1	0	0	4
1990–91	Canterbury Bulldogs	24	6	0	0	24
	Total	57	16	0	0	64

Mark Robinson (born 5 October 1964) is an Australian former professional rugby league footballer who played for the Penrith Panthers, Parramatta Eels and Canterbury Bulldogs.

== Rugby league career ==
Robinson, a tall winger, was a local Penrith junior and made his Panthers first-grade debut in 1985. He played in Penrith's finals series that year but then didn't feature in the 1986 NSWRL season as he was suffering from pneumonia. In 1987 he returned to first-grade and was the leading try scorer that season for Penrith.

In 1988 he moved to Parramatta and spent two seasons at the club, before being released.

From 1990 to 1991 he played first-grade with Canterbury. He was a regular fixture on the wing for Canterbury in 1990 and scored a hat-trick of tries against Cronulla in round five.
