= Michael O'Connor (rugby) =

Australia dual-code international rugby footballer

Personal information
- Full name: Michael David O'Connor
- Born: 30 November 1960 (age 65) Nowra, New South Wales, Australia

Playing information

Rugby union
- Position: Wing
Club
Years	Team	Pld	T	G	FG	P
1978–80	Canberra Royals
1981–82	North Brisbane
	Total	0	0	0	0	0
Representative
Years	Team	Pld	T	G	FG	P
1979–82	Australia	13

Rugby league
- Position: Centre, Wing
Club
Years	Team	Pld	T	G	FG	P
1983–86	St. George Dragons	78	33	130	9	401
1987–92	Manly Sea Eagles	115	54	180	2	578
1988–89	St Helens	18	7	7	0	42
	Total	211	94	317	11	1021
Representative
Years	Team	Pld	T	G	FG	P
1985–91	City NSW	6	4	19	0	54
1985–91	New South Wales	19	11	42	1	129
1985–90	Australia	18	17	65	0	198

Michael David O'Connor (born 30 November 1960) is an Australian former rugby league and rugby union footballer who represented Australia in both codes. He played for the Wallabies in 13 Tests from 1979 to 1982 and then the Kangaroos in 17 Tests from 1985 to 1990. O'Connor played club football in the NSWRL Premiership for the St. George Dragons from 1983 until 1986, and later the Manly-Warringah Sea Eagles from 1987 until his retirement at the end of 1992, becoming captain of Manly in 1990, as well as winning the 1987 Winfield Cup with the Sea Eagles.

== Rugby union ==
Raised in Canberra, O'Connor attended Phillip College. He was selected and toured with the undefeated Australian Rugby Union Schoolboys tour of Europe and Japan in 1977-78 alongside the likes of the Ella brothers Mark, Glen and Gary, as well as Queenslanders Wally Lewis and Chris Roche. His club rugby career was with the Canberra Royals and then Brisbane club, Teachers-Norths. He was first selected for the Wallabies in 1979.

With a number of those players, he was a young starter in the 1980 Wallaby side that won the Bledisloe Cup in Sydney in the 3rd and deciding game that year. O'Connor scored a try in this game, marking his ascendancy in representative rugby and coinciding with a rebirth of Australian rugby and the beginning of a golden period through to the Grand Slam achievement of 1984.

He made 13 Wallaby appearances at Centre up till the July 1982 Test against Scotland.

== Rugby league ==
=== St. George 1983–86 ===
O'Connor switched to rugby league, signing with New South Wales Rugby Football League premiership side St George in 1983.

He made his First Grade debut from the bench for the Dragons in Round 3 of the 1983 season against Western Suburbs at Kogarah Oval, scoring a try. O'Connor, who would go on to be a goal kicker of note and would notch up almost 1,500 points in his club and representative career, did not kick a goal for St. George during his first two seasons at the club, with coach Roy Masters preferring Steve Gearin and Steve Rogers in the role (unlike O'Connor who was one of the newer style around-the-corner kickers, Gearin and Rogers were both front on kickers that often led to less accuracy). Following their departure from the club after 1984 (where O'Connor and 24 test veteran Rogers played in the Dragons' Reserve Grade Grand Final side that lost to Balmain), O'Connor would be the Dragon’s first choice goal kicker in 1985, kicking 81 goals on his way to 189 points for the season (also scoring 6 tries and kicking 3 field goals).

O'Connor was part of St. George's 1985 Grand Final team that lost to Canterbury-Bankstown in front of 44,569 at the SCG. O'Connor kicked the only goal for the Dragons, a conversion of a "Slippery" Steve Morris try as they went down in a thriller 6–7. A field goal by Bulldogs winger Andrew Farrar was the difference between the two sides.

==== Representative ====
O'Connor made his representative debut when he was selected for City Firsts for the annual City vs Country game in 1985. After impressing with 3 goals and his general play in City's 18–12 win over Country Firsts at Newcastle's International Sports Centre, O'Connor was selected to make his State of Origin debut for New South Wales in Game 1 of the 1985 State of Origin series. Heavy rain confronted the players at Lang Park when the teams took the field for the opening match of the series. O'Connor scored two tries and kicked five goals to finish with all 18 of the Blues' points.

A week before he was selected for NSW for the first time, O'Connor was hit in an accidental high tackle from Canterbury-Bankstown's Steve Mortimer in a club match at Belmore, leaving him with a broken nose (and contributing to his nickname of "Snoz"). The Bulldogs half-back was cited over the incident, but received support from O'Connor at the league judiciary when he concurred with Mortimer's explanation that his arm had come up from off the ball when he made the tackle and that there was no intent of a high shot. During Game 2 of the 1985 State of Origin series at the Sydney Cricket Ground, O'Connor kicked 4 goals and his only field goal in Origin football as NSW won 21–14 in front of the then biggest crowd in Origin history of 39,068 fans.

Following his performances for NSW in the first two games of the 1985 Origin series, O'Connor was selected for the mid-season tour of New Zealand. Though he didn't play in a test match, he did play in the minor games of the short tour. Controversy reigned in early 1987 following the release of a biography of Australian and Queensland captain Wally Lewis titled "King Wally", in which 1985 NSW and Australian coach Terry Fearnley had been quoted as allegedly saying about O'Connor during the 1985 tour: "Can't play. No Heart. Lucky he can kick goals or he wouldn't be here".

O'Connor's international rugby league debut in the first test of the mid-season Trans-Tasman series against New Zealand on 6 July 1986 at Auckland's Carlaw Park saw him become Australia's 37th dual code rugby international, following Ray Price and preceding Ricky Stuart. Playing on the Wing, O’Connor kicked 3 goals in a 22-8 Australian win. He then went on to kick 4 goals as Australia wrapped up the two match series 2–0 with a 29–12 win at the SCG. With his natural pace and great side-step, many of his international rugby league appearances were on the wing, such was the depth of Australia's three-quarter talent with players like Gene Miles, Brett Kenny, Mal Meninga, Dale Shearer, Tony Currie, Andrew Ettingshausen and Mark McGaw available to the selectors during his era, though he did play most of his State of Origin career in his preferred centre position.

O'Connor was a selection for the 1986 Kangaroo Tour and played in all 6 tests on tour, including the pre-tour test against Papua New Guinea in Port Moresby, where he scored 22 points from 2 tries and 7 goals in a 62–12 win. He was the leading scorer on tour for the Kangaroos, with 170 points from 13 tries and 59 goals from his 14 games played.

O'Connor scored a personal tally of 44 points in the 3-0 Ashes series victory over Great Britain, including 22 in the first test at Old Trafford where he scored 3 tries and kicked 5/9 goals in tricky conditions. He then played the final two tests on tour against a hapless French side, scoring 20 points (3 tries, 4 goals) in the 44-2 first test win at Perpignan and 16 points (1 try, 6 goals) in the 52-0 second test win at Carcassonne.

=== Manly-Warringah 1987-92 ===
Before the end of the 1986 NSWRL season, O'Connor signed with the Bob Fulton-coached Manly-Warringah club.

O'Connor started playing for Manly from 1987 and starred in their 18-8 1987 NSWRL season's Grand Final win over the Canberra Raiders O'Connor scored 14 of Manly's 18 points with a try in the second half (and a perfect 5/5 goal kicking. Following the 1987 grand final victory he travelled with the champion Manly side to England for the 1987 World Club Challenge against the 1986–87 RFL champions, Wigan at their home ground, Central Park. In front of 36,895, Wigan won an ultimately try-less game 8–2, with Manly's only points coming from a penalty goal from O'Connor. Despite being Manly's first choice kicker for the Grand Final, O'Connor generally shared the kicking duties with Hooker Mal Cochrane and only scored 129 points for the season in 21 games (Cochrane scored 138 from 25 games).

At the end of the 1992 Winfield Cup season, as captain of Manly, O'Connor announced his retirement from playing. O'Connor was rated the 50th best Australian rugby league footballer of all time in a Rugby League Week Special in 1992.

==== Representative ====
During 1987, O'Connor played both in the centres and on the wing for New South Wales in their 2-1 State of Origin series loss to Queensland where he scored 2 tries and kicked 5 goals for the series. He was then selected to play on the wing in Australia's 13–6 loss to New Zealand in the one-off test at Lang Park. In 1987, there was a 4th 'Exhibition' State of Origin game played in August. This game was played in Long Beach, California at the Veterans Memorial Stadium. Playing in the centres, O'Connor scored 1 try and kicked 5 goals for the Blues who won convincingly 30–10.

O'Connor scored tries in all three matches of the 1988 State of Origin series, which Queensland won 3-0 for the first time, despite two of the three games being played in Sydney. On 20 July 1988 O'Connor played on the wing for Australia in their record 62-point win over Papua New Guinea, scoring four tries and kicking 7 goals to set a new record for most points scored by an individual in international rugby league. Of his 18 tests, O'Connor only played three games at centre, all three during the 1988 Ashes series against the Great Britain Lions following the international retirement of Kenny, and the unavailability of both Miles and Meninga with injury. He was then chosen at centre for the Ashes series against the touring Great Britain side, the Australians winning the series 2–1.

Following the end of the 1988 season in which Manly were bundled out in the semi-finals, O'Connor and Dale Shearer were the only Manly players chosen for Australia's World Cup Final team to play New Zealand at Eden Park in Auckland. O'Connor (playing on the wing) kicked 4/7 goals as Australia won 25-12 to win their 5th Rugby League World Cup.

During the 1989 NSWRL season, O'Connor was selected for Game 3 of the 1989 State of Origin series, which saw Qld record its second straight 3-0 series win, and 8th straight game win in a row, with a 36–16 win at Lang Park. Following this he was selected for Australia's mid-season tour of New Zealand where he played in all three Trans-Tasman Tests against the Kiwis as the Bob Fulton coached Aussies won 3–0.

O'Connor's last test for Australia was in 1990. Playing on the wing on a freezing night at the Pioneer Oval in Parkes (NSW), O'Connor, as did the other Australian goal kickers used (captain Mal Meninga, an on début Laurie Daley, and former Manly teammate Dale Shearer), had an off-night with the boot, missing all three of his conversion attempts. Injury then ruled him out of the test against New Zealand in Wellington two months later.

Following the 1990 NSWRL season, in which he had taken over the captaincy of the Sea Eagles following Paul Vautin's move to Eastern Suburbs, O'Connor ruled himself out of contention for the 1990 Kangaroo Tour because of a recurring hamstring injury.

O'Connor is remembered in State of Origin folklore for a sideline conversion for NSW in teeming rain only minutes out from the final siren to win the 2nd game of the 1991 State of Origin series 14–12 win over Qld at the Sydney Football Stadium. Despite no longer being the regular kicker for Manly due to the signing of goal kicking former All Blacks fullback Matthew Ridge, and despite the presence in the NSW team of regular club kickers Greg Alexander (Penrith) and Rod Wishart (Illawarra), Blues coach Tim Sheens gave the kicking duties to O'Connor for the series and his lack of match kicking practice showed, kicking only 3/9 for the series, all three goals coming in Game 2 in Sydney. The 1991 Origin series was the last time Michael O'Connor represented NSW.

During the third and final game of the 1991 State of Origin series, O'Connor was hit in a high tackle from Queensland centre Mal Meninga in the sixth minute, leaving him with a broken nose and two black eyes. Despite the riot act being read to both teams after a fiery Game 2, the NSWRL failed to cite Meninga for the incident and O'Connor was forced to accept an apology from him (at the time Meninga was the reigning Australian captain and there was the Trans-Tasman series against New Zealand starting a month later).

=== St Helens ===
O'Connor and Manly captain Paul Vautin travelled to England to play for the Alex Murphy coached St. Helens for a short spell during 1988–89, but his performances were largely disappointing, culminating in the side's 27–0 1989 Challenge Cup Final defeat at Wembley Stadium against Wigan. It was the first time in Cup Final history that a team had been held scoreless. O'Connor took Dave Tanner's place from the side that had played in the 16–14 Semi-final victory over Widnes.

== Post-playing career ==
O'Connor served as head coach of the Australian men rugby sevens team from 2008 to 2014. He coached the team to a silver medal at the Rugby sevens at the 2010 Commonwealth Games.
