= Ashley Gilbert =

Australian rugby league footballer

Personal information
- Full name: Ashley Gilbert
- Born: 28 November 1962 (age 63) Crookwell, New South Wales, Australia

Playing information
- Position: Lock, Second-row
Club
| Years | Team | Pld | T | G | FG | P |
|---|---|---|---|---|---|---|
| 1982–90 | Canberra Raiders | 129 | 41 | 0 | 0 | 163 |
| 1988–89 | Oldham | 22 | 4 | 0 | 0 | 16 |
| | Total | 151 | 45 | 0 | 0 | 179 |
Representative
| Years | Team | Pld | T | G | FG | P |
| 1988 | NSW Country | 1 | 0 | 0 | 0 | 0 |
- Source: As of 28 February 2019

Ashley Gilbert (born 28 November 1962) is an Australian former professional rugby league footballer who played in the 1980s and 1990s. Gilbert played for Canberra in the NSWRL competition and also for Oldham R.L.F.C. Gilbert was a foundation player for Canberra playing in the club's first ever season.

== Background ==
Gilbert was born in Crookwell, New South Wales and played in the local country competitions before signing with Canberra.

== Playing career ==
In 1982, Gilbert joined newly admitted Canberra and played in the club's first ever season. Canberra would only go on to win 4 games in 1982 and finished last on the table claiming the wooden spoon. As of 2026, this is the only time that Canberra has finished last.

In 1987, Gilbert played 24 games for Canberra and featured in the club's first finals campaign and grand final. Gilbert played in Canberra's 18-8 grand final loss to Manly-Warringah at the Sydney Cricket Ground which was also the last grand final to be played at the venue.

Gilbert went on to play with Oldham R.L.F.C. in England between 1988 and 1989 during the NSWRL off season. He also made his one and only representative appearance for NSW Country in 1988.

Gilbert missed out on playing in Canberra's premiership winning teams of 1989 and 1990 due to injury. Gilbert retired at the end of 1990 with his last game in first grade being against Penrith in Round 15 1990.
