= Chris Kinna =

Australian rugby league footballer

Personal information
- Full name: Christopher Kinna
- Born: 8th March, 1968; Melbourne
- Height: 180 cm (5 ft 11 in)
- Weight: 90 kg (198 lb; 14 st 2 lb)

Playing information
- Position: Wing
Club
Years	Team	Pld	T	G	FG	P
1984–89	Canberra Raiders	51	13	0	0	52
- Source: As of 9 April 2019

Chris Kinna is an Australian former professional rugby league footballer who played in the 1980s. He played for the Canberra Raiders in the New South Wales Rugby League premiership (NSWRL) competition.

== Early life ==
Chris Kinna was born in Melbourne, Victoria, and prior to taking up rugby league in school at age 12 at Copland College in Canberra in 1980 had played Australian rules football in Victoria.

== Playing career ==
Kinna made his first grade debut for Canberra against Western Suburbs in Round 19 1983 at Seiffert Oval. Kinna then became a regular on the wing for Canberra and played in the club's maiden grand final appearance in 1987. Canberra went into the game as underdogs which was proven to be true as Manly won the 1987 NSWRL grand final 18–8. This was the last grand final to be played at the Sydney Cricket Ground.

In his last 2 seasons with Canberra, Kinna only managed 4 appearances and he retired at the end of 1989.
