= Ged Byrne =

English rugby league footballer

Personal information
- Full name: Gerard Byrne
- Born: 14 June 1962 (age 63)

Playing information
- Position: Wing, Centre, Stand-off
Club
Years	Team	Pld	T	G	FG	P
1981–87	Salford	169	84	0	0	311
1987–90	Wigan	107	25	0	0	100
1990–91	Wakefield Trinity	33	10	0	0	40
1991–93	Oldham	28	7	0	0	28
1993–94	Workington Town	41	7	0	0	28
	Total	378	133	0	0	507
Representative
Years	Team	Pld	T	G	FG	P
1989	Lancashire	1	0	0	0	0

Ged Byrne (born 14 June 1962) is a former professional rugby league footballer who played in the 1980s and 1990s. He played at club level for Salford, Wigan, Wakefield Trinity, Oldham and Workington Town, as a wing, centre, or stand-off.

== Playing career ==
Byrne started his career at Salford. In 1987, he left Salford to join Wigan for a fee of £40,000.

Byrne made his début for Wigan in the 44-12 victory over Halifax in the Charity Shield during the 1987–88 season at Okells Bowl, Douglas, Isle of Man on 23 August 1987, he scored his first try for Wigan in the 26-8 victory over Station Road, Swinton on 6 September 1987, he scored his last try in his last match for Wigan was the 34-6 victory over Leigh at Central Park, Wigan on 16 April 1990.

=== World Club Challenge ===
Ged Byrne was a substitute in Wigan's 8-2 victory over Manly-Warringah Sea Eagles in the 1987 World Club Challenge at Central Park, Wigan on Wednesday 7 October 1987.

=== Championship appearances ===
Ged Byrne played in Wigan's victory in the Championship during the 1989–90 season.

=== Challenge Cup Final appearances ===
Ged Byrne was a substitute in Wigan's 32-12 victory over Halifax in the 1988 Challenge Cup Final during the 1987–88 season at Wembley Stadium, London on Saturday 30 April 1988.

=== County Cup Final appearances ===
Ged Byrne played as a substitute (replacing Wing Joe Lydon in the 76th minute) in Wigan's 22-17 victory over Salford in the 1988 Lancashire Cup Final during the 1988–89 season at Knowsley Road, St. Helens on Sunday 23 October 1988.

=== John Player Trophy Final appearances ===
Ged Byrne played stand-off in Wigan's 12-6 victory over Widnes in the 1988–89 John Player Special Trophy Final during the 1988–89 season at Burnden Park, Bolton on Saturday 7 January 1989.
