= Bronko Djura =

Australian rugby league footballer

Personal information
- Full name: Bronko Djura
- Born: 10 October 1964 (age 60); Sydney, New South Wales

Playing information
- Position: Fullback, Five-eighth
Club
| Years | Team | Pld | T | G | FG | P |
|---|---|---|---|---|---|---|
| 1984–86 | South Sydney | 44 | 9 | 11 | 0 | 58 |
| 1987 | St. George Dragons | 16 | 3 | 39 | 0 | 90 |
| 1988–89 | South Sydney | 35 | 2 | 21 | 1 | 77 |
| 1991 | Western Suburbs | 1 | 1 | 0 | 0 | 4 |
| | Total | 96 | 15 | 71 | 1 | 229 |

Bronko Djura (born 10 October 1964) is an Australian former rugby league footballer who played in the 1980s and 1990s. He played for South Sydney, St. George and Western Suburbs in the New South Wales Rugby League (NSWRL) competition.

== Background ==
Djura who is of Croatian descent was a Newtown junior but after their expulsion from the league was graded with South Sydney. He represented the Australian schoolboys in both rugby league and cricket.

== Playing career ==
Djura made his first grade debut for Souths against Manly-Warringah in round 20 1984 at Brookvale Oval. Souths finished the 1984 season in 5th place on the table and qualified for the finals. Djura featured in all 3 of the club's finals matches.

In 1986, Djura finished as South Sydney's top try scorer as the club finished second on the table behind minor premiers Parramatta. Djura played in both of the club's finals matches as they were defeated in consecutive weeks.

In 1987, Djura joined St George and finished as the club's top point scorer as they finished 9th and missed out on the finals. Djura returned to Souths for the 1988 season and in 1989 was part of the side which won the minor premiership. Djura played in the club's preliminary final defeat against eventual premiers the Canberra Raiders.

In 1991, Djura joined Western Suburbs but only featured in one game for the club in which he scored a try against Cronulla-Sutherland in round 13 1991. This would be Djura's last game in the top grade.
