= Mark Ellison (rugby league) =

Australian rugby league footballer

Personal information
- Full name: Mark James Ellison
- Born: 17 February 1964 (age 61); Stanmore, New South Wales

Playing information
- Position: Lock, Five-eighth, Second-row
Club
| Years | Team | Pld | T | G | FG | P |
|---|---|---|---|---|---|---|
| 1984 | South Sydney | 15 | 4 | 3 | 1 | 23 |
| 1985–86 | Cronulla-Sutherland | 17 | 1 | 7 | 0 | 18 |
| 1987–90 | South Sydney | 70 | 6 | 161 | 8 | 354 |
| 1991 | St. George Dragons | 5 | 1 | 6 | 0 | 16 |
| | Total | 107 | 12 | 177 | 9 | 411 |

Mark Ellison is an Australian former rugby league footballer who played in the 1980s and 1990s. He played for South Sydney, St. George and Cronulla-Sutherland in the New South Wales Rugby League (NSWRL) competition.

== Playing career ==
Ellison made his first grade debut for South Sydney in round 10 1984 against Canterbury-Bankstown at Belmore Oval. In his debut season, Ellison played for Souths in their finals campaign as they reached the minor semi final against St. George which they lost 24–6.

In 1985, Ellison signed with Cronulla-Sutherland and spent two years with the club but was limited to only playing 17 games. Ellison then returned to Souths for the 1987 season.

In 1987, Ellison finished as South Sydney's top point scorer and played in the club's humiliating 46-12 minor semi final loss against the Canberra Raiders at the Sydney Cricket Ground. The following year, Ellison finished as Souths top point scorer but they missed out on playing in the finals series.

In 1989, Ellison featured heavily in the Souths team which won the minor premiership and finished as the club's top point scorer for a third year in a row. In 1990, Ellison was limited to only a handful of games as Souths finished last on the table and claimed the wooden spoon.

In 1991, Ellison joined St. George but only managed to make 5 appearances in his only season there. His last game in the top grade came in round 21 1991 against North Sydney which finished in a 12–12 draw at Kogarah Oval.
