= Ian Barkley =

Australian rugby league player

Personal information
- Born: 8 August 1961 (age 64)

Playing information
- Position: Second-row, lock, centre, winger
Club
Years	Team	Pld	T	G	FG	P
1981–83	Eastern Suburbs	59	19	0	0	66
1984–88	Manly Warringah	26	6	0	0	24
	Total	85	25	0	0	90

Ian Barkley (born 8 August 1961) is a former Australian professional rugby league player. Although primarily a second-row forward, he also played as a lock, centre and winger. Barkley made 84 appearances and scored 25 tries in the NSWRL for the Eastern Suburbs (1981–83) and Manly Warringah (1984–88).
