= David Smith (rugby league, born 1967) =

Australian rugby league footballer

Personal information
- Full name: David Smith
- Born: 11 April 1967 (age 57)

Playing information
- Position: Centre, Wing
Club
Years	Team	Pld	T	G	FG	P
1987–91	Eastern Suburbs	74	19	120	1	317
1993–94	Newcastle Knights	13	2	0	0	8
	Total	87	21	120	1	325

David Smith (born 11 April 1967) is a former rugby league footballer who played in the 1980s and 1990s. He played for the Eastern Suburbs Roosters from 1987 to 1991 and the Newcastle Knights from 1993 to 1994, as a goal-kicking centre or winger.
