= Mark Pocock =

Australian rugby league footballer

Personal information
- Full name: Mark Pocock
- Born: 19 October 1958 (age 67) Sydney, New South Wales, Australia

Playing information
- Position: Second-row, Prop
Club
Years	Team	Pld	T	G	FG	P
1985–89	Manly Sea Eagles	61	1	0	0	4
- Source: As of 10 April 2019

Mark Pocock nicknamed "Poey" is an Australian former professional rugby league footballer who played in the 1980s. He played for Manly-Warringah in the New South Wales Rugby League (NSWRL) competition.

== Background ==
Pocock was a Parramatta junior who played for Nerang and Norths Devils before signing with Manly-Warringah in 1985.

== Playing career ==
Pocock made his first grade debut for Manly against Western Suburbs in Round 2 1985 at Lidcombe Oval. Pocock scored his one and only try for Manly against Eastern Suburbs in Round 9 1987.

Pocock played 18 times for Manly in 1987 as the club reached the grand final against the Canberra Raiders. Pocock was dropped to the bench to make way for English prop Kevin Ward. Manly-Warringah went on to win the premiership 18–8 after leading for the entire match. The grand final was also the last one to be played at the Sydney Cricket Ground.

Pocock remained with Manly until the end of the 1989 season before retiring as a player.
