= Mark Cannon (rugby league) =

Australian rugby league player

Personal information
- Born: 25 March 1961 (age 63); New South Wales, Australia

Playing information
- Position: Five-eighth, Fullback, Centre, Lock
Club
Years	Team	Pld	T	G	FG	P
1982–85	St. George Dragons	20	3	4	0	17
1983–84	→Wigan	33	21	0	0	84
1984	→Barrow	6	7	0	0	28
1986–89	North Sydney Bears	55	16	0	13	77
	Total	114	47	4	13	206

Mark Cannon (born 25 March 1961) is an Australian former professional rugby league footballer who played for the North Sydney Bears and the St. George Dragons in the 1980s.

== Rugby league career ==
A utility back, Cannon played his early rugby league in Lismore and was an Australian Schoolboys representative.

From 1982 to 1985 he played for St. George, where he was used as a five-eighth. Most of his first-grade appearances came in his debut season but in 1983 he featured in St. George's minor preliminary final win over Balmain.

While at St. George he played two seasons in England with Wigan and in the 1983-84 tournament helped Wigan reach its first Challenge Cup final since 1970, which they went on to lose to Widnes, with Cannon as five-eighth.

In his final year with St. George in 1985 he was a member of the club's reserves premiership winning team.

Cannon crossed to North Sydney in 1986 and was a regular fixture in the first-grade side for his first two seasons. In addition to five-eighth, he also played at North Sydney as centre, fullback and lock. He later served as a North Sydney assistant coach.
