= Mark Brokenshire =

Australian rugby league footballer

Personal information
- Born: 28 February 1961 (age 64); Murwillumbah, New South Wales, Australia
- Height: 186 cm (6 ft 1 in)
- Weight: 105 kg (16 st 7 lb)

Playing information
- Position: Prop
Club
Years	Team	Pld	T	G	FG	P
1987–88	Manly Sea Eagles	24	0	0	0	0
1990–94	Canterbury Bulldogs	79	0	0	0	0
	Total	103	0	0	0	0
Representative
Years	Team	Pld	T	G	FG	P
1986	NSW Country	1	0	0	0	0

Mark Brokenshire (born 28 February 1961) is an Australian former professional rugby league footballer who played for Manly and Canterbury-Bankstown in the NSWRL competition during the 1980s and 1990s.

== Playing career ==
Brokenshire started his first grade career at Manly in 1987 but was not a part of the grand final winning team of that season.

In 1990, Brokenshire moved to Canterbury and played in the 1994 grand final defeat against the Canberra Raiders.

Brokenshire retired at the end of 1994 and went his entire first grade career without scoring a try.
