= Jeremy Ticehurst =

Australian rugby league footballer

Personal information
- Full name: Jeremy Ticehurst
- Born: 5 April 1965 (age 59); Sydney, New South Wales, Australia

Playing information
- Position: Wing
Club
Years	Team	Pld	T	G	FG	P
1987–88	Manly-Warringah	24	6	0	0	24
1989	Parramatta	13	3	0	0	12
1990	Gold Coast Seagulls	11	1	0	0	4
1991	Manly-Warringah	1	0	0	0	0
	Total	49	10	0	0	40
- Source: As of 27 January 2023

Jeremy Ticehurst is an Australian former professional rugby league footballer who played in the 1980s and 1990s. He played for Manly-Warringah, Parramatta and the Gold Coast Seagulls in the NSWRL competition.

== Playing career ==
Ticehurst made his first grade debut for Manly in round 4 of the 1987 NSWRL season against defending premiers Parramatta at Brookvale Oval. Ticehurst came off the bench in a 26–4 victory. Ticehurst would play 14 games for Manly in 1987 as the club claimed their fifth premiership defeating Canberra in the grand final. Ticehurst played in one of the clubs finals matches against Eastern Suburbs but missed out selection for the decider. On 7 October 1987, Ticehurst played in Manly's World Club Challenge loss to Wigan. After a further season with Manly, Ticehurst joined rivals Parramatta where he played one year. In 1990, he joined the newly renamed Gold Coast side who had previously been known as the Gold Coast-Tweed Giants. In 1991, he returned to Manly where he managed one further game in the top grade.
