= Paul Shaw (rugby league) =

Australian rugby league footballer

Personal information
- Full name: Paul Shaw
- Born: 4 October 1965 (age 60) Wellington, New South Wales, Australia

Playing information
- Position: Halfback
Club
Years	Team	Pld	T	G	FG	P
1986–89	Manly Sea Eagles	33	3	0	0	12
1988–89	Salford	20	2	0	0	8
1990–91	Gold Coast Seagulls	28	1	0	0	4
1994	Manly Sea Eagles	1	0	0	0	0
	Total	82	6	0	0	24
- Source: As of 10 April 2019

Paul Shaw (born 4 October 1965) is an Australian former professional rugby league footballer who played in the 1980s and 1990s. He played for Manly-Warringah and Gold Coast in the New South Wales Rugby League (NSWRL) competition and for Salford in England.

== Background ==
Shaw played junior rugby league for Wellington in the New South Wales country competition before signing with Manly.

== Playing career ==
Shaw made his first grade debut for Manly against South Sydney in Round 12 1986 at Brookvale Oval. Shaw mainly played from the bench in 1986 and 1987 as an understudy to Des Hasler.

Shaw played 12 times for Manly in 1987 as the club reached the grand final against the Canberra Raiders. Manly-Warringah went on to win the premiership 18-8 after leading for the entire match with Shaw coming off the bench. The grand final was also the last one to be played at the Sydney Cricket Ground.

In 1988, Shaw signed with English club Salford and played with them during the off season in Australia. Shaw was man of the match in Salford's 1988 Lancashire Cup final defeat. In 1990, Shaw signed with the Gold Coast Seagulls becoming a regular starter in a struggling side. Shaw's final season at the Gold Coast in 1991 ended with the club finishing last on the table and claiming the wooden spoon. Shaw played 14 games during that season which were all losses.

In 1994, Shaw returned to first grade rugby league in 1994 and played in one game for Manly against the Parramatta Eels. This would be his final game before retiring. In 1996 Shaw played for the Aboriginal team in the World Rugby League Sevens Tournament.
