= Paul Vautin =

Australia rugby league footballer, coach and pundit (born 1959)

Fatty Vautin
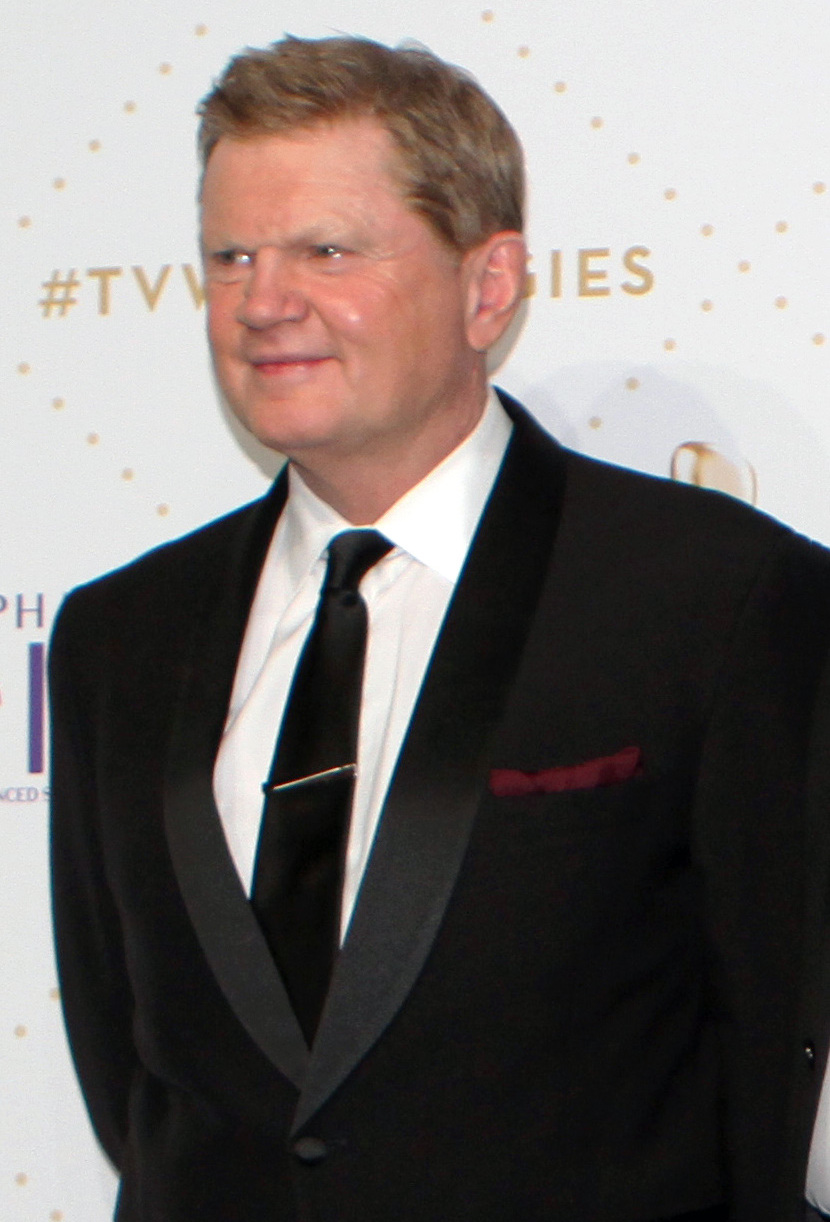

Personal information
- Full name: Paul Vautin
- Born: 21 July 1959 (age 67) Brisbane, Queensland, Australia

Playing information
- Height: 176 cm (5 ft 9 in)
- Weight: 90 kg (14 st 2 lb)
- Position: Lock, Second-row
Club
Years	Team	Pld	T	G	FG	P
1978	Wests Brisbane	22	3	14	0	37
1979–89	Manly-Warringah	204	20	2	2	74
1988–89	St. Helens	21	4	0	0	16
1990–91	Eastern Suburbs	34	1	0	0	4
	Total	281	28	16	2	131
Representative
Years	Team	Pld	T	G	FG	P
1978	Brisbane Colts	1	0	0	0	0
1982–90	Queensland	22	2	0	0	7
1982–89	Australia	13	0	0	0	0
1984	NSW City	1	0	0	0	0

Coaching information
Representative
Years	Team	Gms	W	D	L	W%
1992	Brisbane Capitols	5	5	0	0	100
1995–97	Queensland	9	4	0	5	44

Paul Vautin (born 21 July 1959), nicknamed Fatty, is an Australian former rugby commentator and former professional rugby league player, captain and coach. He has provided commentary for the Nine Network's coverage of rugby league since joining the network in 1992 and also hosted The Footy Show from its beginnings in 1994 opposite co-host Peter Sterling, until 2017. An Australian Kangaroos Test and Queensland State of Origin representative lock or second-row forward, Vautin played club football in Brisbane with Wests, before moving to Sydney in 1979 to play with Manly-Warringah, whom he would captain to the 1987 NSWRL premiership. He also played for Sydney's Eastern Suburbs, and in England for St Helens.

After playing, Vautin became a sports commentator for the Nine Network, calling rugby league games alongside Ray Warren and the recently retired Peter Sterling. Later, during the Super League war, he was hired to coach Queensland in the 1995 State of Origin series and took the Maroons to an upset 3–0 whitewash of series favourite New South Wales.

After 46 years in the public eye having started his first grade career in 1978, Paul Vautin announced his retirement from commentating for channel 9 on 1 December 2024.

== Playing career ==
Vautin made his name in the late 1970s. He played for the Wests Panthers in the Brisbane Rugby League premiership, the Manly-Warringah Sea Eagles in Sydney, St. Helens in England, Queensland in the State of Origin and the Australia national rugby league team. He finished his playing career with Sydney club the Eastern Suburbs Roosters in 1991.

=== Club ===
==== Wests Panthers ====
He was graded as an 18-year-old by Brisbane Rugby League club Wests as a Lock in 1978, sometimes playing opposite another talented young lock from Valleys destined for future greatness as a Five-eighth named Wally Lewis. That year he got his first taste of senior representative football when he was chosen on the bench for the Brisbane Colts who played the touring New Zealand side at Lang Park.

Vautin was signed by Manly-Warringah club secretary Ken Arthurson in late 1978 after Arthurson had viewed a tape of him scoring a 75-metre try from a scrum for Wests at Lang Park, and moved from Brisbane to play for the defending NSWRFL premiers starting in 1979.

Before signing with Manly, Vautin had offers from both Cronulla-Sutherland, and North Sydney whose coach, former Great Britain (and Cronulla) halfback Tommy Bishop actually visited the Vautin home in Brisbane and made an offer of AU$7,500 per season (according to Vautin, at the time he was on $100 per game with Wests Panthers). His father wished him to sign for Norths as it was more money than even he made as a train driver, but the Panthers got their hooks into it wanting money for their investment into Vautin and put a $6,000 transfer fee on their teenage back rower, which made Norths pull their offer. Within two days Vautin had signed with Manly for $6,000 per season who were more than happy to pay the transfer fee. According to Vautin, he told his father that he would probably last three years in Manly's reserve grade before coming back to resume his career with Wests.

==== Manly-Warringah Sea Eagles ====
After arriving in Sydney, Vautin did not impress Manly coach Frank Stanton (who at the time was also the City Firsts & Seconds, New South Wales and Australian Test coach), with his level of fitness which was OK for Brisbane football, but not for the Sydney Premiership. It was only when taken with the first grade squad to a pre-season tournament in Newcastle at the insistence of Ken Arthurson that Vautin finally started to make Stanton take notice by being among Manly's top tacklers in the games he played. From there Vautin, who had since earned the nickname "Fatty" from former Manly dual Premiership winning captain Fred Jones, was selected on the bench for Manly's Craven Mild Cup pre-season games against Norths, Souths and Western Suburbs.

After playing Reserve Grade for Manly in the opening round of the 1979 season, against St. George at Kogarah Oval, Vautin was chosen on the bench for First Grade, going on early when tough-tackling Terry Randall came off injured. Although the reigning premiers ultimately lost 9–34 to that seasons eventual Premiers, Vautin played well enough to be called upon to take Randall's place in the side over the coming weeks, playing second row until Igor returned from injury in Round 6, then moving to his preferred lock for the remainder of the season.

Vautin went on to play in grand finals with Manly in 1982 and 1983, going down to Parramatta both times. In 1983 he was the Dally M Second Rower of the Year and the Dally M Representative Player of the Year.

Vautin was named captain of Manly-Warringah in 1985 by coach Bob Fulton.

Vautin enjoyed success in leading Manly to an 18–8 victory over the Canberra Raiders in the 1987 Grand Final, the last played at the Sydney Cricket Ground. Before the 1987 season had started, the Manly club board had wanted Bob Fulton to install 1986 Kangaroo tour second rower Noel Cleal as club captain, replacing Vautin who had captained the side since 1985. Vautin won the Dally M Captain of the Year award for 1987.

Following the grand final victory in 1987, he traveled with Manly to England for the 1987 World Club Challenge against their champions, Wigan. The home side won a try-less game 8–2 at Central Park. During the match, Vautin was tackled over the sideline in front of the main grandstand. After easily being the best side in the Sydney competition during the year, and after the unbeaten 1986 Kangaroo tour of Great Britain and France, the Manly players later admitted to over-confidence and took the game far too lightly, treating the trip more as a holiday than anything serious and actually continued their grand final celebrations while in England.

==== St. Helens ====
Vautin and Manly teammate Michael O'Connor both signed to play for the Alex Murphy coached St. Helens during the 1988–89 Rugby Football League season on 2 August 1988. Vautin would go on to captain St. Helens in his last match for them, a 27–0 loss to Wigan in the 1989 Challenge Cup Final played on 29 April 1989 at Wembley Stadium in front of 78,000 fans. It was the first time since 1952 that a team had been held scoreless. Vautin played 21 games for St. Helens in 1988–89 and made his début in English club rugby on 9 October 1988 in a 30–22 win over Hull Kingston Rovers at Craven Park in Hull.

==== Eastern Suburbs Roosters ====
He signed with the Eastern Suburbs Roosters for two years, where he even spent time in reserve grade after being dropped by coach Mark Murray - a former Queensland and Australian teammate, before retiring at the end of the 1991 NSWRL season. His last game for the out of contention Roosters was an 8–42 loss to eventual premiers Penrith at the Sydney Football Stadium on 25 August, the final round of the season.

=== State of Origin ===
Vautin made his Origin début for the Maroons in game 2 of the 1982 series.

In 1984, Vautin and Manly teammate Chris Close became the last Queensland representative players to be selected for the annual NSW City vs NSW Country game, when he was selected in the second row for NSW City for the game at the SCG, won 38–12 by City.

For the next nine years, he played for Queensland with the exception of 1986 when he missed 3 months of the 1986 season after breaking his arm against Penrith in Round 8 of the season at Brookvale Oval.

Game 1 of the 1990 series was Vautin's last game of State of Origin as he was dumped after Queensland lost 0–8 to NSW after having won both the previous two series 3–0.

=== International ===
Four years after making his senior representative debut against the touring 1978 Kiwis at Lang Park, Vautin made his test début for Australia in 1982 in the first test against New Zealand at Lang Park in Brisbane under the coaching of his original Manly coach Frank Stanton (who by that time was coaching Balmain). However, after playing for Queensland and Australia, and helping Manly to second on the ladder and then into the grand final against minor premiers Parramatta, he was not selected for the end of season 1982 Kangaroo tour (that team became the first to go through Great Britain and France undefeated, earning the nickname "The Invincibles"). His then Manly captain and the captain of the 1982 Kangaroos, Max Krilich, later told that a comment Vautin had made earlier in 1982 about it being a greater honour to play for Queensland than it was Australia "may" have cost him a place on the Kangaroo Tour.

He returned to the test team for Australia's mid-season tour to New Zealand in 1983, and in 1984 was selected for the second Ashes Test against Great Britain at Lang Park, copping an accidental elbow to the face from replacement Mick Adams as he tackled the Lions forward, resulting in a fractured cheekbone during the 18–6 win which saw Australia retain The Ashes. Vautin's injury kept him out of the third test at the Sydney Cricket Ground, and caused him to miss 11 games of the 1984 NSWRL season.

Vautin played 13 test matches during his career, touring New Zealand twice in 1985 and 1989. In addition to the thirteen tests he played for Australia, he played two tour games in New Zealand in 1985 and three tour games in 1989.

Vautin was selected for Australia in their successful 1988 Ashes series against the Great Britain tourists. He then played from the bench in Australia's record 70–8 win in their final 1985–1988 Rugby League World Cup round game over Papua New Guinea in Wagga Wagga, but despite some good end of season form for Manly ultimately missed selection for the World Cup Final where Australia defeated New Zealand 25–12 at the Eden Park stadium in Auckland.

Vautin was the vice-captain of Australia's mid-season tour of New Zealand in 1989, captaining the team in three tour games (Wally Lewis was the tour and test captain). Vautin captained the Australian team (now coached by Bob Fulton) to a 50–18 win over a New Zealand XIII at the Palmerston North Showgrounds in the opening game of the tour. He would later captain the side in another tour game against Auckland for the only loss of the tour, the Australians surprised 26–24 at Carlaw Park (the Kangaroos first non-test loss since the Bob Fulton captained, Frank Stanton coached 1978 Kangaroo tourists lost to 10–11 Widnes), before captaining the team from the unfamiliar position of Five-eighth for a 28–10 win over Wellington at the Basin Reserve.

During his career, Vautin often had to compete with players such as Ray Price, Wayne Pearce and fellow Queenslander Bob Lindner for the Australian Lock-forward position, and as such was often selected in the second row. Of his 13 test matches, Vautin played 7 in the second row, 5 at lock and one, the win over PNG in 1988, from the bench. His final test, a 22–14 win over New Zealand at the Mount Smart Stadium in Auckland in the first game of the 1989–1992 World Cup, saw him wearing his favoured No.13 (lock) jumper.

== Coaching career ==
Loyal to his Channel Nine employer, Vautin was a vocal supporter of the Kerry Packer-backed Australian Rugby League during the Super League war which started in 1995. With only limited coaching experience having coached the Brisbane Capitols to the Winfield State League championship in 1992 (winning all 5 games), he was considered an inferior replacement for dual premiership winning coach Wayne Bennett who was originally named to return as coach of the 1995 Queensland State of Origin team (Bennett had previously coached the Maroons from 1986 to 1988), and with Queensland having lost the last three consecutive series and being given a handful of young and inexperienced players, Vautin and Queensland were expected to be easy prey for NSW, who could still boast almost half a side of international players as well as Origin and dual premiership winning coach Phil Gould. However, his representative coaching début took a fairy tale turn when the young Maroons, without any of the stars from Super League-aligned clubs (most notably the Wayne Bennett coached Brisbane Broncos), completed a 3–0 series whitewash of New South Wales that year.

With the Super League players available for selection in the 1996 State of Origin series, Queensland were rated a chance of retaining their crown but lost the series 0–3. After losing the 1997 series 1–2, Vautin was replaced as Queensland coach the following year by Wayne Bennett.

== Post–rugby league career ==
In 2000, Vautin was awarded the Australian Sports Medal for his contribution to Australia's international standing in the sport of rugby league.

=== Commentary ===
After Manly had been knocked out of the finals series, Paul Vautin made his television commentary début during the 1988 NSWRL Grand Final with the ABC alongside long time caller David Morrow. Vautin's introduction to television commentary did not go to plan though as he thought they were pre-recording the introduction to the game and dropped the "F-bomb", only to find out that it was in fact being broadcast live around Australia.

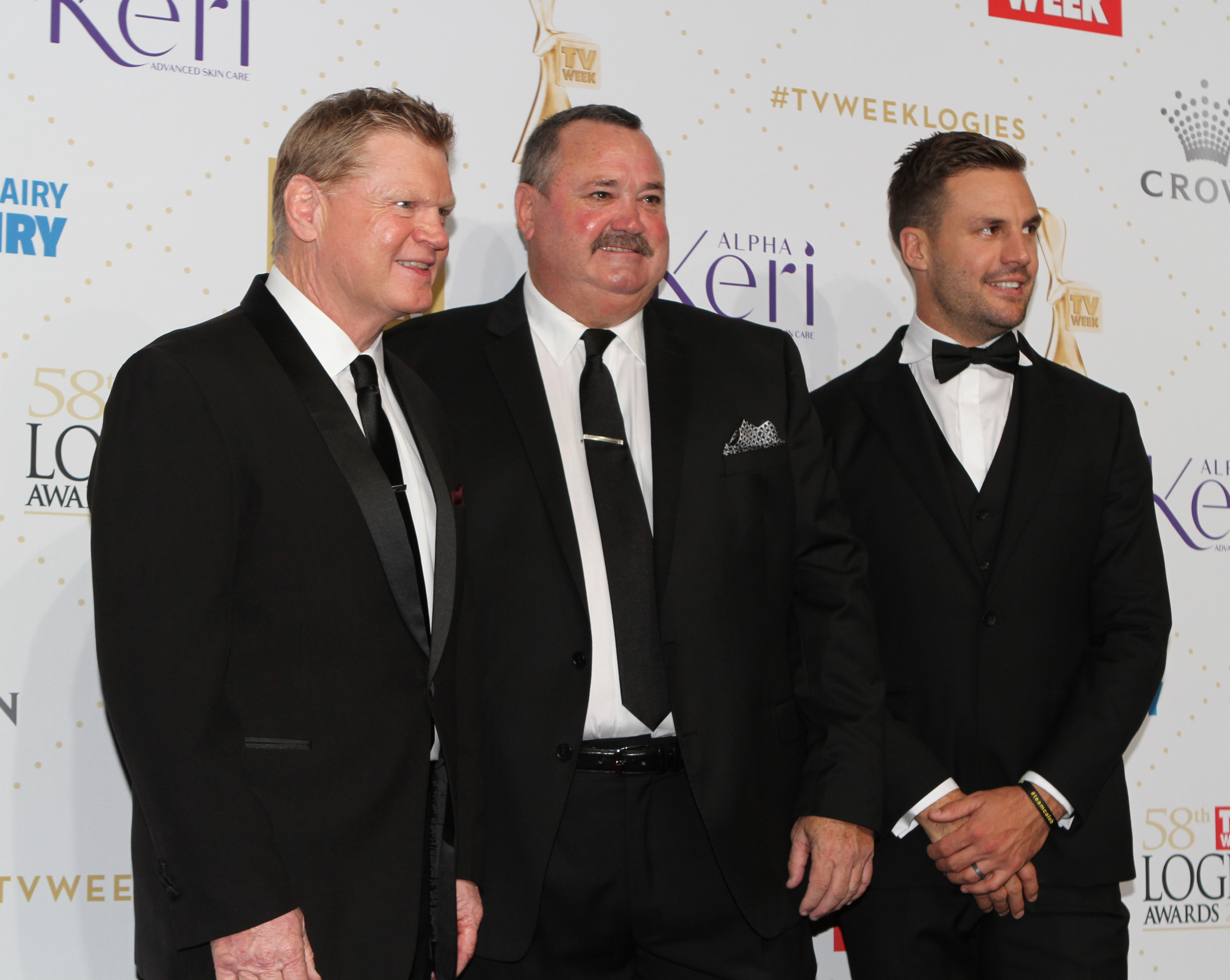
Paul Vautin (on the left) with Darryl Brohman and Beau Ryan at 2016 TV Week Logie Awards

Vautin was then signed by the Nine Network and has been a regular commentator for Nine's Wide World of Sports' coverage of rugby league matches alongside Ray Warren and Peter Sterling since 1992.

Tim Brasher actually fell over in front of Tony Smith. He's hit every limb, Rabs – all five of 'em came out and he's brought down Tony Smith...

— Paul Vautin commentating during the 1995 Rugby League World Cup Final at Wembley Stadium.

On 1 December 2024, Vautin announced this retirement from commentating, thus ending his tenure at Channel 9. He had claimed that he had 'run out of petrol' but was known for some of his comments towards the direction that the game was going in, especially during the 2024 State of Origin series.

=== The Footy Show ===
Vautin has hosted The NRL Footy Show since 1994, propelling him to TV stardom. He suffered a serious concussion in 2005 filming for the show in a segment called "Dare-Devil Dudes", when he hit his head on concrete. He did not host for a period of about 10 weeks.

From 1992 to 2004, he was a mainstay of the Channel Nine match commentary team along with Peter Sterling and Ray Warren, calling club, Origin and international games. Since the concussion incident, he had focussed on his Footy Show appearances but was still part of the broader Nine expert commentary team for big fixtures like the State of Origin.

Speculation existed that 2017 would be Vautin's last season as host of The Footy Show. In October 2017, Vautin was axed from The Footy Show.

== Sources ==
- Colman, Mike (1992) Fatty: The Strife and Times of Paul Vautin, Ironbark Press, Sydney
- Vautin, Paul: Turn It Up! The life and thoughts of Paul "Fatty" Vautin; Pan Publishing, Sydney, 1995. A collection of articles Vautin has written between late 1993 (including his appearance and well-publicised catch in an all-stars cricket match in Queensland) and the end of 1993, covering some of his past and views on current events of the time.
- Andrews, Malcolm (2006) The ABC of Rugby League, Austn Broadcasting Corpn, Sydney
- Big League, State of Origin 25 Years Collectors Edition 1980–2005, News Magazines, Sydney
