= Stuart Davis (rugby league) =

Australian rugby league footballer

Personal information
- Full name: Stuart Davis
- Born: 4 December 1961 (age 64) Sydney, New South Wales, Australia

Playing information
- Position: Wing
Club
Years	Team	Pld	T	G	FG	P
1981–82	Manly Sea Eagles	29	8	0	0	32
1983	Eastern Suburbs	1	0	0	0	0
1984–89	Manly Sea Eagles	68	31	0	0	124
	Total	98	39	0	0	156
- Source: As of 11 April 2019

Stuart Davis, nicknamed "The Bug", is an Australian former professional rugby league footballer whose career spanned the 1980s. He played for Manly-Warringah and Eastern Suburbs in the New South Wales Rugby League (NSWRL) competition.

== Playing career ==
Davis made his first-grade debut for Manly against the Parramatta Eels in Round 11, 1981 at the Brookvale Oval. Davis scored a try in Manly's loss to Newtown in the 1981 preliminary final. In 1982, Davis made 17 appearances for Manly but was not selected in their grand final team which lost to Parramatta.

In 1983, Davis signed with Eastern Suburbs but only made one appearance for the Roosters before returning to Manly, where would again establish himself as a regular starter on the wing.

Davis played 16 games for Manly in 1987 as the club reached the grand final against the Canberra Raiders. Manly-Warringah went on to win the premiership 18-8 after leading for the entire game. Davis played on the wing during the match. This grand final was also the last one to be played at the Sydney Cricket Ground before it was moved to the newly-built Sydney Football Stadium.

Davis remained loyal to Manly over the next two years and retired at the conclusion of the 1989 season.
