= David Ronson =

Australian rugby league footballer

Personal information
- Full name: David Ronson
- Born: 13 January 1967 (age 59) Sydney, New South Wales, Australia

Playing information
- Position: Wing, Centre
Club
Years	Team	Pld	T	G	FG	P
1985–91	Manly Sea Eagles	101	34	2	0	140
1991–92	Hull FC	26	10	0	0	40
1994	Balmain Tigers	3	0	0	0	0
	Total	130	44	2	0	180
- Source: As of 10 April 2019

David Ronson is an Australian former professional rugby league footballer who played in the 1980s and 1990s. He played for Manly-Warringah and Balmain in the New South Wales Rugby League (NSWRL) competition and Hull FC in England.

== Playing career ==
Ronson, a Belrose Eagles junior, made his first grade debut for Manly against Canterbury-Bankstown in Round 16 1985 at the Sydney Cricket Ground scoring a try during a 16–12 loss. Ronson went on to become a regular starter for Manly on the wing and played nearly every game in 1986.

Ronson played 24 games for Manly in 1987 as the club reached the grand final against the Canberra Raiders. Manly-Warringah went on to win the premiership 18–8 after leading for the entire game. Ronson played on the wing during the match. The grand final was also the last one to be played at the Sydney Cricket Ground.

Ronson remained a first choice threequarter with Manly until departing the club at the end of the 1991 season. He spent then the 1991–92 season with English club Hull FC. Newcastle signed Ronson for the 1993 season, but he did not play any first grade and signed with Balmain, where he had a brief stint and played in a few first grade games.
