= Mal Cochrane =

Australian RL coach and rugby league footballer (born 1961)

Personal information
- Full name: Malcolm Edward Cochrane
- Born: 3 April 1961 (age 65) Taree, New South Wales, Australia

Playing information
- Position: Hooker
Club
Years	Team	Pld	T	G	FG	P
1982–90	Manly Sea Eagles	118	19	167	0	410
Representative
Years	Team	Pld	T	G	FG	P
1986	City Seconds	1	0	0	0	0
1987	Country Origin	1	0	3	0	6

Coaching information
Representative
Years	Team	Gms	W	D	L	W%
1996	Australian Aboriginals	0	0	0	0
- Source: RLP As of 20 March 2021

Mal Cochrane (born 3 April 1961) is an Indigenous Australian former professional rugby league footballer who played in the 1980s and 1990s. He played for the Manly-Warringah Sea Eagles in the New South Wales Rugby League premiership. Cochrane primarily played at hooker.

== Playing career ==
=== Junior career ===
Cochrane played hockey and cricket as well as rugby league while at school and represented his state in all three sports at schoolboy level.

Cochrane captained the Australian Schoolboys tour of England and France in 1979, scoring twelve tries and seven goals. He was also rated the best forward of the tour after playing at hooker, lock and prop. Cochrane also had enough speed in his schoolboys days that he occasionally played on the wing.

=== Senior career ===
Although he originally discussed a career with the Bulldogs following the 1979 tour, he instead signed with the Manly Sea Eagles, the club of his childhood hero Bob Fulton who, in 1983 would also become the Sea Eagles coach.

After biding his time in the Under 23's and reserve grade behind Australian Test and NSW Origin captain and hooker Max Krilich (also the Manly captain), and international forward Ray Brown, coach Bob Fulton gave Mal Cochrane his first grade debut for Manly in Round 16 of the 1983 NSWRFL season on 12 June. He played from the bench in the Sea Eagles 34–6 win over the Illawarra Steelers in front of 8,083 fans at Manly's home ground Brookvale Oval. He would play 5 first grade games (all from the bench) in 1983.

In 1986, Mal Cochrane won the Rothmans Medal and the Dally M Hooker of the Year awards and was considered unlucky not to be selected for the 1986 Kangaroo tour. During the year he earned his first representative jumper when he was selected at hooker to play for City Seconds.

Cochrane played in one grand final with Manly, the 1987 Grand Final against the Canberra Raiders in the last Grand Final to be played at the Sydney Cricket Ground. In front of 50,201 fans, Manly won the match 18–8, but after receiving an accidental knee to the head in the first half, Cochrane remembered nothing of the game. Following the grand final victory he traveled with Manly to England for the 1987 World Club Challenge against English champions, Wigan. In a try-less game, the home side shocked the Winfield Cup premiers 8–2 in front of 36,895 fans at Central Park. During 1987, Cochrane repeated as the Dally M Hooker of the Year winner and also played his second and last senior representative game when chosen to represent Country Origin, kicking 3 goals as Country were defeated 30–22 by their City Origin counterparts.

Injuries in the last years of Cochrane's first-grade career reduced his appearances to only 28 games over the final three seasons before retiring from first-grade at the end of the 1990 season. His final first grade game for Manly came in their 29–12 loss to Canberra at the WACA Ground in Perth, Western Australia in Round 9 on 18 May 1990.

Mal Cochrane played 118 games for the Manly-Warringah Sea Eagles from 1983 to 1990. He scored 19 tries and kicked 167 goals for a total of 410 points.

Following his retirement from top grade football, Cochrane then spent a year playing for the Young Cherrypickers in the NSW Group 9 competition.

== Post-playing career ==
In 1996, Cochrane coached the Australian Aboriginal rugby league team on their tour of Great Britain.

A policeman for ten years, Cochrane now works for the Public Service Association of New South Wales, assisting Indigenous Australians in the workplace and is a member of the National Rugby League Judiciary.

== Accolades ==
Cochrane was the first hooker to win the Rothmans Medal (awarded from 1968 to 1996), in 1986, and was considered unlucky to miss a spot on the 1986 Kangaroo Tour (Balmain's Benny Elias, a NSW State of Origin hooker in 1985, toured as the #2 behind Penrith's incumbent test rake Royce Simmons). Subsequent medal winning hookers include Danny Buderus and Cameron Smith. He was also awarded the Dally M Hooker of the Year in 1986 and 1987.

In 1987, Cochrane played hooker for Country Origin, kicking 3 goals in their 30–22 loss to City Origin in the annual City vs Country Origin game played at the Parramatta Stadium in Sydney. This would be his only game of senior representative football.

In August, 2008, Cochrane was named at hooker in the Indigenous Team of the Century.
