= Dale Shearer =

Australia international rugby league footballer

Personal information
- Full name: Dale Anthony Shearer
- Born: 25 July 1965 (age 61) St George, Queensland, Australia

Playing information
- Height: 180 cm (5 ft 11 in)
- Weight: 85 kg (13 st 5 lb)
- Position: Fullback, Wing, Centre, Five-eighth
Club
Years	Team	Pld	T	G	FG	P
1984	Mackay
1985–89	Manly-Warringah	86	45	5	1	191
1987–88	Widnes	14	6	11	0	46
1990–91	Brisbane Broncos	27	15	48	0	156
1992–94	Gold Coast Seagulls	33	3	17	2	48
1995–96	South Qld Crushers	10	5	1	0	21
1997	Sydney Roosters	11	2	0	0	8
1998	North Qld Cowboys	13	2	2	0	12
	Total	194	78	84	3	482
Representative
Years	Team	Pld	T	G	FG	P
1984–96	Queensland	26	12	6	0	56
1986–93	Australia	20	12	9	0	66

Dale Shearer (born 25 July 1965), also known by the nickname of "Rowdy", is an Australian former professional rugby league footballer who played in the 1980s and 1990s. A Queensland State of Origin and Australian international representative of Aboriginal heritage, he played club football in Queensland, New South Wales and England. His playing career included a NSWRL Premiership win with Manly-Warringah in 1987 and a Rugby League World Cup Final win in 1988. Ten years after his retirement, Shearer was still the all-time top try-scorer in State of Origin and he was named on the wing of the Indigenous Australian team of the century.

Shearer is a professional speaker who speaks about his time as a professional athlete, the challenges he has faced, mental health, and overcoming personal adversity. Shearer is an advocate for cancer awareness after losing his wife and father to cancer.

== Biography ==
Shearer was born in St George, Queensland.

=== Playing career ===
==== 1980s ====
At the age of 18, Shearer caught the attention of many people during his time at the Queensland club Sarina Crocodiles in the Winfield State League with some impressive performances. In 1984, Shearer played for the North Queensland Marlins in the Winfield State League, including playing on the wing for the Marlins in a 20–38 loss against the touring Great Britain Lions in Townsville. He was also a member of Mackay's second successful Foley Shield team, as well as representing Queensland in a match against New Zealand.

The Manly-Warringah Sea Eagles coach and rugby league Immortal, Bob Fulton, was quick to sign the 19-year-old before anyone else prior to the 1985 NSWRL season. Shearer made his debut for Manly in round 1 of the season against Penrith, before going on to make his State of Origin début for Queensland in the same year. Playing mostly on the wing or in the centres, Shearer played 22 games in his début season for Manly, scoring 8 tries. It would prove to be the most number of club games he would play in a season in his 14-year career. He scored his first try for Manly at their home ground, Brookvale Oval, in their 24–4 win over the reigning premiers Canterbury-Bankstown in round 3.

He made his test début on the wing for Australia in 1986 against New Zealand at Carlaw Park in Auckland, scoring a try on debut. Though an injury suffered in the game saw him unavailable for the final two tests against New Zealand at the Sydney Cricket Ground and Lang Park in Brisbane. His good form for Manly, Queensland and Australia saw him selected on the 1986 Kangaroo Tour where he played 13 games on tour, including two tests against Great Britain and two against France, scoring 12 tries. He scored a record four tries in the second test against France in the last match of the tour, in a then record 52–0 win.

Although played at either fullback or in the centres for Manly by Fulton, Shearer was picked on the wing for both Queensland and Australia in 1987, helping the Maroons to regain the State of Origin shield from New South Wales, and in Australia's shock 6–13 loss to New Zealand at Lang Park. He was Manly's starting fullback in their 18-8 Winfield Cup grand final win over the Canberra Raiders in the last ever grand final played at the Sydney Cricket Ground in 1987. Manly had finished the season as minor premiers with a 20-5-1 record (which included a 12-game winning streak), with Shearer playing 20 games (14 at fullback and 6 in the centres) and scoring a career high 13 tries to be the club's leading try scorer for the season. Following the grand final victory he travelled with Manly to England for the 1987 World Club Challenge against the English champions, Wigan, at Central Park.

In the following off-season he also played 14 games in the championship-winning Widnes team in England during the 1987–88 RFL championship. Shearer played for Manly until 1989

==== 1990s ====
Shearer joined the Brisbane Broncos. He was selected to play for Queensland in all three games of the 1990 State of Origin series at centre. Shearer was the 1990 Brisbane Broncos season's goal kicker. He was selected to go on the 1990 Kangaroo tour of Great Britain and France. Shearer was selected to play for Queensland from the interchange bench in the 1991 State of Origin series' 2nd and 3rd games. He was then selected to play for Australia in the first match of the 1991 Trans-Tasman Test series on the wing.

Shearer then joined the Gold Coast Seagulls. He was selected as Queensland's fullback for all three games of the 1992 State of Origin series. He played for Queensland at fullback in games 2 and 3 of the 1993 State of Origin series. Shearer was Australia's fullback and goal kicker in all three matches of the 1993 Trans-Tasman Test series. He played his last match for Australia in 1993. Shearer then joined the South Queensland Crushers. He was selected to play for Queensland at five-eighth in the 1995 State of Origin series. He played his last game for Queensland in 1996. Shearer later joined the Sydney Roosters. The 1998 North Queensland Cowboys season was Shearer's last.

=== Post-playing ===
In 2000, he was awarded the Australian Sports Medal for his "outstanding achievement in rugby league". In August 2008, Shearer was named at wing in the Indigenous Team of the Century, joining other legends such as Eric Simms, Steve Renouf, Lionel Morgan, Laurie Daley, Greg Inglis, Johnathan Thurston, Arthur Beetson, Cliff Lyons and John Ferguson in the team.

Shearer was critically injured in a car crash at Peregian Springs on 21 February 2009. The crash came one year after the death from cancer of his wife Delyse.

In 2010 Shearer faced bankruptcy when ordered to repay approximately $1.5m to former State of Origin teammate Adrian Lam for an outstanding loan which dated back to 2005.
