= Delroy =

Delroy or Delroi is a given name and a surname of Old French and Anglo-Norman origin.

== England ==
The name derived from the Old French del meaning "of the" and Roy or Roi, "king" ("of the king"). The etymology combines the elements del, which can be interpreted as belonging to or of, and roy, the king. It was a common variant of locational surnames from the British Isles and could signfy someone from the king's land.

== Caribbean ==
Delroy is a popular given name of the Caribbean and in Jamaica. Because Jamaica and other islands were under British rule for centuries, the English and Anglo-Norman name structures became standard. Names featuring the prefix De or Le were common across the British Isles and integrated into the Caribbean lexicon.

== Given name ==
=== People ===
- Delroy Allen (born 1954), retired Jamaican-American soccer goalkeeper
- Del Bryan (born 1967), British former boxer
- Delroy Cambridge (born 1949), Jamaican professional golfer
- Delroy Chuck, Jamaican lawyer, journalist and politician
- Delroy Clarke (born 1982), Canadian football cornerback
- Delroy Denton (born c. 1971, Jamaican gangster, rapist and suspected serial killer
- Delroy Edwards (refugee) (1959–2005), Jamaican-born refugee, refused political asylum in UK, killed by a gang following his return
- Delroy Facey (born 1980), British-Grenadian footballer
- Delroy Foster, a.k.a. Delly Ranx, Jamaican dancehall deejay and record producer
- Delroy Grant (born 1957), Jamaican-born British convicted serial rapist
- Delroy Leslie (born 1970), retired boxer from Jamaica
- Delroy Lindo (born 1952), British-born Jamaican American actor
- Delroy McLean (born 1972), birth name of Bitty McLean
- Delroy Parkes (fl. 1978), British retired boxer
- Delroy McQueen, 21st century English former weightlifter and powerlifter
- Delroy Morgan (born 1967), Jamaican cricketer
- Delroy Pearson (born 1970), British singer, member of the pop group Five Star
- Delroy Poyser (1962–2019), Jamaican retired long jumper
- Delroy Scott (1947–2018), Jamaican footballer
- Delroy Slowley, Jamaican politician elected in 2020
- Delroy Taylor (born 1975), Jamaican former cricketer
- Delroy Washington (1952–2020), Jamaican-British reggae singer
- Delroy Wilson (1948–1995), Jamaican ska, rocksteady and reggae singer

=== Fictional characters ===
- Delroy Garrett, a Marvel Comics superhero

== Surname ==
- Mick Delroy (born 1965), Australian former rugby league footballer
- Tony Delroy (born 1953), Australian radio presenter and host of Nightlife on ABC Local Radio

== Stage name ==
- Irene Delroy (Josephine Sanders, 1900–1985), American actress
- Delroy Edwards (Brandon Perlman, born 1990), American electronic music producer
