= 1986 NSWRL season =

Rugby league competition

1986 New South Wales Rugby League
- Teams: 13
- Premiers: Parramatta (4th title)
- Minor premiers: Parramatta (3rd title)
- Matches played: 163
- Points scored: 5212
- Total attendance: 1,705,156
- Top points scorer: Terry Lamb (210)
- Wooden spoon: Illawarra Steelers (2nd spoon)
- Rothmans Medal: Mal Cochrane
- Top try-scorer(s): Phil Blake (13); Garry Schofield (13)

The 1986 New South Wales Rugby League premiership was the seventy-ninth season of professional rugby league football in Australia. Thirteen clubs competed for the J J Giltinan Shield and Winfield Cup during the season, which culminated in a grand final between the Parramatta Eels and Canterbury-Bankstown Bulldogs which featured the introduction of the Clive Churchill Medal. This season, NSWRL teams also competed for the 1986 National Panasonic Cup. As of 2026, it marks the Parramatta Eels fourth premiership and their most recent title to date.

== Season summary ==
This season saw the opening of the new, 30,000 capacity Parramatta Stadium as the home ground for the Parramatta Eels and on 29 June the final game was played at the old Sydney Sports Ground: Eastern Suburbs Roosters v North Sydney Bears.

In total twenty-six regular season rounds were played from March till September, resulting in a top five of Parramatta, South Sydney, Canterbury-Bankstown (the defending premiers), Manly-Warringah and Balmain who battled it out in the finals (after Balmain had defeated North Sydney in a playoff for 5th spot). Parramatta completed a perfect season, winning the pre-season competition, the midweek Panasonic Cup, finishing the regular season as minor premiers, winning the grand final and farewelling their international long time stars Mick Cronin and Ray Price as victorious champions.

The 1986 season's Rothmans Medallist was Manly-Warringah hooker, Mal Cochrane. Parramatta's halfback, Peter Sterling won the Dally M Award as well as Rugby League Week's player of the year award. The Coca-Cola Rugby League Coach-of-the-Year award was given to George Piggins who took South Sydney to the finals in his first year as coach.

The new management and marketing direction that had been undertaken by the NSWRL in the 1980s meant that at the end of this season the League was able to announce a profit of $3.7 million and an increase in attendance of 22%.

23 of the 28 players selected to go on the 1986 Kangaroo tour of Great Britain and France at the end of the season were from the NSWRL. Like the Kangaroos of 1982 who went through their tour undefeated to earn the nickname "The Invincibles", the 1986 Kangaroos would also go through undefeated, earning the nickname "The Unbeatables"

=== Teams ===
The lineup of clubs remained unchanged from the previous year, with thirteen contesting the premiership, including five Sydney-based foundation teams, another six from Sydney, one from greater New South Wales and one from the Australian Capital Territory.

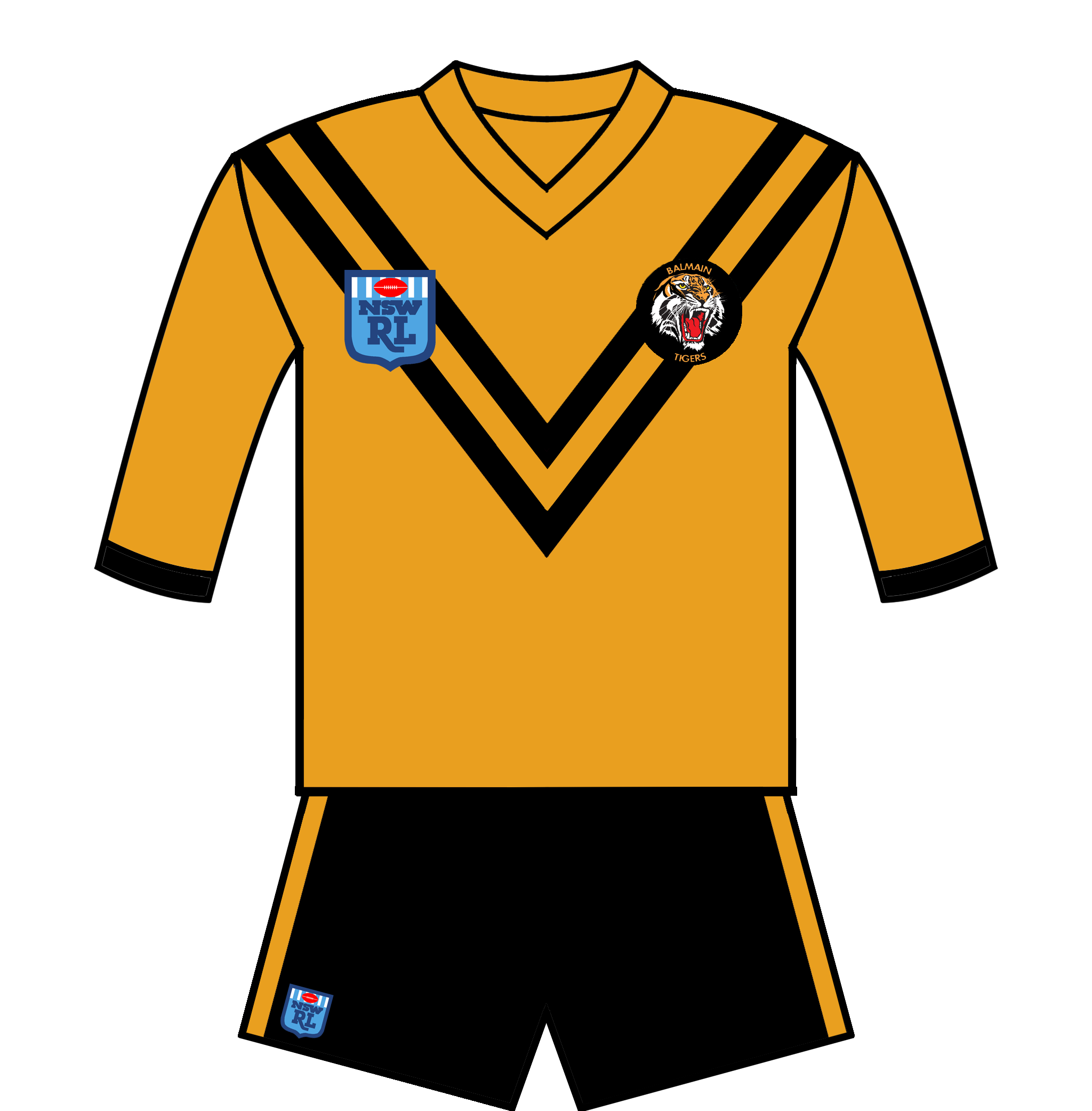
Balmain; Tigers 79th season Ground: Leichhardt Oval; Coach: Frank Stanton; Captain: Wayne Pearce

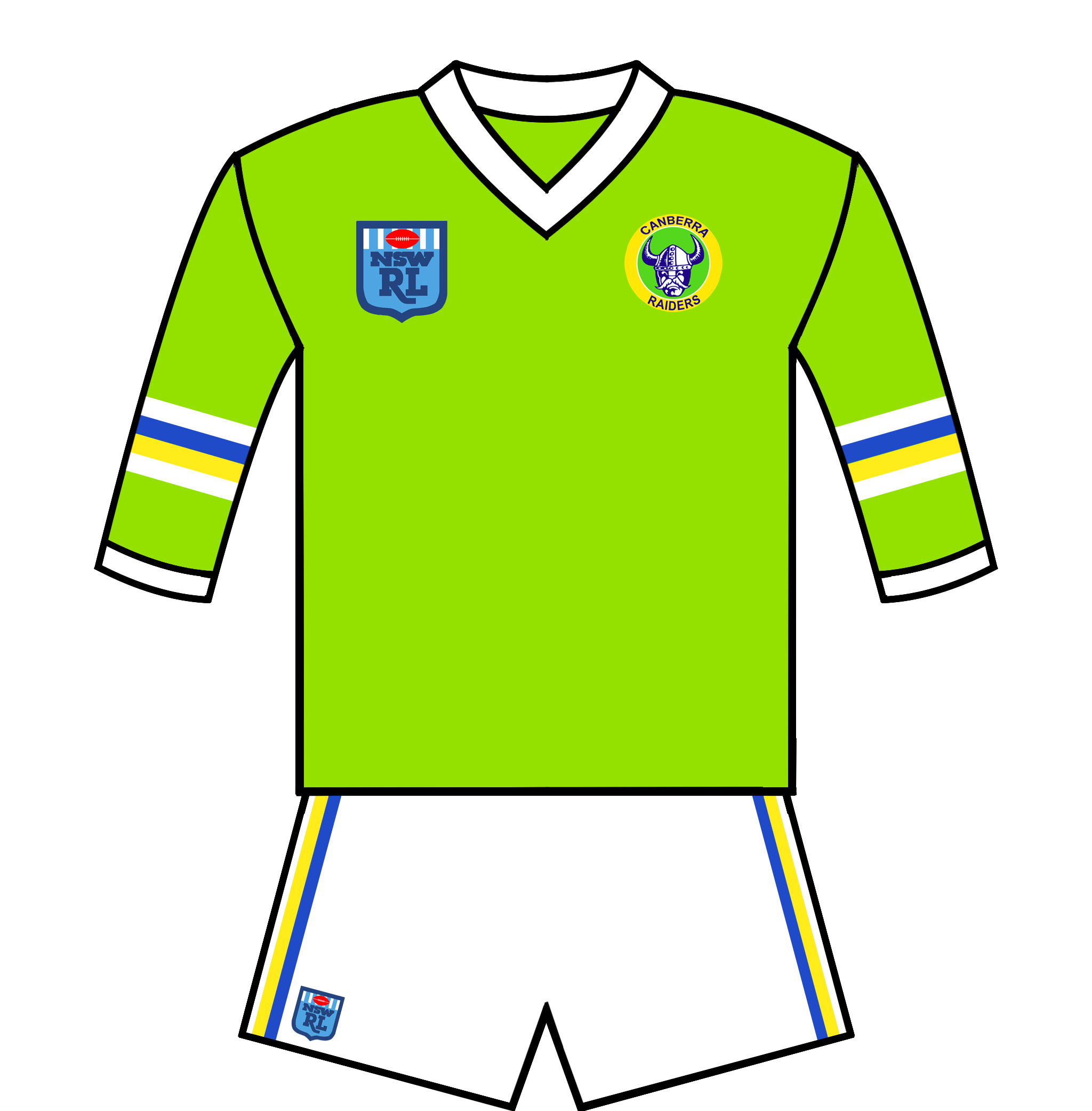
Canberra; Raiders 5th season Ground: Seiffert Oval; Coach: Don Furner; Captain: Dean Lance

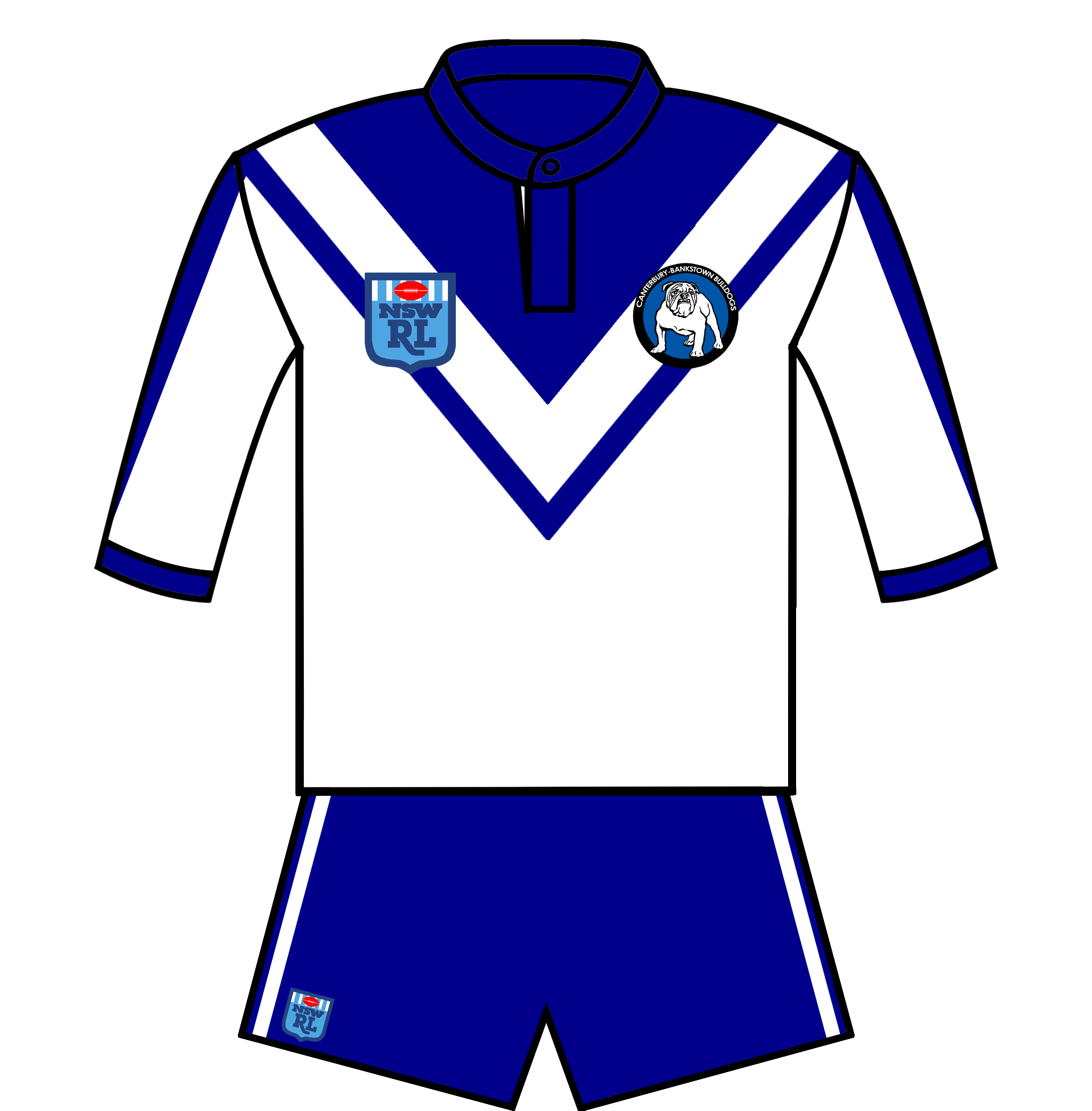
Canterbury-Bankstown; Bulldogs 52nd season Ground: Belmore Oval; Coach: Warren Ryan; Captain: Steve Mortimer

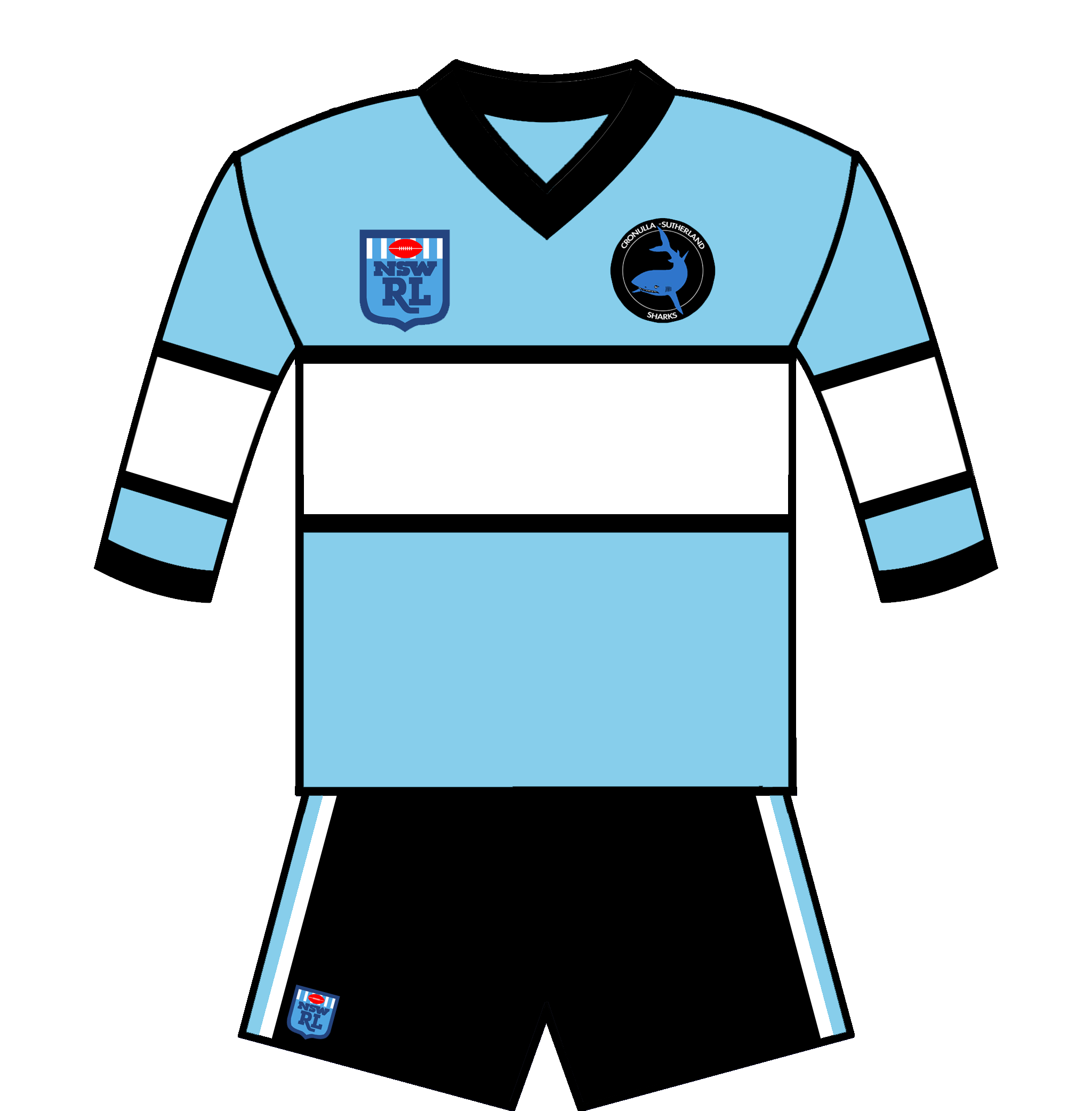
Cronulla-Sutherland; Sharks 20th season Ground: Ronson Field; Coach: Jack Gibson; Captain: David Hatch

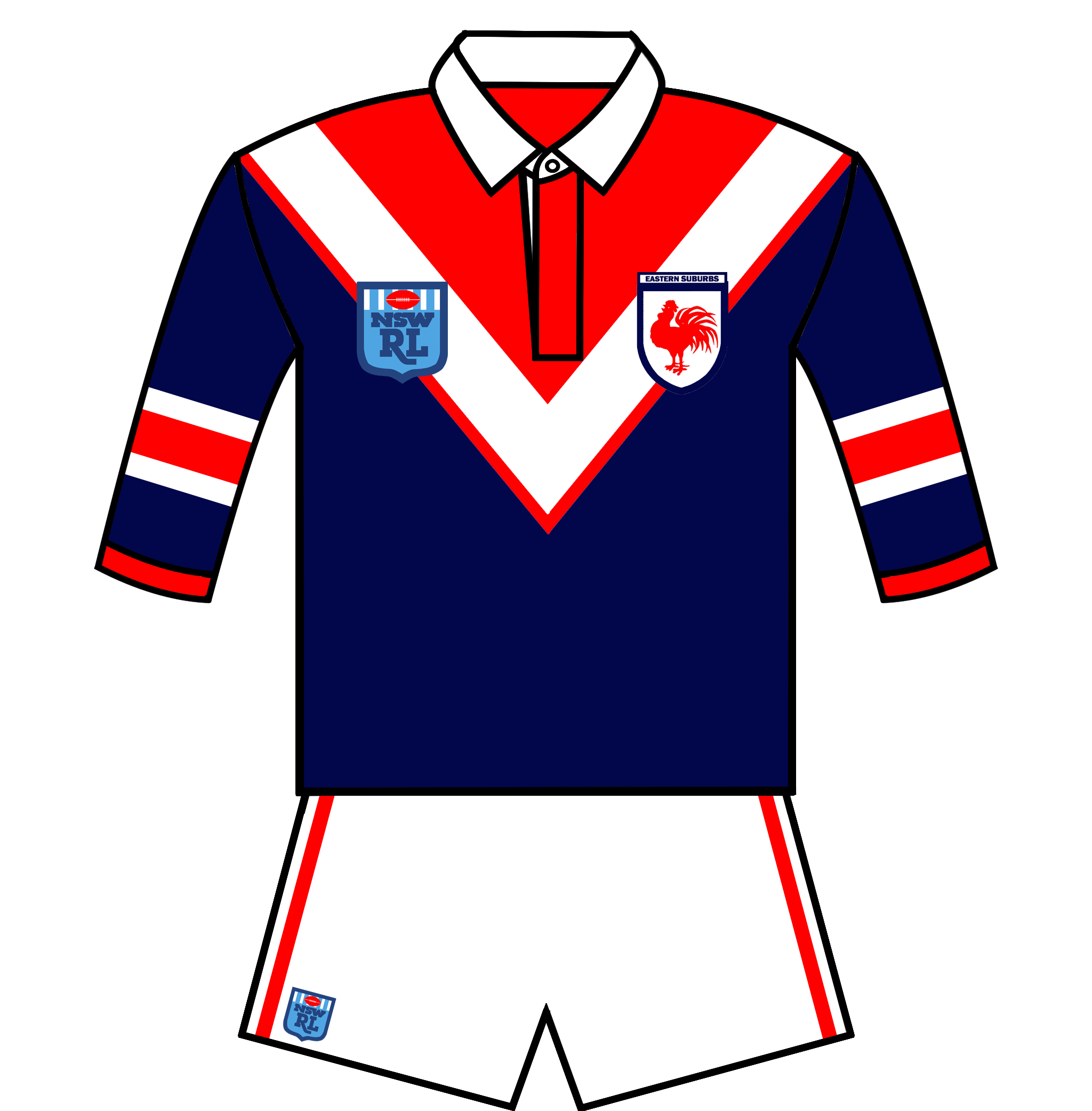
Eastern Suburbs; Roosters 79th season Ground: Sydney Sports Ground; Coach: Arthur Beetson; Captain: Hugh McGahan

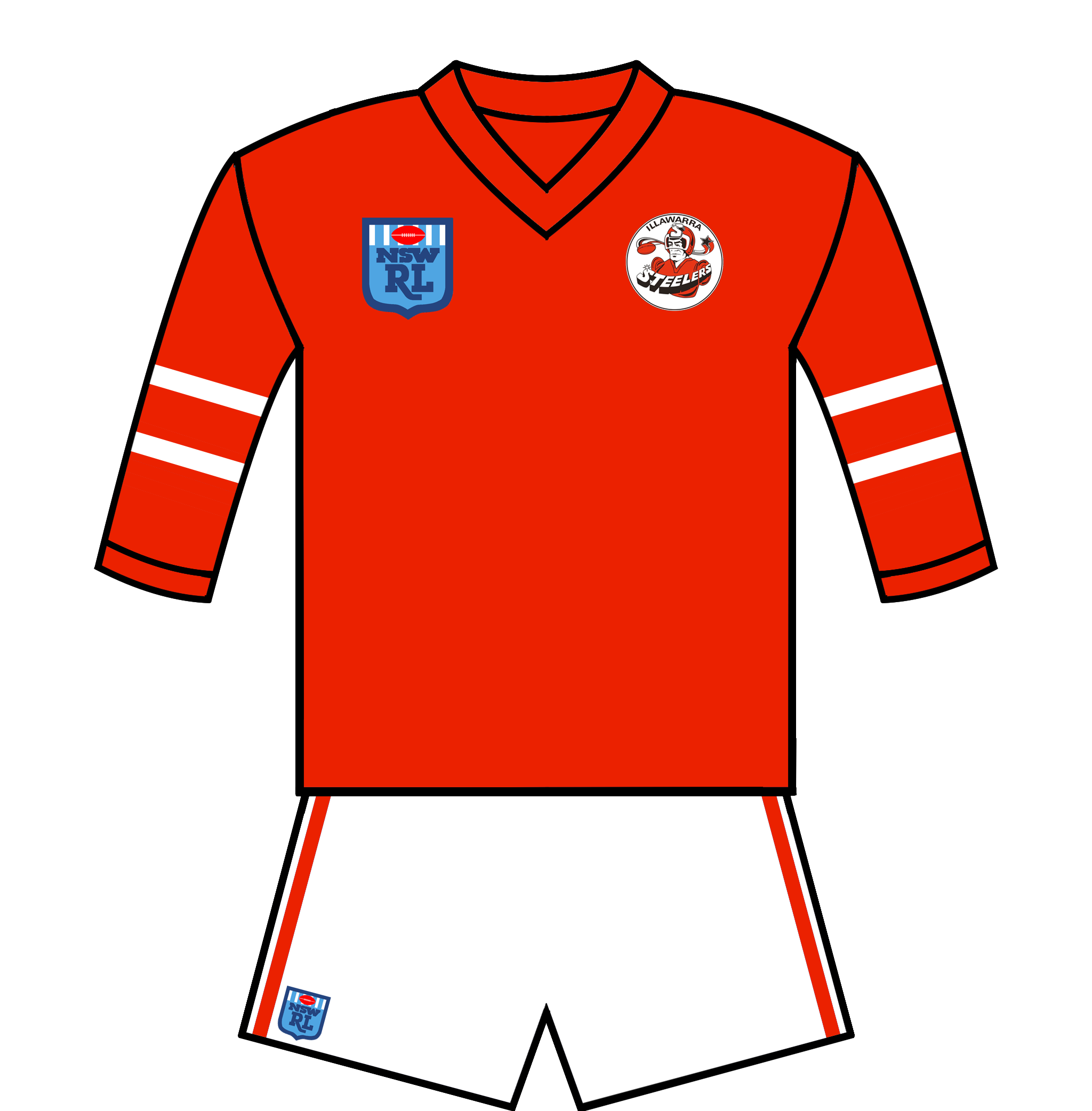
Illawarra; Steelers 5th season Ground: Wollongong Showground; Coach: Brian Smith; Captain: Brian Hetherington

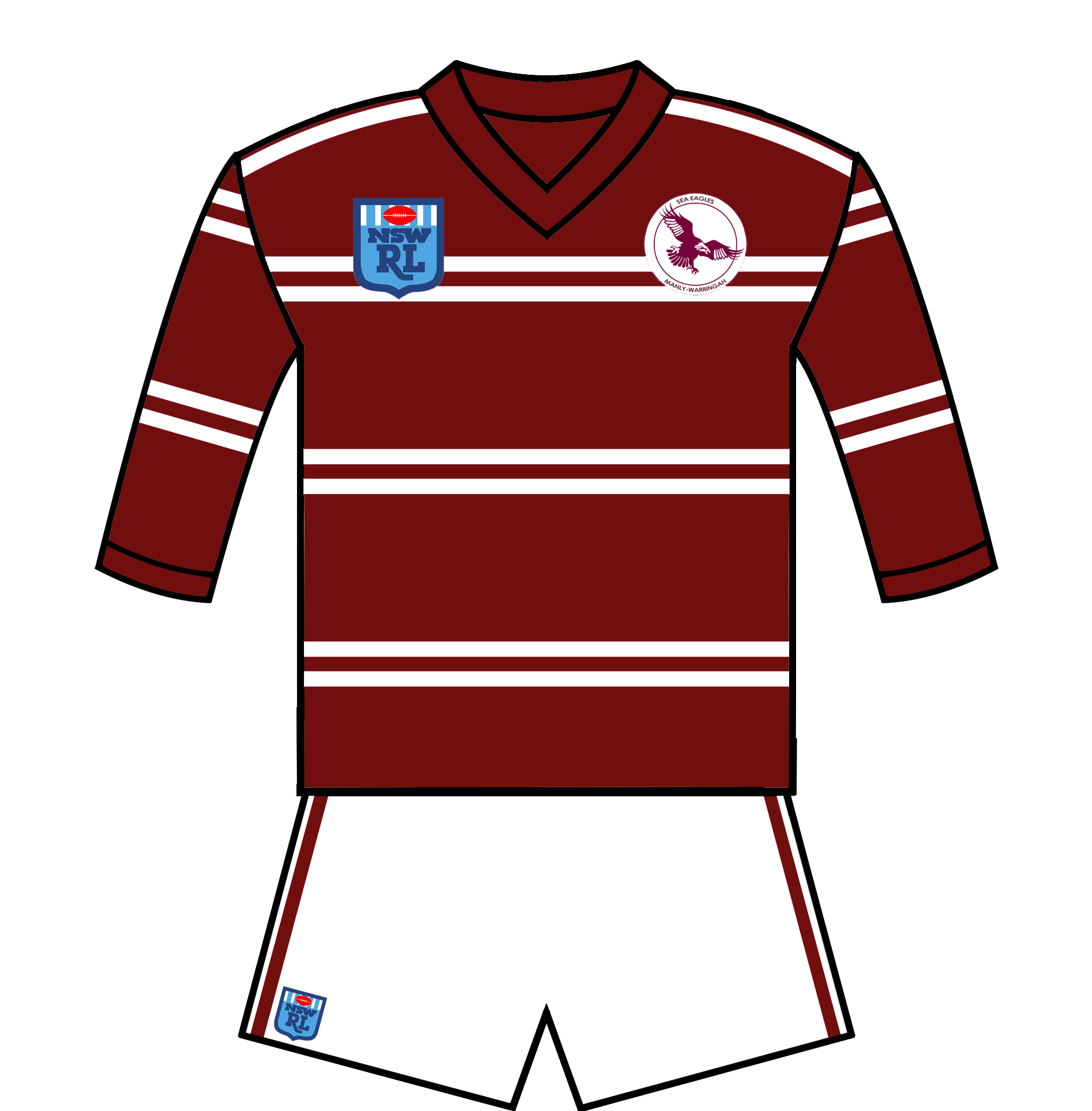
Manly-Warringah; Sea Eagles 40th season Ground: Brookvale Oval; Coach: Bob Fulton; Captain: Paul Vautin

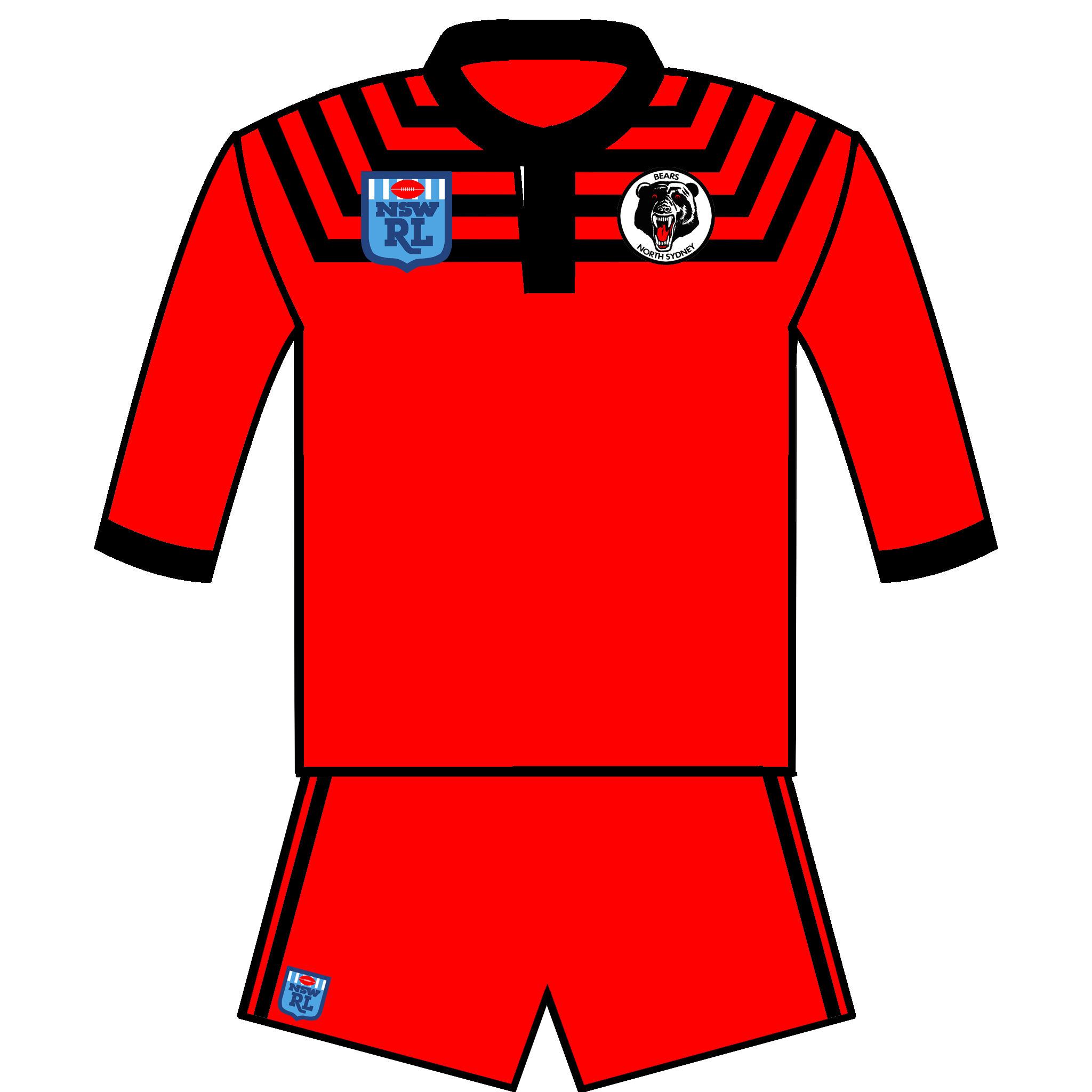
North Sydney; Bears 79th season Ground: North Sydney Oval; Coach: Brian Norton; Captain: Mark Graham

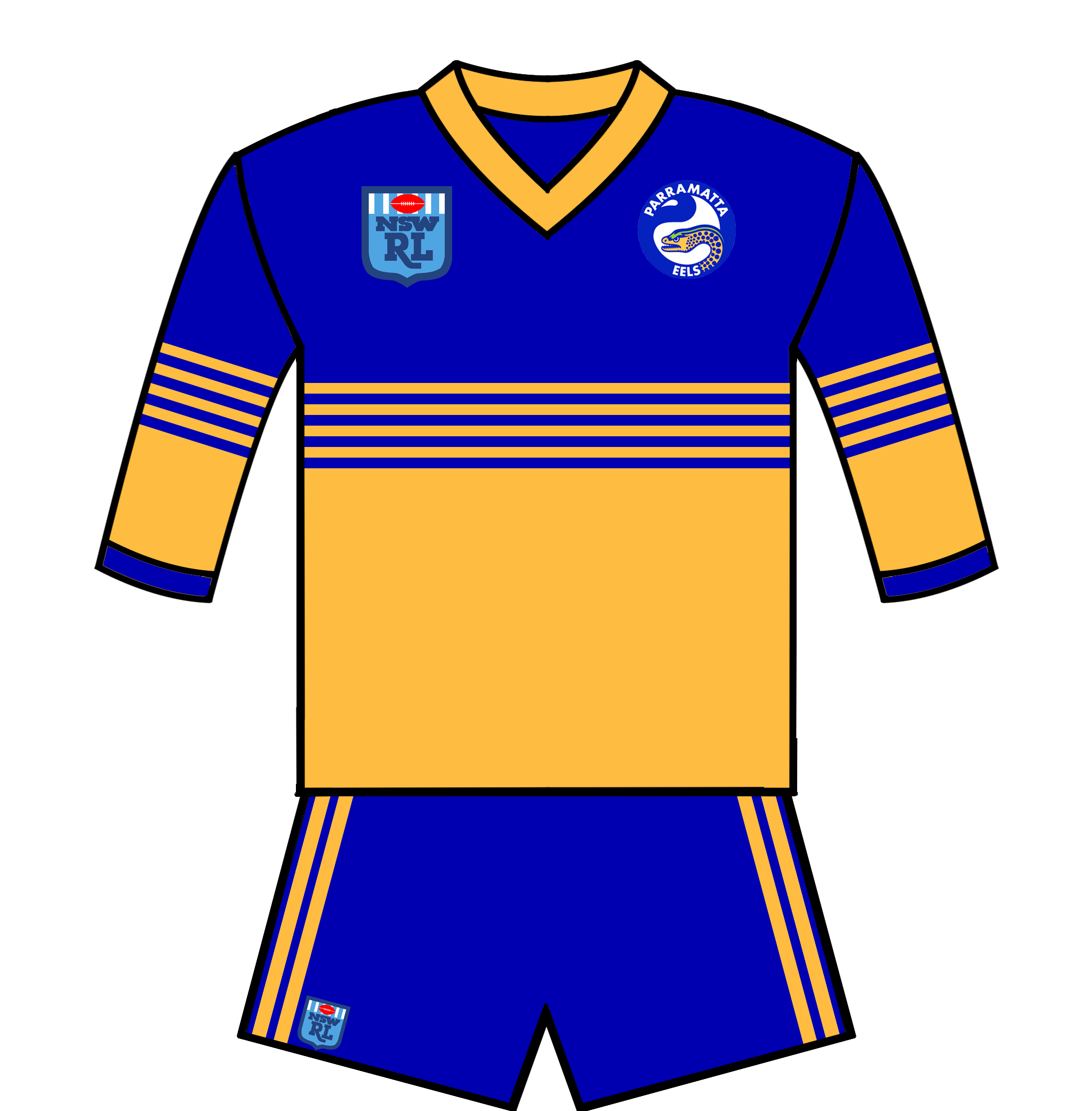
Parramatta; Eels 40th season Ground: Parramatta Stadium; Coach: John Monie; Captain: Ray Price

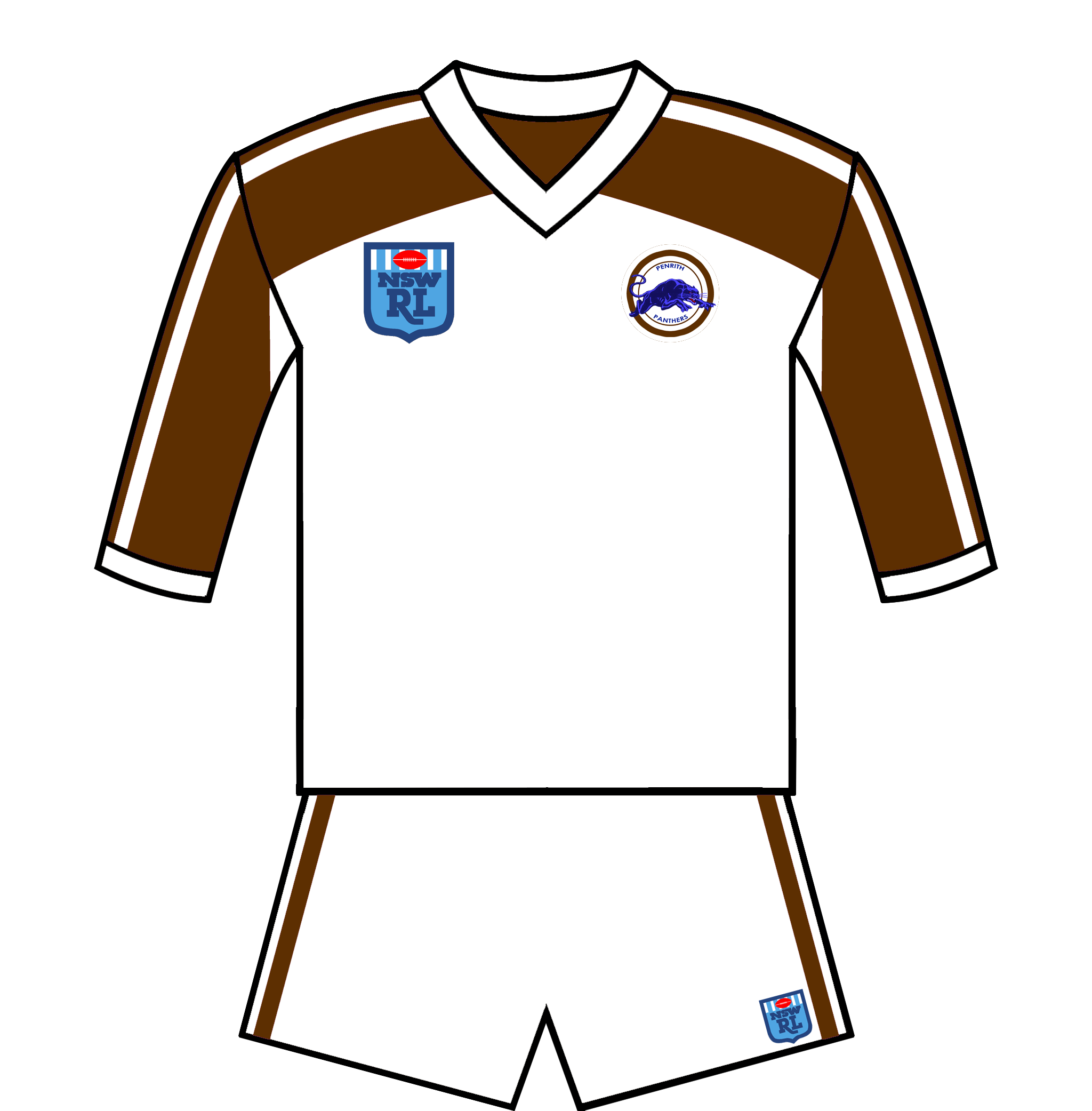
Penrith; Panthers 20th season Ground: Penrith Stadium; Coach: Tim Sheens; Captain: Royce Simmons

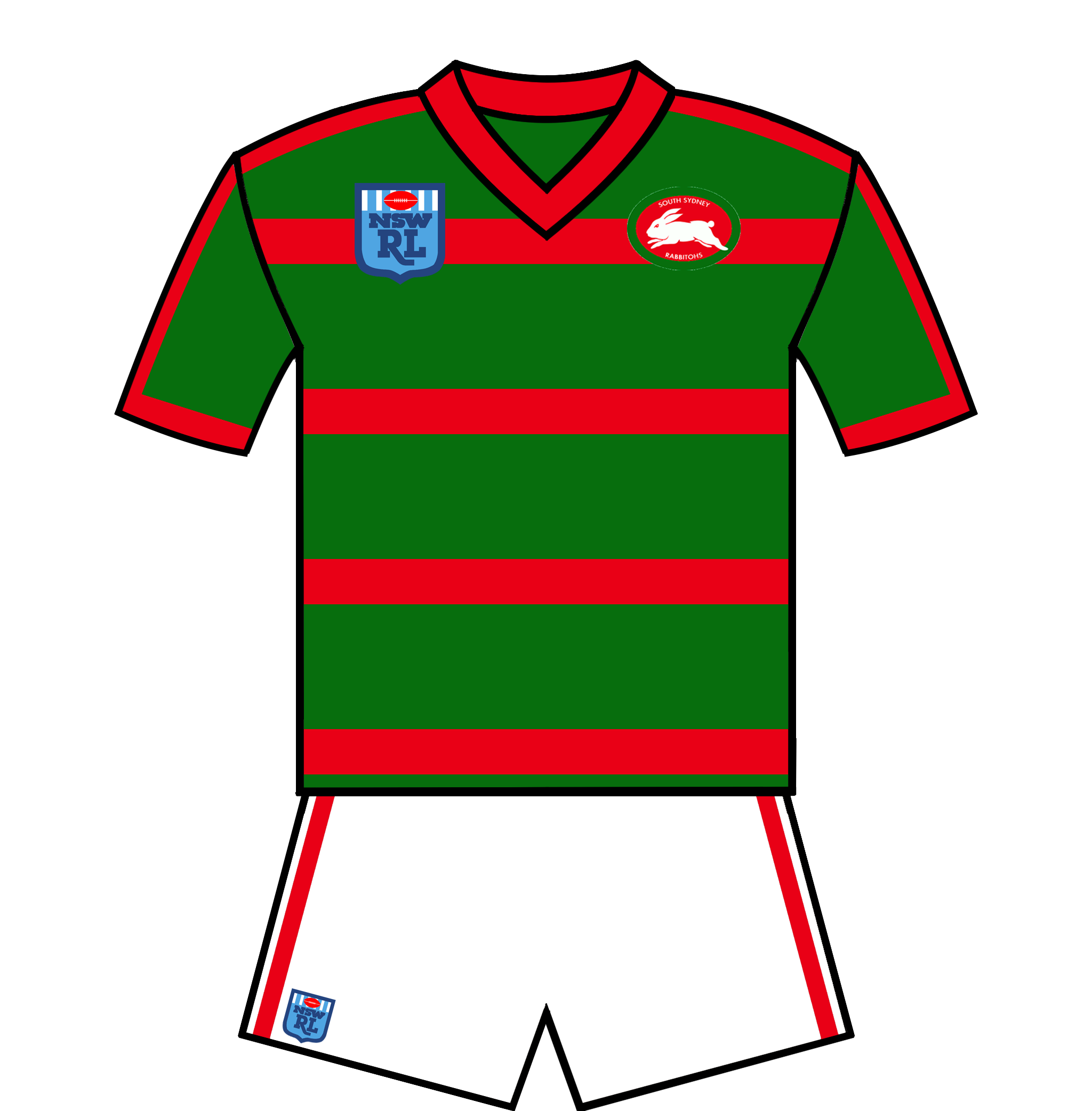
South Sydney; Rabbitohs 79th season Ground: Redfern Oval; Coach: George Piggins; Captain: Mario Fenech

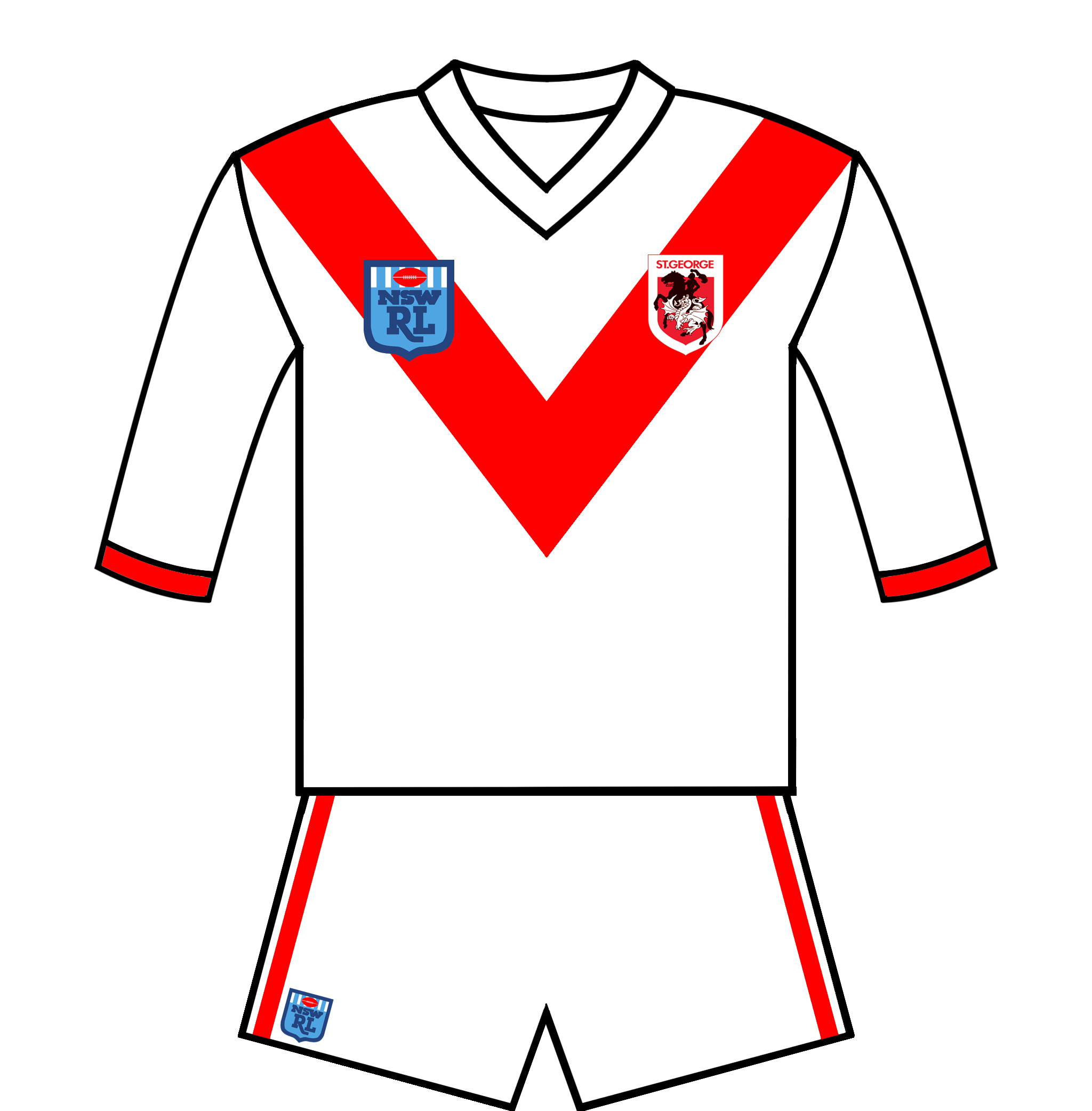
St. George; Dragons 66th season Ground: Sydney Cricket Ground; Coach: Roy Masters; Captain: Craig Young

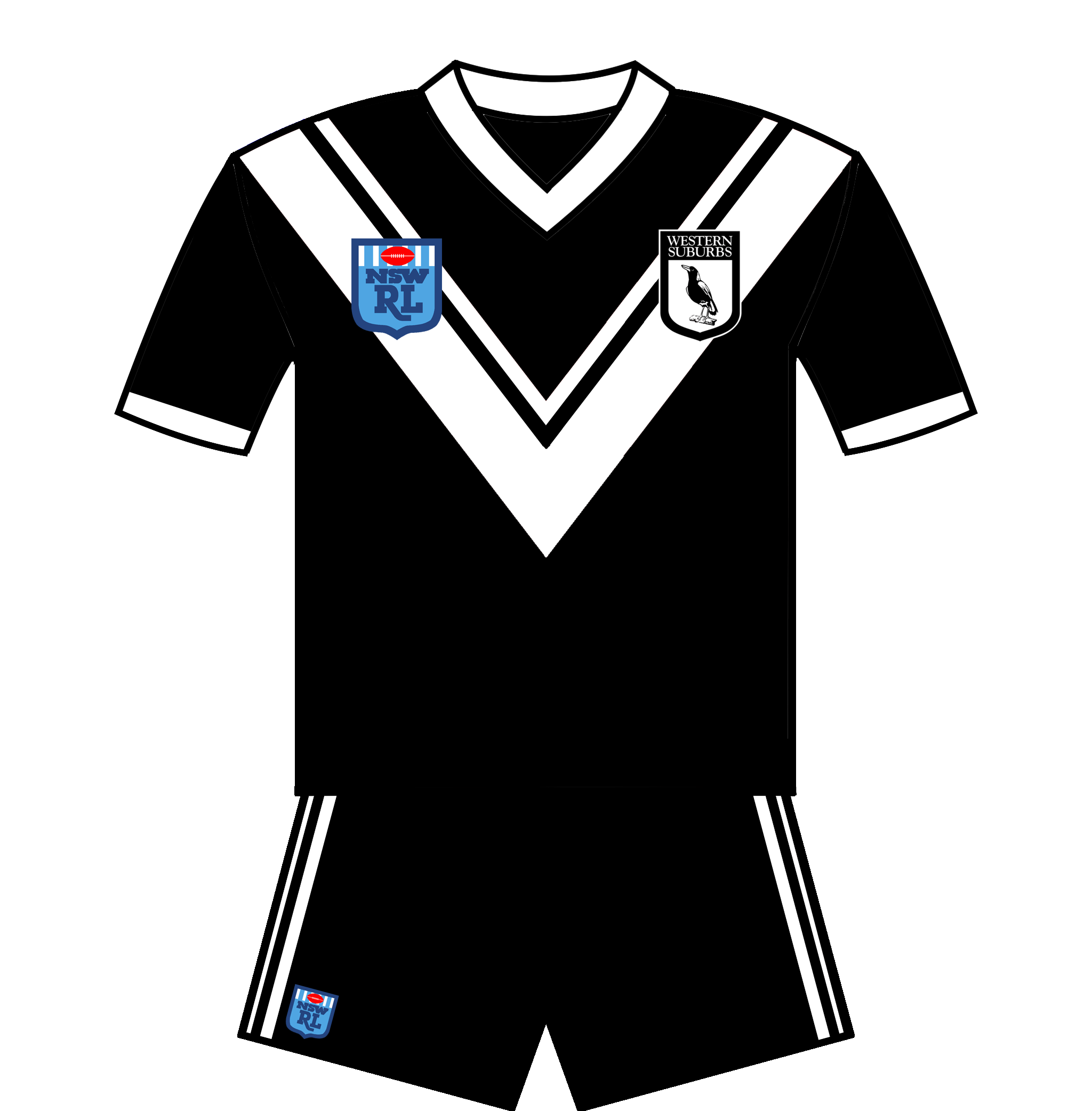
Western Suburbs; Magpies 79th season Ground: Lidcombe Oval; Coach: Steve Ghosn; Captain: Ian Schubert

=== Advertising ===
1986 saw the NSWRL's agency, John Singleton Advertising produce an ad themed around the Gladiators photo and the then premiership trophy. The finished 60sec ad is presented with moving footage and stills from the 1963 grand final showing Provan and Summons embrace and stills shots of other 1970s champions including Bob Fulton, Arthur Beetson and John Sattler interspersed with 1985 season images.

The theme is of past heroes "who played it tough but played it fair" and the ad closes with the question as to who this year will claim the "Greatest Prize of All" - being the Winfield Cup Trophy, featuring the "Gladiators" statue.

== Regular season ==
Team	1	2	3	4	5	6	7	8	9	10	11	12	13	14	15	16	17	18	19	20	21	22	23	24	25	26	F1	F2	F3	F4	GF
Balmain Tigers	**CBY** **+6**	CAN +6	**PAR** **−15**	MAN −2	**STG** **−15**	X	ILA +4	**CRO** **+20**	WES −3	**PEN** **+3**	EAS −10	**NOR** **−9**	SOU +17	**CBY** **+28**	**CAN** **+16**	PAR −28	**MAN** **+5**	STG −6	X	**ILA** **−14**	CRO +2	**WES** **−30**	**PEN** **+17**	**EAS** **+8**	NOR −2	**SOU** **+18**	**NOR** **+7**	MAN +7	SOU +25	CBY −12	
Canberra Raiders	MAN −8	**BAL** **−6**	ILA −12	**CRO** **+14**	WES −10	**PEN** **−6**	EAS −17	**NOR** **+26**	CBY −6	**SOU** **−2**	X	PAR −10	**STG** **+3**	**MAN** **−7**	BAL −16	**ILA** **+14**	CRO −14	**WES** **+32**	PEN +16	**EAS** **+24**	NOR −21	**CBY** **−18**	SOU −5	X	**PAR** **+7**	STG; 0					
Canterbury-Bankstown Bulldogs	BAL −6	**CRO** **+36**	WES; 0	**PEN** **+25**	EAS +7	**NOR** **−15**	X	SOU +24	**CAN** **+6**	PAR +9	**MAN** **−14**	STG +3	**ILA** **+25**	BAL −28	CRO −10	WES +50	PEN +5	**EAS** **+12**	NOR +20	X	**SOU** **−9**	CAN +18	**PAR** **−1**	MAN −8	**STG** **+9**	**ILA** **+6**	X	SOU +14	PAR −22	**BAL** **+12**	PAR −2
Cronulla-Sutherland Sharks	EAS +10	CBY −36	**SOU** **+14**	CAN −14	**PAR** **−22**	MAN −12	**STG** **−2**	BAL −20	**ILA** **+20**	X	WES −17	**PEN** **−24**	NOR −21	**EAS** **−23**	**CBY** **+10**	SOU; 0	**CAN** **+14**	PAR +14	**MAN** **−28**	STG +8	**BAL** **−2**	ILA +6	X	**WES** **+14**	PEN −36	**NOR** **−7**					
Eastern Suburbs Roosters	**CRO** **−10**	**PEN** **+30**	X	NOR −1	**CBY** **−7**	SOU −2	**CAN** **+17**	PAR −32	**MAN** **−6**	STG +5	**BAL** **+10**	ILA −10	WES −2	CRO +23	PEN −20	X	**NOR** **+7**	CBY −12	**SOU** **+18**	CAN −24	PAR −2	MAN +5	STG −13	BAL −8	**ILA** **+2**	WES +2					
Illawarra Steelers	**NOR** **−4**	SOU −3	**CAN** **+12**	PAR −4	**MAN** **−10**	STG +14	**BAL** **−4**	X	CRO −20	**WES** **+26**	PEN −4	**EAS** **+10**	CBY −25	NOR +6	SOU −9	CAN −14	**PAR** **−7**	MAN −2	**STG** **−12**	BAL +14	X	**CRO** **−6**	WES −14	**PEN** **+2**	EAS −2	CBY −6					
Manly Warringah Sea Eagles	**CAN** **+8**	X	**STG** **−1**	**BAL** **+2**	ILA +10	**CRO** **+12**	WES −10	**PEN** **+6**	EAS +6	**NOR** **+4**	CBY +14	**SOU** **−4**	PAR +12	CAN +7	X	STG +32	BAL −5	**ILA** **+2**	CRO +28	**WES** **−2**	PEN; 0	**EAS** **−5**	NOR −6	**CBY** **+8**	SOU −5	**PAR** **−16**	X	**BAL** **−7**			
North Sydney Bears	ILA +4	**WES** **+16**	PEN −28	**EAS** **+1**	X	CBY +15	**SOU** **−18**	CAN −26	**PAR** **−1**	MAN −4	**STG** **−12**	BAL +9	**CRO** **+21**	**ILA** **−6**	WES +2	**PEN** **+4**	EAS −7	X	**CBY** **−20**	SOU −24	**CAN** **+21**	PAR +4	**MAN** **+6**	STG −20	**BAL** **+2**	CRO +7	BAL −7				
Parramatta Eels	X	**STG** **+30**	BAL +15	**ILA** **+4**	CRO +22	**WES** **+30**	PEN −4	**EAS** **+32**	NOR +1	**CBY** **−9**	SOU −7	**CAN** **+10**	**MAN** **−12**	X	STG +13	**BAL** **+28**	ILA +7	**CRO** **−14**	WES +6	**PEN** **+6**	**EAS** **+2**	**NOR** **−4**	CBY +1	**SOU**; **0**	CAN −7	MAN +16	X	X	**CBY** **+22**	X	**CBY** **+2**
Penrith Panthers	WES +8	EAS −30	**NOR** **+28**	CBY −25	**SOU** **−7**	CAN +6	**PAR** **+4**	MAN −6	**STG** **+16**	BAL −3	**ILA** **+4**	CRO +24	X	**WES** **+28**	**EAS** **+20**	NOR −4	**CBY** **−5**	SOU +3	**CAN** **−16**	PAR −6	**MAN**; **0**	STG −4	BAL −17	ILA −2	**CRO** **+36**	X					
South Sydney Rabbitohs	**STG** **+18**	**ILA** **+3**	CRO −14	**WES** **+15**	PEN +7	**EAS** **+2**	NOR +18	**CBY** **−24**	X	CAN +2	**PAR** **+7**	MAN +4	**BAL** **−17**	STG −6	**ILA** **+9**	**CRO**; **0**	**WES** **+7**	**PEN** **−3**	EAS −18	**NOR** **+24**	CBY +9	X	**CAN** **+5**	PAR; 0	**MAN** **+5**	BAL −18	X	**CBY** **−14**	**BAL** **−25**		
St. George Dragons	SOU −18	PAR −30	MAN +1	X	BAL +15	**ILA** **−14**	CRO +2	**WES** **+14**	PEN −16	**EAS** **−5**	NOR +12	**CBY** **−3**	CAN −3	**SOU** **+6**	**PAR** **−13**	**MAN** **−32**	X	**BAL** **+6**	ILA +12	**CRO** **−8**	WES +4	**PEN** **+4**	**EAS** **+13**	**NOR** **+20**	CBY −9	**CAN**; **0**					
Western Suburbs Magpies	**PEN** **−8**	NOR −16	**CBY**; **0**	SOU −15	**CAN** **+10**	PAR −30	**MAN** **+10**	STG −14	**BAL** **+3**	ILA −26	**CRO** **+17**	X	**EAS** **+2**	PEN −28	**NOR** **−2**	**CBY** **−50**	SOU −7	CAN −32	**PAR** **−6**	MAN +2	**STG** **−4**	BAL +30	**ILA** **+14**	CRO −14	X	**EAS** **−2**					
Team	1	2	3	4	5	6	7	8	9	10	11	12	13	14	15	16	17	18	19	20	21	22	23	24	25	26	F1	F2	F3	F4	GF

Bold – Home game
X – Bye
Opponent for round listed above margin

=== Ladder ===
	Team	Pld	W	D	L	B	PF	PA	PD	Pts
1	**Parramatta (P)**	24	16	1	7	2	446	280	+166	37
2	South Sydney	24	15	2	7	2	353	318	+35	36
3	Canterbury	24	15	1	8	2	428	264	+164	35
4	Manly	24	14	1	9	2	476	379	+97	33
5	Balmain	24	13	0	11	2	403	387	+16	30
6	North Sydney	24	13	0	11	2	362	416	-54	30
7	St. George	24	12	1	11	2	360	402	-42	29
8	Penrith	24	11	1	12	2	446	394	+52	27
9	Eastern Suburbs	24	10	0	14	2	334	364	-30	24
10	Cronulla	24	9	1	14	2	310	464	-154	23
11	Canberra	24	8	1	15	2	391	413	-22	21
12	Western Suburbs	24	8	1	15	2	372	538	-166	21
13	Illawarra	24	7	0	17	2	310	372	-62	18

=== Ladder progression ===
- Numbers highlighted in green indicate that the team finished the round inside the top 5.
- Numbers highlighted in blue indicates the team finished first on the ladder in that round.
- Numbers highlighted in red indicates the team finished last place on the ladder in that round.
- Underlined numbers indicate that the team had a bye during that round.

	Team	1	2	3	4	5	6	7	8	9	10	11	12	13	14	15	16	17	18	19	20	21	22	23	24	25	26
1	Parramatta Eels	2	4	6	8	10	12	12	14	16	16	16	18	18	20	22	24	26	26	28	30	32	32	34	35	35	37
2	South Sydney Rabbitohs	2	4	4	6	8	10	12	12	14	16	18	20	20	20	22	23	25	25	25	27	29	31	33	34	36	36
3	Canterbury-Bankstown Bulldogs	0	2	3	5	7	7	9	11	13	15	15	17	19	19	19	21	23	25	27	29	29	31	31	31	33	35
4	Manly Warringah Sea Eagles	2	4	4	6	8	10	10	12	14	16	18	18	20	22	24	26	26	28	30	30	31	31	31	33	33	33
5	Balmain Tigers	2	4	4	4	4	6	8	10	10	12	12	12	14	16	18	18	20	20	22	22	24	24	26	28	28	30
6	North Sydney Bears	2	4	4	6	8	10	10	10	10	10	10	12	14	14	16	18	18	20	20	20	22	24	26	26	28	30
7	St. George Dragons	0	0	2	4	6	6	8	10	10	10	12	12	12	14	14	14	16	18	20	20	22	24	26	28	28	29
8	Penrith Panthers	2	2	4	4	4	6	8	8	10	10	12	14	16	18	20	20	20	22	22	22	23	23	23	23	25	27
9	Eastern Suburbs Roosters	0	2	4	4	4	4	6	6	6	8	10	10	10	12	12	14	16	16	18	18	18	20	20	20	22	24
10	Cronulla-Sutherland Sharks	2	2	4	4	4	4	4	4	6	8	8	8	8	8	10	11	13	15	15	17	17	19	21	23	23	23
11	Canberra Raiders	0	0	0	2	2	2	2	4	4	4	6	6	8	8	8	10	10	12	14	16	16	16	16	18	20	21
12	Western Suburbs Magpies	0	0	1	1	3	3	5	5	7	7	9	11	13	13	13	13	13	13	13	15	15	17	19	19	21	21
13	Illawarra Steelers	0	0	2	2	2	4	4	6	6	8	8	10	10	12	12	12	12	12	12	14	16	16	16	18	18	18

== Finals ==
Home	Score	Away	Match Information
Home	Score	Away	Date and Time	Venue	Referee	Crowd
Playoff
Balmain Tigers	14-7	North Sydney Bears	2 September 1986	Sydney Cricket Ground	Mick Stone	10,788
Qualifying Finals
Manly-Warringah Sea Eagles	22-29	Balmain Tigers	6 September 1986	Sydney Cricket Ground	Kevin Roberts	17,597
South Sydney Rabbitohs	2-16	Canterbury-Bankstown Bulldogs	7 September 1986	Sydney Cricket Ground	Mick Stone	24,573
Semi-finals
South Sydney Rabbitohs	11-36	Balmain Tigers	13 September 1986	Sydney Cricket Ground	Kevin Roberts	27,035
Parramatta Eels	28-6	Canterbury-Bankstown Bulldogs	14 September 1986	Sydney Cricket Ground	Mick Stone	32,499
Preliminary final
Canterbury-Bankstown Bulldogs	28-16	Balmain Tigers	21 September 1986	Sydney Cricket Ground	Mick Stone	32,341
Grand final
Parramatta Eels	4-2	Canterbury-Bankstown Bulldogs	28 September 1986	Sydney Cricket Ground	Mick Stone	45,843

=== Chart ===
Qualifying final
2	South Sydney	2
3	Canterbury	16
4	Manly	22
5	Balmain	29

Major semi-final
1	Parramatta	28
Canterbury	6
Minor semi-final
South Sydney	11
Balmain	36

Preliminary final
Canterbury	28
Balmain	16

Grand final
Parramatta	4
Canterbury	2

=== Grand final ===
Parramatta Eels	Position	Canterbury-Bankstown Bulldogs
1. Paul Taylor	FB	1. Phil Sigsworth
2. Mick Delroy	WG	2. Andrew Farrar
3. Mick Cronin	CE	3. Michael Hagan
4. Steve Ella	CE	4. Chris Mortimer
5. Eric Grothe Sr.	WG	5. Steve O'Brien
6. Brett Kenny	FE	6. Terry Lamb
7. Peter Sterling	HB	7. Steve Mortimer (c)
13. Geoff Bugden	PR	13. Peter Tunks
12. Michael Moseley	HK	12. Mark Bugden
11. Terry Leabeater	PR	11. Peter Kelly
10. Mark Laurie	SR	10. Paul Dunn
9.John Muggleton	SR	9. Steve Folkes
8. Ray Price (c)	LK	8. Paul Langmack
18. Tony Chalmers	Bench	14. Geoff Robinson
52. Peter Wynn	Bench	15. David Boyd
John Monie	Coach	Warren Ryan

Eels coach John Monie had been under pressure since replacing Jack Gibson in 1984, who had coached the club to three consecutive premiership wins from 1981 to 1983. This would also be the farewell season for club stalwarts Ray Price and Mick Cronin, with Eels fans hopeful of a triumphant send-off for the duo. The Eels had made a promising start to the season with a victory in the pre-season competition, and continued their success when they claimed the midweek National Panasonic cup and the minor premiership.

The Bulldogs on the other hand were building a dynasty under the Warren Ryan-coached style of uncompromising defence that had changed the game. In prop Peter Kelly, hooker Mark Bugden and three-quarter Andrew Farrar, Ryan possessed a number of defensive hitmen capable of carrying out his game plan.

Parramatta's Mick Cronin required a police escort to the match after being stuck in a traffic jam.

The grand final was fifteen minutes old when Eels winger Mick Delroy was knocked out by a high shot from Farrar while Price suffered a constant barrage from Kelly throughout the first half. Referee Mick Stone at least initially appeared reluctant to send anyone off and Farrar and Kelly benefitted.

Stone also disallowed two near tries in the first half to Eels five-eighth Brett Kenny who was ultimately frustrated in his attempt to replicate the two tries per grand final statistic that he'd maintained in each of the 1981, 1982 and 1983 deciders.

It wasn't until Kelly was sin-binned for 10 minutes for a high tackle on Price that the Eels started to find gaps in the Bulldogs line. Two minutes before half time and still with 12 men Canterbury looked in trouble when Eric Grothe Sr. set off down the sideline with a clear path. A desperate Steve Mortimer cover-defending run brought Grothe down metres from the tryline. A minute later Cronin opened the scoring for the Eels with a successful penalty goal.

Twelve minutes into the second half, Canterbury five-eighth Terry Lamb levelled the score with a penalty goal after Peter Sterling was penalised for a late tackle on Steve Mortimer.

With eighteen minutes remaining, Canterbury replacement forward David Boyd was penalised for a high tackle on Price who had by now suffered an hour of ferocious Bulldog attention. Price appeared concussed and the Parramatta trainers unsuccessfully tried to convince him to leave the field. Cronin kicked the resultant penalty and the Eels again took a 2-point lead.

After Canterbury fullback Phil Sigsworth was sent off for a high shot on Kenny, the 12 remaining Bulldogs lifted a level and continued with attacking surges. Farrar was stopped by the Eels defence centimetres from the line, Lamb missed an opportunity to level with another penalty attempt and then right on the bell Parramatta forward Michael Moseley, in a career highlight moment, cut down Bugden as the Bulldogs hooker appeared certain to score.

Parramatta had taken on Canterbury at their own game - defence-focused trench warfare and managed to keep the game tryless and win the battle of attrition. In the process they halted Canterbury's hopes of three successive titles in the first try-less grand final.

Parramatta 4
Goals: Cronin 2

Canterbury-Bankstown 2
Goals: Lamb 1

Clive Churchill Medal: Peter Sterling (Parramatta)

== Player statistics ==
The following statistics are as of the conclusion of Round 26.

Top 5 point scorers

Points	Player	Tries	Goals	Field goals
184	Terry Lamb	11	66	8
183	Greg Alexander	11	69	1
172	Mal Cochrane	4	78	0
165	Neil Baker	5	63	19
164	Ross Conlon	4	74	0

Top 5 try scorers

Tries	Player
13	Phil Blake
12	Terry Fahey
12	Rod Pethybridge
11	Terry Lamb
11	Steve O'Brien
11	Greg Alexander
11	Gary Wurth
11	Gary Belcher
11	Alan McIndoe

Top 5 goal scorers

Goals	Player
78	Mal Cochrane
74	Ross Conlon
69	Greg Alexander
66	Terry Lamb
65	Mal Meninga
