= Michael Moseley =

Michael Moseley may refer to:

- T. Michael Moseley (born 1949), retired United States Air Force four-star general
- Michael E. Moseley, American anthropologist at the University of Florida
- Michael Moseley (rugby league) (born 1960), Australian rugby league footballer

== See also ==
- Michael Mosley (disambiguation)
