= Haslar =

Human settlement in Hampshire, England

Coordinates: 50.78°N 1.13°W

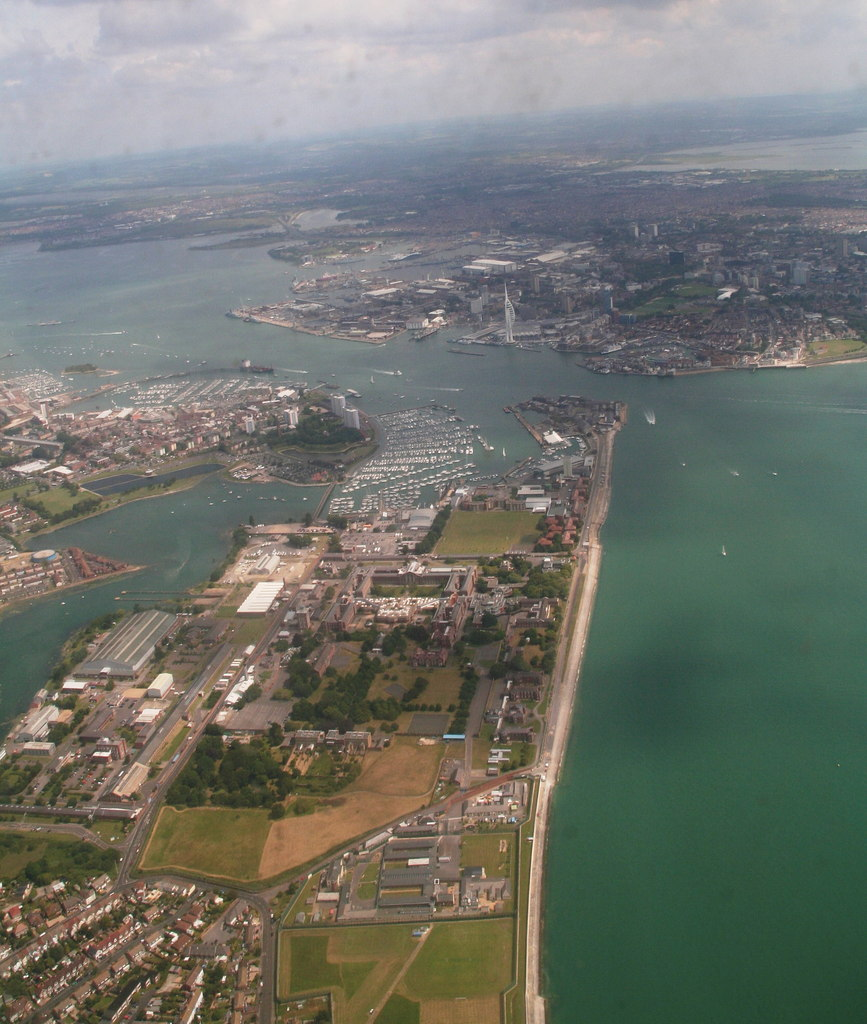
- Aerial view of Haslar peninsula showing former naval and military installations: Royal Hospital quadrangle in the centre, HMS Hornet and Fort Blockhouse beyond; gunboat yard to the left of the hospital and Admiralty Experiment Works below it; Immigration Removal Centre (ex-Haslar Barracks) bottom right.

- Location within Hampshire
- District: Gosport
- Shire county: Hampshire
- Region: South East
- Country: England
- Sovereign state: United Kingdom
- Post town: GOSPORT
- Postcode district: PO12
- Dialling code: 023
- Police: Hampshire and Isle of Wight
- Fire: Hampshire and Isle of Wight
- Ambulance: South Central
- UK Parliament: Gosport

Haslar is on the south coast of England, at the southern tip of Alverstoke, on the Gosport peninsula, Hampshire. It takes its name from the Old English hæsel-ōra, meaning "hazel-landing place". It may have been named after a bank of hazel strewn on marshy grounds around Haslar Creek to make it passable and habitable in old times, or merely because hazel grew there.

== Royal Hospital Haslar ==
The location consists principally of the former Royal Hospital Haslar site, now luxury housing. The site for Haslar hospital was bought in 1745; before that the land was Haslar Farm (though spelt Hasler Farm at the time) within the liberty of Alverstoke. The site was a slightly unusual location for a hospital because it was surrounded by the Gosport Creek, with no readily available access: such an area was chosen to prevent press-ganged sailors from absconding.

== Royal Naval Cemetery ==
It was primarily to serve the hospital that the Haslar Royal Naval Cemetery was laid out. It contains (June 2014) Commonwealth war graves of 772 naval personnel of World War I (two of whom are unidentified), and 611 of World War II (36 unidentified), besides ten foreign sailors, and nine non-World War service burials. There is a mass grave of 42 officers and men of the submarine HMS L55, recovered from the Baltic Sea and repatriated in 1928, their names on a screen wall memorial. Singer Chick Henderson, killed in a German flying bomb attack in Southsea, Hampshire in 1944, is buried here under rank and real name of Sub-Lieutenant Henderson Rowntree. Also now buried here are 26 Turkish sailors of two ships of the Ottoman Navy, Mirat-ı Zafer and Sirag-i Bahri Birik, anchored off the Hardway near Gosport in 1850–51, during which time some of the members of the crew contracted cholera and were admitted to Haslar Hospital for treatment, where most of them died. In addition, some other sailors died because of training accidents. They were buried in the grounds of Haslar but at the turn of the 20th century the bodies were exhumed and transferred to the Royal Naval Cemetery here.

== Haslar Barracks ==
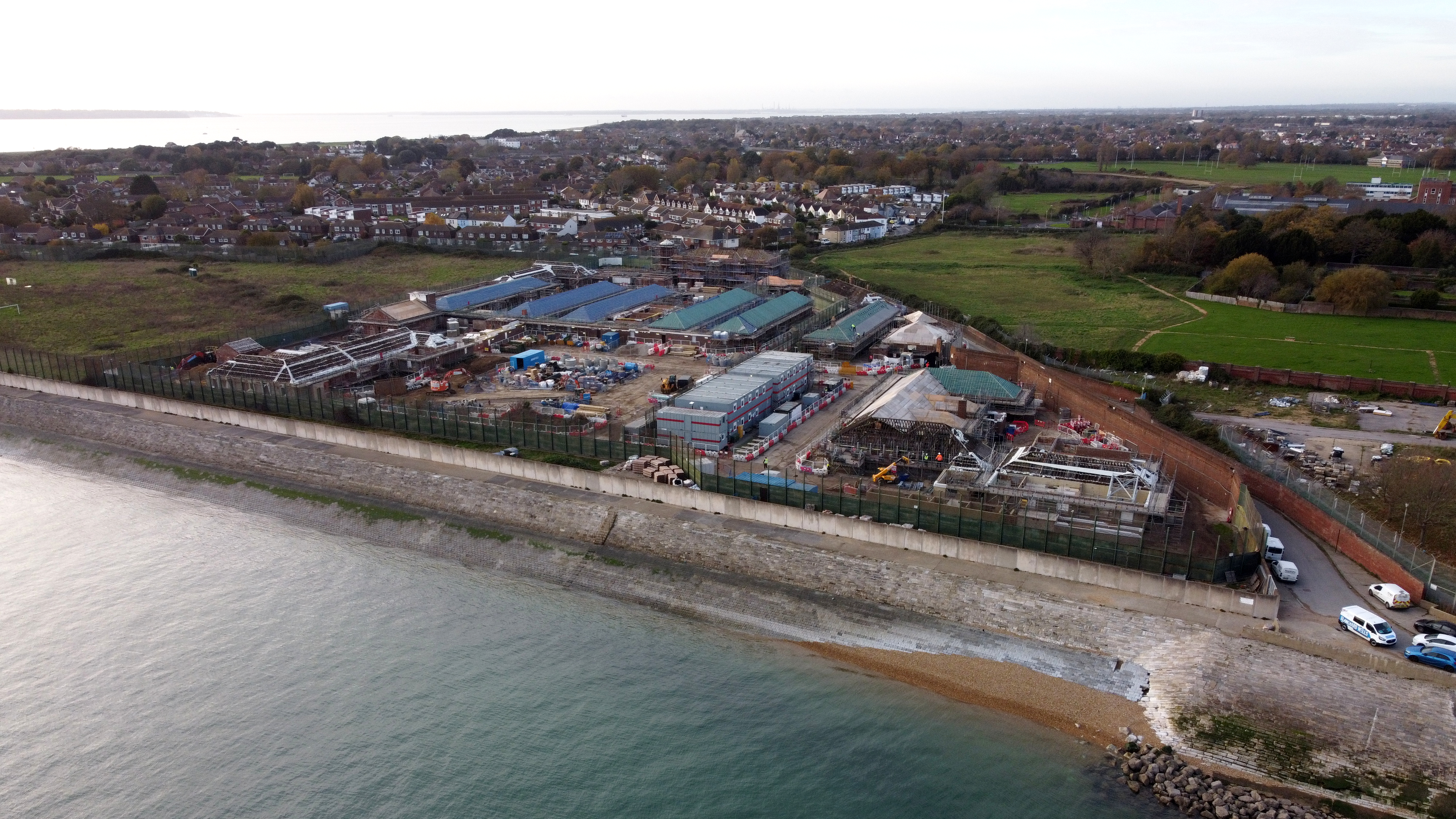
The former Haslar Barracks in 2024.

In 1802 an infantry barracks was built on a triangular site, on the promontory south of the hospital, which was known as Camp Field (having served as an Army encampment in the latter part of the 18th century). In 1864, as part of the army's medical reforms following the Crimean War, Haslar Barracks was converted to serve as a garrison hospital (the New Barracks having by then opened in nearby Gosport); it became known as Haslar Military Hospital. Thirty years later, the site reverted to barrack use: from 1892 until 1939 it was occupied by the Royal Engineers, during the Second World War an Anti-aircraft Brigade occupied the site, then the Royal Army Ordnance Corps did so in the early 1950s. Thereafter, the site was handed over to the Home Office and became a prison, serving latterly as Haslar Immigration Removal Centre. The Centre closed down in 2017. Through all the various uses of the site, the original buildings had remained in use and their layout intact; in 2017 it was designated a Conservation Area by Gosport Borough Council. In 2022 it was announced that Haslar Immigration Removal Centre would reopen, and in 2024 work was underway to enable this to take place.

== Haslar Gunboat Yard and the Admiralty Experiment Works ==
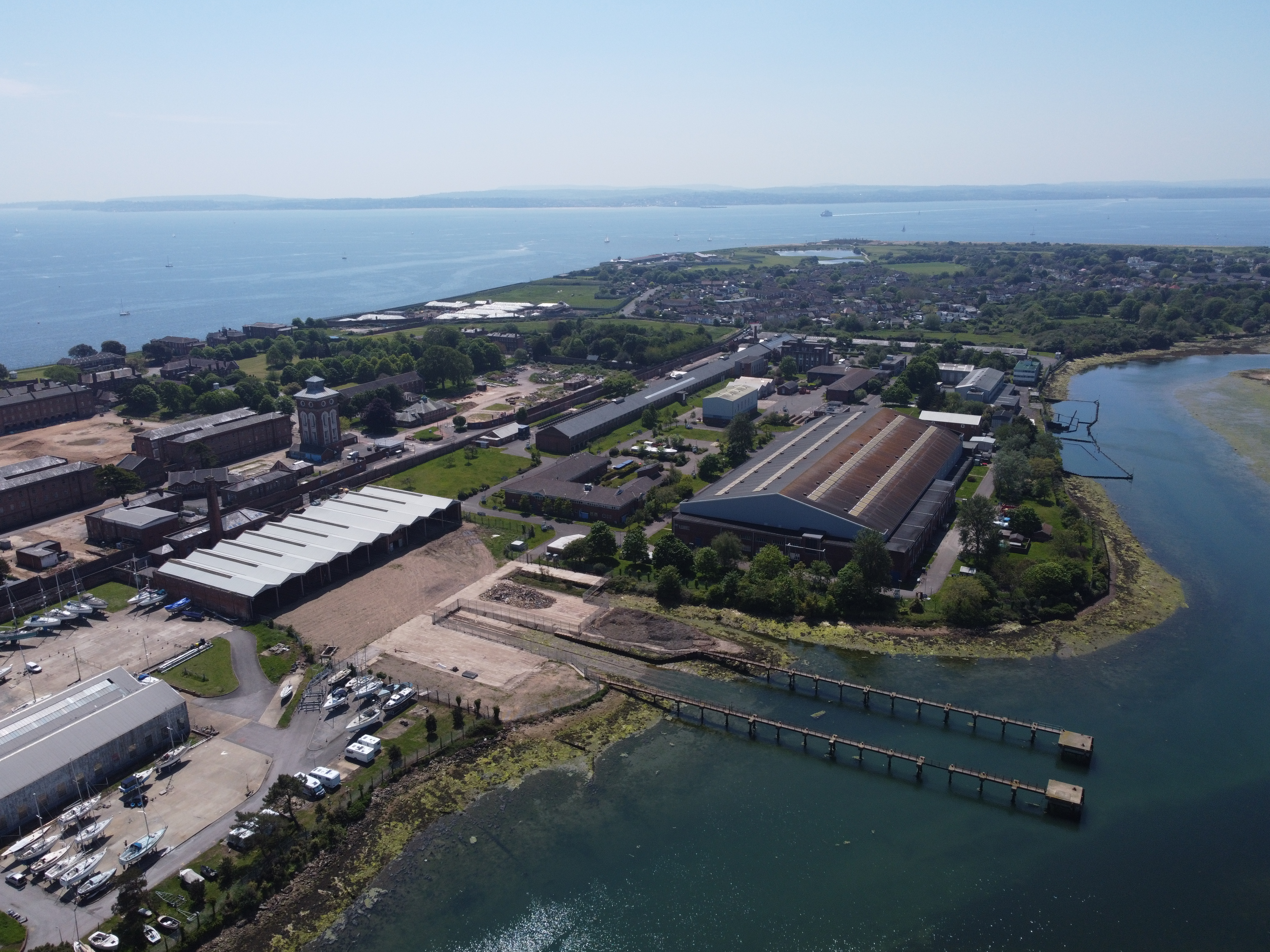
Surviving boat sheds and patent slip of Haslar Gunboat Yard, beyond which are the covered testing tanks and other buildings of the former Admiralty Experiment Works.

The strip of land between the hospital and the creek is occupied by the former Haslar Gunboat Yard, opened in 1856 to house the Royal Navy's coastal gunboats. A single patent slip was used to launch the boats into Haslar Creek, and to haul them out again on a cradle which ran on railway tracks; a locomotive-driven traverser then delivered the boat (still in its cradle) to its place in the row of cast iron boat sheds (ten of which still stand, parallel to the creek - at one time there were fifty in total). A small stationary steam engine mounted on the traverser platform drove an endless screw, which was then used to slide the boat back into its shed.

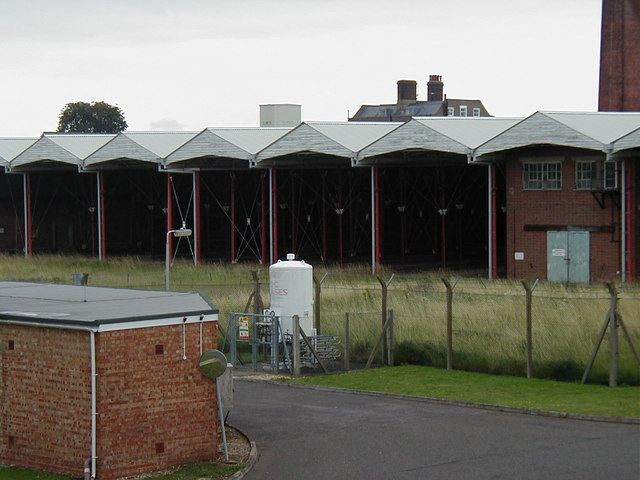
Gunboat sheds in the former Gunboat Yard; by the 1860s there were fifty such sheds on the site, all accessible from the patent slip via the traverser system.

After a series of expansions and contractions, as gunboats went in and out of vogue in naval circles, the Yard closed in 1906; but from 1912 to 1973 the site continued to provide storage and maintenance facilities for small vessels of various types. During the Second World War it formed part of HMS Hornet, the adjacent Coastal Forces base; and when Hornet was decommissioned (in 1957) the Yard became an adjunct of the Admiralty Small Craft Experimental Works (see below).

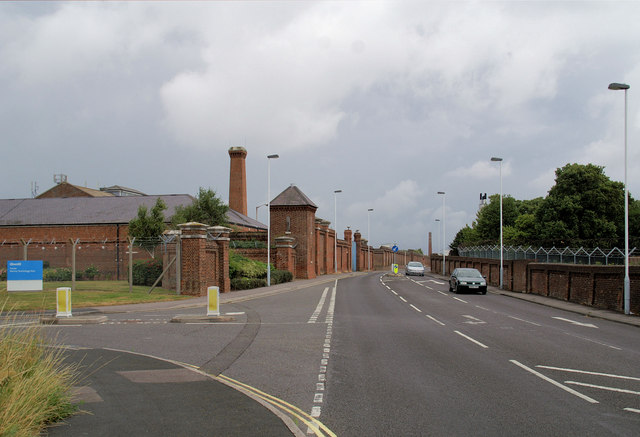
Haslar Road: on the left is the Admiralty Experimental Works, on the right is Haslar Hospital; the chimney of the Gunboat Yard can be seen in the distance.

Haslar closed for good as a Boat Yard after the construction of a new Haslar Bridge, which prevented craft from sailing up the creek. The site is currently unused, but substantially intact; as well as the boat sheds, it contains a pair of guard houses flanking the gateway, several workshops and the former boiler house with its prominent chimney. (Steam from the boilers not only drove the winch, which hauled the boats up the slipway, but also powered the hospital laundry on the other side of the road.) The buildings are all of red brick, as is the surrounding perimeter wall, built with integrated watch towers to provide extra security.

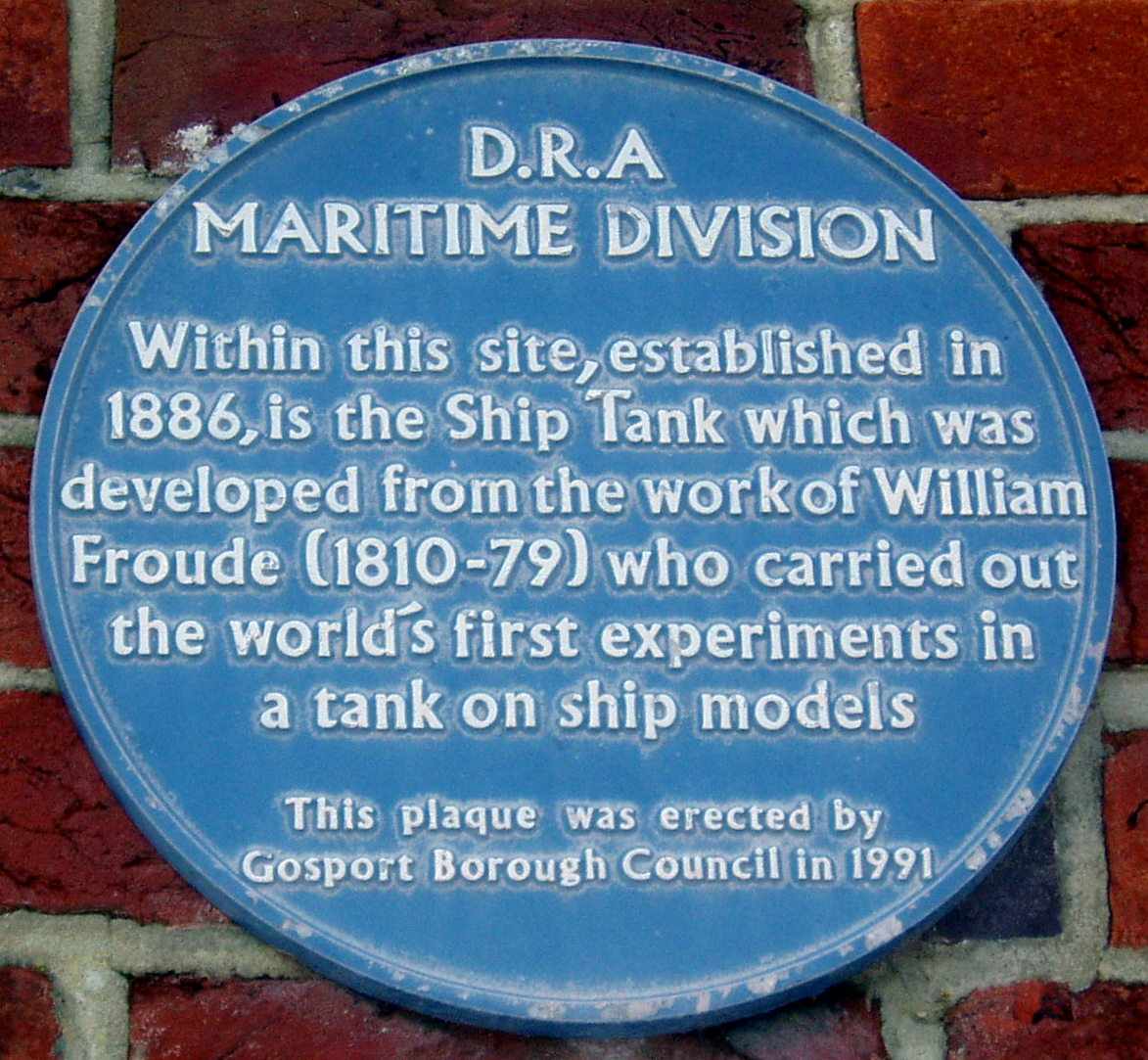
Blue Plaque on the Admiralty Experimental Works

Alongside the Gunboat Yard, within the same compound, stands the Admiralty Experiment Works (later part of the Defence Research Agency and now owned by QinetiQ). It contains a 540 ft concrete water tank, built in 1884 to test different hull designs using wax models, and still in use today. The tank was built for the Admiralty by Robert Edmund Froude in order to carry on the pioneering work of his father, William Froude, who had died in 1879. Over time, as the Gunboat Yard was reduced in size, the Experiment Works expanded to fill the available space.

== Golf course ==
In the late 19th century, a 9-hole golf course was built on the Southern tip of Haslar peninsular, and used by local military as a means of exercise. The United Services Club was established in 1885. In 1905, the club merged with the adjacent ladies of Alverstoke, who had founded their own 9-hole course in 1893, but they did not share a clubhouse until 1924. The club adopted the name of Gosport and Stokes Bay Golf Club in 1939 as an acknowledgement that it was no longer a service and ex-service personnel only club.

It is claimed that in 1892, secretary of Great Yarmouth Club, Dr Thomas Browne, visited the United Services Club and introduced the members to the term "the bogey man", an invisible opponent invented by Hugh Rotherham of Coventry. The members, being all officers, duly promoted the bogey man to the rank of colonel.

== Other features ==
Also here is Haslar Marina, which, along with Weymouth, East Cowes and Portland, is part of the Dean and Reddyhoff marina group. A large green lightship Mary Mouse II is permanently moored on the outside of the marina, by the harbour entrance. The Royal Navy Submarine Museum is found nearby. Haslar Immigration Removal Centre (formerly Haslar Prison) stands to the south-west of the former Hospital site.
