= Michael Mosley (disambiguation) =

Michael Mosley (1957–2024) was a British journalist and TV presenter.

Michael Mosley may also refer to:

- Michael Mosley (actor) (born 1978), American television and film actor
- Mike Mosley (1946–1984), American racecar driver
- Mike Mosley (American football) (born 1958), former American football wide receiver

== See also ==
- Michael Moseley (disambiguation)
