= Delroy Edwards (refugee) =

Jamaican murder victim (1959–2005)

Delroy Edwards (1959 – 12 November 2005) was a Jamaican refugee who, after being refused political asylum in the United Kingdom, was killed by Yardie gang members a few days after his deportation to Jamaica. The refusal to grant him asylum and the later deportation were publicly criticised, and called into question some of the immigration policies of the Home Office and the Immigration Adjudicator.

A longtime resident of Kingston, Edwards was frequently harassed during the 1990s after refusing to participate in criminal activities of a Yardie street gang affiliated with the People's National Party (PNP), with several attempts on his life, including an arson attack which killed two of his daughters, and serious gunshot wounds in 1995 and 1998. In 2001, he fled to Great Britain and formally applied for political asylum. While residing in London, he became engaged to Jane Lowe and had a daughter, Taneika, with her before his deportation. Although Lowe attempted to provide adequate legal representation for Edwards, his frequent transfer between three immigration centres and delayed responses from immigration officials made a solicitor's attempt to appeal his deportation difficult.

Despite his claims of persecution (including an incident in which he been warned by an unidentified individual that he would be killed if he returned to Jamaica) and as showing the wounds in his shoulders and hands, he was declared an economic migrant by the Home Office and put on a flight to Jamaica after being held for eight days at Campsfield House in Oxfordshire, Harmondsworth Immigration Removal Centre near Heathrow and Haslar Immigration Removal Centre near Gosport. He reportedly went into hiding upon his arrival in Kingston, but was killed on the doorstep of an East Kingston house he had been staying at, nine days after his return.
