= Eaton Green =

Eaton Leonard 'Leon' Green (born 21 September 1967) was a Yardie gang member involved in armed robbery, drug dealing and extortion in South London. The first Yardie to become a police informant for the Metropolitan Police, his later testimony during his 1997 deportation hearing would reveal police protection for his criminal activities by immigration and intelligence officers of the Drug Related Violence and Intelligence Unit. DRVI provided false passports to allow Green’s accomplices Cecil and Rohan Thomas (known to have killed at least ten people) and members of the Black Roses crew into the country, as well as helping Green to secure residency rights through his marriage to a British woman under questionable circumstances.

== Biography ==
Having fled Jamaica on murder charges, Green emigrated to the United Kingdom and eventually settled in Brixton in February 1991, where he began dealing crack and cocaine. Within three months, he had been arrested on drugs and weapons charges and soon after recruited by immigration officer Steve Barker as an informant. His arrest on 8 July 1993, for one of the largest armed robberies in UK history at a Nottingham blues party the previous month, caused scandal for the Home Office as Green had been a paid informant at the time of his arrest. Barker allegedly attempted to protect Green from prosecution by Nottingham authorities. In September 1995, he pleaded guilty and was convicted of armed robbery, possession of firearms and unlawful wounding by the Leeds Crown Court. He had shot one of the male guests in the foot during the robbery, allegedly to allay suspicions that he was an informer, but his sentence was reduced due to cooperating with the prosecution in a previous trial.

After serving six years in prison, efforts to avoid deportation by his charge that he had been told by Metropolitan intelligence officers that he would be under the protection of the DRVIU failed and was eventually deported following his deportation trial on 10 July 1997.

Following his release from prison, he applied for asylum on the basis that he would be killed as an informant if returned to Jamaica, which apparently was denied and he was reportedly repatriated to Jamaica in 1999.

== See also ==
- Delroy Denton
