= Terry Leabeater =

Australian rugby league footballer

Personal information
- Born: 16 June 1958 (age 67); Sydney, New South Wales, Australia

Playing information
- Position: Prop
Club
Years	Team	Pld	T	G	FG	P
1979–82	Western Suburbs	42	2	0	0	8
1983–84	Canterbury	4	0	0	0	0
1985	Western Suburbs	21	0	0	0	0
1986–88	Parramatta Eels	48	0	0	0	0
	Total	115	2	0	0	8

Terry Leabeater is an Australian former rugby league footballer who played as a prop for Western Suburbs, Canterbury-Bankstown and the Parramatta Eels in the 1970s and 1980s.

== Playing career ==
Leabeater made his first grade debut for Western Suburbs against St. George in Round 18 1979 at Lidcombe Oval.

Leabeater's first spell at Wests ended in 1982 after the club lost in the finals series against Eastern Suburbs.

Leabeater then signed with Canterbury-Bankstown but only made 4 first grade appearances for the club and then returned to Western Suburbs in 1985 who finished second last. In 1986, Leabeater signed with Parramatta. He was a member of Parramatta's 1986 premiership winning team which defeated Canterbury 4-2 at the Sydney Cricket Ground. As of the 2020 season, this is the club's last premiership victory.

Leabeater's last game in the top grade came against his old club Wests in Round 22 1988 which Parramatta won 16-12 at Parramatta Stadium.

== Post playing ==
In 2014, Leabeater's leagues club membership was canceled by Parramatta for five years and an AVO was filed against him by former teammate Steve Sharp and deputy Parramatta chairman Tony Issa. Leabeater is alleged to have threatened the pair numerous times in relation to boardroom elections at the club.
