= Haslar Immigration Removal Centre =

Immigration detention centre in Hampshire, England

Coordinates: 50.7816°N 1.1283°W

IRC Haslar
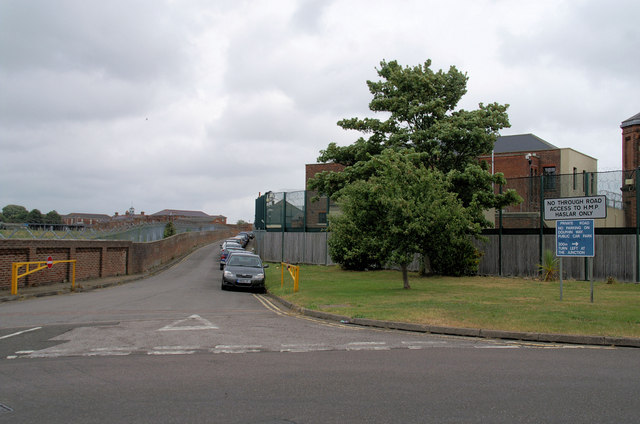
- Interactive map of IRC Haslar
- Location: Haslar, Hampshire
- Security class: Immigration Removal Centre
- Opened: before 1989
- Closed: 2015
- Managed by: HM Prison Services
- Governor: Mr Paul Wiltshire
- Website: Haslar Immigration Removal Centre (archived)

Haslar Immigration Removal Centre (formerly known as Haslar Prison) was an immigration detention centre, located in Haslar (near Gosport), Hampshire, England. The centre was operated by Her Majesty's Prison Service. The centre closed in 2016 with the Ministry of Justice planning to retain the site for use as a prison – plans which were later scrapped. In September 2022, the Guardian reported that Haslar immigration removal centre would reopen in late 2023.

== History ==
The establishment was previously known as HM Detention Centre Haslar (from 1962 to 1989) housing young male offenders. However, from 1989 Haslar started exclusively holding foreign national prisoners.

In February 2002, Haslar was redesignated as a Removal Centre and began operating under Detention Centre rules. Haslar held those detained by UK Visas and Immigration during documentation procedures and during the process of removal or deportation. Only detainees awaiting deportation or appealing against their immigration status were held at Haslar. The vast majority of the population were ex-foreign national prisoners who had either completed their sentence or had their sentence "cut short" to speed up the deportation process.

The detention centre closed in June 2015, and all remaining detainees were moved elsewhere. On 3 November 2016, the Ministry of Justice announced that the centre would not be reopening.

However, in June 2022 the government announced the reopening of Campsfield House immigration removal centre in Kidlington, Oxfordshire, and news emerged in September 2022 that Haslar immigration removal centre would reopen in late 2023.

On 28 October 2022, 22 MPs from the Liberal Democrats, Scottish National Party, Plaid Cymru, Labour Party, Green Party and an independent MP tabled a motion to protest the reopening of these two sites, which would increase the detention estate by 33% at a cost of £339 million. They expressed concern that this reversed the government's previous commitment to reducing the size and use of the immigration detention estate, made following Stephen Shaw's independent review of immigration detention in 2016 commissioned by the Home Office.
