= St George Barracks, Gosport =

St George Barracks
- Gosport
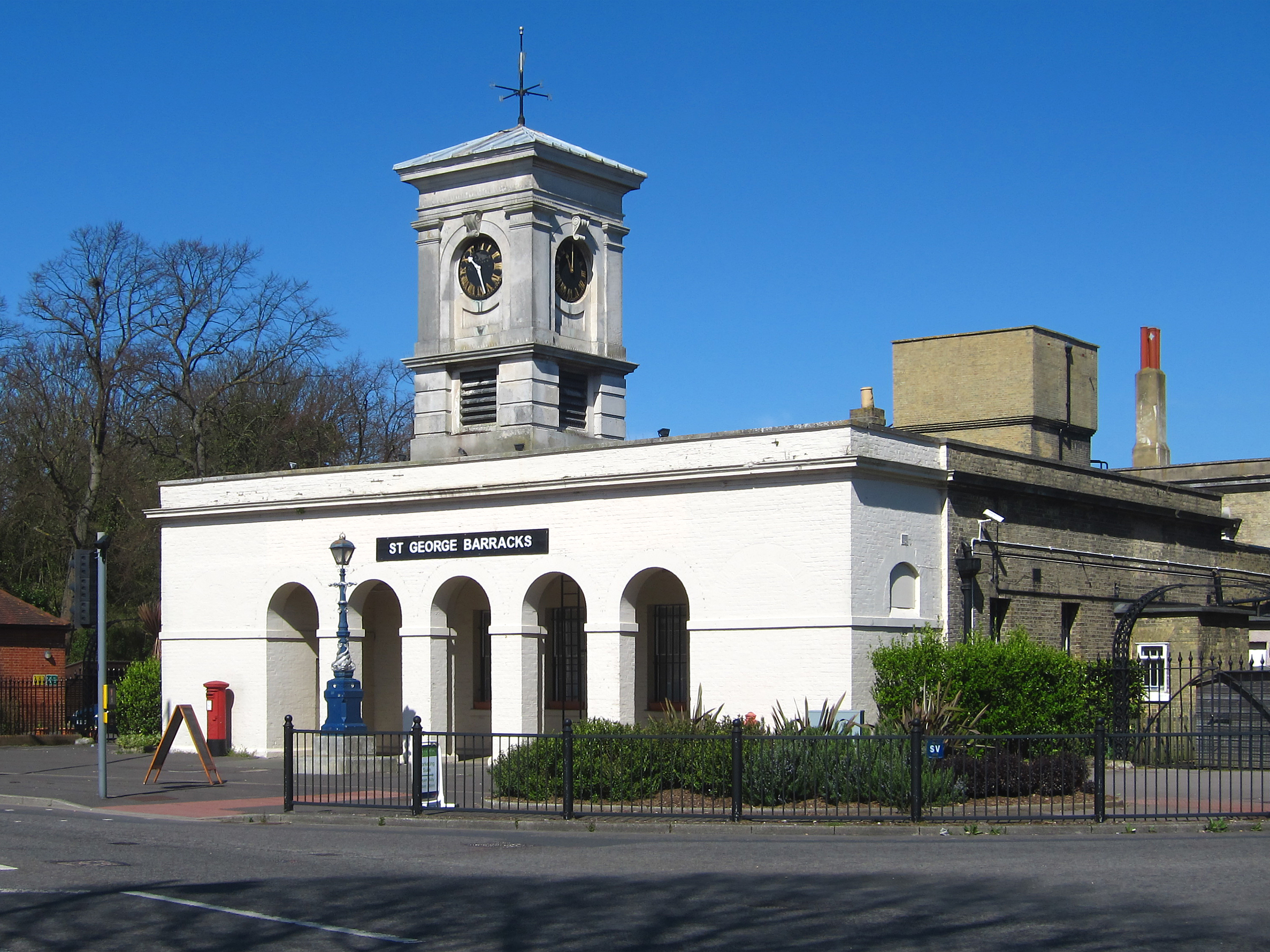
- Gatehouse at St George Barracks

Site information
- Type: Barracks

Location
- Location within Hampshire
- Coordinates: 50.79835°N 1.12659°W

Site history
- Built: 1856–1859
- Built for: War Office
- In use: 1859-1991

St George Barracks (not St George's Barracks) was a military installation at Gosport, Hampshire. In addition to the guard house, barrack blocks, the sergeant's mess and the gymnasium all survive and are Grade II listed buildings.

== History ==
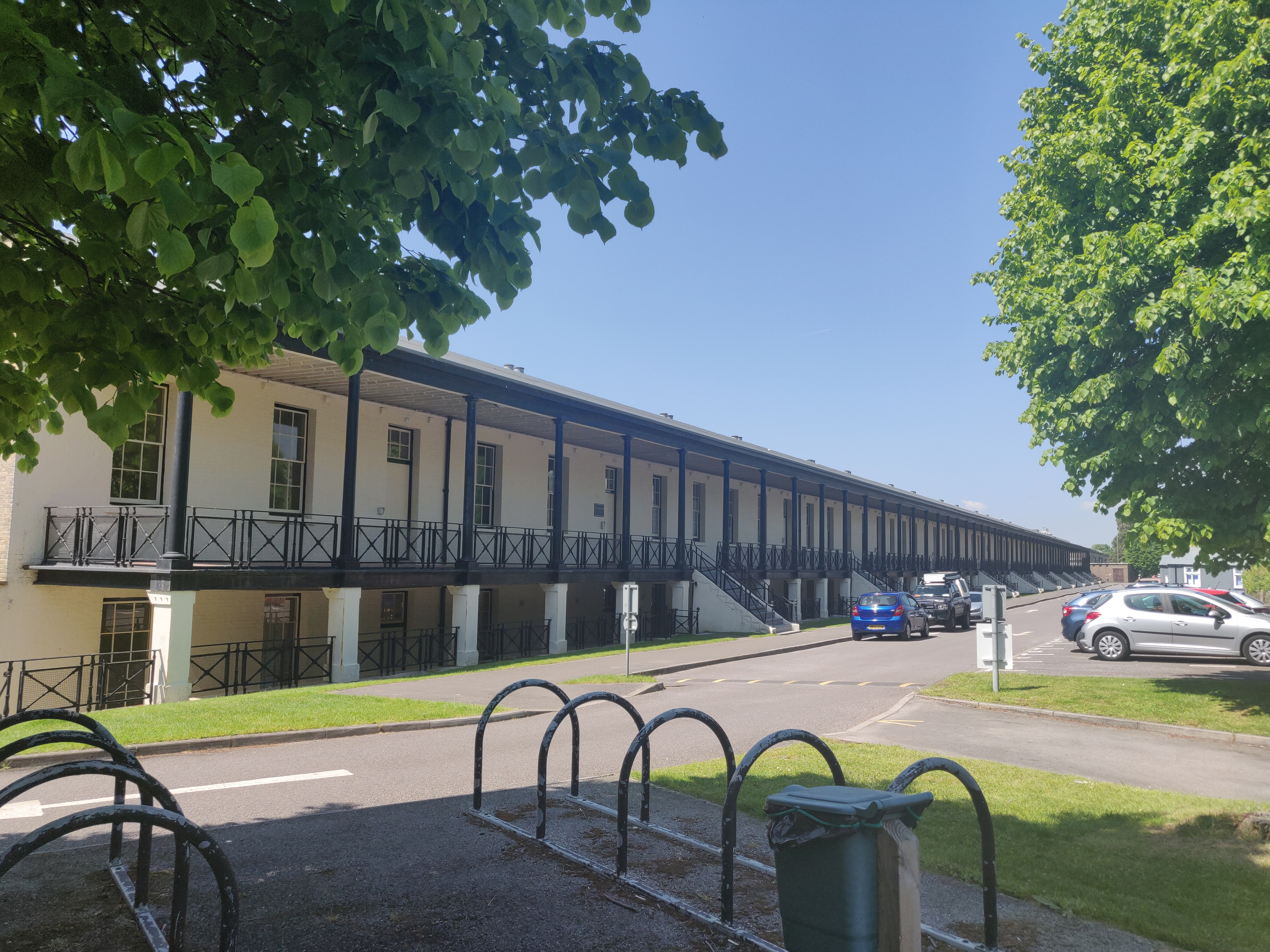
The soldiers' barracks of 1856-1859: a long, 70-bay range with full-length verandah.

The barracks were designed to accommodate an infantry regiment in transit for operations overseas and were built between 1856 and 1859. Initially named "New Barracks", the barracks were built in the colonial style with flat roofs and verandas (intended for wet-weather exercising). The barrack blocks were built along a narrow stretch of land close to (and following the alignment of) the line of fortification known as Gosport Lines (which lie just to the west). Standing so close to the defensive ramparts, the buildings were designed to have a low profile (each consisting of a single storey and a semi-basement). The blocks provided accommodation for thirty-seven officers and over a thousand men.

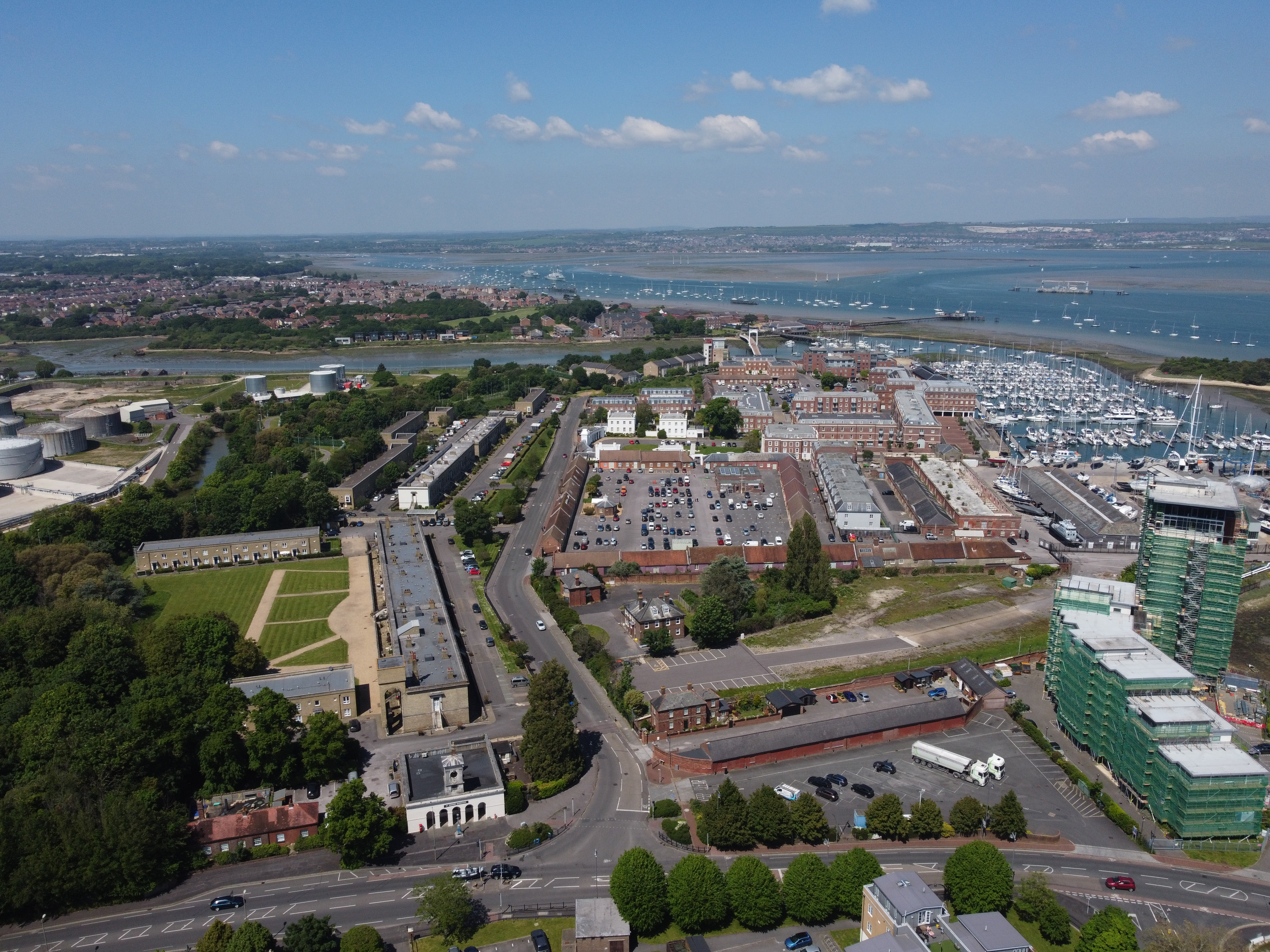
Viewed from the south: the northern section of the barracks (centre-left), with Gosport Lines visible to the left and the Royal Clarence Victualling Yard to the right.

The site was first occupied by the 86th (Royal County Down) Regiment of Foot in August 1859. A gymnasium was added in 1868, and a small iron church some time after 1891. There were also skittle alleys for recreation and stables for six horses.

During the Second World War the barracks were used by the Royal Navy as a training facility for new recruits, initially under the name of HMS Victory IV and then as HMS St George. After the War the barracks were occupied by the 3rd Royal Tank Regiment and were renamed St George Barracks. The barracks were handed over to the 20 Landing Craft Tank Support Regiment, Royal Corps of Transport in 1968 and, after that unit vacated the barracks. They continued in Ministry of Defence civilian use until 1998 when they were handed back to the Crown Estate for disposal; the site was subsequently acquired for residential use.

== Gallery ==
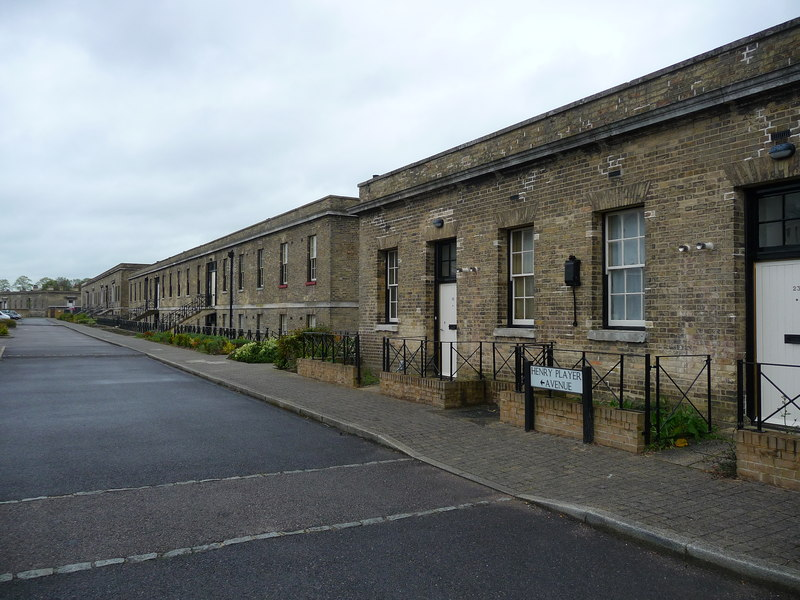
The northern part of the site: at one time these blocks served as married quarters.

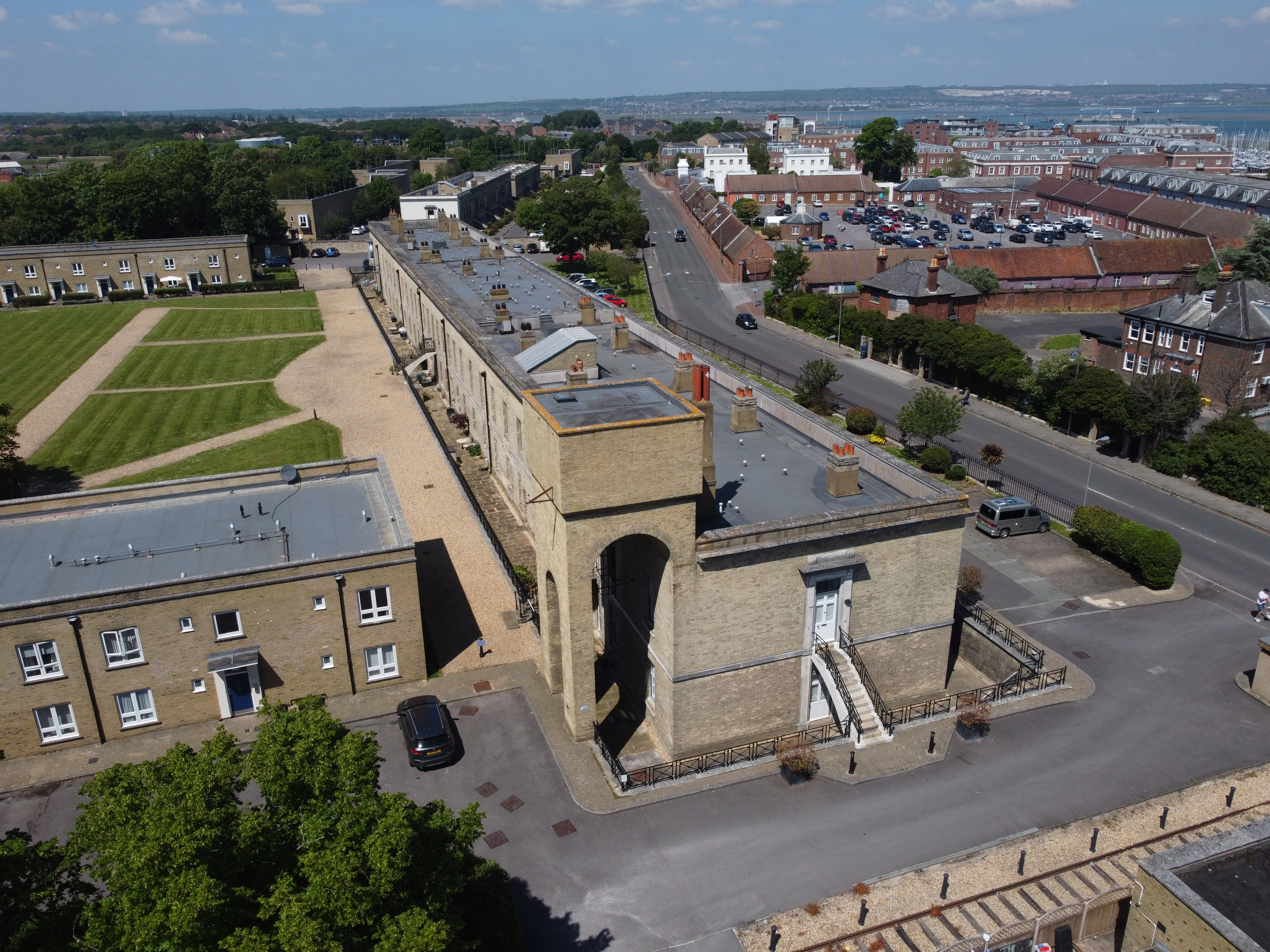
The officers' quarters (viewed from the south).

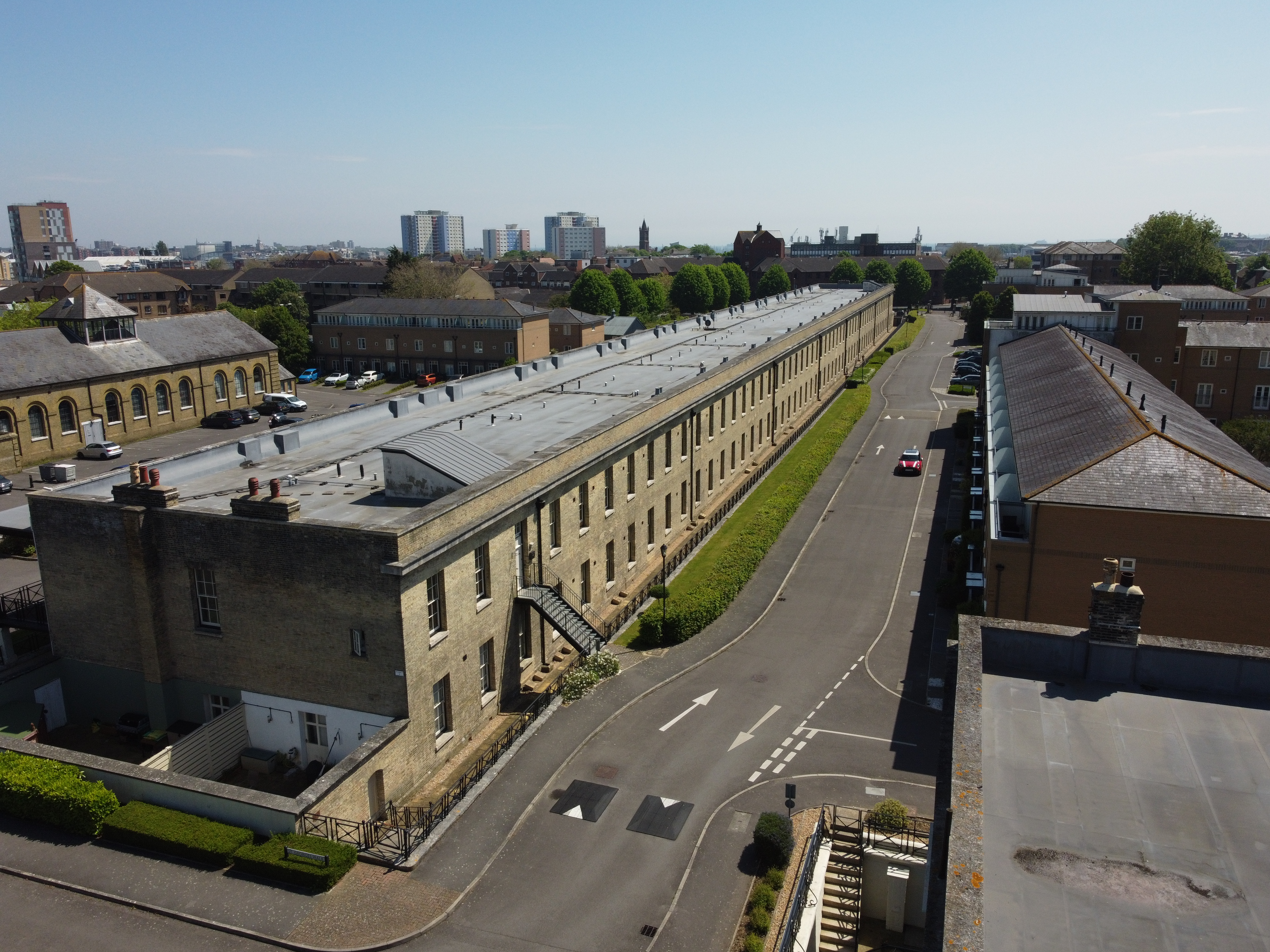
The soldiers' barracks (viewed from the north).

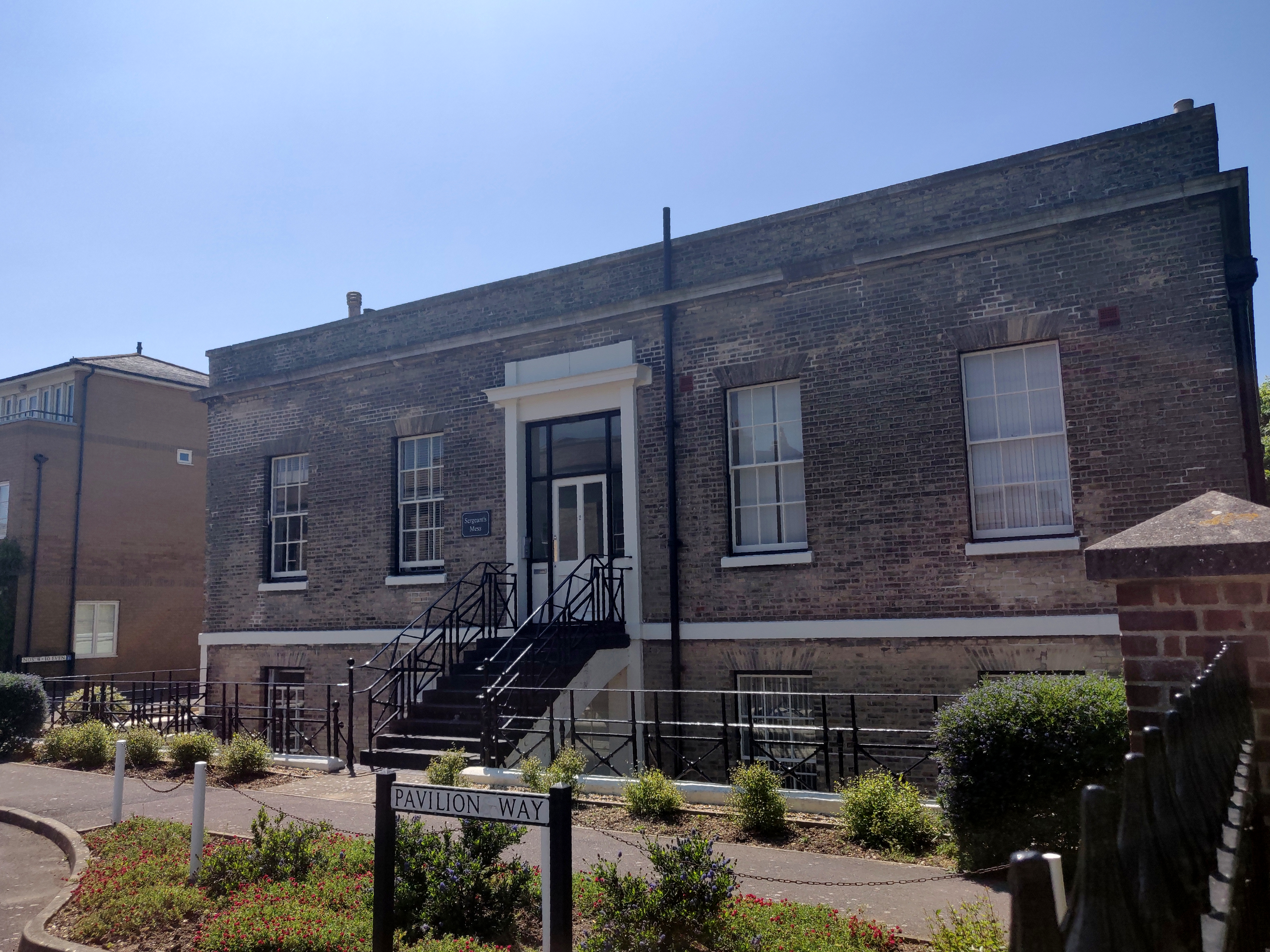
Canteen (later Sergeants' Mess)

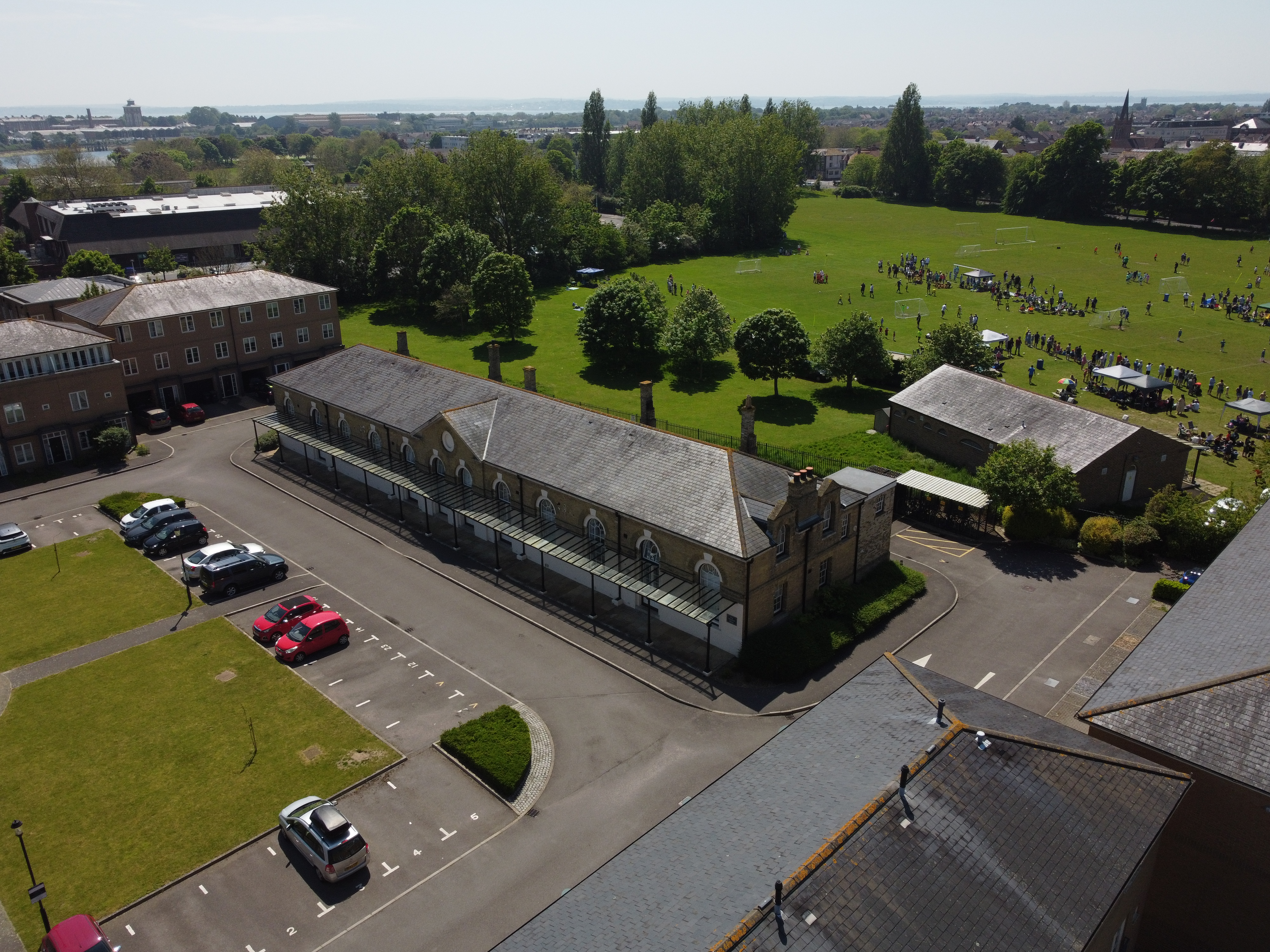
Recreation Block (later Hospital) (c.1860)

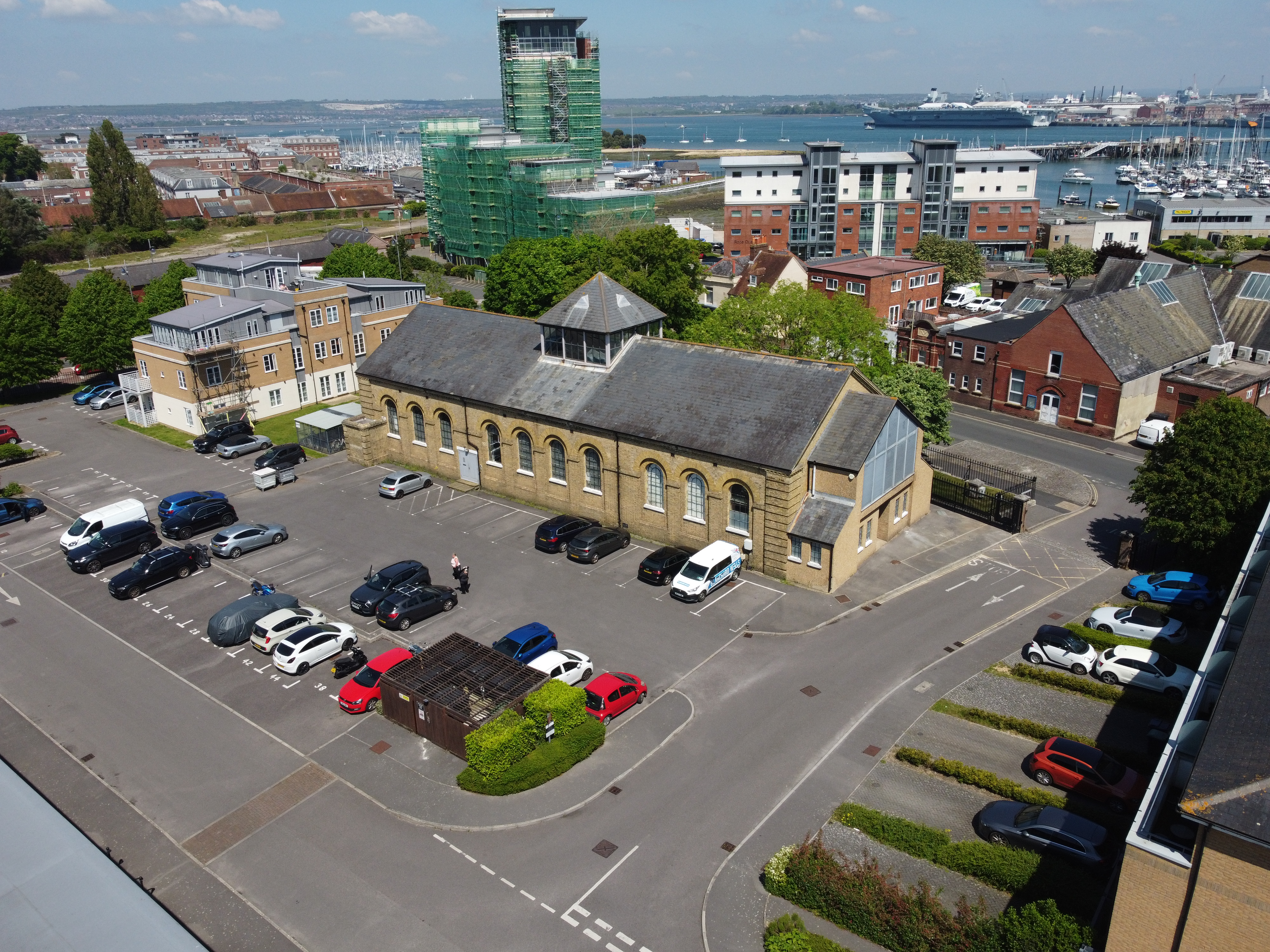
Gymnasium (1868)

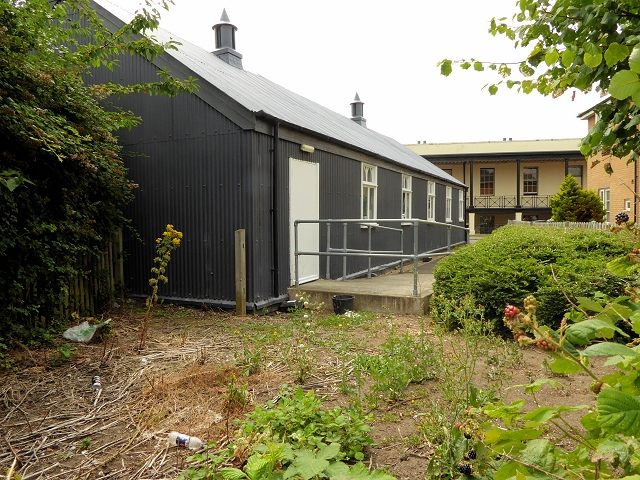
Church (made of corrugated iron, 1891)

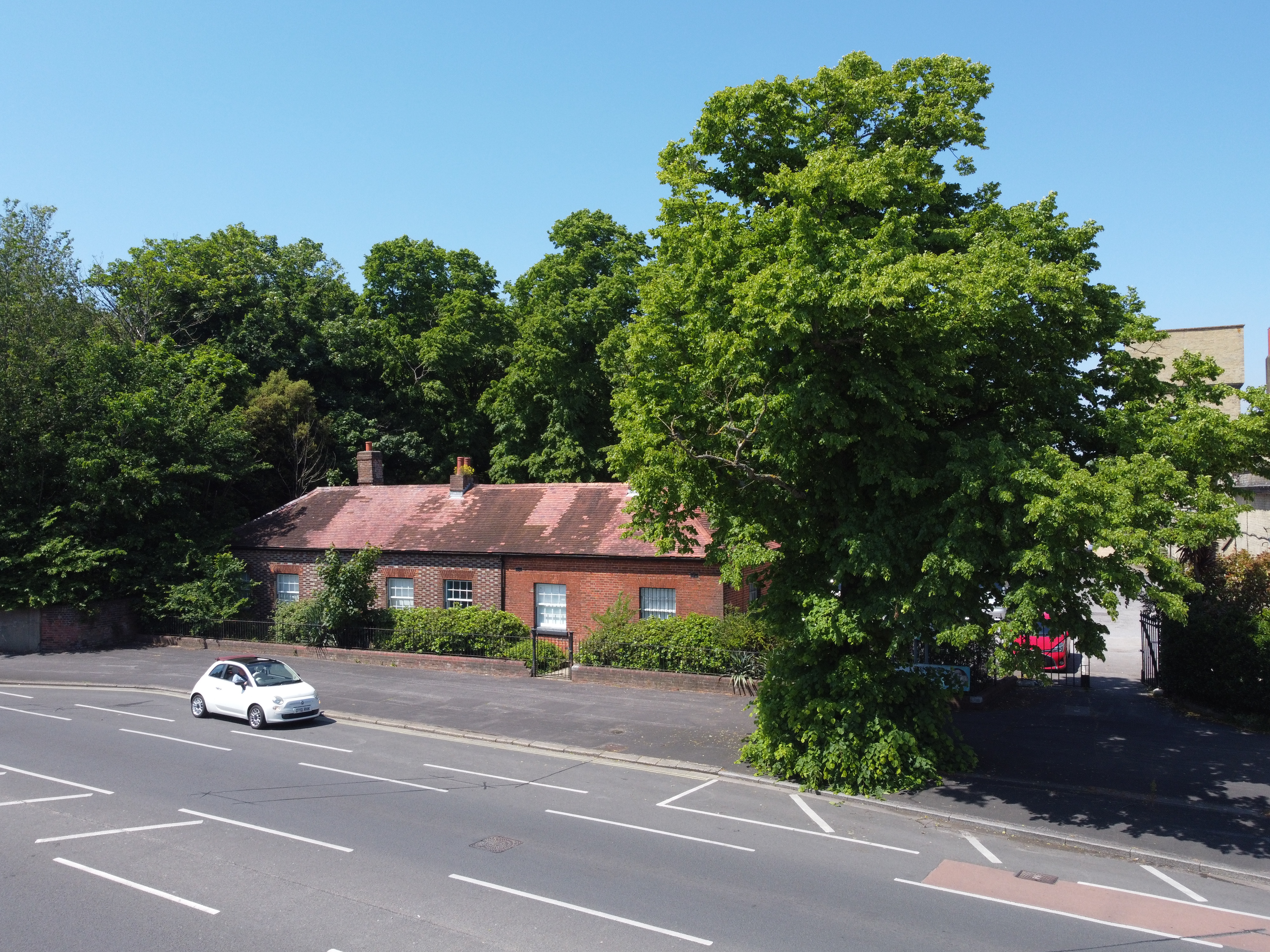
The Master Gunner's quarters next to the guardhouse
