= Delroy Denton =

Jamaican gangster (born c. 1971)

Delroy Samuel Denton (born c. 1971) is a Jamaican gangster, convicted murderer, rapist and suspected serial killer. After illegally immigrating to the United Kingdom, Denton was an informant for Scotland Yard, until he was arrested for the rape and murder of 24-year-old trainee beautician Marcia Lawes in 1995. After his conviction, the fact that he was a police informant at the time of the crime, despite having been denied asylum in Britain, and his status as a fugitive in Jamaica in connection with the murders of seven women (including a prostitute who was stabbed with an icepick), led to a change in the way such informants were handled.

== History ==
Delroy Denton, street name Epsi, had served time in Jamaican prison for firearms violations and armed robbery. Nick Davies, in an article for The Guardian, writes that "police intelligence reports... described him as a murderous participant in street wars, the founder of a Kingston gang known as the Rapid Possee." Denton gained entry to Britain in 1993 or 1994 under a false name.

In May 1994, he was arrested during a police raid of Brixton's Atlantic pub. He gave his name as "Clive Lloyd Johnson" and was charged with intent to distribute and possession of an offensive weapon. Facing deportation Denton applied for political asylum claiming his life was in danger from corrupt politicians in Jamaica. After being approached by Brian Fotheringham and Steve Barker, Denton agreed to become a police informer against Jamaican criminals known as Yardies. He was paid £50 a week and registered as an informant with the Home Office. Although immigration officials reported Delroy to be "... [a] dangerous Jamaican criminal, given 16 years in Jamaica for firearms/aggravated burglary offences" who had fled Jamaica and was wanted for the murders of seven women, he was allowed to remain in the country and released from custody within three days.

While in the service of SO11, the criminal intelligence division of Scotland Yard, Denton committed several violent crimes including the sexual assault of a 15-year-old schoolgirl on 19 December 1994 but on 1 February 1995, the rape charge was dropped due to lack of evidence. The following April, Denton stabbed 24-year-old trainee beautician Marcia Lawes eighteen times after breaking into her Brixton residence and sexually assaulting her. Although initially arrested by police on 28 June, he was released due to lack of evidence on 1 November 1995.

During the investigation into the murder of Lawes, detectives informed Fotheringham of Denton's immigration status, however, he took no action. Barker's superiors were then contacted and Denton was taken off the list of registered informers, but Barker continued to meet with him.

However, because of the protests of senior officials, Denton would later be retried and convicted of Lawes' murder for which he was sentenced to life imprisonment in July 1996. When he was tried for Miss Lawes' murder, he was described as a "premier-league danger to the public" and a "sex-fueled psychopath". His later appeal to the House of Lords, on the grounds that his status as police informer was not divulged to his defense team, was declined.

Going to court, the family of Marcia Lawes successfully petitioned to sue the Metropolitan Police and Home Office on the grounds that, by allowing Denton to be an informer, police had acted unlawfully in permitting a man with a violent criminal record to remain free by endangering the public, the first lawsuit to be brought against the Home Office and London police officials.

The re-investigation into the murder of Delroy Denton was conducted by the original Police Officer a Detective Inspector Cook, who believed the decision to withdraw the charges was flawed. He set out to look for further evidence and have the forensics re-examined as well as the pathologists examination. The Original Pathologist Dr Freddy Patel's opinion was over ruled by the more experienced Pathologist Dr Ian West. New witnesses were found as a result of Denton's behaviour once released and he was eventually re-charged and convicted.

== See also ==
- Eaton Green
