= Mick Delroy =

Australian rugby league footballer

Personal information
- Full name: Michael Delroy
- Born: 3 February 1965 (age 60); Sydney, New South Wales, Australia

Playing information
- Position: Wing
Club
Years	Team	Pld	T	G	FG	P
1986–88	Parramatta Eels	47	10	0	0	40
1989–90	Eastern Suburbs	8	0	0	0	0
	Total	55	10	0	0	40

Mick Delroy (born 3 February 1965) is an Australian former rugby league footballer who played in the 1980s and 1990s. He played for the Parramatta Eels with whom he won the 1986 premiership. Delroy also played for Eastern Suburbs. His position was on the wing.

== Playing career ==
Delroy made his first grade debut for Parramatta in round 11 of the 1986 season against South Sydney.

In the 1986 grand final, Delroy was knocked out in the first half from a tackle by Canterbury winger Andrew Farrar. Parramatta went on to win the match 4–2 in a tryless grand final.

In 2016, Delroy spoke to the media about the grand final victory and said that in the 30 years since the win he had not been to a single reunion or even watched a replay of the game.

In 1989, Delroy made the move to Eastern Suburbs and played eight games for the club over two seasons before retiring at the end of the 1990 season.
