= Michael Moseley (rugby league) =

Australian rugby league footballer

Personal information
- Full name: Michael Moseley
- Born: 13 November 1960 (age 66) Sydney, NSW, Australia

Playing information
- Position: Hooker
Club
Years	Team	Pld	T	G	FG	P
1983–89	Parramatta Eels	92	6	0	0	24

Michael Moseley (born 5th of October 1967Australian former rugby league footballer who played in the 1980s. He played for the Parramatta Eels and was a member of the 1986 premiership winning team.

== Career ==
Moseley made his debut for Parramatta during the 1983 season against Newtown, but only played in one other game for the season and was not a part of the 1983 premiership winning team. In the 1986 grand final, Moseley pulled off a try-saving tackle with only seconds remaining to deny Canterbury victory. Parramatta won the game 4–2, in a tryless grand final. Moseley stayed with Parramatta until the 1989 season, and then retired from rugby league after being released by the club. In 1990, Moseley was made a life member of the Parramatta club.
