= Terry Fearnley =

Australian former RL coach & professional rugby league footballer

Personal information
- Full name: Terence Colin Fearnley
- Born: 21 July 1933 Sydney, Australia
- Died: 4 March 2015 (aged 81) Sydney, Australia

Playing information
- Position: Prop
Club
Years	Team	Pld	T	G	FG	P
1954–64	Eastern Suburbs	144	7	2	0	25
Representative
Years	Team	Pld	T	G	FG	P
1960	New South Wales	1	0	0	0	0

Coaching information
Club
Years	Team	Gms	W	D	L	W%
1976–79	Parramatta	101	68	4	29	67
1982	Western Suburbs	27	16	0	11	59
1983–84	Cronulla-Sutherland	50	22	1	27	44
1988	Illawarra Steelers	22	6	1	15	27
	Total	200	112	6	82	56
Representative
Years	Team	Gms	W	D	L	W%
1977–85	NSW City Firsts	2	2	0	0	100
1977–85	New South Wales	5	4	0	1	80
1977–85	Australia	12	10	0	2	83

Terence Colin Fearnley (21 July 1933 – 4 March 2015) was an Australian rugby league footballer and coach.

== Playing career ==
Fearnley was a long serving member of the NSWRFL's Eastern Suburbs team, playing 144 matches for them at a bleak period in that club's existence in two stints 1954–55 and 1957–64. Injury kept him out of the 1960 grand final, one of the few successful years Eastern Suburbs enjoyed in that period. The front rower however was selected to represent his state, New South Wales that season.

== Coaching career ==
Following his retirement from the game as a player, Fearnley enjoyed a successful coaching career, taking the Parramatta Eels to their first ever Grand Final in 1976 and then again in 1977. He had also been successful coach of the New South Wales rugby league team but stood down at the start of the 1978 NSWRFL season to concentrate on club football. Fearnley moved to coach Western Suburbs Magpies in 1982, Cronulla-Sutherland Sharks (1983–84). Returning to representative coaching in 1985, he became the first successful New South Wales State of Origin coach. He was also selected as Australian coach for the mid-season 1985 Kangaroo tour of New Zealand.

Fearnley moved to coach Illawarra Steelers in 1988.

=== Selection controversy ===
It was during his 1985 tenure as Australian coach that four players – all Queenslanders in Chris Close, Mark Murray, Greg Dowling and Greg Conescu – were controversially sacked in favour of New South Wales players (Steve Ella, Des Hasler, Peter Tunks and Benny Elias), despite Australia having won the first two Tests of the three match series. Fearnley also had a frosty relationship with Australian (and Queensland) captain Wally Lewis, with Lewis claiming to close friend and fellow Maroon Paul Vautin that Fearnley seemed to be conferring on team selections with vice-captain Wayne Pearce (who was also the new NSW captain following Steve Mortimer's representative retirement) rather than Lewis himself. Lewis claimed he had found the pair privately talking over selection of the Test team in Fearnley's hotel room, though this is disputed by Pearce who claimed he was there for different reasons. Dropping the four Queenslanders backfired on Fearnley as New Zealand defeated Australia 18–0 in the final Test of the series at Carlaw Park in Auckland. It was the first time since the final Ashes Test of the 1956–57 Kangaroo Tour that Australia had been held scoreless in a Test match.

Queensland Rugby League Chairman, Senator Ron McAuliffe, publicly condemned the dropping of the four Queensland players from a winning Test side, saying "Its a football assassination and beyond all reasoning. And there can be no reasonable excuse for it".

The NZ tour took place while the 1985 State of Origin series was still in progress. NSW had won the series for the first time, taking the first two games before the Australian team was chosen for the NZ tour. Fearnley would later claim that the Queensland players in the team were unhappy that they'd just lost the Origin series, though he later admitted he didn't handle the situation as well as he could have. In Origin game three that year played at Lang Park, one of the sacked players, Maroons prop Greg Dowling, aimed a tirade of abuse at Fearnley from the sidelines after a Queensland try. The Maroons went on to win the dead rubber game 20–6. NSW captain Steve Mortimer, who announced his representative retirement following the Blues win in game II at the Sydney Cricket Ground, later regretted his decision. After clearly out-playing Maroons half Mark Murray, he was in the box seat to keep his test jumper against the Kiwis (he had been the halfback for the 3rd Ashes Test against the touring Great Britain Lions in Australia's most recent Test in 1984), and as the likely team vice-captain he felt he could have used his personal friendship with both Fearnley and Lewis to ease tensions on the tour.

Because of the controversy surrounding the NZ tour the Australian Rugby League instituted a new rule for national coaching which prevents any current serving State of Origin coach, being the national coach.

Following his retirement as a coach, Fearnley wrote an article for Rugby League Week that was highly critical of Wally Lewis' captaincy. This gained him a rebuke from ARL officials.

=== Death ===
Fearnley died from cancer on 4 March 2015.
