= Bob Lindner =

Australian RL coach and former Australia international rugby league footballer

Personal information
- Full name: Robert Lindner
- Born: 10 November 1962 (age 63) Brisbane, Queensland, Australia

Playing information
- Height: 180 cm (5 ft 11 in)
- Weight: 94 kg (14 st 11 lb; 207 lb)
- Position: Lock, Second-row
Club
Years	Team	Pld	T	G	FG	P
1983–84	Southern Suburbs	29	8	0	0	32
1985–86	Wynnum-Manly	24	11	0	0	44
1986–88	Castleford	19	9	0	0	36
1987–88	Parramatta Eels	28	10	0	0	40
1989	Gold Coast-Tweed	10	0	0	0	0
1990–92	Western Suburbs	39	8	0	0	32
1993	Illawarra Steelers	20	4	0	0	16
1993–94	Oldham RLFC	30	10	0	0	40
	Total	199	60	0	0	240
Representative
Years	Team	Pld	T	G	FG	P
1984–93	Queensland	25	7	0	0	28
1985–93	Australia	22	6	0	0	24

Coaching information
Club
Years	Team	Gms	W	D	L	W%
1994	Oldham RLFC	0	0	0	0
1995–96	South Qld Crushers	43	9	1	33	21
1997	Oldham RLFC	0	0	0	0
	Total	43	9	1	33	21

Bob Lindner (born 10 November 1962) is an Australian former professional rugby league footballer who played in the 1980s and 1990s, and coached in the 1990s. An Australia national and Queensland State of Origin representative forward, he is one of a handful of players to be named man-of-the-match in State of Origin football more than once. Fifteen years after his retirement from football in Australia, he had made the most appearances and scored the most tries of any forward in State of Origin history.

== Brisbane Rugby League ==
Lindner went to Iona College, Brisbane. Lindner played lock for South Brisbane Magpies in the Brisbane Rugby League from 1983 to 1984, playing in South's losing 1984 Grand Final team alongside Mal Meninga, Gary Belcher and Peter Jackson. In 1985 he signed with the team who had defeated Souths in the 1984 Grand Final, the Wynnum-Manly Seagulls, where he played alongside Queensland and Australia captain Wally Lewis, Gene Miles, Greg Dowling and Colin Scott. The 1985 BRL Grand Final saw Souths Magpies defeat Wynnum-Manly 10–8.

Lindner won his only BRL premiership in 1986 as the Seagulls defeated Past Brothers 14–6 in the Grand Final at Lang Park.

== New South Wales rugby league ==
Following his successful Kangaroo tour, Lindner signed with reigning NSWRL premiers, the Parramatta Eels as a much-anticipated replacement for club captain Ray Price, who had retired following the Eels 1986 Grand Final win over Canterbury-Bankstown.

Lindner played in Queensland's 2–1 1987 State of Origin series win and retained his place at lock in the Australian test team for the one-off test against New Zealand at Lang Park which saw the Kiwis cause an upset with a 13–7 win, snapping Australia's 9 game winning streak. At the end of the 1987 NSWRL season, Lindner played a short stint with English club side Castleford (Heritage No. 655) for part of the 1987–88 Rugby Football League season. He scored a try in Castleford's 12–12 draw with Bradford Northern in the 1987 Yorkshire Cup Final at Headingley in Leeds on Saturday 17 October 1987, but he did not play in the 11–2 defeat by Bradford in the final's replay at Elland Road in Leeds two weeks later.

Back in Australia in 1988 following his stint at Wheldon Road (Castleford's home ground), Lindner played in Queensland's 3–0 Origin series sweep of New South Wales before being selected for all three Ashes series tests against the touring Great Britain side. The Australian's defeated the Lions 2–1 to retain The Ashes that they had not lost since 1970.

After 28 games over two seasons for the Eels in which they failed to play finals football, Lindner signed with newly created expansion team, the Gold Coast Giants for the 1989 NSWRL season.

A broken leg suffered in Game 2 of the 1989 State of Origin series at the Sydney Football Stadium saw Lindner ruled out of the Australian teams mid-season tour of New Zealand.

Following his year on the Gold Coast, Lindner signed with Sydney team Western Suburbs for the 1990 NSWRL season. He was named man-of-the-match in the Game III of the 1990 State of Origin series, and at the end of the season was selected to his second Kangaroo Tour. His performances for the 1990 Kangaroos saw him named the player of the tour. Lindner suffered another broken leg in early 1991 but made a strong recovery before breaking the leg again playing in the first test of the 1991 Trans-Tasman series against New Zealand in Melbourne.

1992 saw him named man-of-the-match in the second game of the State of Origin series and during the 1992 Great Britain Lions tour, he helped Australia retain The Ashes, pushing his Test tally to 19, before playing in the 1992 Rugby League World Cup final win over Great Britain at the Wembley Stadium in London.

Wests' salary cap problems saw him join his fourth NSWRL club, the Illawarra Steelers, in 1993, but after playing for Australia in the mid-season test series against New Zealand, and for Queensland in the Origin series (including a try-scoring performance in the Maroons' 24–12 game 3 win, his last game for his state), he announced his intention to leave Australia and play abroad. Lindner's player agent, the Sydney businessman Michael Saad, received many offers and the 24-Test veteran subsequently announced that he had signed for Oldham (Heritage No. 1017).

During the 1993–94 Rugby Football League season, Lindner took over as captain-coach of Oldham following the departure of fellow Australian forward, Peter Tunks and successfully averted the team's relegation to Second Division.

== Post-playing career ==
Lindner then returned to Australia and linked with the short-lived South Queensland Crushers where he was originally recruited as a player but retired in order to replace Bill Gardner as club coach in 1995–96. He stood down as coach in 1997, the Crushers' final year in the Australian Rugby League premiership.

In 2000, Lindner was awarded the Australian Sports Medal for his contribution to Australia's international standing in rugby league. In June 2008, he was chosen in the Queensland Rugby League's Team of the Century at lock-forward.

In 2009, Lindner was a member of the National Rugby League's judiciary panel.

He has also been a qualified Optometrist since 1985. Lindner's university exams actually fell during both his début State of Origin series in 1984, and again in 1985, causing him to have to miss team bonding sessions so he could study.
