= 1984 State of Origin series =

Australian rugby league series

- Won by: Queensland (3rd series title)
- Series margin: 2–1
- Points scored: 91
- Attendance: 79,309 (ave. 26,436 per match)
- Top points scorer(s): Ross Conlon (18)
- Top try scorer(s): Kerry Boustead (4)

The 1984 State of Origin series was the third time the annual three-game series between the representative rugby league football teams of New South Wales and Queensland was played entirely under "state of origin" selection rules. With Queensland wrapping up the series in the first two matches it produced the first dead rubber finish and an infamous opening minute brawl in game II.

== Game I ==
The New South Wales attitude to State of Origin had changed somewhat for the 1984 series, with the Blues squad being excused from their club duties the weekend prior to the first match and undergoing an intensive training camp, signalling the NSWRL's commitment to taking the series seriously. Canterbury-Bankstown halfback Steve Mortimer was originally selected as the Blues halfback, but withdrew with a hamstring injury. Mortimer later confirmed he had actually faked the injury as he wasn't happy with the selection of long-time rival Peter Sterling on the bench. Mortimer felt that with Sterling's Parramatta team mate Ray Price as team captain, he would not have a voice or be able to run the team on the field as he wished to. Sterling was elevated to the starting line up after Mortimer's withdrawal with St George's Brian Hetherington selected as the reserve back.

Tuesday, 29 May 1984

Queensland	29–12	New South Wales
(12 - 3 t) Kerry Boustead (4 - 1 t) Paul Vautin (5 - 1 t, 1 fg) Wally Lewis (4 - 1 t) Gene Miles (4 - 2 g) Mal Meninga	(Report)	Ross Conlon (8 - 4 g); Noel Cleal (4 - 1 t)

Lang Park
Attendance: 33,662
Referee: Kevin Roberts
Player of the Match: Wally Lewis

Queensland were motivated by the announcement that New South Wales coach Frank Stanton had been appointed as Australian national coach for the upcoming Ashes series against Great Britain. Queensland's own coach and favoured Origin son, Arthur Beetson was being dumped in favour of Stanton and notwithstanding that Stanton was merely returning to the helm having previously steered the national side on two triumphant Kangaroo tours, the Maroons were keen to avenge the honour of Beetson who had been dumped as Australian coach following the Kangaroos 19–12 loss to New Zealand at Lang Park in 1983.

The Maroons won the match 29–12 with Manly-Warringah winger Kerry Boustead achieving the rare Origin honour of scoring three tries. Mal Meninga had a poor night with the boot, only kicking two goals from eight attempts. It was rumoured that this ultimately cost him a place in the Australian team for the first Ashes test with NSW goalkicking winger Ross Conlon winning a spot on the wing.

== Game II ==
Tuesday, 19 June 1984

Queensland	14–2	New South Wales
(4 - 1 t) Greg Dowling (4 - 1 t) Gene Miles (6 - 3 g) Mal Meninga	(Report)	Ross Conlon (2 - 1 g)

Sydney Cricket Ground
Attendance: 29,088
Referee: Barry Gomersall
Player of the Match: Wally Lewis

Game II was played on a cold and wet night that saw almost 30,000 cram into the Sydney Cricket Ground, signalling that the New South Wales public had finally embraced the Origin concept. The mud, rain and tolerant eye of referee Barry Gomersall combined to form an explosive mix. Progress was arduous in the SCG quagmire and handling almost impossible.

Blues prop Steve Roach triggered an all-in brawl in the second tackle of the match with players trading blows for more than a minute afterwards in three separate melees. The sight of Chris Close, his jumper torn off, going blow-for-blow with New South Wales lock Ray Price became an enduring Origin image. When order was finally restored, Gomersall merely awarded a penalty against the Blues (which he had already called just as the fight started) and allowed play to continue.

Both sides dug in for a slogging defensive contest and not surprisingly, when Gomersall called a halt for half-time, neither side had scored. So bad were conditions, Blues second-rower Noel Cleal attempted a line drop out only for the ball to stick in the gluey mud and trickle a metre forward. In contrast, Wally Lewis had earlier kicked a drop out some 40 metres downfield which drew a glare from Gomersall, especially as a quarter line drop out from Lewis just 10 minutes into the game had barely travelled 10 metres. Lewis later admitted that he had distracted Gomersall by calling for his team to stay onside. When Gomersall looked away to check, Lewis kicked the ball but caught it before it hit the ground. The deadlock was only broken when Mal Meninga landed a penalty goal. shortly afterwards Queensland prop Greg Dowling scored a memorable Origin try. Lewis had been peppering the New South wales line with his searching kicks and chipped ahead, aiming for the in-goal area. In a moment of good fortune for the Maroons the ball struck the cross-bar and Dowling who had been following through, took an extraordinary catch on his finger tips centimetres from the rain soaked ground and plunged across the line in a splash of mud to score and give Queensland an 8–0 lead.

The Blues responded with a penalty goal to winger Ross Conlon reducing the Queensland lead to a converted try but when Maroon centre Gene Miles powered his way over the line from dummy half, the Queensland lead extended to 14–2 and there was no way back for the Blues.

== Game III ==
With the series decided in Sydney, game III at Lang Park became a dead-rubber but was significant for the selection of Canterbury Bulldogs half-back Steve Mortimer as captain of New South Wales for the first time after Ray Price had elected to stand down from representative football following the third Ashes Test.

New South Wales selectors took the opportunity to blood a number of young players for the first time like Chris Mortimer, Pat Jarvis and Peter Wynn who along with Mortimer would play dominant roles in the Blues revival of 1985.

Tuesday, 17 July 1984

New South Wales	22–12	Queensland
(10 - 5 g) Ross Conlon (8 - 2 t) Brian Johnston (4 - 1 t) Noel Cleal	(Report)	Kerry Boustead (4 - 1 t); Bob Lindner (4 - 1 t); Mal Meninga (4 - 2 g)

Lang Park
Attendance: 16,559
Referee: Kevin Roberts
Player of the Match: Steve Mortimer

Mortimer inspired New South Wales to a 22–12 victory which avoided the embarrassment of a series whitewash and earned for himself the man of the match award.

== Teams ==
=== New South Wales Blues ===
Position	Game 1	Game 2	Game 3
Fullback	Garry Jack		
Wing	Eric Grothe, Sr.		Steve Morris
Centre	Steve Ella	Andrew Farrar	Chris Mortimer
Centre	Brett Kenny		Brian Johnston
Wing	Ross Conlon		
Five-eighth	Alan Thompson	Terry Lamb	Brett Kenny
Halfback	Peter Sterling	Steve Mortimer	Steve Mortimer (c)
Prop	Steve Roach		
Hooker	Rex Wright	Royce Simmons	
Prop	Craig Young	Peter Tunks	Pat Jarvis
Second row	Noel Cleal		
Second row	Wayne Pearce		Chris Walsh
Lock	Ray Price (c)		Peter Wynn
Interchange	Brian Hetherington	Steve Ella	Mick Potter
Interchange	Pat Jarvis		Peter Tunks
Coach	Frank Stanton		

=== Queensland Maroons ===
Position	Game 1	Game 2	Game 3
Fullback	Colin Scott		
Wing	Kerry Boustead		John Ribot
Centre	Mal Meninga	Chris Close	Mal Meninga
Centre	Gene Miles		Brett French
Wing	Chris Close	Mal Meninga	Kerry Boustead
Five-eighth	Wally Lewis (c)		
Halfback	Mark Murray		Ross Henrick
Prop	Greg Dowling		
Hooker	Greg Conescu		
Prop	Dave Brown		
Second row	Bryan Niebling		Chris Phelan
Second row	Wally Fullerton Smith		
Lock	Paul Vautin		Bob Lindner
Interchange	Brett French	Bob Lindner	Bob Kellaway
Interchange	Bob Lindner	Tony Currie	
Coach	Arthur Beetson		

== See also ==
- 1984 NSWRL season

== Sources ==
- Big League's 25 Years of Origin Collectors' Edition, News Magazines, Surry Hills, Sydney
