= 1985 State of Origin series =

Australian rugby league series

- Won by: New South Wales (1st title)
- Series margin: 2-1
- Points scored: 81
- Attendance: 90,937 (ave. 30,312 per match)
- Top points scorer(s): Michael O'Connor (29)
- Top try scorer(s): Michael O'Connor (2); Dale Shearer (2)

The 1985 State of Origin series was the fourth time the annual three-match series between New South Wales and Queensland was contested entirely under 'state of origin' selection rules. It was the year that New South Wales finally ended Queensland's dominance which had arisen with the State of Origin concept.

== Games ==
=== Game I ===
Queensland centre Gene Miles was ruled out of State of Origin due to a knee injury.

Tuesday, 28 May 1985

New South Wales	18–2	Queensland
(18 - 2 t, 5g) Michael O'Connor	(Report)	Mal Meninga (2 - 1 g)

Lang Park, Brisbane, Queensland
Attendance: 33,011
Referee: Kelvin Roberts
Player of the Match: Peter Wynn

Heavy rain confronted the players at Lang Park when the teams took the field for the opening match of the series, and it was thought players new to Origin football such as Michael O'Connor might struggle to cope with the conditions. However the former Wallaby displayed nerves of steel to complete one of Origin's most memorable debuts scoring two tries and kicking five goals to finish with all 18 of the Blues' points. In the Queensland rooms after the game, a far from happy Queensland Rugby League Chairman, Federal Senator Ron McAuliffe was heard to darkly remark that they were "Beaten by an ex-Queensland rugby bloody union international"

The relentless Blues defence led by Steve Roach, Pat Jarvis and Peter Wynn continually repelled the Maroons and helped keep the Blues line intact for the first time at Origin level. Five-eighth Brett Kenny earned wide praise for his efforts opposite Wally Lewis who was subjected to merciless pressure for almost the entire match. New coach Terry Fearnley and his captain Steve Mortimer had plotted for months to uncover a secret factor that would bring an end to the Maroons' Origin stranglehold. The strategy was to heap pressure on Lewis, Queensland's five-eighth and playmaker and the Blues carried out the plan perfectly.

=== Game II ===
Tuesday, 11 June 1985

New South Wales	21–14	Queensland
(4 - 1 t) Chris Mortimer (4 - 1 t) Benny Elias (4 - 1 t) Brett Kenny (9 - 4 g, 1 fg) Michael O'Connor	(Report)	Bob Lindner(4 - 1 t); Ian French (4 - 1 t); Mal Meninga (6 - 3 g)

Sydney Cricket Ground
Attendance: 39,068
Referee: Barry Gomersall
Player of the Match: Wally Lewis

With history possibly in the making a large New South Wales home crowd turned out in wet conditions at the Sydney Cricket Ground. The match was played on a knife's edge when after the Blues had taken a 12–0 lead with two tries after only 16 minutes, Queensland struck back in typical style and took a 14–12 lead despite having lost Bob Lindner and Colin Scott with serious injuries.

The New South Wales forwards relentlessly hurled themselves at the Queensland defence until cracks slowly began to appear. A penalty goal and then a sharply taken field goal by O'Connor gave the Blues a 15–14 lead and then when Lewis attempted to level the scores with his own field goal attempt eight minutes from the end, Mortimer flew from the ruck to charge down the kick.

Five-eighth Brett Kenny scored the decisive try a minute from full-time, prompting celebrations among the New South Wales players. Broadcast images from the match showed Mortimer being chaired off the field, following the Blues' first series victory.

=== Game III ===
Tuesday, 23 July 1985

Queensland	20–6	New South Wales
(8 - 2 t ) Dale Shearer (4 - 1 t) John Ribot (4 - 1 t) Ian French (4 - 2 g) Mal Meninga	(Report)	Steve Ella (4 - 1 t); Michael O'Connor (2 - 1 g)

Lang Park
Attendance: 18,825
Referee: Barry Gomersall
Player of the Match: Wally Fullerton Smith

Queensland took the field in Game III determined to avoid a whitewash but also smarting from a national selection controversy. Blues coach Terry Fearnley was also the Australian national coach and the match was played after the Australia v New Zealand Test series that year. Fearnley had dropped five players, four of them Maroons, after the second Test win. The Kiwis went on to win the third Test 18–0, the first time the Australians had been held scoreless in a Test match since the 3rd Ashes Test on the 1956–57 Kangaroo tour.

Queensland came out breathing fire and as the score mounted, late in the game Maroons forward Greg Dowling, one of the players axed by Fearnley, left the field replaced and stopped by the Blues bench to give Fearnley a passionate serve and tirade of abuse. Following this event ARL officials would legislate that the national coach never be a serving Origin coach to avoid the possibility of such embarrassing scenes or the potential for claims of bias.

== Teams ==
=== New South Wales ===
With the departure of Frank Stanton, Terry Fearnley was brought in to coach the New South Wales side.

Position	Game 1	Game 2	Game 3
Fullback	Garry Jack		
Wing	Eric Grothe, Sr.		
Centre	Michael O'Connor		
Centre	Chris Mortimer		
Wing	John Ferguson		
Five-Eighth	Brett Kenny		
Halfback	Steve Mortimer (c)		Des Hasler
Prop	Steve Roach		
Hooker	Ben Elias		
Prop	Pat Jarvis		
Second Row	Noel Cleal		David Brooks
Second Row	Peter Wynn		
Lock	Wayne Pearce		Wayne Pearce (c)
Replacement	Steve Ella		
Replacement	Peter Tunks		Tony Rampling
Coach	Terry Fearnley		

=== Queensland ===
With the departure of Arthur Beetson, 1984 Brisbane Rugby League season-winning Wynnum Manly Seagulls coach, Des Morris was brought in to coach Queensland for the 1985 series.

Position	Game 1	Game 2	Game 3
Fullback	Colin Scott		
Wing	John Ribot		
Centre	Mal Meninga		
Centre	Chris Close		
Wing	Dale Shearer		
Five-Eighth	Wally Lewis (c)		
Halfback	Mark Murray		
Prop	Greg Dowling		
Hooker	Greg Conescu		
Prop	Dave Brown		
Second Row	Paul Vautin		Ian French
Second Row	Paul McCabe	Wally Fullerton-Smith	
Lock	Bob Lindner		Paul Vautin
Replacement	Brett French	Tony Currie	
Replacement	Ian French		Cavill Heugh
Coach	Des Morris		

== See also ==
- 1985 Winfield Cup

== Footnotes ==
- Big League's 25 Years of Origin Collectors' Edition, News Magazines, Surry Hills, Sydney
