= Graeme Wynn =

Australian rugby league footballer (born 1959)

Graeme Wynn OAM
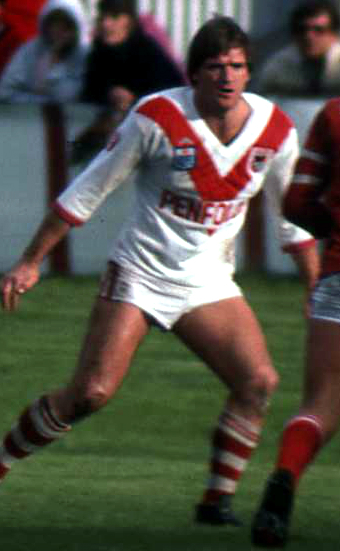

Personal information
- Full name: Graeme Anthony Wynn
- Born: 19 April 1959 (age 67) Thirroul, New South Wales, Australia

Playing information
- Height: 189 cm (6 ft 2 in)
- Weight: 100 kg (15 st 10 lb)
- Position: Second-row
Club
Years	Team	Pld	T	G	FG	P
1977–78	Wests Newcastle
1979–90	St. George	197	46	120	0	400
1991–92	Western Suburbs	41	2	0	0	8
	Total	238	48	120	0	408
Representative
Years	Team	Pld	T	G	FG	P
1980	NSW Country	2	1	3	0	9
1980	NSW City	1	2	0	0	2
1980	New South Wales	3	1	3	0	9
1980	Australia	0	0	0	0	0
- Relatives: Peter Wynn (brother)

Graeme Wynn (born 19 April 1959) is an Australian former professional rugby league footballer who played for the St. George Dragons and the Western Suburbs Magpies in the New South Wales Rugby League premiership. His position of choice was at second-row forward, where his height and strong build made him among the most powerful runners in the game during the 1980s.

== Background ==
Wynn was born in Thirroul, New South Wales, Australia.

== Career ==
The lanky younger brother of rugby league player Peter Wynn of Parramatta, Wynn represented the Jack Gibson-coached New South Wales under-18s in 1977. The next year he won a premiership with Western Suburbs in the Newcastle competition, scoring 17 points in the grand final, and went on to represent Country NSW. That sparkling form saw him receive a contract from the St George Dragons to start with them in 1979.

St George Dragons

He stunned the rugby league world as a 19-year-old in 1979 with his powerful running wide of the rucks propelled by long, powerful legs. His ability to break defensive lines created attacking runs and tries for St George Dragons in his debut year. Wynn was described as playing, "a major role in the club's grand final win over Canterbury with his great attacking game," as they won their second premiership in three years. Although he was beaten by his brother to selection in representative teams, Graeme was named "Rookie of the Year". The following year he played, "an astounding game," for New South Wales in the inaugural State of Origin match and went on to be selected in the Australian squad for that season's New Zealand tour.

Wynn did not play in a Test but was reserve for both tests and in the following years was subject to a serious knee injury and then to a suspension for twelve matches for biting Parramatta Eels Ray Price. He was adamant in his denial of the biting charge, saying, "I feel I've been branded. I'm innocent of this charge. I wonder if I can ever live it down. After 19 years without a blemish on my record." He was the first player to be suspended for biting by the NSWRL.

Described as "an accomplished goalkicker" in his early days, Wynn no longer kicked after the 1982 season. Nonetheless, Wynn remained a vital part of St. George's big forward pack right up to their minor premiership win in 1985. However, Wynn was strong in the Grand Final, being replaced with 10 minutes to go after being king hit by Peter Kelly. In 1988, he was to play for Chorley Borough in England, but left without taking the field. In the later years at St.George his form was strong Had a sensational game at the opening of the Sydney Football Stadium Sydney where he scored two barnstorming tries), and he also played in the victorious Dragons team that won the 1988 Panasonic Cup.

Warren Ryan, however, thought Wynn still had something left in him and he won a first-grade berth with the Western Suburbs Magpies in 1991 and played solidly. Graeme won a new contract at the age of thirty-two, and was again a member of the Magpies semi-finals team, but was used mainly as a reserve and retired at the end of 1992.

Wynn was awarded the Medal of the Order of Australia in the 2025 Australia Day Honours.

== Sources ==
- Alan Whiticker & Glen Hudson (2007). The Encyclopedia of Rugby League Players. Wetherill Park, New South Wales: Gary Allen Pty Ltd. ISBN 978-1-877082-93-1.
