= Mal Meninga =

Australia international rugby league footballer & coach (born 1960)

Mal Meninga AM

Personal information
- Full name: Malcolm Norman Meninga
- Born: 8 July 1960 (age 66) Bundaberg, Queensland, Australia

Playing information
- Height: 184 cm (6 ft 0 in)
- Weight: 107 kg (16 st 12 lb)
- Position: Centre
Club
Years	Team	Pld	T	G	FG	P
1979–85	Southern Suburbs	109	78	314	0	894
1984–85	St Helens	31	28	8	0	128
1986–94	Canberra Raiders	166	74	283	2	864
	Total	306	180	605	2	1886
Representative
Years	Team	Pld	T	G	FG	P
1979–85	Brisbane	23	8	52	0	130
1979–94	Queensland	32	6	69	0	161
1981	South Queensland	1	5	9	0	33
1982–94	Australia	46	21	96	0	272
1988	Prime Minister's XIII	1	1	2	0	8

Coaching information
Club
Years	Team	Gms	W	D	L	W%
1997–01	Canberra Raiders	125	66	2	57	53
2027–	Perth Bears	0	0	0	0
	Total	125	66	2	57	53
Representative
Years	Team	Gms	W	D	L	W%
2005–12	Prime Minister's XIII	8	7	1	0	88
2006–15	Queensland	30	20	0	10	67
2014–15	Papua New Guinea	2	1	0	1	50
2015	PNG PM's XIII	1	0	0	1	0
2016–24	Australia	28	25	0	3	89
2016–23	Prime Minister's XIII	6	6	0	0	100
2017	World All Stars	1	0	0	1	0

Malcolm Norman Meninga AM (/məˈnɪŋɡə/; born 8 July 1960) is an Australian professional rugby league coach who is the head coach of the Perth Bears in the National Rugby League (NRL) and a former professional rugby league footballer.

He previously coached the Australian national team, the Queensland Maroons, the Papua New Guinea national rugby league team and the Canberra Raiders.

After a lengthy career in both Australia and England, mainly as a goal-kicking centre, Meninga is widely regarded as one of the finest players in the game's history. Having broken numerous rugby league records, he retired with the most appearances in the history of the Australian national team, and became the top-point scorer ever in State of Origin football.

Meninga has since been honoured as a Member of the Order of Australia, inducted into the Australian Rugby League Hall of Fame, and named in both Queensland's and Australia's teams of the twentieth century.

Meninga is the only player in history to be selected for four Kangaroo Tours - 1982, 1986, 1990 and 1994 - appearing in every test match against Great Britain and France on all four tours. He is also the only player to captain two Kangaroo Tours (1990 and 1994). Additionally, Meninga is one of five players (along with Wally Lewis, Peter Sterling, Brett Kenny and Gene Miles) who were members of the undefeated 1982 and 1986 tours, known as 'the Invincibles' and 'the Unbeatables' respectively.

In 2018, Meninga was inducted as the 13th Immortal of rugby league.

== Early life ==
Meninga, whose father is of South Sea Islander heritage and mother is a white Australian, was born in Bundaberg, Queensland. His father, Norman Meninga, also played rugby league. He has a brother, Geoffrey Meninga.

As detailed on Who Do You Think You Are? in 2016, Meninga's great-grandfather Edward Meninga was from Tanna, Vanuatu. Meninga has often been misidentified as an Aboriginal Australian.

Meninga attended Maroochydore State High School, graduating with a Junior Certificate in 1975. He completed his Senior Certificate at the Queensland Police Academy, citing his love for TV police dramas as a key reason for joining the force, and served as an officer in the Queensland Police Service until 1985. It was during his time in the police force that Meninga met Wayne Bennett, who was serving as a constable at the time and would become one of Meninga's key mentors.

== Playing career ==
Meninga captained Australia for twenty-three Test matches between 1990 and 1994, and captained the Queensland State of Origin team for three years from 1992 to 1994. He remains the only player to captain two Kangaroo tours, in 1990 and 1994.

I'd watch in awe as Mal pulverised the opposing defensive line with his bone-crunching runs. From the safety of my spot six or seven metres away from the action, I felt grateful that I didn't have to tackle him because his giant thighs were lethal weapons.

Bill Harrigan

=== Brisbane ===
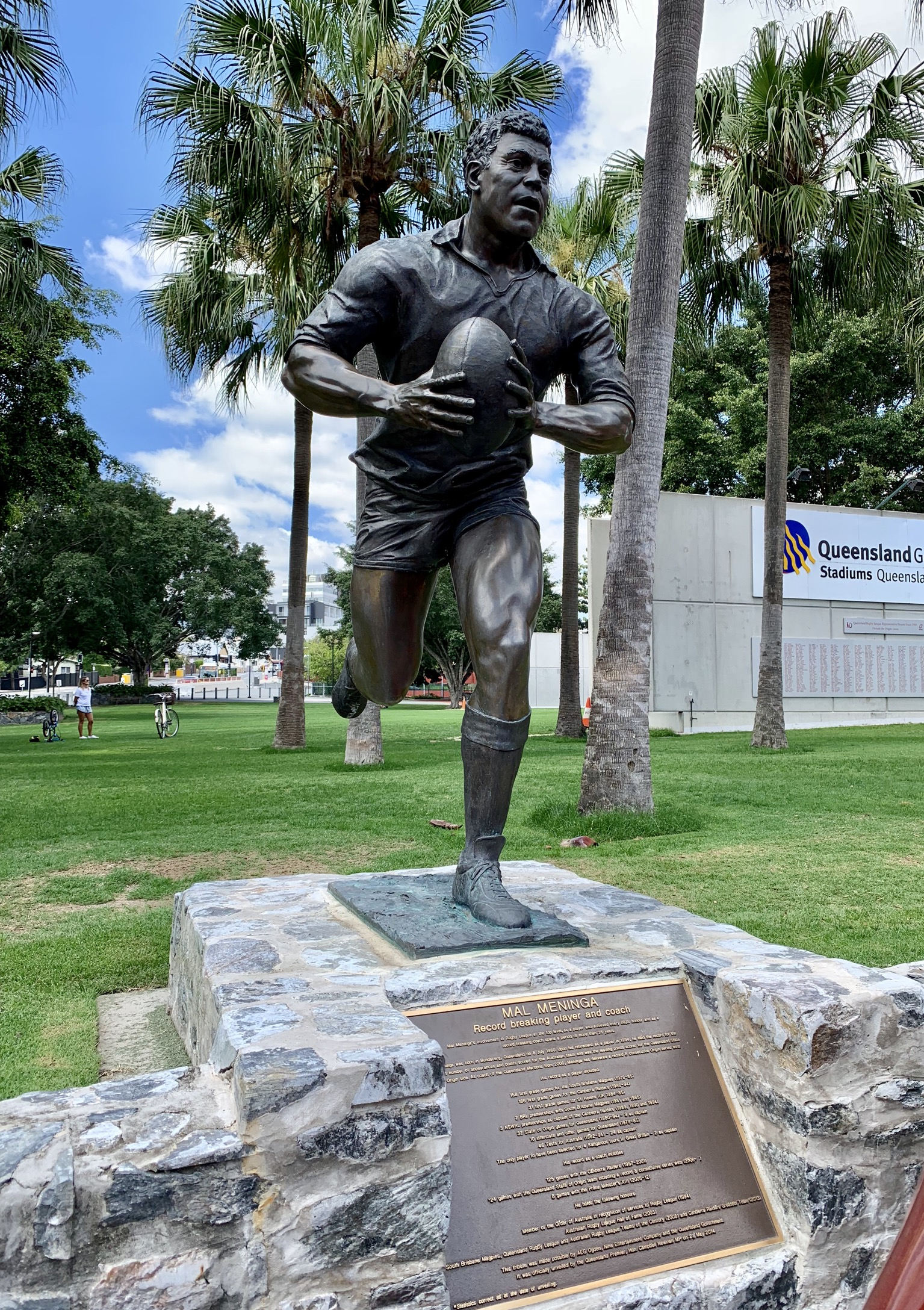
Mal Meninga statue at Lang Park, Brisbane

Meninga made his first grade début in the Brisbane Rugby League premiership at the age of 18 with Southern Suburbs. He was selected to play for Brisbane in the 1979 Amco Cup, kicking a goal in their 5–22 final loss to Cronulla-Sutherland Sharks. Meninga also made his first appearance at centre for Queensland in 1979, and the following year helped his state to win the first interstate match under State of Origin selection rules against New South Wales at Lang Park, kicking seven goals from seven attempts. Meninga was one of the last players to use the toe-poke kicking style rather than the more accurate around-the-corner style that was starting to take hold. That Origin game was on 8 July 1980, Meninga's 20th birthday. Later that year, he played for Souths in the BRL grand final, scoring a try and kicking 3 goals as the Magpies went down to Northern Suburbs 17–15. Meninga finished the 1980 season as the BRL's top points scorer, with 245 points. A year later however Meninga reached the 1981 Brisbane Rugby League season grand final with Souths, who defeated the Redcliffe Dolphins 13–9.

In 1982, he was named man-of-the-match in Game 1 of 1982 State of Origin series against New South Wales at Lang Park, and was later selected to make his test début for Australia in a test against New Zealand at the Sydney Cricket Ground, being the 540th player selected for Australia. Meninga had an unhappy game though, dislocating his elbow in the 28th minute after a crunching blindside tackle from Kiwi winger Dane O'Hara, while at the same time attempting to break a tackle from Kiwi fullback Gary Kemble. He soon recovered and played in the centres for Souths in their 17–3 loss to the Wynnum Manly Seagulls in the BRL Grand Final at Lang Park.

Post season he toured Europe with the undefeated 1982 Kangaroos, playing in all six tests on tour against Papua New Guinea, Great Britain and France. Meninga was the Kangaroos top point scorer on tour, scoring 166 from 10 tries (worth 3 points) and 68 goals, including a personal haul of 19 points (1 try, 8 goals) in the first Ashes series test against Great Britain at Boothferry Park in Hull. He then backed that up with 15 points (1 try, 6 goals) in the second test at Wigan's Central Park, before adding a further 14 points (7 goals) to his Ashes tally in the third test at Headingley in Leeds. The 1982 Kangaroos, the first touring team to go through Great Britain and France undefeated, earned the Frank Stanton coached team the nickname "The Invincibles".

Meninga continued his good form in 1983, even though Souths missed the BRL Grand Final. He played in Queensland's second straight Origin series win over NSW, while also starring for Australia in the two test series against New Zealand in mid-season.

In 1984, Meninga played a major role in an Oceania team's 54–4 victory over an Anglo-French selection in an exhibition match Paris, before returning to Brisbane after the match to continue playing for Souths. After again playing a leading role for Queensland in their third straight Origin series win over NSW, Meninga missed the first Ashes test against the touring Great Britain side, but was recalled to the team for the second and third tests of the series which Australia again won 3–0. Meninga was the BRL's top tryscorer and points scorer in the 1984 season, with 18 tries and 154 points.

Meninga continued his good form for Souths in 1985, playing in their 10–8 Grand Final win over Wynnum-Manly. 1985 also saw NSW win the Origin series for the first time, though Mal was selected for the mid-season Kangaroo Tour of New Zealand. Australia won the test series 2–1 against the Kiwis with Meninga in the centres for each test, but on a tour that had seen the NSW vs Qld rivalry come into play in an Australian team, New Zealand won the dead rubber 3rd test at Carlaw Park in Auckland 18–0.

=== St Helens ===
After his displays on the 1982 Kangaroo tour, Meninga was in high demand with English club sides. For the 1984–85 Rugby Football League season he signed to play for St. Helens, who had paid around £30,000 for his services to play in the Australian off-season and he helped the club to victory in the Premiership. He was bought by BBC commentator and former Saints forward Ray French while he was in Australia covering the 1984 Great Britain Lions tour.

St Helens' rivals Wigan were also after him and had papers ready for him to sign. French had accidentally left the St Helens contract in his hotel room so asked Wigan chairman Maurice Lindsay if he could borrow his; unbelievably, the normally astute Lindsay agreed and handed over the papers. French crossed out any reference to Wigan and changed it to "St Helens" instead, stealing the star from under their noses. Mal Meninga played at centre and scored 2-tries in St. Helens 28–16 victory over Wigan in the 1984 Lancashire Cup Final during the 1984–85 season at Central Park, Wigan on Sunday 28 October 1984. On 11 May 1985 Meninga added further silverware, scoring two memorable long-range tries as St Helens defeated Hull Kingston Rovers 36–16 in the Premiership Final. Meninga didn't manage to serve a second spell at Knowsley Road, for a variety of reasons, not least being a succession of injuries (three broken arms suffered in 1987 and 1988 respectively) that also punctuated his career in Australia. Yet he remains a legendary figure in international rugby league, and his season at St Helens has been described as the most significant of any overseas import in Britain.

=== Canberra ===
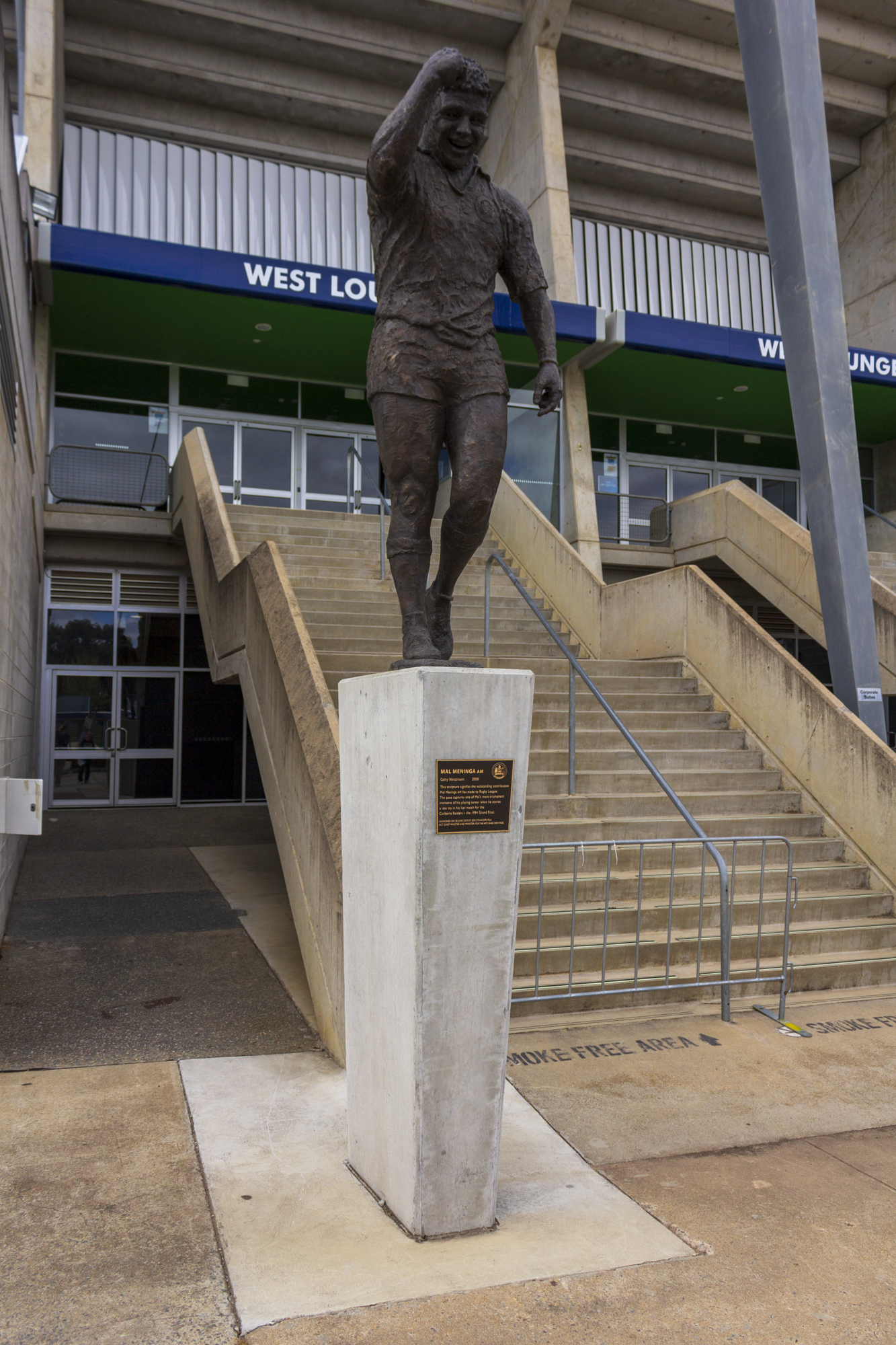
Mal Meninga's statue at Canberra Stadium

In 1986, Meninga and teammate Gary Belcher left Southern Suburbs to play for the Canberra Raiders in the New South Wales Rugby League. Souths coach Wayne Bennett would join them at the club in 1987 as co-coach alongside Australian national coach Don Furner. Despite suffering a broken arm in a sickening collision with the goal posts in the Raider's Round 10 match with Manly-Warringah at the Raiders then home ground Seiffert Oval and subsequently missing 10 weeks (including Queensland's successful 1987 State of Origin series and the one-off test loss against New Zealand), Meninga returned to play in Canberra's 18–8 loss to Manly in that year's Grand Final at the SCG, the last ever Grand Final to be held at the ground. On an unseasonably warm day, Meninga's lack of match fitness since his return told (he had only played 60 minutes of the Preliminary final win over Eastern Suburbs the week before) and he was finally replaced by Raiders reserve back Kevin Walters midway through the second half. He scored the Raiders first points in their maiden Grand Final appearance with a penalty goal early in the second half to reduce the deficit to 6–2 after eventual Clive Churchill Medal winner Cliff Lyons had scored for the Sea Eagles before half time allowing them to take a 6–0 lead into the break.

A second broken arm before the start of the 1988 NSWRL season saw Meninga missing until Round 15. After just 4 games back for the Raiders, Meninga played for Australia in their record 70–8 win over Papua New Guinea at Wagga Wagga in country NSW, scoring two tries. Unfortunately for Meninga, after one more game for Canberra he then broke his arm for a third time in Australia's 22–10 over a Rest of the World team at the Sydney Football Stadium, putting him out for the rest of the 1988 NSWRL season. Meninga's broken arms saw him play only 17 games for the Raiders in 1987 and 1988. His third also saw him miss a place in Australia's 25–12 win over New Zealand in the World Cup final at Eden Park in Auckland at the end of the 1988 season.

After being given the Raiders' captaincy, Meninga led Canberra to their first premiership in 1989 after overcoming the Balmain Tigers 19–14 in extra time in the Grand Final, the Raiders becoming not only the first non-Sydney team to win the premiership, but also the first team to win after finishing the minor round in 4th place. In the post season Meninga travelled with the Raiders to England and captained the team in their 30–18 loss to a Martin Offiah inspired Widnes in the 1989 World Club Challenge at Old Trafford. Meninga successfully returned to top level representative football in 1989, playing for Queensland in their State of Origin series whitewash of NSW (though he did suffer an eye socket injury in the second game in Sydney which kept him out of the third), before being selected to the mid-season tour of New Zealand. After playing in the centres for the first two test wins over the Kiwis, Meninga was moved to the second-row for the third test in Auckland with great effect as he scored a try and kicked one goal to add to his 5 goals in the first test and 2 in the second.

At the end of the 1990 NSWRL season Meninga led the Raiders to another Grand final victory against the Penrith Panthers. He was also the year's top try-scorer (crossing for five in the Round 5 match against Eastern Suburbs at the Raiders new home ground, Bruce Stadium) and top-point scorer, and was named as Rugby League Week's player of the year. After gaining the test captaincy that year in the absence of an injured Wally Lewis (also because of a broken arm) for the one-off test against France in Parkes and the test against New Zealand in Wellington, Meninga was duly named captain of the 1990 Kangaroos. It was his third Kangaroo Tour after being a member of 1982's "Invincibles", as well as being a member of the undefeated 1986 Kangaroos who became known as "The Unbeatables". Meninga would score the opening try of the Kangaroo Tour in the first game against his old club St Helens at Knowsley Road. After the Kangaroos' shock 19–12 loss in the first Ashes test against Great Britain at Wembley Stadium, Australia won the next two tests at Old Trafford and Elland Road to wrap up the series. In the second test at Old Trafford, Meninga scored one of the most famous tries in test history. With only a couple of minutes remaining and the scores locked at 10 all, his Raiders teammate Ricky Stuart raced through a gap in the tired Lions defence and sprinted 70 metres upfield. With Lions players converging, Meninga loomed in support and after legally shouldering Lions centre Carl Gibson out of the way, received the pass from Stuart and touched down for a dramatic 14–10 win that silenced most of the 46,615 strong crowd. He then went on to score another try in the third and deciding test as Australia won 14–0 and retained The Ashes they had held since 1974. As he also had scored a try at Wembley, Meninga joined legendary Australian winger Ken Irvine (1963), and unlikely try scorer, Queensland and Canberra Prop Sam Backo (1988) as the only Australian's to score a try in each test of an Ashes series. Also in 1990, Meninga's deeds in leading the successful Kangaroo tour saw him named as Britain's BBC Overseas Sports Personality of the Year, the first rugby league player to win it.

Meninga's good form continued in 1991, helping Queensland to win the Origin series (Wally Lewis retained the Qld captaincy) before leading Australia to a 2–1 series win over New Zealand in the mid-season tests. During the 44–12 third test win at Lang Park, Meninga broke Michael Cronin's Kangaroos point scoring record. At the end of the 1991 season after the Raiders had lost 19–12 to Penrith in the Grand Final, Meninga captained the Australians for their tour of Papua New Guinea which included a 2–0 test series win over the Kumuls.

After Canberra's salary cap problems at the end of 1991 which saw them lose a number of fringe players as well as some veterans (though most, including Meninga, agreed to actually take a pay cut in order to keep the side together), the Raiders missed the finals for the first time since 1986 when they finished 12th in 1992.

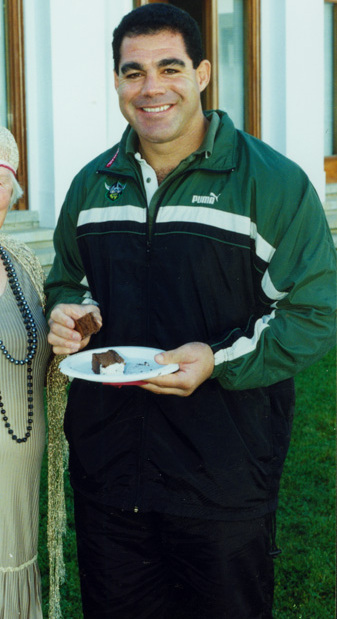
Meninga in 2001

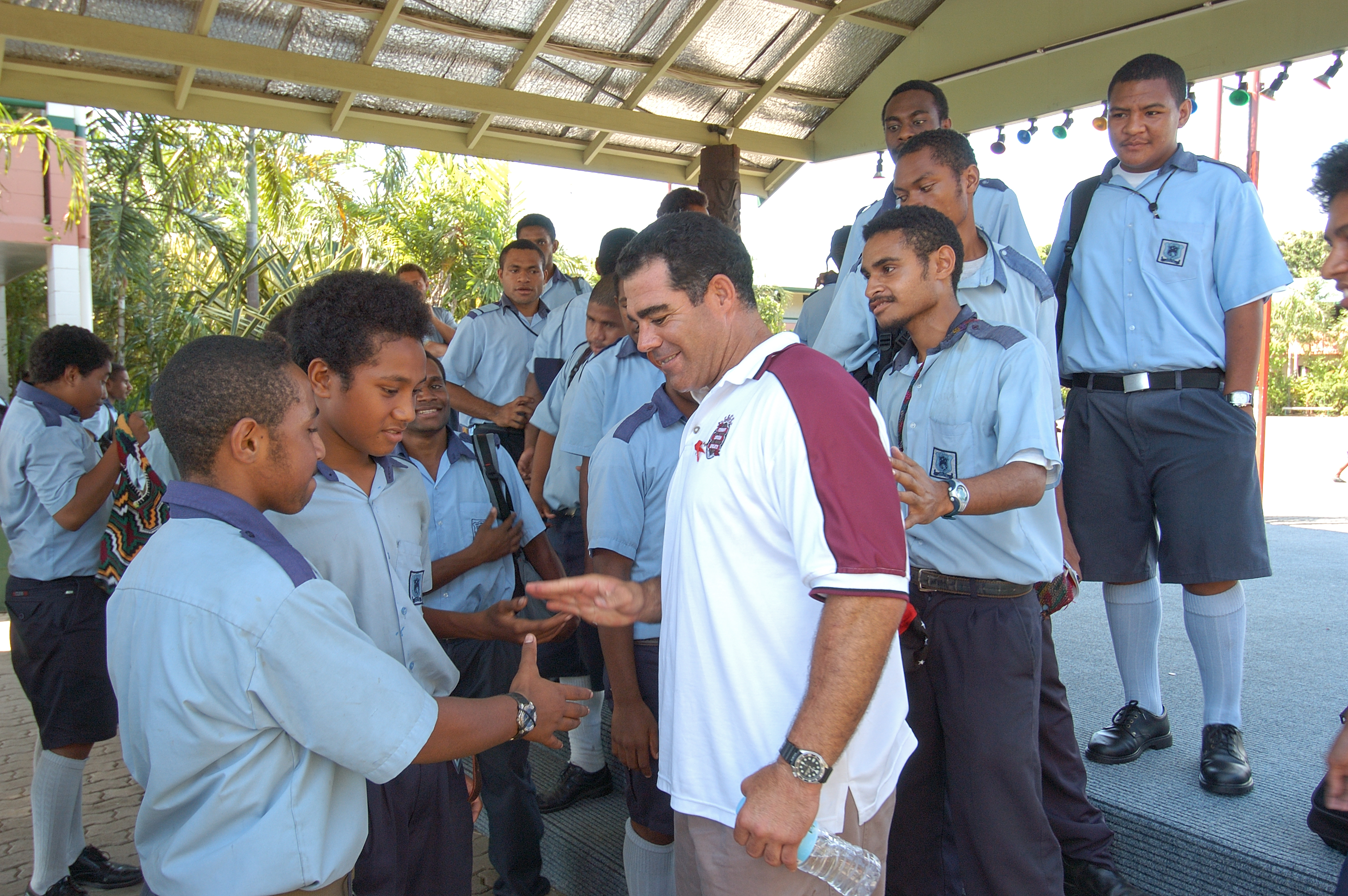
Mal Meninga meeting school students in Papua New Guinea in 2005

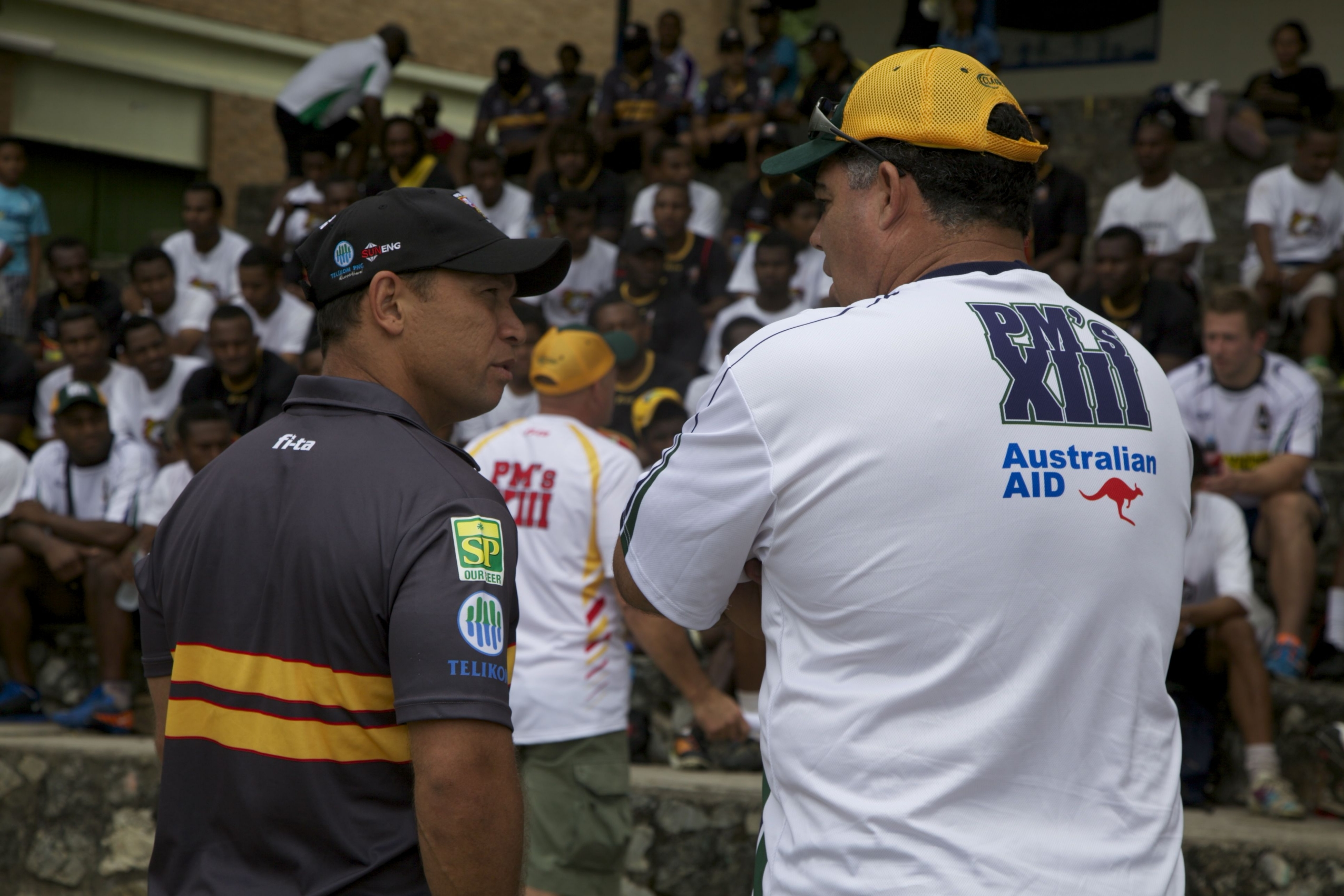
Meninga (right) with Adrian Lam during his tenure as coach of the Prime Minister's XIII in 2012

Meninga's form continued though, captaining Queensland in the 1992 State of Origin series (NSW won 2–1) as well as Australia's successful Ashes defence against the touring Great Britain Lions. He was in great form in the first test at the Sydney Football Stadium, scoring 2 tries as Australia won 22–6. The Lions produced a shock in the second test in Melbourne with a big 33–10 win, but the Kangaroos, led by Meninga's 12 points (1 try, 4 goals) won the deciding test at Lang Park 16–10. By starting in the 3rd test at Lang Park, Meninga played his 37th test, breaking the record of 36 held by Reg Gasnier since 1967. Gasnier was on hand to congratulate Meninga on his achievement. At the end of the 1992 season, Meninga captained Australia to their 10–6 win over Great Britain in the World Cup final in front of a record international test crowd of 73,631 at Wembley Stadium in London.

The Raiders came back strongly in 1993, with their international stars Meninga, Ricky Stuart, Laurie Daley, Bradley Clyde and Steve Walters, as well as try scoring Fijian Noa Nadruku (22 tries for the season) leading the way. Canberra finished third after the minor round, and were premiership favourites until their fateful Round 21 match with the hapless Parramatta Eels at Bruce Stadium. Halfback Ricky Stuart badly broke and dislocated his right ankle in the second half and despite a club record 68–0 win, without their halfback and chief play maker, the Raiders fell apart. They lost their last minor round game to Canterbury-Bankstown 32–8, before meekly going out in straight sets in the finals with losses to eventual Grand Finalists St George and premiers Brisbane. 1993 wasn't all bad though. Although Queensland lost their second straight State of Origin series under Meninga's captaincy, he did lead Australia to a Trans-Tasman Test series win over New Zealand in mid-season. Meninga though was forced to miss the first test at the Mount Smart Stadium in Auckland as he had been suspended for 2 weeks for the use of an elbow to Manly-Warringah's Welsh import centre John Devereux in the Raiders Round 10 match with the Sea Eagles at Brookvale Oval. After the Australians got away with a lucky 14-All draw in the first test, Meninga returned to the team (which was captained by New South Wales captain Laurie Daley in Auckland) for the second test win at Palmerston North on an extremely wet and cold night, as well the third test win at Lang Park.

On Australia Day 1994, Meninga was made a Member of the Order of Australia "for service to rugby league football". Later that year he played his last game for the Canberra Raiders in the 1994 Grand Final where he led his team to victory over Canterbury-Bankstown to their third premiership in six years. Meninga scored the last try of the match after taking an intercept and outpacing Bulldogs centre Jarrod McCracken to score beside the posts (amazingly, despite being a noted goal kicker throughout his career, Meninga declined to take what would have been an easy shot at goal and left it to the team's regular kicker David Furner).

During 1994, Meninga played his final test on Australian soil when he led the Kangaroos to a record 58–0 win over France in a one-off test at Sydney's Parramatta Stadium in front of an almost packed house of 27,318. He scored a try and kicked 5 goals in his final test for Australia in Australia. Unfortunately for Meninga, in his last State of Origin series for Queensland as both captain and as a player, New South Wales, led by Raiders teammate Laurie Daley, won the series 2–1. The State of Origin series is the only trophy Meninga would not win as a team captain. Meninga captained the Raiders to the Grand final for a record fifth time in 1994. At the end of the 1994 season, Meninga was selected for his record fourth Kangaroo Tour and his record second as captain when he went on the 1994 Kangaroo tour. Meninga became the only player selected to four Kangaroo tours and the only player to twice be named tour captain. Australia again lost the first test against Great Britain at Wembley Stadium, but changes made to the team by coach Bob Fulton saw the Kangaroos bounce back with a vengeance in the second test at Old Trafford with a 38–8 win. With the scores locked at 4–4 after two penalty goals each, Meninga intercepted a Bobbie Goulding pass only 20 metres from his own line and raced 70 metres downfield, with flying Lions winger Martin Offiah bearing down on him. Just as Offiah tackled him, Meninga gave a perfectly timed pass to winger Andrew Ettingshausen who scored the first of Australia's seven tries that day. After a poor first test, the second saw a welcome return to form for Meninga. The Kangaroos then scored a hard-fought 23–4 win in the third test at Elland Road to once again retain The Ashes and keep alive their streak of not having lost a test series in England since the 1959–60 Kangaroo tour. On 4 December 1994, at the Stade de la Méditerranée in Béziers, France, Meninga captained Australia to a record 74–0 victory over a very weak French team, scoring the final try of the game, and of his career. In a test career of 46 games for Australia, Meninga scored a total of 278 points (21 tries, 99 goals). Australia won 40 and only lost 6 of the tests Meninga played and did not lose a test series during his time in the green and gold. He played in the centres on 40 occasions for Australia, with one game on the wing, two in the second-row, and three from the bench. On his four Kangaroo Tours as a player, Meninga holds the distinction in playing in every test for Australia on tour, playing all six tests in both 1982 and 1986, all five in 1990, and all four in 1994. Former teammate and coach of the London Broncos, Gary Grienke was hopeful of bringing Meninga to his club for a swansong season, but this did not eventuate.

== Coaching career ==
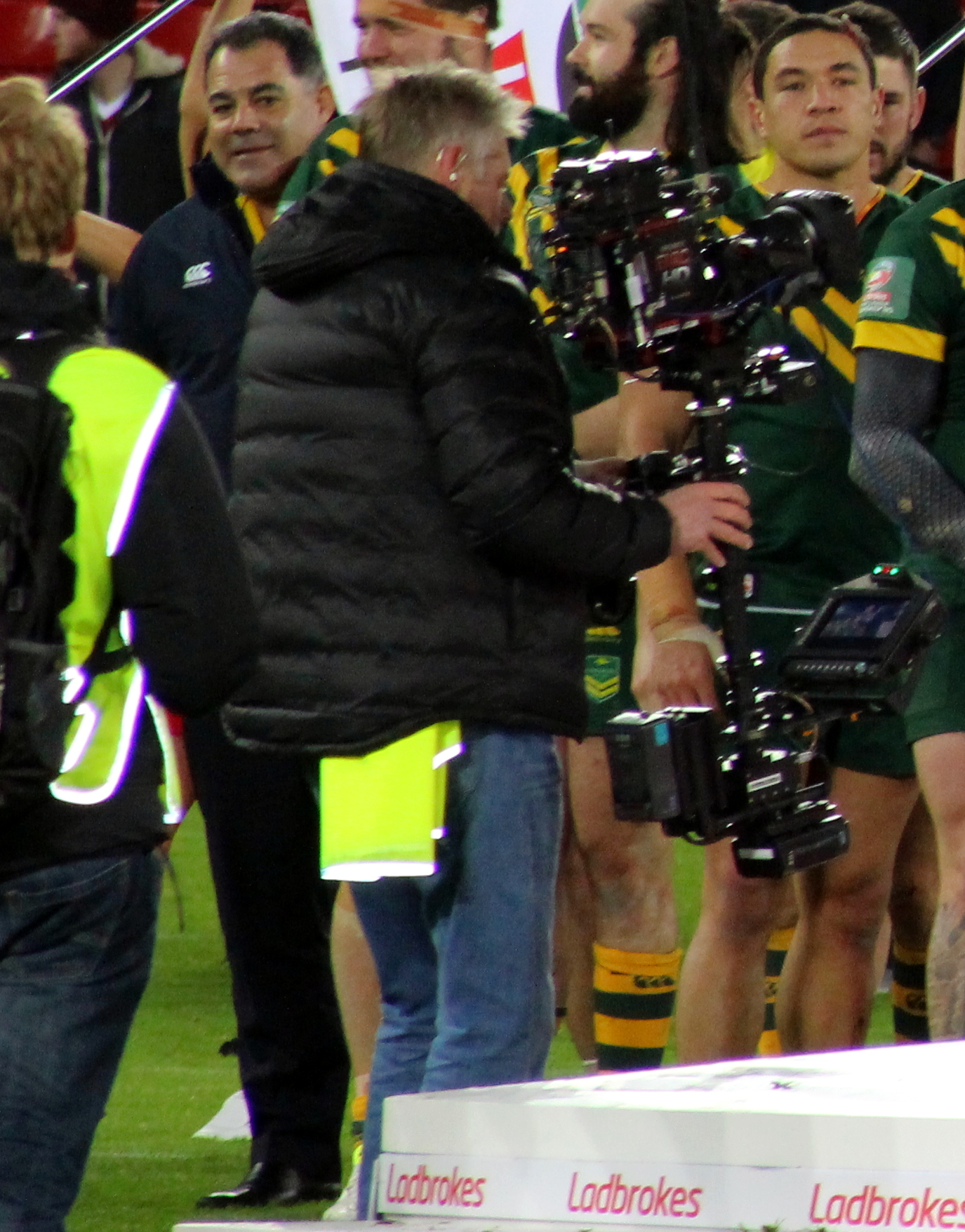
Meninga (left) waiting to collect his medal after the 2016 Four Nations Final

Following his retirement, Meninga openly supported the Super League concept during the Super League war of the mid-1990s. His popularity and playing record as a domestic and international captain were valuable in raising the profile of the rebel competition. In 1995, Meninga's book Mal Meninga: My Life in Football was published. He was appointed head coach of his old club, the Canberra Raiders in Australia's Super League season in 1997.

=== Canberra Raiders ===
Meninga was appointed coach of the Raiders in 1997, succeeding three-time winner Tim Sheens, but achieved only moderate success. In 2000, Meninga was awarded the Australian Sports Medal for his contribution to Australia's international standing in rugby league. The following year, he received the Centenary Medal "for service as a role model and inspiration as a rugby league footballer of the highest standard". After Canberra failed to make the finals of the 2001 NRL season, finishing fourth-last (11th out of 14 teams), Meninga was replaced by Matthew Elliott as Raiders coach.

In late 2002, Meninga expressed interest in the Queensland State of Origin team coaching job.

During the 2003 Rugby Union World Cup, Wales' assistant coach Scott Johnson got Meninga to assist with pre-match preparation by speaking to the players and presenting them with their jerseys.

In late 2005, he was announced as the new Queensland State of Origin coach, to replace Michael Hagan.

=== Prime Minister's XIII ===
From 2005 to 2012, Meninga served as coach of the Australian Prime Minister's XIII. During his tenure, Meninga coached the PM's XIII in 8 matches, winning 7 and drawing 1. He was succeeded as coach of the PM's XIII by New South Wales coach Laurie Daley.

=== Queensland ===
Meninga made a successful début as the Maroons coach in the 2006 State of Origin series, guiding Queensland to a 2–1 series victory, its first outright series victory since 2001 (this despite the fact Queensland lost the first match). Also in 2006, he coached the Prime Minister's XIII side to victory over the Papua New Guinea national rugby league team. Meninga attended the 2007 Challenge Cup Final, in which his old club St Helens was playing, at Wembley Stadium as a guest of honour. On 13 October 2006, Meninga was reappointed as coach of the Maroons for the 2007 State of Origin series and 2008 State of Origin series, both of which Queensland won, taking his record with the Maroons to three wins from three series. When Meninga was given a new contract after the 2008 series, he was quoted as saying: "I want to win six [State of Origin series] in a row". In the 2009 series, Queensland won the first two games giving them a record fourth consecutive series win with captain Darren Lockyer saying Meninga now stands among the legends in State of Origin. In December 2009, Meninga was named coach of the year at the Queensland Sports Awards.

In 2010, Meninga coached Queensland to a fifth straight series win, and is now regarded as the greatest and most successful Origin coach in history. He also coached them to their first "clean sweep" since 2000.

In 2011, Meninga achieved his sixth straight series as coach of Queensland honoring a promise he made in 2008. The weekend after Queensland won its sixth straight series, Meninga penned a column in Brisbane's The Sunday Mail attacking the NSW media and match review panel, and labelling them "rats and filth" after he believed that they [the NSW media] had tried to sabotage his side's attempts at winning their sixth successive series by charging Johnathan Thurston and David Taylor with on-field incidents (only the latter was suspended) and also attacking NSW coach Ricky Stuart over his decision not to reveal the Blues line-up up to one hour before kick-off (which is when the official team lists must be released prior to a match). He was set to face legal action from the NRL's match review panel over his now controversial column, but after negotiations with them on 1 August 2011, the matter was resolved. Meninga still maintains what he has written. For the 2013 State of Origin series New South Wales appointed Laurie Daley to coach against Meninga. This was the third consecutive opponent of Meninga in State of Origin coaching to have been a teammate of the 1990 Winfield Cup Grand Final-winning Canberra side. In 2013, Meninga achieved his eighth consecutive series win with the Queensland State of Origin team.

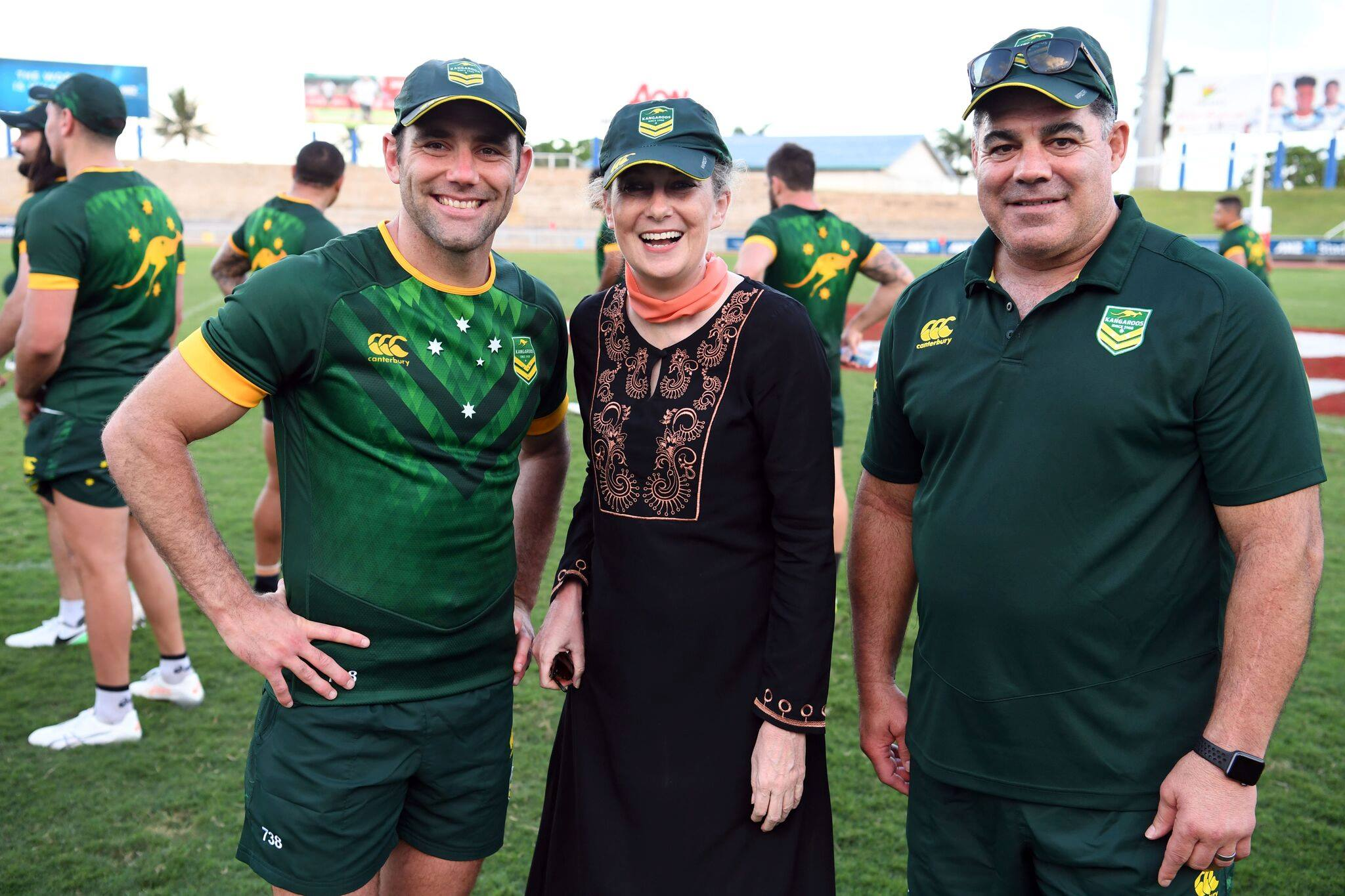
Meninga (right) on duty as the Head Coach of Australia

Meninga's record-breaking winning streak ended with the Blues' win in the 2014 State of Origin series. The Maroons, however, still scored more points than the Blues across all three matches.

In the 2015 State of Origin Series he coached Queensland to their ninth series win in ten years, with the decider played at Suncorp Stadium in Brisbane on 8 July 2015 and Queensland recording both the largest score and biggest victory margin with a 52–6 victory.

=== Australia ===
On 2 December 2015, Meninga was appointed as the head coach of the Australian national rugby league team, succeeding Tim Sheens. This meant that he had to resign as the Queensland Origin coach.

Meninga coached the Australian team to win the 2017 and the (delayed) 2021 Rugby League World Cups.

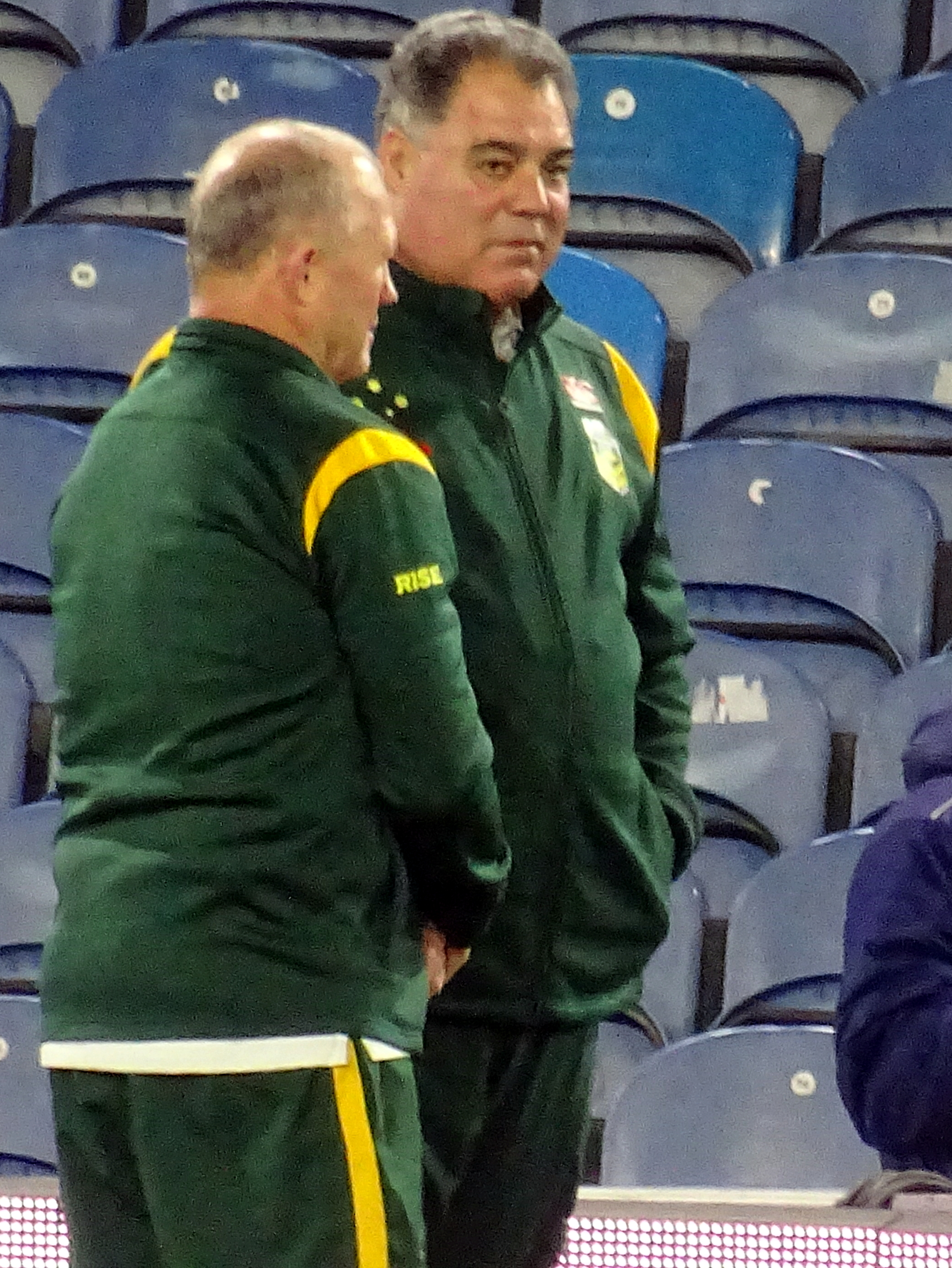
Meninga coaching Australia in 2022

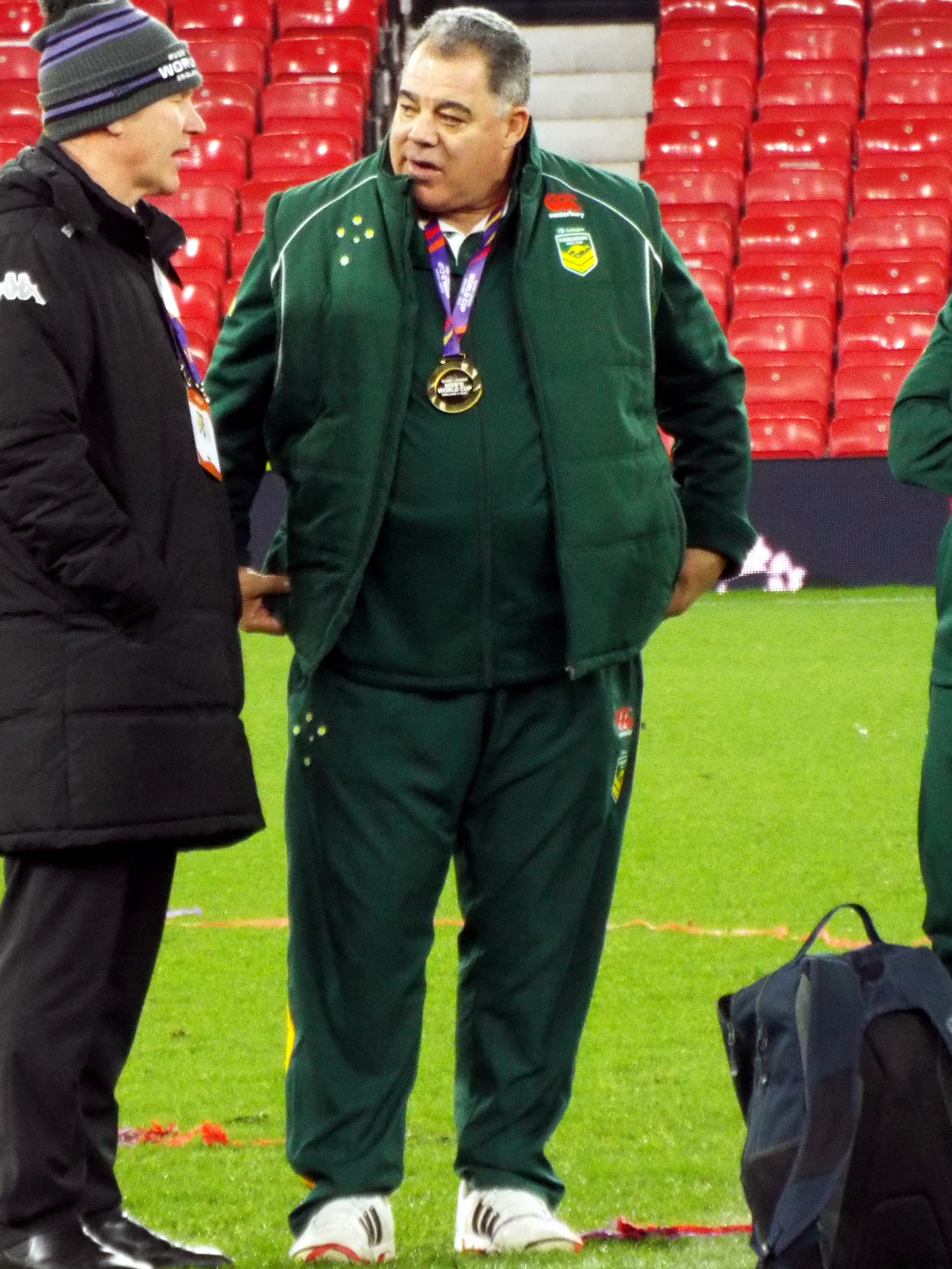
Meninga after winning the 2021 RLWC Final

=== Perth Bears ===
In June 2025, Meninga was named as the inaugural head coach of the Perth Bears for the 2027 and 2028 NRL seasons, with the immediate focus of promoting the club and building the team roster.

==== Anti-tampering breach ====
On 12 June 2026, Meninga and the Perth Bears were fined a combined $40,000 for breaching the NRL's anti-tampering rules. The fine was issued after Meninga made premature media comments regarding the potential recruitment of players contracted to other clubs.

== Political career ==
Meninga briefly campaigned as an Independent for the seat of Molonglo in the Australian Capital Territory Legislative Assembly during the Territory's 2001 general election, informally aligned with the socially conservative, pro-life grouping of Paul Osborne, MLA for Brindabella. On Monday 24 September 2001, after being asked why he was standing, he pulled out mid-sentence, stating, "And the thing about that is, I guess, I was a public figure and I was put on the podium where I was just a person out there ... I'm buggered, I'm sorry, I have to resign."

In 2017, he said that in the six weeks of preparation he had done leading up to the interview, he had not considered how he would respond if asked "why should people vote for you?".

Subsequently, this incident led to the satirical Chaser team instituting the 'Mal Award' for their election television shows, presented to politicians "for the greatest act of political suicide during an election campaign".

Something being 'shorter than Mal Meninga's political career' is sometimes used as an expression in Australian English for a very brief thing, especially in comparison to other political careers. A 'Mal Meninga moment' is another phrase stemming from this event, referring to gaffes where a speaker is unable to answer an obvious question.

== Personal life ==
Meninga has been married twice. His first marriage produced two children, Tamika and Josh. His second marriage, to Amanda, produced three children, two boys and a girl. Meninga also fathered an English daughter during the 1982 Kangaroo tour, meeting her for the first time in 1994.

Mal Meninga's brother Bevan served 21 years in jail for the 1991 murder of Sunshine Coast teenager Cheree Richardson.

== Records ==
- Only player to make four Kangaroo Tours as a player (1982, 1986, 1990 and 1994)
- Only player to twice captain a Kangaroo Tour (1990 and 1994).
- Most points scored in Test matches for Australia (272 – 21 tries, 96 goals) – since surpassed by Johnathan Thurston
- Most goals kicked in Test matches for Australia (96) – since surpassed by Johnathan Thurston
- Most goals kicked in a State of Origin match for Queensland (7 in Game 1 1980) – since surpassed by Johnathan Thurston
- Most State of Origins won as coach in a row. 2006–2013 (8 series)

== Honours ==
Meninga is regarded as an official spokesperson for the South Sea Islander community.

The main grandstand at Canberra Stadium is named the "Mal Meninga Stand" in his honour. The Canberra Raiders' player of the year receives the Mal Meninga Medal in his honour since 2008 and a statue of him has been placed behind the Mal Meninga grandstand next to the one of Laurie Daley.

He was inducted into the Sport Australia Hall of Fame in 1994 and the Australian Rugby League Hall of Fame in 2003.

In February 2008, Meninga was named in the list of Australia's 100 Greatest Players (1908–2007) which was commissioned by the NRL and ARL to celebrate the code's centenary year in Australia. Meninga went on to be named as one of the centres, along with Reg Gasnier, in Australian rugby league's Team of the Century. Announced on 17 April 2008, the team is the panels' majority choice for each of the thirteen starting positions and four interchange players.

In June 2008, he was chosen in the Queensland Rugby League's Team of the Century at centre.

In 2009 as part of the Q150 celebrations, Meninga was announced as one of the Q150 Icons of Queensland for his role as a "sports legend".

In 2016, Meninga was a recipient of the Queensland Greats Awards.

On 1 August 2018, Meninga was announced as one of The Immortals, along with Norm Provan, Frank Burge, Dave Brown and Dally Messenger.

== Playing statistics ==
=== Club ===
†	Denotes seasons in which Meninga won a Premiership in the BRL or NSWRL

Season	Team	Matches	T	G	F/G	Pts
1979	Southern Suburbs	19	9	76	0	179
1980	Southern Suburbs	22	17	97	0	245
1981†	Southern Suburbs	20	14	46	0	134
1982	Southern Suburbs	11	6	26	0	70
1983	Southern Suburbs	10	8	28	0	88
1984	Southern Suburbs	19	18	41	0	154
1984–85	St Helens	31	28	8	0	128
1985†	Southern Suburbs	8	6	0	0	24
1986	Canberra	20	3	65	1	143
1987	Canberra	12	6	34	1	93
1988	Canberra	5	3	7	0	26
1989†	Canberra	16	2	19	0	46
1990†	Canberra	24	17	72	0	212
1991	Canberra	22	13	57	0	166
1992	Canberra	21	6	17	0	58
1993	Canberra	20	11	4	0	52
1994†	Canberra	26	13	8	0	68
Career totals		306	180	605	2	1886 (Note: Tries were only worth three points until 1983.)

== Notes ==
Sporting positions
Preceded by Dean Lance	Captain; Canberra Raiders; 1989–1994	Succeeded by Ricky Stuart
Preceded by Wally Lewis	Captain Australia; 1990–1994	Succeeded by Laurie Daley
