= Steve Ella =

Australia international rugby league footballer

Personal information
- Full name: Stephen John Ella
- Born: 28 July 1960 (age 66) Mount Pritchard, New South Wales, Australia

Playing information
- Position: Centre, Five-eighth, Fullback
Club
Years	Team	Pld	T	G	FG	P
1979–88	Parramatta Eels	153	94	104	6	552
1985–86	Wigan	23	12	0	0	48
1988–89	Wakefield Trinity	20	7	18	2	66
	Total	196	113	122	8	666
Representative
Years	Team	Pld	T	G	FG	P
1982–85	Australia	4	1	0	0	4
1983–85	City Firsts	2	1	0	0	4
1983–85	New South Wales	8	3	0	0	12
1988	Rest of the World	1	0	0	0	0

Stephen John Ella (born 28 July 1960) is an Australian former rugby league footballer who played in the 1970s and 1980s. He was a utility back for the Parramatta Eels, New South Wales and Australia, playing in 4 Tests for Australia between 1983 and 1985. He is a cousin of the Ella brothers who were prominent in Australian rugby union in the 1980s.

== Club career ==
Steve Ella had a ten-year career with Parramatta playing every position in the Eels' backline, though mostly playing at either centre or five-eighth.

Nicknamed the "Zip Zip Man", Ella was a member of Parramatta's star studded backline of the early 1980s, alongside Brett Kenny, Mick Cronin, Peter Sterling and Eric Grothe, Sr. It was only the presence of five-eighth Kenny and the partnership he had with halfback Sterling that saw Ella play most of his first grade games in the centres where alongside Cronin he formed the NSWRL premiership's most lethal pairing.

Ella was a member of four Premiership winning sides at Parramatta in 1981, 1982, 1983 and 1986 and also participated in the 1984 Grand Final loss to Canterbury-Bankstown. Ella scored one try in each of the 1981 and 1982 Grand Final victories over Newtown and Manly-Warringah.

After having scored 79 tries for Parramatta between 1981 and 1985, Ella played in England with Wigan during the 1985–86 season, scoring twelve tries in 23 games. He played stand-off in the 14–8 victory over New Zealand during the 1985 New Zealand rugby league tour of Great Britain and France at Central Park, Wigan on Sunday 6 October 1985, played stand-off, scored two tries, and was man of the match in the 34–8 victory over Warrington in the 1985 Lancashire Cup Final during the 1985–86 season at Knowsley Road, St. Helens, on Sunday 13 October 1985, and played stand-off in the 18–4 victory over Hull Kingston Rovers in the 1985–86 John Player Special Trophy Final during the 1985–86 season at Elland Road, Leeds on Saturday 11 January 1986.

When Ella returned to Parramatta early in the 1986 season, his career took a downturn that began when he suffered a gashed hand in early May, and then a shoulder injury in the Panasonic Cup semi-final against Manly. This shoulder injury recurred in June and again after Ella played two more games in July. After an arthroscope revealed ligament damage in Ella's shoulder, he missed five more games but an intensive course in physiotherapy allowed him to return and participate in a fourth premiership team before a full-scale off-season surgery. However, in his second match of 1987 Ella slipped his shoulder and missed the rest of the season after a series of shoulder issues. There would be an arthroscopy in March featuring the removal of loose bone fragments, and a second full-scale surgery at the end of May. Steve Ella would return for the 1988 season and escape injuries, producing several very good displays for a struggling Parramatta team. Steve Ella finished his career in 1989 as captain of Wakefield Trinity in 1988–89. Ella did return to Parramatta for the 1989 season, but did not play a single game due to injury. After a specialist advised him not to risk further damage to his shoulder, Ella announced his retirement in July two weeks shy of his twenty-ninth birthday.

=== First grade matches ===
Team	Matches	Years
Parramatta	156	1979-88
Wigan	23	1985-86
Wakefield	20	1989
City Firsts	2	1983, 1985
New South Wales	8	1982-85
Australia	4	1982-85
Rest of the World	1	1988

==== Club records and statistics ====
Ella scored 544 career points for Parramatta in 156 first grade premiership games putting him in third place on the club's all-time points list. In 1982 he was the season's top try-scorer and also set the club record with a total of 23 tries in a season, until Semi Radradra scored a total of 24 tries in the 2015 season thus breaking the record. He scored 92 career tries for Parramatta placing him in fourth place on the club's all time tryscoring table behind Jarryd Hayne, Brett Kenny and Luke Burt.

== Representative career ==
Steve Ella made seven State of Origin appearances for New South Wales between 1983 and 1985.

He was first selected for the Blues in Game 1 of the 1983 State of Origin series at Lang Park in Brisbane. After originally being named in the starting side, at the last moment Blues coach Ted Glossop decided to start veteran Manly-Warringah pivot Alan Thompson instead and play Ella from the bench. The late change didn't work and after a poor game from Thompson, Ella came on in the second half and scored a try to give NSW a chance at victory, though Queensland went on to win the game 24–12. He was then selected in the centres alongside Mick Cronin for Game 2 at the Sydney Cricket Ground where he scored a try in the Blues' 10–6 triumph in muddy conditions for their sole win of the series. That game was notable because other than fullback Marty Gurr from Eastern Suburbs, the entire NSW backline consisted of Parramatta players (Grothe and Hunt on the wings, Ella and Cronin in the centres and Kenny and Sterling the halves). The NSW side that night was captained by Parramatta captain Ray Price while Eels forward Stan Jurd was on the bench. He retained his place in the side for Game 3 of the series in Brisbane, though Qld, led by their captain and Test 5/8 Wally Lewis outclassed NSW 43—22 after leading by 33—0 midway through the second half.

Ella then played Games 1 and 3 of 1984 and in all three games of 1985 when the Blues eventually had a series triumph over Queensland.

At the national level, he was selected for the 1982 Kangaroo tour of Great Britain and France and appeared in twelve minor games, though he didn't play a Test on tour. In the tour match against Wales in Cardiff, Ella scored four tries equaling the record for an Australian in a full international. On that same tour in a game in France against Aquitaine in Villeneuve he scored seven tries equaling a record set by Cec Blinkhorn in the 1920s.

Steve Ella made his Test début for Australia against New Zealand in the Second Test of 1983 at Lang Park. After missing the 1984 Ashes Series against the touring Great Britain Lions, he made his return to the test team for the three test 1985 Trans-Tasman series against New Zealand. This would prove to be the last occasion when Ella represented Australia.

Ella also made two appearances for NSW City. He made his first appearance for City in 1983, playing 5/8 and scoring a try in their 30–14 win over NSW Country in Newcastle. His last appearance, also in Newcastle, came in City's 18–12 win in 1985 with Ella again playing five-eighth.

Competition App T G FG Pts W L D Win % NRL NRL 157 93 104 6 548 106 50 1 67.52% NRL Finals 19 7 ‑ ‑ 25 14 5 0 73.68% Australia 13 22 3 ‑ 72 13 0 0 100.00%

Ella is the District Director of the Aboriginal Health Unit in the Central Coast Local Health District.

== Sources ==
- Andrews, Malcolm (2006) The ABC of Rugby League Austn Broadcasting Corpn, Sydney
- NRL Official 2007 Season Guide, News Magazines Surry Hills Sydney, for the National Rugby League
