= 1987 State of Origin series =

Australian rugby league series

- Won by: Queensland (4th series title)
- Series margin: 2-1
- Points scored: 72
- Attendance: 109,091 (ave. 36,364 per match)
- Top points scorer(s): Michael O'Connor; Dale Shearer (14 points each)
- Top try scorer(s): Dale Shearer (3 tries)

The 1987 State of Origin series saw the sixth time the annual three-match series between the New South Wales and Queensland representative rugby league football teams was contested entirely under 'State of Origin' selection rules. It saw the emergence of new faces who would go on to become Origin legends (Queensland's Allan Langer and New South Wales' Andrew Ettingshausen), record crowds for all three matches, and an additional exhibition game played in Long Beach, California (near Los Angeles).

The 1987 series was also the last in which players for Queensland were selected from teams of the Brisbane Rugby League premiership. Whilst BRL players technically remained eligible for selection, the introduction of the Brisbane Broncos and Gold Coast-Tweed Giants to the New South Wales Rugby League premiership in 1988 meant that, after this series, all players in State of Origin would henceforth be sourced from NSWRL teams. The final eight BRL players selected for Queensland were captain Wally Lewis, Gene Miles, Colin Scott, Greg Dowling and Bryan Niebling (all Wynnum Manly Seagulls), Greg Conescu (Redcliffe Dolphins) and Allan Langer (Ipswich Jets), all of whom joined the Brisbane Broncos for their inaugural season, and Gary Smith (Brothers) who moved to the North Sydney Bears.

== Games ==
=== Game I ===
Mark Murray had missed just one Origin clash in the first five series but when he suffered a serious eye injury that forced his premature retirement in the off-season of 1986, it was widely expected that in-form Eastern Suburbs half-back Laurie Spina would be called into the side after good form for the Roosters and impressing in a Qld selection trial at Lang Park. Instead, and against the wishes of coach Wayne Bennett, the Maroons selectors opted for the jockey-sized Ipswich Jets half-back Allan Langer then just 68 kg and a month shy of his 21st birthday. Spina would never again get the chance to represent Queensland.

Tuesday, June 2, 1987

New South Wales	20–16	Queensland
(12 - 2 t, 2 g) Michael O'Connor (4 - 1 t) Mark McGaw (4 - 1 t) Les Davidson	(Report)	Dale Shearer(4 - 1 t); Tony Currie(4 - 1 t); Greg Dowling (4 - 1 t); Gary Belcher (2 - 1 g); Peter Jackson (2 - 1 g)

Lang Park
Attendance: 33,441
Referee: Mick Stone
Player of the Match: Les Davidson

In his first match at Origin level, Langer proved he was a worthy partner for Wally Lewis in the halves and silenced his doubters with a performance that went close to earning him the man-of-the-match award which was won by Blues' second rower Les Davidson.

With only minutes left in the game the scores were locked at 16-all and heading for the first drawn result when referee Mick Stone made one of the most controversial refereeing decisions in Origin history, awarding the winning try to Mark McGaw. New South Wales' half-back Peter Sterling missed with a field-goal attempt before launching a final backline raid down the right hand side of the field. Cronulla Sharks centre Andrew Ettingshausen, on debut and playing on the wing, sent his club team-mate Mark McGaw away on a long burst down the sideline. Cornered by the converging defence, McGaw threw an inside pass that was knocked down by Queensland but was kicked ahead into the Maroons' in-goal. In a flurry of action that saw arms, legs and bodies flailing in desperation, a hand reached out and grounded the ball just before it skidded dead.

Referee Stone was forced to make a split second pivotal decision without the help of the video referee backup of today's game. Stone ruled that McGaw had touched down centimetres inside the dead-ball line for a try, despite the protests of the Qld players and the 33,000 strong Lang Park crowd yelling for him to call in their favour and prevent the Maroons from losing their 7th game from the past 8 contests. While video replays ultimately proved inconclusive, leaving the decision a controversial one still debated among many today, Stone was adamant that the try had been scored and later confirmed that had there not been a try scored, he would have awarded a penalty try to NSW in any case as Qld centre Peter Jackson had attempted to hold back McGaw by grabbing his jumper.

=== Game II ===
Tuesday, June 16, 1987

Queensland	12–6	New South Wales
(4 - 1 t) Dale Shearer (4 - 1 t) Greg Dowling (4 - 1 t) Colin Scott	(Report)	Andrew Farrar(4 - 1 t); Michael O'Connor (2 - 1 g)

Sydney Cricket Ground
Attendance: 42,048
Referee: Barry Gomersall
Player of the Match: Peter Sterling

Game II at the Sydney Cricket Ground in front of a record Origin crowd of 42,048 was played in torrential rain. The powerful kicking of Lewis and fullback Gary Belcher was superior to the Blues' who were forced to play much of the match in their own half. Queensland capitalised on New South Wales' errors to emerge with a 12-6 victory. On his 27th birthday, Peter Sterling earned the man-of-the-match award, a rare honour for a player on the losing side.

Before the game, and despite Queensland having won Origin from 1980–84, as New South Wales had won the 1985 and 1986 series and 7 of the previous 8 games going into game 2 (dating back to Game 3 in 1984), and with the addition of the Brisbane Broncos and Gold Coast Seagulls into the Sydney premiership in 1988, some in the Sydney press were wondering about the future of Origin with the general feeling being that the Blues were set to embark on another period of domination like the one that had brought about the Origin concept in the first place. Queensland's gutsy win under pressure and in adverse conditions silenced the critics.

=== Game III ===
Wednesday, July 15, 1987

Queensland	10–8	New South Wales
(6 - 1 t, 1 g) Dale Shearer (4 - 1 t) Bob Lindner	(Report)	David Boyle (4 - 1 t); Michael O'Connor (4 - 2 g)

Lang Park
Attendance: 33,602
Referee: Barry Gomersall
Player of the Match: Allan Langer

The series decider at Lang Park was a memorable, closely contested State of Origin match, with play moving from end to end. Queensland scored two well-worked tries to take an 10–8 lead into halftime, then held off New South Wales in a tense second half in which neither side managed to score. In the 39th minute, referee Barry Gomersall ruled New South Wales centre Michael O'Connor offside after a kick by Cliff Lyons, although television replays suggested the decision was marginal. Queensland winger Dale Shearer converted the resulting penalty, securing a two-point victory for the Maroons and the Series. Langer was a triumphant figure for Queensland and in his third Origin game was named 'man of the match' after playing the game of his life.

=== California Game IV ===
Later in the season a match was played at Long Beach, California. The game did not count toward the series, but the match retained State of Origin status and is included in the records and player appearance calculations.

The game was billed as an historic occasion for the game of Rugby League and an opportunity for rugby league to grab a foothold in the United States.
It was a bold endeavour, but ultimately the match failed to create a lasting impression on America's sporting consciousness. There was minimal press coverage of the game and disputes over the size of the crowd, with many tickets reportedly given away.

Thursday, August 6, 1987

New South Wales	30–18	Queensland
(4 - 1 t) Andrew Ettingshausen (4 - 1 t) Mark McGaw (4 - 1 t) Jonathan Docking (14 - 1t, 5 g)Michael O'Connor (4 - 1 t) Cliff Lyons	(Report)	Tony Currie (4 - 1 t); Gene Miles (4 - 1 t); Dale Shearer (10 - 1 t, 3g)

Veterans Memorial Stadium, Long Beach, California, United States
Attendance: 12,349
Referee: Mick Stone
Player of the Match: Peter Sterling

== Teams ==
=== New South Wales ===
Position	Game 1	Game 2	Game 3	Exhibition*
Fullback	Garry Jack			Jonathan Docking
Wing	Michael O'Connor		Brian Johnston	
Centre	Mark McGaw		Brett Kenny	Mark McGaw
Centre	Brian Johnston		Michael O'Connor	
Wing	Andrew Ettingshausen	Andrew Farrar	Andrew Ettingshausen	
Five-Eighth	Brett Kenny		Cliff Lyons	
Halfback	Peter Sterling			Peter Sterling (c)
Prop	Les Davidson	David Boyle	Peter Tunks	
Hooker	Royce Simmons			
Prop	Pat Jarvis		Phil Daley	
Second Row	Steve Folkes		David Boyle	Noel Cleal
Second Row	Noel Cleal	Les Davidson		
Lock	Wayne Pearce (c)			Paul Langmack
Replacement	Des Hasler		Mark McGaw	Des Hasler
Replacement	David Boyle	Paul Langmack	Steve Folkes	David Boyle
Coach	Ron Willey			

=== Queensland ===
Position	Game 1	Game 2	Game 3	Exhibition*
Fullback	Gary Belcher			
Wing	Tony Currie	Colin Scott		Tony Currie
Centre	Peter Jackson			
Centre	Gene Miles			
Wing	Dale Shearer			
Five-Eighth	Wally Lewis (c)			
Halfback	Allan Langer			
Prop	Greg Dowling			
Hooker	Greg Conescu			
Prop	Martin Bella		Bryan Niebling	
Second Row	Trevor Gillmeister			
Second Row	Paul Vautin			
Lock	Ian French	Bob Lindner		
Replacement	Colin Scott	Tony Currie		Colin Scott
Replacement	Gary Smith	Ian French		
Coach	Wayne Bennett			

== Sources ==
- Big League's 25 Years of Origin Collectors' Edition, News Magazines, Surry Hills, Sydney
