= Wally Lewis =

Australia international rugby league footballer and coach (born 1959)

Wally Lewis AM
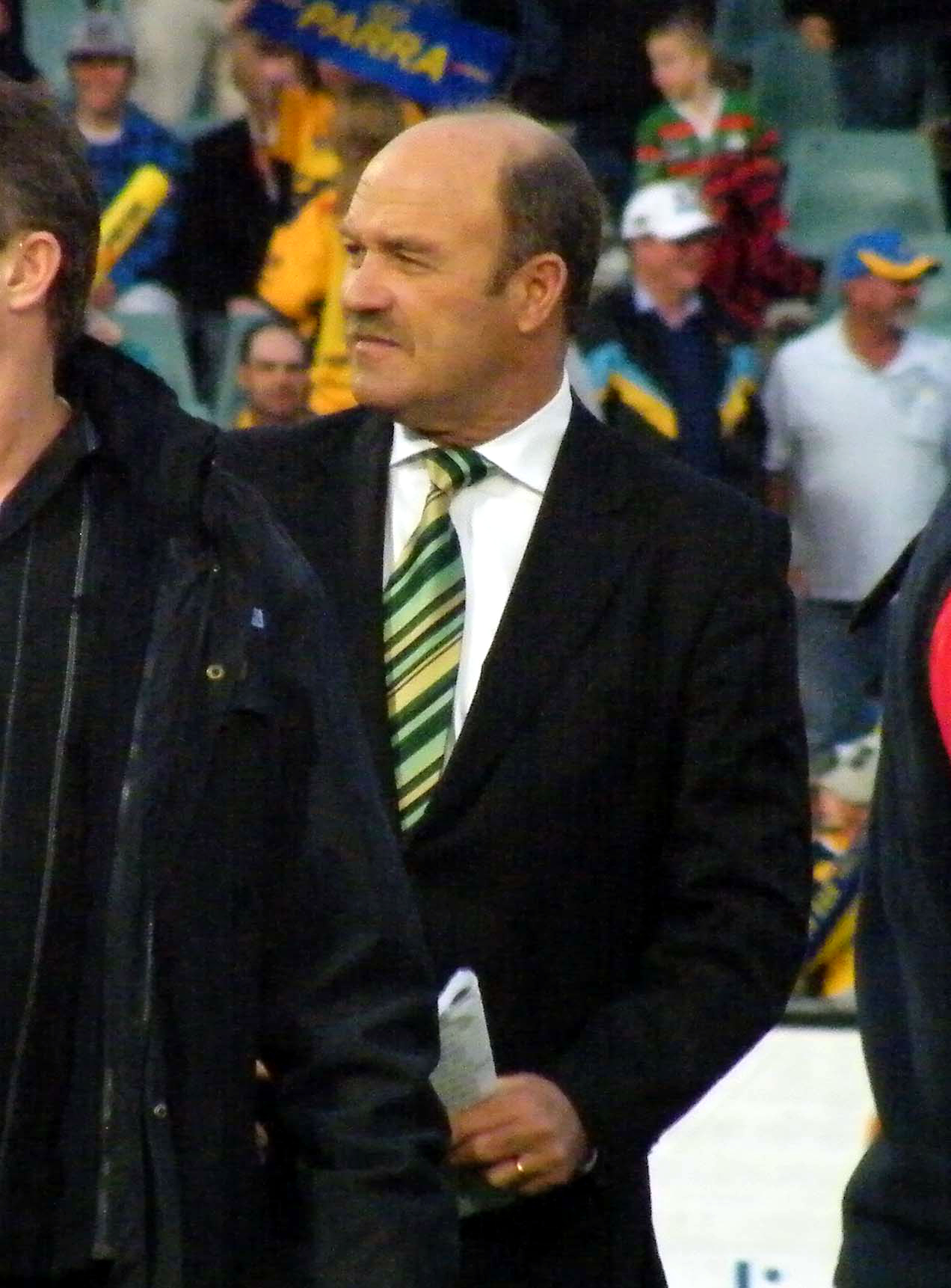
- Lewis in 2009

Personal information
- Full name: Walter James Lewis
- Born: 1 December 1959 (age 66) Hawthorne, Queensland, Australia

Playing information
- Height: 182 cm (6 ft 0 in)
- Weight: 95 kg (14 st 13 lb)
- Position: Five-eighth, Lock
Club
Years	Team	Pld	T	G	FG	P
1978–83	Fortitude Valley	111	71	11	4	249
1983–84	Wakefield Trinity	10	6	0	0	24
1984–87	Wynnum-Manly	55	26	9	2	124
1988–90	Brisbane Broncos	46	20	11	0	102
1991–92	Gold Coast Seagulls	34	6	3	0	30
	Total	256	129	34	6	529
Representative
Years	Team	Pld	T	G	FG	P
1979–87	Brisbane		5	5	0	27
1980–91	Queensland	38	7	1	2	30
1981	South Queensland	1	1	1	0	5
1981–91	Australia	34	11	0	2	45

Coaching information
Club
Years	Team	Gms	W	D	L	W%
1986–87	Wynnum-Manly	32	25	1	7	78
1992–93	Gold Coast Seagulls	44	7	1	36	16
	Total	76	32	2	43	42
Representative
Years	Team	Gms	W	D	L	W%
1993–94	Queensland	6	2	0	4	33

Walter James Lewis AM (born 1 December 1959) is an Australian former professional rugby league footballer who played in the 1970s, 1980s and 1990s, and coached in the 1980s and 1990s. He became a commentator for television coverage of the sport. A highly decorated Australian national captain, Lewis is widely regarded as one of the greatest ever players of rugby league. His time as a player and coach was followed by a career as a sports presenter for the Nine Network.

Nicknamed The King and also The Emperor of Lang Park, Lewis represented Queensland in thirty-one State of Origin games from 1980 to 1991, and was captain for thirty of them. He also represented Australia in thirty-three international matches from 1981 to 1991 and was national team captain from 1984 to 1989. Lewis is perhaps best known for his State of Origin performances, spearheading Queensland's dominance in that competition throughout the 1980s and winning a record 8 man of the match awards.

Lewis has since been inducted into the Australian Rugby League Hall of Fame and in 1999 he became the sixth member of 'The Immortals'. In 2000, he was awarded the Australian Sports Medal for his contribution to Australia's international standing in the sport of rugby league.

In February 2008, Lewis was named in the list of Australia's 100 Greatest Players (1908–2007) which was commissioned by the NRL and ARL to celebrate the code's centenary year in Australia. Lewis went on to be named in the halves in the Kangaroos' Team of the Century. Announced on 17 April 2008, the team is the panel's majority choice for each of the thirteen starting positions and four interchange players. In June 2008, he was also chosen in the Queensland Rugby League's Team of the Century at five-eighth and captain. In October 2016, he became the 38th Legend of Australian Sport at the Sport Australia Hall of Fame awards.

In 2009 as part of the Q150 celebrations, Wally Lewis was announced as one of the Q150 Icons of Queensland for his role as a "sports legend".

In 2011, Lewis was a recipient of the Queensland Greats Awards.

== Early life ==
Lewis was born in Hawthorne, Queensland on 1 December 1959. His father, Jimmy, played first grade rugby league at wing or fullback for Brisbane clubs Wests and Souths, later becoming coach of the Wynnum-Manly club. His mother, June, was a Queensland representative netball player. When he was six years old, Lewis was playing rugby league with Cannon Hill Stars, usually at lock forward. He played in junior Queensland school teams, at times representing his state against New South Wales before a State or Test match at the Sydney Cricket Ground.

Lewis attended Brisbane State High School during the 1970s. In 1977 while still in high school, Lewis also played representative rugby union as a Centre, touring Europe and Japan with the Australian schoolboys team alongside the likes of Tony Melrose, Michael O'Connor, and all three Ella brothers Mark, Glen and Gary, all of whom went on to represent the Australia national rugby union team, while O'Connor would become a dual international when he played alongside Lewis for the Kangaroos.

The 1977 Australian Schoolboys Rugby Union tour of Great Britain would see the first of three times Lewis would make undefeated tours of Britain with Australian national teams.

According to Lincoln Lewis, Wally and his brother Scott, who played alongside him in the BRL, are butchers by trade.

== Rugby League career ==
=== Fortitude Valley ===
Following his return to Australia from the 1977 Schoolboys tour, Lewis faced discrimination in the Queensland Rugby Union fraternity due to his rugby league background. After being told he would no longer be selected for any representative teams if he continued to play league, he immediately decided his future lay with rugby league, playing in the Brisbane Rugby League premiership with Valleys Diehards from 1978. Also in 1978, Lewis (and another young Brisbane based lock from Wests named Paul Vautin) turned down an offer to play in the Sydney premiership with the North Sydney Bears.

While Lewis would remain for the 1979 Brisbane Rugby League season, Vautin would go on to sign with 1978 Sydney premiers the Manly-Warringah Sea Eagles. In 1979 Lewis made his senior début for Queensland from the bench in games played under the old State of Residence rules, and also during the 1979 Great Britain Lions tour, was selected to play for the Maroons as well as a Brisbane rugby league team against the touring Great Britain Lions. With former Australian halfback Ross Strudwick now captain-coach of the Diehards, Lewis helped Valleys to premiership victory over the Wayne Bennett-coached Souths Magpies side in the BRL Grand Final at Lang Park. Playing in the centres for the Magpies that day was a 19-year-old cadet policeman who would become a long serving Queensland and Australian teammate of Lewis in the coming decade, Mal Meninga.

Lewis made the run-on side for Queensland in the inaugural State of Origin match in 1980 at lock forward alongside his hero Arthur Beetson who at the age of 35 was playing in his first ever game for his home state. There were some in the press who questioned his selection, claiming he should have started from the bench with well performed Brisbane Wests lock Norm Carr in the starting side. Lewis however had a hand in Queensland's first ever State of Origin try scored by Kerry Boustead. The following year a second State of Origin match was played, and captain-coach Arthur Beetson was a late withdrawal due to injury. In what proved to be a master stroke, Beetson coached the team from the sidelines and handed the captaincy over to 21-year-old Lewis who had moved from lock to play Five-eighth.

His form for Queensland in both the two games played under the old residence system, and the one Origin game in which he scored one of four Qld tries, saw him selected to make his Test début for Australia in 1981, playing five-eighth in a 43–3 win over France at the SCG. At the Australian team's first training session (at Lang Park), coach Frank Stanton wasn't impressed with Lewis' fitness after he lagged behind in a set of 400 metre runs, though it was reported that Lewis wasn't alone and only lock forward Ray Price had completed the runs without too much trouble. During the game Lewis had a chance to score his first test try. Backing up a line break, Lewis received the ball only 15 metres out with a clear path to the line. Hearing someone closing in from behind he passed the ball to his Halfback partner Steve Mortimer to score before he could be tackled. After scoring Mortimer questioned Lewis as to why he passed as there was no French player near him. Lewis later saw a television replay which showed it was in fact the match referee who he could hear behind him. Ironically, the try was Mortimer's first test try in what was also his début test for Australia.

In the 1982 State of Origin series Lewis got his second Origin try and his first man-of-the-match award in Origin and later that year was a member of the 1982 Kangaroo tour as tour vice-captain. The 1982 Kangaroos became the first side to go through Great Britain and France undefeated, earning themselves the nickname The Invincibles. The tour raged with selection controversy as for the opening game of the tour against Hull Kingston Rovers, Stanton chose Parramatta's Winfield Cup Grand Final winning halves Brett Kenny and Peter Sterling (though Lewis actually played from the bench), who went about cementing their selection for the first test. Lewis was left out of the first Ashes test against Great Britain at Boothferry Park in Hull and coach Frank Stanton had been less than impressed with his attitude to training and his off-field habits which had seen him actually gain weight. Stanton then challenged him to get back into shape and force his way back into the test team and Lewis did just that. He began training harder to lose the weight, including jogging back from training to the team base, the Dragonara Hotel in Leeds. His form also improved and he became a vital player from the bench in the final two tests at Central Park and Headingley. Lewis' finest moment on the tour came in the second half of the second test in Wigan. After coming on as a replacement for injured winger Eric Grothe (he come on to play 5/8 with Brett Kenny moving to the centres and Mal Meninga to the wing), Lewis fired a bullet-like 20 metre cut-out pass to Meninga who then scored in the corner. Although the Kangaroos had soundly beaten Great Britain until that point of the series, Lewis' pass had a psychological effect on the Lions who were left wondering just how good the Australian's really were if they could afford to leave someone on the bench who could pass like that. Those long cut-out passes (something he learned playing junior rugby union and playing backyard football with his brothers) would become a feature of Lewis' game over the next 10 years.

During the tour, Lewis captained his first game for Australia in an international when the Kangaroos defeated Wales in a "non-test" at Ninian Park in Cardiff. Playing in the Centres, Lewis was one of four try scorers in a 37–7 win for the Kangaroos, with fullback Steve Ella leading the way with four. Wally also kicked four goals with the game played in driving rain.

Wally was selected at five-eighth for the first test against France on the French leg of the tour, but missed the second test after again dislocating his shoulder in a minor game between the tests which ended his tour as a player.

In the first and third games of the 1983 State of Origin series, Lewis was named man-of-the-match. In 1983, Lewis also regained his test five-eighth spot from Brett Kenny for the two tests against New Zealand at Carlaw Park in Auckland, and at Lang Park.

Lewis captained Queensland as they toured Papua New Guinea and England part of the 1983–84 Rugby Football League season. He played in their 8–6 defeat against Hull Kingston Rovers followed up by a 40–2 victory over Wigan RLFC and a 2–58 win over Leeds Rhinos.

Lewis played for English First Division side Wakefield Trinity for a short spell during the 1983–84 Rugby Football League season and he remains a favourite of Trinity fans, who named their fanzine Wally Lewis is Coming. Trinity won 5 of 10 games during Lewis's stay, including a win over St. Helens in which Lewis scored a hat-trick. After his last match on 12 February, Trinity did not win another game and were relegated to the second division. Initially, Lewis had been reluctant to sign with Wakefield after having played both club and representative football almost non-stop since the start of 1982, including the Kangaroo Tour and Queensland's three game tour of England at the end of 1983, when he came to the attention of Wakefield. The club asked him to name his price and, not believing that they could afford it, Lewis told them it would cost £30,000 for him to play in England (based on increases in average earnings, this would be approximately £140,100 in 2016). What he did not know was that a wealthy Wakefield businessman financially supported the club and was bankrolling their attempt to sign Lewis (who by the end of 1983 had been rated the best player in rugby league). Good to his word and despite being jaded and in need of a break, Lewis signed to play his only season of English club football and became the highest paid player in England at the time.

=== Wynnum-Manly ===
Back in Australia, Lewis left Valleys and ultimately signed with the Wynnum-Manly Seagulls after initially considering an offer from Past Brothers. In 1984 Lewis captained an Oceania team's 54–4 victory over an Anglo-French selection in an exhibition match Paris, returning to Brisbane after the match to continue playing for Wynnum-Manly. He gained the national captaincy for the first time in the 1984 Ashes series against Great Britain, winning a well publicised battle with Parramatta and NSW captain Ray Price and becoming the 12th Queenslander to captain Australia. Lewis was the first Queenslander to captain an Australian team to an Ashes victory. Wally was also named player of the series for his performance as captain of the Brisbane Rugby League team that won the 1984 National Panasonic Cup Final against Sydney's Eastern Suburbs Roosters club. Lewis was named man-of-the match in the first two games of the 1984 State of Origin series, making it three consecutive Origin man-of-the-match awards. That year, he also won the Brisbane Rugby League premiership's grand final against Souths. The following year, Lewis was awarded the inaugural Golden Boot Award as the world's best international player in 1984.

Lewis was man-of-the-match for Game II of the 1985 State of Origin series, becoming the second player, after Mal Meninga in Game 1 1982, from the losing team to win the award. He then played in Wynnum-Manly's 1985 BRL grand final loss to a Souths Magpies team which included Gary Belcher, Mal Meninga and Peter Jackson. The Australian side toured New Zealand that year, winning the test series 2–1. The New Zealand tour was an unhappy one though, with coach Terry Fearnley, who had just led New South Wales to their first ever State of Origin series win, not getting along with captain Lewis or the other Queensland players and seemingly favoring NSW players, especially tour vice-captain Wayne Pearce. After winning the first two tests, Fearnley dropped four players from the team, all Queenslanders, in what Queensland Rugby League boss Senator Ron McAuliffe called a "Football Assassination". The changes to the team proved to be a disaster as the Kiwis defeated a disjointed Australia 18–0.

The following year, internal problems between the Seagulls club board and its head coach Des Morris saw Lewis installed as Captain-coach of Wynnum-Manly. Lewis would lead the team, which included rep players Colin Scott, Gene Miles and Bob Lindner, to a 14–6 win over Brothers in the 1986 BRL Grand Final at Lang Park. He then became the first Queenslander since Tom Gorman in 1929–30 to be named as captain for a Kangaroo tour. Following the successful 1986 Kangaroo tour which the Australians went through undefeated to earn themselves the nickname The Unbeatables, 1985 Australian coach Terry Fearnley wrote an article for Rugby League Week that was highly critical of Lewis' captaincy based on his experiences during the 1985 New Zealand tour. Don Furner, who took over as Australian coach in 1986 before the mid-season test series against New Zealand, later told that while initially weary of working with Lewis based on Fearnley's public comments and Lewis' battles with Frank Stanton on the 1982 Kangaroo Tour, he encountered no problems with the Australian captain and the two formed a good personal and working relationship.

Although Queensland lost the 1986 State of Origin series 3–0 to NSW, the first clean sweep in Origin history, Lewis led the Australian's to a clean sweep of New Zealand in the mid-season test series, scoring a try in the 29-12 second test win at the SCG and the 32–12 win in the final game at Lang Park. Australia also won the opening test of the series 22–8 at Carlaw Park in Auckland.

In 1987 Lewis was honoured as a Member of the Order of Australia "for service to rugby league football". Also that year King Wally, a biography of Lewis written by Adrian McGregor was published. Lewis was also inducted into the Sport Australia Hall of Fame in 1987. 1987 saw Lewis lead Queensland to a 2-1 Origin series win over NSW, though NSW won a fourth exhibition game played at the Veterans Memorial Stadium in Los Angeles. The Australians only played one test in 1987, suffering a shock 13–6 loss to New Zealand at Lang Park in July. It was the second time in succession that the Kangaroos, fresh from an unbeaten Kangaroo Tour, had lost a test to the Kiwis in Brisbane.

=== Brisbane Broncos ===
Several New South Wales Rugby League premiership clubs had attempted to lure Wally Lewis south during the 1980s, including the Bob Fulton coached Manly-Warringah which came closest to contracting him in 1986. However, the QRL, fearing they were going to lose Lewis (easily their biggest star) and possibly his Wynnum-Manly, Qld and Australian teammate Gene Miles to Manly soon after losing Souths players Gary Belcher and Mal Meninga to the Canberra Raiders, blocked the move to Sydney and Lewis stayed with the Seagulls. In 1988, Lewis finally got to play in the Sydney premiership when he was signed by the Brisbane Broncos as inaugural captain of the side upon their inception in 1988, leading the new club to a 44–10 win over defending NSWRL premiers Manly at Lang Park in their first ever game. Lewis was the Broncos' top try-scorer in their first season and also later had the honour of scoring the club's first hat-trick.

During the season Lewis was awarded the Harry Sunderland Medal as Australia's player of the 1988 Ashes series against Great Britain, whose 26–12 win in the dead rubber third test at the Sydney Football Stadium (SFS) was their first test victory over Australia since 1978. Lewis and teammate Sam Backo also joined Ken Irvine as the only Australian players to score a try in each test of an Ashes series. On 20 July 1988 Lewis played for Australia in their record 62-point win over Papua New Guinea, scoring a try. At the end of the season he captained Australia to victory over New Zealand in the final of the 1985 - 1988 Rugby League World Cup. Australia won the game 25–12 in front of 47,363 fans at Auckland's home of rugby union Eden Park, though Lewis broke his right forearm in the 15th minute of the game while tackling Kiwi winger Tony Iro. After receiving treatment, he bravely played on for a further 20 minutes, making a number of one armed tackles despite being an obvious target in defense. Late in the first half when it became clear that with a 21–0 lead Australia would win the game, coach Don Furner replaced Lewis with Terry Lamb.

Lewis won another man-of-the-match award in the second game of the 1989 State of Origin series. Lewis scored a famous try in the second half of the game played at the SFS, when he went on a 40-metre cross field run to the line where he outpaced a much younger Laurie Daley, and held off NSW fullback Garry Jack's tackle over the last 10 metres to score in the corner. From there Lewis was captain of the Australian team for their mid-season tour of New Zealand.

At the end of the 1990 season, due to salary cap restrictions, Lewis was not made a large enough offer to keep him at the Broncos, with Bennett citing the need to retain younger talent.

=== Gold Coast Seagulls and coaching ===
Following the souring of his relationship with the Broncos, Lewis was unwilling to move to Sydney for family reasons and in 1991, he joined the Gold Coast Seagulls and was appointed as captain by coach Malcolm Clift. He won his eighth and last man-of-the-match award in the first game of the State of Origin series that year, before playing both his last match for Queensland and Australia by the end of the season. He captained and coached Gold Coast during the 1992 NSWRL season but again finished the season in last place. In their last match under Lewis as captain-coach, the Gold Coast defeated Penrith, thus denying the Panthers a place in the finals play-offs. The following year he stopped playing but continued coaching the Seagulls, but departed after a third consecutive wooden spoon. In his time coaching Seagulls, the club had won just 7 games out of 44 played, losing the last 16 in a row.

Wally Lewis played his last game for the Seagulls in a match against a South Australian 'Select' team (which included his longtime friend Paul Vautin, as well as St George Dragons players Ricky Walford and Jeff Hardy) at the Thebarton Oval in Adelaide on 7 November 1992, the night before the Australian Formula One Grand Prix.

Lewis also coached the Queensland State of Origin side in 1993 and 1994 but never won a series.

=== Legacy ===
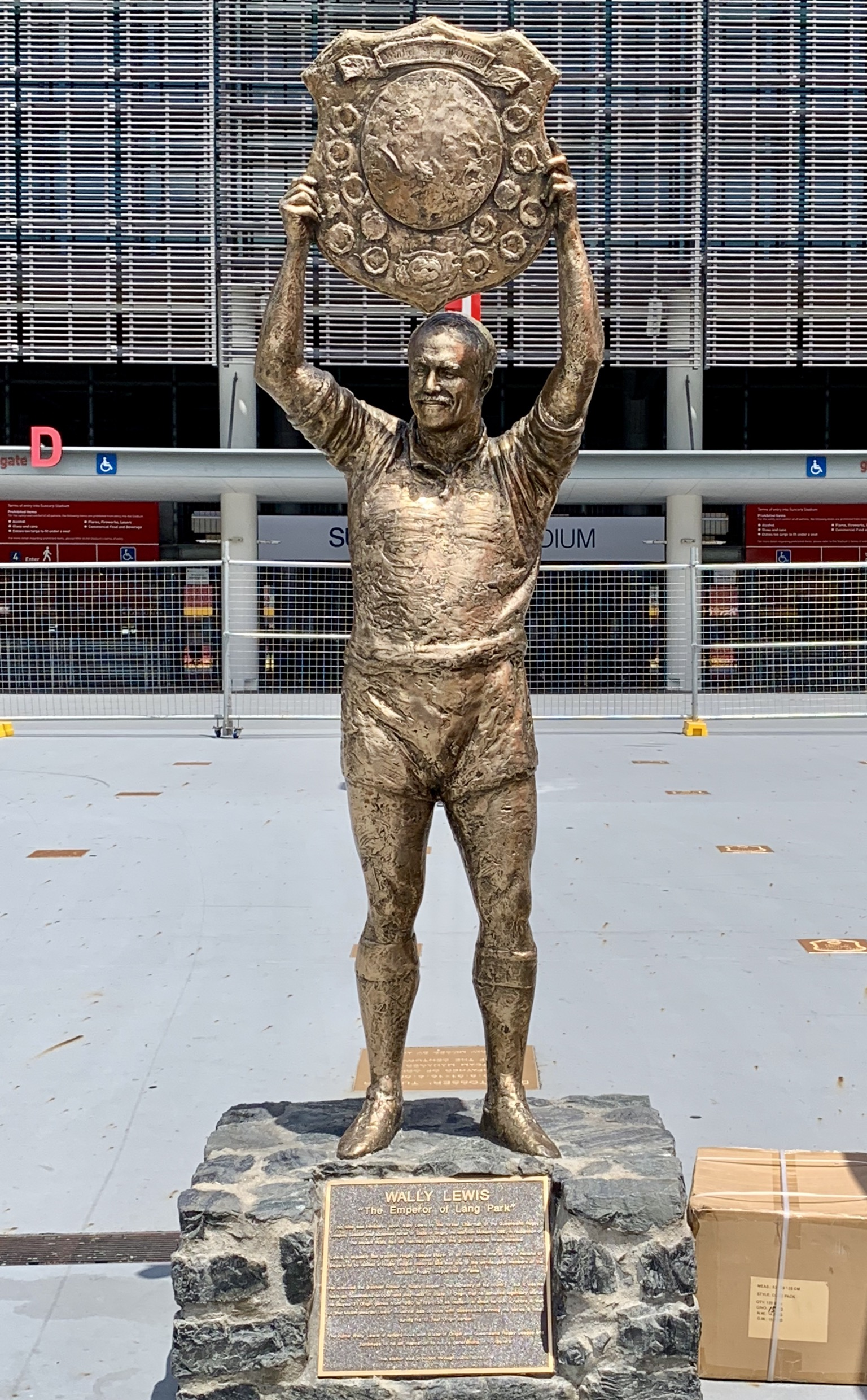
Wally Lewis statue outside Suncorp Stadium (Lang Park), Brisbane (2022)

Wally Lewis is remembered for his creative, playmaking football and great on-field confrontations, most notably one in the 1991 State of Origin series with Mark Geyer. Years before that his and Brett Kenny's likenesses were put onto the State of Origin winner's shield. The Wally Lewis Medal has been awarded to the Queensland player of the series in State of Origin from 1992 to 2003. Since 2004, it has been awarded to the player of the series from either side.

A bronze statue of Wally was raised at the entrance to Lang Park. The statue text reads:

WALLY LEWIS
The Emperor of Lang Park

This honour was bestowed upon Wally Lewis by the former Chairman of the Queensland Rugby League, Senator and acclaimed father of State of Origin, the late Ron McAullife, in recognition of the impact Wally had on matches played at this ground across three decades.

Lewis is arguably the greatest rugby league footballer of all time. He is one of only a handful of players to be named a Rugby League Immortal and was one of the six inaugural members of the Australian Rugby League Hall of Fame.

He achieved the greatest honour in Rugby League: the captaincy of his country, but it was his feats as Queensland skipper and playmaker in State of Origin that he achieved legendary status. He played 31 Origin games (30 as captain) and a record 8 Man of the Match awards over a 12-year period.

The name Wally Lewis is synonymous with State of Origin and Queensland Rugby League and continues to be an inspiration to future generations of footballers.

Wally Lewis has also appeared in numerous advertisements during and after his football playing career. Examples include promotions for XXXX beer and Burger King.

During the 2007 season at the Broncos' 20-year anniversary celebration, the club announced a list of the 20 best players to play for them to date which included Lewis.

In December 2009 Lewis was inducted into the Queensland Sports Hall of Fame.

==== Quotes ====
- "Lewis has to be number one because he's the only bloke who dominated the game at the highest level, in State of Origin, over a long period." Ray Warren, Australian sports commentator
- "Certainly he's the best I've ever seen in the rugby codes, and my memory goes back to Raper and Gasnier, Catchpole and Hawthorne." Peter Meares, Australian sports commentator and writer.
- "Lewis is the greatest player at representative level I've seen – and I've seen some great players, I was there when Gas and Chook were at the end of their careers." Arthur Beetson, Australian former national team coach
- "...all great players, but I haven't seen anyone step past or ahead of Wally Lewis. You've got the right bloke in at No. 1." Steve Mortimer, former New South Wales captain.
- "For what it is worth, I rate him as the best footballer I ever laid eyes on." Bill Harrigan, leading referee
- "I've got to say here and now Wally is the greatest footballer I've seen, and all those great players knew that Wally was the greatest." George Lovejoy, Queensland rugby league commentator

== Personal life ==
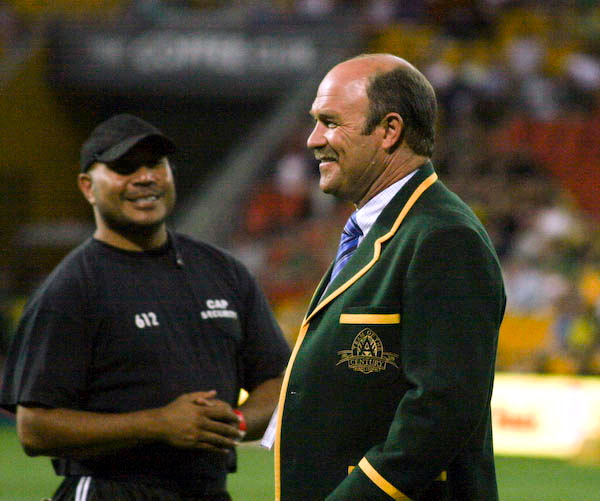
Lewis in 2008

In November 1984, Lewis married Jacqueline in St John's Cathedral (Brisbane); however, they separated in 2021. Together, they have two sons and one daughter: Mitchell, Lincoln and Jamie-Lee.

Wally's son, Lincoln, was a full-time actor on the Seven Network television drama, Home and Away, winning a TV Week Logie Award for best male new talent. His other son, Mitchell is a presenter on the Nova FM radio station, Nova 106.9 in Brisbane as the station's sports reporter and assistant producer on the Ash, Luttsy & Nikki breakfast show. His daughter Jamie-Lee was born profoundly deaf. The family got confirmation of this on the day of the final State of Origin game of the 1991 series, prompting Wally's decision to retire from Origin football following the game. Jamie-Lee is a water polo player who is currently on a scholarship to the Queensland Academy of Sport who has represented Australia, and is the first deaf person in the world to ever represent her country's national hearing team.

In May 2010, Lewis was rushed to hospital and had his gallbladder removed.

Wally Lewis completed his autobiography, Out of the Shadows: A Champion's Return to the Spotlight, in 2009.

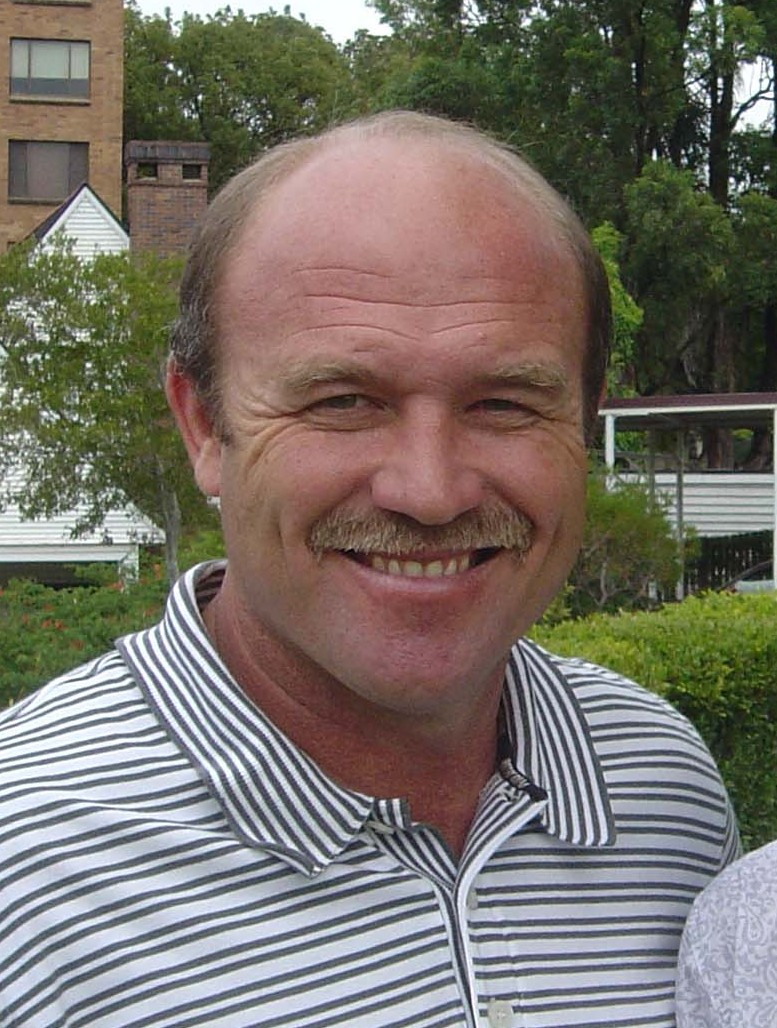
Wally Lewis "The King" in 2004

Lewis is well known as a big fan of The Phantom comic series.

Following his retirement from the sport, Lewis became a television sports presenter, first on Seven Nightly News Brisbane, before moving to the higher-rating Nine News Queensland where he remained until he stepped down from the role, citing health concerns, at the beginning of January 2023.

=== Epilepsy ===
During the nightly news broadcast of 16 November 2006, Lewis previewed the sports segment but was not onscreen when the program returned from the commercial break, with newsreader Bruce Paige instead presenting the sports segment. A similar event occurred two weeks later, on 30 November, when Lewis appeared onscreen and began to read the autocue, saying "Good evening" before seeming distressed. A scheduled report was then played, with Paige delivering the rest of the bulletin. Following these events, Lewis was given medical leave for the rest of the year. The following night, Lewis revealed that he had epilepsy. Lewis has revealed in his book that his on-air disorientation was caused by the condition.

On 21 February 2007, Lewis underwent brain surgery to help his epilepsy at Austin Hospital in Melbourne. The surgery was reported as a success by Gavin Fabinyi, Director of Neurosurgery. He has since made a full recovery.

Lewis was not expected to make a return as a TV reporter until 29 January but delivered a flawless report alongside new sports presenter Steve Haddan. In September 2007, Lewis appeared on-air for the first time since the surgery, and by 2009 had returned to presenting on weeknights.

Lewis is quoted as saying that "People come and ask me now about things (from his rugby league career) and I just don't remember them at all – that's absolutely frightening."

Lewis said he wanted to work with epilepsy organisations and raise awareness about the condition. He is also the vice patron of the Hear and Say Centre, becoming involved with the charity organization after his daughter, Jamie-Lee, was born profoundly deaf.

== Statistics ==
=== Club ===
†	Denotes seasons in which Lewis won a BRL premiership

Season	Team	Matches	T	G	F/G	Pts
1978	Fortitude Valley	22	10	0	0	30
1979†	Fortitude Valley	20	19	0	1	58
1980	Fortitude Valley	21	16	2	0	52
1981	Fortitude Valley	18	11	0	1	34
1982	Fortitude Valley	15	5	0	2	17
1983	Fortitude Valley	15	10	9	0	58
1983–84	Wakefield Trinity	10	6	0	0	24
1984†	Wynnum-Manly	17	11	0	0	44
1985	Wynnum-Manly	16	7	0	2	30
1986†	Wynnum-Manly	14	6	8	0	40
1987	Wynnum-Manly	8	2	1	0	10
1988	Brisbane	19	15	8	0	76
1989	Brisbane	18	4	2	0	20
1990	Brisbane	9	1	1	0	6
1991	Gold Coast	14	3	2	0	16
1992	Gold Coast	20	3	1	0	14
Career totals		301	155	45	12	654 (Note: Tries were only worth three points until 1983.)

== Notes ==
Sporting positions
Preceded by Billy Johnstone; 1988-1990	Captain Gold Coast Seagulls; 1991–1992	Succeeded by Brent Todd; 1993
Preceded by team created	Captain Brisbane Broncos; 1988–1989	Succeeded by Gene Miles; 1990–1991
Preceded by David Green; 1983-1985	Captain Wynnum-Manly; 1986–1987	Succeeded by Doug Belford; 1988
Preceded by Max Krilich; 1982-1983	Captain Australia; 1984–1989	Succeeded by Mal Meninga; 1990-1994
Preceded by Ross Strudwick; 1977-1981	Captain Fortitude Valley; 1982–1983	Succeeded by Russell Klein; 1984
Preceded by Arthur Beetson; 1980	Captain Queensland; 1981–1991	Succeeded by Mal Meninga; 1992–1994
Media offices
Preceded by Sean Lawson; Ian Healy	Nine News Queensland; Weeknight sports presenter 1998–2006; 2009–2023	Succeeded by Ian Healy; Jonathan Uptin
