= Peter Wynn =

Australian rugby league footballer (born 1957)

Personal information
- Born: 23 December 1957 (age 68) Maitland, New South Wales, Australia

Playing information
- Position: Second-row
Club
Years	Team	Pld	T	G	FG	P
1976–78	Thirroul
1979–90	Parramatta Eels	175	43	0	0	152
	Total	175	43	0	0	152
Representative
Years	Team	Pld	T	G	FG	P
1979–85	New South Wales	6	1	0	0	4
1985	Australia	3	0	0	0	0
- Relatives: Graeme Wynn (brother)

Peter Wynn (born 23 December 1957) is an Australian former professional rugby league footballer who played in the 1970s, 1980s and 1990s. He played for the Parramatta Eels in the New South Wales Rugby League premiership competition.

== Playing career ==
He is the older brother of fellow rugby league player Graeme Wynn. His position of choice was in the second row. However, lack of players of sufficient quality at Parramatta often forced Wynn to play in the front row although this was less suited to his very tall, lanky build.

Originally beginning his career at Thirroul in the Illawarra competition before being signed to Parramatta in 1979. Wynn tasted his first representative success that same year making his debut for the New South Wales side. He was denied the Dally M Rookie of the Year award only by his younger brother.

After such a start to his first grade career the early eighties were to become forgettable ones for Wynn whom suffered several serious injuries that restricted him to just fourteen games (out of a total of 83 played by the club) in Parramatta's three premiership years 1981-82-83. Despite his injury problems Wynn tasted premiership success with the Parramatta club on three occasions in 1982, 1983 and 1986.

In 1985, Wynn was Man of the match in State of Origin game I at Lang Park and his form throughout that series was so impressive that he was chosen to tour New Zealand and played in all three Tests. However, fitness problems prevented him from going on the 1986 Kangaroo tour, and even when fully fit and in form during 1987, Wynn was not able to break back into the representative scene. His last three seasons were severely affected by injury, with a broken ankle sidelining him after six games in 1988 and major injuries keeping him off the field in 1990 until late in the season, when he was used on the reserves bench.

After his retirement from rugby league Wynn still remained somewhat involved in the game serving as a member of the rugby league judiciary during the 1990s, and then he later opened a chain of sporting stores under the name of Peter Wynn's Score.

In 2002, Wynn was inducted into Parramatta's hall of fame.

== Matches played and points scored ==
Records for Peter Wynn
Team	Years	Matches	Matches as replacement player	Tries	Goals	F/G	Points
Thirroul	1976–1978						
Parramatta	1979–1990	154	12	42	-	-	148
New South Wales	1979, 1984 – 1985	6	-	1	-	-	4
Australia	1985	3	-	-	-	-	–
Total	1979–1990	163	12	43	-	-	152
