= Greg Dowling =

Australia international rugby league footballer

Leader of the United Australia Party in Queensland
- In office 31 July 2020 – 31 October 2020
- Preceded by: John Bjelke-Petersen

Personal details
- Born: Greg Ian Dowling; 15 January 1959 (age 67) Cairns, Queensland, Australia
- Party: United Australia (since 2019)
- Rugby league career

Playing information
- Position: Prop
Club
Years	Team	Pld	T	G	FG	P
1981	Wynnum-Manly	11	0	0	0	0
1984–85	Wynnum-Manly	47	6	0	0	24
1985–86	Wigan	25	5	0	1	21
1987	Northern Suburbs	12	5	0	0	20
1988–91	Brisbane Broncos	69	6	0	0	24
	Total	164	22	0	1	89
Representative
Years	Team	Pld	T	G	FG	P
1984–87	Queensland	11	4	0	0	16
1984–87	Australia	12	0	0	0	0

Greg Ian Dowling (born 15 January 1959) is an Australian former politician and professional rugby league footballer who played in the 1980s and 1990s. An Australian international and Queensland State of Origin representative prop forward, he played his club football mostly in Brisbane with a spell playing for English club, Wigan.

== Rugby league career ==
A prop from Ingham, Queensland, Dowling started his career with the Wynnum-Manly Seagulls, making his debut in 1981. Dowling did not play in the 1982 BRL season, instead serving as Wynnum-Manly's manager. He scored a freakish try during the 1984 State of Origin series. In Game 2, played on a wet and muddy Sydney Cricket Ground, Maroons captain Wally Lewis put up a chip-kick only metres out from the try line. The ball hit the crossbar on the full and bounced back down. Somehow Dowling managed to catch the slippery ball on the full only centimetres from the ground to score under the posts, helping the Maroons to a series winning 14–2 win. His club, Wynnum-Manly won the Brisbane Rugby League premiership final that year. He also played for the Brisbane Rugby League team that defeated the Eastern Suburbs Roosters in the 1984 National Panasonic Cup Final.

Dowling played at prop forward for Queensland in all three games of the 1985 State of Origin series. Dowling also played in both test matches of the 1985 Kangaroo Tour of New Zealand. He is also remembered for his sideline fight with New Zealand prop Kevin Tamati during the first test of the Trans-Tasman Test series at Lang Park after both players had been sent to the sin-bin by French referee Julien Rascagneres. Both players received an 8-day suspension as a result of the fight.

Greg Dowling played at prop in Wigan's 34–8 victory over Warrington in the Lancashire Cup Final during the 1985–86 season at Knowsley Road, St. Helens, on Sunday 13 October 1985. He also played prop forward in Wigan's 18–4 victory over Hull Kingston Rovers in the 1985–86 John Player Special Trophy Final during the 1985–86 season at Elland Road, Leeds on Saturday 11 January 1986.

Dowling played for Queensland in Game I of the 1986 State of Origin series, scoring a try. At the end of the 1986 season, he was selected to go on the 1986 Kangaroo tour of Great Britain and France, and played at prop forward in every single test match of the tour. Dowling was selected to play for Queensland in all three games of the 1987 State of Origin series, scoring tries in the 1st and second games. He also played in the 4th exhibition match in the United States.

Dowling was contracted to be a member of the foundation team for the Brisbane Broncos in 1988. He was named the 1989 Brisbane Broncos player of the year. Injury forced him into retirement in 1991.

After retirement, he became a commentator for the ABC and a columnist for the Cairns Post.

== Political career ==
In March 2019, Dowling joined the United Australia Party, and the following month, was announced as the party's candidate for Herbert at the 2019 federal election.

In January 2020, Dowling announced he was running for mayor of Townsville at the 2020 local government elections, leading the "It's Time for Townsville" ticket. He was officially endorsed by Clive Palmer, who spent $625,000 on supporting Dowling's campaign. Dowling was unsuccessful, coming third with 17% of the vote against incumbent Jenny Hill and opponent Sam Cox.

In July 2020, Dowling was announced as the UAP's leader in Queensland and the party's candidate for Townsville at the 2020 Queensland state election.

== Personal life ==
Dowling currently resides in Townsville with two children, Lauren and Lachlan, and his wife Rhonda.

In 2000, Dowling was awarded the Australian Sports Medal for his contribution to Australia's international standing in rugby league.

After moving on from his McDonald's franchise in Atherton in 2008, he began his retirement. Soon realising this was not for him, he started new project which started at the end of 2009, an Oporto franchise in the Willows Shopping Centre in Townsville.
