= 1985 NSWRL season =

Rugby league competition

1985 New South Wales Rugby League
- Teams: 13
- Premiers: Canterbury-Bankstown (5th title)
- Minor premiers: St. George (15th title)
- Matches played: 163
- Points scored: 5,416
- Total attendance: 1,450,162
- Top points scorer: Mick Cronin (204)
- Wooden spoon: Illawarra Steelers (1st spoon)
- Rothmans Medal: Wayne Pearce
- Top try-scorer: Steve Linnane (17)

The 1985 New South Wales Rugby League premiership was the seventy-eighth season of professional rugby league football in Australia. Thirteen teams competed for the J J Giltinan Shield and Winfield Cup during the season, which culminated in a grand final between the Canterbury-Bankstown and St. George clubs. This season NSWRL teams also competed for the 1985 National Panasonic Cup.

== Season summary ==
The regular season commenced in March with reigning premiers Canterbury-Bankstown Bulldogs winning 18–4 against the Cronulla-Sutherland Sharks. Bulldogs forward Paul Langmack scored the first try of the season. Parramatta played their round 2 match against the Canberra at Orana Park following the opening of a new A$1.25m grandstand. It was the first match played at the venue since 1983. Parramatta hosted their remaining matches at Belmore Sports Ground with the new Parramatta Stadium to open in time for the 1986 season.

St. George would be undefeated through the opening eight rounds of the season, before losing to Balmain 24–19 at Kogarah Oval, the Tigers had been behind 13–0 after only 17 minutes of the match.

In the second half of the season, the NSWRL experimented by fixturing 11 matches played at the Sydney Cricket Ground on Monday nights, with matches broadcast live by Network 10. The experiment was hailed as a success with average attendance over 10,000 fans and an average television audience of 750,000.

Following the final round of the season, Penrith and Manly Warringah Sea Eagles finished level on 31 competition points to force a Tuesday night playoff for fifth place. The scores were tied at 6-all after 80 minutes forcing extra time. Manly led 7–6 early in the first half of extra time, but two goals by Penrith halfback Greg Alexander gave the Panthers a 10–7 victory.

Penrith joined minor premiers St. George in the finals with Balmain, Canterbury and Parramatta the other finalists.

=== Awards ===
- Rothmans Medal — Wayne Pearce (Balmain Tigers)
- Dally M Medal — Greg Alexander (Penrith Panthers)
- Rugby League Week Player of the Year — Ray Price (Parramatta Eels)

=== Teams ===
The lineup of clubs remained unchanged from the previous year, with 13 clubs contesting the 1985 premiership, including five Sydney-based foundation teams, another six from Sydney, one from greater New South Wales and one from the Australian Capital Territory.

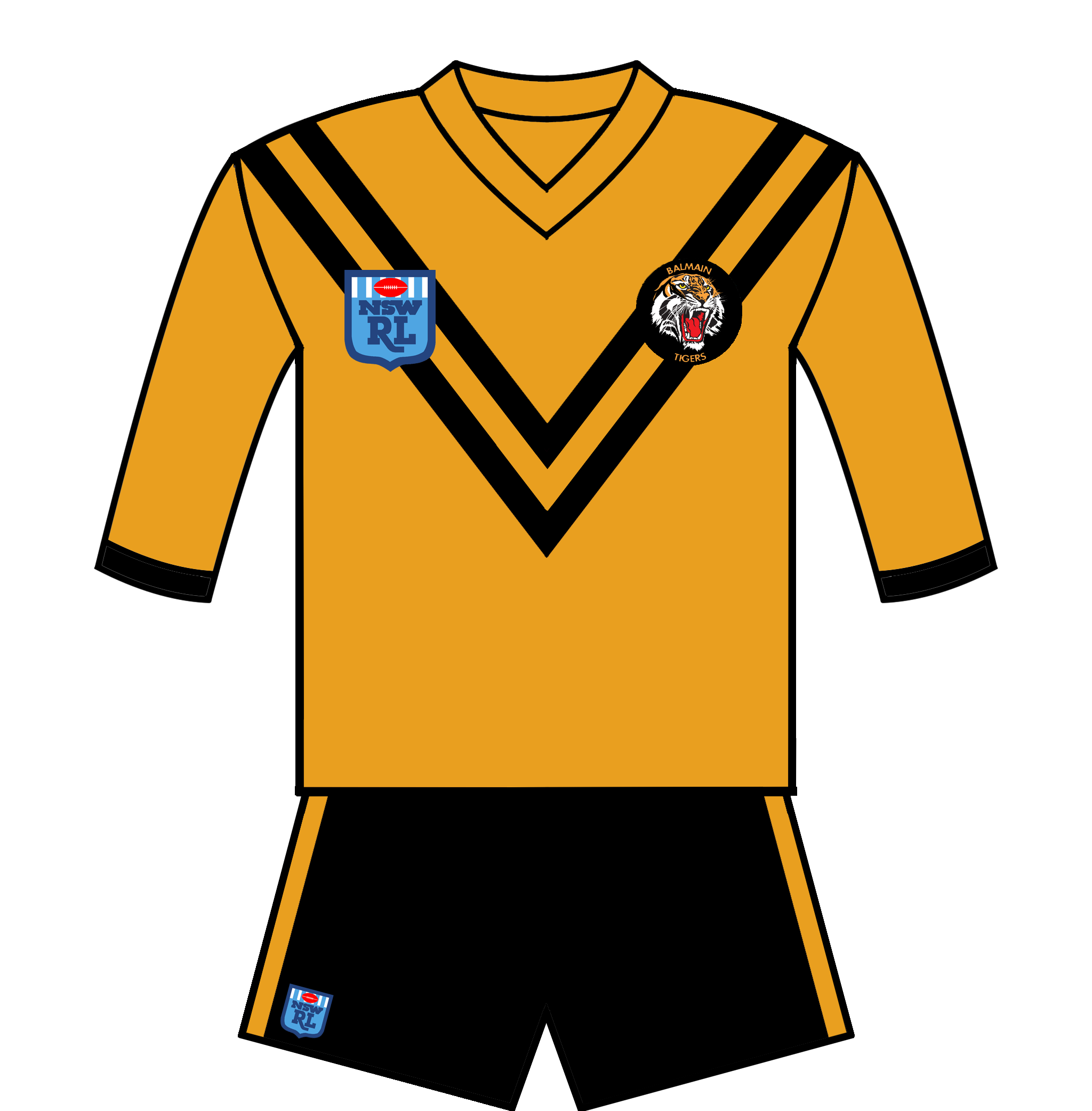
Balmain Tigers 78th season Ground: Leichhardt Oval; Coach: Frank Stanton; Captain: Wayne Pearce

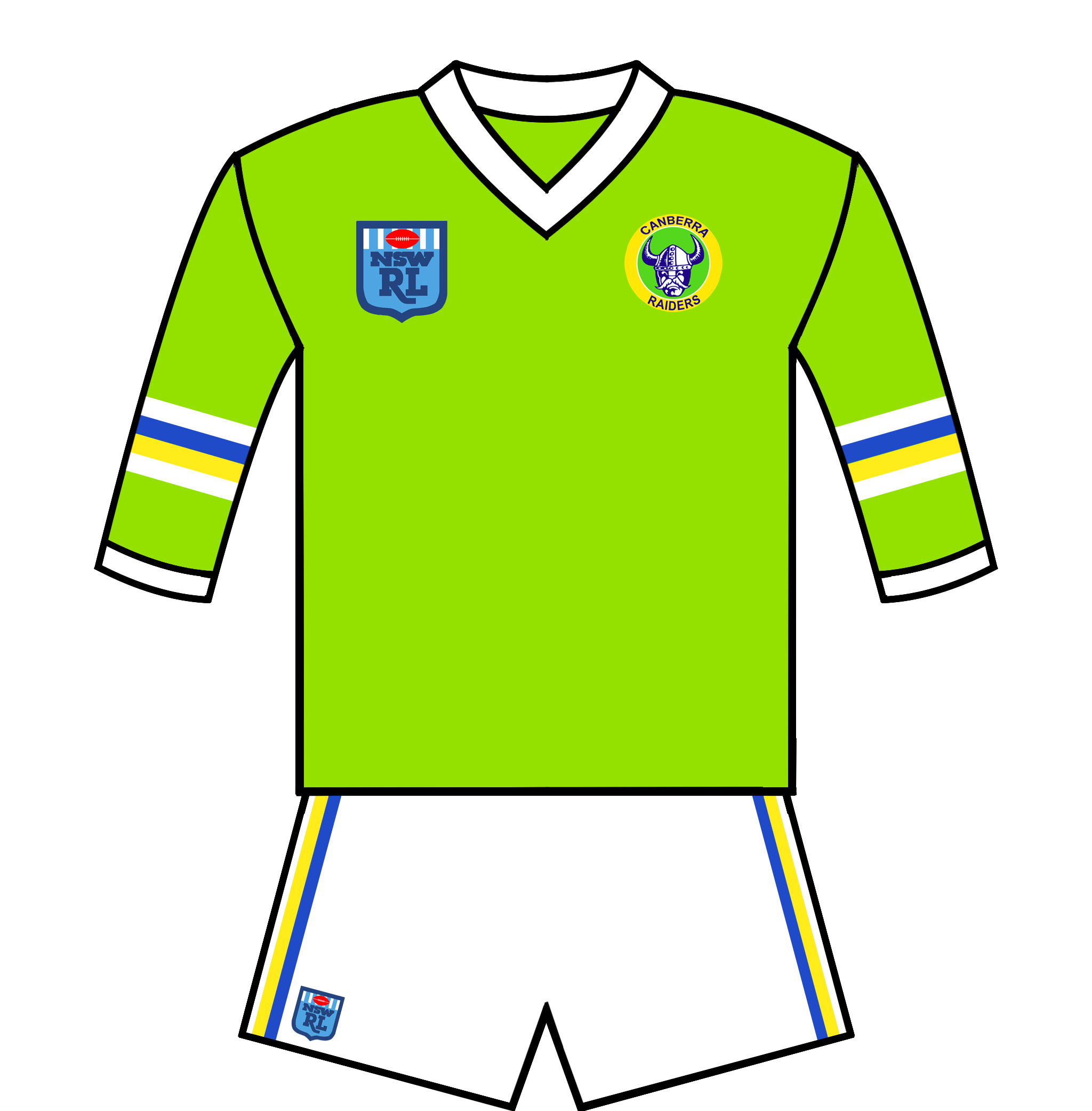
Canberra Raiders 4th season Ground: Seiffert Oval; Coach: Don Furner; Captain: Dean Lance

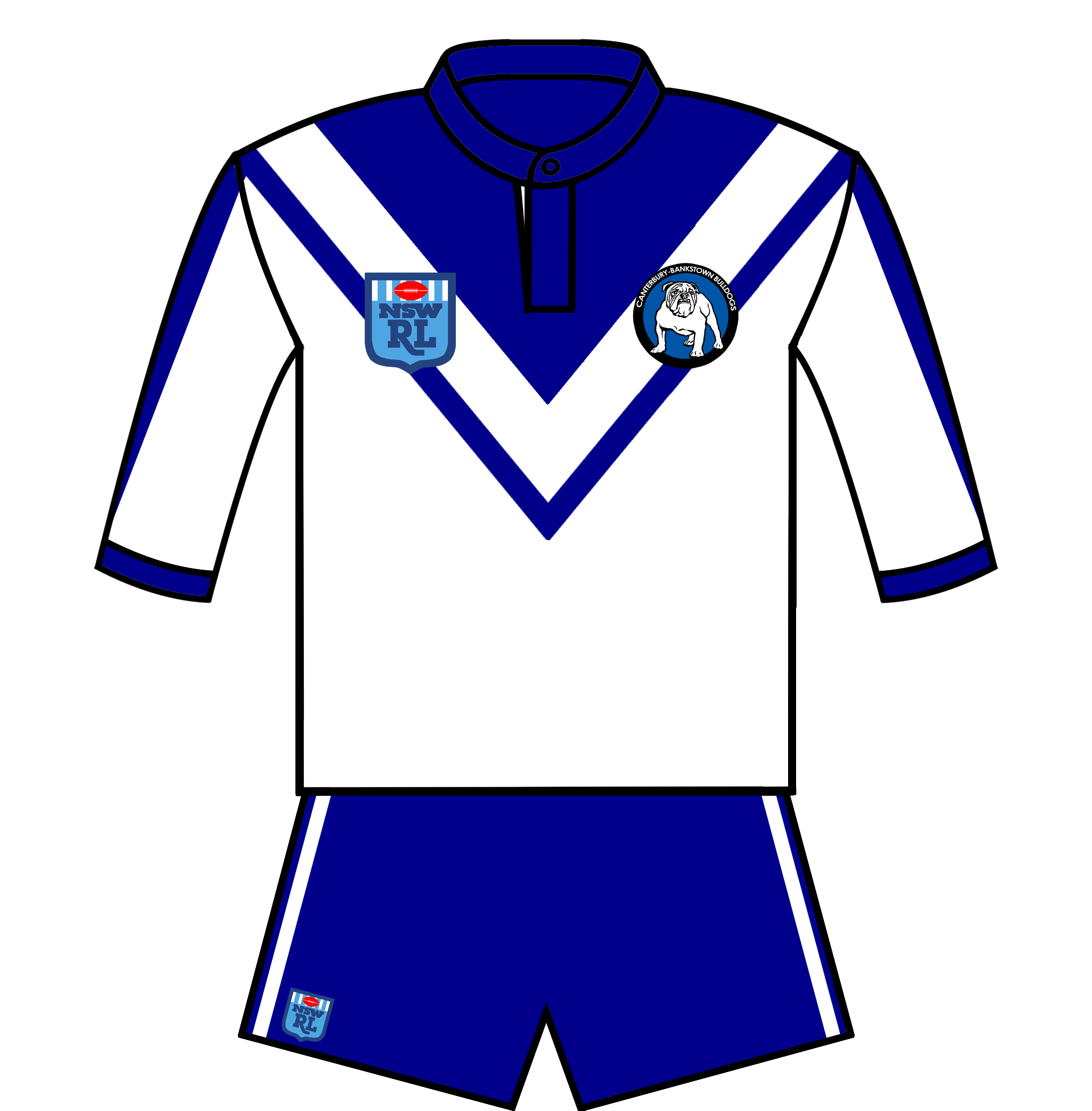
Canterbury-Bankstown Bulldogs 51st season Ground: Belmore Sports Ground; Coach: Warren Ryan; Captain: Steve Mortimer

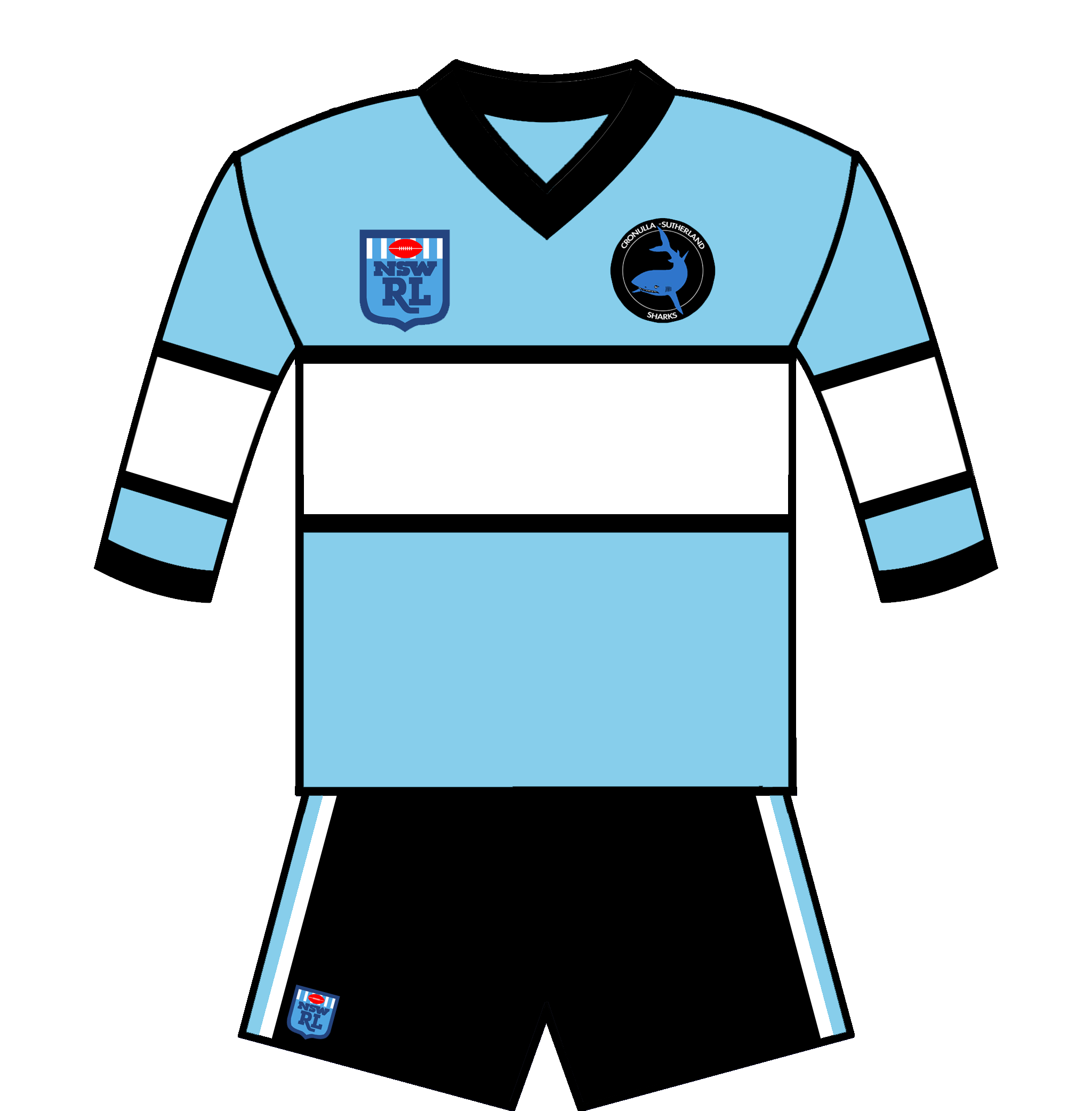
Cronulla-Sutherland Sharks 19th season Ground: Ronson Field; Coach: Terry Fearnley; Captain: David Hatch

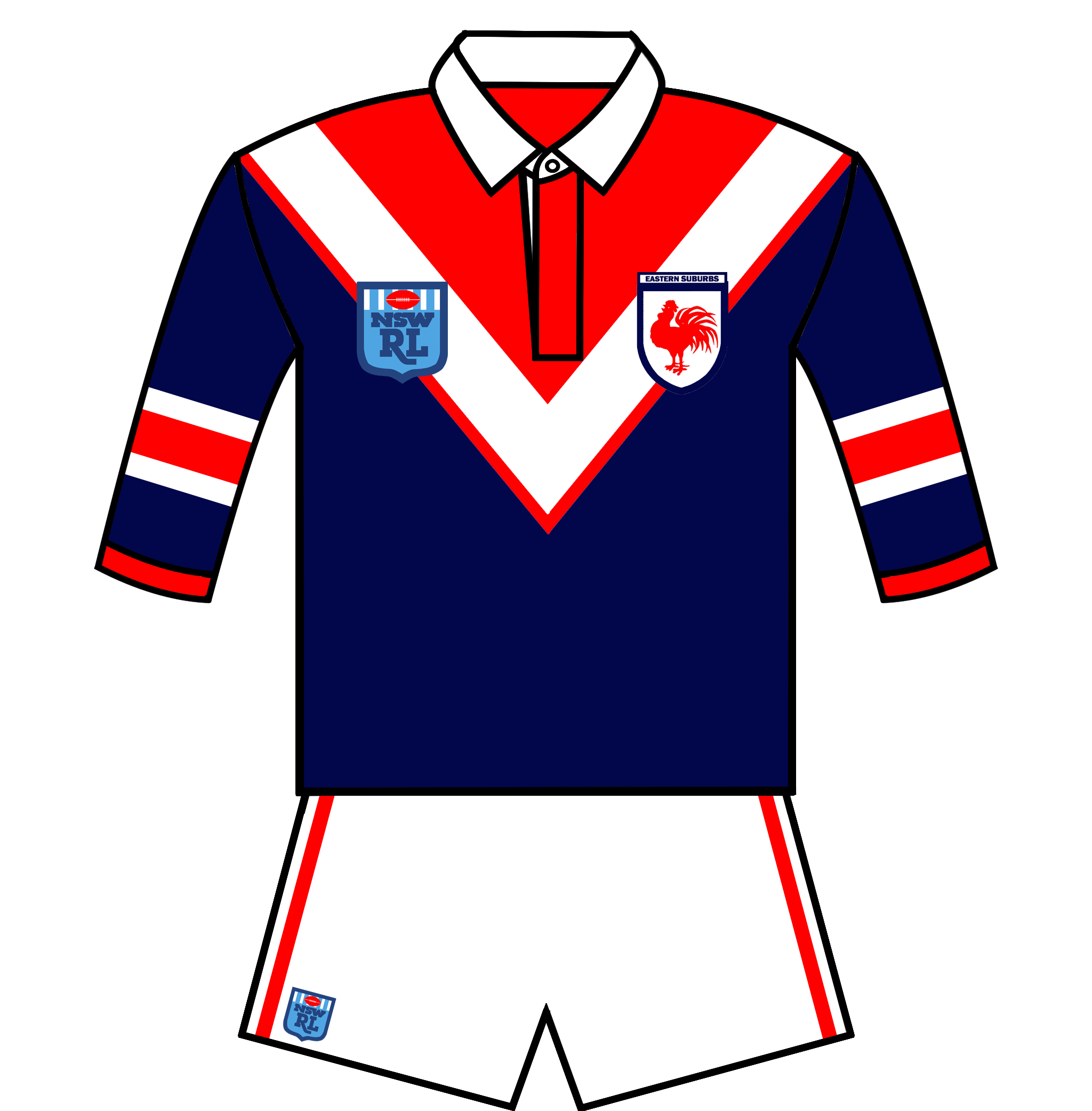
Eastern Suburbs Roosters 78th season Ground: Sydney Sports Ground; Coach: Arthur Beetson; Captain: Ron Gibbs→John Tobin

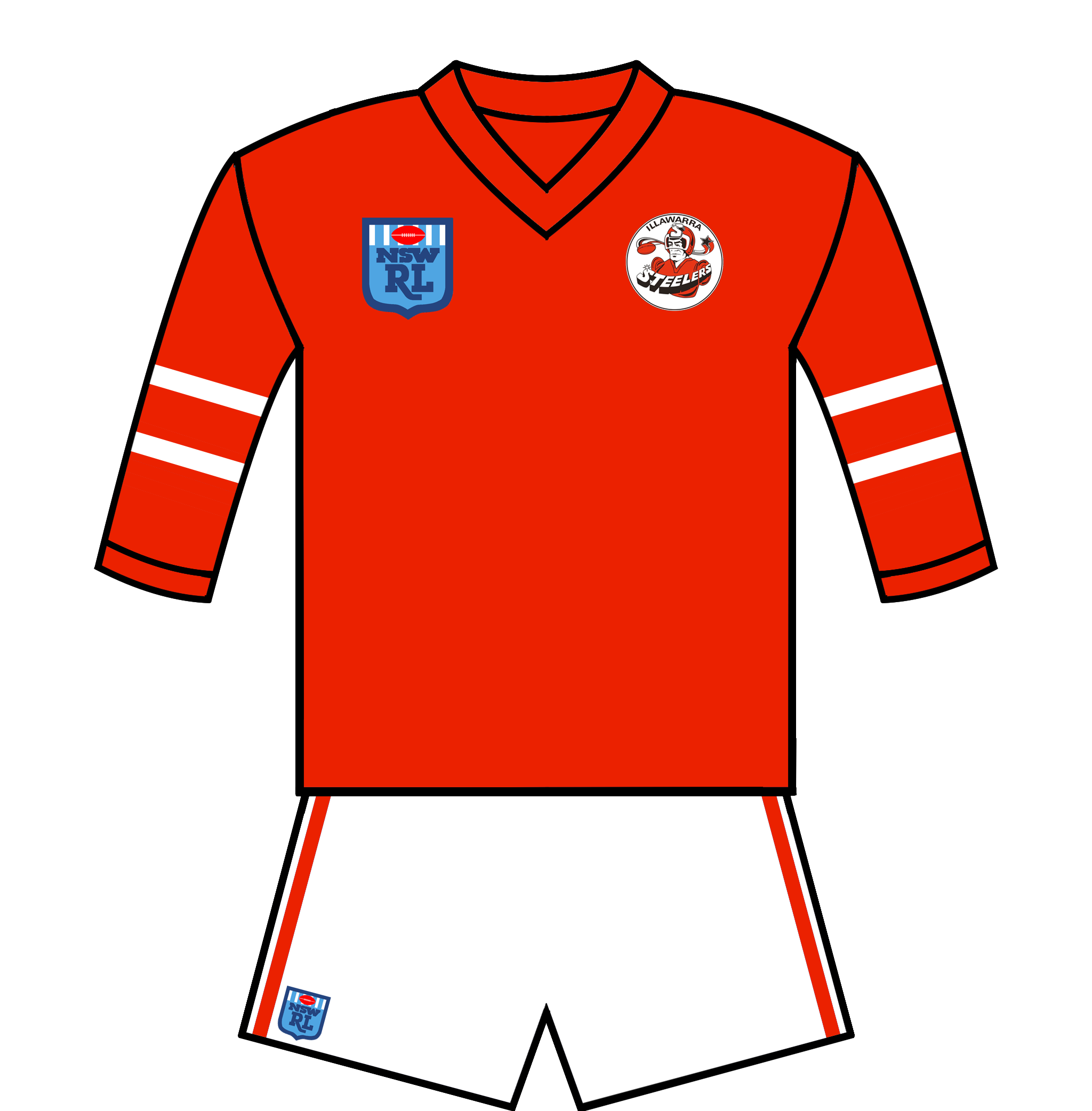
Illawarra Steelers 4th season Ground: Wollongong Showground; Coach: Brian Smith; Captain: Brian Hetherington

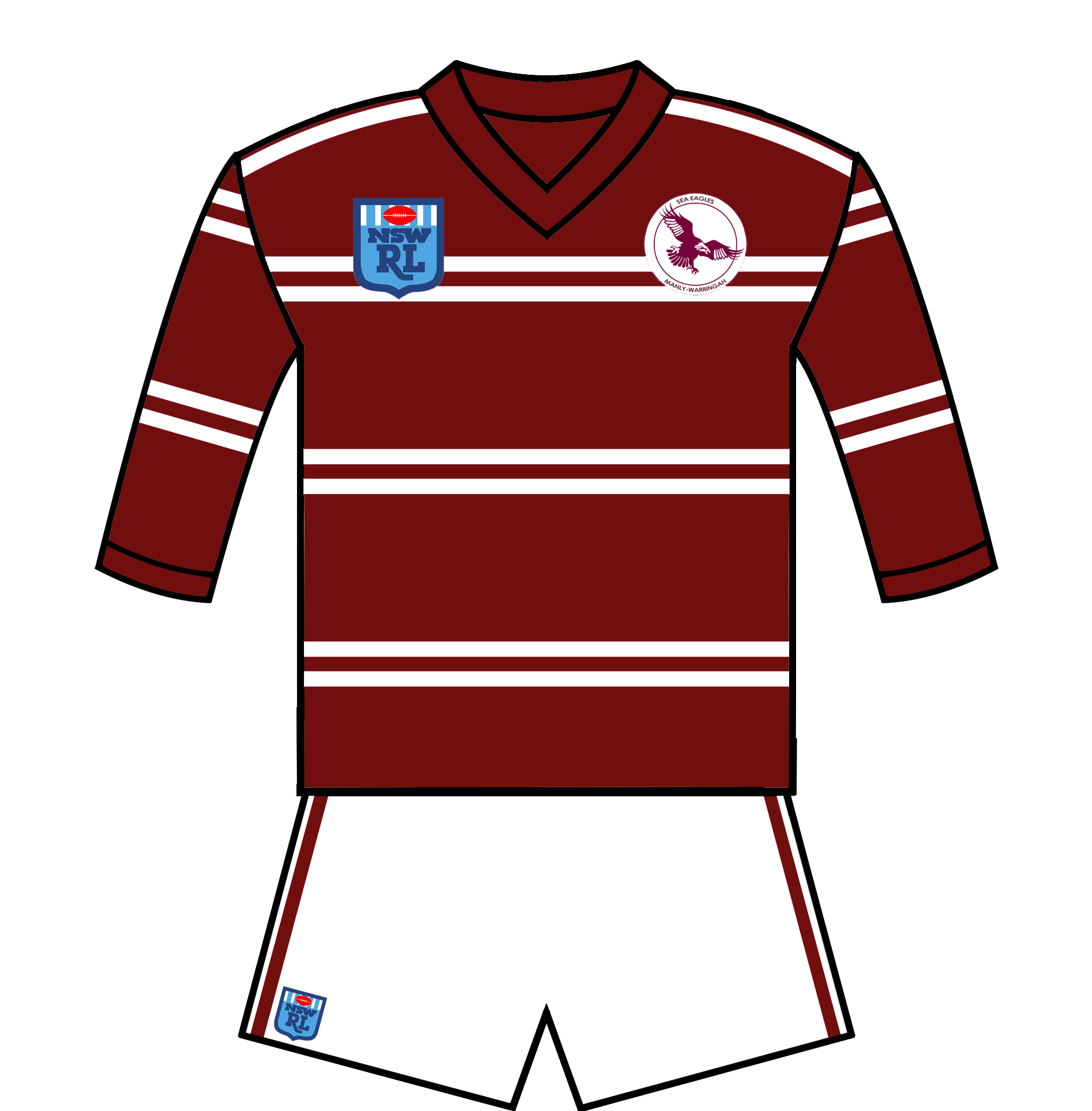
Manly-Warringah Sea Eagles 39th season Ground: Brookvale Oval; Coach: Bob Fulton; Captain: Glenn Ryan→Paul Vautin

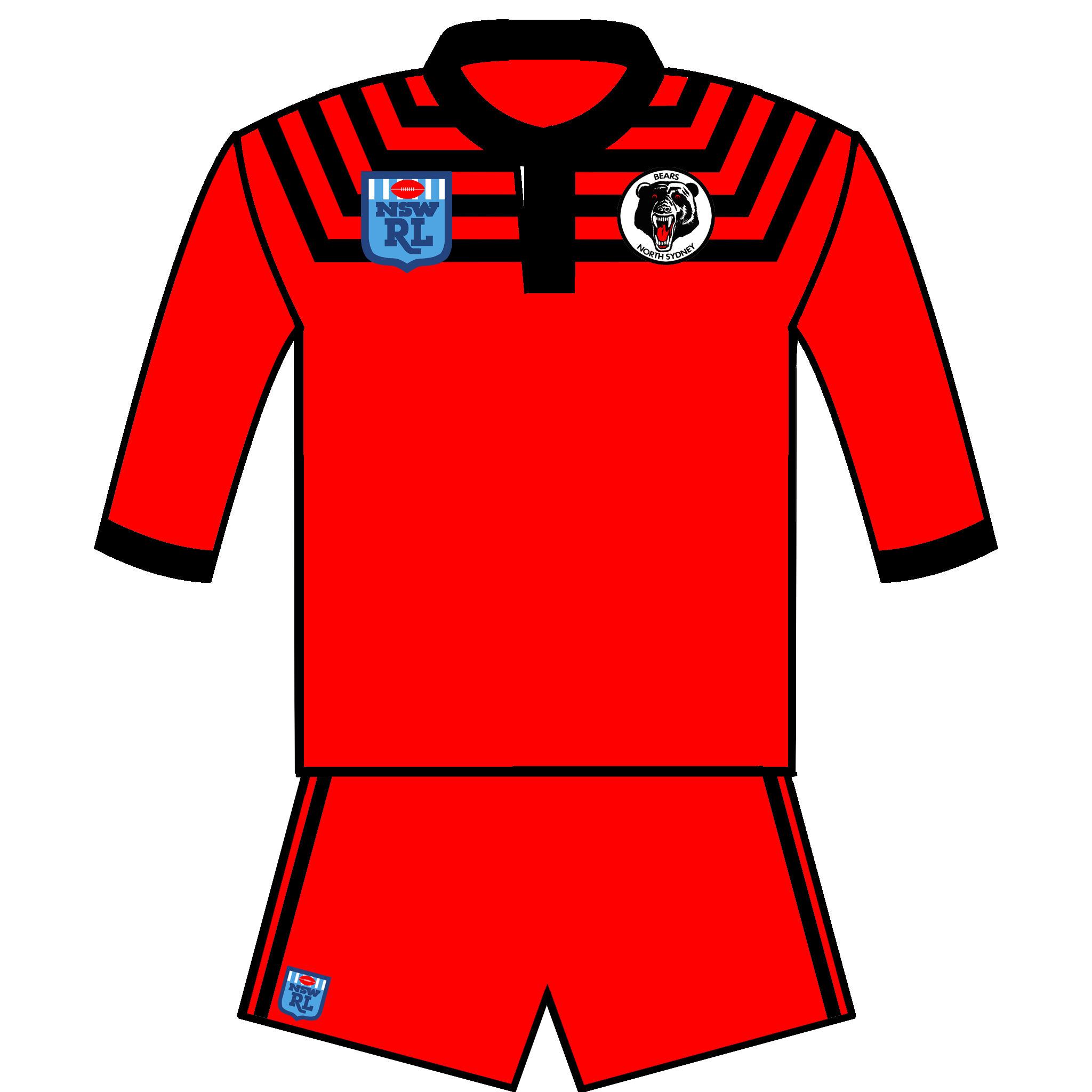
North Sydney Bears 78th season Ground: North Sydney Oval; Coach: Greg Hawick→Brian Norton; Captain: W. Honeywood→Fred Teasdell→Mark Graham

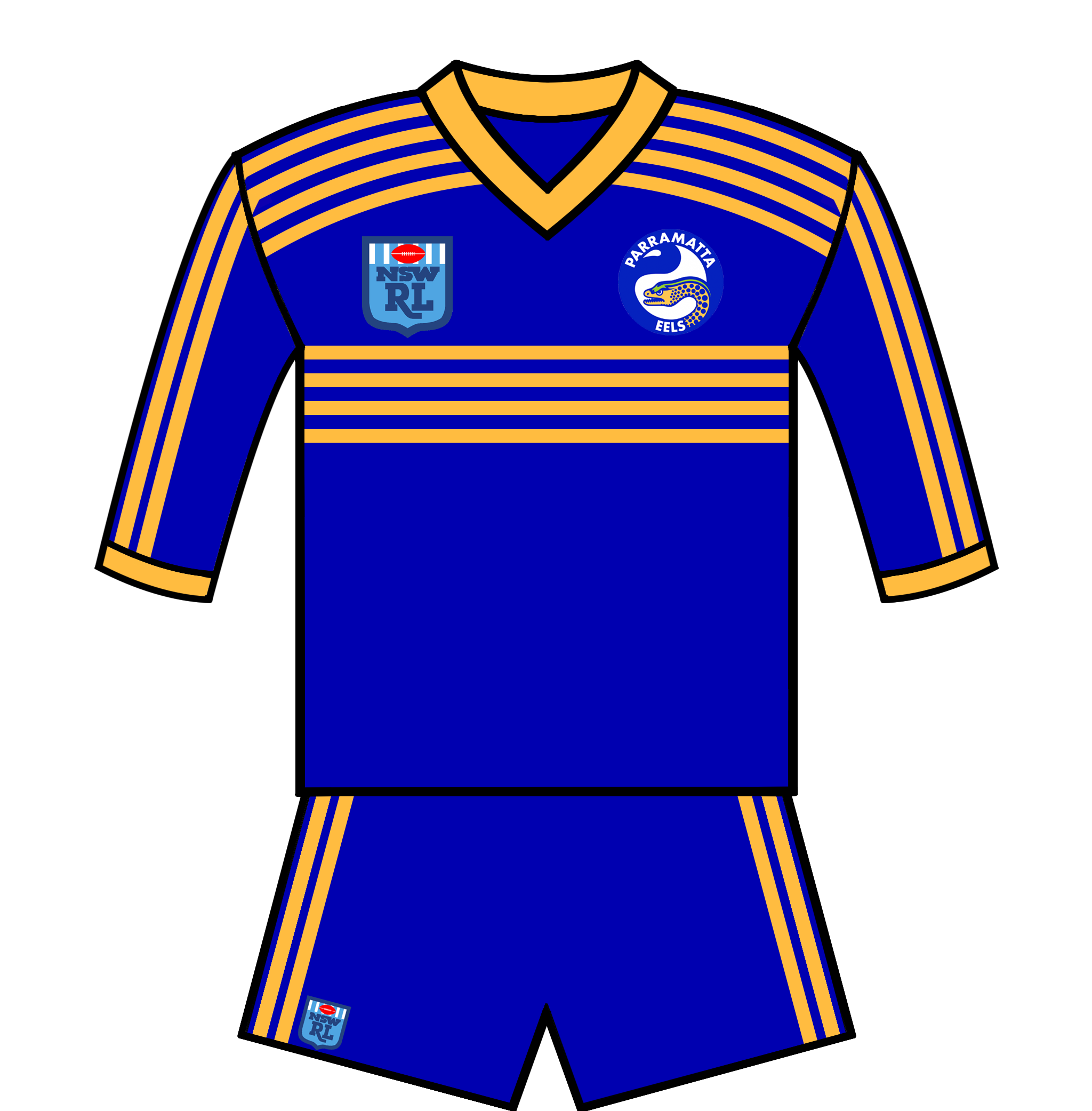
Parramatta Eels 39th season Ground: Belmore Sports Ground; Coach: John Monie; Captain: Ray Price

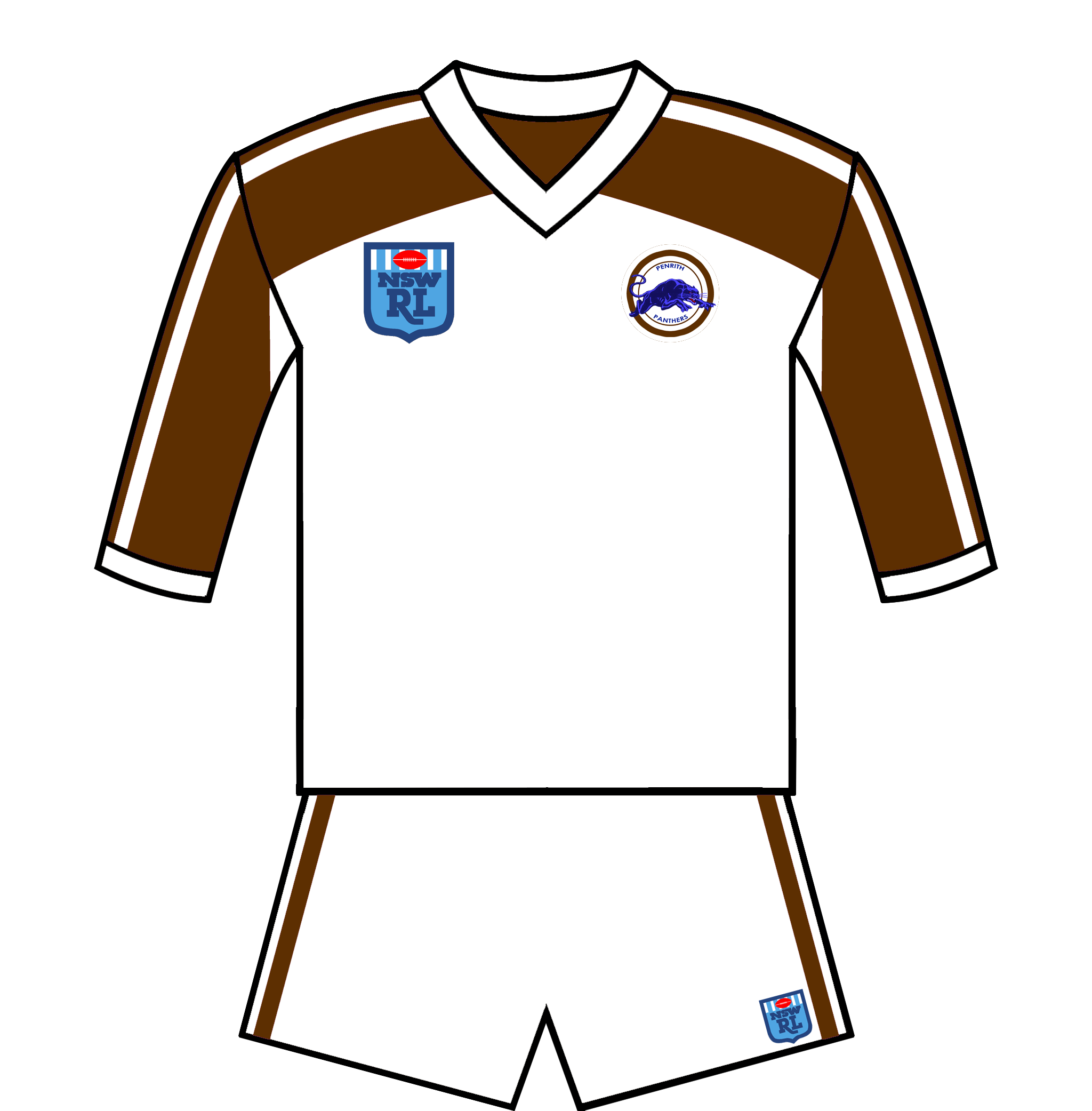
Penrith Panthers 19th season Ground: Penrith Park; Coach: Tim Sheens; Captain: Royce Simmons

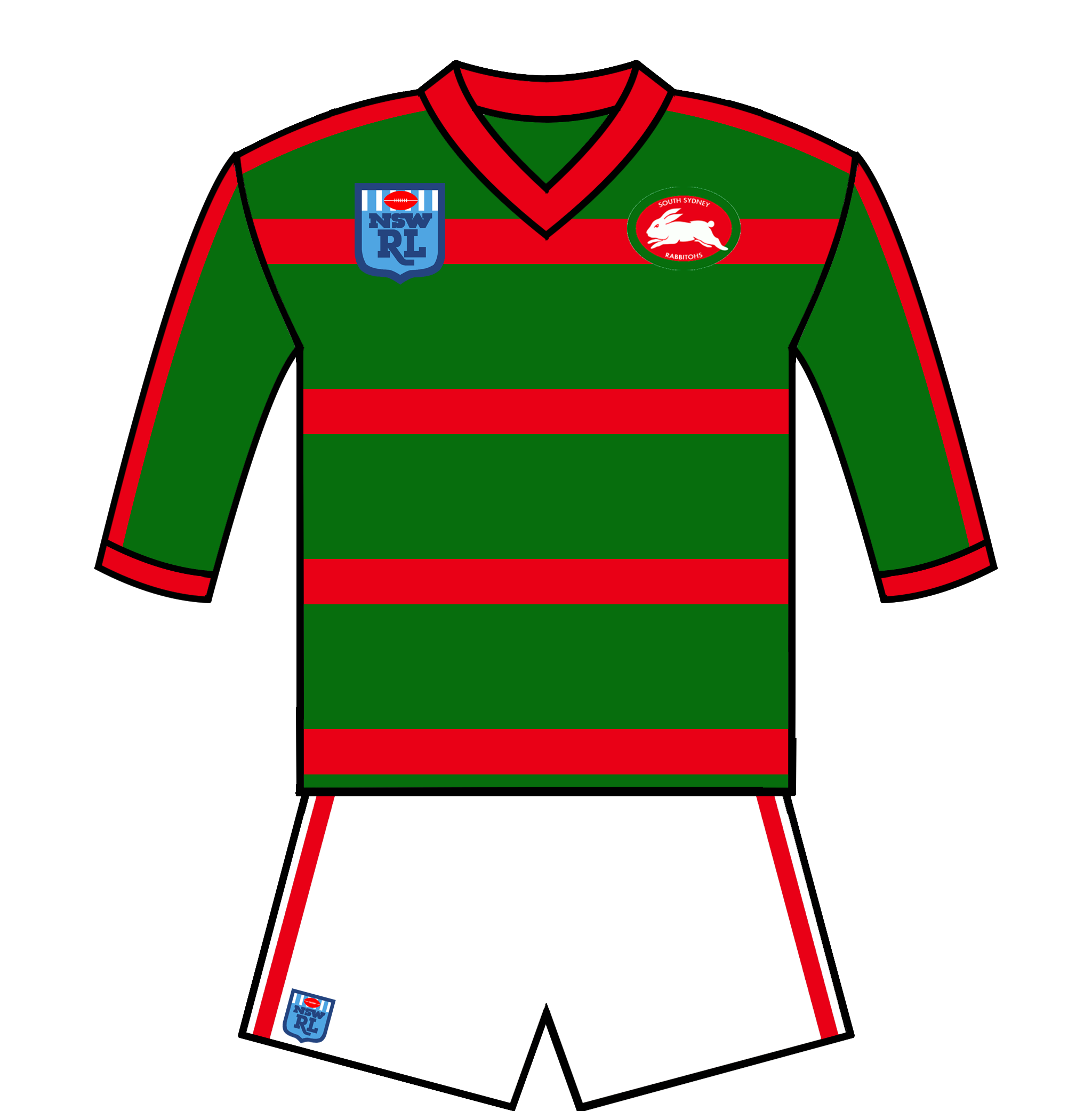
South Sydney Rabbitohs 78th season Ground: Redfern Oval; Coach: Ron Willey; Captain: David Boyle

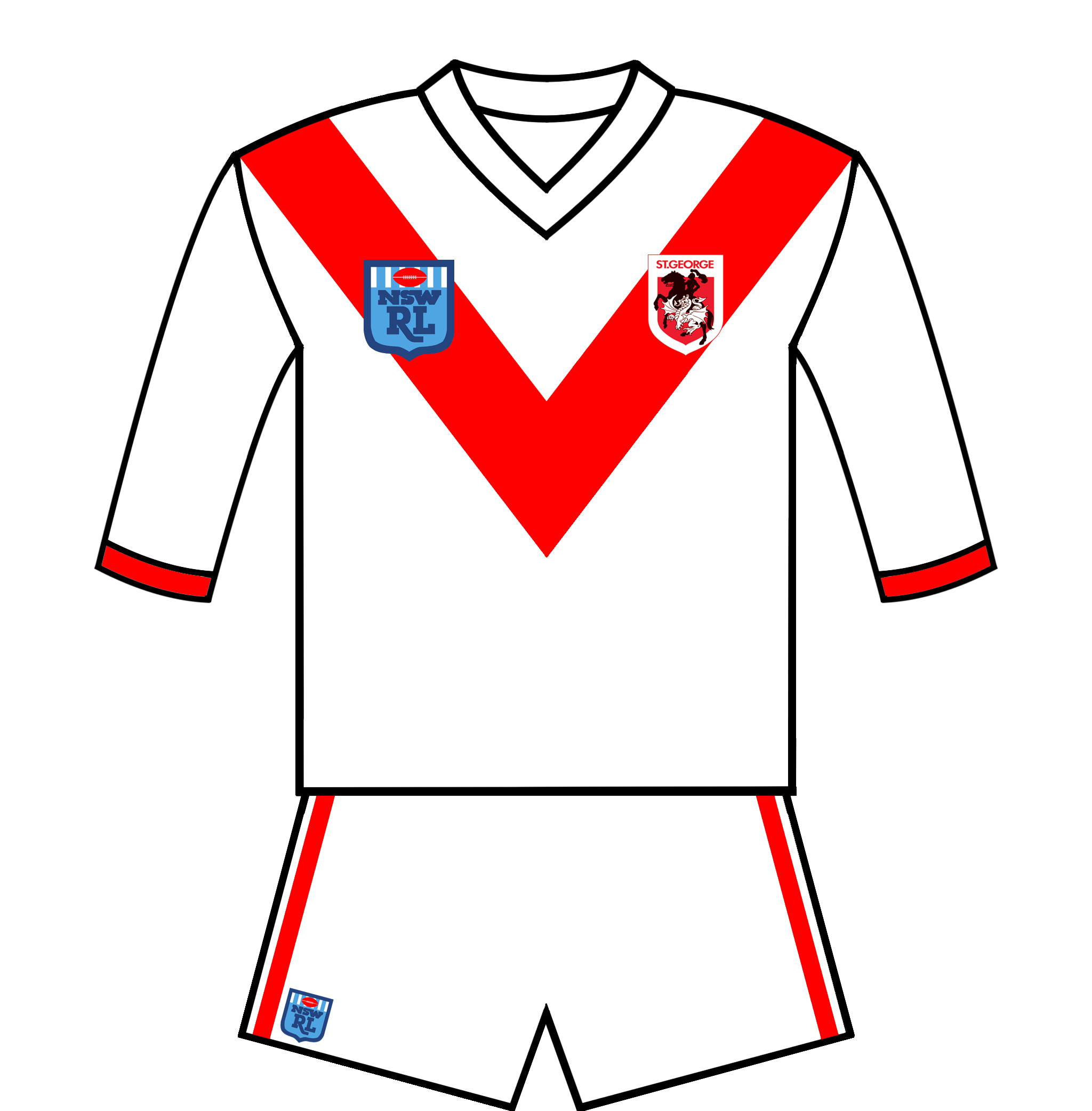
St. George Dragons 65th season Ground: Kogarah Oval; Coach: Roy Masters; Captain: Craig Young

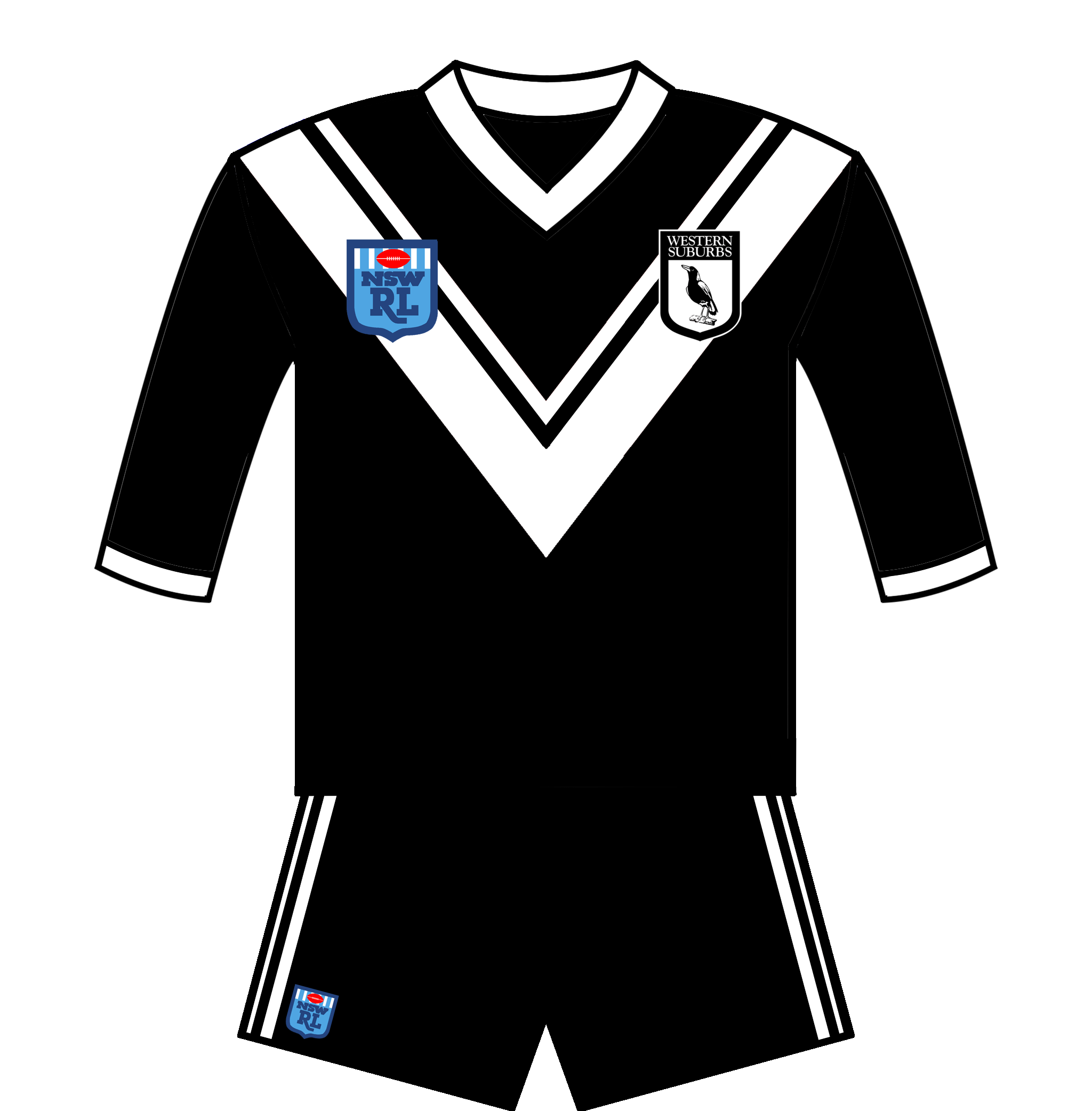
Western Suburbs Magpies 78th season Ground: Lidcombe Oval; Coach: Ken Gentle; Captain: Lee Crooks

== Regular season ==
Team	1	2	3	4	5	6	7	8	9	10	11	12	13	14	15	16	17	18	19	20	21	22	23	24	25	26	F1	F2	F3	F4	GF
Balmain Tigers	**NOR** **+20**	PEN +30	**CRO** **+24**	**WES** **+40**	**CBY** **−2**	MAN −4	**EAS** **−4**	X	STG +5	**ILA** **+8**	CAN +3	**PAR** **+13**	SOU +12	NOR +23	**PEN** **+6**	CRO −20	WES +6	CBY +6	**MAN** **+8**	EAS +1	X	**STG** **−2**	**ILA** **+13**	**CAN** **+18**	PAR −32	**SOU** **+18**	X	**CBY** **−6***	**PAR** **−28**		
Canberra Raiders	**ILA** **+10**	PAR −14	**NOR** **+8**	SOU +14	**PEN** **−30**	CRO −20	**WES** **+32**	CBY −24	**MAN**; **0**	EAS −2	**BAL** **−3**	STG +10	X	ILA +9	**PAR** **−14**	NOR +30	**SOU** **+7**	PEN −6	**CRO** **−2**	WES; 0	**CBY** **−12**	MAN −15	**EAS** **−18**	BAL −18	**STG** **−44**	X					
Canterbury-Bankstown Bulldogs	**CRO** **+14**	X	MAN −20	**EAS**; **0**	BAL +2	**STG**; **0**	ILA +6	**CAN** **+24**	**PAR** **−20**	**NOR** **+8**	SOU −15	**PEN** **−11**	WES +52	CRO +8	X	**MAN** **+4**	EAS +7	**BAL** **−6**	STG −10	**ILA** **+20**	CAN +12	**PAR** **+15**	NOR +18	**SOU** **+18**	PEN +14	**WES** **+28**	X	BAL +6*	STG −11	**PAR** **+26**	STG +1
Cronulla-Sutherland Sharks	CBY −14	**EAS** **−20**	BAL −24	**STG** **−10**	**ILA** **+8**	**CAN** **+20**	PAR −4	**NOR** **+14**	SOU −6	**PEN** **−6**	X	WES +18	**MAN** **+15**	**CBY** **−8**	EAS −7	**BAL** **+20**	STG −18	ILA +26	CAN +2	**PAR** **+8**	NOR +12	SOU −2	PEN −8	X	**WES** **+26**	MAN −6					
Eastern Suburbs Roosters	**SOU** **−18**	CRO +20	WES +38	CBY; 0	**MAN** **−12**	X	BAL +4	**STG** **−4**	ILA +2	**CAN** **+2**	PAR −26	**NOR** **−4**	PEN +20	SOU −8	**CRO** **+7**	**WES**; **0**	**CBY** **−7**	MAN −22	X	**BAL** **−1**	STG; 0	**ILA** **−10**	CAN +18	**PAR** **+2**	NOR +16	**PEN** **−32**					
Illawarra Steelers	CAN −10	**NOR** **−5**	**SOU** **+13**	PEN +6	CRO −8	WES −10	**CBY** **−6**	MAN −12	**EAS** **−2**	BAL −8	**STG** **−8**	X	PAR −20	**CAN** **−9**	NOR +18	SOU +4	**PEN** **−26**	**CRO** **−26**	**WES** **−12**	CBY −20	**MAN** **−6**	EAS +10	BAL −13	STG −12	X	**PAR** **−2**					
Manly Warringah Sea Eagles	**PEN** **−12**	WES +20	**CBY** **+20**	X	EAS +12	**BAL** **+4**	STG −4	**ILA** **+12**	CAN; 0	**PAR** **+4**	NOR +14	**SOU** **−8**	CRO −15	PEN −12	**WES** **+24**	CBY −4	X	**EAS** **+22**	BAL −8	**STG** **−17**	ILA +6	**CAN** **+15**	PAR −12	**NOR** **+18**	SOU −26	**CRO** **+6**	PEN −3				
North Sydney Bears	BAL −20	ILA +5	CAN −8	**PAR** **−2**	X	SOU +4	**PEN** **−12**	CRO −14	**WES** **+2**	CBY −8	**MAN** **−14**	EAS +4	**STG** **−16**	**BAL** **−23**	**ILA** **−18**	**CAN** **−30**	PAR −8	X	**SOU** **+4**	PEN; 0	**CRO** **−12**	WES +16	**CBY** **−18**	MAN −18	**EAS** **−16**	**STG** **−8**					
Parramatta Eels	STG −20	**CAN** **+14**	X	NOR +2	**SOU** **+17**	PEN −8	**CRO** **+4**	WES +6	CBY +20	MAN −4	**EAS** **+26**	BAL −13	**ILA** **+20**	**STG** **+4**	CAN +14	X	**NOR** **+8**	SOU −13	**PEN** **+11**	CRO −8	**WES** **+38**	CBY −15	**MAN** **+12**	EAS −2	**BAL** **+32**	ILA +2	X	**PEN** **+32**	BAL +28	CBY −26	
Penrith Panthers	MAN +12	**BAL** **−30**	STG −3	**ILA** **−6**	CAN +30	**PAR** **+8**	NOR +12	**SOU** **+5**	X	CRO +6	**WES** **−9**	CBY +11	**EAS** **−20**	**MAN** **+12**	BAL −6	**STG** **−10**	ILA +26	**CAN** **+6**	PAR −11	**NOR**; **0**	SOU −4	X	**CRO** **+8**	WES +26	**CBY** **−14**	EAS +32	**MAN** **+3**	PAR −32			
South Sydney Rabbitohs	EAS +18	**STG** **−6**	ILA −13	**CAN** **−14**	PAR −17	**NOR** **−4**	X	PEN −5	**CRO** **+6**	WES −8	**CBY** **+15**	MAN +8	**BAL** **−12**	**EAS** **+8**	STG −24	**ILA** **−4**	CAN −7	**PAR** **+13**	NOR −4	X	**PEN** **+4**	**CRO** **+2**	**WES** **+8**	CBY −18	**MAN** **+26**	BAL −18					
St. George Dragons	**PAR** **+20**	SOU +6	**PEN** **+3**	CRO +10	**WES** **+12**	CBY; 0	**MAN** **+4**	EAS +4	**BAL** **−5**	X	ILA +8	**CAN** **−10**	NOR +16	PAR −4	**SOU** **+24**	PEN +10	**CRO** **+18**	WES −3	**CBY** **+10**	MAN +17	**EAS**; **0**	BAL +2	X	**ILA** **+12**	CAN +44	NOR +8	X	X	**CBY** **+11**	X	**CBY** **−1**
Western Suburbs Magpies	X	**MAN** **−20**	**EAS** **−38**	BAL −40	STG −12	**ILA** **+10**	CAN −32	**PAR** **−6**	NOR −2	**SOU** **+8**	PEN +9	**CRO** **−18**	**CBY** **−52**	X	MAN −24	EAS; 0	**BAL** **−6**	**STG** **+3**	ILA +12	**CAN**; **0**	PAR −38	**NOR** **−16**	SOU −8	**PEN** **−26**	CRO −26	CBY −28					
Team	1	2	3	4	5	6	7	8	9	10	11	12	13	14	15	16	17	18	19	20	21	22	23	24	25	26	F1	F2	F3	F4	GF

Bold – Home game
X – Bye
* – Extra time game
Opponent for round listed above margin

=== Ladder ===
Pos	Team	Pld	W	D	L	B	PF	PA	PD	Pts	Qualification
1	St. George Dragons	24	18	2	4	2	470	264	+206	42	Advance to finals series
2	Balmain Tigers	24	18	0	6	2	494	304	+190	40	Advance to finals series
3	Canterbury Bulldogs (P)	24	16	2	6	2	435	267	+168	38	Advance to finals series
4	Parramatta Eels	24	16	0	8	2	458	311	+147	36	Advance to finals series
5	Penrith Panthers	24	13	1	10	2	460	379	+81	31	Advance to playoff match
6	Manly Sea Eagles	24	13	1	10	2	404	345	+59	31	Advance to playoff match
7	Eastern Suburbs Roosters	24	10	3	11	2	374	389	−15	27	
8	Cronulla Sharks	24	11	0	13	2	440	404	+36	26	
9	South Sydney Rabbitohs	24	10	0	14	2	373	419	−46	24	
10	Canberra Raiders	24	8	2	14	2	432	534	−102	22	
11	North Sydney Bears	24	6	1	17	2	281	491	−210	17	
12	Western Suburbs Magpies	24	5	2	17	2	311	661	−350	16	
13	Illawarra Steelers	24	5	0	19	2	303	467	−164	14	

Source: RLP
(P) Premiers

=== Ladder progression ===
- Numbers highlighted in green indicate that the team finished the round inside the top 5.
- Numbers highlighted in blue indicates the team finished first on the ladder in that round.
- Numbers highlighted in red indicates the team finished last place on the ladder in that round.
- Underlined numbers indicate that the team had a bye during that round.

	Team	1	2	3	4	5	6	7	8	9	10	11	12	13	14	15	16	17	18	19	20	21	22	23	24	25	26
1	St. George Dragons	2	4	6	8	10	11	13	15	15	17	19	19	21	21	23	25	27	27	29	31	32	34	36	38	40	42
2	Balmain Tigers	2	4	6	8	8	8	8	10	12	14	16	18	20	22	24	24	26	28	30	32	34	34	36	38	38	40
3	Canterbury-Bankstown Bulldogs	2	4	4	5	7	8	10	12	12	14	14	14	16	18	20	22	24	24	24	26	28	30	32	34	36	38
4	Parramatta Eels	0	2	4	6	8	8	10	12	14	14	16	16	18	20	22	24	26	26	28	28	30	30	32	32	34	36
5	Penrith Panthers	2	2	2	2	4	6	8	10	12	14	14	16	16	18	18	18	20	22	22	23	23	25	27	29	29	31
6	Manly Warringah Sea Eagles	0	2	4	6	8	10	10	12	13	15	17	17	17	17	19	19	21	23	23	23	25	27	27	29	29	31
7	Eastern Suburbs Roosters	0	2	4	5	5	7	9	9	11	13	13	13	15	15	17	18	18	18	20	20	21	21	23	25	27	27
8	Cronulla-Sutherland Sharks	0	0	0	0	2	4	4	6	6	6	8	10	12	12	12	14	14	16	18	20	22	22	22	24	26	26
9	South Sydney Rabbitohs	2	2	2	2	2	2	4	4	6	6	8	10	10	12	12	12	12	14	14	16	18	20	22	22	24	24
10	Canberra Raiders	2	2	4	6	6	6	8	8	9	9	9	11	13	15	15	17	19	19	19	20	20	20	20	20	20	22
11	North Sydney Bears	0	2	2	2	4	6	6	6	8	8	8	10	10	10	10	10	10	12	14	15	15	17	17	17	17	17
12	Western Suburbs Magpies	2	2	2	2	2	4	4	4	4	6	8	8	8	10	10	11	11	13	15	16	16	16	16	16	16	16
13	Illawarra Steelers	0	0	2	4	4	4	4	4	4	4	4	6	6	6	8	10	10	10	10	10	10	12	12	12	14	14

== Finals ==
Home	Score	Away	Match Information
Home	Score	Away	Date and Time	Venue	Referee	Crowd
Playoff
Penrith Panthers	10–7	Manly-Warringah Sea Eagles	3 September 1985	Sydney Cricket Ground	Mick Stone	16,428
Qualifying Finals
Parramatta Eels	38–6	Penrith Panthers	7 September 1985	Sydney Cricket Ground	Kevin Roberts	18,939
Balmain Tigers	8–14	Canterbury-Bankstown Bulldogs	8 September 1985	Sydney Cricket Ground	Mick Stone	25,194
Semi-finals
Balmain Tigers	4–32	Parramatta Eels	14 September 1985	Sydney Cricket Ground	Kevin Roberts	25,423
St. George Dragons	17–6	Canterbury-Bankstown Bulldogs	15 September 1985	Sydney Cricket Ground	Mick Stone	39,013
Preliminary final
Canterbury-Bankstown Bulldogs	26–0	Parramatta Eels	22 September 1985	Sydney Cricket Ground	Kevin Roberts	34,915
Grand Final
St. George Dragons	6–7	Canterbury-Bankstown Bulldogs	29 September 1985	Sydney Cricket Ground	Kevin Roberts	44,569

=== Chart ===
Qualifying final
2	Balmain	8
3	Canterbury	14
4	Parramatta	38
5	Penrith	6

Major semi-final
1	St. George	17
Canterbury	6
Minor semi-final
Balmain	4
Parramatta	32

Preliminary final
Canterbury	26
Parramatta	0

Grand final
St. George	6
Canterbury	7

== Grand Final ==
1985 NSWRL Grand Final
- Cover of Big League match programme

St George Dragons	Canterbury-Bankstown Bulldogs
6	7
	1	2	Total
STG	0	6	6
CBY	6	1	7
- Date: 29 September 1985
- Stadium: Sydney Cricket Ground
- Location: Sydney
- Man of the Match: Steve Mortimer (CBY)
- Referee: Kevin Roberts
- Attendance: 44,569

Broadcast partners
- Broadcasters: ABC, Network 10
- Commentators: Jim Maxwell, Paul Vautin Debbie Spillane (sideline) (ABC); Ray Warren, Bill Anderson Graeme Hughes (sideline) (Network 10)

=== Teams ===
Aiming for back-to-back premierships, Canterbury-Bankstown's team featured 12 players who had played in the 1984 Grand Final, including replacements Mark Bugden and Greg Mullane. Michael Hagan replaced an injured Terry Lamb at five-eighth. The three Mortimer brothers and Steve Folkes also played in the 1979, 1980, 1984 and 1985 matches. St. George captain Craig Young, Steve Morris and Graeme Wynn had all played in the Dragons' 1979 premiership victory.

Team details
St. George		Position	Canterbury
Name	Number	Position	Number	Name
Glenn Burgess	1	FB	1	Michael Potter
Denis Kinchela	2	WG	2	Matthew Callinan
Michael O'Connor	3	CE	3	Andrew Farrar
Michael Beattie	4	CE	4	Chris Mortimer
Steve Morris	5	WG	5	Peter Mortimer
Steve Linnane	6	FE	14	Michael Hagan
Perry Haddock	7	HB	7	Steve Mortimer (c)
Pat Jarvis	13	PR	13	Peter Tunks
Phil Ritchie	12	HK	12	Billy Johnstone
Craig Young (c)	11	PF	11	Peter Kelly
Billy Noke	10	SR	10	Steve Folkes
Graeme Wynn	9	SR	9	Brian Battese
Graeme O'Grady	8	LK	8	Paul Langmack
Chris Guider	38	Replacement	15	David Gillespie
Stephen Funnell	23	Replacement	17	Mark Bugden
Chris Johns	17	Replacement	16	Greg Mullane
Alan Neil	20	Replacement
Roy Masters		Coach		Warren Ryan

=== Match details ===
The two teams had played twice during the regular season, playing out a 10-all draw at the Belmore Sports Ground in April, with St. George taking the return match 16–6 at the Sydney Cricket Ground in June. The teams met again in the major semi final, with the Dragons taking a 17–6 win to progress through the Grand Final. Canterbury then thrashed Parramatta 26–0 in the preliminary final to earn another grand final berth.

The match was played in sunny, albeit breezy conditions at the Sydney Cricket Ground before a crowd of 44,569.

St. George centre and goalkicker Michael O'Connor was injured in the first few minutes of the match and was in the hands of medical staff for a number of minutes before returning to his position. Canterbury's Steve Folkes was also struggling with a rib injury following the early exchanges. The Dragons had a few half-chances in the first ten minutes, but were unable to capitalise on the opportunities to score, while Canterbury centre Andrew Farrar was seen heading to the sidelines for treatment.

As the first half progressed with each team cancelling the other out, it would be Canterbury's tactical kicking game that continually put St. George fullback Glenn Burgess under the test of the high-ball in his in-goal area, which under the rules of the time, resulted in a line drop-out with the Bulldogs regaining possession.

Midway through the half, a penalty was awarded to Canterbury against St. George captain Craig Young for punching Farrar in a tackle. Opting to take a shot at opening the scoring, Farrar's kick from 39 metres from the posts on a slight angle missed.

The turning point of the first half came in the 27th minute of the match. After felling St George's Graeme Wynn as a scrum broke up, Canterbury prop forward Peter Kelly was surprising awarded a penalty by referee Kevin Roberts for a different infraction by the Dragons. Gifted field position, Canterbury went on the attack and shortly thereafter Kelly used the blindside to send winger Peter Mortimer over out wide on the Bulldogs right flank to open the scoring with a try. Farrar slotted the conversion attempt for a 6–0 lead, which held to half time after O'Connor missed a penalty goal attempt four minutes from the break.

After a quiet first half, Bulldogs halfback and skipper Steve Mortimer seized control of the match in the second half, as coach Warren Ryan sent on David Gillespie and Mark Bugden to replace Peter Tunks and Billy Johnstone. Winger Matthew Callinan won a contest against Burgess for a high-ball close to the Dragons line and crossed the tryline, only for referee Roberts to deny the try when he ruled Callinan was offside.

In the 57th minute Steve Morris produced a twisting run that beat three defenders only to lose the ball in a tackle just short of the Bulldogs line. The Dragons had another great opportunity to level the scores with just over 10 minutes remaining when Bulldogs fullback Michael Potter was forced into touch close to his own line. The pressure was relieved though when a kick from O'Connor bounced harmlessly into touch in goal.

From there Canterbury went forward set up for a field goal to clinch the match, which Farrar (despite missing an attempt earlier in the second half) had no trouble in kicking in the 72nd minute to take the score to 7–0. A last light of hope appeared for the Dragons when Morris found some space out wide to kick ahead for himself in a bit of individual brilliance to score, with O'Connor adding the two points to cut the lead to a single point with five minutes remaining. In the end though, a well-drilled and clinical approach from Canterbury shut out the Dragons with their defensive pressure. The Bulldogs able to smother the Dragons attack in the umbrella defensive structure.

Described as a "dour match which featured heavy defence," Canterbury coach Ryan said that his team maintained "cruel, ruthless control" over the contest. Although Ryan had led the Bulldogs to consecutive premierships, there was ongoing speculation that he would not be at the club the following season due to a rift with club management. Dragons coach Roy Masters, also embroiled in a bitter feud with Ryan, conceded that "the bottom line is they were too good. Their kicking game was excellent and they certainly had a lot of possession. When we did get the ball, we were too weary from so much tackling to be able to make any impression."

=== Scoreboard ===
1985 NSWRL Winfield Cup Grand Final

Sunday, 29 September
15:00 AEST (UTC+10)

St. George	6 – 7	Canterbury-Bankstown Bulldogs
Tries: 1 Morris 74'; Goals: 1 O'Connor 75' (1/2); Field goals: 0 Linnane (0/1)	1st: 0-6; 2nd: 6-1	Tries: 1 P Mortimer 29'; Goals: 1 Farrar 30' (1/2); Field goals: 1 Farrar 72' (1/2); S Mortimer (0/1)

Sydney Cricket Ground
Attendance: 44,569
Referee: Kevin Roberts
Player of the Match: Steve Mortimer

=== Other matches ===
St. George had teams in each of the three grand finals, winning the Under-23s decider 24–20 against Parramatta, and the reserve grade grand final 22–16 against the Canberra Raiders. The reserve grade premiership was won in the final seconds when Dragons fullback Alan Neil scored a try to break a 16-all deadlock.

Hooker Chris Guider became the first and only player to play in all three grand finals on the same day, starting in the Under-23s match before being used as a replacement in the reserve grade and first grade matches.

== Player statistics ==
The following statistics are as of the conclusion of Round 26.

Top 5 point scorers

Points	Player	Tries	Goals	Field goals
194	Dean Carney	11	75	0
192	Ross Conlon	4	88	0
184	Greg Alexander	13	65	2
178	Michael O'Connor	6	76	2
178	Mick Cronin	4	81	0

Top 5 try scorers

Tries	Player
16	Steve Linnane
14	Steve Ella
13	Greg Alexander
12	John Davidson
11	Ben Gonzales
11	Wayne Challis
11	Dean Carney
11	Les Biles
11	Craig Bellamy

Top 5 goal scorers

Goals	Player
88	Ross Conlon
81	Mick Cronin
77	Ron Giteau
76	Michael O'Connor
75	Dean Carney
