= Mortimer family (Australia) =

Rugby league family

The Mortimer brothers are a rugby league football family.

== First generation ==
Hailing from Wagga Wagga, New South Wales, Australia: Chris Mortimer, Peter Mortimer and Steve Mortimer. The brothers are best known for their relationship with the Canterbury-Bankstown Rugby League Football Club in the New South Wales Rugby League competition from the mid-1970s to the current day as players and administrators.

The three brothers played together in four grand finals for Canterbury and all represented New South Wales; Chris and Steve going on to represent Australia. All three Mortimer brothers are life members of the Canterbury-Bankstown Bulldogs Football Club. Chris and Steve are inductees into the Riverina Sporting Hall of Fame.

1979 Grand Final, all three brothers scored in a historic performance for the Mortimers.

A younger brother, Glen Mortimer played 27 first grade games for Cronulla between 1983 and 1987 after starting out in the Bulldogs lower grades.

== Second generation ==
Peter had five sons who all play rugby league. Daniel plays for the Gold Coast Titans and Robbie was contracted to the Balmain tigers and the Parramatta Eels in 2010/2011 before moving to Brisbane to play Queensland Cup for the Redcliffe Dolphins in the Intrust Super Cup. Daniel won an NRL Grand Final in 2013 and also a World Club Challenge in 2014.
