= Pat Jarvis =

Pat Jarvis is the name of:

- Pat Jarvis (rugby league) (born 1957), Australian rugby league footballer
- Pat Jarvis (baseball) (born 1941), American Major League Baseball player
