= Chris Guider =

Australian rugby league footballer

Personal information
- Full name: Christopher Guider
- Born: 9 March 1962 (age 64) Yass, New South Wales, AUstralia

Playing information
- Position: Hooker
Club
Years	Team	Pld	T	G	FG	P
1984–86	St. George Dragons	37	3	0	0	12
- Source: Whiticker/Hudson

Chris Guider (born 9 March 1962) is an Australian former rugby league footballer who played in the 1980s.

== Career ==
Originally from Tamworth, New South Wales, Guider joined the St. George Dragons in 1984 on a recommendation from former star center Robert Finch during a season playing with Maitland. A diminutive hooker, he is remembered as the only player to play in three grand finals on the same day in 1985, playing in the St. George Dragons Under-23s win over Parramatta Eels before being called as a replacement during the reserve grade grand final against Canberra Raiders in which St. George Dragons also won 24–20.

He was then used as a second-half replacement for Phil Ritchie during the first grade grand final. Guider went close of making it three premierships on the day, but St. George Dragons narrowly lost the first grade grand final 7–6 to the Canterbury-Bankstown Bulldogs.

Guider rose to captain the St. George Dragons on a number of occasions during 1986, but retired at the conclusion of that season.

== Scientology ==
Guider's departure from rugby was at least in part due to his involvement with Scientology. After leaving the Dragons, he eventually moved to the United States and began working directly for the organization's leader, David Miscavige, whom he later described as "violent and toxic". After leaving the church, Guider married fellow former Scientologist Valeska Paris.
