= Denis Kinchela =

Australian rugby league footballer

Personal information
- Full name: Denis Kinchela
- Born: c.1965 (age 60–61)

Playing information
- Position: Wing
Club
Years	Team	Pld	T	G	FG	P
1982–86	St. George Dragons	45	13	0	0	45
1987	Western Suburbs	3	0	0	0	0
	Total	48	13	0	0	45
- Source: Whiticker/Hudson

Denis Kinchela (born c. 1965) is an Australian former rugby league footballer who played in the 1980s.

== Playing career ==
Kinchela was graded by St George in 1982 as a seventeen year old and instantly made the first grade team as a winger in his debut year.

He played 21 games during 1982, but injuries cost him his first grade position until 1985 when he played on the wing for St George in the 1985 Grand Final.

He stayed at Saints for one final season in 1986, but in 1987 he moved to Western Suburbs to reignite his career, but the move was ultimately unsuccessful.
