= Daniel Mortimer =

Australian rugby league footballer

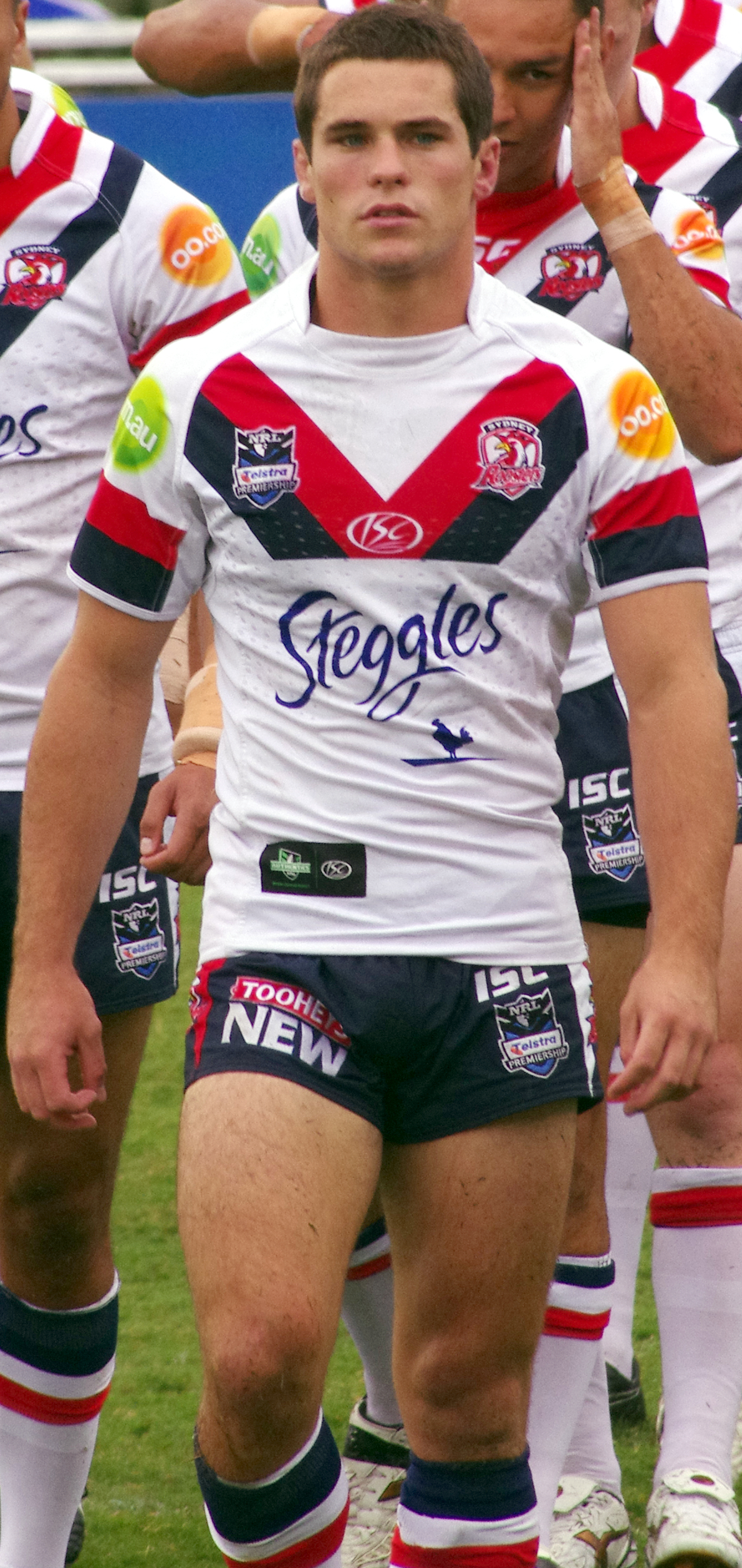

Personal information
- Born: 13 June 1989 (age 37) Sydney, Australia
- Height: 174 cm (5 ft 9 in)
- Weight: 84 kg (13 st 3 lb)

Playing information
- Position: Hooker, Five-eighth, Halfback
Club
| Years | Team | Pld | T | G | FG | P |
|---|---|---|---|---|---|---|
| 2009–11 | Parramatta Eels | 48 | 12 | 0 | 0 | 48 |
| 2012–14 | Sydney Roosters | 43 | 8 | 7 | 0 | 46 |
| 2014–16 | Gold Coast Titans | 35 | 1 | 3 | 0 | 10 |
| 2017 | Cronulla Sharks | 2 | 0 | 0 | 0 | 0 |
| 2017–18 | Leigh Centurions | 19 | 8 | 0 | 0 | 32 |
| | Total | 147 | 29 | 10 | 0 | 136 |
Representative
| Years | Team | Pld | T | G | FG | P |
| 2015 | Prime Minister's XIII | 1 | 0 | 0 | 0 | 0 |
- Source: As of 12 August 2018
- Father: Peter Mortimer
- Relatives: Chris Mortimer (uncle); Steve Mortimer (uncle); Glen Mortimer (uncle)

Daniel Mortimer (born 13 June 1989) is an Australian former professional rugby league footballer who last played as a hooker, scrum-half or stand-off for the Leigh Centurions in the Championship. He previously played for the Parramatta Eels, Gold Coast Titans, Sydney Roosters and the Cronulla-Sutherland Sharks. Mortimer was a Prime Minister's XIII representative and won the 2013 NRL Grand Final with the Roosters.

== Background ==
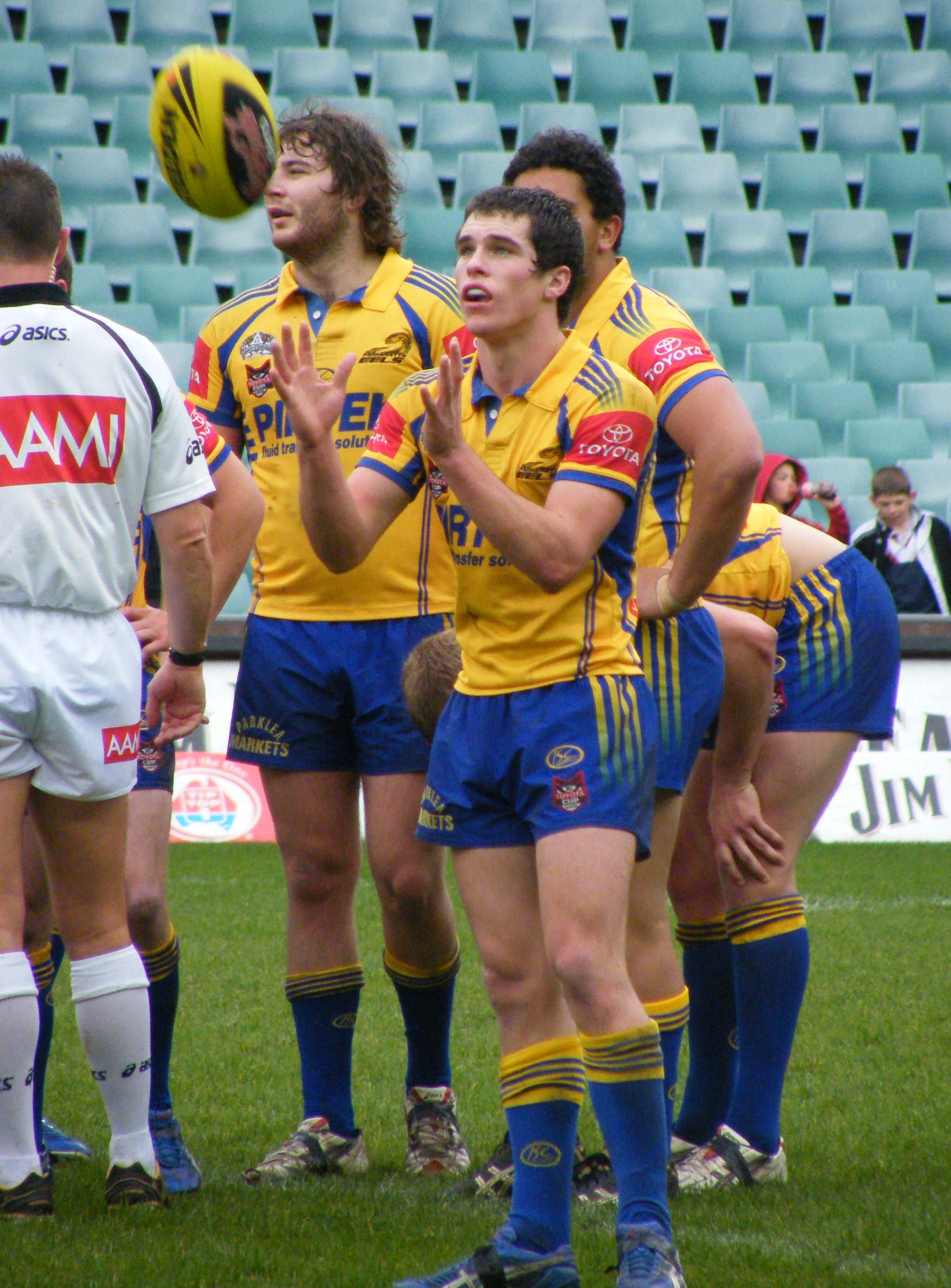
Mortimer playing for the Eels in 2008.

Born in Sydney, Mortimer attended James Sheahan Catholic High School while playing his junior football for Orange CYMS before being signed by the Parramatta Eels. Mortimer played for the Eels NYC team in 2008 and 2009. In 2007, Mortimer played for the New South Wales Combined Catholic Schools team and Australian Schoolboys.

Mortimer is of English descent, the son of former Canterbury-Bankstown Bulldogs player Peter Mortimer and the nephew of former Bulldogs players Steve Mortimer and Chris Mortimer and Cronulla-Sutherland Sharks player Glen Mortimer.

== Playing career ==
=== 2009 ===
In Round 12, Mortimer made his NRL debut for the Eels against the Cronulla-Sutherland Sharks at five-eighth in the Eels 13–10 loss at Parramatta Stadium. In Round 16 against the Brisbane Broncos, Mortimer scored his first NRL career try in the Eels 21–14 win at Parramatta Stadium. Mortimer went on to score 10 tries from 18 games in his rookie season, helping the Eels to make it to the 2009 NRL Grand Final in a late season surge, playing at five-eighth against the Melbourne Storm in the Eels 23–16 loss.

In 2018, Mortimer recalled his memories of the 2009 grand final saying "It was a whirlwind, it was surreal. It feels like a movie I watched. I don't think we've seen a team do that since, to be so far out of the eight then to go on to the grand final, it was an absolute buzz, something I'm so thankful I was a part of it".

=== 2010 ===
In 2010, after a lacklustre start to the season, Mortimer reflected on 2009 saying, "We hit form that not many teams have done in the history of footy, so to be judged on that's pretty harsh". Mortimer finished the 2010 NRL season with him playing in 21 matches and scoring 2 tries for the Parramatta Eels. During the 2010 season, Mortimer was reportedly offered $500,000 a season to join rivals Canterbury where is father Peter Mortimer played but turned down the offer to remain at Parramatta until the end of the 2012 season.

=== 2011 ===
Mortimer played in 9 matches for the Parramatta Eels in the 2011 NRL season after spending most of the season in the New South Wales Cup for the Wentworthville Magpies after the Eels Round 10 match against the North Queensland Cowboys where they lost 40–26 at 1300SMILES Stadium. In October 2011, Mortimer signed a 2-year contract with the Sydney Roosters starting in 2012.

=== 2012 ===
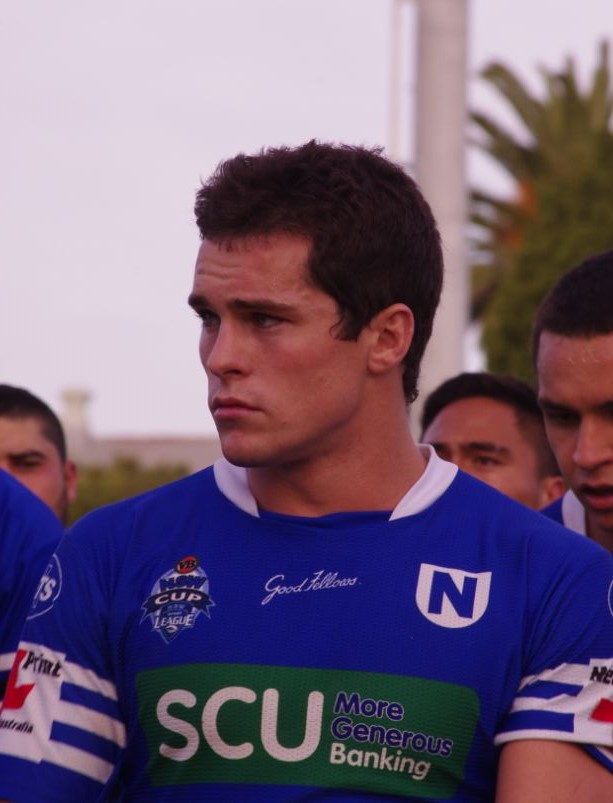
Mortimer playing for the Newtown Jets in 2012

In Round 1 of the 2012 NRL season, Mortimer made his club debut for the Sydney Roosters against the South Sydney Rabbitohs at five-eighth in the Roosters last minute 24–20 win at ANZ Stadium. In Round 3 against the Canberra Raiders, Mortimer scored his first club try for the Roosters in the 14–8 win at SFS. Mortimer played in 8 matches, scored 2 tries and kicked 5 goals for the Sydney Roosters in the 2012 NRL season. On 30 September 2012, Mortimer captained the Newtown Jets for the 2012 New South Wales Cup Grand Final against the Balmain Ryde-Eastwood Tigers, playing at halfback in the Jets 22–18 win.

=== 2013 ===
On 7 May 2013, Mortimer re-signed with the Roosters on a 2-year contract. On 6 October 2013, Mortimer played in the Sydney Roosters 2013 NRL Grand Final team against the Manly-Warringah Sea Eagles off the interchange bench in the Roosters Grand Final 26–18 win. Mortimer finished the 2013 NRL season with him playing in all of the Roosters 27 matches, scoring 5 tries and kicking 2 goals.

=== 2014 ===
On 22 February 2014, Mortimer played in the Sydney Roosters 2014 World Club Challenge 36–14 win over the Wigan Warriors at SFS. On 17 June 2014, Mortimer joined the Gold Coast Titans mid-season on a 2 1/2-year contract. Mortimer played in 7 matches and scored 1 try for the Sydney Roosters before moving to the Gold Coast.

In Round 15 of the 2014 NRL season against the St George Illawarra Dragons, Mortimer made his club debut for the Gold Coast Titans, kicking a goal in the Titans 19–18 loss at Cbus Super Stadium. In Round 24 against the Dragons, Mortimer played his 100th NRL career match in the Titans 34–6 loss at Jubilee Oval. Mortimer finished off his mid-season transfer year with the Titans with him playing in 11 matches and kicking a goal.

=== 2015 ===
On 31 January and 1 February, Mortimer played for the Titans in the 2015 NRL Auckland Nines. He finished off the 2015 season having played in 17 matches and kicking 2 goals for the Titans. On 26 September, he played for the Prime Minister's XIII against Papua New Guinea, playing off the interchange bench in his team's 40–12 win in Port Moresby.

=== 2016 ===
On 29 January 2016, Mortimer was named in the Titans 2016 Auckland Nines squad. Mortimer was also named captain of the Titans for the tournament. In Round 3 against the Wests Tigers, Mortimer scored his first club try for the Titans in their 30–18 win at Cbus Super Stadium. After sustaining a hamstring injury and the signing of Nathan Peats from the Parramatta Eels, Mortimer struggled to break into the Titans first 17 squad. Mortimer finished the 2016 NRL season with him playing in 7 matches and scoring 1 try for the Titans. On 5 November 2016, Mortimer signed with the Cronulla-Sutherland Sharks as being one of the potential replacements for the recently retired Michael Ennis at Hooker.

=== 2017 ===
He only played twice for the Sharks when in late June, he moved to England to play for then Super League side Leigh Centurions playing his first game on 7 July against Warrington Wolves.

=== 2018 ===
On 11 November, Mortimer announced his retirement from rugby league at just the age of 29. Mortimer wrote on Instagram "I've been so damn lucky to live my dream. It has been an amazing ride. Cannot wait until the next chapter ... whatever that may be". Mortimer played 2019 season with Gold Coast club Currumbin Eagles in the A grade division.

== Personal life ==
As of 2019, Mortimer has become a teacher at Pimpama State Secondary College (PSSC), Queensland, Australia.

== See also ==
- Mortimer family (Australia)
