= Les Biles =

Australian rugby league player (born 1962)

Personal information
- Full name: Lester Biles
- Born: 24 September 1962 (age 62)

Playing information
- Position: Wing
Club
Years	Team	Pld	T	G	FG	P
1983–87	South Sydney	54	14	0	0	56

Lester Biles (born 24 September 1962) is an Indigenous Australian former rugby league player for South Sydney.

Known as "Lester Q", Biles played on the wing for South Sydney during the 1980s. He had his standout year in 1985 with a club-high 11 tries, which was the only season he scored more than one try.
