= Glenn Burgess =

Australian rugby league footballer

Personal information
- Full name: Glenn Burgess
- Born: 17 November 1963 (age 62) Canterbury, New South Wales

Playing information
- Height: 180 cm (5 ft 11 in)
- Weight: 80 kg (12 st 8 lb)
- Position: Fullback
Club
Years	Team	Pld	T	G	FG	P
1983–87	St George	61	10	0	0	40
1988–89	Gold Coast	11	1	0	0	4
	Total	72	11	0	0	44

Glenn Burgess (born 17 November 1963) is an Australian former professional rugby league footballer who played in the 1980s.

== Playing career ==
Burgess was graded by the St George Dragons from the local junior club Penshurst RSL in 1981. He debuted in first grade with the Dragons in 1983, but did not become a regular in the top grade until Brian Johnson suffered a serious back injury in the opening game of 1985. Burgess took over and played so well that Johnson played almost entirely in reserve grade when his fitness returned. Burgess played fullback in the 1985 Grand Final where he was tested repeatedly by the Canterbury kickers, but after another good season in 1986 he fell off in 1987 and fluctuated between first and reserve grades.

Burgess was a talented player and was known for his expertise at catching towering high balls from opposition kickers. He played 61 first grade games for the Dragons before finishing his career at the Gold Coast.
