= Perry Haddock =

Australian rugby league footballer

Personal information
- Full name: Perry Haddock
- Born: 20 April 1959 (age 67) Erina, New South Wales, Australia

Playing information
- Height: 167 cm (5 ft 6 in)
- Position: Halfback
Club
Years	Team	Pld	T	G	FG	P
1981–83	Cronulla Sharks	44	12	3	0	43
1984–86	St. George	58	12	0	1	49
1987–88	Illawarra Steelers	36	6	0	1	25
1989	St. George	1	0	0	0	0
	Total	139	30	3	2	117

Perry Haddock (born 20 April 1959) is an Australian former rugby league footballer who played in the 1980s.

== Professional career ==
Originally from Erina, New South Wales, Perry Haddock was a halfback for three clubs during his eight-year career. He played three seasons with the Cronulla-Sutherland Sharks between 1981 and 1983, then switched to the St. George Dragons for three seasons between 1984 and 1986. He starred for Dragons during this period, and he played in the 1985 Grand Final.

In 1987, Haddock switched clubs again, this time to the Illawarra Steelers and stayed for two seasons.

Perry Haddock was one of the shortest halfbacks in modern day rugby league, standing at 1.67 metres, but he is remembered as one of the great club halfbacks of his era.

== After retirement ==
Haddock coached the Dragons Jersey Flegg Cup team in the early 1990s. It was during this time that he developed Oztag.
