= Steve Linnane =

Australian RL coach and former rugby league footballer

Personal information
- Born: 5 March 1965 (age 61) Sydney, New South Wales, Australia

Playing information
- Position: Halfback
Club
Years	Team	Pld	T	G	FG	P
1984–90	St. George Dragons	100	23	0	19	111
1991	Newcastle Knights	18	2	0	0	8
	Total	118	25	0	19	119

Coaching information
Club
Years	Team	Gms	W	D	L	W%
1999–00	Rochdale Hornets	31	12	0	19	39
2001–02	Halifax Blue Sox	30	10	0	20	33
2002–04	Hull Kingston Rovers	35	21	0	14	60
	Total	96	43	0	53	45
- Source: As of 16 June 2026
- Relatives: Mark Kheirallah (nephew)

Steve Linnane (born 5 March 1965) is an Australian former rugby league player who played in the 1980s and 1990s, and coached in the 2000s. After playing club football in the Winfield Cup for the St. George Dragons and the Newcastle Knights, he moved to England where he became coach of Super League clubs Halifax Blue Sox and Hull Kingston Rovers.

== Playing career ==
As a young halfback, Linnane was signed to the St. George Dragons in 1985. He was named Dally M Rookie of the year and was also the 1985 NSWRL season's top try scorer with 16 tries. Also playing in that year's Grand Final, he narrowly missed out on a premiership in his debut season as the Bulldogs beat the Dragons by just one point.

In 1987 Linnane was suspended for 20 weeks by the NSWRL judiciary for eye gouging Penrith Panthers's Greg Alexander. He stayed with the St. George Dragons until 1990 when he was sacked as a disciplinary action, then moved to the Newcastle Knights for the 1991 NSWRL season. During the 1992 Great Britain Lions tour of Australasia Linnane was selected to play for the Country New South Wales team against the tourists.

== Coaching career ==
Linnane was later player-coach with Kurri Kurri from 1992 to 1996 before retiring as player in 1996. He was assistant coach at the Newcastle Knights to Mal Reilly and Warren Ryan from 1997 to 1999, and then became head coach at English club the Rochdale Hornets in December 1999. He quit in June 2000 to join the Super League club, Halifax Blue Sox as assistant coach to Gary Mercer. Following Mercer's resignation in 2001 he was in temporary charge but was later appointed head coach of Halifax Blue Sox on a two-year contract. He was sacked in August 2002, the morning after a 64–0 loss to St. Helens which came after nine losses from ten games which put the club at risk of relegation. Linnane then became Hull Kingston Rovers' first overseas coach. Under him, the club came within eighty minutes of their first grand final appearance in 2002, after a largely successful end to the season. In 2004 he resigned.
