= Matthew Callinan =

Australian rugby league footballer

Personal information
- Full name: Matthew Callinan
- Born: 27 April 1964 (age 62) Wingham, New South Wales, Australia

Playing information
- Position: Wing
Club
Years	Team	Pld	T	G	FG	P
1985–86	Canterbury Bulldogs	12	6	0	0	24
- Source: As of 14 February 2024

Matthew Callinan is an Australian former professional rugby league footballer who played in the 1980s. He played for Canterbury-Bankstown in the NSWRL competition.

== Playing career ==
Callinan was originally from the town of Wingham and signed for Canterbury in the 1985 NSWRL season. Callinan made his first-grade debut for Canterbury in round 14 against Cronulla at Shark Park.

Despite playing only three first-grade games, Callinan was selected for Canterbury in their major semi-final against St. George, which Canterbury lost 17–6, with Callinan scoring a try. The following week, Callinan starred in Canterbury's 26–0 victory over arch-rivals Parramatta, scoring two tries. Callinan was retained on the wing for the 1985 NSWRL grand finale against St. George, which Canterbury won 7-6, claiming their 5th premiership. The following season, Callinan only played six matches for Canterbury and was released at the end of the season.
