= Stephen Funnell =

Australian rugby league footballer

Steve Funnell
Personal information
- Full name: Stephen Ronald Funnell
- Born: 28 November 1965 (age 60) Kogarah, New South Wales, Australia

Playing information
- Position: Fullback
Club
| Years | Team | Pld | T | G | FG | P |
|---|---|---|---|---|---|---|
| 1984–88 | St. George Dragons | 45 | 8 | 18 | 1 | 69 |
| 1989 | Western Suburbs | 4 | 0 | 0 | 0 | 0 |
| 1992 | Eastern Suburbs | 1 | 1 | 2 | 0 | 8 |
| | Total | 50 | 9 | 20 | 1 | 77 |

Steve Funnell (born 28 November 1965) is an Australian former rugby league footballer who played in the 1980s and 1990s.

== Playing career ==
A former Saints junior, Funnell was a fullback for St. George for five seasons between 1984 and 1988. He was a reserve in the 1985 Grand Final but didn't retain a first grade spot on a regular basis during his time at the Dragons.

Funnell decided to change clubs in 1989, joining Western Suburbs, and finished his career at Eastern Suburbs in 1992.

Funnell captain-coached Adelong-Batlow to the 1996 Group 9 premiership.
