= Steve Mortimer =

Australia international rugby league footballer

Steve Mortimer OAM
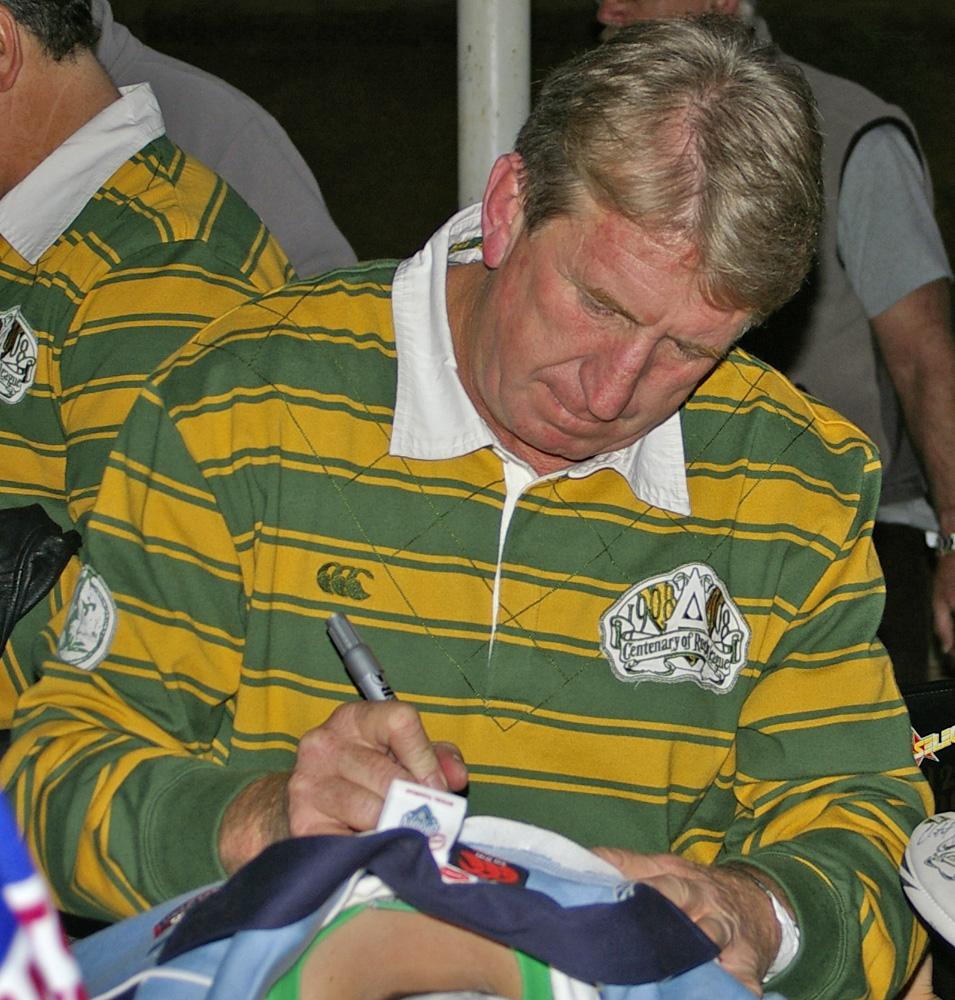
- Mortimer in 2008

Personal information
- Full name: Stephen Charles Mortimer
- Born: 15 July 1956 (age 70) Yagoona, New South Wales, Australia

Playing information
- Height: 5 ft 8 in (1.73 m)
- Weight: 12 st 4 lb (78 kg)
- Position: Halfback
Club
Years	Team	Pld	T	G	FG	P
1976–88	Canterbury-Bankstown	272	79	0	5	270
Representative
Years	Team	Pld	T	G	FG	P
1977–85	New South Wales	16	3	0	0	11
1981–84	Australia	9	2	0	0	6
1985	Country Origin	1	0	0	0	0
- Relatives: Peter Mortimer (brother); Chris Mortimer (brother); Glen Mortimer (brother); Daniel Mortimer (nephew)

Stephen Charles Mortimer (born 15 July 1956), also nicknamed "Turvey", is an Australian former rugby league footballer who played as a halfback. Mortimer played a Canterbury-Bankstown Bulldogs club record 272 first-grade games between 1976 and 1988, winning four premierships with the club during the 1980s. Mortimer's two younger brothers, Peter and Chris, also played for the club.

== Background ==
Mortimer was born in the Sydney suburb of Yagoona and raised in Wagga Wagga, New South Wales, the eldest son of Ian and Elaine Mortimer's four sons. His brothers (Peter, Chris, and Glen) also played rugby league and were famously known as the Mortimer brothers.

Mortimer's junior club was the Kooringal Magpies. He then played for Wagga Wagga's Turvey Park club, with "Turvey" becoming one of Mortimer's nicknames.

== Playing career ==
Spotted by Peter "The Bullfrog" Moore, when playing for Riverina in the 1975 Amco Cup, Mortimer tore his future club Canterbury-Bankstown Bulldogs to pieces and was Man of the Match despite Riverina losing. 'Bullfrog', when asked about Mortimer's performance uttered the words "will never play against Canterbury-Bankstown ever again", and true to Bullfrog's word he never did. Mortimer captained Canterbury to Premierships in 1984 and 1985 and was a member of the 1980 and 1988 triumphs.

His performances in the 1980 and 1985 victories were vintage Mortimer. In the 1980 decider, he saved three certain Eastern Suburbs tries through superb cover tackles (a great Mortimer trademark). In the 1985 Grand Final it was Mortimer's captaincy and direction that controlled Canterbury field position and possession as they buried St George into submission following a try to brother Peter Mortimer in the 29th minute. Mortimer captained Canterbury to a narrow loss in the 1986 Grand Final, which Parramatta won 4–2 in a tryless game, and also played in the 1979 Grand Final loss to St George.

During Mortimer's final five seasons at Canterbury-Bankstown he formed a great halves combination with the master of support play in Terry Lamb. During their five years together in the blue and white, the Bulldogs made four Grand Finals and won three of them. Lamb was a non-playing reserve in the 1985 Grand Final win over St George after being ruled out due to injury, and Mortimer missed 68 minutes of the 1988 Grand Final win over Balmain in the first Grand Final played at the Sydney Football Stadium (Turvey had broken his arm during the Bulldogs Round 21 match against St George at Belmore, but recovered sufficiently to take his place in Phil Gould's side on GF day).

Lamb would later captain the Bulldogs between 1990 and 1995 and usher in a new breed of Bulldogs that weren't around in the Mortimer era. Mortimer received an offer to switch clubs in 1987 and very nearly joined the Bob Fulton coached Manly-Warringah Sea Eagles, but stayed put at Canterbury (Manly won the premiership that year while the Bulldogs finished only 1 point out of the finals). He was advised to retire after 1988 rather than join another club, which ensured his status as one of the most loyal players to play the game of rugby league.

Surprisingly, despite their success when playing together at Canterbury, Mortimer and Lamb only ever partnered each other once in the halves for New South Wales. This was in Game 2 of the 1984 State of Origin series on a very wet and muddy Sydney Cricket Ground (SCG), with Queensland winning 14–2. They never got the chance to play together for Australia as Queensland captain Wally Lewis was the test five-eighth and also test captain from 1984.

Despite troubles at Canterbury during his latter years, including a well publicised feud with Warren Ryan who coached the team from 1984 to 1987, Mortimer was a one-club man and retired playing 272 first grade games, which at the time was the most for one NSWRL club. It was also around this time that when appearing before the NSWRL Judiciary, the chairman of the judiciary, Sydney lawyer Jim Comans who was leading the campaign to stamp out violence in the game, told Mortimer that if he appeared before him again "Rugby league will be just a memory for you".'.

Mortimer's representative career faced challenges from other great halfbacks of his era including Tommy Raudonikis, Steve Morris, Kevin Hastings and most notably Peter Sterling.

Despite the presence of great halfbacks, Mortimer played 16 matches for New South Wales between 1977 and 1985, including nine under the State of Origin banner. Mortimer captained the Blues in 1984/85 in three matches (all victories) and was the first captain to lead New South Wales to State of Origin success in 1985. He was also named man-of-the-match in the final game of the 1984 State of Origin series at Brisbane's Lang Park. Mortimer is credited as the player who finally brought passion into the Blues Origin jersey and led a new wave of NSW players that would be the core of the team for many years to come including those such as Wayne Pearce, Brett Kenny, Michael O'Connor, Garry Jack, Royce Simmons, Steve Roach, Noel Cleal, Ben Elias, and his brother Chris Mortimer.

Mortimer played 8 Test matches for Australia between 1981 and 1984 where he scored two tries in his Test debut against France at the SCG with Australia winning 43–2. Also making his debut in that Test match was future rugby league immortal Wally Lewis, who played outside Mortimer at five-eighth. Between 1980 and 1985, the breakdown of appearances for halfbacks at Test level was Steve Mortimer 8 Tests, Peter Sterling (Parramatta) 6 Tests, Mark Murray (Qld) 6 Tests and Des Hasler (Manly-Warringah) 1 Test. Mortimer was named vice-captain of Australia's 1985 mid-season tour of New Zealand, but made himself unavailable due to business reasons, with Murray and Hasler sharing the halfback position. Mortimer later regretted standing down as a major conflict erupted between coach Terry Fearnley and captain Wally Lewis. Fearnley was NSW coach in 1985 and Mortimer previously played alongside Lewis in Test and Kangaroo Tour campaigns (Mortimer and Lewis were room-mates on the undefeated 1982 Kangaroo tour where both actually lost their test spot to Sterling and Brett Kenny). He believed that had he toured New Zealand he might have been able to calm the situation between the coach and the captain.

== Coaching career ==
Mortimer played under four coaches during his 13 seasons at Canterbury. Coaches Malcolm Clift and Ted Glossop encouraged him to develop his personal style of playing, while Warren Ryan often clashed with Mortimer. Despite this, they went on to win two Premierships and a runner-up during Ryan's four years at Canterbury from 1984-87. Mortimer was captain for this entire period except the first half of the 1984 season. Mortimer's performance in the 1985 Grand Final against the St. George Dragons showcased the success of their working relationship, with the Mortimer's ingoal bombs an execution of Ryan's coaching.

Mortimer's final year at Canterbury was under the coaching of Phil Gould where he stood down from the captaincy after Round 5. Mortimer's performances on the field were vintage but a virus and broken wrist cut his appearances down to 14. He also played 5 games as a fresh replacement. For the first time, the NSWRL allowed teams outside of semi-finals to have fresh reserves for club matches and Gould utilised Mortimer when he recovered from the virus to great effect, including his only match against Allan Langer, where in 31 minutes Mortimer flipped a club match against Brisbane Broncos win Man of the Match. He broke his wrist in the penultimate round but was fit enough to be a reserve in the Grand Final victory against Balmain Tigers.

== Administration ==
The Bulldogs' salary cap crisis in 2002 saw Mortimer return to the club to save them from trouble. He led from the front with the passion and dedication he displayed on the field. The Bulldogs emerged from the dramas with flying colours for the 2003 season. They fell one game short of the Grand Final but the signs were there for a big 2004. Further dramas in the pre-season saw Mortimer stand down as chief executive officer but the foundations he put in place and the players he helped recruit saw Canterbury under the coaching of Steve Folkes win their 8th Premiership.

== Outside football ==
In 1988, Mortimer was awarded the Order of Australia Medal (OAM) for his services to rugby league.

Mortimer, after his playing days, set up a very successful "Shuffleboard" business, which focused on a game used mostly by 'retirement homes'. He has made several media appearances and was a member of Channel Seven's Sports World programme in the early 1990s and Fox Sports NRL coverage. From 2005, he was regularly seen on Sky News as their rugby league expert.

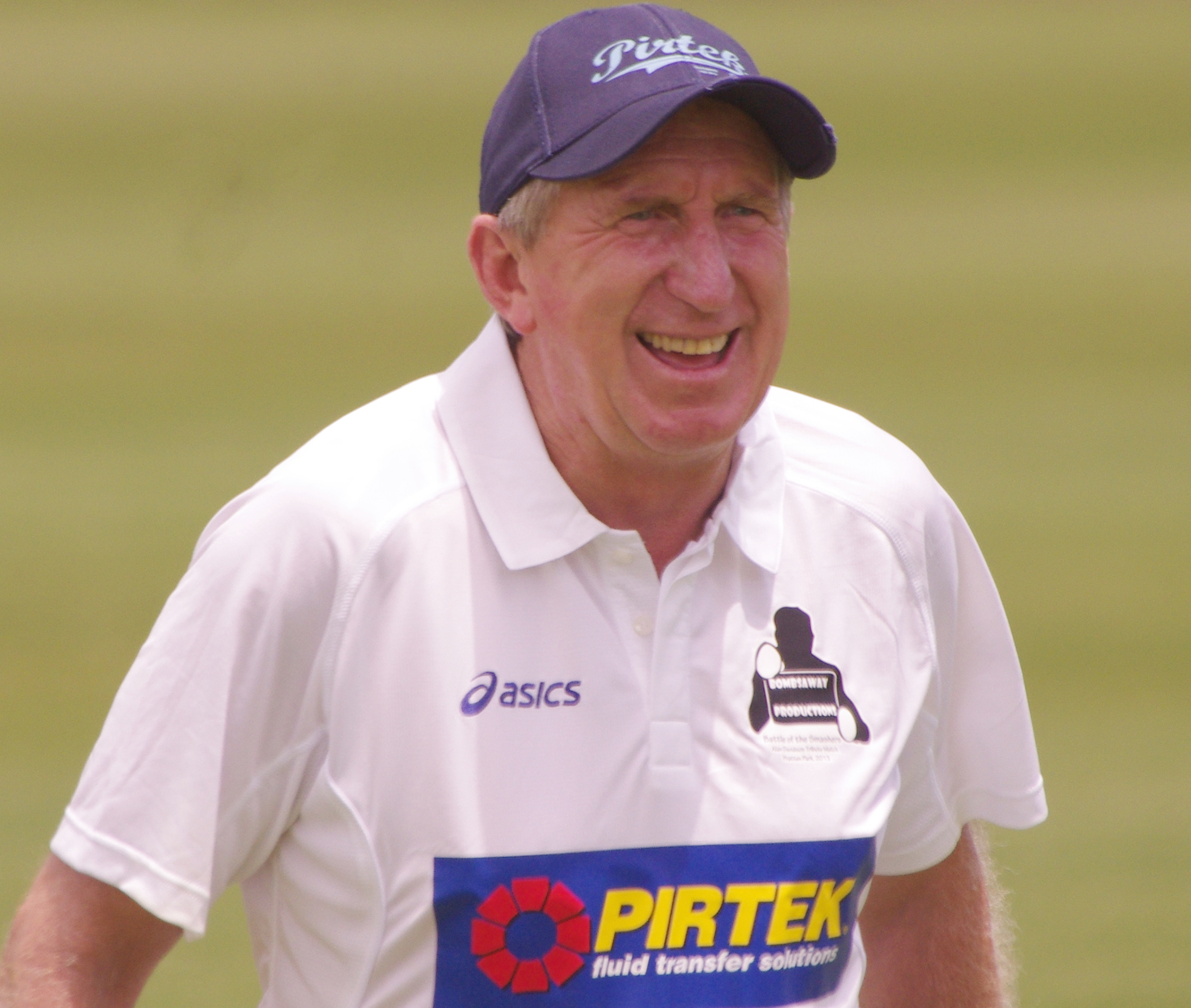
Mortimer in 2014

On 24 October 2000, Mortimer was recipient of the Australian Sports Medal.

In February 2008, Mortimer was named in the list of Australia's 100 Greatest Players (1908–2007) which was commissioned by the NRL and ARL to celebrate the code's centenary year in Australia.

== Personal life ==
Mortimer and his wife Karen Mortimer have three children; son Matthew Mortimer, son Andrew Mortimer, and daughter Erin Mortimer.

=== Health ===
In 2021, Mortimer was diagnosed with dementia. In November 2021, he was hospitalised after having a heart attack and pneumonia the following month. In January 2022, he was hospitalised for bronchitis and was sent to a care home the following month due to his dementia.
