= Glen Mortimer =

Australian rugby league footballer

Personal information
- Born: Wagga Wagga, New South Wales

Playing information
- Position: Five-eighth, Centre, Second-row
Club
Years	Team	Pld	T	G	FG	P
1983–87	Cronulla Sharks	28	3	0	0	12
- Source: As of 27 June 2019
- Relatives: Peter Mortimer (brother); Chris Mortimer (brother); Steve Mortimer (brother); Daniel Mortimer (nephew)

Glen Mortimer is an Australian former professional rugby league footballer who played for Cronulla Sharks. He is also the brother to Chris Mortimer, Peter Mortimer and Steve Mortimer. The brothers were all raised in the Riverina city of Wagga Wagga, New South Wales.

He started in the lower grades at Canterbury before moving to Cronulla.

== See also ==
- Glen Mortimer at RLP
