= Phil Ritchie (rugby league) =

Australian rugby league footballer (born 1959)

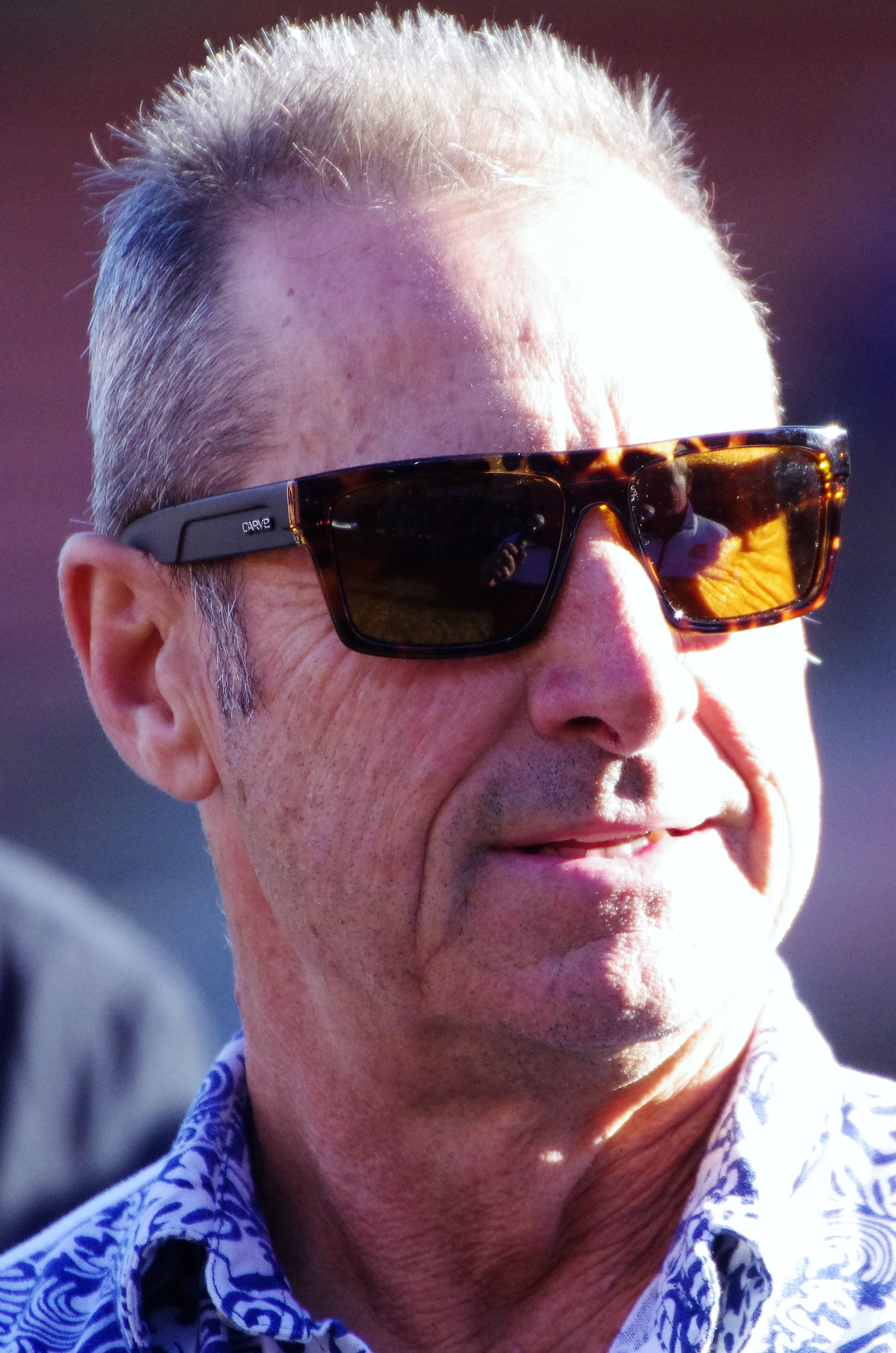

Personal information
- Full name: Phillip Ritchie
- Born: 2 June 1959 (age 67)

Playing information
- Position: Hooker
Club
Years	Team	Pld	T	G	FG	P
1981–84	North Sydney	46	1	0	0	4
1985–86	St. George Dragons	19	0	0	0	0
	Total	65	1	0	0	4

Phil Ritchie (born 1959) is an Australian former rugby league footballer who played in the 1980s.

== Playing career ==
Ritchie began his career at North Sydney and played four seasons with the club between 1981 and 1984. He then transferred to the St. George Dragons in 1985 and played Hooker in their 1985 Grand Final team that was defeated 7–6 by Canterbury-Bankstown Bulldogs. He retired at the conclusion on the 1986 season.
