= Mark Bugden =

Australian rugby league footballer

Personal information
- Full name: Mark Bugden
- Born: 8 December 1961 (age 64) Newtown, New South Wales, Australia

Playing information
- Position: Hooker
Club
Years	Team	Pld	T	G	FG	P
1981–83	Newtown	34	7	0	0	24
1984–88	Canterbury Bulldogs	63	4	0	0	16
1989–90	Parramatta	22	4	0	0	16
	Total	119	15	0	0	56
- Relatives: Geoff Bugden (brother)

Mark Bugden (born 8 December 1961), nicknamed "Buggo", is an Australian former professional rugby league footballer who primarily played as a hooker. The teams he played for at a club level were: the Newtown Jets (1981−83), the Canterbury-Bankstown Bulldogs (1984−88), and the Parramatta Eels (1989−90).

== Background ==
Bugden was born in Newtown, New South Wales and was a Newtown junior with the Marrickville RSL Club.

== Playing career ==
Bugden made his first grade debut for Newtown in round 22 of the 1981 season against St. George scoring two tries in a 20–11 victory at Kogarah Oval. In 1983, Bugden played 24 games for Newtown including their last ever match in the NSWRL competition against Canberra at Campbelltown Stadium with Newtown winning 9–6. In 1984, Bugden signed for Canterbury. Bugden scored the winning try for Canterbury in their 6-4 Grand Final victory over Parramatta that season. In 1985 he was suspended for 14 weeks for his high tackle on Steve Rogers (which resulted in litigation) and could not regain his first grade spot for the 1985 grand final. In 1986, Bugden played in Canterbury's 1986 Grand Final loss against Parramatta. He was a fresh reserve for Canterbury in their 24–12 win over the Balmain Tigers in the 1988 Grand Final under the coaching of Phil Gould. In 1989, Bugden joined Canterbury's arch-rivals Parramatta where he played two seasons. Bugden is the younger brother of former Newtown and Parramatta player and New South Wales front row forward Geoff Bugden.

== Post playing ==
After retirement, Bugden became a police officer. In June 2005, Bugden was dismissed from the NSW Police Service for gross misconduct.
