= Pat Jarvis (rugby league) =

Australia international rugby league footballer

Personal information
- Full name: Pat Jarvis
- Born: 24 March 1957 (age 69) Sydney, New South Wales, Australia

Playing information
- Position: Prop
Club
Years	Team	Pld	T	G	FG	P
1980–86	St George	121	7	0	0	27
1986–86	St. Helens	18	2	0	0	8
1987	Canterbury-Bankstown	12	0	0	0	0
1988–89	Eastern Suburbs	37	0	0	0	0
1990–91	North Sydney Bears	44	3	0	0	12
	Total	232	12	0	0	47
Representative
Years	Team	Pld	T	G	FG	P
1984–87	New South Wales	8	0	0	0	0
1983	Australia	1	0	0	0	0

Pat Jarvis is an Australian former rugby league footballer, a state and national representative front-row forward.

== Early life ==
Pat Jarvis was born on 24 March 1957 and grew up in Arncliffe.

Jarvis attended St Francis Xavier's School before moving to Kingsgrove's De La Salle College and finished his Higher School Certificate at Bankstown's Benilde High School.

Jarvis spent five years in the transport industry coordinating between shipping and air freight, general cargo, container work and local and interstate logistics before joining the NSW Police Force in 1978, working as a policeman on the streets of Newtown for five years. The next three years, he worked with the Newtown Police Youth Club before retiring from the police force.

== Club career ==
His sixteen-year club career was played at four Sydney clubs New South Wales Rugby League premiership – the St. George Dragons, Canterbury Bulldogs, Eastern Suburbs Roosters and North Sydney Bears.

Jarvis was an avid Rugby League player in the Juniors for Arncliffe Scots, and was graded with the St George Dragons in 1976, playing eleven seasons with that club as a forward. He played in the 1985 Grand Final for the Dragons, and remained with the club until the end of the 1986 season.

Jarvis then spent a year in Britain, playing with St Helens R.F.C. in 1986–87.

When Pat returned to Sydney in 1987, he joined Canterbury and went on to regain his State of Origin jersey. However, Jarvis was injured during the middle of the season and a full knee reconstruction meant he missed the second half.

In 1988, Pat joined Eastern Suburbs and played thirty-seven games for the Rooseters in the next two seasons. Although not back to his best yet, Pat was awarded Clubman of the Year in 1989. In 1990, he joined North Sydney and played 44 games for the Bears in 1990 and 1991. Jarvis was later captain-coach of Mudgee.

== Representative career ==
Jarvis debuted for the New South Wales Blues in State of Origin for game I of 1984 and played all three matches that year and in 1985 with two later appearances in 1987, a total of 8 State of Origin matches.

His only Australian representative appearance was a Test match on the 1983 tour of New Zealand.

In 2008, Rugby League's Centennial Year in Australia, Jarvis was named in the NSW Police Team of the Century.

== Drug Free Ambassador career ==
Jarvis has been a Drug Free Ambassador for ten years, and is a very keen supporter of the "Say No To Drugs" program, which is an initiative of the Church of Scientology.
