= Ross Conlon =

Australia international rugby league footballer

Personal information
- Born: 29 March 1959 (age 67) Murwillumbah, New South Wales, Australia

Playing information
- Position: Centre, Wing
Club
Years	Team	Pld	T	G	FG	P
1981–82	Western Suburbs	34	12	56	0	148
1983–84	Canterbury	38	9	120	0	276
1985–88	Balmain Tigers	98	15	348	0	756
1985–86	St. Helens	16	9	65	0	166
	Total	186	45	589	0	1346
Representative
Years	Team	Pld	T	G	FG	P
1984	NSW City	1	1	5	0	14
1984	New South Wales	3	0	10	0	20
1984	Australia	1	0	4	0	8
- Source: As of 23 May 2013

Ross Conlon (born 29 March 1959) is an Australian former rugby league footballer who played in the 1980s. He played for the Western Suburbs Magpies, Canterbury-Bankstown Bulldogs and Balmain Tigers in the New South Wales Rugby League premiership (NSWRL) as well as representative football for New South Wales and Australia. He was a renowned goalkicker and described as "One of the fastest players in the game."

== Playing career ==
Conlon, a Centre who was equally at home on the Wing, was notable for his success as a goal-kicker. He developed an 'around-the-corner' sideways shuffle before moving in to strike the ball, claiming the shuffle gave him more time. Conlon credits this habit to soccer, a game he played until the age of fifteen. His goal kicking style and shuffle was later copied by Illawarra Steelers winger Rod Wishart.

Conlon played junior football with Murwillumbah. Having scored 180 points while playing in the University Cup competition for Mount St Patric in 1980, he was noticed by Wests coach, Roy Masters.

Having only played 3 under-23s matches, Conlon debuted for Wests in round 6 of the 1981 NSWRFL season, scoring a try against North Sydney. His performance in a televised match was noted, with the next days paper saying, "Tall and fast, Conlon came up with a debut match that footballers dream about. The Magpies have unearthed a dashing new find."

In his two seasons with Wests, Conlon scored 12 tries and 148 points, but was often second choice of goalkicker behind Greg Cox. His last game for the Magpies was in the 1982 semi-finals.

After two seasons with the Western Suburbs, Conlon signed with Canterbury in 1983. Conlon had a successful season with Canterbury, and the team made it to the preliminary final against Parramatta Eels. Conlon dislocated his hip in the game but was able to return to first-grade in round 10 of the 1984 season.

Within a few weeks of his return from injury, Conlon was selected on the wing for NSW City in the annual City vs Country game at the Sydney Cricket Ground. He scored 14 points from a try and 5 goals. His performance for NSW City earned him selection for game I of the 1984 State of Origin series for New South Wales. Conlon played in all three game of the 1984 series for the Blues, kicking ten goals. In June 1984, with Eric Grothe injured, Conlon made his first and only appearance in an Australian representative side. He was selected for the first Test of the Ashes series against Great Britain and kicked four goals.

Although Conlon made representative selection in 1984, his form dropped later in the season and Canterbury coach, Warren Ryan, dropped Conlon to the bench in round 24. Conlon wasn't included in any of the team line-ups for the rest of the season and he was omitted from the successful team that met Parramatta in the 1984 grand final.

Conlon joined Balmain for the 1985 season and he was one of the most consistent point-scorers during the mid-1980s. In the 1987 NSWRL season, he led the competition's point-scoring table with 196 points.

Conlon was a member of the Balmain team which lost to his former club, Canterbury, in the 1988 grand final.

== Post-playing career ==
At the end of the 1988 season, at the age of only 29, Conlon retired from first-grade rugby league and returned to country football as a player and coach.

Conlon coached in Casino and Murwillumbah following his retirement from playing and is now a schoolteacher. In 2007, he coached the Uralla Tigers to the Group 4 (Division 2) premiership.
