= Peter Mortimer (rugby league) =

Australian rugby league footballer

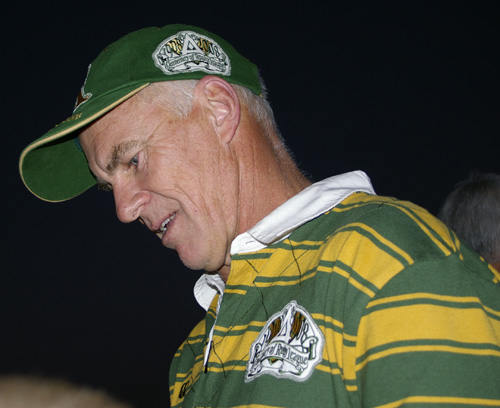
- Mortimer in 2008

Personal information
- Born: 22 December 1957 (age 68) Yagoona, New South Wales, Australia

Playing information
- Position: Wing
Club
Years	Team	Pld	T	G	FG	P
1977–87	Canterbury Bulldogs	190	78	0	0	272
1987–88	Hull Kingston Rovers	22	5	0	0	20
	Total	212	83	0	0	292
Representative
Years	Team	Pld	T	G	FG	P
1979	New South Wales	1	0	0	0	0
- Source: As of 24 October 2019
- Relatives: Chris Mortimer (brother); Steve Mortimer (brother); Glen Mortimer (brother); Daniel Mortimer (son)

Peter Mortimer (born 22 December 1957) is an Australian former professional rugby league footballer who played in the 1970s and 1980s. He played for the Canterbury-Bankstown Bulldogs and New South Wales.

== Background ==
Peter Mortimer was born in Yagoona, a suburb of Sydney, the second of the three brothers to play for Canterbury during the late 1970s, and 1980s. Glen Mortimer the 4th brother played 27 first grade games for Cronulla between 1983 and 1987 after starting out in the Bulldogs lower grades. Glen played one KB Cup match for Canterbury against Newtown in 1982. The brothers were all raised in the Riverina city of Wagga Wagga, New South Wales.

His son, Daniel, made his NRL debut in 2009 for the Parramatta Eels, continuing the family tradition.

== Playing career ==
Mortimer played 190 first grade games for Canterbury between 1977 and 1987, and is equal fourth on the all-time try-scoring list alongside older brother Steve. He was a member of the Canterbury Premiership winning teams in 1980, 1984 and 1985 and played in Canterbury's Grand Final loss in 1979.

Mortimer scored a try in Canterbury's 1979 Grand Final loss against St George and was their only try-scorer in the 1985 triumph against St George. He also had a try disallowed in the 1984 success against Parramatta.

Mortimer represented New South Wales during the 1979 Great Britain Lions tour and was unlucky not to play State of Origin and narrowly missed selection for the 1982 Kangaroo Tour. Even though Steve and Chris played for Australia Peter enjoyed a fine career at Canterbury as a winger or centre and was a popular and respected player amongst his teammates and opponents.

Peter Mortimer, his older brother Steve Mortimer and younger brother Chris Mortimer played in four Grand Finals together. Peter was a non-playing reserve in 1986 due to injury and only Steve was around when the 1988 Grand Final was played. No pair of brothers, yet alone trio of brothers have played in four Grand Finals in the last 30 years. All three Mortimer brothers are Life Members of the Canterbury-Bankstown Bulldogs Football Club.

== Post playing ==
Mortimer became Canterbury Marketing Manager in 1987 during his final season and continued in that position until 1991. He had a short period as Cronulla Chief Executive Officer in 1992. He returned to Canterbury in 2002 following the salary cap scandal where he took up a position as Football Club Director with brother Steve as Chief Executive. Peter Mortimer resigned as Football Club Director in 2004 not long after Steve Mortimer was forced out of his position.

He worked as a news reporter in Orange and is working in the wine industry, establishing Mortimers Wines.
