= Chris Mortimer =

Australia international rugby league footballer

Personal information
- Full name: Christopher Mortimer
- Born: 19 August 1959 (age 66) Wagga Wagga, New South Wales, Australia

Playing information
- Position: Centre, Five-eighth, Wing
Club
Years	Team	Pld	T	G	FG	P
1978–87	Canterbury-Bankstown	191	29	29	1	161
1988–90	Penrith Panthers	59	6	12	0	48
1990–91	Wakefield Trinity	24	2	0	0	8
	Total	274	37	41	1	217
Representative
Years	Team	Pld	T	G	FG	P
1984–89	New South Wales	9	1	0	0	4
1986	Australia	1	1	0	0	4
1983–89	NSW Country	5	1	0	0	4
- Source: RLP Yesterday's Hero As of 27 May 2026
- Relatives: Peter Mortimer (brother); Steve Mortimer (brother); Glen Mortimer (brother); Daniel Mortimer (nephew)

Chris Mortimer (born 19 August 1959 in Wagga Wagga, New South Wales) is an Australian former professional rugby league footballer who played in the 1970s, 1980s and 1990s for the Canterbury-Bankstown, Penrith, New South Wales and for the Australian national side.

== Playing career ==
Chris Mortimer was the youngest of the three famous brothers to play for Canterbury during the late 1970s, and 1980s. Glen Mortimer the 4th brother played 26 first grade games for Cronulla-Sutherland between 1983 and 1987 after starting out in the Bulldogs lower grades.

Mortimer played 192 first grade games for Canterbury between 1978 and 1987. He was a member of the Canterbury Premiership winning teams in 1980, 1984 and 1985 and played in Canterbury's Grand Final losses in 1979 and 1986.

Mortimer played for Penrith between 1988–90 and his final game for Penrith was in the 1990 Grand Final and has long been regarded as the best and most important signing made by the club at the time.

Mortimer also enjoyed success at representative level playing eight matches for NSW in 1984, 1985, 1986 and 1986. Mortimer played one Test against Papua New Guinea in 1986 and was a member of the undefeated Kangaroo Tour squad. His toughness, steel and defence were all very important during NSW's State of Origin series victories in 1985–86 with the 1985 triumph captained by brother Steve.

Regarded as one of the toughest centres during his career, Mortimer enjoyed great success against champions such as Michael Cronin, Mal Meninga and Gene Miles in the big matches.

Chris and his two older brothers Steve Mortimer and Peter Mortimer played in four Grand Finals together. Peter was a non-playing reserve in 1986 due to injury and only Steve was around when the 1988 Grand Final was played. No pair of brothers, yet alone trio of brothers have played in four Grand Finals together in the last 30 years. Steve and Chris ended up playing in five Grand Finals together. All three Mortimer brothers are Life Members of the Canterbury-Bankstown Bulldogs Football Club.

== Post playing ==
On 24 October 2000, Chris Mortimer was recipient of Australian Sports Medal.
