= 1990 Kangaroo tour of Great Britain and France =

1990 rugby league tour

1990 Kangaroos tour
- Date: 7 October 1990 – 9 December 1990
- Manager: Keith Barnes, Les Stokes
- Coach(es): Bob Fulton
- Tour captain(s): Mal Meninga
- Top point scorer(s): Greg Alexander (156)
- Top try scorer(s): Andrew Ettingshausen (15)
Summary
P	W	D	L
Total
18	17	0	1
Test match
5	4	0	1
Opponent
P	W	D	L
Great Britain
3	2	0	1
France
2	2	0	0

Tour chronology
- Previous tour: 1986
- Next tour: 1994

The 1990 Kangaroo Tour was the seventeenth Kangaroo Tour, where the Australian national rugby league team (known as the XXXX Kangaroos due to sponsorship reasons) travelled to Europe and played eighteen matches against British and French club and representative rugby league teams, in addition to three Test matches against Great Britain and two Tests against the French. It followed the tour of 1986 and the next was staged in 1994.

This series was the closest the British team came to reclaiming The Ashes since last winning in Australia in 1970. Great Britain won the first Test at Wembley Stadium and in the second Test at Old Trafford in Manchester the match was tied at 10-all until the final minutes when Australia scored a late try to win the game. Australia then went on to easily win the third and deciding Test and retain The Ashes. Australia won both Test series against Great Britain and France, suffering one loss (against Great Britain in the first Test), and remaining undefeated in tour matches against British clubs in a streak stretching back to midway through the 1978 tour.

The 17th Kangaroo tour was televised back to Australia on the Ten Network with commentary provided by Graeme Hughes, David Morrow and sideline reporter Tony Durkin. Also joining the commentary team at various stages, including the Ashes Tests, were then Manly-Warringah coach and former New Zealand national rugby league team and Wigan coach Graham Lowe, and the captain of 1986 Kangaroos, Wally Lewis. The Channel 10 coverage was sponsored by Just Jeans. The ABC televised the tests against France with former Wests Magpies winger and captain Warren Boland providing commentary. Various off-duty players including Mal Meninga, Benny Elias, Mark Geyer, Gary Belcher, Andrew Ettingshausen would also join the Ch.10 team in England as guest commentators or sideline reporters (with unrestricted access to coach Bob Fulton's tactics), while Allan Langer co-called the 2nd French test, the last game on the tour, with Boland on the ABC.

== The squad's leadership ==
The team was coached by Bob Fulton making his third Kangaroo Tour, though his first as coach (Fulton had captained the Kangaroos on his previous tour as a player in 1978). Mal Meninga was making a record third consecutive tour and his first as captain, while NSW captain Benny Elias (making his second tour) was named as the tours vice-captain. As per custom, the Australian Rugby League appointed two tour managers, one each from the Queensland and New South Wales rugby leagues. Former Kangaroo captain Keith Barnes was team manager from NSW, while Les Stokes was the manager from Qld.

Other staff included trainers Shaun McRae (who also acted as Fulton's assistant coach), Brian "The Sheriff" Hollis as a trainer/runner (Hollis had long been with Fulton during his time as Manly-Warringah coach during the 1980s), and World Champion boxing trainer Johnny Lewis (best known as Jeff Fenech's trainer) as team conditioner. Manly-Warringah club doctor Nathan Gibbs, a former South Sydney and Parramatta forward who had retired from playing in 1984 to concentrate on his medical studies, was team doctor. Gibbs made the controversial decision during the selection medicals to rule Kangaroo stalwart and likely captain Wally Lewis unfit for the tour and thus unable to make a third consecutive tour alongside Meninga.

== Touring squad ==
Player	Club	Position(s)	Tests (as sub)	Games (as sub)	Tries	Goals	F/Goals	Points
Greg Alexander	Penrith Panthers	Fullback, Wing	4 (3)	17 (7)	14	50/89	–	156
Gary Belcher	Canberra Raiders	Fullback, Wing	5	11	6	1/2	1	27
Martin Bella	Manly-Warringah Sea Eagles	Prop	1	11 (3)	–	–	–	0
Mark Carroll	South Sydney Rabbitohs	Second-row	0	6 (1)	2	–	–	8
John Cartwright	Penrith Panthers	Second-row, Lock	1	9 (2)	1	–	–	4
Laurie Daley	Canberra Raiders	Five-eighth, Centre	3	6	–	0/2	–	0
Ben Elias (vc)	Balmain Tigers	Hooker	4	10 (1)	2	–	–	8
Andrew Ettingshausen	Cronulla-Sutherland Sharks	Wing, Centre	5	12	15	–	–	60
Brad Fittler	Penrith Panthers	Centre, Five-eighth	0	8	8	–	–	32
Mark Geyer	Penrith Panthers	Second-row	1 (1)	11 (2)	4	–	–	16
David Gillespie	Canterbury-Bankstown Bulldogs	Second-row, Prop, Lock	3 (2)	10 (4)	1	–	–	4
Michael Hancock	Brisbane Broncos	Wing	1	6 (1)	4	–	–	16
Des Hasler	Manly-Warringah Sea Eagles	Lock, Halfback, Wing	4 (4)	13 (6)	3	–	–	12
Chris Johns	Brisbane Broncos	Wing, Centre	1 (1)	11 (4)	4	–	–	16
Allan Langer	Brisbane Broncos	Halfback	1	11	4	–	–	16
Glenn Lazarus	Canberra Raiders	Prop	5 (1)	13 (5)	2	–	–	8
Bob Lindner	Western Suburbs Magpies	Lock, Second-row	4	10 (1)	2	–	–	8
Cliff Lyons	Manly-Warringah Sea Eagles	Five-eighth, Centre	4	8	3	–	–	12
Brad Mackay	St George Dragons	Lock, Second-row	4	12 (3)	4	–	–	16
Mal Meninga (c)	Canberra Raiders	Centre	5	11	8	16/38	–	64
Mark McGaw	Cronulla-Sutherland Sharks	Centre	1	6 (1)	1	–	–	4
Steve Roach	Balmain Tigers	Prop	5	10	2	–	–	8
Mark Sargent	Newcastle Knights	Prop	3 (3)	11 (3)	6	–	–	24
Dale Shearer	Brisbane Broncos	Wing, Centre	5 (1)	13 (1)	9	1/1	–	38
Paul Sironen	Balmain Tigers	Second-row	5	10	3	–	–	12
Ricky Stuart	Canberra Raiders	Halfback, Five-eighth	5	9	1	–	1	5
Kerrod Walters	Brisbane Broncos	Hooker	1	8	2	–	–	8
Kevin Walters	Brisbane Broncos	Centre, Five-eighth, Hooker	0	8	5	–	–	20

== By club ==
The touring side was represented by 19 New South Welshmen (N) and 9 Queenslanders (Q).

- Brisbane Broncos (6): Michael Hancock (Q), Chris Johns (N), Allan Langer (Q), Dale Shearer (Q), Kerrod Walters (Q), Kevin Walters (Q)
- Canberra Raiders (5): Mal Meninga (captain) (Q), Gary Belcher (Q), Laurie Daley (N), Glenn Lazarus (N), Ricky Stuart (N)
- Penrith Panthers (4): Greg Alexander (N), John Cartwright (N), Brad Fittler (N), Mark Geyer (N),
- Balmain Tigers (3): Ben Elias (vice-captain) (N), Steve Roach (N), Paul Sironen (N)
- Manly-Warringah Sea Eagles (3): Martin Bella (Q), Des Hasler (N), Cliff Lyons (N)
- Cronulla Sutherland Sharks (2): Andrew Ettingshausen (N), Mark McGaw (N)
- Canterbury-Bankstown Bulldogs (1): David Gillespie (N)
- Newcastle Knights (1): Mark Sargent (N)
- South Sydney Rabbitohs (1): Mark Carroll (N)
- St George Dragons (1): Brad Mackay (N)
- Western Suburbs Magpies (1): Bob Lindner (Q)

Mal Meninga was making his third Kangaroo Tour having also toured in 1982 and 1986. Greg Alexander, Gary Belcher, Martin Bella, Ben Elias, Des Hasler, Bob Lindner, Steve Roach, Dale Shearer and Paul Sironen were all 1986 tourists. For the rest of the squad it was their first ever Kangaroo Tour.

The Kangaroos went away with four club halfbacks in the squad. Test incumbent Allan Langer; Canberra's former Wallaby and dual premiership winning half Ricky Stuart; and former test halfbacks Des Hasler and Greg Alexander – though Hasler's ability to play almost anywhere in the backline as well as the back row, saw him as the team's utility player while Alexander would play the tour as backup fullback to Gary Belcher, along with two games on the wing : one against Widnes, the final tour game on the English leg; the other the second Test against France, the final game of the tour (he had also played most of the game against Castleford on the wing after replacing the injured Mark McGaw). Like Terry Lamb in 1986, Alexander was selected for every game on the tour, though unlike Lamb he did not appear in each game after not getting off the bench in the second Ashes Test at Old Trafford. Alexander was the only one of the quartet not to start a game at halfback while on tour, though he did spend some time in his preferred position at various times including the first Test against France when he was forced on after just 15 minutes to replace an ill Ricky Stuart.

1990 was the first Kangaroo Tour to Great Britain and France where the entire playing party came from the NSWRL Premiership and since the 1988 introduction of the Gold Coast Chargers, Brisbane Broncos and Newcastle Knights expanding the competition to 16 clubs with 5 Queensland players coming from Brisbane Broncos, 2 from Canberra Raiders, 1 from Manly Sea Eagles and 1 from Western Suburbs Magpies.

While Meninga was making his third tour, making their second Kangaroo Tours were: Benny Elias, Greg Alexander, Gary Belcher, Martin Bella, Des Hasler, Bob Lindner, Steve Roach, Dale Shearer and Paul Sironen. Each player making their second (or third) tour played at least one Test match on the tour.

== Great Britain ==
The Ashes series against Great Britain saw a record aggregate crowd of 133,684 attending the Test series, easily beating the previous record of 114,883 set during the 1948–49 Kangaroo tour and was some 66,130 more than had attended the 1988 Ashes series in Australia. As with the 1982 and 1986 tours, the game against Wigan at Central Park drew the biggest club game attendance of the Kangaroo Tour with a crowd of 24,814.

The tour took place during the 1990–91 Rugby Football League season. Bradford Northern, a regular stop for the tourists, were allegedly left off the tour itinerary after being fined by the RFL for fielding what was virtually a reserve grade side against the touring New Zealand team in 1989.

Of the 13 games the Kangaroos played in England, four of the teams (Wigan, Warrington, Castleford and Hull) were coached by Australian's while one other (St Helens) was coached by a New Zealander.

=== Test Venues ===
The three Ashes series tests took place at the following venues.

1990 was the first tour since 1911–12 not to play at test at one of the larger club grounds such as Central Park, Headingley or Odsal Stadium.

London	Manchester	Leeds
Wembley Stadium	Old Trafford	Elland Road
Capacity: 82,000	Capacity: 48,000	Capacity: 32,500

Sunday, 7 October	St. Helens	4–34	Australia	Knowsley Road, St. Helens
	Tries: Les Quirk; Goals: Bernard Dwyer (0/1); Tea Ropati (0/2)	[ Report]	Tries: Andrew Ettingshausen (3), Mal Meninga (2), Kerrod Walters, Steve Roach, Michael Hancock; Goals: Mal Meninga (1/6); Laurie Daley (0/1); Greg Alexander (0/1)	Attendance: 15,219; Referee: John Holdsworth; Player of the Match: John Cartwright

St Helens	Australia

FB	1	Gary Connolly
RW	2	Alan Hunte
CE	3	Tea Ropati
CE	4	Phil Veivers
LW	5	Les Quirk
SO	6	Jonathan Griffiths
SH	7	Shane Cooper (c)
PR	8	Jon Neill
HK	9	Paul Groves
PR	10	Kevin Ward
SR	11	Paul Forber
SR	12	Bernard Dwyer
LF	13	John Harrison
Substitutions:
IC	14	Mark Bailey
IC	15	George Mann
IC	16	Ian Connor
IC	17	Roy Haggerty
Coach:
(New Zealand) Mike McLennan

FB	1	Gary Belcher
RW	2	Andrew Ettingshausen
CE	3	Mal Meninga (c)
CE	4	Mark McGaw
LW	5	Michael Hancock
FE	6	Laurie Daley
HB	7	Allan Langer
PR	8	Steve Roach
HK	9	Kerrod Walters
PR	10	Martin Bella
SR	11	John Cartwright
SR	12	Paul Sironen
LK	13	Bob Lindner
Substitutions:
IC	14	Chris Johns
IC	15	Glenn Lazarus
IC	16	Brad Mackay
IC	17	Greg Alexander
Coach:
(Australia) Bob Fulton

Kangaroos skipper Mal Meninga, a crowd favourite at St Helens after playing with the club in 1984–85 and helping them to win the Premiership and Lancashire Cup, returned to Knowsley Road and scored two tries, including the opening try of the tour. Andrew Ettingshausen came into the side on the wing in place of Dale Shearer who was ruled out with a stomach muscle strain, and crossed for a hat-trick of tries.

Wednesday, 10 October	Wakefield Trinity	18–36	Australia	Belle Vue, Wakefield
	Tries: Nick Du Toit, Andy Mason, Andrew Wilson; Goals: Mark Conway (3/4)	[ Report]	Tries: Mark Sargent, Chris Johns, Kevin Walters, Ricky Stuart, Glenn Lazarus, Brad Fittler; Goals: Greg Alexander (6/7)	Attendance: 7,724; Referee: Kevin Allatt; Player of the Match: Glenn Lazarus

Wakefield Trinity	Australia

FB	1	Chris Perry
RW	2	David Jones
CE	3	Ged Byrne
CE	4	Phil Eden
LW	5	Andy Mason
SO	6	Tracy Lazenby
SH	7	Mark Conway
PR	8	Adrian Shelford
HK	9	John Thompson
PR	10	Nigel Bell
SR	11	Andy Kelly (c)
SR	12	Nick Du Toit
LF	13	Gary Price
Substitutions:
IC	14	Richard Slater
IC	15	Billy Conway
IC	16	Andy Wilson
IC	17	Lynton Morris
Coach:
(England) David Topliss

FB	1	Greg Alexander
RW	2	Chris Johns
CE	3	Brad Fittler
CE	4	Kevin Walters
LW	5	Dale Shearer
FE	6	Cliff Lyons
HB	7	Ricky Stuart
PR	8	Glenn Lazarus
HK	9	Ben Elias (c)
PR	10	Mark Sargent
SR	11	David Gillespie
SR	12	Mark Carroll
LK	13	Brad Mackay
Substitutions:
IC	14	Mark Geyer
IC	15	Mark McGaw
IC	16	Des Hasler
IC	17	Bob Lindner
Coach:
(Australia) Bob Fulton

Referee Kevin Allatt sent 4 players off during this game and sin binned 3 others. Sent off 8 minutes before halftime were John Thompson (WT) and Mark Carroll (Aus), while Ricky Stuart (Aus) and David Gillespie (Aus) who was actually sent off for back chatting the referee after the game had finished, followed suit in the second half. Billy Conway (WT), Des Hasler and Dale Shearer (Aus) were also sent to the sin-bin during the game. In a media interview after the game, Australian coach Bob Fulton said it was something like out of Fawlty Towers and that he couldn't believe that the referee lost control. Fulton also added that the referee had told him before the game that he was 48 years old, causing the Australian coach to think that he should have been home in front of a warm fire with a cup of tea rather than refereeing a professional game of football. With Carroll and Stuart sent off and Shearer in the bin, Australia actually finished the game with only 10 players on the field before Gillespie's post-siren send-off.

In English club football at the time, players sent-off during a match were required to face the RFL judiciary, including those from touring international teams. All three Kangaroos, Carroll, Stuart and Gillespie, escaped suspension from the league who agreed that the send-offs were enough punishment under the circumstances.

Penrith's Brad Fittler, who was aged 18 years and 247 days on the day of the game and just 12 months earlier had made his First Grade debut for the Panthers and had been a member of the Australian Schoolboys side, played in the centres and officially became the youngest ever Kangaroo tourist, also scoring a second half try on debut.

Sunday, 14 October	Wigan	6–34	Australia	Central Park, Wigan
	Tries: Shaun Edwards; Goals: Joe Lydon (1/1)	[ Report]	Tries: Andrew Ettingshausen (3), Michael Hancock, Gary Belcher, Brad Mackay, Allan Langer; Goals: Mal Meninga (3/7)	Attendance: 24,814; Referee: Colin Morris; Player of the Match: Gary Belcher

Wigan	Australia

FB	1	Steve Hampson
RW	2	David Myers
CE	3	Kevin Iro
CE	4	Joe Lydon
LW	5	David Marshall
SO	6	Shaun Edwards
SH	7	Andy Gregory
PR	8	Ian Lucas
HK	9	Martin Dermott
PR	10	Kelvin Skerrett
SR	11	Denis Betts
SR	12	Andy Goodway
LF	13	Ellery Hanley (c)
Substitutions:
IC	14	Bobbie Goulding
IC	15	Mark Preston
IC	16	Ian Gildart
IC	17	Mike Forshaw
Coach:
(Australia) John Monie

FB	1	Gary Belcher
RW	2	Andrew Ettingshausen
CE	3	Mal Meninga (c)
CE	4	Mark McGaw
LW	5	Michael Hancock
FE	6	Laurie Daley
HB	7	Allan Langer
PR	8	Steve Roach
HK	9	Kerrod Walters
PR	10	Martin Bella
SR	11	John Cartwright
SR	12	Paul Sironen
LK	13	Bob Lindner
Substitutions:
IC	14	Ricky Stuart
IC	15	Glenn Lazarus
IC	16	Brad Mackay
IC	17	Greg Alexander
Coach:
(Australia) Bob Fulton

The match against English power club Wigan was generally regarded as the Kangaroos "4th Test" in England. However, as the team had done a week earlier against St Helens, the Kangaroos won the match easily with Wigan's only score coming from a first half penalty try to Shaun Edwards who was illegally pulled down in a chase to the ball by Bob Lindner (had Edwards not been awarded the try it would have still been scored anyway as Wigan winger David Myers had beaten everyone to ground the ball in the in-goal). Joe Lydon converted and Wigan led 6–0, but from there the Kangaroos took control of the game. Two tries to Ettingshausen and singles to Michael Hancock and man of the match Gary Belcher saw the Kangaroos race to a 20–6 lead at half time. And hopes of a Wigan comeback were snuffed out early in the second half when Ettingshausen crossed for his second hat-trick of the tour in just two games. Further tries to Brad Mackay and Alfie Langer pushed the final score out to 34–6 (Australia's highest ever score against the Cherry and Whites) and only Mal Meninga's continued poor goal kicking (3/7 here to follow his 1/6 against St Helens) kept the score from being even greater.

Wednesday, 17 October	Cumbria	10–42	Australia	Derwent Park, Workington
	Tries: Willie Richardson; Goals: Graeme Cameron (1/1); Barry Vickers (1/2); Field Goals: Dean Marwood (2)	[ Report]	Tries: Dale Shearer (3), Cliff Lyons (2), Mark Carroll, Mark Geyer, Ben Elias; Goals: Greg Alexander (5/8)	Attendance: 6,750; Referee: Jim Smith; Player of the Match: Des Hasler

Cumbria	Australia

FB	1	Barry Vickers
RW	2	Willie Richardson
CE	3	William Fisher
CE	4	Neil Rooney
LW	5	Chris Rudd
SO	6	Graeme Cameron
SH	7	Dean Marwood
PR	8	Colin Armstrong
HK	9	Gary Mounsey
PR	10	Stephen Howes
SR	11	Gary Kendall
SR	12	Peter Riley
LF	13	Russ Walker (c)
Substitutions:
IC	14	Paul Penrice
IC	15	Gary Chambers
IC	16	Norman Lofthouse
IC	17	Jonathan Neil
Coach:
(Cumbria) Phil Kitchin

FB	1	Greg Alexander
RW	2	Dale Shearer
CE	3	Cliff Lyons
CE	4	Brad Fittler
LW	5	Chris Johns
FE	6	Kevin Walters
HB	7	Ricky Stuart
PR	8	David Gillespie
HK	9	Ben Elias (c)
PR	10	Mark Sargent
SR	11	Mark Carroll
SR	12	Mark Geyer
LK	13	Des Hasler
Substitutions:
IC	14	Brad Mackay
IC	15
IC	16	Bob Lindner
IC	17	Glenn Lazarus
Coach:
(Australia) Bob Fulton

The match against Cumbria in Workington was the 1990 Kangaroos only game against an English county team (the Kangaroos had not played any other county side since 1967). As had become the pattern for the midweek game on tour, the game was played in the rain. Starting at lock forward (a position he'd played through most of 1990 with Manly) and moving to halfback early in the second half after Ricky Stuart came off after an elbow to the chest, Des Hasler was the official Man of the Match while Dale Shearer signalled his intentions to return to the top team with a hat trick of tries. For the Cumbrians, 20 year old Barrow halfback Dean Marwood was their best player using a clever kicking game to continually turn the Kangaroos defence around. He also kicked two field goals which he later told TV broadcaster The Sports Channel helped settle his nerves. In a pre-game interview, Cumbrian coach Phil Kitchin told The Sports Channel that he'd had trouble even getting players together for a training run before this midweek game mainly due to the number of injuries eligible Cumbrian players had in the previous weekends, though he was finally able to string a side together for three training sessions. Cumbria even lost former Warrington hooker Mark Roskell on the morning of the game with a virus, his place was taken on the afternoon of the game by Whitehaven's Gary Mounsey.

Sunday, 21 October	Leeds	10–22	Australia	Headingley, Leeds
	Tries: John Gallagher, Paul Dixon; Goals: Simon Irving (1/2)	[ Report]	Tries: Paul Sironen (2), Mal Meninga, Bob Lindner; Goals: Mal Meninga (3/5)	Attendance: 16,037; Referee: Ray Tennant; Player of the Match: Paul Sironen

Leeds	Australia

FB	1	John Gallagher
RW	2	Phil Ford
CE	3	Simon Irving
CE	4	Carl Gibson
LW	5	Vince Fawcett
SO	6	Garry Schofield (c)
SH	7	Paul Harkin
PR	8	Roy Powell
HK	9	Richard Gunn
PR	10	Steve Molloy
SR	11	Cavill Heugh
SR	12	Paul Dixon
LF	13	Mike Kuiti
Substitutions:
IC	14	Gary Divorty
IC	15	Paul Delaney
IC	16	David Creasser
IC	17	Dai Young
Coach:
(England) David Ward

FB	1	Gary Belcher
RW	2	Andrew Ettingshausen
CE	3	Mal Meninga (c)
CE	4	Mark McGaw
LW	5	Michael Hancock
FE	6	Laurie Daley
HB	7	Allan Langer
PR	8	Steve Roach
HK	9	Kerrod Walters
PR	10	Martin Bella
SR	11	Brad Mackay
SR	12	Paul Sironen
LK	13	Bob Lindner
Substitutions:
IC	14	Ben Elias
IC	15	Glenn Lazarus
IC	16	Greg Alexander
IC	17	David Gillespie
Coach:
(Australia) Bob Fulton

During the game against Leeds at Headingley, the home side led the Kangaroos 10–6 at half time thanks to tries from former All Blacks fullback John Gallagher and Great Britain forward Paul Dixon who was awarded a try after what appeared to be a Leeds knock-on. This was the first time since Hull F.C. led the Kangaroos 7–0 at The Boulevard during game 12 of the 1982 Kangaroo tour that a British team (club, county or test) had led the tourists at half time of a match. An all-in brawl in the first half left Australian five-eight Laurie Daley with a broken bone in his right hand leaving him in doubt for the upcoming first test at Wembley Stadium

=== The Ashes series ===
After heavy criticism of French referee Alain Sablayrolles (who could not speak English), this would be the final time an Ashes series was refereed by a Frenchman. From the 1992 series referees would be from either Australia, Britain or New Zealand.

==== First Test ====
In the first rugby league international played at Wembley for 17 years, Ellery Hanley inspired a stirring first Test win for the Lions in front of 54,569 fans, the largest ever Test attendance in England and breaking the record of 50,583 set at Old Trafford in the first Ashes Test of the 1986 Kangaroo tour.

Lions coach Mal Reilly named the expected side, as did Bob Fulton. However, due to a broken hand suffered by Laurie Daley in the game against Leeds, Fulton elected to play Canberra Raiders halfback Ricky Stuart at Five-eighth in his test debut. Stuart's selection saw him become the 38th Australian dual-rugby international having previously played for the Australia national rugby union team during their 1987 tour of Argentina. Although not selected for the test, Kangaroos forward Mark Carroll suffered a knee injury during the team's first training session in London at the Crystal Palace ground, the home of London's only professional league club of the time Fulham. The injury required Carroll to undergo an arthroscopy which would see him not return to the field until the game against Hull F.C. three weeks later.

Saturday, 27 October

Great Britain	19–12	Australia
Tries: Paul Eastwood (2); Martin Offiah; Goals: Paul Eastwood (3/6); Field Goals: Garry Schofield (1)		Tries: Mal Meninga; Mark McGaw; Goals: Mal Meninga (2/4)

Wembley Stadium, London
Attendance: 54,569
Referee: Alain Sablayrolles (France)
Player of the Match: Garry Schofield

Great Britain	Australia

FB	1	Steve Hampson
RW	2	Paul Eastwood
CE	3	Daryl Powell
CE	4	Carl Gibson
LW	5	Martin Offiah
SO	6	Garry Schofield
SH	7	Andy Gregory
PR	8	Karl Harrison
HK	9	Lee Jackson
PR	10	Paul Dixon
SR	11	Denis Betts
SR	12	Roy Powell
LF	13	Ellery Hanley (c)
Substitutions:
IC	14	Karl Fairbank
IC	15	Kevin Ward
IC	16	Shaun Edwards
IC	17
Coach:
(England) Mal Reilly

FB	1	Gary Belcher
LW	2	Michael Hancock
CE	3	Mal Meninga (c)
CE	4	Mark McGaw
RW	5	Andrew Ettingshausen
FE	6	Ricky Stuart
HB	7	Allan Langer
PR	8	Steve Roach
HK	9	Kerrod Walters
PR	10	Martin Bella
SR	11	Paul Sironen
SR	12	John Cartwright
LK	13	Bob Lindner
Substitutions:
IC	14	Glenn Lazarus
IC	15	Des Hasler
IC	16	Greg Alexander
IC	17	Dale Shearer
Coach:
(Australia) Bob Fulton

Immediately after the kickoff, the Kangaroos got a taste of test football in England when Martin Bella received the ball for the first hit up. The Lions, knowing they were kicking off and that Australia were to handle the ball first, had coated the ball with petroleum jelly to make it extra slippery and Bella dropped the ball in the opening tackle (during the stop in play the British trainer came onto the field with a towel for Andy Gregory to wipe the jelly from the ball before he fed the scrum). Lions players also came in for criticism as a number were seen to have the jelly smeared on their legs to make them harder to tackle. The Lions soon opened the scoring after Bob Lindner had been tackled and had then played the ball forward. Sablayrolles ruled that Lindner had a marker and a nervous Paul Eastwood kicked a penalty goal that bounced in off the posts. Eastwood's next kick about 15 minutes later also hit the posts but this time bounced back into play, though luckily for Australia Lindner was in place to take the ball and prevent the Lions from scoring a try.

The Kangaroos were having difficulty with the French referee's interpretations (the penalty count would eventually favour the home side 17–7), but although the Lions enjoyed the bulk of possession, the Aussie's managed to weather the storm and at half time the score was locked at 2–all. Ellery Hanley and Garry Schofield's tactic of kicking over the Kangaroos defensive line rather than having their forwards trying to bash their way through it was proving to be a problem.

Despite a brilliant individual try in the second half to Mark McGaw after Steve Hampson and Carl Gibson had collided while attempting to tackle him, and a try to Mal Meninga, the Aussies were in trouble all day. The Lions, led by Hanley and Schofield were playing better than expected and after second half tries to Martin Offiah following a dropped bomb by Belcher in front of the posts (the Australian fullback had been hit in a perfectly timed tackle by Hanley who chased his own kick and caused Belcher to spill the ball straight into the arms of the waiting Offiah), a double to Eastwood who scored the winning try and a field goal by Schofield saw the Lions take a famous 19–12 win. After also winning the final game of the 1988 series in Sydney, this was Great Britain's second straight win over Australia and ended any hopes that the 1990 Tour would emulate the unbeaten 1982 and 1986 Kangaroo tours.

Wednesday, 31 October	Warrington	6–26	Australia	Wilderspool Stadium, Warrington
	Tries: Tony Thorniley; Goals: David Lyon (1)	[ Report]	Tries: Brad Fittler, Brad Mackay, Mark Geyer, Michael Hancock, Mark Sargent; Goals: Greg Alexander (3)	Attendance: 10,200; Referee: Dave Carter; Player of the Match: Glenn Lazarus

Warrington	Australia

FB	1	David Lyon
RW	2	Des Drummond
CE	3	Allan Bateman
CE	4	Tony Thorniley
LW	5	Paul Williamson
SO	6	Chris O'Sullivan
SH	7	Kevin Ellis
PR	8	Neil Harmon
HK	9	Duane Mann
PR	10	Tony Burke
SR	11	Paul Cullen
SR	12	Mike Gregory (c)
LF	13	Robert Jackson
Substitutions:
IC	14	Chris Rudd
IC	15	Billy McGinty
IC	16	Mark Thomas
IC	17	Paul Derbyshire
Coach:
(Australia) Brian Johnson

FB	1	Greg Alexander
RW	2	Chris Johns
CE	3	Mal Meninga (c)
CE	4	Kevin Walters
LW	5	Dale Shearer
FE	6	Brad Fittler
HB	7	Des Hasler
PR	8	Glenn Lazarus
HK	9	Ben Elias
PR	10	Mark Sargent
SR	11	Mark Geyer
SR	12	David Gillespie
LK	13	Brad Mackay
Substitutions:
IC	14	Michael Hancock
IC	15	John Cartwright
IC	16
IC	17
Coach:
(Australia) Bob Fulton

Despite this being a midweek match just four days after the test at Wembley, Mal Meninga played the game against Warrington at his own request. Former Great Britain captain Mike Gregory made his return from injury for the home side. The Aussies aura of invincibility had been broken by the first test loss at Wembley, giving hope to not only the Lions test side but also the rest of the club sides waiting to play the Kangaroos and the scoreline was generally believed to have flattered the Kangaroos. It wasn't until late in the game that they put it out of Warrington's reach.

Sunday, 4 November	Castleford	8–28	Australia	Wheldon Road, Castleford
	Tries: David Plange; Goals: Lee Crooks (1/1); Graham Steadman (1/1)	[ Report]	Tries: Andrew Ettingshausen (2), Bob Lindner, Dale Shearer, Mal Meninga; Goals: Mal Meninga (4/5)	Attendance: 9,033; Referee: Gerry Kershaw; Player of the Match: Paul Sironen

Castleford	Australia

FB	1	St John Ellis
RW	2	Steve Larder
CE	3	Shaun Irwin
CE	4	Grant Anderson
LW	5	David Plange
SO	6	Graham Steadman
SH	7	Gary French
PR	8	Lee Crooks
HK	9	Kevin Beardmore
PR	10	Dean Sampson
SR	11	Keith England
SR	12	Jeff Hardy
LF	13	John Joyner (c)
Substitutions:
IC	14	Paul Fletcher
IC	15	Martin Ketteridge
IC	16	Neil Roebuck
IC	17	Andy Clarke
Coach:
(Australia) Darryl van der Velde

FB	1	Gary Belcher
LW	2	Dale Shearer
CE	3	Mal Meninga (c)
CE	4	Mark McGaw
RW	5	Andrew Ettingshausen
FE	6	Cliff Lyons
HB	7	Ricky Stuart
PR	8	Steve Roach
HK	9	Ben Elias
PR	10	Glenn Lazarus
SR	11	Paul Sironen
SR	12	Bob Lindner
LK	13	Brad Mackay
Substitutions:
IC	14	Greg Alexander
IC	15	Allan Langer
IC	16	Martin Bella
IC	17	John Cartwright
Coach:
(Australia) Bob Fulton

The Kangaroos played with the expected second test lineup. Dale Shearer had replaced Michael Hancock on the wing. Cliff Lyons came in at 5/8 with Ricky Stuart moved to halfback at the expense of Allan Langer who played this game from the bench (he came on to replace Stuart with only 8 minutes remaining). Glenn Lazarus replaced Martin Bella in the front row (Bella also played from the bench) while Brad Mackay came in at lock with Bob Lindner moved to the second row in place of John Cartwright (again on the bench). Mark McGaw's tour ended just 20 minutes into the game after rupturing the Medial ligament in his right knee. The injury occurred when his knee came into accidental contact with the head of Glenn Lazarus while the pair were tackling Castleford pivot Graham Steadman (who also banged his knee with McGaw's, though without injury). For his part, Lazarus required 17 stitches to bad gash above his left eye and would not take any further part, replaced by the man who had seemingly lost his place to the dual Canberra premiership winning prop, Martin Bella.

Midway through the second half, Castleford's Australian coach Darryl van der Velde defused a potentially volatile situation by replacing Lee Crooks who had begun to be involved in a number of flare-ups with Kangaroos front rower Steve Roach. Prior to coming off, veteran Crooks who had made his test debut for Great Britain as a teenager against the 1982 Kangaroos, was arguably Castleford's best player on the day.

Tuesday, 6 November	Halifax	18–36	Australia	Thrum Hall, Halifax
	Tries: Rob Hutchinson (2), Greg Austin, Wilf George; Goals: Steve Smith (1)	[ Report]	Tries: Chris Johns (2), Mark Geyer, Mark Sargent, Greg Alexander, Kevin Walters, Michael Hancock; Goals: Greg Alexander (3)	Attendance: 8,730; Referee: Brian Galtress; Player of the Match: Greg Alexander

Halifax	Australia

FB	1	Steve Smith
RW	2	Rob Hutchinson
CE	3	Mark Elia
CE	4	Greg Austin
LW	5	Wilf George
SO	6	Martin Wood
SH	7	Roy Southernwood (c)
PR	8	Dick Fairbank
HK	9	Seamus McCallion
PR	10	Brendan Hill
SR	11	Mike Keebles
SR	12	Mick Scott
LF	13	Alan Platt
Substitutions:
IC	14	Tony Mitchell
IC	15	Richard Milner
IC	16	Ben Beavers
IC	17	James Ramshaw
Coach:
(England) Peter Roe

FB	1	Greg Alexander
RW	2	Dale Shearer
CE	3	Chris Johns
CE	4	Kevin Walters
LW	5	Michael Hancock
FE	6	Brad Fittler
HB	7	Allan Langer (c)
PR	8	David Gillespie
HK	9	Kerrod Walters
PR	10	Mark Sargent
SR	11	John Cartwright
SR	12	Mark Geyer
LK	13	Des Hasler
Substitutions:
IC	14	Martin Bella
IC	15
IC	16
IC	17
Coach:
(Australia) Bob Fulton

Halifax were the only 2nd Division team the Kangaroos faced in 1990 and were out to prove their worth. However, as per normal for the English club sides on the tour, after 15 minutes their intensity dropped and by halftime the Kangaroos had cruised to a 32–6 lead. With both Mal Meninga and Ben Elias not playing and expected to be named in the second test team, Bob Fulton handed the captaincy for the game to Allan Langer. Mark Geyer got the ball rolling with the opening try after Halifax fullback Steve Smith spilled a Greg Alexander bomb behind his posts. From there tries to Mark Sargent, Alexander, Kevin Walters and a double to Chris Johns saw the Kangaroos shoot away with Australian centre Greg Austin scoring the only try for the home side. In an unsavory incident, as he crossed for a try just after the half-time siren, Kevin Walters was hit on the head by a coin thrown from the crowd.

Halifax out-scored the Kangaroos 12–4 in the second half, aided no end by referee Brian Galtress who handed the home side some 10 penalties to just 2 to the Kangaroos in the half (Halifax won the penalty count 15–6 and according to media reports, Halifax coach Peter Roe was seen having harsh words with the referee at half time). Galtress also disallowed 3 seemingly fair tries to the Australians in the second half, including one to Dale Shearer who was ruled offside from a Kevin Walters kick although television replays indicated that Shearer had been about one metre behind Walters.

Soon after scoring Australia's last try of the night midway through the second half, test winger Michael Hancock suffered an ankle injury which forced him from the field. It would cost him what slim chance he had of keeping his place in the side for the upcoming second test with Brisbane teammate Dale Shearer ultimately re-claiming his place on the Australian test wing. The Kangaroos wore black armbands on the night as a tribute to Dale Shearer's grandfather Jock, who had died during the week.

==== Second Test ====
Bob Fulton made a number of changes from the first Test loss at Wembley. Dale Shearer returned to the wing in place of Michael Hancock. A knee injury against Castleford when his knee had collided with the head of teammate Glenn Lazarus (who suffered a bad cut requiring 17 stitches) had ended centre Mark McGaw's tour with Laurie Daley returning to the test team to partner Meninga in the centres despite having a broken bone in his right hand. Cliff Lyons, who (along with Shearer) had won a premiership with Manly under Fulton in 1987, was called up to make his test debut with Ricky Stuart moving to his preferred halfback spot in place of Allan Langer. Others coming into the side were Benny Elias (hooker) for his first test since the 1988 World Cup final in place of Kerrod Walters, Glenn Lazarus in the front row at the expense of Martin Bella and playing in headgear to protect the stitches (though the headgear wouldn't last long). Like Langer, Bella lost his place in the top side altogether with Mark Sargent making history becoming the first ever Newcastle Knights player to earn Australian test selection (though he ultimately wouldn't get onto the field for his debut until the 3rd test). Brad Mackay's good performances on tour saw him come back into the Test side at lock with Bob Lindner moving to the second row at the expense of John Cartwright who dropped to the bench.

Mal Reilly stuck with much of the same side that had won the first test, though injury ruled out Bradford Northern's Karl Fairbank with Leeds forward Roy Powell moved to the bench. Wigan's Andy Platt returned from injury in the front row which saw Leeds back rower Paul Dixon dropping back to his preferred second row. Despite not having played for a month since twisting his ankle while training for the Kangaroos tour opener, St Helens goal kicking back Paul Loughlin was selected on the bench ahead of well performed Widnes goal kicking back, the speedy "Welsh Wizard" Jonathan Davies.

Saturday, 10 November

Great Britain	10–14	Australia
Tries: Paul Dixon; Paul Loughlin Goals: Paul Eastwood (1/3)		Tries: Dale Shearer; Cliff Lyons; Mal Meninga; Goals: Mal Meninga (1/4)

Old Trafford, Manchester
Attendance: 46,615
Referee: Alain Sablayrolles (France)
Player of the Match: Ben Elias

Great Britain	Australia

FB	1	Steve Hampson
RW	2	Paul Eastwood
CE	3	Daryl Powell
CE	4	Carl Gibson
LW	5	Martin Offiah
SO	6	Garry Schofield
SH	7	Andy Gregory
PR	8	Karl Harrison
HK	9	Lee Jackson
PR	10	Andy Platt
SR	11	Denis Betts
SR	12	Paul Dixon
LF	13	Ellery Hanley (c)
Substitutions:
IC	14	Shaun Edwards
IC	15	Kevin Ward
IC	16	Paul Loughlin
IC	17	Roy Powell
Coach:
(England) Mal Reilly

FB	1	Gary Belcher
LW	2	Dale Shearer
CE	3	Mal Meninga (c)
CE	4	Laurie Daley
RW	5	Andrew Ettingshausen
FE	6	Cliff Lyons
HB	7	Ricky Stuart
PR	8	Steve Roach
HK	9	Benny Elias
PR	10	Glenn Lazarus
SR	11	Paul Sironen
SR	12	Bob Lindner
LK	13	Brad Mackay
Substitutions:
IC	14	John Cartwright
IC	15	Mark Sargent
IC	16	Des Hasler
IC	17	Greg Alexander
Coach:
(Australia) Bob Fulton

After a tense opening during which neither side gained any clear ascendancy, Dale Shearer made a welcome return to test football when he opened the scoring with a try 18 minutes into the first half after good lead-up play by Lyons, Stuart and Daley had left the flyer with a 35-metre run to the line. Meninga missed the conversion and the only other score was a penalty goal to Lions winger Paul Eastwood after Paul Sironen was penalised for giving Denis Betts a 'facial' in a tackle to leave the score 4–2 in Australia's favour.

The Lions hit back early in the second half with a try to Dixon who broke through Shearer's tackle and was able to score after Mal Meninga and Gary Belcher had fallen off him when they collided with each other. Eastwood hooked the conversion attempt and the Lions led 6–4. Soon after Lions winger Martin Offiah was one of 4 Lions tackling Mal Meninga when the 107 kg Aussie captain came down on Offiah's knee, forcing the flying winger off the field. He was replaced by St. Helens centre Paul Loughlin who was playing his first game in a month after rolling his ankle training for Saints opening game of the Kangaroo Tour. Loughlin went into the centres with Carl Gibson forced out to the wing.

Australia reclaimed the lead thanks to a brilliant team try to Cliff Lyons in his test debut. The ball passed through 12 sets of hands (with Lyons handling it 3 times in the movement) with the Kangaroos refusing to let the ball die before Stuart and Meninga got the ball to Andrew Ettingshausen who raced down the right wing and centre kicked for Lyons to regather and score beside the posts with Garry Schofield clinging to his waist, giving the Kangaroos a 10–6 lead after Meninga landed the conversion.

With just ten minutes left, Great Britain were poised to reclaim The Ashes after twenty years with an intercept try by replacement centre Loughlin late in the match. Ricky Stuart had aimed a pass to Meninga, but Loughlin (called a Giraffe by Bob Fulton) intercepted it on the half way and raced 50 metres to score, though he was kept out wide due to a converging Laurie Daley. After hooking his earlier conversion attempt from almost the same position, Eastwood then asked noted right foot goal kicker Loughlin if he wanted to take the kick, but the out of breath centre declined. The Hull F.C. winger then sliced the pressure conversion attempt to the left of the posts. Had the kick been successful it would have given the Lions a 12–10 lead with time running out.

However the match remained tied at 10–all and after a Garry Schofield touch finder with less than 3 minutes remaining, Great Britain had the Kangaroos pinned only 10 metres out from their own line. After struggling to make ground following the scrum win, on the 4th tackle Ricky Stuart dummied past an exhausted Lee Jackson and ran 75 metres downfield leaving Lions players (including Ellery Hanley) in his wake before passing to Mal Meninga in support (who legally shouldered Carl Gibson out of the way) to complete a length-of-the-field try that sealed the match for Australia and force the series into a decider. Meninga (who had admitted that he had not been happy with his goal kicking on the tour) missed the conversion of his own try, but it wasn't a factor as the siren sounded to end the match seconds after the kick. In a 2025 interview with Australia's Fox League Martin Offiah, who at the time was watching the action on the treatment room television, said that he still believes that with his pace he could have possibly stopped the try from being scored.

Wednesday, 14 November	Hull F.C.	4–34	Australia	The Boulevard, Hull
	Tries: Neil Turner; Goals: Paul Eastwood (0/1)	[ Report]	Tries: Andrew Ettingshausen (2), Des Hasler (2), Kevin Walters (2), Kerrod Walters; Goals: Greg Alexander (3/7)	Attendance: 13,081; Referee: David Campbell; Player of the Match: Allan Langer

Hull F.C.	Australia

FB	1	Richard Gay
RW	2	Paul Eastwood
CE	3	Rob Nolan
CE	4	Brad Webb
LW	5	Neil Turner
SO	6	Greg Mackey (c)
SH	7	Patrick Entat
PR	8	Jon Sharp
HK	9	Lee Jackson
PR	10	Russ Walker
SR	11	Ian Marlow
SR	12	Steve McNamara
LF	13	Andy Dannatt
Substitutions:
IC	14	Mike Dixon
IC	15	Anthony Jackson
IC	16	Brian Blacker
IC	17	Phil Windley
Coach:
(Australia) Noel Cleal (Australia) Brian Smith

FB	1	Greg Alexander
RW	2	Chris Johns
CE	3	Brad Fittler
CE	4	Andrew Ettingshausen
LW	5	Des Hasler
FE	6	Kevin Walters
HB	7	Allan Langer (c)
PR	8	Mark Sargent
HK	9	Kerrod Walters
PR	10	Martin Bella
SR	11	John Cartwright
SR	12	Mark Geyer
LK	13	David Gillespie
Substitutions:
IC	14	Mark Carroll
IC	15
IC	16
IC	17
Coach:
(Australia) Bob Fulton

After a number of tours where the Kangaroos played at least two games in the north-eastern British seaside city, this would be the only game of the tour that the Australian's played in Hull. Although Australian Brian Smith was still officially the Hull coach at this time, his assistant Noel Cleal (a member of the 1986 Kangaroos and a premiership winner with Manly-Warringah under Bob Fulton in 1987) was given the coaching duties for the game. Cleal would take over as Hull coach at the end of the season when Smith moved back to Sydney to coach St George and at the time of this game, Hull were on top of the RFL premiership ladder. In a post match interview, Cleal admitted that he was sitting on the fence in this game. As coach of Hull he wanted his side to win, but he also admitted that it was pleasing to see Australia playing so well with the Ashes decider to be played in 10 days time. Giant forward Mark Carroll returned to the side after suffering a knee injury during a team training session a few days before the first Ashes Test some 3 weeks earlier.

Sunday, 18 November	Widnes	8–15	Australia	Naughton Park, Widnes
	Tries: Jonathan Davies; Goals: Jonathan Davies (2/2)	[ Report]	Tries: Dale Shearer, Gary Belcher, Greg Alexander; Goals: Gary Belcher (1/2); Mal Meninga (0/2); Greg Alexander (0/1); Field Goals: Gary Belcher (1)	Attendance: 14,666; Referee: John Kendrew; Player of the Match: Gary Belcher

Widnes	Australia

FB	1	Jonathan Davies
RW	2	John Devereux
CE	3	Andy Currier
CE	4	Darren Wright
LW	5	Harvey Howard
SO	6	Tony Myler
SH	7	David Hulme
PR	8	Kurt Sorenson (c)
HK	9	Phil McKenzie
PR	10	Joey Grima
SR	11	Emosi Koloto
SR	12	Richard Eyres
LF	13	Les Holliday
Substitutions:
IC	14	Paul Hulme
IC	15	Esene Faimalo
IC	16
IC	17
Coach:
(England) Doug Laughton

FB	1	Gary Belcher
LW	2	Greg Alexander
CE	3	Mal Meninga (c)
CE	4	Dale Shearer
RW	5	Andrew Ettingshausen
FE	6	Cliff Lyons
HB	7	Allan Langer
PR	8	Steve Roach
HK	9	Kerrod Walters
PR	10	Glenn Lazarus
SR	11	Paul Sironen
SR	12	Bob Lindner
LK	13	Brad Mackay
Substitutions:
IC	14	Chris Johns
IC	15	David Gillespie
IC	16	Martin Bella
IC	17	Des Hasler
Coach:
(Australia) Bob Fulton

The game against Widnes was shrouded in controversy. Midway through the second half Paul Sironen was taken from the field with an eye injury and Kangaroos team doctor Nathan Gibbs diagnosed a scratched retina. During the game, Australian captain Mal Meninga had reluctantly made a complaint to referee John Kedrew about Australian players being poked in the eyes when being tackled, as had happened to Sironen (the alleged culprit was Widnes captain Kurt Sorensen who later denied any deliberate wrongdoing). Kangaroos team management and coach Bob Fulton were furious about the incident after the game, although the matter went no further due to a lack of any conclusive video evidence. The injury put Sironen in doubt for the up-coming third and deciding Ashes test in Leeds.

The game against the reigning World Club champions was a tight one on what proved to be the coldest day of the tour in England. Led by their inspirational 'Welsh Wizard' fullback, dual rugby international Jonathan Davies, Widnes pushed the Kangaroos to the closest club game score of the tour with the Kangaroos finally winning 15–8 thanks to tries to man of the match Gary Belcher (who also kicked a goal after Meninga had missed with his 3 attempts as well as adding the tour's only field goal), Dale Shearer and Greg Alexander. "Brandy" played the game at Naughton Park, the scene of Australia's last non-test loss in England back in 1978, on the wing with Shearer moved to the centres in place of Laurie Daley who was being kept under wraps until the third test due to his broken right hand.

==== Third Test ====
In the third and final test of The Ashes series, Australia kept alive their series streak (not having lost The Ashes since Great Britain won in Australia in 1970 and not having lost them in England since 1959), with a 14–0 win in front of a packed Elland Road in Leeds. Australia ran in three tries to nil with Mal Meninga, Andrew Ettingshausen and Benny Elias all crossing the line while the Lions rarely threatened the Kangaroos line in the wet and slippery conditions.

Kangaroos captain Mal Meninga became just the third Australian to score a try in each test of an Ashes series following on from legendary try-scoring winger Ken Irvine in 1962 and 1963, and the most unlikely of the trio, front-row forward Sam Backo in 1988.

Bob Fulton made only one change to his side from Old Trafford with David Gillespie coming onto the bench for John Cartwright. Mal Reilly did similar to his former Manly-Warringah teammate and only made changes to his bench with Jonathan Davies returning to the Test line up replacing Paul Loughlin, and Mike Gregory returning to the side in place of Shaun Edwards.

This test also doubled as a round game of the 1989–1992 Rugby League World Cup.

Saturday, 24 November

Great Britain	0–14	Australia
Tries: Goals:		Tries: Andrew Ettingshausen; Mal Meninga; Ben Elias; Goals: Mal Meninga (1/3)

Elland Road, Leeds
Attendance: 32,500
Referee: Alain Sablayrolles (France)
Player of the Match: Ricky Stuart

Great Britain	Australia

FB	1	Steve Hampson
RW	2	Paul Eastwood
RC	3	Daryl Powell
LC	4	Carl Gibson
LW	5	Martin Offiah
SO	6	Garry Schofield
SH	7	Andy Gregory
PR	8	Karl Harrison
HK	9	Lee Jackson
PR	10	Andy Platt
SR	11	Denis Betts
SR	12	Paul Dixon
LK	13	Ellery Hanley (c)
Substitutions:
IC	14	Mike Gregory
IC	15	Roy Powell
IC	16	Jonathan Davies
IC	17	Kevin Ward
Coach:
(England) Mal Reilly

FB	1	Gary Belcher
LW	2	Dale Shearer
RC	3	Mal Meninga (c)
LC	4	Laurie Daley
RW	5	Andrew Ettingshausen
FE	6	Cliff Lyons
HB	7	Ricky Stuart
PR	8	Steve Roach
HK	9	Benny Elias
PR	10	Glenn Lazarus
SR	11	Paul Sironen
SR	12	Bob Lindner
LF	13	Brad Mackay
Substitutions:
IC	14	David Gillespie
IC	15	Des Hasler
IC	16	Mark Sargent
IC	17	Greg Alexander
Coach:
(Australia) Bob Fulton

The deciding test was played in wet and slippery conditions, though the Kangaroos handled the tricky conditions better than the home side.

Australia's first try to Andrew Ettingshausen came when the Kangaroos caught the Lions short in their defensive line. Centre Carl Gibson had received a head knock and was in the hands of the trainers. While he had left the field, the touch judge could not get the attention of Sablayrolles and wouldn't allow his replacement Jonathan Davies to come on and make up the numbers. Seeing that the Lions were short in the line which forced them to come infield, Ricky Stuart sent a 25-metre, pinpoint pass out to Ettingshausen, which allowed him to skirt around Martin Offiah (who had to turn and chase) to score in the corner before Offiah and Steve Hampson pushed his legs into touch. This proved to be the only points of the first half after Meninga missed the difficult sideline conversion.

Later in the second half, Meninga scored after Garry Schofield had raced out the Lions defensive line to try for an intercept. However the ball got to Cliff Lyons first and he immediately exploited the gap where Schofield should have been to send Meninga back inside to score untouched under the posts. In the Elland Road grandstand, Lions coach Mal Reilly and his assistant Phil Larder could only look on in disbelief. Schofield, who was nicknamed "The Poacher" due to his habit of racing out of the line looking for intercepts, had been warned before the game by both Reilly and Larder (as well as his own club coach, former Lions captain David Ward) not to race out of the defensive line as the Australians were capable of exploiting any gap it created, which is exactly what happened. Meninga's easy conversion of his own try gave Australia what would be a match winning 10–0 lead in the conditions. With only minutes remaining, a 40 metre Laurie Daley break into the British half saw Ettingshausen in support. While evading Hampson, Daley got an awkward pass away to ET who was brought down in a desperate tackle only 10 metres from the line by Jonathan Davies. From there surprisingly, prop forward Steve Roach had managed to get downfield to dummy half and in a role reversal, fed Benny Elias on his right with Benny putting the result beyond doubt by diving over in the corner. Not surprisingly, Meninga missed the sideline conversion leaving the scores at 14–0.

Ricky Stuart received the Man of the Match award while Bob Lindner was voted the Kangaroos player of the series.

== France ==
Tuesday, 27 November	President's XIII	18–46	Australia	Corbeil Essones Stadium, Paris
	Tries: Marginet (2), Ramirez, Lope; Goals: Stephen (1)		Tries: Greg Alexander (2), Brad Fittler (2), Chris Johns, Des Hasler, Kevin Walters, Allan Langer, Mark Sargent; Goals: Greg Alexander (3); Dale Shearer (1)	Attendance: 3,000; Referee: M. Millett

Australia: Greg Alexander, Dale Shearer, Brad Fittler, Chris Johns, Des Hasler, Kevin Walters, Allan Langer (c), Mark Sargent, Kerrod Walters, Martin Bella, Mark Carroll, Mark Geyer, David Gillespie

Thursday, 29 November	France B	6–78	Australia	Georges Livet Stadium, Lyon
	Tries: Eric Van Brussel; Goals: Chrismanovitch (1/2)	[ Report]	Tries: Greg Alexander (5), Gary Belcher (2), Brad Fittler (2), Allan Langer, Mark Geyer, Mark Carroll, Mark Sargent; Goals: Greg Alexander (13/13)	Attendance: 2,000; Referee: M. Agali; Player of the Match: Greg Alexander

Australia: Greg Alexander, Gary Belcher, Brad Fittler, Chris Johns, Des Hasler, Kevin Walters, Allan Langer (c), Mark Sargent, Kerrod Walters, Martin Bella, Mark Carroll, Mark Geyer, David Gillespie

Fullback Greg Alexander (Test fullback Gary Belcher actually played on the wing) had a field day against the French B team in Lyon, crossing for 5 tries and kicking 13 goals from 13 attempts for a personal score of 46 points which saw him become the first player to score over 100 points on the tour (he ended the game with 104 points for the tour).

=== French Tests ===
==== First test ====
Sunday, 2 December 1990

France	4–60	Australia
Tries: David Fraisse Goals: Michel Roses (0/1)		Tries: Greg Alexander (3); Gary Belcher (2); Andrew Ettingshausen (2); Paul Sironen; Dale Shearer; David Gillespie; Glenn Lazarus; Goals; Greg Alexander (7/8); Mal Meninga (1/3)

Parc de Sports, Avignon
Attendance: 2,200
Referee: John Holdsworth (England)
Player of the Match: Greg Alexander

France	Australia

FB	1	Michel Roses
RW	2	Alain Bouzer
RC	3	Serge Bret
LC	4	Denis Bienès
LW	5	Cyril Pons
SO	6	David Fraisse
SH	7	Patrick Entat (c)
PR	8	Serge Titeux
HK	9	Thierry Valéro
PR	10	Christian Calvo
SR	11	Daniel Divet
SR	12	Daniel Verdès
LK	13	Jacques Moliner
Substitutions:
IC	14	Marc Tisseyre
IC	15	Patrick Marginet
IC	16	Jacques Rouscayrol
IC	17
Coach:
(France) Jacques Jorda

FB	1	Gary Belcher
RW	2	Andrew Ettingshausen
RC	3	Mal Meninga (c)
LC	4	Laurie Daley
LW	5	Dale Shearer
FE	6	Cliff Lyons
HB	7	Ricky Stuart
PR	8	Steve Roach
HK	9	Benny Elias
PR	10	Glenn Lazarus
SR	11	Paul Sironen
SR	12	David Gillespie
LF	13	Brad Mackay
Substitutions:
IC	14	Des Hasler
IC	15	Greg Alexander
IC	16	Mark Geyer
IC	17	Mark Sargent
Coach:
(Australia) Bob Fulton

The Kangaroos easily accounted for a gallant, but out-classed French side in the first test in Avignon. Replacement halfback Greg Alexander, who came on after only 15 minutes of the first half for Ricky Stuart who left the field feeling ill, continued his good form in France and crossed for a hat-trick of tries. He also took over the goal kicking from Mal Meninga and kicked 7/8 giving him a personal points haul of 26 points as the Kangaroos won their 8th straight game against France 60–4.

The only change to the Kangaroos line up from the third test against Great Britain was David Gillespie coming off the bench to replace an injured Bob Lindner, with giant Penrith back row forward Mark Geyer coming onto the bench for his test match debut.

Thursday, 29 November	Languedoc-Roussillon	9–38	Australia	Stade d'Albert Domec, Carcassonne
	Tries: Goals: Gilbert (4); Field Goa: Gilbert	[ Report]	Tries: Brad Fittler (2), Greg Alexander, Dale Shearer, Andrew Ettingshausen, Allan Langer, John Cartwright, Mark Sargent; Goals: Greg Alexander (3)	Attendance: 2,000; Referee: M. Chamfreau

Australia: Greg Alexander, Dale Shearer, Chris Johns, Andrew Ettingshausen, Des Hasler, Brad Fittler, Allan Langer (c), Mark Sargent, Kevin Walters, Martin Bella, Mark Geyer, Mark Carroll, John Cartwright

==== Second Test ====
9 December 1990

France	10–34	Australia
Tries: Patrick Entat; Cyril Pons Goals; Marc Tisseyre (1/2)		Tries: Brad Mackay; Andrew Ettingshausen; Mal Meninga; Steve Roach; Dale Shearer; Greg Alexander; Goals; Greg Alexander (3/7)

Stade Gilbert Brutus, Perpignan
Attendance: 3,428
Referee: John Holdsworth (England)
Player of the Match: Cliff Lyons

France	Australia

FB	1	David Fraisse
RW	2	Alain Bouzer
RC	3	Serge Bret
LC	4	Guy Delaunay
LW	5	Cyril Pons
SO	6	Jacques Moliner
SH	7	Patrick Entat (c)
PR	8	Marc Tisseyre
HK	9	Thierry Valéro
PR	10	Thiery Buttignol
SR	11	Francis Lope
SR	12	Daniel Divet
LK	13	Daniel Verdès
Substitutions:
IC	14	Denis Bienès
IC	15	Patrick Marginet
IC	16
IC	17
Coach:
(France) Jacques Jorda

FB	1	Gary Belcher
RW	2	Andrew Ettingshausen
RC	3	Mal Meninga (c)
LC	4	Dale Shearer
LW	5	Greg Alexander
FE	6	Cliff Lyons
HB	7	Ricky Stuart
PR	8	Steve Roach
HK	9	Benny Elias
PR	10	Glenn Lazarus
SR	11	Paul Sironen
SR	12	Bob Lindner
LF	13	Brad Mackay
Substitutions:
IC	14	Chris Johns
IC	15	Mark Sargent
IC	16	David Gillespie
IC	17	Des Hasler
Coach:
(Australia) Bob Fulton

Against an out-classed French team, Kangaroos coach Bob Fulton allowed himself the luxury of fiddling with the test side for the final game of the tour. Laurie Daley was ruled out with a hamstring injury which saw Dale Shearer move to the centres with Greg Alexander selected to play in the unfamiliar position of wing. Bob Lindner returned to the side which saw David Gillespie move back to the bench while Mark Geyer was also ruled out with injury and was replaced by speedy Brisbane Broncos outside back Chris Johns for his test debut.

During the first half, French fullback David Fraisse showed surprising pace to run down Kangaroos speedsters Dale Shearer and Andrew Ettingshausen, pulling off try saving tackles on both.

After scoring a first half try, Greg Alexander performed a gymnastic backflip (Alexander claimed he had wanted to do that during one of the English games but felt the timing hadn't been right given the circumstances with Australia under pressure due to their first test loss). The Kangaroos won the second test 34–10 against a much more committed French team at the Stade Gilbert Brutus in Perpignan.

== Statistics ==
Leading try scorer

- 15 by Andrew Ettingshausen

Leading point scorer

- 156 by Greg Alexander (14 tries, 50 goals)

Largest attendance

- 54,569 – First test vs Great Britain at Wembley Stadium

Largest club game attendance

- 24,814 – Wigan vs Australia at Central Park

Bob Lindner was named the player's player of the tour.
