= 1994 France rugby league tour of Oceania =

The 1994 French rugby league Oceania tour was a three test tour by the France national rugby league team. The French team played single tests against Papua New Guinea, Australia and Fiji, losing all three games.

== Team ==
The French were coached by Jean-Christophe Vergeynst and captained by veteran halfback Patrick Entat.

- Patrick Acroue
- Theo Anast
- Ezzedine Attia
- Cyril Baudouin
- Pascal Bomati
- Pierre Chamorin
- David Despin
- Patrick Entat
- Franck Esponda
- David Fraisse
- Jean Frison
- Jean-Marc Garcia
- Charles Giorgi
- Christophe Grandjean
- Georges Grandjean
- Bernard Llong
- Frantz Martial
- Christophe Martinez
- Claude Sirvent
- Stephane Tena
- Patrick Torreilles
- Thierry Valero
- Jean-Marc Vincent

== Papua New Guinea vs France ==
This would be Papua New Guinea's 5th test win in their 34th test (and their second win over France) since gaining test match status in 1975.

26 June 1994

Papua New Guinea	29 – 22	France
Tries: Tuiyo Evei; Stanley Gene; David Gomia; James Mirivi; James Naipo; Goals: Tuksy Karu (3); Ric Emmanuel (1); Field Goals: Stanley Gene		Try: David Fraisse; Jean-Marc Garcia; Bernard Llong; Christophe Martinez Goals: Patrick Torreilles (3)

Lloyd Robson Oval, Port Moresby
Attendance: 5,000
Referee: Dennis Hale (New Zealand)

Papua New Guinea	France

FB	1	David Buko
RW	2	James Mirivi
RC	3	David Gomia
LC	4	Phillip Boge (c)
LW	5	Ric Emmanuel
FE	6	Tuksy Karu
HB	7	Adrian Lam
PR	8	Ben Biri
HK	9	Ronald Vue
PR	10	Tuiyo Evei
SR	11	Max Tiri
SR	12	James Naipao
LK	13	James Sikai
Substitutions:
IC	14	Stanley Gene
IC	15	Nande Yer
IC	16	Luke Waldiat
IC	17	Matthew Yidi
Coach:

FB	1	Jean Frison
RW	2	Frantz Martial
RC	3	David Despin
LC	4	David Fraisse
LW	5	Jean-Marc Garcia
SO	6	Pierre Chamorin
SH	7	Patrick Entat (c)
PR	8	Bernard Llong
HK	9	Patrick Torreilles
PR	10	Theo Anast
SR	11	Ezzedine Attia
SR	12	Franck Esponda
LK	13	Thierry Valero
Substitutions:
IC	14	Stephane Tena
IC	15	Georges Grandjean
IC	16	Charles Giorgi
IC	17	Christophe Martinez
Coach:
(France) Jean-Christophe Vergeynst

== Australia vs France ==
For the Australians, Brett Mullins, David Fairleigh, Tim Brasher, Paul McGregor and Mark Hohn all made their test debut, though Brasher had been Australia's fullback in the 1992 World Cup final at Wembley Stadium (at the time, tests and World Cup games were counted separately in a players records).

Although the name had been used for 86 years, this was the first test other than during a Kangaroo Tour where the Australian team was officially called The Kangaroos.

6 July 1994

Australia	58 – 0	France
Tries: Steve Renouf (3); Ian Roberts (2); Laurie Daley (2); Mal Meninga; Brett Mullins; Andrew Ettingshausen; Paul McGregor; Brad Fittler; Goals: Mal Meninga (5/10); Tim Brasher (0/2)		Try: Goals:

Parramatta Stadium, Sydney
Attendance: 27,318
Referee: Dennis Hale (New Zealand)
Player of the Match: Laurie Daley

Australia	France

FB	1	Brett Mullins
LW	2	Michael Hancock
RC	3	Mal Meninga (c)
LC	4	Steve Renouf
RW	5	Andrew Ettingshausen
FE	6	Laurie Daley
HB	7	Allan Langer
PR	8	Ian Roberts
HK	9	Steve Walters
PR	10	Paul Harragon
SR	11	Paul Sironen
SR	12	David Fairleigh
LF	13	Brad Fittler
Substitutions:
IC	14	Paul McGregor
IC	15	Tim Brasher
IC	16	Brad Mackay
IC	17	Mark Hohn
Coach:
(Australia) Bob Fulton

FB	1	Jean Frison
LW	2	Claude Sirvent
LC	3	David Fraisse
RC	4	David Despin
RW	5	Jean-Marc Garcia
SO	6	Pierre Chamorin
SH	7	Patrick Entat (c)
PR	8	Theo Anast
HK	9	Patrick Torreilles
PR	10	Bernard Llong
SR	11	Patrick Acroue
SR	12	Ezzedine Attia
LF	14	Stephane Tena
Substitutions:
IC	13	Jean-Marc Vincent
IC	15	Cyril Baudouin
IC	16	Christophe Martinez
IC	17	Charles Giorgi
Coach:
(France) Jean-Christophe Vergeynst

In the French team's first test in Australia since 1990 and in what would prove to be Australian captain Mal Meninga's final test in Australia after announcing that he would retire at the end of 1994, the Australian Kangaroos racked up a record winning margin in the first ever test match at Parramatta Stadium (and the first test in Sydney played at a suburban ground rather than a major venue) by defeating the hapless French 58–0. The scoreline could well have been higher (as much as 72–0) had Meninga (5/10) and Tim Brasher (0/2) been more accurate with their goal kicking.

Following the disaster of France's 1981 Australasian tour where the standard of the French teams play had dropped alarmingly resulting in poor attendances for the tests at Lang Park in Brisbane and the Sydney Cricket Ground, the Australian Rugby League had ruled that until they improved their game, the Australian team would no longer play tests against the French in the two capital cities. The 1990 test, France's first in Australia since 1981 (following the cancelled 1987 tour) had been played on a freezing night in the New South Wales country town of Parkes in front of a capacity crowd of 12,384 fans at the Pioneer Oval. The attendance for that game, and that it was Mal Meninga's last test match in Australia, saw the ARL relax their stance and allow the game to be played in Sydney.

Despite the French team not being regarded as a top line international team any more (this was France's 11th loss in a row in all tests since 1992 and their 10th loss in a row to Australia since 1981), the game was played in front of a ground record attendance of 27,318 which as would remain the record attendance for the venue until it was demolished in 2017. This was also the highest attendance for an Australia vs France test since 54,290 attended the 1968 World Cup final at the Sydney Cricket Ground.

This was the only rugby league test match played in Australia during 1994. At the end of the year the Australian's would embark on their successful 1994 Kangaroo tour of Great Britain and France during which they again defeated France 74–0 in Béziers. At the time the 74–0 score was a world record test match victory eclipsing the 58–0 win here in Sydney. Of this test team, only reserve forward Mark Hohn was not selected to the 1994 Kangaroo Tour.

France would not play another test against Australia until 2004 while they would not play again in Australia until the 2008 Rugby League World Cup.

== Fiji vs France ==
9 July 1994

Fiji	20 – 12	France
Tries: Orisi Cavuilati; Ropate Senikuraciri; Illiesa Toga; Ulaiasi Wainidroa; Goals: Noa Nayacaklou (1); Ropate Senikuraciri (1)		Try: Christophe Grandjean; Claude Sirvent Goals: Pierre Chamorin (1); Patrick Torreilles (1)

National Stadium, Suva
Attendance: 5,000
Referee: Graham Annesley (Australia)

Fiji	France

FB	1	Veramu Dikidikilati
LW	2	Orisi Cavuilati
RC	3	Livai Nalagilagi
LC	4	Fili Seru
RW	5	Noa Nadruku
FE	6	Noa Nayacaklou
HB	7	Ropate Senikuraciri
PR	8	Voate Vasekavu
HK	9	Mesake Seavula
PR	10	James Pickering (c)
SR	11	Ulaiasi Wainidroa
SR	12	Pio Nakubuwai
LK	13	Samuela Marayawa
Substitutions:
IC	14	Illiesa Toga
IC	15	Jioji Vatubua
IC	16	Iliesa Nakailagi
IC	17	Kaleveti Naisoro
Coach:
(Fiji) Pauliasi Tabulutu

FB	1	Jean Frison
RW	2	Frantz Martial
RC	3	David Despin
LC	4	David Fraisse
LW	5	Claude Sirvent
SO	6	Pierre Chamorin
SH	7	Patrick Entat (c)
PR	8	Bernard Llong
HK	9	Patrick Torreilles
PR	10	Theo Anast
SR	11	Ezzedine Attia
SR	12	Christophe Grandjean
LK	13	Thierry Valero
Substitutions:
IC	14	Stephane Tena
IC	15	Cyril Baudouin
IC	16	Charles Giorgi
IC	17	Pascal Bomati
Coach:
(France) Jean-Christophe Vergeynst

In what was Fiji's first official rugby league test match, they defeated the French team 20–12 at the National Stadium in Fiji's capital city of Suva.

== Aftermath ==
The French team were in the grip of a 22 match losing streak (which included two drawn tests), not having won a test since defeating Papua New Guinea 28–14 in Carcassonne on 24 November 1991. They would not win another rugby league test match until defeating South Africa 30–17 in Arles on 6 December 1997.
