= 1985–1988 Rugby League World Cup players =

The 1985–1988 Rugby League World Cup involved players from the national rugby league football teams of five countries: Australia, France, Great Britain, New Zealand and Papua New Guinea. As the World Cup was played over four years during normal international tours, these groups of players never assembled in one place as an entire squad.

== Australia ==
- Coaches: (Australia) Terry Fearnley (1985) (Australia) Don Furner (1986–88)
1. Garry Jack
2. John Ribot
3. Dale Shearer
4. Andrew Ettingshausen
5. Andrew Farrar
6. Mark McGaw
7. Michael O'Connor
8. Peter Jackson
9. Tony Currie
10. John Ferguson
11. Steve Ella
12. Gene Miles
13. Alan Langer
14. Mal Meninga
15. Chris Mortimer
16. Les Kiss
17. Wally Lewis(C)
18. Des Hasler
19. Steve Roach
20. Peter Tunks
21. Royce Simmons
22. Gavin Miller
23. David Gillespie
24. Martin Bella
25. Greg Conescu
26. Paul Sironen
27. Bryan Niebling
28. Paul Vautin
29. Peter Wynn
30. Noel Cleal
31. Paul Dunn
32. Benny Elias
33. Sam Backo
34. Wally Fullerton-Smith
35. Gary Belcher
36. Chris Close
37. Peter Sterling
38. Royce Simmons
39. Greg Dowling
40. Wayne Pearce
41. Steve Folkes
42. Bob Lindner
43. Les Davidson
44. Terry Lamb

== France ==
- Coaches: (Australia) Tas Baitieri and (France) Guy Vigouroux
1. Gilles Dumas (Saint-Gaudens) - Fullback
2. Jean-Philippe Pougeau (Saint-Estève) - Fullback
3. Patrick Wosniak (Saint-Estève) - Fullback
4. Guy Delaunay (Saint-Estève) - Centre
5. David Fraisse (Le Pontet) - Fullback/Centre/Wing/Five-eights
6. Jacques Moliner (Lézignan) - Lock forward
7. Frédéric Bourrel (Carcassonne)
8. Sébastien Rodriguez (XIII Catalan)
9. Serge Pallarès (XIII Catalan)
10. Mathieu Khedimi (Saint-Estève) - Hooker/Lock forward
11. Pierre Ailleres (Toulouse) - Prop
12. Alain Maury (Villeneuve)
13. Philippe Fourquet (Toulouse) - Wing
14. Daniel Divet (Carcassonne) - Second row
15. Francis Laforgue (XIII Catalan) - Centre/Five-eights
16. Pascal Laroche (Villeneuve) - Wing
17. Hugues Ratier (Lézignan) - Centre/Winger
18. Patrick Entat (Avignon) - Scrum-half
19. Cyril Pons (Saint-Gaudens) - Winger
20. Denis Bergé (Le Pontet) - Centre
21. Roger Palisses (Saint-Estève) - Centre/Winger
22. Didier Couston (Le Pontet) - Winger
23. Christian Scicchitano (Carpentras)
24. Dominique Espugna (Lézignan) - Five-eights
25. Patrick Baco (XIII Catalan) - Hooker
26. Yannick Mantese (Nantes XIII) - Hooker
27. Marc Palanques (Le Pontet) - Second row
28. Bruno Guasch (XIII Catalan) - Lock forward
29. Max Chantal (Villeneuve) - Prop
30. Thierry Bernabé (Le Pontet) - Lock forward
31. Serge Titeux (Le Pontet) - Prop
32. Marc Tisseyre (Pamiers)
33. Pierre Montgaillard (XIII Catalan)
34. Patrick Rocci (Le Pontet) - Five-eights
35. Guy Laforgue (XIII Catalan) - Second row (C)
36. Daniel Verdès (Villeneuve)
37. Philippe Gestas (Saint-Gaudens)
38. Yves Storer (Saint-Gaudens)
39. André Perez (XIII Catalan)
40. Jean-Luc Rabot (Villeneuve)

== Great Britain ==
- Coach: (United Kingdom) Maurice Bamford/ (United Kingdom) Malcolm Reilly
1. Mick Burke
2. Steve Hampson
3. Des Drummond
4. Martin Offiah
5. Mark Forster
6. Phil Ford
7. Paul Loughlin
8. David Stephenson
9. Chris Burton
10. Garry Schofield
11. Jeff Grayshon
12. David Watkinson
13. Kevin Ward
14. John Fieldhouse
15. Lee Crooks
16. Andy Goodway
17. Tony Myler
18. Paul Groves
19. Brian Case
20. Roy Haggerty
21. Paul Medley
22. David Hulme
23. Paul Hulme
24. Shaun Edwards
25. Mike Gregory
26. Kevin Beardmore
27. David Hobbs
28. Ian Potter
29. Harry Pinner (C)
30. Lee Crooks
31. Chris Arkwright
32. Keith England
33. Gary Connolly
34. David Creasser
35. John Woods
36. Karl Fairbank
37. Paul Dixon

== New Zealand ==
- Coach:
- (New Zealand) Graham Lowe (1985-86)
- (New Zealand) Tony Gordon (1986-88)

Player	Position	Date of birth	Club	Games	Points
Mark Graham (c)	Second-row	29 September 1955	North Sydney	6	8
Fred Ah Kuoi	Five-eighth	7 June 1956	Hull FC	2	0
Dean Bell	Centre	29 April 1962	Eastern Suburbs	6	0
Peter Brown	Prop	1 September 1961	Hunslet FC	4	36
Shane Cooper	Centre	26 May 1960	St Helens	5	0
Riki Cowan	Prop	28 December 1963	Auckland	1	0
Marty Crequer	Wing	28 June 1965	Canterbury	1	0
Mark Elia	Wing	25 December 1962	St Helens	2	0
Esene Faimalo	Prop	11 October 1966	Canterbury	1	0
Olsen Filipaina	Five-eighth	23 April 1957	North Sydney	4	16
Gary Freeman	Halfback	4 December 1962	Castleford	5	8
Clayton Friend	Halfback	22 March 1962	North Sydney	6	8
Barry Harvey	Hooker	23 August 1964	Taranaki	1	0
Mark Horo	Second-row	27 March 1963	Auckland	3	0
Shane Horo	Wing	19 May 1960	Leigh	2	12
Kevin Iro	Centre	24 May 1968	Wigan	3	16
Tony Iro	Wing	30 May 1967	Wigan	1	4
Gary Kemble	Fullback	23 August 1956	Hull FC	5	4
James Leuluai	Centre	4 February 1957	Hull FC	4	4
Hugh McGahan	Lock	15 November 1961	Eastern Suburbs	5	12
Gary Mercer	Fullback	22 June 1966	Bradford	3	8
Dane O'Hara	Wing	15 November 1953	Hull FC	5	0
Ron O'Regan	Centre	4 July 1960	Auckland	3	0
Gary Prohm	Wing	3 October 1956	Eastern Suburbs	3	0
Joe Ropati	Centre	10 February 1963	Warrington	3	4
Adrian Shelford	Prop	4 January 1964	Wigan	4	4
Dane Sorensen	Prop	4 October 1955	Cronulla-Sutherland	2	2
Kurt Sorensen	Second-row	8 November 1956	Widnes	5	4
Sam Stewart	Second-row	5 December 1962	Wellington	4	0
Howie Tamati	Hooker	3 January 1953	Taranaki	1	0
Kevin Tamati	Prop	21 September 1953	Warrington	2	0
Brent Todd	Prop	5 December 1964	Canberra	2	0
Wayne Wallace	Hooker	30 May 1959	Canterbury	6	8
Darrell Williams	Fullback	30 August 1963	Manly Warringah	5	12
Owen Wright	Second-row	15 January 1957	Auckland	4	0

== Papua New Guinea ==
- Coach: (Australia) Barry Wilson/ (Papua New Guinea) Skerry Palanga
1. Dairi Kovae
2. Ipisa Wanega
3. Joe Katsir
4. Lauta Atoi
5. Bal Numapo
6. Mafu Kerekere
7. Darius Haili
8. Mea Morea
9. Tony Kila (C)
10. Joe Tep
11. Roy Heni
12. Ati Lomutopa
13. Bobby Ako
14. Isaac Rop
15. Michael Matmillo
16. Yer Bom
17. Bernard Waketsi
18. Mathias Kambra
19. Arebo Taumaku
20. Gideon Kouoru
21. Tuiyo Evei
22. Haoda Kouoru
23. Thomas Rombuk
24. Ngala Lapan
25. Kepi Saea
26. Noah Andy
27. Daroa Ben-Moide
28. Arnold Krewanty
29. David Gauis
30. Mathias Kitimun
31. Joe Gispe
32. Andrew Kuno
33. Sam Karara
