= 1990–91 French Championship season =

Final table of the 1990–91 season of the French Championship of Rugby League.

== Final table ==
	Team	Pld	Pts
1	St-Estève	22	60
2	Carcassonne	22	
3	XIII Catalan	22	52
4	RC Saint-Gaudens	22	47
5	Avignon	22	46
6	Toulouse Olympique	22	45
7	Villeneuve-sur-Lot	22	44
8	Pia	22	42
9	Pamiers	22	41
10	FC Lézignan	22	38
11	Carpentras	22	34
12	Limoux	22	23

== Final ==
Teams	Saint-Gaudens - Villeneuve-sur-Lot
Score	10-8
Date	26 May 1991
Venue	Stadium Municipal, Toulouse
Referee	Claude Alba
Line-up
Saint-Gaudens	John Maguire, Cyril Pons, Philippe Fourquet, Gilles Dumas (C), Chris Hastings, Robert Viscay, Théo Anast, Yves Storer, Gérard Boyals, Richard Clarke, Denis Bienès, Claude Sirvent, Yves Allègre; Replacements : Patrick Cowel, Peter Martin, Nassim Kebdani, Lionel Garrigues; Coach: Pierre Surre
Villeneuve-sur-Lot	Daniel Calvet, Patrice Campana, Michel Balette, David Despin, Mark Wakefield, Christophe Delbert, Small, Antoine Lopes, Jean-Luc Rabot (C), Bernard Planté, Daniel Verdès, Jean-Bernard Saumitou, Thierry Matter; Replacements : Hurst, Bayssieres, Monbet, Vareille; Player-Coach: Mark Wakefield
Scorers
Saint-Gaudens	1 try Clarke, 1 conversion Hastings, 2 penalties Hastings
Saint-Estève	1 try Campana, 1 conversion Balette, 1 penalty Balette
