= 1992 Rugby League World Cup final =

Great Britain (United Kingdom)	Australia
(RFL)	(ARL)
6	10
	1	2	Total
GBR	6	0	6
AUS	4	6	10
- Date: 24 October 1992
- Stadium: Wembley Stadium
- Location: London, England
- Man of the Match: Steve Walters
- Referee: Dennis Hale (New Zealand)
- Attendance: 73,631

Broadcast partners
- Broadcasters: BBC (United Kingdom) Nine Network (Australia)
- Commentators: Ray French (BBC); Alex Murphy (BBC); Ray Warren (Nine); Peter Sterling (Nine); Paul Vautin (Nine) Chris Bombolas (Nine)

The 1992 Rugby League World Cup final was the conclusive game of the 1989–1992 Rugby League World Cup tournament and was played between Great Britain and Australia on 24 October 1992 at Wembley Stadium in London, England. Australia won the final by 10 points to 6 in front of an international record crowd of 73,631. Australia, the defending champions, won the Rugby League World Cup for the 7th time.

The crowd of 73,631 at Wembley set a new international rugby league attendance record, eclipsing the previous record of 70,204 established during the first test of the 1932 Ashes series at the Sydney Cricket Ground. This record was eventually broken by the 2013 Rugby League World Cup Final, which drew a sellout crowd of 74,468 at Old Trafford.

== Background ==
Key to colours in group tables
Advances to the Final

Team	Played	Won	Drawn	Lost	For	Against	Difference	Points
Australia	8	8	0	0	236	68	+168	16
Great Britain	8	5	0	3	215	79	+136	10
New Zealand	8	5	0	3	203	120	+83	10
France	8	2	0	6	80	247	−167	4
Papua New Guinea	8	0	0	8	84	304	−220	0

=== Great Britain ===
The Mal Reilly coached Great Britain started their World Cup campaign on 11 November 1989 when they defeated New Zealand 10–6 at Central Park in Wigan. Until the Final, The Lions won another 4 games while losing 3.

Nine of the 17 selected players for the Lions were from the 1992 RFL champions Wigan.

==== Results ====
Opposing Team	For	Against	Date	Venue	Attendance	Stage
New Zealand	10	6	11 November 1989	Central Park, Wigan	20,346	Group Stage
Papua New Guinea	40	8	2 June 1990	Lloyd Robson Oval, Port Moresby	7,837	Group Stage
New Zealand	18	21	15 July 1990	Addington Showground, Christchurch	3,133	Group Stage
Australia	0	14	24 November 1990	Elland Road, Leeds	32,500	Group Stage
France	45	10	27 January 1991	Stade Gilbert Brutus, Perpignan	3,965	Group Stage
Papua New Guinea	56	4	9 November 1991	Central Park, Wigan	4,193	Group Stage
France	36	0	7 March 1992	The Boulevard, Hull	5,250	Group Stage
Australia	10	16	3 July 1992	Lang Park, Brisbane	32,313	Group Stage

=== Australia ===
Australia began their World Cup campaign with a 22–14 win over New Zealand in the third test of the 1989 Trans-Tasman series in Auckland on 23 July 1989. The Bob Fulton coached Kangaroos would win all 8 of their qualifying games.

Seven of the players selected for Australia were members of the Brisbane Broncos 1992 NSWRL premiership winning team.

Australia were the defending World Cup Champions and had won all three World Cup finals since 1975. The Kangaroos had won the 1988 Rugby League World Cup final 25–12 over New Zealand at Eden Park in Auckland.

In the fortnight prior to the World Cup final (following the 1992 NSWRL Grand Final), the Australians embarked on a mini three game tour of England, essentially using the games as selection trial for the Final at Wembley. The Australians wore a non-traditional mostly white jumper with a green and gold diamond pattern in the shape of Kit supplier Umbro.

Game	Date	Result	Venue	Attendance
1	9 October	Australia def. Huddersfield 66–2	Leeds Road, Huddersfield	4,716
2	14 October	Australia def. Sheffield 52–22	Don Valley Stadium, Sheffield	5,500
3	18 October	Australia def. Cumbria 44–0	Derwent Park, Workington	5,156

The Australian squad for their WCF Tour was:
Mal Meninga (c), Allan Langer (vc), Tim Brasher, Willie Carne, John Cartwright, Bradley Clyde, Brad Fittler, David Gillespie, Brad Godden, Michael Hancock, Paul Harragon, Chris Johns, Glenn Lazarus, Bob Lindner, Graham Mackay, Steve Renouf, Mark Sargent, Paul Sironen, Kerrod Walters, Kevin Walters, Steve Walters.

Of the selected squad, only team vice captain Allan Langer, Paul Sironen and David Gillespie had played in Australia's 1988 World Cup final win over New Zealand. All three would go on to play in the Final at Wembley playing in the same positions and wearing the same numbers (7, 11 and 14 respectively) they had done four years earlier at Eden Park.

==== Results ====
Opposing Team	For	Against	Date	Venue	Attendance	Stage
New Zealand	22	14	23 July 1989	Mount Smart Stadium, Auckland	15,000	Group Stage
France	34	2	27 June 1990	Pioneer Oval, Parkes	12,384	Group Stage
Great Britain	14	0	24 November 1990	Elland Road, Leeds	32,500	Group Stage
France	34	10	9 December 1990	Stade Gilbert Brutus, Perpignan	3,428	Group Stage
New Zealand	40	12	31 July 1991	Lang Park, Brisbane	29,139	Group Stage
Papua New Guinea	40	6	13 October 1991	Lloyd Robson Oval, Port Moresby	14,500	Group Stage
Great Britain	16	10	3 July 1992	Lang Park, Brisbane	32,313	Group Stage
Papua New Guinea	36	14	15 July 1992	Townsville Sports Reserve, Townsville	12,470	Group Stage

=== Head to Head ===
Before the final, Australia and Great Britain had played each other 119 times, with Australia winning 57 times, Great Britain 57 and 5 draws. Australia had not lost a test series or a World Cup to Great Britain (or England) since the 1972 World Cup.

Australia and Great Britain had met in three previous World Cup finals; 1970 at Headingley Stadium in Leeds (won 12–7 by Australia), 1972 at Stade de Gerland in Lyon, France (the game finished in a 10–10 draw but the Lions were awarded the Cup after finishing on top of the table), and 1977 at the Sydney Cricket Ground (won 13–12 by Australia).

== Host venue ==
As they had done in 1988, Australia won the right to host the World Cup final. However, in the interests of rugby league and although they were confident of a sell-out if the game was held in Australia after capacity crowds attended all three Ashes Series tests earlier in the year against Great Britain, with the potential for a much larger attendance since at the time Lang Park in Brisbane could only hold 32,500, and the Sydney Football Stadium could only seat 42,500, the Australian Rugby League (ARL) agreed to the Rugby Football League (RFL) hosting the final at the 82,000 capacity Wembley Stadium in London.

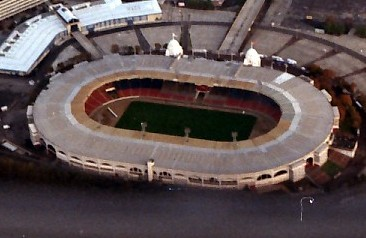
Wembley Stadium in London hosted its first Rugby League World Cup final

== Match details ==
For the Lions, veteran Wigan outside back Joe Lydon was called into the squad late after Graham Steadman had picked up an injury and was unavailable. With Daryl Powell also unavailable through injury, Garry Schofield (who retained the captaincy over Ellery Hanley) was moved to the centres while new Bradford Northern signing Deryck Fox was recalled to play halfback with Shaun Edwards moved to stand-off. Also recalled for his first test in almost two years (and ultimately his last) was 35 year old veteran front rower Kevin Ward. The Kangaroos went into the game with a question mark over their fullback with 21 year old Tim Brasher called upon to make his test debut in the No.1 jumper in the absence of Andrew Ettingshausen while injury to Laurie Daley saw Penrith's talented 20 year old Brad Fittler selected at 5/8. While the Lions were dominated by Wigan with 8 of their 17 being from the Cherry and Whites, it was Winfield Cup premiers Brisbane who had the most representation with 7 Broncos players selected (and all sporting crew-cuts as a result of their premiership celebrations), though Chris Johns would be the only player from either side not to get on the field during the game.

24 October 1992
2:30PM (BST)

Great Britain	6–10	Australia
Tries: Goals: Deryck Fox (3/4)		Tries: Steve Renouf; Goals: Mal Meninga (3/4)

Wembley Stadium, London
Attendance: 73,631
Referee: Dennis Hale (New Zealand)
Player of the Match: Steve Walters

Great Britain	Australia

FB	1	Joe Lydon
RW	2	Alan Hunte
RC	3	Gary Connolly
LC	4	Garry Schofield (c)
LW	5	Martin Offiah
SO	6	Shaun Edwards
SH	7	Deryck Fox
PR	8	Kevin Ward
HK	9	Martin Dermott
PR	10	Andy Platt
SR	11	Denis Betts
SR	12	Phil Clarke
LK	13	Ellery Hanley
Substitutions:
IC	14	John Devereux
IC	15	Kelvin Skerrett
IC	16	Alan Tait
IC	17	Richard Eyres
Coach:
(England) Mal Reilly

FB	1	Tim Brasher
RW	2	Willie Carne
RC	3	Steve Renouf
LC	4	Mal Meninga (c)
LW	5	Michael Hancock
FE	6	Brad Fittler
HB	7	Allan Langer
PR	8	Glenn Lazarus
HK	9	Steve Walters
PR	10	Mark Sargent
SR	11	Paul Sironen
SR	12	Bob Lindner
LF	13	Bradley Clyde
Substitutions:
IC	14	John Cartwright
IC	15	David Gillespie
IC	16	Chris Johns
IC	17	Kevin Walters
Coach:
(Australia) Bob Fulton

=== First half ===
The first half of the World Cup final was a tight affair. The Lions took the lead early thanks to a penalty goal from Deryck Fox after a spilled bomb in front of the posts by debuting Kangaroos fullback Tim Brasher. Fox put up an attacking bomb and Brasher was tackled by Lions fullback Joe Lydon as he attempted to catch the ball. From there Steve Renouf dived on the loose ball that was only 2 metres in front of the posts and was ruled to be offside. From then on Fox and Kangaroos captain Mal Meninga traded penalty goals until the half with Great Britain going into the break with a 6–4 lead.

Great Britain were lucky to have a full complement on the field from about the 20 minute mark of the final after hooker Martin Dermott had caught Australian five-eighth Brad Fittler with an elbow to the face. However Dermott was cautioned by referee Hale rather than sent off. While Meninga kicked a penalty goal, Fittler went to the sidelines where he was cleared of serious injury and returned to the game without being replaced. At half time, Kangaroos doctor Nathan Gibbs diagnosed a hairline fracture of his cheek bone, but cleared him to play on.

Great Britain wasn't without its own problems though. Early in the first half fullback Joe Lydon picked up an ankle injury and he would be eventually replaced by Alan Tait in the second half. The Lions would also lose centre Gary Connolly to a leg injury which would see him replaced by a former Welsh rugby union international, John Devereux.

=== Second half ===
At half time, former Welsh rugby union international turned Widnes outside back John Devereux replaced Gary Conolly with the St Helens centre succumbing to an ankle injury picked up just before halftime. For the Kangaroos, 2nd rower Paul Sironen had suffered a back injury late in the first half and was replaced by David Gillespie.

Into the second half the match was becoming a struggle with neither team seriously threatening the others line. The closest either team came to scoring was when Australian winger Willie Carne looked to have scored in the corner but the final pass from Meninga was ruled forward. The home side were still leading 6–4 with only 12 minutes remaining. The only try of the match was then set up by Australian replacement back Kevin Walters who, with a clever cut-out pass, put his Brisbane Broncos teammate Steve Renouf into a gap created by replacement Lions centre John Devereux moving up and taking no–one (Walters had replaced lock forward Bradley Clyde who left the field with a dislocated shoulder with Brad Fittler moved to lock forward). Renouf, in his debut test for Australia, then raced 20 metres to score in the corner before replacement fullback Alan Tait and Shaun Edwards, who had earlier in the half spent 10 minutes in the sin-bin for kneeing Renouf after making a tackle on the debutant Australian, could come across in cover. Meninga's sideline conversion of Renouf's try gave Australia what would be a match winning 10–6 lead. Following Meninga's conversion, the dark clouds that had moved in over Wembley opened up and the rain started pouring, not stopping until after the final siren (it would actually begin to hail immediately after the match finished). Despite the change in weather, Australia was able to hold Great Britain out and maintain their lead until the final siren.

Australian hooker Steve Walters was named the man-of-the-match for the 1992 World Cup final.

== Broadcast ==
The match was broadcast into the United Kingdom by the BBC with commentary from Ray French and Alex Murphy.

The match was telecast live late at night throughout Australia on the Nine Network, with commentary provided by Ray Warren and former Australian test players Peter Sterling and Paul Vautin, with sideline comments from Chris Bombolas. The game broke Australia's midnight-to-dawn television ratings record which was set a year earlier by the rugby union's 1991 Rugby World Cup final in which Australia had defeated England at Twickenham Stadium in London.
