= Mark Sargent =

Australia international rugby league footballer

Mark "Sarge" Sargent
Personal information
- Full name: Mark Sargent
- Born: 18 August 1964 (age 62)

Playing information
- Height: 185 cm (6 ft 1 in)
- Weight: 108 kg (17 st 0 lb)
- Position: Prop
Club
Years	Team	Pld	T	G	FG	P
1986–88	Canterbury Bulldogs	19	0	0	0	0
1989–95	Newcastle Knights	126	18	0	0	72
	Total	145	18	0	0	72
Representative
Years	Team	Pld	T	G	FG	P
1989–94	NSW Country	3	0	0	0	0
1990	New South Wales	1	0	0	0	0
1990–92	Australia	4	1	0	0	4

Mark Sargent (born 18 August 1964) is an Australian former professional rugby league footballer who played in the 1980s and 1990s. A New South Wales State of Origin and Australian international representative forward, he played in the NSWRL premiership for the Canterbury-Bankstown Bulldogs and Newcastle Knights, winning the Rothmans Medal in 1989 while playing for Newcastle.

== Playing career ==
A Newcastle junior, Mark Sargent signed with Canterbury-Bankstown and made his first grade debut for the Bulldogs on 13 April 1986 against the North Sydney Bears at the Belmore Sports Ground. Sargent would play 19 games for the Bulldogs until the end of the 1988 NSWRL season and was unlucky to miss a place in their premiership winning team that year.

In 1989, Sargent signed for the Newcastle Knights who had been admitted to the competition in 1988. That year he co-won the Rothman's Medal for 'best and fairest' player of the year along with Cronulla-Sutherland Sharks second rower Gavin Miller.

Sargent was selected to represent New South Wales, playing from the bench in Game III of the 1990 State of Origin series. At the end of the 1990 NSWRL season, he went on the 1990 Kangaroo tour, becoming the Knights' first international representative. Sargent played in 11 games on the Kangaroo Tour, scoring 3 tries. He made his test debut for Australia as a substitute in the third and deciding Ashes test against Great Britain at Elland Road in Leeds won by the Kangaroos 14–0, and went on to play from the bench in the two tests series win over France at the end of the tour. He had actually been selected as a substitute for the second Ashes test against Great Britain at Old Trafford in Manchester in what was to be his test debut, however coach Bob Fulton did not use any of the teams subs (Sargent, Des Hasler, Greg Alexander and David Gillespie) during the game won 14–10 by Australia thanks to a last minute try to captain Mal Meninga. The win by the Kangaroos in Manchester kept the Ashes series alive after the Lions had produced a shock 19–12 win in the first test at London's Wembley Stadium. His selection for the second test saw Sargent become the Knights first ever test representative.

An injury riddled 1991 season saw him miss selection for both NSW and Australia's successful home Trans-Tasman series against New Zealand. He bounced back in 1992, though he again missed selection for both NSW in the Origin series as well as The Ashes series defence against the touring Great Britain side. However, he regained his test spot when he was selected on the bench for a mid-season 1992 World Cup qualifier against Papua New Guinea in Townsville where he crossed for his only test try in a 36–14 win for the Aussies. His form continued for the Knights and along with his front row partner Paul Harragon who made his Test and Origin debut in 1992, helped Newcastle into their first ever finals series.

At the end of the 1992 season, Sargent, Harragon and fullback Brad Godden were the Knights players selected to Australia's victorious World Cup final squad for a 4-game mini-tour of England (the Australian's played three lead up games against English club sides). Sargent was the only one of the trio selected for the final played in front of the then international rugby league record attendance of 73,631 at Wembley Stadium. The match, won by Australia 10-6 thanks to a late Steve Renouf try, was Sargent's last game for Australia and the only one of his 5 tests that he would be in the starting team.

Sargent, a Prop forward, retired from playing at the end of the 1995 ARL season. He played 145 games (19 for Canterbury, 126 for Newcastle) and scored 18 tries in his career (all for the Knights). He represented New South Wales on one occasion in State of Origin, and also represented Country Origin on three occasions between 1989 and 1994. He was also captain of the Knights in 1995 along with fellow front rower Paul Harragon.

== Post-playing career ==
During the Super League war Sargent was the corporate services manager of the Hunter Mariners who played in the Super League competition.

Sargent was a member of the NRL Judiciary in 1999 and 2000, and was the team manager at the Knights when they won the 2001 NRL Grand Final 30–24 over Parramatta. Sargent resigned from the position in 2005 after publicly voicing his concerns over the future of the Newcastle club.

In 2015 he completed his PhD in public policy at the University of Newcastle.
