= John Thompson (rugby league) =

English rugby league footballer (born 1959)

Personal information
- Born: 3 March 1959 (age 66)

Playing information
- Position: Prop, hooker, second-row
Club
Years	Team	Pld	T	G	FG	P
1978–97	Wakefield Trinity	302	22	0	0	77
≤1982–≥82	York
	Total	302	22	0	0	77

John Thompson (born 3 March 1959) is a former professional rugby league footballer who played in the 1970s, 1980s and 1990s. He played at club level for Wakefield Trinity, and York, as a prop, hooker, or second-row.

== Playing career ==
Thompson made his début for Wakefield Trinity during December 1978, during his time at Wakefield Trinity he scored eleven 3-point tries, and eleven 4-point tries.

=== County Cup Final appearances ===
Thompson played at prop in Wakefield Trinity's 8–11 defeat by Castleford in the 1990 Yorkshire Cup Final during the 1990–91 season at Elland Road, Leeds on Sunday 23 September 1990.

=== Notable tour matches ===
Thompson played hooker, and was sent off in Wakefield Trinity's 18–36 defeat by Australia in the 1990 Kangaroo tour of Great Britain and France tour match during the 1990–91 season at Belle Vue, Wakefield on Wednesday 10 October 1990.

=== Testimonial match ===
John Thompson's Testimonial match at Wakefield Trinity took place in 1988.
