= 1990–91 Yorkshire Cup =

- Structure: Regional knockout championship
- Teams: 18
- Winners: Castleford
- Runners-up: Wakefield Trinity

The 1990–91 Yorkshire Cup was the eighty-third occasion on which the Yorkshire Cup competition had been held.

Castleford won the trophy by beating Wakefield Trinity by the score of 11–8

The match was played at Elland Road, Leeds, now in West Yorkshire. The attendance was 12,420 and receipts were £61,432

This was the seventh time in the incredible eleven-year period in which Castleford, previously only once winners in 1977, will make eight appearances in the Yorkshire Cup final, winning on four and ending as runner-up on four occasions. It was also the first of what would be two victories for Castleford in two successive finals. within that eleven-year period.

== Background ==
This season there were no junior/amateur clubs taking part, no new entrants and no "leavers" and so the total of entries remained the same at eighteen.

This in turn resulted in the necessity to continue with a preliminary round to reduce the number of clubs entering the first round to sixteen.

== Competition and results ==
=== Preliminary round ===
Involved 2 matches and 4 clubs

Game No	Fixture Date	Home team	Score	Away team	Venue	Att	Rec	Notes	Ref
P1	Sun 19 Aug 1990	Bradford Northern	20–12	Sheffield Eagles	Odsal	3477			
P2	Sun 19 Aug 1990	Nottingham City	6–100	Hull Kingston Rovers	Bentley Road Stadium/Tattersfield	1010		(Note: Match transferred from the home ground of Harvey Hadden Stadium to Doncaster's Bentley Road Stadium/Tattersfield in hope of bigger attendance etc.) (Note: At the time this was the Hull Kingston Rovers record score) (Note: The highest score and winning margin and first time over 100 points scored - in a Yorkshire Cup tie)	

=== Round 1 ===
Involved 8 matches (with no byes) and 16 clubs

Game No	Fixture Date	Home team	Score	Away team	Venue	Att	Rec	Notes	Ref
1	Sun 26 Aug 1990	Batley	17–10	Huddersfield	Mount Pleasant	1734			
2	Sun 26 Aug 1990	Dewsbury	26–14	Keighley	Crown Flatt	1056			
3	Sun 26 Aug 1990	Doncaster	4–40	Halifax	Bentley Road Stadium/Tattersfield	2989			
4	Sun 26 Aug 1990	Featherstone Rovers	36–4	Bramley	Post Office Road	2445			
5	Sun 26 Aug 1990	Hull F.C.	6–10	Castleford	Boulevard	6591			
6	Sun 26 Aug 1990	Leeds	16–24	Bradford Northern	Headingley	13968			
7	Sun 26 Aug 1990	Ryedale-York	0–10	Hull Kingston Rovers	Ryedale Stadium	2264		(Note: The first Yorkshire Cup match to be played at Ryedale-York's new stadium)	
8	Sun 26 Aug 1990	Wakefield Trinity	28–18	Hunslet	Belle Vue	3150			

=== Round 2 - Quarter-finals ===
Involved 4 matches and 8 clubs

Game No	Fixture Date	Home team	Score	Away team	Venue	Att	Rec	Notes	Ref
1	Sun 2 Sep 1990	Bradford Northern	12–42	Castleford	Valley Parade	7974		(Note: Match played at Valley Parade, home of Bradford City A.F.C.)	
2	Sun 2 Sep 1990	Dewsbury	18–8	Batley	Crown Flatt	2924			
3	Sun 2 Sep 1990	Featherstone Rovers	22–31	Hull Kingston Rovers	Post Office Road	4357			
4	Sun 2 Sep 1990	Wakefield Trinity	26–17	Halifax	Belle Vue	6492			

=== Round 3 – Semi-finals ===
Involved 2 matches and 4 clubs

Game No	Fixture Date	Home team	Score	Away team	Venue	Att	Rec	Notes	Ref
1	Wed 12 Sep 1990	Castleford	29–6	Hull Kingston Rovers	Wheldon Road	7940			
2	Wed 12 Sep 1990	Wakefield Trinity	25–2	Dewsbury	Belle Vue	5640			

=== Final ===
Game No	Fixture Date	Home team	Score	Away team	Venue	Att	Rec	Notes	Ref
	Sunday 23 September 1990	Castleford	11–8	Wakefield Trinity	Elland Road	12,420	£61,432	(Note: Elland Road, Leeds, is the home ground of Leeds United A.F.C. with a capacity of 37,914 (The record attendance was 57,892 set on 15 March 1967 for a cup match Leeds v Sunderland). The ground was originally established in 1897 by Holbeck RLFC who played there until their demise after the conclusion of the 1903-04 season)	

==== Teams and scorers ====
Castleford	№	Wakefield Trinity
	Teams	
Steve Larder	1	Kevin Harcombe
St. John Ellis	2	David Jones
Shaun Irwin	3	Andy Mason
Grant Anderson	4	Phil Eden
David Plange	5	Andy Wilson
Graham Steadman	6	Tracy Lazenby
Gary Atkins	7	Mark Conway
Lee Crooks (c)	8	Adrian Shelford
Roy Southernwood	9	Billy Conway
Dean Sampson	10	John Thompson
Neil Battye	11	Andy Kelly (c)
Jeff Hardy	12	Gary Price
Neil Roebuck	13	Nigel Bell
	Subs	
Keith England (for Atkins 49 m)	14	Chris Perry (for Kelly 55 m)
Martin Ketteridge (for Battye 77 m)	15	Richard Slater (for B. Conway 38 m)
Darryl Van de Velde	Coach	David Topliss
11	score	8
4	HT	8
	Scorers	
	Tries	
Gary Atkins (1)	T	Andy Mason (1)
David Plange (1)	T	
	Goals	
Lee Crooks (1)	G	Kevin Harcombe (2)
	Drop Goals	
Neil Roebuck (1)	DG	
Referee		James "Jim" Smith (Halifax)
White Rose Trophy for Man of the match		Tracy Lazenby - Wakefield Trinity - stand-off
sponsored by		
Competition Sponsor		John Smith's Brewery Tadcaster

Scoring - Try = four points - Goal = two points - Drop goal = one point

=== The road to success ===
The following chart excludes any preliminary round fixtures/results

First round
Leeds	16
Bradford Northern	24
Hull F.C.	6
Castleford	10
Featherstone Rovers	36
Bramley	4
Ryedale-York	0
Hull Kingston Rovers	10
Wakefield Trinity	28
Hunslet	18
Doncaster	4
Halifax	40
Dewsbury	26
Keighley	14
Batley	17
Huddersfield	10

Second round
Bradford Northern	12
Castleford	42
Featherstone Rovers	22
Hull Kingston Rovers	31
Wakefield Trinity	26
Halifax	17
Dewsbury	18
Batley	8

Semi-finals
Castleford	29
Hull Kingston Rovers	6
Wakefield Trinity	25
Dewsbury	2

Final
Castleford	11
Wakefield Trinity	8

== Brief report on the final ==
According to the League Express match reporter Mike Beevers (abridged as follows) :-

In front of almost 12,500 fans paying over £60,000, Castleford finally got rid of their Elland Road bogey, having lost all three previous Yorkshire Cup finals played at this ground, by beating local rivals Wakefield Trinity 11-8 in this year's Yorkshire Cup final.

Wakefield stand-off Tracey Lazenby made the break that produced the first try of the match for Andy Mason, which Kevin Harcombe converted from touch.

Castleford hit back through Gary Atkins, but Lee Crooks failed to convert.

Before half time Wakefield went further ahead through a penalty from Kevin Harcombe.

Lee Crooks cut the deficit with a penalty of his own on 49 minutes.

The introduction of international prop Keith ‘Beefy’ England changed the game and, shortly afterwards, winger David Plange, playing his first game of the season, followed up a great trysaving tackle on Andy Mason by scoring the game’s crucial try, which came from a long ball from hooker Graham Southernwood. Skipper Lee Crooks converted to pick up his fifth winners’ medal in the competition, after having won three times with Hull and once with Leeds.

Wakefield stand-off Tracey Lazenby won the White Rose Trophy as man of the match

== See also ==
- 1990–91 Rugby Football League season
- Rugby league county cups
