= 1990–91 Challenge Cup =

Rugby league competition

1991 Silk Cut Challenge Cup
- Duration: 6 Rounds
- Winners: Wigan
- Runners-up: St. Helens
- Lance Todd Trophy: Denis Betts

The 1991 Challenge Cup was the 90th staging of rugby league's oldest knockout competition, the Challenge Cup. Known as the Silk Cut Challenge Cup for sponsorship reasons, the final was contested by Wigan and St. Helens at Wembley. Wigan won the match 13–8.

== Preliminary round ==
Date	Team One	Team Two	Score
27 Jan	Carlisle	Workington Town	8-9
27 Jan	Hensingham	Dewsbury	7-24
27 Jan	Leigh East	Bradford Northern	12-24
27 Jan	Salford	Cutsyke	44-4
27 Jan	Warrington	Huddersfield	22-4
30 Jan	Sheffield Eagles	Hull FC	19-6

== First round ==
Date	Team One	Team Two	Score
10 Feb	Doncaster	Widnes	4-30
10 Feb	Leeds	Dewsbury	40-20
10 Feb	Swinton	St Helens	8-18
12 Feb	Castleford	Wigan	4-28
14 Feb	Keighley	Runcorn	36-4
15 Feb	Salford	Batley	36-14
17 Feb	Barrow	Hunslet	13-8
17 Feb	Bradford Northern	Leigh	50-4
17 Feb	Bramley	Oldham	6-38
17 Feb	Halifax	Fulham	46-6
17 Feb	Nottingham	Whitehaven	10-26
17 Feb	Ryedale-York	Warrington	1-8
17 Feb	Sheffield Eagles	Featherstone Rovers	19-12
17 Feb	Wakefield Trinity	Trafford	18-7
17 Feb	Workington Town	Hull Kingston Rovers	18-12
19 Feb	Rochdale Hornets	Chorley	14-10

== Second round ==
Date	Team One	Team Two	Score
23 Feb	Rochdale	Wigan	4-72
24 Feb	Barrow	Widnes	4-28
24 Feb	Halifax	Whitehaven	46-12
24 Feb	Keighley	Warrington	10-42
24 Feb	Sheffield	Salford	16-19
24 Feb	Workington Town	Oldham	15-20
24 Feb	St Helens	Wakefield Trinity	16-2
24 Feb	Bradford Northern	Leeds	5-0

== Quarter-finals ==
Date	Team One	Team Two	Score
09 Mar	Warrington	Widnes	14-26
10 Mar	Wigan	Bradford Northern	32-2
10 Mar	Halifax	St Helens	16-24
10 Mar	Oldham	Salford	40-3

== Semi finals ==
23 March 1991

Wigan	30 – 16	Oldham
Try: Botica, Edwards, Goodway, Hanley, Iro; Goal: Botica (5)	Report	Try: Ford, Henderson, McAlister; Goal: Atkinson (2)

Burnden Park, Bolton
Attendance: 19,057

30 March 1991

St. Helens	19 – 2	Widnes
Try: Griffiths (2), Hunte; Goal: Loughlin (3); Drop goal: Groves	Report	Goal: Davies

Central Park, Wigan
Attendance: 16,109

== Final ==
27 April 1991

Wigan	13 – 8	St. Helens
Try: Myers, Botica; Goal: Botica (2); Drop goal: Gregory	Report	Try: Hunte; Goal: Bishop (2)

Wembley, London
Attendance: 75,532
Player of the Match: Denis Betts

FB	1	Steve Hampson
RW	2	David Myers
RC	3	Kevin Iro
LC	4	Dean Bell
LW	5	Frano Botica
SO	6	Shaun Edwards
SH	7	Andy Gregory
PR	8	Ian Lucas
HK	9	Martin Dermott
PR	10	Andy Platt
SR	11	Denis Betts
SR	12	Phil Clarke
LF	13	Ellery Hanley (c)
Substitutions:
IC	14	Bobbie Goulding
IC	15	Andy Goodway
Coach:
John Monie

FB	1	Phil Veivers
RW	2	Alan Hunte
RC	3	Tea Ropati
LC	4	Paul Loughlin
LW	5	Les Quirk
SO	6	Jonathan Griffiths
SH	7	Paul Bishop
PR	8	Jon Neill
HK	9	Bernard Dwyer
PR	10	Kevin Ward
SR	11	John Harrison
SR	12	George Mann
LF	13	Shane Cooper (c)
Substitutions:
IC	14	Gary Connolly
IC	15	Paul Groves
Coach:
Mike McClennan
