= Lilian Hébert =

France international rugby league footballer (born 1971)

Personal information
- Born: 28 May 1971 (age 54) France

Playing information
- Position: Prop
Club
Years	Team	Pld	T	G	FG	P
	Limoux
	Saint-Estève
	Pia
	AS Carcassonne
	Total	0	0	0	0	0
Representative
Years	Team	Pld	T	G	FG	P
1992–95	France	6	0	0	0	0

Lilian Hébert is a French rugby league footballer who represented France at the 1995 World Cup. He made his first steps in rugby league in Vernajoul, which also produced names such as Jacques Moliner, Claude Sirvent and Christophe Moly.

Hébert played for AS Carcassonne.

After his retirement as player, he is in the restauration business, opening restaurants named "Le Lounge, "Tivoli" and later "Concept" in Limoux.
