= Thierry Valéro =

France international rugby league footballer

Personal information
- Born: 10 June 1966 (age 59) France

Playing information
- Position: Hooker, Loose forward
Club
Years	Team	Pld	T	G	FG	P
19??-88	Lézignan
1988-??	Pamiers
19??-??	Lézignan
	Total	0	0	0	0	0
Representative
Years	Team	Pld	T	G	FG	P
1988	Rest of the World	1	0	0	0	0
1989–95	France	24	0	0	0	0

Thierry Valéro is a French rugby league footballer who represented France national rugby league team at the 1995 World Cup.

== Playing career ==
Valéro played for the Rest of the World in 1988 against Great Britain.

He made his debut for France in 1989 and played against the Australia touring team during the 1990 Kangaroo tour of Great Britain and France. He went on to play in twenty four test matches for France, with his last match being at the 1995 World Cup.

In the 1998–99 season, Valéro captained FC Lézignan in their loss to US Villeneuve in the final of the Lord Derby Cup.
