= Nigel Bell =

English rugby league footballer

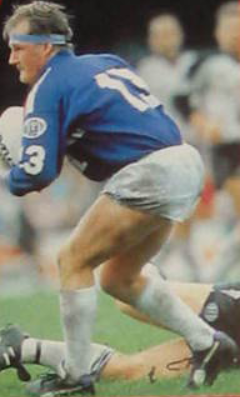

Personal information
- Full name: Nigel M. Bell
- Born: 2 December 1962 (age 62); Wakefield, England

Playing information
- Position: Backs, Forwards
Club
Years	Team	Pld	T	G	FG	P
1983–96	Wakefield Trinity	358	60	0	0	240

Nigel M. Bell (born 2 December 1962) is an English former professional rugby league footballer who played in the 1980s and 1990s. He played at club level for Wakefield Trinity (captain), as a utility player.

== Background ==
Nigel Bell's birth was registered in Wakefield, West Riding of Yorkshire, England.

== Playing career ==
=== County Cup Final appearances ===
Nigel Bell played loose forward in Wakefield Trinity's 8–11 defeat by Castleford in the 1990 Yorkshire Cup Final during the 1990–91 season at Elland Road, Leeds on Sunday 23 September 1990.

=== Club career ===
Nigel Bell made his début for Wakefield Trinity against at Leigh at Hilton Park, Leigh on Sunday 1 January 1984, he played his last match for Wakefield Trinity during 1996, he is ninth on the all-time Wakefield Trinity appearance list with 358 matches.

== Genealogical information ==
Nigel Bell is the older brother of the rugby league footballer for Westgate Redoubt ARLFC and Bramley, Kevin Bell.
