= Vince Fawcett =

English rugby league footballer (1970–2026)

Personal information
- Born: 13 November 1970 Leeds, England
- Died: 6 February 2026 (aged 55)

Playing information
- Position: Wing, Centre, Stand-off, Loose forward
Club
Years	Team	Pld	T	G	FG	P
1987–1993	Leeds	69	22	0	0	88
1994–1996	Workington Town	50	24	0	0	96
1995–1996	Parramatta Eels	14	3	0	0	12
1997	Oldham Bears	9	3	0	0	12
1998	Warrington Wolves	14	1	0	0	4
1999	Wakefield Trinity Wildcats	14	2	0	0	8
	Total	170	55	0	0	220
Representative
Years	Team	Pld	T	G	FG	P
1990–1991	Great Britain U-21	3	3	0	0	12

Vince Fawcett (13 November 1970 – 6 February 2026) was an English professional rugby league footballer who played in the 1980s and 1990s. He played at club level for Leeds, Workington Town, the Parramatta Eels, Oldham Bears, the Warrington Wolves and the Wakefield Trinity Wildcats, as a wing, stand-off, or loose forward.

== Background ==
Vince Fawcett was born in Leeds, West Riding of Yorkshire, England on 13 November 1970.

== Playing career ==
Fawcett struggled to fulfil his potential in a star-studded but underachieving Leeds side but thrived in a big-fish-in-a-small-pond role at Workington Town in the 1994–95 season when Workington Town, back in the game's top division, secured a mid-table finish. Fawcett enjoyed an excellent season and scored three tries against his old side.

His form alerted Parramatta Eels where he enjoyed a successful short stint in 1995 where he is best remembered for a match-winning performance against archrivals Canterbury-Bankstown, as his two tries helped Parramatta register a shock win.

The big centre returned to England with Oldham Bears in 1997, scoring only three tries, but they all came in the same game against Challenge Cup holders, St. Helens. Fawcett went on to play Super League for Warrington Wolves and Wakefield Trinity Wildcats.

== Death ==
Fawcett died on 9 February 2026, at the age of 55.

== International honours ==
Fawcett appeared for Great Britain at under-21 level. He was named in England's 40-man training squad in preparation for the 1995 Rugby League World Cup, but was not included in the final squad.
