= Richard Clarke (rugby league) =

France international rugby league footballer

Personal information
- Full name: Richard Clarke
- Born: 3 February 1962 (age 64) Sydney, New South Wales, Australia

Playing information
- Position: Prop
Club
Years	Team	Pld	T	G	FG	P
1985	St. George Dragons	1	0	0	0	0
1989	Newcastle Knights	1	1	0	0	4
	Total	2	1	0	0	4
Representative
Years	Team	Pld	T	G	FG	P
1993	France	1	0	0	0	0

Richard Clarke (born 3 February 1962) is an Australian former rugby league footballer who played in the 1980s and 1990s.

He played for the St. George Dragons in 1985, and the Newcastle Knights in 1989. He played for France in 1993.
