= Francis Laforgue =

France international rugby league player

Personal information
- Born: 13 April 1958 (age 68) Prades, Pyrénées-Orientales, Occitania, France

Playing information
- Height: 1.87 m (6 ft 2 in)
- Weight: 87 kg (13 st 10 lb)

Rugby league
- Position: Centre, Five-eighth
Club
Years	Team	Pld	T	G	FG	P
1978–89	XIII Catalan
Representative
Years	Team	Pld	T	G	FG	P
1983–86	France	5

Rugby union
Club
Years	Team	Pld	T	G	FG	P
19??–??	JOP XV Prades
- Source: https://www.rugbyleagueproject.org/players/francis-laforgue/summary.html
- Relatives: Guy Laforgue (brother)

Francis Laforgue (born on 13 April 1958 in Prades) is a French former rugby league player, 1,87 m tall and 87 kg heavy. His twin brother is Guy Laforgue. Like him, he made his first steps at the rugby school of XIII Catalan.

Centre or five-eights, he rapidly acceded to the first-grade team while he was a junior player. A player with an imposing build for a centre, he is also a fast, technic and excellent defender. He practically made his entire career at XIII Catalan between 1978 and 1989 and ended his rugby career in his hometown, Prades (JOP XV). Outside the field, he works as financial counselor.

== Clubs ==
- XIII Catalan
- JOP XV Prades

== Honours ==
- Junior French Champion in 1976.
- 5 times French Champion for XIII Catalan : between 1982 and 85, later in 1987.
- Finalist in the French Championship in 1977 and 1986 for XIII Catalan.
- Lord Derby Cup : 3 victories for XIII Catalan in 1977, 1980 and 1985 and a final in 1987.

== International ==
- 4 caps for France junior team and 3 caps 3 under-21 caps
- 6 caps for France : in 1980 (vs Great Britain), later, between 1983 and 1986 (vs Great Britain : 2 caps, vs Australia : 2 caps, vs New Zealand : 1 cap).
- A match for the 50 years of XIII Catalan against Salford in 1981 (8-4 victory)
