= Guy Laforgue =

Former France international rugby league footballer

Personal information
- Born: 13 April 1958 (age 67) Prades, France

Playing information
- Position: Second-row
Club
Years	Team	Pld	T	G	FG	P
1982–89	XIII Catalan
1990–92	Le Barcarès XIII
1993–95	Palau XIII
	Total	0	0	0	0	0
Representative
Years	Team	Pld	T	G	FG	P
1981–87	France	19	0	0	0	0
- Relatives: Francis Laforgue (brother)

Guy Laforgue (born 13 April 1958) is a French rugby league player who represented France, including in Rugby League World Cup matches. Laforgue captained France when they played two test matches against the Australia touring team during the 1986 Kangaroo tour of Great Britain and France. He is the twin brother of fellow rugby league player Francis Laforgue.
