= Mike Dixon (rugby league) =

Scotland international rugby league footballer

Personal information
- Full name: Michael Dixon
- Born: 6 April 1971 (age 55) Kingston upon Hull, East Riding of Yorkshire, England

Playing information
- Position: Hooker
Club
Years	Team	Pld	T	G	FG	P
1989–97	Hull FC	135	13	0	0	52
1998–02	Hull Kingston Rovers	146	39	0	0	156
	Total	281	52	0	0	208
Representative
Years	Team	Pld	T	G	FG	P
1997–01	Scotland	3	0	0	0	0

Michael "Mike" Dixon (born 6 April 1971) is a former professional rugby league footballer who played in the 1980s, 1990s and 2000s. He played at representative level for Scotland, and at club level for Hull FC and Hull Kingston Rovers as a hooker.

== Playing career ==
=== International honours ===
Dixon won three caps for Scotland between 1997 and 2001.
