= Andy Wilson (rugby league) =

English rugby league footballer

Personal information
- Full name: Andrew Wilson
- Born: 5 October 1963 (age 62) Leeds, England

Playing information
- Position: Wing
Club
Years	Team	Pld	T	G	FG	P
1982–83	Huddersfield	26	5	45	1	109
1984–85	Mansfield Marksman	15	4	0	0	16
1986–87	Sheffield Eagles	17	5	0	0	20
1988–96	Wakefield Trinity	195	74	0	0	296
	Total	253	88	45	1	441

Andrew Wilson (born 5 October 1963) is an English former professional rugby league footballer who played in the 1980s and 1990s. He played at club level for Huddersfield and Wakefield Trinity, as a wing. He is Assistant Coach at Yorkshire Amateur Rugby League side Queens ARLFC of Leeds, who play in the Unison Premier Division.

== Background ==
Wilson was born in Leeds, West Riding of Yorkshire, England.

== Playing career ==
=== County Cup Final appearances ===
Wilson played on the wing in Wakefield Trinity's 8–11 defeat by Castleford in the 1990–91 Yorkshire Cup Final during the 1990–91 season at Elland Road, Leeds on Sunday 23 September 1990, and played on the wing in the 29–16 victory over Sheffield Eagles in the 1992–93 Yorkshire Cup Final during the 1992–93 season at Elland Road, Leeds on Sunday 18 October 1992.
