= David Gomia =

PNG international rugby league footballer

Personal information
- Born: Papua New Guinea

Playing information
- Position: Wing, Centre
Representative
| Years | Team | Pld | T | G | FG | P |
|---|---|---|---|---|---|---|
| 1991 | Highlands Zone |
| 1994–98 | Papua New Guinea | 8 | 2 | 0 | 0 | 8 |

David Gomia is a Papua New Guinean former professional rugby league footballer who represented Papua New Guinea at the 1995 World Cup.

== Playing career ==
Gomia represented the Highlands Zone in 1991. He first represented Papua New Guinea in 1994 and went on to play for Papua New Guinea for four years, including matches against the New Zealand Māori side in 1998. He played in two matches at the 1995 World Cup.

Gomia originally played for Goroka in the SP Cup but spent time with the Mt Hagen Eagles before joining the Enga Mioks in 2001.
