= Cyril Baudouin =

France international rugby league footballer

Personal information
- Born: France

Playing information
- Position: Second-row
Club
Years	Team	Pld	T	G	FG	P
	Carpentras XIII
Representative
Years	Team	Pld	T	G	FG	P
1994–95	France	3	0	0	0	0

Cyril Baudouin is a French rugby league footballer who represented France at the 1995 World Cup.

== Playing career ==
Playing for the Carpentras XIII club, Baudouin represented France Under-21s in 1993.

The next year he made his test debut for France, playing against Fiji. He was part of the French side at the 1995 World Cup, playing in two matches.
