= Peter Martin (rugby league) =

Australian rugby league footballer

Personal information
- Full name: Peter Martin

Playing information
- Position: Second-row, Hooker
Club
Years	Team	Pld	T	G	FG	P
1985–88	North Sydney	22	2	0	0	8
1985–86	York	20	3	0	0	12
1989	Parramatta Eels	6	0	0	0	0
	Total	48	5	0	0	20
- Source: As of 17 February 2023

Peter Martin is an Australian former professional rugby league footballer who played in the 1980s. He played for North Sydney and Parramatta in the NSWRL competition. He also played for York in England.

== Playing career ==
Martin made his first-grade debut for North Sydney in round 2 of the 1985 NSWRL season against Illawarra at the Wollongong Showground. During the NSWRL off-season, Martin signed for English side York and played in their 1985-1986 season which ended with the club finishing in 14th place and being relegated to the second division. In 1986, Martin played six games for Norths as they qualified for the playoff game for fifth place against Balmain which they lost 14–7 at the Sydney Cricket Ground. Martin played at second-row in this game. After two further seasons at Norths, Martin signed for Parramatta in 1989 and played six games.
