= Neil Turner (rugby league) =

English rugby league footballer

Personal information
- Born: 30 October 1963 (age 61)

Playing information
- Position: Wing
Club
Years	Team	Pld	T	G	FG	P
1985–89	Doncaster	146	72	0	0	288
1989–93	Hull FC	63	28	0	0	112
1992–93	Doncaster	2	1	0	0	4
	Total	211	101	0	0	404

Neil Turner is an English former professional rugby league footballer who played in the 1980s and 1990s. He played at club level for Doncaster and Hull FC, as a wing.

Turner won the Rugby League Premiership final with Hull F.C. in 1991 after joining from Doncaster. He is a former detective with the South Yorkshire Police.

== Premiership Final appearances ==
Neil Turner played wing, in Hull FC's 14-4 victory over Widnes in the Premiership Final during the 1990–91 season at Old Trafford, Manchester on Sunday 12 May 1991.
