= Jon Neill =

Scotland international rugby league footballer

Personal information
- Full name: Jonathan Charles Neill
- Born: 19 December 1968 (age 56); Whitehaven, Cumbria, England

Playing information
- Position: Prop
Club
Years	Team	Pld	T	G	FG	P
1987–96	St Helens	105	3	0	1	13
1996–99	Huddersfield Giants	64	0	0	0	0
2000–02	Swinton Lions	36	0	0	0	0
	Total	205	3	0	1	13
Representative
Years	Team	Pld	T	G	FG	P
1994	Cumbria	1	0	0	0	0
1997–99	Scotland	2	0	0	0	0

Jonathan Charles Neill (born 19 December 1968) is a former professional rugby league footballer who played in the 1980s, 1990s and 2000s. He played at representative level for Scotland and Cumbria, and at club level for St. Helens, Huddersfield Giants and Swinton Lions, as a prop.

== Background ==
Jon Neill's birth was registered in Whitehaven, Cumberland, England.

== Playing career ==
=== St Helens ===
Neill was signed by St Helens from junior club Kells in 1987. He established a regular first team place during the 1990–91 season and played in the 1990–91 Challenge Cup final, losing 8–13 against Wigan.

Neill played prop in St Helens' 24–14 victory over Rochdale Hornets in the 1991–92 Lancashire Cup final during the 1991–92 season on Sunday 20 October 1991. He also played in the 1991–92 Premiership final at the end of the season, but lost 16–48 against Wigan.

In the following season, Neill played in the 1992–93 Premiership final, but was on the winning side this time with a 10–4 victory against Wigan.

Neill did not play for Saints during the 1995–96 season due to a contract dispute, as he was reluctant to become a full-time professional. He returned to the first team during the inaugural Super League season, playing in a 60–16 win against Workington Town on 16 June 1996.

=== Later career ===
In 1996, Neill joined Huddersfield Giants on a free transfer.

Neill finished his playing career with Swinton Lions. In 2001, he suffered a cruciate ligament injury and was ruled out for the rest of the season. He announced his retirement in 2002.

=== Representative honours ===
Neill won two caps for Scotland in 1997–1999 while at Huddersfield Giants. He also represented Cumbria in 1994 in a match against Australia.
