= Jonathan Griffiths =

GB & Wales dual-code international rugby footballer

Personal information
- Full name: Jonathan Lynn Griffiths
- Born: 23 August 1964 (age 60); Carmarthen, Wales

Playing information

Rugby union
- Position: Scrum half
Club
Years	Team	Pld	T	G	FG	P
1983–1997	Llanelli RFC	178	69	3	0	288
Representative
Years	Team	Pld	T	G	FG	P
1988–89	Wales	2	0	0	0	0

Rugby league
- Position: Stand-off, Scrum-half
Club
Years	Team	Pld	T	G	FG	P
1989–95	St Helens	140	39	0	0	156
Representative
Years	Team	Pld	T	G	FG	P
1991–94	Wales	6	2	0	1	9
1992	Great Britain	1	1	0	0	4

Jonathan Lynn Griffiths (born 23 August 1964) is a Welsh former rugby union, and professional rugby league footballer who played as a stand-off or scrum-half in the 1980s and 1990s.

== Rugby union ==
Griffiths played club level rugby union for Llanelli. He attained his first cap for the Wales national rugby union team 11 June 1988 versus New Zealand. In 1989, he switched codes to rugby league, joining St Helens.

== Rugby league ==
Griffiths played at stand-off for St Helens' in their 8–13 defeat against Wigan in the 1990–91 Challenge Cup final at Wembley Stadium. He also played scrum-half in St Helens' 4–5 defeat by Wigan in the 1992 Lancashire Cup Final during the 1992–93 season at Knowsley Road, St Helens on Sunday 18 October 1992.

Griffiths was a Great Britain and Wales international. He was named in the Wales squad for the 1995 Rugby League World Cup, but did not make any appearances during the tournament.

== Personal life ==
As of 2013, Griffith's is a fireman in Pembrokeshire and a practising Christian. He has two children called Stevie and Jack. Stevie was recently promoted to the role of AR. Wayulllllls.
