= Tracy Lazenby =

English rugby league footballer

Personal information
- Full name: Tracy Lazenby
- Born: second ¼ 1959 (age 65–66); Kingston upon Hull, England

Playing information
- Position: Stand-off, Loose forward
Club
Years	Team	Pld	T	G	FG	P
1983–85	Hull Kingston Rovers	12+1	4	0	0	12
1985–86	Wakefield Trinity	139	21	38	14	170
1986–87	Hull FC	15	2	0	0	8
1989	Penrith Panthers	4	0	0	0	0
1989–92	Wakefield Trinity	4	0	0	0	0
1992–93	Hull Kingston Rovers	2	1	0	0	4
	Total	177	28	38	14	194
- Relatives: Colin Lazenby (brother)

Tracy Lazenby (second ¼ 1959), also known by the nickname of "OHMSS", is an English former professional rugby league footballer who played in the 1980s and 1990s. He played at club level for Hull Kingston Rovers (two spells), Wakefield Trinity (two spells) (captain), Hull FC and Penrith Panthers, as a stand-off, or loose forward.

== Background ==
Lazenby was born in Kingston upon Hull, East Riding of Yorkshire, England.

== Playing career ==
=== County Cup Final appearances ===
Tracy Lazenby played stand-off, and was man of the match winning the White Rose Trophy in Wakefield Trinity's 8-11 defeat by Castleford in the 1990 Yorkshire Cup Final during the 1990–91 season at Elland Road, Leeds on Sunday 23 September 1990.

=== Club career ===
Tracy Lazenby made his début for Wakefield Trinity on Tuesday 5 November 1985.

== Genealogical information ==
Tracy Lazenby is the brother of the rugby league footballer who played in the 1980s for Hull F.C.; Colin Lazenby.

== Note ==
Tracy Lazenby's forename is occasionally spelt with an additional e, i.e. Tracey.
