= Theo Anast =

Australian rugby league player

Personal information
- Full name: Theo Anast
- Born: 1966 (age 59–60) Armidale, Australia
- Weight: 130 kg (20 st 7 lb; 290 lb)

Playing information
- Position: Prop
Club
| Years | Team | Pld | T | G | FG | P |
|---|---|---|---|---|---|---|
| 1987–88 | Hunslet | 4 | 0 | 0 | 0 | 0 |
| 1988–89 | Canterbury Bankstown | 2 | 0 | 0 | 0 | 0 |
| 1990–94 | St Gaudens | 51 | 7 |
| | Total | 57 | 7 | 0 | 0 | 0 |
Representative
| Years | Team | Pld | T | G | FG | P |
| 1993–94 | France | 6 | 0 | 0 | 0 | 0 |

Theo Anast (born 1966) is a France former international rugby league footballer who played for the Canterbury Bulldogs in the Australian New South Wales Rugby League premiership and St Gaudens in the French Elite Championship. Anast represented the French national side on several occasions. His position of choice was as a prop-forward.

== Background ==
Anast born in Armidale, New South Wales, Australia.

He is of Greek heritage through parentage.

== Early career ==
He grew up playing rugby league at an early age and his natural talent for the game was immediately recognisable when he was selected to play for the Australian Schoolboys side during the 1984 season.

While attending Armidale High School, Anast played for the Australian Schoolboys team in 1984.

== Career ==
He was however unable to fulfill his ability while playing in Australia where after he was signed to the Canterbury Bulldogs club in the New South Wales Rugby League premiership he played on one occasion during the 1988–89 season and eventually decided to move to France to play with the St Gaudens club.

In his first season in the French Elite Championship he had some impressive showings first earning himself a call up to the President's XIII during the 1990 season for a friendly match against the touring Australians and in 1993 eventually made his debut for the French national side while on tour in Great Britain. Around this time he was strongly linked with a move to English side Workington Town.

== Career playing statistics ==
=== Point scoring summary ===
| Games | Tries | Goals | F/G | Points |
|---|---|---|---|---|
| – | – | – | – | – |

=== Matches played ===
| Team | Matches | Years |
|---|---|---|
| Canterbury Bulldogs | 2 | 1988–1989 |
| RC Saint-Gaudens | ? | 1990–1994 |
| France | 6 | 1993–1994 |
