= David Myers (rugby league) =

GB international rugby league footballer (1971–2008)

Personal information
- Born: 31 July 1971 Widnes, Cheshire, England
- Died: 20 October 2008 (aged 37) Cheshire, England

Playing information
- Height: 5 ft 11 in (1.80 m)
- Weight: 15 st 10 lb (100 kg)
- Position: Wing
Club
Years	Team	Pld	T	G	FG	P
1989	Widnes	8	3	0	0	12
1989–90	Warrington	6	0	0	0	0
1990–92	Wigan	69	38	0	0	152
1991	Manly Sea Eagles	4	1	0	0	4
1992–94	Widnes	61	21	0	0	84
1994–95	Bradford Northern	28	12	0	0	48
1995	Western Suburbs	1	0	0	0	0
1995–96	Salford Reds	7	0	0	0	0
1997	Widnes Vikings	16	2	0	0	8
	Total	200	77	0	0	308
Representative
Years	Team	Pld	T	G	FG	P
1991–92	Great Britain U21	5	10	0	0	40
1991	Lancashire	1	1	0	0	4

David Myers (31 July 1971 – 20 October 2008) was an English professional rugby league footballer who played in the 1980s and 1990s. He played as a reserve at representative level for Great Britain in non-Test matches on the 1992 tour of Papua New Guinea, Australia, and New Zealand, and at club level for Widnes (two spells), Warrington, Wigan, Manly-Warringah Sea Eagles, Bradford Bulls, Western Suburbs Magpies and Salford City Reds, as a wing.

== Background ==
David Myers was born in Widnes, Cheshire, England on 31 July 1971. He played junior rugby league for Blackbrook before turning professional, joining Widnes in August 1988.

== Playing career ==
=== Early career ===
Myers made his senior debut for Widnes in February 1989, scoring a hat trick against Oldham. He made eight appearances for the club during the 1988–89 season.

In August 1989, Myers was the subject of a contract dispute between Widnes and Warrington, with both clubs claiming they had signed the player. The Rugby Football League ruled in favour of Warrington, with an independent tribunal setting the transfer fee at an initial £35,000, potentially rising to £80,000 depending on future appearances. Myers made six appearances for Warrington during the 1989–90 season, but was transfer listed in February 1990 after failing to impress at the club.

=== Wigan ===
Myers joined Wigan, scoring a try on his debut against Sheffield Eagles in September 1990. He played and scored in Wigan's 13–8 victory over St Helens in the 1991 Challenge Cup Final during the 1990–91 season at Wembley Stadium, London on Saturday 27 April 1991, and played on the wing when Joe Lydon missed the game due to injury, and scored a try in the defending champions Wigan's 21–4 victory over the visiting Penrith Panthers in the 1991 World Club Challenge during the 1991–92 season at Anfield, Liverpool on Wednesday 2 October 1991, Shaun Edwards intercepting in his own half and giving the ball to Myers a few yards from the try line. Myers had been picked ahead of Mark Preston by coach John Monie, but ended scoring only half the amount of tries Preston had.

Following the arrival of Martin Offiah, Myers was dropped at Wigan, but was nevertheless selected during the 1992 Great Britain Lions tour of Australia and New Zealand as a replacement for injured players but failed to play in any significant games.

=== Later career ===
In October 1992, Myers was sold to Widnes in an exchange deal which saw Paul Atcheson join Wigan from Widnes. He continued by losing in the Challenge Cup with his new team, Myers played on the wing, in Widnes' 14–20 defeat by Wigan in the 1993 Challenge Cup Final during the 1992–93 season at Wembley Stadium, London on Saturday 1 May 1993.

In 1994, Myers was signed by Bradford Northern for an undisclosed fee.

Myers switched codes to rugby union later in his career, representing Widnes RUFC. He eventually moved into coaching, and was the assistant coach at Bowdon Rugby Club at the time of his death.

== Death ==
Myers died aged 37 in a car accident on the M6 motorway in Sandbach, Cheshire, England. It was confirmed in a coroner's report that Myers was using steroids and amphetamines whilst driving, and died of a heart attack, although the report also concluded that the two drugs had contributed to this.
