= Russ Walker (rugby league) =

English RL coach and former rugby league footballer

Personal information
- Full name: Russ Walker
- Born: 1 September 1962 (age 62); Cumbria, England

Playing information
- Position: Prop, Second-row
Club
Years	Team	Pld	T	G	FG	P
1985–89	Barrow	109	19	0	0	76
1990–95	Hull FC	154	13	0	0	52
	Total	263	32	0	0	128
Representative
Years	Team	Pld	T	G	FG	P
1990–94	Cumbria	3	0	0	0	0

Coaching information
Club
Years	Team	Gms	W	D	L	W%
1994–95	Hull FC	16	5	0	11	31

Russ Walker (born 1 September 1962) is a former professional rugby League footballer who played in the 1980s and 1990s, playing for Barrow and Hull FC, as a prop or second-row.

== Playing career ==
=== Barrow ===
Russ Walker was a tough tackler who combined his career with a job as a milkman, retired from rugby, he now works in the petrochemical industry in Barrow-in-Furness.

=== Hull FC ===
Walker was signed by Hull in January 1990 for a fee of £25,000. He played second-row, and scored a try in Hull FC's 14–4 victory over Widnes in the Premiership Final during the 1990–91 season at Old Trafford, Manchester on Sunday 12 May 1991.

== Coaching career ==
From 1994 to 1995 Walker was joint team coach of Hull FC with Phil Windley.
