= Claude Sirvent =

French rugby league footballer (born 1971)

Personal information
- Born: 6 February 1971 (age 54) Foix, Ariège, Occitania, France

Playing information
- Position: Wing, Centre
Club
Years	Team	Pld	T	G	FG	P
	Saint-Gaudens Bears
Representative
Years	Team	Pld	T	G	FG	P
1992–04	France	32	15	0	0	60

Claude Sirvent (born in Foix, on 6 February 1971) is a French rugby league footballer who represented France at the 2000 World Cup.

Sirvent played in thirty two tests for France between 1992 and 2004 and also played for the Saint-Gaudens Bears, including in the 2002 Challenge Cup.

He made his first steps in rugby league in Vernajoul, which also produced names such as Jacques Moliner, Lilian Hébert and Christophe Moly. Sirvent is considered as the "son of Ariège and of the town of Foix", a region where he hails from. He was capped 46 times and scored 64 points for France.
