= Nathan Gibbs =

Australian rugby league footballer

Personal information
- Born: 22 December 1959 (age 66)

Playing information
- Height: 179 cm (5 ft 10 in)
- Weight: 89 kg (14 st 0 lb)
- Position: Lock, Second-row
Club
Years	Team	Pld	T	G	FG	P
1978–83	South Sydney	86	27	0	0	87
1984	Parramatta Eels	9	2	0	0	8
	Total	95	29	0	0	95

Nathan Gibbs (born 22 December 1959) is an Australian sports physician and former professional rugby league footballer. He played for the South Sydney Rabbitohs and Parramatta Eels in the New South Wales Rugby League (NSWRL) competition.

== Early life and sports career ==
Gibbs was a South Sydney junior but was graded by Eastern Suburbs during his final year at school. He returned to South Sydney and made his first-grade debut in 1978. Gibbs went on to captain the club and was named Dally M Second Rower of the Year in 1980.

== Medical career ==
During the 1990s, he was a team doctor for Manly Warringah, New South Wales and the Australian Kangaroos. In 1990, it was Gibbs who made the decision, controversial at the time, to rule Wally Lewis unfit to play for the Kangaroos. Following the appointment of Chris Anderson as coach of the Kangaroos in 1999, Gibbs was replaced by then Canterbury doctor Hugh Hazard.

Gibbs continues to work in the rugby league arena and was also club doctor for the Sydney Swans where he was appointed Life Membership on 1 October 2010. He was one of the inaugural Fellows of the Australasian College of Sport and Exercise Physicians.
