= Cyrille Pons =

France international rugby league footballer

Personal information
- Born: 28 November 1963 (age 61) Toulouse, France

Playing information
- Position: Wing
Club
| Years | Team | Pld | T | G | FG | P |
|---|---|---|---|---|---|---|
| 1984–95 | Saint-Gaudens |
| 1996–00 | Toulouse Olympique |
| | Total | 0 | 0 | 0 | 0 | 0 |
Representative
| Years | Team | Pld | T | G | FG | P |
| 1987–92 | France | 19 | 0 | 0 | 0 | 32 |
- Relatives: Mathieu Pons (son)

Cyrille Pons (born 28 November 1963) is a French former rugby league player.

== Biography ==
He mostly spent his sports career with Saint-Gaudens with which he won the Championnat de France in 1991 and the Lord Derby Cup (1991 and 1992).

Due to his club performances, he became a regular player for the France national team between 1987 and 1992, playing the 1989-1992 Rugby League World Cup.

After his career, he became a manager of the France national rugby league team.

He is the father of Oldham RLFC and Toulouse Olympique winger Mathieu Pons.

== Honours ==
- Team honours :
  - French Champion : 1991 (Saint-Gaudens).
  - Winner of the Lord Derby Cup : 1991 and 1992 (Saint-Gaudens).
