= Marc Tisseyre =

France international rugby league footballer

Personal information
- Born: 5 August 1964 (age 61) France

Playing information
- Position: Prop
Club
Years	Team	Pld	T	G	FG	P
	Pamiers XIII
	AS Carcassonne
	Total	0	0	0	0	0
Representative
Years	Team	Pld	T	G	FG	P
1988–95	France	11	0	3	0	6

Marc Tisseyre is a French rugby league footballer who represented France at the 1995 World Cup.

== Playing career ==
Tisseyre played for Ariège Pamiers XIII Pyrénées and AS Carcassonne.

Between 1988 and 1995 he played in eleven test matches for France, including one at the 1995 World Cup.
