= Jacques Moliner =

Former France international rugby league footballer

Personal information
- Full name: Jacques Moliner
- Born: 29 January 1967 (age 59) France

Playing information
Club
Years	Team	Pld	T	G	FG	P
19??–19??	FC Lézignan XIII					0
19??–1987	XIII Catalan
1987–1987	Penrith Panthers	1	0	0	0
19??–19??	Pamiers XIII
	Total	1	0	0	0	0
Representative
Years	Team	Pld	T	G	FG	P
1987–91	France	12	1	0	0	3

Jacques Moliner (born 24 January 1967), is a French former professional rugby league footballer who played in the 1980s. His lone appearance was for the Penrith Panthers in 1987. His son Cyril plays for the St. Gaudens Bears. He made his first steps in rugby league in Vernajoul, which also produced names such as Claude Sirvent, Lilian Hébert and Christophe Moly. He was the first French player to play rugby league in Australia.
