= David Gillespie =

Australia international rugby league footballer

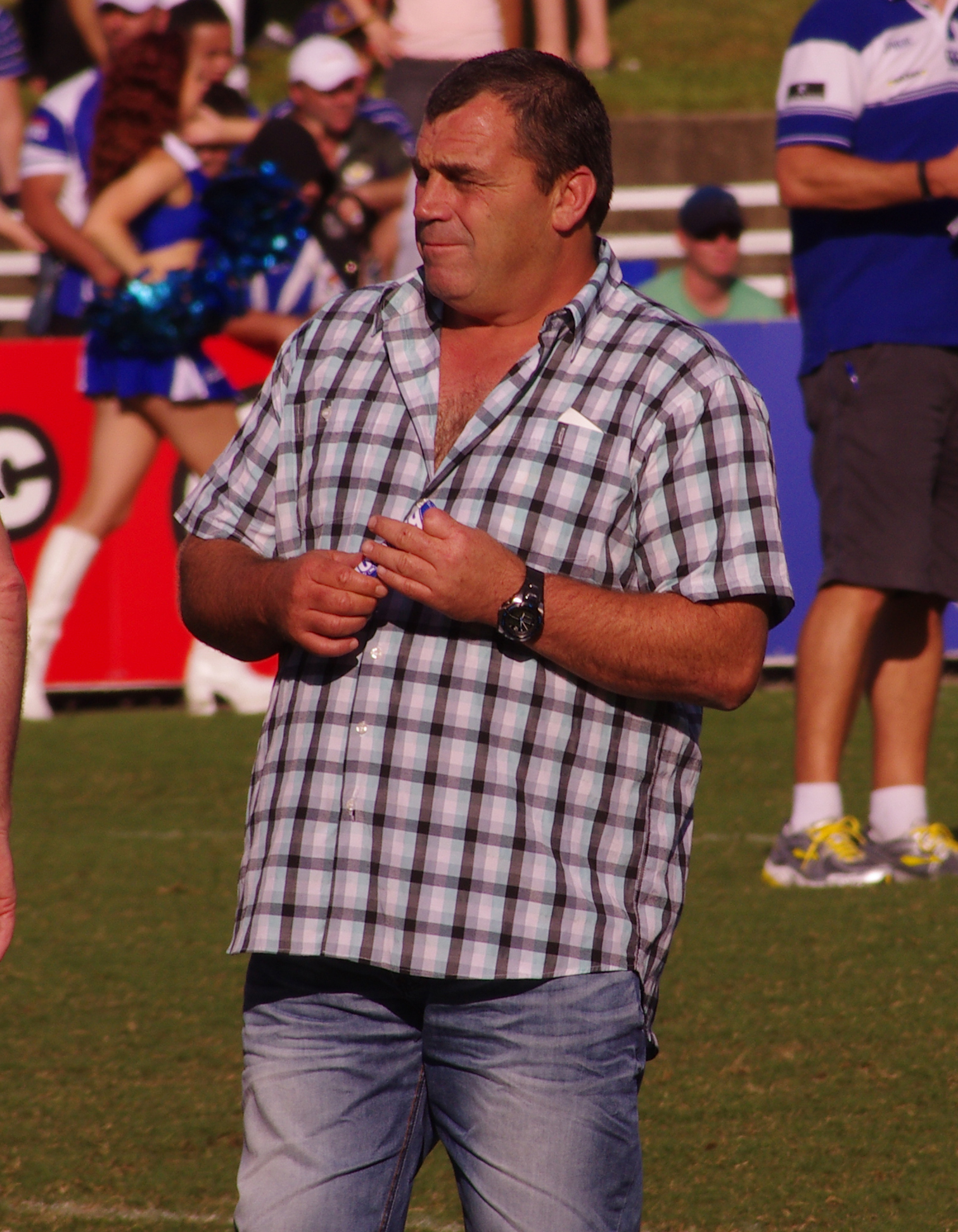

Personal information
- Born: 22 March 1964 (age 62) Narromine, New South Wales, Australia

Playing information
- Height: 180 cm (5 ft 11 in)
- Weight: 95 kg (14 st 13 lb)
- Position: Prop, Second-row
Club
Years	Team	Pld	T	G	FG	P
1984–90	Canterbury Bulldogs	115	13	0	0	52
1987–88	Hunslet
1991–93	Western Suburbs	46	3	0	0	12
1994–97	Manly Sea Eagles	92	1	0	0	4
	Total	253	17	0	0	68
Representative
Years	Team	Pld	T	G	FG	P
1986–97	NSW Country	7	0	0	0	0
1986–94	New South Wales	15	0	0	0	0
1988	President's XIII	1	0	0	0	0
1988–95	Australia	16	3	0	0	12

David "Cement" Gillespie (born 22 March 1964) is an Australian former professional rugby league footballer who played as a second-row and prop forward in the 1980s and 1990s. Gillespie played for the Canterbury-Bankstown Bulldogs, Western Suburbs Magpies, Manly-Warringah Sea Eagles, New South Wales and for the Australian national side.

== Early life ==
Gilliespie was born in Narromine, New South Wales, Australia.

== Professional career ==
Gillespie joined Sydney club Canterbury-Bankstown in 1983 and played reserve grade that year.

He made his first grade début in the 1984 season. His defence was critical to Canterbury's retention of the title against a favoured St. George side in 1985, the Bulldogs winning the Grand Final 7–6 with Gillespie coming off the bench after having scored a rare try in their 26–nil win over Parramatta in the preliminary final.

The following year Gillespie was chosen to play for New South Wales as a replacement in the opening State of Origin. He was favoured to tour England and France with the Kangaroos before severing his index finger in a horrible work accident, which ended his season on the eve of the 1986 finals, where the Bulldogs would eventually lose to Parramatta in the 4–2 Grand Final.

1987 saw two suspensions (in one of which he was sent off on the first tackle of a match against Balmain) resulted in Gillespie missing over a third of his season. He played for English side Hunslet during the 1987–88 Rugby Football League season. Returning to Australia "Cement" came back stronger in 1988 and capped off his season by scoring a try in Canterbury's 24–12 Grand Final victory over Balmain and was subsequently chosen for Australia in the World Cup final against New Zealand.

In 1990, Gillespie finally established himself as a regular representative player with powerful displays for New South Wales and in the Test against France in Parkes. At the end of the 1990 NSWRL season, he went on the 1990 Kangaroo tour of Great Britain and France and played in three more tests on tour. He placed himself in the draft and was chosen by Western Suburbs, where he was re-united with former Bulldogs Coach Warren Ryan who was now in charge of the Magpies. Now a mainstay in the National side, Gillespie's high work rate was a vital part of two big wins against New Zealand in 1991 and against Great Britain during the 1992 Great Britain Lions tour of Australia and New Zealand, helping Australia retain The Ashes.

1993 saw Gillespie fall out with the Magpies for 1994 and he would sign with Manly and consequently play under Australian coach Bob Fulton. However, the quicker 10-metre rule made his play – based on workrate – less effective and he lost in place in the NSW team after one match.

In 1995, Gillespie was an integral part of a Manly team that threatened to march through the season undefeated. The Sea Eagles won their first fifteen matches before losing controversially to Sydney City in a match where Roosters' coach (and Gillespie's former premiership mentor) Phil Gould threatened a walk-off with his team leading. The Sea Eagles would go into the Grand Final with a record of 22 wins and 2 losses but lost 17–4 to Gillespie's former Canterbury-Bankstown club. He would play for Australia for the final time that season against New Zealand. Gillespie would taste premiership success for a third time when he played in Manly's 20–8 1996 Grand Final win over St. George, but would retire the following season after the Sea Eagles' last-second 22–16 loss to Newcastle in the isolated 1997 ARL Grand Final.
