= David Fraisse =

Former France international rugby league footballer & club coach

Personal information
- Born: 20 December 1968 (age 57) Saint-Vallier, Drôme, Auvergne-Rhône-Alpes, France

Playing information

Rugby league
- Position: Fullback, Wing, Centre, Stand-off
Club
Years	Team	Pld	T	G	FG	P
1985–89	Le Pontet
1989–93	AS Carcassonne
1993–94	Sheffield Eagles		19	1	0	78
1994–95	Bradford Northern		6	0	0	24
1995–96	Workington Town		5	0	1	21
1996–97	Carpentras XIII
	Total	0	30	1	1	123
Representative
Years	Team	Pld	T	G	FG	P
1987–95	France	21	6	6	0	36

Rugby union
Club
Years	Team	Pld	T	G	FG	P
1998–00	Toulon
2000–??	La Valette
	Total	0	0	0	0	0
- Source: As of 18 January 2021

David Fraisse (born Saint-Vallier, on 20 December 1966) is a French rugby union coach and former rugby league footballer who played in the 1980s and 1990s. He played representative rugby league for France at the 1995 Rugby League World Cup.

== Playing career ==
Fraisse first played for France in 1987. In 1993–94 Fraisse spent the season with the Sheffield Eagles. He then spent a season at Bradford Northern, before joining Workington Town. His twenty-first and last international match was at the 1995 World Cup.

== Coaching career ==
Fraisse is currently coaching the defence for RC Toulonnais.
