= 1989–1992 Rugby League World Cup players =

The 1985–1988 Rugby League World Cup involved players from the national rugby league football teams of five countries: Australia, France, Great Britain, New Zealand and Papua New Guinea. As the World Cup was played over four years during normal international tours, these groups of players never assembled in one place as an entire squad.

== Australia ==
- Coaches: (Australia) Bob Fulton
1. Tim Brasher
2. Willie Carne
3. Steve Renouf
4. Mal Meninga (c)
5. Michael Hancock
6. Brad Fittler
7. Allan Langer
8. Glenn Lazarus
9. Steve Walters
10. Mark Sargent
11. Paul Sironen
12. Bob Lindner
13. Bradley Clyde
14. Chris Johns
15. John Cartwright
16. David Gillespie
17. Kevin Walters
18. Gary Belcher
19. Michael O'Connor
20. Tony Currie
21. Wally Lewis
22. Des Hasler
23. Sam Backo
24. Tony Currie
25. Paul Vautin
26. Bruce McGuire
27. Dale Shearer
28. Mark Carroll
29. Alan Langer
30. Andrew Ettingshausen
31. Martin Bella
32. Brad Mackay
33. Laurie Daley
34. Kerrod Walters
35. Mark McGaw
36. Cliff Lyons
37. Greg Alexander
38. Ricky Stuart
39. Ben Elias
40. Rod Wishart
41. Craig Salvatori
42. Mark Geyer
43. Geoff Toovey
44. Gary Coyne
45. Scott Gourley

== France ==
- Coach: (France) Jacques Jorda/ (France) Michel Mazaré
1. Pierre Aillères (Toulouse Olympique)
2. Adolphe Alésina (XIII Catalan)
3. Christophe Auroy (XIII Catalan)
4. Abdrajah Baba (XIII Catalan)
5. Jean-Marc Balleroy (Avignon)
6. Pascal Bomati (XIII Catalan)
7. Christophe Bonnafous (Albi)
8. Alain Bouzer (Pamiers)
9. Gérard Boyals (Saint-Gaudens)
10. Thierry Bernabé (Le Pontet)
11. Denis Biénès (Saint-Gaudens)
12. Thierry Buttignol (Avignon)
13. Didier Cabestany (XIII Catalan)
14. Éric Castel (Albi)
15. Pierre Chamorin (Saint-Estève)
16. Philippe Chiron (Carpentras)
17. Régis Courty (XIII Catalan)
18. Guy Delaunay (XIII Catalan)
19. Lindsay Delpech (Pamiers)
20. David Despin (Villeneuve-sur-Lot)
21. Daniel Divet (Carcassonne)
22. Gilles Dumas (Saint-Gaudens)
23. Patrick Entat (Avignon)
24. Pascal Fages (Pia)
25. Philippe Fourquet (Saint-Gaudens)
26. David Fraisse (Carcassonne)
27. Jean-Marc Garcia (Saint-Estève)
28. Mathieu Khedimi (Saint-Estève)
29. Patrick Limongi (Carcassonne)
30. Bernard Llong (XIII Catalan)
31. Francis Lope (Toulouse)
32. Jean-Pierre Magnac (XIII Catalan)
33. Patrick Marginet (Saint-Estève)
34. Jacques Moliner (Pamiers)
35. Pierre Montgaillard (XIII Catalan)
36. Roger Palisses (Saint-Estève)
37. Jacques Pech (Pia)
38. Bertrand Planté (Villeneuve-sur-Lot)
39. Cyrille Pons (Saint-Gaudens)
40. Jean-Philippe Pougeau (Saint-Estève)
41. Jean-Luc Rabot (Villeneuve-sur-Lot)
42. Hugues Ratier (Lézignan)
43. Éric Rémirez (Carcassonne)
44. Franck Romano (Carpentras)
45. Jean Ruiz (Saint-Estève)
46. Claude Sirvent (Saint-Gaudens)
47. Yves Storer (Saint-Gaudens)
48. Marc Tisseyre (Carcassonne)
49. Patrick Torreilles (Pia)
50. Thierry Valéro (Lézignan)
51. Daniel Verdès (Vileneuve-sur-Lot)
52. Yves Villoni (Pamiers)
53. Robert Vizcay (Saint-Gaudens)

== Great Britain ==
- Coach: (United Kingdom) Malcolm Reilly
1. Alan Tait
2. Phil Ford
3. Paul Newlove
4. Paul Loughlin
5. Martin Offiah
6. Shaun Edwards
7. David Hulme
8. Paul Hulme
9. Kelvin Skerrett
10. Andy Platt
11. Andy Goodway
12. Roy Powell
13. Mike Gregory
14. Joe Lydon
15. Keith England
16. Karl Fairbank
17. Paul Dixon
18. Jonathan Davies
19. Paul Moriarty
20. Michael Jackson
21. Daryl Powell
22. Denis Betts
23. Lee Jackson
24. Paul Eastwood
25. Carl Gibson
26. Steve Hampson
27. Ellery Hanley
28. Bobbie Goulding
29. Garry Schofield
30. Shaun Irwin
31. St John Ellis
32. Ian Lucas
33. Richie Eyres
34. Les Holliday
35. Mark Aston
36. Karl Harrison
37. Gary Price
38. Gary Connolly
39. Martin Dermott
40. Phil Clarke
41. Graham Steadman
42. Billy McGinty

== New Zealand ==
- Coach: (New Zealand) Tony Gordon/ (New Zealand) Bob Bailey (New Zealand) Howie Tamati

Player	Position	Date of birth	Club	Games	Points
Dean Bell	Centre	29 April 1962	Wigan	2	4
Richie Blackmore	Centre	2 July 1969	Castleford	3	20
Frano Botica	Fullback	3 August 1963	Wigan	8	0
Peter Brown	Prop	1 September 1961	Halifax	4	0
Dean Clark	Stand-off	6 January 1968	Hull	3	8
Morvin Edwards	Fullback	8 May 1968	Leeds	2	0
Mark Elia	Wing	25 December 1962	Halifax	1	4
Esene Faimalo	Prop	11 October 1966	Widnes	2	0
Gary Freeman	Halfback	4 December 1962	Balmain	8	4
Clayton Friend	Halfback	22 March 1962	North Sydney	2	4
James Goulding	Second-row	27 March 1966	Newcastle	1	0
Daryl Halligan	Fullback	25 July 1966	North Sydney	1	6
Gavin Hill	Second-row	11 December 1965	Canterbury	1	4
Sean Hoppe	Wing	19 January 1971	Canberra	1	4
Mark Horo	Wing	19 May 1960	Parramatta	2	0
Kevin Iro	Centre	24 May 1968	Wigan	5	4
Tony Iro	Wing	30 May 1967	Manly Warringah	2	0
Tony Kemp	Stand-off	18 January 1968	Newcastle	8	0
Emosi Koloto	Second-row	23 January 1965	Widnes	2	0
Mike Kuiti	Second-row	18 March 1963	Leeds	2	4
Francis Leota	Second-row	28 May 1964	Sheffield	2	0
Dean Lonergan	Second-row	28 August 1965	Canberra	3	4
Duane Mann	Hooker	28 June 1965	Warrington	8	4
George Mann	Prop	31 July 1965	St Helens	4	0
Jarrod McCracken	Centre	27 March 1970	Canterbury	2	4
Hugh McGahan	Lock	15 November 1961	Eastern Suburbs	4	1
Gary Mercer	Fullback	22 June 1966	Warrington	5	4
Tawera Nikau	Lock	1 January 1967	Castleford	5	4
Mark Nixon	Stand-off	5 February 1968	Rochdale	1	0
Sam Panapa	Wing	14 May 1963	Wigan	3	8
Mike Patton	Stand-off	10 January 1966	Auckland	3	0
Quentin Pongia	Prop	9 July 1970	Canberra	1	0
Matthew Ridge	Fullback	27 August 1968	Manly Warringah	3	30
Tea Ropati	Centre	7 September 1964	St Helens	1	0
Kelly Shelford	Stand-off	4 May 1966	Warrington	4	16
Kurt Sherlock	Five-eighth	31 December 1962	Eastern Suburbs	2	6
Kurt Sorensen	Second-row	8 November 1956	Widnes	1	0
Sam Stewart	Second-row	5 December 1962	Newcastle	3	0
Brent Stuart	Prop	19 August 1965	Halifax	1	4
Brent Todd	Prop	5 December 1964	Canberra	8	0
Paddy Tuimavave	Fullback	4 April 1964	Workington Town	1	0
Brendon Tuuta	Stand-off	29 April 1965	Western Suburbs	2	0
Dave Watson	Fullback	24 May 1966	Halifax	4	20
Darrell Williams	Fullback	30 August 1963	Manly Warringah	4	4
Jason Williams	Wing	23 April 1966	South Sydney	1	0
Mark Woods	Prop	4 July 1965	Wellington	1	0

== Papua New Guinea ==
- Coach: (Papua New Guinea) Skerry Palanga
1. Ipisa Wanega
2. Arnold Krewanty
3. Phillip Boge
4. Bal Numapo
5. Mea Morea
6. Stanley Haru
7. Gigmai Ongugo
8. Ati Lomutopa
9. Michael Matmillo
10. Tuiyo Evei
11. Joe Gispe
12. Arebo Taumaku
13. Michael Angara
14. Max Tiri
15. Chris Itam
16. Kes Paglipari
17. Matthew Elara
18. Opoe Soga
19. Bobby Ako
20. Goie Waine
21. Elias Kamiak
22. Paul Gela
23. James Naipo
24. Bernard Bate
25. John Unagi
26. Thomas Daki
27. Joshua Kououru
28. Johannes Kola
29. Liprin Palangat
30. Richard Wagambie - (Carpentras (France)
31. Korul Sinemau
32. Danny Moi
33. Daroa Ben-Moide
34. Ngala Lapan
35. Kera Ngaffin
36. Tuksy Karu
37. Leslie Hoffman
38. Nande Yer
39. John Piel
40. Aquila Emil
41. Ben Biri
42. Kini Tani
43. Sauna Babago
44. James Kapia
45. Joe Rema
