= 1990 Great Britain Lions tour =

Rugby tour series

- Date: 20 May 1990 – 15 July 1990
- Manager: Maurice Lindsay
- Coach(es): Mal Reilly
- Tour captain(s): Mike Gregory
- Top point scorer(s): Jonathan Davies (92)
- Top try scorer(s): Paul Eastwood (9)
Summary
P	W	D	L
Total
15	10	0	5
Test match
5	3	0	2
Opponent
P	W	D	L
Papua New Guinea
2	1	0	1
New Zealand
3	2	0	1

Tour chronology
- Previous tour: 1988
- Next tour: 1992

The 1990 Great Britain Lions tour was a tour by the Great Britain national rugby league team of Papua New Guinea and New Zealand which took place from May to July 1990.

== Touring squad ==
An initial 28-man squad was selected for the tour in April 1990. Warrington's Des Drummond and Widnes' David Hulme and Paul Hulme were all unavailable for selection for "private reasons".

Ellery Hanley, Shaun Edwards, Andy Platt and Paul Loughlin all withdrew from the originally selected squad due to injury, while Steve Hampson and Les Holliday withdrew for personal reasons. Mike Gregory was chosen as tour captain as a result of the absence of Hanley and Edwards.

Name	Club	Apps	Tests	Tries	Goals	Drop goals	Points	Notes
Denis Betts	Wigan	10	5	4	0	0	16	
Chris Bibb	Featherstone Rovers	8	1	1	0	0	4	
David Bishop	Hull Kingston Rovers	6	0	1	0	0	4	
Phil Clarke	Wigan	7	1	1	0	0	4	
Jonathan Davies	Widnes	11	5	6	34	0	92	
Martin Dermott	Wigan	8	2	1	0	1	5	
John Devereux	Widnes	5	0	2	0	0	8	(Note: Anthony Sullivan returned home without playing a match during the tour after suffering an injury in training. He was replaced by John Devereux.)
Paul Dixon	Leeds	10	5	2	0	0	8	
Paul Eastwood	Hull	10	2	9	18	0	72	
Keith England	Castleford	10	5	0	0	0	0	
Karl Fairbank	Bradford Northern	7	1	2	0	0	8	
Deryck Fox	Featherstone Rovers	9	1	2	0	0	8	
Carl Gibson	Leeds	11	5	6	0	0	24	
Bobbie Goulding	Wigan	9	5	2	0	1	9	
Mike Gregory (c)	Warrington	9	5	0	0	0	0	
Shaun Irwin	Castleford	9	3	1	0	0	4	
Lee Jackson	Hull	7	3	0	0	0	0	
Ian Lucas	Wigan	6	0	0	0	0	0	
Joe Lydon	Wigan	6	3	0	0	0	0	
David Lyon	Warrington	2	0	2	0	0	8	(Note: Alan Tait returned home due to injury during the New Zealand leg of the tour. His replacement was David Lyon.)
Martin Offiah	Widnes	4	3	2	0	0	8	
Daryl Powell	Sheffield Eagles	5	5	0	0	0	0	
Roy Powell	Leeds	11	5	1	0	0	4	
Gary Price	Wakefield Trinity	6	0	1	0	0	4	
Garry Schofield	Leeds	9	5	7	0	1	29	
Roger Simpson	Bradford Northern	5	0	3	0	0	12	
Kelvin Skerrett	Bradford Northern	5	3	1	0	0	4	
Ian Smales	Featherstone Rovers	7	0	1	0	0	4	
Graham Steadman	Castleford	4	0	1	0	0	4	(Note: Graham Steadman was sent home due to injury during the New Zealand leg of the tour. No replacement was called up.)
Anthony Sullivan	Hull Kingston Rovers	0	0	0	0	0	0	
Alan Tait	Widnes	4	2	1	0	0	4	

== Papua New Guinea ==
20 May 1990	Southern Zone	18 – 40	Great Britain	Lloyd Robson Oval, Port Moresby
	Tries: Igo, P. Lae, Ganiga; Goals: P. Lae (3)	[Report Report]	Tries: Garry Schofield (3), Paul Eastwood (2), Jonathan Davies, Carl Gibson; Goals: Jonathan Davies (6)	Attendance: 5,066; Referee: Graham Anui (Papua New Guinea)

23 May 1990	Northern and Highland Zones	10 – 24	Great Britain	Lae Oval, Lae
	Tries: Elara; Goals: Sambu (3)	[Report Report]	Tries: Chris Bibb, Paul Dixon, Roger Simpson, Jonathan Davies; Goals: Paul Eastwood (4)	Attendance: 2,550; Referee: Aiwa Olni (Papua New Guinea)

=== First Test ===
27 May 1990

Papua New Guinea	20 – 18	Great Britain
Tries: Tuiyo Evei; Stanley Haru Goals: Bal Numapo (5); Field Goal: Bal Numapo (1); Stanley Haru (1)		Try: Paul Eastwood; Jonathan Davies; Bobbie Goulding; Goals: Jonathan Davies (3)

Danny Leahy Oval, Goroka
Attendance: 11,598
Referee: Dennis Hale (New Zealand)

Papua New Guinea	Great Britain

FB	1	Ipisa Wanega
RW	2	Arnold Krewanty
RC	3	Phillip Boge
LC	4	Bal Numapo
LW	5	Mea Morea
FE	6	Stanley Haru
HB	7	Gigmai Onguglo
PR	8	Bobby Ako
HK	9	Michael Matmillo
PR	10	Tuyio Evei
SR	11	Joe Gispe
SR	12	Arebo Taumaku (c)
LK	13	Michael Angara
Substitutions:
IC	14	Goru Arigae
IC	15	Noah Kool
Coach:
(Papua New Guinea) Skerry Palanga

FB	1	Alan Tait
RW	2	Paul Eastwood
RC	3	Daryl Powell
LC	4	Jonathan Davies
LW	5	Carl Gibson
SO	6	Garry Schofield
SH	7	Bobbie Goulding
PR	8	Roy Powell
HK	9	Lee Jackson
PR	10	Paul Dixon
SR	11	Denis Betts
SR	12	Karl Fairbank
LK	13	Mike Gregory (c)
Substitutions:
IC	14	Shaun Irwin
IC	15	Keith England
Coach:
(England) Mal Reilly

30 May 1990	Island Zone	4 – 50	Great Britain	Queen Elizabeth Oval, Rabaul
		[Report Report]		Attendance: 3,538; Referee: Moses Tolingling (New Ireland)

=== Second Test ===
This was Great Britain's second match in the 1989-1992 Rugby League World Cup

2 June 1990

Papua New Guinea	8 – 40	Great Britain
Tries: Gigmai Ongugo Goals: Bal Numapo (2)		Tries: Carl Gibson (2); Paul Eastwood; Bobbie Goulding; Paul Dixon; Daryl Powell; Garry Schofield; Goals: Jonathan Davies (6)

Lloyd Robson Oval, Port Moresby
Attendance: 7,837
Referee: Dennis Hale (New Zealand)

Papua New Guinea	Great Britain

FB	1	Ipisa Wanega
RW	2	Arnold Krewanty
RC	3	Phillip Boge
LC	4	Bal Numapo
LW	5	Mea Morea
FE	6	Stanley Haru
HB	7	Gigmai Ongugo
PR	8	Ati Lomutopa
HK	9	Michael Matmillo
PR	10	Tuyio Evei
SR	11	Joe Gispe
SR	12	Aribo Taumaku (c)
LK	13	Michael Angara
Substitutions:
IC	14	Max Tiri
IC	15	Chris Itam
Coach:
(Papua New Guinea) Skerry Palanga

FB	1	Alan Tait
RW	2	Paul Eastwood
RC	3	Jonathan Davies
LC	4	Daryl Powell
LW	5	Carl Gibson
SO	6	Garry Schofield
SH	7	Bobbie Goulding
PR	8	Roy Powell
HK	9	Lee Jackson
PR	10	Keith England
SR	11	Denis Betts
SR	12	Paul Dixon
LK	13	Mike Gregory (c)
Substitutions:
IC	14	Deryck Fox
IC	15	Phil Clarke
Coach:
(England) Mal Reilly

== Test Venues ==
The three tests took place at the following venues.

Palmerston North	Auckland	Christchurch
Palmerston North Showgrounds	Mount Smart Stadium	Queen Elizabeth II Park
Capacity: 15,000	Capacity: 35,000	Capacity: 25,000

== New Zealand ==
10 June 1990	Presidents XIII	22 – 23	Great Britain	McLean Park, Napier
	Tries: Mark Nixon (2), Sam Panapa, P.Tuimavave; Goals: Morvin Edwards (3)	[Report Report]	Tries: Carl Gibson, Martin Dermott, Jonathan Davies; Goals: Paul Eastwood (5); Field Goals: Garry Schofield	Attendance: 3,163; Referee: Jim Stokes

Presidents XIII: Morvin Edwards, Warren Mann, Mark Nixon, Paddy Tuimavave, Sam Panapa, Dean Clark, Stu Galbraith, Adrian Shelford, Peter Ropati, George Mann, Taime Tagaloa, Francis Leota, Mike Kuiti. Res – Kelly Shelford, Esene Faimalo

Great Britain: Chris Bibb, John Devereux, Daryl Powell, Jonathan Davies, Carl Gibson, Garry Schofield, Bobbie Goulding, Ian Lucas, Martin Dermott, Keith England, Denis Betts, Paul Dixon, Phil Clarke. Res – Roy Powell, David Bishop

13 June 1990	Canterbury	18 – 10	Great Britain	Addington Showgrounds, Christchurch
	Tries: Dorreen, Whittaker, Leek; Goals: Cully (3)	[Report Report]	Tries: David Bishop, Alan Tait; Goals: Paul Eastwood (1)	Attendance: 1,338; Referee: Dennis Hale

Canterbury: Hall, Whetu Taewa, Michael Dorreen, Rodger, Kaisa, Mark Nixon, Aaron Whittaker, Ricky Cowan, Wayne Wallace, Simanu, Leck, Culley, Logan Edwards. Res – Angell, Seru.

Great Britain: Alan Tait, Paul Eastwood, Shaun Irwin, Joe Lydon (c), Roger Simpson, Graham Steadman, Deryck Fox, Ian Lucas, Lee Jackson, Karl Fairbank, Ian Smales, Gary Price, David Bishop. Res – Roy Powell, Mike Gregory

17 June 1990	Auckland	24 – 13	Great Britain	Carlaw Park, Auckland
	Tries: Sam Panapa (2), Mike Patton, Tawera Nikau; Goals: Peter Brown (4)	[Report Report]	Tries: Kelvin Skerrett, Graham Steadman; Goals: Jonathan Davies (2); Field Goals: Bobbie Goulding	Attendance: 7,614; Referee: Keith Blackler

Auckland: Paddy Tuimavave, Mike Patton, Sam Panapa, Iva Ropati, Warren Mann, Mike McClennan, Stu Galbraith, Peter Brown, Peter Ropati, Se'e Solomona, Tawera Nikau, Taime Tagaloa, Tony Tuimavave. Res – Francis Leota

Great Britain: Chris Bibb, Carl Gibson, Joe Lydon, Garry Schofield, Jonathan Davies, Graham Steadman, Bobbie Goulding, Kelvin Skerrett, Martin Dermott, Keith England, Denis Betts, Roy Powell, Mike Gregory (c). Res – Alan Tait, Paul Dixon

20 June 1990	Kiwi Colts	10 – 22	Great Britain	Davies Park, Huntly
	Tries: Iva Ropati, Fisher; Goals: Kelly Shelford (1)	[Report Report]	Tries: Paul Eastwood (3), Phil Clarke; Goals: Jonathan Davies (3)	Attendance: 972; Referee: Jim Stokes

Kiwi Colts: Paul Nahu, Hall, Iva Ropati, Mike Patton, Whetu Taewa, Kelly Shelford, Stu Galbraith, John Lomax, Fisher, Simcott, Taime Tagaloa, Logan Edwards, Tony Tuimavave. Res – Rodger, Quentin Pongia

Great Britain: Roger Simpson, Paul Eastwood, Shaun Irwin, Daryl Powell, John Devereux, Jonathan Davies, Deryck Fox, Roy Powell, Lee Jackson, Karl Fairbank, Phil Clarke, Ian Smales, David Bishop. Res – Gary Price

=== First Test ===
24 June 1990

New Zealand	10 – 11	Great Britain
Tries: Kevin Iro; Sam Panapa; Goals: Peter Brown (1/4)		Tries: Jonathan Davies; Carl Gibson; Goals: Jonathan Davies (1/3); Field Goals: Garry Schofield

Palmerston North Showgrounds, Palmerston North
Attendance: 8,073
Referee: David Manson (Australia)

New Zealand	Great Britain

FB	1	Darrell Williams
RW	2	Tony Iro
RC	3	Kevin Iro
LC	4	Tony Kemp
LW	5	Sam Panapa
FE	6	Dean Clark
HB	7	Gary Freeman
PR	8	Brent Todd
HK	9	Duane Mann
PR	10	Peter Brown
SR	11	Tawera Nikau
SR	12	Mark Horo
LF	13	Hugh McGahan (c)
Substitutions:
IC	14	Morvin Edwards
IC	15	George Mann
Coach:
(New Zealand) Bob Bailey

FB	1	Chris Bibb
RW	2	Jonathan Davies
RC	3	Joe Lydon
LC	4	Carl Gibson
LW	5	Martin Offiah
SO	6	Garry Schofield
SH	7	Bobbie Goulding
PR	8	Kelvin Skerrett
HK	9	Martin Dermott
PR	10	Keith England
SR	11	Denis Betts
SR	12	Paul Dixon
LK	13	Mike Gregory (c)
Substitutions:
IC	14	Darryl Powell
IC	15	Roy Powell
Coach:
(England) Mal Reilly

27 June 1990	Wellington	30 – 22	Great Britain	Basin Reserve, Wellington
	Tries: Molemau, Victor Aramoana, Morvin Edwards, Geoffrey Tangira; Goals: Gilbert (7)	[Report Report]	Tries: Karl Fairbank, Ian Smales, Jonathan Davies, David Lyon; Goals: Jonathan Davies (3)	Attendance: 845; Referee: Neville Kesha

Wellington: Peter Edwards, Molemau, David Ewe, Morvin Edwards, Victor Aramoana, Gilbert, Geoffrey Tangira, John Lomax, Barry Harvey (c), Robert Piva, O'Sullivan, Esene Faimalo, Mike Kuiti.

Great Britain: David Lyon, Paul Eastwood, Shaun Irwin, Daryl Powell, John Devereux, Jonathan Davies, Deryck Fox, Ian Lucas, Lee Jackson, Karl Fairbank, Ian Smales, Gary Price, Phil Clarke Res – Paul Dixon, David Bishop

1 July 1990	Māori	12 – 20	Great Britain	Rotorua International Stadium, Rotorua
	Tries: G. Tangira, Victor Aramoana; Goals: Morvin Edwards (2)	[Report Report]	Tries: Garry Schofield, Denis Betts, Paul Eastwood; Goals: Paul Eastwood (4)	Attendance: 3,184; Referee: Des O'Sullivan

New Zealand Māori: Morvin Edwards, Sean Hoppe, Nahu, Dave Watson, Victor Aramoana, Kelly Shelford, Geoffrey Tangira, John Lomax, Barry Harvey, Jason Lowrie, Tawera Nikau, Mike Kuiti, Ramsey.

Great Britain: Chris Bibb, Paul Eastwood, Carl Gibson, Daryl Powell, Martin Offiah, Garry Schofield, Deryck Fox, Roy Powell, Martin Dermott, Keith England, Denis Betts, Paul Dixon, Mike Gregory (c). Res – Bobbie Goulding, Joe Lydon

4 July 1990	Taranaki	0 – 24	Great Britain	Pukekura Park, New Plymouth
	Tries: Goals:	[Report Report]	Tries: Roger Simpson, David Lyon, Karl Fairbank, Shaun Irwin; Goals: Paul Eastwood (4)	Attendance: 2,675; Referee: Dennis Hale

Taranaki: Tumoana, W. Tangira, Gwiazdzinski, Dave Watson, R. Nixon, Smith, Geoffrey Tangira, Robert Piva, Mason, Katene, McAllister, Kitto, Barry Harvey. Res – Martin, Jackson.

Great Britain: Chris Bibb, Paul Eastwood, Shaun Irwin, David Lyon, John Devereux, Roger Simpson, Deryck Fox, Ian Lucas, Ian Smales, Karl Fairbank, Gary Price, Phil Clarke, David Bishop. Res – Roy Powell, Martin Dermott

=== Second Test ===
Former All Blacks understudy fullback Matthew Ridge made his test debut for New Zealand in the second test (as he'd never actually played a test for the All Blacks, this wouldn't count him as a dual international). To this point in his career, Ridge had only played 6 games of rugby league for NSWRL club Manly-Warringah before becoming a dual international. His selection saw his Manly teammate Darrell Williams moved from fullback to the centres and Tony Kemp moved to the bench. Ridge, who would end his rugby league career in 1999 having scored over 1,600 points (with a goal kicking accuracy of around 80%), also took over the goal kicking from Peter Brown.

8 July 1990

New Zealand	14 – 16	Great Britain
Tries: Mark Horo Goals: Matthew Ridge (5/8)		Tries: Denis Betts; Martin Offiah; Garry Schofield; Goals: Jonathan Davies (2/3)

Mt Smart Stadium, Auckland
Attendance: 7,843
Referee: Bill Harrigan (Australia)

New Zealand	Great Britain

FB	1	Matthew Ridge
RW	2	Tony Iro
RC	3	Kevin Iro
LC	4	Darrell Williams
LW	5	Sam Panapa
FE	6	Dean Clark
HB	7	Gary Freeman
PR	8	Brent Todd
HK	9	Duane Mann
PR	10	Peter Brown
SR	11	Tawera Nikau
SR	12	Mark Horo
LF	13	Hugh McGahan (c)
Substitutions:
IC	14	Dean Lonergan
IC	15	Tony Kemp
Coach:
(New Zealand) Bob Bailey

FB	1	Joe Lydon
RW	2	Jonathan Davies
RC	3	Darryl Powell
LC	4	Carl Gibson
LW	5	Martin Offiah
SO	6	Garry Schofield
SH	7	Bobbie Goulding
PR	8	Kelvin Skerrett
HK	9	Lee Jackson
PR	10	Keith England
SR	11	Denis Betts
SR	12	Paul Dixon
LK	13	Mike Gregory (c)
Substitutions:
IC	14	Shaun Irwin
IC	15	Roy Powell
Coach:
(England) Mal Reilly

=== Third Test ===
This was part of the 1989-1992 Rugby League World Cup

15 July 1990

New Zealand	21 – 18	Great Britain
Tries: Tony Kemp; Tawera Nikau Goals: Matthew Ridge (6/7); Field Goals: Hugh McGahan		Tries: Martin Offiah; Roy Powell; Garry Schofield; Goals: Jonathan Davies (3/4)

Queen Elizabeth II Park, Christchurch
Attendance: 3,113
Referee: Bill Harrigan (Australia)

New Zealand	Great Britain

FB	1	Matthew Ridge
RW	2	Tony Iro
RC	3	Kevin Iro
LC	4	Darrell Williams
LW	5	Sam Panapa
FE	6	Tony Kemp
HB	7	Gary Freeman
PR	8	Brent Todd
HK	9	Duane Mann
PR	10	Peter Brown
SR	11	Tawera Nikau
SR	12	Mark Horo
LF	13	Hugh McGahan (c)
Substitutions:
IC	14	Dean Lonergan
IC	15	Morvin Edwards
Coach:
(New Zealand) Bob Bailey

FB	1	Joe Lydon
RW	2	Jonathan Davies
RC	3	Darryl Powell
LC	4	Carl Gibson
LW	5	Martin Offiah
SO	6	Garry Schofield
SH	7	Bobbie Goulding
PR	8	Kelvin Skerrett
HK	9	Martin Dermott
PR	10	Keith England
SR	11	Denis Betts
SR	12	Roy Powell
LK	13	Mike Gregory (c)
Substitutions:
IC	14	Paul Dixon
IC	15	Shaun Irwin
Coach:
(England) Mal Reilly
