= 1991 Kangaroo tour of Papua New Guinea =

1991 rugby league tour

The 1991 Kangaroo tour of Papua New Guinea was a two-week, end of season tour of Papua New Guinea by the Australia national rugby league team. The Australians played five matches on the tour, including two Test matches against the Papua New Guinea Kumuls. The tour began on 29 September and finished on 13 October.

As of 2025 this remains the only full Kangaroo Tour of Papua New Guinea.

== Leadership ==
As he had been since 1989, Bob Fulton was the coach of the Kangaroos. As he had been since 1990, Mal Meninga was the Kangaroos team captain.

== Touring squad ==
Eleven of the 23 man squad had played for Australia in their 2-1 Trans-Tasman Test series win over New Zealand earlier in the year. Among those selected to tour but who were ultimately ruled out with injury was Penrith's incumbent Test back rower and 1991 premiership winner Mark Geyer who also missed playing in the World Club Challenge (WCC) game against English champions Wigan due to an ankle injury that required surgery (the WCC was played 4 days before the first Test in Goroka). Also missing were Canberra Raiders halves Laurie Daley and Ricky Stuart as well as Brisbane Broncos Test half Allan Langer, with Manly-Warringah 5/8 Cliff Lyons earning a Test recall while his Sea Eagles halves partner Geoff Toovey was called up for his first taste of international football.

Player	Club	Position(s)	Games	Tests	Tries	Goals	F/Goals	Points
Gary Belcher	Canberra Raiders	Fullback	5	2	3	10	–	32
Martin Bella	Manly-Warringah Sea Eagles	Prop	5	2	–	–	–	–
Willie Carne	Brisbane Broncos	Wing	5	2	8	–	–	32
Bradley Clyde	Canberra Raiders	Lock, Second-row	4	2	3	–	–	12
Gary Coyne	Canberra Raiders	Second-row, Prop	4	2	–	–	–	–
Andrew Ettingshausen	Cronulla-Sutherland Sharks	Centre	4	2	3	–	–	12
Brad Fittler	Penrith Panthers	Lock, Centre	5	2	4	–	–	16
Andrew Gee	Brisbane Broncos	Second-row	1	0	–	–	–	–
Scott Gourley	St George Dragons	Second-row, Lock	4	1	3	–	–	12
Peter Jackson	North Sydney Bears	Five-eighth, Centre	4	1	3	–	–	12
Chris Johns	Brisbane Broncos	Wing, Centre	5	2	2	–	–	8
Glenn Lazarus	Canberra Raiders	Prop	5	2	1	–	–	4
Cliff Lyons	Manly-Warringah Sea Eagles	Five-eighth	5	2	3	–	–	12
Mark McGaw	Cronulla-Sutherland Sharks	Centre	1	0	–	–	–	–
Bruce McGuire	Canterbury-Bankstown Bulldogs	Second-row	1	0	–	–	–	–
Mal Meninga (c)	Canberra Raiders	Centre	3	2	2	6	–	20
Steve Roach	Balmain Tigers	Prop	1	0	–	–	–	–
Ian Roberts	Manly-Warringah Sea Eagles	Second-row	4	1	–	–	–	4
Craig Salvatori	Eastern Suburbs Roosters	Second-row	1	–	–	–	–	–
Geoff Toovey	Manly-Warringah Sea Eagles	Halfback	5	2	1	–	–	4
Kerrod Walters	Brisbane Broncos	Hooker	4	2	–	–	–	–
Kevin Walters	Brisbane Broncos	Hooker, Halfback	5	2	1	–	–	4
Rod Wishart	Illawarra Steelers	Wing	4	2	4	4	–	24

== Tour ==
The Australian's played five games on the tour, winning all five.

Sunday, 29 September

Northern Zone	6 – 40	Australia
Tries: Goals: David Buko (3)		Tries: Bradley Clyde (2), Gary Belcher, Scott Gourley, Cliff Lyons, Mal Meninga, Geoff Toovey, Kevin Walters; Goals: Mal Meninga (4/8)

Attendance: 10,300
Referee: Tom Pelas

Northern Zone: David Buko, Tweedy Malagian, Charlie Vee, John Markham, Lance Tirava, Elison Ketauwo, David Gilpu, Mathias Kin, Michael Matmillo, Patrick Kiap, Nande Yer, John Piel (c), Goro Arigae. Res - Joe Tonar, Chris Sari, Jacob Danny, Dick Moiga.

Australia: Gary Belcher, Willie Carne, Mal Meninga (c), Andrew Ettingshausen, Rod Wishart, Peter Jackson, Geoff Toovey, Martin Bella, Kevin Walters, Glenn Lazarus, Craig Salvatori, Ian Roberts, Bradley Clyde. Res - Cliff Lyons, Brad Fittler, Chris Johns, Scott Gourley.

Australian forward Craig Salvatori suffered an ankle injury during the game and did not play again on tour.

Wednesday, 2 October

Island Zone	25 – 42	Australia
Tries: James Kapia, August Joseph, Jimmy Peter; Goals: Normyle Eremas (3); Field Goals: Bernard Bate		Tries: Brad Fittler (2), Peter Jackson (2), Willie Carne, Scott Gourley, Chris Johns; Goals: Gary Belcher (5)

Attendance: 9,000
Referee: Graham Ainui

Island Zone: Normyle Eremas, Arnold Tivelit, Henry Hairoi, August Joseph, James Kapia, Willie Langer, Billy Kennedy, Pisai Maevo, Bernard Bate, David Gaius, Jimmy Peter, Ben Lakur, Apelis Walia. Res - Phillip Nagatia, Ken Oki, Cliff Rich, Albert Levy.

Australia: Gary Belcher (c), Willie Carne, Peter Jackson, Brad Fittler, Chris Johns, Cliff Lyons, Kevin Walters, Steve Roach, Kerrod Walters, Glenn Lazarus, Gary Coyne, Andrew Gee, Scott Gourley. Res - Geoff Toovey, Martin Bella, Ian Roberts, Andrew Ettingshausen.

=== 1st Test ===
Reserve forward Scott Gourley who had made 5 rugby union test appearances for Australia in 1988 before switching to rugby league with St. George, became Australia's 41st dual-rugby international.

Sunday, 6 October

Papua New Guinea	2 – 58	Australia
Tries: Goals: Ipisa Wanega (1/1)		Tries: Willie Carne (3); Rod Wishart (3); Andrew Ettingshausen (2); Brad Fittler (2); Cliff Lyons; Ian Roberts; Goals: Gary Belcher (5/10); Mal Meninga (0/2)

Danny Leahy Oval, Goroka
Attendance: 13,000
Referee: Dennis Hale (New Zealand)
Player of the Match: Willie Carne

Papua New Guinea	Australia

FB	1	Ipisa Wanega
RW	2	Liprin Palangat
CE	3	Chris Itam
CE	4	Richard Wagambi
LW	5	Korul Sinemau
FE	6	Stanley Haru (c)
HB	7	Sam Karara
PR	8	John Unagi
HK	9	Danny Moi
PR	10	Daroa Ben-Moide
SR	11	Max Tiri
SR	12	Thomas Daki
LK	13	Joe Gispe
Substitutions:
IC	14	Joshua Kouoru
IC	15	Ngala Lapan
IC	16	James Naipao
IC	17	Kes Paglipari
Coach:
(Papua New Guinea) Skerry Palanga

FB	1	Gary Belcher
LW	2	Rod Wishart
CE	3	Mal Meninga (c)
CE	4	Andrew Ettingshausen
RW	5	Willie Carne
FE	6	Cliff Lyons
HB	7	Geoff Toovey
PR	8	Martin Bella
HK	9	Kerrod Walters
PR	10	Glenn Lazarus
SR	11	Bradley Clyde
SR	12	Ian Roberts
LF	13	Brad Fittler
Substitutions:
IC	14	Chris Johns
IC	15	Kevin Walters
IC	16	Gary Coyne
IC	17	Scott Gourley
Coach:
(Australia) Bob Fulton

Wednesday, 9 October

Highlands Zone	3 – 28	Australia
Tries: Goals: Gigmai Ongugo (1); Field Goals: Gigmai Ongugo (1)		Tries: Gary Belcher, Willie Carne, Scott Gourley, Chris Johns, Glenn Lazarus; Goals: Rod Wishart (4)

Rebiamul Oval, Mount Hagen
Attendance: 9,000
Referee: Moses Tolingling

Highlands Zone: John Okul, Francis Abba, David Gomia, Thomas Tumbo, Joe Rema, Dimbi Ongugo, Gigmai Ongugo, Leslie Hoffman, Maima Kawage, Yami Kamisive, Joe Paraka (c), Philip Humar, John Yawing. Res - Michael Angra, Mek Kepo, John Passigan, Michael Kiap.

Australia: Gary Belcher, Willie Carne, Chris Johns, Mark McGaw, Rod Wishart, Cliff Lyons, Geoff Toovey, Glenn Lazarus, Kevin Walters, Gary Coyne, Bruce McGuire, Scott Gourley, Bradley Clyde (c). Res - Kerrod Walters, Martin Bella, Brad Fittler, Peter Jackson.

Australia won a bruising encounter 28–3 over Highlands Zone in Mount Hagan.

=== 2nd Test ===
This test match also doubled as a Group Stage game for the 1989-92 Rugby League World Cup. Gary Belcher, Martin Bella, Cliff Lyons and Gary Coyne all played their last tests for Australia.

Sunday, 13 October

Papua New Guinea	6 – 40	Australia
Tries: Stanley Haru Goals: Phillip Boge (1)		Tries: Willie Carne (3); Gary Belcher; Andrew Ettingshausen; Mal Meninga; Peter Jackson; Rod Wishart; Bradley Clyde; Goals: Mal Meninga (2/7); Gary Belcher (0/2)

Lloyd Robson Oval, Port Moresby
Attendance: 14,500
Referee: Dennis Hale (New Zealand)
Player of the Match: Willie Carne

Papua New Guinea	Australia

FB	1	Phillip Boge
RW	2	Liprin Palangat
CE	3	Korul Sinemau
CE	4	Richard Wagambi
LW	5	Gideon Kouoru
FE	6	Stanley Haru (c)
HB	7	Sam Karara
PR	8	John Unagi
HK	9	Danny Moi
PR	10	James Naipao
SR	11	Thomas Daki
SR	12	Kes Paglipari
LK	13	Joe Gispe
Substitutions:
IC	14	Leslie Hoffman
IC	15	Ngala Lapan
IC	16	Kera Ngaffin
IC	17	Jack Uradok
Coach:
(Papua New Guinea) Skerry Palanga

FB	1	Gary Belcher
LW	2	Rod Wishart
CE	3	Mal Meninga (c)
CE	4	Andrew Ettingshausen
RW	5	Willie Carne
FE	6	Peter Jackson
HB	7	Geoff Toovey
PR	8	Martin Bella
HK	9	Kerrod Walters
PR	10	Glenn Lazarus
SR	11	Bradley Clyde
SR	12	Ian Roberts
LF	13	Brad Fittler
Substitutions:
IC	14	Cliff Lyons
IC	15	Kevin Walters
IC	16	Chris Johns
IC	17	Gary Coyne
Coach:
(Australia) Bob Fulton

== Statistics ==
Leading Try Scorer

- 8 by Willie Carne

Leading Point Scorer

- 32 by Gary Belcher (3 tries, 10 goals) and Willie Carne (8 tries)

Largest Attendance

- 14,500 - Second test vs Papua New Guinea at Lloyd Robson Oval

Largest non-test Attendance

- 10,300 - Australia vs Northern Zone
