= 1992–93 Rugby League Divisional Premiership =

1992–93 Divisional Premiership Trophy
- Structure: National knockout championship
- Teams: 12
- Winners: Featherstone Rovers
- Runners-up: Workington Town

The 1992–93 Rugby League Divisional Premiership was the seventh end-of-season Rugby League Divisional Premiership competition.

The competition was contested by 12 teams; the top four teams in the second Division and the top eight teams in the third Division. The winners were Featherstone Rovers.

== First round ==
Date	Team one	Score	Team two
18 April 1993	Dewsbury	22–18	Batley
18 April 1993	Keighley Cougars	34–6	Hunslet
18 April 1993	Ryedale-York	31–6	Whitehaven
18 April 1993	Workington Town	44–14	Doncaster

== Second round ==
Date	Team one	Score	Team two
25 April 1993	Featherstone Rovers	46–8	Ryedale-York
25 April 1993	Huddersfield	10–24	Workington Town
25 April 1993	Oldham	14–14	Dewsbury
25 April 1993	Rochdale Hornets	26–18	Keighley Cougars

=== Replay ===
Date	Team one	Score	Team two
28 April 1993	Dewsbury	20–18	Oldham

== Semi-finals ==
Date	Team one	Score	Team two
9 May 1993	Featherstone Rovers	35–12	Dewsbury
9 May 1993	Rochdale Hornets	16–30	Workington Town

== Final ==
16 May 1993

Featherstone Rovers	20 – 16	Workington Town
Tries: Newlove (2), Maloney; Goals: Pearson (4)		Tries: McKenzie, Oglanby; Goals: Marwood (4)

Old Trafford, Manchester
Referee: John Connolly (Wigan)
Player of the Match: Paul Newlove

1	Martin Pearson
2	Ikram Butt
3	Terry Manning
4	Paul Newlove
5	Owen Simpson
6	Francis Maloney
7	Brett Daunt
8	Leo Casey
9	Mark Wilson (c)
10	Wayne Taekata
11	Gary Price
12	Ian Smales
13	Brendan Tuuta
Substitutes:
14	Neil Roebuck
15	Richard Gunn
Coach:
Steve Martin

1	Mark Mulligan
2	Des Drummond
3	Tony Kay
4	Brad Hepi
5	Garry Smith
6	Ged Byrne
7	Dean Marwood
8	James Pickering
9	Phil McKenzie
10	Peter Riley
11	Ian Scott
12	Colin Armstrong (c)
13	Wayne Kitchin
Substitutes:
14	Gary Schubert
15	Martin Oglanby
Coach:
Peter Walsh

== See also ==
- 1992–93 Rugby Football League season
