= 1992–93 Rugby League Premiership =

1993 Premiership
- Structure: National knockout championship
- Winners: St Helens
- Runners-up: Wigan

The 1993 Rugby League Premiership was the 19th end-of-season Rugby League Premiership competition.

The winners were St Helens.

== First round ==
Date	Home team	Score	Away team
23 April 1993	St Helens	34–25	Halifax
25 April 1993	Bradford Northern	6–19	Castleford
25 April 1993	Widnes	10–22	Leeds
25 April 1993	Wigan	40–5	Warrington

== Semi-finals ==
Date	Home team	Score	Away team
7 May 1993	Wigan	25–8	Castleford
9 May 1993	St Helens	15–2	Leeds

== Final ==
16 May 1993

St Helens	10 – 4	Wigan
Tries: Connolly, Loughlin; Drop goals: O'Donnell (2)		Tries: Forshaw

Old Trafford
Attendance: 36,598
Player of the Match: Chris Joynt

1	David Lyon
2	Mike Riley
3	Gary Connolly
4	Paul Loughlin
5	Alan Hunte
6	Tea Ropati
7	Gus O'Donnell
8	Jon Neill
9	Bernard Dwyer
10	George Mann
11	Chris Joynt
12	Sonny Nickle
13	Shane Cooper
Substitutions:
14	Jonathan Griffiths for George Mann
15	unused
Coach:
Mike McClennan

1	Jason Robinson
2	Sam Panapa
3	Frano Botica
4	Andrew Farrar
5	Kelvin Skerrett
6	Paul Atcheson
7	Shaun Edwards
8	Martin Offiah
9	Neil Cowie
10	Mick Cassidy
11	Andy Farrell
12	Martin Dermott
13	Phil Clarke
Substitutions:
14	Ian Gildart for Kelvin Skerrett
15	Mike Forshaw for Mick Cassidy
Coach:
John Monie
