= Roger Simpson =

England international rugby league footballer

Personal information
- Full name: Roger Simpson
- Born: 27 August 1967 (age 58)

Playing information
- Position: Wing
Club
Years	Team	Pld	T	G	FG	P
1985–96	Bradford Northern	279	72	0	0	288
1996–02	Batley Bulldogs	151	55	0	0	220
	Total	430	127	0	0	508
Representative
Years	Team	Pld	T	G	FG	P
1995	England	1	0	0	0	0

Roger Simpson (born 27 August 1967) is an English former professional rugby league footballer. His most common position was on the wing, but he played at most positions across the backs throughout his playing career. He started his career at Bradford Northern in 1985, making over 250 appearances for the club before joining Batley Bulldogs in 1996. He also received one cap for England in 1995.

== Playing career ==
=== Bradford Northern ===
In August 1984, Simpson was signed by Bradford Northern from amateur club Moldgreen on his 17th birthday. He made his senior debut for the club against Featherstone Rovers in September 1985.

Simpson played centre in Bradford Northern's 12–12 draw with Castleford in the 1987 Yorkshire Cup Final during the 1987–88 season at Headingley, Leeds on Saturday 17 October 1987, and played on the wing in the 11–2 victory over Castleford in the replay at Elland Road, Leeds on Saturday 31 October 1987.

He played at centre in the 20–14 victory over Featherstone Rovers in the 1989 Yorkshire Cup Final during the 1989–90 season at Headingley, Leeds on Sunday 5 November 1989.

Simpson played at centre in Bradford Northern's 2–12 defeat by Warrington in the 1990–91 Regal Trophy Final during the 1990–91 season at Headingley, Leeds on Saturday 12 January 1991.

He played on the wing in the 15–8 defeat by Wigan in the 1992–93 Regal Trophy Final during the 1992–93 season at Elland Road, Leeds on Saturday 23 January 1993.

Simpson became the groundsman at Odsal Stadium while playing for Bradford, a job which he continued after ending his playing career.

=== Batley Bulldogs ===
Simpson was signed by Batley Bulldogs in 1996, and made his debut for the club against Whitehaven in March 1996.

He scored the 100th try of his career in the 1998 Trans-Pennine Cup final in a 28–12 win against Oldham.

=== International honours ===
Simpson was selected in the Great Britain squad for the 1990 Lions tour of Papua New Guinea and New Zealand. He played in five non-Test matches for the team during the tour.

Simpson won one cap for England in 1995 while at Bradford Northern, appearing as a substitute against France.

== Personal life ==
Roger Simpson is the father of Jared Simpson, who played rugby league for Huddersfield Giants between 2015 and 2018.
