= Jared Simpson =

English rugby league footballer (born 1996)

Personal information
- Born: 4 January 1996 (age 30) Huddersfield. England
- Height: 5 ft 10 in (177 cm)
- Weight: 11 st 0 lb (70 kg)

Playing information
- Position: Fullback
Club
Years	Team	Pld	T	G	FG	P
2015–18	Huddersfield Giants	13	4	0	0	16
2016(loan)	→ Newcastle Thunder	3	1	0	0	4
2016(loan)	→ Oldham	3	0	0	0	0
2017(loan)	→ Newcastle Thunder	2	0	0	0	0
2018(loan)	→ Dewsbury Rams	4	0	0	0	0
	Total	25	5	0	0	20
- Source: As of 7 October 2018

Jared Simpson (born 4 January 1996) is an English former professional rugby league footballer who played for Huddersfield Giants in the Super League, as a fullback.

== Playing career ==
A product of the club's academy, Simpson made his senior début for the Giants on 7 June 2015 in a home encounter with the Wigan Warriors.

In December 2017 he signed a season-long loan deal with the Dewsbury Rams. He also had a loan spell at Oldham RLFC.

In 2018, he decided to retire from rugby league to pursue a career outside of the sport.

== Personal life ==
Jared Simpson is the son of Roger Simpson, who played rugby league for Bradford Northern and Batley.
