= David Bishop (rugby, born 1960) =

GB & Wales dual-code international rugby footballer

Personal information
- Full name: David Joseph Bishop
- Born: 31 October 1960 (age 66)

Playing information

Rugby union
- Position: Scrum-half
Club
Years	Team	Pld	T	G	FG	P
1980–1981	Ebbw Vale RFC	0	0	0	0	0
1981-88–1996-99	Pontypool RFC	241	171	97	21	981
	Total	241	171	97	21	981
Representative
Years	Team	Pld	T	G	FG	P
1984	Wales	1	1	0	0	5

Rugby league
- Position: Scrum-half
Club
Years	Team	Pld	T	G	FG	P
1988–91	Hull Kingston Rovers	64	24	1	1	99
1993	London Crusaders	1	0	0	0	0
	Total	65	24	1	1	99
Representative
Years	Team	Pld	T	G	FG	P
1990	Great Britain	1	0	0	0	0
1991–92	Wales	4	1	0	0	4

Coaching information
Club
Years	Team	Gms	W	D	L	W%
1996–1999	Pontypool RFC	0	0	0	0

David Joseph Bishop (born 31 October 1960) is a Welsh former dual-code international rugby union and then rugby league footballer.

== Rugby union career ==
Bishop started his career as a youth player at Cardiff, however left the club due to disciplinary issues. From here he went Ebbw Vale, where as a scrum-half, he played for a season, He made his first-class début for Ebbw Vale. After a season, he then joined Pontypool in 1981, but not long after broke his neck. Despite being told he would never play again, he was back playing for Pontypool within a year. He only gained one cap for Wales – against Australia during the 1984 Australia rugby union tour of Britain and Ireland which Wales lost 28–9. Despite the loss Bishop was the only player to score a try against them.

Bishop had played understudy to fellow scrum-half Terry Holmes, and when Holmes switched codes to rugby league in 1985, many expected Bishop to finally be given his chance to play for Wales permanently. However, during a match versus Newbridge, Chris Jarman received a broken jaw in an off-the ball incident. Jarman brought a private prosecution resulting in Bishop being given a suspended jail sentence and an eleven-month ban by the WRU. The Welsh selectors instead picked Robert Jones of Swansea RFC. Bishop however gained his revenge in 1987-88 when Pontypool defeated Swansea at Pontypool Park in the cup, the highlight of the game being Bishop's penalty in the mud to seal the win, following which Bishop wiggled his rear end to the stand—where the Welsh selectors were sitting.

Despite repeatedly putting in outstanding performances for Pontypool, Bishop was never picked for Wales again, though his case was not helped by several of Bishop's antics off the field. The 1987–1988 season was the most successful in the club's history when they lost only two games all season and Bishop formed a potent partnership with Mark Ring.

When rugby union became openly professional in 1995, Bishop returned to Pontypool as player-coach, even though Pontypool had been relegated from the top flight of rugby in Wales in 1995. Two highlights during this period were saving Pontypool from relegation from Division 1 with a victory over UWIC and the 16–15 win over Neath RFC in the Welsh Cup in 1999. Pontypool then played Cardiff in the next round of the cup, where they were heavily defeated, but Bishop faced his old adversary Robert Jones for the last time.

== Rugby league career ==
In 1988, Bishop was lured to rugby league and he signed for Hull Kingston Rovers. He played two successful seasons at Hull KR, and was selected for the 1990 Great Britain Lions tour. He lost his place in the first team after falling out of favour with head coach Roger Millward, and subsequently played for London Crusaders. He also won 4 caps for the Wales rugby league team in 1991 and 1992.
