= Ian Smales =

GB international rugby league footballer

Personal information
- Full name: Ian Smales
- Born: 26 September 1968 (age 57)

Playing information
- Position: Wing, Centre, Stand-off, Second-row, Loose forward
Club
Years	Team	Pld	T	G	FG	P
1987–93	Featherstone Rovers	162	70	23	0	326
1993–97	Castleford Tigers	95	17	0	0	68
1997	Featherstone Rovers	4	0	0	0	0
1998	Hunslet Hawks	26	6	1	0	26
	Total	287	93	24	0	420
Representative
Years	Team	Pld	T	G	FG	P
1991	Yorkshire	1	1	0	0	4
- Father: Tommy Smales

Ian Smales (born 26 September 1968) is an English former professional rugby league footballer who played in the 1980s and 1990s. He played at representative level for Great Britain (non-Test matches), and Yorkshire, and at club level for Featherstone Rovers, Castleford Tigers and Hunslet Hawks, as a wing, centre, stand-off, second-row, or loose forward, consequently he was known as a Utility player.

== Playing career ==
=== Featherstone Rovers ===
A former English Schools international at loose forward, Smales signed for Featherstone Rovers from Lock Lane amateurs in April 1987.

Smales played at stand-off in Featherstone Rovers' 14-20 defeat by Bradford Northern in the 1989 Yorkshire Cup Final during the 1989–90 season at Headingley, Leeds on Sunday 5 November 1989.

Smales played at second-row in Featherstone Rovers' 20-16 victory over Workington Town in the 1992–93 Divisional Premiership Final during the 1992–93 season at Old Trafford, Manchester on Wednesday 19 May 1993.

=== Castleford ===
In 1993, Smales was signed by Castleford for a fee of £115,000.

Smales played right-second-row in Castleford's 33-2 victory over Wigan in the 1993–94 Regal Trophy Final during the 1993–94 at Headingley, Leeds on Saturday 22 January 1994. He made 95 appearances for the club.

He briefly returned to Featherstone in 1997, making four further appearances.

=== Representative honours ===
Smales was selected for Great Britain while at Featherstone Rovers for the 1990 Great Britain Lions tour. He played in seven games during the tour, but was uncapped as he did not appear in any Test matches.

Smales won a cap for Yorkshire while at Featherstone Rovers; during the 1991–92 season against Lancashire.

== Outside of rugby league ==
Ian Smales still attends Featherstone Rovers games, and now works as a Sport & Active Lifestyles’ Health & Fitness Officer, for Wakefield District Council. He is married to Keely Smales, and has a daughter; Alice Smales, and a son; Eli Smales.

== Personal life ==
Ian Smales is the son of the rugby league footballer who played in the 1950s and 1960s, and coached in the 1970s and 1980s; Tommy Smales.
