= 1989–90 Yorkshire Cup =

- Structure: Regional knockout championship
- Teams: 18
- Winners: Bradford Northern
- Runners-up: Featherstone Rovers

The 1989–90 Yorkshire Cup was the eighty-second occasion on which the Yorkshire Cup competition was held. Bradford Northern won the trophy for the second time in three years, this time by beating Featherstone Rovers by the score of 20–14
The match was played at Headingley, Leeds, now in West Yorkshire. The attendance was 12,607 and receipts were £50,775
For the first time, both semi-final matches resulted in draws, both requiring a replay.

== Background ==
This season there were no junior/amateur clubs taking part, no new entrants and no "leavers" and so the total of entries remained the same at eighteen.
This in turn resulted in the necessity to continue with a preliminary round to reduce the number of clubs entering the first round to sixteen.

== Competition and results ==
=== Preliminary round ===
Involved 2 matches and 4 clubs

Game No	Fixture Date	Home team	Score	Away team	Venue	Att	Rec	Notes	Ref
P1	Sun 27 Aug 1989	Dewsbury	18–17	Wakefield Trinity	Crown Flatt	2246			
P2	Sun 27 Aug 1989	Nottingham City	6–56	Hull F.C.	Harvey Hadden Stadium	902		(Note: The first Yorkshire Cup game to be played by Nottingham City, after being re-named from Mansfield Marksmen, and the first at their new stadium)	

=== Round 1 ===
Involved 5 matches (with three byes) and 13 clubs

Game No	Fixture Date	Home team	Score	Away team	Venue	Att	Rec	Notes	Ref
1	Sun 17 Sep 1989	Batley	5–36	Sheffield Eagles	Mount Pleasant	1299			
2	Sun 17 Sep 1989	Bramley	12–54	Hull Kingston Rovers	McLaren Field	1545			
3	Sun 17 Sep 1989	Dewsbury	7–22	Halifax	Crown Flatt	3604			
4	Sun 17 Sep 1989	Doncaster	23–4	Huddersfield	Bentley Road Stadium/Tattersfield	2341			
5	Sun 17 Sep 1989	Featherstone Rovers	86–18	Keighley	Post Office Road	2209		(Note: The second highest score in a Yorkshire Cup match to date)	
6	Sun 17 Sep 1989	Hull F.C.	20–10	Ryedale-York	Boulevard	4317		(Note: The first Yorkshire Cup game to be played by newly re-named Ryedale-York)	
7	Sun 17 Sep 1989	Hunslet	0–44	Castleford	Elland Road	3180			
8	Sun 17 Sep 1989	Leeds	8–15	Bradford Northern	Headingley	13214			

=== Round 2 - Quarter-finals ===
Involved 4 matches and 8 clubs

Game No	Fixture Date	Home team	Score	Away team	Venue	Att	Rec	Notes	Ref
1	Wed 27 Sep 1989	Bradford Northern	19–6	Sheffield Eagles	Odsal	4210			
2	Wed 27 Sep 1989	Castleford	28–12	Hull Kingston Rovers	Wheldon Road	6250			
3	Wed 27 Sep 1989	Featherstone Rovers	37–22	Doncaster	Post Office Road	3526			
4	Wed 27 Sep 1989	Halifax	13–2	Hull F.C.	Thrum Hall	8087			

=== Round 3 – Semi-finals ===
Involved 2 matches and 4 clubs

Game No	Fixture Date	Home team	Score	Away team	Venue	Att	Rec	Notes	Ref
1	Thu 5 Oct 1989	Halifax	16–16	Bradford Northern	Thrum Hall	9454			
2	Thu 12 Oct 1989	Featherstone Rovers	18–18	Castleford	Post Office Road	6227			

=== Semi-final - replays ===
Involved 1 match and 2 clubs

Game No	Fixture Date	Home team	Score	Away team	Venue	Att	Rec	Notes	Ref
R1	Sun 15 Oct 1989	Bradford Northern	26–4	Halifax	Odsal	12748			
R2	Sun 22 Oct 1989	Castleford	26–28	Featherstone Rovers	Wheldon Road	9065			

=== Final ===
Game No	Fixture Date	Home team	Score	Away team	Venue	Att	Rec	Notes	Ref
	Sunday 5 November 1989	Bradford Northern	20–14	Featherstone Rovers	Headingley	12,607	£50,775	(Note: Headingley, Leeds, is the home ground of Leeds RLFC with a capacity of 21,000. The record attendance was 40,175 for a league match between Leeds and Bradford Northern on 21 May 1947.)	

==== Teams and scorers ====
Bradford Northern	№	Featherstone Rovers
	teams	
Ian Wilkinson	1	Chris Bibb
Gerry Cordle	2	Barry Drummond
Steve McGowan	3	Iva Ropati
Roger Simpson	4	Paul Newlove
Richard Francis	5	Alan Banks
Ivan Henjak	6	Ian Smales
Paul Harkin	7	Deryck Fox (c)
Kelvin Skerrett	8	Jeff Grayshon
Glenn Barraclough	9	Trevor Clark
Jon Hamer	10	Glenn Bell
David Hobbs (c)	11	Gary Price
Karl Fairbank	12	Glen Booth
John Pendlebury	13	Peter Smith
Keith Mumby (for Ivan Henjak 13m)	14	Alan Dakin (for Glenn Bell 51m)
Paul Medley (for Jon Hamer 9m)	15	Andy Fisher (for Glen Booth 51m)
Ron Willey	Coach	Peter Fox
20	score	14
12	HT	10
	Scorers	
	Tries	
Gerry Cordle (2)	T	Iva Ropati (1)
Paul Harkin (2)	T	Peter Smith (1)
	Goals	
David Hobbs (2)	G	Deryck Fox (3)
Referee		Robin Whitfield (Widnes)
White Rose Trophy for Man of the match		Paul Harkin - Bradford Northern - scrum-half
sponsored by		
Competition Sponsor		John Smith's Brewery Tadcaster

Scoring - Try = four points - Goal = two points - Drop goal = one point

=== The road to success ===
The following chart excludes any preliminary round fixtures/results

First round
Dewsbury	7
Halifax	22
Hull F.C.	20
Ryedale-York	10
Leeds	8
Bradford Northern	15
Batley	5
Sheffield Eagles	36
Featherstone Rovers	86
Keighley	16
Doncaster	23
Huddersfield	4
Hunslet	0
Castleford	44
Bramley	12
Hull Kingston Rovers	54

Second round
Halifax	13
Hull F.C.	2
Bradford Northern	19
Sheffield Eagles	6
Featherstone Rovers	37
Doncaster	22
Castleford	28
Hull Kingston Rovers	12

Semi-finals
Halifax	16 (4)
Bradford Northern	16 (26)
Featherstone Rovers	18 (28)
Castleford	18 (26)

Final
Bradford Northern	20
Featherstone Rovers	14

== See also ==
- 1989–90 Rugby Football League season
- Rugby league county cups
