= Geoff Lyon =

English rugby league footballer and coach

Personal information
- Full name: Geoffrey Lyon
- Born: c. 1940 England
- Died: 9 November 2004 (aged 64) Wigan, England

Playing information
- Position: Second-row
Club
Years	Team	Pld	T	G	FG	P
1959–69	Wigan	302+26	73	0	0	219
1969–70	Leigh	36	6	0	0	18
	Total	364	79	0	0	237
Representative
Years	Team	Pld	T	G	FG	P
1968	Lancashire	1	0	0	0	0

Coaching information
Club
Years	Team	Gms	W	D	L	W%
1980–81	Blackpool Borough	32	5	1	26	16

Geoff Lyon (c. 1940 – 9 November 2004) was an English professional rugby league footballer who played as a second-row for Wigan and Leigh, and made one representative appearance for Lancashire. His son, David Lyon was also a professional rugby league footballer.

== Playing career ==
=== Challenge Cup Final appearances ===
Geoff Lyon was an unused substitute in Wigan's 20-16 victory over Hunslet in the 1965 Challenge Cup Final during the 1964–65 season at Wembley Stadium, London on Saturday 8 May 1965, in front of a crowd of 89,016.

=== County Cup Final appearances ===
Geoff Lyon was a substitute in Wigan's 7-4 victory over St. Helens in the 1968 BBC2 Floodlit Trophy Final during the 1968–69 season at Central Park, Wigan on Tuesday 17 December 1968, played at second-row in Wigan's 16-13 victory over Oldham in the 1966 Lancashire Cup Final during the 1966–67 season at Station Road, Swinton on Saturday 29 October 1966, and played at second-row in Leigh's 2-11 defeat by Swinton in the 1969 Lancashire Cup Final during the 1969–70 season at Central Park, Wigan on Saturday 1 November 1969.

=== BBC2 Floodlit Trophy Final appearances ===
Geoff Lyon played loose forward in Leigh's 11-6 victory over Wigan in the 1969 BBC2 Floodlit Trophy Final during the 1969–70 season at Central Park, Wigan on Tuesday 16 December 1969.
