= Brad Dwyer =

English rugby league footballer (born 1993)

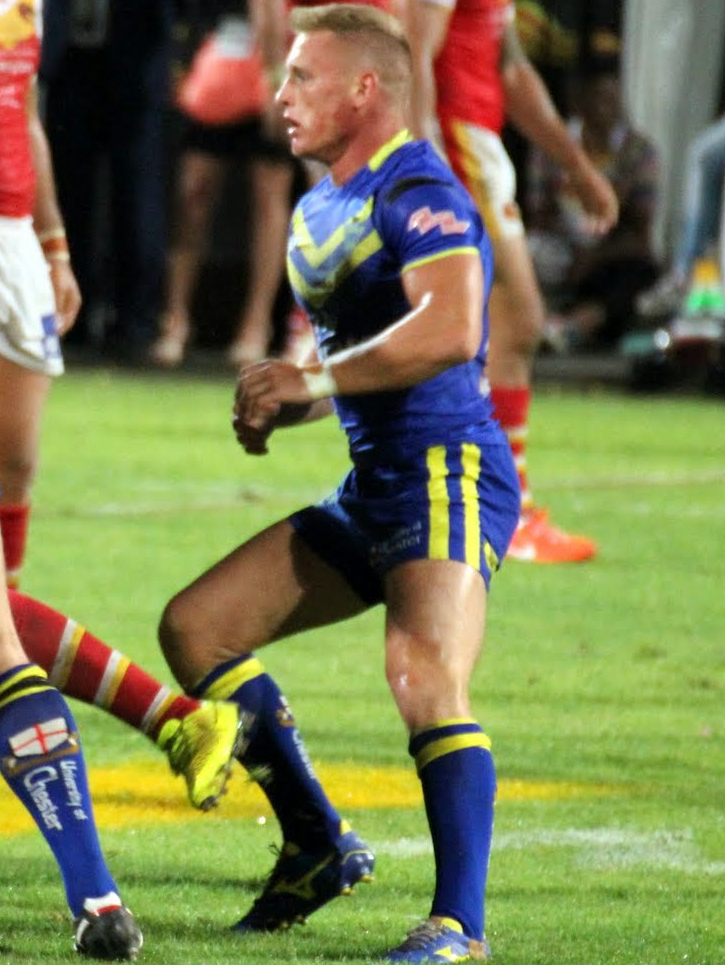

Personal information
- Full name: Bradley Dwyer
- Born: 28 April 1993 (age 33) Wigan, Greater Manchester, England
- Height: 5 ft 8 in (1.73 m)
- Weight: 13 st 12 lb (88 kg)

Playing information
- Position: Hooker
Club
Years	Team	Pld	T	G	FG	P
2012–17	Warrington Wolves	88	16	0	0	64
2013(loan)	→ Swinton Lions	8	2	0	0	8
2013(loan)	→ Huddersfield Giants	6	0	0	0	0
2014(loan)	→ Swinton Lions	11	6	0	0	24
2015(loan)	→ London Broncos	12	4	0	0	16
2018–22	Leeds Rhinos	121	35	0	1	141
2018(loan)	→ Featherstone Rovers	3	6	0	0	24
2023	Hull FC	26	2	0	0	8
2024	Warrington Wolves	0	0	0	0	0
2024(loan)	→ Leigh Leopards	5	0	0	0	0
2024–25	Leigh Leopards	22	3	0	0	12
2025(loan)	→ Salford Red Devils	1	1	0	0	4
2026–	Salford	11	6	0	0	24
2026(loan)	→ Castleford Tigers	2	1	0	0	4
	Total	316	82	0	1	329
- Source: As of 20 November 2026
- Relatives: Taylor Kerr (cousin)

Brad Dwyer (born 28 April 1993) is an English rugby league footballer who plays as a hooker for Salford RLFC in the RFL Championship.

He previously played for Leeds Rhinos and Hull FC in the Super League, playing on loan from Warrington at the Swinton Lions and the London Broncos in the Championship, and the Huddersfield Giants in the Super League. He has also spent time on loan from Leeds at Featherstone Rovers in the Championship.

== Background ==
Dwyer was born in Wigan, Greater Manchester, England. His cousin Taylor Kerr is a fellow professional rugby league footballer.

He played cricket in his junior years at Springview C.C and was famous for his use of a very heavy bat and aggressive batting style opening the batting on a regular basis for their 2nd Eleven .

== Career ==
=== Warrington Wolves ===
Dwyer made his first team début for the Warrington side in March 2012 and scored his first Super League try in a local derby against Widnes a month later.

For the 2013 season he was one of six Warrington players to sign for Championship club Swinton under the dual registration rules.

On 7 May 2014, he signed a new deal that would keep him at the Warrington outfit until November 2016.

He played in the 2016 Challenge Cup Final defeat by Hull F.C. at Wembley Stadium.

=== Leeds Rhinos ===
In July 2017, he signed a two-year deal to play for Leeds club from the start of the 2018 season.

The Featherstone Rovers most tries in a match record of six tries is jointly held by; Chris Bibb, Dwyer, and Michael Smith, Dwyer scored six tries against Rochdale on Sunday 1 July 2018.

On 17 October 2020, he played in the 2020 Challenge Cup Final victory for Leeds over Salford at Wembley Stadium.

=== Hull F.C. ===
After 120 appearances for Leeds, Dwyer signed for Hull F.C. ahead of the 2023 Super League season. Dwyer played 24 matches for Hull F.C. in the Super League XXVIII season as the club finished 10th on the table.

=== Warrington Wolves (rejoin) ===
On 24 October 2023, it was reported that he had re-joined Warrington on a two-year deal With his loan and then permanent move to Leigh in April 2024, Dwyer did not make a competitive start for Warrington.

=== Leigh Leopards ===
On 26 February 2024 it was reported that he had signed for Leigh on a two-week short-term loan, following the injury to Edwin Ipape. Dwyer made his debut for Leigh in their 12-4 loss to St Helens. Dwyer was sent to the sin bin during the second half for a professional foul. On 11 April 2024, Dwyer signed a two-year deal to join Leigh permanently.

=== Salford Red Devils (loan) ===
On 9 August 2025 it was reported that he had signed for Salford Red Devils in the Super League on loan

=== Salford RLFC ===
On 15 January 2026 it was reported that he had signed for Salford RLFC in the RFL Championship

=== Castleford Tigers (loan) ===
On 28 April 2026 it was reported that he had signed for Castleford Tigers in the Super League on one-week loan

On 19 May 2026 it was confirmed that his loan period had ended and that he had returned to Salford RLFC
