= David Lyon (rugby) =

Former GB international rugby league footballer

Personal information
- Born: 3 September 1965 (age 59); Wigan, England

Playing information

Rugby league
- Position: Fullback
Club
Years	Team	Pld	T	G	FG	P
1983–87	Widnes	26+14	2	0	0	8
1987–92	Warrington	144+3	31	112	1	349
1992–96	St. Helens	64+2	26	20	1	145
1995(loan)	→ Sheffield Eagles	3+1	0	0	0	0
1996(loan)	→ Leigh RLFC	12+1	8	0	0	32
	Total	270	67	132	2	534
Representative
Years	Team	Pld	T	G	FG	P
1985–86	Great Britain U-21	2	0	0	0	0
1991	Lancashire	1	0	0	0	0

Rugby union
- Position: Centre
Club
Years	Team	Pld	T	G	FG	P
1996–99	Orrell	52	13	0	0	65

David Lyon (born 3 September 1965) is an English former professional rugby league and rugby union footballer who played as a fullback for Widnes, Warrington, St Helens, Sheffield Eagles and the Leigh Centurions. He switched to rugby union in 1996 and finished his playing career with Orrell.

He is the son of Geoff Lyon the former Wigan RLFC great who played at Wigan from 1959 to 1969.

== Playing career ==
=== Widnes ===
Lyon started his professional rugby league career with Widnes, joining the club from amateur side Wigan St Patricks in September 1983. He made his debut for the club on Boxing Day in 1983, starting at fullback in place of the injured Mick Burke.

=== Warrington ===
Lyon signed for Warrington in August 1987. The transfer fee was set at £12,500 by an independent tribunal after the two clubs failed to agree a fee.

Lyon played fullback (replaced by interchange/substitute Paul Darbyshire on 34-minutes) in Warrington's 24–16 victory over Oldham in the 1989 Lancashire Cup Final during the 1989–90 season at Knowsley Road, St. Helens on Saturday 14 October 1989. He also played and scored a try in Warrington's 14–36 defeat by Wigan in the 1990 Challenge Cup Final at Wembley Stadium, London on Saturday 28 April 1990, in front of a crowd of 77,729.

Lyon played fullback, and scored four conversions in Warrington's 12–2 victory over Bradford Northern in the 1990–91 Regal Trophy Final during the 1990–91 season at Headingley, Leeds on Saturday 12 January 1991.

=== St Helens ===
In September 1992, Lyon was signed by St Helens for an estimated fee of £90,000.

Lyon played fullback in St Helens' 10–4 victory over Wigan in the 1992–93 Premiership Final during the 1992–93 season at Old Trafford, Manchester on Sunday 16 May 1993.

=== Representative career ===
Lyon was selected for the 1990 Great Britain Lions tour to Papua New Guinea and New Zealand. He also represented Lancashire in the 1991 War of the Roses.

=== Rugby union ===
Lyon switched to rugby union in 1996 when the game went professional playing for Orrell as a centre until 1999. He Captained the side in the first year of the professional premiership and lead them to Lancashire Cup glory. He was selected to play for The North of England v NZ All Blacks.

== Coaching career ==
Once his playing days were over David went into coaching and was Head junior coach at both St Helens and Wigan Warriors. He was assistant coach to his ex teammate Mike Gregory in 2002 when they created history by coaching England Academy to the first ever victory over Australian Schoolboys on British soil. He then took over as Head coach of England Academy in 2004 and lead them to create more history on the tour to NZ and Australia by beating Australian Schoolboys for the first time ever on Australian soil.

David then joined Brian Noble as his assistant coach to Great Britain Rugby League and was part of the 2006 Tri Nations in Australia and NZ where Great Britain beat Australia for the first time in 30 years in Sydney, Australia.

He is currently the assistant director for Environment and Housing at Wigan Council.
