= 1989–1992 Rugby League World Cup =

International Rugby League tournament

- Number of teams: 5
- Winner: Australia (7th title)
- Matches played: 21
- Attendance: 300,059 (14,289 per match)
- Points scored: 834 (39.71 per match)
- Top scorer: (Australia) Mal Meninga (70)
- Top try scorer: (Australia) Mal Meninga (7)

The 1989–1992 Rugby League World Cup (sometimes shortened to 1992 Rugby League World Cup) was the tenth staging of the Rugby League World Cup, and continued to use the three-year format, stretching across the years 1989 to 1992. As with the 1985–1988 World Cup, teams played each other on a home-and-away basis. These matches were fitted into the normal international programme of three-match test series between the nations, with a pre-designated match from each series counting as the World Cup fixture. The tournament culminated in the 1992 Rugby League World Cup final.

The matches went strictly to form, with Australia undefeated and certain to claim a world cup final berth as early as 1991. France and Papua New Guinea were uncompetitive, leading to a straight fight between New Zealand and Great Britain for the right to meet the Kangaroos in the final. In the event the Lions were able to just edge out the Kiwis on points difference.

As they had done in 1988, Australia had won the right to host the World Cup final. However, with the potential for a much larger attendance, the Australian Rugby League agreed to allow Great Britain to host the game at the 82,000 capacity Wembley Stadium in London. The final was a surprisingly close affair, with Great Britain leading with only 12 minutes to go. The game's only try was then scored by centre Steve Renouf in his international debut for the Kangaroos and Australia were able to claim their fourth consecutive World Cup title before a world record international rugby league attendance of 73,631.

== Venues ==
(Australia) Brisbane	(England) Leeds	(New Zealand) Auckland	(England) Wigan
Lang Park	Elland Road	Mount Smart Stadium	Central Park
Capacity: 32,500	Capacity: 32,500	Capacity: 30,000	Capacity: 30,000
(New Zealand) Christchurch	(New Zealand) Christchurch	(Papua New Guinea) Port Moresby	(England) Hull
Queen Elizabeth II Park	Addington Showgrounds	Lloyd Robson Oval	The Boulevard
Capacity: 25,000	Capacity: 18,000	Capacity: 17,000	Capacity: 16,000
(France) Perpignan	(Australia) Parkes	(Papua New Guinea) Goroka	(Australia) Townsville
Stade Gilbert Brutus	Pioneer Oval	Danny Leahy Oval	Townsville Sports Reserve
Capacity: 13,000	Capacity: 12,000	Capacity: 12,000	Capacity: 12,000
(France) Carcassonne			
Stade Albert Domec			
Capacity: 10,000			

=== Final ===
The World Cup final was played at Wembley Stadium in London.

(England) London
Wembley Stadium
Capacity: 82,000
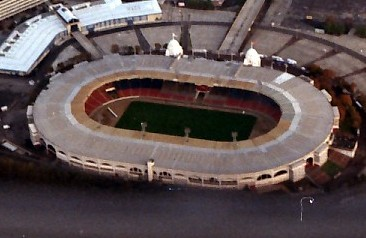

== Matches ==
=== Group stage ===
Team	Pld	W	D	L	PF	PA	PD	Pts	Qualification
Australia	8	8	0	0	236	68	+168	16	Advances to the Final
Great Britain	8	5	0	3	215	79	+136	10	Advances to the Final
New Zealand	8	5	0	3	203	120	+83	10	
France	8	2	0	6	80	247	−167	4	
Papua New Guinea	8	0	0	8	84	304	−220	0	

Source: RLWC2013

==== 1989 ====
23 July 1989

New Zealand	14–22	Australia

Mount Smart Stadium, Auckland
Attendance: 15,000

The first match of the 1989–1992 World Cup was also the 3rd test of the 1989 Trans-Tasman Test series which was won 3–0 by Australia

11 November 1989

Great Britain	10–6	New Zealand

Central Park, Wigan
Attendance: 20,346

3 December 1989

France	0–34	New Zealand

Stade d'Albert Domec, Carcassonne
Attendance: 4,208

==== 1990 ====
2 June 1990

Papua New Guinea	8–40	Great Britain

Lloyd Robson Oval, Port Moresby
Attendance: 7,837

27 June 1990

Australia	34–2	France

Pioneer Oval, Parkes, New South Wales
Attendance: 12,384

15 July 1990

New Zealand	21–18	Great Britain

Queen Elizabeth II Park, Christchurch
Attendance: 3,133

11 August 1990

Papua New Guinea	10–18	New Zealand

Lloyd Robson Oval, Port Moresby
Attendance: 7,837

24 November 1990

Great Britain	0–14	Australia

Elland Road, Leeds
Attendance: 32,500

This match was also the 3rd and deciding test of the 1990 Ashes series.

9 December 1990

France	10–34	Australia

Stade Gilbert Brutus, Perpignan
Attendance: 3,428

==== 1991 ====
27 January 1991

France	10–45	Great Britain

Stade Gilbert Brutus, Perpignan
Attendance: 3,965

23 June 1991

New Zealand	32–10	France

Addington Showground, Christchurch
Attendance: 2,000

7 July 1991

Papua New Guinea	18–20	France

Danny Leahy Oval, Goroka
Attendance: 11,485

31 July 1991

Australia	40–12	New Zealand

Lang Park, Brisbane
Attendance: 29,139

This match was also the 3rd and deciding test of the 1991 Trans-Tasman series.

13 October 1991

Papua New Guinea	6–40	Australia

Lloyd Robson Oval, Port Moresby
Attendance: 14,500

Australian winger Willie Carne crossed for a hat trick of tries in Port Moresby.

9 November 1991

Great Britain	56–4	Papua New Guinea

Central Park, Wigan
Attendance: 4,193

24 November 1991

France	28–14	Papua New Guinea

Stade d'Albert Domec, Carcassonne
Attendance: 1,440

==== 1992 ====
7 March 1992

Great Britain	36–0	France

The Boulevard, Kingston-upon-Hull
Attendance: 5,250

3 July 1992

Australia	16–10	Great Britain
Tries: Daley; Meninga; Goals: Meninga (4)		Tries: Offiah; Goals: Eastwood (3)

Lang Park, Brisbane
Attendance: 32,313
Player of the Match: Paul Sironen (Australia)

In addition to being an allocated World Cup match, this was the third, deciding test of the 1992 Ashes series. This six-point margin of defeat meant that New Zealand would need to beat Papua New Guinea by 109 points in the following match to prevent a Great Britain-Australia World Cup final in October.

5 July 1992

New Zealand	66–10	Papua New Guinea

Mount Smart Stadium, Auckland
Attendance: 3,000

15 July 1992

Australia	36–14	Papua New Guinea

Townsville Sports Reserve, Queensland
Attendance: 12,470

=== Final ===
24 October 1992
2:30PM (BST)

Great Britain	6–10	Australia
Tries: Goals: Deryck Fox (3/4)		Tries: Steve Renouf; Goals: Mal Meninga (3/4)

Wembley Stadium, London
Attendance: 73,631
Referee: Dennis Hale (New Zealand)
Player of the Match: Steve Walters

Great Britain	Australia

FB	1	Joe Lydon
RW	2	Alan Hunte
RC	3	Gary Connolly
LC	4	Garry Schofield (c)
LW	5	Martin Offiah
SO	6	Shaun Edwards
SH	7	Deryck Fox
PR	8	Kevin Ward
HK	9	Martin Dermott
PR	10	Andy Platt
SR	11	Denis Betts
SR	12	Phil Clarke
LK	13	Ellery Hanley
Substitutions:
IC	14	John Devereux
IC	15	Alan Tait
IC	16	Kelvin Skerrett
IC	17	Richard Eyres
Coach:
(England) Mal Reilly

FB	1	Tim Brasher
RW	2	Willie Carne
RC	3	Steve Renouf
LC	4	Mal Meninga (c)
LW	5	Michael Hancock
FE	6	Brad Fittler
HB	7	Allan Langer
PR	8	Glenn Lazarus
HK	9	Steve Walters
PR	10	Mark Sargent
SR	11	Paul Sironen
SR	12	Bob Lindner
LF	13	Bradley Clyde
Substitutions:
IC	14	David Gillespie
IC	15	Kevin Walters
IC	16	John Cartwright
IC	17	Chris Johns
Coach:
(Australia) Bob Fulton

This match set a new world record attendance for a rugby league international of 73,631, beating the previous record of 70,204 set at the Sydney Cricket Ground during the 1932 Ashes series. As they had done in 1988, Australia won the right to host the World Cup final. However, in the interests of rugby league, and the potential for a much larger attendance since at the time Lang Park in Brisbane could only hold 33,000, and the Sydney Football Stadium could only seat 42,000, the ARL agreed to Great Britain hosting the final at the 82,000 capacity Wembley.

Unlike 1988 when Australia had agreed to let New Zealand host the Final at Eden Park in Auckland due to dwindling international attendances in Australia, the international game had become popular again over the next four years (mainly due to much improved performances by Great Britain and New Zealand) and there was a good chance of sell-out crowd in either Brisbane or Sydney for the game. However, the potential for an attendance at Wembley that would be almost or more than double the size that could be seen in Australia, and the potential exposure from playing the game at one of the world's most iconic stadiums, could not be ignored.

Both coaches picked experienced teams, with only Australian's Tim Brasher (fullback) and Steve Renouf (centre) making their international debut in the game. With incumbent fullback Andrew Ettingshausen unavailable through injury, Australian coach Bob Fulton preferred utility outside back Brasher over Newcastle Knights fullback Brad Godden due to Brasher's previous big game experience having played in Balmain's 1989 Grand Final loss as well as making his State of Origin debut earlier in the year. Fulton also chose seven members from the Brisbane Broncos 1992 Winfield Cup premiership winning team including exciting centre Renouf. Lions coach Mal Reilly chose to retain Garry Schofield as captain despite the presence of Ellery Hanley in the team. He also went with pace on the wings with Martin Offiah and St. Helens flyer Alan Hunte.

The hard-fought final was a one-try affair, with Great Britain leading 6–4 with only 12 minutes remaining. The only try of the match was then set up by Australian replacement back Kevin Walters, who, with a clever cut-out pass, put his Broncos teammate Steve Renouf into a gap not covered by replacement Lions centre John Devereux. Renouf, in his debut test for Australia, then raced 20 metres to score in the corner. Otherwise, the two teams' kickers (Mal Meninga and Deryck Fox) were called upon to score most of the points, including Meninga's pressure sideline conversion of Renouf's try. The rain started pouring in the second half and Australia was able to hold Great Britain out and maintain their lead until the final siren.

Australia's triumph saw them win their fourth World Cup in a row after winning the previous cups in 1975, 1977 and 1988. It also ended a mini-hoodoo for the Kangaroos at London's Wembley Stadium. Australia had previously left the arena 21–12 losers in 1973, and the 1990 Kangaroos were outplayed by Great Britain 19–12, but when it mattered most this time around Australia proved themselves as worthy World Cup champions.

The match was telecast live late at night throughout Australia on the Nine Network, with commentary provided by Ray Warren, Peter Sterling and Paul Vautin, with sideline comments from Chris Bombolas. The game broke Australia's midnight-to-dawn television ratings record which was set a year earlier by the rugby union's 1991 Rugby World Cup final.

== Try scorers ==
7

- (Australia) Mal Meninga

5

- (Australia) Willie Carne
- (Australia) Brad Mackay
- (United Kingdom) Martin Offiah
- (United Kingdom) Garry Schofield
- (New Zealand) Richie Blackmore
- (New Zealand) Dave Watson

4

- (Australia) Laurie Daley
- (Australia) Andrew Ettingshausen

3

- (Australia) Bradley Clyde
- (Australia) Dale Shearer
- (New Zealand) Tony Kemp

2

- (Australia) Graham Mackay
- (Australia) Mark McGaw
- (Australia) Rod Wishart
- (France) Jean-Marc Garcia
- (France) Cyril Pons
- (United Kingdom) Denis Betts
- (United Kingdom) Paul Eastwood
- (United Kingdom) Shaun Edwards
- (United Kingdom) Carl Gibson
- (United Kingdom) Michael Jackson
- (United Kingdom) Paul Moriarty
- (United Kingdom) Andy Platt
- (United Kingdom) Daryl Powell
- (New Zealand) Dean Clark
- (New Zealand) Sam Panapa
- (New Zealand) Kelly Shelford
- (Papua New Guinea) Stanley Haru
- (Papua New Guinea) Jack Uradok

1

- (Australia) Greg Alexander
- (Australia) Gary Belcher
- (Australia) Ben Elias
- (Australia) Brad Fittler
- (Australia) Peter Jackson
- (Australia) Chris Johns
- (Australia) Michael O'Connor
- (Australia) Steve Renouf
- (Australia) Steve Roach
- (Australia) Mark Sargent
- (Australia) Steve Walters
- (France) Christophe Auroy
- (France) Denis Biénès
- (France) Christophe Bonnafous
- (France) Patrick Entat
- (France) David Despin
- (France) Daniel Divet
- (France) Gilles Dumas
- (France) David Fraisse
- (France) Daniel Verdès
- (United Kingdom) Martin Dermott
- (United Kingdom) Paul Dixon
- (United Kingdom) Karl Fairbank
- (United Kingdom) Deryck Fox
- (United Kingdom) Bobbie Goulding
- (United Kingdom) Les Holliday
- (United Kingdom) Alan Hunte
- (United Kingdom) Paul Newlove
- (United Kingdom) Roy Powell
- (United Kingdom) Anthony Sullivan
- (United Kingdom) Alan Tait
- (New Zealand) Dean Bell
- (New Zealand) Mark Elia
- (New Zealand) Gary Freeman
- (New Zealand) Clayton Friend
- (New Zealand) Gavin Hill
- (New Zealand) Sean Hoppe
- (New Zealand) Kevin Iro
- (New Zealand) Mike Kuiti
- (New Zealand) Dean Lonergan
- (New Zealand) Duane Mann
- (New Zealand) Jarrod McCracken
- (New Zealand) Gary Mercer
- (New Zealand) Tawera Nikau
- (New Zealand) Matthew Ridge
- (New Zealand) Brent Stuart
- (New Zealand) Darrell Williams
- (Papua New Guinea) Sauna Babago
- (Papua New Guinea) Aquila Emil
- (Papua New Guinea) Paul Gela
- (Papua New Guinea) Chris Itam
- (Papua New Guinea) August Joseph
- (Papua New Guinea) James Naipo
- (Papua New Guinea) Gigmai Ongugo
- (Papua New Guinea) Opoe Soga
- (Papua New Guinea) Goie Waine
