= Wayne Taekata =

Australian rugby league footballer

Personal information
- Full name: Wayne Taekata
- Born: 19 June 1967 (age 59)

Playing information
- Position: Prop
Club
Years	Team	Pld	T	G	FG	P
1989	North Sydney	1	0	0	0	0
1992	Western Suburbs	4	0	0	0	0
1992–93	Featherstone Rovers	31	0	0	0	0
	Total	36	0	0	0	0

Wayne Taekata (born 19 June 1967) is an Australian former professional rugby league footballer who played in the 1980s and 1990s. He played for Western Suburbs and the North Sydney Bears in the NSWRL competition.

== Playing career ==
Taekata made his first grade debut for North Sydney in round 21 of the 1989 NSWRL season against Newcastle. Taekata played off the interchange bench in the clubs 14-1 loss at North Sydney Oval. In the 1992 NSWRL season, Taekata played four games for Western Suburbs. In 1993, Taekata played Group 9 Rugby League with the Turvey Park Lions with the side winning a premiership in that season. Taekata then went on to captain-coach the Coffs Harbour Comets in the late 1990s.
