= Shaun Irwin =

GB international rugby league footballer

Personal information
- Full name: Shaun Michael Irwin
- Born: 8 December 1968 (age 57) Pontefract, England

Playing information
- Position: Centre, Second-row
Club
Years	Team	Pld	T	G	FG	P
1986–93	Castleford	141	41	0	0	154
1993–96	Oldham Bears	51	15	0	0	60
1998	Featherstone Rovers
	Total	192	56	0	0	214
Representative
Years	Team	Pld	T	G	FG	P
1988–90	Great Britain U21	4
1990	Great Britain	4	0	0	0	0

Shaun Irwin (born 8 December 1968) is an English former professional rugby league footballer who played in the 1980s and 1990s. He played at representative level for Great Britain, and at club level for Castleford, Oldham Bears and Featherstone Rovers (captain), as a centre or second-row.

== Background ==
Shaun Irwin was born in Pontefract, West Riding of Yorkshire, England.

== Playing career ==
=== International honors ===
Irwin represented Great Britain under-21s four times between 1988 and 1990.

Irwin won caps for Great Britain while at Castleford in 1990 against France, Papua New Guinea, and New Zealand, and in 1990 in the 1989–1992 Rugby League World Cup against New Zealand.

=== First Division Grand Final appearances ===
Shaun Irwin played at centre in Featherstone Rovers' 22-24 defeat by Wakefield Trinity in the 1998 First Division Grand Final at McAlpine Stadium, Huddersfield on 26 September 1998.

=== County Cup Final appearances ===
Shaun Irwin played at centre in Castleford's 11-8 victory over Wakefield Trinity in the 1990 Yorkshire Cup Final during the 1990–91 season at Elland Road, Leeds on Sunday 23 September 1990.

== Outside of Rugby League ==
Shaun currently works as a Paramedic for the Yorkshire Ambulance Service.
