= Keith England =

GB international rugby league footballer (born 1964)

Personal information
- Full name: Keith England
- Born: 27 February 1964 (age 61) Pontefract district, England

Playing information
- Position: Prop, Second-row
Club
Years	Team	Pld	T	G	FG	P
1982–94	Castleford	346	33	0	0	130
Representative
Years	Team	Pld	T	G	FG	P
1987–90	Great Britain	11	0	0	0	0
- Relatives: Anthony England (nephew)

Keith England (born 27 February 1964), also known by the nickname of "Beefy", is a former professional rugby league footballer who played in the 1980s and 1990s. He played at representative level for Great Britain, and at club level for Castleford, as a prop, or second-row.

== Background ==
Keith England's birth was registered in Pontefract, West Riding of Yorkshire, England.

== Playing career ==
=== International honours ===
Keith England won caps for Great Britain while at Castleford in 1987 in the 1985 - 1988 Rugby League World Cup against France, in 1987 against France, in 1989 against France, in 1989 in the 1989–1992 Rugby League World Cup against New Zealand, in 1990 against France, and Papua New Guinea, in 1990 in the 1989–1992 Rugby League World Cup against Papua New Guinea, in 1990 against New Zealand (2 matches), in 1990 in the 1989–1992 Rugby League World Cup against New Zealand, and in 1991 against France.

=== Challenge Cup Final appearances ===
Keith England at second-row in Castleford's 15-14 victory over Hull Kingston Rovers in the 1986 Challenge Cup Final during the 1985–86 season at Wembley Stadium, London on Saturday 3 May 1986, and played at prop and scored a try in the 12-28 defeat by Wigan in the 1992 Challenge Cup Final during the 1991–92 season at Wembley Stadium, London on Saturday 2 May 1992, in front of a crowd of 77,386.

=== County Cup Final appearances ===
Keith England played loose forward in Castleford's 2-13 defeat by Hull F.C. in the 1983 Yorkshire Cup Final during the 1983–84 season at Elland Road, Leeds on Saturday 15 October 1983, played loose forward in the 18-22 defeat by Hull Kingston Rovers in the 1986 Yorkshire Cup Final during the 1986–87 season at Headingley, Leeds on Sunday 27 October 1985, did not play the 12-12 draw with Bradford Northern in the 1987 Yorkshire Cup Final during the 1987–88 season at Headingley, Leeds on Saturday 17 October 1987, played at second-row (replaced by substitute Giles Boothroyd) in the 2-11 defeat by Bradford Northern in the 1987 Yorkshire Cup Final replay during the 1987–88 season at Elland Road, Leeds on Saturday 31 October 1987, played at prop in the 12-33 defeat by Leeds in the 1988 Yorkshire Cup Final during the 1988–89 season at Elland Road, Leeds on Sunday 16 October 1988, appeared as a substitute (replacing scrum-half Gary Atkins) in the 11-8 victory over Wakefield Trinity in the 1990 Yorkshire Cup Final during the 1990–91 season at Elland Road, Leeds on Sunday 23 September 1990, and was a substitute in the 28-6 victory over Bradford Northern in the 1991 Yorkshire Cup Final during the 1991–92 season at Elland Road, Leeds on Sunday 20 October 1991.
