= Stu Galbraith =

New Zealand rugby league footballer

Personal information
- Full name: Stuart James Galbraith
- Born: 22 April 1967 (age 58); Auckland, New Zealand
- Height: 173 cm (5 ft 8 in)
- Weight: 76 kg (12 st 0 lb)

Playing information
- Position: Halfback
Club
Years	Team	Pld	T	G	FG	P
1989	Chorley Borough	1	0	0	0	0
1989–90	Trafford Borough	22	15	0	0	60
1990–91	Rochdale Hornets	14	3	0	0	12
1992–94	Parramatta Eels	38	4	0	0	16
	Total	75	22	0	0	88

Stu Galbraith (born 22 April 1967) is a New Zealand former professional rugby league footballer who played for Chorley Borough, Rochdale Hornets, and Parramatta Eels

== Playing career ==
Galbraith started his career off with The Northcote Tigers before moving to England and played for English teams Chorley Borough and Rochdale. In 1992, Galbraith signed for Parramatta and was given the unenviable task of filling the missing halfback spot left by retired Parramatta legend Peter Sterling. Galbraith played two seasons with Parramatta, but could never match the heights set by his predecessor and left the club at the end of 1994 and then retired from rugby league.
