= Gary Price (rugby league, born 1961) =

English rugby league footballer

Personal information
- Full name: Gary Price
- Born: 9 March 1961 (age 64) Castleford, West Riding of Yorkshire, England

Playing information
- Position: Prop, Second-row, Loose forward
Club
Years	Team	Pld	T	G	FG	P
1979–86	York	161	40	2	1	151
1986–89	Leeds	50	7	0	0	28
1989–95	Featherstone Rovers	125	13	0	0	52
	Total	336	60	2	1	231
Representative
Years	Team	Pld	T	G	FG	P
1986	Yorkshire	1	0	0	0	0

Gary Price (born 9 March 1961) is an English former professional rugby league footballer who played in the 1970s, 1980s and 1990s. He played at representative level for Yorkshire, and Great Britain (Under-18s) British Amateur Rugby League Association (BARLA) (Under-18s), and at club level for Castleford Juniors ARLFC, York, Leeds and Featherstone Rovers, as a second-row.

== Background ==
Gary Price was born in Castleford, West Riding of Yorkshire, England.

== Playing career ==
Price started his professional career with York, making 161 appearances for the club between 1979 and 1986, scoring 40 tries. He was part of the team that finished as Second Division champions in the 1980–81 season, and played in the 1984 Challenge Cup semi-final defeat against Wigan. He was transferred to Leeds in October 1986.

=== Featherstone Rovers ===
Price was signed by Featherstone Rovers in August 1989. He made his début for the club on 17 September 1989.

Price played second-row, in Featherstone Rovers' 14–20 defeat by Bradford Northern in the 1989 Yorkshire Cup Final during the 1989–90 season at Headingley, Leeds on Sunday 5 November 1989, in front of a crowd of 12,607.

From 1993 onwards, he was usually referred to as "Gary S. Price", or by his nickname "Slugger", to avoid confusion with another second-rower signed by Rovers, who was also named Gary Price and who played for the club in 1993–95 and again in 1997–98.
