= Chris Bibb =

GB international rugby league footballer

Personal information
- Full name: Christopher Howard Bibb
- Born: 3 June 1968 (age 57); Pontefract, England

Playing information
- Height: 5 ft 9 in (1.75 m)
- Position: Fullback
Club
Years	Team	Pld	T	G	FG	P
1985–96	Featherstone Rovers	248	79	6	0	328
1993	→ Wakefield Trinity (loan)	1	0	0	0	0
	Total	249	79	6	0	328
Representative
Years	Team	Pld	T	G	FG	P
1989–92	Yorkshire	≥2
1987–89	Great Britain U21	5
1990	Great Britain	1	0	0	0	0

Christopher "Chris" Howard Bibb (born 3 June 1968) is an English former professional rugby league footballer who played in the 1980s and 1990s. He played at representative level for Great Britain and Yorkshire, and at club level for Featherstone Rovers, and Wakefield Trinity (loan), as an occasional goal-kicking fullback.

== Background ==
Chris Bibb was born in Pontefract, West Riding of Yorkshire, England.

== Playing career ==
=== International honours ===
Chris Bibb won a cap for Great Britain while at Featherstone Rovers in 1990 against New Zealand. He was part of the Great Britain Lions Tourists squad in 1990, and also played for GB Under-21s, and GB Colts teams.

=== County honours ===
Chris Bibb won caps for Yorkshire while at Featherstone Rovers; during the 1989–90 season against Lancashire, and during the 1991–92 season against Lancashire.

=== County Cup Final appearances ===
Chris Bibb played fullback, in Featherstone Rovers' 14–20 defeat by Bradford Northern in the 1989 Yorkshire Cup Final during the 1989–90 season at Headingley, Leeds on Sunday 5 November 1989.

=== Club career ===
Chris Bibb made his début for Featherstone Rovers on Sunday 3 November 1985, Featherstone Rovers most tries in a match record of six tries is jointly held by; Chris Bibb, Brad Dwyer and Michael Smith, Bibb scored six tries against Keighley on 17 September 1989, he had a loan spell at Wakefield Trinity during December 1993.

=== Testimonial match ===
Chris Bibb's benefit season/testimonial match at Featherstone Rovers took place during the 1995–96 season.

== Genealogical information ==
Chris Bibb is the son of the rugby league fullback who played in the 1960s and 1970s for Castleford, New Hunslet and Lock Lane ARLFC; Howard Bibb.
