= Aquila Emil =

PNG international rugby league footballer & murder victim

Personal information
- Born: c. 1967 Port Moresby, Papua New Guinea
- Died: 4 February 2011 (aged 44) Port Moresby, Papua New Guinea

Playing information
- Position: Five-eighth, Halfback
Representative
Years	Team	Pld	T	G	FG	P
1992–94	Papua New Guinea	5	2	1	0	10

Aquila Emil (died 4 February 2011) was a Papua New Guinean rugby league player who represented Papua New Guinea.

== Playing career ==
Emil played for Port Moresby's Brothers rugby league club during the 1980s. He was selected for the Papua New Guinea Kumuls and represented the side in two World Cup matches in 1992. He captained Papua New Guinea at the 1994 World Sevens.

Emil joined the North Queensland Cowboys on a two-year contract in 1994 but, after playing in 1995 pre-season trials, asked for a release. Emil was in the original Port Moresby Vipers squad to play in the Inter-City competition.

Following the end of his playing career, Emil worked at the schools rugby league level. Later, Emil became involved in the PNG NRL Bid's schools rollout program.

== Death ==
Emil died in a shooting in Port Moresby in the early morning of 4 February 2011. Theo Yasause, a 44-year-old former chief of staff to Papua New Guinea prime minister Michael Somare, was charged with Emil's murder. Yasause pleaded guilty and was sentenced to 30 years in prison.
