= Lee Jackson (rugby league) =

GB & England international rugby league footballer

Personal information
- Born: 12 March 1969 (age 56) Kingston upon Hull, England

Playing information
- Position: Hooker
Club
Years	Team	Pld	T	G	FG	P
1986–93	Hull FC	169	26	0	0	104
1993–96	Sheffield Eagles	55	6	0	0	24
1995	South Sydney	8	2	0	0	8
1996–98	Newcastle Knights	58	3	0	0	12
1999–00	Leeds Rhinos	53	7	0	0	28
2001–02	Hull FC	50	14	1	0	58
2003–05	York City Knights	74	14	2	0	60
	Total	467	72	3	0	294
Representative
Years	Team	Pld	T	G	FG	P
1990–94	Great Britain	17	1	0	0	4
1991	Yorkshire	1	0	0	0	0
1992–99	England	8	1	0	0	4
1997	Rest of World	1	0	0	0	0

Lee Jackson (born 12 March 1969) is an English former professional rugby league footballer who played in the 1980s, 1990s and 2000s. He was a hooker for the Great Britain, England, Hull F.C. (two spells), the Sheffield Eagles, the South Sydney Rabbitohs, the Newcastle Knights, the Leeds Rhinos and the York City Knights.

== Biography ==
Hull-born Jackson was arguably the most talented British hooker of his generation. He featured on the 1990 Lions tour and played in Hull FC's 14–4 victory over Widnes in the Premiership Final during the 1990–91 season at Old Trafford, Manchester on 12 May 1991, before joining Sheffield Eagles. He was selected to go on the 1992 Great Britain Lions tour of Australia and New Zealand.

Lee Jackson scored the fastest ever try in either code of rugby, after 9-seconds for Hull F.C. in the 8–12 defeat by Sheffield Eagles in the 1992 Yorkshire Cup semi-final during the 1992–93 season at the Don Valley Stadium on Tuesday 6 October 1992.

In 1993, Sheffield Eagles paid Hull F.C. a fee of £83,000 for Lee Jackson (based on increases in average earnings, this would be approximately £164,900 in 2013), this makes him the most expensive hooker in the history of rugby league.

Jackson was selected to play for England in the 1995 World Cup Final at hooker but Australia won the match and retained the Cup.

He later joined the Newcastle Knights, helping them to Grand Final success in 1997. He returned to Britain and had spells with Leeds Rhinos and Hull F.C. He finished his career with York City Knights, appearing 74 times before retiring in 2005.
