= Tuiyo Evei =

PNG international rugby league footballer

Personal information
- Born: Papua New Guinea
- Died: 1998

Playing information
- Position: Prop, Second-row
Club
Years	Team	Pld	T	G	FG	P
	Goroka Lahanis
Representative
Years	Team	Pld	T	G	FG	P
1988–95	Papua New Guinea	11	2	0	0	8

Tuiyo Evei was a Papua New Guinean professional rugby league footballer who represented Papua New Guinea at the 1995 World Cup.

== Playing career ==
Evei first represented Papua New Guinea in 1988 against Great Britain. He went on to play in eleven test matches for Papua New Guinea.

In 1991, Evei received a lifetime ban from rugby league after being held responsible for a riot that occurred after an international match against France. He had been dropped from the team after missing a training session, and following a narrow defeat to the French, Evei's supporters had stormed the field, knocking Kumuls coach Skerry Palanga to the ground and shouting abuse at officials. Evei successfully appealed against the ban after taking the league to court.

In 1993 he was part of the Goroka Lahanis side that defeated the Port Moresby Vipers to win the SP Cup grand final for the first time.

In 1995 he was part of Papua New Guinea's World Cup campaign, playing in one match at the tournament.

== Death ==
He died in 1998 in a car accident.
