= Bernard Bate =

American linguist

- Born: 1960
- Died: 11 March 2016 (aged 55–56); California, USA
- Education: University of Chicago
- Occupations: Anthropologist, professor, writer

Bernard Bate (1960–2016) was an American linguistic anthropologist. He specialized in the Tamil language and the history of public speaking, and was professor of anthropology at Yale University and at Yale-NUS College. His best known work was the book Tamil Oratory and Dravidian Aesthetic: Democratic Practice in South India which describes the emergence of a tradition of public speaking in the Tamil language during the Indian independence movement. He received his PhD in anthropology from the University of Chicago. He taught at Yale for ten years before moving to the Yale-NUS College in Singapore, where he was instrumental in the development of the college's programs. Bate died in his sleep on 11 March 2016.
