= Ipisa Wanega =

Papua New Guinea international rugby league player

Personal information
- Born: Papua New Guinea

Playing information
- Position: Fullback
Representative
Years	Team	Pld	T	G	FG	P
1988–91	Papua New Guinea	9	0	6	0	12

Ipisa Wanega is a Papua New Guinean rugby league player who represented Papua New Guinea national rugby league team in multiple Rugby League World Cups.

== Playing career ==
Wanega made his debut for Papua New Guinea in 1988 against Australia. He also played against the touring 1990 Great Britain Lions and 1991 Kangaroos. He finished his career with nine test matches and six goals.

== Later years ==
Wanega is also a teacher and is the principal of Awaba High School. He is the patron of Dibili Rugby League.
