= Gideon Kouoru =

PNG international rugby league footballer

Playing information
- Position: Lock
Representative
Years	Team	Pld	T	G	FG	P
1987–91	Papua New Guinea	8	0	0	0	0

Gideon Kouoru is a Papua New Guinean rugby league footballer who represented Papua New Guinea during the 1985–88 World Cup.

He played in eight test matches for Papua New Guinea between 1987 and 1991.
