= Victor Aramoana =

New Zealand rugby league player

Personal information
- Born: New Zealand

Playing information
- Position: Wing
Club
Years	Team	Pld	T	G	FG	P
1983–94	Upper Hutt Tigers		328	0	0	1312
Representative
Years	Team	Pld	T	G	FG	P
1983–92	Wellington	54	41	0	0	164
	New Zealand Māori

Victor Aramoana is a New Zealand rugby league player who represented Wellington.

== Playing career ==
Aramoana made his senior debut in 1983 for the Upper Hutt Tigers in the Wellington Rugby League competition and also played his first match for Wellington that same year.

Aramoana also played for the New Zealand Māori side.

In 1992 he became only the seventh player to play 50 games for Wellington. He retired in 1994, having played 54 games for Wellington and scored 328 tries for Upper Hutt.
