= Denis Betts =

English rugby league footballer (born 1969)

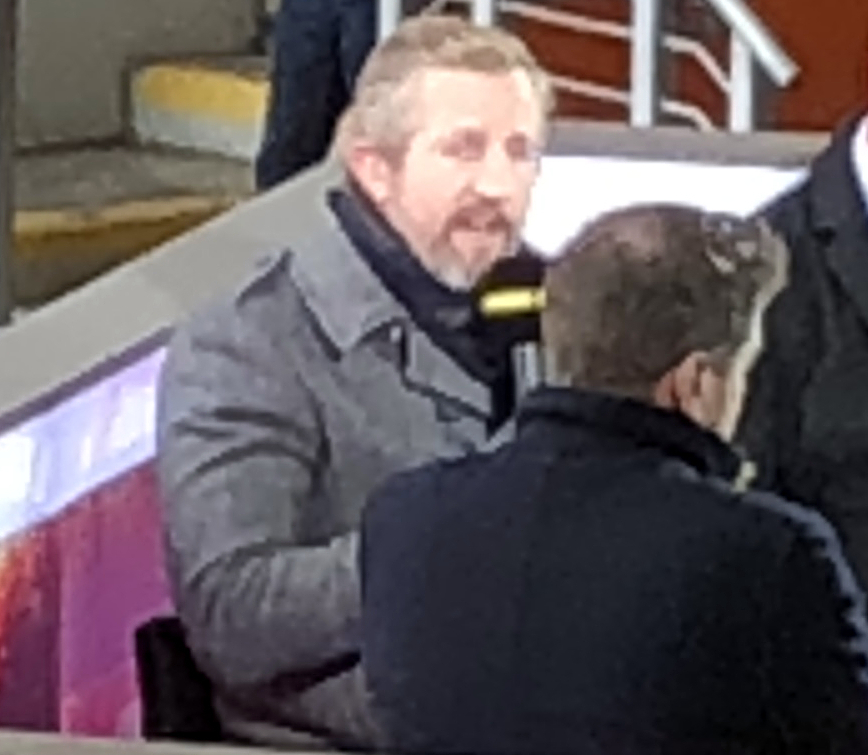

Personal information
- Full name: Denis Charles Betts
- Born: 14 September 1969 (age 57) Salford, Lancashire, England

Playing information
- Height: 6 ft 0 in (1.83 m)
- Weight: 15 st 0 lb (95 kg)
- Position: Second row
Club
| Years | Team | Pld | T | G | FG | P |
|---|---|---|---|---|---|---|
| 1986–95 | Wigan | 160 | 20 | 0 | 0 | 78 |
| 1995–97 | Auckland Warriors | 42 | 11 | 0 | 0 | 44 |
| 1998–01 | Wigan Warriors | 116 | 34 | 0 | 0 | 138 |
| | Total | 318 | 65 | 0 | 0 | 260 |
Representative
| Years | Team | Pld | T | G | FG | P |
| 1990–99 | Great Britain | 32 | 8 | 0 | 0 | 32 |
| 1991 | Lancashire | 1 | 0 | 0 | 0 | 0 |
| 1995 | England | 4 | 1 | 0 | 0 | 4 |

Coaching information
Club
| Years | Team | Gms | W | D | L | W% |
| 2004–05 | Wigan Warriors |
| 2010–18 | Widnes Vikings | 233 | 94 | 6 | 132 | 40 |
| 2022 | Newcastle Thunder | 1 | 1 | 0 | 0 | 100 |
| 2024– | Wigan Warriors Women | 0 | 0 | 0 | 0 |
| | Total | 234 | 95 | 6 | 132 | 41 |

Denis Charles Betts (born 14 September 1969) is an English rugby league coach and former rugby league footballer. He is the head-coach of Wigan Warriors Women and a former assistant coach of the England national team.

A second-row, Betts played in the 1980s, 1990s and 2000s for the Wigan Warriors, with whom he won numerous titles, and for the Auckland Warriors. He won four caps for England and 32 for Great Britain, setting a record for a forward. He played in two Rugby League World Cups, in 1989-92 and 1995, including playing in the finals of both.

== Early life and education ==
Denis Charles Betts was born on 14 September 1969 in Salford, Lancashire. His younger brother, Darren Betts, played rugby league for Salford in the 1990s.

Betts attended Clarendon High School.

He was a Manchester United youth team player. He signed for Wigan from Leigh Miners ARL (also known as Leigh Rangers) on 14 October 1986.

== Playing career ==
Betts was a part of the Wigan team of the 1980s, and 90's; he won six Championships, seven Rugby League Challenge Cups, three Premierships, four John Player/Regal Trophies, and two Lancashire Cups. He also received the Lance Todd Trophy (1991) and the Man of Steel Award (1995). He featured in three World Club Challenge matches for Wigan, winning two, against Penrith Panthers in 1991 and Brisbane Broncos in 1994.

In 1995, at the height of the Super League War he signed a deal with the Auckland Warriors, one of the new clubs, coached by former Wigan coach John Monie.

Later that year Betts became the first player to win both England and Great Britain caps while not playing in the English leagues. With former Wigan team-mate Shaun Edwards ruled out by injury, Betts captained England from the second row in the 1995 Rugby League World Cup final at Wembley Stadium, but Australia won the match 16–8 and retained the World Cup. Betts' selection as captain of England meant he was the first player given the honour while not playing in the English leagues.

During the 1996 Auckland Warriors season Betts captained the club. He was selected as vice captain for the 1996 Great Britain Lions tour of Papua New Guinea, Fiji and New Zealand, playing in all Tests against host nations at second-row. The 1997 season was Betts' last with the Auckland Warriors as he returned to England to continue playing for Wigan.

Betts returned to play in the 1998 Wigan Warriors season in Europe's Super League competition, and lost the 1998 Challenge Cup Final to Sheffield Eagles. He missed Wigan's 1998 Super League Grand Final victory that year through injury. Betts scored Wigan's opening try in the last game at Central Park, and their first try at the JJB Stadium.

At the end of 1999's Super League IV, Betts was selected to play for Great Britain in the 1999 Tri-Nations tournament in both of their matches against New Zealand and Australia.

Betts played for Wigan in their 2000 Super League Grand Final loss to St. Helens, and their 2001 Grand Final loss to the Bradford Bulls. He was persuaded to retire from playing at the age of 32, to help Wigan get under the salary cap.

In total, Betts made 32 appearances for Great Britain, the joint highest ever for a forward, and toured three times, in 1990, 1992 and 1996. He also captained England in the 1995 World Cup final, which they lost to Australia at Wembley in front of 66,540 fans.

== Coaching career ==
At the end of 2001, Betts moved into coaching as Under-18s coach at the Wigan Warriors, and then to under-21s, which he led to victory in the 2003 U21 Grand Final. In July 2003, Stuart Raper was terminated as the Wigan Warriors coach, and he was replaced by Mike Gregory. Gregory appointed Betts as his assistant. The Wigan Warriors went on reach the Grand Final, but lost to Bradford Bulls.

The following season, the Wigan Warriors reached final, losing this time to St. Helens in the Challenge Cup Final. Betts took temporary charge in May 2004 when Gregory stepped down due to illness. He held the position for a year before he was moved sideways to make way for the appointment of new head coach Ian Millward, who had left St. Helens. Betts continued to work under Millward until the end of the 2005's Super League X but left in November after refusing to take a post as coach of the academy Under-21 team.

In January 2006 he took a position as skills and development coach with Guinness Premiership rugby union club Gloucester. He left during June 2010, despite having another year on his contract. Speaking about his time at Gloucester, he said "It's a really passionate place and I hope they can get the success they deserve. I really enjoyed the place, especially the match-day atmosphere and the Shed."

While at Gloucester, Betts emerged as a surprise contender for the vacant England coaching job, which he applied for in March 2010, ultimately losing out to Bradford Bulls' Steve McNamara.

In November 2010, Betts was appointed coach of Championship club; the Widnes Vikings. In May 2011, he was reappointed to manage the Widnes Vikings into the Super League in 2012.

Betts was appointed assistant coach to Wayne Bennett with England in April 2016. England finished third in the 2016 Four Nations, and were runners-up in the 2017 World Cup.

In May 2018 the Widnes Vikings terminated Betts' contract with immediate effect due to the Widnes Vikings poor run of winning only three games out of twelve.

In October 2023, Betts was announced as head coach of Wigan Warriors Women In his first season, he wore his first piece of silverware as head coach and Wigan's first since 2018 after winning the RFL Women's Nines competition, a trophy the club retained the following year.

Betts first major trophy as head coach came at Wembley in 2025 following Wigan's victory in the 2025 Women's Challenge Cup final. Betts's team also performed well in the league that season which saw him named Women's Super League Coach of the Year in 2025, after completing the treble with Wigan.

== Honours ==
=== As player ===
==== Wigan Warriors ====
- First Division / Super League
  - Winners (8): 1986–87, 1989–90, 1990–91, 1991–92, 1992–93, 1993–94, 1994–95, 1998
- Challenge Cup
  - Winners (8): 1987–88, 1988–89, 1989–90, 1990–91, 1991–92, 1992–93, 1993–94, 1994–95
- World Club Challenge
  - Winners (2): 1991, 1994
- Premiership
  - Winners (4): 1986–87, 1991–92, 1993–94, 1994–95
- Lancashire Cup
  - Winners (4): 1986–87, 1987–88, 1988–89, 1992–93
- League Cup
  - Winners (5): 1986–87, 1988–89, 1989–90, 1992–93, 1994–95
- Charity Shield
  - Winners (2): 1987–88, 1991–92

=== England ===
- World Cup:
  - Runners-up: 1995

=== As head coach ===
==== Wigan Warriors Women ====
- Super League
  - Grand Final (1): 2025
  - League League Shield (2): 2025, 2026
- Challenge Cup
  - Winners (2): 2025, 2026
- Nines
  - Winners (2): 2024, 2025

=== Individual ===
- Man of Steel: 1995
- Lance Todd Trophy: 1991
- Rugby League World Cup Team of the Tournament: 1995
- Women's Super League Coach of the Year: 2025, 2026
