= Daniel Divet =

France international rugby league player

Personal information
- Born: 11 December 1966 (age 59) Bordeaux, Gironde, Nouvelle-Aquitaine, France

Playing information
- Position: Second-row, Loose forward
Club
Years	Team	Pld	T	G	FG	P
1985–88	Limoux
1988–92	AS Carcassonne
1992–94	Hull FC	37	3	0	0	12
1994–95	Featherstone Rovers	28	8	0	0	32
1995–98	Limoux
	Total	65	11	0	0	44
Representative
Years	Team	Pld	T	G	FG	P
1987–94	France	16	2	0	0	8

Daniel Divet (born 11 December 1966) is a French former rugby league footballer who played as second-row or loose forward.

== Biography ==
Born in Bordeaux, France, Divet moved to Australia at a young age, where he began playing rugby league. He returned to France in 1985, aged 18, and signed for Limoux.

During his career, he is one of the few French players to start an overseas experience playing for English sides such as Hull FC, and Featherstone Rovers. In France, he notably played for Carcassonne and Limoux.

His club performance allowed him to represent France with which he notably disputed the 1985-1988 and 1989-1992 Rugby League World Cups.

== Honours ==
=== Club ===
- French Rugby League Championship:
  - Runner-up in 1990 (Carcassonne)
  - Champion in 1992 (Carcassonne)
- Lord Derby Cup:
  - Champion en 1990 (Carcassonne)
  - Champion in 1996 (Limoux)
  - Runner-up in 1997 (Limoux)
