= Deryck Fox =

English RL coach and former GB & England international rugby league footballer

Personal information
- Born: 17 September 1964 (age 61) Dewsbury, Yorkshire, England

Playing information
- Position: Scrum-half
Club
Years	Team	Pld	T	G	FG	P
1983–92	Featherstone	307+2	78	328	52	1020
1986	Wests Magpies	8	0	0	0	0
1992–95	Bradford	106+1	17	330	16	744
1995–97	Featherstone	43+1	6	45	11	125
1998	Batley	3	0	1	0	2
1998	Rochdale	11	0	41	0	82
	Total	482	101	745	79	1973
Representative
Years	Team	Pld	T	G	FG	P
1985–91	Yorkshire	8	2	6	1	21
1985–92	Great Britain	10+4	3	4	0	20
1995	England	2	1	5	0	14

Coaching information
Club
Years	Team	Gms	W	D	L	W%
1998–99	Rochdale Hornets

Deryck Fox (born 17 September 1964) is an English former professional rugby league footballer who played in the 1980s and 1990s, and coached in the 1990s, 2000s and 2010s. He played at representative level for Great Britain, England and Yorkshire, and at club level for Featherstone Rovers, Western Suburbs Magpies, Bradford Northern, Batley and Rochdale Hornets, as a scrum-half, and coached at club level for Rochdale Hornets, Shaw Cross ARLFC, Batemans Bay Tigers and Dewsbury Celtic. He attended St John Fisher's RC High School in Dewsbury.

== Club career ==
=== Early career ===
Fox began playing rugby league for St John Fisher Catholic High School in Dewsbury, and was selected for the 1983 BARLA Great Britain youth tour of New Zealand. He turned professional after returning from the tour, signing for Featherstone Rovers.

=== Featherstone Rovers ===
Fox made his debut as a substitute against Hull in an 8–24 defeat in the first round of the Yorkshire Cup on 4 September 1983.

He played scrum-half, was captain, and scored 3-goals in Featherstone Rovers' 14–20 defeat by Bradford Northern in the 1989 Yorkshire Cup final during the 1989–90 season at Headingley, Leeds on Sunday 5 November 1989.

=== Bradford Northern ===
In 1992, Fox was signed by Bradford Northern for a fee of £140,000 - a record fee at the time for a scrum-half.

He played scrum-half in Bradford Northern's 8–15 defeat by Wigan in the 1992–93 Regal Trophy final during the 1992–93 season at Elland Road, Leeds on Saturday 23 January 1993.

=== Later career ===
Fox returned to Featherstone during the 1995–96 season, and went on to play for Batley Bulldogs and Rochdale Hornets.

In 2010, Fox was inducted into the Featherstone Rovers Hall of Fame.

== Representative career ==
=== County honours ===
Fox won caps for Yorkshire while at Featherstone Rovers; during the 1985–86 season against Lancashire and New Zealand, during the 1986–87 season against Lancashire, during the 1987–88 season against Lancashire, and Papua New Guinea, during the 1988–89 season against Lancashire, during the 1989–90 season against Lancashire, and during the 1991–92 season against Lancashire.

=== International honours ===
Fox won caps for England while at Bradford Northern in 1995 against Wales and France, and won caps for Great Britain while at Featherstone Rovers in 1985 against France (2 matches), and New Zealand (3 matches), in 1986 against France (2 matches), and Australia (2 matches), in 1989 against New Zealand (sub), in 1990 against Papua New Guinea (sub), in 1991 against Papua New Guinea (sub), in 1992 against France (sub), and while at Bradford Northern in 1992 Australia.

He was selected to go on the 1990 and 1992 Great Britain Lions tour.

== Personal life ==
Deryck Fox is the son of the rugby league prop who played in the 1970s for Batley, John Fox, and the brother of the rugby league footballer who played in the 1980s for Featherstone Rovers, Martin Fox.
