= Craig Salvatori =

Australian rugby league footballer (born 1966)

Personal information
- Born: 22 January 1966 (age 60) Sydney, New South Wales, Australia

Playing information
- Position: Prop, Second-row
Club
Years	Team	Pld	T	G	FG	P
1986–95	Eastern Suburbs	117	21	4	0	92
1996	South Sydney	22	2	0	0	8
	Total	139	23	4	0	100
Representative
Years	Team	Pld	T	G	FG	P
1991–94	NSW City	4	0	0	0	0
1991–93	New South Wales	5	1	0	0	4
1991	Australia	2	0	0	0	0

Coaching information
Representative
Years	Team	Gms	W	D	L	W%
1997–99	Italy	2	1	0	1	50

Craig Salvatori (born 22 January 1966) is an Australian former professional rugby league footballer who played in the 1980s and 1990s. He spent most of his career at the Eastern Suburbs club. His position of choice was in the front row. Salvatori also played for the South Sydney Rabbitohs as well as representing Australia and New South Wales.

== Playing career ==
In 1985, Salvatori was graded by Eastern Suburbs from the Dunbar Hotel club in Paddington and he first broke into the top grade in 1986. During his time with Easts, Salvatori played more than 100 matches for the club, many as captain. Salvatori was a large and 'fiery' front row forward but he possessed skill and some pace, scoring 21 tries. In the 1991 season, Salvatori won the Dally M award for Front Rower of the Year. In the later part of his playing career, Salvatori suffered several knee injuries and he spent his final year of first grade with the South Sydney Rabbitohs.

== Representative career ==
In 1991, Salvatori first gained selection for Australia, playing in two matches against New Zealand. Salvatori was also selected for the Australian tour of Papua New Guinea at the end of the year but he sustained an injury in the first tour match which ended his tour and prevented him from playing in any of the tests. It would be the final time that Salvatori was selected to play for Australia.

Salvatori was selected to represent New South Wales as a reserve in five consecutive matches:

- Game III of the 1991 State of Origin series
- Games I, II and III of the 1992 State of Origin series, scoring a try in Game I
- Game I of the 1993 State of Origin series

== Post-playing career ==
Since his retirement, Salvatori took on a role coaching rugby league's emerging nations. He coached the Italian side in the 1997 World Sevens competition and the 1999 Mediterranean Cup competition.

In 2001, Salvatori was named as a reserve in the Indigenous Team of the Century, captained by Artie Beetson.

Salvatori currently runs a guest house in Byron Bay.

His second wife, Kathy Salvatori, was killed in the 2002 Bali bombings. Salvatori has since remarried.

== Footnotes ==
Sporting positions
Preceded by	Coach Italy; 1997-1999	Succeeded by David Riolo; 2003-2006
