= John Devereux (rugby) =

Former GB & Wales dual-code rugby international

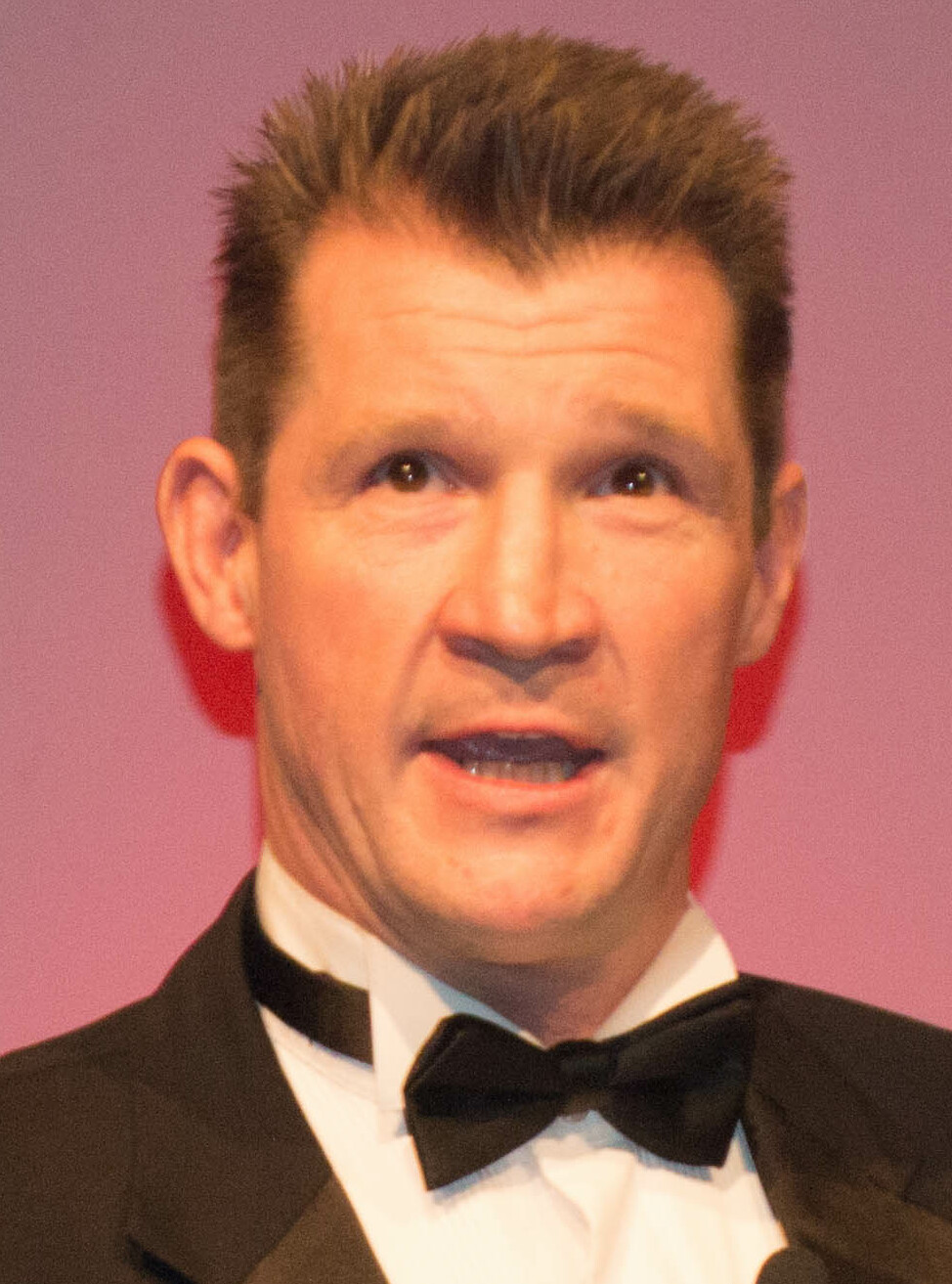

Personal information
- Full name: John Anthony Devereux
- Born: 30 March 1966 (age 60) Pontycymer, Bridgend, Wales

Playing information
- Height: 6 ft 2 in (1.88 m)
- Weight: 15 st 4 lb (97 kg)

Rugby union
- Position: Centre, Wing
Club
| Years | Team | Pld | T | G | FG | P |
|---|---|---|---|---|---|---|
| 1986–89 | Bridgend RFC | 42 | | | | 64 |
| 1997–99 | Sale Sharks | 8 | 0 | 0 | 0 | 0 |
| 1999–02 | Worcester | 28 | 2 | 0 | 0 | 10 |
| 2002–03 | Bridgend RFC | 19 | 5 | 0 | 0 | 25 |
| 2003–03 | Pontypool RFC | 7 | 1 | 0 | 0 | 5 |
| 2004–05 | Maesteg RFC | 12 | 0 | 0 | 0 | 0 |
| | Total | 116 | 8 | 0 | 0 | 104 |
Representative
| Years | Team | Pld | T | G | FG | P |
| 1986–89 | Wales | 21 | 4 | 0 | 0 | 20 |
| 1986–89 | British & Irish Lions | 1 | 0 | 0 | 0 | 0 |

Rugby league
- Position: Wing, Centre
Club
| Years | Team | Pld | T | G | FG | P |
|---|---|---|---|---|---|---|
| 1989–97 | Widnes | 185 | 119 | 30 | 0 | 536 |
| 1993 | Manly Sea Eagles | 15 | 2 | 2 | 0 | 12 |
| | Total | 200 | 121 | 32 | 0 | 548 |
Representative
| Years | Team | Pld | T | G | FG | P |
| 1991–00 | Wales | 12 | 3 | 1 | 0 | 14 |
| 1992–93 | Great Britain | 8 | 6 | 0 | 0 | 24 |

John Anthony Devereux (born 30 March 1966) is a Welsh former dual-code rugby football international.

== Rugby Union ==
In 1989 he toured with the British & Irish Lions, and at the time played club rugby union for Bridgend.

Devereux also made an appearance for the British and Irish Lions against a Rest of the World XV in 1986 following the 1986 tour to South Africa being abandoned due to their apartheid regime. This was later given test status by the IRB in 2009.

== Rugby League ==
=== Club career ===
He initially played for Widnes in England and the Manly-Warringah Sea Eagles in Australia.

Devereux was as an interchange/substitute in Widnes' 24–18 victory over Salford in the 1990 Lancashire Cup Final during the 1990–91 season at Central Park, Wigan on Saturday 29 September 1990.

Devereux played right wing in Widnes' 24–0 victory over Leeds in the 1991–92 Regal Trophy Final during the 1991–92 season at Central Park, Wigan on Saturday 11 January 1992.

Late in his career, prior to retirement he played for Bridgend Blue Bulls.

=== International ===
He achieving representative selection for the Great Britain and Wales national rugby league teams.

Devereux won his first cap for Wales (RL) while at Widnes in 1991. He returned to rugby league in 2000 to represent Wales in the 2000 Rugby League World Cup. He was capped for Wales 12 times during his rugby league career.

Devereux was called up as an injury replacement for Anthony Sullivan during the 1990 Great Britain Lions tour. He was also selected to go on the 1992 Great Britain Lions tour of Australia and New Zealand. Devereux played from the bench in Great Britain's defeat by Australia in the 1992 Rugby League World Cup final at Wembley. Devereux scored 2 tries from right wing in Great Britain’s 29-12 second test victory against New Zealand at Central Park Wigan on 30 October 1993.

After retiring from playing he became team manager of Wales.

== Personal life ==
Devereux lives in Bridgend, Wales with his wife and two daughters.
