= Michael Angara =

PNG international rugby league footballer

Personal information
- Born: Papua New Guinea

Playing information
- Position: Second-row, Lock
Representative
Years	Team	Pld	T	G	FG	P
1990–96	Papua New Guinea	10	0	0	0	0

Michael Angara is a Papua New Guinean former professional rugby league footballer who represented Papua New Guinea at the 1995 World Cup.

== Playing career ==
Angara made his debut for Papua New Guinea in 1990, playing two test matches against Great Britain. He became a regular member of the test side and was included in the squad for the 1995 World Cup, where he played in one match against the New Zealand national rugby league team. In 1996 he played his last test match for Papua New Guinea, a defeat by New Zealand.
