= Ngala Lapan =

Former PNG international rugby league footballer

Personal information
- Born: Papua New Guinea

Playing information
- Position: Halfback
Representative
Years	Team	Pld	T	G	FG	P
1988–92	Papua New Guinea	8	0	0	0	0

Ngala Lapan is a Papua New Guinean rugby league player who represented Papua New Guinea national rugby league team, including in Rugby League World Cup matches.
