= Paul Dixon (rugby league) =

GB international rugby league footballer

Personal information
- Full name: Paul A. Dixon
- Born: 28 October 1962 (age 62); Huddersfield, England

Playing information
- Position: Prop, Second-row
Club
Years	Team	Pld	T	G	FG	P
1982–85	Huddersfield	89	29	0	0	108
1985	→ Oldham (loan)	5	1	0	0	4
1985–88	Halifax	129	52	0	0	208
1987	Canterbury-Bankstown	2	0	0	0	0
1989–93	Leeds	140	43	0	0	172
1991	Gold Coast	10	1	0	0	4
1993–95	Bradford Northern	75	21	0	0	84
1995–97	Sheffield Eagles	27	4	0	0	16
1997	Huddersfield Giants	19	3	0	0	12
	Total	496	154	0	0	608
Representative
Years	Team	Pld	T	G	FG	P
1987–92	Great Britain	15	2	0	0	8
1987–91	Yorkshire	5	0	0	0	0

Paul Dixon (born 28 October 1962) is an English former professional rugby league footballer who played in the 1980s and 1990s. He played at representative level for Great Britain, and at club level for Huddersfield, Oldham, Halifax, Canterbury-Bankstown Bulldogs, Leeds, Gold Coast Seagulls, Bradford Northern, and the Sheffield Eagles, as a prop or second-row.

== Playing career ==
=== Club career ===
During the 1985–86 season, Dixon played in all 30 League games, and scored 11-tries in Halifax's victory in the Championship.

Dixon played at second-row in Halifax's 19–18 victory over St. Helens in the 1987 Challenge Cup Final during the 1986–87 season at Wembley Stadium, London on Saturday 2 May 1987.

In January 1989, Dixon was signed by Leeds in a deal worth £140,000, with Paul Medley transferring from Leeds to Halifax.

In July 1993, Dixon was signed by Bradford Northern. In November 1995, he joined Sheffield Eagles for a fee of £20,000.

=== International career ===
Dixon won caps for Great Britain while at Halifax in 1987 against France, in 1988 against France (2 matches), and in the 1985–1988 Rugby League World Cup against Papua New Guinea. He was selected for the 1988 Great Britain Lions tour, and played in the first two Tests against Australia, but returned home early after suffering a broken thumb in the second Test. While at Leeds he won further caps in 1990 against Papua New Guinea, in the 1989–1992 Rugby League World Cup against Papua New Guinea, in 1990 against New Zealand (2 matches), in the 1989–1992 Rugby League World Cup against New Zealand, in 1990 against Australia (3 matches), and in 1992 against France.

== Post-playing ==
Since 2011, Dixon has been part of the Rugby Football League's Match Review Panel.
