= Paul Eastwood =

GB international rugby league footballer

Personal information
- Full name: Paul Eastwood
- Born: 3 December 1965 (age 59); Hull, England

Playing information
- Position: Wing
Club
Years	Team	Pld	T	G	FG	P
1984–94	Hull FC	288	117	496	0	1460
1995–96	Hull Kingston Rovers	26	14	13	0	82
	Total	314	131	509	0	1542
Representative
Years	Team	Pld	T	G	FG	P
1990–92	Great Britain	13	7	39	0	106

Paul Eastwood (born 3 December 1965) is an English former rugby league footballer who played as a winger for Hull FC and Hull Kingston Rovers between 1984 and 1996. He was also capped 13 times by Great Britain between 1990 and 1992.

== Background ==
Eastwood was born in Kingston upon Hull, East Riding of Yorkshire, England

== Career ==
Paul Eastwood was signed by Hull F.C. as a teenager and made his first appearance for them in 1984.

Eastwood played left wing in Hull FC's 24-31 defeat by Castleford in the 1986 Yorkshire Cup Final during the 1986–87 season at Headingley, Leeds on Saturday 11 October 1986.

He set up the second try for Russ Walker as Hull F.C. won the 1991 Premiership final against Widnes at Old Trafford.

Eastwood's Testimonial match at Hull F.C. took place in 1994 at their home ground, The Boulevard. In 10 seasons at Hull, he scored 117 tries and nearly 1,500 points.

Eastwood did not play in the 1994–95 season due to a groin injury, and left Hull the following season to join local rivals Hull Kingston Rovers, where he finished his career. As of 2007, worked as the manager of a plumbing and heating company BSS in Manchester.

== International ==
Eastwood won the first of his 18 test and World Cup caps for Great Britain against Papua New Guinea in Goroka during the 1990 Great Britain Lions tour as the Lions suffered a shock 20–18 defeat by the Kumuls. He would score the first of his 7 test tries in the game at the Danny Leahy Oval.

Later that year played in all three Ashes series tests against the touring Australians, scoring 2 tries in the Lions 19–12 win in the opening test at Wembley Stadium. In the second test at Old Trafford he missed two pressure, but relatively simple goals that could have won Britain The Ashes for the first time since 1970, as Australia won a tense game 14–10. After hooking an earlier conversion attempt, when Paul Loughlin scored an intercept try Eastwood, a left foot kicker, asked the St. Helens goal kicking centre if he wanted to take the kick (which was in almost the same spot as his earlier attempt) which suited his right foot kicking. Loughlin however declined and Eastwood ultimately sliced his kick to the left of the posts. Had it gone over it would have given the Lions a 12–10 lead with just 10 minutes remaining. Australia would go on to win the third and deciding test 14–0 at the Elland Road stadium in Leeds.

Eastwood was selected to go on the 1992 Great Britain Lions tour of Australasia, playing in 5 of the 6 test matches on the tour (one against PNG and 2 each against Australia and New Zealand). With 58 points from 3 tries and 23 goals, Eastwood was the leading point scorer on tour. While in Australia, Eastwood came under fan and media criticism for the amount of time he took with his goal kicks. He kicked at around 80% accuracy during his 8 games on tour. He played the last of his 18 tests, kicking 3 goals in Great Britain's 19–16 win over New Zealand at Carlaw Park in Auckland on 19 July 1992.
