= Mark Nixon (rugby league) =

New Zealand international rugby league footballer

Personal information
- Full name: Mark Byron Nixon
- Born: 5 February 1968 (age 58) New Zealand

Playing information
- Position: Stand-off
Club
Years	Team	Pld	T	G	FG	P
	Hornby (CRL)
1989–91	Rochdale Hornets	50	23	0	0	92
1994	Canterbury Cardinals	25	11	0	0	44
1994–95	Featherstone Rovers	18	6	0	0	24
1996	Canterbury Cardinals	6	3	0	0	12
	Total	99	43	0	0	172
Representative
Years	Team	Pld	T	G	FG	P
1988–97	Canterbury
1990–93	New Zealand	2	0	0	0	0

Mark Byron Nixon is a New Zealand former rugby league footballer who played in the 1980s and 1990s. He played at representative for New Zealand and Canterbury (captain, as a stand-off.

== Playing career ==
Nixon played for the Hornby club in the Canterbury Rugby League competition and represented Canterbury. In 1989 he spent ten weeks in Australia with the Canberra Raiders as part of the New Zealand Rugby League's "Rookie Scheme".

In 1990 he was selected for the New Zealand national rugby league team and played in two Test matches against Papua New Guinea. Later that year he moved to England, joining the Rochdale Hornets for the 1990/91 season.

In 1993 Nixon captained Canterbury and was selected as a Kiwi triallist. From there he was selected as part of the Kiwis touring side to Great Britain and France but did not play in any Test matches.

In 1994 Nixon was part of the Canterbury Country Cardinals in the new Lion Red Cup. At the end of the year he again moved to England, playing for Featherstone Rovers during the 1994/95 season.

Nixon again represented Canterbury in 1997. He played for Hornby.

== Later years ==
Nixon is a long-standing current employee of the Aviation security services of New Zealand, based at Christchurch International Airport.

Previous to this between his stints overseas playing Rugby League, Nixon had a long association with NZ Post.
