= Gary Price (rugby league, born 1969) =

English RL coach and former GB international rugby league footballer

Personal information
- Full name: Gary Howard Price
- Born: 28 October 1969 (age 56) Wakefield, West Riding of Yorkshire, England

Playing information
- Position: Wing, Centre, Prop, Second-row, Loose forward
Club
Years	Team	Pld	T	G	FG	P
1988–93	Wakefield Trinity	220	35	0	0	140
1993–95	Featherstone Rovers	125	23	0	0	92
1996	South Sydney	1	0	0	0	0
1997–98	Featherstone Rovers
1999–01	Wakefield Trinity
	Total	346	58	0	0	232
Representative
Years	Team	Pld	T	G	FG	P
1991	Great Britain	+1	0	0	0	0

Coaching information
Club
Years	Team	Gms	W	D	L	W%
2003–05	Featherstone Rovers	54	24	4	26	44

Gary Howard Price (born 28 October 1969) is an English former professional rugby league footballer who played in the 1980s, 1990s and 2000s, and coached in the 2000s. He played at representative level for Great Britain, and at club level for Wakefield Trinity (two spells) (captain), Featherstone Rovers (two spells), and South Sydney Rabbitohs, as a wing, centre, prop, second-row, or loose forward, and coached at club level for Wakefield Trinity (assistant), and Featherstone Rovers.

== Playing career ==
=== Wakefield Trinity ===
Price played second-row, in Wakefield Trinity's 8–11 defeat by Castleford in the 1990–91 Yorkshire Cup Final during the 1990–91 season at Elland Road, Leeds on Sunday 23 September 1990, and played second-row, and scored a try in the 29–16 victory over Sheffield Eagles in the 1992–93 Yorkshire Cup Final during the 1992–93 season at Elland Road, Leeds on Sunday 18 October 1992.

=== Featherstone Rovers ===
Price was signed by Featherstone Rovers in August 1993. During his time at the club, he was usually referred to as "Gary H. Price" to avoid confusion with another Gary Price who played for the club from 1989 to 1995.

Price played second-row, in Featherstone Rovers' 22–24 defeat by Wakefield Trinity in the 1998 First Division Grand Final at McAlpine Stadium, Huddersfield on 26 September 1998.

=== International honours ===
Gary Price won a cap for Great Britain while at Wakefield Trinity in 1991 as an interchange/substitute against Papua New Guinea.
