= Nande Yer =

PNG international rugby league footballer

Personal information
- Born: c. 1970 Ialibu, Papua New Guinea, Australia
- Died: 1 December 2012 (aged 42) Port Moresby, Papua New Guinea

Playing information
- Position: Prop, Second-row
Club
Years	Team	Pld	T	G	FG	P
	Mendi Muruks
Representative
Years	Team	Pld	T	G	FG	P
1991	Northern Zone
1992–96	Papua New Guinea	11	0	0	0	0

Nande Yer was a Papua New Guinean rugby league footballer who represented Papua New Guinea at the 1995 World Cup.

== Early life ==
Nande Yer was born about 1970 in Ialibu, a small village in the Southern Highlands Province of what was then the Territory of Papua and New Guinea, under the control of Australia. His cousin, Raymond Kahl, is also a Papua New Guinean footballer.

== Playing career ==
Yer played for the Mendi Muruks and represented the Northern Zone in 1991 against the touring Great Britain Lions. He played eleven tests for Papua New Guinea between 1992 and 1996.

In 2001 he served as a selector for the Mendi Muruks.

== Death ==
Yer died on 1 December 2012, at the Port Moresby General Hospital after a heart attack. He is survived by his wife, Bida, and three children, Brownwin, Norberta, and Makena.
