= Skerry Palanga =

PNG professional rugby league coach

Personal information
- Born: Papua New Guinea

Coaching information
Representative
| Years | Team | Gms | W | D | L | W% |
| 1982–91 | Papua New Guinea | 18 | 5 | 0 | 13 | 28 |
- Source: As of 28 September 2025
- Relatives: Michael Marum (nephew)

Skerry Palanga is a Papua New Guinean rugby league coach who coached Papua New Guinea during the 1980s and 1990s.

== Coaching career ==
Palanga first coached Papua New Guinea in 1982, in a match against the touring Kangaroo side. He took full time control of the side in 1988 and controlled the team in matches during the 1988 and 1989-1992 Rugby League World Cup.

== Personal life ==
Palanga is the uncle of Michael Marum who also coached the Papua New Guinea team.
