= Joe Gispe =

PNG international rugby league footballer

Personal information
- Born: Papua New Guinea

Playing information
- Position: Second-row
Representative
Years	Team	Pld	T	G	FG	P
1988–92	Papua New Guinea	12	0	0	0	0

Joe Gispe is a Papua New Guinean rugby league player who represented Papua New Guinea national rugby league team, including in the Rugby League World Cup matches.

== Playing career ==
Gispe played for the Air Niugini club in the Port Moresby Rugby League.

Gispe represented Papua New Guinea in twelve matches between 1988 and 1992.

His son, Brian Gispe, plays for the Rabaul Gurias.

Gispe started playing rugby league with Waghi Brothers club in Jiwaka before playing for Rabaul Tigers in the East New Britain league where herepresented the Islands Zone and moved onto Air Nigini club in Port Moresby. Played for Port Moresby Vipers in the Intercity Competition, the Kumuls and the President 13. Held onto the Kumuls second row position from 1988 to 1992. A solid ball and all defender with great following in his rugby days.
