= Max Tiri =

PNG international rugby league footballer

Personal information
- Born: Papua New Guinea

Playing information
- Position: Second-row
Club
Years	Team	Pld	T	G	FG	P
	Mt Hagen Eagles
Representative
Years	Team	Pld	T	G	FG	P
1990–96	Papua New Guinea	32	1	0	0	4

Max Tiri is a Papua New Guinean former professional rugby league footballer who represented Papua New Guinea at the 1995 World Cup.

== Playing career ==
Tiri played for the Mt Hagen Eagles and represented Papua New Guinea between 1990 and 1996. He captained Papua New Guinea and finished his career having played in 32 tests.

== Administration career ==
Tiri served as the Highlands region director and on the board of the Papua New Guinea Rugby Football League.
