= Carl Gibson =

GB international rugby league footballer

Personal information
- Born: 23 April 1963 (age 63) Batley, West Riding of Yorkshire, England

Playing information
- Position: Centre, Wing
Club
Years	Team	Pld	T	G	FG	P
1982–86	Batley	120	81	0	0	308
1986–93	Leeds	235	93	0	0	372
1993–96	Featherstone Rovers	97	37	1	0	150
1996–98	Batley	25	5	0	0	20
	Total	477	216	1	0	850
Representative
Years	Team	Pld	T	G	FG	P
1985–91	Great Britain	11	3	0	0	12
1985–91	Yorkshire	8	4	0	0	16

Carl Gibson (born 23 April 1963) is an English former professional rugby league footballer who played in the 1980s and 1990s. He played at representative level for Great Britain and Yorkshire, and at club level for Batley, Leeds and Featherstone Rovers, as a fullback, Wing, or centre. He attended Batley Boys High School.

== Playing career ==
=== Club career ===
Gibson started his professional career with his hometown club Batley, making his debut in April 1982 against Keighley.

During January 1986, Gibson transferred from Batley to Leeds for a fee of £50,000. Gibson set an enduring record for Leeds of 91 consecutive appearances for the club before a bout of food poisoning ended his run.

Gibson played as a substitute (replacing wing John Basnett) in Leeds' 14–15 defeat by St Helens in the 1987–88 John Player Special Trophy Final during the 1987–88 season at Central Park, Wigan on 9 January 1988.

Gibson played left wing and scored two tries in Leeds' 33–12 victory over Castleford in the 1988 Yorkshire Cup Final during the 1988–89 season at Elland Road, Leeds on 16 October 1988.

On Boxing Day 1992, Gibson suffered a broken leg in a league match against Castleford. Gibson missed the rest of the 1992–93 season as a result of the injury, and it would turn out to be his last appearance for the club, as he was sold to Featherstone Rovers in August 1993 for a fee of £15,000.

=== Representative honours ===
Gibson won caps for Great Britain in 1985 against France (sub), in 1990 against France, Papua New Guinea (2-games), New Zealand (3-games), and Australia (3-games), and in 1991 against France.

Gibson was selected for Yorkshire County XIII while at Batley during the 1985–86 season.
