= Sam Panapa =

New Zealand, Western Samoa & Tokelau international rugby league footballer

Personal information
- Full name: Samuel Lameko Panapa
- Born: 14 May 1963 (age 63) New Zealand

Playing information
- Position: Wing, Five-eighth
Club
Years	Team	Pld	T	G	FG	P
1983	Ponsonby Maritime
1984	Glenora Bears
1984–85	Sheffield Eagles	14	7	0	0	28
1985–90	Te Atatu	16	10	0	0	40
1990–91	Sheffield Eagles	24	14	0	0	56
1991–94	Wigan	119	45	0	0	180
1994–96	Salford	71	36	0	0	144
	Total	244	112	0	0	448
Representative
Years	Team	Pld	T	G	FG	P
1986–91	Auckland
1986	Tokelau
1990–91	New Zealand	8	6	0	0	24
1995	Western Samoa	2	0	0	0	0

Samuel Lameko Panapa is a New Zealand former professional rugby league footballer who played in the 1980s and 1990s. He represented three countries in his career: Tokelau, New Zealand and Western Samoa. Panapa played his club football in Auckland as well as England, where he won several titles with the champion Wigan side of the 1990s.

Panapa was born in Auckland to Tokelauan and Tuvaluan parents.

== Playing career ==
A Ponsonby Pony Junior and Ponsonby-Maritime Senior from 1969 - 1982, joined Glenora Bears in 1983 for two season before signing an off-season contract with UK club Sheffield Eagles 1984–5. Returning to NZ in 1985 signed with Te Atatu Roosters in the Auckland Rugby League competitions, He represented Tokelau at the 1986 Pacific Cup, and later for New Zealand. He returned to Britain in 1990 and played another season with Sheffield Eagles, before signing for Wigan in 1991.

During the 1991–92 Rugby Football League season, Panapa played for defending champions Wigan at centre in their 1991 World Club Challenge victory against the visiting Penrith Panthers, scoring his first try for the club. During the 1992–93 Rugby Football League season Panapa played from the interchange bench for defending RFL champions Wigan in the 1992 World Club Challenge defeat by the visiting Brisbane Broncos.

Sam Panapa played as a Substitute (replacing loose forward Phil Clarke on 9-minutes) in Wigan's 15–8 victory over Bradford Northern in the 1992–93 Regal Trophy Final during the 1992–93 season at Elland Road, Leeds on Saturday 23 January 1993, and played as a Substitute (replacing second-row Neil Cowie on 30-minutes) in the 2–33 defeat by Castleford in the 1993–94 Regal Trophy Final during the 1993–94 season at Elland Road, Leeds on Saturday 22 January 1994.

He played as substitute in both the 1993 and 1994 Challenge Cup finals victories against Widnes and Leeds at Wembley Stadium, scoring a try in each final. After the 1993–94 Rugby Football League season Panapa travelled with defending champions Wigan to Brisbane, playing at centre in their 1994 World Club Challenge victory over Australian premiers, the Brisbane Broncos.

Sam joined Salford in 1994–95 Rugby Football League season, and helped them attain Super League status following a Grand Final victory over Keighley Cougars at Old Trafford. Following that game Sam announced his retirement and returned to Auckland Warriors as Fitness Coach.

He played for Western Samoa at the 1995 Rugby League World Cup.

== Coaching career ==
Between 2006 and 2008 Panapa coached the Auckland side. In 2006 he was the Assistant Coach for the New Zealand Residents team.
