= Jeff Thomson =

Australian cricketer

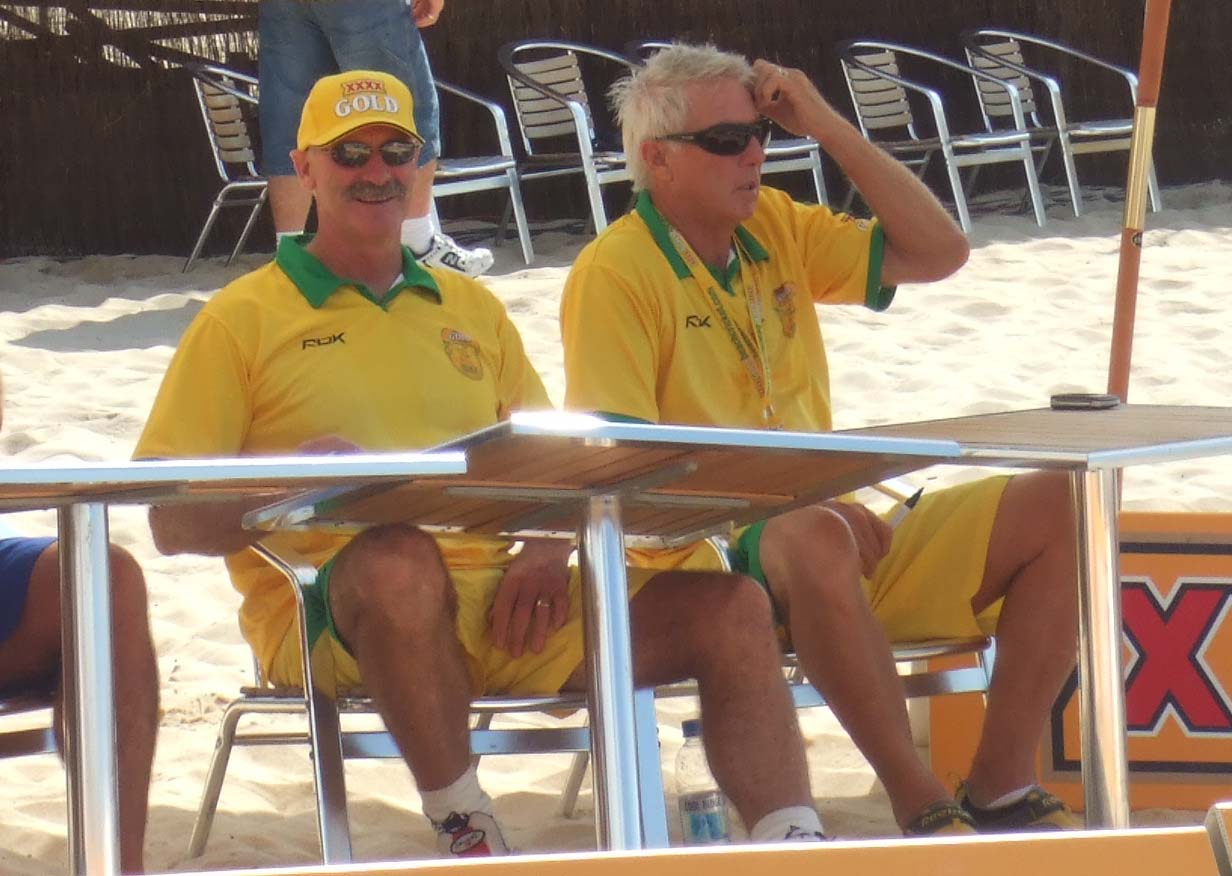
- Dennis Lillee (left) with Thomson

Personal information
- Full name: Jeffery Robert Thomson
- Born: 16 August 1950 (age 76); Greenacre, New South Wales, Australia
- Nickname: Thommo, Two-Up
- Batting: Right-handed
- Bowling: Right arm fast
- Role: Bowler

International information
- National side: Australia (1972–1985)
- Test debut (cap 262): 29 December 1972 v Pakistan
- Last Test: 20 August 1985 v England
- ODI debut (cap 28): 1 January 1975 v England
- Last ODI: 3 June 1985 v England

Domestic team information
- Years: Team
- 1972/73–1973/74: New South Wales
- 1974/75–1985/86: Queensland
- 1981: Middlesex

Career statistics
Competition	Test	ODI	FC	LA
Matches	51	50	187	88
Runs scored	679	181	2,065	280
Batting average	12.81	7.54	13.58	7.17
100s/50s	0/0	0/0	0/1	0/0
Top score	49	21	61	21
Balls bowled	10,535	2,696	33,318	4,529
Wickets	200	55	675	107
Bowling average	28.00	35.30	26.46	29.00
5 wickets in innings	8	0	28	1
10 wickets in match	0	0	3	0
Best bowling	6/46	4/67	7/27	7/22
Catches/stumpings	20/–	9/–	61/–	19/–
Medal record
Men's Cricket
Representing Australia
ICC Cricket World Cup
Runner-up	1975 England
- Source: Cricinfo, 4 November 2008

Jeffrey Robert Thomson (born 16 August 1950) is a former Australian cricketer. Known as "Thommo", he is one of the fastest bowlers in the history of cricket; he bowled a delivery with a speed of 160.6 km/h against the West Indies in Perth in 1975, which was the fastest recorded delivery at the time and the fourth-fastest recorded delivery of all time. He was a part of the Australian squad which finished as runners-up at the 1975 Cricket World Cup.

He was the opening partner of fellow fast bowler Dennis Lillee; their combination was one of the most fearsome in Test cricket history. Commenting on their bowling during the 1974–75 season, Wisden wrote: "... it was easy to believe they were the fastest pair ever to have coincided in a cricket team".

Another news reporter reported: "Dump a cricket ball in kerosene, light it on fire and launch it out of a cannon and then you'll get something like Jeff Thomson."

He was inducted into the Australian Cricket Hall of Fame in 2016.

== Speed and technique ==
Thomson had an unusual but highly effective slinging delivery action that he learned from his father. In December 1975, after the second Test match against the West Indies at the WACA, he was timed with a release speed of 160.45 km/h using accurate, high-speed photo-sonic cameras. The study was carried out by Tom Penrose and Brian Blanksby of the University of Western Australia, and Daryl Foster of the Secondary Teachers' College in Perth. Measurements were also made of three other fast bowlers, Dennis Lillee, Andy Roberts and Michael Holding. Thomson's fastest delivery was the quickest, with Roberts coming in at second place with a delivery measured at 150.67 km/h. In 1979, Thomson won a fastest-bowling competition held by the Australian television station Channel 9, the same year in which he was banned from playing professional cricket due to striking a soccer referee. His maximum speed was measured at 147.9 km/h using the same method as employed during the 1975 study at the WACA. (Incidentally, a follow-up study in 1976 put him at 160.6 km/h – he was the fastest of those tested in both studies.) He also won the accuracy prize in the competition. Four decades on, Thomson mentioned in an episode of Cricket Legends that he had intentionally bowled full tosses for the competition in order to improve his score. There was a $5,000 cash prize for the fastest bowler, and there was an additional $5,000 for the most accurate bowler (three points for the middle stump, and one point for either leg stump or off stump); Thomson scooped the entire $10,000 prize pool (approximately $50,000 in 2022 terms).

Thomson recalled:

If you bowl a bouncer, it's gonna come off slower anyway. So I'm thinking this is gonna be takin', you know, candy from a baby. And I've put my beer down, I come out, and I bowled a few balls – and I was bowling full tosses and that, because I knew they'd be quick. So I won the 5 grand, I hit the stumps three times out of six or whatever [in fact, the bowlers had 8 deliveries in total], and I've cleaned up. And I've come back out, and Kerry said: "How did you go?". I said, "I won, boss"; he said, "good".

Many critics who saw Thomson bowl rate him as one of the fastest they had seen, including Richie Benaud, who considered him the fastest since Frank Tyson. Australian wicket-keeper Rod Marsh kept wicket to Thomson for most of his Test career and has claimed that Thomson bowled upwards of 180 km/h, an opinion also held by fellow Australians Ian Chappell and Ashley Mallett. However, the fastest measured delivery as of 2022 was Shoaib Akhtar's delivery in of 161.3 km/h at the 2003 World Cup, making such a claim extremely unlikely (if not impossible) to have actually occurred. Many of the players of the 1970s and 1980s generation also rate Thomson as the fastest they faced, including West Indian Viv Richards and Sunil Gavaskar. Former West Indies captain Clive Lloyd regards Thomson as the fastest bowler he has ever seen, as does Michael Holding, himself an extremely fast bowler in his prime. Geoffrey Boycott rates Thomson joint-fastest with Holding, whilst Martin Crowe rated Thomson and Holding as the hardest bowlers to face, commenting: "Thomson was just a freak – a very unique action. You never really saw it."

Incidents were reported of Thomson delivering byes which hit the sight screen behind the facing batsman after just one bounce on the pitch. These reports were mostly from the time when he was at his very fastest – the period between 1972 and 1976 – though several instances are cited when this happened even after his injury, including up until the early 1980s. Thomson has said that one of his fastest spells was one against the West Indies in Barbados during World Series Cricket. After several West Indian bowlers had hit Australian batsmen, he has been quoted as saying he "wanted to return the favour". He also rates a spell against Victoria whilst playing for Queensland at the Gabba in Brisbane.

In the 1990s, Thomson was the bowling coach for Queensland. In 1992, after a practice session bowling in the nets to several of the Queensland batsmen, including Allan Border, Thomson was encouraged to play for the team, as, even at the age of 42, he was still faster than any of the Queensland bowlers. Only the youth policy of the team prevented him from rejoining the side to play competitively.

== Career ==
Thomson enjoyed a rapid rise in the 1972–73 season. He made his first-class debut for New South Wales (NSW) in October 1972 against Western Australia, replacing David Colley, who was injured.

He also took 5–97 for NSW Colts against Queensland Colts.

After playing five first-class games and taking 17 wickets, Thomson was a surprise selection in for the second Test against Pakistan. He replaced Bob Massie, who was picked in the first Test side. It was felt Thomson's selection was an experimental one with a view to the West Indies tour at the end of the summer. "I will try my guts out," said Thomson. "I was just hoping that I might pick up some more wickets in the forthcoming matches against Victoria so that they might think of me for the West Indies."

Against Pakistan at the MCG, Thomson returned match figures of 0/110. Later, he was diagnosed as having played with a broken bone in his foot, the pain from which he kept concealed from selectors and teammates. He bowled waywardly and was not picked to tour the West Indies.

Following this, he disappeared from first-class cricket until the final match of the 1973–74 season against Queensland. (However, he did bowl for NSW Colts over the summer.)

Thomson took nine wickets in the game, helping to prevent Queensland from winning the Shield. Queensland captain Greg Chappell convinced Thomson to move to Queensland for the following season, which he did, playing for Toombul District Cricket Club in the local Brisbane competition.

A graph showing Thomson's test career bowling statistics and how they varied over time

When Thomson was selected for the first Test of the 1974–75 Ashes series, the English players had seen him in action only once, during a tour match against Queensland when Thomson bowled well within himself on the instruction of his captain Greg Chappell. He created controversy during a television interview before the Test when he said, "I enjoy hitting a batsman more than getting him out. I like to see blood on the pitch". In the second innings of the match, he bowled Australia to victory with a spell of 6/46. At Perth, he injured several batsmen and finished off the game with 5/93 in the second innings as Australia recorded another victory.

During the 1974–75 Ashes series, Sydney newspaper The Sunday Telegraph ran a photo of Lillee and Thomson with a cartoon caption underneath that read:

Ashes to Ashes, dust to dust, if Thomson don't get ya, Lillee must.

Taking a relatively short run-up to the crease, Thomson generated his pace with a slinging-style bowling action, clearly influenced by his former competitive javelin throwing, that began to accelerate the ball from a lower position than is typical. He did not put a lot of work on the ball with his fingers, so he did not seam or swing the ball much, and he adopted an uncomplicated approach to his work. He once described his bowling as, "I just roll up and go whang". Although he regularly bowled the bouncer, it was his ability to make the ball rise sharply from a length that earned him many wickets. The hard Australian pitches suited his style as he relied on bounce rather than movement to take wickets. John Benaud describes facing Thomson in a Sydney grade match:

So Thommo begins – the high stepping gait of a thoroughbred, bowling hand bobbing at waist level and the ball visible. It is conventional and comforting because facing a strange bowler for the first time invariably generates edginess. Then, in the split second before delivery, at gather, Thommo drags one leg behind the other in a sort of Swan Lake crossover, sways back and hides the ball behind his right knee – unconventional and very unsettling.

Forming an intimidating bowling partnership with Dennis Lillee, Thomson captured 33 wickets in the series and looked to set to beat Arthur Mailey's record of 36 Test wickets in an Australian Test season. However, he injured his shoulder playing a social tennis match during the rest day of the Fifth Test at Adelaide and missed the rest of the summer. Australia's eventual winning margin was 4–1.

He was less at home on the slower wickets of England on the tour that followed in 1975, and took only four wickets in five matches during the inaugural World Cup. In the subsequent four-Test series, he snared 16 wickets at 28.56. In the first Test at Edgbaston, he hit 49 from 67 balls and bagged 5/38 in England's second innings as Australia claimed the only decisive result of the series, which enabled them to retain the Ashes. At this time, Thomson hired a manager, David Lord, who negotiated a contract with the Brisbane radio station 4IP, reputedly worth A$63,000 per year for ten years .

In the 1975–76 series against the West Indies, he took 29 wickets in the six Tests. He conceded a lot of runs but often induced the West Indies batsmen to play injudicious shots. Wisden thought his bowling had improved from the previous Australian season.

A severe injury resulted from an on-field collision with teammate Alan Turner as they both attempted a catch in the First Test match against Pakistan at Adelaide on Christmas Eve, 1976. A dislocation of his right collarbone forced him to miss the remainder of the season.

Although he returned to Test cricket during the 1977 Ashes series in England, he was never as consistently fast again. Lillee missed the tour because of back problems, and Thomson responded as the spearhead of the attack by taking 23 wickets at 25.34 average. Australia's performance was said to suffer by the revelation that most of the team had signed to play World Series Cricket (WSC) in opposition to official cricket, although skipper Greg Chappell concedes his side would have been beaten anyway.

Thomson's relationship with WSC was complex. He did not hesitate to sign on, but his manager pointed out that his contract with 4IP required him to be available for Queensland. Lord extricated him from the WSC contract (along with the West Indian Alvin Kallicharan), prompting Kerry Packer to obtain an injunction preventing Lord (or any other third party) from inducing players to break their WSC agreements.

In the rebuilt Australian Test team of 1977–78, Thomson was the senior player after the recalled veteran, captain Bob Simpson. In the First Test against India at Brisbane, Thomson contributed seven wickets and 41 not out towards an Australian victory. During the second Test at Perth, he claimed six wickets and finished the series with 22 wickets at an average of 23.45. Australia had a narrow 3–2 win that helped the ACB maintain its optimism that it could win the war with WSC. Thomson, meanwhile, had success at domestic level, taking 6/18 in his only Gillette Cup appearance, against South Australia in Brisbane, which was enough to be voted man-of-the-series, winning him a prize of two return tickets to Fiji.

Simpson lobbied for Thomson's appointment as vice-captain of the team to tour the West Indies. Thomson produced his fastest spell since his comeback in the second Test at Bridgetown, Barbados, when he knocked off Viv Richards' cap and finished with 6/77. However, his bowling fell away in the later Tests.

During the winter, Thomson expressed a desire to join his teammates playing WSC, which paid for a court challenge to his contract.

The ACB had a rare victory over WSC when the judge ruled against the proposed move, and criticised Thomson's business acumen.

Thomson played a single limited-overs match for Queensland, taking 6/18, and then in September "retired" from Test cricket from 30 September onwards. He said he would remain available for Sheffield Shield.

As part of the negotiations to end the dispute between the two organisations, the ACB agreed to let Thomson play in WSC's tour of the Caribbean in the spring of 1979. Reunited with Lillee, he returned 16 wickets in five "Supertests", including 5/78 at Trinidad.

The reunion of the partnership for Test cricket was less successful. A number of fast bowlers had enjoyed success for Australia during Thomson's absence from the team, yet the selectors were keen to see Lillee and Thomson attempt to reprise their success of the mid-1970s. However, Thomson managed only two Tests in 1979–80 when he was dropped. He played four ODIs in the first World Series Cup, but bowled erratically in two-day/night matches against England at the SCG that confirmed his unsuitability to limited-overs cricket. Thereafter, injuries contributed to his absence from the team.

Overlooked for the 1981 Ashes tour of England, he decided to spend the season with Middlesex in the hope that he might be needed as a late replacement in the Australian team, but he got injured.

Thomson reclaimed his place in 1981–82 when he played eight of the nine Tests against Pakistan and the West Indies (in Australia) and in New Zealand. His figures were pedestrian: 20 wickets at 36.4, with a best of 4/51. However, he found a regular place in the ODI team and took 19 wickets (at 27.42 average) in 13 matches during the World Series Cup.

On the tour of Pakistan later in the year, he took just three wickets in three Tests.

Dropped for the first Test at home against England, Thomson owed his recall to a knee injury suffered by Lillee. In the remaining four Tests, he enjoyed success in taking 22 wickets at 18.68. At times, he reached top pace, claiming 5/73 at Brisbane, and 5/50 at Sydney in the fifth Test, his last in Australia. His performance in the World Series Cup, 19 wickets in 13 matches with an RPO of 4.01, was his best in an ODI tournament.

Thomson played on the 1983 World Cup. Peter McFarline wrote he was "well past his prime and a bowler not suited to one day conditions. Should never have been selected."

Continuing with Queensland as captain, Thomson was chosen for the 1985 tour of England. The rebel tours to South Africa had stripped the Australian team of pace bowlers. In the first Test, his match figures were 2/174, and he was omitted until the Fifth Test, when he scored 28 not out in the first innings, his highest Test score since 1977. His only wicket was Graham Gooch, giving him 200 Test wickets.

Thomson never represented Australia again; he did, however, help Queensland reach the Sheffield Shield final in his last season of first-class cricket in 1985–86, but they missed out to NSW.

== Personal life ==
Prior to his marriage, Thomson's dashing good looks, skill, and strong physique made him "very much a cynosure of ladies’ eyes". His reputation as a ladies' man came to a head during the 1979 Cricket World Cup when he was greeted by Queen Elizabeth II, who Thomson claimed remarked: "So you're the chap who has been giving our girls a hard time." He added in 2015 that the "lady-in-waiting saw me two years ago in Canberra and she told me those exact words, 'word for word'."

Thomson married model Cheryl Wilson after they caught each other's eyes during a cricket game; they have been a couple for more than 40 years. The wedding flowers were supplied by the legendary fast bowler and florist Ray Lindwall.

Thomson bought a Ford Falcon Phase III GTHO for $23,000 in the late 1980s, which in modern times is in incredibly high demand with collectors and investors. Thomson sold his Phase III for A$1,030,000 in 2018; it still bears its original seat belts, carpets, spare tyre and log books. This demand is, in part, due to a small production run – only 300 were ever made, and it's believed that fewer than a third of these vehicles remain.

== See also ==
- List of Queensland first-class cricketers
