= Robert Rose (Australian sportsman) =

Australian sportsman (1952–1999)

Personal information
- Full name: Robert Peter Rose
- Born: 6 February 1952; Collingwood, Victoria
- Died: 12 May 1999 (aged 47); Melbourne, Victoria
- Batting: Right-handed
- Role: Batsman

Domestic team information
- Years: Team
- 1971/72–1973/74: Victoria

Career statistics
Competition	First-class	List A
Matches	19	1
Runs scored	981	30
Batting average	30.65	30.00
100s/50s	1/5	0/0
Top score	118*	30
Balls bowled	24	–
Wickets	0	–
Bowling average	–	–
5 wickets in innings	–	–
10 wickets in match	–	–
Best bowling	–	–
Catches/stumpings	12/–	0/–
- Source: CricketArchive, 26 December 2014

Robert Peter Rose (6 February 1952 – 12 May 1999) was an Australian sportsman who played Australian rules football in the VFL and first-class cricket during the 1970s. Following a car crash in 1974 he became a quadriplegic.

== Early years ==
Rose was born into a famous sporting family; his father Bob was a Copeland Trophy–winning footballer with, and coach of, Collingwood and a member of the Australian Football Hall of Fame, while his uncles Kevin, Ralph and Bill also played for Collingwood.

Robert went to school at Haileybury College from where he was recruited to the Collingwood Football Club.

== Football career ==
He made his VFL debut for Collingwood in the 1970 season and played four games that year. A utility, Rose established himself in the side in 1971 and appeared in 16 games to help the Magpies make the finals. He struggled to hold his place in the side the following year, and in 1973 crossed to Footscray.

== Cricket career ==
Rose was also a talented cricketer and played as a right-handed middle-order batsman for Victoria. He was a regular in their 1972/73 and 1973/74 Sheffield Shield teams; and, from 19 first-class games, managed 981 runs at 30.65.

His only century was an innings of 118 not out which he made in the first innings of a Shield game against Queensland at the Brisbane Cricket Ground, following it up with 88 in the second. Another career highlight was when he scored 67 against New Zealand, who were touring the country. He scored 94 in a 214-run partnership with Paul Sheahan in 1972–73.

In 1973–74, a season when the Test selectors were trialling several young players (such as Ian Davis), his name was mentioned as a Test prospect.

== Car crash ==
Rose was involved in a serious car crash on 14 February 1974 on the Western Highway about 70 kilometres west of Melbourne. He and two other passengers in his car were injured when the vehicle lost control in loose gravel. The crash left him a quadriplegic. At the time, he and his wife had a nine-month-old daughter.

He was a drinks waiter at the Gabba Test during the 1975–76 season to promote the National Paraplegic and Quadriplegic Games.

He died in May 1999 from complications following surgery to repair a twisted bowel. The Robert Rose Foundation, for Victorians with spinal cord injuries, was named in his honour.

== Robert Rose Cup ==
Since the 2000 AFL season, Collingwood and the Western Bulldogs have played annually for the Robert Rose Cup. The Cup was named in honour of Robert's contribution to sport as well as raise funds for the Robert Rose Foundation.

== Robert Rose Award ==
In the AFL, the Robert Rose Award has been awarded annually since 1991 to the most courageous player in the league. Glenn Archer holds the record in the AFL with six wins (intermittently between 1998 and 2006), while Chelsea Randall has won the award six times (in 2017, 2018, 2019, 2021, 2022 (S7) and 2024), the most of any player in the AFL Women's.
