= 1987 Eastern Suburbs Roosters season =

← 1986	1988 →

The 1987 Eastern Suburbs Roosters season was the 80th in the club's history. They competed in the NSWRL's 1987 Winfield Cup Premiership, finishing the regular season 2nd (out of 13), before competing in the play-offs and coming within one match of the grand final only to lose to the Canberra Raiders. The Roosters also competed in the 1987 National Panasonic Cup.

== Line-up ==
Russell Bartlett, Brian Battese, Wayne Challis, Paul Danes, David French, Trevor Gillmeister, Brendon Hall, Steve Hardy, Kevin Hastings, Peter Johnston, Glenn Leggott, Joe Lydon, Terry Matterson, Hugh McGahan Mike McLean, John Mackay, Tony Melrose, Steve Morris, Trevor Patterson, Wayne Portlock, Gary Prohm, Tony Rampling, John Richards, Ron Ryan, Craig Salvatori, Danny Shepherd, Kurt Sherlock, Robert Simpkins, David Smith, Laurie Spina, Brad Tassell, Brad Tessmann, John Thomas, John Tobin, David Trewhella, Mark Wheeler, Gary Wurth.

== Ladder ==
	Team	Pld	W	D	L	B	PF	PA	PD	Pts
1	Manly-Warringah	24	18	1	5	2	553	356	+197	41
2	Eastern Suburbs	24	15	1	8	2	390	353	+37	35
3	Canberra	24	15	0	9	2	441	325	+116	34
4	Balmain	24	14	1	9	2	469	349	+120	33
5	South Sydney	24	13	1	10	2	310	342	-32	31
6	Canterbury-Bankstown	24	13	0	11	2	353	316	+37	30
7	Parramatta	24	12	0	12	2	417	411	+6	28
8	Cronulla-Sutherland	24	11	1	12	2	390	433	-43	27
9	St. George	24	10	2	12	2	394	409	-15	26
10	North Sydney	24	11	0	13	2	368	401	-33	26
11	Illawarra	24	8	0	16	2	372	449	-77	20
12	Penrith	24	6	1	17	2	274	399	-125	17
13	Western Suburbs	24	5	2	17	2	339	527	-188	16

== Season summary ==
- Eastern Suburbs home ground was Henson Park.
- Eastern Suburbs were coached by Arthur Beetson.
- Rd.1 Bye
- Rd.2 Eastern Suburbs 14 (W. Portlock, W. Challis Tries; T. Melrose 3 Goals) def Illawarra 8 (P. Haddock Try; D. Carney 2 Goals) at Henson Park.
- Rd.3 Eastern Suburbs 5 ( T. Melrose 2 Goals; K Hastings Field Goal) def North Sydney 4 (J. McArthur 2 Goals) at North Sydney Oval. A tackle by Wayne Challis bringing down opposition winger, Steven Keir only inches short of the line in the dying minutes of their match helped Eastern Suburbs maintain their undefeated start to the season.
- Rd.4 saw Eastern Suburbs record their biggest win of the season, Eastern Suburbs 44 (W. Challis 3, S. Morris 2, G. Prohm, H. McGahan, T. Gillmeister Tries; T. Melrose 6 Goals) defeated St George 2 (B. Djura Goal) at the Sydney Cricket Ground. It was also Eastern Suburb biggest ever win over the St George club.
- Rd.5 Eastern Suburbs 21 (H. McGahn, T. Gillmeister, T. Melrose, L. Spina tries; T. Melrose 2 goals, W Portlock field goal) defeated Balmain Tigers 8 (W. Pearce try; R. Conlon 2 goals).

== Season Highlights ==
- David Smith was Eastern Suburbs leading point scorer with 88 points, coming from 5 tries and 35 goals while their leading try scorer was Steve Morris with 10.
- Eastern Suburbs biggest win of the season came in the 4th round match, played at the Sydney Cricket Ground, when they defeated St George 44 points to 2, with Roosters winger Wayne Challis scoring 3 tries. It was also the biggest ever loss the St George club suffered against East's. Though East's best win of the season came in their round 22 match at Henson Park, when they defeated that year's Premiers, Manly Sea Eagles 26 to 16.
- Representatives: Trevor Gillmeister(Queensland), Hugh McGahn(New Zealand), Gary Wurth(Sydney)
- Arthur Beetson was recognised as coach of the year.

Preceded by 1986	Season; 1987	Succeeded by 1988
