= Mick Stone =

Australian former rugby league referee

Personal information
- Full name: Michael Stone

Refereeing information
Years	Competition	Apps
1981–1989	New South Wales Rugby League	206
- Source: rugbyleagueproject.org

Michael Stone (born 5 July 1949) is an Australian former rugby league referee.

Stone began his refereeing career in the Western Suburbs Junior Rugby League in 1978. He was subsequently graded to referee in the New South Wales Rugby League (NSWRL), gaining his first first-grade match in 1981. Stone controlled 206 first-grade matches between 1981 and 1989. He then became a referees' coach from 1991 to 2008, being the coaching co-ordinator from 1992 to 1999.

In 1983, Stone was involved in an unusual series of events that saw three different referees required to control a first grade match between Easts and Canterbury-Bankstown. Stone was carried from the field with a leg injury after four minutes. The reserve-grade referee took over, but experienced cramps at halftime. The third-grade referee then finished the match.

In 1986, Stone was responsible for the quickest send-off in rugby league, having dismissed Canterbury-Bankstown Bulldogs player Peter Kelly for a head-high tackle in the first tackle of the match. In the same year, he refereed the first tryless grand final of the modern era, when Parramatta defeated Canterbury-Bankstown 4-2.

In game 2 of the 1988 State of Origin series, Stone enraged the local Brisbane crowd when he sent Wally Lewis to the sin-bin for five minutes. The crowd showered the ground with beer cans, and the match had to be stopped until order was restored and the ground was cleared of rubbish.

== Career highlights ==
- 1986 – City vs Country, Grand Final
- 1987 – World Cup, City vs Country Origin, State of Origin, PNG vs NZ, State of Origin Exhibition (USA), Grand Final
- 1988 – State of Origin, World Cup, Grand Final
- 1989 – City vs Country Origin, State of Origin

== Honours and awards ==
- 1989 - Life Membership of the NSW Rugby League Referees Association, Trophy for Outstanding Contribution to the NSWRLRA
- 2006 - Namesake of the Michael Stone Medal, awarded annually to the NSWRLRA member judged the "referee's referee"
