= 1987 NSWRL season =

Rugby league competition

1987 New South Wales Rugby League
- Teams: 13
- Premiers: Manly-Warringah (5th title)
- Minor premiers: Manly-Warringah (6th title)
- Matches played: 162
- Points scored: 5,294
- Total attendance: 1,658,354
- Top points scorer: Ross Conlon (196)
- Wooden spoon: Western Suburbs Magpies (14th spoon)
- Rothmans Medal: Peter Sterling
- Top try-scorer: Terry Lamb (16)

The 1987 NSWRL season was the 80th season of professional rugby league football in Australia. Thirteen clubs competed for the New South Wales Rugby League premiership's J J Giltinan Shield and Winfield Cup during the season, which culminated in the grand final between the Manly-Warringah Sea Eagles and the Canberra Raiders who were the first club ever from outside Sydney to appear in a premiership decider. This season, NSWRL teams also competed for the 1987 National Panasonic Cup.

== Season summary ==
This was to be the last season that the moniker "New South Wales Rugby League" would be actually correct, as the following season two teams from Queensland would be introduced, heralding a new era of interstate club participation in the Winfield Cup premiership (although the name would not be changed to the Australian Rugby League until 1995). This would also ultimately lead to the decline of the historic Brisbane Rugby League premiership of Queensland.

Twenty-six regular season rounds were played from February through to August, resulting in a top five of Manly, Easts, Canberra, Balmain and Souths who battled it out in the finals.

Parramatta's captain and halfback Peter Sterling made a clean sweep of the 1987 season's major awards, winning the Rothmans Medal and Dally M Award as well as being named Rugby League Week's player of the year.

Western Suburbs moved their homeground to Campbelltown's Orana Park for the season, moving away from their home at Lidcombe Oval.

1987 would be the last year in which the NSWRL used the Sydney Cricket Ground for regular weekly matches, including all finals and the grand final. From 1988 league headquarters would move next door to the SCG to the new 40,000 seat, A$68 million Sydney Football Stadium.

=== Teams ===
The lineup of clubs remained unchanged from the previous year, with thirteen contesting the premiership, including five Sydney-based foundation teams, another six from Sydney, one from greater New South Wales and one from the Australian Capital Territory, though technically the ACT club, while known as the Canberra Raiders, actually played their home games at the Seiffert Oval in Queanbeyan which is located on the NSW side of the ACT/NSW state border to the south of the city.

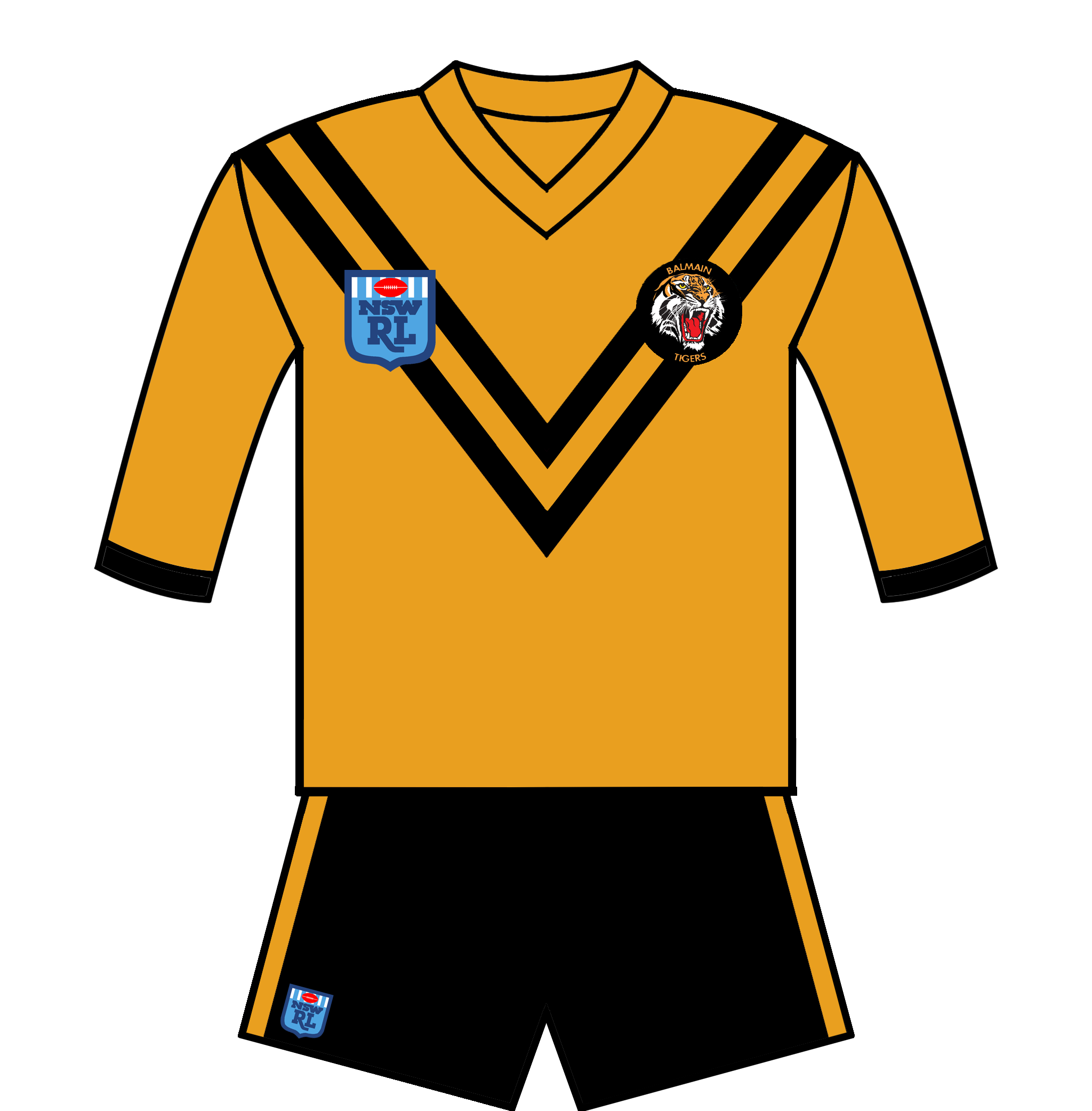
Balmain; Tigers 80th season Ground: Leichhardt Oval; Coach: Bill Anderson; Captain: Wayne Pearce

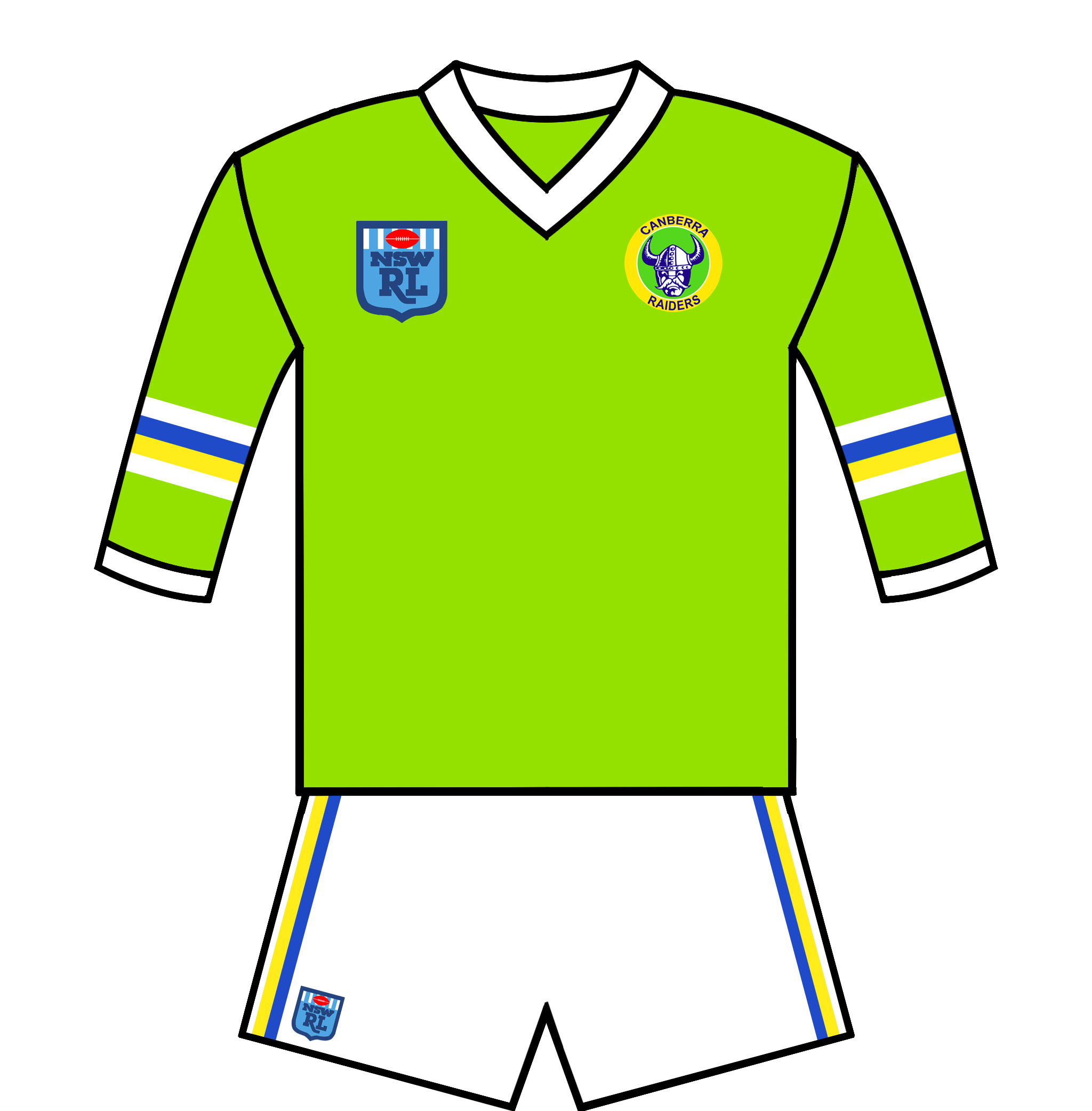
Canberra; Raiders 6th season Ground: Seiffert Oval; Coach: Don Furner & Wayne Bennett; Captain: Dean Lance

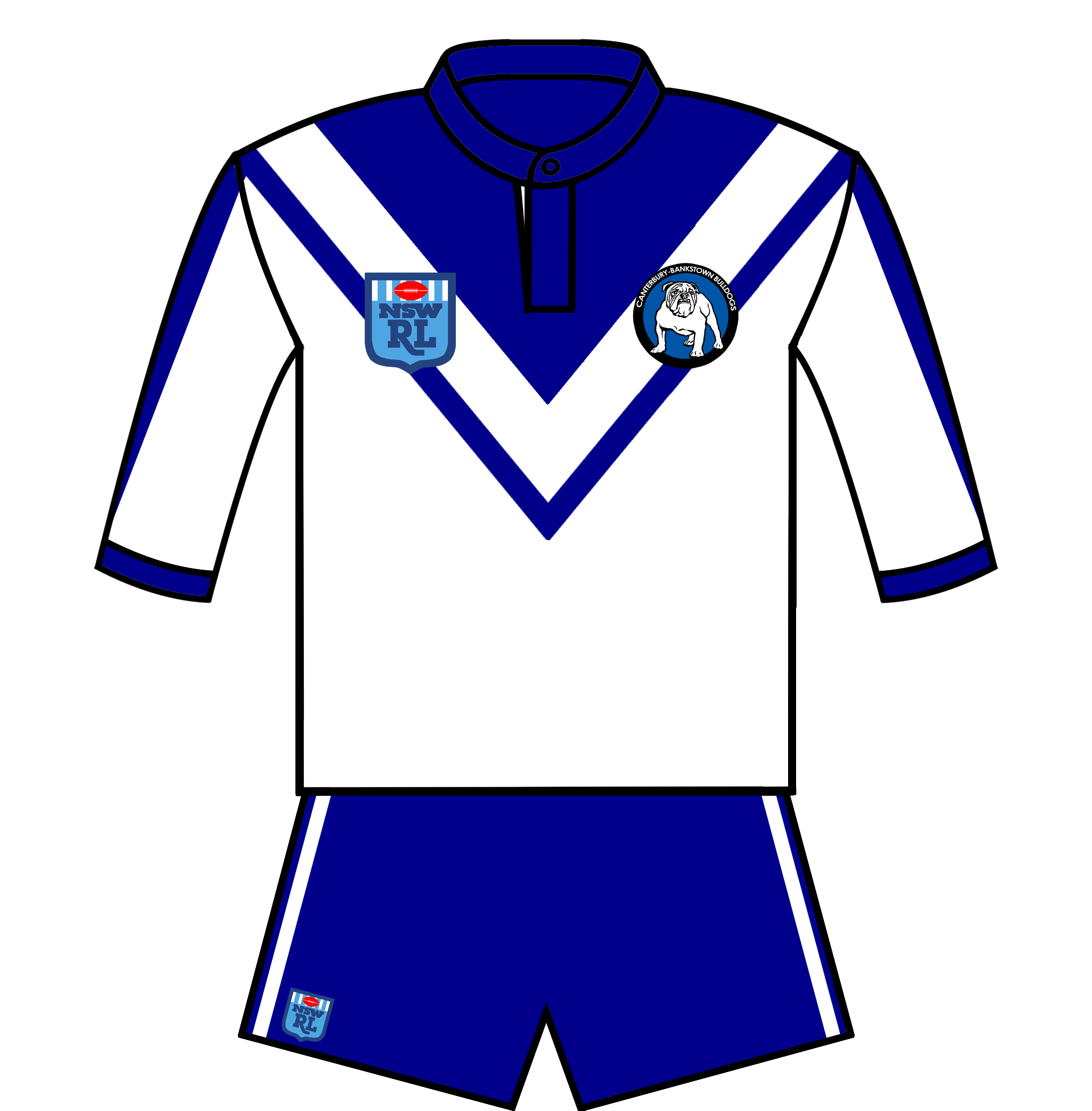
Canterbury-Bankstown; Bulldogs 53rd season Ground: Belmore Oval; Coach: Warren Ryan; Captain: Steve Mortimer

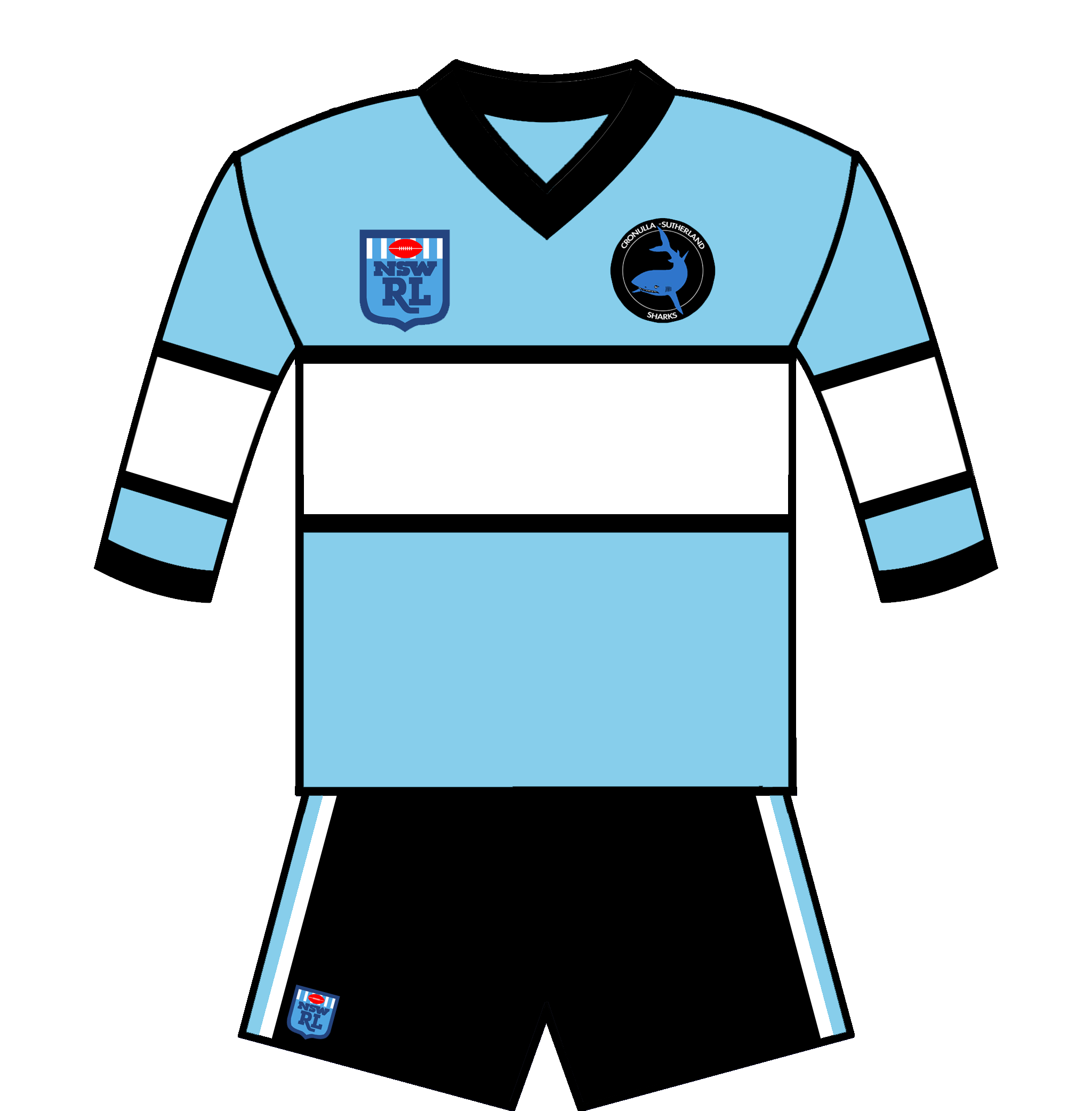
Cronulla-Sutherland; Sharks 21st season Ground: Caltex Field; Coach: Jack Gibson; Captain: David Hatch

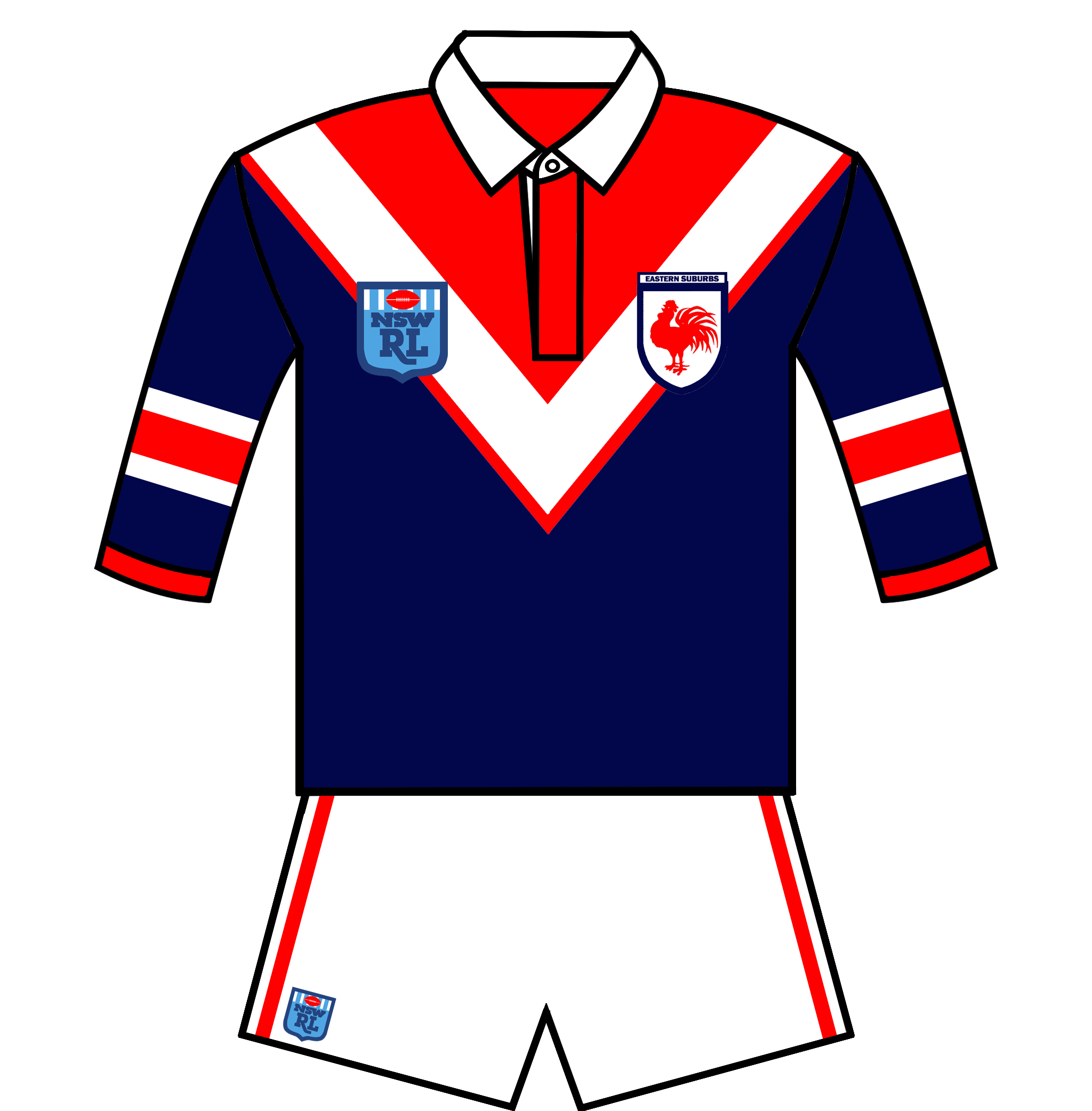
Eastern Suburbs; Roosters 80th season Ground: Henson Park; Coach: Arthur Beetson; Captain: Hugh McGahan

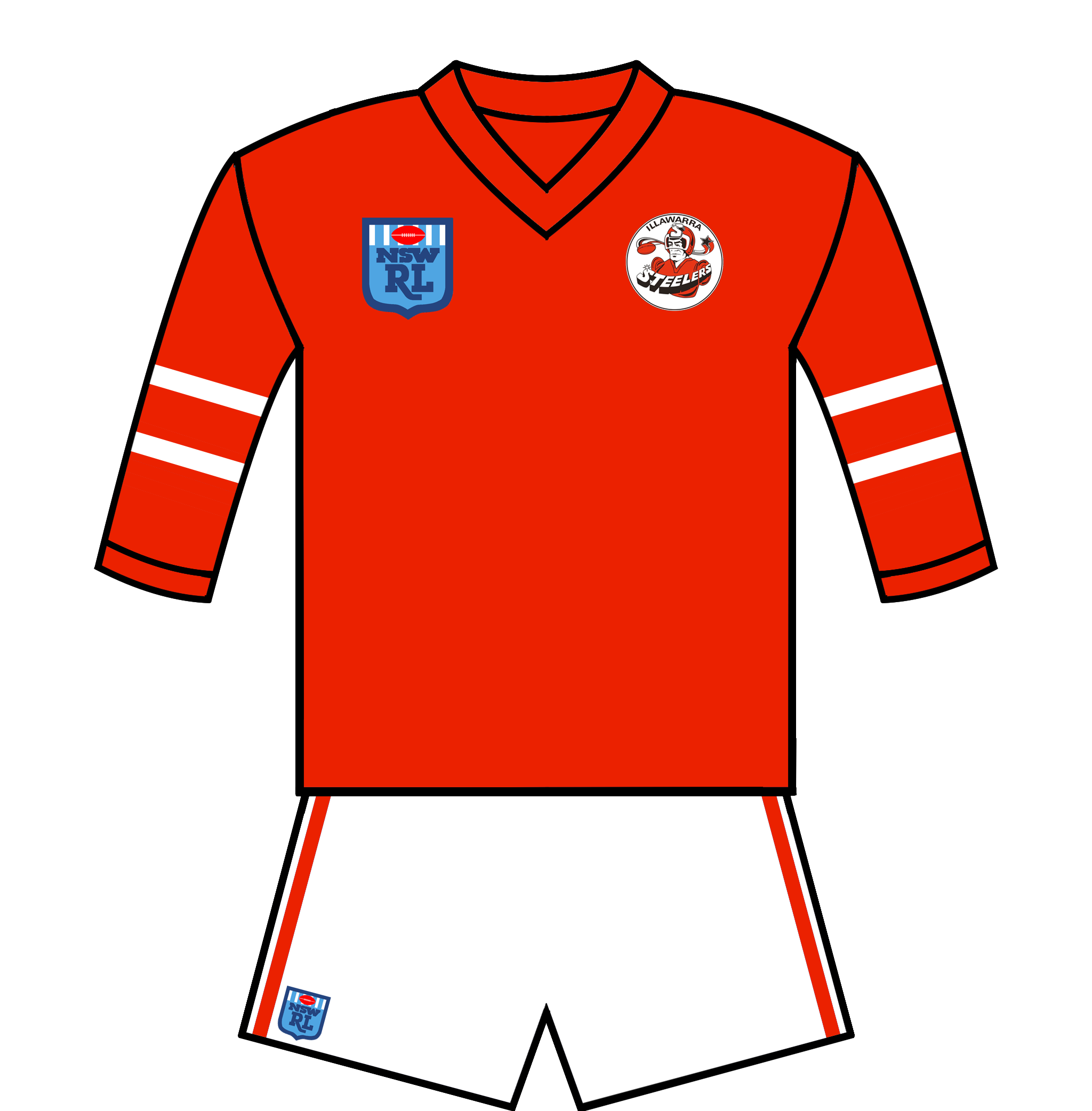
Illawarra; Steelers 6th season Ground: Wollongong Stadium; Coach: Brian Smith; Captain: Perry Haddock

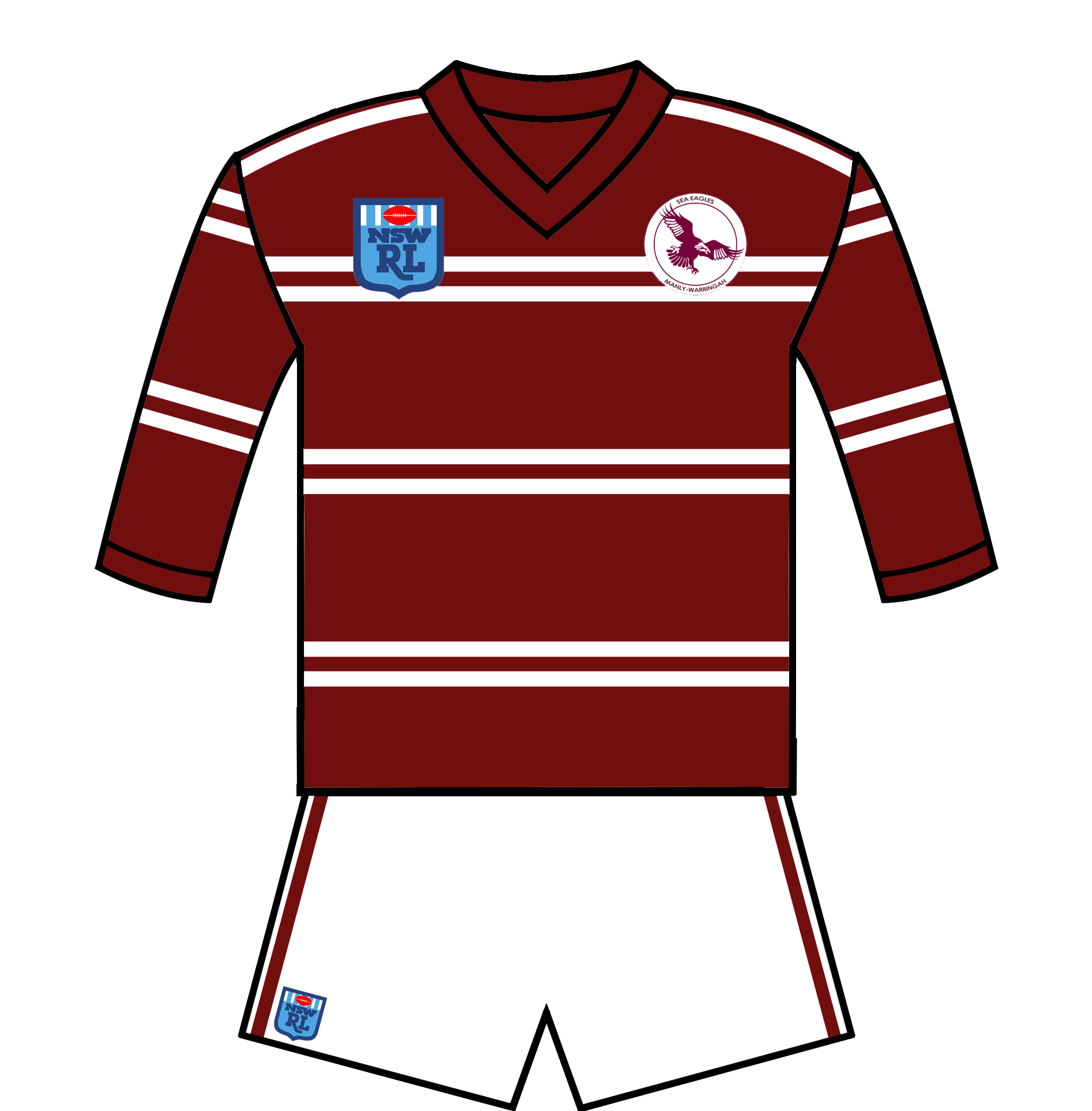
Manly-Warringah; Sea Eagles 41st season Ground: Brookvale Oval; Coach: Bob Fulton; Captain: Paul Vautin

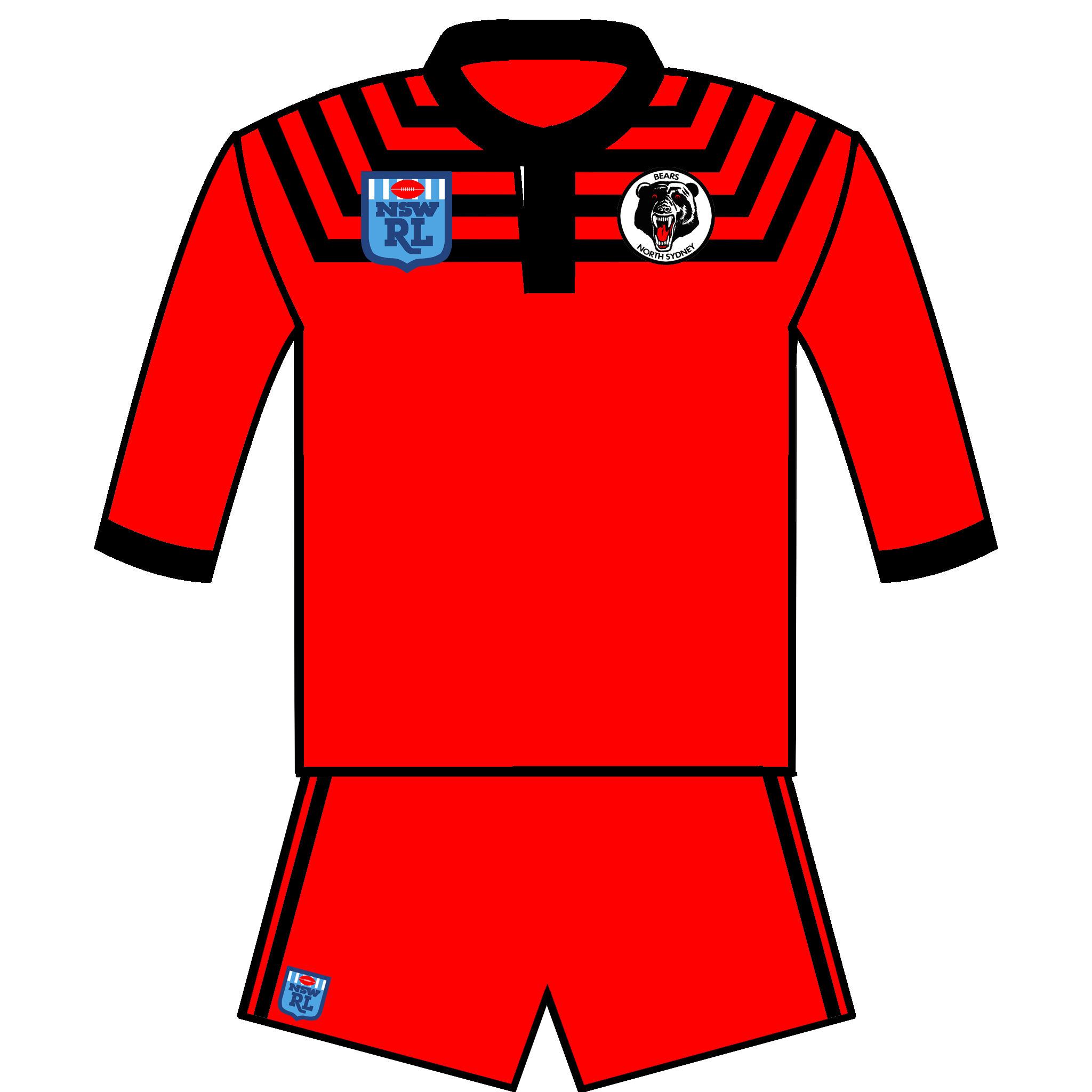
North Sydney; Bears 80th season Ground: North Sydney Oval; Coach: Frank Stanton; Captain: Mark Graham

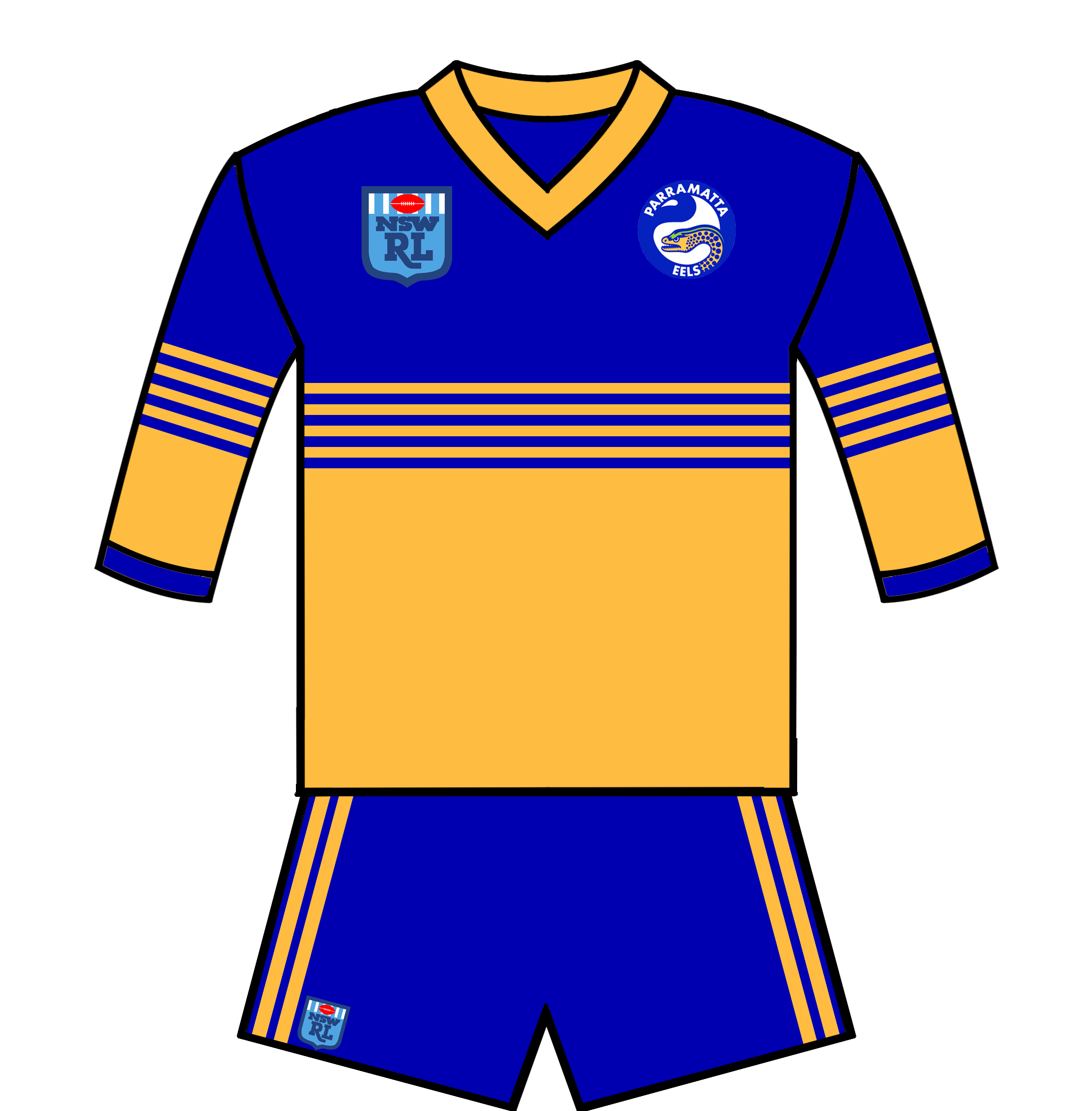
Parramatta; Eels 41st season Ground: Parramatta Stadium; Coach: John Monie; Captain: Peter Sterling

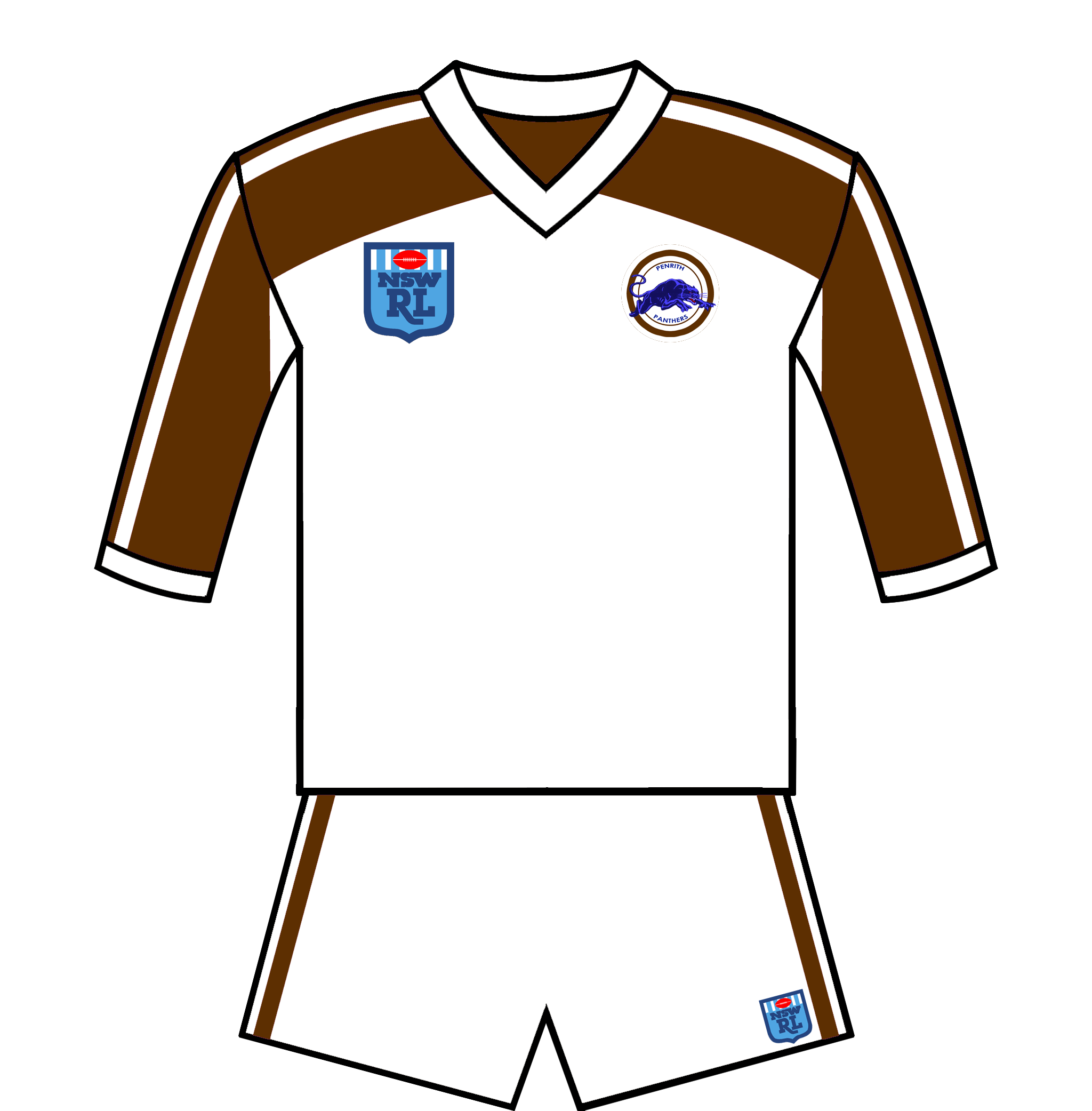
Penrith; Panthers 21st season Ground: Penrith Stadium; Coach: Tim Sheens; Captain: Royce Simmons

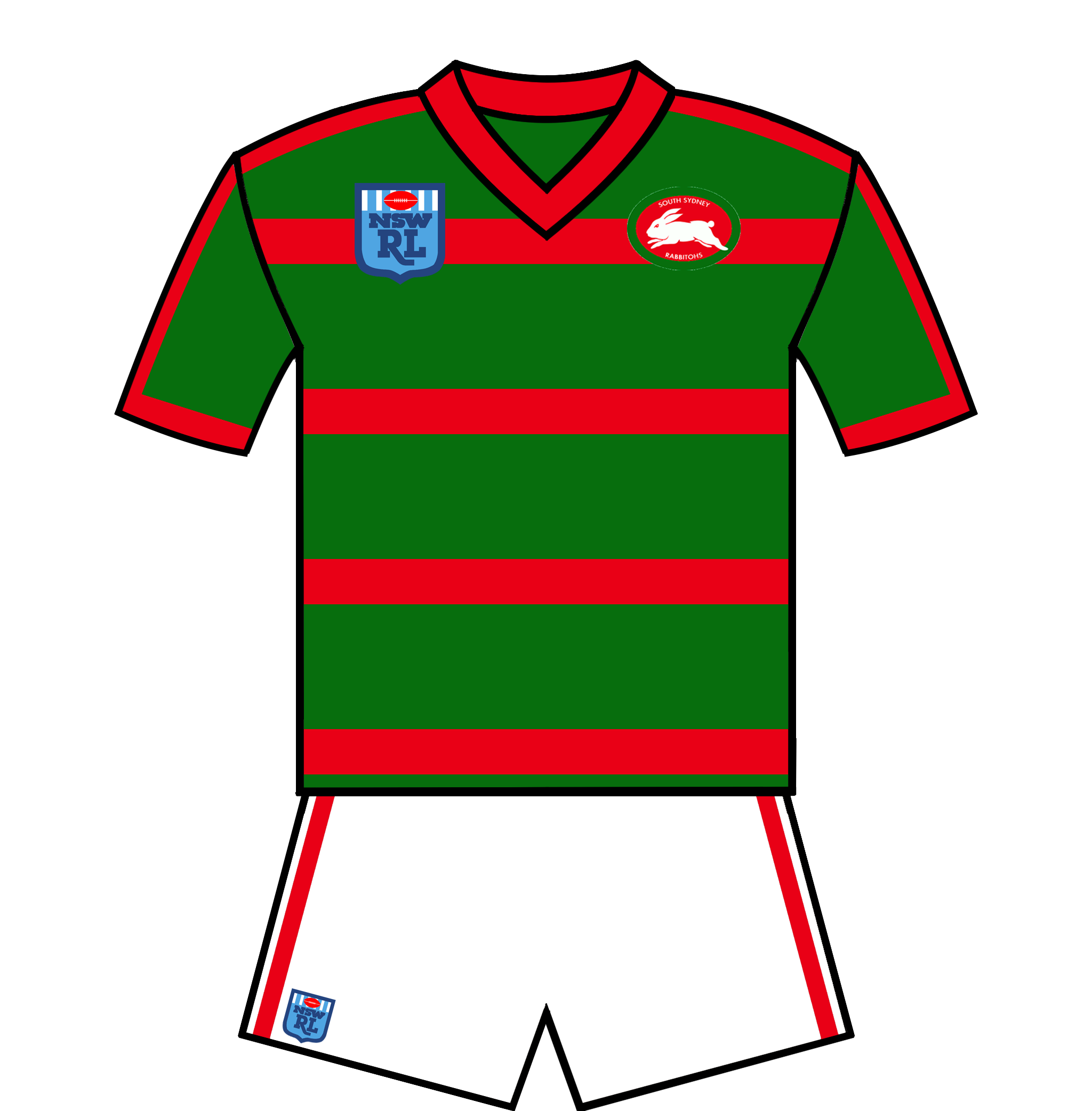
South Sydney; Rabbitohs 80th season Ground: Redfern Oval; Coach: George Piggins; Captain: Mario Fenech

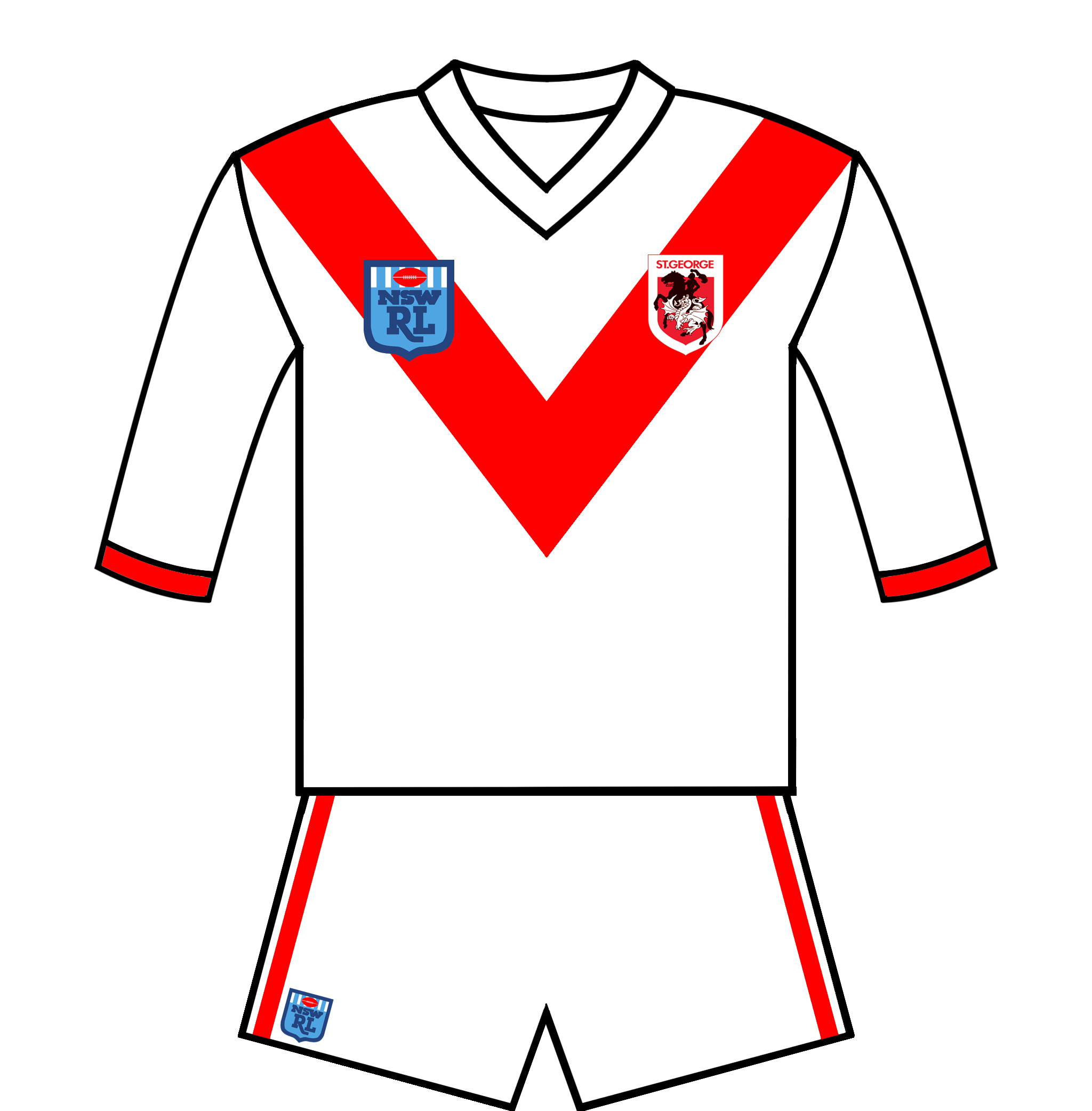
St. George; Dragons 67th season Ground: Sydney Cricket Ground; Coach: Roy Masters; Captain: Craig Young

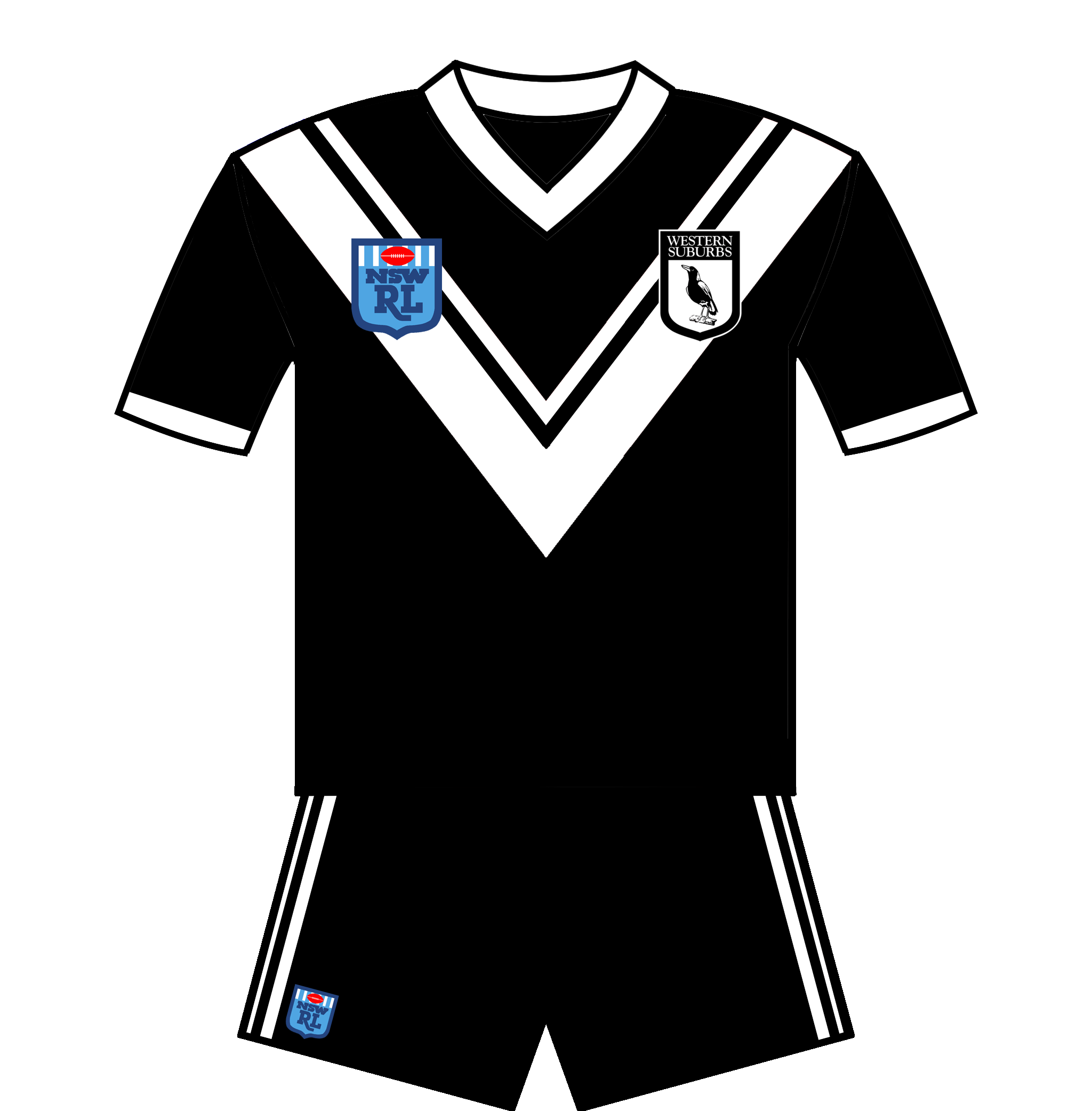
Western Suburbs; Magpies 80th season Ground: Orana Park; Coach Steve Ghosn; Captain: Ian Schubert

== Regular season ==
Team	1	2	3	4	5	6	7	8	9	10	11	12	13	14	15	16	17	18	19	20	21	22	23	24	25	26	F1	F2	F3	GF
Balmain Tigers	PAR +24	CBY +3	**SOU** **+32**	CRO +7	**EAS** **−13**	CAN +8	**ILA** **+21**	NOR +20	**STG** **+14**	X	PEN −6	**WES** **+4**	MAN −34	**PAR** **+19**	**CBY** **−3**	SOU −4	**CRO** **−6**	EAS; 0	**CAN** **+28**	**ILA** **+2**	**NOR** **+14**	STG −4	X	**PEN** **+16**	WES −4	**MAN** **−18**	**SOU** **−3**			
Canberra Raiders	**CRO** **+17**	X	ILA +13	**NOR** **−2**	STG +8	**BAL** **−8**	PEN +7	**WES** **+35**	PAR −8	**MAN** **−8**	CBY −19	**SOU** **+4**	**EAS** **−15**	CRO +26	X	**ILA** **+7**	NOR +6	**STG** **+17**	BAL −28	**PEN** **+18**	WES +18	**PAR** **−16**	MAN −2	**CBY** **+18**	SOU +24	EAS +4	EAS −9	SOU +34	EAS +8	MAN −10
Canterbury-Bankstown Bulldogs	**NOR** **+20**	**BAL** **−3**	PEN +6	**WES** **+10**	PAR −12	**MAN** **+12**	X	SOU −4	**CRO** **+16**	EAS −2	**CAN** **+19**	ILA −13	**STG** **−25**	NOR −6	BAL +3	**PEN** **+10**	WES +16	**PAR** **+16**	MAN −30	X	**SOU** **+2**	CRO +12	**EAS** **−2**	CAN −18	**ILA** **+12**	STG −2				
Cronulla-Sutherland Sharks	CAN −17	**NOR** **+6**	STG +8	**BAL** **−7**	PEN +2	**WES** **+12**	PAR +2	**MAN** **+5**	CBY −16	**SOU** **+10**	X	EAS −2	**ILA** **+20**	**CAN** **−26**	NOR −10	**STG** **−4**	BAL +6	**PEN** **+20**	WES; 0	**PAR** **+12**	MAN −22	**CBY** **−12**	SOU −6	X	**EAS** **−4**	ILA −20				
Eastern Suburbs Roosters	X	**ILA** **+6**	NOR +1	STG +42	BAL +13	PEN −11	WES −13	PAR +12	MAN −8	**CBY** **+2**	SOU −10	**CRO** **+2**	CAN +15	X	ILA +14	**NOR** **+1**	STG −7	**BAL**; **0**	PEN +1	**WES** **+9**	PAR −30	**MAN** **+10**	CBY +2	**SOU** **−14**	CRO +4	**CAN** **−4**	**CAN** **+9**	MAN −4	**CAN** **−8**	
Illawarra Steelers	SOU +23	EAS −6	**CAN** **−13**	X	NOR −14	**STG** **+4**	BAL −21	**PEN** **−10**	WES +20	**PAR** **+8**	MAN −10	**CBY** **+13**	CRO −20	**SOU** **−15**	**EAS** **−14**	CAN −7	X	**NOR** **+2**	STG −17	BAL −2	PEN −2	**WES** **+10**	PAR −3	**MAN** **−11**	CBY −12	**CRO** **+20**				
Manly Warringah Sea Eagles	STG; 0	**PEN** **+24**	WES +11	**PAR** **+22**	X	CBY −12	**SOU** **−10**	CRO −5	**EAS** **+8**	CAN +8	**ILA** **+10**	NOR +8	**BAL** **+34**	**STG** **+14**	PEN +2	**WES** **+1**	PAR +8	X	**CBY** **+30**	SOU +3	**CRO** **+22**	EAS −10	**CAN** **+2**	ILA +11	**NOR** **−2**	BAL +18	X	**EAS** **+4**	X	**CAN** **+10**
North Sydney Bears	CBY −20	CRO −6	**EAS** **−1**	CAN +2	**ILA** **+14**	X	**STG** **+2**	**BAL** **−20**	PEN −9	**WES** **−4**	PAR −7	**MAN** **−8**	SOU −4	**CBY** **+6**	**CRO** **+10**	EAS −1	**CAN** **−6**	ILA −2	X	**STG** **+3**	BAL −14	**PEN** **+3**	WES +2	**PAR** **+17**	MAN +2	**SOU** **+8**				
Parramatta Eels	**BAL** **−24**	WES −16	X	MAN −22	**CBY** **+12**	SOU +13	**CRO** **−2**	**EAS** **−12**	**CAN** **+8**	ILA −8	**NOR** **+7**	STG +1	**PEN** **+13**	BAL −19	**WES** **+19**	X	**MAN** **−8**	CBY −16	**SOU** **−4**	CRO −12	**EAS** **+30**	CAN +16	**ILA** **+3**	NOR −17	**STG** **+18**	PEN +26				
Penrith Panthers	**WES** **+10**	MAN −24	**CBY** **−6**	SOU −7	**CRO** **−2**	**EAS** **+11**	**CAN** **−7**	ILA +10	**NOR** **+9**	STG −8	**BAL** **+6**	X	PAR −13	WES −8	**MAN** **−2**	CBY −10	**SOU** **−2**	CRO −20	**EAS** **−1**	CAN −18	**ILA** **+2**	NOR −3	**STG**; **0**	BAL −16	X	**PAR** **−26**				
South Sydney Rabbitohs	**ILA** **−23**	**STG** **−5**	BAL −32	**PEN** **+7**	WES +3	**PAR** **−13**	MAN +10	**CBY** **+4**	X	CRO −10	**EAS** **+10**	CAN −4	**NOR** **+4**	ILA +15	STG +9	**BAL** **+4**	PEN +2	**WES**; **0**	PAR +4	**MAN** **−3**	CBY −2	X	**CRO** **+6**	EAS +14	**CAN** **−24**	NOR −8	BAL +3	**CAN** **−34**		
St. George Dragons	**MAN**; **0**	SOU +5	**CRO** **−8**	**EAS** **−42**	**CAN** **−8**	ILA −4	NOR −2	X	BAL −14	**PEN** **+8**	WES +34	**PAR** **−1**	CBY +25	MAN −14	**SOU** **−9**	CRO +4	**EAS** **+7**	CAN −17	**ILA** **+17**	NOR −3	X	**BAL** **+4**	PEN; 0	**WES** **+19**	PAR −18	**CBY** **+2**				
Western Suburbs Magpies	PEN −10	**PAR** **+16**	**MAN** **−11**	CBY −10	**SOU** **−3**	CRO −12	**EAS** **+13**	CAN −35	**ILA** **−20**	NOR +4	**STG** **−34**	BAL −4	X	**PEN** **+8**	PAR −19	MAN −1	**CBY** **−16**	SOU; 0	**CRO**; **0**	EAS −9	**CAN** **−18**	ILA −10	**NOR** **−2**	STG −19	**BAL** **+4**	X				
Team	1	2	3	4	5	6	7	8	9	10	11	12	13	14	15	16	17	18	19	20	21	22	23	24	25	26	F1	F2	F3	GF
**Bold** – Home game X – Bye Opponent for round listed above margin

=== Ladder ===
Pos	Team	Pld	W	D	L	B	PF	PA	PD	Pts
1	**Manly (P)**	24	18	1	5	2	553	356	+197	41
2	Eastern Suburbs	24	15	1	8	2	390	353	+37	35
3	Canberra	24	15	0	9	2	441	325	+116	34
4	Balmain	24	14	1	9	2	469	349	+120	33
5	South Sydney	24	13	1	10	2	310	342	-32	31
6	Canterbury	24	13	0	11	2	353	316	+37	30
7	Parramatta	24	12	0	12	2	417	411	+6	28
8	Cronulla	24	11	1	12	2	390	433	-43	27
9	St.George	24	10	2	12	2	394	409	-15	26
10	North Sydney	24	11	0	13	2	368	401	-33	26
11	Illawarra	24	8	0	16	2	372	449	-77	20
12	Penrith	24	6	1	17	2	274	399	-125	17
13	Western Suburbs	24	5	2	17	2	339	527	-188	16

=== Ladder progression ===
- Numbers highlighted in green indicate that the team finished the round inside the top 5.
- Numbers highlighted in blue indicates the team finished first on the ladder in that round.
- Numbers highlighted in red indicates the team finished last place on the ladder in that round.
- Underlined numbers indicate that the team had a bye during that round.

	Team	1	2	3	4	5	6	7	8	9	10	11	12	13	14	15	16	17	18	19	20	21	22	23	24	25	26
1	Manly Warringah Sea Eagles	1	3	5	7	9	9	9	9	11	13	15	17	19	21	23	25	27	29	31	33	35	35	37	39	39	41
2	Eastern Suburbs Roosters	2	4	6	8	10	10	10	12	12	14	14	16	18	20	22	24	24	25	27	29	29	31	33	33	35	35
3	Canberra Raiders	2	4	6	6	8	8	10	12	12	12	12	14	14	16	18	20	22	24	24	26	28	28	28	30	32	34
4	Balmain Tigers	2	4	6	8	8	10	12	14	16	18	18	20	20	22	22	22	22	23	25	27	29	29	31	33	33	33
5	South Sydney Rabbitohs	0	0	0	2	4	4	6	8	10	10	12	12	14	16	18	20	22	23	25	25	25	27	29	31	31	31
6	Canterbury-Bankstown Bulldogs	2	2	4	6	6	8	10	10	12	12	14	14	14	14	16	18	20	22	22	24	26	28	28	28	30	30
7	Parramatta Eels	0	0	2	2	4	6	6	6	8	8	10	12	14	14	16	18	18	18	18	18	20	22	24	24	26	28
8	Cronulla-Sutherland Sharks	0	2	4	4	6	8	10	12	12	14	16	16	18	18	18	18	20	22	23	25	25	25	25	27	27	27
9	St. George Dragons	1	3	3	3	3	3	3	5	5	7	9	9	11	11	11	13	15	15	17	17	19	21	22	24	24	26
10	North Sydney Bears	0	0	0	2	4	6	8	8	8	8	8	8	8	10	12	12	12	12	14	16	16	18	20	22	24	26
11	Illawarra Steelers	2	2	2	4	4	6	6	6	8	10	10	12	12	12	12	12	14	16	16	16	16	18	18	18	18	20
12	Penrith Panthers	2	2	2	2	2	4	4	6	8	8	10	12	12	12	12	12	12	12	12	12	14	14	15	15	17	17
13	Western Suburbs Magpies	0	2	2	2	2	2	4	4	4	6	6	6	8	10	10	10	10	11	12	12	12	12	12	12	14	16

== Finals ==
Home	Score	Away	Match Information
Home	Score	Away	Date and Time	Venue	Referee	Crowd
Qualifying Finals
Balmain Tigers	12–15	South Sydney Rabbitohs	5 September 1987	Sydney Cricket Ground	Greg McCallum	22,134
Eastern Suburbs Roosters	25–16	Canberra Raiders	6 September 1987	Sydney Cricket Ground	Mick Stone	15,852
Semi-finals
Canberra Raiders	46–12	South Sydney Rabbitohs	12 September 1987	Sydney Cricket Ground	Mick Stone	24,744
Manly-Warringah Sea Eagles	10–6	Eastern Suburbs Roosters	13 September 1987	Sydney Cricket Ground	Greg McCallum	36,399
Preliminary final
Eastern Suburbs Roosters	24–32	Canberra Raiders	20 September 1987	Sydney Cricket Ground	Mick Stone	26,790
Grand final
Manly-Warringah Sea Eagles	18–8	Canberra Raiders	27 September 1987	Sydney Cricket Ground	Mick Stone	50,201

=== Chart ===
Qualifying final
2	Eastern Suburbs	25
3	Canberra	16
4	Balmain	12
5	South Sydney	15

Major semi-final
1	Manly	10
Eastern Suburbs	6
Minor semi-final
Canberra	46
South Sydney	12

Preliminary final
Eastern Suburbs	24
Canberra	32

Grand final
Manly	18
Canberra	8

== Grand final ==
1987 NSWRL Grand Final

Manly Warringah Sea Eagles	Canberra Raiders
18	8
	1	2	Total
MAN	6	12	18
CAN	0	8	8
- Date: 27 September 1987
- Stadium: Sydney Cricket Ground
- Location: Moore Park, New South Wales
- Clive Churchill Medal: Cliff Lyons (MAN)
- National anthem: Julie Anthony
- Referee: Mick Stone
- Attendance: 50,201

Broadcast partners
- Broadcasters: Network 10; ABC
- Commentators: Tim Webster (10 Host); Rex Mossop (10); Graeme Hughes (10); David Fordham (10); Peter Sterling (10) Wayne Pearce (10) Bill Anderson (10) David Morrow (ABC Host) Hugh McGahan (ABC) Warren Boland (ABC)

=== Background ===
Manly dominated the 1987 season with a 12-match winning sequence between May and July, with the result that Bob Fulton's elusive goal of coaching a team to grand final victory began to look a possibility. The path to glory had been four years in the making. In 1983, Fulton returned to the Sea Eagles as coach, but Manly lost to Parramatta for the second year running that, so he set about pursuing a stable of players capable of winning a premiership.

50,201 fans were on hand during an unseasonable southeastern Australian heatwave, with the temperature peaking at 31.1 °C or 88.0 °F, to watch the last NSWRL grand final at the Sydney Cricket Ground, and the first to involve a club from outside the Sydney area.

Network 10 televised a memorable pre-match entertainment themed to commence celebrations of New South Wales' 200th birthday. The ceremony involving a symbolic building of a huge model of the Sydney Harbour Bridge by representatives of the Navy's apprentices, while singer John Williamson performed his song "True Blue". There were repeated playing of the Bicentennial jingle "making this State great." Australian soprano Julie Anthony sang Advance Australia Fair before kickoff.

Ten's commentary team for the game was Rex Mossop and Graeme Hughes with David Fordham the sideline reporter and special comments from Australian and New South Wales representatives Peter Sterling and Wayne Pearce. Ten personality Tim Webster was the grand final's Master of Ceremonies, hosting the pre-game coin toss and the post match presentation ceremonies. Balmain's outgoing coach Bill Anderson joined Fordham for the call of both the U/23's grand final (won 34–14 by St George over Souths) and the reserve grade grand final won 11–0 by Penrith over minor premier Manly.

The ABC's telecast of the game was hosted by chief caller David Morrow who was joined in the commentary booth for special comments by Easts and NZ Test captain Hugh McGahan with Warren Boland providing sideline commentary. Peter Longman did reports from the Queanbeyan League's Club in Canberra while Peter Wilkins did the reports from the Manly Leagues Club in Brookvale.

=== Teams ===
The sole survivors of the Manly's 1983 loss to Parramatta were Noel Cleal and club captain, Paul Vautin. Vautin had been largely overlooked by the Australian selectors (including being surprisingly overlooked for the 1982 Kangaroo tour after representing both Australia and Queensland earlier that year). Vautin's leadership of the Sea-Eagles was an integral factor in the club's success, though there was allegedly tension between Vautin and Cleal in 1987. Despite still recovering from broken arm suffered on the successful 1986 Kangaroo tour, the Manly club board had wanted Fulton to make Cleal the captain to replace Vautin. Fulton however retained Vautin as captain with Cleal as his deputy. In 1984 young halfback Des Hasler, who had spent several seasons warming the bench at Penrith trialed with the club and became a mainstay of the Manly side having achieved Test selection against New Zealand in 1985 as well as being a 1986 Kangaroo Tourist. 1986 Rothmans medallist, winger-turned-hooker, Mal Cochrane, a reliable goalkicker and a deceptive open runner was also an asset to the side. The forwards were Vautin, "Crusher" Cleal, "Rambo" Ron Gibbs, Kangaroo Tour prop Phil Daley and Great Britain international, Castleford's Kevin Ward, who was flown back out to Australia specifically for the grand final. Manly's masterstroke was the signing of former rugby union international centre Michael O'Connor from St. George who was the current NSW Origin and Australian test goal kicker.

Their opponents were to be the Canberra Raiders who, after five years of competition, had reached their first grand final. The Raiders were co-coached by Kangaroos coach Don Furner and Queensland coach Wayne Bennett who had jointly won the Dally M Coach of the Year award for their efforts in lifting the Raiders from easy beats to premiership contenders. The team included players such as captain Dean Lance, Queensland and Kangaroo Tour fullback Gary Belcher, centres Mal Meninga (himself a test veteran who had returned after breaking his arm against Manly earlier in the year) and Peter Jackson, hooker Steve Walters and front rowers Sam Backo and New Zealand test player (and former NZ Water Polo international) Brent Todd with a young Kevin Walters also on the bench. Also sitting on the Raiders bench for the game as emergencies were young Glenn Lazarus and Laurie Daley, though neither would be used in the match.

Team details
Manly Warringah Sea Eagles		Position	Canberra Raiders
Name	Number	Position	Number	Name
Dale Shearer	1	Fullback	1	Gary Belcher
David Ronson	2	Wing	2	Chris Kinna
Darrell Williams	3	Centre	3	Mal Meninga
Michael O'Connor	4	Centre	4	Peter Jackson
Stuart Davis	5	Wing	5	Matthew Corkery
Cliff Lyons	6	Five eighth	6	Chris O'Sullivan
Des Hasler	7	Half back	7	Ivan Henjak
Phil Daley	13	Prop forward	13	Brent Todd
Mal Cochrane	12	Hooker	12	Steve Walters
Kevin Ward	11	Prop forward	11	Sam Backo
Ron Gibbs	10	Second row	10	Gary Coyne
Noel Cleal	9	Second row	9	Ashley Gilbert
Paul Vautin (c)	8	Lock forward	8	Dean Lance (c)
Paul Shaw	20	Replacement	20	Kevin Walters
Mark Pocock	24	Replacement	16	Terry Regan
Bob Fulton		Coach		Don Furner and Wayne Bennett
RLP

=== Match summary ===
==== First half ====
From the outset Manly's Cliff Lyons attempted to find gaps out wide in Canberra's defence and kept the Raiders hemmed in on their own side of half-way with his astute kicking. Lyons stepped inside the Raiders' defence and after a seventy-metre burst found Noel Cleal stampeding on to the ball but Cleal's final pass to Des Hasler was ruled forward. Another promising Manly raid broke down after Lyons had initially dummied to O'Connor, then proceeded to run around Peter Jackson and head 30 metres downfield. It all came to naught however when Lyons' reverse pass to O'Connor was put to ground after O'Connor had thought Lyons would dummy to him again. TV replays showed that Lyons would have had an unimpeded run to the try line by the posts had he looked ahead instead of trying to pass back inside.

Manly continued to put pressure on the Raiders defence with both speedsters Michael O'Connor and Dale Shearer trying to catch the Raiders out with long range kicks to their in-goal area in front of the SCG hill, but both were only just beaten to the ball each time by Gary Belcher and Gary Coyne respectively.

In the 27th minute Lyons eventually broke through on his third threatening attempt. Scurrying from a scrum win on the Canberra quarter-line, Lyons brushed off the tackle of Chris O'Sullivan and stepped inside Belcher to score.

Just before half time, Ron Gibbs was sent to the head bin for a brief period, replaced by Paul Shaw.

The Sea Eagles led 6-0 at half-time, with a ball-and-all tackle by Belcher on Dale Shearer just two metres from the Canberra tryline preventing the lead being greater.

==== Second half ====
From the restart kick-off by O'Connor, Sam Backo missed the ball when trying to trap it with his foot just in front and to the left of the posts. Subsequently this forced Belcher to field the ball deep in his in-goal, but he was penalised for shepherding behind first Backo and then Chris O'Sullivan who was standing under the posts as he ran the ball out. And with the Manly line arriving as Belcher was behind O'Sullivan, referee Stone ruled the Canberra fullback had used his team mate as a shepherd with Vautin the player ruled to have been impeded. It was a gift penalty for O'Connor to take Manly out to an 8-0 lead.

The Sea Eagles kept the pressure on Canberra by charging down two attempted clearing kicks by a tiring Mal Meninga. Only occasionally did the Raiders break through. After a run by Peter Jackson, Manly's Phil Daley was penalised for a high tackle and Meninga's goal finally put Canberra on the scoreboard.

Fatigue and the heat began to take a toll on the players, though one of the more surprising efforts was Manly's English prop Kevin Ward who ran and tackled strongly all day. Meninga, who had only played 60 minutes of football since breaking his arm in a game against Manly almost two months earlier, was replaced by Kevin Walters after 15 minutes of the second half and Manly's Gibbs, Cleal and Cochrane all went down hurt at different stages as the pace of the match slowed (for his part, Cochrane still can't remember the second half). Soon after a successful penalty goal from O'Connor, a Dale Shearer cross field kick from the Raiders 22m line was grounded over the line by O'Connor in the Paddington corner. While Manly winger David Ronson was thought to be offside (though he didn't get involved in the play, he was still within 10 metres of O'Connor), many claim that the Manly centre should have been ruled offside as he got the ball "rather quickly" (television replays would prove inconclusive as there was no footage of where O'Conner was when Shearer kicked). However, referee Mick Stone ruled that Manly's international centre was onside and O'Connor was awarded the try. He converted his own try (giving him 4/4 goals at that point) and Manly had a premiership winning 16-2 lead.

A brief hope of a fightback loomed after an ingeniously constructed "trojan horse" move by Canberra. Chris O'Sullivan went down "injured" after being tackled and then miraculously popped up in the next passage of play to take the inside pass from Ivan Henjak and score. With Meninga off the ground, Gary Belcher converted to narrow the scores to 16-8.

Ron Gibbs' return from the head-bin helped snap the Sea Eagles out of their complacency. Daley's tackle on Canberra replacement Terry Regan and Dale Shearer's try-saving tackle on Ashley Gilbert three minutes from full-time ended any chance of a Canberra fightback. Paul Vautin led the charge back up-field with Hasler being bundled into the corner post after a run-around movement with O'Connor. The Manly centre also had a try taken off him just minutes after his previous try when Mick Stone ruled a pass from Cliff Lyons had gone forward.

Right on full-time, O'Connor landed his fifth goal from five attempts after the Raiders were penalised in front of their own posts for being offside after a tap-kick restart. The 18-8 scoreline was a fair indication of Manly's supremacy on the day and a just result considering the Sea Eagles' consistency throughout the year. Manly captain Paul Vautin said on the presentation dias "Canberra almost produced a fairytale finish, but unfortunately the last couple of pages were ripped out... we were the best team today and we had been all year."

Manly became the first team other than Canterbury-Bankstown or Parramatta to win the premiership during the 1980s (Manly had been beaten grand finalists in 1982 and 1983, losing both times to Parramatta). Manly centre Darrell Williams also became the first ever New Zealander to win the Sydney premiership while Vautin remains as of 2024 the only Queenslander to captain the Sea Eagles to a premiership win.

Bob Fulton won his first premiership as a coach following a nine-year tenure. The game marked the conclusion of Don Furner's club coaching career, having overseen Canberra's entry into the league. Co-coach Wayne Bennett subsequently departed to coach the Brisbane Broncos while continuing his role with the Queensland State of Origin team.

=== Scoreboard ===
1987 NSWRL Winfield Cup Grand Final

Sunday, 27 September
15:00 AEST (UTC+10)

Manly Warringah Sea Eagles	18 – 8	Canberra Raiders
Tries: 2 Lyons 27'; O'Connor 54'; Goals: 5 O'Connor 27', pen 41', pen 51', 55', pen 78' (5/5)	1st: 6–0; 2nd: 12–8; Report	Tries: 1 O'Sullivan 69'; Goals: 2 Meninga pen 46' (1/1); Belcher 70' (1/1)

Sydney Cricket Ground
Attendance: 50,201
Referee: Mick Stone
Clive Churchill Medal: Cliff Lyons (Manly)

== World Club Challenge ==
Having won the premiership, the Manly side travelled to England to play British Champions Wigan on 7 October. This was only the second match of its kind, being the first time the Australian and British premiers faced off since 1976. 36,895 spectators turned out at Central Park in Wigan, to see the Sea Eagles go down 8–2 in a tryless game which saw Ron Gibbs sent off in his last game for Manly following a high tackle on Wigan centre Joe Lydon.

== Player statistics ==
The following statistics are as of the conclusion of Round 26.

Top 5 point scorers

Points	Player	Tries	Goals	Field goals
184	Ross Conlon	5	82	0
179	Terry Lamb	16	57	1
162	Dean Carney	8	64	2
138	Mal Cochrane	5	59	0
108	John Muggleton	4	45	2

Top 5 try scorers

Tries	Player
16	Terry Lamb
13	Dale Shearer
13	Matthew Corkery
13	Brian Johnston
11	Scott Gale

Top 5 goal scorers

Goals	Player
82	Ross Conlon
64	Dean Carney
59	Mal Cochrane
57	Terry Lamb
45	John Muggleton
45	Ian Schubert
