= Terry Regan (rugby league) =

Australian rugby league footballer

Personal information
- Full name: Terry Regan
- Born: 21 May 1957 (age 69) Griffith, New South Wales, Australia

Playing information
- Position: Prop, Second-row
Club
Years	Team	Pld	T	G	FG	P
	Cessnock
1982	Balmain Tigers	19	4	0	0	12
1983–84	Eastern Suburbs	31	1	0	0	4
1985–87	Canberra Raiders	32	4	0	0	16
1987–88	Hull FC	25	1	0	0	4
	Total	107	10	0	0	36
Representative
Years	Team	Pld	T	G	FG	P
1981	Country NSW	1	0	0	0	0

Terry Regan (born 21 May 1958) is an Australian former professional rugby league footballer who played in the 1980s. He was New South Wales Country Rugby League Player of the Year in 1981. Regan was a forward with a reputation as a hard-playing, head-on tackler. He also played in England with Hull FC.

== Playing career ==
Regan began his rugby league career playing for Cessnock under coach Garry Johns. In 1981, Regan was named Country Rugby League Player of the Year and was selected to represent Country in the annual City-Country clash. Although playing on the losing side, Regan's efforts in that match gained the attention of the Balmain Tigers in the New South Wales Rugby League competition, the premier competition of the time. He was given a contract for the 1982 season where he played nineteen games in first-grade but also won a reserve-grade grand-final title.

Regan was offered a contract with Eastern Suburbs for the following season. In his two seasons at Easts, Regan was sent from the field on three occasions for tackling infringements.

In 1985, Regan moved to the Canberra Raiders where he was a member of the club's first semi-finals and then the first grand-final appearance in 1987. Regan played in the last twenty minutes of the grand-final, a game lost to Manly-Warringah 18–8. In 1986, Regan took up boxing, losing on points over three rounds to Steve Marolt.

== Post-playing ==
After retiring from playing, Regan coached Hillston in the Group 17 competition. He later assisted his wife in training racehorses on the New South Wales Central Coast.
