= Joshua Kouoru =

Rugby league footballer

Personal information
- Born: 1 September 1968 Koialahu, Ihu, Papua New Guinea
- Died: 12 January 2024 (aged 55) Port Moresby, Papua New Guinea

Playing information
- Position: Wing
Representative
Years	Team	Pld	T	G	FG	P
1991–95	Papua New Guinea	9	1	0	0	4

Joshua Kouoru (1 September 1968 – 12 January 2024) was a Papua New Guinean rugby league footballer who played as a winger. He represented Papua New Guinea at the 1995 Rugby League World Cup.

== Biography ==
Kouoru was born on 1 September 1968 in Koialahu, a village in the Gulf Province of Papua New Guinea. Along with his elder brothers, Gideon and Haoda, he began playing rugby league for his local village team.

Kouoru debuted for the Papua New Guinea national team in 1991, and was selected for the 1991 Kumuls tour. He also represented the team at the 1995 Rugby League World Cup.

After retiring as a player, he remained involved in the sport off the field, helping with the development of rugby league in his home province, and was one of the founding members of the Gulf Isou franchise club.

Kouoru died on 12 January 2024, aged 55. He was survived by his wife, Moru, and five children.
