= Bill Anderson (Australian coach) =

Australian cricket and rugby league coach (born 1948)

Personal information
- Full name: William Charles Anderson
- Born: 10 April 1948 (age 77); Glebe, NSW, Australia

Coaching information
Club
Years	Team	Gms	W	D	L	W%
1980–82	South Sydney	71	34	3	34	48
1987	Balmain	25	14	1	10	56
	Total	96	48	4	44	50
Representative
Years	Team	Gms	W	D	L	W%
1988	NSW City	1	1	0	0	100

William Charles Anderson PSM (born 10 April 1948) is an Australian former cricket and rugby league coach.

Born and raised in the Sydney suburb of Glebe, Anderson's main sporting pedigree was in cricket and while attending Fort Street High School he captained the NSW Combined High Schools XI. He played in Sydney 1st grade cricket for Petersham-Marrickville, scoring four centuries. His 648 runs in 1974/75 contributed to the club winning the premiership and he finished only behind Bob Simpson in the competition's player of the season award.

As a junior rugby league player with Newtown, Anderson served his rugby league coaching apprenticeship under Jack Gibson, first at Eastern Suburbs where he was appointed coach of the club's Under-23s team. Under his guidance the team won the premiership in 1976, defeating Canterbury-Bankstown 20–5.

In 1978 he followed Gibson to South Sydney, eventually succeeding his mentor as Rabbitohs head coach in 1980. He guided South Sydney to the finals during his maiden season and remained in charge for two further campaigns, which included Souths winning the final of the 1981 Tooth Cup 10–2 against Cronulla under his coaching.

After resigning as Souths coach, Anderson returned to cricket coaching at Petersham-Marrickville then served as an assistant with the Bob Simpson-coached NSW cricket team, which he helped win the 1985–86 Sheffield Shield title before becoming head coach for a season in 1986–87. Returning to rugby league in 1987, Anderson coached Balmain to a fifth-place finish, after they were eliminated from the finals by his former club South Sydney. Repeating his efforts at Souths, Balmain won the 1987 National Panasonic Cup final 14–12 against Penrith. In 1988, Anderson was appointed representative head coach of the City team for the annual City vs Country Origin match.

He was replaced at Balmain by Warren Ryan in 1988 and coached NSW City that year to a win over NSW Country.

In addition to coaching, Anderson was also involved in radio and television commentary during the 1980s and 1990s, including a period with Network 10 where he was a commentator with Ray Warren and Graeme Hughes.

When Network 10 lost the rugby league broadcast rights, Anderson returned to the NSW Department of Education rising to the role of Director of Specialist Programs. For his service as an educator and executive producer of the annual "School Spectacular" he was later honoured in the 2014 Queen's Birthday Honours list with a Public Service Medal for his "public service to education in New South Wales". Following his retirement from the Department of Education in 2015, Anderson maintained his ties to cricket at the Randwick-Petersham Cricket Club.

One of his coaching proteges in grade cricket was Usman Khawaja and he ended up working as the Test batsman's manager.

In 2023, Anderson received a Distinguished Long Service Award at the NSW Community Sports Awards for his dedicated service to cricket.
