= List of Papua New Guinea national rugby league team results =

The following list is a complete collection of test results and competitive non-test results for the Papua New Guinea national rugby league team.

== All-time Record ==
Below is the list of Papua New Guinea's international head-to-head record as of 22 October 2026.

Country	Matches	Won	Drawn	Lost	Win percentage	For	Aga	Diff
Australia	10	0	0	10	0%	62	528	–466
Australian Aboriginies	3	0	0	3	0%	40	118	–78
Cook Islands	9	9	0	0	100%	352	142	+210
England	5	0	0	5	0%	56	190	–134
Fiji	17	12	0	5	70.59%	425	279	+146
France	14	4	1	9	28.57%	249	281	–32
Great Britain	9	2	0	7	22.22%	146	298	–152
Ireland	1	1	0	0	100%	14	6	+8
Lebanon	1	1	0	0	100%	42	18	+24
New Zealand	19	1	0	18	5.26	238	866	–628
(Māori people) New Zealand Maori	12	2	0	10	16.67%	269	396	–127
New Zealand Residents	2	0	0	2	0%	24	42	–18
Samoa	3	0	0	3	0%	28	88	–60
Scotland	1	1	0	0	100%	38	20	+18
South Africa	1	1	0	0	100%	16	0	+16
Tonga	9	7	1	1	77.78%	322	179	+143
United States	1	1	0	0	100%	64	0	+64
Wales	5	2	0	3	40.00%	104	146	–42
Total	122	44	2	76	36.07%	2,489	3,597	–1,108

Notes:

- The tally for matches against Tonga includes a 1990 match between Papua New Guinea and the Friendly Islands.

== Results ==
=== 1970s ===
Date	Home	Score	Away	Competition	Location	Attendance
4 May 1975	Papua New Guinea	15–41	New Zealand Māori	1975 Pacific Cup	(Papua New Guinea) Lloyd Robson Oval, Port Moresby	Unknown
6 May 1975	Papua New Guinea	15–13	Western Australia	1975 Pacific Cup	(Papua New Guinea) Lloyd Robson Oval, Port Moresby	Unknown
9 May 1975	Papua New Guinea	38–0	(Victoria (state)) Victoria	1975 Pacific Cup	(Papua New Guinea) Lloyd Robson Oval, Port Moresby	Unknown
11 May 1975	New Zealand Māori	38–13	Papua New Guinea	1975 Pacific Cup	(Papua New Guinea) Lloyd Robson Oval, Port Moresby	Unknown
6 July 1975	Papua New Guinea	12–40	England	Friendly	(Papua New Guinea) Lloyd Robson Oval, Port Moresby	12,000
29 May 1977	Papua New Guinea	37–6	France	1977 Les Chanticleers World Cup tour	(Papua New Guinea) Lloyd Robson Oval, Port Moresby	14,000
14 September 1977	Western Australia	33–9	Papua New Guinea	1977 Pacific Cup	(New Zealand) Davies Park, Huntly	Unknown
17 September 1977	New Zealand Māori	25–17	Papua New Guinea	1977 Pacific Cup	(Tonga) Rotorua International Stadium, Rotorua	Unknown
18 September 1977	Papua New Guinea	46–14	Northern Territory	1977 Pacific Cup	(New Zealand) Tokoroa	Unknown
21 September 1977	Papua New Guinea	42–12	(Victoria (state)) Victoria	1977 Pacific Cup	(New Zealand) Davies Park, Huntly	Unknown
30 July 1978	Papua New Guinea	21–30	New Zealand	1978 Kiwi tour	(Papua New Guinea) Lloyd Robson Oval, Port Moresby	11,541
14 October 1979	France	16–9	Papua New Guinea	1979 Kumuls tour	(France) Stadium Municipal d'Albi, Albi	4,500
28 October 1979	France	15–2	Papua New Guinea	1979 Kumuls tour	(France) Stade Albert Domec, Carcassonne	3,500

=== 1980s ===
Date	Home	Score	Away	Competition	Location	Attendance
23 August 1981	Papua New Guinea	13–13	France	1981 Les Chanticleers tour	(Papua New Guinea) Lloyd Robson Oval, Port Moresby	14,500
25 July 1982	Papua New Guinea	56–5	New Zealand	1982 Kiwi tour	(Papua New Guinea) Lloyd Robson Oval, Port Moresby	13,000
2 October 1982	Papua New Guinea	2–38	Australia	1982 Kangaroo tour	(Papua New Guinea) Lloyd Robson Oval, Port Moresby	15,000
2 October 1983	New Zealand	56–5	Papua New Guinea	Friendly	(New Zealand) Carlaw Park, Auckland	7,000
5 August 1984	Papua New Guinea	20–38	Great Britain	1984 Lions tour	(Papua New Guinea) Kagamuga Oval, Mount Hagen	7,510
10 August 1986	Papua New Guinea	26–36	New Zealand	1986 Kiwi tour	(Papua New Guinea) Danny Leahy Oval, Goroka	11,000
17 August 1986	Papua New Guinea	24–22	New Zealand	1985–1988 World Cup	(Papua New Guinea) Lloyd Robson Oval, Port Moresby	15,000
4 October 1986	Papua New Guinea	2–62	Australia	1985–1988 World Cup	(Papua New Guinea) Lloyd Robson Oval, Port Moresby	17,000
12 July 1987	Papua New Guinea	22–36	New Zealand	1987 Kiwi tour	(Papua New Guinea) Lloyd Robson Oval, Port Moresby	15,000
24 October 1987	Great Britain	42–0	Papua New Guinea	1985–1988 World Cup	(United Kingdom) Central Park, Wigan	9,121
15 November 1987	France	21–4	Papua New Guinea	1985–1988 World Cup	(France) Stade Albert Domec, Carcassonne	5,000
22 May 1988	Papua New Guinea	22–42	Great Britain	1985–1988 World Cup	(Papua New Guinea) Lloyd Robson Oval, Port Moresby	12,107
10 July 1988	New Zealand	14–66	Papua New Guinea	1985–1988 World Cup	(New Zealand) Carlaw Park, Auckland	8,392
20 July 1988	Australia	70–8	Papua New Guinea	1985–1988 World Cup	(Australia) Eric Weissel Oval, Wagga Wagga	11,685

=== 1990s ===
Date	Home	Score	Away	Competition	Location	Attendance
27 May 1990	Papua New Guinea	20–18	Great Britain	1990 Lions tour	(Papua New Guinea) Danny Leahy Oval, Goroka	12,000
2 June 1990	Papua New Guinea	8–40	Great Britain	1989–1992 World Cup	(Papua New Guinea) Lloyd Robson Oval, Port Moresby	7,837
5 August 1990	Papua New Guinea	4–36	New Zealand	Friendly	(Papua New Guinea) Danny Leahy Oval, Goroka	12,000
21 October 1990	Papua New Guinea	16–14	Tonga Residents	1990 Pacific Cup	(Tonga) Nukuʻalofa	Unknown
24 October 1990	Māori	46–14	Papua New Guinea	1990 Pacific Cup	(Tonga) Nukuʻalofa	Unknown
26 October 1990	Australian Aborigines	28–18	Papua New Guinea	1990 Pacific Cup	(Tonga) Nukuʻalofa	Unknown
7 July 1991	Papua New Guinea	18–20	France	1989–1992 World Cup	(Papua New Guinea) Danny Leahy Oval, Goroka	11,485
6 October 1991	Papua New Guinea	2–58	Australia	1991 Kangaroo tour	(Papua New Guinea) Danny Leahy Oval, Goroka	13,000
13 October 1991	Papua New Guinea	6–40	Australia	1989–1992 World Cup	(Papua New Guinea) Lloyd Robson Oval, Port Moresby	14,500
27 October 1991	Wales	68–0	Papua New Guinea	1991 Kumuls tour	(Wales) Vetch Field, Swansea	11,422
9 November 1991	Great Britain	56–4	Papua New Guinea	1989–1992 World Cup (1991 Kumuls tour)	(United Kingdom) Central Park, Wigan	4,193
24 November 1991	France	28–14	Papua New Guinea	1989–1992 World Cup (1991 Kumuls tour)	(France) Stade d'Albert Domec, Carcassonne	1,440
31 May 1992	Papua New Guinea	14–20	Great Britain	1992 Lions tour	(Papua New Guinea) Lloyd Robson Oval, Port Moresby	7,294
5 July 1992	New Zealand	56–10	Papua New Guinea	1989–1992 World Cup	(New Zealand) Mount Smart Stadium, Auckland	3,000
15 July 1992	Australia	36–14	Papua New Guinea	1989–1992 World Cup	(Australia) Townsville Sports Reserve, Townsville	12,470
19 June 1993	Papua New Guinea	35–24	Fiji	Friendly	(Papua New Guinea) Lloyd Robson Oval, Port Moresby	Unknown
26 June 1994	Papua New Guinea	29–22	France	1994 Les Chanticleers tour	(Papua New Guinea) Lloyd Robson Oval, Port Moresby	5,000
16 October 1994	Papua New Guinea	12–26	New Zealand	1994 Kiwi tour	(Papua New Guinea) Danny Leahy Oval, Goroka	13,000
27 October 1994	Papua New Guinea	16–30	New Zealand	1994 Kiwi tour	(Papua New Guinea) Lloyd Robson Oval, Port Moresby	15,000
10 October 1995	Papua New Guinea	23–20	Tonga	1995 World Cup	(England) The Boulevard, Kingston-upon-Hull	5,121
13 October 1995	New Zealand	22–6	Papua New Guinea	1995 World Cup	(England) Knowsley Road, St Helens	8,679
3 July 1996	New Zealand Residents	21–6	Papua New Guinea	Friendly	(New Zealand) Mount Smart, Auckland	Unknown
8 July 1996	Papua New Guinea	56–19	Tonga	Friendly	(Papua New Guinea) Sir Hubert Murray Stadium, Port Moresby	Unknown
28 September 1996	Papua New Guinea	30–32	Great Britain	1996 Lions tour	(Papua New Guinea) Lae Oval, Lae	10,000
5 October 1996	New Zealand	62–8	Papua New Guinea	Friendly	(New Zealand) Rotorua International Stadium, Rotorua	4,800
6 October 1996	Papua New Guinea	6–52	Australia	Friendly	(Papua New Guinea) Lloyd Robson Oval, Port Moresby	15,000
11 October 1996	New Zealand	64–0	Papua New Guinea	Friendly	(New Zealand) Palmerston North Showgrounds, Palmerston North	2,000
11 May 1997	New Zealand Residents	21–18	Papua New Guinea	1997 Pacific Cup	(New Zealand) Carlaw Park, Auckland	Unknown
13 May 1997	Papua New Guinea	34–12	Cook Islands	1997 Pacific Cup	(New Zealand) Carlaw Park, Auckland	Unknown
15 May 1997	Māori	34–6	Papua New Guinea	1997 Pacific Cup	(New Zealand) Carlaw Park, Auckland	Unknown
18 May 1997	Papua New Guinea	38–14	Cook Islands	1997 Pacific Cup	(New Zealand) Carlaw Park, Auckland	Unknown
18 July 1998	Fiji	14–16	Papua New Guinea	Three match series friendly	(Fiji) Prince Charles Park, Nadi	Unknown
22 July 1998	Papua New Guinea	34–12	Fiji	Three match series friendly	(Papua New Guinea) Danny Leahy Oval, Goroka	Unknown
26 July 1998	Papua New Guinea	10–14	Fiji	Three match series friendly	(Papua New Guinea) Lloyd Robson Oval, Port Moresby	Unknown
7 October 1998	Papua New Guinea	46–6	Cook Islands	Papua New Guinea 50th Anniversary Tournament	(Papua New Guinea) Lloyd Robson Oval, Port Moresby	8,000
11 October 1998	Papua New Guinea	44–28	Tonga	Papua New Guinea 50th Anniversary Tournament	(Papua New Guinea) Lloyd Robson Oval, Port Moresby	7,000
14 October 1998	Papua New Guinea	46–0	Māori	Papua New Guinea 50th Anniversary Tournament	(Papua New Guinea) Lloyd Robson Oval, Port Moresby	10,000
18 October 1998	Papua New Guinea	54–12	Tonga	Papua New Guinea 50th Anniversary Tournament	(Papua New Guinea) Lloyd Robson Oval, Port Moresby	Unknown

=== 2000s ===
Date	Home	Score	Away	Competition	Location	Attendance
7 October 2000	Australia	82–0	Papua New Guinea	Friendly	(Australia) Willows Sports Complex, Townsville	21,000
28 October 2000	Papua New Guinea	23–20	France	2000 World Cup	(France) Stade Sébastien Charléty, Paris	7,498
2 November 2000	Papua New Guinea	16–0	South Africa	2000 World Cup	(France) Stadium de Toulouse, Toulouse	4,313
6 November 2000	Papua New Guinea	30–22	Tonga	2000 World Cup	(France) Stade Municipal, Saint-Estève	3,666
12 November 2000	Wales	22–8	Papua New Guinea	2000 World Cup	(England) Halton Stadium, Widnes	5,211
17 June 2001	Papua New Guinea	16–27	France	2001 France tour	(Papua New Guinea) Lloyd Robson Oval, Port Moresby	15,000
20 June 2001	Papua New Guinea	34–24	France	2001 France tour	(Papua New Guinea) Danny Leahy Oval, Goroka	12,000
7 October 2001	Papua New Guinea	12–54	Australia	Friendly	(Papua New Guinea) Lloyd Robson Oval, Port Moresby	14,000
28 October 2007	Wales	50–10	Papua New Guinea	Friendly	(Wales) Brewery Field, Bridgend	1,456
3 November 2007	France	38–26	Papua New Guinea	Two-match series friendly	(France) Parc des Sports, Avignon	7,248
10 November 2007	France	22–16	Papua New Guinea	Two-match series friendly	(France) Stade André Moga, Bordeaux	4,500
25 October 2008	England	32–22	Papua New Guinea	2008 World Cup	(Australia) Willows Sports Complex, Townsville	10,780
1 November 2008	New Zealand	48–6	Papua New Guinea	2008 World Cup	(Australia) Robina Stadium, Robina	11,278
9 November 2008	Australia	46–6	Papua New Guinea	2008 World Cup	(Australia) Willows Sports Complex, Townsville	16,239
29 October 2009	Papua New Guinea	44–14	Tonga	2009 Pacific Cup	(Papua New Guinea) Lloyd Robson Oval, Port Moresby	9,813
1 November 2009	Papua New Guinea	42–14	Cook Islands	2009 Pacific Cup	(Papua New Guinea) Lloyd Robson Oval, Port Moresby	10,151

=== 2010s ===
Date	Home	Score	Away	Competition	Location	Attendance
24 October 2010	Australia	42–0	Papua New Guinea	2010 Four Nations	(Australia) Parramatta Stadium, Parramatta	11,308
30 October 2010	New Zealand	76–12	Papua New Guinea	2010 Four Nations	(New Zealand) Rotorua International Stadium, Rotorua	6,000
6 November 2010	England	36–10	Papua New Guinea	2010 Four Nations	(New Zealand) Eden Park, Auckland	Unknown
19 October 2013	Scotland	20–38	Papua New Guinea	Friendly	(England) Post Office Road, Featherstone	Unknown
27 October 2013	Papua New Guinea	8–9	France	2013 World Cup	(England) Craven Park, Kingston-upon-Hull	7,481
4 November 2013	Papua New Guinea	4–38	Samoa	2013 World Cup	(England) Craven Park, Kingston-upon-Hull	6,871
8 November 2013	New Zealand	56–10	Papua New Guinea	2013 World Cup	(England) Headingley Rugby Stadium, Leeds	18,180
19 October 2014	Papua New Guinea	32–18	Tonga	Friendly	(Papua New Guinea) Lae Oval, Lae	Unknown
2 May 2015	Papua New Guinea	10–22	Fiji	Friendly	(Australia) Robina Stadium, Robina	12,336
7 May 2016	Papua New Guinea	24–22	Fiji	Friendly	(Australia) Parramatta Stadium, Parramatta	15,225
6 May 2017	Papua New Guinea	32–22	Cook Islands	Friendly	(Australia) Campbelltown Sports Stadium, Leumeah	18,271
14 October 2017	Fiji	0–10	Papua New Guinea	Friendly	(Fiji) ANZ National Stadium, Suva	Unknown
14 October 2017	Australia	20–4	Papua New Guinea	Friendly	(Fiji) ANZ National Stadium, Suva	Unknown
28 October 2017	Papua New Guinea	50–6	Wales	2017 World Cup	(Papua New Guinea) PNG Football Stadium, Port Moresby	14,800
5 November 2017	Papua New Guinea	14–6	Ireland	2017 World Cup	(Papua New Guinea) PNG Football Stadium, Port Moresby	14,800
12 November 2017	Papua New Guinea	64–0	United States	2017 World Cup	(Papua New Guinea) PNG Football Stadium, Port Moresby	14,800
19 November 2017	England	36–6	Papua New Guinea	2017 World Cup	(Australia) Melbourne Rectangular Stadium, Melbourne	10,563
23 June 2018	Papua New Guinea	26–14	Fiji	Friendly	(Australia) Campbelltown Sports Stadium, Leumeah	17,802
27 October 2018	Papua New Guinea	12–16	England Knights	2018 Knights tour	(Papua New Guinea) Lae Oval, Lae	Unknown
3 November 2018	Papua New Guinea	32–22	England Knights	2018 Knights tour	(Papua New Guinea) PNG Football Stadium, Port Moresby	Unknown
22 June 2019	Papua New Guinea	6–24	Samoa	2019 Oceania Shield	(Australia) Leichhardt Oval, Sydney	8,408
9 November 2019	Fiji	22–20	Papua New Guinea	2019 Oceania Shield	(New Zealand) Rugby League Park, Christchurch	8,875
16 November 2019	Papua New Guinea	28–10	Great Britain	2019 Lions tour	(Papua New Guinea) PNG Football Stadium, Port Moresby	Unknown

=== 2020s ===
Date	Home	Score	Away	Competition	Location	Attendance
25 June 2022	Papua New Guinea	24–14	Fiji	Friendly	(Papua New Guinea) PNG Football Stadium, Port Moresby	10,720
18 October 2022	Tonga	24–18	Papua New Guinea	2021 World Cup	(England) Totally Wicked Stadium, St Helens	10,409
25 October 2022	Papua New Guinea	60–4	Cook Islands	2021 World Cup	(England) Halliwell Jones Stadium, Warrington	6,273
31 October 2022	Papua New Guinea	36–0	Wales	2021 World Cup	(England) Eco-Power Stadium, Doncaster	6,968
5 November 2022	England	46–8	Papua New Guinea	2021 World Cup	(England) DW Stadium, Wigan	23,179
15 October 2023	Papua New Guinea	46–10	Cook Islands	2023 Pacific Bowl	(Papua New Guinea) PNG Football Stadium, Port Moresby	7,133
29 October 2023	Papua New Guinea	16–43	Fiji	2023 Pacific Bowl	(Papua New Guinea) PNG Football Stadium, Port Moresby	14,546
5 November 2023	Fiji	12–32	Papua New Guinea	2023 Pacific Bowl	(Papua New Guinea) PNG Football Stadium, Port Moresby	14,809
19 October 2024	Fiji	10–22	Papua New Guinea	2024 Pacific Bowl	(Fiji) ANZ National Stadium, Suva	7,581
3 November 2024	Papua New Guinea	42–20	Cook Islands	2024 Pacific Bowl	(Papua New Guinea) PNG Football Stadium, Port Moresby	Unknown
10 November 2024	New Zealand	54–12	Papua New Guinea	2024 Pacific Bowl	(Australia) Western Sydney Stadium, Sydney	Unknown
25 October 2025	Papua New Guinea	40–28	Cook Islands	2025 Pacific Bowl	(Papua New Guinea) PNG Football Stadium, Port Moresby	14,864
1 November 2025	Papua New Guinea	50–18	Fiji	2025 Pacific Bowl	(Papua New Guinea) PNG Football Stadium, Port Moresby	12,046
17 October 2026	Papua New Guinea	42–18	Lebanon	2026 World Cup	(Papua New Guinea) PNG Football Stadium, Port Moresby	11,624
24 October 2026	Papua New Guinea	6–64	Samoa	2026 World Cup	(Papua New Guinea) PNG Football Stadium, Port Moresby	15,008
30 October 2026	England	34–12	Papua New Guinea	2026 World Cup	(Australia) Wollongong Showground, Wollongong	15,063

== See also ==
- Papua New Guinea National Rugby League
- Papua New Guinea national rugby league team
- Rugby league in Papua New Guinea
