= 1991 Kumuls tour =

The 1991 Kumuls tour was a rugby league tour by the Papua New Guinea team which took place from October to November 1991. It was the team's third tour to the Northern Hemisphere, and included nine games played in Great Britain and France. The team played one Test match each against the Great Britain and France national teams, which counted towards the 1989–1992 World Cup.

== Touring squad ==
An initial 24-man squad was selected for the tour.

Skerry Palanga was the team's head coach during the tour, with Tau Peruka, Rod Pearce and Joe Keviame appointed as tour managers.

Two additional players (Matmillo and Numapo) joined the tour in France, while three of the players selected (Moi, Sinemau and Uradok) returned home after the British leg.

Name	Apps	Tests	Tries	Goals	DGs	Points
Michael Angra	6	2	0	0	0	0
Philip Boge	9	3	1	5	0	14
Thomas Daki	5	2	1	0	0	4
Joe Gispe	6	3	1	0	0	4
Stanley Haru	7	3	1	1	0	6
Leslee Hoffman	8	3	0	0	0	0
Chris Itam	9	3	3	0	0	12
Sam Karara	5	0	0	0	0	0
Tuksy Karu	7	3	0	9	0	18
Johannes Kola	4	0	1	0	0	4
Joshua Kouoru	7	3	1	0	0	4
Ngala Lapan	8	3	0	0	0	0
Michael Matmillo	4	1	0	0	0	0
Danny Moi	3	0	0	0	0	0
James Naipao	7	3	1	0	0	4
Kera Ngaffin	7	2	0	0	0	0
Bal Numapo	1	0	0	0	0	0
Kes Paglipari	7	3	0	0	0	0
Lipirin Palangat	7	2	0	0	0	0
Korul Sinemau	3	1	0	0	0	0
Max Tiri	8	3	0	0	0	0
John Unagi	5	2	0	0	0	0
Jack Uradok	3	1	0	0	0	0
Richard Wagambie	8	3	4	0	0	16
Ipisa Wanega	4	2	0	0	0	0
John Yawing	3	0	1	0	0	4

== Great Britain leg ==
27 October 1991

Wales	68 – 0	Papua New Guinea
Tries: Ford (3), Davies (2), Sullivan (2), Ackerman, Griffiths, Bateman, Hadley, Bishop, Ellis; Goals: Davies (8)

Vetch Field, Swansea
Attendance: 11,422
Referee: Bill Harrigan (Australia)

FB	1	Phil Ford
RW	2	John Devereux
RC	3	Allan Bateman
LC	4	Jonathan Davies
LW	5	Anthony Sullivan
FE	6	Jonathan Griffiths
HB	7	Kevin Ellis
PR	8	Dai Young
HK	9	Barry Williams
PR	10	Mark Jones
SR	11	Rob Ackerman
SR	12	Paul Moriarty
LF	13	David Bishop
Substitutions:
IC	14	Adrian Hadley
IC	15	Rowland Phillips
IC	16	Matthew Silva
IC	17	Gary Pearce
Coach:

FB	1	Phillip Boge
RW	2	Joshua Kouoru
RC	3	Korul Sinemau
LC	4	Richard Wagambie
LW	5	Jack Uradok
SO	6	Tuksy Karu
SH	7	Stanley Haru
PR	8	John Unagi
HK	9	Kes Paglipari
PR	10	James Naipao
SR	11	Thomas Daki
SR	12	Max Tiri
LK	13	Joe Gispe
Substitutions:
IC	14	Ngala Lapan
IC	15	Chris Itam
IC	16	Michael Angra
IC	17	Leslee Hoffman
Coach:
(Papua New Guinea) Skerry Palanga

30 October 1991	Great Britain U-21	58 – 0	Papua New Guinea	Leeds
	Tries: Myers (3), McCurrie (2), Newlove (2), Connolly, Goulding, Pearson; Goals: Pearson (8), Goulding			Attendance: 2,027; Referee: Bill Harrigan (Australia)

3 November 1991	Humberside XIII	16 – 14	Papua New Guinea	The Boulevard, Hull
	Tries: Jackson, P. Fletcher, Sodje; Goals: M. Fletcher, Eastwood		Tries: Wagambie, Itam; Goals: Boge (3)	Attendance: 2,800; Referee: John Holdsworth (Kippax)

5 November 1991	Cumbria	34 – 12	Papua New Guinea	Workington
	Tries: Tait (2), Maguire, Rudd, Birkett, Armstrong; Goals: Wear (5)		Tries: Yawing, Itam; Goals: Boge (2)	Attendance: 1,588; Referee: Colin Morris (Huddersfield)

=== Test ===
9 November 1991

Great Britain	56 – 4	Papua New Guinea
Tries: Jackson (2), Moriarty (2), Schofield, Powell, Sullivan, Betts, Newlove, Fairbank; Goals: Davies (8)		Goals: Karu (2)

Wigan
Attendance: 4,193
Referee: Bill Harrigan (Australia)

FB	1	Steve Hampson
RW	2	Paul Newlove
RC	3	Daryl Powell
LC	4	Jonathan Davies
LW	5	Anthony Sullivan
FE	6	Garry Schofield
HB	7	Shaun Edwards
PR	8	Karl Harrison
HK	9	Martin Dermott
PR	10	Andy Platt
SR	11	Denis Betts
SR	12	Paul Moriarty
LF	13	Michael Jackson
Substitutions:
IC	14	Deryck Fox
IC	15	Karl Fairbank
IC	16	Gary Connolly
IC	17	Gary Price
Coach:
(England) Mal Reilly

FB	1	Ipisa Wanega
RW	2	Joshua Kouoru
RC	3	Richard Wagambie
LC	4	Phillip Boge
LW	5	Chris Itam
SO	6	Tuksy Karu
SH	7	Stanley Haru
PR	8	John Unagi
HK	9	Kes Paglipari
PR	10	Kera Ngaffin
SR	11	James Naipao
SR	12	Leslee Hoffman
LK	13	Joe Gispe
Substitutions:
IC	14	Ngala Lapan
IC	15	Liprin Palangat
IC	16	Max Tiri
IC	17	Thomas Daki
Coach:
(Papua New Guinea) Skerry Palanga

== France leg ==
13 November 1991	Midi-Pyrénées	35 – 4	Papua New Guinea	Toulouse
			Tries: Gispe

17 November 1991	President's XIII	32 – 16	Papua New Guinea	Villeneuve-sur-Lot
			Tries: Wagambie, Daki, Kola; Goals: Karu (2)

20 November 1991	Provence	20 – 26	Papua New Guinea	Carpentras
			Tries: Wagambie (2), Boge, Kourou, Naipao; Goals: Karu (3)

=== Test ===
24 November 1991

France	28 – 14	Papua New Guinea
Tries: Garcia, Pons, Dumas, Divet, Bonnafous; Goals: Dumas (4)		Tries: Itam, Haru; Goals: Karu (2), Haru

Carcassonne
Attendance: 1,440
Referee: Colin Morris (England)

FB	1	Marc Balleroy
RW	2	Jean-Marc Garcia
RC	3	David Despin
LC	4	Denis Bienes
LW	5	Cyril Pons
FE	6	Gilles Dumas
HB	7	Patrick Entat
PR	8	Yves Viloni
HK	9	Francis Lope
PR	10	Pierre Ailleres
SR	11	Pierre Montgaillard
SR	12	Daniel Divet
LF	13	Christophe Bonnafous
Substitutions:
IC	14	Pascal Fages
IC	15	Adolphe Alesina
IC	16	Yves Storer
IC	17	Abdrajah Baba
Coach:

FB	1	Ipisa Wanega
RW	2	Chris Itam
RC	3	Richard Wagambie
LC	4	Phillip Boge
LW	5	Joshua Kouoru
SO	6	Tuksy Karu
SH	7	Stanley Haru
PR	8	James Naipo
HK	9	Michael Matmillo
PR	10	Kera Ngaffin
SR	11	Max Tiri
SR	12	Kes Paglipari
LK	13	Joe Gispe
Substitutions:
IC	14	Liprin Palangat
IC	15	Ngala Lapan
IC	16	Michael Angara
IC	17	Leslee Hoffman
Coach:
(Papua New Guinea) Skerry Palanga

== See also ==
- Rugby league in Papua New Guinea
