= 1985–86 Sheffield Shield season =

Australian cricket tournament

- Cricket format: First-class
- Tournament format(s): Double round-robin & Final
- Champions: New South Wales (39th title)
- Participants: 6
- Matches: 31
- Player of the series: Allan Border (Queensland)
- Most runs: Mark Taylor (New South Wales) (903)
- Most wickets: Jeff Thomson (Queensland) (42)

The 1985–86 Sheffield Shield season was the 84th season of the Sheffield Shield, the domestic first-class cricket competition of Australia. New South Wales won the championship.

== Table ==
Team	Played	Won	Lost	Tied	Drawn	N/R	Points
New South Wales	10	4	1	0	5	0	56
Queensland	10	4	0	0	6	0	54
Victoria	10	2	1	0	7	0	48
Western Australia	10	2	1	0	7	0	42
South Australia	10	2	4	0	4	0	28
Tasmania	10	0	7	0	3	0	4

== Final ==
Queensland	v	New South Wales (H)
436; Kepler Wessels 166; Glenn Trimble 112; Mike Whitney 6/65		294; Greg Dyer 88 no*
133/7 dec Peter Taylor 4/31		258/8; Dirk Wellham 80

Match Drawn, New South Wales win by virtue of topping regular season ladder.
Venue: Sydney

== Statistics ==
=== Most Runs ===
Mark Taylor 903

=== Most Wickets ===
Jeff Thomson 42
