= Gary Wurth =

Australian rugby league footballer

Personal information
- Full name: Gary Wurth
- Born: 6 June 1961 (age 63); Canberra, Australian Capital Territory

Playing information
- Position: Fullback, Wing, Five-eighth
Club
Years	Team	Pld	T	G	FG	P
1983	Canberra	5	1	0	0	4
1984–88	Eastern Suburbs	75	35	8	0	156
1989–91	Newcastle Knights	39	8	0	5	37
	Total	119	44	8	5	197
Representative
Years	Team	Pld	T	G	FG	P
1989	NSW Country	1	0	0	0	0
- Source: As of 6 February 2019

Gary Wurth is an Australian former professional rugby league footballer who played in the 1980s and 1990s for the Canberra Raiders, Eastern Suburbs Roosters and the Newcastle Knights in the New South Wales Rugby League premiership and National Rugby League competitions. His position of choice was at fullback.

== Background ==
Wurth was born in Canberra, Australian Capital Territory.

== Playing career ==
A wholehearted player, Wurth played 73 matches for the Roosters scoring 35 tries. Wurth scored a hat-trick of tries in Easts last match at the Sydney Sports Ground.

After departing the Roosters, Wurth joined the Newcastle Knights from the 1989 season. He would play 3 seasons for the club before retiring in 1991.

In 1989 the fullback was selected in the NSW Country representative side.
