= Danny Shepherd =

Australian rugby league footballer

Danny Shepherd is an Australian former rugby league footballer who played in the New South Wales Rugby League (NSWRL) competition in the 1980s and 1990s.

A promising front-row forward for the Eastern Suburbs Roosters, Shepherd played 41 games for the club between 1987 and 1990. He was struck down by severe sunstroke during an early season match against the Gold Coast at the Sydney Football Stadium in March 1990. After eleven days near death at Sydney's St Vincent's Hospital, Shepherd went on to make a full recovery. He returned to his hometown of Dubbo to continue playing and coaching rugby league in the country, though never played first-grade football again.
