= 1972–73 Sheffield Shield season =

Australian cricket tournament

- Cricket format: First-class
- Tournament format: Double round-robin
- Champions: Western Australia (4th title)
- Participants: 5
- Matches: 20
- Most runs: Doug Walters (New South Wales) (654)
- Most wickets: Ashley Mallett (South Australia) (49)

The 1972–73 Sheffield Shield season was the 71st season of the Sheffield Shield, the domestic first-class cricket competition of Australia. Western Australia, the defending champions, won the championship. The points system changed with ten points now awarded for a win.

== Table ==
Team	Played	Won	Drawn	Lost	Win points	Batting points	Bowling points	Total Points
Western Australia	8	4	2	2	40	26	29	95
South Australia	8	3	4	1	30	23	26	79
New South Wales	8	3	1	4	30	12	30	72
Victoria	8	1	4	3	10	29	25	64
Queensland	8	2	3	3	20	8	31	59

== Statistics ==
=== Most Runs ===
Doug Walters 654

=== Most Wickets ===
Ashley Mallett 49
