= 1973–74 Sheffield Shield season =

Australian cricket tournament

- Cricket format: First-class
- Tournament format: Double round-robin
- Champions: Victoria (22nd title)
- Participants: 5
- Matches: 20
- Most runs: Greg Chappell (Queensland) (1013)
- Most wickets: Geoff Dymock (Queensland) (39)

The 1973–74 Sheffield Shield season was the 72nd season of the Sheffield Shield, the domestic first-class cricket competition of Australia. Victoria won the championship.

== Table ==
Team	Played	Won	Drawn	Lost	Batting points	Bowling points	Total Points
Victoria	8	5	1	2	50	55	105
Queensland	8	4	2	2	40	58	98
New South Wales	8	4	2	2	40	50	90
Western Australia	8	3	1	4	30	53	83
South Australia	8	1	0	7	10	52	62

== Statistics ==
=== Most Runs ===
Greg Chappell 1013

=== Most Wickets ===
Geoff Dymock 39
