= Charlie Taylor (rugby league) =

English rugby league footballer

Personal information
- Full name: Charles Taylor
- Born: third ¼ 1921 York, England
- Died: November 2013 (aged 92) Norton-on-Derwent, York, England

Playing information
- Position: Centre, Loose forward
Club
Years	Team	Pld	T	G	FG	P
1938–51	York	242	53	9	0	177
Representative
Years	Team	Pld	T	G	FG	P
1950	Yorkshire	1	0	0	0	0

Charles Taylor (third ¼ 1921 – November 2013) was an English professional rugby league footballer who played in the 1930s, 1940s and 1950s, and coached in the 1950s. He played at representative level for Yorkshire, and at club level for Heworth A.R.L.F.C. and York (captain), as a centre, or loose forward, and he coached at club level for York (Assistant Coach to player-coach W. "Bill" Riley (born c. 1927) signed from Swinton in 1949) from 1952 to 1960, including in York's 8–15 defeat by Huddersfield in the 1957–58 Yorkshire Cup Final during the 1957–58 season at Headingley, Leeds on Saturday 19 October 1957, in front of a crowd of 22,531.

== Background ==
Charlie Taylor's birth was registered in York, he served in the Royal Navy on destroyers during the Arctic convoys of World War II, and in the English Channel and Mediterranean until 1946. He worked at Rowntree's in York (latterly in their fire service department), he and his wife Renie, also a worker at Rowntree's, lived on Haley's Terrace, York. He spent his last 8-years in a care home in Norton-on-Derwent, York, North Yorkshire, England, where he died from dementia. His funeral took place at York Crematorium, Bishopthorpe Road on 18 November 2013.

== Playing career ==
Taylor made his first-team début aged-17 for York in the 35–0 victory over Leigh on Saturday 19 November 1938, and he played his last match for York on Saturday 20 August 20 January 1951. He played for Yorkshire against Cumberland at Recreation Ground, Whitehaven in 1950. York staged a benefit/testimonial match in Taylor's honour, against a Lionel Cooper XIII, at Clarence Street, York on Wednesday 9 May 1951. Taylor was inducted into the York Rugby League Hall of Fame in 2014, alongside Geoff Hunter, Kevin Harkin, Graham Steadman and Rich Hayes.
