= Willie Hargreaves =

English rugby league footballer

Personal information
- Full name: Willie Hargreaves
- Born: second ¼ 1931; Wakefield district, England
- Died: 4 July 2013 (aged 82); York, England

Playing information
- Height: 5 ft 8 in (1.73 m)
- Weight: 11 st 3 lb (71 kg)
- Position: Fullback
Club
Years	Team	Pld	T	G	FG	P
1952–66	York	444+2	61	21		225

Willie Hargreaves (birth registered second ¼ 1931 – 4 July 2013), also known by the nickname of "Little Rock", was an English professional rugby league footballer who played in the 1950s and 1960s. He played at club level for Stanley Rangers ARLFC, and York, as a fullback.

== Background ==
Willie Hargreaves' birth was registered in Wakefield district, West Riding of Yorkshire, England, he died aged 82 in York, North Yorkshire, England, and his funeral took place at York Crematorium at 10.20am on Friday 19 July 2013.

== Playing career ==
=== County Cup Final appearances ===
Willie Hargreaves played fullback in York's 8-15 defeat by Huddersfield in the 1957 Yorkshire Cup Final during the 1957–58 season at Headingley, Leeds on Saturday 19 October 1957.

=== Club career ===
Willie Hargreaves made his début for York on Monday 3 November 1952, and he played his last match for York on Sunday 20 November 1966.

=== Testimonial match ===
Willie Hargreaves' Testimonial match for York took place in 1962.

== Honoured at York Rugby League ==
The first seven players to be inducted into the York Rugby League Hall of Fame during March 2013 were; Geoffrey Pryce, Gary Smith (rugby league, York born), Vic Yorke, Norman Fender, Willie Hargreaves, Basil Watts and Edgar Dawson.
