= Denzil Webster =

English rugby footballer & cricketer

Personal information
- Born: fourth 1/4 1933 Pontefract district, England
- Died: January 2010 (aged 75) York, England

Playing information
- Height: 5 ft 11 in (1.80 m)
- Weight: 13 st 0 lb (83 kg)

Rugby union
Club
| Years | Team | Pld | T | G | FG | P |
|---|---|---|---|---|---|---|
| ≤1952–52 | Castleford RUFC |
Representative
| Years | Team | Pld | T | G | FG | P |
| 1953 | Army Rugby Union | 1 | 2 | 0 | 0 | 10 |

Rugby league
- Position: Centre
Club
| Years | Team | Pld | T | G | FG | P |
|---|---|---|---|---|---|---|
| 1952–57 | Castleford | 98 | 63 | 0 | 0 | 189 |
| 1957–59 | York | 59 | 34 | 0 | 0 | 102 |
| | Total | 157 | 97 | 0 | 0 | 291 |
Representative
| Years | Team | Pld | T | G | FG | P |
| 1955 | Yorkshire | 1 | 0 | 0 | 0 | 0 |

Denzil Webster (fourth 1/4 1933 – January 2010) was an English cricketer of the 1940s through to the 1970s, and a rugby union, and professional rugby league footballer who played in the 1950s. He played club level cricket for Castleford, York and Acomb (in York), representative level rugby union (RU) for the Army Rugby Union, and at club level for Castleford RUFC (in Castleford, Wakefield), as a fly-half, or wing, and representative level rugby league (RL) for Yorkshire, and at club level for Castleford and York, as a centre.

== Background ==
Denzil Webster's birth was registered in Pontefract district, West Riding of Yorkshire, England, he lived with his parents on Thomas Street, Castleford, he was a pupil at Castleford Grammar School, where he was the captain of the school's cricket and rugby union teams, he performed his National service as a Bombardier, and a physical training instructor, in the 64th Training Regiment of the Royal Artillery, stationed at Oswestry, Shropshire, he moved to Acomb in 1956, he trained as a teacher at St. John's College, York, he became a physical education (PE) teacher at Danesmead Secondary School, York (as of 1986, the site is the York Steiner School), he was the President of York Wasps from the mid-1990s to 2001, he was the Secretary, and President of York Rugby League Past Players' Association, he was the chairman of Acomb Cricket Club, he was the President of the York and District Senior Cricket League from 1998 to 2000, he was an honorary life-Vice-President of York and District Senior Cricket League, he died after a long illness age 75 in Hospital in York, North Yorkshire, his funeral service was held at York Crematorium at 2pm on Thursday 4 February 2010, his ashes are buried in the York Crematorium gardens of remembrance X 0 2, he is an Acomb Hall Of Fame inductee, and Acomb's 'Young Player Of The Year Award' is known as the 'Denzil Webster Award'.

== Cricket playing career ==
Webster was an all-rounder; a hard-hitting batsman and pace bowler, and although he was still a schoolboy, he played for the Castleford first-team in the Yorkshire League, following his move to Acomb in 1956, he played for York in the Yorkshire League, in 1961 he joined Acomb in the York and District Senior Cricket League, and he captained them to their First Division title in 1978.

== Rugby playing career ==
Webster played fly-half for Castleford RUFC, aged-19 he played wing, and scored two tries for the Army Rugby Union against Oxford University RFC during January 1953, he was signed by Castleford in February 1953 in time to be included in their 1953 Challenge Cup squad register, the Castleford Rugby League Supporters Club paid the £450 cost of his signing-on fee (based on increases in average earnings, this would be approximately £29,540 in 2017), Castleford declined a "substantial offer" for Denzil Webster by Bradford Northern during April 1955, he, along with Derek Smart, scored a hat-trick of tries in the 32-12 victory over Hull Kingston Rovers on Saturday 31 March 1956, he was transferred from Castleford to York for a transfer-fee of £3000 (based on increases in average earnings, this would be approximately £164,900 in 2017). he made his début for York on Saturday 13 October 1956, he played in a trial match for the 1958 Great Britain Lions tour of Australia and New Zealand, but ultimately he was not selected for Great Britain, he played his last match for York on Saturday 20 September 1958, he retired from rugby league due to a knee-injury.

=== County honours ===
Webster won a cap while at Castleford, he played at centre in Yorkshire's (RL) 14-2 victory over Cumberland at Bradford Northern's stadium on Wednesday 5 October 1955.

=== County Cup Final appearances ===
Webster played at centre in York's 8-15 defeat by Huddersfield in the 1957–58 Yorkshire Cup Final during the 1957–58 season at Headingley Rugby Stadium, Leeds on Saturday 19 October 1957.
