= Basil Watts =

GB & England international rugby league footballer (1926–2019)

Personal information
- Born: 15 June 1926 York, England
- Died: 31 December 2019 (aged 93)

Playing information
- Height: 6 ft 1 in (1.85 m)
- Weight: 14 st 3 lb (90 kg)
- Position: Second-row
Club
Years	Team	Pld	T	G	FG	P
1949–61	York	354	65	0	0	195
Representative
Years	Team	Pld	T	G	FG	P
1953	England	1	0	0	0	0
1954–55	Great Britain	5	1	0	0	3

Basil J. Watts (15 June 1926 – 31 December 2019) was an English World Cup winning professional rugby league footballer who played in the 1940s, 1950s and 1960s. He played at representative level for Great Britain and England, and at club level for York, as a second-row.

== Background ==
Watts was born in York on 15 June 1926 and attended the local Poppleton School. He joined the army in 1944 and took up rugby league after being released in 1948, joining York in 1949. After he retired from rugby in 1961, he worked as a publican and then at the Imphal Barracks in York.

== Playing career ==
A one-club man Watts played his entire career at York making his debut on 8 October 1949, his last game was on 6 May 1961 after making 354 appearances for the club scoring 65 tries.

Watts played in a single major final when he played left-second-row in York's 8–15 defeat by Huddersfield in the 1957–58 Yorkshire Cup Final Headingley, Leeds on Saturday 19 October 1957.

=== International honours ===
Basil Watts won a cap for England in November 1953 against Other Nationalities. The following year he was selected for the Great Britain squad for the 1954 Rugby League World Cup when he played left-second-row in all four of Great Britain's 1954 World Cup matches, including the 16–12 victory over France in the 1954 Rugby League World Cup final at Parc des Princes, Paris on 13 November 1954. His fifth and final Great Britain cap was on 12 November 1955 against New Zealand when he scored his only international try in the 27–12 victory.

== York Hall of Fame ==
Watts was one of the first seven players to be inducted into the York Rugby League Hall of Fame during March 2013 along with; Geoff Pryce, Gary Smith, Vic Yorke, Norman Fender, Willie Hargreaves, and Edgar Dawson.
