= Edgar Dawson (rugby league) =

GB international rugby league footballer

Personal information
- Full name: Edgar Wallace Dawson
- Born: 10 October 1931; Great Ouseburn district, England
- Died: 28 June 2015 (aged 83); York Hospital, York

Playing information
- Height: 5 ft 11 in (1.80 m)
- Weight: 14 st 10 lb (93 kg)
- Position: Loose forward
Club
Years	Team	Pld	T	G	FG	P
1950–62	York	339	55	1	0	167
Representative
Years	Team	Pld	T	G	FG	P
1956–58	English League XIII	2	0	0	0	0
1956	Great Britain	1	0	0	0	0

Edgar Wallace Dawson (10 October 1931 – 28 June 2015) was an English professional rugby league footballer who played in the 1950s and 1960s. He played at representative level for Great Britain and English League XIII, and at club level for Clarence Working Men's Club ARLFC (Clarence Street, York), and York, as a loose forward.

== Background ==
Edgar Dawson's birth was registered in Great Ouseburn district, West Riding of Yorkshire, England, he was a joiner.

== Playing career ==
=== International honours ===
Edgar Dawson represented the English League XIII while at York in the 18-17 victory over France at Stade Vélodrome, Marseille on Sunday 21 October 1956, and in 19-8 victory over France at Headingley, Leeds on Wednesday 16 April 1958, and won a cap for Great Britain while at York in the 21-10 victory over Australia at Central Park, Wigan on Saturday 17 November 1956.

Edgar Dawson was selected for the 1958 Great Britain Lions tour of Australia, and New Zealand. However, prior to the tour he dislocated a shoulder when playing for York's 'A' team, and was unable to participate in the tour.

=== County Cup Final appearances ===
Edgar Dawson played loose forward in York's 8-15 defeat by Huddersfield in the 1957 Yorkshire Cup Final during the 1957–58 season at Headingley, Leeds on Saturday 19 October 1957.

=== Club career ===
Edgar Dawson made his début for York on Wednesday 30 August 1950, and played his last match on Friday 1 June 1962.

== Honoured at York Rugby League ==
The first seven players to be inducted into the York Rugby League Hall of Fame during March 2013 were; Geoffrey Pryce, Gary Smith, Vic Yorke, Norman Fender, Willie Hargreaves, Basil Watts, and Edgar Dawson.

== Personal life ==
Dawson married his wife Theresa in 1952, with whom he had two children, Paul and Susan.

He died at York Hospital, aged 83. His funeral took place on 10 July 2015 at St Aelred's Roman Catholic Church on Fifth Avenue, Tang Hall, and was cremated at York Crematorium.
