= Norman Fender =

GB & Wales dual-code international rugby footballer

- Born: Norman Henry Fender; 2 September 1910 Cardiff, Wales
- Died: 24 October 1983 (aged 73) York, England
- School: Ninian Park School
- Occupation(s): labourer licensee

Rugby union career
- Position: Flanker
Amateur team(s)
Years	Team	Apps	(Points)
1927–31	Cardiff RFC		
International career
Years	Team	Apps	(Points)
1930–31	Wales	6	(3)
- Rugby league career

Playing information
- Position: Forward
Club
Years	Team	Pld	T	G	FG	P
1931–38	York	228				100
Representative
Years	Team	Pld	T	G	FG	P
1932–38	Wales	9				3
1932	Great Britain	0				0

Norman Henry Fender (2 September 1910 – 24 October 1983) was a Welsh dual-code international rugby footballer who played rugby union for Cardiff as a flanker and rugby league with York. He won six caps for Wales at rugby union, and also represented Wales at rugby league. In 1932/33 he toured Australasia with Great Britain.

== Playing career ==
=== International honours ===
Norman Fender won caps for Wales (RU) while at Cardiff RFC in 1930 against Ireland, and France, and in 1931 against England, Scotland, France, and Ireland, represented Great Britain (RL) while at York on the 1932/33 tour to Australasia playing in 14 tour (non-Test matches), scoring 11-tries, and won caps for Wales (RL) while at York 1932...1938 9-caps.

=== County Cup Final appearances ===
Norman Fender played loose forward, and scored a goal in York's 9–2 victory over Wakefield Trinity in the 1936 Yorkshire Cup Final during the 1936–37 season at Headingley, Leeds on Saturday 17 October 1936.

=== Club career ===
Norman Fender made his début for York on Saturday 29 August 1931, and played his last match on Sunday 18 September 1938.

== Honoured at York Rugby League ==
The first seven players to be inducted into the York Rugby League Hall of Fame during March 2013 were; Geoffrey Pryce, Gary Smith, Vic Yorke, Norman Fender, Willie Hargreaves, Basil Watts and Edgar Dawson.

== Bibliography ==
- Godwin, Terry (1984). The International Rugby Championship 1883–1983. Grafton Street, London: Willow Books. ISBN 0-00-218060-X.
- Smith, David; Williams, Gareth (1980). Fields of Praise: The Official History of The Welsh Rugby Union. Cardiff: University of Wales Press. ISBN 0-7083-0766-3.
