= 1991–92 Yorkshire Cup =

- Structure: Regional knockout championship
- Teams: 19
- Winners: Castleford
- Runners-up: Bradford Northern

The 1991–92 Yorkshire Cup was the 84th occasion on which the Yorkshire Cup competition had been held.

Cup holders, Castleford, retained the trophy by beating Bradford Northern by the score of 28–6.

This was the eighth time in the incredible eleven-year period in which Castleford, previously only once winners in 1977–78, had made eight appearances in the Yorkshire Cup final, winning on four and ending as runner-up on four occasions. It was also the second year in succession that Castleford had won the trophy. within that eleven-year period.

== Background ==
This season there were no junior/amateur clubs taking part, no "leavers" but one new entrant in the form of Scarborough Pirates and so the total of entries increased by one from last season, to a total of nineteen.

This in turn resulted in the necessity to continue with a preliminary round to reduce the number of clubs entering the first round to sixteen.

== Competition and results ==
=== Preliminary round ===
Involved 3 matches and 6 clubs

Game No	Fixture Date	Home team	Score	Away team	Venue	Att	Rec	Notes	Ref
P1	Sun 25 Aug 1991	Doncaster	10–14	Scarborough Pirates	Bentley Road Stadium/Tattersfield	1080		(Note: The first match to be played in the Yorkshire Cup by newly elected to the league Scarborough Pirates (this was also the club's very first match to be played))	
P2	Sun 25 Aug 1991	Nottingham City	7–36	Huddersfield	Harvey Hadden Stadium	176			
P3	Sun 25 Aug 1991	Ryedale-York	36–8	Hunslet	Ryedale Stadium	707			

=== Round 1 ===
Involved 8 matches (with no byes) and 16 clubs

Game No	Fixture Date	Home team	Score	Away team	Venue	Att	Rec	Notes	Ref
1	Sun 15 Sep 1991	Batley	12–36	Castleford	Mount Pleasant	3089			
2	Sun 15 Sep 1991	Featherstone Rovers	30–7	Scarborough Pirates	Post Office Road	2761		(Note: The second (and last) Yorkshire Cup match to be played by Scarborough Pirates, who folded after just one season after reputedly losing over £100,000)	
3	Sun 15 Sep 1991	Hull F.C.	16–11	Leeds	Boulevard	8255			
4	Sun 15 Sep 1991	Hull Kingston Rovers	18–5	Dewsbury	Craven Park (2)	3060		(Note: The first match to be played by Hull Kingston Rovers since moving into their new purpose built stadium)	
5	Sun 15 Sep 1991	Halifax	18–24	Wakefield Trinity	Thrum Hall	6132			
6	Sun 15 Sep 1991	Huddersfield	28–10	Ryedale-York	Fartown	1387			
7	Sun 15 Sep 1991	Keighley Cougars	8–20	Bramley	Cougar Park	1204		(Note: The first Yorkshire Cup match to be played by Keighley Cougars after the re-branding of the club and the stadium with the Cougars suffix)	
8	Mon 16 Sep 1991	Sheffield Eagles	13–15	Bradford Northern	Don Valley Stadium	2012		(Note: The first Yorkshire Cup match to be played by Sheffield Eagles since moving into their new home at Don Valley Stadium)	

=== Round 2 - Quarter-finals ===
Involved 4 matches and 8 clubs

Game No	Fixture Date	Home team	Score	Away team	Venue	Att	Rec	Notes	Ref
1	Wed 25 Sep 1991	Bramley	15–38	Bradford Northern	McLaren Field	2009			
2	Wed 25 Sep 1991	Castleford	24–12	Hull Kingston Rovers	Wheldon Road	4953			
3	Wed 25 Sep 1991	Huddersfield	9–52	Wakefield Trinity	Fartown	4799			
4	Wed 25 Sep 1991	Hull F.C.	16–16	Featherstone Rovers	Boulevard	6437			
Replay	Tue 01 Oct 1991	Featherstone Rovers	21–18	Hull F.C.	Post Office Road	3751			

=== Round 3 – Semi-finals ===
Involved 2 matches and 4 clubs

Game No	Fixture Date	Home team	Score	Away team	Venue	Att	Rec	Notes	Ref
1	Wed 09 Oct 1991	Bradford Northern	14–10	Wakefield Trinity	Odsal	4173			
2	Wed 09 Oct 1991	Castleford	18–10	Featherstone Rovers	Wheldon Road	8890			

=== Final ===
The match was played at Elland Road, Leeds. The attendance was 8,916.

20 October 1991

Castleford	28 – 6	Bradford Northern
Tries: Steadman (2), Ford, Smith, Battye; Goals: Steadman (4)		Tries: Powell; Goals: Hobbs

Elland Road, Leeds
Attendance: 8,916
Referee: John Holdsworth (Kippax)
White Rose Trophy: Graham Steadman

==== Teams and scorers ====
Castleford	№	Bradford Northern
	Teams	
Graham Steadman	1	Roger Simpson
St. John Ellis	2	Daio Powell
Graeme Bradley	3	Darrall Shelford
Richie Blackmore	4	Steve McGowan
David Nelson	5	Tony Marchant
Tony Smith	6	Tony Anderson
Mike Ford	7	Brett Iti
Dean Sampson	8	David Hobbs
Graham Southernwood	9	Brian Noble
Keith England	10	Jon Hamer
Neil Battye	11	Paul Medley
Shaun Irwin	12	Karl Fairbank (c)
Tawera Nikau (c)	13	Steve Barnett
	Subs	
Grant Anderson	14	David Croft (for Iti, 62 mins)
Martin Ketteridge (for Sampson, 72 mins)	15	Craig Richards (for Medley, 62 mins)
Darryl Van de Velde	Coach	David Hobbs

Scoring - Try = four points - Goal = two points - Drop goal = one point

=== The road to success ===
The following chart excludes any preliminary round fixtures/results

First round
Batley	12
Castleford	36
Hull Kingston Rovers	18
Dewsbury	5
Hull F.C.	16
Leeds	11
Featherstone Rovers	30
Scarborough Pirates	7
Keighley Cougars	8
Bramley	20
Sheffield Eagles	13
Bradford Northern	15
Huddersfield	28
Ryedale-York	10
Halifax	18
Wakefield Trinity	24

Second round
Castleford	34
Hull Kingston Rovers	12
Hull F.C.	16 (18)
Featherstone Rovers	16 (21)
Bramley	15
Bradford Northern	38
Huddersfield	9
Wakefield Trinity	52

Semi-finals
Castleford	18
Featherstone Rovers	10
Bradford Northern	14
Wakefield Trinity	10

Final
Castleford	28
Bradford Northern	6

== See also ==
- 1991–92 Rugby Football League season
- Rugby league county cups
