= 1957–58 Yorkshire Cup =

- Structure: Regional knockout championship
- Teams: 16
- Winners: Huddersfield
- Runners-up: York

The 1957 Yorkshire Cup was the 50th occasion on which the Yorkshire Cup competition had been held. Huddersfield won the trophy by beating York by the score of 15–8.

== Results ==
This season there were no junior/amateur clubs taking part, no new entrants and no "leavers" and so the total of entries remained the same at sixteen.

This in turn resulted in no byes in the first round.

=== Round 1 ===
Round 1 involved 8 matches (with no byes) and 16 clubs.

Game No	Fixture date	Home team	Score	Away team	Venue	Att	Rec	Notes	Ref
1	Sat 31 Aug 1957	Dewsbury	12–28	Bradford Northern	Crown Flatt				
2	Sat 31 Aug 1957	Doncaster	9–29	Castleford	Bentley Road Stadium/Tattersfield				
3	Sat 31 Aug 1957	Featherstone Rovers	46–5	Hull Kingston Rovers	Post Office Road				
4	Sat 31 Aug 1957	Huddersfield	68–19	Batley	Fartown	6,912			
5	Sat 31 Aug 1957	Hull F.C.	14–16	Hunslet	Boulevard				
6	Sat 31 Aug 1957	Leeds	55–10	Bramley	Headingley				
7	Sat 31 Aug 1957	Wakefield Trinity	19–16	Halifax	Belle Vue				
8	Sat 31 Aug 1957	York	15–8	Keighley	Clarence Street				

=== Round 2 - quarterfinals ===
Involved 4 matches and 8 clubs

Game No	Fixture date	Home team	Score	Away team	Venue	Att	Rec	Notes	Ref
1	Tue 10 Sep 1957	Castleford	6–19	Leeds	Wheldon Road				
2	Mon 16 Sep 1957	Wakefield Trinity	10–13	Huddersfield	Belle Vue	7,546			
3	Tue 17 Sep 1957	Bradford Northern	5–2	Featherstone Rovers	Odsal				
4	Wed 18 Sep 1957	Hunslet	17–19	York	Parkside				

=== Round 3 – semifinals ===
Involved 2 matches and 4 clubs

Game No	Fixture date	Home team	Score	Away team	Venue	Att	Rec	Notes	Ref
1	Mon 30 Sep 1957	Bradford Northern	2–2	York	Odsal				
2	Wed 2 Oct 1957	Huddersfield	14–2	Leeds	Fartown	11,766			

=== Semifinal - replays ===
Involved 1 match and 2 clubs

Game No	Fixture date	Home team	Score	Away team	Venue	Att	Rec	Notes	Ref
R	Wed 2 Oct 1957	York	14–8	Bradford Northern	Clarence Street				

=== Final ===
The match was played at Headingley, Leeds, now in West Yorkshire. The attendance was 22,531 and receipts were £4,123.

Game No	Fixture date	Home team	Score	Away team	Venue	Att	Rec	Notes	Ref
	Saturday 19 October 1957	Huddersfield	15–8	York	Headingley	22,531	£4,123		

==== Teams and scorers ====
Huddersfield	№	York
	teams	
Frank Dyson	1	Willie Hargreaves
Harry Plunkett	2	Brian Smith
Austin Kilroy	3	Denzil Webster
Roland Barrow	4	Geoffrey Smith
Mick Sullivan	5	Stan J. Flannery
Peter Ramsden	6	Johnny Robinson
Tommy Smales	7	W. "Bill" Riley (c)
Ted Slevin	8	Frank Moore
Roy Wood	9	Ray Illingworth
David Flint	10	Vic Yorke
Brian Briggs	11	Basil Watts
Ken Bowman	12	Ron L. O'Brien
Dave Valentine (c)	13	Edgar Dawson
??	Coach	W. "Bill" Riley
15	score	8
7	HT	6
	Scorers	
	Tries	
Austin Kilroy (1)	T	Ray Illingworth (1)
Tommy Smales (1)	T	Stan J. Flannery (1)
Kenneth "Ken" Bowman (1)	T	
	Goals	
Frank Dyson (3)	G	Vic Yorke (1)
	Drop Goals	
	DG	
Referee		C F (Charlie) Appleton

Scoring - Try = three (3) points - Goal = two (2) points - Drop goal = two (2) points

=== The road to success ===
First round
Wakefield Trinity	19
Halifax	16
Huddersfield	68
Batley	19
Doncaster	9
Castleford	29
Leeds	55
Bramley	10
Dewsbury	12
Bradford Northern	28
Featherstone Rovers	46
Hull Kingston Rovers	5
Hull F.C.	14
Hunslet	16
York	15
Keighley	8

Second round
Wakefield Trinity	10
Huddersfield	13
Castleford	6
Leeds	19
Bradford Northern	5
Featherstone Rovers	2
Hunslet	17
York	19

Semifinals
Huddersfield	14
Leeds	2
Bradford Northern	2 (14)
York	2 (8)

Final
Huddersfield	15
York	8

== See also ==
- 1957–58 Northern Rugby Football League season
- Rugby league county cups
