= Peter Smith (rugby league, born 1955) =

Former GB & England international rugby league footballer

Personal information
- Full name: Peter Smith
- Born: 17 September 1955 (age 69); Featherstone, West Riding of Yorkshire, England

Playing information
- Position: Second-row, Loose forward
Club
Years	Team	Pld	T	G	FG	P
1974–89	Featherstone Rovers	419	110	0	1	365
1991–92	Scarborough Pirates	13	1	0	0	4
	Total	432	111	0	1	369
Representative
Years	Team	Pld	T	G	FG	P
1978–86	Yorkshire	4	0	0	0	0
1980	England	1	0	0	0	0
1977–84	Great Britain	6	1	0	0	3

Coaching information
Club
Years	Team	Gms	W	D	L	W%
2002–03	Whitehaven RLFC	19	5	5	9	26
- Relatives: Morgan Smith (grandson)

Peter Smith (born 17 September 1955) is an English former professional rugby league footballer who played in the 1970s, 1980s and 1990s. He played at representative level for Great Britain, England and Yorkshire, and at club level for Featherstone Rovers (vice-captain), and Scarborough Pirates (captain), as a second-row, or loose forward.

== Background ==
Peter Smith was born in Featherstone, West Riding of Yorkshire, England, and he is the grandfather of the rugby league footballer Morgan Smith.

== Playing career ==
=== Club career ===
Peter Smith signed for Featherstone Rovers on 31 May 1972, and he made his first-team début for Featherstone Rovers on Sunday 13 January 1974, during his time at Featherstone Rovers he scored seventy-six 3-point tries, and thirty-four 4-point tries.

Smith played loose forward in Featherstone Rovers' 14–12 victory over Hull F.C. in the 1983 Challenge Cup Final during the 1982–83 season at Wembley on Saturday 7 May 1983, in front of a crowd of 84,969.

Smith played right-second-row, and scored a try in Featherstone Rovers' 12–16 defeat by Leeds in the 1976 Yorkshire Cup Final during the 1976–77 season at Headingley, Leeds on Saturday 16 October 1976, played as a substitute, (replacing second-row Richard "Charlie" Stone) in the 7–17 defeat by Castleford in the 1977 Yorkshire Cup Final during the 1977–78 season at Headingley, Leeds on Saturday 15 October 1977, and played loose forward, and scored a try in the 14–20 defeat by Bradford Northern in the 1989 Yorkshire Cup Final during the 1989–90 season at Headingley, Leeds on Sunday 5 November 1989.

Peter Smith's benefit season/testimonial match at Featherstone Rovers took place during the 1985–86 season.

=== Representative honours ===
Peter Smith won a cap for England while at Featherstone Rovers in 1980 against France, and won caps for Great Britain while at Featherstone Rovers in the 1977 Rugby League World Cup against Australia (sub) (2 matches), in 1982 against Australia, in 1983 against France (sub) (2 matches), in 1984 against France (sub).

Peter Smith won caps for Yorkshire while at Featherstone Rovers; during the 1978–79 season against Lancashire, during the 1981–82 season against Lancashire, during the 1982–83 season against Lancashire, and during the 1986–87 season against Lancashire.

== Honoured at Featherstone Rovers ==
Peter Smith is a Featherstone Rovers Hall of Fame inductee.

== Contemporaneous Article Extract ==
"Peter Smith Second-row. Was signed as the first captain of the newly formed Scarborough Pirates. Smith, 35 years old, is a former international colleague of Pirates coach Len Casey. Had a long career of over 15 years with Featherstone Rovers, and played in five (sic six) Tests for Great Britain. Recognised as one of the most respected players of his era."
