= Chris Smith (rugby league, born 1975) =

Wales international rugby league footballer

Personal information
- Born: 31 October 1975 (age 49); Castleford, England

Playing information
- Position: Wing
Club
Years	Team	Pld	T	G	FG	P
1992–97	Castleford	109	42	0	0	168
1998–00	St. Helens	79	28	0	0	112
2001–02	Hull FC	15	4	0	0	16
2003–04	York City Knights	33	14	0	0	56
	Total	236	88	0	0	352
Representative
Years	Team	Pld	T	G	FG	P
1999–02	Wales	5	1	0	0	4
- Father: Gary Smith

Chris Smith (born 31 October 1975) is a former Wales international rugby league footballer who played in the 1990s and 2000s. He played at representative level for Wales also represented GB in the Gatorade superleague 9's played in Townsville 1997, and at club level for Redhill ARLFC (Castleford), Castleford, St. Helens, Hull FC and York City Knights, primarily as a wing.

== Background ==
Smith was born in Castleford, West Yorkshire, England.

== Playing career ==
Started his professional career at Castleford Tigers. The youngest player to make his first team debut. He spent 5 years at Castleford before signing for St Helens in December 1997. Smith made his début for St. Helens in the 56–24 victory over Featherstone Rovers at Post Office Road, Featherstone on Sunday 15 February 1998. He played for the club on the wing in their 1999 Super League Grand Final victory over Bradford Bulls. He played his last match for Saints in the 30–22 victory over Wakefield Trinity at Belle Vue, Wakefield on Sunday 11 June 2000.

Having won the 1999 Grand Final, Saints contested in the 2000 World Club Challenge against National Rugby League Premiers Melbourne Storm, with Smith playing on the wing in the loss.

Smith joined newly formed York City Knights in 2003, making a total of 33 appearances during two seasons at the club.

Smith scored one try and won five caps for Wales while at St Helens and Hull between 1999 and 2002, and played for the team at the 2000 Rugby League World Cup. More recently he became Head coach of the Haydock open age setup. Taking the club from the first national conference league to the North West premier league.

== Genealogical information ==
Chris Smith is the son of the rugby league footballer; Gary Smith. Gary played for York from 1972 to 1985. Being inducted into the hall of fame for York rugby league. And played 427 games.
