= Brett Iti =

New Zealand rugby footballer

- Born: Brett Peter Iti; 28 March 1965 (age 61) Wellington, New Zealand

Rugby union career
- Position: Half-back
Provincial / State sides
Years	Team	Apps	(Points)
1985	Waikato	6	(0)
1986	Bay of Plenty	4	(16)
1987–95	Auckland	37	(96)
International career
Years	Team	Apps	(Points)
1986–90	New Zealand Maori	14	(60)
- Rugby league career

Playing information
- Position: Scrum-half
Club
Years	Team	Pld	T	G	FG	P
1990–93	Bradford Northern	52	18	0	0	72
1993	→ Carlisle (loan)	5	3	0	0	12
	Total	57	21	0	0	84

Brett Peter Iti (born 28 March 1965) is a New Zealand former rugby union and rugby league footballer who played as a half-back.

== Rugby union ==
Iti was a New Zealand Maori representative, and played 14 games for the team between 1986 and 1990. In 1988, he scored six tries for the Maori team against Argentinian team Rosario.

After his contract with Bradford Northern expired, Iti sought a return to rugby union. After initially being granted permission by the New Zealand Rugby Football Union (NZRFU), the decision was later overruled by the International Rugby Board, who banned him from playing due to his professional stint in rugby league. However, the NZRFU later defied the ruling, and reinstated Iti in 1994, believing that the ban was not legally enforceable.

== Rugby league ==
In July 1990, Iti switched codes to rugby league, signing a three-year contract with Bradford Northern. He made his first start for the club in September 1990, scoring two tries in a 20–24 loss against St Helens. Later that season, he played for Bradford in their 2–12 defeat against Warrington in the 1990–91 Regal Trophy final.

He played in Bradford's defeat to Castleford in the 1991–92 Yorkshire Cup final.

In 1993, Iti spent time on loan at Carlisle.

== Personal life ==
Iti's younger brother, Clarry, was also a rugby player, and played rugby league for Featherstone Rovers during the 1990–91 season.
