= Will Pryce =

English rugby league player

Personal information
- Full name: William Pryce
- Born: 5 December 2002 (age 23) Bradford, Yorkshire, England
- Height: 6 ft 0 in (1.83 m)
- Weight: 14 st 7 lb (92 kg)

Playing information
- Position: Fullback, Stand-off, Scrum-half
Club
Years	Team	Pld	T	G	FG	P
2021–23	Huddersfield Giants	46	17	62	0	192
2024–25	Newcastle Knights	5	1	2	0	8
2025–	Hull FC	12	3	13	1	39
	Total	63	21	77	1	239
Representative
Years	Team	Pld	T	G	FG	P
2021–	England Knights	2	1	10	1	24
- Source: As of 31 March 2025
- Father: Leon Pryce
- Relatives: Karl Pryce (uncle); Geoff Pryce (cousin); Waine Pryce (cousin)

Will Pryce (born 5 December 2002) is a professional rugby league footballer who plays as a fullback, stand-off and scrum-half for Hull FC in the Super League and the England Knights at international level.

He previously played for Huddersfield Giants in the Super League and Newcastle Knights in the National Rugby League.

== Background ==
Pryce is of Jamaican descent and is the son of former England and Great Britain international Leon Pryce. His uncle Karl Pryce, and distant relations Waine Pryce and Steve Pryce are former professional rugby league footballers, as was Geoff Pryce.

He played his junior rugby league for Siddal, has played for England at youth level and is a product of the Giants Academy system.

== Playing career ==
=== 2021 ===
In 2021, he made his Super League début for Huddersfield against the Catalans Dragons.

=== 2022 ===
In round 6 of the 2022 Super League season, Pryce was sent off for a dangerous tackle in Huddersfield's 14-6 loss against Hull F.C. Pryce was subsequently suspended for ten matches.

In December, it was announced that Pryce had signed a two-year contract with the Newcastle Knights in the NRL, starting in 2024.

=== 2023 ===
Pryce played 17 matches with Huddersfield in the 2023 Super League season as the club finished ninth on the table and missed the playoffs.

=== 2024 ===
In round 17 of the 2024 NRL season, Pryce made his NRL debut, scoring a try in Newcastle's 34-26 win over the Parramatta Eels. Pryce was limited to just six games for Newcastle in the 2024 NRL season as the club finished 8th and qualified for the finals.

=== 2025 ===
On 31 March 2025, it was announced that Pryce had joined Hull FC in the Super League, on a 3½-year deal, after being allowed to leave Newcastle Knights on compassionate grounds, to return to the UK.
