= Steve Robinson (English rugby league) =

English rugby league footballer

Playing information
- Position: Scrum-half
Club
Years	Team	Pld	T	G	FG	P
1987–89	Halifax	32	2	0	0	8
1989–91	Hull Kingston Rovers	21	5	0	0	20
1991–92	Scarborough Pirates	19	1	0	0	4
	Total	72	8	0	0	32
Representative
Years	Team	Pld	T	G	FG	P
1988	Great Britain U21	1	0	0	0	0

Steve Robinson is an English former rugby league footballer who played as a scrum-half in the 1980s and 1990s.

== Career ==
=== Club career ===
Robinson started his career with Halifax. He played at Wembley in the club's 1988 Challenge Cup defeat against Wigan.

He was transferred to Hull Kingston Rovers in January 1989 for a fee of £25,000, and scored two tries on his debut. He moved to Scarborough Pirates in July 1991.

=== Representative career ===
While at Halifax, Robinson appeared once for Great Britain under-21's against France in March 1988.
