= Waine Pryce =

Jamaica international rugby league footballer

Personal information
- Born: 3 October 1981 (age 44) Bradford, West Yorkshire, England
- Height: 5 ft 9 in (1.75 m)
- Weight: 13 st 7 lb (86 kg)

Playing information
- Position: Wing, Centre
Club
Years	Team	Pld	T	G	FG	P
2000–06	Castleford Tigers	140	80	0	0	320
2007	Wakefield Trinity Wildcats	13	5	0	0	20
2008–09	Featherstone Rovers	47	24	0	0	96
2010–11	Hunslet Hawks	42	33	0	0	132
2012	York City Knights	11	2	0	0	8
2013	Hunslet Hawks	22	4	0	0	16
	Total	275	148	0	0	592
Representative
Years	Team	Pld	T	G	FG	P
2003	England 'A'	2
2011	Jamaica	2
- Source: As of 14 February 2012
- Relatives: Karl Pryce (cousin); Geoff Pryce (cousin); Leon Pryce (cousin); Will Pryce (2nd cousin)

Waine Pryce (born 3 October 1981) is a former professional rugby league footballer who played as a winger and also as a centre in the 2000s and 2010s. He played at international level for England 'A' and Jamaica, and at club level for the Castleford Tigers, Wakefield Trinity Wildcats, Featherstone Rovers, Hunslet Hawks (two spells) and the York City Knights.

== Background ==
Waine Pryce was born in Bradford, West Yorkshire, England, he comes from a family of rugby league footballers with his father and uncles having played professionally, he has Jamaican ancestors, and eligible to play for Jamaica due to the grandparent rule. He is the cousin of the rugby league footballer; Leon Pryce and the rugby league footballer; Karl Pryce. As of 2014 he works as a mechanical engineer.

== Castleford Tigers ==
Waine Pryce came through the Castleford Tigers Academy system as a youngster. He made his début for the senior team in 2000. He has scored 80 tries for CastlefordTigers in 140 starting appearances. During July 2006's Super League XI, Pryce broke the tibia and fibula in his left leg away at Harlequins RL. The extent of his injury forced him to have a metal rod and screws inserted into his injured leg.

Because of the injury, Pryce missed the last two months of the 2006's Super League XI, which saw Castleford Tigers relegated. For the 2007 Super League season, Pryce was transferred from the Castleford Tigers to the Wakefield Trinity Wildcats. Then in 2008 Pryce joined former Castleford Tigers teammate Tom Saxton, and joined Featherstone Rovers.

== Wakefield Trinity Wildcats ==
Although relegated with Castleford Tigers from the Super League competition, Wakefield Trinity Wildcats signed Waine Pryce. Although Pryce missed the first few games of the season as he was still recovering from his injury.

Waine has released by Wakefield Trinity Wildcats as he never became a regular in the first-team.

== England ==
He has won international honours for the England 'A' side, making appearances against New Zealand, Tonga and Fiji. He has also represented England 'A' in the 2003 European Nations Cup competition.
