= Neil Battye =

English rugby league footballer

Personal information
- Born: 11 August 1963 (age 62) Dewsbury, England

Playing information
- Position: Second-row
Club
Years	Team	Pld	T	G	FG	P
1983–93	Castleford	63	11	0	0	44
1993–94	Leeds	1	0	0	0	0
1994–95	Featherstone Rovers	1	0	0	0	0
1996	Hunslet	1	1	0	0	4
	Total	66	12	0	0	48

Neil Battye (born 11 August 1963) is an English former professional rugby league footballer who played in the 1980s and 1990s. He played at club level for Stanley Rangers ARLFC, Castleford, Leeds and Featherstone Rovers, as a second-row.

== Background ==
Neil Battye was born in Dewsbury, West Riding of Yorkshire, England

== Playing career ==
=== Club career ===
Battye made his début for Castleford in the 46-22 victory over Featherstone Rovers on Sunday 21 August 1983.

Battye played at second-row (replaced by substitute Martin Ketteridge) in Castleford's 11-8 victory over Wakefield Trinity in the 1990 Yorkshire Cup Final during the 1990–91 season at Elland Road, Leeds on Sunday 23 September 1990, and played at second-row, and scored a try in the 28-6 victory over Bradford Northern in the 1991 Yorkshire Cup Final during the 1991–92 season at Elland Road, Leeds on Sunday 20 October 1991.

He was transferred from Castleford to Leeds, he was transferred from Leeds to Featherstone Rovers, he made his début for Featherstone Rovers on 22 January 1995, and he played his last match for Featherstone Rovers during the 1994–95 season.
