= Geoff Smith (rugby league) =

GB international rugby league footballer

Personal information
- Full name: Geoffrey Smith
- Born: Wakefield, England
- Died: c. 1934 (age 90–91)

Playing information
- Height: 5 ft 8.5 in (1.74 m)
- Weight: 12 st 0 lb (76 kg)
- Position: Wing, Centre
Club
Years	Team	Pld	T	G	FG	P
≤1957–≥64	York
1966–67	Bradford Northern	15	7	0	0	21
	Total	15	7	0	0	21
Representative
Years	Team	Pld	T	G	FG	P
1962–65	Yorkshire	6	6	0	0	18
1963–64	Great Britain	3	2	0	0	6

Geoffrey "Geoff" Smith (born c. 1934) is an English former rugby union and professional rugby league footballer who played in the 1950s and 1960s. He played club level rugby union (RU) for York Railway Institute RUFC, and representative rugby league (RL) for Great Britain and Yorkshire, and at club level for York, as a wing or centre.

== Background ==
Geoff Smith was born in Wakefield, West Riding of Yorkshire, England.

== Playing career ==
=== International honours ===
Geoff Smith won caps for Great Britain while at York in 1963 against Australia, and in 1964 against France (2 matches).

=== County honours ===
Geoff Smith won cap(s) for Yorkshire while at York.

=== County Cup Final appearances ===
Geoff Smith played left-centre in York's 8-15 defeat by Huddersfield in the 1957 Yorkshire Cup Final during the 1957–58 season at Headingley, Leeds on Saturday 19 October 1957.
