= Kenny Hill (rugby league) =

English rugby league footballer

Personal information
- Born: 20 September 1968 (age 56)

Playing information
- Position: Fullback
Club
Years	Team	Pld	T	G	FG	P
1987–90	Castleford	31	1	0	0	4
1990	Doncaster	4	0	0	0	0
1991–92	Scarborough Pirates	22	2	0	0	8
1994	Hull Kingston Rovers	7	1	0	0	4
1994–96	Bramley RLFC	23	2	0	0	8
	Total	87	6	0	0	24
Representative
Years	Team	Pld	T	G	FG	P
1988–89	Great Britain U-21	3	1	0	0	4

Kenny Hill (born 20 September 1968) is a former professional rugby league footballer who played in the 1980s and 1990s. He played at club level for Castleford, and the Scarborough Pirates as a fullback.

== Playing career ==
=== County Cup Final appearances ===
Kenny Hill played hooker in the 2–11 defeat by Bradford Northern in the 1987 Yorkshire Cup Final replay during the 1987–88 season at Elland Road, Leeds on Saturday 31 October 1987.
