= Garry Atkins =

English rugby league footballer

Personal information
- Born: 12 October 1966 (age 59) unknown

Playing information
- Position: Centre, Stand-off, Scrum-half
Club
| Years | Team | Pld | T | G | FG | P |
|---|---|---|---|---|---|---|
| 1986–90 | York | 78 | 32 | 0 | 0 | 128 |
| 1989 | Halifax | 2 | 1 | 0 | 0 | 4 |
| 1990–92 | Castleford | 9 | 1 | 0 | 0 | 4 |
| 1992–94 | Ryedale-York | 51 | 28 | 0 | 0 | 116 |
| 1995–98 | Hull Kingston Rovers | 119 | 79 | 0 | 1 | 317 |
| 1999–2000 | York Wasps | 14 | 4 | 0 | 0 | 16 |
| | Total | 273 | 145 | 0 | 1 | 585 |

Coaching information
Club
| Years | Team | Gms | W | D | L | W% |
| 2000 | York Wasps | 0 | 0 | 0 | 0 |

Garry Atkins (born 12 October 1966) is a former professional rugby league footballer who played in the 1980s, 1990s and 2000s. He played at club level for York (three spells), Castleford, and Hull Kingston Rovers, as a centre, stand-off, or scrum-half.

== Playing career ==
=== Club career ===
Atkins started his professional career at York. He played a total of 144 games across three different spells at the club (1986–1990, 1992–1994 and 1999–2000).

Atkins was transferred from York to Castleford on Wednesday 1 August 1990, and made his début for Castleford in the 12-30 defeat by Warrington on Sunday 9 September 1990.

Atkins played scrum-half, (replaced by substitute Keith England) and scored a try in Castleford's 11-8 victory over Wakefield Trinity in the 1990 Yorkshire Cup Final during the 1990–91 season at Elland Road, Leeds on Sunday 23 September 1990.
