= Leon Pryce =

GB & England international rugby footballer & coach (born 1981)

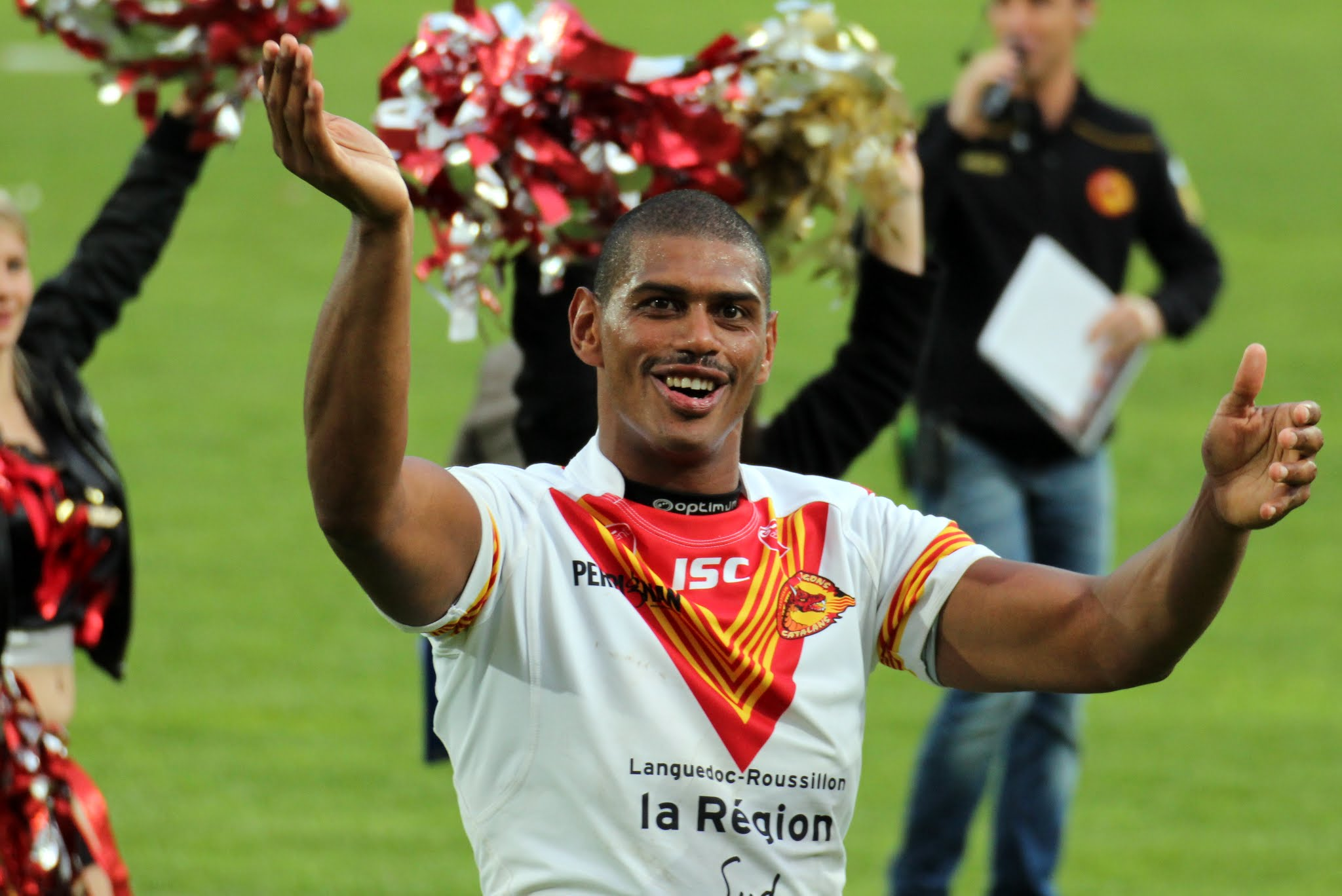

Personal information
- Full name: Leon Pryce
- Born: 9 October 1981 (age 45) Bradford, Yorkshire, England
- Height: 6 ft 3 in (1.91 m)
- Weight: 15 st 13 lb (101 kg)

Playing information
- Position: Stand-off, Wing, Centre, Fullback
Club
Years	Team	Pld	T	G	FG	P
1998–06	Bradford Bulls	206	94	0	0	376
2006–11	St Helens	160	73	0	0	292
2012–14	Catalans Dragons	81	20	0	0	80
2015–16	Hull F.C.	38	8	0	0	32
2017	Bradford Bulls	11	0	0	0	0
	Total	496	195	0	0	780
Representative
Years	Team	Pld	T	G	FG	P
1999–08	England	7	3	0	0	12
2001–07	Great Britain	17	5	0	0	20
2001–03	Yorkshire	4	3	0	0	12

Coaching information
Club
Years	Team	Gms	W	D	L	W%
2018–19	Workington Town	40	24	0	16	60
2026–	York Valkyrie	3	2	0	1	67
	Total	43	26	0	17	60
- Source: As of 9 October 2026
- Relatives: Karl Pryce (brother); Geoff Pryce (cousin); Waine Pryce (cousin); Will Pryce (son)

Leon Pryce (born 9 October 1981) is an English rugby league coach who is the head coach of York Valkyrie in the Women's Super League, and former rugby league footballer who played as a stand-off, wing, centre and fullback in the 1990s, 2000s and 2010s.

A Great Britain and England international back, he played for St Helens, with whom he had Challenge Cup, and Super League Championship success, the Catalans Dragons, Hull FC and the Bradford Bulls. He is a product of the Bradford Bulls Academy system.

== Early and personal life ==
Pryce was born on 9 October 1981, in Bradford, to Jamaican parents. He is the older brother of Bradford Bulls player Karl Pryce. His son, Will, is also a rugby player. His cousin, Steve Pryce, has coached in Jamaica, and he is also the cousin of Featherstone Rovers player Waine Pryce.

== Playing career ==
=== Bradford Bulls ===
At age 16, Pryce captained the England schools side. Pryce came through the academy ranks at Bradford Bulls, after the club signed him from amateur side Queensbury in Bradford. Pryce played for Bradford on the wing in the 1999 Super League Grand Final which was lost to St. Helens. He made his full début for England against France in 1999, and has also represented his home county of Yorkshire.

Pryce played for Bradford on the wing in their 2001 Super League Grand Final victory against the Wigan. As Super League VI champions, Bradford played against 2001 NRL Premiers, the Newcastle Knights in the 2002 World Club Challenge. Pryce was selected for the substitutes bench in Bradford's victory. Later that year Pryce played for Bradford from the substitutes bench in their 2002 Super League Grand Final loss against St. Helens.

In 2003, Pryce received 120 hours community service for unlawful wounding, after attacking former Bulls' fitness conditioner Eddie McGuinness with a glass. He played for Bradford from the substitutes bench in their 2003 Super League Grand Final victory against the Wigan. Having won Super League VIII, Bradford played against 2003 NRL Premiers, Penrith Panthers in the 2004 World Club Challenge. Pryce played at stand-off half back and scored a try in Bradford's 22–4 victory. He played for Bradford on the wing and scored a try in their 2005 Super League Grand Final victory against Leeds, winning the Harry Sunderland Award for a Man of the Match performance.

=== St Helens ===
After Bradford did not renew his contract in 2005, in 2006 Pryce joined St. Helens. One of the key issues in the decision was that he would start at stand off, a position Pryce has long coveted.

Pryce won his first trophy with St Helens in August 2006, defeating Huddersfield in the Challenge Cup Final at Twickenham. St Helens reached the 2006 Super League Grand final to be contested against Hull FC, and Pryce played at stand-off half back, scoring a try in Saints' 26–4 victory. As 2006 Super League champions, St Helens faced 2006 NRL Premiers Brisbane Broncos in the 2007 World Club Challenge. Pryce played at stand-off half back in the Saints' 18–14 victory. He went on to win the Challenge Cup again in 2007 when Saints beat Catalans Dragons 30–8 at Wembley Stadium. He was a joint winner of the Lance Todd Trophy along with Paul Wellens.

In July 2007, Pryce was accused of squeezing Sam Burgess' testicles. He was later found guilty of the incident and banned for three matches. That year he was voted rugby league's dirtiest player by RL Weekly readers.

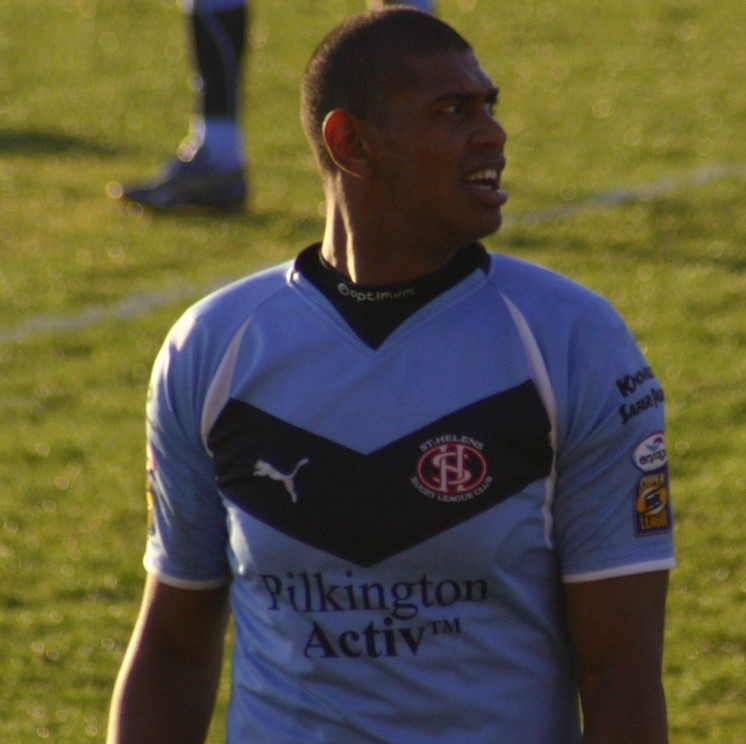
Pryce in 2008 with St Helens

He was again found guilty of a similar misconduct, against Bradford forward Andy Lynch on 22 February 2008. He escaped a possible eight-match ban as the disciplinary panel ruled the contact "minimal".

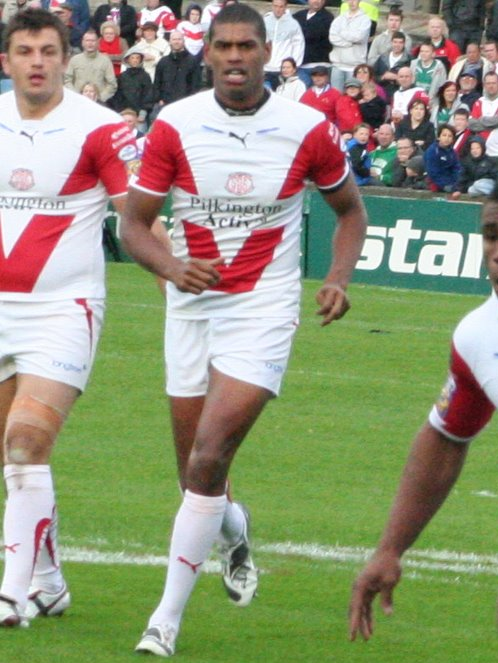
Pryce playing for Saints in 2009

His success at the club continued as he helped Saints to a 26–18 win over Hull in the 2008 Challenge Cup Final.

He was named in the England squad for the 2008 Rugby League World Cup.

He was named in the Super League Dream Team for the 2008's Super League XIII season.

He played in 2008's Super League XIII Grand Final defeat by Leeds.

Pryce went with the England squad to compete in the 2008 Rugby League World Cup tournament in Australia. In Group A's first match against Papua New Guinea he played at stand-off half back in England's victory.

In 2008 Pryce was charged and appeared in court alongside Stuart Reardon on charges of assault and violence following an alleged incident at Reardon's estranged wife's house in Queensbury, Bradford. They were charged with using violence to gain entry and common assault. The charge of using violence to gain entry against both defendants was dropped after the prosecution offered no evidence. In March 2009, having been found guilty of common assault, the pair were given a 12-week suspended sentence.

He played in the 2009 Super League Grand Final defeat by the Leeds Rhinos at Old Trafford.

=== Catalans Dragons ===
After being released by St Helens in 2011, Pryce signed for the Perpignan based Catalans Dragons for the 2012 season. The Stand-off made his début against Castleford Tigers in a 28–20 victory and was named Man of the Match. He went on to play 80 times for the French side and scored a total of 20 tries in the three seasons he spent at the club.

=== Hull FC ===
Pryce signed for Hull in 2015. In 2016 he was part of the team that won the Challenge Cup at Wembley for the first time. At the end of the 2016 season, Pryce announced his departure from Hull after two seasons and 38 appearances.

=== Bradford Bulls ===
Pryce re-signed for his hometown club Bradford ahead of the 2017 season, but the Bulls were liquidated in January 2017, casting doubt over Pryce's playing future. A new club was formed, which Pryce signed for. The new club was kept in the Championship, but started on −12 points. After 11 games Pryce announced his immediate retirement after a poor start to the season.

== Post-playing career ==
After Pryce retired he set up his own player agency. His son Will Pryce played for the Newcastle Knights in the NRL until moving to Hull FC for the 2025 Super League season.

== Coaching career ==
After retiring during the 2017 season, Leon accepted an offer to coach League 1 side Workington Town for the 2018 season.

== Honours ==
=== Club ===
- Super League (4): 2001, 2003, 2005, 2006
- World Club Challenge (3): 2002, 2004, 2007
- League Leader's Shield (6): 1999, 2001, 2003, 2006, 2007, 2008
- Challenge Cup (6): 2000, 2003, 2006, 2007, 2008, 2016
