= David Nelson (rugby league) =

English rugby league footballer & murder victim

Personal information
- Full name: David Nelson
- Born: 8 September 1962
- Died: 22 July 2001 (aged 38)

Playing information
- Position: Wing
Club
Years	Team	Pld	T	G	FG	P
1987–91	Sheffield Eagles	115	32	0	0	128
1991–94	Castleford	54	14	0	0	56
1994–95	Wakefield Trinity	18	4	0	0	16
	Total	187	50	0	0	200

David Nelson (8 September 1962 – 22 July 2001) was an English professional rugby league footballer who played in the 1980s and 1990s. He played at club level for Sheffield Eagles, Castleford and Wakefield Trinity, as a wing.

== Background ==
David Nelson worked in engineering. He was shot and murdered aged 38 in the Wilson's Arms public house, Moresdale Lane, Seacroft, Leeds.

== Playing career ==
=== Challenge Cup Final appearances ===
David Nelson played on the wing in Castleford's 12-28 defeat by Wigan in the 1992 Challenge Cup Final during the 1991–92 season at Wembley Stadium, London on Saturday 2 May 1992, in front of a crowd of 77,386.

=== County Cup Final appearances ===
David Nelson played on the wing in Castleford's 26-6 victory over Bradford Northern in the 1991–92 Yorkshire Cup Final during the 1991–92 season at Elland Road, Leeds on Sunday 20 October 1991, in front of a crowd of 8,916.

=== Club career ===
David Nelson was transferred from Sheffield Eagles to Castleford on 27 August 1991.
