= Gary Smith (rugby league, York born) =

English rugby league footballer (born 1951)

Personal information
- Full name: Gary Smith
- Born: 21 April 1954 (age 70); York, England

Playing information
- Position: Fullback, Stand-off, Scrum-half, Loose forward
Club
Years	Team	Pld	T	G	FG	P
1972–86	York	427	107	0	0	334
1986–88	Sheffield Eagles
1988–90	Batley
	Total	427	107	0	0	334
Representative
Years	Team	Pld	T	G	FG	P
1979	Yorkshire	1	0	0	0	0
- Relatives: Chris Smith (son)

Gary Smith (born 21 April 1954) is an English former professional rugby league footballer who played in the 1970s and 1980s. He played at representative level for Yorkshire, and at club level for York, as a utility player.

== Background ==
Smith was born in York on 21 April 1954. He is the father of the rugby league footballer; Chris Smith.

== Playing career ==
=== York ===
Gary Smith made his début for York on Monday 3 April 1972, he was a member of the sides that won promotion from the Second Division to the First Division as champions during the 1980–81 season, and in third-place during the 1984–85 season, during his time at York he scored 94 three-point tries and 13 four-point tries, and he played his last match for York on Thursday 12 December 1985.

Smith played fullback, and scored a try, in York's 8–18 defeat by Bradford Northern in the 1978–79 Yorkshire Cup Final during the 1978–79 season at Headingley, Leeds on Saturday 28 October 1978, in front of a crowd of 10,429.

Gary Smith played in York's 2–29 defeat by Australia at Clarence Street, York on Tuesday 14 November 1978, under temporary floodlights.

Gary Smith played in York's 8–14 defeat by Wigan in the 1983–84 Challenge Cup semi-final during the 1983–84 season at Elland Road, Leeds on Saturday 24 March 1984, in front of a crowd of 17,156.

=== Sheffield Eagles ===
Smith signed for Sheffield Eagles in January 1986.

=== Batley ===
Smith signed for Batley in November 1988.

=== Representative honours ===
Smith made one appearance for Yorkshire while at York.

== Honoured at York ==
Gary Smith is an inductee into both the York Hall Of Fame and the York Legends Roster.
