= Karl Pryce =

English rugby footballer

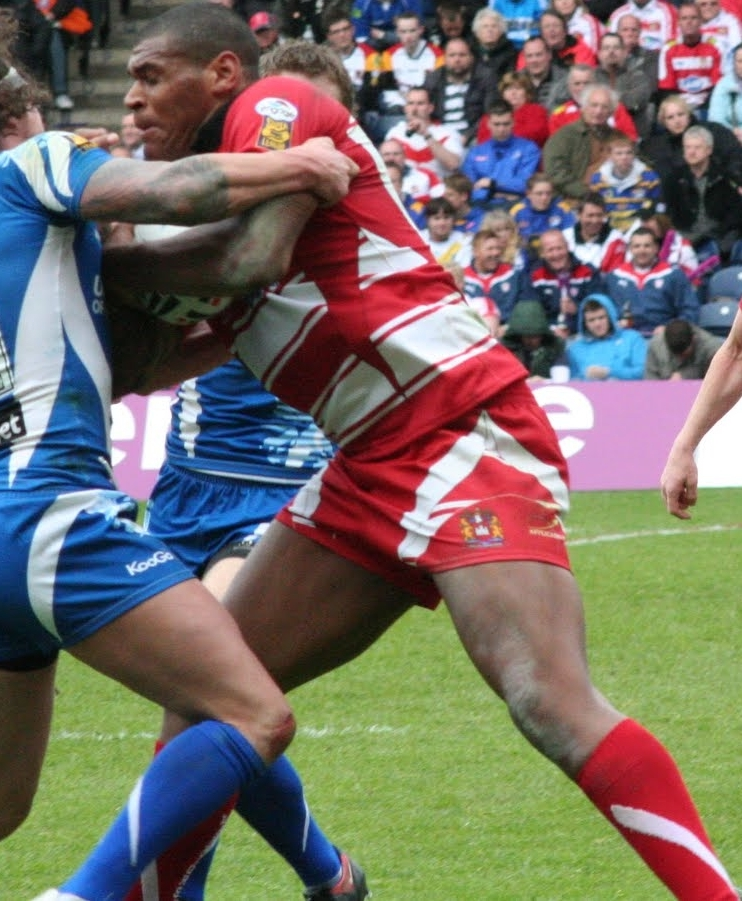

Personal information
- Born: 27 July 1986 (age 39) Bradford, Yorkshire, England

Playing information
- Height: 6 ft 7 in (2.01 m)
- Weight: 19 st 5 lb (123 kg)

Rugby league
- Position: Wing, Centre
Club
| Years | Team | Pld | T | G | FG | P |
|---|---|---|---|---|---|---|
| 2003–06 | Bradford Bulls | 48 | 33 | 1 | 0 | 190 |
| 2009–11 | Wigan Warriors | 15 | 16 | 0 | 0 | 64 |
| 2011 | Harlequins RL | 18 | 12 | 0 | 0 | 48 |
| 2012 | Bradford Bulls | 20 | 13 | 0 | 0 | 52 |
| 2013–16 | Dewsbury Rams | 77 | 27 | 0 | 0 | 108 |
| | Total | 178 | 101 | 1 | 0 | 462 |
Representative
| Years | Team | Pld | T | G | FG | P |
| 2011 | Jamaica | 2 | 0 | 0 | 0 | 0 |

Rugby union
- Position: Wing, Outside Centre
Club
| Years | Team | Pld | T | G | FG | P |
|---|---|---|---|---|---|---|
| 2006–08 | Gloucester Rugby | 13 | 7 | 0 | 0 | 0 |
- Relatives: Leon Pryce (brother); Geoff Pryce (cousin); Waine Pryce (cousin); Will Pryce (nephew)

Karl Pryce (born 27 July 1986), also known by the nicknames of "Big Karl", and "Hightower", is an English former professional rugby league footballer, best known for playing for the Bradford Bulls. His usual position was on the wing. Pryce previously played rugby league with Wigan and Harlequins RL. He also played rugby union with Gloucester.

== Background ==
Pryce was born in Bradford, West Yorkshire, England, he is the younger brother of former England and Catalans Dragons rugby league player, Leon Pryce. He is of Jamaican descent.

== Playing career ==
=== 2000s ===
He made his début at St Helens in 2003 and was outstanding as the Bradford Senior Academy took the Championship in 2004. In 2005 he continued his progress and made 21 appearances scoring 17 tries making him third in Bradford's try scoring charts for the year. As Super League champions Bradford faced National Rugby League premiers Wests Tigers in the 2006 World Club Challenge. Pryce played at stand-off half back in the Bulls' 30–10 victory.

Pryce was called up to the Great Britain squad in 2006 for the 2006 Tri nations although he did not feature in the competition.

Pryce re-fractured a bone in his left foot on his Premiership début in March 2007 and had a pin inserted in his foot. He missed the rest of the season. For the 2007–08 season, Pryce, like other England Academy players at Gloucester, was dual-registered with Moseley, and could play for either club during the season.

On 18 December 2007, Wigan announced that they had signed Pryce for the start of the new 2008 Super League Season, although he missed the majority of this season due to an ankle fracture injury, which had also hampered his time at Gloucester. On 10 December, Wigan announced Pryce's début would come in a friendly fixture against Warrington on 28 December. Wigan won 44–4, with Pryce scoring two tries.

Pryce made his return to Super League on 20 February 2009 against Castleford. Despite Castleford winning the game 22–28 Karl Pryce scored a single try. Pryce featured in the Challenge cup 4th round tie against Barrow scoring a try.

Pryce has played the majority of the season in Wigan's Reserve team. He made 14 appearances scoring 20 tries and has played in the centres, wing and stand off.

=== 2010s ===
In 2012 Mick Potter signed Pryce on a 1-year deal for the 2012 season. The 25-year-old can play Wing, Centre and Second Row.

Pryce did not feature in any of the pre-season games because of a hamstring injury.

Karl missed Rounds 1–4 due to an injury. He featured in five consecutive games from Round 6 (Hull Kingston Rovers) to Round 10 (Leeds). Pryce returned in Round 12 (Huddersfield) to Round 23 (Widnes). Pryce also played in Round 25 (Huddersfield) and Round 26 (Hull F.C.). He was injured for Round 11, 27 and Round 4 of the Challenge Cup. He also featured against Warrington in the Challenge Cup. Pryce scored against Hull Kingston Rovers (1 try), St. Helens (1 try), Hull F.C. (1 try), London Broncos (1 try), Salford (3 tries), Wigan (2 tries), Leeds (1 try), Warrington (1 try) and Huddersfield (2 tries).

He was released at the end of the season.

=== Statistics ===
| Season | Appearance | Tries | Goals | F/G | Points |
|---|---|---|---|---|---|
| 2012 Bradford | 20 | 13 | 0 | 0 | 52 |
| 2013 Dewsbury | 29 | 13 | 0 | 0 | 52 |
| 2014 Dewsbury | 24 | 7 | 0 | 0 | 28 |
| 2015 Dewsbury | 16 | 6 | 0 | 0 | 24 |
| Total | 89 | 39 | 0 | 0 | 156 |
