= Athletic Ground (Scarborough) =

Football stadium in North Yorkshire, England

Coordinates: 54°15′55.72″N 0°25′5.69″W

- McCain Stadium
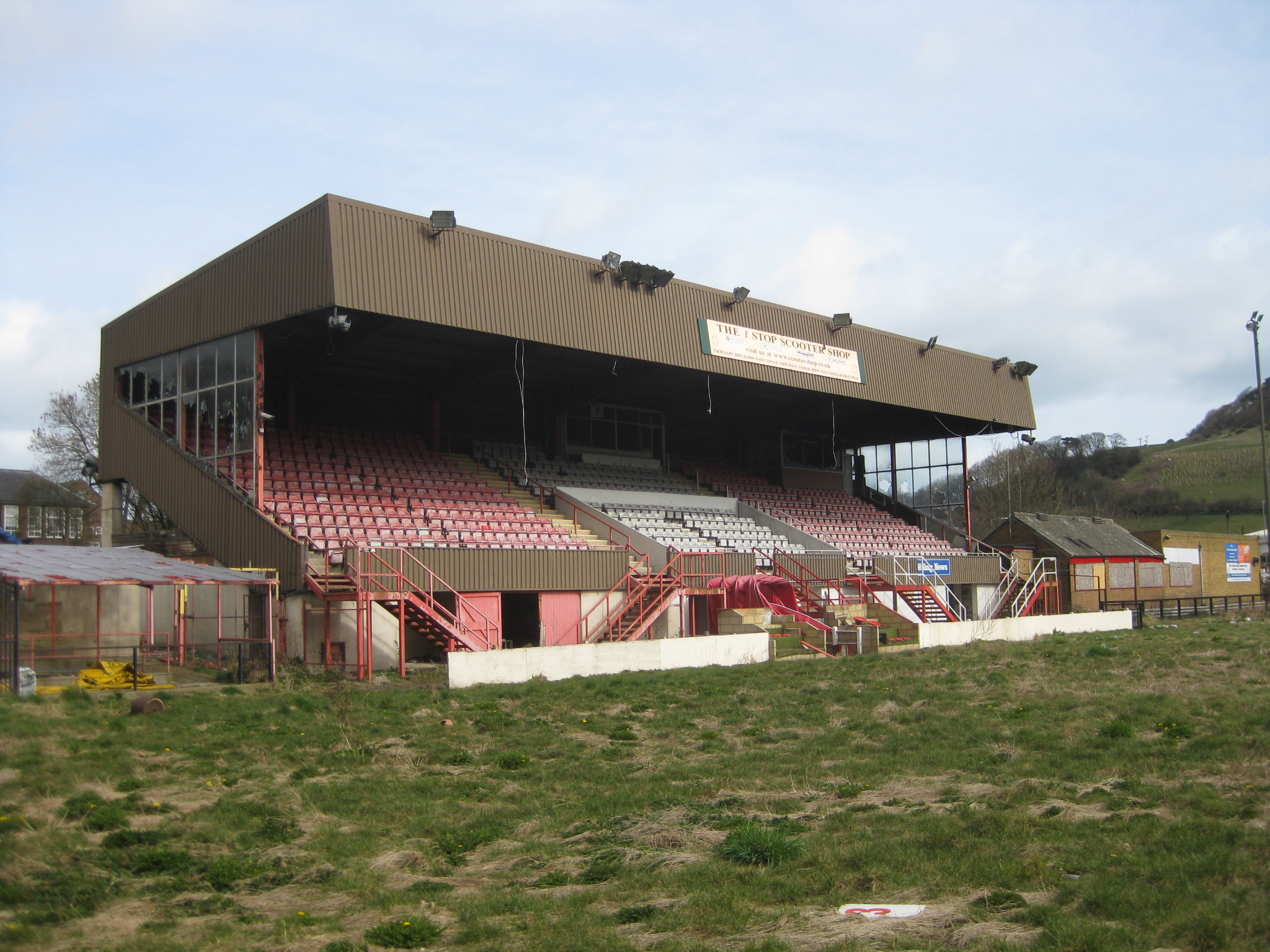
- Interactive map of Athletic Ground
- Location: Seamer Road, Scarborough, North Yorkshire, YO12 4HF
- Capacity: 6,408

Construction
- Opened: 1898
- Closed: 2007
- Demolished: 2011

The Athletic Ground, latterly known as the McCain Stadium, was a football stadium located on Seamer Road in Scarborough, North Yorkshire, England. It was the home of Scarborough F.C., a defunct football club who last played in the English Conference North before they were dissolved on 20 June 2007 with debts of £2.5 million.

== History ==
The stadium hosted league football from 1987, when the club won promotion to the Football League, until relegation in 1999. Although Scarborough's 12 seasons in the league were all spent in the fourth tier, the stadium hosted several cup ties against teams from the top two divisions. The first league match hosted Wolverhampton Wanderers.

The venue was first opened in 1898, when Scarborough F.C. moved from playing at Scarborough Cricket Club. In 1988, under a sponsorship deal, the club sold the naming rights of the Athletic Ground to McCain Foods and, until its closure in 2007, the stadium was known as the McCain Stadium. Due to the sponsor, the ground was nicknamed the "Theatre of Chips".

The ground was the venue for twenty-four Scarborough fixtures, that had in excess of 6,000 spectators. The biggest attendance was in January 1938, vs Luton Town in the FA Cup, the crowd recorded was 11,162.

The stadium hosted games between Scarborough FC and illustrious names such as Arsenal, Chelsea (twice), Portsmouth, Southampton (twice), Bolton Wanderers, Fulham, Middlesbrough, Coventry City, Crystal Palace, Brighton and Hove Albion & Bradford City in cup ties, whilst also hosting a series of league clashes with Yorkshire rivals York City and Hull City more often in league fixtures. Scarborough's first game in the Football League vs Wolverhampton Wanderers, attended by a crowd of 7,314 on 15 August 1987, was marred by crowd trouble.

Scarborough played Red Star Belgrade in a friendly at the stadium in July 1990, which Red Star won 4–2. Red Star subsequently won the European Cup the following season.

The arena had dual usage in the 1991–92, when the short-lived rugby league club Scarborough Pirates played at the ground, but only four games had crowds in excess of 1,000 and the club was disbanded after just a single season. Baseball was another sport played at the ground and for a single season in 1936, the 'Scarborough Seagulls' attracted crowds of up to 1,500 people. The stadium also hosted a floodlit cricket match in September 1980, when a Brian Close XI defeated Scarborough by 26 runs, in front of a 2,000 crowd.

The ground was used briefly for Greyhound racing on Tuesday nights, during the summer months of July & August, in the early 1960s. The course length being 250-285 yards. The first meeting attracted a crowd of 3,500.

Scarborough RUFC played its home games at the stadium during the club's inaugural season of 1926–27. 1000+ attendances at matches persuaded the club to move away from the ground after just one season to the Old Showground, and ultimately Silver Royd, Scalby. The Rugby club still played the occasional 'Hospital Shield' match at the Athletic Ground and also their 1951 Silver Jubilee game, which attracted a crowd of 1,800.

The stadium became vacant in June 2007 when Scarborough FC went out of business and the new Scarborough Athletic club initially played outside the town. Demolition of the stadium took place four years later.

The gates at the entrance to the ground were preserved.

A Lidl supermarket was built on the site and opened 16 February 2017.

== Layout ==
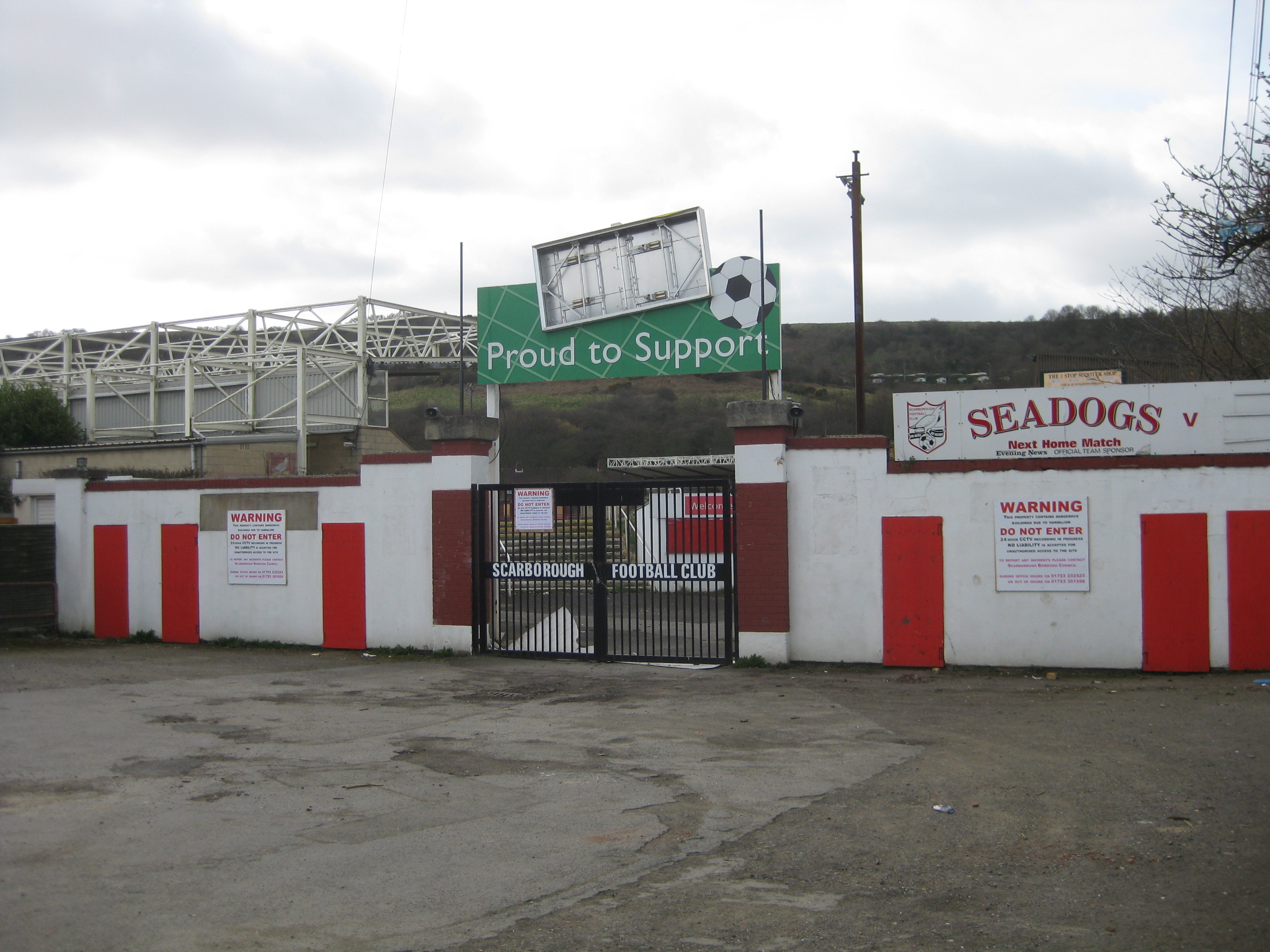
The gates at the entrance to the old stadium.

The ground had four main stands:

Main Stand

The Main Stand ran along one side of the pitch. It was an old grandstand-style stand and was all seater.

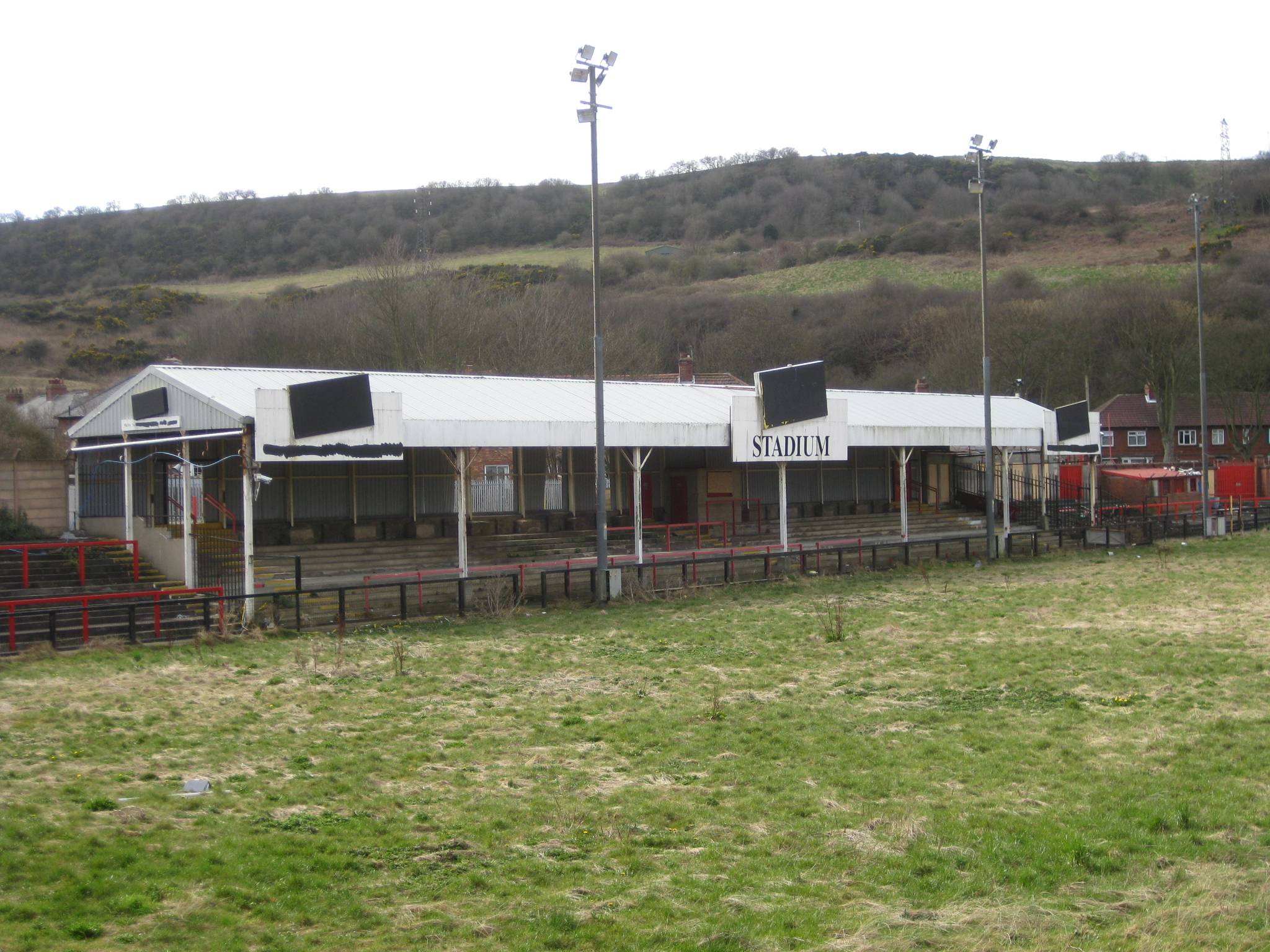
The former Shed end

The Shed (Also known as "The Cow Shed")

The Shed ran along the other side of the pitch and was covered terracing. This was the most popular part of the ground and was usually where the singing supporters stood.

The East Stand

The East Stand was behind one of the goals and was an all seater stand in which the seats were red and the letters SFC were spelled out in white seats. This was the newest part of the ground along with The West Stand.

The West Stand

The West Stand was identical to The East Stand but was behind the other goal. It was where the away fans were located.

Corners

In three of the four corners of the ground there was uncovered terracing although the north-west corner had become overrun with grass and weeds so was not normally used. The other corner of the ground was two-step terracing in front of the social club.

Shops and Food

In the north-east corner of the ground there was a social club, known as the McCain Lounge, and a club shop which was located in a hut. There was also a programme shop, food outlet and coffee hut.

== 2006 plans ==
In March 2006 the plan was for a new stadium to be completed well before the start of the 2007–08 season. The stadium was to be located in Eastfield, Scarborough. The planned capacity was around 4,000 and the amount of land that the club would own was 15 acres (61,000 m^{2}) of which some would have been used for the stadium, with room for expansion, and the rest used to lease to offices etc. that would cover the club's operating losses. The McCain Stadium was to be sold to property developers (Persimmon Homes) for around £4.1 million and this would have been enough to pay off all of the club's debts and fund the new stadium.

== Demise of Scarborough FC ==
A covenant existed on the McCain Stadium that restricted its use only to sporting activities. Scarborough F.C. failed to convince the Scarborough Borough Council that its proposals to sell the McCain Stadium to a housing developer would raise enough money to both to pay off the debts and build a new ground.

On Tuesday 12 June, Scarborough F.C. were given an eight-day 'stay of execution' following a 'change of heart' by their local Borough Council. But, on 20 June, they were wound up in the High Court, ending its 128-year run as a club with debts of £2.5 million.

However, the winding up of Scarborough F.C. paved the way for the supporters' trust to form a new club as Scarborough Athletic F.C. and secure a place in the Northern Counties East League, Division One with effect from 2007 to 2008.

== Subsequent events ==
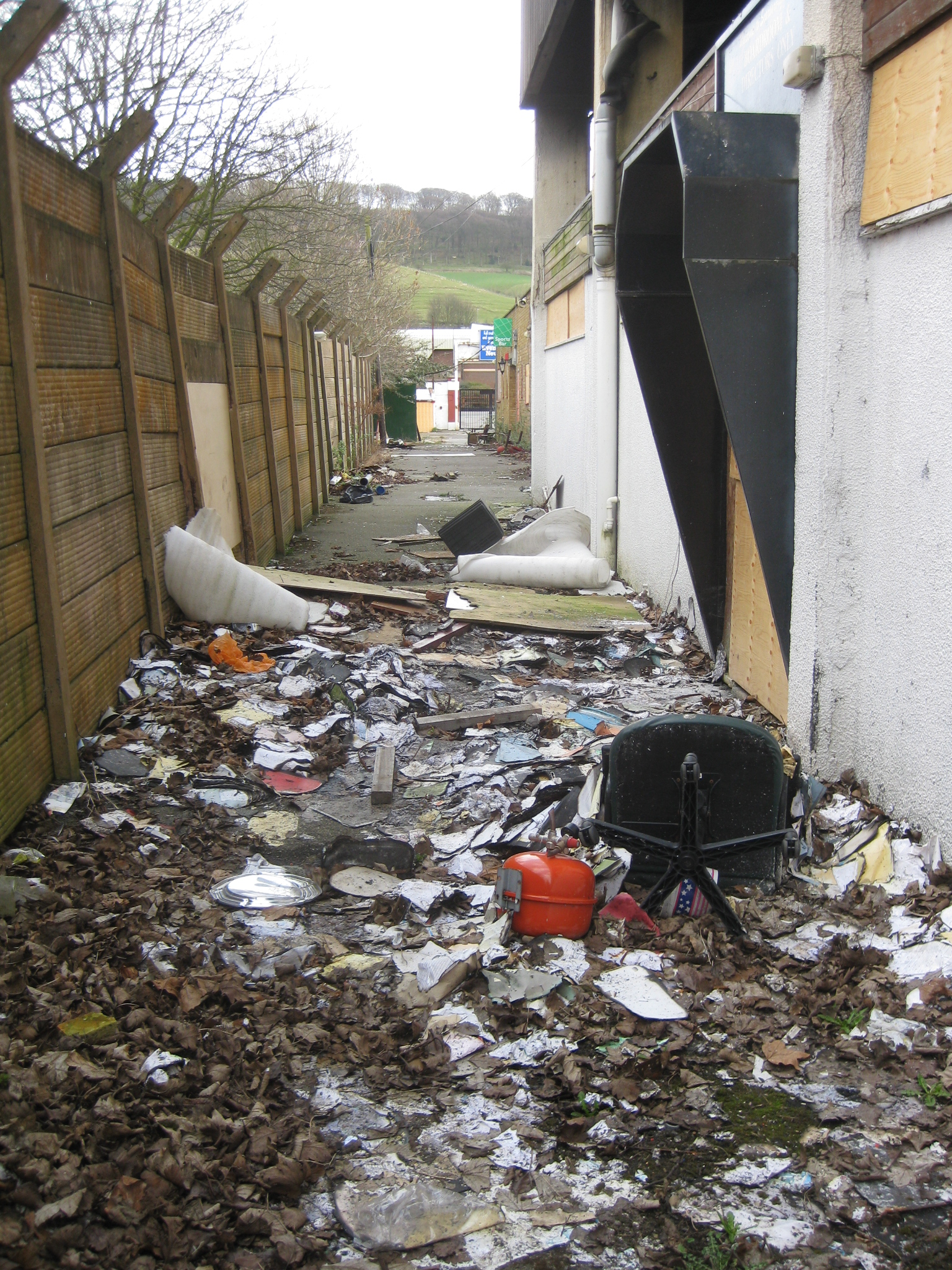
Rubbish littering the boarded up and deserted stadium

On 26 September 2007, Scarborough Borough Council announced its intention to purchase the ground from the liquidators. The liquidators, Begbies Traynor, applied to have the covenant lifted. This was contested by the council. As a result, the stadium remained empty and derelict, and was subject to vandalism.

The stadium was damaged by a fire on 17 October 2008, that started in the changing rooms. A director of Scarborough Athletic criticised administrators Begbies Traynor for the lack of security. He said that the club would be interested in moving back to the stadium but that the vandalism was making that option more difficult and expensive. In December 2008 the Council finally purchased the ground from the liquidators.

On 15 December 2009, the council announced that it had decided to invest money in a new facility rather than regenerate the stadium.

On 13 March 2010 Scarborough Council stated it was about to discuss demolition work at the stadium. Further discussions took place in April 2011 and on 13 April 2011 the Council voted to demolish the stadium. It was also revealed that Featherstone Rovers RLFC had agreed to purchase the East and West stands and undertake the demolition works that the council required for nil cost.

On 19 September 2011 bulldozers finally moved in to begin the demolition of the ground, completing the task in late November 2011.

On 13 August 2015 Scarborough Borough Council granted planning permission for a Lidl supermarket to be built on the by now flattened site. It opened its doors on 16 February 2017.
