= Derek Smart (rugby league) =

English rugby league footballer

Playing information
- Position: Wing
Club
| Years | Team | Pld | T | G | FG | P |
|---|---|---|---|---|---|---|
| 1953–60 | Castleford | 84 | 50 | 0 | 0 | 150 |
| 1960 | Wakefield Trinity | 1 | 1 | 0 | 0 | 3 |
| | Total | 85 | 51 | 0 | 0 | 153 |

Derek Smart is a former professional rugby league footballer who played in the 1950s and 1960s. He played at club level for Castleford, and Wakefield Trinity, as a wing.

== Playing career ==
=== Club career ===
Derek Smart made his début for Wakefield Trinity during January 1960, and he played his last match for Wakefield Trinity during the 1959–60 season.
