= Scarborough Pirates =

Defunct English rugby league club, based in Scarborough, Yorkshire

Club information
- Full name: Scarborough Pirates RLFC
- Nickname: The Pirates
- Founded: 1991; 35 years ago
- Exited: 1992; 34 years ago

Former details
- Ground: McCain Stadium (6,408)

Scarborough Pirates RLFC were a rugby league club based in Scarborough, North Yorkshire, England. They played their home games at Scarborough F.C.'s McCain Stadium.

== History ==
In December 1990, Scarborough announced an intention to apply for membership of the RFL. Scarborough Pirates RLFC were admitted as a member club in January 1991; getting exactly the minimum number of votes required. The chairman was Geoffrey Richmond, who also was the Chairman of Scarborough F.C. Leonard "Len" Casey was Head Coach, and Peter Smith was the captain.

Scarborough played their first competitive game on Sunday 25 August 1991 away to Doncaster in a Yorkshire County Cup preliminary round match. Scarborough won 14–10 in front of 1,080 spectators.

Scarborough started the season well and finished ninth in the newly formed fourteen-club Third Division with ten wins and fourteen defeats. However, attendances at the McCain Stadium were poor; with only four of their fourteen home matches attracting crowds of over 1,000. In June 1992, it was revealed that they were in debt to the sum of £113,000. Richmond disbanded the club after just one season citing a lack of local interest. The official club timekeeper was Les Croxford, who at the time was the Chairman of Scarborough All Blacks ARLFC.

== Notable former players ==
- Brendan Carlyle (York→Scarborough 1992→Hull→Doncaster)
- Leonard "Len" Casey
- Richard "Dick" Fairbank (Halifax→Scarborough)
- Kenny Hill
- Shaun Patrick (Hull→Scarborough)
- Gary Pearce
- Steve Robinson (Hull Kingston Rovers→Scarborough)
- Peter Smith
- Ray Stead (York→Hull Kingston Rovers→Scarborough)
- Alan Tomlinson (Hull→Scarborough)
