= Wigginton Road Cricket Ground =

Former cricket ground in York, England

Coordinates: 53°58′17″N 1°5′1″W

Wigginton Road Cricket Ground in York is a former cricket ground. Its one and only first-class match was held in June 1890 between Yorkshire and Kent.

The ground was then known as the Yorkshire Gentlemen Cricket Club Ground, having been used by the Yorkshire Gentlemen from its inception in 1864 to 1931. Its name was changed in 1933 to Wigginton Road and was used from 1932 to 1966 by York Cricket Club.

Wigginton Road Cricket Ground is now covered by York Hospital which lies to the west side of Wiggington Road.

== Cricket ==
Yorkshire won the solitary first class match by 8 wickets after bowling Kent out for 46 in their first innings with three Kent players, somewhat bizarrely as it was the first innings of the game, denoted as "absent injured" when they failed to turn up for the game. Prince Albert Victor, Queen Victoria's grandson, attended the match. The ground was used for Yorkshire Second XI matches until the late 1950s but in 1966 the hospital authorities which owned the site announced that it would be redeveloped. The final game took place on 3 September 1966.

== Rugby ==
For a short period in the 1880s York F.C used the ground to play rugby before financial problems forced a move away.
