= Graham Steadman =

Professional RL coach & former GB international rugby league footballer

Personal information
- Born: 8 December 1961 (age 64) Knottingley, West Riding of Yorkshire, England

Playing information
- Position: Fullback, Stand-off
Club
Years	Team	Pld	T	G	FG	P
1982	Huddersfield	1	0	0	0	0
1982–86	York	97	63	253	14	762
1986–89	Featherstone Rovers	96	48	76	6	350
1989	Gold Coast	5	1	0	0	4
1989–97	Castleford	237	121	174	8	840
	Total	436	233	503	28	1956
Representative
Years	Team	Pld	T	G	FG	P
1985–91	Yorkshire	4	2	4	0	16
1990–94	Great Britain	10	3	3	0	18

Coaching information

Rugby league
Club
Years	Team	Gms	W	D	L	W%
2001–04	Castleford Tigers	89	36	3	50	40
2025–	Newcastle Thunder	37	22	0	15	59
	Total	126	58	3	65	46

Rugby union
Club
Years	Team	Gms	W	D	L	W%
2021–23	Hull Ionians
- Source: As of 26 September 2026

Graham Steadman (born 8 December 1961) is an English professional rugby league coach who is the head coach of the Newcastle Thunder in the RFL Championship and an assistant coach at the York Knights in the Super League.

He is a former professional rugby league footballer who played in the 1980s and 1990s, and coached in the 2000s. He played at representative level for Great Britain and Yorkshire, and at club level for York Wasps, Featherstone Rovers, Gold Coast-Tweed Giants and Castleford, as a goal-kicking fullback or stand-off, and coached at club level for the Castleford Tigers.

== Early life ==
Born in Knottingley, Steadman started his career in rugby union, playing for his hometown club Knottingley RUFC.

== Playing career ==
=== York ===
Steadman switched codes to rugby league in 1982. He made an appearance for Huddersfield as a trialist, but later chose to sign for York.

He helped York win promotion to the First Division in the 1984–85 season, and was named the Second Division Player of the Year.

Steadman holds York's "Most points in a season" record with 318-points scored in the 1984–85 season, beating Vic Yorke's 301-points set in the 1957–58 season.

=== Featherstone Rovers ===
Steadman was transferred to Featherstone Rovers in February 1986 for a fee of £50,000.

He played in the 1987–88 Second Division Premiership final at Old Trafford against Oldham, scoring two tries, but the team went on to lose 26–28.

=== Castleford ===
Castleford paid a then world transfer record of £170,000 for Graham Steadman when he moved from Featherstone Rovers in 1989.

Graham Steadman played at stand-off in Castleford's 11–8 victory over Wakefield Trinity in the 1990–91 Yorkshire Cup Final during the 1990–91 season at Elland Road, Leeds on 23 September 1990.

At the start of the 1991–92 season, Steadman switched positions from stand-off to fullback. The position change was successful, and he scored two tries and four goals in the club's 28–6 victory over Bradford Northern in the 1991–92 Yorkshire Cup Final at Elland Road, Leeds on 20 October 1991. He also helped Castleford reach the 1991–92 Challenge Cup final, but suffered a 12–28 defeat against Wigan at Wembley on 2 May 1992. At the end of the season, he was named the First Division Player of the Year, but narrowly missed out on the Man of Steel award to Dean Bell.

Graham Steadman played fullback in Castleford's 33–2 victory over Wigan in the 1993–94 Regal Trophy Final during the 1993–94 season at Headingley, Leeds on 22 January 1994.

=== Representative honours ===
Graham Steadman won a cap for Yorkshire while at Featherstone Rovers; during the 1988–89 season as an interchange/substitute against Lancashire, and he won caps for Yorkshire while at Castleford playing stand-off, and scoring 2-tries, and 4-goals in the 56–12 victory over Lancashire at Wigan's stadium on 20 September 1989, and as a substitute in the 17–12 victory over Lancashire at Leeds' stadium on 18 September 1991.

Graham Steadman won caps for Great Britain while at Castleford in 1990 against France, in 1992 against France, in 1992 in the 1989–1992 Rugby League World Cup against France, in 1992 against Australia (2 matches), in 1992 in the 1989–1992 Rugby League World Cup against Australia, in 1992 against New Zealand (2 matches), and in 1994 against France, and Australia.

== Coaching career ==
=== Castleford Tigers ===
Steadman was made full-time coach of the Castleford Tigers towards the end of 2001 after Stuart Raper left for Wigan. Steadman took the club to the top 6 playoffs in 2002 and then the club finished 8th in 2003. 2004 saw his worst year as coach when the club failed to win any games under Steadman. A lot of people blamed the board for not backing him with money to spend.

=== Newcastle Thunder ===
He took over as head coach of Newcastle Thunder on 21 June 2025 following the departure of Chris Thorman

== Honoured at Castleford ==
Graham Steadman is a Castleford Hall of Fame Inductee.

Achievements
Preceded by Garry Schofield	Rugby League Transfer Record; Featherstone Rovers to Castleford; 1989-1991	Succeeded by Ellery Hanley
