= York Wasps =

English defunct rugby league club, based in York, England

Club information
- Full name: York Wasps Rugby League Football Club
- Nickname: Wasps
- Founded: 1868; 158 years ago
- Exited: 2002; 24 years ago

Former details
- Ground: Clarence Street, 1885–1989 Huntington Stadium, 1989–2002

Uniforms
Home colours

The York Wasps (known simply as York from 1868 to 1989, Ryedale-York from 1989 to 1996 and York Wasps from 1996 to 2002) was an English professional rugby league club based in York. At the start of the 2002 season, the club was dissolved. A new club, York City Knights was established to take the Wasps' place for the 2003 season.

== History ==
=== Early years ===
The club was first formed as "York Football Club" in 1868 and played both association and rugby football, for the first few seasons they had portable goal posts as they did not have their own ground and would play wherever they could find a pitch. Eventually a permanent pitch was secured on Knavesmire. Other early grounds included Clifton Ings and Poad's Field.

It took three years for the club to record their first victory, and that was in an association football match against York Training College. Results picked up in the mid-1870s as the club attracted a higher standard of player. In 1877, York were among several leading Yorkshire clubs who inaugurated the Yorkshire Challenge Cup. In the first season 16 teams battled it out for the T'owd Tin Pot, with York eventually losing out to Halifax in the final.

In 1883 the club moved to the Wigginton Road Cricket Ground of the Yorkshire Gentlemen and also amalgamated with York Melbourne Club. In 1884, they were asked to leave the ground due to financial problems and spoiling the playing surface. The club moved to Grange St (Fishergate).

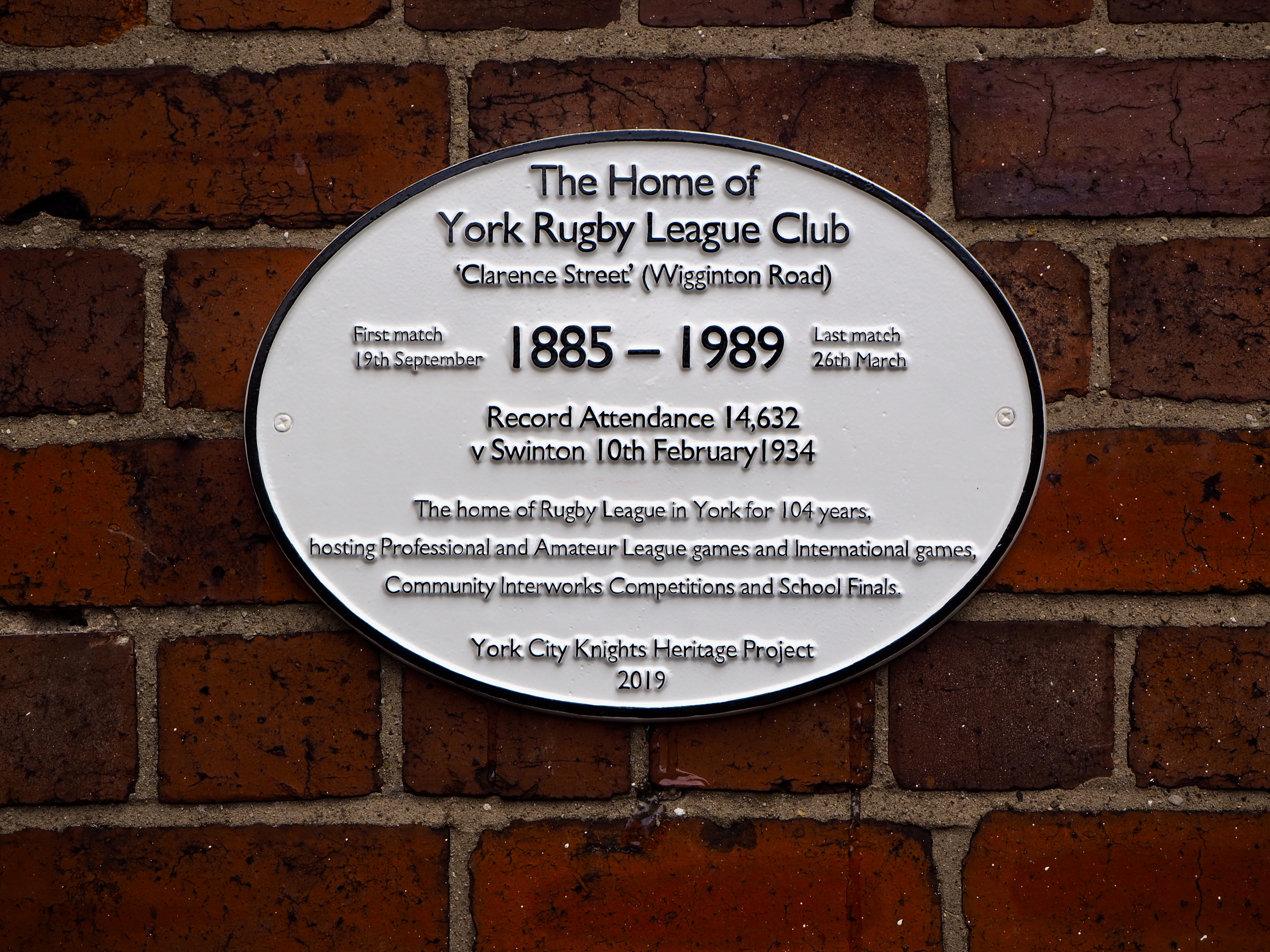
Commemorative plaque near the site of the Clarence Street ground

In 1885, the club leased a plot of land from the York Lunatic (Bootham) Asylum at the end of the Clarence Street in 1885. The first game at the new site was between a York XV and 20 players from the city on 19 September 1885.

The club made great strides with the team of 1895, which won virtually all their home matches. Off the field the club paid £85 for the Waterman's Mission Hut in Fishergate and converted it into their first grandstand, incorporating dressing rooms. Previously players had changed, first at the Adelphi Hotel (later The Railway King) on George Hudson St and later at Shorts Baths (Clarence St).

=== Northern Union ===
Northern rugby teams broke away from the Rugby Football Union to form their own Northern Union in 1895. York initially stayed with the Rugby Football Union but as more and more clubs began to join the new order, it became a financial necessity to follow suit. The decision to join the Northern Union was taken at a meeting at the Bar Hotel, Micklegate, on Monday, 25 April 1898 and five days later they played their first Northern Union match against Hull Kingston Rovers losing 29–2.

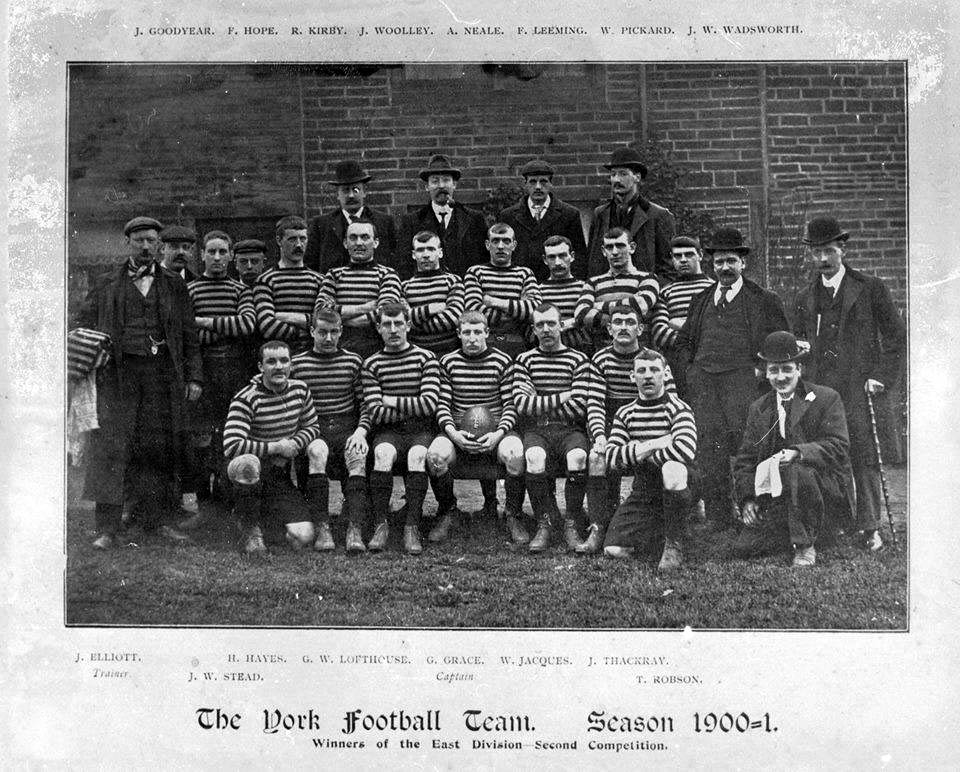
Team of 1900–01 season

The York club was first admitted to the Rugby Football League in 1901. In 1902/03 the Lancashire and Yorkshire leagues were combined to form a second division. They defeated the touring All Golds team in 1908. York was one of the new teams to join the second division. After the First World War, they became known as "the Dreadnoughts". They beat the visiting Australasian team of the 1921–22 Kangaroo tour of Great Britain 9–3. York played touring teams on a number of occasions between 1908 and 1978. There were 8 games against Australia (one win and one draw) and 6 games against New Zealand (3 wins).

Arguably York's best moment came in 1931 when they reached the Challenge Cup Final for the first time, only to be beaten 22–8 by Halifax. York had finished as the top Yorkshire club in 1932–33 for the first time and fourth in the league to qualify for the Championship play-offs but were beaten by Swinton. In the 1922/3 season, York beat Batley 5–0 in the Yorkshire Cup final held at Headingley before a giant crowd of 33,719. In 1933, York beat Hull Kingston Rovers 10–4 in the Yorkshire Cup final held at Headingley. 10 February 1934, York's record attendance was set when 14,689 turned up to watch a Challenge Cup match against Swinton, which ended in a 0–0 draw.

York again made the final of the Yorkshire Cup in 1935 but were beaten by Leeds 3–0 at Thrum Hall, Halifax but were back the next year this time beating Wakefield Trinity 9–2 in a final held at Headingley. They also lost the 1978 final to Bradford Northern by 18–8.

Bill Kirkbride became coach in 1980. York team lifted the Division Two title in 1980–81, beating Hunslet 53–7 to guarantee themselves the title with two games to spare, finishing above big-guns Wigan and newly formed Fulham. Kirkbride left in 1982. Immediate relegation was followed by promotion in 1985.

Financial problems forced the club to sell their training pitch (behind The Popular Stand) for £200,000 in 1986. Three years later faced with a large bill for safety work, the rest of the stadium was sold to a housing developer for £705,000, less than half what the ground was worth. On 26 March 1989 York's last match at Clarence Street produced a 26–17 victory over Hunslet in front of a crowd of 2,904 spectators.

=== Ryedale-York ===
Gary Stephens became coach in 1988. When plans to ground share with York City F.C. broke down, York moved to the newly constructed Ryedale Stadium two miles to the north of the city at Huntington in Ryedale district. As the stadium was financed by Ryedale District Council the club became known as Ryedale-York. The first league game at the new stadium was on 8 October 1989 against Keighley. Ryedale Stadium's record attendance for a rugby league match was set on 5 January 1990 when 4,977 turned up to watch a division two match against Halifax.

In 1991, Ryedale-York and Fulham toured Russia, an act that caused many Russian rugby union clubs to switch to rugby league. Stephens left as coach.

Ryedale-York were demoted to the Third Division in 1992 having finished seventh in the Second Division. The next year, they were back in the Second Division as the league returned to a two division structure with the bulk of Third Division sides joining the new Second Division.

Stuart Horton took over the coaching reins from Roger Millward in January 1995. Ryedale-York conceived a 'Super League plan' with Gateshead Council in 1995 with the intention of moving to Gateshead. The club's last game as Ryedale-York took place in April, an away game against Carlisle that was played in Gateshead. The relocation never came to pass and owing to a change in local council boundaries, Huntington, was now a civil parish in the newly formed unitary authority of the City of York. The newly renamed York Wasps playing at the Huntington stadium were confirmed as being in the Second Division which was now the third tier of rugby league, on 30 April.

=== York Wasps ===
York were beaten by amateur side West Hull 10–6 in the Challenge Cup on Humberside on a frozen pitch, in the 1996 Challenge Cup. They became the first professional side to lose to an amateur club in the fourth round, and it was only the third time a minnow had triumphed against a giant in the event since the Second World War. Horton was sacked at the end of 1996 for alleged gross misconduct after the postponement of a friendly fixture at Hull.

Dean Robinson was appointed Coach for the 1997 Season with York Wasps in Division 2. In Season 1998 York won promotion under Robinson into Division 1. However, in 1999 both divisions were brought together as the Northern Ford Premiership, with York finishing 7th in the newly formatted division.

York won one game in the Northern Ford Premiership in 2000 and finished the campaign with a team of amateurs after almost folding. Due to financial difficulties and problems with training facilities coach Dean Robinson resigned in the early part of the season in March 2000. Caretaker coach Garry Atkins took over for three months and tried to manage the team with the club in grave difficulties.

Lee Crooks took over as coach in August 2000. They attracted sponsorship from the New York Economic Development Council for the 2001 season. This promised, but did not deliver, a bright future. Lee Crooks resigned and academy coach Martin Flynn took charge for the final Northern Ford Premiership home game.

York made an unsuccessful approach to buy the London Broncos in August 2001 and form a merged club under a new name, York Wasps Ltd, to play in Super League. Australian Leo Epifania came over to England to be head coach of York Wasps in September.

On 19 March 2002, after completing 11 games, York Wasps announced that they had folded. After a last-ditch take-over deal to save the Wasps collapses, the RFL accept the club's resignation on 26 March 2002. Less than a fortnight earlier, the club had defeated Chorley Lynx 34–22 to record their first victory in 13 months ending a run of 25 winless games.

Head coach, Leo Epifania quit England but York players continued to train with the idea of playing later in the season under unpaid caretaker-boss Stuart Horton. A supporters' trust working party was formed on 27 March 2002 and applied to the RFL to continue the 2002 Northern Ford Premiership fixtures. After hearing it would be impossible to meet requirements to return that season, on 5 May 2002 fans backed new proposals for a new club to apply for admittance to the league for 2003, and a new club, York City Knights, was subsequently established.

== Players ==
=== Players earning international caps while at York ===
- Barry Banks won caps for England while at York in 1979 France (sub)
- Craig Booth won caps for Scotland while at York in 1998 I(i)reland, F(f)rance
- Edgar Dawson won caps for Great Britain while at York in 1956 1-cap
- Norman Fender (No.11/No.12) won caps for Wales (RU) while at Cardiff RFC in 1930 against Ireland and France, and in 1931 against England, Scotland, France and Ireland, represented Great Britain (RL) while at York on the 1932/33 tour to Australasia playing in 14 tour (non-Test matches), scoring 11-tries, and won caps for Wales (RL) while at York 1932...1938 9-caps.[2]
- Harry Field won caps for Great Britain while at York in 1936 Australia, New Zealand (2 matches)
- Lee Hanlan won caps for Ireland while at York in 1996 S(s)cotland, in 1997 F(f)rance
- Arthur Lloyd won a cap for Wales while at York in 1931 1-cap
- Neil Lowe won caps for Scotland while at Featherstone Rovers, Doncaster, York and Keighley 1999...present 3-caps + 4-caps (sub)
- F. W. Oliver (No.4) won caps for England while at York (1907...1914 Pld=204 T=48 G=26 P=196) in 1909 against Wales
- Gary Pearce won caps for Wales while at Scarborough Pirates in 1991 against Papua New Guinea, in 1992 against France, and while at Ryedale-York in 1992 against France. 1991...1992 1(3?)-caps + 3-caps (sub) (3-goals? 1-drop-goal? 7-points?)
- Dai Prosser won caps for Wales (RU) while at Glynneath RFC in 1934 against Scotland, and Ireland, won caps for Wales (RL) while at York, and Leeds 1936...1944 8-caps, and won a cap for Great Britain (RL) while at Leeds in 1937 against Australia at Fartown Ground, Huddersfield
- Mel Rosser won caps for Wales while at Leeds (2-caps), and York (3-caps) 1926...1933, 5-caps 3-caps 2-tries
- George E. Saddington won caps for England while at Hull Kingston Rovers in 1934 Australia, while at York (1933...1934 Pld=144 T=3 G=10 P=29) in 1934 against France
- Geoff Smith won caps for Great Britain while at York in 1963–64 3-caps
- Jeff Stevenson won caps for Great Britain while at Leeds in 1955 New Zealand (3 matches), in 1956 Australia (3 matches), in 1957 France (4 matches), Australia, New Zealand, France (2 matches), in 1958 France, while at York in 1959 Australia (2 matches), in 1960 France (2 matches) (World Cup in 1957 3-caps 1-try).
- Mick Sullivan won caps for England while at Huddersfield in 1955 Other Nationalities, in 1956 France, while at St. Helens in 1962 France, and won caps for Great Britain while at Huddersfield in 1954 France (2 matches), New Zealand, Australia, in 1955 New Zealand (3 matches), in 1956 Australia (3 matches), in 1957 France (3 matches), France, Australia, New Zealand, while at Wigan France (2 matches), in 1958 France, Australia (3 matches), New Zealand (2 matches), in 1959 France (2 matches), Australia (3 matches), in 1960 France (3 matches), France, New Zealand, Australia, while at St. Helens in 1961 France, New Zealand (2 matches), in 1962 France (3 matches), Australia (3 matches), New Zealand, while at York in 1963 Australia (World Cup in 1954 3-caps, 1-try, in 1957 3-caps, 3-tries, in 1960 3-caps, 1-try)
- Billy Thomas won a cap for Wales while at York in 1931 1-cap
- Dick Wallace won a cap for Wales while at York in the 1975 Rugby League World Cup against France
- Basil Watts won caps for England while at York in 1953 Other Nationalities, and won caps for Great Britain while at York in 1954 France (2 matches), New Zealand, Australia, in 1955 New Zealand (World Cup in 1954 4-caps)
- Les White won caps for England while at York in 1946 France (2 matches), Wales (2 matches), in 1947 France (2 matches), Wales, while at Wigan in 1947 Wales, in 1948 France, while at Halifax in 1951 Wales, and won caps for Great Britain while at York in 1946 Australia (3 matches), New Zealand, while at Wigan in 1947 New Zealand (2 matches)

=== Hall of Fame ===
Launched in 2013, the following players have been inducted into the York Rugby League Hall of Fame. To be considered for inclusion, a player must have spent at least four seasons at the club, and be retired for more than five years.

- Alan Pallister
- Graham Sullivan
- Geoff Pryce
- Vic Yorke
- Willie Hargreaves
- Gary Smith (rugby league, York born)
- Norman Fender
- Basil Watts
- Edgar Dawson
- Charlie Taylor
- Geoff Hunter
- Kevin Harkin
- Graham Steadman
- Rich Hayes

=== Legends Roster ===
Launched in 2015, the following were original inductees of the York Rugby League Legends roster.

- Spen Allison (admin)
- Gary Atkins
- Jim Bone (physio / admin)
- Danny Brough
- Mark Cain
- Mick Cook
- David Dunkerley
- Stu Evans
- Steve Ferres
- Kevin Harkin
- Rich Hayes
- Geoff Hunter
- Paul McDermott
- Geoff Pryce
- Mick Ramsden
- Scott Rhodes
- Danny Sheehan
- Gary Smith
- Graham Steadman
- Chris Thorman

== Past Coaches ==
Also see Category:York Wasps coaches

- Tommy Harris 1960s
- Malcolm Dixon 1975–78
- Bill Kirkbride 1980–81
- Alan Hardisty 1982
- Phil Lowe 1983–7
- Danny Sheehan 1987–8
- Gary Stephens 1988–91
- Derek Foster 1992
- Steve Crooks 1993
- Roger Millward
- Stuart Horton 1995–6
- Dean Robinson 1997–2000
- Gary Atkins 2000
- Lee Crooks 2000–1
- Martin Flynn 2001
- Leo Epifania 2001–2002
- Stuart Horton

== Seasons ==
=== Super League era ===
Season	League									Play-offs	Challenge Cup	Other competitions	Name	Tries	Name	Points
Season	Division	P	W	D	L	F	A	Pts	Pos	Play-offs	Challenge Cup	Other competitions	Top try scorer		Top point scorer	
1996	Division Two	22	9	0	13	449	603	18	8th		R4					
1997	Division Two	20	8	0	12	502	517	16	7th		R4					
1998	Division Two	20	14	0	6	476	280	28	2nd		R4					
1999	Northern Ford Premiership	28	17	1	10	569	425	35	7th		R5					
2000	Northern Ford Premiership	28	5	1	22	392	859	11	17th		R5					
2001	Northern Ford Premiership	28	1	1	26	193	1499	3	19th		R4					
For a continuation of this list see: List of York City Knights seasons

== Honours ==
- Division 2 / Championship: 1
  - 1980–81
- Yorkshire County Cup: 3
  - 1922–23, 1933–34, 1936–37

== Records ==
Match records
- Points: 30 by Jamie Benn v Oldham, 1999
- Tries: 7 by Brad Davis v Highfield 17 September 1995
- Goals: 13 by Jamie Benn v Oldham, 1999
Season records
- Tries: 35 by John Crossley, Jr., 1980–81
Biggest Win
- 84–0 against Nottingham City, 1992
Highest score against
- 98–0 at Rochdale Hornets, 8 April 2001
Biggest defeat
- 98–0 at Rochdale Hornets, 8 April 2001
Highest home attendances
- Clarence Street: 14,689 v Swinton (Challenge Cup), 10 February 1934.
- Huntington Stadium: 4,977 v Halifax (Division 2), 5 January 1990 – Then Ryedale Stadium.
