= Vic Yorke =

English rugby league footballer

Personal information
- Born: c. 1933; York, England
- Died: July 2009 (aged 75); Acomb, York, England

Playing information
- Height: 6 ft 1 in (1.85 m)
- Weight: 16 st 7 lb (105 kg)
- Position: Prop
Club
| Years | Team | Pld | T | G | FG | P |
|---|---|---|---|---|---|---|
| 1954–67 | York | 362 | 13 | 1060 (1061?) | | 2159 (2161?) |
Representative
| Years | Team | Pld | T | G | FG | P |
| 1958–59 | Yorkshire | 3 | 0 | 17 | 0 | 34 |
| 1958 | Rugby League XIII | 1 | 4 | 0 | 0 | 8 |

Vic Yorke (c. 1933 – July 2009) was an English professional rugby league footballer who played in the 1950s and 1960s. He played at representative level for Rugby League XIII and Yorkshire, and at club level for Old Priory Youth Club ARLFC and York, as a goal-kicking prop.

== Background ==
Yorke's birth was registered in York, and he died aged 75 in Acomb, York, North Yorkshire, England.

== Playing career ==
=== International honours ===
Yorke played at prop for Rugby League XIII while at York and scored four goals in 8–26 defeat by France at Knowsley Road, St. Helens on Saturday 22 November 1958.

=== County honours ===
Yorke won caps for Yorkshire while at York.

=== County Cup Final appearances ===
Yorke played at prop, and scored a goal in York's 8–15 defeat by Huddersfield in the 1957 Yorkshire Cup Final during the 1957–58 season at Headingley, Leeds on Saturday 19 October 1957.

=== Club career ===
Yorke made his début for York against Hunslet at Clarence Street, York on Monday 19 April 1954, he scored his first goal for York against Hull Kingston Rovers at Craven Park, Hull on Monday 23 August 1954, his last match for York was against Hull F.C. at Clarence Street, York on Saturday 19 November 1966.

== Career records ==
Yorke holds York's "Most points in a career" record with 2159-points, "Most goals in a career" record with 1060-goals, and "Most goals in a game" record with 11-goals against Whitehaven on Saturday 6 September 1958.

He previously held York's "Most points in a season" record with 301-points set in the 1957–58 season, broken by Graham Steadman who scored 318-points during the 1984–85 season, and the "Most goals in a season" record with 146-goals also set in the 1957–58 season, broken by Danny Brough who scored 174-goals during the 2004 season.

== Honoured at York Rugby League ==
Yorke was inducted into the York Rugby League Hall of Fame in March 2013.
