= Clarence Street =

Former rugby stadium in York, England

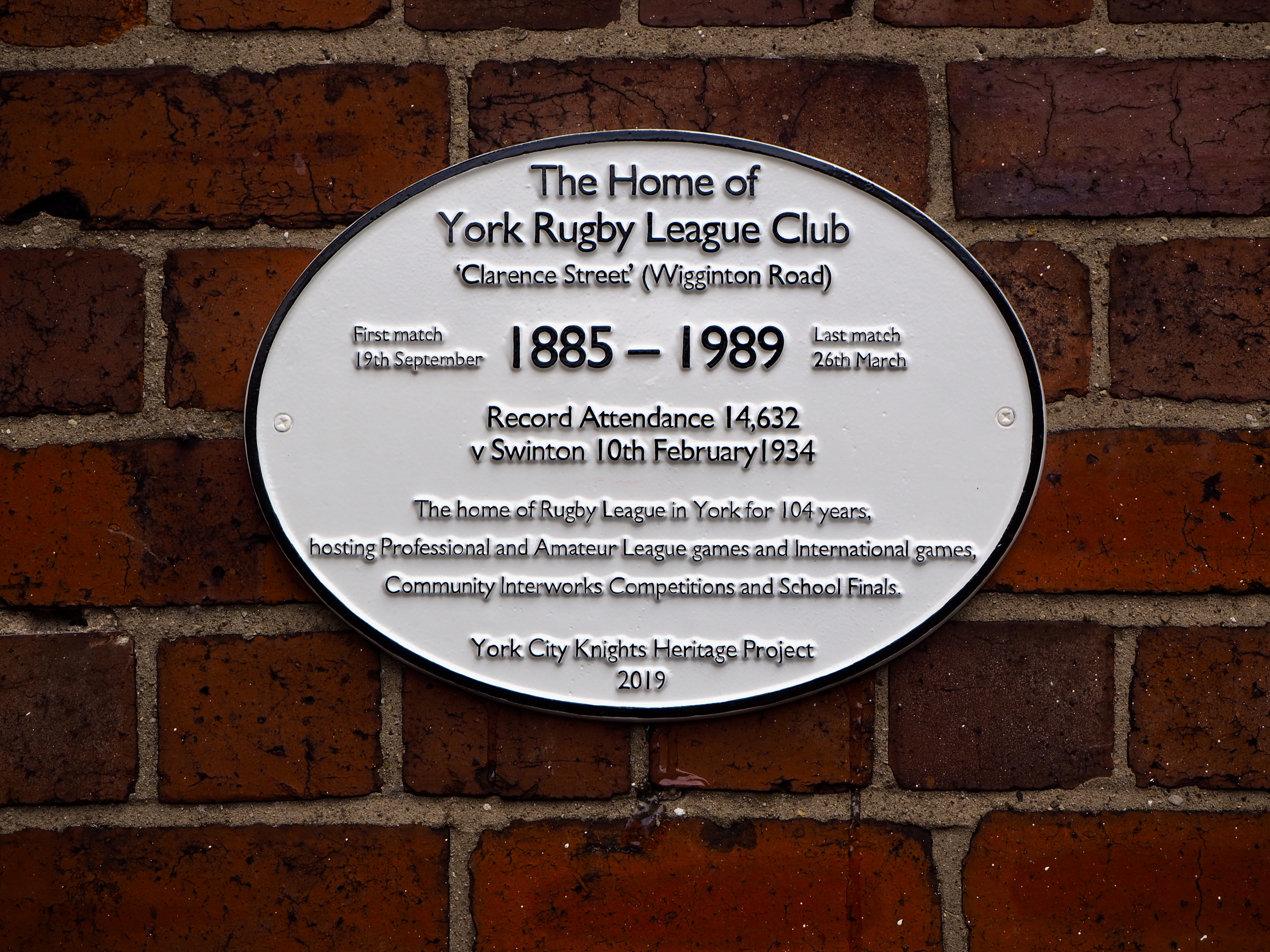
- Commemorative plaque on the site of the stadium
- Interactive map of Clarence Street
- Former names: Wigginton Road; Haxby Road
- Address: Wigginton Road, York
- Location: York, UK
- Coordinates: 53°58′12″N 1°4′51″W
- Owner: York F.C.
- Type: Rugby stadium
- Record attendance: 14,631 v Swinton (10 February 1934)

Construction
- Opened: 26 September 1885
- Closed: 26 March 1989
- Demolished: 1989

Clarence Street is a former rugby stadium in York, England. From 1885 until 1989 it was the home of York F.C. (later York R.L.F.C.) before being sold and demolished. The site is now housing.

== History ==
York Football Club was formed in 1868 and played on a variety of grounds before moving to Wigginton Road Cricket Ground in the early 1880s. In 1883 due to financial difficulties the club was forced to leave Wigginton Road but in 1885 the club leased a patch of land from Bootham Asylum. This plot of land was bounded by Wigginton Road and Haxby Street and was virtually opposite Wigginton Road cricket ground. Despite the physical location of the ground it was almost always called after nearby Clarence Street with some mentions as either Wigginton Road or Haxby Road.

The first game on the ground was between York's first XV and a team raised from the city on 19 September 1885 but the first competitive fixture was a week later against Thornes. There were no changing rooms and a local pub, the Castle Howard Ox served this purpose. Dressing rooms were added in 1896 when the club purchased the old Waterman's Mission hut and moved it from its previous location in Fishergate. York joined the Northern Union.

A small stand existed on the Wigginton Road side of the ground but this was deemed unsafe by the local council and was rebuilt in 1902. The new stand was opened by local MP, John G. Butcher on 20 September 1902. This stand was destroyed by fire in 1922 and Sr John Butcher opened its replacement in October 1922. Fire again struck the ground when the pavilion and press box were destroyed in August 1926.

In 1931 the club purchased the freehold of the stadium from Bootham Park hospital and also acquired some adjoining allotment land on the Haxby Road which became the club's training pitch.

The record attendance for the ground was set on 10 February 1934 when 14,631 saw a 0–0 draw between York and Swinton in the first round of the 1933–34 Challenge Cup.

In 1938, the ground hosted baseball and the home fixtures of York City Maroons in the Yorkshire League.

During the Second World War the training pitch was returned to use as allotments while the main pitch was made available to the local rugby union club's use.

By the 1980s the York club's finances were at a low point and in 1986 the training ground was sold for housing use, the money being used to stave off bankruptcy of the club. However, this was not enough and in January 1989 the council ordered the club to improve ground safety or risk closure. Unable to afford the safety work, the ground was sold off and the club moved out of town to the Huntington Stadium. The last game at Clarence Street was on 26 March 1989 when 2,904 spectators saw York beat Hunslet 26–17.

== Tour matches ==
The ground played host to a number of games between York and touring teams from New Zealand, Australia or a combined Australasia team and on two occasions between the representative sides and the Australian tourists. York also played an Italian national amateur team in 1954 during a tour by the Italians before an Italian governing body was recognised.

| Date | Result | Attendance | Notes | Ref. |
|---|---|---|---|---|
| 29 January 1908 | York def. New Zealand 5–3 | 4,500 | 1907–08 All Golds tour | |
| 14 October 1908 | York drew with Australia 5–5 | 1,781 | 1908–09 Kangaroo tour | |
| 13 December 1911 | Australasia def. York 16–8 | 1,500 | 1911–12 Kangaroo tour | |
| 2 November 1921 | York def Australasia 9–3 | 5,000 | 1921–22 Kangaroo tour | |
| 6 October 1926 | New Zealand def. York 19–11 | 3,099 | 1926–27 New Zealand Kiwis tour | |
| 11 September 1929 | Australia def. York 32–11 | 4,729 | 1929–30 Kangaroo tour | |
| 1 November 1933 | Northern Rugby League XIII def. Australia 16–9 | 3,158 | 1933–34 Kangaroo tour | |
| 23 December 1933 | Australia def. York 15–7 | 6,500 | 1933–34 Kangaroo tour | |
| 22 September 1937 | Australia def. York 15–6 | 5,000 | 1937–38 Kangaroo tour | |
| 10 April 1954 | York def. Italian XIII 54–17 | 4,000 | | |
| 14 September 1955 | York def. New Zealand 20–16 | 8,242 | 1955–56 New Zealand Kiwis tour | |
| 3 November 1956 | Australia def. York 20–18 | 6,846 | 1956–57 Kangaroo tour | |
| 28 September 1959 | Yorkshire def. Australia 47–15 | 7,338 | 1959–60 Kangaroo tour | |
| 31 October 1971 | York def. New Zealand 11–5 | 2,803 | 1971 New Zealand Kiwis tour | |
| 9 November 1975 | Australia def. York 45–4 | 4,082 | Australian 1975 Rugby League World Cup tour | |
| 14 November 1978 | Australia def. York 29–2 | 7,338 | 1978 Kangaroo tour | |
| 5 November 1983 | New Zealand Māori def. York League 16–6 | 2,300 | 1983 New Zealand Māori tour | |
