= Geoff Pryce =

English rugby league footballer (1961–2020)

Personal information
- Full name: Geoffrey Winston Pryce
- Born: 17 July 1961 Bradford, England
- Died: 5 December 2020 (aged 59) Bradford, England

Playing information
- Position: Wing
Club
Years	Team	Pld	T	G	FG	P
1980–92	York
Representative
Years	Team	Pld	T	G	FG	P
1982	Yorkshire	1	3	0	0	9
- Relatives: Leon Pryce (cousin); Karl Pryce (cousin); Waine Pryce (cousin); Will Pryce (2nd cousin)

Geoffrey Winston Pryce (17 July 1961 – 5 December 2020) was an English rugby league footballer, most associated with York. Originally a winger, he occasionally played centre, and later in his career he moved into the second row. He was also known to play as an emergency hooker.

== Biography ==
Geoff Pryce was born on 17 July 1961 in Bradford, West Riding of Yorkshire, England. He died on 5 December 2020 aged 59.

=== Career ===
He made his debut for York on 28 December 1980 against Swinton and was a member of the side that gained promotion 1981 and 1986 and the side that reached the semi-final of the 1984 Rugby League Challenge Cup. He made a total of 286 appearances for York between 1980 and 1992, scoring 101 tries and 374 points. He scored a hat trick on his Yorkshire debut on 26 May 1982 in a 22–21 win over Lancashire at Leigh. He is an inductee into the York Hall Of Fame.

=== Family ===
He was a member of a well known Bradford rugby league playing family, including Leon Pryce, Dennis Pryce, Karl Pryce and Waine Pryce.

=== Style of play ===
He was described as "Best known for his tremendous strength, he was a strong runner, often taking several tacklers to stop him. He played on the wing, in the pack and everywhere in between throughout his time at York. His style of play – along with his approachable nature and huge smile – made him a fans’ favourite."
