= Baskerville Shield =

Rugby league competition between England and New Zealand

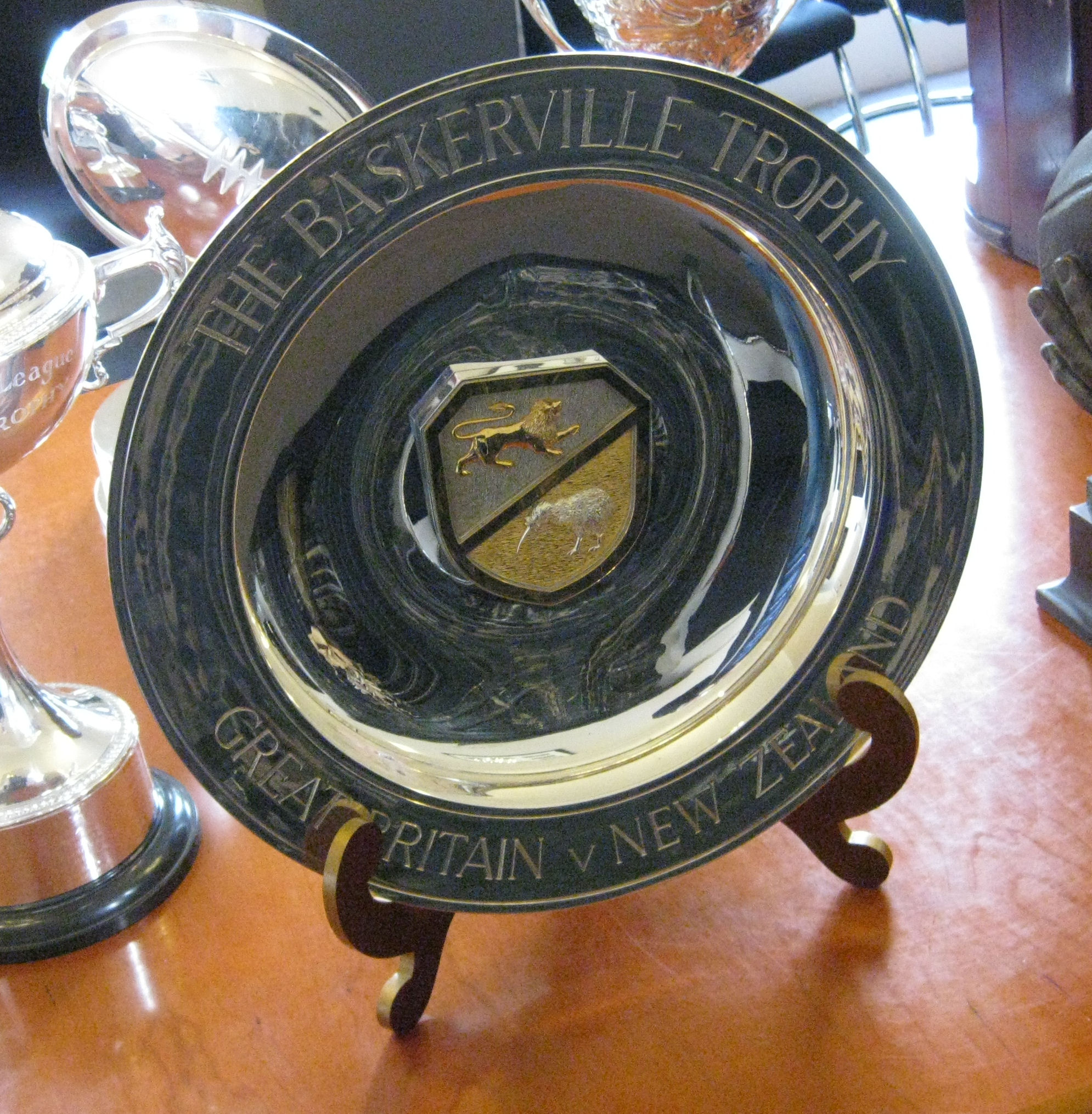

- England New Zealand
- Sport: Rugby league
- First meeting: 2002

Statistics
- Total meetings: 4
- All-time record: 4-0-0

The Baskerville Shield is a trophy awarded to the winner of rugby league test series between England and New Zealand. It named in honour of Albert Henry Baskerville, who organised the first ever tour by New Zealand of Great Britain in 1907.

The spelling of the trophy is somewhat controversial, as there is much evidence to suggest that Baskiville was the correct spelling of the surname. However, the Rugby Football League used the Baskerville spelling arguing that this was the version used by the man himself.

There is also a trophy with this name awarded to the winner of the National Competition in New Zealand.

== History ==
The shield was inaugurated for the 2002 Kiwi tour of Great Britain and France in which New Zealand played seven games in Europe, winning six of these, including three against British club sides and one against an England A team. The test series between New Zealand and Great Britain was drawn, with one win each and one draw. The New Zealand Rugby League agreed that Great Britain should keep the inaugural shield because it wasn't won outright.

In the 2007 Kiwi tour of Great Britain and France, Great Britain won the series 3-0 to retain the shield. The largest of these losses was a 0-44 result in front of 20,324 at the KC Stadium, Hull. The tour was conducted as part of the celebrations of 100 years of New Zealand rugby league and was played in honour of the original 1907 tour. New Zealand played four games in total with all of these in Europe. After the tour, the Great Britain team was retired in favour the individual home nations taking priority on the international stage and as a result lengthy tours stopped taking place.

In the 2015 Kiwi tour of England, the shield was contested between New Zealand and England. England won the shield 2–1. The tour was the first to Europe by an Australasian team since the previous tour by New Zealand in 2007. The tour was shorter than others with just four games taking place, three against England and one against Leeds Rhinos. New Zealand won the Leeds game and the second test by just 9–2 in front of 44,393 at Olympic Stadium, London.

England and New Zealand contested the Baskerville Shield again during the 2018 Kiwi tour of England. England won the shield 2–1, taking an unassailable lead with victories in the first two tests before New Zealand gained a consolation win in the final match.

== Results ==
Year	Host	Winner	Series score	Runner-up
2002	United Kingdom	Great Britain (Note: New Zealand Rugby League agreed Great Britain should win the competition as they were the touring side and did not win it outright.)	1.5 – 1.5	New Zealand
2007	United Kingdom	Great Britain	3 – 0	New Zealand
2015	England	England	2 – 1	New Zealand
2018	England	England	2 – 1	New Zealand

== George Smith Medal ==
Also inaugurated in 2002 was the George Smith Medal. Named after New Zealand sportsman George William Smith, it is awarded to the player of the series in matches between New Zealand and Great Britain, and latterly England.

- 2002: Stacey Jones
- 2007: Rob Burrow
- 2015: Sean O'Loughlin
- 2018: Tommy Makinson

== Player statistics ==
=== Try scorers ===
Tries	Name
3	Leon Pryce (GB), Keith Senior (GB), Henry Fa'afili (NZL)
2	Jamie Peacock (GB), Martin Gleeson (GB), Gareth Raynor (GB), Rob Burrow (GB), Nigel Vagana (NZL), Stacey Jones (NZL), Shontayne Hape (NZL), Paul Whatuira (NZL), Chase Stanley (NZL), Brett Ferres (ENG), Sean O'Loughlin (ENG), Elliot Whitehead (ENG)
1	Paul Sculthorpe (GB), Sam Burgess (GB), Maurie Fa'asavalu (GB), Ade Gardner (GB), Paul Wellens (GB), David Hodgson (GB), Danny Maguire (GB), Jon Wilkin (GB), Stephen Kearney (NZL), Francis Meli (NZL), Ruben Wiki (NZL), Ali Lauiti'iti (NZL), Taniela Tuiaki (NZL), Tohu Harris (NZL), Sam Moa (NZL), Shaun Kenny-Dowall (NZL), Josh Hodgson (ENG)

=== Goal scorers ===
Goals	Name
10	Gareth Widdop (ENG)
9	Andy Farrell (GB), Rob Burrow (GB)
5	Kevin Sinfield (GB)
4	Richard Swain (NZL)
3	Jeremy Smith (NZL), Isaac Luke (NZL)
1	Stacey Jones (NZL), Lance Hohaia (NZL)

== Attendances ==
=== Average attendances ===
The 2015 series saw an average of 11,527 more people attend the three tests, this major increase owing largely to the test played at Olympic Stadium, London when 44,393 people were in attendance.

Seven different stadiums have been used over the twelve tests that have taken place. DW Stadium, Wigan has been used the most times with three tests held there.

Year	Host	Total attendance	Matches	Average attendance	% of change	Stadium Capacity	% Capacity
2002	United Kingdom	62,505	3	20,835	N/A	80,633	77.51%
2007	United Kingdom	58,081	3	19,360	▼7.08%	75,033	77.35%
2015	England	92,660	3	30,887	▲59.54%	116,538	79.51%
2018	England	76,069	3	25,356	▼17.91%	117,364	64.81%

=== Highest attendances ===
The highest attendance in the history of the Baskerville Shield test series is 44,393 which was seen at the Olympic Stadium, London, the only game to be played outside of the traditional rugby league heartland of the north of England.

Rank	Stadium	Attendance	Event
1	Olympic Stadium, London	44,393	2015: Test 2
2	Elland Road, Leeds	32,186	2018: Test 3
3	Anfield, Liverpool	26,234	2018: Test 2
4	DW Stadium, Wigan	24,741	2015: Test 3
5	Kirklees Stadium, Huddersfield	23,604	2002: Test 2
