= 2007 All Golds Tour =

New Zealand national rugby league team's centenary tour

2007 All Golds tour
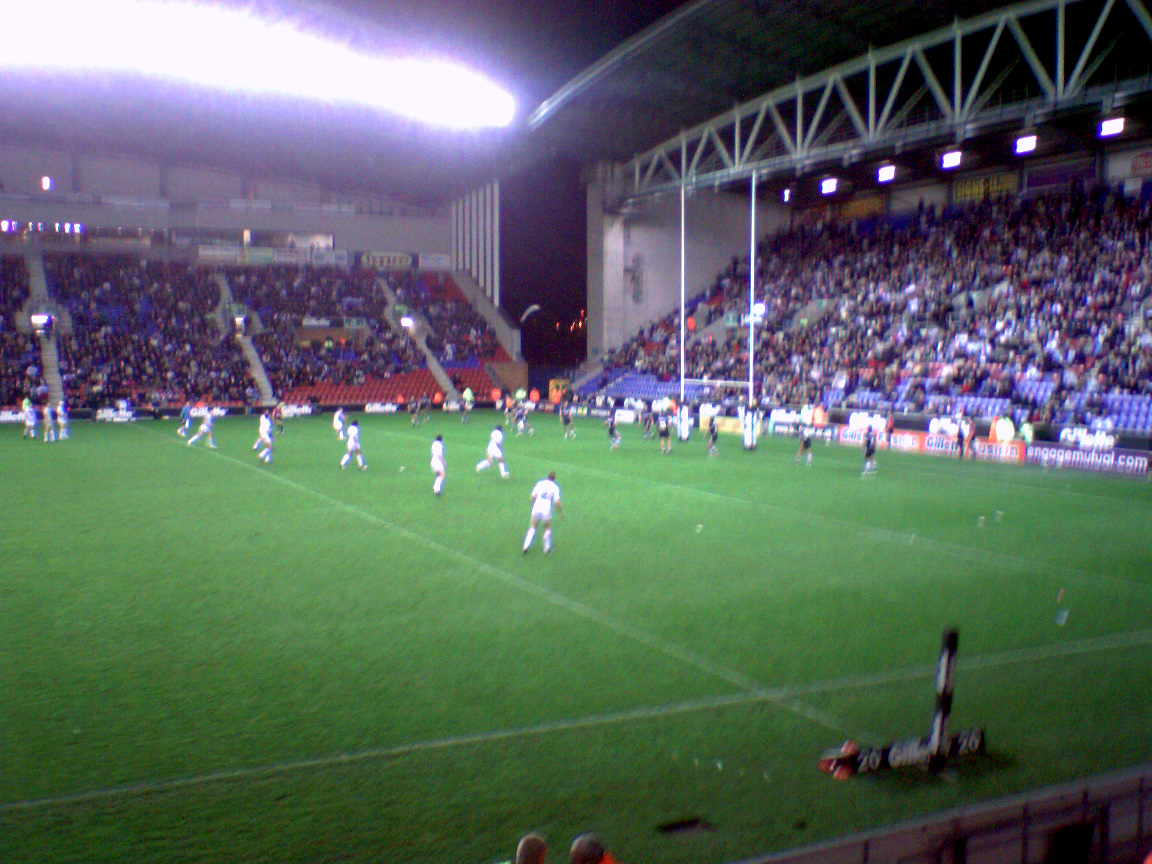
- The third test against Great Britain, 10 November 2007
- Date: 13 October 2007 – 17 November 2007
Summary
P	W	D	L
Total
5	1	0	4
Test match
5	1	0	4
Opponent
P	W	D	L
Australia
1	0	0	1
Great Britain
3	0	0	3
France
1	1	0	0

Tour chronology
- Previous tour: 2002
- Next tour: 2015

The 2007 All Golds Tour was a tour by the New Zealand national rugby league team, the Kiwis, of Great Britain and France. The Kiwis played five test matches, winning one against France, but losing the game against Australia and the series against Great Britain 3–0, failing to win the Baskerville Shield.

The 2007 All Golds tour marked the centenary of the inaugural rugby league tour – the 1907-1908 New Zealand rugby tour of Great Britain. New Zealand, then nicknamed "The All Golds" reverted to this name for the tour in celebration of the anniversary. A special game for retired players, labeled the "All Golds vs Northern Union game" was also played.

The tour involved a reception with Elizabeth II at Buckingham Palace for the squad.

== Squad ==
Name	Australia	GB	GB	GB	France	Games	Tries	Goals	FGs	Points	Club
Louis Anderson		BE	BE	SR	SR	4*	1	0	0	4	New Zealand Warriors
Roy Asotasi (C)	PR	PR	PR	PR	PR	5	0	0	0	0	South Sydney Rabbitohs
Luke Covell	WG					1	0	0	0	0	Cronulla Sharks
Greg Eastwood		BE		BE		2*	0	0	0	0	Brisbane Broncos
David Faiumu	BE			BE	BE	3	0	0	0	0	North Queensland Cowboys
Dene Halatau	HK	HK	HK	HK	HK	5	0	0	0	0	Wests Tigers
Shontayne Hape	BE	CE	WG			3	2	0	0	8	Bradford Bulls
Lance Hohaia		FE	FE	BE		3	0	1	0	2	New Zealand Warriors
Krisnan Inu	FB					1	0	0	0	0	Parramatta Eels
Shaun Kenny-Dowall					WG	1*	1	0	0	4	Sydney Roosters
Epalahame Lauaki		BE		BE		2*	0	0	0	0	New Zealand Warriors
Thomas Leuluai		HB	HB		BE	3*	1	0	0	4	Wigan Warriors
Jeff Lima	BE			BE	BE	3	0	0	0	0	Melbourne Storm
Simon Mannering	SR	SR	SR	LK	LK	5	0	0	0	0	New Zealand Warriors
Steve Matai	CE					1	0	0	0	0	Manly Warringah Sea Eagles
Fuifui Moimoi	PR	PR	BE	BE	BE	5	0	0	0	0	Parramatta Eels
Sam Perrett		FB	FB	FB	FB	4*	0	0	0	0	Sydney Roosters
Frank Pritchard	SR	SR	SR			3	0	0	0	0	Penrith Panthers
Sam Rapira	BE	BE	PR	PR	PR	5	0	0	0	0	New Zealand Warriors
Ben Roberts	FE			FE	FE	3	0	3	0	6	Bulldogs
Jeremy James Smith	HB			HB	HB	3	0	0	0	0	South Sydney Rabbitohs
Jeremy Jon Oscar Smith	LK	LK	LK	SR	SR	5	0	3	0	6	Melbourne Storm
Chase Stanley				WG	WG	2*	2	0	0	8	St George Illawarra Dragons
Clinton Toopi			CE	CE	CE	3*	0	0	0	0	Leeds Rhinos
Taniela Tuiaki	WG	WG	WG	WG		4	1	0	0	4	Wests Tigers
Tame Tupou		WG				1*	0	0	0	0	Bradford Bulls
Paul Whatuira	CE	CE	CE	CE	CE	5	3	0	0	12	Wests Tigers

- Coach: Gary Kemble

*Also played in All Golds match.

=== Australian representative ===
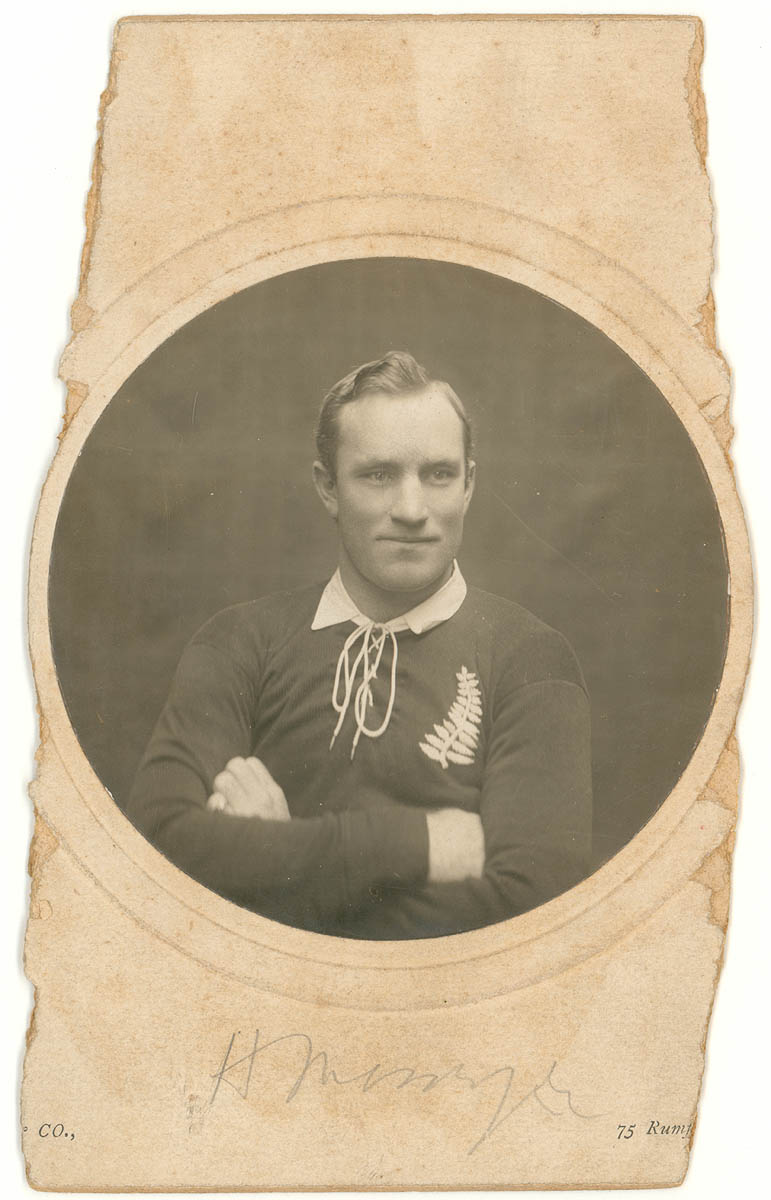
Dally Messenger, 1907 The one Australian All Black

To celebrate the inclusion of Australia's Dally Messenger in the original All Golds tour, New Zealand Warriors captain and Queensland front rower Steve Price was invited to join the New Zealand team for the match against the Northern Union. The Australian test prop said it was "mind-blowing" to be invited on the tour.

Andrew Johns had initially been invited, but due to a career-ending neck injury, he was unable to play with the squad. Australian captain Darren Lockyer was then set to take Johns' place until he too was ruled out after suffering a season-ending knee injury. Trent Barrett was also linked with the stand-off role in the side.

=== All Blacks and former Kiwi Test players ===
The NZRL expressed interest in including recently retired New Zealand rugby league stars Nigel Vagana, Ruben Wiki, and Stacey Jones in test matches. All three came out of international retirement to play in the match against the Northern Union.

Several current and former All Blacks (New Zealand rugby union players) were also considered for the match against the Northern Union. Players who grew up playing rugby league such as Carlos Spencer, Piri Weepu and Ma'a Nonu were approached by the NZRL however none were available due to rugby union commitments. Jonah Lomu was also considered but was effectively ruled out due to media and personal appearance commitments at the 2007 Rugby World Cup.

=== Coach ===
Brisbane Broncos' Australian coach Wayne Bennett accepted the invitation from the New Zealand Rugby League to join the All Golds for their commemorative match against the Northern Union in England in October. The former Queensland and Australia coach stated "This is a great honour and it's unique in the game."

== Fixtures ==
The New Zealand side played a total of five matches while on their European tour and one test in New Zealand before leaving.

Date	Opponent	Venue	City	Res.	Score	Attend.	Rep.
13 October	Australia	Westpac	Wellington	Lost	0–58	16,681	
21 October	Northern Union	Halliwell Jones	Warrington	Won	25–18	6,800	
27 October	Great Britain	Galpharm	Huddersfield	Lost	14–20	16,522	
3 November	Great Britain	Kingston	Kingston upon Hull	Lost	0–44	20,324	
10 November	Great Britain	JJB Stadium	Wigan	Lost	22–28	21,235	
17 November	France	Jean-Bouin	Paris	Won	22–14	6,781	

Italics indicates the Northern Union vs All Golds game which was contested by retired players

== New Zealand vs Australia ==
There was a pre-tour test between Australia and New Zealand in Wellington.

13 October 2007

New Zealand	0 – 58	Australia
Tries: Goals:		Tries: Greg Inglis (3); Israel Folau (2); Greg Bird; Jarryd Hayne; Willie Mason; Steve Price; Cameron Smith; Brett Stewart; Goals: Cameron Smith (6/10); Kurt Gidley (1/1)

Westpac Stadium, Wellington
Attendance: 16,681
Referee: Steve Ganson (United Kingdom)
Player of the Match: Greg Inglis

Team details

New Zealand	Australia

FB	1	Krisnan Inu
LW	2	Luke Covell
RC	3	Steve Matai
LC	4	Paul Whatuira
RW	5	Taniela Tuiaki
FE	6	Ben Roberts
HB	7	Jeremy James Smith
PR	8	Roy Asotasi (c)
HK	9	Dene Halatau
PR	10	Fuifui Moimoi
SR	11	Simon Mannering
SR	12	Frank Pritchard
LK	13	Jeremy Jon Oscar Smith
Substitutions:
IC	14	David Faiumu
IC	15	Shontayne Hape
IC	16	Sam Rapira
IC	17	Jeff Lima
Coach:
(New Zealand) Gary Kemble

FB	1	Brett Stewart
LW	2	Israel Folau
RC	3	Mark Gasnier
LC	4	Greg Inglis
RW	5	Jarryd Hayne
FE	6	Greg Bird
HB	7	Cooper Cronk
PR	8	Steve Price
HK	9	Cameron Smith (c)
PR	10	Petero Civoniceva
SR	11	Nathan Hindmarsh
SR	12	Ryan Hoffman
LF	13	Dallas Johnson
Substitutions:
IC	14	Brent Kite
IC	15	Kurt Gidley
IC	16	Willie Mason
IC	17	Michael Crocker
Coach:
(Australia) Ricky Stuart

== All Golds v Northern Union ==
This was an exhibition match played under 1907 scoring rules with tries worth 3 points and goals / field goals worth 2 points each.

21 October 2007

Northern Union	18 – 25	All Golds
Tries: Danny McGuire (2); Jon Clarke; Kirk Yeaman Goals: Jamie Rooney (3/4)		Tries: Ali Lauitiiti (2); Greg Eastwood; Louis Anderson; Clinton Toopi; Goals: Stacey Jones (5/5)

Halliwell Jones Stadium, Warrington
Attendance: 6,800
Referee: Ashley Klein (Australia)
Player of the Match: Sam Burgess

Team details

Northern Union	All Golds

FB	1	Michael Platt
LW	2	David Hodgson
RC	3	Martin Gleeson
LC	4	Kirk Yeaman
RW	5	Gareth Raynor
SO	6	Danny McGuire
SH	7	Jamie Rooney
PR	8	Adrian Morley (c)
HK	9	Terry Newton
PR	10	Andy Lynch
SR	11	Danny Tickle
SR	12	Stephen Wild
LK	13	Sam Burgess
Substitutions:
IC	14	Jon Clarke
IC	15	Richard Moore
IC	16	Paul Sykes
IC	17	Andy Coley
Coach:
(Australia) Tony Smith

FB	1	Sam Perrett
LW	2	Shaun Kenny-Dowall
RC	3	Nigel Vagana
LC	4	Clinton Toopi
RW	5	Tame Tupou
FE	6	Thomas Leuluai
HB	7	Stacey Jones
PR	8	Steve Price
HK	9	David Faiumu
PR	10	Ruben Wiki (c)
SR	11	Ali Lauitiiti
SR	12	David Kidwell
LK	13	Louis Anderson
Substitutions:
IC	14	Greg Eastwood
IC	15	Epalahame Lauaki
IC	16	Awen Guttenbeil
IC	17	Chase Stanley
Coach:
(Australia) Wayne Bennett

Steve Price was the Australian guest player emulating Dally Messenger's role with the original All Golds. 19 year old Bradford forward Sam Burgess was awarded the Man of the Match and his performance saw his inclusion in the Great Britain squad for the upcoming Baskerville Shield series against the Kiwis.

Stacey Jones in his last international match kicked 5 goals from 5 attempts.

== Baskerville Shield ==
=== Venues ===
The three Baskerville Shield tests took place at the following venues.

Huddersfield	Kingston upon Hull	Wigan
Kirklees Stadium	KC Stadium	JJB Stadium
Capacity: 24,500	Capacity: 25,400	Capacity: 25,133

=== 1st Test ===
27 October 2007

Great Britain	20 – 14	New Zealand
Tries: Sam Burgess; Maurie Fa'asavalu; Gareth Raynor; Goals: Rob Burrow (4/4)		Tries: Shontayne Hape (2); Paul Whatuira Goals: Lance Hohaia (1/3)

Galpharm Stadium, Huddersfield
Attendance: 16,522
Referee: Tony Archer (Australia)
Player of the Match: Rob Burrow

Team details

Great Britain	New Zealand

FB	1	Paul Wellens
LW	2	Ade Gardner
RC	3	Martin Gleeson
LC	4	Keith Senior
RW	5	Gareth Raynor
SO	6	Leon Pryce
SH	7	Rob Burrow
PR	8	Adrian Morley
HK	9	Jon Clarke
PR	10	Jamie Peacock (c)
SR	11	Gareth Ellis
SR	12	Sean O'Loughlin
LK	13	Kevin Sinfield
Substitutions:
IC	14	Maurie Fa'asavalu
IC	15	James Graham
IC	16	Sam Burgess
IC	17	Danny McGuire
Coach:
(Australia) Tony Smith

FB	1	Sam Perrett
LW	2	Tame Tupou
RC	3	Clinton Toopi
LC	4	Paul Whatuira
RW	5	Taniela Tuiaki
FE	6	Lance Hohaia
HB	7	Thomas Leuluai
PR	8	Roy Asotasi (c)
HK	9	Dene Halatau
PR	10	Fuifui Moimoi
SR	11	Simon Mannering
SR	12	Frank Pritchard
LK	13	Jeremy Jon Oscar Smith
Substitutions:
IC	14	Greg Eastwood
IC	15	Louis Anderson
IC	16	Sam Rapira
IC	17	Epalahame Lauaki
Coach:
(New Zealand) Gary Kemble

=== 2nd Test ===
3 November 2007

Great Britain	44 – 0	New Zealand
Tries: Leon Pryce; Rob Burrow; Ade Gardner; Jamie Peacock; Gareth Raynor; Keith Senior; Paul Wellens; Goals: Kevin Sinfield (5/5); Rob Burrow (1/3)		Tries: Goals:

KC Stadium, Kingston upon Hull
Attendance: 20,324
Referee: Tony Archer (Australia)

Team details

Great Britain	New Zealand

FB	1	Paul Wellens
LW	2	Ade Gardner
RC	3	Martin Gleeson
LC	4	Keith Senior
RW	5	Gareth Raynor
SO	6	Leon Pryce
SH	7	Rob Burrow
PR	8	Adrian Morley
HK	9	Jon Clarke
PR	10	Jamie Peacock (c)
SR	11	Gareth Ellis
SR	12	Sean O'Loughlin
LK	13	Kevin Sinfield
Substitutions:
IC	14	Maurie Fa'asavalu
IC	15	James Graham
IC	16	Sam Burgess
IC	17	Danny McGuire
Coach:
(Australia) Tony Smith

FB	1	Sam Perrett
LW	2	Taniela Tuiaki
RC	3	Clinton Toopi
LC	4	Paul Whatuira
RW	5	Tame Tupou
FE	6	Lance Hohaia
HB	7	Thomas Leuluai
PR	8	Sam Rapira
HK	9	Dene Halatau
PR	10	Roy Asotasi (c)
SR	11	Simon Mannering
SR	12	Frank Pritchard
LK	13	Jeremy Jon Oscar Smith
Substitutions:
IC	14	Fuifui Moimoi
IC	15	David Faiumu
IC	16	Louis Anderson
IC	17	Greg Eastwood
Coach:
(New Zealand) Gary Kemble

=== 3rd Test ===
10 November 2007

Great Britain	28 – 22	New Zealand
Tries: Rob Burrow; David Hodgson; Danny McGuire; Keith Senior; Jon Wilkin; Goals: Rob Burrow (4/6)		Tries: Chase Stanley (2); Taniela Tuiaki; Paul Whatuira Goals: Jeremy Jon Oscar Smith (3/4)

JJB Stadium, Wigan
Attendance: 21,235
Referee: Tony Archer (Australia)

Team details

Great Britain	New Zealand

FB	1	Paul Wellens
LW	2	Ade Gardner
RC	3	Martin Gleeson
LC	4	Keith Senior
RW	5	David Hodgson
SO	6	Danny McGuire
SH	7	Rob Burrow
PR	8	Adrian Morley
HK	9	Jon Clarke
PR	10	Jamie Peacock (c)
SR	11	Gareth Ellis
SR	12	Sean O'Loughlin
LK	13	Jon Wilkin
Substitutions:
IC	14	James Graham
IC	15	Jamie Jones-Buchanan
IC	16	James Roby
IC	17	Kirk Yeaman
Coach:
(Australia) Tony Smith

FB	1	Sam Perrett
LW	2	Chase Stanley
RC	3	Clinton Toopi
LC	4	Paul Whatuira
RW	5	Taniela Tuiaki
FE	6	Lance Hohaia
HB	7	Jeremy James Smith
PR	8	Sam Rapira
HK	9	Dene Halatau
PR	10	Roy Asotasi (c)
SR	11	Louis Anderson
SR	12	Jeremy Jon Oscar Smith
LK	13	Simon Mannering
Substitutions:
IC	14	Lance Hohaia
IC	15	Fuifui Moimoi
IC	16	Epalahame Lauaki
IC	17	Jeff Lima
Coach:
(New Zealand) Gary Kemble

== France vs New Zealand ==
17 November 2007

France	14 – 22	New Zealand
Tries: Éric Anselme; Cyril Stacul Goals: Maxime Grésèque (3/3)		Tries: Louis Anderson; Shaun Kenny-Dowall; Thomas Leuluai; Paul Whatuira; Goals: Ben Roberts (3/4)

Stade Jean-Bouin, Paris
Attendance: 6,781
Referee: Ashley Klein (Australia)

Team details

France	New Zealand

FB	1	Thomas Bosc
LW	2	Justin Murphy
RC	3	Sébastien Planas
LC	4	Sébastien Raguin
RW	5	Cyril Stacul
SO	6	Christophe Moly
SH	7	Maxime Grésèque
PR	8	David Ferriol
HK	9	Julien Rinaldi (c)
PR	10	Adel Fellous
SR	11	Cyrille Gossard
SR	12	Éric Anselme
LK	13	Laurent Carrasco
Substitutions:
IC	14	Jean-Christophe Borlin
IC	15	Rémi Casty
IC	16	Teddy Sadaoui
IC	17	James Wynne
Coach:
(Australia) John Monie

FB	1	Sam Perrett
LW	2	Chase Stanley
RC	3	Clinton Toopi
LC	4	Paul Whatuira
RW	5	Shaun Kenny-Dowall
FE	6	Ben Roberts
HB	7	Jeremy James Smith
PR	8	Sam Rapira
HK	9	Dene Halatau
PR	10	Roy Asotasi (c)
SR	11	Louis Anderson
SR	12	Jeremy Jon Oscar Smith
LK	13	Simon Mannering
Substitutions:
IC	14	Thomas Leuluai
IC	15	Jeff Lima
IC	16	David Faiumu
IC	17	Fuifui Moimoi
Coach:
(New Zealand) Gary Kemble

== Aftermath ==
Great Britain's scrum half back, Rob Burrow was awarded the George Smith Medal as player of the series which he finished as top points scorer with 26 from two tries and nine goals. Coach Gary Kemble was fired after the tour losses, with Roy Asotasi and David Kidwell leading a public campaign to replace him. Kemble was replaced by Stephen Kearney as head coach and Wayne Bennett assistant coach, a combination which took the Kiwis to win the 2008 World Cup. The All Golds played another match, against the New Zealand Māori in New Plymouth, in 2008 as part of the lead up to the Rugby League World Cup.

== See also ==
- New Zealand Rugby League
- Rugby league in New Zealand
