= All Golds Tour =

All Golds Tour may refer to:

- 1907–08 New Zealand rugby tour of Australia and Great Britain, the original New Zealand national rugby league team or "All Golds" tour
- 2007 All Golds Tour, the New Zealand national rugby league team's centenary tour
