= Frank Pritchard =

Australian rugby league footballer & coach

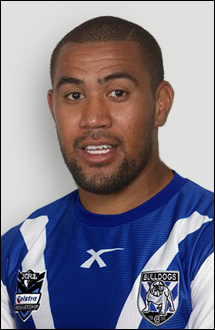

Personal information
- Full name: Frank Semu Pritchard
- Born: 3 November 1983 (age 43) Sydney, New South Wales, Australia
- Height: 187 cm (6 ft 2 in)
- Weight: 112–120 kg (17 st 9 lb – 18 st 13 lb)

Playing information
- Position: Second-row, Prop
Club
| Years | Team | Pld | T | G | FG | P |
|---|---|---|---|---|---|---|
| 2003–10 | Penrith Panthers | 144 | 37 | 0 | 0 | 148 |
| 2011–15 | Canterbury Bulldogs | 104 | 20 | 0 | 0 | 80 |
| 2016 | Hull F.C. | 26 | 5 | 0 | 0 | 20 |
| 2017 | Parramatta Eels | 8 | 0 | 0 | 0 | 0 |
| | Total | 282 | 62 | 0 | 0 | 248 |
Representative
| Years | Team | Pld | T | G | FG | P |
| 2005–13 | New Zealand | 27 | 6 | 0 | 0 | 24 |
| 2012 | NRL All Stars | 1 | 0 | 0 | 0 | 0 |
| 2014–17 | Samoa | 8 | 1 | 0 | 0 | 4 |

Coaching information
Representative
| Years | Team | Gms | W | D | L | W% |
| 2026– | Samoa Women | 4 | 2 | 0 | 2 | 50 |
- Source: As of 21 November 2026
- Relatives: Kaysa Pritchard (brother)

Frank Semu Pritchard (born 3 November 1983), also known by the nicknames "Cranky" and "Frank the Tank", is a former professional rugby league footballer who represented New Zealand and Samoa at international level. A second-row, he played in the National Rugby League for Sydney clubs the Penrith Panthers, Canterbury-Bankstown Bulldogs and the Parramatta Eels during the 2000s and 2010s. Pritchard also played in the Super League for English club Hull FC.

== Background ==
Of Samoan and Pākehā (Anglo-Saxon) New Zealander descent, Pritchard was born in Sydney on 3 November 1983. He played his junior rugby league for the St Clair Comets and Campbelltown City Kangaroos, and attended Eagle Vale High School before being signed by the Penrith Panthers. Pritchard's younger brother, Kaysa Pritchard, would also go on to play in the NRL.

== Playing career ==
=== 2000s ===
In Round 8 of the 2003 NRL season, Pritchard made his NRL début for Penrith Panthers against the Manly-Warringah Sea Eagles off the interchange bench in the Panthers 30–29 win at Penrith Stadium. Pritchard was named 18th man for the Panthers 2003 NRL Grand Final squad playing the Sydney Roosters. He finished his début year with 7 games.

In Round 15 in the 2004 NRL season against the Cronulla-Sutherland Sharks, Pritchard scored his first career try in the Panthers 32–12 win at Remondis Stadium. Pritchard finished the season with 2 tries in 12 matches.

Pritchard played the first 5 games of the 2005 season off the interchange bench before regular starting second rower Tony Puletua was side-lined with a season-ending pectoral muscle injury. Pritchard played in the 2005 ANZAC Test, making his international test début for New Zealand against Australia at second-row in the Kiwis 16–32 loss at Suncorp Stadium. Pritchard played 22 matches and scored one try for the Panthers. He was selected to represent New Zealand in the end of year Tri-Nations series, playing in 3 matches.

Pritchard was selected for New Zealand in the 2006 ANZAC Test, coming off the interchange bench in the Kiwis' 12–50 loss at Suncorp Stadium. Pritchard finished the 2006 NRL season 20 matches and scoring 3 tries for the Panthers. Pritchard was selected to represent New Zealand in the 2006 Tri-Nations series, playing in 4 matches, including scoring a try in the Kiwis 12-16 golden point final loss against Australia at the SFS.

On 17 February 2007, just before the NRL season, Pritchard and his brother Tom were involved in a violent confrontation in the Liverpool area. His brother reportedly received four knife wounds, including one to the pulmonary artery. Pritchard was stabbed in the hand, which led to him having an operation the next day. Pritchard was selected to for New Zealand in the 2007 ANZAC Test, coming off the interchange bench in the Kiwis 6–30 loss at Suncorp Stadium. In Round 23 against the Newcastle Knights, Pritchard scored a hat trick of tries in the Panthers 46–12 win at Hunter Stadium. Pritchard finished the Panthers 2007 NRL season with 23 matches and scoring 14 tries. Pritchard was selected to represent New Zealand in the 2007 All Golds Tour series, playing in 3 matches.

Pritchard was selected to for New Zealand in the century Trans-Tasman test match at the SCG, playing off the interchange bench in the Kiwis 12–28 loss. Pritchard finished the 2008 NRL season with 20 matches and scoring 6 tries for the Panthers. Pritchard was named in the New Zealand squad for the 2008 Rugby League World Cup but didn't play a match in the tournament due to shoulder problems.

Pritchard finished the 2009 NRL season with 20 matches and scoring 6 tries for the Panthers. Pritchard was selected to represent New Zealand in the 2009 Four Nations series, playing in 3 matches.

=== 2010s ===
On 25 August 2010, Pritchard agreed to three-year deal to sign with the Canterbury-Bankstown Bulldogs from 2011 onwards. In Round 26 against the Cronulla-Sutherland Sharks, Pritchard scored a hat trick in Penrith's 50–12 win at Penrith Stadium. Pritchard played in 20 matches and scored 5 tries in his final season with the Penrith Panthers. Pritchard was selected to represent New Zealand in the 2010 Four Nations series, playing in three matches.

In Round 1 of the 2011 NRL season, Pritchard made his club début for the Canterbury-Bankstown Bulldogs against the Wests Tigers off the interchange bench, scoring a try in Canterbury's 24–14 win at ANZ Stadium. Pritchard finished his first year with the club playing in all of Canterbury's 24 matches and scoring four tries.

On 6 February 2012, Pritchard was chosen to play for the NRL All Stars off the interchange bench in the 28–12 win over the Indigenous All Stars at Robina Stadium. Pritchard was selected to for New Zealand in the 2012 ANZAC Test at second-row in the Kiwis 12–20 loss at Eden Park. On 30 September 2012, In Canterbury's 2012 NRL Grand Final against the Melbourne Storm, Pritchard started at second-row in the club's 4–14 loss. Pritchard finished the 2012 NRL season with 26 matches and scoring four tries for the Canterbury club.

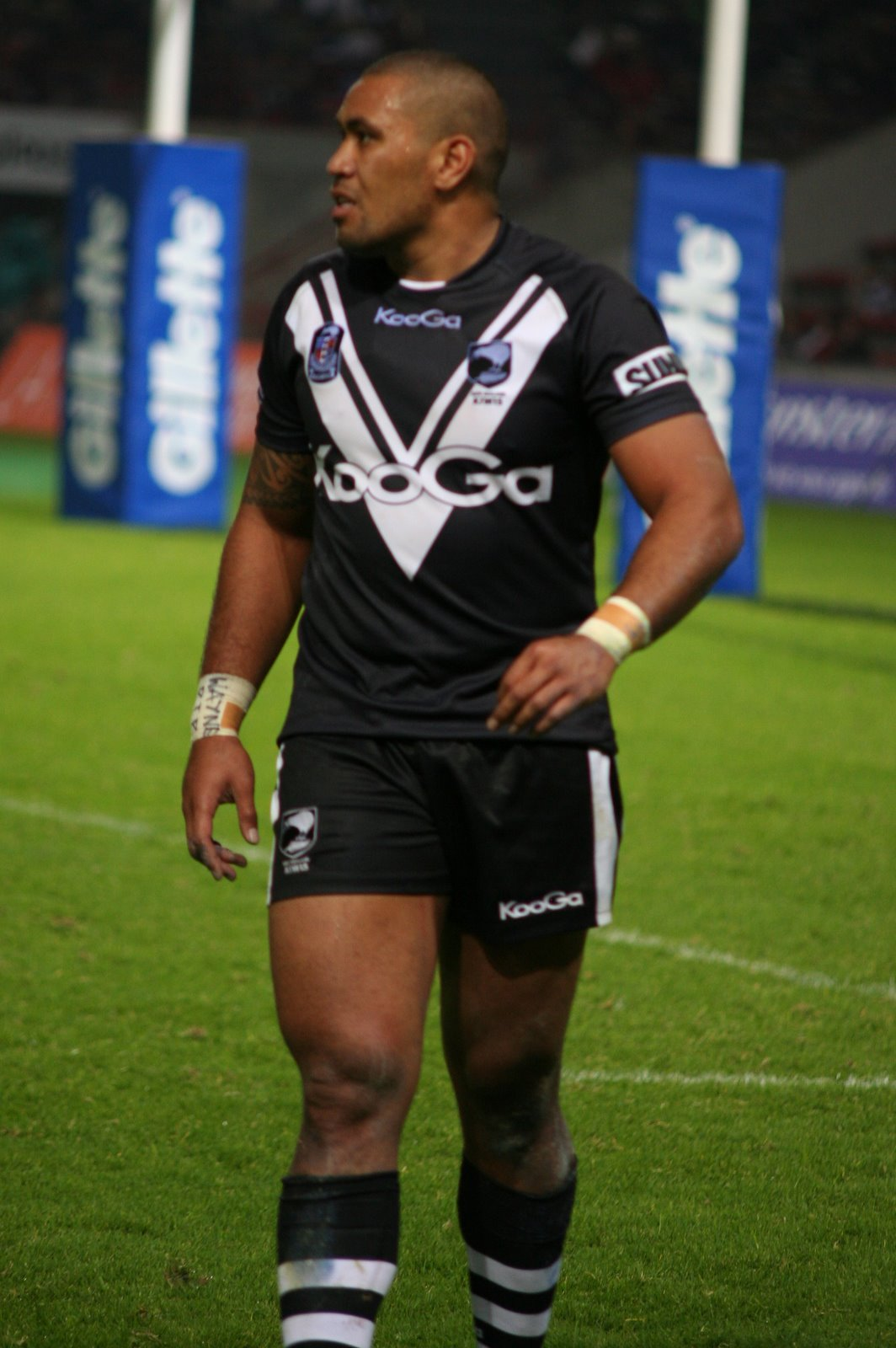
Pritchard playing for the Kiwis in 2013

Pritchard was selected to for New Zealand in the October 2012 test against Australia at second-row in the Kiwis 10–18 loss at 1300SMILES Stadium.

For the 2013 Anzac Test, Pritchard was selected to play for New Zealand at second-row, scoring a try in the 12–32 loss. Pritchard finished the Bulldogs 2013 NRL season playing 19 matches and scoring three tries. Pritchard was selected in New Zealand's 2013 World Cup squad, playing in three matches.

On 23 January 2014, Pritchard was appointed as a co-captain of Canterbury's team for the 2014 NRL season, alongside Michael Ennis. In Round 6, against the New Zealand Warriors at Eden Park, Pritchard suffered a pectoral muscle tear injury. This sidelined Pritchard until Round 26 where he played off the interchange bench in Canterbury's golden point extra time 18–19 loss to the Gold Coast Titans at Robina Stadium. On 5 October 2014, in Canterbury's 2014 NRL Grand Final against the South Sydney Rabbitohs, Pritchard played off the interchange bench in the club's 6–30 loss. Pritchard finished the 2014 NRL season with 10 matches and scoring a try for the Canterbury side. On 7 October 2014, Pritchard was selected in the Samoan 24-man squad for the 2014 Four Nations series. Pritchard played in all 3 matches for Samoa, making his début against England in Samoa's 26–32 loss at Suncorp Stadium.

On 23 January 2015, Pritchard was named in the Canterbury 2015 Auckland Nines squad. On 2 May 2015, Pritchard captained Samoa in their Polynesian Cup battle with Tonga. Pritchard played at second-row, scored a try and was involved in a try saving tackle with Samoa and Canterbury teammate Sam Kasiano on Tonga winger Jorge Taufua, forcing him over the sideline and securing Samoa the narrow 18–16 victory at Cbus Super Stadium. In Round 24 against South Sydney Rabbitohs, Pritchard played his 100th club match for the Canterbury-Bankstown club in the 32–18 win at ANZ Stadium. In the Bulldogs Semi-final match against the Sydney Roosters, Pritchard played his last club match for the Canterbury club in the 38–12 season ending loss at the SFS. Pritchard finished his last year in the NRL with 25 matches and scoring eight tries for the Canterbury-Bankstown Bulldogs in the 2015 NRL season.

Pritchard joined Hull F.C. for the 2016 Super League season, replacing Mose Masoe as the heaviest player in the competition. On 7 May 2016, Pritchard travelled down from Hull to Sydney to captain Samoa in the 2016 Polynesian Cup against Tonga, where he started in the second row in the 18–6 win at Parramatta Stadium.

On 27 August 2016, Pritchard would go on to make history as he played in the Challenge Cup Final for Hull F.C. against the Warrington Wolves. Hull, having never won at Wembley Stadium in 7 attempts had to come back from 10-0 down with 20 minutes to go to win the game 12–10, giving him his first major Trophy and going down in the history books as the first Hull team to win at Wembley.

Pritchard returned to Australia to play for the Parramatta Eels in the 2017 NRL season. At the end of the season was selected to captain the Samoa national rugby league team for their 2017 World Cup campaign. On 5 January 2018, Pritchard announced his retirement from rugby league.

== Present ==
Frank has pursued several coaching roles, notably serving as Assistant Coach for the Samoa national rugby league team. Additionally, he has taken on head coaching positions with the St. George Dragons Harold Matts team and the A Grade rugby league team at Patrician Brothers' College, Fairfield. Under Frank's leadership, the Fairfield Pats team clinched the 2022 NRL Schoolboy Cup defeating Hills Sport 20–16 and ending a 30-year championship drought.

On 13 February 2026 he took over the head-coach role for the Samoa Women
