= 2002 New Zealand rugby league tour =

2002 Kiwi tour
- Date: 12 October 2002 – 30 November 2002
Summary
P	W	D	L
Total
9	5	1	2
Test match
5	2	1	2
Opponent
P	W	D	L
Australia
1	0	0	1
England A
1	1	0	0
Wales
1	1	0	0
Great Britain
3	1	1	1
France
1	1	0	0

Tour chronology
- Previous tour: 1998
- Next tour: 2007

The 2002 New Zealand rugby league tour of Great Britain and France was a tour by the New Zealand national rugby league team. The New Zealand national rugby league team drew the series 1.5-1.5 against Great Britain and also defeated Wales and France.

== Background ==
This was the Kiwis first tour of Great Britain since the 2000 World Cup, the Kangaroos having toured Great Britain the previous year.

The original squad named in September included Nathan Cayless, Craig Smith and Tevita Vaikona who all later had to withdraw from the final squad.

Before the tour started the Prime Minister of New Zealand, Helen Clark, held an official reception for the team at the Beehive. It was the first New Zealand rugby league tour to receive an official farewell from a Prime Minister in Parliament.

The tour was opened against Hull F.C. at The Boulevard, the same ground had hosted the first Test matched played by the 1907 New Zealand team. This match was the last international played at the ground, while the 1907 team had played in the first.

Motu Tony broke his hand in the match against England A and was ruled out of the rest of the tour. Steve Clark refereed all three Test matches against Great Britain.

Former Kiwis player Sean Hoppe, who had not represented his country since 1999, was given the honour of captaining St Helens R.F.C. in a tour match against the Kiwis. The match was meant to be his last before retirement however he was later called into the touring squad due to injuries and his final two matches were test matches against Great Britain and France. Hoppe was called up over Lesley Vainikolo who was also considered as a replacement after injuries to several backs including Motu Tony and Clinton Toopi.

In the end Great Britain tied the series, taking the inaugural Baskerville Shield as hosts. The third test match was Great Britain's first win over New Zealand since 1993.

== Squad ==
Kiwis captain Nathan Cayless withdrew due to suspension and was replaced by Andrew Lomu while Willie Talau required surgery and was unavailable. After the Australia Test both Lomu and Matt Utai were withdrawn by their clubs for off-season surgery. On arriving in England, English based players Craig Smith and Tevita Vaikona were ruled out due to injury. Later Motu Tony and Robbie Paul were sidelined with injuries and in France Richard Swain left to sign a deal with the Broncos and Stephen Kearney flew home due to a family illness.

Clinton Toopi broke his hand in a scuffle with Nigel Vagana during a team drinking session after the second test. Freeman and team management initially tried to cover up the incident, claiming the injury occurred during the match, before media found out and had a field day.

Name	Club	Australia	Wales	GB	GB	GB	France	Games	Tries	Goals	FGs	Points
Monty Betham	New Zealand Warriors		BE	BE	BE	LK		4	0	0	0	0
Jason Cayless	Sydney Roosters						PR	1	0	0	0	0
Henry Fa'afili	New Zealand Warriors	WG	WG	WG	WG	WG	WG	6	3	0	0	12
Awen Guttenbeil	New Zealand Warriors	BE	SR	LK	LK	SR	BE	6	0	0	0	0
Lance Hohaia	New Zealand Warriors	FE	FE	FE	FE	FE	FE	6	1	7	0	18
Sean Hoppe	St Helens R.F.C.					WG	CE	2	0	0	0	0
Stacey Jones (c)	New Zealand Warriors	HB	HB	HB	HB	HB	HB	6	6	1	0	26
Stephen Kearney	Melbourne Storm	LK	LK	SR	SR			4	1	0	0	4
Ali Lauitiiti	New Zealand Warriors	SR	SR	SR	BE	BE	SR	6	1	0	0	4
Andrew Lomu	Sydney Roosters	BE						1	0	0	0	0
Francis Meli	New Zealand Warriors		WG	WG	WG	CE	WG	5	4	0	0	16
Robbie Paul	Bradford Bulls		FB	FB	FB		HK	4	1	0	0	4
Tony Puletua	Penrith Panthers		BE	BE	BE	BE		4	0	0	0	0
Paul Rauhihi	Bulldogs RLFC	PR	PR	PR	PR	PR	PR	6	0	0	0	0
Jerry Seuseu	New Zealand Warriors	PR	PR	PR	PR	PR	BE	6	1	0	0	4
Michael Smith	Castleford Tigers						SR	1	0	0	0	0
David Solomona	Parramatta Eels	BE	BE	BE	BE		BE	5	0	0	0	0
Richard Swain	Melbourne Storm	HK	HK	HK	HK	HK		5	2	14	0	36
Logan Swann	New Zealand Warriors		BE	BE	BE	BE	BE	5	2	0	0	8
Motu Tony	New Zealand Warriors	BE						1	0	0	0	0
Clinton Toopi	New Zealand Warriors	CE		CE	CE			3	1	0	0	4
Matt Utai	Bulldogs RLFC	WG						1	1	0	0	4
David Vaealiki	Parramatta Eels	FB				FB	FB	3	1	0	0	4
Nigel Vagana	Bulldogs RLFC	CE	CE	CE	CE	CE	CE	6	4	0	0	16
Ruben Wiki	Canberra Raiders	SR	CE		SR	SR	LK	5	1	0	0	4

- Coach: Gary Freeman

== Fixtures ==
The New Zealand side played five test matches while on their European tour and one test in New Zealand before leaving.

=== New Zealand vs Australia ===
12 October 2002

New Zealand	24–32	Australia
Tries: Stacey Jones; Richard Swain; Clinton Toopi; Matt Utai Goals: Richard Swain (4/5)		Tries: Matthew Gidley (2); Scott Hill; Ben Kennedy; Willie Mason; Timana Tahu; Goals: Hazem El Masri (4/7)

Westpac Stadium, Wellington
Attendance: 25,015
Referee: Bill Harrigan (Australia)
Player of the Match: Scott Hill (Australia)

New Zealand	Australia

FB	1	David Vaealiki
LW	2	Henry Fa'afili
RC	3	Nigel Vagana
LC	4	Clinton Toopi
RW	5	Matt Utai
FE	6	Lance Hohaia
HB	7	Stacey Jones (c)
PR	8	Jerry Seuseu
HK	9	Richard Swain
PR	10	Paul Rauhihi
SR	11	Ali Lauiti'iti
SR	12	Ruben Wiki
LK	13	Stephen Kearney
Substitutions:
IC	14	Motu Tony
IC	15	Andrew Lomu
IC	16	Awen Guttenbeil
IC	17	David Solomona
Coach:
(New Zealand) Gary Freeman

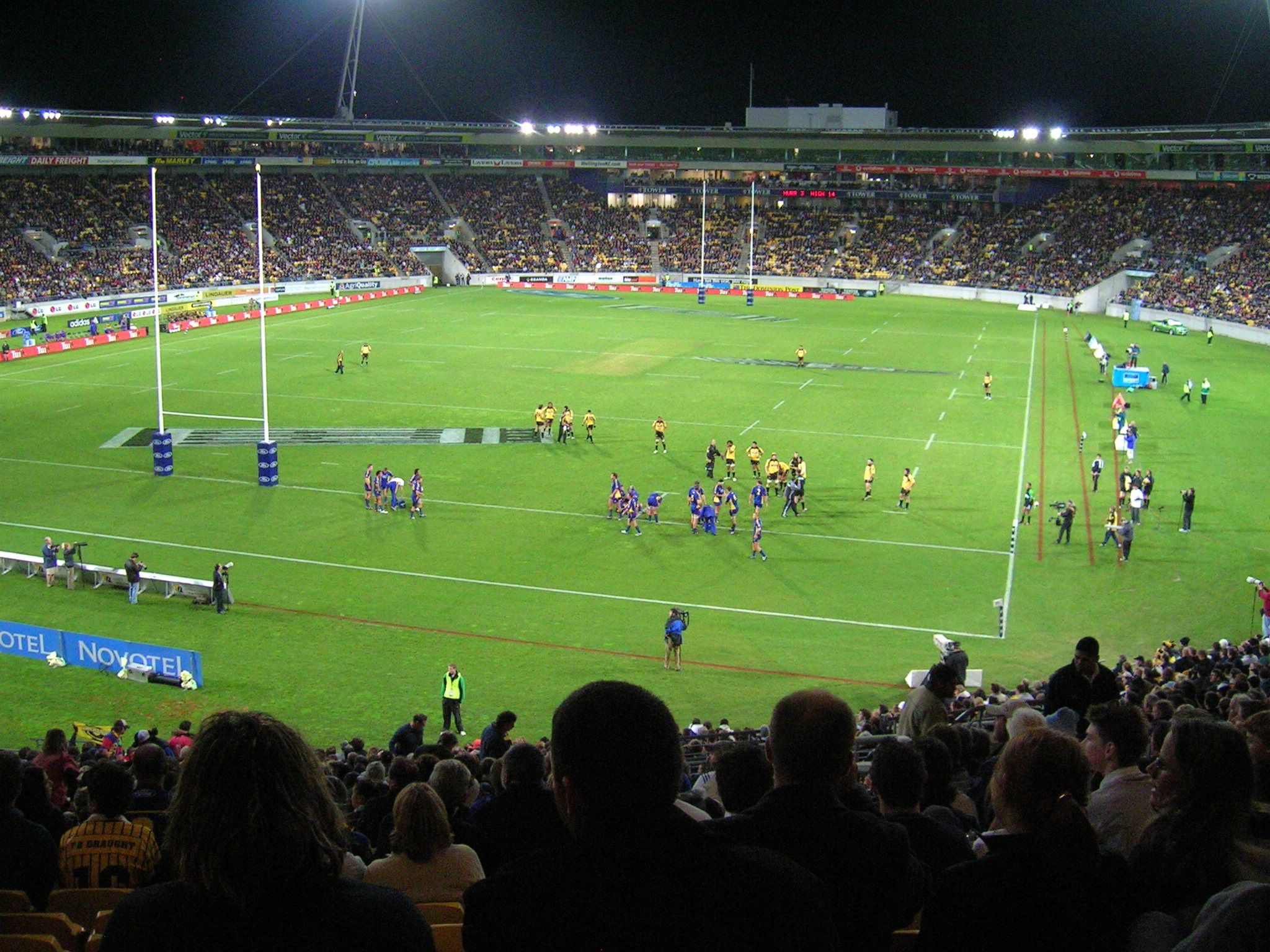

FB	1	Darren Lockyer
LW	2	Timana Tahu
RC	3	Matthew Gidley
LC	4	Brent Tate
RW	5	Hazem El Masri
FE	6	Trent Barrett
HB	7	Brett Kimmorley
PR	8	Shane Webcke
HK	9	Danny Buderus
PR	10	Jason Stevens
SR	11	Gorden Tallis (c)
SR	12	Ben Kennedy
LF	13	Scott Hill
Substitutions:
IC	14	Craig Wing
IC	15	Craig Fitzgibbon
IC	16	Steve Menzies
IC	17	Willie Mason
Coach:
(Australia) Chris Anderson

=== British leg ===
22 October

Hull F.C.	11–28	New Zealand
Tries: Richard Horne, Paul Parker; Goals: Matt Crowther (1); Field Goals: Graham Mackay (1)		Tries: Henry Fa'afili (2), David Vaealiki, Nigel Vagana, Francis Meli; Goals: Lance Hohaia (4)

The Boulevard, Kingston upon Hull
Attendance: 12,092
Referee: Robert Connolly

Hull: Steve Prescott, Paul Parker, Richard Horne, Graham Mackay, Matt Crowther, Jason Smith (c), Tony Smith, Craig Greenhill, Lee Jackson, Scott Logan, Adam Maher, Sean Ryan, Chris Chester. Res: Craig Poucher, Paul Cooke, Richard Fletcher, Paul King. Coach: Shaun McRae

New Zealand: David Vaealiki, Francis Meli, Nigel Vagana, Clinton Toopi, Henry Fa'afili, Motu Tony, Lance Hohaia, Jason Cayless, Monty Betham, Paul Rauhihi, Tony Puletua, Ruben Wiki, Logan Swann. Res: Michael Smith, Richard Swain, Awen Guttenbeil, Stephen Kearney

25 October

St Helens	26–38	New Zealand

Knowsley Road, St. Helens

30 October

England A	12–34	New Zealand

Griffin Park, London

=== Wales vs New Zealand ===
3 November 2002

Wales	22–50	New Zealand
Tries: Paul Atcheson; Hefin O'Hare; Kris Tassell Goals: Lee Briers (5)		Tries: Francis Meli (3); Logan Swann (2); Lance Hohaia; Stacey Jones; Robbie Paul; Goals: Richard Swain (6); Lance Hohaia (1)

Millennium Stadium, Cardiff
Attendance: 8,746
Referee: Steve Ganson (England)
Player of the Match: Stacey Jones (New Zealand)

Wales	New Zealand

FB	1	Damian Gibson
RW	2	Hefin O'Hare
RC	3	Kris Tassell
LC	4	Adam Hughes
LW	5	Chris Smith
SO	6	Lee Briers (c)
SH	7	Mark Lennon
PR	8	Keith Mason
HK	9	Ian Watson
PR	10	Dave Whittle
SR	11	Justin Morgan
SR	12	David Mills
LK	13	Paul Highton
Substitutions:
IC	14	Paul Atcheson
IC	15	Gareth Dean
IC	16	Gareth Price
IC	17	Rob Roberts
Coach:
(England) Neil Kelly

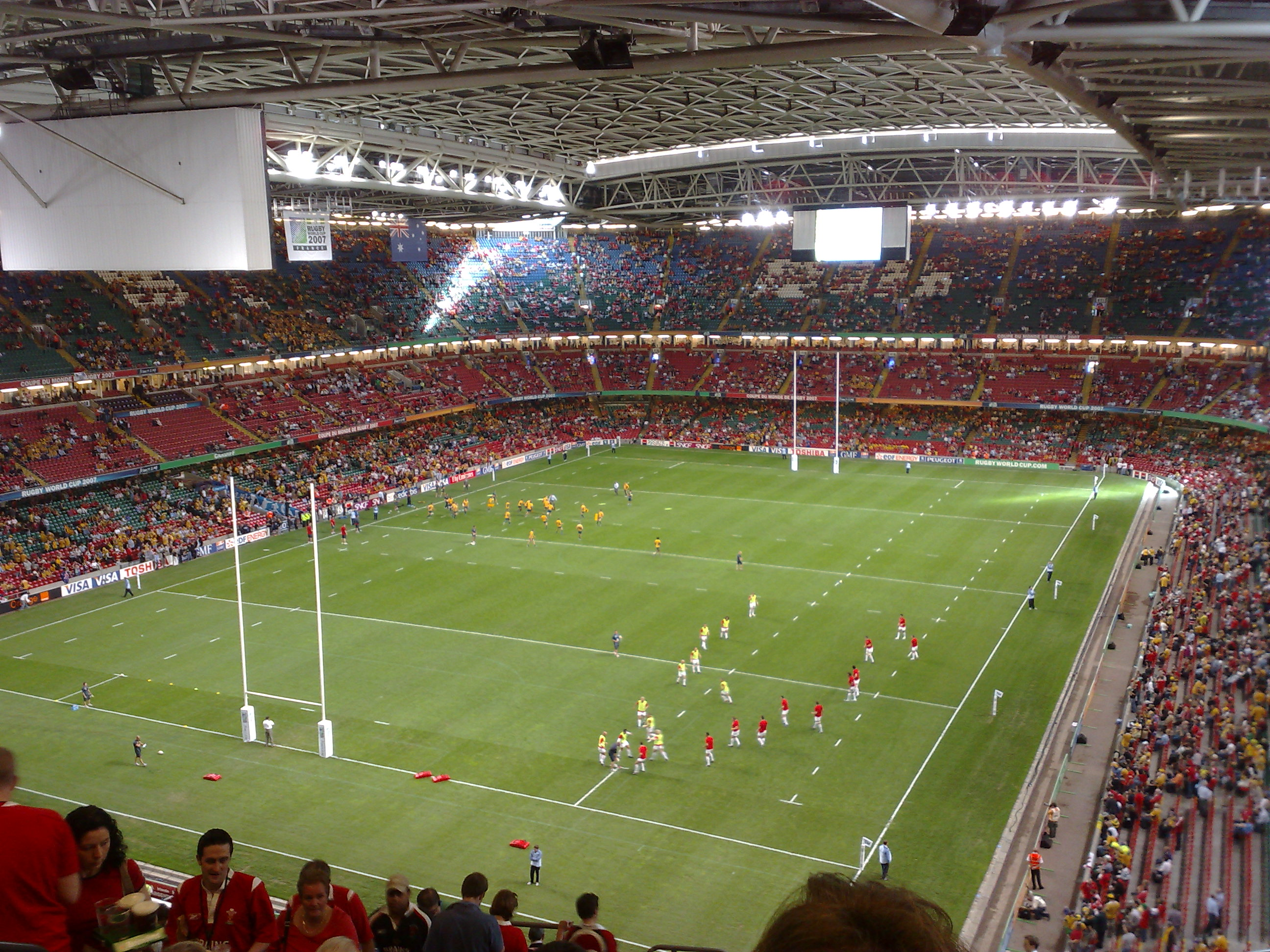

FB	1	Robbie Paul
LW	2	Henry Fa'afili
RC	3	Nigel Vagana
LC	4	Ruben Wiki
RW	5	Francis Meli
FE	6	Lance Hohaia
HB	7	Stacey Jones (c)
PR	8	Jerry Seuseu
HK	9	Richard Swain
PR	10	Paul Rauhihi
SR	11	Ali Lauiti'iti
SR	12	Awen Guttenbeil
LK	13	Stephen Kearney
Substitutions:
IC	14	Monty Betham
IC	15	David Solomona
IC	16	Logan Swann
IC	17	Tony Puletua
Coach:
(New Zealand) Gary Freeman

=== Baskerville Shield ===
After 30 New Zealand vs England / Great Britain test series since 1907, the Baskerville Shield was inaugurated for series between New Zealand and England / Great Britain. The shield is named in honour of Albert Henry Baskerville who organised New Zealand's first ever tour of Great Britain in 1907.

=== Venues ===
The three Baskerville Shield tests took place at the following venues.

Blackburn	Huddersfield	Wigan
Ewood Park	McAlpine Stadium	JJB Stadium
Capacity: 31,000	Capacity: 24,500	Capacity: 25,133

==== 1st Test ====
9 November 2002

Great Britain	16–30	New Zealand
Tries: Jamie Peacock; Leon Pryce Goals: Andy Farrell (4)		Tries: Henry Fa'afili (3); Nigel Vagana (2); Stacey Jones; Goals: Richard Swain (3)

Ewood Park, Blackburn
Attendance: 16,654
Referee: Steve Clark (Australia)

Great Britain	New Zealand

FB	1	Gary Connolly
RW	2	Leon Pryce
RC	3	Martin Gleeson
LC	4	Keith Senior
LW	5	Karl Pratt
SO	6	Kevin Sinfield
SH	7	Paul Deacon
PR	8	Stuart Fielden
HK	9	Keiron Cunningham
PR	10	Barrie McDermott
SR	11	Andy Farrell (c)
SR	12	Adrian Morley
LK	13	Mike Forshaw
Substitutions:
IC	14	Lee Gilmour
IC	15	Chris Joynt
IC	16	Paul Anderson
IC	17	Jamie Peacock
Coach:
(Australia) David Waite

FB	1	Robbie Paul
LW	2	Henry Fa'afili
RC	3	Nigel Vagana
LC	4	Clinton Toopi
RW	5	Francis Meli
FE	6	Lance Hohaia
HB	7	Stacey Jones (c)
PR	8	Jerry Seuseu
HK	9	Richard Swain
PR	10	Paul Rauhihi
SR	11	Ali Lauiti'iti
SR	12	Stephen Kearney
LK	13	Awen Guttenbeil
Substitutions:
IC	14	Monty Betham
IC	15	David Solomona
IC	16	Logan Swann
IC	17	Tony Puletua
Coach:
(New Zealand) Gary Freeman

Henry Fa'afili scored three tries in the 30–16 first test win over Great Britain at Ewood Park, the first Kiwis hat-trick against the Lions in 97 matches dating back to 1907. His tries all came in the second half as the Kiwis rallied from a 10–6 halftime deficit to win comfortably.

==== 2nd Test ====
16 November 2002

Great Britain	14–14	New Zealand
Tries: Martin Gleeson; Leon Pryce Goals: Andy Farrell (3)		Tries: Stephen Kearney; Francis Meli; Ruben Wiki; Goals: Richard Swain (1)

Alfred McAlpine Stadium, Huddersfield
Attendance: 23,604
Referee: Steve Clark (Australia)

Great Britain	New Zealand

FB	1	Gary Connolly
RW	2	Lee Gilmour
RC	3	Martin Gleeson
LC	4	Keith Senior
LW	5	Leon Pryce
SO	6	Paul Sculthorpe
SH	7	Paul Deacon
PR	8	Terry O'Connor
HK	9	James Lowes
PR	10	Stuart Fielden
SR	11	Jamie Peacock
SR	12	Andy Farrell (c)
LK	13	Mike Forshaw
Substitutions:
IC	14	Kevin Sinfield
IC	15	Richard Horne
IC	16	Paul Anderson
IC	17	Danny Orr
Coach:
(Australia) David Waite

FB	1	Robbie Paul
LW	2	Henry Fa'afili
RC	3	Nigel Vagana
LC	4	Clinton Toopi
RW	5	Francis Meli
FE	6	Lance Hohaia
HB	7	Stacey Jones (c)
PR	8	Jerry Seuseu
HK	9	Richard Swain
PR	10	Paul Rauhihi
SR	11	Ruben Wiki
SR	12	Stephen Kearney
LK	13	Awen Guttenbeil
Substitutions:
IC	14	Tony Puletua
IC	15	Ali Lauiti'iti
IC	16	Monty Betham
IC	17	Logan Swann
Coach:
(New Zealand) Gary Freeman

==== 3rd Test ====
23 November 2002

Great Britain	16–10	New Zealand
Tries: Martin Gleeson; Paul Sculthorpe; Keith Senior; Goals: Andy Farrell (2)		Tries: Stacey Jones; Ali Lauiti'iti Goals: Stacey Jones (1)

JJB Stadium, Wigan
Attendance: 22,247
Referee: Steve Clark (Australia)

Great Britain	New Zealand

FB	1	Gary Connolly
RW	2	Leon Pryce
RC	3	Martin Gleeson
LC	4	Keith Senior
LW	5	Lee Gilmour
SO	6	Paul Sculthorpe
SH	7	Paul Deacon
PR	8	Stuart Fielden
HK	9	James Lowes
PR	10	Barrie McDermott
SR	11	Adrian Morley
SR	12	Andy Farrell (c)
LK	13	Mike Forshaw
Substitutions:
IC	14	Danny Orr
IC	15	Jamie Peacock
IC	16	Paul Anderson
IC	17	Richard Horne
Coach:
(Australia) David Waite

FB	1	David Vaealiki
LW	2	Henry Fa'afili
RC	3	Nigel Vagana
LC	4	Sean Hoppe
RW	5	Francis Meli
FE	6	Lance Hohaia
HB	7	Stacey Jones (c)
PR	8	Jerry Seuseu
HK	9	Richard Swain
PR	10	Paul Rauhihi
SR	11	Ruben Wiki
SR	12	Awen Guttenbeil
LK	13	Monty Betham
Substitutions:
IC	14	Tony Puletua
IC	15	David Solomona
IC	16	Ali Lauiti'iti
IC	17	Logan Swann
Coach:
(New Zealand) Gary Freeman

=== France vs New Zealand ===
30 November 2002

France	10–36	New Zealand
Tries: Jérôme Guisset; Claude Sirvent Goals: Laurent Frayssinous (2)		Tries: Stacey Jones (2); Nigel Vagana (2); Jerry Seuseu; David Vaealiki; Goals: Lance Hohaia (6)

Stade Aimé Giral, Perpignan
Attendance: 6,500
Referee: Robert Connolly (England)

France	New Zealand

FB	1	Michael Van Snick
RW	2	Renaud Guigue
RC	3	Claude Sirvent
LC	4	Arnaud Dulac
LW	5	Fourcade Abasse
SO	6	Laurent Frayssinous
SH	7	Julien Rinaldi
PR	8	Jérôme Guisset
HK	9	David Berthezène
PR	10	Romain Gagliazzo
SR	11	Pascal Jampy (c)
SR	12	Sébastien Raguin
LK	13	Laurent Carrasco
Substitutions:
IC	14	Olivier Pramil
IC	15	Jamal Fakir
IC	16	Jean-Christophe Borlin
IC	17	Julien Gerin
Coach:
(France) Gilles Dumas

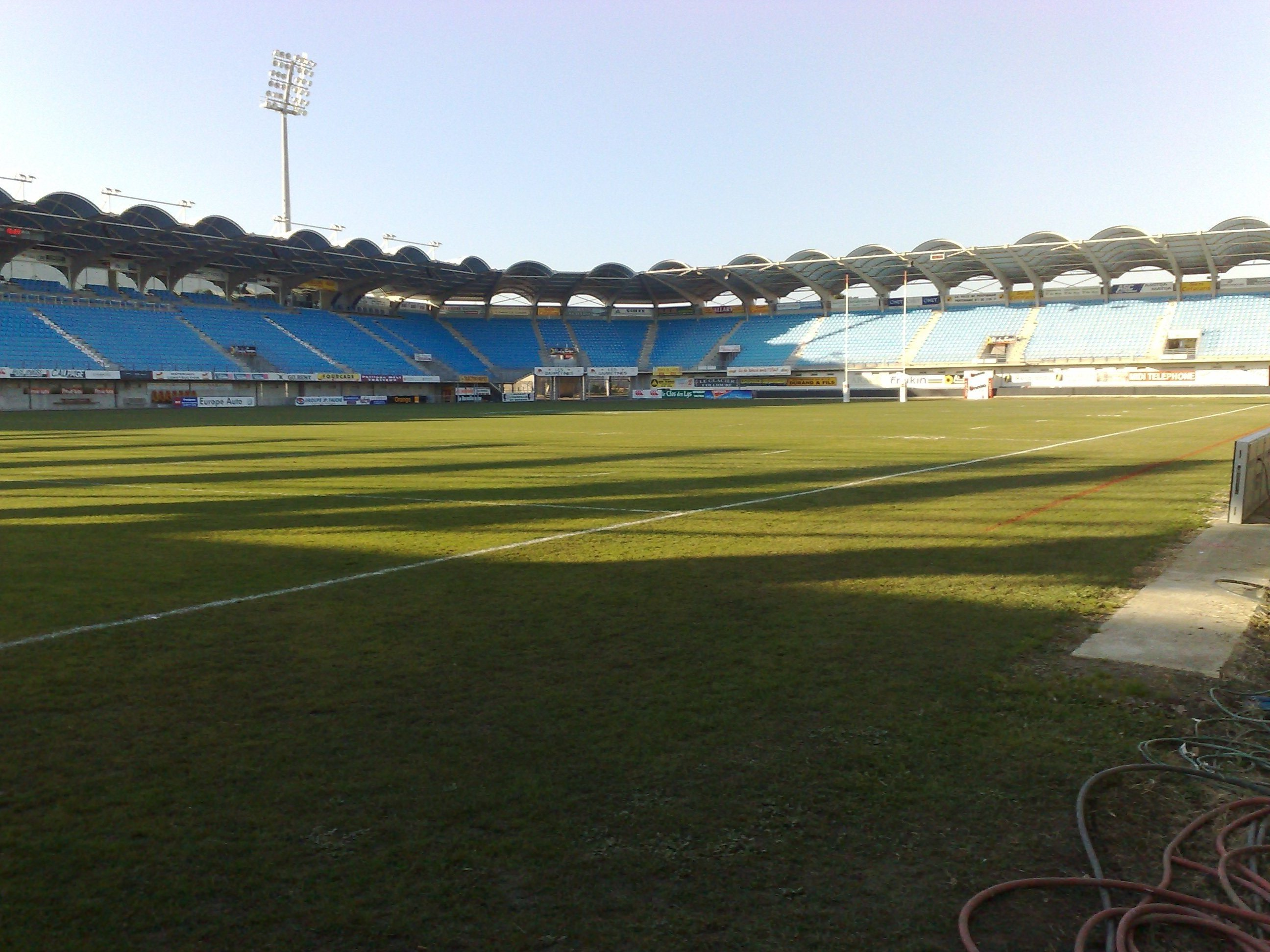

FB	1	David Vaealiki
LW	2	Henry Fa'afili
RC	3	Nigel Vagana
LC	4	Sean Hoppe
RW	5	Francis Meli
FE	6	Lance Hohaia
HB	7	Stacey Jones (c)
PR	8	Jason Cayless
HK	9	Richard Swain
PR	10	Paul Rauhihi
SR	11	Ali Lauiti'iti
SR	12	Michael Smith
LK	13	Ruben Wiki
Substitutions:
IC	14	Awen Guttenbeil
IC	15	David Solomona
IC	16	Jerry Seuseu
IC	17	Logan Swann
Coach:
(New Zealand) Gary Freeman

== Aftermath ==
New Zealand halfback Stacey Jones won the George Smith Medal as player of the series against Great Britain. The tour was Freeman's last as head coach. In 2003 Daniel Anderson was named as the new Kiwis coach.
