= Dene Halatau =

New Zealand international rugby league footballer

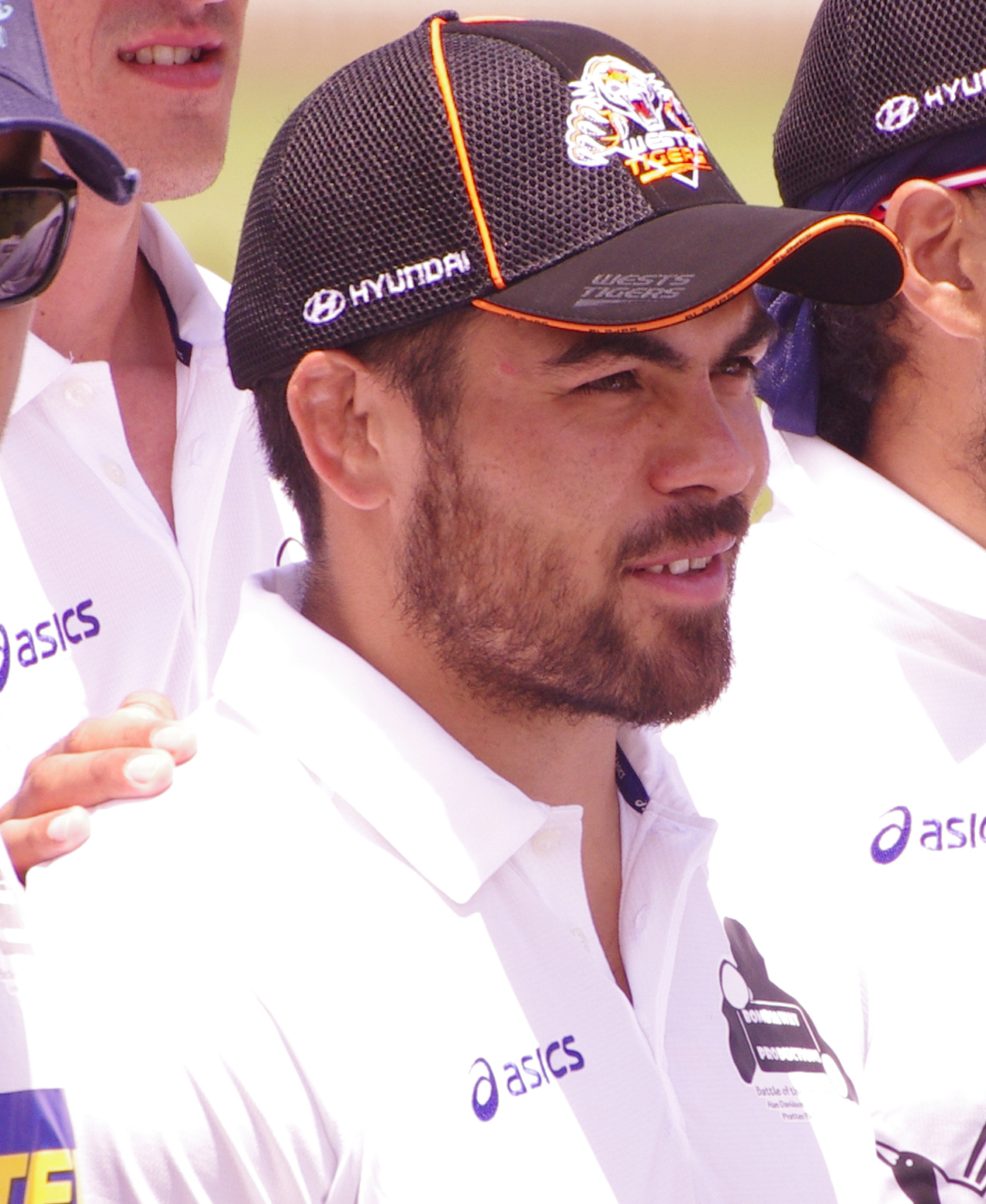

Personal information
- Full name: Dene La Halatau
- Born: 27 January 1983 (age 43) Invercargill, New Zealand

Playing information
- Height: 178 cm (5 ft 10 in)
- Weight: 95 kg (14 st 13 lb)
- Position: Hooker, Lock, Second-row, Centre
Club
Years	Team	Pld	T	G	FG	P
2003–09	Wests Tigers	128	17	0	0	68
2010–13	Canterbury Bulldogs	69	4	0	0	16
2014–16	Wests Tigers	52	4	0	0	16
	Total	249	25	0	0	100
Representative
Years	Team	Pld	T	G	FG	P
2004–09	New Zealand	15	0	0	0	0

Dene Halatau (born 27 January 1983) is a New Zealand former professional rugby league footballer who previously played for the Wests Tigers and the Canterbury-Bankstown Bulldogs of the National Rugby League. Halatau was part of the Wests Tigers team that won the 2005 NRL Premiership. Halatau is New Zealand national representative who was part of their 2008 Rugby League World Cup winning squad.

== Early years ==
Born in Invercargill, New Zealand, Halatau moved to Australia as a 4-year-old and played his junior rugby league for the Merrylands Rams and North Ryde Hawks before being signed by the Wests Tigers. Halatau was educated at Westfields Sports High School. He is of Niuean descent.

== Playing career ==
=== 2003 ===
In Round 13 of the 2003 NRL season, Halatau made his NRL debut for the Wests Tigers against the Manly-Warringah Sea Eagles at Leichhardt Oval off the interchange bench in the Tigers 38–30 loss. In Halatau's third match in Round 18 against the Cronulla-Sutherland Sharks at Leichhardt Oval, he scored his first and second tries in the 44–12 win. He finished his debut year in the NRL with him playing in 9 matches and scoring 3 tries.

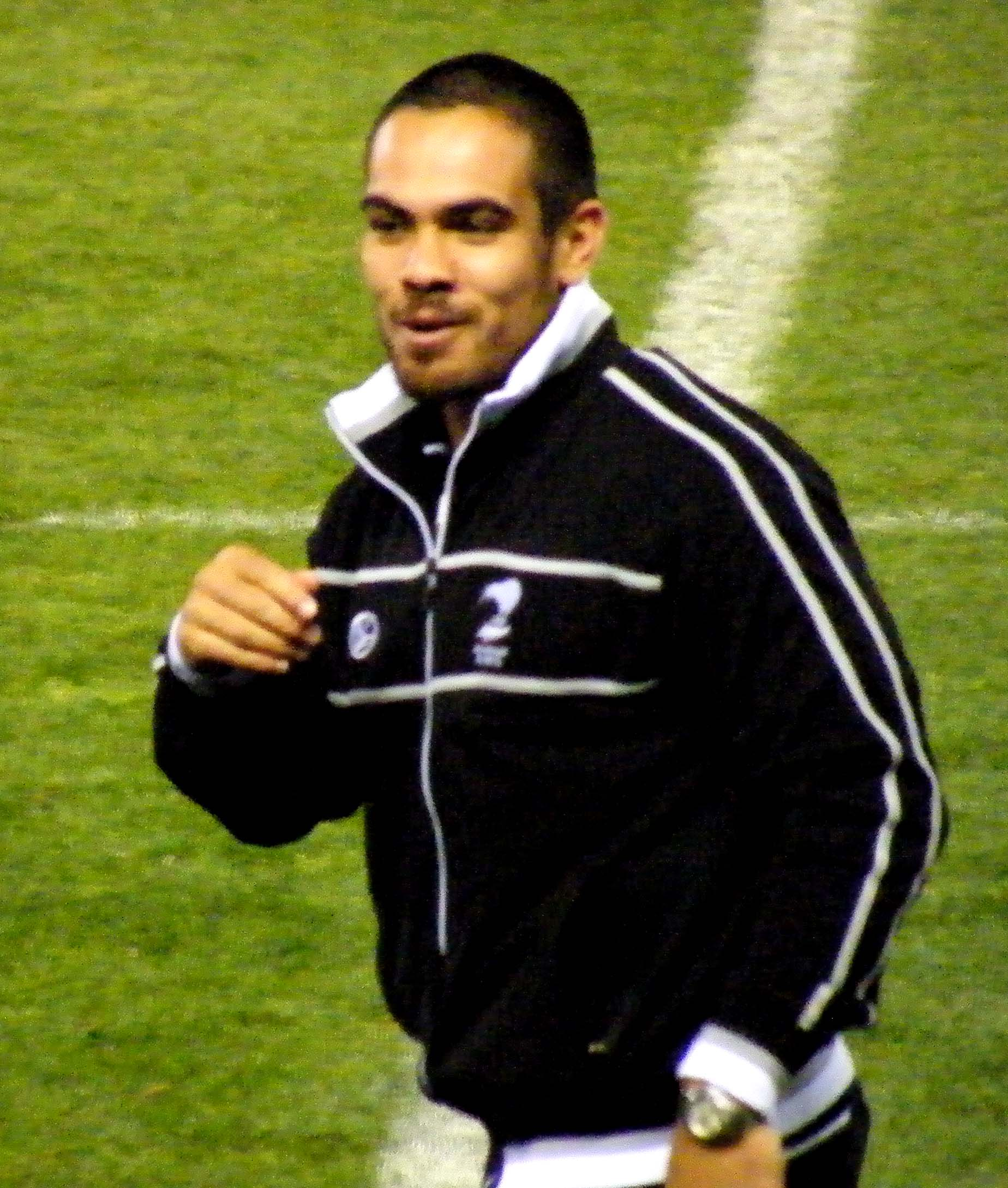
Halatau at the RLWC in 2008

=== 2004 ===
Halatau finished the year with 22 matches and 4 tries. In November, he was selected for the New Zealand national rugby league team making his test debut at hooker against France in the 24–20 win at Stade d'Albert Domec. He later said, "I made my debut, had to learn the haka and was pretty nervous. I roomed with Wairangi Koopu from the Warriors and he taught me in France. His advice was don't worry about the mistakes, just do it with pride and passion. As long as you do that the mistakes don't matter."

=== 2005 ===
Halatau played off the interchange bench for New Zealand in the 2005 ANZAC Test at Suncorp Stadium, as the Kiwis lost 32–16. Halatau said, "I've grown up going to Australian schools and most of my friends are Aussies, but I've always held my New Zealand passport and I've never got Australian citizenship. I don't know why, but other than my immediate family, all of my other relatives live in New Zealand."

Later in the season Halatau was moved from the interchange bench to lock forward for the finals campaign. Halatau was awarded the Man of the Match for his two try effort against St George Illawarra Dragons in the Preliminary Final 20–12 victory and a week later in the 2005 NRL Grand Final, he played at lock in the Wests Tigers 30–16 win over the North Queensland Cowboys. Halatau finished the year with 4 tries from 22 matches.

=== 2006 ===
Playing in 14 NRL matches in 2006, Halatau also played 3 matches at hooker for New Zealand in the Tri-Nations.

=== 2007 ===
Halatau was selected to play for New Zealand at hooker in the 2007 ANZAC Test in the Kiwis 30–6 loss at Suncorp Stadium. Halatau finished 2007 with one try from 21 matches. He also went on the 2007 All Golds tour, playing at hooker in all the 5 matches.

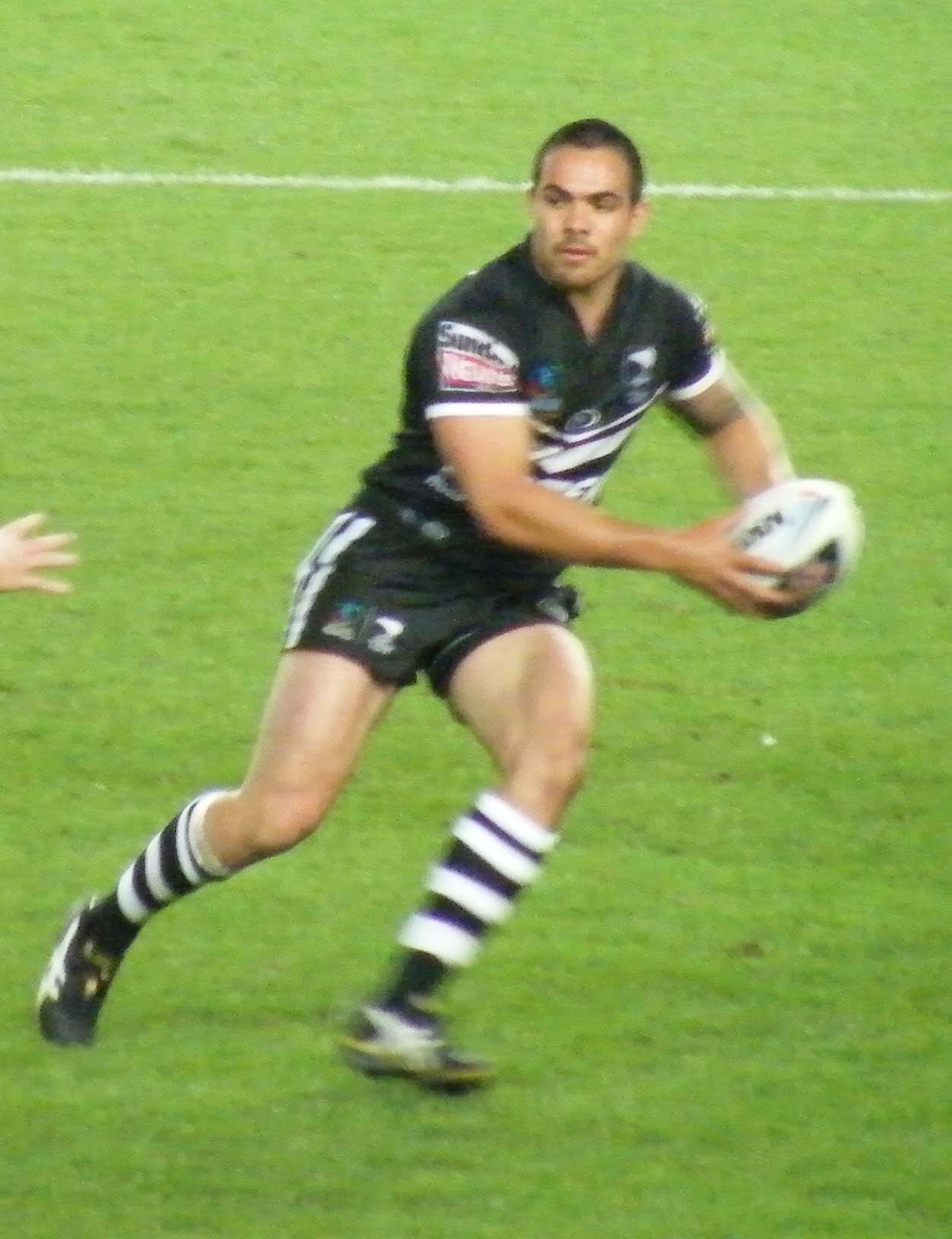
Halatau playing for New Zealand at the 2008 RLWC

=== 2008 ===
In Round 15 against the Brisbane Broncos at Suncorp Stadium, Halatau played his 100th NRL career match and scored a try in the Tigers 19–18 loss. Halatau finished the 2008 NRL season with him playing in 22 matches and scoring three tries.

Halatau was a member of the New Zealand team which defeated Australia 34–20 in the 2008 World Cup Final at Suncorp Stadium.

=== 2009 ===
Halatau played in the 2009 ANZAC Test at Suncorp Stadium in the Kiwis 38–10 loss. He finished the season with 18 matches and 2 tries.

Halatau signed a three-year deal with the Canterbury-Bankstown Bulldogs commencing in 2010. He said, "I just needed a change. I'd been at the Tigers since I was a teenager and played under Tim Sheens for a while. I was comfortable and but '09 I was inconsistent and didn't think I was in a good place."

=== 2010 ===
In Round 3 against the Sydney Roosters at ANZ Stadium, Halatau made his club debut for Canterbury-Bankstown in the 60–14 win. Halatau played in eight matches for Canterbury-Bankstown in an injury interrupted season. He later conceded, "When I moved to the Bulldogs I tore the MCL in my right knee six times. I had surgery twice and had two repairs done. That was the most frustrating, I almost gave up then and there and almost called it quits."

=== 2011 ===
In Round 23 against the Cronulla-Sutherland Sharks at Remondis Stadium, Halatau scored his first try as a Canterbury player before succumbing to a season ending ankle injury. He finished the season with one try from 19 appearances.

=== 2012 ===
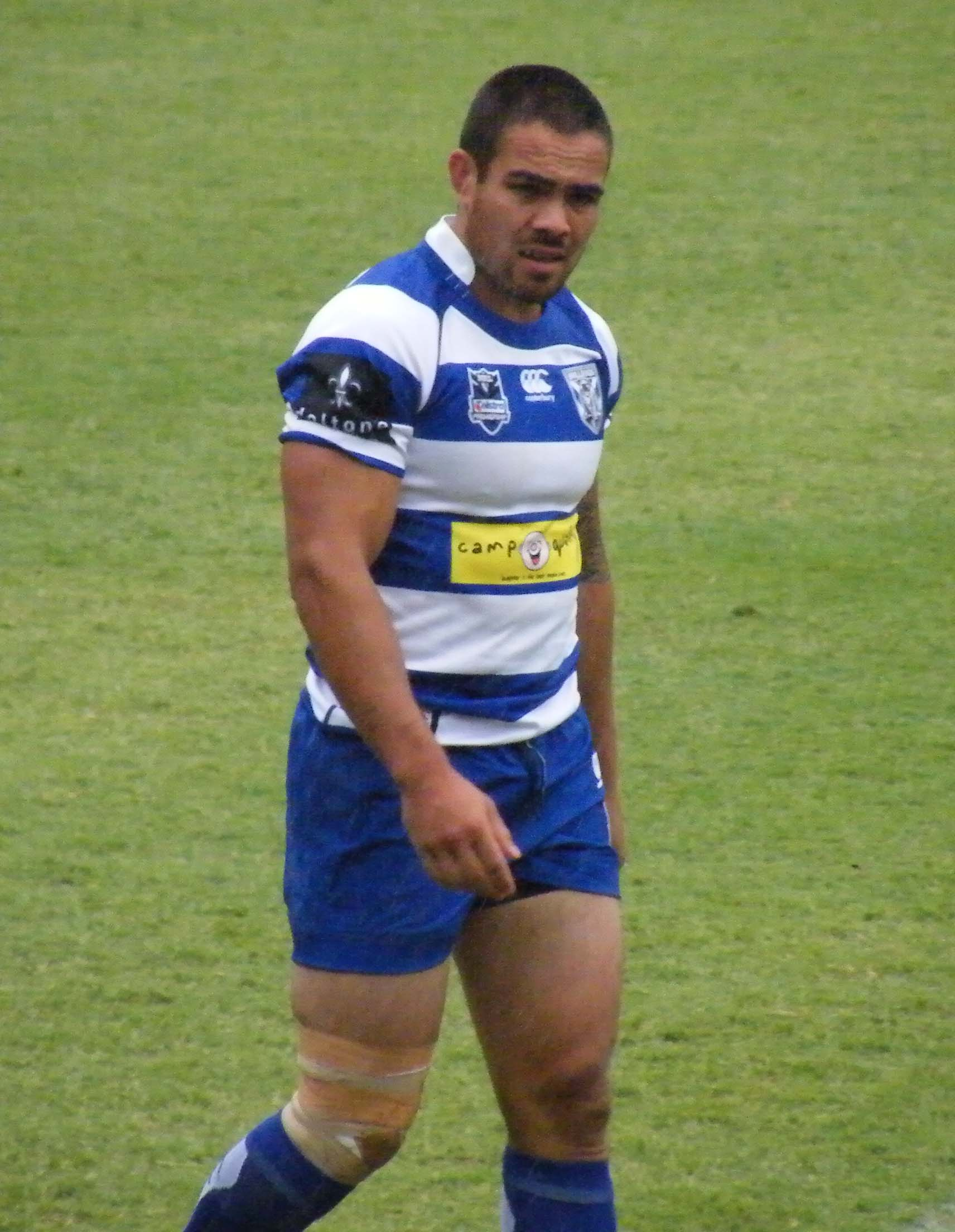
Halatau in 2012

In 2012, Halatau was playing second-row in the starting team. He injured his knee in round 19 and was unable to return to first grade. Halatau was named 18th man for Canterbury's 2012 NRL Grand Final team against the Melbourne Storm with the club losing 14–4. He finished the season with him playing 17 matches and scoring a try.

=== 2013 ===
On 28 July, it was announced that Halatau would be returning to his previous club Wests Tigers on a two-year contract from 2014. CEO Grant Meyer said, "His experience and leadership as a senior player is going to be invaluable for some of our younger players. We have been very clear that we are investing very heavily in our juniors and a player like Dene will provide leadership and mentoring for the group." Halatau played exclusively from the interchange bench in 2013, but made appearances in all 25 of Canterbury's matches and scored two tries.

=== 2014 ===
After breaking his left ankle in a pre-season trial, Halatau was ruled out for at least four months. He played his return match in Round 14 against the South Sydney Rabbitohs off the interchange bench in the Tigers 32–10 loss. In Round 18 against the Manly-Warringah Sea Eagles at Brookvale Oval, Halatau played in his 200th NRL match in the Tigers 40–8 loss. He finished his return year to the Wests Tigers with him playing in seven matches.

With the introduction of concussion rules to the NRL in 2014, Halatau saw his value as a utility rise. Peter Mulholland said, "Every team is going to need someone on the bench who can play half a dozen positions. Dene Halatau is the perfect player- someone who can play 1, 7 or 9".

=== 2015 ===
Better luck with injuries saw Halatau play in 22 matches and score 4 tries in the 2015 NRL season, equaling his best season tally for the Tigers since the 2005 season. Halatau made his debut as captain in Round 11 against the North Queensland Cowboys in the Tigers 8–0 loss at Campbelltown Stadium. He captained the team a further 2 times while Robbie Farah and Aaron Woods were away on State of Origin duties, including a surprise 34–6 upset victory over the South Sydney Rabbitohs in Round 14. In Round 19 against the Brisbane Broncos, Halatau played his 150th club match for the Tigers in the 42–16 loss at Suncorp Stadium. The Wests Tigers failed to win any of the games Halatau was absent for the season.

At season's end, Halatau signed with the Wests Tigers for a further season. Speaking of his career beyond 2016, Halatau said, "I'm 32 now and I've played longer than I thought I would have played. I feel like I'm still offering a bit to the team. I'm open ended next year, if they want to extend it another year. If they don't want to and there's nothing else out there, then I'm prepared to step into life after football."

=== 2016 ===
With Robbie Farah injured, playing State of Origin, and then dropped to reserve grade, Halatau was the first choice as hooker for the majority of the season. On 18 July 2016, Halatau announced he would retire at the end of the year. He said, "I was grateful to the club, JT and the coaching staff for giving me this year. While I'm still feeling okay I think it's the right time to hang the boots up." Phil Gould said, "He has always been one of those quiet achievers in our game. A real team man, he has been admired by his peers. They value his toughness and his outstanding work ethic. His tremendous versatility has also been an asset." Halatau finished his last year in the NRL playing in 23 matches for the Tigers.

== Post-playing career ==
Halatau was made an NRL ambassador in 2017.

In 2021 Halatau claimed his first wooden spoon, coming last in the Nuffies NFL fantasy league.

In 2024 Halatau claimed his second wooden spoon, coming last in the Nuffies NFL fantasy league.
