= Taniela Tuiaki =

NZ & Tonga international rugby league footballer

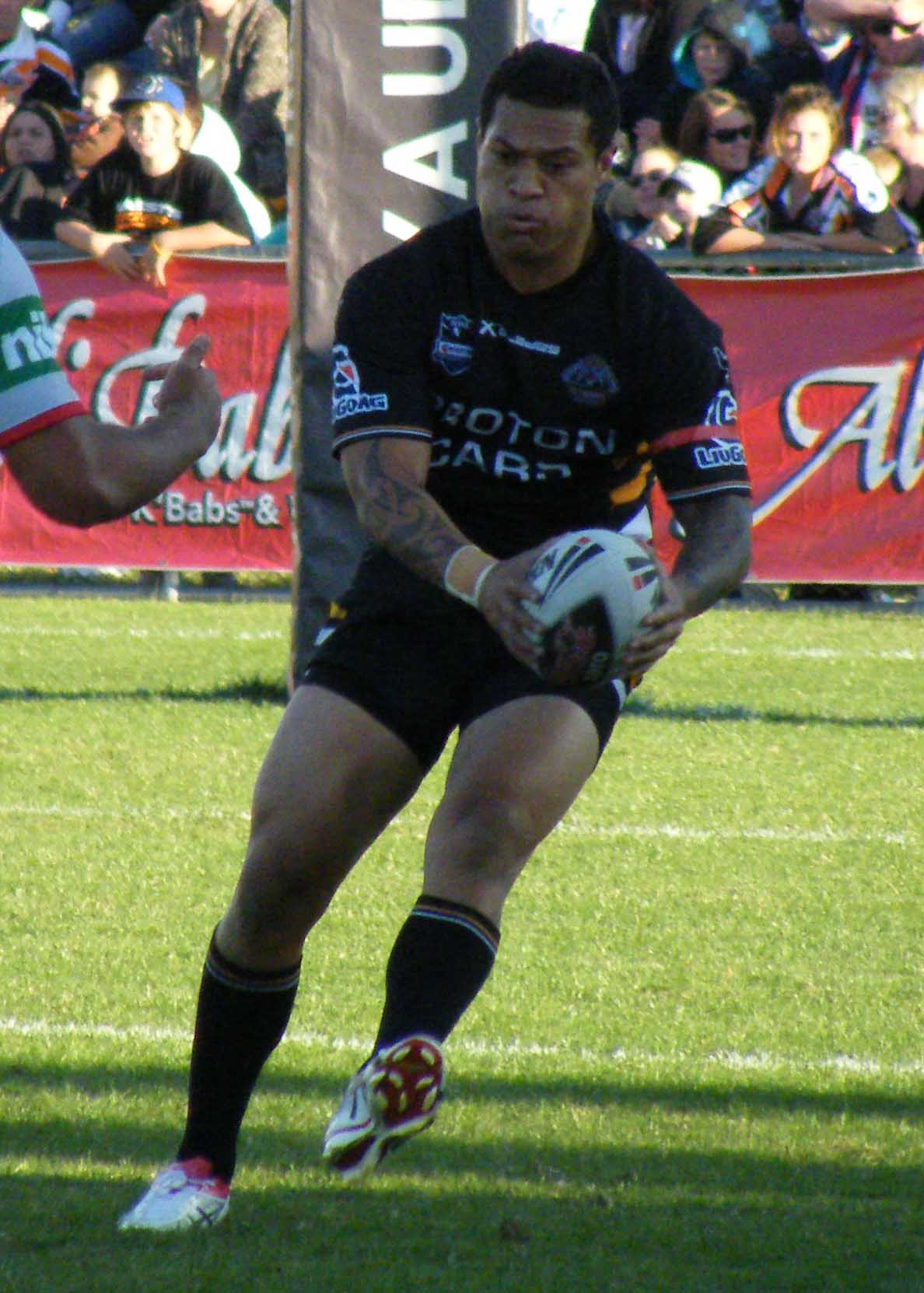
- Tuiaki in 2009

Personal information
- Born: 2 May 1982 (age 44) Auckland, New Zealand

Playing information
- Height: 185 cm (6 ft 1 in)
- Weight: 105 kg (16 st 7 lb)
- Position: Wing
Club
Years	Team	Pld	T	G	FG	P
2006–09	Wests Tigers	78	42	0	0	168
Representative
Years	Team	Pld	T	G	FG	P
2006	Tonga	3	3	0	0	12
2007	New Zealand	4	1	0	0	4

Taniela Tuiaki (born 2 May 1982 in Auckland, New Zealand) is a former professional rugby league footballer who played on the wing for the Wests Tigers in the NRL.

== Playing career ==
=== Club ===
Tuiaki played junior football with North Curl Curl. He made his NRL debut after switching from Rugby Union, playing on the wing for the Wests Tigers against the New Zealand Warriors at Mt Smart Stadium in round 11 of the 2006 season. He scored two tries on debut, and was a regular on the wing for the next three and a half years.

Playing in every club game for 2007, Tuiaki scored 6 tries in the last 7 weeks. In the second half of the season, he spent a three-week stint in the second row. He managed 20 games in 2008, scoring his first treble against the Warriors at Leichhardt Oval on 29 June.

In round 23 of the 2009 season, Tuiaki scored three tries, taking him to the top of the try-scoring table for the season with a total of 21. A broken ankle in round 24 while playing against the Parramatta Eels sidelined Tuiaki for the remainder of the season. At the time he was leading or well-ranked in many NRL stats, including line-breaks and tackle busts.

In 2009, Tuiaki was named winger of the year in the Dally M awards and the Big League team of the year. He also set the record for most tries scored in a season by a Wests Tigers player.

Still suffering from the injury suffered at the end of 2009, Tuiaki failed to make any appearances in the 2010 season. There were some doubts whether Tuiaki would ever make a full recovery, and Wests Tigers signed him to an incentive-based contract for 2011, with bonuses for playing in set number of games.

Despite undergoing three operations, the ankle had still not gained full strength when Tuiaki announced his retirement before the start of the 2011 season, saying, "It's a real disappointment. I can't keep running, even after all these surgeries – it's not getting better."

=== Representative ===
Tuiaki represented Tonga in two international matches against England in 2006, scoring a try in each game.

In October 2007 Tuiaki was cleared to play for New Zealand against Australia in the 2007 Centenary Test. He went on to play in the three match series loss to the Great Britain Lions in England in October–November 2007, scoring a try in the final game.

He was named in the New Zealand training squad for the 2008 Rugby League World Cup.

Tuiaki was named in the Tonga squad for the 2008 Rugby League World Cup. Although he was not selected for the final New Zealand squad, Tuiaki was not allowed to play for Tonga as the Rugby League International Federation (RLIF) deemed him ineligible. Tonga appealed the decision but the NSW Supreme Court declined to grant an injunction which would enable Tuiaki and Fuifui Moimoi to play in Tonga's opening match.
