= Fuifui Moimoi =

Tongan International rugby league player

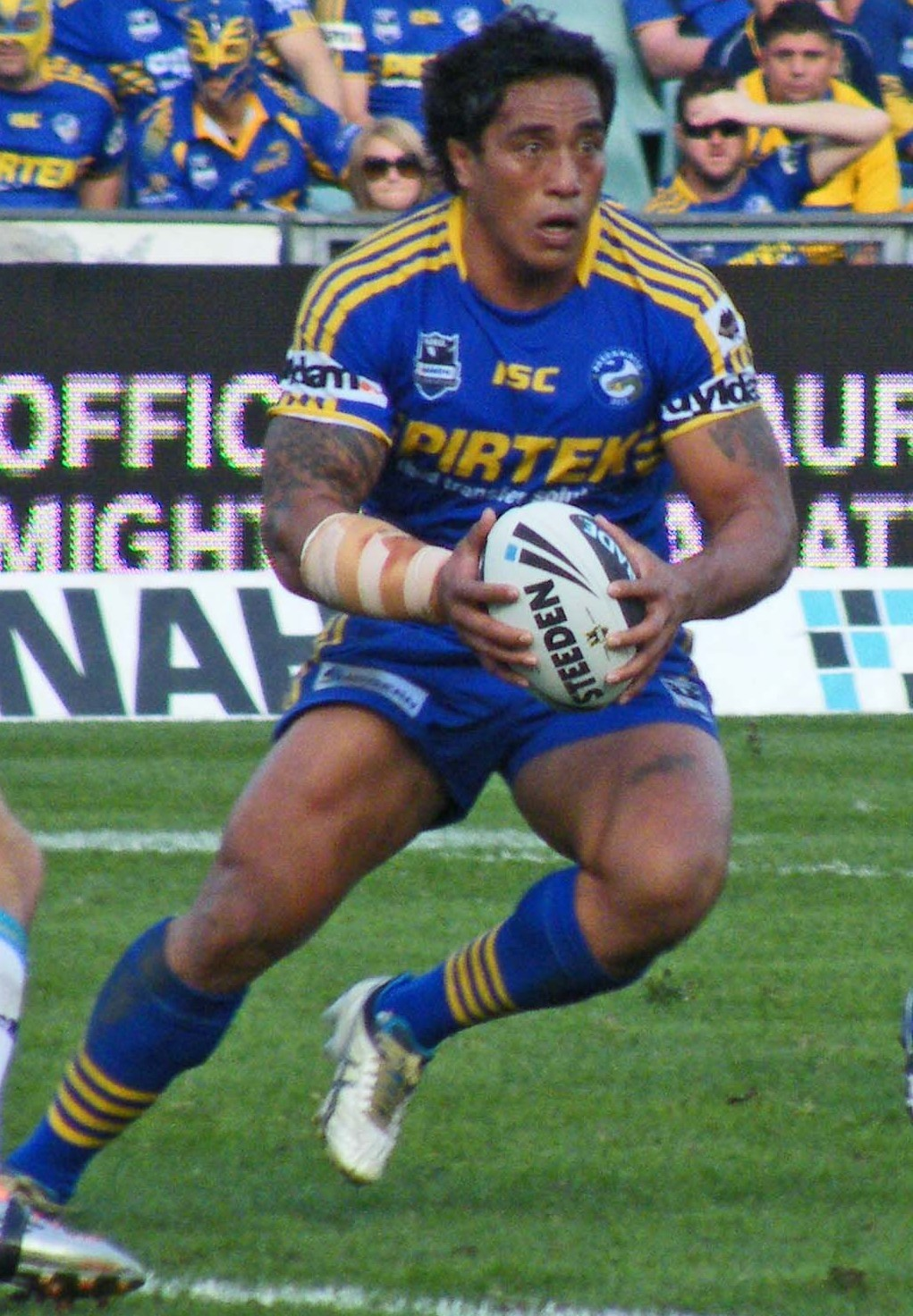

Personal information
- Full name: Fuifui Moana Moimoi
- Born: 26 September 1979 (age 47) (Note: Most sources state that Moimoi was born on 26 September 1979, though some sources indicate 1980 as his year of birth. The Sydney Morning Herald commented in 2006: "The enigmatic prop's age is a topic of debate amongst teammates after he changed his date of birth, listed last year as 1980 but now down as 1979." Workington Town listed his date of birth as 29 September 1979, which is not supported by other sources.) Nuku'alofa, Tonga
- Height: 6 ft 0 in (1.83 m)
- Weight: 16 st 7 lb (105 kg)

Playing information

Rugby league
- Position: Prop
Club
Years	Team	Pld	T	G	FG	P
2004–14	Parramatta Eels	201	22	0	0	88
2015–16	Leigh Centurions	45	11	1	0	46
2017–18	Toronto Wolfpack	20	12	0	0	48
2018–20	Workington Town	43	13	1	0	54
2021–22	Rochdale Hornets	34	13	0	0	52
	Total	343	71	2	0	288
Representative
Years	Team	Pld	T	G	FG	P
2006–13	Tonga	9	0	0	0	0
2007–11	New Zealand	12	0	0	0	0

Rugby union
- Position: Prop
Club
Years	Team	Pld	T	G	FG	P
2018	Bradford & Bingley RFC	5	1	0	0	5
2021	York RI RUFC	1	0	0	0	0
	Total	6	1	0	0	5
- Source: As of 1 May 2022

Fuifui Moana Moimoi (born 26 September 1979) is a rugby league footballer who plays as a prop.

He most notably played for the Parramatta Eels in the National Rugby League (NRL) from 2004 to 2014, in addition to playing for Leigh Centurions in the RFL Championship from 2015 to 2016 and for Toronto Wolfpack in League 1 in 2017, Workington Town and Rochdale Hornets. A New Zealand and Tonga international representative forward, Moimoi made over 200 NRL appearances for Parramatta where he attained cult status among Parramatta fans. In 2018, he briefly played rugby union for Bradford & Bingley RFC.

== Background ==
He was born in Nuku'alofa, Tonga.

His brother-in-law is NFL player Star Lotulelei.

== Playing career ==
=== 2000s ===
A Point Chevalier Pirates and Glenora Bears junior, Moimoi was spotted by then New Zealand Warriors coach Daniel Anderson in 2002 while playing in the Bartercard Cup for the Mt Albert Lions. Moimoi then joined the South Sydney Rabbitohs for the 2003 NRL season as a trialist but departed the club and joined Parramatta. In 2007, Moimoi spoke to the Sydney Morning Herald about his departure from Souths saying that he was frustrated with the minimal game time and chances head coach Paul Langmack was giving him. Moimoi claimed that he attended a training session at Redfern Oval and only trained for 10 minutes before walking off. Langmack reportedly said "Where are you going?" Moimoi replied "I'm going home. I play 10 minutes, I train 10 minutes."

He made his first grade debut for the Parramatta in round 6 of the 2004 NRL season against Manly-Warringah at Brookvale Oval.

In the 2005 NRL season, Moimoi made 8 appearances as Parramatta won the minor premiership and were favourites to take out the premiership. Moimoi missed the finals series through injury as Parramatta were defeated 29–0 in the preliminary final by North Queensland at Telstra Stadium.

On 10 September 2007, News.com.au reported Australian selectors have inquired about the international eligibility of Moimoi. Moimoi was born in Tonga, grew up in New Zealand. Moimoi is eligible to play for Tonga as well as either Australia or New Zealand. Australian Rugby League chief executive Geoff Carr revealed Australian selectors asked about the eligibility of Moimoi. He has also represented American Samoa in 2000.

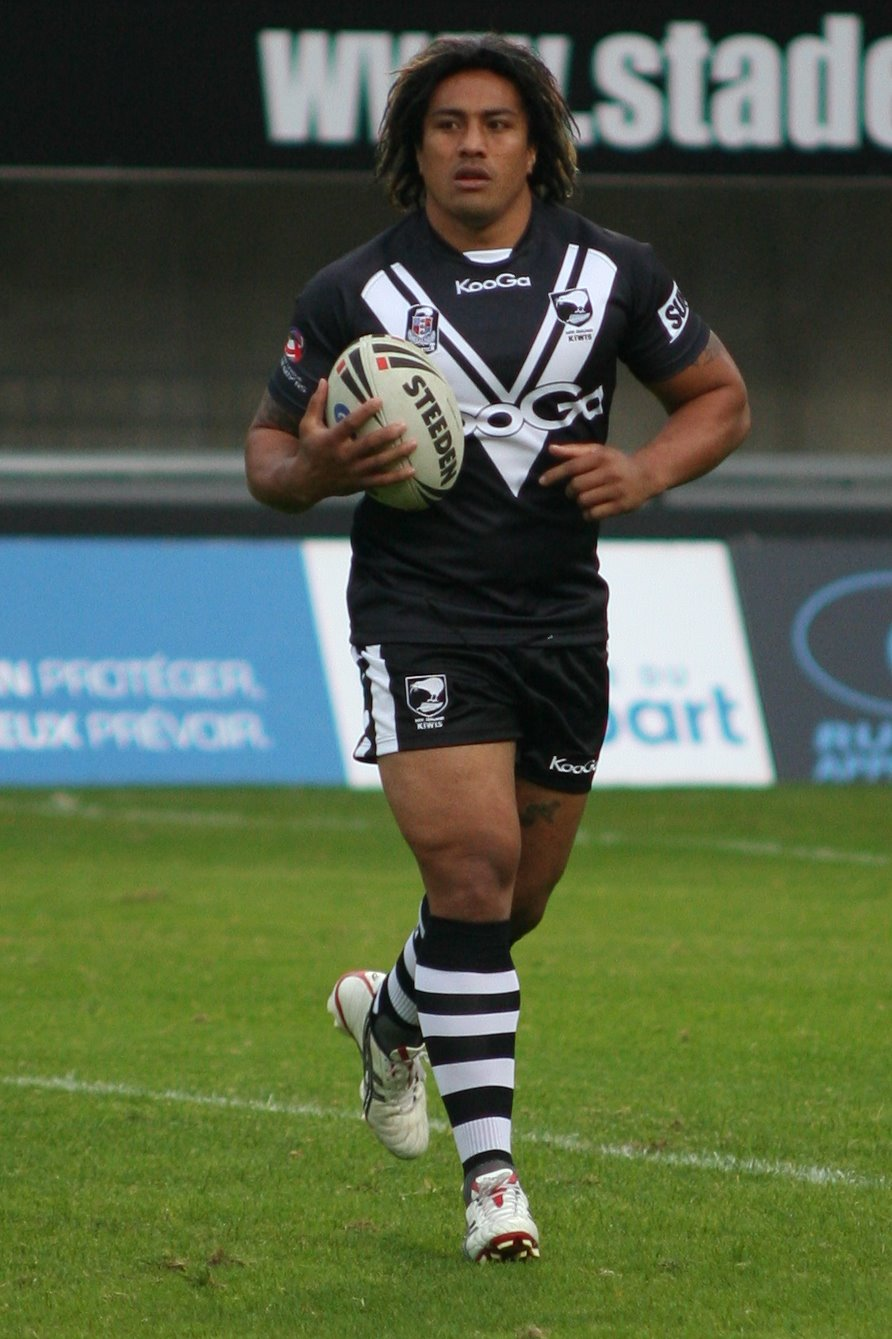
Moimoi while playing for New Zealand in 2009.

On Monday 24 September 2007, the New Zealand Rugby League association confirmed Fuifui Moimoi's inclusion into the Kiwis train-On squad to take on Australia, Great Britain and France for the end of season tests. Moimoi made his debut for New Zealand in a 58–0 defeat by Australia in Wellington on 14 October 2007. He was selected to go on the 2007 All Golds Tour.

At club level, MoiMoi made 21 appearances for Parramatta in the 2007 NRL season as the club reached another preliminary final but were defeated by Melbourne 26–10.

He was named in the New Zealand training squad for the 2008 Rugby League World Cup. He was also named in the Tonga squad. Moimoi was not selected for the final New Zealand squad, and because he had recently played for New Zealand, he was ruled ineligible for the Tongan side. He contested his right to play for Tonga in court, but to no avail.

In the 2009 NRL season, Moimoi was part of the Parramatta side which made it all the way to the grand final. In the final, Moimoi scored a memorable try in the second half where he beat five players to make it to the try line and score in the corner.

After the 2009 NRL season, Moimoi returned to the New Zealand national team, being cleared by the RLIF to play in the Four Nations.

=== 2010s ===
On 20 April 2010, Moimoi signed a further 2-year contract to continue to play with the Eels until the end of 2012. He was originally selected for New Zealand's 2010 Four Nations campaign but withdrew due to injury. Moimoi was selected play for New Zealand in the 2011 ANZAC Test from the interchange bench. At the end of the season he was selected to travel with the Kiwis to Europe for the 2011 Four Nations tournament.

In June 2012, Moimoi was reported as wishing to continue his football career until the end of the 2016 NRL season.

Moimoi was selected to play for Tonga as a prop in their 2013 Pacific Rugby League International match against fierce rivals Samoa.

Later in the year, Moimoi played for Tonga in their unsuccessful 2013 Rugby League World Cup campaign. Moimoi played in all three of Tonga's matches.

In 2014, Moimoi decided to retire from the NRL after 11 years and 201 first grade games the Eels. The club had advised Moimoi that he would not be retained for the following season.

On 30 November 2014, it was confirmed that Moimoi had signed a one-year deal with the English club Leigh Centurions with the option to extend for a further year. On Friday 20 March 2015 it was announced that Leigh Centurions had activated the option for a 2nd year.

In 2015, Moimoi spoke to the media about his time at Parramatta and how he had felt betrayed by coach Brad Arthur. Moimoi alleged a personal vendetta denied him the opportunity to play his farewell match at Pirtek Stadium. Moimoi said he worked hard to ensure he couldn't be dropped but was demoted to the Intrust Super Premiership NSW. He rebuffed an opportunity to make a mid-season switch to Manly because he wanted to play his 200th game for Parramatta. When Penrith approached him with an offer Moimoi was swayed to stay by Arthur who insisted he would return to first grade. However, he was denied the chance to farewell his supporters in the final home game of the year when he was axed again.

"It was the hardest thing I've ever been through in my career," he said. "It made me feel so angry. Brad said he had to pick the best 17, but I know I was still better than some of those players he selected." Moimoi's hurt was compounded because while many of his teammates were said to be unhappy about his treatment he only heard from Peni Terepo, Nathan Cayless and Jarryd Hayne: "Some of the boys who I thought were my good mates didn't even call me to see how I was going."

Moimoi left Leigh once the club was promoted to the Super League to join the newly founded Toronto Wolfpack in Kingstone Press League 1 and rejoined former teammates Liam Kay, Greg Worthington, Jonny Pownall, Bob Beswick, Andrew Dixon, Richard Whiting and Jacob Emmitt as well as coach Paul Rowley. On 18 January 2018, it was reported that Moimoi, along with teammates Ryan Bailey and David Taylor, parted ways with the club by "mutual agreement" following a preseason training camp in Portugal. It was later reported that the players had twice missed curfew during the trip.

Later in the month, Moimoi switched to rugby union playing for Bradford & Bingley RFC debuting for them on 30 January 2018. He joined the club through his relationship with second-team coach Richard Tafa, playing for them on a week-by-week basis until he found a rugby league club. After helping the club avoid relegation from the sixth-tier North 1 East, Moimoi made his return to rugby league on 10 April by signing with Workington Town in Betfred League 1.

=== 2020s ===
Moimoi signed for the Rochdale Hornets at the reported age of 40 and made his debut on 25 April 2021 coming off the bench in their pre-season game against the North Wales Crusaders. On 20 July 2023, Moimoi signed a contract to join amateur Cumbrian side Millom.
