= Jeremy Smith (rugby league, born 1981) =

New Zealand international rugby league footballer

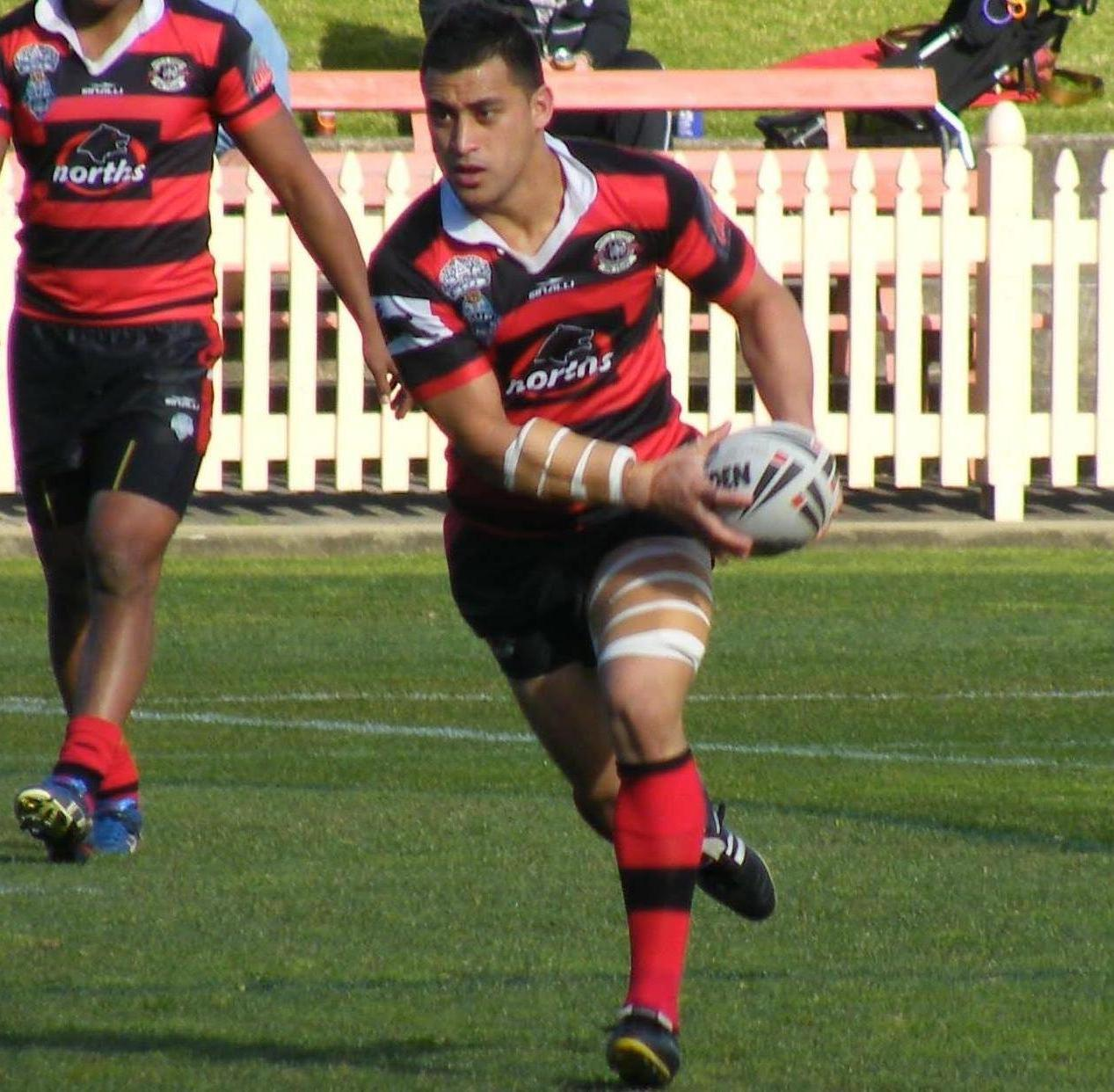

Personal information
- Full name: Jeremy James Smith
- Born: 18 July 1981 (age 45) Huntly, New Zealand

Playing information
- Height: 182 cm (6 ft 0 in)
- Weight: 90 kg (14 st 2 lb)
- Position: Five-eighth, Halfback
Club
Years	Team	Pld	T	G	FG	P
2006	Parramatta Eels	13	1	0	0	4
2007–08	South Sydney	26	4	0	0	16
2009–10	Salford City Reds	45	2	0	0	8
2011	Wakefield Trinity Wildcats	10	1	0	0	4
	Total	94	8	0	0	32
Representative
Years	Team	Pld	T	G	FG	P
2000–10	New Zealand Māori	5	1	0	0	4
2007	New Zealand	3	0	0	0	0

Jeremy James Smith (born 18 July 1981) is a New Zealand former professional rugby league footballer who previously played as a five-eighth or halfback, for the Parramatta Eels and the South Sydney Rabbitohs in the NRL, and the Salford City Reds and the Wakefield Trinity Wildcats in the Super League. Smith has represented the New Zealand Māori and New Zealand national teams at international level.

== Early life ==
Smith was born in Huntly, New Zealand, and is of Māori descent.

He began his career playing his junior rugby league for the Waiheke Rams in New Zealand.

He then moved to Australia and played for the Berala Bears in the Canterbury-Bankstown district, playing alongside future NRL players Matt Utai, Junior Langi and Andrew Emelio.

== Playing career ==
A St. George Dragons junior, Smith was selected for the Junior Kiwis in 1998, 1999, and also 2000, but pulled out in order to play for the Aotearoa Māori side in the 2000 World Cup. In 2001, he played for the Hibiscus Coast Raiders in the Bartercard Cup.

In 2005, Smith joined the Parramatta Eels, where he would spend the 2005 and 2006 seasons. In Round 13 of 2006, Smith was given a four match suspension for pushing a referee during Parramatta's bizarre 8–1 loss to St. George Illawarra. The judiciary found that Smith pushed referee Sean Hampstead in the back with both hands after a scrum was ruled against Parramatta.

Following the end of his contract at Parramatta and shortly after the announcement of Jason Taylor (Smith's coach at Parramatta) as South Sydney's coach for 2007, Smith announced that he had signed with the South Sydney Rabbitohs for 2007. Smith was a mainstay in the halves for Souths during his first year, starting all 22 of his matches at halfback. He played an instrumental structural role as a steady playmaker, helping the club secure a top-eight finish and snap an 18-year finals drought. His strong form for the Rabbitohs earned him a call-up to the New Zealand national team at the end of the year.

At the beginning of the 2009 season, Smith joined the Salford City Reds. Smith again represented the New Zealand Māori team in 2010 against England.

Ahead of the 2011 season, Smith signed a one-year deal with Super League outfit, Wakefield Trinity. Due to off-season injuries and visa problems, Smith was unable to take part in any friendlies, meaning that he had limited match fitness when he made his début in Round 3 against Salford. He returned to Australia in 2012, signing with the St. George Illawarra Dragons and playing in the NSW Cup for the Illawarra Cutters.
