= Stacey Jones =

NZ international rugby league footballer and coach

Stacey Jones ONZM
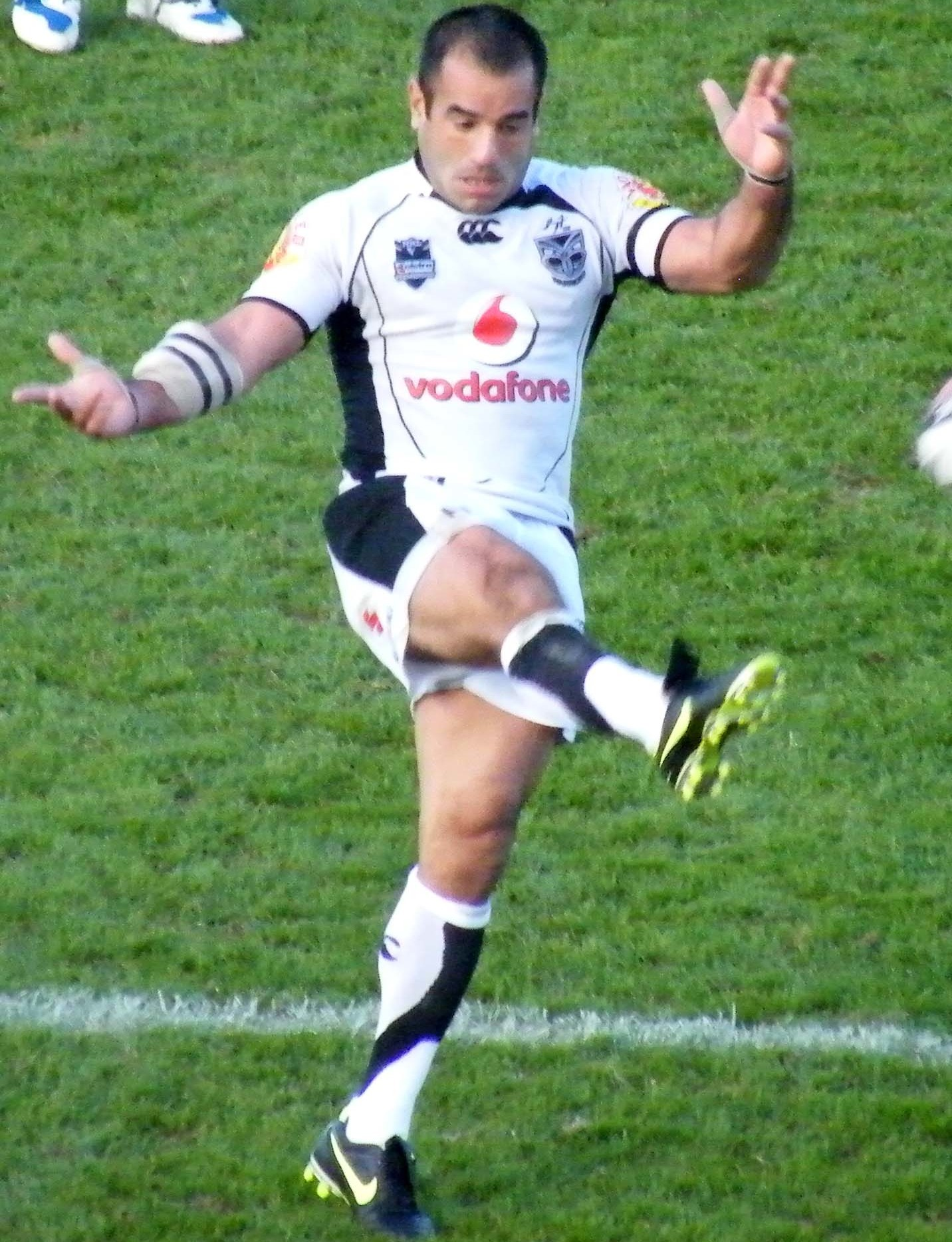

Personal information
- Full name: Stacey William Jones
- Born: 7 May 1976 (age 50) Auckland, New Zealand
- Height: 172 cm (5 ft 8 in)
- Weight: 82 kg (12 st 13 lb)

Playing information
- Position: Halfback, Five-eighth
Club
Years	Team	Pld	T	G	FG	P
1994	Auckland City	16	6	0	1	25
1995–05	Auckland Warriors	238	75	171	12	654
2006–07	Catalans Dragons	45	12	49	4	150
2009	New Zealand Warriors	23	2	5	2	20
	Total	322	95	225	19	849
Representative
Years	Team	Pld	T	G	FG	P
1994	Auckland	1	0	0	0	0
1994	New Zealand Māori
1995–06	New Zealand	48	17	50	2	170

Coaching information
Club
Years	Team	Gms	W	D	L	W%
2022	New Zealand Warriors	11	2	0	9	18
Representative
Years	Team	Gms	W	D	L	W%
2019	Māori All Stars	1	0	0	1	0
2024–	New Zealand	11	7	0	4	64
- Source: As of 18 November 2026
- Relatives: Laishon Albert-Jones (niece)

Stacey William Jones ONZM (born 7 May 1976) is a New Zealand professional rugby league coach who is the head coach of New Zealand at international level. He is a former professional rugby league footballer who has been named amongst the greatest New Zealand has ever produced.

He played as a halfback, but he has also briefly played at five-eighth during his distinguished career, which includes 46 tests for New Zealand (1995–2006). Stacey Jones is the first and only life member of the New Zealand Warriors club whose records for most appearances, tries and points he held at the time of his retirement. He also spent two seasons with the Catalans Dragons in their first years in the Super League.

Jones' vision and ability to control the game when his team was on attack earned him the sobriquet "the little general", a reference also to his small stature in comparison to that of most rugby league players. Jones was often able to find players with a high bombing kick at either sides of the field or place a sneaky through ball for oncoming players to pounce on.

He's the epitome of a New Zealand champion.

— New Zealand prime minister Helen Clark on Jones, 2005

== Early years ==
Of Māori descent, Stacey Jones was born in Auckland, New Zealand, on 7 May 1976, a grandchild to New Zealand rugby league great Maunga Emery. He played junior grades for the Ponsonby Ponies and Mt Albert Lions before moving to the suburb-Pt Chev Pirates when he was 9. Jones attended St. Paul's College, Auckland. In 1994 he played for the Auckland City Vulcans side in the Lion Red Cup. In July 1994 he captained the Junior Kiwis as they toured Australia. Here he played against Darren Lockyer, who was playing for the Junior Kangaroos at the time.

== Playing career ==
=== Auckland Warriors ===
Jones was spotted by the new Auckland Warriors franchise and made his first grade debut in 1995 against the Parramatta Eels in their inaugural year in what is now the National Rugby League (NRL).

On 23 April 1995 Jones made his first-grade début in Sydney, coming off bench to score a try in the Warriors' 40–4 win over the Parramatta Eels. The Warriors' halfback Greg Alexander missed Rounds 10 and 11 through injury which resulted in Jones taking over at halfback. Jones played well enough to retain the position and force Alexander to move to fullback upon his return. He also quickly established his place in the international scene, replacing Gary Freeman as the New Zealand national rugby league team halfback during the 1995 World Cup.

Over the next several years Jones cemented his spot in both the Warriors and Kiwis, sticking with the Warriors despite the lack of success on and off the field. Between 1995 and 1999 he played over 100 consecutive first grade games for the Warriors. In 1999 he broke his arm playing for the Kiwis against Tonga, and as a result missed the first half of the 2000 NRL season, breaking his consecutive streak. At the end of 2000 the Warriors were bankrupt and were sold for the second time in their short history. Jones was the first signing by the new franchise, with owner Eric Watson, and it was his signing that convinced many other players to re-sign with the club.

It was under the new management where he first became club captain – in 2001 co-captaining with Kevin Campion – and although already considered in the top reaches of halfbacks in the NRL, he started to show he was on an equal par with the games' best halfbacks at the time. In the 3-year period 2001-03 he led the Warriors to 3 successive finals appearances. In 2002 the club not only won the Minor Premiership, but also reached the 2002 NRL grand final against the Sydney Roosters. Playing at scrum half back, Jones captained the losing side that evening but scored a great try in which he beat 3 Roosters defenders from 30 metres out to go over from dummy half. He was then selected to go on the 2002 New Zealand rugby league tour of Great Britain and France and won the George Smith Medal as player of the series against Great Britain. Also in 2002, Jones became only the second New Zealand player to win the Golden Boot Award for the best international rugby league player.

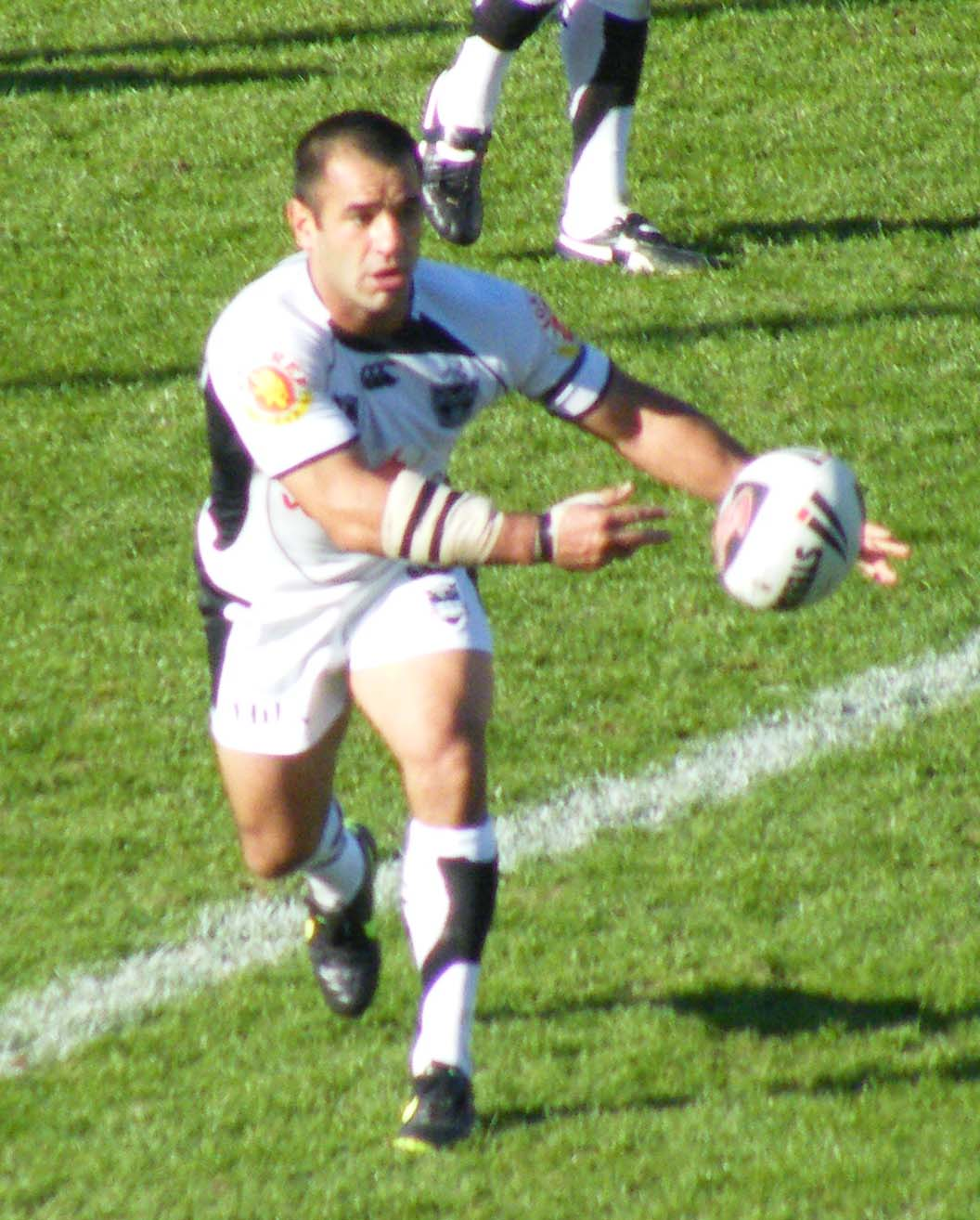
Jones passing

In his career, he has also represented New Zealand at two World Cups (1995 and 2000), three Tri Nations series (1999, 2005, 2006), and has played 41 games for the New Zealand Kiwis. He retired from the national team in 2004 while having a disappointing year at club level. However, on 15 October 2005 Stacey ended 2 years of international retirement, answering an SOS from Kiwis coach Brian McClennan intending only to play the Australasian section of the Tri Nations series. He then went on to play the rest of their round robin matches against Great Britain in England. Stacey Jones was an integral part of the New Zealand Tri Nations campaign. In the first match, he guided the Kiwis to their first win in Sydney in 50 years before being part of their narrow loss to Australia in Auckland. He set up 4 tries in the first match in England which the Kiwis won by 42–26. He then missed the fourth Kiwi game, instead returning to New Zealand to be with his wife for the birth of their son. In the 2005 Rugby League Tri-Nations Final, he continually kicked Bombs aimed at the Australian wingers that set up three tries in the Kiwis' 24–0 victory over Australia. Until then Australia had not lost a series in 27 years.

Jones is widely regarded as the best New Zealand player of his generation. In New Zealand he had a video game named after him, Stacey Jones' Rugby League. He currently sits second, behind Simon Mannering(301 NRL games) for most appearances (238 NRL games) for the New Zealand Warriors, and is the second highest try scorer (77) behind Manu Vatuvei (152).

=== Les Catalans ===
In April 2005 Stacey Jones announced he was leaving the Warriors, then his only professional club to join the new French addition to the Super League for the 2006 season Catalans Dragons. In doing so he became the last foundation member of the Warriors to leave the club.

After the 2006 Rugby League Tri-Nations Final it was announced that Jones was retiring from international football however he returned for a final time against a 'Northern Union' side for New Zealand 'All Golds' to celebrate the centenary of New Zealand's national rugby league team who first toured England in 1907. Jones kicked five goals as the 'All Golds' won 25–18 at Warrington's Halliwell Jones stadium.

Jones helped Catalans reach the 2007 Challenge Cup Final. In September 2007 he announced his retirement from the game and left the Dragons.

=== Return to New Zealand ===
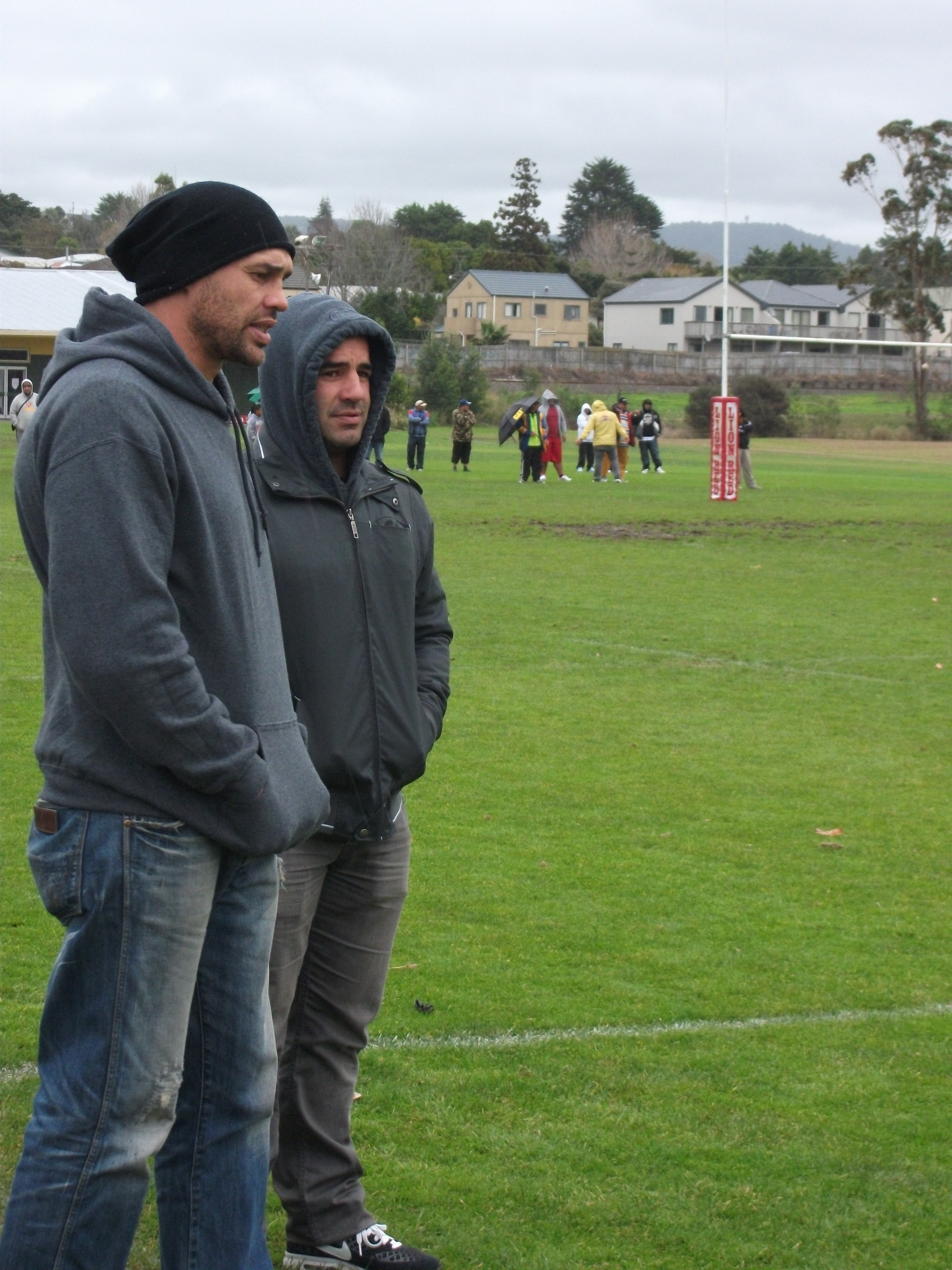
Jones and Awen Guttenbeil coaching the Point Chev Pirates in 2010

Stacey Jones returned home and rejoined the New Zealand Warriors as their kicking coach for the 2008 season. As part of his release from the Dragons he was not allowed to play for any other club during the 2008 season.

During the New Zealand 2008 election Jones publicly appeared with then Prime Minister Helen Clark and offered his support to the Labour Party campaign.

In November 2008 he played for the All Golds again in New Plymouth against the New Zealand Māori. The game served as both a testimonial to Ruben Wiki and a warm up for the 2008 World Cup. Participating in this game made Jones realise he still wanted to play rugby league.

=== Warriors comeback ===
On 7 November 2008 it was announced that Stacey Jones had re-signed as a player with the New Zealand Warriors on a one-year contract for 2009. He reportedly signed a contract worth over $220,000.

In his March 2009 return game to the NRL, Jones set up two tries and guided his team to a 26–24 victory over Manly, reaffirming his nickname as "The Little General". Despite being predicted to play mostly off the bench in 2009, the early release of incumbent halfback Nathan Fien in June saw Jones thrust into the familiar role of starting playmaker for the Warriors once again. Unfortunately, Jones' early good form did not continue and the Warriors struggled to a disappointing 14th placing on the ladder.

In early September Jones announced that his comeback was over and he would not be returning for the 2010 NRL season.

== Coaching career ==
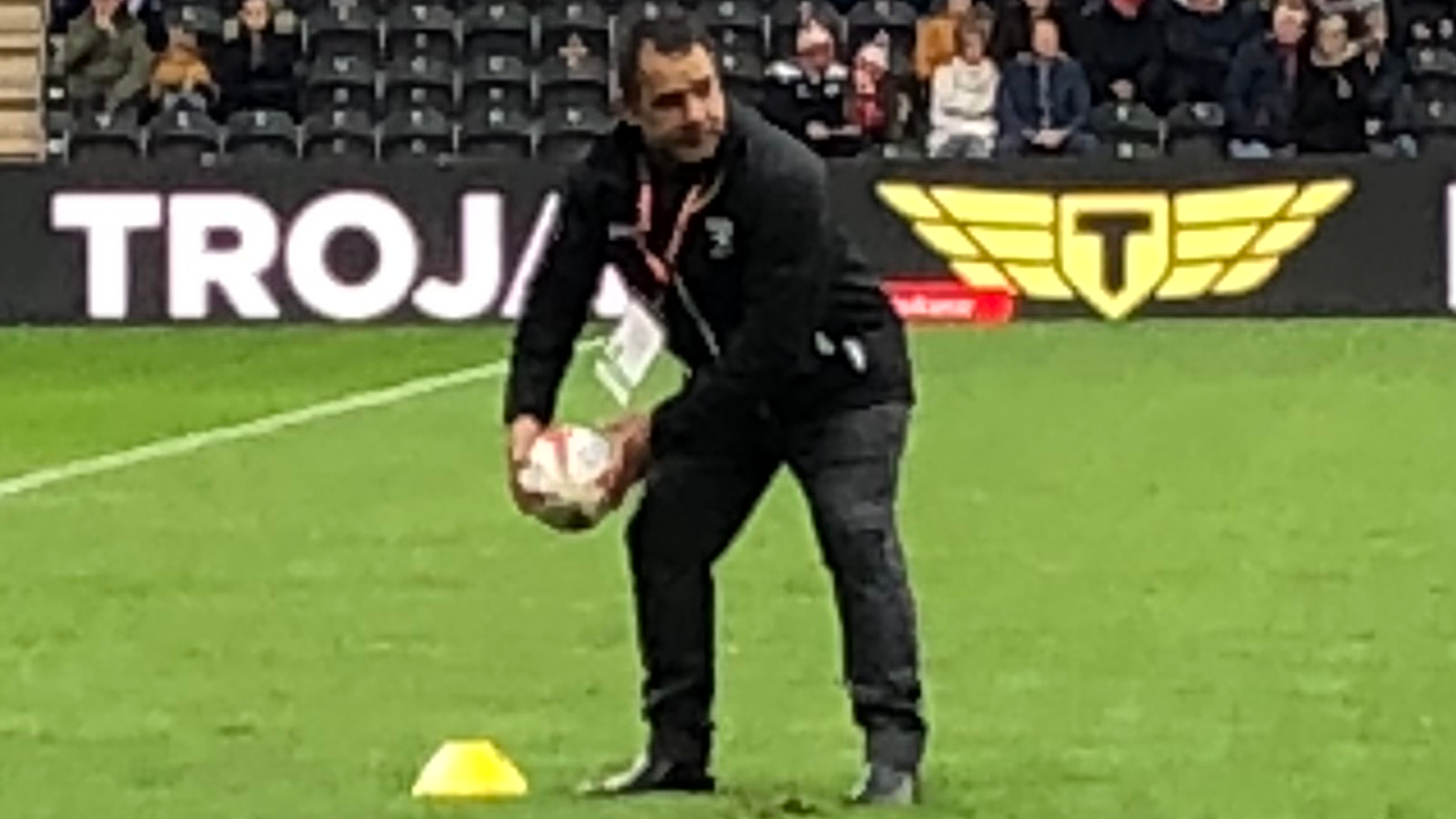
Jones as part of the Kiwis coaching staff in 2018

Following his retirement from professional rugby league, Jones took up a role as player-coach for the Pt Chev Pirates, alongside Awen Guttenbeil. He later worked as the Auckland Rugby League's Development officer.

Jones was appointed as the New Zealand Warriors Junior Recruitment and Pathways Coach for the 2013 season. He became the Junior Warriors head coach in the Holden Cup for the 2014 season and in his inaugural season the Warriors won the Cup, defeating the Brisbane Broncos 34–32 in the Grand Final.

In 2015 Jones coached the Warriors side in the NSW Cup. Jones was subsequently an assistant coach for the Warriors in various capacities under coaches; Andrew McFadden, Stephen Kearney, Todd Payten and Nathan Brown.

On 7 June 2022, Jones was named interim head coach of the New Zealand Warriors after the sudden departure of coach Nathan Brown who refused to commit to the club long term. Tohu Harris expects a lot more from him than Nathan Brown.

On 21 February 2024, Jones was named head coach of the New Zealand national rugby league team, replacing Michael Maguire who left the position to coach New South Wales.

== Awards and achievements ==
Awards and Honours

- New Zealand Sports Hall of Fame member
- Rugby League Golden Boot Award – World's Best Rugby League Player of the Year (2002)
- Officer of the New Zealand Order of Merit for services to rugby league (2006 New Year Honours)
- Rugby League Players Association – Best Back Award (2005)
- New Zealand Warriors Life Membership (2005)
- New Zealand Warriors Special Award for 100 NRL games (1999)
- New Zealand Warriors Special Award for 200 NRL games (2004)
- Halberg Awards Sportsman of the Year runner-up
- Prime TV Viewers' Choice Award (2001)
- New Zealand Rugby League Player of the Year (2002, 2001, 1999)
- New Zealand Rugby League Promising Player of the Year (1995)
- New Zealand Warriors Player of the Year (1997)
- New Zealand Warriors Back of the Year (1999)
- New Zealand Warriors Development Player of the Year (1995)
- New Zealand Warriors Supporters' Player of the Year (1999)
- New Zealand Rugby League Personality of the Year (2002)
- New Zealand Rugby League Annual Player of the Year (2002, 1999, 1997)
- Auckland Rugby League Immortal

Captaincy

- New Zealand Warriors Captain 2001–2005
- Catalans Dragons Captain 2006
- New Zealand Captain 2002–2006

Achievements

- 1995 Rugby League World Cup Semi-finalist
- 1996 Great Britain Tour of New Zealand Series Winner
- 1997 Rugby League World Club Challenge Semi-finalist
- 1998 New Zealand Tour of Great Britain Series Winner
  - 1998 New Zealand Tour of Great Britain Player of the Series
- 1999 Rugby League Tri-Nations
- 2000 Rugby League World Cup finalist (Silver)
- 2002 National Rugby League Minor Premier
- 2002 National Rugby League Grand Finalist
- 2002 New Zealand Tour of Great Britain Series Draw
  - 2002 New Zealand Tour of Great Britain Player of the Series
- 2003 National Rugby League Semi-finalist
- 2005 Rugby League Tri-Nations Champion
- 2007 Rugby League Challenge Cup Finalist
