= List of Bradford Bulls players =

The following is a list of rugby league players who have appeared for Bradford Bulls.

== Former Super League Players ==
- (England) Paul Anderson
- (England) Ryan Atkins
- (England) Michael Banks
- (Papua New Guinea) Marcus Bai
- (England) Chris Birchall
- (Australia) Graeme Bradley
- (Republic of Ireland) Chris Bridge
- (Australia) Justin Brooker
- (Australia) David Boyle
- (England) Sam Burgess
- (England) Matt Calland
- (England) Gary Christie
- (England) Richard Colley
- (England) Paul Cook
- (England) Matt Cook
- (Australia) Brandon Costin
- (England) Kevin Crouthers
- (England) Paul Deacon
- (England) Jason Donahue
- (Australia) Jeremy Donougher
- (Republic of Ireland) Bernard Dwyer
- (England) Shaun Edwards
- (England) Abi Ekoku
- (England) Karl Fairbank
- (England) Brett Ferres
- (England) Stuart Fielden
- (England) Mike Forshaw
- (Australia) Daniel Gartner
- (Papua New Guinea) Stanley Gene
- (Scotland) Lee Gilmour
- (Scotland) Nathan Graham
- (England) Jon Hamer
- (England) Gareth Handford
- (Republic of Ireland) Neil Harmon
- (New Zealand) Shontayne Hape
- (Australia) Ben Harris
- (Tonga) Carlos Hassan
- (Scotland) Richard Hawkyard
- (Scotland) Ian Henderson
- (England) Tommy Hodgkinson
- (England) Andy Hodgson
- (England) Harvey Howard
- (Samoa) Phil Howlett
- (England) Matt James
- (Australia) Ben Jeffries
- (England) Paul Johnson
- (England) Warren Jowitt
- (Scotland) Simon Knox
- (New Zealand) Toa Kohe-Love
- (England) Davide Longo
- (England) Paul Loughlin
- (Republic of Ireland) James Lowes
- (Australia) Brad Mackay
- (Scotland) Graham Mackay
- (England) Nathan McAvoy
- (England) Brian McDermott
- (England) Craig McDowell
- (Australia) Chris McKenna
- (England) Steve McNamara
- (England) Paul Medley
- (Australia) Brad Meyers
- (England) Richard Moore
- (Australia) Glen Morrison
- (England) Adrian Morley
- (England) Scott Naylor
- (England) Terry Newton
- (England) Sonny Nickle
- (England) Rob Parker
- (New Zealand) Henry Paul
- (New Zealand) Robbie Paul
- (Australia) Danny Peacock
- (England) Jamie Peacock
- (England) Karl Pratt
- (England) Leon Pryce
- (England) Karl Pryce
- (England) Lee Radford
- (England) Stuart Reardon
- (New Zealand) Tahi Reihana
- (Australia) Shane Rigon
- (England) Jon Scales
- (England) Roger Simpson
- (England) Aaron Smith
- (England) Andy Smith
- (Australia) Hudson Smith
- (New Zealand) David Solomona
- (England) Stuart Spruce
- (England) Gareth Stanley
- (England) Marcus St Hilaire
- (New Zealand) Logan Swann
- (Tonga) Semi Tadulala
- (Australia) Glen Tomlinson
- (New Zealand) Tame Tupou
- (New Zealand) Lesley Vainikolo
- (Tonga) Tevita Vaikona
- (New Zealand) Joe Vagana
- (England) Alex Wilkinson
- (Republic of Ireland) Michael Withers
- (Australia) Jeff Wittenberg
- (Italy) Nick Zisti
- (England) Carl Winterburn

== Former Bradford Northern players ==
- Dave Barends – WG
- Eric Batten – WG
- Mick Blacker – PR
- Stan Brogden – CE
- Ian Brooke – CE
- Brian Butler – PR
- George Carmichael – FB
- Trevor Clark – HK
- Dean Carroll – PR
- Des Case – WG
- Len Casey – PR
- Gerald Cordle – WG
- Vic Darlison – HK
- Malcolm Davies – PR
- Willie Davies – FE
- Bak Diabira – PR
- Paul Dixon – SR
- Enslin Dlambulo – PR
- Peter Dunn – PR
- David Dyson – HK
- Kel Earl – PR
- Steve Evans – CE
- Karl Fairbank – PR
- Stan Fearnley – LK
- Tony Fisher – HK
- Phil Ford – WG
- Colin Forsyth – PR
- Frank Foster – LK
- Trevor Foster – SR
- Deryck Fox – HB
- Neil Fox – CE
- Richard Francis – WG
- Les Gant – PR
- Henderson Gill – WG
- Heath Godfrey – PR
- Jeff Grayshon – SR
- Bob Haigh – SR
- Len Haley – PR
- Jon Hamer – PR
- Ellery Hanley – LK
- Paul Harkin – HB
- Dave Heron – LK
- Brendan Hill – PR
- Dave Hill – FE
- David Hobbs – PR
- Terry Holmes – HB
- Graham Idle – LF
- Brett Iti – HB
- Francis Jarvis – HK
- Graham Joyce – PR
- Milan Kosanović – HK
- Jack Kitching – CE
- Mike Lamb – PR
- Bill Leake – PR
- Arnie Long – PR (Dewsbury early 1980s)
- Ash Lumby – PR
- Joe Mageen – PR
- Tony Marchant – WG
- Steve McGowan – CE
- Jack McLean – WG
- Brian McDermott – PR
- Paul Medley – SR
- Edward Melling – SH
- Darren Moxon – FB
- Keith Mumby – FB
- Tom Murray – PR
- Paul Newlove – CE
- Brian Noble – HK
- Robbie Paul – HB
- John Pendlebury – LK
- Joe Phillips – PR
- Roy Powell – SR
- Terry Price – FB
- Johnny Rae – LK
- Philip Ralda – PR
- Basil Rathbone – PR
- Craig Richards – PR
- Alan Redfearn – HB
- Dave Redfearn – WG
- Peter Roe – CE
- James "Jimmy" Russell – FB
- Barry Seabourne – HB
- Martin Savage – SR
- Jack Scroby – PR
- Darrall Shelford – CE
- Kelvin Skerrett – PR
- Ian Slater – PR
- Tommy Smales – HB
- Billy Smith – CE
- Ted Spilane – PR
- Nigel Stephenson – CE
- Russell Stewart – FB
- Dave Stockwell – PR
- Neil Summers – HB
- Eddie Tees – PR
- Jimmy Thompson – PR
- Ken Traill – LK
- Gary Van Bellen – WG
- Ian Van Bellen – CE
- Donald Ward – SH
- Ernest Ward – CE
- Dave Watson – SO
- Bernard Watson – PR
- Frank Whitcombe – PR
- Tom Winnard – PR
- Joe Winterburn – PR
- John Woods – CE
- Johnny Wolford – PR
- Harold Young – LK

== Team of Century ==
Bradford Bulls Team Of The Century

(England) 8 Stuart Fielden	(Republic of Ireland) 9 James Lowes	(New Zealand) 10 Joe Vagana
(Wales) 11 Trevor Foster	(England) 12 Karl Fairbank
(England) 13Ellery Hanley
(England) 7 Paul Deacon
(New Zealand) 6 Robbie Paul
(New Zealand) 4Shontayne Hape
(England) 3Ernest Ward
(New Zealand) 5 Lesley Vainikolo	(New Zealand) 2Jack McLean
(England) 1 Keith Mumby

Head coach

- 00 (England) Brian Noble

Kit man

- 00 (England) Fred Robinson

== Players Receiving Testimonial matches ==
- Ronald "Ron" Barritt (Testimonial match 1989)
- Michael "Mick" Blacker (Testimonial match 1977)
- Paul Deacon (Testimonial match 2008)
- Jon Hamer (Testimonial match 1994)
- Brian McDermott (Testimonial match 2002)
- Steve McGowan (Testimonial match 1993)
- Keith Mumby (Testimonial match 1985)
- Brian Noble (Testimonial match 1988)
- Robbie Paul (Testimonial match 2006)
- Alan Redfearn (Testimonial match 1983)
- David Redfearn (Testimonial match 1981)
- Dennis Trotter (Testimonial match 1981
- Ernest Ward (Testimonial match 1950)
- Frank Whitcombe(Testimonial match 1948)

== Players earning International Caps while at Bradford ==
For players earning International Caps while at Bradford, see Bradford Bulls internationals.
