= 1997 Bradford Bulls season =

Rugby league club season

- Super League II Rank: 1st – Champions
- Challenge Cup: Runners Up
- 1997 record: Wins: 24; draws: 0; losses: 10
- Points scored: For: 1095; against: 788

Team information
- Chairman: Chris Caisley
- Head Coach: Matthew Elliot
- Captain: Robbie Paul
- Stadium: Odsal Stadium
- Avg. attendance: 14,327
- High attendance: 18,387 vs. St. Helens

Top scorers
- Tries: James Lowes (17)
- Goals: Steve McNamara (133)
- Points: Steve McNamara (299)
← 1996	List of seasons	1998 →

This article details the Bradford Bulls rugby league football club's 1997 season, the 2nd season of the Super League era.

== Season review ==
February 1997

Bradford started off their 1997 season with an emphatic 62–10 win over Hunslet Hawks in the 4th Round of the Challenge Cup. The Bulls continued their Challenge Cup run with a 34–12 win against London Broncos.

March 1997

The Bulls progressed through to the Challenge Cup semi-final with a 38–12 win in the quarter-final against Oldham Bears. Bradford kicked off their Super League II campaign with a 58–12 win against Warrington Wolves. Bradford once again reached the Challenge Cup Final for the 2nd year in a row and similar to last year they beat arch rivals Leeds Rhinos to get there; in a tight game the Bulls were 24–10 victors.

April 1997

April started off with a 38–12 win against Castleford Tigers keeping the Bulls at the top of the table. A last minute drop goal from Steve McNamara ensure that the Bulls beat London Broncos 19–14. Bradford then travelled to Central Park to play the Premiership Champions Wigan Warriors, a game which Paul Cook's 100% goal kicking ensure the Bulls stayed top of the table with a 22–18 win. Bradford continued their unbeaten run with a 30–18 win in Paris. The Bulls unbeaten run was nearly broken with a spirited display from Halifax Blue Sox however Bradford managed to hang onto a 28–26 lead to win the match. Bradford finished April off by hammering Sheffield Eagles 54–10.

May 1997

The Bulls were beaten in the Challenge Cup Final by St. Helens for the 2nd time in 2 years as they succumbed to a 32–22 defeat, this also marked the Bulls 1st loss of the season. Bradford didn't have to wait long for another crack at the Saints as they play at the home of the Bulls the week after the cup final however this time it was Bradford who took the points in revenge of the final defeat by beating the Saints 38–18. The Bulls continued their unbeaten streak in the league with two more wins in May, the first being a 38–14 victory against Warrington Wolves and the second being a 42–28 decimation of Oldham Bears. The final game in May saw the Bulls take on Halifax Blue Sox at Thrum Hall, Bradford found themselves behind 26–6 before going on to win 30–26 making it one of the best comebacks in the Super League era.

June 1997

Next up for the Bulls were the newest team in the Super League, the Salford City Reds. Salford put up a good battle but were no match for the Challenge Cup runners up who won 40–24. Bradford continued their unbeaten league start at rivals Leeds Rhinos in front of a 19,137 crowd, they beat the Rhinos 32–16 and increased their lead at the top of the table. In June the Bulls also participated in the World Club Challenge tournament, first up was the visit of Penrith Panthers, Bradford got off to a great start leading 16–6 at halftime but the Panthers came back to clinch the game 20–16. Bradford also lost their next two WCC games, a 20–16 loss to Auckland Warriors and a 30–10 loss to Cronulla Sharks.

July 1997

July started off with a hard fought 34–20 win against Castleford Tigers to keep their unbeaten league run intact. The Bulls made it 16 wins out of 16 games with a 38–20 effort against Challenge Cup winners St. Helens. Bradford once again beat newcomers Salford City Reds 34–14 to stay top of the league. The WCC got even worse for the Bulls as they lost 64–14 to Auckland Warriors in the return fixture and also lost 54–14 to Penrith Panthers.

August 1997

Bradford faced off against arch-rivals Leeds Rhinos at Odsal in a game which the Bulls were victors beating Leeds 22–8. The month got better as they dispatched Sheffield Eagles 32–12 and Paris Saint-Germain 68–0 which took their winning streak in the league to 20 games. This unbeaten run ended in Round 21 when Wigan Warriors comfortably beat Bradford 33–18, then the week after the Bulls lost 28–24 against 2nd placed London Broncos. These results however did not affect the Bulls' finishing positions and they finished top of the table becoming the champions of Super League II. The Bulls played their final group game in the WCC losing 40–12 against Cronulla Sharks.

September 1997

The Bulls finished off the 1997 English season with a 25–12 loss to Castleford Tigers in the Premiership Trophy Quarter-final loss.

October 1997

Bradford had one more game of the season. The quarter final of the World Club Challenge against Auckland Warriors. The Bulls were only losing 20–16 at halftime but a great second half from Auckland blew Bradford away and the Bulls lost 62–14. The entire tournament was branded as a poor showing as no British teams qualified for the semi-finals.

== 1997 milestones ==
- CCR4: Danny Peacock and Warren Jowitt scored their 1st tries for the Bulls.
- CCQF: Steve McNamara reached 200 points and kicked his 100th goal for the Bulls.
- CCQF: Robbie Paul scored his 25th try and reached 100 points for the Bulls.
- Round 1: Robbie Paul scored his 4th hat-trick for the Bulls.
- Round 3: Simon Knox scored his 1st hat-trick for the Bulls.
- Round 8: Paul Anderson and Abi Ekoku scored their 1st tries for the Bulls.
- Round 9: Mike Forshaw scored his 1st try for the Bulls.
- Round 11: Jeff Wittenberg scored his 1st try for the Bulls.
- Round 14: Nathan Graham and Andy Hodgson scored their 1st tries for the Bulls.
- Round 15: Jon Scales scored his 25th try and reached 100 points for the Bulls.
- Round 17: Steve McNamara reached 400 points for the Bulls.
- Round 17: Paul Loughlin reached 100 points for the Bulls.
- Round 20: James Lowes scored his 25th try and reached 100 points for the Bulls.
- Round 20: Danny Peacock scored his 1st hat-trick for the Bulls.
- Round 20: Kevin Crouthers scored his 1st try for the Bulls.
- Round 22: Steve McNamara kicked his 200th goal for the Bulls.
- WCC Game 3: Paul Loughlin scored his 25th try for the Bulls.
- WCC Game 5: Andy Hodgson kicked his 1st goal for the Bulls.
- WCC Game 6: Graeme Bradley scored his 25th try and reached 100 points for the Bulls.

== Table ==
Pos	Team	Pld	W	D	L	PF	PA	PD	Pts	Relegation
1	Bradford Bulls (C)	22	20	0	2	769	397	+372	40	
2	London Broncos	22	15	3	4	616	418	+198	33	
3	St Helens	22	14	1	7	592	506	+86	29	
4	Wigan	22	14	0	8	683	398	+285	28	
5	Leeds Rhinos	22	13	1	8	544	463	+81	27	
6	Salford Reds	22	11	0	11	428	495	−67	22	
7	Halifax Blue Sox	22	8	2	12	524	549	−25	18	
8	Sheffield Eagles	22	9	0	13	415	574	−159	18	
9	Warrington Wolves	22	8	0	14	437	647	−210	16	
10	Castleford Tigers	22	5	2	15	334	515	−181	12	
11	Paris Saint-Germain	22	6	0	16	362	572	−210	12	
12	Oldham Bears (R)	22	4	1	17	461	631	−170	9	Relegated to Division One

Source: Rugby League Project
Rules for classification: 1) Points; 2) Points difference; 3) Number of points scored;
(C) Champions; (R) Relegated

== 1997 fixtures and results ==
LEGEND
Win
Draw
Loss

1997 Stones Bitter Super League

Date	Competition	Rnd	Vrs	H/A	Venue	Result	Score	Tries	Goals	Att
14 March 1997	Super League II	1	Warrington Wolves	H	Odsal Stadium	W	58–20	Paul (3), Spruce (2), Lowes, McDermott, McNamara, Peacock, Scales	McNamara 9/10	15,070
21 March 1997	Super League II	2	Oldham Bears	A	Boundary Park	W	30–18	Bradley, Jowitt, McNamara, Nickle, Spruce	McNamara 4/4, Cook 1/1	5,604
1 April 1997	Super League II	4	Castleford Tigers	A	The Jungle	W	38–12	Paul (2), Jowitt, Loughlin, Lowes, McDermott	McNamara 3/3, Cook 4/4	7,882
6 April 1997	Super League II	5	London Broncos	H	Odsal Stadium	W	19–14	Cook, Loughlin, Nickle	McNamara 3/3, McNamara 1 DG	15,556
11 April 1997	Super League II	6	Wigan Warriors	A	Central Park	W	22–18	Peacock (2), Calland	Cook 5/5	10,710
18 April 1997	Super League II	7	Paris Saint-Germain	A	Stade Sébastien Charléty	W	30–18	Cook (2), Paul (2), Lowes	McNamara 4/4, Cook 1/1	9,745
23 April 1997	Super League II	3	Halifax Blue Sox	H	Odsal Stadium	W	28–26	Knox (3), Calland, McNamara	McNamara 4/5	13,285
27 April 1997	Super League II	8	Sheffield Eagles	H	Odsal Stadium	W	54–10	Anderson (2), Bradley (2), Ekoku (2), McDermott, McNamara, Nickle, Peacock	McNamara 7/10	14,384
11 May 1997	Super League II	9	St. Helens	H	Odsal Stadium	W	38–18	Forshaw (2), Dwyer, Knox, Loughlin, McNamara	McNamara 7/7	18,387
18 May 1997	Super League II	10	Warrington Wolves	A	Wilderspool Stadium	W	38–14	Tomlinson (2), Anderson, Calland, Forshaw, Lowes, Peacock	McNamara 5/7	7,043
23 May 1997	Super League II	11	Oldham Bears	H	Odsal Stadium	W	42–28	Ekoku (2), Scales (2), Tomlinson (2), Spruce, Wittenberg	McNamara 5/8	13,262
27 May 1997	Super League II	12	Halifax Blue Sox	A	Thrum Hall	W	30–26	Spruce (2), Knox, Loughlin, McDermott, Scales	Loughlin 2/4, McNamara 1/2	6,252
1 June 1997	Super League II	13	Salford City Reds	A	The Willows	W	40–24	Bradley (2), Calland, Forshaw, Lowes, Tomlinson, Wittenberg	McNamara 6/7	8,241
29 June 1997	Super League II	14	Leeds Rhinos	A	Headingley Stadium	W	32–16	Bradley, Graham, Hodgson, McNamara, Nickle	McNamara 6/6	19,137
2 July 1997	Super League II	15	Castleford Tigers	H	Odsal Stadium	W	34–20	Scales (2), Tomlinson (2), Graham, McNamara	McNamara 5/6	11,873
6 July 1997	Super League II	16	St. Helens	A	Knowsley Road	W	38–20	Calland (2), Lowes (2), Bradley, Hodgson, Peacock	McNamara 5/7	10,277
11 July 1997	Super League II	17	Salford City Reds	H	Odsal Stadium	W	34–14	Calland, Dwyer, Graham, Hodgson, Lowes, McDermott	Loughlin 3/4, McNamara 2/2	14,095
10 August 1997	Super League II	18	Leeds Rhinos	H	Odsal Stadium	W	22–8	Paul (2), Lowes, Scales	McNamara 3/4	16,542
16 August 1997	Super League II	19	Sheffield Eagles	A	Don Valley Stadium	W	32–12	Dwyer, Forshaw, Lowes, Peacock, Wittenberg	McNamara 6/6	10,603
22 August 1997	Super League II	20	Paris Saint-Germain	H	Odsal Stadium	W	68–0	Peacock (3), Lowes (2), Medley (2), Christie, Crouthers, Hodgson, Loughlin, Spruce, Tomlinson, Wittenberg	McNamara 6/14	17,128
25 August 1997	Super League II	21	Wigan Warriors	H	Odsal Stadium	L	18–33	Dwyer, Lowes, Scales	McNamara 3/3	16,761
31 August 1997	Super League II	22	London Broncos	A	The Stoop	L	24–28	Bradley, Dwyer, Loughlin, Spruce	McNamara 4/4	9,166
14 September 1997	Premiership	QF	Castleford Tigers	H	Odsal Stadium	L	12–25	Lowes, Forshaw	Loughlin 1/1, McNamara 1/1	10,300

== Challenge Cup ==
LEGEND
Win
Draw
Loss

Date	Competition	Rnd	Vrs	H/A	Venue	Result	Score	Tries	Goals	Att
9 February 1997	Cup	4th	Hunslet Hawks	N	Elland Road	W	62–10	Donougher (2), Loughlin (2), Peacock (2), Cook, Jowitt, McDermott, Nickle, Scales	McNamara 6/8, Cook 3/3	6,102
22 February 1997	Cup	5th	London Broncos	A	The Stoop	W	34–12	Nickle (2), Cook, Loughlin, Paul, Tomlinson	McNamara 5/6	6,102
9 March 1997	Cup	QF	Oldham Bears	A	Boundary Park	W	38–12	Tomlinson (2), Loughlin, Paul, Peacock, Spruce	McNamara 7/7	11,284
29 March 1997	Cup	SF	Leeds Rhinos	N	McAlpine Stadium	W	24–10	Loughlin, Lowes, Medley, McNamara	McNamara 3/3, Cook 1/1	18,193
3 May 1997	Cup	Final	St. Helens	N	Wembley Stadium	L	22–32	Loughlin, Lowes, Peacock, Tomlinson	McNamara 3/4	78,022

== World Club Challenge ==
LEGEND
Win
Draw
Loss

Date	Competition	Rnd	Vrs	H/A	Venue	Result	Score	Tries	Goals	Att
9 June 1997	WCC	1	Penrith Panthers	H	Odsal Stadium	L	16–20	Peacock, Scales, Spruce	McNamara 2/3	14,378
14 June 1997	WCC	2	New Zealand Warriors	H	Odsal Stadium	L	16–20	Bradley, Forshaw	McNamara 3/3, Loughlin 1/1	13,133
20 June 1997	WCC	3	Cronulla Sharks	H	Odsal Stadium	L	10–30	Loughlin, Nickle	Loughlin 1/2	10,756
20 July 1997	WCC	4	New Zealand Warriors	A	Mount Smart Stadium	L	14–64	Bradley, Lowes, McDermott	Loughlin 1/3	12,500
28 July 1997	WCC	5	Penrith Panthers	A	Penrith Park	L	14–54	Calland, Forshaw, Peacock	Hodgson 1/3	5,336
2 August 1997	WCC	6	Cronulla Sharks	A	Endeavour Field	L	12–40	Bradley (2)	McNamara 2/2	8,272
3 October 1997	WCC	QF	New Zealand Warriors	A	Mount Smart Stadium	L	14–62	Bradley, Ekoku	McNamara 3/3	12,063

== 1997 squad statistics ==
Statistics include appearances and points in the Super League, Premiership, Challenge Cup and World Club Challenge.

No	Player	Position	Tries	Goals	DG	Points
1	Robbie Paul	Fullback	11	0	0	44
2	Glen Tomlinson	Stand Off	12	0	0	48
3	Graeme Bradley	Centre	13	0	0	52
4	Abi Ekoku	Wing	5	0	0	20
5	Jon Scales	Wing	10	0	0	40
6	Danny Peacock	Stand Off	16	0	0	64
7	Paul Cook	Scrum-half	5	15	0	50
8	Jeff Wittenberg	Wing	4	0	0	16
9	Kevin Crouthers	Hooker	1	0	0	4
10	Nathan Graham	Fullback	3	0	0	12
11	Jeremy Donougher	Second Row	2	0	0	8
12	Paul Medley	Second Row	3	0	0	12
13	Sonny Nickle	Loose forward	8	0	0	32
14	Mike Forshaw	Second Row	8	0	0	32
15	Gary Christie	Wing	1	0	0	4
16	Warren Jowitt	Prop	3	0	0	12
17	Paul Anderson	Prop	3	0	0	12
18	Simon Knox	Loose forward	5	0	0	20
20	Matt Calland	Centre	8	0	0	32
22	Brian McDermott	Prop	7	0	0	28
23	Bernard Dwyer	Second Row	5	0	0	20
24	Paul Loughlin	Centre	13	9	0	70
25	James Lowes	Hooker	17	0	0	68
26	Steve McNamara	Loose forward	8	133	1	299
27	Tahi Reihana	Centre	0	0	0	0
28	Stuart Spruce	Fullback	10	0	0	40
30	Andy Hodgson	Centre	4	1	0	18
