= 1998 Bradford Bulls season =

- Super League III Rank: 5th
- Play-off result: Elimination Play-off
- Challenge Cup: 5th Round
- 1998 record: Wins: 13; draws: 0; losses: 13
- Points scored: For: 591; against: 540

Team information
- Chairman: Chris Caisley
- Head Coach: Matthew Elliot
- Captain: Robbie Paul
- Stadium: Odsal Stadium
- Avg. attendance: 13,026
- High attendance: 19,188 vs. Leeds Rhinos

Top scorers
- Tries: Tevita Vaikona (13)
- Goals: Steve McNamara (81)
- Points: Steve McNamara (170)
← 1997	List of seasons	1999 →

This article details the Bradford Bulls rugby league football club's 1998 season, the 3rd season of the Super League era.

== Season review ==
February 1998

The 1998 season started off with a 48–10 win over Rochdale Hornets in the Challenge Cup 4th Round, it was in this game that Wigan Warriors legend Shaun Edwards made his try scoring debut with the Bulls. However soon they were knocked out of the Cup for the 1st time before the final since the Super League started. It was Castleford Tigers who scored late in the game to beat Bradford 26–21.

April 1998

Bradford started off their league hopes with a 38–6 win against newly promoted Huddersfield Giants. However they were brought down to earth when they lost 26–6 to arch-rivals Leeds Rhinos after a sublime display from fullback Iestyn Harris. Bradford were soon back winning points as they ground out a hard-fought 11–4 win against Sheffield Eagles. The Bulls managed to get their 1st back to back wins of the season as they struggled against Hull Sharks but just about scraped a 26–24 win.

May 1998

The Bulls won their next game 18–4 against St. Helens however the week after Halifax Blue Sox beat Bradford 21–16 in a thrilling encounter. Bradford bounced back though by stuffing Castleford Tigers 52–10 and then dispatched of London Broncos 17–14.

June 1998

June started off poor for the Bulls as they lost 28–10 to Warrington Wolves after Graeme Bradley was sent off. Bradford also lost to eventual champions Wigan Warriors 28–12. The Bulls bad run continued with a shock 11–10 loss to Salford City Reds with Paul Medley scoring Bradford's only try. Bradford got back to winning ways with a comprehensive 36–10 victory over Huddersfield Giants.

July 1998

Bradford got off to a great start in July as they beat arch-rivals Leeds Rhinos 33–22 at Headingley. The Bulls travelled to Tynecastle Stadium to play London Broncos in an attempt to spread rugby league into Scotland, the Bulls lost to London 22–8 with ex Bulls player Shaun Edwards pulling the strings for the Broncos.

August 1998

Sheffield Eagles added to the Bulls misery when they beat Bradford 38–18 to kick off August, however it wasn't long before the Bulls won again as they beat Hull Sharks 38–18 with Tevita Vaikona scoring 2 tries against his former side. Bradford were brought back to earth with a 33–25 defeat at St. Helens, a late Tommy Martyn try and a Sean Long drop goal won it for the Saints. Halifax Blue Sox continued their fine run of form by beating the Bulls 25–12 at The Shay. The final game in August saw the Bulls beat Castleford Tigers 24–8 to get back to winning ways.

September 1998

The month didn't start well for Bradford as they received a 34–8 hammering by London Broncos. The Bulls responded to this defeat by beating Warrington Wolves 36–8 at Odsal Stadium. The final two games saw contrasting results, the 1st saw the Bulls get hammered by Wigan Warriors 38–4 and the 2nd saw them destroy Salford City Reds 40–18 in the final league game of the year.

October 1998

The Bulls crashed out of the playoffs when they lost 46–24 to St. Helens at Knowsley Road.

== 1998 milestones ==
- CCR4: Shaun Edwards and Tevita Vaikona scored their 1st tries for the Bulls.
- CCR4: James Lowes kicked his 1st goal for the Bulls.
- Round 2: Matt Calland scored his 25th try and reached 100 points for the Bulls.
- Round 3: Nathan Graham kicked his 1st drop-goal for the Bulls.
- Round 5: Steve McNamara reached 500 points for the Bulls.
- Round 7: Robbie Paul scored his 5th hat-trick for the Bulls.
- Round 12: Paul Deacon scored his 1st try and kicked his first goal for the Bulls.
- Round 16: Nathan McAvoy scored his 1st try for the Bulls.
- Round 19: Steve McNamara reached 600 points for the Bulls.
- Round 23: Neil Harmon and Harvey Howard scored their 1st tries for the Bulls.

== Table ==
	Team	Pld	W	D	L	PF	PA	PD	Pts
1	Wigan Warriors	23	21	0	2	762	222	+540	42
2	Leeds Rhinos	23	19	0	4	662	369	+293	38
3	Halifax Blue Sox	23	18	0	5	658	390	+268	36
4	St. Helens	23	14	1	8	673	459	+214	29
5	Bradford Bulls	23	12	0	11	498	450	+48	24
6	Castleford Tigers	23	10	1	12	446	522	−76	21
7	London Broncos	23	10	0	13	415	476	−61	20
8	Sheffield Eagles	23	8	2	13	495	541	−46	18
9	Hull Sharks	23	8	0	15	421	574	−153	16
10	Warrington Wolves	23	7	1	15	411	645	−234	15
11	Salford City Reds	23	6	1	16	319	575	−256	13
12	Huddersfield Giants	23	2	0	21	288	825	−537	4

Play-offs

== 1998 fixtures and results ==
LEGEND
Win
Draw
Loss

1998 JJB Sports Super League

Date	Competition	Rnd	Vrs	H/A	Venue	Result	Score	Tries	Goals	Att
3 April 1998	Super League III	1	Huddersfield Giants	A	McAlpine Stadium	W	38–6	Vaikona (2), Bradley, Edwards, Forshaw, Peacock, Spruce	McNamara 5/7	12,417
12 April 1998	Super League III	2	Leeds Rhinos	H	Odsal Stadium	L	6–26	Calland	McNamara 1/2	19,188
17 April 1998	Super League III	3	Sheffield Eagles	A	Don Valley Stadium	W	11–4	Edwards, Spruce	McNamara 1/2, Graham 1 DG	6,200
26 April 1998	Super League III	4	Hull Sharks	A	The Boulevard	W	26–24	Calland (2), Peacock (2), Vaikona	McNamara 3/5	9,447
10 May 1998	Super League III	5	St. Helens	H	Odsal Stadium	W	18–4	Lowes, McDermott, Vaikona	McNamara 3/3	14,091
17 May 1998	Super League III	6	Halifax Blue Sox	H	Odsal Stadium	L	16–21	Paul (2), Vaikona	McNamara 2/3	16,337
22 May 1998	Super League III	7	Castleford Tigers	A	The Jungle	W	52–10	Paul (3), Edwards (2), McDermott (2), Donougher, Peacock, Vaikona	McNamara 6/10	8,043
29 May 1998	Super League III	8	London Broncos	H	Odsal Stadium	W	17–14	Bradley, Lowes, McDermott	McNamara 2/3, McNamara 1 DG	11,893
7 June 1998	Super League III	9	Warrington Wolves	A	Wilderspool Stadium	L	10–28	Calland, Vaikona	McNamara 1/2	6,054
12 June 1998	Super League III	10	Wigan Warriors	H	Odsal Stadium	L	12–28	McDermott, Vaikona	McNamara 2/2	14,103
21 June 1998	Super League III	11	Salford City Reds	A	The Willows	L	10–11	Medley	McNamara 3/3	6,319
28 June 1998	Super League III	12	Huddersfield Giants	H	Odsal Stadium	W	36–10	Bradley (2), Deacon, Forshaw, Lowes, Spruce	McNamara 5/5, Deacon 1/1	12,024
3 July 1998	Super League III	13	Leeds Rhinos	A	Headingley Stadium	W	33–22	Forshaw (2), Calland, Paul, Scales	McNamara 6/6, McNamara 1 DG	16,824
18 July 1998	Super League III	14	London Broncos	N	Tynecastle Stadium	L	8–22	Bradley, Scales	McNamara 0/2	6,863
2 August 1998	Super League III	15	Sheffield Eagles	H	Odsal Stadium	L	18–38	Bradley (2), Lowes	McNamara 3/3	11,493
9 August 1998	Super League III	16	Hull Sharks	H	Odsal Stadium	W	38–18	Vaikona (2), Forshaw, McAvoy, Paul, Scales	McNamara 7/7	11,294
16 August 1998	Super League III	17	St. Helens	A	Knowsley Road	L	25–33	Vaikona (2), Bradley, Spruce	McNamara 4/4, McNamara 1 DG	6,955
23 August 1998	Super League III	18	Halifax Blue Sox	A	The Shay	L	12–25	Deacon, McDermott	McNamara 2/2	7,566
31 August 1998	Super League III	19	Castleford Tigers	H	Odsal Stadium	W	24–8	Lowes, Scales, Spruce	McNamara 6/6	10,946
6 September 1998	Super League III	20	London Broncos	A	The Stoop	L	8–34	Bradley	McNamara 2/2	4,562
13 September 1998	Super League III	21	Warrington Wolves	H	Odsal Stadium	W	36–8	Lowes (2), Bradley, Ekoku, Paul, Spruce	McNamara 4/4, Deacon 2/2	10,815
20 September 1998	Super League III	22	Wigan Warriors	A	Central Park	L	4–38	Ekoku	McNamara 0/1	11,181
27 September 1998	Super League III	23	Salford City Reds	H	Odsal Stadium	W	40–18	Deacon (2), Bradley, Harmon, Howard, McNamara, Paul	McNamara 5/6, Deacon 1/1	11,102

== Challenge Cup ==
LEGEND
Win
Draw
Loss

Date	Competition	Rnd	Vrs	H/A	Venue	Result	Score	Tries	Goals	Att
15 February 1998	Cup	4th	Rochdale Hornets	A	Spotland Stadium	W	48–10	Forshaw (2), Calland, Edwards, Jowitt, Lowes, Paul, Spruce, Vaikona	Lowes 3/5, McNamara 3/4	5,466
28 February 1998	Cup	5th	Castleford Tigers	A	The Jungle	L	21–26	Calland, Lowes, Peacock, Spruce	Lowes 1/2, McNamara 1/2, McNamara 1 DG	10,283

== Playoffs ==
LEGEND
Win
Draw
Loss

Date	Competition	Rnd	Vrs	H/A	Venue	Result	Score	Tries	Goals	Att
2 October 1998	Play-offs	EPO	St. Helens	A	Knowsley Road	L	24–46	Donougher (2), Crouthers, Graham	McNamara 4/4	8,393

== 1998 squad statistics ==
- Appearances and points include (Super League, Challenge Cup and Play-offs)

No	Player	Position	Tries	Goals	DG	Points
1	Robbie Paul	Fullback	10	0	0	40
2	Tevita Vaikona	Wing	13	0	0	52
3	Graeme Bradley	Centre	11	0	0	44
4	Abi Ekoku	Centre	2	0	0	8
5	Jon Scales	Wing	4	0	0	16
6	Danny Peacock	Stand Off	5	0	0	20
8	Neil Harmon	Prop	1	0	0	4
9	Kevin Crouthers	Hooker	1	0	0	4
10	Nathan Graham	Fullback	1	0	1	5
11	Jeremy Donougher	Second Row	3	0	0	12
12	Paul Medley	Second Row	1	0	0	4
13	Sonny Nickle	Loose forward	0	0	0	0
14	Mike Forshaw	Loose forward	7	0	0	28
15	Paul Anderson	Prop	0	0	0	0
16	Warren Jowitt	Prop	1	0	0	4
17	Nathan McAvoy	Wing	1	0	0	4
19	Harvey Howard	Prop	1	0	0	4
20	Matt Calland	Centre	7	0	0	28
22	Brian McDermott	Prop	6	0	0	24
23	Bernard Dwyer	Hooker	0	0	0	0
24	Paul Deacon	Scrum-half	4	4	0	24
25	James Lowes	Hooker	9	4	0	44
26	Steve McNamara	Loose forward	1	81	4	170
27	Tahi Reihana	Prop	0	0	0	0
28	Stuart Spruce	Fullback	8	0	0	32
29	Stuart Fielden	Prop	0	0	0	0
30	Andy Hodgson	Centre	0	0	0	0
32	Michael Banks	Prop	0	0	0	0
33	Leon Pryce	Wing	0	0	0	0
36	Simon Knox	Loose forward	0	0	0	0
47	Shaun Edwards	Scrum-half	5	0	0	20
