= 1996 Bradford Bulls season =

- Super League Rank: 3rd
- Play-off result: Semi-final
- Challenge Cup: Runners Up
- 1996 record: Wins: 21; draws: 0; losses: 7
- Points scored: For: 997; against: 545

Team information
- Chairman: Chris Caisley
- Coach: Brian Smith
- Captain: Robbie Paul
- Stadium: Odsal Stadium
- Avg. attendance: 10,346
- High attendance: 17,360 vs. Wigan Warriors

Top scorers
- Tries: Robbie Paul (23)
- Goals: Steve McNamara (82)
- Points: Steve McNamara (170)
← 1995–96	List of seasons	1997 →

The 1996 Bradford Bulls season was the 90th in the club's history. Coached by Brian Smith and captained by Robbie Paul the newly branded Bradford Bulls competed in Super League I. The Bulls finished the regular season in 3rd place and made the semi-final, losing 36-42 to Wigan Warriors. The Bulls also competed in the 1996 Challenge Cup, reaching the final which they lost 32-40 to St. Helens.

== Season review ==
February 1996

The 1996 season started off well for the Bradford Northern club newly re-branded as the Bradford Bulls. In their first competitive match they defeated Batley 60–18 in the 4th round of the 1996 Challenge Cup. Australian import Jeremy Donougher scored the club's first try under the Bulls brand. Bradford's form in the Cup continued after beating Division 1 side Leigh 44–12 at Hilton Park. The Bulls success continued as they hosted Wakefield Trinity in the quarter-finals, however after a brief scare Bradford managed to overcome Wakefield and win 30–18.

March 1996

March started off in the Challenge Cup semi-final against the Leeds, the Bulls played some secured a 28–6 win, earning them a place in the 1996 Challenge Cup Final. Bradford also kicked off the new Super League I with a 30–18 win over Castleford Tigers in front of a 10,000 person crowd.

April 1996

A trip to Sheffield Eagles was on the cards for the Bulls first away trip of the Super League season, however the Eagles were just too powerful for Bradford and the Bulls were soundly beaten 24–40. However April got a little brighter as the Bulls bounced back to beat London 31–24 to take them up to 5th in the league table. The Bulls were brought back down to earth after their win against London as St. Helens beat Bradford 26–20 at Knowsley Road. Bradford suffered back to back defeats for the first time this season, losing 22–6 to Wigan. Bradford narrowly lost in the 1996 Challenge Cup Final against St. Helens, Bradford went 26–12 at one point but Saints halfback Bobbie Goulding peppered the Bradford fullback Nathan Graham with bombs which turned out to be fruitful for the Saints who scored 3 tries of Goulding's kicks to win the match 40–32 leaving the Bradford players and fans feeling dejected.

May 1996

Bradford started off May in good form after losing the Challenge Cup Final by beating Warrington 36–14 at Odsal Stadium, the Bulls then travelled to Oldham and beat Oldham Bears 30–10. This would be Bradford's first back to back win of the season. The Bulls then beat Paris Saint-Germain 60–32 at home before destroying arch rivals Leeds 54–8 in Round 9. These wins took the Bulls to four games unbeaten and unbeaten for the whole of May.

June 1996

The Bulls started June with a massive 52–4 win over bottom of the league Workington, Bradford ran in 10 tries in this emphatic win. Bradford carried on their form at Thrum Hall where they scraped a win at local rivals Halifax Blue Sox in a hard-fought 22–20 contest. Bradford's 6 game unbeaten run was put to an end by a great performance by Castleford Tigers led by their talisman Frano Botica, the Tigers clinched the game 26–23. However the Bulls responded the following week by destroying the Sheffield Eagles 64–22 at Odsal. The Bulls followed up this win with a hard fought 22–16 win over London Broncos.

July 1996

Bradford beat St. Helens in an excellent display of rugby league, they took the Saints apart and won 50–22 to exact revenge for their Challenge Cup Final defeat. The Bulls excellent form continued as they battled Wigan at Odsal Stadium and the Yorkshire club came up with a 20–12 win. Their 5th consecutive win came at Wilderspool Stadium where they took on Warrington and came away with the spoils beating Warrington 30–20. The Bulls dished out another thumping however this one wasn't as impressive as it was against Oldham Bears, they did keep Oldham to zero points though as Bradford were 56–0 victors.

August 1996

August started off well for Bradford as they demolished arch-rivals Leeds 56–18 with the mercurial Robbie Paul grabbing his 3rd hat-trick of the season. The Bulls extended their winning streak to eight games when they beat bottom of the league Workington 28–14 in a hard fought contest. Local team Halifax Blue Sox put an end to the Bulls' winning streak as Bradford succumbed to a 27–26 defeat in the final home game of the season. The last regular season game came in Paris where the Bulls beat Paris Saint-Germain 27–14 which meant they finished 3rd in the league, 5 points behind Wigan and 6 points behind league leaders St. Helens. This meant that the Bulls had to travel to Central Park to play Wigan in the Premiership Trophy Semi-final, in what was his last game in a Wigan shirt Shaun Edwards scored 4 tries to end Bradford's hopes of a Premiership final appearance in a hard fought 42–36 Wigan win.

== Milestones ==
- CCR4: Bradford Bulls win their first competitive game after re-branding.
- CCR4: Jeremy Donougher scored the Bulls first try under the re-branded club.
- CCR4: Jeremy Donougher, Sonny Nickle, Davide Longo, Gary Christie, Paul Cook, Karl Fairbank, Carlos Hassan, Paul Loughlin and Paul Medley all scored their 1st tries for the Bulls.
- CCR4: Davide Longo scored his 1st hat-trick for the Bulls.
- CCR4: Paul Cook kicked his 1st goal for the Bulls.
- CCR5: Jon Scales and Simon Knox scored their 1st tries for the Bulls.
- CCQF: Graeme Bradley and Jason Donohue scored their 1st tries for the Bulls.
- CCSF: Jon Scales scored his 1st hat-trick for the Bulls.
- CCSF: Matt Calland scored his 1st try for the Bulls.
- Round 1: Jeremy Donougher scored his 1st hat-trick for the Bulls.
- Round 1: Robbie Paul scored his 1st try for the Bulls.
- Round 1: Paul Loughlin kicked his 1st goal for the club.
- Round 2: James Lowes scored his 1st try for the Bulls.
- Round 3: Bernard Dwyer scored his 1st try for the Bulls.
- Round 3: Paul Cook kicked his 1st drop-goal for the Bulls.
- Round 4: Matt Calland scored his 1st hat-trick for the Bulls.
- Round 4: Steve McNamara kicked his 1st goal for the Bulls.
- CC Final: Robbie Paul scored the 1st ever hat-trick in a cup final and scored his 1st hat-trick for the Bulls.
- Round 7: Brian McDermott scored his 1st try for the Bulls.
- Round 8: Glen Tomlinson scored his 1st try for the Bulls.
- Round 9: Stuart Spruce and Steve McNamara scored their 1st tries for the Bulls.
- Round 10: Paul Cook reached 100 points for the Bulls becoming the first player to do so under the new brand.
- Round 10: Joe Tamani scored his 1st try for the Bulls.
- Round 12: Steve McNamara kicked his 1st drop-goal for the Bulls.
- Round 18: Robbie Paul scored his 2nd hat-trick for the Bulls.
- Round 19: Robbie Paul scored his 3rd hat-trick for the Bulls.
- Premiership Trophy Semi-final: Graeme Bradley scored his 1st hat-trick for the Bulls.

== Table ==
Super League I
Pos	Team	Pld	W	D	L	PF	PA	PD	Pts	Qualification or relegation
1	St Helens (C)	22	20	0	2	950	455	+495	40	Qualified for Premiership semi final
2	Wigan	22	19	1	2	902	326	+576	39	Qualified for Premiership semi final
3	Bradford Bulls	22	17	0	5	767	409	+358	34	Qualified for Premiership semi final
4	London Broncos	22	12	1	9	611	462	+149	25	Qualified for Premiership semi final
5	Warrington Wolves	22	12	0	10	569	565	+4	24	
6	Halifax Blue Sox	22	10	1	11	667	576	+91	21	
7	Sheffield Eagles	22	10	0	12	599	730	−131	20	
8	Oldham Bears	22	9	1	12	473	681	−208	19	
9	Castleford Tigers	22	9	0	13	548	599	−51	18	
10	Leeds	22	6	0	16	555	745	−190	12	
11	Paris Saint-Germain	22	3	1	18	398	795	−397	7	
12	Workington Town (R)	22	2	1	19	325	1021	−696	5	Relegated to Division One

Source: Rugby League Project
Rules for classification: 1) Points; 2) Points difference; 3) Number of points scored;
(C) Champions; (R) Relegated

== Fixtures ==
=== Super League I ===
LEGEND
Win
Draw
Loss

Date	Competition	Rnd	Vrs	H/A	Venue	Result	Score	Tries	Goals	Att
31 March 1996	Super League I	1	Castleford Tigers	H	Odsal Stadium	W	30-18	Donougher (3), Paul (2), Calland	Loughlin 3/6	10,027
5 April 1996	Super League I	2	Sheffield Eagles	A	Don Valley Stadium	L	24-40	Calland (2), Lowes, Nickle	Cook 4/4	5,202
8 April 1996	Super League I	3	London Broncos	H	Odsal Stadium	W	31-24	Paul (2), Dwyer, Fairbank	Cook 7/7, Cook 1 DG	7,192
14 April 1996	Super League I	4	St. Helens	A	Knowsley Road	L	20-26	Calland (3), Scales	McNamara 2/4	10,010
19 April 1996	Super League I	5	Wigan	A	Central Park	L	6-22	Loughlin	Cook 1/1	9,872
5 May 1996	Super League I	6	Warrington Wolves	H	Odsal Stadium	W	36-14	Bradley, Calland, Knox, Loughlin, Medley, Paul, Scales	Cook 4/7	9,278
10 May 1996	Super League I	7	Oldham Bears	A	Watersheddings	W	30–10	Scales (2), Bradley, Dwyer, Loughlin, McDermott	Cook 1/4, McNamara 2/2	4,228
19 May 1996	Super League I	8	Paris Saint-Germain	H	Odsal Stadium	W	60–32	Fairbank (2), Bradley, Donougher, Dwyer, Hassan, Loughlin, Medley, Paul, Scales, Tomlinson	McNamara 8/11	8,194
24 May 1996	Super League I	9	Leeds	H	Odsal Stadium	W	54–8	Lowes (2), Spruce (2), Bradley, Fairbank, McDermott, McNamara, Scales	McNamara 9/9	10,229
2 June 1996	Super League I	10	Workington Town	H	Odsal Stadium	W	52–4	Calland (2), Cook, Hassan, Lowes, Medley, Paul, Spruce, Tamani, Tomlinson	Cook 6/10	8,658
9 June 1996	Super League I	11	Halifax Blue Sox	A	Thrum Hall	W	22–20	Calland, Lowes, Paul, Spruce	McNamara 3/4	7,187
16 June 1996	Super League I	12	Castleford Tigers	A	The Jungle	L	23–26	Cook, Donougher, Dwyer, Spruce	McNamara 3/4, McNamara 1 DG	6,275
23 June 1996	Super League I	13	Sheffield Eagles	H	Odsal Stadium	W	64–22	Paul (2), Scales (2), Spruce (2), Donougher, Loughlin, Lowes, Medley, McDermott, Tomlinson	McNamara 7/11, Cook 1/1	8,359
29 June 1996	Super League I	14	London Broncos	A	The Valley	W	22–16	Dwyer, Paul, Scales	McNamara 5/5	4,524
5 July 1996	Super League I	15	St. Helens	H	Odsal Stadium	W	50–22	Bradley (2), Donougher, Knox, Loughlin, Nickle, Scales, Spruce, Tamani	McNamara 7/9	11,467
12 July 1996	Super League I	16	Wigan	H	Odsal Stadium	W	20–12	Scales (2), Dwyer, Medley	McNamara 2/4	17,360
20 July 1996	Super League I	17	Warrington Wolves	A	Wilderspool Stadium	W	30–20	Bradley, Calland, Dwyer, McDermott	McNamara 7/7	8,423
28 July 1996	Super League I	18	Oldham Bears	H	Odsal Stadium	W	56–0	Paul (3), Tamani (2), Bradley, Loughlin, Lowes, Nickle, Tomlinson	McNamara 8/10	9,849
4 August 1996	Super League I	19	Leeds	A	Headingley Stadium	W	56–18	Paul (3), Loughlin (2), Cook, Lowes, Medley, McDermott, Nickle	McNamara 6/8, Cook 2/2	10,505
11 August 1996	Super League I	20	Workington Town	A	Derwent Park	W	28–14	Cook, Donougher, Lowes, Paul, Spruce	McNamara 4/5	2,430
18 August 1996	Super League I	21	Halifax Blue Sox	H	Odsal Stadium	L	26–27	Spruce (2), Bradley, Calland, Nickle	McNamara 2/4, Cook 1/1	13,196
24 August 1996	Super League I	22	Paris Saint-Germain	A	Stade Sébastien Charléty	W	27–14	Lowes (2), Bradley, Dwyer, Spruce	McNamara 3/5, McNamara 1 DG	6,152
31 August 1996	Premiership	Semi-final	Wigan	A	Central Park	L	36–42	Bradley (3), Paul (2), Calland, Tomlinson	McNamara 4/8	9,878

== Challenge Cup ==
LEGEND
Win
Draw
Loss

Date	Competition	Rnd	Vrs	H/A	Venue	Result	Score	Tries	Goals	Att
4 February 1996	Cup	4th	Batley	H	Odsal Stadium	W	60–18	Donougher, Nickle, Longo (3), Christie, Cook, Fairbank, Hassan (2), Loughlin, Medley	Cook 6/12	3,017
11 February 1996	Cup	5th	Leigh Centurions	A	Hilton Park	W	44–12	Scales, Medley, Knox (2), Cook, Hassan (2), Loughlin	Cook 6/8	4,100
25 February 1996	Cup	QF	Wakefield Trinity	H	Odsal Stadium	W	30–18	Bradley, Scales, Loughlin, Knox, Medley, Donohue	Cook 3/6	6,519
23 March 1996	Cup	SF	Leeds	N	McAlpine Stadium	W	28–6	Scales (3), Calland, Knox	Cook 4/5	17,139
27 April 1996	Cup	Final	St. Helens	N	Wembley Stadium	L	32–40	Paul (3), Dwyer, Scales	Cook 6/6	75,994

== Squad ==
Statistics include appearances and points in the Super League, Challenge Cup and Premiership Trophy.

Player	Apps	Tries	Goals	DG	Points
Graeme Bradley	28	14	0	0	56
Matt Calland	25	14	0	0	56
Gary Christie	10	1	0	0	4
Paul Cook	20	6	52	1	129
Jason Donohue	9	1	0	0	4
Jeremy Donougher	25	9	0	0	36
Bernard Dwyer	23	9	0	0	36
Karl Fairbank	25	5	0	0	20
Nathan Graham	11	0	0	0	0
Jon Hamer	2	0	0	0	0
Carlos Hassan	14	6	0	0	24
Andy Ireland	4	0	0	0	0
Warren Jowitt	1	0	0	0	0
Simon Knox	16	6	0	0	24
Davide Longo	8	3	0	0	12
Paul Loughlin	26	12	3	0	54
James Lowes	23	11	0	0	44
Brian McDermott	28	5	0	0	20
Steve McNamara	21	1	82	2	170
Paul Medley	24	9	0	0	36
Sonny Nickle	23	6	0	0	24
Robbie Paul	28	23	0	0	92
Jon Scales	24	18	0	0	72
Stuart Spruce	14	12	0	0	48
Neil Summers	1	0	0	0	0
Joe Tamani	15	4	0	0	16
Glen Tomlinson	19	5	0	0	20

== Transfers ==
=== In ===
Player	From	Fee	Date	Ref
James Lowes	Leeds		February 1996	
Glen Tomlinson	Batley		March 1996	
Steve McNamara	Hull		April 1996	
Stuart Spruce	Widnes		May 1996	
Joe Tamani	Adelaide Rams		May 1996	

=== Out ===
Player	To	Fee	Date	Ref
Alan Wilson	Huddersfield Giants		January 1996	
Paul Round	Castleford Tigers		March 1996	
Neil Summers	Featherstone Rovers		May 1996	
Davide Longo	Swinton Lions		December 1996	
