= List of Bradford Bulls internationals =

| (United Kingdom) Great Britain | New Zealand | Australia | Papua New Guinea |
|---|---|---|---|
| Terry Newton | Robbie Paul | Brad Meyers | Marcus Bai |
| Paul Deacon | Joe Vagana | Chris McKenna | Stanley Gene |
| Iestyn Harris | Henry Paul | Brad Mackay | |
| Jamie Peacock | Shontayne Hape | Daniel Gartner | |
| Leon Pryce | Tevita Vaikona | | |
| Stuart Reardon | Logan Swann | | |
| Stuart Fielden | Tame Tupou | | |
| Paul Anderson | | | |
| Lee Gilmour | | | |
| James Lowes | | | |
| Mike Forshaw | | | |
| Lee Gilmour | | | |
| Paul Johnson | | | |
| Steve McNamara | | | |
| Brian McDermott | | | |
| Karl Pratt | | | |
| Shaun Edwards Frank Whitcombe | | | |

| England | (Republic of Ireland) Ireland | Scotland | Wales |
|---|---|---|---|
| Andy Lynch | Michael Withers | Nathan Graham | Iestyn Harris |
| Jamie Langley | James Lowes | Graham Mackay | Daio Powell |
| Lee Radford | Bernard Dwyer | Brad MacKay | Steve Thomas |
| Nathan McAvoy | Craig McElhatton | Lee Gilmour | |
| Richard Moore | Neil Harmon | Alex Szoskak | |
| Scot Naylor | Richard Smith | Ian Henderson | |
| Stuart Fielden | | Simon Knox | |
| Paul Anderson | | Gary Christie | |
| Jamie Peacock | | | |
| Stuart Spruce | | | |
| Mike Forshaw | | | |
| Steve McNamara | | | |
| Marcus St Hilaire | | | |
| Terry Newton | | | |
| Rob Parker | | | |
| Paul Sykes | | | |
| Brett Ferres | | | |
| Matt Cook | | | |
| Paul Cook | | | |

== Players earning International Caps while at Bradford ==
- Paul Anderson won caps for England while at Bradford Bulls in 2000 against Australia (sub), Fiji, Ireland, New Zealand (sub), in 2001 against Wales, and won caps for Great Britain while at Bradford Bulls in 1999 against Australia (sub), in 2001 against France (sub), Australia (sub) (3 matches), in 2002 against New Zealand (sub) (3 matches), in 2003 against Australia (sub) (2 matches)
- David "Dave" Barends won caps for Other Nationalities while at Bradford Northern, and York F.C., and won caps for Great Britain while at Bradford Northern in 1979 against Australia (2 matches)
- Eric Batten won caps for England while at Hunslet in 1938 against Wales, in 1939 against France, Wales, in 1940 against Wales, in 1941 against Wales, in 1943 against Wales, while at Bradford Northern in 1944 against Wales, in 1945 against Wales (2 matches), in 1946 against France (2 matches), Wales, in 1947 against France, in 1948 against France, and won caps for Great Britain while at Bradford Northern in 1946 against Australia (2 matches), New Zealand, in 1947 against New Zealand
- Stan Brogden won caps for England while at Bradford Northern in 1929 against Other Nationalities, while at Huddersfield in 1932 against Wales (2 matches), in 1933 against Other Nationalities, Australia, while at Leeds in 1935 against France, Wales, in 1936 against Wales (2 matches), France, in 1938 against Wales, while at Hull F.C. in 1938 against Wales, in 1939 against France, in 1941 against Wales, in 1943 against Wales, and won caps for Great Britain while at Huddersfield in 1929-30 against Australia, in 1932 against Australia (3 matches), New Zealand (3 matches), in 1933 against Australia (2 matches), while at Leeds in 1936 against Australia (3 matches), New Zealand (2 matches), in 1937 against Australia (2 matches)
- Matthew "Matt" Calland won a cap for England while at Bradford Bull in 1996 against France (sub)
- Des Case won caps for Wales while at Bradford Northern 1938...1947 4-caps
- Leonard "Len" Casey won caps for England while at Hull K.R. in 1978 against France, Wales, in 1980 against Wales, in 1981 against France, Wales, and won caps for Great Britain while at Hull K.R. in 1977 against France (sub), New Zealand (sub), Australia, in 1978 against Australia, while at Bradford Northern in 1979 against Australia (2 matches), New Zealand (3 matches), while at Hull K.R. in 1980 against New Zealand (3 matches), in 1983 against France (2 matches)
- Matthew "Matt" Cook won caps for England while at Bradford Bulls in 2006 against France (sub), Tonga (sub)
- Gerald Cordle won caps for Wales while at Bradford Northern in 1992 against France (sub), and England, in 1993 against New Zealand, in 1994 against France, and Australia (sub), in 1996 against France, and won a cap for Great Britain while at Bradford Northern in 1990 against France
- Malcolm Davies won caps for Wales while at Leigh, and Bradford Northern 1953...1959 2-caps
- William "Billy" Thomas Harcourt Davies won caps for Wales while at Bradford Northern 1939...1948 9-caps
- Paul Deacon won caps for England while at Bradford Bulls in 1999 against France (2 matches), in 2000 against Russia, Fiji, Ireland, New Zealand, in 2001 against Wales, and won caps for Great Britain while at Bradford Bulls in 2001 against France, Australia, in 2002 against New Zealand (3 matches), in 2003 against Australia (2 matches), Australia (sub), in 2005 against Australia, New Zealand (2 matches)
- Alan Edwards won caps for Wales while at Salford, and Bradford Northern 1935...1948 18-caps, and won caps for Great Britain while at Salford in 1936 against Australia (3 matches), and New Zealand (2 matches); and in 1937 against Australia (2 matches)
- Harold Edwards won caps for Wales while at Wigan, and Bradford Northern 1935...1938 2-caps
- Hagan Evans won caps for Wales while at Bradford Northern, and Hull 1947...1949 2-caps
- Karl Fairbank won caps for Great Britain while at Bradford Northern in the 1985 - 1988 Rugby League World Cup in 1987 against Papua New Guinea (sub), in 1990 against France, Papua New Guinea, and Australia (sub), in 1991 against France, in the 1989 - 1992 Rugby League World Cup in 1991 against Papua New Guinea (sub), in 1992 against France, in the 1989 - 1992 Rugby League World Cup in 1992 against France, in 1992 against Papua New Guinea, and New Zealand (sub), in 1993 against France (sub), and New Zealand (3 matches), and in 1994 against France
- Stanley "Stan" Fearnley won a cap for England while at Bradford Northern in 1975 against Australia
- Brett Ferres won caps for England while at Bradford Bulls in 2006 against France, Tonga (2 matches), Samoa
- Stuart Fielden won caps for England while at Bradford Bulls in 2000 against Australia, Russia (sub), Fiji (sub), Ireland, New Zealand, and won caps for Great Britain while at Bradford Bulls in 2001 against Australia, Australia (sub) (2 matches), France (sub), in 2002 against Australia, New Zealand (3 matches), in 2003 against Australia (3 matches), in 2004 against Australia (3 matches), New Zealand (2 matches), in 2005 against Australia (2 matches), New Zealand (2 matches), while at Wigan in 2006 against New Zealand (3 matches), Australia (2 matches)
- Tony Fisher won caps for Wales while at Bradford Northern in 1970 against England, while at Leeds in 1975 against France, England, Australia, New, Zealand, England, Australia, New, Zealand, in 1977 against England, France, in 1978 against Australia, and won caps for Great Britain while at Bradford/Leeds in 1970 against Australia (2 matches), New Zealand (3 matches), Australia (2 matches), while at Leeds in 1971 against France (2 matches), in 1978 against Australia (2 matches) (World Cup in 1970 2-caps)
- Michael "Mike" Forshaw won caps for England while at Bradford Bulls in 2000 against Australia, Ireland, New Zealand, and won caps for Great Britain while at Bradford Bulls in 1997 against ASL (2 matches) (sub), in 1998 against New Zealand (sub), in 1999 against New Zealand (sub), in 2001 against France (sub), Australia (3 matches), in 2002 against New Zealand (3 matches), in 2003 against Australia (2 matches), Australia (sub)
- Colin Forsyth won caps for England while at Bradford Northern in 1975 against France, New Zealand, Wales
- Trevor Foster won caps for Wales while at Bradford Northern 1939...1951 16-caps, and won caps for Great Britain while at Bradford Northern in 1946 against New Zealand, and in 1948 against Australia (2 matches)
- Deryck Fox won caps for England while at Bradford Bulls in 1995 against Wales, France, and won caps for Great Britain while at Featherstone Rovers in 1985 against France (2 matches), New Zealand (3 matches), in 1986 against France (2 matches), Australia (2 matches), in 1989 against New Zealand (sub), in 1990 against Papua New Guinea (sub), in 1991 against Papua New Guinea (sub), in 1992 against France (sub), while at Bradford Bulls in 1992 against Australia
- George Leslie "Les" Grainge won a cap for England while at Bradford Northern in 1938 against France
- Jeff Grayshon won caps for England while at Dewsbury in 1975 against Wales, France, New Zealand, Australia, Australia, in 1977 against Wales, while at Bradford Northern in 1979 against Wales, France, in 1980 against Wales (sub), France, in 1981 against Wales, and won caps for Great Britain, in 1979 against Australia (2 matches), New Zealand (3 matches), in 1980 against New Zealand (2 matches), in 1981 against France (2 matches), in 1982 against Australia (2 matches), while at Leeds in 1985 against New Zealand (2 matches)
- Ellery Hanley won caps for England while at Bradford Northern in 1984 against Wales, while at Leeds in 1992 against Wales, and won caps for Great Britain while at Bradford Northern in 1984 against France (sub), France, Australia (3 matches), New Zealand (3 matches), Papua New Guinea, in 1985 against France (2 matches), while at Wigan in 1985 against New Zealand (3 matches), in 1986 against France, Australia, in 1987 against France (2 matches), Papua New Guinea, in 1988 against France (2 matches), Papua New Guinea, Australia (3 matches), New Zealand, in 1989 against France (2 matches), in 1990 against France, Australia (3 matches), in 1991 against France (2 matches), while at Leeds in 1992 against Australia, in 1993 against France
- Iestyn Harris won caps for Wales while at Warrington while at Leeds while at Bradford ≥1995 against ?-caps, and won caps for Great Britain while at Warrington while at Leeds while at Bradford Bulls in 1996...2004 against 12-caps, won caps for Wales RU while at Cardiff Blues in 2001...04 against ?-caps
- Leonard "Len" Higson won caps for England while at Wakefield Trinity in 1932 against Wales, while at Bradford Northern in 1941 against Wales
- David Hobbs won caps for England while at Featherstone Rovers in 1984 against Wales, and won caps for Great Britain while at Featherstone Rovers in 1984 against France (2 matches), Australia, Australia (sub), New Zealand (3 matches), Papua New Guinea, while at Oldham in 1987 against France (2 matches), while at Bradford Northern in 1989 against New Zealand, New Zealand (sub)
- Harvey Howard won caps for England while at Leeds in 1995 against Wales, while at Brisbane in 2000 against Australia, Russia (sub), Fiji (sub), Ireland (sub), New Zealand, and won caps for Great Britain while at Bradford Bulls in 1998 against New Zealand (sub)
- William "Billy" Hutchinson won caps for England while at Bradford Northern in 1944 against Wales, in 1945 against Wales
- Phil Jackson won caps for England while at Bradford Northern in 1975 against Wales, France (World Cup in 1975 1-cap)
- Richard "Dick" Jasiewicz won a cap for Great Britain while at Bradford Northern in 1984 against France
- Jack Kitching won caps for England while at Bradford Northern in 1945 against Wales, in 1946 against France, Wales, in 1947 against Wales, and won caps for Great Britain while at Bradford Northern in 1946 against Australia
- Jamie Langley won caps for England while at Bradford Bulls in 2004 against Russia, France, Ireland, and won caps for Great Britain while at Bradford Bulls in 2007 against Fiji (sub)
- Andrew "Andy" Lynch won caps for England while at Castleford in 2004 against Russia, France, Ireland, while at Bradford Bulls in 2005 against France (sub), New Zealand (sub), and won caps for Great Britain while at Bradford Bulls in 2007 against France
- Arthur Mann won caps for England while at Bradford Northern in 1908 against Wales, in 1909 against Australia (3 matches), and won caps for Great Britain while at Bradford Northern in 1908-09 against Australia (2 matches)
- Nathan McAvoy won caps for England while at Salford in 1996 against Wales, while at Bradford Bulls in 1999 against France, France (sub)
- Brian McDermott won caps for England while at Bradford Bulls in 2001 against Wales, and won caps for Great Britain while at Bradford Bulls in 1996 against Fiji, in 1997 against ASL (3 matches)
- Steve McNamara won caps for England while at Hull F.C. in 1995 against Wales (sub), France, while at Bradford Bulls in 1996 against France, in 1999 against France (2 matches), and won caps for Great Britain while at Hull F.C. in 1992 against France (sub), in 1993 against France (sub), while at Bradford Bulls in 1997 against ASL (2 matches) (sub)
- 'Big' Jim Mills won caps for Wales while at Bradford Northern, and Widnes 1969...1979 (14?)17-caps 3-tries 9-points, and won caps for "Great Britain" in 1974 against Australia (2 matches), and New Zealand, in 1978 against Australia, and in 1979 against Australia
- John "Jack" W. or D. Moore won a cap for England while at Bradford Northern in 1940 against Wales
- Keith Mumby won caps for England while at Bradford Northern in 1979 against Wales, France, and won caps for Great Britain while at Bradford Northern in 1982 against Australia, in 1983 against France, in 1984 against France (2 matches), Australia (3 matches), New Zealand (3 matches), Papua New Guinea
- Michael "Mick" Murphy won caps for Wales while at Bradford Northern in the 1975 Rugby League World Cup against France, New Zealand, and France
- Scott Naylor won caps for England while at Bradford Bulls in 2000 against Australia, Fiji, Ireland (sub), New Zealand
- Paul Newlove won caps for England while at Featherstone Rovers in 1992 against Wales, while at Bradford Bulls in 1995 against Wales, Australia (2 matches), Fiji, Wales, St. Helens in 1996 against France, and won caps for Great Britain while at Featherstone Rovers in 1989 against New Zealand (sub), New Zealand (2 matches), in 1991 against Papua New Guinea, in 1992 against Papua New Guinea (sub), Australia (3 matches), New Zealand (sub), in 1993 against France, while at Bradford New Zealand (3 matches), in 1994 against France, Australia, Australia (sub), St. Helens in 1997 against ASL (3 matches), in 1998 against New Zealand
- Terry Newton won caps for England while at Leeds in 1999 against France (2 matches), while at Wigan in 2001 against Wales, and won caps for Great Britain while at Leeds in 1998 against New Zealand, while at Wigan in 2002 against Australia (sub), in 2003 against Australia (3 matches), in 2004 against Australia (3 matches), New Zealand, while at Bradford Bulls in 2006 against New Zealand (2 matches), New Zealand (sub), Australia (2 matches), in 2007 against New Zealand
- Rob Parker won caps for England while at Bradford Bulls in 2004 against Russia, France, Ireland
- Jamie Peacock won caps for England while at Bradford Bulls in 2000 against Russia, Fiji, Ireland (sub), New Zealand (sub), in 2001 against Wales, and won caps for Great Britain while at Bradford Bulls in 2001 against Australia (2 matches), Australia (sub), in 2002 against Australia, New Zealand, New Zealand (sub) (2 matches), in 2003 against Australia (3 matches), in 2004 against Australia (3 matches), New Zealand, in 2005 against Australia (2 matches), New Zealand (2 matches), while at Leeds in 2006 against New Zealand (3 matches), Australia (2 matches), in 2007 against New Zealand (3 matches)
- Daio Powell won caps for Wales while at Bradford Northern 1994(...1998?) 1(4?)-caps + 2-caps (sub) 2-tries 8-points
- Christopher "Chris" Preece won a cap for Wales while at Bradford Northern in the 28-9 defeat by England at Eugene Cross Park, Ebbw Vale on Sunday 14 October 1984
- Terry Price represented the British and Irish Lions (RU) while at Llanelli RFC on the 1966 tour of Australia and New Zealand, won caps for Wales (RU) while at Llanelli RFC in 1965 against England, Scotland, Ireland, and France, in 1966 against England, and Australia, and in 1967 against Scotland, and France, won a cap for Great Britain (RL) while at Bradford Northern in 1970 against Australia, and won caps for Wales (RL) while at Bradford Northern 1968...1970 5-caps
- Leon Pryce won caps for England while at Bradford Bulls in 1999 against France, in 2000 against Australia, Russia, in 2001 against Wales, and won caps for Great Britain while at Bradford Bulls in 2001 against Australia (3 matches), in 2002 against New Zealand (3 matches), in 2005 against Australia (2 matches), New Zealand (2 matches), St. Helens in 2006 against New Zealand (3 matches), Australia (2 matches), in 2007 against New Zealand (2 matches)
- Brian Radford won a cap for Wales while Bradford Northern 1952 1-cap
- Lee Radford won caps for England while at Bradford Bulls in 2001 against Wales (sub), in 2005 against France, New Zealand, while at Hull F.C. in 2006 against France, Tonga (2 matches), Samoa
- John "Johnny" Rae won a cap for Great Britain while at Bradford Northern in 1965 against New Zealand
- Alan Rathbone won caps for Great Britain while at Bradford Northern in 1982 against France, and Australia, in 1983 against France (2 matches), and in 1985 against France (2 matches)
- Stuart Reardon won caps for England while at Bradford Bulls in 2005 against France, New Zealand (sub), and won caps for Great Britain while at Bradford Bulls in 2004 against Australia (3 matches), New Zealand (2 matches)
- Alan Redfearn won caps for England while at Bradford Northern in 1979 against France, in 1980 against France, and won caps for Great Britain while at Bradford Northern in 1979 against Australia
- David Redfearn won caps for England while at Bradford Northern in 1975 against France, Australia, and won caps for Great Britain while at Bradford Northern in 1972 against New Zealand (sub), in 1974 against France (2 matches), Australia, New Zealand (3 matches) (World Cup in 1972 1-cap)
- Roger Simpson won a cap for England while at Bradford Bulls in 1995 against France (sub)
- Thomas "Tommy" Smales won caps for England while at Huddersfield in 1962 against France, while Unattached in 1975 against Papua New Guinea (sub) (Is the only player to ever win an England cap while Unattached), and won caps for Great Britain while at Huddersfield in 1962 against France, in 1963 against France, Australia, in 1964 against France (2 matches), while at Bradford Northern in 1965 against New Zealand (3 matches)
- Herbert Smith won caps for England while at Halifax in 1927 against Wales, and won caps for Great Britain while at Bradford Northern in 1926-27 against New Zealand (2 matches)
- Richard Smith won caps for Ireland while Bradford Bulls, Hull Kingston Rovers, and Wakefield Trinity Wildcats 1995...2001 8-caps
- Stuart Spruce won caps for England while at Widnes in 1992 against Wales, while at Bradford Bulls in 2000 against Russia (sub), Fiji, and won caps for Great Britain while at Widnes in 1993 against France, while at Bradford Bulls in 1996 against Papua New Guinea, Fiji, New Zealand (3 matches)
- Steve Thomas won caps for Wales while at Bradford Bulls, London Broncos, and Celtic Crusaders 1999...2007 4(5?)-caps + 1-cap (sub) 2-tries 8-points
- James "Jimmy" Thompson won caps for England while at Featherstone Rovers in 1970 against France, in 1975 against Australia, Australia, in 1977 against Wales, while at Bradford Northern in 1978 against France (sub), Wales (sub), and won caps for Great Britain while at Featherstone Rovers in 1970 against Australia (2 matches), New Zealand (2 matches), Australia (2 matches), France, New Zealand, in 1971 against France, France (sub), in 1974 against Australia (3 matches), New Zealand (3 matches), in 1977 against France, New Zealand, Australia (2 matches), while at Bradford Northern in 1978 against Australia (World Cup in 1970 4-caps)
- Kenneth "Ken" Traill won caps for England while at Bradford Northern in 1949 against France, in 1953 against Wales, Other Nationalities, in 1955 against Other Nationalities, and won caps for Great Britain while at Bradford Northern in 1950 against New Zealand (2 matches), in 1951 against New Zealand, in 1952 against Australia (3 matches), in 1954 against Australia, New Zealand
- Emlyn Walters won caps for Wales while at Bradford Northern 1947...1948 5-caps
- Edward "Ted" Ward won caps for Great Britain while at Bradford Northern in 1947 against New Zealand (3 matches), in 1950 against New Zealand (2 matches), and in 1951 against New Zealand (3 matches)
- Ernest Ward won caps for England while at Bradford Northern in 1941 against Wales, in 1945 against Wales (2 matches), in 1946 against France (2 matches), Wales (2 matches), in 1947 against France, Wales, in 1948 against France (2 matches), in 1949 against Wales, France (2 matches), in 1950 against Wales (2 matches), France, in 1952 against Other Nationalities (2 matches), Wales, and won caps for Great Britain while at Bradford Northern in 1946 against Australia (3 matches), New Zealand, in 1947 against New Zealand (2 matches), in 1948 against Australia (3 matches), in 1950 against Australia (3 matches), New Zealand (2 matches), in 1951 against New Zealand (3 matches), in 1952 against Australia (3 matches)
- Frank Whitcombe won caps for Wales while at Broughton Rangers, and Bradford Northern 1938...1948 14-caps, and won caps for Great Britain while at Bradford Northern in 1946 against Australia (2 matches)
- Thomas "Tom"/"Tommy" Winnard won caps for England while at Bradford Northern in 1937 against France
- Harold Young won caps for England while at Bradford Northern in 1928 against Wales, while at Huddersfield in 1929 against Other Nationalities, in 1930 against Other Nationalities, in 1931 against Wales, and won caps for Great Britain while at Huddersfield in 1929-30 against Australia
