= History of the Bradford Bulls =

The History of the Bradford Bulls stretches back from their former incarnation as Bradford F.C. in 1863 to 2017.

== 1863–1879 ==
The Bradford Football Club was formed in 1863 by a group mostly made up of ex-Bramham College students. In their early years, the club played a mixture of association football rules and what would become rugby union laws. Bradford's home ground was Great Horton Road, then home of Bradford Cricket Club.

Bradford's earliest recorded match against another club was home and away games against Leeds Clarence in 1866–7, such inter-club matches continued to be rare in Bradford's early years with only nine inter-club games in 1871-2 and ten a season later.

Due to damage to the cricket square, Bradford had to leave Great Horton Road and would play at a variety of grounds; first a field on Laisteridge Lane in 1870 and then, at the start of 1871, Peel Park. Once again Bradford moved to North Park Road in Manningham in the summer of 1871 and then to a ground in Girlington in 1872 where they stayed for the next two years. Bradford then moved to a field near the Stansfield Arms in Apperley Bridge where they stayed until the move to Park Avenue.

Under the captaincy of H.W.T. Garnett, Bradford went through the whole 1874–5 season, not only undefeated, but without having even a single point scored against them. A Yorkshire Rugby Union was formed in 1874 and they introduced a Yorkshire Cup competition in 1876.

== Park Avenue years 1880–1895 ==
Bradford Football Club and Bradford Cricket Club agreed to form the Bradford Cricket, Athletic and Football Club and moved together to Park Avenue in 1880. Bradford played their first rugby match there on 25 September 1880 against Bradford Rangers.

Bradford achieved their first major success by winning the Yorkshire Cup in 1884.

After the 1890–91 season, Bradford along with other Yorkshire Senior clubs Batley, Brighouse, Dewsbury, Halifax, Huddersfield, Hull, Hunslet, Leeds, Liversedge, Manningham and Wakefield decided that they wanted their own county league starting in 1891 along the lines of a similar competition that had been played in Lancashire. The clubs wanted full control of the league but the Yorkshire Rugby Football Union would not sanction the competition as it meant giving up control of rugby football to the senior clubs.

In 1895, along with cross-town neighbours Manningham F.C., Bradford was among 22 clubs to secede from the Rugby Football Union after a historic meeting at the George Hotel in Huddersfield, in response to a dispute over "broken time" payments to players. These 22 clubs formed the Northern Rugby Union. Bradford were reluctant to join but had large debts and faced the loss of lucrative fixtures against local rivals.

Bradford experimented with an association football section in 1895 but this struggled to compete with the popularity of rugby and the section was closed down in 1899. The first game of association football played at Park Avenue had been an exhibition match between Blackburn Rovers and a Blackburn District XI in 1882. Between 1895 and 1899, Bradford also entered the West Yorkshire and Yorkshire leagues, the FA Amateur Cup and the FA Cup.

== Northern Union and the Great Betrayal 1896–1907 ==
Bradford were initially successful in the new world of professional rugby and reached the 1898 Challenge Cup Final, before losing 7–0 to Batley at Leeds. Bradford also won the Yorkshire Senior Competition in 1899–1900 and again in 1900–01. In 1903–04, Bradford finished level on points with Salford at the top of the league and then won the resulting play-off, 5–0.

Neighbouring club Manningham ran into financial difficulties and, despite a summer archery contest that generated enough money to ensure their survival, its members were persuaded to change to association football. The club was invited to join the Football League in 1903, in an attempt to introduce football to the rugby-dominated region, and the newly renamed Bradford City AFC was voted into full membership of the Second Division without playing a game, having a team or being able to guarantee a ground.

Bradford won the first division championship in 1904. In 1905–06, Bradford's rugby team beat Salford 5–0 to win the Challenge Cup and were runners-up in the Championship. The following season winning the Yorkshire Cup 8–5 against Hull Kingston Rovers.

That same year, the Northern Union made changes to the game's laws reducing teams from 15 to 13-a-side later and the play-the-ball was introduced after a tackle. Bradford did not adapt well to these new laws and by late December, the club had slid to 24th place out of 27 and lost £500. Gates were several thousand lower than those of the newly formed Bradford City FC. In desperation, the Bradford applied for readmission to the Rugby Football Union which was granted in March 1907 provided that all professional players were excluded from the club.

A meeting was called of the club members on 15 April 1907 to decide the club's future. An initial vote appeared to favour continuing in the Northern Union by a majority of one with association football in third, the second vote had a majority in favour of the RFU's offer following a recount but the chairman, A. H. Briggs, used his influence to swing the committee behind association football. This act, sometimes referred to as "The Great Betrayal", led to Bradford becoming a football club, Bradford Park Avenue A.F.C.

Northern Union supporters formed a new club to take the available place in the Northern Union under the name of Bradford Rugby F.C. on 24 May 1907. As a goodwill gesture, Bradford Park Avenue passed all their old playing kit, balls and posts to the new club. The majority of players from 1906 to 1907 went on to play for the new club, helped in no small part by the Northern Union placing an embargo on other clubs signing players from the old Bradford club. The club extended their name to Bradford Northern R.F.C. in September 1907 to emphasize that Northern Union football was still being played in Bradford. Bradford Northern's first home was Greenfield Athletic Ground. Northern lost to Huddersfield in the first match on 7 September watched by 7,000 spectators.

== Bradford Northern 1908–1994 ==
Unhappy with facilities at Greenfield Athletic Ground, Bradford Northern moved to Birch Lane in 1908. At times the club had to hire Valley Parade as the capacity at Birch Lane was insufficient for large matches.

Bradford council offered Bradford a site for a new stadium between Rooley Lane and Mayo Avenue in 1927. However the RFL said the site was too small and the club kept on lookingOn 20 June 1933, Bradford Northern signed a ten-year lease with Bradford council for a former quarry being used as a waste dump at Odsal Top. It was turned into the biggest stadium outside Wembley. The Bradford Northern team played its first match there on 1 September 1934.

=== 1940s ===
Success came in the 1940s with a number of cup wins: the Yorkshire cup in 1940–1, 1942–3, 1944–5, 1945–6, 1948–9 and 1949–50; and the Challenge cup 1943–4, 1946–7 and 1948–9. In the championship Bradford found it difficult to win either before the war or after despite being runners up in 1942-3 and 1947–8. The 1947-8 Challenge Cup final was notable as it was the first rugby league match to be attended by the reigning monarch, King George VI, who presented the trophy. Frank Whitcombe becomes the first player to win the Lance Todd trophy on the losing side. It was also the first televised rugby league match as it was broadcast to the Midlands. However Bradford lost 8–3 to Wigan. The 1949 Challenge Cup final was sold out for first time as 95,050 spectators saw Bradford beat Halifax.

=== 1950s ===
In 1951–52, Bradford were runners-up in the league but beat New Zealand at Odsal in the first floodlit football match of any code in the North of England. In 1953, a crowd of 69,429 watched Bradford play Huddersfield in the Challenge Cup third round. This was Northern's highest ever attendance. Northern also won the Yorkshire Cup final 7–2 against Hull. Bradford Northern and Leigh were the first rugby league clubs to stage matches on a Sunday in December 1954, although there was opposition from the Sunday Observance lobby.

=== 1960s ===
Bradford Northern's support declined rapidly in the 1963 season, attracting a record low crowd of 324 against Barrow. Northern went out of business on 10 December 1963 having played just 13 matches; winning 1 and losing 12, scoring 109 points and conceding 284. In 1964, the Bradford Northern club reformed through the efforts of such people as Trevor Foster and Joe Phillips and were accepted back into the Rugby League. The reformed club won its first cup in 1965–66 by beating Hunslet 17–8 in the final of the Yorkshire Cup.

=== 1970s ===
In 1972-3 Bradford lost the Challenge Cup final against Featherstone 33–14. In 1973–74 Bradford won the Second Division Championship and were promoted back to the First Division. During this season Keith Mumby made his debut, becoming the Bradford's youngest player at only 16 years of age, scoring 12 goals and a try in a match against Doncaster. He went on to make a record 576 appearances for the club. In 1974–75 Bradford won the Regal Trophy 3–2 against Widnes. Peter Fox joined Bradford as coach for the first time in 1977–78. Bradford won the Premiership final 17–8 against Widnes and were also Championship runners-up. In 1978–79, Bradford appeared in another Premiership final, this time losing 24–2 to Leeds. A year later Bradford won the Championship and Regal Trophy, Peter Fox winning the award for Coach of the Year. In 1980–81 the club made it back to back championships.

=== 1980s ===
In 1981–82 Bradford lost the Yorkshire Cup final 18–7 against Castleford and lost again in 1982–83, this time 18–7 against Hull. Keith Mumby won the award for First Division Player of the Year while Brian Noble won the Young Player award. In 1985 Ellery Hanley left Northern to join Wigan for a then record transfer deal, worth £80,000 and a player exchange involving Steve Donlan and Phil Ford. In 1987-8 Bradford won the Yorkshire Cup final replay against Castleford 11–2 after drawing 12–12. In 1989–90 Bradford beat Featherstone 20–14 in the Yorkshire Cup final. Bradford lost the Regal Trophy against Warrington 12–2 in 1990–91. In 1993–4, the last but two Championship before Super League, Bradford finished as runners-up behind Wigan on points difference.

== The Super League era ==
=== The Super League era – 1996 ===
In April 1995, the Rugby League announced the formation of the Super League. The Super League consisted of 10 clubs from the existing First Division (including Bradford Bulls) plus London Broncos from the Second Division, and new club Paris Saint-Germain.

Name Change and start of the Bulls The club's name was changed from Bradford Northern to Bradford Bulls and a new logo was adopted. Australian Brian Smith was appointed coach and later Chief Executive. Bradford lost the 1996 Challenge Cup final 40–32 to St Helens, Robbie Paul became the first player to score a hat-trick in the final, a performance that won him the Lance Todd Trophy. Robbie also won the Super League Player of the Year.

In September 1996, Brian Smith decided to return to Australia as coach of Parramatta Eels and assistant coach Matthew Elliot took over. Bradford Bulls finished the season as the best supported team in Super League with an average attendance in excess of 10,000.

=== Champions-1997 ===
Bradford won the 1997 Super League title with a record run of 20 successive victories from the start of the season. The Bulls were also Challenge Cup runners-up for a second season, losing 32–22 to St Helens. James Lowes was the Super League Player of the Season while Matthew Elliot was chosen as Super League Coach of the Season. Bradford was once again the best supported club, with an average of over 15,000.

=== On the Road – 1998 ===
In 1998, as part of rugby league's "on the road" scheme the Bradford Bulls played London Broncos at Tynecastle in Edinburgh in front of over 7,000 fans. 1998 was a disappointing season for Bradford, finishing fifth in Super League. The Bulls remained the best-supported club, however, with an average attendance in excess of 13,000. Leon Pryce beat Keith Mumby's record in becoming the youngest player ever to appear for the club.

=== So Close – 1999 ===
In 1999 Bradford signed New Zealand international Henry Paul from Wigan Warriors who linked up with brother Robbie Paul for the first time at professional club level. The club achieved record season ticket sales, and set a new scoring record as the Bulls thrashed Workington Town 92–0 in the fourth round of the Challenge Cup at Odsal. The Bulls won a Minor Premiership in Super League IV; staying undefeated at Odsal. The final home game saw the Bulls smash the Super League attendance record with 24,020 fans watching the 19–18 defeat of Leeds Rhinos. A rugby league record 50,717 fans at Old Trafford saw the Bulls lose the 1999 Super League Grand Final 8–6 to St Helens. Henry Paul won the Harry Sunderland Trophy as man of the match.

== The millennium ==
=== Flower of Scotland – 2000 ===
The Bulls won the 2000 Challenge Cup with a 24–18 against local rivals Leeds Rhinos at the Scottish Rugby Union's Murrayfield Stadium, the first time that the final had been held in Scotland. Henry Paul won the Lance Todd Trophy as man of the match.

=== Glory Days-2001 ===
Brian Noble was appointed Bradford head coach in 2001 and the club took up residence at Valley Parade, the home of Bradford City, to allow for the redevelopment of Odsal Stadium. Reaching the Challenge Cup final, held at Twickenham, the team suffered a 13–6 defeat by St Helens. On 3 May, in a home match against Warrington, Henry Paul set a new World Record for consecutive goal kicks (35). The Bulls finished the regular season as Minor Premiers and on 13 October at Old Trafford, a new Super League Grand Final record attendance of 60,164 turned up and the Bulls crushed Wigan Warriors 37–6 to claim the title. Michael Withers scored a hat-trick of tries and was awarded the Harry Sunderland Trophy as Man of the Match.

=== World beaters- 2002 ===
The Bulls were crowned World Club Champions on 1 February 2002 after defeating Australian Premiers Newcastle Knights 41–26 in front of a crowd of 21,113 at Huddersfield's McAlpine Stadium. James Lowes was named as Man of the Match and Paul Deacon kicked eight goals from nine attempts plus a drop goal for a total of 17 points in the match, an individual scoring record for this competition. Bradford again lost the Super League Grand Final to St Helens this time losing 19–18 in the last minute of the game.

=== Tre-BULL Champions -2003 ===
The first match played following the clubs' return to Odsal was against Yorkshire rivals Wakefield Trinity Wildcats on Sunday 9 March 2003 and attracted an attendance of 20,283. Bradford Bulls won the game 22–10. Bradford Bulls became the first club to win the Challenge Cup and Super League Grand Final in the same season in 2003. The team travelled to Cardiff to beat the Leeds Rhinos at the Millennium Stadium 22–20 in front of 71,212 fans, then went on to lift the League Leaders Shield for finishing top of the Super League after 28 rounds, before defeating Leeds Rhinos again, for the fifth time in the season, in the Qualifying Semi Final play-off to reach the Tetley's Rugby Super League Grand Final. The Bulls claimed the Super League title with victory over Wigan Warriors before a record, sell-out crowd of 65,537 at Old Trafford, Manchester.

=== World Champions – 2004 ===
Bradford Bulls regained the World Club Challenge in 2004 by beating the NRL champions Penrith Panthers 22–4 at the McAlpine Stadium in Huddersfield. They also beat Leeds Rhinos in the play-offs to reach the Grand Final, only to meet their arch-rivals two weeks later at Old Trafford in front of a record grand final crowd of 67,000. This time Bradford were beaten by Leeds 16–8. 2004 was also a superb year for ‘The Volcano’ Lesley Vainikolo as he smashed the Super League try scoring record with a total of 37 tries from 26 appearances. This achievement started in the first round of the regular Super League season as he crossed the try line on five separate occasions against Wigan Warriors to equal the record for the total number of tries in a Super League game.

=== History Makers – 2005 ===
After a difficult start to the 2005 season, The Bulls went on a 12 match unbeaten run and managed to win the Super League title from third place by beating Leeds Rhinos at Old Trafford.

=== New Era – 2006 ===
The Bulls started the 2006 season by beating Wests Tigers 30–10 in the World Club Challenge Match at the Galpharm Stadium. This was their third such win in four years. Coach Brian Noble left Bradford to coach relegation threatened Wigan Warriors on 20 April 2006, Steve McNamara took over as head coach. Stuart Fielden followed Noble, moving to Wigan for a record fee of £450,000. McNamara's finest hour so far may have been the 20–18 defeat of St Helens at Odsal in June, which proved to be Fielden's last match for the Bulls. Bradford Bulls did not reach the Grand Final for the 1st time in 6 years, going out to Hull F.C. in the Final Eliminator

== Centenary season – 2007 ==
In 2007, Bradford Northern/Bulls were celebrating the centennial of the club, it being 100 years since the formation of Bradford Northern. Their Carnegie Challenge Cup campaign began with a home tie against National League side Castleford in the 4th round. After a tense match, Bradford ran out 24–16 winners. Bradford then faced a trip to Belle Vue to face fellow Super League club Wakefield Trinity in the 5th Round. On 30 April 2007, Steve McNamara was appointed Great Britain assistant coach to Tony Smith.

On 6 May 2007, Bradford Bulls were involved in a controversial situation. During the Millennium Magic weekend, two decisions from referee Steve Ganson which gave the game in the dying seconds to Leeds who won 38–42. After the match Ganson admitted having made mistakes, which led to a call from Bradford Bulls Chairman Peter Hood for the points to be awarded to Bradford Bulls. In May 2007 one of the greatest wingers to play for the Bulls Lesley Vainikolo joined Gloucester RFC, Bulls signed 24-year-old Tame Tupou from 2006 NRL champions Brisbane Broncos as Les's replacement.

The Bulls faced a tough schedule in June and July, they beat Hull F.C. 34–8 in round 17, then went on to beat Leeds 38–14 which was Lesley Vainikolos last game with the Bulls, then in round 19 they played Wigan at JJB score was 25–18 to Wigan and then the Bulls went to beat St. Helens 10–4 in round 20 at Grattan Stadium. These games went a long way to proving whether they had the things to become champions at the end of the season. The Bulls were docked two Super League competition points when an independent panel found that the club had breached the salary cap by four per cent. The points deduction took immediate effect and applied to the 2007 season and therefore the current engage Super League competition table. The Bulls reached the semi of Challenge cup in July 2007 but were defeated by St Helens.

To celebrate their centennial season, T & A Bradford's local paper were commissioning a team of the century (see below for details). Bradford Bulls will play Leeds in an all star match of touch rugby, Deryk Fox, Karl Fairbank, James Lowes etc. will turn out for the Bulls while the likes of Gary Schofield, Lee Crookes and Dave Heron etc. will turn out for the Rhinos; the game will be played before Round 25 game between Bradford Bulls and Leeds.

There was a team of the century team announced in August 2007.

== 2012–2017: Administrations, relegation and liquidation ==
In March 2012 the club announced that it was in financial difficulties and needed £1 million to keep the club afloat. A public appeal saw a lot of new funds pour in from supporters, but following the issue of a winding up petition from HMRC for unpaid taxes the holding company for the club was forced to go into administration on 26 June 2012. The Rugby Football League announced that had the company been wound up then the team would be allowed to complete their fixtures for the 2012 Super League season under the possible ownership of a supporters trust. On 2 July 2012, the club's administrator, Brendan Guilfoyle, made sixteen members of staff, including the coach Mick Potter and chief executive Ryan Duckett, redundant, but announced that the club would attempt to fulfill its fixtures. Mick Potter continued as an unpaid coach until the end of the season. On 31 August 2012 a bid for the club from a local consortium, headed by Braford businessman Omar Khan, was accepted by the administrator and was ratified by the RFL in early September. Days later the RFL also granted the new owners a one-year probationary licence enabling the club to compete in Super League XVIII in 2013.

Francis Cummins was appointed as head coach of the Bulls in September 2012. During the 2012/13 season the Bulls appointed Dr Allan Johnston (psychiatrist) to the backroom staff to support the players wellbeing and performance. This appointment was thought to be the first of its kind in Rugby League. In late December 2013 it was announced that chairman Mark Moore and directors Ian Watt and Andrew Calvert had resigned.

In 2014, relegation was reintroduced to the Super League with two teams being relegated. Bradford were deducted 6 points for entering administration early on in the season and the Bulls were relegated from the top division of rugby league in Britain for the first time in 40 years. Francis Cummins was sacked around the time of relegation and replaced by James Lowes and won most of their remaining games.

Bradford began their first Championship campaign in 40 years against Leigh away where they narrowly lost the game. By the end of the regular season they entered the Super 8s finishing second. In the Qualifiers Bradford failed to make the top three for automatic entry to Super League for 2016, finishing 5th which meant a trip to Wakefield to play them in the first ever Million Pound Game. Bradford would lose 24–16, condemning them to a second year in the Championship.

In preparation for the 2016 season, Bradford completed the signings of several experienced players, such as Centre Kris Welham from Super League side Hull Kingston Rovers, as well as Oscar Thomas, Mitch Clark, Johnny Campbell, Jonathan Walker and Kurt Haggerty from London Broncos, Doncaster, Batley and Leigh. Bradford started the season strongly, with a win over fellow promotion hopefuls Featherstone Rovers by 22–12. Omari Caro scored a hat-trick in this match. This was followed up by away wins at Whitehaven and Swinton. Bradfords season was ultimately disappointing with failure to reach The Qualifiers, this meant Bradford would miss out on a chance of promotion

On 14 November 2016, Bradford Bulls were placed in administration for the third time since 2012. On 16 November, the Rugby Football League (RFL) cancelled Bradford's membership, making their future uncertain. In the ensuing weeks several bids to buy the club were made but despite one bid being acceptable to the RFL, none were accepted by the administrator and the club went into liquidation on 3 January 2017. Following liquidation the RFL issued a statement saying:

While a number of alternatives were considered the Board was most mindful of the planning already undertaken by all other clubs in the competition structure, the season tickets already purchased and the players and staff who will now be seeking employment in and around the sport in 2017. Accordingly the Board has agreed that the wider interests of the sport is best satisfied if it offers a place in the Kingstone Press Championship to any new club in Bradford and that such a club start the 2017 season on minus 12 points. The RFL believes that Rugby League needs Bradford and that Bradford deserves a strong and stable professional club and will work with all interested parties to deliver that outcome.
