= 1997 Rugby League Divisional Premiership =

1997 Divisional Premiership Trophy
- Structure: National knockout championship
- Teams: 20
- Winners: Huddersfield Giants
- Runners-up: Hull Sharks

The 1997 Rugby League Divisional Premiership was the 11th and final end of season Rugby League Divisional Premiership competition and the second in the Super League era. Following this season, the competition was replaced by a play-off system which would be used to decide the second Division championship and promotion to the Super League.

The competition was completely restructured for the 1997 season. With the exception of the bottom two Division Two clubs, Doncaster Dragons and Prescot Panthers, it was expanded to include all Division One and Division Two clubs. A group stage was added, which consisted of four pools of five teams based on region, although some team were assigned to another pool to keep the group sizes even (Yorkshire-based Keighley Cougars were placed in the Lancashire pool, and Lancashire Lynx competed in the Cumbrian group). The top two teams in each group then progressed to the knockout stage of the competition.

The winners were Huddersfield Giants.

== Regional pools ==
=== Cumbria ===
Pos	Team	Pld	W	D	L	PF	PA	PD	Pts	Qualification
1	Whitehaven Warriors	8	8	0	0	301	96	+205	16	Qualification for knockout phase
2	Workington Town	8	5	0	3	162	187	−25	10	Qualification for knockout phase
3	Carlisle Border Raiders	8	3	0	5	167	248	−81	6	
4	Barrow Braves	8	2	0	6	219	228	−9	4	
5	Lancashire Lynx	8	2	0	6	157	247	−90	4	

Rules for classification: 1) Points; 2) Points difference; 3) Number of points scored;

=== Lancashire ===
Pos	Team	Pld	W	D	L	PF	PA	PD	Pts	Qualification
1	Keighley Cougars	8	6	0	2	214	141	+73	12	Qualification for knockout phase
2	Leigh Centurions	8	6	0	2	198	179	+19	12	Qualification for knockout phase
3	Swinton Lions	8	5	0	3	218	156	+62	10	
4	Widnes Vikings	8	2	1	5	178	175	+3	5	
5	Rochdale Hornets	8	0	1	7	140	297	−157	1	

Rules for classification: 1) Points; 2) Points difference; 3) Number of points scored;

=== East Yorkshire ===
Pos	Team	Pld	W	D	L	PF	PA	PD	Pts	Qualification
1	Hull	8	6	0	2	288	104	+184	12	Qualification for knockout phase
2	Featherstone Rovers	8	5	0	3	228	153	+75	10	Qualification for knockout phase
3	Hull Kingston Rovers	8	5	0	3	188	130	+58	10	
4	Wakefield Trinity	8	3	0	5	134	198	−64	6	
5	York	8	1	0	7	92	345	−253	2	

Rules for classification: 1) Points; 2) Points difference; 3) Number of points scored;

=== West Yorkshire ===
Pos	Team	Pld	W	D	L	PF	PA	PD	Pts	Qualification
1	Huddersfield Giants	8	8	0	0	308	92	+216	16	Qualification for knockout phase
2	Hunslet Hawks	8	5	0	3	174	173	+1	10	Qualification for knockout phase
3	Dewsbury Rams	8	4	0	4	179	131	+48	8	
4	Batley Bulldogs	8	2	0	6	150	196	−46	4	
5	Bramley	8	1	0	7	114	333	−219	2	

Rules for classification: 1) Points; 2) Points difference; 3) Number of points scored;

== Quarter-finals ==
Date	Team one	Score	Team two
14 September 1997	Huddersfield Giants	37–12	Featherstone Rovers
14 September 1997	Hull Sharks	52–10	Hunslet Hawks
14 September 1997	Leigh Centurions	25–48	Whitehaven Warriors
14 September 1997	Workington Town	10–36	Keighley Cougars

== Semi-finals ==
Date	Team one	Score	Team two
21 September 1997	Hull Sharks	45–18	Whitehaven
21 September 1997	Keighley Cougars	8–18	Huddersfield Giants

== Final ==
28 September 1997

Huddersfield Giants	18 – 0	Hull Sharks
Tries: Davys, Bunyan, Cheetham; Goals: Cook (3)	Report

Old Trafford, Manchester
Referee: John Connolly (Wigan)
Player of the Match: Craig Weston

1	Phil Veivers (c)
2	Paul Cook
3	James Bunyan
4	Dean Hanger
5	Andy Cheetham
6	Craig Weston
7	Ali Davys
8	Neil Harmon
9	Danny Russell
10	Nick Fozzard
11	Tony Bowes
12	Dave King
13	Matt Sturm
Substitutions:
14	Steve Booth
15	Joe Berry
16	Paul Dixon
17	Basil Richards
Coach:
Steve Ferres

1	Steve Holmes
2	Graeme Hallas
3	Kevin Gray
4	Tevita Vaikona
5	Mark Johnson
6	Rob Nolan
7	Mark Hewitt
8	Richard Wilson
9	Mike Dixon
10	Andy Ireland
11	David Boyd (c)
12	Matt Schultz
13	Brad Hepi
Substitutions:
14	Rob Danby
15	Logan Campbell
16	Chico Jackson
17	Maea David
Coach:
Peter Walsh

== See also ==
- 1997 RFL Division One
- 1997 RFL Division Two
