= 1999 Super League Grand Final =

Bradford Bulls	St. Helens
6	8
	1	2	Total
BRA	6	0	6
ST H	2	6	8
- Date: 9 October 1999
- Stadium: Old Trafford
- Location: (England) Manchester
- Harry Sunderland Trophy: (New Zealand) Henry Paul ( Bradford)
- Referee: Stuart Cummings
- Attendance: 50,717

Broadcast partners
- Broadcasters: Sky Sports
- Commentators: Eddie Hemmings; Mike Stephenson

The 1999 Super League Grand Final was the second official grand final conclusive and championship-deciding game of the Super League IV season. The match was played between St. Helens and Bradford Bulls on Saturday 9 October 1999, at Old Trafford.

== Background ==
Super League IV retained the top five play off after the success of the previous years grand final. The league was expanded to 14 teams with Wakefield Trinity Wildcats and Gateshead Thunder both made their debuts in Super League although Gateshead Thunder and Sheffield Eagles both left the league after merging with Hull FC and Huddersfield Giants respectively. Bradford Bulls finished as League Leaders for the first time since they finished top in Super League II as Champions.

	Team	Pld	W	D	L	PF	PA	PD	Pts
1	Bradford Bulls	30	25	1	4	897	445	+452	51
2	St. Helens	30	23	0	7	1034	561	+473	46

=== Route to the Final ===
==== Bradford Bulls ====
By finishing first in the regular season, Bradford automatically qualified for the play-off semi-final. They were drawn at home to St Helens and in a one-sided game, they brushed St Helens aside 40–4 to qualify for the Grand Final.

==== St Helens ====
The play-off system in use only gave the league leaders a bye to the semi-finals. St Helens had finished second so had to play a qualifying play-off first. Drawn at home to Leeds Rhinos St Helens won 38–14 to go through to the semi-final. This was an away fixture to Bradford where they were beaten 40–4. However this loss did not end their season. The losers of the qualifying semi-final got another chance by playing the winners of the other semi-final in a final eliminator. Therefore Saints' third play-off game was a home tie against Castleford Tigers where they won through 36–6.

St Helens
Round	Opposition	Score
Qualifying Play-off	Leeds Rhinos (H)	38-14
Qualifying Semi-Final	Bradford Bulls (A)	40-4
Final Eliminator	Castleford Tigers (H)	36-6
Key: (H) = Home venue; (A) = Away venue.

== Match details ==
9 October 1999

Bradford Bulls	6 - 8	St. Helens
Tries: Henry Paul; Goals: Henry Paul	Report	Tries: Kevin Iro; Goals: Sean Long (2)

Old Trafford, Manchester
Attendance: 50,717
Referee: Stuart Cummings (Widnes)

Bradford Bulls		Position	St Helens	
	(England) Stuart Spruce	Fullback		(England) Paul Atcheson
	(Tonga) Tevita Vaikona	Winger		(England) Chris Smith
	(England) Scott Naylor	Centre		(New Zealand) Kevin Iro
	(Ireland) Michael Withers	Centre		(England) Paul Newlove
5	(England) Leon Pryce	Winger		(England) Anthony Sullivan
6	(New Zealand) Robbie Paul	Stand Off	6	(England) Paul Sculthorpe
7	(New Zealand) Henry Paul	Scrum half	7	(England) Tommy Martyn
	(England) Paul Anderson	Prop		(New Zealand) Apollo Perelini
9	(England) James Lowes	Hooker	9	(England) Keiron Cunningham
	(England) Stuart Fielden	Prop		(Australia) Julian O'Neill
	(Australia) David Boyle	2nd Row		(Samoa) Fereti Tuilagi
	(England) Bernard Dwyer	2nd Row		(England) Sonny Nickle
13	(England) Steve McNamara	Loose forward	13	(England) Chris Joynt
	(England) Paul Deacon	Interchange		(England) Paul Wellens
	(England) Nathan McAvoy	Interchange		(England) Sean Long
	(England) Mike Forshaw	Interchange		(New Zealand) Sean Hoppe
	(England) Brian McDermott	Interchange		(Samoa) Vila Matautia
	(Australia) Matthew Elliott	Coach		(England) Ellery Hanley
