= Basil Richards =

English rugby league footballer

Personal information
- Born: 9 July 1965 (age 60) Bradford, England

Playing information
- Position: Prop, Second-row
Club
Years	Team	Pld	T	G	FG	P
1989–93	Warrington	11+31	4	0	0	16
1993–99	Huddersfield	115+25	19	0	0	76
2000	Doncaster	14+11	0	0	0	0
	Total	207	23	0	0	92
- Source: As of 17 May 2023

Basil Richards (born 9 July 1965) is a former professional English rugby league footballer who played in the 1980s, 1990s and 2000s, and coached in the 2000s and 2010s. He played at club level for Queensbury ARLFC (in Bradford), Warrington, the Huddersfield Giants and Doncaster, as a prop, or second-row, and coached at representative level for England (Youth), and at club level for Bradford Bulls (Assistant), and Queensbury ARLFC.

== Background ==
Basil Richards was born in Bradford, West Riding of Yorkshire, England.

== Playing career ==
Basil Richards signed for Warrington as a junior, he made his début for Warrington on Sunday 8 January 1989, and he played his last match for Warrington on Sunday 25 April 1993, and played 42 matches. He signed with Huddersfield for the 1993-94 season, and remained with the club until 1999, playing in 1998's Super League III, and 1999's IV.

Richards later played for Doncaster.

== Coaching career ==
After retirement Richards worked for the Kirklees Council as part of their sports development team and took up coaching, working part-time with the Bradford Bulls, and as coach of Queensbury ARLFC. He also worked with English national youth sides.

He was appointed Bradford Bull's assistant coach in 2006 by Steve McNamara. Richards coached the Bradford Bulls Senior Academy side. He was released by the club in early 2010 after Bradford suffered poor form.

== Personal life ==
His brother, Craig Richards, played for the Bradford Bulls. His cousin, Dean Richards, played football for Bradford City.
