= Joe Berry (rugby league) =

Scotland international rugby league footballer

Personal information
- Full name: Joseph Berry
- Born: 7 May 1974 (age 50); Bradford, West Yorkshire, England

Playing information
- Position: Prop, Second-row
Club
| Years | Team | Pld | T | G | FG | P |
|---|---|---|---|---|---|---|
| 1994–96 | Keighley Cougars |
| 1997–99 | Huddersfield Giants |
| 2000–01 | Doncaster Dragons | 32 | 4 | 0 | 0 | 16 |
| 2001–02 | Rochdale Hornets |
| 2003–05 | Batley Bulldogs |
| | Total | 32 | 4 | 0 | 0 | 16 |
Representative
| Years | Team | Pld | T | G | FG | P |
| 1998–03 | Scotland | 7 | 0 | 0 | 0 | 0 |

Joseph Berry (born 7 May 1974) is a coach and former Scotland international rugby league footballer who played as a prop or second-row in the 1990s and 2000s. He played at club level for Dudley Hill (in Bradford), Keighley Cougars, Huddersfield Giants, Doncaster Dragons, Rochdale Hornets and the Batley Bulldogs. He has been Dewsbury Celtic ARLFC Under-15s assistant coach since June 2016.

== Background ==
Joe Berry was born in Bradford, West Riding of Yorkshire, England.

== Playing career ==
Joe Berry won four caps (plus three as a substitute) for Scotland in 1998–2003 while at Huddersfield Giants, Doncaster, Rochdale Hornets, and Batley Bulldogs.
