= Davide Longo =

English rugby league footballer and RL administrator

Personal information
- Full name: Davide Longo
- Born: 9 December 1975 (age 50) Wakefield, England

Playing information
- Position: Fullback, Centre, Stand-off
Club
Years	Team	Pld	T	G	FG	P
1993–95	Dewsbury Rams	55	39		4
1995–96	Bradford Bulls	12	4	0	0	16
1997–98	Swinton Lions	28	14	0	2	58
1998–99	Keighley Cougars	22	5	2	2	26
2001	Batley Bulldogs	21	7	0	0	28
2002	Dewsbury Rams	19	2	6	0	20
2004	Hunslet Hawks	4	1	0	0	0
	Total	161	72	8	8	148

Davide Longo (born 9 December 1975) is an English former professional rugby league footballer who started playing Rugby League for Stanley Rangers ARLFC, playing in the 1980s, 1990s and 2000s, and as of 2019 he was the chief executive officer of Featherstone Rovers. He played at club level for Dewsbury Rams (two spells), Bradford Bulls, Swinton Lions, Keighley Cougars and Batley Bulldogs, as a fullback, centre, or stand-off. Davide Longo left Featherstone Rovers in March 2021 to take on a new role with Bradford City AFC as Commercial Director then promoted to General Manager in July 2025

== Background ==
Davide Longo was born in Wakefield, West Yorkshire, England. His father was born in Alessandria Della Rocca, Agrigento. Sicily allowing him dual citizenship status.

== International honours ==
Davide Longo represented Great Britain (Academy) against France (Academy) playing in two international matches at Hilton Park, Leigh and Carcasonne, Southern France.

== Super League ==
Davide Longo signed for Bradford Bulls on 15 December 1995 and made his debut on Wednesday 20 December 1995 against Warrington at Wilderspool Stadium. Davide Longo made his Super League debut for Bradford Bulls on 8 April 1996 against London Broncos at Odsal Stadium.

== Challenge Cup ==
Davide Longo was part of the Bradford Bulls 1996 Challenge Cup Final squad. He scored a hat-trick of tries against Batley on 4 February 1996 and featured in every round in games against Leigh Centurions, Wakefield Trinity and Leeds.
