= Gary Christie =

Scotland international rugby league footballer

Personal information
- Full name: Gary Christie
- Born: 23 January 1972 (age 53)

Playing information
- Position: Wing
Club
| Years | Team | Pld | T | G | FG | P |
|---|---|---|---|---|---|---|
| 1991–93 | Oldham | 34 | 17 | 0 | 0 | 68 |
| 1993–94 | Wakefield Trinity | 29 | 4 | 0 | 0 | 16 |
| 1994–97 | Bradford Bulls | 46 | 19 | 0 | 0 | 76 |
| | Total | 109 | 40 | 0 | 0 | 160 |
Representative
| Years | Team | Pld | T | G | FG | P |
| 1993 | Great Britain U-21 | 1 | 1 | 0 | 0 | 4 |
| 1997 | Scotland | 1 | 1 | 0 | 0 | 4 |

Gary Christie (born 23 January 1972) is a former professional rugby league footballer who played at representative level for Scotland, and at club level for Oldham, Wakefield Trinity and the Bradford Bulls, as a wing.

At the end of the 1997 season, he switched codes to rugby union to play for Widnes RUFC.
