= Kevin Crouthers =

English rugby league footballer

Personal information
- Full name: Kevin Crouthers
- Born: 3 January 1976 (age 50)

Playing information
- Height: 6 ft 2 in (1.88 m)
- Position: Fullback, Wing, Centre, Loose forward
Club
Years	Team	Pld	T	G	FG	P
1994–97	Dewsbury Rams	41	11	0	1	45
1997–98	Bradford Bulls	15	2	0	0	8
1998(loan)	→ Keighley Cougars	5	0	0	0	0
1999	Wakefield Trinity Wildcats	10	1	0	0	4
2000	Sheffield Eagles	9	1	0	0	4
2000	London Broncos	10	1	0	0	4
2001	Doncaster	11	2	0	0	8
2001	Widnes Vikings	4	1	0	0	4
2001	Dewsbury Rams	16	10	0	0	40
2001–03	Warrington Wolves	14	4	0	0	16
2002(loan)	→ Chorley Lynx	3	1	0	0	4
2002(loan)	→ Dewsbury Rams	4	2	0	0	8
2003–07	Dewsbury Rams	101	34	0	1	137
2008–09	Batley Bulldogs	47	14	0	0	56
	Total	290	84	0	2	338

Kevin Crouthers (born 3 January 1976) is a former professional rugby league footballer who played in the 1990s and 2000s. He played at club level for the Dewsbury Rams (two spells), the Bradford Bulls, the Wakefield Trinity Wildcats, the London Broncos, Doncaster, the Warrington Wolves, Chorley Lynx, and the Batley Bulldogs, as a fullback, wing, centre, or loose forward.

== Coaching career ==
Crouthers retired from playing, and was on the coaching staff at the Batley Bulldogs, working under Karl Harrison.

== Post-rugby career ==
Kevin Crouthers is a seasoned entrepreneur and leader in the UK kitchen worktop industry. He is the owner of three successful Doncaster-based businesses: Worktops at Trade, Worktop Hub, and Stone Synergy, each specialising in providing high-quality kitchen surfaces to homeowners, tradespeople, and design professionals.
