= Paul Cook (rugby league) =

England international rugby league footballer

Personal information
- Born: 23 July 1976 (age 49)

Playing information
- Position: Fullback, Wing, Centre, Stand-off
Club
Years	Team	Pld	T	G	FG	P
1992–95	Leeds	39	21	90		264
1995–97	Bradford Bulls	40	15	92	1	245
1997–99	Huddersfield Giants	35	9	86	2	210
1999–00	Hunslet Hawks	12	4	24	0	64
2000	Workington Town	27	2	81	12	182
2001	Doncaster	5	1	16	1	37
2001	Widnes Vikings	4	1	1	0	6
	Total	162	53	390	16	1008
Representative
Years	Team	Pld	T	G	FG	P
1995	England	2	0	0	0	0

Coaching information
Club
Years	Team	Gms	W	D	L	W%
2006–08	Bramley Buffaloes

Paul Cook (born 23 July 1976) is an English former professional rugby league footballer and coach. He represented England at the 1995 Rugby League World Cup, and played at club level for Leeds, Bradford Bulls and Huddersfield Giants, as a fullback, wing, centre or stand-off. and has coached at amateur level at Milford Marlins and Bramley Buffaloes.

== Playing career ==
Cook started his professional career at Leeds before being transferred to Bradford Bulls in December 1995 in exchange for Carl Hall. He played for Bradford Bulls on the wing in the 1996 Challenge Cup Final, kicking six goals in their defeat by St Helens.

In May 1997, he was signed by Huddersfield Giants for a fee of £70,000. He helped the club win promotion to the Super League, and played in the club's 18–0 win over Hull in the 1997 Divisional Premiership.

He went on to play for Hunslet Hawks, scoring a try in their 12–11 win over Dewsbury Rams in the 1999 Northern Ford Premiership Grand Final.

Cook won caps for England while at Leeds in the 1995 Rugby League World Cup against Fiji (sub), and South Africa.

== Coaching career ==
Cook began coaching in 2001 at National Conference League side Milford Marlins, and later became head coach at Bramley Buffaloes. In 2008, he joined the coaching staff at Huddersfield Giants. He returned to the amateur game in 2012, re-joining Milford Marlins as coach.
