= Mike Forshaw =

Rugby union coach and former rugby league footballer

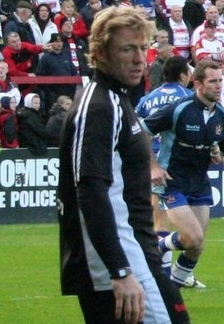

Personal information
- Born: 5 January 1970 (age 55) Wigan, Lancashire, England

Playing information
- Height: 5 ft 11 in (1.80 m)
- Weight: 15 st 8 lb (99 kg)
- Position: Second-row, Loose forward
Club
Years	Team	Pld	T	G	FG	P
1987–93	Wigan	41	6	0	0	24
1993–95	Wakefield Trinity	44	8	0	0	32
1995–96	Leeds	41	10	0	0	40
1997–03	Bradford Bulls	199	42	0	0	168
2004	Warrington Wolves	23	6	0	0	24
	Total	348	72	0	0	288
Representative
Years	Team	Pld	T	G	FG	P
1997–03	Great Britain	14	0	0	0	0
2000	England	3	0	0	0	0
	Lancashire

Michael Forshaw (born 5 January 1970) is an English rugby union coach, and former professional rugby league and rugby union player. He is currently the defence coach for the Leicester Tigers.

Forshaw began his playing career with Wigan in 1987 and went on to play for Wakefield Trinity, Bradford Bulls and Warrington Wolves. He played 14 times for Great Britain and 3 for England.

== Background ==
Forshaw was born on 5 January 1970 in Wigan, Lancashire.

== Playing career ==
=== Club ===
Forshaw started his career with Wigan. He was a largely a fringe player during his time at the club, but did make an appearance from the interchange bench in Wigan's 1991 World Club Challenge victory against the visiting Penrith Panthers. He joined Wakefield Trinity in September 1993.

After a brief spell playing rugby union for Saracens F.C., he returned to rugby league in April 1997, joining Bradford Bulls. Despite joining the club mid-season, he impressed enough to be named in the 1997 Super League Dream Team.

Forshaw played for the Bradford Bulls from the interchange bench in the 1999 Super League Grand Final which was lost to St. Helens. Forshaw played for the Bradford Bulls as a loose forward in their 2001 Super League Grand Final victory against the Wigan Warriors. As Super League VI champions, the Bradford Bulls played against the 2001 NRL Premiers, the Newcastle Knights in the 2002 World Club Challenge. Forshaw played as a loose forward in Bradford's victory. Forshaw played for the Bradford Bulls as a loose forward in their 2002 Super League Grand Final loss against St. Helens. Forshaw played for the Bradford Bulls as a loose forward in their 2003 Super League Grand Final victory against the Wigan Warriors.

He signed a one-year contract with the Warrington Wolves for the 2004 season, where he finished his playing career.

=== International ===
Forshaw was named in the England squad for the 2000 Rugby League World Cup, and won caps against Australia, Ireland, and New Zealand.

In the 1997 post-season, Forshaw was selected to play for Great Britain in two matches of the Super League Test series against Australia. Forshaw won caps for Great Britain while at Bradford Bulls in 1997 against Australia (ASL) (2 matches) (interchange/substitute), in 1998 against New Zealand (interchange/substitute), in 1999 against New Zealand (interchange/substitute), in 2001 against France (interchange/substitute), and Australia (3 matches), in 2002 against New Zealand (3 matches), and in 2003 against Australia (2 matches), and Australia (interchange/substitute).

== Coaching career ==
=== Rugby league ===
In 2004, Forshaw was appointed in a part-time role by the Rugby Football League as a performance lifestyle advisor. After ending his playing career, he rejoined Warrington in May 2005 as a strength and conditioning coach. In November 2006, he returned to his boyhood club and teamed up with his old coach Brian Noble when he was appointed to a similar coaching role at Wigan Warriors.

He studied a BSc part-time at UCLAN following Wigan's sponsorship by UCLAN.

=== Rugby union ===
In 2010, Forshaw joined Connacht in the Celtic League as defence coach.

In 2013, he joined the Sale Sharks in the same role. Forshaw follows a '3D' approach to the contact area of defence: discipline, detail and decision-making, with a particular focus when within 50m of his team's own try line. In July 2020 Forshaw extended his contract with Sale until the end of the 2022 season.

In 2023, after a decade at Sale, Forshaw was appointed as defence coach for the Wales national team for the 2023 Six Nations Championship.
