= James Lowes =

English RL coach and former GB & Ireland international rugby league footballer

Jimmy Lowes
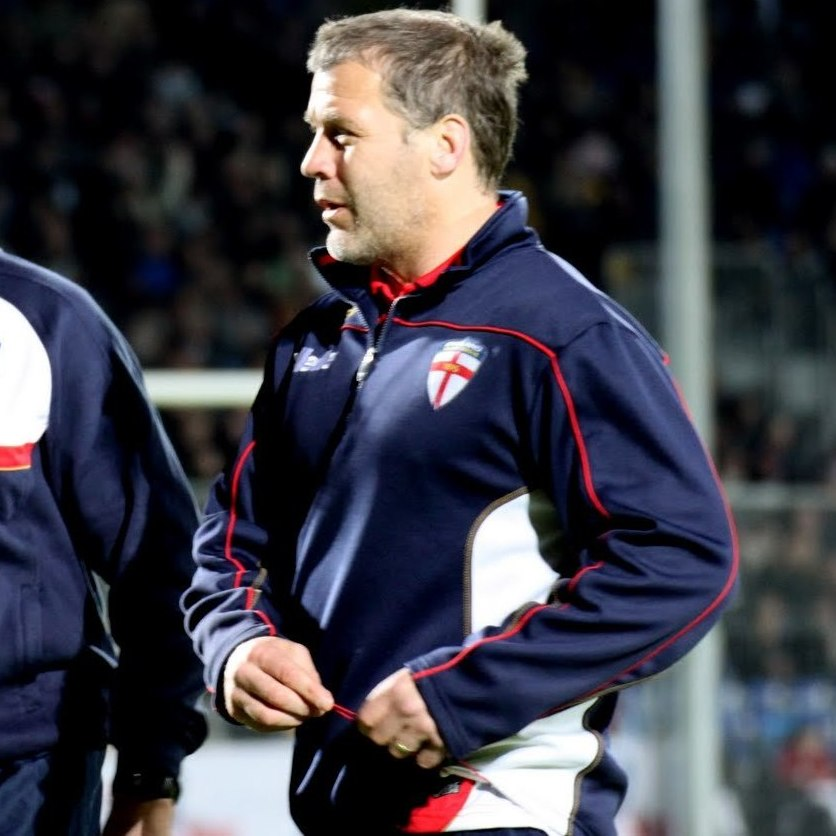

Personal information
- Full name: James Lowes
- Born: 11 October 1969 (age 56)

Playing information
- Height: 5 ft 11 in (1.80 m)
- Weight: 14 st 0 lb (89 kg)
- Position: Hooker
Club
Years	Team	Pld	T	G	FG	P
1987–92	Hunslet	94	22	19	0	126
1992–96	Leeds	125	20	0	0	80
1996–03	Bradford Bulls	238	98	6	2	406
	Total	457	140	25	2	612
Representative
Years	Team	Pld	T	G	FG	P
1997	Ireland	1	1	0	0	4
1997–02	Great Britain	5	1	0	0	4
2001	Yorkshire	1	1	0	0	4

Coaching information

Rugby league
Club
Years	Team	Gms	W	D	L	W%
2008–09	Warrington Wolves	16	7	0	9	44
2014–16	Bradford Bulls	53	31	3	19	58
2018	Leeds Rhinos	3	1	1	1	33
	Total	72	39	4	29	54

Rugby union
Club
Years	Team	Gms	W	D	L	W%
2013–14	Leeds Carnegie	34	26	0	8	76
2017–18	Yorkshire Carnegie
	Total	34	26	0	8	76

James Lowes is a rugby league and rugby union coach, and a former professional rugby league footballer. He has been senior performance coach with Halifax Panthers since 2025.

He played rugby league for Hunslet and Leeds, and found most success with Bradford Bulls, from 1996 to 2003. He won the Man of Steel Award in 1997. He won one international cap for Ireland, and five for Great Britain.

In rugby league, he has had coaching roles with Salford, Warrington Wolves, Bradford Bulls and Leeds Rhinos, England and Great Britain. In rugby union, he has coached Leeds/Yorkshire Carnegie, Ealing Trailfinders and West Park Leeds.

== Club career ==
Lowes began his career at Hunslet, joining from junior club Hunslet Parkside in October 1986. He was signed by Leeds in 1992 for an initial transfer fee of £30,000. Lowes had usually played as a stand-off or scrum-half during his early career, but was converted into a hooker when he joined Leeds.

Lowes moved to Bradford Bulls for the inaugural Super League season in 1996, following the expiry of his contract at Leeds. Lowes was the 1997 Bradford Bulls season's top try scorer, and won the Man of Steel Award as the Bradford Bulls claimed their first Super League championship. In the 1997 post-season Lowes was selected to play for Great Britain at hooker in all three matches against Australia in the Super League Test series, scoring a try in the opening game.

Lowes played for Bradford Bulls at hooker in the 1999 Super League Grand Final which was lost to St. Helens.

Lowes played for the Bradford Bulls at hooker, and scored a try in their 2001 Super League Grand Final victory against the Wigan Warriors. As Super League VI champions, the Bradford Bulls played against 2001 NRL Premiers, the Newcastle Knights in the 2002 World Club Challenge. Lowes played at hooker in Bradford's victory. Lowes played for Bradford Bulls at hooker in their 2002 Super League Grand Final loss against St. Helens. Lowes played for the Bradford Bulls at hooker and scored a try in their 2003 Super League Grand Final victory against the Wigan Warriors, which was his last match before retirement.

Lowes was included in Bradford's 'Millennium Masters', 'Bull Masters', and in August 2007 was named in the club's 'Team of the Century'. Only six players have been included in all three lists; Lowes, Karl Fairbank, Trevor Foster, Keith Mumby, Robbie Paul and Ernest Ward.

== Coaching career ==
=== Rugby league ===
Lowes began a coaching career following his retirement as a player, joining Salford City Reds as an assistant coach in 2004. Whilst on the coaching staff at Salford he made one appearance in a friendly match against Swinton, scoring a try.

Lowes later moved to Warrington Wolves as an assistant coach, and was named head coach following the departure of Paul Cullen in the 2008 season. After a disappointing opening to the 2009 season Lowes left the club and was replaced by Tony Smith. He later joined Leeds Rhinos as an assistant to Brian McDermott.

In June 2014 Lowes was named head coach at Bradford Bulls. After the disappointment and shock of being relegated after Super League XIX after being one of the most successful Super League teams, Lowes led his team to one game away from returning to the Super League in 2016. They needed to win a 'Million Pound Game' and final qualifier against Wakefield, but suffered a 24-16 defeat which meant Bradford remained in the Championship for the 2016 season. Lowes after the match said he was tempted to quit rugby league.

In August 2015, Lowes became assistant coach of the England national team, becoming Steve McNamara's assistant. Lowes helped England defeat New Zealand 2-1 in a three-test series in 2015. He then later left to take up teaching 14-19 year olds.

In July 2018 he returned to Leeds Rhinos as first team coach, after the departure of Brian McDermott. He became an assistant coach when David Furner took over in September 2018. He left the club in April 2019.

In 2025 he joined Halifax Panthers, where he is a senior performance coach.

=== Rugby union ===
After retiring from playing rugby league, Lowes played amateur rugby union for West Park Leeds.

In 2013 he was named head coach at rugby union club Leeds Carnegie, partner club of Leeds Rhinos. He left in June 2014 to join Bradford Bulls. He returned to the club, then renamed Yorkshire Carnegie, in 2016, initially as assistant to Bryan Redpath, before becoming head coach in 2017. He left in June 2018.

From 2019, Lowes spent two seasons with Ealing Trailfinders as a skills coach. In 2021 he returned to West Park Leeds as director of rugby.
