= Jeremy Donougher =

Australian rugby league footballer

Personal information
- Born: 28 November 1969 (age 56) Sydney, New South Wales, Australia

Playing information
- Position: Prop, Second-row
Club
Years	Team	Pld	T	G	FG	P
1993–95	South Sydney	51	3	0	0	12
1995–99	Bradford Bulls	60	16	0	0	64
	Total	111	19	0	0	76

Jeremy Donougher (born 28 November 1969) is an Australian former professional rugby league footballer who played at club level for the South Sydney Rabbitohs and the Bradford Bulls.

== Career ==
Donougher made his first grade debut for South Sydney in round 2 of the 1993 season against Manly at Brookvale Oval. Donougher played for Souths in their upset 1994 Tooheys Challenge Cup final victory over Brisbane.

Donougher joined Bradford in December 1995. In 1996, he scored a hat trick of tries for the club against Castleford, and played in the 1996 Challenge Cup Final defeat against St. Helens. He missed out on the cup final rematch a year later due to injury.
