= Sonny Nickle =

English international rugby league footballer (born 1969)

Personal information
- Full name: Sonny Julian Nickle
- Born: 4 May 1969 (age 57) Leeds, West Riding of Yorkshire, England

Playing information
- Position: Prop, Second-row
Club
Years	Team	Pld	T	G	FG	P
1987–88	Hunslet	26+1	8	0	0	32
1989–91	Sheffield Eagles	55+4	22	0	0	88
1991–95	St Helens	110+7	35	0	0	140
1995–98	Bradford Bulls	44+20	18	0	0	72
1999–02	St Helens	96+19	14	0	0	56
2003	Leigh Centurions	30	4	0	0	16
	Total	412	101	0	0	404
Representative
Years	Team	Pld	T	G	FG	P
1995	England	1	0	0	0	0
1992–95	Great Britain	6	0	0	0	0
1992	GB tour games	0+2	0	0	0	0

Sonny Nickle (born 4 May 1969) is an English former professional rugby league footballer who played in the 1980s, 1990s and 2000s. He played at club level as a prop or second-row for Hunslet, St Helens, Bradford Bulls, Sheffield Eagles and the Leigh Centurions.

== Background ==
Sonny Nickle was born in Leeds, West Riding of Yorkshire, England. He is the youngest of four brothers.

== Playing career ==
Nickle joined St Helens from Sheffield Eagles in July 1991. St Helens paid Sheffield an initial fee of £80,000, set by an independent tribunal, and an additional £25,000 after Nickle was selected to play for Great Britain.

Sonny Nickle played second-row in St Helens 4–5 defeat by Wigan in the 1992 Lancashire Cup Final during the 1992–93 season at Knowsley Road, St. Helens on Sunday 18 October 1992.

In 1995, he was part of the package put together by St Helens to bring Paul Newlove to the club from the Bradford Bulls. Sonny Nickle was an athletic forward who was a powerful runner. He enjoyed the distinction of representing Great Britain on six occasions.

Nickle played for Bradford at second-row in their 1996 Challenge Cup Final defeat by St Helens.

Nickle returned to St Helens in 1999, and played in their 1999 Super League Grand Final victory over Bradford Bulls. Having won the 1999 Championship, St. Helens contested in the 2000 World Club Challenge against National Rugby League Premiers the Melbourne Storm, with Nickle playing at hooker in the loss. Nickle appeared from the bench in the Saints' 2000 Super League Grand Final victory over Wigan Warriors. As Super League V champions, St. Helens played against 2000 NRL Premiers, the Brisbane Broncos in the 2001 World Club Challenge, Nickle played at prop in Saints' victory.

In September 2001, Nickle was suspended for six months for a tackle on Leeds Rhinos hooker Robbie Mears, which broke the Leeds player's jaw. The suspension was changed to a nine-match ban following an appeal. The club attempted to shorten the ban by allowing Nickle to sign a short-term contract with Northern Ford Premiership side Barrow Border Raiders, whose new season started earlier than St Helens. When Nickle re-signed with Saints, the RFL confirmed that Nickle had to serve the remainder of his ban, as the matches with Barrow would not count towards his suspension.
