= Jon Scales =

English rugby footballer

Personal information
- Full name: Jonathan Scales
- Born: 28 July 1974 (age 51); Leeds, West Yorkshire, England

Playing information

Rugby union
- Position: Wing
Club
Years	Team	Pld	T	G	FG	P
19??–93	Newcastle Gosforth
1999	Leeds Tykes	11	10	0	0	50
	Total	11	10	0	0	50

Rugby league
- Position: Wing
Club
Years	Team	Pld	T	G	FG	P
1993–95	Leeds
1995–98	Bradford Bulls
2000	Halifax Blue Sox	1	0	0	0	0
	Total	1	0	0	0	0

Jon Scales (born 28 July 1974) is an English former rugby league and rugby union footballer who played in the 1990s and 2000s. He played club level rugby union (RU) for Newcastle Gosforth and Leeds Tykes, as a wing, and club level rugby league (RL) for Leeds, Bradford Bulls and Halifax Blue Sox, as a wing.

== Career ==
Scales started his career in rugby union with Newcastle Gosforth before switching to rugby league to sign for Leeds in March 1993. He failed to establish a place in the first team, and moved to the Bradford Bulls in 1995. In 1996, he scored a hat trick in the Challenge Cup semi final in a 28–6 victory over former club Leeds. He also scored in the final against St. Helens but the team went on to lose 32–40. He left the club at the end of the 1998's Super League III, and switched back to rugby union to play for Leeds Tykes. He later had a spell playing rugby union in France.

In 2000, he spent a month on trial at Halifax Blue Sox, but made just one first team appearance before being released. He returned to rugby union to play for Sedgley Park.
