= Bernard Dwyer =

GB international rugby league footballer

Personal information
- Full name: Bernard John Dwyer
- Born: 20 April 1967 (age 59) St Helens, England, United Kingdom

Playing information
- Position: Second-row
Club
| Years | Team | Pld | T | G | FG | P |
|---|---|---|---|---|---|---|
| 1985–95 | St Helens | 232 | 39 | 60 | 1 | 277 |
| 1989 | Manly Sea Eagles | 5 | 0 | 0 | 0 | 0 |
| 1995–00 | Bradford Bulls | 97 | 15 | 0 | 0 | 60 |
| | Total | 334 | 54 | 60 | 1 | 337 |
Representative
| Years | Team | Pld | T | G | FG | P |
| 1996 | Great Britain | 1 | 0 | 0 | 0 | 0 |
| 1996–99 | Ireland | 2 | 0 | 0 | 0 | 0 |

Bernard John Dwyer (born 20 April 1967) is a former professional rugby league footballer who played in the 1980s and 1990s. He played in the Super League and featured as a second-row. He played for the St Helens and the Bradford Bulls during a successful rugby league career - he enjoyed the distinction of winning every club honour in the English game.

Dwyer main strengths were viewed as his professional conduct and work rate. His commitment was regarded by observers as exemplary, and this was reflected in his testimonial year at St. Helens where 'the perpetual motion man' was recognised for his work rate. He retired from the sport in 2000.

Bernard Dwyer played hooker, and scored 2-conversions in St. Helens' 4-5 defeat by Wigan in the 1992 Lancashire Cup Final during the 1992–93 season at Knowsley Road, St. Helens on Sunday 18 October 1992.

In 1995, Dwyer was part of the package that brought Paul Newlove to St. Helens from Bradford Bulls. The deal saw Bradford Bulls acquire three St. Helens players as well as a quarter of a million pounds.

Dwyer played for Bradford Bulls at hooker in their 1996 Challenge Cup Final defeat by St. Helens.

Dwyer played for Bradford Bulls at second-row in the 1999 Super League Grand Final which was lost to St. Helens.

Bernard is married to wife Jackie and has two children, the oldest Kelly lives in Sydney, whilst the youngest Connor plays Rugby League for Widnes.
