= Simon Knox =

Scotland international rugby league footballer and coach

Personal information
- Full name: Simon James Knox
- Born: 14 October 1972 (age 53) Whitehaven, Cumberland, England

Playing information
- Position: Prop, Second-row
Club
| Years | Team | Pld | T | G | FG | P |
|---|---|---|---|---|---|---|
| 1991–95 | Carlisle |
| 1995–98 | Bradford Northern |
| 1998 | Salford Reds | 2 | 0 | 0 | 0 | 0 |
| 1998 | Whitehaven |
| 1999 | Workington Town |
| 1999–00 | Halifax | 6 | 0 | 0 | 0 | 0 |
| 2000–01 | Widnes Vikings | 45 | 9 | 0 | 1 |
| 2002 | Oldham | 3 | 0 | 0 | 0 | 0 |
| 2002 | Leigh Centurions |
| 2003 | Swinton Lions |
| 2004 | Leigh Centurions |
| 2005 | Barrow |
| | Total | 56 | 9 | 0 | 1 | 0 |
Representative
| Years | Team | Pld | T | G | FG | P |
| 1998–03 | Scotland | 4 |

Coaching information
Club
| Years | Team | Gms | W | D | L | W% |
| 2005–07 | Blackpool Panthers |

Simon Knox (born 14 October 1972) is a former Scotland international rugby league footballer who played in the 1990s and 2000s, and also coached. He played at club level for Hensingham ARLFC (in Hensingham, Whitehaven), Carlisle, Bradford Northern, Salford Reds, Workington Town, Halifax, Widnes Vikings, Oldham RLFC, Leigh Centurions (two spells), Swinton Lions and Barrow Raiders, as a prop or second-row, and coached at club level for the Blackpool Panthers and the Leigh Centurions (Under-21s).

== Background ==
Simon Knox was born in Whitehaven, Cumberland, England.

== Playing career ==
Simon Knox was transferred from amateur club Hensingham ARLFC to Carlisle in 1991. He spent four seasons at the club before joining Bradford Northern in 1995.

Knox played for the Bradford Bulls at loose forward in the 1996 Challenge Cup Final defeat by St. Helens.

Knox won 3 caps (plus 1 as substitute) for Scotland in 1998–2003 while at Bradford Bulls and Swinton Lions.

He retired from playing in 2005 and moved into coaching.

Sporting positions
| Preceded by Kevin Ashcroft; 2005 | Coach Blackpool Panthers; 2005-2007 | Succeeded by Andy Gregory; 2007 |
