= Matt Calland =

England international Rugby League footballer and coach

Personal information
- Full name: Matthew Hugh Calland
- Born: 20 August 1971 (age 54) Widnes, Cheshire, England

Playing information
- Height: 6 ft 0 in (183 cm)
- Weight: 15 st 6 lb (98 kg)
- Position: Wing, Centre
Club
Years	Team	Pld	T	G	FG	P
1990–93	Rochdale Hornets	60	30	0	0	120
1993–95	Featherstone Rovers	45	27	0	0	108
1995–98	Bradford Bulls	61	30	0	0	120
1999	Hull FC	2	0	0	0	0
2001–03	Rochdale Hornets	60	30	0	0	120
2003	Huddersfield Giants	3	0	0	0	0
2003(loan)	→Rochdale Hornets	4	1	0	0	4
2004	Hull Kingston Rovers	14	6	0	0	24
	Total	249	124	0	0	496
Representative
Years	Team	Pld	T	G	FG	P
1996	England	1	0	0	0	0

Coaching information
Club
Years	Team	Gms	W	D	L	W%
2008–11	Halifax	121	78	1	42	64
2019–22	Rochdale Hornets	56	24	1	31	43
	Total	177	102	2	73	58

Matthew Hugh Calland (born 20 August 1971) is an English former rugby league footballer who played in the 1990s and 2000s, and coached in the 2000s and 2010s. He played at representative level for England, and at club level for the Rochdale Hornets (two spells), Featherstone Rovers, the Bradford Bulls, Hull FC and the Huddersfield Giants, as a wing or centre, and coached at club level for Halifax.

== Background ==
Matt Calland was born in Widnes, Lancashire, England.

== Playing career ==
=== Rochdale Hornets ===
Calland started his professional rugby league career with Rochdale Hornets, signing from Oldham St Annes in 1990. He played in Rochdale Hornets 14–24 defeat by St. Helens in the 1991 Lancashire Cup Final during the 1991–92 season at Wilderspool Stadium, Warrington, on Sunday 20 October 1991. He joined Featherstone Rovers in September 1993 for a transfer fee of £30,000.

=== Bradford Bulls ===
In November 1995, Calland was signed by Bradford Bulls from Featherstone Rovers as part of an exchange deal which saw Deryck Fox and Roy Powell transfer from Bradford to Featherstone.

Calland played at centre in Bradford Bulls' 32–40 defeat by St. Helens in the 1996 Challenge Cup Final at Wembley Stadium, London on Saturday 26 April 1996. and was a substitute in Bradford Bulls' 22–32 defeat by St. Helens in the 1997 Challenge Cup Final at Wembley Stadium, London on Saturday 3 May 1997.

=== International honours ===
Matt Calland won a cap for England while at the Bradford Bulls in 1996 against France (sub).

== Coaching career ==
Calland began coaching at Hopwood Hall College in 2003. He was named the assistant coach at Halifax in June 2006. Martin Hall moved upstairs in October to take up the post of director of football. He was then named the new head coach of Halifax. In 2010, he coached the team to victory in the Championship Grand Final against favourites Featherstone Rovers. They came back from 4–22 down to win 23–22 in extra time. It was the first trophy Halifax had won in 23 years.

In May 2019, he was named as head coach at Rochdale Hornets. He left the club by mutual consent in August 2022.
