= Nathan Graham =

Rugby league footballer and coach

Personal information
- Full name: Nathan James Graham
- Born: 23 November 1971 (age 54) Sodbury, Gloucestershire, England

Playing information
- Position: Fullback, Wing, Centre, Hooker, Loose forward
Club
Years	Team	Pld	T	G	FG	P
1989–95	Dewsbury Rams	148	7	9	0	28
1995–98	Bradford Bulls	50	4	0	1	78
2000–01	Dewsbury Rams	31	8	0	0	32
2001–03	Featherstone Rovers	67	21	0	1	85
2004	York City Knights	26	7	1	0	30
	Batley Bulldogs
	Total	322	47	10	2	253
Representative
Years	Team	Pld	T	G	FG	P
1998–04	Scotland	10	0	0	0	0

Coaching information
Club
Years	Team	Gms	W	D	L	W%
2026–	Huddersfield Giants Women	0	0	0	0
Representative
Years	Team	Gms	W	D	L	W%
2019–25	Scotland	5	2	1	2	40
- Source: As of 7 November 2025

Nathan Graham (born 23 November 1971) is a professional rugby league coach who is the head coach of Huddersfield Giants Women and a former rugby league footballer who played as a fullback, wing, centre, hooker or loose forward in the 1990s and 2000s.

He played at international level for Scotland, and at club level for the Dewsbury Rams (two spells), Bradford Bulls, Featherstone Rovers, York City Knights and the Batley Bulldogs.

== Playing career ==
=== Bradford Bulls ===
Graham played for the Bradford Bulls at fullback in their 1996 Challenge Cup Final loss to St Helens. He made 26 appearances for York City Knights in 2004.

=== Featherstone Rovers ===
Nathan Graham made his début for Featherstone Rovers on 2 December 2001.

=== International ===
Graham was a Scotland international and played at the 2000 Rugby League World Cup.

== Coaching career ==
=== Keighley Cougars ===
After his playing career ended Graham moved into coaching and in October 2016 joined Keighley Cougars as assistant coach after five years of amateur team Drighlington ARLFC.

=== Scotland ===
Graham was appointed head coach of Scotland at the end of 2019.

On 1 August 2025 it was reported that he had stepped down from the Scotland head coach role

=== Huddersfield Giants Women ===
On 6 November 2025 he was announced as the new head coach of Huddersfield Giants Women
