= Robbie Hunter-Paul =

NZ international rugby league footballer and sports broadcaster/pundit

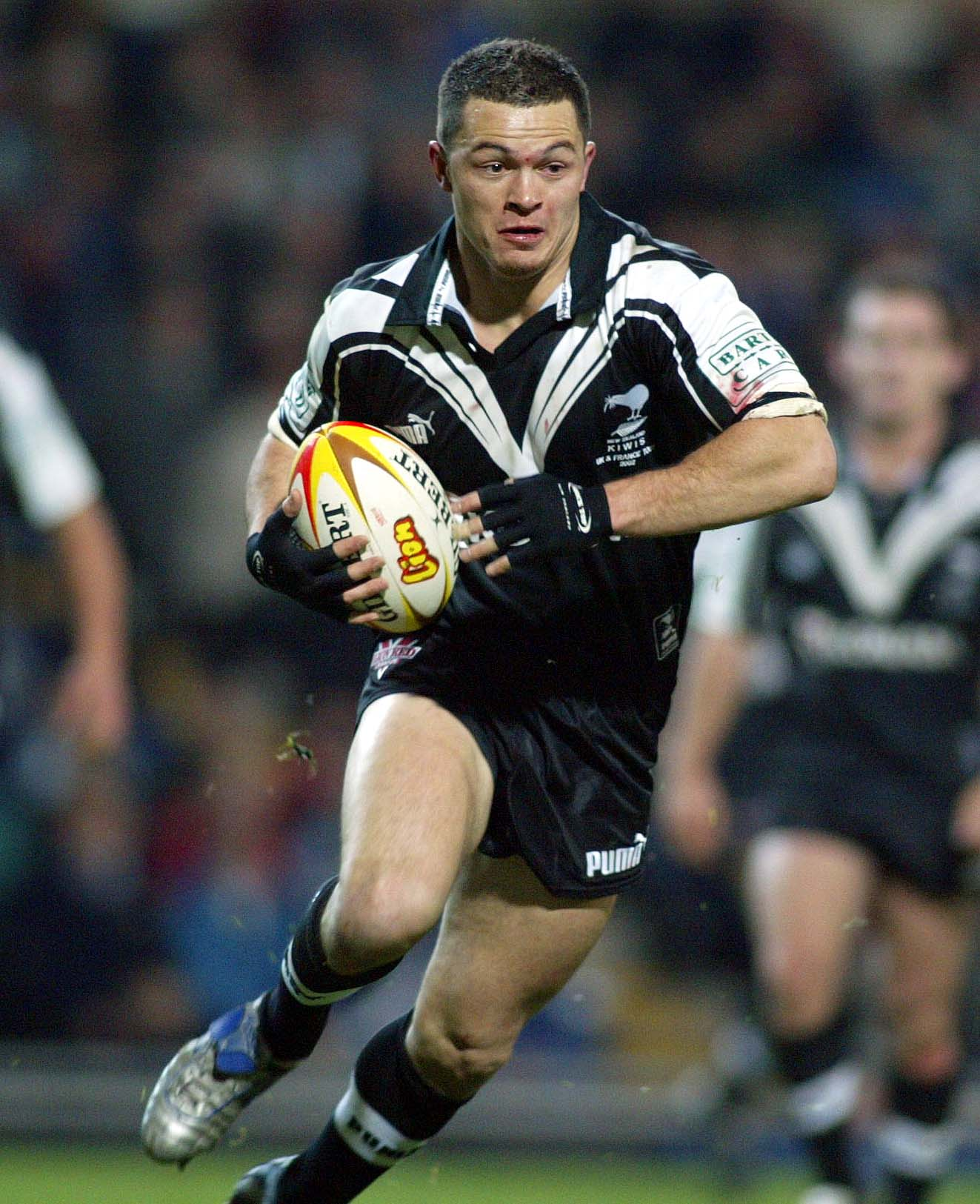

Personal information
- Full name: Robert (Robbie) Rawiri Hunter-Paul
- Born: Robert Rawiri Paul; 3 February 1976 (age 50) Tokoroa, New Zealand

Playing information
- Height: 1.78 m (5 ft 10 in)
- Weight: 87 kg (13 st 10 lb)

Rugby league
- Position: Scrum-half, Stand-off, Hooker, Fullback
Club
| Years | Team | Pld | T | G | FG | P |
|---|---|---|---|---|---|---|
| 1994 | Waitakere City | 11 | 3 | 0 | 0 | 12 |
| 1994–05 | Bradford Bulls | 305 | 156 | 3 | 0 | 630 |
| 2006–07 | Huddersfield Giants | 60 | 14 | 0 | 0 | 56 |
| 2008–09 | Salford City Reds | 51 | 9 | 0 | 0 | 36 |
| 2010–11 | Leigh Centurions | 40 | 8 | 2 | 0 | 36 |
| | Total | 467 | 190 | 5 | 0 | 770 |
Representative
| Years | Team | Pld | T | G | FG | P |
| 1997–06 | New Zealand | 29 | 13 | 2 | 0 | 56 |

Rugby union
Club
| Years | Team | Pld | T | G | FG | P |
|---|---|---|---|---|---|---|
| 1996–97 | Harlequins | 10 | 3 | 0 | 0 | 15 |
- Relatives: Henry Paul (brother)

Robert Rawiri Hunter-Paul (born 3 February 1976) is a New Zealand former rugby league footballer. He has since become a business owner and television pundit, running Xtra Mile Marketing, an inbound and digital marketing company. Robbie retired from playing at the end of the 2011 season following a 19-season career with the Bradford Bulls, Harlequin FC, Huddersfield Giants, Salford City Reds and the Leigh Centurions. He then spent just under 2 years as business development manager at the Huddersfield Giants, and 3 years as CEO at the Bradford Bulls. Robbie played for the New Zealand Kiwis national team from 1997 - 2006. He is the younger brother of former New Zealand Kiwis and England Rugby player Henry Paul.

== Background ==
Born in Tokoroa, New Zealand, his junior club was the Te Atatu Roosters in West Auckland. His mother, Gail, is of English descent and his father, Te Whata, known as Walter, is Maori (NZ indigenous).

== Playing career ==
=== Club career ===
In the 1994 Lion Red Cup he played 11 games for the Waitakere City Raiders, scoring three tries.

==== Bradford Bulls ====
Paul joined Bradford in July 1994 from New Zealand at the age of 18 and has since gone on to represent New Zealand. He made his debut for Bradford after months languishing in the reserves.

When Super League and summer rugby arrived, so did Australian coach Brian Smith, who made Paul captain. In the semi-final of the 1996 Challenge Cup, Bradford shocked traditional foes Leeds at Huddersfield.

Paul captained Bradford at scrum half back in the 1996 Challenge Cup Final and became the fourth player ever to achieve what was a Challenge Cup final record of three tries, being awarded the Lance Todd Trophy for man-of-the-match. He was the 1996 Bradford Bulls season's top try scorer and still holds the record for most tries scored for the Bulls.

Paul played for Bradford Bulls as his brother Henry's halves partner in the 1999 Super League Grand Final which was lost to St Helens R.F.C.

Paul played for the Bradford Bulls as his brother Henry's halves partner in their 2001 Super League Grand Final victory against the Wigan Warriors.

As Super League VI champions, the Bulls played against 2001 NRL Premiers, the Newcastle Knights in the 2002 World Club Challenge. Paul captained at stand-off half back and scored two tries in Bradford's victory. Paul played for Bradford Bulls at stand-off half back, scoring a try in their 2002 Super League Grand Final loss against St Helens.

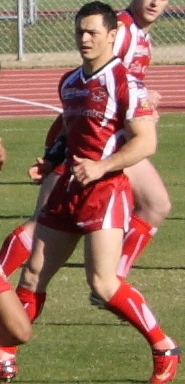
Paul playing for the Salford City Reds

Paul captained the Bulls to the "Treble" in 2003. He played for the Bradford Bulls from the interchange bench in their 2003 Super League Grand Final victory against the Wigan Warriors. He captained the Bulls to victory against Australian side Penrith Panthers in the 2004 World Club Challenge.

He played for the Bradford Bulls at hooker in their 2004 Super League Grand Final loss against the Leeds Rhinos.

The following year he played for the Bradford Bulls from the interchange bench in their 2005 Super League Grand Final victory against the Leeds Rhinos.

His Bradford Bulls testimonial was played on 27 January 2006 against Hull Kingston Rovers at Odsal Stadium.

He has been included in Bradford's; 'Millennium Masters', 'Bull Masters', and in August 2007 he was named in the 'Team of the Century'. Only six players have been included in all three lists. Robbie Paul was voted the 1996 Super League Player of the season at 20 years of age.

==== Huddersfield Giants ====
At the start of 2006's Super League XI, Paul moved from Bradford Bulls to fellow West Yorkshire side Huddersfield Giants. He played at scrum half back in his 2006 Challenge Cup Final in August. Despite scoring a second-half try, his side lost 42–12 to St Helens R.F.C. at Twickenham stadium.

==== Salford City Reds ====
In September 2007, it was announced that he had signed for the Salford City Reds on a two-year deal. This was seen as something of a coup for the club, as they had just been relegated from the Super League.

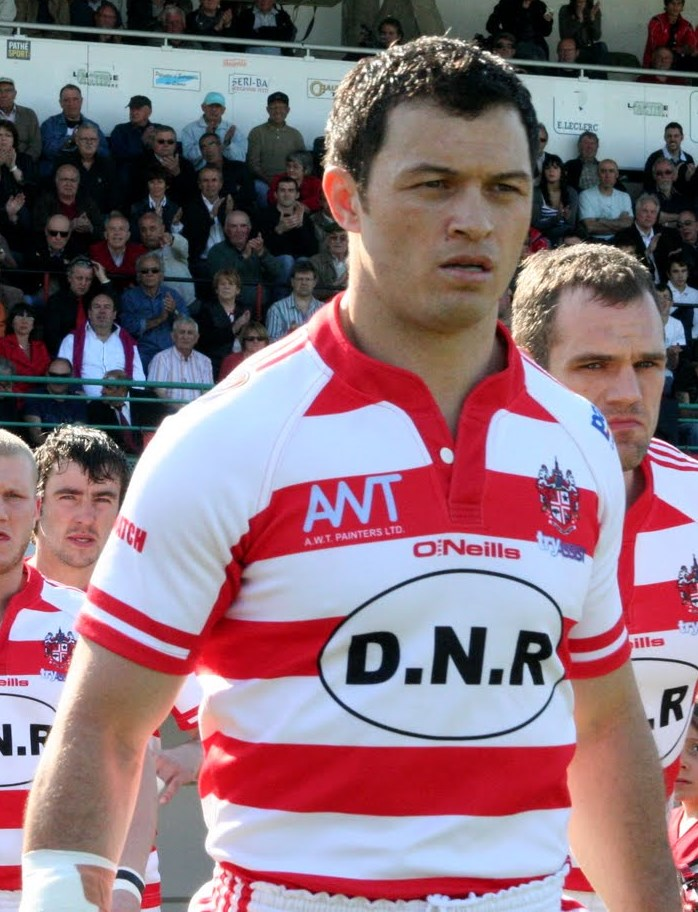
Paul playing for the Leigh Centurions

==== Leigh Centurions ====
He signed with Co-operative Championship side Leigh Centurions for the 2010 season. He retired at the end of the 2011 season.

==== Harlequins ====
Paul went into his winter loan spell with rugby union club Harlequins in 1996 and 1997.

=== International career ===
Paul was selected for the New Zealand team to compete in the end of season 1999 Rugby League Tri-Nations tournament. In the final against Australia he partnered his brother Henry in the halves, kicking six goals in the Kiwis' 22–20 loss.

== Music ==
In 2000, alongside his brother Henry and Lazarus, he released a single with his band Massey, named after the town in New Zealand where the Paul brothers grew up. They had played a couple of dates by the end of 2000 and previously released a cover version of "Ain't No Stoppin' Us Now" in 1999.

== Media career ==
He used to host the weekly rugby league show 'The RHP Show' every Wednesday at 6pm on West Yorkshire's pulse 2 Radio Station. His contract was terminated in 2019

Robbie Hunter-Paul regularly appears on the BBC's rugby league coverage including the Super League Show and the Challenge Cup games.

== Personal life ==
On 17 December 2010, he married Natalie Hunter in Auckland, New Zealand, at a ceremony attended by many of the world's greatest rugby players and duly changed his surname to incorporate "Hunter".
