= 2001 Bradford Bulls season =

- Super League VI Rank: 1st
- Play-off result: Winners
- Challenge Cup: Runners Up
- 2001 record: Wins: 28; draws: 1; losses: 6
- Points scored: For: 1386; against: 537

Team information
- Chairman: Chris Caisley
- Head Coach: Brian Noble
- Captain: Robbie Paul
- Stadium: Valley Parade
- Avg. attendance: 12,086
- High attendance: 16,572 vs. St. Helens

Top scorers
- Tries: Michael Withers (31)
- Goals: Henry Paul (208)
- Points: Henry Paul (457)
← 2000	List of seasons	2002 →

This article details the Bradford Bulls rugby league football club's 2001 season, the 6th season of the Super League era.

== Season review ==
February 2001

The Bulls started their defence of the Challenge Cup with a 54–10 win over Championship side Widnes Vikings, Michael Withers was the key man as he crossed for a hat-trick. Bradford backed up this great start with a dominating performance in the 5th Round of the Challenge Cup as they cruised past Halifax Blue Sox 68–18.

March 2001

Bradford begun their Super League campaign by beating champions St Helens R.F.C. 31–24, new signing Shane Rigon scored a hat-trick which helped the Bulls get off to a winning start. The Bulls continued their Challenge Cup defence with a 38–0 win over Wakefield Trinity Wildcats. Bradford kept their winning streak intact as they hammered Salford City Reds 40–6 and then backed this up with a 30–14 win away at Huddersfield Giants.

April 2001

The Bulls continued their good start to the season with a hard fought 24–6 victory over London Broncos however the next week they were surprised as Wakefield Trinity Wildcats beat Bradford 16–12 to end the Bulls winning streak. Bradford soon got back to winning ways with a great performance by beating Wigan Warriors 35–24, this victory was short lived however as the Bulls drew 24–24 to Hull FC. The Bulls were not able to defend their Challenge Cup title as they fell 13–6 to St Helens R.F.C. in a match which was played under terrible weather as rain swept Twickenham Stadium.

May 2001

Bradford put the Challenge Cup loss behind them as they defeated Warrington Wolves 56–24 at Valley Parade. They backed this up with a hard fought 24–22 win against Castleford Tigers. Bradford continued their winning streak with an outstanding 33–14 win over arch rivals Leeds Rhinos at Headingley Stadium. The Bulls defeated Halifax Blue Sox at home with an emphatic 64–12 win, Leon Pryce was the star of the match scoring a hat-trick whilst Henry Paul kicked 10 goals. Bradford finished May with a 42–10 victory over Salford City Reds.

June 2001

Bradford started June with a 38–26 loss at the hands of St Helens R.F.C. They soon bounced back though with an outstanding 78–18 win against Huddersfield Giants. The Bulls backed up this fine form with a 42–0 win against London Broncos and then recorded another big win as they beat Wakefield Trinity Wildcats 62–10. Bradford finished the month with a 44–30 loss to a fired up Wigan Warriors side.

July 2001

The Bulls started July with a bang as the outclassed Hull F.C. and beat them 40–0. Bradford posted yet another big score as they took apart Castleford Tigers with a 44–4 victory. The Bulls continued their good form as they smashed rivals Leeds Rhinos 44–22 at Valley Parade. Bradford finished July with a 52–28 win against Halifax Blue Sox.

August 2001

The month started with a disappointing 18–14 loss to Warrington Wolves. They soon bounced back and Leeds Rhinos were on the wrong end of a 34–6 scoreline, in this match Henry Paul became the joint top scorer for the Bulls in the Super League era as he registered 860 points (joint with Steve McNamara). Henry Paul took over Steve McNamara as highest point scorer for the Bulls in the Super League as he kicked 8 goals in the impressive 27–14 win against St Helens R.F.C. A Michael Withers hat-trick helped the Bulls to a 56–30 victory over the Castleford Tigers. The Bulls ended the month with an unfortunate 16–10 loss to Wigan Warriors.

September 2001

Bradford started September with a bang as Graham Mackay and Michael Withers both scored a hat-trick as the Bulls beat Warrington Wolves 84–12. Bradford finished the regular season with a 62–18 win over rivals Leeds Rhinos which meant that the Bulls ended the season on top of the table by points difference. At the end of the month Bradford faced Wigan Warriors in the Qualifying Semi-final, the Bulls won 24–18 thanks to the Paul brother dominating with ball and boot. Robbie Paul scored 2 tries while brother Henry Paul kicked 8 goals.

October 2001

Bradford's opponents for the Grand Final were Wigan Warriors. The Bulls asserted their dominance early on as they raced into a 22–0 lead in the first half. Michael Withers scored a hat-trick and Stuart Fielden, James Lowes and Graham Mackay (in his last game) also scored for the Bulls. Henry Paul slotted a drop goal over to ensure that the Bulls became Super League champions for a 2nd time.

== 2001 milestones ==
- CCR4: Michael Withers scored his 4th hat-trick for the Bulls.
- CCR5: Daniel Gartner and Lee Gilmour scored their 1st tries for the Bulls.
- CCR5: Robbie Paul scored his 75th try and reached 300 points for the Bulls.
- Round 1: Shane Rigon scored his 1st try and 1st hat-trick for the Bulls.
- CCQF: Henry Paul scored his 25th try for the Bulls.
- Round 3: Leon Pryce scored his 25th try and reached 100 points for the Bulls.
- Round 4: Henry Paul reached 600 points for the Bulls.
- Round 8: Graham Mackay scored his 1st try for the Bulls.
- Round 8: Tevita Vaikona scored his 3rd hat-trick for the Bulls.
- Round 9: James Lowes reached 300 points with the Bulls.
- Round 11: Leon Pryce scored his 1st hat-trick for the Bulls.
- Round 11: Henry Paul reached 700 points with the Bulls.
- Round 12: Lee Gilmour scored his 1st hat-trick for the Bulls.
- Round 12: Henry Paul kicked his 300th goal for the Bulls.
- Round 14: Graham Mackay scored his 1st hat-trick for the Bulls.
- Round 14: Joe Vagana scored his 1st try for the Bulls.
- Round 16: Tevita Vaikona and Michael Withers scored their 50th tries and reached 200 points for the Bulls.
- Round 18: Henry Paul reached 800 points with the Bulls.
- Round 19: James Lowes scored his 75th try for the Bulls.
- Round 21: Tevita Vaikona scored his 4th hat-trick for the Bulls.
- Round 25: Michael Withers scored his 5th hat-trick for the Bulls.
- Round 27: Graham Mackay scored his 2nd hat-trick for the Bulls.
- Round 27: Michael Withers scored his 6th hat-trick for the Bulls.
- Round 27: Henry Paul reached 900 points for the Bulls.
- Round 27: Paul Deacon kicked his 100th goal for the Bulls.
- Round 28: Henry Paul kicked his 400th goal for the Bulls.
- Grand Final: Michael Withers scored his 7th hat-trick for the Bulls.
- Grand Final: Graham Mackay kicked his 1st goal for the Bulls.

== Table ==
Pos	Team	Pld	W	D	L	PF	PA	PD	Pts	Qualification
1	Bradford Bulls (L, C)	28	22	1	5	1120	474	+646	45	Semi Final
2	Wigan Warriors	28	22	1	5	989	494	+495	45	Qualifying play-off
3	Hull F.C.	28	20	2	6	772	630	+142	42	Qualifying play-off
4	St Helens	28	17	2	9	924	732	+192	36	Elimination play-off
5	Leeds Rhinos	28	16	1	11	774	721	+53	33	Elimination play-off
6	London Broncos	28	13	1	14	644	603	+41	27	
7	Warrington Wolves	28	11	2	15	646	860	−214	24	
8	Castleford Tigers	28	10	1	17	581	777	−196	21	
9	Halifax Blue Sox	28	9	0	19	630	819	−189	18	
10	Salford City Reds	28	8	0	20	587	956	−369	16	
11	Wakefield Trinity Wildcats	28	8	0	20	529	817	−288	14 (Note: Wakefield deducted 2 points for salary cap breaches.)	
12	Huddersfield Giants (R)	28	6	1	21	613	926	−313	13	Relegation to Northern Ford Premiership

Source: Rugby League Project
Rules for classification: 1) Points; 2) Points difference; 3) Number of points scored;
(C) Champions; (L) League Leaders; (R) Relegated

== 2001 fixtures and results ==
LEGEND
Win
Draw
Loss

2001 Tetley's Super League

Date	Competition	Rnd	Vrs	H/A	Venue	Result	Score	Tries	Goals	Att
4 March 2001	Super League VI	1	St. Helens	H	Valley Parade	W	31–24	Rigon (3), H.Paul, Spruce	H.Paul 5/5, H.Paul 1 DG	16,572
16 March 2001	Super League VI	2	Salford City Reds	A	The Willows	W	40–6	Peacock (2), Anderson, Lowes, Rigon, Spruce, Withers	H.Paul 6/7	4,355
25 March 2001	Super League VI	3	Huddersfield Giants	A	McAlpine Stadium	W	30–14	Deacon, Gartner, R.Paul, Pryce, Vaikona	Deacon 4/4, H.Paul 1/1	6,448
8 April 2001	Super League VI	4	London Broncos	H	Valley Parade	W	24–6	Anderson, Lowes, Pryce, Rigon	H.Paul 4/4	10,804
12 April 2001	Super League VI	5	Wakefield Trinity Wildcats	A	Belle Vue	L	12–16	R.Paul, Pryce	Deacon 2/2	4,721
16 April 2001	Super League VI	6	Wigan Warriors	H	Valley Parade	W	35–24	Gartner, R.Paul, Pryce, Rigon, Vaikona	H.Paul 7/7, H.Paul 1 DG	16,247
21 April 2001	Super League VI	7	Hull F.C.	A	The Boulevard	D	24–24	Gartner (2), Forshaw	H.Paul 6/6	7,518
2 May 2001	Super League VI	8	Warrington Wolves	H	Valley Parade	W	56–24	Vaikona (3), Gilmour, Mackay, Naylor, R.Paul, Pryce, Withers	H.Paul 8/8, Deacon 2/2	9,663
5 May 2001	Super League VI	9	Castleford Tigers	A	The Jungle	W	24–22	Lowes, H.Paul, R.Paul	H.Paul 6/6	8,528
11 May 2001	Super League VI	10	Leeds Rhinos	A	Headingley Stadium	W	33–14	Withers (2), Anderson, Forshaw, Vaikona	H.Paul 6/6, H.Paul 1 DG	18,242
18 May 2001	Super League VI	11	Halifax Blue Sox	H	Valley Parade	W	64–12	Pryce (3), Forshaw (2), Fielden, Gartner, Gilmour, Naylor, R.Paul, Vaikona	H.Paul 10/11	11,691
27 May 2001	Super League VI	12	Salford City Reds	H	Valley Parade	W	42–10	Gilmour (3), Anderson, Pryce, Radford, Rigon, Vaikona	H.Paul 5/8	10,907
2 June 2001	Super League VI	13	St. Helens	A	Knowsley Road	L	26–38	R.Paul (2), Gilmour, Peacock, Vaikona	H.Paul 3/5	10,428
10 June 2001	Super League VI	14	Huddersfield Giants	H	Valley Parade	W	78–18	Mackay (3), Rigon (2), Vaikona (2), Gartner, McAvoy, H.Paul, Peacock, Pryce, Vagana, Withers	H.Paul 11/14	10,886
16 June 2001	Super League VI	15	London Broncos	A	Welford Road	W	42–0	Deacon, Fielden, Gartner, Gilmour, Peacock, Rigon, Vaikona, Withers	H.Paul 5/8	5,259
24 June 2001	Super League VI	16	Wakefield Trinity Wildcats	H	Valley Parade	W	62–10	Anderson, Gartner, McAvoy, McDermott, H.Paul, R.Paul, Rigon, Vagana, Vaikona, Withers	H.Paul 8/8, Deacon 3/3	11,298
29 June 2001	Super League VI	17	Wigan Warriors	A	JJB Stadium	L	30–44	Withers (2), Anderson, McDermott, Vaikona	H.Paul 5/5	14,886
6 July 2001	Super League VI	18	Hull F.C.	H	Valley Parade	W	40–0	H.Paul (2), R.Paul (2), Deacon, Mackay, Withers	H.Paul 6/7	12,807
15 July 2001	Super League VI	19	Castleford Tigers	H	Valley Parade	W	44–4	Lowes (2), Naylor (2), Deacon, Pryce, Withers	Deacon 8/8	9,287
22 July 2001	Super League VI	20	Leeds Rhinos	H	Valley Parade	W	44–22	Pryce (2), Vaikona (2), Gartner, McAvoy, Peacock	H.Paul 7/7, Deacon 1/1	15,106
29 July 2001	Super League VI	21	Halifax Blue Sox	A	The Shay	W	52–28	Vaikona (3), Mackay (2), Anderson, Gartner, R.Paul, Pryce	H.Paul 8/9	5,982
4 August 2001	Super League VI	22	Warrington Wolves	A	Wilderspool	L	14–18	R.Paul, Radford	H.Paul 3/3	4,011
11 August 2001	Super League VI	23	Leeds Rhinos	A	Headingley Stadium	W	34–6	Naylor, H.Paul, R.Paul, Vaikona, Withers	H.Paul 7/7	13,712
17 August 2001	Super League VI	24	St. Helens	H	Valley Parade	W	27–14	Mackay, Withers	H.Paul 8/8, Deacon 3 DG	13,805
26 August 2001	Super League VI	25	Castleford Tigers	H	Valley Parade	W	56–30	Withers (3), Deacon, Gartner, Lowes, McAvoy, R.Paul, Vaikona	H.Paul 9/9, Deacon 1/1	10,469
31 August 2001	Super League VI	26	Wigan Warriors	A	JJB Stadium	L	10–16	Lowes	H.Paul 2/2, Deacon 1 DG, Lowes 1 DG	15,052
9 September 2001	Super League VI	27	Warrington Wolves	A	Wilderspool	W	84–12	Mackay (3), Withers (3), Naylor (2), Pryce (2), H.Paul, R.Paul, Peacock, Rigon	H.Paul 10/10, Deacon 4/4	8,393
15 September 2001	Super League VI	28	Leeds Rhinos	H	Valley Parade	W	62–18	Naylor (2), R.Paul (2), Withers (2), Deacon, Forshaw, Gartner, Lowes, Vaikona	H.Paul 9/11	12,863

== Challenge Cup ==
LEGEND
Win
Draw
Loss

Date	Competition	Rnd	Vrs	H/A	Venue	Result	Score	Tries	Goals	Att
11 February 2001	Cup	4th	Widnes Vikings	H	Valley Parade	W	54–10	Withers (3), Naylor (2), Anderson, Lowes, McDermott, Spruce, Vaikona	H.Paul 7/10	7,760
25 February 2001	Cup	5th	Halifax Blue Sox	A	The Shay	W	68–18	Naylor (2), Vaikona (2), Forshaw, Gartner, Gilmour, Lowes, R.Paul, Spruce, Withers	H.Paul 9/9, Deacon 3/3	6,129
11 March 2001	Cup	QF	Wakefield Trinity Wildcats	A	Belle Vue	W	38–0	Lowes (2), Withers (2), Gartner, H.Paul, Spruce	H.Paul 4/5, Deacon 1/2	5,280
1 April 2001	Cup	SF	Warrington Wolves	N	McAlpine Stadium	W	39–22	R.Paul (2), Naylor, Peacock, Spruce, Withers	H.Paul 7/7, H.Paul 1 DG	13,856
28 April 2001	Cup	Final	St. Helens	N	Twickenham Stadium	L	6–13	–	H.Paul 3/3	68,250

== Playoffs ==
LEGEND
Win
Draw
Loss

Date	Competition	Rnd	Vrs	H/A	Venue	Result	Score	Tries	Goals	Att
30 September 2001	Play-offs	QSF	Wigan Warriors	H	Valley Parade	W	24–18	R.Paul (2)	H.Paul 8/8	13,216
13 October 2001	Play-offs	GF	Wigan Warriors	N	Old Trafford	W	37–6	Withers (3), Fielden, Lowes, Mackay	H.Paul 5/5, Mackay 1/1, H.Paul 1 DG	60,164

== 2001 squad statistics ==
- Appearances and Points include (Super League, Challenge Cup and Play-offs) as of 2012.

No	Player	Position	Tries	Goals	DG	Points
1	Robbie Paul	Fullback	23	0	0	92
2	Tevita Vaikona	Wing	25	0	0	100
3	Leon Pryce	Centre	16	0	0	64
4	Nathan McAvoy	Centre	4	0	0	16
5	Michael Withers	Fullback	31	0	0	124
6	Henry Paul	Stand Off	9	208	5	457
7	Paul Deacon	Scrum-half	6	29	4	86
8	Joe Vagana	Prop	2	0	0	8
9	James Lowes	Hooker	13	0	1	53
10	Paul Anderson	Prop	8	0	0	32
11	Daniel Gartner	Second Row	14	0	0	56
12	Mike Forshaw	Loose forward	6	0	0	24
14	Lee Gilmour	Second Row	8	0	0	32
15	Shane Rigon	Centre	12	0	0	48
16	Alex Wilkinson	Wing	0	0	0	0
18	Lee Radford	Prop	2	0	0	8
19	Jamie Peacock	Second Row	8	0	0	32
20	Scott Naylor	Centre	14	0	0	56
22	Brian McDermott	Prop	3	0	0	12
23	Graham Mackay	Wing	12	1	0	50
26	Paul Sykes	Centre	0	0	0	0
27	Rob Parker	Prop	0	0	0	0
28	Stuart Spruce	Fullback	6	0	0	24
29	Stuart Fielden	Prop	3	0	0	12
