= 2002 Bradford Bulls season =

- Super League VII Rank: 2nd
- Play-off result: Runners Up
- Challenge Cup: 4th Round
- 2002 record: Wins: 25; draws: 0; losses: 7
- Points scored: For: 1001; against: 603

Team information
- Chairman: Chris Caisley
- Head Coach: Brian Noble
- Captain: Robbie Paul
- Stadium: Valley Parade
- Avg. attendance: 11,542
- High attendance: 14,271 vs. St. Helens

Top scorers
- Tries: Michael Withers (20)
- Goals: Paul Deacon (155)
- Points: Paul Deacon (336)
← 2001	List of seasons	2003 →

This article details the Bradford Bulls rugby league football club's 2002 season, the 7th season of the Super League era.

== Season review ==
February 2002

As Bradford won the 2001 Super League Grand Final they had to play the winners of the 2001 NRL Grand Final. Newcastle Knights beat Parramatta Eels 30–24 and played the Bulls in the 2002 World Club Challenge. Bradford came away with a 41–22 victory over the Australian champions thanks to a Robbie Paul double and 2 tries from Michael Withers. Bradford were knocked out of the Challenge Cup by a Ben Walker inspired Leeds Rhinos. The Bulls succumbed to a 17–4 loss.

March 2002

The Bulls started off their Super League defence with a hard fought 18–4 win over last years runners up Wigan Warriors. Bradford backed this performance up with a 38–12 win over Warrington Wolves. The Bulls continued their good start to the season by beating Widnes Vikings 22–16. Once again the Bulls overcame the challenge set before them as they recorded 4 wins from 4 games by beating Hull F.C. 32–18.

April 2002

Bradford started April with a 44–12 win over Wakefield Trinity Wildcats. New signing Lesley Vainikolo scored 2 tries to help the Bulls to a victory. The Bulls suffered their first league defeat at the hands of London Broncos as they were beaten 15–14. Bradford soon got back to winning ways as they demolished St Helens R.F.C. 54–22 with Tevita Vaikona scoring a hat-trick. They backed up this fine form with a 44–18 win over Salford City Reds.

May 2002

The Bulls started May off with a hard fought 32–8 victory against Castleford Tigers. The good run came to an end at the hands of rivals Leeds Rhinos. The Rhinos beat Bradford 28–20 at Headingley Stadium. Bradford bounced back from this defeat to beat Halifax Blue Sox 46–22. The Bulls finished May with a hard fought 28–26 win against Wigan Warriors.

June 2002

Bradford started June with a great 40–12 victory over the Warrington Wolves. The Bulls continued their good run of form with a 22–12 win against London Broncos. Bradford then demolished Salford City Reds 48–10 to stay top of the league. Their good run came to an end as the Bulls went down 34–26 to St Helens R.F.C. at Knowsley Road.

July 2002

The Bulls got back to winning ways with a 44–6 win against Widnes Vikings. Bradford then followed this win with yet another victory as they beat Wakefield Trinity Wildcats 36–18. The Bulls continued this run of form with a hard fought 25–24 win at Hull F.C. with Michael Withers kicking the decisive drop goal. Bradford finished the month with a 40–18 win against Castleford Tigers.

August 2002

Bradford started August with a bang as they beat local rivals Leeds Rhinos for the first time this year, a Lesley Vainikolo double helped the Bulls to a 46–18 victory at Valley Parade. The Bulls continued this winning streak by beating Halifax Blue Sox 25–8. Bradford's 6 game winning run was brutally ended by St Helens R.F.C. as the Saints smashed the Bulls 50–22. For the first time this season the Bulls lost two games in a row as they went down 44–14 to Castleford Tigers.

September 2002

The Bulls got back to winning ways with a 46–14 win against London Broncos. Bradford backed this up with a 20–18 win against arch-rivals Leeds Rhinos. The Bulls also beat Wigan Warriors 32–14 however due to a lower points difference Bradford slipped down to 2nd in the table behind St Helens R.F.C. with one game to go. The Bulls finished the regular rounds with a 32–18 win over Hull F.C. however the margin of victory was not enough to claim top spot in the league and Bradford finished 2nd, they finished with 46 points (same as St Helens R.F.C.) but Saints had 14 points more in the points difference column.

October 2002

Bradford faced St Helens R.F.C. in the Qualifying Semi-final at Knowsley Road, the Bulls came out on top as they narrowly defeated the Saints 28–26 in a hard fought contest. In the Grand Final the Bulls lost 19–18 to St Helens R.F.C. however the final second of the game is subject to controversy as Saints captain Chris Joynt gave himself up in a voluntary tackle (a penalty should have gone to the Bulls for this action) in a kickable range which would have given Paul Deacon the chance to win the game 20–19.

== 2002 milestones ==
- WCC: Paul Deacon reached 300 points for the Bulls.
- WCC: Lesley Vainikolo scored his 1st try for the Bulls.
- Round 2: Paul Anderson scored his 25th try and reached 100 points for the Bulls.
- Round 2: Brandon Costin scored his 1st try for the Bulls.
- Round 3: Paul Sykes kicked his 1st goal for the Bulls.
- Round 7: Tevita Vaikona scored his 5th hat-trick for the Bulls.
- Round 7: Robbie Paul became the 1st player to score 100 tries for the club and he also reached 400 points for the Bulls.
- Round 9: Jamie Peacock scored his 25th try and reached 100 points for the Bulls.
- Round 9: Paul Deacon reached 400 points for the Bulls.
- Round 10: Stuart Fielden scored his 25th try and reached 100 points for the Bulls.
- Round 13: Michael Withers scored his 75th try and reached 300 points for the Bulls.
- Round 17: Paul Deacon kicked his 200th goal and reached 500 points for the Bulls.
- Round 17: Michael Withers kicked his 1st goal for the Bulls.
- Round 18: Robbie Paul kicked his 1st goal for the Bulls.
- Round 20: Tevita Vaikona scored his 75th try and reached 300 points for the Bulls.
- Round 22: Scott Naylor scored his 50th try and reached 200 points for the Bulls.
- Round 24: Paul Deacon scored his 25th try for the Bulls.
- Round 25: Nathan McAvoy scored his 50th try and reached 200 points for the Bulls.
- Round 27: Paul Deacon reached 600 points for the Bulls.

== Table ==
Pos	Team	Pld	W	D	L	PF	PA	PD	Pts	Qualification
1	St Helens (L, C)	28	23	0	5	927	522	+405	46	Semi-final
2	Bradford Bulls	28	23	0	5	910	519	+391	46	Semi-final
3	Wigan Warriors	28	19	1	8	817	475	+342	39	Elimination play-offs
4	Leeds Rhinos	28	17	0	11	865	700	+165	34	Elimination play-offs
5	Hull F.C.	28	16	0	12	742	674	+68	32	Elimination play-offs
6	Castleford Tigers	28	14	2	12	736	615	+121	30	Elimination play-offs
7	Widnes Vikings	28	14	1	13	590	716	−126	29	
8	London Broncos	28	13	1	14	661	635	+26	27	
9	Halifax Blue Sox	28	8	0	20	558	856	−298	16	
10	Warrington Wolves	28	7	0	21	483	878	−395	14	
11	Wakefield Trinity Wildcats	28	5	2	21	566	899	−333	12	
12	Salford City Reds (R)	28	5	1	22	490	856	−366	11	Relegation to National League One

Source: Rugby League Project
Rules for classification: 1) Points; 2) Points difference; 3) Number of points scored;
(C) Champions; (L) League Leaders' Shield Winners; (R) Relegated

== World Club Challenge ==
LEGEND
Win
Draw
Loss

Date	Competition	Vrs	H/A	Venue	Result	Score	Tries	Goals	Att
1 February 2002	WCC	Newcastle Knights	N	McAlpine Stadium	W	41–26	Paul (2), Gartner, Withers (2), Vainikolo	Deacon 8/8, Deacon 1 DG	21,113

2002 World Club Challenge Teams
Bradford Bulls	positions	Newcastle Knights
6. Michael Withers	Fullback	1. Robbie O'Davis
2. Tevita Vaikona	Winger	2. Joshua Smith
20. Scott Naylor	Centre	3. Matthew Gidley
14. Lee Gilmour	Centre	4. Mark Hughes
5. Lesley Vainikolo	Winger	5. Kurt Gidley
1. Robbie Paul	Stand off	6. Sean Rudder
7. Paul Deacon	Scrum half	7. Andrew Johns
8. Joe Vagana	Prop	8. Josh Perry
9. James Lowes	Hooker	9. Danny Buderus
22. Brian McDermott	Prop	10. Matt Parsons
11. Daniel Gartner	2nd Row	11. Steve Simpson
12. Jamie Peacock	2nd Row	12. Daniel Abraham
13. Mike Forshaw	Loose forward	13. Bill Peden
3. Leon Pryce	Interchange	14. Matthew Jobson
10. Paul Anderson	Interchange	15. Clinton O'Brien
15. Brandon Costin	Interchange	16. John Morris
29. Stuart Fielden	Interchange	17. Clint Newton
Brian Noble	Coach	Michael Hagan

== 2002 fixtures and results ==
LEGEND
Win
Draw
Loss

2002 Tetley's Super League

Date	Competition	Rnd	Vrs	H/A	Venue	Result	Score	Tries	Goals	Att
1 March 2002	Super League VII	1	Wigan Warriors	A	JJB Stadium	W	18–4	Forshaw, Gilmour, Vaikona	Deacon 3/3	14,170
10 March 2002	Super League VII	2	Warrington Wolves	H	Valley Parade	W	38–12	Anderson, Costin, Gartner, Gilmour, McAvoy, Vaikona, Withers	Deacon 5/7	13,876
24 March 2002	Super League VII	3	Widnes Vikings	A	Halton Stadium	W	22–16	Lowes (2), McAvoy, McDermott	Sykes 3/4	8,844
28 March 2002	Super League VII	4	Hull F.C.	H	Valley Parade	W	32–18	Anderson, Gilmour, McAvoy, Vagana, Vaikona	Deacon 6/6	13,268
1 April 2002	Super League VII	5	Wakefield Trinity Wildcats	A	Belle Vue	W	44–12	McAvoy (2), Naylor (2), Vainikolo (2), Costin, Pryce	Deacon 6/8	6,647
7 April 2002	Super League VII	6	London Broncos	A	Griffin Park	L	14–15	Costin (2), Vaikona	Deacon 1/3	4,605
20 April 2002	Super League VII	7	St. Helens	H	Valley Parade	W	54–22	Vaikona (3), Fielden, Forshaw, Gilmour, Naylor, Paul, Peacock, Vainikolo	Deacon 7/10	14,271
29 April 2002	Super League VII	8	Salford City Reds	H	Valley Parade	W	44–18	Lowes (2), Anderson, McDermott, Naylor, Pryce, Radford	Deacon 8/8	9,652
3 May 2002	Super League VII	9	Castleford Tigers	A	The Jungle	W	32–8	McAvoy (2), Gilmour, Peacock	Deacon 8/8	7,416
10 May 2002	Super League VII	10	Leeds Rhinos	A	Headingley Stadium	L	20–28	Fielden, Paul, Vaikona	Deacon 4/4	18,305
17 May 2002	Super League VII	11	Halifax Blue Sox	H	Valley Parade	W	46–22	Deacon (2), Withers (2), Naylor, Paul, Radford, Vaikona	Deacon 7/8	10,762
24 May 2002	Super League VII	12	Wigan Warriors	H	Valley Parade	W	28–26	Withers (2), McAvoy, Naylor, Vaikona	Deacon 4/5	13,314
2 June 2002	Super League VII	13	Warrington Wolves	A	Wilderspool	W	40–12	Vaikona (2), Deacon, Forshaw, Naylor, Paul, Withers	Deacon 6/7	6,619
7 June 2002	Super League VII	14	London Broncos	H	Valley Parade	W	22–12	Paul, Withers	Deacon 7/7	9,216
23 June 2002	Super League VII	15	Salford City Reds	A	The Willows	W	48–10	Gilmour (2), Vaikona (2), Costin, Gartner, Paul, Pryce	Deacon 8/8	4,806
28 June 2002	Super League VII	16	St. Helens	A	Knowsley Road	L	26–34	Costin (2), Vaikona, Withers	Deacon 5/5	12,297
4 July 2002	Super League VII	17	Widnes Vikings	H	Valley Parade	W	44–6	Lowes (2), Paul (2), Gartner, McDermott, Vainikolo, Withers	Deacon 5/7, Withers 1/1	10,264
12 July 2002	Super League VII	18	Wakefield Trinity Wildcats	H	Valley Parade	W	36–18	Forshaw, Gartner, McAvoy, Naylor, Vainikolo, Withers	Withers 5/5, Paul 1/1	8,288
19 July 2002	Super League VII	19	Hull F.C.	A	The Boulevard	W	25–24	Fielden, Paul, Pryce	Deacon 6/6, Withers 1 DG	6,257
26 July 2002	Super League VII	20	Castleford Tigers	H	Valley Parade	W	40–18	Gilmour, Lowes, McDermott, Naylor, Vaikona, Vainikolo, Withers	Deacon 6/7	9,316
2 August 2002	Super League VII	21	Leeds Rhinos	H	Valley Parade	W	46–18	Vainikolo (2), Fielden, Gilmour, Lowes, Paul, Vaikona, Withers	Deacon 6/7, Withers 1/1	13,631
9 August 2002	Super League VII	22	Halifax Blue Sox	A	The Shay	W	25–8	Naylor (2), McAvoy, Pryce	Deacon 4/4, Deacon 1 DG	4,170
16 August 2002	Super League VII	23	St. Helens	H	Valley Parade	L	22–50	Fielden (2), Naylor	Deacon 5/5	13,948
25 August 2002	Super League VII	24	Castleford Tigers	A	The Jungle	L	14–44	Deacon, Pryce	Deacon 2/2, Withers 1/1	6,697
1 September 2002	Super League VII	25	London Broncos	H	Valley Parade	W	46–14	McAvoy (2), Pryce (2), Withers (2), Lowes, Vaikona	Deacon 7/8	8,965
6 September 2002	Super League VII	26	Leeds Rhinos	A	Headingley Stadium	W	20–18	Gartner, Paul, Pryce, Withers	Deacon 2/4	15,328
14 September 2002	Super League VII	27	Wigan Warriors	H	Valley Parade	W	32–14	Withers (2), Fielden, Vainikolo	Deacon 8/8	12,576
20 September 2002	Super League VII	28	Hull F.C.	A	The Boulevard	W	32–18	McAvoy (2), Deacon, Gartner, Paul, Vaikona	Deacon 4/6	8,630

== Challenge Cup ==
LEGEND
Win
Draw
Loss

Date	Competition	Rnd	Vrs	H/A	Venue	Result	Score	Tries	Goals	Att
9 February 2002	Cup	4th	Leeds Rhinos	H	Valley Parade	L	4–17	Gartner	Deacon 0/1	11,781

== Playoffs ==
LEGEND
Win
Draw
Loss

Date	Competition	Rnd	Vrs	H/A	Venue	Result	Score	Tries	Goals	Att
5 October 2002	Play-offs	QSF	St. Helens	A	Knowsley Road	W	28–26	Costin, Deacon, Forshaw, Gartner, Vainikolo	Deacon 4/5	15,100
19 October 2002	Play-offs	GF	St. Helens	N	Old Trafford	L	18–19	Naylor, Paul, Withers	Deacon 3/4	61,138

== 2002 squad statistics ==
- Appearances and Points include (Super League, Challenge Cup and Play-offs) as of 2012.

No	Player	Position	Tries	Goals	DG	Points
1	Robbie Paul	Fullback	15	1	0	62
2	Tevita Vaikona	Wing	19	0	0	76
3	Leon Pryce	Centre	9	0	0	36
4	Nathan McAvoy	Centre	14	0	0	56
5	Lesley Vainikolo	Wing	11	0	0	44
6	Michael Withers	Fullback	20	8	1	97
7	Paul Deacon	Scrum-half	6	155	2	336
8	Joe Vagana	Prop	1	0	0	4
9	James Lowes	Hooker	9	0	0	36
10	Paul Anderson	Prop	3	0	0	12
11	Daniel Gartner	Second row	9	0	0	36
12	Jamie Peacock	Second row	2	0	0	8
13	Mike Forshaw	Loose forward	5	0	0	20
14	Lee Gilmour	Centre	9	0	0	36
15	Brandon Costin	Stand off	8	0	0	32
16	Alex Wilkinson	Wing	0	0	0	0
18	Lee Radford	Second row	2	0	0	8
19	Jamie Langley	Loose forward	0	0	0	0
20	Scott Naylor	Centre	13	0	0	52
22	Brian McDermott	Prop	4	0	0	16
26	Paul Sykes	Centre	0	3	0	6
27	Rob Parker	Prop	0	0	0	0
29	Stuart Fielden	Prop	7	0	0	28
30	Richard Moore	Prop	0	0	0	0
