= 2000 Bradford Bulls season =

- Super League V Rank: 3rd
- Play-off result: Semi-final
- Challenge Cup: Winners
- 2000 record: Wins: 26; draws: 3; losses: 7
- Points scored: For: 1247; against: 536

Team information
- Chairman: Chris Caisley
- Head Coach: Matthew Elliott
- Captain: Robbie Paul
- Stadium: Odsal Stadium
- Avg. attendance: 14,052
- High attendance: 21,237 vs. Leeds Rhinos

Top scorers
- Tries: Robbie Paul (19)
- Goals: Henry Paul (179)
- Points: Henry Paul (404)
← 1999	List of seasons	2001 →

This article details the Bradford Bulls rugby league football club's 2000 season, the 5th season of the Super League era.

== Season review ==
February 2000

Bradford kicked off the 2000 season with a 32–4 win over Huddersfield Giants in the 4th round of the Challenge Cup, the Bulls followed this win up by smashing Wakefield Trinity Wildcats 46–0 in the 5th round.

March 2000

The Bulls started Super League V with a 32–10 win over premiership winners St. Helens at Knowsley Road. Bradford's quest to become cup winners continued with a hard fought 28–18 win against Halifax. The Bulls resumed their defence of the Super League League Leader's Shield with a 58–4 win against Warrington Wolves. Warrington Wolves were once again on the end of a defeat as the Bulls beat them the following week 44–10 in the semi-final of the Challenge Cup.

April 2000

Bradford continued their great run of form with an astounding performance to beat Huddersfield Giants 60–2 at the McAlpine Stadium, the star of the game being Henry Paul who was immaculate with the boot kicking 10 goals. The backed this performance up at home with a 44–12 win against Castleford Tigers. Salford City Reds were the next team to suffer defeat at the hands of Bradford going down 52–1 at The Willows. The week before the Challenge Cup Final the Bulls hosted London Broncos, the Bulls won the game 32–12. Bradford travelled up to Scotland for the Challenge Cup Final against arch rivals Leeds Rhinos. After a hard fought game the Bulls came out 24–18 winners after Nathan McAvoy scored an outstanding individual try to give Bradford the win and their 4th Challenge Cup (1st since Super League began).

May 2000

The first game of May for Bradford was against Hull FC, both sides shared the points as the game ended in an 8–8 draw. The Bulls got back to winning ways as they beat Wakefield Trinity Wildcats 44–16. The next week they demolished a poor Halifax Blue Sox 62–2 with Justin Brooker grabbing a hat-trick. Leeds Rhinos were next up for the Bulls, Bradford expected a hard match after they beat Leeds in the Challenge Cup Final however the Bulls ran rampant and won the game 44–2. Their first loss of the season came against Warrington Wolves as the Wolves claimed a 42–32 win over Bradford.

June 2000

Bradford started June with two hard games against St Helens R.F.C. and Wigan Warriors. The Bulls managed to sneak a 17–16 win against the Saints thanks to a Paul Deacon drop goal. The points were shared at the JJB Stadium as Henry Paul's goal kicked helped the Bulls to draw 12–12. The hard start ended with the visit of Huddersfield Giants, Bradford dispatched the Giants 48–20 with Tevita Vaikona grabbing a hat-trick. They backed up this win with a 39–10 win at Castleford Tigers. The Bulls set a Super League record as they embarrassed Salford City Reds at Odsal Stadium, the Paul brothers were the star players with Robbie scoring 4 tries and Henry scoring a try and kicking 14 goals in the 96–16 win. Bradford finished a tough month with a 30–18 loss to Wigan Warriors.

July 2000

Bradford had a close 24–16 victory against London Broncos to get over their loss to Wigan the previous month. The Bulls soon got back to playing quality rugby as they took Hull F.C. apart and beat the 56–6 at Odsal before grinding out a 30–20 win against Wakefield Trinity Wildcats the following week. However they once again finished a month with a loss as arch-rivals Leeds Rhinos took the points by winning 28–26 in front of at 21,237 crowd at Odsal Stadium.

August 2000

Bradford drew 20–20 against Halifax Blue Sox at the new The Shay to start August. They backed this draw up with a convincing 28–8 win against Castleford Tigers, this gave the Bulls some confidence and it showed as they destroyed Huddersfield Giants 52–20 the following week. Wigan Warriors beat the Bulls 20–19 at Odsal Stadium which killed off Bradford's hopes of finishing top of the league.

September 2000

The Bulls started September with a hard fought 25–18 win over Halifax Blue Sox, a late Paul Deacon drop goal secured the points for Bradford. They also got revenge over rivals Leeds Rhinos as a Henry Paul penalty ensured the Bulls won 14–12. However they finished the season on a low as an under strength Bradford side lost 25–12 to Hull F.C. which ensured that Bradford finished 3rd in the league. The Bulls lost the Qualifying Play-off game 16–11 to St Helens R.F.C., a very late Chris Joynt try (the infamous Wide to West play) ensures Saints won the match. Bradford got back on track as they beat Leeds Rhinos 46–12 in the Elimination Semi-final.

October 2000

Bradford's season ended in the Final Eliminator as they lost 40–12 against Wigan Warriors.

== 2000 milestones ==
- CCR5: Michael Withers scored his 3rd hat-trick and reached 100 points for the Bulls.
- CCR5: Brad Mackay and Hudson Smith scored their 1st tries for the Bulls.
- Round 2: Justin Brooker scored his 1st try for the Bulls.
- Round 2: Nathan McAvoy scored his 25th try and reached 100 points for the Bulls.
- Round 3: Henry Paul reached 200 points for the Bulls.
- Round 6: Stuart Spruce scored his 50th try and reached 200 points for the Bulls.
- Round 9: Justin Brooker scored his 1st hat-trick for the Bulls.
- Round 9: Mike Forshaw scored his 25th try and reached 100 points for the Bulls.
- Round 9: Henry Paul kicked his 100th goal for the Bulls.
- Round 11: Henry Paul reached 300 points for the Bulls.
- Round 14: Tevita Vaikona scored his 2nd hat-trick for the Bulls.
- Round 14: Paul Sykes scored his 1st try for the Bulls.
- Round 16: Rob Parker, Lee Radford and Alex Wilkinson all scored their 1st tries for the Bulls.
- Round 16: Robbie Paul scored his 1st four-try haul and his 6th hat-trick for the Bulls.
- Round 16: Jamie Peacock scored his 1st hat-trick for the Bulls.
- Round 19: Henry Paul reached 400 points for the Bulls.
- Round 24: Paul Deacon reached 200 points for the Bulls.
- Round 25: Scott Naylor scored his 25th try and reached 100 points for the Bulls.
- Round 28: Gareth Stanley scored his 1st try for the Bulls.
- Qualifying Play-off: Henry Paul kicked his 200th goal for the Bulls.
- Elimination Semi-final: Henry Paul reached 500 points for the Bulls.

== Table ==
Super League V
Pos	Team	Pld	W	D	L	PF	PA	PD	Pts	Qualification
1	Wigan Warriors (L)	28	24	1	3	960	405	+555	49	Semi Final
2	St Helens (C)	28	23	0	5	988	627	+361	46	Qualifying Semi Final
3	Bradford Bulls	28	20	3	5	1004	408	+596	43	Qualifying Semi Final
4	Leeds Rhinos	28	17	0	11	692	626	+66	34	Elimination Semi Final
5	Castleford Tigers	28	17	0	11	585	571	+14	34	Elimination Semi Final
6	Warrington Wolves	28	13	0	15	735	817	−82	26	
7	Hull F.C.	28	12	1	15	630	681	−51	25	
8	Halifax Blue Sox	28	11	1	16	664	703	−39	23	
9	Salford City Reds	28	10	0	18	542	910	−368	20	
10	Wakefield Trinity Wildcats	28	8	0	20	557	771	−214	16	
11	London Broncos	28	6	0	22	456	770	−314	12	
12	Huddersfield-Sheffield Giants	28	4	0	24	502	1026	−524	8	

Source: Rugby League Project
Rules for classification: 1) Points; 2) Points difference; 3) Number of points scored;
(C) Champions; (L) League Leaders

== 2000 Fixtures and results ==
LEGEND
Win
Draw
Loss

2000 Tetley's Bitter Super League

Date	Competition	Rnd	Vrs	H/A	Venue	Result	Score	Tries	Goals	Att
3 March 2000	Super League V	1	St. Helens	A	Knowsley Road	W	32–10	Lowes (2), McAvoy, R.Paul, Withers	H.Paul 6/6	10,128
19 March 2000	Super League V	2	Warrington Wolves	H	Odsal Stadium	W	58–4	Brooker (2), R.Paul (2), Anderson, Forshaw, Lowes, Mackay, McAvoy, H.Paul, Spruce	H.Paul 7/11	17,127
2 April 2000	Super League V	3	Huddersfield Giants	A	McAlpine Stadium	W	60–2	Brooker (2), McAvoy (2), Anderson, Boyle, Fielden, Mackay, R.Paul, Vaikona	H.Paul 10/10	7,083
9 April 2000	Super League V	4	Castleford Tigers	H	Odsal Stadium	W	44–12	Lowes (2), Fielden, McAvoy, H.Paul, Spruce, Withers	H.Paul 7/7, H.Paul 1 DG, Lowes 1 DG	15,237
16 April 2000	Super League V	5	Salford City Reds	A	The Willows	W	52–1	Withers (2), Boyle, Mackay, McAvoy, McDermott, Naylor, H.Paul, Spruce	Deacon 8/9	6,468
21 April 2000	Super League V	6	London Broncos	H	Odsal Stadium	W	32–12	Spruce (2), Anderson, Lowes, Naylor	Deacon 6/6	13,239
3 May 2000	Super League V	7	Hull F.C.	A	The Boulevard	D	8–8	Pryce	Deacon 2/2	7,886
7 May 2000	Super League V	8	Wakefield Trinity Wildcats	H	Odsal Stadium	W	44–16	Brooker, Deacon, Lowes, Mackay, Naylor, R.Paul, Smith, Spruce	H.Paul 6/8	15,276
12 May 2000	Super League V	9	Halifax Blue Sox	H	Odsal Stadium	W	62–2	Brooker (3), Naylor (2), Spruce (2), Anderson, Fielden, Forshaw, H.Paul	H.Paul 9/11	14,084
19 May 2000	Super League V	10	Leeds Rhinos	A	Headingley Stadium	W	44–2	Spruce (2), Lowes, Mackay, McAvoy, R.Paul, Pryce	H.Paul 8/8	18,769
28 May 2000	Super League V	11	Warrington Wolves	A	Wilderspool Stadium	L	32–42	Anderson (2), Naylor, R.Paul, Pryce	H.Paul 6/6	8,302
2 June 2000	Super League V	12	St. Helens	H	Odsal Stadium	W	17–16	Fielden (2), Boyle	H.Paul 2/3, Deacon 1 DG	13,237
7 June 2000	Super League V	13	Wigan Warriors	A	JJB Stadium	D	12–12	Deacon	H.Paul 4/4	17,365
11 June 2000	Super League V	14	Huddersfield Giants	H	Odsal Stadium	W	48–20	Vaikona (3), Sykes (2), Boyle, Deacon, McDermott, Peacock	H.Paul 6/9	11,565
16 June 2000	Super League V	15	Castleford Tigers	A	The Jungle	W	39–10	Anderson (2), Deacon, Lowes, Naylor, R.Paul	H.Paul 7/7, Boyle 1 DG	–
25 June 2000	Super League V	16	Salford City Reds	H	Odsal Stadium	W	96–16	R.Paul (4), Peacock (3), Brooker (2), Deacon, Mackay, McDermott, Naylor, Parker, H.Paul, Radford, Wilkinson	H.Paul 14/17	11,596
30 June 2000	Super League V	17	Wigan Warriors	H	Odsal Stadium	L	18–30	Brooker, Deacon, Mackay	H.Paul 3/3	18,815
9 July 2000	Super League V	18	London Broncos	A	The Valley	W	24–16	R.Paul, H.Paul, Peacock, Vaikona	H.Paul 4/4	4,063
14 July 2000	Super League V	19	Hull F.C.	H	Odsal Stadium	W	56–6	Fielden (2), McAvoy (2), Spruce (2), Naylor, R.Paul, Peacock, Pryce	H.Paul 8/10	10,778
23 July 2000	Super League V	20	Wakefield Trinity Wildcats	A	Belle Vue	W	30–20	Spruce (2), Fielden, Naylor, Pryce	H.Paul 5/5	6,531
30 July 2000	Super League V	21	Leeds Rhinos	H	Odsal Stadium	L	26–28	R.Paul (2), Lowes, Naylor	H.Paul 1/1, Deacon 4/4	21,237
6 August 2000	Super League V	22	Halifax Blue Sox	A	The Shay	D	20–20	Naylor (2)	H.Paul 6/6	7,106
11 August 2000	Super League V	23	Castleford Tigers	H	Odsal Stadium	W	28–8	Deacon, Mackay, Spruce, Vaikona, Withers	H.Paul 4/5	11,302
18 August 2000	Super League V	24	Huddersfield Giants	H	Odsal Stadium	W	52–20	McDermott (2), H.Paul (2), Deacon, Peacock, Spruce, Vaikona, Withers	H.Paul 8/9	10,164
27 August 2000	Super League V	25	Wigan Warriors	A	JJB Stadium	L	19–20	Lowes, Naylor, Pryce	H.Paul 3/3, Deacon 1 DG	17,737
3 September 2000	Super League V	26	Halifax Blue Sox	A	The Shay	W	25–18	Deacon, Lowes, H.Paul, Withers	H.Paul 4/4, Deacon 1 DG	8,244
8 September 2000	Super League V	27	Leeds Rhinos	H	Odsal Stadium	W	14–12	Smith, Vaikona	H.Paul 3/3	19,623
17 September 2000	Super League V	28	Hull F.C.	A	The Boulevard	L	12–25	McAvoy, Stanley	Deacon 2/2	6,160

== Challenge Cup ==
LEGEND
Win
Draw
Loss

Date	Competition	Rnd	Vrs	H/A	Venue	Result	Score	Tries	Goals	Att
12 February 2000	Cup	4th	Huddersfield Giants	H	Odsal Stadium	W	32–4	Pryce (2), McAvoy, Naylor, Withers	H.Paul 6/6	6,467
27 February 2000	Cup	5th	Wakefield Trinity Wildcats	A	Belle Vue	W	46–0	Withers (3), McAvoy (2), Anderson, Mackay, Naylor, Smith	H.Paul 5/9	8,005
12 March 2000	Cup	QF	Halifax Blue Sox	A	The Shay	W	28–18	Fielden, Forshaw, R.Paul, Withers	H.Paul 6/6	9,827
25 March 2000	Cup	SF	Warrington Wolves	N	Headingley Stadium	W	44–20	Brooker, Naylor, H.Paul, R.Paul, Peacock, Spruce, Withers	H.Paul 8/8	11,894
29 April 2000	Cup	Final	Leeds Rhinos	N	Murrayfield Stadium	W	24–18	Withers (2), Fielden, McAvoy	H.Paul 4/4	67,247

== Playoffs ==
LEGEND
Win
Draw
Loss

Date	Competition	Rnd	Vrs	H/A	Venue	Result	Score	Tries	Goals	Att
22 September 2000	Play-offs	QPO	St. Helens	A	Knowsley Road	L	11–16	Peacock, Pryce	H.Paul 1/2, H.Paul 1 DG	8,864
30 September 2000	Play-offs	ESF	Leeds Rhinos	H	Odsal Stadium	W	46–12	Pryce (3), Anderson, Boyle, Fielden, H.Paul, R.Paul	H.Paul 6/7, Deacon 1/1	15,077
7 October 2000	Play-offs	SF	Wigan Warriors	A	JJB Stadium	L	12–40	Anderson, Naylor	H.Paul 2/2	14,620

== 2000 squad statistics ==
- Appearances and Points include (Super League, Challenge Cup and Play-offs) as of 2012.

No	Player	Position	Tries	Goals	DG	Points
1	Robbie Paul	Fullback	19	0	0	76
2	Tevita Vaikona	Wing	8	0	0	32
3	Leon Pryce	Centre	12	0	0	48
4	Nathan McAvoy	Centre	14	0	0	56
5	Michael Withers	Wing	15	0	0	60
6	Henry Paul	Stand Off	11	179	2	404
7	Paul Deacon	Scrum-half	9	23	3	85
8	Neil Harmon	Prop	0	0	0	0
9	James Lowes	Hooker	12	0	1	49
10	Paul Anderson	Prop	11	0	0	44
11	David Boyle	Second Row	5	0	1	21
12	Mike Forshaw	Second Row	3	0	0	12
13	Brad Mackay	Loose forward	9	0	0	36
14	Justin Brooker	Centre	12	0	0	48
15	Hudson Smith	Second Row	3	0	0	12
16	Alex Wilkinson	Wing	1	0	0	4
17	Chris Birchall	Second Row	0	0	0	0
18	Lee Radford	Prop	1	0	0	4
19	Jamie Peacock	Second Row	9	0	0	36
20	Scott Naylor	Centre	18	0	0	72
22	Brian McDermott	Prop	5	0	0	20
23	Bernard Dwyer	Second Row	0	0	0	0
24	Gareth Stanley	Hooker	1	0	0	4
25	Craig McDowell	Second Row	0	0	0	0
26	Paul Sykes	Centre	2	0	0	8
28	Stuart Spruce	Fullback	17	0	0	68
29	Stuart Fielden	Prop	11	0	0	44
