= 2001 Challenge Cup =

Rugby league tournament held in 2001

2001 Silk Cut Challenge Cup
- Duration: 8 Rounds
- Highest attendance: 68,250
- Broadcast partners: BBC Sport
- Winners: St. Helens
- Runners-up: Bradford Bulls
- Biggest home win: 76 – 0 Keighley vs Rochdale Mayfield (Round 3)
- Biggest away win: 10 – 106 Leeds at Swinton (Round 4)
- Lance Todd Trophy: Sean Long

The 2001 Challenge Cup (officially known as the 2001 Silk Cut Challenge Cup for sponsorship reasons) is a rugby league football tournament which began its preliminary stages in December 2000 and ended with the final on 28 April 2001. Bradford Bulls were the reigning champions, following their 24–18 victory over Leeds Rhinos in the 2000 Challenge Cup at Murrayfield Stadium.

== Round 1 ==
Ties were scheduled to be played over the weekend of 2–3 December 2000, although two matches did not take place until 9 and 16 December.

Home	Score	Away	Match information
Home	Score	Away	Date and time	Venue	Referee	Attendance
Cottingham Tigers	2–17	Hensingham ARLFC	2 December 2000
Dewsbury Moor ARLFC	17–18	Eastmoor ARLFC	2 December 2000
East Leeds	14–12	Elland ARLFC	2 December 2000
Ecces ARLFC	25–16	RL Conference Lionhearts	2 December 2000
Hull Dockers	28–4	West Bowling ARLFC	2 December 2000
Leigh East	10–15	Shaw Cross RLFC	2 December 2000
London Skolars	18–10	Crosfields ARLFC	2 December 2000
Milford Marlins	16–26	Wigan St Judes	2 December 2000
Millom RLFC	34–8	Normanton Knights	2 December 2000
Newcastle University	36–22	Hunslet Warriors	2 December 2000
Rochdale Mayfield	32–16	Castleford Panthers	2 December 2000
Royal Air Force	12–32	Heworth	2 December 2000
Royal Navy	18–6	Waterhead	2 December 2000
Hillsborough Hawks	10–18	Featherstone Lions	2 December 2000
Siddal	28–8	Dewsbury Celtic	2 December 2000
Thatto Heath ALRFC	24–22	Keighley Albion & Bingley	2 December 2000
Widnes St Maries	38–18	Blackbrook	2 December 2000
York Acorn	0–18	Halton Simms Cross	2 December 2000
Clayton ARLFC	10–20	Leeds Metropolitan University	3 December 2000
New Earswick	36–20	Bangor Vikings	3 December 2000
Welsh Students	15–18	Askam ARLFC	3 December 2000
Wigan Rose Bridge	72–0	Glasgow Bulls	3 December 2000
Queensbury	24–0	Charleston Knights	9 December 2000
Wath Brow Hornets	41–6	The Army	16 December 2000

== Round 2 ==
Ties were due to be played over the weekend of 16–17 December 2000 but the round was not completed until 13 January 2001.

Home	Score	Away	Match information
Home	Score	Away	Date and time	Venue	Referee	Attendance
Askam ARLFC	12–2	Millom	16 December 2000
East Leeds	28–10	London Skolars	16 December 2000
Halton Simms Cross	8–0	Shaw Cross	16 December 2000
New Earswick	11–7	Thatto Heath	16 December 2000
Newcastle University	8–51	Leigh Miners Rangers	16 December 2000
Rochdale Mayfield	15–10	Dudley Hill	16 December 2000
Royal Navy	12–13^{A}	Eccles ALRFC	16 December 2000
Saddleworth ALRFC	0–30	Oldham St Annes	16 December 2000
Siddal	22–12	Hull Dockers	16 December 2000
Skirlaugh	16–38	Oulton Raiders	16 December 2000
Thornhill Trojans	18–10	Leeds Metropolitan University	16 December 2000
Walney Central	4–13	Queensbury ALRFC	16 December 2000
Wigan Rose Bridge	26–8	Redhill ARLFC	16 December 2000
Wigan St Judes	15–9	Widnes St Maries	16 December 2000
Wigan St Patricks	4–3	Ideal Isberg	16 December 2000
Eastmoor Dragons	0–34	West Hull	6 January 2001
Heworth	12–10	Featherstone Lions	6 January 2001
Wath Brow Hornets	8–11	Castleford Lock Lane	6 January 2001
Woolston Rovers	32–11	Hensingham ALRFC	13 January 2001

Notes

A. After extra time

== Round 3 ==
Ties were played over the weekend of 26–28 January 2001.

Home	Score	Away	Match information
Home	Score	Away	Date and time	Venue	Referee	Attendance
Halton Simms Cross	10–42	Villeneuve Leopards	26 January 2001	Auto Quest Stadium	Karl Kirkpatrick	809
Dewsbury Rams	48–10	Leigh Miners Rangers	27 January 2001	The Rams Stadium	Nick Oddy	1,260
Wigan Rose Bridge	0–52	York Wasps	27 January 2001	Spotland Stadium	Julian King	731
Barrow Border Raiders	40–16	Askam ARLFC	28 January 2001	Craven Park	Grant Maxwell	2,092
Batley Bulldogs	70–0	Heworth	28 January 2001	Mount Pleasant	Ian Chatterton	573
Chorley Lynx	8–22	Woolston Rovers	28 January 2001	Victory Park	Robert Connolly	559
Doncaster Dragons	44–14	Siddal	28 January 2001	Belle Vue	Peter Taberner	1,341
Featherstone Rovers	56–0	Eccles ALRFC	28 January 2001	Lionheart Stadium	Paul Lee	1,045
Gateshead Thunder	34–20	Wigan St Judes	28 January 2001	Gateshead International Stadium	Steve Ganson	501
Hull Kingston Rovers	44–0	Toulouse Spacers	28 January 2001	Craven Park	Steve Nicholson	1,649
Hunslet Hawks	38–6	Thornhill Trojans	28 January 2001	South Leeds Stadium	Ben Thaler	629
Keighley Cougars	76–0	Rochdale Mayfield	28 January 2001	Cougar Park	Ron Laughton	1,764
Leigh Centurions	28–5	West Hull	28 January 2001	Hilton Park	Russell Smith	1,547
Oldham R.L.F.C.	64–0	Queensbury ARLFC	28 January 2001	Boundary Park	Colin Morris	1,559
Sheffield Eagles	42–0	East Leeds	28 January 2001	Don Valley Stadium	Steve Addy	778
Swinton Lions	44–12	New Earswick	28 January 2001	Gigg Lane	John Farrell	478
Whitehaven	34–16	Oldham St Annes	28 January 2001	Recreation Ground	Darren Gillespie	616
Widnes Vikings	70–2	Wigan St Patricks	28 January 2001	Auto Quest Stadium	Richard Silverwood	2,465
Workington Town	38–0	Castleford Lock Lane	28 January 2001	Derwent Park	Mike Dawber	867
York Wasps	24–12	Oulton Raiders	28 January 2001	Huntington Stadium	Paul Carr	914

== Round 4 ==
Ties were played between 10–14 February 2001

Home	Score	Away	Match information
Home	Score	Away	Date and time	Venue	Referee	Attendance
St. Helens	22–8	Wigan Warriors	10 February 2001	Knowsley Road	Stuart Cummings	13,593
Barrow Border Raiders	4–56	Halifax Blue Sox	11 February 2001	Craven Park	Richard Silverwood	2,160
Bradford Bulls	54–10	Widnes Vikings	11 February 2001	Odsal Stadium	Ian Smith	7,760
Dewsbury Rams	4–18	Castleford Tigers	11 February 2001	Ram Stadium	Karl Kirkpatrick	3,384
Doncaster Dragons	14–12	Sheffield Eagles	11 February 2001	Belle Vue	John Farrell	1,344
Huddersfield Giants	28–6	Featherstone Rovers	11 February 2001	Alfred McAlpine Stadium	Steve Ganson	2,527
Keighley Cougars	20–34	Hull F.C.	11 February 2001	Cougar Park	Robert Connolly	4,401
Leigh Centurions	16–12	Salford City Reds	11 February 2001	Hilton Park	Russell Smith	6,408
London Broncos	44–6	Batley Bulldogs	11 February 2001	Broadfield Stadium	Steve Addy	1,204
Swinton Lions	10–106	Leeds Rhinos	11 February 2001	Gigg Lane	Colin Morris	3,239
Warrington Wolves	48–6	Woolston Rovers	11 February 2001	Wilderspool Stadium	Steve Nicholson	6,008
Workington Town	6–56	Wakefield Trinity Wildcats	11 February 2001	Derwent Park	Paul Lee	1,710
York Wasps	8–22	Villeneuve Leopards	11 February 2001	Huntington Stadium	Julian King	471
Oldham R.L.F.C.	17–6	Hull Kingston Rovers	13 February 2001	Boundary Park		2,008
Rochdale Hornets	38–4	Hunslet Hawks	13 February 2001	Spotland Stadium	Nick Oddy	605
Gateshead Thunder	0–56	Whitehaven	14 February 2001	Gateshead International Stadium

== Round 5 ==
The fifth round fixtures were played over the weekend of 24–25 February 2001.

Home	Score	Away	Match information
Home	Score	Away	Date and time	Venue	Referee	Attendance
Castleford Tigers	12–42	Leeds Rhinos	24 February 2001	Wheldon Road	Robert Connolly	11,418
Halifax Blue Sox	18–68	Bradford Bulls	25 February 2001	The Shay	Russell Smith	6,129
Huddersfield Giants	38–24	Doncaster Dragons	25 February 2001	Alfred McAlpine Stadium	Ian Smith	2,176
Hull F.C.	30–20	London Broncos	25 February 2001	The Boulevard	Stuart Cummings	6,701
Oldham R.L.F.C.	6–26	Wakefield Trinity Wildcats	25 February 2001	Boundary Park	Nick Oddy	3,071
Rochdale Hornets	19–26	Villeneuve Leopards	25 February 2001	Spotland Stadium	Peter Taberner	817
Warrington Wolves	20–10	Leigh Centurions	25 February 2001	Wilderspool Stadium	Steve Ganson	8,844
Whitehaven	22–34	St. Helens	25 February 2001	Recreation Ground	Karl Kirkpatrick	4,750

== Quarter-finals ==
The quarter finals was played over the weekend of 9–11 March 2001

Home	Score	Away	Match information
Home	Score	Away	Date and time	Venue	Referee	Attendance
Hull F.C.	18–20	Leeds Rhinos	10 March 2001	The Boulevard	Russell Smith	10,123
St. Helens	54–16	Huddersfield Giants	9 March 2001	Knowsley Road	Karl Kirkpatrick	7,899
Wakefield Trinity Wildcats	0–38	Bradford Bulls	11 March 2001	Belle Vue	Stuart Cummings	5,280
Warrington Wolves	32–0	Villeneuve Leopards	11 March 2001	Wilderspool Stadium	Robert Connolly	4,805

== Semi-finals ==
The ties were played on 31 March and 1 April 2001.

31 March 2001

St. Helens	27–22	Leeds Rhinos

JJB Stadium
Attendance: 16,416
Referee: Russell Smith

1 April 2001

Warrington Wolves	22–39	Bradford Bulls

Alfred McAlpine Stadium
Attendance: 13,856
Referee: Stuart Cummings

== Final ==
The 100th Challenge Cup final was played on 28 April 2001 and was the first to be played at Twickenham Stadium. Hear'Say performed before the match. St Helen's stand off Sean Long was the winner of the Lance Todd Trophy.

28 April 2001

Bradford Bulls	6–13	St. Helens
Goal: H Paul (2); Drop goal: H Paul		Try: Martyn, Cunningham; Goal: Long (2); Drop goal: Martyn

Twickenham Stadium
Attendance: 68,250
Referee: Russell Smith

=== Teams ===
St Helens: Paul Wellens, Sean Hoppe, Kevin Iro, Paul Newlove, Anthony Sullivan; Tommy Martyn, Sean Long, David Fairleigh, Keiron Cunningham, Sonny Nickle, Chris Joynt (c), Peter Shiels, Paul Sculthorpe
Subs: Steve Hall, Anthony Stewart, Vila Matautia, Tim Jonkers Coach: Ian Millward

Bradford: Michael Withers, Tevita Vaikona, Scott Naylor, Shane Rigon, Leon Pryce, Henry Paul, Robbie Paul (c), Joe Vagana, James Lowes, Brian McDermott, Jamie Peacock, Daniel Gartner, Mike Forshaw
Subs: Paul Deacon, Paul Anderson, Lee Gilmour, Stuart Fielden Coach: Brian Noble

== UK Broadcasting rights ==
The tournament was screened in the United Kingdom by the BBC.

Round	BBC live match
Round 4	St Helens vs Wigan Leigh vs Salford
Round 5	Castleford vs Leeds Halifax Vs Bradford Bulls
Quarter-finals Hull Fc vs Leeds Wakefield vs Bradford	
Semi-finals	St. Helens v Leeds Rhinos; Warrington Wolves v Bradford Bulls
Final	Bradford Bulls v St. Helens
