= Vagana =

Vagana is a Samoan surname. Notable people with the surname include:

- Joe Vagana (born 1975), New Zealand rugby league player
- Linda Vagana (born 1971), New Zealand netball player and coach, cousin of Joe and Nigel
- Nigel Vagana (born 1975), New Zealand rugby league player, cousin of Joe and Linda
