= 2000 Challenge Cup =

Rugby league competition

2000 Silk Cut Challenge Cup
- Duration: 8 rounds
- Highest attendance: 67,247
- Broadcast partners: BBC Sport
- Winners: Bradford Bulls
- Runners-up: Leeds Rhinos
- Lance Todd Trophy: Henry Paul

The 2000 Challenge Cup (officially known as the 2000 Silk Cut Challenge Cup for sponsorship reasons) is a rugby league football tournament which began its preliminary stages in December 1999 and ended with the final on 29 April 2000.

The final was held on Saturday, 29 April 2000, at Murrayfield Stadium, Edinburgh, UK. The game was won by Bradford Bulls who defeated Leeds Rhinos 24–18.

== First round ==
The first round was scheduled for the weekend of 4/5 December 1999, but due to cold weather leading to frozen pitches, a number of games were postponed. The last tie in the round was not played until 3 January 2000.

First round
Home	Score	Away	Date
Army	54–7	Dewsbury Celtic	Saturday 4 December 1999
Askam	14–32	Eccles	Saturday 4 December 1999
Castleford Panthers	8–16	Thornhill	Saturday 4 December 1999
East Leeds	26–4	Crosfields	Saturday 4 December 1999
Heworth	2–16	Oulton	Saturday 4 December 1999
Hull Dockers	0–4	Royal Navy	Saturday 4 December 1999
Ideal Isberg	30–10	Milford	Saturday 4 December 1999
John Moores University	4–34	New Earswick	Saturday 4 December 1999
Leigh East	14–32	West Bowling	Saturday 4 December 1999
Millom	8–5	Elland	Saturday 4 December 1999
Norland	8–46	Stanley	Saturday 4 December 1999
Queens	26–17	Queensbury	Saturday 4 December 1999
Rochdale Mayfield	16–6	Eastmoor	Saturday 4 December 1999
Royal Air Force	20–8	Normanton	Saturday 4 December 1999
Shaw Cross	20–8	Townville	Saturday 4 December 1999
Wigan St Judes	36–12	London Skolars	Saturday 4 December 1999
Dublin	2–54	Farnworth	Sunday 5 December 1999
Clayton	2–18	Siddal	Saturday 11 December 1999
Dewsbury Moor	14–30	Haydock	Saturday 11 December 1999
Keighley Albion	17–10	Simms Cross	Saturday 11 December 1999
Wath Brow	22–8	Barrow Island	Saturday 11 December 1999
Blackbrook	0–11	Waterhead	Tuesday 14 December 1999
Hensingham	6–17	Featherstone Lions	Monday 3 January 2000

== Second round ==
Second round
Home	Score	Away	Date
Army	24–10	Oulton	Saturday 18 December 1999
Castleford Lock Lane	38–4	Royal Navy	Saturday 18 December 1999
Royal Air Force	6–40	Wigan St Judes	Saturday 18 December 1999
Sheffield Hillsborough	10–30	Ideal Isberg	Saturday 18 December 1999
Siddal	34–14	Leigh Miners Rangers	Saturday 18 December 1999
Skirlaugh	19–6	Haydock	Saturday 18 December 1999
Walney Central	16–2	Woolston	Saturday 18 December 1999
Waterhead	44–2 (Note: Abandoned after 70 minutes due to bad weather)	Millom	Saturday 18 December 1999
Wath Brow	22–13	West Bowling	Saturday 18 December 1999
Oldham St Annes	P-P	Farnworth	Monday 27 December 1999
Saddleworth	2–29	West Hull	Tuesday 28 December 1999
Wigan St Patricks	30–8	Eccles	Thursday 30 December 1999
Dudley Hill	32–30	Redhill	Sunday 2 January 2000
Queens	6–26	Thornhill	Sunday 2 January 2000
Shaw Cross	52–7	East Leeds	Monday 3 January 2000
Keighley Albion	1–14	Stanley	Monday 3 January 2000
New Earswick	4–44	Featherstone Lions	Saturday 8 January 2000
Cardiff	18–10	Rochdale Mayfield	Sunday 9 January 2000

== Third round ==
Third round
Home	Score	Away	Date
Wath Brow Hornets	26–0	Eccles	Saturday 29 January 2000
Barrow Border Raiders	42–12	Featherstone Lions	Sunday 30 January 2000
Batley Bulldogs	0–10	Oldham St Annes	Sunday 30 January 2000
Castleford Lock Lane	16–26	Villeneuve Leopards	Sunday 30 January 2000
Dewsbury Rams	66–0	Stanley	Sunday 30 January 2000
Doncaster Dragons	40–10	St Gaudens	Sunday 30 January 2000
Featherstone Rovers	64–6	Wigan St Patricks	Sunday 30 January 2000
Keighley Cougars	90–0	Cardiff	Sunday 30 January 2000
Hull Kingston Rovers	32–4	Ideal Isberg	Sunday 30 January 2000
Lancashire Lynx	18–6	Walney Central	Sunday 30 January 2000
Leigh Centurions	34–12	Siddal	Sunday 30 January 2000
Rochdale Hornets	66–6	Army	Sunday 30 January 2000
Sheffield Hillsborough	14–16	Thornhill	Sunday 30 January 2000
Whitehaven Warriors	42–0	Shaw Cross	Sunday 30 January 2000
Widnes Vikings	76–8	West Hull	Sunday 30 January 2000
Workington Town	12–2	Skirlaugh	Sunday 30 January 2000
York Wasps	56–10	Dudley Hill	Sunday 30 January 2000
Swinton Lions	74–1	Waterhead	Tuesday 1 February 2000
Oldham Roughyeds	44–0	Wigan St Judes	Tuesday 8 February 2000

== Fourth round ==
Fourth round
Home	Score	Away	Date
Bradford Bulls	32–4	Huddersfield-Sheffield	Saturday 12 February 2000
Barrow Raiders	18–34	Salford City Reds	Sunday 13 February 2000
Dewsbury Rams	29–16	Widnes Vikings	Sunday 13 February 2000
Doncaster Dragons	54–6	Workington Town	Sunday 13 February 2000
Featherstone Rovers	12–48	Leeds Rhinos	Sunday 13 February 2000
Halifax Blue Sox	36–8	Hull Kingston Rovers	Sunday 13 February 2000
Hull F.C.	86–0	Lancashire Lynx	Sunday 13 February 2000
Hunslet Hawks	4–46	Warrington Wolves	Sunday 13 February 2000
Leigh Centurions	28–40	Wakefield Trinity Wildcats	Sunday 13 February 2000
London Broncos	44–18	Wath Brow Hornets	Sunday 13 February 2000
Oldham St Annes	8–64 (Note: Match played at Castleford)	Castleford Tigers	Sunday 13 February 2000
Rochdale Hornets	30–14	Oldham Roughyeds	Sunday 13 February 2000
Swinton Lions	22–36	St Helens	Sunday 13 February 2000
Villeneuve Leopards	16–14 (Note: Match played at Keighley)	Keighley Cougars	Sunday 13 February 2000
Wigan Warriors	98–4	Whitehaven Warriors	Sunday 13 February 2000
York Wasps	56–2	Thornhill Trojans	Sunday 13 February 2000
Source:			Sunday 13 February 2000

== Fifth round ==
Fifth round
Home	Score	Away	Date
Leeds Rhinos	26–20	St Helens	Saturday 26 February 2000
Castleford Tigers	10–11	Halifax Blue Sox	Sunday 27 February 2000
Dewsbury Rams	35–10	Villeneuve Leopards	Sunday 27 February 2000
Hull F.C.	82–10	Rochdale Hornets	Sunday 27 February 2000
London Broncos	21–22	Salford City Reds	Sunday 27 February 2000
Wakefield Trinity Wildcats	0–46	Bradford Bulls	Sunday 27 February 2000
Warrington Wolves	84–1	York Wasps	Sunday 27 February 2000
Wigan Warriors	38–2	Doncaster Dragons	Sunday 27 February 2000

== Quarter-finals ==
Fifth round
Home	Score	Away	Date
Hull F.C.	14–4	Wigan Warriors	Friday 10 March 2000
Salford City Reds	20–22	Warrington Wolves	Saturday 11 March 2020
Halifax Blue Sox	18–28	Bradford Bulls	Sunday 12 March 2000
Leeds Rhinos	42–10	Dewsbury Rams	Sunday 12 March 2000

== Semi-finals ==
Semi-finals
Home	Score	Away	Date
Bradford Bulls	44–20	Warrington Wolves	Saturday 25 March 2000
Hull F.C.	22–28	Leeds Rhinos	Sunday 26 March 2000

== Final ==
29 April 2000
15:00 BST (UTC+01:00)

Bradford Bulls	24–18	Leeds Rhinos
Tries: Michael Withers (2), Nathan McAvoy, Stuart Fielden; Goals: Henry Paul (4)		Tries: Andy Hay, Marcus St Hilaire; Goals: Iestyn Harris (5)

Murrayfield Stadium, Edinburgh
Attendance: 67,247
Referee: Steve Presley (Castleford)
Lance Todd Trophy: Henry Paul (Bradford)

Team details
Bradford Bulls		Position	Leeds Rhinos
Name	Number	Position	Number	Name
Stuart Spruce	1	FB	1	Iestyn Harris
Nathan McAvoy	2	WG	2	Leroy Rivett
Scott Naylor	3	CE	3	Richie Blackmore
Michael Withers	4	CE	4	Keith Senior
Tevita Vaikona	5	WG	5	Francis Cummins
Henry Paul	6	SO	6	Daryl Powell
Robbie Paul	7	SH	7	Ryan Sheridan
Brian McDermott	8	PR	8	Darren Fleary
James Lowes	9	HK	9	Dean Lawford
Paul Anderson	10	PF	10	Barrie McDermott
Jamie Peacock	11	SR	11	Adrian Morley
Mike Forshaw	12	SR	12	Anthony Farrell
Brad Mackay	13	LF	13	Andy Hay
Leon Pryce	14	IN	14	Marcus St Hilaire
David Boyle	15	IN	15	Lee Jackson
Bernard Dwyer	16	IN	16	David Barnhill
Stuart Fielden	17	IN	17	Jamie Mathiou
Matthew Elliott		Coach		Dean Lance
