= Jamie Fielden =

English rugby league footballer

Personal information
- Full name: James Fielden
- Born: 9 May 1978 (age 48) Halifax, West Yorkshire, England

Playing information
- Position: Prop
Club
Years	Team	Pld	T	G	FG	P
1998–00	Huddersfield	12	0	0	0	0
2001–02	Doncaster Dragons	32	4	0	0	16
2003	London Broncos	2	0	0	0	0
2003–04	Doncaster Dragons	10	1	0	0	4
2004	Keighley Cougars	8	1	0	0	4
2006	Hunslet Hawks	5	1	0	0	4
	Total	69	7	0	0	28
- As of 18/03/23
- Relatives: Stuart Fielden (brother)

James Fielden (born 9 May 1978 in Halifax, West Yorkshire) is an English former professional rugby league footballer for Keighley Cougars in National League One.

James Fielden's position of choice is as a prop.

He played for London Broncos and Huddersfield Giants in the Super League and also for Doncaster Dragons and Rochdale Hornets.

He is the older brother of Wigan Warriors and Great Britain international Stuart Fielden.
