= Scott Naylor =

English RL coach and former England international rugby league footballer

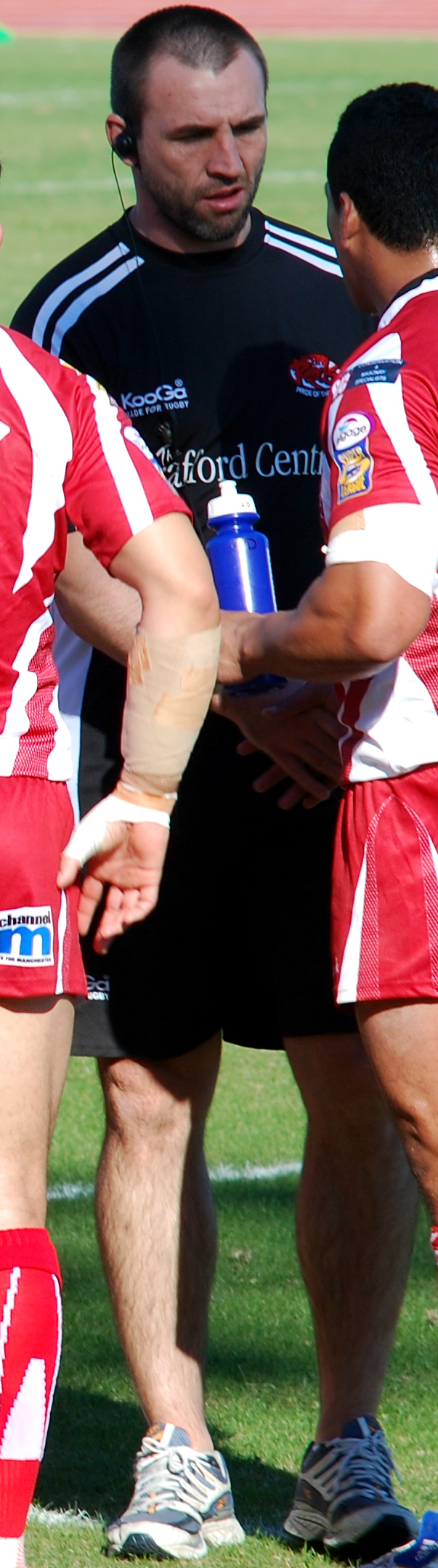

Personal information
- Born: 2 February 1972 (age 54) unknown

Playing information
- Height: 6 ft 1 in (1.85 m)
- Weight: 16 st 0 lb (102 kg)
- Position: Wing, Centre, Second-row
Club
Years	Team	Pld	T	G	FG	P
1991–92	Wigan	2	0	0	0	0
1993–97	Salford Reds	110	41	0	0	164
1998–03	Bradford Bulls	149	62	0	0	248
2004	Salford City Reds	8	0	0	0	0
	Total	269	103	0	0	412
Representative
Years	Team	Pld	T	G	FG	P
2000	England	4	1	0	0	4

Coaching information
Club
Years	Team	Gms	W	D	L	W%
2012–19	Oldham

Scott Naylor (2 February 1972) is an English former professional rugby league footballer who played in the 1990s and 2000s, and has coached in the 2010s and 2020s. He played at representative level for England, and at club level for Wigan, the Salford Reds/Salford City Reds (two spells) and the Bradford Bulls, as a wing, centre or second-row, and has coached at club level for the Salford Red Devils and in League 1 and the Championship for Oldham.

== Playing career ==
=== World Club Challenge appearances ===
Naylor played at centre in the Bradford Bulls', champions of Super League VI, 41–26 victory over the Newcastle Knights, premiers of the 2001 NRL, in the 2002 World Club Challenge at Alfred McAlpine Stadium in Huddersfield, England, on Friday 1 February 2002, before a crowd of 21,113.

=== Super League Grand final appearances ===
Naylor played at centre in the Bradford Bulls' 6-8 defeat by St. Helens in the 1999 Super League Grand Final during 1999's Super League IV at Old Trafford, Manchester on Saturday 9 October 1999, in front of a crowd of 50,717, he played at centre in the 37-6 victory over the Wigan Warriors in the 2001 Super League Grand Final during 2001's Super League VI at Old Trafford, Manchester on Saturday 13 October 2001, in front of a crowd of 60,164, and he played at centre and scored a try in the 18-19 defeat by St. Helens in the 2002 Super League Grand Final during 2002's Super League VII at Old Trafford, Manchester on Saturday 19 October 2002, in front of a crowd of 61,138.

=== Challenge Cup final appearances ===
Naylor played at centre in the Bradford Bulls' 24-18 victory over the Leeds Rhinos in the 2000 Challenge Cup Final during 2000's Super League V at Murrayfield Stadium, Edinburgh, Scotland on Saturday 9 October 1999, in front of a crowd of 67,247, he played at centre in the 6-13 defeat by St. Helens in the 2001 Challenge Cup Final during 2001's Super League VI at Murrayfield Stadium, Edinburgh, Scotland on Saturday 13 October 2001, in front of a crowd of 68,250, and he played at centre in the 22-20 victory over the Leeds Rhinos in the 2003 Challenge Cup Final during 2003's Super League VIII at Millennium Stadium, Cardiff, Wales on Saturday 19 October 2002, in front of a crowd of 71,212.

=== Club career ===
Naylor made his début for the Wigan Warriors in the 34-14 victory over the Dewsbury Rams in the 1991–92 Regal Trophy preliminary round at Central Park, Wigan on Tuesday 29 October 1991, he scored no tries for the Wigan Warriors, and he played his last match for the Wigan Warriors in the 18-0 victory over Hull Kingston Rovers in the 1991–92 Regal Trophy second round at Craven Park, Kingston upon Hull on Sunday 6 December 1992.

=== International honours ===
Naylor won caps for England while at the Bradford Bulls in the 2000 Rugby League World Cup against Australia, Fiji (1-try), Ireland (interchange/substitute) and New Zealand.

== Honoured at Bradford Bulls ==
Naylor was included in Bradford Bulls' 'Bull Masters'.
