= Hudson Smith =

Australian rugby league footballer

Personal information
- Full name: Hudson Smith
- Born: 17 December 1972 (age 53) Sydney, New South Wales, Australia

Playing information
- Position: Lock, Second-row
Club
Years	Team	Pld	T	G	FG	P
1994–98	Balmain Tigers	78	5	1	0	22
1999	Salford City Reds	27	5	0	0	20
2000	Bradford Bulls	34	4	0	0	16
	Total	139	14	1	0	58
- Source: As of 17 May 2019

Hudson Smith is an Australian former rugby league footballer who played in the 1990s and 2000s. He played for Balmain, Salford City Reds and Bradford Bulls.

== Playing career ==
Smith made his first grade debut for Balmain in Round 1 1994 against North Sydney at Leichhardt Oval. Smith made seven appearances for Balmain in his first season as the club finished last on the table claiming the wooden spoon. This was only the fourth time that Balmain had finished last on the table since entering the competition in 1908.

In 1995 at the start of the Super League war, Balmain decided to change their name to the "Sydney Tigers" and move their home games to Parramatta Stadium in a bid to appeal to a wider fan base. The change in name or venue didn't help the club's fortunes and they missed the finals in both their years at Parramatta. Smith would be a regular starter in the team over both seasons.

In 1997, Balmain reverted to their former name and moved their home games back to Leichhardt Oval after the "Sydney Tigers" idea was deemed a failure. The club would go on to miss the finals by just 1 point in 1997. In Smith's final year at Balmain, the club finished a disappointing 13th place.

In 1999, Smith joined Salford. That year, Salford managed to avoid relegation finishing 12th. In 2000, Smith joined Bradford and played in their semi-final loss against Wigan.

Smith then returned to Australia and signed with Burleigh Heads in the Queensland competition. He later became captain-coach of Cobar who played in the Group 11 NSW competition.
