= 2002 Super League season =

Season in rugby league

Super League VII
- League: Super League
- Duration: 28 Rounds
- Teams: 12
- Highest attendance: 18,789; Wigan Warriors vs St. Helens (8 Sept)
- Lowest attendance: 2,211; Salford City Reds vs London Broncos (19 May)
- Broadcast partners: Sky Sports

2002 Season
- Champions: St. Helens; 4th Super League title 11th British title
- League Leaders: St. Helens
- Man of Steel: (England) Paul Sculthorpe
- Top point-scorer: (England) Paul Deacon (301)
- Top try-scorer: (Australia) Dennis Moran (22)

Promotion and relegation
- Promoted from National League One: Huddersfield Giants
- Relegated to National League One: Salford City Reds

Super League VII (styled Tetley's Super League VII due to sponsorship from Tetley's Brewery) was the year 2002's Super League championship season, the 108th season of top-level professional rugby league in Britain, and the seventh run by the Super League. Twelve clubs from across England competed during the season, culminating in the 2002 Super League Grand Final between St. Helens and Bradford Bulls, which St Helens won, claiming their third premiership in four seasons.

Lee Briers of Warrington Wolves scored a record-equalling 5 drop goals against Halifax Blue Sox in the Super League match on 25 May 2002.

== Operational rules ==
Salary cap limits were adjusted in an attempt to make Super League more competitive:

- The cap for money spent on players' salaries was set at £1.8 million per club from the 2002 season. The previous limit had allowed the clubs to spend either £0.75 million per year or a higher amount as long as it was no more than 50% of the clubs "salary cap relevant income".
- The cap change allowed some clubs in Super League to spend more money on players than they had previously but forced a reduction in spending at others. Wigan Warriors were given 12 months' dispensation to spend up to £2.3 million due to existing contract commitments.

== Table ==
Pos	Team	Pld	W	D	L	PF	PA	PD	Pts	Qualification
1	St Helens (L, C)	28	23	0	5	927	522	+405	46	Semi-final
2	Bradford Bulls	28	23	0	5	910	519	+391	46	Semi-final
3	Wigan Warriors	28	19	1	8	817	475	+342	39	Elimination play-offs
4	Leeds Rhinos	28	17	0	11	865	700	+165	34	Elimination play-offs
5	Hull F.C.	28	16	0	12	742	674	+68	32	Elimination play-offs
6	Castleford Tigers	28	14	2	12	736	615	+121	30	Elimination play-offs
7	Widnes Vikings	28	14	1	13	590	716	−126	29	
8	London Broncos	28	13	1	14	661	635	+26	27	
9	Halifax Blue Sox	28	8	0	20	558	856	−298	16	
10	Warrington Wolves	28	7	0	21	483	878	−395	14	
11	Wakefield Trinity Wildcats	28	5	2	21	566	899	−333	12	
12	Salford City Reds (R)	28	5	1	22	490	856	−366	11	Relegation to National League One

Source: Rugby League Project
Rules for classification: 1) Points; 2) Points difference; 3) Number of points scored;
(C) Champions; (L) League Leaders' Shield Winners; (R) Relegated
