= Linda Vagana =

NZ international netball player & coach

Linda Vagana MNZM
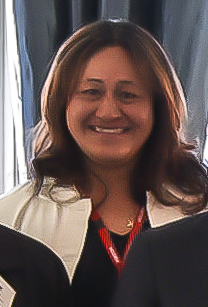
- Vagana in 2019

Personal information
- Born: 23 July 1971 (age 55) Auckland, New Zealand
- Relatives: Nigel Vagana (cousin); Joe Vagana (cousin)

Netball career
- Playing positions: GK, GD
Years	National team	Caps
1993–2002	New Zealand	61
Coaching career
- Years: Team
- 2004–present: Samoa
Medal record
Representing New Zealand
Commonwealth Games
Silver medal – second place	1998 Kuala Lumpur	Netball
- Updated on 22 October 2010

Linda Tuumuliga Vagana MNZM (born 23 July 1971 in Auckland, New Zealand) is an international netball coach and former representative player from New Zealand. Vagana played as a circle defender, and was a member of the New Zealand national netball team, the Silver Ferns, from 1993 (joining the squad at the end of 1992) and from 1996 up until 2002, earning 61 caps, and played for Samoa at the 2003 World Championships. She was appointed a Member of the New Zealand Order of Merit in the 2003 Queen's Birthday Honours, for services to netball. Domestically, she played for the Northern Force in the National Bank Cup from 1998 to 2005.

Vagana currently coaches the Samoa national netball team, and is the General Manager of Duffy Books in Homes. She is the cousin of rugby league players Nigel Vagana and Joe Vagana.
