= Graham Mackay =

Australia & Scotland international rugby league footballer

Personal information
- Born: 12 October 1968 (age 57) Australia

Playing information
- Height: 190 cm (6 ft 3 in)
- Weight: 100 kg (15 st 10 lb)
- Position: Wing, Centre
Club
Years	Team	Pld	T	G	FG	P
1988–90	Western Suburbs Magpies	47	16	19	0	102
1991–94	Penrith Panthers	82	43	41	0	255
1995	Sydney City	13	7	20	0	68
1996	South Queensland Crushers	8	2	9	0	26
1997–98	Gold Coast Chargers	43	15	42	0	144
1999	Manly Sea Eagles	8	1	2	0	8
2000	Leeds Rhinos	20	10	2	0	44
2001	Bradford Bulls	19	12	1	0	50
2002	Hull FC	29	19	24	1	125
	Total	269	125	160	1	822
Representative
Years	Team	Pld	T	G	FG	P
1992–94	New South Wales	4	0	1	0	2
1992	Australia	1	1	2	0	8
2000	Scotland	1	0	1	0	2

Graham Mackay (born 12 October 1968) is a former international and state representative rugby league footballer whose club career spanned ten Australian and English clubs, including Western Suburbs, Penrith Panthers, South Queensland Crushers, Gold Coast Chargers, Hull FC, Leeds Rhinos and the Ipswich Jets in a sixteen-year top grade career. His position of choice was on the wing, though he played centre later in his career.

Mackay competed in and won the Gladiator Individual Sports Athletes Challenge in 1995.

== Playing career ==
=== 1980s ===
Mackay was a schoolboy rugby union representative with the Sydney Combined High Schools side. He was graded by Western Suburbs in 1987 and made his first grade début in round 1 of the 1988 season. He was a regular first-grader in 1989 and a capable goal-kicker booting 19 conversions and scoring six tries in his second top-grade season.

=== 1990s ===
Indifferent form saw Mackay make only eleven appearances in Wests' run-on side in 1990 and at the end of that season he was swapped by Wests in the short-lived and controversial draft system which existed in Australian rugby league solely in the 1991 season. A strong runner and defender Mackay added the strength of an extra forward to the backline. He was a member of the Panthers successful 1991 premiership side. Following the grand final victory he travelled with the Panthers to England for the 1991 World Club Challenge which was lost to Wigan. Mackay was 31st draft choice when snapped up by Penrith coach Phil Gould. Under Gould as State coach, Mackay made his representative début for New South Wales on the wing in game I of the 1992 State of Origin series. He also played in game II of 1992. In 1992 he made his Australian national début in a Test match against Papua New Guinea in Townsville. Mackay scored two tries in a man-of-the-match performance on début. He was chosen in Australia's World Cup squad at year's end, he did not play in the final.

Mackay regularly competed for a New South Wales wing spot against Andrew Ettingshausen, gaining selection in State of Origin game III of 1993 and game I of 1994 (NSW selectors though always had the luxury of playing ET at either fullback, wing or centre).

Despite his goal-kicking ability and strong bursts down the flank, his representative form was inconsistent and he was dropped after the Blues' game I loss of 1994.

Mackay quit the Panthers at the end of 1994 to link with his former coach Gould at Easts. He spent the 1995 season there and returned to good goal-kicking form booting 20 goals in just 13 games.

In 1996 he joined the South Queensland Crushers for that club's second season in the ARL. Following a pay dispute with the cash-strapped Crushers, he joined the neighbouring Gold Coast Chargers, and captained the Chargers during the final two years of the club's existence. Following the demise of the Gold Coast, Mackay signed with his sixth club, the Manly-Warringah Sea Eagles for the 1999 NRL season.

=== 2000s ===
In 2000 he transferred to Super League club, Leeds. In the 2000 Rugby League World Cup tournament Mackay represented Scotland.

Graham represented his heritage in representing Scotland at the 2000 Rugby league World Cup.

Mackay switched to Bradford Bulls in 2001. He played for them at centre, scoring a try, and kicking a goal in their 2001 Super League Grand Final victory against Wigan.

The swansong of his long and varied first grade career was in 2002 with Hull F.C. In 2003 he joined the Ipswich Jets under coach Trevor Gillmeister. Mackay started coaching the Ormeau Shearers on the Gold Coast in 2012.
