= 2001 Super League Grand Final =

Bradford Bulls	Wigan Warriors
37	6
	1	2	Total
BRA	26	11	37
WIG	0	6	6
- Date: 13 October 2001
- Stadium: Old Trafford
- Location: (England) Manchester
- Harry Sunderland Trophy: (Ireland) Michael Withers, ( Bradford Bulls)
- Referee: Stuart Cummings
- Attendance: 60,164

Broadcast partners
- Broadcasters: Sky Sports
- Commentators: Eddie Hemmings; Mike Stephenson

The 2001 Super League Grand Final was the fourth official grand final and the conclusive and championship-deciding match of Super League VI. The match was held on Saturday 13 October 2001 at Old Trafford, Manchester, and was contested by Bradford Bulls and Wigan Warriors. Refereed by Stuart Cummings, 60,164 saw Bradford Bulls win 37 - 6.

== Background ==
Tetleys Super League VI was the fourth and final time the top five playoff system would be used and the first season relegation was reintroduced with Huddersfield Giants again finishing bottom and relegated. Bradford Bulls finished top for a third time.

	Team	Pld	W	D	L	PF	PA	PD	Pts
1	Bradford Bulls	28	22	1	5	1120	474	+646	45
2	Wigan Warriors	28	22	1	5	989	494	+495	45

=== Route to the Final ===
==== Bradford Bulls ====
Bradford finished first in the table so they automatically qualified for the play-off semi-finals where they had a home time against Wigan at Odsal Stadium. Bradford won 24–18 to qualify for the Grand Final.

==== Wigan Warriors ====
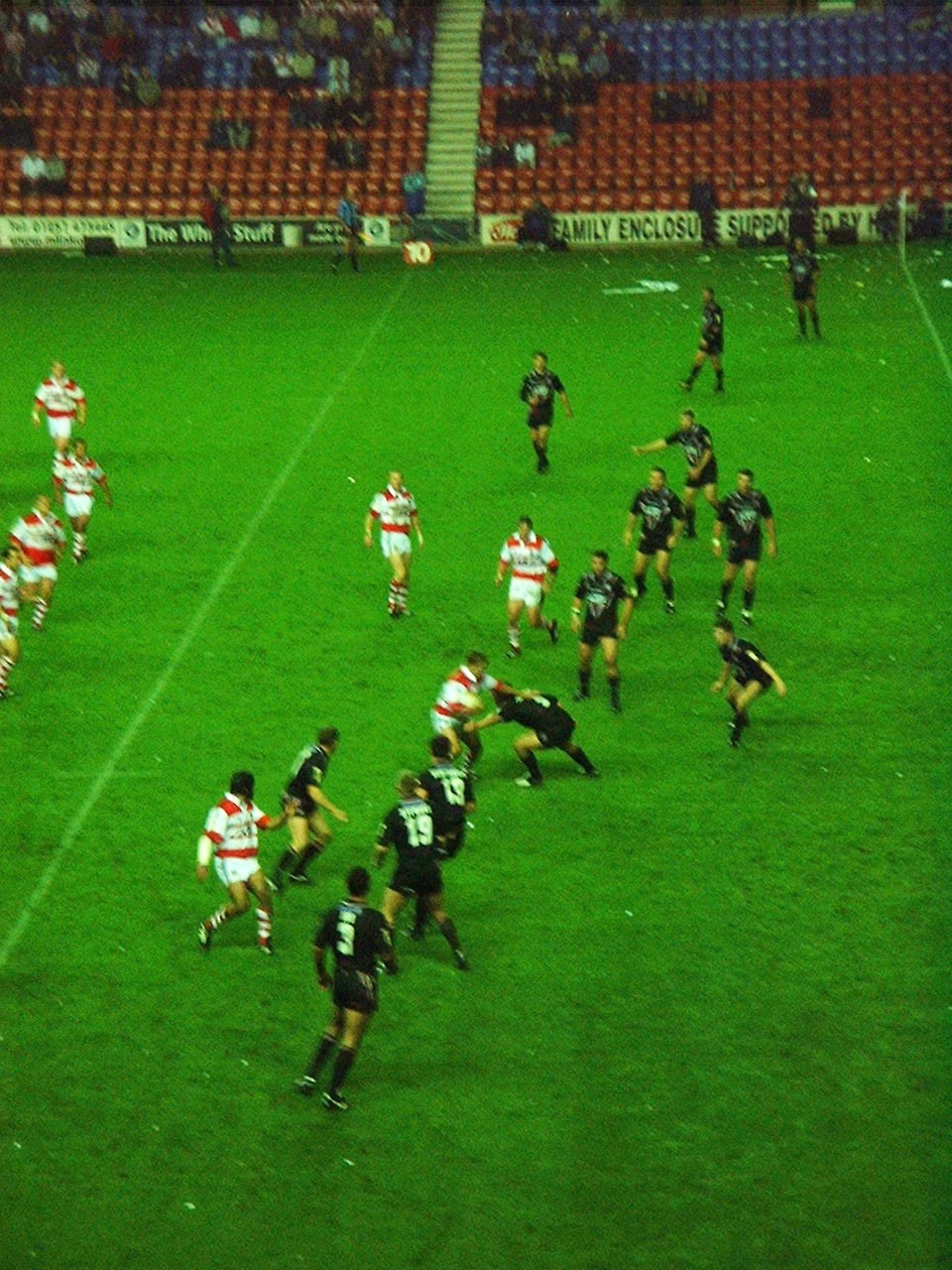
Wigan vs St Helens in the preliminary final

The play-off system in use only gave the league leaders a bye to the semi-finals. Wigan had finished second so had to play a qualifying play-off first. Drawn at home to Hull F.C. Wigan won a close game 27–24 to go through to the semi-final. This was an away fixture to Bradford where they were beaten 24–18. However this loss did not end their season. The losers of the qualifying semi-final got another chance by playing the winners of the other semi-final in a final eliminator. Therefore, Wigan's third play-off game was a home tie against St Helens where they won through 44–10.

Wigan
Round	Opposition	Score
Qualifying Semi-Final	Hull FC (H)	27-24
Semi-Final	Bradford Bulls (A)	24-18
Preliminary Final	St Helens (H)	44-10
Key: (H) = Home venue; (A) = Away venue.

== Match details ==
13 October 2001

Bradford Bulls	37 - 6	Wigan Warriors
Tries: James Lowes, Michael Withers (3), Stuart Fielden, Graham Mackay; Goals: Henry Paul (5), Graham Mackay; Drop Goals: Henry Paul	Report	Tries: Adrian Lam; Goals: David Furner

Old Trafford, Manchester
Attendance: 60,164
Referee: Stuart Cummings

Bradford Bulls		Position	Wigan Warriors	
1	(Ireland) Michael Withers	Fullback	1	(England) Kris Radlinski
	(Tonga) Tevita Vaikona	Winger	2	(Australia) Brett Dallas
	(England) Scott Naylor	Centre	3	(England) Gary Connolly
	(Australia) Graham Mackay	Centre		(New Zealand) Steve Renouf
5	(England) Leon Pryce	Winger	5	(Ireland) Brian Carney
6	(New Zealand) Henry Paul	Stand Off		(Australia) Matthew Johns
7	(New Zealand) Robbie Paul	Scrum half	7	(Papua New Guinea) Adrian Lam
	(New Zealand) Joe Vagana	Prop		(Ireland) Terry O'Connor
9	(England) James Lowes	Hooker	9	(England) Terry Newton
	(England) Brian McDermott	Prop		(England) Harvey Howard
	(Australia) Daniel Gartner	2nd Row		(England) Mick Cassidy
11	(England) Jamie Peacock	2nd Row		(Australia) David Furner
	(England) Mike Forshaw	Loose forward	13	(England) Andy Farrell
	(England) Paul Deacon	Interchange		(England) Paul Johnson
	(Australia) Shane Rigon	Interchange		(England) Chris Chester
	(England) Paul Anderson	Interchange		(England) Denis Betts
	(England) Stuart Fielden	Interchange		(England) Neil Cowie
	(England) Brian Noble	Coach		(Australia) Stuart Raper
