= Justin Brooker =

Australian rugby league footballer

Personal information
- Full name: Justin Brooker
- Born: 8 August 1977 (age 48) Liverpool, New South Wales, Australia

Playing information
- Height: 177 cm (5 ft 10 in)
- Weight: 94 kg (14 st 11 lb; 207 lb)
- Position: Wing, Centre, Fullback
Club
Years	Team	Pld	T	G	FG	P
1998	Eastern Suburbs	3	2	0	0	8
1999	Western Suburbs	22	9	0	0	36
2000	Bradford Bulls	21	11	0	0	44
2001	Wakefield Trinity Wildcats	25	9	0	0	36
2002	South Sydney	7	1	0	0	4
	Total	78	32	0	0	128

Justin 'Brash' Brooker (born 8 August 1977) is an Indigenous Australian professional rugby league footballer who played in the 1990s and 2000s. He played at club level for Eastern Suburbs, Western Suburbs Magpies, the Bradford Bulls, the Wakefield Trinity Wildcats and the South Sydney Rabbitohs, as a centre.

== Playing career ==
Brooker played in the Campbelltown League with the Minto Cobras, then a move to the country in the Group 6 League where he won titles in U'16 and First grade. Brooker had recently turned 21 when he made his début with the Sydney City Roosters, scoring two tries on debut. He was again named at fullback for the next two weeks.

In 1999, Brooker joined the Western Suburbs Magpies. He played mostly at centre. Despite a poor season from the Western Suburbs club, he scored nine tries, including two doubles and was named Supporters player of the year. He was the last player to score for Western Suburbs before they merged with Balmain Tigers in 2000.

Brooker left Australia and played in the Super League for the Bradford Bulls and Wakefield Trinity Wildcats before returning to Australia to play for the South Sydney Rabbitohs. In September 2002 it was announced that Brooker retired from football to pursue another career.

== Sources ==
- Alan Whiticker & Glen Hudson (2007). The Encyclopedia of Rugby League Players. Wetherill Park, New South Wales: Gary Allen Pty Ltd. ISBN 978-1-877082-93-1.
