= Shane Rigon =

Australian rugby league footballer

Personal information
- Full name: Shane Rigon
- Born: 6 January 1977 (age 49) Sydney, New South Wales, Australia

Playing information
- Height: 180 cm (5 ft 11 in)
- Weight: 94 kg (14 st 11 lb)
- Position: Lock, Centre, Hooker
Club
Years	Team	Pld	T	G	FG	P
1996–00	Sydney Roosters	84	18	0	0	72
2001	Bradford Bulls	30	12	0	0	48
2002–07	South Sydney	99	12	0	0	48
	Total	213	42	0	0	168
Representative
Years	Team	Pld	T	G	FG	P
1997	NSW City	1	0	0	0	0

Shane Rigon (born 6 January 1977) is an Australian former professional rugby league footballer who played in the 1990s and 2000s.

== Background ==
Rigon was educated at Christian Brothers' High School, Lewisham. He played junior rugby for Lewisham Christian Brothers and St George Dragons.

== Playing career ==
Rigon made his début in the top grade in 1996 for the Roosters against Parramatta. He played for the Roosters from the interchange bench in their 2000 NRL Grand Final loss to the Brisbane Broncos.

In November 2000, Rigon signed for Bradford Bulls in the Super League. Rigon played for Bradford from the interchange bench in their 2001 Super League Grand Final victory against the Wigan Warriors.

Rigon later returned to Australia to continue playing in the NRL for the South Sydney Rabbitohs during a difficult time in the club's history, as they finished last on the table 3 times in 5 years. Rigon's last game in first grade was a 30–6 loss against Manly-Warringah in the 2007 qualifying final.
