= Lee Gilmour =

GB & Scotland international rugby league footballer

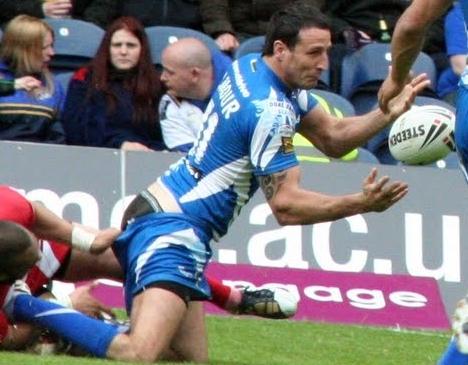

Personal information
- Full name: Lee Andrew Gilmour
- Born: 12 March 1978 (age 48) Dewsbury, West Yorkshire, England

Playing information
- Height: 189 cm (6 ft 2 in)
- Weight: 97 kg (15 st 4 lb)
- Position: Second-row, Centre, Loose forward
Club
Years	Team	Pld	T	G	FG	P
1997–01	Wigan Warriors	93	24	0	0	96
2001–03	Bradford Bulls	86	22	0	0	88
2003–09	St Helens	178	52	0	0	208
2010–12	Huddersfield Giants	81	19	0	0	76
2013–14	Castleford Tigers	13	0	0	0	0
2014(Loan)	→ Wakefield Trinity Wildcats	13	2	0	0	8
	Total	464	119	0	0	476
Representative
Years	Team	Pld	T	G	FG	P
1998	Emerging England	1	0	0	0	0
2000	Scotland	3	0	0	0	0
1999–06	Great Britain	15	1	0	0	4
2001–03	Yorkshire	3	1	0	0	4

Lee Andrew Gilmour (born 12 March 1978) is an English assistant coach at Wakefield Trinity in the Super League and a former professional rugby league footballer. He played in the Super League for the Wigan Warriors (with whom he won 1998's Super League III), the Bradford Bulls, St Helens (with whom he won 2006's Super League XI), the Huddersfield Giants, Wakefield Trinity Wildcats and the Castleford Tigers. Gilmour represented Great Britain and Scotland at international level.

== Background ==
Gilmour was born in Dewsbury, West Yorkshire, England.

== Playing career ==
Gilmour started his career with Shaw Cross Sharks, had a spell at Thornhill Trojans, and played for Dewsbury Moor before signing for Wigan Warriors. He toured New Zealand with Great Britain Academy in 1997. Gilmour played at second-row for Wigan in their 1998 Super League Grand Final victory over Leeds Rhinos. Gilmour played for the Wigan Warriors from the interchange bench in their 2000 Super League Grand Final loss against St. Helens.

Gilmour went on to play for Bradford Bulls, the Great Britain, Emerging England, and Scotland. As Super League VI champions, the Bradford Bulls played against 2001 NRL Premiers, the Newcastle Knights in the 2002 World Club Challenge. Gilmour played at centre in Bradford's victory. Gilmour played for Bradford Bulls from the bench in their 2002 Super League Grand Final loss against St. Helens. Gilmour played for St Helens from the interchange bench in their 2006 Challenge Cup Final victory against the Huddersfield Giants. St Helens reached the 2006 Super League Grand final to be contested against Hull FC, and Gilmour played as a second-row in Saints' 26-4 victory. Gilmour gained true international repute when during the 2006 Rugby League Tri-Nations he scored the decisive try in the Lions' 23-12 win in Aussie Stadium in 2006. As 2006 Super League champions, St Helens faced 2006 NRL Premiers the Brisbane Broncos in the 2007 World Club Challenge. Gilmour played as a second-row in Saints' 18-14 victory. He played in 2008's Super League XIII Grand Final defeat by the Leeds Rhinos.

In July 2009 it was announced that Gilmour had signed a two-year contract with Super League rivals, Huddersfield Giants.

He played in the 2009 Super League Grand Final defeat by the Leeds Rhinos at Old Trafford.

On 23 June 2011 Gilmour signed a new two-year deal with Huddersfield Giants despite talks of his retirement.

In June 2012 Gilmour negotiated an early release from his Huddersfield Giants contract and went on to sign a two-year deal with the Castleford Tigers.

In May 2014, Gilmour joined Wakefield Trinity Wildcats on loan. In September 2014, he was appointed as a coach at Wakefield.

On 22 July 2016, Gilmour signed for his home town amateur club Shaw Cross Sharks where he started his career to play in the prestigious amateur RL competition in National Conference Division 1 until the end of the 2016 season.
