= Joe Vagana =

New Zealand and Samoa international rugby league footballer

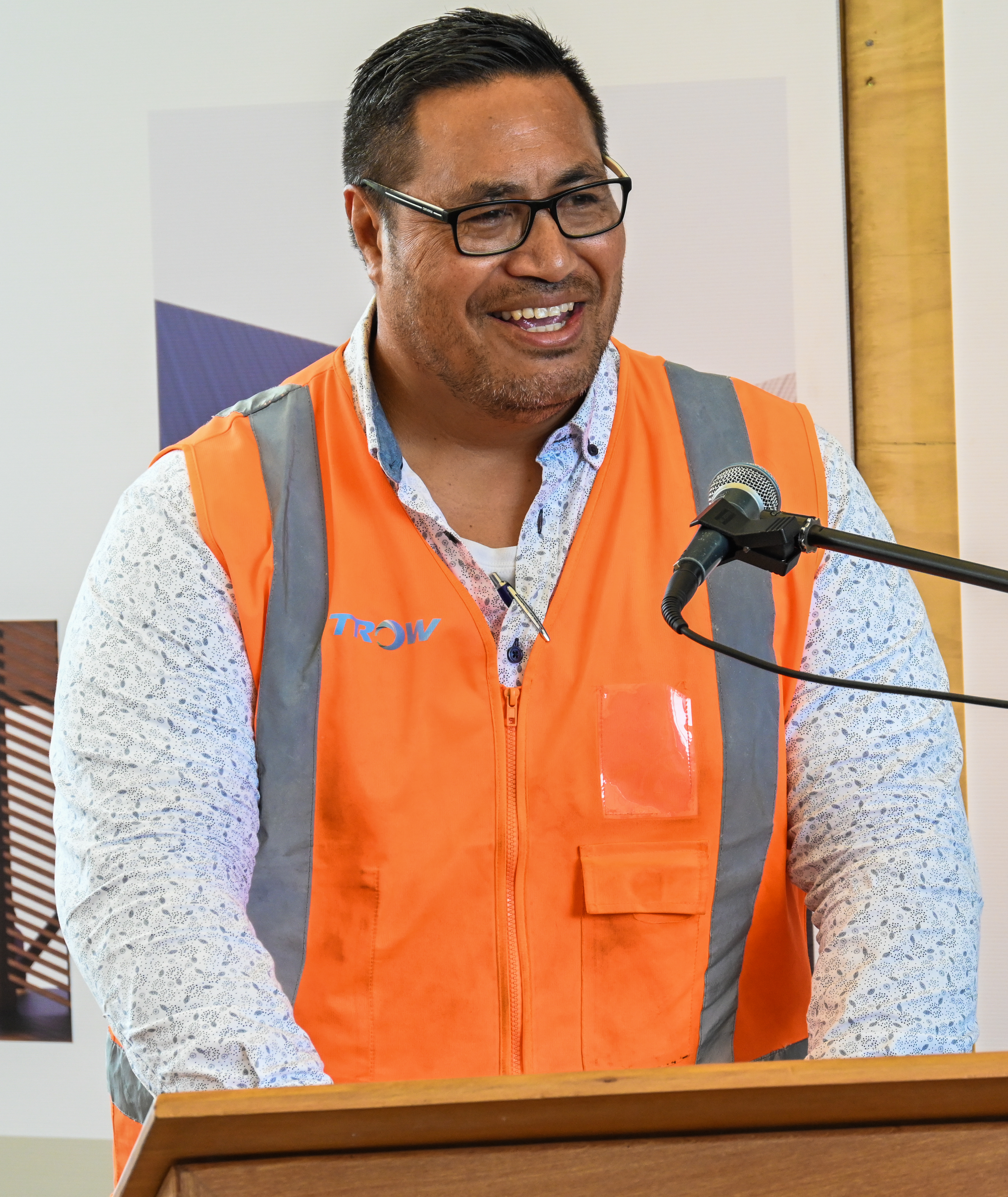

Personal information
- Full name: Joseph Sonny Vagana
- Born: 21 January 1975 (age 50) Auckland, New Zealand

Playing information
- Height: 190 cm (6 ft 3 in)
- Weight: 130 kg (20 st 7 lb)
- Position: Prop
Club
| Years | Team | Pld | T | G | FG | P |
|---|---|---|---|---|---|---|
| 1992–?? | Richmond |
| 1994 | North Harbour | 16 | 1 | 0 | 0 | 0 |
| 1995–00 | Auckland Warriors | 115 | 9 | 0 | 0 | 36 |
| 2001–08 | Bradford Bulls | 220 | 17 | 0 | 0 | 68 |
| | Total | 351 | 27 | 0 | 0 | 104 |
Representative
| Years | Team | Pld | T | G | FG | P |
| 1993 | Auckland | 9 | 1 | 0 | 0 | 4 |
| 1995 | Samoa | 2 | 0 | 0 | 0 | 0 |
| 1996–06 | New Zealand | 27 | 0 | 0 | 0 | 0 |
- Education: St Paul's College, Auckland
- Relatives: Isaiah Vagana (son); Nigel Vagana (cousin); Linda Vagana (cousin)

Joseph Sonny Vagana (born 21 January 1975), also known by the nickname of "Big Joe", is a former professional rugby league footballer who played as a Prop forward in the 1990s and 2000s. During his career Vagana played for the Auckland Warriors, and the Bradford Bulls, and also represented both Samoa and New Zealand in international competition.

== Background ==
Joe was born in Auckland, New Zealand. He is the cousin of fellow rugby league international Nigel Vagana, and the New Zealand netballer Linda Vagana.

== Playing career ==
=== Auckland Rugby League ===
Whilst a student at St Pauls College, Vagana played rugby league for the Richmond Rovers club in the Auckland Rugby League competition. In 1993 he played 9 games for Auckland. He then played for the successful North Harbour Sea Eagles in the 1994 Lion Red Cup. Vagana played for the Junior Kiwis for three seasons, between 1992 and 1994.

=== National Rugby League ===
In 1995 Vagana was signed by the Auckland Warriors as they prepared for their début season in the Australian Rugby League. He made his début for the club on 18 March 1995 in the Warriors second ever premiership match. In 1995 Joe represented Western Samoa in the 1995 Rugby League World Cup. Vagana was selected for the New Zealand team to compete in the end of season 1999 Rugby League Tri-Nations tournament. In the final against Australia he played at prop forward in the Kiwis' 22–20 loss. He went on to play 116 games for the Warriors, leaving the club when Eric Watson bought the franchise, but not the player contracts, in 2000. Vagana also played 25 times for the New Zealand national rugby league team, including playing in the 2000 Rugby League World Cup.

=== Super League ===
Despite competition from other Super League and Australian clubs, Vagana signed for the Bradford Bulls in 2001. He became one part of the Bradford Bulls' Awesome Foursome, a phrase coined by the media, alongside Stuart Fielden, Brian McDermott and Paul Anderson. Vagana played for the Bradford Bulls at prop forward in their 2001 Super League Grand Final victory against the Wigan Warriors. As Super League VI champions, the Bradford Bulls played against 2001 NRL Premiers, the Newcastle Knights in the 2002 World Club Challenge. Vagana played as a prop forward in Bradford's victory. He also played for Bradford at prop forward in their 2002 Super League Grand Final loss against St. Helens. Vagana played for the Bradford Bulls at prop forward in their 2003 Super League Grand Final victory against the Wigan Warriors. Having won Super League VIII, Bradford played against 2003 NRL Premiers, the Penrith Panthers in the 2004 World Club Challenge. Vagana played from the interchange bench in the Bradford Bulls' 22–4 victory. He also played for Bradford at prop forward in their 2004 Super League Grand Final loss against the Leeds Rhinos. Vagana played for the Bradford Bulls from the interchange bench in their 2005 Super League Grand Final victory against the Leeds Rhinos.

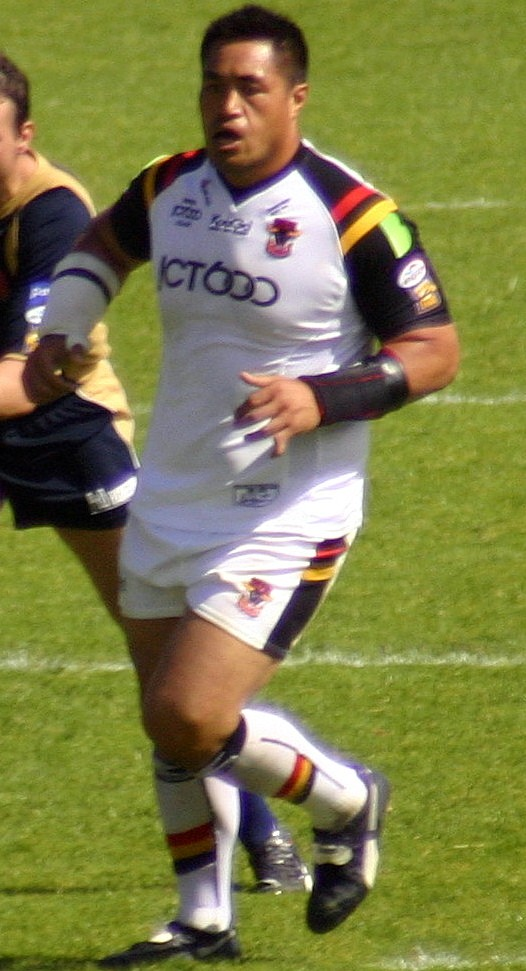
Vagana playing for Bradford in 2008

As Super League champions Bradford faced National Rugby League premiers Wests Tigers in the 2006 World Club Challenge. Vagana played from the interchange bench in the Bradford Bulls' 30–10 victory. A destructive tackler and strong runner with the ability to off load the ball, Vagana rarely missed a game for the Bradford Bulls and became one of the most popular players at the club. He also wrote a weekly column for several Bradford newspapers and the Bradford Bulls' website. In 2006 Vagana was awarded the Bradford Bulls' Clubman of the Year Award. He signed a one-year extension on 18 August 2006 to keep him at the Bradford Bulls for the 2007 season. After a long absence he was called up by New Zealand for their game against Great Britain in 2006 but did not play in the match. In June 2007 Vagana signed another one-year contract with Bradford, signalling his intent to play out the 2008 season. Vagana was sent off for the first time in his Bulls career against Wakefield Trinity Wildcats on 5 August 2007. In August 2007 he was named in Bradford's team of the Century. In 2008 whilst playing for Bradford against Wigan Vagana broke his arm attempting to tackle Stuart Fielden. Vagana retired at the end of the 2008 season after 8 years with the Bradford Bulls. In 2009 and 2010 he coached the East Coast Bays Barracudas alongside Willie Swann.
