= Stuart Spruce =

English RL coach and former GB & England international rugby league footballer

Personal information
- Full name: Stuart Arthur Spruce
- Born: 3 January 1971 (age 55)

Playing information
- Height: 6 ft 0 in (1.83 m)
- Weight: 15 st 2 lb (96 kg)
- Position: Fullback
Club
Years	Team	Pld	T	G	FG	P
1990–96	Widnes	127	41	7	0	178
1996–01	Bradford Bulls	86	46	0	0	184
2002–03	Widnes Vikings	54	22	0	0	88
	Total	267	109	7	0	450
Representative
Years	Team	Pld	T	G	FG	P
1992–00	England	3	1	0	0	4
1993–96	Great Britain	6	0	0	0	0

Coaching information
Club
Years	Team	Gms	W	D	L	W%
2004	Widnes Vikings	0	0	0	0

Stuart Arthur Spruce (born 3 January 1971) is an English former professional rugby league footballer who played in the 1980s, 1990s and 2000s. He played as a fullback for the Widnes Vikings and the Bradford Bulls, and represented England and Great Britain at international level.

== Playing career ==
=== Widnes ===
Stuart Spruce made his début for Widnes during the 1989–90 season, under coach Doug Laughton. When regular fullback Alan Tait quit for Leeds, Spruce became the permanent fullback. Bradford Bulls paid a record £120,000 for a fullback when they signed Spruce in May 1996. The previous record of £90,000 was paid by St Helens to Warrington for David Lyon in September 1992.

=== Bradford Bulls ===
Spruce played for Bradford Bulls at fullback in the 1999 Super League Grand Final which was lost to St. Helens. He became known as a good defensive player and an excellent offense. James Lowes, who played with him throughout his time with Bradford, paid this tribute: "Stuart has been one of the best fullbacks of his generation. He is a great talker on the field and a devastating runner."

He played for Bradford until the week before the 2001 Rugby League Challenge Cup Final, when he announced his retirement due to injury.

=== Return to Widnes ===
Spruce came out of retirement to play for Widnes during their inaugural Super League season in 2002. He made a total of 54 appearances before retiring permanently at the end of the 2003 Super League season.

=== International honours ===
Spruce won caps for England while at Widnes in 1992 against Wales and while at Bradford Bulls in 2000 against Russia (sub) and Fiji, and won caps for Great Britain while at Widnes in 1993 against France, and while at Bradford Bulls in 1996 against Papua New Guinea, Fiji, and New Zealand (3 matches).

== Coaching ==
Stuart served briefly as caretaker head coach after Neil Kelly left.
