= Paul Deacon =

English rugby player and coach (born 1979)

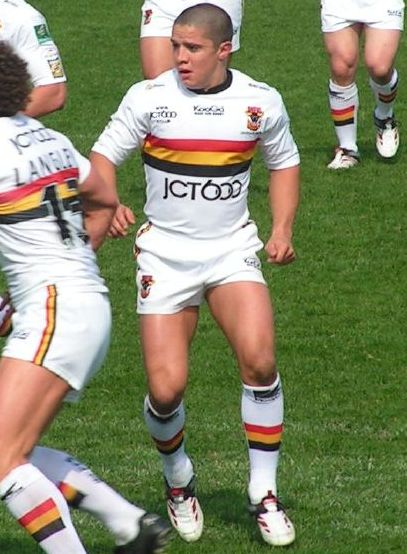

Personal information
- Full name: Paul Deacon
- Born: 13 February 1979 (age 47) Wigan, Greater Manchester, England
- Height: 5 ft 8 in (1.73 m)
- Weight: 12 st 11 lb (81 kg)

Playing information
- Position: Scrum-half, Stand-off
Club
Years	Team	Pld	T	G	FG	P
1997	Oldham Bears	4	0	0	0	0
1998–09	Bradford Bulls	326	75	1140	25	2605
2010–11	Wigan Warriors	49	5	17	0	54
	Total	379	80	1157	25	2659
Representative
Years	Team	Pld	T	G	FG	P
1999–01	England	7	2	0	0	8
2001–05	Great Britain	11	2	9	0	26
2001–03	Lancashire	4	2	6	0	20

Coaching information
Club
Years	Team	Gms	W	D	L	W%
2020–2025	Sale Sharks	3	0	0	3	0
2025	Wigan Warriors
	Total	3	0	0	3	0
- Source: As of 11 August 2025

Paul Deacon (born 13 February 1979) is an English rugby league coach, and former rugby union coach, who is currently an assistant head coach of the Wigan Warriors in Super League.

A Great Britain, and England international representative stand-off or scrum-half, he played in the Super League for Oldham Bears, the Bradford Bulls (who named him in their "Team of the Century", having won the 2001, 2003 and 2005 Super League Grand Finals, the 2003 Challenge Cup, and the 2002 World Club Challenge), and his home-town club, the Wigan Warriors (with whom he won the 2010 Super League Grand Final and 2011 Challenge Cup).

Following his departure from Sale Sharks, it was announced that Deacon had rejoined Wigan, as an assistant coach, working alongside head coach Matthew Peet.

== Playing career ==
=== Early career ===
Hailing from Standish near Wigan, a former Hindley amateur, Deacon made his senior professional début four days before his 18th birthday as a substitute for Oldham in a 48–6 Challenge Cup fourth round home victory over Rochdale Hornets on 9 February 1997. He made only four appearances for Oldham before moving to the Bradford Bulls.

=== Bradford Bulls ===
Deacon scored a try and goal on his début for the Bradford Bulls at scrum-half in a 36–10 Super League home victory over Huddersfield Giants on 28 June 1998. Deacon played for the Bradford Bulls from the interchange bench in the 1999 Super League Grand Final which was lost to St. Helens.

He went on to be one of Bradford Bulls' key players, a superb organiser with a tremendous kicking game. Deacon played for the Bradford Bulls from the interchange bench in their 2001 Super League Grand Final victory against the Wigan Warriors. As Super League VI champions, the Bradford Bulls played against 2001 NRL Premiers, the Newcastle Knights in the 2002 World Club Challenge. Deacon played at scrum-half, kicking eight goals and one field goal in Bradford Bulls' victory. Deacon played for the Bradford Bulls at scrum-half, kicking three goals in their 2002 Super League Grand Final loss against St. Helens. He was awarded the Harry Sunderland Trophy as grand final man-of-the-match despite being on the losing side. In the seasons of 2002 and 2003 Deacon's goal kicking percentage was near 80%. Deacon played for the Bradford Bulls at scrum-half, kicking six goals and one drop goal in their 2003 Super League Grand Final victory against the Wigan Warriors. He also played for the Bradford Bulls at scrum-half in their 2004 Super League Grand Final loss against the Leeds Rhinos.

Deacon played for the Bradford Bulls at scrum-half, kicking three goal from five attempts in their 2005 Super League Grand Final victory against Leeds Rhinos. On 23 June 2006, Paul Deacon broke the record points scored for a Bradford Northern/Bradford Bulls player (1,834), which was previously held by Keith Mumby.

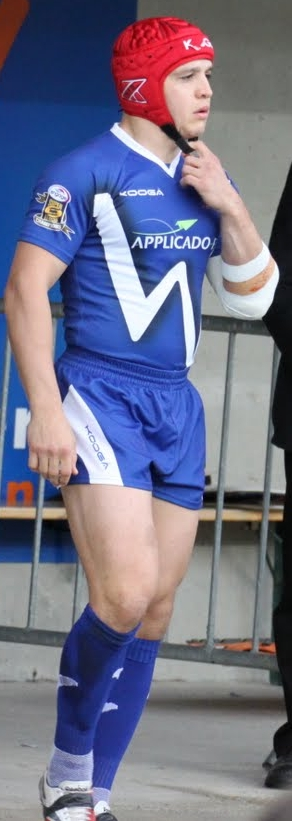
Deacon taking the field for Wigan in 2011

In 2007 Paul became the Bradford Bulls captain taking over from Iestyn Harris. In August 2007 he was named in Bradford Bull' Team of the Century. In September 2007 Deacon reached 2,000 goals for the Bradford Bulls. In 2008 Deacon celebrated his testimonial year with the Bradford Bulls after 10-years of service for the Super League club. As well as a testimonial match against his hometown club Wigan Warriors in January, Paul Deacon's name also appeared on all away jerseys to commemorate his loyalty to the Bradford Bulls. On 16 April 2008 Paul signed a new 2-year contract until 2010. In November 2009, Deacon signed for Wigan after 11-years at the Bradford Bulls.

=== Wigan ===
Deacon appeared in his first Grand Final in 5-years by playing in the 2010 Super League Grand Final victory over St Helens at Old Trafford.

Deacon played in the 2011 Challenge Cup Final 28–18 victory over the Leeds Rhinos at Wembley Stadium.

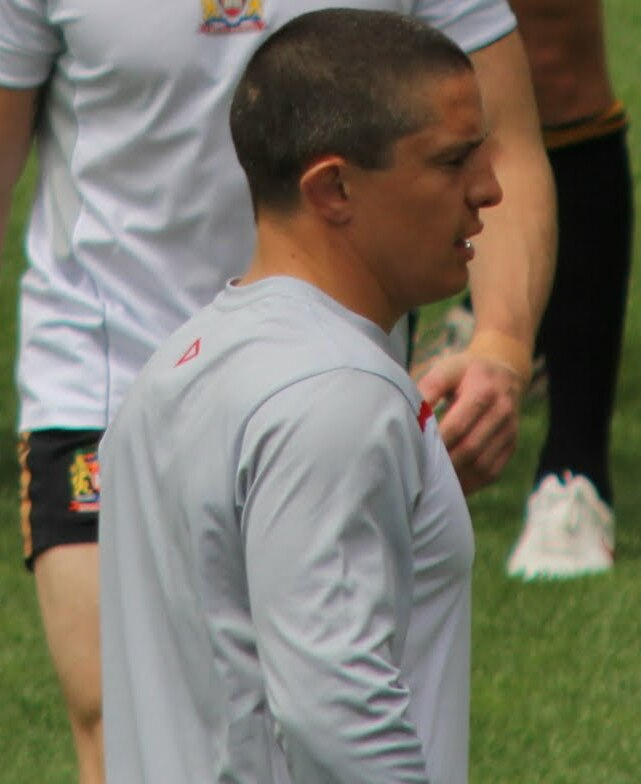
Deacon warming up for the Wigan Warriors in 2012

=== International career ===
Deacon won caps for England while at the Bradford Bulls in 1999 against France (2 matches). Deacon played for England in their 2000 World Cup campaign against Russia, Fiji, Ireland and New Zealand, and in 2001 against Wales. He was forced to rule himself out of contention for the England training squad for the 2008 Rugby League World Cup through injury.

For Great Britain he won caps while at the Bradford Bulls in 2001 against France and Australia. He represented Great Britain in 2002 against New Zealand (3 matches), in 2003 against Australia (2 matches, plus 1 as sub). He played in the 2005 Tri Nations against Australia and New Zealand (2 matches). Deacon was recalled for the Great Britain train-on squad for the 2007 test series with New Zealand, but pulled out due to injury.

== Coaching career ==
=== Rugby league ===
Following his retirement from playing, Deacon joined Wigan's coaching staff where he remained for four years.

In 2013, Deacon was appointed assistant to Steve McNamara at the England national rugby league team, just before the beginning of the 2013 Rugby League World Cup.

=== Rugby union ===
In July 2015 it was confirmed that Deacon would switch codes and join Premiership rugby union side Sale Sharks as attack/skills coach. He was promoted to head coach in December 2020 following the departure of director of rugby Steve Diamond.

He left the position of head coach at Sale Sharks at the end of the 2024–25 season.

== Statistics ==
=== Club career ===
Year	Club	Apps	Pts	T	G	FG
1998	Bradford Bulls	13	24	4	4	-
1999	Bradford Bulls	28	69	1	32	1
2000	Bradford Bulls	27	85	9	23	3
2001	Bradford Bulls	27	78	6	25	4
2002	Bradford Bulls	28	319	6	147	1
2003	Bradford Bulls	29	313	9	137	3
2004	Bradford Bulls	28	276	7	123	2
2005	Bradford Bulls	31	359	12	153	5
2006	Bradford Bulls	28	264	7	118	-
2007	Bradford Bulls	21	216	5	98	-
2008	Bradford Bulls	12	109	1	52	1

=== Representative career ===
Year	Team	Matches	Tries	Goals	Field Goals	Points
1999	England	2	0	0	0	
2000	England	4	0	0	0	
2001	England	4	0	0	0	
2002	Great Britain	3	0	0	0	
2003	Great Britain	3	0	6	0	12
2004	Great Britain	0	0	0	0	
2005	Great Britain	3	1	3	0	10
