= Stuart Fielden =

Great Britain and England international rugby league footballer

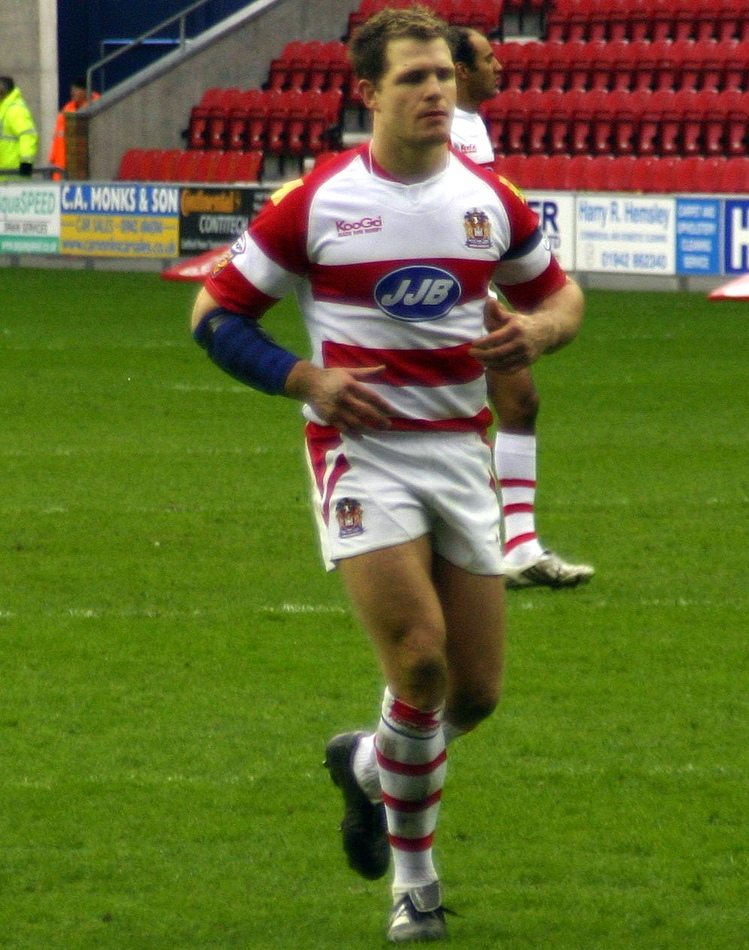
- Fielden playing for Wigan in 2008

Personal information
- Full name: Stuart Fielden
- Born: 14 September 1979 (age 47) Halifax, West Yorkshire, England

Playing information
- Height: 6 ft 3 in (191 cm)
- Weight: 17 st (110 kg)
- Position: Prop, Second-row
Club
Years	Team	Pld	T	G	FG	P
1998–06	Bradford Bulls	224	43	0	0	172
2006–12	Wigan Warriors	139	3	0	0	12
2013	Huddersfield Giants	9	0	0	0	0
	Total	372	46	0	0	184
Representative
Years	Team	Pld	T	G	FG	P
2000–08	England	10	0	0	0	0
2001–06	Great Britain	25	2	0	0	8
	Yorkshire
- Relatives: Jamie Fielden (brother)

Stuart Fielden (born 14 September 1979) is an English former professional rugby league footballer who played in the 1990s, 2000s and 2010s. He was formerly an assistant coach for the Huddersfield Giants in the Super League, and now is a Personal trainer of Fielden Fitness in Leeds. A Great Britain international representative forward, he played his club rugby for Bradford Bulls with whom he won the 2001, 2003 and 2005 Super League Championships, 2000 and 2003 Challenge cups and World Club championships in 2002, 2004, 2006 before he moved to Wigan Warriors for a record transfer fee in 2006, winning the 2010 Super League Championship with them. He then signed with Huddersfield Giants in 2013 but played only a handful of games (9) before injury forced him into retirement. Fielden won 2 individual awards of young player of the year (2000) and International best forward (2005).He was named in 4 super league and 4 International dream teams.

== Early life ==
Fielden was born in Halifax, West Yorkshire, England. He grew up in the village of Old Town near Hebden Bridge.

It was not until he was in his teens that he started playing rugby league with Halifax amateur side Illingworth ARLFC. It was during his time with Illingworth that Bradford signed him.

== Playing career ==
=== Bradford ===
Stuart made his Bradford Bulls début against his hometown club Halifax in May 1998. He played for them at front row forward in the 1999 Super League Grand Final which was lost to St. Helens. Fielden made rapid progress alongside experienced props Joe Vagana, Brian McDermott and Paul Anderson, and was named Super League's young player of the year in 2000.

Fielden played for the Bradford Bulls from the interchange bench and scored a try in their 2001 Super League Grand Final victory against the Wigan Warriors. As Super League VI champions, the Bradford Bulls played against 2001 NRL Premiers, the Newcastle Knights in the 2002 World Club Challenge. Fielden was selected for the interchange bench in Bradford Bulls' victory. He also played for Bradford Bulls at front row forward in their 2002 Super League Grand Final loss against St. Helens. Fielden played for the Bradford Bulls at prop forward in their 2003 Super League Grand Final victory against the Wigan Warriors. Having won Super League VIII, Bradford Bulls played against 2003 NRL Premiers, the Penrith Panthers in the 2004 World Club Challenge. Fielden played as a prop forward in the Bradford Bulls' 22–4 victory. He also played for Bradford Bulls at prop forward in their 2004 Super League Grand Final loss against the Leeds Rhinos.

in 2005 Fielden narrowly escaped the 2004 Indian Ocean tsunami while holidaying in Thailand. He played for the Bradford Bulls at prop forward in their 2005 Super League Grand Final victory against the Leeds Rhinos. As Super League champions Bradford Bulls faced National Rugby League premiers Wests Tigers in the 2006 World Club Challenge. Fielden played at prop and scored two tries in the Bradford Bulls' 30–10 victory.

Fielden won numerous honours and trophies while at Bradford Bulls, with a trademark aggressive style that saw him establish a reputation as one of the best and most feared front-rowers in the world. In February 2006 he won his last trophy with Bradford Bulls, being named Man-of-the-Match and scoring two tries in the World Club Challenge match against Wests Tigers. Many claimed following this match that Stuart was indeed the best prop in the world. He did not miss a game for the club in his last two seasons at Bradford Bulls and was an automatic choice for the Great Britain national rugby league team for the majority of his Bradford Bulls career.

In August 2007 he was named in Bradford Bulls' team of the Century.

=== Wigan Warriors ===
On 22 June 2006 Stuart made a shock switch from Bradford Bulls to join his old coach Brian Noble at Wigan Warriors. Wigan Warriors and Bradford Bulls agreed a transfer fee of £450,000 making it the most expensive cash only transfer of the Super League era. Stuart made his Wigan Warriors début against the Warrington Wolves on 23 June 2006 at the JJB Stadium. He was instrumental in helping his new club to avoid relegation in the remainder of the 2006 season.

In the 2010 season however his form improved with the rest of the team that topped the league for most of the season. His performances were outstanding in a Wigan Warriors team that was again performing well. An iconic moment in the revival of Stuart Fielden happened on Sunday 15 August in a match against the Huddersfield Giants involving a bust up between Fielden and Huddersfield Giants' prop Keith Mason. Mason stamped on Fielden's ankle sparking a brawl which involved 'nearly all 26 players'. Mason seemed to want nothing to do with the incensed Fielden and Darrell Griffin took the fall for it. Subsequently, both men were sin binned. Fielden went on to have a fantastic game, playing like in his iconic aggressive style whilst at Bradford Bulls.

He played in the 2010 Super League Grand Final victory over St. Helens at Old Trafford.

Fielden took part in a boxing match, The Rumble by the Humber, against fellow rugby league player, Lee Radford which raised in excess of £60,000 for former team-mate Steve Prescott. He lost the fight after it was stopped in the second round.

Fielden's 2011 season began with a slow start. He was ruled out of Wigan Warriors' opening fixture against St. Helens following a knee operation, but recovered in time for Wigan Warriors' next match against the Bradford Bulls. He did not feature in the World Club Challenge squad that faced St George Illawarra Dragons, and on 9 March was confirmed as needing another knee operation which would keep him sidelined for four months.

Fielden played his final game for the Wigan Warriors against St. Helens in the final regular season home match of 2012. He was released by the Wigan Warriors at the conclusion of the season.

=== Huddersfield Giants ===
Fielden signed a two-year contract with Huddersfield Giants on 12 October 2012. In July 2013 he declared a change of allegiance from England to play for the Ireland national rugby league team in the end-of-season 2013 World Cup. However the following month the 33-year-old forward was forced to announce his retirement effective immediately due to a knee infection.

=== International ===
Fielden won caps for England while at Bradford Bulls in 2000 against Australia, Russia (sub), Fiji (sub), Ireland and New Zealand, and won caps for Great Britain while at Bradford Bulls in 2001 against Australia, Australia (sub) (2 matches), and France (sub), in 2002 against Australia, and New Zealand (3 matches), in 2003 against Australia (3 matches), in 2004 against Australia (3 matches), and New Zealand (2 matches); in 2005 against Australia (2 matches), New Zealand (2 matches).

Fielden was selected in the Great Britain team to compete in the end of season 2004 Rugby League Tri-Nations tournament. In the final against Australia he played at prop in the Lions' 44–4 loss.

Fielden won caps for Great Britain while at Wigan Warriors in 2006 against New Zealand (3 matches), and Australia (2 matches). He featured in the 2006 Tri-Nations tournament. During this tournament, in a match against Australia, he was involved in an altercation with Australian forward Willie Mason in which Mason punched Fielden, knocking him out.

Achievements
Preceded by Paul Newlove	Rugby league transfer record Bradford Bulls to Wigan Warriors; 2006–2013	Succeeded by Sam Tomkins
