= Tevita Vaikona =

Tonga international rugby league footballer

Personal information
- Born: 18 August 1974 (age 51) Tonga

Playing information
- Height: 187 cm (6 ft 2 in)
- Weight: 101 kg (15 st 13 lb)

Rugby league
- Position: Wing
Club
Years	Team	Pld	T	G	FG	P
1994	Canterbury Country	21	14	0	0	56
1994–97	Hull FC	95	79	0	0	316
1998–04	Bradford Bulls	147	90	0	0	360
	Total	263	183	0	0	732
Representative
Years	Team	Pld	T	G	FG	P
1994	Canterbury
1995–00	Tonga	6	4	0	0	16

Rugby union
Club
Years	Team	Pld	T	G	FG	P
2004–07	Saracens F.C.	0	0	0	0	0
2007–08	Racing Metro	0	0	0	0	0
2008	Hull RUFC	9	3	0	0	0
	Total	9	3	0	0	0
Representative
Years	Team	Pld	T	G	FG	P
2002–2002	Tonga 7s	2	2	0	0	0
2006	Tonga	4	5	0	0	25

Tevita Vaikona (born 18 August 1974) is a Tongan professional rugby league and rugby union footballer, a winger who played rugby league and picked up many honours before switching codes to rugby union. In 2002, Vaikona was voted best rugby league winger in the world.

== Early years ==
Vaikona started playing rugby league when he was studying in Christchurch, New Zealand, at Lincoln University. He made the Junior Kiwis in 1994 and in 1994 Vaikona played for the Canterbury Country Cardinals in the Lion Red Cup and represented both Canterbury, New Zealand Universities and the New Zealand Residents.

== Professional playing career ==
=== Rugby league ===
Vaikona moved to Hull FC in 1994 and played alongside fellow Cantabrian Shane Endacott. Vaikona was selected for Tonga in the 1995 World Cup.

In the Rugby League First Division he played for Hull FC, and in the Super League he played for the Bradford Bulls where his tries and powerful play saw him voted the best rugby league wing in the World. Vaikona played for the Bradford Bulls on the wing in the 1999 Super League Grand Final which was lost to St Helens

Vaikona also played for Tonga in the 2000 Rugby League World Cup and was his country's top try-scorer for the tournament. Vaikona played for the Bradford Bulls on the wing in their 2001 Super League Grand Final victory over the Wigan Warriors. As Super League VI champions, the Bradford Bulls played against 2001 NRL Premiers, the Newcastle Knights in the 2002 World Club Challenge. Vaikona played on the wing in Bradford Bulls' victory. He was a Junior Kiwi and was called up for New Zealand in 2002 but did not play a match. Vaikona played for the Bradford Bulls on the wing in their 2002 Super League Grand Final loss against St. Helens. Vaikona played for the Bradford Bulls on the wing in their 2003 Super League Grand Final victory over the Wigan Warriors. Having won Super League VIII, Bradford played against 2003 NRL Premiers, the Penrith Panthers in the 2004 World Club Challenge. Vaikona played on the wing in the Bradford Bulls' 22–4 victory.

=== Rugby union ===
While still playing rugby league, Vaikona played Rugby sevens for Tonga at the 2002 Commonwealth Games.

Vaikona joined North London-based Saracens from Bradford Bulls in 2004 and went on to score a try on his début a few months later. In his first season in rugby union, he was the top off-loader in the premiership during the 2004/05 season. He has also represented Tonga on numerous occasions. He was not selected for the squad for the 2007 World Cup. He is a rugby sevens athlete, having represented Tonga in the Commonwealth games and both the Bradford Bulls and the Saracens in the Twickenham sevens.

He was also named Player of the Season during his first year at the Saracens. Injury stalled his 2005/06 campaign, but he soon came back to where he left off although 2006–07 was a less successful season in terms of points scored. He is known for his offloading ability, which has led to numerous tries for his club.

In April 2007, Saracens announced that Tevita was leaving the club for pastures new and he signed a two-year contract with a French outfit, Racing Metro, Paris where he played during the 2007/08 season.

In February 2008 Tevita signed for Hull Rugby Union Football Club on a two-year contract and made a try scoring début against Birkenhead Park on 1 March 2008.

== Administration career ==
Tevita worked as the Director of Rugby at Hull Rugby Union Football Club and later as the Director of Sport at Bishop Burton College in the East Riding.
