= 2001 Super League season =

Season in rugby league

Super League VI
- League: Super League
- Duration: 28 Rounds
- Teams: 12
- Highest attendance: 21,073; Wigan Warriors vs St. Helens (13 April)
- Lowest attendance: 1,800; London Broncos vs Huddersfield Giants (26 Aug)
- Broadcast partners: Sky Sports

2001 Season
- Champions: Bradford Bulls; 2nd Super League title 4th British title
- League Leaders: Bradford Bulls
- Man of Steel: (England) Paul Sculthorpe
- Top point-scorer: (England) Andrew Farrell (388)
- Top try-scorer: (England) Kris Radlinski (27)

Promotion and relegation
- Promoted from Northern Premiership: Widnes Vikings
- Relegated to Northern Premiership: Huddersfield Giants

Tetley's Super League VI was the official name for the year 2001's Super League championship season, the 107th season of top-level professional rugby league football in Britain, and the sixth championship run by the Super League. The season began on the first weekend in March and culminated after twenty-eight rounds in a six-game playoff series, involving the top 5 teams.

== Rule changes ==
- 20 metre restarts should be allowed to happen quickly and not be delayed by referees.
- The first and second halves will now end the moment that the hooter sounds, in the past referees could use their discretion to let play continue if they felt the siren had sounded in during play.

=== Refereeing focus ===
The play-the-ball was to be more strictly refereed:

- Penalising those teams that attempt to delay or interfere with the tackled player. Following a pre-season meeting with coaches the RFL's director of rugby, Greg McCallum, identified the following delaying tactics that would be monitored for:
  - "Flopping" onto the player tackled or pushing them down in a "second effort".
  - Straddling the tackled player.
  - Pulling at the tackled player's leg as they get to their feet.
  - Making contact with the ball in the tackled player's arms.
  - Putting a hand on the shoulders or head of the tackled player.
  - Deliberately knocking into ball-carriers at play-the-ball.
- Team-mates of tackled players should not attempt to manhandle tacklers off the player in possession.
- Attacking players must make at least an attempt to play the ball correctly with the foot.
- Players "milking" penalties would be punished.

=== Rule deviation ===
- The Rugby Football League opted to retain their existing substitution system of six changes from four available substitutes but allowing unlimited use of the blood bin. This put British rugby league at odds with international interchange rules and impacted preparation for international competitions.

== Operational rules ==
- Match commissioners were introduced by the League as a first point of contact for clubs that wish to raise and issue resulting from a match. The introduction of this system follows a successful trial during the 2000 World Cup.

== Table ==
Pos	Team	Pld	W	D	L	PF	PA	PD	Pts	Qualification
1	Bradford Bulls (L, C)	28	22	1	5	1120	474	+646	45	Semi Final
2	Wigan Warriors	28	22	1	5	989	494	+495	45	Qualifying play-off
3	Hull F.C.	28	20	2	6	772	630	+142	42	Qualifying play-off
4	St Helens	28	17	2	9	924	732	+192	36	Elimination play-off
5	Leeds Rhinos	28	16	1	11	774	721	+53	33	Elimination play-off
6	London Broncos	28	13	1	14	644	603	+41	27	
7	Warrington Wolves	28	11	2	15	646	860	−214	24	
8	Castleford Tigers	28	10	1	17	581	777	−196	21	
9	Halifax Blue Sox	28	9	0	19	630	819	−189	18	
10	Salford City Reds	28	8	0	20	587	956	−369	16	
11	Wakefield Trinity Wildcats	28	8	0	20	529	817	−288	14 (Note: Wakefield deducted 2 points for salary cap breaches.)	
12	Huddersfield Giants (R)	28	6	1	21	613	926	−313	13	Relegation to Northern Ford Premiership

Source: Rugby League Project
Rules for classification: 1) Points; 2) Points difference; 3) Number of points scored;
(C) Champions; (L) League Leaders; (R) Relegated

== Play-offs ==
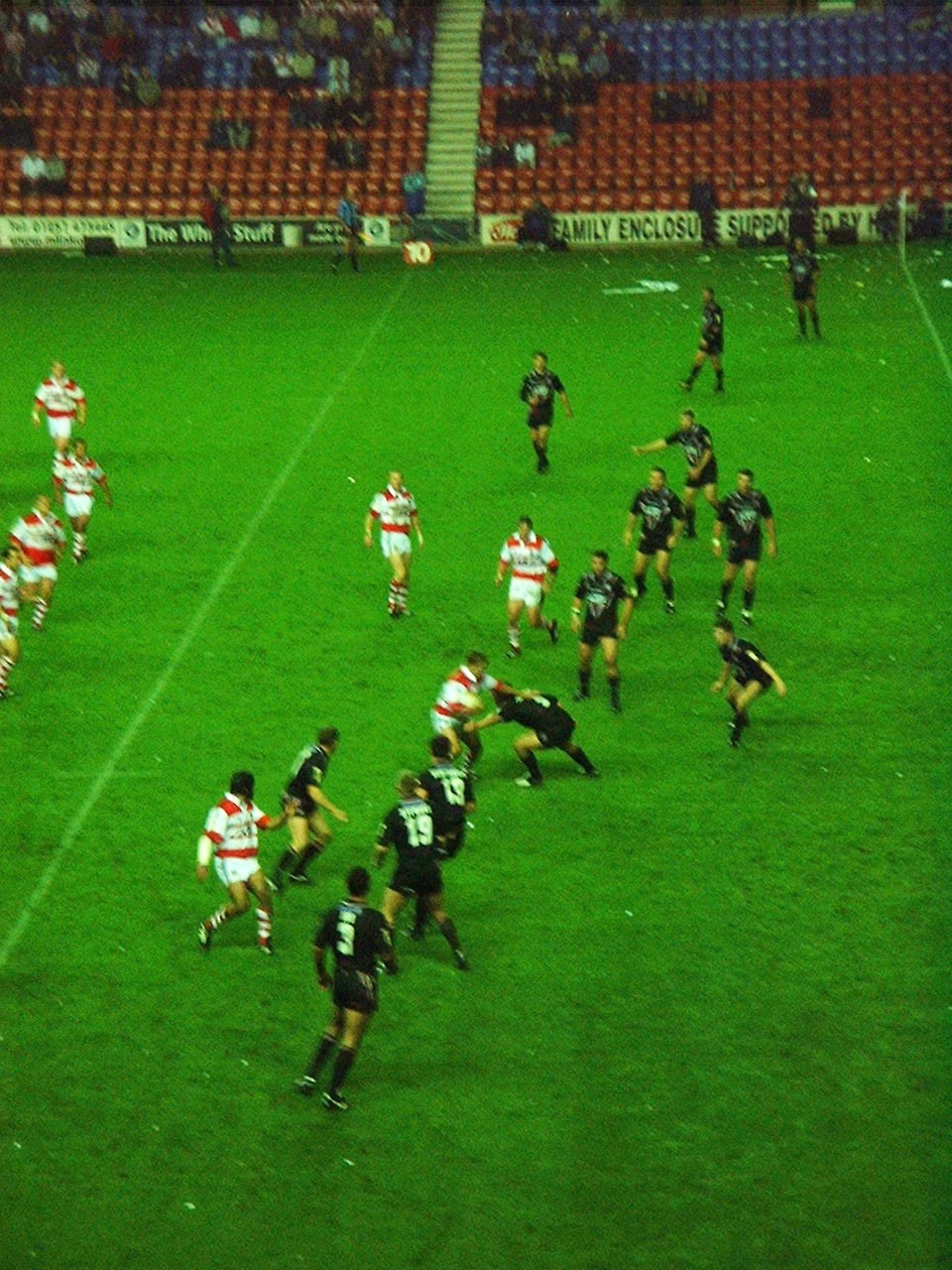
Wigan vs St Helens in the preliminary final

=== Grand Final ===
The Grand Final, played on October 13 at Old Trafford, was won by Bradford Bulls who defeated Wigan Warriors to become champions. This was legendary Australian centre Steve Renouf's last game of top-level football before retirement.
