= 2004 Bradford Bulls season =

- Super League IX Rank: 2nd
- Play-off result: Runners Up
- Challenge Cup: 4th Round
- 2004 record: Wins: 22; draws: 1; losses: 9
- Points scored: For: 984; against: 627

Team information
- Chairman: Chris Caisley
- Head Coach: Brian Noble
- Captain: Robbie Paul
- Stadium: Odsal Stadium
- Avg. attendance: 11,459
- High attendance: 23,375 vs. Leeds Rhinos

Top scorers
- Tries: Lesley Vainikolo (39)
- Goals: Paul Deacon (124)
- Points: Paul Deacon (282)
| ← 2003 | List of seasons | 2005 → |

This article details the Bradford Bulls rugby league football club's 2004 season, the ninth season of the Super League era.

== Season review ==
February 2004

Bradford started the 2004 season off by beating Penrith Panthers 22–4 in the World Club Challenge to become World Champions for the second time. The Bulls start to the regular season rounds could not have been better as Lesley Vainikolo set a Super League record with the most tries in a match scoring five in Bradford's 34–6 win against Wigan Warriors. The Bulls could not retain their Challenge Cup title as they were knocked out in Round 4 as St Helens R.F.C. beat them 30–10.

March 2004

Bradford continued their run of form with a comprehensive 40–6 win against Wakefield Trinity Wildcats. The Bulls kept their league winning streak going with a hard fought 20–6 win against Yorkshire rivals Huddersfield Giants.

April 2004

The Bulls started April by grinding out a 25–18 win against Salford City Reds. Bradford's first league loss of the season came in Round 5 against arch rivals Leeds Rhinos who came out 26–18 winners. The Bulls picked themselves up after this defeat and hammered St Helens R.F.C. 54–8 with Shontayne Hape scoring a hat-trick. Bradford lost for the second time this season as Hull F.C. beat them 26–18 with Shaun Briscoe scoring four tries for the Hull side. The Bulls finished the month with a 22–22 draw at Warrington Wolves.

May 2004

Bradford started May with a much needed 24–12 win against London Broncos. The Bulls then beat Castleford Tigers 44–18 with Stuart Reardon scoring four tries. Bradford kept their winning run on track with a 30–20 win against Widnes Vikings. The month finished badly for the Bulls as their winning streak was broken in a 35–30 loss to St Helens R.F.C.

June 2004

The start of June was a poor one for Bradford as they lost 26–12 to arch-rivals Leeds Rhinos. Bradford soon got back on track as they beat Salford City Reds 35–28 in a hard fought match. The Bulls also posted an impressive 40–12 win against Huddersfield Giants with Paul Deacon kicking them to victory with 10 goals. Bradford finished the month with a 38–30 win against Widnes Vikings.

July 2004

The Bulls started July well as they smashed Castleford Tigers 60–12 with Lesley Vainikolo stealing the spotlight with four tries, he then scored another two the following week in a 36–26 win against the Wakefield Trinity Wildcats. The good start to the month came to an end as the Bulls lost 32–16 to Wigan Warriors. Bradford recovered from this defeat and beat London Broncos 44–16.

August 2004

Bradford's month got off to a bad start as they lost 25–14 to Hull F.C. keeping the Bulls fifth in the table. The Bulls got their season back on track with a hard fought 36–22 win against Warrington Wolves thanks to a Lesley Vainikolo hat-trick. Bradford backed this win up with an outstanding 38–12 win against Wigan Warriors with Iestyn Harris leading the way with two tries and a goal. The Bulls were brought crashing back to earth as league leaders and arch-rivals Leeds Rhinos beat them 40–12, the Bulls were down to 12 men for at least 20 minutes of the match as Leon Pryce received two sin-bins. Bradford finished the month strong as they beat Hull F.C. 26–12, Lesley Vainikolo scored his fourth hat-trick of the year to help the Bulls get the much needed win.

September 2004

The Bulls continued their charge to second in the league as they beat woeful London Broncos 60–18, Shontayne Hape scored a hat-trick, Logan Swann and Rob Parker also scored two tries each to help the Bulls get the win. Bradford continued their winning end to the season with a nail biting 28–27 win against Warrington Wolves where Paul Deacon's two late drop-goals secured the points for the Yorkshire side. The Bulls finished the regular season by thumping St Helens R.F.C. 64–24, both Stuart Reardon and Lesley Vainikolo grabbed hat-tricks whilst Hape scored two tries to help the Bradford team finish the 2004 season second in the league.

October 2004

Bradford qualified for the 2004 Grand Final by defeating arch rivals Leeds Rhinos in the Qualifying Semi-final. The Bulls came out as 26–12 winner thanks to tries from Robbie Paul, Lee Radford, Lesley Vainikolo and a double from Shontayne Hape. However Leeds soon got revenge as they defeated the Bulls 16–8 in the Grand Final.

== 2004 milestones ==
- WCC: Logan Swann scored his 1st try for the Bulls.
- Round 1: Aaron Smith scored his 1st try for the Bulls.
- Round 1: Lesley Vainikolo scored his 1st five-try haul, 1st four-try haul and 3rd hat-trick for the Bulls.
- Round 2: Chris Bridge and Paul Johnson scored their 1st tries for the Bulls.
- Round 2: Tevita Vaikona scored his 100th try and reached 400 points for the Bulls.
- Round 6: Shontayne Hape scored his 1st hat-trick for the Bulls.
- Round 6: Michael Withers reached 400 points for the Bulls.
- Round 7: Lesley Vainikolo scored his 50th try and reached 200 points for the Bulls.
- Round 10: Stuart Reardon scored his 1st four-try haul and 1st hat-trick for the Bulls.
- Round 10: Paul Deacon reached 1,100 points for the Bulls.
- Round 11: Leon Pryce scored his 75th try and reached 300 points for the Bulls.
- Round 12: Karl Pratt scored his 1st hat-trick for the Bulls.
- Round 14: Chris Bridge kicked his 1st goal for the Bulls.
- Round 15: Shontayne Hape scored his 25th try and reached 100 points for the Bulls.
- Round 16: Andy Smith scored his 1st try for the Bulls.
- Round 17: Lesley Vainikolo scored his 2nd four-try haul and 4th hat-trick for the Bulls.
- Round 19: Paul Deacon kicked his 500th goal and reached 1,200 points for the Bulls.
- Round 20: Iestyn Harris kicked his 1st goal for the Bulls.
- Round 22: Lesley Vainikolo scored his 5th hat-trick for the Bulls.
- Round 23: Iestyn Harris scored his 1st try for the Bulls.
- Round 25: Lesley Vainikolo scored his 6th hat-trick for the Bulls.
- Round 26: Shontayne Hape scored his 2nd hat-trick for the Bulls.
- Round 28: Stuart Reardon scored his 2nd hat-trick for the Bulls.
- Round 28: Lesley Vainikolo scored his 7th hat-trick for the Bulls.
- Qualifying Semi-final: Lesley Vainikolo scored his 75th try and reached 300 points for the Bulls.
- Qualifying Semi-final: Paul Deacon reached 1,300 points for the Bulls.

== Table ==
Super League IX
| Pos. | Team | Pld | W | D | L | PF | PA | PD | Pts | Qual. |
|---|---|---|---|---|---|---|---|---|---|---|
| 1 | Leeds Rhinos | 28 | 24 | 2 | 2 | 1037 | 443 | +594 | 50 | Play-off semi-final |
| 2 | Bradford Bulls | 28 | 20 | 1 | 7 | 918 | 565 | +353 | 41 | Play-off semi-final |
| 3 | Hull | 28 | 19 | 2 | 7 | 843 | 478 | +365 | 40 | Play-off elimination final |
| 4 | Wigan Warriors | 28 | 17 | 4 | 7 | 736 | 558 | +178 | 38 | Play-off elimination final |
| 5 | St. Helens | 28 | 17 | 1 | 10 | 821 | 662 | +159 | 35 | Play-off elimination final |
| 6 | Wakefield Trinity Wildcats | 28 | 15 | 0 | 13 | 788 | 662 | +126 | 30 | Play-off elimination final |
| 7 | Huddersfield Giants | 28 | 12 | 0 | 16 | 518 | 757 | −239 | 24 | |
| 8 | Warrington Wolves | 28 | 10 | 1 | 17 | 700 | 715 | −15 | 21 | |
| 9 | Salford City Reds | 28 | 8 | 0 | 20 | 507 | 828 | −321 | 16 | |
| 10 | London Broncos | 28 | 7 | 1 | 20 | 561 | 968 | −407 | 15 | |
| 11 | Widnes Vikings | 28 | 7 | 0 | 21 | 466 | 850 | −384 | 14 | |
| 12 | Castleford Tigers | 28 | 6 | 0 | 22 | 515 | 924 | −409 | 12 | Relegated to National League 1 |

Source: Rugby League Project.
Classification: 1st on competition points; 2nd on match points difference.
Competition points: for win = 2; for draw = 1; for loss = 0.

== World Club Challenge ==
LEGEND
| Win |
| Draw |
| Loss |

| Date | Competition | Vrs | H/A | Venue | Result | Score | Tries | Goals | Att |
|---|---|---|---|---|---|---|---|---|---|
| 13 February 2004 | WCC | Penrith Panthers | N | McAlpine Stadium | W | 22–4 | Vainikolo, L.Pryce, Swann, Parker | Withers 3/5, Radford 0/1 | 18,962 |

2004 World Club Challenge Teams
| Bradford Bulls | positions | Penrith Panthers |
|---|---|---|
| 6. Michael Withers | Fullback | 1. Rhys Wesser |
| 2. Tevita Vaikona | Winger | 2. Brett Howland |
| 16. Paul Johnson | Centre | 3. Luke Lewis |
| 4. Shontayne Hape | Centre | 4. Paul Whatuira |
| 5. Lesley Vainikolo | Winger | 5. Luke Rooney |
| 3. Leon Pryce | Stand off | 6. Preston Campbell |
| 15. Karl Pratt | Scrum half | 7. Craig Gower |
| 29. Stuart Fielden | Prop | 8. Joel Clinton |
| 24. Aaron Smith | Hooker | 9. Luke Priddis |
| 10. Paul Anderson | Prop | 10. Martin Lang |
| 11. Lee Radford | 2nd Row | 11. Joe Galuvao |
| 12. Jamie Peacock | 2nd Row | 12. Tony Puletua |
| 13. Logan Swann | Loose forward | 13. Trent Waterhouse |
| 8. Joe Vagana | Interchange | 14. Ben Ross |
| 17. Stuart Reardon | Interchange | 15. Colin Ward |
| 19. Jamie Langley | Interchange | 16. Shane Rodney |
| 27. Rob Parker | Interchange | 17. Luke Swain |
| Brian Noble | Coach | John Lang |

== 2004 fixtures and results ==
LEGEND
| Win |
| Draw |
| Loss |

2004 Tetley's Super League

| Date | Competition | Rnd | Vrs | H/A | Venue | Result | Score | Tries | Goals | Att |
|---|---|---|---|---|---|---|---|---|---|---|
| 20 February 2004 | Super League IX | 1 | Wigan Warriors | H | Odsal Stadium | W | 34–6 | Vainikolo (5), Smith, Withers | Withers 3/7 | 17,267 |
| 7 March 2004 | Super League IX | 2 | Wakefield Trinity Wildcats | A | Belle Vue | W | 40–6 | Bridge (2), Vaikona (2), Vainikolo (2), Johnson, Reardon | Deacon 4/8 | 6,472 |
| 21 March 2004 | Super League IX | 3 | Huddersfield Giants | A | McAlpine Stadium | W | 20–6 | Johnson (2), Deacon | Deacon 4/4 | 8,039 |
| 2 April 2004 | Super League IX | 4 | Salford City Reds | H | Odsal Stadium | W | 25–18 | Deacon, Johnson, L.Pryce, Vainikolo | Deacon 4/4, Withers 1 DG | 11,790 |
| 8 April 2004 | Super League IX | 5 | Leeds Rhinos | A | Headingley Stadium | L | 18–26 | Hape, Vaikona, Vainikolo | Deacon 3/3 | 21,225 |
| 12 April 2004 | Super League IX | 6 | St. Helens | H | Odsal Stadium | W | 54–8 | Hape (3), Vaikona (2), Vainikolo (2), Withers (2), Langley, Radford | Deacon 1/5, Withers 3/4, Paul 1/2 | 15,623 |
| 23 April 2004 | Super League IX | 8 | Hull F.C. | H | Odsal Stadium | L | 18–26 | Deacon, Hape | Deacon 5/5 | 12,684 |
| 27 April 2004 | Super League IX | 7 | Warrington Wolves | A | Halliwell Jones Stadium | D | 22–22 | Withers (2), Smith, Vainikolo | Deacon 3/4 | 8,111 |
| 3 May 2004 | Super League IX | 9 | London Broncos | A | Griffin Park | W | 24–12 | Reardon (2), Deacon, Langley, L.Pryce | Deacon 2/5 | 3,987 |
| 9 May 2004 | Super League IX | 10 | Castleford Tigers | H | Odsal Stadium | W | 44–18 | Reardon (4), Langley (2), Vainikolo (2) | Deacon 6/8 | 12,877 |
| 23 May 2004 | Super League IX | 11 | Widnes Vikings | A | Halton Stadium | W | 30–20 | L.Pryce (2), Hape, Johnson, Smith | Deacon 5/5 | 6,615 |
| 29 May 2004 | Super League IX | 12 | St. Helens | A | Knowsley Road | L | 30–35 | Pratt (3), Anderson, Parker | Deacon 5/5 | 10,993 |
| 5 June 2004 | Super League IX | 13 | Leeds Rhinos | H | Odsal Stadium | L | 12–26 | Reardon, Vainikolo | Deacon 2/2 | 23,375 |
| 13 June 2004 | Super League IX | 14 | Salford City Reds | A | The Willows | W | 35–28 | Johnson (2), Vainikolo (2), Bridge, Hape | Bridge 4/4, Withers 1/2, Withers 1 DG | 5,003 |
| 20 June 2004 | Super League IX | 15 | Huddersfield Giants | H | Odsal Stadium | W | 40–12 | Hape (2), Fielden, Reardon, Swann | Deacon 10/10 | 11,069 |
| 27 June 2004 | Super League IX | 16 | Widnes Vikings | H | Odsal Stadium | W | 38–30 | Paul (2), Pratt (2), Johnson, L.Pryce, Smith | Deacon 3/5, Bridge 2/2 | 11,137 |
| 4 July 2004 | Super League IX | 17 | Castleford Tigers | A | The Jungle | W | 60–12 | Vainikolo (4), Hape (2), Deacon, Parker, Peacock, L.Pryce | Deacon 10/10 | 6,606 |
| 11 July 2004 | Super League IX | 18 | Wakefield Trinity Wildcats | H | Odsal Stadium | W | 36–26 | Vainikolo (2), Deacon, Parker, Peacock, Reardon | Deacon 6/6 | 12,670 |
| 16 July 2004 | Super League IX | 19 | Wigan Warriors | A | JJB Stadium | L | 16–32 | Hape, Peacock, Swann | Deacon 2/3 | 15,102 |
| 25 July 2004 | Super League IX | 20 | London Broncos | H | Odsal Stadium | W | 44–16 | Vainikolo (2), Fielden, Langley, Paul, Reardon, Smith, Swann | Deacon 4/5, Harris 2/3 | 10,283 |
| 1 August 2004 | Super League IX | 21 | Hull F.C. | A | KC Stadium | L | 14–25 | Hape, Paul | Deacon 3/3 | 14,124 |
| 8 August 2004 | Super League IX | 22 | Warrington Wolves | H | Odsal Stadium | W | 36–22 | Vainikolo (3), Bridge, Hape, Reardon | Deacon 6/6 | 12,891 |
| 13 August 2004 | Super League IX | 23 | Wigan Warriors | H | Odsal Stadium | W | 38–12 | Harris (2), Hape, Langley, Paul, L.Pryce, Vainikolo | Deacon 4/5, Harris 1/2 | 12,610 |
| 20 August 2004 | Super League IX | 24 | Leeds Rhinos | A | Headingley Stadium | L | 12–40 | Harris, Swann | Deacon 2/2 | 21,225 |
| 30 August 2004 | Super League IX | 25 | Hull F.C. | A | KC Stadium | W | 26–12 | Vainikolo (3), Harris, Langley | Deacon 3/5 | 13,593 |
| 5 September 2004 | Super League IX | 26 | London Broncos | H | Odsal Stadium | W | 60–18 | Hape (3), Parker (2), Swann (2), Fielden, Vagana, Withers | Deacon 10/10 | 11,319 |
| 12 September 2004 | Super League IX | 27 | Warrington Wolves | A | Halliwell Jones Stadium | W | 28–27 | Harris (2), Hape, Langley, Vainikolo | Deacon 3/5, Deacon 2 DG | 10,008 |
| 19 September 2004 | Super League IX | 28 | St. Helens | H | Odsal Stadium | W | 64–24 | Reardon (3), Vainikolo (3), Hape (2), Deacon, Peacock, Withers | Deacon 10/11 | 13,127 |

== Challenge Cup ==
LEGEND
| Win |
| Draw |
| Loss |

| Date | Competition | Rnd | Vrs | H/A | Venue | Result | Score | Tries | Goals | Att |
|---|---|---|---|---|---|---|---|---|---|---|
| 29 February 2004 | Cup | 4th | St. Helens | H | Odsal Stadium | L | 10–30 | Deacon, Radford | Deacon 1/2 | 12,215 |

== Playoffs ==
LEGEND
| Win |
| Draw |
| Loss |

| Date | Competition | Rnd | Vrs | H/A | Venue | Result | Score | Tries | Goals | Att |
|---|---|---|---|---|---|---|---|---|---|---|
| 2 October 2004 | Play-offs | QSF | Leeds Rhinos | A | Headingley Stadium | W | 26–12 | Hape (2), Paul, Radford, Vainikolo | Deacon 3/5 | 21,225 |
| 16 October 2004 | Play-offs | GF | Leeds Rhinos | N | Old Trafford | L | 8–16 | Hape, Vainikolo | Deacon 0/2 | 65,537 |

== 2004 squad statistics ==
- Appearances and Points include (Super League, Challenge Cup and Play-offs) as of 2012.

| No | Player | Position | Tries | Goals | DG | Points |
|---|---|---|---|---|---|---|
| 1 | Robbie Paul | Fullback | 6 | 1 | 0 | 26 |
| 2 | Tevita Vaikona | Wing | 5 | 0 | 0 | 20 |
| 3 | Leon Pryce | Centre | 8 | 0 | 0 | 32 |
| 4 | Shontayne Hape | Centre | 24 | 0 | 0 | 96 |
| 5 | Lesley Vainikolo | Wing | 39 | 0 | 0 | 156 |
| 6 | Michael Withers | Fullback | 7 | 10 | 2 | 50 |
| 7 | Paul Deacon | Scrum-half | 8 | 124 | 2 | 282 |
| 8 | Joe Vagana | Prop | 1 | 0 | 0 | 4 |
| 10 | Paul Anderson | Prop | 1 | 0 | 0 | 4 |
| 11 | Lee Radford | Second row | 3 | 0 | 0 | 12 |
| 12 | Jamie Peacock | Second row | 4 | 0 | 0 | 16 |
| 13 | Logan Swann | Loose forward | 7 | 0 | 0 | 28 |
| 14 | Toa Kohe-Love | Centre | 0 | 0 | 0 | 0 |
| 15 | Karl Pratt | Stand off | 5 | 0 | 0 | 20 |
| 16 | Paul Johnson | Centre | 8 | 0 | 0 | 32 |
| 17 | Stuart Reardon | Fullback | 15 | 0 | 0 | 60 |
| 18 | Iestyn Harris | Stand off | 6 | 3 | 0 | 30 |
| 19 | Jamie Langley | Loose forward | 8 | 0 | 0 | 32 |
| 20 | Matt Cook | Prop | 0 | 0 | 0 | 0 |
| 22 | Karl Pryce | Wing | 0 | 0 | 0 | 0 |
| 23 | Vinny Myler | Prop | 0 | 0 | 0 | 0 |
| 24 | Aaron Smith | Hooker | 3 | 0 | 0 | 12 |
| 25 | Brett Ferres | Second row | 0 | 0 | 0 | 0 |
| 26 | Chris Bridge | Centre | 4 | 6 | 0 | 28 |
| 27 | Rob Parker | Prop | 6 | 0 | 0 | 24 |
| 28 | Nicky Saxton | Fullback | 0 | 0 | 0 | 0 |
| 29 | Stuart Fielden | Prop | 3 | 0 | 0 | 12 |
| 30 | Richard Moore | Wing | 0 | 0 | 0 | 0 |
| 31 | Richard Colley | Scrum-half | 0 | 0 | 0 | 0 |
| 32 | Andy Smith | Wing | 2 | 0 | 0 | 8 |
