= 2005 Bradford Bulls season =

- Super League X Rank: 3rd
- Play-off result: Winners
- Challenge Cup: 5th round
- 2005 record: Wins: 23; draws: 1; losses: 10
- Points scored: For: 1295; against: 770

Team information
- Chairman: Chris Caisley
- Head Coach: Brian Noble
- Captain: Jamie Peacock
- Stadium: Odsal Stadium
- Avg. attendance: 13,523
- High attendance: 22,843 vs. Leeds Rhinos

Top scorers
- Tries: Lesley Vainikolo (34)
- Goals: Paul Deacon (169)
- Points: Paul Deacon (391)
← 2004	List of seasons	2006 →

This article details the Bradford Bulls rugby league football club's 2005 season, the 10th season of the Super League era.

== Season review ==
February 2005

The Bulls started their campaign with a 28–16 loss to Wakefield Trinity Wildcats, Iestyn Harris, Jamie Langley and Karl Pryce all scored for the Bulls whilst Paul Deacon kicked 2 goals. Bradford continued their poor start to the season by losing 31–22 to Widnes Vikings, Iestyn Harris, Karl Pryce, Leon Pryce and Andy Smith scored tries whilst Deacon kicked 3 goals. Bradford finally got their first win of the season by beating Wigan Warriors 28–27. Iestyn Harris, Jamie Langley, Jamie Peacock, Stuart Reardon and Michael Withers all scored and Deacon kicked 4 conversions.

March 2005

Bradford started March with a 48–22 win over London Broncos. Paul Deacon and Lesley Vainikolo both scored 2 tries whilst Paul Johnson, Jamie Langley, Brad Meyers, Robbie Paul and Karl Pryce also scored. Deacon added 6 goals. The Bulls continued their good form as they hammered Leigh Centurions 46–6, Iestyn Harris and Karl Pryce both grabbed a brace each while Deacon, Langley, Rob Parker, Leon Pryce and Vainikolo all scored 1 a piece. Deacon added 5 goals. Bradford grabbed another win as they beat Hull F.C. 32–22. Iestyn Harris, Andy Lynch, Karl Pryce and Leon Pryce all scored tries and Deacon kicked 8 goals to ensure Bradford won the game. Bradford's winning streak came to an abrupt halt as they lost 42–12 to rivals Leeds Rhinos. Karl Pryce and Stuart Reardon scored the Bulls only tries and Deacon converted both. The final game of the month saw the Bulls lose to St Helens R.F.C. Lynch scored a brace of tries and scored from Robbie Paul and Karl Pryce wasn't enough to get the win, Deacon also kicked 5 goals and a drop goal.

April 2005

The Bulls progressed in the Challenge Cup by beating Featherstone Rovers 80–14. Robbie Paul and Andy Smith grabbed hat-tricks, Iestyn Harris and Brett Ferres scored a brace each. Rob Parker, Stuart Fielden, Leon Pryce and Karl Pratt also scored. Paul Deacon kicked 11 goals and Joe Vagana also kicked 1. Bradford's poor form in the league was extended as Warrington Wolves beat them 35–32, Jamie Langley and Lesley Vainikolo both scored two tries each whilst Brad Meyers and Michael Withers also crossed, Deacon kicked 4 goals. Bradford recorded a 54–10 win over the Huddersfield Giants, Vainikolo scored a hat-trick, Stuart Reardon scored two, Stuart Fielden, Jamie Langley, Robbie Paul, Karl Pratt and Lee Radford wrapped up the scoring. Deacon kicked a goal and Iestyn Harris kicked six. The Bulls beat Wigan Warriors 40–8 in a one sided affair, Brad Meyers scored a brace whilst Fielden, Paul, Reardon, Vainikolo and Withers also scored tries. Deacon kicked 6 goals.

May 2005

The Bulls started May with a big win over London Broncos. The Bradford side ran out 41–22 winners with tries coming from Stuart Fielden, Iestyn Harris, Jamie Langley, Jamie Peacock, Karl Pryce, Leon Pryce and Stuart Reardon. Paul Deacon kicked 6 goals and also knocked over a drop goal. Bradford's Challenge Cup was ended by a strong Hull F.C. side. The Bulls went down 26–24 with Peacock, Lesley Vainikolo (2) and Karl Pryce all scoring, Deacon kicked 4 goals. Their league form was still going strong with a 58–0 win against Salford City Reds, Karl Pryce and Deacon both scored hat-tricks whilst Vainikolo grabbed 2 tries. Other scores came with tries from Rob Parker, Karl Pratt and Leon Pryce, Deacon kicked 7 goals. The following week Bradford lost 44–24 to Warrington Wolves, Iestyn Harris, Peacock, Reardon and Vainikolo scored tries and Deacon converted all 4. In revenge for their Challenge Cup loss the Bulls hammered Hull F.C. 42–24. Tries came from Leon Pryce (2), Brett Ferres, Brad Meyers, Karl Pryce and Reardon, Deacon managed to kick all 9 goals.

June 2005

Bradford didn't get off to a good start in June as they were beat 66–4 by St Helens R.F.C. with Stuart Reardon scoring Bradford's only try. They followed this defeat with a 38–20 win against Huddersfield Giants, Robbie Paul scored 2 tries whilst Ben Harris, Rob Parker, Karl Pryce, Lee Radford and Reardon also touched down to score. Paul Deacon added 5 goals to ensure a Bradford win. However their next game against Widnes Vikings ended in an 18–18 draw, Paul scored 2 tries, Deacon and Radford also crossed to score tries and Deacon kicked 4 goals and a drop goal.

July 2005

July started off with two defeats for the Bulls. The first was a 36–26 loss to archrivals Leeds Rhinos. Tries came from Paul Johnson (2), Ben Harris, Brad Meyers and Jamie Peacock whilst Paul Deacon kicked 3 goals. The second defeat at the start of July came at the hands of Wakefield Trinity Wildcats who beat Bradford 44–34. Karl Pratt claimed a hat-trick while Deacon, Meyers and Michael Withers also scored, Deacon kicked 5 goals. However the Bulls got back to winning ways with a 58–12 win over Leigh Centurions. Ben Harris grabbed a hat-trick, Stuart Fielden, Iestyn Harris, Ian Henderson, Meyers, Pratt, Leon Pryce and Withers all scored tries. Deacon kicked 6 goals and Iestyn Harris kicked 3 goals. This win was followed by a hard fought 24–18 victory against Salford City Reds, Deacon, Iestyn Harris, Karl Pryce and brother Leon Pryce all scored tries whilst Deacon kicked 3 goals and Iestyn Harris slotted over a goal to ensure the win.

August 2005

Bradford's first game in August was against Widnes Vikings, the Bulls racked up a 74–24 win against the struggling side. Shontayne Hape, Stuart Reardon, Lesley Vainikolo and Michael Withers all scored 2 tries each while Stuart Fielden, Iestyn Harris, Andy Lynch, Jamie Peacock and Leon Pryce all took a try a piece. Paul Deacon kicked 11 goals to round off a huge victory. This was followed by a 58–12 win against Salford City Reds. Hape and Iestyn Harris both grabbed 2 tries, Deacon, Paul Johnson, Lynch, Peacock, Leon Pryce and Vainikolo also scored with Deacon kicked 7 goals and Iestyn Harris kicked 2 goals. The Bulls last game in August came against their old rivals Leeds Rhinos, this time Bradford managed a 42–10 win. Hape grabbed a hat-trick while Deacon, Iestyn Harris, Jamie Langley, Lynch and Robbie Paul rounded off the tries, Deacon kicked 5 goals.

September 2005

Lesley Vainikolo had an outstanding start to September as he scored a Super League record 6 tries in the 49–6 win over Hull FC, other tries came from Stuart Fielden, Shontayne Hape, Jamie Peacock and Joe Vagana. Paul Deacon kicked 4 goals and a drop goal. This win was followed up by a 52–34 victory over the Huddersfield Giants. Tries were scored by Paul Johnson (2), Vainikolo (2), Deacon, Fielden, Ian Henderson, Brad Meyers and Lee Radford. Deacon kicked 8 goals to ensure victory. The last league game of the season came against St Helens R.F.C. at Knowsley Road. The Bulls won 32–18 with Johnson and Vainikolo scoring a brace of tries, Ben Harris and Leon Pryce rounded off the try scoring whilst Deacon kicked 4 goals. This win meant the Bulls finished the season on an 8-game winning streak and finished the league in 3rd place. The playoffs pitted Bradford against London Broncos, the Bulls came away with a convincing 44–22 win, Iestyn Harris scored 2 tries, Vainikolo scored 2 tries with Hape, Henderson, Peacock and Karl Pryce all grabbing a try a piece. Iestyn Harris kicked 5 goals while Karl Pryce kicked 1 goal.

October 2005

The next round of the playoffs saw Bradford against Hull FC, the Bulls achieved a record playoff win as they coasted to a 71–0 win. Lesley Vainikolo scored 4 tries, Ian Henderson grabbed a brace while Stuart Fielden, Shontayne Hape, Iestyn Harris, Paul Johnson, Jamie Peacock and Michael Withers also crossed for tries. Paul Deacon kicked 10 goals, Robbie Paul kicked a goal and Iestyn Harris kicked a drop goal. In the semi-final the Bulls beat St Helens R.F.C. 23–18, Hape grabbed 2 tries, Johnson also crossed for a try and Jamie Langley grabbed the winner. Deacon kicked 4 goals and a drop goal to ensure the Bulls a place in the Grand Final. The Grand Final marked the 6th consecutive appearance for the Bulls and it pitted them in a rematch of the 2004 Grand Final as they faced arch enemies Leeds Rhinos. The Bulls won 15–6 with Vainikolo and Leon Pryce scoring, Deacon kicked 3 goals and Iestyn Harris slotted a drop goal to give the Bulls their 4th Super League title. It also marked the last game for Bradford legend Robbie Paul as he moved to Huddersfield Giants.

== 2005 milestones ==
- Round 1: Karl Pryce scored his 1st try for the Bulls.
- Round 4: Brad Meyers scored his 1st try for the Bulls.
- Round 6: Andy Lynch scored his 1st try for the Bulls.
- CCR4: Robbie Paul scored his 9th hat-trick for the Bulls.
- CCR4: Andy Smith scored his 1st hat-trick for the Bulls.
- CCR4: Brett Ferres scored his 1st try for the Bulls.
- CCR4: Paul Deacon reached 1,400 points for the Bulls.
- CCR4: Joe Vagana kicked his 1st goal for the Bulls.
- Round 10: Lesley Vainikolo scored his 8th hat-trick for the Bulls.
- Round 10: Lee Radford reached 100 points for the Bulls.
- Round 11: Stuart Reardon scored his 25th try and reached 100 points for the Bulls.
- Round 11: Paul Deacon kicked his 600th goal for the Bulls.
- Round 13: Paul Deacon scored his 1st hat-trick for the Bulls.
- Round 13: Karl Pryce scored his 1st hat-trick for the Bulls.
- Round 13: Paul Deacon scored his 50th try for the Bulls.
- Round 15: Paul Deacon reached 1,500 points for the Bulls.
- Round 20: Karl Pratt scored his 2nd hat-trick for the Bulls.
- Round 20: Michael Withers scored his 100th try for the Bulls.
- Round 21: Ben Harris scored his 1st hat-trick for the Bulls.
- Round 21: Ian Henderson scored his 1st try for the Bulls.
- Round 23: Iestyn Harris reached 100 points for the Bulls.
- Round 24: Paul Deacon reached 1,600 points for the Bulls.
- Round 25: Shontayne Hape scored his 3rd hat-trick for the Bulls.
- Round 26: Lesley Vainikolo scored his 1st six-try haul, 2nd five-try haul, 3rd four-try haul and 9th hat-trick for the Bulls.
- Round 27: Lesley Vainikolo scored his 100th try and reached 400 points for the Bulls.
- Round 28: Paul Deacon kicked his 700th goal for the Bulls.
- EPO: Karl Pryce kicked his 1st goal for the Bulls.
- ESF: Lesley Vainikolo scored his 4th four-try haul and 10th hat-trick for the Bulls.
- ESF: Shontayne Hape scored his 50th try and reached 200 points for the Bulls.
- ESF: Iestyn Harris scored his 25th try for the Bulls.
- ESF: Iestyn Harris kicked his 1st drop goal for the Bulls.

== Table ==
Pos	Team	Pld	W	D	L	PF	PA	PD	Pts	Qualification or relegation
1	St Helens	28	23	1	4	1028	537	+491	47	Semi Final
2	Leeds Rhinos	28	22	0	6	1152	505	+647	44	Semi Final
3	Bradford Bulls	28	18	1	9	1038	684	+354	37	Elimination Semi Final
4	Warrington Wolves	28	18	0	10	792	702	+90	36	Elimination Semi Final
5	Hull F.C.	28	15	2	11	756	670	+86	32	Elimination Semi Final
6	London Broncos	28	13	2	13	800	718	+82	28	Elimination Semi Final
7	Wigan Warriors	28	14	0	14	698	718	−20	28	
8	Huddersfield Giants	28	12	0	16	742	791	−49	24	
9	Salford City Reds	28	11	0	17	549	732	−183	22	
10	Wakefield Trinity Wildcats	28	10	0	18	716	999	−283	20	
11	Widnes Vikings	28	6	1	21	598	1048	−450	13	Relegation to National League One
12	Leigh Centurions	28	2	1	25	445	1210	−765	5	Relegation to National League One

Source: Rugby League Project
Rules for classification: 1) Points; 2) Points difference; 3) Number of points scored;

== 2005 fixtures and results ==
LEGEND
Win
Draw
Loss

2005 Tetley's Super League

Date	Competition	Rnd	Vrs	H/A	Venue	Result	Score	Tries	Goals	Att
13 February 2005	Super League X	1	Wakefield Trinity Wildcats	H	Odsal Stadium	L	16–28	I.Harris, Langley, K.Pryce	Deacon 2/3	15,137
20 February 2005	Super League X	2	Widnes Vikings	A	Halton Stadium	L	22–31	I.Harris, K.Pryce, L.Pryce, Smith	Deacon 3/4	7,230
25 February 2005	Super League X	3	Wigan Warriors	A	JJB Stadium	W	28–27	I.Harris, Langley, Peacock, Reardon, Withers	Deacon 4/5	13,111
6 March 2005	Super League X	4	London Broncos	H	Odsal Stadium	W	48–22	Deacon (2), Vainikolo (2), Johnson, Langley, Meyers, Paul, K.Pryce	Deacon 6/9	11,282
11 March 2005	Super League X	5	Leigh Centurions	A	The Coliseum	W	46–6	I.Harris (2), K.Pryce (2), Deacon, Langley, Parker, L.Pryce, Vainikolo	Deacon 5/9	4,241
18 March 2005	Super League X	6	Hull F.C.	H	Odsal Stadium	W	32–22	I.Harris, Lynch, K.Pryce, L.Pryce	Deacon 8/8	13,394
24 March 2005	Super League X	7	Leeds Rhinos	H	Odsal Stadium	L	12–42	K.Pryce, Reardon	Deacon 2/2	22,843
28 March 2005	Super League X	8	St. Helens	A	Knowsley Road	L	27–34	Lynch (2), Paul, K.Pryce	Deacon 5/5, Deacon 1 DG	12,364
10 April 2005	Super League X	9	Warrington Wolves	A	Halliwell Jones Stadium	L	32–35	Langley (2), Vainikolo (2), Meyers, Withers	Deacon 4/6	10,654
17 April 2005	Super League X	10	Huddersfield Giants	H	Odsal Stadium	W	54–10	Vainikolo (3), Reardon (2), Fielden, Langley, Paul, Pratt, Radford	Deacon 1/4, I.Harris 6/6	13,481
22 April 2005	Super League X	11	Wigan Warriors	H	Odsal Stadium	W	40–8	Meyers (2), Fielden, Paul, Reardon, Vainikolo, Withers	Deacon 6/7	13,527
1 May 2005	Super League X	12	London Broncos	A	Griffin Park	W	41–26	Fielden, I.Harris, Langley, Peacock, K.Pryce, L.Pryce, Reardon	Deacon 6/7, Deacon 1 DG	3,879
13 May 2005	Super League X	13	Salford City Reds	A	The Willows	W	58–0	Deacon (3), K.Pryce (3), Vainikolo (2), Parker, Pratt, L.Pryce	Deacon 7/11	4,102
22 May 2005	Super League X	14	Warrington Wolves	H	Odsal Stadium	L	24–44	I.Harris, Peacock, Reardon, Vainikolo	Deacon 4/4	14,428
28 May 2005	Super League X	15	Hull F.C.	A	KC Stadium	W	42–24	L.Pryce (2), Ferres, Meyers, K.Pryce, Reardon	Deacon 9/9	11,563
5 June 2005	Super League X	16	St. Helens	H	Odsal Stadium	L	4–66	Reardon	Deacon 0/1	15,260
11 June 2005	Super League X	17	Huddersfield Giants	A	Galpharm Stadium	W	38–20	Paul (2), B.Harris, Parker, K.Pryce, Radford, Reardon	Deacon 5/7	6,022
19 June 2005	Super League X	18	Widnes Vikings	H	Odsal Stadium	D	25–25	Paul (2), Deacon, Radford	Deacon 4/4, Deacon 1 DG	10,715
1 July 2005	Super League X	19	Leeds Rhinos	A	Headingley Stadium	L	26–36	Johnson (2), B.Harris, Meyers, Peacock	Deacon 3/5	21,225
10 July 2005	Super League X	20	Wakefield Trinity Wildcats	A	Belle Vue	L	34–44	Pratt (3), Deacon, Meyers, Withers	Deacon 5/6	5,984
17 July 2005	Super League X	21	Leigh Centurions	H	Odsal Stadium	W	58–12	B.Harris (3), Fielden, I.Harris, Henderson, Meyers, Pratt, L.Pryce, Withers	Deacon 6/6, I.Harris 3/3	10,294
22 July 2005	Super League X	22	Salford City Reds	A	The Willows	W	24–18	Deacon, I.Harris, K.Pryce, L.Pryce	Deacon 3/3, I.Harris 1/1	3,684
7 August 2005	Super League X	23	Widnes Vikings	H	Odsal Stadium	W	74–24	Hape (2), Reardon (2), Vainikolo (2), Withers (2), Fielden, I.Harris, Lynch, Peacock, L.Pryce	Deacon 11/13	10,128
14 August 2005	Super League X	24	Salford City Reds	H	Odsal Stadium	W	58–12	Hape (2), I.Harris (2), Deacon, Johnson, Lynch, Peacock, L.Pryce, Vainikolo	Deacon 7/8, I.Harris 2/2	10,113
19 August 2005	Super League X	25	Leeds Rhinos	A	Headingley Stadium	W	42–10	Hape (3), Deacon, I.Harris, Langley, Lynch, Paul	Deacon 5/8	20,220
2 September 2005	Super League X	26	Hull F.C.	H	Odsal Stadium	W	49–6	Vainikolo (6), Fielden, Hape, Peacock, Vagana	Deacon 4/10, Deacon 1 DG	13,326
11 September 2005	Super League X	27	Huddersfield Giants	H	Odsal Stadium	W	52–34	Johnson (2), Vainikolo (2), Deacon, Fielden, Henderson, Meyers, Radford	Deacon 8/9	13,207
17 September 2005	Super League X	28	St. Helens	A	Knowsley Road	W	32–18	Johnson (2), Vainikolo (2), B.Harris, L.Pryce	Deacon 4/7	11,064

== Challenge Cup ==
LEGEND
Win
Draw
Loss

Date	Competition	Rnd	Vrs	H/A	Venue	Result	Score	Tries	Goals	Att
3 April 2005	Cup	4th	Featherstone Rovers	H	Odsal Stadium	W	80–14	Paul (3), Parker, Fielden, L.Pryce, I.Harris (2), Smith (3), Pratt, Ferres (2)	Deacon 11/12, Vagana 1/1	–
7 May 2005	Cup	5th	Hull F.C.	A	KC Stadium	L	24–26	Peacock, Vainikolo (2), K.Pryce	Deacon 4/4	–

== Playoffs ==
LEGEND
Win
Draw
Loss

Date	Competition	Rnd	Vrs	H/A	Venue	Result	Score	Tries	Goals	Att
23 September 2005	Play-offs	EPO	London Broncos	H	Odsal Stadium	W	44–22	I.Harris (2), Vainikolo (2), Hape, Henderson, Peacock, K.Pryce	I.Harris 5/7, K.Pryce 1/1	9,167
1 October 2005	Play-offs	ESF	Hull F.C.	H	Odsal Stadium	W	71–0	Vainikolo (4), Henderson (2), Fielden, Hape, I.Harris, Johnson, Peacock, Withers	Deacon 10/11, Paul 1/1, I.Harris 1 DG	13,148
7 October 2005	Play-offs	SF	St. Helens	A	Knowsley Road	W	23–18	Hape (2), Johnson, Langley	Deacon 4/5, Deacon 1 DG	11,604
15 October 2005	Play-offs	GF	Leeds Rhinos	N	Old Trafford	W	15–6	L.Pryce, Vainikolo	Deacon 3/5, I.Harris 1 DG	65,537

== 2005 squad statistics ==
- Appearances and Points include (Super League, Challenge Cup and Play-offs) as of 2004.

No	Player	Position	Tries	Goals	DG	Points
1	Robbie Paul	Stand Off	12	1	0	50
3	Leon Pryce	Stand Off	14	0	0	56
4	Shontayne Hape	Centre	12	0	0	48
5	Lesley Vainikolo	Wing	34	0	0	136
6	Michael Withers	Fullback	8	0	0	32
7	Paul Deacon	Scrum-half	12	169	5	391
8	Joe Vagana	Prop	1	1	0	6
9	Ian Henderson	Hooker	5	0	0	20
10	Brad Meyers	Prop	9	0	0	36
11	Lee Radford	Second Row	4	0	0	16
12	Jamie Peacock	Second Row	10	0	0	40
13	Ben Harris	Loose forward	6	0	0	24
14	Andy Lynch	Prop	6	0	0	24
15	Karl Pratt	Centre	7	0	0	28
16	Paul Johnson	Second Row	10	0	0	40
17	Stuart Reardon	Fullback	12	0	0	48
18	Iestyn Harris	Stand Off	19	17	2	112
19	Jamie Langley	Loose forward	10	0	0	40
20	Matt Cook	Prop	0	0	0	0
22	Karl Pryce	Wing	17	1	0	70
24	Andy Smith	Wing	4	0	0	16
25	Brett Ferres	Second Row	3	0	0	12
27	Rob Parker	Prop	4	0	0	16
29	Stuart Fielden	Prop	9	0	0	36
30	Adrian Morley	Prop	0	0	0	0
