= 2003 Bradford Bulls season =

- Super League VIII Rank: 1st
- Play-off result: Winners
- Challenge Cup: Winners
- 2003 record: Wins: 29; draws: 0; losses: 6
- Points scored: For: 1149; against: 637

Team information
- Chairman: Chris Caisley
- Head Coach: Brian Noble
- Captain: Robbie Paul
- Stadium: Odsal Stadium
- Avg. attendance: 15,284
- High attendance: 21,784 vs. Leeds Rhinos

Top scorers
- Tries: Lesley Vainikolo (26)
- Goals: Paul Deacon (173)
- Points: Paul Deacon (389)
← 2002	List of seasons	2004 →

This article details the Bradford Bulls rugby league football club's 2003 season, the 8th season of the Super League era.

== Season review ==
February 2003

The season started off well for the Bulls as they beat Warrington Wolves 38–12 in the 4th Round of the Challenge Cup. Bradford's start to the league campaign was shocking as they were hammered 46–22 by the 2002 champions St Helens R.F.C.

March 2003

Bradford continued their run in the Challenge Cup with an 82–0 victory over lower league Hunslet Hawks with Lesley Vainikolo grabbing a hat-trick. The Bulls got their 1st win of their league campaign with a hard-fought 22–10 win against Wakefield Trinity Wildcats. Bradford progressed to the semi-finals of the Challenge Cup by beating Widnes Vikings 38–28 in the quarter-final. The Bulls got their first back to back wins of the season with an outstanding 62–22 victory against Halifax Blue Sox, both James Lowes and Robbie Paul both grabbed hat-tricks. Bradford finished the month off with a hard-fought 26–18 win against Widnes Vikings.

April 2003

The Bulls continued their run of form by opening April with a comfortable 32–8 win over Warrington Wolves. Bradford progressed to the Challenge Cup Final as they beat Wigan Warriors 36–22 in the semi-final. The Bulls great league form continued with a 48–24 win over Hull FC. Bradford's month came to a spectacular end as they beat rivals Leeds Rhinos 22–20 to win the Challenge Cup. Tries from Robbie Paul, Jamie Peacock and Tevita Vaikona helped the Bulls win their 2nd Challenge Cup in the Super League era.

May 2003

The Bulls followed their Challenge Cup win with a hard-fought 14–8 win against Wigan Warriors. The Bulls good form continued with a hard-fought 30–10 win against Castleford Tigers which was made even harder when Leon Pryce was sent off. Bradford recorded a huge win as they beat Huddersfield Giants 52–6 with Robbie Paul scoring a hat-trick. The Bulls finished May with an impressive 48–22 win against arch rivals Leeds Rhinos.

June 2003

Bradford started June with an unfortunate 22–12 loss to London Broncos with Dennis Moran tearing the Bulls apart and scoring a hat-trick. The Bulls got back to winning ways as they edged out Hull F.C. to win the game 26–20. Bradford once again came away with the 2 points as they beat Warrington Wolves 24–20. The Bulls came crashing back to earth as Wigan Warriors beat them 35–22. Bradford then were demolished 35–0 by St Helens R.F.C. at the end of the month.

July 2003

The Bulls started July with a 30–18 win against Wakefield Trinity Wildcats to get the Bulls back to winning ways. Bradford backed this win up with a 60–12 victory over Halifax Blue Sox. The Bulls continued their fine form with a 40–8 win against Widnes Vikings. The streak continued with a 40–20 win over Castleford Tigers and then a 60–6 win against London Broncos where Leon Pryce scored 4 tries.

August 2003

Bradford continued their form into August as they beat Huddersfield Giants 30–16 and then followed this up by beating Leeds Rhinos 18–16 at Headingley Stadium. The Bulls also beat Hull F.C. 36–22 in the middle of the month before losing 26–12 to Wigan Warriors. Bradford bounced back and hammered London Broncos 54–12 with Paul Deacon becoming the highest point scorer for the Bulls in the Super League era as he booted over his 400th goal for the club.

September 2003

Bradford started September with a very narrow 22–21 win against arch rivals Leeds Rhinos, the Bulls won thanks to 2 drop goals from scum-half Paul Deacon. In the run up to the end of the season Bradford lost 28–14 to Castleford Tigers. The Bulls finished the regular rounds with a 22–18 win over St Helens R.F.C. which meant that Bradford finished top of the league ahead of Leeds Rhinos.

October 2003

The Bulls beat arch rivals Leeds Rhinos 30–14 in the Qualifying Semi-final to reach the 2003 Grand Final, in the process Paul Deacon became the first person to score 1,000 points for the Bradford Bulls in the Super League era. A couple of weeks later the Bulls would once again face Wigan Warriors in a Grand Final, the Bradford side won 25–12 after Shontayne Hape, Stuart Reardon and James Lowes (in his last game for the Bulls) all scored tries whilst Paul Deacon kicked 6 goals and a drop goal to make the Bulls Super League champions for a 3rd time.

== 2003 milestones ==
- CCR4: Shontayne Hape scored his 1st try for the Bulls.
- CCR4: Leon Pryce scored his 50th try and reached 200 points for the Bulls.
- CCR5: Lesley Vainikolo scored his 1st hat-trick for the Bulls.
- CCR5: Karl Pratt and Rob Parker scored their 1st tries for the Bulls.
- Round 2: Lee Radford kicked his 1st goal for the Bulls.
- Round 3: James Lowes scored his 1st hat-trick for the Bulls.
- Round 3: Robbie Paul scored his 7th hat-trick for the Bulls.
- Round 3: Stuart Reardon scored his 1st try for the Bulls.
- Round 3: Paul Deacon reached 700 points for the Bulls.
- CCSF: Paul Deacon kicked his 300th goal for the Bulls.
- Round 10: Robbie Paul scored his 8th hat-trick for the Bulls.
- Round 10: Paul Deacon reached 800 points for the Bulls.
- Round 11: Daniel Gartner scored his 25th try and reached 100 points for the Bulls.
- Round 15: Robbie Paul scored his 125th try and reached 500 points for the Bulls.
- Round 18: Lesley Vainikolo scored his 25th try and reached 100 points for the Bulls.
- Round 20: Paul Deacon reached 900 points for the Bulls.
- Round 7: Leon Pryce scored his 1st four-try haul and 2nd hat-trick for the Bulls.
- Round 7: Jamie Langley scored his 1st try for the Bulls.
- Round 23: Lesley Vainikolo scored his 2nd hat-trick for the Bulls.
- Round 25: James Lowes reached 400 points for the Bulls.
- Round 25: Paul Deacon kicked his 400th goal for the Bulls.
- Qualifying Semi-final: Paul Deacon reached 1,000 points for the Bulls.

== Table ==
Pos	Team	Pld	W	D	L	PF	PA	PD	Pts	Qualification
1	Bradford Bulls (L, C)	28	22	0	6	878	529	+349	44	Semi-final
2	Leeds Rhinos	28	19	3	6	751	555	+196	41	Semi-final
3	Wigan Warriors	28	19	2	7	776	512	+264	40	Elimination play-offs
4	St Helens	28	16	1	11	845	535	+310	31 (Note: St Helens deducted 2 points for salary cap breaches.)	Elimination play-offs
5	London Broncos	28	14	2	12	643	696	−53	30	Elimination play-offs
6	Warrington Wolves	28	14	1	13	748	619	+129	29	Elimination play-offs
7	Hull F.C.	28	13	3	12	701	577	+124	27 (Note: Hull F.C. deducted 2 points for salary cap breaches.)	
8	Castleford Tigers	28	12	1	15	612	633	−21	25	
9	Widnes Vikings	28	12	1	15	640	727	−87	25	
10	Huddersfield Giants	28	11	1	16	628	715	−87	23	
11	Wakefield Trinity Wildcats	28	7	1	20	505	774	−269	15	
12	Halifax (R)	28	1	0	27	372	1227	−855	0 (Note: Halifax deducted 2 points for salary cap breaches.)	Relegation to National League One

Source: Rugby League Project
Rules for classification: 1) Points; 2) Points difference; 3) Number of points scored;
(C) Champions; (L) League Leaders' Shield Winners; (R) Relegated

== 2003 Fixtures and results ==
LEGEND
Win
Draw
Loss

2003 Tetley's Super League

Date	Competition	Rnd	Vrs	H/A	Venue	Result	Score	Tries	Goals	Att
21 February 2003	Super League VIII	1	St. Helens	A	Knowsley Road	L	22–46	L.Pryce (2), Radford	Deacon 5/5	12,217
9 March 2003	Super League VIII	2	Wakefield Trinity Wildcats	H	Odsal Stadium	W	22–10	Gilmour, Hape, Pratt, L.Pryce	Radford 3/4	20,283
23 March 2003	Super League VIII	3	Halifax RLFC	H	Odsal Stadium	W	62–22	Lowes (3), Paul (3), Deacon, Hape, Pratt, L.Pryce, Reardon	Deacon 7/9, Lowes 2/2	15,557
30 March 2003	Super League VIII	4	Widnes Vikings	A	Halton Stadium	W	26–18	Anderson, Naylor, Paul, Withers	Deacon 5/5	6,320
6 April 2003	Super League VIII	5	Warrington Wolves	H	Odsal Stadium	W	32–8	Deacon, Lowes, L.Pryce, Vaikona, Vainikolo, Withers	Deacon 4/6	15,540
18 April 2003	Super League VIII	6	Hull F.C.	H	Odsal Stadium	W	48–24	Pratt (2), L.Pryce (2), Hape, Lowes, Vaikona, Vainikolo	Deacon 8/8	15,182
2 May 2003	Super League VIII	8	Wigan Warriors	A	JJB Stadium	W	14–8	L.Pryce (2), Vainikolo	Deacon 1/3	10,281
11 May 2003	Super League VIII	9	Castleford Tigers	H	Odsal Stadium	W	30–10	Vaikona (2), Deacon, Vagana	Deacon 7/7	14,749
18 May 2003	Super League VIII	10	Huddersfield Giants	A	McAlpine Stadium	W	52–6	Paul (3), Vaikona (2), Naylor, Peacock, Pratt, Vainikolo	Deacon 3/4, Radford 5/5	8,297
23 May 2003	Super League VIII	11	Leeds Rhinos	H	Odsal Stadium	W	48–22	Vaikona (2), Vainikolo (2), Anderson, Gartner, Paul, Pratt	Deacon 8/8	21,784
1 June 2003	Super League VIII	12	London Broncos	H	Odsal Stadium	L	12–22	Naylor, Parker	Deacon 2/2	10,835
8 June 2003	Super League VIII	13	Hull F.C.	A	KC Stadium	W	26–20	Hape, Pratt, Vainikolo	Deacon 7/7	19,549
15 June 2003	Super League VIII	14	Warrington Wolves	A	Wilderspool	W	24–20	Forshaw, Gartner, Naylor, Paul	Deacon 4/4	7,507
21 June 2003	Super League VIII	15	Wigan Warriors	H	Odsal Stadium	L	22–35	Deacon, Gartner, Paul, Vagana	Deacon 3/4	15,732
27 June 2003	Super League VIII	16	St. Helens	H	Odsal Stadium	L	0–35	–	–	11,127
6 July 2003	Super League VIII	17	Wakefield Trinity Wildcats	A	Belle Vue	W	30–18	Hape (2), Gartner, Lowes, Vagana, Vaikona	Deacon 3/6	4,658
11 July 2003	Super League VIII	18	Halifax RLFC	A	The Shay	W	60–12	Gartner (2), Parker (2), Vainikolo (2), Anderson, Deacon, Hape, Naylor, Radford	Deacon 8/11	4,555
20 July 2003	Super League VIII	19	Widnes Vikings	H	Odsal Stadium	W	40–8	Radford (2), Vainikolo (2), Hape, Reardon, Vaikona	Deacon 6/7	12,116
27 July 2003	Super League VIII	20	Castleford Tigers	A	The Jungle	W	40–20	Deacon, Gartner, Gilmour, Naylor, L.Pryce, Radford, Vaikona	Deacon 6/7	9,081
30 July 2003	Super League VIII	7	London Broncos	A	Griffin Park	W	60–6	L.Pryce (4), Vainikolo (2), Anderson, Langley, Lowes, Naylor, Vaikona	Deacon 8/11	3,651
3 August 2003	Super League VIII	21	Huddersfield Giants	H	Odsal Stadium	W	30–16	Deacon (2), Radford, Reardon, Vainikolo	Deacon 5/5	11,368
8 August 2003	Super League VIII	22	Leeds Rhinos	A	Headingley Stadium	W	18–16	Forshaw, Parker, Vainikolo	Deacon 3/3	23,035
16 August 2003	Super League VIII	23	Hull F.C.	H	Odsal Stadium	W	36–22	Vainikolo (3), Gilmour (2), Anderson, Langley	Radford 4/7	10,478
25 August 2003	Super League VIII	24	Wigan Warriors	A	JJB Stadium	L	12–26	Vagana, Vaikona	Deacon 2/2	14,714
31 August 2003	Super League VIII	25	London Broncos	A	Griffin Park	W	54–12	Peacock (2), Vaikona (2), Hape, Lowes, Parker, Radford, Vagana	Deacon 9/9	3,510
7 September 2003	Super League VIII	26	Leeds Rhinos	H	Odsal Stadium	W	22–21	Deacon, Reardon, Vainikolo	Deacon 4/4, Deacon 2 DG	21,102
14 September 2003	Super League VIII	27	Castleford Tigers	H	Odsal Stadium	L	14–28	Hape, L.Pryce	Deacon 3/3	13,628
19 September 2003	Super League VIII	28	St. Helens	A	Knowsley Road	W	22–18	Hape, L.Pryce, Vaikona, Vainikolo	Deacon 3/4	8,432

== Challenge Cup ==
LEGEND
Win
Draw
Loss

Date	Competition	Rnd	Vrs	H/A	Venue	Result	Score	Tries	Goals	Att
8 February 2003	Cup	4th	Warrington Wolves	A	Wilderspool	W	38–12	Vainikolo (2), Hape, Naylor, Paul, L.Pryce	Deacon 7/7	5,869
2 March 2003	Cup	5th	Hunslet Hawks	A	South Leeds Stadium	W	82–0	Vainikolo (3), Pratt (2), L.Pryce (2), Vaikona (2), Fielden, Gartner, Gilmour, Hape, Parker, Radford	Deacon 11/15	5,685
15 March 2003	Cup	QF	Widnes Vikings	A	Halton Stadium	W	38–28	Forshaw (2), Hape, Naylor, Paul, L.Pryce	Deacon 7/7	4,219
13 April 2003	Cup	SF	Wigan Warriors	N	McAlpine Stadium	W	36–22	Radford (2), Deacon, Hape, Lowes, Vaikona	Deacon 6/6	15,359
26 April 2003	Cup	Final	Leeds Rhinos	N	Millennium Stadium	W	22–20	Paul, Peacock, Vaikona	Deacon 5/5	71,212

== Playoffs ==
LEGEND
Win
Draw
Loss

Date	Competition	Rnd	Vrs	H/A	Venue	Result	Score	Tries	Goals	Att
4 October 2003	Play-offs	QSF	Leeds Rhinos	H	Odsal Stadium	W	30–14	Forshaw (2), L.Pryce, Vainikolo	Deacon 7/7	19,786
18 October 2003	Play-offs	GF	Wigan Warriors	N	Old Trafford	W	25–12	Hape, Lowes, Reardon	Deacon 6/6, Deacon 1 DG	65,537

== 2003 squad statistics ==
- Appearances and Points include (Super League, Challenge Cup and Play-offs) as of 2012.

No	Player	Position	Tries	Goals	DG	Points
1	Robbie Paul	Fullback	13	0	0	52
2	Tevita Vaikona	Wing	20	0	0	80
3	Leon Pryce	Centre	21	0	0	84
4	Shontayne Hape	Centre	16	0	0	64
5	Lesley Vainikolo	Wing	26	0	0	104
6	Michael Withers	Fullback	2	0	0	8
7	Paul Deacon	Scrum-half	10	173	3	389
8	Joe Vagana	Prop	5	0	0	20
9	James Lowes	Hooker	10	2	0	44
10	Paul Anderson	Prop	5	0	0	20
11	Daniel Gartner	Second Row	8	0	0	32
12	Jamie Peacock	Second Row	4	0	0	16
13	Mike Forshaw	Loose forward	6	0	0	24
14	Lee Gilmour	Centre	5	0	0	20
15	Karl Pratt	Stand Off	9	0	0	36
16	Alex Wilkinson	Wing	0	0	0	0
17	Stuart Reardon	Fullback	5	0	0	20
18	Lee Radford	Prop	10	12	0	64
19	Jamie Langley	Loose forward	2	0	0	8
20	Scott Naylor	Centre	9	0	0	36
22	Karl Pryce	Wing	0	0	0	0
23	Vinny Myler	Prop	0	0	0	0
26	Chris Bridge	Centre	0	0	0	0
27	Rob Parker	Prop	6	0	0	24
29	Stuart Fielden	Prop	1	0	0	4
30	Richard Moore	Wing	0	0	0	0
