= 2003 Challenge Cup =

Rugby league tournament held in 2003

2003 Powergen Challenge Cup
- Duration: 9 Rounds
- Highest attendance: 71,212
- Broadcast partners: (United Kingdom) BBC Sport
- Winners: Bradford Bulls
- Runners-up: Leeds Rhinos
- Lance Todd Trophy: Gary Connolly

The 2003 Challenge Cup was sponsored by Powergen and was held during the 2002–03 season. The final was held on Saturday 26 April 2003, at Millennium Stadium, Cardiff, Wales. The game was won by Bradford Bulls who defeated Leeds Rhinos.

== First round ==
Date	Team one	Team two	Score
30 Nov	Askam	Ideal Isberg	2-12
30 Nov	Bradford Dudley	Syngenta	12-4
30 Nov	British Army	Hunslet Warriors	10-22
30 Nov	Castleford Panthers	Walney	4-11
30 Nov	Cott. Phoenix	Navy	34-2
30 Nov	Dublin Exiles	Birkenshaw	0-56
30 Nov	East Hull	Normanton	36-4
30 Nov	Eastmoor	Wigan St Judes	18-26
30 Nov	Edinburgh	Oulton	8-26
30 Nov	Elland	Sharlston Rovers	12-8
30 Nov	Featherstone Lions	Ince Rose Bridge	16-8
30 Nov	Hensingham	Simms Cross	4-9
30 Nov	Heworth	Thornhill	4-24
30 Nov	Leigh East	Eccles	46-4
30 Nov	Leigh Miners R.	West Hull	20-6
30 Nov	Milford	Widnes St Maries	16-8
30 Nov	Millom	Embassy	20-26
30 Nov	Redhill	York Acorn	24-12
30 Nov	RAF	Crosfields	2-5
30 Nov	Sheffield Hills	Skirlaugh	8-24
30 Nov	Siddal	Leeds Met University	78-0
30 Nov	Thatto Heath	Cas. Lock Lane	12-19
30 Nov	Waterhead	Hull Dockers	16-12
30 Nov	Wath Brow Hornets	East Leeds	12-0
30 Nov	West Bowling	Rochdale Mayfield	28-0
30 Nov	Wigan St Pats	Oldham St Annes	17-20
30 Nov	Woolston	Saddleworth	20-10
30 Nov	Shaw Cross	Cardiff Demons	56-12

== Second round ==
Date	Team one	Team two	Score
14 Dec	Birkenshaw	West Bowling	0-14
14 Dec	Cas. Lock Lane	Thornhill	8-18
14 Dec	Cott. Phoenix	Bradford Dudley	17-4
14 Dec	East Hull	Coventry Bears	48-8
14 Dec	Elland	Redhill	4-13
14 Dec	Featherstone Lions	Oldham St Annes	10-12
14 Dec	Hunslet Warriors	Woolston	18-30
14 Dec	Leigh East	Skirlaugh	20-28
14 Dec	Leigh Miners R.	Crosfields	68-8
14 Dec	Siddal	Ideal Isberg	14-0
14 Dec	Walney	Simms Cross	2-12
14 Dec	Waterhead	Shaw Cross	4-18
14 Dec	Wath Brow Hornets	Milford	66-6
14 Dec	Wigan St Judes	Oulton	16-24
15 Dec	Embassy	Strela Kazan	20-16

== Third round ==
Date	Team one	Team two	Score
24 Jan	Chorley Lynx	Leigh Miners R.	36-14
24 Jan	Oulton	Sheffield Eagles	8-22
24 Jan	Wath Brow Hornets	Workington Town	13-12
25 Jan	Leigh	Locomotiv	62-0
26 Jan	Barrow	Embassy	70-6
26 Jan	Doncaster	Redhill	64-2
26 Jan	Featherstone Rovers	Villeneuve	26-22
26 Jan	Gateshead	UTC	4-38
26 Jan	Hull Kingston Rovers	Siddal	28-0
26 Jan	Hunslet Hawks	Pia	28-18
26 Jan	Keighley	Thornhill	33-10
26 Jan	Oldham St Annes	Rochdale Hornets	18-62
26 Jan	Oldham	East Hull	32-6
26 Jan	Salford City	Toulouse	26-10
26 Jan	Simms Cross	London Skolars	15-8
26 Jan	Skirlaugh	York City Knights	8-20
26 Jan	Swinton	Shaw Cross	46-0
26 Jan	West Bowling	Batley	12-34
26 Jan	Whitehaven	Cott. Phoenix	66-6
26 Jan	Woolston	Dewsbury	12-34

== Fourth round ==
Date	Team one	Team two	Score
8 Feb	UTC	St Helens	6-70
8 Feb	Wakefield Trinity	Castleford Tigers	20-18
8 Feb	Warrington	Bradford	12-38
8 Feb	Wath Brow Hornets	Batley	6-18
9 Feb	Barrow	Salford City	6-22
9 Feb	Featherstone Rovers	Leigh	28-22
9 Feb	Hull FC	Halifax	24-16
9 Feb	Hunslet Hawks	Huddersfield	18-14
9 Feb	Chorley Lynx	Swinton	16-32
9 Feb	Leeds	Whitehaven	46-6
9 Feb	London	Oldham	42-12
9 Feb	Rochdale Hornets	Hull Kingston Rovers	20-27
9 Feb	Sheffield Eagles	Keighley	25-24
9 Feb	Widnes	Dewsbury	48-6
9 Feb	Wigan	Simms Cross	82-3
9 Feb	York City Knights	Doncaster	20-21

== Fifth round ==
Date	Team one	Team two	Score
28 Feb	St Helens	Batley Bulldogs	38-12
28 Feb	Wakefield Trinity Wildcats	Widnes Vikings	12-22
1 Mar	Swinton Lions	Featherstone Rovers	32-10
2 Mar	Leeds Rhinos	London Broncos	21-12
2 Mar	Hunslet Hawks	Bradford Bulls	0-82
2 Mar	Doncaster Dragons	Wigan Warriors	10-50
2 Mar	Sheffield Eagles	Hull F.C.	0-88
2 Mar	Hull Kingston Rovers	Salford City Reds	2-12

== Quarter-finals ==
Date	Team one	Team two	Score
15 Mar	Widnes Vikings	Bradford Bulls	28-38
16 Mar	Swinton Lions	Wigan Warriors	12-70
16 Mar	Leeds Rhinos	Hull F.C.	41-18
16 Mar	Salford City Reds	St Helens	6-54

== Semi-finals ==
Date	Team one	Team two	Score
12 Apr	Leeds Rhinos	St Helens	33-26
13 Apr	Wigan Warriors	Bradford Bulls	22-36

== Final ==
2003 Powerglen Challenge Cup Final

26 April 2003
14:30 BST (UTC+1)

Bradford Bulls	22 – 20	Leeds Rhinos
Tries: 3 Paul 5'; Vainikolo 38'; Peacock 42'; Goals: 5 Deacon (3/3) + 2 pen.	1st: 14 – 14; 2nd: 8 – 6 Report	Tries: 3 Connolly 9'; McKenna 21'; Furner 59'; Goals: 4 Sinfield (3/3) + 1 pen.

Millennium Stadium, Cardiff
Attendance: 71,212
Referee: Russell Smith (Castleford)
Lance Todd Trophy: Gary Connolly (Leeds Rhinos)

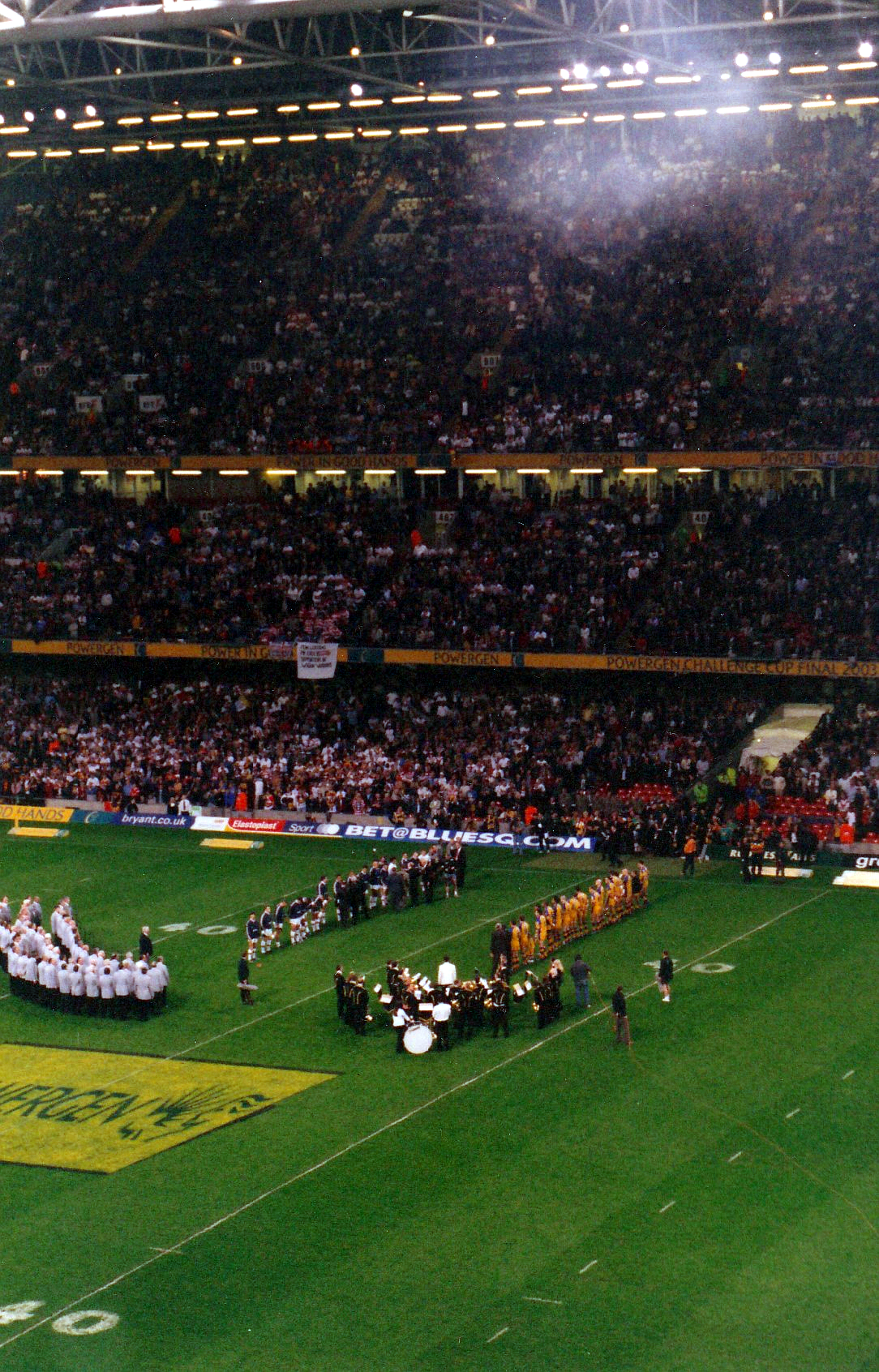
Bradford and Leeds lining up against each other in the Final at the Millennium Stadium

Team details
Bradford Bulls		Position	Leeds Rhinos
Name	Number	Position	Number	Name
Robbie Paul (c) 5'	1	Fullback	18	Gary Connolly 9'
Tevita Vaikona 38'	2	Wing	2	Mark Calderwood
Scott Naylor	20	Centre	3	Chris McKenna 21'
Shontayne Hape	4	Centre	4	Keith Senior
Lesley Vainikolo	5	Wing	1	Francis Cummins
Leon Pryce	3	Stand off	13	Kevin Sinfield (c)
Paul Deacon	7	Scrum half	14	Andrew Dunemann
Joe Vagana (substituted off) 20'	8	Prop forward	19	Ryan Bailey (substituted off) 18'
James Lowes	9	Hooker	9	Matt Diskin (substituted off) 32' (substituted on) 37'
Daniel Gartner (substituted off) 30'	11	Prop forward	10	Barrie McDermott (substituted off) 18' (substituted on) 58'
Lee Radford (substituted off) 30'	18	Second row	5	Chev Walker
Jamie Peacock 42'	12	Second row	12	Matt Adamson
Mike Forshaw	13	Loose forward	11	David Furner 59'
Karl Pratt	15	Interchange	7	Rob Burrow (substituted on) 32' (substituted off) 37'
Lee Gilmour (substituted on) 30'	14	Interchange	16	Willie Poching (substituted off) 58'
Rob Parker (substituted on) 30'	27	Interchange	8	Danny Ward (substituted on) 18'
Paul Anderson (substituted on) 20'	10	Interchange	17	Wayne McDonald (substituted on) 18'
(England) Brian Noble		Coach		(England) Daryl Powell
Sources: Rugby League Project, BBC TV

=== Half time entertainment ===
Mis-Teeq performed at half time.

== Television coverage ==
BBC Sport had live rights to the tournament in the United Kingdom from the fourth round onwards.

The matches shown live on the BBC were: Wakefield Trinity Wildcats 20–18 Castleford Tigers and Warrington Wolves 12-38 Bradford Bulls (R4); Leeds Rhinos 21–12 London Broncos and Wakefield Trinity Wildcats 12–22 Widnes Vikings (R5); Widnes Vikings 28–38 Bradford Bulls and Leeds Rhinos 41–18 Hull (QF); Leeds Rhinos 33–26 St Helens and Wigan Warriors 22–36 Bradford Bulls (SF); and Bradford Bulls 22–20 Leeds Rhinos (Final).
