= 2005 Super League Grand Final =

British rugby league championship match

Leeds Rhinos	Bradford Bulls
6	15
	1	2	Total
LEE	6	0	6
BRA	8	7	15
- Date: 15 October 2005
- Stadium: Old Trafford
- Location: (England) Manchester
- Harry Sunderland Trophy: (England) Leon Pryce ( Bradford Bulls)
- Headliners: Madness
- Referee: Ashley Klein
- Attendance: 65,728

Broadcast partners
- Broadcasters: Sky Sports
- Commentators: Eddie Hemmings; Mike Stephenson

The 2005 Super League Grand Final was the eighth official grand final and the conclusive and championship-deciding match of the Super League X season. Held on Saturday 15 October 2005, at Old Trafford, Manchester, the game was played between Bradford Bulls, who finished 3rd in the league after the 28 weekly rounds, and Leeds Rhinos, who finished second after the weekly rounds.

== Route to final ==
	Team	Pld	W	D	L	PF	PA	PD	Pts
2	Leeds Rhinos	28	22	0	6	1150	505	+645	44
3	Bradford Bulls	28	18	1	9	1038	684	+354	37

=== Route to the Final ===
==== Leeds Rhinos ====
Round	Opposition	Score
Qualifying Semi-Final	St Helens (H)	16–19
Key: (H) = Home venue; (A) = Away venue; (N) = Neutral venue.

==== Bradford Bulls ====
Round	Opposition	Score
Elimination Play-off	London Broncos (H)	44–22
Elimination Semi-Final	Hull F.C. (H)	71–0
Elimination Final	St Helens (A)	23–18
Key: (H) = Home venue; (A) = Away venue; (N) = Neutral venue.

== Match details ==
15 October 2005
18:00 UTC+1

Leeds Rhinos	6 - 15	Bradford Bulls
Tries: Danny McGuire; Goals: Kevin Sinfield	Report	Tries: Leon Pryce; Lesley Vainikolo; Goals: Paul Deacon (3); Drop Goals: Iestyn Harris

Old Trafford, Manchester
Attendance: 65,728
Referee: Ashley Klein (Australia)

Leeds Rhinos		Position	Bradford Bulls	
1	(England) Richard Mathers	Fullback	6	(Ireland) Michael Withers
2	(England) Mark Calderwood	Winger	3	(England) Leon Pryce
3	(England) Chev Walker	Centre	13	(Australia) Ben Harris
12	(Australia) Chris McKenna	Centre	4	(New Zealand) Shontayne Hape
5	(Papua New Guinea) Marcus Bai	Winger	5	(Tonga) Lesley Vainikolo
6	(England) Danny McGuire	Stand Off	18	(Wales) Iestyn Harris
7	(England) Rob Burrow	Scrum half	7	(England) Paul Deacon
8	(England) Ryan Bailey	Prop	12	(England) Jamie Peacock (c)
14	(Australia) Andrew Dunemann	Hooker	9	(Scotland) Ian Henderson
15	(England) Danny Ward	Prop	29	(England) Stuart Fielden
20	(England) Gareth Ellis	2nd Row	16	(England) Paul Johnson
16	(New Zealand) Willie Poching	2nd Row	10	(Australia) Brad Meyers
13	(England) Kevin Sinfield (c)	Loose forward	11	(England) Lee Radford
9	(England) Matt Diskin	Interchange	1	(New Zealand) Robbie Paul
11	(New Zealand) Ali Lauitiiti	Interchange	19	(England) Jamie Langley
18	(England) Jamie Jones-Buchanan	Interchange	24	(England) Adrian Morley
10	(Ireland) Barrie McDermott	Interchange	8	(New Zealand) Joe Vagana
	(Australia) Tony Smith	Coach		(England) Brian Noble

== See also ==
- 2005 Bradford Bulls season
- 2006 World Club Challenge
