= 2004 Super League Grand Final =

British rugby league championship match

Leeds Rhinos	Bradford Bulls
16	8
	1	2	Total
LEE	10	6	16
BRA	4	4	8
- Date: 16 October 2004
- Stadium: Old Trafford
- Location: (England) Manchester
- Harry Sunderland Trophy: (England) Matt Diskin ( Leeds Rhinos)
- Headliners: Heather Small
- Referee: Steve Ganson
- Attendance: 65,547

Broadcast partners
- Broadcasters: Sky Sports
- Commentators: Eddie Hemmings; Mike Stephenson

The 2004 Super League Grand Final was the seventh official grand final and conclusive and championship-deciding game of Super League IX. It was held on Saturday 16 October 2004, at Old Trafford, Manchester, and was played between Leeds Rhinos, who finished top of the league after the 28 weekly rounds, and Bradford Bulls, who finished second after the weekly rounds.

== Background ==
	Team	Pld	W	D	L	PF	PA	PD	Pts
1	Leeds Rhinos	28	24	2	2	1037	443	+594	50
2	Bradford Bulls	28	20	1	7	918	565	+353	41

=== Route to the Final ===
==== Leeds Rhinos ====
Leeds finished top of the table to qualify for a home match in the semi-finals. The play-off structure matched them against the team finishing second - Bradford. Bradford won the semi-final meaning Leeds had to win the elimination final against Wigan to qualify for the grand final. In the elimination final they raced past Wigan 40–12 to set up a rematch against Bradford.

Leeds
Round	Opposition	Score
Qualifying Semi-Final	Bradford Bulls (H)	26-12
Elimination Final	Wigan Warriors (H)	40-12
Key: (H) = Home venue; (A) = Away venue.

==== Bradford Bulls ====
By finishing second in the table Bradford qualified for the semi-finals but had to play the league leaders, Leeds, away with the winners going straight through to the grand final. In the game at Headingley Bradford won 26–12.

== Match details ==
16 October 2004

Leeds Rhinos	16 - 8	Bradford Bulls
Tries: Diskin; McGuire; Goals: Sinfield (4)	Report	Tries: Vainikolo; Hape

Old Trafford, Manchester
Attendance: 65,547
Referee: Steve Ganson (St Helens)

Bradford's Leon Pryce was unable to play due to a shoulder injury, he was replaced by Paul Johnson.

Andrew Dunemann was left out of the Leeds side. Danny McGuire was partnered by Kevin Sinfield in the halves. The pre-match entertainment was performed by singer Heather Small

Leeds Rhinos		Position	Bradford Bulls	
21	(England) Richard Mathers	Fullback	6	(Ireland) Michael Withers
18	(England) Mark Calderwood	Winger	17	(England) Stuart Reardon
5	(England) Chev Walker	Centre	16	(England) Paul Johnson
4	(England) Keith Senior	Centre	4	(New Zealand) Shontayne Hape
22	(Papua New Guinea) Marcus Bai	Winger	5	(Tonga) Lesley Vainikolo
13	(England) Kevin Sinfield	Stand Off	18	(Wales) Iestyn Harris
6	(England) Danny McGuire	Scrum half	7	(England) Paul Deacon
19	(England) Danny Ward	Prop	8	(New Zealand) | Joe Vagana
9	(England) Matt Diskin	Hooker	1	(New Zealand) Robbie Paul
8	(England) Ryan Bailey	Prop	29	(England) Stuart Fielden
3	(Australia) Chris McKenna	2nd Row	12	(England) Jamie Peacock
29	(New Zealand) Ali Lauitiiti	2nd Row	13	(Australia) Logan Swann
11	(Australia) David Furner	Loose forward	11	(Australia) Lee Radford
7	(England) Rob Burrow	Interchange	15	(England) Karl Pratt
16	(Australia) Willie Poching	Interchange	19	(England) Jamie Langley
10	(Ireland) Barrie McDermott	Interchange	27	(England) Rob Parker
20	(England) Jamie Jones-Buchanan	Interchange	10	(England) Paul Anderson
	(Australia) Tony Smith	Coach		(England) Brian Noble

== See also ==
- Super League IX
