= Willie Poching =

Former NZ & Samoa international rugby league footballer

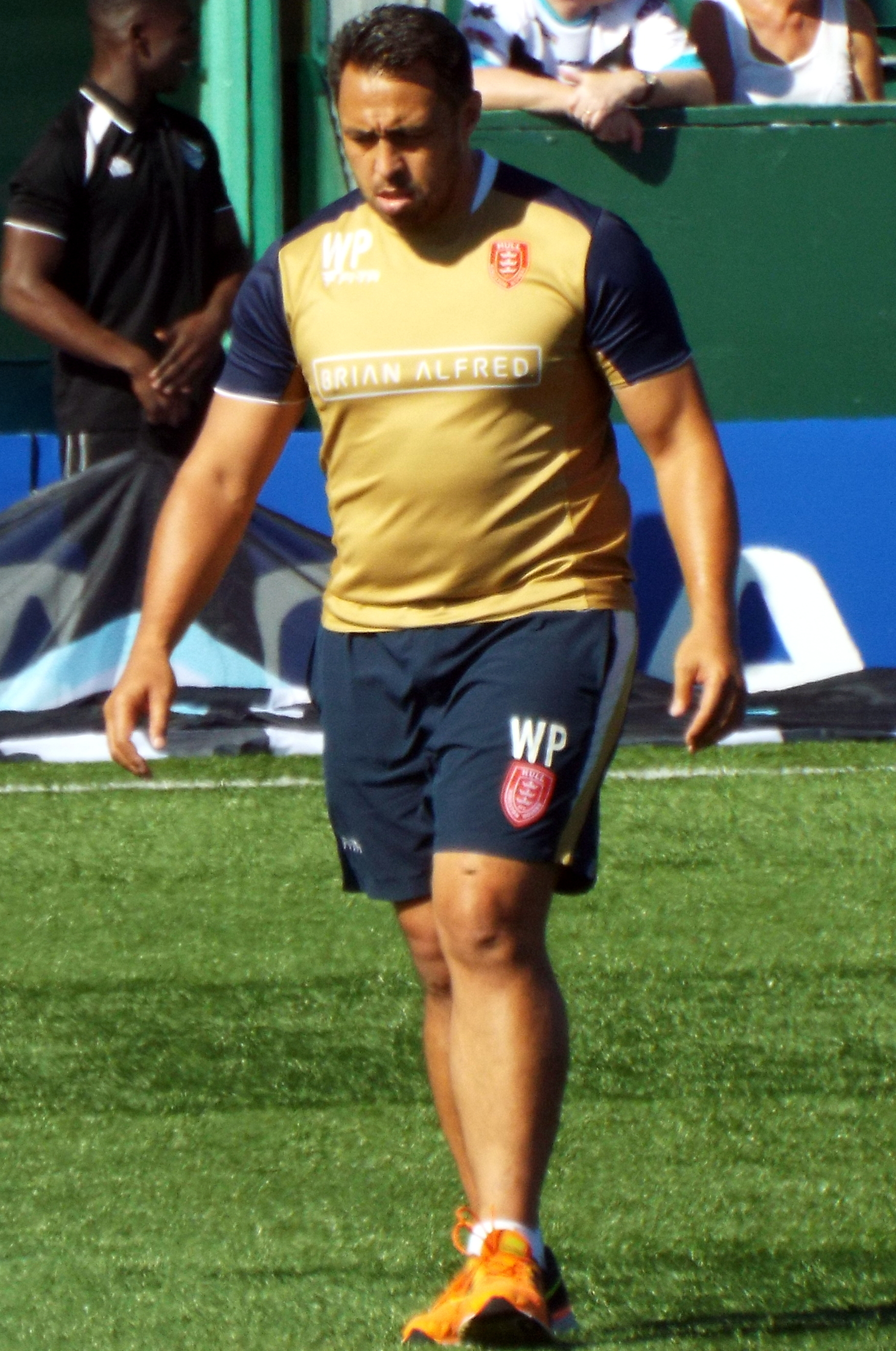

Personal information
- Full name: William Mila Poching
- Born: 30 August 1973 (age 53) Auckland, New Zealand
- Height: 6 ft 0 in (1.82 m)
- Weight: 16 st 3 lb (103 kg)

Playing information
- Position: Second-row
Club
Years	Team	Pld	T	G	FG	P
	Marist Saints
	Mount Albert Lions
1993	Northcote Tigers
1995	Auckland Warriors	2	1	0	0	4
1996	North Qld Cowboys	16	0	2	0	4
1997	Hunter Mariners	13	3	1	0	14
1998	St. George Dragons	4	1	0	0	4
1998	Hunslet Hawks	2	0	0	0	0
1999–01	Wakefield Trinity Wildcats	74	21	1	0	86
2002–06	Leeds Rhinos	149	51	0	0	204
	Total	260	77	4	0	316
Representative
Years	Team	Pld	T	G	FG	P
1992–93	Auckland	4
1994–00	Samoa	6	0	2	0	4
2005	New Zealand	1	0	0	0	0

Coaching information
Club
Years	Team	Gms	W	D	L	W%
2021–22	Wakefield Trinity	36	17	0	19	47
Representative
Years	Team	Gms	W	D	L	W%
2009	Samoa	1	0	0	1	0
- Source: As of 13 September 2022

Willie Poching is a professional rugby league football coach and former rugby league footballer. He is the former head-coach of Wakefield Trinity in the Super League. When he was appointed head coach of Wakefield, he became the first Samoan head coach of a first grade rugby league club. A former New Zealand, and Samoa international representative forward, he spent his career playing for clubs in New Zealand, Australia and finally England, winning the Super League championship with Leeds Rhinos in 2004.

== Playing career ==
=== New Zealand ===
Poching played for the Northcote Tigers, Marist Saints and Mount Albert Lions in the Auckland Rugby League competition. He made the Junior Kiwis in 1991 and captained the side in 1992. He played in 4 games for Auckland between 1992 and 1993, before signing a junior contract with the Brisbane Broncos for 1994. During that year he toured New Zealand with Western Samoa and captained them in a game against a Manawatu XIII. Poching represented the Junior Kiwis in 1991 and 1992, captaining the side in 1992.

He joined the Auckland Warriors in 1995, however he only played two games for the club and was not re-signed for the 1996 season. Poching played for Western Samoa at the 1995 World Cup, and also captained Samoa during their 2000 World Cup.

=== England ===
Over his long career Poching played for Wakefield Trinity (captain) and was a huge crowd favourite and club captain for his final season. He then joined the Leeds club in the Super League. Poching played for the Leeds side from the interchange bench in their 2004 Super League Grand Final victory against the Bradford club. As Super League IX champions, the Leeds club faced 2004 NRL season premiers, the Canterbury-Bankstown Bulldogs in the 2005 World Club Challenge. Poching played from the interchange bench, scoring a try in Leeds 39-32 victory. Poching played for Leeds side in the 2005 Challenge Cup Final from the interchange bench in their loss against Hull FC. He played for Leeds at second-row in their 2005 Super League Grand Final loss against Bradford. He played his single game for New Zealand against England at Halliwell Jones Stadium, Warrington during the 2005 Tri-Nations campaign. Poching was forced to retire due to injury at the completion of 2006 season.

== Coaching career ==
Poching was the academy coach at Leeds as well as the head coach of Samoa. He moved from Leeds to become assistant coach to Tony Smith at the Warrington club in the 2010 post season, and coached the team to win the League Leader's Shield in 2011, Challenge Cup in 2012, and to two Grand Final defeats in 2012 (to Leeds) and 2013 (to Wigan). Poching signed as assistant coach at the Salford side for the 2017 season. He later re-joined Hull Kingston Rovers and Tony Smith as assistant coach before returning to Wakefield Trinity as an interim head coach. Poching was named head coach on 22 September 2021 after a successful interim stint. On 12 September 2022, Poching announced he was departing Wakefield Trinity. The club finished 10th on the table and narrowly avoided relegation to the RFL Championship.

== Personal life ==
Poching father Eddie was the first manager of the Samoa national rugby league team.

Poching gave son Kobe Poching, his Super League debut in the Boxing Day 2021 clash between Wakefield and Leeds.
