= Matt Diskin =

English rugby league coach and former Great Britain and England international

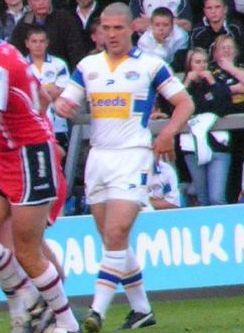

Personal information
- Full name: Matthew Diskin
- Born: 27 January 1982 (age 43) Dewsbury, West Yorkshire, England

Playing information
- Height: 5 ft 11 in (1.80 m)
- Weight: 15 st 4 lb (97 kg)
- Position: Hooker
Club
| Years | Team | Pld | T | G | FG | P |
|---|---|---|---|---|---|---|
| 2001–10 | Leeds Rhinos | 264 | 44 | 0 | 0 | 176 |
| 2011–14 | Bradford Bulls | 86 | 13 | 0 | 0 | 52 |
| | Total | 350 | 57 | 0 | 0 | 228 |
Representative
| Years | Team | Pld | T | G | FG | P |
| 2004 | Great Britain | 1 | 0 | 0 | 0 | 0 |
| 2006 | England | 3 | 0 | 0 | 0 | 0 |
| 2002–03 | Yorkshire | 3 | 3 | 0 | 0 | 12 |

Coaching information
Club
| Years | Team | Gms | W | D | L | W% |
| 2014 | Bradford Bulls | 3 | 1 | 0 | 2 | 33 |
| 2017–19 | Batley Bulldogs | 43 | 21 | 1 | 20 | 49 |
| 2020–21 | Oldham | 19 | 4 | 0 | 15 | 21 |
| | Total | 65 | 26 | 1 | 37 | 40 |

Matt Diskin (born 27 January 1982) an English professional rugby league coach was the head coach of Oldham in the Championship, and a former professional rugby league footballer who played as a hooker in the 2000s and 2010s.

He played at representative level for Great Britain, England and Yorkshire, and at club level for Leeds and Bradford and coached at club level for the Bradford and Batley. Diskin played for the Leeds Rhinos for 10-years, and won four Super League championships with the club in 2004 (Super League IX), 2007 (Super League XII), 2008 (Super League XIII), and 2009 (Super League XIV), before moving to Bradford for the 2011 season, he remained with the Bradford club until the end of his playing career in 2014. He then became head coach of the Batley in the Championship.

== Background ==
Diskin was born in Dewsbury, West Yorkshire, England.

== Playing career ==
Diskin is a product of amateur rugby league club Dewsbury Moor ARLFC and growing up he attended St. John Fisher High School in Dewsbury, as did Francis Cummins and Ryan Sheridan.

=== Leeds Rhinos ===
Diskin made his début first-team appearance for Leeds in 2001 against Castleford. He played for the Leeds at Hooker and scored a try in their 2004 Super League Grand Final victory against Bradford, and was man of the match. He was selected to represent Great Britain in the 2004 Tri-nations tournament.

Diskin played for Leeds in the 2005 Challenge Cup Final at Hooker in their loss against Hull FC. He played for Leeds from the interchange bench in their 2005 Super League Grand Final loss against Bradford. He played in the 2008 Super League Grand Final victory over St. Helens.

He played in the 2009 Super League Grand Final victory over St. Helens at Old Trafford, scoring a try in the record-breaking third consecutive Grand Final victory over St Helens.

2010 saw Diskin celebrate his testimonial year at Leeds after ten years of service to the most successful club of recent years. Diskin had been instrumental in all of Leeds' championship winning campaigns. He played in the 2010 Challenge Cup Final defeat by Warrington at Wembley Stadium.

On 19 October 2010, it was announced that Diskin had agreed a move to Bradford on a three-year contract, and was expected to push for the starting hooker position in the Bradford line-up.

=== Bradford Bulls ===
Diskin appeared in two of 2011's four pre-season games. He played against Dewsbury and Wakefield Trinity. Diskin featured in 23 consecutive games from Round 1 (Leeds) to Round 23 (Warrington). He also appeared in the Challenge Cup game against Wigan. He scored against Leeds, Crusaders and Harlequins RL. A shoulder injury kept him out for the rest of the season.

Diskin and Heath L'Estrange were appointed joint captains for the 2012 season. Diskin featured in two of the four pre-season games. He played against Dewsbury and Hull FC. Diskin featured in 15 consecutive games from Round 1 (Catalans Dragons) to Round 15 (Leeds). Diskin missed Rounds 16–23 due to injury. Diskin returned for Round 24 (Hull Kingston Rovers) to Round 27 (Catalans Dragons). He also featured in the Challenge Cup against Doncaster and Warrington. Diskin scored tries against Warrington (1 try), Hull Kingston Rovers (1 try), Doncaster (2 tries), Leeds (1 try) and Huddersfield (1 try).

Diskin featured in 2013's pre-season friendlies against Dewsbury and Leeds. He scored against Dewsbury (1 try). He featured in four consecutive games from Round 1 (Wakefield Trinity) to Round 4 (St. Helens). He missed Round 5 due to injury. He returned for Round 6 (Widnes) but was ill for Round 7. Diskin returned for Round 8 (Catalans Dragons) to Round 9 (Leeds). He missed Round 10 due to an injury. Diskin featured in Round 11 (London Broncos) to Round 16 (Huddersfield). He returned to the team for Round 18 (St. Helens) to Round 27 (Huddersfield). Diskin also appeared in the Challenge Cup against London Broncos. Matt scored against Widnes Vikings (1 try), Salford City Reds (1 try) and Hull F.C. (1 try). Diskin signed a one-year extension to his contract midway through the season.

Diskin missed the pre-season friendlies against Hull FC and Dewsbury due to injury. However he did feature in the friendly against Castleford. He featured in Round 1 (Castleford Tigers) to Round 6 (Hull Kingston Rovers). Diskin next featured in Round 8 (Salford Red Devils) then in Round 11 (Warrington) to Round 13 (Huddersfield). He also played in Round 15 (Wakefield Trinity Wildcats) to Round 19 (Catalans Dragons). Diskin featured in Round 5 (Catalans Dragons) to the quarter-final (Warrington) in the Challenge Cup. He scored against Hull F.C. (1 try).

== Coaching career ==
=== Bradford Bulls ===
Diskin was put in temporary charge of the Bradford outfit on 16 June 2014 as a player coach. It was the day following the sacking of head coach Francis Cummins, and assistant Lee St Hilaire. Diskin took charge of Bradford's home match against Hull Kingston Rovers where they lost 44–18 the Tuesday after James Lowes was announced as Bradford's new head coach.

At the end of the 2014 season, Diskin announced his retirement.

=== Batley Bulldogs ===
In April 2016 it was announced Diskin was to take over at Batley from 2017 after John Kear announced he would be joining Wakefield Trinity as director of rugby in 2017.

=== Oldham ===
On 10 October 2019 Diskin was appointed as Head Coach.

On 29 June 2021, Oldham sacked him after 9 defeats in the last 10 games with assistant-coach Brendan Sheridan taking over training.

== Stats ==
(For 2014 Super League season highlights, stats and results click on 2014 Super League season results)

| Season | Appearance | Tries | Goals | F/G | Points |
|---|---|---|---|---|---|
| 2011 Bradford Bulls | 24 | 3 | 0 | 0 | 12 |
| 2012 Bradford Bulls | 21 | 6 | 0 | 0 | 24 |
| 2013 Bradford Bulls | 24 | 3 | 0 | 0 | 12 |
| 2014 Bradford Bulls | 17 | 1 | 0 | 0 | 4 |
| Total | 86 | 13 | 0 | 0 | 52 |
