= 2004 World Club Challenge =

Rugby league competition

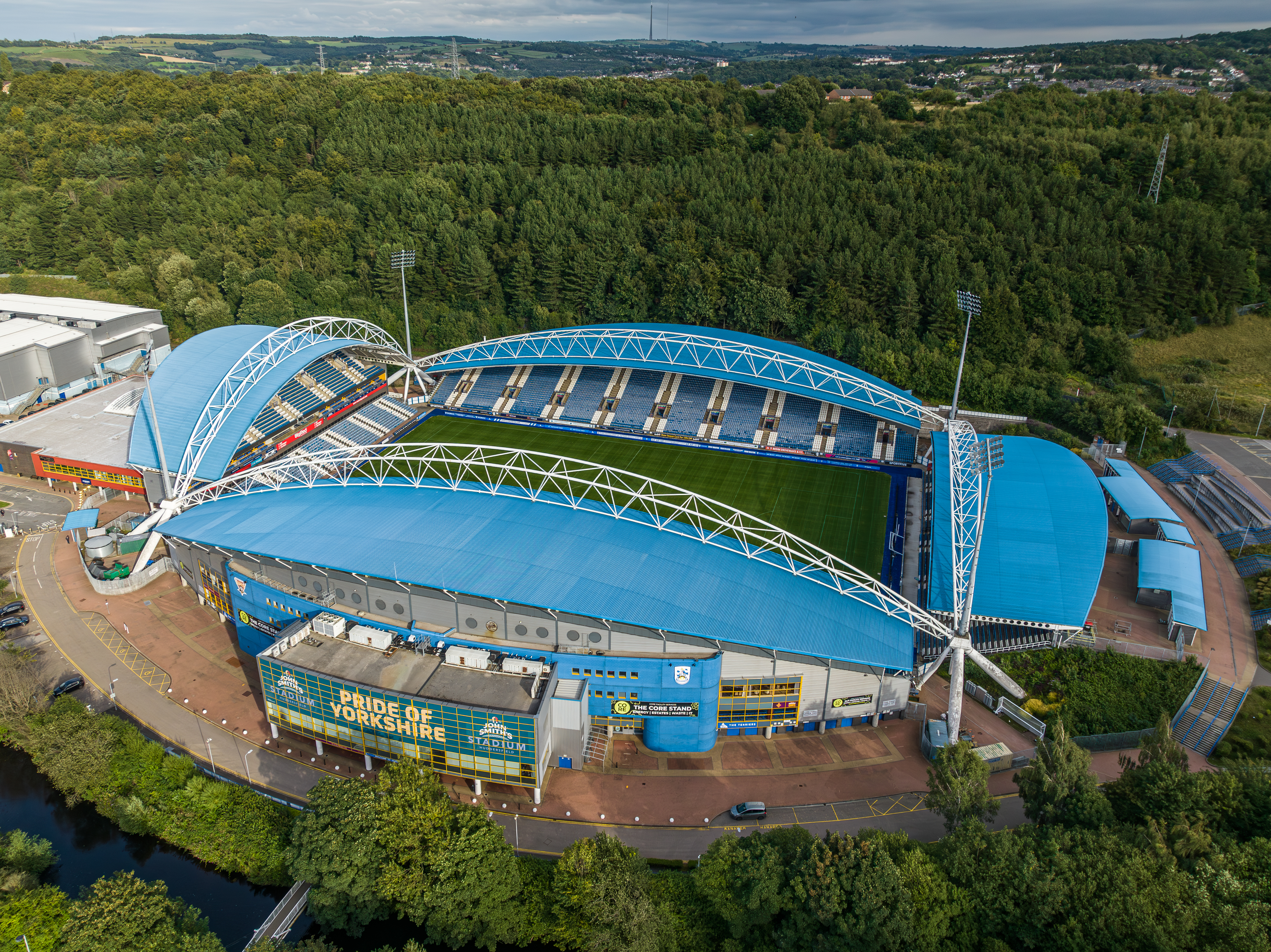
- The Kirklees Stadium hosted the match
Bradford Bulls	Penrith Panthers
(Super League)	(National Rugby League)
22	4
	1	2	Total
BRA	16	6	22
PEN	0	4	4
- Date: 13 February 2004
- Stadium: Kirklees Stadium
- Location: Huddersfield, England
- Man of the Match: Leon Pryce
- Referee: Steve Ganson
- Attendance: 18,962

Broadcast partners
- Broadcasters: (United Kingdom) Sky Sports
- Commentators: Eddie Hemmings; Mike Stephenson

The 2004 World Club Challenge was held on Friday, 13 February 2004, at the Alfred McAlpine Stadium, Huddersfield, England. The game was contested by Bradford Bulls and the Penrith Panthers.

== Match Summary ==
13 February 2004

Bradford Bulls	22 – 4	Penrith Panthers
Tries: Lesley Vainikolo; Leon Pryce; Robert Parker; Logan Swann; Goals: Michael Withers (3/5); Lee Radford (0/1)	(Report)	Tries: Luke Priddis Goals: Preston Campbell (0/1)

Alfred McAlpine Stadium, Huddersfield
Attendance: 18,962
Referee: Steve Ganson (England)
Player of the Match: Leon Pryce

== Teams ==
2004 World Club Challenge Teams
Bradford Bulls	Position	Penrith Panthers
6. Michael Withers	Fullback	1. Rhys Wesser
2. Tevita Vaikona	Winger	2. Brett Howland
16. Paul Johnson	Centre	3. Luke Lewis
4. Shontayne Hape	Centre	4. Paul Whatuira
5. Lesley Vainikolo	Winger	5. Luke Rooney
3. Leon Pryce	Stand Off / five-eighth	6. Preston Campbell
15. Karl Pratt	Scrum half / halfback	7. Craig Gower (c)
10. Paul Anderson	Prop	8. Joel Clinton
24. Aaron Smith	Hooker	9. Luke Priddis
29. Stuart Fielden	Prop	10. Martin Lang
11. Lee Radford	2nd Row	11. Joe Galuvao
12. Jamie Peacock (c)	2nd Row	12. Tony Puletua
13. Logan Swann	Loose forward / Lock	13. Trent Waterhouse
17. Stuart Reardon	Interchange	14. Ben Ross
8. Joe Vagana	Interchange	16. Colin Ward
27. Robert Parker	Interchange	15. Shane Rodney
18. Jamie Langley	Interchange	17. Luke Swain
Brian Noble	Coach	John Lang
