= 2003 Super League Grand Final =

British rugby league championship match

| Bradford Bulls | Wigan Warriors |
|---|---|
| 25 | 12 |
| | 1 | 2 | Total |
|---|---|---|---|
| BRA | 4 | 21 | 25 |
| WIG | 6 | 6 | 12 |
- Date: 18 October 2003
- Stadium: Old Trafford
- Location: (England) Manchester
- Harry Sunderland Trophy: (England) Stuart Reardon ( Bradford Bulls)
- Referee: Karl Kirkpatrick
- Attendance: 65,537

Broadcast partners
- Broadcasters: Sky Sports
- Commentators: Eddie Hemmings; Mike Stephenson

The 2003 Super League Grand Final was the sixth official grand final conclusive and premiership-deciding match of Super League VIII. Held on Saturday 18 October 2003 at Old Trafford, Manchester, the game was played between Bradford Bulls and Wigan Warriors. The match was refereed Karl Kirkpatrick and watched by a crowd of 65,537, with Bradford winning 25 - 12.

== Background ==
| | Team | Pld | W | D | L | PF | PA | PD | Pts |
|---|---|---|---|---|---|---|---|---|---|
| 1 | Bradford Bulls | 28 | 22 | 0 | 6 | 878 | 529 | +349 | 44 |
| 3 | Wigan Warriors | 28 | 19 | 2 | 7 | 751 | 555 | +196 | 41 |

=== Route to the Final ===
==== Bradford Bulls ====
Bradford finished top of the table so qualified straight to the play-off semi-final. They were drawn at home to Leeds Rhinos and won 30–14 to qualify for the grand final.

==== Wigan Warriors ====
Wigan finished third in the table so had to play their way through three rounds of play-off matches. In the elimination play-off they beat Warrington 25–12, the semi-final saw them beat St Helens 40–24 and then in the elimination final they beat Leeds Rhinos 23–22 to set up the final against Bradford.

Wigan
| Round | Opposition | Score |
|---|---|---|
| Elimination Play-off | Warrington Wolves (H) | 25-12 |
| Elimination Semi-Final | St Helens (H) | 40-24 |
| Elimination Final | Leeds Rhinos (H) | 23-22 |
Key: (H) = Home venue; (A) = Away venue.

== Match details ==
18 October 2003

| Bradford Bulls | 25 - 12 | Wigan Warriors |
|---|---|---|
| Tries: Stuart Reardon; Shontayne Hape; James Lowes; Goals: Paul Deacon (6); Drop Goals: Paul Deacon | | Tries: Danny Tickle; Kris Radlinski; Goals: Andy Farrell (2) |

Old Trafford, Manchester
Attendance: 65,537
Referee: Kark Kirkpatrick

| Bradford Bulls | | Position | Wigan Warriors | |
|---|---|---|---|---|
| | (England) Stuart Reardon | Fullback | 1 | (England) Kris Radlinski |
| 2 | (Tonga) Tevita Vaikona | Wing | 2 | (Ireland) Brian Carney |
| | (Ireland) Michael Withers | Centre | 3 | (England) Martin Aspinwall |
| | (New Zealand) Shontayne Hape | Centre | | (England) David Hodgson |
| 5 | (Tonga) Lesley Vainikolo | Wing | 5 | (Australia) Brett Dallas |
| | (England) Karl Pratt | Stad Off | | (England) Sean O'Loughlin |
| 7 | (England) Paul Deacon | Scrum half | 7 | (England) Luke Robinson |
| | (New Zealand) Joe Vagana | Prop | | (New Zealand) Quentin Pongia |
| 9 | (England) James Lowes | Fullback | 9 | (England) Terry Newton |
| 10 | (England) Stuart Fielden | Prop | | (England) Craig Smith |
| | (Australia) Daniel Gartner | Second Row | | (England) Mick Cassidy |
| 11 | (England) Jamie Peacock | Second Row | | (England) Danny Tickle |
| | (England) Mike Forshaw | Loose forward | 13 | (England) Andy Farrell |
| | (England) Leon Pryce | Interchange | | (England) Paul Johnson |
| 6 | (New Zealand) Robbie Paul | Interchange | | (England) Mark Smith |
| | (England) Lee Radford | Interchange | | (England) Gareth Hock |
| | (England) Paul Anderson | Interchange | | (Ireland) Terry O'Connor |
| | (England) Brian Noble | Coaches | | (England) Mike Gregory |

== World Club Challenge ==
Having won the championship, the Bradford Bulls were to play 2003 NRL season premiers, the Penrith Panthers in the following February's World Club Challenge.
