= Brad Meyers =

Australia international rugby league footballer

Personal information
- Full name: Bradley Meyers
- Born: 5 January 1980 (age 46) Brisbane, Queensland, Australia

Playing information
- Height: 189 cm (6 ft 2 in)
- Weight: 108 kg (17 st 0 lb)
- Position: Prop, Second-row
Club
Years	Team	Pld	T	G	FG	P
2000–04	Brisbane Broncos	102	7	0	0	28
2004–06	Bradford Bulls	52	13	0	0	52
2007–11	Gold Coast Titans	75	11	0	0	44
	Total	229	31	0	0	124
Representative
Years	Team	Pld	T	G	FG	P
2001	Queensland	3	0	0	0	0
2001	Australia	4	1	0	0	4

Bradley Meyers (born 5 January 1980), also known by the nicknames of "Big Red", or "Two Step", is an Australian former professional rugby league footballer who played in the 2000s and 2010s. A Queensland State of Origin and Australian national representative forward, he played his club football in the National Rugby League for the Brisbane Broncos and the Gold Coast Titans, and in the Super League for the Bradford Bulls, with whom he won 2005's Super League X Championship.

== Background ==
Meyers attended school at Villanova College where he initially played rugby union. While attending Villanova College, Meyers played for the Australian Schoolboys team in 1997. While with the Brisbane Broncos, he also played for the Past Brothers in the Queensland Cup.

== Brisbane Broncos ==
Having won the 2000 NRL Premiership, the Brisbane Broncos traveled to England to play against 2000's Super League V Champions, St Helens R.F.C. for the 2001 World Club Challenge, with Meyers playing from the interchange bench and scoring a try in Brisbane's loss. He made his début for the Broncos in the Australian National Rugby League competition and later was picked for the State of Origin series in Australia where he represented the Queensland Maroons in their triumph over their fierce rivals the New South Wales Blues. The big redhead then went on to represent Australia in two tests against New Zealand and Great Britain on the 2001 Kangaroo tour. He played 102 games for the Brisbane Broncos before signing for the Bradford Bulls in 2005.

== Bradford Bulls ==
Meyers had two seasons at the Bradford Bulls and played in the 2005 Super League grand final-winning team that beat Leeds 15–8. As Super League champions Bradford faced National Rugby League premiers Wests Tigers in the 2006 World Club Challenge. Meyers played at second-row forward in the Bulls' 30-10 victory.

== Gold Coast Titans ==
On 1 July 2006, it was announced that the new NRL franchise, the Gold Coast Titans, had signed Meyers on a two-year deal. Meyers stated, "I am really looking forward to playing with the Titans. It's a new challenge for my career and I couldn't think of a better place to be." He did however explain that he "really enjoyed playing here at Bradford. It was a change I needed but now it is time to head back home. I have a few goals I wish to achieve within the NRL and feel that these last couple of years have given me a solid background on which to make my return." In May 2011, Meyers announced that would be his last year in the NRL.

Myers only managed to play two games for the Gold Coast in the 2011 NRL season as the club finished last and claimed the wooden spoon.

== Personal ==
Brad is an Australian Apprenticeships Ambassador for the Australian Government.
