= Stuart Reardon =

GB & England international rugby league footballer

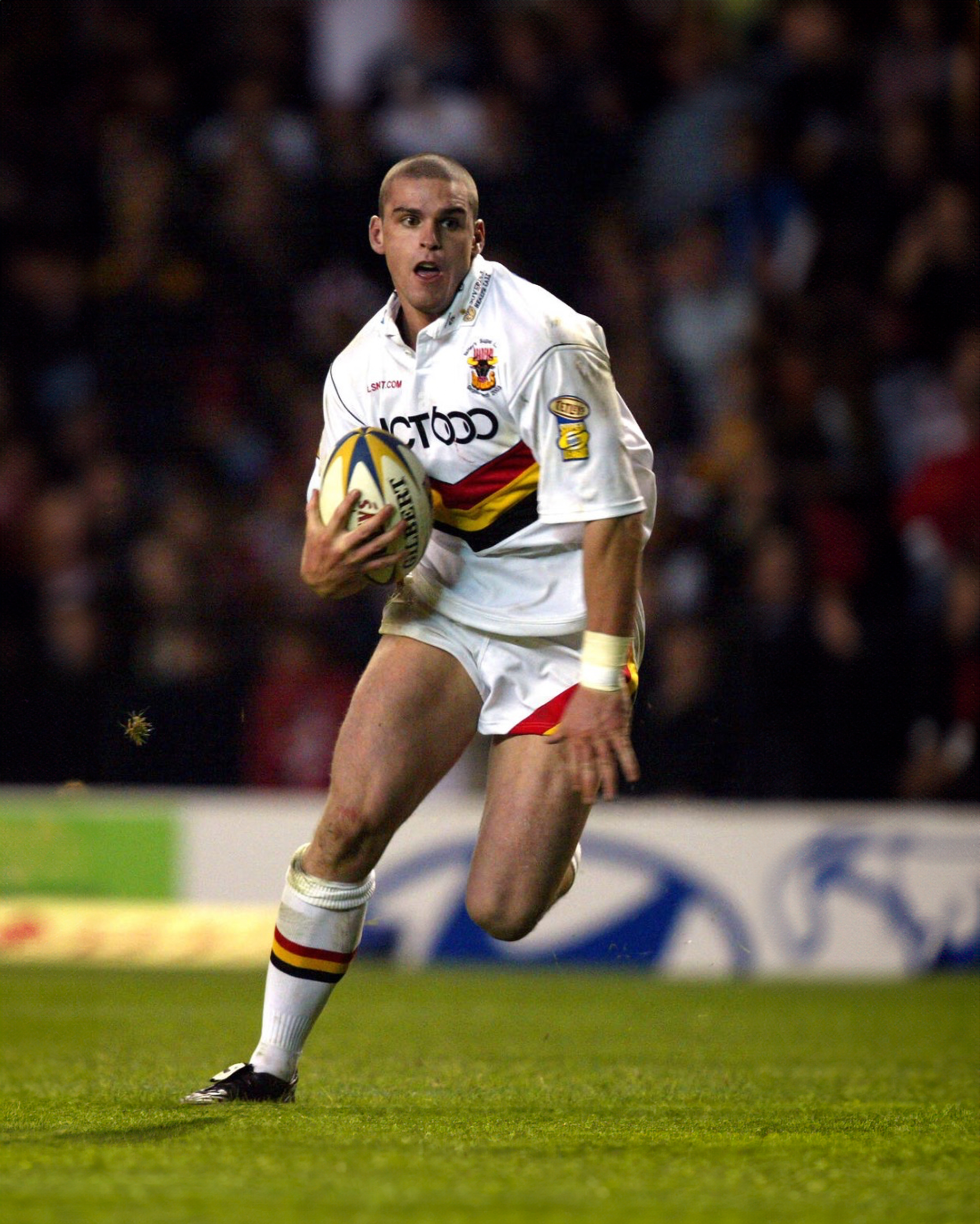
- Reardon in the 2003 super league grand final

Personal information
- Born: 13 October 1981 (age 44) Bradford, West Yorkshire, England

Playing information
- Height: 6 ft 0 in (1.82 m)
- Weight: 13 st 5 lb (85 kg)
- Position: Fullback, Wing, Centre
Club
Years	Team	Pld	T	G	FG	P
2002	Featherstone Rovers	5	0	0	0	0
2002	Salford City Reds	8	3	0	0	12
2003–05	Bradford Bulls	72	32	0	0	128
2005–08	Warrington Wolves	54	15	0	0	60
2010	Bradford Bulls	16	5	0	0	20
2011	Crusaders RL	26	11	0	0	44
2012	AS Carcassonne	20	7	0	0	28
2013–16	North Wales Crusaders	57	13	0	0	52
	Total	258	86	0	0	344
Representative
Years	Team	Pld	T	G	FG	P
2002–03	England 'A'	5	1	0	0	4
2005	England	2	0	0	0	0
2004	Great Britain	5	4	0	0	16

Stuart Reardon (born 13 October 1981) is an English former professional rugby league footballer who played as a fullback, wing, or centre. An England and Great Britain international, he played for Bradford Bulls, Warrington Wolves and North Wales Crusaders, and also had loan spells with Featherstone Rovers and Salford City Reds during his early career.

== Playing career ==
=== Club ===
Reardon turned professional from West Bowling A.R.L.F.C. (in West Bowling, Bradford) to sign for the Bradford Bulls in 2000. He was loaned out to Featherstone Rovers at the start of the 2002 season. When former Bradford Bulls assistant coach Karl Harrison took over as head coach of the Salford City Reds, he signed Reardon on loan to boost the Salford City Reds' fight against relegation.

He enjoyed a rapid rise from Academy to Super League and Test rugby league between 2002 and 2004.

He returned to the Bradford Bulls in 2003 and found a place in the first team after a long term injury to Michael Withers, making 20 appearances in the title-winning Bradford Bulls team, including being fullback in the 2003 Super League Grand Final against Wigan Warriors in which he scored a try. Reardon scored a try and won the Harry Sunderland Trophy for his man of the match performance at the Old Trafford showdown. Having won Super League VIII, Bradford played against 2003 NRL Premiers, the Penrith Panthers in the 2004 World Club Challenge. Reardon played from the interchange bench in the Bradford Bulls' 22–4 victory. Later that year Reardon played for the Bradford Bulls as a wing in their 2004 Super League Grand Final loss against the Leeds Rhinos. He missed the back end of 2005's Super League X with injury.

In September 2005, Reardon turned down a new contract with Bradford and joined Warrington Wolves. Paul Cullen described as the 'best kick returner in Super League' during 2006's Super League XI, Reardon was the Warrington Wolves leading tackle-buster with 66 in his first year at the club.

Reardon joined Hull in April 2009, but was released 11 days later after a failed medical. He re-joined his former club Bradford in October 2009.

He won the double with AS Carcassonne in France in 2012 – ( French Elite League champions and French Elite Cup winners ) He won the double in 2013 with North Wales Crusaders – ( Championship 1 champions and Championship bowl cup winners. )

=== International ===
Reardon earned a call up to the England 'A' tour of Fiji and Tonga in 2002, where he worked with Warrington Wolves coach Paul Cullen. Reardon represented England 'A' while at the Bradford Bulls in the 2003 European Nations Cup against Wales and France.

He broke into the Great Britain squad for the 2004 Tri Nations series, and scored four tries in the tournament. Reardon won caps for Great Britain while at the Bradford Bulls in 2004 against Australia (3-matches), and New Zealand (2-matches), and won caps for England while at the Bradford Bulls in 2005 against France, and New Zealand (interchange/substitute).

He made the England team at the end of the 2005 season, and toured Australia and New Zealand as a stand-by for the Great Britain squad in 2006.

== Post-playing career ==
Following his retirement from professional rugby league, Reardon worked as a personal trainer and fitness model.

He appeared on book-covers and in advertising campaigns, including for Axiom for Men.

Reardon later expanded into fitness, publishing, photography and digital media. He is the founder of ReardonFit, where he develops fitness programmes, cookbooks and digital health resources.

He also works as a photographer, content creator and published author. Together with Jane Harvey-Berrick, he has co-authored contemporary romance and romantic comedy novels that have been translated into seven languages.
