= Paul Johnson (rugby league, born 1978) =

English rugby league footballer (born 1978)

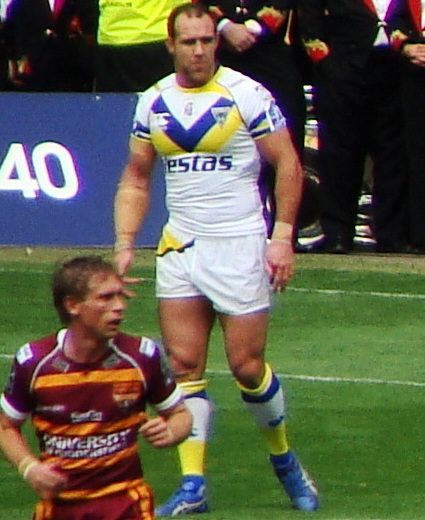

Personal information
- Born: 25 November 1978 (age 47) Wigan, Greater Manchester, England

Playing information
- Height: 6 ft 0 in (1.83 m)
- Weight: 15 st 2 lb (96 kg)
- Position: Wing, Centre, Second-row
Club
| Years | Team | Pld | T | G | FG | P |
|---|---|---|---|---|---|---|
| 1995–03 | Wigan Warriors | 108 | 43 | 0 | 0 | 172 |
| 2004–06 | Bradford Bulls | 54 | 19 | 0 | 0 | 76 |
| 2007–09 | Warrington Wolves | 53 | 18 | 0 | 0 | 72 |
| 2010 | Wakefield Trinity Wildcats | 15 | 4 | 0 | 0 | 16 |
| 2011 | Crusaders RL | 10 | 0 | 0 | 0 | 0 |
| | Total | 240 | 84 | 0 | 0 | 336 |
Representative
| Years | Team | Pld | T | G | FG | P |
| 1998 | Emerging England | 1 | 0 | 0 | 0 | 0 |
| 2001–05 | Great Britain | 12 | 5 | 0 | 0 | 20 |
| | Lancashire |

Paul Johnson (born 25 November 1978) is an English former professional rugby league footballer who played in the 1990s, 2000s and 2010s. He played at representative level for Great Britain, Emerging England and Lancashire, and at club level for the Wigan Warriors, the Bradford Bulls, the Warrington Wolves, the Wakefield Trinity Wildcats and Crusaders RL, as a wing, centre or second-row.

== Background ==
Johnson was born in Wigan, Greater Manchester, England.

== Club career ==
=== Wigan Warriors ===
Johnson made his professional début from the bench as a 17-year-old for Wigan in 1995.

He played for Wigan from the interchange bench in their 1998 Super League Grand Final victory over Leeds.

Johnson played for Wigan from the interchange bench in their 2001 Super League Grand Final loss to Bradford.

Johnson played for Wigan from the interchange bench in the 2003 Super League Grand Final which was lost to Bradford.

=== Bradford Bulls ===
Johnson joined Bradford from the Wigan club in 2004. Having won Super League VIII, Bradford played against 2003 NRL Premiers, the Penrith Panthers in the 2004 World Club Challenge. Johnson played as a centre in Bradford's 22–4 victory. He played for Bradford as a centre in their 2004 Super League Grand Final loss against Leeds.

The following year he played for Bradford as a second-row in their 2005 Super League Grand Final victory against the Leeds.

As Super League champions Bradford faced National Rugby League premiers Wests Tigers in the 2006 World Club Challenge. Johnson played as a second-row in Bradford's 30–10 victory.

=== Later career ===
Johnson joined Warrington from the Bradford side in 2007.

In October 2010, Johnson was signed by Crusaders after being released by Wakefield. He made his final Super League appearance in September 2011 against former club Wigan, announcing his retirement shortly after the game.

== International career ==
In 1998, Johnson played for Emerging England in a 15–12 victory over Wales.

Johnson made his Great Britain début in 2001, went on to play in the 2004 and 2005 Rugby League Tri-Nations. Johnson was voted 'Back of the Series' against Australia in 2001.

Johnson was then selected in the Great Britain team to compete in the end of season 2004 Rugby League Tri-Nations tournament. In the final against Australia he played from the interchange bench in the Lions' 44–4 loss.

He missed a large part of the 2005's Super League X with shoulder and thumb injuries but was in sensational form on his return and gained selection for the Tri Nations tournament, scoring a hat-trick against New Zealand.

== Personal life ==
In February 2003 his younger brother, Wigan academy player Craig Johnson, was killed in a car crash along with Billy-Joe Edwards, a promising Wigan academy player and younger brother of former Wigan player Shaun Edwards.
