= Andy Smith (rugby league) =

English rugby league footballer

Personal information
- Full name: Andrew Smith
- Born: 6 July 1984 (age 41) Wakefield, West Yorkshire, England
- Height: 6 ft 3 in (1.91 m)
- Weight: 15 st 4 lb (97 kg)

Playing information
- Position: Wing
Club
| Years | Team | Pld | T | G | FG | P |
|---|---|---|---|---|---|---|
| 2004–06 | Bradford Bulls | 19 | 7 | 0 | 0 | 28 |
| 2005(loan) | →Salford City Reds | 4 | 1 | 0 | 0 | 4 |
| 2007 | Harlequins RL | 12 | 7 | 0 | 0 | 28 |
| 2008 | Halifax | 13 | 4 | 0 | 0 | 16 |
| 2009 | Rochdale Hornets | 2 | 0 | 0 | 0 | 0 |
| 2011–12 | Dewsbury Rams | 25 | 2 | 0 | 0 | 8 |
| 2016 | York City Knights | 9 | 2 | 0 | 0 | 8 |
| | Total | 84 | 23 | 0 | 0 | 92 |

Andy Smith (born 6 July 1984) is an English former professional rugby league footballer who played as a wing.

Smith was the first try scorer of the annual magic weekend in 2007.

== Background ==
Smith was born in Wakefield, West Yorkshire, England.

== Early career ==
A former junior player with the Wakefield based Westgate Wolves ARLFC where Smith topped the try scoring list one season with an impressive 87 tries, Smith came into the Bulls Squad midway through the 2001 season after a string of impressive displays in the Bulls Senior Academy side. Smith made great strides making twelve appearances as well as having a stint with his old boss Karl Harrison on loan at Salford.

In 2006 Smith was awarded a special prize by the Bulls for finishing Top Try Scorer in the Senior Academy with 27.

== Bradford Bulls ==
Smith turned down a move to Super League rivals Castleford Tigers at the beginning of 2006. Smith told the Bradford Telegraph & Argus: "I'm going to fight my way into the Bulls side."

On 14 November 2006 he signed a one-year deal.

== Harlequins RL ==
On 6 February 2007 Smith signed for Harlequins RL but was released at the end of the season.

It was during this spell in which Smith made history by becoming the first ever player to score at the annual Magic Weekend event.

He was then quickly snapped up by highly ambitious Halifax on 13 October.

== Halifax ==
Having been released by 'Quins coach Brian McDermott at the end of the 2007 Super League season. Smith joined part-time club Halifax on a one-year contract. Smith left Halifax midway through the 2008 season because of disagreements with senior management.

== York City Knights ==
Smith came out of retirement to play for York City Knights in 2016.
