= 2004 Super League season =

British rugby league season

Super League IX
- League: Super League
- Duration: 28 Rounds
- Teams: 12
- Highest attendance: 23,375; Bradford Bulls vs Leeds Rhinos (2 July)
- Lowest attendance: 2,198; London Broncos vs Salford City Reds (28 March)
- Attendance: 1,439,706 ▲ (average 8,570)
- Broadcast partners: Sky Sports

2004 Season
- Champions: Leeds Rhinos; 1st Super League title 4th British title
- League Leaders: Leeds Rhinos
- Man of Steel: (England) Andrew Farrell
- Top point-scorer(s): (England) Kevin Sinfield (277)
- Top try-scorer(s): (Tonga) Lesley Vainikolo (36)

Promotion and relegation
- Promoted from National League One: Leigh Centurions
- Relegated to National League One: Castleford Tigers

Tetley's Super League IX was the name of the 2004 Super League championship season due to sponsorship by Tetley's Bitter. This was the 110th season of top-level professional rugby league held in Britain, and the ninth championship decided by Super League. The season culminated in the grand final between Leeds Rhinos and Bradford Bulls, which Leeds won, claiming the 2004 title.

== Season summary ==
During this season Leeds claimed a couple of records, they became the 1st team until Castleford in 2017 to accumulate 50 points from the regular rounds and finished a record 9 points clear of 2nd placed Bradford Bulls, they also became only the 2nd team in the Super League era to finish at home with a 100% record in the regular weekly rounds. Lesley Vainikolo scored more tries than anybody else that season with 37, beating Danny McGuire who finished on 36.

== Table ==
Pos	Team	Pld	W	D	L	PF	PA	PD	Pts	Qualification
1	Leeds Rhinos (L, C)	28	24	2	2	1037	443	+594	50	Semi Final
2	Bradford Bulls	28	20	1	7	918	565	+353	41	Semi Final
3	Hull F.C.	28	19	2	7	843	478	+365	40	Elimination Semi Final
4	Wigan Warriors	28	17	4	7	736	558	+178	38	Elimination Semi Final
5	St Helens	28	17	1	10	821	662	+159	35	Elimination Semi Final
6	Wakefield Trinity Wildcats	28	15	0	13	788	662	+126	30	Elimination Semi Final
7	Huddersfield Giants	28	12	0	16	518	757	−239	24	
8	Warrington Wolves	28	10	1	17	700	715	−15	21	
9	Salford City Reds	28	8	0	20	507	828	−321	16	
10	London Broncos	28	7	1	20	561	968	−407	15	
11	Widnes Vikings	28	7	0	21	466	850	−384	14	
12	Castleford Tigers (R)	28	6	0	22	515	924	−409	12	Relegation to National League One

Source: Rugby League Project
Rules for classification: 1) Points; 2) Points difference; 3) Number of points scored;
(C) Champions; (L) League Leaders' Shield Winners; (R) Relegated

== Play-offs ==
Elimination play-offs
3	Hull	18
6	Wakefield Trinity Wildcats	28
4	Wigan Warriors	18
5	St. Helens	12

Qualifying / Elimination semifinal
1	Leeds Rhinos	12
2	Bradford Bulls	26
Wigan Warriors	18
Wakefield Trinity Wildcats	14

Elimination final
Leeds Rhinos	40
Wigan Warriors	12

Grand Final
Leeds Rhinos	16
Bradford Bulls	8

== Media ==
=== Television ===
Live Super League IX matches were broadcast in the United Kingdom by Sky Sports in the first year of a new five-year television deal. The contract was signed less than three weeks before the start of the season. The deal, worth £53 million, represented a 15 percent, or £7 million, increase on the last contract. The contract would run until the end of the 2008 season and also cover the international game minus the 2008 World Cup, which is worth £5 million of the total amount. It was speculated in the media that clubs would receive around £700,000-£800,000 per year from the deal - less than the £1 million clubs received in 1995 when British rugby league agreed to switch to a summer season. The clubs had received in initial offer of £55.5 million from Sky, one of two offers rejected; after that offer was declined the amount was reduced with the final figure agreed being settled later after an intervention by Maurice Lindsay. Sky's offer took into account their dissatisfaction with the - BBC requested - proposed move of the Challenge Cup Final to between May and August in 2005, which they believed was too near to the October Grand Final. An RFL spokesman said: "To increase our overall take in a falling market is a major step forward for our game". Vic Wakeling speaking for Sky said: "Our relationship with rugby league is one of the longest in the 12-year history of Sky Sports and we are delighted to be announcing the same again in terms of Super League and international rights.

The BBC secured secondary broadcast rights to show the Super League play-offs and Grand Final nationally with a provision to show match highlights of regular season games. Previously, a deal with the BBC had seen a Sky highlights package shown in the BBC's northern regions.

== See also ==
- 2004 Super League Grand Final
- 2004 Challenge Cup
