= Rob Parker (rugby league) =

Former England international rugby league footballer

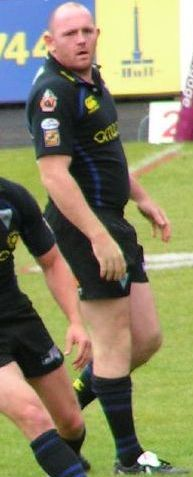

Personal information
- Full name: Robert Russell Parker
- Born: 5 September 1981 (age 44) Westhoughton, Bolton, England

Playing information
- Height: 6 ft 0 in (183 cm)
- Weight: 17 st 2 lb (109 kg)

Rugby league
- Position: Prop, Second-row, Loose forward
Club
Years	Team	Pld	T	G	FG	P
2000–05	Bradford Bulls	96	14	0	0	56
2001(loan)	→ London Broncos	9	1	0	0	4
2005–08	Warrington Wolves	66	6	0	0	24
2009–11	Salford City Reds	40	4	0	0	16
2011(loan)	→ Castleford Tigers	8	2	0	0	8
2012–13	Leigh Centurions	40	6	0	0	24
	Total	259	33	0	0	132
Representative
Years	Team	Pld	T	G	FG	P
2004–04	England	3	1	0	0	4

Rugby union
Club
Years	Team	Pld	T	G	FG	P
	Wakefield RFC	7	0	0	0	0

Rob Parker (born 5 September 1981) is an English former professional rugby league footballer who played in the 2000s and 2010s. He played for Leigh, signing from Super League neighbours Salford City Reds in time for the 2012 season. An England international representative forward, he previously played for Super League clubs; the Bradford Bulls, London Broncos and the Warrington Wolves.

== Playing career ==
=== Rugby league ===
Parker played his junior rugby with Leigh East. Débuting in 2000, Parker marked his case for a regular position in Super League during a ten-game loan spell with the London Broncos in 2001. He then rose out of the Bradford Bulls Academy to play in the pack. He collected Super League medals in 2003 and 2005 and played in a winning Challenge Cup Final (2003) and World Club Challenge (2004). He missed out on a spot in the 2003 Super League Grand Final. Having won Super League VIII, the Bradford Bulls played against 2003 NRL Premiers, the Penrith Panthers in the 2004 World Club Challenge. Parker played from the interchange bench in the Bradford Bull's 22–4 victory. At the end of that year he played for the Bradford Bulls from the interchange bench in their 2004 Super League Grand Final loss against Leeds.

=== Rugby union ===
An accomplished performer in both front and second row. Whilst at the Bradford Bulls, Parker was loaned out to Wakefield RFC where he made seven rugby union appearances over two seasons.

=== International ===
He was appointed England captain in 2004 and led England to the European Nations Cup. Parker won 3 caps for England while at the Bradford Bulls in 2004 against Russia, France and Ireland.

He was signed by the Warrington Wolves for 2006's Super League XI, released from his contract at the end of the 2008 season. After joining Salford City Reds he was announced as their new club captain on 10 February after long-serving captain Malcolm Alker was stripped of the captaincy during pre-season.

In July 2011, he went on loan to the Castleford Tigers. Parker joined hometown club the Leigh Centurions in time for the 2012 Co-operative Championship season.
