= Karl Pratt =

GB & England international rugby league footballer

Personal information
- Born: 18 July 1980 (age 46) Leeds, England

Playing information
- Position: Wing, Stand-off, Scrum-half, Hooker
Club
Years	Team	Pld	T	G	FG	P
1997–98	Featherstone Rovers	48	30	0	0	120
1999–02	Leeds Rhinos	81	38	0	0	152
2003–05	Bradford Bulls	59	20	0	0	80
	Total	188	88	0	0	352
Representative
Years	Team	Pld	T	G	FG	P
2001	England	1	1	0	0	4
2002	Great Britain	2	1	0	0	4
	Yorkshire

Karl Pratt (born 18 July 1980) is an English former professional rugby league footballer who played in the 1990s and 2000s. He played at representative level for Great Britain, England and Yorkshire, and at club level for Featherstone Rovers, Leeds Rhinos, and Bradford Bulls (with whom he won the 2003 Super League Grand Final and Challenge Cup). Pratt usually played on the wing, but also played at stand-off, scrum-half, and hooker during his career.

== Career ==
Pratt started his amateur career with Hunslet Parkside. At the age of 15, he trained with hometown team Leeds, but was not taken on by the club. He signed for Featherstone Rovers in 1997, and spent two seasons at the club, scoring 30 tries in 48 appearances. Karl Pratt made his début for Featherstone Rovers on Sunday 8 June 1997, and he played his last match for Featherstone Rovers during the 1998 season, he played on the wing in Featherstone Rovers's 22–24 defeat by Wakefield Trinity in the 1998 First Division Grand Final at McAlpine Stadium, Huddersfield on 26 September 1998. In November 1998, he returned to Leeds after being signed for a fee worth up to £150,000.

Pratt won caps for England while at Leeds Rhinos 2001 Wales (sub), and won caps for Great Britain while at Leeds Rhinos 2002 Australia, and New Zealand.

Pratt played for the Bradford Bulls at stand-off half back in their 2003 Super League Grand Final victory against the Wigan Warriors. Having won Super League VIII, Bradford played against 2003 NRL Premiers, the Penrith Panthers in the 2004 World Club Challenge. Pratt played at scrum half back in the Bulls' 22–4 victory. He played for Bradford from the interchange bench in their 2004 Super League Grand Final loss against the Leeds Rhinos.

In 2005, Pratt announced his retirement at the age of 25 due to a persistent shoulder injury.
