= Michael Withers =

Ireland international rugby league footballer

Mick Withers
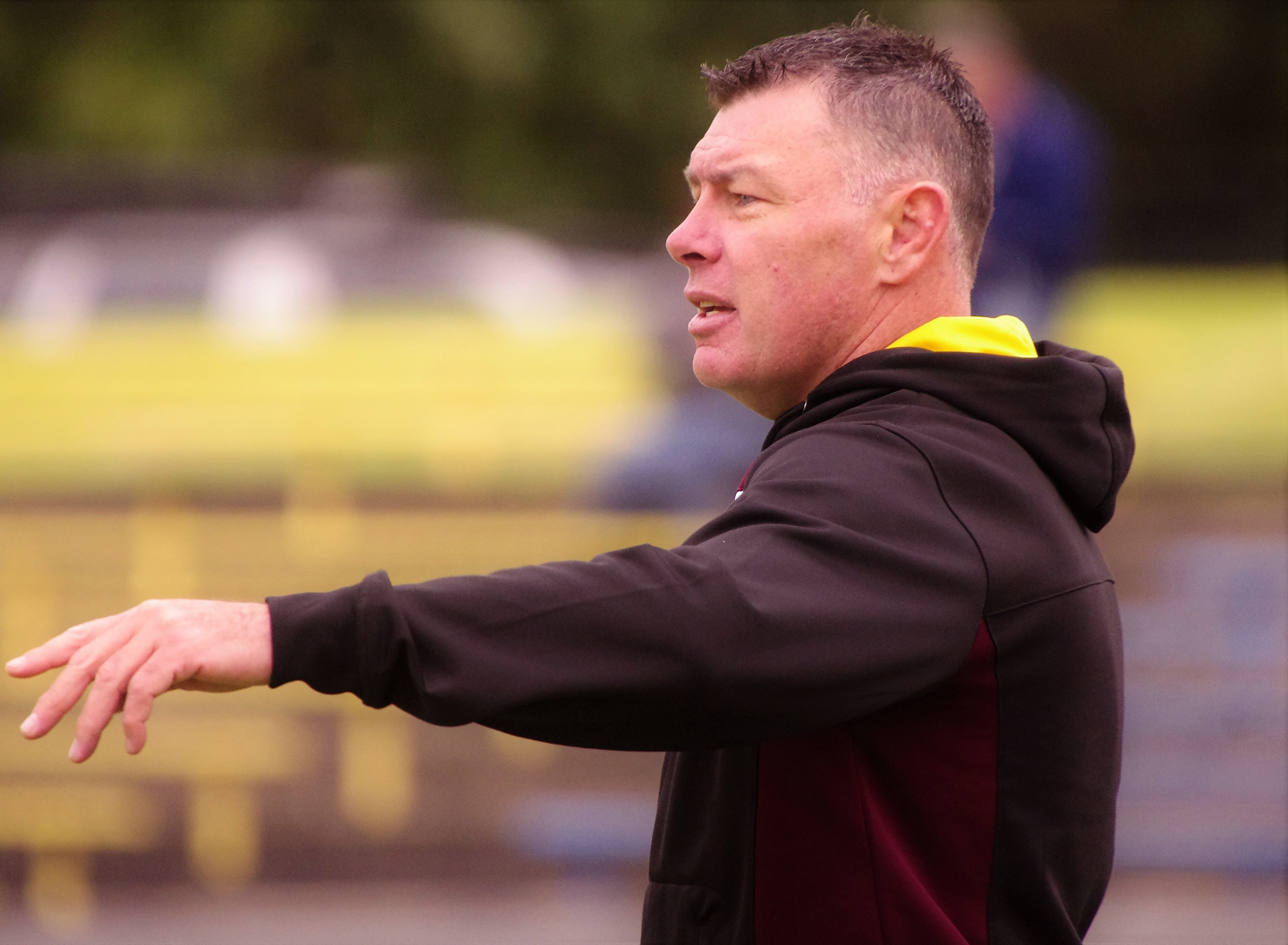

Personal information
- Full name: Michael Withers
- Born: 16 May 1976 (age 50) Sydney, New South Wales, Australia

Playing information
- Height: 188 cm (6 ft 2 in)
- Weight: 93 kg (14 st 9 lb)
- Position: Fullback, Wing, Centre
Club
Years	Team	Pld	T	G	FG	P
1995–98	Balmain Tigers	40	12	45	0	138
1999–06	Bradford Bulls	177	108	0	1	433
2007	Wigan Warriors	7	1	0	0	4
	Total	224	121	45	1	575
Representative
Years	Team	Pld	T	G	FG	P
2000–07	Ireland	5	2

Michael Withers (born 16 May 1976) is a former Ireland international rugby league footballer who played as a fullback, wing and centre in the 1990s and 2000s. He played club football in Australia for the Balmain Tigers in the National Rugby League, and in England with the Wigan Warriors and the Bradford Bulls in the Super League.

== Background ==
Withers was born in Sydney, New South Wales, Australia.

== Playing career ==
=== Australia ===
While attending John Paul II Senior High School in Marayong, New South Wales, Withers was selected for the Australian Schoolboys team in 1994. In the same year Withers won the Australian Dally M Junior Player of the Year.

=== England ===
Withers played for Bradford Bulls at centre in the 1999 Super League Grand Final which was lost to St Helens R.F.C. Withers qualified for Great Britain through his Irish grandparents and he played for Ireland in the 2000 World Cup. He played for the Bradford Bulls at fullback and scored 3 tries in their 2001 Super League Grand Final victory against the Wigan Warriors. As a result, he was awarded the Harry Sunderland Trophy. He is also the only player to have recorded a hat-trick in a Grand Final, doing so against Wigan Warriors for Bradford Bulls in 2001.

Withers was selected for Great Britain in the 2001 Ashes Series, but did not play due to injury concerns. Withers later withdrew himself from the Great Britain squad without playing a game. His initial selection in the Great Britain training squad by Australian coach David Waite created some controversy.

As Super League VI champions, the Bulls played against 2001 NRL Premiers, the Newcastle Knights in the 2002 World Club Challenge. Withers played fullback and scored two tries in Bradford's victory. Withers played for the Bradford Bulls at fullback, scoring a try in their 2002 Super League Grand Final loss against St. Helens. Withers played for the Bradford Bulls at centre in their 2003 Super League Grand Final victory against the Wigan Warriors. Having won Super League VIII, Bradford played against 2003 NRL Premiers, the Penrith Panthers in the 2004 World Club Challenge. Withers played at fullback in the Bulls' 22–4 victory. He also played for Bradford at fullback in their 2004 Super League Grand Final loss against the Leeds Rhinos. Withers played for the Bradford Bulls at fullback in their 2005 Super League Grand Final victory against Leeds Rhinos. He scored 108 tries in 170 games for the Bulls. He has won three Grand Finals and two Challenge Cups with the Bulls. As Super League champions Bradford faced National Rugby League premiers Wests Tigers in the 2006 World Club Challenge. Withers played at fullback in the Bulls' 30–10 victory.

Withers made his Wigan début in a 16–10 defeat by Warrington Wolves at the JJB Stadium on 9 February 2007. In June 2007 a knee injury forced Withers to retire.
