= List of Leeds Rhinos players =

This is a list of players who have played rugby league for the Leeds Rhinos (formerly Leeds RLFC).

In 2015, the club completed the task of assigning a unique heritage number to all current and former first-team players, based on the date they debuted for the club. All subsequent players have also been assigned a heritage number, again based on the date they make their first-team debut. Players with honours are listed at list of Leeds Rhinos players with honours.

Leeds have awarded Heritage Numbers for games played during the First World War when formal competition was suspended (entire season 1915–16 to January 1919 when formal competition resumed). These games are not considered to be official matches as they were played on an informal basis, and games from 1917–18 to resumption of formal competition in 1919 were played with 12 players on each team due to a shortage of players. Appearances during these games are therefore not included in formal statistics of player's careers. Seasons with unofficial games only are marked with an asterisk ("*"). Appearances during the Second World War are treated as official games because formal competition continued throughout the war.

== Players ==
Number	Name	Debut season	Position	Notes	Ref.
1	Bob Armstrong	1895–96	Forward	Played for Leeds in rugby union from 1892.	
2	John Bastow	1895–96	Halfback	Played for Leeds in rugby union from 1892. Later joined Hunslet.	
3	Joe Clarkson	1895–96	Threequarter	Played for Leeds in rugby union from 1894.	
4	Mark Fletcher	1895–96	Forward	Played for Leeds St Johns from 1889 and for Leeds in rugby union from 1890 to 1895.	
5	Joseph Goodall	1895–96	Forward		
6	Robert Gregg	1895–96	Forward	Played for Leeds in rugby union from 1894.	
7	Harry Hainstock	1895–96	Centre	Played for Leeds in rugby union from 1894. Brother of George Hainstock.	
8	Chris Hills	1895–96	Forward	Signed from North Durham rugby union	
9	James "Pop" Midgley	1895–96	Halfback	Played for Leeds in rugby union from 1892.	
10	Harry Parfitt	1895–96	Forward	Played for Leeds in rugby union from 1892.	
11	Joe Pickles	1895–96	Forward	Played for Leeds St Johns from 1889 and for Leeds in rugby union from 1890 to 1895.	
12	Joe Riley	1895–96	Forward	Played for Leeds in rugby union from 1893. Brother of George Riley.	
13	Sam Walker	1895–96	Fullback	Played for Leeds in rugby union from 1895. Played one game for Hunslet in 1901. Brother of Ben Walker.	
14	Bob Walton	1895–96	Threequarter	Played for Leeds St Johns from 1886 and for Leeds in rugby union from 1890 to 1895.	
15	Fred Wright	1895–96	Wing	Played for Leeds in rugby union from 1893.	
16	Henry Alwyn Close	1895–96	Centre	Signed from Wakefield. Brother of Jack Close.	
17	George Hainstock	1895–96	Centre	Played for Leeds in rugby union from 1895. Brother of Harry Hainstock.	
18	Harold Hargreaves	1895–96	Forward	Played for Leeds in rugby union from 1892.	
19	Albert Wray	1895–96	Forward		
20	Benjamin Clues Oliphant	1895–96	Forward		
21	Jack Close	1895–96	Centre	Signed from Wakefield. Brother of Henry Close.	
22	Harry Bradshaw	1895–96	Forward	England rugby union international (pre NU split) signed from Bramley.	
23	N Fowler	1895–96	Wing		
24	Alfred Buttle	1895–96	Forward		
25	William Henry Hirst	1895–96	Forward		
26	Tommy Summersgill	1895–96	Threequarter	Champion cyclist played for Leeds in rugby union from 1890.	
27	George Glover	1895–96	Forward	Played for Leeds under rugby union from 1894. Brother of Harry and Wallace Glover.	
28	George Fowler	1895–96	Forward	Played for Leeds St Johns from 1889 and for Leeds in rugby union from 1890 to 1895.	
29	James W Smith	1895–96	Forward	Later played for Hunslet.	
30	Harry Pyrah	1895–96	Halfback		
31	J Parker	1895–96	Forward		
32	William Thompson	1895–96	Forward		
33	Willie Smith	1895–96	Halfback		
34	Harry Sowden	1895–96	Forward	Signed from rugby union	
35	Frederick T Wilkinson	1895–96	Fullback	Played for Leeds St Johns from 1889 and for Leeds in rugby union from 1890 to 1895.	
36	Fred Hilton	1895–96	Wing		
37	Ben Walker	1895–96	Threequarter	Played for Leeds St Johns from 1890 and for Leeds in rugby union from 1890 to 1895. Brother of Sam Walker.	
38	William Henry Hannam	1895–96	Halfback	Played for Leeds in rugby union from 1894.	
39	Herbert Dyson	1895–96	Forward	Later played for Batley.	
40	William "Barry" Davies	1896–97	Forward	Leeds' first Welsh player. Wales rugby union international who had played for Cardiff.	
41	Jack "Jimmy" Lumley	1896–97	Threequarter		
42	George Riley	1896–97	Halfback	Brother of Joe Riley.	
43	Louis Carys	1896–97	Halfback	Played for Leeds in rugby union from 1894.	
44	Edward Tree	1896–97	Wing		
45	Walter Stanley Woolley	1896–97	Wing		
46	Wallace Glover	1896–97	Forward	Brother of Harry and George Glover.	
47	Tom Pickford	1896–97	Halfback	Also played for Holbeck	
48	James Dyer	1896–97	Forward		
49	Fred Greenwood	1896–97	Forward		
50	John William Jagger	1896–97	Fullback		
51	Albert Keech	1896–97	Wing	Later played for Bramley.	
52	Jim Thorpe	1896–97	Forward		
53	Wilfrid Jackson	1897–98	Halfback		
54	George Vickerman	1897–98	Forward		
55	Thomas Mardy	1897–98	Forward		
56	Glynn Hamilton West	1897–98	Centre	Later played for Hull KR. Became an MP and was knighted.	
57	Joseph Henry Emmerson	1897–98	Halfback		
58	John Hugginson	1897–98	Halfback		
59	Joe Major	1897–98	Forward	Played for Westmoreland 1896–97 under rugby union rules and played for Kendal Hornets	
60	George Richardson	1897–98	Forward		
61	John Hayton	1897–98	Forward	Played for Westmoreland in 1898 v Lancashire under NU rules	
62	William Fothergill	1897–98	Forward		
63	Patrick Connor	1897–98	Forward		
64	William Allinson	1897–98	Forward	Brother of George Allinson.	
65	Fred Mylan	1897–98	Forward	Later played for Hunslet.	
66	Robert Batchelor	1897–98	Centre	Signed from Southwark rugby union.	
67	Harry Blackburn	1897–98	Forward	Father of Edgar Blackburn. Signed from Hebden Brid	
68	Henry Cole	1898–99	Centre	Signed from Surrey rugby union.	
69	George Grace	1898–99	Scrum half	Played for Leeds from 1898 to 1905, but spent two years at York from 1899 to 1901.	
70	Herbert Moon	1898–99	Forward		
71	Albert Harrison	1898–99	Wing		
72	Ernest Pearson	1898–99	Forward	Later played for Shipley and Keighley.	
73	Joseph Quinn	1898–99	Forward		
74	Dominic Rogan	1898–99	Centre	Signed from Leeds Parish Church. Suspended sine die in 1900 for leading a strike for more pay.	
75	James Barker	1898–99	Centre		
76	Walter Scott	1898–99	Scrum half		
77	William Edward Stead	1898–99	Forward	Signed from Broughton Rangers.	
78	Joe Renton	1898–99	Forward		
79	John Henry Roberts	1899–1900	Centre		
80	Edgar Tottle	1899–1900	Halfback	Welsh halfback signed from rugby union.	
81	Rowland Watson	1899–1900	Forward		
82	Newby Westmoreland	1899–1900	Forward		
83	Walter Bullock	1899–1900	Forward		
84	Thomas Wright	1899–1900	Forward		
85	George Henry Buttery	1899–1900	Forward		
86	James Henry Hartley	1899–1900	Wing		
87	John William Hunt	1899–1900	Scrum half		
88	J.C. Collins	1899–1900	Wing		
89	John Percy Eddison	1899–1900	Forward		
90	George Allinson	1899–1900	Forward	Brother of William Allinson.	
91	William Bryan	1899–1900	Forward		
92	John William Turner	1899–1900	Scrum half	Signed from Huddersfield	
93	Thomas Crane	1899–1900	Forward		
94	William Davis	1899–1900	Scrum half		
95	John Metcalfe Lister	1899–1900	Centre		
96	Fred Walker	1899–1900	Forward		
97	William Bromley	1899–1900	Forward		
98	Francis Arthur Willey	1899–1900	Wing		
99	Alec Burrows	1899–1900	Wing		
100	Charles Harrison	1899–1900	Forward		
101	Frank Daltry	1899–1900	Stand off		
102	John Charles Waite	1899–1900	Forward		
103	Arthur Bentley	1899–1900	Centre	Later played for Liversedge.	
104	Edgar Biltcliffe	1899–1900	Forward	Brother of George Biltcliffe.	
105	George Biltcliffe	1899–1900	Forward	Brother of Edgar Biltcliffe.	
106	Alfred Lee	1899–1900	Centre		
107	Harry Glover	1899–1900	Forward	Brother of Wallace and George Glover.	
108	Arthur Hallas	1899–1900	Forward		
109	Tom Coleman	1900-01	Centre	Welsh centre signed from Leigh. Brother of James Coleman.	
110	Charles Law	1900-01	Centre		
111	Aaron Laycock	1900-01	Forward		
112	Shirley Malins	1900-01	Forward	Later played for Dewsbury.	
113	Harry Varley	1900-01	Halfback	England rugby union international pre NU split. Played for Leeds in rugby union in 1891 before joining Liversedge and then Oldham. Came out of retirement to play for Leeds in 1900.	
114	John Charles Boyden	1900-01	Forward		
115	Harry Day	1900-01	Forward		
116	Charles Crowther	1900-01	Forward		
117	Edward T Harrison	1900-01	Forward		
118	George Henry Lorriman	1900-01	Fullback	Signed from Huddersfield	
119	Tom Taylor	1900-01	Forward		
120	Howard Horner	1900-01	Forward		
121	Archibald James Ross	1900-01	Forward		
122	Arthur Stockburn	1900-01	Centre		
123	Thomas M Phillips	1900-01	Forward	Later played for Dewsbury.	
124	Robert Ward	1900-01	Stand off	Signed from Bramley. Brother of Belfred Ward.	
125	James Coleman	1900-01	Centre	Welsh centre signed from Leigh. Brother of Tom Coleman.	
126	Thomas Hanson	1900-01	Forward		
127	Fred Chadwick	1900-01	Centre		
128	Walter Bogg	1900-01	Scrum half		
129	Joseph Taylor	1900-01	Centre		
130	John Wilkinson Birch	1901–02	Forward		
131	Colin Crumpton	1901–02	Forward	Signed from Leeds Parish Church.	
132	Thomas Daniel Davies	1901–02	Centre	Signed from Oldham.	
133	Sam Herberts	1901–02	Centre		
134	George Hewlett	1901–02	Forward	Signed from Leeds Parish Church. Later played for Bramley.	
135	Harry Littlewood	1901–02	Fullback	Later played for Dewsbury.	
136	John McNicholas	1901–02	Forward	Signed from Leeds Parish Church.	
137	James Morton	1901–02	Forward		
138	George E Mosley	1901–02	Stand off	Signed from Leeds Parish Church.	
139	Harry Walker	1901–02	Forward	Signed from Leeds Parish Church.	
140	William Evans	1901–02	Wing	Welsh wing signed from Leeds Parish Church. First Leeds player to score more than 20 tries in a season.	
141	James Dean	1901–02	Fullback		
142	Dick Rhodes	1901–02	Forward		
143	Tom Midgley	1901–02	Forward	Signed from Liversedge.	
144	George W Andrews	1901–02	Wing		
145	Fred Mudd	1901–02	Wing	Signed from Hunslet.	
146	William Corcoran	1901–02	Fullback	Signed from Leeds Parish Church	
147	James G Moffatt	1901–02	Forward	Scottish forward signed from Oldham.	
148	Evan Barnett	1902–03	Forward	Welsh forward signed from rugby union. Later played for Treherbert.	
149	John Page Jenkins	1902–03	Wing	Welsh wing signed from rugby union. Later played for Treherbert.	
150	Tom Llewellyn	1902–03	Centre	Welsh centre signed from rugby union. Later played for Oldham. Cousin of William Llewellyn.	
151	Fred Webster	1902–03	Forward		
152	John William Stead	1902–03	Forward	Signed from Broughton Rangers.	
153	James Davison	1902–03	Forward		
154	William Woolf	1902–03	Forward	Welsh forward signed from rugby union. Later played for Treherbert.	
155	John Farrimond	1903-04	Fullback	Signed from Birkenhead.	
156	Herbert Smithson	1903-04	Centre		
157	Fred Wormald	1903-04	Forward	Signed from Oldham and later joined Rochdale Hornets.	
158	Thomas Waite	1903-04	Forward		
159	Joss Arthur Naylor	1903-04	Wing		
160	Elijah Watts	1903-04	Forward	Later played for Huddersfield.	
161	Ernest Holder	1903-04	Fullback		
162	William David Llewellyn	1903-04	Centre	Welsh centre signed from Whitchurch. Cousin of Tom Llewellyn. Later played for Huddersfield and Bramley.	
163	George Mennell	1903-04	Forward		
-	H Halliday	1904-05	Forward	Played only game in rearranged game against Batley in September 1904. Leeds have not recognised this game as an official match despite it being ordered by the Northern Union. Not awarded a Heritage Number.	
-	D Jacques	1904-05	Forward	Played only game in rearranged game against Batley in September 1904. Leeds have not recognised this game as an official match despite it being ordered by the Northern Union. Not awarded a Heritage Number.	
164	William Pickard	1904-05	Forward	Signed from York	
165	Phil Thomas	1904-05	Centre	Welsh international centre signed from Oldham. Later played for Hull KR.	
166	Albert Lunn	1904-05	Forward	Signed from Hunslet	
167	Ike Leonard	1904-05	Wing		
168	Fred Wright	1904-05	Forward		
169	A Anderton	1904-05	Wing		
170	Albert Brayshaw	1904-05	Scrum half	Signed from Bramley having previously played for Leeds Parish Church and Holbeck. Later played for Dewsbury.	
171	Tom Herbert Wainright	1904-05	Forward	Signed from Bramley.	
172	Tom Bowen	1904-05	Wing	Signed from Holbeck.	
173	William Walsh	1904-05	Wing	Signed from Hunslet.	
174	Seth Burnley	1904-05	Forward	Later played for Bramley.	
175	Arthur Murray	1904-05	Fullback		
176	Robert Hurtley	1905-06	Fullback	Signed from Lancaster.	
177	Jim Hughes	1905-06	Wing	Signed from Widnes	
178	George William Davison	1905-06	Forward		
179	Frank Young	1905-06	Fullback	Welsh rugby union fullback signed from Tredegar. Played in the 1910 Challenge Cup Final.	
180	Martin Lavelle	1905-06	Fullback	Later played for York.	
181	Fred Harrison	1906-07	Forward		
182	William Rhodes	1906-07	Wing	Later played for Dewsbury and England.	
183	Ernest Adolphus Cochlin	1906-07	Scrum half	Welsh halfback signed from Huddersfield. Previously with Cardiff RFC.	
184	James Wood	1906-07	Wing		
185	Joseph Taylor	1906-07	Scrum half		
186	Patrick Greaney	1907-08	Scrum half	Welsh halfback signed from Tredegar RFC.	
187	Albert L Howell	1907-08	Centre		
188	Arthur Stones	1907-08	Full back		
189	William Biggs	1907-08	Forward	Welsh forward signed from rugby union. Joined Hull KR in 1907, rejoining Leeds in 1909 and later signed for Oldham.	
190	William E Collingwood	1907-08	Wing	Signed from Bramley.	
191	Jimmy Fawcett	1907-08	Centre		
192	Thomas M Wilson	1907-08	Scrum half	Signed from Leicester rugby union.	
193	Henry Pattison	1907-08	Forward		
194	Thomas Scamans	1907-08	Wing	Later played for Bramley	
195	John Thomas Wray	1907-08	Forward	Later played for Hunslet.	
196	H Brown	1907-08	Forward		
197	Stephen Reed	1907-08	Centre		
198	Robert B Hargrave	1907-08	Wing		
199	George Desborough	1907-08	Wing	Later played for Bramley.	
200	William Noyes	1907-08	Centre	Army reservist from Grangetown in Wales.	
201	Ernest Chapman	1907-08	Scrum half		
202	James Batten	1907-08	Wing	Brother of Billy Batten. Also played for Hunslet and York.	
203	Arthur Burgess	1907-08	Scrum half	Signed from Leigh.	
204	Herbert Ibbitson	1907-08	Forward	Signed from Castleford rugby union	
205	Herbert Wade	1907-08	Centre		
206	Tom Swindells	1907-08	Wing		
207	Fred Upton	1907-08	Wing	Signed from Rochdale Hornets	
208	Sam Whitaker	1907-08	Forward	Signed from Wakefield although he did not play first team game for them.	
209	Frederick Carter	1907-08	Forward		
210	J Townend	1907-08	Forward		
211	Ernest Rowland	1907-08	Wing		
212	T Smith	1907-08	Centre		
213	J Wheatley	1907-08	Scrum half		
214	Reg Jones	1908-09	Scrum half	Welsh halfback signed from Cardiff rugby union	
215	Joseph Aloysius Laverly	1908-09	Wing	All Golds tourist in 1907-08 had a trial with St Helens before becoming Leeds' first overseas signing. Later signed for Leigh.	
216	Ernest Ware	1908-09	Stand off	Signed from Taunton rugby union. Later played for Dewsbury.	
217	Sam Wildman	1908-09	Forward	Later played for Hull who spell as 'Wileman'.	
218	John Jukes	1908-09	Forward		
219	Ben Dacre	1908-09	Scrum half		
220	Walter Goldthorpe	1908-09	Centre	Played as a guest for Leeds in rugby union in 1892. Joined Leeds after successful career with Hunslet, winning the Challenge Cup in 1910. Brother of Albert Goldthorpe.	
221	Herbert Maundrill	1908-09	Forward		
222	Herbert Atkinson	1908-09	Forward		
223	J Osborne	1908-09	Forward		
224	Ernest Oliver	1908-09	Wing		
225	Billy Jarman	1908-09	Forward	Star forward/utility back played in the 1910 Challenge Cup win. Died during the First World War.	
226	Enoch Hughes	1908-09	Forward	Welsh forward signed from rugby union.	
227	Charles Lugton Gillie	1908-09	Centre	Scottish centre signed from Melrose rugby union.	
228	Samuel Hunter	1908-09	Centre	Previously played rugby with the army.	
229	William Ward	1908-09	Second row	Forward played for Leeds until 1924 before joining York.	
230	Richard Hailes	1909-10	Forward		
231	Jimmy Sanders	1909-10	Scrum half	Signed as a junior from Welsh rugby union. Died during the First World War.	
232	Harold Rowe	1909-10	Wing	New Zealand international rugby league player signed following the All Golds tour.	
233	Thomas Wagstaff	1909-10	Forward		
234	Harry Topham	1909-10	Forward	Signed from Oldham	
235	Leonard Marshall	1909-10	Wing	Later played for Bramley. Brother of Lewis "Lou" Marshall.	
236	William Andrews	1909-10	Forward		
237	James W Duckworth	1909-10	Wing		
238	Fred Barron	1909-10	Wing	Signed from Hull KR	
239	Thomas Clint	1909-10	Wing		
240	Harry Thurlow	1909-10	Forward		
241	John Robert Brooksby	1910-11	Scrum half	Later played for Batley	
242	John Moran	1910-11	Centre		
243	George Alfred Grayson	1910-11	Fullback	Later played for Bramley	
244	Walter Emmerson Brook	1910-11	Scrum half		
245	Charles Edward Haycox	1910-11	Fullback	Signed from Hunslet	
246	Fred Godward	1910-11	Forward	Later played for Bramley	
247	Thomas Wynard	1910-11	Centre	Later played for Batley	
248	Ivor Evans	1910-11	Centre	Welsh centre signed from Newport rugby union	
249	Walter Harrison	1910-11	Forward		
250	Walter Pittock	1910-11	Fullback		
251	Frederick W Orchard	1911-12	Scrum half	Signed from Huddersfield. Later played for Brighouse Rangers	
252	Thomas E Thomas	1911-12	Fullback	Welsh fullback signed from Llanelli. Career ended by the First World War when he was a PoW.	
253	Robert Metcalfe	1911-12	Forward		
254	Fred Sullivan	1911-12	Centre	Welsh centre signed from Pill Harriers. Later played for Keighley. Charged with murder after retiring from rugby but found not guilty.	
255	William George Evans	1911-12	Forward	Welsh forward signed from Brynmawr RFC. Signed for York in 1914 but returned to Wales without playing a game	
256	Walter Mackay	1911-12	Centre	Welsh centre signed from Cardiff.	
257	Charles Edward Heaton	1911-12	Centre	Signed from rugby union. Later played for Hull KR.	
258	Walter Northrop	1911-12	Wing		
259	Arthur Sykes	1911-12	Forward	Later played for York.	
260	Jonathan Parker	1911-12	Wing		
261	Albert Dawson Dennis	1911-12	Wing	Later played for York.	
262	William Herbert Ganley	1911-12	Scrum half	Signed from Leigh. Later played for Huddersfield.	
263	Fred Mirfield	1911-12	Forward	Later played for York.	
264	Albert Rimmington	1912–13	Forward		
265	George Spivey	1912–13	Wing		
266	John Campbell	1912–13	Centre	Australian signed from Easts. Returned to Easts in 1921 having played for Leeds throughout the First World War.	
267	Leonard Leckenby	1912–13	Forward	Died during the First World War.	
268	-	-	-	Appears to be an error – Leeds name 268 as "AN Other" but no player missing from lineup in game vs Hull (A) 19 October 1912.	
269	Sidney Clifford Abbott	1912–13	Wing	Died during the First World War.	
270	Reginald W Pae	1912–13	Wing		
271	William "Hugh" Davies	1912–13	Wing	Welsh wing signed from Brynmawr rugby union	
272	James O'Neill	1912–13	Forward	Signed from Leigh	
273	John Sutton	1912–13	Forward	Later played for York.	
274	Sam Stacey	1912–13	Wing	Signed from Keighley	
275	William Avon Davies	1912–13	Centre	Welsh rugby union international centre signed from Devon. Became dual-code international and played in the "Rorke's Drift" Test against Australia in 1914. Joined Keighley in 1924.	
276	Daniel David Lewis	1912–13	Wing	Welsh rugby union wing signed from Cross Keys.	
277	Ledley Gilbertson	1912–13	Wing		
278	Fred Perrett	1913–14	Forward	Welsh rugby union international signed from Neath. Joined Hull but died during the First World War.	
279	Bernard Gould	1913–14	Hooker	Welsh hooker signed from Aberavon later played for Wakefield Trinity.	
280	John West	1913–14	Stand off	Welsh stand off signed from Cross Keys rugby union	
281	Thomas Harkness	1913–14	Prop	Later played for Batley.	
282	Joseph Jones	1913–14	Centre	Welsh centre later played for Wakefield Trinity	
283	William Lavin	1913–14	Stand off	Later played for St Helens	
284	Fred Barraclough	1913–14	Prop		
285	Lawrence Beecroft	1913–14	Wing		
286	Joseph Henry Hopkins	1913–14	Centre	Welsh centre signed from Abertillery died during the First World War.	
287	Arthur Llewellyn	1913–14	Wing	Welsh wing signed from Abertillery died during the First World War	
288	Ivor Jones	1913–14	Stand off	Welsh rugby union stand off signed from Neath later played for Batley	
289	Belfred Ward	1913–14	Centre	Brother of Robert Ward (#124). Died during the First World War.	
290	David Harkness Blakey	1913–14	Forward	Durham representative forward died during the First World War	
291	Albert Jenkinson	1914–15	Wing	Signed from Hunslet. Later played for Dewsbury.	
292	George Rees	1914–15	Hooker	Welsh hooker signed from Ammanford. Later played for Dewsbury.	
293	William Lynch	1914–15	Centre	Signed from York. Also played for Wakefield.	
294	Fred Carter	1914–15	Prop	Later played for York.	
295	Joseph Robert Pickles	1914–15	Forward	Died during the First World War.	
296	John "Jack" Chilcott	1914–15	Prop	Signed from Huddersfield	
297	Mark Ashcroft	1914–15	Wing		
298	Joe Brittain	1915-16*	Scrum half	Debuted in First World War. Played first official game in 1919.	
299	John Baird	1915-16*	Forward	South African forward played unofficial games during the First World War. Previously played for Dewsbury.	
300	Dudley Roe	1915-16*	Fullback	Played unofficial games only during the First World War.	
301	Walton	1915-16*	Stand off	Played unofficial games only during the First World War.	
302	Johnny Thomas	1915-16*	Scrum half	Guest from Wigan played unofficial games only during the First World War. Welshman signed from Maesteg.	
303	J.A. Garner	1915-16*	Forward	Played unofficial games only during the First World War.	
304	Bruce Howarth	1915-16*	Centre	Guest from Wakefield Trinity played unofficial games only during the First World War.	
305	Norman Reeves	1915-16*	Wing	Guest from Featherstone Rovers played unofficial games only during the First World War.	
306	Billy Seymour	1915-16*	Scrum half	Guest from Featherstone Rovers played unofficial games only during the First World War.	
307	Harold Buck	1915-16*	Wing	Guest from Hunslet played unofficial games during the First World War. Signed for Leeds officially in 1921, becoming the game's first £1,000 player. This is disputed as it was rumoured that another player (Cyril Arandle) was included in the deal. Also played for Bradford Northern.	
308	Ben Abbey	1915-16*	Scrum half	Guest from Bramley played unofficial games only during the First World War. Previously played for Batley.	
309	Richard Hughes	1915-16*	Stand off	Guest from Bramley played unofficial games only during the First World War.	
310	Joe McManus	1915-16*	Forward	Guest from Bramley played unofficial games only during the First World War.	
311	Albert Rosenfeld	1915-16*	Wing	Guest from Huddersfield played unofficial games only during the First World War.	
312	Harold Wagstaff	1915-16*	Centre	Guest from Huddersfield played unofficial games only during the First World War.	
313	Jerry Waterworth	1915-16*	Stand off	Guest from Batley played unofficial games only during the First World War.	
314	A Jones	1915-16*	Forward	Played unofficial games only during the First World War.	
315	Joseph Robinson	1915-16*	Scrum half	Guest from Batley played unofficial games only during the First World War.	
316	Fred Leek	1915-16*	Forward	Guest from Batley played unofficial games only during the First World War.	
317	Bill Jukes	1915-16*	Forward	Guest from Hunslet played unofficial games only during the First World War.	
318	Fred Smith	1915-16*	Stand off	Guest from Hunslet played unofficial games only during the First World War.	
319	Lew Bradley	1916-17*	Wing	Guest from Wigan played unofficial games only during the First World War. Signed for Wigan from Pontypool. Died during the First World War.	
320	Sydney Huckle	1916-17*	Forward	Played unofficial games only during the First World War.	
321	Lewis Marshall	1916-17*	Wing	Played unofficial games for Leeds during the First World War, making official debut in 1919. Joined Bramley in exchange for Squire Stockwell. Brother of Leonard Marshall.	
322	White	1916-17*	Forward	Sergeant in the army played one unofficial game during the First World War.	
323	Clifford Rawdon	1916-17*	Forward	Guest from Batley played unofficial games only during the First World War.	
324	Alonzo Walker	1916-17*	Hooker	Guest from Hunslet played unofficial games during the First World War. Made official debut in 1919 after signing for Leeds.	
325	Patrick Judge	1916-17*	Forward	Guest from Batley played unofficial games only during the First World War.	
326	Fred Howarth	1916-17*	Stand off	Played unofficial games only during the First World War.	
327	William Huskins	1916-17*	Forward	Guest from Hull KR played unofficial games only during the First World War.	
328	Sam Hullighan	1916-17*	Fullback	Guest from Hunslet played unofficial games only during the First World War.	
329	W Coombs	1916-17*	Wing	Played unofficial games only during the First World War.	
330	Ivor Rigby	1916-17*	Wing	Guest from Bramley played unofficial games only during the First World War.	
331	Eddie Catterall	1916-17*	Stand off	Guest from Dewsbury played unofficial games only during the First World War.	
332	John W Todd	1916-17*	Centre	Guest from Wakefield Trinity played unofficial games only during the First World War.	
333	-	-	-	Leeds have this as "Billy Ward". Appears to be a repeat of William Ward (#229) who was known as Billy.	
334	Fred Wilby	1916-17*	Centre	Guest from Wakefield Trinity played unofficial games only during the First World War.	
335	Albert Bolton	1916-17*	Fullback	Played unofficial games only during the First World War.	
336	Matt Ryder	1916-17*	Fullback	Guest from Swinton played unofficial games only during the First World War.	
337	Charles Foggett	1916-17*	Wing	Played unofficial games only during the First World War.	
338	William Thackrah	1916-17*	Scrum half	Played unofficial games only during the First World War.	
339	Joe Baldwin	1916-17*	Wing	Played unofficial games only during the First World War.	
340	John Pickles	1916-17*	Forward	Played unofficial games only during the First World War.	
341	Billy Batten	1916-17*	Wing	Guest from Hull played unofficial games only during the First World War. Brother of James Batten, father of Eric Batten and Robert Batten and grandfather of Ray Batten.	
342	Arthur Burton	1916-17*	Forward	Guest from Wakefield Trinity played unofficial games only during the First World War. Began his career with Leeds as a fullback, but played only A Team games before joining Wakefield where he moved into the forwards.	
343	Nealy Crosland	1916-17*	Forward	Guest from Wakefield Trinity played unofficial games only during the First World War.	
344	Fred Beevers	1916-17*	Forward	Played unofficial games only during the First World War.	
345	William Kennedy	1916-17*	Forward	Guest from Hull played unofficial games only during the First World War.	
346	Thomas Richardson	1916-17*	Stand off	Guest from Hull KR played unofficial games only during the First World War.	
347	Charles Smales	1916-17*	Fullback	Guest from Wakefield Trinity played unofficial games only during the First World War.	
348	Herbert Swift	1916-17*	Wing	Guest from Hull played unofficial games only during the First World War.	
349	James McGee	1916-17*	Forward	Guest from Wakefield Trinity played unofficial games only during the First World War.	
350	Herbert Fenton	1916-17*	Forward	Guest from Bramley played unofficial games only during the First World War.	
351	Clifford Jones	1916-17*	Scrum half	Guest from Hunslet played unofficial games only during the First World War.	
352	Joe Clarkson	1904-05	Fullback	Originally mistaken for another player named Joe Clarkson (Heritage Number 3) and was not awarded a Heritage Number. Heritage Number 352 was originally "AN Other" but has since been identified as William Pearson (Heritage Number 418)	
353	John Lockwood	1916-17*	Stand off	Guest from Batley played unofficial games only during the First World War.	
354	Alfred Huntingdon	1916-17*	Forward	Guest from Batley played unofficial games only during the First World War.	
355	Joseph Alwyn Ellis	1916-17*	Forward	Guest from Batley played unofficial games only during the First World War.	
356	Sam Haley	1916-17*	Forward	Guest from Bramley played unofficial games only during the First World War.	
357	James McEwan	1916-17*	Stand off	Guest from Bradford Northern played unofficial games only during the First World War.	
358	Walter Blakey	1917-18*	Forward	Guest from Wakefield Trinity played unofficial games only during the First World War.	
359	Robert Habron	1917-18*	Scrum half	Guest from Huddersfield played unofficial games only during the First World War.	
360	Herbert Illingworth	1917-18*	Fullback	Guest from Huddersfield played unofficial games only during the First World War.	
361	E Moorhouse	1917-18*	Forward	Played unofficial games only during the First World War.	
362	Henry Quinn	1917-18*	Stand off	Guest from Wakefield Trinity played unofficial games only during the First World War.	
363	Edgar Woolley	1917-18*	Wing	Guest from Wakefield Trinity played unofficial games only during the First World War.	
364	Charles Smith	1917-18*	Fullback	Guest from Wakefield Trinity played unofficial games only during the First World War.	
365	Albert Wilkinson	1917-18*	Scrum half	Guest from Keighley played unofficial games only during the First World War.	
366	James Parkinson	1917-18*	Fullback	Guest from Oldham played unofficial games only during the First World War.	
367	Ernest Donoghue	1917-18*	Wing	Played unofficial games only during the First World War.	
368	Robert James Ward	1917-18*	Scrum half	Guest from Bramley played unofficial games during the First World War. Signed formally for Leeds in 1919.	
369	Ernest Clarke	1917-18*	Scrum half	Guest from Leigh played unofficial games only during the First World War.	
370	Samuel Kershaw	1917-18*	Stand off	Guest from York played unofficial games only during the First World War.	
371	Fielding	1917-18*	Forward	Forward from Halifax Intermediate played unofficial games only during the First World War.	
372	Hedley Ryland	1917-18*	Stand off	Played unofficial games only during the First World War.	
373	Harry Wilson	1917-18*	Wing	Played unofficial games only during the First World War.	
374	Charles Woodcock	1917-18*	Scrum half	Played unofficial games only during the First World War.	
375	John Tingle	1917-18*	Centre	Played unofficial games only during the First World War.	
376	Jack Beames	1917-18*	Centre	Guest from Halifax played unofficial games only during the First World War. Signed by Halifax from Newport, later played for Bradford Northern.	
377	Arthur Pemberton	1917-18*	Stand off	Guest from Halifax played unofficial games only during the First World War.	
378	John Cyril Stacey	1917-18*	Wing	Guest from Halifax played unofficial games only during the First World War.	
379	Joe Winterburn	1917-18*	Forward	Guest from Bradford Northern played unofficial games only during the First World War.	
380	Tommy Muscroft	1917-18*	Scrum half	Guest from Bramley played unofficial games only during the First World War.	
381	William Bibey	1917-18*	Wing	Played unofficial games only during the First World War.	
382	Martin	1917-18*	Wing	Played unofficial games only during the First World War.	
383	Thomas Parker	1917-18*	Centre	Guest from Batley played unofficial games only during the First World War.	
384	Ernest Myers	1917-18*	Forward	Guest from Hunslet played unofficial games only during the First World War.	
385	Fred Noble	1917-18*	Scrum half	Guest from Halifax played unofficial games only during the First World War.	
386	Fred Hudson	1917-18*	Fullback	Guest from Batley played unofficial games only during the First World War.	
387	L Dobson	1917-18*	Centre	Guest from Bradford Northern played unofficial games only during the First World War.	
388	James Edward Lyons	1918-19*	Fullback	Guest from Batley played unofficial games only during the First World War.	
389	Squire Stockwell	1918-19*	Wing	Guest from Bramley played unofficial games during the First World War. Formally signed for Leeds in 1919 in exchange for Lou Marshall.	
390	Joe Lyman	1918-19*	Centre	Guest from Dewsbury played unofficial games only during the First World War.	
391	Ernest Rogers	1918-19*	Scrum half	Guest from Dewsbury played unofficial games only during the First World War.	
392	Billy Hall	1918-19*	Centre	Guest from Oldham played unofficial games only during the First World War.	
393	Alfred Francis	1918-19*	Scrum half	Guest from Hull played unofficial games only during the First World War. Previously played for Treherbert NU.	
394	George Boardman	1918-19*	Fullback	Played unofficial games only during the First World War.	
395	Jim Bacon	1918-19*	Centre	Welsh centre signed from Cross Keys. Debuted in unofficial game in 1919 before official debut in 1919. Later played for Castleford.	
396	Lister	1918-19*	Fullback	Sergeant from the army played unofficial games only during the First World War.	
397	A Treloar	1918-19*	Centre	Played unofficial games only during the First World War.	
398	George Todd	1918-19*	Centre	Guest from Huddersfield played unofficial games only during the First World War.	
399	George Turpin	1918-19*	Stand off	Guest from York played unofficial games only during the First World War.	
400	Daniel Mitchell	1919	Wing		
401	Sid Lancaster	1919	Fullback		
402	Arthur S Goldthorpe	1919	Fullback		
403	James Newton	1919	Second row		
404	John Clifford Pepper	1919	Wing		
405	William N Whiting	1919	Second row	Later played for York	
406	John James Moran	1919	Hooker	Later played for York	
407	John Henry Roberts	1919–20	Fullback		
408	H Clarkson	1919–20	Stand off		
409	John J Lavender	1919–20	Loose forward		
410	William Davis	1919–20	Second row	Signed from Gloucester rugby union. Later played for York.	
411	Sidney E Short	1919–20	Centre	Later played for York	
412	George Reynolds	1919–20	Hooker	Signed from Stroud rugby union. Later played for York.	
413	Syd Walmsley	1919–20	Wing	Later played for Huddersfield	
414	M Slater	1919–20	Second row		
415	Edward Perkins	1919–20	Wing		
416	Edward James Owen	1920–21	Fullback	Welshman signed from Cross Keys RFC. Later played for York and Dewsbury.	
417	William Pearson	1920–21	Second row	Signed from Hunslet. Should be #352 as debuted as Guest during the First world War.	
418	William Francis Wanklyn	1920–21	Scrum half	Signed from Welsh rugby union club Crumlin RFC. Later signed for Keighley.	
419	Arthur Binks	1920–21	Stand off	Later played for Wigan and Bradford Northern.	
420	Joseph Henry Hook	1920–21	Wing	Later played for York	
421	James Leahy	1920–21	Second row		
422	Henry Trusler	1920–21	Prop	Signed from Northampton rugby union. Later played for Keighley	
423	John Hardaker	1920–21	Hooker	Signed from Bradford Northern	
424	George Kibbler	1920–21	Second row	Later played for Huddersfield and died aged just 29.	
425	Robert Boagey	1921–22	Second row	Signed from Hull KR	
426	Archibald Brown	1921–22	Stand off	Welsh rugby union international signed from Newport. Later played for Dewsbury.	
427	Frederick Davage	1921–22	Second row	Welsh forward signed from Cross Keys along with William E Lyons. Also played for 'junior' teams Normanton and Castleford.	
428	Joe Dixon	1921–22	Prop		
429	Cyril Arandle	1921–22	Hooker	Signed from Hunslet in 1921. Rumoured to be the player included in the deal that saw Harold Buck sign for Leeds.	
430	William Ewert Lyons	1921–22	Wing	Welsh wing signed from Cross Keys also played for Halifax, Dewsbury and Castleford.	
431	Jim Roberts	1921–22	Scrum half		
432	Jack Woolmore	1921–22	Loose forward	Later played for Dewsbury	
433	Richard Hammond Cracknell	1921–22	Second row	Also played for Huddersfield, as did his son Dick Cracknell.	
434	William "Jock" Anderson	1921–22	Wing		
435	Arthur Thomas	1922–23	Prop	Welsh-born forward also played for York, Halifax and Dewsbury.	
436	Billy Bowen	1922–23	Centre	Welsh rugby union international signed from Swansea.	
437	George Jackson	1922–23	Hooker		
438	George Pickles	1922–23	Prop		
439	Albert Slater	1922–23	Fullback		
440	George Windsor	1922–23	Second row	Signed from Bramley. Brother of James Windsor. Also played for Bramley.	
441	Jack Ashton	1922–23	Loose forward	Signed from York. Later played for Bramley.	
442	Barney Hudson	1944–45	Wing	Leeds missed this player when the heritage list was originally compiled. Guest from Salford debuted against Barrow 23 Sep 1944.	
443	Joe Thompson	1922–23	Prop	Welsh rugby union international signed from Cross Keys. Set club goal and points records in career from 1922 to 1933.	
444	Edward Armitage	1922–23	Stand off		
445	Winfrey Holmes	1922–23	Second row		
446	Arnold Wilson	1922–23	Hooker		
447	George Broughton	1923–24	Wing	Wing later played for Hunslet. Father of George Broughton Jr and grandfather of John Atkinson.	
448	Horace Bennett	1923–24	Prop	Welsh rugby union forward signed from Cross Keys	
449	Jim Windsor	1923–24	Fullback	Brother of George Windsor	
450	William Gadsby	1923–24	Scrum half	Signed from Bramley	
451	Edwin Roberts	1923–24	Wing	Welsh back played for Cross Keys and signed from Northampton rugby union. Later played for Dewsbury and Castleford.	
452	Fred Waites	1923–24	Loose forward		
453	Louis Corsi	1923–24	Loose forward	Welsh former Rochdale forward signed from York. One of several brothers to play for Rochdale.	
454	Jack Grant	1923–24	Prop	Welsh rugby union prop signed from Cardiff. Later played for Pontypridd.	
455	Fred Millard	1923–24	Hooker	Signed from York and later joined Featherstone Rovers.	
456	Harry Goulthorp	1923–24	Wing	Wing later played for Hunslet.	
457	Eddie Uren	1923–24	Stand off	English rugby union wing signed from Pontypool (previously with Plymouth Albion in Devon).	
458	Joe Jones	1924–25	Centre	Welsh rugby union international centre signed from Swansea.	
459	Mel Rosser	1924–25	Centre	Welsh rugby union international centre signed from Penarth. Later played for York.	
460	Charlie Litt	1924–25	Prop	Later played for Hunslet	
461	Joe Hall	1924–25	Hooker	Signed from Dewsbury and later joined Featherstone Rovers.	
462	"A Smith"	1924–25	Wing	Triallist played as "A Smith" in game against Bramley in January 1925.	
463	Frank Burden	1924–25	Second row	Later played for Featherstone Rovers	
464	Frank Fletcher	1924–25	Stand off	Signed from Bramley and later played for Halifax.	
465	Joe Smith	1924–25	Fullback	Bradford Northern fullback played one trial game for Leeds while transfer-listed by Bradford. Returned to Bradford Northern.	
466	Charles Mason	1925–26	Prop		
467	Brinley "Bryn" Williams	1925–26	Wing	Dual-code Welsh international from Llanelli signed from Batley. Later played for Pontypridd.	
468	Jim Brough	1925–26	Full back	England rugby union international full back went on to become dual international and Leeds captain.	
469	John Henry Bradley	1925–26	Full back		
470	William Henry James	1925–26	Wing	Welsh rugby union wing signed from Aberavon	
471	Evan Williams	1925–26	Stand off	Welsh rugby union stand off signed from Aberavon	
472	Tommy Bailey	1925–26	Wing	Later played for Dewsbury	
473	William Tordoff	1925–26	Fullback		
474	Jim McCade	1926–27	Prop	Cumbrian forward later played for Batley	
475	Charles Arthur Lloyd	1926–27	Centre	Welsh centre signed from Penarth rugby union. Later played for York.	
476	F Smith	1926–27	Wing		
477	Emlyn Watkins	1926–27	Loose forward	Welsh rugby union international signed from Blaina. Later joined Oldham.	
478	Walter Swift	1926–27	Scrum half	Halfback played over 100 games for Leeds. Later played for Batley.	
479	Jenkins	1926–27	Wing		
480	Herbert Wharville	1926–27	Hooker	Later played for Batley.	
481	Tyson Hodgson Burridge	1926–27	Scrum half	Cumbrian halfback signed from Clifton after A Team trial game, debuted Christmas Day 1926.	
482	Harry Jones	1926–27	Wing	Wing scored 4 tries on debut, a record equalled only by Alan Smith. Later joined Halifax.	
483	Lionel James Slater	1926–27	Second row	Signed from Broughton Rangers.	
484	Dan Pascoe	1926–27	Second row	Welsh rugby union international signed from Neath. Later played for York.	
485	John Casey	1926–27	Stand off	Later played for Castleford	
486	James Curren	1926–27	Hooker		
487	Les "Juicy" Adams	1926–27	Scrum half	Halfback won Challenge Cups with Leeds, Huddersfield and Castleford. Died during the Second World War.	
488	George E Andrews	1926–27	Wing	Welsh rugby union international signed from Newport. Later played for Castleford.	
489	Jeff Moores	1927–28	Centre	Queensland rep centre. Later played for York.	
490	Frank O'Rourke	1927–28	Centre	NSW representative centre signed from University of Sydney	
491	Frank Gallagher	1927–28	Loose forward	GB international signed from Batley	
492	Wally Desmond	1927–28	Centre	New Zealand international later played for Castleford, Batley and Bramley.	
493	Billy Watson	1927–28	Hooker	Signed from Keighley	
494	Stan Satterthwaite	1927–28	Prop	Played for Leeds from 1927 to 1946. Inducted into Leeds Hall of Fame in 2022.	
495	William Demaine	1927–28	Hooker	Signed from Batley	
496	Allan Rawlings	1927–28	Prop		
497	George Goldie	1928–29	Fullback	Signed from Featherstone Rovers. Later played for Batley	
498	Fred Skelton	1928–29	Second row		
499	Jimmy Douglas	1928–29	Second row	Scottish forward signed from Halifax	
500	Frank W Hobson	1928–29	Wing		
501	John Harral Hudson	1928–29	Loose forward		
502	Tommy Askin	1928–29	Centre	Great Britain international centre signed from Featherstone Rovers. later played for Castleford.	
503	David Rees Jenkins	1928–29	Second row	Signed from Welsh rugby union. Later played for Barrow.	
504	Arthur "Candy" Evans	1929–30	Loose forward	Dual code international signed from Halifax. Also played for Castleford, Warrington and Leigh.	
505	Rowland Eastwood	1929–30	Fullback		
506	Harold Thomas	1929–30	Wing	Later played for York.	
507	Ernest Atkinson	1929–30	Wing		
508	Stan Smith	1929–30	Wing	Great Britain international signed from Wakefield Trinity.	
509	James Gill	1929–30	Loose forward	Later played for Keighley	
510	John Cox	1930–31	Second row	Signed from Bradford Northern and later played for Halifax.	
511	John Fletcher Fenwick	1930–31	Centre		
512	Eric Harris	1930–31	Wing	Queensland representative wing equalled club tries in a game (8) and broke all other Leeds scoring records including tries in a season (63 in 1935–36) and career (392).	
513	Parker	1930–31	Second row		
514	Harry Broadhead	1930–31	Stand off	Later played for Barrow	
515	Robert Smith	1930–31	Prop	Signed from Wigan Highfield. Later played for Warrington.	
516	Joe Busch	1930–31	Scrum half	Australian international halfback signed from Easts. Later played for Balmain.	
517	Les Grainge	1930–31	Wing	Signed from Otley rugby union. Later played for Hunslet.	
518	John Fawcett	1930–31	Scrum half		
519	Clement Man	1931–32	Hooker	Signed from Halifax rugby union	
520	James Powell	1931–32	Prop	Signed from Castleford	
521	David Rees James	1931–32	Prop	Welsh rugby union international signed from Treorchy	
522	John Lowe	1931–32	Hooker	Signed from Wigan Highfield	
523	Charlie Glossop	1931–32	Loose forward	Signed from Wakefield Trinity. Later played for Batley.	
524	Harold Westwood	1931–32	Scrum half		
525	Iorweth Jones	1931–32	Second row	Welsh rugby union international signed from Llanelli. Later played for Batley.	
526	Robert Whelan	1931–32	Hooker		
527	David Morgan Jenkins	1932–33	Prop	Welsh rugby union international signed from Hunslet. Later played for Dewsbury.	
528	Harry Curran	1932–33	Fullback		
529	Harry Dyer	1932–33	Second row	Later played for Batley	
530	Frank Wright	1932–33	Second row		
531	William John Morgan	1932–33	Centre	Signed from Dewsbury and later joined Broughton Rangers.	
532	Harry Newby	1932–33	Fullback	Originally with Buslingthorpe Vale, played just one game after signing from Wakefield Trinity.	
533	William John "Jack" Davies	1932–33	Fullback	Welsh fullback signed from York	
534	Ralph Green	1932–33	Second row	Signed from Dewsbury	
535	Don Pollard	1932–33	Fullback	Later played for Batley. Brother of Ernest Pollard.	
536	Septimus "Sep" Aspinall	1933–34	Loose forward	Signed from York, also played for Huddersfield and Featherstone Rovers.	
537	Iorwerth Isaac	1933–34	Second row	Welsh rugby union international also played for York.	
538	Albert Raymond "Dicky" Ralph	1933–34	Stand off	Welsh rugby union international signed from Newport. Later played for Batley.	
539	Ken Jubb	1933–34	Second row	Second row signed from Castleford. Father of Alan Jubb.	
540	Gwyn Parker	1933–34	Centre	Welsh centre signed from Huddersfield. Later played for Keighley.	
541	Stan Brogden	1933–34	Centre	International centre signed from Huddersfield. Also played for Bradford Northern and Hull. Father of George Brogden.	
542	Len Higson	1934–35	Prop	Signed from Wakefield Trinity and later played for Bradford Northern.	
543	Charlie Eaton	1934–35	Fullback	Understudy to Jim Brough played in two wartime Challenge Cup victories. later played for Batley.	
544	Kenneth Wensley	1934–35	Second row		
545	Richard A Brighton	1934–35	Hooker		
546	Cliff Whitehead	1934–35	Loose forward	Goalkicking forward signed from Hunslet. Also played for Batley and Bramley.	
547	Aubrey Casewell	1934–35	Second row	Welsh forward signed from Salford. Also played for Halifax and Keighley.	
548	Fred Harris	1934–35	Centre	Signed from Leigh	
549	Ronnie Richards	1934–35	Scrum half	Welsh rugby union scrum half signed from Swansea. Later played for York.	
550	John Hall	1935–36	Hooker	Signed from Batley	
551	Edgar Jones	1935–36	Prop	Welsh rugby union international signed from Swansea	
552	John Arthur Jones	1935–36	Stand off	Later played for Wakefield Trinity	
553	Harry Germaine	1935–36	Centre	Later played for Dewsbury	
554	Tom Hartley	1935–36	Hooker		
555	Walter Dyson	1935–36	Prop	Signed from Featherstone Rovers	
556	Ernest Ripley	1935–36	Second row		
557	Ernest Pollard	1936–37	Centre	Signed from Wakefield Trinity. Joined Bradford Northern after one season. Brother of Don Pollard.	
558	James Plimmer	1936–37	Hooker	Signed from Castleford	
559	Cliff Evans	1936–37	Scrum half	Welsh scrum half signed from Salford.	
560	Dai Prosser	1936–37	Prop	Welsh rugby union international prop signed from York. Later became Leeds coach.	
561	Ernest Whitehead	1936–37	Wing	Goalkicking wing joined Wakefield Trinity in 1938 but rejoined Leeds after the Second World War.	
562	Con Murphy	1936–37	Hooker	Welsh rugby union international signed from Streatham and Mitcham along with Dai Jenkins	
563	Dai Jenkins	1936–37	Scrum half	Welsh halfback signed from Streatham and Mitcham along with Con Murphy. Later played for Keighley.	
564	Ted Tattersfield	1936–37	Second row	Signed from Hull KR. Later played for Batley.	
565	William Duffy	1936–37	Loose forward	Later played for Hunslet and coached Wakefield in 1953–54 and later Bramley. Brother of Richard Patrick Duffy	
566	Vic Hey	1937–38	Stand off	Australian international signed from Ipswich after playing for Wests in Sydney.	
567	Harry Woods	1937–38	Prop	Signed from Liverpool Stanley and later played for Wigan	
568	Albert Place	1937–38	Wing	Also played for Featherstone Rovers	
569	Alf Watson	1937–38	Loose forward	Signed from Wakefield Trinity. Later played for Featherstone Rovers	
570	Cliff Carter	1937–38	Hooker	Signed from Wakefield Trinity. Later signed for Whitehaven.	
571	Frank Lingard	1938–39	Centre	Signed from Bramley and later played for Batley.	
572	Richard Patrick Duffy	1938–39	Second row	Brother of William Duffy	
573	Jack Kelly	1938–39	Fullback	Signed from rugby union. Guested for a number of clubs during the war and later signed for Dewsbury	
574	Reg Wheatley	1938–39	Prop	Signed from York. Returned to Leeds after a spell as a prisoner of war. Later joined Leigh.	
575	Jack Booth	1938–39	Second row	Later played for Wakefield Trinity	
576	William George Dennis	1938–39	Wing		
577	Gareth Price	1938–39	Centre	Welsh rugby union centre signed from Llanelli. Later played for Halifax.	
578	Idwal Davies	1938–39	Centre	Welsh international rugby union centre signed from Llanelli	
579	Dennis Madden	1938–39	Centre	Signed from Huddersfield	
580	Alfred Phillips	1938–39	Scrum half	Later played for Batley	
581	Edgar Blackburn	1938–39	Stand off	Signed from Batley. Son of Harry Blackburn	
582	Richard Cawtheray	1938–39	Hooker		
583	Oliver Morris	1939–40	Stand off	Welsh stand off signed from Hunslet. Died during the Second World War.	
584	Samuel Crossley	1939–40	Hooker		
585	Norman Hebb	1939–40	Second row	Later played for Bramley	
586	H.F. Jones	1939–40	Centre		
587	Harry Maltby	1939–40	Fullback	Brother Sam played for Batley and Bramley	
588	Basil Arthur Towler	1939–40	Prop		
589	Joe Ellis	1939–40	Second row	Guest from Dewsbury	
590	Ken Davies	1939–40	Stand off	Guest from Keighley	
591	George Harris	1939–40	Second row	Guest from Keighley	
592	Ray Hamer	1939–40	Stand off	Guest from Featherstone Rovers	
593	Reg Jukes	1939–40	Loose forward	Guest from Featherstone Rovers	
594	Bill Sherwood	1939–40	Second row	Guest from Featherstone Rovers	
595	Ivor Davies	1939–40	Centre	Guest from Dewsbury	
596	Alfred McManus	1939–40	Second row	Forward played one game for Castleford before joining Leeds and later Dewsbury. Also played as a guest for Wakefield Trinity.	
597	Jack Newbound	1939–40	Second row	Guest from Hunslet signed officially in 1945. Brother of Sam Newbound.	
598	Sam Newbound	1939–40	Second row	Guest from Hunslet. Brother of Jack Newbound.	
599	N Chapman	1939–40	Second row		
600	Eric Batten	1939–40	Wing	Guest from Hunslet. Son of Billy Batten and uncle of Ray Batten	
601	Bill Hudson	1939–40	Second row	Guest from Batley	
602	Cyril Morrell	1939–40	Centre	Guest from Hunslet	
603	Bryan Ewart Toothill	1939–40	Wing	Died during the Second World War	
604	Tom Walsh	1939–40	Scrum half	Guest from Castleford	
605	H Rhodes	1939–40	Centre		
606	H Ward	1939–40	Scrum half		
607	Des Foreman	1939–40	Second row	Later played for Castleford	
608	Bill Eddom	1940–41	Second row	Guest from Wakefield Trinity	
609	Ray Maskill	1940–41	Prop	Guest from Hull KR	
610	Smart	1940–41	Prop		
611	John Eastwood	1940–41	Wing	Guest from Hull KR	
612	Gus Risman	1940–41	Centre	Guest from Salford. Father of Bev Risman.	
613	Harold Edwards	1940–41	Second row	Guest from Bradford Northern	
614	R.L. Morgan	1940–41	Prop		
615	Dennis Warrior	1940–41	Centre	Later played for Bramley	
616	Len Blanchard	1940–41	Prop	Guest from Hull KR	
617	Thomas Pears	1940–41	Wing	Guest from Batley	
618	J Wilkinson	1940–41	Second row		
619	Tom Harrison	1940–41	Wing	Guest from Salford	
620	Patrick McManus	1940–41	Prop	Guest from Castleford	
621	James Ramsey	1940–41	Scrum half		
622	Edwin Billington	1940–41	Stand off	Guest from Bradford Northern	
623	Herbert Bowering	1940–41	Second row	Guest from Hull	
624	Harry Hammond	1940–41	Second row	Guest from Dewsbury	
625	George Morgan	1940–41	Second row	Guest from Dewsbury	
626	Bill Riley	1940–41	Prop	Guest from Liverpool Stanley	
627	Joe Rennard	1940–41	Scrum half	Guest from Castleford	
628	Joe Sedgwick	1940–41	Centre	Guest from Bramley	
629	Eddie Webb	1940–41	Second row	Guest from Bramley	
630	Richard Green	1940–41	Wing	Guest from Swinton	
631	John Morgan	1940–41	Second row	Guest from Huddersfield	
632	Denton Large	1940–41	Stand off		
633	Jack Street	1940–41	Second row	Guest from Castleford	
634	Jack Garrett	1940–41	Wing	Guest from Warrington	
635	K Giles	1940–41	Wing		
636	William "Benny" Pearson	1940–41	Second row	Guest from Bramley	
637	Eddie Bennett	1940–41	Prop	Guest from Hunslet	
638	Johnny Lawrenson	1940–41	Wing	Guest from Wigan	
639	Alec Ramsden	1941–42	Wing	Guest from Dewsbury	
640	Lawrence Roberts	1941–42	Prop	Guest from Bradford Northern	
641	Francis George Self	1941–42	Wing		
642	Griff Jenkins	1941–42	Stand off	Guest from Warrington	
643	Tom Kenny	1941–42	Loose forward	Guest from Salford	
644	Herbert Farrar	1941–42	Wing	Guest from Bramley	
645	William Hayes	1941–42	Scrum half	Guest from Bradford Northern	
646	N Higgins	1941–42	Fullback	Guest from Dewsbury	
647	Jack Miller	1941–42	Prop	Guest from Warrington	
648	Arthur Dexter	1941–42	Second row	Guest from Featherstone Rovers	
649	Mick Foley	1941–42	Prop	Guest from Batley	
650	E Sunderland	1941–42	Hooker	Guest from Keighley	
651	Charlie Seeling Jr	1941–42	Second row	Guest from Dewsbury	
652	Joe Desborough	1941–42	Second row	Guest from Bramley	
653	J McKenzie	1941–42	Centre	Guest from RAAF.	
654	Harold Taylor	1941–42	Fullback	Guest from Keighley	
655	A Fell (Note: Refers to an unnamed player whose sole appearance was at York on 29 November 1941. A soldier from the crowd volunteered to play when Leeds turned up a player short.)	1941–42	Wing	This is the supposed "soldier in the crowd" who jumped the fence to play for Leeds. Had previously played for Keighley.	
656	George Brown	1941–42	Second row	Guest from Batley	
657	Idris Towill	1941–42	Wing	Guest from Keighley	
658	Jack Bradbury	1941–42	Stand off	Guest from St Helens	
659	Ronnie Caress	1941–42	Centre	Guest from Wakefield Trinity	
660	Reg Jenkinson	1941–42	Wing	Guest from Wakefield Trinity	
661	Harry Murphy	1941–42	Loose forward	Guest from Wakefield Trinity	
662	Tony Frearson	1941–42	Wing	Guest from Hunslet	
663	Sammy Miller	1941–42	Fullback	Guest from Salford	
664	Jim Stott	1941–42	Centre	Guest from St Helens	
665	Peter Twist	1941–42	Centre	Guest from St Helens	
666	Leslie Llewellyn White	1941–42	Hooker	Guest from Hunslet	
667	Albany Longley	1941–42	Centre	Guest from Featherstone Rovers	
668	Percy Searles	1941–42	Scrum half	Guest from Featherstone Rovers	
669	J.T. Taylor	1941–42	Fullback	Guest from Bramley	
670	Walter Tennant	1941–42	Stand off	Guest from Featherstone Rovers	
671	George Cooper	1941–42	Wing	Guest from Bramley	
672	Tommy Taylor	1941–42	Prop	Guest from Castleford	
673	Harold Baker	1941–42	Second row	Guest from Oldham	
674	Fred Elson	1941–42	Loose forward	Guest from Oldham	
675	Charlie Glover	1941–42	Stand off	Guest from Wigan	
676	Francis Gregory	1941–42	Prop	Guest from Warrington	
677	John Ward	1941–42	Wing	Guest from Rochdale Hornets	
678	Jack Ogden	1941–42	Centre	Guest from Oldham	
679	James Croston	1941–42	Centre	Guest from Castleford	
680	John H Fox	1941–42	Second row	Guest from Castleford	
681	James Nicholls	1941–42	Second row	Guest from Castleford	
682	Alan Edwards	1941–42	Wing	Guest from Salford	
683	Eric Jones	1942–43	Loose forward	Guest from Castleford	
684	Stanley Moores	1942–43	Prop	Guest from Bramley	
685	Sid Rookes	1942–43	Centre	Guest from Hunslet	
686	Roland Bancroft	1942–43	Prop	Guest from Bramley	
687	Billy Thompson	1942–43	Prop	Guest from Hunslet	
688	Billy Thornton	1942–43	Scrum half	Guest from Hunslet	
689	Jack Walkington	1942–43	Fullback	Guest from Hunslet	
690	Eddie Murphy	1942–43	Second row	Guest from Bramley. Brother of Dennis Murphy	
691	Whitham	1942–43	Hooker	Guest from Batley	
692	William Wood	1942–43	Wing	Guest from Dewsbury	
693	Cyril Plenderleith	1942–43	Second row	Guest from Hunslet	
694	Jack Whincup	1942–43	Wing	Guest from Hunslet	
695	Cyril Callaghan	1942–43	Wing		
696	Joe Britton	1942–43	Hooker	Guest from Hunslet	
697	Hudson Irving	1942–43	Prop	Guest from Halifax	
698	William Thomas Davies	1942–43	Centre	Guest from Huddersfield	
699	Frank Lees	1942–43	Centre	Guest from Oldham	
700	Arthur Childs	1942–43	Second row	Guest from Halifax	
701	F Oakley	1942–43	Stand off	Guest from Sale rugby union	
702	Bernard Gray	1943–44	Stand off		
703	Ike Owens	1943–44	Loose forward	Welsh forward signed from Maesteg. Also played for Castleford and Huddersfield.	
704	Walter Dockar	1943–44	Wing	Guest from Hull	
705	Dennis Murphy	1943–44	Second row	Guest from Bramley signed officially after the war. Brother of Eddie Murphy.	
706	John Kane	1943–44	Stand off	Guest from Dewsbury	
707	F Mardy	1943–44	Centre		
708	Tommy Cornelius	1943–44	Centre	Welsh centre later played for Whitehaven	
709	Haigh	1943–44	Centre		
710	Harold Riley Betts	1943–44	Second row	Rugby union player stationed in West Riding	
711	A Jones	1943–44	Wing	Rugby union player stationed in West Riding	
712	W.E. Jones	1943–44	Stand off		
713	Norman Pugh	1943–44	Second row	Guest from Oldham	
714	Lewis Rees	1943–44	Prop	Guest from Oldham	
715	Harold Whitehead	1943–44	Prop	Guest from Oldham	
716	Howard Burt	1943–44	Stand off	Rugby union serviceman from RAF Ringway. Later played for Salford.	
717	C Crowther	1943–44	Wing	Rugby union serviceman from RAF Ringway.	
718	Harry Dagnan	1943–44	Wing	Guest from Salford	
719	Dai Rees	1943–44	Stand off	Rugby union RAF serviceman later signed for Oldham. Leeds incorrectly identified this as a different player from 769	
720	Daniel Sheehy	1943–44	Wing	Welsh wing later played for Dewsbury	
721	John Terry	1943–44	Second row	Guest from Batley	
722	George Brogden	1943–44	Wing	Son of Stan Brogden	
723	C Kaye	1943–44	Scrum half		
724	Alan Flowers	1943–44	Second row	Guest from Wakefield Trinity	
725	R.E. Hodgson	1943–44	Prop	Guest from York	
726	George Jepson	1943–44	Stand off	Guest from Wakefield Trinity	
727	Arthur Staniland	1943–44	Wing	Later played for Castleford. Father of Andrew Staniland	
728	Walter Wardle	1943–44	Scrum half		
729	Harry Wilkinson	1943–44	Prop	Guest from Wakefield Trinity	
730	Lou Davies	1943–44	Stand off	Guest from Batley/York	
731	Ernie Herbert	1943–44	Scrum half	Guest from Hull	
732	George Nicholson	1943–44	Hooker	Guest from Dewsbury	
733	Ken Brookes	1943–44	Wing	Guest from Wakefield Trinity	
734	Ronnie Copley	1943–44	Wing	Guest from Wakefield Trinity	
735	Roy Goddard	1943–44	Scrum half	Guest from Hunslet	
736	Edwin "Sandy" Orford	1943–44	Second row	Guest from Wakefield Trinity	
737	Ron Rylance	1943–44	Centre	Guest from Wakefield Trinity	
738	George Bunter	1943–44	Second row	Guest from Broughton Rangers	
739	L Morgan	1943–44	Second row	Guest from rugby union	
740	Ted Beesley	1943–44	Second row	Guest from Barrow	
741	Danny Hartley	1943–44	Second row	Guest from Dewsbury	
742	George Kershaw	1943–44	Second row	Guest from Dewsbury	
743	Jimmy Ledgard	1943–44	Fullback	Fullback triallist went on to become one of the game's top pointscorers with Leigh.	
744	James Burness	1943–44	Centre		
745	T Sterry	1943–44	Second row		
746	John Russell Dixon	1943–44	Centre	RAAF and GPS rugby union (Brisbane). Died in plane crash along with John Roper.	
747	John Roper	1943–44	Second row	RAAF and Randwick rugby union (Sydney). Died in plane crash along with John Dixon	
748	-	-	-	Leeds have erroneously identified this as "Ladis Davies" – it is Lou Davies (#730). "Ladis" is not a name.	
749	Norman Guest	1943–44	Centre	Guest from Castleford	
750	Frank Hemingway	1943–44	Prop	Guest from Featherstone Rovers	
751	Jack Higgins	1943–44	Scrum half	Guest from Featherstone Rovers	
752	Lewie Beaumont	1944–45	Second row	Guest from Hull KR	
753	Ernest McWatt	1944–45	Centre	Guest from Hull KR. Brother of Wilf McWatt	
754	Walter Ness	1944–45	Stand off	Guest from Hull KR	
755	Hector Gee	1944–45	Scrum half	Australian scrum half signed from Wigan. Later played for Batley.	
756	Harry Jones	1944–45	Prop	Guest from Warrington	
757	Les Jones	1944–45	Fullback	Guest from Warrington	
758	C Boxall	1944–45	Prop		
759	Eric Hesketh	1944–45	Stand off	Signed from Wigan. Later played for Batley.	
760	Wilfred McWatt	1944–45	Centre	Guest from Hull KR. Brother of Ernest McWatt.	
761	Fred Scott	1944–45	Second row	From Barrow District. Played for Barrow after the war.	
762	Stanley Sparkes	1944–45	Prop	Guest from Batley	
763	B Williams	1944–45	Fullback	Welsh triallist	
764	Joe Flanagan	1944–45	Second row	Guest from Keighley later signed officially	
765	W Nicholson	1944–45	Wing		
766	Robert Spruce	1944–45	Second row	Guest from Swinton	
767	Ron Thatcher	1944–45	Stand off	Welsh triallist	
768	Bob France	1944–45	Centre	Guest from Batley	
769	-	-	-	Leeds have as Dai Rees of Oldham. This is a repeat of 719.	
770	Walter Cussans	1944–45	Fullback		
771	Tommy Holland	1944–45	Stand off	Guest from Swinton	
772	Stan Ayres	1944–45	Second row	Guest from Barrow	
773	Vince Doughty	1944–45	Wing	Guest from Wigan	
774	Bob Joel	1944–45	Second row	Guest from Barrow District. Later played for Rochdale Hornets.	
775	Dicky Williams	1944–45	Stand off	Welsh stand off signed from Bristol rugby union. Later played for Hunslet.	
776	K Baker	1944–45	Wing	Guest from Batley	
777	John Hickey	1944–45	Second row	Welsh triallist	
778	Ernie Lawrence	1944–45	Centre	Guest from Hull	
779	Jack Taylor	1944–45	Wing	Guest from Wigan	
780	Kenneth Bell	1944–45	Wing		
781	George Benson	1944–45	Second row	Guest from Barrow district	
782	Emlyn Richards	1944–45	Centre	Welsh rugby union centre later played for Hull KR	
783	Walter Best	1944–45	Wing	Guest from Bradford Northern. Signed officially after the war.	
784	George Carmichael	1944–45	Fullback	Guest from Bradford Northern.	
785	Harold Caldwell	1944–45	Wing	Guest from Keighley	
786	Dave Cotton	1944–45	Hooker	Guest from Warrington	
787	Alf Burnell	1944–45	Scrum half	Guest from Hunslet	
788	Des Clarkson	1944–45	Second row	Guest from Hunslet. Signed for Leeds after the war.	
789	J Martin	1944–45	Wing	Guest from RAAF	
790	Vince McKeating	1944–45	Hooker	Hooker later played for Workington and Barrow	
791	P Stephenson	1944–45	Wing		
792	Ken Traill	1944–45	Loose forward	Guest from Hunslet	
793	J Cox	1944–45	Wing	Guest from RAAF	
794	Paddy O'Donell	1944–45	Wing	Guest from Widnes	
795	A Evans	1944–45	Second row		
796	Longman	1944–45	Prop		
797	Mick Roberts	1944–45	Wing	Guest from Widnes	
798	Norman Thompson	1944–45	Prop	Guest from St Helens	
799	Reg Brightmore	1944–45	Wing	Guest from Featherstone Rovers	
800	Greenwood	1944–45	Loose forward		
801	Herbert Wright	1944–45	Second row	Guest from Featherstone Rovers	
802	C Whiteley	1945–46	Fullback		
803	Jack Rogers	1945–46	Fullback	Debut aged 16. Later played for Salford, Oldham and Bramley	
804	Les Tate	1945–46	Wing	Later played for Oldham	
805	Jim Davies	1945–46	Wing	Guest from Widnes	
806	Thomas Keen	1945–46	Scrum half	Played for Barrow A and played a trial game for Leeds in September 1945 before he was called up into the RAF where he excelled at rugby union for 3 years. Demobbed in 1948, 2 months later joined Whitehaven and made his debut in Feb 1949 and went on to be a mainstay of the Whitehaven team.	
807	Stan Tompkinson	1945–46	Centre	Guest from Barrow	
808	W Wilson	1945–46	Second row	Guest from Barrow	
809	Woosner	1945–46	Stand off		
810	S Carter	1945–46	Hooker		
811	Cleaver	1945–46	Fullback	Guest from RAF Ringway	
812	Johnny Feather	1945–46	Scrum half	Later played for Oldham. Uncle of John Holmes and Phil Holmes	
813	R Hinchcliffe	1945–46	Centre		
814	Hutchins	1945–46	Wing	Guest from RAF Ringway	
815	Robert Batten	1945–46	Centre	Later played for Oldham. Son of Billy and Brother of Eric.	
816	A Buckley	1945–46	Second row		
817	Charles Waters	1945–46	Second row	Born in Askem (Cumberland) in 1920 played 13 times for Leeds in 1945–46 then for Dewsbury. in 1946–47 season he played for Batley. Played a few wartimes games for barrow as well but never officially signed for them.	
818	Thomas Bowron	1945–46	Wing	Guest from Barrow District	
819	Hubert Lockwood	1945–46	Fullback	Loan signing from Halifax	
820	William Vernon Morgan	1945–46	Wing		
821	D Branch	1945–46	Second row		
822	William Metcalfe	1945–46	Centre	Later played for Hunslet	
823	H Tipton	1945–46	Fullback		
824	R Bedford	1945–46	Wing		
825	George Vernon Hughes	1945–46	Second row	Welsh forward later played for Wakefield Trinity, Huddersfield, Leigh and Liverpool City	
826	I.J. Evans	1945–46	Stand off		
827	N. H. Fitton	1945–46	Fullback		
828	Alan Horsfall	1945–46	Hooker	Later played for Castleford	
829	A Roberts	1945–46	Prop		
830	Vincent Dilorenzo	1945–46	Hooker	Loan signing from Bradford Northern	
831	E Lane	1945–46	Wing		
832	K Watkins	1945–46	Fullback		
833	Billy Banks	1945–46	Scrum half	Welsh rugby union halfback signed from Maesteg. Also played for Wakefield Trinity, Huddersfield, Whitehaven and Salford	
834	Denis Chalkley	1945–46	Fullback		
835	Wilf Cox	1945–46	Centre		
836	Thomas Leslie Williams	1946–47	Centre	Welsh rugby union centre signed from Newport. Also played for Doncaster	
837	George T Swaine	1946–47	Second row		
838	Jim Tynan	1946–47	Scrum half	Later played for Oldham	
839	Chris Brereton	1946–47	Prop	Signed from Halifax. Later joined Keighley	
840	Bert E Cook	1946–47	Full back	Kiwi fullback signed from NZ armed forces rugby union team. Later played for Keighley	
841	Arthur Clues	1946–47	Second row	Australian international forward signed from Wests. Later joined Hunslet.	
842	Joe Hulme	1947–48	Second row	Later played for Bramley	
843	Len Kenny	1947–48	Wing	Australian winger	
844	William George Jones	1945–46	Prop	Guest from Newport rugby union debuted against Bradford 15 Sep 1945. Leeds originally missed this player	
845	Norman Davies	1947–48	Hooker	Welsh hooker signed from rugby union	
846	Edward "Ginger" Downes	1947–48	Scrum half		
847	Ted Verrenkamp	1947–48	Centre	Australian utility-back later played for Keighley.	
848	Maurice Ogden	1947–48	Second row	Later played for Featherstone Rovers	
849	Jacobus Pansegruow	1947–48	Second row	South African forward later played for Halifax	
850	Ken Kearney	1948–49	Hooker	Australian rugby union international played for Leeds until 1951 when he joined St George.	
851	Bob McMaster	1948–49	Prop	Australian rugby union international	
852	Drew Turnbull	1948–49	Wing	Scottish wing signed from Hawick rugby union. Later joined Halifax.	
853	Thomas Wright	1948–49	Wing	Scottish international wing signed from Hawick.	
854	Les Thomas	1948–49	Second row	Signed from Oldham	
855	Alan Kendrick	1948–49	Second row	Later played for Castleford	
856	Friend Taylor	1948–49	Fullback	Signed from Oldham	
857	Gwyn Gronow	1948–49	Prop	Signed from Hunslet. Later played for Doncaster.	
858	Ike Proctor	1948–49	Centre	Signed from Halifax. later joined Warrington.	
859	Bob Bartlett	1948–49	Centre	Australian centre signed from Bramley	
860	John L Haynes	1948–49	Wing		
861	Tom Lane	1948–49	Second row	Signed from Hunslet	
862	W Smith	1948–49	Loose forward		
863	Lawrence Ganley	1949–50	Wing		
864	Frank Watson	1949–50	Scrum half	Signed from Hunslet. Later joined Batley	
865	Eric Battersby	1949–50	Hooker	Later played for St Helens	
866	Ronald O'Farrell	1949–50	Wing		
867	Bill Hopper	1949–50	Prop	Signed from Warrington. Later joined Dewsbury	
868	Gordon Brown	1949–50	Centre	World Cup winner 1954	
869	Bruce Ryan	1950–51	Wing	Australian wing signed from Hull	
870	Bernard Poole	1950–51	Second row	Signed from Hull. Later joined York.	
871	Vernon Grace	1950–51	Fullback	Later joined York	
872	Dennis Nutting	1950–51	Prop	Signed from Wakefield Trinity	
873	Clarence Weaver	1950–51	Scrum half		
874	Walt J Smith	1950–51	Prop	Is this the same player as "W Smith" (#862)?	
875	Geoff Moore	1951–52	Loose forward	Signed from Bradford Northern. Later played for Dewsbury.	
876	Arthur Wood	1951–52	Prop	Signed from Featherstone Rovers. Later joined Bramley.	
877	Ken Ward	1951–52	Stand off	Signed from Oldham. Later joined Doncaster.	
878	Jim Dunn	1951–52	Fullback		
879	Jerry Garbutt	1951–52	Wing	Later played for Bramley	
880	Dennis Scholes	1951–52	Wing	Signed from Hull KR. Later played for Featherstone Rovers.	
881	Harold Oddy	1951–52	Centre	Later played for Castleford	
882	Keith McLellan	1951–52	Centre	Signed from Australian rugby union. Went on to captain Leeds in the 1957 Challenge Cup win.	
883	Dave Bennett	1951–52	Scrum half	Signed from Bramley, where he played from 1946–47 to 1951–52. Previously at Bradford for the 1945–46 season	
884	Bernard Prior	1951–52	Hooker	Later played for Hunslet	
885	Dudley Reyner	1951–52	Wing		
886	Billy Pratt	1951–52	Scrum half	Later played for Halifax	
887	Jeff Stevenson	1951–52	Scrum half	Signed from rugby union. Later joined York	
888	Alec Dick	1951–52	Loose forward	Later played for Batley. Father of Kevin Dick	
889	Phillip Shillitoe	1952–53	Prop		
890	Terry Whitehead	1952–53	Wing		
891	Bill Woodhead	1952–53	Fullback	From Fox Rovers in the Leeds league. Later joined Bramley	
892	Elwyn Gwyther	1952–53	Prop	Welsh prop signed from Belle Vue Rangers	
893	Tom Lynn	1952–53	Wing	Signed from Hunslet Boys Club	
894	Ralph Morgan	1952–53	Fullback	Signed from Swinton	
895 (Note: Separate references on the Rhinos' website differ. Some list Jones' heritage number as 895, others as 896.)	Lewis Jones	1952–53	Centre	Welsh rugby union international broke multiple scoring records with Leeds.	
896	George Broughton Jnr (Note: Separate references on the Rhinos' website differ. Some list Jones as heritage number 896, others list Broughton Jnr.)	1952–53	Wing	Wing signed from Castleford. Son of George Broughton and uncle of John Atkinson	
897	Frank Bowers	1952–53	Loose forward		
898	Billy Blan	1953–54	Loose forward	Signed from Wigan. Later joined St Helens.	
899	Clifford Last	1953–54	Loose forward	Later joined Hull KR	
900	Jack Lendill	1953–54	Stand off	Brother of Peter Lendill.	
901	Tom Shirtliffe	1953–54	Second row	Signed from Batley	
902	Gordon Parker	1953–54	Wing		
903	Bill Hanson	1953–54	Second row		
904	Tony Skelton	1953–54	Prop		
905	Alan Bartle	1953–54	Wing		
906	John Sewell	1954–55	Second row	Later played for Keighley	
907	Derek Wilkinson	1954–55	Wing	Signed from Doncaster	
908	David Rose	1954–55	Wing	Scottish rugby union international signed from Huddersfield	
909	Joe Anderson	1954–55	Prop	Signed from Castleford. Later joined Featherstone Rovers	
910	Colin Wilkinson	1954–55	Second row		
911	Peter Umpleby	1954–55	Second row	Later joined Castleford	
912	Peter Lendill	1955–56	Fullback	Later joined Salford. Brother of Jack Lendill	
913	Vic Fuller	1955–56	Prop		
914	Fred Smith	1955–56	Wing	Joined Wakefield.	
915	Colin Tomlinson	1955–56	Second row	Signed from Bramley	
916	Harry Street	1955–56	Loose forward	Signed from Wigan. Later joined Featherstone Rovers	
917	Barry Charlesworth	1955–56	Wing	Later joined Featherstone Rovers.	
918	Don Robinson	1955–56	Second row	Signed from Wakefield Trinity. Later joined Doncaster	
919	Del Hodgkinson	1955–56	Wing		
920	Pat Quinn	1956–57	Fullback	England rugby union international. Later joined Wigan.	
921	Don Gullick	1956–57	Centre	Welsh centre signed from Leigh	
922	George Richardson	1956–57	Wing		
923	Malcolm Davies	1956–57	Wing	Welsh wing signed from Bradford Northern	
924	Les Belshaw	1956–57	Prop	Signed from Bradford Northern	
925	Alvin Kirkland	1957–58	Wing	American wing also played for Parramatta	
926	Trevor Whitehead	1957–58	Prop	Originally a centre from rugby union moved into the forwards. Later joined Hull. Father of Paul Whitehead	
927	Gary Hemingway	1957–58	Wing	Wing signed from rugby union	
928	Walter Garside	1957–58	Wing	Later joined Bramley	
929	Barry Simms	1957–58	Hooker		
930	Ron Murray	1957–58	Second row	Scottish forward signed from rugby union	
931	Fred Ward	1957–58	Second row	Signed from Castleford. Later joined Keighley.	
932	Stanley Dodds	1957–58	Prop	Previously played for Hunslet	
933	Mick Pratt	1957–58	Prop		
934	Erie Deysel	1958–59	Wing	Triallist from Rhodesia. Brother of Ossie Deysel	
935	Alan Jubb	1958–59	Second row	Son of Ken Jubb later joined Bramley	
936	Ossie Deysel	1958–59	Wing	Triallist from Rhodesia. Brother of Ernie Deysel	
937	Jim Hainsworth	1958–59	Prop	Signed from Batley	
938	Jack Pycroft	1958–59	Scrum half	Later joined Oldham	
939	Derek Hallas	1958–59	Centre	Signed from Keighley. Also played for Parramatta.	
940	Michael Hinch	1958–59	Scrum half		
941	Russell Robins	1958–59	Second row	Welsh rugby union international signed from Pontypridd	
942	Wilf Rosenberg	1958–59	Wing	South African rugby union international. Later played for Hull.	
943	Vince Hattee	1959–60	Centre	Later played for Doncaster	
944	Fred Pickup	1959–60	Centre	Also played for Manly, Parramatta and Hunslet	
945	Eric Horsman	1959–60	Stand off	Later joined Doncaster	
946	Peter Parker	1959–60	Centre	Later joined Oldham	
947	Dennis Goodwin	1959–60	Second row	Signed from Barrow. Later joined York	
948	Eddie Ratcliffe	1959–60	Wing		
949	Paul Stacey	1959–60	Loose forward		
950	Jack Fairbank	1959–60	Second row	Signed from Huddersfield. Father of John Fairbank	
951	David Johnson	1959–60	Wing	Later joined Hull	
952	Colin Evans	1959–60	Scrum half	Welsh rugby union international signed from Pontypool. Later played for York and Keighley.	
953	Ken Thornett	1959–60	Fullback	Australian rugby union fullback later joined Parramatta	
954	Mike Cadywold	1960–61	Wing		
955	Vic Sawyer	1960–61	Stand off	Signed from South African rugby union. Returned to SA after one game.	
956	Jack Brook	1960–61	Wing	Signed from Batley	
957	Trevor Oldroyd	1960–61	Stand off	Later played for Batley	
958	Brian Shaw	1960–61	Loose forward	Signed from Hunslet	
959	Geoff Wriglesworth	1961–62	Wing	Later played for Bradford Northern, Hull KR and Wakefield Trinity	
960	George Simpson	1961–62	Fullback	Later played for Bramley	
961	John Sykes	1961–62	Second row	Later played for Bradford Northern	
962	Louis Neumann	1961–62	Second row	South African forward later played for Easts	
963	Derek Davies	1961–62	Stand off	Signed from Bradford Northern. Later joined Hull.	
964	Abe Terry	1961–62	Prop	Signed from St Helens. Later joined Featherstone Rovers	
965	Robin Dewhurst	1961–62	Fullback	Later played for Bramley and coached Leeds in the 1980s.	
966	Mick Shoebottom	1961–62	Stand off	Leeds junior. Career ended early by injury.	
967	Gilbert Ashton	1961–62	Second row	Later played for Bradford Northern	
968	David Walker	1961–62	Second row	Later joined Keighley	
969	Brian Sadler	1961–62	Second row	Signed from junior rugby and from the Normanton area. Emigrated to Australia in the spring of 1965	
970	Graham Charlesworth	1961–62	Hooker	Later played for Hull.	
971	Alan Smith	1962–63	Wing	Finished as third highest tryscorer in Leeds history	
972	Alan Rees	1962–63	Stand off	Welsh rugby union international signed from Maesteg	
973	Ron Cowan	1962–63	Wing	Scottish rugby union international signed from Selkirk. Later played for Hull.	
974	Don Devereux	1962–63	Second row	Welsh rugby union international second row signed from Huddersfield	
975	Mick Joyce	1962–63	Prop		
976	John Davies	1962–63	Second row	Welsh rugby union international signed from Llanelli. Later played for Dewsbury and died aged just 28.	
977	Dennis "Des" Burke	1962–63	Centre	Australian centre played for Norths	
978	Mike Creary	1962–63	Wing	Teacher from Huddersfield	
979	Barry Seabourne	1962–63	Scrum half	Later played for Bradford Northern	
980	Dennis Toohey	1962–63	Wing	Later played for Bramley	
981	Andrew Broatch	1963–64	Centre	Scottish rugby union flyhalf signed from Hawick	
982	Alan Lockwood	1963–64	Hooker	Signed from Hull KR	
983	Mick Clark	1963–64	Prop	Signed from Salford	
984	Ray Batten	1963–64	Second row	Grandson of Billy Batten	
985	Jack Thomas	1963–64	Prop	Later played for Doncaster	
986	David Hartley	1963–64	Wing	Later played for Featherstone Rovers	
987	Les Chamberlain	1963–64	Second row	Signed from Hull KR	
988	Bill Drake	1963–64	Second row	Signed from Hull. Later joined York	
989	Peter McVeigh	1963–64	Second row	Signed from Batley. Later joined Hull.	
990	Dick Gemmell	1963–64	Centre	Signed from Hull	
991	Ernest Towler	1963–64	Prop	Later joined Bramley	
992	Ron Morgan	1964–65	Second row	Welsh forward signed from Swinton. Later joined Hull.	
993	Robert Smith	1964–65	Stand off		
994	Albert Firth	1964–65	Second row	Signed from York	
995	Bob Landers	1964–65	Wing	Australia wing played for Easts and Penrith	
996	Alf Meakin	1964–65	Wing	International sprinter had brief trial with Leeds.	
997	David Hick	1964–65	Wing	Utility back played in multiple finals with Leeds. Later joined Hull KR.	
998	Peter Astbury	1964–65	Hooker	Later played for Bramley	
999	Stewart Coulthard	1964–65	Second row		
1000	Syd Hynes	1964–65	Centre	Became captain and later coach of Leeds.	
1001	Ken Rollin	1965–66	Scrum half	Signed from Wakefield Trinity	
1002	Harry Poole	1965–66	Loose forward	Signed from Hull KR. Later joined Hunslet	
1003	Michael Broom	1965–66	Fullback		
1004	Bev Risman	1965–66	Fullback	England rugby union international signed from Leigh. Son of Gus Risman.	
1005	Peter Moscatt	1965–66	Hooker	Later played for Easts	
1006	Bernard Watson	1965–66	Centre	Later played for Bradford Northern, hull KR and Dewsbury	
1007	John Atkinson	1965–66	Wing	Second highest tryscorer in Leeds history.	
1008	John Langley	1966–67	Centre	Later played for Dewsbury	
1009	Ken Eyre	1966–67	Prop	Signed from Hunslet. Later joined Keighley. Brother of Albert Eyre.	
1010	Ted Barnard	1966–67	Prop	Later joined Hull KR	
1011	Peter Fozzard	1966–67	Second row	Father of Nick Fozzard	
1012	Phil Sunderland	1966–67	Second row		
1013	Frank Brown	1966–67	Centre	Later played for Wakefield Trinity	
1014	Tony Crosby	1966–67	Hooker	Signed from York. Later joined Hull KR.	
1015	Albert Eyre	1967–68	Second row	Signed from Keighley. Brother of Ken Eyre.	
1016	Chris Fawdington	1967–68	Scrum half	Later joined Keighley	
1017	John Burke	1967–68	Prop	Later joined Keighley	
1018	Bob Coverley	1967–68	Hooker	Played for both Hull and Hull KR	
1019	Bill Ramsey	1967–68	Second row	Signed from Hunslet. Also played for Bradford Northern and Widnes.	
1020	Mick Leadbetter	1967–68	Second row		
1021	Harry Beverley	1967–68	Prop	Later played for Dewsbury, Workington and Fulham	
1022	John Holmes	1968–69	Stand off	Record 625 appearances for Leeds from 1968 to 1989. Brother of Phil Holmes and nephew of Johnny Feather	
1023	Ray Handscombe	1968–69	Hooker	Later played for Wakefield Trinity and Featherstone Rovers	
1024	George Shepherd	1968–69	Hooker	Signed from Wakefield Trinity	
1025	Phil Holmes	1968–69	Wing	Later played for Batley. Brother of John Holmes and nephew of Johnny Feather.	
1026	Mick Lamb	1968–69	Centre	Signed from rugby union. Later joined Bradford Northern	
1027	Phil Cookson	1968–69	Second row	First forward to score over 100 tries for Leeds.	
1028	Graham Eccles	1968–69	Second row	Almost 400 games for Leeds before joining Wakefield Trinity	
1029	Trevor Briggs	1969–70	Centre	Also played for Bramley	
1030	Peter Dunn	1969–70	Hooker	Signed from Hunslet. Also played for Bradford Northern.	
1031	Bob Haigh	1969–70	Loose forward	Signed from Wakefield Trinity. Broke season try record for a forward with 40 in 1970–71.	
1032	Steve Pitchford	1969–70	Prop	Lance Todd Trophy winner 1977. Also played for Bramley.	
1033	Barry Parker	1970–71	Wing	Later joined Wakefield Trinity	
1034	Alan Bence	1970–71	Second row	Later joined Wigan	
1035	Tony Wainwright	1970–71	Stand off	Later joined Oldham	
1036	Les Dyl	1970–71	Centre	Played for Bramley at end of career	
1037	Tony Fisher	1970–71	Hooker	Welsh hooker/prop signed from Bradford Northern	
1038	Neil Goodwin	1970–71	Second row		
1039	Alan Preece	1970–71	Second row	Signed from Hunslet	
1040	Alan Hardisty	1971–72	Stand off	Signed from Castleford	
1041	David Ward	1971–72	Hooker	Long-serving Leeds captain and later returned as coach. Father of Danny Ward.	
1042	Chris Sanderson	1971–72	Scrum half	Died following injury at Salford in 1977 a week before the Challenge Cup Final	
1043	David Barham	1971–72	Scrum half	Reserve halfback played in the 1971 Championship final	
1044	George Claughton	1971–72	Wing	Signed for Castleford	
1045	Keith Hepworth	1971–72	Scrum half	Signed from Castleford. Later played for Hull and Bramley	
1046	Terry Clawson	1971–72	Prop	Goalkicking prop signed from Hull KR. Later joined Oldham	
1047	Brian Hughes	1971–72	Second row	Later joined Oldham	
1048	David Jeanes	1972–73	Prop	International prop signed from Wakefield Trinity	
1049	Geoff Nicholls	1972–73	Fullback	Signed from Barrow. Later joined Hunslet.	
1050	John Hay	1972–73	Fullback	Signed from Featherstone Rovers. Later joined Bramley.	
1051	Geoff Clarkson	1972–73	Prop	Signed from Warrington. Later joined York in career spanning multiple clubs.	
1052	Derek Edwards	1972–73	Stand off	Signed from Castleford. Later joined Keighley	
1053	Derek Parker	1973–74	Second row	Later joined Bramley	
1054	John Ward	1973–74	Prop	Signed from Salford	
1055	David Marshall	1973–74	Fullback	Signed from Hunslet. Later joined Hull	
1056	Phil Sanderson	1973–74	Loose forward	Signed from Hunslet	
1057	Stephen Cooper	1973–74	Second row	Later joined York	
1058	Bryan Murrell	1973–74	Fullback	Later joined Hunslet. Father of Scott Murrell	
1059	Kevin Coussons	1973–74	Scrum half		
1060	Paul Fletcher	1973–74	Centre	Later joined Bramley	
1061	Roy Dickinson	1973–74	Prop	Later joined Halifax	
1062	Bryan Adams	1973–74	Second row	Utility later joined Wakefield Trinity	
1063	Steve Dickens	1973–74	Second row		
1064	John Hutchinson	1973–74	Hooker	Previously played for Batley	
1065	Merv Hicks	1973–74	Second row	Welsh forward signed from Hull. Later joined Bradford Northern	
1066	Mick Harrison	1974–75	Prop	Signed from Hull	
1067	David Jenkins	1974–75	Stand off	Welsh triallist later joined Widnes	
1068	Brendan White	1974–75	Second row	Later joined York	
1069	Neil Hague	1974–75	Centre	Played in all back positions for Leeds. Later joined Halifax. Uncle of Anthony and David Gibbons.	
1070	Gordon McHugh	1974–75	Second row	Later joined Huddersfield	
1071	Mel Mason	1974–75	Stand off	Signed from Featherstone Rovers. Later joined Barrow.	
1072	Derek Howard	1974–75	Wing	Later joined Bradford Northern	
1073	Ian Payne	1974–75	Hooker	Signed from York. Later joined Hunslet.	
1074	Kevin Dick	1975–76	Scrum half	Also played for Hull, Halifax and Huddersfield. Son of Alec Dick	
1075	Peter Banner	1976–77	Scrum half	Signed from Featherstone Rovers	
1076	David Smith	1976–77	Wing	Signed from Wakefield Trinity. Later joined Bradford Northern	
1077	Sean Miller	1976–77	Hooker	Later joined Carlisle	
1078	Chris Burton	1976–77	Second row	Later played for Huddersfield, Hull KR and Featherstone Rovers	
1079	Peter Harrison	1976–77	Prop		
1080	Stan Fearnley	1976–77	Loose forward	Signed from Bradford Northern	
1081	Dave Heron	1976–77	Loose forward	Later joined Bradford Northern. Brother of Wayne Heron	
1082	Tim Wilby	1976–77	Centre	Later joined Hull	
1083	Stuart Johnston	1976–77	Wing	Later joined Bramley	
1084	Willie Oulton	1976–77	Fullback	Signed from Wakefield Trinity	
1085	David Treasure	1977–78	Scrum half	Signed from Oldham. Later joined Keighley	
1086	John "Sammy" Sanderson	1977–78	Scrum half	Signed from Wakefield Trinity. Later joined Hull KR.	
1087	Chris Gibson	1977–78	Centre	Signed from rugby union and later joined York	
1088	Mick Crane	1977–78	Loose forward	Signed from Hull. Also played for Hull KR	
1089	Nigel Whitehouse	1977–78	Hooker	Later joined Halifax	
1090	Tony Binder	1977–78	Fullback	Later joined Carlisle	
1091	John Carroll	1977–78	Loose forward	Later played for Batley, Halifax and Hull	
1092	Ricky Winterbottom	1977–78	Wing	Later played for Bramley and Batley	
1093	Gary Hetherington	1978–79	Hooker	Goalkicking forward signed from York. later founded Sheffield Eagles and returned to Leeds as CEO	
1094	Neil Lean	1978–79	Prop	Later joined Hunslet	
1095	Graham Joyce	1978–79	Second row	Signed from Bradford Northern	
1096	Ian Slater	1978–79	Stand off	Signed from Bradford Northern	
1097	Eddie Cunningham	1979–80	Centre	Signed from St Helens and later joined Widnes.	
1098	Maurice Lucas	1979–80	Prop	Later played for Carlisle	
1099	Terry Naylor	1980–81	Wing		
1100	Keith Rayne	1980–81	Prop	Signed from Wakefield Trinity	
1101	Wayne Heron	1980–81	Second row	Later joined Kent Invicta and Bradford Northern. Brother of Dave Heron.	
1102	Mark Massa	1980–81	Wing	Later joined Featherstone Rovers	
1103	Dave Heselwood	1980–81	Centre	Signed from rugby union. Later joined Barrow.	
1104	Jeff Townend	1980–81	Prop	Signed from Wigan and later joined York	
1105	Ian Wilkinson	1980–81	Fullback	Centre turned fullback later joined Halifax and Bradford Northern	
1106	Andy Mackintosh	1980–81	Stand off	Later joined Featherstone Rovers. Brother of Ian Mackintosh	
1107	John McNeill	1980–81	Hooker	Signed from Featherstone Rovers	
1108	Ian Mackintosh	1980–81	Scrum half	Forced to retire due to injury. Brother of Andy Mackintosh	
1109	Peter Lister	1980–81	Stand off	Later joined Batley	
1110	Andy Sykes	1980–81	Prop	Later joined Barrow	
1111	Tony Burke	1981–82	Prop	Signed from Bramley. Joined St Helens in exchange for Gary Moorby and later played for Warrington.	
1112	Kevin Rayne	1981–82	Prop	Signed from Wakefield Trinity. Brother of Keith Rayne.	
1113	Graham Brearley	1981–82	Wing	Later joined Huddersfield	
1114	Mark Campbell	1981–82	Wing	Later played for Sheffield Eagles	
1115	Andy Smith	1981–82	Wing	Signed from rugby union	
1116	Mark Conway	1982–83	Scrum half	Debuted aged 17. Later joined Wakefield Trinity.	
1117	Colin Cooper	1982–83	Wing		
1118	Russ Sowden	1982–83	Hooker	Signed from Halifax	
1119	Paul Gill	1982–83	Fullback	BARLA international fullback	
1120	Kevin Squire	1982–83	Second row	Signed from Barnstaple rugby union. Forced to retire through illness.	
1121	Des Armitage	1982–83	Second row		
1122	Pat Mitchell	1982–83	Wing		
1123	Paul Whitehead	1982–83	Second row	Son of Trevor Whitehead	
1124	David Creasser	1983–84	Centre	Signed from Hunslet Parkside following BARLA U-19 tour of New Zealand	
1125	David Healy	1983–84	Fullback		
1126	Steve Martin	1983–84	Scrum half	Australian international signed from Balmain	
1127	Gary Moorby	1983–84	Second row	Signed from St Helens in exchange for Tony Burke. Began with Keighley.	
1128	Terry Webb	1983–84	Loose forward	Australian signed from Redcliffe. Later joined Hunslet	
1129	Roy Powell	1983–84	Second row	Also played for Bradford Northern, Featherstone Rovers and Batley. Died aged just 33.	
1130	Paul Prendiville	1983–84	Wing	Welsh wing signed on season-long loan from Hull	
1131	Kevin James	1983–84	Second row	Second row played as sub against Queensland during brief trial. Also played for Barrow and York	
1132	Dean Bell	1983–84	Centre	New Zealand international went on to play for Wigan after spell with Easts. Returned to Leeds as coach and played one game in 1996	
1133	Mark Laurie	1983–84	Second row	Australian second row from Parramatta. Played 1983–84 and returned for second spell in 1989–90.	
1134	Trevor Clark	1983–84	Hooker	Kiwi hooker also played for Bradford Northern and Featherstone Rovers	
1135	Ricky Lulham	1983–84	Scrum half	Australian halfback also played for Hunslet	
1136	Gareth Ingham	1983–84	Wing		
1137	Mark Wilson	1983–84	Scrum half	Also played for Bradford Northern	
1138	Richard Gunn	1983–84	Hooker	Star junior also played for Featherstone Rovers	
1139	Phil Owen	1984–85	Second row		
1140	Tony Currie	1984–85	Centre	Signed from Brisbane competition, played two seasons. Won Premierships in Australia with Canterbury and Brisbane and played for Queensland and Australia.	
1141	Trevor Paterson	1984–85	Prop	Signed for Leeds following 1983–84 Queensland tour. Played for Easts.	
1142	Brendan Hill	1984–85	Prop	Later played for Bradford Northern	
1143	Gavin Jones	1984–85	Prop	Signed for Leeds following 1983–84 Queensland tour. Played for Norths and Cronulla.	
1144	Steve Bleakley	1984–85	Loose forward	Australian signed from Brisbane competition. Also played for York.	
1145	Wally Fullerton-Smith	1984–85	Second row	Australian international from Redcliffe. Later played for St George	
1146	Neil Hunt	1984–85	Wing	Wing/fullback from Parramatta	
1147	Eric Grothe	1984–85	Wing	Australian international from Parramatta	
1148	Paul Medley	1984–85	Second row	Later joined Bradford Northern	
1149	Colin Maskill	1984–85	Hooker	Signed from Wakefield Trinity	
1150	Andrew Staniland	1985–86	Wing	Signed from rugby union. Son of Arthur Staniland	
1151	Steve Ford	1985–86	Wing	Welsh rugby union triallist. Brother of Phil Ford.	
1152	Cliff Lyons	1985–86, 1988–89	Stand off	Australian signed initially from Norths. Won two Premierships with Manly	
1153	Norman Francis	1985–86	Wing		
1154	Jeff Grayshon	1985–86	Prop	Signed from Bradford Northern. Originally a centre with Dewsbury, winning the 1972 Championship Final against Leeds.	
1155	Phil Turner	1985–86	Prop		
1156	Henry Sharp	1985–86	Wing	Later played for Halifax	
1157	Carl Gibson	1985–86	Centre	GB international signed from Batley. Also played for Featherstone Rovers	
1158	Richard Pratt	1985–86	Wing	Later played for Hull KR	
1159	Errol Johnson	1985–86	Centre	Later joined Bradford Northern	
1160	Khurshid Butt	1986–87	Second row	Later played for Featherstone Rovers. Brother of Ikram Butt.	
1161	Bob Morris	1986–87	Hooker	Australian hooker from regional NSW	
1162	Peter Smith	1986–87	Prop	Australian signed from Illawarra	
1163	Andy Gascoigne	1986–87	Scrum half	Former Bramley scrum half signed from Hull	
1164	Andrew Ettingshausen	1986–87	Fullback	Cronulla star played two spells with Leeds, 1986–87 and 1988–89	
1165	Mark McGaw	1986–87	Centre	Cronulla centre	
1166	Gary Price	1986–87	Second row	Signed from York	
1167	Trevor Skerrett	1986–87	Prop	Signed from Hull. Later joined Keighley	
1168	Andy Mason	1986–87	Centre	Former rugby union centre signed from Bramley. Joined Wakefield in 1987 in mass exchange (Andy Mason, Phil Fox, Keith Rayne and Mark Conway moved to Wakefield in exchange for Gary Spencer and John Lyons)	
1169	Phil Fox	1986–87	Wing	Signed from Leigh. Joined Wakefield in 1987 in mass exchange (Andy Mason, Phil Fox, Keith Rayne and Mark Conway moved to Wakefield in exchange for Gary Spencer and John Lyons)	
1170	Ray Ashton	1986–87	Scrum half	Signed from Oldham	
1171	Mark Wilkes	1986–87	Stand off	Australian played one game during trial. Also played for Workington Town.	
1172	John Basnett	1986–87	Wing	International wing signed from Widnes	
1173	Mark Brooke-Cowden	1987–88	Second row	All Black forward also played for Salford	
1174	Lee Crooks	1987–88	Prop	GB international signed in record transfer from Hull. Later joined Castleford.	
1175	John Lyons	1987–88	Scrum half	Signed from Wakefield in 1987 in mass exchange (Andy Mason, Phil Fox, Keith Rayne and Mark Conway moved to Wakefield in exchange for Gary Spencer and John Lyons)	
1176	Alan Rathbone	1987–88	Second row	Signed from Warrington. Leeds career lasted less than one game due to injury.	
1177	Gary Spencer	1987–88	Fullback	Signed from Wakefield in 1987 in mass exchange (Andy Mason, Phil Fox, Keith Rayne and Mark Conway moved to Wakefield in exchange for Gary Spencer and John Lyons). Later rejoined Wakefield.	
1178	Mark Lord	1987–88	Centre	Later joined Oldham	
1179	Peter Tunks	1987–88	Prop	Australian international signed from Canterbury	
1180	Marty Gurr	1987–88	Fullback	Australian signed from Manly	
1181	Peter Jackson	1987–88	Centre	Australian from Norths	
1182	Steve Morris	1987–88	Wing	Australian international from St George	
1183	Garry Schofield	1987–88	Stand off	Originally a centre signed for record fee from Hull, later moving to stand off.	
1184	John Fairbank	1987–88	Prop	Joined Oldham in exchange for Hugh Waddell. Son of Jack Fairbank.	
1185	David Stephenson	1987–88	Centre	GB international signed from Wigan	
1186	Darren Stevens	1987–88	Hooker	Australian triallist	
1187	Paul Delaney	1987–88	Scrum half	Leeds junior later played for Dewsbury	
1188	Gary Stephens	1987–88	Scrum half	Former GB international played one game for Leeds. Father of Gareth Stephens.	
1189	Vince Fawcett	1987–88	Wing	Leeds junior debuted aged 17. Also played for Parramatta	
1190	Hugh Waddell	1988–89	Prop	GB international signed from Oldham	
1191	Sam Backo	1988–89	Prop	Australia international played short spell in 1988–89	
1192	Gary Lord	1988–89	Fullback	Signed from Castleford	
1193	John Bentley	1988–89	Wing	England rugby union international later played for Halifax.	
1194	Phil Ford	1988–89	Wing	Welsh wing signed from Bradford Northern. Also played for Warrington, Wigan and Salford.	
1195	Chris Vasey	1988–89	Stand off	Signed from Dewsbury	
1196	Paul Dixon	1988–89	Prop	GB international signed from Halifax, having begun with Huddersfield.	
1197	Neil James	1989–90	Prop	Signed from Castleford. Previously played for Castleford	
1198	Warren Wilson	1989–90	Fullback	Signed from Hunslet	
1199	Gary Divorty	1989–90	Loose forward	Signed from Hull	
1200	Craig Izzard	1989–90	Second row	Short-term signing from Parramatta	
1201	Rex Terp	1989–90	Fullback	One game for Leeds. Later played for St George	
1202	Craig Coleman	1989–90	Scrum half	Short-term signing from Souths	
1203	Cavill Heugh	1989–90	Prop	Queensland rep forward signed from Barrow.	
1204	David Cruickshank	1989–90	Scrum half	Short-term signing from Souths, understudy to Craig Coleman	
1205	Mike Kuiti	1989–90	Loose forward	NZ international signed from Rochdale Hornets	
1206	Rob Ackerman	1989–90	Centre	Welsh rugby union international signed from Whitehaven	
1207	David Young	1989–90	Prop	Welsh rugby union international later played for Salford	
1208	Paul Worthy	1989–90	Prop	Later played for Dewsbury	
1209	Ikram Butt	1989–90	Wing	Later played for Featherstone	
1210	John Gallagher	1990–91	Fullback	All Blacks fullback	
1211	Paul Harkin	1990–91	Scrum half	Signed from Bradford Northern. Also played for Hull KR.	
1212	Simon Irving	1990–91	Centre	Signed from rugby union.	
1213	Eddie Rombo	1990–91	Wing	Kenyan winger signed from rugby union	
1214	Shaun Wane	1990–91	Prop	Signed from Wigan. Went on to become Wigan and GB coach.	
1215	Steve Molloy	1990–91	Prop	Signed from Warrington	
1216	Francis Maloney	1990–91	Stand off	Leeds junior	
1217	Paul Anderson	1990–91	Prop	Leeds junior debuted aged 17. Went on to play for Bradford Northern and St Helens.	
1218	Bobbie Goulding	1991–92	Scrum half	Signed from Wigan. One season with Leeds before joining Widnes in exchange for Alan Tait. Later played for St Helens	
1219	Mike O'Neill	1991–92	Prop	Former Widnes prop signed from Rochdale Hornets	
1220	Ellery Hanley	1991–92	Loose forward	GB international signed for record fee from Wigan, having begun with Bradford Northern. Broke season try record for a forward with 41 in 1994–95.	
1221	Morvin Edwards	1991–92	Fullback	New Zealand international	
1222	Gareth Stephens	1991–92	Scrum half	Son of Gary Stephens	
1223	Matt Shaw	1991–92	Second row	Signed from Ryedale York	
1224	Craig Innes	1991–92	Centre	All Black centre later won Premiership with Manly	
1225	Stuart Arundel	1991–92	Fullback	Later played for Halifax	
1226	Leigh Deakin	1991–92	Wing	Later played for York	
1227	Jim Fallon	1992–93	Wing	Signed from Bath rugby union	
1228	Andy Goodway	1992–93	Second row	GB international signed from Wigan	
1229	Andy Gregory	1992–93	Scrum half	GB international signed from Wigan	
1230	Gary Mercer	1992–93	Second row	New Zealand international signed from Warrington	
1231	Alan Tait	1992–93	Full back	Scotland rugby union international and GB rugby league international signed from Widnes in exchange for Bobbie Goulding	
1232	Mick Worrall	1992–93	Second row	Former Oldham forward signed from Salford. Father of Simon Worrall	
1233	James Lowes	1992–93	Hooker	Originally a halfback signed from Hunslet. Converted to hooker and went o to become GB international. Later played for Bradford Northern.	
1234	Kevin Iro	1992–93	Centre	NZ international centre also played for Wigan and St Helens	
1235	Carl Grigg	1992–93	Stand off	Australian triallist	
1236	Graham Middleton	1992–93	Second row	Later played for Batley	
1237	Paul Cook	1992–93	Wing	Later joined Bradford	
1238	Lee Harland	1992–93	Second row	Later played for Castleford	
1239	Graham Holroyd	1992–93	Stand off	Goalkicking halfback debuted aged 17. Later joined Halifax.	
1240	Steve Pilgrim	1992–93	Fullback	Triallist from rugby union	
1241	Jon Scales	1992–93	Wing	Signed from rugby union. Later played for Bradford	
1242	Neil Harmon	1993–94	Prop	Signed from Warrington	
1243	Steve Parrish	1993–94	Second row	Former Bradford utility signed from Batley	
1244	Matt Schultz	1993–94	Second row	Later played for Hull	
1245	Ian Scott	1993–94	Prop	Signed from Workington	
1246	Gary Rose	1993–94	Prop, Second-row	Signed from Featherstone. Later joined Hull	
1247	Francis Cummins	1993–94	Wing	Played entire career with Leeds and was the youngest Challenge cup finalist in 1994	
1248	Marcus Vassilakopoulos	1993–94	Loose forward	Later joined Sheffield Eagles	
1249	Richie Eyres	1993–94	Second-row	GB international signed from Widnes	
1250	Jim Leatham	1993–94	Prop	Later joined Hull	
1251	Neil Battye	1993–94	Second row	One game for Leeds. Also played for Castleford and Featherstone Rovers	
1252	Jason Donohue	1993–94	Scrum half	Signed from Leigh. Later joined Bradford	
1253	Phil Hassan	1993–94	Centre	Later played for Salford	
1254	Harvey Howard	1993–94	Prop	Signed from Widnes. Won Premiership with Brisbane Broncos	
1255	Anthony Barrett	1993–94	Wing		
1256	Nick Fozzard	1993–94	Prop	Prop later joined Huddersfield. Played for a number of clubs including St Helens. Son of Peter Fozzard.	
1257	Lee Maher	1993–94	Fullback	Later played for Doncaster	
1258	Carl Pearson	1993–94	Prop		
1259	Steve Pickles	1993–94	Hooker		
1260	-	-	-	Leeds have this as Matt Shaw. This may be a repeat of 1223, and is also not Mick Shaw (1265)	
1261	Patrick Entat	1994–95	Scrum half	French international halfback also played for Hull	
1262	Esene Faimalo	1994–95	Prop	Signed from Widnes	
1263	George Mann	1994–95	Prop	Signed from St Helens	
1264	Marvin Golden	1994–95	Wing	Later joined Halifax	
1265	Mick Shaw	1994–95	Hooker	Later played for Rochdale Hornets	
1266	Adrian Morley	1994–95	Second row	Won Challenge Cup with Leeds and Premiership with Easts. Returned to win controversial GF with Bradford and later won Challenge Cups with Warrington.	
1267	David Gibbons	1994–95	Scrum half	Later joined Keighley. Brother of Anthony Gibbons and nephew of Neil Hague	
1268	Alan Julian	1994–95	Second row	Later joined Keighley.	
1269	Tony Kemp	1995–96	Stand off	New Zealand international previously played for Castleford	
1270	Mike Forshaw	1995–96	Second row	Former Wigan forward signed from Wakefield Trinity. Later joined Bradford after spell in rugby union.	
1271	Paddy Handley	1995–96	Scrum half	Later joined Featherstone Rovers	
1272	Jamie Field	1995–96	Prop	Also played for Huddersfield, Wakefield Trinity and Featherstone Rovers	
1273	Barrie McDermott	1995–96	Prop	GB international signed from Wigan	
1274	Anthony Gibbons	1995–96	Fullback	Later joined Keighley. Brother of David Gibbons and nephew of Neil Hague	
1275	Carl Hall	1996	Centre	Kiwi signed from Bradford	
1276	John Riley	1996	Wing		
1277	Paul Gleadhill	1996	Wing	Later joined Featherstone Rovers	
1278	Terry Newton	1996	Hooker	Later joined Wigan	
1279	Nathan Picchi	1996	Loose forward	Kiwi injured in only appearance for Leeds.	
1280	Dean Clark	1996	Stand off	New Zealand international previously played for Hull KR	
1281	Sateki Tuipulotu	1996	Wing	Signed from Tongan rugby union	
1282	Gavin Brown	1996	Scrum half	Later joined Bramley	
1283	David Hulme	1996	Scrum half	GB international played short spell with Leeds from Widnes.	
1284	Leroy Rivett	1996	Wing	Scored record 4 tries in 1999 Challenge Cup Final	
1285	Marcus St Hilaire	1996	Fullback	Signed from Huddersfield	
1286	Adam Hughes	1996	Centre	Later joined Wakefield Trinity	
1287	Wayne Collins	1997	Hooker	Signed from South Queensland	
1288	Anthony Farrell	1997	Second row	Signed from Sheffield Eagles. Later joined Widnes.	
1289	Damian Gibson	1997	Fullback	Signed from North Queensland. Later joined Halifax.	
1290	Dean Lawford	1997	Hooker	Signed from Sheffield Eagles. Later joined Halifax.	
1291	Martin Masella	1997	Prop	Signed from Souths. Later joined Wakkefield Trinity	
1292	Jamie Mathiou	1997	Prop	Signed from North Queensland	
1293	Paul Sterling	1997	Wing	Signed from Hunslet. previously played for Hull.	
1294	Ryan Sheridan	1997	Scrum half	Signed from Sheffield Eagles	
1295	Richie Blackmore	1997	Centre	New Zealand international signed from NZ Warriors. Previously played for Castleford.	
1296	Iestyn Harris	1997	Stand off	GB international signed from Warrington. Left to join rugby union, becoming Wales international. Returned to league with Bradford.	
1297	Andy Hay	1997	Second row	Former Castleford second row signed from Sheffield Eagles.	
1298	Kevin Sinfield	1997	Loose forward	Stand off/loose forward broke career points record with Leeds, and captained the team to seven Championships and two Challenge Cups. Father of Jack Sinfield.	
1299	Garreth Carvell	1997	Prop	Later joined Gateshead and Hull	
1300	Phil Cantillon	1997	Hooker	Signed from Keighley, later joining Widnes.	
1301	Darren Fleary	1997	Prop	Signed from Keighley, becoming GB international with Leeds. Later joined Huddersfield	
1302	Marc Glanville	1998	Loose forward	Australian signed from Newcastle Knights where he won a Premiership	
1303	Brad Godden	1998	Centre	Australian signed from Hunter Mariners	
1304	Daryl Powell	1998	Stand off	Former Sheffield centre/stand off signed from Keighley. Later coached Leeds, Featherstone Rovers, Castleford and Warrington.	
1305	Lee Jackson	1999	Hooker	GB international signed from Newcastle Knights. Previously played for Hull and rejoined them after leaving Leeds.	
1306	Karl Pratt	1999	Wing	Signed from Featherstone Rovers. Later joined Bradford.	
1307	Danny Ward	1999	Prop	Later joined Castleford and coached London. Son of David Ward.	
1308	Chris Chapman	1999	Centre	Later joined Sheffield	
1309	Jamie Jones-Buchanan	1999	Second row	Second row played over 400 games for Leeds. Half-brother of Ben Jones-Bishop.	
1310	David Wrench	1999	Second row	Later joined Wakefield Trinity	
1311	Andy Speak	1999	Hooker	Later joined Wakefield Trinity	
1312	Chev Walker	1999	Centre	Left Leeds for rugby union. Later played for Hull KR and Bradford	
1313	Keith Senior	1999	Centre	GB international signed from Sheffield Eagles	
1314	David Barnhill	2000	Second row	Signed from Sydney Roosters	
1315	Paul Bell	2000	Centre	Australian signed from Melbourne	
1316	Graham Mackay	2000	Centre	Australian won Premiership with Penrith and played for Bradford and Hull	
1317	Gareth Raynor	2000	Wing	Signed from rugby union. Later played for Hull	
1318	Tonie Carroll	2001	Centre	Australian international signed from Brisbane Broncos	
1319	Bradley Clyde	2001	Second row	Australian international signed from Canterbury, having won Premierships with Canberra	
1320	Robbie Mears	2001	Hooker	Australian signed from NZ Warriors. Later joined Wests	
1321	Brett Mullins	2001	Fullback	Australian international signed from Canberra. Later joined the Roosters	
1322	Matt Diskin	2001	Hooker	Harry Sunderland winner in 2004. Later played for Bradford	
1323	Mark Calderwood	2001	Wing	Later played for Wigan and Hull	
1324	Ewan Dowes	2001	Prop	Later played for Hull	
1325	Jon Liddell	2001	Hooker	Later played for York	
1326	Rob Burrow	2001	Scrum half	Almost 500 games for Leeds, winning 8 Championships and 2 Challenge Cups.	
1327	Andy Kirk	2001	Centre	Later joined Salford	
1328	Jason Netherton	2001	Second row	Joined Hull KR	
1329	Danny McGuire	2001	Stand off	Fourth highest tryscorer (267) in over 400 appearances, winning 8 Championships and 2 Challenge Cups	
1330	Gareth Morton	2001	Second row	Left for rugby union	
1331	Matt Adamson	2002	Second row	Australian signed from Penrith. Left to join Canberra.	
1332	Wayne McDonald	2002	Prop	Signed from St Helens	
1333	Willie Poching	2002	Second row	Kiwi signed from Wakefield Trinity	
1334	Adrian Vowles	2002	Loose forward	Australian signed from Castleford. Later joined Wakefield Trinity	
1335	Ben Walker	2002	Stand off	Australian signed from Manly	
1336	Ryan Bailey	2002	Prop	Leeds junior won 6 Championships and a Challenge Cup before joining Hull KR	
1337	Richie Mathers	2002	Fullback	Championship winner in 2004 left to join the Gold Coast.	
1338	Nick Scruton	2002	Prop	Joined Bradford Northern	
1339	Gary Connolly	2003	Centre	GB international signed from Wigan, having begun career with St Helens	
1340	Andrew Dunemann	2003	Stand off	Australian signed from Halifax. Previously played for North Queensland against Leeds in the 1997 World Club Challenge series	
1341	Chris Feather	2003	Prop	Signed from Wakefield Trinity. Later joined Bradford	
1342	David Furner	2003	Loose forward	Australian signed from Wigan where he won a Challenge Cup. Previously won Premiership with Canberra. Later returned to Leeds as coach in 2019.	
1343	Chris McKenna	2003	Second row	Queensland representative signed from Cronulla. Later joined Bradford.	
1344	Jonny Hepworth	2003	Hooker	Later joined Castleford	
1345	Liam Botham	2003	Second row	Son of Ian Botham signed from rugby union. Later joined Wigan	
1346	Marcus Bai	2004	Wing	PNG international signed from Melbourne. Later joined Bradford	
1347	Ali Lauitiiti	2004	Second row	Kiwi international signed from NZ Warriors	
1348	Carl Ablett	2004	Second row	Leeds junior played a few games on loan at London in 2005	
1349	Gareth Ellis	2005	Second row	GB international signed from Wakefield Trinity. Later joined Wests and returned to England with Hull.	
1350	Lee Smith	2005	Wing	Leeds junior won the Harry Sunderland trophy from fullback in the 2008 Grand Final. Brief spell in rugby union and also played for Wakefield Trinity and Bradford	
1351	Scott Murrell	2005	Stand off	Later played for Hull KR. Son of Bryan Murrell	
1352	Ashley Gibson	2005	Centre	Later played for Salford and Castleford	
1353	Scott Donald	2006	Wing	Signed from Manly, having played for North Queensland and Parramatta	
1354	Shane Millard	2006	Hooker	Australian signed from Widnes later joined Wigan	
1355	Jamie Peacock	2006	Prop	GB international signed from Bradford. won 9 Championships in total, including 6 with Leeds	
1356	Danny Williams	2006	Wing	Left for rugby union, returning to league with Salford	
1357	Ian Kirke	2006	Second row	Signed from York	
1358	Jordan Tansey	2006	Fullback	Left for a short spell with the Roosters before returning to England with Hull	
1359	Nathan McAvoy	2006	Centre	Played one game from Salford. Previously played for Bradford Northern.	
1360	Mark O'Neill	2006	Second row	Australian signed from Wests. Later joined Hull KR.	
1361	Jamie Thackray	2006	Prop	Signed from Hull	
1362	Clinton Toopi	2006	Centre	NZ international signed from NZ Warriors	
1363	Kylie Leuluai	2007	Prop	Kiwi prop signed from Manly	
1364	Brent Webb	2007	Fullback	NZ international signed from NZ Warriors. Left to join Catalans	
1365	Ryan Hall	2007	Wing	Fifth highest tryscorer for Leeds with 233. Left to join Easts before returning to England with Hull KR	
1366	Mike Ratu	2007	Centre	Joined Hull KR	
1367	Luke Burgess	2008	Centre	Left to join brothers Sam, Tom and George at Souths	
1368	Ben Kaye	2008	Hooker	Left to join London Broncos	
1369	Simon Worrall	2008	Second row	Son of Mick Worrall	
1370	Danny Allan	2008	Stand off	Later joined Featherstone Rovers	
1371	Ben Jones-Bishop	2008	Wing	Later signed for Salford.	
1372	Kallum Watkins	2008	Centre	GB international left to join Gold Coast Titans	
1373	Éric Anselme	2008	Centre	French international joined on short contract in 2008	
1374	Joe Chandler	2008	Prop	Signed for Oldham	
1375	Michael Haley	2008	Prop	Signed for Doncaster	
1376	Paul McShane	2009	Hooker	Later joined Wakefield Trinity and then Castleford	
1377	Danny Buderus	2009	Hooker	Australian international signed from Newcastle Knights	
1378	Dane Manning	2009	Second row	Later signed for Featherstone Rovers	
1379	Jay Pitts	2009	Second row	Signed from Wakefield Trinity and later joined Hull	
1380	Brett Delaney	2010	Second row	Australian centre signed from Gold Coast Titans converted to second row	
1381	Greg Eastwood	2010	Second row	NZ international signed from Canterbury. Returned to Canterbury after one season	
1382	Tom Bush	2010	Wing	Later joined York	
1383	Kyle Amor	2010	Prop	Cumbrian signed from Whitehaven. Joined St Helens after spell with Wakefield Trinity	
1384	Michael Coady	2010	Wing	Short-term signing from Doncaster	
1385	Luke Ambler	2010	Prop	Signed from Salford. Later joined Halifax	
1386	Chris Clarkson	2010	Second row	Later joined Hull KR	
1387	Ben Cross	2011	Prop	NSW rep signed from Newscastle Knights. Later joined Wigan.	
1388	Weller Hauraki	2011	Second row	Kiwi second row signed from Crusaders. Later joined Castleford	
1389	Brad Singleton	2011	Prop	Cumbrian prop later joined Toronto	
1390	Zak Hardaker	2011	Fullback	Signed from Featherstone Rovers. Rejoined Leeds in 2022 from Wigan	
1391	George Elliott	2011	Wing	Later joined York	
1392	Richard Moore	2012	Prop	Signed from Crusaders. Later joined Wakefield Trinity	
1393	Liam Hood	2012	Hooker	Later joined Salford	
1394	Darrell Griffin	2012	Prop	Signed from huddersfield	
1395	Stevie Ward	2012	Second row	Forced to retire early due to concussion issues	
1396	Shaun Lunt	2012	Hooker	Won Championship in 2012 on loan from Huddersfield	
1397	Jimmy Keinhorst	2012	Centre	German international later joined Hull KR	
1398	Mitch Achurch	2012	Second row	Signed from Penrith	
1399	Joel Moon	2013	Centre	Australian signed from Salford	
1400	Joe Vickery	2013	Wing	Signed from Queensland Cup	
1401	Liam Sutcliffe	2013	Centre	Utility back	
1402	Thomas Minns	2013	Centre	Later joined Hull KR	
1403	Jordan Baldwinson	2013	Prop	Later joined Wakefield Trinity	
1404	Alex Foster	2013	Second row	Later joined Featherstone Rovers	
1405	James Duckworth	2013	Wing	Later joined Hunslet	
1406	Elliot Minchella	2013	Second row	Later joined Sheffield Eagles	
1407	Paul Aiton	2014	Hooker	PNG international signed from Wakefield Trinity. Later joined Catalans	
1408	Tom Briscoe	2014	Wing	GB international signed from Hull. Scored record 5 tries in Challenge Cup final in 2015. Brother of Luke Briscoe	
1409	Rob Mulhern	2014	Prop	Later joined Hull KR	
1410	Robbie Ward	2014	Hooker	Later joined Featherstone Rovers	
1411	Josh Walters	2014	Second row	Signed from rugby union, scored winning try in 2015 Grand Final	
1412	Luke Briscoe	2014	Wing	Later joined Featherstone. Brother of Tom Briscoe	
1413	Ash Handley	2014	Wing		
1414	Ashton Golding	2014	Fullback	Later joined Huddersfield	
1415	Ben White	2015	Scrum half		
1416	Adam Cuthbertson	2015	Prop	Australian signed from Newcastle Knights	
1417	Andy Yates	2015	Prop	Signed from Hunslet and later joined Wakefield Trinity	
1418	Jordan Lilley	2015	Scrum half	Later joined Bradford	
1419	Mitch Garbutt	2015	Prop	Australian prop signed from Brisbane Broncos. Later joined Hull KR.	
1420	Brett Ferres	2016	Second row	GB international signed from Huddersfield	
1421	Keith Galloway	2016	Prop	Australian international signed from Wests	
1422	Anthony Mullally	2016	Prop	Signed from Huddersfield. Later joined Toronto	
1423	Beau Falloon	2016	Hooker	Signed from Gold Coast Titans	
1424	Cameron Smith	2016	Loose forward	Brother Daniel (played for Wakefield Trinity ad Castleford) was also a Leeds junior	
1425	Sam Hallas	2016	Hooker	Later joined Bradford. Grandson of Derek Hallas.	
1426	James Segeyaro	2016	Hooker	PNG international played short spell from Penrith	
1427	Josh Jordan-Roberts	2016	Second row	Later joined York	
1428	Matt Parcell	2017	Hooker	Australian signed from Manly. Later joined Hull KR	
1429	Jack Ormondroyd	2017	Prop	Signed from Featherstone Rovers	
1430	Mikołaj Olędzki	2017	Prop		
1431	Jack Walker	2017	Fullback	Played in 2017 Grand Final win aged 17.	
1432	Harry Newman	2017	Centre		
1433	Alex Sutcliffe	2017	Centre	Later joined Castleford	
1434	Harvey Whiteley	2017	Hooker		
1435	Brad Dwyer	2018	Hooker	Signed from Warrington	
1436	Richie Myler	2018	Fullback	Halfback signed from Catalans successfully converted to fullback. Previously with Warrington	
1437	Nathaniel Peteru	2018	Prop	Signed from the Gold Coast Titans. later joined Hull KR	
1438	Ken Owens	1965–66	Hooker	Australian hooker signed from Wests later played for Hull. This player is out of sequence – should be 1,002	
1439	Tom Holroyd	2018	Prop		
1440	Dom Crosby	2018	Prop	Former Wigan prop signed from Warrington	
1442	James Donaldson	2019	Second row	Former Bradford and Hull KR forward	
1443	Konrad Hurrell	2019	Centre	Tongan international signed from Gold Coast Titans. Joined St Helens	
1444	Tuimoala Lolohea	2019	Stand off	Tongan international signed from Wests. Joined Salford	
1445	Trent Merrin	2019	Prop	Australian international signed from St George-Illawarra	
1446	Wellington Albert	2019	Prop	PNG international signed from Widnes	
1447	Callum McLelland	2019	Stand off	Signed from rugby union. Joined Castleford.	
1448	Muizz Mustapha	2019	Prop		
1449 (Note: Trout's profile page on the Rhinos' website states 1439, but this must be a typo as his debut was in 2019. Also his debut came after Mustapha's, and before Seumanufagai's. See following references.)	Owen Trout	2019	Second row	Later joined Huddersfield	
1450	Ava Seumanufagai	2019	Prop	Signed from Cronulla. Later joined Canterbury	
1451	Robert Lui	2019	Stand off	Australian signed from Salford in exchange from Lolohea	
1452	Rhyse Martin	2019	Second row	PNG international signed from Canterbury	
1453	Corey Johnson	2019	Hooker		
1454	Luke Gale	2020	Scrum half	Former Leeds junior signed as GB international from Castleford. Later joined Hull.	
1455	Alex Mellor	2020	Second row	Signed from Huddersfield. Signed for Castleford.	
1456	Matt Prior	2020	Prop	Signed from Cronulla.	
1457	Kruise Leeming	2020	Hooker	Signed from Huddersfield	
1458	Rhys Evans	2020	Centre	Welsh centre signed on loan from Bradford	
1459	Bodene Thompson	2020	Second row	NZ forward signed from Toronto	
1460	Jack Broadbent	2020	Centre	Signed for Castleford	
1461	Corey Hall	2020	Centre	Signed for Wakefield Trinity	
1462	James Harrison	2020	Prop	Loan signing from Featherstone. Son of former GB prop Karl Harrison	
1463	Loui McConnell	2020	Second row		
1464	Jarrod O'Connor	2020	Loose forward	Son of former Wigan prop Terry O'Connor	
1465	Liam Tindall	2020	Wing		
1466	Sam Walters	2020	Prop		
1467	Martyn Smithson	1987–88	Second row	Played only game vs Auckland 1987. Should be 1184.	
1468	Zane Tetevano	2021	Prop	New Zealand international signed from Penrith	
1469	Morgan Gannon	2021	Second row	Son of former Huddersfield forward Jim Gannon	
1470	Kyle Eastmond	2021	Stand off	Dual-code international signed from rugby union. Began with St Helens	
1471	King Vuniyayawa	2021	Prop	Fijian prop signed from NZ Warriors. Later joined Salford.	
1472	James Bentley	2022	Second row	Signed from St Helens	
1473	David Fusitu'a	2022	Wing	NZ and Tongan international signed from NZ Warriors	
1474	Aidan Sezer	2022	Scrum half	Australian signed from Huddersfield	
1475	Blake Austin	2022	Stand off	Australian signed from Warrington	
1476	Max Simpson	2022	Centre		
1477	Jack Sinfield	2022	Stand off	Son of Kevin Sinfield	
1478	Yusuf Aydin	2022	Prop	Turkish international loan signing from Wakefield Trinity	
1479	Sam Lisone	2023	Prop	Signed from Gold Coast Titans	
1480	Derrell Olpherts	2023	Wing	Signed from Castleford. Signed to Wakefield in March 2024	
1481	Luis Roberts	2023	Wing	Wing/centre signed from Leigh	
1482	Justin Sangaré	2023	Prop	French international signed from Toulouse	
1483	Nene Macdonald	2023	Centre	PNG international signed from Leigh. Signed to Salford in 2024	
1484	James McDonnell	2023	Second row	Ireland international signed from Wigan.	
1485	Luke Hooley	2023	Fullback	Former Wakefield junior signed from Batley. Signed to Castleford the following year	
1486	Leon Ruan	2023	Second row	Former Wakefield junior signed from Doncaster.	
1487	Mickaël Goudemand	Second-row, Loose forward	2024	France	
1488	Lachie Miller	Fullback	2024	Former Australian Olympic Rugby 7’s fullback signed from Newcastle	
1489	Matt Frawley	Stand-off	2024	Stand off signed from Canberra. Previously played for Huddersfield	
1490	Paul Momirovski	Centre	2024	Bought from Sydney Roosters	
1491	Brodie Croft	Scrum Half	2024	Previously played for Melbourne. Bought from Salford in record fee along with Andy Ackers	
1492	Andy Ackers	Hooker	2024	GB international bought in record fee with Brodie Croft ahead of 2024 season from Salford	
