= Steve Pilgrim =

Steve Pilgrim may refer to:

- Steve Pilgrim (rugby)
- Steve Pilgrim (musician)
