= 1922–23 Challenge Cup =

Rugby league competition

- Duration: 5 rounds
- Winners: Leeds
- Runners-up: Hull F.C.

The 1922–23 Challenge Cup was the 23rd staging of rugby league's oldest knockout competition, the Challenge Cup.

== First round ==
Date	Team one	Score one	Team two	Score two
17 Feb	Barrow	8	St Helens Recs	0
17 Feb	Batley	0	Oldham	0
17 Feb	Broughton Rangers	0	Hull FC	13
17 Feb	Dewsbury	19	Bradford Northern	0
17 Feb	Hensingham	13	Wakefield Trinity	67
17 Feb	Keighley	2	Hull Kingston Rovers	0
17 Feb	Leigh	5	Leeds	11
17 Feb	Norwood	3	St Helens	29
17 Feb	Rochdale Hornets	3	Huddersfield	5
17 Feb	Salford	16	Castleford	0
17 Feb	Swinton	4	Hunslet	2
17 Feb	Warrington	3	Halifax	3
17 Feb	Widnes	2	Featherstone Rovers	5
17 Feb	Wigan	47	Bramley	0
17 Feb	York	40	Millom	0
19 Feb	Oldham	14	Batley	0
26 Feb	Halifax	16	Warrington	3
26 Feb	Wigan Highfield	16	Cadishead and Irlam	0

== Second round ==
Date	Team one	Score one	Team two	Score two
03 Mar	Dewsbury	21	Wigan Highfield	7
03 Mar	Featherstone Rovers	13	Wigan	14
03 Mar	Keighley	0	Barrow	5
03 Mar	Leeds	19	Huddersfield	8
03 Mar	St Helens	3	Oldham	11
03 Mar	Salford	6	Wakefield Trinity	0
03 Mar	Swinton	5	Hull FC	13
03 Mar	York	5	Halifax	0

== Quarterfinals ==
Date	Team one	Score one	Team two	Score two
17 Mar	Barrow	12	Oldham	0
17 Mar	Salford	0	Hull FC	24
17 Mar	Wigan	20	Dewsbury	12
17 Mar	York	2	Leeds	10

== Semifinals ==
Date	Team one	Score one	Team two	Score two
14 Apr	Hull FC	13	Wigan	9
14 Apr	Leeds	0	Barrow	0
18 Apr	Barrow	0	Leeds	20

== Final ==
Leeds defeat Hull F.C. 28–3 in the final at Belle Vue, Wakefield to win their second Challenge Cup in their second appearance.

28 April 1923

Leeds	28 – 3	Hull F.C.
Tries: Walmsley, Buck, Bowen, Brittain, Davis, Ashton; Goals: Thompson (5)		Tries: Kennedy

Belle Vue, Wakefield
Attendance: 29,335
Referee: F. Mills (Oldham)

FB	1	Syd Walmsley
RW	2	Harold Buck
RC	3	Billy Bowen
LC	4	Jim Bacon
LW	5	William Lyons
SO	6	Arthur Binks
SH	7	Joe Brittain
PR	8	Joe Dixon
HK	9	George Jackson
PR	10	Henry Trusler
SR	11	Joe Thompson
SR	12	Bill Davis
LF	13	Jack Ashton
Coach:

FB	1	Fred Samuel
RW	2	Jack Holdsworth
RC	3	Stan Whitty
LC	4	Jim Kennedy
LW	5	Billy Stone
SO	6	Eddie Caswell
SH	7	Emlyn Gwynne
PR	8	George Oliver
HK	9	Harold Bowman
PR	10	Jack Beasty
SR	11	Edgar Morgan
SR	12	Bob Taylor
LF	13	Pete Garrett
Coach:
