= Billy Bowen =

Wales international rugby union & league footballer

- Born: William E Bowen; 6 December 1897 Swansea, Wales
- Died: 19 December 1960 (aged 63) Morriston, Wales

Rugby union career
- Position: Fly half
Senior career
| Years | Team | Apps | (Points) |
| 1919-1922 | Swansea RFC | | |
International career
| Years | Team | Apps | (Points) |
| 1921-1922 | Wales | 6 | (6) |
- Rugby league career

Playing information
- Position: Back, e.g. centre
Club
| Years | Team | Pld | T | G | FG | P |
|---|---|---|---|---|---|---|
| 1922 | Leeds | 85 | | | | 79 |

William Bowen (6 December 1897 – 19 December 1960) was a Welsh dual-code rugby union, and professional rugby league footballer who played in the 1910s and 1920s. He played representative level rugby union (RU) for Wales, winning 6 caps, and at club level for Swansea, as a fly half, and club level rugby league (RL) for Leeds, as a centre.

== Rugby career ==
Bowen was first selected to play for Wales during the 1921 Five Nations Championship in a game against Scotland. Under the captaincy of Tommy Vile, Wales lost the match in a match that was nearly abandoned due to crowd problems, when the St Helen's spectators kept pushing onto the pitch. Bowen was re-selected for the next game of the tournament this time against France in a victory at the Cardiff Arms Park, though he lost his place for the last match in Ireland.

Bowen was reselected to represent Wales for the entirety of the 1922 Five Nations Championship in which Wales won the tournament, winning three of the games and drawing against Scotland. Bowen scored two tries during the tournament; the first in the opening Welsh victory over England when Bowen was one of eight different players to score a try for Wales. His second was more important, as it allowed the draw with Scotland snatched by Wales when Islwyn Evans scored a drop goal in the last two minutes.

Bowen may have been awarded more caps for Wales, but he 'Went North' in 1922, switching codes to professional rugby league, joining Leeds RLFC. Bowen made his début for Leeds against Bradford Northern at Headingley, Leeds on Saturday 2 September 1922. Bowen played at centre and scored a try in Leeds' 28–3 victory over Hull F.C. in the 1922–23 Challenge Cup Final during the 1922-23 season at Belle Vue, Wakefield, the only occasion the Challenge Cup final has ever been staged at Belle Vue. The Leeds backline in the early 1920s was known as the Busy Bs, as it included; Jim Bacon, Arthur Binks, Billy Bowen, Joe Brittain and Harold Buck.

=== International matches played ===
Wales

- England 1922
- France 1921, 1922
- Ireland 1922
- Scotland 1921, 1922

== Bibliography ==
- Godwin, Terry (1984). The International Rugby Championship 1883-1983. London: Willows Books. ISBN 0-00-218060-X.
- Smith, David; Williams, Gareth (1980). Fields of Praise: The Official History of The Welsh Rugby Union. Cardiff: University of Wales Press. ISBN 0-7083-0766-3.
