= Harold Buck =

English rugby league footballer

Personal information
- Full name: Harold Buck
- Born: 25 October 1892

Playing information
- Position: Wing
Club
Years	Team	Pld	T	G	FG	P
1912–21	Hunslet	101	60	9	0	198
1921–24	Leeds	94	67	13	1	229
1924–25	Bradford Northern
1925–27	Hunslet	65	19	11	0	79
	Total	260	146	33	1	506

Harold Buck was an English professional rugby league footballer who played in the 1910s and 1920s. He played at club level for Hunslet and Leeds, as a wing.

== Biography ==
Buck started his rugby league career with Hunslet, making his debut in November 1912.

In November 1921, Buck became rugby league's first £1,000 player when he transferred from Hunslet to Leeds, Buck made his début for Leeds against Wigan at Headingley, Leeds on Saturday 5 November 1921, he went on to play 99 matches for Leeds, scoring 72 tries and 15 goals, for 246 points. Buck played on the wing and scored a try in Leeds' 28–3 victory over Hull F.C. in the 1922–23 Challenge Cup Final during the 1922-23 season at Belle Vue, Wakefield, the only occasion the Challenge Cup final has ever been staged at Belle Vue. The Leeds backline in the early 1920s was known as the Busy Bs, as it included; Jim Bacon, Arthur Binks, Billy Bowen, Joe Brittain, and Harold Buck.

In 1924, Buck made a replacement appearance in the Great Britain trial match in advance of the 1924 Great Britain Lions tour, but Buck was ultimately not selected for the tour.

After a brief spell with Bradford Northern, Buck returned to Hunslet in January 1925.

=== Outside rugby league ===
Buck was the landlord, and he and his wife, Florrie (née Fox), ran The Coburg Tavern at the junction of Woodhouse Lane and Claypit Lane, in Leeds.

Achievements
Preceded by Billy Batten	Rugby League Transfer Record; Hunslet to Leeds; 1921-1937	Succeeded by Vic Hey
