= Syd Walmsley =

England international rugby league footballer

Personal information
- Born: 17 July 1896; Bootle district, England
- Died: February 1973 (aged 76); Leeds, England

Playing information
- Position: Fullback
Club
Years	Team	Pld	T	G	FG	P
≤1920–20	Millom
1920–25	Leeds	188	35	159	8	439
1925–≥25	Huddersfield
	Total	188	35	159	8	439
Representative
Years	Team	Pld	T	G	FG	P
1920–27	Cumberland	12	4	8	0	28
1923–24	England	2	0	2	0	4

Syd Walmsley (17 July 1896 – February 1973) was an English professional rugby league footballer who played in the 1910s and 1920s. He played at representative level for England, and at club level for Millom, Leeds and Huddersfield, as a goal-kicking fullback.

== Background ==
Syd Walmsley's birth was registered in Bootle district, Cumberland.

== Playing career ==
=== Leeds ===
Walmsley played fullback, and scored a try in Millom's 5–44 defeat by Leeds in the 1919–20 Challenge Cup first-round match during the 1919–20 season at Millom on Saturday 21 February 1920. Impressing the Leeds management, he was transferred from Millom, and he made his début for Leeds in the 11-0 victory over Wakefield Trinity on Saturday 20 March 1920. He became a regular goal kicker at Leeds, and was Leeds' leading goal-scorer with 28-goals during the 1920-21 season.

Walmsley played fullback, and scored a try in Leeds’ 11–3 victory over Dewsbury in the 1921–22 Yorkshire Cup Final during the 1921–22 season at Thrum Hall, Halifax on Saturday 26 November 1921.

Walmsley played fullback, and scored a try in Leeds’ 28-3 victory over Hull F.C. in the 1922–23 Challenge Cup Final during the 1922-23 season at Belle Vue, Wakefield, the only occasion the Challenge Cup final has ever been staged at Belle Vue.

=== Huddersfield ===
Walmsley played fullback, and scored two-goals in Huddersfield’s 10–3 victory over Wakefield Trinity in the 1926–27 Yorkshire Cup final during the 1926–27 season at Headingley, Leeds on Wednesday 1 December 1926, the initial match at Headingley, Leeds on Saturday 27 November 1926 had been postponed due to fog.

=== International honours ===
Walmsley won caps for England while at Leeds in 1923 against Wales, and in 1924 against Wales.

He was selected in trial matches for the 1924 Great Britain Lions tour, but was ultimately not selected for Great Britain, with Ernie Knapman and Jim Sullivan, selected at fullback for the tour of Australia, and New Zealand.

== Outside of rugby league ==
Walmsley ran a camp in the Yorkshire Dales for children as part of the evacuations of civilians in Britain during World War II.

He died in Leeds in February 1973, aged 76.
