= Joe Brittain =

England international rugby league footballer

Personal information
- Full name: Joseph Brittain
- Born: unknown
- Died: unknown

Playing information
- Position: Stand-off, Scrum-half
Club
Years	Team	Pld	T	G	FG	P
1915–24	Leeds	180	69			207
≤1926–≥26	York
	Total	180	69	0	0	207
Representative
Years	Team	Pld	T	G	FG	P
1919–22	Yorkshire	7	2	0	0	6
1921–22	England	4	1	0	0	3

Joseph Brittain (birth unknown – death unknown) was an English professional rugby league footballer who played in the 1910s and 1920s. He played at representative level for England, and at club level for Leeds and York, as a stand-off or scrum-half.

== Playing career ==
=== Challenge Cup Final appearances ===
Joe Brittain played scrum-half, and scored a try in Leeds' 28-3 victory over Hull F.C. in the 1922–23 Challenge Cup Final during the 1922-23 season at Belle Vue, Wakefield, the only occasion the Challenge Cup final has ever been staged at Belle Vue.

=== County Cup Final appearances ===
Joe Brittain played stand-off in Leeds' 11-3 victory over Dewsbury in the 1921–22 Yorkshire Cup Final during the 1921–22 season at Thrum Hall, Halifax on Saturday 26 November 1921.

=== Club career ===
Brittain made his début for Leeds against Batley at Headingley, Leeds on Saturday 4 September 1915.

The Leeds backline in the early 1920s was known as the Busy Bs, as it included; Jim Bacon, Arthur Binks, Billy Bowen, Joe Brittain, and Harold Buck.

=== International honours ===
Brittain won caps for England while at Leeds in 1921 against Wales, Other Nationalities, and Australia, in 1922 against Wales.
