= Jim Bacon (rugby) =

Welsh RL coach and former GB & Wales international rugby league footballer

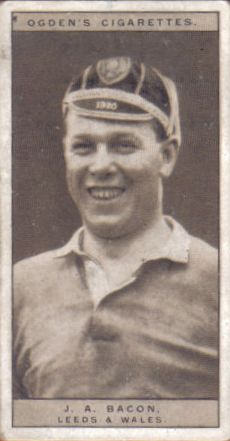
- Ogden's Cigarette card featuring Bacon

Personal information
- Full name: James Arthur Bacon
- Born: fourth ¼ 1896; Newport district, Wales
- Died: fourth ¼ 1968 (aged 72); Weston-super-Mare, England

Playing information

Rugby union
Club
Years	Team	Pld	T	G	FG	P
	Cross Keys

Rugby league
- Position: Wing, Centre
Club
Years	Team	Pld	T	G	FG	P
1918–27	Leeds	276	121	20		403
1928–30	Castleford	41	7			21
	Total	317	128	20	0	424
Representative
Years	Team	Pld	T	G	FG	P
1927	Monmouthshire	≥1
1921–27	Wales	6	2	0	0	6
1920–27	Great Britain	11	6	0	0	18

Coaching information
Club
Years	Team	Gms	W	D	L	W%
1928–29	Castleford	41	16	4	21	39

James Arthur Bacon (fourth ¼ 1896 – fourth ¼ 1968) was a Welsh rugby union, and professional rugby league footballer who played in the 1910s, 1920s and 1930s, and coached rugby league in the 1920s. He played club level rugby union (RU) for Cross Keys, and representative level rugby league (RL) for Great Britain, Wales and Monmouthshire, and at club level for Leeds (captain), and Castleford, as a wing, or centre, and coached at club level for Castleford.

== Background ==
Jim Bacon's birth was registered in Newport, Wales, and his death aged 72 was registered in Weston-super-Mare, Somerset.

== Playing career ==
Jim Bacon played rugby union for Cross Keys RFC, and having appeared as a trialist for Wales (RU) some weeks before, he moved north and made his professional début for English rugby league club Leeds against Bradford Northern at Headingley, Leeds on Saturday 14 December 1918. Bacon was selected to go on the 1920 Great Britain Lions tour of Australasia. He won caps for Great Britain (RL) while at Leeds in 1920 against Australia (3 matches), and New Zealand (3 matches), in 1921 against Australia (2 matches), in 1922 against Australia, in 1924 against Australia, and in 1927 against New Zealand. From 1921 until 1927 he also represented Wales, winning six caps, all against England, including 1-victory, and 5-defeats.

Jim Bacon played on the wing in Monmouthshire's 14-18 defeat by Glamorgan in the non-County Championship match during the 1926–27 season at Taff Vale Park, Pontypridd on Saturday 30 April 1927.

Jim Bacon played at centre and scored 2-tries in Leeds' 11–3 victory over Dewsbury in the 1921–22 Yorkshire Cup Final during the 1921–22 season at Thrum Hall, Halifax on Saturday 26 November 1921. Bacon played at centre and was captain in Leeds' 28–3 victory over Hull F.C. in the 1922–23 Challenge Cup Final during the 1922–23 season at Belle Vue, Wakefield, the only occasion the Challenge Cup Final has ever been staged at Belle Vue. The Leeds backline in the early 1920s was known as the Busy Bs, as it included; Jim Bacon, Arthur Binks, Billy Bowen, Joe Brittain and Harold Buck.

== Coaching career ==
Bacon coached Castleford in the 1928–29 season from Saturday 25 August 1928 to Saturday 27 April 1929, Castleford finished 21st out of 28 clubs in the Championship, and reached the semi-final of the 1928–29 Challenge Cup, losing 3-9 to the eventual runner-up Dewsbury on Saturday 6 April 1929.

== Genealogical information ==
Bacon's marriage to Vera (née Tatterson) was registered during second ¼ 1927 in Bramley district. They had children; Courtney J. Bacon , and Glenys O. Bacon .
