= Tom Bush (rugby league) =

English rugby league footballer

Personal information
- Full name: Thomas Bush
- Born: 25 January 1990 (age 36) England
- Height: 5 ft 11 in (1.80 m)
- Weight: 11 st 9 lb (74 kg)

Playing information
- Position: Wing, Fullback
Club
| Years | Team | Pld | T | G | FG | P |
|---|---|---|---|---|---|---|
| 2010 | Leeds Rhinos | 4 | 1 | 0 | 0 | 4 |
| 2011–12 | York City Knights | 43 | 11 | 32 | 0 | 108 |
| 2013 | Hunslet Hawks | 7 | 3 | 0 | 0 | 12 |
| | Total | 54 | 15 | 32 | 0 | 124 |
- Source: As of 6 April 2010

Tom "Bushy" Bush (born 25 January 1990) is an English rugby league footballer who has played in the 2010s. He has played at club level for Milford Marlins ARLFC, in the Super League for the Leeds Rhinos, for the York City Knights and Hunslet Hawks, as a fullback or wing.

== Background ==
Tom Bush was born in England, he trained as an apprentice plumber on a part-time basis, and as of 2012 he has worked with his father, John, as a plumber and a plasterer for the A&T Heating Services (named after John and Kathy Bush's sons Andrew and Tom).

== Playing career ==
Bush made his début for the Leeds Rhinos, and scored a try in the 62-4 victory over the Harlequins RL in the Super League at Headingley, Leeds on Saturday 6 March 2010.
