= Arthur Binks =

England international rugby league footballer

Personal information
- Full name: Arthur Fowler Binks
- Born: 10 January 1902 Bramley district, England
- Died: third ¼ 1969 (aged 67) Leeds district, England

Playing information
- Position: Stand-off, Scrum-half
Club
Years	Team	Pld	T	G	FG	P
1920–27	Leeds	185	18	0	0	54
1927–31	Wigan	119	13	0	0	39
1931–34	Bradford Northern	30	4	0	0	12
	Total	334	35	0	0	105
Representative
Years	Team	Pld	T	G	FG	P
1929	England	1	0	0	0	0

Arthur Binks (10 January 1902 – 1969) was an English professional rugby league footballer who played in the 1920s and 1930s. He played at representative level for England, and at club level for Buslingthorpe Vale ARLFC (in Leeds), Leeds, Wigan and Bradford Northern, as a stand-off, or scrum-half.

== Background ==
Arthur Binks' birth was registered in Bramley district, West Riding of Yorkshire, and his death aged 67, was registered in Leeds district, West Riding of Yorkshire, England.

== Playing career ==
=== Leeds ===
The Leeds backline in the early 1920s was known as the Busy Bs, as it included; Jim Bacon, Arthur Binks, Billy Bowen, Joe Brittain and Harold Buck.

Binks played stand-off in Leeds' 28–3 victory over Hull F.C. in the 1922–23 Challenge Cup Final during the 1922–23 season at Belle Vue, Wakefield, the only occasion the Challenge Cup final has ever been staged at Belle Vue,

=== Wigan ===
Binks made his début for Wigan in the 5–11 defeat by Leigh at Mather Lane (adjacent to the Bridgewater Canal), Leigh on Saturday 1 October 1927, he scored his first try for Wigan in the 12–5 victory over Warrington in the 1927–28 Lancashire Cup semi-final at Central Park, Wigan on Wednesday 2 November 1927, he scored his last try for Wigan in the 20–8 victory over Wigan Highfield at Tunstall Lane, Wigan on Saturday 18 October 1930, and he played his last match for Wigan in the 42–0 victory over Widnes at Central Park, Wigan on Saturday 21 March 1931.

Binks played stand-off in Wigan's 5–4 victory over Widnes in the 1928–29 Lancashire Cup Final during the 1928–29 season at Wilderspool Stadium, Warrington on Saturday 24 November 1928.

He played in Wigan's 13–2 victory over Dewsbury in the 1928–29 Challenge Cup Final during the 1928-29 season at Wembley Stadium, London on Saturday 4 May 1929.

=== International honours ===
Binks won a cap for England while at Wigan in 1929 against Other Nationalities.
