= Steve Pilgrim (rugby) =

English rugby footballer (born 1967)

- Full name: Steve Pilgrim
- Born: 26 October 1967 (age 59)

Rugby union career
- Position: Fullback
Senior career
| Years | Team | Apps | (Points) |
| – | Wasps RFC | | |

Steve Pilgrim is an English former rugby union and rugby league footballer, who played rugby union for Wasps and England B.

In 1993, Pilgrim was banned from rugby union for a year. At the time, the Rugby Football Union had a stance of banning players who played rugby league: at the time, league was a professional code and union was amateur. By playing as an anonymous triallist in a reserve match for Leeds, Pilgrim fell foul of the disciplinary code.

The Leeds coach, Doug Laughton, stressed that Pilgrim had only received expenses for his game against Wakefield Trinity on Tuesday night. "There will be 10 or 15 players at Cardiff Arms Park who have earned a lot more from rugby than Steve Pilgrim," he said.
