= List of Leeds Rhinos players with honours =

These Leeds Rhinos players have either; won Challenge Cup, Rugby Football League Championship/Super League Grand Final, Yorkshire County Cup, Yorkshire League, played during Super League, or were international representatives before, or after, their time at Leeds.

== A ==
- Carl Ablett
- Matt Adamson circa-2000s
- Danny Allan
- Luke Ambler
- Kyle Amor
- Paul Anderson
- George Andrews circa-1920s

== B ==
- Éric Anselme circa-2000s
- Sam Backo
- James "Jim" Bacon circa-1920s
- Marcus Bai circa-2000s
- Billy Banks
- Dwayne Barker
- Edward "Ted" Barnard (#10) circa-1970
- David Barnhill circa-1990s
- Dean Bell circa-1990s
- Paul Bell circa-1990s
- Anthony "Tony" Binder circa-1970s
- John Wilkinson Birch circa-1900s
- Richie Blackmore circa-1990s
- Liam Botham circa-2000s
- Billy Bowen circa-1920s
- George Broughton Jr. (Junior) circa-1950s
- Jodie Broughton
- Archibald "Archie" Brown
- Gavin Brown circa-1990s
- Harold Buck circa-1920s
- Danny Buderus
- Luke Burgess
- Anthony "Tony" Burke circa-1980s
- John Burke
- Chris Burton
- Joe "Chimpy" Busch circa-1930s
- Tom Bush
- Ikram Butt

== C ==
- John "Dinny" Campbell circa-1910s
- Phil Cantillon
- Tonie Carroll circa-2000s
- Aubrey Casewell
- Leslie Chamberlain
- Joe Chandler
- Chris Chapman circa-1990s
- Chris Clarkson
- Geoffrey Clarkson
- Malcolm Clift
- Bradley Clyde circa-2000s
- Michael Coady
- Craig Coleman
- Wayne Collins circa-1990s
- Gary Connolly
- Mark Conway circa-1980s
- Bert Cook circa-1940s
- Ronald "Ron" Cowan, for Scotland (RU) while at Selkirk RFC (RU) 1961–62 5-caps (signed for Leeds 1962–63)
- Tony Currie

== D ==
- John Davies
- Brett Delaney
- Kevin Dick
- Paul Dixon
- Scott Donald
- Ewan Dowes circa-2000s
- Bill Drake
- Andrew Dunemann circa-2000s
- James "Jimmy" Dunn circa-1940s

== E ==
- Greg Eastwood
- Graham Eccles circa-1970s
- Morvin Edwards
- Andrew Ettingshausen
- Ken Eyre circa-1960s
- Esene Faimalo circa-1990s

== F ==
- James "Jim" Fallon circa-1990s
- Vince Fawcett circa-1980s
- Chris Feather circa-2000s
- Jamie Field circa-1990s
- Mike Forshaw circa-1990s
- Peter Fox
- Nick Fozzard circa-1990s
- Norman Francis circa-1980s
- Wally Fullerton Smith
- David Furner circa-2000s

== G ==
- John Gallager
- Tommy Gallagher
- Andrew "Andy" Gascoigne circa-1986
- Anthony Gibbons circa-1990s
- Carl Gibson
- Damian Gibson circa-1990s
- Marc Glanville circa-1990s
- Richard Goddard
- Brad Godden circa-1990s
- Jason Golden
- Marvin Golden circa-1990s
- Andy Goodway
- Andy Gregory
- Eric Grothe, Sr.

== H ==
- Neil Hague circa-1970s
- Michael Haley
- Carl Hall circa-1990s
- Ryan Hall
- Zak Hardaker
- Alan Hardisty
- Paul Harkin
- Neil Harmon circa-1990s
- Eric C. Harris (#2) circa-1932
- Phil Hassan circa-1990s
- Andy Hay circa-2000s
- Garry Hemingway circa-1950s
- Jonny Hepworth circa-2000s
- Cavill Heugh
- David Heselwood circa-1970s
- Vic Hey circa-1930s
- Merv Hicks
- Graham Holroyd circa-1990s
- Alan Horsfall circa-1940s
- Adam Hughes circa-1990s
- Brian Hughes circa-1970s
- David Hulme circa-1990s

== I ==
- Craig Innes circa-1990s

== J ==
- David James
- William James
- David Jenkins
- David "Dai" Morgan Jenkins circa-1930s
- Edgar Jones
- Iorwerth Jones
- Johnny Jones
- Ben Jones-Bishop

== K ==
- Ben Kaye circa-2000s
- John "Jack" Kelly 1930s...40s
- Andrew "Andy" Kirk circa-2000s
- Ian Kirke

== L ==
- Bob Landers
- Ali Lauitiiti
- Joseph Lavery circa-1910s
- Dean Lawford circa-1990s
- Jack Lendill circa-1950s
- Peter Lendill circa-1950s
- Kylie Leuluai
- Alan Lockwood circa-1960s
- James Lowes circa-1980s
- Cliff Lyons

== M ==
- Nathan McAvoy circa-2000s
- Wayne McDonald circa-2000s
- Wayne McDonald
- Danny McGuire
- Graham Mackay
- Chris McKenna circa-2000s
- Paul McShane
- Dane Manning
- Martin Masella circa-1990s
- Richard Mathers
- Jamie Mathiou circa-1990s
- Joe Mbu
- Robbie Mears circa-2000s
- Paul Medley circa-1980s
- Gary Mercer circa-1990s
- Shane Millard circa-2000s
- Sean Miller circa-1970s
- Jeff Moores circa-1920s...30s
- Ralph Morgan
- Steve Morris
- Gareth Morton circa-2000s
- Brett Mullins circa-2000s
- Bryan Murrell circa-1970s
- Scott Murrell

== N ==
- Terrence "Terry" Naylor circa-1970s
- Jason Netherton
- John "Jack" Newbound circa-1940s
- Samuel "Sam" Newbound circa-1930s

== O ==
- Mark O'Neill circa-2000s
- Frank O'Rourke circa-1920s
- Willie Oulton

== P ==
- Daniel Pascoe
- Jamie Peacock
- Nathan Picchi circa-1990s
- Stephen "Steve" Pitchford circa-1970s
- Jay Pitts
- Willie Poching circa-2000s
- Daryl Powell circa-1990s
- William "Billy" Pratt circa-1950s
- Paul Prendiville
- Bernard Prior circa-1950s

== R ==
- Michael Ratu
- Gareth Raynor
- Alan Rees
- George Rees
- Leroy Rivett circa-1990s
- Russell Robins
- Kenneth "Ken" Rollin
- Harold Rowe circa-1910s

== S ==
- Christopher "Chris" Sanderson circa-1970s
- Danny Sculthorpe
- Brian Shaw
- Ryan Sheridan circa-2000s
- Trevor Skerrett circa-1986
- Fred Smith
- Andy Speak circa-1990s
- Gary Spencer circa-1980s
- Johnny Swift circa-1950s

== T ==
- Alan Tait circa-1990s
- Jordan Tansey circa-2000s
- Jamie Thackray circa-2000s
- Ken Thornett circa-1960s
- Clinton Toopi circa-2000s
- David Tootill
- Peter Tunks
- Alex Turpin circa-2000s

== V ==
- Adrian Vowles circa-2000s

== W ==
- Anthony "Tony" Wainwright (#6) circa-1970
- Ben Walker
- Joe Walsh
- Shaun Wane
- Danny Ward circa-2000s
- Dennis Warrior circa-1940s
- Kallum Watkins
- Frank Watson circa-1940s
- Brent Webb circa-2000s
- Evan Williams circa-1920s
- Arthur Wood (#9) circa-1954
- Simon Worrall
- David "Dave" Wrench circa-1990s
- Thomas Wright, for Scotland (RU) while at Hawick RFC (RU) 1947 1-cap (signed for Leeds 1948–49)

== Y ==
- Dai Young
