= 1996 Leeds RLFC season =

- Super League I Rank: 10th
- Challenge Cup: Semi final
- 1996 record: Wins: 9; draws: 0; losses: 17
- Points scored: For: 555; against: 745

Team information
- Head Coach: Dean Bell
- Captain: Garry Schofield (until March) Neil Harmon (from March)
- Stadium: Headingley Rugby Stadium
← 1995–96	List of seasons	1997 →

The 1996 Leeds RLFC season was the club's first season in the newly formed Super League. Coached by Dean Bell, the club competed in Super League I and finished in 10th place. The club also competed in the 1996 Challenge Cup, and were knocked out in the semi-finals by Bradford Bulls. At the end of the season, the club changed its name to Leeds Rhinos.

== Challenge Cup ==
Date and time	Round	Versus	H/A	Venue	Result	Score	Tries	Goals	Attendance	TV	Report
4 February; 15:00 (Note: Postponed from 28 January due to heavy snow.)	Round 4	Swinton Lions	A	Gigg Lane	W	27–22	Fallon, Hall, Holroyd, Morley, Tait	Holroyd (3/5); Drop Goals: Holroyd	2,000	Not televised	
10 February	Round 5	Warrington Wolves	A	Wilderspool Stadium	W	30–10	Hall (2), Innes, Howard, Holroyd, Cummins	Holroyd (3/6)	3,886	Not televised	
25 February	Quarter-finals	Halifax Blue Sox	A	Thrum Hall	W	35–24	Mann (2), Cummins, A. Gibbons, Hassan, Morley, Iro	Holroyd (3/7); Drop Goals: Holroyd	7,451	Not televised	
23 March	Semi-finals	Bradford Bulls	N	Kirklees Stadium	L	6–28	Cummins	Holroyd (0/1 + 1 pen.)	17,139	BBC 1	

== Super League ==
=== Table ===
Super League I
Pos	Team	Pld	W	D	L	PF	PA	PD	Pts	Qualification or relegation
1	St Helens (C)	22	20	0	2	950	455	+495	40	Qualified for Premiership semi final
2	Wigan	22	19	1	2	902	326	+576	39	Qualified for Premiership semi final
3	Bradford Bulls	22	17	0	5	767	409	+358	34	Qualified for Premiership semi final
4	London Broncos	22	12	1	9	611	462	+149	25	Qualified for Premiership semi final
5	Warrington Wolves	22	12	0	10	569	565	+4	24	
6	Halifax Blue Sox	22	10	1	11	667	576	+91	21	
7	Sheffield Eagles	22	10	0	12	599	730	−131	20	
8	Oldham Bears	22	9	1	12	473	681	−208	19	
9	Castleford Tigers	22	9	0	13	548	599	−51	18	
10	Leeds	22	6	0	16	555	745	−190	12	
11	Paris Saint-Germain	22	3	1	18	398	795	−397	7	
12	Workington Town (R)	22	2	1	19	325	1021	−696	5	Relegated to Division One

Source: Rugby League Project
Rules for classification: 1) Points; 2) Points difference; 3) Number of points scored;
(C) Champions; (R) Relegated

== Transfers ==
=== Gains ===
Player	Club	Contract	Date
(New Zealand) Nathan Picchi	Hawke's Bay		April 1996
(New Zealand) Dean Clark	Counties Manukau Heroes		May 1996
(Tonga) Sateki Tuipulotu			May 1996
(England) Daivd Hulme	Widnes Vikings		June 1996
(England) Marcus St Hilaire	Huddersfield Giants		July 1996

=== Losses ===
Player	Club	Contract	Date
(New Zealand) Craig Innes	Manly-Warringah Sea Eagles		February 1996
(England) James Lowes	Bradford Bulls		February 1996
(England) Garry Schofield	Huddersfield Giants	4 years	February 1996

== Squad ==
1996 Leeds RLFC squad
First team squad			Coaching staff
1 (England) Francis Cummins – FB, CE, WG, HB; 2 (England) Jim Fallon – WG; 3 (New Zealand) Kevin Iro – CE; 4 (England) Carl Hall – CE; 5 (England) Marvin Golden – WG; 6 (New Zealand) Tony Kemp – SO; 7 (England) Graham Holroyd – HB, SO (gk); 8 (England) Neil Harmon (c) – PR; 9 (England) Mick Shaw – HK; 10 (England) Harvey Howard – PR; 11 (New Zealand) George Mann – SR, HB, PR; 12 (England) Adrian Morley – SR, LF; 13 (England) Mike Forshaw – LF, SR	14 (New Zealand) Gary Mercer – LF, SR, PR; 15 (England) Barrie McDermott – PR; 16 (England) Nick Fozzard – SR, PR; 18 (England) Phil Hassan – WG, CE; 20 (United States) Marcus Vassilakopoulos – HK; 21 (England) Matt Schultz – SR, LF; 22 (England) David Gibbons – SO, HB; 23 (England) Anthony Gibbons – FB, SO; 25 (Scotland) Alan Tait – FB, WG; 27 (England) Paul Gleadhill – WG; 28 (New Zealand) Nathan Picchi – LF; 29 (England) Terry Newton – HK, SR; 30 (New Zealand) Dean Clark – HB, LF, CE, SO	33 (England) Lee Maher – FB; 35 (England) Daivd Hulme – HK, LF; (New Zealand) Dean Bell – CE (Player-coach); (England) Gavin Brown – SO, SH; (New Zealand) Esene Faimalo – PR; (England) Jamie Field – SR, LF; (England) Patrick Handley – HK; (England) Adam Hughes – CE; (New Zealand) Craig Innes – CE; (England) Leroy Rivett – WG; (England) Garry Schofield – SO; (England) Marcus St Hilaire – SO; (Tonga) Sateki Tuipulotu – SO, CE	Head coach: (New Zealand) Dean Bell; Assistant coach: (New Zealand) Hugh McGahan; Legend: (c) Captain(s); (vc) Vice-captain(s); (gk) = Goal kicker; Updated: 1997; Source(s): Rothmans Rugby League Yearbook
