= 1997 Leeds Rhinos season =

- Super League II Rank: 5th
- Play-off result: Premiership Trophy Quarter final
- Challenge Cup: Semi final
- 1997 record: Wins: 17; draws: 1; losses: 10
- Points scored: For: 746; against: 583

Team information
- Coach: Dean Bell
- Stadium: Headingley
← 1996	List of seasons	1998 →

The 1997 Leeds Rhinos season was the 102nd season in the club's rugby league history and the second season in the Super League. Coached by Dean Bell, the Rhinos competed in Super League II and finished in 5th place. The club also competed in the 1997 Challenge Cup, but were knocked out in the semi-finals by Bradford Bulls.

== Table ==
Pos	Team	Pld	W	D	L	PF	PA	PD	Pts	Relegation
1	Bradford Bulls (C)	22	20	0	2	769	397	+372	40	
2	London Broncos	22	15	3	4	616	418	+198	33	
3	St Helens	22	14	1	7	592	506	+86	29	
4	Wigan	22	14	0	8	683	398	+285	28	
5	Leeds Rhinos	22	13	1	8	544	463	+81	27	
6	Salford Reds	22	11	0	11	428	495	−67	22	
7	Halifax Blue Sox	22	8	2	12	524	549	−25	18	
8	Sheffield Eagles	22	9	0	13	415	574	−159	18	
9	Warrington Wolves	22	8	0	14	437	647	−210	16	
10	Castleford Tigers	22	5	2	15	334	515	−181	12	
11	Paris Saint-Germain	22	6	0	16	362	572	−210	12	
12	Oldham Bears (R)	22	4	1	17	461	631	−170	9	Relegated to Division One

Source: Rugby League Project
Rules for classification: 1) Points; 2) Points difference; 3) Number of points scored;
(C) Champions; (R) Relegated

== Squad ==
No	Player	Apps	Tries	Goals	DGs	Points	Ref
1	Marcus St Hilaire	11	3	0	0	12	
2	Paul Sterling	30	20	0	0	80	
3	Richie Blackmore	23	10	0	0	40	
4	Francis Cummins	26	14	10	0	76	
5	Damian Gibson	28	6	0	0	24	
6	Tony Kemp	5	1	0	0	4	
7	Ryan Sheridan	23	3	0	0	12	
8	Martin Masella	29	3	0	0	12	
9	Wayne Collins	29	5	0	0	20	
10	Barrie McDermott	18	9	0	0	36	
11	Adrian Morley	27	5	0	0	20	
12	Anthony Farrell	32	9	0	0	36	
13	Iestyn Harris	25	7	77	1	183	
14	Graham Holroyd	32	6	37	3	101	
15	Phil Hassan	31	11	0	0	44	
16	Jamie Field	12	0	0	0	0	
18	Marvin Golden	9	3	0	0	12	
19	Dean Lawford	10	1	2	0	8	
20	Jamie Mathiou	26	0	0	0	0	
21	Terry Newton	26	2	0	0	8	
22	Leroy Rivett	13	6	0	0	24	
23	Adam Hughes	7	3	0	0	12	
24	Gary Mercer	26	6	0	0	24	
25	Gavin Brown	3	0	0	0	0	
26	Kris Smith	0	0	0	0	0	
31	Andy Hay	18	3	0	0	12	
32	Kevin Sinfield	2	0	0	0	0	

== Transfers ==
=== In ===
Player	Pos	From	Fee	Date	Ref
Anthony Farrell		Sheffield Eagles		December 1996	
Dean Lawford		Sheffield Eagles		December 1996	
Ryan Sheridan		Sheffield Eagles		December 1996	
Paul Sterling		Hull F.C.		December 1996	
Phil Cantillon	Hooker	Keighley Cougars	£25,000	July 1997	
Daryl Powell	Stand-off	Keighley Cougars	£25,000	July 1997	
Robert Roberts	Loose forward	Keighley Cougars	£25,000	July 1997	
Adrian Flynn	Centre	Keighley Cougars	£25,000	July 1997	
Simon Irving	Centre	Keighley Cougars	£25,000	July 1997	
David Larder	Second-row	Keighley Cougars	£25,000	July 1997	
Darren Fleary	Prop	Keighley Cougars	£25,000	July 1997	

=== Out ===
Player	Pos	To	Fee	Date	Ref
Neil Harmon		Huddersfield Giants		December 1996	
Matt Schultz		Hull F.C.		December 1996	
Nick Fozzard	Prop	Huddersfield Giants	£80,000	May 1997	
Jim Leatham	Second-row	Hull Sharks		May 1997	
