= 1994–95 Rugby League Premiership =

1994–95 Premiership
- Structure: National knockout championship
- Winners: Wigan
- Runners-up: Leeds

The 1995 Rugby League Premiership was the 21st end of season Rugby League Premiership competition. Played during the 1994–95 Rugby Football League season, the winners were Wigan. Kris Radlinski was named man-of-the-match so was awarded the Harry Sunderland Trophy.

== First round ==
Date	Team one	Team two	Score
5 May 1995	Leeds	Bradford Northern	50-30
7 May 1995	Castleford	Warrington	22-30
7 May 1995	St Helens	Halifax	32-16
7 May 1995	Wigan	Sheffield Eagles	48-16

== Semi-finals ==
Date	Team one	Team two	Score
12 May 1995	Wigan	Warrington	50-20
14 May 1995	Leeds	St Helens	30-26

== Final ==
21 May 1995

Wigan	69 – 12	Leeds
Tries: Connolly (3), Radlinski (3), Betts, Edwards, Hall, Haughton, Paul, Skerrett; Goals: Botica (10); Drop goals: Farrell		Tries: Eyres, Innes; Goals: Holroyd (2)

Old Trafford, Manchester
Attendance: 30,160
Referee: Stuart Cummings (Widnes)
Player of the Match: Kris Radlinski

1	Henry Paul
2	Jason Robinson
3	Kris Radlinski
4	Gary Connolly
5	Martin Offiah
6	Frano Botica
7	Shaun Edwards (c)
8	Kelvin Skerrett	(substituted off) 20'
9	Martin Hall
10	Neil Cowie
11	Denis Betts
12	Andy Farrell	(substituted off) 49'
13	Phil Clarke
Substitutions:
14	Mick Cassidy	(substituted in) 20'
15	Simon Haughton	(substituted in) 49'
Coach:
Graeme West

1	Alan Tait
2	Jim Fallon
3	Kevin Iro (c)
4	Phil Hassan	(substituted off) 40'
5	Francis Cummins
6	Craig Innes
7	Graham Holroyd
8	Harvey Howard	(substituted off) 29'
9	James Lowes
10	Esene Faimalo
11	George Mann
12	Richard Eyres
13	Gary Mercer
Substitutions:
14	Marcus Vassilakopoulos	(substituted in) 40'
15	Neil Harmon	(substituted in) 29'
Coach:
Doug Laughton
