= 2003 Super League season =

Season in rugby league

Super League VIII
- League: Super League
- Duration: 28 Rounds
- Teams: 12
- Highest attendance: 21,784; Bradford Bulls vs Leeds Rhinos (23 May)
- Lowest attendance: 1,276; Halifax vs London Broncos (22 Aug)
- Total attendance: 1,336,374 ▲ (average 7,955)
- Broadcast partners: Sky Sports

2003 Season
- Champions: Bradford Bulls; 3rd Super League title 5th British title
- League Leaders: Bradford Bulls
- Man of Steel: (England) Jamie Peacock
- Top point-scorer: (England) Paul Deacon (286)
- Top try-scorer: (Australia) Dennis Moran (24)

Promotion and relegation
- Promoted from National League One: Salford City Reds
- Relegated to National League One: Halifax

Tetley's Super League VIII was the official name for the year 2003's Super League championship season, the 109th season of top-level professional rugby league held in Britain, and the eighth championship run by Super League.

The season culminated in a replay of the 2001 Grand Final between Bradford Bulls and Wigan Warriors, and again Bradford won, claiming the 2003 Championship, their second in three years.

== Rule changes ==
- The knock-on rule was modified so that if in the referee's judgement a player did not play at the ball, a knock-on would not be given.
- Super League coaches voted 12-0 for new interchange and substitution rules for the 2003 season. The number of interchanges, which now included blood bins, increased from 6 to 12 using a pool of 4 substitutes. This change aimed to retain the element of wearing down a team's opponents during the game – which was considered part of the character of the sport. Stuart Cummings, the Rugby Football League's technical controller said the changes "bring us into line with the international rules" and ruled out future increases as well as declaring, "We will never see the unlimited interchange introduced into rugby league in Britain," a change that had caused controversy in Australia during its experiment there.

== Table ==
Pos	Team	Pld	W	D	L	PF	PA	PD	Pts	Qualification
1	Bradford Bulls (L, C)	28	22	0	6	878	529	+349	44	Semi Final
2	Leeds Rhinos	28	19	3	6	751	555	+196	41	Semi Final
3	Wigan Warriors	28	19	2	7	776	512	+264	40	Elimination Semi Final
4	St Helens	28	16	1	11	845	535	+310	31 (Note: St Helens deducted 2 points for salary cap breaches.)	Elimination Semi Final
5	London Broncos	28	14	2	12	643	696	−53	30	Elimination Semi Final
6	Warrington Wolves	28	14	1	13	748	619	+129	29	Elimination Semi Final
7	Hull F.C.	28	13	3	12	701	577	+124	27 (Note: Hull FC deducted 2 points for salary cap breaches.)	
8	Castleford Tigers	28	12	1	15	612	633	−21	25	
9	Widnes Vikings	28	12	1	15	640	727	−87	25	
10	Huddersfield Giants	28	11	1	16	628	715	−87	23	
11	Wakefield Trinity Wildcats	28	7	1	20	505	774	−269	15	
12	Halifax (R)	28	1	0	27	372	1227	−855	0 (Note: Halifax deducted 2 points for salary cap breaches.)	Relegation to National League One

Source: Rugby League Project
Rules for classification: 1) Points; 2) Points difference; 3) Number of points scored;
(C) Champions; (L) League Leaders' Shield Winners; (R) Relegated

== Play-offs ==
Elimination play-offs
3	Wigan Warriors	25
6	Warrington Wolves	12
4	St. Helens	24
5	London Broncos	6

Qualifying / Elimination semifinal
1	Bradford Bulls	30
2	Leeds Rhinos	14
Wigan Warriors	40
St. Helens	24

Elimination final
Leeds Rhinos	22
Wigan Warriors	23

Grand Final
Bradford Bulls	25
Wigan Warriors	12

Source: Rugby League Project

== Media ==
=== Television ===
This season was the final year of Sky Sports' contract with the Rugby Football League allowing them to broadcast matches exclusively live, the deal ended in November 2003.

== Records ==
On 2 March, Matt Crowther of Hull F.C. equalled the club record for goals in a match when he was successful 14 times against Sheffield Eagles.

== 2003 Transfers ==
=== Players ===
Player	2002 Club	2003 Club
Brandon Costin	Bradford Bulls	Huddersfield Giants
Brian McDermott	Bradford Bulls	Retirement
Richard Gay	Castleford Tigers	Retirement
Barrie-Jon Mather	Castleford Tigers	Kubota Spears (Japanese rugby union)
Gary Mercer	Castleford Tigers	Retirement
Kyle Warren	Castleford Tigers	Retirement
Jon Wells	Castleford Tigers	Wakefield Trinity Wildcats
Robbie Beckett	Halifax Blue Sox	NRL: Wests Tigers
Jamie Bloem	Halifax Blue Sox	Huddersfield Giants
Gavin Clinch	Halifax Blue Sox	Salford City Reds (National League One)
Andrew Dunemann	Halifax Blue Sox	Leeds Rhinos
Jason Flowers	Halifax Blue Sox	Salford City Reds (National League One)
Jim Gannon	Halifax Blue Sox	Huddersfield Giants
Brett Goldspink	Halifax Blue Sox	Retirement
Karle Hammond	Halifax Blue Sox	Retirement
Jamie Thackray	Halifax Blue Sox	Castleford Tigers
David Woods	Halifax Blue Sox	Retirement
Lee Jackson	Hull F.C.	York City Knights
Graham Mackay	Hull F.C.	Retirement
Tonie Carroll	Leeds Rhinos	NRL: Brisbane Broncos
Darren Fleary	Leeds Rhinos	Huddersfield Giants
Andy Hay	Leeds Rhinos	Widnes Vikings
Karl Pratt	Leeds Rhinos	Bradford Bulls
Ryan Sheridan	Leeds Rhinos	Widnes Vikings
Marcus St Hilaire	Leeds Rhinos	Huddersfield Giants
Adrian Vowles	Leeds Rhinos	Wakefield Trinity Wildcats
Ben Walker	Leeds Rhinos	NRL: Manly Warringah Sea Eagles
Richie Barnett	London Broncos	Hull F.C.
Wayne Evans	London Broncos	Retirement
Michael Gillett	London Broncos	Retirement
Jason Hetherington	London Broncos	Retirement
Mark Corvo	Salford City Reds	Retirement
Damian Gibson	Salford City Reds	Castleford Tigers
Michael Hancock	Salford City Reds	Retirement
Graham Holroyd	Salford City Reds	Huddersfield Giants
Warren Jowitt	Salford City Reds	Hull F.C.
Francis Maloney	Salford City Reds	Castleford Tigers
Jason Nicol	Salford City Reds	Retirement
Nick Pinkney	Salford City Reds	Hull Kingston Rovers (National League One)
Darren Shaw	Salford City Reds	Oldham (National League One)
Darren Treacy	Salford City Reds	NRL: Parramatta Eels
Mike Wainwright	Salford City Reds	Warrington Wolves
Darren Britt	St. Helens	Retirement
Sean Hoppe	St. Helens	Retirement
Sonny Nickle	St. Helens	Leigh Centurions (National League One)
Peter Shiels	St. Helens	Retirement
Deon Bird	Wakefield Trinity Wildcats	Widnes Vikings
Paul Broadbent	Wakefield Trinity Wildcats	York City Knights
Chris Feather	Wakefield Trinity Wildcats	Leeds Rhinos
Andrew Frew	Wakefield Trinity Wildcats	Halifax
Phil Hassan	Wakefield Trinity Wildcats	Swinton Lions
Paul Jackson	Wakefield Trinity Wildcats	Castleford Tigers
Neil Law	Wakefield Trinity Wildcats	York City Knights
Martin Moana	Wakefield Trinity Wildcats	Halifax
Kris Tassell	Wakefield Trinity Wildcats	Swinton Lions
Nathan Wood	Wakefield Trinity Wildcats	Warrington Wolves
Dean Busby	Warrington Wolves	Hull Kingston Rovers (National League One)
Dale Laughton	Warrington Wolves	Retirement
Paul Marquet	Warrington Wolves	Retirement
Matthew Rodwell	Warrington Wolves	Retirement
Steve Carter	Widnes Vikings	Retirement
Troy Stone	Widnes Vikings	Retirement
Craig Weston	Widnes Vikings	Hiatus
Gary Connolly	Wigan Warriors	Leeds Rhinos
David Furner	Wigan Warriors	Leeds Rhinos
Harvey Howard	Wigan Warriors	Hull Kingston Rovers (National League One)
Marvin Golden	Doncaster Dragons (Northern Ford Premiership)	Widnes Vikings
Chris Thorman	Huddersfield Giants (Northern Ford Premiership)	London Broncos
Matt Calland	Rochdale Hornets (Northern Ford Premiership)	Huddersfield Giants
Darren Smith	NRL: Canterbury-Bankstown Bulldogs	St. Helens
Colin Best	NRL: Cronulla-Sutherland Sharks	Hull F.C.
Nick Graham	NRL: Cronulla-Sutherland Sharks	Wigan Warriors
Chris McKenna	NRL: Cronulla-Sutherland Sharks	Leeds Rhinos
Paul Mellor	NRL: Cronulla-Sutherland Sharks	Castleford Tigers
Dean Treister	NRL: Cronulla-Sutherland Sharks	Hull F.C.
Ian Sibbit	NRL: Melbourne Storm	Warrington Wolves
Julian Bailey	NRL: Newcastle Knights	Huddersfield Giants
Clinton O'Brien	NRL: Newcastle Knights	Wakefield Trinity Wildcats
Bill Peden	NRL: Newcastle Knights	London Broncos
Shontayne Hape	NRL: New Zealand Warriors	Bradford Bulls
Anthony Colella	NRL: South Sydney Rabbitohs	Huddersfield Giants
Brent Grose	NRL: South Sydney Rabbitohs	Warrington Wolves
Jason Hooper	NRL: St. George Illawarra Dragons	St. Helens
Shane Millard	NRL: St. George Illawarra Dragons	Widnes Vikings
Dallas Hood	NRL: Sydney Roosters	Wakefield Trinity Wildcats
Ben Jeffries	NRL: Wests Tigers	Wakefield Trinity Wildcats
Matt Seers	NRL: Wests Tigers	Wakefield Trinity Wildcats
Quentin Pongia	Villeneuve Leopards (Elite One Championship)	Wigan Warriors
Neil Harmon	N/A	Halifax
Damian Kennedy	N/A	London Broncos

== See also ==
- 2003 Super League Grand Final
- 2003 World Club Challenge
