= 1994–95 Challenge Cup =

Rugby league competition

1994–95 Silk Cut Challenge Cup
- Duration: 8 Rounds
- Winners: Wigan
- Runners-up: Leeds
- Lance Todd Trophy: Jason Robinson

The 1994–95 Challenge Cup was the 94th staging of rugby league's oldest knockout competition, the Challenge Cup. Known as the Silk Cut Challenge Cup (due to sponsorship by Silk Cut cigarettes), the tournament commenced with the first round in December 1994 and culminated in March 1995's final between Wigan and Leeds at Wembley. Wigan won the match 30–10.

== First round ==
Date	Team One	Team Two	Score
10 December 1994	Askam	Moorends	10–15
10 December 1994	Barrow Island	Norland	26–8
10 December 1994	Beverley	Chequerfield	8–6
10 December 1994	Blackbrook	West Bowling	26–14
10 December 1994	Blackpool Gladiators	Fryston	27–14
10 December 1994	Dewsbury Celtic	Thatto Heath	6–22
10 December 1994	Dudley Hill	Cardiff Institute	54–4
10 December 1994	East Leeds	Wath Brow Hornets	22–14
10 December 1994	Eastmoor	Upton & Frickley	23–22
10 December 1994	Egremont	New Earswick	34–6
10 December 1994	Greetland AR	Crosfields	12–6
10 December 1994	Hemel	Leeds Met University	52–0
10 December 1994	Heworth	Littleborough	32–10
10 December 1994	Leigh East	Bisons	10–16
10 December 1994	Leigh Miners Rangers	Wigan St Judes	7–10
10 December 1994	Lock Lane	Orrell St James	36–8
10 December 1994	Mayfield	Park Amateurs	32–6
10 December 1994	Milford	Thornhill	12–20
10 December 1994	Millom	Northampton Knights	62–4
10 December 1994	Moldgreen	Embassy	30–14
10 December 1994	Nottingham	Normanton	0–36
10 December 1994	Oldham St Annes	Kells	20–24
10 December 1994	Oulton	Ovenden	12–8
10 December 1994	Redhill	Ellenborough	22–28
10 December 1994	Saddleworth	Skirlaugh	30–12
10 December 1994	Shaw Cross	Fulham Travellers	46–20
10 December 1994	West Hull	South London	48–10
10 December 1994	Woolston Rovers	Eccles	26–10
10 December 1994	York Acorn	Crown Malet	18–25
11 December 1994	Chorley Borough	Simms Cross	12–8
17 December 1994	Walney Island	Hensingham	4–14
17 December 1994	Wigan St Patricks	Worth Village	22–0

== Second round ==
Date	Team One	Team Two	Score
31 December 1994	Barrow Island	West Hull	19–12
31 December 1994	Beverley	Normanton	14–16
31 December 1994	Bisons	East Leeds	8–33
31 December 1994	Blackbrook	Chorley	0–23
31 December 1994	Blackpool Gladiators	Thornhill	0–28
31 December 1994	Eastmoor	Dudley Hill	8–16
31 December 1994	Ellenborough	Egremont	23–10
31 December 1994	Hensingham	Heworth	8–14
31 December 1994	Lock Lane	Mayfield	20–14
31 December 1994	Millom	Saddleworth	38–16
31 December 1994	Moorends	Thatto Heath	12–10
31 December 1994	Oulton	Kells	12–14
31 December 1994	Shaw Cross	Moldgreen	9–4
31 December 1994	Wigan St Judes	Hemel Hempstead	14–13
31 December 1994	Wigan St Patricks	Crown Malet	42–6
31 December 1994	Woolston Rovers	Greetland AR	14–4
14 January 1995	Beverley	Normanton	20–10

== Third round ==
Date	Team One	Team Two	Score
22 January 1995	Barrow	East Leeds	56–0
22 January 1995	Batley	Shaw Cross	32–4
22 January 1995	Bramley	Woolston Rovers	42–2
22 January 1995	Carlisle	Dudley Hill	34–4
22 January 1995	Highfield	Beverley	4–27
22 January 1995	Huddersfield	Wigan St Judes	44–10
22 January 1995	Hunslet	Wigan St Patricks	64–4
22 January 1995	Leigh	Heworth	40–28
22 January 1995	London	Ellenborough	30–10
22 January 1995	Rochdale Hornets	Lock Lane	48–16
22 January 1995	Ryedale-York	Barrow Island	50–20
22 January 1995	Swinton	Millom	30–10
22 January 1995	Whitehaven	Moorends	64–12
24 January 1995	Hull Kingston Rovers	Thornhill	58–6
24 January 1995	Keighley Cougars	Chorley Borough	68–0
3 February 1995	Dewsbury	Kells	72–12

== Fourth round ==
Date	Team One	Team Two	Score
11 February 1995	Wigan	St Helens	16–16
12 February 1995	Beverley	Batley	20–30
12 February 1995	Carlisle	Widnes	2–40
12 February 1995	Doncaster	Sheffield Eagles	12–22
12 February 1995	Featherstone Rovers	Barrow	50–22
12 February 1995	Huddersfield	Halifax	36–30
12 February 1995	Hunslet	Salford	32–32
12 February 1995	Keighley Cougars	Dewsbury	24–12
12 February 1995	Leeds	Bradford Northern	31–14
12 February 1995	London	Hull Kingston Rovers	20–26
12 February 1995	Oldham	Bramley	70–10
12 February 1995	Ryedale-York	Rochdale Hornets	18–12
12 February 1995	Warrington	Castleford	17–2
12 February 1995	Whitehaven	Wakefield Trinity	24–12
12 February 1995	Workington Town	Hull F.C.	30–6
15 February 1995	St Helens	Wigan	24–40
15 February 1995	Salford	Hunslet	52–10
19 February 1995	Swinton	Leigh	22–34

== Fifth round ==
Date	Team One	Team Two	Score
25 February 1995	Workington Town	Leigh	94–4
26 February 1995	Keighley Cougars	Huddersfield	0–30
26 February 1995	Salford	Featherstone Rovers	10–30
26 February 1995	Batley	Wigan	4–70
26 February 1995	Leeds	Ryedale-York	44–14
26 February 1995	Warrington	Oldham	6–17
26 February 1995	Hull Kingston Rovers	Whitehaven	14–18
26 February 1995	Sheffield	Widnes	7–19

== Quarter-finals ==
Date	Team One	Team Two	Score
11 March 1995	Leeds	Workington Town	23–12
12 March 1995	Oldham	Huddersfield	10–29
12 March 1995	Whitehaven	Featherstone Rovers	14–42
12 March 1995	Widnes	Wigan	12–26

== Semi finals ==
25 March 1995

Wigan	48 – 20	Oldham
Try: Connolly (3), Betts (2), Tuigamala (2), Edwards, Mather; Goal: Botica (6)	Report	Try: Belle (2), Bradbury, Sherratt; Goal: Marsh (2)

Alfred McAlpine Stadium, Huddersfield
Attendance: 12,749

1 April 1995

Leeds	39 – 22	Featherstone Rovers
Try: Fallon (2), Hanley (2), Holroyd, Schofield, Tait; Goal: Holroyd (5); Drop goal: Schofield	Report	Try: Butt, Calland, Divet, Southernwood; Goal: Aston (3)

Elland Road, Leeds
Attendance: 21,485

== Final ==
The 1995 Silk Cut Challenge Cup Final was a replay of the previous season's final between Wigan and Leeds. The match was played at 2:30pm on the dry Saturday afternoon of 29 April 1995 at London's Wembley Stadium. This was the first Wembley Challenge Cup Final to use in-goal judges.

29 April 1995

Wigan	30 – 10	Leeds
Try: Robinson (2), Hall, Paul, Tuigamala; Goal: Botica (5)		Try: Lowes; Goal: Holroyd (3)

Wembley, London
Attendance: 78,550
Referee: Russell Smith (Castleford)
Player of the Match: Jason Robinson

FB	1	Henry Paul
RW	2	Jason Robinson
RC	3	Va'aiga Tuigamala
LC	4	Gary Connolly
LW	5	Martin Offiah
SO	6	Frano Botica
SH	7	Shaun Edwards (c)
PR	8	Kelvin Skerrett	(substituted off) 53'
HK	9	Martin Hall
PR	10	Neil Cowie
SR	11	Denis Betts
SR	12	Mick Cassidy	(substituted off) 9'
LF	13	Phil Clarke
Substitutions:
IC	14	Paul Atcheson	(substituted in) 53'
IC	15	Andy Farrell	(substituted in) 9'
Coach:
Graeme West

FB	1	Alan Tait
RW	2	Jim Fallon
RC	3	Kevin Iro
LC	4	Craig Innes
LW	5	Francis Cummins
SO	6	Garry Schofield
SH	7	Graham Holroyd
PR	8	Harvey Howard	(substituted off) 30'
HK	9	James Lowes
PR	10	Esene Faimalo	(substituted off) 53'
SR	11	Gary Mercer
SR	12	Richard Eyres
LF	13	Ellery Hanley (c)
Substitutions:
IC	14	George Mann	(substituted in) 30'
IC	15	Neil Harmon	(substituted in) 53'
Coach:
Doug Laughton
