= 1993–94 Challenge Cup =

Rugby league competition

1993–94 Silk Cut Challenge Cup
- Duration: 8 Rounds
- Winners: Wigan
- Runners-up: Leeds
- Lance Todd Trophy: Martin Offiah

The 1993–94 Challenge Cup was the 93rd staging of rugby league's oldest knockout competition, the Challenge Cup. Known as the Silk Cut Challenge Cup for sponsorship reasons, the final was contested by Wigan and Leeds at Wembley. Wigan won the match 26–16.

== First round ==
| Date | Team One | Team Two | Score |
|---|---|---|---|
| 4 Dec 1993 | Askam | Orchard Park | 36-20 |
| 4 Dec 1993 | Barrow Island | Moorends | 26-13 |
| 4 Dec 1993 | Beverley | Cambridge E | 84-10 |
| 4 Dec 1993 | Blackbrook | London Colonials | Walkover |
| 4 Dec 1993 | Dewsbury Celtic | Fulham Travellers | 38-15 |
| 4 Dec 1993 | Dudley Hill | Thatto Heath | 8-22 |
| 4 Dec 1993 | East Leeds | Kells | 25-12 |
| 4 Dec 1993 | Eastmoor | Irlam | 4-12 |
| 4 Dec 1993 | Egremont | Ace Amateurs | 28-6 |
| 4 Dec 1993 | Greetland AR | Ellenborough | 0-18 |
| 4 Dec 1993 | Hemel | Hensingham | 18-22 |
| 4 Dec 1993 | Heworth | Wigan St Judes | 24-8 |
| 4 Dec 1993 | Leigh East | Farnworth | 14-10 |
| 4 Dec 1993 | Leigh Miners Welfare | Eureka | 34-14 |
| 4 Dec 1993 | Lock Lane | Myson | 13-16 |
| 4 Dec 1993 | Mayfield | Hull Dockers | 24-12 |
| 4 Dec 1993 | Milford | Cardiff Institute | 18-8 |
| 4 Dec 1993 | Millom | Westgate Redoubt | 18-10 |
| 4 Dec 1993 | Moldgreen | Skirlaugh | 23-5 |
| 4 Dec 1993 | Nottingham | Clayton | 8-24 |
| 4 Dec 1993 | Oldham St Annes | Bisons | 32-8 |
| 4 Dec 1993 | Oulton | Queens | 27-6 |
| 4 Dec 1993 | Redhill | Littleborough | 16-12 |
| 4 Dec 1993 | Saddleworth | Seaton Rangers | 13-2 |
| 4 Dec 1993 | Shaw Cross | Fryston | 12-6 |
| 4 Dec 1993 | Walney Central | Simms Cross | 11-0 |
| 4 Dec 1993 | West Hull | Ovenden | 36-9 |
| 4 Dec 1993 | Wigan St Patricks | Wath Brow Hornets | 13-6 |
| 4 Dec 1993 | Woolston | Upton & Frickley | 54-12 |
| 4 Dec 1993 | York Acorn | Orrell St James | 32-32 |
| 5 Dec 1993 | Blackpool Gladiators | Park Amateurs | 10-28 |
| 5 Dec 1993 | Chorley Borough | Elland | 30-2 |
| 11 Dec 1993 | Orrell St James | York Acorn | 24-5 |

== Second round ==
| Date | Team One | Team Two | Score |
|---|---|---|---|
| 18 Dec 1993 | Askam | Chorley Borough | 8-3 |
| 18 Dec 1993 | Blackbrook | Beverley | 8-17 |
| 18 Dec 1993 | Clayton | Oulton | 6-23 |
| 18 Dec 1993 | East Leeds | Egremont | 14-10 |
| 18 Dec 1993 | Ellenborough | Woolston | 4-9 |
| 18 Dec 1993 | Hensingham | Myson | 40-0 |
| 18 Dec 1993 | Leigh East | Millom | 14-26 |
| 18 Dec 1993 | Leigh Miners Welfare | Moldgreen | 13-11 |
| 18 Dec 1993 | Mayfield | Wigan St Patricks | 14-32 |
| 18 Dec 1993 | Milford | Irlam | 19-20 |
| 18 Dec 1993 | Redhill | Orrell St James | 32-18 |
| 18 Dec 1993 | Saddleworth | Oldham St Annes | 12-4 |
| 18 Dec 1993 | Shaw Cross | Thatto Heath | 11-4 |
| 18 Dec 1993 | Walney Central | Barrow Island | 4-6 |
| 18 Dec 1993 | West Hull | Park Amateurs | 47-14 |
| 3 Jan 1994 | Dewsbury Celtic | Heworth | 18-10 |

== Third round ==
| Date | Team One | Team Two | Score |
|---|---|---|---|
| 15 Jan 1994 | Batley | Dewsbury | 58-2 |
| 16 Jan 1994 | Barrow | East Leeds | 34-10 |
| 16 Jan 1994 | Bramley | Redhill | 46-20 |
| 16 Jan 1994 | Carlisle | Askam | 42-8 |
| 16 Jan 1994 | Dewsbury | Hensingham | 64-6 |
| 16 Jan 1994 | Doncaster | Wigan St Patricks | 36-4 |
| 16 Jan 1994 | Highfield | Saddleworth | 16-13 |
| 16 Jan 1994 | Huddersfield | Woolston | 42-6 |
| 16 Jan 1994 | Hunslet | Barrow Island | 58-2 |
| 16 Jan 1994 | Keighley | Oulton | 68-0 |
| 16 Jan 1994 | London | Shaw Cross | 40-14 |
| 16 Jan 1994 | Rochdale Hornets | Millom | 32-0 |
| 16 Jan 1994 | Ryedale-York | Leigh Miners Welfare | 52-2 |
| 16 Jan 1994 | Swinton | Irlam | 30-0 |
| 16 Jan 1994 | Whitehaven | West Hull | 44-4 |
| 16 Jan 1994 | Workington Town | Beverley | 24-10 |

== Fourth round ==
| Date | Team One | Team Two | Score |
|---|---|---|---|
| 29 Jan 1994 | Halifax | Warrington | 18-22 |
| 30 Jan 1994 | Barrow | Bradford Northern | 30-58 |
| 30 Jan 1994 | Batley | Keighley | 8-29 |
| 30 Jan 1994 | Bramley | Widnes | 11-20 |
| 30 Jan 1994 | Carlisle | Workington Town | 12-13 |
| 30 Jan 1994 | Castleford | Salford | 36-4 |
| 30 Jan 1994 | Doncaster | Dewsbury | 18-6 |
| 30 Jan 1994 | Highfield | Whitehaven | 4-15 |
| 30 Jan 1994 | Huddersfield | St Helens | 16-23 |
| 30 Jan 1994 | Hull Kingston Rovers | Ryedale-York | 16-6 |
| 30 Jan 1994 | Hunslet | Oldham | 20-30 |
| 30 Jan 1994 | London | Featherstone Rovers | 14-28 |
| 30 Jan 1994 | Rochdale Hornets | Leeds | 18-40 |
| 30 Jan 1994 | Sheffield Eagles | Leigh | 42-10 |
| 30 Jan 1994 | Swinton | Hull FC | 12-18 |
| 30 Jan 1994 | Wigan | Wakefield Trinity | 24-16 |

== Fifth round ==
| Date | Team One | Team Two | Score |
|---|---|---|---|
| 12 Feb 1994 | Hull F.C. | Wigan | 21-22 |
| 13 Feb 1994 | Doncaster | Oldham | 20-0 |
| 13 Feb 1994 | Widnes | Sheffield | 22-6 |
| 13 Feb 1994 | Leeds | Warrington | 38-4 |
| 13 Feb 1994 | Castleford | Keighley | 52-14 |
| 13 Feb 1994 | Featherstone Rovers | Hull Kingston Rovers | 30-8 |
| 13 Feb 1994 | St Helens | Whitehaven | 46-4 |
| 13 Feb 1994 | Bradford Northern | Workington Town | 32-0 |

== Quarter-finals ==
| Date | Team One | Team Two | Score |
|---|---|---|---|
| 26 Feb 1994 | Wigan | Featherstone Rovers | 32-14 |
| 27 Feb 1994 | Castleford | Widnes | 30-6 |
| 27 Feb 1994 | Leeds | Bradford Northern | 33-10 |
| 27 Feb 1994 | St Helens | Doncaster | 40-9 |

== Semi finals ==
12 March 1994

| Wigan | 20 – 6 | Castleford |
|---|---|---|
| Try: Botica, Atcheson, Offiah; Goal: Botica (4) | Report | Try: Kemp; Goal: Crooks |

Headingley, Leeds
Attendance: 17,049

26 March 1994

| Leeds | 20 – 8 | St. Helens |
|---|---|---|
| Try: Eyres, Hanley (2); Goal: Holroyd (4) | Report | Try: Martyn; Goal: Martyn (2) |

Central Park, Wigan
Attendance: 20,771

== Final ==
30 April 1994

| Wigan | 26 – 16 | Leeds |
|---|---|---|
| Try: Offiah (2) 13', 64'; Farrell 27'; Panapa 71'; Goal: Botica (5) | Report | Try: Fallon 49'; Schofield 52'; Cummins 78'; Goal: Holroyd (2) |

Wembley, London
Attendance: 78,348
Player of the Match: Martin Offiah

| FB | 1 | (England) Gary Connolly |
| RW | 2 | (Samoa) Va'aiga Tuigamala |
| RC | 3 | (New Zealand) Dean Bell (c) |
| LC | 4 | (England) Barrie-Jon Mather |
| LW | 5 | (England) Martin Offiah |
| SO | 6 | (New Zealand) Frano Botica |
| SH | 7 | (England) Shaun Edwards |
| PR | 8 | (Wales) Kelvin Skerrett |
| HK | 9 | (England) Martin Dermott |
| PR | 10 | (England) Andy Platt |
| SR | 11 | (England) Denis Betts |
| SR | 12 | (England) Andy Farrell |
| LF | 13 | (England) Phil Clarke |
Substitutions:
| IC | 14 | (New Zealand) Sam Panapa |
| IC | 15 | (England) Mick Cassidy |
Coach:
John Dorahy

| FB | 1 | (Scotland) Alan Tait |
| RW | 2 | (England) Jim Fallon |
| RC | 3 | (New Zealand) Kevin Iro |
| LC | 4 | (New Zealand) Craig Innes |
| LW | 5 | (England) Francis Cummins |
| SO | 6 | (England) Graham Holroyd |
| SH | 7 | (England) Garry Schofield |
| PR | 8 | (Republic of Ireland) Neil Harmon |
| HK | 9 | (Republic of Ireland) James Lowes |
| PR | 10 | (England) Harvey Howard |
| SR | 11 | (New Zealand) Gary Mercer |
| SR | 12 | (England) Richie Eyres |
| LF | 13 | (England) Ellery Hanley (c) |
Substitutions:
| IC | 14 | (United States) Marcus Vassilakopoulos |
| IC | 15 | (England) Mike O'Neill |
Coach:
Doug Laughton
