= David Gibbons =

David or Dave Gibbons may also refer to:

- David Gibbons (politician) (1927–2014), Bermudian politician and businessman
- David Gibbons (figure skater) in 1998 United States Figure Skating Championships
- David Gibbons (rugby league) in 1996 Leeds RLFC season
- Dave Gibbons (born 1949), an English comic book artist.
- Dave Gibbons (sailor) on B14

== See also ==
- David Gibbins (born 1962), archaeologist and writer
