= Matt Schultz (disambiguation) =

Matt Schultz is an American attorney and politician.

Matt Schultz or Matthew Schultz may also refer to:

- Matt Schultz, South Australian politician
- Matthew Schultz, musician
- Matt Schultz (rugby league), player in 1996 Leeds RLFC season
- Matt Schultz, American pastor

== See also ==
- Matt Schulz, American drummer
- Matt Schulze (born 1972), American actor
- Matt Shultz, lead singer for Cage the Elephant
- Matthew Schulz, student of Benjamin Drake Wright
