= 1992–93 Challenge Cup =

Rugby league competition

1993 Silk Cut Challenge Cup
- Duration: 6 Rounds
- Broadcast partners: BBC
- Winners: Wigan
- Runners-up: Widnes
- Lance Todd Trophy: Dean Bell

The 1993 Challenge Cup was the 92nd staging of rugby league's oldest knockout competition, the Challenge Cup. Known as the Silk Cut Challenge Cup for sponsorship reasons, the final was contested by Wigan and Widnes at Wembley. Wigan won the match 20–14. This the first time that the final had been contested by 2 teams who had played in the preliminary round and this was the last time that the preliminary round would be played

== Preliminary round ==
| Date | Team One | Team Two | Score |
|---|---|---|---|
| 13 January 1993 | Widnes | Swinton | 62-14 |
| 17 January 1993 | Batley | Blackpool | 20-10 |
| 17 January 1993 | Wigan | Hull FC | 40-2 |

== First round ==
| Date | Team One | Team Two | Score |
|---|---|---|---|
| 30 January 1993 | Warrington | Castleford | 6-21 |
| 31 January 1993 | Bradford Northern | Workington Town | 28-18 |
| 31 January 1993 | Chorley Borough | Batley | 6-20 |
| 31 January 1993 | Dewsbury | Wigan | 4-20 |
| 30 January 1993 | Featherstone Rovers | St Helens | 22-24 |
| 31 January 1993 | Halifax | Carlisle | 66-16 |
| 31 January 1993 | Huddersfield | Nottingham | 66-1 |
| 31 January 1993 | Hull Kingston Rovers | Bramley | 30-0 |
| 31 January 1993 | Hunslet | Ryedale-York | 27-22 |
| 31 January 1993 | Keighley | Highfield | 86-0 |
| 31 January 1993 | Leeds | Barrow | 54-18 |
| 31 January 1993 | Oldham | London | 34-6 |
| 31 January 1993 | Rochdale Hornets | Doncaster | 34-13 |
| 31 January 1993 | Salford | Wakefield Trinity | 12-20 |
| 31 January 1993 | Sheffield Eagles | Leigh | 32-5 |
| 31 January 1993 | Whitehaven | Widnes | 8-20 |

== Second round ==
| Date | Team One | Team Two | Score |
|---|---|---|---|
| 13 February 1993 | Sheffield | Widnes | 6-52 |
| 14 February 1993 | Wakefield Trinity | Bradford Northern | 18-20 |
| 14 February 1993 | Wigan | St Helens | 23-3 |
| 14 February 1993 | Hull Kingston Rovers | Keighley | 30-28 |
| 14 February 1993 | Halifax | Batley | 30-20 |
| 14 February 1993 | Oldham | Huddersfield | 20-17 |
| 14 February 1993 | Castleford | Hunslet | 34-16 |
| 17 February 1993 | Leeds | Rochdale | 68-6 |

== Quarter-finals ==
| Date | Team One | Team Two | Score |
|---|---|---|---|
| 27 February 1993 | Halifax | Wigan | 18-19 |
| 27 February 1993 | Hull Kingston Rovers | Widnes | 4-4 |
| 28 February 1993 | Oldham | Bradford Northern | 4-42 |
| 3 March 1993 | Leeds | Castleford | 12-8 |
| 3 March 1993 | Widnes | Hull Kingston Rovers | 16-11 |

== Semi finals ==
13 March 1993

| Widnes | 39 – 4 | Leeds |
|---|---|---|
| Try: Davies (2), Myers (2), Currier, Devereux, Spruce; Goal: Davies (5); Drop goal: Goulding | Report | Goal: Irving (2) |

Central Park, Wigan
Attendance: 13,823

27 March 1993

| Wigan | 15 – 6 | Bradford Northern |
|---|---|---|
| Try: Hampson, Farrar; Goal: Botica (3); Drop goal: Edwards | Report | Try: Simpson; Goal: Hobbs |

Elland Road, Leeds
Attendance: 20,085

== Final ==
1 May 1993

| Wigan | 20 – 14 | Widnes |
|---|---|---|
| Try: Skerrett, Bell, Panapa; Goal: Botica (4) | Report | Try: Eyres, Sorensen; Goal: Davies (3) |

Wembley, London
Attendance: 78,348
Player of the Match: Dean Bell

| FB | 1 | Steve Hampson |
| RW | 2 | Jason Robinson |
| RC | 3 | Joe Lydon |
| LC | 4 | Andrew Farrar |
| LW | 5 | Martin Offiah |
| SO | 6 | Frano Botica |
| SH | 7 | Shaun Edwards |
| PR | 8 | Kelvin Skerrett |
| HK | 9 | Martin Dermott |
| PR | 10 | Andy Platt |
| SR | 11 | Denis Betts |
| SR | 12 | Phil Clarke |
| LF | 13 | Dean Bell (c) |
Substitutions:
| IC | 14 | Sam Panapa |
| IC | 15 | Andy Farrell |
Coach:
John Monie

| FB | 1 | Stuart Spruce |
| RW | 2 | John Devereux |
| RC | 3 | Andy Currier |
| LC | 4 | Darren Wright |
| LW | 5 | David Myers |
| SO | 6 | Jonathan Davies |
| SH | 7 | Bobbie Goulding |
| PR | 8 | Kurt Sorensen |
| HK | 9 | Paul Hulme (c) |
| PR | 10 | Harvey Howard |
| SR | 11 | Esene Faimalo |
| SR | 12 | Richard "Richie" Eyres |
| LF | 13 | David Hulme |
Substitutions:
| IC | 14 | Julian O'Neill |
| IC | 15 | Steve McCurrie |
Coach:
Phil Larder
