= 1998 Super League Grand Final =

Wigan Warriors	Leeds Rhinos
10	4
	1	2	Total
WIG	6	4	10
LEE	4	0	4
- Date: 24 October 1998
- Stadium: Old Trafford
- Location: (England) Manchester
- Harry Sunderland Trophy: (England) Jason Robinson ( Wigan)
- Referee: Russell Smith
- Attendance: 43,533

Broadcast partners
- Broadcasters: Sky Sports
- Commentators: Eddie Hemmings; Mike Stephenson

The 1998 JJB Super League Grand Final was the first staging of the Super League grand final and the conclusive and championship-deciding game of 1998's Super League III, and the first grand final of the Super League era. It was held on Saturday 24 October 1998, at Old Trafford, Manchester, United Kingdom. This was the first time the League Championship had been decided by play-off since the 1972–73 Championship Final. The game was played between Wigan Warriors and Leeds Rhinos.

== Background ==
JJB Sports Super League III was the official name for the year 1998's Super League championship season, the 104th season of top-level professional rugby league football in Britain, and the third championship run by Super League. The League format changed in 1998 and the championship became a play off series to determine the Super League champions, similar to the way the Premiership was played a few seasons earlier. This meant the first Final to determine the British champions since the 1972–73 season. Huddersfield Giants, the league's bottom club was saved from relegation in 1998 due to the expansion of the league to fourteen teams in Super League IV.

=== Route to the Grand Final ===
	Team	Pld	W	D	L	PF	PA	PD	Pts
1	Wigan Warriors	23	21	0	2	762	222	+540	42
2	Leeds Rhinos	23	19	0	4	662	369	+293	38

==== Wigan Warriors ====
By finishing first in the regular season, Wigan qualified directly to the play-off semi-finals. They were drawn against Leeds at home and beat their eventual Grand Final opponents 17–4.

==== Leeds Rhinos ====
The play-off system in use only gave the league leaders a bye to the semi-finals. Leeds had finished second so had to play a qualifying play-off first. Drawn at home to Halifax Blue Sox Leeds won 13–6 to go through to the semi-final. This was an away fixture to Wigan where the Rhinos were beaten 17–4. However this loss did not end their season. The losers of the qualifying semi-final got another chance by playing the winners of the other semi-final in a final eliminator. Therefore Leeds' third play-off game was a home tie against St Helens where they cruised through 44–16.

Leeds
Round	Opposition	Score
Qualifying Play-off	Halifax Blue Sox (H)	13-6
Qualifying Semi-Final	Wigan Warriors (A)	17-4
Final Eliminator	St Helens (H)	44-16
Key: (H) = Home venue; (A) = Away venue.

== Match details ==
24 October 1998

Wigan Warriors	10–4	Leeds Rhinos
Tries: Robinson; Goals: Farrell (3)	Report	Tries: Blackmore

Old Trafford, Manchester
Attendance: 43,533
Referee: Russell Smith (Castleford)

Wigan Warriors		Position	Leeds Rhinos	
1	(England) Kris Radlinski	Fullback	1	(Wales) Iestyn Harris (c)
2	(England) Jason Robinson	Winger	22	(England) Leroy Rivett
3	(Australia) Danny Moore	Centre	3	(New Zealand) Richie Blackmore
4	(England) Gary Connolly	Centre	4	(Australia) Brad Godden
5	(Australia) Mark Bell	Winger	5	(England) Francis Cummins
6	(New Zealand) Henry Paul	Stand Off	13	(England) Daryl Powell
7	(England) Tony Smith	Scrum half	7	(England) Ryan Sheridan
16	(Ireland) Terry O'Connor	Prop	8	(Tonga) Martin Masella
9	(Australia) Robbie McCormack	Hooker	21	(England) Terry Newton
10	(Australia) Tony Mestrov	Prop	25	(England) Darren Fleary
17	(England) Stephen Holgate	2nd Row	11	(England) Adrian Morley
20	(England) Lee Gilmour	2nd Row	17	(England) Anthony Farrell
13	(England) Andy Farrell (c)	Loose forward	12	(Australia) Marc Glanville
25	(England) Paul Johnson	Interchange	24	(England) Marcus St Hilaire
12	(England) Simon Haughton	Interchange	14	(England) Graham Holroyd
14	(England) Mick Cassidy	Interchange	27	(England) Andy Hay
8	(Wales) Neil Cowie	Interchange	20	(Australia) Jamie Mathiou
	(Australia) John Monie	Coach		(Australia) Graham Murray
