= Anthony Colella =

Australian rugby league footballer (born 1975)

Personal information
- Born: 12 July 1975 (age 51)

Playing information
- Position: Second-row
Club
Years	Team	Pld	T	G	FG	P
1995–99	Manly Sea Eagles	43	6	0	0	24
2000–01	Canberra Raiders	28	11	0	0	44
2002	South Sydney	5	0	0	0	0
2003	Huddersfield	6	2	0	0	8
	Total	82	19	0	0	76

Anthony Colella (born 12 July 1975) is an Australian former professional rugby league footballer who played for Manly-Warringah, Canberra and South Sydney in the National Rugby League.

== Biography ==
Colella played 43 first-grade games with Manly from 1995 to 1999. He was a member of the Manly side which lost the 1997 Grand Final to Newcastle. Primarily a back rower, he featured in the grand final as a hooker, due to the suspension of teammate Jim Serdaris.

In 2000 and 2001 he played for the Canberra Raiders, making 28 first-grade appearances.

Following a season at South Sydney in 2002, Colella moved to England to play for Huddersfield in Super League VIII, but was forced to retire from football early in the season with a knee injury.
