= Paul Sterling =

England & Wales international rugby league footballer

Personal information
- Born: 2 August 1964 (age 61) Wolverhampton, England

Playing information

Rugby union
Club
Years	Team	Pld	T	G	FG	P
19??–93	Bradford & Bingley RFC

Rugby league
- Position: Wing
Club
Years	Team	Pld	T	G	FG	P
1993–95	Hull FC	57	27	0	0	108
1996	Hunslet Hawks	12	13	0	0	52
1997–2000	Leeds Rhinos	101	55	0	0	220
	Total	170	95	0	0	380
Representative
Years	Team	Pld	T	G	FG	P
1998	Emerging England	1	0	0	0	0
1999	England	1	1	0	0	4
2000	Wales	4	1	0	0	4

Paul Sterling (born 2 August 1964) is an English former professional rugby league footballer who played in the 1990s and 2000s. He played at representative level for England and Wales, and at club level for Hull FC, Leeds Rhinos and the Hunslet Hawks as a wing.

== Background ==
Sterling was born in Wolverhampton, Staffordshire, England.

== Career ==
Sterling started his rugby league career in 1993, joining Hull F.C. from rugby union club Bradford & Bingley. After spending the 1996 season on loan at Hunslet Hawks, he joined Leeds Rhinos. Sterling was the top try scorer for Leeds Rhinos during 1997's Super League II.

Sterling won a cap for England while at Leeds in 1999 against France. He was also selected for Wales in the 2000 Rugby League World Cup earning caps against Cook Islands, Lebanon, New Zealand, and Papua New Guinea, at 36 years of age, he was the oldest player in the tournament.

In September 2000, Sterling took Leeds to an employment tribunal, claiming that he had been discriminated against by head coach Dean Lance earlier in the year. In December 2000, Leeds were ordered to pay Sterling £16,000 as compensation and to offer him a new one-year contract. Leeds intended to appeal against this ruling, but in April 2001, Sterling announced his retirement, stating that he had lost the desire to play the sport due to the incident.
