= Andy Farrell =

English rugby footballer and coach (born 1975)

Andy Farrell OBE
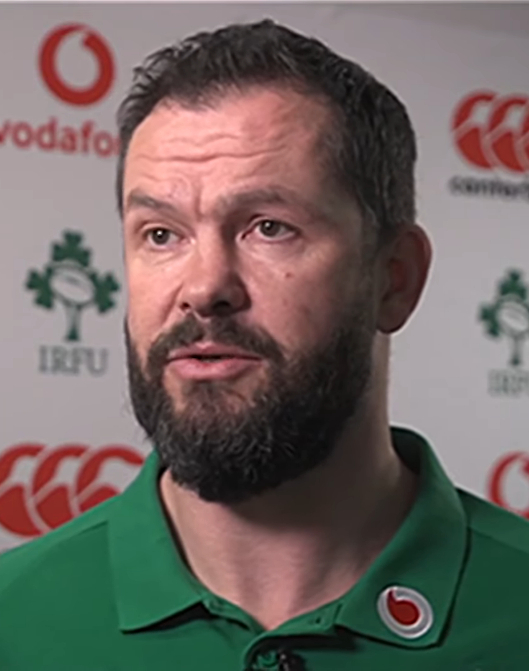
- Farrell in 2020

Personal information
- Full name: Andrew David Farrell
- Born: 30 May 1975 (age 51) Wigan, England
- Height: 1.93 m (6 ft 4 in)
- Relative: See: O'Loughlin Farrell family
- Rugby league career

Playing information
- Position: Loose forward, Second-row
Club
| Years | Team | Pld | T | G | FG | P |
|---|---|---|---|---|---|---|
| 1991–2004 | Wigan | 370 | 111 | 1336 | 19 | 3,135 |
Representative
| Years | Team | Pld | T | G | FG | P |
| 1993–2004 | Great Britain | 34 | 4 | 59 | 0 | 134 |
| 1995–2001 | England | 11 | 3 | 33 | 0 | 78 |
| 2001–2003 | Lancashire | 3 | 0 | 10 | 0 | 20 |

Sport

Rugby union career
- Position(s): Centre, Fly-half, Flanker
Senior career
| Years | Team | Apps | (Points) |
| 2005–2009 | Saracens | 28 | (12) |
- Correct as of 14 May 2023
International career
| Years | Team | Apps | (Points) |
| 2007 | England | 8 | (5) |
- Correct as of 14 May 2023
Coaching career
- Years: Team
- 2010–2012: Saracens
- 2011–2015: England (assistant)
- 2013: British & Irish Lions (defence)
- 2016–2019: Ireland (assistant)
- 2019–: Ireland
- 2025: British & Irish Lions
- Correct as of 24 August 2025

Andrew David Farrell (born 30 May 1975) is an English professional rugby union coach and former rugby league and rugby union footballer. Farrell has been head coach of the Ireland national rugby union team since 2019.

Farrell earned 34 caps for Great Britain and 11 for England in rugby league, including the 1995 and 2000 World Cups, and 8 for England in rugby union, including the 2007 World Cup.

He was a goal-kicking loose forward in rugby league, who played for Wigan between 1991 and 2004, winning six Championships and four Challenge Cups, as well as the Man of Steel award twice. He frequently captained Wigan, England and Great Britain. In rugby union, he played for Saracens from 2005 to 2009, mostly as a centre.

After retiring as a player, Farrell continued in rugby union as a coach, working as an assistant coach with Saracens, Munster, England, Ireland and the British and Irish Lions. He became head coach of Ireland in 2019. He coached them to a 2–1 series victory in New Zealand in 2022 and two consecutive Six Nations Championships wins in 2023 and 2024, including a Grand Slam in 2023.

In January 2024, Farrell was appointed coach of the British & Irish Lions for their tour of Australia in 2025. The Lions won the test series 2–1.

== Early life ==
Farrell was born in Wigan, Lancashire. His father played rugby league. Farrell first played rugby league at age 10 at a summer camp run by Graeme West, who was Wigan captain at the time.

== Playing career ==
=== Rugby league ===
==== 1990s ====
After developing with local club Orrell St James, he made his first-team début for his hometown club Wigan at the age of 16 in 32–8 victory over Keighley in the 1991–92 Regal Trophy match at Central Park, Wigan on Sunday 24 November 1991. Also that year his son Owen Farrell was born, who also went on to become a professional rugby union player.

Farrell became the youngest player to win a Challenge Cup final in 1993 when at 17 years and 11 months he came on as a substitute against Widnes. He then became a full international by the age of 18, making his début for Great Britain against New Zealand (the Kiwis) during their 1993 tour.

After the 1993–94 Rugby Football League season, during which he scored a try in Wigan's Challenge Cup Final victory, Farrell travelled with his club to Brisbane and played as a second-row in their 1994 World Club Challenge victory over Australian premiers, the Brisbane Broncos. He rates this as one of his greatest achievements in rugby league. Farrell was selected to play for Great Britain against Australia in all three Ashes tests of the 1994 Kangaroo tour. The following year he played from the bench for Wigan in the 1995 Challenge Cup Final victory over Leeds Rhinos. At the end of the season he played as a loose forward for England in the 1995 World Cup Final, but Australia won the match and retained the cup.

In July 1996, Farrell was appointed Wigan Warriors' captain and later that year, aged 21 years and four months, became the youngest-ever captain of the Great Britain team, leading the 1996 Lions tour of New Zealand, Papua New Guinea and Fiji. In October that year he won the prestigious Man of Steel Award. He was also named at loose forward in 1996's Super League Dream Team. On 28 September 1997 in the 1997 Super League Premiership Final, Farrell played at loose forward in Wigan's 33–20 win over St. Helens at Old Trafford before a crowd of 33,389. He was awarded the Harry Sunderland Trophy as man of the match. In the 1997 post-season, Farrell was selected to captain Great Britain at stand-off in all three matches of the Super League Test series against Australia. He captained the Wigan Warriors as a second-row in their 1998 Super League Grand Final victory over Leeds Rhinos.

==== 2000s ====
Farrell played for the Wigan Warriors at loose forward, scoring a try and kicking two goals, in their 2000 Super League Grand Final defeat by St. Helens. In the post-season he was selected to captain England in the 2000 Rugby League World Cup. In 2001 Farrell set the Wigan club record for most points in a season with 429 and most points in a Super League championship season with 388. He is only the second Wigan Warriors player to score more than 3,000 points in all competitions. Farrell played for Wigan at loose forward in their 2001 Super League Grand Final defeat by the Bradford Bulls. He celebrated his testimonial match in 2002 and also captained Wigan to victory in the 2002 Challenge Cup.

Farrell played for Wigan at loose forward and kicked two goals in the 2003 Super League Grand Final defeat by the Bradford Bulls. He was inducted into the Order of the British Empire for services to the game in the New Year's list of 2004. He won the Players' Player Award and twice won the Man of Steel Award. Now Britain's oldest international, Farrell was selected in the Great Britain team to compete in the end-of-season 2004 Rugby League Tri-Nations tournament. In the final against Australia he played at second-row, missing his only goal-kick in the Lions' 4–44 loss. Farrell was awarded the Golden Boot as the best player in the world in 2004. He retired while second on the list of the England rugby league side's all-time top goal scorers (behind George Fairbairn), with 78 points.

=== Rugby union ===
On 24 March 2005, Farrell announced his retirement from rugby league in order to play at Saracens and the Rugby Football Union. A series of injuries and accidents (including a car crash) meant that his début in the 15-man code was delayed until 2006. He finally made a try-scoring début for Saracens reserves on 11 September 2006. Farrell then made his first-team début against Newcastle Falcons on 17 September 2006 as a replacement. On both occasions, he played as blind-side flanker. A row then broke out about his best position: the England management suggested he should be playing in the centre, while Saracens continued to play him as a flanker. However Farrell went on to play primarily at centre for the Saracens first team, and again when selected to play for a World XV against South Africa. He was selected as a part of the England Elite squad for the 2007 Six Nations by new coach Brian Ashton. He was seen by some to be the main contender for the starting inside centre position, after England's problems in that position during the 2006 autumn internationals.

Farrell made his England début at Twickenham after he was named at inside centre in the first Six Nations game against Scotland. The 2007 World Cup saw Farrell starting at inside centre against South Africa, in England's chastening group stage defeat. He was then brought on as a replacement against Tonga, and scored his first England try. However, after being picked for the quarter-final decider against Australia he had to withdraw with a calf injury. Unfortunately, he never produced the performances for the England union side for which many had hoped, and ultimately he won only eight caps. In January 2008 Farrell was joined at Saracens by his 16-year-old son Owen Farrell, who signed a three-year academy deal with the club. In August 2008 Farrell was named co-captain for the 2008–09 season along with Steve Borthwick. There were rumours of Farrell returning to rugby league and rejoining Wigan Warriors after it emerged that Saracens head coach Eddie Jones had become unhappy with the direction his club was taking. It was rumoured that Jones and Farrell could be moving up north, with the Warriors becoming increasingly impatient with out-of-favour Brian Noble, especially after their poor start to the season; however this proved to be unfounded, with the Warriors instead hiring Melbourne Storm assistant coach Michael Maguire. In April 2009 Farrell announced his retirement and said he was taking up a coaching role with Saracens at the end of the season.

== Coaching career ==
=== Saracens and England ===
Farrell was promoted to Saracens first-team coach at the end of 2010 after impressing as skills coach. The RFU announced on 8 December 2011 that both he and Graham Rowntree were to join the national coaching team, led by Stuart Lancaster, for the 2012 Six Nations. After the successful campaign Farrell was given the chance to become a permanent part of the England coaching team; he initially decided to return to Saracens, but soon left the London club and joined England on a three-and-a-half-year contract. Farrell toured with the British and Irish Lions in 2013 as defence coach.

Following the resignation of Stuart Lancaster on 11 November 2015, new head coach Eddie Jones sacked Farrell and the rest of the coaching team on 15 December 2015.

=== Munster ===
On 6 January 2016, it was announced that Farrell would take up the role of Ireland defence coach after the completion of the 2016 Six Nations Championship. As his previous contract with England prevented him from working with an international team until April 2016, Farrell joined Irish province Munster in January 2016 in a temporary advisor role that was to last for four months.

=== Ireland ===
On 26 November 2018, it was announced that Ireland head coach Joe Schmidt would step down after the 2019 Rugby World Cup with Farrell taking over as head coach. His first game in charge was against Scotland at the Aviva Stadium on 1 February 2020 in the 2020 Six Nations Championship Ireland won this game 19-12 and went on to finish in third place in the delayed Six Nations Championship. Ireland finished in third place again in the 2021 Six Nations Championship, losing games against Wales and France. On 13 November 2021, in the Autumn internationals, Ireland defeated New Zealand 29–20.

Ireland won 29–7 against Wales in their opening fixture of the 2022 Six Nations Championship on 5 February, before losing 30–24 defeat away to France on 12 February. They won the next game 57–6 against Italy on 27 February, before a 32–15 away win against England on 12 March. A 26–5 win at home against Scotland on 19 March was enough to secure the Triple Crown for Ireland and a second-place finish in the championship. On 9 July 2022, Ireland had a historic win in New Zealand, beating the All Blacks 23–12 in Dunedin in the second match of the 2022 New Zealand tour, their first ever victory against the All Blacks in New Zealand. A week later, they won again in Wellington, beating the All Blacks 32–22 to win the series. Following that victory Ireland became the world number one team for the second time.

In the 2023 Six Nations Championship, Ireland defeated Wales in their opening game on 4 February, and went on to defeat France, Italy, and Scotland before beating England 29-16 on 18 March to win the Championship, triple crown, and the grand slam.

In August 2023, Farrell announced his squad for the 2023 Rugby World Cup in France. At the World Cup, Ireland won pool B making it to the quarterfinals, but lost 24-28 to New Zealand. Due in part to Farrell managing Ireland to a Grand Slam and a strong performance in the World Cup, Farrell was awarded World Rugby Coach of the Year for 2023. On 14 December 2023, Farrell signed a new four-year contract to remain as Ireland head coach until the end of the 2027 Rugby World Cup.

Ireland under Farrell won the 2024 Six Nations Championship, beating all nations except England. Following the conclusion of the 2024 Autumn Nations Series, a 22-19 win for Ireland over Australia, he began his sabbatical from the Ireland team to begin his work with the British & Irish Lions. Simon Easterby assumed coach duties for Ireland in his absence.

In June 2026, Farrell signed a contract extension with Ireland until 2031.

=== British & Irish Lions ===
Farrell was an assistant coach to Warren Gatland on the 2013 Lions tour to Australia, when the Lions won the series 2-1. He was also an assistant coach on the Lions' 2017 tour to New Zealand, when the series was drawn 1-1. In January 2024, Farrell was announced as head coach for the 2025 tour to Australia. After losing to Argentina in a pre-tour match in Dublin, the Lions won all their matches in Australia, except the third test. They won the test series 2–1.

== Personal life ==
Farrell married Colleen O’Loughlin, the sister of his future Wigan teammate Sean O’Loughlin, in 1995 and has four children, including England rugby union player Owen Farrell. Both Farrell and his wife are of Irish descent.

== Managerial statistics ==
As of match played 22 February 2026

| Team | Nation | From | To | Record | | | | | | |
| Team | Nation | From | To | G | W | L | F | A | PD | Win % |
|---|---|---|---|---|---|---|---|---|---|---|
| Ireland | (Ireland) | 25 October 2019 | Present | 68 | 53 | 15 | 2,120 | 1,141 | +979 | 77.94 |
| British & Irish Lions | | 10 June 2025 | 4 August 2025 | 10 | 8 | 2 | 327 | 167 | +160 | 80 |
| Total | | | | 78 | 61 | 17 | 2,447 | 1,308 | +1139 | 78.21 |

== Honours ==
=== Rugby league ===
==== As player ====
Great Britain / England

- Rugby League World Cup (RLWC)
  - Runners-up: 1995
- Tri-Nations
  - Runners-up: 2004

Wigan

- Rugby Football League Championship First Division / Super League
  - Champion: 1990–91, 1991–92, 1992–93, 1993–94, 1994–95, 1995–96, 1998
- League Leaders' Shield
  - Champion: 1998, 2000
- Rugby League Premiership
  - Champion: 1991–92, 1993–94, 1994–95, 1996, 1997
- Challenge Cup
  - Champion: 1990–91, 1991–92, 1992–93, 1993–94, 1994–95, 2002
- Lancashire Cup
  - Champion: 1992–93
- League Cup
  - Champion: 1992–93, 1994–95, 1995–96
- Charity Shield
  - Champion: 1991–92, 1995–96
- World Club Challenge
  - Champion: 1994

Individual

- Rugby League World Golden Boot: 2004
- RLWBA Player of the Year: 1997
- Man of Steel: 1996, 2004
- Super League Dream Team: 1996, 1997, 1998, 2000, 2001, 2003, 2004
- Rugby Football League Hall of Fame: Inducted 2022
- Wigan Warriors Hall of Fame: Inducted Unknown

=== Rugby union ===
==== As player ====
England

- Calcutta Cup
  - 2007

==== As coach ====
British & Irish Lions

- British & Irish Lions tour to Australia: 2025

Ireland

- Six Nations Championship
  - Champion: 2023, 2024
- Grand Slam
  - Champion: 2023
- Triple Crown
  - Champion: 2022, 2023, 2025, 2026
- Millennium Trophy (England–Ireland)
  - Champion: 2021, 2022, 2023, 2025, 2026
- Centenary Quaich (Ireland–Scotland)
  - Champion: 2020, 2021, 2022, 2023, 2024, 2025, 2026
- Admiral Brown Cup (Argentina–Ireland)
  - Champion: 2021, 2022, 2023, 2024
- Lansdowne Cup (Australia–Ireland)
  - Champion: 2022

Individual

- World Rugby Coach of the Year: 2023

Sporting positions
| Preceded by (New Zealand) Joe Schmidt | Ireland National Rugby Union Coach; 2019–Present | Succeeded by Incumbent |
