= Martin Hall (rugby league) =

Pro RL coach & former Wales international rugby league footballer

Personal information
- Born: 5 December 1968 (age 57) Oldham, Lancashire, England

Playing information
- Position: Hooker
Club
Years	Team	Pld	T	G	FG	P
1986–89	Oldham	10	2	0	0	8
1989–93	Rochdale Hornets	107	24	0	0	96
1993–97	Wigan	141	29	18	1	153
1998	Castleford Tigers	4	0	0	0	0
1998	Halifax	12	0	0	0	0
1999	Hull FC	7	0	0	0	0
	Total	281	55	18	1	257
Representative
Years	Team	Pld	T	G	FG	P
1995–98	Wales	9	0	0	0	0

Coaching information
Club
Years	Team	Gms	W	D	L	W%
2000–03	Rochdale Hornets	7	5	0	2	71
2004	Hull Kingston Rovers
2006–07	Halifax RLFC
	Total	7	5	0	2	71
Representative
Years	Team	Gms	W	D	L	W%
2005–07	Wales	7	4	0	3	57

Martin Hall (born 5 December 1968) is a former rugby league footballer and coach. During his playing career, Hall played hooker at Oldham, Rochdale Hornets, Wigan, Castleford, Halifax and Hull FC.

As a coach, he had stints with Rochdale Hornets and Hull Kingston Rovers. He was the head coach of Halifax between 2006 and 2010. He was also the head coach of the Wales national rugby league team for three years between 2005 and 2007.

== Playing career ==
=== Rochdale Hornets ===
Hall started his career with Oldham before joining Rochdale Hornets in 1989, with the transfer fee of £10,000 being set by a tribunal.

Martin Hall played in Rochdale Hornets 14–24 defeat by St. Helens in the 1991 Lancashire Cup Final during the 1991–92 season at Wilderspool Stadium, Warrington, on Sunday 20 October 1991.

=== Wigan ===
Hall was signed by Wigan in January 1993 for a fee of £35,000. After the 1993–94 season, Hall travelled with defending champions Wigan to Brisbane, playing from the interchange bench in their 1994 World Club Challenge victory over Australian premiers, the Brisbane Broncos.

Hall played hooker in Wigan's 40–10 victory over Warrington in the 1994–95 Regal Trophy Final during the 1994–95 season at Alfred McAlpine Stadium, Huddersfield on Saturday 28 January 1995. He played hooker, and scored a try in Wigan's 30–10 victory over Leeds in the 1995 Challenge Cup Final at Wembley Stadium, London on Saturday 29 April 1995.

Hall played hooker in the 25–17 victory over St. Helens in the 1995–96 Regal Trophy Final during the 1995–96 season at Alfred McAlpine Stadium, Huddersfield on Saturday 13 January 1996.

== Coaching career ==
Hall was appointed as coach at Rochdale Hornets in November 2000. He was named National League One Coach of the Year in 2003, but resigned at the end of the season.

Hall took over the head coaching job at Halifax in June 2006, replacing Anthony Farrell.
