= Mick Shaw =

English rugby league footballer

Personal information
- Full name: Michael Shaw
- Born: 16 July 1975 Halifax, West Yorkshire, England
- Died: 19 March 2012 (aged 36)

Playing information
- Position: Hooker
Club
Years	Team	Pld	T	G	FG	P
1994–97	Leeds	38	13	0	0	52
1997(loan)	→ Bramley	2	1	0	0	4
1998–99	Rochdale Hornets	23	10	0	0	40
1999	Halifax	5	1	0	0	4
	Total	68	25	0	0	100

Michael Shaw (16 July 1975 – 19 March 2012) was an English rugby league footballer who played for Leeds, Bramley, Rochdale Hornets and Halifax.

== Playing career ==
Shaw started his professional career at Leeds, joining the club from Elland in 1993. In 1997, after playing 38 games for Leeds, he was loaned out to Bramley. In 1998, he joined Rochdale Hornets.

In July 1999, he was signed by Halifax, and made five Super League appearances for the club, scoring one try. He later went on to play for amateur club Siddal.

== Death ==
In March 2012, Shaw died aged 36.
