= Chris Feather =

English rugby league footballer

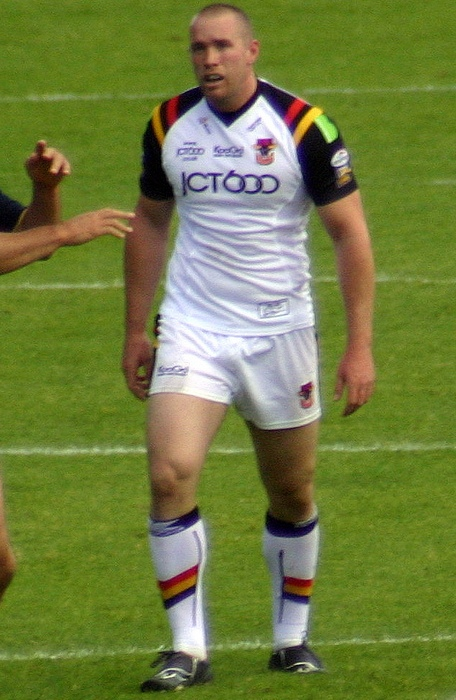

Personal information
- Full name: Christopher Feather
- Born: 7 December 1981 (age 44) Keighley, West Yorkshire, England

Playing information
- Height: 6 ft 4 in (1.93 m)
- Weight: 18 st 0 lb (114 kg)
- Position: Prop
Club
| Years | Team | Pld | T | G | FG | P |
|---|---|---|---|---|---|---|
| 2001–02 | Wakefield Trinity Wildcats | 36 | 6 | 0 | 0 | 24 |
| 2003–06 | Leeds Rhinos | 56 | 8 | 0 | 0 | 32 |
| 2004(loan) | → Wakefield Trinity Wildcats | 8 | 2 | 0 | 0 | 8 |
| 2005(loan) | → Wakefield Trinity Wildcats | 21 | 1 | 0 | 0 | 4 |
| 2007–08 | Bradford Bulls | 30 | 1 | 0 | 0 | 4 |
| 2009 | Castleford Tigers | 27 | 0 | 0 | 0 | 0 |
| | Total | 178 | 18 | 0 | 0 | 72 |

Chris Feather (born 7 December 1981) is an English former professional rugby league footballer. He plays for Wyong Roos in the Tooheys Cup in Newcastle. He previously played for Villeneuve Leopards in the Elite One Championship, and Wakefield Trinity Wildcats, Leeds Rhinos, Castleford Tigers and Bradford Bulls in the Super League. His position is prop.

== Background ==
Feather was born in Keighley, West Yorkshire, England.

== Rugby career ==
Chris came through the ranks at Wakefield Trinity Wildcats, and he made his début in 2001. He made just 5 substitute appearances in 2001, but in 2002 made 13 starts and 18 at substitute, including an appearance in the Challenge Cup quarter final at Headingley when he scored against the Leeds Rhinos.

== 2004–2009 ==
In 2004 he re-joined Wakefield Trinity Wildcats on loan for the last two months of the season. He made 8 appearances for Wakefield Trinity Wildcats and was one of their top performers in the play-off success, scoring a try against Hull. He returned to Wakefield Trinity Wildcats again in 2005 on loan, making 21 appearances and scoring 1-try in the Wakefield Trinity Wildcats victory over Salford City Reds before returning to Leeds Rhinos at the end of the Wakefield Trinity Wildcats' season.

Feather joined Leeds Rhinos for the 2003's Super League VIII on a four-year contract. In his first season at Headingley, he was a regular member of the first team, however he did not start a game all season, instead making an impact off the bench on 28 occasions. His first try for Rhinos came against Halifax when Leeds won 20-14 at The Shay. Feather was part of the squad that reached the Challenge Cup at Cardiff however was not selected to play. Feather went back on loan to Wakefield Trinity Wildcats at the end of 2004 and the whole of 2005. He returned to Leeds for 2006 and played 12 games.

== Bradford Bulls ==
Feather signed for Bradford Bulls in August 2006. His contract was for the 2007, 2008, 2009 seasons. Feather broke his ankle in May 2007 and was ruled out for a couple of months. He also suffered two shoulder dislocations, injuries to his back and a neck injury that caused temporarily paralysis in April 2008. At the end of 2008, he was released from his contract by mutual consent, and joined Castleford Tigers on a one-year deal, joining fellow ex-Bradford Bulls player James Evans.

== Castleford Tigers ==
He signed for Castleford Tigers in October 2008. Feather was released by Castleford at the end of the 2009 season.

== Statistics ==
=== Club career ===
| Year | Club | Apps | Pts | T | G | FG |
|---|---|---|---|---|---|---|
| 2001 | Wakefield Trinity Wildcats | 5 | - | - | - | - |
| 2002 | Wakefield Trinity Wildcats | 28 | 24 | 6 | - | - |
| 2003 | Leeds | 26 | 8 | 2 | - | - |
| 2004 | Leeds | 13 | 12 | 3 | - | - |
| 2004 | Wakefield Trinity Wildcats | 8 | 8 | 2 | - | - |
| 2005 | Wakefield Trinity Wildcats | 20 | 4 | 1 | - | - |
| 2006 | Leeds | 12 | 4 | 1 | - | - |
| 2007 | Bradford Bulls | 16 | - | - | - | - |
| 2008 | Bradford Bulls | 7 | 4 | 1 | - | - |
| 2009 | Castleford Tigers | - | - | - | - | - |
| 09/10 | Villeneuve Leopards | - | - | - | - | - |

== Off the Field ==
Chris Feather is studying a sports science degree at Leeds Metropolitan University.

== Australia ==
Chris Feather signed on to play with the Wyong Roos in Newcastle during June 2010.
