= Jamie Thackray =

GB international rugby league footballer

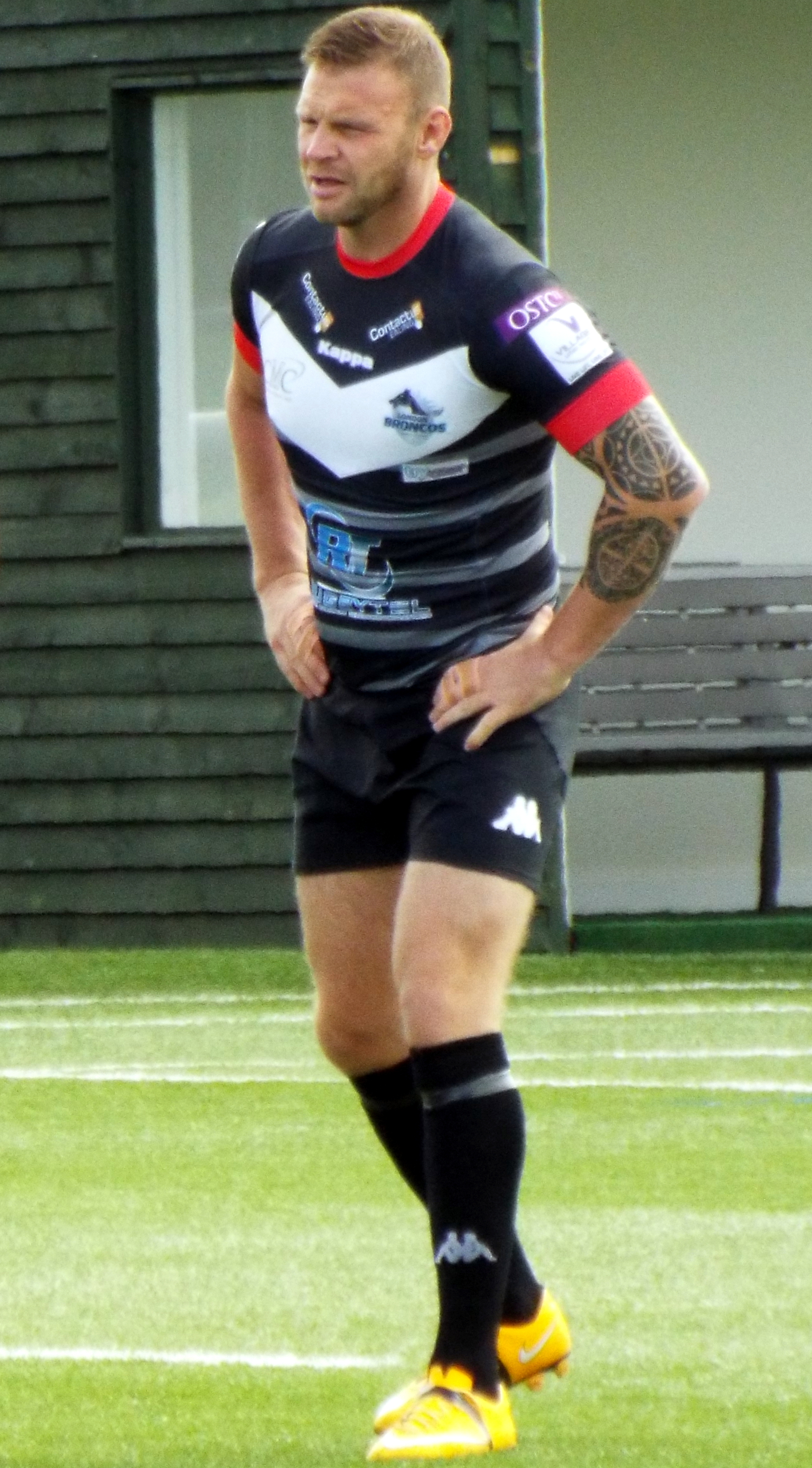

Personal information
- Full name: Jamie Thackray
- Born: 30 September 1979 (age 46) Rothwell, Leeds, West Yorkshire, England

Playing information
- Height: 6 ft 2 in (1.88 m)
- Weight: 16 st 3 lb (103 kg)

Rugby league
- Position: Prop, Second-row
Club
Years	Team	Pld	T	G	FG	P
1997–00	Hunslet Hawks	69	6	0	0	24
1999(loan)	→ Doncaster	4	0	0	0	0
2000–02	Halifax	51	3	0	0	12
2002(loan)	→ Doncaster	2	0	0	0	0
2003–04	Castleford Tigers	21	5	0	0	20
2005–06	Hull FC	43	3	0	0	12
2006–08	Leeds Rhinos	34	7	0	0	28
2008(loan)	→ Doncaster	2	1	0	0	4
2008–09	Hull FC	42	4	0	0	16
2010	Crusaders RL	19	3	0	0	12
2010(loan)	→ South Wales Scorpions	1	0	0	0	0
2011	Barrow Raiders	21	2	0	0	8
2011–12	Limoux Grizzlies	9	1	0	0	4
2012–13	Workington Town	52	16	0	0	64
2015–16	London Broncos	35	6	0	0	24
2016(loan)	→ London Skolars	2	0	0	0	0
2017	Doncaster	15	1	0	0	4
2019	Keighley Cougars	13	1	0	0	4
2020	Whitehaven	4	0	0	0	0
	Total	439	59	0	0	236
Representative
Years	Team	Pld	T	G	FG	P
2005	Great Britain	3	0	0	0	0

Rugby union
Club
Years	Team	Pld	T	G	FG	P
2014–15	Hullensians

Jamie Thackray (born 30 September 1979) is a former Great Britain international rugby league footballer who played as a prop or second-row forward. He played for over a dozen professional clubs throughout his career, most notably appearing for Halifax, Castleford Tigers, Hull FC, Leeds Rhinos, Workington Town and Crusaders

== Biography ==
=== Early career ===
Born in Leeds, Thackray played junior rugby league for Oulton Raiders before turning professional with Hunslet, where he made his debut in 1997. He appeared as a substitute in the club's 12–11 win over Dewsbury in the 1999 Northern Ford Premiership Grand Final.

=== Super League career ===
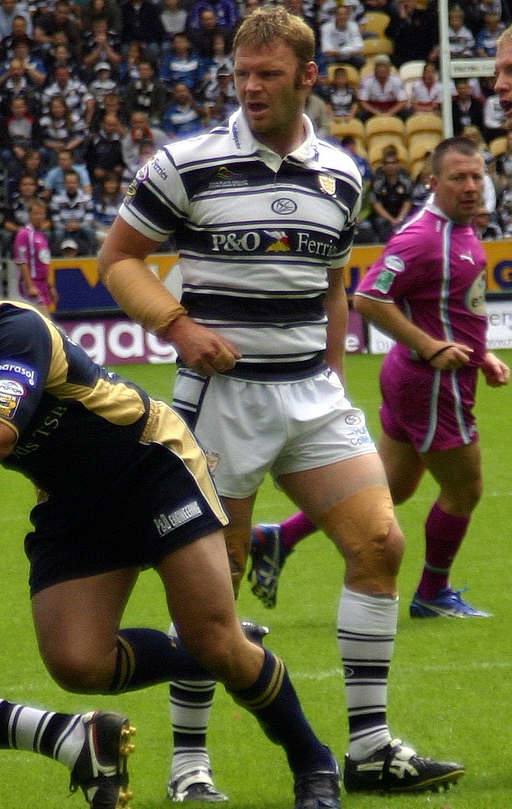
Thackray playing for Hull FC

After a stint with Halifax, Thackray moved to Castleford. During these seasons, Thackray played some games as a second-row before settling into his permanent role as a prop forward. His appearances at Castleford were limited due to suffering a broken arm twice during his two seasons at the club.

After Castleford, Thackray moved to Hull FC. Thackray played for Hull in the 2005 Challenge Cup Final from the interchange bench in their victory against the Leeds Rhinos. He was named in the Super League Dream Team at the end of the season, and was selected by Great Britain for the 2005 Tri-Nations, winning three caps during the tournament.

He then moved to Leeds in 2006. In February 2007, he scored a memorable try in a 22–30 defeat against Catalans Dragons which won the club's try of the season award.

After a spell on loan to Doncaster in the Northern Rail Cup, he re-joined Hull in March 2008. He helped the club reach the 2008 Challenge Cup final, but Hull received a fine of £100,000 as Thackray had made ineligible appearances in earlier rounds of the competition due to not being registered.

At the end of the 2009 season, Thackray was released by Hull. In early 2010, Thackray signed for Crusaders RL. Within a fortnight, he made his début for Crusaders against his former team, Leeds and went on to appear 20 times for the Welsh outfit during their Super League campaign.

=== Later career ===
On 12 November 2010, it was announced that he had joined Super League hopefuls Barrow for the 2011 Championship campaign.

In 2012 he joined Workington Town.

In 2014, Thackray played in Australia for Cairns District Rugby League club Atherton Roosters.

After a spell playing rugby union for Hullensians, Thackray joined London Broncos in the Championship. In 2016, his 20th season as a professional rugby league player, he was awarded a testimonial by the Rugby Football League.

Thackray initially ended his playing career with Doncaster in 2017, but came out of retirement to sign for Keighley Cougars in 2019. At the age of 40, he signed a one-year deal with Whitehaven for the 2020 season.

After retiring from rugby league, Thackray began running a caravan construction company.
