= Darren Fleary =

Former GB & England international rugby league footballer

Personal information
- Full name: Darren Peter Fleary
- Born: 2 December 1972 (age 53) Huddersfield, West Riding of Yorkshire, England

Playing information
- Position: Prop, Second-row
Club
Years	Team	Pld	T	G	FG	P
1991–94	Dewsbury
1994–97	Keighley Cougars	97	10	0	0	40
1997–02	Leeds Rhinos	127	5	0	0	20
2003–04	Huddersfield Giants	55	4	0	0	16
2005	Leigh Centurions	27	2	0	0	8
	Total	306	21	0	0	84
Representative
Years	Team	Pld	T	G	FG	P
1998	Great Britain	2	0	0	0	0
2000	England	3	0	0	0	0
2001	Yorkshire	1	0	0	0	0

Darren Fleary (born 2 December 1972) is an English former professional rugby league footballer who played in the 1990s and 2000s, and coach. He played at representative level for Great Britain and England, and at club level for Dewsbury, Keighley Cougars, Leeds Rhinos, Huddersfield Giants and the Leigh Centurions, as a prop or second-row.

== Background ==
Darren Fleary's birth was registered in Huddersfield, West Riding of Yorkshire, England.

After finishing his playing career, Fleary worked as a prison officer at Armley Jail in Leeds, and also coached junior teams at Newsome Panthers.

== Playing career ==
=== Early career ===
Fleary started his professional career with Dewsbury, signing from amateur club Moldgreen in September 1991. He moved to Keighley Cougars in 1994.

=== Leeds Rhinos ===
In July 1997, Fleary was one of nine Keighley players who signed for Leeds Rhinos for a combined fee of £25,000.

Fleary played prop in Leeds Rhinos' 4–10 defeat by Wigan Warriors in the 1998 Super League Grand Final during Super League III at Old Trafford, Manchester on Saturday 24 October 1998.

Fleary played in Leeds Rhinos' 52–16 victory over London Broncos in the 1999 Challenge Cup Final during Super League IV at Wembley Stadium, London on Saturday 1 May 1999, and played left-prop in the 18–24 defeat by Bradford Bulls in the 2000 Challenge Cup Final during Super League V at Murrayfield Stadium, Edinburgh on Saturday 29 April 2000.

=== Later career ===
Fleary joined his hometown club Huddersfield Giants in 2003. He was chosen as the club's captain for the 2004 season, following the departure of Steve McNamara. He spent his final season with Leigh Centurions in 2005, where he was also appointed captain.

=== International honours ===
Fleary played twice Great Britain while at Leeds Rhinos in 1998 against New Zealand during the 1998 Kiwis tour. He also won caps for England while at Leeds Rhinos in the 2000 Rugby League World Cup against Australia (sub), Russia, and New Zealand (sub).
