= Carl Hall (rugby) =

New Zealand rugby footballer

Personal information
- Born: 10 August 1969 (age 56) Mount Albert, New Zealand

Playing information

Rugby league
- Position: Wing, Centre
Club
Years	Team	Pld	T	G	FG	P
1988–92	Doncaster	81	40	1	0	162
1992	Hull Kingston Rovers	3	2	0	0	8
1993–94	Doncaster	19	18	0	0	72
1993–95	Bradford Northern	37	20	1	0	82
1995	Bradford Northern	12	6	0	0	24
1995–96	Leeds	18	8	0	0	32
1998–99	Featherstone Rovers	40	17	0	0	68
2000–01	Doncaster Dragons	56	40	0	0	160
2001–02	York Wasps	10	5	0	0	20
	Total	276	156	2	0	628

Rugby union
- Position: Centre
Club
Years	Team	Pld	T	G	FG	P
1997	Moseley
1999	Stade Français
	Total	0	0	0	0	0

Carl Hall (born 10 August 1969) is a New Zealand former professional rugby league and rugby union footballer who played in the 1980s, 1990s and 2000s. He played representative level rugby league (RL) for Junior Kiwis (New Zealand Schoolboys), and at club level for Doncaster (three spells), Hull Kingston Rovers, Bradford Northern, Leeds, Featherstone Rovers and York Wasps, and club level rugby union (RU) for Moseley and Stade Français, as a centre. He is currently Chief executive officer (CEO) of Doncaster (RL), having sold the club in 2013 to the Doncaster Rovers (association football) ownership structure as part of the "Club Doncaster" vision.

== Playing career ==
A New Zealand youth international, Hall first came to light on the Junior Kiwis tour of the United Kingdom in 1987, as a centre or winger, eventually making over 250-appearances for several clubs.

He initially joined Doncaster in 1988, representing them for 3-seasons, before spending time at Hull Kingston Rovers. He returned to Doncaster in 1993, where his 18-tries in 19-appearances attracted the attentions of Bradford Northern, who moved to secure him for the rest of the season, where he scored 9 tries in 13-appearances.

Representing Bradford Northern a further 24-times in the next 2-seasons, he then moved across West Yorkshire to join Leeds, where he made 18-appearances, scoring 8-tries. Following his departure from Leeds, he spent a season playing rugby union at Moseley in Birmingham, before coming back to rugby league to represent Featherstone Rovers.

Spending another post season in rugby union, this time with Stade Français, he returned to Doncaster, scoring tries in 56-games. He spent the 2001–02 season at the York Wasps, before retiring from playing rugby.

== Post-playing career ==
In 2009, following the announcement that Shane Miller and Craig Harrison would be departing as owners, Hall put together a working group of local Doncaster businessmen, who would run the club together, and ensure that it was kept secure financially. In 2013, following the club gaining promotion back to the Championship, the second-tier of the Rugby Football League, Hall sold the club to "Club Doncaster", part of the ownership group of Doncaster Rovers F.C. Following this sale, he was appointed CEO of the club, and has since remained in that position.

In December 2018, it was announced that Hall will be appointed as the Vice President of the Rugby Football League over the summer of 2019.
