= Nathan Picchi =

New Zealand rugby league footballer

Personal information
- Born: 14 November 1977 (age 47); New Zealand

Playing information
- Position: Loose forward
Club
Years	Team	Pld	T	G	FG	P
1994–95	Hawkes Bay Unicorns	33	7	0	0	28
1996	Leeds Rhinos	1	0	0	0	0
1997	Rochdale Hornets	10	9	0	0	36
	Total	44	16	0	0	64
Representative
Years	Team	Pld	T	G	FG	P
1995–98	New Zealand Māori

Nathan Picchi is a New Zealand rugby league player who played professionally for the Leeds Rhinos.

== Playing career ==
Picchi played for the Hawkes Bay Unicorns in the 1995 Lion Red Cup, and also represented the New Zealand Māori.

In 1996, he signed with the Leeds Rhinos. His career lasted just one match, suffering a bad shoulder dislocation fifty minutes into his début appearance. He was released at the end of the year.

In 1997, Picchi played for the Rochdale Hornets. He later played for Rotherham Giants, and the Gloucestershire Warriors.

In 1998, he played for Manawatu, and again represented New Zealand Māori.
