= Dean Lawford =

English rugby league footballer

Personal information
- Born: 9 May 1977 (age 47); Dewsbury, England

Playing information
- Position: Scrum-half
Club
Years	Team	Pld	T	G	FG	P
1995–96	Sheffield Eagles	28	3	3	2	20
1997–00	Leeds Rhinos	30	3	4	0	20
1998(loan)	→ Bramley	6	4	9	2	36
1999(loan)	→Huddersfield Giants	7	0	6	1	13
2001	Halifax	2	0	0	0	0
2001	Dewsbury Rams	7	0	0	3	3
2002	Batley Bulldogs	30	2	92	8	200
2003–04	Widnes Vikings	22	8	3	4	42
2004	Batley Bulldogs	9	3	0	0	12
2005–06	Halifax	37	4	38	0	92
2007–08	Dewsbury Rams	38	7	4	2	38
	Total	216	34	159	22	476

Dean Lawford (born 9 May 1977) is an English former professional rugby league footballer who played in the 1990s and 2000s. He played at club level for Dewsbury Moor of the National Conference League, Sheffield Eagles, Leeds Rhinos, Bramley, Huddersfield Giants, Halifax, Batley Bulldogs, Widnes Vikings and Dewsbury Rams, as a scrum-half.

== Background ==
Lawford was born in Dewsbury, West Yorkshire, England.

== Career ==
Lawford was transferred from Dewsbury Moor to Sheffield Eagles in 1994, he was transferred from Sheffield Eagles to Leeds Rhinos in December 1996.

In August 2002, he signed a two-year contract with Widnes Vikings. He was released by the club at his own request in March 2004.
