= Alan Tait =

Scottish rugby player (born 1964)

- Born: Alan Victor Tait; 2 July 1964 (age 62) Kelso, Scottish Borders, Scotland
- Height: 5 ft 10 in (1.78 m)
- Weight: 13 st 5 lb (85 kg)

Rugby union career
- Position: Centre
Amateur team(s)
| Years | Team | Apps | (Points) |
| 1987–88 | Kelso | | |
Senior career
| Years | Team | Apps | (Points) |
| 1996–98 | Newcastle Falcons | 19 | (10) |
| 1998–2000 | Edinburgh | | |
Provincial / State sides
| Years | Team | Apps | (Points) |
- South of Scotland
| - | Reds Trial | | |
International career
| Years | Team | Apps | (Points) |
| 1987–99 | Scotland | 27 | (81) |
| 1997 | British and Irish Lions | 2 | (5) |
Coaching career
- Years: Team
- 2009–12: Newcastle Falcons
- 2022-: Southern Knights
- Rugby league career

Playing information
- Position: Full back / Centre
Club
| Years | Team | Pld | T | G | FG | P |
|---|---|---|---|---|---|---|
| 1988–1992 | Widnes | 136 | | | | 225 |
| 1992–1996 | Leeds | 126 | | | | 176 |
| | Total | 262 | 0 | 0 | 0 | 401 |
Representative
| Years | Team | Pld | T | G | FG | P |
| 1989–1993 | Great Britain | 14 | | | | 24 |
| 1995–1996 | Scotland | 4 | | | | 20 |

Alan Victor Tait (born 2 November 1964) is a Scottish former rugby union and rugby league footballer, and now rugby union coach. He is a defence coach at the Super 6 side Southern Knights. He was previously head coach at Newcastle Falcons.

In rugby union, Tait played outside centre for Kelso, Edinburgh and the Newcastle Falcons. He won 27 international caps for Scotland and 2 for the British and Irish Lions.

In 1988 he moved to Widnes in rugby league, and later played for Leeds. He won 14 caps for Great Britain and 4 for Scotland.

== Rugby union ==
Tait grew up in Cumbria, where his father, Alan Sr, was playing rugby league for Workington Town. Tait played rugby union first and made his Test début for Scotland in the inaugural 1987 World Cup held in New Zealand, where he came on after seven minutes as a replacement in a 20–20 draw with France in Christchurch.

Tait played for the Reds trial side in their trial match against the Blues on 3 January 1987.

== Rugby league ==
In 1988 Tait switched codes to rugby league and spent the next eight years playing for Widnes and Leeds. He represented Great Britain and Scotland.

During the 1989–90 season, Tait played for defending champions Widnes at fullback in their 1989 World Club Challenge victory against the visiting Canberra Raiders.

Tait won the Harry Sunderland Trophy in both 1989 and 1990.

Tait played fullback in Widnes' 24–18 victory over Salford in the 1990 Lancashire Cup Final during the 1990–91 season at Central Park, Wigan on Saturday 29 September 1990.

He played fullback in Widnes' 6–12 defeat by Wigan in the 1988–89 John Player Special Trophy Final during the 1988–89 season at Burnden Park, Bolton on Saturday 7 January 1989, and played fullback, and scored a try in the 24–0 victory over Leeds in the 1991–92 Regal Trophy Final during the 1991–92 season at Central Park, Wigan on Saturday 11 January 1992.

In the 1992 World Cup Final at Wembley Stadium Tait was selected to play for Great Britain from the reserve bench in their defeat by Australia. He also made appearances in the Challenge Cup Finals in 1994 and 1995

== Return to rugby union ==
With rugby union turning professional, Tait along with many other converts switched codes back to union in 1996, signing for the Newcastle Falcons. They won the Premiership in 1998, with Tait making 19 appearances that season.

At first he was ignored by the Scotland selectors but eventually made his return for Scotland after a nine-year absence in 1997 and went on to represent the British & Irish Lions in South Africa in the summer of that year. Surprising many Tait was selected to start the first two Tests on the wing, even though his favoured and more recognised position was at centre. This was due to coach Ian McGeechan believing that Tait would add extra defensive capabilities to the backline over the other wingers, in what would be a tight test series. He scored a try in the first match as the Lions won 25–16 in Cape Town. He also played in the second match which saw the Lions clinch the series after a dramatic 18–15 victory in Durban. Injured before the 3rd Test he did not play as the Lions lost the last match 35–16.

For Scotland Tait developed a partnership with John Leslie. The 1999 Five Nations Championship culminated in Scotland narrowly finished ahead of England on points difference thanks to Wales' last minute victory over England at Wembley. Tait scored two tries in Scotland's last match of the tournament as they beat France 36–22. Later that year he represented Scotland for the last time at the 1999 World Cup, finishing with a defeat by New Zealand. He scored a try against South Africa in the pool stages at Murrayfield in a 46–29 loss to the holders. In 2000 Tait retired from professional rugby, playing for Edinburgh Reivers.

In all Tait played 27 times for Scotland, scoring 17 tries.

== Coaching ==
Following his retirement he moved into coaching, initially working with Scotland as a defence coach. Although he was dismissed from the post by Matt Williams he was later restored to that role by Williams successor Frank Hadden. In 2004 he joined the Borders as a defensive coach.

Tait then moved back to the Falcons as an assistant before assuming the top job at the Premiership club as part of a restructuring process in the wake of Steve Bates' departure as director of rugby in 2009. He held the position of head coach of Newcastle from 2009 to 2012 until club owner, Semore Kurdi, announced Tait was 'taking a break from rugby' following a series of poor results.

On 7 July 2022 he was appointed the defence coach of the Southern Knights.

== Family ==
Tait has a son, Michael, who was also a professional rugby union player. Michael appeared for the Scotland national under-20 rugby union team in 2010 and signed for Edinburgh in 2014 before retiring later the same year due to injury.
