= Marcus St Hilaire =

England & Ireland international rugby league footballer

Personal information
- Born: 26 January 1977 (age 49) Huddersfield, West Yorkshire, England

Playing information
- Height: 5 ft 10 in (1.78 m)
- Weight: 14 st 13 lb (95 kg)
- Position: Fullback, Wing, Centre
Club
Years	Team	Pld	T	G	FG	P
	Huddersfield Giants
1996–02	Leeds Rhinos	111	39	0	0	156
2003–05	Huddersfield Giants	74	30	0	0	120
2005	Halifax	0	0	0	0	0
2006–07	Bradford Bulls	39	12	0	0	56
2008–11	Oldham	86	31	0	0	124
	Total	310	112	0	0	456
Representative
Years	Team	Pld	T	G	FG	P
1999	England	2	4			16
2009	Ireland	2	1	0	0	4

Marcus St Hilaire (born 26 January 1977), also known by the nickname of "Junior", is a former professional rugby league footballer who played as a fullback, wing and centre in the 1990s, 2000s and 2010s. He played at representative level for England and Ireland, and at club level for the Huddersfield Giants (two spells), Leeds Rhinos, Halifax, Bradford Bulls and Oldham.

== Background ==
St Hilaire was born in Huddersfield, West Yorkshire, England, he is of Irish and Saint Lucian descent.

== Huddersfield ==
Huddersfield refused to select St Hilaire after he decided to pursue a transfer to Leeds.

== Leeds ==
St Hilaire was transferred from Huddersfield Giants to Leeds Rhinos in July 1996. "Junior", as he was known, became an integral part of the Leeds squad, especially under coach Graham Murray. He was voted the Yorkshire Evening Post / Leeds Rhinos Shooting Star of 1998 as the most improved player. and played for Leeds Rhinos from the substitutes' bench in their 1998 Super League Grand Final loss to Wigan Warriors.

A brilliant runner with the ball, all too often injuries prevented him from gaining the confidence he needed to shine for the Leeds Rhinos after 1999, the high point of his time at Headingley. In total he made 65 starts for Leeds Rhinos plus 46 substitute appearances leading to a total of 111 appearances. He scored 39 tries for a total of 156 points. St Hilaire was a try scorer at Wembley in the 1999 Challenge Cup Final when he was used in his normal role of coming on at full back to allow Iestyn Harris to move up to stand off in the second half. He played 2-matches for England in the 1999 Anglo-French Challenge. Although never having played rugby union at the top level, St Hilaire was selected for the England Sevens team in the 2002 Commonwealth Games, although he did not play in any of their four games.

== Huddersfield ==
Midway through the 2002's Super League VII, St Hilaire was released from the final year of his contract at the Leeds Rhinos and re-joined the Huddersfield Giants, where he helped the Huddersfield Giants regain their place in the Super League.

== Later years ==
After being released by the Huddersfield Giants after 2005's Super League X, St Hilaire joined Halifax. But after playing a small part in a friendly game for them, he signed for the Bradford Bulls for 2006's Super League XI as fullback cover. St Hilaire left the Bradford Bulls at the end of 2007's Super League XII, joining Oldham. In 2009 he represented Ireland. St Hilaire spent the remainder of his playing career at Oldham, announcing his retirement in 2011.
