= Richard Eyres =

GB, England & Wales international rugby league & union footballer

Richie Eyres
Personal information
- Full name: Richard Eyres
- Born: 7 December 1964 (age 60); St Helens, England

Playing information

Rugby league
- Position: Second-row, Loose forward
Club
Years	Team	Pld	T	G	FG	P
1984–93	Widnes	294	60	1	2	244
1993–96	Leeds	64+2	17	0	0	68
1997(loan)	→ Sheffield Eagles	2+3	0	0	0	0
1997	Warrington Wolves	3+5	0	0	0	0
1998	Rochdale Hornets	18+1	2	0	0	8
1999	Widnes Vikings	2	0	0	0	0
1999	Swinton Lions	11	3	0	0	12
	Total	405	82	1	2	332
Representative
Years	Team	Pld	T	G	FG	P
1988–91	Lancashire	3	0	0	0	0
1992	England	1	0	0	0	0
1993–98	Great Britain	9	2	0	0	8
1995–99	Wales	8	2	0	0	8

Rugby union
Club
Years	Team	Pld	T	G	FG	P
1996–97	Neath RFC
	Coventry R.F.C.
	Total	0	0	0	0	0

Richard 'Richie' Eyres (born 7 December 1964) is an English-born former professional rugby league and rugby union footballer who played in the 1980s and 1990s. He played international rugby league for Great Britain, England and Wales, and at club level for Blackbrook ARLFC, St Helens, Widnes St. Maries ARLFC, Widnes (two spells), Leeds, Warrington Wolves, Sheffield Eagles and Rochdale Hornets, as a second-row, or loose forward, and club level rugby union for Neath and Coventry.

== Background ==
Richie Eyres was born in St Helens, Lancashire, England, he has Welsh ancestors, and eligible to play for Wales due to the grandparent rule.

== Playing career ==
=== Widnes ===
Eyres played and scored a try in Widnes' 30–18 victory over Canberra Raiders in the 1989 World Club Challenge at Old Trafford, Manchester on Wednesday 4 October 1989.

He played for Widnes in the 1993 Challenge Cup final against Wigan, scoring a try in the 14–20 defeat, but was sent off for elbowing Martin Offiah. He was banned for six games.

=== Leeds ===
Eyres was signed by Leeds in August 1993, with a transfer fee of £135,000 being set via tribunal.

=== International honours ===
Richie Eyres won a cap for England while at Widnes in 1992 against Wales, won caps for Wales while at Leeds in 1995 against England, France, and in the 1995 Rugby League World Cup, against France, Western Samoa, and England, and while at Swinton in 1998 against England, and in 1999 against Ireland, and Scotland, and won caps for Great Britain while at Widnes in 1989 against France (interchange/substitute), in 1991 against France (twice, once as a substitute), in 1992 in the 1989–1992 Rugby League World Cup against France (interchange/substitute), and Australia (interchange/substitute), in 1993 against France (2 matches), and while at Leeds in 1993 against New Zealand (interchange/substitute) (2 matches).

Eyres is unusual in having initially represented England and then gone onto represent Wales.

=== Rugby union ===
In 1996, Eyres signed for Welsh rugby union club, Neath.

== Family ==
Eyres is the brother of the rugby league wing, and scrum-half of the 1980s and 1990s for Widnes, Keighley Cougars and Rochdale Hornets; Andy Eyres.
