= Marvin Golden =

English rugby league footballer

Personal information
- Born: 21 December 1976 (age 49) Leeds, West Yorkshire, England

Playing information
- Position: Wing, Centre
Club
Years	Team	Pld	T	G	FG	P
1994–99	Leeds Rhinos	74	23	0	0	92
1998	→ Bramley (loan)	9	3	0	0	12
2000	Halifax Blue Sox	24	6	0	0	24
2001	London Broncos	21	3	0	0	12
2002–03	Doncaster Dragons	50	21	0	0	84
2003	Widnes Vikings	4	1	0	0	4
2004	Hull Kingston Rovers	5	0	0	0	0
2005	Doncaster Dragons	7	3	0	0	12
	Total	194	60	0	0	240

Marvin Golden (born 21 December 1976) is an English former professional rugby league footballer who played in the 1990s and 2000s. He played at club for Hunslet Parkside ARLFC, the Leeds Rhinos including in 1996's, 1997's, 1998's and 1999's Super League, Bramley (loan), Halifax, the London Broncos in 2001's Super League, the Doncaster Dragons and the Widnes Vikings in 2003's Super League, he also played for Illawarra Steelers (non-First Grade) in Australia, as a wing, or centre.

== Background ==
Marvin Golden was born in Leeds, West Yorkshire, England, he now works for TRAD Safety Systems located in Morley, West Yorkshire, England.
