= Andy Hay (rugby league) =

English RL coach and former England international rugby league footballer

Personal information
- Full name: Andrew Hay
- Born: 5 November 1973 (age 53) Airedale, Castleford, England
- Height: 6 ft 1 in (1.85 m)
- Weight: 13 st 5 lb (85 kg)

Playing information
- Position: Second-row
Club
Years	Team	Pld	T	G	FG	P
1990–95	Castleford	75	18	0	0	72
1995–97	Sheffield Eagles	38	11	0	0	44
1997–02	Leeds Rhinos	165	50	0	0	200
2003–04	Widnes Vikings	56	8	0	0	32
2005	Doncaster Lakers	19	5	0	0	20
	Total	353	92	0	0	368
Representative
Years	Team	Pld	T	G	FG	P
1998	Emerging England	1	1	0	0	4
2000	England	3	2	0	0	8
	Yorkshire

Coaching information
Club
Years	Team	Gms	W	D	L	W%
2014–15	Featherstone Rovers	41	27	1	13	66
Representative
Years	Team	Gms	W	D	L	W%
2025–	Germany	2	2	0	0	100
- Source: As of 20 November 2026

Andrew Hay (born 5 November 1973) is an English rugby league coach and former player who played as a second-row forward. He played at representative level for England and Yorkshire, and at club level for Castleford Tigers, Sheffield Eagles, Leeds Rhinos, Widnes Vikings and Doncaster Lakers. He was formerly head coach at Featherstone Rovers.

== Background ==
Andy Hay was born in Airedale, Castleford, West Riding of Yorkshire, England.

His son Finley Hay plays for the London Broncos in the Betfred Championship.

== Playing career ==
Hay played junior rugby league for Redhill before turning professional in November 1990 with Castleford.

Hay appeared as a substitute (replacing centre Grant Anderson on 63-minutes) in Castleford Tigers' 33–2 victory over Wigan in the 1993–94 Regal Trophy Final during the 1993–94 season at Headingley, Leeds on Saturday 22 January 1994.

In July 1995, Hay was signed by Sheffield Eagles.

Hay joined Leeds in May 1997 for a fee of around £70,000. He appeared as a substitute for Leeds in their 1998 Super League Grand Final loss to Wigan. Hay was an England international and played at the 2000 Rugby League World Cup, scoring two tries in consecutive games against Russia and Fiji respectively.

Towards the end of his career, he played for Widnes Vikings, where he was captain.

== Coaching career ==
After retiring from playing, he returned to Castleford Tigers as a coach, working as an assistant to head coach Terry Matterson until his departure in 2011.

On 16 May 2014, he left the assistant coach role at the Salford Red Devils to take up the head coach role at Kingstone Press Championship club Featherstone Rovers.

On 25 August 2021, it was announced by Rugby League Deutschland that Andy had been appointed as their new performance director

On 18 October 2025, he coached Germany in their 72-10 win over Czech Republic in Hradec Králové.. A week later he coached Germany to a 32-18 win over Norway. He shares the head coach role with Bob Doughton.
