= Harvey Howard =

English rugby league coach and footballer

Personal information
- Full name: Harvey Howard
- Born: 29 August 1968 (age 57) Whiston, Merseyside, England

Playing information
- Height: 6 ft 0 in (1.83 m)
- Weight: 16 st 10 lb (106 kg)
- Position: Prop
Club
Years	Team	Pld	T	G	FG	P
1990–94	Widnes	66	5	0	0	20
1993	Eastern Suburbs	4	0	0	0	0
1994–96	Leeds	75	3	0	0	12
1996–99	Western Suburbs	59	1	0	0	4
1998	Bradford Bulls	6	1	0	0	4
2000	Brisbane Broncos	14	0	0	0	0
2001–02	Wigan Warriors	57	1	0	0	4
2003	Hull Kingston Rovers	12	2	0	0	8
	Total	293	13	0	0	52
Representative
Years	Team	Pld	T	G	FG	P
1995–2000	England	6	0	0	0	0
1998	Great Britain	1	0	0	0	0
1997	Rest of the World	1	0	0	0	0

Coaching information
Club
Years	Team	Gms	W	D	L	W%
2004–05	Hull Kingston Rovers	17	13	0	4	76

Harvey Howard is an English former professional rugby league footballer who played in the 1990s and 2000s. A Great Britain and England international representative prop, he played club football in England for Widnes, Leeds, Bradford Bulls and Wigan, and in Australia for the Eastern Suburbs Roosters, Western Suburbs Magpies and the Brisbane Broncos, with whom he won the 2000 grand final.

== Playing career ==
=== Widnes ===
Howard joined Widnes in 1990 from rugby union club Waterloo. During his early career at the club, Howard played on the wing, deputising for Martin Offiah. He was later converted into a prop forward by coach Doug Laughton, which would become his preferred position.

Howard played left-second-row in Widnes 24–0 victory over Leeds in the 1991–92 Regal Trophy Final during the 1991–92 season at Central Park, Wigan on Saturday 11 January 1992. He played right-prop in Widnes' 14-20 defeat by Wigan in the 1993 Challenge Cup Final during the 1992–93 season at Wembley Stadium, London on Saturday 1 May 1993. During the summer in 1993, he played for Eastern Suburbs.

=== Leeds ===
In January 1994, Howard was signed by Leeds for a fee of £100,000.

He played right-prop in Leeds' 16-26 defeat by Wigan in the 1994 Challenge Cup Final during the 1993–94 season at Wembley Stadium, London on Saturday 30 April 1994, and played left-prop in the 10-30 defeat by Wigan in the 1995 Challenge Cup Final during the 1994–95 season at Wembley Stadium, London on Saturday 29 April 1995. Also while at Leeds, in 1995 he won his first international cap for England against Wales.

=== Australia ===
During his time with the Western Suburbs Magpies on the playing roster, he gained several nicknames, including Harves and Harvester, freight, but also mainly as Night Train. This was because of a song at the time which he insisted the whole team listen to a song called "Night Train". In 1997, he played for the 'Rest of the World' against Australia. In 1998, Howard briefly returned to England, signing a short-term contract with Bradford Bulls. While at Bradford Bulls, he won a cap for Great Britain against New Zealand as a substitute.

After four seasons with Wests in the late 1990s. Howard played in Western Suburbs final ever game in the NRL as a stand-alone entity which was a 60-16 loss against the Auckland Warriors at Campbelltown Stadium. Howard could not win a place in the joint team, Wests Tigers but Wayne Bennett had no such concern, using Howard as a stop-gap Prop and bringing him off the bench in the Broncos' 2000 NRL Grand Final win over the Sydney Roosters. After that Howard represented England in the 2000 Rugby League World Cup, also mostly from the interchange bench.

=== Later career ===
He played prop for the Wigan Warriors in the 2001 Super League Grand Final defeat by the Bradford Bulls. He went on to play for Hull Kingston Rovers, but was forced to retire in 2004 after being injured in a car crash.

== Post playing ==
Harvey returned to Australia on a permanent basis, and now works full-time for the Western Suburbs Magpies DRLFC as Development officer, in charge of the junior grades of football, as well as the Junior Magpies development teams.

Howard was appointed Hull Kingston Rovers' first team coach in late 2004. Howard was dismissed shortly before the Northern Rail Cup Final, which the Hull Kingston Rovers went on to win 18-16 over Castleford Tigers, with the Hull Kingston Rovers utilising the temporary player-coaching abilities of James Webster. Permanently taking over from Howard was the former Toulouse coach, Justin Morgan.
