= Jim Fallon (rugby) =

English rugby league & union footballer

Personal information
- Full name: James Anthony Fallon
- Born: 27 March 1965 (age 61) Windsor, England
- Height: 6 ft 1 in (1.85 m)
- Weight: 14 st 9 lb (93 kg)

Playing information

Rugby union
- Position: Wing
Club
Years	Team	Pld	T	G	FG	P
1990–92	Bath	45	30	0	0	120
1996–98	Richmond
1998	Bath	5	0	0	0	0
	Total	50	30	0	0	120

Rugby league
- Position: Wing
Club
Years	Team	Pld	T	G	FG	P
1992–96	Leeds	140	74	0	0	296

James Anthony Fallon (born 27 March 1965) is an English former rugby union and rugby league player who played in the 1990s. He played club rugby union as a wing for Bath (two spells) and Richmond, and rugby league for Leeds, also as a wing.

== Playing career ==
Born in Windsor, Fallon attended Belmont Abbey School in Herefordshire. He started his playing career in rugby union. He joined Bath in 1990, helping them win the 1991–92 Pilkington Cup. He also represented England B against Spain.

In 1992, he was persuaded to switch codes by Leeds coach Doug Laughton. He was a losing finalist with Leeds in the 1993–94 and 1994–95 Challenge Cup.

He returned to rugby union in 1996, joining Richmond. He returned to Bath before retiring in 1999 on medical advice following an operation on a detached retina.
