= Gavin Brown (rugby league) =

English rugby league footballer

Personal information
- Born: 18 September 1977 (age 47)

Playing information
- Position: Stand-off, Scrum-half
Club
| Years | Team | Pld | T | G | FG | P |
|---|---|---|---|---|---|---|
| 1996–99 | Leeds Rhinos | 8 | 1 | 2 | 0 | 8 |
| 1998 | → Bramley (loan) | 19 | 3 | 13 | 1 | 39 |
| 2000–09 | Sheffield Eagles | 196 | 35 | 382 | 22 | 926 |
| | Total | 223 | 39 | 397 | 23 | 973 |

Gavin Brown (born 18 September 1977) is an English former professional rugby league footballer who played in the 1990s and 2000s. He played at representative level for Great Britain Academy, and at club level for Milford ARLFC (in Kirkstall, Leeds) of the National Conference League, Leeds Rhinos, Bramley (loan), and Sheffield Eagles, as a stand-off, or scrum-half.

== Playing career ==
=== International honours ===
Gavin Brown played for Great Britain Academy in 1996 against France Academy, and on tour against the Junior Kiwis.

=== Club career ===
Gavin Brown was transferred from Milford ARLFC to Leeds in July 1994, he made his début for Leeds Rhinos as an interchange/substitute against Bradford Bulls in 1996's Super League I at Odsal Stadium, Bradford during May 1996. He played five matches during Super League I, including three starts, he scored a try in the last home game of 1996's Super League I against Workington Town, at Headingley, Leeds, and he kicked two goals against Halifax in the last match of 1996's Super League I, at Thrum Hall, Halifax, he played on loan at Bramley during 1998. He was transferred from Leeds Rhinos to Sheffield Eagles.
