= Jamie Field =

English rugby league footballer

Personal information
- Full name: Jamie Field
- Born: 12 December 1976 (age 49) Bradford, England

Playing information
- Position: Prop, Second-row, Loose forward
Club
Years	Team	Pld	T	G	FG	P
1995–97	Leeds Rhinos	28	0	0	0	0
1998(loan)	→ Huddersfield Giants	20	0	0	0	0
1999–06	Wakefield Trinity Wildcats	202	23	0	0	92
2007–10	Featherstone Rovers	86	17	0	0	68
	Total	336	40	0	0	160

Jamie Field (born 12 December 1976) is an English former professional rugby league footballer who played for the Leeds Rhinos, the Huddersfield Giants, the Wakefield Trinity Wildcats, and Featherstone Rovers as a prop, second-row, or loose forward.

== Background ==
Field was born in Bradford, West Yorkshire, England.

== Career ==
Field joined Leeds from amateur club Dewsbury Moor in September 1993. He made his début in the 1995–96 season, and went on to make 28 appearances for the club. He was loaned to Huddersfield Giants in 1998, appearing 20 times during the Super League III season.

He spent the majority of his Super League career at Wakefield Trinity Wildcats, where he played for eight seasons before being released at the end of 2006.

He then joined Featherstone Rovers from 2007–2010 until he retired from rugby league.

=== Testimonial match ===
Field's benefit season/testimonial match at Featherstone Rovers, allocated by the Rugby Football League, took place during the 2010 season.

== Outside of rugby league ==
Field has owned the personal training gym "5 Star Fitness" since 2004. He runs the gym chain with several other current and former professional sportsmen, including Chris Annakin, (rugby league player) and Kenny Milne (former footballer).

He married Tracy Rogerson In 2000. Their first child, Oliver, was born in 2002, and their second child, Amelia, was born 4 years later in 2006. Jamie now lives in Tadcaster with Tracy, Oliver and Amelia.
