= Graham Holroyd =

English rugby league & union footballer

Personal information
- Born: 25 October 1975 (age 50) Halifax, West Yorkshire, England

Playing information

Rugby league
- Position: Stand-off
Club
Years	Team	Pld	T	G	FG	P
1993–98	Leeds Rhinos	170	50	373	14	960
1999	Halifax	27	5	87	5	199
2000–02	Salford City Reds	52	8	74	5	185
2003	Huddersfield Giants	8	0	0	0	0
2003–07	Doncaster	95	36	354	8	860
2007–08	Halifax	46	10	231	0	502
2009–10	Swinton Lions	26	6	25	2	76
2010–11	Halifax	17	2	32	1	73
2012	Oldham	5	0	6	0	12
	Total	446	117	1182	35	2867

Rugby union
- Position: Fly-half
Club
Years	Team	Pld	T	G	FG	P
2002–03	Halifax	19	7	34	33	202
2011–12	Preston	22	0	45	35	195
	Total	41	7	79	68	397

Graham Holroyd (born 25 October 1975) is an English rugby league and rugby union footballer who played for Halifax and Oldham RLFC as a stand-off. He re-joined Halifax after a two-year spell with Swinton. He won the Championship with Halifax in 2010, beating Featherstone Rovers 23–22.

== Playing career ==
=== Club career ===
A former junior at Siddal, Holroyd made his professional rugby league debut for Leeds in the 1992–93 season. He played for Leeds in their Challenge Cup final defeats against Wigan in 1994 and 1995, and also started in the heavy defeat against Wigan in the 1994–95 Premiership final at Old Trafford. He was a substitute for Leeds in the inaugural 1998 Super League Grand Final.

=== Representative honours ===
In 1998, he played for Emerging England in a 15–12 victory over Wales. He had been named in the Ireland training squad for the 2008 Rugby League World Cup but was not included in the final side due to a knee injury sustained in training.

=== Rugby union ===
Although Graham spent most of his career playing rugby league he did spend several seasons playing rugby union at northern clubs Halifax (2002–03) and Preston Grasshoppers (2011–12).
