= Francis Cummins =

English RL coach and former GB, England & Ireland international rugby league footballer

Franny Cummins
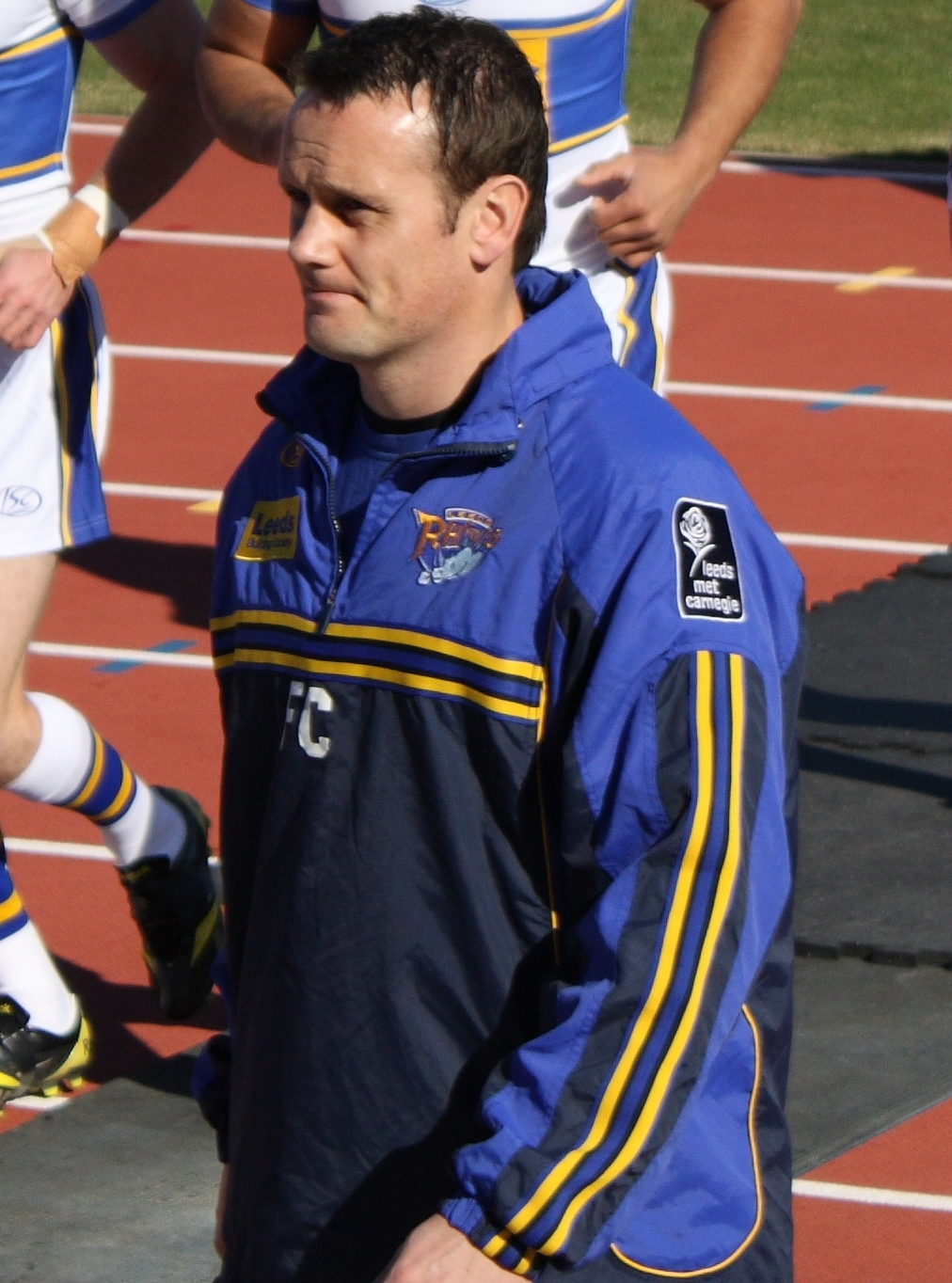

Personal information
- Full name: Francis Cummins
- Born: 12 October 1976 (age 49) Dewsbury, West Yorkshire, England

Playing information
- Position: Fullback, Wing, Centre
Club
Years	Team	Pld	T	G	FG	P
1993–2005	Leeds Rhinos	356	188	79	2	912
Representative
Years	Team	Pld	T	G	FG	P
1995	England	2	3	0	0	12
1998–99	Great Britain	3	0	0	0	0
2001–05	Ireland	5	2	0	0	8
2001	Yorkshire	1	0	0	0	0

Coaching information
Club
Years	Team	Gms	W	D	L	W%
2013–14	Bradford Bulls	48	17	2	29	35
2018	Widnes Vikings	15	1	0	14	7
	Total	63	18	2	43	29

Francis Cummins (born 12 October 1976) is the former Head Coach of the Widnes Vikings in the Super League and an English professional rugby league coach and former player. He was the head coach of Super League team the Bradford Bulls from September 2012 until July 2014. A Great Britain and England international representative wing, Cummins also played for Ireland at fullback, and played his entire professional career with the Leeds Rhinos, with whom he won the 1999 Challenge Cup Final.

== Background ==
Francis Cummins was born and grew up in Dewsbury, West Yorkshire, England.

Was the captain of both St. John Fisher's school team (1988–93) which were regular finalists in the Yorkshire Cup, and St. John Fisher's ARLFC. St. John Fisher's school team has produced some notable English rugby league talents over the years including Francis Maloney, Ryan Sheridan, Matt Diskin, Adrian Flynn and Tommy Gallagher. His sporting heroes growing up were former Leeds star Garry Schofield, and ex-Manchester United, and England football captain, Bryan Robson. When playing at St. John Fisher, his preferred position was stand-off, and he was also the designated goal-kicker. Francis represented England schoolboys when he was 15 years old.

== Playing career ==
=== Leeds ===
Cummins played for Leeds throughout his whole career between 1993–2005. He is the youngest player ever to appear in a Rugby League Challenge Cup at Wembley Stadium, London. He was aged just 17 years and 200 days when Leeds lost to Wigan in 1994, although Francis did score a memorable length-of-the-field try during the match.

Cummins played for Leeds Rhinos as a centre in their 1998 Super League Grand Final loss to the Wigan Warriors.

Francis set a new club record for consecutive appearances for Leeds Rhinos at the end of the 2003's Super League VIII with a total of 178 appearances. He is the seventh highest try scorer in the history of the club with total of 188 tries at the end of 2004, making him the most prolific try scorer in the past twenty years of the club. Francis Cummins' Testimonial match at Leeds Rhinos took place in 2004.

He announced his retirement as a player at the end of the 2005 season.

=== International ===
Cummins has also played on several occasions for Great Britain, and also Ireland at international level.

Francis made his début for England in 1995 against France at Gateshead when he scored a hat-trick of tries, he then played for Emerging England in 1998 against Wales. He made his Great Britain début later that year playing in the last two Tests against New Zealand.

In 1999 he gained two more caps for Great Britain in the Tri-Series against Australia and New Zealand. Unfortunately, injury struck in 2000 and Francis made the tough decision to pull out of that year's World Cup. He was later to rate this as the worst moment of his career.

2001 saw Francis revert to playing for Ireland, making his début in France. He continued this in 2003 when he played as a fullback in both matches for Ireland in the European Nations Cup.

== Coaching career ==
Following his retirement from playing for the Leeds Rhinos in 2005, Cummins subsequently continued the 12 year association when he became assistant coach at the Leeds Rhinos in 2006.

In 2010 Francis decided to leave Leeds Rhinos and take the opportunity as the assistant coach at West Yorkshire rivals, the Bradford Bulls for the upcoming season. After a two-year period as assistant coach to Mick Potter, Cummins was appointed as head coach of the Bradford Bulls in September 2012. He was sacked on 16 July 2014.

On 7 November 2023 it was reported that he had joined the backroom staff at Hull FC following his departure from Wakefield Trinity

== Personal life ==
In 2001 Francis Cummins married Katy and has three children.
