= Phil Hassan =

English rugby footballer

Personal information
- Full name: Phil Hassan
- Born: 18 August 1974 (age 51) Wigan, England

Playing information
- Height: 6 ft 0 in (1.83 m)
- Weight: 13 st 7 lb (85 kg)

Rugby league
- Position: Wing, Centre
Club
Years	Team	Pld	T	G	FG	P
1993–97	Leeds Rhinos	71	16	0	0	64
1998	Salford City Reds	15	2	0	0	8
2000–01	Halifax	33	3	0	0	12
2002	Wakefield Trinity Wildcats	10	0	0	0	0
2003	Swinton Lions
	Total	129	21	0	0	84

Rugby union
Club
Years	Team	Pld	T	G	FG	P
1997–98	Worcester Warriors
2001–02	Fylde
	Total	0	0	0	0	0

Phil Hassan (born 18 August 1974) is a former rugby league and rugby union footballer who played in the 1990s and 2000s. He played club level rugby league (RL) for Leeds, Salford, Halifax, Wakefield Trinity and Swinton, as a wing, or centre, and club level rugby union (RU) for Worcester and Fylde.

== Leeds career ==
Hassan was born in Wigan on 18 August 1974. Hassan joined Leeds in August 1993, making his début in his first season. Hassan joined from Wigan-based amateur club St Pat's. Hassan played against his home town club in the crushing Premiership Trophy Final of 1995. Hassan was a regular in the Leeds first team squad over the next three seasons but his big break through came at the start of Super League when he made 24 appearances and scored four tries. Hassan established himself in the Leeds first team and kicked on the following season, missing only one game and scoring 11 tries, including a spectacular long range try in both games against Salford that season. In total, Hassan played 71 times for Leeds scoring 16 tries, however the arrival of Brad Godden meant there was no place for Hassan at Headingley.

== Rugby career ==
Hassan moved on from Leeds at the end of the 1997 season, switching codes to play rugby union with Worcester (RU). Hassan returned to rugby league with Salford before joining Halifax in 2000. At the end of the 2001 season, Hassan was released by the Halifax, and again switched codes to join Fylde (RU), in April 2002 again returned to rugby league joining Wakefield Trinity, and later Swinton.
