= Esene Faimalo =

New Zealand & Western Samoa international rugby league footballer

Personal information
- Born: 11 October 1966 (age 59)

Playing information
- Position: Prop
Club
Years	Team	Pld	T	G	FG	P
19??–87	Addington (CRL)
1988–??	Sydenham (CRL)
1990	Upper Hutt Tigers
1990–94	Widnes	111	11	0	0	44
1994–96	Leeds Rhinos	53	7	0	0	28
1997–99	Salford Reds	62	2	0	0	8
2000	Widnes Vikings	5	0	0	0	0
	Total	231	20	0	0	80
Representative
Years	Team	Pld	T	G	FG	P
1986–89	Canterbury
	South Island
1986	Western Samoa
1988–91	New Zealand	5	0	0	0	0
1990	Wellington
1991	Canterbury

Esene Faimalo (born 11 October 1966) is a former professional rugby league footballer who played in the 1980s and 1990s, who represented both Western Samoa and New Zealand at international level.

== Playing career ==
In 1985 Faimalo came second in the New Zealand boxing Heavyweight tournament and also made the Junior Kiwis while playing for the Linwood club. Faimalo represented Western Samoa at the 1986 Pacific Cup.

A Canterbury representative from the Addington club, Faimalo also represented the New Zealand national rugby league team between 1988 and 1991, playing in five test matches. Faimalo spent 1989 with the Balmain Tigers as part of the New Zealand Rugby League's "Rookie Scheme".

In 1990 he moved to England, signing with the Widnes Vikings. He played for the club for four seasons, making 111 appearances and scoring 11 tries, before signing with the Leeds Rhinos in 1994, where he scored seven tries in 54 appearances. He joined the Salford City Reds during 1996's Super League I season, playing with the club for three years. He returned to Widnes in 2000, making a further five appearances before retiring.

In 2010 Faimalo entered the boxing ring in a charity bout to raise money for the Steve Prescott Foundation.

== Personal life ==
Esene Faimalo is the brother of the rugby league footballer Joe Faimalo.
