= Gary Mercer =

NZ RL & RU coach and former NZ international rugby league footballer

Personal information
- Full name: Gary Ivan Mercer
- Born: 22 June 1966 (age 59); Tauranga, New Zealand

Playing information
- Height: 180 cm (5 ft 11 in)
- Position: Fullback, Wing, Second-row
Club
Years	Team	Pld	T	G	FG	P
	Pikiao (BOPRL)
1987–89	Bradford Northern	40	17	1	0	70
1989–92	Warrington	82	16	3	0	70
1992–97	Leeds Rhinos	158	43	0	0	172
1998–01	Halifax Blue Sox	76	16	0	0	64
2001	Warrington Wolves	18	2	0	0	8
2001	Leeds Rhinos	6	0	0	0	0
2002	Castleford Tigers	1	0	0	0	0
	Total	381	94	4	0	384
Representative
Years	Team	Pld	T	G	FG	P
	Bay of Plenty
	Northern Districts
	NZ Māori
1987–93	New Zealand	21	4	0	0	16
1988	Rest of the World	1	0	1	0	2

Coaching information

Rugby league
Club
Years	Team	Gms	W	D	L	W%
1999–00	Halifax Blue Sox	58	22	1	35	38
2004	Castleford Tigers	21	6	0	15	29
2005	Oldham RLFC	0	0	0	0
	Total	79	28	1	50	35

Rugby union
Representative
Years	Team	Gms	W	D	L	W%
2005-12; 2012-14	Glasgow Warriors; Scottish Rugby Academy; Glasgow Hawks; Biggar

Gary Ivan Mercer (born 22 June 1966) is a New Zealand rugby league and rugby union coach and former professional rugby league footballer. A New Zealand international representative player, he has spent most of his career in Britain both playing and coaching. He is a former defence coach of Glasgow Warriors and a former coach at the SRU working in their Scottish Rugby Academy. As of March 2016, he was the head coach of Biggar RFC.

== Playing career ==
In his long career he has represented the New Zealand national rugby league team within rugby league and New Zealand Māori sides and has played for the Leeds Rhinos, Bradford Northern, Warrington Wolves, Castleford Tigers and Halifax.

=== Challenge Cup Final appearances ===
Gary Mercer played at centre in Warrington's 14-36 defeat by Wigan in the 1990 Challenge Cup Final during the 1989–90 season at Wembley Stadium, London on Saturday 28 April 1990, in front of a crowd of 77,729.

=== County Cup Final appearances ===
Gary Mercer played fullback in Bradford Northern's 12-12 draw with Castleford in the 1987 Yorkshire Cup Final during the 1987–88 season at Headingley, Leeds on Saturday 17 October 1987, and played at centre in the 11-2 victory over Castleford in the 1987 Yorkshire Cup Final replay during the 1987–88 season at Elland Road, Leeds on Saturday 31 October 1987.

=== Regal Trophy Final appearances ===
Gary Mercer played at second-row in Warrington's 12-2 victory over Bradford Northern in the 1990–91 Regal Trophy Final during the 1990–91 season at Headingley, Leeds on Saturday 12 January 1991.

== Coaching career ==
=== Rugby League ===
Mercer was also the player-coach at the Halifax Blue Sox, and coach at the Castleford Tigers, his first game in charge was on 25 April 2004, and his last game in charge was on 18 September 2004.

=== Rugby Union ===
==== Glasgow Warriors ====
Mercer switched to rugby union and became the defence coach for the Glasgow Warriors from June 2005 to June 2012 leaving the Warriors at the same time as Sean Lineen. While he was there praise was heaped on his defensive coaching.

==== Scotland ====
He became the Scotland Under-20 assistant coach and worked with the Under-21 side. He then worked for the Scottish Rugby Academy.

==== Yorkshire Carnegie ====
He left the Scottish academy in August 2014 to have a brief spell running Yorkshire Carnegie.

==== Glasgow Hawks ====
Mercer was the head coach of Glasgow Hawks.

==== Biggar ====
Mercer moved on to Biggar.

==== FUDs ====
Founding member of the FUDs society, with co-members Toby Harris and Nathan Rainbow.
