= Neil Harmon =

GB & Ireland international rugby league footballer

Personal information
- Full name: Neil Anthony Harmon
- Born: 9 January 1969 (age 57) Haydock, St Helens, Merseyside, England

Playing information
- Position: Prop, Second-row
Club
Years	Team	Pld	T	G	FG	P
1986–93	Warrington	120+27	14	0	0	56
1993–96	Leeds Rhinos	79+24	11	0	0	44
1997–98	Huddersfield	38+1	5	0	0	20
1998–00	Bradford Bulls	10+1	1	0	0	4
2001	Salford City Reds	6+5	0	0	0	0
2003	Halifax	13+3	0	0	0	0
2005	Hull Kingston Rovers	6	0	0	0	0
	Total	333	31	0	0	124
Representative
Years	Team	Pld	T	G	FG	P
1997–01	Ireland	5+1	0	0	0	0
1996	GB tour games	2+2	0	0	0	0

Neil Anthony Harmon (born 9 January 1969) is a former professional rugby league footballer who played in the 1980s, 1990s and 2000s. He played at representative level for Great Britain & Ireland as a British Lion on the 1996 Tour to Papua New Guinea, Fiji and New Zealand Ireland, and at club level for Warrington, Leeds Rhinos, Huddersfield Giants, Bradford Bulls, Salford City Reds and Halifax, as prop, or second-row.

== Playing career ==
=== International honours ===
Neil Harmon was a British Lion on the 1996 Great Britain & Ireland Rugby League Tour to Papua New Guinea, Fiji and New Zealand. He also won five caps (plus one as a substitute) for Ireland in 1997–2001 while at Huddersfield Giants, Bradford Bulls, and Salford City Reds.

=== Challenge Cup Final appearances ===
Neil Harmon played at prop in Warrington's 14-36 defeat by Wigan in the 1990 Challenge Cup Final during the 1989–90 season at Wembley Stadium, London on Saturday 28 April 1990, in front of a crowd of 77,729.

=== County Cup Final appearances ===
Neil Harmon appeared as a substitute (replacing Hooker Carl Webb) in Warrington's 16-28 defeat by Wigan in the 1987 Lancashire Cup Final during the 1987–88 season at Knowsley Road, St. Helens on Sunday 11 October 1987.

=== Regal Trophy Final appearances ===
Neil Harmon played at prop (replaced by substitute Rowland Phillips on 79-minutes) in Warrington's 12-2 victory over Bradford Northern in the 1990–91 Regal Trophy Final during the 1990–91 season at Headingley, Leeds on Saturday 12 January 1991.
