= Bernard Gould =

Wales international rugby league footballer (born 1893)

- Cigarette card featuring Gould

Personal information
- Full name: Bernard Gould
- Born: 1 April 1893 Penarth, Wales
- Died: 20 February 1965 (aged 71) Leeds, England

Playing information
- Height: 6 ft 0 in (183 cm)
- Weight: 14 st 4 lb (91 kg)
- Position: Prop, Hooker
Club
Years	Team	Pld	T	G	FG	P
≤1921–21	Leeds
1921–26	Wakefield Trinity	102	6	1	0	20
	Total	102	6	1	0	20
Representative
Years	Team	Pld	T	G	FG	P
	Other Nationalities
1921–23	Wales	3
- Source: As of 21 June 2012

Bernard Gould (1 April 1893 – 20 February 1965) was a Welsh professional rugby league footballer who played in the 1920s. He played at representative level for Wales and Other Nationalities, and at club level for Leeds and Wakefield Trinity, as a prop or hooker.

== Background ==
Gould was born in Penarth, Wales. He was a prize fighter before his rugby career, he was the landlord of the Commercial Inn public house, Thornes Lane, Wakefield from 1923 until 1932. He was subsequently the landlord at the Templar Hotel pub (a Melbourne Brewery house), in Vicar Lane, Leeds, he retired aged c. 70 in c. 1963, and he died in Leeds, West Riding of Yorkshire, England.

He was married to Norah Winifred Mahoney, who worked as a bookkeeper for the Cunard Lines, and they fathered two sons, Bernard and Stanley, both of whom are deceased (in the 1970s).

== Playing career ==
=== International honours ===
Bernard Gould won 3 caps for Wales in 1921–1923 while at Leeds and Wakefield Trinity, and won a cap for Other Nationalities while at Leeds.

=== County Cup Final appearances ===
Bernard Gould played at prop in Leeds' 11–3 victory over Dewsbury in the 1921–22 Yorkshire Cup Final during the 1921–22 season at Thrum Hall, Halifax on Saturday 26 November 1921, and played at prop in Wakefield Trinity's 9–8 victory over Batley in the 1924–25 Yorkshire Cup Final during the 1924–25 season at Headingley, Leeds on Saturday 22 November 1924.

=== Club career ===
Bernard Gould made his début for Wakefield Trinity during February 1922.
