= Briggate =

Shopping street in Leeds, England

Coordinates: 53.7969°N 1.5424°W

Briggate in July 2026

Briggate is a pedestrianised principal shopping street in Leeds city centre, England, considered by Leeds City Council to be "the busiest 'High Street' in the region". Historically, it was the main street leading north from Leeds Bridge, and housed markets, merchants' houses and other business premises. It contains many historic buildings, including the oldest in the city, and others from the 19th and early-20th century, including two theatres. It is noted for the yards between some older buildings with alleyways giving access and Victorian shopping arcades, which were restored in late 20th century. The street was pedestrianised in the late-20th century.

== History ==
=== Early history ===
Briggate's name comes from brycg, the Old English for bridge and gata, the Old Norse for a way or a street. It is the road leading north from Leeds Bridge, the oldest crossing point of the River Aire, and the main street in Leeds from its formation as a borough in 1207. When Leeds became a borough, land on either side of Briggate was allocated into 30 burgage plots for tradespeople to carry out their business, setting the style and layout of the street today. A burgage plot was a strip with a length of between 10 and 18 perches and a width of 3 perches, i.e. 49 ft 6 in (15.09 m) in width running east or west from the road. This spacing can still be seen on many of the shop frontages and the buildings behind. The burgesses were also allocated half-acre agricultural plots in Burmantofts (burgage men's tofts). The street developed as the commercial centre, fairs and markets were held there by the end of the 13th century, when the woollen industry was beginning to grow. Leeds fair was held annually on Briggate from 1322 and from 1341 there were two.

=== 16th century ===
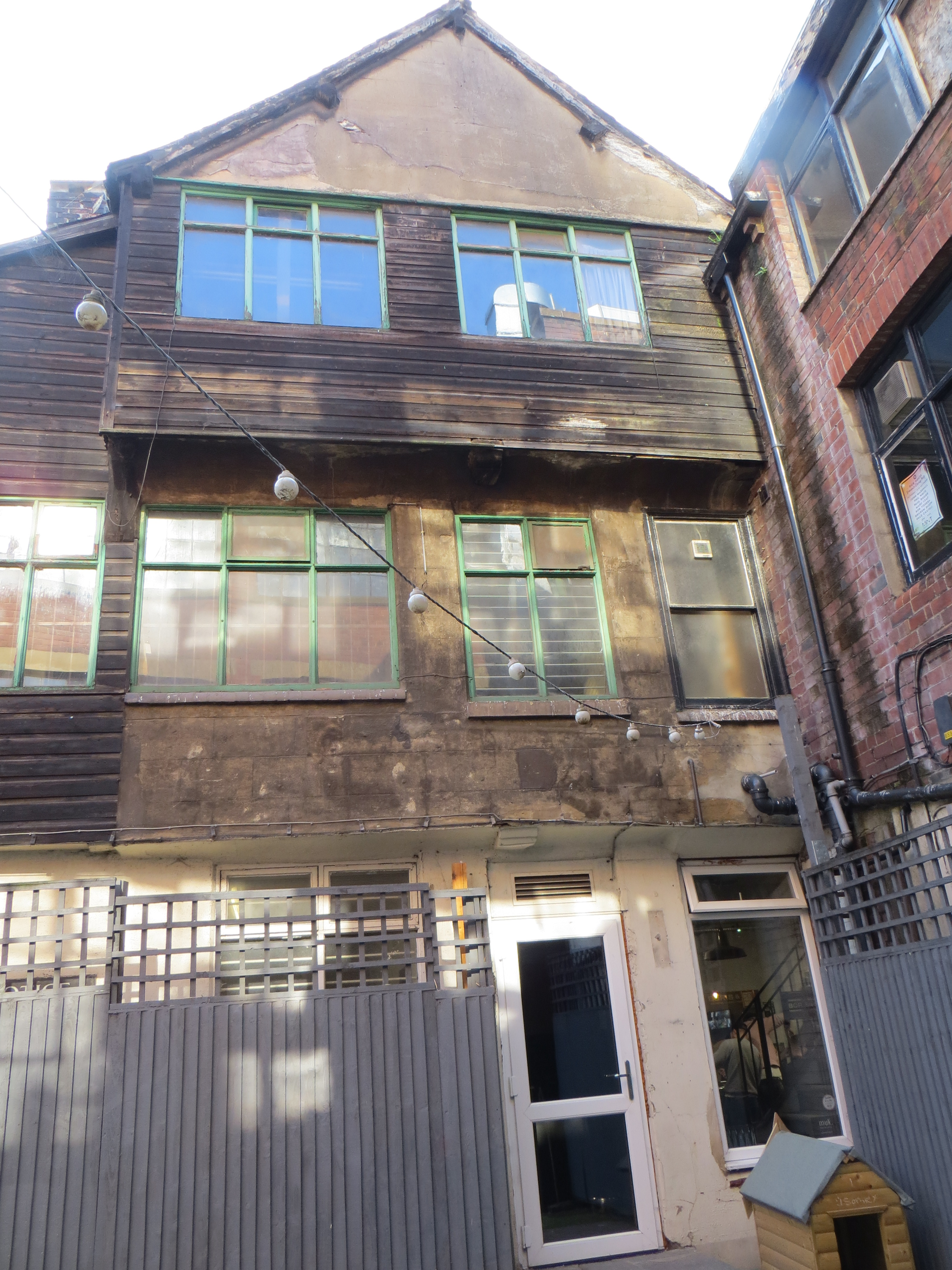
House in Lambert's Yard

In 1533, Leeds was described as "a praty market" consisting of four streets, Briggate, Kirkgate, Swinegate and Boar Lane, plus the "Head Rows". Leeds' oldest building, a three-storey wooden house with a projecting upper storey in Lambert's Yard, off Lower Briggate was built in the late-16th or early-17th century.

=== 17th century ===
By the 17th century, Briggate was lined with shops, offices, workshops and houses, grand and humble. It retained its medieval street pattern, but the burgage plots had been subdivided. The street was wide enough to accommodate open air markets. At this time the street ended in fields at what is now the Headrow and a field path continued north. John Harrison, a wealthy cloth merchant and the King's Bailiff, owned land north of Briggate. He built a town house at the north end and extended the street into what is now New Briggate, then New Street. Harrison paid for a new Moot Hall and market cross by the market place on Briggate in 1615, and the grammar school on New Street in 1624. He endowed the St John's Church which opened in 1634 to the west of New Street.

The Battle of Leeds took place principally along Briggate during the English Civil War in 1643.

=== 18th century ===
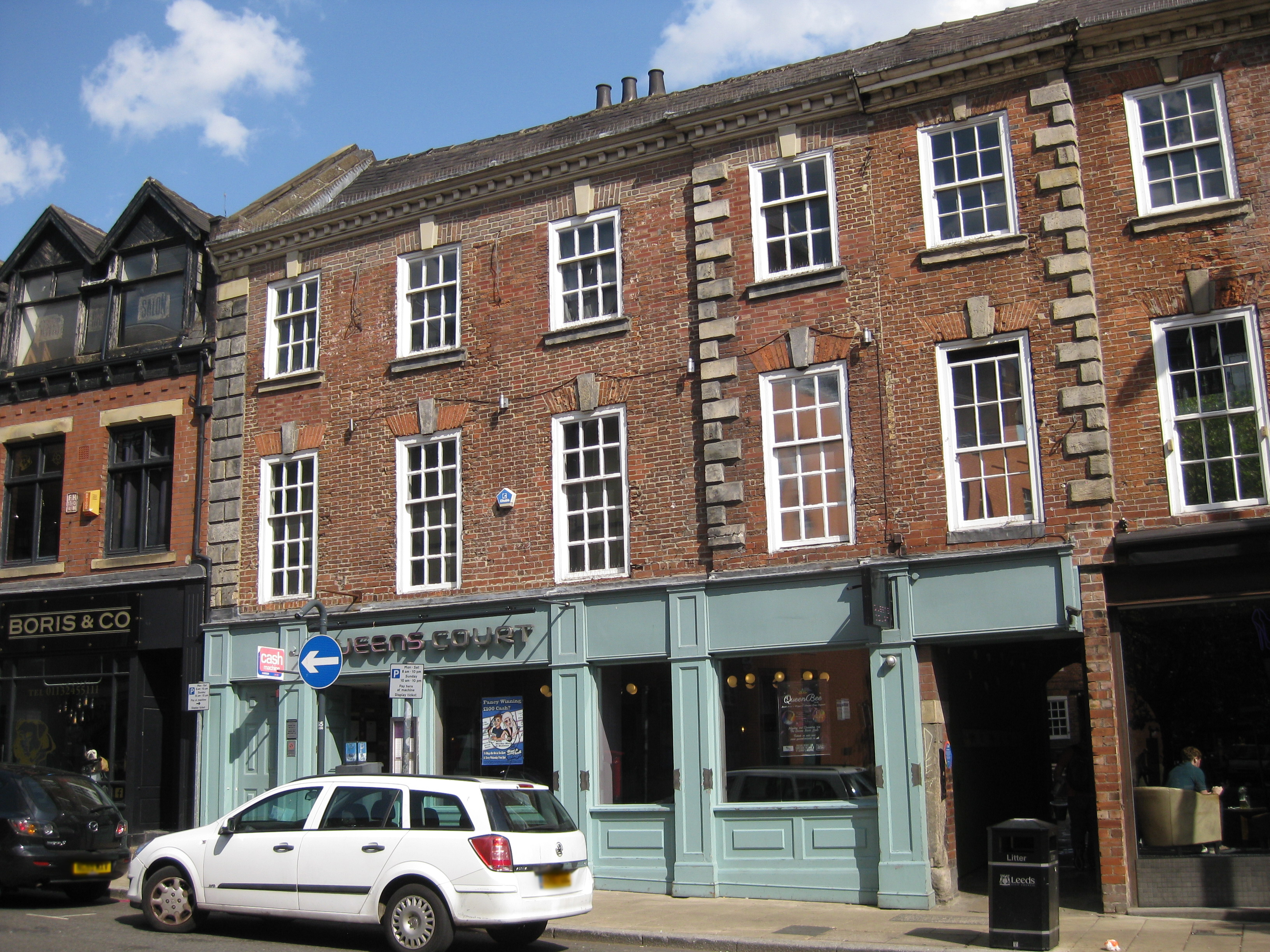
Queens Court

In the 18th century, Briggate housed the shambles or slaughter place and meat market described by Ralph Thoresby as "the best-furnished Flesh Shambles in the North of England". The street was lined with fine three-storey merchant's houses often with gardens and fields behind them. A surviving example is Queen's Court (1714), a former cloth merchant's house and business premises with packaging workshops and warehouses behind. It is now a gay bar. During the 18th century, the population grew from 6000 to 25000 leading to overcrowding. Many merchants moved their homes away from Briggate to Park Square leaving their properties to be subdivided and converted for commercial use or multiple residences. The lanes and yards off the street were filled with slum cottages and workplaces in the 18th and 19th centuries.

=== 19th century ===
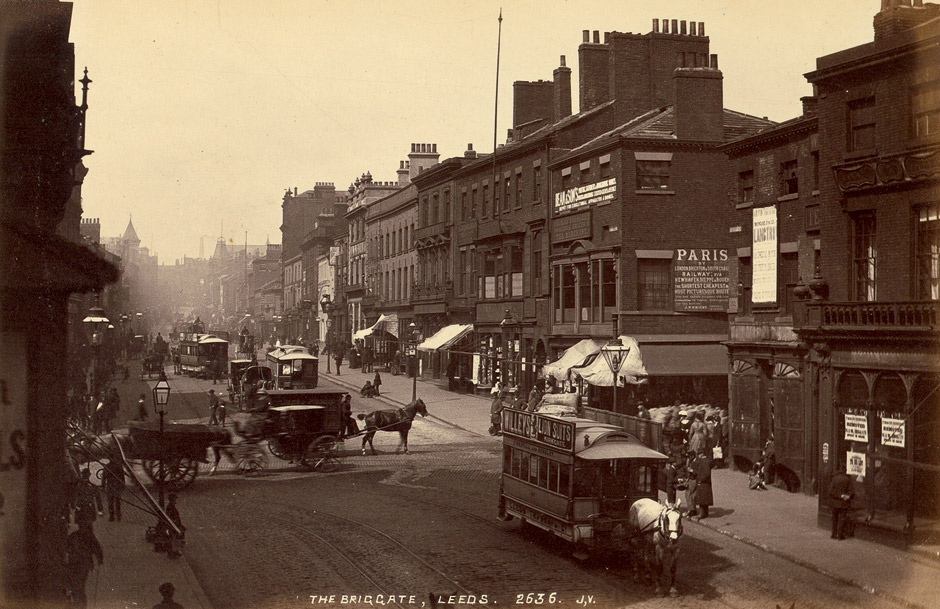
Briggate in 1880

In the early-19th century, Leeds was a "smokey city, dull and dirty", with Briggate its "one large street" but in 1889 it was "one of the broadest, handsomest, and busiest thoroughfares in the North of England". Leeds' commercial success led to the construction of many fine buildings, including the Grand Theatre on New Briggate in 1878. Land on Briggate, owned in the medieval form of long strips leading in both directions from the street, was suitable for the construction of shopping arcades, beginning with Thornton's Arcade in 1878. The Leeds Estate Company was formed to redevelop the shambles and surrounding slums. Redevelopment was carried out from 1898 to 1904 under the direction of architect Frank Matcham who created two new streets between Briggate and Vicar Lane: Queen Victoria Street and King Edward Street. The three blocks around them included the Empire Theatre and County and Cross Arcades.

In 1819 Alice Mann's bookshop and publishers on Briggate, according to the Leeds Intelligencer, appeared 'to be the head quarters of sedition in this town'.

=== 20th century ===
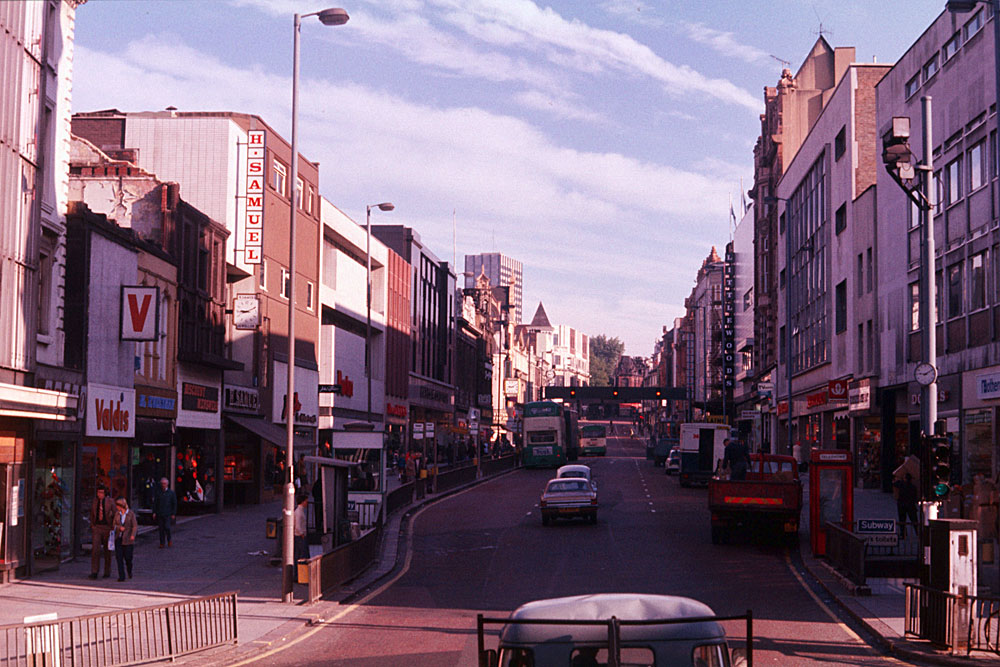
Briggate in 1978

From the early 1900s trams ran along Briggate, until Leeds tramways closed in 1959. In 1907 a Post Office Exchange was built in brick and terracotta. It became Woolworths and an extra storey was added in 1920. In 1909 Marks and Spencer opened its first store at number 76. The present store at number 47 was begun in 1939 and completed postwar in 1951.

In 1910, Dyson's Jewellers added a clock with a ball that dropped down at precisely 1 p.m. and became the landmark known as the Time Ball buildings. In the 1930s the Headrow became Leeds' main thoroughfare, which led to a decline in the fortunes of business in Briggate. Debenhams department store arrived in 1936 on the corner with Kirkgate with an unusual zigzag pattern of windows. Developments often required the demolition of old buildings, including the Empire Theatre in the 1960s, to make a very plain arcade. The 1980s saw the refurbishment of old buildings and the creation of the Victoria Quarter, three blocks between Briggate and Vicar Lane, comprising County Arcade, Cross Arcade, Queen Victoria Street and King Edward Street was created in September 1990.

In the 1990s the arcade on the site of the Empire Theatre was demolished and a glazed frontage to link the older buildings on either side of it were refurbished to create a Harvey Nichols store in 1997. Briggate was pedestrianised and closed to private vehicles in 1993, and in 1999 was paved with York stone and granite setts. Lower Briggate and New Briggate remain open to traffic.

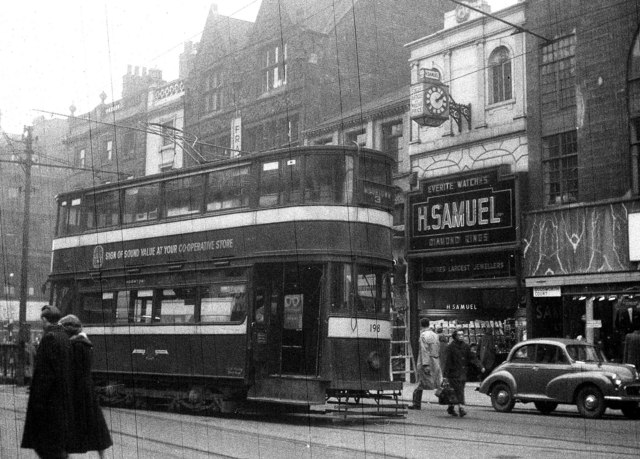
A tram on Briggate, 1958

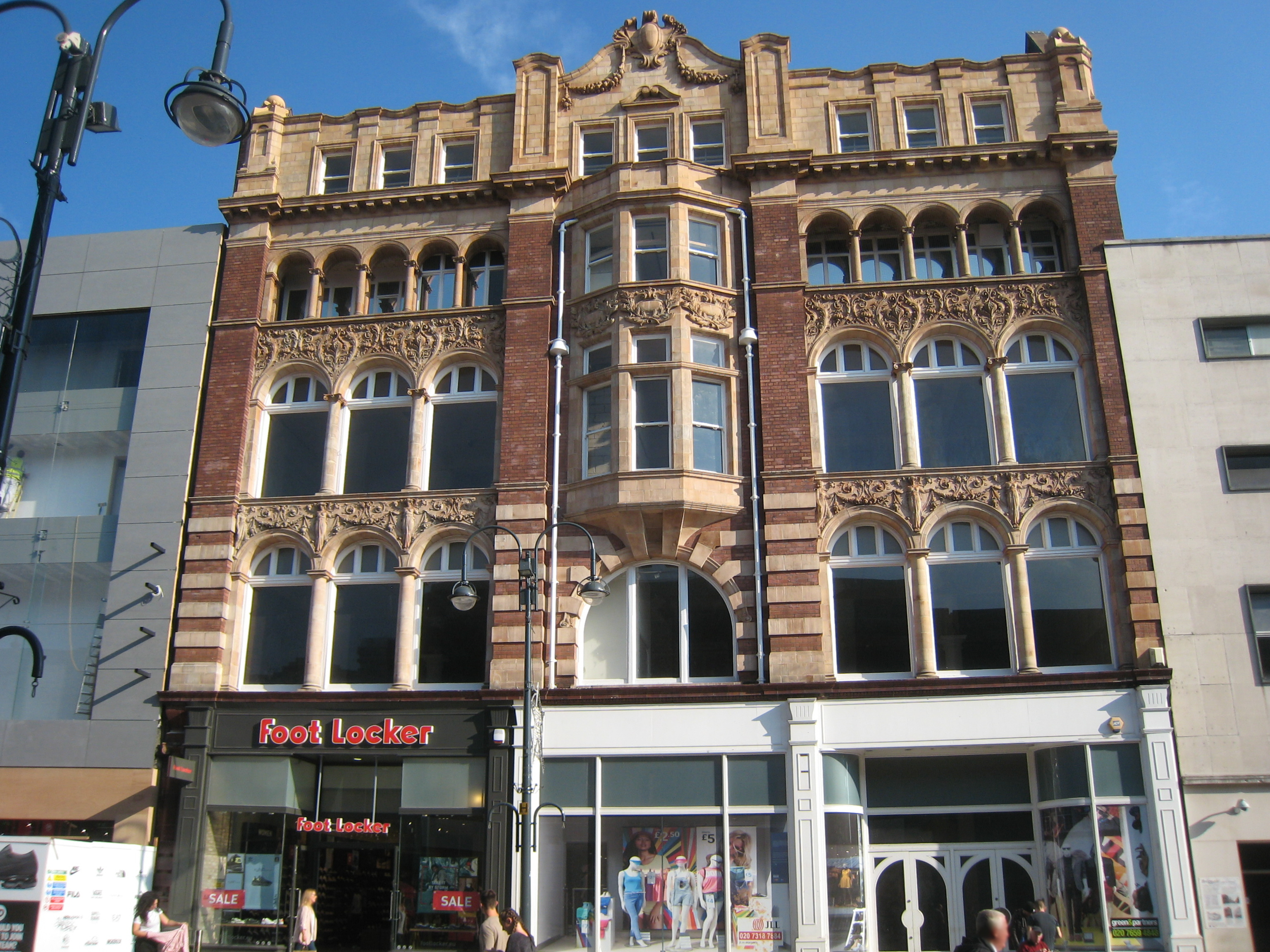
Former 1907 post office exchange

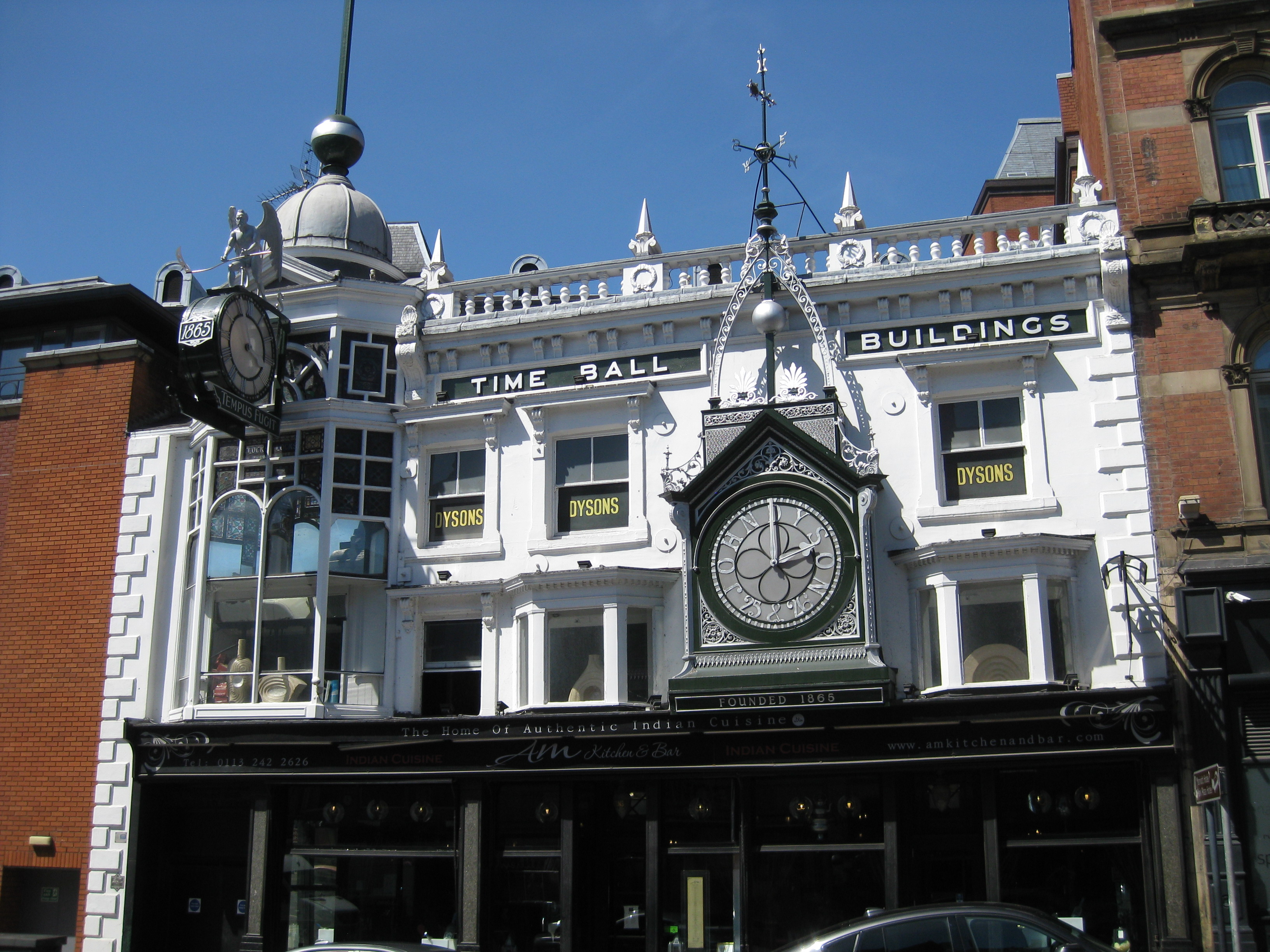
Time Ball buildings, Lower Briggate

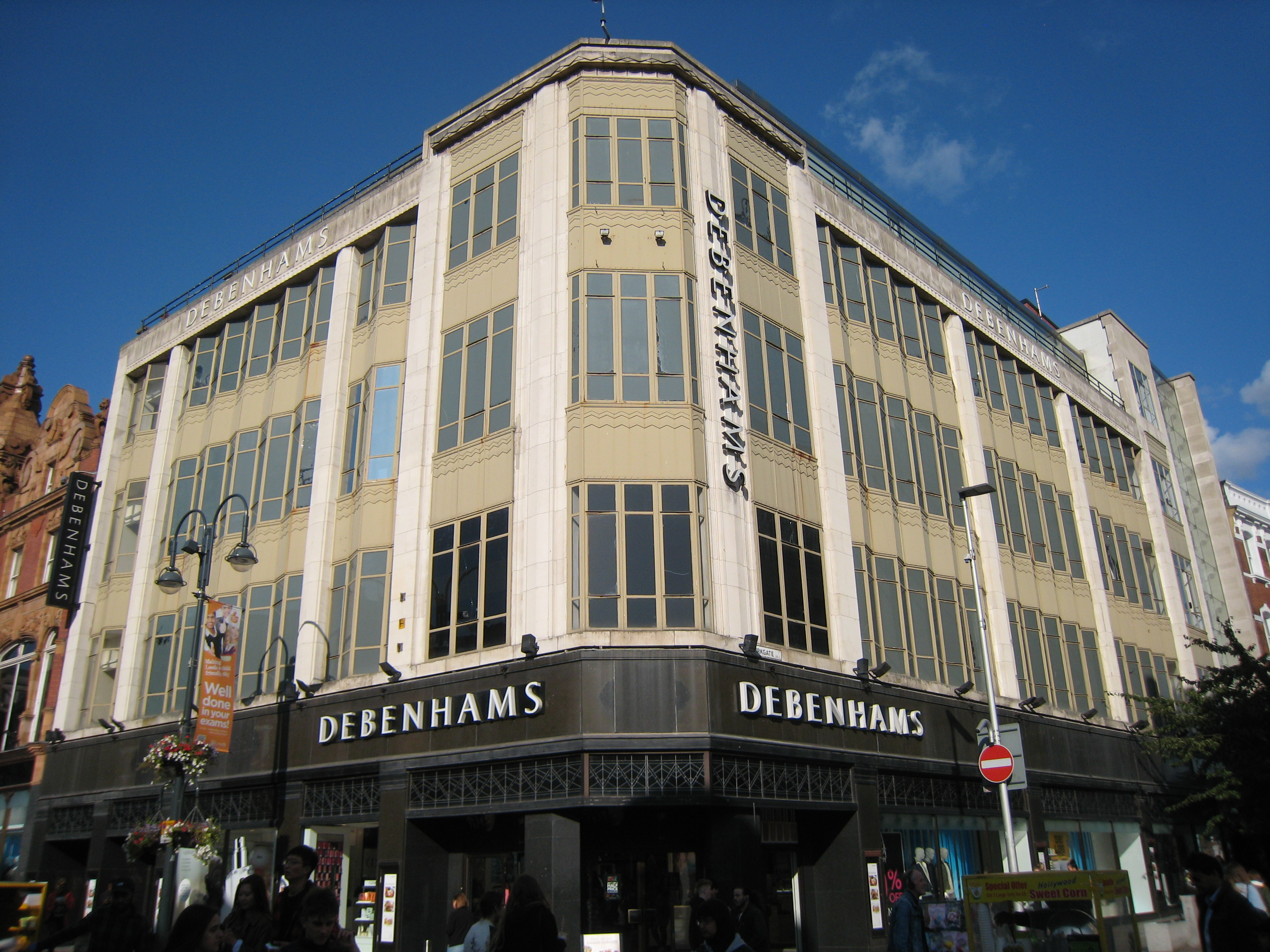
Debenhams, with Kirkate to the right

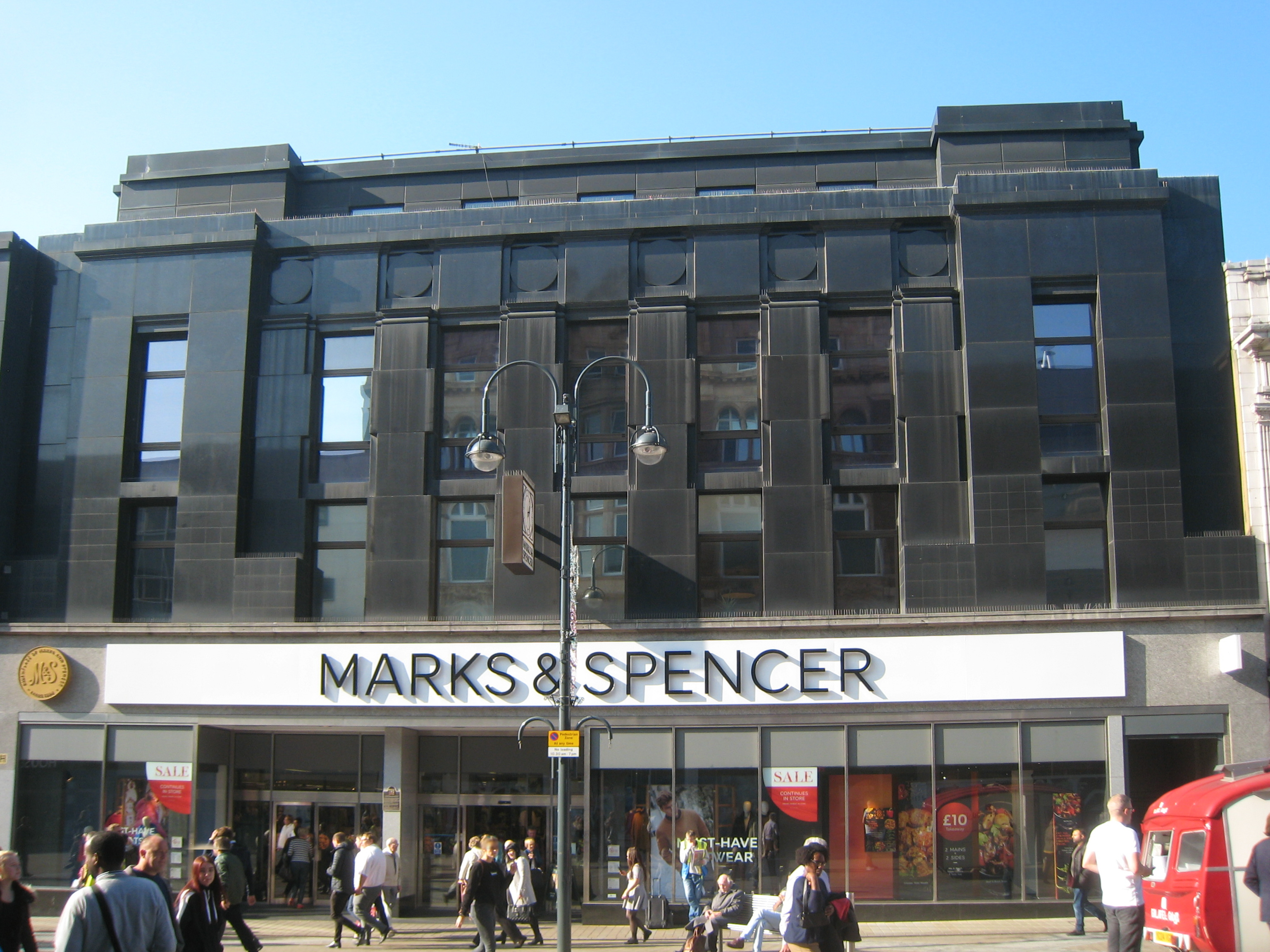
Marks and Spencer 1951 building

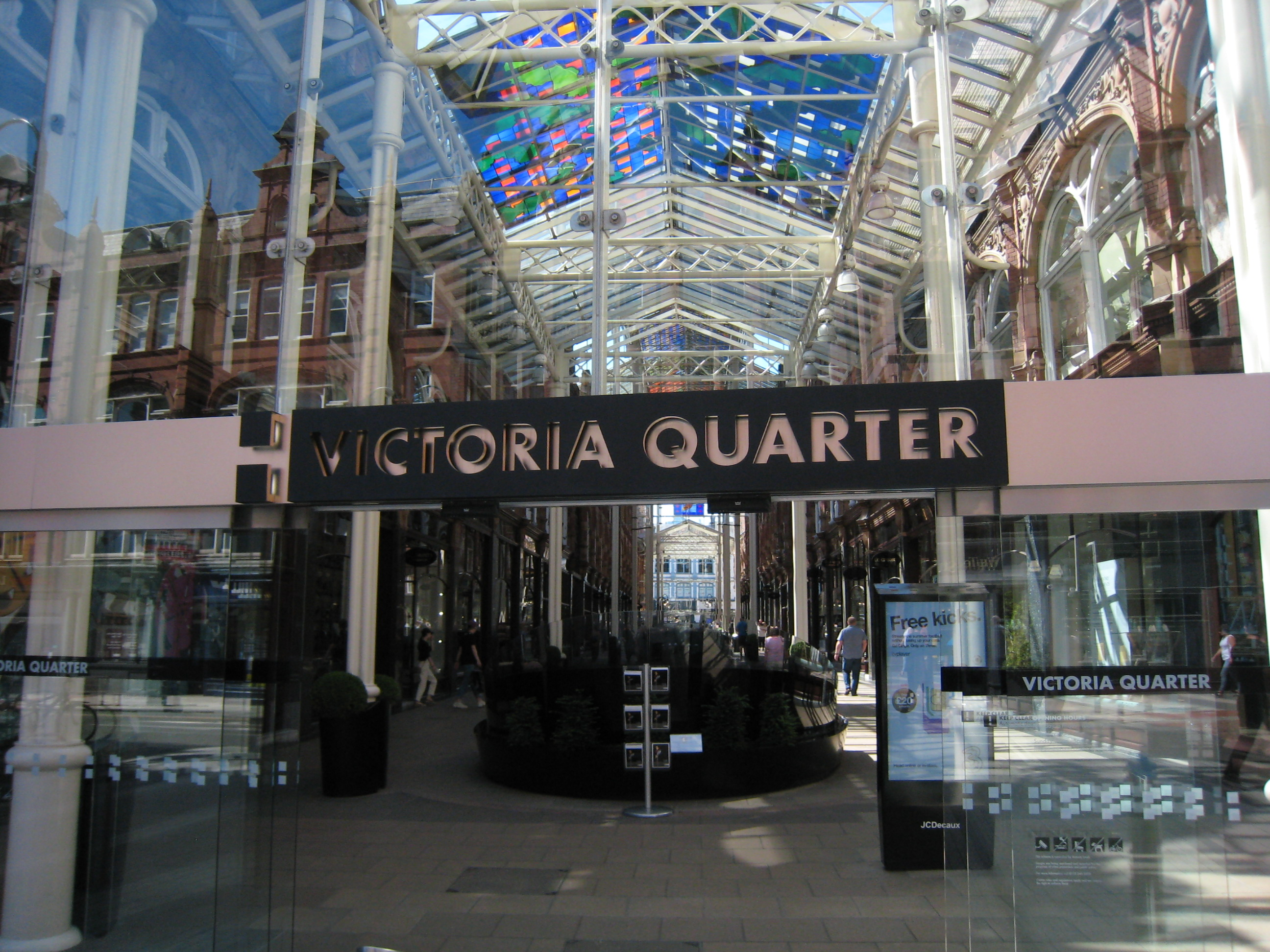
Victoria Quarter entrance

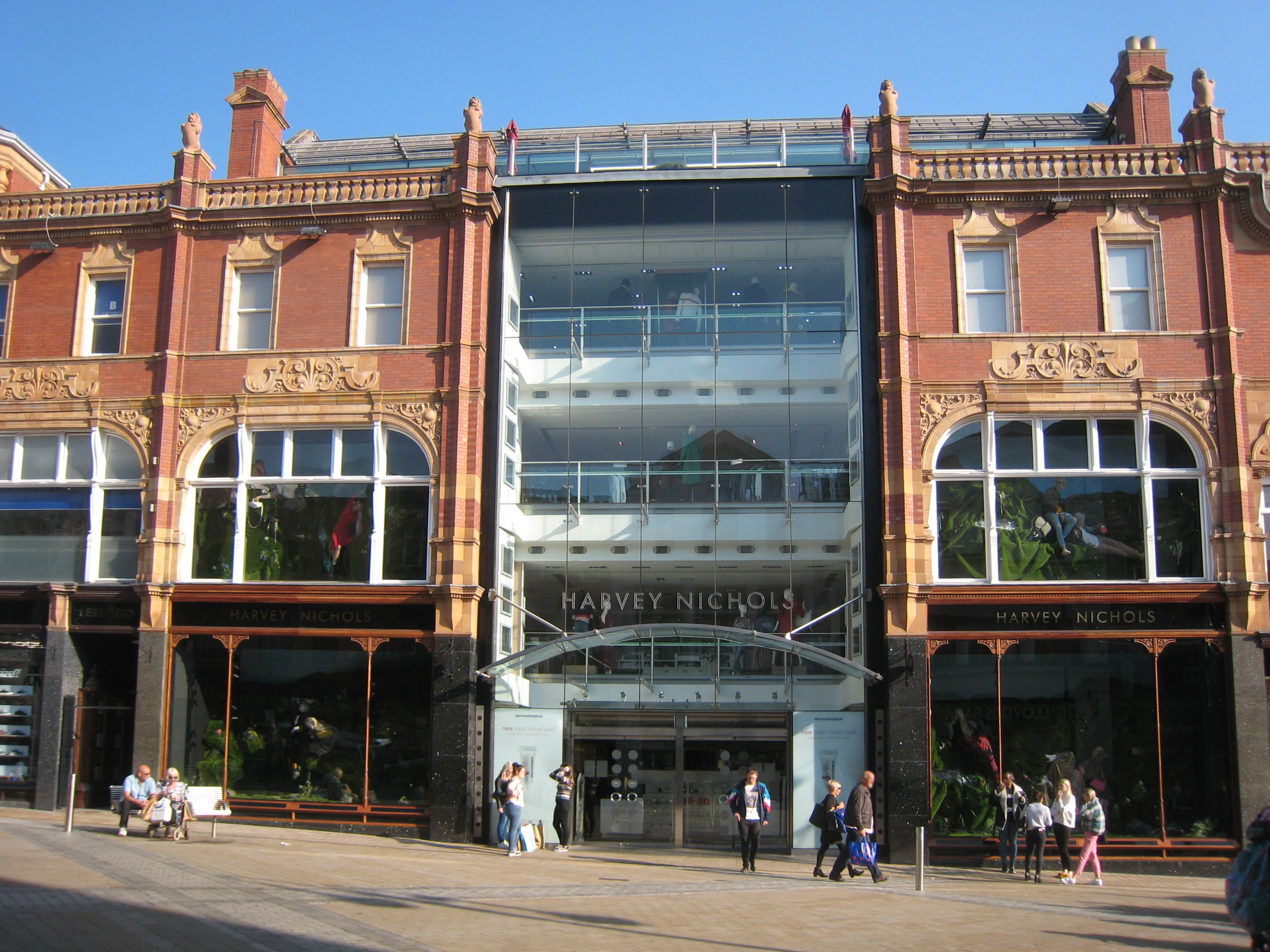
Harvey Nichols, main entrance

Briggate Minerva, a contemporary statue

=== 21st century ===
Briggate in July 2026

The paving was extensively refurbished in 2007 for Leeds' 800th anniversary celebrations. In 2008 the 1970s-built Burton's Arcade at the southern end of Briggate was demolished to make way for the Trinity Quarter that opened in March 2013. At the same time the Market Street Arcade at the southern end of Briggate closed for redevelopment. It was given an extra level, glass roof and new tenants and reopened in 2012 as the Central Arcade.

== Arcades ==
Leeds is noted for the arcades on either side of Briggate. Modern arcades were built in the 1970s at the southern end, but the arcades of architectural significance are at its northern end.

- Grand Arcade on New Briggate was built by the New Briggate Arcade Company Ltd in 1897, with Smith & Tweedal as architects. It originally consisted of two parallel arcades running between Vicar Lane and New Briggate, with a cross passage onto Merrion Street. It contains a clock by William Potts and Son with a British Empire theme of characters which move around while two knights strike bells according to the hours.
- Thornton's Arcade was the first in Leeds. Designed by Charles Fowler, a Leeds architect, was completed in May 1878. There is a clock by William Potts and Son underneath which is a bell struck by four life-sized, wooden, Jacquemart figures from the novel Ivanhoe of Richard I, Friar Tuck, Robin Hood and the swineherd Gurth built by John Wormald Appleyard.
- Queen's Arcade, named after the reigning monarch was opened in 1889, built on the site of the Rose and Crown Yard, and originally include the Queen's Hotel in the upper storey. The Briggate entrance was enlarged in 1895, and it was refurbished in 1994. It has an upper shopping gallery with ornate cast-iron balconies, though this is no longer accessible.
- County Arcade, designed by architect Frank Matcham, was completed in 1903 and is particularly grand when compared to the other arcades. Its marble floors, intricate stonework and elegant iron domes make up part of the Victoria Quarter complex.
- Queen Victoria Street has been arcaded since 1990. The largest expanse of stained glass in Europe, designed by Brian Clarke, makes up its impressive canopy. It is part of the Victoria Quarter and linked to County Arcade by Cross Arcade, which is of the same design as County Arcade.
- Central Arcade opened in 2012 on the former Market Street Arcade site. This is the only arcade to have shops on the first floor.
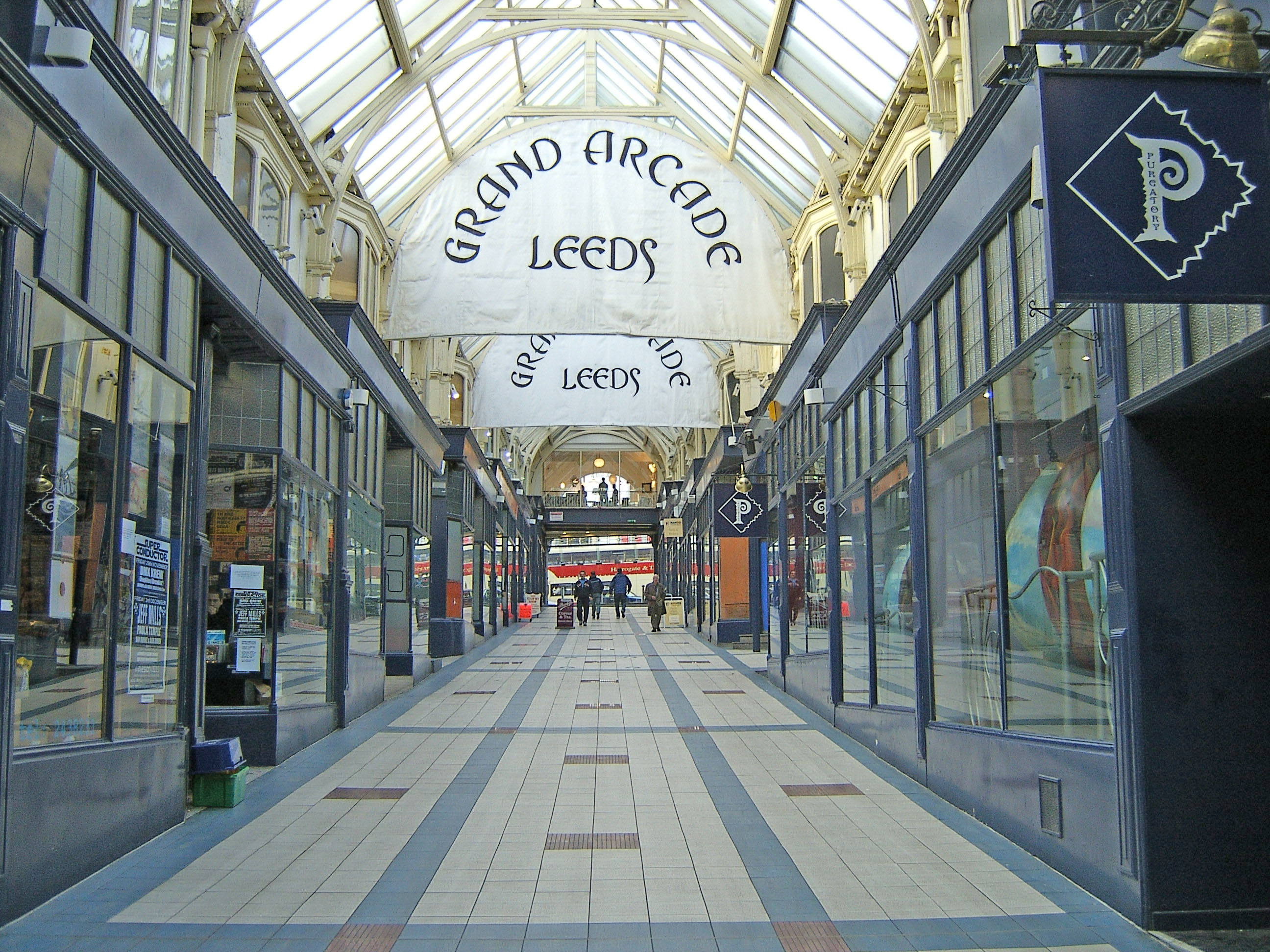
Grand Arcade

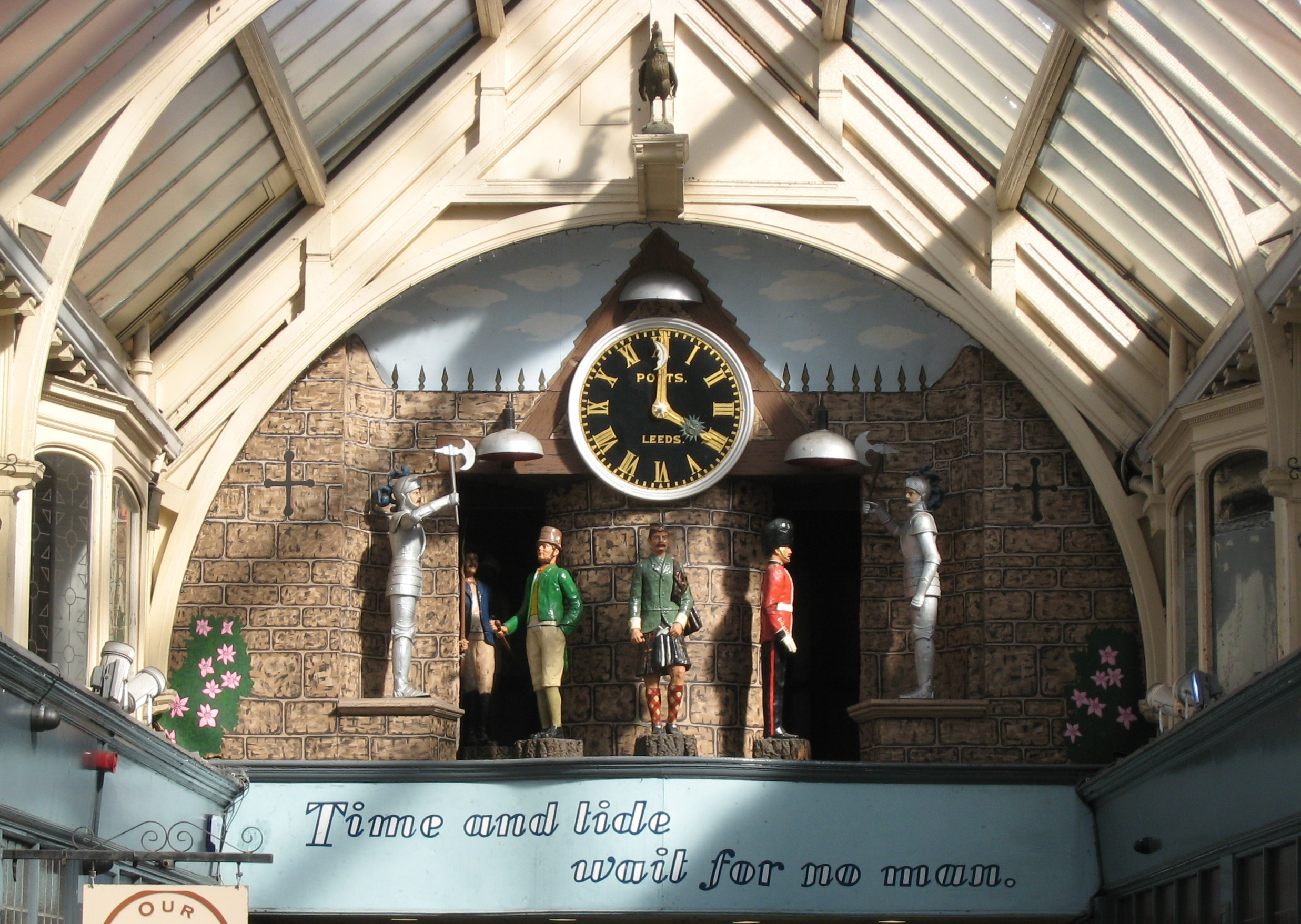
Grand Arcade Clock. Figures from right to left, represent England, Scotland, Ireland, and Wales.

Thornton's Arcade entrance

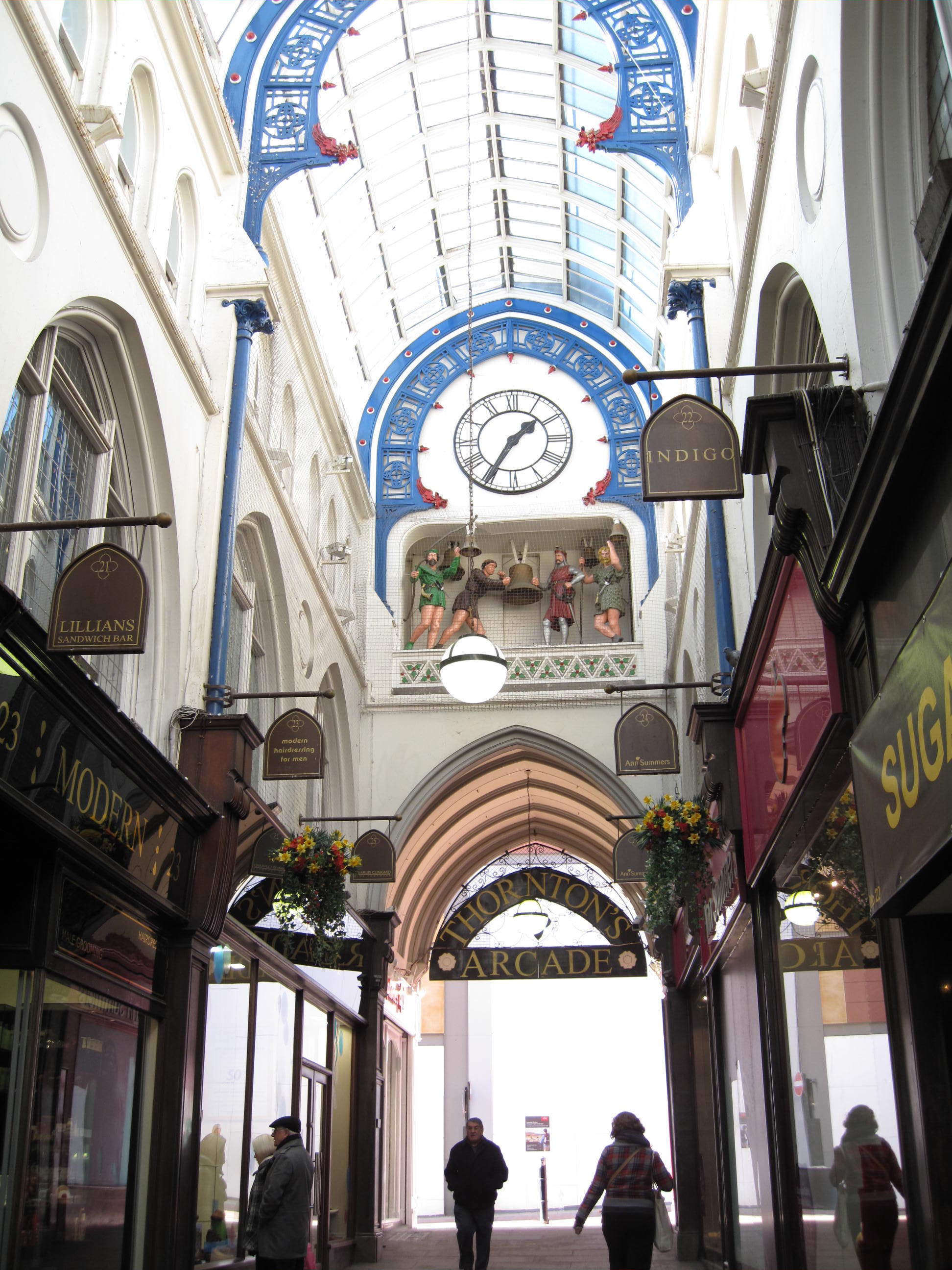
Thornton's Arcade showing the clock

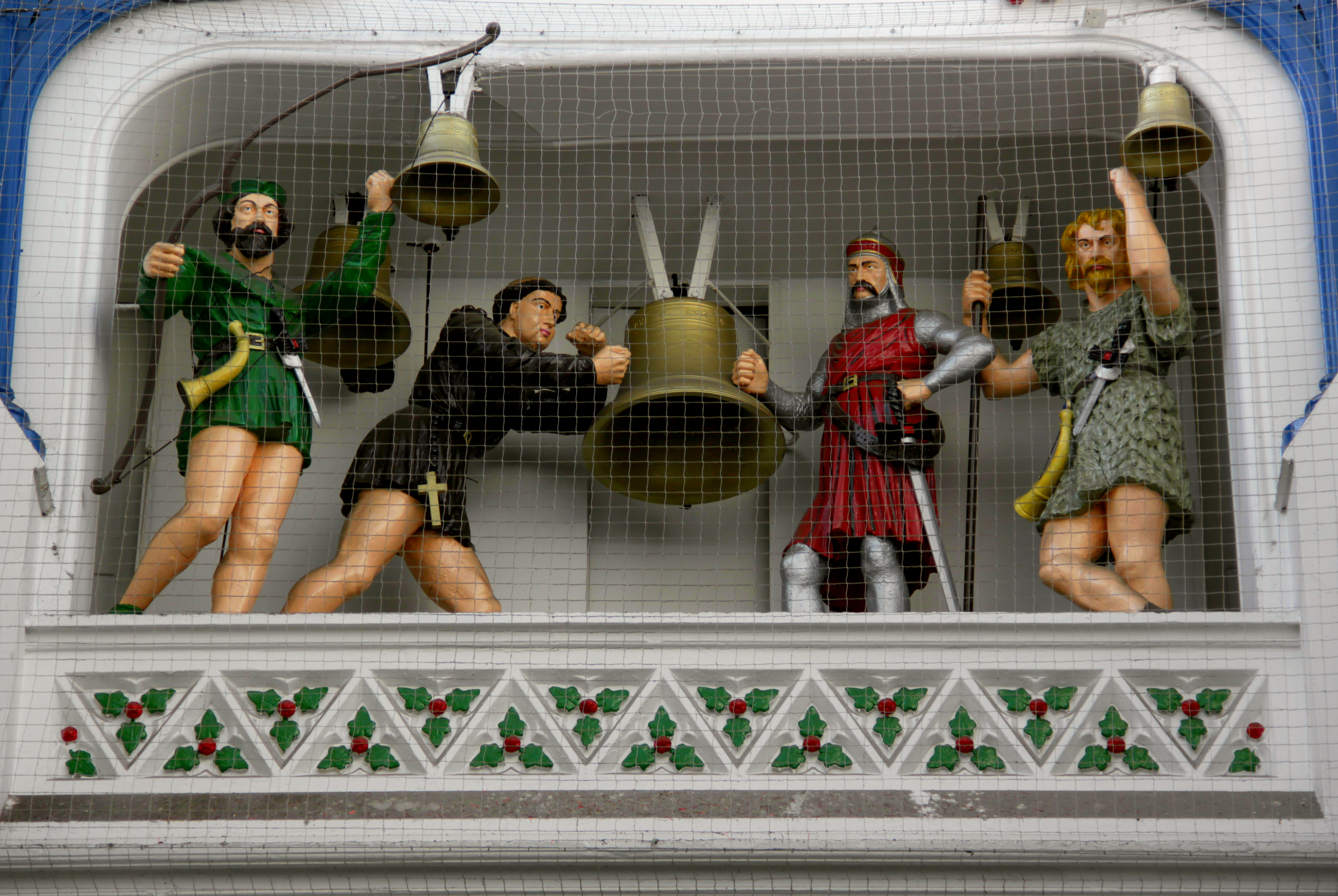
Thornton's Ivanhoe clock figures

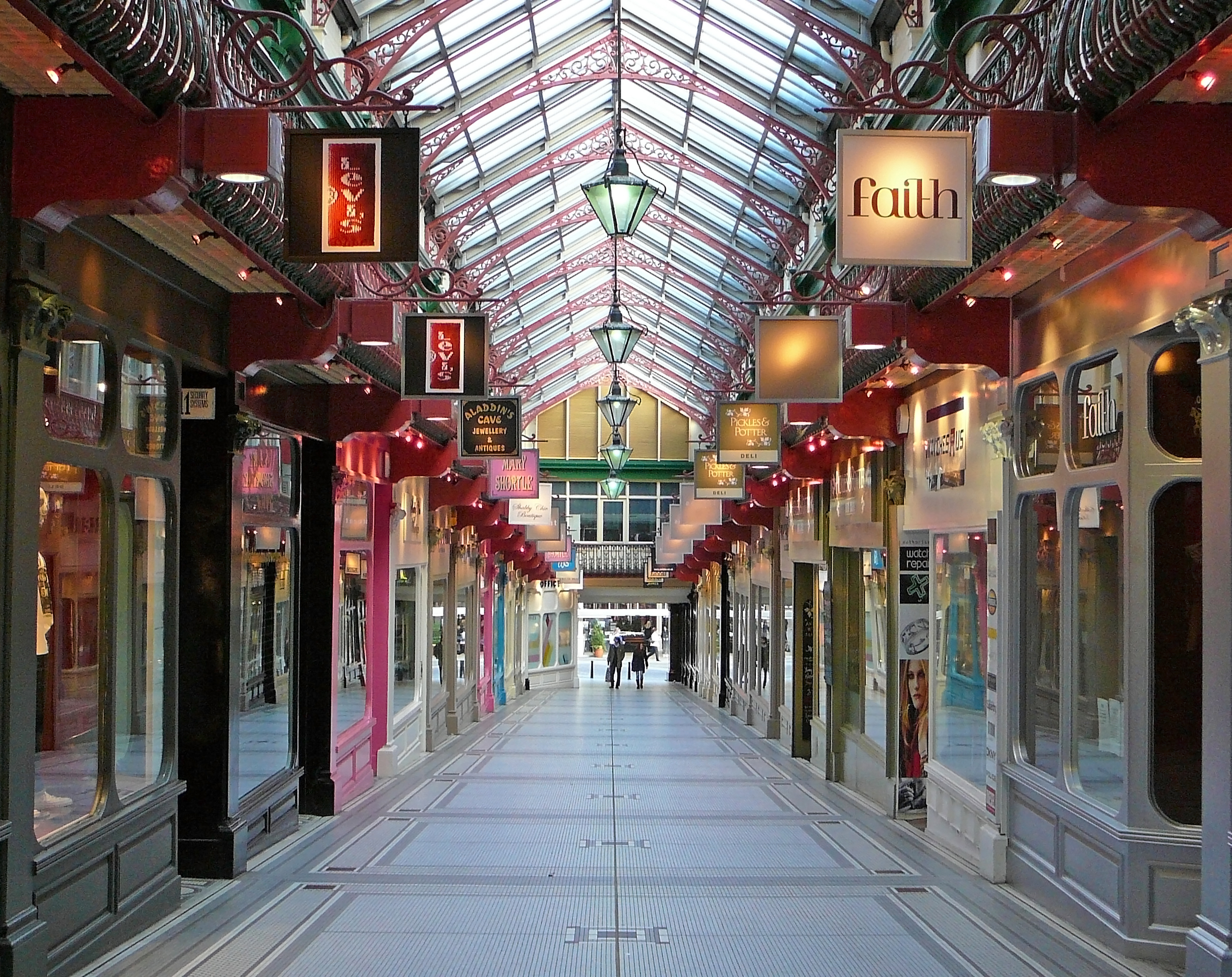
Queens Arcade

County Arcade entrance

County Arcade

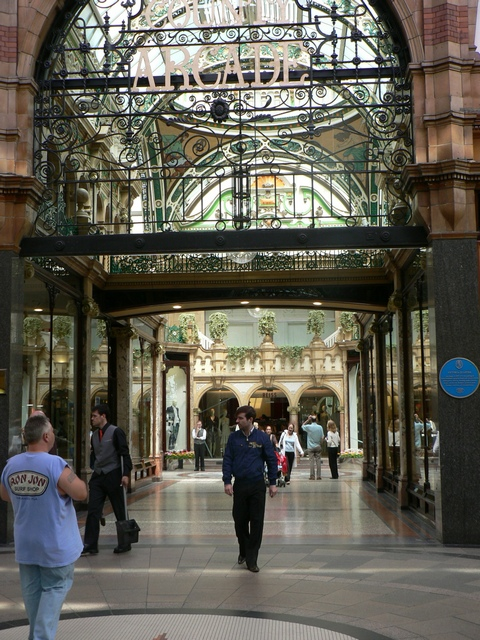
Cross Arcade

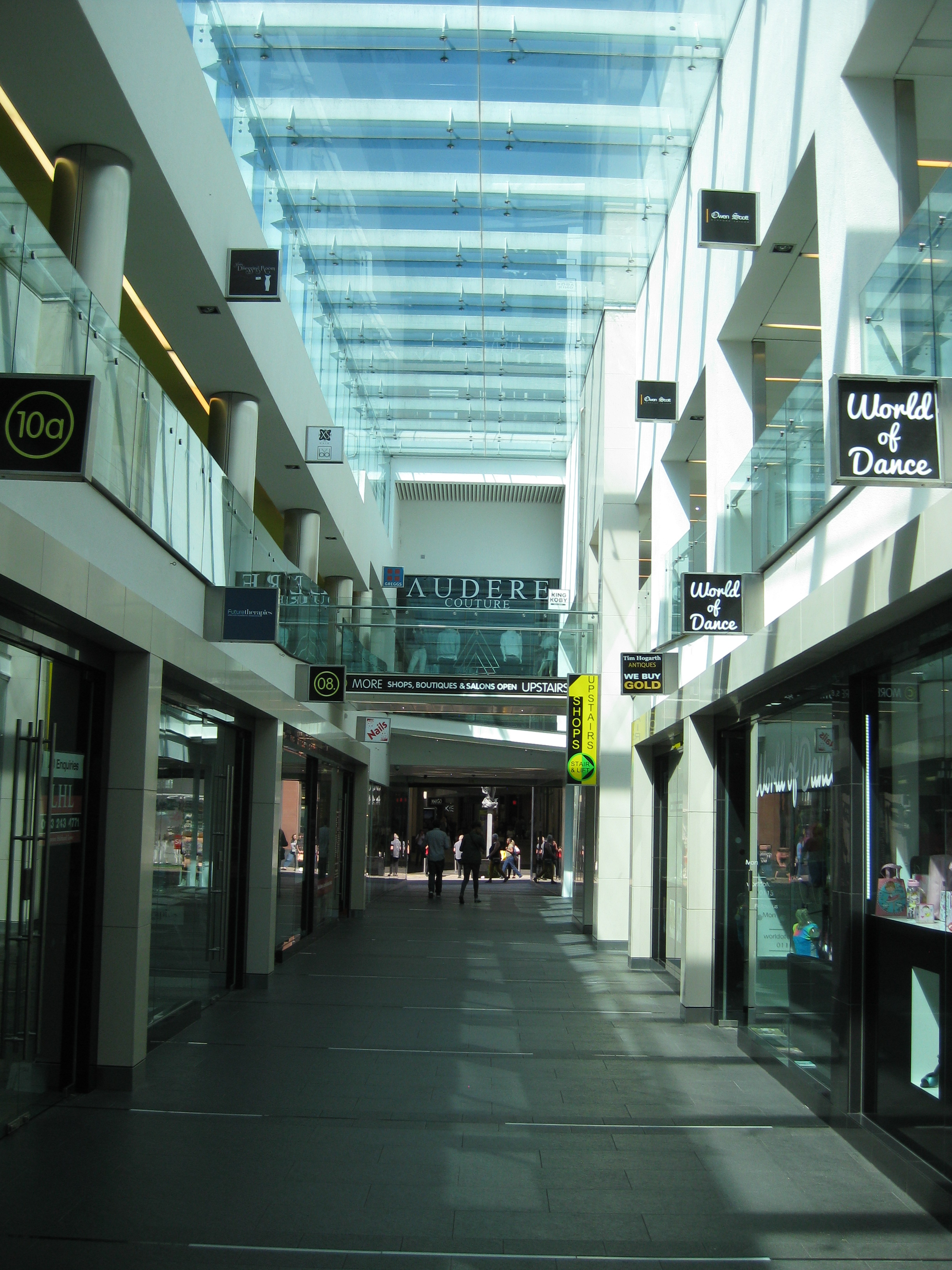
Central Arcade

== Theatres ==
- Leeds Grand Theatre on New Briggate was redeveloped from 2004 to provide an enlarged home for Opera North and regenerate the area.
- Leeds City Varieties on Swan Street is one of the UK's oldest music halls. The City Varieties was granted Heritage Lottery funding for refurbishment and restoration, and closed in January 2009 and re-opened in September 2011.
- Frank Matcham's Empire Theatre on Briggate was demolished in the 1960s, its site is occupied by Harvey Nichols.

== Yards ==
A feature of Briggate is its yards: more open areas behind the buildings on the street, accessed by a narrow alley or through a covered way. These are based on the old burgage plots and are thus mostly long and narrow, as the working places between buildings. Several have or had inns within them.

- Angel Inn Yard has the large 18th-century Angel Inn in a well-preserved Georgian square. It is where Joseph Aspdin first sold Portland cement.
- Blayd's Yard close to Leeds Bridge has Georgian warehouses and cottages. A Leeds Civic Trust blue plaque, commemorates notable printers.
- Hirst's Yard is an alley between Call Lane and Lower Briggate. It contains a well-preserved early 19th-century warehouse and the Neo-Tudor Whip Inn, which was men-only until the 1980s, the last drinking house to do so.
- Lambert's Yard is a small square from a narrow alley on Lower Briggate, which contains the city's oldest building, part of a once larger 17th-century oak-framed building with projecting upper storeys.
- Pack Horse Yard was formerly the property of the Knights Templar and contains a cross from their old building. It contains the Pack Horse Inn as well as a Civic Trust blue plaque commemorating Joseph Aspdin, the inventor of Portland cement.
- Queen's Court is a yard behind a fine Queen Anne cloth merchant's house, entered through a central archway, with 18th- and 19th-century buildings.
- Ship Inn Yard is between the inn and Queen's Arcade, and preserves by its size and location of one of the original burgage plots.
- Turk's Head Yard contains cottages for the working classes built in 1790 that were converted in 1880 to Whitelock's Ale House, a richly decorated Victorian pub with marble counters, engraved mirrors, faience and brasswork.

The back entrances to the yards were called 'low ins', or 'loins', which is where the term Loiner (a resident of Leeds) is suspected to originate. Loiner refers to the people who would 'hang around in the loins.

== Bibliography ==
- Brears, Peter; Grady, Kevin (2007). Briggate Yards and Arcades. Leeds Civic Trust. ISBN 9780905671253.
- Wrathmell, Susan (2005). Leeds. Yale University Press. ISBN 0-300-10736-6.
