= Grand Arcade =

Grand Arcade may refer to one of several shopping centres:

- Grand Arcade (Barnet)
- Grand Arcade (Cambridge)
- Grand Arcade (Leeds)
- Grand Arcade (Wigan)
