= 1921–22 Yorkshire Cup =

- Structure: Regional knockout championship
- Teams: 14
- Winners: Leeds
- Runners-up: Dewsbury

The 1921–22 Yorkshire Cup was the fourteenth occasion on which the Yorkshire Cup competition had been held. This year saw another new name on the trophy when Leeds won the cup by beating Dewsbury by the score of 11–3 in the final. The match was played at Thrum Hall, Halifax, now in West Yorkshire. The attendance was 20,000 and receipts were £1,650. This was the first of Leeds' Yorkshire Cup successes, and they would go on to (eventually) triumph on a record seventeen occasions.

== Background ==
The Rugby Football League's Yorkshire Cup competition was a knock-out competition between (mainly professional) rugby league clubs from the county of Yorkshire. The actual area was at times increased to encompass other teams from outside the county such as Newcastle, Mansfield, Coventry, and even London (in the form of Acton & Willesden. The Rugby League season always (until the onset of "Summer Rugby" in 1996) ran from around August-time through to around May-time and this competition always took place early in the season, in the Autumn, with the final taking place in (or just before) December (The only exception to this was when disruption of the fixture list was caused during, and immediately after, the two World Wars).

== Competition and results ==
This season there were no junior/amateur clubs taking part, no "leavers" but Featherstone Rovers joined for the first time as a league team, after being newly admitted to the league during the close-season. This resulted in one additional entrant, bringing the total up to fourteen. This in turn resulted in only two byes in the first round.

=== Round 1 ===
Involved 6 matches (with two byes) and 14 clubs

Game No	Fixture date	Home team	Score	Away team	Venue	Ref
1	Sat 15 Oct 1921	Batley	5–4	Hunslet	Mount Pleasant	
2	Sat 15 Oct 1921	Bradford Northern	2–14	Bramley	Birch Lane	
3	Sat 15 Oct 1921	Dewsbury	3–0	Hull	Crown Flatt	
4	Sat 15 Oct 1921	Hull Kingston Rovers	16–7	Keighley	Craven Street (off Holderness Road)	
5	Sat 15 Oct 1921	Leeds	11–2	Huddersfield	Headingley	
6	Sat 15 Oct 1921	York	3–4	Wakefield Trinity	Clarence Street	
7		Halifax		bye		
8		Featherstone Rovers		bye		

=== Round 2 – quarterfinals ===
Involved 4 matches and 8 clubs

Game No	Fixture date	Home team	Score	Away team	Venue	Ref
1	Sat 29 Oct 1921	Batley	5–5	Bramley	Mount Pleasant	
2	Sat 29 Oct 1921	Dewsbury	15–2	Wakefield Trinity	Crown Flatt	
3	Sat 29 Oct 1921	Featherstone Rovers (Note: Featherstone Rovers played their first Yorkshire Cup match since being elected to the league, and at Post Office Road)	0–12	Hull Kingston Rovers	Post Office Road	
4	Sat 29 Oct 1921	Leeds	20–2	Halifax	Headingley	

=== Round 2 - replays ===
Involved 1 match and 2 clubs

Game No	Fixture date	Home team	Score	Away team	Venue	Ref
R	Wed 2 Nov 1921	Bramley	6–0	Batley	Barley Mow	

=== Round 3 – semifinals ===
Involved 2 matches and 4 clubs

Game No	Fixture date	Home team	Score	Away team	Venue	Ref
1	Sat 12 Nov 1921	Bramley	4–11	Leeds	Barley Mow	
2	Sat 12 Nov 1921	Dewsbury	8–3	Hull Kingston Rovers	Crown Flatt	

=== Final ===
Game No	Fixture date	Home team	Score	Away team	Venue	Att	Rec	Ref
	Saturday 26 November 1921	Leeds	11–3	Dewsbury	Thrum Hall (Note: Thrum Hall was the home ground of Halifax with a final capacity of 9,832 (The attendance record of 29,153 was set on 21 March 1959 for a third round Challenge Cup tie v Wigan). The club finally moved out in 1998 to take part ownership and ground-share with Halifax Town A.F.C. at The Shay Stadium.)	20000 (Note: The attendance is given as 22,001 by RUGBY LEAGUE project but only 20,000 by the Rothmans Rugby League Yearbook of 1991-92 and 1990-91)	1650	

==== Teams and scorers ====
Leeds	№	Dewsbury
	teams	
John Roberts	1	William Seddon
Syd Walmsley	2	Percy Bates
William Avon Davies	3	Evan Rees
Jim Bacon	4	Eddie Catterall
William Hugh Davies	5	Joe Lyman
Joe Brittain	6	Albert Jenkinson
Archie Brown	7	Ernest Rodgers
Bernard Gould	8	Thomas Craven
John Hardaker	9	Albert Dixon
Bernard Gould	10	Frank Gallagher
Robert Boagey	11	George Sharples
William Pearson	12	Robert Birch
Billy Ward	13	John Leake
??	Coach	??
11	score	3
8	HT	3
	Scorers	
	Tries	
Jim Bacon (2)	T	1
Syd Walmsley (1)	T	
	Goals	
1	G	
	Drop Goals	
	DG	
Referee		unknown

Scoring - Try = three (3) points - Goal = two (2) points - Drop goal = two (2) points

=== The road to success ===
First round
Batley	5
Hunslet	4
Bradford Northern	2
Bramley	14
Leeds	11
Huddersfield	2
Halifax
bye
Dewsbury	3
Hull	0
York	3
Wakefield Trinity	4
Featherstone Rovers
bye
Hull Kingston Rovers	19
Keighley	7

Second round
Batley	5 (0)
Bramley	5 (6)
Leeds	20
Halifax	2
Dewsbury	15
Wakefield Trinity	2
Featherstone Rovers	0
Hull Kingston Rovers	12

Semifinals
Bramley	4
Leeds	11
Dewsbury	8
Hull Kingston Rovers	3

Final
Leeds	11
Dewsbury	3

== See also ==
- 1921–22 Northern Rugby Football Union season
- Rugby league county cups
