= Albert Jenkinson =

GB & England international rugby league footballer

Personal information
- Full name: Albert Jenkinson
- Born: First ¼ 1884 Hunslet district, England
- Died: unknown

Playing information
- Position: Wing
Club
| Years | Team | Pld | T | G | FG | P |
|---|---|---|---|---|---|---|
| 1908–14 | Hunslet | 150 | 78 | 3 | 0 | 240 |
| 1914–20 | Leeds | 63 | 26 | 0 | 0 | 78 |
| | Dewsbury |
| | Total | 213 | 104 | 3 | 0 | 318 |
Representative
| Years | Team | Pld | T | G | FG | P |
| 1910–12 | Yorkshire | 6 | 6 | 0 | 0 | 18 |
| 1911–12 | Great Britain | 2 | 0 | 0 | 0 | 0 |
| 1911–13 | England | 3 | 3 | 0 | 0 | 9 |

Albert Jenkinson (first ¼ 1884 – death unknown) was an English professional rugby league footballer who played in the 1910s. He played at representative level for Great Britain, and England, and at club level for Hunslet, as a wing.

== Club career ==
Jenkinson started his career with Hunslet F.C. before joining Leeds in May 1914.

Jenkinson joined Dewsbury during the 1919–20 season. He played for the club in the 1921–22 Yorkshire Cup final, but suffered a broken leg during the game.

== Representative honours ==
Jenkinson won caps for England while at Hunslet in 1911 against Australia, in 1912 against Wales, in 1913 against Wales, and won caps for Great Britain while at Hunslet in 1911–12 against Australia (2 matches).

Jenkinson also represented Yorkshire, notably scoring three tries in a 13–16 defeat against Cumberland on 9 December 1911.
