= Victoria Leeds =

Retail development in Leeds, West Yorkshire, England

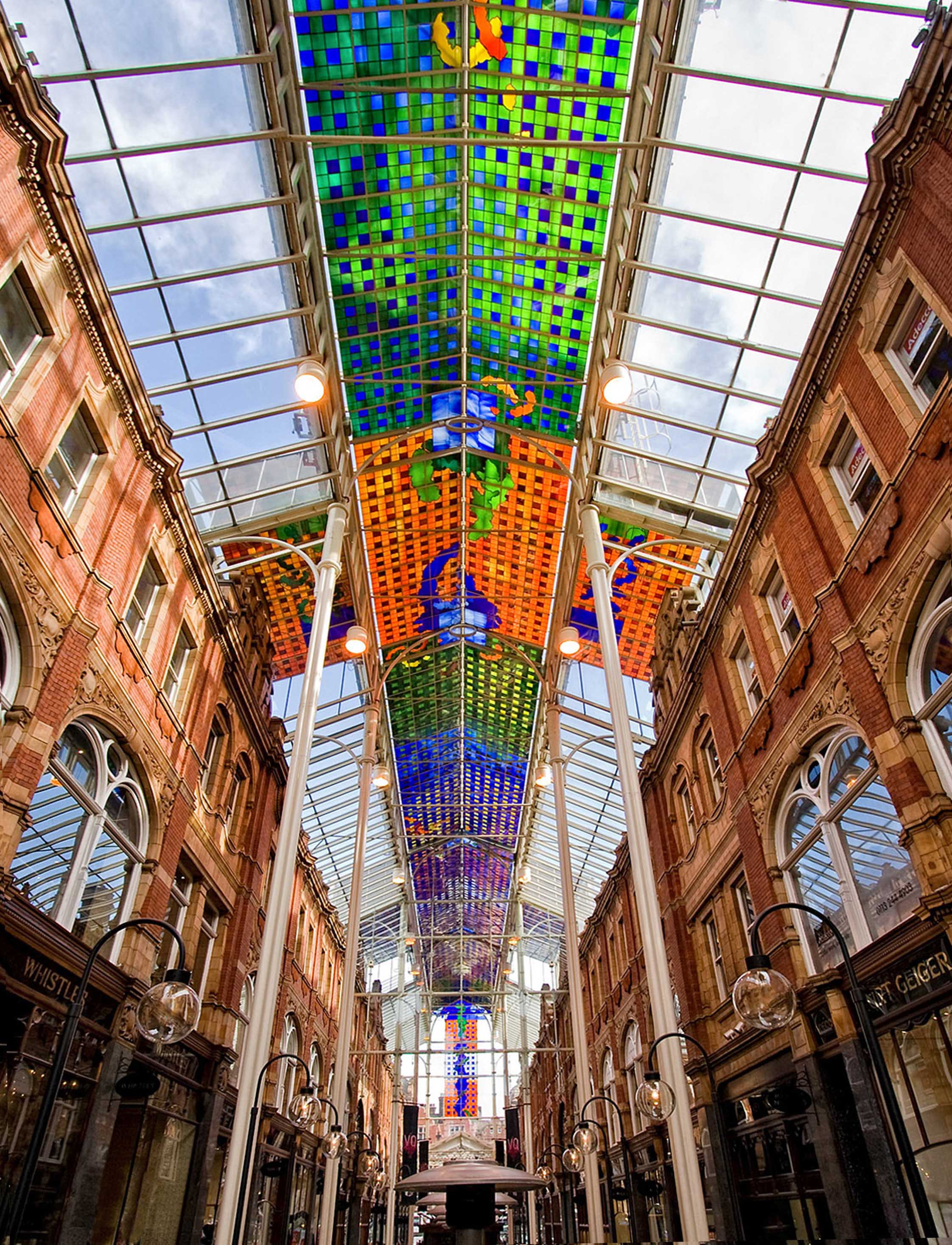
- Contemporary arcade of the Victoria Quarter, Leeds, and canopy of stained glass by Sir Brian Clarke
- Location: Leeds city centre, Leeds, England
- Coordinates: 53°47′53″N 1°32′17″W
- Developer: Hammerson
- Owner: Redical Holdings
- Num. of stores: 80
- Num. of anchor tenants: 3
- Floor area: 1,100,000 ft^{2} (102,193 m^{2})
- Floors: 3
- Parking: 800 spaces
- Website: www.victorialeeds.co.uk

Victoria Leeds is a shopping district and leisure area in central Leeds, comprising the 1990 Victoria Quarter, an arcaded complex of restored 19th-century and contemporary shopping arcades, and the 2016 Victoria Gate development. Notable for its role in the regeneration of Leeds' city centre, and a programme of restoration and reuse which included commissioning the largest work of stained glass work in Europe, designed by artist Brian Clarke, to cover the newly pedestrianised Queen Victoria Street, the 1990 scheme created a covered retail district of linked arcades. In 2016, the Victoria Quarter was merged with the newly built Victoria Gate complex to form the largest premium retail and leisure venue in Northern England. The district includes a casino and major stores such as Harvey Nichols (converting into Flannels) and John Lewis and Partners.

== Victoria Quarter ==
The Grade II* listed Victoria Quarter is a network of interconnected, covered shopping spaces, forming an upmarket shopping district popularly known as 'the Knightsbridge of the North'. Created in a major redevelopment programme through the restoration of the existing Victorian and Edwardian arcades, and the creation of a contemporary arcade through the pedestrianisation and glazing over of the adjacent Queen Victoria Street with what was at the time the largest work of public art in England, and the largest secular stained glass work in the world, designed by artist Brian Clarke. Covering three blocks between Briggate and Vicar Lane, comprising County Arcade, Cross Arcade, Queen Victoria Street and King Edward Street, the Derek Latham & Company redevelopment opened as the Victoria Quarter in September 1990. The project is widely cited as an exemplar of successful and contextual urban regeneration, and in 1991 the full scheme was awarded both the Leeds Award for Architecture (with the stained glass canopy receiving an award individually, in addition) and the Civic Trust Award; in 2013 Victoria Quarter received another Leeds Architecture Award, for its contribution to the city's redevelopment.

County Arcade, Victoria Quarter

=== Early history ===
County Arcade and Cross Arcade were built by the Leeds Estate Company, who commissioned theatre architect Frank Matcham to design them as part of the company's redevelopment of the east side of Briggate and west side of Vicar Lane, which the City Engineer had recommended, to Leeds City Council in 1896, be widened. Matcham's newly constructed Empire Theatre, around which the arcades were built, was intended to form the focal point of a civic complex modelled on the Galleria in Milan. The "largest and most elaborate, and the latest constructed, of Leeds' 19th-century and fin de siècle arcades, with construction begun in 1898 and completed in 1904, they were notable for their glazed barrel roofing decorated with copious amounts of faïence from the local Burmantofts Pottery, a number of mosaics and plentiful use of marble. Matcham's development included the Empire Theatre and all three constructions were in the same style: three storeys decorated in a 'free baroque style' with pink and buff terracotta. In 1961, the Empire Theatre was demolished to make way for another arcade in contemporary style.

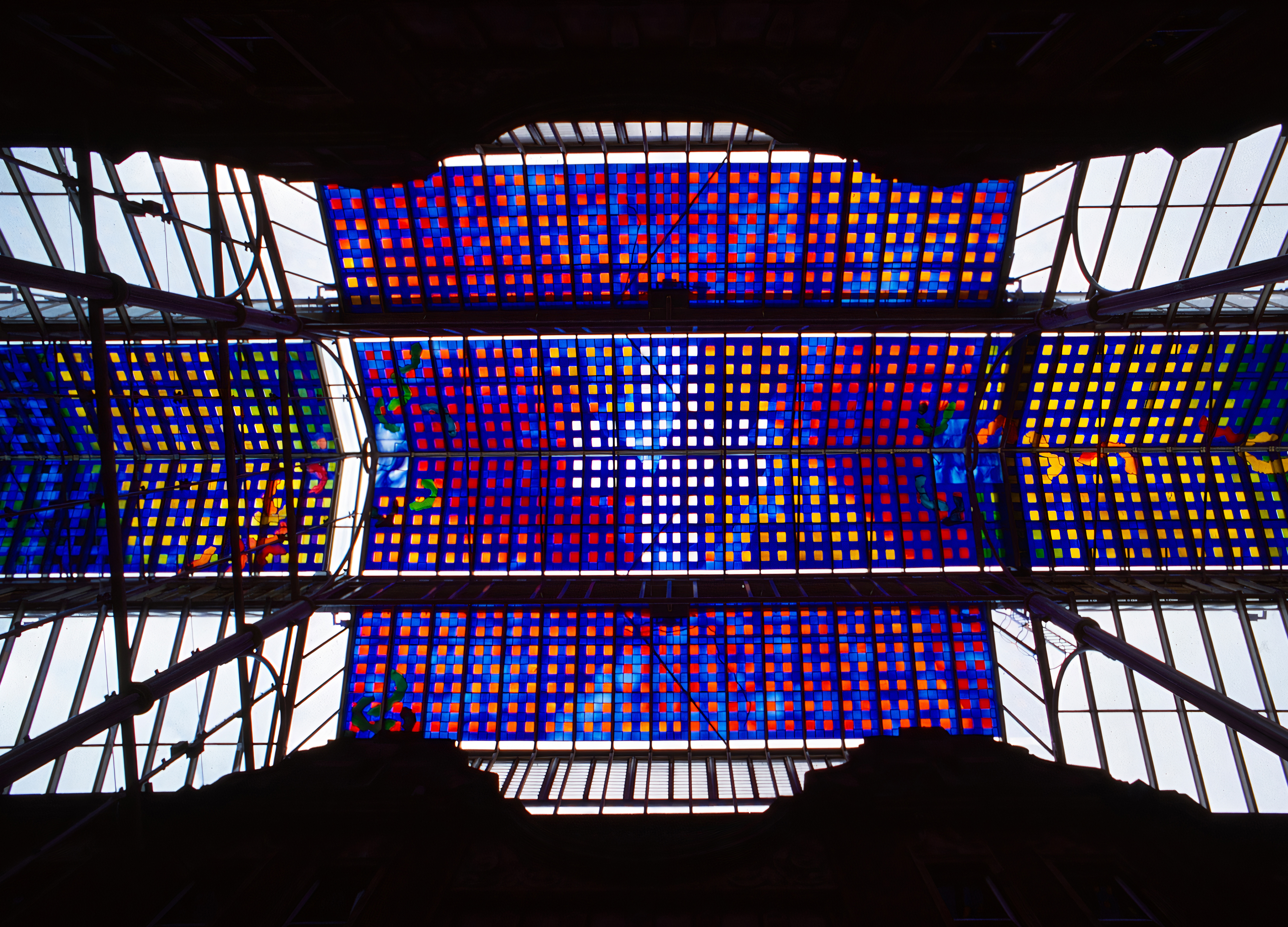
The junction of Queen Victoria Street and Cross Arcade, marked by a cross in the stained glass canopy

=== Redevelopment ===
Having become dilapidated, the County and Cross Arcades were restored by Derek Latham & Co in phases between 1989 and 1996, and Queen Victoria Street was glazed over in its entirety with a stained glass canopy by British artist Brian Clarke, bridging the two elevations of Queen Victoria Street on a self-supporting, stainless steel and glass, split-level structure that sits between the original, listed buildings by Matcham. In the redevelopment, the 1960s arcade that had replaced the Empire Theatre was demolished and replaced by a branch of Harvey Nichols, which opened in 1996 as the first branch of the luxury store, now operating globally, outside London.

==== Stained glass ====
Cited as the largest work of public art in Britain at the time of its installation, the 749-square-metre stained-glass roof, which spans the 125-metre length of Queen Victoria Street, was designed by painter Brian Clarke between 1988 and 1990 as an integral part of the development scheme. Architects Latham and Co. had previously worked with the artist on the restoration of the Cavendish Arcade in Buxton, completed in 1987, which had likewise entailed the restoration and reuse of a complex of historical buildings through the creation of a public shopping space by the integration of a monumental artwork. The canopy at Leeds, made of mouth-blown antik (or 'antique') and opak glass, enamelled, refired, and acid-etched, and assembled using the mosaic technique, was fabricated under Clarke's supervision in Germany, and then installed at Leeds over a period of six months. The arcade's canopy remains the largest work of stained glass in Great Britain and in Europe. Its colour scheme was derived from the artist's study and adaptation of Frank Matcham's own colour palette in his designs for decorative glass. (Note: "I looked at the ornamental glass, Matcham himself designed. I had specimens scanned and reduced to colour constituents and then reduced my palette to Matcham's own." Clarke, cited in Kenneth Powell's essay 'Architectural Artist'.) The abstract, gridded canopy is said to reference Leeds' heritage as a centre of the textile industry in its design. The artwork received the Leeds Award for Architecture in 1991.

== Victoria Gate ==
Victoria Gate was built on an undeveloped site adjacent to Leeds Market. The £165 million covered shopping centre opened on 20 October 2016. The centre, fronting onto Eastgate, George Street and Harewood Street, comprises a large multi-storey car park, a John Lewis & Partners store, and a U-shaped covered pedestrian area of shops, restaurants, and cafes. The development incorporates Templar Square, a public space incorporating the listed Templar House.

=== History ===
A development known as Eastgate Quarters was announced in 2004, following several cancelled schemes for a site that had been derelict from the 1970s, located to the east of Leeds city centre. The 2004 Eastgate masterplan was developed by Terry Farrell and outline planning permission was obtained in 2007. A number of architects were appointed that year to design buildings in the masterplan, including the Jerde Partnership and Benoy for the Templar Arcade, Thomas Heatherwick for Harewood Quarter, ACME for the John Lewis Store and McAslan for buildings along Eastgate. The scheme was put on hold in late 2008. In 2010 Hammerson announced that work had commenced on a revised masterplan and in March 2011, an outline planning application for Eastgate Quarters developed by ACME was submitted to Leeds City Council. On 13 July 2011, planning permission was granted for the Hammerson scheme to proceed.

== Gallery ==
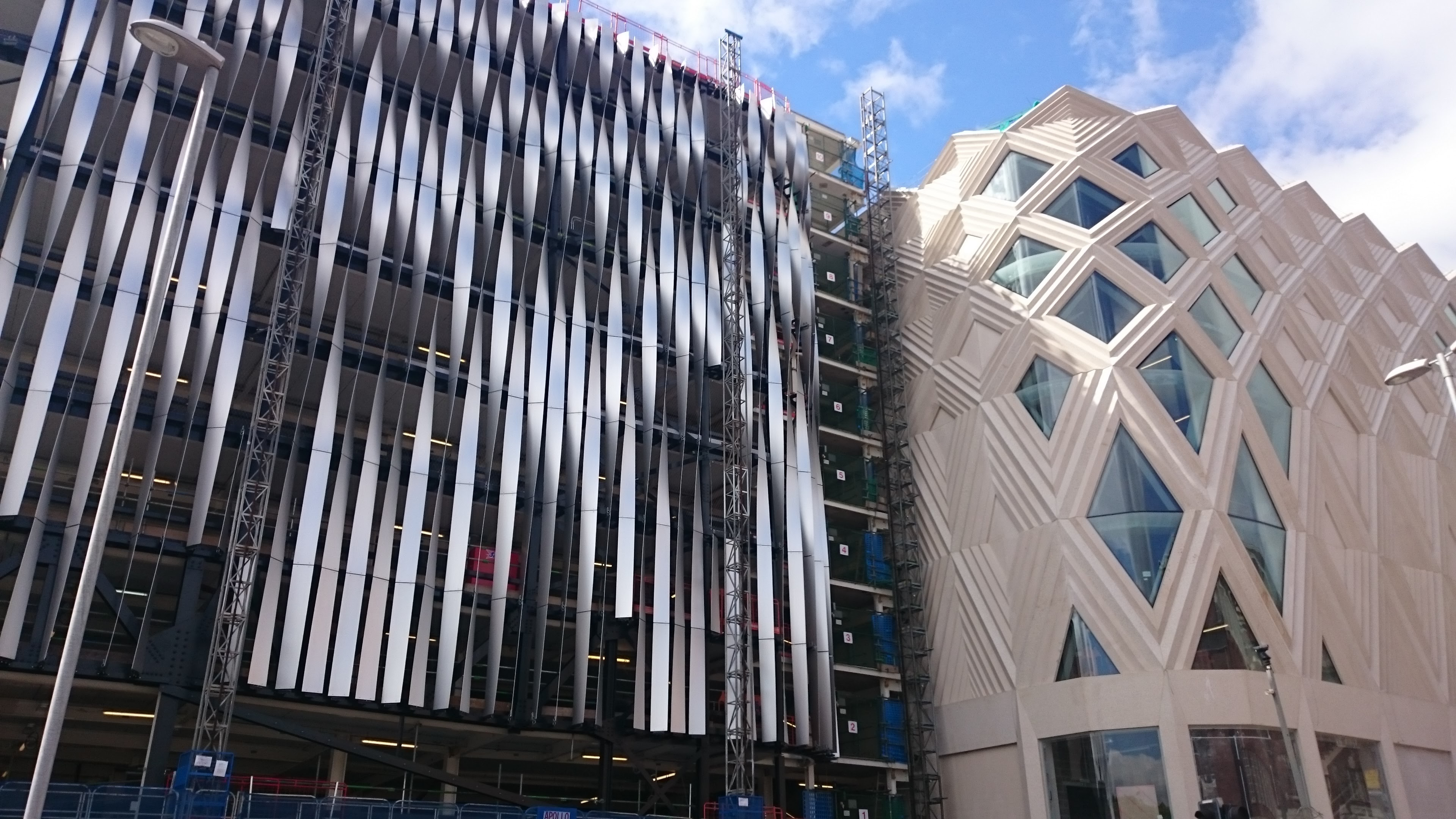
Victoria Gate car park (left) and John Lewis (right)

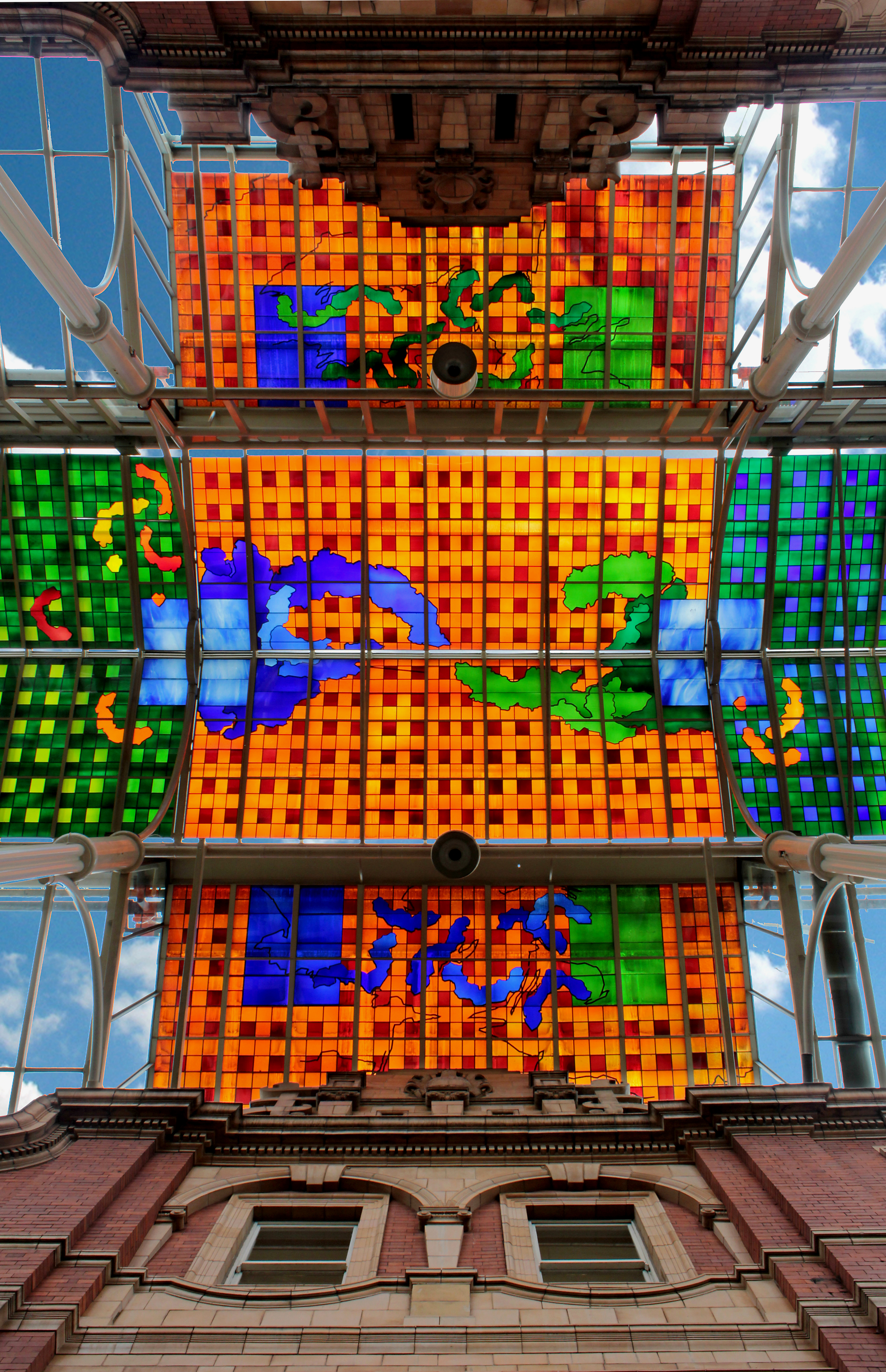
Detail of the stained glass canopy which spans the length of the Victoria Quarter's Queen Victoria Street arcade

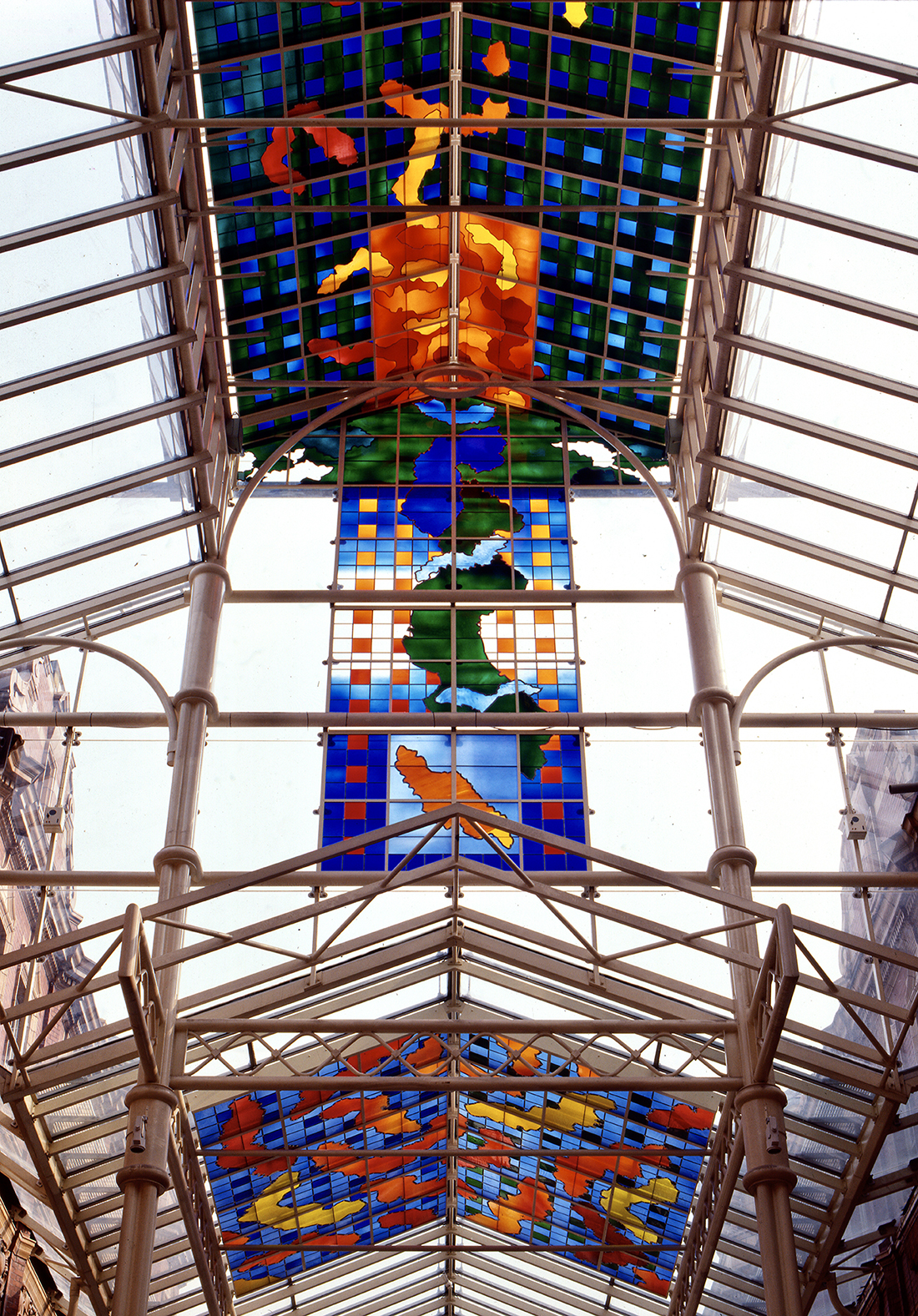
Stained glass ceiling of Victoria Quarter

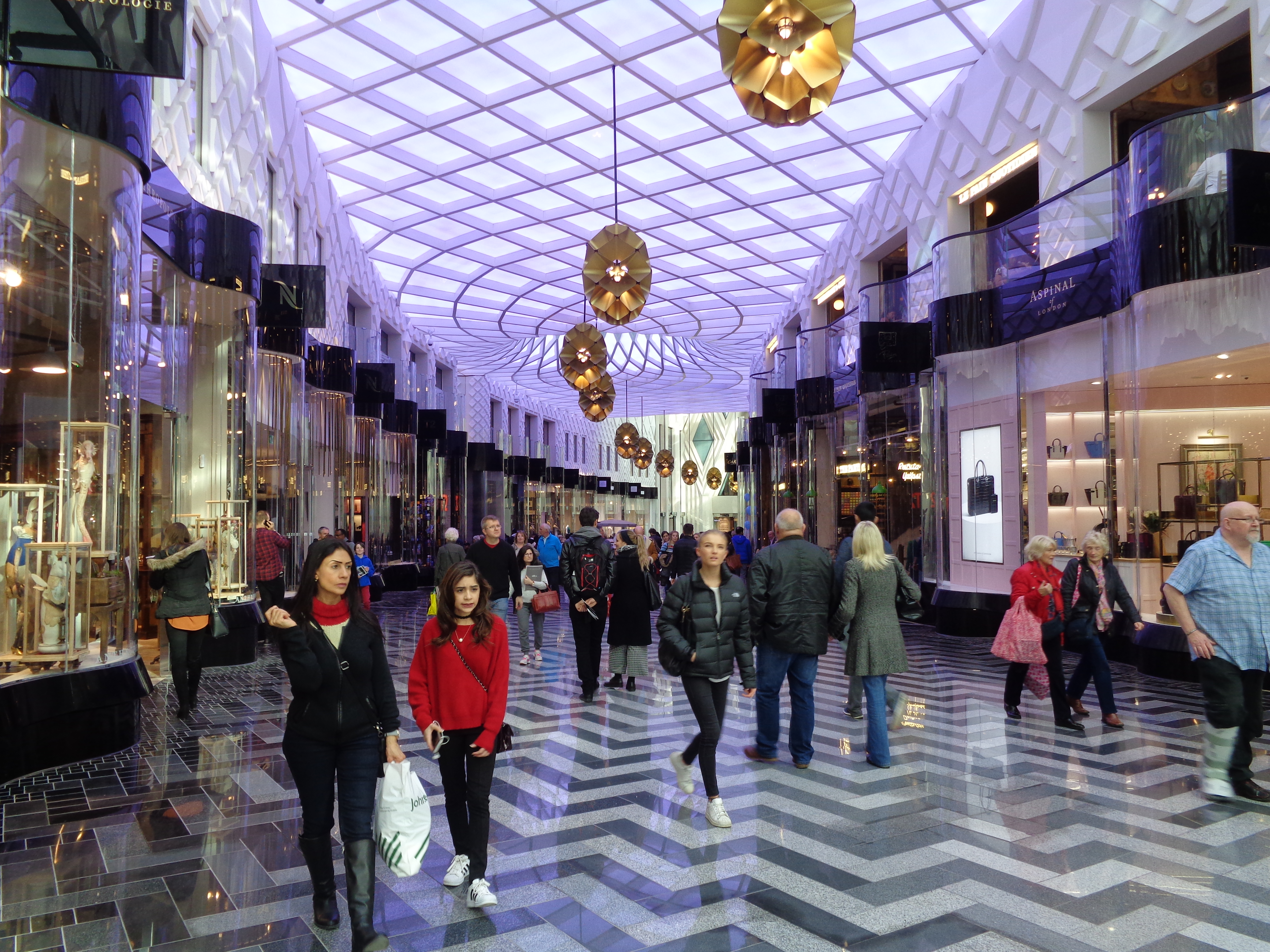
Opening day of Victoria Gate

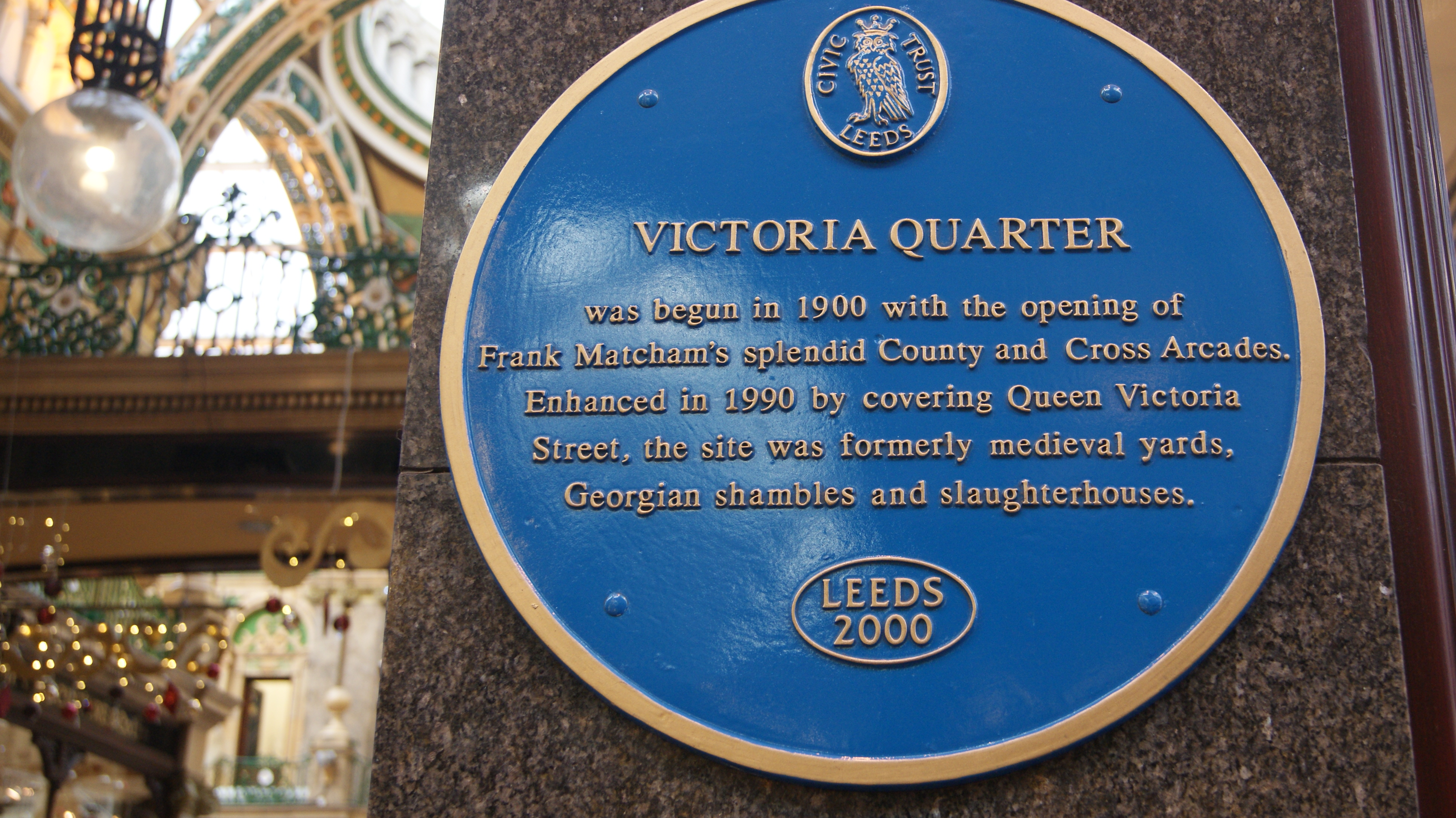
Blue plaque, County Arcade, Leeds (1 December 2017)
