= Grand Arcade (Barnet) =

Shopping arcade in North Finchley, London

Coordinates: 51.6135°N 0.1762°W

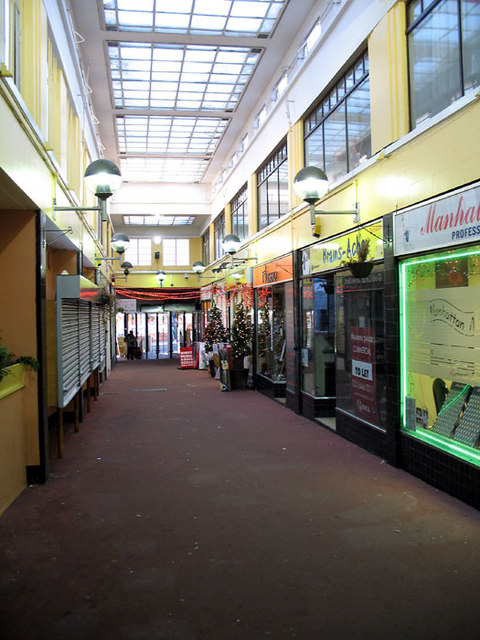
The Grand Arcade in 2006

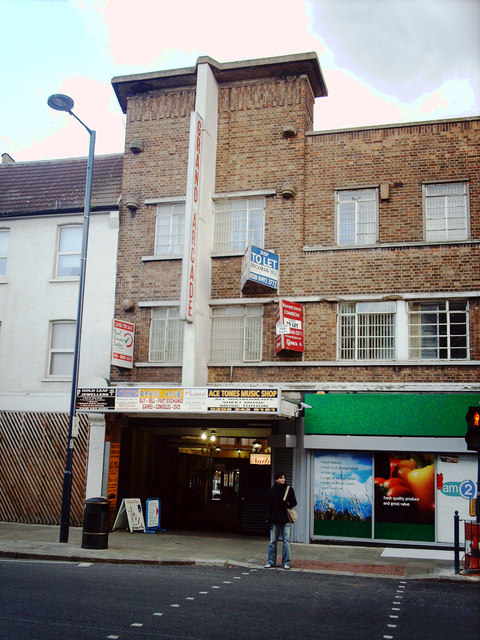
The Arcade entrance

The Grand Arcade is a 1930s art deco shopping arcade in North Finchley in London, England. The arcade contains a jewellers, a bric-a-brac shop, an immigration legal service, a craft shop and a photo studio.

As of August 2019, plans were being made to demolish the arcade and replace it with multi-storey flats and offices, with new shops on the ground floor. Dave Davies of The Kinks has campaigned for its preservation. In response to a consultation by the London Borough of Barnet, Historic England has suggested that the Arcade be identified as a building of merit.
