= Templar Hotel, Leeds =

Pub in Leeds, West Yorkshire, England

Coordinates: 53.800°N 1.539°W

Templar Hotel
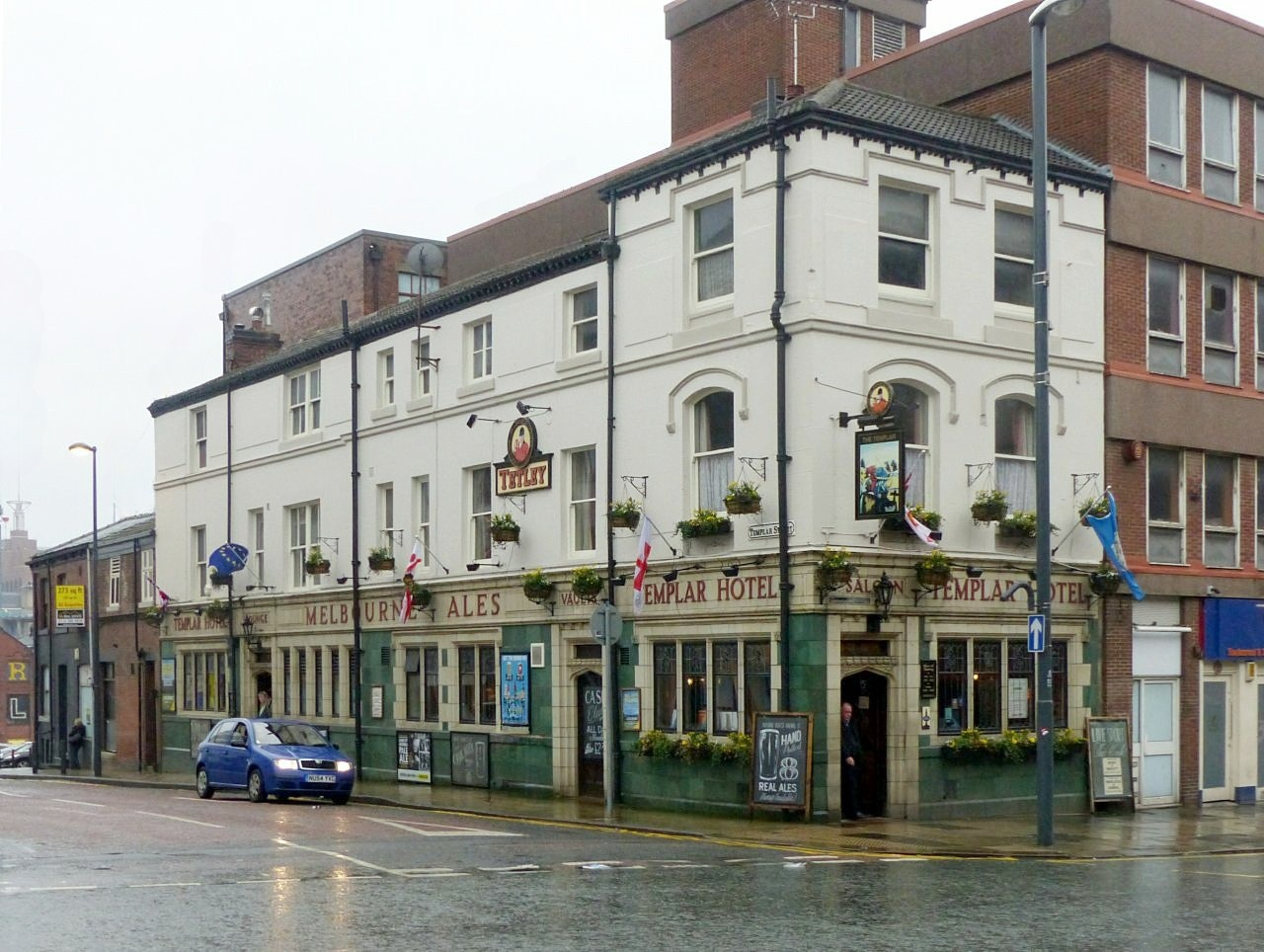
- View from Vicar Lane
- Type: Public house
- Location: Templar Street, Leeds, West Yorkshire, England
- Built: Early 19th century
- Restored by: Garside & Pennington
- Owner: Greene King

Listed Building – Grade II
- Designated: 6 November 2019
- Reference no.: 1460722

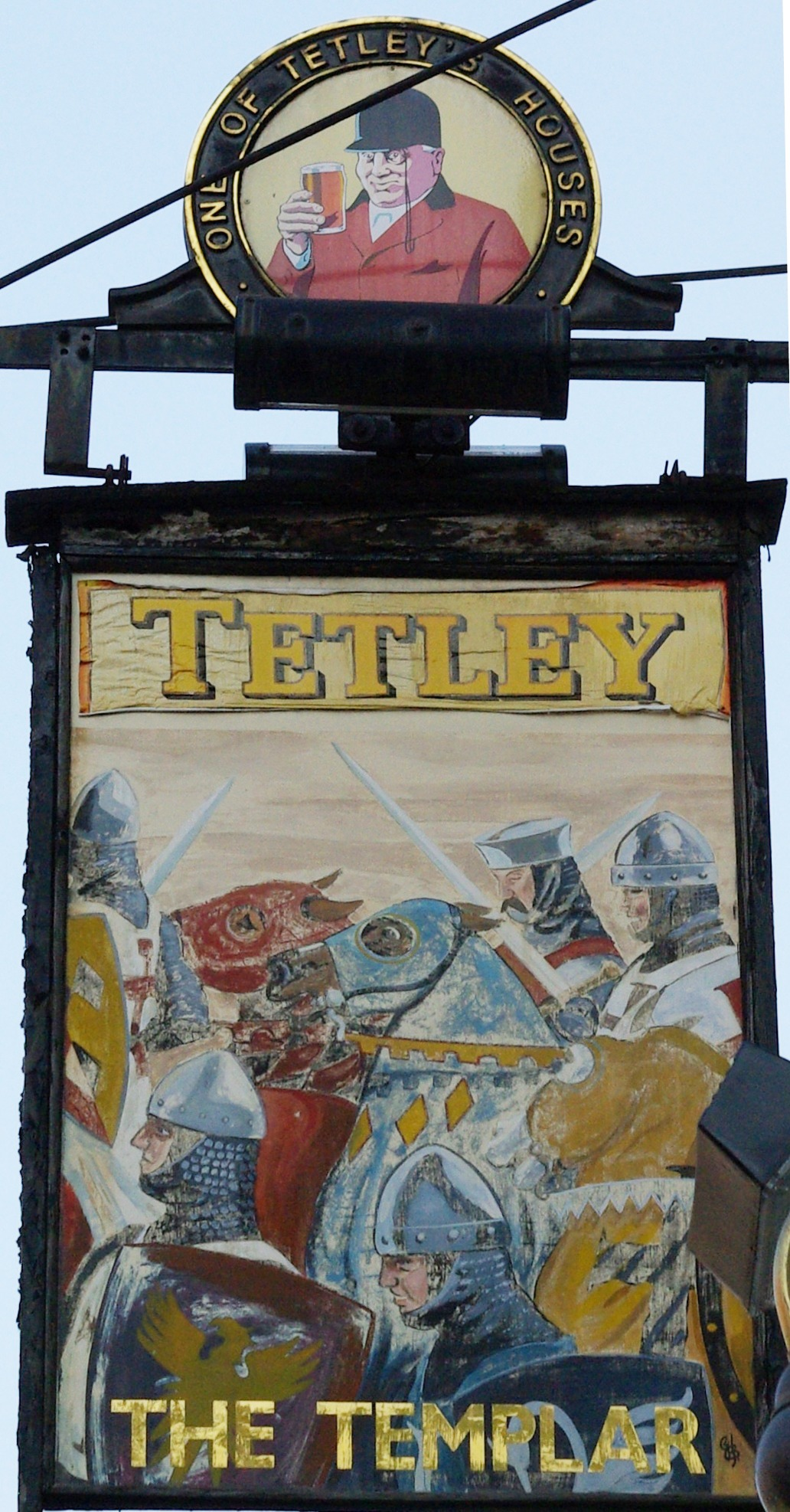
Pub sign

The Templar Hotel is a historic public house located on the corner of Templar Street and Vicar Lane in the city centre of Leeds, West Yorkshire, England. It was listed at Grade II by Historic England in 2019 following a campaign by Leeds Civic Trust, due to its many original 19th and 20th century external and interior features. The ground floor is clad with distinctive green and cream Burmantofts faience tiling with stained glass windows.

== Description ==
The Templar is a three-storey brick structure, with stuccoed upper floors and a buff and green faience-clad ground floor. It also has dressings in painted stone, a modillion eaves cornice, and a concrete tile roof. On the ground floor are mullioned windows with quoined surrounds, and doorways with Tudor arches, carved spandrels, and shallow fanlights, and above them is a frieze with lettering for the pub name and "Melbourne Ales". In the upper floors are sash windows, those in the first floor of the extension with segmental heads, and all in the extension with hood moulds. At the east end is a two-storey two-bay former brick brewhouse.

The relief lettering on the fascia reads "Templar Hotel", "Lounge", "Melbourne Ales", "Vault", "Templar Hotel" on the Templar Street side, and "Saloon" and "Templar Hotel" on the Vicar Lane side. However, there is no longer any internal division between the saloon and vault.

It has been described as a traditional and largely unspoilt pub. Internally, the fixtures and decorations dating from 1928 have been well-preserved. This includes a stained glass window (featuring an abstract art deco version of the Melbourne Brewery bowing courtier), wood panelling, fixed seating, the fireplace and the bar.

== History ==
The pub is uniquely named after the Knights Templar, a historic religious military order. A battle with medieval soldiers is depicted on the hanging pub sign.

Historic England considers the pub building and the attached former brewhouse to be of early 19th century construction, with a western extension fronting Vicar Lane being added later in the century. In 1927, the owner, John William McGonnell, sold the pub to the Leeds-based Melbourne Brewery. It contracted the architects Garside & Pennington of Pontefract to design a full refurbishment and remodelling, which took place during 1928. This added the faience ground-floor facades, using tiles from the close by Burmantofts Pottery, and introduced the majority of the features in the present-day interior. Works included opening up and inter-linking the ground floor spaces, relocating a Tudor-style fireplace to the first floor, laying a terrazzo floor in the hallway, and changes to the staircases and doors of the upper floors, which contain a landlord's flat and former hotel accommodation.

Further limited changes occurred in the 1970s; about a third of the bar was removed, new seating was installed in place of an entrance and fireplace, and fire partitioning put in place. The toilets were replaced in 1985 but retaining the 1928 Tudor-arched wooden doorways. Melbourne Brewery was taken over by Tetley's in 1960, and the Templar was transferred as a Melbourne tied house. A Tetley's sign featuring its huntsman logo was affixed to the pub's Templar Street elevation around this period. The current operator is the large pub chain Greene King, while the developer Hammerson holds the freehold and plans to restore the pub as part of a proposed mixed-use development on land to the north of Eastgate.

In 2019, the building was given a Grade II listing by Historic England as a building of special architectural or historic interest. The application for listing was promoted by Leeds Civic Trust.

== See also ==
- Listed buildings in Leeds (City and Hunslet Ward - northern area)
