= Grand Arcade (Leeds) =

Shopping arcade in Leeds, England

Coordinates: 53.8002°N 1.5403°W

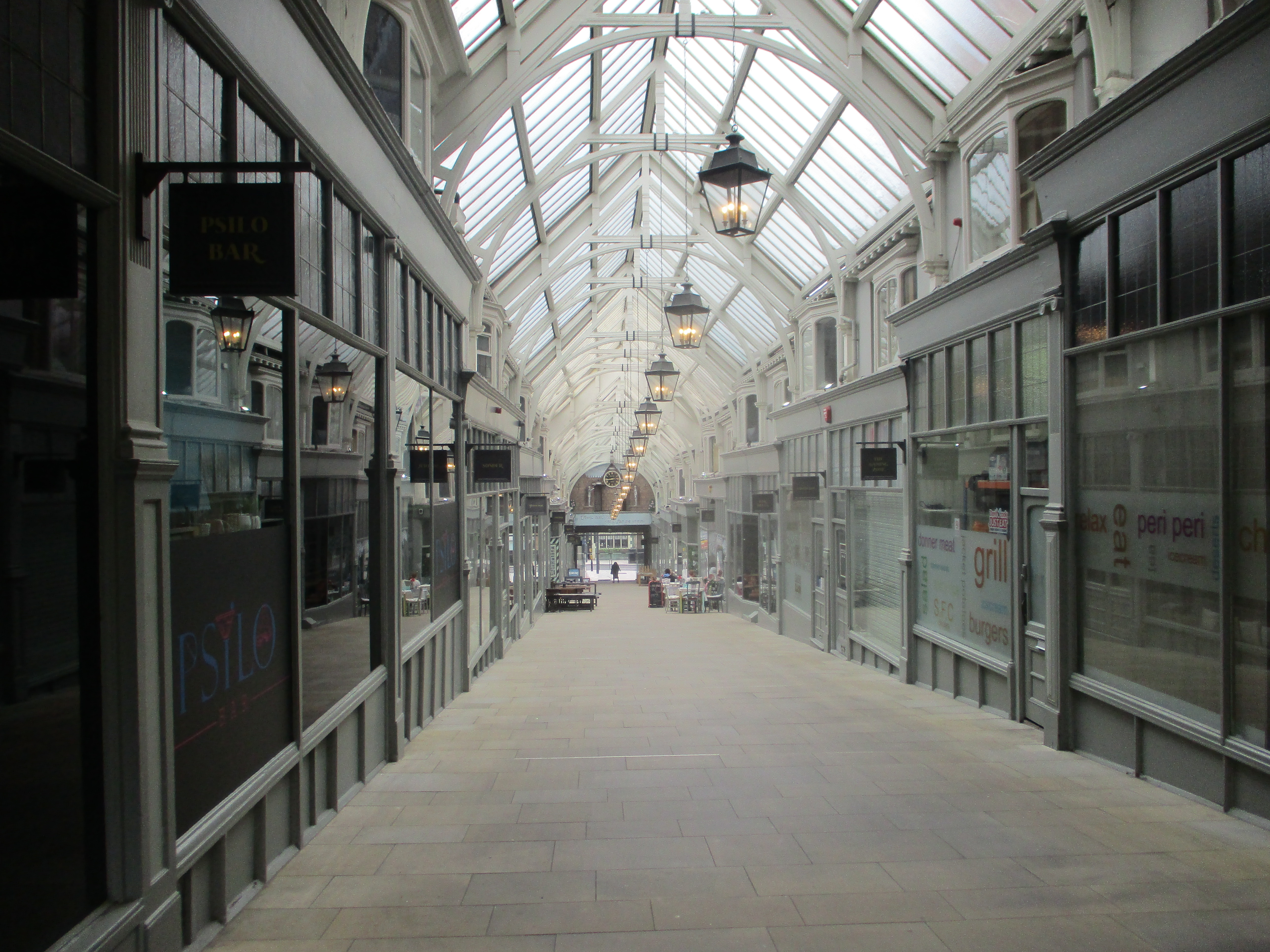
Interior

The Grand Arcade is a shopping arcade located on New Briggate in Leeds, West Yorkshire, England, and a Grade II listed building. It was built by New Briggate Arcade Company Ltd in 1897, with Smith & Tweedal as architects, in Renaissance style with Modern Style (British Art Nouveau style) details.

The arcade was built on land in Briggate owned by the Lupton family who had also owned land in nearby North Street/Mabgate and Merrion Street since the mid-18th century. Their Briggate land housed buildings including Lupton's Mill and its accompanying dam which were demolished by 1897 to build the arcade.

The arcade originally consisted of two parallel arcades running between Vicar Lane and New Briggate, with a cross passage onto Merrion Street. The northern arcade was converted to the Tower Cinema in 1920 and further converted into a nightclub in 1985. The remaining passage features an animated clock by Potts of Leeds.

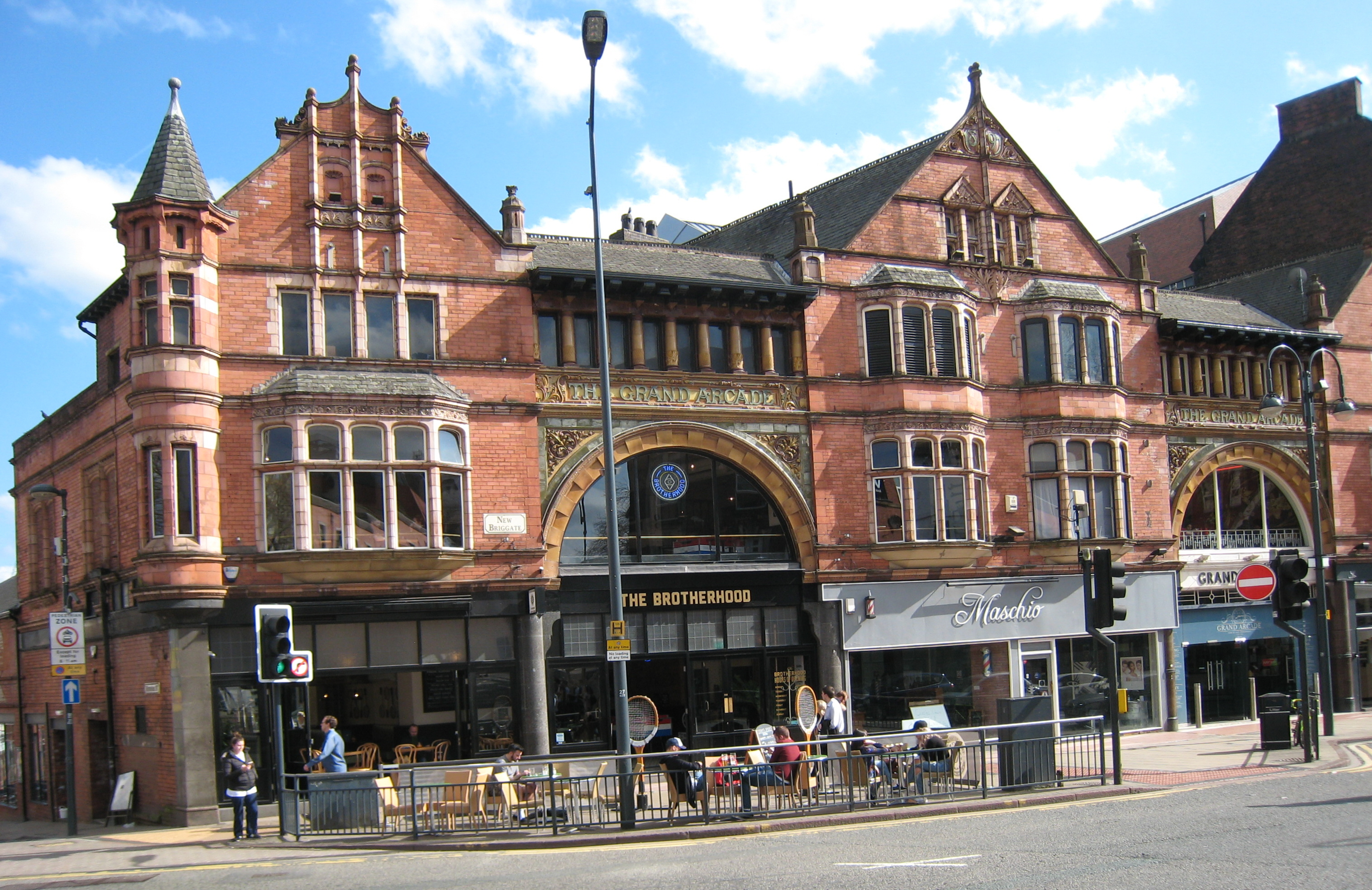
New Briggate frontage

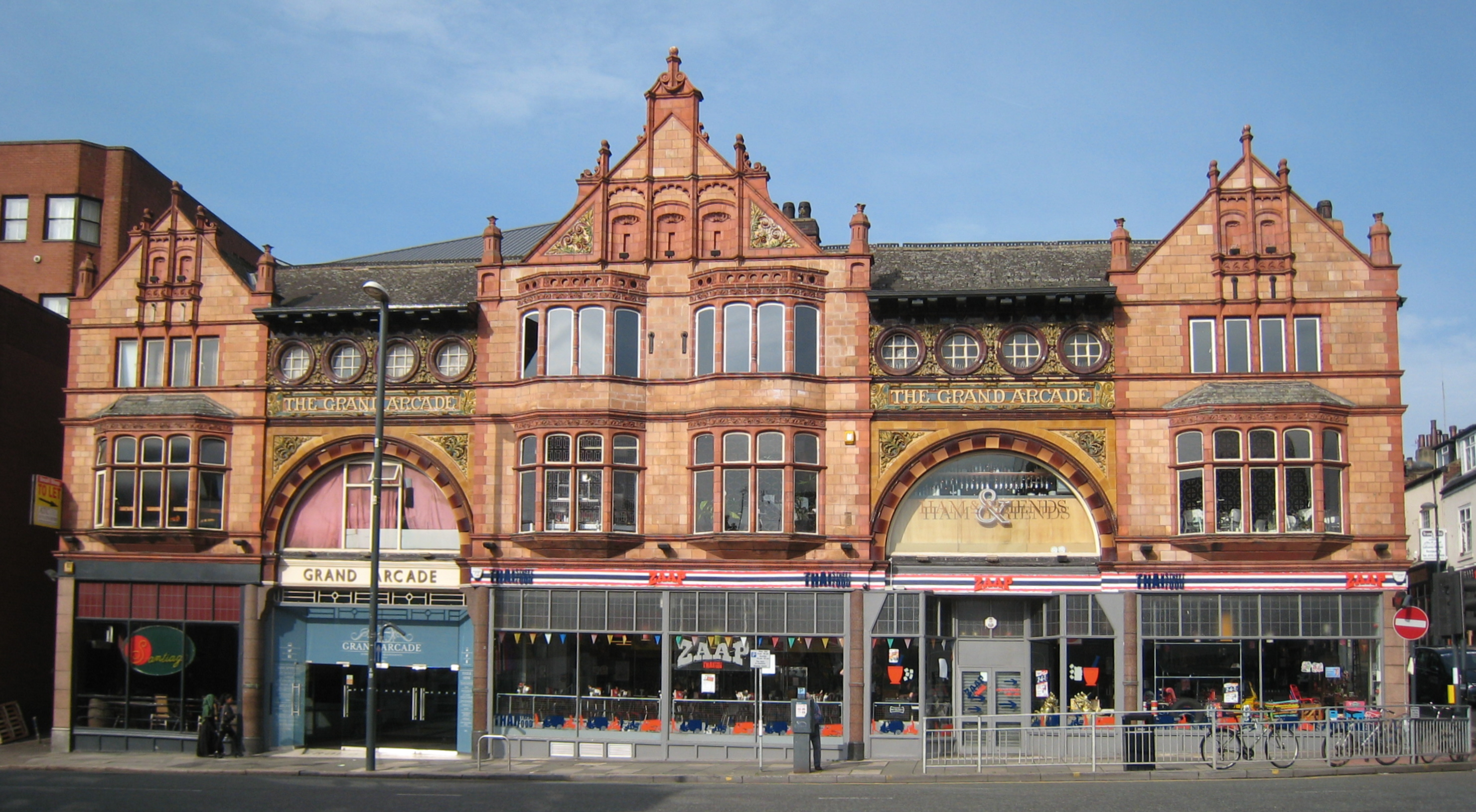
Exterior on Vicar Lane

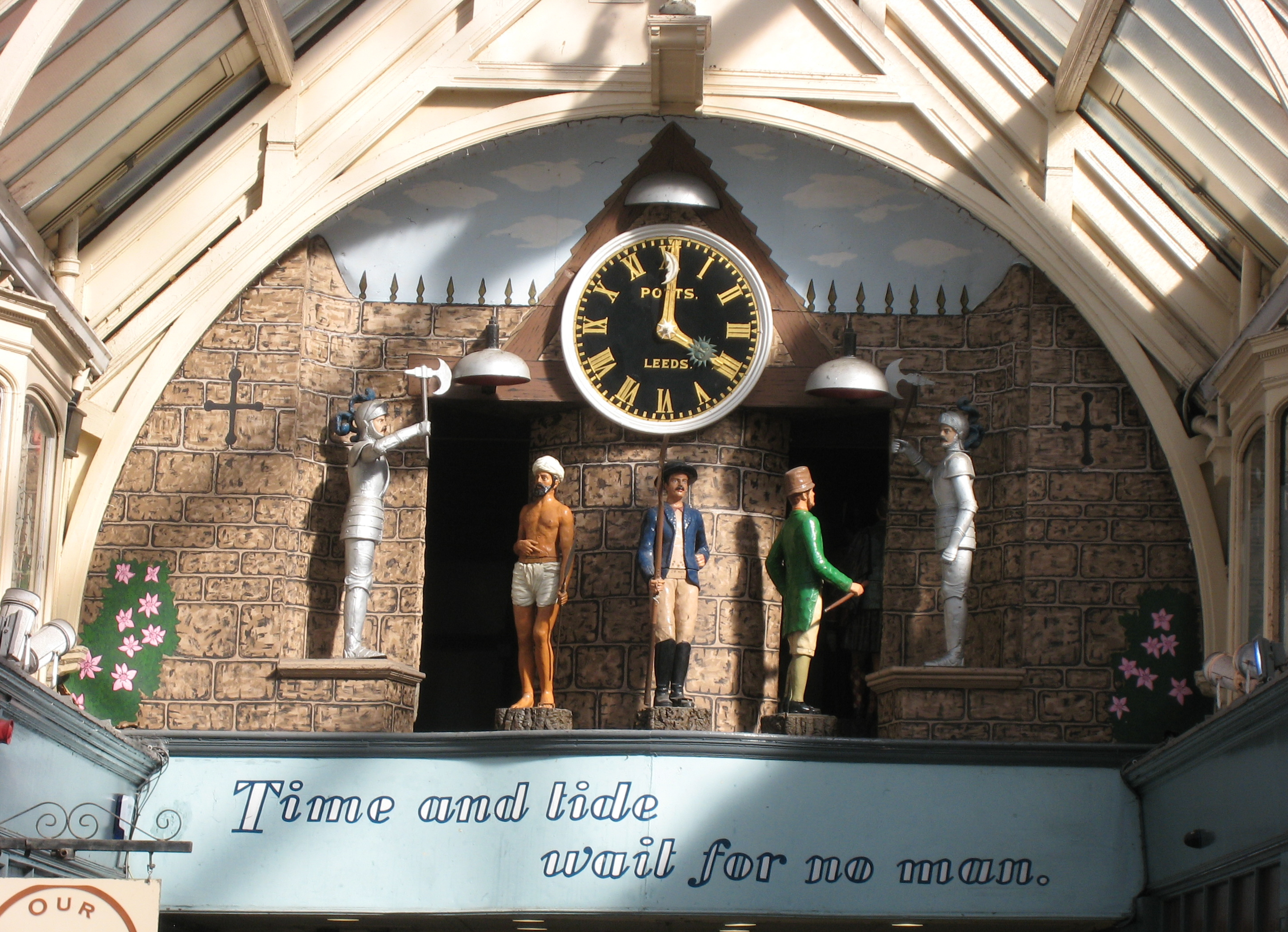
Potts clock

== See also ==
- Listed buildings in Leeds (City and Hunslet Ward - northern area)
