= Loiner =

Demonym for a citizen of Leeds, England

Loiner is a demonym, describing the citizens of Leeds.

The Rugby league club Leeds Rhinos were previously nicknamed the Loiners.

== History ==
While there are several theories, the actual origin of the term remains uncertain.

The three competing theories are:

- Loiner could derive from the name Loidis (in use by the eighth century for the district around modern-day Leeds).
- Another explanation says that in the 19th century there were many yards and closes around Briggate whose back entrances were known as Low Ins or Loins, hence Loiner.
- A third theory is that, in the area of Briggate, locals referred to numerous nearby streets as 'loins’, as a Leeds cognate for the Standard English word 'lanes'. People who gathered in these loins to gossip were therefore termed Loiners.

== Dialect ==
The term Leeds Loiner was included by Joseph Wright, a native of nearby Windhill and Wrose, in the English Dialect Dictionary. The definition was "An inhabitant of Leeds". The entry suggests that the origin is linked to Marsh Lane in Leeds.
