= Vicar Lane, Leeds =

Street in Leeds, England

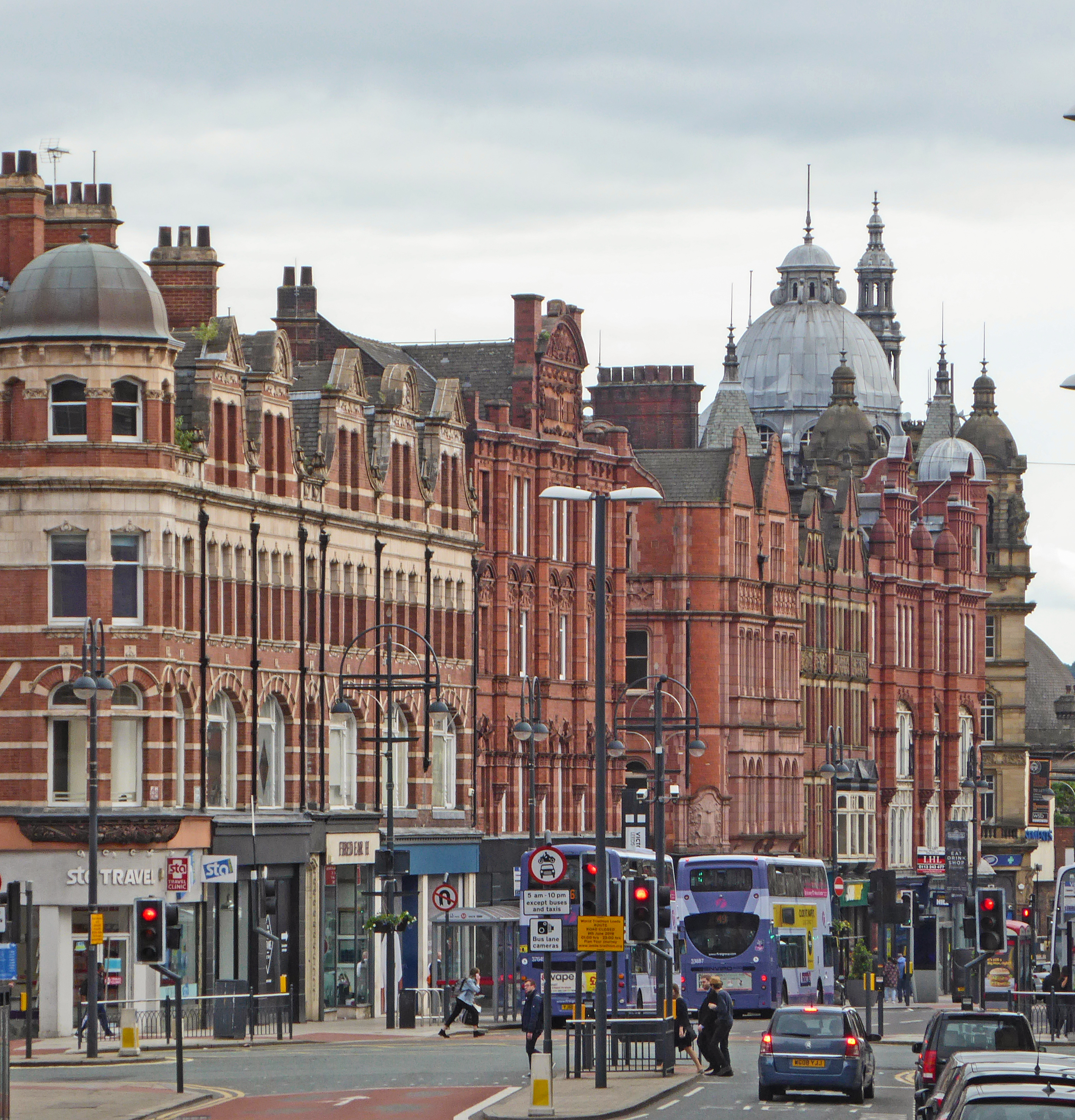
Buildings on the east side of the street, in 2019

Vicar Lane is a street in the city centre of Leeds, a city in England.

== History ==
The street was first shown on a plan of 1560, with some buildings already lying on the street. The town's workhouse was built on its corner with Lady Lane in 1726, while at its junction with Kirkgate, there was an open area with pens for livestock taken to market.

The road long marked the eastern edge of central Leeds, with back-to-back housing to its east. In 1857, Kirkgate Market was built, with its main frontage on Vicar Lane, and when in 1904 it was rebuilt, the opportunity was taken to widen the street. By 1909, it was regarded as one of the main shopping streets in the city. Shops included the Willis Ludlow department store. In 1930, a bus station was opened, serving routes to towns north of Leeds and on the coast, only closing in 1990. In 1964, much of the street was made one-way, but in 2021 it reopened to buses and taxis in both directions.

== Layout and architecture ==
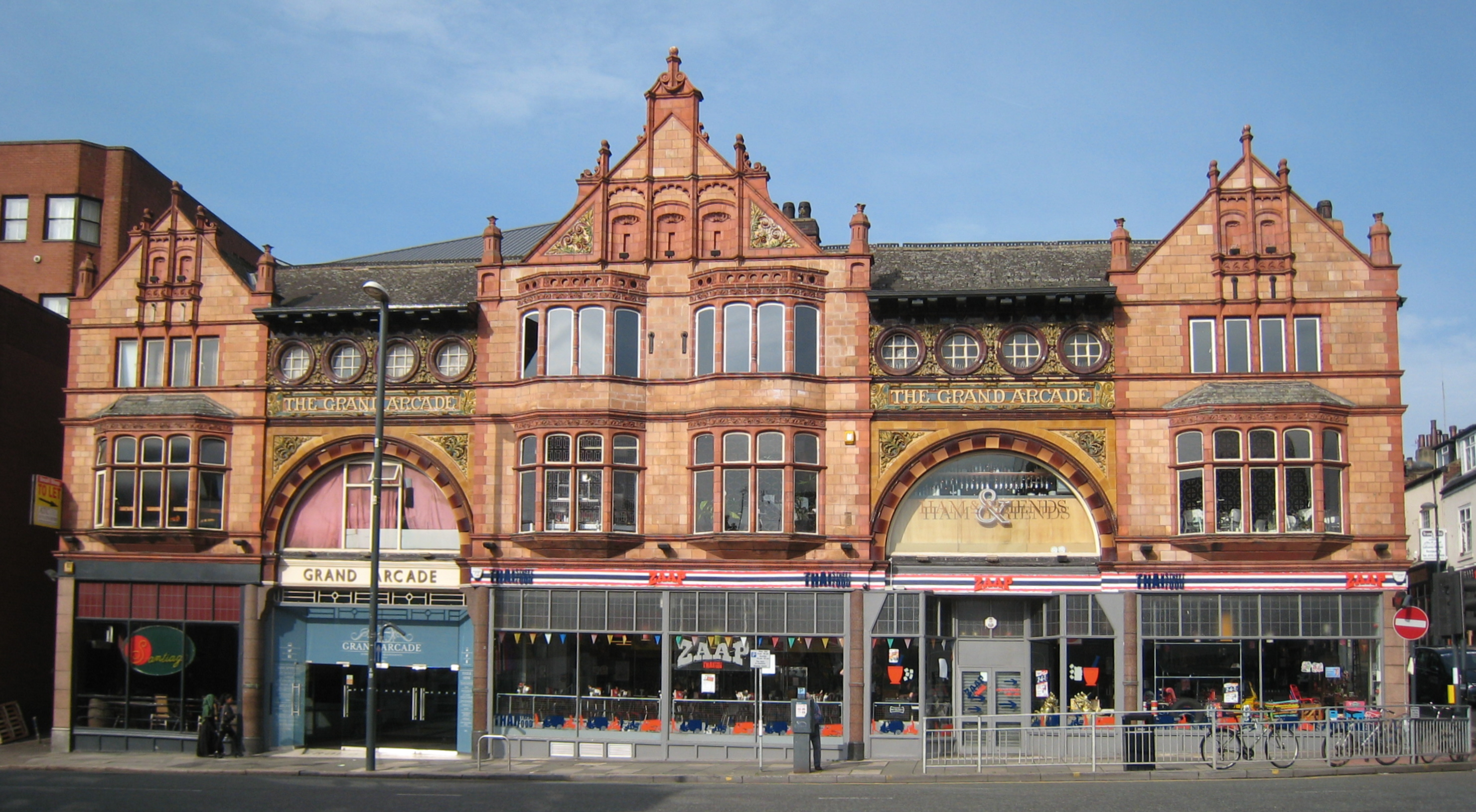
Exterior of the Grand Arcade, in 2017

The road runs north from a crossroads with Kirkgate, continuing the line of New Market Street. On its west side, it has junctions with Fish Street, King Edward Street, The Headrow, Harrison Street, Merrion Street, and Merrion Place. On its east side, it has junctions with Ludgate Hill, Sidney Street, Eastgate, Lady Lane, North Court, and Templar Street. It ends at a major junction with the Leeds Inner Ring Road, where it merges with New Briggate, and the two continue together as North Street.

Listed buildings on the west side of the street include the early-19th century General Eliott pub, early-20th century 49-51 Vicar Lane, the Victoria Leeds complex of arcades, and the Grand Arcade. On the east side lie Kirkgate Market, the early-20th century 50–56 Vicar Lane, 58 Vicar Lane, 60 and 62 Vicar Lane, Wrays Buildings, Coronation Buildings, County Houses, 90–94 Vicar Lane, the early-19th century Templar Hotel.
