= 1999 Bradford Bulls season =

- Super League IV Rank: 1st
- Play-off result: Runners Up
- Challenge Cup: Semi-final
- 1999 record: Wins: 29; draws: 1; losses: 6
- Points scored: For: 1123; against: 544

Team information
- Chairman: Chris Caisley
- Head Coach: Matthew Elliot
- Captain: Robbie Paul
- Stadium: Odsal Stadium
- Avg. attendance: 12,912
- High attendance: 24,020 vs. Leeds Rhinos

Top scorers
- Tries: Michael Withers (21)
- Goals: Steve McNamara (98)
- Points: Steve McNamara (221)
← 1998	List of seasons	2000 →

This article details the Bradford Bulls rugby league football club's 1999 season, the 4th season of the Super League era.

== Season review ==
February 1999

The Bulls kicked off their 1999 season with a huge bang as they thrashed Workington Town 92–0 in the Challenge Cup. They progressed through to the quarter-finals by defeating Wakefield Trinity Wildcats 26–8.

March 1999

Bradford won their first Super League game of the year 18–6 against Sheffield Eagles. The Bulls progressed to the semi-finals of the Challenge Cup by beating Warrington Wolves 52–16. Bradford's winning streak continued with an 8–3 win over Hull Sharks. Bradford's first loss of the season came in the Challenge Cup semi-final as they were beaten 23–10 by arch-rivals Leeds Rhinos.

April 1999

The Bulls didn't have to wait long to avenge the semi-final loss, the very next week Bradford beat Leeds 18–14 in front of a 16,000 plus crowd at Odsal which meant the Bulls retained 2nd place in the table. After the high of beating Leeds the Bulls came crashing back down to earth after suffering a 58–14 loss to St. Helens. However they soon got their season back on track with a 26–16 win against Wakefield Trinity Wildcats at home, they followed this win with another victory, this time a 22–14 win away at Warrington Wolves. Bradford finished the month with a 20–2 win against fellow Yorkshire team Halifax Blue Sox.

May 1999

Bradford kicked May off with an 18–18 draw against Castleford Tigers which was the Bulls first draw in the Super League history. The following week Bradford hammered Salford City Reds with a 46–6 victory, soon after the Bulls beat Gateshead Thunder 22–12 at the Thunderdome. In one of the Bulls best performances of the year they beat Wigan Warriors 19–2, keeping the Super League champions try less. Bradford's dominance throughout May ended with a 22–20 win against Huddersfield Giants.

June 1999

Bradford kicked off June with an outstanding 52–2 win against Sheffield Eagles. The Bulls great run of form continued with an astonishing 74–12 win against London Broncos at Odsal Stadium, however they were soon brought to a low as they crashed to a 45–16 loss against arch rivals Leeds Rhinos. They didn't let this heavy defeat get them down as they took St. Helens apart the following week and won 46–22 ensuring that they stayed at the top of the league.

July 1999

The Bulls beat Wakefield Trinity Wildcats 36–8 in the first game in July, this win kept them at the top of the table. They followed this win with a clinical performance against Huddersfield Giants and came out 26–0 winners. Bradford's good run of results continued with an outstanding 56–6 win against Warrington Wolves. They travelled to Halifax and beat them 34–20 in a tough match to make sure their status as league leaders was intact, this continued with a 24–22 win against Castleford Tigers. The next match saw the Bulls beat London Broncos 19–16 in a hard fought game at Welford Road.

August 1999

Bradford started off August with a comprehensive 58–20 win over Salford City Reds. Gateshead Thunder was the next to lose in the Bulls run of impressive victories as Bradford beat them 30–14. Bradford's long run of successive wins was brought to and end as Wigan Warriors beat the Bulls 14–0 which makes it the first time in the Super League history that the Bulls have been scoreless in a game. However they bounced back a week later to thrash Sheffield Eagles 52–4. Bradford then beat Hull Sharks 44–12 to ensure that they stayed at the top of the league and would be Super League minor premiers for the 1999 season.

September 1999

Bradford beat their arch-rivals Leeds Rhinos 19–18 with a last minute drop goal from Michael Withers in front of a 24,020 crowd at Odsal Stadium. The Bulls finished off the regular season with a 25–16 loss to St. Helens however Bradford were awarded the League Leader's Shield for finishing top of the league. Bradford once again faced St. Helens but this time in the Qualifying Semi-final, Bradford beat the Saints 40–4 with Henry Paul pulling the strings and contributing by scoring 2 tries. However Saints were to get their revenge as they beat Bradford 8–6 in a hard fought Grand Final with Henry Paul scoring all 6 of Bradford's points.

== 1999 milestones ==
- CCR4: Nathan McAvoy scored his 1st four-try haul and 1st hat-trick for the Bulls.
- CCR4: Michael Withers scored his 1st try, 1st four-try haul and 1st hat-trick for the Bulls.
- CCR4: Nick Zisti and Stuart Fielden scored their 1st tries for the Bulls.
- CCR5: Henry Paul scored his 1st try for the Bulls.
- Round 1: Henry Paul kicked his 1st goal for the Bulls.
- CCQF: Tevita Vaikona scored his 1st four-try haul and 1st hat-trick for the Bulls.
- CCQF: David Boyle and Scott Naylor scored their 1st tries for the Bulls.
- Round 5: Steve McNamara kicked his 300th goal for the Bulls.
- Round 9: Leon Pryce scored his 1st try for the Bulls.
- Round 11: Robbie Paul scored his 50th try and reaches 200 points for the Bulls.
- Round 11: Paul Deacon kicked his 1st drop-goal for the Bulls.
- Round 13: Jamie Peacock scored his 1st try for the Bulls.
- Round 13: Steve McNamara reached 700 points for the Bulls.
- Round 14: Paul Deacon reached 100 points for the Bulls.
- Round 14: Mike Forshaw scored his 1st hat-trick for the Bulls.
- Round 15: Nathan McAvoy scored his 2nd four-try haul and 2nd hat-trick for the Bulls.
- Round 18: James Lowes reached 200 points for the Bulls.
- Round 18: Phil Howlett scored his 1st try for the Bulls.
- Round 20: Brian McDermott scored his 1st hat-trick for the Bulls.
- Round 20: James Lowes scored his 50th try for the Bulls.
- Round 24: Steve McNamara reached 800 points for the Bulls.
- Round 27: Brian McDermott scored his 25th try and reached 100 points for the Bulls.
- Round 28: Michael Withers scored his 2nd four-try haul and 2nd hat-trick for the Bulls.
- Round 29: Tevita Vaikona scored his 25th try and reached 100 points for the Bulls.
- Round 29: Michael Withers kicked his 1st drop-goal for the Bulls.
- Qualifying Semi-final: Henry Paul reached 100 points for the Bulls.

== Table ==
	Team	Pld	W	D	L	PF	PA	PD	Pts
1	Bradford Bulls	30	25	1	4	897	445	+452	51
2	St. Helens	30	23	0	7	1034	561	+473	46
3	Leeds Rhinos	30	22	1	7	910	558	+352	45
4	Wigan Warriors	30	21	1	8	877	390	+487	43
5	Castleford Tigers	30	19	3	8	712	451	+261	41
6	Gateshead Thunder	30	19	1	10	775	576	+199	39
7	Warrington Wolves	30	15	1	14	700	717	−17	31
8	London Broncos	30	13	2	15	644	708	−64	28
9	Halifax Blue Sox	30	11	0	19	573	792	−219	22
10	Sheffield Eagles	30	10	1	19	518	818	−300	21
11	Wakefield Trinity Wildcats	30	10	0	20	608	795	−187	20
12	Salford City Reds	30	6	1	23	526	916	−390	13
13	Hull Sharks	30	5	0	25	422	921	−499	10
14	Huddersfield Giants	30	5	0	25	463	1011	−548	10

Play-offs

== 1999 fixtures and results ==
LEGEND
Win
Draw
Loss

1999 JJB Sports Super League

Date	Competition	Rnd	Vrs	H/A	Venue	Result	Score	Tries	Goals	Att
7 March 1999	Super League IV	1	Sheffield Eagles	H	Odsal Stadium	W	18–6	Lowes, McAvoy, Withers	H.Paul 3/3	12,044
21 March 1999	Super League IV	2	Hull Sharks	A	The Boulevard	W	8–3	McAvoy	McNamara 2/2	6,577
1 April 1999	Super League IV	3	Leeds Rhinos	H	Odsal Stadium	W	18–14	Forshaw, H.Paul, R.Paul	McNamara 1/1, H.Paul 2/2	16,049
5 April 1999	Super League IV	4	St. Helens	A	Knowsley Road	L	14–58	Dwyer, Harmon	Deacon 3/3	15,042
11 April 1999	Super League IV	5	Wakefield Trinity Wildcats	H	Odsal Stadium	W	26–16	Boyle, Lowes, Naylor, D.Peacock	McNamara 5/5	11,802
18 April 1999	Super League IV	6	Warrington Wolves	A	Wilderspool Stadium	W	22–14	Boyle, Naylor, Spruce, Withers	H.Paul 3/4	7,591
23 April 1999	Super League IV	7	Halifax Blue Sox	H	Odsal Stadium	W	20–2	Fielden, McAvoy, Vaikona, Withers	McNamara 2/4	11,103
3 May 1999	Super League IV	8	Castleford Tigers	A	The Jungle	D	18–18	McNamara, R.Paul	McNamara 5/5	10,122
9 May 1999	Super League IV	9	Salford City Reds	H	Odsal Stadium	W	46–6	Spruce (2), Jowitt, McAvoy, McDermott, McNamara, R.Paul, Pryce	McNamara 4/5, Deacon 3/3	11,863
16 May 1999	Super League IV	10	Gateshead Thunder	A	Thunderdome	W	22–12	Jowitt, H.Paul, Pryce	McNamara 1/1, Deacon 2/2, H.Paul 2/2	6,631
22 May 1999	Super League IV	11	Wigan Warriors	H	Odsal Stadium	W	19–2	R.Paul, Withers	McNamara 1/1, Deacon 4/4, Deacon 1 DG	13,476
30 May 1999	Super League IV	12	Huddersfield Giants	H	Odsal Stadium	W	22–20	Fielden, Lowes, Pryce, Spruce	Deacon 3/4	11,032
5 June 1999	Super League IV	13	Sheffield Eagles	A	Saltergate	W	52–2	Spruce (2), Boyle, Lowes, McAvoy, McDermott, R.Paul, J.Peacock, Pryce	Deacon 3/3, H.Paul 3/3, McNamara 2/3	4,801
9 June 1999	Super League IV	14	London Broncos	H	Odsal Stadium	W	74–12	Forshaw (3), J.Peacock (2), Spruce (2), Deacon, Fielden, McAvoy, Naylor, R.Paul, Withers	Deacon 6/7, H.Paul 5/6	9,575
13 June 1999	Super League IV	15	Hull Sharks	H	Odsal Stadium	W	42–14	McAvoy (4), R.Paul (2), Fielden	McNamara 5/5, Deacon 2/3	11,757
18 June 1999	Super League IV	16	Leeds Rhinos	A	Headingley Stadium	L	16–45	H.Paul (2), Boyle	McNamara 1/2, H.Paul 1/1	21,666
25 June 1999	Super League IV	17	St. Helens	H	Odsal Stadium	W	46–22	Lowes (2), Pryce (2), Forshaw, McAvoy, Naylor, H.Paul, Spruce	Deacon 3/5, McNamara 2/4	15,107
2 July 1999	Super League IV	18	Wakefield Trinity Wildcats	A	Belle Vue	W	36–8	Lowes (2), Boyle, Donougher, Howlett, J.Peacock	McNamara 5/5, Deacon 1/1	4,685
7 July 1999	Super League IV	19	Huddersfield Giants	A	McAlpine Stadium	W	26–0	Lowes, McNamara, Naylor, Withers	McNamara 5/5	6,581
11 July 1999	Super League IV	20	Warrington Wolves	H	Odsal Stadium	W	56–6	McDermott (3), Jowitt (2), Anderson, Lowes, Pryce, Spruce	McNamara 10/10	13,063
18 July 1999	Super League IV	21	Halifax Blue Sox	A	The Shay	W	34–20	Lowes (2), Vaikona (2), Fielden, Spruce	McNamara 5/6	9,342
25 July 1999	Super League IV	22	Castleford Tigers	H	Odsal Stadium	W	24–22	Lowes, McAvoy, H.Paul, Spruce	McNamara 4/4	13,824
28 July 1999	Super League IV	23	London Broncos	A	Welford Road	W	19–16	Boyle, McAvoy, Withers	McNamara 3/3, McNamara 1 DG	8,233
1 August 1999	Super League IV	24	Salford City Reds	A	The Willows	W	58–20	J.Peacock (2), Spruce (2), Withers (2), Boyle, Howlett, McAvoy, McNamara, H.Paul	McNamara 6/9, Deacon 1/2	6,680
8 August 1999	Super League IV	25	Gateshead Thunder	H	Odsal Stadium	W	30–14	Boyle (2), Pryce (2), Lowes, Withers	H.Paul 2/3, McNamara 1/3	12,492
13 August 1999	Super League IV	26	Wigan Warriors	A	JJB Stadium	L	0–14	–	–	10,734
22 August 1999	Super League IV	27	Sheffield Eagles	H	Odsal Stadium	W	52–4	Vaikona (2), Anderson, Donougher, Forshaw, McDermott, Naylor, H.Paul, Withers	McNamara 8/9	11,029
29 August 1999	Super League IV	28	Hull Sharks	A	The Boulevard	W	44–12	Withers (4), Pryce (2), Boyle, Vaikona	McNamara 6/8	5,036
3 September 1999	Super League IV	29	Leeds Rhinos	H	Odsal Stadium	W	19–18	McAvoy, Pryce, Vaikona	McNamara 3/3, Withers 1 DG	24,020
10 September 1999	Super League IV	30	St. Helens	A	Knowsley Road	L	16–25	Fielden, McNamara, R.Paul	McNamara 2/3	8,490

== Challenge Cup ==
LEGEND
Win
Draw
Loss

Date	Competition	Rnd	Vrs	H/A	Venue	Result	Score	Tries	Goals	Att
14 February 1999	Cup	4th	Workington Town	H	Odsal Stadium	W	92–0	McAvoy (4), Withers (4), Lowes (2), Zisti (2), Deacon, Fielden, McDermott, R.Paul, Vaikona	Deacon 12/17	7,593
28 February 1999	Cup	5th	Wakefield Trinity Wildcats	A	Belle Vue	W	26–8	Fielden, Lowes, McNamara, H.Paul	Deacon 3/3, McNamara 2/2	7,385
14 March 1999	Cup	QF	Warrington Wolves	H	Odsal Stadium	W	52–16	Vaikona (4), Boyle, Forshaw, Naylor, R.Paul, Spruce, Withers	H.Paul 6/10	10,430
28 March 1999	Cup	SF	Leeds Rhinos	N	McAlpine Stadium	L	10–23	Boyle, Lowes	H.Paul 1/2	23,438

== Playoffs ==
LEGEND
Win
Draw
Loss

Date	Competition	Rnd	Vrs	H/A	Venue	Result	Score	Tries	Goals	Att
26 September 1999	Play-offs	QSF	St. Helens	H	Odsal Stadium	W	40–4	H.Paul (2), Fielden, Naylor, Vaikona, Withers	McNamara 7/7, Deacon 1/1	16,162
9 October 1999	Play-offs	GF	St. Helens	N	Old Trafford	L	6–8	H.Paul	H.Paul 1/1	50,717

== 1999 squad statistics ==
- Appearances and Points include (Super League, Challenge Cup and Play-offs) as of 2012.

No	Player	Position	Tries	Goals	DG	Points
1	Robbie Paul	Fullback	11	0	0	44
2	Tevita Vaikona	Wing	13	0	0	52
3	Danny Peacock	Centre	1	0	0	4
4	Nathan McAvoy	Centre	19	0	0	76
5	Michael Withers	Wing	21	0	1	85
6	Henry Paul	Stand Off	12	29	0	106
7	Paul Deacon	Scrum-half	2	47	1	103
8	Neil Harmon	Prop	1	0	0	4
9	James Lowes	Hooker	18	0	0	72
10	Paul Anderson	Prop	2	0	0	8
11	Jeremy Donougher	Second Row	2	0	0	8
12	Mike Forshaw	Second Row	7	0	0	28
13	Steve McNamara	Loose forward	6	98	1	221
14	Nick Zisti	Wing	2	0	0	8
15	David Boyle	Second Row	12	0	0	48
16	Warren Jowitt	Prop	4	0	0	16
17	Leon Pryce	Wing	12	0	0	48
18	Lee Radford	Wing	0	0	0	0
19	Jamie Peacock	Second Row	6	0	0	24
20	Scott Naylor	Centre	8	0	0	32
22	Brian McDermott	Prop	7	0	0	28
23	Bernard Dwyer	Second Row	1	0	0	4
25	Phil Howlett	Wing	2	0	0	8
26	Paul Sykes	Centre	0	0	0	0
28	Stuart Spruce	Fullback	15	0	0	60
29	Stuart Fielden	Prop	9	0	0	36
