= Robert Gould =

Robert or Bob Gould may refer to:

== Sportspeople ==
- Bob Gould (rugby union) (1863–1931), Welsh rugby union player
- Bobby Gould (born 1946), English footballer and manager
- Bobby Gould (ice hockey) (1957–2026), Canadian ice hockey player
- Robbie Gould (Robert Paul Gould, born 1981), American football player

== Other people ==
- Bob Gould (activist) (1937–2011), Australian activist and bookseller
- Robert Gould (poet) (c. 1660–1708/9), English poet
- Robert Gould (set decorator), American set decorator
- Robert E. Gould (1924–1998), American psychiatrist
- Robert S. Gould (1826–1904), chief justice of the Texas Supreme Court
- Robert Freke Gould (1836–1915), soldier, barrister, Freemason and Masonic historian

== See also ==
- Bobbie Goulding (born 1972), English rugby league footballer and coach
- Bobbie Goulding Jr. (born 1993), his son, English rugby league footballer
- Bobby Gould in Hell, a 1989 play by David Mamet
- Robert Goulet (1933–2007), entertainer
