= Frances Maloney =

Frances Maloney may be a misspelling of:

- Frances Moloney (1873–1959), Irish socialite, later Sister Mary Patrick of the Missionary Sisters of St. Columban
- Francis Maloney (disambiguation) various people
