= Sodje =

Sodje is the name of several people:

- Akpo Sodje, English footballer
- Bright Sodje, Nigerian rugby player
- Efe Sodje, footballer
- Onome Sodje, Nigerian footballer
- Sam Sodje, footballer
