= Millie Boyle =

Australia dual-code international rugby footballer (born 1998)

Millie Elliott
Personal information
- Born: Millie Boyle; 19 May 1998 (age 28) Cobargo, New South Wales, Australia
- Height: 181 cm (5 ft 11 in)
- Weight: 83 kg (13 st 1 lb)

Playing information

Rugby union
- Position: Flanker
Club
Years	Team	Pld	T	G	FG	P
2019	Queensland Reds	6	1	0	0	5
Representative
Years	Team	Pld	T	G	FG	P
2016–19	Australia

Rugby league
- Position: Prop
Club
Years	Team	Pld	T	G	FG	P
2019–21	Brisbane Broncos	13	4	0	0	16
2022	Newcastle Knights	7	1	0	0	4
2023–	Sydney Roosters	31	5	0	0	20
	Total	51	10	0	0	40
Representative
Years	Team	Pld	T	G	FG	P
2019–26	New South Wales	12	0	0	0	0
2019–26	Australia	8	0	0	0	0
2019	Australia 9s	3	0	0	0	0
- Source: RLP As of 17 November 2026
- Spouse: Adam Elliott
- Father: David Boyle
- Relatives: Morgan Boyle (brother); Jason Croker (uncle); Lachlan Croker (cousin)

Millie Elliott (née Boyle) (born 19 May 1998) is an Australian professional rugby league footballer who currently plays for the Sydney Roosters in the NRL Women's Premiership. Her position is prop.

Elliott previously played rugby union as a flanker. She is a dual-code international, having played for both the Australian Jillaroos and Australian Wallaroos. In the NRLW, she has won two premierships with the Brisbane Broncos, one premiership with the Newcastle Knights and two premierships with the Sydney Roosters.

== Family Players ==
Born in Cobargo, New South Wales, Elliott’s father, David, and her uncle, Jason Croker, were professional rugby league players for the Canberra Raiders. Her brother, Morgan, and her cousin, Lachlan Croker, play for the Manly Warringah Sea Eagles. Until the age of 12, she played rugby league with girls.

== Playing career ==
=== Rugby union ===
When Elliott was at school, she began playing rugby union. In high school, she played for the ACT Brumbies schoolgirls team. When Bond University Rugby Club offered her a playing position in the University rugby sevens league, she moved from her native Canberra to the Gold Coast.

In the National Women's Rugby Championship, Boyle played for the ACT Brumbies, making her debut in 2016. At the age of 19, she was called up to the Australia women's national rugby union team, known as the Wallaroos, for the 2017 Women's Rugby World Cup in Ireland. Elliott was the youngest player to be selected. She had impressed while playing for the team in the Four Nations tournament, which the Walleroos officials stated was the reason for her selection at the World Cup.

In 2019, she played for the Queensland Reds Super Rugby team.

=== Rugby league ===
In 2019, Elliott returned to rugby league, joining the Burleigh Bears in the South East Queensland women's division. In May 2019, she represented South East Queensland at the NRL Women's National Championships. On 21 June 2019, she made her debut for New South Wales in its 14–4 win over Queensland. In July 2019, she signed with the Brisbane Broncos NRL Women's Premiership team.

In Round 1 of the 2019 NRL Women's season, Elliott made her debut for the Broncos in their 14–4 win over the St George Illawarra Dragons. On 6 October 2019, she started at prop in the Broncos' 30–6 Grand Final win over the Dragons.

In October 2019, she represented Australia at the World Cup 9s tournament. On 25 October 2019, she made her Test debut for Australia in its 28–8 win over New Zealand.

On 25 October 2020, she started at prop in the Broncos' 20–10 Grand Final win over the Sydney Roosters.

On 18 May 2022, the Newcastle Knights announced the signing of Boyle and Tamika Upton ahead of the 2022 NRL Women's season.

Elliott made her club debut for the Knights in round 1 of the 2022 NRLW season against her former club the Brisbane Broncos.

In late September 2022, Elliott was named in the Dream Team announced by the Rugby League Players Association. The team was selected by the players, who each cast one vote for each position.

On 2 October 2022, Elliott captained the Knights in their 32–12 NRLW Grand Final win over the Parramatta Eels.

In 2023, she joined the Sydney Roosters.

On 6 October 2024, Elliott started at prop in their 32–28 NRLW Grand Final win over the Cronulla Sharks.

== Controversy ==
On 26 August 2021, Elliott was sanctioned by the NRL after an alleged incident with her future husband Adam Elliott, who was then a Canterbury-Bankstown player.

Millie Elliott was alleged to have met Adam Elliott at a Gold Coast restaurant, where the pair entered the men's toilet and started kissing, with Adam Elliott removing his shirt, before both were ordered to leave the premises.

Millie Elliott was issued a warning by the NRL for her conduct, and was given education and training regarding the obligations of NRL and NRLW players in public, while Adam Elliott was deemed to be the instigator and was fined $10,000 for failing to comply with biosecurity protocols (related to Covid-19) and bringing the game into disrepute.

== Achievements and accolades ==
=== Individual ===
- NRLW Rookie of the Year: 2019
- Brisbane Broncos Best Forward: 2019

=== Team ===
- 2019 NRLW Grand Final: Brisbane Broncos – Winners
- 2020 NRLW Grand Final: Brisbane Broncos – Winners
- 2022 NRLW Grand Final: Newcastle Knights – Winners
- 2024 NRLW Grand Final: Sydney Roosters – Winners
- 2026 NRLW Grand Final: Sydney Roosters - Winners

=== Representative ===
- Rugby League World Cup Champion: 2026

=== Personal ===
Passed SAS Australia Season 3 course, along with Riana Crehan and Darius Boyd in 2022.
