= Morgan Boyle =

Australian rugby league footballer

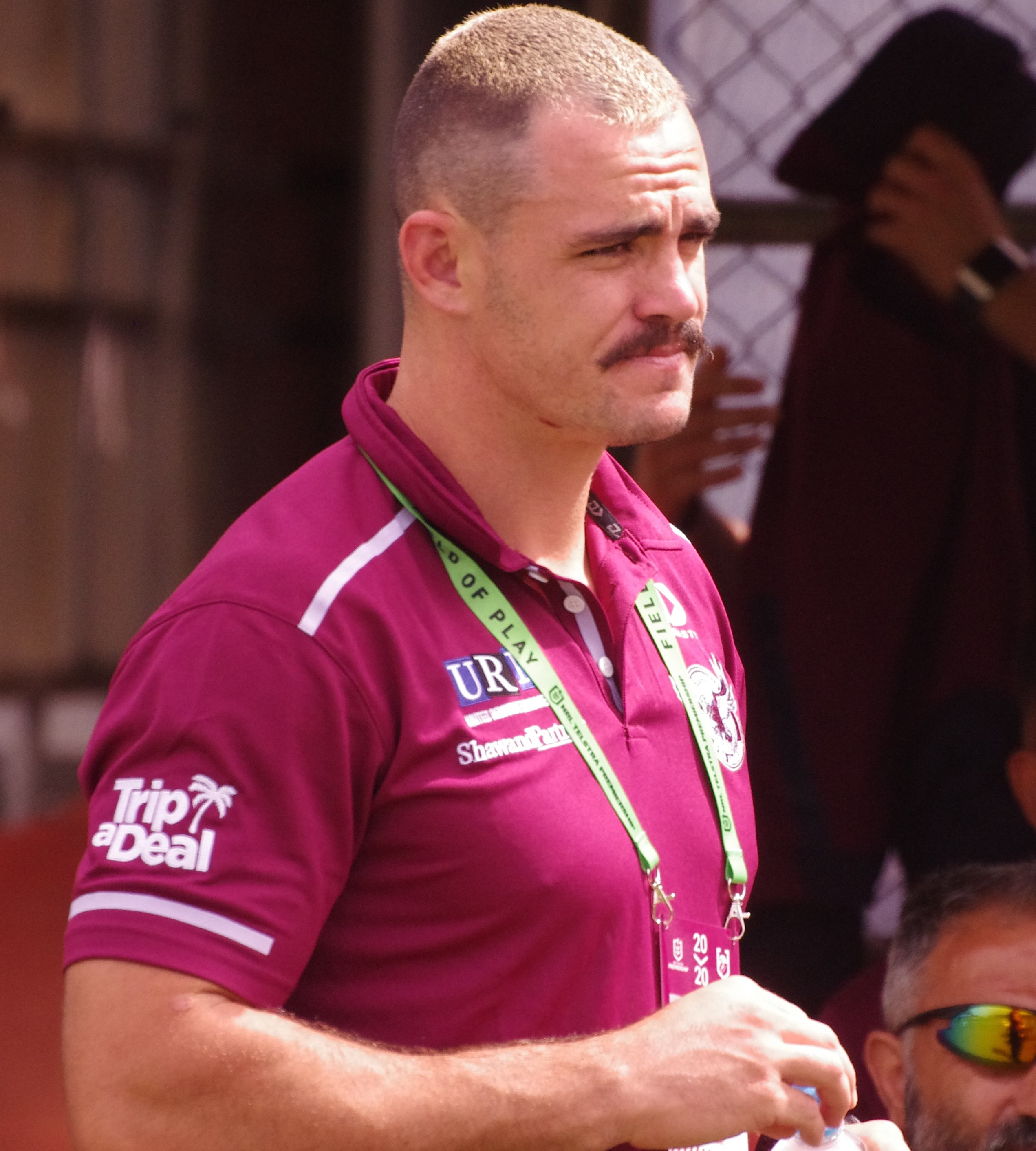

Personal information
- Born: 17 July 1996 (age 30) Bega, New South Wales, Australia
- Height: 194 cm (6 ft 4 in)
- Weight: 111 kg (17 st 7 lb)

Playing information
- Position: Prop, Second-row
Club
Years	Team	Pld	T	G	FG	P
2017–19	Gold Coast Titans	23	1	0	0	4
2019–23	Manly Sea Eagles	27	0	0	0	0
	Total	50	1	0	0	4
- Source: As of 2 April 2021
- Father: David Boyle
- Relatives: Millie Boyle (sister); Jason Croker (uncle); Lachlan Croker (cousin)

Morgan Boyle (born 17 July 1996) is a former Australian professional rugby league footballer who played as a prop and second-row forward for the Manly Warringah Sea Eagles and the Gold Coast Titans in the National Rugby League (NRL).

== Background ==
Boyle was born in Bega, New South Wales, Australia. He is the son of former Canberra Raiders player David Boyle, brother of dual international Millie Boyle and nephew of Australian international Jason Croker.

Boyle played his junior rugby league for Cobargo Eels, before being signed by the Canberra Raiders.

== Playing career ==
=== Early career ===
In 2014 and 2015, Boyle played for the Canberra Raiders' NYC team.

In 2016, he joined the Gold Coast Titans and started playing for their NYC team.

=== 2017 ===
In 2017, Boyle graduated to the Titans' Queensland Cup team, Tweed Heads Seagulls. In round 6 of the 2017 NRL season, he made his NRL debut for the Titans against his former club the Raiders.

=== 2018 ===
In round 5 of the 2018 NRL season, Boyle scored his first NRL try for the Gold Coast in the 32-20 win over the Manly-Warringah Sea Eagles at Marley Brown Oval.

=== 2019 ===
Boyle made his first appearance for Manly-Warringah after leaving the Gold Coast mid-season in round 6 of the 2019 NRL season against St George, coming off the bench in a 12-10 loss at WIN Stadium.

=== 2020 ===
Boyle was limited to only seven matches for Manly-Warringah in the 2020 NRL season as the club missed out on the finals finishing 13th.

=== 2021 ===
On 5 April, it was announced that Boyle would miss the remainder of the 2021 NRL season with a shoulder injury.

=== 2022 ===
Boyle made only one appearance for Manly in the 2022 NRL season which was against the Sydney Roosters in round 20 of the competition.
