= Francis Maloney =

Francis Maloney may refer to:

- Francis Maloney (rugby league) (born 1973), English rugby league player
- Francis T. Maloney (1894–1945), American politician; U.S. Representative from Connecticut

== See also ==
- Frank Maloney (disambiguation)
- Frances Moloney (1873–1959) Irish socialite, later Sister Mary Patrick of the Missionary Sisters of St. Columban
