= Adam Maher (rugby league) =

Australian rugby league player (1972–2020)

Personal information
- Born: 2 August 1972 Australia
- Died: 25 February 2020 (aged 47)

Playing information
- Position: Second-row
Club
Years	Team	Pld	T	G	FG	P
1994-96	Cronulla Sharks	43	1?	0	0	4
1998	Rochdale Hornets	1	0	0	0	0
1999	Gateshead Thunder	26	3	0	0	12
2000–03	Hull FC	100	25	0	0	100
	Total	170		0	0	116

Adam Maher (2 August 1972 – 25 February 2020) was an Australian professional rugby league player. Between 1994 and 1996, he played 43 games for the Cronulla Sharks. Four years later, Maher started a playing career in the United Kingdom, representing Rochdale Hornets (1998), Gateshead Thunder (1999) and most notably Hull FC (2000–03). During his time at Hull, he made 100 appearances for the Super League club, scoring 25 tries.

In late 2018, Maher was diagnosed with motor neurone disease. He died on 25 February 2020, at the age of 47.
