= Andy Fisher (rugby league) =

English rugby league footballer and coach

Personal information
- Full name: Andrew Fisher
- Born: 17 November 1967 (age 57)

Playing information
- Position: Prop, Second-row
Club
Years	Team	Pld	T	G	FG	P
1989–92	Featherstone Rovers	61+39	26	0	0	104
1992–94	Castleford	23	1	0	0	4
1994–95	Dewsbury Rams	32	14	0	0	56
1995–97	Hull FC	64	19	0	0	76
1998–00	Wakefield Trinity (Wildcats)	67	11	0	0	44
2001–04	Dewsbury Rams	42	9	0	0	36
2005	Barrow Raiders	7	2	0	0	8
	Total	335	82	0	0	328

Coaching information
Club
Years	Team	Gms	W	D	L	W%
2001–03	Dewsbury Rams	18	2	1	15	11

Andrew Fisher (born 17 November 1967) is a former professional rugby league footballer who played in the 1980s, 1990s and 2000s, and coached in the 2000s. He played at club level for Featherstone Rovers, Castleford, Dewsbury Rams (two spells), Hull FC, Wakefield Trinity (Wildcats) and the Barrow Raiders, as a prop or second-row, and coached at club level for the Dewsbury Rams, Sharlston Rovers and the Eastmoor Dragons.

== Playing career ==
=== County Cup Final appearances ===
Andy Fisher appeared as a substitute (replacing second-row Glen Booth) in Featherstone Rovers' 14-20 defeat by Bradford Northern in the 1989 Yorkshire Cup Final during the 1989–90 season at Headingley, Leeds on Sunday 5 November 1989.

=== First Division Grand Final appearances ===
Andy Fisher was a substitute in Wakefield Trinity's 24-22 victory over Featherstone Rovers in the 1998 First Division Grand Final at McAlpine Stadium, Huddersfield on Saturday 26 September 1998.

=== Financial crisis at Wakefield Trinity Wildcats ===
In 2000, at the height of a financial crisis at Wakefield Trinity Wildcats, the contracts of all players aged over 24 were terminated during September 2000. The players affected were; Andy Fisher, Bobbie Goulding, Warren Jowitt, Tony Kemp (player-coach), Steve McNamara, Francis Maloney, Martin Masella, Steve Prescott, Bright Sodje, Francis Stephenson, and Glen Tomlinson.

=== Club career ===
Andy Fisher made his début for Featherstone Rovers on Sunday 3 September 1989.
