= Francis Stephenson =

England international rugby league footballer

Personal information
- Full name: Francis Stephenson
- Born: 20 January 1976 (age 50) Dewsbury, West Yorkshire, England

Playing information
- Height: 6 ft 2 in (1.88 m)
- Weight: 17 st 0 lb (108 kg)
- Position: prop
Club
Years	Team	Pld	T	G	FG	P
1993–2000	Wakefield Trinity	125	6	0	0	24
2000–01	Wigan Warriors	11	0	0	0	0
2001–04	London Broncos	83	5	0	0	20
2004–06	Hull Kingston Rovers	17	1	0	0	4
	Total	236	12	0	0	48
Representative
Years	Team	Pld	T	G	FG	P
2000–00	England	3	1	0	0	4
- Father: Nigel Stephenson

Francis Stephenson (born 20 January 1976) is an English former professional rugby league footballer who played in the 1990s and 2000s, and was the operations director at the Wakefield Trinity Wildcats.

== Playing career ==
Francis played his early rugby at Dewsbury Moor, and impressed enough to represent England schools in 1992. His most memorable career moment came at Wakefield Trinity, when he played at prop and scored the match winning try in Wakefield Trinity's 24–22 victory over Featherstone Rovers in the 1998 First Division Grand Final at McAlpine Stadium, Huddersfield on 26 September 1998, a try that ultimately took Wakefield Trinity into Super League.

In 2000, at the height of a financial crisis at Wakefield Trinity Wildcats, the contracts of all players aged over 24 were terminated during September 2000. The players affected were; Andy Fisher, Bobbie Goulding, Warren Jowitt, Tony Kemp (player-coach), Steve McNamara, Francis Maloney, Martin Masella, Steve Prescott, Bright Sodje, Francis Stephenson, and Glen Tomlinson.

Francis enjoyed two exceptional seasons in Super League, which resulted in selection for the England World Cup squad in 2000. A transfer to Wigan Warriors on the back of these fine performances followed but his period at the JJB was hindered by injury problems.

A move to London Broncos came in 2002 and Stephenson soon established himself as a prominent member of the Broncos pack.

In late 2005, Hull Kingston Rovers signed Francis Stephenson from the London Broncos. Stephenson, who had served as club captain, agreed to a two-year contract. He is known for his role in team coordination and his leadership within the squad and the locker room.

He retired from playing during the 2007 close season, after playing in Hull Kingston Rovers' promotion season in National League One.

== Post-playing ==
Soon after retiring he took up the role of general manager at Wakefield Trinity Wildcats, following the departure of the previous chief executive.

Within months of this appointment, he was also instated as team manager of the England U18s team on their 2008 tour of Australia.

== Personal life ==
Francis Stephenson is the son of the rugby league footballer who played in the 1960s, 1970s and 1980s, and coached in the 1980s and 1990s; Nigel Stephenson.
