= Martin Masella =

Former Tonga international rugby league footballer

Personal information
- Full name: Martin Masella
- Born: 4 November 1969 (age 56) ʻEua, Tonga

Playing information
- Height: 6 ft 1 in (1.85 m)
- Weight: 98 kg (15 st 6 lb)
- Position: Prop, Second-row, Lock
Club
Years	Team	Pld	T	G	FG	P
1991–94	Balmain Tigers	71	3	0	0	12
1995	Illawarra Steelers	10	2	0	0	8
1996	South Sydney	17	0	0	0	0
1998–99	Leeds Rhinos	77	4	0	0	16
2000	Wakefield Trinity Wildcats	24	4	0	0	16
2001	Warrington Wolves	27	5	0	0	20
	Total	226	18	0	0	72
Representative
Years	Team	Pld	T	G	FG	P
1995–00	Tonga	5	1	0	0	4

Martin Masella (born 4 November 1969) is a Tongan former professional rugby league footballer who played in the 1990s and 2000s. He was a Tonga international and played at the 1995 Rugby League World Cup. Masella played for the Leeds Rhinos as a prop in their 1998 Super League Grand Final defeat by the Wigan Warriors. Masella captained Tonga in the 2000 Rugby League World Cup.

== Background ==
Masella was born to factory workers.

== Playing career ==
Masella played in Australia for Balmain Tigers, Illawarra Steelers and South Sydney before moving to England to play in the Super League for the Leeds Rhinos. He was later awarded Leeds Rhinos heritage player number 1291. After leaving the Rhinos, Masella played for Wakefield Trinity Wildcats and Warrington Wolves.

In September 2000, at the height of a financial crisis at the Wakefield Trinity Wildcats, the contracts of all players aged over 24 were terminated. The players affected were; Andy Fisher, Bobbie Goulding, Warren Jowitt, Tony Kemp (player-coach), Steve McNamara, Francis Maloney, Martin Masella, Steve Prescott, Bright Sodje, Francis Stephenson and Glen Tomlinson. Masella was one of a group of players who were awarded compensation from an industrial tribunal as a result of the dismissal.

Masella came out of retirement to play for Tonga against Cumbria at the age of 36.
