= Glen Tomlinson =

Australian rugby league footballer

Personal information
- Full name: Glen Tomlinson
- Born: 18 March 1970 (age 55); Redcliffe, Queensland, Australia

Playing information
- Position: Five-eighth, Halfback
Club
| Years | Team | Pld | T | G | FG | P |
|---|---|---|---|---|---|---|
| 1991–96 | Batley Bulldogs | 143 | 91 | 0 | 3 | 367 |
| 1996–97 | Bradford Bulls | 53 | 17 | 0 | 0 | 68 |
| 1998 | Hull Sharks | 8 | 1 | 0 | 0 | 4 |
| 1999–00 | Wakefield Trinity Wildcats | 50 | 8 | 0 | 0 | 32 |
| 2001–02 | Batley Bulldogs | 65 | 33 | 0 | 3 | 135 |
| | Total | 319 | 150 | 0 | 6 | 606 |

Glen Tomlinson (born 18 March 1970) is an Australian former professional rugby league footballer who played in the 1990s and 2000s. He played at club level for Batley Bulldogs (two spells), Bradford Bulls, Hull FC and Wakefield Trinity Wildcats as a five-eighth or halfback. A stand at Batley Bulldogs' ground, Mount Pleasant is named after Glen Tomlinson.

== Playing career ==
=== Batley ===
Born in Redcliffe, Queensland, Tomlinson began his rugby league career with his hometown club, Redcliffe Dolphins. He moved to England in 1991, signing for Batley. He scored 124 tries during his two spells with Batley, breaking the Batley club record for tries in a career, which had been set by Wattie Davies way back in 1912, who had scored 122 tries in 448 matches. He held the record until 2006, when he was surpassed by Craig Lingard.

=== Bradford Bulls ===
In January 1996, Tomlinson was signed by Bradford Bulls in an exchange deal, with three Bradford players (Phil Hardwick, Dave Turpin and Roger Simpson) moving to Batley.

He played in the 1997 Challenge Cup final defeat against St Helens.

=== Wakefield Trinity Wildcats ===
In 2000, at the height of a financial crisis at Wakefield Trinity Wildcats, the contracts of all players aged over 24 were terminated during September 2000. The players affected were; Andy Fisher, Bobbie Goulding, Warren Jowitt, Tony Kemp (player-coach), Steve McNamara, Francis Maloney, Martin Masella, Steve Prescott, Bright Sodje, Francis Stephenson and Glen Tomlinson.

He returned to Batley, where he finished his career, and was named Northern Ford Premiership Player of the Year in 2002.
