= Dominic Maloney =

English rugby league footballer

Personal information
- Full name: Dominic Maloney
- Born: 12 March 1987 (age 38) Castleford, West Yorkshire, England

Playing information
- Height: 6 ft 1 in (1.85 m)
- Position: Prop
Club
Years	Team	Pld	T	G	FG	P
2005	Castleford Tigers	2	0	0	0	0
2006–08	Dewsbury Rams	74	7	0	0	28
2009	Hull F.C.	7	0	0	0	0
2009(loan)	→ Halifax	10	1	0	0	4
2010	Halifax	20	3	0	0	12
2012	Featherstone Rovers	24	3	0	0	12
2014–16	Hemel Stags	22	0	0	0	0
	Total	159	14	0	0	56
- Relatives: Francis Maloney (uncle)

Dominic "Dom" Maloney (born 12 March 1987), also known by the nickname of "Big Dom", is an English rugby league footballer who has played in the 2000s and 2010s. He has played at club level for the Castleford Tigers, in National League One for Dewsbury Rams, in 2009's Super League XIV for Hull F.C., in the Co-operative Championship for Halifax (two spells, including the first on loan from Hull F.C.), Featherstone Rovers, and the Hemel Stags (2014 and 2016), as a prop.

== Background ==
Dom Maloney was born in Castleford, West Yorkshire, England, and he joined the Parachute Regiment c. 2013.

== Playing career ==
=== Club career ===
Dom Maloney made his début for Featherstone Rovers on Sunday 4 March 2012.

=== Club career ===
Dom Maloney is the grandson of the rugby league centre who played in the 1960s and 1970s for Hull F.C. scoring 1462-points; John Maloney.
