= Frank Maloney (disambiguation) =

Frank Maloney may refer to:

- Kellie Maloney (birth name Frank; born 1953), British boxing promoter
- Frank Maloney (American football) (1940-2020), American football player and coach

== See also ==
- Francis Maloney (disambiguation)
