= Brett Green =

Australian rugby league footballer

Personal information
- Full name: Brett Green
- Born: 11 March 1972 (age 54) Roma, Queensland.

Playing information
- Position: Second-row, Prop
Club
Years	Team	Pld	T	G	FG	P
1995–96	Brisbane Broncos	27	0	0	0	0
1997	Perth Reds	18	0	0	0	0
1999	Gateshead Thunder	12	0	0	0	0
	Total	57	0	0	0	0
- Source: As of 26 November 2024

Brett Green is an Australian former professional rugby league footballer who played in the 1990s. He played for Brisbane and the Perth Reds in the Australian Rugby League/Super League competitions and for Gateshead in the Super League.

== Playing career ==
Green made his first grade debut for Brisbane in round 13 of the 1995 ARL season against Parramatta with Brisbane winning the match 60-14 at Parramatta Stadium. Green would play four further matches with the club in his debut season including two finals games against Canberra and Canterbury which both ended in defeat. The following year, Green played 22 games for Brisbane as they qualified for the finals. Green played in both finals matches against North Sydney and Cronulla which Brisbane both lost in. In 1997, Green joined the Super League aligned Perth Reds outfit. Green played 18 games for the club including their final ever match against Canberra which ended in a 36–16 loss.

After the Perth Reds were liquidated, Green joined the newly formed Gateshead side in England. Green played 12 games for Gateshead in their one and only season as a club. Following the end of the 1999 season, Gateshead folded with debts of around £750,000 and merged with Hull F.C., however Green returned to Australia and retired.
