= Bright Sodje =

English rugby league footballer

Personal information
- Full name: Bright Sodje
- Born: 21 April 1966 (age 60)
- Height: 6 ft 5 in (1.96 m)

Playing information

Rugby league
- Position: Wing
Club
Years	Team	Pld	T	G	FG	P
1990–94	Hull Kingston Rovers	81	36	0	0	144
1994	Wakefield Trinity	9	4	0	0	16
1994–99	Sheffield Eagles	108	55	0	0	220
2000	Wakefield Trinity Wildcats	16	4	0	0	16
2001	Hull Kingston Rovers	12	3	0	0	12
2001	Sheffield Eagles	4	2	0	0	8
2004	Sheffield Eagles	10	3	0	0	12
	Total	240	107	0	0	428

Rugby union
Club
Years	Team	Pld	T	G	FG	P
	Wakefield RFC
- As of 22 May 2021
- Relatives: Akpo Sodje (brother); Efe Sodje (brother); Onome Sodje (nephew); Sam Sodje (brother); Tai Sodje (son)

Bright Ojamohare Sodje (born 21 April 1966) is a retired dual-code rugby player, who played for rugby league clubs; the Wakefield Trinity (Wildcats), Hull Kingston Rovers, and the Sheffield Eagles in England as well as rugby union for Wakefield RFC.

Sodje's brothers, Sam, Efe, Akpo, Steve, and his nephew, Onome, have all played professional football in England.

Bright was a winger with a reputation for scoring tries, and noted for his aeroplane style celebration.

== Financial Crisis at Wakefield Trinity Wildcats ==
In 2000, at the height of a financial crisis at Wakefield Trinity Wildcats, the contracts of all players aged over 24 were terminated during September 2000. The players affected were; Andy Fisher, Bobbie Goulding, Warren Jowitt, Tony Kemp (player-coach), Steve McNamara, Francis Maloney, Martin Masella, Steve Prescott, Bright Sodje, Francis Stephenson and Glen Tomlinson.

== Personal life ==
In September 2017, Bright was sentenced to 21 months in prison for fraud, having – with his brothers Efe and Stephen – siphoned off money from a charity, the Sodje Sports Foundation.

His son, Tai, is a professional footballer, and currently plays for the academy team of Manchester City.
