= Gateshead Thunder (1999) =

English rugby league club

Club information
- Colours: White, Purple, Yellow
- Founded: 1999
- Exited: 1999 (merged into Hull F.C.)

Former details
- Ground: Thunderdome (11,800)
- Captain: Kerrod Walters
- Competition: Super League
- 1999: 6th

Gateshead Thunder was a professional rugby league club founded in 1999 in Gateshead, Tyne and Wear, England, which competed in the 1999 Super League but then merged with Hull Sharks after only one season. To retain rugby league in Gateshead, a new Gateshead Thunder club (now Newcastle Thunder) played in Gateshead from 2001 until 2014.

== History ==
The club was formed by Kath Hetherington and Shane Richardson at an initial cost of £500,000 with sponsors Northern Electric & Gas reportedly investing a similar amount "over three years."

Hetherington previously founded Sheffield Eagles with her husband Gary Hetherington. After selling her shares in Sheffield Eagles in 1996, Hetherington invested in the new club citing the potential for rugby league expansion in the North East.

In 1998, Gateshead was officially granted a franchise in the Super League ahead of bids from Swansea, Northampton, and Cardiff. The club was named Gateshead Thunder, the name chosen in a contest, with Shaun McRae as head coach. The team played at Gateshead International Stadium, which they called the Thunderdome.

Fan attendance in the early part of the season was poor but rose to 3,895 by the season's end. Gateshead Thunder finished in sixth position, just two points outside the playoff places. They had defeated St. Helens home and away, as well as beating Wigan Warriors in the 'on the road' fixture at Tynecastle, Edinburgh. Matt Daylight was the joint leading try scorer in Super League IV and winger Ian Herron was one of the leading goal-kickers in the league.

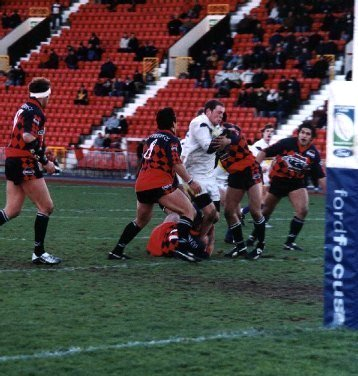
Gateshead Thunder (new club) match, 2004

During their sole season in Super League in 1999, the Thunder claimed to have lost £700,000, so on 15 November 1999, the board announced their intention to merge the Thunder with the Hull Sharks, for which they were paid £1.25 million by Super League Europe. The Association of Premiership Clubs blocked attempts for the newly merged company to enter a separate Hull-based team in the Northern Ford Premiership and so the new club would be called 'Hull FC' and play all their home games in Hull itself. The 'merger' has since been accepted to be a simple takeover of Thunder by Hull F.C. to allow them to retain their Super League status.

Fans of the original Gateshead club who were opposed to the merger established Thunderstorm, a grassroots organization to keep the clubs separate. Although this ultimately proved to be unsuccessful, the degree of local fan support resulted in the formation of a new Gateshead Thunder club. The new Gateshead Thunder was accepted to play in the Northern Ford Premiership for the 2001 season.

== Results ==
=== Season summary ===
Season (As Gateshead Thunder)	League										Challenge Cup
Season (As Gateshead Thunder)	Division	P	W	D	L	F	A	Pts	Pos	Play-offs	Challenge Cup
1999	Super League	30	19	1	10	775	576	39	6th	Did not qualify	Did not participate

=== 1999 season ===
Date	Opposition	Venue	Result	Attendance
7 March	Leeds Rhinos	H	L 14-24	5,960
21 March	St Helens	A	L 22-34	5,910
2 April	Wakefield Trinity	H	W 24-6	3,460
5 April	Warrington Wolves	A	L 18-23	4,919
10 April	Halifax Blue Sox	H	W 22-14	2,340
18 April	Castleford Tigers	A	W 17-14	6,489
25 April	Salford Reds	H	W 38-14	1,760
3 May	Huddersfield Giants	H	W 36-10	2,616
9 May	Wigan Warriors	A	L 13-16	7,717
16 May	Bradford Bulls	H	L 12-22	6,631
19 May	Hull Sharks	H	W 25-6	1,580
23 May	London Broncos	A	D 18-18	1,788
30 May	Sheffield Eagles	H	W 26-18	1,800
4 June	Leeds Rhinos	A	L 14-32	10,821
13 June	St Helens	H	W 32-20	6,220
20 June	Wakefield Trinity	A	W 22-18	3,247
25 June	Warrington Wolves	H	W 26-20	3,457
29 June	Sheffield Eagles	A	W 23-6	3,000
4 July	Halifax Blue Sox	A	L 14-35	3,305
11 July	Castleford Tigers	H	W 24-16	6,108
18 July	Salford Reds	A	W 31-18	5,611
25 July	Huddersfield Giants	A	W 40-16	2,219
1 August	Wigan Warriors	H	W 20-16	4,978
4 August	Hull Sharks	A	W 40-12	3,321
8 August	Bradford Bulls	A	L 14-30	12,492
15 August	London Broncos	H	L 22-28	2,631
22 August	Leeds Rhinos	H	L 18-30	5,498
30 August	St Helens	A	W 36-32	5,993
5 September	Wakefield Trinity	H	W 66-6	3,286
12 September	Warrington Wolves	A	W 48-22	4,834

== Coach ==
- Shaun McRae

== Players ==
- Richard Allwood
- Sean Allwood
- Deon Bird
- Brian Carney
- Garreth Carvell
- Steve Collins
- Ben Sammut
- Craig Simon
- Stuart Singleton
- Will Robinson
- Matthew Daylight
- Luke Felsch
- Brett Green
- Tony Grimaldi
- Brett Grogan
- Ian Herron
- Andrew Hick
- Russell Hugill
- Mick Jenkins
- Danny Lee
- Adam Maher
- David Maiden
- Danny McAllister
- Steve O'Neill
- Willie Peters
- Kerrod Walters
- Craig Wilson

== See also ==
- Rugby Football League expansion
