= Bobbie Goulding Jr. =

English rugby league footballer

Bobbie Goulding
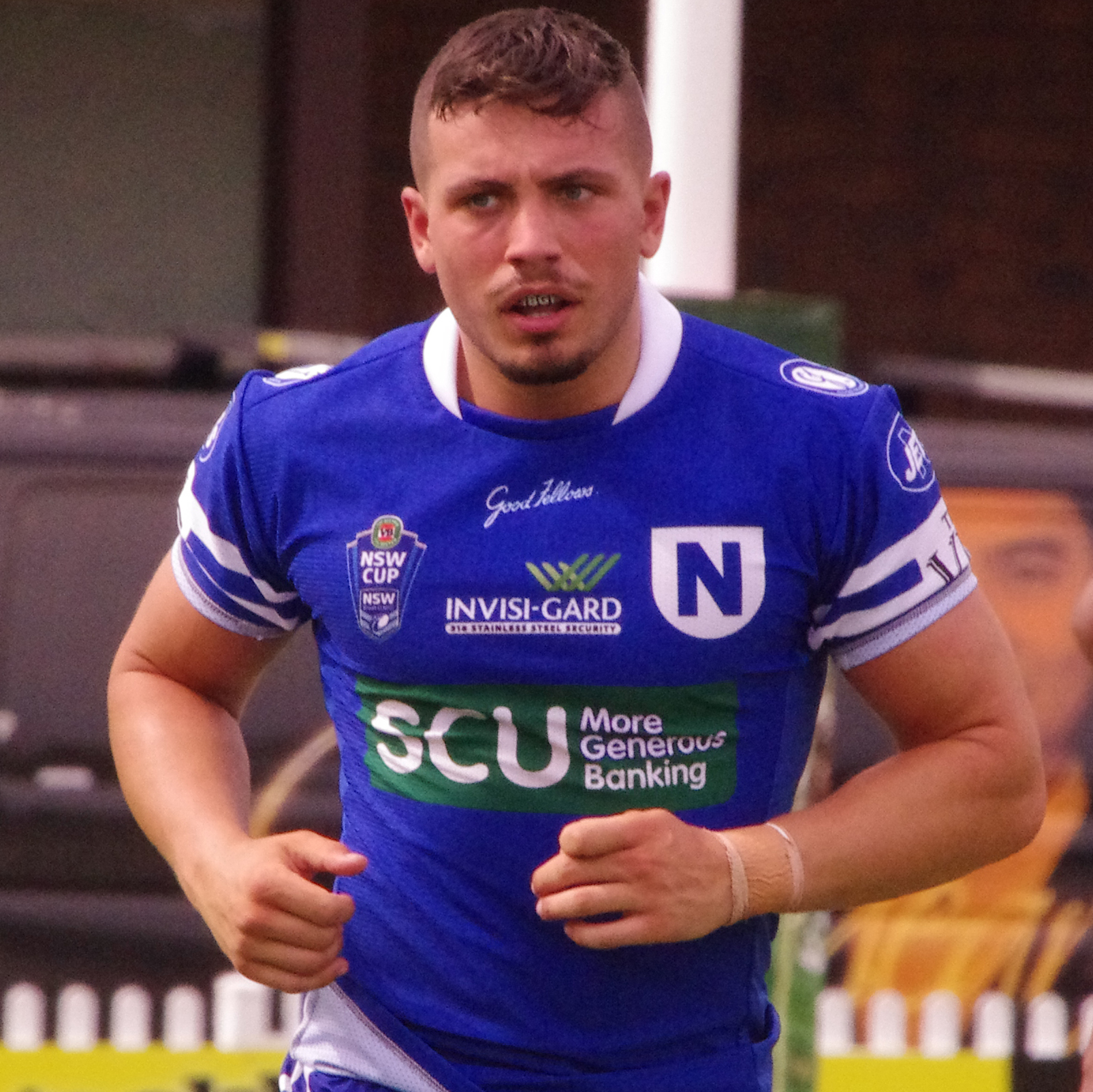

Personal information
- Full name: Bobbie Goulding Junior
- Born: 4 March 1993 (age 33)

Playing information
- Position: Scrum-half
Club
Years	Team	Pld	T	G	FG	P
2013	Wakefield Trinity	3	0	1	0	2
2014–	Sydney Roosters	0	0	0	0	0
	Total	3	0	1	0	2
- Father: Bobbie Goulding

Bobbie Goulding Jr. (born 4 March 1993) is a professional rugby league footballer who has played in the 2010s. He has played at club level for the Dewsbury Rams, in the Super League for the Wakefield Trinity Wildcats, in the Canterbury Cup NSW for the Newtown Jets, and the Thatto Heath Crusaders, as scrum-half.

== Genealogical information ==
Bobbie Goulding Jr. is the son of the rugby league footballer and coach Bobbie Goulding.
