= Francis Maloney (rugby league) =

England international rugby league footballer

Personal information
- Full name: Francis John Maloney
- Born: 26 May 1973 (age 52) Dewsbury, England

Playing information
- Height: 5 ft 8 in (1.73 m)
- Weight: 13 st 11 lb (88 kg)
- Position: Centre, Stand-off
Club
Years	Team	Pld	T	G	FG	P
1990–92	Leeds	3	0	1	0	2
1993–94	Featherstone Rovers	35	17	23	2	116
1994–95	Warrington	20	4	0	0	16
1995–97	Oldham Bears	65	21	153	3	393
1998–99	Castleford Tigers	54	21	24	0	132
2000	Wakefield Trinity Wildcats	13	2	1	0	10
2001–02	Salford City Reds	48	26	5	0	114
2003–04	Castleford Tigers	32	5	11	3	45
2005–07	Dewsbury Rams	64	27	233	3	577
2007–08	Batley Bulldogs	17	3	42	3	99
2008	Hunslet Hawks	5	1	0	0	4
	Total	356	127	493	14	1508
Representative
Years	Team	Pld	T	G	FG	P
2001	Yorkshire	1	0	1	0	2
1999	England	2	2	0	0	8
- Relatives: Dominic Maloney (nephew)

Francis "Frank" Maloney (born 26 May 1973) is an English former professional rugby league footballer who played as a utility back, recognised for his ability to play in the halves and the back line. He played at the top tier of English rugby league for Leeds, Featherstone Rovers, Warrington, Oldham Bears, Castleford Tigers, Wakefield Trinity Wildcats, and Salford City Reds. He went on to play for Batley, Dewsbury Rams and the Hunslet Hawks in the Championship before retiring from playing in 2008.

== Playing career ==
=== International honours ===
Maloney won caps for England playing Centre i.e. number 3, in the 28–20 victory over France at Stade Albert Domec, Carcassonne stadium on 13 October 1999, and at centre, scoring two tries in the 50–20 victory over France, at Hull FC's stadium on 23 October 1999.

=== Regal Trophy Final appearances ===
Maloney played stand-off in Warrington's 10–40 defeat by Wigan in the 1994–95 Regal Trophy Final during the 1994–95 season at Alfred McAlpine Stadium, Huddersfield on Saturday 28 January 1995.

=== Division Two Premiership Final appearances ===
Maloney played stand-off, and scored a try in Featherstone Rovers' 20–16 victory over Workington Town in the 1992–93 Divisional Premiership Final during the 1992–93 season at Old Trafford, Manchester on 19 May 1993.

== Financial Crisis at Wakefield Trinity Wildcats ==
In September 2000, at the height of a financial crisis at Wakefield Trinity Wildcats, the contracts of all players aged over 24 were terminated. The players affected were; Andy Fisher, Bobbie Goulding, Warren Jowitt, Tony Kemp (player-coach), Steve McNamara, Francis Maloney, Martin Masella, Steve Prescott, Bright Sodje, Francis Stephenson and Glen Tomlinson.

== Personal life ==
Maloney is the son of the rugby league footballer who played in the 1960s and 1970s; John Maloney. Maloney is the uncle of the rugby league footballer Dominic Maloney. He lives in Dewsbury, Yorkshire.
