= Warren Jowitt =

English rugby league footballer and coach

Personal information
- Full name: Warren Scott Jowitt
- Born: 9 September 1974 (age 51) Wakefield, West Yorkshire, England

Playing information
- Height: 6 ft 2 in (1.88 m)
- Position: Prop, Second-row, Loose forward
Club
Years	Team	Pld	T	G	FG	P
1993–95	Hunslet Hawks	28	3	0	0	12
1995–99	Bradford Bulls	53	8	0	0	32
2000	Wakefield Trinity Wildcats	24	8	0	0	32
2001–02	Salford City Reds	21	4	0	0	16
2003	Hull FC	2	0	0	0	0
2005–06	Dewsbury Rams	49	10	0	0	40
	Total	177	33	0	0	132

Coaching information
Club
Years	Team	Gms	W	D	L	W%
2008–12	Dewsbury Rams

Warren Jowitt (born 9 September 1974), also known by the nickname of "Woz", is an English former professional rugby league footballer who played in the 1990s and 2000s, Jowitt was known for his hard running and uncompromising defence and was a no-nonsense kind of player coached in the 2000s and 2010s.

== Background ==
Warren Jowitt was born in Wakefield, West Yorkshire, England.

His son Billy Jowitt is a rugby league footballer who plays for Hunslet in the RFL Championship.

== Playing career ==
He played at club level for the Stanley Rangers ARLFC, Hunslet Hawks, the Bradford Bulls, the Wakefield Trinity Wildcats, the Salford City Reds, Hull FC, and the Dewsbury Rams, as a prop, second-row, or loose forward,

=== Financial crisis at the Wakefield Trinity Wildcats ===
In 2000, at the height of a financial crisis at the Wakefield Trinity Wildcats, the contracts of all players aged over 24 were terminated during September 2000. The players affected were; Andy Fisher, Bobbie Goulding, Warren Jowitt, Tony Kemp (player-coach), Steve McNamara, Francis Maloney, Martin Masella, Steve Prescott, Bright Sodje, Francis Stephenson, and Glen Tomlinson.

== Coaching career ==
He has coached at club level for Dewsbury Rams, and France (assistant) and only the second coach in the game to achieve an undefeated season.
