= Gateshead International Stadium =

Arena in Felling, Tyne and Wear, England

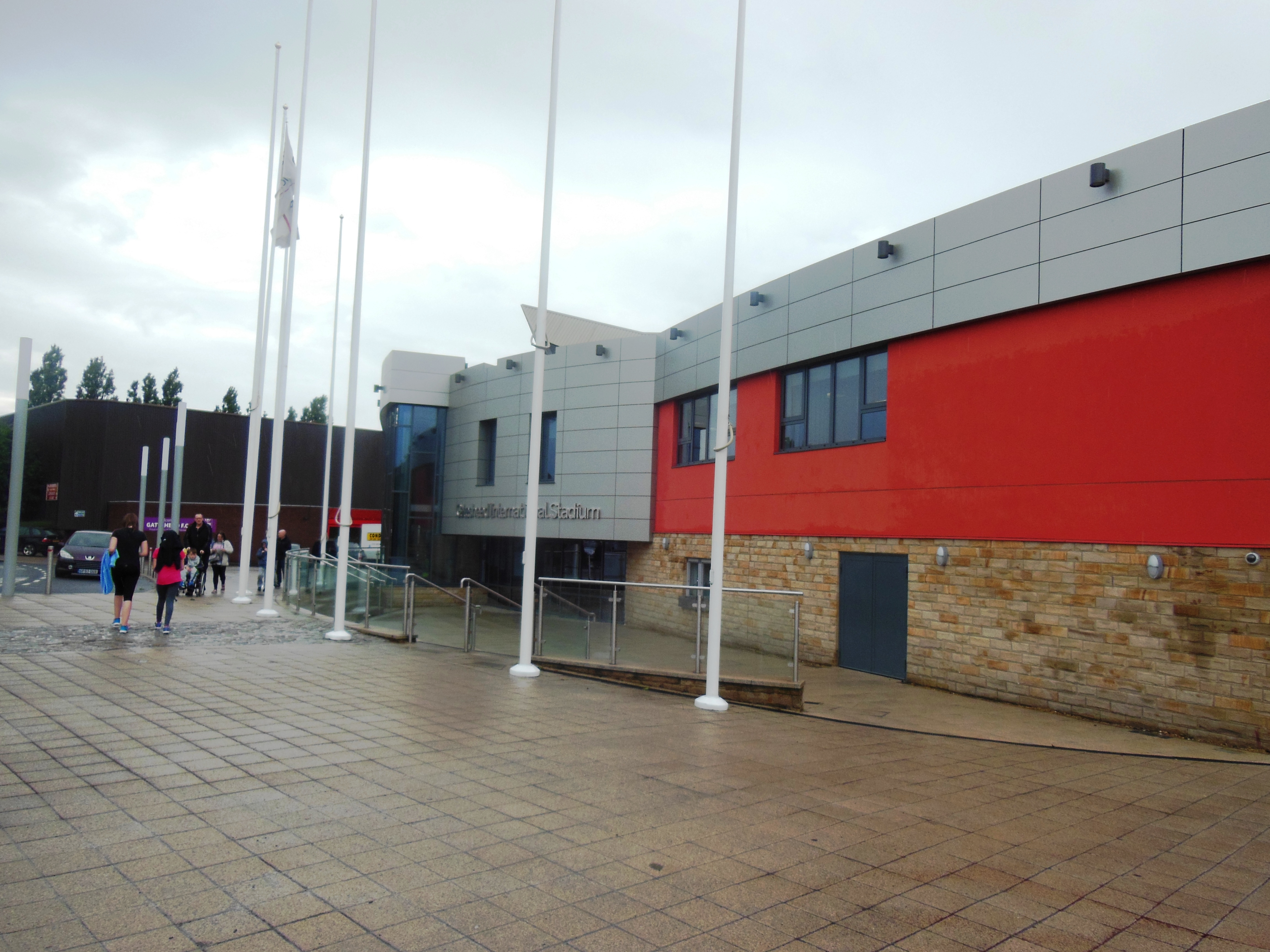
- Main entrance to the stadium
- Interactive map of Gateshead International Stadium
- Full name: Gateshead International Stadium
- Former names: Gateshead Youth Stadium
- Location: Neilson Road; Gateshead; Tyne and Wear; NE10 0EF
- Coordinates: 54°57′40″N 1°34′47″W
- Owner: Gateshead Metropolitan Borough Council
- Operator: Gateshead Metropolitan Borough Council
- Capacity: 11,800
- Surface: Synthetic running track, grass inner
- Scoreboard: Yes – by HS Sports
- Record attendance: 14,797 (sports), 30,000 (various concerts)
- Field size: 100 by 64 metres (109.4 yd × 70.0 yd)
- Acreage: 24.4 hectares

Construction
- Groundbreaking: 1955
- Built: 1955
- Opened: 27 August 1955
- Renovated: 1974
- Expanded: 2010
- Cost: Originally £30,000 (1955)

Tenants
- Gateshead A.F.C. (1973); Gateshead United (1974–1977); Gateshead F.C. (1977–present); Gateshead Harriers (1956–present); Gateshead Senators (1988–2012); Gateshead Thunder (1999); Gateshead Thunder (2001–2014); Newcastle United W.F.C. (2025–present)

Gateshead International Stadium (GIS) is a multi-purpose, all-seater venue in Gateshead, Tyne and Wear, England. Originally known as the Gateshead Youth Stadium, the venue was built in 1955 and has since been extensively redeveloped on three occasions. Its capacity of around 11,800 (Note: This is the most widely quoted figure, but at least one council document provides a figure of 11,750.) is the greatest in the Metropolitan Borough of Gateshead, the third-largest in Tyne and Wear (behind St James' Park and the Stadium of Light), and the sixth-largest in North East England.

The main arena is principally used for athletics. The inaugural athletics competition at the redeveloped venue, the 1974 "Gateshead Games", was instigated by Brendan Foster, a Gateshead Council employee at that time. By breaking the world record in the men's 3,000 m, Foster brought international publicity to the new stadium and began a tradition of athletics competitions at the venue, which has since hosted the British Grand Prix (2003–10) and the European Team Championships in 1989, 2000 and 2013. It is the only venue to have hosted the latter event three times. Five world records have been set at the stadium, including two by pole vaulter Yelena Isinbayeva and a tied 100 metres record by Asafa Powell in 2006.

Although Gateshead International Stadium primarily caters for athletics, it is the current or former home to teams in several sports. It has been used by Gateshead F.C. and its predecessors since 1973. It was home to the Gateshead Thunder rugby league club during their spell in the Super League, and the replacement Gateshead Thunder club played home games in the main arena, which was known as the Thunderdome when used by that team until the club relocated to Newcastle in 2015. It has also been the home of Women's Super League 2 side Newcastle United Women since 2025. Gateshead Harriers Athletic Club, which includes Foster and Jonathan Edwards among its life members, are the oldest tenants, having used the site since 1956. The stadium has also been used as a concert venue by numerous musical artists, including Little Mix, Guns N' Roses, Bon Jovi, Bryan Adams and Tina Turner.

== History and development ==
The stadium is built on the site of two large chemical works opened in 1827 and 1834. These works initially thrived, but by the early part of the 20th century, both were in terminal decline and were demolished in 1932 to leave behind a 2-million-tonne heap of spoil. This land, approximately 2 miles (3.2 km) east of the centre of Gateshead, was cleared in 1942 but continued to lie derelict until the mid-1950s.

In early 1955, Gateshead Council began work on transforming this land. The Gateshead Youth Stadium, built on the site of the old chemical works, was opened by Jim Peters on 27 August 1955. Costing £30,000, the original venue contained little more than a cinder running track and an asphalt cycling track, though floodlights and a seating area were added soon after. On 1 July 1961, the arena hosted its first major competition—the Vaux Breweries International Athletics Meet—but according to sportswriter John Gibson, the Youth Stadium remained "little more than a minor track with a tiny grandstand and open terraces".

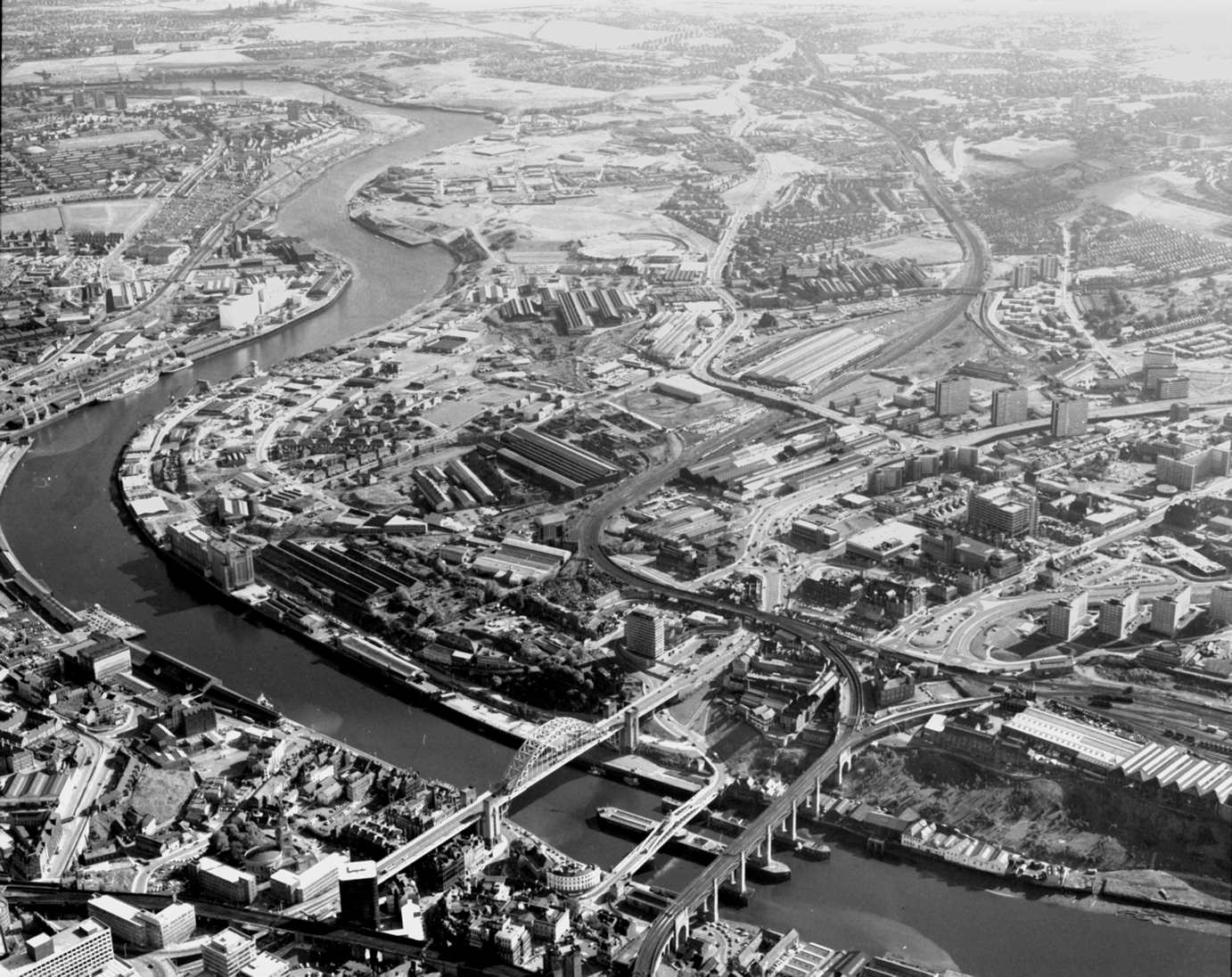
Aerial photograph of Gateshead (1975). The rebuilt stadium is prominent (top centre).

According to author Thomas Telfer, by the turn of the 1970s, the town of Gateshead was suffering from "the classic symptoms of decay in its inner-city areas". The response during the 1960s had been a program of systematic derelict land reclamation and environmental improvement. While these measures did not have an immediate positive impact on the perception of the town, Gateshead Council pressed ahead by looking to develop existing infrastructure with a view to overall regeneration. One such opportunity was identified at the Gateshead Youth Stadium, where the council believed that investment might raise the region's profile and bring international recognition. In April 1974, Gateshead Council inaugurated a "Sport and Recreation" department. In July 1974, the council appointed Brendan Foster—a former schoolteacher turned athlete and a native of Tyne and Wear—as the council's sport and recreation manager. Foster, who according to Gibson became "the father of Gateshead athletics", had been forced to train in Edinburgh during 1973 as a result of the poor condition of the Youth Stadium track. In December 1973, he had been invited to a civic reception to celebrate his breaking of the two-mile world record earlier that year at Crystal Palace. At this reception, Foster was told that a new synthetic track was being laid at Gateshead Youth Stadium. His response was a promise that, if the council was serious, he would run at the stadium and break a world record (Foster later offered an explanation of that promise: "You know how it is when you've had a few drinks—you promise the world!"). When the track was laid in early 1974, Foster became convinced of the council's sincerity. He was interviewed for the managerial position and, upon appointment, became the "driving force" behind the program of improvements to the Youth Stadium, which included the building of the main, covered Tyne and Wear stand in 1981 and three accompanying stands; the venue was renamed the Gateshead International Stadium. This first tranche of improvements cost around £8 million, and Foster's proposal to commemorate the re-opening with an athletic event was approved, allowing for the first "Gateshead Games" to be held in 1974.

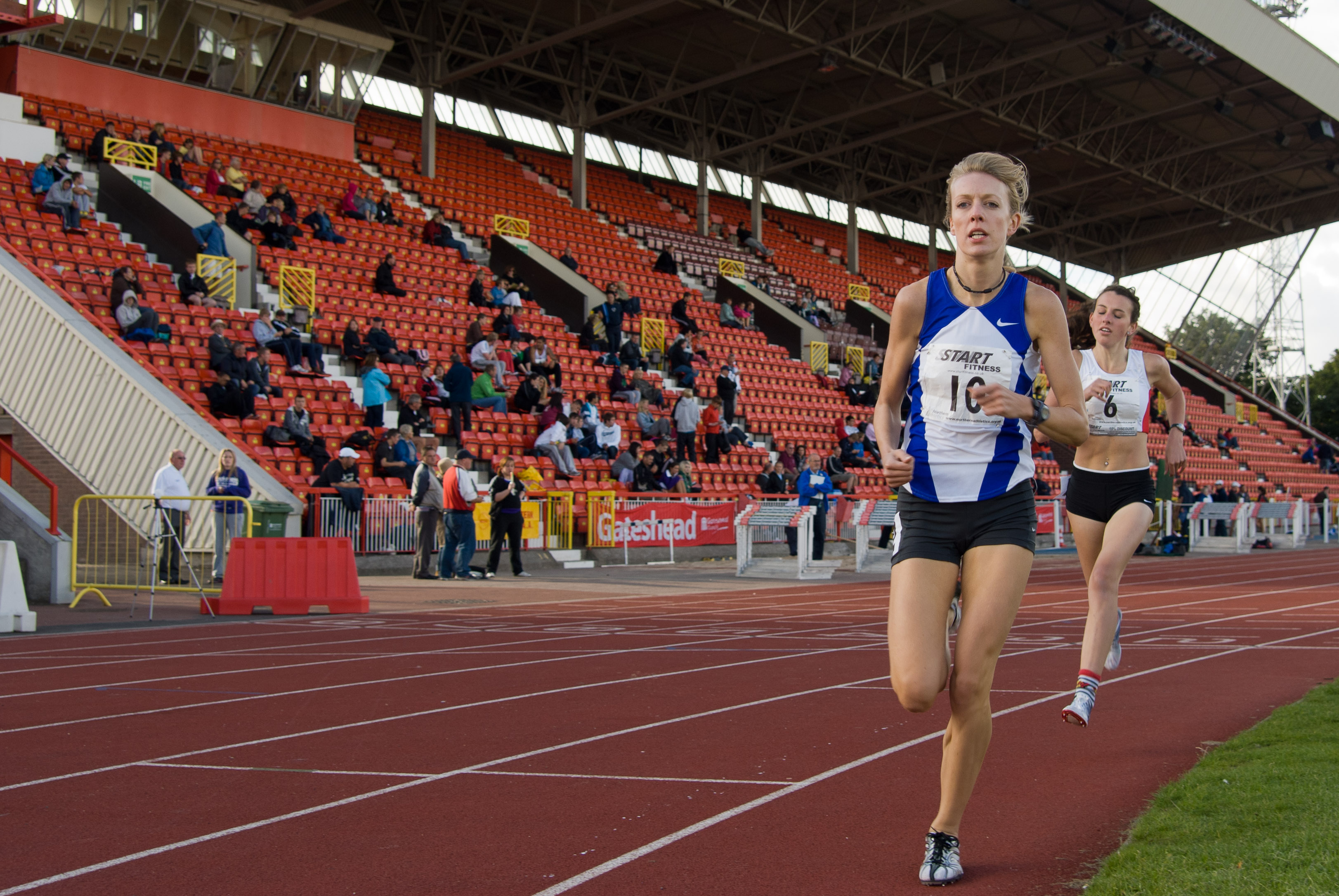
Young athletes run past the Tyne and Wear stand at Gateshead International Stadium in August 2010.

The success of the first Gateshead Games and their subsequent annual renewal raised the profile of the stadium and caused Gateshead Council to further their financial investment. During the 1980s, additions were made to the site infrastructure, including the building of an indoor sports hall, outdoor football pitches and a gymnasium. In 1989, the running track was again relayed, and Gateshead confirmed its reputation as a top-class athletics venue by hosting the Europa Cup (forerunner to the European Team Championships). In the 21st century, the site has been the subject of two major redevelopment projects. The first was completed in 2006, when two artificial outdoor football pitches, indoor athletic training facilities, sports science provisions and conferencing rooms were added at a cost of £15 million. The revamped stadium, funded by collaboration between One NorthEast, Sport England, and Gateshead College, among others, was opened on 12 May 2006 by Sebastian Coe.

A second tranche of development, undertaken in two stages, was approved in November 2009. This included a general refurbishment and improvement of the existing facilities at the stadium, adding cover, better toilets and new refreshment facilities to the exposed East Stand, improving wheelchair access, adding extra catering and conferencing facilities, and a new media and management centre. This was funded by collaboration between Gateshead Council, local development funds and Gateshead College. The covering of the 4,000-seat East Stand with a new canopy roof was completed in July 2010, immediately prior to Gateshead hosting a Diamond League event. The second stage of redevelopment—the building of the corporate and media facilities—commenced on 6 September 2010 and was completed on time in summer 2011. The total cost of the work was estimated to be £7.6 million.

A third programme of expansion was initially mooted in 2008. The aim of this programme was to expand the stadium into an all-embracing "sports village", replete with an ice rink, indoor golf course, restaurants and shops. Gateshead Council invited tenders in August 2008 from commercial organisations interested in undertaking the development. A formal draft development brief was compiled and published in November 2009. A report to Council in December 2009 noted that there had been "a reasonable level of interest at the preliminary stage" from private investors, but that only one detailed proposal had been submitted, which had been declined by the Council on financial grounds. The report also noted concerns that the original centrepiece of the proposed village, the ice rink, may have been deterring investors and that a similar proposal to redevelop land at the Stadium of Light in Sunderland was detracting from what councillors had hoped to be a unique feature of the proposed village. The result was that a fresh proposal was raised to remove the ice rink from the brief in an attempt to "stimulate the market". A public consultation was undertaken, and in May 2010, the council reported that 327 of the 375 responses received were in favour of the amended proposal. As a result, notice was given to developers that the council intended to market the site, and ten responses were received.

In 2024, Greenwich Leisure Limited was appointed by Gateshead Council to run the stadium as well as other facilities.

== Structure and facilities ==
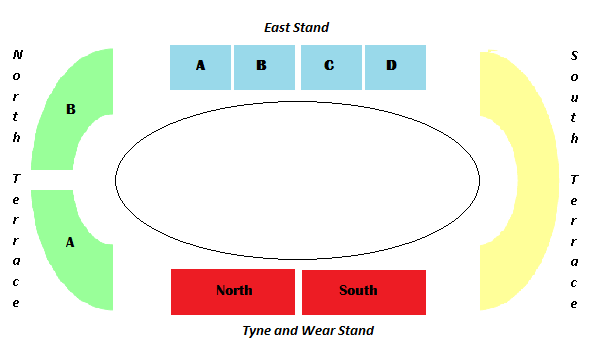
Diagram demonstrating layout of main arena at Gateshead International Stadium

=== Stadium seating ===
The main athletics arena at Gateshead International Stadium is an all-seater, bowl-shaped arena consisting of four stands. The precise capacity of the venue is uncertain; some sources claim it to be 11,750, others 11,762, and some provide a figure of 11,800.

==== West Stand ====
Capacity: 3,300

The main stand is the Tyne and Wear Stand, a steep, cantilevered structure seating 3,300 spectators. This stand contains toilet and catering facilities and a bar area.

Four turnstiles feed this stand, two at each end and separated by the connected sports hall. This means that away supporters can be housed in the West stand if a smaller following is brought.

==== East Stand ====
Capacity: 4,000 (3,160 used for football)

A 4,000-seat structure that was uncovered until the second renovation in 2010, when a cantilevered canopy roof was added which covered the entire length of the stand, incorporating five barrel vault forms. Additionally during this renovation, concourse improvements were made, including new toilets and catering facilities. This stand currently serves as the primary away section.

In 2019, the roof was taken off of the East stand. It was set to be replaced in the coming years. In November 2024, it was made clear that Gateshead council would not provide a new roof for the stand and decided that the existing roof structure would be dismantled.

Normally when this stand is used for holding away supporters for football games, the first five rows of seating are covered or closed off. This totals 840 seats. Giving the East stand a working capacity of 3160 seats.

Entrance to this stand is through six turnstiles (9–14) all located around the back of the stand on the path, which leads round from Loverose Wynd, and connects to the 3G football pitch, just off of Neilson Road.

==== North Terrace ====
Capacity: 1,348

The North Terrace is made up of two separated blocks of uncovered seating. There are 4 blocks of larger seating on the West side, totaling 573 seats. And 7 blocks of smaller seating on the East side, totaling 775 seats. Combined, the North Stand Capacity is roughly 1348 seats. Entrance to the North terrace is via 3 turnstiles (turnstile 15,16 and 17) located just off of Neilson Road.

Currently, the North Terrace is rarely used, a number of seats from the smaller blocks have been taken out.

==== South Terrace ====
Capacity: 3,114

The South Terrace, sometimes referred to as simply the South Stand, consists of a continuous, uncovered bank of seating in eight blocks It has access through four turnstiles Situated in the South-West Corner. Its capacity (hand counted through Google Earth) is roughly 3,114 seats. Sometimes, when the visiting team brings a large away following, the South Terrace is used as additional away seating.

Entrance is through four turnstiles around the back of the stand, spread out along the path, leading from Loverose Wynd.

=== Athletics Track and other facilities ===
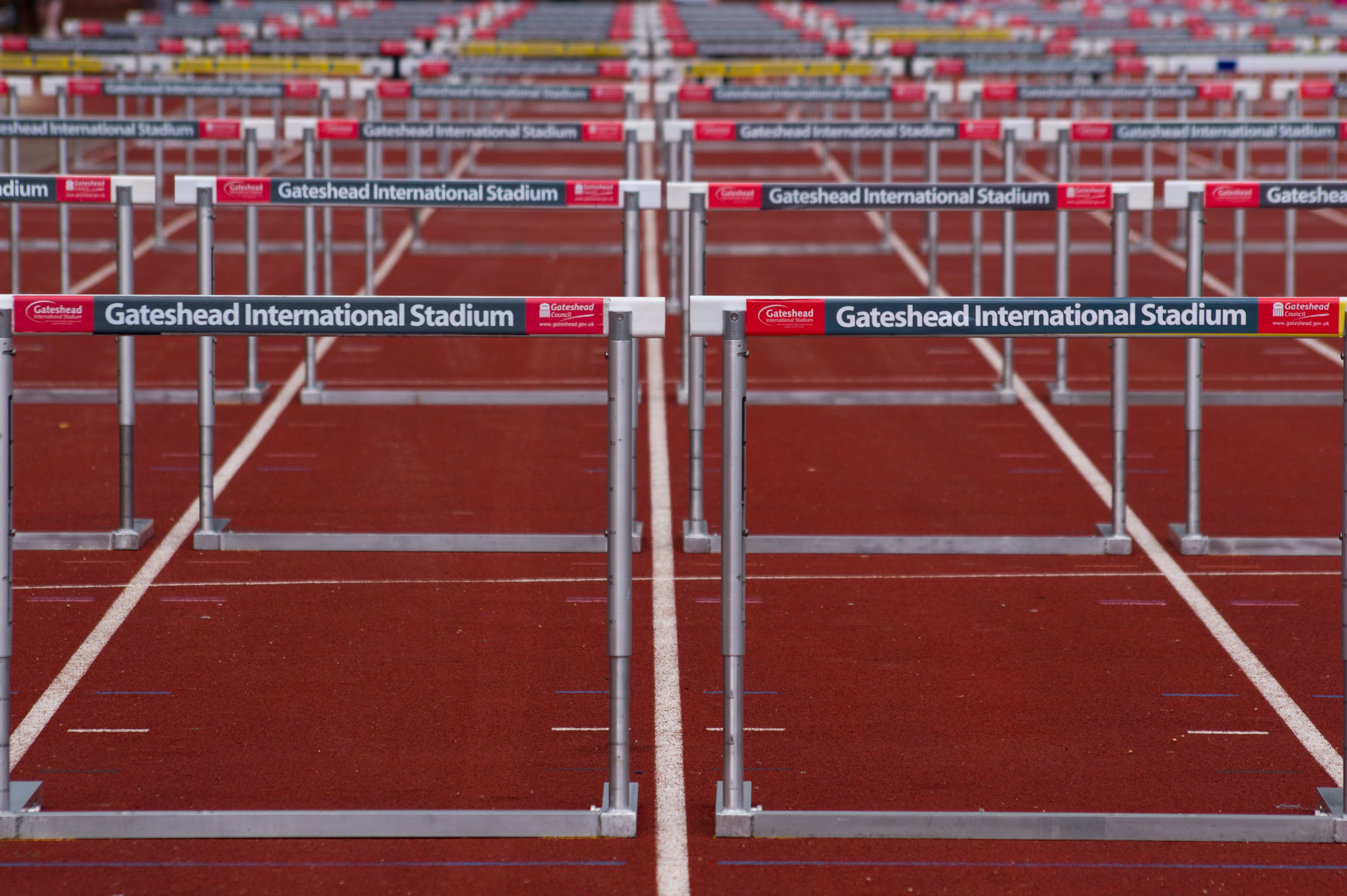
Hurdles set out on the sprint straight in 2010

The athletics track in the main arena was laid in 2003 and is an International Association of Athletics Federations (IAAF) standard 400m eight-lane oval. It is a polymer synthetic tartan track with a depth of 3 centimetres (1.18 in). The sprint straight consists of eight lanes and is situated in front of the Tyne and Wear Stand, adjacent to the long and triple jump area. A height-adjustable water jump, for use in steeplechase racing, is located on the inside of the track. Floodlights allow athletics events to be held at night. The inner track area, which is floodlit, is an IAAF standard-sized grass surface used for athletics field events, rugby and football. When used for the latter, the pitch dimensions are 100 by 64 metres (109.4 yd × 70.0 yd).

The main arena is supplemented by other facilities. To the rear of the North Terrace are two third-generation artificial pitches that are UEFA licensed, fully floodlit and full-sized for use in competitive rugby, football and American football. Alongside them are two grassed and one sand-dressed playing areas, which are also floodlit. Behind the Tyne and Wear Stand is an indoor sports hall, which contains a 33 by 44 metres (36.1 yd × 48.1 yd) playing area marked out for various sports, including badminton, netball, and tennis. A retractable indoor athletics facility was previously housed alongside the sports hall, consisting of a 50 metres (55 yd) long synthetic sprint straight and areas for throwing and jumping events, but its mechanical operation proved problematic, and a more modern structure replaced it in 2006. This facility has a 60 metres (66 yd) sprint straight in an 82 metres (90 yd) hall, throwing and jumping facilities, a weights room, and a gymnasium.

== Athletics ==
World record performances at Gateshead Stadium
Athlete name	Event	Record mark	Date
Brendan Foster (GBR)	3000m	7:35.20	3 August 1974
Daniela Bártová (CZE)	Pole vault	4.14m	2 July 1995
Yelena Isinbayeva (RUS)	Pole vault	4.82m	13 July 2003
Yelena Isinbayeva (RUS)	Pole vault	4.87m	27 June 2004
Asafa Powell (JAM)	100m	9.77	11 June 2006

The first major athletic event held at the stadium was the Vaux Breweries International Athletics meet in July 1961. According to its sponsors, the highlight of this meet was the team three-mile race, won by the Blackpool and Fylde Athletic Club, which was awarded a gold tankard as its prize. Attracted by a prize fund of £500 and the imminent AAA Championships in London, the event attracted several athletes from New Zealand, including reigning 5000m Olympic champion Murray Halberg and Peter Snell, the reigning 800m Olympic champion. Watched by a capacity crowd of 10,000 spectators, the men won their respective races; Halberg placed first in the mile with a time of 4:03:70, and Snell led a New Zealand one-two in the 880-yard event, finishing ahead of teammate Gary Philpott in 1:50:40.

When the comprehensive refurbishment of the stadium was completed more than a decade later, Brendan Foster (by this time a Gateshead Council employee) proposed an international athletics meet. On 3 August 1974, the first "Gateshead Games" were staged in front of around 10,000 spectators. Four weeks before he won the European 5000m title at the 1974 European Athletics Championships in Rome, Foster kept his earlier promise to run in the men's 3000m and won the race in a new world-record time of 7:35:20. According to journalist John Gibson, Foster's performance gave the meet, broadcast live by Tyne Tees Television, "landmark status". A plaque commemorating the record was later placed at the entrance to the stadium.

The Gateshead Games became an annual event, which gave the stadium credibility as a major sporting venue. In his managerial capacity with Gateshead Council, Foster was increasingly able to attract athletes to the games. In 1977, Foster had to intervene when BBC Radio Newcastle provided the wrong Ethiopian national anthem, which, when played, offended Miruts Yifter sufficiently that he and his teammates started off towards Newcastle International Airport. The intervention worked—in the end, Foster asked Yifter and his teammates if they would sing the anthem themselves, which they did in the middle of the stadium—and Yifter returned to outclass a field including Steve Ovett over 5000m. The track was resurfaced by Regisport in 1982, and the venue's profile was further raised in the summer of 1983, when Gateshead-born athlete Steve Cram (Note: UK Athletics state that Cram was born in Gateshead, as does an interview with Cram by Track and Field News in September 1985. Other sources, including an article from the University of Sunderland website, claim he was born in Jarrow.) faced Sebastian Coe over 800m in the Gateshead Games. In front of a reported crowd of 15,000 who were "shoehorned into the bowl" and millions more watching on BBC's Sunday Grandstand, Cram prevailed to spark "pandemonium" in his final race before winning the gold medal at the 1983 World Athletics Championships in Helsinki.

In 1989, Gateshead hosted the Europa Cup. The men's competition was won for the first time by a Great Britain team captained by Linford Christie and which included Kriss Akabusi and Jack Buckner; the event was described a decade later as having had an "invigorating effect" on those who were in attendance. Four years later, on 30 July 1993, a stadium-record crowd of 14,797 watched Christie, by this time the reigning 100m Olympic champion, in action again – this time against his old rival Carl Lewis in a race where both men were reportedly paid £100,000 irrespective of the result. Christie won in a time of 10.07 seconds, ahead of Jon Drummond in second and Lewis, who finished "a distant third". The 100m race was the highlight of the "high-profile" Vauxhall Invitational meet, which was televised in the UK by ITV and watched by around 10 million viewers. Michael Johnson, John Regis, and Steve Cram competed in various events at the Vauxhall Invitational.

In August 1998, Gateshead was selected to host the 2000 Europa Cup after the European Athletic Association switched the event from the original host venue, Martinique, to avoid athletes travelling long distances in an Olympic year. This made Gateshead the first venue to host the event twice. On 16–17 July 2000, spectators at Gateshead once again saw Great Britain's men's team take the title, this time by half a point from Germany in second place; the British victory came despite missing ten first-choice team members. The women's event was won by Russia, who defeated second-placed Germany by thirteen points.

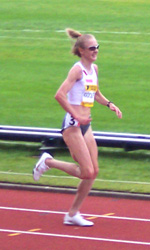
Paula Radcliffe runs the 10,000m at Gateshead in 2004.

Foster's "Gateshead Games" had become the British Grand Prix by 2003, and on 13 July, 21-year-old Yelena Isinbayeva set a new world record of 4.82m in the women's pole vault event. Isinbayeva's achievement in the last event of the meet was so unexpected that only 1,000 of the 10,000 spectators witnessed it, the rest having left early. For her achievement, she was given a bonus cheque for $50,000. On 27 June 2004, Isinbayeva returned to Gateshead. This time, the event organisers decided to schedule the pole vault event earlier and were rewarded when Isinbayeva defied extremely windy conditions to post a new record mark of 4.87m. Isinbayeva was the second woman to set a world record in the pole vault at Gateshead; Daniela Bartova did so in 1995. In 2006, a crowd of 8,500 saw Asafa Powell equal the world record of 9.77 seconds in the men's 100m. The official, unrounded time of 9.762 seconds was then the fastest time ever recorded. The meet was also notable for the return to competition of Dwain Chambers after his ban for using performance-enhancing drugs and for Eliud Kipchoge breaking Foster's stadium record over 3000m that had stood for more than three decades.

In 2010, the British Grand Prix at Gateshead was chosen as one of the inaugural fourteen Diamond League events, but although competitors included Tyson Gay, Powell, Jessica Ennis, and Vincent Chepkok, the attendance was unusually poor, causing the local press to wonder whether Gateshead's contract for the marquee event would be renewed. Those fears were to prove well-founded when UK Athletics agreed to a three-year contract to stage the event at the Alexander Stadium in Birmingham. The move prompted one reporter to lament that "the switch is a major blow to both Gateshead International Stadium and North-East sport in general, but can hardly be regarded as a major surprise given the dwindling support for major athletics events in the region."

This loss was mitigated somewhat by the European Athletic Association's decision to award Gateshead the 2013 European Team Championships, the successor to the Europa Cup. In doing so, Gateshead became the only stadium to host the European Team Championships on three occasions. The championships were held on 22–23 June 2013 amid very wet and windy conditions. On the first day of competition, Mo Farah ran a 50.89-second final lap in winning the men's 5000m to help the home team into third place on 181 points, behind Russia (194 points) and Germany (195 points). Despite a strong start, the Great Britain team were unable to make up the deficit on the second day of competition and finished in third place overall with 338 points, behind runners-up Germany (347.5 points) and the champions Russia (354.5 points).

Due to the redevelopment of Birmingham's Alexander Stadium for the 2022 Commonwealth Games, the British Grand Prix Diamond League fixture was set to return to Gateshead in 2020 for the first time in 10 years. The meeting was originally scheduled to take place on 16 August but was rescheduled to 12 September and then cancelled due to the COVID-19 pandemic in the United Kingdom.

== Tenants ==
=== Gateshead Football Club ===
The stadium was briefly used by former Football League members Gateshead A.F.C. after leaving Redheugh Park in 1973, but the club went bust later in the year. The following year, South Shields Football Club relocated to Gateshead and were renamed Gateshead United; they played at the Gateshead Stadium from 1974 to 1977, when it folded and Gateshead F.C. was formed.

Gateshead F.C. have been tenants since their formation in 1977. In May 2008, Gateshead hosted Buxton in a promotion play-off and won 2–0 in front of 1,402 spectators, the largest crowd to watch the club at the ground in 14 years. That record was broken a year later when 4,121 saw Gateshead defeat Telford United 2–0 on 9 May 2009 to win a promotion to the Conference Premier League. The current record attendance for a competitive fixture stands at 8,144, set on 4 May 2014 when Gateshead played host to Grimsby Town in the second leg of the Conference Premier play-off semi-final. Gateshead won 3–1 to progress to the final at Wembley Stadium, where they were beaten 2–1 by Cambridge United. The defeat consigned the club to a 55th consecutive season outside the Football League. Gateshead F.C. continue to play at Gateshead Stadium, but according to North East Life magazine, it is "a fine but inappropriate stadium [...] as a football ground it can be a soulless home."

In October 2009, Gateshead chairman Graham Wood unveiled plans to move to a new, purpose-built 9,000-capacity ground on Prince Consort Road in the centre of Gateshead. Detailed proposals were published soon after, and Wood told local media in 2012 that he expected the move to increase crowds and alleviate the financial constraints on him as he continued to bankroll the club; it was estimated that crowds would need to reach 3,000 regularly for the club to operate profitably from Gateshead Stadium. According to the original proposal, the stadium was expected to be ready for the 2012–13 season, but financing has been difficult, and the proposed move is now on hold.

=== Gateshead Harriers ===
Gateshead Harriers are an athletic club based at Gateshead International Stadium. Founded in 1904 as Gateshead St Mary's Church Running Club, they were initially a men-only club until they allowed the admission of women in 1951. The club moved to the Gateshead Youth Stadium in 1956, making the Harriers the stadium's oldest tenant. In 2006, they won a promotion to the first division of the British Athletics League and were the only club from the north-east of England to compete at that level. After a six-year stay in the division, the Harriers were relegated to division two in August 2012 after failing to win enough points at the final meet of the season at Eton to prevent a bottom-two league finish. Club officials received over 100 new applications for membership in the aftermath of the 2012 London Olympics.

At least one Gateshead Harrier has taken part in every Olympics and Paralympics held since 1972. Notable alumni include Brendan Foster, who joined the club aged 17 and later claimed that "my first aim was to be the best runner of Gateshead Harriers". Foster, inducted into the England Athletics Hall of Fame in 2010 and then voted the eleventh "greatest Geordie" in a local poll, later became the president of Gateshead Harriers and remains so as of 2012. Current world triple-jump record holder Jonathan Edwards, another member of the England Athletics Hall of Fame, joined Gateshead Harriers in 1991. Edwards was a member of the club when he set his record mark in winning gold at the 1995 World Championships in Helsinki, winning Olympic gold at the 2000 Sydney Games and a second world title a year later in Edmonton. Both Foster and Edwards are honorary life members of the club.

=== Gateshead Thunder ===
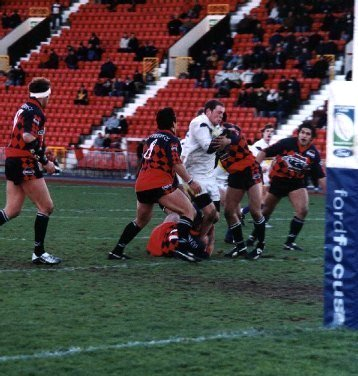
Gateshead Thunder playing against Limoux in the Challenge Cup at Gateshead International Stadium in 2004

In 1998, Gateshead was awarded a rugby league franchise after a three-way contest with Cardiff and Swansea. The result was Gateshead Thunder, who played in Super League IV in 1999. The Thunder played at Gateshead International Stadium, and the club had, according to sports journalist Andy Wilson, "an enjoyable and surprisingly successful season", which included home and away wins against St Helens and a sixth-place finish in the table – missing out on the playoffs by two points. Despite these performances, which attracted an average crowd of 3,895 to Gateshead Stadium, the franchise lost £700,000 in its first year, and in November 1999, the Rugby Football League (RFL) approved a merger with the Hull Sharks. The result was the formation of Hull FC, and when the authorities refused permission for the merged clubs to enter a Hull-based team into the RFL's second tier, the franchise moved almost in its entirety to Hull, ending Gateshead's Super League participation after a single season; according to Wilson, the Thunder was "left to die, provoking bitter resentment" from supporters.

In July 2000, a bid by a new Gateshead Thunder team was accepted and they joined the Northern Ford Premiership in the 2001 season. There have been some highlights, including winning Championship 1 in 2008 and a run to the quarter-final of the Challenge Cup in 2009, which ended in a 66–6 defeat to Super League side St Helens. However, the Thunder went through a 64-game losing streak spanning two-and-a-half years before winning against Workington Town on 29 August 2012.

Relations between the Thunder and Gateshead Council were strained at times, with a possible move to Kingston Park, Newcastle upon Tyne, first mooted and rejected in 2006. In 2008, the club committed itself again to Gateshead Stadium for the immediate future; however, in March 2014, The Journal reported that talks had begun between Thunder's managing director Keith Christie and representatives of Newcastle Falcons with a view to the Falcons taking over the rugby league club. Falcons' owner Semore Kurdi confirmed that a bid had been made to purchase Gateshead Thunder on 20 March 2014, though he refused to elaborate on whether he intended to relocate the club if that bid was accepted. The takeover was confirmed on 23 May 2014, though it was announced that the club would continue to play at the International Stadium. In January 2015, Gateshead Thunder were officially renamed Newcastle Thunder and relocated to Kingston Park. Keith Christie told the BBC that the move was "a business decision" designed to build a new fan base for the club.

In May 2024, the club announced an immediate return to Gateshead from Kingston Park. They played there for the remainder of the season before relocating to Crow Trees, the home ground of Blaydon RFC, in 2025.

=== Gateshead Senators ===
The Gateshead Senators (originally the Gateshead International Senators) are an American football club formed in 1988 when the Newcastle Senators, who played at Northern Rugby Club, moved across the Tyne to play at the Gateshead International Stadium. The club have had mixed fortunes, but their most successful season came in 1999. Having won eight of their nine games in the regular season, the team won the Division One North title and advanced to the end-of-season playoffs. After beating the Merseyside Nighthawks 43–0 in the quarter-finals, the Senators defeated the Essex Spartans 33–19 in the semi-finals to reach the championship final. At the Saffron Lane Stadium in Leicester, the Senators faced the Bristol Aztecs. In a tight encounter, the Senators claimed the Division One British American Football League title with a 7–2 victory. The club reached the playoffs again in the next three seasons but were unable to replicate that success, and after a season voluntarily spent in Division Two in 2003, returned to Division One North in 2004. They continue to play in that division and, in the 2012 season, failed to make the playoffs after recording five wins and five defeats in their ten games.

The Senators were a tenant at Gateshead Stadium from 1988 to 2011. In 2012, the club announced plans to move away from Gateshead for the start of the 2012 season to create a better "game-day experience", and they now play at the Monkton Stadium.

=== Newcastle United W.F.C. ===
Newcastle United W.F.C are a professional English women's football club, affiliated with Newcastle United F.C. They were founded in 1989 and are based at the Newcastle United Academy Training Centre, Benton, Newcastle upon Tyne. On 25 July 2025. The club announced that they were leaving their home at Kingston Park and moving to Gateshead's, all-seater venue. The move was prompted as Newcastle needed permanent access to a predominantly natural grass pitch, complying with current Women's Super League (WSL) rules, which means a “Grass Pitch” (as that term is defined in the Laws of the Game). As part of the move promotion hunting, Newcastle United Women will invest in an elite playing surface and upgraded facilities.

== Concert venue ==
Gateshead International Stadium has been used for many years as a concert venue. On 31 July 1982, the Police performed at the stadium as part of their Ghost in the Machine Tour, with U2 as a supporting act. Reports in the local press suggested that the Police seemed disappointed that the stadium was only half full and cited high ticket prices and poor weather as possible causes. On 16 June 1992, Guns N' Roses, supported by Soundgarden and Faith No More, performed at the stadium. This time, the weather was hot and sunny, which helped ensure that the concert, part of the Use Your Illusion Tour, was a sell-out. American rock group Bon Jovi have played twice at the stadium. The first occasion was on 27 June 1995, while supported by Skin, on their These Days Tour. The group returned to Gateshead on 22 August 2000 as part of their Crush Tour.

Tina Turner performed multiple times at the stadium. As part of her Foreign Affair: The Farewell Tour, she performed twice on consecutive nights (21–22 July 1990) and attracted a total of 60,000 spectators. Turner performed for a third time at the stadium as part of her Wildest Dreams Tour on 12 July 1996. The venue later played host to Little Mix on 26 July 2018 as part of their Summer Hits Tour. Other artists to have played at the stadium include Bryan Adams, Rod Stewart, Simple Minds, and Simply Red. In 2024, the venue hosted an Ibiza music festival.

== Transport ==
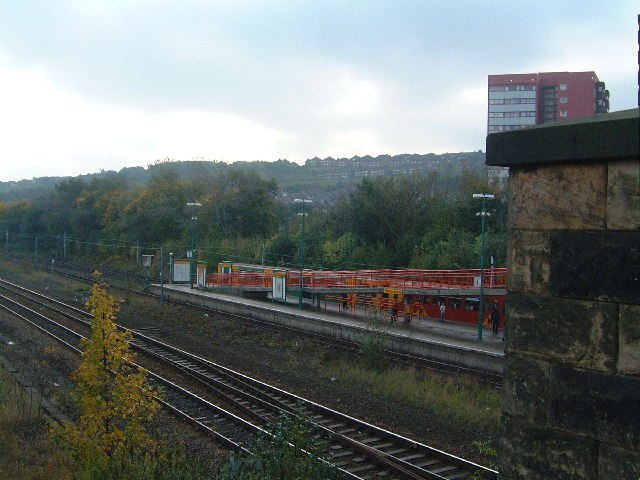
Gateshead Stadium Metro station

Gateshead International Stadium is 2 miles (3 km) east of Gateshead Town Centre and is on the A184 Felling Bypass, with access to a car park at Neilson Road. Journey time by car from Gateshead town centre is approximately five minutes and a further five minutes travel from Newcastle upon Tyne. A footpath runs adjacent to the Felling bypass, and the journey by foot from Gateshead town centre takes some fifteen minutes. A journey east to Heworth Interchange also takes around fifteen minutes. Two designated cycle routes run past the stadium. These are Hadrian's Way, which provides access from Tynemouth in the east and Wylam in the west, and the Keelman's Way, which runs along the south bank of the River Tyne towards Blaydon-on-Tyne.

The stadium is well served by public transport. It has its own Tyne and Wear Metro station, the Gateshead Stadium Metro station. This is at Shelley Drive, some five minutes' walk from the ground. Trains run direct from this station to all other Metro destinations; trains to South Shields and South Hylton stop at Platform 1, while trains travelling towards St James and Airport stop at Platform 2. The Gateshead Stadium Metro station is open seven days a week, and at peak times, seventeen trains per hour stop there. The nearest mainline railway station is Newcastle Central Station, around 3 miles (5 km) away, though local rail travel calls at Heworth Interchange. Go North East operates the 93/94 "East Gateshead Loop" bus service, which provides access to the stadium from the Team Valley, Gateshead Interchange, Heworth Interchange and Queen Elizabeth Hospital in Sheriff Hill. This bus runs every 20 minutes during the day and every hour during the evenings.

== Bibliography ==
- "Report to Cabinet – Gateshead International Stadium – Draft Development Brief" (PDF). Gateshead MBC. 25 May 2010. Archived from the original (PDF) on 2 October 2011.
- Hewitt, Joan (1990). File on Felling. Gateshead Central Library.
- Lewis, Samuel (1848). A Topographical Dictionary of England. Lewis.
- Luhtala, Seppo (2002). Top distance runners of the Century. Mayer & Mayer Verlag.
- Miller, Stephen (2008). Paralympian, My Autobiography. Tonto Books.
- Telford, Thomas (1988). Urban Regeneration. The Institute of Civil Engineers.
- Unknown (1961). The Brewing Grade Review. Brewers' Society, London.
- Welch, Chris (1995). The Tina Turner Experience. Virgin.
