= Nathan McAvoy =

England international rugby league & union footballer

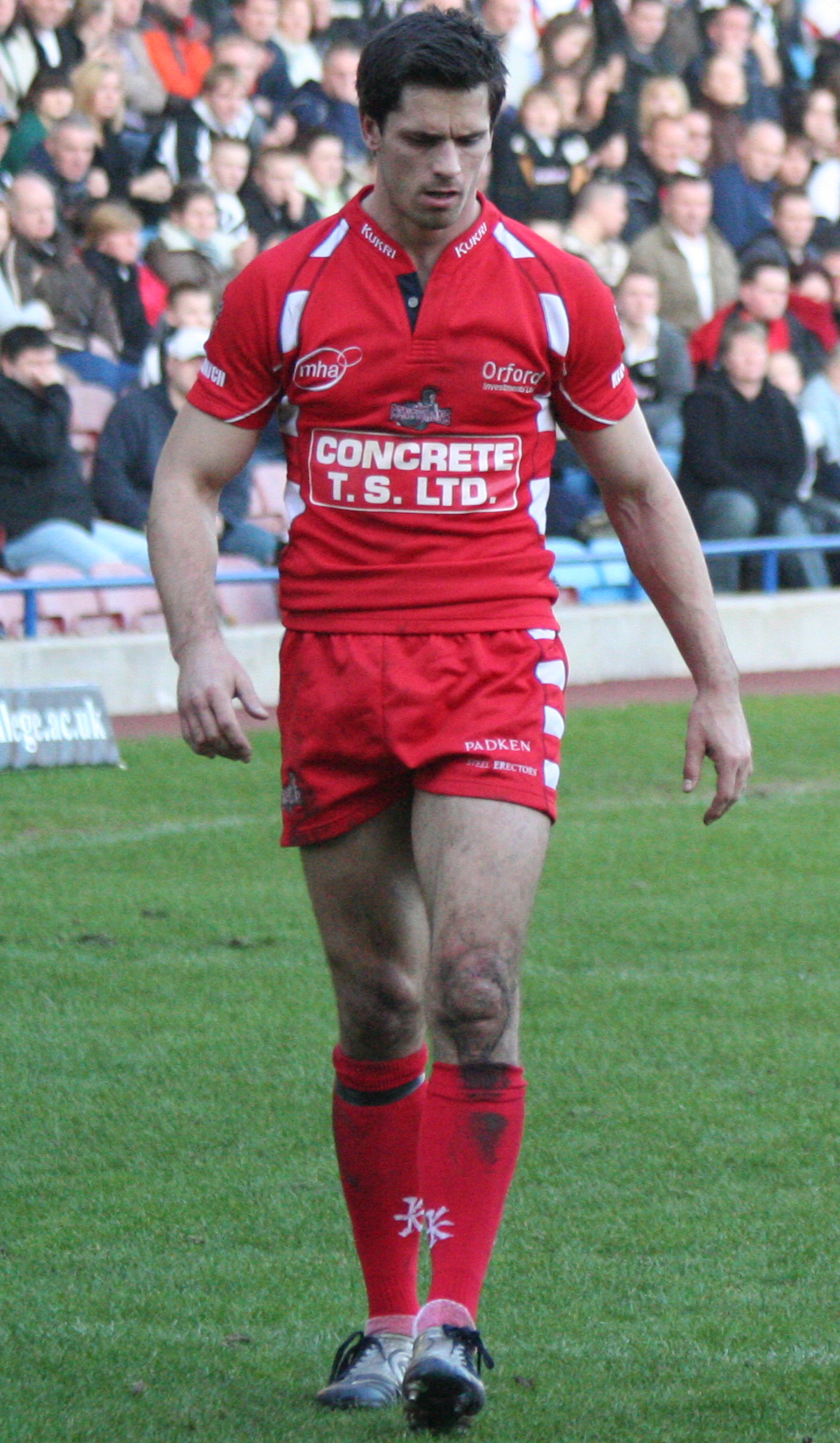

Personal information
- Full name: Nathaniel Joseph McAvoy
- Born: 31 December 1976 (age 49) Stockport, Greater Manchester, England

Playing information
- Height: 6 ft 4 in (1.93 m)
- Weight: 16 st 5 lb (104 kg)

Rugby league
- Position: Centre, Wing
Club
Years	Team	Pld	T	G	FG	P
1994–98	Salford	118	75
1998–02	Bradford Bulls	97	52	0	0	208
2004–05	Salford City Reds	26	3	0	0	12
2006	Leeds Rhinos	1	0	0	0	0
2006	Wigan Warriors	17	5	0	0	20
2007	Bradford Bulls	29	1	0	0	4
2008	Leigh Centurions	11	5	0	0	20
	Total	299	141	0	0	264
Representative
Years	Team	Pld	T	G	FG	P
1994–94	Great Britain U21	1	0	0	0	0
1996–99	England	4	0	0	0	0

Rugby union
- Position: Centre, Wing
Club
Years	Team	Pld	T	G	FG	P
2003–04	Saracens

Nathaniel Joseph McAvoy (born 31 December 1976) is an English former professional rugby league footballer who played as a centre or wing. He spent most of his club career with Salford (1994–98 and 2004–05) and Bradford Bulls (1998–2002 and 2007), but also had short spells with Leeds Rhinos, Wigan Warriors and Leigh Centurions. At international level, he was capped four times for England between 1996 and 1999. He also played rugby union for Saracens in 2003–04. As of 2011, he is a qualified PE teacher and teaches in Manchester.

== Playing career ==
=== Salford ===
Born and brought up in Weaste, Salford, McAvoy's first professional contract was given to him by Salford. He joined Salford in 1994 from Eccles ARL, where he played alongside Adrian Morley, Ian Watson and Carlo Napolitano. He made 118 appearances for the Salford City Reds, scoring 75 tries during his five-year stint at the club.

=== Bradford Bulls ===
Super League giants Bradford Bulls signed McAvoy in July 1998 for a fee of £140,000. McAvoy played for Bradford Bulls from the interchange bench in the 1999 Super League Grand Final which was lost to St. Helens. During his time at Bradford he lifted the Rugby League Challenge Cup, and the Grand Final in which he scored a spectacular try against bitter rivals Leeds Rhinos in 2000 which is remembered fondly by fans.

=== Rugby union ===
Nathan left Bradford and decided it was time for a new challenge and changed codes to play rugby union for Saracens during the 2003–04 season. His rugby union career was frustrating with an early injury causing loss of form and only made a handful of appearances before joining Salford again mid-2004.

=== Later career ===
He joined Leeds Rhinos in January 2006 and he made his début in the Tetleys Festive Challenge at Headingley against Wakefield Trinity Wildcats, and scored a try in a 46 – 18 win

It was announced on 28 April 2006 that Nathan had joined Wigan Warriors on a months loan. A day later it was announced that Leeds Rhinos had released Nathan from his contract.

Nathan was awarded with a 1-year contract at the JJB Stadium this season after successfully helping the Wigan club survive relegation last season.

It was announced 2 February 2007 that Nathan was not offered a contract with Wigan and will be returning to Bradford for the 2007 season taking the squad number 2.

In August 2007 it was announced that Nathan would be released at the end of 2007.

In December 2007, it was announced that Nathan had signed a part-time contract to play with Leigh Centurions for the 2008 season.

=== Representative career ===
In 1994, McAvoy played for Great Britain under-21s against Australia.

McAvoy won caps for England while at Salford in 1996 against Wales, and while at Bradford Bulls in 1999 against France, and France (sub).

During his time at Salford, McAvoy was given the captaincy of the Great Britain Academy squad when they toured in New Zealand. He was also selected in the England squad for the 1996 European Championship, and he made his début against Wales before being named in the squad for the 2000 World Cup.

== Post-playing career ==
In the 2008 season, McAvoy suffered a shattered kneecap and broken neck. Although he fully recovered he subsequently decided to retire from professional sport and complete his studies at Salford University where he gained a 2:1 in Sport Science & Management in 2009 (dissertation – Salary Caps in Sport).

He then went on to train as a teacher and in 2010 became a PE teacher at Manchester Academy.

Nathan currently resides on the RFL disciplinary board.
