= Steve McNamara =

English rugby league player and coach (born 1971)

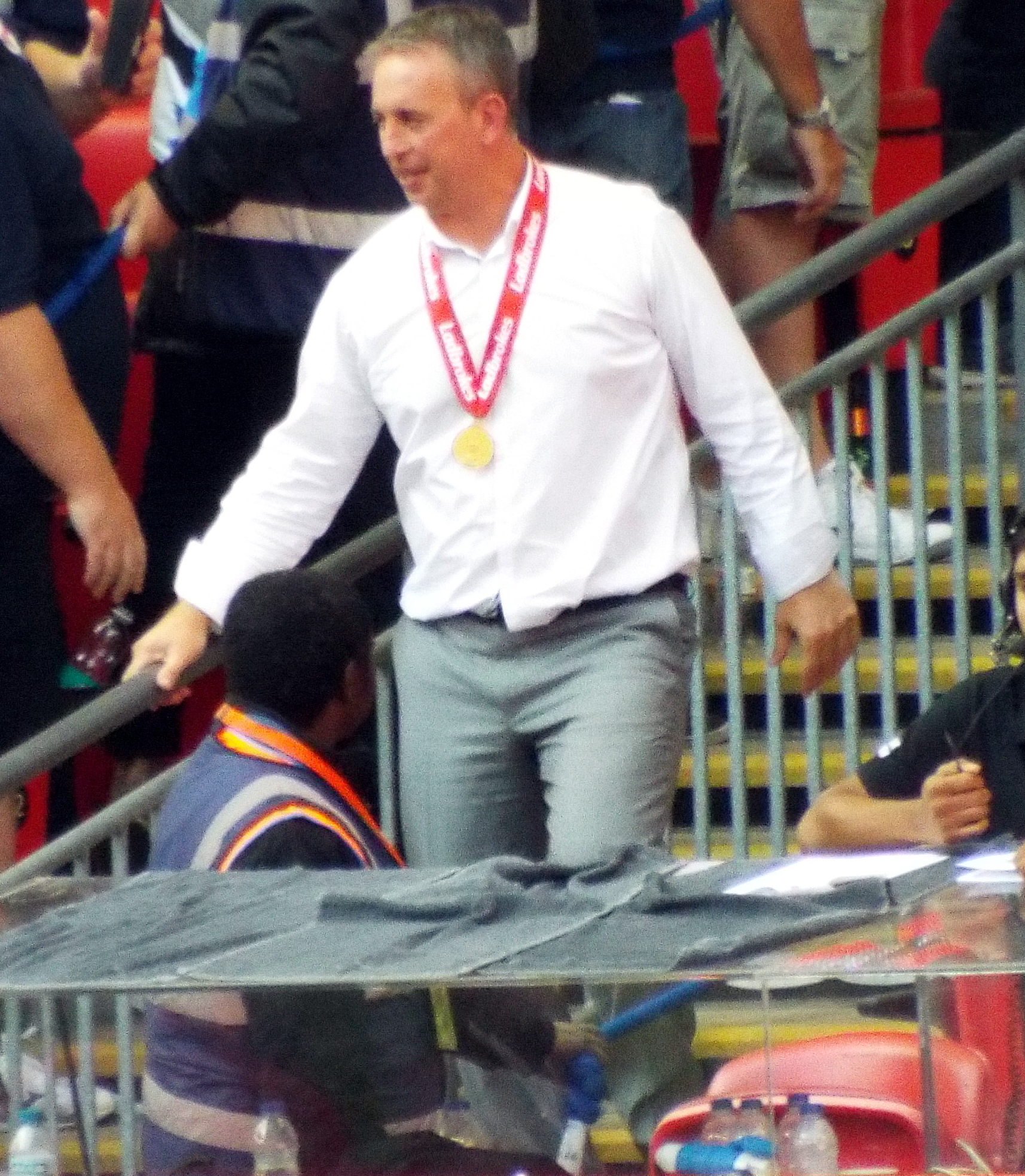

Personal information
- Full name: Steven Shaun McNamara
- Born: 18 September 1971 (age 55) Kingston upon Hull, East Riding of Yorkshire, England

Playing information
- Position: Second-row, Loose forward
Club
Years	Team	Pld	T	G	FG	P
1989–96	Hull FC	162	26	130	5	369
1996–00	Bradford Bulls	110	16	384	8	840
2000	Wakefield Trinity Wildcats	19	2	40	0	88
2001–03	Huddersfield Giants	53	4	143	1	303
	Total	344	48	697	14	1600
Representative
Years	Team	Pld	T	G	FG	P
1991–93	Great Britain U-21	5	0	0	0	0
1992–97	Great Britain	4	0	0	0	0
1995–99	England	5	0	12	0	24

Coaching information
Club
Years	Team	Gms	W	D	L	W%
2006–10	Bradford Bulls	137	69	4	64	50
2017–25	Catalans Dragons	213	124	1	88	58
2027–	Hull FC	0	0	0	0
	Total	350	193	5	152	55
Representative
Years	Team	Gms	W	D	L	W%
2010–15	England	27	16	0	11	59
- Source: As of 3 November 2026
- Relatives: Ben McNamara (son)

Steve McNamara (born 18 September 1971) is an English professional rugby league football coach who is head coach of Hull FC in the Super League, and a former professional rugby league footballer. He is a former coach of England, and a Great Britain international as a player.

At club level he played for Hull FC, Bradford Bulls, Wakefield Trinity Wildcats and the Huddersfield Giants. He came through the coaching ranks at the Bradford Bulls, rising to the Head coach position in the Super League. He held assistant coaches positions at the Sydney Roosters and the New Zealand Warriors in the NRL, and was then head coach of the Catalans Dragons from 2017 to 2025.

McNamara is currently the most successful head coach in the Catalans Dragons club history, winning the 2018 Challenge Cup, and taking the Dragons to two Super League Grand Finals in 2021 and 2023 as runners-up, including winning the League Leaders' Shield in 2021.

== Early years ==
McNamara was born in Kingston upon Hull, East Riding of Yorkshire, England. He attended South Holderness Technology College in Preston, Hull.

== Playing career ==
=== Hull FC ===
McNamara joined Hull FC from local amateur side Skirlaugh Bulls at the age of 17 and he was selected to go on the 1992 Great Britain Lions tour of Australia and New Zealand. McNamara won caps for Great Britain while at Hull F.C. in 1992 against France (sub), in 1993 against France (sub), won caps for England while at Hull FC in 1995 against Wales (sub), and France. He'd spent seven years with Hull FC, before moving to the Bradford Bulls in 1996.

=== Bradford Bulls ===
While at the Bradford Bulls in 1996 he also played for England against France. He played for Great Britain while at Bradford Bulls in 1997 against Australia (SL) (2 matches) (sub). McNamara played for the Bradford Bulls at loose forward in the 1999 Super League Grand Final which was lost to St. Helens. In 1999 he represented England against France (2 matches). At the Bradford Bulls he was the main goal-kicker and kicked 349 goals.

=== Wakefield Trinity Wildcats ===
McNamara was released from the Bradford Bulls in 2000 and joined Wakefield Trinity Wildcats (captain). In 2000, at the height of a financial crisis at Wakefield Trinity Wildcats, the contracts of all players aged over 24 were terminated during September 2000. The players affected were; Andy Fisher, Bobbie Goulding, Warren Jowitt, Tony Kemp (player-coach), Steve McNamara, Francis Maloney, Martin Masella, Steve Prescott, Bright Sodje, Francis Stephenson and Glen Tomlinson.

McNamara joined the Huddersfield Giants before joining the coaching staff at Bradford Bulls at the end of the 2003's Super League VIII.

== Coaching career ==
He coached the Bradford Bulls' Senior Academy to Grand Final success in his first year as a coach at the club.

On 20 April 2006 Steve was promoted to head coach of Bradford Bulls following Brian Noble's departure to Wigan Warriors. At the time he was the youngest coach in Britain.

In his first season in charge, he guided the Bradford Bulls to the Super League playoffs before the club were knocked out of the grand final eliminator by Hull FC.

McNamara was appointed Great Britain assistant coach on 30 April 2007.

His coaching career while at the Bradford Bulls contains several unwanted records, such as being the first Bradford Bulls coach in Super League to fail to guide his team to the end of season play-offs and being in charge for the worst losing streak the club has seen in 20 years.

Bradford Bulls fans became increasingly frustrated with his team's lacklustre performances since taking over the reins in 2006 and following defeat by Harlequins RL (the 8th defeat in a row, the Bradford Bulls worst run in Super League history). His time as Bradford Bulls head coach came to an end on 13 July 2010 as the Bradford Bulls board ended his contract by mutual consent and allowed him to become full-time England coach.

As of April 2010 he was part-time England coach until the end of the 2010 Super League season. He became full-time England coach afterwards. He won his first game as England coach against France 60–6. This game was played at the Leigh Sporting Village on Saturday 12 June 2010.

He coached England to the 2013 Rugby League World Cup semi-final.

On 12 December 2013, McNamara was appointed the assistant coach of the 2013 National Rugby League (NRL) premiers the Sydney Roosters. The Sydney Roosters head coach Trent Robinson was looking for a new assistant coach because his previous assistant Paul Green took up the head coaching position of the North Queensland Cowboys.

He joined the New Zealand Warriors for the 2017 season.

=== Catalans Dragons ===
He coached Catalans to the 2018 Challenge Cup Final victory over the Warrington Wolves at Wembley Stadium.

In the 2021 Super League season, McNamara guided Catalans to their first ever League Leaders Shield and first ever Grand Final. McNamara was also named Super League's coach of the year. On 9 October 2021, McNamara coached Catalans in their 2021 Super League Grand Final defeat against St. Helens. On 14 October 2023, McNamara coached Catalans in their 2023 Super League Grand Final loss against Wigan. Catalans became the first team since the Super League era began in 1996 to not score a try in the final.

On 20 May 2025, it was announced that McNamara had left the club with immediate effect, with assistant coach Joel Tomkins expected to take over as interim manager.

=== Hull F.C. ===
In April 2026, it was announced that McNamara had signed a deal to become Hull's new head coach ahead of the 2027 Super League season.

=== International coaching record ===
Four Nations record
Year	Round	Position	GP	W	L	D
Australia/New Zealand 2010	Third place	3/4	3	1	2	0
England/Wales 2011	Second place	2/4	4	2	2	0
Australia/New Zealand 2014	Third place	3/4	3	1	2	0
Total	0 Titles	0/3	10	4	6	0

World Cup record
Year	Round	Position	GP	W	L	D
England/Wales 2013	Third place	3/14	5	3	2	0
Total	0 Titles	0/1	5	3	2	0

Baskerville Shield record
Year	Round	Position	GP	W	L	D
2015	Winners	1/2	3	2	1	0
Total	1 Title	1/1	3	2	1	0

International Origin
Year	Round	Position	GP	W	L	D
2011 match	Second place	2/2	1	0	1	0
2012 series	Second place	2/2	2	1	1	0
2013 match	Champions	1/2	1	1	0	0
Total	1 Title	1/3	4	2	2	0

Autumn International Series
Year	Round	Position	GP	W	L	D
2012 series	Champions	1/3	3	3	0	0
Total	1 Title	1/1	3	3	0	0

Other Test matches
Year	Round	Position	GP	W	L	D
2010	Winners	1/2	1	1	0	0
2015	Winners	1/2	1	1	0	0
Total	2 Wins	2/2	2	2	0	0

=== Overall record ===
	Coached	Won	Lost	Drawn	% Won
Total	27	16	11	0	59.26%

As of 14 November 2015
