= Bobbie Goulding =

English rugby league coach and former rugby league footballer

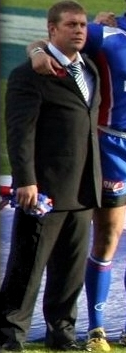
- Goulding in 2009

Personal information
- Full name: Robert Dennis Goulding
- Born: 4 February 1972 (age 54) Widnes, Lancashire, England

Playing information
- Position: Stand-off, Scrum-half
Club
Years	Team	Pld	T	G	FG	P
1988–91	Wigan	28+17	11	33	4	114
1991–92	Leeds	32+3	7	14	5	61
1992–94	Widnes	65+2	9	89	4	218
1994–98	St Helens	117	25	548	13	1209
1998–99	Huddersfield Giants	29	4	78	4	176
2000	Wakefield Trinity Wildcats	13	3	25	3	65
2001–02	Salford City Reds	33	2	59	4	130
2002	Leigh Centurions	8	4	2	1	21
2004–05	Rochdale Hornets	11+5	5	19	1	59
2014	Barrow Raiders	3	0	0	0	0
	Total	366	70	867	39	2053
Representative
Years	Team	Pld	T	G	FG	P
1990–97	Great Britain	17	6	26	1	77
1991	Lancashire	1	0	0	0	0
1995–96	England	5	2	18	1	45

Coaching information
Club
Years	Team	Gms	W	D	L	W%
2004–05	Rochdale Hornets
2007–08	Rochdale Hornets
2014	Barrow Raiders
	Total	0	0	0	0
Representative
Years	Team	Gms	W	D	L	W%
2009–11	France	10	3	0	7	30
- Source: As of 9 March 2021
- Relatives: Bobbie Goulding Jr. (son)

Robert Dennis Goulding (born 4 February 1972), is an English former professional rugby league footballer and coach, who played in the 1980s, 1990s, 2000s and 2010s, and has coached in the 2000s and 2010s.

He played at representative level for Great Britain and England, and at club level for Wigan (with whom he won the 1990 Challenge Cup and 1991 Challenge Cup), in Australia for Eastern Suburbs (Reserve Grade), and Leeds, Widnes, St Helens (with whom he won the double of the 1996 Challenge Cup and 1996's Super League I Championship as captain, but lost the Premiership to the Wigan Warriors (the League Leaders' Shield was not introduced until 2003's Super League VIII), and the 1997 Challenge Cup), Huddersfield Giants, Wakefield Trinity Wildcats, Salford City Reds, Leigh Centurions, the Rochdale Hornets and after a 9-year hiatus the Barrow Raiders, usually as a scrum-half, but also as a stand-off, and has coached at representative level for France, and at club level for the Rochdale Hornets and the Barrow Raiders.

== Background ==
Goulding was born in Widnes, Lancashire, England, and he is the father of the rugby league player Bobbie Goulding Jr.

== Playing career ==
Goulding made his senior début for Wigan at the age of 16, scoring a try in a 20–16 victory over Halifax. In 1990, he became the youngest ever Great Britain Lions tourist at 18 years of age. In 1991, he moved to Australia to play for Eastern Suburbs, but returned to Wigan a few weeks later without making a first grade appearance. Unable to establish a regular place in the first team ahead of Andy Gregory and Shaun Edwards, he joined Leeds later that year for a fee of £100,000. He spent one season at Leeds before moving to his hometown club Widnes in 1992.

Goulding transferred from Widnes to St Helens in 1994 for an initial fee of £135,000, plus an additional £25,000 after four international appearances. He once kicked 11 goals in a Super League match for St Helens. Goulding captained St Helens at scrum-half in the 1996 Challenge Cup Final, kicking four conversions and helping his team to a 40–32 victory over Bradford Bulls.

Bobbie Goulding played scrum-half, and scored two conversions in St. Helens' 16–25 defeat by Wigan in the 1995–96 Regal Trophy Final during the 1995–96 at Alfred McAlpine Stadium, Huddersfield on Saturday 13 January 1996.

Goulding represented England at the 1995 Rugby League World Cup. He was selected to play for England in the 1995 World Cup Final at scrum-half but Australia won the match and retained the Cup. He set the record as the highest points scorer in one game for Great Britain – 32 points V Fiji in 1996. At the end of Super League's first season, Goulding was named at scrum-half in the 1996 Super League Dream Team. He was the 1996 Great Britain Lions tour's top point scorer.

Goulding was sent off in the 1997 Challenge Cup fourth round match against Wigan Warriors for a high tackle on Neil Cowie during February 1997. He initially received an eight-match ban, but this was reduced to six games following an appeal. On his return to the side, he helped St. Helens win the Challenge Cup final for the second consecutive year, kicking six goals in a 32–22 victory over the Bradford Bulls. In August 1997, he was stripped of the St. Helens' captaincy for disciplinary reasons, and replaced by Chris Joynt. Two weeks later, he was sent off for the second time in the season (on this occasion for a high tackle on Leeds Rhinos prop Jamie Mathiou) and was suspended for a further four games. Despite the controversies during the season, Goulding was selected to play for Great Britain at scrum-half in all three matches of the Super League Test series against Australia.

In 1998, following further disciplinary problems, and the emergence of Sean Long as a replacement for St. Helens at scrum-half, he moved to Huddersfield Giants on a free transfer. He went on to play for Wakefield Trinity Wildcats and Salford City Reds before ending his career as a player-coach with Rochdale Hornets, with his final appearance as a player coming in 2005.

On 1 June 2014, Goulding came out of playing retirement (after a nine-year break) to play in for Barrow Raiders in their Championship fixture against fellow strugglers Rochdale Hornets. Goulding played with number 3+4 on his back, because the number 7 squad number was taken by Barrow Raiders Liam Campbell. Goulding helped the team to only their second victory at that point all season and lifted Barrow Raiders off the bottom of the table. He was sent off for dissent in the next fixture against Doncaster, and received a five-match suspension for the incident.

== Coaching career ==
He joined Rochdale Hornets initially as player-coach, and his playing career ended in 2005 after a biceps injury. He left his post at Rochdale Hornets in November 2005, citing frustration at the club's financial problems. During his two seasons in charge at the National League One club he had not had a proper contract, despite impressing and twice being nominated for coach of the year.

He rejoined Rochdale Hornets as a coach in September 2007 before departing again in May 2008.

On 28 February 2009 Goulding was named the coach of France.

On 31 March 2014 he took charge as head coach of Championship side Barrow Raiders with the club rooted to the bottom of the league. His job was to try to keep Barrow out of the bottom 5 relegation places as the leagues were being restructured in 2015. He failed to achieve this and left at the end of the season.

== Financial crisis at the Wakefield Trinity Wildcats ==
In 2000, at the height of a financial crisis at the Wakefield Trinity Wildcats, the contracts of all players aged over 24 were terminated during September 2000. The players affected were; Goulding, Andy Fisher, Warren Jowitt, Tony Kemp (player-coach), Steve McNamara, Francis Maloney, Martin Masella, Steve Prescott, Bright Sodje, Francis Stephenson and Glen Tomlinson.
