= 1999 Super League season =

Season in rugby league

Super League IV
- League: Super League
- Duration: 30 Rounds
- Teams: 14
- Highest attendance: 24,020; Bradford Bulls vs Leeds Rhinos (3 Sept)
- Lowest attendance: 1,580; Gateshead Thunder vs Hull Sharks (19 May)
- Broadcast partners: Sky Sports

1999 Season
- Champions: St. Helens; 2nd Super League title 9th British title
- League Leaders: Bradford Bulls
- Man of Steel: (Australia) Adrian Vowles
- Top point-scorer: (Wales) Iestyn Harris (325)
- Top try-scorer: (New Zealand) Toa Kohe-Love (25)

Left League
- Merged with Hull FC Merger with Huddersfield Giants: Gateshead Thunder; Sheffield Eagles

JJB Sports Super League IV was the official name for the year 1999's Super League championship season, the 105th season of top-level professional rugby league football in Britain, and the fourth championship run by the Super League. The start of Super League IV saw the emergence of a North East based Rugby League Club, Gateshead Thunder as well as newly promoted Wakefield Trinity Wildcats to expand the league to fourteen teams.

== Rule changes ==
- The 40/20 rule was introduced to reward accurate kicking in general play. The rule, which had been used in Australia since 1997, gave the head and feed at the resulting scrum to a team that kicked the ball from behind their 40-metre line so that it bounced in the field of play before going into touch behind their opponent's 20 metre line.

== Teams ==
Legend
Reigning Champions
Promoted

Team	Stadium	Capacity	City/Area
Bradford Bulls	Odsal	27,000	Bradford, West Yorkshire
Castleford Tigers	Wheldon Road	11,750	Castleford, West Yorkshire
Gateshead Thunder	Gateshead International Stadium	11,800	Gateshead, Tyne and Wear
Halifax Blue Sox	Thrum Hall	9,832	Halifax, West Yorkshire
Huddersfield Giants	Galpharm Stadium	24,500	Huddersfield, West Yorkshire
Hull Sharks	The Boulevard	10,500	Hull, East Riding of Yorkshire
Leeds Rhinos	Headingley	21,500	Leeds, West Yorkshire
London Broncos	The Valley	27,000	Charlton, Greater London
Salford Reds	The Willows	11,363	Salford, Greater Manchester
Sheffield Eagles	Don Valley Stadium	25,000	Sheffield, South Yorkshire
St. Helens	Knowsley Road	17,500	St Helens, Merseyside
Warrington Wolves	Wilderspool	9,200	Warrington, Cheshire
Wigan Warriors	Central Park	18,000	Wigan, Greater Manchester

== Table ==
Pos	Team	Pld	W	D	L	PF	PA	PD	Pts	Qualification
1	Bradford Bulls (L)	30	25	1	4	897	445	+452	51	Semi Final
2	St Helens (C)	30	23	0	7	1034	561	+473	46	Qualifying Semi Final
3	Leeds Rhinos	30	22	1	7	910	558	+352	45	Qualifying Semi Final
4	Wigan Warriors	30	21	1	8	877	390	+487	43	Elimination Semi Final
5	Castleford Tigers	30	19	3	8	712	451	+261	41	Elimination Semi Final
6	Gateshead Thunder	30	19	1	10	775	576	+199	39	
7	Warrington Wolves	30	15	1	14	700	717	−17	31	
8	London Broncos	30	13	2	15	644	708	−64	28	
9	Halifax Blue Sox	30	11	0	19	573	792	−219	22	
10	Sheffield Eagles	30	10	1	19	518	818	−300	21	
11	Wakefield Trinity Wildcats	30	10	0	20	608	795	−187	20	
12	Salford Reds	30	6	1	23	526	916	−390	13	
13	Hull Sharks	30	5	0	25	422	921	−499	10	
14	Huddersfield Giants	30	5	0	25	463	1011	−548	10	

Rules for classification: 1) Points; 2) Points difference; 3) Number of points scored;
(C) Champions; (L) League Leaders

== Play-offs ==
Qualifying play-off
2	St. Helens	38
3	Leeds Rhinos	14
4	Wigan Warriors	10
5	Castleford Tigers	14

Qualifying semi-final
1	Bradford Bulls	40
St. Helens	4
Elimination semi-final
Leeds Rhinos	16
Castleford Tigers	23

Preliminary final
St. Helens	36
Castleford Tigers	6

Grand Final
Bradford Bulls	6
St. Helens	8

== See also ==
- 1999 Super League Grand Final
