= David Boyle (rugby league, born 1971) =

Australian rugby league footballer

Personal information
- Born: 3 July 1971 (age 55) Bega, New South Wales, Australia

Playing information
- Height: 180 cm (5 ft 11 in)
- Weight: 93 kg (14 st 9 lb)
- Position: Centre, Wing
Club
Years	Team	Pld	T	G	FG	P
1991–98	Canberra Raiders	117	35	2	0	144
1999–00	Bradford Bulls	56	17	0	1	69
	Total	173	52	2	1	213
- Relatives: Morgan Boyle (son); Millie Boyle (daughter); Jason Croker (brother-in-law); Lachlan Croker (nephew)

David Boyle (born 3 July 1971) is an Australian former professional rugby league footballer who played in the 1990s and 2000s. He played for the Canberra Raiders in the New South Wales Rugby League (NSWRL) competition and for the Bradford Bulls in the Super League. Boyle played in the backs, chiefly at centre. He is the father of Morgan Boyle and Millie Boyle.

== Playing career ==
=== Canberra ===
Boyle was graded by the Raiders during the 1990 season. He made his first grade debut from the bench in his sides' 20–18 win over the Gold Coast Seagulls at Bruce Stadium in round 4 of the 1991 season. Boyle also scored his first try in his debut match. He was one of the Raiders' shining prospects when the club was forced to release several star players due to salary cap problems at the end of the 1991 season. Most of the Raiders players (including Boyle himself) agreed to take a pay cut to keep the side together. The Raiders missed the finals for the first time since 1986 when they finished twelfth in the 1992 season.

The Raiders came back strongly in 1993, with their international stars Mal Meninga, Ricky Stuart, Laurie Daley, Bradley Clyde and Steve Walters, alongside tryscoring Fijian sensation Noa Nadruku (22 tries for the season) leading the way. Canberra finished third after the regular season, and were premiership favorites until their fateful round 21 match with the hapless Parramatta at Bruce Stadium. Halfback Ricky Stuart badly broke and dislocated his right ankle in the second half and despite a club record 68–0 win, without their chief playmaker, Canberra fell apart. They lost their last regular season game to the Canterbury-Bankstown Bulldogs 32–8, before meekly going out in straight sets in the finals with losses to eventual Grand Finalists the St. George Dragons and premiers Brisbane Broncos.

In the 1994 season, the Raiders once again finished third in the regular season, and went on to win their third premiership title. In the 1994 Grand Final against Canterbury in which Canberra won 36–12, Boyle, along with Jason Death were both listed on the four-man interchange bench, but were not used in the game. In the 1995 season, Canberra finished second after losing only two matches in the regular season, and once again looked like title contenders. They lost in the preliminary final to Canterbury 25–6. In the 1998 season, his final season at the Canberra club, Boyle had his best season, after playing in 22 of their 26 games, he finished the season with 11 tries second only to Mark McLinden. Boyle left Canberra at the conclusion of the 1998 season.

=== Bradford Bulls ===
In 1999, Boyle joined English Super League side Bradford. After playing 56 games and scoring 17 tries for the Bulls, Boyle decided to retire at the end of the 2000 Super League season.

=== Country ===
After he retired from Super League, Boyle served as captain-coach of Narooma Devils in the Group 16 competition, leading them to the Clayton Cup in 2003.
