= List of St Helens R.F.C. players =

St Helens R.F.C. is a professional rugby league club in St Helens, Merseyside. Formed in 1873, St Helens are one of the 22 original members of the Northern Rugby Football Union founded in 1895. Since then, more than 1,200 players have appeared for the club's first team. Kel Coslett has made the most career appearances for St Helens, having played 531 games between 1962 and 1976. Coslett is also the club's all-time top goal scorer (1,639) and point scorer (3,413). The try scoring record is held by Tom van Vollenhoven, who touched down 392 times for the club.

The following is a list of St Helens R.F.C. players. Players are listed alphabetically. Appearances are for first-team competitive matches only.

== Players ==
Last updated: 19 September 2026

Heritage #	Name	Club Career	Apps	Tries	Goals	DGs	Points	Notes
215	Jack Ackerley	1911	2	0	0	0	0	
163	George Acourt	1907–1908	3	0	0	0	0	
693	Billy Adair	1950–1951	2	0	0	0	0	
726	Billy Adams	1955	1	0	0	0	0	
1089	Phil Adamson	1999	3	0	0	0	0	
974	Gary Ainsworth	1985	12	8	0	0	32	
1113	Darren Albert	2002–2005	124	88	0	0	336	wing
129	John Allen	1903	11	0	0	0	0	
4	Joseph Allen	1895–1896	11	0	0	0	0	
962	Shaun Allen	1983–1989	154	18	0	0	72	
1213	Kyle Amor	2014–2022	168	18	0	0	72	Prop. Début 13 Feb 2014 v Warrington Wolves
1067	Paul Anderson	1995–1998	88	6	2	0	28	
1149	Paul Anderson	2005–2006	68	10	1	0	42	
1150	Vinnie Anderson	2005–2006	42	16	0	0	64	Centre, Five-eighth, Loose forward. Début 11 Mar 2005 v Salford City Reds.
1139	Philip Anderton	2004	1	0	0	0	0	
521	J. Andrews	1941	4	0	0	0	0	
3	John Appleton	1895–1902	71	11	1	1	39	
1280	Ellis Archer	2022	1	0	0	0	0	scrum-half. Début on 29 Aug 2022 v Wakefield Trinity
39	Fred Archer	1896–1899	23	7	0	0	21	
931	Chris Arkwright	1978–1990	273	90	0	0	322	
370	Jack Arkwright	1928–1934	174	39	21	0	159	
800	John Arkwright	1962	14	0	0	0	0	
178	James Armstrong	1908	9	0	0	0	0	
1174	Tom Armstrong	2009–2010	15	10	0	0	40	
1060	Danny Arnold	1995–1997	75	50	1	0	202	
1160	Craig Ashall	2006	1	1	0	0	4	
261	Thomas Ashall	1916–1919	17	2	0	0	6	
775	Bill Ashall	1960	1	0	0	0	0	
281	William Ashburner	1921–1922	20	2	2	0	10	
9	Ned Ashcroft	1895–1900	23	0	0	0	0	
167	John Ashcroft	1907–1910	2	0	0	0	0	
788	Keith Ashcroft	1961–1963	25	1	0	0	3	
1189	Nathan Ashe	2011–2013	12	1	0	0	4	
913	Alan Ashton	1975–1977	67	6	1	3	23	
1177	Matty Ashurst	2009–2011	60	10	0	0	40	
1222	Jack Ashworth	2015–2020	46	4	0	0	16	
655	John Aspinall	1946–1949	65	12	0	0	36	
249	Joe Aspinwall	1915–1919	11	1	0	0	3	
503	Len Aston	1939–1950	125	26	9	0	96	
1080	Paul Atcheson	1998–2000	70	19	0	0	76	
900	Tony Atherton	1973	1	0	0	0	0	
623	Eric Atherton	1944–1945	3	0	0	0	0	
569	Jack Atherton	1942–1944	5	0	0	0	0	
1017	Peter Atherton	1989–1993	3	0	0	0	0	
310	Bob Atkin	1922–1935	401	9	0	0	27	
589	Harry Atkinson	1943	2	0	0	0	0	
149	James Atkinson	1906–1908	45	2	0	0	6	
717	Eric Ayles	1953–1955	48	4	0	0	12	
109	Ned Bacon	1902–1904	15	4	0	0	12	
344	Eric Bailey	1925–1926	4	0	0	0	0	
976	Mark Bailey	1985–1992	128	36	0	0	144	
1221	Ricky Bailey	2015–2018	2	0	0	0	0	
377	William Bailey	1929–1930	8	0	0	0	0	
572	Joe Ball	1943–1955	135	14	152	0	346	
842	Len Ball	1966	1	0	0	0	0	
494	Frank Balmer	1939–1948	68	13	0	0	0	
111	Ralph Banks	1902–1907	95	6	2	0	22	
477	Tom Banks	1937	8	0	0	0	0	
1164	Stephen Bannister	2006–2007	3	0	0	0	0	
1240	Ben Barba	2017–2018	34	34	0	0	136	
230	George Barker	1913	5	0	0	0	0	
197	Berlin Barnes	1909	3	0	0	0	0	
347	Gerald Barnes	1926	1	0	0	0	0	
31	Jim Barnes	1896–1905	141	31	19	0	131	
806	Tony Barrow	1963–1970	112	38	0	0	114	
779	Frank Barrow	1961–1972	244	13	3	0	45	
1076	Scott Barrow	1997–2000	23	2	0	0	88	
866	William Barrow	1970	1	0	0	0	0	
43	Jack Barton	1896	1	0	0	0	0	
130	Tom Barton	1904–1921	226	97	118	0	527	
1249	Joe Batchelor	2019–2025	59	15	0	0	60	Second-row
143	Isaac Bate	1905–1909	34	4	0	0	12	
504	William Bate	1940–1945	28	8	0	0	24	
1018	Andrew Bateman	1989–1990	27	5	0	0	20	
681	Eric Battersby	1949	2	0	0	0	0	
1274	Lewis Baxter	2022-2023	3	0	0	0	0	Second-row. Signed from local outfit Wigan St Judes ARLFC, and joined Leigh Leopards in 2024
943	Steve Bayliss	1980–1987	52	16	0	0	48	Wing, Centre
794	Alan Beddow	1962	3	0	0	0	0	
183	George Bedworth	1909	5	0	0	0	0	
255	Isaac Beech	1919–1920	12	1	0	0	3	
466	Edward Beesley	1937–1940	13	1	0	0	3	
665	Frank Beesley	1947–1950	46	3	0	0	9	
1270	James Bell	2022–2025	71	9	0	0	36	loose forward, second-row, hooker. New Zealander. Début on 15 Apr 2022 v Wigan Warriors
684	Derek Bellard	1949–1950	4	0	0	0	0	
203	William Belshaw	1910–1913	81	26	3	0	84	
1100	Mike Bennett	2000–2008	161	16	0	0	64	
658	Trialist Bennett	1946	1	0	0	0	0	
1263	Jon Bennison	2021–2025	71	29	33	0	174	fullback, wing
1244	James Bentley	2018–2022	49	9	0	0	36	Second-row
793	William Benyon	1962–1977	514	154	1	0	464	
256	Alfred Bevan	1919	3	0	0	0	0	
200	Stanley Bevan	1910	11	0	0	0	0	
1137	Ricky Bibey	2004	21	0	0	0	0	
635	Nathaniel Birch	1946	9	2	0	0	6	
898	Peter Birchall	1973	1	0	0	0	0	
855	Allan Bishop	1968–1969	8	4	0	0	12	
1028	Paul Bishop	1990–1992	51	16	70	11	215	Son of Tommy Bishop
830	Tommy Bishop	1966–1969	135	47	17	0	175	Father of Paul Bishop
430	Cyril Blacklaws	1935	37	2	2	0	10	
278	George Blackledge	1920	1	0	0	0	0	
848	Robert Blackwood	1968–1971	22	7	0	0	21	
1284	Waqa Blake	2024	23	11	0	0	44	Centre
662	Reg Blakemore	1947–1954	187	20	0	0	60	
724	Billy Blan	1955	17	2	7	0	20	
1005	Darren Bloor	1988–1989	27	7	0	1	29	
150	John Bocock	1906–1907	8	0	0	0	0	
40	William Bold	1896	1	0	0	0	0	
156	William Bold	1907–1908	7	0	0	0	0	
928	Anthony Bolton	1978–1982	26	0	0	0	0	
1050	Simon Booth	1994–1997	47	7	0	0	28	
1140	Liam Bostock	2004	1	0	0	0	0	hooker
932	Gary Bottell	1978–1985	91	8	0	0	25	
1023	Mark Bourneville	1990	5	0	0	0	0	
761	Eddie Bowden	1959–1960	19	0	0	0	0	
523	Elwyn Bowen	1941–1947	28	6	2	0	22	
103	Francis Bowen	1901	1	0	0	0	0	
409	Frank Bowen	1933	5	0	0	0	0	
350	Thomas Bowen	1927–1931	23	3	5	0	19	
963	Michael Bowes	1983–1984	3	0	0	0	0	
1108	Radney Bowker	2001	1	0	0	0	0	
615	Frank Bowyer	1944–1945	8	0	0	0	0	
66	Patrick Boyle	1898–1902	78	7	1	0	23	
1147	Andy Bracek	2004	1	0	0	0	0	
74	Richard Bracken	1898–1899	3	0	0	0	0	
158	Jesse Bradburn	1907	5	0	0	0	0	
427	Jack Bradbury	1934–1941; 1942–1946	231	65	0	0	195	
254	Harold Bradbury	1919–1922	49	16	0	0	48	
1110	John Braddish	2001–2002	2	0	3	0	6	
184	William Bradley	1909–1910	50	4	0	0	12	
590	Tommy Bradshaw	1943	1	0	0	0	0	
337	William Brennan	1925–1927	36	0	0	0	0	
695	William Bretherton	1950–1956	158	10	0	0	30	
138	John Brierley	1904	7	0	0	0	0	
764	Alan Briers	1959–1962	71	17	0	0	51	
208	Benjamin Briers	1919–1925	199	15	3	0	51	
1074	Lee Briers	1997	6	1	24	0	52	
83	Thomas Briers	1899–1903	33	0	0	0	0	
11	William Briers	1895–1912	463	109	0	0	327	
749	Brian Briggs	1958–1960	83	4	11	0	34	
463	Harold Briscoe	1937–1940	85	8	0	0	24	
241	John Briscoe	1914	3	1	0	0	3	
1115	Darren Britt	2002–2003	51	4	0	0	16	
608	Stan Brogden	1944	4	4	0	0	12	
750	Edward Brophy	1958	2	0	0	0	0	
873	David Brown	1971–1974	22	12	0	0	36	
755	Derek Brown	1958–1960	32	1	2	0	7	
666	Frank Brown	1947–1948	4	0	0	0	0	
903	Peter Brown	1974–1977	5	0	0	0	0	
553	Bob Brown	1942	1	0	0	0	0	
21	Joseph Brownbill	1895–1898	38	2	0	0	6	
946	Paul Brownbill	1980–1982	11	0	0	0	0	
219	Thomas Browning	1912–1914	62	14	4	0	50	
1277	McKenzie Buckley	2022–present	1	0	0	0	0	prop. Début on 22 Apr 2022 v Castleford Tigers
814	Bob Burdell	1963–1965	24	1	0	0	3	
145	Arthur Burgess	1905	1	0	0	0	0	
966	Anthony Burke	1983–1989	216	23	0	0	92	
63	Edward Burke	1898	1	0	0	0	0	
397	James Burke	1931–1932	9	0	0	0	0	
58	William Burke	1897	3	0	0	0	0	
389	Henry Burnell	1930–1931	7	1	0	0	3	
1288	Jake Burns	2024–present	6	2	0	0	8	Hooker
327	James Burns	1924	4	2	0	0	6	
1219	Travis Burns	2016–2017	34	4	28	0	72	
282	Henry Burrows	1921–1924	21	5	0	0	15	
1059	Dean Busby	1995–1998	28	3	0	0	12	
416	Albert Butler	1933–1948	232	16	27	0	102	
394	Edward Butler	1931–1936	63	15	17	0	79	
950	John Butler	1981–1984	47	9	0	0	28	
205	William Butterfield	1910–1912	55	2	0	0	6	
343	Thomas Byrne	1925	2	0	0	0	0	
162	Thomas Byrom	1907–1908	3	0	0	0	0	
552	Harry Caldwell	1942	5	3	0	0	9	
691	Ray Cale	1950–1954	122	25	0	0	75	
899	David Campbell	1974–1977	17	8	0	0	24	
1315	Jack Campbell	2026–present	1	2	0	0	8	Fullback, Wing. Début 17 Jul 2026 v Catalans Dragons
938	John Canning	1979–1981	12	3	2	0	13	
1070	Brian Capewell	1996	2	0	3	0	6	
715	Frank Carlton	1953–1960	156	129	0	0	387	
533	Unknown Carney	1942	1	0	0	0	0	
53	James Carney	1897–1905	178	7	6	0	33	
384	John Carr	1930–1931	25	3	0	0	9	
1006	Michael Carrington	1988–1989	10	3	0	0	12	
633	Danny Carter	1945–1946	3	1	0	0	3	
440	Reg Carter	1935–1936	3	0	0	0	0	
1312	Jed Cartwright	2026–present	2	1	0	0	4	Prop, Second-row. Début 12 Jul 2026 v Toulouse Olympique
796	George Case	1962	3	0	0	0	0	
605	Peter Case	1944	1	0	0	0	0	
1034	Sean Casey	1992–1994	14	4	0	0	16	
12	William Caveney	1895–1900	83	1	0	0	3	
300	Frank Cawley	1922	3	0	0	0	0	
568	Albert Cawtheray	1943	2	0	0	0	0	
1154	Jason Cayless	2006–2009	71	7	0	0	28	
404	Alfred Chadwick	1933–1934	4	0	0	0	0	
535	John Chadwick	1942	1	0	0	0	0	
67	Job Chapman	1898–1901	40	2	0	0	6	
902	Christopher Charles	1974–1977	45	3	0	0	9	
1205	Lewis Charnock	2013–2016	6	2	8	0	24	
207	Christopher Chavasse	1910	6	3	0	0	9	Wing; OBE, MC, TD, ChStJ; During World War I, Chavasse served as a chaplain in the Royal Army Chaplains' Department.
563	Edwin Cheetham	1942–1951	25	12	0	0	36	
232	Frederick Cheshire	1913–1914	26	2	20	0	46	
464	David Chisnall	1937	5	2	0	0	6	
922	Dave Chisnall	1977–1979	114	12	0	0	36	
840	Eric Chisnall	1967–1982	523	70	0	0	210	
211	Albert Clare	1911	6	1	0	0	3	
270	William Clarey	1919–1930	252	13	1	0	41	
987	Brett Clark	1986–1987	36	19	0	0	76	
1285	Daryl Clark	2024–present	16	7	0	0	28	Hooker
1095	Des Clark	1999	4	0	0	0	0	
50	Joseph Clark	1897	3	0	0	0	0	
741	Samuel Clemson	1957	2	0	0	0	0	
739	George Clifton	1957	1	1	0	0	3	
584	Harold Clough	1943–1944	18	6	0	0	18	
1151	Paul Clough	2004–2014	189	24	0	0	96	
258	Joseph Coatsworth	1919	1	0	0	0	0	
195	John Cochrane	1910	1	0	0	0	0	
340	Percy Coldrick	1925–1926	17	1	0	0	3	
246	Charles Collins	1915–1920	21	3	11	0	31	
978	Ross Conlon	1985–1986	16	9	65	0	166	
1010	Gary Connolly	1988–1993	133	46	0	0	184	
1022	Ian Connor	1989–1993	11	0	0	0	0	
653	Leonard Constance	1946–1949	66	7	4	0	29	
1142	Peter Cook	2004	1	0	0	0	0	
476	Albert Cooper	1938	3	0	0	0	0	
405	Edward Cooper	1932	2	0	0	0	0	
326	Henry Cooper	1924	1	0	0	0	0	
1002	Shane Cooper	1987–1995	271	76	0	6	310	New Zealander
1246	Lachlan Coote	2019–2021	66	34	284	1	705	Fullback. Australian
316	Unknown Corbett	1923	1	0	0	0	0	
699	Bill Corbett	1951	3	0	0	0	0	
1281	Rio-Osayomwanbo Corkill	2022	1	0	0	0	0	stand-off. Début 29 Sep 2022 v Wakefield Trinity
285	Peter Corns	1921	1	0	0	0	0	
1009	David Cosgrove	1988–1991	32	3	0	0	12	
797	Kel Coslett	1962–1976	531	49	1,639	0	3,413	
1242	Matty Costello	2018–2020	28	6	0	0	24	
387	David Cotton	1930–1944	168	9	0	0	27	
321	George Cotton	1923–1927	83	40	1	0	122	
391	Solomon Cotton	1931–1933	16	0	0	0	0	
907	Neil Courtney	1975–1979	55	3	0	0	9	
1040	Riki Cowan	1993	4	0	0	0	0	
881	Brian Coward	1972–1973	5	1	0	0	3	
1299	Leon Cowen	2025–present	1	0	0	0	0	centre. Début on 17 Jul 2025 v Leigh Leopards
638	Jack Cox	1946	5	1	0	0	3	
99	Charles Creevey	1901–1910	143	56	52	0	272	
113	James Creevey	1902–1908	49	11	17	0	67	
153	Matt Creevey	1906–1919	125	15	15	0	75	
192	Thomas Crellin	1909–1912	33	2	0	0	6	
860	David Critchley	1969–1970	5	4	0	0	12	
753	Ernie Critchley	1958	9	2	0	0	6	
268	Charles Crooks	1919–1930	290	23	19	0	107	
1077	Alan Cross	1997	2	0	0	0	0	
417	Arthur Cross	1933–1942	97	9	0	0	27	
1298	Deon Cross	2025–present	13	5	0	0	20	centre. Début on 3 Mar 2025 v Leeds Rhinos
277	James Cross	1920–1923	22	1	0	0	3	
6	William Cross	1895–1901	74	1	3	0	9	
82	James Crossley	1899–1900	4	0	0	0	0	
1107	Heath Cruckshank	2001–2002	13	0	0	0	0	
697	Alan Cullis	1951–1952	7	2	0	0	6	
461	James Cunliffe	1937–1938	42	3	0	0	9	
457	Joseph Cunliffe	1936–1937	2	0	0	0	0	
904	Eddie Cunningham	1975–1979	100	45	0	0	135	
1065	Gareth Cunningham	1995–1996	2	0	0	0	0	
1052	Keiron Cunningham	1994–2000	496	175	0	0	700	
910	Tommy Cunningham	1974–1978	3	0	0	0	0	
528	George Curran	1941–1944	6	0	0	0	0	
544	Unknown Cuthbert	1942	1	0	0	0	0	
1294	Owen Dagnall	2021–present	12	8	0	0	32	wing, centre. Début on 8 Feb 2025 v West Hull in the Challenge Cup
770	Robert Dagnall	1960–1967	211	8	0	0	24	
993	Ian Dainteth	1987	1	0	0	0	0	
13	Peter Dale	1895–1902	185	13	0	0	39	
107	John Dancer	1902	1	0	0	0	0	
194	Samuel Daniels	1910–1919	66	6	0	0	18	
1045	Andy Dannatt	1993–1995	41	2	0	0	4	
1085	Paul Davidson	1998–1999	46	8	0	0	32	
714	Alec Davies	1953–1956	4	7	0	0	21	
1255	Ben Davies	2020–2025	18	8	0	0	34	Centre
363	Dai Davies	1926–1928	29	4	0	0	12	
1301	Jake Davies	2025–present	2	0	0	0	0	second-row. Début on 19 Sep 2025 v Castleford Tigers
495	George Davies	1939–1947	184	7	0	0	21	
549	James A Davies	1942–1944	15	0	0	0	0	
558	James W Davies	1942	1	0	0	0	0	
424	Islwyn Davies	1934–1937	106	39	48	0	213	
813	Lance Davies	1964	1	0	0	0	0	
1224	Olly Davies	2015–2017	2	0	0	0	0	
348	Peter Davies	1926–1930	5	1	0	0	3	
32	William Davies	1896–1897	4	0	0	0	0	
1215	Matty Dawson-Jones	2014–2016	50	16	0	0	64	
968	Sean Day	1984–1986	47	14	191	0	438	
271	Ralph Deakin	1919–1920	7	2	0	0	6	
1169	Chris Dean	2007–2010	23	10	0	0	40	
1276	George Delaney	2022–present	77	2	0	0	8	prop. Début v Castleford Tigers 22 Apr 2022. George progressed through the Scholarship and Academy pathway at the Saints
723	Walter Delves	1954–1958	102	22	0	0	66	
624	William Delves	1944	3	0	0	0	0	
360	George Dennett	1927–1929	22	4	0	0	12	
676	William Derbyshire	1948	1	0	0	0	0	
560	Joe Desborough	1942	3	1	0	0	3	
131	Sam Devereux	1904	8	0	0	0	0	
599	Harry Devine	1944	2	0	0	0	0	
1066	Nicholas Devine	1995	1	0	0	0	0	
992	Sean Devine	1986–1990	39	10	48	0	136	
598	Joe Dewsnip	1943	3	1	0	0	3	
1307	Jordan Dezaria	2026-2026	1	0	0	0	0	Prop. On loan from Hull KR. Début v Wigan Warriors in Good Friday derby
114	David Dickinson	1902	5	0	0	0	0	
698	John Dickinson	1950–1957	160	42	2	0	130	stand-off. "Todder". Sold to Leigh RLFC
647	Vincent Dilorenzo	1946–1948	10	0	0	0	0	hooker. At the end of his long career, having spent most time at Bradford Northern
1176	Andrew Dixon	2009–2012	67	13	0	0	52	loose forward. Played in the 2011 Super League Grand Final; Signed for Salford Red Devils in 2013
512	Eli Dixon	1940–1942	19	2	0	0	6	stand-off
656	Jack Dixon	1946–1948	60	8	0	0	24	loose forward
702	Russ Dobbs	1951	3	1	0	0	3	right wing. Signed from Pontypool RFC
1253	Lewis Dodd	2020–2024	42	16	11	1	87	scrum-half, hooker. Début 29 Sep 2020 v Wigan Warriors
985	Paul Doherty	1985–1988	17	6	0	1	25	
2	Robert Doherty	1895–1902	225	38	0	0	114	
35	Albert Dolan	1895–1896	2	0	0	0	0	
106	James Dolan	1901–1905	3	0	0	0	0	
117	Patrick Dolan	1902–1906	34	0	0	0	0	
283	Peter Donaldson	1920	1	0	0	0	0	
89	Walter Done	1900–1902	2	0	0	0	0	
1012	Austin Donegan	1988–1990	7	1	0	0	4	
773	Joseph Donegan	1960–1964	6	1	0	0	3	
772	John Donovan	1959–1962	34	12	4	0	44	
434	John Dorning	1934	1	0	0	0	0	
1311	Jacob Douglas	2026–present	4	1	0	0	4	Wing. Début 27 Jun 2026 v Bradford Bulls
1236	Luke Douglas	2017	59	6	0	0	24	
836	Peter Douglas	1966–1967	47	16	0	0	48	
582	William Dowd	1943	4	0	0	0	0	
372	Eddie Dowdall	1929–1930	35	1	0	0	3	
507	Albert Doyle	1940–1947	89	68	7	0	218	
398	Robert Doyle	1931	1	0	0	0	0	
157	Frank Drake	1907–1908	8	0	0	0	0	
136	Alec Duffy	1904	10	1	0	0	3	
445	Patrick Dullard	1935–1937	22	1	0	0	3	
227	Thomas Durkin	1912–1920	85	17	0	0	51	
682	Les Dutton	1948	3	0	0	0	0	
973	Bernard Dwyer	1984–1995	232	39	60	1	277	
871	Kelvin Earl	1970–1972	10	2	0	0	6	
1167	Kyle Eastmond	2007–2011	74	39	137	3	433	
1251	Josh Eaves	2019–2021	4	1	0	0	4	Hooker. Début Jul 2019 v London Broncos
888	David Eckersley	1972–1975	124	60	5	0	190	
795	Fred Eckersley	1961	1	0	0	0	0	
314	Ernest Eden	1922	2	0	0	0	0	
895	Gordon Edgerton	1973	5	0	0	0	0	
1091	Mark Edmondson	1999–2005	117	16	0	0	64	
133	David Edmunds	1904	17	0	2	0	4	
802	Joe Egan	1962–1969	26	1	0	0	3	hooker. Son of Joe Egan
982	Mark Elia	1985–1987	74	50	2	0	204	
625	Glyn Elias	1944	1	0	0	0	0	
345	Alf Ellaby	1926–1934	289	280	0	0	840	wing
489	Fred Ellaby	1938	9	0	0	0	0	second-row. No relation to Alf Ellaby
1179	Jamie Ellis	2008–2010	3	0	1	0	2	
273	Edward Ellison	1919	2	0	0	0	0	
1173	Jacob Emmitt	2008–2010	19	1	0	0	4	
782	David Evans	1960	1	0	0	0	0	
571	Unknown Evans	1942-1944	2	1	0	0	3	
166	Jonathan Evans	1907	5	0	0	0	0	
1313	Matty Evans	2026–present	8	0	0	0	0	Prop, Second-row. Début 12 Jul 2026 v Toulouse Olympique
999	Stuart Evans	1987–1990	80	7	0	0	28	
20	Billy Ewan	1895	25	0	0	0	0	
1138	Maurie Fa'asavalu	2004–2010	163	39	0	0	156	second-row, centre
1230	Théo Fages	2016–2021	139	39	0	4	160	Scrum-half, Stand-off, Hooker. Début 11 Feb 2016 v Salford Red Devils
104	Fred Fairbourn	1901	7	0	0	0	0	
592	Unknown Fairclough	1943	1	1	0	0	3	
1026	Andrew Fairclough	1990	4	1	0	0	4	
937	David Fairclough	1979–1985	7	0	0	0	0	
284	Les Fairclough	1920–1932	355	84	3	0	258	
188	James Fairclough	1908	1	0	0	0	0	
286	Ralph Fairhurst	1920–1925	15	0	3	0	6	
336	Henry Fairhurst	1932–1935	23	0	0	0	0	
1102	David Fairleigh	2001	32	8	0	0	32	
359	Thomas Farnall	1927	3	0	0	0	0	
706	Ray Farnall	1951	1	0	0	0	0	
425	James Farrar	1934–1937	47	0	0	0	0	
245	George Farrimond	1914–1922	122	13	9	0	57	
751	Peter Fearis	1958	35	8	165	0	354	
452	Jack Fearnley	1936–1945	142	36	11	0	130	
1133	Dominic Fe'aunati	2004	20	8	0	0	32	wing
1296	Kyle Feldt	2025–2026	18	21	32	0	148	wing. Début on 8 Feb 2025 v West Hull in the Challenge Cup
1112	Leon Felton	2001	2	0	0	0	0	
1033	Tony Fenlon	1991–1993	3	0	1	0	2	
955	Stephen Fenney	1981–1982	6	0	0	0	0	
989	John Fieldhouse	1986–1989	58	7	0	0	28	
634	Wilf Fields	1945	1	0	0	0	0	
388	Albert Fildes	1930–1934	129	19	0	0	57	
22	George Fildes	1895	26	1	0	0	3	
705	Tommy Finn	1951	8	1	0	0	3	
687	William Finnan	1949–1958	124	58	0	0	174	
500	Harry Finney	1939–1944	34	7	3	0	27	
531	Unknown Finney	1942	1	1	0	0	3	
783	Thomas Finney	1960–1961	3	0	0	0	0	
223	Arthur Fisher	1912–1918	21	0	0	0	0	
308	Henry Fisher	1922–1925	14	0	0	0	0	
502	Harold Fishwick	1939–1948	132	9	15	0	57	
490	William Fishwick	1938–1947	76	10	15	0	60	
171	Jimmy Flanagan	1908–1914	231	125	3	0	381	
1195	Mark Flanagan	2012–2015	87	10	3	0	40	
1168	Chris Flannery	2007–2012	137	42	0	0	168	
1223	Matty Fleming	2015–2017	18	7	0	0	28	
252	John Fletcher	1915–1918	1	0	0	0	0	
400	William Fletcher	1932–1936	47	1	12	0	27	
305	Tommy Flynn	1922–1925	122	38	5	0	124	
69	Christophe Flynn	1898	2	0	0	0	0	
1041	Adam Fogerty	1993–1996	69	13	0	0	52	
1144	Carl Forber	2004	1	0	6	0	12	
473	James Forber	1937	1	0	0	0	0	
957	Paul Forber	1982–1992	247	50	7	1	215	
744	Edward Forshaw	1957	6	3	11	0	31	
1192	Carl Forster	2011-2014	5	0	0	0	0	
460	Harold Forsyth	1936–1945	31	6	0	0	18	
1181	Jamie Foster	2008–2012	53	34	241	0	618	
527	Hugh Foster	1941	1	0	0	0	0	
1257	Matty Foster	2020–2023	1	0	0	0	0	Second-row. Début 26 Oct 2020 v Salford Red Devils
1	Thomas Foulkes	1895–1905	301	3	32	0	82	
618	John Fox	1944	1	0	0	0	0	
1217	Matty Fozard	2014–2016	1	0	0	0	0	
1134	Nick Fozzard	2004–2008	145	10	0	0	40	
925	Bill Francis	1977–1978	73	22	0	0	66	
455	Bob Fraser	1936	8	0	1	0	2	
614	Roy Free	1944	1	0	0	0	0	
977	Brett French	1985	24	14	0	0	56	
786	Ray French	1961–1967	204	10	0	0	30	
574	William French	1943–1946	62	8	2	0	28	
312	Alf Frodsham	1922–1929	215	88	4	0	272	
659	Eric Frodsham	1946–1947	33	1	0	0	3	
368	Harry Frodsham	1928–1935	197	21	1	0	65	
1015	Tommy Frodsham	1989–1990	21	8	0	0	32	
1170	Gareth Frodsham	2008–2011	11	0	0	0	0	
259	Peter Furlong	1918	1	0	0	0	0	
189	John Gallagher	1908	1	0	0	0	0	second-row
239	Peter Gallagher	1914	2	0	0	0	0	second-row, prop
492	Thomas Gandy	1938	1	0	0	0	0	scrum-half
686	Max Garbler	1949–1956	70	9	0	0	27	second-row. Signed from Randwick DRUFC
1117	Ade Gardner	2002–2014	286	173	0	0	692	wing
408	Les Garner	1933–1934	118	6	2	0	22	second-row
481	William Garner	1937–1941	24	6	0	0	18	second-row. No relation to Les Garner
825	Peter Gartland	1964–1969	24	2	2	0	10	scrum-half. Later became Saints assistant coach to Billy Benyon
393	John Garvey	1931–1933	119	52	1	0	158	centre, stand-off
262	Henry Gaskell	1918–1919	7	0	0	0	0	prop
720	Josh Gaskell	1953–1956	50	11	0	0	33	prop
1184	Lee Gaskell	2010–2013	43	14	12	1	81	stand-off
997	Neil Gavin	1986	1	0	0	0	0	
781	Johnny Gaydon	1960–1961	13	5	0	0	15	wing, centre. Rhodesian-born from S.Africa
581	Douglas Gee	1943–1945	10	1	0	0	3	
954	Bryan Gelling	1981–1984	14	1	0	0	4	
396	James Gerrard	1931–1932	2	0	0	0	0	
46	Joseph Gerrard	1896	7	0	0	0	0	
1049	Scott Gibbs	1994–1996	48	23	0	0	92	centre
1165	Matthew Gidley	2007–2010	123	48	6	0	204	centre. Nicknamed "Flick". Signed from Newcastle Knights to replace Jamie Lyon
1120	Christopher Giles	2002	1	0	0	0	0	Joined Widnes Vikings
1278	Keane Gilford	2022–present	1	0	0	0	0	wing. Début on 29 Aug 2022 v Wakefield Trinity
1135	Lee Gilmour	2004–2009	178	52	0	0	208	centre. "Gilly".
8	John Gladwin	1895–1898	53	3	0	0	9	second-row. Played in the first Northern Union fixture v Rochdale Hornets
1114	Martin Gleeson	2002–2004	69	31	0	0	124	
867	Brian Glover	1970–1971	19	8	0	0	24	hooker, wing. Joined Rochdale Hornets
415	Charles Glover	1933–1935	52	14	24	0	90	centre, scrum-half. Joined Liverpool Stanley
617	John Glover	1944	1	0	0	0	0	right wing
944	Mick Glover	1979–1981	6	0	0	0	0	hooker
209	Richard Glover	1910	2	1	0	0	3	wing
29	Patrick Glynn	1895	1	0	0	0	3	
906	Peter Glynn	1975–1982	258	118	86	5	531	
896	Steve Gobey	1973	2	1	0	0	3	centre
603	Henry Goddard	1943	3	0	0	0	0	prop, second-row
803	Peter Goddard	1962–1963	20	1	0	0	3	prop. Peter died on 2 April 2001; aged 78
172	George Godfrey	1908	4	0	0	0	0	second-row. Signed from London Irish RU
1082	Brett Goldspink	1998	27	2	0	0	8	prop. Son of Australian international Kevin Goldspink
607	James Goodier	1943–1945	5	0	0	0	0	hooker
24	Jonathan Goodman	1895	22	2	0	3	18	centre
588	Billy Gore	1943	1	0	0	0	0	second-row
942	Peter Gorley	1979–1985	234	46	0	0	150	second-row. Younger brother of Les Gorley
401	James Gorman	1932	1	0	0	0	0	centre
298	James Gormley	1921–1923	4	0	0	0	0	centre
264	Thomas Gormley	1918–1922	67	23	1	0	71	wing, centre
897	Rob Goulding	1973	2	0	0	0	0	prop. Father of Bobbie Goulding
1051	Bobbie Goulding	1994–1998	117	25	548	13	1,209	scrum-half. Son of Rob Goulding, and father of Bobbie Goulding Jr.
450	Walter Gowers	1936	6	0	7	0	14	fullback. Father of Ken Gowers
1239	Regan Grace	2016–2022	141	88	0	0	252	left wing. Début 14 Apr 2017 v Wigan Warriors
334	Albert Graham	1924–1928	50	11	12	0	57	fullback
34	James Pash Graham	1895–1896	15	0	0	0	0	second-row, prop
1130	James Graham	2003–2011; 2020	229	54	0	0	216	prop. Re-joined the club in 2020 for his final season
591	Fred Green	1943–1944	10	0	0	0	0	fullback
125	Joseph Green	1903	1	0	0	0	0	hooker
441	Jimmy Green	1935–1936	10	0	0	0	0	second-row, prop
121	Moses Green	1902–1903	2	0	0	0	0	
87	Tom Green	1900	15	1	0	0	3	
59	William Green	1897–1904	99	3	0	0	9	second-row, centre
639	Doug Greenall	1945–1959	487	188	14	0	592	centre
235	Henry Greenall	1913–1919	63	24	0	0	72	centre, wing. Played in the 1915 Challenge Cup final v Huddersfield. 1st World War Player- Elder brother of both John and Billy Greenall of St. Helens Recs
809	Les Greenall	1963	19	4	0	0	12	hooker. Signed by Wigan for £750 aged 21 from St. Helens
1198	Joe Greenwood	2012–2017	77	26	0	0	104	second-row. Signed for Gold Coast Titans
176	James Greenwood	1908–1912	124	51	13	0	179	centre. Cousin of Harry Greenwood
179	Harry Greenwood	1908–1910	43	5	0	0	15	centre, stand-off. Cousin of James Greenwood
606	Aubrey Gregory	1943–1945	51	13	0	0	39	wing
124	William Gregson	1903–1904	5	0	0	0	0	fullback
37	Robert Grice	1895–1897	2	0	0	0	0	second-row, prop
979	Gary Greinke	1985-1986	13	1	0	0	4	
402	Tom Griffin	1932–1933	34	7	0	0	21	loose forward. Ex-Irish RU who appeared as ‘A.Newman’ for his first trial game on 24 December 1932
936	Clive Griffiths	1979–1983	100	11	276	8	598	fullback, wing, centre
1014	Jonathan Griffiths	1989–1995	140	39	0	0	156	stand-off
421	Oswald Griffiths	1934–1935; 1938-1939	79	6	0	0	18	centre, second-row, loose forward
570	Albert Grimes	1942–1943	4	1	0	0	3	centre, wing, scrum-half
919	John Grimes	1976	1	0	0	0	0	Drafted in for one game when the first team went on strike
958	Paul Grimes	1982–1984	50	8	0	0	28	prop, second-row
1003	Paul Groves	1987–1992	158	29	0	1	117	hooker. "Raggy"
248	Walter Groves	1917–1932	342	49	1	0	149	centre, scrum-half. "Plodder"
499	Robert Grundy	1939–1943	55	9	16	0	59	
758	Tom Grundy	1958	2	0	0	0	0	
674	Jack Grundy	1948–1949	24	1	18	0	39	
692	Don Gullick	1950–1954	140	42	0	0	126	centre. Signed from Pontypool RFC
879	Alan Gwilliam	1971–1975	47	7	0	0	21	stand-off, centre. Brother of Ken
901	Ken Gwilliam	1974–1979	151	25	0	1	76	stand-off. Brother of Alan
939	Roy Haggerty	1979–1990	363	115	0	20	443	Father of Gareth Haggerty & Kurt Haggerty. Signed for Barrow for £15,000
1046	Andy Haigh	1993–1998	84	27	0	0	108	Played in 1997 Challenge Cup final
1190	Scott Hale	2011–2012	4	1	0	0	4	second-row, prop
352	Ben Halfpenny	1927–1934	196	59	0	0	177	second-row
1093	Steve Hall	1999–2001	62	21	0	0	84	
110	Tom Hall	1902–1906	73	4	33	0	78	stand-off, scrum-half
381	Trevor Hall	1929–1932; 1934–1936	130	25	0	0	75	second-row, loose forward New Zealander
877	Ken Halliwell	1971	14	0	0	0	0	prop
986	Steve Halliwell	1986	22	16	0	0	64	centre
831	Albert Halsall	1966–1970	122	13	0	0	39	
247	Jack Halsall	1915–1922	99	20	3	0	66	stand-off, scrum-half
451	Joseph Halsall	1936	4	1	0	0	3	hooker
118	David Halstead	1902	3	0	0	0	0	centre, wing
543	Fred Hamer	1942	6	0	0	0	0	second-row, loose forward
1084	John Hamilton	1998	3	0	0	0	0	hooker
771	Leonard Hammill	1959–1960	8	0	0	0	0	prop
1061	Karle Hammond	1995–1998	111	50	0	5	205	stand-off, loose forward
486	Bert Hampson	1938	17	5	0	0	15	stand-off
969	Paul Hamson	1984	1	0	0	0	0	stand-off
1204	Jordan Hand	2013–2015	3	0	0	0	0	prop
279	William Hankinson	1915–1922	15	1	0	0	3	wing
266	Michael Hanley	1918–1920	29	3	0	0	9	wing
379	Roy Hardgrave	1929–1933	212	173	0	0	519	wing. New Zealand international
776	Andy Hardman	1960	2	0	0	0	0	prop
1129	Ian Hardman	2003–2007	47	11	8	0	60	wing
1166	Bryn Hargreaves	2007	115	8	0	0	32	
801	Bill Harper	1962	2	0	0	0	0	hooker
33	William Harper	1895–1896	1	0	0	0	0	fullback
147	Dai Harris	1905–1906	15	4	0	0	12	wing
186	Isiah Harris	1908–1909	11	2	0	0	6	
505	Arthur Harrison	1939–1942	13	0	0	0	0	
975	Dave Harrison	1985–1987	35	5	0	0	20	hooker. Ex-Waterloo RU
765	David Harrison	1959–1961	38	5	0	0	15	hooker
319	James Harrison	1923	3	0	0	0	0	"Plonker"
1004	John Harrison	1987–1994	120	11	0	0	44	
428	John W Harrison	1934–1935	6	0	0	0	0	wing
210	Plato Harrison	1910–1911	7	0	1	0	2	centre
361	Robert Harrison	1927–1930	21	4	0	0	12	loose forward
689	Viv Harrison	1949–1952	57	20	82	0	224	Ex-London Welsh RFC
522	William Harrison	1941	1	0	0	0	0	Signed in exchange for Jack Bradbury
355	William Harrop	1927	3	0	0	0	0	
807	Peter Harvey	1963–1966	120	48	8	0	144	
1303	Jackson Hastings	2026–present	26	4	93	0	202	Scrum-half, Stand-off. Début on 6 Feb 2026 v Workington Town in the Challenge Cup
301	Gus Hayes	1921–1923	61	14	1	0	44	centre, wing. Ex-Pontypool RFC
1058	Joey Hayes	1995–1998	44	29	0	0	116	wing
362	Thomas Hayes	1928	9	3	0	0	9	wing
287	William Hayes	1920	3	0	0	0	0	second-row
834	Billy Hayes	1966–1967	17	0	2	0	4	loose forward
1252	Callum Hazzard	2019	1	0	0	0	0	loose forward, second-row
313	Albert Heath	1922–1927	98	20	0	0	60	second-row
799	Jeff Heaton	1962–1963; 1969–1975	319	74	6	1	235	wing
250	Robert Heaton	1916–1918	3	0	2	0	4	stand-off
630	Thomas Heaton	1945–1947	19	0	1	0	2	second-row
212	Harry Heaton	1910–1924	199	3	0	0	9	Great great uncle of Mike Bennett
174	Ernest Helsby	1908–1910	45	2	0	0	6	second-row
636	Joe Helsby	1945	9	3	0	0	9	second-row
1097	Bryan Henare	2000–2001	20	1	0	0	4	second-row
688	Eric Hesketh	1949–1951	49	13	6	0	51	stand-off. Signed from Batley for £2175. Son of a Wigan Director who played for both Wigan & Oldham
433	Norman Hesketh	1934 – 1937; 1938	46	9	0	0	27	stand-off, centre
100	George Hibbert	1901	2	0	0	0	0	
342	Martin Hickey	1925	3	0	0	0	0	scrum-half
694	Derrick Hickman	1950–1951	8	0	0	0	0	hooker
509	Tom Hickman	1940	3	2	0	0	6	wing
818	Merv Hicks	1963–1965	67	13	2	0	43	
561	Fred Higginbottom	1942	1	0	0	0	0	
290	Fred Higgins	1944	14	1	1	0	5	second-row. WW2 guest from Widnes RLFC
290	Ned Higgins	1921–1922	39	1	0	0	3	second-row
1105	Mickey Higham	2001–2005	116	35	0	0	140	hooker
1272	Dan Hill	2022-2023	2	0	0	0	0	fullback, centre, wing. Début on 22 Apr 2022 v Castleford Tigers
374	Ebor Hill	1928–1933	103	5	0	0	15	prop, second-row
827	Freddy Hill	1965	1	0	0	0	0	prop
1131	John Hill	2003	1	0	0	0	0	
165	Robert Hill	1907–1910	47	11	1	0	35	centre, stand-off
422	Stan Hill	1934–1938	142	5	0	0	15	prop
137	William Hillen	1904–1908	107	22	4	0	74	"Gillie". centre
595	Aubrey Hillman	1943–1944	3	0	0	0	0	centre
306	Herbert Hilton	1922–1924	52	12	0	0	36	centre, wing
833	Jeff Hitchen	1965–1968	18	0	0	0	0	
514	Harry Hodge	1941–1943	16	1	0	0	3	
1032	Tommy Hodgkinson	1991–1994; 2006	15	3	0	0	12	
193	William Hodgson	1909	1	0	0	0	0	prop
829	Brian Hogan	1965–1968	53	6	0	0	18	second-row
1193	Lance Hohaia	2012-2015	81	22	0	1	89	stand-off, fullback, hooker
926	Neil Holding	1977–1989	343	145	84	44	739	scrum-half
685	Billy Holland	1949–1951	32	4	0	0	12	scrum-half
707	Douglas Holland	1951–1953	14	1	0	0	3	second-row, prop
253	John Holland	1915–1918	1	0	0	0	0	second-row
161	Herbert Holmes	1907–1908	11	1	0	0	3	loose forward. Played against the 1st ever NZ touring team in Feb 1908
407	Arthur Holsgrove	1932–1935	39	1	0	0	3	loose forward
669	James Honey	1948–1953	181	69	11	0	229	stand-off. 1953 Lancashire Cup winner against Wigan RLFC
1125	Jason Hooper	2003–2007	110	44	30	0	236	"Hoops". centre, stand-off, loose forward
905	Mick Hope	1975–1982	121	10	1	0	32	prop
339	Ivor Hopkin	1925	11	0	1	0	2	prop. Signed from Caerphilly RFC
990	Paul Hopkin	1986	3	0	0	0	0	prop
27	Charlie Hopley	1896	3	0	0	0	0	centre
1266	William Hopoate	2022-2023	31	5	0	0	20	fullback, centre
1096	Sean Hoppe	1999–2002	98	36	0	0	144	wing, centre. A record number of 35 Kiwi Test Caps (inc. St. Helens). Also represented Aotearoa Māori
594	James Hornby	1943–1946	40	2	0	0	6	prop, second-row
181	Robert Hornby	1908–1909	1	0	0	0	0	hooker
539	Bill Horton	1942–1945	19	3	0	0	9	Wing
1306	Jacob Host	2026–present	15	1	0	0	4	Second-row, Prop. Debut v Warrington Wolves on 13 Feb 2026. Australian signed from South Sydney Rabbitohs
436	William Hough	1935–1937	37	3	5	0	19	prop, second-row
740	Denis Houghton	1956	1	0	0	0	0	loose forward
839	John Houghton	1966–1972	54	9	17	0	61	fullback, stand-off
331	Louis Houghton	1924–1930	233	17	0	0	51	prop. Try scorer in the 1929-30 Challenge Cup final v Widnes RLFC
875	Steve Houghton	1971	4	1	0	0	3	centre, wing
711	Brian Howard	1952–1958	131	58	0	0	174	stand-off, centre. 1955-56 Challenge Cup final v Halifax RLFC
475	Fred Howard	1937–1939	3	0	0	0	0	hooker
914	Ray Howard	1976	1	0	0	0	0	wing. Drafted in when Saints first team went on strike
613	Fred Howarth	1944	4	0	0	0	0	
80	Joseph Howarth	1899	3	0	0	0	0	
1207	Stuart Howarth	2013	16	0	0	0	0	
756	Dick Huddart	1958–1963	209	76	0	0	228	second-row
447	Emlyn Hughes	1936–1938	71	16	5	0	58	second-row Uncle of footballer Emlyn Hughes
869	Eric Hughes	1970–1972	15	1	1	0	5	hooker. Died 17 August 2020
984	Eric Hughes	1985	13	1	0	0	4	stand-off
874	Ray Hughes	1970–1972	3	0	0	0	0	prop
920	Unknown Hughes	1976	1	0	0	0	0	Drafted in when Saints 1st team went on strike
894	David Hull	1973–1976	105	16	1	0	48	loose forward, second-row, centre
38	Robert Hull	1895–1896	5	1	0	0	3	wing
1309	Tom Humphrys	2026–present	13	1	0	0	4	hooker. Début v Hull FC on 16 Apr 2026
1011	Alan Hunte	1988–1997	244	189	0	0	756	wing
75	Billy Hunter	1898–1905	59	11	3	0	39	wing
1267	Konrad Hurrell	2022–2025	63	26	0	0	104	second-row, centre
529	Ron Hussey	1941	1	0	0	0	0	centre
458	Dick Hutchinson	1936–1938	43	1	0	0	3	loose forward
380	Lou Hutt	1929–1930	82	6	0	0	18	second-row. New Zealander with 8 caps
573	Ray Huyton	1949	14	0	8	0	16	"Ram". scrum-half
1090	Kevin Iro	1999–2001	84	42	0	0	168	
661	Robert Innes	1947–1948	3	0	0	0	0	wing
467	John Jackson	1937	1	0	0	0	0	second-row
349	Ralph Jackson	1926–1927	2	0	0	0	0	hooker
238	William Jackson	1914–1920	54	2	0	0	6	second-row
26	Billy Jacques	1895–1896	50	6	25	4	84	centre
280	George James	1920	7	0	0	0	0	centre
890	Mel James	1972–1983	305	41	0	0	123	prop
988	Pat Jarvis	1986	18	2	0	0	8	prop. Australian signed from St. George Dragons
386	Harold Jaundrill	1929	2	0	0	0	0	fullback
752	Ron Jaundrill	1958	1	0	0	0	0	second-row
520	Emlyn Jenkins	1941–1943	7	0	6	0	12	stand-off
587	Trevor Jenkins	1942–1943	1	0	0	0	0	
493	Jack Jenkinson	1938	2	0	0	0	0	hooker
365	Frank Jennion	1928–1929	4	1	0	0	3	centre
511	Albert Johnson	1940	1	1	0	0	3	wing
792	Arthur Johnson	1961–1963	12	3	0	0	9	stand-off
743	David Johnson	1957–1958	20	12	0	0	36	wing
177	Fred Johnson	1908–1909	6	1	0	0	3	second-row
453	George Johnson	1936–1937	6	0	0	0	0	prop
1075	Jason Johnson	1997–2000	3	0	0	0	0	stand-off
1183	Paul Johnson	2009-2010	2	0	0	0	0	second-row, centre
96	Samuel Johnson	1900–1905	40	0	0	0	0	"Spider". second-row, prop
123	J Johnson	1903–1905	47	11	3	0	39	centre
660	Trialist Johnson	1946–1947	1	1	0	0	3	scrum-half
426	Bert Jones	1934	14	1	0	0	3	scrum-half. Signed from Llanelli RFC
859	Berwyn Jones	1969	4	2	0	0	6	wing
366	Bob Jones	1928–1934	120	19	39	0	135	centre, stand-off, scrum-half
378	Frank Jones	1929	12	1	1	0	5	
122	Fred Jones	1902–1904	58	12	33	0	102	wing, centre, scrum-half
652	Glan Jones	1946–1947	17	0	1	0	2	scrum-half
822	Ian Jones	1964	3	0	0	0	0	scrum-half
517	Jimmy Jones	1941–1943	1	0	0	0	0	
650	John Jones	1946	22	6	0	0	18	second-row. Signed from Llanelli RFC
419	Joseph Jones	1933–1934	5	0	0	0	0	
1196	Josh Jones	2012–2015	105	27	0	0	108	centre, second-row
849	Les Jones	1967–1981	485	283	0	0	0	wing, centre. Saints’ 2nd highest try scorer
435	Ossie Jones	1935–1937	61	11	24	0	81	centre. Signed from Neath RFC
981	Paul Jones	1985–1991	52	2	0	0	8	second-row
1123	Stuart Jones	2003	20	2	0	0	8	second-row, loose forward
677	Robert Jones	1948–1949	25	2	0	0	6	second-row, prop
366	Robert Jones	1928–1934	120	19	39	0	135	centre, stand-off, scrum-half
637	Trevor Jones	1945	4	0	0	0	0	centre, second-row
289	Walter Jones	1921–1922	38	3	0	0	9	second-row
1092	Tim Jonkers	1998–2004	122	17	0	0	68	second-row
510	Micky Joyce	1940–1941	2	0	0	0	0	wing
1037	Chris Joynt	1992–2004	382	121	0	0	484	loose forward. Club captain
537	William Judge	1941	1	0	0	0	0	second-row. WW2 guest from Featherstone Rovers
838	Denis Karalius	1956–1958	24	1	0	0	3	second-row. Brother of Tony & Vince
838	Tony Karalius	1967–1978	355	26	0	0	78	second-row, hooker
709	Vince Karalius	1952–1962	252	42	0	0	126	loose forward. "The Wild Bull of the Pampas"
1013	Tony Kay	1989–1990	17	0	0	0	0	centre. Re-signed for Barrow for £8000 on 10 August 1991, once his loan period was completed
1024	Brimah Kebbie	1990–1991	9	2	0	0	8	wing. Father of footballer Elliot Kebbie
1317	Billy Keeley	2026–present	5	1	0	0	4	Second-row. Début on 1 Aug 2026 v York Knights. Born 30 June 2008 (age 18)
180	Arthur Kelly	1903–1913	63	8	6	0	36	wing, centre, stand-off. New Zealander; Saints 1st overseas signing Tourist with the All Golds in 1907–08. NZRL Roll of Honour
225	Harry Kelly	1912–1917	14	4	0	0	12	wing
526	John Kelly	1941	1	0	0	0	0	left wing. WW2 guest player; borrowed from Leeds RLFC team when Saints were a man short
449	James Kelly	1936–1938	29	7	0	0	21	scrum-half
821	Kevin Kelly	1964	1	1	0	0	3	centre
861	Ken Kelly	1969–1972	87	49	1	0	149	stand-off, scrum-half
880	Paul Kelly	1971	4	1	0	0	3	stand-off. Player exchange with Leigh for David Eckersley.
619	Kenneth Kendall	1944	1	1	0	0	3	centre. WW2 guest from opponents Huddersfield when Saints were a man short
98	George Kennedy	1900–1902	38	6	0	0	18	stand-off, scrum-half
295	William Kennedy	1921	17	0	0	0	0	second-row
1143	Ian Kenny	2004	1	0	0	0	0	second-row. "Bob". Left to join Warrington Wolves
579	Jimmy Kenny	1943	1	0	0	0	0	left wing. Later played for Widnes RLFC
678	Lenny Kenny	1948	15	7	0	0	21	wing, centre. Signed from Leeds RLFC
542	Samuel Kerr	1942–1943	3	0	0	0	0	scrum-half, stand-off
51	Henry Kershaw	1897	10	2	0	0	6	left wing. Signed from Leeds RLFC
555	Ted Kerwick	1942	1	0	0	0	0	stand-off. WW2 guest player
616	James Kilgannon	1944	4	1	0	0	3	
798	Len Killeen	1962–1967	187	115	408	0	1161	wing. "Lenny the Lion"; South African signed from Uitenhage RUFC
30	John Kilshaw	1895–1896	11	0	0	0	0	second-row
448	Jack King	1944–1945	12	1	0	0	3	second-row, loose forward
612	John King	1942–1945	22	1	1	0	5	fullback
701	William King	1951	4	0	0	0	0	prop
1109	John Kirkpatrick	2001–2003	23	11	0	0	44	right wing, fullback
1304	David Klemmer	2026–present	5	1	0	0	4	prop, second-row, loose forward. Début on 6 Feb 2026 v Workington Town in the Challenge Cup
930	John Knighton	1978–1979	35	5	0	0	15	centre
565	Unknown Knowles	1942–1943	3	2	0	0	6	wing. WW2 guest
778	Mike Knowles	1960–1962	21	2	0	0	6	prop
1225	Morgan Knowles	2015–2025	172	28	0	0	112	loose forward, second-row. Début 15 May 2015 v York Knights
649	Trialist Knowles	1946	1	0	0	0	0	stand-off
1318	Oscar Knox	2026–present	1	0	0	0	0	Début on 4 Sep 2026 v Leigh Leopards. Born 30 June 2007 (age 19)
1194	Anthony Laffranchi	2012–2014	71	19	0	0	76	second-row
105	Jack Lambert	1902	19	1	1	0	5	right wing, centre. Moved to Widnes RLFC
1279	Ben Lane	2022	2	0	0	1	2	stand-off. Début on 29 Aug 2022 v Wakefield Trinity
768	Percy Landsberg	1959–1960	22	2	11	0	28	centre, fullback. Signed from South Africa for £1500
708	George Langfield	1952–1953	55	9	205	0	437	scrum-half
1157	Gary Langley	2006	1	1	3	0	10	wing. Signed from Salford Red Devils; moved on to Oldham Roughyeds
722	Pat Lannon	1954–1955	46	4	0	0	12	hooker
994	Dave Large	1986–1990	28	7	0	0	28	wing. Loaned to Rochdale Hornets
536	Ernie Large	1941–1949	3	0	0	0	0	wing
745	Ken Large	1957–1962	136	83	27	0	303	centre, wing. 1960–61 Lancashire Cup winner against Swinton
28	Daniel Latham	1895	1	0	0	0	0	prop
810	Doug Laughton	1963–1965	78	14	0	0	42	loose forward
169	Joseph Lavery	1907	1	0	0	0	0	centre
265	Billy Lavin	1918–1919	8	2	0	0	6	centre, stand-off
296	Albert Lawley	1921	5	0	2	0	4	fullback
673	John Lawrence	1948–1951	72	26	0	0	78	centre, stand-off. Known as "Mick"
506	William Lawrenson	1939–1945	8	2	0	0	6	second-row. RAF during WW2, later became a police officer in St Helens
629	Edwin Lea	1945	4	0	0	0	0	scrum-half
972	Steve Lea	1984	5	2	0	0	8	stand-off
1056	Andrew Leathem	1994–1999	45	2	0	0	8	prop. "Gripper"
953	Barry Ledger	1981–1987	214	112	79	9	601	wing. Son of Eric Ledger
719	Eric Ledger	1953–1955	35	32	0	0	96	wing. Father of Barry Ledger
924	Colin Ledsham	1977	1	1	0	0	3	centre
86	Frank Lee	1899–1911	201	15	25	0	95	prop, second-row
996	Mark Lee	1986–1988	7	0	0	1	1	hooker
1235	Tommy Lee	2017	19	0	0	0	0	hooker
1241	Matty Lees	2017–present	172	28	0	0	112	Prop, Second-row. Début 7 Sep 2017 v Wakefield Trinity
410	Arthur Lemon	1933–1934	79	9	0	0	27	loose forward
1047	Afi Leuila	1993	2	2	0	0	8	centre. Ex-Tonga RU
1020	Dave Lever	1989–1990	2	1	0	0	4	second-row
160	Ernest Lewis	1907	4	0	0	0	0	second-row, centre
648	Howard Lewis	1946–1948	32	0	0	0	0	second-row
302	George Lewis	1923–1936	428	45	850	0	1835	scrum-half, centre, fullback. Captained Saints; Brother of Stan Lewis
303	Stan Lewis	1921–1923	47	6	5	0	28	scrum-half. Brother of George Lewis
44	William Lewis	1896	2	1	0	0	3	centre. From Llanelli RFC. In his Début against Widnes, Saints played with a man short, but still won.
420	James Leyden	1933	4	0	0	0	0	second-row
1308	Bill Leyland	2026	2	2	0	0	8	Hooker. Two separate loan spells from Hull KR. Début v Wigan Warriors in Good Friday derby
332	Fred Leyland	1924	1	0	0	0	0	second-row
760	Fred Leyland	1958–1962	55	6	0	0	18	prop. Son of Jimmy
399	Jimmy Leyland	1932–1934	6	1	0	0	3	second-row. "Whisper". Brother of Tommy & father of Fred
1162	Paul Leyland	2006	1	0	0	0	0	prop. "Leylo"
528	Tommy Leyland	1941–1948	78	17	0	0	51	second-row. Brother of James
317	Joseph Lightfoot	1923–1925	6	0	0	0	0	hooker
175	Fred Lilley	1908–1909	21	1	1	0	5	second-row, prop
766	John Lindley	1959	6	0	0	0	0	centre, second-row, prop
431	James Liptrot	1934–1935	2	1	0	0	3	loose forward
893	Graham Liptrot	1973–1988	387	32	0	0	104	hooker
941	Denis Litherland	1979–1987	142	38	0	0	132	left wing, centre
626	George Litherland	1944–1946	18	1	0	0	3	second-row
19	Freddie Little	1895–1898	48	2	0	0	6	scrum-half. Originally from Belfast. Played in the 1897 Challenge Cup final
47	Richard Little	1896	3	0	0	0	0	second-row, prop
1158	Craig Littler	2006	1	1	0	0	4	centre
65	George Liversedge	1898–1905	184	46	4	0	146	wing
667	Stewart Llewellyn	1948–1958	287	239	0	0	717	wing
628	Ronald Lloyd	1944	1	0	0	0	0	prop. WW2 guest borrowed from opponents Wakefield Trinity
1178	Jonny Lomax	2009–present	358	140	119	6	821	fullback, stand-off, scrum-half. Début 27 Mar 2009 v Wakefield Trinity
94	Walter Lomax	1900	2	0	0	0	0	scrum-half
884	William Lomax	1971	1	0	0	0	0	Off the subs bench to beat Batley
1078	Sean Long	1997–2009	331	156	989	23	2625	scrum-half. "Longy"
835	Terry Loughlin	1966–1968	6	1	0	0	3	prop. "Paddy". Father of Paul & Michael. One-time publican of the Liverpool Arms, St Helens
967	Paul Loughlin	1983–1995	297	80	842	0	2004	centre. Son of Terry/Paddy
671	James Lowe	1947–1952	173	8	16	0	56	fullback. Signed after demobilisation
1268	Joey Lussick	2022–2023	52	11	8	0	60	hooker, loose forward. Australian signed from Parramatta Eels
93	Unknown Lyon	1900–1901	3	0	0	0	0	left wing
155	Peter Lyon	1906–1907	9	3	0	0	9	left wing
883	Dennis Lyon	1971–1973	5	0	1	0	2	second-row
1039	David Lyon	1992–1996	66	26	20	1	145	fullback
1148	Jamie Lyon	2005–2006	63	46	213	0	610	centre, stand-off
1302	Nene Macdonald	2026–present	5	0	0	0	0	centre. Début on 6 Feb 2026 v Workington Town in the Challenge Cup
444	Roderick MacDonald	1935–1937	6	1	0	0	3	prop
1122	Steve Maden	2002–2003	2	1	0	0	4	fullback, wing, centre. "Iron"
1182	Shaun Magennis	2010–2012	33	4	0	0	16	second-row, prop
60	Thomas Maguire	1898–1903	12	0	0	0	0	prop, second-row. Feb 1898 – Jan 1903
791	Bill Major	1962–1963	81	3	0	0	9	loose forward, second-row. Exchanged for Vince Karalius who went to Widnes. Club captain
1187	Tommy Makinson	2011–2024	348	201	273	1	1412	right wing, centre, fullback. Début 18 Feb 2011 v Salford Red Devils
554	Jack Maloney	1942	2	0	0	0	0	left wing. WW2 guest from Wigan RLFC
152	Jack Manchester	1911–1920	110	38	1	0	116	wing, centre
534	John Manley	1941	1	1	0	0	3	stand-off. WW2 guest from Halifax
1019	George Mann	1989–1993	141	23	0	0	92	prop, second-row
824	John Mantle	1964–1975	435	69	2	0	221	prop, second-row. Signed from Newport RFC. £4,636 Testimonial in 1976
1200	Willie Manu	2013-2014	47	9	0	0	36	second-row, loose forward
908	Les Mara	1975	5	3	0	0	9	stand-off. Australian from Balmain Tigers
820	David Markey	1964–1966	12	2	0	0	6	second-row. Transferred to Widnes in the same deal with Ray French.
148	John Marr	1905–1906	2	0	0	0	0	centre
240	William Marr	1914	1	0	0	0	0	fullback
1316	Cole Marsh	2026–present	2	0	0	0	0	Début 17 Jul 2026 v Catalans Dragons
863	Dennis Marsh	1969	1	0	0	0	0	prop
1264	Shay Martyn	2022	2	0	4	0	8	wing
1042	Tommy Martyn	1992–2003	211	127	105	24	742	stand-off
1214	Mose Masoe	2014–2015	62	10	0	0	40	
1128	Keith Mason	2003–2005	63	4	0	0	16	
1314	Chris Matagi	2026–present	6	0	0	0	0	Début 12 Jul 2026 v Toulouse Olympique
1260	Sione Mata'utia	2021–2024	53	11	0	0	44	Second-row, Centre, Loose forward. Début 26 Mar 2021 v Salford Red Devils
1057	Vila Matautia	1995–2001	145	24	0	0	96	
885	Roy Mathias	1972–1982	412	218	0	0	654	
1068	Paul Mathison	1995	3	0	0	0	0	prop
468	Thomas Mattinson	1937	5	0	0	0	0	loose forward, fullback
369	Henry Maudsley	1928	2	0	0	0	0	prop. "Big Bear"
84	Jimmy Mavitty	1899–1915	246	52	0	0	156	prop
112	Thomas Mawson	1902–1904	86	1	0	0	3	second-row, prop
41	Harry May	1896	2	0	0	0	0	centre
1283	Moses Mbye	2023–2025	11	2	0	0	8	hooker. Début 28 Jul 2023 v Leeds Rhinos
1038	John McAtee	1992–1993	7	0	0	0	0	scrum-half
731	Frank McCabe	1955–1956	37	10	0	0	30	hooker
288	John McCallum	1921	1	0	0	0	0	fullback. Signed from Hawick RFC
1186	Louie McCarthy-Scarsbrook	2011–2023	372	63	0	0	252	second-row, prop, loose forward. Début 12 Feb 2011 v Wigan Warriors; Signed from Harlequins RL
269	John McComb	1919	3	0	0	0	0	
1111	Dave McConnell	2001–2002	6	4	0	0	16	loose forward, stand-off, scrum-half, second-row. "Jock"
260	Francis McCormack	1918	1	0	0	0	0	right wing. Gassed in WW1
980	Kevin McCormack	1985–1990	74	34	0	0	136	wing. Went to Leigh on loan
680	Stan McCormick	1948–1953	161	99	2	0	301	wing. Signed for a World Record £4,000 from Belle Vue
641	Patrick McCormick	1946	2	0	0	0	0	loose forward
1036	Jarrod McCracken	1992	21	5	0	0	20	centre. New Zealander
621	Thomas McCue	1944	1	0	0	0	0	scrum-half. WW2 guest from Widnes RLFC
627	Edwin McCully	1944	1	0	0	0	0	left wing
1106	Mark McCully	2001	1	0	0	0	0	fullback
1104	Wayne McDonald	2001	20	5	0	0	20	prop. 6 ft 7 in (2.01 m)
1218	Shannon McDonnell	2014	29	15	0	0	60	fullback
515	Hugh McDowell	1941	19	1	0	0	3	second-row, prop. WW2 guest from Widnes
376	Bill McGarrigan	1928	2	0	0	0	0	second-row
1159	Dean McGilvray	2006–2008	6	1	0	0	4	left wing
763	Brian McGinn	1958–1962	118	34	16	0	134	centre
748	Jack McGuiness	1957–1958	10	1	0	0	3	second-row, hooker. Transferred to Salford
964	Colin McIntyre	1983–1985	17	4	0	0	16	wing
721	Len McIntyre	1953–1956	28	8	12	0	48	hooker
10	John McKay	1895–1898	9	0	0	0	0	
737	Tom McKinney	1956–1959	93	11	5	0	43	
55	Daniel McLaughlin	1897	1	0	0	0	0	
324	Jack McLean	1923	1	0	0	0	0	
7	Joe McLees	1895	15	0	0	0	0	
236	Edward McLoughlin	1913–1921	110	32	52	0	200	
469	Peter McLoughlin	1937–1938	12	0	0	0	0	
844	Mike McNeil	1967	8	3	0	0	9	
198	David McPhail	1910	10	1	0	0	3	
1072	Derek McVey	1996–1997	47	7	1	0	30	
940	Kevin Meadows	1979–1985	107	36	0	0	122	
754	Jim Measures	1958–1961	41	8	0	0	24	
1152	Francis Meli	2006–2013	224	145	0	0	580	
36	Unknown Melling	1895	5	0	0	0	0	
311	Thomas Melling	1922–1923	36	2	0	0	6	
85	Patrick Melvin	1899–1901	33	1	0	0	3	
971	Mal Meninga	1984	31	28	8	0	128	
413	Albert Mercer	1933	1	0	0	0	0	
338	Billy Mercer	1925–1937	311	75	0	0	225	
77	William Mercer	1898–1907	46	1	2	0	7	
713	Peter Metcalfe	1952–1955	71	29	234	0	555	
196	Norman Micklethwaite	1909	8	0	0	0	0	
275	Tommy Middlehurst	1920–1922	6	1	0	0	3	
333	Thomas Miller	1924	4	0	0	0	0	
575	Ernie Mills	1943–1946	76	12	18	0	72	
597	Pseudonym Minty	1944	1	0	0	0	0	
274	Joseph Molyneux	1920–1922	34	18	0	0	54	
257	Peter Molyneux	1918–1921; 1925	85	8	0	0	24	
213	Richard Molyneux	1911–1921	99	8	37	0	98	
562	Bob Montford	1942–1943	19	0	0	0	0	
68	Frank Mooney	1898–1908	182	4	0	0	12	
805	Mick Mooney	1962–1963	15	2	0	0	6	
951	Gary Moorby	1981–1983	63	23	0	0	70	
700	Owen Moore	1951–1952	36	2	0	0	6	
1145	Scott Moore	2004–2011	73	10	0	0	40	
1233	Ryan Morgan	2017–2019	49	24	0	0	96	
439	William Morgan	1935–1936	14	0	0	0	0	
1048	Chris Morley	1994–1997	78	8	0	0	32	
577	Unknown Morris	1943–1944	1	0	0	0	0	
95	John Morris	1900–1904	24	2	0	0	6	
882	Ged Morris	1971	1	0	0	0	0	
645	Steve Morris	1946–1948	26	3	0	0	9	
61	John Morrison	1897–1901	7	2	0	0	6	
329	Patrick Morton	1924	1	0	0	0	0	right wing
712	Glyn Moses	1952–1959	259	44	0	0	132	fullback
1273	Daniel Moss	2022-2023	2	0	0	0	0	fullback. Début on 22 Apr 2022 v Castleford Tigers
690	Kenneth Moss	1949–1950	14	2	0	0	6	prop
206	John Moulsdale	1910	6	0	0	0	0	fullback
602	Peter Moville	1943–1944	2	0	0	0	0	scrum-half
101	David Mullineux	1901	2	0	0	0	0	second-row
735	Alex Murphy	1956–1966	320	175	42	0	609	scrum-half, centre
1292	Lewis Murphy	2025–present	10	6	0	0	24	wing. Début on 8 Feb 2025 v West Hull in the Challenge Cup
886	Mick Murphy	1972–1975	98	4	0	0	12	prop
644	Paddy Murtagh	1946	7	1	0	0	3	loose forward
817	Jim Mustard	1963–1964	12	1	0	0	3	second-row
234	Billy Myers	1913–1915	59	12	0	0	36	second-row, loose forward. Played at #13 in the 1915 Challenge Cup final defeat to Huddersfield RLFC
474	Jim Myers	1937–1947	51	13	0	0	39	stand-off, centre
843	Frank Myler	1967–1971	144	46	2	0	142	stand-off
1247	Kevin Naiqama	2019–2021	77	39	0	0	156	centre. Début 31 Jan 2019 v Wigan Warriors; Captain of Fiji.
767	Thomas Naylor	1959	1	0	0	0	0	fullback
1001	Jon Neill	1987–1996	105	3	0	1	13	prop
1071	Chris Newall	1995	1	0	0	0	0	second-row. Joined Rochdale Hornets
1064	Paul Newlove	1995–2003	208	134	0	1	536	centre
891	George Nicholls	1973–1981	272	41	0	1	123	second-row
540	Albert Nicholson	1942–1944	3	0	0	0	3	centre
545	Harry Nicholson	1942–1944	3	0	0	0	3	wing, stand-off
1030	Sonny Nickle	1991–1995; 1999–2002	232	49	0	0	196	second-row, prop
1254	Tom Nisbet	2020–2022	1	0	0	0	0	fullback, wing. Début 26 Oct 2020 v Salford Red Devils
620	Frank Nolan	1944	1	0	0	0	0	prop. Joined Leigh
916	Mike Nolan	1976–1978	5	1	0	0	3	centre, fullback, stand-off
519	Dick Noonan	1941–1943	36	3	0	0	9	hooker. He also guested for Wigan during WW2
911	Derek Noonan	1975–1979	133	36	0	0	108	centre
1262	Dan Norman	2021–2023	1	0	0	0	0	prop. Signed from London Broncos. Début off the bench in 2021 Challenge Cup semi-final v Hull FC; Joined Leigh Leopards in 2024
657	Walter Norris	1946–1950	96	2	0	0	6	prop. Guested for both Wigan and Northampton RFC during WW2
1055	Andy Northey	1994–1997	74	21	0	0	84	
785	Keith Northey	1961–1965	119	48	48	0	240	centre. Signed from Birkenhead Park FC. Father of Andy Northey
945	Dennis Nulty	1979–1980	11	0	0	0	0	hooker
1027	Darren O'Brien	1990–1991	5	2	0	0	8	fullback
1210	Gareth O'Brien	2013	7	0	25	0	50	stand-off. On loan from Warrington Wolves
1008	Michael O'Connor	1988–1989	18	7	7	0	42	centre. "Snoz"
1035	Gus O'Donnell	1992–1993	49	2	0	28	28	scrum-half, hooker. "Ducky". Went on loan to Workington Town
45	Richard O'Hara	1896–1897	42	7	1	0	23	scrum-half, stand-off
1062	Kevin O'Loughlin	1995–1997	7	0	0	0	0	Went on loan to Halifax
734	Wilf O'Mara	1955	2	0	0	0	0	hooker. "Expensive"
1073	Julian O'Neill	1997–2000	126	5	0	0	20	
64	John Orford	1897–1898	2	0	0	0	0	stand-off. Joined when St Helens Recs folded.
947	Roger Owen	1980–1982	45	4	0	0	12	prop
816	Stan Owen	1964	12	1	0	0	3	prop
1227	Jack Owens	2016–2017	33	8	14	0	60	fullback, wing
356	George Owens	1927	7	2	0	0	6	scrum-half, stand-off. "Dodger"
1261	Agnatius Paasi	2021–present	65	3	0	0	12	Prop, Second-row, Loose forward. Début 26 Mar 2021 v Salford Red Devils
392	Philip Park	1931	4	0	0	0	0	
293	Tom Parker	1921–1922	12	2	0	0	6	centre, stand-off
923	Brian Parkes	1976–1984	142	28	1	0	94	fullback, centre, wing
530	Unknown Parkinson	1942	2	0	0	0	0	stand-off. WW2 guest
299	Norman Parkinson	1921–1922	13	3	0	0	9	prop. Brother of Phillip
291	Phillip Parkinson	1921–1922	33	1	1	0	5	fullback. Brother of Norman
432	Tommy Parkinson	1935–1937	43	0	3	0	6	fullback
335	William Parkinson	1924–1926	12	0	0	0	0	hooker, second-row
675	George Parr	1948–1954	128	9	0	0	27	prop. Signed for Barrow in April 1955
140	Joseph Parr	1904–1907	9	0	0	0	0	prop
226	Robert Parr	1912	19	0	0	0	0	prop. Signed from Barrow in exchange for William Butterfield
668	George Parsons	1947–1956	296	45	40	0	215	
1248	Joseph Paulo	2019–2020	36	1	0	0	4	Second-row
91	Alfred Peacock	1900	19	0	0	0	0	wing
92	Charles Pearson	1900–1901	8	0	0	0	0	wing, centre
1275	Taylor Pemberton	2022-2023	2	0	0	0	0	hooker. Début on 22 Apr 2022 v Castleford Tigers
92	Jimmy Pendlebury	1938–1939	16	0	0	0	0	fullback, centre
567	Arthur Pendleton	1942	6	0	1	0	2	scrum-half
81	Cuthbert Pennington	1899–1903	63	6	41	0	100	second-row, centre. "Cuddy"
325	William Pennington	1923	1	0	0	0	0	left wing. Detective Police Constable
170	Charlie Penrose	1907–1912	2	0	0	0	0	left wing
1203	Mark Percival	2013–present	252	124	379	0	1340	centre. Début 1 Mar 2013 v Leeds Rhinos "Percy"
1054	Apollo Perelini	1994–2000	193	44	0	0	176	prop. "The Terminator"
297	Edward Perkins	1921	5	0	0	0	0	centre
1188	Josh Perry	2011–2013	44	2	0	0	4	prop
242	Jimmy Peters	1914	2	0	0	0	0	The first black player for England RU, and later for St Helens
933	Steve Peters	1978–1985	186	43	0	0	140	centre, stand-off, scrum-half. Runners-up medal in 1983 Lancashire Cup final
1228	Dominique Peyroux	2016–2020	120	19	0	0	76	second-row, centre. Joined from New Zealand Warriors
119	William Phelps	1902	1	0	0	0	0	centre
456	Charles Phillips	1936	1	0	0	0	0	prop
631	Frank Phillips	1945	1	0	0	0	0	fullback
164	James Phillips	1907	2	0	0	0	0	fullback
556	John Phillips	1942–1945	86	1	0	0	3	hooker
738	Syd Phillips	1956	4	0	0	0	0	second-row
292	George Phoenix	1921	4	0	0	0	0	prop
918	Keiron Pickavance	1976–1980	33	2	0	0	6	second-row
1043	Ian Pickavance	1993–1998	156	24	0	1	97	second-row, prop
375	John Pickering	1928	1	0	0	0	0	right wing
508	William Pierce	1940–1945	9	3	1	0	11	stand-off, scrum-half
642	Jonty Pilkington	1945–1948	54	2	0	0	6	prop
732	Arthur Pimblett	1955–1957	19	2	42	0	90	fullback
870	Geoff Pimblett	1970–1978	365	48	608	28	1388	fullback. Club captain
488	Harry Pimblett	1938–1946	103	22	3	0	72	fullback. Related to Albert, Arthur, Geoff & Tom Pimblett
789	Jack Pimblett	1961–1965	4	2	0	0	6	left wing, second-row. Son of Harry Pimblett
371	Peter Pimblett	1928	1	0	0	0	0	right wing
819	Tom Pimblett	1963–1966	26	8	0	0	24	wing. Joined Rochdale Hornets
912	Harry Pinner	1974–1986	332	78	140	73	604	loose forward. Club captain. Nephew of William Fishwick. St. Helens record converter of Drop Goals
315	Charlie Pitman	1923	19	5	0	0	15	wing
956	Andy Platt	1983–1988	185	68	1	1	269	prop
909	Billy Platt	1975–1977	18	2	0	0	6	centre, second-row
97	Sam Plunkett	1900	1	0	0	0	0	second-row
144	Jack Pope	1905–1918	171	17	0	0	51	hooker
102	George Porter	1901–1902	11	1	0	0	3	fullback
304	Thomas Porter	1921–1922	5	2	0	0	6	loose forward. Wounded by shrapnel on 29 November 1917 at Cambrai
498	James Potter	1938	1	0	0	0	0	fullback
438	Stanley Powell	1935–1945	194	45	320	0	775	fullback, wing, centre, stand-off, scrum-half
679	Alan Prescott	1948–1959	404	31	0	0	93	wing, loose forward, second-row. Club captain
601	Edwin Prescott	1943–1945	8	1	0	0	3	stand-off
856	Eric Prescott	1968–1972	85	20	3	0	66	second-row
139	James Prescott	1899–1919	254	66	2	0	202	second-row. "Butcher". Brother of William
126	Joseph Prescott	1903–1904	4	0	0	0	0	second-row
1044	Steve Prescott MBE	1993–1997	117	52	66	0	340	fullback. Son of Eric Prescott
79	William Prescott	1899–1905	150	8	0	0	24	
462	Ron Preston	1936–1945	10	0	0	0	0	centre, wing, loose forward
1094	Gareth Price	1999	11	2	0	0	8	second-row. Joined Leigh Centurions
995	Phil Price	1986–1987	2	1	0	0	4	centre
746	Raymond Price	1957	20	5	14	0	43	stand-off
646	William Price	1946	1	0	0	0	0	hooker
757	Jan Prinsloo	1958–1961	89	70	0	0	210	wing
769	Roy Pritchard	1959–1960	9	0	16	0	32	fullback. Sold to Rochdale Hornets for £3,000
309	Jack Prosser	1922	7	1	0	0	3	second-row. Ex-Welsh RU player signed from Leigh
826	Bob Prosser	1965–1966	45	2	0	0	6	stand-off, scrum-half
1153	Leon Pryce	2006–2011	160	73	0	0	292	stand-off, wing
465	Glan Pryor	1936–1937	9	2	0	0	6	second-row. Ex-Welsh RU player signed from Llanelli RFC
1175	Tony Puletua	2009–2013	137	40	0	0	160	prop. "TP"
185	Charles Purslow	1908	2	0	0	0	0	second-row. Signed from Warrington RLFC
1226	Adam Quinlan	2015	12	6	0	0	24	fullback. Scored a hat-trick on début against Huddersfield Giants
1000	Les Quirk	1987–1993	160	98	0	0	392	wing
654	William Rankin	1946–1947	5	0	0	0	0	
128	Ernest Ratcliffe	1903–1904	3	0	0	0	0	
718	Gordon Ratcliffe	1953–1954	22	12	0	0	36	
703	Lewis Reece	1951	1	0	0	0	0	
847	Graham Rees	1967–1972	181	33	0	0	99	
76	Jack Rennie	1898–1902	76	2	0	0	6	
546	Charles Reynolds	1942–1943	4	0	1	0	2	
15	Tom Reynolds	1895–1898	68	1	0	0	3	
727	Austin Rhodes	1955–1962; 1968–1969	265	97	815	0	1921	
1211	Greg Richards	2013–2017	73	1	0	0	4	
1234	Danny Richardson	2017–2019	59	10	175	9	399	scrum-half
220	Joseph Richardson	1912–1913	58	9	2	0	31	
1163	Neil Rigby	2006	1	0	0	0	0	
576	Frank Riley	1943–1946	72	10	3	0	36	
411	Joseph Riley	1933–1935	17	0	0	0	6	
1031	Mike Riley	1991–1995	73	11	0	0	44	
643	Albert Rimmer	1946	1	0	0	0	0	
14	Sam Rimmer	1895–1903	45	1	0	0	3	
1282	Tee Ritson	2024–2025	25	3	0	0	12	
1256	Nico Rizzelli	2020–2021	1	0	0	0	0	Centre, Wing. Début 26 Oct 2020 v Salford Red Devils
1016	Jason Roach	1989–1995	6	0	0	0	0	
696	Wilf Roach	1950–1953	37	13	0	0	39	
663	Bob Roberts	1947–1948	26	1	0	0	3	
454	George Roberts	1936–1942	74	1	0	0	3	
231	Herbert Roberts	1913–1921	106	24	2	0	76	
845	Garth Robertson	1967	11	3	2	0	13	
1290	Harry Robertson	2024–present	27	14	0	0	56	wing, centre. Début v Wigan Warriors on 12 Jul 2024
267	Alf Robinson	1918–1923	75	9	0	0	27	
483	Herbert Robinson	1938–1941	22	4	2	0	16	
611	Jimmy Robinson	1944	1	0	0	0	0	
367	Joseph Robinson	1928	4	3	0	0	9	
828	Joe Robinson	1965–1968	29	2	0	0	6	
730	Roy Robinson	1955–1958	57	15	0	0	45	
704	Thomas Robinson	1951	2	0	0	0	0	
1136	James Roby	2004–2023	551	107	1	1	471	Hooker. Début 19 Mar 2004 v Widnes Vikings
1141	Mike Roby	2004	1	0	0	0	0	
341	Frederick Roffey	1925–1926	63	19	0	0	57	
1021	Tea Ropati	1989–1994	129	56	24	2	274	
759	James Rose	1958–1959	5	0	0	0	0	
784	Toni Rossi	1961	2	0	0	0	0	
127	Dicky Rothwell	1903–1907	36	7	2	0	25	
237	Henry Roughsedge	1913–1918	11	2	0	0	6	
443	Henry Roughsedge	1935–1946	23	2	0	0	6	
959	Paul Round	1982–1986	121	42	0	0	168	
1126	Steve Rowlands	2003	2	0	0	0	0	
952	Allan Rowley	1981	4	0	0	0	0	
854	Brian Rowley	1968–1973	5	1	0	0	3	
1265	Sam Royle	2021–2024	28	2	0	0	8	Second-row. Début 17 Sep 2021 v Salford Red Devils
961	Stephen Rule	1983–1984	40	4	49	0	118	
480	Michael Rush	1937–1938	5	0	0	0	0	
57	George Rutter	1897	6	1	0	0	3	
187	Arthur Ryan	1906–1908	2	0	0	0	0	
583	Martin Ryan	1943	5	0	0	0	0	
1293	Tristan Sailor	2025–present	32	18	0	0	72	halfback, fullback. Début on 8 Feb 2025 v West Hull in the Challenge Cup
1297	Dayon Sambou	2025	6	1	0	0	4	wing. Début on 21 Mar 2025 v Warrington Wolves
1271	Jumah Sambou	2022-2023	1	1	0	0	4	centre, wing. Début on 22 Apr 2022 v Castleford Tigers
217	Arthur Saunders	1911–1912	13	1	0	0	3	second-row, centre. Signed from Wigan
116	George Savage	1911–1912	1	0	0	0	0	loose forward
1216	Andre Savelio	2014–2016	42	3	0	0	12	second-row, loose forward, prop
832	Bill Sayer	1965–1970	147	26	0	0	78	hooker
214	George Scholes	1911	19	2	2	0	10	stand-off. Played against the Australian touring side in 1911
927	Duncan Scott	1977–1979	18	2	25	0	0	wing. Joined Leigh RLFC
134	Joseph Scott	1904	2	0	0	0	0	second-row, prop
1083	Paul Sculthorpe	1998–2008	261	113	392	10	1246	loose forward
965	Derrick Seabrook	1983–1985	17	4	2	0	20	scrum-half
935	Chris Seldon	1978–1979	26	1	0	0	3	second-row
729	Reg Senior	1955–1956	30	11	0	0	33	centre. Joined Liverpool City
218	James Shallcross	1911–1914	84	6	13	0	44	prop. Signed from Wigan
516	Thomas Shannon	1941	3	1	0	0	3	scrum-half, stand-off
580	Duggie Shaw	1943–1944	32	4	3	0	18	second-row
307	Ernest Shaw	1922–1929	259	57	47	0	265	second-row, fullback, centre, prop, loose forward
865	Bill Sheffield	1969–1970	10	2	0	0	6	second-row. Joined Rochdale Hornets
1063	Richard Sheil	1995–1997	4	0	0	0	0	second-row
1185	Michael Shenton	2011–2012	58	20	0	0	80	
551	Eric Sherratt	1942	2	0	0	0	0	
132	Herbert Sherwood	1904	14	0	0	0	0	
1103	Peter Shiels	2001–2002	57	11	0	0	44	
736	Bill Shiels	1955–1957	6	0	0	0	0	
1305	Joe Shorrocks	2026–present	5	1	0	0	4	loose forward, second-row. Début on 6 Feb 2026 v Workington Town in the Challenge Cup
62	Albert Siddall	1897–1898	19	3	0	0	9	
725	Nat Silcock Jr.	1954–1958	138	29	0	0	87	
73	John Simcock	1898	1	0	0	0	0	
320	Albert Simm	1923–1927	86	2	0	0	6	
1250	Josh Simm	2019–2022	19	7	0	0	28	Centre, Second-row. Grandson of Geoff Pimblett. Moved to Wynnum Manly Seagulls in Brisbane in 2022, then returned to UK to join Castleford Tigers for 2024
1121	Jon Simms	2002	1	0	0	0	0	
52	Jack Simpson	1897–1898	45	0	0	0	0	
1295	Alfie Sinclair	2021–present	1	0	0	0	0	prop. Début on 8 Feb 2025 v West Hull in the Challenge Cup
1269	Curtis Sironen	2022–present	64	10	0	0	40	loose forward, second-row. Début on 10 Feb 2022 v Catalans Dragons
272	James Skeath	1919–1921	7	0	0	0	0	
373	Henry Slater	1928	1	0	0	0	0	
921	Paul Slattery	1976	12	6	0	0	18	
1243	Aaron Smith	2018–2022	35	9	0	0	36	Hooker. Début 8 Sep 2018 v Catalans Dragons
484	Alec Smith	1938	1	0	0	0	0	
1081	Chris Smith	1998–2000	79	28	0	0	112	
1086	Damien Smith	1998	22	8	0	0	32	
1124	Darren Smith	2003	31	19	0	0	76	
351	Harold Smith	1927–1929	91	0	0	0	0	
120	Jack Smith	1902–1908	95	3	19	0	47	
472	Jim Smith	1937–1939	50	6	0	0	18	
917	Johnny Smith	1976–1984	81	8	0	0	27	
929	Malcolm Smith	1978–1979	14	2	0	0	6	
1155	Matty Smith	2006–2010; 2017–2018	49	5	10	4	44	
412	Peter Smith	1933–1939	86	26	3	0	84	
733	Wilf Smith	1955–1968	200	55	1	0	167	
482	William Smith	1937	1	0	0	0	0	
1180	Sia Soliola	2010–2014	117	31	0	0	124	
1118	Paul Southern	2002	2	0	0	0	0	
991	Phil Southward	1986–1987	4	0	0	0	0	
983	Peter Souto	1985–1987	6	1	0	0	4	
1231	Jake Spedding	2016-2018	4	0	0	0	0	centre, wing
1206	Dom Speakman	2013	1	0	0	0	0	stand-off, hooker, scrum-half
70	James Speed	1898	1	0	0	0	0	
446	William Stafford	1936	1	0	0	0	0	
1098	John Stankevitch	2000–2004	131	26	0	0	104	
318	William Stanton	1923	1	0	0	0	0	
868	John Stephens	1970–1974	127	16	0	0	48	
429	Monty Stephens	1934–1936	56	20	0	0	60	
1287	Noah Stephens	2024–present	24	1	0	0	4	Prop
1079	Anthony Stewart	1996–2004	140	56	0	0	224	
846	Don Stillwell	1967–1971	11	0	0	0	0	
243	Oliver Stirrup	1914–1915	14	3	1	0	11	
501	Jim Stott	1939–1952	193	65	295	0	785	
72	Thomas Stott	1898	13	2	0	0	0	
548	Tommy Stott	1942–1951	79	14	89	0	220	
330	Eric Stout	1924	16	0	0	0	0	
664	Harry Street	1947–1948	32	3	0	0	9	
71	George Stubbings	1898	8	0	0	0	0	
49	John Sudlow	1896–1897	27	3	0	0	9	
18	Tom Sudlow	1895–1896	26	4	1	1	18	
1029	Anthony Sullivan	1991–2001	305	213	5	0	862	
780	Mick Sullivan	1960–1962	82	31	0	0	93	
1310	Daniel Suluka-Fifita	2026–present	12	0	0	0	0	Prop. Début 11 Jun 2026 v Warrington Wolves
585	Raymond Sutcliffe	1943	5	0	0	0	0	
25	Adam Sutton	1895–1899	22	1	0	0	3	
1197	Adam Swift	2012-2019	130	86	0	0	344	wing
459	John Swift	1936	2	0	0	0	0	
358	Laurence Swire	1927	1	0	0	0	0	
1238	Zeb Taia	2017–2020	107	23	0	0	92	Second-row, Lock. Début 3 Mar 2017 v Wakefield Trinity
1132	Willie Talau	2003–2008	152	66	0	0	264	
998	Dave Tanner	1987–1991	95	15	93	0	246	
1229	Lama Tasi	2016	19	0	0	0	0	
485	Abel Tatum	1938	27	0	0	0	0	
872	Dave Taylor	1970–1971	5	0	0	0	0	
878	Frank Taylor	1971–1976	35	8	0	0	24	
538	George Taylor	1941	1	0	0	0	0	
949	Kevin Taylor	1980–1981	7	0	0	0	0	
54	Richard Taylor	1897–1898	34	4	0	0	12	
532	Friend Taylor	1941	1	0	0	0	0	
233	Bill Tellyn	1913	36	5	0	0	15	
790	John Tembey	1962–1965	137	20	0	0	60	
525	Nelson Tennant	1941	1	0	0	0	0	
728	Abe Terry	1954–1961	216	27	0	0	81	
762	Fred Terry	1958–1960	30	3	0	0	9	
168	James Thompson	1907	3	0	0	0	0	
48	Joe Thompson	1895–1905	262	9	0	0	27	
1259	Joel Thompson	2021	19	1	0	0	4	Prop
892	Ken Thompson	1972–1976	12	2	0	0	6	
1209	Luke Thompson	2013–2020	164	29	0	0	116	
479	Norman Thompson	1938–1946	96	4	0	0	12	
578	Robert Thompson	1943	5	0	2	0	4	
1172	Sam Thompson	2008	6	0	0	0	0	
1191	Warren Thompson	2008–2011	1	1	0	0	4	
622	Jim Thornburrow	1944	1	0	0	0	0	
710	Stan Thornett	1952–1953	8	1	0	0	3	
383	Robert Thorpe	1929–1930	7	0	0	0	0	
244	Jack Tickle	1914–1915	1	0	0	0	0	
1208	James Tilley	2013–2014	3	0	0	0	0	
815	Bryan Todd	1964	17	5	7	0	29	
56	William Todd	1897	1	0	0	0	0	
154	William Tomkinson	1906	2	0	0	0	0	
251	Henry Tomlinson	1915–1918	1	0	0	0	0	
141	Teddy Toole	1904–1911	97	9	40	0	107	
547	Peter Topping	1942	6	1	8	0	19	
496	Frank Tracey	1939–1947	80	30	0	0	90	
276	William Travena	1920–1921	9	0	2	0	4	
42	David Traynor	1896–1900	160	61	89	0	364	
159	Fred Trenwith	1907–1920	172	39	3	0	123	
1099	Darrell Trindall	2000	2	0	0	0	0	
640	Ron Tucker	1945–1946	12	3	0	0	9	
1088	Fereti Tuilagi	1999–2000	62	21	0	0	84	
357	Harry Turner	1927–1930	29	5	0	0	15	
263	James Turner	1918	1	0	0	0	0	
1199	Jordan Turner	2012–2016	117	45	13	3	209	
864	Ray Turner	1969–1971	8	0	0	0	0	
190	Hubert Turtill	1909–1913	140	3	200	0	409	
395	George Twist	1931–1932	6	1	0	0	3	
566	Joe Twist	1942	2	0	0	0	0	
470	Peter Twist	1937–1943	152	55	0	0	165	
1156	Steve Tyrer	2006–2010	22	12	54	0	156	
88	Isaac Unsworth	1900	18	0	0	0	0	
382	Bert Unwin	1929–1931	37	1	0	0	3	
202	Rupert Upton	1910	1	1	0	0	3	
858	Errol Van Niekirk	1968	2	2	0	0	6	
747	Tom van Vollenhoven	1957–1967	409	392	0	0	1176	
1289	Jonny Vaughan	2024–2025	1	0	0	0	0	Centre
1007	Paul Vautin	1988	21	4	0	0	16	
1220	Atelea Vea	2015–2016	40	10	0	0	40	
970	Phil Veivers	1984–1996	381	98	0	5	397	
1146	Gray Viane	2004	4	1	0	0	4	
777	Don Vines	1960	38	1	0	0	3	
596	Pseudonym Vyles	1944	1	0	0	0	0	
199	Archie Waddell	1910–1913	97	18	0	0	54	
442	Arthur Waddington	1935	6	2	0	0	6	
1237	Adam Walker	2017	9	1	0	0	4	
1202	Anthony Walker	2013–2014	17	2	0	0	8	
513	Frank Walker	1941	2	0	0	0	0	
808	George Walker	1963	1	0	0	0	0	
1069	Martin Walker	1995	1	0	0	0	0	
191	Robert Walker	1909–1910	11	0	0	0	0	
414	Thomas Wallace	1933	1	0	0	0	0	
887	Tony Waller	1972–1973	26	1	0	0	3	
1201	Alex Walmsley	2013–present	270	49	0	0	196	Prop. Début 15 Feb 2013 v Hull FC
146	Dick Walmsley	1905	1	1	1	0	5	
852	John Walsh	1967–1974	185	48	156	0	456	
1212	Luke Walsh	2014–2016	64	15	198	10	466	
418	Victor Walsh	1933–1935	4	0	0	0	0	
672	Trialist Walton	1947	1	0	0	0	0	
849	Bobby Wanbon	1968–1971	79	18	0	0	54	
201	George Warburton	1910	12	4	0	0	12	
1116	Barry Ward	2002–2003	59	5	3	0	26	prop. Australian
811	Frank Ward	1963–1965	8	0	0	0	0	
586	Jack Ward	1943	5	0	0	0	0	
1025	Kevin Ward	1990–1992	89	8	0	0	32	prop
497	Jack Waring	1938–1945	68	34	0	0	102	
586	Gerald Waring	1941	8	2	0	0	6	
1053	Phil Waring	1994–1995	16	5	0	0	20	
600	Tom Waring	1945	34	5	0	0	15	
812	John Warlow	1963–1969; 1973–1975	245	27	0	0	81	
135	Thomas Warner	1904	18	0	0	0	0	
774	Cliff Watson	1960–1970	373	57	0	0	171	
224	Jim Webb	1912–1913	5	0	0	0	0	
559	Ronnie Webb	1942	1	1	0	0	3	
1161	Ian Webster	2006	1	0	0	0	0	
960	Kevin Wellens	1982–1985	26	2	0	0	6	
1087	Paul Wellens	1998–2015	499	231	40	1	1005	
1232	Calvin Wellington	2016–2017	1	0	0	0	0	
889	Chris Wellman	1972	13	1	0	0	3	
1245	Jack Welsby	2018–present	117	54	0	3	219	Fullback, Stand-off. Début 14 Sep 2018 v Hull FC
346	Jim Welsby	1925–1926	3	0	0	0	0	
1101	Dwayne West	2000–2002	28	6	0	0	24	
229	Trevor West	1913	10	3	0	0	9	
229	William Wharton	1900–1908	84	6	0	0	18	
1171	Gary Wheeler	2008–2014	64	22	14	0	116	
1291	George Whitby	2024–present	12	5	30	0	80	stand-off, scrum-half.
851	Josh White	1967	2	0	0	0	0	
228	Tom White	1912–1919	48	10	0	0	30	
5	Bill Whiteley	1895–1907	320	23	0	0	69	
1286	Matt Whitley	2024–present	12	3	0	0	12	Centre, Second-row
683	Bill Whittaker	1948–1952	143	10	0	0	30	
837	Alan Whittle	1966–1972	201	69	0	0	207	
948	Colin Whittle	1980–1982	17	0	0	0	0	
1119	Dave Whittle	2002	3	0	0	0	0	
221	Bill Wilcock	1912	26	1	2	0	7	
1127	Jon Wilkin	2003–2018	424	94	0	2	378	
804	Cennyd Williams	1962–1968	112	34	0	0	102	
390	Harold Williams	1930–1932	12	1	0	0	3	
857	Jon Wills	1968–1973	134	34	0	0	102	
471	Trialist Wills	1937	1	0	0	0	0	
108	Unknown Wilson	1901	1	0	0	0	0	
915	Chris Wilson	1976	1	0	0	0	0	
853	Frank Wilson	1968–1975	310	175	0	0	525	
651	Joe Wilson	1946–1950	4	0	0	0	0	
934	John Wilson	1978	1	0	0	0	0	
787	Terry Wilson	1961	1	0	0	0	0	
17	William Wilson	1895	1	0	0	0	0	
1258	Jake Wingfield	2020–present	38	1	0	0	4	Loose forward, Second-row. Début 26 Oct 2020 v Salford Red Devils
385	Tom Winnard	1929–1933	102	55	115	0	395	
716	Alan Winstanley	1952–1956	2	0	0	0	0	
16	Tom Winstanley	1895–1900	127	4	0	0	12	
23	William Winstanley	1895–1897	65	2	0	0	6	
151	John Winter	1906–1907	9	2	0	0	6	
823	Dave Wood	1964–1965	17	8	0	0	24	
323	Thomas Woods	1923	1	0	0	0	0	
222	William Woods	1912	4	1	1	0	5	
328	John Woodward	1924–1927	34	1	0	0	3	
850	Eric Woodyer	1967–1972	34	5	0	0	15	
437	James Worsley	1935–1936	30	1	0	0	3	
364	Frank Wright	1928	12	3	0	0	9	
1300	Shane Wright	2025–present	3	1	0	0	4	Second-row Initially signed on loan from Salford Red Devils, then signed a 2-year deal
353	Thomas Wright	1927–1929	5	1	0	0	3	
322	Walter Wright	1923–1926	102	32	0	0	96	
403	Charles Wyatt	1932	9	1	0	0	3	
216	James Wyatt	1911	18	5	0	0	15	
564	Austin Yates	1942–1944	7	2	0	0	6	
670	Tommy Yorke	1947–1950	6	0	0	0	0	
