= 2022 St Helens R.F.C. season =

- Super League XXVII Rank: 1st
- Play-off result: Grand Final
- Challenge Cup: Semi-final
- 2022 record: Wins: 23; draws: 0; losses: 7
- Points scored: For: 674; against: 374

Team information
- Chairman: Eamonn McManus
- Head coach: Kristian Woolf
- Captain: James Roby
- Stadium: Langtree Park
- Avg. attendance: 11,861
- High attendance: 17,980

Top scorers
- Tries: Tommy Makinson (22)
- Goals: Tommy Makinson (87)
- Points: Tommy Makinson (262)
← 2021	List of seasons	2023 →

This article details St Helens rugby league football club's 2022 season. This is the Saints' 26th consecutive season in the Super League.

== Season review ==
On 10 February, St Helens began their Super League campaign against Catalans Dragons. In a rematch of the 2021 Grand Final they repeated their success, this time with a 28–8 win. This was followed with a 38–6 win Hull F.C. that saw St Helens move to top of the table on points difference. Their good form continued as they won their opening five games before suffering an unexpected 22–20 away loss to Toulouse Olympique. In April, St Helens faced Catalans Dragons in the quarter-finals of the Challenge Cup and progressed with a 36–20 win. They then reinforced their position at the top of the league with wins over Wigan Warriors and Huddersfield Giants. In the semi-finals of the Challenge Cup, St Helens lost to Wigan. Meanwhile, they continued to perform well in the league and a 13–12 win over Wakefield Trinity in July moved them six points clear at the top of the table.

At the end of August, St Helens suffered their only home loss of the season, 34–18 to Wakefield, but despite this were confirmed as league leaders' as Wigan also lost. The final round of the regular season was a top against bottom clash in which St Helens won 36–16 over an already relegated Toulouse. As league leaders', St Helens began their play-off campaign at the semi-finals stage with a 19–12 home win over Salford Red Devils. At the 2022 Super League Awards on 20 September, Jack Welsby was named the Young Player of the Year. On 24 September, St Helens won 24–12 against Leeds Rhinos to become the first club to win four consecutive Super League Grand Finals. Jonny Lomax was named as the man of the match.

== Results ==
=== Pre-season friendlies ===
W Win L Loss

Pre-season results
Date	Versus	H/A	Venue	Result	Score	Tries	Goals	Attendance	Report
21 January	Leigh Centurions	H	Totally Wicked Stadium	W	16–6	Bell, Makinson, Simm	Dodd, Walmsley		(Note: Alex Walmsley Testimonial)

=== Super League ===
==== Table ====
Pos	Team	Pld	W	D	L	PF	PA	PD	Pts	Qualification
1	St Helens (C, L)	27	21	0	6	674	374	+300	42	Advance to semi-finals
2	Wigan Warriors	27	19	0	8	818	483	+335	38	Advance to semi-finals
3	Huddersfield Giants	27	17	1	9	613	497	+116	35	Advance to elimination finals
4	Catalans Dragons	27	16	0	11	539	513	+26	32	Advance to elimination finals
5	Leeds Rhinos	27	14	1	12	577	528	+49	29	Advance to elimination finals
6	Salford Red Devils	27	14	0	13	700	602	+98	28	Advance to elimination finals
7	Castleford Tigers	27	13	0	14	544	620	−76	26	
8	Hull Kingston Rovers	27	12	0	15	498	608	−110	24	
9	Hull FC	27	11	0	16	508	675	−167	22	
10	Wakefield Trinity	27	10	0	17	497	648	−151	20	
11	Warrington Wolves	27	9	0	18	568	664	−96	18	
12	Toulouse Olympique (R)	27	5	0	22	421	745	−324	10	Relegated to the Championship

(C) Champions; (L) League Leaders' Shield winners; (R) Relegated

==== Super League results ====
W Win D Draw L Loss

Super League results
Date	Round	Versus	H/A	Venue	Result	Score	Tries	Goals	Attendance	Report
10 February	1	Catalans Dragons	H	Totally Wicked Stadium	W	28–8			13,178	RLP
19 February	2	Hull FC	A	MKM Stadium	W	38–6			12,673	RLP
25 February	3	Wakefield Trinity	H	Totally Wicked Stadium	W	20–4			10,361	RLP
4 March	4	Hull Kingston Rovers	A	Sewell Group Craven Park	W	42–8			7,256	RLP
11 March	5	Warrington Wolves	H	Totally Wicked Stadium	W	28–2			16,118	RLP
19 March	6	Toulouse Olympique	A	Stade Ernest Wallon	L	20–22			5,568	RLP
1 April	7	Leeds Rhinos	A	Headingley	W	26–0			14,083	RLP
15 April	8	Wigan Warriors	H	Totally Wicked Stadium	W	22–4			17.980	RLP
18 April	9	Huddersfield Giants	A	John Smiths Stadium	W	24–12			6,519	RLP
22 April	10	Castleford Tigers	A	Mend-A-Hose Jungle	L	10–30			7,649	RLP
29 April	11	Salford Red Devils	H	Totally Wicked Stadium	W	14–10			10,988	RLP
13 May	12	Hull FC	H	Totally Wicked Stadium	W	24–10			11,268	RLP
19 May	13	Warrington Wolves	A	Halliwell Jones Stadium	W	12–10			10,476	RLP
4 June	14	Toulouse Olympique	A	Stade Ernest Wallon	W	28–14			5,225	RLP
12 June	15	Hull KR	H	Totally Wicked Stadium	W	26–18			9,858	RLP
23 June	16	Leeds Rhinos	A	Headingley	W	42–12			11,628	RLP
2 July	17	Catalans Dragons	A	Stade Gilbert Brutus	L	18–20			10,260	RLP
9 July	18	Wigan Warriors	N	St James' Park	W	20–18			36,821	RLP
15 July	19	Huddersfield Giants	H	Totally Wicked Stadium	W	25–0			11,288	RLP
24 July	20	Wakefield Trinity	A	Be Well Support Stadium	W	13–12			4,162	RLP
31 July	21	Salford Red Devils	A	AJ Bell Stadium	L	12–44			6,041	RLP
7 August	22	Castleford Tigers	H	Totally Wicked Stadium	W	20–12			10,144	RLP
14 August	23	Hull FC	A	MKM Stadium	W	60–6			10,097	RLP
19 August	24	Hull KR	H	Totally Wicked Stadium	W	38–12			10,048	RLP
26 August	25	Wigan Warriors	A	DW Stadium	L	10–30			19,210	RLP
29 August	26	Wakefield Trinity	H	Totally Wicked Stadium	L	18–34			8,222	RLP
3 September	27	Toulouse Olympique	H	Totally Wicked Stadium	W	36–16			13,112	RLP

==== Play-offs ====
Play-off results
Date	Round	Versus	H/A	Venue	Result	Score	Tries	Goals	Attendance	Report
17 September	Semi-finals	Salford Red Devils	H	Totally Wicked Stadium	W	19–12	Batchelor (2), Bennison	Makinson (3), Lomax (FG)	12,357	RLP
24 September	Grand Final	Leeds Rhinos	N	Old Trafford	W	24–12	Bennison, Hurrell, Lees, Percival	Makinson (4)	60,783	RLP

===== Team bracket =====
Eliminators
4	Catalans Dragons	10
5	Leeds Rhinos	20
3	Huddersfield Giants	0
6	Salford Red Devils	28

Semi-finals
2	Wigan Warriors	8
5	Leeds Rhinos	20
1	St Helens	19
6	Salford Red Devils	12

Grand Final
5	Leeds Rhinos	12
1	St Helens	24

Source:Rugby League Project

=== Challenge Cup ===
W Win L Loss

Challenge Cup results
Date	Round	Versus	H/A	Venue	Result	Score	Tries	Goals	Attendance	Report
26 March	6	Whitehaven	A	Recreation Ground	W	46–4	Amor, Batchelor, Dodd, Lussick, Norman, Percival, Roby, Sironen	Makinson (7)	4,869	RLP
9 April	Quarter-final	Catalans Dragons	A	Stade Gilbert Brutus	W	36–20	Batchelor, Dodd, Knowles, Norman, Percival, Welsby	Makinson (6)	8,624	RLP
7 May	Semi-final	Wigan Warriors	N	Elland Road	L	18–20	Hurrell, Lomax, Roby	Makinson (3)	22,141	RLP

== Players ==
=== Squad ===
2022 St Helens First Team
First team squad			Coaching staff
1 (England) Jack Welsby – FB, SO; 2 (England) Tommy Makinson – WG; 3 (Tonga) Will Hopoate – FB, CE, WG; 4 (England) Mark Percival – CE, WG; 5 (Wales) Regan Grace – WG; 6 (England) Jonny Lomax – SO, SH, FB; 7 (England) Lewis Dodd – SH; 8 (England) Alex Walmsley – PR; 9 (England) James Roby – HK, HB (c); 10 (England) Matty Lees – PR; 11 (Samoa) Sione Mata’utia – SR, CE; 12 (England) Joe Batchelor – SR; 13 (England) Morgan Knowles – LF, SR	14 (Australia) Joey Lussick – HK; 15 (Ireland) Louie McCarthy-Scarsbrook – PR, LF; 16 (Australia) Curtis Sironen – SR; 17 (Tonga) Agnatius Paasi – PR; 18; 19 (England) Jake Wingfield – LF; 20 (Scotland) James Bell – SR, LF; 21 (England) Josh Simm – WG, CE; 22 (England) Ben Davies – CE, SO; 23 (Tonga) Konrad Hurrell – CE; 24 (England) Dan Norman – PR; 25 (England) Matty Foster – SR; 26 (England) Sam Royle – SR	27 (England) Jon Bennison – WG, FB; 28 (England) Lewis Baxter – LF; 29 (England) Daniel Hill – CE; 30 (England) Jumah Sambou – WG; 31 (England) Taylor Pemberton – HK; 32 (England) Shay Martyn – WG; 33 (England) Daniel Moss – SH; 34 (England) George Delaney – PR; 35 (England) McKenzie Buckley – PR; 36 (England) Rio-Osaywanbo Corkill – SR; 37 (England) Ellis Archer – SH; 38 (England) Keane Gilford – WG; 39 (England) Ben Lane – WG	Head coach: Kristian Woolf; Assistant coach: Paul Wellens; Legend: (c) Captain(s); (vc) Vice-captain(s); Updated: 24 July 2022; Source(s): 2022 Squad Numbers

=== Transfers ===
==== Gains ====
Player	Club	Contract	Date
(Tonga) Will Hopoate	Canterbury Bulldogs	2 Years	August 2021
(Australia) Curtis Sironen	Manly Sea Eagles	2 Years	September 2021
(Australia) Joey Lussick	Parramatta Eels	3 Years	September 2021
(Scotland) James Bell	Leigh Centurions	2 Years	September 2021
(Tonga) Konrad Hurrell	Leeds Rhinos	1 Year	October 2021

==== Losses ====
Player	Club	Contract	Date
(Ireland) James Bentley	Leeds Rhinos	2 Years	June 2021
(Australia) Joel Thompson	Retired	—N/a	June 2021
(Scotland) Lachlan Coote	Hull KR	2 Years	July 2021
(France) Theo Fages	Huddersfield Giants	3 Years	October 2021
(Fiji) Kevin Naiqama	Sydney Roosters	1 Year	December 2021
