= Daniel Moss =

Daniel Moss may refer to:

- Dan Moss (born 2000), English footballer
- Daniel Moss (rugby league) (born 2002), English rugby league player
- Danny Moss (1927–2008), British jazz tenor saxophonist
