= Tom White (rugby league, born 1893) =

English rugby league footballer

Personal information
- Full name: Thomas White
- Born: 1 August 1893 Prescot, England
- Died: ≤25 February 1927 (aged 33) St. Helens, England

Playing information
- Position: Wing, Centre, Stand-off, Scrum-half
Club
Years	Team	Pld	T	G	FG	P
1913–20	St. Helens	48	10	0	0	30

Thomas White (1 August 1893 – 1927) was an English professional rugby league footballer who played in the 1910s and 1920s. He played at club level for St. Helens, as a wing, centre, stand-off, or scrum-half.

== Background ==
Tom White was born in Prescot, Lancashire, England, he was the manager of the St. Helens branch of Messrs. W & T Avery Ltd.'s Weights and Measures, he died aged 33 at home on Crab Street, St. Helens of a heart attack following an attempt to kick start his motorbike outside W & T Avery Ltd. on Claughton Street, St. Helens, Lancashire, England.

== Playing career ==
=== Challenge Cup Final appearances ===
Tom White played at centre in St Helens' 3-37 defeat by Huddersfield in the 1915 Challenge Cup Final during the 1914–15 season at Watersheddings, Oldham on Saturday 1 May 1915, in front of a crowd of 8,000.
