= Lewis Baxter =

English rugby league footballer

Personal information
- Full name: Lewis Baxter
- Born: 1 June 2002 (age 23)
- Height: 6 ft 0 in (1.82 m)
- Weight: 14 st 5 lb (91 kg)

Playing information
- Position: Second-row, Prop
Club
Years	Team	Pld	T	G	FG	P
2022–23	St Helens	4	0	0	0	0
2023(DR)	→Swinton Lions	5	0	0	0	0
2023(loan)	→North Wales Crusaders	5	0	0	0	0
2024	Leigh Leopards	2	0	0	0	0
2024(loan)	→Whitehaven RLFC	3	0	0	0	0
2024(loan)	→ Doncaster RLFC	9	0	0	0	0
2025–	Oldham RLFC	15	2	0	0	8
	Total	43	2	0	0	8
- Source: As of 27 November 2025

Lewis Baxter (born 1 June 2002) is a professional rugby league footballer who plays as a second-row or prop for Oldham RLFC in the RFL Championship.

== Playing career ==
=== St Helens ===
Baxter made his first team début for Saints (Heritage No. 1274) in April 2022 against the Castleford Tigers. On 21 September 2023, it was announced that Baxter would be departing St Helens at the end of the 2023 Super League season.

=== Leigh Leopards ===
On 14 October 2023 it was confirmed that he would be joining Leigh for the 2024 season on a one-year deal.

=== Whitehaven RLFC (loan) ===
On 12 July 2024 it was reported that he had signed for Whitehaven RLFC in the RFL Championship on two-weeks short-term loan.

=== Doncaster RLFC (loan) ===
On 3 August 2024 it was reported that he had signed for Doncaster RLFC in the RFL Championship on loan.

=== Oldham RLFC ===
On 24 October 2024 it was reported that he had signed for Oldham RLFC in the RFL Championship on a one-year deal.
