= Neil Rigby =

English rugby league footballer

Personal information
- Full name: Neil Rigby
- Born: 5 February 1986 (age 39) England

Playing information
- Position: Prop, Second-row
Club
Years	Team	Pld	T	G	FG	P
2006	St. Helens	1	0	0	0	0
2008–11	Swinton Lions	69	9	0	0	36
	Total	70	9	0	0	36

Neil Rigby is an English former professional rugby league footballer, who played professionally for St. Helens in the Super League before leaving for his current, Championship 1 team Swinton Lions. He plays primarily as a second-row. He signed professionally for St Helens from Blackbrook Royals ARLFC. He made his only first-grade appearance in St Helens' 2006's Super League XI 26-22 defeat away to Catalans Dragons in 2006, where St Helens played a mostly reserve team, resting many of the first-team players who would play in the Challenge Cup final. He came on off the bench. He left St Helens at the end of this season for Swinton, where he currently plays as a semi-professional. He left Swinton and coaches amateur team Thatto Heath Crusaders.
