= Lewis Dodd =

English rugby league footballer

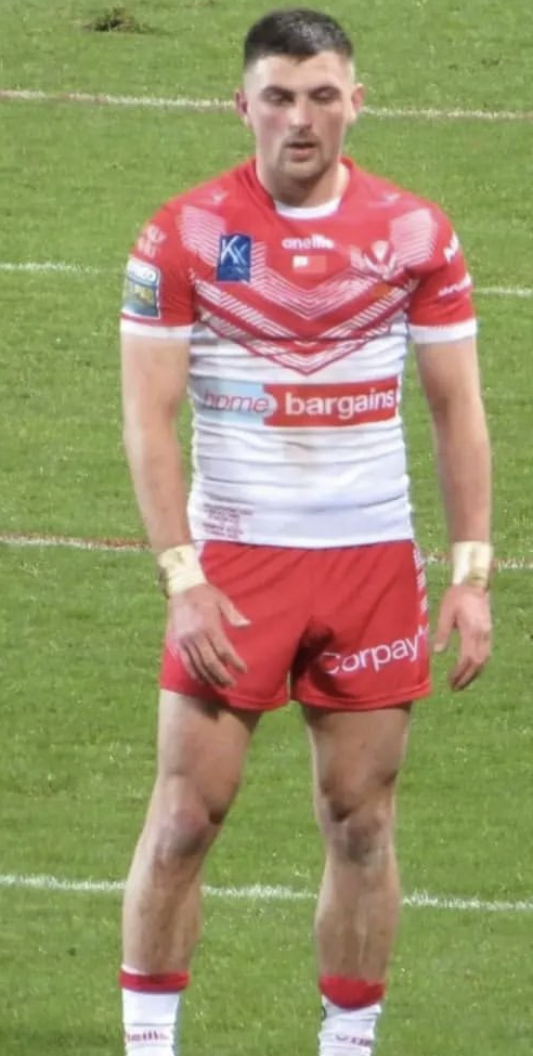

Personal information
- Full name: Lewis Dodd
- Born: 27 January 2002 (age 24) Widnes, Cheshire, England
- Height: 5 ft 11 in (1.80 m)
- Weight: 13 st 12 lb (88 kg)

Playing information
- Position: Scrum-half
Club
Years	Team	Pld	T	G	FG	P
2020–24	St Helens	88	30	13	2	152
2025	South Sydney	6	0	0	0	0
2026–	Catalans Dragons	27	6	0	0	24
	Total	121	36	13	2	176
- Source: As of 6 October 2025

Lewis Dodd (born 27 January 2002) is an English professional rugby league footballer who plays as a scrum-half for the Catalans Dragons in the Super League.

He previously played for St Helens in the Super League, winning the 2021 Super League Grand Final and the 2023 World Club Challenge.

== Background ==
Dodd was born in Widnes, England. He is of Welsh descent.

== Playing career ==
He signed for Saints Academy in 2017 from amateur team, Halton Hornets.

=== St Helens ===
Lewis made his first team début for St Helens (Heritage No. 1253) on 29 September 2020, coming off the substitutes' bench in the second half to fill the hooker role, when James Roby left the field, in the Super League XXV 42–0 defeat of Wigan Warriors. Wigan were fielding a weakened side, giving débuts to a number of young players, in advance of their Challenge Cup semi-final draw in a few days.

Dodd played for St. Helens in their 2021 Super League Grand Final victory over Catalans Dragons. It was the club's third successive championship victory in a row. Following St Helens Good Friday victory over Wigan in the 2022 Super League season, it was revealed that Dodd would miss the remainder of the year after suffering an achilles injury.

In the 2023 World Club Challenge, Dodd kicked the match-winning field goal in golden point extra time to give St Helens a 13–12 victory over 2022 NRL premiers the Penrith Panthers, and their first World Club Challenge title since 2007. In round 13 of the 2023 Super League season, Dodd kicked a drop goal for St Helens in golden point extra-time to win the match 13–12 over Leeds. Dodd played 29 games for St Helens in the 2023 Super League season as the club finished third on the table. Dodd played in St Helens narrow loss against the Catalans Dragons in the semi-final which stopped them reaching a fifth successive grand final. Dodd played 20 games for St Helens in the 2024 Super League season which saw the club finish sixth on the table. He played in St Helens golden point extra-time playoff loss against Warrington which was also his last game for the club.

=== South Sydney Rabbitohs ===
On 5 May 2024, Dodd signed a three-year deal to join NRL side South Sydney starting in 2025. On 24 February 2025, Dodd was suspended for one game after accepting an early guilty plea for a high tackle during South Sydney's heavy loss in the Charity Shield. Dodd came under scrutiny from supporters and sections of the media for his below par performances in the Charity Shield and previous trial game. In round 7 of the season, Dodd made his club debut off the interchange bench in a 32–0 loss against Canterbury-Bankstown. Following Souths' 30–4 Magic Round loss against Newcastle, Dodd was demoted to NSW Cup by Wayne Bennett. After spending nearly four months in reserve grade, Dodd was recalled to the South Sydney side for their round 20 match against Penrith. In August, it was reported that Dodd was told by Souths officials he was free to negotiate with other clubs ahead of the 2026 season. Dodd made six appearances for South Sydney in 2025, all losses, as the club finished 14th on the table. On 30 September, the South Sydney club announced that they had officially released Dodd from his contract.

=== Catalans Dragons ===
On 6 October 2025 it was reported that he had signed for Catalans Dragons in the Super League. Dodd made his club debut for Catalans in round 3 of the Challenge Cup against Batley which ended in a 56-4 victory.
