= Tom Barton (rugby league) =

England international rugby league footballer

Personal information
- Full name: Thomas Barton
- Born: 15 January 1883
- Died: March 1958 (aged 75)

Playing information
- Position: Fullback, Wing, Centre, Forward
Club
| Years | Team | Pld | T | G | FG | P |
|---|---|---|---|---|---|---|
| 1903–21 | St. Helens | 226 | 97 | 118 | 0 | 527 |
Representative
| Years | Team | Pld | T | G | FG | P |
| 1906 | England | 1 | 0 | 0 | 0 | 0 |
- Relatives: Jack Barton (brother)

Thomas Barton (15 January 1883 – March 1958 (aged 75)) was an English professional rugby league footballer who played in the 1900s. He played at representative level for England, and at club level for St Helens (captain), as a fullback, wing, centre, or forward.

== Playing career ==
=== Club career ===
Barton played on the wing in St. Helens' 3–37 defeat by Huddersfield in the 1915 Challenge Cup Final during the 1914–15 season at Watersheddings, Oldham on Saturday 1 May 1915, in front of a crowd of 8,000.

=== International honours ===
Barton won a cap for England while at St. Helens in 1906 against Other Nationalities.

Barton was considered a "Probable" for the 1910 Great Britain Lions tour of Australia and New Zealand, but ultimately he was not selected for the tour.

== Personal life ==
Tom Barton was the younger brother of the rugby league fullback who played in the 1890s for St. Helens, and Castleford; Jack Barton.
