= Jack Barton =

English rugby league footballer

Personal information
- Full name: Jack Barton
- Born: 22 March 1876 Standish, Wigan, England
- Died: September 1952 (aged 76) St Helens, Lancashire, England

Playing information
- Position: Forward
Club
Years	Team	Pld	T	G	FG	P
1896	St Helens	1	0	0	0	0
189?–00	Castleford
1901–10	Wigan	213	15	1	0	47
	Total	214	15	1	0	47
- Source: wigan.rlfans.com
- Relatives: Tom Barton (brother)

Jack Barton (birth unknown – death unknown) was an English professional rugby league footballer who played between 1901 and 1910. He played at club level for Wigan as a forward.

== Playing career ==
Born in Standish, Barton started his career with local side Standish South End before signing for Wigan in 1901. He made his début for Wigan in December 1901 against Altrincham at Springfield Park. Barton also played in the Wigan's first match at Central Park against Batley in 1902. Barton spent nine years at Wigan, playing 213 first team games for the club and scoring 15 tries.

=== County Cup Final appearances ===
Jack Barton played as a forward in Wigan's 0–0 draw with Leigh in the 1905 Lancashire Cup Final during the 1905–06 season at Wheater's Field, Broughton, on Saturday 2 December 1905, played as a forward in the 8–0 victory over Leigh in the 1905 Lancashire Cup Final replay during the 1905–06 season at Wheater's Field, Broughton, on Monday 11 December 1905, played as a forward in the 10–9 victory over Oldham in the 1908 Lancashire Cup Final during the 1908–09 season at Wheater's Field, Broughton, on Saturday 19 December 1908, and played as a forward in the 22–5 victory over Leigh in the 1909 Lancashire Cup Final during the 1909–10 season at Wheater's Field, Broughton, on Saturday 27 November 1909.

== Honours ==
=== Club ===
Wigan

Championship (1): 1908–09

Lancashire League (2): 1901–02, 1908–09

Lancashire Cup (3): 1905, 1908, 1909

South West Lancashire League (2): 1904–05, 1905–06
