= Paul Anderson (rugby league, born 1977) =

English rugby league footballer

Personal information
- Born: 2 April 1977 (age 49) Leigh, Greater Manchester, England

Playing information
- Height: 6 ft 4 in (1.93 m)
- Weight: 16 st 5 lb (104 kg)
- Position: Centre, Second-row, Loose forward
Club
Years	Team	Pld	T	G	FG	P
1995–98	St. Helens	46	6	2	0	28
1999	Sheffield Eagles	10	1	0	0	4
1999–02	Leigh Centurions	103	50	17	0	234
2003	Oldham	22	8	0	0	32
2004–07	Rochdale Hornets	64	68	36	0	344
2008	Blackpool Panthers	44	14	0	0	56
	Total	289	147	55	0	698

Coaching information
Club
Years	Team	Gms	W	D	L	W%
2011–2020	Leigh Centurions	306	253			83

Paul Anderson (born 2 April 1977) is an English former professional rugby league footballer who played in the 1990s and 2000s. He played at club level for St. Helens, Sheffield Eagles, Leigh Centurions, Oldham and Rochdale Hornets, as a centre, second-row, or loose forward.

== Playing career ==
=== St Helens ===
Anderson began his playing career in 1995 with St Helens, and played 46 games for the club. He made his Debut on Boxing Day 1995 in a game against Wigan Warriors at Central Park. Anderson wore #11 playing in the second row in a tough loss to their Super League rivals

=== Sheffield Eagles ===
In January 1999, he was signed by Sheffield Eagles for a fee of £10,000.

=== Leigh ===
Anderson joined Leigh Centurions later that year, where we went on make over 100 appearances, and also played for Oldham and Rochdale Hornets.
