= Joe Ball (rugby league) =

English rugby league footballer

Personal information
- Full name: Joseph Ball
- Born: 1 April 1927; St Helens, Merseyside, England
- Died: 6 October 1964 (aged 37)

Playing information
- Height: 5 ft 5 in (1.65 m)
- Position: Fullback, Scrum-half
Club
Years	Team	Pld	T	G	FG	P
1943–55	St. Helens	135	14	152	0	346
1955–61	Barrow
	Total	135	14	152	0	346

Joseph Ball (1 April 1927 – 6 October 1964) was an English rugby league footballer who played as a fullback or scrum-half for St Helens and Barrow.

== Biography ==
Ball started his career with St Helens in 1943, playing 135 games for moving to Barrow in 1955, He spent six seasons with Barrow, Joe Ball played fullback in Barrow's 7-9 defeat by Leeds in the 1957 Challenge Cup Final during the 1956–57 season at Wembley Stadium, London on Saturday 11 May 1957, in front of a crowd of 76,318.

Ball's son, Ian, also played for Barrow.

After suffering from cancer, Ball died in hospital on 6 October 1964, aged 37.
