= Rio-Osayomwanbo Corkill =

Nigeria international rugby league footballer

Rio Corkill
Personal information
- Full name: Rio-Osayomwanbo Corkill
- Born: 29 September 2002 (age 23) Barrow-in-Furness, Cumbria, England

Playing information
- Position: Loose forward, Centre
Club
Years	Team	Pld	T	G	FG	P
2022	St Helens	1	0	0	0	0
2023	Barrow Raiders	13	3	0	0	12
2024	Whitehaven	27	5	0	0	20
2025	Workington Town	10	4	0	0	16
	Total	51	12	0	0	48
Representative
Years	Team	Pld	T	G	FG	P
2022–	Nigeria	3	0	1	0	2
- Source: As of 10 June 2025

Rio-Osayomwanbo Corkill (born 29 September 2002) is a professional rugby league footballer who plays as a second-row forward for Workington Town in the RFL Championship.

He previously played for St Helens in the Super League.

== Playing career ==
=== St Helens ===
Corkill made his first team début for Saints in August 2022 against the Wakefield Trinity.

=== Whitehaven RLFC ===
On 26 September 2023 it was reported that he had signed for Whitehaven R.L.F.C. in the RFL Championship.

=== Workington Town ===
Corkill signed for Workington Town ahead of the 2025 season.

=== Representative ===
In 2022, Corkill represented Nigeria at the 2022 MEA Rugby League Championship. He played in both matches which Nigeria won to retain the title. He played for Nigeria when they played Cumbria in a 70-6 loss in Barrow.
