= Sam Royle =

English rugby league footballer

Personal information
- Full name: Sam Royle
- Born: 12 February 2000 (age 25) Thatto Heath, St Helens, Merseyside, England

Playing information
- Height: 6 ft 0 in (1.82 m)
- Weight: 14 st 13 lb (95 kg)
- Position: Second-row
Club
Years	Team	Pld	T	G	FG	P
2021–24	St Helens	27	0	0	0	0
2022(loan)	→ Hull Kingston Rovers	3	2	0	0	8
2024(DR)	→Swinton Lions	0	0	0	0	0
	Total	30	2	0	0	8

Sam Royle (born 12 February 2000) is a former rugby league footballer who last played as a second-row forward for St Helens.

== Playing career ==
=== St Helens ===
He signed with the St Helens academy from Thatto Heath Crusaders RFC at the age of 11. He won the St Helens Under-19's Academy Player of the Year in 2019.

=== Swinton Lions (DR loan) ===
On 20 December 2023 it was reported that he joined Swinton Lions in the RFL Championship on DR loan He left St Helens at the end of the 2024 season to pursue an opportunity outside of rugby league.
