= Dan Hill (rugby league) =

English rugby league footballer

Personal information
- Full name: Daniel Hill
- Born: 15 July 2002 (age 22); Warrington, Cheshire, England
- Height: 6 ft 0 in (1.84 m)
- Weight: 12 st 0 lb (76 kg)

Playing information
- Position: Fullback, Centre, Wing
Club
Years	Team	Pld	T	G	FG	P
2021	Widnes Vikings	6	1	0	0	4
2022–23	St Helens	2	0	0	0	0
2023(loan)	→North Wales Crusaders	5	3	0	0	12
2023(DR)	→Swinton Lions	1	0	0	0	0
	Total	14	4	0	0	16
- Source: As of 3 February 2024

Dan Hill (born 15 July 2002) is a professional rugby league footballer who last played as a fullback, centre or winger for St Helens in the Super League.

He previously played for the Widnes Vikings in the Championship. Hill made his first team début for Saints in April 2022 against the Castleford Tigers.
