= 1914–15 Challenge Cup =

Rugby league competition

1915 Challenge Cup
- Duration: 5 rounds
- Winners: Huddersfield
- Runners-up: St Helens

The 1915 Challenge Cup was the 19th staging of rugby league's oldest knockout competition, the Challenge Cup.

== First round ==
| Date | Team one | Score one | Team two | Score two |
|---|---|---|---|---|
| 27 Feb | Barrow | 15 | Wakefield Trinity | 8 |
| 27 Feb | Bradford Northern | 2 | Batley | 0 |
| 27 Feb | Brighouse Rangers | 0 | Salford | 26 |
| 27 Feb | Broughton Moor | 6 | Wardley | 3 |
| 27 Feb | Broughton Rangers | 14 | Runcorn | 4 |
| 27 Feb | Featherstone Rovers | 0 | St Helens | 6 |
| 27 Feb | Halifax | 6 | Bramley | 2 |
| 27 Feb | Hull FC | 23 | Dewsbury | 2 |
| 27 Feb | Hull Kingston Rovers | 10 | Hunslet | 0 |
| 27 Feb | Keighley | 8 | Askam | 5 |
| 27 Feb | Leigh | 0 | Huddersfield | 3 |
| 27 Feb | Oldham | 5 | Wigan | 10 |
| 27 Feb | Warrington | 5 | Leeds | 4 |
| 27 Feb | Widnes | 13 | St Helens Recs | 4 |
| 27 Feb | Wigan Highfield | 0 | Swinton | 2 |
| 27 Feb | York | 0 | Rochdale Hornets | 0 |
| 02 Mar | Rochdale Hornets | 19 | York | 2 |

== Second round ==
| Date | Team one | Score one | Team two | Score two |
|---|---|---|---|---|
| 13 Mar | Bradford Northern | 3 | Wigan | 11 |
| 13 Mar | Broughton Rangers | 8 | Hull Kingston Rovers | 5 |
| 13 Mar | Hull FC | 22 | Halifax | 0 |
| 13 Mar | Keighley | 22 | Barrow | 8 |
| 13 Mar | Rochdale Hornets | 75 | Broughton Moor | 13 |
| 13 Mar | Swinton | 0 | St Helens | 5 |
| 13 Mar | Warrington | 2 | Salford | 11 |
| 13 Mar | Widnes | 3 | Huddersfield | 29 |

== Quarterfinals ==
| Date | Team one | Score one | Team two | Score two |
|---|---|---|---|---|
| 27 Mar | Huddersfield | 33 | Salford | 0 |
| 27 Mar | Keighley | 2 | St Helens | 3 |
| 27 Mar | Rochdale Hornets | 11 | Hull FC | 0 |
| 27 Mar | Wigan | 11 | Broughton Rangers | 5 |

== Semifinals ==
| Date | Team one | Score one | Team two | Score two |
|---|---|---|---|---|
| 10 Apr | Huddersfield | 27 | Wigan | 2 |
| 10 Apr | St Helens | 5 | Rochdale Hornets | 5 |
| 24 Apr | St Helens | 9 | Rochdale Hornets | 2 |

== Final ==
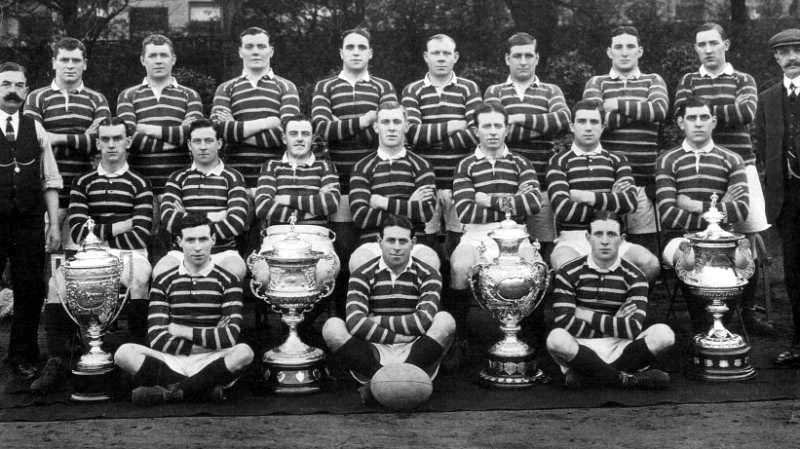
The 1915 Huddersfield team with their season's trophy haul (Challenge Cup centre right)

Huddersfield defeated St. Helens 37–3 in the Challenge Cup Final, on 1 May, held at Watersheddings, Oldham before a crowd of 8,000.

This was Huddersfield's second Challenge Cup win in as many Final appearances.

At one point St Helens' players refused to enter the field of play unless promised bonuses for reaching the final were paid by the Committee

St Helens team - 1 Bert Roberts, 2 Tom Barton, 3 Jimmy Flanagan, 4 Tom White, 5 Henry Greenall, 6 Matt Creevey, 7 Fred Trenwith, 8 George Farrimond, 9 Sam Daniels – Try, 10 James Shallcross, 11 William Jackson, 12 Tom Durkin, 13 William Myers
