= Jake Wingfield =

English rugby league footballer

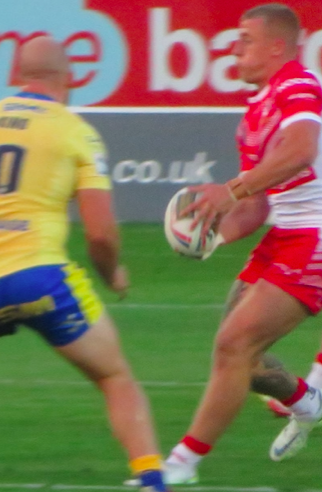

Personal information
- Full name: Jake Wingfield
- Born: 1 August 2001 (age 25) Leigh, Greater Manchester, England
- Height: 6 ft 2 in (1.87 m)
- Weight: 15 st 6 lb (98 kg)

Playing information
- Position: Loose forward, Second-row
Club
Years	Team	Pld	T	G	FG	P
2020–	St Helens	69	1	0	0	4
2022(loan)	→ Leigh Centurions	1	0	0	0	0
	Total	70	1	0	0	4
- Source: As of 13 August 2026

Jake Wingfield (born 1 August 2001) is an English professional rugby league footballer who plays as a loose forward forward for St Helens in the Super League.

== Background ==
Wingfield signed from Blackbrook ARLFC and came through the Saints scholarship programme. He also spent 2014 to 2016 with the Parramatta Eels.

== Career ==
Wingfield made his first team début for St Helens as a second-row against the Salford Red Devils on 26 Oct 2020. Due to end-of-season fixture congestion caused by the COVID-19 pandemic, Saints fielded a very young side, resting the majority of first team players, in preparation of their derby match against the Wigan Warriors just four days later. On 24 September 2022, Wingfield played for St Helens in their 2022 Super League Grand Final victory over Leeds. On 18 February 2023, Wingfield played in St Helens 13-12 upset victory over Penrith in the 2023 World Club Challenge.

Wingfield scored his first senior try coming off the bench in a match against Halifax in The Betfred Challenge Cup which resulted in a St Helens victory 6-26. Wingfield played eight games for St Helens in the 2023 Super League season as the club finished third on the table. Wingfield was limited to just eight matches for St Helens in the 2024 Super League season which saw the club finish sixth on the table.

In April 2026, Wingfield was ruled out for the remainder of the 2026 Super League season with an ACL injury.
