= Ellis Archer =

English rugby league footballer

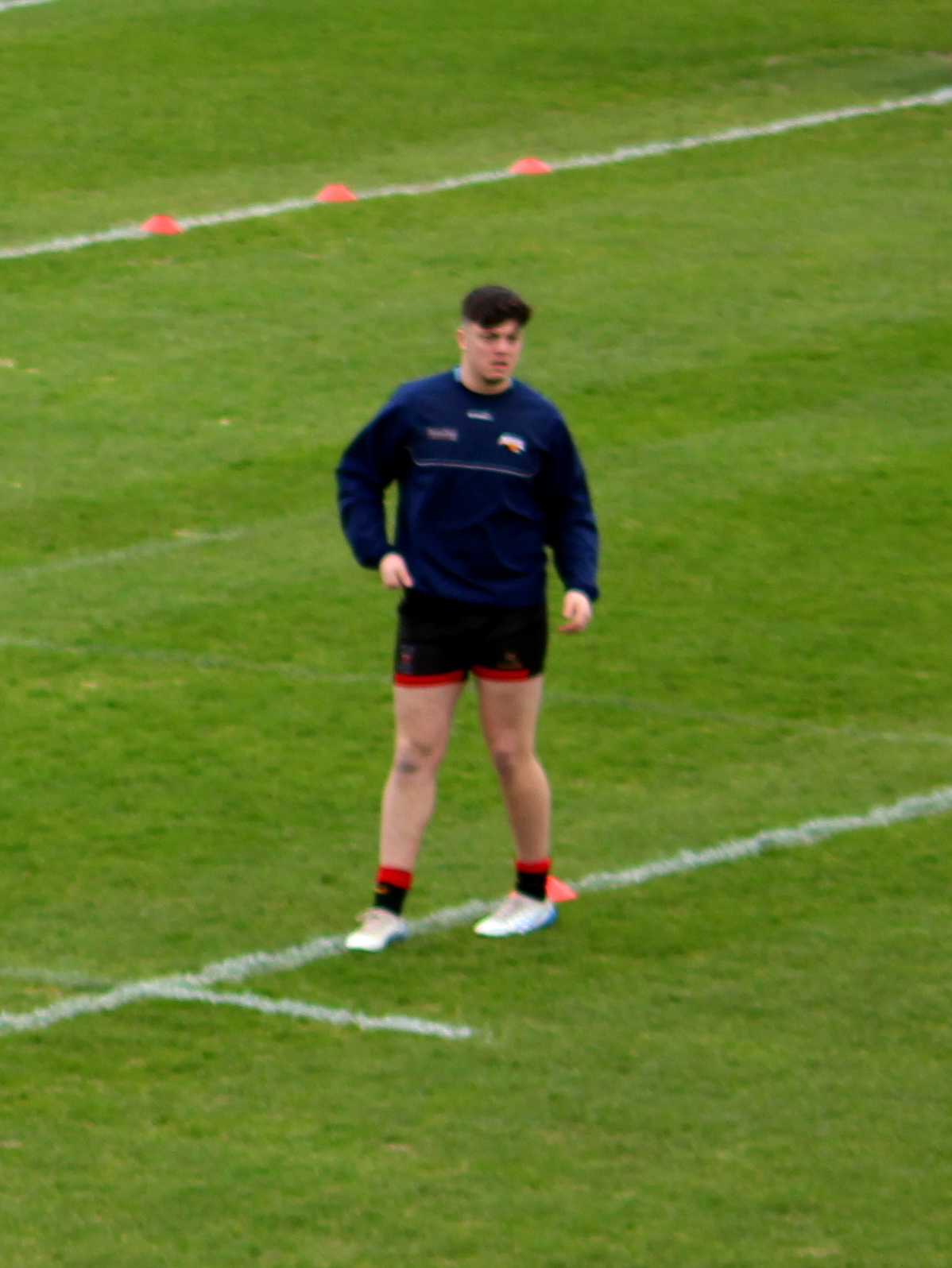

Personal information
- Full name: Ellis Archer
- Born: 21 April 2004 (age 22) Barrow-in-Furness, Cumbria, England

Playing information
- Position: Scrum-half, Stand-off, Loose forward
Club
Years	Team	Pld	T	G	FG	P
2022	St Helens	1	0	0	0	0
2023	Barrow Raiders	5	0	1	0	2
2024–25	Workington Town	9	1	0	0	4
2026–	Barrow Raiders	4	4	0	0	16
	Total	19	5	1	0	22
Representative
Years	Team	Pld	T	G	FG	P
2025	Cumbria	0	0	0	0	0
- Source: As of 16 March 2026

Ellis Archer is a semi-professional rugby league footballer who last played as a scrum-half for the Barrow Raiders in the Betfred Championship.

He started his senior career at St Helens in the Super League. He previously played for Workington Town in the RFL Championship.

== Playing career ==
=== St Helens ===
Archer made his first team début for Saints in August 2022 against Wakefield Trinity.

=== Workington Town ===
On 27 September 2023 it was reported that he had signed for Workington Town in the RFL Championship on a two-year deal.
