= Dan Norman (rugby league) =

Ireland international rugby league footballer

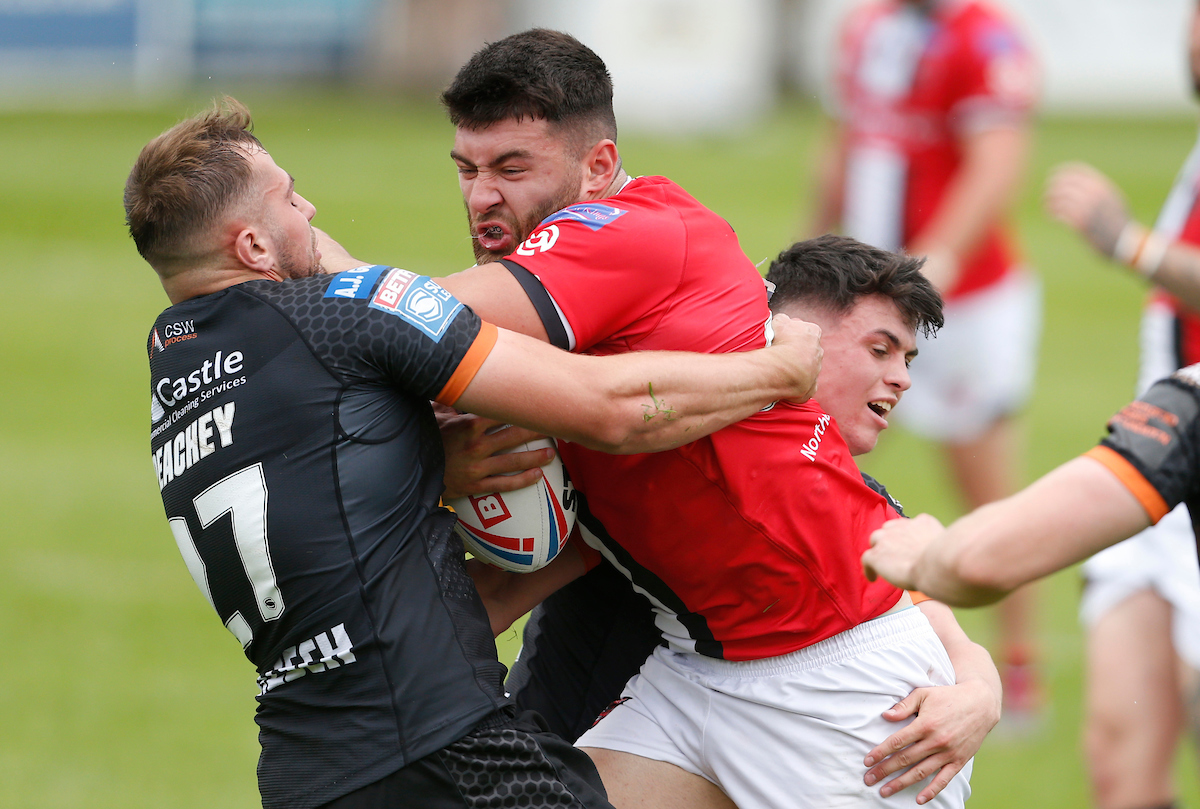

Personal information
- Full name: Daniel Norman
- Born: 8 September 1997 (age 29) Warrington, Cheshire, England
- Height: 6 ft 5 in (1.96 m)
- Weight: 17 st 5 lb (110 kg)

Playing information
- Position: Prop
Club
| Years | Team | Pld | T | G | FG | P |
|---|---|---|---|---|---|---|
| 2018–19 | Widnes Vikings | 20 | 1 | 0 | 0 | 4 |
| 2018(loan) | → North Wales Crusaders | 13 | 1 | 0 | 0 | 4 |
| 2020 | London Broncos | 5 | 0 | 0 | 0 | 0 |
| 2021–23 | St Helens | 15 | 2 | 0 | 0 | 8 |
| 2021(loan) | → Salford Red Devils | 1 | 1 | 0 | 0 | 4 |
| 2022(DR) | → Leigh Leopards | 2 | 1 | 0 | 0 | 4 |
| 2023(DR) | → Swinton Lions | 4 | 0 | 0 | 0 | 0 |
| 2023(DR) | → Leigh Leopards | 0 | 0 | 0 | 0 | 0 |
| 2024–2024 | Leigh Leopards | 0 | 0 | 0 | 0 | 0 |
| | Total | 60 | 6 | 0 | 0 | 24 |
Representative
| Years | Team | Pld | T | G | FG | P |
| 2022– | Ireland | 1 | 0 | 0 | 0 | 0 |
- Source: As of 14 October 2023

Dan Norman (born 8 September 1997) is a former Ireland international rugby league footballer who last played prop for Leigh Leopards in the Super League.

He previously played for the Widnes Vikings and St Helens in the Super League and the Championship, and on loan from Widnes Vikings at the North Wales Crusaders in RFL League 1. He has also played for the London Broncos in the Championship.

== Background ==
He was born in Warrington, Cheshire, England.

Dan attended birchwood community high school.

== Career ==
=== Widnes Vikings ===
Norman made his début for the Widnes club in the Super League against Salford in June 2018. He played 20 games and only scored 1 try.

=== North Wales Crusaders (loan) ===
In 2018, Norman signed (on loan) for the North Wales Crusaders where he played 13 games and scored 1 try for them.

=== Salford Red Devils (loan) ===
On 8 July 2021 it was reported that he had joined Salford in the Super League on a short loan On 9 August 2021 it was reported that he had re-joined the Salford club in the Super League on a one-week loan, following the announcement of Prop Lee Mossop's immediate retirement due to injury.

=== Leigh Leopards (DR) ===
He signed for the Leigh Leopards on DR loan of the 2022 season where he played twice and scored once.

=== St Helens ===
In 2021, it was reported that he went to St Helens in the Super League with a one-year deal. Norman would later in 2022 sign another contract for St Helens for another year. On 21 September 2023, it was announced that Norman would depart St Helens at the end of the 2023 Super League season.

=== Leigh Leopards ===
On 13 October 2023, it was reported that he had signed a permanent two-year deal to join Leigh Leopards for the 2024 season. Norman played 12 games for Leigh in the 2024 Super League season which saw the club finish fifth on the table.

On 22 November 2024 Dan announced his retirement from rugby league. As a result an early release was granted from his contract with the Leigh Leopards.

=== Ireland ===
In the 2022 Rugby League World Cup he was announced in the Ireland World Cup squad, and would later make his début versus New Zealand off of the bench.
