= Taylor Pemberton =

English rugby league footballer

Personal information
- Full name: Taylor Pemberton
- Born: 17 April 2003 (age 23) Leigh, Greater Manchester, England

Playing information
- Position: Hooker
Club
Years	Team	Pld	T	G	FG	P
2022–23	St Helens	2	0	0	0	0
2023(loan)	→ North Wales Crusaders	3	1	0	0	4
2023(loan)	→ York Knights	7	1	0	0	4
2024–	York Knights	8	0	17	0	34
2024(DR)	→ Newcastle Thunder	6	0	0	0	0
2026(DR)	→ Newcastle Thunder	1	0	0	0	0
	Total	27	2	17	0	42
- Source: As of 15 January 2025

Taylor Pemberton (born 17 April 2003) is a professional rugby league footballer who plays as a hooker for York Knights in the RFL Championship.

He previously played for St Helens in the Super League.

== Playing career ==
=== St Helens ===
Pemberton made his first team début for Saints in April 2022 against the Castleford Tigers. On 21 September 2023, it was announced that Pemberton would be departing St Helens at the end of the 2023 Super League season.

=== N Wales Crusaders (loan) ===
On 10 February 2023 it was announced he would join North Wales Crusaders on loan.

=== York Knights (loan) ===
On 4 August 2023 it was announced he would join York Knights on loan.

=== York Knights ===
On 25 October 2023, after an initial loan period, he decided to join York Knights on a permanent three-year deal for 2024
