= Daniel Moss (rugby league) =

English rugby league footballer

Danny Moss
Personal information
- Full name: Daniel Moss
- Born: 23 November 2002 (age 23) St Helens, Merseyside, England

Playing information
- Weight: 80 kg (176 lb; 12 st 8 lb)
- Position: Scrum-half, Stand-off, Fullback
Club
Years	Team	Pld	T	G	FG	P
2022–23	St Helens	2	0	0	0	0
2023(loan)	→ North Wales Crusaders	0	0	0	0	0
	Total	2	0	0	0	0

Daniel Moss (born 23 November 2002) is a professional rugby league footballer who last played as a scrum-half, stand-off or fullback for St Helens in the Super League.

== Playing career ==
=== St Helens ===
Moss made his first team debut for Saints in April 2022 against the Castleford Tigers. On 21 September 2023, it was announced that Moss would be departing St Helens at the end of the 2023 Super League season.

=== N Wales Crusaders (loan) ===
On 10 February 2023 it was announced he would join North Wales Crusaders on loan.
