= 1997 St Helens R.F.C. season =

- Super League II Rank: 3rd
- Play-off result: Premiership Trophy runners-up
- Challenge Cup: Winners
- 1997 record: Wins: 21; draws: 1; losses: 8
- Points scored: For: 856; against: 631

Team information
- Coach: Shaun McRae
- Stadium: Knowsley Road
← 1996	List of seasons	1998 →

The 1997 St Helens RLFC season was the 102nd season in the club's rugby league history and the second season in the Super League. Coached by Shaun McRae, the Saints competed in Super League II and finished in 3rd place, but went on to win the 1997 Challenge Cup, beating Bradford Bulls in the final for the second consecutive year.

== Table ==
Pos	Team	Pld	W	D	L	PF	PA	PD	Pts	Relegation
1	Bradford Bulls (C)	22	20	0	2	769	397	+372	40	
2	London Broncos	22	15	3	4	616	418	+198	33	
3	St Helens	22	14	1	7	592	506	+86	29	
4	Wigan	22	14	0	8	683	398	+285	28	
5	Leeds Rhinos	22	13	1	8	544	463	+81	27	
6	Salford Reds	22	11	0	11	428	495	−67	22	
7	Halifax Blue Sox	22	8	2	12	524	549	−25	18	
8	Sheffield Eagles	22	9	0	13	415	574	−159	18	
9	Warrington Wolves	22	8	0	14	437	647	−210	16	
10	Castleford Tigers	22	5	2	15	334	515	−181	12	
11	Paris Saint-Germain	22	6	0	16	362	572	−210	12	
12	Oldham Bears (R)	22	4	1	17	461	631	−170	9	Relegated to Division One

Source: Rugby League Project
Rules for classification: 1) Points; 2) Points difference; 3) Number of points scored;
(C) Champions; (R) Relegated

== Squad ==
No	Player	Apps	Tries	Goals	DGs	Points	Ref
1	Steve Prescott	20	6	0	0	24	
2	Joey Hayes	10	3	0	0	12	
3	Sean Long	19	7	40	0	108	
4	Paul Newlove	30	19	0	0	76	
5	Anthony Sullivan	38	27	0	0	108	
6	Karle Hammond	36	15	0	1	61	
7	Bobbie Goulding	20	2	77	1	163	
8	Apollo Perelini	27	3	0	0	12	
9	Keiron Cunningham	36	11	0	0	44	
10	Ian Pickavance	34	3	0	0	12	
11	Chris Joynt	34	6	0	0	24	
12	Simon Booth	10	1	0	0	4	
13	Dean Busby	7	0	0	0	0	
14	Danny Arnold	38	15	0	0	60	
15	Julian O'Neill	36	1	0	0	4	
16	Derek McVey	25	1	0	0	4	
17	Andy Leathem	19	1	0	0	4	
18	Andy Haigh	26	8	0	0	32	
19	Kevin O'Loughlin	4	0	0	0	0	
20	Tommy Martyn	12	10	5	0	50	
21	Alan Hunte	28	27	0	0	108	
22	Vila Matautia	33	0	0	0	0	
23	Andy Northey	23	2	0	0	8	
24	Chris Morley	34	3	0	0	12	
25	Paul Anderson	29	2	1	0	10	
30	Alan Cross	2	0	0	0	0	
33	Scott Barrow	2	0	0	0	0	
34	Richard Sheil	1	0	0	0	0	
35	Jason Johnson	2	0	0	0	0	

== Transfers ==
=== In ===
Player	Pos	From	Fee	Date	Ref
Sean Long	Scrum-half	Widnes Vikings	£80,000	June 1997	

=== Out ===
Player	Pos	To	Fee	Date	Ref
Lee Briers	Scrum-half	Warrington Wolves	£65,000	April 1997	
Steve Prescott	Fullback	Hull Sharks	£350,000	November 1997	
Alan Hunte	Wing	Hull Sharks	£350,000	November 1997	
Simon Booth	Second-row	Hull Sharks	£350,000	November 1997	
