= 1996 St Helens R.F.C. season =

- Super League I Rank: 1st
- Play-off result: Premiership Trophy runners-up
- Challenge Cup: Winners
- 1996 record: Wins: 26; draws: 0; losses: 3
- Points scored: For: 1215; against: 621

Team information
- Coach: Shaun McRae
- Stadium: Knowsley Road
List of seasons	1997 →

The 1996 St Helens RLFC season was the 101st season in the club's rugby league history and the first season in the Super League. Coached by Shaun McRae, the Saints competed in Super League I and finished in 1st place, and also went on to win the 1996 Challenge Cup, beating Bradford Bulls in the final.

== Table ==
Super League I
Pos	Team	Pld	W	D	L	PF	PA	PD	Pts	Qualification or relegation
1	St Helens (C)	22	20	0	2	950	455	+495	40	Qualified for Premiership semi final
2	Wigan	22	19	1	2	902	326	+576	39	Qualified for Premiership semi final
3	Bradford Bulls	22	17	0	5	767	409	+358	34	Qualified for Premiership semi final
4	London Broncos	22	12	1	9	611	462	+149	25	Qualified for Premiership semi final
5	Warrington Wolves	22	12	0	10	569	565	+4	24	
6	Halifax Blue Sox	22	10	1	11	667	576	+91	21	
7	Sheffield Eagles	22	10	0	12	599	730	−131	20	
8	Oldham Bears	22	9	1	12	473	681	−208	19	
9	Castleford Tigers	22	9	0	13	548	599	−51	18	
10	Leeds	22	6	0	16	555	745	−190	12	
11	Paris Saint-Germain	22	3	1	18	398	795	−397	7	
12	Workington Town (R)	22	2	1	19	325	1021	−696	5	Relegated to Division One

Source: Rugby League Project
Rules for classification: 1) Points; 2) Points difference; 3) Number of points scored;
(C) Champions; (R) Relegated

Squad Statistics include appearances and points in the Super League, Challenge Cup and Premiership Trophy.

Player	Apps	Tries	Goals	DGs	Points
Paul Anderson	1	0	0	0	0
Danny Arnold	23	25	0	0	100
Simon Booth	16	2	0	0	8
Dean Busby	3	0	0	0	0
Keiron Cunningham	29	13	0	0	52
Adam Fogerty	15	1	0	0	4
Scott Gibbs	13	6	0	0	24
Bobbie Goulding	26	6	153	4	334
Andy Haigh	13	3	0	0	12
Karle Hammond	29	15	0	1	61
Joey Hayes	12	8	0	0	32
Alan Hunte	23	14	0	0	56
Chris Joynt	24	4	0	0	16
Andy Leathem	14	0	0	0	0
John McAtee	3	0	0	0	0
Derek McVey	22	6	1	0	26
Tommy Martyn	17	9	2	0	40
Vila Matautia	21	7	0	0	28
Chris Morley	22	2	0	0	8
Jon Neill	1	0	0	0	0
Paul Newlove	27	36	0	0	144
Andy Northey	15	5	0	0	20
Apollo Perelini	27	12	0	0	48
Ian Pickavance	25	3	0	0	12
Steve Prescott	27	15	17	0	94
Anthony Sullivan	22	23	0	0	92
Phil Veivers	5	1	0	0	4
