= 1996 Rugby League Premiership =

1996 Premiership Trophy
- Structure: National knockout championship
- Winners: Wigan
- Runners-up: St Helens

The 1996 Rugby League Premiership Trophy was the 22nd end of season Rugby League Premiership competition and the first in the fully professional Super League era. This competition was separate to the Super League Championship awarded to St. Helens, and continued a long tradition in British rugby league of crowning a season Champion and an end of season Premier.

The winners were Wigan.

== Semi-finals ==
Date	Team one	Team two	Score
31 Aug	Wigan	Bradford Bulls	42-36
01 Sep	St Helens	London Broncos	25-14

== Final ==
8 September 1996

Wigan	44 – 14	St Helens
Tries: Ellison (3), Connolly, Edwards, Haughton, Paul, Robinson, Murdock; Goals: Farrell (4)		Tries: Newlove, Martyn; Goals: Goulding (3)

Old Trafford
Attendance: 35,013
Referee: David Campbell (Widnes)
Player of the Match: Andy Farrell

1	Kris Radlinski
2	Jason Robinson
3	Va'aiga Tuigamala
4	Gary Connolly
5	Danny Ellison
6	Henry Paul
7	Shaun Edwards
8	Kelvin Skerrett
9	Martin Hall
10	Terry O'Connor
11	Simon Haughton
12	Mick Cassidy
13	Andy Farrell
Substitutions:
14	Andy Johnson
15	Craig Murdock
16	Neil Cowie
17	Steve Barrow
Coach:
Graeme West

1	Stephen Prescott
2	Joey Hayes
3	Alan Hunte
4	Paul Newlove
5	Anthony Sullivan
6	Tommy Martyn
7	Bobbie Goulding
8	Apollo Perelini
9	Keiron Cunningham
10	Adam Fogerty
11	Derek McVey
12	Chris Morley
13	Karle Hammond
Substitutions:
14	Danny Arnold
15	Simon Booth
16	Andy Haigh
17	Ian Pickavance
Coach:
Shaun McRae

== See also ==
- Super League I
