= 1997 Rugby League Premiership =

1997 Premiership Trophy
- Structure: National knockout championship
- Winners: Wigan Warriors
- Runners-up: St Helens

The 1997 Rugby League Premiership Trophy was the 23rd and final end of season Rugby League Premiership competition and the second in the Super League era. Following this season it was merged into the Super League Championship so one true national champion could be determined.

The winners were Wigan Warriors.

== Preliminary round ==
Date	Team one	Team two	Score
05 Sep	Sheffield Eagles	Warrington Wolves	26-16
07 Sep	Halifax Blue Sox	Castleford Tigers	18-23
07 Sep	Salford Reds	Paris St Germain	48-6
08 Sep	Leeds Rhinos	Oldham Bears	42-16

== Qualifying Finals ==
Date	Team one	Team two	Score
12 Sep	St Helens	Salford Reds	26-12
14 Sep	Bradford Bulls	Castleford Tigers	12-25
14 Sep	London Broncos	Sheffield Eagles	16-58
15 Sep	Wigan Warriors	Leeds Rhinos	38-22

== Semi-finals ==
Date	Team one	Team two	Score
19 Sep	St Helens	Castleford Tigers	32-18
21 Sep	Wigan Warriors	Sheffield Eagles	22-10

== Final ==
28 September 1997

Wigan Warriors	33 – 20	St Helens
Tries: Robinson, Radlinski, Farrell, Haughton, Johnson; Goals: Farrell (6); Drop goals: Wright		Tries: Anderson, Hammond, McVey, Newlove; Goals: Long (2)

Old Trafford
Attendance: 33,389
Referee: Stuart Cummings (Widnes)

1	Jason Robinson
2	Danny Ellison
3	Gary Connolly
4	Kris Radlinski
5	Henry Paul
6	Tony Smith
7	Neil Cowie
8	Jon Clarke
9	Lee Hansen
10	Simon Haughton
11	Mick Cassidy
12	Andy Farrell
13	Andy Johnson
Substitutions:
14	Nigel Wright
15	Stephen Holgate
16	Terry O'Connor
17	Gaël Tallec
Coach:
Eric Hughes

1	Tony Stewart
2	Danny Arnold
3	Alan Hunte
4	Paul Newlove
5	Sean Long
6	Anthony Sullivan
7	Karle Hammond
8	Andrew Leathem
9	Keiron Cunningham
10	Julian O'Neill
11	Derek McVey
12	Apollo Perelini
13	Chris Joynt
Substitutions:
14	Simon Booth
15	Chris Morley
16	Ian Pickavance
17	Paul Anderson
Coach:
Shaun McRae

== See also ==
- 1997 Rugby League Divisional Premiership
- Super League II
