= 1997 Challenge Cup =

Rugby league competition

1997 Silk Cut Challenge Cup
- Duration: 8 Rounds
- Highest attendance: 78,022
- Broadcast partners: (United Kingdom) BBC Sport
- Winners: St. Helens
- Runners-up: Bradford Bulls
- Lance Todd Trophy: Tommy Martyn

The 1997 Challenge Cup, known as the Silk Cut Challenge Cup for sponsorship reasons, was the 96th staging of the Challenge Cup, a European rugby league cup competition.

The competition ended with the final on 3 May 1997, which was played at Wembley Stadium.

The trophy was won and successfully defended by St. Helens, who beat Bradford Bulls 32–22 in the final. The Lance Todd Trophy was won by Tommy Martyn.

== First round ==
Date	Team one	Team two	Score
21 Dec	Askam	Thatto Heath	18-23
21 Dec	Barrow Island	Waterhead	18-8
21 Dec	Beverley	Embassy	18-12
21 Dec	Blackbrook	Kells	26-20
21 Dec	Blackpool	Haydock	4-34
21 Dec	Dewsbury Moor	Upton & Frickley	16-0
21 Dec	Dudley Hill	Park Amateurs	44-6
21 Dec	East Leeds	Kingston Comm	29-20
21 Dec	Eastmoor	Worth Village	26-0
21 Dec	Egremont	Folly Lane	32-14
21 Dec	Featherstone Amateurs	West Bowling	10-15
21 Dec	Hemel Hempstead	Leeds University	12-26
21 Dec	Heworth	RL Student Old Boys	24-8
21 Dec	Hull Dockers	Bisons	32-5
21 Dec	Leigh East	Keighley Albion	12-14
21 Dec	Leigh Miners Rangers	Farnworth	23-16
21 Dec	Lock Lane	Stanningley	15-6
21 Dec	Milford	Norland	20-34
21 Dec	Millom*	Higginshaw	Walkover*
21 Dec	Moldgreen*	Durham University	Walkover*
21 Dec	Normanton	Clayton	8-8
21 Dec	Oldham St Annes	Siddal	12-16
21 Dec	Oulton	Ideal ABI	26-4
21 Dec	Ovenden	Hensingham	26-14
21 Dec	Redhill	London Colonials	33-12
21 Dec	Skirlaugh	Queens	21-10
21 Dec	Thornhill	New Earswick	40-14
21 Dec	Walney	Westfield Hotel	34-10
21 Dec	West Hull	East Hull	34-9
21 Dec	Wigan St Patrick's	Simms Cross	27-4
21 Dec	Woolston Rovers	Gateshead P	82-4
21 Dec	York Acorn	Fryston	22-12
28 Dec	Shaw Cross	BRK (Leeds)	2-15
04 Jan	Clayton	Normanton	REPLAY 26-6
09 Jan	Wigan St Judes	Wigan Rose Bridge	14-24
12 Jan	Mayfield	Eccles	14-12
15 Jan	Saddleworth	Ellenborough	36-0

== Second round ==
Date	Team one	Team two	Score
11 Jan	Clayton	Saddleworth	16-2
11 Jan	Hull Dockers	Eastmoor	28-0
11 Jan	Leeds University	Thatto Heath	24-26
11 Jan	Lock Lane	Heworth	18-10
11 Jan	Milford	East Leeds	12-13
11 Jan	Moldgreen	Thornhill	12-6
11 Jan	Oulton	West Bowling	14-10
11 Jan	Ovenden	Barrow Island	18-16
11 Jan	Redhill	Wigan Rose Bridge	24-17
11 Jan	Siddal	Beverley	36-0
11 Jan	Skirlaugh	Leigh Miners Rangers	34-12
11 Jan	Walney	Millom	17-10
11 Jan	West Hull	Haydock	32-0
11 Jan	Wigan St Patrick's	Blackbrook	36-18
11 Jan	Woolston	Keighley Albion	26-6
14 Jan	Dudley Hill	Dewsbury Moor	40-2
18 Jan	BRK (Leeds)	Egremont	39-6
18 Jan	York Acorn	Mayfield	7-20

== Third round ==
Date	Team one	Team two	Score
24 Jan	Dewsbury Rams	West Hull	44-18
25 Jan	Lancashire Lynx	Hull Dockers	24-4
26 Jan	Barrow Braves	Siddal (Halifax)	16-8
26 Jan	Batley Bulldogs	Prescot Panthers	48-12
26 Jan	Carlisle Border Raiders	BRK (Leeds)	34-8
26 Jan	Doncaster Dragons	Oulton (Castleford)	15-14
26 Jan	Featherstone Rovers	Moldgreen (Huddersfield)	48-14
26 Jan	Huddersfield Giants	East Leeds	82-0
26 Jan	Hull Kingston Rovers	Mayfield (Rochdale)	44-4
26 Jan	Hull Sharks	Lock Lane (Castleford)	42-0
26 Jan	Hunslet Hawks	Woolston Rovers (Warrington)	54-6
26 Jan	Keighley Cougars	Redhill (Castleford)	62-4
26 Jan	Leigh Centurions	Wigan St Patrick's	68-10
26 Jan	Rochdale Hornets	Walney Island (Barrow)	30-6
26 Jan	Swinton Lions	Bramley	46-0
26 Jan	Wakefield Trinity	Ovenden (Halifax)	52-0
26 Jan	Whitehaven Warriors	Skirlaugh (East Yorkshire)	12-6
26 Jan	Widnes Vikings	Clayton (Bradford)	56-2
26 Jan	Workington Town	Thatto Heath (St Helens)	86-0
26 Jan	York	Dudley Hill (Bradford)	14-21

== Fourth round ==
Date	Team one	Team two	Score
07 Feb	Dewsbury Rams	Doncaster Dragons	26-15
08 Feb	St Helens	Wigan Warriors	26-12
09 Feb	Batley Bulldogs	Paris St Germain	4-38
09 Feb	Carlisle Border Raiders	Dudley Hill	62-2
09 Feb	Castleford Tigers	Salford Reds	18-36
09 Feb	Featherstone Rovers	Widnes Vikings	14-12
09 Feb	Huddersfield Giants	Hull Sharks	16-16
09 Feb	Hull Kingston Rovers	Halifax Blue Sox	16-20
09 Feb	Hunslet Hawks	Bradford Bulls	10-62
09 Feb	Lancashire Lynx	London Broncos	5-48
09 Feb	Leigh Centurions	Sheffield Eagles	18-62
09 Feb	Oldham	Rochdale Hornets	48-6
09 Feb	Wakefield Trinity	Swinton Lions	9-4
09 Feb	Warrington Wolves	Barrow Braves	66-6
09 Feb	Whitehaven Warriors	Leeds Rhinos	8-48
09 Feb	Workington Town	Keighley Cougars	14-24
12 Feb	Hull Sharks	Huddersfield Giants	24-14

== Fifth round ==
Date	Team one	Team two	Score
22 Feb	Wakefield Trinity	Oldham Bears	14-22
22 Feb	London Broncos	Bradford Bulls	12-34
23 Feb	Warrington Wolves	Sheffield Eagles	31-18
23 Feb	Halifax Blue Sox	Keighley Cougars	8-21
23 Feb	Leeds Rhinos	Dewsbury Rams	48-22
23 Feb	Salford Reds	Paris Saint-Germain	8-4
23 Feb	St Helens	Hull Sharks	54-8
23 Feb	Carlisle Border Raiders	Featherstone Rovers	20-32

== Quarter-finals ==
Date	Team one	Team two	Score
08 Mar	Oldham Bears	Bradford Bulls	12-38
09 Mar	Warrington Wolves	Salford Reds	10-29
09 Mar	Keighley Cougars	St Helens	0-24
09 Mar	Leeds Rhinos	Featherstone Rovers	32-12

== Semi-finals ==
Date	Team one	Team two	Score
22 Mar	St Helens	Salford Reds	50-20
29 Mar	Bradford Bulls	Leeds Rhinos	24-10

== Final ==
3 May 1997

St. Helens	32 – 22	Bradford Bulls
Tries: Martyn (2), Hammond, Joynt, Sullivan; Goals: Goulding (6)	Report	Tries: Loughlin, Lowes, Peacock, Tomlinson; Goals: McNamara (3)

Wembley Stadium, London
Attendance: 78,022
Referee: Stuart Cummings

=== Teams ===
St Helens: Steve Prescott, Danny Arnold, Andy Haigh, Paul Newlove, Anthony Sullivan, Tommy Martyn, Bobbie Goulding, Apollo Perelini, Keiron Cunningham, Julian O'Neill, Chris Joynt, Derek McVey, Karle Hammond
Subs: Vila Matautia, Chris Morley, Andy Northey, Ian Pickavance Coach: Shaun McRae

Bradford: Stuart Spruce, Abi Ekoku, Danny Peacock, Paul Loughlin, Paul Cook, Graeme Bradley, Robbie Paul, Brian McDermott, James Lowes, Tahi Reihana, Sonny Nickle, Bernard Dwyer, Steve McNamara
Subs: Glen Tomlinson, Paul Medley, Simon Knox, Matt Calland Coach: Matthew Elliott
