= Sean Long =

GB & England international rugby league footballer & coach

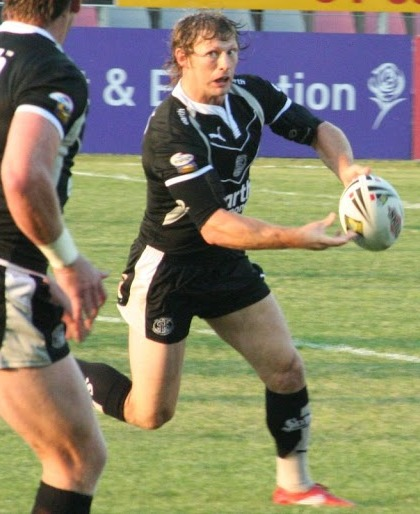

Personal information
- Full name: Sean Bernard Long
- Born: 24 September 1976 (age 50) Wigan, Greater Manchester, England
- Height: 5 ft 9 in (1.75 m)
- Weight: 13 st 5 lb (85 kg)

Playing information

Rugby league
- Position: Scrum-half, Stand-off
Club
Years	Team	Pld	T	G	FG	P
1994–97	Wigan Warriors	12	2	2	0	12
1997	Widnes Vikings	9	2	13	1	35
1997–09	St Helens	343	156	989	23	2625
2010–11	Hull FC	22	6	0	0	24
	Total	386	166	1004	24	2696
Representative
Years	Team	Pld	T	G	FG	P
1997–06	Great Britain	15	4	14	1	45
2000	England	5	2	5	0	18

Rugby union
Club
Years	Team	Pld	T	G	FG	P
2011	Preston Grasshoppers
2017	Orrell R.U.F.C.	0	0	0	0	0
	Total	0	0	0	0	0

Coaching information
Club
Years	Team	Gms	W	D	L	W%
2023	Featherstone Rovers	22	19	0	3	86
2024–25	Oldham RLFC	55	41	2	12	75
	Total	77	60	2	15	78
- Source: As of 20 November 2026

Sean Bernard Long (born 24 September 1976) is an English former professional rugby league footballer and coach, who played in the 1990s and 2000s. He is the current Skills and Transition coach at Premiership Rugby rugby union club Harlequins.

An England and Great Britain international scrum-half, he began his career with Wigan Warriors, and also played for the Widnes Vikings and Hull FC, but is best known for his time playing for St Helens in the Super League with whom he won four Super League championships and five Challenge Cups, as well as numerous individual accolades including the Man of Steel award, and three Lance Todd Trophies, and he is the halfback who has led Great Britain to victory over world champions Australia three times, including the last victory in 2006.

He has also been the head-coach of Featherstone Rovers, and Oldham.

== Early life ==
Between the ages of eleven and thirteen Long attended St Joseph's Catholic Comprehensive School in Horwich but moved to the Deanery High School on Frog Lane in Wigan because the former only played football, not rugby.

== Playing career - rugby league ==
=== Domestic ===
==== Early career ====
After signing from local amateur side, Wigan St Judes, Long started his career at Wigan, making his senior debut in 1994, but a serious knee injury kept him out of action for 18 months. Unhappy with the lack of first team opportunities at Wigan, and with the club becoming frustrated with Long's off-the-field incidents, he was sold to struggling First Division club Widnes in April 1997 as part of an exchange deal for Lee Hansen.

He made his debut for Widnes against Keighley Cougars, and went on to make nine appearances during his two month spell at the club. Although Widnes continued to struggle during his time at the club, Long's individual performances attracted the attention of several Super League clubs. He was signed by St Helens in June 1997 for a fee of £80,000.

==== St Helens ====
Long made his St Helens debut against Cronulla Sharks in the 1997 World Club Championship. At the end of the season, he played in for Saints in the 1997 Premiership final, but lost to former club, Wigan.

Long played for St Helens from the interchange bench, kicking two goals in their 1999 Super League Grand Final victory over Bradford Bulls.

Long twice set the St Helens record for the number of points scored in a Super League season, gaining 284 points in 1999 and 352 points in 2000.

Having won the 1999 Championship, St Helens contested in the 2000 World Club Challenge against National Rugby League Premiers the Melbourne Storm, with Long playing at scrum half back and kicking a goal in the loss. Long played for St Helens at scrum half and kicked four goals in their 2000 Super League Grand Final victory over Wigan Warriors and was named as Man of Steel in 2000.

As Super League V champions, St Helens played against 2000 NRL Premiers Brisbane Broncos in the 2001 World Club Challenge. Long played at scrum half, scoring a try, three goals and a field goal in Saints' victory.

Long played for St Helens at scrum half, scoring a try, a goal and the match-winning drop goal in their 2002 Super League Grand Final victory against the Bradford Bulls.

Having won Super League VI, St Helens contested the 2003 World Club Challenge against 2002 NRL Premiers Sydney Roosters. Long played at stand-off in Saints' 38–0 loss.

In 2004, Long was involved in a betting scandal which resulted in him being suspended for three months.

By 2005, Long had scored 2,000 points for St Helens. During the 2005's Super League X, he sustained a broken cheek bone in a challenge by Wigan Warrior' Terry Newton in an incident that saw Newton receive a 12-match ban, the heaviest for an on-field action in Super League history at the time.

Long played for St Helens at scrum half and scored a try in their 2006 Challenge Cup Final victory over Huddersfield Giants and won the Lance Todd Trophy as man-of-the-match in a Challenge Cup final for a record third time. St Helens reached the 2006 Super League Grand final to be contested against Hull FC and Long played at scrum half in Saints' 26–4 victory.

As 2006 Super League champions, St Helens faced 2006 NRL Premiers Brisbane Broncos in the 2007 World Club Challenge. Long captained Saints from scrum half in their 18–14 victory. St Helens in 2007 took all honours apart from the Super League title when they were beaten by Leeds at Old Trafford in the Grand Final. In 2007 Long received a testimonial match for St Helens against Leigh. Former St Helens players returned for the game, including Chris Joynt, Tommy Martyn and Paul Newlove. St Helens won the game 40–10.

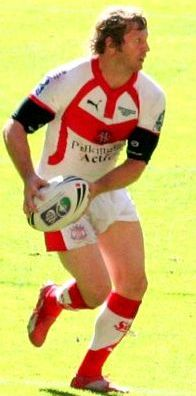
Long playing for Saints in 2007

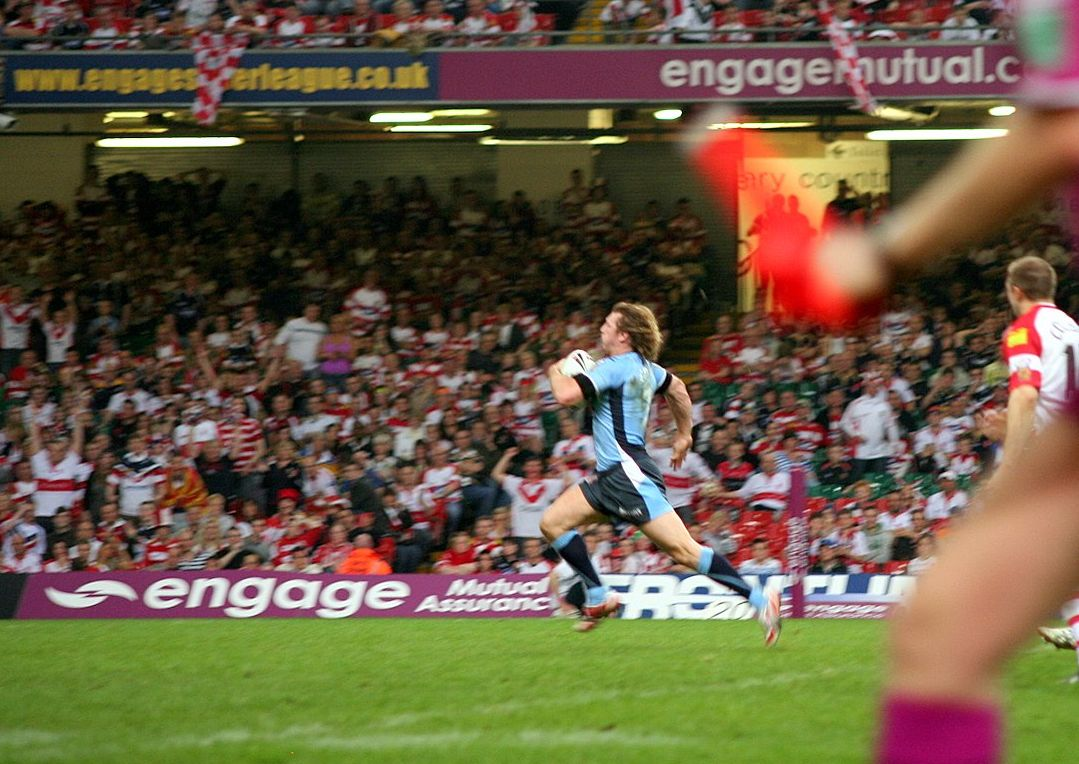
Long scoring a try against Wigan in 2008

He played in 2008's Super League XIII Grand Final defeat by Leeds.

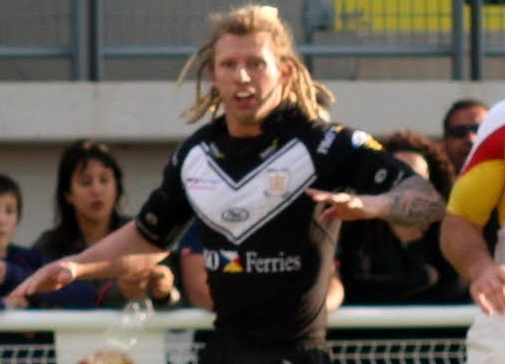
Long playing for Hull F.C. in 2010

He played in the 2009 Super League Grand Final defeat by the Leeds Rhinos at Old Trafford.

==== Hull FC ====
On 1 June 2009 it was announced that Sean had signed a two-year contract with Hull F.C. for the 2010 and 2011 seasons, leaving St Helens after 12 seasons. Also in 2009 an Autobiography, Longy: Booze, Brawls, Sex and Scandal was published. Long kicked his 1,000th goal for St. Helens on 22 February 2009 in a game against Huddersfield.

Long announced his retirement from playing rugby league on the morning of 10 August 2011.

=== International ===
In the 1997 post season, Long was selected to play for Great Britain from the interchange bench in two matches of the Super League Test series against Australia.

He led the charge in the Lions tour of New Zealand in 1999 with a win against New Zealand Maori 22-12, he scored the first two tries and set the next two up for teammates James Lowes and Anthony Sullivan.

In 2004, Long served a three-month ban for his part in the 2004 rugby league betting scandal. Despite this, Long was selected in the Great Britain team to compete in the end of season 2004 Rugby League Tri-Nations tournament. In the final against Australia he played at scrum half in the Lions' 44–4 loss.

Following the 2006 season, Long was selected for Great Britain in the Tri nations. Long played in the first game between Great Britain and Australia, which resulted in Great Britain's first victory in Sydney in 18 years, with a score of 23–12. However, on 13 November 2006, Long returned home from the Tri-Nations tour, with 'personal reasons' cited as the reason by Great Britain coach Brian Noble.

Long officially retired from international football in April 2007, wishing to concentrate on his club career.

=== Rugby union ===
On 1 November 2011 it was announced he had signed a playing contract with rugby union club Preston Grasshoppers in SSE National League 2 North.

In 2017, he joined rugby union side Orrell.

== Coaching career ==
=== Salford ===
Following his retirement as a player, Long began a coaching career, and began an assistant coaching job with Salford.

=== Samoa ===
In 2013, Sean Long was appointed assistant coach of Samoa's 2013 Rugby League World Cup campaign. In 2014 Long reprised his role as Samoa played in the Four Nations. Sean Long was appointed assistant coach for Samoa for the 2017 Rugby League World Cup.

=== St Helens ===
In November 2014, Long left Salford and took up the assistant coach role at St. Helens following former teammate Keiron Cunningham's appointment as head coach from 2015 onwards.

Long to the right of head coach Justin Holbrook in the St Helens coaches box at Anfield in May 2019

=== Harlequins (rugby union) ===
He was assistant coach of Harlequins after leaving St Helens.

=== Leeds Rhinos ===
On 26 October 2020, Long was confirmed as the assistant coach at Leeds marking his return to rugby league.

=== France ===
On 29 March 2021, Long was named as assistant coach for France as they prepared for the 2021 Rugby League World Cup, alongside his responsibilities at Leeds Rhinos.

=== Featherstone Rovers ===
On 5 October 2022, Long was appointed as head coach of RFL Championship side Featherstone. On 7 August 2023, Long was dismissed by Featherstone as head coach. The club were sitting eight points clear at the top of the table when the decision was made.

=== Oldham ===
On 25 October 2023 he was appointed head coach of Oldham RLFC on a 3-year deal Longy won his first league title for Oldham in the 2024 RFL League One Season

On 11 November 2025 his departure from the club was announced.
