= 1995–96 Regal Trophy =

- Structure: National knockout championship
- Teams: 42
- Winners: Wigan
- Runners-up: St. Helens

The 1995–96 Regal Trophy was a British rugby league knockout tournament. It was the 25th and final season that the competition was held, and was the seventh staging of the competition since it was renamed the Regal Trophy.

The last final was won by Wigan, who beat local rivals St. Helens 25-16 at the McAlpine Stadium in Huddersfield. The attendance was 17,590.

== Background ==
This season saw a reduction in the number of entrants, the number decreasing to forty-two.

The inclusion of two French clubs continued, but the number of invitations to the top junior clubs was reduced by six from eleven last season, to just five this season.

The ten first round winners added to the twenty-two clubs given byes, gave a total of entrants into the second round of thirty-two. There were no drawn matches during this season's competition

== Competition and results ==
=== Round 1 ===
Involved 10 matches and 20 clubs with 22 byes

Game No	Fixture Date	Home team	Score	Away team	Venue	Att	Rec	Notes	Ref
1	Sat 30 Sep 1995	Leigh	16-19	AS Saint Estève	Hilton Park	1543		1	
2	Sat 30 Sep 1995	York	24-22	SM Pia XIII	Ryedale Stadium	531		2	
3	Sun 1 Oct 1995	Barrow	29-11	Park Amateurs	Craven Park	520		3	
4	Sun 1 Oct 1995	Bramley	20-17	Woolston Rovers	Clarence Field, Kirkstall	350		4, 5	
5	Sun 1 Oct 1995	Carlisle	38-10	Doncaster Dragons	Gifford Park	435		6	
6	Sun 1 Oct 1995	Chorley Chieftains	92-0	Nottingham City	Victory Park	425			
7	Sun 1 Oct 1995	Highfield	48-18	Hemel Hempstead	Valerie Park, Prescott	220		7	
8	Sun 1 Oct 1995	Hull Kingston Rovers	72-6	Blackpool Gladiators	Craven Park (2)	1087			
9	Sun 1 Oct 1995	Hunslet Hawks	34-24	Ellenborough Rangers	Elland Road	247		8	
10	Sun 1 Oct 1995	Swinton	44-20	West Hull	Gigg Lane	500		9	

=== Round 2 ===
Involved 16 matches and 32 clubs. The 10 winners of the first round were joined by the 11 Championship clubs and 11 First Division clubs in the second round.

Game No	Fixture Date	Home team	Score	Away team	Venue	Att	Rec	Notes	Ref
1	Sat 11 Nov 1995	Keighley Cougars	14–42	St. Helens	Cougar Park	3,737			
2	Sat 11 Nov 1995	Workington Town	30–14	AS Saint Estève	Derwent Park	1,376		1	
3	Sun 12 Nov 1995	Batley	21–14	Wakefield Trinity	Mount Pleasant	1,522			
4	Sun 12 Nov 1995	Bradford Bulls	22–0	Sheffield Eagles	Odsal	3,353			
5	Sun 12 Nov 1995	Bramley	4–22	Hunslet Hawks	Clarence Field	650		5	
6	Sun 12 Nov 1995	Carlisle	19–18	Castleford	Gifford Park	850			
7	Sun 12 Nov 1995	Chorley Chieftains	10–68	Warrington	Victory Park	1,236			
8	Sun 12 Nov 1995	Dewsbury	17–6	Barrow	Crown Flatt	662			
9	Sun 12 Nov 1995	Halifax	20–18	Swinton	Thrum Hall	2,994			
10	Sun 12 Nov 1995	Huddersfield	22–21	Featherstone Rovers	Alfred McAlpine Stadium	2,337			
11	Sun 12 Nov 1995	Hull F.C.	56–18	York	Boulevard	2,411			
12	Sun 12 Nov 1995	Hull Kingston Rovers	10–14	Rochdale Hornets	Craven Park	1,548			
13	Sun 12 Nov 1995	Leeds	46–22	Salford	Headingley	7,589			
14	Sun 12 Nov 1995	London Broncos	82–0	Highfield	Barnet Copthall	512			
15	Sun 12 Nov 1995	Widnes	32–8	Oldham Bears	Naughton Park	3,472			
16	Sun 12 Nov 1995	Wigan	68–26	Whitehaven	Central Park	6,133			

=== Round 3 ===
Involved 8 matches and 16 clubs

Game No	Fixture Date	Home team	Score	Away team	Venue	Att	Rec	Notes	Ref
1	Sat 25 Nov 1995	London Broncos	18-22	Halifax	Barnet Copthall	800			
2	Sun 26 Nov 1995	Batley	22-35	Warrington	Mount Pleasant	1,754			
3	Sun 26 Nov 1995	Dewsbury	14-26	Rochdale Hornets	Crown Flatt	927			
4	Sun 26 Nov 1995	Huddersfield	0-32	Wigan	Alfred McAlpine Stadium	6,026			
5	Sun 26 Nov 1995	Hull F.C.	26-38	St. Helens	Boulevard	4,180		10	
6	Sun 26 Nov 1995	Hunslet Hawks	17-22	Carlisle	South Leeds Stadium	1,355			
7	Sun 26 Nov 1995	Leeds	42-28	Bradford Bulls	Headingley	10,093			
8	Sun 26 Nov 1995	Workington Town	8-32	Widnes	Derwent Park	2,500			

=== Quarter-finals ===
Wigan won their tie against Widnes after extra time.

Game No	Fixture Date	Home team	Score	Away team	Venue	Att	Notes
1	Sat 9 Dec 1995	Widnes	23–28	Wigan	Naughton Park	3,771	
2	Sun 10 Dec 1995	Leeds	44–22	Carlisle	Headingley	5,130	
3	Sun 10 Dec 1995	St. Helens	46–18	Halifax	Knowsley Road	7,419	
4	Sun 10 Dec 1995	Warrington	38–20	Rochdale Hornets	Wilderspool	2,731	

=== Semi-finals ===
The semi-final between St Helens and Warrington was originally scheduled to take place on 30 December 1995, but was postponed due to a frozen pitch. The result in the rescheduled fixture was a record defeat for Warrington.

4 January 1996

St Helens	80 – 0	Warrington

Knowsley Road, St Helens
Attendance: 10,647

6 January 1996

Wigan	38 – 18	Leeds

Central Park, Wigan
Attendance: 10,075

=== Final ===
13 January 1996

Wigan	25 – 16	St Helens
Tries: Paul (2), Tuigamala, Radlinski; Goals: Paul (4); Drop goals: Edwards		Tries: Hayes, Newlove, Cunningham; Goals: Goulding (2)

Alfred McAlpine Stadium, Huddersfield
Attendance: 17,590
Referee: Russell Smith (Castleford)
Player of the Match: Keiron Cunningham

==== Teams and scorers ====
Wigan	No.	St. Helens
Gary Connolly	1	Steve Prescott
Jason Robinson	2	Joey Hayes
Va'aiga Tuigamala	3	Scott Gibbs
Kris Radlinski	4	Paul Newlove
Martin Offiah	5	Anthony Sullivan
Henry Paul	6	Karle Hammond
Shaun Edwards (c)	7	Bobbie Goulding (c)
Neil Cowie	8	Apollo Perelini
Martin Hall	9	Keiron Cunningham
Terry O'Connor	10	Ian Pickavance
Scott Quinnell	11	Chris Joynt
Mick Cassidy	12	Simon Booth
Simon Haughton	13	Dean Busby
Rob Smyth	14	Andy Northey (for Anthony Sullivan 47-mins)
Martin Dermott (for Scott Quinnell 59-mins)	15	Vila Matautia (for Ian Pickavance 25-mins) - Ian Pickavance (returned to replace Dean Busby 58-mins)
Graeme West	Coach	Eric Hughes

=== Prize money ===
As part of the sponsorship deal and funds, the prize money awarded to the competing teams for this season is as follows :-

Finish Position	Cash prize	No. receiving prize	Total cash
Winner	?	1	?
Runner-up	?	1	?
semi-finalist	?	2	?
loser in Rd 3	?	4	?
loser in Rd 2	?	8	?
Loser in Rd 1	?	16	?
Loser in Prelim Round	?	10	?
Grand Total			

=== The road to success ===
This tree excludes any First round fixtures

Second round
Workington Town	30
AS Saint Estève	14
Widnes	32
Oldham Bears	8
Huddersfield	22
Featherstone Rovers	21
Wigan	68
Whitehaven	26
Leeds	46
Salford	22
Bradford Northern	22
Sheffield Eagles	0
Bramley	4
Hunslet Hawks	22
Carlisle	19
Castleford	18
Hull F.C.	56
Ryedale-York	18
Keighley Cougars	14
St. Helens	42
London Crusaders	82
Highfield	0
Halifax	20
Swinton	18
Batley	21
Wakefield Trinity	14
Chorley Borough (2)	10
Warrington	68
Dewsbury	17
Barrow	6
Hull Kingston Rovers	10
Rochdale Hornets	14

Third round
Workington Town	8
Widnes	32
Huddersfield	0
Wigan	32
Leeds	42
Bradford Northern	28
Hunslet Hawks	17
Carlisle	22
Hull F.C.	26
St. Helens	38
London Crusaders	18
Halifax	22
Batley	22
Warrington	35
Dewsbury	14
Rochdale Hornets	26

Fourth round
Widnes	23
Wigan	28
Leeds	44
Carlisle	22
St. Helens	46
Halifax	18
Warrington	38
Rochdale Hornets	20

Semi-finals
Wigan	38
Leeds	18
St. Helens	80
Warrington	0

Final
Wigan	25
St. Helens	16

== Notes and comments ==
1 * AS Saint Estève was a French rugby league team from Perpignan, which in 2000 it merged with nearby neighbours XIII Catalan to form Union Treiziste Catalaneto compete in the Super Leagueas the Catalans Dragons.
2 * Pia are a French League Club playing at Stade Daniel-Ambert
3 * Park Amateurs were a Junior (amateur) club from Halifax
4 * Woolston Rovers are a Junior (amateur) club from Warrington, becoming Warrington Woolston Rovers in 2003 and Warrington Wizards in 2002. the ground is the old Warrington Home Ground of Wilderspool
5 * At the time Bramley were playing their home matches at Clarence Field, Kirkstall, Leeds
6 * Doncaster Dragons were now playing at Belle Vue
7 * Hemel Stags are a semi professional club based in Hemel Hempstead and playing at the Pennine Way stadium (capacity 2000)
8 * Ellenborough Rangers are a Junior (amateur) club from the Ellenborough suburb of Maryport, Cumbria
9 * West Hull are a Junior (amateur) club from Hull
10 * RUGBYLEAGUEproject gives the attendance as 4,180, but Hull official archives gives 4,180 and St Helens official archives give 5,102

== Postscript ==
To date, this was the last season for the John Player sponsored trophy competitions, which had taken place annually since its inauguration in the 1971-72 for a period of 25 seasons.
It was unfortunately such a short period for what was intended to be the "League Cup" and that very few of the professional clubs managed to have their name inscribed on the trophy, or even reach the semi-final stage
The reasons given by the ruling body, the Rugby Football League for the competition's demise, were that it was deemed the trophy was adding to fixture congestion for more successful sides and a clean sweep was needed to herald the "Summer Rugby" image of the game.

=== Records from the John Player trophy competition ===
Record	No.	No.	cup winner	runner-up
In Final	Record			
	Most appearances	9	Wigan	
		8	Widnes	
		7	Warrington	
	Most wins	8	Wigan	
		4	Warrington	
	Most consecutive wins	2	Wigan (3 times)	85-86, 86-87, 88-89, 89-90, 94-95, 95-96
	Most consecutive appearances	4	Wigan	92-93, 93-94, 94-95, 95-96
	Highest Score	40-10	Wigan	v Warrington 1994-95
	Highest Agg score	40-10	as last	
	Lowest Agg score	3-2	Bradford Northern	v Widnes 1974-75
	Widest margin	33-2	Castleford	v Wigan 1993-94
	Biggest Attendance		25,326 - Boothferry Park	Hull Kingston Rovers v Hull F.C. 1981-82
	Smallest Attendance		4,512 - The Willows	Castleford v Blackpool Borough 1976-77
	Highest Receipts		unknown - but possibly	£94,874 - Widnes v Wigan 1988-89
Individual in a final				
	Most tries	3	Ellery Hanley	Wigan v Halifax 1989-90
	Most goals	8	Frano Botica	Wigan v Warrington 1994-95
		6	Derek Whitehead	Warrington v Rochdale Hornets 1973-74
	Most points	16 (8g)	Frano Botica	Wigan v Warrington 1994-95
		15 (6g+1t)	Derek Whitehead	Warrington v Rochdale Hornets 1973-74
In competition				
	Highest Score	142-4	Huddersfield	v Blackpool Gladiators (Sat '26-11-1994)
	Other record scores at the time	138-0	Barrow	v Nottingham City (Thu '24-11-1994)
		2-92	Runcorn Highfield	v Wigan (Sun '13-11-1988)
		90-12	Wakefield Trinity	v Highfield (Tue '27-10-1992)
		82-0	Widnes	v Dewsbury (Sun '30-11-1986)
		2-70	Batley	v Leigh (Sun '24-11-1985)
		64-0	Whitehaven	v Doncaster (Sun '18-11-1984)
		17-68	Carlisle	v Leigh (Sun '20-11-1983)
		67-11	Hull Kingston Rovers	v Oldham (Sun '24-'09-1978)
		9-51	Blackpool Borough	v Leeds (Sun '24-'09-1972)
	Highest score v junior club	88-5	Castleford	v Millom (Sun '16-'09-1973)
	Highest winning margin	138	see above	
	Highest aggregate score	146	see above	
Players Records				
	Most tries	9	Greg Austin	Huddersfield v Blackpool Gladiators 1994-95
		6	Steve Rowan	Barrow v Nottingham City 1994-95
		6	Vincent Gribbin	Whitehaven v Doncaster 1984-85
	Most goals	17	Darren Carter	Barrow v Nottingham City 1994-95
		17	Geoffrey "Sammy" Lloyd	Castleford v Millom 1973-74
	Most points	43 (17g+3t)	Geoffrey "Sammy" Lloyd	Castleford v Millom 1973-74
		42 (17g+2t)	Darren Carter	Barrow v Nottingham City 1994-95

== See also ==
- 1995-96 Rugby Football League season
- Regal Trophy
- Rugby league county cups
