= 2001 World Club Challenge =

Intercontinental rugby league match

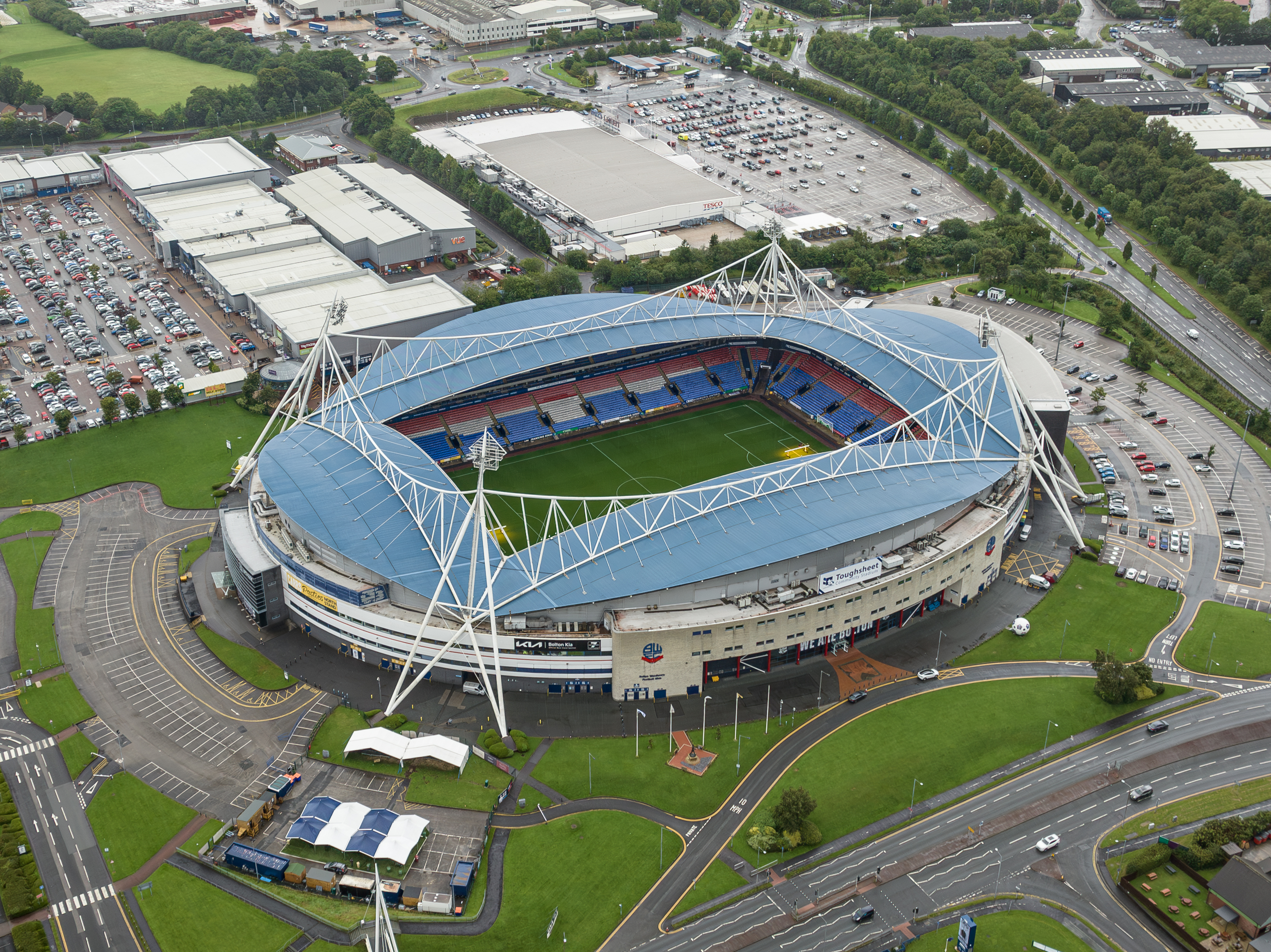
- The Reebok Stadium hosted the match
St. Helens	Brisbane Broncos
(SL)	(NRL)
20	18
	1	2	Total
ST H	6	14	20
BRI	12	6	18
- Date: 26 January 2001
- Stadium: Reebok Stadium
- Location: Bolton, England
- Man of the Match: Sean Long
- Referee: Stuart Cummings (England)
- Attendance: 16,041

Broadcast partners
- Broadcasters: (United Kingdom) Sky Sports
- Commentators: Eddie Hemmings; Mike Stephenson

The 2001 World Club Challenge was contested between Super League V champions, St. Helens and 2000 NRL season premiers, the Brisbane Broncos. The Broncos made the trip to England to play St Helens before the start of the 2001 NRL and Super League seasons and were beaten by two late drop goals (known as a field goal in Australia, but not to be confused with the archaic field goal) from the home side in the final minutes.

== Background ==
=== St Helens ===
The 2000 Super League Grand Final was the conclusive and championship-deciding match of Super League V. It was contested by Wigan Warriors who had finished the regular season in 1s place, and St Helens R.F.C. who had finished in 2nd place, after both teams had played their way through the finals series. St Helens had played in the previous World Club Challenge, suffering a comprehensive defeat at the hands of the Melbourne Storm.

=== Brisbane Broncos ===
The 2000 NRL grand final was the conclusive and premiership-deciding game of the 2000 NRL season. It was contested by the Brisbane Broncos, who had finished the regular season in 1st place, and the Sydney Roosters, who had finished in 2nd place, after both teams played their way through the finals series. Prior to the previous World Club Challenge, the Broncos had contested the three preceding it, winning twice.

== Teams ==
St Helens	Brisbane Broncos

FB	1	Paul Wellens
RW	2	Sean Hoppe
RC	3	Kevin Iro
LC	4	Paul Newlove
LW	5	Anthony Sullivan
SO	20	Tommy Martyn
SH	7	Sean Long
PR	10	David Fairleigh
HK	9	Keiron Cunningham
PR	12	Sonny Nickle
SR	11	Chris Joynt (c)
SR	8	Peter Shiels
LF	13	Paul Sculthorpe
Substitutions:
IC	15	Tim Jonkers
IC	16	Vila Matautia
IC	18	John Stankevitch
IC	19	Anthony Stewart
Coach:
(England) Ian Millward

FB	1	Darren Lockyer
LW	2	Lote Tuqiri
RC	3	Stuart Kelly
LC	4	Michael De Vere
RW	5	Wendell Sailor
FE	6	Shaun Berrigan
HB	7	Scott Prince
PR	8	Shane Webcke
HK	9	Luke Priddis
PR	10	Petero Civoniceva
SR	11	Gorden Tallis (c)
SR	12	Dane Carlaw
LK	13	Phillip Lee
Substitutions:
IC	14	Shane Walker
IC	15	Ashley Harrison
IC	16	Brad Meyers
IC	17	Chris Walker
Coach:
(Australia) Wayne Bennett

== Match details ==
The match was played in wintery conditions on the night of Friday the 26th of January at Reebok Stadium in Bolton, England before a crowd of 16,041. The Broncos players wore black armbands in memory of the club's co-founder Paul "Porky" Morgan who had died from a heart attack the previous day.

26 January 2001

St. Helens	20 – 18	Brisbane Broncos
Tries: Chris Joynt; Sean Long; Paul Sculthorpe; Goals: Sean Long (3); Field Goals: Sean Long (1); Paul Sculthorpe (1)	(Report)	Tries: Shaun Berrigan; Phillip Lee; Brad Meyers; Goals: Michael De Vere (3)

Reebok Stadium, Bolton
Attendance: 16,041
Referee: Stuart Cummings (England)
Player of the Match: Sean Long

=== First half ===
The first try of the match was scored by the Broncos from close to the Saints' try-line when Shaun Berrigan, playing at five-eighth, burrowed over from dummy half. St. Helens answered with a try from their loose forward, Paul Sculthorpe. This was followed by the Brisbane lock, Phillip Lee scoring at the other end. The half-time score was 6 - 12 in favour of the Broncos.

=== Second half ===
Brisbane were again the first to score in the second half through Brad Meyers, giving the visitors a good lead. But a converted try from Saints' scrum-half, Sean Long put the home team back in it at 18 - 12. The scores were then levelled when St. Helens centre, Paul Newlove ran around Wendell Sailor and dashed downfield, passing back inside to his captain, Chris Joynt to score. In the final minutes of the match the Saints managed to wear down the clock without conceding any points as try-scorers Sculthorpe and Long kicked a drop/field goal each, leaving the score at the final siren at 20 - 18.
