= Steve Prescott =

England & Ireland international rugby league footballer

Steve Prescott MBE
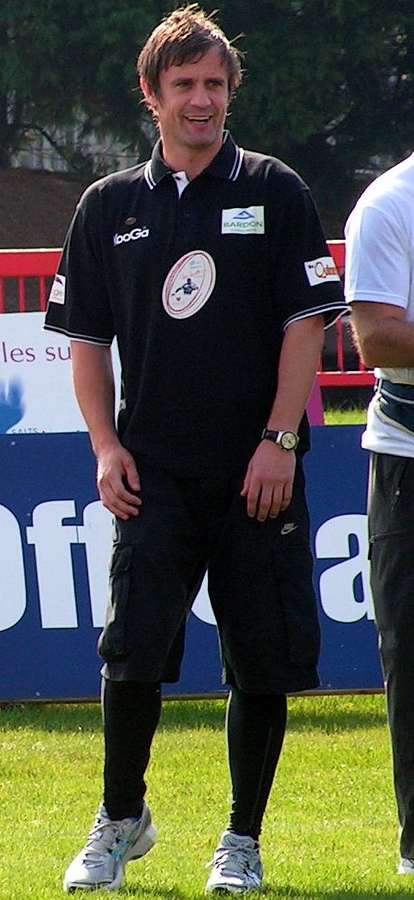

Personal information
- Full name: Stephen Prescott
- Born: 26 December 1973 St Helens, Lancashire, England
- Died: 9 November 2013 (aged 39) Oxford, Oxfordshire, England

Playing information
- Height: 5 ft 10 in (178 cm)
- Weight: 13 st 12 lb (88 kg)
- Position: Fullback
Club
Years	Team	Pld	T	G	FG	P
1993–97	St Helens	117	52	66	0	340
1998–99	Hull Sharks	40	15	63	2	188
2000	Wakefield Trinity Wildcats	25	3	13	0	38
2001–03	Hull FC	67	41	134	1	433
	Total	249	111	276	3	999
Representative
Years	Team	Pld	T	G	FG	P
1996	England	2	3	7	0	26
1998–00	Ireland	8	2	17	0	42
2003	Lancashire	1	0	0	0	0
- Father: Eric Prescott

Stephen Prescott MBE (26 December 1973 – 9 November 2013) was a professional rugby league footballer who played as a fullback during the 1990s and 2000s.

Prescott made his debut for St Helens in 1993, and soon established himself as the club's first choice fullback. He made his senior international début in 1996, playing both games for England in their 1996 European Championship victory, and touring with Great Britain in the Southern Hemisphere. In the same year, he also helped St Helens win the Championship (Super League I) and Challenge Cup for the first time in two decades. He went on to win a second consecutive Challenge Cup with the club in 1997, but was sold to Hull Sharks at the end of the season.

After spending two years at Hull, Prescott joined Wakefield Trinity in 2000, but re-joined Hull a year later after being released by Wakefield Trinity due to the club's financial difficulties. He changed his international allegiance to Ireland, who he represented at the 2000 Rugby League World Cup. He also made one appearance for Lancashire in 2003, but suffered a serious knee injury while playing for the team, which ultimately ended his playing career.

In 2006, Prescott was diagnosed with a rare form of stomach cancer and was given months to live. He set up the Steve Prescott Foundation in 2007, and went on to organise a series of money-raising initiatives. He raised almost half a million pounds for charity through the foundation, and was awarded an MBE in 2009 for his efforts. After a long battle with the disease, he died in 2013, aged 39. A year later, the Rugby Football League renamed the Man of Steel Award in Prescott's honour.

== Early life ==
Steve Prescott was born in St Helens, Lancashire, England on 26 December 1973. He attended De La Salle High School, and he was the son of the rugby league footballer; Eric Prescott. Steve Prescott was introduced to sports from an early age, often playing both football and rugby league on the same weekend. Prescott trialled with several football clubs before opting to focus on rugby league during his teens. He was playing for local amateur side Nutgrove before signing for St Helens in 1992.

== Club career ==
=== St Helens ===
Although he was initially deemed too small to make the grade by St Helens, Prescott secured his future at the club with some impressive performances for the reserve team. He made his début for the first team in September 1993 against Leigh, and scored his first try later that year against Hull. He made 15 appearances and kicked 29 goals during his début season, playing as a winger, or deputising for Dave Lyon at fullback. Although there were still concerns about his size, he established himself as the team's first-choice fullback during the 1994–95 season, with Lyon moving to the centres. On 20 December 1994, he scored his first career hat-trick in a 50–22 victory over Batley in a Regal Trophy third-round replay. A couple of days later, he was rewarded with a new four-year contract. He was a near-ever present throughout the season, appearing 34 times and scoring 20 tries. Steve Prescott played fullback in St. Helens' 16-25 defeat by Wigan in the 1995–96 Regal Trophy Final during the 1995–96 at Alfred McAlpine Stadium, Huddersfield on Saturday 13 January 1996.

Prescott won his first silverware during the inaugural Super League season in 1996, scoring four tries against the Sheffield Eagles in the penultimate game of the season as the club went on to secure its first league championship since 1975. He also played for St. Helens at fullback in the 1996 Challenge Cup Final, scoring two tries in the first seventeen minutes and helping his team to a 40–32 victory against Bradford Bulls. At the start of the following season, Prescott, who was reportedly one of the lowest-paid first team players at the club, was transfer listed at his own request after failing to negotiate an improved contract with the club. He remained in the first team however, and was part of the side that won the 1997 Challenge Cup, once again defeating Bradford Bulls in the Challenge Cup Final. The rest of Prescott's season was interrupted by a number of injuries, and on 25 July 1997 he played what would be his last game for the club in a 70–6 defeat against World Club Challenge opponents Auckland Warriors. In November 1997, he was signed by newly promoted Hull Sharks, along with Alan Hunte and Simon Booth, for a combined transfer fee of £350,000. In his 117 games for the club, he scored 52 tries and kicked 66 goals.

=== Hull F.C. ===
In February 1998, Prescott made his début for Hull F.C. in the Challenge Cup against Whitehaven, and scored his first try for the club in the next round against Ellenborough Rangers. In April 1998, he scored two tries against the Sheffield Eagles in his first Super League match for the club, and became the club's regular goal-kicker later that year. In 1999's Super League IV, Prescott missed two months of the season through injury due to a dislocated elbow. With Hull F.C. struggling near the bottom of the table, and the club being unable to afford his wages, Prescott confirmed he was likely to leave when his contract expired in the winter. Hull F.C. won their last match for the season against the Sheffield Eagles, with Prescott kicking 6-goals, and finished in 13th place – one position above bottom club Huddersfield Giants due to a superior goal difference.

=== Wakefield Trinity Wildcats ===
Prescott signed for Wakefield Trinity Wildcats in 2000, scoring 3 tries in 25 games, but his contract was terminated after one season to ease the club's financial problems. He subsequently rejoined Hull. In April 2001, Prescott was one of 12 former Wakefield Trinity Wildcats players to take the club to an employment tribunal claiming unfair dismissal, and was awarded compensation after the club was found to be in breach of contract.

=== Return to Hull F.C. ===
At the start of the 2003's Super League VIII, Prescott scored a hat trick in the opening Super League fixture against former club the Wakefield Trinity Wildcats. On 26 June 2003, two weeks after signing a new contract with Hull FC, Prescott played his last game for the club, also against the Wakefield Trinity Wildcats, scoring two tries and six goals in a 44–4 win before sustaining a career-ending knee injury a week later while representing Lancashire. Despite only playing 19 games, Prescott scored 216 points – the highest total in his career that he achieved during a single season, and finished as Hull FC's second highest try scorer for the season with 18 tries. He made a total of 107 appearances and scored 56 tries during his two spells at Hull FC.

== Representative career ==
Prescott made his representative début in November 1994, playing at fullback for Great Britain's under-21 side against Australia, who were touring Great Britain and France. Despite Great Britain's heavy 54–10 defeat, Prescott was one of the players singled out for praise, having scored all of the team's points (one try and three goals). In January 1995, he was selected to represent Great Britain in the Rugby League World Sevens. He made a second appearance for the under-21s later that year in a 17–16 loss against France.

He was named in England's 40-man training squad in preparation for the 1995 Rugby League World Cup, but was not included in the final squad. In 1996, Prescott played both games for England in the European Championship, including a man of the match performance against France, scoring two tries and kicking seven goals in the 73–6 win, a then-record margin of victory for England. The 22 points scored by Prescott was also an individual record for most points scored in a single match for England until this was surpassed by Richie Myler in 2009. He also scored a try in the deciding game against Wales, helping the team finish as tournament winners with a 26–12 win. Later that year, he was selected in the squad for the Great Britain tour of Papua New Guinea, Fiji and New Zealand, but did not feature in any Test matches.

In 1998, Prescott changed his international allegiance to Ireland, qualifying under the grandparent rule. He represented Ireland at the 2000 Rugby League World Cup, playing in all four of their games before being knocked out by England in the quarter-final. Prescott scored one try (in the opening game against Samoa) and kicked 17 goals during the tournament.

Prescott also made one appearance for Lancashire against Yorkshire in July 2003 at Odsal Stadium. He suffered a broken kneecap during the game, which was initially expected to keep him out of action for two months. Prescott did not play again for the rest of the year, however, and required a second knee operation after suffering from discomfort when returning to pre-season training ahead of the 2004's Super League IX. In June 2004, after failing to fully recover from the injury, Prescott announced his retirement at the age of 30.

== Personal life ==
In September 2006, Prescott was diagnosed with pseudomyxoma peritonei, a rare form of cancer, and was told that he would not see his two children grow up; he was given months to live. He underwent an emergency operation in Basingstoke Hospital and a tumour was removed from his stomach. In February 2007, a charity boxing event, featuring a bout between Stuart Fielden and Lee Radford, helped raise more than £50,000 in aid of Prescott. In 2013 three weeks before his death he allowed for an experimental surgery under which he had five transplants during 32 hours of operations in an attempt to advance research and help others.

=== Steve Prescott Foundation ===
In August 2007, Prescott set up the Steve Prescott Foundation, which aimed to raise funds for two organisations: Christie Hospital, a leading cancer treatment centre in Europe, and Try Assist, the Rugby Football League's benevolent fund. To raise funds, Prescott went to organise a number of charity boxing tournaments and rugby league games, with a number of Prescott's former teammates taking part. He also took part in a series of challenges, including running in the London Marathon, and cycling from Land's End to John O'Groats while completing the National Three Peaks Challenge en route.

He was appointed Member of the Order of the British Empire (MBE) in the 2010 New Year Honours for services to rugby league and charity.

Shortly after Prescott's death in 2013, the foundation had raised almost £500,000.

=== Death and legacy ===
Steve Prescott died on 9 November 2013, more than seven years after his diagnosis with cancer. In February 2014, it was confirmed that Prescott's former clubs, St Helens and Hull, would compete annually for the "Steve Prescott Cup" in tribute to the player. A petition with over 12,000 signatures was also sent to the Rugby Football League (RFL), calling for the Man of Steel award to be renamed in Prescott's honour. In March 2014, the RFL officially announced that the award would be called the "Steve Prescott Man of Steel" from the 2014 season onwards. The Saints Way Bridge at Langtree Park was also renamed the Steve Prescott Bridge in tribute to him.

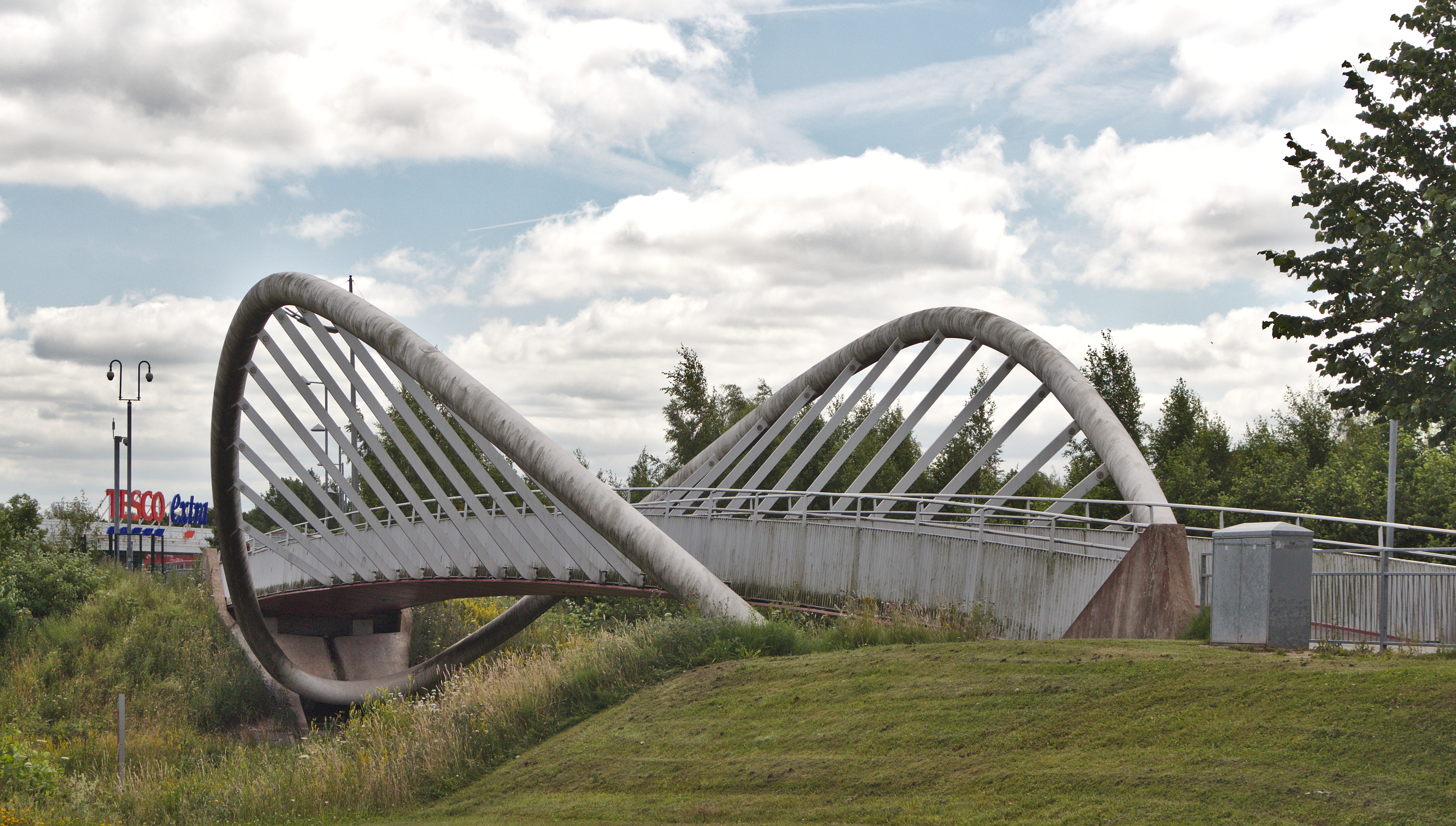
Memorial bridge

== Honours ==
Club

- Super League (1): 1996
- Challenge Cup (2): 1996, 1997

International

- European Rugby League Championship: 1996

Individual

- Rugby League Writers' Association Merit Award, 2009
- Mike Gregory Spirit of Rugby League Award, 2009
- Member of the Order of the British Empire (MBE), 2010
- Honorary doctorate from the University of Hull, 2011

== Statistics ==
Season	Team	Apps	Tries	Goals	DG	Points
1993–94	St. Helens	15	3	29	0	70
1994–95	St. Helens	34	20	5	0	90
1995–96	St. Helens	21	8	15	0	62
1996	St. Helens	27	15	17	0	94
1997	St. Helens	20	6	0	0	24
1998	Hull Sharks	21	8	20	0	72
1999	Hull Sharks	19	7	43	2	116
2000	Wakefield Trinity Wildcats	25	3	13	0	38
2001	Hull F.C.	26	17	55	1	179
2002	Hull F.C.	22	6	7	0	38
2003	Hull F.C.	19	18	72	0	216
Total		249	111	276	3	999
