= Steve Barrow (rugby league) =

English rugby league footballer

Personal information
- Born: 8 December 1975 (age 49)

Playing information
- Position: Prop, Second-row
Club
Years	Team	Pld	T	G	FG	P
1993–95	Widnes	2	0	0	0	0
1995–98	Wigan	12	3	0	0	12
1998(loan)	→ Hull FC	2	0	0	0	0
1999	Hull FC	19	1	0	0	4
2000	London Broncos	2	0	0	0	0
	Total	37	4	0	0	16

Steve Barrow (born 8 December 1975) is a professional rugby league footballer who played in the 1990s and 2000s. He played at club level for Widnes, Wigan, Hull FC, and the London Broncos, as a prop or second-row.

Barrow started his career at Widnes before signing for Wigan in 1995, and played for the club during the inaugural Super League season. He suffered a serious knee injury in January 1997, and failed to make a first team appearance that year. He was loaned out to Hull F.C. in 1998, and signed a permanent deal with Hull FC on a free transfer at the end of the season.
