= Darren Carter (rugby league) =

English rugby league footballer

Personal information
- Full name: Darren Carter
- Born: 8 January 1972 (age 53)

Playing information
- Position: Centre, Stand-off
Club
Years	Team	Pld	T	G	FG	P
1992–96	Workington Town	52	8	7	1	47
1994–95	→ (Loan) Barrow	7	2	26	0	60
1997–2004	Barrow	57	17	6	0	80
	Total	116	27	39	1	187

Darren Carter (born 8 January 1972) is a former professional rugby league footballer who played in the 1990s and 2000s. He played at club level for Workington Town and Barrow as a centre or stand-off.

== Career records ==
Darren Carter holds two records for Barrow. During the Regal Trophy match against Nottingham City on Sunday 27 November 1994 he kicked 17 goals and scored two tries in the 138–0 win. The 17 goals was the club most goals in a game record and with 42 points in total, a club record for most points in a match.
