= Vila Matautia =

Former Samoa & USA international rugby league footballer

Personal information
- Full name: Vila Matautia
- Born: 31 August 1969 (age 56) Samoa

Playing information
- Position: Prop
Club
Years	Team	Pld	T	G	FG	P
1990–95	Doncaster	83	34	0	2	138
1995–01	St Helens	145	24	0	0	96
2002	Leigh Centurions	25	2	0	0	8
	Total	253	60	0	2	242
Representative
Years	Team	Pld	T	G	FG	P
1995	Samoa	2	3	0	0	12
2000	USA
- Source: As of 10 Sep 2020

Vila Matautia is a Samoan former professional rugby league footballer who played in the 1990s and 2000s. He was a Samoan international and played at the 1995 Rugby League World Cup. He also played with St Helens in the Super League, having championship and Challenge Cup Final success with them.

== Background ==
Matautia was born in Samoa.

== Club career ==
Matautia started his career at Doncaster in 1990.

Matautia played for St Helens from the interchange bench in their 1996 Challenge Cup Final victory over Bradford Bulls. Matautia played for St. Helens from the interchange bench in their 1999 Super League Grand Final victory over Bradford Bulls.

Matautia appeared as a substitute (replacing Prop Ian Pickavance on 25-minutes) in St. Helens' 16-25 defeat by Wigan in the 1995–96 Regal Trophy Final during the 1995–96 at Alfred McAlpine Stadium, Huddersfield on Saturday 13 January 1996. As Super League V champions, St. Helens played against 2000 NRL Premiers, the Brisbane Broncos in the 2001 World Club Challenge. Matautia played from the interchange bench in Saints' victory.

Matautia left Saints and joined Leigh Centurions in 2002.

== Representative career ==
Matautia represented Samoa, and played at the 1995 Rugby League World Cup. He also played for the United States rugby league team, trying to get them into the 2000 Rugby League World Cup through his grandmother who was born in Hawaii.

== Assault conviction ==
In December 2017, he assaulted a 15-year-old Rainford High Technology College pupil, inflicting a broken nose, fractured cheek bone and severe bruising. In July 2018, he pleaded guilty and received a seven-month sentence, suspended for 18 months. He received this without hearing victim impact statement and hours before police and victims family attended sentencing. He also received a 3 year restraining order to not contact in any form the victim and his family, which run up to the trial he had tried to do.
