= Andy Northey =

English rugby league & union footballer

Personal information
- Full name: Andrew John Northey
- Born: 17 February 1972 (age 53) St Helens, Lancashire, England

Playing information

Rugby league
- Position: Centre
Club
Years	Team	Pld	T	G	FG	P
1994–97	St Helens	74	21	0	0	84

Rugby union
Club
Years	Team	Pld	T	G	FG	P
1997–00	Northampton Saints
2000	Rotherham Titans
	Total	0	0	0	0	0

Coaching information
Club
Years	Team	Gms	W	D	L	W%
2010	Macclesfield R.U.F.C.

Andrew John Northey (born 17 February 1972) is an English former rugby league and rugby union footballer who played in the 1990s and 2000s. In rugby league he played for St. Helens in the Super League as a second-row before returning to rugby union in 1997, and joining Northampton Saints.

== Career ==
Born in St Helens, Northey started his career as a rugby union player at Waterloo. In December 1994, he switched codes to play for his home town rugby league club St Helens.

Northey played for St. Helens at centre in their 1996 Challenge Cup Final victory over the Bradford Bulls.

Northey appeared as a substitute (replacing centre Anthony Sullivan on 47-minutes) in St. Helens' 16-25 defeat by Wigan in the 1995–96 Regal Trophy Final during the 1995–96 at Alfred McAlpine Stadium, Huddersfield on Saturday 13 January 1996.

At Northampton he was a replacement in the victorious 2000 Heineken Cup Final as they defeated Munster. He joined Rotherham Titans in 2000 for the tail-end of their meteoric rise through the leagues but a knee injury curtailed his playing career. He joined the club's community department as a rugby development officer whilst running the Under-18s, and was offered the chance to take control of first team affairs following the departure of Mike Schmid in 2004.

Northey was a popular figure at Rotherham Titans because of his sharp wit, no-nonsense approach and stories of the 'good old days' of rugby league but was never considered a serious contender to lead the club on a permanent basis. Following the appointment of Andre Bester as Head Coach, Northey was offered the chance to become Assistant Coach but opted to take a similar role at Sedgley Park R.U.F.C.

As of 2010, Northey coached Macclesfield R.U.F.C. in National Division One with Geoff Wappet.

== Personal life ==
Northey is the son of the rugby league centre for St. Helens; Keith Northey, and the grandson of the association footballer (Manchester United (Reserve team), Prescot Cables and Haydock Villa), and coach (St. Helens Town); Bob Northey.
