= 1996 Challenge Cup =

Rugby league competition

1996 Silk Cut Challenge Cup
- Duration: 8 Rounds
- Highest attendance: 78,550
- Broadcast partners: (United Kingdom) BBC Sport
- Winners: St. Helens
- Runners-up: Bradford Bulls
- Lance Todd Trophy: Robbie Paul

The 1996 Challenge Cup was the 95th staging of the Challenge Cup tournament. Known as the Silk Cut Challenge Cup due to sponsorship from Silk Cut, it was the first Challenge Cup of the summer era. The tournament featured 40 teams playing 42 games, the culmination of which was the final at London's Wembley Stadium between Super League I teams St. Helens and Bradford Bulls.

== Prize money ==
The following is a table of prize amounts received by each club depending on which round of the Challenge Cup was reached. No prizes were awarded in the first two rounds of the competition, but amateur clubs who reached the Third Round each received £1,000.

Round	Prize fund
Third round	£3,500
Fourth round	£3,500
Fifth round	£6,000
Quarter Final	£9,000
Semi Final	£12,500
Runners-up	£35,000
Winners	£70,000

== First round ==
Tie no	Home team	Score	Away team
1	Beverley	14–10	Bisons
2	Blackpool Gladiators	14–10	Fryston
3	Dudley Hill	22–29	Thatto Heath
4	Eastmoor	24–6	Upton & Frickley
5	Egremont	12–8	Hensingham
6	Hemel Hempstead	32–8	Worth Village
7	Heworth	34–6	Student RL Old Boys
8	Leigh Miners	32–14	Mysons
9	Lock Lane	36–9	Humberside University
10	Mayfield	22–4	Simms Cross
11	Millom	12–22	Skirlaugh
12	Nottingham City	10–74	West Bowling
13	Oldham St Annes	28–12	Underbank Rangers
14	Saddleworth	43–6	Lowca
15	Thornhill	33–11	Blackbrook
16	West Hull	100–2	Durham University
17	Wigan St Patricks	34–4	Haydock
18	Woolston Rovers	62–4	Sir John Moores Univ

== Second round ==
Tie no	Home team	Score	Away team
1	Eastmoor	17–16	Leigh Miners
2	Lock Lane	22–14	Beverley
3	Oldham St Annes	12–15	Thatto Heath
4	Saddleworth	8–17	Heworth
5	Skirlaugh	19–8	Mayfield
6	Thornhill	44–26	Hemel Hempstead
7	West Hull	35–18	Blackpool Gladiators
8	Wigan St Patricks	6–13	West Bowling
9	Woolston Rovers	20–20	Egremont
Replay	Egremont	13–6	Woolston Rovers

== Third round ==
Tie no	Home team	Score	Away team
1	Barrow Braves	14–0	Doncaster Dragons
2	Bramley	22–18	Heworth
3	Carlisle	36–6	West Bowling
4	Chorley Chieftains	12–27	Thatto Heath
5	Highfield	20–35	West Hull
6	Hull Kingston Rovers	44–12	Eastmoor
7	Hunslet Hawks	30–8	Skirlaugh
8	Leigh Centurions	58–6	Egremont
9	Swinton Lions	52–4	Thornhill
10	York	30–10	Lock Lane

== Fourth round ==
Tie no	Home team	Score	Away team
1	Bradford Bulls	60–18	Batley Bulldogs
2	Carlisle	18–34	Wakefield Trinity
3	Castleford	16–58	St. Helens
4	Dewsbury	12–10	London Broncos
5	Huddersfield	14–35	Sheffield Eagles
6	Hull Sharks	52–18	Hunslet Hawks
7	Hull Kingston Rovers	0–24	Leigh Centurions
8	Keighley Cougars	12–9	Barrow Braves
9	Oldham Bears	4–26	Warrington
10	Rochdale Hornets	54–8	Thatto Heath
11	Salford Reds	35–12	Featherstone Rovers
12	Swinton Lions	22–27	Leeds
13	West Hull	10–6	York
14	Whitehaven	6–18	Halifax
15	Wigan	74–12	Bramley
16	Workington Town	10–17	Widnes

== Fifth round ==
Tie no	Home team	Score	Away team
1	Dewsbury	16–36	Widnes
2	Halifax	24–20	Sheffield Eagles
3	Hull Sharks	42–10	Keighley Cougars
4	Leigh Centurions	12–44	Bradford Bulls
5	Rochdale Hornets	20–58	St. Helens
6	Salford Reds	26–16	Wigan
7	Warrington	10–30	Leeds
8	West Hull	8–40	Wakefield Trinity

== Quarter-final ==
Tie no	Home team	Score	Away team
1	Bradford Bulls	30–18	Wakefield Trinity
2	Halifax	24–35	Leeds
3	Hull Sharks	0–20	Widnes
4	Salford Reds	26–46	St. Helens

== Semi finals ==
9 March 1996

St. Helens	24 – 14	Widnes
Try: Sullivan, Hunte, Hammond, Northey; Goal: Goulding (4)	Report	Try: Spruce, Devereux, D. Hulme; Goal: Tyrer

Central Park, Wigan
Attendance: 13,424
Referee: Russell Smith

23 March 1996

Bradford Bulls	28 – 6	Leeds
Try: Scales (3), Calland, Knox; Goal: Cook (4)	Report	Try: Cummins; Goal: Holroyd

Alfred McAlpine Stadium, Huddersfield
Attendance: 17,139
Referee: Stuart Cummings

== Final ==
27 April 1996

St Helens	40 – 32	Bradford Bulls
Tries: Prescott (2), Arnold (2), Cunningham, Booth, Pickavance, Perelini; Goals: Goulding (4)		Tries: Paul (3), Scales, Dwyer; Goals: Cook (6)

Wembley Stadium, London
Attendance: 78,550
Player of the Match: Robbie Paul

Bradford Bulls	Pos.	St. Helens
Nathan Graham	FB	Stephen Prescott
Paul Cook	WG	Danny Arnold
Matt Calland	CE	Scott Gibbs
Paul Loughlin	CE	Paul Newlove
Jon Scales	WG	Anthony Sullivan
Graeme Bradley	Stand-off	Karle Hammond
Robbie Paul (c)	HB	Bobbie Goulding (c)
Brian McDermott	PR	Apollo Perelini
Bernard Dwyer	HK	Keiron Cunningham
Jon Hamer	PR	Andy Leathem
Jeremy Donougher	SR	Chris Joynt
Sonny Nickle	SR	Simon Booth
Simon Knox	LF	Andy Northey
Karl Fairbank	Int.	Tommy Martyn
Paul Medley	Int.	Ian Pickavance
Jason Donohue	Int.	Vila Matautia
Carlos Hassan	Int.	Alan Hunte
Brian Smith	Coach	Shaun McRae

The 1996 tournament's final featured Super League clubs St. Helens and Bradford Bulls, and was played on Saturday, 27 April at London's Wembley Stadium before a crowd of 78,550. The match was refereed by Stuart Cummings and at half time Bradford led 14-12. Trailing 26-12 from the 53rd to the 57th minute, St Helens overcame this 14-point deficit, the biggest in Challenge Cup final history for a winning team, to prevail by 40-32. This also made it the highest-scoring Challenge Cup final in history.

Bradford's 32 points set a new record for most points scored in a Challenge Cup final-losing team. Bradford's scrum half back, Robbie Paul, became the fourth player ever to achieve what was a Challenge Cup final record of three tries, and was awarded the Lance Todd Trophy for man-of-the-match.

== See also ==
- Super League I
