= Andy Haigh =

English rugby league footballer

Personal information
- Full name: Andrew Haigh
- Born: 3 September 1975 (age 49); Warrington, England

Playing information
- Position: Fullback, Wing, Centre, Second-row, Loose forward
Club
Years	Team	Pld	T	G	FG	P
1993–98	St. Helens	89	27	0	0	108

Andy Haigh (born 3 September 1975) is an English former professional rugby league footballer who played in the 1990s. He played at club level in the Championship First Division and the Super League for St. Helens, as a fullback, wing, centre, second-row or lock.

== Background ==
Haigh was born in Warrington, Cheshire, England. He retired after a knee injury cut a promising career short. He remained in rugby league as a strength and conditioning coach working with Wigan RLFC, Widnes RLFC and Salford RLFC. He now works in the medical devices industry.

== Playing career ==
Andy Haigh played right -centre, i St. Helens' 32-22 victory over the Bradford Bulls in the 1997 Challenge Cup Final at Wembley Stadium, London on Saturday 3 May 1997, in front of a crowd of 78,022. After retiring from Rugby Andy took up a career in strength and conditioning, where he worked for Wigan RLFC, Widnes RLFC and Salford RLFC. Andy left professional sport in 2011 to start a new career in medical devices.
