= Alan Hunte =

English rugby league and rugby union footballer & coach

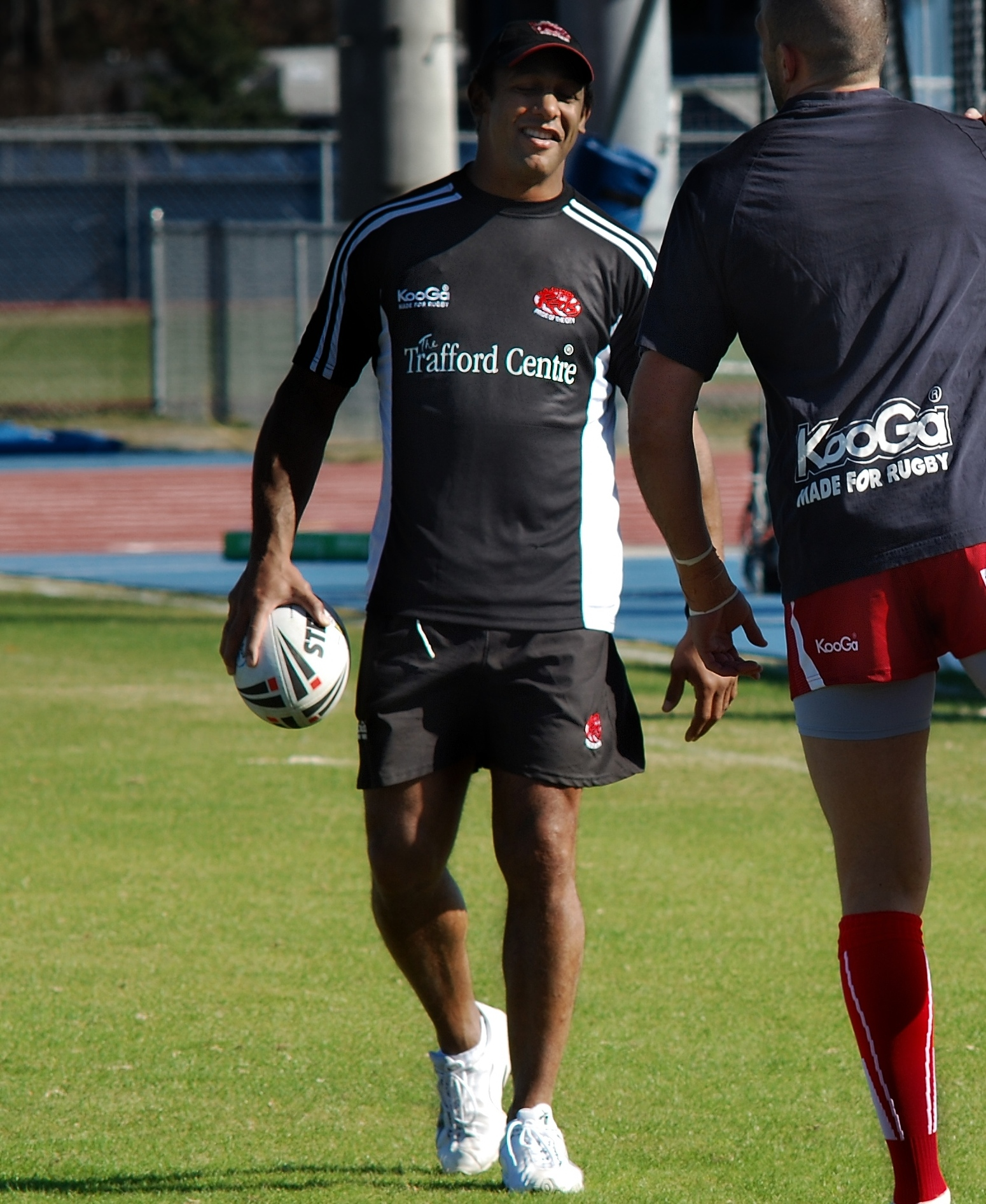

Personal information
- Full name: Alan Christopher Hunte
- Born: 11 July 1970 (age 56) Wakefield, West Riding of Yorkshire, England
- Height: 6 ft 2 in (1.88 m)
- Weight: 14 st 4 lb (91 kg)

Playing information
- Position: Wing, Centre, Fullback
Club
Years	Team	Pld	T	G	FG	P
1989	Wakefield Trinity	2	1	0	0	4
1989–97	St Helens	244	189	0	0	756
1998	Hull Sharks	24	13	0	0	52
1999–01	Warrington Wolves	91	56	0	0	224
2002–03	Salford City Reds	53	41	2	0	168
	Total	414	300	2	0	1204
Representative
Years	Team	Pld	T	G	FG	P
1992–97	Great Britain	15	7	0	0	28
1992	England	1	0	0	0	0

Coaching information
Club
Years	Team	Gms	W	D	L	W%
2013	Salford City Reds	8	2	1	5	25
2027–	St Helens R.F.C. Women	0	0	0	0
	Total	8	2	1	5	25
- Source: As of 4 November 2026

Rugby union career
Senior career
Years	Team	Apps	(Points)
2000	Pontypridd RFC	5	(15)

Alan Christopher Hunte (born 11 July 1970) is an English former professional rugby league and rugby union footballer who played between 1989 and 2003. He played rugby league (RL) at representative level for Great Britain, and at club level for Wakefield Trinity, St Helens, Hull FC, Warrington Wolves and Salford City Reds as a three-quarter, and club level rugby union (RU) for Pontypridd RFC.

He is the current head coach of St Helens R.F.C. Women

== Background ==
Alan Hunte was born in Wakefield, West Riding of Yorkshire, England. His father, Michael, played rugby league for Wakefield Trinity and Dewsbury.

== Playing career ==
Hunte started his rugby league career with Eastmoor, and was selected for the BARLA Young Lions tour of Australia in 1989. He signed amateur forms with Wakefield Trinity during the 1988–89 season, making his debut for the club in January 1989, but chose to sign for St Helens two months later. He scored two tries on his debut for St Helens on 1 March 1989 in a 58–12 win against Oldham. He was not eligible to play for Saints in the 1989 Challenge Cup final due to being cup-tied, having played for Wakefield in an earlier round of the cup.

Hunte played on the wing in St. Helens' 4–5 defeat by Wigan in the 1992 Lancashire Cup Final during the 1992–93 season at Knowsley Road, St. Helens, on Sunday 18 October 1992.

In 1996, Hunte was a substitute in their 1996 Challenge Cup final victory over Bradford Bulls.

Hunte, together with Anthony Sullivan was the 1997 St Helens season's top try scorer.

In November 1997, Hull signed Hunte, along with his St Helens teammates Steve Prescott and Simon Booth, for a combined fee of £350,000.

Hunte later moved to Warrington Wolves and Salford City Reds.

Hunte also switched codes to Rugby Union, joining Pontypridd RFC in 2000 in a blaze of publicity. Hunte's career at Pontypridd was short lived, however, as he struggled to come to grips with the vagaries of the Union code.

=== International career ===
Hunte was selected to go on the 1992 Great Britain Lions tour of Australia and New Zealand, and would play for the Lions in the 1992 Rugby League World Cup final at Wembley in October, though it was his dropped ball which led to débuting Australian centre Steve Renouf scoring the only (and winning) try of the match.

In the 1997 post season, Hunte was selected to play for Great Britain on the wing in all three matches of the Super League Test series against Australia. His speed was shown in the third test when he ran down Aussie speedster Andrew Ettingshausen over a 70m run after giving him a 10m start.

== Coaching career ==
=== Salford Red Devils ===
Hunte worked for 13 years within the coaching setup at Salford Red Devils as Head of Youth Development.

He took over as caretaker head coach in 2013 when Phil Veivers was sacked.

=== St Helens R.F.C. Women ===
On 4 November 2026 it was reported that he had taken the role of head-coach for St Helens R.F.C. Women in the RFL Women's Super League
