= Keiron Cunningham =

Rugby League coach & former GB & Wales international rugby league footballer

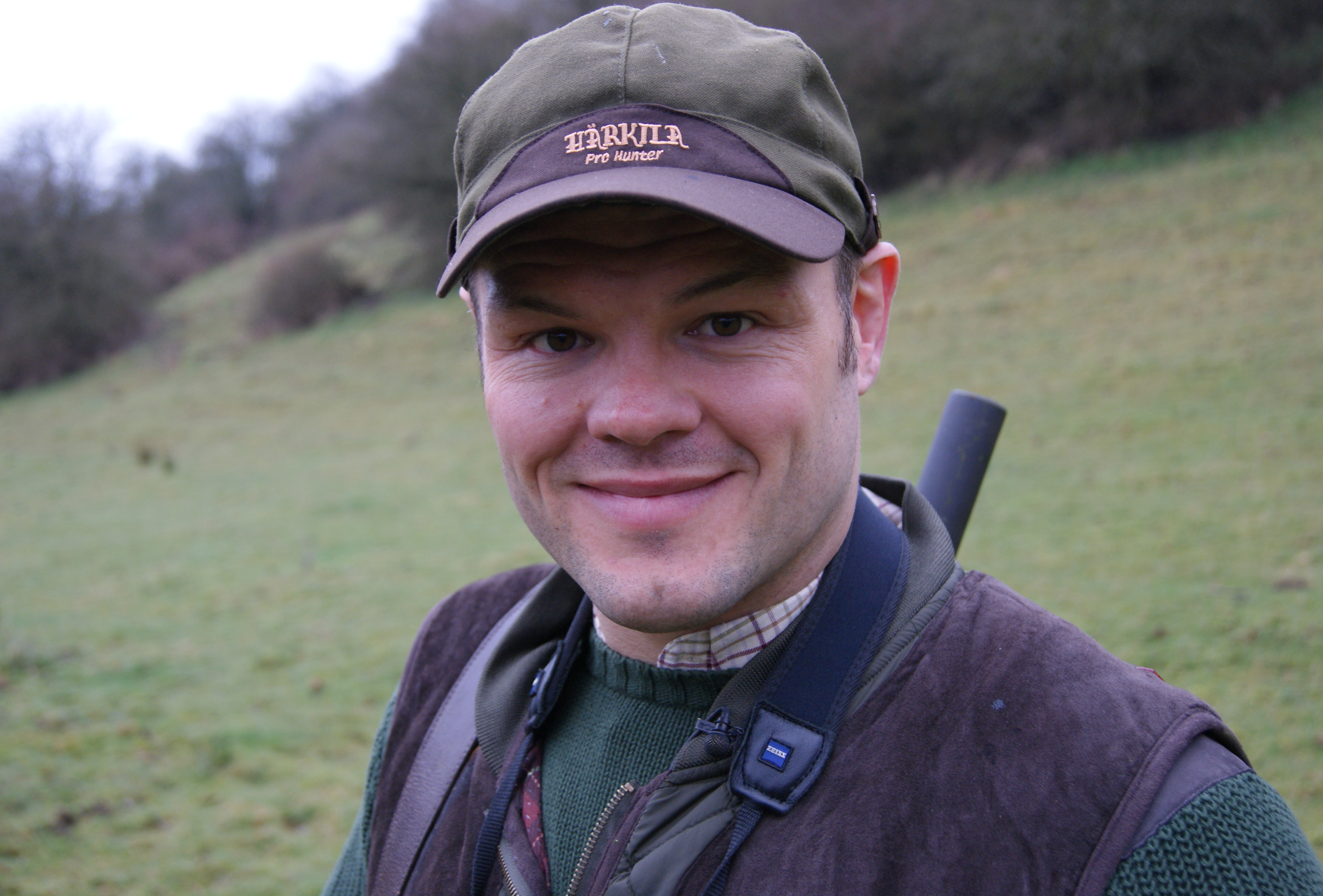

Personal information
- Full name: Keiron Cunningham
- Born: 28 October 1976 (age 49) St Helens, Merseyside, England

Playing information
- Height: 5 ft 9 in (1.76 m)
- Weight: 16 st 12 lb (107 kg)
- Position: Hooker
Club
Years	Team	Pld	T	G	FG	P
1994–10	St Helens	496	175	0	0	700
Representative
Years	Team	Pld	T	G	FG	P
1995–01	Wales	13	7	0	0	28
1996–06	Great Britain	14	0	0	0	0

Coaching information
Club
Years	Team	Gms	W	D	L	W%
2015–17	St Helens	74	43	1	30	58
- Relatives: Eddie Cunningham (brother); Tommy Cunningham (brother)

Keiron Cunningham (born 28 October 1976) is a professional rugby league coach and former player. A Great Britain and Wales international representative hooker, he played his entire professional career at St Helens, making nearly 500 appearances for the club between 1994 and 2010 and winning numerous trophies. He has been frequently cited as being among the best players in the Super League history and is widely regarded to be one of St Helens' greatest players of all time.

The youngest of ten siblings, two of his brothers, Eddie Cunningham and Tommy Cunningham, also played for St Helens. Keiron Cunningham was born five months after his brother Eddie won a Rugby League Challenge Cup winner's medal for St Helens against Widnes.

Following his retirement as a player, Cunningham remained at St Helens as an assistant coach, and was head coach of the club between 2015 and 2017.

== Playing career ==
In 1993, on his 17th birthday, Cunningham signed for his hometown club St Helens from Wigan St Judes. He made his début in the 1994–95 Rugby Football League season, and soon established himself as a world class hooker, renowned for his dynamic running from dummy half and ability to poach tries from short distances. He represented both Great Britain and Wales in international matches, qualifying for Wales because of a Welsh grandfather.

Keiron Cunningham played hooker, and scored a try in St. Helens' 16-25 defeat by Wigan in the 1995–96 Regal Trophy Final during the 1995–96 at Alfred McAlpine Stadium, Huddersfield on Saturday 13 January 1996.

Cunningham played for St Helens at hooker in the 1996 Challenge Cup Final, scoring a try in the second half of the match and helping his team to a 40-32 victory over the Bradford Bulls. At the end of 1996's Super League I, Cunningham was named at hooker in the 1996 Super League Dream Team. Cunningham played for St Helens at hooker in their 1999 Super League Grand Final victory over the Bradford Bulls. Also in 1999 he was the only British player voted into the World XIII.

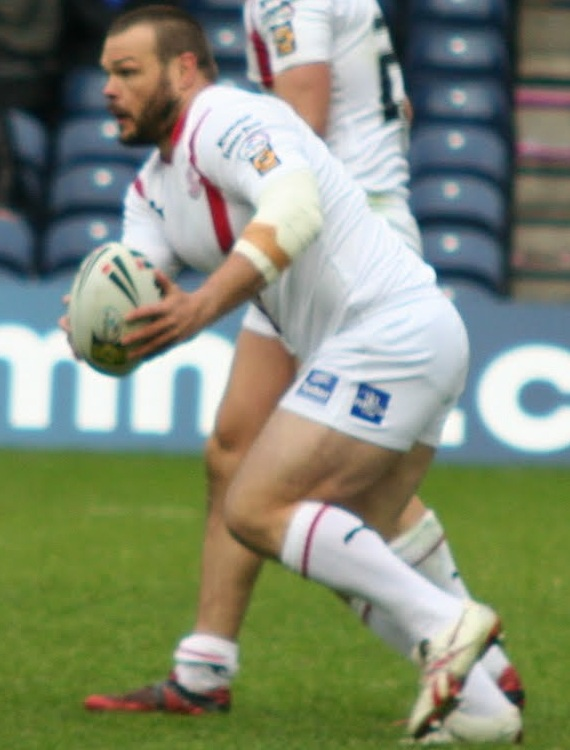
Cunningham playing for St Helens in 2010

Cunningham played for St Helens at hooker in their 2000 Super League Grand Final victory against the Wigan Warriors. As Super League V champions, St Helens played against 2000 NRL Premiers, the Brisbane Broncos in the 2001 World Club Challenge. Cunningham played at hooker in Saints' victory.

Cunningham played for St. Helens at hooker in their 2002 Super League Grand Final victory against the Bradford Bulls.

Over the course of his career, Cunningham rejected offers from the Welsh Rugby Union, England Rugby Union, and from various Australian rugby league clubs, instead choosing to remain with his hometown team. In 2006 Cunningham was named as captain of St. Helens following the persistent injuries and subsequent retirement of Paul Sculthorpe. Cunningham played for St. Helens at hooker in their 2006 Challenge Cup Final victory against the Huddersfield Giants. St Helens reached the 2006 Super League Grand final to be contested against Hull FC, and Cunningham played at hooker, scoring a try in Saints' 26-4 victory. As 2006 Super League champions, St Helens faced 2006 NRL Premiers the Brisbane Broncos in the 2007 World Club Challenge. Cunningham played from the interchange bench in Saints' 18-14 victory.

He played in the 2009 Super League Grand Final defeat by the Leeds Rhinos at Old Trafford.

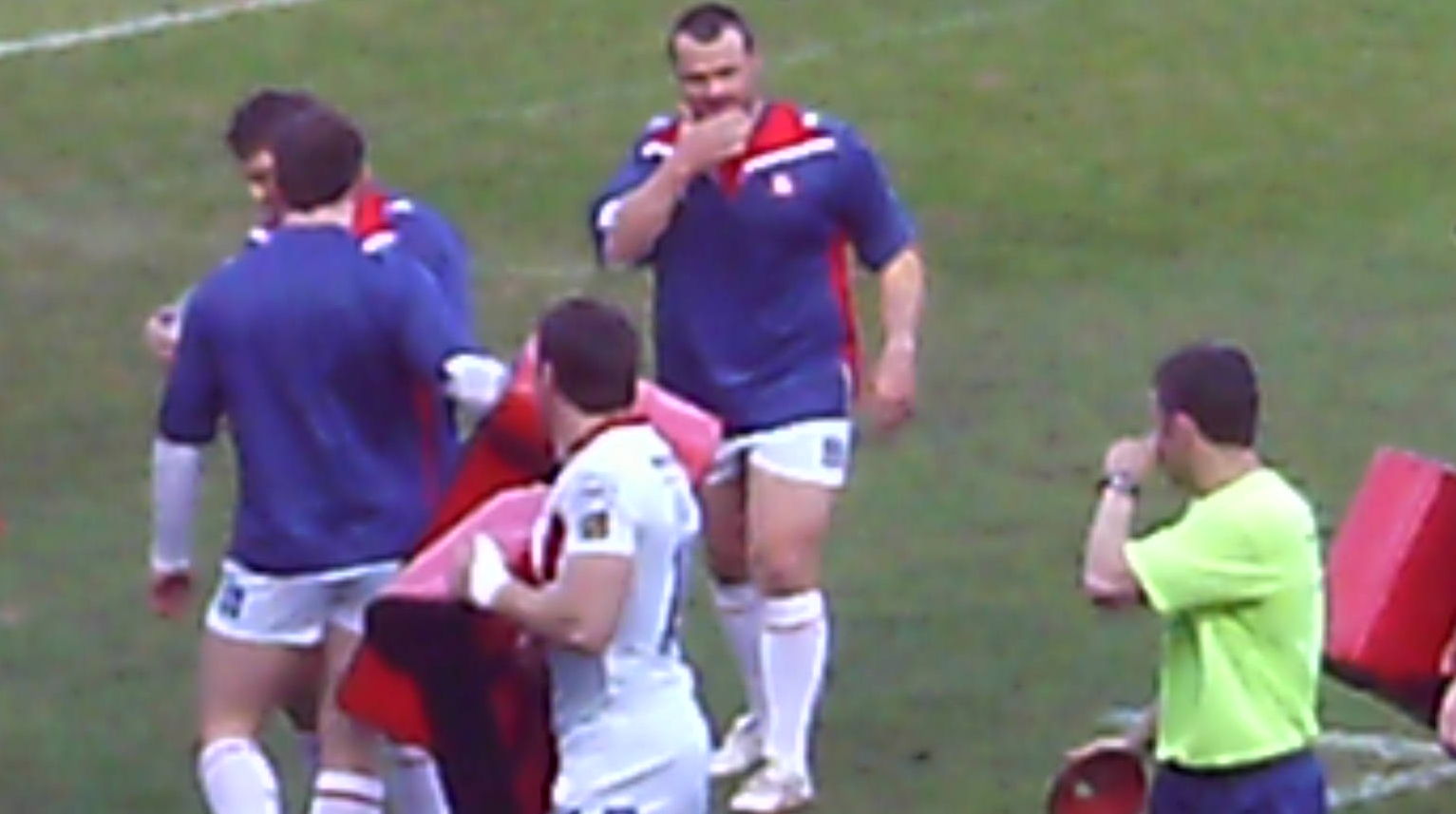
Keiron Cunningham warming up for St Helens in 2010

In 2010, Cunningham announced that he would be retiring from rugby league following the culmination of 2010's Super League XV. 2010 also marked the last year at St Helens' Knowsley Road ground before moving to a new stadium. It was, in fact, Kieron Cunningham who scored the last try ever at the prestigious ground in his penultimate match. However, despite a memorable 2010 play-offs for Cunningham, there was to be no fairytale ending as his last game ended in defeat against arch rivals the Wigan Warriors in the 2010 Super League Grand Final.

He finished his career with 496 appearances for St Helens, scoring 175 tries.

During his career he won five Super League Championships, seven Challenge Cup Winners Medals and two World Club Challenge Winners medals, was named in the Super League Dream Team on six occasions, and in July 2007 Rugby League World magazine ranked him as the greatest player of the Super League era.

Following a supporters' poll featuring the likes of Tom van Vollenhoven and Alex Murphy, Cunningham was chosen to be cast as a bronze statue outside of Langtree Park. The statue was unveiled on Chalon Way opposite the Glass House pub in March 2010 and was relocated to the stadium following its completion in October 2011.

== Coaching career ==
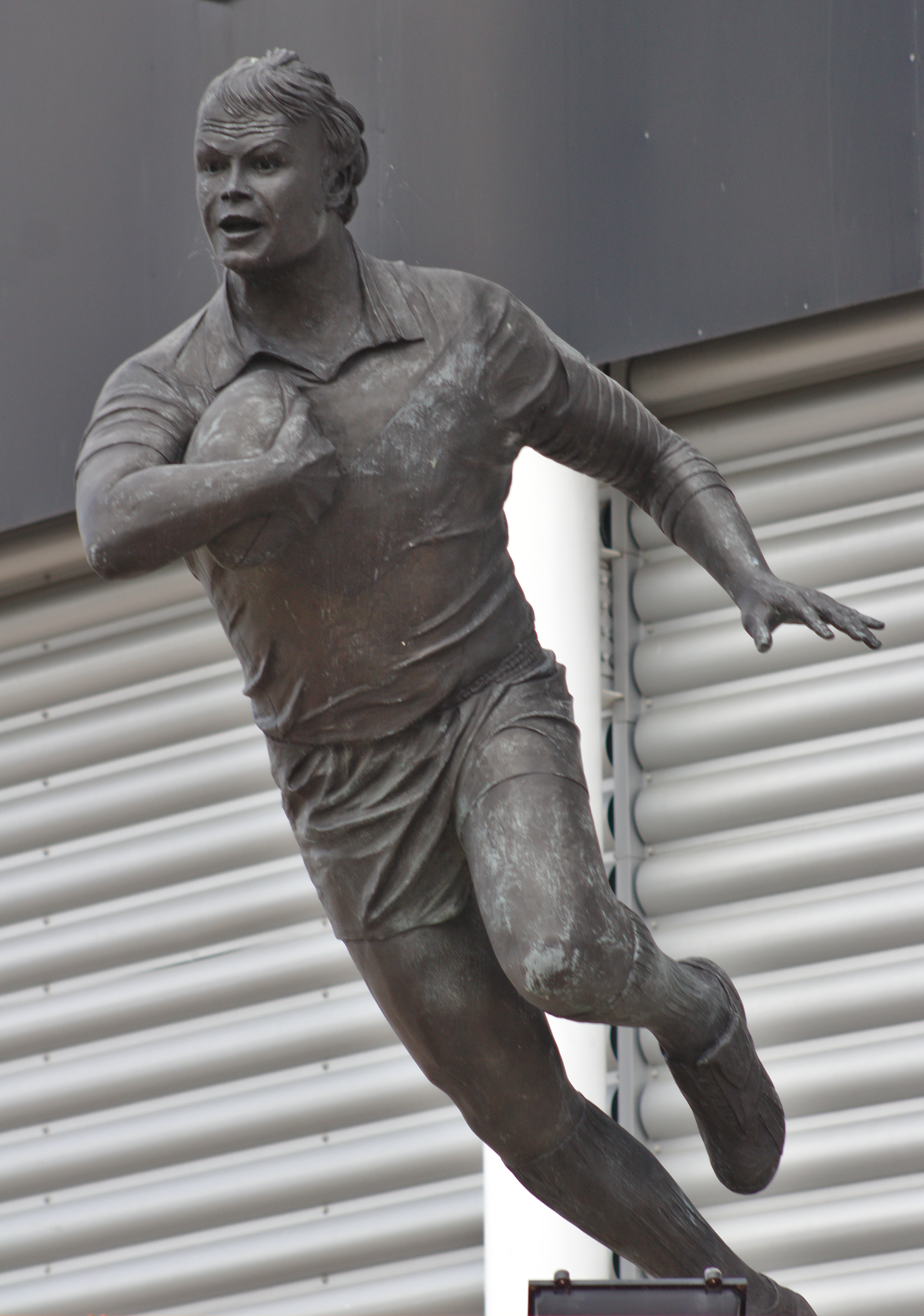
Statue at St Helens stadium

Following his retirement as a player, Cunningham took up an assistant coaching role in the strength and conditioning department at St Helens. After the sacking of Royce Simmons in 2012 he was appointed assistant head coach of St Helens, working alongside temporary head coach Mike Rush.

On Monday 20 October 2014, Cunningham was appointed as head coach of St Helens. He appointed former Saints teammate Sean Long to assist him for his role. On 10 April 2017 it was announced on the BBC North West Today lunchtime bulletin that Cunningham had been sacked after 24 years associated with the club.
