= Andy Leathem =

English rugby league footballer

Personal information
- Full name: Andrew Leathem
- Born: 30 March 1977 (age 48) Trafford, Greater Manchester

Playing information
- Position: Prop
Club
Years	Team	Pld	T	G	FG	P
1994–98	St Helens	45	2	0	0	8
1999	Warrington Wolves	10	0	0	0	0
2000–01	Leigh Centurions	38	1	0	0	4
2002–03	Swinton Lions	38	1	0	0	4
2004–05	Rochdale Hornets	17	0	0	0	0
	Total	148	4	0	0	16

Andrew Leathem (born 30 March 1977) is an English former professional rugby league footballer. He played for St. Helens in the Super League as a prop.

Leathem played for St Helens as a prop in their 1996 Challenge Cup Final victory over Bradford Bulls.
