= Joey Hayes =

GB international rugby league footballer

Personal information
- Full name: Joseph Hayes
- Born: 4 January 1976 (age 50)

Playing information
- Position: Wing
Club
Years	Team	Pld	T	G	FG	P
1995–98	St Helens	44	29	0	0	116
1999	Salford City Reds	11	2	0	0	8
2000–02	Oldham	51	28	0	0	112
	Total	106	59	0	0	236
Representative
Years	Team	Pld	T	G	FG	P
1996	Great Britain	1	0	0	0	0

Joseph Hayes (born 4 January 1976) is a professional rugby league footballer who played in the 1990s and 2000s. He played at representative level for Great Britain, and at club level for St Helens, Salford and Oldham, as a wing.

== Club career ==
Hayes played right wing and scored a try in St. Helens' 16–25 defeat by Wigan in the 1995–96 Regal Trophy Final during the 1995–96 at Alfred McAlpine Stadium, Huddersfield on Saturday 13 January 1996.

After retiring as a player, Hayes re-joined St Helens as a physiotherapist, a role which he held until 2014.

== International honours ==
Joey Hayes won a cap for Great Britain while at St. Helens in 1996 against Papua New Guinea.
