= Shaun McRae =

Australian rugby league coach

Personal information
- Full name: Shaun McRae
- Born: 21 December 1959 (age 66) Australia

Coaching information
Club
Years	Team	Gms	W	D	L	W%
1996–98	St Helens	70	50	2	18	71
1999	Gateshead Thunder	30	19	1	10	63
2000–04	Hull F.C.	87	48	3	36	55
2005–06	South Sydney Rabbitohs	48	12	1	35	25
2007–11	Salford City Reds	18	3	0	15	17
	Total	253	132	7	114	52
Representative
Years	Team	Gms	W	D	L	W%
1995–00	Scotland	5	1	0	4	20
- Source: As of 30 March 2009

Shaun McRae (born 21 December 1959) is a rugby league coach, who is a former director of rugby at Hull F.C. after a spell with the Salford City Reds.

== Career ==
Shaun McRae, nicknamed 'Bomber', was born in 1959 and began his rugby league coaching career as an assistant for the Canberra Raiders in the mid-late 1980s. He was later appointed head coach with St Helens (1996–1998) in the Super League, where he won the Coach of the Year award in 1996. He coached his team to victory in the 1996 Challenge Cup and Super League I championship. His St Helens team also won the 1997 Challenge Cup.

McRae was also the head trainer and unofficial assistant coach to Australian coach Bob Fulton during the 1990 Kangaroo tour of Great Britain and France.

At the end of 1998 McRae moved to the now defunct Gateshead Thunder club. He then joined Hull in October 1999, staying there until 2004.

He returned to Australia and joined the South Sydney Rabbitohs in 2004. He returned to the NRL with a 61.1% success rate in Super League. Under McRae South Sydney finished the 2005 NRL season level on 23 premiership points with 2004 premiers the Canterbury Bulldogs. He was replaced at the South Sydney Rabbitohs by Jason Taylor after the 2006 season with a final winning success rate of exactly 25%.

The 2006 season was seen as a transitional phase for the club, with the loss of senior players such as Bryan Fletcher, Ashley Harrison and Scott Logan, however with the club getting the wooden spoon for the third time in five seasons, he was asked to make way for outgoing Parramatta Eels coach Jason Taylor, who had been hired to replace McRae's previous assistant, Arthur Kitinas.

He moved upstairs to the position of director of rugby at the South Sydney Rabbitohs. However, in late 2006 it emerged that he would be leaving his new role, feeling that he still had much to offer as a head coach.

McRae has worked on Sky Sports with Eddie Hemmings and Mike 'Stevo' Stephenson. In early 2007 he was installed as the favourite to succeed Brian Noble to become the full-time coach of Great Britain but the job went to Tony Smith.

McRae then took over from Karl Harrison at the Salford City Reds on 11 June 2007.

In 2008 after failing to save the Reds from relegation from the Super League, McRae led the Salford side to triple success in the National League, winning the Northern Rail Cup, the League Leaders Trophy and the Grand Final and saw his team gain a licence for re-admittance to the Super League for 2009.

Shaun McRae has been off with an undisclosed illness for most of the 2011 season and the club had announced that he will not be extending his contract after it finishes at the end of the current season. Shaun has since agreed to terminate employment, in a mutual agreement with the club. The Salford City Reds are now looking for a new head coach to take them forward in the new stadium in the 2012 season.

As of September 2011, he has returned to Hull FC as director of rugby after agreeing terms with Hull FC owner Adam Pearson. McRae's arrival was followed by the unveiling of new head coach Peter Gentle (formerly assistant-coach of the Wests Tigers), who took over from Richard Agar.

Shaun McRae was involved in bringing in a number of new signings for the 2012 season, including; Andy Lynch (Bradford Bulls), Brett Seymour (New Zealand Warriors), Wade McKinnon (Wests Tigers), Aaron Heremaia (New Zealand Warriors), Eamon O'Carroll (Wigan Warriors), Martin Aspinwall (Castleford Tigers), Tony Martin (Crusaders) and Jamie Ellis (Leigh Centurions).
