= Ian Pickavance =

Ireland international rugby league footballer

Personal information
- Full name: Ian Pickavance
- Born: 20 September 1968 (age 57) St Helens, Merseyside, England

Playing information
- Position: Second-row, Prop
Club
Years	Team	Pld	T	G	FG	P
1989–93	Swinton RLFC	94	24	0	0	96
1993–98	St Helens	156	24	0	1	97
1998–99	Huddersfield Giants	19	0	0	0	0
1999(loan)	→ Hull FC	6	2	0	0	8
2000	Swinton Lions		4	0	0	16
	Total	275	54	0	1	217
Representative
Years	Team	Pld	T	G	FG	P
1998	Ireland	1	0	0	0	0

Ian Pickavance (born 20 September 1968) is a former professional rugby league footballer who played in the 1990s as a second-row or prop. He started his career at Swinton, and went on play for St Helens, Huddersfield Giants and Hull FC in the Super League.

== Background ==
Pickavance was born in St. Helens, Lancashire, England.

== Career ==
=== Club career ===
After a successful trial, Pickavance was signed by Swinton in February 1989. He joined St Helens in 1993.

Pickavance played at prop (replaced by substitute Vila Matautia on 25-minutes) in St Helens' 16–25 defeat by Wigan in the 1995–96 Regal Trophy Final during the 1995–96 season at Alfred McAlpine Stadium, Huddersfield on Saturday 13 January 1996.

Pickavance played for St Helens from the interchange bench in the 1996 Challenge Cup Final, scoring a try in the second half and helping his team to a 40–32 victory over Bradford Bulls.

=== International ===
Pickavance made one appearance at second-row for Ireland in the 22–24 defeat to France on 4 Nov 1998 in the 1998 European Tri-nations Championship.

== Personal life ==
Ian Pickavance's father, Joe Pickavance, played rugby league for Warrington in the 1960s. His grandfather, also named Joe, served as chairman at St Helens.
