= Chris Joynt =

Former GB, England & Ireland international rugby league footballer

Personal information
- Born: 7 December 1971 (age 53); Wigan, Lancashire, England

Playing information
- Height: 6 ft 0 in (1.83 m)
- Weight: 15 st 2 lb (96 kg)
- Position: Prop, Second-row, Loose forward
Club
Years	Team	Pld	T	G	FG	P
1989–92	Oldham	28	10	0	0	40
1992–04	St Helens	382	121	0	0	484
1995	Newcastle Knights	7	1	0	0	4
	Total	417	132	0	0	528
Representative
Years	Team	Pld	T	G	FG	P
1993–02	Great Britain	25	2	0	0	8
1992–96	England	6	2	0	0	8
2000	Ireland	4	1	0	0	4
2001–02	Lancashire	2	0	0	0	0

Chris Joynt (born 7 December 1971) is a former professional rugby league footballer who played in the 1990s and 2000s. A Great Britain international representative prop, second-row and loose forward, he played his club football with St Helens, with whom he won numerous titles, as well as Oldham and a stint in Australia with the Newcastle Knights. He lifted many trophies throughout a glittering Knowsley Road career, including consecutive Super League championships in 1999 and 2000.

== Background ==
Born on 7 December 1971, Joynt grew up in Beech Hill, Wigan, Lancashire. He attended St John Fisher Catholic High School. He played junior rugby league for Wigan St Judes before joining Wigan St Patricks at the age of 14.

After leaving school, and prior to becoming a full-time professional in rugby league, Joynt worked as a plasterer.

== Playing career ==
=== 1990s ===
Joynt signed with Oldham in April 1989, and made his first team debut a year later, in April 1990. In 1991, Joynt spent the English off-season in Australia, playing for NSW Group 20 club, Yenda Blueheelers. After spending two years mostly in the 'A' team, he became a regular in the Oldham first team during the 1991–92 season. He played for the club in the 1991–92 Divisional Premiership final at the end of the season at Old Trafford, but were defeated by Sheffield Eagles.

He was sold to St Helens in September 1992 in exchange for Sean Devine, Paul Jones and a fee of £50,000.

Joynt played at second-row in St Helens 4–5 defeat by Wigan in the 1992–93 Lancashire Cup Final during the 1992–93 season at Knowsley Road, St Helens on Sunday 18 October 1992. Joynt won his first silverware later that season in the 1992–93 Premiership final, with St Helens this time winning 10–4 over Wigan.

Joynt played left-second-row in St Helens' 16–25 defeat by Wigan in the 1995–96 Regal Trophy Final during the 1995–96 at Alfred McAlpine Stadium, Huddersfield on Saturday 13 January 1996.

Joynt played for St Helens at second-row in their 1996 Challenge Cup Final victory over Bradford Bulls. He took over as captain of the club in 1997, and held the position until 2003. Joynt played for St Helens at loose forward in their 1999 Super League Grand Final victory over Bradford Bulls.

=== 2000s ===
Having won the 1999 Championship, St. Helens contested in the 2000 World Club Challenge against National Rugby League Premiers the Melbourne Storm, with Joynt playing at second-row in the loss. Joynt is probably best remembered as the scorer of the Wide to West try in the Super League Final Eliminator in 2000, which won the match for St. Helens. He played at second-row and scored two tries in the subsequent 2000 Super League Grand Final victory over the Wigan Warriors, and being awarded the Harry Sunderland Trophy. As Super League V champions, St. Helens played against 2000 NRL Premiers, the Brisbane Broncos in the 2001 World Club Challenge. Joynt was the captain, played as a second-row and scored a try in St. Helens' victory.

In 2002, Joynt was at the centre of controversy when he seemingly performed a 'voluntary tackle' with seconds remaining in the 2002 Super League Grand Final. St. Helens had just kicked a drop-goal to take a one-point lead in the match, and the penalty from the voluntary tackle would have given the Bradford Bulls a chance to kick at goal and win the match. However, the referee dismissed wild protests from the Bradford Bulls players and the final hooter went, with St. Helens winning 19–18. Having won Super League VI, St. Helens contested the 2003 World Club Challenge against 2002 NRL Premiers, the Sydney Roosters. Joynt captained St. Helens as a second-row in their 0-38 defeat. Joynt relinquished captaincy of St. Helens to Paul Sculthorpe at the end of 2003's Super League VIII, and retired from rugby league following the 2004's Super League IX.

== International career ==
Joynt represented England at the 1995 Rugby League World Cup. He was selected to play for England in the 1995 World Cup Final on the reserve bench but Australia won the match and retained the Cup.

Joynt was a Great Britain international with 25 caps. In the 1997 post season, Joynt was selected to play for Great Britain at second-row in all three matches of the Super League Test series against Australia.

Joynt was eligible to play for Ireland through his Irish grandmother, and represented the team at the 2000 Rugby League World Cup.

Joynt also represented Lancashire in the Origin Series.
