= Apollo Perelini =

Samoan dual-code rugby international footballer

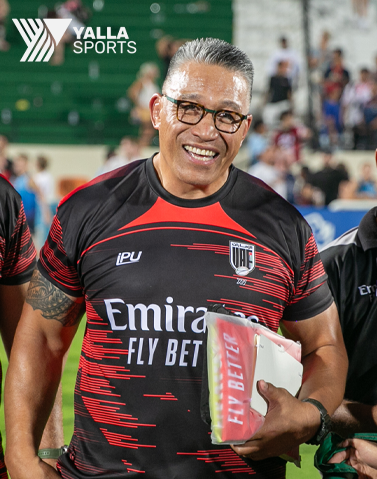

Personal information
- Full name: Afamasaga Apollo Perelini
- Born: 16 July 1969 (age 57) Auckland, New Zealand

Playing information
- Height: 6 ft 2 in (1.88 m)
- Weight: 16 st 10 lb (106 kg)

Rugby league
- Position: Prop, Second-row
Club
Years	Team	Pld	T	G	FG	P
1994–00	St Helens	163+30	44	0	0	176
Representative
Years	Team	Pld	T	G	FG	P
1995	Western Samoa	2	1	0	0	4

Rugby union
Club
Years	Team	Pld	T	G	FG	P
1990–92	Auckland
1992–94	North Harbour	28				14
2000–04	Sale Sharks	30				0
	Total	58	0	0	0	14
Representative
Years	Team	Pld	T	G	FG	P
1991–93	Samoa	9	0			0
1991–93	New Zealand U-21	3
1992	World XV	1

Apollo Perelini (born 16 July 1969) is a former dual-code international rugby union and rugby league footballer who played in the 1990s and 2000s, and has coached in the 2000s and 2010s.

He played representative rugby union (RU) for New Zealand Under-21s, Samoa and World XV and at club level for Auckland, North Harbour and Sale Sharks, and representative rugby league (RL) for Western Samoa and at club level for St Helens, as a prop or second-row.

== Background ==
Perelini was born in Auckland, New Zealand. He was named 'Apollo 11' because he was born on the day that the Apollo space project was launched.

He is a New Zealand national.

== Playing career ==
Perelini played for St. Helens in the Championship and the Super League. He also played for Sale Sharks in the Zurich Championship and North Harbour in New Zealand. Perelini played both prop and second-row in league, and as a back row player in union.

In the 1991 Rugby Union World Cup he played as an open side flanker, in the Samoans' four games (against Scotland, Wales, Argentina and Australia). During the World Cup he gained the nickname of 'Terminator' for his fierce, hard-hitting tackling technique. In 1994 he received an approach from St. Helens to play rugby league in England. At first he rejected it, but finally agreed. In 1995 he played for rugby league for Samoa in the Rugby League World Cup, making him the first Samoan to play in World Cups in both codes.

Perelini played for St Helens at prop in the 1996 Challenge Cup Final, scoring a try in the last minutes and helping his team to a 40–32 victory over the Bradford Bulls. At the end of Super League's first season, Perelini was named at prop in the 1996 Super League Dream Team.

Apollo Perelini played at prop in St. Helens' 16–25 defeat by Wigan in the 1995–96 Regal Trophy Final during the 1995–96 at Alfred McAlpine Stadium, Huddersfield on Saturday 13 January 1996.

Perelini played for St Helens at prop in their 1999 Super League Grand Final victory over Bradford Bulls, having won this they contested in the 2000 World Club Challenge against National Rugby League Premiers the Melbourne Storm, with Perelini playing from the interchange bench in the loss. He also played for St. Helens at prop in their 2000 Super League Grand Final victory over Wigan Warriors.

At the age of 33, after finishing his rugby league playing career, he returned to rugby union to play for the Sale Sharks.

== Post playing ==
After retiring from playing he joined the Sale's Coaching staff. In 2004 he returned to St Helens as the team's Head of Strength and Conditioning and Skills coach. Apollo helped St Helens to four Challenge Cup titles (2004, 2006, 2007 and 2008), four League Leaders titles (2005, 2006, 2007 and 2008), one World Club Championship (2007) and one Grand Final Winners (2006, the year in which St Helens won the BBC sports Team Of The Year)

He now lives in Dubai where he was formerly the Director of Sport at Repton School Dubai, a private school. He currently runs two sporting Academies - Apollo Perelini Rugby Skills Academy (www.aprsa.com) and JETS (a female football academy), at an increasing number of venues around the emirate.

After nearly a decade in charge of the UAE National Rugby team, a position which he started in 2015 for the UAERF, Apollo announced is retirement from the role on 24 November 2025. Apollo spoke about what makes the Rugby Sevens so special and the role that rugby has in the Dubai history in the This Luxury Life podcast show.
