= Simon Booth (rugby league, born 1971) =

English rugby league footballer

Personal information
- Born: 9 December 1971 (age 54) Leigh, England

Playing information
- Position: Second-row
Club
Years	Team	Pld	T	G	FG	P
1990–94	Leigh	67	17	0	0	68
1994–97	St Helens	47	7	0	0	28
1998–99	Hull FC	27	3	0	0	12
2000	Hull KR			0	0
	Total	141	27	0	0	108

Simon Booth (born 9 December 1971) is an English former professional rugby league footballer. He played for St. Helens in the Super League, Hull FC and Hull KR as a second-row.

== Playing career ==
Booth joined St Helens from Leigh in 1994. He played for St Helens at second-row in the 1996 Challenge Cup Final, scoring a try in the second half and helping his team to a 40–32 victory over Bradford Bulls.

Booth played at second-row in St. Helens' 16–25 defeat by Wigan in the 1995–96 Regal Trophy Final during the 1995–96 at Alfred McAlpine Stadium, Huddersfield on Saturday 13 January 1996.
