= 2000 Super League season =

Season in rugby league

Super League V
- League: Super League
- Duration: 28 Rounds
- Teams: 12
- Highest attendance: 17,428; Wigan Warriors vs St. Helens (9 July)
- Lowest attendance: 2,040; London Broncos vs Salford City Reds (12 Aug)
- Total attendance: 1,245,720 (average 7,415)
- Broadcast partners: Sky Sports

2000 Season
- Champions: St. Helens; 3rd Super League title 10th British title
- League Leaders: Wigan Warriors
- Man of Steel: (England) Sean Long
- Top point-scorer: (England) Sean Long (352)
- Top try-scorer(s): (England) Sean Long (England) Tommy Martyn (22)

Tetley's Bitter Super League was the official name for the year 2000's Super League championship season, the 106th season of top-level professional rugby league football in Britain, and the fifth championship run by the Super League. The season culminated in the Grand Final between St Helens R.F.C. and Wigan Warriors, which St Helens won, claiming their second consecutive Championship.

== Table ==
Super League V
Pos	Team	Pld	W	D	L	PF	PA	PD	Pts	Qualification
1	Wigan Warriors (L)	28	24	1	3	960	405	+555	49	Semi Final
2	St Helens (C)	28	23	0	5	988	627	+361	46	Qualifying Semi Final
3	Bradford Bulls	28	20	3	5	1004	408	+596	43	Qualifying Semi Final
4	Leeds Rhinos	28	17	0	11	692	626	+66	34	Elimination Semi Final
5	Castleford Tigers	28	17	0	11	585	571	+14	34	Elimination Semi Final
6	Warrington Wolves	28	13	0	15	735	817	−82	26	
7	Hull F.C.	28	12	1	15	630	681	−51	25	
8	Halifax Blue Sox	28	11	1	16	664	703	−39	23	
9	Salford City Reds	28	10	0	18	542	910	−368	20	
10	Wakefield Trinity Wildcats	28	8	0	20	557	771	−214	16	
11	London Broncos	28	6	0	22	456	770	−314	12	
12	Huddersfield-Sheffield Giants	28	4	0	24	502	1026	−524	8	

Source: Rugby League Project
Rules for classification: 1) Points; 2) Points difference; 3) Number of points scored;
(C) Champions; (L) League Leaders

== Play-offs ==
Qualifying play-off
2	St. Helens	16
3	Bradford Bulls	11
4	Leeds Rhinos	22
5	Castleford Tigers	14

Qualifying semi-final
1	Wigan Warriors	16
St. Helens	54
Elimination semi-final
Bradford Bulls	46
Leeds Rhinos	12

Preliminary final
Wigan Warriors	40
Bradford Bulls	12

Grand Final
St. Helens	29
Wigan Warriors	16

=== Wide to West ===
St Helens, who finished second in the regular season table, hosted Bradford Bulls for the qualifying play-off in week one of the play-offs. One of Super League's most well known tries was scored in the final seconds of the match. Bradford led the game 11–10 into the final minute when, deep in the St Helens half with the match seemingly lost, St Helens were awarded a penalty. This led to St Helens scoring the final points of the match, winning 16–11.

Eddie Hemmings and Mike Stephenson commentated for Sky Sports: The try scored on the second tackle, of the final play, by Chris Joynt, became known as "Wide to West" due to the phrase being used in live commentary by Eddie:

... Here is Long, and Long fancies it. Long fancies it. It's wide to West. It's wide to West. Dwayne West. Inside to Joynt ...

— Eddie Hemmings

== See also ==
- 2000 Super League Grand Final
- 2000 Challenge Cup
