= Danny Arnold (rugby league) =

Scotland international rugby league footballer

Personal information
- Full name: Daniel Andrew Arnold
- Born: 15 April 1977 (age 48) Warrington, Cheshire, England

Playing information
- Position: Fullback, Wing, Centre
Club
Years	Team	Pld	T	G	FG	P
1995–97	St Helens	75	50	1	0	202
1998–00	Huddersfield Giants	65	29	0	0	116
2000	Castleford Tigers	6	0	0	0	0
2001–03	Salford City Reds	58	19	0	0	76
2004	Halifax	14	5	0	0	20
	Total	218	103	1	0	414
Representative
Years	Team	Pld	T	G	FG	P
1998–03	Scotland	9	8	0	0	32
- Source: As of 24 January 2025

Danny Arnold (born 15 April 1977) is a former Scotland international rugby league footballer who played as a fullback, wing or centre in the 1990s and 2000s. He played at club level for St Helens, Huddersfield Giants, Castleford Tigers, Salford City Reds and Halifax. He also participated in the Triple Fitness 8 week shred recently, being partnered up with other local celebrity Angie Pangie.

== Background ==
Arnold was born in Warrington, Cheshire, England.

== Playing career ==
Arnold was signed by St. Helens from amateur club Wigan St Judes on 15 April 1994 and made his début on 10 September 1995 against Workington Town.

One of the most memorable moments of Arnold's career was the hat-trick he scored against Wigan Warriors at Knowsley Road in 1996 where St Helens ran out 42–26 winners. Arnold also played for St Helens on the wing in the 1996 Challenge Cup Final at Wembley Stadium, London, scoring a try in each half of the match, helping his team to a 40–32 victory against Bradford Bulls.

During his time at St Helens, Arnold won two Challenge Cup final winners' medals (1996 and 1997), both finals against Bradford Bulls. He was also part of Saints' Championship winning side of 1996.

Arnold was a Scotland international and played at the 2000 Rugby League World Cup. He made nine appearances for the team between 1998 and 2003, scoring eight tries.

He later played Rugby Union for Aspull RUFC and was set to gain another international cap for the Aspull club in Warsaw, Poland. He took part in a 10s rugby tournament on 4 June for 'A Soldiers Journey'. He masterminded a team of young emus to the final as they won all their matches and went on to win the final in tough conditions.
