= Tommy Martyn =

Former Ireland international rugby league footballer and coach

Personal information
- Full name: Thomas Martyn
- Born: 4 June 1971 (age 55) Leigh, Lancashire, England

Playing information
- Position: Stand-off
Club
Years	Team	Pld	T	G	FG	P
1989–92	Oldham	78	36	85	13	327
1992–03	St Helens	211	127	105	25	743
2003–04	Leigh Centurions	36	26	3	4	114
	Total	325	189	193	42	1184
Representative
Years	Team	Pld	T	G	FG	P
1997–00	Ireland	8	5	8	1	22

Coaching information
Club
Years	Team	Gms	W	D	L	W%
2005	Leigh Centurions
- Source: As of 18 September 2020
- Father: Thomas Martyn
- Relatives: Mick Martyn (uncle); Shay Martyn (son)

Thomas Martyn (born 4 June 1971) is a former Ireland international rugby league footballer who played in the 1980s, 1990s and 2000s, and coached in the 2000s. He played at representative level for Ireland, and at club level for Oldham and St. Helens in the Championship, and, subsequently, Super League and Leigh, as a stand-off. Martyn was known for his very good passing ability and vision. He was able to enjoy a successful rugby career despite undergoing two knee reconstructions.

== Background ==
Martyn was born in Leigh, Lancashire, England.

== Playing career ==
The son of the rugby league footballer Tommy Martyn Sr, and the nephew of the Leigh and Great Britain rugby league footballer Mick Martyn, Martyn played for St Helens from the interchange bench in their 1996 Challenge Cup Final victory over Bradford Bulls. Tommy Martyn Jr. teamed up with Bobbie Goulding in the halves for the 1997 Challenge Cup Final at Wembley. His two tries and try-saving ankle tap tackle on Danny Peacock helped St. Helens to victory and earned him the Lance Todd Trophy as man-of-the-match. Martyn played for St. Helens at scrum half back in their 1999 Super League Grand Final victory over Bradford Bulls.

Having won the 1999 Super League Grand Final, St. Helens contested in the 2000 World Club Challenge against National Rugby League Premiers Melbourne, with Martyn playing as a stand-off half back in the loss. He also played for St. Helens at stand-off half back in their 2000 Super League Grand Final victory over Wigan. In 2000, Martyn's abilities were rewarded when he was selected to represent Ireland in the 2000 Rugby League World Cup where he represented the Wolfhounds at Stand-off defeating Samoa and Scotland in the pool stages and losing to England 26–16 in the quarter finals where he scored a try and kicked 2 goals.

As Super League V champions, St. Helens played against 2000 NRL Premiers, Brisbane in the 2001 World Club Challenge. Martyn played at stand-off half back in St. Helens' victory.

Having won Super League VI, St Helens contested the 2003 World Club Challenge against 2002 NRL Premiers, Sydney Roosters. Martyn played at scrum half back in St. Helens' 38–0 loss.

== Post playing ==
In 2008 he joined the coaching staff of Super League side Warrington, to act as a kicking coach for the academy side.

In December 2009 he joined Widnes in a similar role.

Martyn's son Shay Martyn is a professional rugby league footballer who plays for St Helens in the Super League.

Sporting positions
Preceded by Darren Abram; 2004-2005	Coach Leigh Centurions; 2005	Succeeded by Tony Benson; 2006
