= Anthony Sullivan (rugby) =

Welsh dual-code international rugby footballer

Personal information
- Full name: Anthony Clive Sullivan
- Born: 23 November 1968 (age 56); Kingston upon Hull, East Riding of Yorkshire, England
- Height: 5 ft 10 in (1.77 m)
- Weight: 11 st 11 lb (75 kg)

Playing information

Rugby league
- Position: Wing
Club
Years	Team	Pld	T	G	FG	P
1988–91	Hull Kingston Rovers	11	28	0	0	112
1991–01	St Helens	305	213	5	0	862
	Total	316	241	5	0	974
Representative
Years	Team	Pld	T	G	FG	P
1991	Yorkshire	1	0	0	0	0
1991–99	Great Britain	7	3	0	0	12
1995–00	Wales	18	6	0	0	24

Rugby union
Club
Years	Team	Pld	T	G	FG	P
1998–99	Cardiff RFC	8	6	0	0	30
2001–03	Cardiff RFC	40	14	0	0	70
	Total	48	20	0	0	100
Representative
Years	Team	Pld	T	G	FG	P
2001	Wales	2	0	0	0	0
- Father: Clive Sullivan

Anthony Clive Sullivan (born 23 November 1968) is a Welsh former professional dual-code international rugby league and rugby union footballer who played in the 1980s, 1990s and 2000s. He played representative level rugby league (RL) for Great Britain and Wales, and at club level in the Championship for Hull Kingston Rovers, and in the Championship, and the Super League for St. Helens, as a wing, and representative level rugby union (RU) for Wales, and at club level for Cardiff RFC (two spells), as a wing. He is the son of Wales (RL) international Clive Sullivan.

== Early life ==
Sullivan was born in Hull, East Riding of Yorkshire, England.

== Playing career ==
Sullivan was selected to represent Wales (RL) at the 1995 Rugby League World Cup. He played for St Helens on the wing in their 1996 Challenge Cup Final victory over Bradford Bulls. At the end of Super League's first season, he was named on the wing in the 1996 Super League Dream Team. Together with Alan Hunte he was the 1997 St. Helens' top try scorer. In the 1997 post season, Sullivan was selected to play for Great Britain on the wing in the first match of the Super League Test series against Australia. His usual position was on the wing and he was named in this position in 1998's Super League III Super League Dream Team. Sullivan played for St. Helens on the wing in their 1999 Super League Grand Final victory over Bradford Bulls. He also played for St Helens on the wing in their 2000 Super League Grand Final victory over Wigan. He played for Wales in the 2000 Rugby League World Cup. As Super League V champions, St. Helens played against 2000 NRL Premiers, Brisbane Broncos in the 2001 World Club Challenge. Sullivan played on the wing in Saints' victory. He became a dual-code international when he represented the Wales national rugby union team in 2001.

=== County Cup Final appearances ===
Anthony Sullivan played left wing in St. Helens' 24–14 victory over Rochdale Hornets in the 1991–92 Lancashire Cup Final during the 1991–92 season at Wilderspool Stadium, Warrington, on Sunday 20 October 1991, and played left wing in the 4–5 defeat by Wigan in the 1992–93 Lancashire Cup Final during the 1992–93 season at Knowsley Road, St. Helens, on Sunday 18 October 1992.

=== Regal Trophy Final appearances ===
Anthony Sullivan played left wing in St. Helens' 16–25 defeat by Wigan in the 1995–96 Regal Trophy Final during the 1995–96 at Alfred McAlpine Stadium, Huddersfield on Saturday 13 January 1996.
