= 1995–96 Rugby Football League season =

- League: Centenary Championship
- Duration: 20 Rounds
- Teams: First Division: 11; Second Division: 11; Third Division: 11
- Highest attendance: 19,526; Wigan vs St. Helens (26 December 1995)
- Lowest attendance: 761; London Broncos vs Sheffield Eagles (17 December 1995)
- Broadcast partners: Sky Sports

First Division
- Champions: Wigan (17th title)
- Top point-scorer: (England) Bobbie Goulding (285)
- Top try-scorer(s): (England) Martin Offiah (28) (England) David Plange (28)

New franchise
- Awarded to: Paris Saint-Germain

Second Division
- Champions: Salford Reds

Third Division
- Champions: Hull Kingston Rovers

The 1995–96 Rugby Football League season was the 101st season of rugby league football. Eleven English teams competed from August 1995 until January 1996 for the Stones Bitter Centenary Championship.

The season was kept brief to accommodate the first season of the forthcoming new Super League competition, which would see top-level rugby league in the UK changed to a summer sport.

It was also punctuated by the 1995 World Cup which took place in Britain throughout October. The 1996 Challenge Cup rounds started immediately after the Centenary Championship and the final was played in summer, during Super League I.

== Season summary ==
- Stones Bitter Centenary League champions: Wigan (17th title)
- Silk Cut Challenge Cup: Final played in 1996 summer season.
- Regal Trophy Winners: Wigan (8 - 25-16 v St Helens)
- First Division champions: Salford
- Second Division champions: Hull Kingston Rovers
- Charity Shield winners: Leeds Rhinos

=== Personnel ===
During pre-season, Kath Hetherington of Sheffield was elected as president of the Rugby Football League, succeeding Batley's Ronnie Teeman. Eleven years after becoming the first female member of the league's board of directors, she became the first woman to hold to the presidency.

=== Rules ===
Prior to the signing of the agreement paving the way for the Super League, the RFL had voted in February on a wage cap, limiting player salaries to 50 percent of a team's income.

=== Format ===
The 1995–96 First Division season served as a trial run of sorts for the Super League's inaugural season, which would follow it in the spring of 1996, and its format changes were largely made in anticipation of the latter's launch. Following intense negotiations, it was decided that only the top ten teams from the 1994–95 season, joined by second-tier capital representatives London Broncos (all the projected British entrants in the Super League), would participate in a condensed 1995–96 First Division. There would be no promotion or relegation between it and the inaugural Super League campaign (only the purpose-built Paris team would be added). The lower league clubs were split between a Second and a Third Division, marking a return to the three-tier professional pyramid last used in 1993.

While the new setup was generally considered an appropriate compromise, 1994–95 second-tier champion Keighley and Widnes, a traditionally strong team which had missed the 10-team cutoff after an uncharacteristically poor season, launched legal proceedings after being left out. Hoping for a compromise, Widnes proposed a one-off 1995–96 schedule consisting of a 16-team, dual conference setup where the top five clubs within each conference would advance to the Super League. While some agreed that the plan would make the transitional season more meaningful, it did not come to pass, and their legal challenges were ultimately unsuccessful as well.

=== Highlights ===
The absence of relegation was blamed for a sizeable dip in attendance. Combined with a salary hike resulting from the announcement of the Super League, the season was a financial failure for many clubs, and powerhouse Wigan reported losses of about £450,000 at the end of the shortened campaign.

== Standings ==
=== First Division ===
Pos	Team	Pld	W	D	L	PF	PA	PP	Pts
1	Wigan (C)	20	18	0	2	810	316	256.3	36
2	Leeds	20	14	0	6	552	405	136.3	28
3	Halifax	20	12	1	7	456	463	98.5	25
4	St Helens	20	12	0	8	732	508	144.1	24
5	Sheffield Eagles	20	10	0	10	482	528	91.3	20
6	Castleford	20	9	1	10	448	566	79.2	19
7	Bradford Northern	20	8	0	12	418	476	87.8	16
8	Oldham	20	8	0	12	382	535	71.4	16
9	Warrington	20	7	0	13	443	514	86.2	14
10	London Broncos	20	7	0	13	466	585	79.7	14
11	Workington Town	20	4	0	16	317	610	52.0	8

Rules for classification: 1) Points; 2) Points scored percentage (points scored divided by points conceded)
(C) Champions

=== Second Division ===
Pos	Team	Pld	W	D	L	PF	PA	PP	Pts
1	Salford Reds (C)	20	17	1	2	661	278	237.8	35
2	Keighley Cougars	20	13	2	5	491	255	192.5	28
3	Widnes	20	13	1	6	475	334	142.2	27
4	Hull	20	11	0	9	571	420	136.0	22
5	Featherstone Rovers	20	11	0	9	420	431	97.4	22
6	Whitehaven	20	10	2	8	345	435	79.3	22
7	Wakefield Trinity	20	10	0	10	346	422	82.0	20
8	Rochdale Hornets	20	8	1	11	365	483	75.6	17
9	Huddersfield	20	6	0	14	395	485	81.4	12
10	Batley	20	5	1	14	302	492	61.4	11
11	Dewsbury	20	2	0	18	261	597	43.7	4

Rules for classification: 1) Points; 2) Points scored percentage (points scored divided by points conceded)
(C) Champions

=== Third Division ===
Pos	Team	Pld	W	D	L	PF	PA	PP	Pts
1	Hull Kingston Rovers (C)	20	18	0	2	744	231	322.1	36
2	Leigh Centurions	20	16	0	4	592	335	176.7	32
3	Hunslet Hawks	20	14	0	6	514	315	163.2	28
4	Swinton	20	13	0	7	521	331	157.4	26
5	Carlisle	20	12	0	8	600	309	194.2	24
6	York	20	10	1	9	442	415	106.5	21
7	Bramley	20	9	1	10	400	434	92.2	19
8	Barrow Braves	20	6	0	14	342	488	70.1	12
9	Chorley Chieftains	20	5	1	14	324	608	53.3	11
10	Doncaster Dragons	20	5	0	15	348	646	53.9	10
11	Highfield	20	0	1	19	249	964	25.8	1

Rules for classification: 1) Points; 2) Points scored percentage (points scored divided by points conceded)
(C) Champions

== Statistics ==
The following are the top points scorers in the 1995–96 season.

Most tries

Player	Team	Tries
Martin Offiah	Wigan	28
David Plange	Hull Kingston Rovers	28
Anthony Sullivan	St. Helens	24
Va'aiga Tuigamala	Wigan	22
Jason Robinson	Wigan	21
Simon Ashcroft	Swinton	20
Joey Hayes	St. Helens	18
Jason Viller	Hunslet Hawks	18
Gary Atkins	Hull Kingston Rovers	18
Jason Roach	Swinton	17
Nathan McAvoy	Salford Reds	17

Most goals (including drop goals)

Player	Team	Goals
Bobbie Goulding	St. Helens	135
Mike Fletcher	Hull Kingston Rovers	117
Steve McNamara	Hull F.C.	101
Paul Cook	Bradford Bulls	99
Willie Richardson	Carlisle	96
Steve Blakeley	Salford Reds	93
Andy Farrell	Wigan	92
Martin Pearson	Featherstone Rovers	86
Simon Irving	Keighley Cougars	81
Chris Wilkinson	Leigh Centurions	81

== Sources ==
- 1995–96 Rugby Football League season at rlhalloffame.org.uk
- 1995–96 Rugby Football League season at wigan.rlfans.com
- Great Britain Competitions 1995-1996 at hunterlink.net.au
- Championship 1995/96 at rugbyleagueproject.org
