= St Helens R.F.C. =

English professional rugby league club

St Helens

Club information
- Full name: St Helens Rugby Football Club
- Nickname(s): The Saints; Red V
- Colours: White and red
- Founded: 1873; 153 years ago
- Website: saintsrlfc.com

Current details
- Grounds: Knowsley Road (1890-2010) (17,500); BrewDog Stadium (2012-present) (18,000)
- CEO: Joe Nicholl
- Chairman: Eamonn McManus
- Coach: Kevin Walters
- Captain: Matty Lees
- Competition: Super League
- 2026 Super League Season: 7th

Uniforms
Home colours	Away colours	Third colours

Records
- Championships: 17 (1932, 1953, 1959, 1966, 1970, 1971, 1975, 1996, 1999, 2000, 2002, 2006, 2014, 2019, 2020, 2021, 2022)
- Challenge Cups: 13 (1956, 1961, 1966, 1972, 1976, 1996, 1997, 2001, 2004, 2006, 2007, 2008, 2021)
- World Club Challenges: 3 (2001, 2007, 2023)
- Other honours: 39
- Most capped: 551 – James Roby
- Highest points scorer: 3,413 – Kel Coslett

St Helens R.F.C., commonly known as Saints, is a professional rugby league club in St Helens, Merseyside, England. Founded in 1873, the club is one of the oldest members of the Rugby Football League, and one of the most successful clubs in its history. The club plays their home games at the BrewDog Stadium and currently compete in Super League, the top tier of British rugby league system. Since 1961 the club's home colours have been distinctive white shirts with a prominent red "V" on the chest of the jersey.

St Helens have won the League Championship 17 times, the Challenge Cup 13 times and World Club Challenge on three occasions. Since the foundation of the Super League in 1996, Saints have been the most successful team, winning 10 championships (including 4 in a row between 2019 and 2022), and being runner up a further 5 times (losing to Leeds Rhinos each time between 2007 and 2011), while winning the League Leaders Shield 9 times.

The club have a traditional rivalry with Wigan Warriors as the two most successful clubs in the British game, and close regional rivals. The clubs face each other traditionally on Good Friday. The club also have a local rivalry with the Warrington Wolves and a rivalry with Leeds Rhinos borne out of close competition during the Super League era.

== History ==
=== Early years (1873–1945) ===
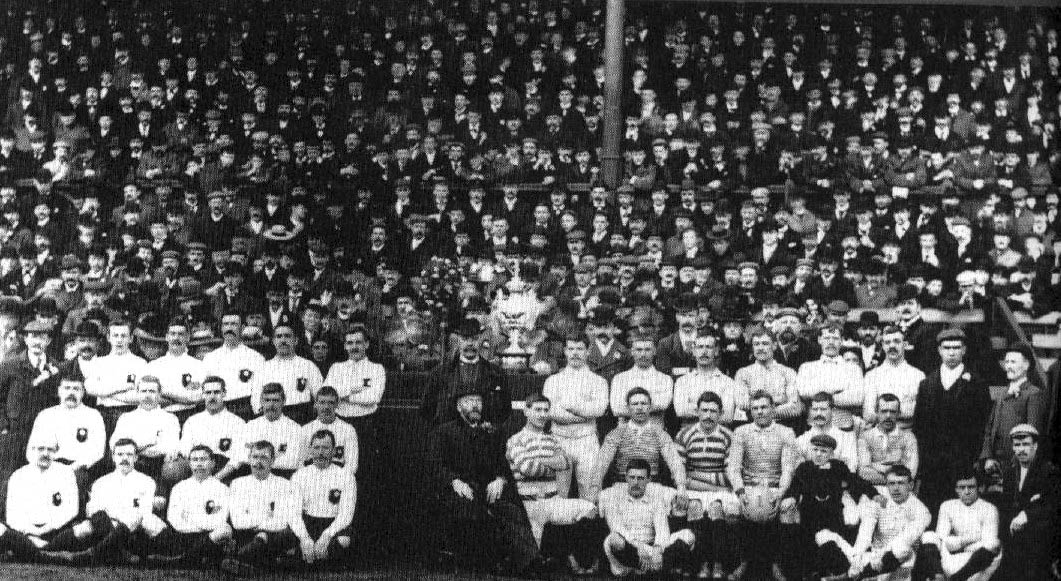
St. Helens pictured in the first ever Challenge Cup Final, 1897: Batley (left) vs St Helens (right)

St Helens are the oldest members of the Rugby Football League. Founded as St Helens Football Club on 19 November 1873 at the Fleece Hotel by William Douglas Herman, they played their first ever match on 31 January 1874 against Liverpool Royal Infirmary. They became known as St Helens Rangers up until the 1880s. The club moved from the City Road Ground in 1890 where they had shared with St Helens Recs when neither were members of the Northern Rugby Football Union. They defeated Manchester Rangers in the first match played at Knowsley Road.

In 1895 the club were one of 22 clubs that resigned from the Rugby Football Union and established the Northern Union. The first match of the new code was an 8–3 win at home to Rochdale Hornets before 3,000 spectators, Bob Doherty scoring St Helens' first try. They played in a vertically striped blue and white jersey—a stark contrast to the well known broad red band which would become the kit for the club later. The club reverted to this kit for one season during the rugby league centenary season in 1995.

The Challenge Cup was launched in 1897 and it was St Helens who contested its first final with Batley, at Headingley, Leeds. The "Gallant Youths" of Batley emerged victorious 10–3, with Dave "Red" Traynor scoring the lone St Helens' try.

St Helens 1897 Challenge Cup Final team

11 Tom Winstanley (Second-row)	12 Tom Reynolds (Second-row)
14 Billy Briers (FL)	13 Peter Dale (Loose forward)	15 Bill Whiteley (FL)
7 Freddie Little (Scrum-half)
6 Richard O'Hara (Stand-off)
4 Jim Barnes (Centre)
3 David Traynor (Centre)
5 Billy Jacques (Wing)	2 Bob Doherty (Wing)
1 Tom Foulkes (Fullback)

Between 1897 and 1901, St Helens were not successful, even generally considered a mid—table side. They finished second to bottom in the 1900–01 Lancashire League season, meaning they did not qualify to compete in the national league the year later. In the 1901–02 season, however, they did finish third in the Lancashire league. In 1902–03, the combined Lancashire and Yorkshire leagues saw St Helens enter for the first time. St Helens were placed in Division 1 but finished next to bottom and suffered relegation. Promotion was gained at the first attempt, only for another poor year to see them finish once again in a relegation position. However the two Divisions became one League to save the club from a second relegation. The Champion fortunes that St Helens fans' greet today were certainly not apparent in this period, with the club finishing fourth to bottom in 1907, third to bottom in 1908, and consistently mid—table between 1909 and 1913.

On 14 June 1913, St Helens Recs joined the Northern Union after defecting from rugby union and association football. The Recs were based individually at the City Road ground, after previously sharing with St Helens, before their move to Knowsley Road, when neither played rugby league. The Recs played their first game on 6 September 1913. St Helens now had two professional rugby league teams. In both sides first year in co—existence, St Helens finished yet again in a disappointing low mid—table finish.

During the First World War, St Helens struggled to compete and failed to complete the full fixture list of the Emergency War League on two occasions, with the club finishing mid—table in the first year of the war, as well as being beaten by 37 points to 3 by Huddersfield in that year's Challenge Cup Final.

The aftermath of the war was still taking its toll on national sport, not merely the club's ability to compete and complete fixtures, on 31 January 1918 'close down' due to a lack of finances following a 22–0 defeat by Widnes. Saints re-open on 25 December 1918 and are beaten 20 points to nil by St Helens Recs in a friendly fixture at City Road. In the shortened 1918–1919 season, St Helens played only nine times. The club's lack of success and disappointing league finishes continued for another seven seasons.

The club defeated town rivals the Recs in the Lancashire County Cup Final by 10 points to 2 in the 1926–27 season. The season after, they were trophyless, finishing tenth in a 28—team league. One year after the Challenge Cup's début at Wembley, St Helens reached the final there where they were defeated by 10 points to 3 by Widnes in 1930. They won their first ever National Championship in the 1931–32 season, defeating Huddersfield 9–5 in the final. This was the same season that they won their second Lancashire League, the first coming in the 1929–30 season. They lost the 1933 Lancashire Cup Final to Warrington, whilst finishing in no competitive position in the league once more. St Helens reached no finals or achieved any more honours during the remainder of the 1930s. Also, what appeared to be building as something of an inter—town derby between the two St Helens clubs was struck down as St Helens Recs played their last game on 29 April 1939, as, due to the economic depression, it was not possible for the town to sustain two teams.

Like during the First World War, the club could not enjoy having a full—time squad during the Second World War and struggled to compete. They did not compete in the National Championship until a 17 team Emergency War League was formed in the 1941–42 season, and did not win any regional honours. They finished bottom of the EWL in seasons 1942–43 and 1943–44 and next-to-bottom in 1944–45.

=== Post-war (1945–1979) ===
The club's fortunes that had seen them be successful so rarely the decade previous did not change in the 1940s. After the commitments of the Second World War, St Helens still found it hard to compete, and the trend of finishing as a mid—table side was once more apparent. The first two years of the 1950s, the last two years of Peter Lyons' reign, also ended trophyless.

The arrival of Jim Sullivan as head coach in 1952 heralded a successful era for St Helens, and helped to establish the club as a respected force in British and eventually world rugby league. Under Sullivan, St Helens reached, and lost, the 1952–53 Challenge Cup final. They didn't have long to wait for trophies as St Helens won the Lancashire Leagues, in 1952–53, The 1953 Championship final against Halifax was held at Manchester City's Maine Road ground; in front of a crowd of over 50,000, Saints won their second Championship 24–14. They also won the 1953 Lancashire Cup, beating Wigan 16–8 at Swinton, the first time the two old rivals had clashed in a major final, Saints.

Sullivan took Saints to their first victory in the Challenge Cup final (against Halifax in 1956), On Saturday 24 November 1956, St Helens inflicted a touring Australia its biggest ever defeat with a 44–2 win.

The following year saw Saints win the 1956-7 Lancashire League 1956–57 and they won it again in 1958–59. Sullivan's second championship came in 1958–59. A second Lancashire County Cup came in 1960–61,

The now synonymous red "vee" of St Helens—still used today—was first seen in the 1961 Challenge Cup Final.

Ex—St Helens captain and prop-forward Alan Prescott took over from Jim Sullivan as head coach in 1959. Perhaps the golden era of the club came in the 1960s, as well as more lately in the Super League era. With a galaxy of stars including Tom van Vollenhoven, Alex Murphy, Dick Huddart, Cliff Watson, Ray French and Vince Karalius, the 1960s was a decade of great success for the Saints. In Prescott's first season as coach he lifted the Lancashire League in the 1959–60 season. During this decade, the recognisable 'red vee' strip first appeared in 1961 for the final against Wigan. St Helens won this epic 12–6, and the kit has since become synonymous with the club. Mick Sullivan joined Saints for £11,000, then a record transfer fee. They won the Lancashire Cup in the 1961–62 season, with a 25–9 success over Swinton (at Central Park, Wigan) seeing yet more silverware come St Helens' way under the management of Prescott. After his departure in 1962, Stan McCormick led the club to retaining the Lancashire Cup in his first year, again beating Swinton; and St Helens made it a quadruplet of Lancashire Cup successes with wins against Leigh in 1964, and once more Swinton in 1965, the latter success under coach Joe Coan. St Helens won the Western Division Championship under McCormick's rule, beating Swinton 10–7. St Helens, under coach Joe Coan, lost the 1964–65 Championship final to Halifax at Station Road, Swinton. The 1965 New Zealand tourists appeared at Knowsley Road on Wednesday 15 September. Saints inflicted a 28–7 defeat on their visitors, their biggest loss of the tour. A League and Cup double was achieved under Coan in the 1965–66 season, whilst they lost the Floodlit Trophy final against Castleford. St Helens were beaten by Wakefield Trinity in the 1967 Rugby Football League Championship Final at Station Road, Swinton on 10 May 1967 by 20 points to 9 in a replay, after a 7–7 draw 4 days earlier. This would be Coan's last year in charge at St Helens after a highly successful period as boss. He was replaced by Cliff Evans.

Evans' first full season in charge at the club saw him win the club's eighth Lancashire Cup in 1968; winning 13–10 against Warrington after a replay. St Helens retained the Lancashire Cup the year later, whilst also winning the Lancashire League for being the highest placed Lancashire side in the National standings, and they also reached the final of the Floodlit Trophy that season, where they were beaten 7–4 by Wigan. The 1969–70 season would be the year that Evans would leave his post, but not without winning a National Championship, beating Leeds in the final after finishing third overall.

The 1970s were also seen as a successful spell for St Helens, as they reached three Challenge Cup finals in the period. Jim Challinor took over from Cliff Evans in 1970, and in his first season, he won the Championship, and reached two finals, the Lancashire Cup and Floodlit Trophy, losing both. In this season, a European Championship—not dissimilar to today's World Club Challenge—was contested between St Helens and French champions St Gaudens. Over a two—legged game, St Helens won 92–11 on aggregate. In their first Challenge Cup Final of the 1970s, they defeated Leeds in 1972 16–13, in addition to winning their first Floodlit Trophy, after losing out in the final three times before, with an 8–2 win over Rochdale. The club reached the Championship final in that season, but were beaten. No success was achieved in seasons 1972–73 and 1973–74, with St Helens finishing third and second in the respective years. This could be a possible reason for Jim Challinor's replacement with Eric Ashton as head coach. In Ashton's first season in charge, St Helens won the Championship, and contested the inaugural Premiership Final, losing 26–11 to Leeds. They repeated their first Challenge Cup success of the 1970s three years after the first against Widnes in 1976 where they were victorious by 20–5 in the famous 'Dads Army' final. They also won the Premiership against Salford, and the Floodlit Trophy against Dewsbury in a successful season. In the same year, St Helens lost to Eastern Suburbs in an unofficial World Club Challenge Final by 25 points to 2. The club won the Premiership in 1977, but, on 13 December 1977, Saints lost 26–11 to Hull Kingston Rovers in the final of the BBC2 Floodlit Trophy. In 1978 Leeds avenged their 1972 loss against St Helens, emerging winners by 14–12. St Helens lost the Floodlit Trophy in the 1978–79 season, going down to Widnes. The 1979–80 season was unsuccessful, with St Helens finishing mid—table. Eric Ashton left the club after this disappointing year.

=== The 1980s, and early to mid-1990s ===
Former club player and Welsh international Kel Coslett took over as coach in June 1980. However, his spell as coach was not nearly as successful as his spell as a player, and St Helens won nothing whilst under Coslett's command, finishing mid-table in both seasons. He held the post for two years before handing over to Billy Benyon. Not in-keeping with several of his predecessors, Benyon did not enjoy any success in his first season as St Helens coach, losing the Lancashire Cup final of that year to Warrington. Nothing was won in the 1983–84 season, but Saints won back the Lancashire Cup, with a 26–18 win at Wigan in the 1984–85 season. They also won the Premiership in the same season with a 36–16 victory over defending champions Hull Kingston Rovers at Elland Road in Leeds. The 1984–85 season saw the arrival (for one season only) of giant Australian international centre Mal Meninga who quickly became a crowd favourite at Knowsley Road. In Benyon's last season as coach, 1985–86, nothing was won.

The arrival of Alex Murphy as coach in 1986 produced some colourful displays from a team that was widely regarded as an entertaining team to watch, but seemed to be constant runners-up. This was illustrated by the defeat by Halifax in the Challenge Cup final at Wembley, 19–18, in 1987. Success was achieved in 1988 when St Helens lifted their one and only John Player Trophy with a 15–14 victory over Leeds in January 1988, at Central Park, Wigan. Neil Holding with the crucial, match-winning drop-goal. They, however, lost to Widnes in the Premiership Final at Old Trafford at the end of the season, further showing this team's ability to get to finals and not be able to compete on the best stage. Nothing was achieved in the next two seasons, including a defeat in the 1989 Challenge Cup Final and Murphy stood down as coach.

Murphy was succeeded by Mike McClennan in February 1990. In his first season, McClennan took St Helens to the 1991 Challenge Cup Final, where they were defeated by 13 points to 8 by Wigan. They won the Lancashire Cup, in the 1991–92 season, beating Rochdale Hornets. They also lost the Premiership Final that season, losing to Wigan. In 1993 the club avenged their defeat by Wigan the season previous to win the Premiership, in the same season that they won the Charity Shield, and lost the Lancashire Cup final. McClennan was head coach until December 1993, when Eric Hughes succeeded him as head coach in 1994. Under Hughes, St Helens only reached the one, Regal Trophy Final, where they lost to Wigan in 1996 by 25 to 16. They finished fourth in both of Hughes' seasons in charge. The lack of trophies in the St Helens cabinet, after the club had suddenly become so accustomed to success, would need to change in the "new" brand Super League that formed in 1996; hence Hughes' departure in 1996 and replacement with Australian Shaun McRae.

=== Summer era ===
Saints became one of the most successful side of the summer era. Since the inception of Super League in 1996, they have won the title on eight occasions, and have added seven Challenge Cups to their five previous successes. They won the inaugural Super League by finishing top of the league before the playoff era. St Helens defeated Bradford 8–6 in the 1999 Super League Grand Final, their first Grand Final, with more than 50,000 people seeing Chris Joynt lift the trophy at Old Trafford. They also won the World Club Challenge in 2001 and 2007, beating Brisbane both times. In 2023 they then beat Penrith Panthers 13–12 in Australia to win it for a third time.

==== Late 1990s ====
The success of the Saints in Super League began under the leadership of Shaun McRae in 1996. During his tenure the club won one league title (1996), a year in which he was named Super League's coach of the year, and enjoyed back—to—back successes over Bradford in the Challenge Cup (1996 and 1997). St Helens lost consecutive Premiership finals to Wigan in 1996, and 1997. 1998 proved to be a trophyless year, and Ellery Hanley succeeded McRae in 1999, after the Australian left for new Super League side Gateshead. Hanley led Saints to Grand Final success against Bradford in October of his first year in charge. Hanley was considered by many to be a polarising figure and after several acrimonious disagreements with the St Helens board of directors, he was sacked a month into the following season. Ian Millward was appointed as Hanley's successor as head coach.

==== 2000s ====
===== Millward's reign and a controversial sacking (2000–2005) =====
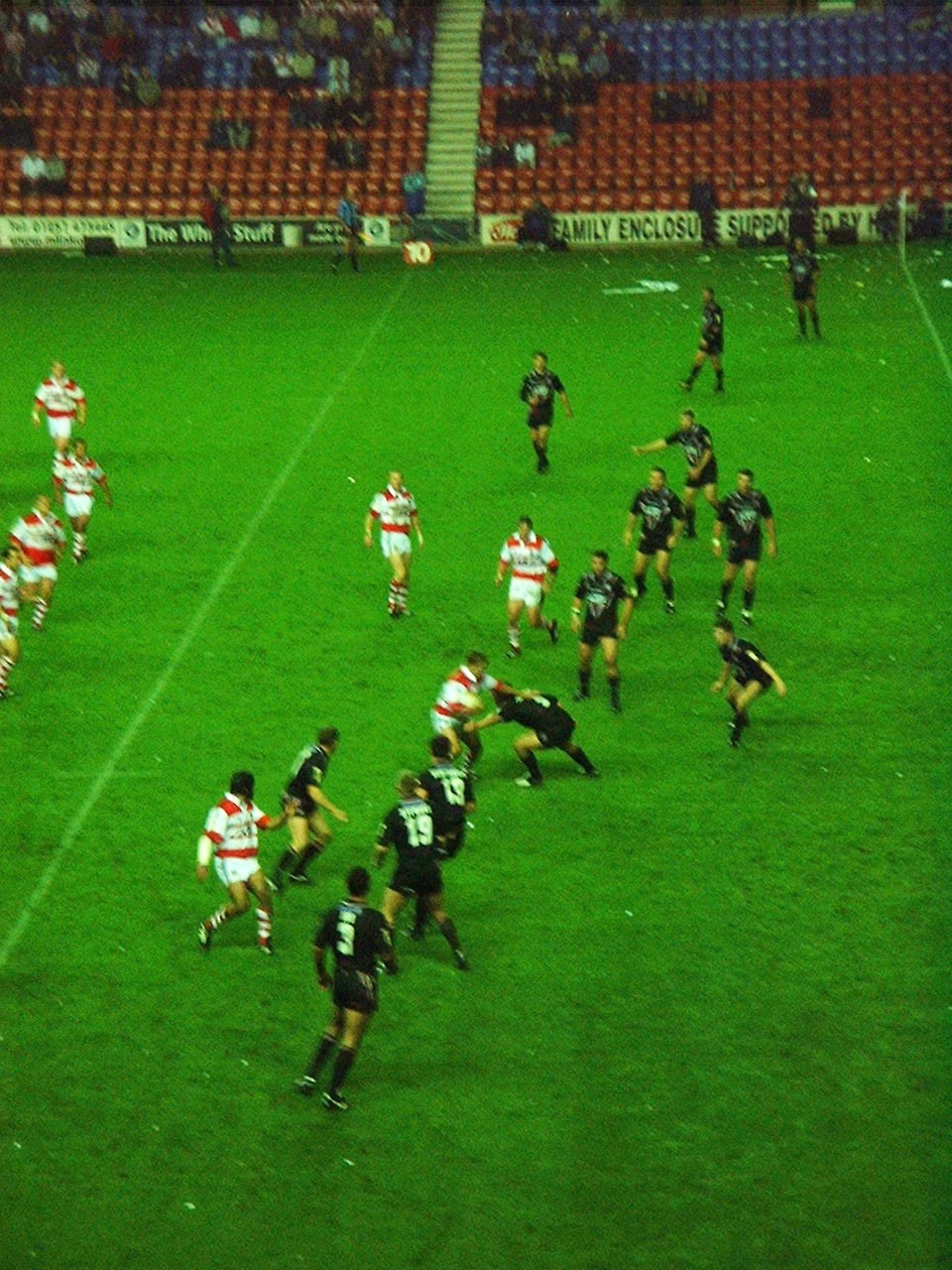
St. Helens defeated Wigan Warriors in the 2000 Super League Grand Final.

Under Millward, St Helens quickly became the most exciting team in the competition, playing expansive, attacking rugby. He saw them soundly beaten in the 2000 World Club Challenge, losing 44–6 to Melbourne, but lead them to retaining their Super League title in 2000 beating Wigan 29–16. They also won the Challenge Cup in 2001; 13–6 over Bradford, with the final held at Twickenham Stadium for the first time, and the 2001 World Club Challenge, earning a 20–18 win over the Broncos. Millward then lead Saints to the top of Super League VII, and to reclaim the Super League title in the 2002 Grand Final, Sean Long snatching a last minute 19–18 win over the Bradford with a drop—goal. They lost the 2002 Challenge Cup Final to Wigan at Murrayfield Stadium by 21 points to 12. They were hammered in the 2003 World Club Challenge by Sydney by 38 points to 0. In this season, they failed to win a trophy after being knocked out of the Challenge Cup by Leeds at the semi—final stage, and the Super League play—offs by Wigan at the same stage. In 2004 they beat arch—rivals Wigan 32–16 at the Millennium Stadium, Cardiff in front of a capacity crowd of 73,734 people to win the Challenge Cup, Long gaining his second of an eventual three Lance Todd Trophies.

Millward's reign was not without controversy and his St Helens career ended controversially after he was suspended in May 2005. He was sacked for gross misconduct a week later. Daniel Anderson was appointed as coach, Millward was then made coach of archrivals Wigan.

===== The Anderson era (2005–2008) =====
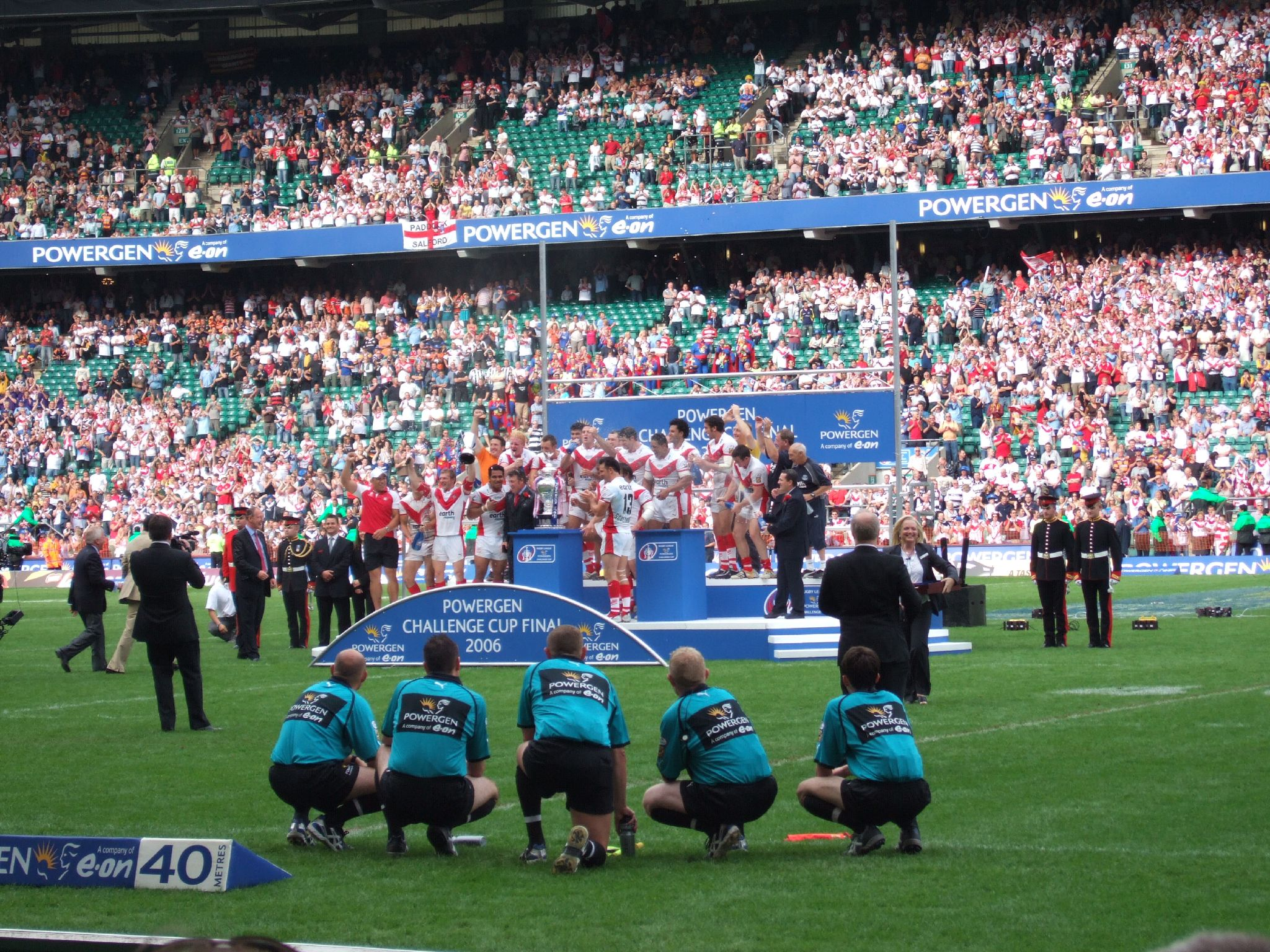
St Helens lifting the Challenge Cup trophy after the 2006 Final

Daniel Anderson saw his new team become the first team to top the Super League and fail to reach Old Trafford in 2005. However, St Helens won the 2006 Challenge Cup Final at Twickenham Stadium, beating Huddersfield 42–12. Scrum-half Sean Long was awarded the Lance Todd trophy for a record third time for his man—of—the—match performance during the final.

St Helens followed up their Challenge Cup win by claiming the League Leader's Shield, before cementing their reputation as the team of the year by defeating Hull 26 points to 4 in the Super League Grand Final. Once more St Helens confirmed their status as the outstanding team of the summer era. Additionally, Paul Wellens received the Man of Steel Award for the 2006 season.

In December 2006 St Helens were awarded with the BBC Sports Personality of the Year Team Award at the Annual BBC Sports Personality of the Year Ceremony. This accolade recognises the best team in any sport within the United Kingdom. At the same ceremony Daniel Anderson was given the BBC Sports Personality of the Year Coach Award – this was the first time a rugby league coach had won the award.

After a slow start to the 2007 season, Saints added to their history by beating Brisbane 18–14 to win the 2007 World Club Challenge.

St Helens 2007 World Club Championship winning team

8 Nick Fozzard (PR)	14 James Roby (HK)	10 Jason Cayless (PR)
11 Lee Gilmour (SR)	15 Mike Bennett (SR)
12 Jon Wilkin (LF)
7 Sean Long (SH)
6 Leon Pryce (SO)
4 Willie Talau (CE)
3 Matt Gidley (CE)
5 Francis Meli (WG)	2 Ade Gardner (WG)
1 Paul Wellens (FB)
Substitutes
9 Keiron Cunningham (HK)
18 Bryn Hargreaves (PR)
13 Paul Sculthorpe (LF)
17 James Graham (PR)

In July, they beat Super League rivals, Bradford, to reach the first Challenge Cup final at the new Wembley Stadium. Here, St Helens successfully defended their Challenge Cup by defeating Catalans Dragons 30–8 in the final on 25 August 2007. They were beaten in the Grand Final that year by Leeds by 33 points to 6, despite finishing at the top of the league ladder for the third successive season. James Roby, however, became the second St Helens player, and home—grown talent in two years to win the Man of Steel Award.

Saints success in the Challenge Cup continued in 2008 with a victory at the new Wembley Stadium, this time defeating Hull F.C. 28–16. Paul Wellens received the Lance Todd Trophy after sharing the award with team-mate Leon Pryce the year earlier.

They also achieved first place again in the 2008 Super League season—for the fourth year running—winning the League Leaders Shield, and beat Leeds 38–10 for the right to go to Old Trafford to contest the Grand Final. However, St Helens were once again defeated by Leeds in the Grand Final, by a margin of 24 to 16, on 4 October 2008. James Graham, on a positive note, made it a hat—trick of ex—Blackbrook Royals to win the Man of Steel Award whilst playing for St Helens. This would be Anderson's last game in charge of the club, as he announced he was to return to Australia and the Parramatta Eels of the NRL. St Helens fans and players alike were saddened to see Anderson leave, after not only upholding the tradition of St Helens exciting brand of rugby, but giving them a defensive and disciplined edge that was never apparent under Ian Millward. His personality and relationship with the fans was an additional reason why St Helens fans were disgruntled in him leaving after four years in charge and why next boss Mick Potter faced a fair amount of criticism in his initial period as boss.

===== The Potter years (2009–2010) =====
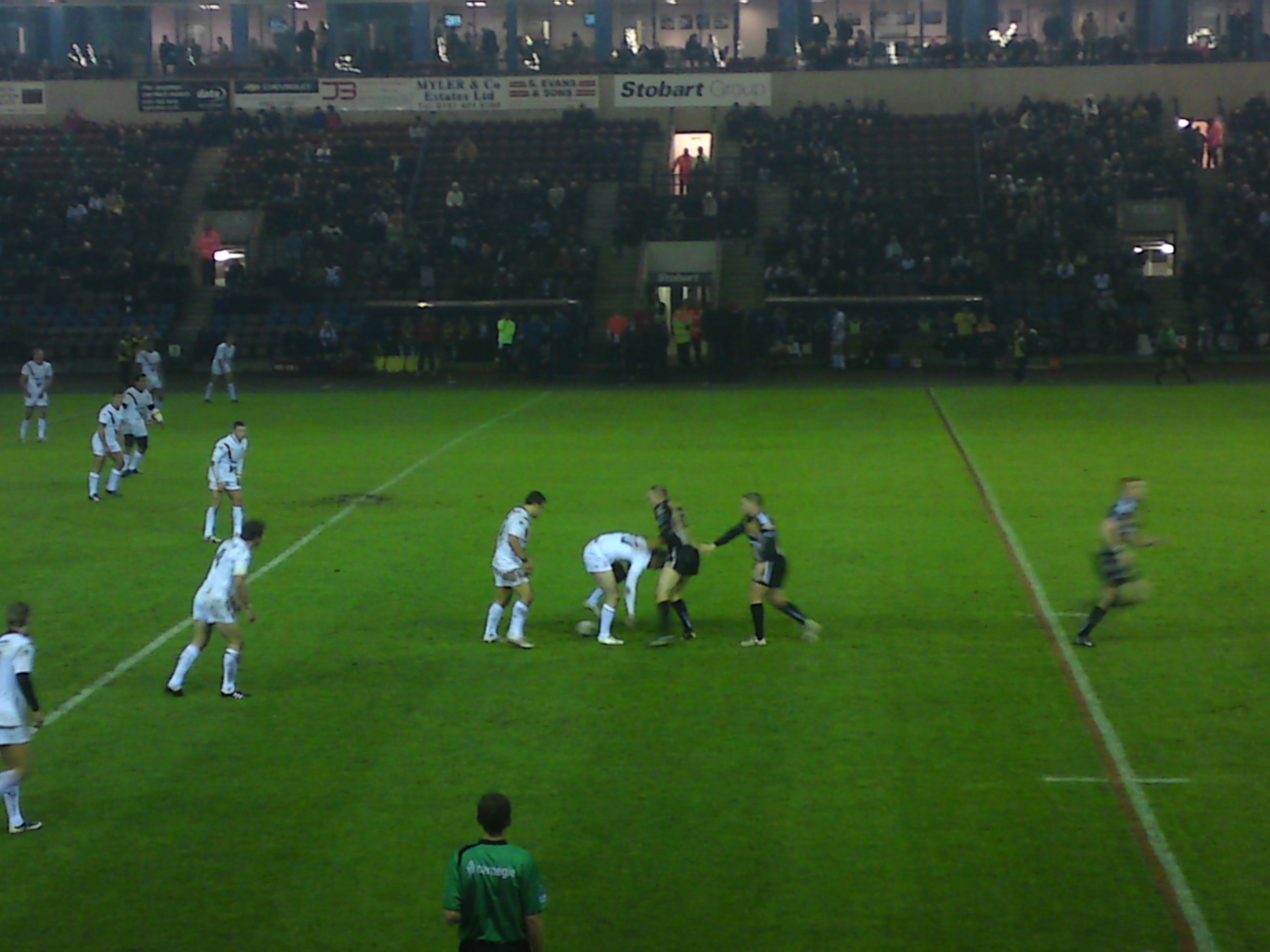
St Helens against Widnes Vikings in the pre-season 2010 Karalius Cup

Mick Potter was announced as the successor to Anderson, which received many plaudits from the St. Helens fans and the European game as a whole, as the year previous he had led the Catalans Dragons to a record—high third—placed finish in the league. On 9 August 2009, St Helens reached a record ninth consecutive Challenge Cup semi—final, where they were beaten by 24 points to 14 by the Huddersfield Giants. This prevented Saints from reaching the final at the new Wembley Stadium for a third successive time and from winning the cup for a fourth time running. This defeat naturally came as a shock to the St Helens faithful, after so often in the last 15 years seeing the team reach the pinnacle of this competition and go on to win the cup. It was from here that the criticism began, and questions were raised particularly of his tactics and his activity (or lack of) in the transfer market.

On 3 October 2009, Saints defeated fierce rivals the Wigan Warriors to book their place at a fourth consecutive Super League Grand Final, only to lose out to the Leeds Rhinos in the final, 18–10, making the Leeds Rhinos the only team to win the Grand Final three times consecutively. A 20-year-old Kyle Eastmond scored all of Saints' points. A trophyless year for the first time since 2003 was another catalyst to Potter's critics abusing and slating his appointment, with even rumours of rifts within the changing rooms.

==== 2010s ====
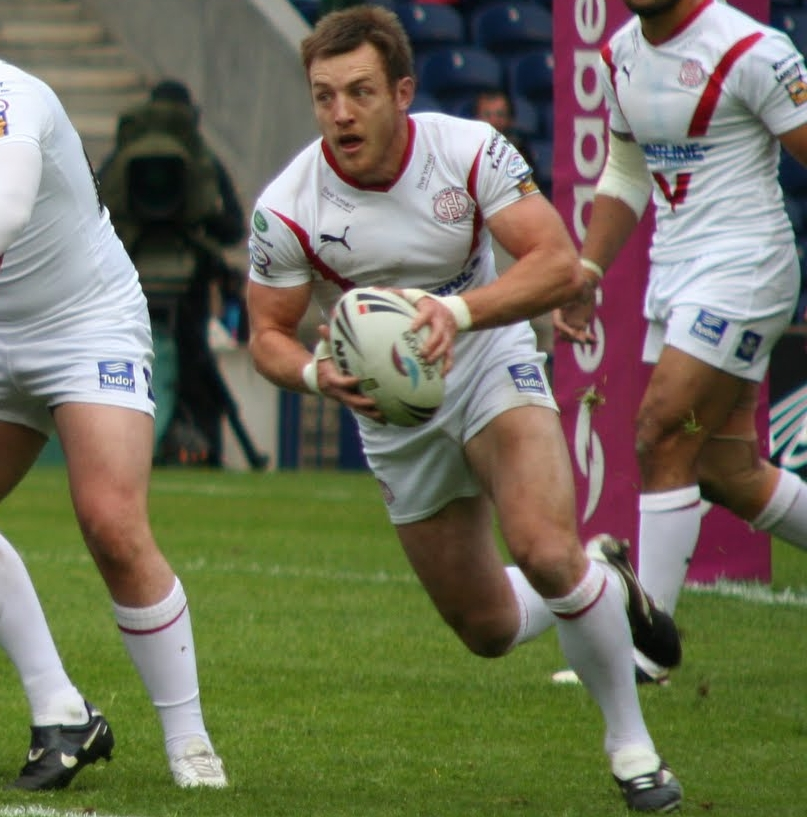
James Roby in 2010

2010 was the year that saw Potter surrender to his critics and leave St. Helens. Criticisms from club legends like Paul Sculthorpe and Sean Long regarding his personal skills with the fans, as well as the continued fan rejection saw him let his contract run out and, initially, seek a job in the NRL, but eventually, and perhaps surprisingly, join Bradford on a two—year contract. Names like Royce Simmons, Mal Meninga, and assistant coach Kieron Purtill, were linked with the job for 2011. Simmons was the chosen man for the job, as announced on 22 July 2010. The 2010 season would also see legendary hooker and captain Keiron Cunningham retire from the game after 17 years with his one and only club. However, Cunningham would not be leaving without leaving a lasting legacy on the club. A lifelike bronze statue of Cunningham was built and placed on display in the town, before being transported to the club's new stadium upon its construction in 2012. He would additionally take up a coaching role with the academy, as well as a strength and conditioning role with the first team. In light of these decisions, neither Cunningham nor Potter halted their personal and the St Helens team quest for success; shown by their tenth successive semi—final appearance in the Challenge Cup. However, Saints failure to perform on the big stage was once more shown, going down in this semi—final by 32–28. Defeating Huddersfield Giants in the qualifying semi—final in the 2010 play-off series by 42–22 not only saw Saints qualify for their fifth Grand Final in five years, but also saw the final ever game to be played at Knowsley Road. Fittingly, Cunningham snatched the final ever try at the famous old ground in typical fashion from dummy—half. However, for the fourth year running, St Helens once more proved flops in the Grand Final. One of the finest finals of the Super League era was anticipated, but the flamboyant Saints that the fans saw so rarely under Potter once more failed to materialise, and, in front of a near sell—out crowd of 71,526, they fell to a 22–10 loss to rivals Wigan. It was not the romantic finish to the Saints careers of Potter, Cunningham or any of the departing members of the squad that many had hoped for, but nevertheless, a new era was just around the corner, as Simmons' reign began.

===== Beginning of a new era (2011–2018) =====
Australian Royce Simmons took over from compatriot Mick Potter for the start of the 2011 season. As the club awaited completion of the new stadium, all home fixtures in 2011 were played at the Halton Stadium in Widnes, effectively meaning St Helens were forced to play an entire season of away fixtures. In addition, they suffered upheaval in terms of the playing squad; having already lost the influential Cunningham to retirement and other club legends like Sean Long, the start of the season was overshadowed by the news that Kyle Eastmond, who had been earmarked as Long's replacement, and inspirational leader James Graham were both looking to leave the club. A number of serious injuries to further key players such as Leon Pryce and Ade Gardner meant the team was facing an uphill battle on the field all season. However, despite all the problems faced, St Helens defied the odds to reach their 11th Challenge Cup semi-final in a row, and at the end of the season they qualified for their sixth consecutive Grand Final. However, for the fifth year in a row they were on the losing side, as the injury-plagued squad finally succumbed to Leeds. However, the 2011 season saw the emergence of a new crop of talent, with players such as Jonny Lomax and Lee Gaskell stepping up to fill the gaps left by senior players and earning rave reviews for their performances.

In 2012, the club moved into their new home at Langtree Park. However, the season started with a terrible run of results, which culminated in Royce Simmons being sacked in March. With assistant coach Kieron Purtill also leaving, the coaching reins were taken up by youth coach Mike Rush for the remainder of the 2012 season, with Keiron Cunningham acting as his assistant. Following St Helens's defeat by Wigan in the quarter-final of the Challenge Cup, which ended a run of 11 consecutive semi-final appearances, it was announced that Nathan Brown would be taking over as head coach for 2013, with Rush moving back into his previous role.

At the end of the Super League XIX regular season, St Helens claimed the League Leaders' Shield and reached the 2014 Super League Grand Final against Wigan where they won the match 14–6 claiming their 13th premiership.

In the Super League XXIII season, St Helens claimed the League Leader's Shield and Ben Barba who had joined the club that year won the Man of Steel award. St Helens were favourites to reach another grand final but were upset in the preliminary final by Warrington 18–13 at Langtree Park.

During the Super League XXIV season, St Helens reached the Challenge Cup final against Warrington but lost the match 18–4 at Wembley Stadium.

===== The "Four-Peat" and World Club Challenge =====
At the end of the Super League XXIV regular season, St Helens won the League Leader's Shield for a second consecutive year after finished 16 points clear of second placed Wigan. St Helens would go on to reach the 2019 Super League Grand Final at Old Trafford against Salford. St Helens won the match 23–6 securing their 14th championship.

At the end of the 2020 season, St Helens finished second behind league leaders Wigan. After easily accounting for Catalans Dragons in the semi-final, St Helens played against Wigan in the 2020 Super League Grand Final. With only seconds remaining and with the scores locked at 4–4, St Helens scored a try after the siren through Jack Welsby to win back to back championships in the most dramatic of circumstances.

On 17 July 2021, St. Helens won the Challenge Cup for the first time in 13 years beating Castleford in the final 26–12. St. Helens had trailed the match at half-time 12–6. St Helens finished the 2021 Super League season in second place on the table. They then went on to defeat Catalan Dragons 12–10 in a hotly-contested Grand Final, securing the club's first league and cup double since 2006 and an historic 'three-peat' – becoming only the second team in the summer era to win three consecutive championships.

St Helens ended the 2022 regular season as League Leaders, thus earning them a bye to the semi-finals. They beat Salford 19–12, to reach their 4th consecutive Grand Final. They faced Leeds in the Grand Final, after Leeds beat Catalans in the eliminators, and Wigan in the semi-final. St Helens won the match 24–12, to win their fourth final in a row, and by doing so, they become the first team in Super League history to win four in a row.

Before the start of the 2023 Super League season, St Helens travelled to Australia for the 2023 World Club Challenge. A week before the match, St Helens played one pre-season trial fixture against St. George Illawarra which St Helens won 30–18 at WIN Stadium. In the week leading up to the World Club Challenge game against Penrith, many pundits, former players and coaches predicted St Helens would lose the match heavily with Phil Gould stating "Penrith should be allowed to declare at half-time". St Helens would go on to win the World Club Challenge game 13–12 in golden point extra-time to claim their third trophy in the competition. St Helens had led the match 12–0 until a late try by Penrith took the game into extra-time.

St Helens 2023 World Club Championship winning team

8 Matty Lees (PR)	14 James Roby (HK)	10 Alex Walmsley (PR)
11 Sione Matau'tia (SR)	16 Curtis Sironen (SR)
13 Morgan Knowles (LF)
7 Lewis Dodd (SH)
6 Jonny Lomax (SO)
4 Mark Percival (CE)
23 Konrad Hurrell (CE)
3 Will Hopoate (WG)	2 Tommy Makinson (WG)
1 Jack Welsby (FB)
Substitutes
14 Joey Lussick (HK)
15 Louis McCarthy-Scarsbrook (PR)
17 Agnatius Paasi (PR)
18 Jake Wingfield (LF)
19 James Bell (SR)

===== Post 2023 World Club Challenge =====
In the 2023 Super League season, St Helens finished third on the table equal on points with league leaders Wigan and the Catalans Dragons. In the elimination playoff, the club defeated Warrington which set up a match with Catalans at the Stade Gilbert Brutus. St Helens lead the match until the final minute when Catalans player Sam Tomkins scored a try underneath the posts to win the match for Catalans and end St Helens four-year dominance of the competition.

St Helens began the 2024 Super League season strongly winning six of their opening seven games. However, injuries in the middle of the season to key players saw results drop. On 26 July 2024, St Helens were defeated by Leigh 46–4 which meant the club had lost five matches in a row for the first time since the Super League era began. St Helens would finish the 2024 Super League season in sixth place on the table, their lowest finish of the Super League era. The club were eliminated in the first week of the playoffs against Warrington. St Helens were not expected to win the game but took Warrington to golden point extra-time where George Williams would kick the winning drop goal for Warrington.

In the 2025 Super League season, St Helens would finish 5th on the table. In the playoff eliminator against Leeds, the club trailed by 10 points with less than nine minutes remaining before they scored two tries to win the match 16–14. The final try was scored after the full-time siren and was reminiscent of the "wide to west" try which was scored by the club 25 years prior. In the semi-final against league leaders Hull Kingston Rovers, the club would succumb to a 20–12 loss which ended their season.

In November 2025, Paul Rowley was appointed as the new head coach of St Helens. In round 18 of the 2026 Super League season under Rowley, St Helens would lose 46-0 at home against Toulouse Olympique. It was the first time St Helens had been held scoreless in a home Super League game, and the first time in all of its predecessor competitions since 1980.

On 23 July 2026, Paul Rowley stood down as head coach with immediate effect, with assistant coach Eamon O'Carroll taking over in the interim

On 20 August 2026, it was announced that Kevin Walters would take over the head coach role on a three-year deal starting in the 2027 season. At the end of the 2026 Super League season, St Helens missed the playoffs finishing in seventh on the table. It was the first time in 64 years that St Helens had missed the playoffs.

== Academy ==
Players who began their professional career in the academy and reserves (previously known as the "St Helens Colts") include Steve Prescott, Paul Forber, Gary Connolly, and Chris Arkwright. Players have come from areas such as Widnes, Wigan, Cumbria and Oldham. Daniel Brotherton, a winger from Northampton, signed a professional contract with the club from Northampton Demons.

== Rivalries ==
=== Wigan Warriors ===
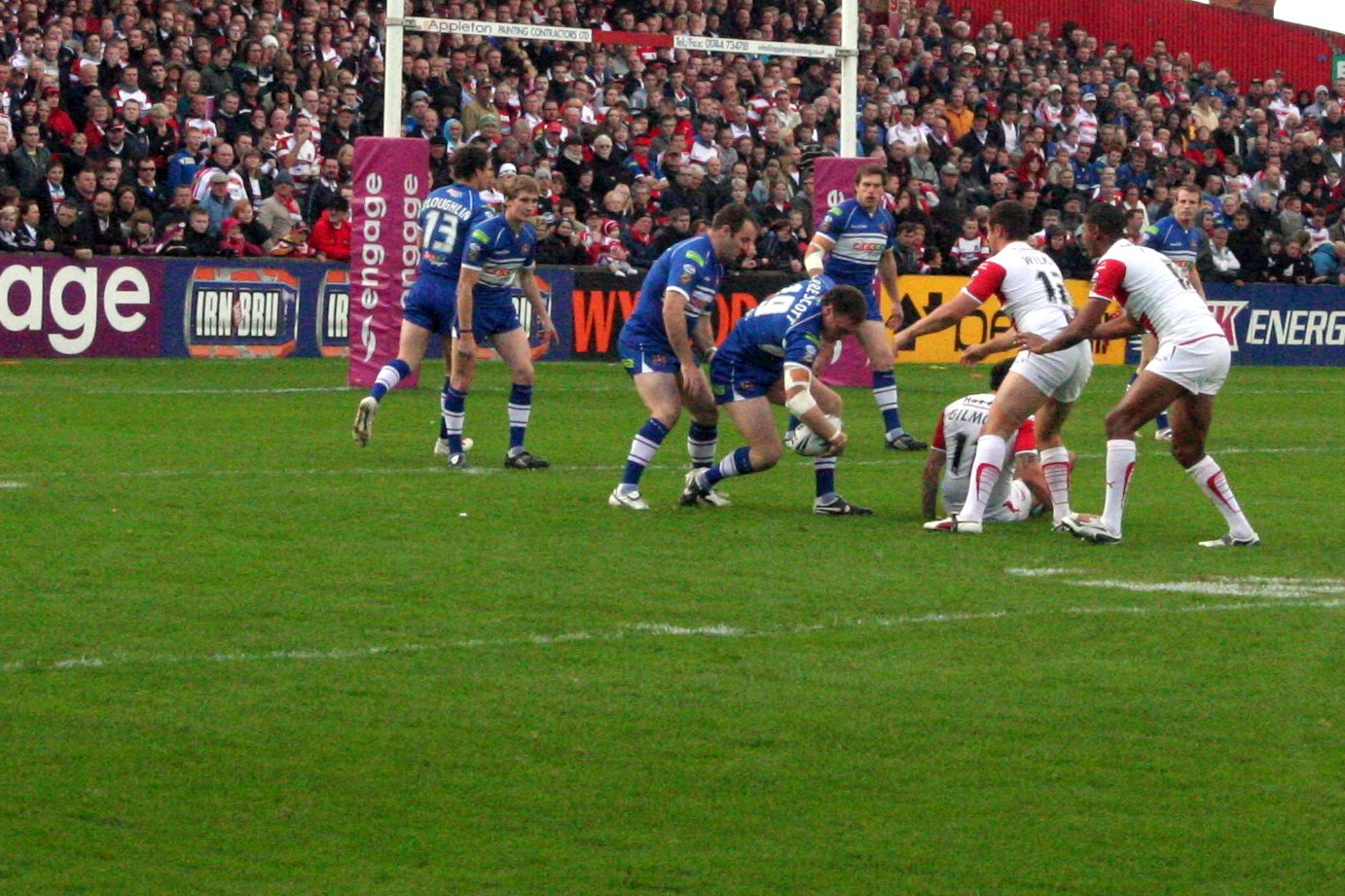
St Helens against Wigan in the semi-final play-off eliminator in 2009

There is a strong rivalry between St Helens and Wigan; the local derby between the two clubs has been traditionally regarded as the biggest in British rugby league, as well as one of the oldest in world rugby league. Both being founder members of the Northern Rugby Football Union, the derby has been played since 1895, making it amongst the most historical derbys in both British and global rugby league. Remarkably, the first encounter between the fierce rivals ended in a 0–0 draw at Knowsley Road, The games were traditionally played on Boxing Day, however were moved to Good Friday, during the busy Easter period in rugby league. More recently, the game was even played on Maundy Thursday in Super League. In all league encounters between the two since 1895, there have been 235 games, with Wigan having won nearly double the number of games that St Helens have. Saints winning 83, drawing 11 and losing 141. All competitive games, i.e. cup and league games combined, show that in the 366 games played, St Helens have won 141, there have been 19 draws and Wigan have won 206. They too have contested no fewer than 6 Challenge Cup Finals, and have met in three Super League Grand Finals; St Helens winning 29–16 in 2000, with Wigan initially gaining revenge in 2010, with a 22–10 win, before Saints claimed the 2014 Super League Grand Final by a score of 14–6, taking a 2–1 lead in their Super League Grand Final head-to-heads. Wigan and St Helens have also met in 4 Premiership Finals, Wigan winning 3, St Helens once, 3 Lancashire County Cup Finals, St Helens winning two, Wigan one, and one Floodlit Trophy Final in 1968, Wigan winning 7–4. The two have traditionally met each other in the Magic Weekend too. The two teams have a pretty even record, winning two (at Millennium Stadium in 2007 and 2008) and losing two (at Murrayfield in 2009 and Etihad Stadium in 2012), with one draw (at Millennium Stadium in 2011) in five ties. St Helens greatest winning margin and the highest game score between the two in competitive football was a 75–0 win in a 2005 Challenge Cup round 6 game. Wigan's biggest win was a 65–12 win in Super League II, 1997.

Super League record
Win	Draw	Loss
26	4	30

=== Bradford Bulls ===
Saints contested several finals in the modern game with Bradford Bulls, following up from their vast successes respectively in previous decades. When known as Bradford Northern, Bradford experienced their period of success largely in the 1940s, at a time when St Helens struggled to compete due to the commitments of World War II. In fact, it was only in the 1950s that St Helens won their first Challenge Cup and National League, and at this time, when St Helens were establishing themselves and improving in the 1950s, and 1960s, Bradford were disproving, and in fact folded in 1963. So the contest between the two can be doubted as a historical or traditional one. However, during the modern, Summer era, the game between the two gained prestige. The two contested consecutive Challenge Cup finals in 1996 and 1997, and later in 2001, St Helens winning all three. In Super League Grand Finals, St Helens and Bradford met twice, in 1999 and 2002, St Helens again winning all encounters.

Super League record
Win	Draw	Loss
24	1	20

=== Leeds Rhinos ===
Leeds have arguably the strongest rivalry with St Helens, out of all the Yorkshire clubs that have a history with St Helens. They have contested the last three Super League finals, but the rugby they have produced in recent years is considered amongst the best in Super League. The derby is also sometimes considered a contest in terms of pride between the two counties. Leeds and St Helens have also a historical background, contesting the 1971–72 and 1977–78 Challenge Cup Finals, each team winning one each. However, the derby is often noted for its bad behaviour—on and off the field. Especially recently, with incidents like the Ryan Bailey "chicken wing" tackle on Maurie Fa'asavalu in 2008, the presence of James Graham when the two meet, as well as the numerous fights that have broken out between the two sets of players, the game is certainly regarded as a feisty one, as well as one that produces entertaining rugby. Such activities off the field and between games like fights between supporters, has led to some fans being discouraged from attending the fixture at Knowsley Road; shown by somewhat disappointing crowd figures, such as an example of 11,048 in 2010.

Super League record
Win	Draw	Loss
24	0	23

=== Warrington Wolves ===
The other "big" North West club in Super League, Warrington, have also built up an anticipated derby contest with St Helens, particularly within Super League. As St Helens are unbeaten at Knowsley Road against the Wire since 1996, as well as boasting a generally impressive record against the Wolves in all meetings in Super League, the game is seen as an opportunity for Warrington to rectify their record against the Saints. In terms of cup and league final meetings; the two have met in two Lancashire Cup finals, St Helens winning once after a replay in 1967, and one Premiership final, St Helens winning in 1977. However, they remarkably have never met in Challenge Cup or Super League Finals. On 26 February 2011, Warrington Wolves beat St. Helens for the first time in 10 years ending the Saints Hoodoo over the club. The fixture was played at the Saints temporary home at Widnes. The Wolves also beat the Saints in the reverse fixture to do the league double for the first time in 17 years. In 2012 the Wolves beat St. Helens in the Grand Final elimination clash at Langtree Park to book the Warrington Wolves a place at the Grand Final.

Super League record
Win	Draw	Loss
35	2	9

== Associates ==
=== Junior rugby in St Helens ===
There is a massive junior and youth contingent of rugby league players in St Helens. Clubs such as Thatto Heath and Blackbrook Royals have produced many of the former and current superstars in St Helens' squads over the years, and continue to do so. Clubs in the St Helens area also include Bold Miners, Portico Vine, Pilkington Recs, Haydock Warriors, Newton Storm, Eccleston Lions and Haresfinch Hawks which provide players for St Helens through the junior years and the scholarship schemes at the club, before eventually signing professionally at 16. But St Helens' youth roots do not stop in the St Helens area. Indeed, club legend Keiron Cunningham signed for the club from Wigan St Judes, and Saints also look to clubs like Wigan St Patricks and Orrell St James in the Wigan area, and Halton Farnworth Hornets in the Widnes area for youth talent. However, a criticism of the St Helens scouting system is that they tend not to look at players beyond the junior ages (6–16 years old), and talented players who continue into amateur rugby tend to be signed very rarely.

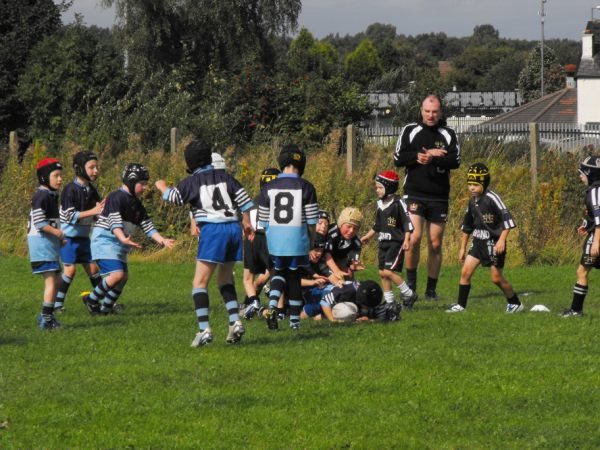
Blackbrook Royals have a large contingent of players in St Helens first team squad.

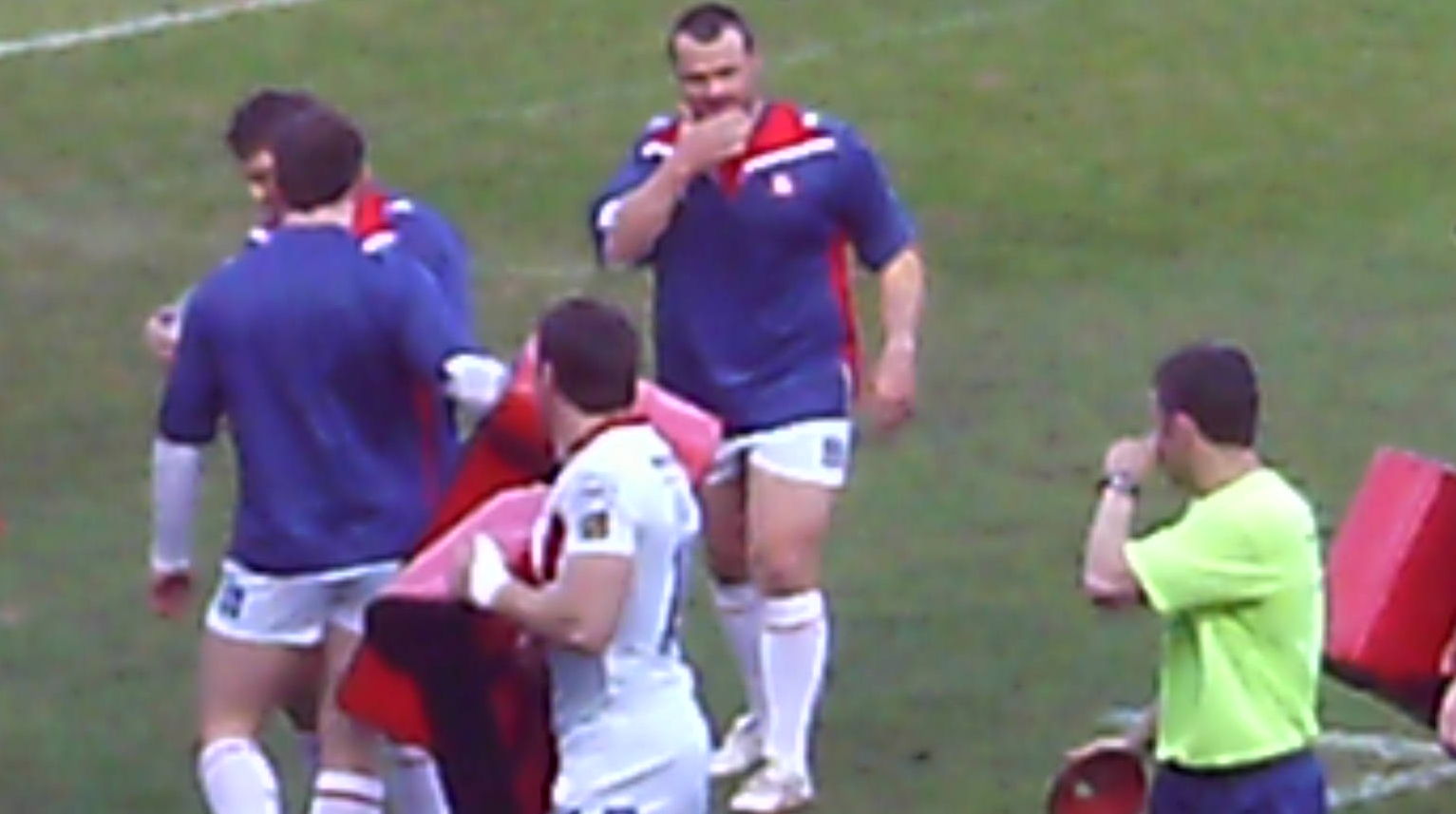
Keiron Cunningham, perhaps the prime example of St Helens deep roots in junior rugby

=== Feeder clubs ===
Without having strict feeder sides, such as the system that exists in Australasia, St Helens have, in the last 20 years, particularly with the inception of the dual—registration scheme in 2009, built up partnerships with Co-operative Championship sides like Widnes and Leigh. St Helens have also been known to loan fringe players to "less strong" Super League sides such as Salford and Crusaders and previously Widnes. St Helens have also forged links with the Canada Rugby League (CRL) and their team Toronto City Saints, who have adopted the popular piece of St Helens insignia in their crest. Outside of rugby league, St Helens have forged partnerships with British Basketball League side Mersey Tigers, and English Premier Ice Hockey League team Manchester Phoenix.

== Supporters ==
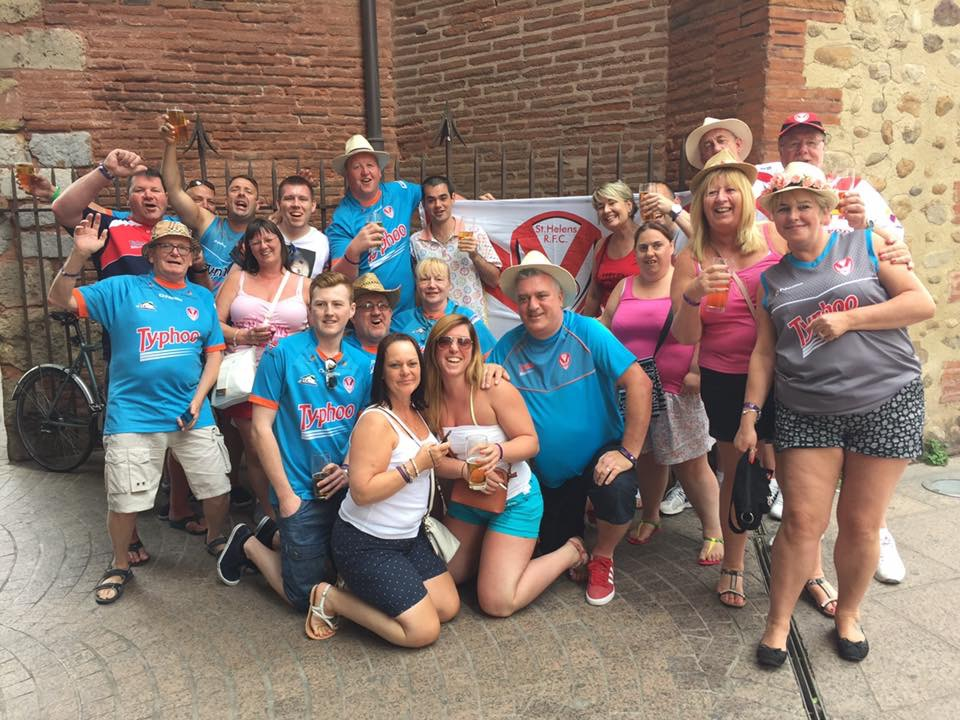
St Helens fans in Perpignan 2016

St Helens are one of the best supported teams in Super League, averaging 11,543 according to 2014 figures. Situated, prior to their recent move to Widnes, in Eccleston and Thatto Heath, a lot of support naturally derives from that area. Many strongholds of support also come from the Eastern side of the town; areas like Blackbrook, Haydock, and Parr. However, there exists considerable support towards Newton, Billinge and Ashton also. Their support is also not restricted to the town, with bases in Liverpool, Manchester, Birmingham, Northamptonshire, the South and North Wales.

The club also have their own supporters clubs, one for the club itself which has folded, and one for fans in the South. International, as well as national support is also strong with Saints. A recent survey showed fan bases in Australia, the United States, France, Spain, Ireland, Scotland, Canada, the Middle East, Chile and Greece. The club also have something of a fan base forming in the Far East, with fans from Singapore and Japan.

Super League crowd averages

Year	Average
1996	10,221
1997	8,826
1998	7,081
1999	8,201
2000	8,880
2001	8,801
2002	9,928
2003	9,819
2004	9,507
2005	10,622
2006	10,721
2007	9,717
2008	10,642
2009	10,985
2010	11,191
2011	7,863
2012	14,221
2013	11,279
2014	11,543
2015	12,364
2016	10,711
2017	10,749
2018	11,478
2019	11,910
2020	12,845
2021	9,839
2022	11,851
2023	12,695
2024	13,105
2025	11,618

=== Notable fans ===
- David Bernstein—former Chairman of The Football Association
- Rob Broughton—professional mixed martial artist of the Ultimate Fighting Championship
- Stephen Bunting—professional darts player who plays in the Professional Darts Corporation
- Gordon Burns—retired television broadcaster
- Tim Cahill—Australia and Everton F.C. footballer
- Dave Chisnall—professional darts player who plays in the Professional Darts Corporation
- Ricky Hatton—retired welterweight champion boxer
- Sue Johnston – Actress, known for her role in The Royle Family
- Phil Lesh—bass player with The Grateful Dead
- Craig Lyon—bantamweight boxer
- Martin Murray—Commonwealth middleweight champion boxer
- Ray Peacock—comedian and actor
- Michael Smith—professional darts player who plays in the Professional Darts Corporation
- Ricky Tomlinson—actor
- Johnny Vegas—actor and comedian

== Colours and badge ==
=== Colours ===
In their rugby football days and early years as a rugby league club, St Helens wore a vertically striped blue and white jersey with blue shorts and socks. In their initial period at Knowsley Road, St Helens wore a similar jersey, but the stripes were horizontal, and the colours were blue and grey. These colours however were dropped in favour of a more traditional to today, red and white design. The jersey had a single broad red horizontal band, on a white background, and was used until 1961.

Very early kit
Kit until 1961
1961–present

St Helens heritage jersey, first used in 1890.

In the 1961 Challenge Cup final against Wigan, the strip still seen today—the famous red V—was first utilised. In 1981, the club changed colours again, albeit temporarily, when Umbro designed and manufactured a French—style jersey of blue, with a white and red V. These colours were donned for two years, before the traditional colours were reverted to.

1985 saw the first jersey that was supported by a visible sponsor—St Helens Glass. Umbro were once again the designers of this varsity blue jersey with a royal blue vee—shaped chevron, a kit similar to the away kit of 2008. This was also the first jersey to feature the famous stickman of St Helens insignia. The 1985 New Zealand tour jersey was similar to the home shirt of 2009, sponsored also by Pilkington.

Between 1991 and 1994, a somewhat controversial and odd design of jersey was employed, where the chevron that St Helens had now adopted in place of the traditional V finished three—quarters of the way down the shirt. Umbro remained the club's kit suppliers until 1994, when Stag took over. Their jerseys were far more lightweight than what they had replaced, and they chose to revert to a more conventional fashion of red V in their designs. The kit used first by the club was reverted to during their centenary year in 1995.

1991/92 kit
1996 kit
(used again in 2026)
1997 kit

In 1997, yet another change of design that was controversial with the fans, a kit that featured a white drop—down V with a black and red mesh design at the bottom of the jersey. This was Mizuno's first design, taking over from Stag. The traditional red V was once more reverted to, after the controversial design, with a more circular design used for the 1999 season. In 2000, a more regular V was seen again. In 2003, a triple—V design was seen, and the first to be used by long—serving kit designers Puma AG. 2004 saw a double curvy red V used, before, in 2005, yet again tradition was reverted to in the design and this design was used until 2009. The away strip used in 2005 was the famous blue strip with a dark blue V. 2009 saw the long red V of 1985's design appear again, before, in 2010, a casual thin red V was seen.

In 2010, the club used the first kit they played a rugby league game design as a commemorative strip, to celebrate their 110th and final year at the ground. 2011 saw the Puma contract expire, and Australian manufacturing giants ISC take over the making of the jerseys. This strip saw a somewhat shorter red vee, compared to the ventures of the design in 2009 and '10.

=== Badge ===
The badge used by the club between 1997 and 2010.

The old crest used by the club before 1997. This version was also worn in the 2026 season.

The club's jerseys were initially adorned by the town's coat of arms. This was utilised until 1985. However, as Saints became a more national institution, they decided that a more recognisable badge needed to be adopted. The 1985 season therefore saw the famous stickman of St Helens first used. This was used as the main jersey emblem until 1991, when the St Helens sports club emblem, not dissimilar to the coat of arms used previously, was seen. This was used until 1996, when, with the implement of Super League into the British rugby league calendar, Saints chose to display a badge that featured an overlapping "S" and "H" in red, with the club's name around the border. This was used until 2010.

The club decided to unofficially rebrand to "Saints RL", to coincide with them leaving Knowsley Road, and going "on the road" to Widnes for a season. The new crest was in the shape of a shield, and featured the over lapping "S" and "H" that the previous logo featured, but also displayed a red vee within the design, and "Saints RL" in upper case lettering at the top of the shield. This new crest drew criticism from large sections of the St Helens faithful, who were afraid of the club losing its connection to the town to attract a wider fan base.

=== Kit manufacturers and sponsors ===
Since 2015 St Helens' kit has been supplied by O'Neills. Previous suppliers include Umbro (1986–94), Stag (1995–96), Mizuno Corporation (1997–99), Y2K (2000), Exito (2001–02), Puma (2003–10), and ISC (2011–14).

Their current main shirt sponsor is Home Bargains. Previous main sponsors have included St Helens Glass (1986–87, 2000–01), McEwan's Lager (1987–98), John Smith's (1999), Caledonia (2002), Comodo (2003), All Sports (2004–05), Earth money (2006–07), Pilkington Activ (2008–09), Frontline (2010), Medicash (2011), Typhoo (2012–2016), RCMA Group (2017), and Cash Converters (2018–2021). St. Helens were also sponsored by Gillette for a one-off appearance at the 2004 Dubai Rugby 7s invitational.

See Below:

Year	Sponsor	Manufacturer
1986–87	St Helens Glass	Umbro
1988–94	McEwan's Lager	Umbro
1995–96	McEwan's Lager	Stag
1997–98	McEwan's Lager	Mizuno
1999	John Smith's	Mizuno
2000	St Helens Glass	Y2K
2001	St Helens Glass	Excito
2002	Caledonia	Excito
2003	Comodo	Puma
2004–05	All:Sports	Puma
2006–07	Earth Money	Puma
2008–09	Pilkington Activ	Puma
2010	Frontline	Puma
2011	Medicash	ISC
2012–14	Typhoo	ISC
2015–16	Typhoo	O'Neills
2017	RCMA Group	O'Neills
2018–21	Cash Converters	O'Neills
2022–27	Home Bargains	O'Neills

== Mascots ==
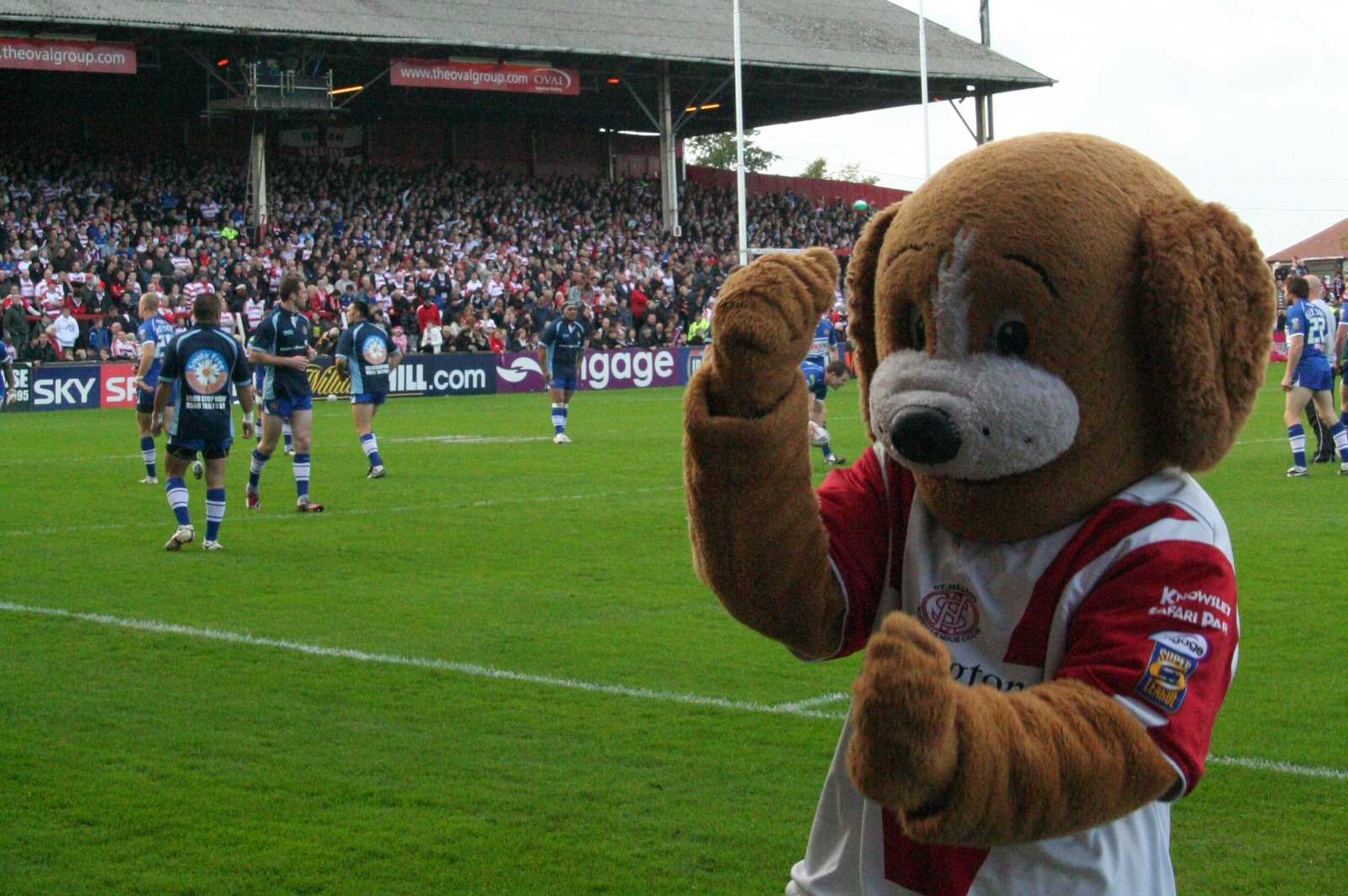
Boots before the Wigan derby in 2009

During the Super League era, the participating teams have adopted mascots and nicknames usually in alliteration with the name of their home town. Initially, the St Helens mascots were Bernard and Bernadette, St Bernard dogs; depicting something of a married couple with their on-field humorous antics. However, in 2009, the mascots changed to Boots and Bernard; happy and angry masculine characters. Bernard doesn't appear as often as Boots, with Boots being a more child-friendly image for the club, while Bernard retains the 'seriousness' of the mascots role to the club.

== Stadia ==
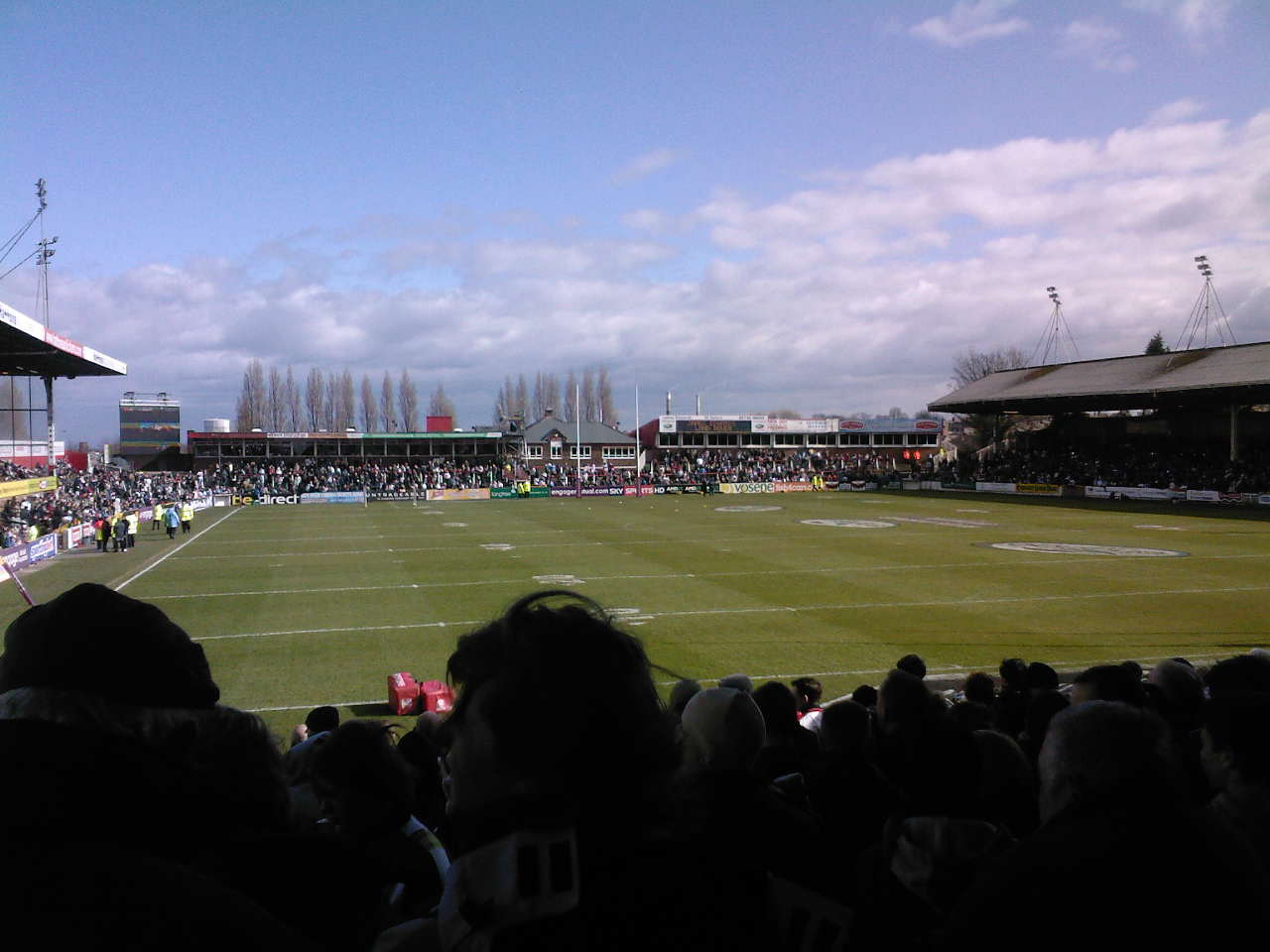
Knowsley Road from the Away End view

St Helens' former stadium was Knowsley Road, renamed in 2008 to the GPW Recruitment Stadium for sponsorship reasons. Prior to this, in particular when St Helens were playing simply rugby football, they shared the City Ground with St Helens Recs. They left this stadium in 1890 for Knowsley Road and played there for 120 years. The ground at the time of its construction was considered modern, with one seated stand, and three standing areas that could, prior to strict safety regulations set in place, hold up to 40,000 people, shown by their record home crowd of 35,695 against Wigan in 1949.

In their first match at the new ground, St Helens beat Manchester Rangers, played under rugby football rules. After the great schism of 1895, and St Helens joining the NRFU, their first game at Knowsley Road under traditional rugby league rules was against Rochdale, in front of 3,000 spectators. Over the years, however, age took its toll on the ground. Despite the big names like Meninga, van Vollenhoven, Lyon etc. coming to the club, it was constantly argued that, unlike other big clubs, St Helens did not have the stadium to suit their on-field talent. In 2006, the ground was treated to something of a makeover, after financial input from St Helens big money sponsors Earth Money. This aided the ground in gaining international rugby, with a fixture between Great Britain and New Zealand being held there in 2006.

In 2008, St Helens were given a warning letter from the RFL, as a result of the ensuing licensing system that was to be introduced into Super League in 2009, stating that the quality of their current stadium was too poor for the expected quality of a licence in the league. Thankfully for Saints, they were permitted by the council to begin construction on a new ground, and confirmed that they would move away from Knowsley Road in 2011.

It was announced that the new complex, to be built on an unused glass site in Peasley Cross, was to feature at least 12,000 seats, a large car park, and a Tesco store next to the ground. In addition to this, an iconic bridge, directly linking the ground to the town centre went under construction on 9 August 2010. Whether the stadium would be ready for the beginning of the 2011 season was always uncertain, and grounds such as Leigh Sports Village were suggested to home Saints for the period between. However, the Halton Stadium, Widnes was the chosen venue for Saints for the 2011 season, and they played all of their home games there, before permanently relocating in 2012. Saints currently play at the BrewDog Stadium.

== 2027 squad ==
2027 St Helens R.F.C. Squad
First team squad			Coaching staff
(England) Jake Burns – HK; (England) Jack Campbell – FB, WG; (England) Daryl Clark – HK; (England) Deon Cross – WG, CE; (England) Owen Dagnall – WG, CE; (England) Jake Davies – SR; (England) George Delaney – PR; (England) Jacob Douglas – WG; (England) Matty Evans – PR, LF; (Australia) Solomona Faataape – CE; (England) Tom Forber – HK	(Australia) Jacob Host – SR, PR; (England) Tom Humphreys – HK, SH; (Australia) David Klemmer – PR, LF; (England) Oscar Knox – SR; (England) Matty Lees (c) – PR; (England) Lukas Mason – SR; (England) Tyler McGann – FB, SH; (England) Lewis Murphy – WG; (Australia) Sean O'Sullivan – SH, SO; (England) Harry Robertson – FB, CE, SO; (Australia) Tristan Sailor – FB, SO, WG (gk); (Australia) Curtis Sironen – SR	(England) Joe Shorrocks – LF, SR; (Australia) Tom Starling – HK; (England) Noah Stephens – PR; (Australia) Daniel Suluka-Fifita – PR; (England) Alfie Tate – PR; (Tonga) Christian Tuipulotu – WG; (England) Alex Walmsley – PR; (England) Jack Welsby – FB, SO, CE, WG; (England) George Whitby – SH (gk); (England) Matt Whitley – SR, CE; (England) Jake Wingfield – LF, SR; (Australia) Shane Wright – SR	Head coach: (Australia) Kevin Walters; Assistant coach: (Wales) Ian Watson; Legend: (c) Captain(s); (vc) Vice-captain(s); (red card) = suspended; = injured; (gk) = Goal kicker

== 2027 transfers ==
=== Transfers In ===
Player	From	Contract	Date
(Australia) Solomona Faataape	Catalan Dragons	2 years	August 2026
(Tonga) Christian Tuipulotu	St George-Illawarra Dragons	3 years	September 2026
(Australia) Sean O'Sullivan	Canterbury Bankstown Bulldogs	1 year	September 2026
(Australia) Tom Starling	Canberra Raiders	3 years	October 2026
(England) Tom Forber	Wigan Warriors	3 years	November 2026
(England) Lukas Mason	Wigan Warriors		November 2026

=== Transfers Out ===
Player	To	Contract	Date
(New Zealand) Chris Matagi	Cronulla-Sutherland Sharks	1 year	August 2026
(France) Luca Walsh	Catalans Dragons	1 year	September 2026
(England) Leon Cowen	Halifax Panthers	1 year	October 2026
(England) Alfie Sinclair	Halifax Panthers	1 year	November 2026
(United Kingdom) Jackson Hastings			September 2026
(England) Cole Marsh			September 2026
(Papua New Guinea) Nene Macdonald			October 2026

=== Retired ===
Player	Date
(England) Jonny Lomax	August 2026
(England) Mark Percival	September 2026

== Players ==
=== Notable former players ===
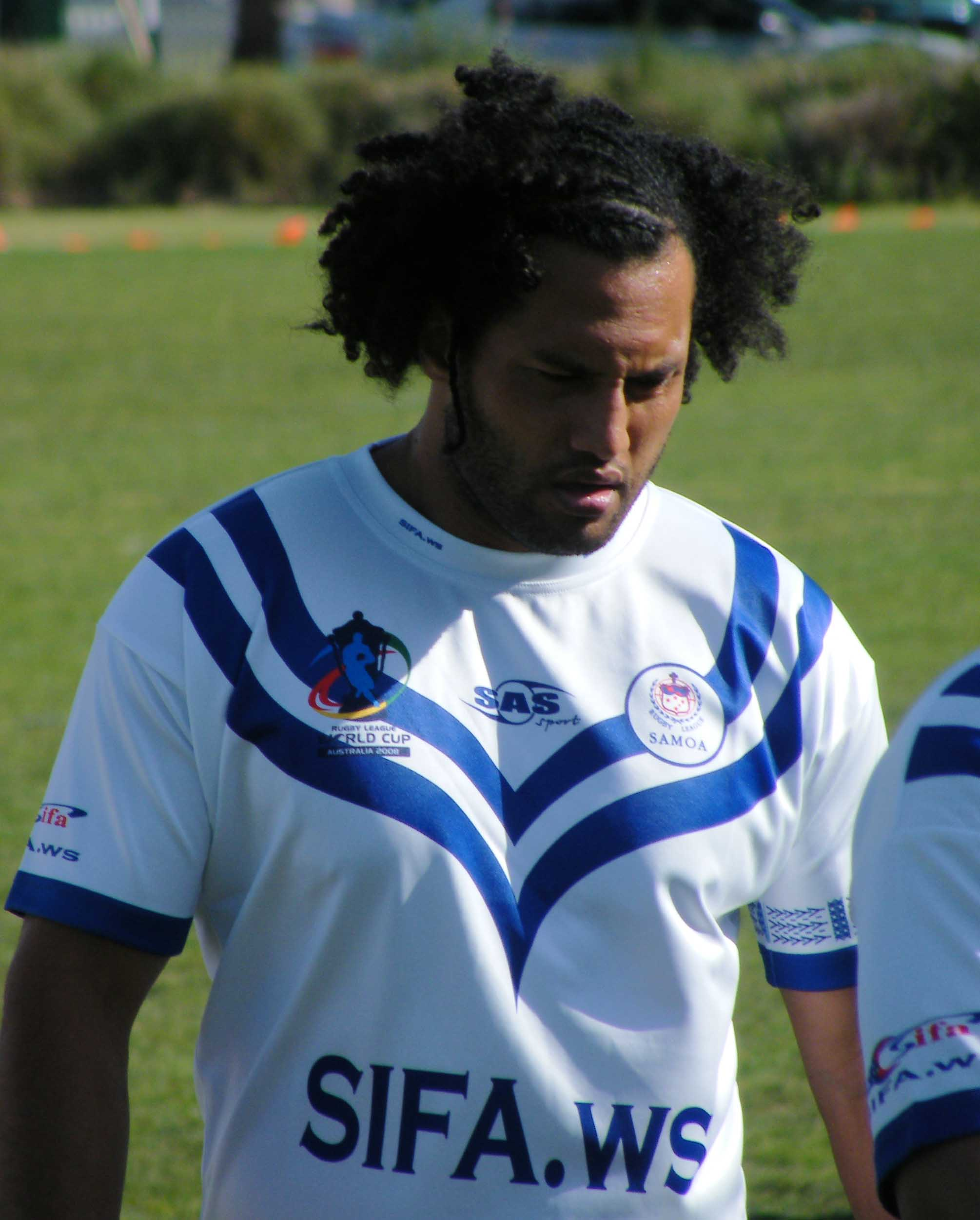
Francis Meli playing for Samoa whilst at St Helens

For all St Helens players with a Wikipedia article see List of St Helens RLFC past players. For all players who have gained international caps whilst playing for the club see List of St Helens RLFC international players.

==== Best ever 17 ====
Throughout 2010, a select panel of fans, journalists, former players and club officials voted for the best 17 players ever to have played for St Helens, to commemorate the club's 120th and final year at Knowsley Road.

No.

Position
Player

1 Kel Coslett – FB 2 Tom van Vollenhoven – WG 3 Doug Greenall – CE 4 Paul Newlove – CE 5 Darren Albert – WG 6 Les Fairclough – SO 7 Alex Murphy – SH 8 Alan Prescott – PR 9 Keiron Cunningham – HK 10 Cliff Watson – PR 11 Dick Huddart – SR 12 Chris Joynt – SR 13 Vince Karalius – LF 14 Sean Long – SH 15 George Nicholls – LF 16 Paul Sculthorpe – LF 17 Paul Wellens – FB

==== Players receiving testimonial matches ====
20 players have had benefit years or testimonials at St Helens, organised jointly by the club and the RFL. They honour ten years at the club, and the most recent player to receive one was loose forward Morgan Knowles in 2025.

== Coaches and board ==
=== Technical staff ===
Name	Job title
(Australia) Kevin Walters	Head Coach
(Wales) Ian Watson	Assistant Coach
N/A	Assistant Coach
(England) Matt Daniels	Head of Performance
(England) Nathan Mill	Head Physiotherapist
(England) Adam Daniels	Assistant Strength & Conditioning Coach
(England) Andrew Thompson	Physiotherapist
(England) Paul Johnson	Chaplain & Wellbeing Manager
(England) Sam Evans	Equipment & Kit Manager, and Training Steward
(England) JD Abram	Physiotherapist
(England) Darren Marsh	Strength & Conditioning Coach, and Nutritionist
(England) Scott Leyland	Performance Analyst
(England) Derek Jones	Masseur
(England) Simon Perritt	Club Doctor
(England) Steve Leonard	RL Development Manager
(England) Ian Talbot	Reserves Head Coach
(England) Gary Wheeler	Reserves Assistant Coach

=== Boardroom staff ===
Name	Job title
(England) Eamonn McManus	Chairman
(England) Joe Nicholl	Chief Operating Officer
(England) David Hutchinson	General Manager
(England) Mark Onion	Head of Marketing
(England) Vacant	Merchandising Manager
(England) Tom Maguire	Media & Content Manager

=== List of former head coaches ===
Since the end of World War II, St Helens have seen 28 new bosses at the helm at Knowsley Road. Currently, the position is held by Eamon O'Carroll. Kevin Walters signed a 3-year contract to be head coach beginning in the 2027 Super League season.

- Alf Frodsham 1945-49
- Peter Lyons 1949–52
- Jim Sullivan 1952-59
- Alan Prescott 1959–62
- Stan McCormick 1962-64
- Joe Coen 1964-67
- Cliff Evans 1967–70
- Jim Challinor 1970-74
- Eric Ashton 1974–80
- Kel Coslett 1980-82
- Billy Benyon 1982-85
- Alex Murphy 1985–90
- Mike McClennan 1990-93
- Eric Hughes 1994-96
- Shaun McRae 1996-98
- Ellery Hanley 1998–2000
- Ian Millward 2000-05
- Daniel Anderson 2005-08
- Mick Potter 2009–10
- Royce Simmons 2011–12
- Mike Rush (interim) 2012
- Nathan Brown 2013–14
- Keiron Cunningham 2015–17
- Jamahl Lolesi (interim) 2017
- Justin Holbrook 2017–19
- Kristian Woolf 2020–22
- Paul Wellens 2023–25
- Paul Rowley 2026
- Eamon O'Carroll (interim) 2026
- Kevin Walters 2027-2029

== Honours ==
=== Leagues ===
- First Division / Super League

Winners (17): 1931–32, 1952–53, 1958–59, 1965–66, 1969–70, 1970–71, 1974–75, 1996, 1999, 2000, 2002, 2006, 2014, 2019, 2020, 2021, 2022

League Leaders' Shield

Winners (8): 2005, 2006, 2007, 2008, 2014, 2018, 2019, 2022

Premiership

Winners (4): 1975–76, 1976–77, 1984–85, 1992–93

- RFL Lancashire League

Winners (9): 1929–30, 1931–32, 1952–53, 1959–60, 1964–65, 1965–66, 1966–67, 1968–69

- Western Division Championship

Winners (1): 1963–64

=== Cups ===
- Challenge Cup

Winners (13): 1955–56, 1960–61, 1965–66, 1971–72, 1975–76, 1996, 1997, 2001, 2004, 2006, 2007, 2008, 2021

- League Cup

Winners (1): 1987–88

- Charity Shield

Winners (1): 1992–93

- BBC2 Floodlit Trophy

Winners (2): 1971–72, 1975–76

- RFL Lancashire Cup

Winners (11): 1926–27, 1953–54, 1960–61, 1961–62, 1962–63, 1963–64, 1964–65, 1967–68, 1968–69, 1984–85, 1991–92

=== International ===
- World Club Challenge

Winners (3): 2001, 2007, 2023

== Records ==
=== Player records ===
==== Match records ====
- Most goals in a match: 16 by Paul Loughlin vs Carlisle, 14 September 1986.
- Most points in a match: 40 by Paul Loughlin vs Carlisle, 14 September 1986.
- Most tries in a match: 6 by all of the following:
  - Alf Ellaby vs Barrow, 5 March 1932.
  - Steve Llewellyn vs Castleford, 3 March 1956.
  - Steve Llewellyn vs Liverpool City, 20 August 1956.
  - Tom van Vollenhoven vs Wakefield Trinity, 21 December 1957.
  - Tom van Vollenhoven vs Blackpool Borough, 23 April 1962.
  - Frank Myler vs Maryport, 1 September 1969.
  - Shane Cooper vs Hull FC, 17 February 1988.

==== Season records ====
- Most tries in a season: 62 by Tom van Vollenhoven, 1958–59.
- Most goals in a season: 214 by Kel Coslett, 1971–72.
- Most points in a season: 452 by Kel Coslett, 1971–72.

==== Career records ====
- Most career tries: 392 Tom van Vollenhoven 1957–68 (third highest by any player).
- Most career points: 3,413 Kel Coslett 1961–76.
- Most career goals: 1,639 Kel Coslett 1961–76.
- Most career drop-goals: 73 Harry Pinner 1975–86.
- Most career appearances: 551 James Roby 2004–2023.

=== Team records ===
==== Points margins ====
- Highest score: 112–0 vs Carlisle, 14 September 1986.
- Greatest winning margin: 112 vs Carlisle, 14 September 1986.
- Heaviest defeat: 78–6 vs Warrington, 12 April 1909.
- Heaviest home defeat: 65–12 vs Wigan, 26 May 1997.
- Greatest losing margin: 72 vs Warrington, 12 April 1909.

==== Attendances ====
- Highest attendance: 35,695 vs Wigan, 26 December 1949.
- Highest Super League attendance: 18,098 vs Warrington, 26 August 1996.
- Highest Challenge Cup attendance: 30,276 vs Bradford Northern, 19 February 1949.
- Highest international tour match attendance: 29,156 vs Australia, 10 October 1959.

== See also ==
- History of St Helens R.F.C.
- List of St Helens R.F.C. coaches
- List of St Helens R.F.C. international players
- List of St Helens R.F.C. players
- List of St Helens R.F.C. seasons
- List of St Helens R.F.C. statistics and records
- St Helens R.F.C. Women
- St Helens R.F.C. Academy
- St Helens R.F.C. Hall of Fame

== Bibliography ==
- Service, Alex (June 2000). St Helens Rugby League. NPI Media Group. ISBN 978-0-7524-1883-4.
- St Helens Heritage Society and Service, Alex (September 2006). St Helens RLFC:100 Great Players. NPI Media Group. ISBN 0-7524-4079-9.
- Quirke and McCarthy, Andrew and Stephen (August 2001). Knowsley Road: Memories of St. Helens Rugby League Football Club. London League Publications Ltd. ISBN 1-903659-04-3.
