= List of St Helens R.F.C. statistics and records =

The following is a list of St Helens R.F.C.'s honours and records, both personal of individuals and of the team as a whole, that have been set over the 137-year history of the club.

== Team honours ==
=== Titles ===
| Title | Times Won | Year |
|---|---|---|
| Championship (Including Super League) | 17 times | 1931–1932, 1952–1953, 1958–1959, 1965–1966, 1969–1970, 1970–1971, 1974–1975, 1996, 1999, 2000, 2002, 2006, 2014, 2019, 2020, 2021, 2022 |
| Minor Premiers (Super League) | 8 times | 2002, 2005, 2006, 2007, 2008, 2014 2018, 2019 |
| Grand Finalists | 11 times | 1999, 2000, 2002, 2006, 2007, 2008, 2009, 2010, 2011, 2014, 2019 |
| Challenge Cup | 13 times | 1955–1956, 1960–1961, 1965–1966, 1971–1972, 1975–1976, 1996, 1997, 2001, 2004, 2006, 2007, 2008, 2021 |
| World Club Challenge | 3 times | 2001, 2007, 2023 |
| Premiership | 4 times | 1975–1976, 1976–1977, 1984–1985, 1992–1993 |
| Lancashire County Cup | 11 times | 1926–1927, 1953–1954, 1960–1961, 1961–1962, 1962–1963, 1963–1964, 1964–1965, 1967–1968, 1968–1969, 1984–1985, 1991–1992 |
| Lancashire League | 9 times | 1929–30, 1931–32, 1952–53, 1958–59, 1959–60, 1964–65, 1965–66, 1966–67, 1968–69 |
| John Player Trophy | 1 time | 1987–88 |

=== Biggest win ===
| Team | Score | Date |
|---|---|---|
| Carlisle | 112–0 | 14 September 1986 |

=== Heaviest defeat ===
| Team | Score | Date |
|---|---|---|
| Warrington | 6–78 | 12 April 1909 |

=== Largest Attendance ===
| Team | Attendance | Date |
|---|---|---|
| Wigan | 35,695 | 26 December 1949 |

=== Record attendance in Super League era ===
| Team | Attendance | Date |
|---|---|---|
| Warrington Wolves | 18,098 | 26 August 1996 |

== Player honours ==
=== Century of tries ===
Below is a list of players who have scored 100 or more tries for St Helens:

| | Name | Tries |
|---|---|---|
| (South Africa) | Tom van Vollenhoven | 392 |
| (England) | Leslie Jones | 283 |
| (England) | Alf Ellaby | 280 |
| (Wales) | Stewart Llewellyn | 239 |
| (England) | Paul Wellens | 231 |
| (Wales) | Roy Mathias | 218 |
| (England) | Anthony Sullivan | 213 |
| (England) | Alan Hunte | 189 |
| (England) | Doug Greenall | 188 |
| (Wales) | Frank Wilson | 175 |
| (Wales) | Keiron Cunningham | 175 |
| (England) | Alex Murphy | 175 |
| (New Zealand) | Roy Hardgrave | 173 |
| (England) | Adrian Gardner | 173 |
| (England) | Sean Long | 156 |
| (England) | William Benyon | 154 |
| (England) | Neil Holding | 145 |
| (New Zealand) (Samoa) | Francis Meli | 145 |
| (England) | Tommy Makinson | 135 |
| (England) | Paul Newlove | 134 |
| (England) | Frank Carlton | 129 |
| (Republic of Ireland) | Tommy Martyn | 127 |
| (Republic of Ireland) | Jimmy Flanagan | 125 |
| (England) | Chris Joynt | 121 |
| (England) | Peter Glynn | 118 |
| (South Africa) | Len Killeen | 115 |
| (England) | Roy Haggerty | 115 |
| (England) | Paul Sculthorpe | 113 |
| (England) | Barry Ledger | 112 |
| (England) | Jonny Lomax | 110 |
| (England) | William Briers | 109 |
| (England) | James Roby | 107 |

=== All-Time Records ===
Below are the all-time scoring and in-game records achieved by St Helens

==== Tries in a game ====
| Record & Player | Against | Date |
|---|---|---|
| 6 by: (Wales) Steve Llewellyn (twice) (England) Alf Ellaby (South Africa) Tom van Vollenhoven (twice) (England) Frank Myler (New Zealand) Shane Cooper | Bramley | 13 October 1906 |

==== Goals in a game ====
| Record & Player | Against | Date |
|---|---|---|
| 16 by (England) Paul Loughlin | Carlisle | 14 September 1986 |

==== Most points in a game ====
| Record & Player | Against | Date |
|---|---|---|
| 40 by (England) Paul Loughlin | Carlisle | 14 September 1986 |

==== Most tries in a season ====
| Player | Tries | Year |
|---|---|---|
| (South Africa) Tom van Vollenhoven | 62 | 1958–1959 |

==== Most goals in a season ====
| Player | Goals | Year |
|---|---|---|
| (Wales) Kel Coslett | 214 | 1971–1972 |

==== Most points in a season ====
| Player | Points | Year |
|---|---|---|
| (Wales) Kel Coslett | 452 | 1971–1972 |

==== Most career tries ====
| Player | Tries | Years |
|---|---|---|
| (South Africa) Tom van Vollenhoven | 392 | 1957–1968 |

==== Most career goals ====
| Player | Goals | Years |
|---|---|---|
| (Wales) Kel Coslett | 1,639 | 1961–1976 |

==== Most career points ====
| Player | Tries | Years |
|---|---|---|
| (Wales) Kel Coslett | 3,413 | 1961–1976 |

==== Most career appearances ====
| Player | Appearances | Years |
|---|---|---|
| (Wales) Kel Coslett | 531 (519 starts, 12 as a substitute) | 1961–1976 |

== List of coaches ==
| | Name | Contract Started | Contract Ended | Notes |
| (England) | Alf Frodsham | 1945 | 1949 | Sacked |
| (England) | Peter Lyons | 1949 | 1952 | Sacked |
| (England) | Jim Sullivan | 1952 | 1959 | Sacked |
| (England) | Alan Prescott | 1961 | 1962 | Sacked |
| (England) | Stan McCormick | 1962 | 1963 | Sacked |
| (England) | Joe Coan | 1963 | 1963 | Sacked |
| (England) | Cliff Evans | 1964 | 1971 | Sacked |
| (England) | John Challinor | 1971 | 1972 | Sacked |
| (England) | Eric Ashton | 1973 | 1975 | Sacked |
| (England) | Kel Coslett | 1975 | 1977 | Resigned due to ill health |
| (England) | William "Billy" Benyon | 1977 | 1985 | Contract expired |
| (England) | Alex Murphy | 1985 | 1989 | Resigned |
| (New Zealand) | Mike McClennan | 1989 | 1989 | Caretaker Role |
| (England) | Eric Hughes | 1989 | 1990 | Sacked |
|---|---|---|---|---|
| (Australia) | Shaun McRae | 1996 | 1998 | Contract expired, moved to Gateshead Thunder |
| (England) | Ellery Hanley | 1998 | 2000 | Sacked |
| (Australia) | Ian Millward | 2000 | 2005 | Sacked |
| (Australia) | Daniel Anderson | 2005 | 2008 | Contract expired, moved to Parramatta Eels |
| (Australia) | Mick Potter | 2009 | 2010 | Contract expired, moved to Bradford Bulls |
| (Australia) | Royce Simmons | 2011 | 2012 | Sacked |
| (Australia) | Nathan Brown | 2013 | 2014 | Contract expired |
| (England) | Keiron Cunningham | 2015 | 2017 | Sacked |
| (New Zealand) | Jamahl Lolesi | 2017 | 2017 | Caretaker |
| (Australia) | Justin Holbrook | 2017 | 2019 | Contract expired |
| (Australia) | Kristian Woolf | 2019 | 2022 | Contract expired, moved to Dolphins |
| (England) | Paul Wellens | 2022 | present | |
