= History of St Helens R.F.C. =

St Helens Rugby Football Club was established in 1873 as St Helens Football Club. They are a founder member of the Northern Rugby Football Union, after the Great Schism of 1895. They played in the first ever Challenge Cup Final in 1897 and have since been winners of the competition on 12 occasions. St Helens have played in the premier competition of rugby league, the Super League for each of its 14 seasons to date and have won the title on 5 occasions.

== Early years (1873—1945) ==
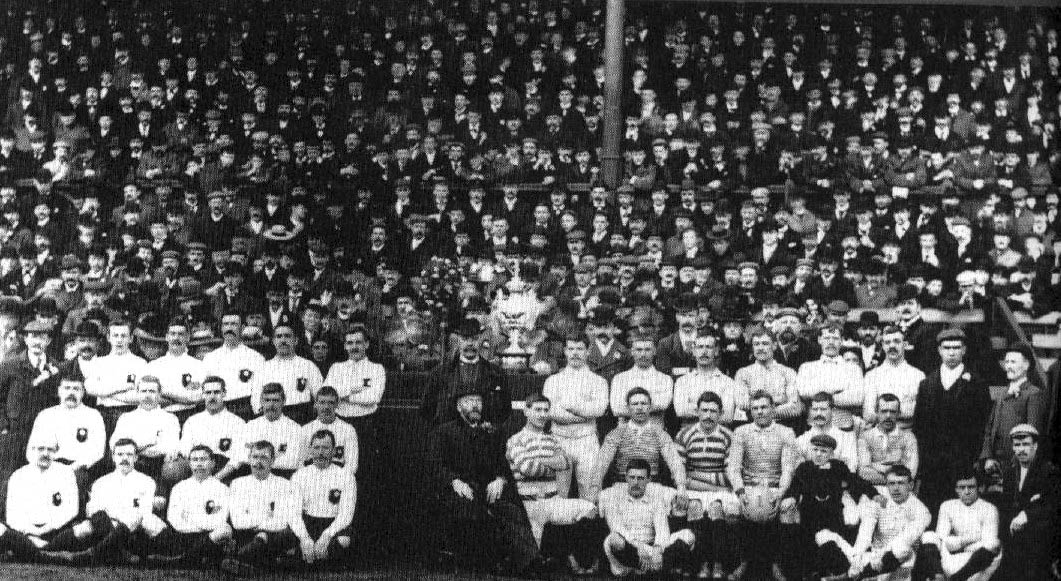
Saints are pictured in the first ever Challenge Cup Final, 1897: Batley (left) vs St Helens (right)

St Helens are one of the best members of the Rugby Football League. Founded on 19 November 1873 at the Fleece Hotel by William Douglas Herman, they played their first ever match on 24 January 1874 against Liverpool Royal Infirmary. The club moved from the St Helens Cricket Club Dentons Green Ground in 1890 where they had shared with St Helens Recs when neither were members of the Northern Rugby Football Union. They defeated Manchester Rangers in the first match played at Knowsley Road. In 1895, the club were one of 22 clubs that resigned from the Rugby Football Union and established the Northern Union. The first match of the new code was an 8–3 win at home to Rochdale Hornets before 3,000 spectators, Bob Doherty scoring St Helens' first try. They played in a vertically striped blue and white jersey—a stark contrast to the well known broad red band which would become the kit for the club later. The club reverted to this kit for one season during the rugby league centenary season in 1995.

The Rugby League Challenge Cup was launched in 1897 and it was St Helens who contested its first final with Batley, at Headingley, Leeds. The "Gallant Youths" of Batley emerged victorious 10–3, with Dave "Red" Traynor scoring the lone St Helens' try.

St Helens 1897 Challenge Cup Final team

8 Joe Thompson (PR)	9 William Winstanley (HK)	10 Steven Rimmer (PR)
11 Tom Winstanley (SR)	12 Tom Reynolds (SR)
14 Billy Briers (FL)	13 Peter Dale (LF)	15 Bill Whiteley (FL)
7 Freddie Little (SH)
6 Richard O'Hara (SO)
4 Jim Barnes (CE)
3 David Traynor (CE)
5 Billy Jacques (WG)	2 Bob Doherty (WG)
1 Tom Foulkes (FB)

Between 1887 and 1891, St Helens weren't successful, even generally considered a mid—table side. They finished second to bottom in the 1900—01 Lancashire League season, meaning they did not qualify to compete in the national league the year later. In the 1901–02 season, however, they did finish third in the Lancashire league. In 1902–03, the combined Lancashire and Yorkshire leagues saw St Helens enter for the first time. St Helens were placed in Division 1 but finished next to bottom and suffered relegation. Promotion was gained at the 1st attempt, only for another poor year to see them finish once again in a relegation position. However the two Divisions became one League to save the club from a 2nd relegation. The Champion fortunes that St Helens fans' greet today were certainly not apparent in this period, with the club finishing fourth to bottom in 1907, third to bottom in 1908, and consistently mid—table between 1909 and 1913.

On 14 June 1913, St Helens Recs joined the Northern Union after defecting from rugby union and association football. The Recs were based individually at the City Road ground, after previously sharing with St Helens, before their move to Knowsley Road, when neither played rugby league. The Recs played their first game on 6 September 1913. St Helens now had two professional rugby league teams. In both sides first year in co—existence, St Helens finished yet again in a disappointing low mid—table finish.

During the First World War, St Helens struggled to compete and failed to complete the full fixture list of the Emergency War League on two occasions, with the club finishing mid—table in the first year of the war, as well as being beaten by 37 points to 3 by Huddersfield in that year's Challenge Cup Final. The aftermath of the war was still taking its toll on national sport, not merely the clubs' ability to compete and complete fixtures, and in a shortened season, St Helens played only nine times in another trophyless season in 1918–1919. The club's lack of success and disappointing league finishes continued for another seven seasons.

The club defeated town rivals the Recs in the Lancashire Cup Final by 10 points to 2 in the 1926–27 season. The season after, they were trophyless, finishing 10th in a 28—team league. One year after the Challenge Cup's début at Wembley, St Helens reached the final there where they were defeated by 10 points to 3 by Widnes in 1930. They won their first ever National Championship in the 1931–32 season, defeating Huddersfield 9–5 in the final. This was the same season that they won their second Lancashire League, the first coming in the 1929–30 season. They lost the 1933 Lancashire Cup Final to Warrington, whilst finishing in no competitive position in the league once more. St Helens reached no finals or achieved any more honours during the remainder of the 1930s. Also, what appeared to be building as something of an inter—town derby between the two St Helens clubs was struck down as St Helens Recs played their last game on 29 April 1939, as, due to the economic depression, it was not possible for the town to sustain two teams.

Like during the First World War, the club could not enjoy having a full—time squad during World War II and struggled to compete. They did not compete in the National Championship until a 17 team Emergency War League was formed in the 1941–42 season, and did not win any regional honours. They finished bottom of the EWL in seasons 1942—43 and 1943—44 and next-to-bottom in 1944–45.

== Post war and the successful 1960s (1945—1996) ==
The club's fortunes that had seen them be successful so rarely the decade previous did not change in the 1940s. After the commitments of the Second World War, St Helens still found it hard to compete, and the trend of finishing as a mid—table side was once more apparent. The first two years of the 1950s, the last two years of Peter Lyons' reign, also ended trophyless.

The arrival of Jim Sullivan as head coach in 1952 heralded a successful era for St Helens, and helped to establish the club as a respected force in British and eventually world rugby league. In his seven-year tenure at the club, Sullivan took them to their first victory in the Challenge Cup Final (against Halifax in 1956), and two National Championships (in 1952—53 and 1958—59).

St Helens 1956 Challenge Cup winning team

8 Alan Prescott (PR)	9 Len McIntyre (HK)	10 Nat Silcock (PR)
11 George Parsons (SR)	12 Roy Robinson (SR)
13 Vince Karalius (LF)
7 Austin Rhodes (SH)
6 Bill Finnan (SO)
4 Brian Howard (CE)
3 Duggie Greenall (CE)
5 Frank Carlton (WG)	2 Steve Llewellyn (WG)
1 Glyn Moses (FB)

This was in addition to a brace of Lancashire Cups obtained in seasons 1953—54 and 1960–61, as well as three Lancashire Leagues, in 1952—53, 1956—57 and 1958—59. On Saturday 24 November 1956, St Helens inflicted a touring Australia its biggest ever defeat with a 44–2 win. Ex—St Helens captain and prop-forward Alan Prescott took over from Jim Sullivan as head coach in 1959.

The now synonymous red "vee" of St Helens—still used today—was first seen in the 1961 Challenge Cup Final.

Perhaps the golden era of the club came in the 1960s, as well as more lately in the Super League era. With a galaxy of stars including Tom van Vollenhoven, Alex Murphy, Dick Huddart and Vince Karalius, the 1960s was a decade of great success for the Saints. In Prescott's first season as coach he lifted the Lancashire League in the 1959–60 season. During this decade, the recognisable 'red vee' strip first appeared in 1961 for the final against Wigan. St Helens won this epic 12–6, and the kit has since become synonymous with the club. They won the Lancashire Cup in the 1961–62 season, with a 25—9 success over Swinton seeing yet more silverware com St Helens' way under the management of Prescott. After his departure in 1962, Stan McCormick led the club to retaining the Lancashire Cup in his first year, again beating Swinton; and St Helens made it a quadruplet of Lancashire Cup successes with wins against Leigh in 1964, and once more Swinton in 1965, this time under coach Joe Coan. The 1965 New Zealand tourists appeared at Knowsley Road on Wednesday 15 September. Saints inflicted a 28–7 defeat on their visitors, their biggest loss of the tour. A League and Cup double was achieved under Coan in the 1965–66 season, whilst they lost the Floodlit Trophy final against Castleford. St Helens were beaten by Wakefield Trinity in the 1967 Rugby Football League Championship Final at Station Road, Swinton on 10 May 1967 by 20 points to 9 in a replay, after a 7–7 draw 4 days earlier. This would be Coan's last year in charge at St Helens after a highly successful period as boss. He was replaced by Cliff Evans.

Evans' first full season in charge at the club saw him win the club's eighth Lancashire Cup in 1968; winning 13–10 against Warrington after a replay. St Helens retained the Lancashire Cup the year later, whilst also winning the Lancashire League for being the highest placed Lancashire side in the National standings, and they also reached the final of the Floodlit Trophy that season, where they were beaten 7–4 by Wigan. The 1969–70 season would be the year that Evans would leave his post, but not without winning a National Championship, beating Leeds in the final after finishing third overall.

The 1970s were also seen as a successful spell for St Helens, as they reached three Challenge Cup finals in the period. John Challinor took over from Cliff Evans in 1970, and in his first season, he won the Championship, and reached two finals, the Lancashire Cup and Floodlit Trophy, losing both. In this season, a European Championship—not dissimilar to today's World Club Challenge—was contested between St Helens and French champions St Gaudens. Over a two—legged game, St Helens won 92–11 on aggregate. In their first Challenge Cup Final of the 1970s, they defeated Leeds in 1972 16–13, in addition to winning their first Floodlit Trophy, after losing out in the final three times before, with an 8–2 win over Rochdale. No success was achieved in seasons 1972—73 and 1973–74, with St Helens finishing third and second in the respective years. This could be a possible reason for Challinor's replacement with Eric Ashton as head coach. In Ashton's first season in charge, St Helens won the Championship, and contested the inaugural Premiership final, losing 26–11 to Leeds. They repeated their first Challenge Cup success of the 1970s three years after the first against Widnes in 1976 where they were victorious by 20–5 in the famous 'Dads Army' final. They also won the Premiership against Salford, and the Floodlit Trophy against Dewsbury in a successful season. In the same year, St Helens lost to Eastern Suburbs in an unofficial World Club Challenge Final by 25 points to 2. The club won the Premiership in 1977, but, on 13 December 1977, Saints lost 26–11 to Hull Kingston Rovers in the final of the BBC2 Floodlit Trophy. In 1978, Leeds avenged their 1972 loss against St Helens, emerging winners by 14–12. St Helens lost the Floodlit Trophy in the 1978–79 season, going down to Widnes. The 1979–80 season was unsuccessful, with St Helens finishing mid—table. Eric Ashton left the club after this disappointing year.

Club legend and Welsh international Kel Coslett took over as coach in June 1980. However, his spell as coach was not nearly as successful as his spell as a player, and St Helens won nothing whilst under Coslett's command, finishing mid—table in both seasons. He held the post for two years before handing over to Billy Benyon. Not in—keeping with several of his predecessors, Benyon did not enjoy any success in his maiden season as St Helens coach; losing the Lancashire Cup final of that year to Warrington. Nothing was won in the 1983–84 season, but Saints won back the Lancashire Cup, with a 26–18 win at Wigan in the 1984–85 season. They also won the Premiership in the same season with a 36–16 victory over defending champions Hull Kingston Rovers. In Benyon's last season as coach, 1985–86, nothing was won.

The arrival of Alex Murphy as coach in 1986 produced some colourful displays from a team that was widely regarded as an entertaining team to watch, but seemed to be constant runners—up. This was illustrated by the shock defeat by Halifax in the Challenge Cup final at Wembley 19–18 in 1987. Success was achieved in 1988 when St Helens lifted their one and only John Player Trophy with a thrilling 15–14 victory over Leeds in January 1988, at Central Park, Wigan. Neil Holding with the crucial, match—winning drop—goal. They, however, lost to Widnes in the Premiership Final at Old Trafford at the end of the season, further showing this teams ability to get to finals and not be able to compete on the best stage. Nothing was achieved in the next season, and Murphy stood down as coach.

Murphy was succeeded by Mike McClennan in February 1990. In his first season, McClennan took St Helens to the 1991 Challenge Cup Final, where they were defeated by 13 points to 8 by Wigan. They won the Lancashire Cup, in the 1991–92 season, beating Rochdale Hornets. They also lost the Premiership Final that season, losing to Wigan. In 1993 the club avenged their defeat by Wigan the season previous to win the Premiership, in the same season that they won the Charity Shield, and lost the Lancashire Cup final. McClennan was head coach until December 1993, when Eric Hughes succeeded him as head coach in 1994. Under Hughes, St Helens only reached the one, Regal Trophy Final, where they lost to Wigan in 1996 by 25 to 16. They finished fourth in both of Hughes' seasons in charge. The lack of trophies in the St Helens cabinet, after the club had suddenly become so accustomed to success, would need to change in the "new" brand Super League that formed in 1996; hence Hughes' departure in 1996 and replacement with Australian Shaun McRae.

== Summer era ==
Following on from their constant ambition for successes, first experienced in the sixties, Saints became one of the most successful side of the summer era. Since the inception of Super League in 1996, they have won the title on five occasions, and have added seven Challenge Cups to their five previous successes. Indeed, they won the inaugural Super League, albeit by finishing top of the league before the play-off era. St Helens defeated Bradford 8–6 in the 1999 Super League Grand Final, their first Grand Final, with more than 50,000 people witnessing Chris Joynt lift the trophy at Old Trafford. They also won the World Club Challenge in 2001 and 2007, beating Brisbane both times.

=== Late 1990s ===
The success of the Saints in Super League began under the leadership of Shaun McRae in 1996. During his tenure the club won one league title (1996), a year in which he was named Super League's coach of the year, and enjoyed back—to—back successes over Bradford in the Challenge Cup (1996 and 1997).1998 proved to be a trophyless year, and Ellery Hanley succeeded McRae in 1999, after the Australian left for new Super League side Gateshead. Hanley led Saints to Grand Final success against Bradford in October of his first year in charge. Hanley was considered by some to be a polarising figure and after several acrimonious disagreements with the St Helens board of directors, he was sacked a month into the following season. Ian Millward was appointed as Hanley's successor as head coach.

=== 2000s ===
==== Millward's reign and a controversial sacking (2000—2005) ====
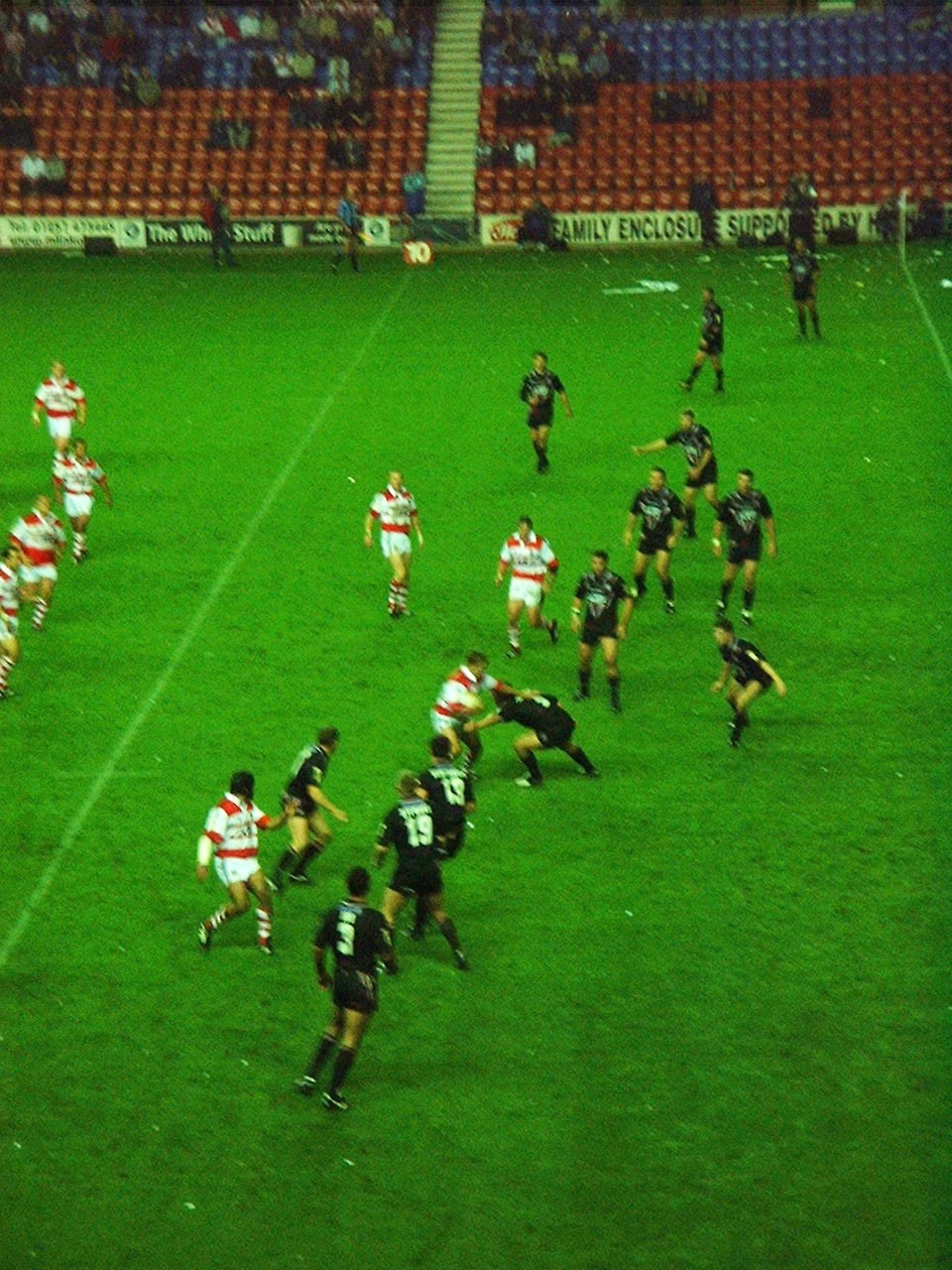
Saints defeat Wigan in the 2000 Super League Grand Final

Under Millward, St Helens quickly became the most exciting team in the competition, playing expansive, attacking rugby. He saw them soundly beaten in the 2000 World Club Challenge, losing 44–6 to Melbourne, but lead them to retaining their Super League title in 2000 beating Wigan 29–16. They also won the 2001 Challenge Cup Final 13–6 over Bradford, with the final held at Twickenham Stadium for the first time, and the 2001 World Club Challenge, earning a 20–18 win over the Broncos. Millward then lead Saints to reclaim the Super League title in the 2002 Grand Final, Sean Long snatching a last minute 19–18 win over the Bradford with a drop—goal. They were hammered in the 2003 World Club Challenge by Sydney by 38 points to 0. In this season, they failed to win a trophy after being knocked out of the Challenge Cup by Leeds at the semi—final stage, and the Super League play—offs by Wigan at the same stage. In 2004 they beat arch—rivals Wigan 32–16 at the Millennium Stadium, Cardiff in front of a capacity crowd of 73,734 people to win the Challenge Cup, Long gaining his second of an eventual three Lance Todd Trophies.

Millward's reign was not without controversy and his St Helens career ended controversially after he was suspended in May 2005. He was sacked for gross misconduct a week later. Daniel Anderson was appointed as coach, Millward was then made coach of arch rivals Wigan. The St Helens faithful largely saw this sacking as unfair and as a step backwards for the club. However, if these fans could have foreseen what was to follow under Anderson then they would have certainly wanted him hired sooner.

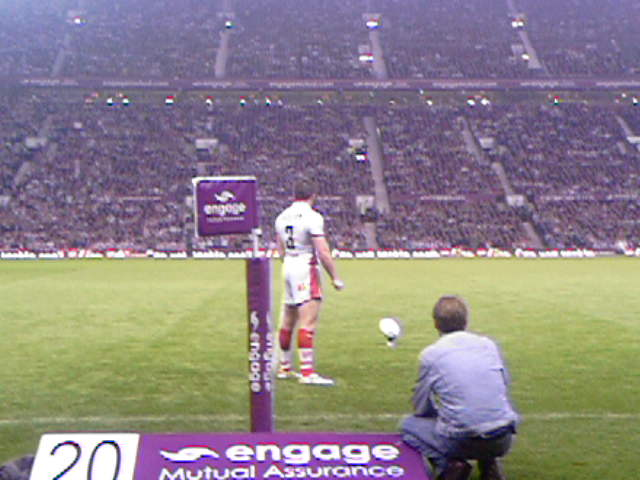
Jamie Lyon preparing to kick at goal for St Helens in the 2006 Super League Grand Final

==== The Anderson era (2005—2009) ====
Daniel Anderson saw his new team become the first team to top the Super League and fail to reach Old Trafford in 2005. However, St Helens won the Powergen 2006 Challenge Cup Final at Twickenham Stadium, London on Saturday 26 August 2006, beating Huddersfield 42–12. This was their second Challenge Cup victory at Twickenham stadium, the first occasion being in 2001. St Helens scrum-half Sean Long was awarded the Lance Todd trophy for the man—of—the—match performance during the 2006 Challenge Cup Final and in doing so became the first ever player to win a third Lance Todd trophy. These added to the awards he won in 2001 and 2004.

St Helens followed up their Challenge Cup win by claiming the League Leader's Shield, before cementing their reputation as the team of the year by defeating Hull 26 points to 4 in the Super League Grand Final. Once more St Helens confirmed their status as the outstanding team of the summer era. Additionally, Paul Wellens received the Man of Steel Award for the 2006 season.

In December 2006, St Helens were awarded with the BBC Sports Personality of the Year Team Award at the Annual BBC Sports Personality of the Year Ceremony. This accolade recognises the best team in any sport within the United Kingdom. At the same ceremony Daniel Anderson was given the BBC Sports Personality of the Year Coach Award – this was the first time a rugby league coach had won the award.

After a slow start to the 2007 season, Saints added to their history by beating Brisbane 18–14 to win the 2007 World Club Challenge.

St Helens 2007 World Club Championship winning team

8 Nick Fozzard (PR)	9 James Roby (HK)	10 Jason Cayless (PR)
11 Lee Gilmour (SR)	12 Mike Bennett (SR)
13 Jon Wilkin (LF)
7 Sean Long (SH)
6 Leon Pryce (SO)
4 Willie Talau (CE)
3 Matt Gidley (CE)
5 Francis Meli (WG)	2 Ade Gardner (WG)
1 Paul Wellens (FB)
Substitutes
14 Keiron Cunningham (HK)
15 Bryn Hargreaves (PR)
16 Paul Sculthorpe (LF)
17 James Graham (PR)

In July, they beat Super League rivals, Bradford, to reach the first Challenge Cup final at the new Wembley Stadium. Here, St Helens successfully defended their Challenge Cup by defeating Catalans Dragons 30–8 in the final on 25 August 2007. They were beaten in the Grand Final that year by Leeds by 33 points to 6, despite finishing at the top of the league ladder for the third successive season. James Roby, however, became the second St Helens player, and home—grown talent in two years to win the Man of Steel Award.

Saints success in the Challenge Cup continued in 2008 with a victory at the new Wembley Stadium, this time defeating Hull F.C. 28–16. Paul Wellens received the Lance Todd Trophy after sharing the award with teammate Leon Pryce the year earlier.

They also achieved first place again in the 2008 Super League season – for the 4th year running – winning the League Leaders Shield, and beat Leeds 38-10 for the right to go to Old Trafford to contest the grand final. However, St. Helens were once again defeated by Leeds in the Grand Final, by a margin of 24 to 16, on 4 October 2008. James Graham, on a positive note, made it a hat—trick of ex—Blackbrook Royals to win the Man of Steel Award whilst playing for St Helens. This would be Anderson's last game in charge of the club, as he announced he was to return to Australia and the Parramatta Eels of the NRL. St Helens fans and players alike were saddened to see Anderson leave, after not only upholding the tradition of St Helens exciting brand of rugby, but giving them a defensive and disciplined edge that was never apparent under Ian Millward. His personality and relationship with the fans was an additional reason why St Helens fans were disgruntled in him leaving after four years in charge and why next boss Mick Potter faced a fair amount of criticism in his initial period as boss.

==== The Potter years (2009—2010) ====
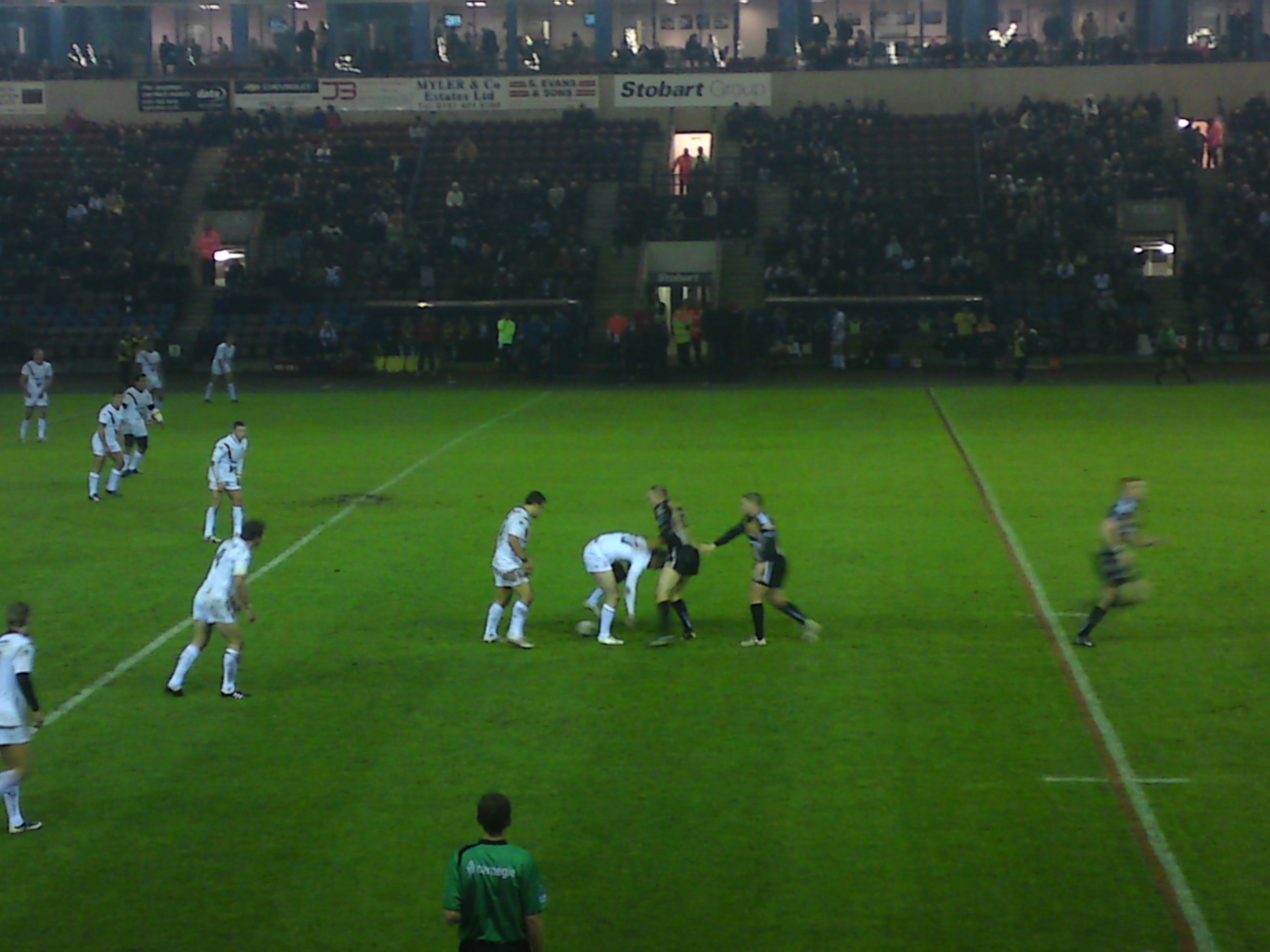
St Helens against Widnes Vikings in the pre-season 2010 Karalius Cup

Mick Potter was announced as the successor to Anderson, which received a number of plaudits from the St Helens fans and the European game as a whole, as the year previous he had led Catalans Dragons to a record—high third—placed finish in the league. On 9 August 2009, St Helens reached a record 9th consecutive Challenge Cup semi—final, where they were beaten by 24 points to 14 by Huddersfield. This prevented Saints from reaching the final at the new Wembley Stadium for a third successive time and from winning the cup for a fourth time running. This defeat naturally came as a shock to the St Helens faithful, after so often in the last 15 years seeing the team reach the pinnacle of this competition and go on to win the cup. It was from here that the criticism began, and questions were raised particularly of his tactics and his activity (or lack of) in the transfer market.

On 3 October 2009, Saints defeated fierce rivals Wigan to book their place at a fourth consecutive Super League Grand Final, only to lose out to Leeds in the final, 18–10, making Leeds the only team to win the grand final three times consecutively. A 20—year—old Kyle Eastmond scored all of Saints' points. A trophyless year for the first time since 2003 was another catalyst to Potter's critics abusing and slating his appointment, with even rumours of rifts within the changing rooms.

=== 2010s ===
2010 was the year that saw Potter surrender to his critics and leave St Helens. Criticisms from club legends like Paul Sculthorpe and Sean Long regarding his personal skills with the fans, as well as the continued fan rejection saw him let his contract run out and, initially, seek a job in the NRL, but eventually, and perhaps surprisingly, join Bradford on a two—year contract. Names like Royce Simmons, Mal Meninga, and assistant coach Kieron Purtill, were linked with the job for 2011. Simmons was the chosen man for the job, as announced on 22 July 2010. The 2010 season would also see hooker and captain Keiron Cunningham retire from the game after 17 years with his one and only club. However, Cunningham would not be leaving without leaving a lasting legacy on the club. A lifelike bronze statue of Cunningham was built and placed on display in the town, before being transported to the club's new stadium upon its construction in 2012. He would additionally take up a coaching role with the academy, as well as a strength and conditioning role with the first team. In light of these decisions, neither Cunningham nor Potter halted their personal and the St Helens team quest for success; shown by their 10th successive semi—final appearance in the Challenge Cup. However, Saints failure to perform on the big stage was once more shown, going down in this semi—final by 32–28. Defeating Huddersfield in the qualifying semi—final in the 2010 play-off series by 42–22 not only saw Saints qualify for their fifth Grand Final in five years, but also saw the final ever game to be played at Knowsley Road. Cunningham snatched the final ever try at the famous old ground in typical fashion from dummy—half. However, for the fourth year running, St Helens once more proved flops in the Grand Final. One of the finest finals of the Super League era was anticipated, but the flamboyant Saints that the fans saw so rarely under Potter once more failed to materialise, and, in front of a near sell—out crowd of 71,526, they fell to a 22–10 loss to rivals Wigan. It was not the romantic finish to the Saints careers of Potter, Cunningham or any of the departing members of the squad that some had hoped for, but nevertheless, a new era was just around the corner, as Simmons' reign began.

==== A new era begins (2010–present) ====
Australian Royce Simmons took over from compatriot Mick Potter at the end of the 2010 season. His reign began in a positive sense, certainly in the eyes of the Saints faithful in comparison to Potter, and in terms of market activity, with several key personnel departing from and arriving at the club. The club itself also underwent something of a revolution. The 2011 season was the year St Helens left Knowsley Road, lost their long-standing captain and hooker Keiron Cunningham to retirement and re—branded unofficially to Saints RL, as well as welcoming new coach Simmons.

== Kit history ==
St Helens heritage jersey—first used in 1890, used again in 2010

In their rugby football days and early years as a rugby league club, St Helens wore a vertically striped blue and white jersey with blue shorts and socks. This kit was reverted to by Saints during their centenary year in 1995. In their initial period at Knowsley Road, St Helens wore a similar jersey, but the stripes were horizontal, and the colours blue and grey. In 2010, the club used this design as a commemorative strip, to celebrate their 110th and final year at the ground. These colours however were dropped in favour of a more traditional to today, red and white design. The kit entailed a thick red horizontal strip, with a white background, and was used until 1961. In the 1961 Challenge Cup final against Wigan, the strip still seen today—the famous red vee—was first utilised.

very early kit
kit until 1961
1961–present
