= List of St Helens R.F.C. coaches =

This list of St Helens R.F.C. coaches details the records and achievements of coaches at the club.

St. Helens Rugby Football Club currently play in the Super League, a rugby league football competition.

== Coaches ==
This list shows the coaches at Knowsley Road since 1945.

Win percentage is rounded to one decimal place. The names of any caretaker coaches are supplied where known, and these periods are highlighted in italics.

Key

M: Matches played W: Matches won D: Matches drawn L: Matches lost

Name	From	To	M	W	D	L	Win%	Honours and achievements	Notes
Alfred Frodsham	1945	1949							
Peter Lyons	1949	1950							
Emlyn Jenkins	1950	1952							
Jim Sullivan	1952	1959							
Alan Prescott	1959	1962							
Stan McCormick	1962	1964							
Joe Coan	1964	1967							
Cliff Evans	1967	1970							
Jim Challinor	1970	1974						Challenge Cup: 1972	
Eric Ashton	May 1974	May 1980							
Kel Coslett	June 1980	May 1982							
Billy Benyon	May 1982	November 1985							
Alex Murphy	November 1985	January 1990	167	107	5	55	64		
Mike McClennan	February 1990	December 1993							
Eric Hughes	January 1994	January 1996	78	45	3	30	58		
Shaun McRae	January 1996	October 1998	70	50	2	18	71	Challenge Cup: 1996, 1997	
Ellery Hanley	December 1998	March 2000	34	26	0	8	76		
Ian Millward	March 2000	May 2005	95	71	2	22	75	Championship: 2000, 2002; Challenge Cup: 2001, 2004	
Daniel Anderson	May 2005	October 2008	77	57	0	20	74	World Club Challenge: 2007; Championship: 2006; League Leader's Shield:2005, 2006, 2007, 2008; Challenge Cup: 2006, 2007, 2008	
Mick Potter	February 2009	October 2010	68	49	0	19	72		
Royce Simmons	February 2011	March 2012	41	24	4	13	59		
Mike Rush (Acting)	March 2012	October 2012							
Nathan Brown	October 2012	October 2014	62	39	1	22	63	Championship: 2014; League Leader's Shield:2014	
Keiron Cunningham	October 2015	October 2017	74	43	1	30	58		
Jamahl Lolesi (Caretaker)	2017	2017							
Justin Holbrook	2017	October 2019	87	70	0	17	80	Championship: 2019; League Leader's Shield:2018, 2019	
Kristian Woolf	2019	2022	14	10	0	4	71	Championship: 2020, 2021, 2022; Challenge Cup: 2021	
Paul Wellens	2023	October 2025	95	60	0	35	63		
Paul Rowley	October 2025	July 2026	0	0	0	0	0		
Eamon O’Carroll (Interim)	July 2026	Present							
