= Robert Doherty (rugby league) =

English rugby league footballer (1870-1942)

Bob Doherty
Personal information
- Full name: Robert Doherty
- Born: 12 February 1870; Kendal, England
- Died: 19 December 1942 (aged 72)

Playing information
- Height: 5 ft 4 in (1.63 m)
- Weight: 10 st 6 lb (66 kg; 146 lb)
- Position: Wing, Centre
Club
Years	Team	Pld	T	G	FG	P
	Kendal Hornets
1895–03	St. Helens	224	38	0	0	114
	Total	224	38	0	0	114
Representative
Years	Team	Pld	T	G	FG	P
1895	Lancashire	1	0	0	0	0

Robert Doherty (12 February 1870 – 19 December 1942) was an English rugby league footballer for the St. Helens club in the English Championship competition. He played as a three-quarter back.

Doherty played in the first Challenge Cup final for St Helens on the wing.
