= 1997 Wigan Warriors season =

- Super League II Rank: 4th
- Play-off result: Won Premiership Final
- Challenge Cup: 4th round
- 1997 record: Wins: 14; draws: 0; losses: 8
- Points scored: For: 683; against: 398

Team information
- Stadium: Central Park
← 1996	List of seasons	1998 →

The 1997 Wigan Warriors season was the 102nd season in the club's rugby league history and the second season in the Super League. Coached by Eric Hughes, the Warriors competed in Super League II and finished in 4th place, but went on to win the Premiership Final at Old Trafford against St. Helens. The club also competed in the 1997 Challenge Cup, and were knocked out in the fourth round by St Helens.

== Background ==
The inaugural Super League season in 1996 was a disappointing year for Wigan. Although they finished the year with a victory in the 1996 Premiership final, the club ended the league season as runners-up to rivals St Helens, the first time since 1989 that they had failed to win the league, and their nine-year unbeaten run in the Challenge Cup had come to an end. From the start of the 1997 season, the club became known as Wigan Warriors.

The club was struggling with financial problems, and was reportedly over £3 million in debt. Dave Whelan, owner of the town's football club Wigan Athletic, had offered to buy the rugby club's ground, Central Park, which would be redeveloped into an all-seater stadium and shared by both clubs. In January 1997, Wigan Warriors' shareholders voted in favour of accepting the offer, but two months later the board instead decided to sell the ground to Tesco, who had offered considerably more money than Whelan, and the club intended to share the newly built Reebok Stadium with Bolton Wanderers until it could build its own new stadium. The decision led to the departure of director John Martin, who had backed Whelan's proposal. The shareholders, unhappy that the club was being moved out of town, demanded the resignation of two of the club's board members, Jack Robinson and Tom Rathbone. Following months of continuous protests by shareholders and supporters, Robinson and Rathbone resigned in August, with Arthur Thomas taking over as chairman. Thomas resigned in October, and the club was taken over by Mike Nolan, a local businessman and former rugby league player with Rochdale Hornets and St Helens. The plan to move in with Bolton Wanderers was dropped, and the club announced they would share a proposed new stadium at Robin Park with Wigan Athletic as of the start of the 2000 season.

Prior to the start of the league season, The Independent wrote that Wigan's squad was "thin on genuine quality", and predicted that the team would finish third.

== Match results ==
=== Challenge Cup ===
Wigan were drawn against St Helens in the fourth round of the Challenge Cup. Wigan lost 12–26 against their local rivals, with the result eventually leading to the departure of coach Graeme West a week later.

Round	Date	Opponent	Venue	Score	Tries	Goals	Attendance
Fourth	8 February 1997	St Helens	Away	12–26	Radlinski	Farrell (4)	12,262

=== World Club Championship ===
Wigan were in Pool A for the 1997 World Club Championship.

Group stage

Game	Date	Opponent	Venue	Score	Tries	Goals	Attendance
1	9 June 1997	Canterbury Bulldogs	Away	22–18	Robinson (2), Haughton, A. Johnson	Farrell (2), Paul	10,680
2	16 June 1997	Brisbane Broncos	Away	0–34			14,833
3	22 June 1997	Canberra Raiders	Away	22–56	Radlinski (2), Connolly, Hall	Farrell (3)	9,098
4	20 July 1997	Brisbane Broncos	Home	4–30		Farrell (2)	13,476
5	28 July 1997	Canterbury Bulldogs	Home	31–24	Connolly, Cowie, Farrell, Radlinski, Robinson	Farrell (5, 1dg)	10,280
6	3 August 1997	Canberra Raiders	Home	10–50	Haughton	Farrell (3)	12,504

Knockout stage

Round	Date	Opponent	Venue	Score	Tries	Goals	Attendance
Quarter-final	3 October 1997	Hunter Mariners	Home	18–22	Ellison (2), Radlinski	Farrell (3)	9,553

== Table ==
Pos	Team	Pld	W	D	L	PF	PA	PD	Pts	Relegation
1	Bradford Bulls (C)	22	20	0	2	769	397	+372	40	
2	London Broncos	22	15	3	4	616	418	+198	33	
3	St Helens	22	14	1	7	592	506	+86	29	
4	Wigan	22	14	0	8	683	398	+285	28	
5	Leeds Rhinos	22	13	1	8	544	463	+81	27	
6	Salford Reds	22	11	0	11	428	495	−67	22	
7	Halifax Blue Sox	22	8	2	12	524	549	−25	18	
8	Sheffield Eagles	22	9	0	13	415	574	−159	18	
9	Warrington Wolves	22	8	0	14	437	647	−210	16	
10	Castleford Tigers	22	5	2	15	334	515	−181	12	
11	Paris Saint-Germain	22	6	0	16	362	572	−210	12	
12	Oldham Bears (R)	22	4	1	17	461	631	−170	9	Relegated to Division One

Source: Rugby League Project
Rules for classification: 1) Points; 2) Points difference; 3) Number of points scored;
(C) Champions; (R) Relegated

== Squad ==
Players marked * left the club during the season.

No	Player	Apps	Tries	Goals	DGs	Points
1	Kris Radlinski	33	15	0	0	60
2	Jason Robinson	31	20	0	0	80
3	Va'aiga Tuigamala *	1	0	0	0	0
4	Gary Connolly	28	15	0	0	60
5	Rob Smyth	0	0	0	0	0
6	Henry Paul	27	7	4	0	36
7	Shaun Edwards *	1	0	0	0	0
8	Neil Cowie	27	2	0	0	8
9	Mick Cassidy	33	2	0	0	8
10	Terry O'Connor	28	1	0	0	4
11	Simon Haughton	31	15	0	0	60
13	Andy Farrell	33	9	146	4	332
14	Craig Murdock	18	4	0	0	16
15	Andy Johnson	31	16	0	0	64
16	Danny Ellison	12	10	0	0	40
17	Stephen Holgate	31	0	0	0	0
18	Stuart Lester	8	0	0	0	0
20	Nigel Wright	14	2	0	1	9
21	Daryl Cardiss	16	3	0	0	12
22	Paul Johnson	10	2	0	0	8
23	Ian Sherratt	0	0	0	0	0
24	Sean Long *	4	0	0	0	0
25	Gaël Tallec	28	3	0	0	12
26	Doc Murray	8	0	0	0	0
27	Martin Hall	18	2	1	0	10
28	Paul Koloi	5	1	0	0	4
29	Lee Hansen	25	0	0	0	0
30	Tony Smith	23	16	0	0	64
31	Ian Talbot	3	1	0	0	4
32	Neil Baynes	2	0	0	0	0
33	Lee Gilmour	1	0	0	0	0
34	Jon Clarke	9	1	0	0	4

== Transfers ==
In

Player	Pos	From	Fee	Date
Tony Smith	Scrum half	Castleford Tigers	£150,000	March 1997
Lee Hansen	Prop forward	Widnes Vikings	Exchange	April 1997
Paul Koloi	Centre	Canterbury Cardinals		May 1997
Denis Betts	Second-row	Auckland Warriors		May 1997
Tony Mestrov	Prop forward	London Broncos		November 1997
Mark Bell	Winger	St. George Dragons		November 1997
Robbie McCormack	Hooker	Hunter Mariners		November 1997
Danny Moore	Centre	Manly-Warringah Sea Eagles		December 1997

Out

Player	Pos	To	Fee	Date
Kelvin Skerrett	Prop forward	Halifax	Free	January 1997
Va'aiga Tuigamala	Centre	Newcastle Falcons (RU)	£500,000	February 1997
Shaun Edwards	Scrum half	London Broncos	Undisclosed	March 1997
Sean Long	Scrum half	Widnes Vikings	Exchange	April 1997
Matthew Knowles		Widnes Vikings	Exchange	April 1997
