= 1996 Wigan RLFC season =

- Super League I Rank: 2nd
- Play-off result: Won Premiership Final
- Challenge Cup: 5th round
- 1996 record: Wins: 19; draws: 1; losses: 2
- Points scored: For: 902; against: 326

Team information
- Chairman: Jack Robinson
- Head Coach: Graeme West
- Captain: Shaun Edwards Andy Farrell
- Stadium: Central Park
← 1995–96	List of seasons	1997 →

The 1996 Wigan season was the 101st season in the club's rugby league history and the first season in the newly formed Super League. Coached by Graeme West and captained by Shaun Edwards, Wigan competed in Super League I and finished in 2nd place, but went on to win the Premiership Final at Old Trafford against St. Helens. The club also competed in the 1996 Challenge Cup, but were knocked out in the fifth round by First Division side Salford Reds, and was the first time the club had failed to win the trophy since 1987.

In July 1996 Farrell was appointed Wigan's captain.

== Background ==
The 1995–96 season was a shortened transitional season ahead of the switch to the Super League, which would see the league become a summer competition. Wigan won the league championship for the seventh consecutive season, and also won the final staging of the League Cup, defeating St Helens 25–16. Wigan's dominance was expected to continue in the summer era, and the club were odds-on favourites to win the inaugural Super League.

== Table ==
Super League I
Pos	Team	Pld	W	D	L	PF	PA	PD	Pts	Qualification or relegation
1	St Helens (C)	22	20	0	2	950	455	+495	40	Qualified for Premiership semi final
2	Wigan	22	19	1	2	902	326	+576	39	Qualified for Premiership semi final
3	Bradford Bulls	22	17	0	5	767	409	+358	34	Qualified for Premiership semi final
4	London Broncos	22	12	1	9	611	462	+149	25	Qualified for Premiership semi final
5	Warrington Wolves	22	12	0	10	569	565	+4	24	
6	Halifax Blue Sox	22	10	1	11	667	576	+91	21	
7	Sheffield Eagles	22	10	0	12	599	730	−131	20	
8	Oldham Bears	22	9	1	12	473	681	−208	19	
9	Castleford Tigers	22	9	0	13	548	599	−51	18	
10	Leeds	22	6	0	16	555	745	−190	12	
11	Paris Saint-Germain	22	3	1	18	398	795	−397	7	
12	Workington Town (R)	22	2	1	19	325	1021	−696	5	Relegated to Division One

Source: Rugby League Project
Rules for classification: 1) Points; 2) Points difference; 3) Number of points scored;
(C) Champions; (R) Relegated

== Match results ==
Win	Draw	Loss

=== Super League ===
Date	Opponent	Venue	Score	Tries	Goals	Attendance
30 March 1996	Oldham Bears	Away	56–16	Connolly (3), Edwards (2), Offiah (2), Radlinski (2), Hall, Paul	Farrell (8)	7,709
5 April 1996	St. Helens	Away	26–41	Hall (2), O'Connor, Smyth, Tuigamala	Paul (3)	15,883
8 April 1996	Warrington	Home	42–12	Edwards (2), Haughton, A. Johnson, Paul, Radlinski, Smyth,	Farrell (6), Paul	14,620
14 April 1996	Castleford Tigers	Away	28–10	Connolly, Farrell, Paul, Robinson, Smyth	Farrell (4)	7,985
19 April 1996	Bradford Bulls	Home	22–6	Craig, Haughton, Murdock, Paul	Farrell (3)	9,872
5 May 1996	Paris Saint-Germain	Home	76–8	Paul (3), Smyth (3), Connolly (2), Haughton (2), Cassidy, Farrell, Murdock, Radlinski	Paul (6), Farrell (4)	10,675
14 May 1996	Halifax Blue Sox	Away	50–4	Robinson (2), Smyth (2), Cassidy, Connolly, Edwards, Haughton, Murdock	Farrell (5), Hall (2)	5,269
18 May 1996	Workington Town	Away	64–16	Farrell (2), Robinson (2), Tuigamala (2), Craig, Edwards, Hall, Murdock, Offiah	Farrell (8), Paul, Tuigamala	3,176
29 May 1996	Sheffield Eagles	Home	50–6	Offiah (3), Cassidy, Connolly, Hall, A.Johnson, Paul, Smyth	Farrell (7)	9,158
1 June 1996	Leeds	Away	40–20	Smyth (2), Murdock, Offiah, Paul, Robinson	Farrell (8)	9,508
9 June 1996	London Broncos	Home	18–18	Murdock, Robinson, Tuigamala	Farrell (3)	9,189
16 June 1996	Oldham Bears	Home	44–16	Robinson (3), Smyth (2), Connolly, Ellison, Haughton, Quinnell	Farrell (2), Edwards, Hall	7,226
21 June 1996	St. Helens	Home	35–19	Robinson (2), Haughton, Murdock, Smyth, Tuigamala	Paul (3), Hall (2), Robinson (DG)	20,429
30 June 1996	Warrington	Away	21–0	Paul (2), Smyth (2)	Connolly (2), Wright (DG)	8,103
5 July 1996	Castleford Tigers	Home	26–25	Robinson (2), A. Johnson, Tuigamala	Farrell (5)	8,180
12 July 1996	Bradford Bulls	Away	12–20	Ellison, Paul	Farrell (2)	17,360
20 July 1996	Paris Saint-Germain	Away	24–20	A. Johnson, Radlinski, Robinson, Tuigamala	Farrell (4)	5,428
26 July 1996	Halifax Blue Sox	Home	34–26	Connolly, Ellison, Murdock, Paul, Radlinski, Tuigamala	Farrell (5)	8,221
3 August 1996	Sheffield Eagles	Away	54–12	Paul (2), Connolly, Edwards, Ellison, Hall, Haughton, Murdock, Robinson	Farrell (9)	5,103
9 August 1996	Leeds	Home	68–14	Robinson (5), Connolly (2), Edwards (2), Cowie, Murdock, Radlinski, Tuigamala	Farrell (8)	7,814
17 August 1996	London Broncos	Away	34–13	Paul (2), Edwards, A. Johnson, Robinson, Tuigamala	Farrell (5)	10,014
24 August 1996	Workington Town	Home	78–4	Barrow (3), Paul (3), Edwards (2), Haughton (2), Robinson (2), Ellison, Farrell	Farrell (9), Tuigamala (2)	6,466

=== Premiership ===
Game	Date	Opponent	Venue	Score	Tries	Goals	Attendance	Ref
Semi Final	31 August 1996	Bradford Bulls	Home	42–36	Edwards (4), Ellison (2), Paul, Radlinski	Farrell (5)	9,878	MR
Final	8 September 1996	St. Helens	Neutral	44–14	Ellison (3), Connolly, Edwards, Haughton, Murdock, Paul, Robinson	Farrell (4)	35,013	MR

=== Challenge Cup ===
Wigan's fourth round Challenge Cup tie against Second Division side Bramley took place a week after the end of the previous season. Wigan progressed to the next round with a comfortable 74–12 win, and drew Salford Reds in the next round. Wigan lost 16–26 against their First Division opponents, ending the club's unbeaten run of 43 games in the competition, and was the first time they had been knocked out of the Challenge Cup since being defeated by Oldham in February 1987. The result is considered one of the biggest upsets in the history of the competition.

Round	Date	Opponent	Venue	Score	Tries	Goals	Attendance	Ref
Fourth	28 January 1996	Bramley	Home	74–12	Offiah (4), Farrell (2), Quinnell (2), Radlinski (2), Connolly, Cowie, Robinson, Tuigamala	Hall (5), Paul (4)	4,627	MR
Fifth	11 February 1996	Salford Reds	Away	16–26	Tuigamala (2), Offiah	Farrell, Paul	10,048	MR

=== Clash of the Codes ===
In addition to their league and cup exploits, Wigan took part in a special two-game series against Bath, the reigning champions of rugby union's Courage League, with one game being played under the rules of each code. Wigan won the game played under league rules at Maine Road 82–6, but lost the union game at Twickenham by 44–19.

Game	Date	Opponent	Venue	Score	Tries	Goals	Attendance	Ref
League	8 May 1996	Bath	Neutral	82–6	Offiah (6), Robinson (2), O'Connor (2), Johnson (2), Paul, Cassidy, Quinnell, Murdock	Hall (5), Farrell (4)	20,148	MR
Union	25 May 1996	Bath	Neutral	19–44	Murdock (2), Tuigamala	Farrell (2)	42,000	MR

=== Middlesex Sevens ===
During the 1996 season, Wigan competed in the Middlesex Sevens, a union sevens competition, and won the tournament.

== Squad ==
No	Player	Apps	Tries	Goals	DGs	Points
1	Kris Radlinski	21	10	0	0	40
2	Jason Robinson	25	26	0	1	105
3	Va'aiga Tuigamala	25	13	3	0	58
4	Gary Connolly	25	15	2	0	64
5	Martin Offiah	10	12	0	0	48
6	Henry Paul	23	22	19	0	126
7	Shaun Edwards	24	17	1	0	70
8	Kelvin Skerrett	12	0	0	0	0
9	Martin Hall	26	6	10	0	44
10	Terry O'Connor	26	1	0	0	4
11	Simon Haughton	26	11	0	0	44
12	Mick Cassidy	25	3	0	0	12
13	Andy Farrell	26	7	113	0	254
14	Rob Smyth	17	16	0	0	64
15	Danny Ellison	11	10	0	0	40
16	Scott Quinnell	11	3	0	0	12
17	Andy Johnson	21	5	0	0	20
18	Craig Murdock	21	11	0	0	44
19	Martin Dermott	0	0	0	0	0
20	Daryl Cardiss	1	0	0	0	0
21	Nigel Wright	2	0	0	1	1
21	Andy Craig	11	2	0	0	8
22	Steve Barrow	10	3	0	0	12
22	Paul Johnson	1	0	0	0	0
23	Matt Knowles	3	0	0	0	0
24	Shem Tatupu	3	0	0	0	0
25	Neil Cowie	21	2	0	0	8
26	Sean Long	3	0	0	0	0
27	Neil Baynes	3	0	0	0	0
28	Gaël Tallec	1	0	0	0	0

=== Transfers ===
==== In ====
Player	Pos	From	Fee	Date	Ref
Stuart Lester	Fullback	Auckland Warriors		August 1996	
Stephen Holgate	Second-row	Workington Town	£100,000	December 1996	
Ian Sherratt	Prop forward	Oldham Bears	£30,000	December 1996	
Doc Murray	Fullback	Auckland Warriors		December 1996	

==== Out ====
Player	Pos	To	Fee	Date	Ref
Scott Quinnell	Second-row	Richmond (RU)	£250,000	June 1996	
Shem Tatupu	Prop forward	Northampton Saints (RU)	£80,000	July 1996	
Martin Offiah	Winger	London Broncos	£300,000	August 1996	
Martin Dermott	Hooker	Warrington Wolves		September 1996	
Andy Craig	Centre	Swinton Lions		December 1996	
