= 1998 Wigan Warriors season =

- Super League III champions
- Super League III Rank: 1st
- Play-off result: Won Grand Final
- Challenge Cup: Runners-up
- 1998 record: Wins: 21; draws: 0; losses: 2
- Points scored: For: 762; against: 222

Team information
- Stadium: Central Park
← 1997	List of seasons	1999 →

The 1998 Wigan Warriors season was the 103rd season in the club's rugby league history and the third season in the Super League. Coached by John Monie, the Warriors competed in Super League III and finished in 1st place, and went on to win the Grand Final at Old Trafford against Leeds Rhinos. The club also competed in the 1998 Challenge Cup, and finished as runners-up following a surprise defeat in the final against Sheffield Eagles.

== Background ==
In March 1998, Dave Whelan became owner of Wigan Warriors after shareholders voted in favour of the takeover.

== Table ==
	Team	Pld	W	D	L	PF	PA	PD	Pts
1	Wigan Warriors	23	21	0	2	762	222	+540	42
2	Leeds Rhinos	23	19	0	4	662	369	+293	38
3	Halifax Blue Sox	23	18	0	5	658	390	+268	36
4	St. Helens	23	14	1	8	673	459	+214	29
5	Bradford Bulls	23	12	0	11	498	450	+48	24
6	Castleford Tigers	23	10	1	12	446	522	-76	21
7	London Broncos	23	10	0	13	415	476	-61	20
8	Sheffield Eagles	23	8	2	13	495	541	-46	18
9	Hull Sharks	23	8	0	15	421	574	-153	16
10	Warrington Wolves	23	7	1	15	411	645	-234	15
11	Salford Reds	23	6	1	16	319	575	-256	13
12	Huddersfield Giants	23	2	0	21	288	825	-537	4

Play-offs

== Squad ==
No	Player	Apps	Tries	Goals	DGs	Points
1	Kris Radlinski	30	13	0	0	52
2	Jason Robinson	30	17	0	0	68
3	Danny Moore	27	12	0	0	48
4	Gary Connolly	30	16	2	0	68
5	Mark Bell	27	15	0	0	60
6	Henry Paul	28	15	6	0	72
7	Tony Smith	25	15	0	0	68
8	Neil Cowie	23	3	0	0	12
9	Robbie McCormack	29	3	0	0	12
10	Tony Mestrov	29	1	0	0	4
11	Denis Betts	20	4	0	0	16
12	Simon Haughton	27	9	0	0	36
13	Andy Farrell	30	7	152	1	333
14	Mick Cassidy	24	1	0	0	4
15	Jon Clarke	9	1	0	0	4
16	Terry O'Connor	23	1	0	0	4
17	Stephen Holgate	22	3	0	0	12
18	Lee Hansen	1	0	0	0	0
19	Craig Murdock	2	4	0	0	16
20	Lee Gilmour	30	10	0	0	40
21	Andy Johnson	0	0	0	0	0
22	Rob Smyth	1	0	0	0	0
23	Daryl Cardiss	7	2	0	0	8
25	Paul Johnson	24	13	0	0	52
26	Neil Baynes	5	1	0	0	4
27	Andrew Isherwood	3	0	0	0	0
28	Rob Ball	1	0	0	0	0
29	Wes Davies	1	1	0	0	4

== Transfers ==
=== In ===
Player	Pos	From	Fee	Date	Ref

=== Out ===
Player	Pos	To	Fee	Date	Ref
Danny Ellison	Winger	Castleford Tigers		January 1998	
Gaël Tallec	Second-row	Castleford Tigers		January 1998	
