= Clash of the Codes (rugby) =

1996 UK rugby match

Wigan	Bath

Rugby League game
Wigan	Bath
82	6
- Date: 8 May 1996
- Venue: Maine Road, Manchester
- Referee: Russell Smith (England)
- Attendance: 20,148

Rugby Union game
Bath	Wigan
44	19
- Date: 25 May 1996
- Venue: Twickenham Stadium, London
- Referee: Brian Campsall (England)
- Attendance: 42,000

Clash of the Codes was a special two match inter-code series between rugby union side Bath and rugby league side Wigan, played in May 1996. Other Clash of Codes games have also taken place.

== Background ==
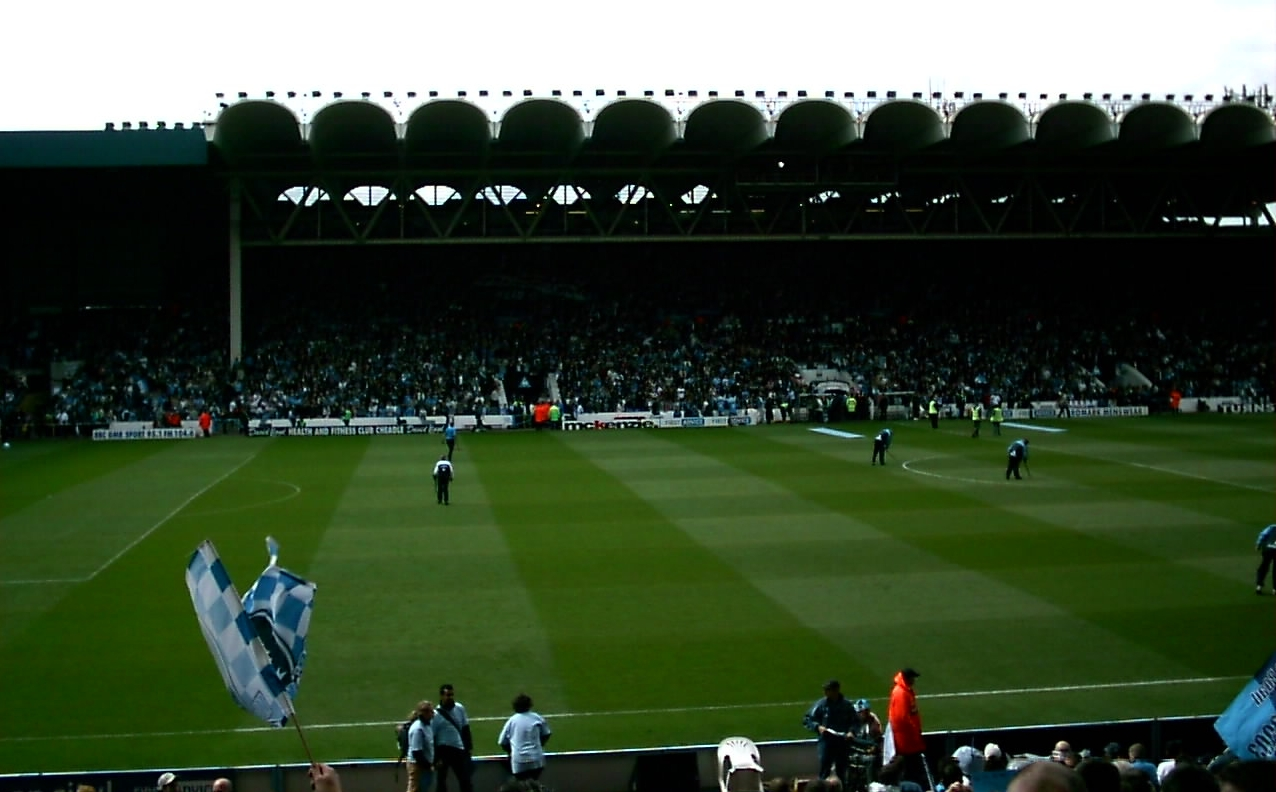
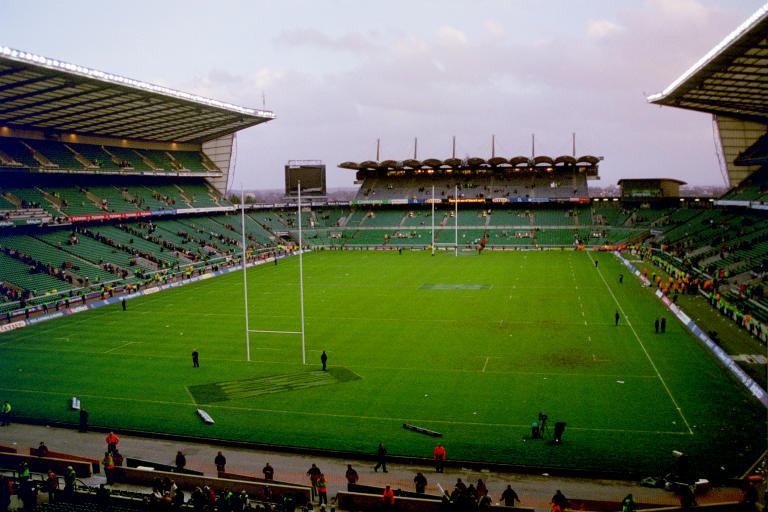
Maine Road (left) was location for the rugby league game, while Twickenham hosted the rugby union game.

In 1895, most rugby clubs in the North of England broke away from the governing body of Rugby football, the Rugby Football Union, and formed a rival body, the Northern Rugby Football Union (later renamed the Rugby Football League) over the issue of payments to players. This "Great Schism" led to the creation of two forms of Rugby football - rugby union governed by the Rugby Football Union and rugby league overseen by the Rugby Football League.

100 years later in August 1995, the International Rugby Board announced that rugby union was to be an "open" game, ending the prohibition of payments to players. In January 1996, an announcement was made that Bath FC, at that time the dominant club side in English rugby union, and Wigan RLFC, similarly the country's dominant rugby league side, would meet in a two-game, cross-code challenge series that would see both clubs playing to each other's set of laws.

The cross-code challenge met with lukewarm support from both the Rugby Football Union and the Rugby Football League. The dates for the games were set for May 1996, which was the end of the domestic rugby union season, but was only a few weeks into the rugby league season (rugby league having made the switch to being a summer game that year). The date for the proposed game under union rules clashed with Wigan's Super League game against the Sheffield Eagles, while the RFU stated that Twickenham would be unavailable to stage the game when they were approached by Bath due to their plans to reseed the pitch. Both clubs had agreed that, to maximise the potential attendances, the two games should be held at venues other than their own stadia (the Recreation Ground and Central Park). However, when word came out that Cardiff Arms Park had offered to stage the union game instead, the RFU decided to postpone the pitch reseeding and offer Twickenham as the venue. Maine Road, the home of Manchester City, and a regular venue for major rugby league games at the time, was chosen to host the game to be played under league rules.

== The teams ==
Bath FC
Wigan RLFC

=== Bath ===
Entering the new professional era, Bath were the dominant club in England. Since the beginning of the league structure in rugby union in 1987, the club had won six Courage League titles, and ten JPS/Pilkington Cups since that competition was started in 1972. The club also provided a sizeable number of players to the England team, including the then England captain Phil de Glanville.

=== Wigan ===
The beginning of the new Super League era in rugby league saw Wigan still at the top of rugby league. The team had just won the last winter RFL championship, their seventh consecutive title, while they had lost in the Challenge Cup for the first time in almost a decade, having won their eighth consecutive final in April 1995. As with Bath, Wigan provided a significant number of players to the Great Britain national team.

== Rugby league game ==
=== Build-up ===
Five days prior to the rugby league game, Bath had won the Pilkington Cup in a hard-fought match up against Leicester that they had won 16–15, thus achieving a league and cup double, having won the Courage League title the week before. As a consequence, Bath had little opportunity to prepare for the game at Maine Road, with a single warm up game under league rules against South Wales RLFC. By contrast, Wigan had a relatively quiet build up; the Challenge Cup final, played the week before, was the first not to feature the club for a decade, allowing the players a week without a game. The day after Bath's Pilkington Cup final, Wigan played a Super League game at home to Paris Saint-Germain, which they won 76–8.

=== The game ===
Bath got off to a bad start from the kick-off, when Jon Callard failed to make his kick go the required 10 metres. Within 90 seconds of the kick-off, Martin Offiah touched down for Wigan, but was penalised for a foot in touch. However, with only three minutes gone, Offiah scored the first of his six tries of the night. The difficulties that Bath had with coming to terms with the game led to further tries for Offiah (2), Henry Paul, Jason Robinson, Terry O'Connor, Andy Johnson, Craig Murdock and Scott Quinnell, with the score at half-time 52–0. The first half proved to be such a mismatch that it was more than fifteen minutes before Bath were able to get through a set of tackles without making an error.

Bath were able to get into the game more after half-time and, following O'Connor's second try for Wigan, got on the scoresheet through Callard touching down and converting. This though led to a further period of sustained pressure from Wigan that led to a further six tries from the reigning champions and a final score of 82–6 in favour of Wigan.

8 May 1996
20:00 BST

Wigan	82 – 6	Bath
Tries: Offiah 6 Robinson 2 O'Connor 2 Johnson 2 Paul 1 Cassidy 1 Quinnell 1 Murdock 1 Goals: Hall 5 Farrell 4	Report	Tries: 1 Callard; Goals: 1 Callard

Maine Road, Manchester
Attendance: 20,148
Referee: Russell Smith

Wigan	Bath

FB	1	Kris Radlinski
RW	2	Jason Robinson
RC	3	Va'aiga Tuigamala
LC	4	Gary Connolly
LW	5	Martin Offiah
SO	6	Henry Paul
SH	7	Shaun Edwards (c)
PR	8	Neil Cowie
HK	9	Martin Hall
PR	10	Terry O'Connor
SR	11	Simon Haughton
SR	12	Mick Cassidy
LF	13	Andy Farrell
Substitutions:
IC	14	Rob Smyth
IC	15	Craig Murdock
IC	16	Scott Quinnell
IC	17	Andy Johnson
Coach:
Graeme West

FB	17	Audley Lumsden
RW	15	Jon Sleightholme
RC	12	Phil de Glanville (c)
LC	14	Fraser Waters
LW	11	Adedayo Adebayo
SO	10	Mike Catt
SH	16	Jonathan Callard
PR	1	Kevin Yates
HK	9	Ian Sanders
PR	4	Martin Haag
SR	18	Adam Vander
SR	7	Steve Ojomoh
LF	6	Andy Robinson
Substitutions:
IC	19	Rich Butland
IC	5	Nigel Redman
IC	3	Neil McCarthy
IC	8	Ed Pearce
Coach:
Brian Ashton

== Rugby union game ==
=== Build-up ===
Wigan's dominance in the first game led to some suggesting that they would be able to complete a 'double' over Bath. However, Wigan captain Shaun Edwards related that, following the end of the first game, Bath forward Nigel Redman had told him of his relish at the prospect of the second meeting, with a realisation that Redman "couldn't wait to get...in the scrums". Two and a half weeks separated the rugby league game from the return match under union rules at Twickenham. In that time, Wigan played two league games away to Halifax and Workington Town, as well as organising practice games under union rules against Orrell. Prior to these, the club became the first rugby league side to play at Twickenham when they sent a strong squad to take part in the Middlesex Sevens, a tournament that they went on to win, beating Wasps in the final.

With Bath having won the league and cup double, and the domestic season concluded prior to the first game, they were able to concentrate on the preparation for the second encounter.

=== The game ===
Bath again kicked the game off, but this time, rather than conceding a penalty, Jon Callard's kick enabled Martin Haag to take and recycle the ball, allowing Bath's forwards an early opportunity to ruck and maul against opponents unused to this type of play, with Wigan failing to win any of the first twenty rucks. Only a Bath knock-on during the drive prevented a repeat of the first game and an early try for the experts. What this meant though was the Wigan pack engaging in a union scrum early on, and coming to terms with the differences of this compared with a typically uncontested scrum in their own game. Indeed, it was through scrummaging inexperience that Wigan conceded their first try, a penalty try given through their repeated collapsing of the scrum. It was 18 minutes until Wigan handled the ball in the opposition half, with Bath gaining further tries through Adedayo Adebayo (2) and Jon Sleightholme prior to half-time, allowing the Courage League champions to build an unanswered 25-point lead at the break. Jonathan Davies, the dual-code international, made the observation that Wigan were suffering from constant infringements of "rules they didn't know existed".

As in the first game, the second half followed a similar pattern to begin with, Mike Catt and Phil de Glanville scoring early, and the likelihood coming of a score of similar dimensions. However, as the second half progressed, Bath's players began to tire and allowed gaps to open up for Wigan to exploit. Craig Murdock scored a pair of tries that went the length of the field, while Va'aiga Tuigamala got a third before Ian Sanders got Bath's seventh with a pushover from the pack. Unlike the first game, the second half of the second game saw the visitors match the home side for points to leave a final score of 44–19 in Bath's favour.

25 May 1996
15:00 BST

Bath	44 – 19	Wigan
Try: Adebayo 2 Sleightholme 1 Catt 1 de Glanville 1 Sanders 1 Penalty Try 1 Con: Callard 3 Pen: Callard 1	Report	Try: Murdock 2 Tuigamala 1 Con: Farrell 2

Twickenham, London
Attendance: 42,000
Referee: Brian Campsall

Bath	Wigan

FB	16	Jonathan Callard
RW	15	Jon Sleightholme
RC	14	Phil de Glanville (c)
LC	12	Adedayo Adebayo
LW	11	Audley Lumsden
FH	10	Mike Catt
SH	9	Ian Sanders
TP	1	Kevin Yates
HK	2	Graham Dawe
LP	3	Victor Ubogu
LF	4	Martin Haag
LF	5	Nigel Redman
BF	6	Andy Robinson
OF	7	Ed Pearce
No8	8	Steve Ojomoh
Replacements:
R		Joe Ewens
R		Charlie Harrison
R		Rich Butland
R		Gary French
R		Neil McCarthy
Coach:
Brian Ashton

FB	16	Kris Radlinski
RW	14	Jason Robinson
RC	13	Henry Paul
LC	12	Gary Connolly
LW	11	Martin Offiah
FH	10	Joe Lydon
SH	18	Craig Murdock
TP	1	Terry O'Connor
HK	2	Martin Hall
LP	3	Neil Cowie
LF	4	Andy Farrell (c)
LF	23	Graeme West
BF	6	Shem Tatupu
OF	13	Va'aiga Tuigamala
No8	8	Scott Quinnell
Replacements:
R		Andy Craig
R		Mick Cassidy
R		Gaël Tallec
R		Andy Johnson
R		Simon Haughton
Coach:
Graeme West

=== Quotes ===
A lot quicker than it looks from the sidelines, this union business.
Craig Murdock, Wigan

== Aftermath ==
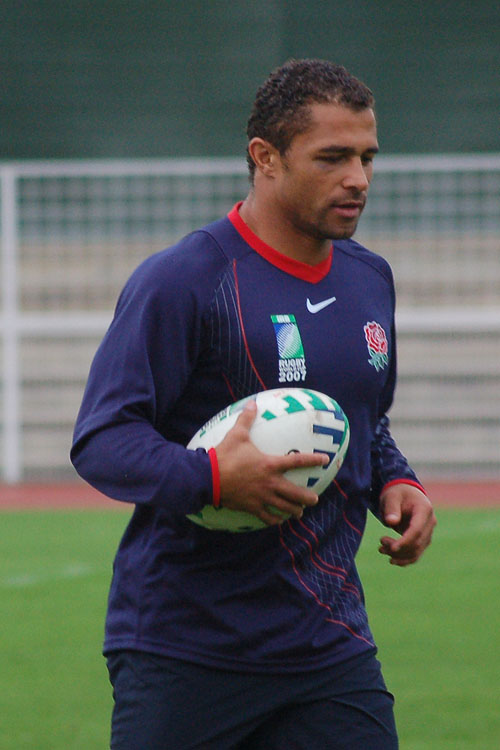
Jason Robinson made a successful transition from rugby league to rugby union, going on to win the 2003 World Cup

Although played in some quarters as the start of a great coming together of the two codes, most people saw the "cross-code challenge" as primarily a commercial exercise. Wigan, having lost out on the income generated by a run in the Challenge Cup, were looking for ways to regain that, while Bath were in the process of making the transition into a fully professional outfit. That being said, the series did allow Bath to be exposed to a professional rugby team, with all of the consequences for fitness, strength and pace in rugby union.

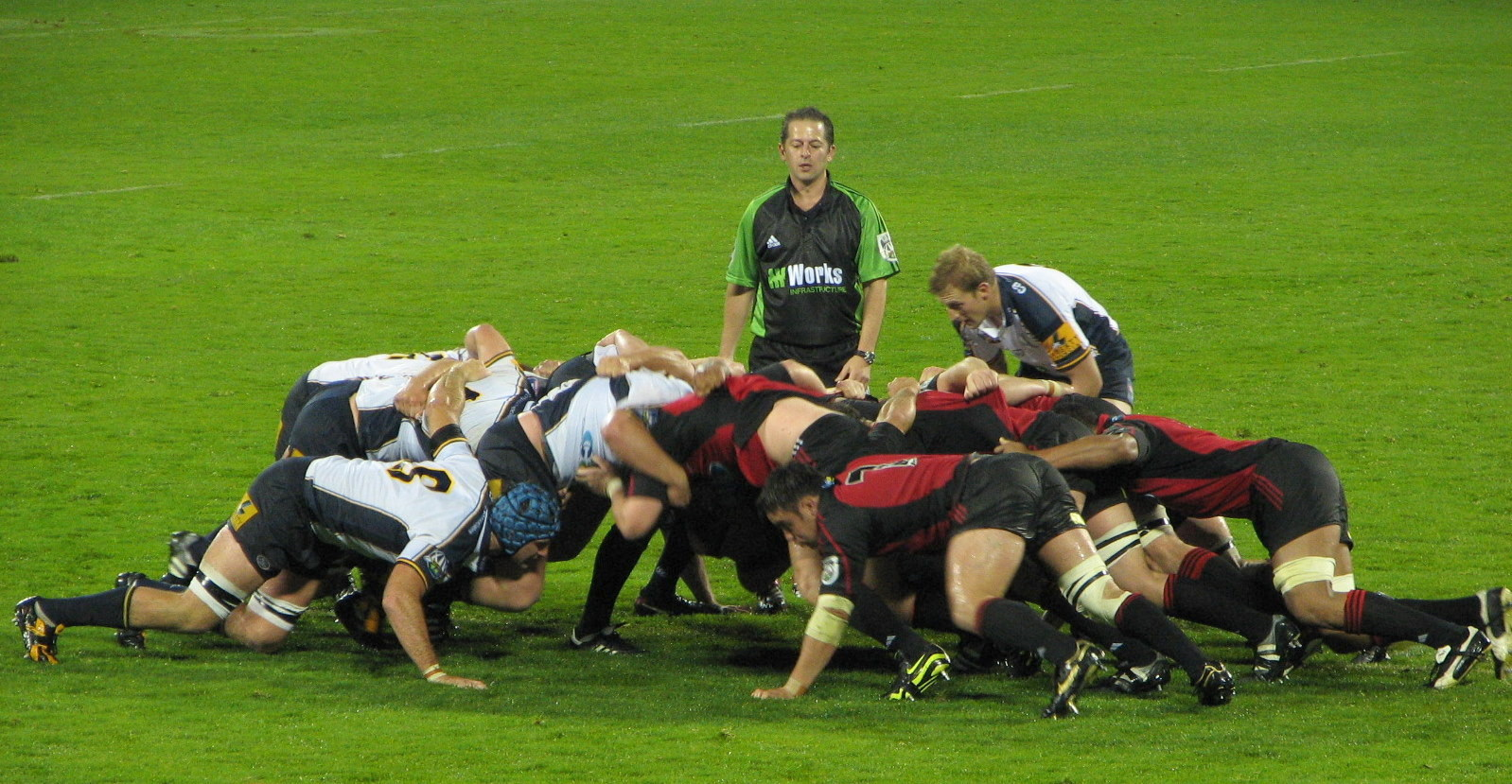
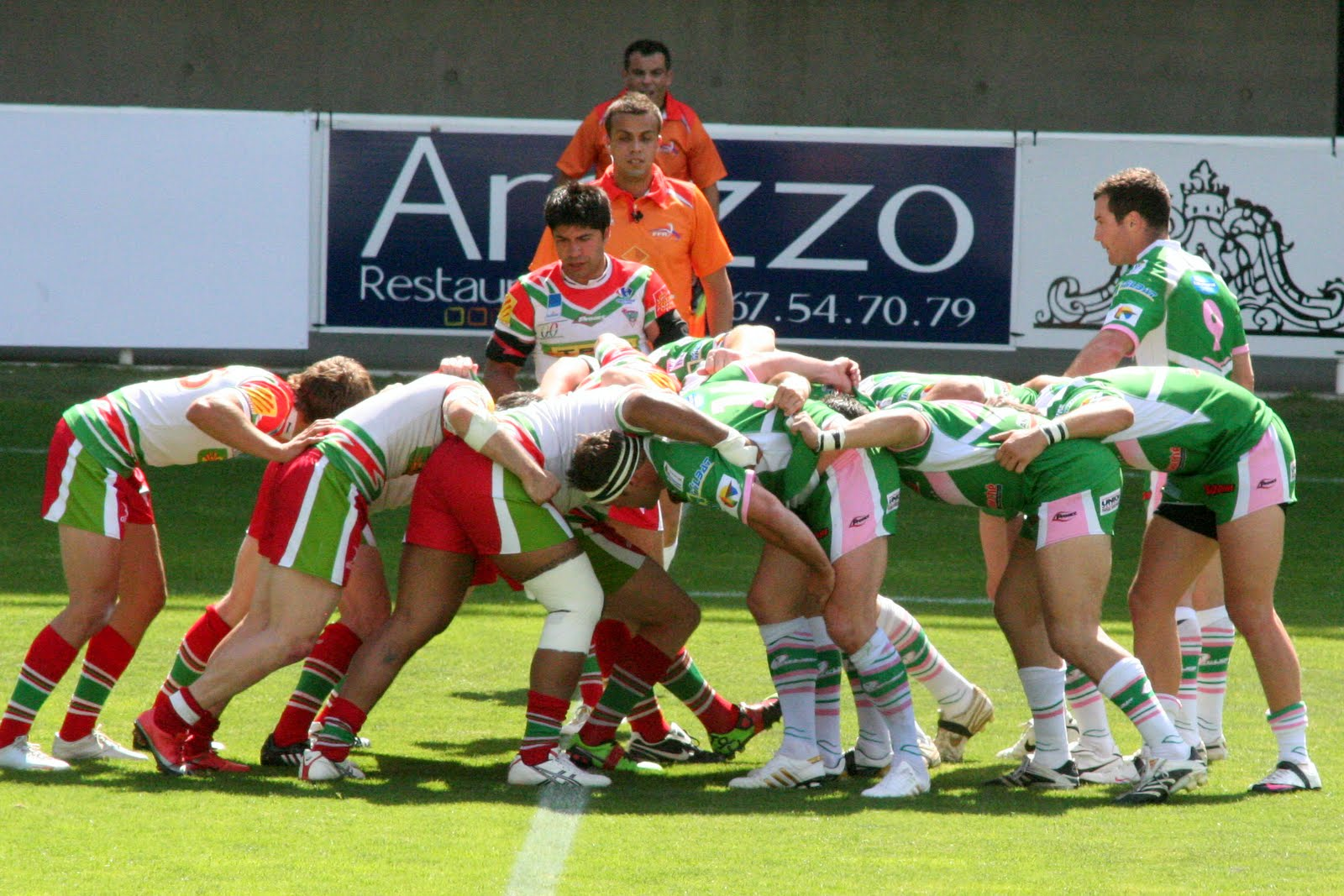
As a result of the technicalities of the scrum in rugby union (left) as opposed to rugby league (right), the rugby union game was played with limits imposed that were intended to prevent injuries to the Wigan players.

Although Bath were evidently outmatched in the first game, they were able to take some positives; Phil de Glanville made the most tackles of any back on either side, while de Glanville, Steve Ojomoh, Jon Callard and Adedayo Adebayo all impressed watching league experts. Similarly, in the second game, as Bath tired, Wigan were able to exploit both their superior fitness and their superior running game to gain a foothold during the second half. However, one of Bath's star players at the time, England centre Jeremy Guscott, refused to play in the series, as he felt that there was a lack of balance between the two games - the only alteration that took place in the league fixture came at half-time when Bath requested unlimited substitutions (rather than the fixed number of ten interchanges normally permitted); apart from this, the match was played as a standard, full intensity game of rugby league. In the union fixture however, although there was a greater intensity to the scrummaging than league players would normally experience, the scrums were not fully contested, as scrummaging in rugby union is highly technical, particularly in the front row. Had the scrums been fully contested, Guscott stated that it was likely a number of the Wigan forwards could have been seriously injured. But, this meant that Wigan were able to gain more of a foothold in the union fixture than Bath had been able to do in the league fixture.

Following the transition of rugby union to professionalism, and the ending of the ban on players that had played rugby league from playing the game, a number of notable rugby league players chose to take up short-term contracts with clubs in the Courage League during the Super League close-season. A number of Wigan's players from the cross-code series undertook such moves, including Jason Robinson and Henry Paul who turned out for Bath, as well as Martin Offiah, Va'aiga Tuigamala and Gary Connolly. Some later made permanent moves to the 15-a-side game, with Tuigamala's transfer to Newcastle Falcons for £1m being a world record, while Robinson became a mainstay of the England rugby union team, winning the World Cup in 2003, as well as becoming the first player to win both league's Super League and union's Premiership titles (with Wigan and Sale respectively).

The cross-code challenge occurred while both Bath and Wigan were in the twilight of their time at the top of their respective rugby football codes. Wigan's great rivals St. Helens won the first Super League title in 1996 and, although Wigan won the first grand final in 1998, and got to three subsequent Grand Finals, they would not win another league title until 2010. Bath meanwhile won the 1998 Heineken Cup, becoming the first English team to do so, as well as the 2008 European Challenge Cup, but failed to win a domestic trophy between their victory in the 1996 Pilkington Cup and winning the Premiership Rugby Cup in 2025, with their position at the summit of the English game taken by their fierce rivals Leicester.

The two match series was the beginning of a thaw in relations between rugby union and rugby league. The success of Wigan's two visits to Twickenham, for both the game against Bath and the Middlesex Sevens, led to the RFU offering to play host to the Challenge Cup Final in the event of Wembley, the event's traditional home, not being available. The RFL eventually took them up on this offer, with both the 2001 and 2006 finals taking place at the home of Rugby Union. Twickenham was also the venue for the opening game of the 2000 Rugby League World Cup between England and Australia, the first time the 13-a-side game had been played there, while games during that tournament were also played at Kingsholm and Stradey Park, both bastions of club rugby union. Bradford Bulls then followed Wigan's lead by participating in and winning the Middlesex Sevens in 2002. Similarly, rugby union has also on occasion decamped into the northern heartlands of rugby league; in 1998, England played two qualifying games for the 1999 Rugby World Cup at the Alfred McAlpine Stadium in Huddersfield, which also hosted a game during the final tournament. England have also played twice at Old Trafford, the traditional home of the Super League Grand Final. However, possibly the most notable event came in 1998 when Leeds Rhinos RLFC and Leeds Tykes RUFC merged to form Leeds Rugby Limited, described as "the world's first dual code rugby partnership". Although there are separate teams in both codes, they are owned by a common organisation with a single board.

== See also ==
- Comparison of rugby league and rugby union
