= Matthew Knowles =

Matthew or Matt Knowles may refer to:

- Matt Knowles (born 1974), professional wrestler
- Matt Knowles (soccer) (born 1970), soccer player
- Matt Knowles (rugby league) (born 1975), rugby league footballer
- Matt William Knowles, actor
- Mathew Knowles (born 1952), record executive, father of Beyoncé Knowles
