= Tony Morrison =

English rugby league footballer

Personal information
- Born: 17 December 1965 (age 59); St Helens, England

Playing information
- Position: Second-row
Club
Years	Team	Pld	T	G	FG	P
1985–89	Oldham	20	0	0	0	0
1989–92	Swinton	72	10	0	0	40
1992–95	Castleford	92	21	0	0	84
1996	Swinton	7	2	0	0	8
1996–98	Rochdale Hornets	33	8	0	0	32
	Total	224	41	0	0	164

Tony Morrison (born 17 December 1965) is an English former professional rugby league footballer who played in the 1980s and 1990s. He played at club level for Oldham, Swinton, and Castleford.

== Background ==
Tony Morrison was born in St Helens. Lancashire, England.

== Playing career ==
=== Castleford ===
Morrison was transferred from Swinton to Castleford in May 1992 for a fee of £30,000.

He played at second-row in Castleford's 33–2 victory over Wigan in the 1993–94 Regal Trophy Final during the 1993–94 season at Headingley, Leeds on Saturday 22 January 1994.
