= David Mycoe =

English rugby league footballer

Personal information
- Born: 1 May 1972 (age 53); Wakefield, England

Playing information
- Position: Stand-off
Club
Years	Team	Pld	T	G	FG	P
1989–97	Sheffield Eagles	188	39	200	1	557
1998	Wakefield Trinity Wildcats	21	4	3	0	22
1999	Hunslet Hawks	16	1	1	0	6
1999	Doncaster Dragons	7	1	16	0	36
2000–01	Dewsbury Rams	51	7	14	1	57
2002	Gateshead Thunder	8	0	0	0	0
2002	Hunslet Hawks	18	4	18	0	52
2003–05	Dewsbury Rams	52	4	8	1	33
	Total	361	60	260	3	763
Representative
Years	Team	Pld	T	G	FG	P
1990–92	Great Britain U-21	4	3	0	0	12

David Mycoe (born 1 May 1972) is an English former professional rugby league footballer who played in the 1990s and 2000s. He played at club level for Sheffield Eagles, Wakefield Trinity Wildcats, Dewsbury Rams, Gateshead Thunder and Hunslet Hawks, as a stand-off.

== Playing career ==
Mycoe made his début for Sheffield Eagles in the 1989–90 season, aged 17. He played stand-off, and scored 2-goals in Sheffield Eagles' 16-29 defeat by Wakefield Trinity in the 1992 Yorkshire Cup Final during the 1992–93 season at Elland Road, Leeds on Sunday 18 October 1992.

David was inducted into Sheffield Eagles Hall of Fame on 19 September 2025.
