= 1993–94 Regal Trophy =

- Structure: National knockout championship
- Teams: 48
- Winners: Castleford
- Runners-up: Wigan

The 1993–94 Regal Trophy was a British rugby league knockout tournament. It was the 23rd season that the competition was held, and was the fifth staging of the competition since it was re-named the Regal Trophy.

Castleford won the final, beating the pre-match favourites Wigan by the score of 33-2. The match was played at Headingley, Leeds in front of an attendance of 15,626.

== Background ==
This season saw virtually a complete re-vamping of the competition for instance; The Preliminary round was renamed "First Round", with every other succeeding round being renamed. The (newly named) First Round now consisted of 16 matches involving 32 clubs, with a further 16 clubs being given byes into the Second Round. The number of entrants was further increased by inviting eleven of the top junior clubs. The inclusion of two French clubs continued with the inclusion of AS Saint Estève. The sixteen First Round winners added to the sixteen clubs given byes, gave a total of entrants into the second round as thirty-two. There were no drawn matches in the competition this season.

== Competition and results ==
=== Round 1 - First Round ===
Involved 16 matches and 32 clubs, with 16 byes

Game No	Fixture Date	Home team	Score	Away team	Venue	Att	Rec	Notes	Ref
1	Fri 29 Oct 1993	Dewsbury	56-10	West Bowling	Mount Pleasant	616		1	
2	Sun 31 Oct 1993	Barrow	54-12	Leigh Miners' Welfare	Craven Park	1140		2	
3	Sun 31 Oct 1993	Batley	64-1	Queens	Mount Pleasant	608		3	
4	Sun 31 Oct 1993	Bramley	17-8	Woolston Rovers	McLaren Field	510		4	
5	Sun 31 Oct 1993	Carlisle	36-24	Carcassonne	Gifford Park	593		5	
6	Sun 31 Oct 1993	Doncaster	62-4	Myson	Bentley Road Stadium/Tattersfield	858		6	
7	Sun 31 Oct 1993	Highfield	30-22	Ellenborough	Hoghton Road Stadium	227		7	
8	Sun 31 Oct 1993	Huddersfield	36-8	Irlam Hornets	Leeds Road	1705		8	
9	Sun 31 Oct 1993	Hunslet	30-19	Chorley Borough (2)	Elland Road	299			
10	Sun 31 Oct 1993	Keighley Cougars	72-12	Nottingham City	Cougar Park	2283		9	
11	Sun 31 Oct 1993	London Crusaders	48-16	AS Saint Estève	Barnet Copthall	746		10	
12	Sun 31 Oct 1993	Rochdale Hornets	80-10	Blackpool Gladiators	Spotland	863			
13	Sun 31 Oct 1993	Ryedale-York	66-14	Hemel Stags	Ryedale Stadium	835		11	
14	Sun 31 Oct 1993	Swinton	24-13	Saddleworth Rangers	Gigg Lane	468		12	
15	Sun 31 Oct 1993	Whitehaven	46-0	Egremont	Recreation Ground	1480		13	
16	Sun 31 Oct 1993	Workington Town	74-6	Wigan St Patricks	Derwent Park	1464		14	

=== Round 2 Second Round ===
Involved 16 matches and 32 clubs. The 16 winners of the first round were joined by the 16 First Division clubs in the second round.

Game No	Fixture Date	Home team	Score	Away team	Venue	Att	Rec	Notes	Ref
1	Fri 12 Nov 1993	Dewsbury	6-20	St. Helens	Mount Pleasant	2272			
2	Sat 13 Nov 1993	Salford	21-12	Leeds	The Willows	1799			
3	Sun 14 Nov 1993	Barrow	8-28	Bradford Northern	Craven Park	2796			
4	Sun 14 Nov 1993	Batley	8-6	Sheffield Eagles	Mount Pleasant	1278			
5	Sun 14 Nov 1993	Carlisle	28-12	Wakefield Trinity	Gifford Park	746			
6	Sun 14 Nov 1993	Halifax	19-10	Keighley Cougars	Thrum Hall	7321			
7	Sun 14 Nov 1993	Highfield	8-26	Oldham	Hoghton Road Stadium	880			
8	Sun 14 Nov 1993	Leigh	20-12	Huddersfield	Hilton Park	3407			
9	Sun 14 Nov 1993	London Crusaders	26-12	Featherstone Rovers	Barnet Copthall	981			
10	Sun 14 Nov 1993	Rochdale Hornets	10-11	Bramley	Spotland	730			
11	Sun 14 Nov 1993	Ryedale-York	12-11	Workington Town	Ryedale Stadium	1456			
12	Sun 14 Nov 1993	Swinton	14-36	Hull F.C.	Gigg Lane	851		15	
13	Sun 14 Nov 1993	Warrington	58-16	Hunslet	Wilderspool	3037			
14	Sun 14 Nov 1993	Whitehaven	8-22	Wigan	Recreation Ground	5185		16	
15	Sun 14 Nov 1993	Widnes	24-4	Doncaster	Naughton Park	3075		17	
16	Mon 15 Nov 1993	Hull Kingston Rovers	12-16	Castleford	Craven Park (2)	2724			

=== Round 3 - Third Round ===
Involved 8 matches and 16 Clubs

Game No	Fixture Date	Home team	Score	Away team	Venue	Att	Rec	Notes	Ref
1	Sat 11 Dec 1993	St. Helens	8-16	Warrington	Knowsley Road	5366			
2	Sun 12 Dec 1993	Carlisle	34-4	Bramley	Gifford Park	516			
3	Sun 12 Dec 1993	Hull F.C.	10-6	Widnes	Boulevard	3412		18	
4	Sun 12 Dec 1993	Oldham	8-16	Wigan	Watersheddings	6342		19	
5	Sun 12 Dec 1993	Ryedale-York	10-42	London Crusaders	Ryedale Stadium	741			
6	Mon 13 Dec 1993	Castleford	54-14	Leigh	Wheldon Road	2116			
7	Tue 14 Dec 1993	Batley	8-12	Salford	Mount Pleasant	809			
8	Thu 16 Dec 1993	Bradford Northern	16-8	Halifax	Odsal	5057			

=== Round 4 -Quarter Finals ===
Involved 4 matches with 8 clubs

Game No	Fixture Date	Home team	Score	Away team	Venue	Att	Rec	Notes	Ref
	Sat 18 Dec 1993	Warrington	10-27	Wigan	Wilderspool	7321		20, 21	
	Sun 19 Dec 1993	Castleford	44-4	Carlisle	Wheldon Road	2624		20	
	Sun 19 Dec 1993	London Crusaders	10-22	Bradford Northern	Barnet Copthall	1878		20	
	Sun 19 Dec 1993	Salford	26-6	Hull F.C.	The Willows	3207		20, 22	

=== Round 5 – Semi-Finals ===
Involved 2 matches and 4 Clubs

Game No	Fixture Date	Home team	Score	Away team	Venue	Att	Rec	Notes	Ref
	Sat 1 Jan 1994	Bradford Northern	10-23	Castleford	Odsal	8351			
	Sat 8 Jan 1994	Salford	12-18	Wigan	The Willows	7483			

=== Final ===
22 January 1994

Castleford	33 – 2	Wigan
Tries: Ketteridge (2), Nikau, Anderson, Crooks; Goals: Crooks (6); Drop goals: Kemp		Goals: Botica

Headingley, Leeds
Attendance: 15,626
Referee: David Campbell (Widnes)
Player of the Match: Martin Ketteridge

==== Teams and scorers ====
Castleford	№	Wigan
	Teams	
Graham Steadman	1	Joe Lydon
St. John Ellis	2	Jason Robinson
Richie Blackmore	3	Barrie-Jon Mather
Grant Anderson	4	Gary Connolly
Simon Middleton	5	Martin Offiah
Tony Kemp	6	Frano Botica
Mike Ford	7	Shaun Edwards
Lee Crooks	8	Kelvin Skerrett
Richard Russell	9	Martin Dermott
Martin Ketteridge	10	Andy Platt
Tony Morrison	11	Neil Cowie
Ian Smales	12	Andy Farrell
Tawera Nikau	13	Phil Clarke
Andy Hay (for Grant Anderson 63-mins)	14	Sam Panapa (for Neil Cowie 30-mins)
Dean Sampson (for Martin Ketteridge 74-mins)	15	Mick Cassidy
John Joyner	Coach	John Dorahy

=== Prize money ===
As part of the sponsorship deal and funds, the prize money awarded to the competing teams for this season is as follows:

Finish Position	Cash prize	No. receiving prize	Total cash
Winner	£35,000	1	£35,000
Runner-up	£18,500	1	£18,500
semi-finalist	£9,750	2	£19,500
quarter-finalist	£6,225	4	£24,900
loser in Rd 3	£4,000	8	£32,000
loser in Rd 2	£2,650	16	£42,400
Professional Clubs in Rd 1	£2,650	18	£47,700
Amateur Clubs in Rd 1	£1,000	14	£14,000
Total prize money			£234,000
Development fund			£126,000
Grand Total			£360,000

=== The road to success ===
This tree excludes the First Round fixtures

Second round
Ryedale-York	12
Workington Town	11
London Crusaders	26
Featherstone Rovers	12
Barrow	8
Bradford Northern	28
Halifax	19
Keighley Cougars	10
Hull Kingston Rovers	12
Castleford	16
Leigh	20
Huddersfield	12
Carlisle	28
Wakefield Trinity	12
Rochdale Hornets	10
Bramley	11
Batley	8
Sheffield Eagles	6
Salford	21
Leeds	12
Swinton	14
Hull F.C.	36
Widnes	24
Doncaster	4
Dewsbury	6
St. Helens	20
Warrington	58
Hunslet	16
Highfield	8
Oldham	26
Whitehaven	8
Wigan	22

Third round
Ryedale-York	10
London Crusaders	42
Bradford Northern	16
Halifax	8
Castleford	54
Leigh	14
Carlisle	34
Bramley	4
Batley	8
Salford	12
Hull F.C.	10
Widnes	6
St. Helens	8
Warrington	16
Oldham	8
Wigan	16

Fourth round
London Crusaders	10
Bradford Northern	22
Castleford	44
Carlisle	4
Salford	26
Hull F.C.	6
Warrington	10
Wigan	27

Semifinals
Bradford Northern	10
Castleford	23
Salford	12
Wigan	18

Final
Castleford	33
Wigan	2

== Notes and comments ==
1 * West Bowling are a junior (or amateur) club from Bradford
2 * Leigh Miners' Welfare are a Junior (amateur) club from Leigh (formed by merger of Astley & Tyldesley and Hope Rangers - and now Leigh Miners Rangers)
3 * Queens are a Junior (amateur) club from Leeds
4 * Woolston Rovers are a Junior (amateur) club from Warrington, becoming Warrington Woolston Rovers in 2003 and Warrington Wizards in 2002. the ground is the old Warrington Home Ground of Wilderspool
5 * Carcassonne played in the French League at Stade Albert Domec
6 * Myson are a Junior (amateur) club from Hull
7 * Ellenborough Rangers are a Junior (amateur) club from the Ellenborough suburb of Maryport, Cumbria
8 * Irlam Hornets ARLFC are a junior club from Irlam, Salford, playing at Cutnook Lane
9 * Wigan official archives gives the club name as Nottingham Borough. There appear to be no other references anywhere to this name and assume it is an misprint
10 * AS Saint Estève was a French rugby league team from Perpignan, which in 2000 it merged with nearby neighbours XIII Catalan to form Union Treiziste Catalaneto compete in the Super Leagueas the Catalans Dragons.
11 * Hemel Stags are a semi professional club based in Hemel Hempstead and playing at the Pennine Way stadium (capacity 2000)
12 * Saddleworth Rangers are a Junior (amateur) club from Oldham
13 * Egremont are a Junior (amateur) club from Cumbria
14 * Wigan St Patricks are a Junior (amateur) club from Wigan
15 * RUGBYLEAGUEproject gives the attendance as 851 but Hull official archives gives it as 819
16 * RUGBYLEAGUEproject gives the attendance as 5,185 but Wigan official archives gives it as 5,128
17 * RUGBYLEAGUEproject gives the attendance as 3,075 but Widnes official archives gives it as 3,074
18 * RUGBYLEAGUEproject and Widnes official archives gives the attendance as 3,412 but Hull official archives gives it as 3,421
19 * RUGBYLEAGUEproject gives the attendance as 6,342 but Wigan official archives gives it as 6,500
20 * Wigan official archives - special details give this as the third round, obviously a mis-print
21 * RUGBYLEAGUEproject gives the attendance as 7,321 but Wigan official archives gives it as 7,231
22 * RUGBYLEAGUEproject and Wigan official archives gives the score as 26-6 but Hull official archives gives it as 24-6
23 * Headingley, Leeds, is the home ground of Leeds RLFC with a capacity of 21,000. The record attendance was 40,175 for a league match between Leeds and Bradford Northern on 21 May 1947.

== See also ==
- 1993-94 Rugby Football League season
- Regal Trophy
- Rugby league county cups

== Sources ==
- Fletcher, Raymond; Howes, David, eds. (1994). Rothmans Rugby League Yearbook 1994-95. London: Headline Publishing Group. ISBN 978-0-7472-7851-1.
