= Patrick Robinson (cyclist) =

English mountain biker (born 1994)

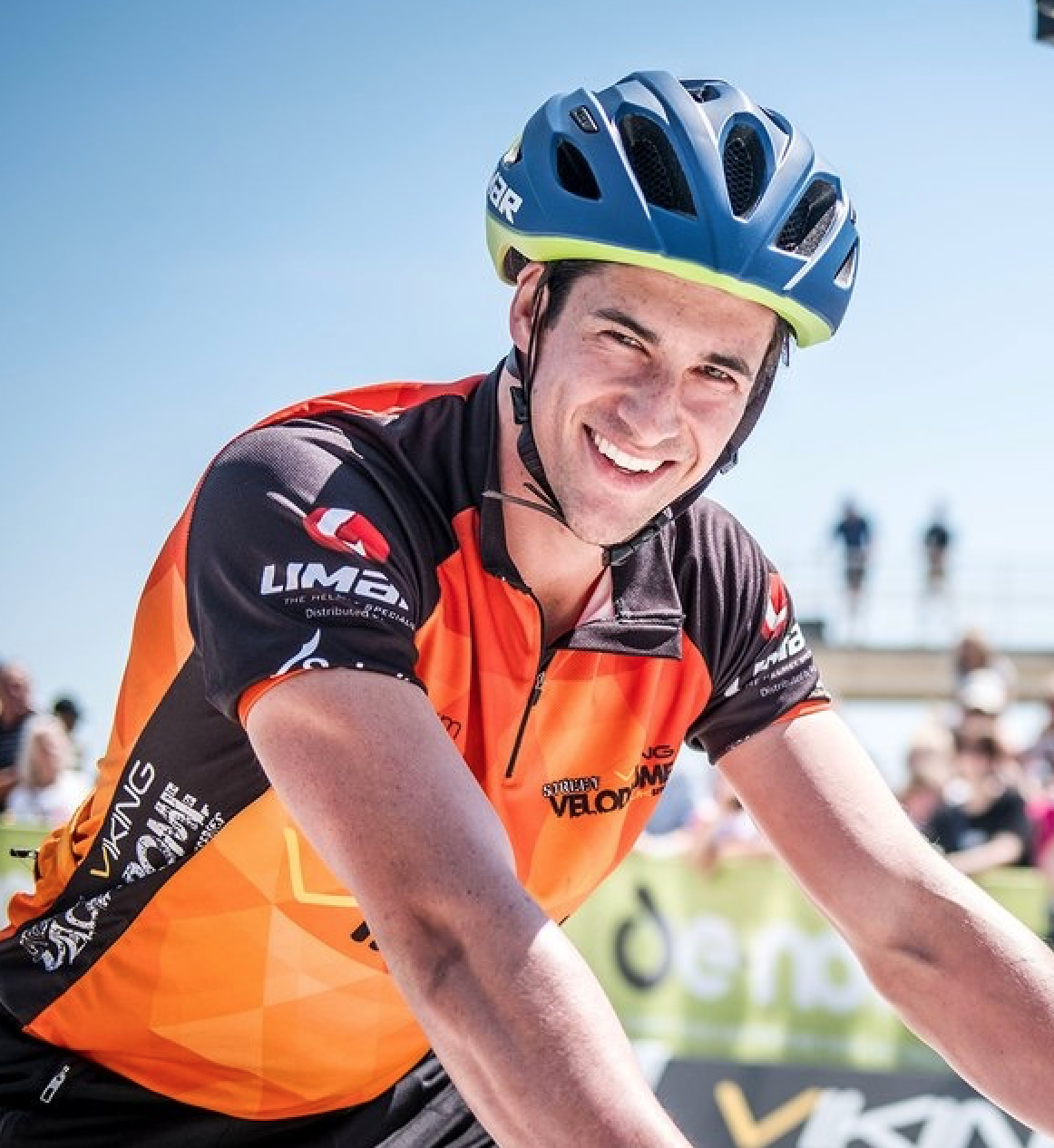
- Born: 13 August 1994 (age 32); Wakefield, West Yorkshire, England
- Father: Jason Robinson
- Relatives: Lewis Tierney (brother)
- Cycling career
- Height: 6 ft 2 in (1.88 m)
- Weight: 176 lb (80 kg)
- Sport: Cycling
- Current team: Hero Cycles
- Discipline: Freestyle Mountain Bikes
- Role: Freestyle
- Rider type: Freestyle, Velodrome, BMX, Streetvelodrome

Patrick Robinson (born 13 August 1994) is a British professional freeride mountain biker. He is the three-time reigning champion for the Street Velodrome cycling discipline.

He has been featured on BT Sports and The Bike channel beating Olympians such as Craig MacLean. He is also a well known favourite in Mexico and Chile participating in Red Bull's urban street racing event, performing his infamous front and back-flip stunts. Robinson is also the founder of his own sports company.

Prior to signing professional, Robinson worked as a Lifeguard for Nuffield Health. He is the son of Jason Robinson and the brother of Lewis Tierney, both professional rugby league footballers.

== Team ==
Patrick Robinson is currently part of the Insync bikes (Hero Cycles) Mountain Bike team. Robinson Signed with Insync Bikes early 2018. Robinson is also sponsored by Poc Sports.

== Achievement ==
2018

- Gold Winner Streetvelodrome tour 2018

2017

- Gold Winner Streetvelodrome tour 2017

2016

- Gold Winner Streetvelodrome tour 2016

2015
