= Darren Fritz =

Australian rugby league footballer

Personal information
- Born: 13 March 1969 (age 57) Rockhampton, Queensland, Australia

Playing information
- Position: Prop, Second-row
Club
Years	Team	Pld	T	G	FG	P
1989–93	Canberra Raiders	53	3	0	0	12
1992–93	Wakefield Trinity	20	9	0	0	36
1994–96	Illawarra Steelers	59	5	0	0	20
1997	North Sydney Bears	5	0	0	0	0
1998–99	Western Suburbs	15	0	0	0	0
	Total	152	17	0	0	68
Representative
Years	Team	Pld	T	G	FG	P
1994	Queensland	3	0	0	0	0

Darren Fritz (born 13 March 1969) is an Australian former professional rugby league footballer who played in the 1980s and 1990s. He played at representative level for Queensland, and at club level for Canberra Raiders, Wakefield Trinity, Illawarra Steelers, North Sydney and Western Suburbs, as a prop, or second-row.

== Playing career ==
A Rockhampton junior, Fritz was a reserve in Canberra's 1991 Grand Final loss to the Penrith Panthers at the Sydney Football Stadium. Fritz played for Wakefield Trinity in the 1992–93 English season. Darren Fritz played right-second-row in Wakefield Trinity's 29–16 victory over Sheffield Eagles in the 1992–93 Yorkshire Cup Final during the 1992–93 season at Elland Road, Leeds on Sunday 18 October 1992. Fritz joined the Illawarra Steelers in the 1994 season. One of the biggest players in the premiership, he played in all 3 matches for Queensland in the 1994 State of Origin series. Fritz's stint with the Steelers ended at the conclusion of the 1996 season. In 1997, Fritz joined the North Sydney Bears. Chronic back injuries saw him released from his contract with Norths.

== Retirement ==
In 1998, Fritz joined Western Suburbs. He played his final two seasons of rugby league with Wests before announcing his retirement at the end of the 1999 season.
