= Lewis Tierney =

Scotland international rugby league footballer

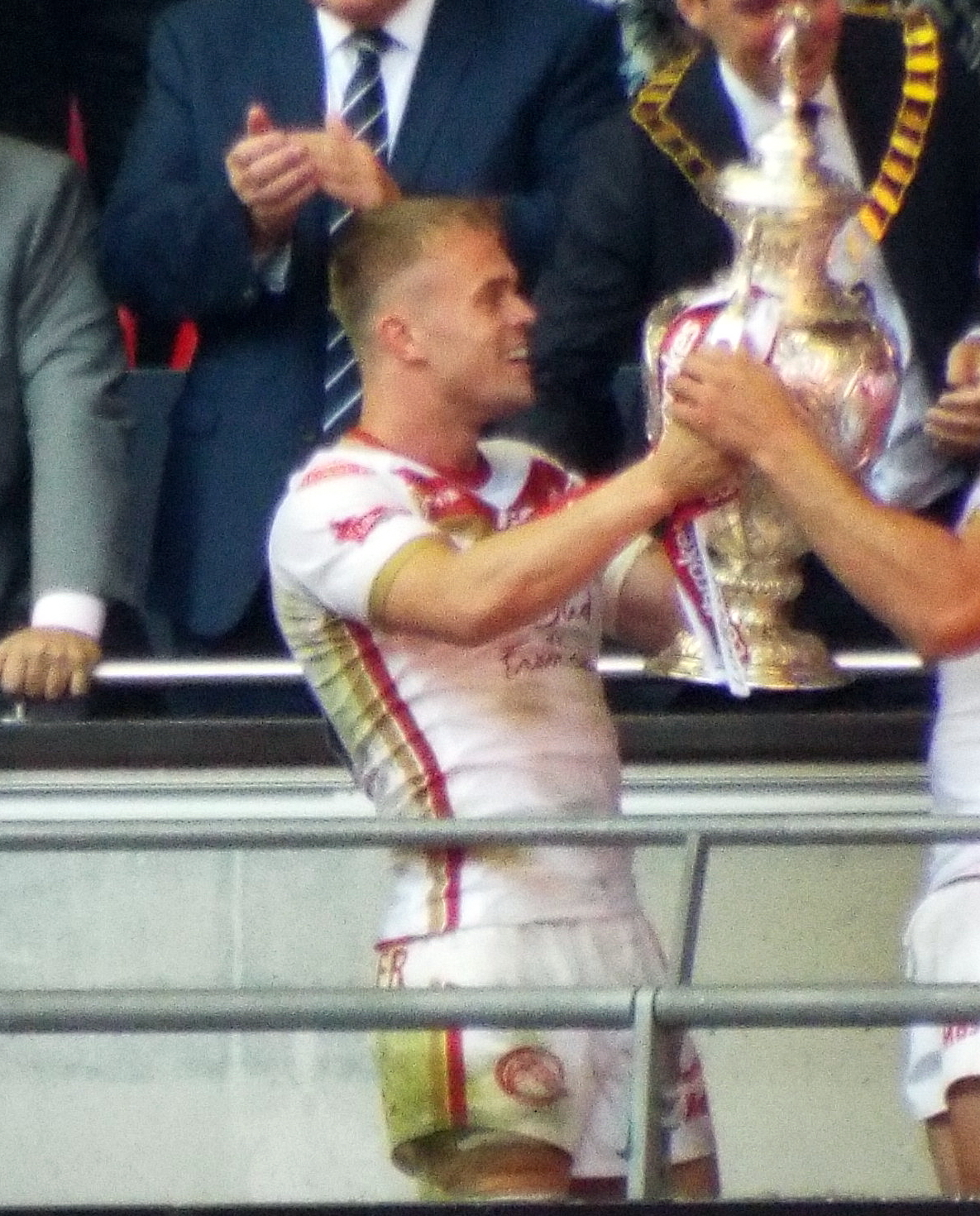

Personal information
- Full name: Lewis Rhys Tierney
- Born: 20 October 1994 (age 31) Wigan, Greater Manchester, England

Playing information
- Height: 5 ft 10 in (1.78 m)
- Weight: 13 st 8 lb (86 kg)
- Position: Wing, Fullback
Club
Years	Team	Pld	T	G	FG	P
2013–17	Wigan Warriors	40	18	0	0	72
2014(DR)	→ Workington Town	12	4	0	0	16
2015(DR)	→ Workington Town	13	6	0	0	24
2017–20	Catalans Dragons	66	22	0	0	88
2021	Leigh Centurions	9	2	0	0	8
	Total	140	52	0	0	208
Representative
Years	Team	Pld	T	G	FG	P
2016–18	Scotland	6	2	0	0	8
- Father: Jason Robinson
- Relatives: Patrick Robinson (brother); Paul Tierney (stepfather)

Lewis Tierney (born 20 October 1994) is a former rugby league footballer who played on the wing or at fullback.

He started his professional career in 2013 with the Wigan Warriors in the Super League, and spent time on loan at Workington Town. He joined the Catalans Dragons in 2017, and played for them in the 2018 Challenge Cup final. He played for Leigh Centurions for one season before announcing his retirement in 2021. Tierney was also a Scotland international, and was capped six times between 2016 and 2018.

== Early life ==
Tierney was born in Wigan, Greater Manchester, England and is the eldest son of Jason Robinson. His parents separated shortly after his birth, and his mother remarried Paul Tierney. His brother Patrick is a professional cyclist.

== Club career ==
=== Wigan Warriors ===
Tierney made his Super League début for Wigan in June 2013, scoring a try in a 33–32 victory over Widnes Vikings. In 2014 and 2015, Tierney spent time on dual registration at Workington Town where he made 25 appearances scoring 6 tries in his time in Cumbria. In 2016 Tierney won his first major piece of silverware after Wigan beat Warrington in the Super League Grand Final; he became the first son to follow his father's footsteps and win a Grand Final.

In July 2017, Tierney was loaned to Catalans Dragons until the end of the season, where he played in their Million Pound Game victory over Leigh to stay in Super League.

=== Catalans Dragons ===
In October 2017, Tierney signed a two-year deal at Catalans after a successful loan period in 2017.

He played in the 2018 Challenge Cup Final victory over the Warrington Wolves at Wembley Stadium.

=== Leigh Centurions ===
On 26 December 2020 it was announced that Tierney had signed for the Leigh Centurions for the 2021 season.

Tierney announced his retirement in November 2021.

== International career ==
Via his heritage, Tierney is eligible to represent both Scotland and Jamaica through his paternal grandmother and paternal grandfather, respectively.

Tierney made his international debut for Scotland in the 2016 Four Nations. He played in two of Scotland's games and scored one try.

== Honours ==
- Super League: 2016
- Million Pound Game: 2017
- World Club Challenge: 2017
- Challenge Cup: 2018
