= Billy Conway (rugby league) =

English rugby league footballer and boxer

Personal information
- Full name: Billy Roy Conway
- Born: 31 January 1967 (age 59) Wakefield, England

Playing information
- Position: Hooker
Club
Years	Team	Pld	T	G	FG	P
1984–97	Wakefield Trinity	276	33	17	0	166
1999–02	Doncaster	65	7	1	3	33
	Total	341	40	18	3	199

Billy Roy Conway (born 31 January 1967) is an English amateur boxer of the 1980s, who was runner-up for the Amateur Boxing Association of England (ABAE) Junior Class-B (48 kg) title against Joe Morgan (Enfield ABC) at The City of Derby, Assembly Rooms, Derby on Saturday 21 March 1981, and former professional rugby league footballer who played in the 1980s, 1990s and 2000s. He played at club level for Wakefield Trinity, Doncaster and Normanton Knights, as a hooker.

== Background ==
Billy Conway's birth was registered in Wakefield, West Riding of Yorkshire, England.

== Playing career ==
=== County Cup Final appearances ===
Billy Conway played hooker, (replaced by substitute Richard Slater) in Wakefield Trinity's 8–11 defeat by Castleford in the 1990–91 Yorkshire Cup Final during the 1990–91 season at Elland Road, Leeds on Sunday 23 September 1990, and played hooker in Wakefield Trinity's 29–16 victory over Sheffield Eagles in the 1992–93 Yorkshire Cup Final during the 1992–93 Rugby Football League season at Elland Road, Leeds on Sunday 18 October 1992.

=== Testimonial match ===
Billy Conway's Testimonial match at Wakefield Trinity took place in 1996.

=== Club career ===
Billy Conway made his début for Wakefield Trinity against Doncaster at Belle Vue, Wakefield on Sunday 28 October 1984.
