= 1992–93 Yorkshire Cup =

Defunct Rugby League competition, held in England

1992 Yorkshire Cup
- Structure: Regional knockout championship
- Teams: 18
- Winners: Wakefield Trinity
- Runners-up: Sheffield Eagles

The 1992 Yorkshire Cup was the eighty-fifth and last occasion on which the Yorkshire Cup competition had been held. Wakefield Trinity won the trophy by beating Sheffield Eagles by the score of 29–16

== Background ==
This season there were no junior/amateur clubs taking part, no new entrants but one "leavers", Scarborough Pirates having folded after just one season and a large loss, and so the total of entries decreased by one from last season, to a total of eighteen.
This in turn resulted in the necessity to continue with a preliminary round to reduce the number of clubs entering the first round to sixteen.

== Competition and results ==
=== Preliminary round ===
Involved 2 matches and 4 clubs

Game No	Fixture Date	Home team	Score	Away team	Venue	Attendance	Notes	Ref
P1	Sun 23 Aug 1992	Castleford Tigers	10–16	Bradford Northern	Wheldon Road	4988		
P2	Sun 23 Aug 1992	Huddersfield	36–12	Ryedale-York	Fartown	1619	(Note: The first Yorkshire Cup match played by Huddersfield since moving into Huddersfield Town's Leeds Road stadium) (Note: Last ever competitive fixture at Fartown)	

=== Round 1 ===
Involved 8 matches (with no byes) and 16 clubs

Game No	Fixture Date	Home team	Score	Away team	Venue	Attendance	Notes	Ref
1	Fri 11 Sep 1992	Sheffield Eagles	34–14	Halifax	Don Valley Stadium	3596		
2	Sun 13 Sep 1992	Bradford Northern	34–22	Bramley	Odsal	3108		
3	Sun 13 Sep 1992	Featherstone Rovers	40–8	Dewsbury	Post Office Road	2468	(Note: Dewsbury had moved to Batley's Mount Pleasant while awaiting construction of their new stadium, but played no Yorkshire Cup matches at this temporary venue)	
4	Sun 13 Sep 1992	Huddersfield	16–8	Batley	Leeds Road	1714		
5	Sun 13 Sep 1992	Hull F.C.	14–6	Hull Kingston Rovers	Boulevard	8825		
6	Sun 13 Sep 1992	Leeds	28–20	Hunslet	Headingley	5952		
7	Sun 13 Sep 1992	Nottingham City	4–30	Keighley Cougars	Harvey Hadden Stadium	327		
8	Sun 13 Sep 1992	Wakefield Trinity	54–14	Doncaster	Belle Vue	3229		

=== Round 2 - Quarter-finals ===
Involved 4 matches and 8 clubs

Game No	Fixture Date	Home team	Score	Away team	Venue	Attendance	Notes	Ref
1	Wed 23 Sep 1992	Bradford Northern	8–17	Sheffield Eagles	Odsal	3333		
2	Wed 23 Sep 1992	Featherstone Rovers	18–8	Huddersfield	Post Office Road	2385		
3	Wed 23 Sep 1992	Hull F.C.	26–16	Leeds	Boulevard	6609		
4	Wed 23 Sep 1992	Wakefield Trinity	22–16	Keighley Cougars	Belle Vue	2508		

=== Round 3 – Semi-finals ===
Involved 2 matches and 4 clubs

Game No	Fixture Date	Home team	Score	Away team	Venue	Attendance	Notes	Ref
1	Tue 06 Oct 1992	Sheffield Eagles	12–8	Hull F.C.	Don Valley Stadium	3017		
2	Wed 07 Oct 1992	Featherstone Rovers	8–22	Wakefield Trinity	Post Office Road	5544		

=== Final ===
The match was played at Elland Road, Leeds. The attendance was 7,918. Nigel Wright was the man of the match, becoming the youngest ever recipient of the White Rose Trophy.

18 October 1992

Wakefield Trinity	29 – 16	Sheffield Eagles
Tries: Slater, Bagnall, Spencer, Mason, Price; Goals: Benson (3), Wright; Drop goals: Wright		Tries: McGuire (2), Gamson; Goals: Mycoe (2)

Elland Road, Leeds
Attendance: 7,918
Referee: Russell Smith (Castleford)
White Rose Trophy: Nigel Wright

==== Teams and scorers ====
Wakefield Trinity	№	Sheffield Eagles
	Teams	
Gary Spencer	1	Garry Jack
David Jones	2	Mark Gamson
Andrew "Andy" Mason	3	Richard Price
Peter Benson	4	David Mycoe
Andrew "Andy" Wilson	5	David Plange
Nigel Wright	6	Mark Aston
Geoff Bagnall	7	Tim Lumb
Mark Webster	8	Paul Broadbent
Nigel Bell	9	Mick Cook
John Glancy	10	Dale Laughton
Gary Price	11	Bruce McGuire
Darren Fritz	12	Paul Carr
Richard Slater	13	Anthony Farrell
	Subs	
Richard Goddard	14	Andy Young
Billy Conway	15	Hugh Waddell
David Topliss	Coach	Gary Hetherington

Scoring - Try = four points - Goal = two points - Drop goal = one point

=== The road to success ===
The following chart excludes any preliminary round fixtures/results

First round
Featherstone Rovers	40
Dewsbury	8
Huddersfield	16
Batley	8
Wakefield Trinity	54
Doncaster	14
Nottingham City	4
Keighley Cougars	30
Bradford Northern	34
Bramley	22
Sheffield Eagles	34
Halifax	14
Hull F.C.	14
Hull Kingston Rovers	6
Leeds	28
Hull Kingston Rovers	20

Second round
Featherstone Rovers	18
Huddersfield	8
Wakefield Trinity	22
Keighley Cougars	16
Bradford Northern	8
Sheffield Eagles	17
Hull F.C.	26
Leeds	16

Semi-finals
Featherstone Rovers	8
Wakefield Trinity	22
Sheffield Eagles	12
Hull F.C.	8

Final
Wakefield Trinity	29
Sheffield Eagles	16

== See also ==
- 1992–93 Rugby Football League season
- Rugby league county cups
