= Clash of Codes =

Sports match played between two teams who play different codes of the same sport

Clash of Codes is a term in sports used to describe a match played between two teams that play different codes of the same sport. Games are usually played with the codes changing at half-time, or across two matches of the different codes with an aggregate score.

Usually associated with the codes of football, and especially rugby, several games have occurred throughout history. Aston Villa Football Club's first ever match in 1874 was arranged against Aston, St Mary's. St Mary's played rugby whereas Villa had chosen to follow the Sheffield Code. A compromise was reached whereby, using a round ball, the teams played rugby in the first half and association football in the second. After a goalless first-half, Villa's forward Jack Hughes scored the only goal off the rebound when the St Mary's goalkeeper spilled his first effort.

== American Football vs Rugby League ==
=== Jacksonville Axemen vs Jacksonville Knights ===
The first clash of codes match between American football and rugby league was played between Jacksonville Axemen and Jacksonville Knights. The league side Axemen defeated the American football side Knights 38–27.

== Rugby League vs Rugby Union ==
=== Kangaroos vs Wallabies ===
In September 1909, the national league and union sides of Australia played a four-match test series, resulting in two wins a piece for either side. The exact format and rules of the game are unknown. All games were played at the Agricultural Oval in Sydney.

4 September 1909 (Game 1)

Australia RL	29 – 26	Australia RU

8 September 1909 (Game 2)

Australia RL	21 – 34	Australia RU

11 September 1909 (Game 3)

Australia RL	6 – 15	Australia RU

18 September 1909 (Game 4)

Australia RL	8 – 6	Australia RU

=== Bath vs Wigan ===
The first clash of codes game in the UK between rugby league and rugby union received a lot of media attention and was labelled as The Clash of the Codes. The game was between Bath and Wigan and saw league side Wigan win with an aggregate score of 101–50 across two games.

=== St Helens vs Sale Sharks ===
In January 2003, St. Helens took on Sale Sharks in a single game played at Knowsley Road, which had one half under league rules and the other under union rules. At the time Sale had the been a professional side for almost a decade which helped improve both strength and fitness that was necessary for them to adapt to the constant tackling required in rugby league, as well as being able to call on the services of a number of ex-league players, most notably Jason Robinson, who had played for Wigan in 1996, factors which were thought to have resulted in a much closer game compared to that of Bath vs Wigan. Having built up a 41–0 lead under union rules, St Helens were restricted to only 39 points under league rules.

27 January 2003

St. Helens	39 – 41	Sale Sharks
Tries: Joynt 1 Maden 1 Newlove 1 Gardner 2 Kirkpatrick 1 Hooper 1 Goals: Long 2	Report	Tries: 1 Cueto; 2 Hanley; 2 Davies; 1 Turner; 1 Schofield; Goals: 3 Wigglesworth

Knowsley Road, St. Helens
Attendance: 12,257
Referee: M. Pearson

St Helens	Sale Sharks

=== Salford Red Devils vs Sale Sharks ===
In February 2014, eleven years after the first dual code single game, it was announced that the AJ Bell Stadium would see another fixture, scheduled for 26 August 2014, between the facility's two tenants, Salford Red Devils and Sale Sharks, to raise money for various charities. However, in July the same year it was subsequently announced that the game was being postponed owing to the difficulties of the two clubs' respective league schedules - the original date was between two important fixtures towards the end of Salford's league season, while Sale had yet to start their own league season.

=== Western Suburbs vs Randwick ===
In October 2015, Western Suburbs Magpies played Randwick DRUFC in Australia's first Clash of Codes games of domestic teams in what was described as "hybrid rugby". The game was 13-a-side and featured league rules when in the teams own half and union rules when in the opposition half, as well as 60-second transitions. The league side won 47–19, with union points for tries, and league points for conversions, penalties, and drop goals.

The company that organised the match enquired about organising a game being the England rugby league and rugby union team in 2025.

=== 745 Game ===
The 745 game is an annual rugby union and rugby league cross code game to raise funds for motor neuron disease charities. The numbers used in the title represent the jersey worn by three rugby players who had/have MND: Rob Burrow (#7), Ed Slater (#4), and Doddie Weir (#5). The game is 13-a-side and operated with unlimited tackles in the attacking team's own half but six after halfway, uncontested scrums and line-outs, five points for a try, two for conversion, and two for a drop goal. Proceeds from the match are donated to the Rob Burrow Discretionary Trust, The 4Ed Foundation and the My Name'5 Doddie Foundation.

==== First 745 game ====
The first 745 game was the first Clash of Codes game in England for over a decade. It was played on 17 November 2024 at Headingley Rugby Stadium, Leeds featuring rugby league legends against rugby union legends.

17 November 2024

Rob Burrow's Rugby League Legends	33–21	Ed Slater's Rugby Union Legends
	Report

Headingley Rugby Stadium, Leeds
Attendance: 10,044
Referee: Ben Thaler (Rugby League) & Frank Murphy (Rugby Union)

League team

Aaron Murphy, Adrian Morley, Anthony Thackeray, Ben Westwood, Bob Beswick, Danny McGuire, Danny Brough, Darrell Griffin, Ewan Dowes, Gareth Ellis, Gary Connolly, Jacques O’Neill, Keith Senior, Kyle Wood, Kylie Leuluai, Luke Ambler, Luke Gale, Matt Diskin, Paul McShane, Ryan Atkins, Scott Murrell, Tom Minns, Wayne Goodwin, Wayne Price

Union team

Alex Waller, Andy Forsyth, Anthony Allen, Billy Twelvetrees, Ethan Waller, Danny Cipriani, Dom Waldouck, Finlay Stewart, Geordan Murphy, Graham Kitchener, Guy Thompson, Joe Simpson, Josh Matavesi, Johne Murphy, Kian Stewart, Kyle Trainer, Lee Dickson, Matt Banahan, Matt Cornwell, Matt Garvey, Michael Holford, Micky Young, Paddy McAllister, Phil Dowson, Richard Hibbard, Tom Cruse, Tommy Bell, Tom Youngs, Tom Wood, Tom Johnson

==== Second 745 game ====
In January 2025, it was announced that the game would be returning for a second year, this time being played at Kingsholm Stadium, Gloucester. In October 2025, it was announced that the game would be broadcast live in the UK on TNT Sports.

9 November 2025

Ed Slater's Rugby Union Legends	43–45	Rob Burrow's Rugby League Legends
	Report

Kingsholm Stadium, Gloucester
Attendance: 9,117
Referee: Ben Thaler (Rugby League) & Luke Pearce (Rugby Union)

==== Third 745 game ====
In July 2026, it was announced that the game would return for a third year. The game will be taken to its third venue, Welford Road in Leicester, home of rugby union side Leicester Tigers. It will be held on 27 September 2026 and will be a double-header, following on for Leicester's first Premiership home fixture of the season against Saracens.

== See also ==
- International rules football – a hybrid code of football combining elements of Australian rules football and Gaelic football
- List of dual-code rugby internationals – list of rugby footballers who have represented their nation in both league and union
