= Adedayo Adebayo =

Nigerian-British rugby union player

- Born: Adedayo Adeyemi Adebayo; 30 November 1970 (age 55) Ibadan, Nigeria
- Height: 1.85 m (6 ft 1 in)
- Weight: 95 kg (14 st 13 lb)

Rugby union career
- Position: Wing
Senior career
Years	Team	Apps	(Points)
1989 – 2001	Bath	259	(95)
2001 – 2002	Parma		
- Correct as of 8 Oct 2006
International career
Years	Team	Apps	(Points)
1996–1998	England	9	(10)
- Correct as of 8 Oct 2006
National sevens team
Years	Team		Comps
1993 – 1999	England		1993 Sevens World Cup

Adedayo Adeyemi Adebayo (born 30 November 1970 in Ibadan, Nigeria) is a rugby union footballer, who played on the wing for England 9 times between 1996 and 1998. He played club rugby for Bath and Parma and then went on to coach the Scottish-based sevens side, Bone Steelers. He started for Bath in the victorious 1998 Heineken Cup Final as they defeated Brive.

== Career ==
Adebayo made his international debut on 23 November 1996 against Italy, a match which England went on to win 54–21. His final appearance in an England shirt was on 22 March 1998 against Scotland.

He was a member of the England sevens squad which won the inaugural World Cup Sevens in Scotland in 1993. He turned and twisted to bring off a memorable tackle, that helped England reach the final.

He is the CEO and founder of Premier Lifestyle, a corporate hospitality company.
