= Nigel Wright (rugby league) =

Former GB & England international rugby league footballer and coach

Personal information
- Full name: Nigel Wright
- Born: 8 November 1973 (age 52)

Playing information
- Position: Stand-off, Loose forward
Club
Years	Team	Pld	T	G	FG	P
1990–93	Wakefield Trinity	33	6	12	6	54
1993–98	Wigan	36	11	0	4	48
1994–95	→ Wakefield Trinity (loan)	19	6	53	11	141
1998–2000	Huddersfield	10	1	0	0	4
	Total	98	24	65	21	247
Representative
Years	Team	Pld	T	G	FG	P
1993–95	Great Britain U21	4	0	0	0	0
1995	England	1	0	0	1	1

Coaching information
Club
Years	Team	Gms	W	D	L	W%
2011	Barrow Raiders

Nigel Wright (born 8 November 1973) is an English former professional rugby league footballer who played in the 1990s and 2000s, and has coached in the 2010s. He played at representative level for England, and at club level for Stanley Rangers ARLFC, Wakefield Trinity, Wigan and Huddersfield Giants as a stand-off, or loose forward, and coached for Barrow Raiders.

== Playing career ==
=== Club career ===
Wright is the joint-fifth youngest player (along with Neil Fox) to make his début for Wakefield Trinity aged 16-years and 3-months in 1990.

Wright played stand-off and scored a goal, and a drop goal in Trinity's 29–16 victory over Sheffield Eagles in the 1992–93 Yorkshire Cup Final at Elland Road, Leeds on 18 October 1992.

In 1993, Wigan paid Wakefield a fee of £140,000 for Wright, which was a record transfer fee for a teenager. A series of ankle injuries limited his impact at Wigan, and was released by the club at the end of the 1998 season.

After playing one season for Huddersfield Giants, injuries forced Wright to retire prematurely.

=== International honours ===
Wright won a cap for England while at Wakefield Trinity in 1995 against France.

== Coaching career ==
In 2009, Wright joined the coaching staff at Warrington Wolves as an assistant to James Lowes.

Wright was named as assistant to Garry Schofield at Barrow Raiders ahead of the 2011 season. In March 2011, Wright took over as head coach following the departure of Schofield. He left the club in July 2011.
