= Lee Hansen (rugby league) =

Tonga international rugby league footballer

Personal information
- Full name: Liuaki Hansen
- Born: 23 July 1968 (age 57)

Playing information
- Position: Prop
Club
Years	Team	Pld	T	G	FG	P
1991–94	Leigh	65	2	0	0	8
1994–97	Widnes	82	4	0	0	16
1997–98	Wigan Warriors	26	0	0	0	0
1998	Keighley Cougars	20	2	0	0	8
1999–00	Widnes Vikings	66	3	0	0	12
2001–03	Swinton Lions	66	2	0	0	8
2004–05	Rochdale Hornets	29	0	0	0	0
2006	Blackpool Panthers	6	0	0	0	0
	Total	360	13	0	0	52
Representative
Years	Team	Pld	T	G	FG	P
1995–99	Tonga	3	0	0	0	0

Liuaki "Lee" Hansen (born 23 July 1968) is a former professional rugby league footballer who played in the 1990s and 2000s who played for Leigh Centurions, Widnes Vikings (two spells), Wigan Warriors, Keighley Cougars, Swinton Lions, Rochdale Hornets and Blackpool Panthers.

Hansen was a Tongan international and played at the 1995 Rugby League World Cup.

== Career ==
Hansen started his career at Leigh, making 65 appearances for the club between 1991 and 1994. Following the club's relegation at the end of the 1993–94 season, he was signed by Widnes for an estimated fee of £40,000.

In April 1997, he was signed by Wigan Warriors in exchange for Sean Long and a fee of £80,000.

In April 1998, he was signed by Keighley Cougars.
