= Matt Knowles (rugby league) =

British rugby league player

Personal information
- Full name: Matthew Knowles
- Born: 8 December 1975 (age 49)

Playing information
- Position: Prop, Second-row
Club
Years	Team	Pld	T	G	FG	P
1994–96	Wigan	9	0	0	0	0
	Swinton Lions
	Total	9	0	0	0	0
- Source: RLP

Matt Knowles (born 8 December 1975) is a rugby league footballer who played at club level for Wigan and Swinton Lions.

Knowles started his career at Wigan, making his début for the club in 1994. He went on to play nine times for the club, including three appearances in the inaugural Super League season. He signed for Swinton Lions in 1997.
