= Craig Murdock =

English rugby league footballer and sports broadcaster

Personal information
- Full name: Craig Murdock
- Born: 24 October 1973 (age 52) Whitehaven, Cumbria, England

Playing information
- Position: Scrum-half
Club
Years	Team	Pld	T	G	FG	P
1993–98	Wigan	68	23	1	0	94
1998–99	Hull Sharks	27	8	0	2	34
2000	Salford City Reds	2	0	0	0	0
2001	Keighley Cougars	6	2	0	0	8
2001–03	Hull Kingston Rovers	35	13	0	0	52
	Total	138	46	1	2	188
- Source: RLP

Craig Murdock (born 24 October 1973) is an English former professional rugby league footballer who played as a Scrum-half. Murdock played for Hensingham ARLFC (in Hensingham, Whitehaven), Wigan, Hull Sharks, Salford City Reds and Hull Kingston Rovers.

== Playing career ==
Born in Cumbria, Murdock started his professional career with Wigan in 1993 after being signed from amateur side Hensingham. He scored 23 tries in 68 appearances for the club, and took part in the Clash of the Codes match against Bath, scoring two tries in the match played under rugby union rules.

In 1998, he joined Hull Sharks, initially on loan before signing a permanent deal. He also went on to play for Salford City Reds and Hull Kingston Rovers

== Media career ==
After his playing career ended, Murdock worked as a commentator for BBC Radio Humberside for almost a decade, but was forced to leave the role in 2014 due to a "conflict of interest" with his work as a player agent. He was subsequently employed by the Hull Daily Mail as a columnist.

== Honours ==
- RFL Championship: 1994–95, 1995–96
- Premiership: 1996
