= Jason Robinson (rugby) =

Great Britain and England dual-code international rugby footballer

Jason Robinson OBE
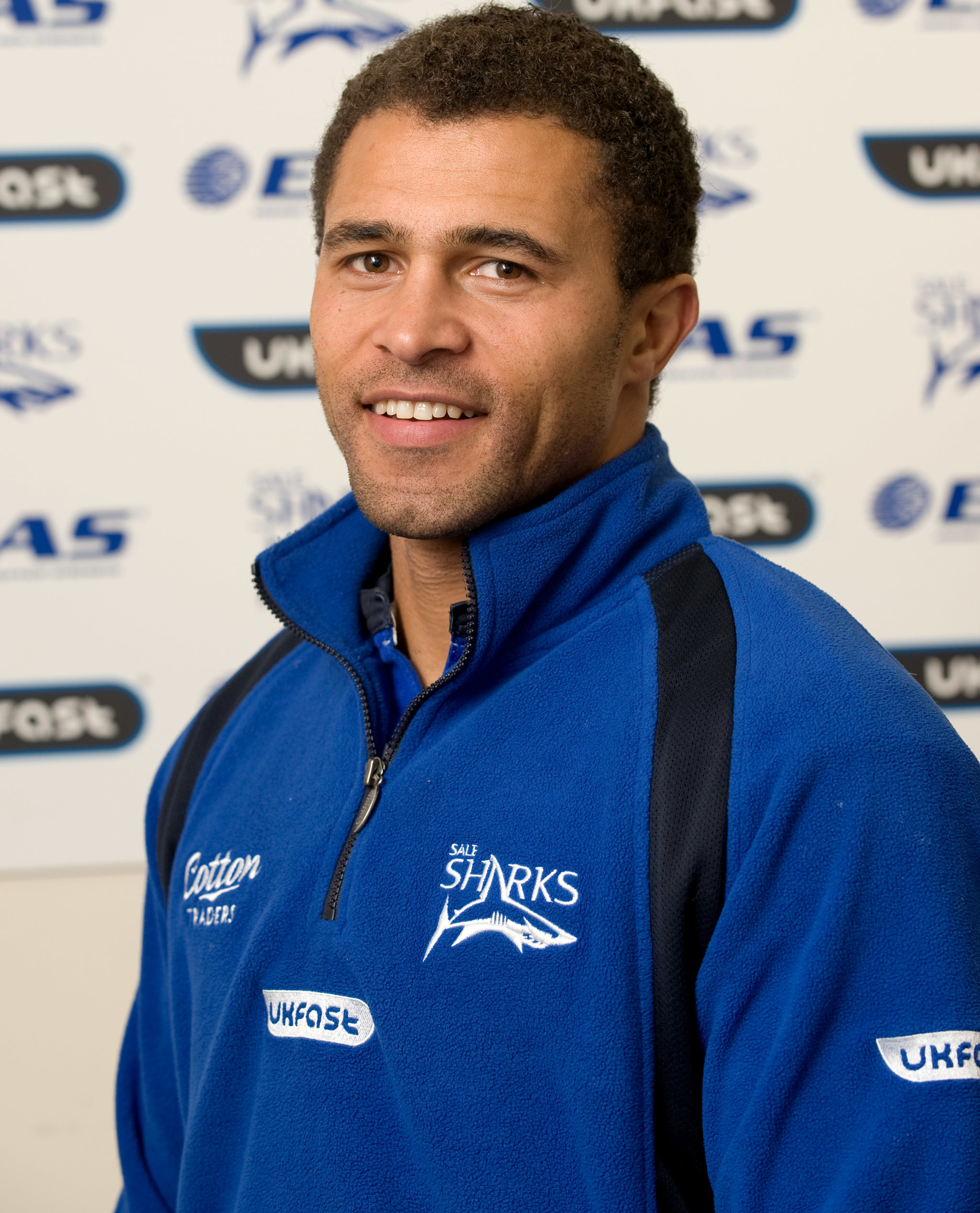

Personal information
- Born: Jason Thorpe Robinson; 30 July 1974 (age 52) Leeds, Yorkshire, England
- Height: 5 ft 8 in (1.73 m)
- Weight: 12 st 11 lb (81 kg)

Playing information
- Position: Fullback, Wing
Club
Years	Team	Pld	T	G	FG	P
1991–2000	Wigan	302	167	0	1	685
Representative
Years	Team	Pld	T	G	FG	P
1993–99	Great Britain	12	8	0	0	32
1995–96	England	7	5	0	0	20
1997	Rest of the World	4	1	0	0	4

Rugby union career
- Position(s): Wing, Fullback, Centre
- Current team: Fylde
Senior career
Years	Team	Apps	(Points)
1996	Bath	14	(35)
2000–2007	Sale Sharks	159	(248)
2010–2011	Fylde	3	(5)
- Correct as of 27 July 2010
International career
Years	Team	Apps	(Points)
2001–2007	England	51	(140)
2001 & 2005	British & Irish Lions	5	(10)
- Correct as of 13 February 2007
- Relatives: Patrick Robinson (son); Lewis Tierney (son)

Jason Thorpe Robinson OBE (born 30 July 1974) is an English former rugby league and rugby union footballer who played in the 1990s and 2000s. A dual-code international, he represented Great Britain and England in rugby league, and England and the British & Irish Lions in rugby union.

In rugby league he played for Wigan and won 12 caps for Great Britain and 7 for England.

He won 51 international caps for England and 5 for the British & Irish Lions in rugby union. He was part of the 2003 World Cup-winning England team, and was the first black man to captain England.

Playing as a wing in both codes, and sometimes a fullback in rugby union, Robinson was noted for his speed and acceleration, side-step and ability to beat defenders.

== Rugby league ==
Born on 30 July 1974 in Leeds, West Yorkshire, Robinson began playing rugby league as a child at Hunslet Boys Club and then Hunslet Parkside. He wanted to play for his hometown professional team Leeds, but the club were not interested in signing him at the time. He subsequently signed a professional contract with Wigan when he turned 17 in 1991. His form quickly establishing him in Wigan's first team, as a teenager he was touted as a future halfback or loose forward. He was selected to play on the wing for Wigan against the visiting Brisbane Broncos in the 1992 World Club Challenge.

Robinson played in Wigan's 5–4 victory over St. Helens in the 1992 Lancashire Cup Final at Knowsley Road, St. Helens on Sunday 18 October 1992.

He played and scored a try in Wigan's 15–8 victory over Bradford Northern in the 1992–93 Regal Trophy Final during the 1992–93 season at Elland Road, Leeds on Saturday 23 January 1993, played in the 2–33 defeat by Castleford in the 1993–94 Regal Trophy Final during the 1993–94 season at Headingley Rugby Stadium, Leeds on Saturday 22 January 1994, played in the 40–10 victory over Warrington in the 1994–95 Regal Trophy Final during the 1994–95 season at Alfred McAlpine Stadium, Huddersfield on Saturday28 January 1995, and played in the 25–16 victory over St. Helens in the 1995–96 Regal Trophy Final during the 1995–96 season at Alfred McAlpine Stadium, Huddersfield on Saturday 13 January 1996.

In 1993, Robinson played in his first Challenge Cup Final, with Wigan defeating Widnes. Later that year at age 19 Robinson was first selected to represent Great Britain on the wing against New Zealand.

After the 1993–94 Rugby Football League season, Robinson travelled with defending champions Wigan to Brisbane, playing on the wing in their 1994 World Club Challenge victory over Australian premiers, the Brisbane Broncos.

In 1995, Robinson was offered a 4-year deal worth a record £1.25 million by the Australian Rugby League to play for the South Sydney Rabbitohs at the end of 1997's Super League II. He recovered from a foot injury to play in Wigan's 30–10 Challenge Cup Final victory over Leeds, scoring two tries and earning himself the Lance Todd Trophy as man-of-the-match.

Robinson played for England in the 1995 World Cup Final on the wing but Australia won the match and retained the Cup.

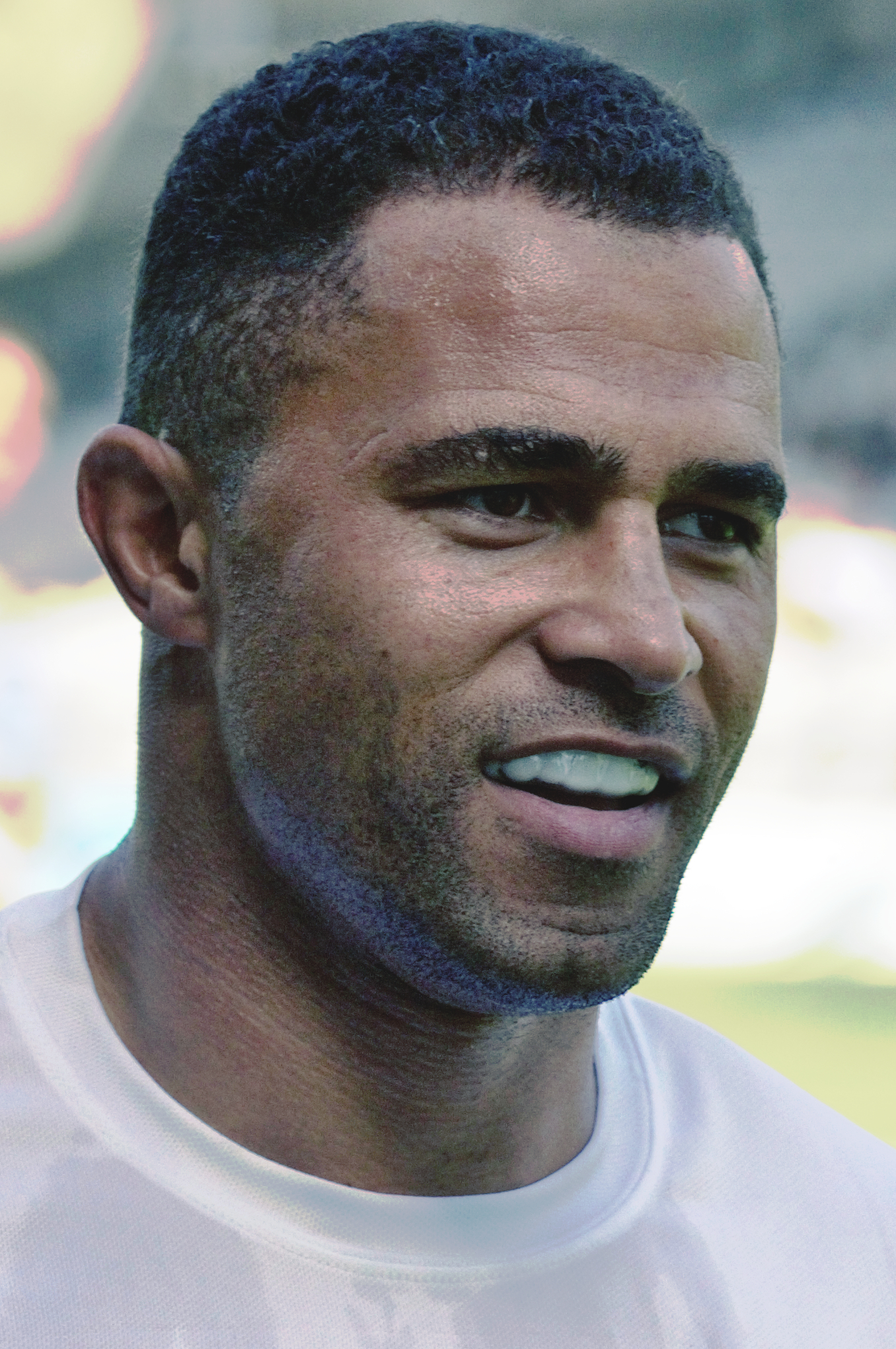
Jason Robinson

In May 1996, Robinson played for Wigan in a special two-game, cross code challenge series against Bath, then the leading club side in English rugby union. Robinson scored twice in the first game, an 82–6 victory for Wigan under league rules, as well as playing in the union game, which ended 44–19 to Bath. Following the cross-code challenge series, a number of Wigan's players, including Robinson, elected to take advantage of the fact that rugby union had turned professional, and ended its ban on players that had played rugby league, by signing short-term contracts to play union during the Super League off-season. Robinson joined Bath and played 14 games for the side between September 1996 and January 1997. At the end of the first Super League season, Robinson was named on the wing in the 1996 Super League Dream Team.

In the midst of the Super League war, Robinson played a one-off international for a 'Rest of the World' team in their 28–8 loss against the Australian Rugby League's Kangaroos in mid-1997. With his contracted move to Sydney set to take place at the conclusion of the 1997's Super League II, Robinson had had a change of heart and Wigan were able to negotiate his release from the ARL's contract so he could continue playing for his club. He then scored a try for Great Britain in each of the three matches against Australia in the post-season Super League Test series.

In 1998, Robinson scored Wigan's only try in Super League's first ever Grand Final, which the Cherry & Whites won. As a result, he was awarded the Harry Sunderland Trophy as man-of-the-match. He was also named on the wing in the 1998 season's Super League Dream Team, and again in 1999 and 2000.

Robinson played at fullback in the Wigan Warriors' defeat by St. Helens in the 2000 Super League Grand Final. Days after the match, it was announced that he had signed for Sale Sharks rugby union club, with Robinson citing the lack of anything left to prove in rugby league and the desire to represent England and the British Lions in the 15-man code.

== Rugby union ==
He made his debut for Sale Sharks against Coventry in November 2000. In the 2005/6 season he became the first person to have won both the Guinness Premiership, and the Super League trophies.

=== England ===
Robinson made his England début as a substitute against Italy in February 2001, having played in the A match against Wales at Wrexham a fortnight earlier. In doing so he was only the second man ever to play rugby union for England after having first played rugby league for Great Britain (the first having been Barrie-Jon Mather in 1999).

He scored 30 tries in 56 international matches, including a try in the 2003 World Cup Final against Australia. He played in all seven of England's World Cup games in 2003.

In the 2004 Six Nations, he scored three tries playing as a centre in the opening match against Italy and was named Man of the Match. Robinson chose to opt out of the 2004 summer tour to recover.

After Lawrence Dallaglio's international retirement in 2005, Jonny Wilkinson was initially appointed captain. However, Wilkinson was injured for the 2005 autumn internationals and Robinson was appointed captain. He was the 118th captain of England, the first mixed-race player and the first former professional rugby league footballer to captain England. In his first appearance as captain, he scored a hat-trick of tries in a 70–0 rout of Canada.

=== British & Irish Lions ===
Robinson was selected by the British & Irish Lions for their 2001 tour of Australia, and was one of the outstanding players in the side that won the first Test in Brisbane 29–13. In that game he sidestepped past Australian fullback Chris Latham. He went on to score another try in the last Test.

Robinson was again called up to the Lions' 2005 tour of New Zealand. He was excused from travelling with the bulk of the touring party to spend time with his wife, who was expecting the couple's fourth child in August. Throughout his career, he normally brought his wife and children along when he went on a tour, but her pregnancy made this impossible for the 2005 tour. He joined the team on 7 June, well in advance of the first New Zealand test on 25 June.

=== International retirement ===
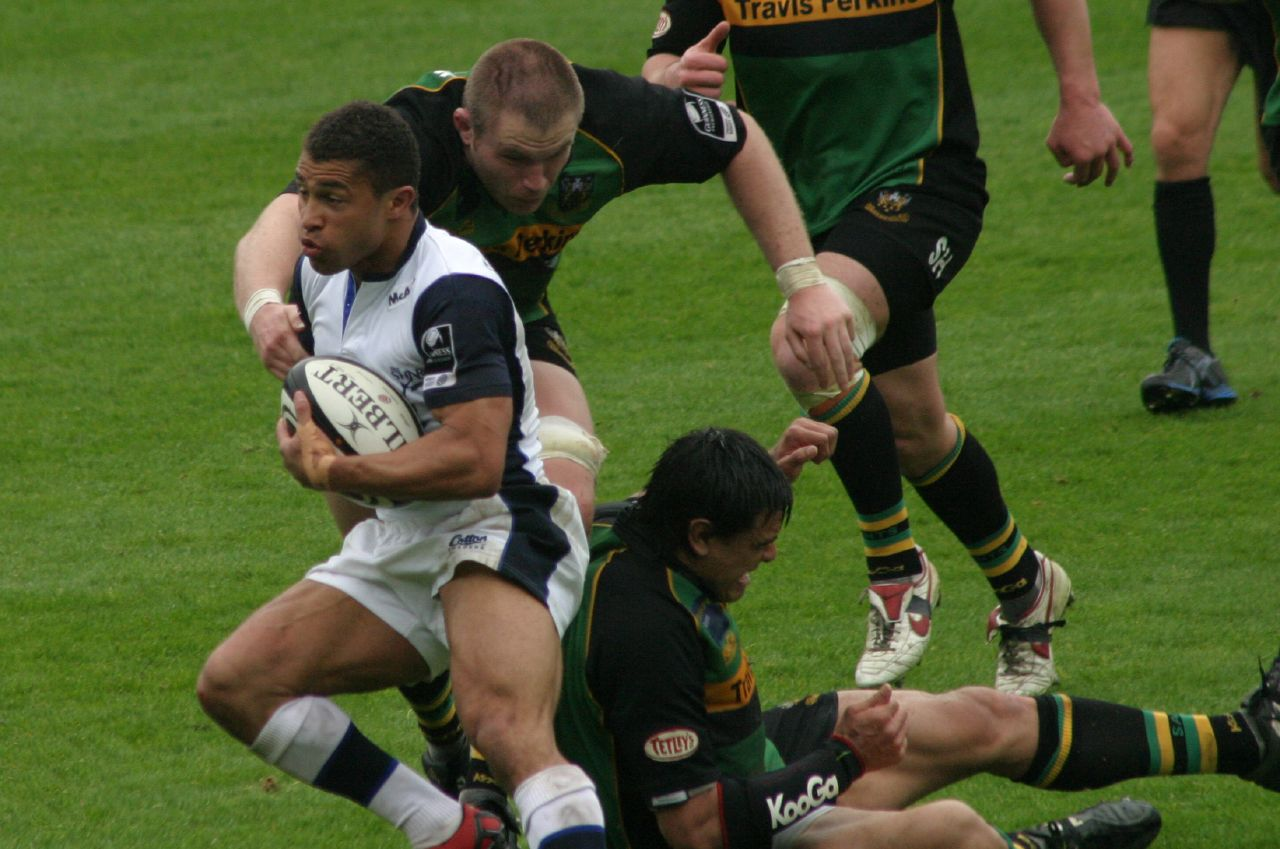
Robinson playing for Sale Sharks towards the end of the 2005–2006 Guinness Premiership in which he led the club to their first Premiership title.

On 24 September 2005, Robinson announced his retirement from international rugby union, stating that he wished to spend more time with his family. In the 2005–2006 season, Robinson led his club Sale Sharks to their first ever Premiership title.

=== Return ===
Robinson returned to the England set-up for the 2007 Six Nations tournament, following the decision of new head coach Brian Ashton to recall him to provide the leadership and winning quality the team had lacked in the past year, ending a 15-month absence from the international scene. He scored two tries on his return in England's opening victory over Scotland. He also scored another try against the Italians the following week.

On 2 April 2007, Robinson announced he would retire from playing club rugby at the end of the 2006/07 season. He also announced he would participate, if required, in England's summer friendlies and the 2007 Rugby World Cup, before retiring completely from the sport. His last game for Sale Sharks came at home to Bath on Friday 13 April. Robinson said, "I have thoroughly enjoyed my time at Sale Sharks but the time has come to move on to other things. I want my last game for Sale Sharks to be a home game (v Bath) and want to be able to say a big thank you to the supporters of this great club."

On 13 April 2007, Robinson ended his club career with a match-winning try 6 seconds from time as Sale edged past Bath in the Guinness Premiership. In the last play of the game, he received the ball 30 metres out and could not be stopped. He was then given the opportunity to convert the try, only to miss by a matter of inches past the left post.

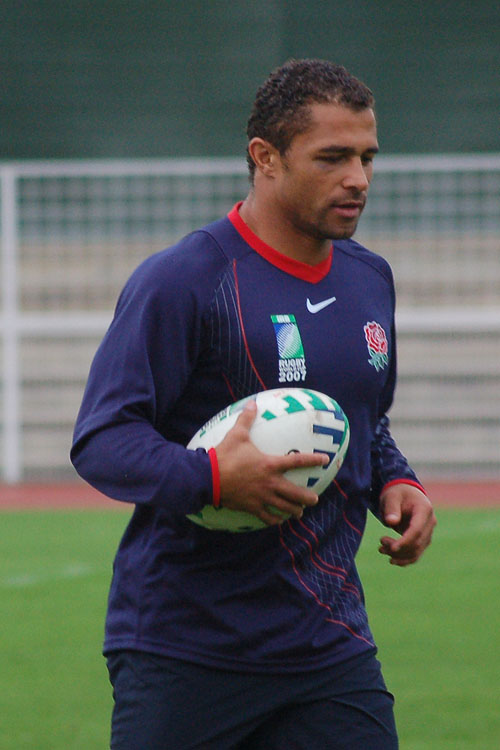
Robinson training in 2007

On 14 September 2007, Robinson left the field to a standing ovation during England's defeat by South Africa, with a hamstring injury. This kept him out of England's remaining two group games, but he resumed full training in time to be available to play in the knock-out stages. In the quarter-final against Australia, Robinson returned to the side as full back and played his part in a tense 12–10 victory over the Wallabies. In the semi-final victory over France, his 50th cap, he was given the honour of leading out the England team. Robinson's last game for England came in the 2007 World Cup Final defeat by South Africa, when he was forced to leave the field during the second half, due to an injury. He was one of only four players to have started both the 2003 and 2007 Finals, the other three being Jonny Wilkinson, Ben Kay, and Phil Vickery.

Robinson was selected to play for the Barbarians at Twickenham on 1 December 2007, showing many of his trademark runs and received a standing ovation as he left the field for the last time in the 68th minute of the match.

=== Fylde ===
On 26 July 2010, Robinson came out of retirement at the age of 35 to play for National League 2 North side; Fylde. He announced his final retirement on 7 July 2011.

=== International tries ===
==== England ====
Try	Opposing team	Location	Venue	Competition	Date	Result	Score
1	Romania	London, England	Twickenham Stadium	2001 Autumn Internationals	17 November 2001	Win	134 – 0
2	Romania	London, England	Twickenham Stadium	2001 Autumn Internationals	17 November 2001	Win	134 – 0
3	Romania	London, England	Twickenham Stadium	2001 Autumn Internationals	17 November 2001	Win	134 – 0
4	Romania	London, England	Twickenham Stadium	2001 Autumn Internationals	17 November 2001	Win	134 – 0
5	Scotland	Edinburgh, Scotland	Murrayfield Stadium	2002 Six Nations Championship	2 February 2002	Win	3 – 29
6	Scotland	Edinburgh, Scotland	Murrayfield Stadium	2002 Six Nations Championship	2 February 2002	Win	3 – 29
7	France	Saint-Denis, France	Stade de France	2002 Six Nations Championship	2 March 2002	Loss	20 – 15
8	Italy	Rome, Italy	Stadio Flaminio	2002 Six Nations Championship	7 April 2002	Win	9 – 45
9	France	London, England	Twickenham Stadium	2003 Six Nations Championship	15 February 2003	Win	25 – 17
10	Scotland	London, England	Twickenham Stadium	2003 Six Nations Championship	22 March 2003	Win	40 – 9
11	Scotland	London, England	Twickenham Stadium	2003 Six Nations Championship	22 March 2003	Win	40 – 9
12	France	London, England	Twickenham Stadium	2003 Rugby World Cup warm-up matches	6 September 2003	Win	45 – 14
13	Georgia	Perth, Australia	Subiaco Oval	2003 Rugby World Cup	12 October 2003	Win	84 – 6
14	Uruguay	Brisbane, Australia	Suncorp Stadium	2003 Rugby World Cup	2 November 2003	Win	111 – 13
15	Uruguay	Brisbane, Australia	Suncorp Stadium	2003 Rugby World Cup	2 November 2003	Win	111 – 13
16	Australia	Sydney, Australia	Stadium Australia	2003 Rugby World Cup Final	22 November 2003	Win	17 – 20
17	Italy	Rome, Italy	Stadio Flaminio	2004 Six Nations Championship	15 February 2004	Win	9 – 50
18	Italy	Rome, Italy	Stadio Flaminio	2004 Six Nations Championship	15 February 2004	Win	9 – 50
19	Italy	Rome, Italy	Stadio Flaminio	2004 Six Nations Championship	15 February 2004	Win	9 – 50
20	Canada	London, England	Twickenham Stadium	2004 end-of-year rugby union internationals	13 November 2004	Win	70 – 0
21	Canada	London, England	Twickenham Stadium	2004 end-of-year rugby union internationals	13 November 2004	Win	70 – 0
22	Canada	London, England	Twickenham Stadium	2004 end-of-year rugby union internationals	13 November 2004	Win	70 – 0
23	Scotland	London, England	Twickenham Stadium	2007 Six Nations Championship	3 February 2007	Win	42 – 20
24	Scotland	London, England	Twickenham Stadium	2007 Six Nations Championship	3 February 2007	Win	42 – 20
25	Italy	London, England	Twickenham Stadium	2007 Six Nations Championship	10 February 2007	Win	20 – 7
26	Wales	Cardiff, Wales	Millennium Stadium	2007 Six Nations Championship	17 March 2007	Loss	27 – 18
27	Wales	London, England	Twickenham Stadium	2007 Rugby World Cup warm-up matches	4 August 2007	Win	62 – 5
28	United States	Lens, France	Stade Félix Bollaert	2007 Rugby World Cup	8 September 2007	Win	28 – 10

==== British & Irish Lions ====
Try	Opposing team	Location	Venue	Competition	Date	Result	Score
1	Australia	Brisbane, Australia	The Gabba	2001 British & Irish Lions tour to Australia	30 June 2001	Win	13 – 29
2	Australia	Sydney, Australia	Stadium Australia	2001 British & Irish Lions tour to Australia	14 July 2001	Loss	29 – 23

== Coaching career ==
On 5 March 2008, the RFL announced that Robinson would be returning to rugby league in a coaching capacity at grass roots level from under 8s to open age, as a dual code ambassador for the sport in association with Gillette.

On 25 February 2009 it was announced that Robinson would be re-joining Sale Sharks as the new head coach from the 2009–10 season.

== Awards ==
Already a Member of the Order of the British Empire (MBE), he was appointed Officer of the Order of the British Empire (OBE) in the 2008 New Year Honours.

In March 2017, Robinson was awarded the Lifetime Achievement Award at the Lycamobile British Ethnic Diversity Sports Awards (BEDSAs) held at the London Hilton on Park Lane.

Rugby Union Honours:

Rugby World Cup: Winner (2003);

Six Nations Championship: Winner (2003 Grand Slam)

Premiership Rugby: Winner (2005/06 with Sale Sharks)

European Challenge Cup: Winner (2002, 2005 with Sale Sharks)

Rugby League Honours

World Club Challenge: Winner (1994 with Wigan)

Super League / Championship: Winner (1993–94, 1994–95, 1995–96, 1998)

Challenge Cup: Winner (1994, 1995 with Wigan)

Regal Trophy / John Player Trophy: Winner (1992–93, 1995–96 with Wigan)

== Personal life ==
He is of Scottish and Jamaican descent. His father William Thorpe, a Jamaican living in Leeds, left his mother before Robinson's birth. Robinson and his two older brothers Bernard and George were raised by his mother and a step father. In 2003, he was reunited with his natural father again through his brother and sister. Robinson is nicknamed 'Billy Whizz' after a character in the British comic The Beano, who is an extremely fast runner.

In 2012, his eldest son Lewis Tierney, who plays as a full back, signed a two-year deal with Wigan Warriors at age 18. Tierney has declared himself for Scotland. Robinson has five other children including Patrick, a professional cyclist.

After the 2003 Rugby World Cup, Robinson wrote an autobiography entitled Finding My Feet: My Autobiography published by Coronet Books. In it, he wrote about how he overcame issues from his childhood and bouts of drinking when he found success as a rugby league star. In 2005, a biography, The Real Jason Robinson, written with Robinson's full co-operation by Dave Swanton, was published by Empire Publications.

== See also ==
- List of top English points scorers and try scorers

Sporting positions
Preceded by Lawrence Dallaglio	English National Rugby Union Captain; Nov 2004 – Feb 2005	Succeeded by Martin Corry
Preceded by Mike Catt	English National Rugby Union Captain; May 2007	Succeeded by Jonny Wilkinson
