= Danny Ellison =

English rugby league footballer

Personal information
- Full name: Daniel Andrew Ellison
- Born: 16 December 1972 (age 52); Leigh, Lancashire, England

Playing information
- Position: Wing
Club
Years	Team	Pld	T	G	FG	P
1993–97	Wigan	34	22	0	0	88
1994–95	Workington
1998–99	Castleford	25	7	0	0	28
2000	Halifax	1	0	0	0	0
	Total	60	29	0	0	116

Danny Ellison (born 16 December 1972) is an English former professional rugby league footballer who played as a wing for Wigan, Workington, Castleford and Halifax.

== Playing career ==
Ellison made his début for Wigan in August 1993 against Hull F.C. After spending a season with Workington, he returned to the first team in 1996, and went on to score a hat trick in Wigan's Premiership final victory against St Helens. In January 1998, he was sold to Castleford Tigers.
