= Andy Johnson (rugby league) =

English rugby league footballer

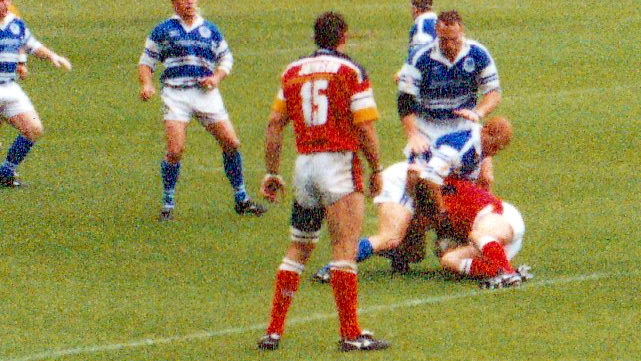

Personal information
- Full name: Andrew Johnson
- Born: 14 June 1974 (age 51) Wigan, Greater Manchester, England

Playing information
- Height: 6 ft 1 in (1.85 m)
- Weight: 14 st 13 lb (95 kg)
- Position: Wing, Centre, Stand-off, Second-row, Loose forward
Club
Years	Team	Pld	T	G	FG	P
1994–99	Wigan Warriors	81	27	0	0	108
1999(loan)	→ Huddersfield Giants	5	1	0	0	4
2000–01	London Broncos	47	13	0	0	52
2002–03	Castleford Tigers	52	11	0	0	44
2004–05	Salford City Reds	35	7	0	0	28
	Total	220	59	0	0	236

Andy Johnson (born 14 June 1974) is an English former professional rugby league footballer who played in the 1990s and 2000s. He played at club level for the Wigan Warriors, Huddersfield Giants, London Broncos, Castleford Tigers and the Salford City Reds. A versatile utility player, Johnson played in a number of positions throughout his career, usually as a centre or a back row forward.

== Background ==
Andy Johnson was born in Wigan, Greater Manchester, England, and as of 2013 he lives with his wife Alex and two sons Jack and James and is raising money to fight Duchenne muscular dystrophy.

== Playing career ==
Andy Johnson joined Wigan aged 17, he won 100 first games by playing in both the backs and the forwards. In 1997 he participated in two Premiership Finals at Old Trafford, Manchester. The same year he played for Wigan Warriors in the World Club Challenge against the Canterbury Bulldogs which ended up with him being the 9th highest scorer. In December 1997, Johnson ruptured an achilles tendon in training, keeping him out for the entirety of 1998's Super League III. In August 1999, Johnson was loaned out to the Huddersfield Giants for the rest of the season.

At the end of the 1999's Super League IV, Johnson and Wigan Warriors' teammate Jon Clarke both signed a two-year deal with London Broncos, re-uniting with former Wigan coach John Monie. He signed a contract with Castleford Tigers in August 2001. He quit playing after suffering an injury which he got 14-months after he signed a two-year contract with the Salford City Reds.
