= Gaël Tallec =

Former France international rugby league & union footballer

Personal information
- Born: 15 August 1976 (age 50) France
- Height: 186 cm (6 ft 1 in)
- Weight: 97 kg (15 st 4 lb)

Playing information

Rugby league
- Position: Prop, Second-row
Club
| Years | Team | Pld | T | G | FG | P |
|---|---|---|---|---|---|---|
| ≤1995–95 | Lézignan Sangliers |
| 1995–97 | Wigan Warriors | 30 | 4 | 0 | 0 | 16 |
| 1998–99 | Castleford Tigers | 46 | 4 | 0 | 0 | 16 |
| 2000 | Halifax | 24 | 3 | 0 | 0 | 12 |
| | Total | 100 | 11 | 0 | 0 | 44 |
Representative
| Years | Team | Pld | T | G | FG | P |
| 1995–2001 | France | 13 | 4 | 0 | 0 | 16 |

Rugby union
Club
| Years | Team | Pld | T | G | FG | P |
|---|---|---|---|---|---|---|
| 2001 | RC Toulonnais |
- Source: RLP As of 2 February 2021

Gaël Tallec (born 15 August 1976) is a French former professional rugby league and rugby union footballer who played in the 1990s and 2000s. He played representative rugby league for France at the 1995 World Cup and 2000 World Cup.

== Playing career ==
Tallec was transferred from the Lézignan Sangliers to the Wigan Warriors in 1995 and played for them for three seasons, appearing in thirty matches. He played in Wigan Warriors' 44-14 victory over St. Helens in the Premiership Final during Super League I at Old Trafford, Manchester on Sunday 8 September 1996.

The Castleford Tigers signed him from Wigan Warriors on 26 January 1998, where he played for them forty-six times over two years. He finished his Super League career with Halifax in 2000, where he played in twenty-four matches.

Tallec switched codes and joined RC Toulonnais in late 2001.

== International career ==
Tallec first played for France in 1995 at the World Cup. He then competed at the 1996 European Championship for France, scoring a try in their June defeat by Wales.

He was one of several players to remain in the French squad for the 2000 World Cup and he played in four matches during the tournament.

Tallec toured New Zealand and Papua New Guinea in June–July 2001 before he switched codes.
