= Neil Cowie =

Former Great Britain & Wales international rugby league footballer

Personal information
- Full name: Neil Fraser Cowie
- Born: 16 January 1967 (age 59) Todmorden, West Riding of Yorkshire, England

Playing information
- Position: Prop
Club
Years	Team	Pld	T	G	FG	P
1986–91	Rochdale Hornets	133	23	0	0	92
1991–01	Wigan Warriors	330	34	0	1	137
	Total	463	57	0	1	229
Representative
Years	Team	Pld	T	G	FG	P
1995–99	Wales	7	1	0	0	4
1993–98	Great Britain	3	0	0	0	0

Neil Fraser Cowie (born 16 January 1967) is a former professional rugby league footballer who played in the 1990s and 2000s. He played at representative level for Great Britain and Wales, and at club level for Rochdale Hornets and Wigan Warriors, as a prop.

== Background ==
Neil Cowie was born in Todmorden, West Riding of Yorkshire, England on 16 January 1967.

== Playing career ==
=== Club career ===
Cowie signed for Rochdale Hornets in 1986 and went on to make 16 appearances in his first season. Over the next four seasons he became a regular in the Rochdale Hornets front row, occasionally playing as a second-row. His blockbusting performances caught the attention of Wigan and he signed for them at the end of the 1990–91 season. The transfer fee was set by a tribunal, with Wigan paying an initial £65,000 to Rochdale, plus an additional £15,000 when Cowie made his international debut.

During the 1991–92 season, Cowie played for defending champions Wigan as a substitute in their 1991 World Club Challenge victory against the visiting Penrith Panthers.

During the 1992–93 season, Cowie was a substitute (replacing Steve Hampson) in Wigan's 5–4 victory over St Helens in the 1992 Lancashire Cup Final at Knowsley Road, St Helens on 18 October 1992. He also played in Wigan's 15–8 victory over Bradford Northern in the 1992–93 Regal Trophy Final at Elland Road, Leeds on 23 January 1993,

During the 1993–94 season, Cowie played in the 2–33 defeat by Castleford in the 1993–94 Regal Trophy Final at Elland Road, Leeds on 22 January 1994. Cowie travelled with defending champions Wigan to Brisbane, playing as a prop in their 1994 World Club Challenge victory over Australian premiers, the Brisbane Broncos.

During the 1994–95 season, Cowie played in the 40–10 victory over Warrington in the 1994–95 Regal Trophy Final at Alfred McAlpine Stadium, Huddersfield on 28 January 1995.

During the 1995–96 season, Cowie played in the 25–16 victory over St Helens in the 1995–96 Regal Trophy Final at Alfred McAlpine Stadium, Huddersfield on 13 January 1996.

Cowie played for Wigan Warriors from the bench in their 1998 Super League Grand Final victory over Leeds Rhinos.

In June 2000, Cowie converted a drop goal, the only one-pointer he scored in his career, in a 30–18 victory over the Bradford Bulls. He played for Wigan at prop forward in their 2000 Super League Grand Final loss against St Helens.

Cowie played for Wigan Warriors from the bench in their 2001 Super League Grand Final defeat by the Bradford Bulls. This turned out to be his last appearance for the club, as he announced his retirement shortly after the match.

=== Representative career ===
Cowie was selected to go on the 1992 Great Britain Lions tour of Australia and New Zealand.

Cowie won caps for Wales while at Wigan in 1995 against England, and France, and in the 1995 Rugby League World Cup against Western Samoa, in 1996 against England, in 1998 against England, and in 1999 against Ireland, and Scotland, and won caps for Great Britain while at Wigan in 1993 against France, and in 1998 against New Zealand (2 matches). Cowie was also selected for the 2000 Rugby League World Cup, but withdrew from the squad due to injury.
