= 2020 Hull FC season =

- Super League Rank: 6th
- Challenge Cup: Quarter-final; (lost to Wigan Warriors 4–36)
- 2020 record: Wins: 10; draws: 0; losses: 9
- Points scored: For: 405; against: 436

Team information
- CEO: Andy Last
- Captain: Danny Houghton
- Stadium: KCOM Stadium
- Avg. attendance: 10,843
- Agg. attendance: 54,215
- High attendance: 19,599
- Low attendance: 0

Top scorers
- Tries: Jamie Shaul &: Ratu Naulago; (7 Each)
- Goals: Marc Sneyd (55 +5 DG)
- Points: Sneyd (123)
← 2019	List of seasons	2021 →

This article details the Hull FC's rugby league football club's 2020 season.

== Fixtures and results ==
=== Super League ===
==== Table ====
Pos	Team	Pld	W	D	L	PF	PA	PP	Pts	PCT	Qualification (Note: Where teams have the same win percentage, position is decided by points scored percentage (points scored divided by points conceded).)
1	Wigan Warriors (L)	17	13	0	4	408	278	146.8	26	76.47	Semi-finals
2	St Helens (C)	17	12	0	5	469	195	240.5	24	70.59	Semi-finals
3	Warrington Wolves (Note: Salford forfeited a game against Warrington. Under RFL operational rules, the game is recorded as a 24–0 victory for Warrington and converse loss for Salford with the points scored/conceded applying to both teams.)	17	12	0	5	365	204	178.9	24	70.59	Elimination semi-finals
4	Catalans Dragons	13	8	0	5	376	259	145.2	16	61.54	Elimination semi-finals
5	Leeds Rhinos	17	10	0	7	369	390	94.6	20	58.82	Elimination semi-finals
6	Hull F.C.	17	9	0	8	405	436	92.9	18	52.94	Elimination semi-finals
7	Huddersfield Giants (Note: Huddersfield were placed on standby to take the place of any of the four teams in the elimination finals should one be unable to fulfil their fixture.)	18	7	0	11	318	367	86.6	14	38.89	
8	Castleford Tigers	16	6	0	10	328	379	86.5	12	37.50	
9	Salford Red Devils	18	8	0	10	354	469	75.5	10 (Note: Salford deducted 3 wins by the Rugby Football League for failing to meet the terms of a financial commitment agreed in 2013.)	27.78	
10	Wakefield Trinity	19	5	0	14	324	503	64.4	10	26.32	
11	Hull Kingston Rovers	17	3	0	14	290	526	55.1	6	17.65	

Source: BBC Sport
Rules for classification: 1) Points; 2) Points difference; 3) Number of points scored;
(C) Champions; (L) League Leaders' Shield Winners

==== Super League results ====
W Win D Draw L Loss – Postponed/Cancelled

Date and time	Rnd	Versus	H/A	Venue	Result	Score	Tries	Goals	Attendance	TV	Report
2 February, 16:45	1	Leeds Rhinos	A	Headingley	W	30–4	Tuimavave, Naulago (2), Bowden, Shaul	Sneyd (5)	19,500	Sky Sports	
7 February, 19:45	2	Hull KR	H	KCOM Stadium	W	25–16	Connor, Houghton, Sneyd, Griffin	Sneyd (4) +1 DG	19,599	Sky Sports	
16 February, 15:00	3	St. Helens	H	KCOM Stadium	L	18–32	Tuimavave (2), Shaul	Sneyd (3)	12,399	—N/a	
23 February, 15:00	4	Wigan Warriors	A	DW Stadium	L	12–26	Swift, Griffin	Sneyd (2)	12,005	—N/a	
1 March, 15:00	5	Catalans Dragons	H	KCOM Stadium	L	29–34	Fonua (2), Tuimavave, Shaul, Ma'u	Sneyd (4) +1DG	12,003	—N/a	
6 March, 19:45	6	Wakefield Trinity	A	The Mobile Rocket Stadium	W	27–26 (g.p.)	Fonua, Buchanan, Kelly	Sneyd (5) +1DG	5,528		
12 March, 19:45	7	Warrington Wolves	H	KCOM Stadium	L	4–38	Buchanan	—N/a	10,214	Sky Sports	
9 August, 13:00	8	Salford Red Devils	A	Emerald Headingley (Note: all games resumed behind closed doors, at neutral venues due to the COVID-19 pandemic in the United Kingdom)	L	18–54	Kelly, Ma'u, Shaul	Sneyd (3)	0 (Note: Match Played behind closed doors, due to the COVID-19 pandemic in the United Kingdom)	Sky Sports	
30 August, 16:15	10	Huddersfield Giants	A	Halliwell Jones Stadium	W	31–12	Kelly, Sneyd, Griffin, Brown, Fonua	Sneyd (5) +1DG	0	Sky Sports	
4 September, 20:15	11	Warrington Wolves	A	Emerald Headingley	L	12–37	Griffin, Tuimavave	Sneyd (2)	0	Sky Sports	
10 September, 18:00	12	Wakefield Trinity	A	Totally Wicked Stadium	W	26–23	Lane (2), Swift (2), Savelio	Connor (3)	0	Sky Sports	
24 September, 18:00	13	Salford Red Devils	A	Halliwell Jones Stadium	L	22–28	Shaul (2), Savelio, Lane	Connor (3)	0	Sky Sports	
1 October, 19:45	14	Castleford Tigers	A	The Mend-A-Hose Jungle	W	32–28	Scott, Johnstone, Satae, McNamara, Connor	Sneyd (6)	0	Sky Sports	
8 October, 19:45	15	Leeds Rhinos (Note: Leeds were originally due to play Castleford, but Castleford were stood down on 7 October after three players tested positive for Covid-19 and six more ordered to isolate. This left Castleford with just 14 fit players to form a team, so now they will play Hull in Round 18 instead.)	A	Emerald Headingley	L	22–40	Fonua, Savelio, Brown, Griffin	Sneyd (3)	0	Sky Sports	
13 October, 17:30	16	Huddersfield Giants	A	Halliwell Jones Stadium	W	18–16	Naulago, Fonua, Faraimo	Sneyd (3)	0	Sky Sports	
18 October, 15:00 (Note: As a result of at least six Hull F.C. players testing positive for COVID-19, round 9 matches involving Hull F.C. and their opponents, Salford Red Devils, were postponed, and the fixture list was reversed for this round, with Castleford now set to play St Helens, whilst Wakefield will now play Catalans.)	9	Castleford Tigers	H	KCOM Stadium	W	48–6	Naulago (2), Savelio, Connor, Faraimo, Houghton, Tuimavave, Ma'u	Sneyd (7), Connor	0	Sky Sports	
22 October, 19:15	17	Catalans Dragons	A	Stade Gilbert Brutus	–	C–C (Note: Match postponed on 21 October after five Catalans players and two members of the coaching staff tested positive for Covid-19.) (Note: Match cancelled after Super League meeting on 3 November rescheduled the play-offs and ended the regular season early.)	—N/a	—N/a	—N/a	—N/a	
29 October, 19:45	19	Hull KR	A	Totally Wicked Stadium	W	31–16	Bowden Naulago (2), Faraimo (2), Sao,	Sneyd (3)	0	Sky Sports	
8 November	21	St Helens	A	—N/a	–	C–C	—N/a	—N/a	—N/a	—N/a	
12 November	22	Wigan Warriors	H	—N/a	–	C–C	—N/a	—N/a	—N/a	—N/a	

==== Play-offs ====
Date and time	Rnd	Versus	H/A	Venue	Result	Score	Tries	Goals	Attendance	TV	Report
12 November 2020, 19:00	Elim	Warrington Wolves	A	Halliwell Jones Stadium	W	27–14	Faraimo (2), Satae, Cator, Connor	Sneyd (5) +1DG	0	Sky Sports	
19 November 2020, 19:00	SF	Wigan Warriors	A	DW Stadium	L	2–29	—N/a	Sneyd	0	Sky Sports	

=== Challenge Cup ===
W Win L Loss

Date and time	Rnd	Versus	H/A	Venue	Result	Score	Tries	Goals	Attendance	TV	Report
13 September 2020, 15:00	6	Castleford Tigers	A	Totally Wicked Stadium	W	29–16	Tuimavave (2), Albert Kelly, Naulago	Connor (6) +1DG	0	BBC One	
19 September 2020, 17:00	QF	Wigan Warriors	A	AJ Bell Stadium	W	4–36	Fonua	—N/a	0	BBC Two	

== Players ==
=== Player statistics ===
#	Player	Position	Tries	Goals	DG	Points	Red Cards	Yellow Cards
1	Jamie Shaul	Fullback	4	0	0	16	0	0
2	Bureta Faraimo	Wing	0	0	0	0	0	0
3	Carlos Tuimavave	Centre	4	0	0	16	0	0
4	Josh Griffin	Centre	2	0	0	8	0	1
5	Adam Swift	Wing	1	0	0	4	0	0
6	Jake Connor	Stand-off	1	0	0	4	0	0
7	Marc Sneyd	Scrum-half	1	23	3	53	0	0
8	Scott Taylor	Prop	0	0	0	4	0	0
9	Danny Houghton	Hooker	1	0	0	4	0	0
10	Chris Satae	Prop	0	0	0	4	0	0
11	Josh Jones	Second-row	0	0	0	0	0	0
12	Manu Ma'u	Second-row	1	0	0	4	0	0
13	Ligi Sao	Second-row	0	0	0	0	0	0
14	Albert Kelly	Fullback	1	0	0	4	0	0
15	Joe Cator	Centre	0	0	0	0	0	0
16	Jordan Johnstone	Hooker	0	0	0	0	0	0
19	Masimbaashe Matongo	Prop	0	0	0	0	0	0
20	Brad Fash	Second-row	0	0	0	0	0	0
21	Jordan Lane	Second-row	0	0	0	0	0	0
22	Josh Bowden	Loose forward	1	0	0	4	0	0
23	Andre Savelio	Loose forward	0	0	0	0	0	0
24	Mahe Fonua	Centre	3	0	0	12	0	0
25	Connor Wynne	Fullback	0	0	0	0	0	0
27	Liam Harris	Scrum-half	0	0	0	0	0	0
28	Lewis Bienek	Prop	0	0	0	0	0	0
29	Gareth Ellis	Loose forward	0	0	0	0	0	0
30	Jack Brown	Prop	0	0	0	0	0	0
31	Cameron Scott	Centre	0	0	0	0	0	0
33	Ratu Naulago	Wing	2	0	0	8	0	0
33	Kieran Buchanan	Wing	1	0	0	4	0	0

- As of Round 6 (6 March 2020)

=== 2020 squad ===
2020 Hull F.C. Squad
First team squad			Coaching staff
1 (England) Jamie Shaul – FB; 2 (United States) Bureta Faraimo – WG; 3 (Samoa) Carlos Tuimavave – CE, SO; 4 (England) Josh Griffin – CE, WG; 5 (England) Adam Swift – WG; 6 (England) Jake Connor – SO, CE, FB; 7 (England) Marc Sneyd – SH, SO, FB; 8 (England) Scott Taylor – PR (vc); 9 (England) Danny Houghton (c) – HK; 10 (Tonga) Tavita Satae – PR, SR; 11 (England) Josh Jones – SR; 12 (New Zealand) Manu Ma'u – SR; 13 (England) Ligi Sao – SR	14 (Australia) Albert Kelly – FB, SH, SO; 15 (England) Joe Cator – CE, SR; 16 (England) Jordan Johnstone – HK; 18 The Old Faithful; 19 (Zimbabwe) Masimbaashe Matongo – PR; 20 (England) Brad Fash – SR, LF, PR; 21 (England) Jordan Lane – SR, LF; 22 (England) Josh Bowden – LF, PR; 23 (Tonga) Andre Savelio – LF, SR; 24 (Australia) Mahe Fonua – CE, WG; 25 (England) Connor Wynne – FB; 26 (England) Kieran Buchanan – CE; 27 (England) Liam Harris – SH, SO	28 (Ireland) Lewis Bienek – PR; 29 (England) Gareth Ellis – LF, PR; 29 (France) Levy Nzoungou – PR; 30 (England) Jack Brown – PR; 31 (England) Cameron Scott – CE; 33 (Fiji) Ratu Naulago – WG	Head coach: TBC; Assistant coaches: Andy Last; Richard Horne; Gareth Ellis; Richard Tate; Legend: (c) Captain(s); (vc) Vice-captain(s); Updated: 28 January 2020; Source(s): 2020 Squad Numbers

=== 2020 transfers ===
Gains

Player	Club	Contract	Date
(England) Josh Jones	Salford Red Devils	2 years	May 2019
(England) Adam Swift	St. Helens	2 years	May 2019
(Tonga) Mahe Fonua	Wests Tigers	3 years	June 2019
(New Zealand) Manu Ma'u	Parramatta Eels	2 years	July 2019
(England) Jordan Johnstone	Widnes Vikings	3 years	August 2019
(Samoa) Ligi Sao	New Zealand Warriors	2 Years	August 2019
(New Zealand) Tevita Satae	New Zealand Warriors	2 Years	August 2019

Losses

Player	Club	Contract	Date
(England) Cameron Scott	Leigh Centurions	Season Long Loan	January 2020
(England) Lewis Bienek	Leigh Centurions	Season Long Loan	January 2020
