= 2021 Hull FC season =

English rugby league season

2021 Hull F.C. Season
- Super League XXVI Rank: 8th
- Play-off result: DNQ
- Challenge Cup: SF
- 2021 record: Wins: 10; draws: 1; losses: 13
- Points scored: For: 409; against: 476

Team information
- Chairman: Adam Pearson
- Head Coach: Brett Hodgson
- Captains: Danny Houghton; Scott Taylor; Marc Sneyd
- Stadium: KCOM Stadium; Hull, East Riding of Yorkshire
← 2020	List of seasons	2022 →

Hull F.C. rugby league football club in the 2021 season played in Super League XXVI and the 2021 Challenge Cup.

== Results ==
=== Super League ===
==== Table ====
Pos	Team	Pld	W	D	L	PF	PA	PP	Pts	PCT	Qualification (Note: Teams must have played at least 70% of scheduled fixtures to qualify for the play-offs.)
1	Catalans Dragons (L)	23	19	0	4	688	398	172.9	38	82.61	Semi-final
2	St. Helens (C)	21	16	0	5	548	229	239.3	32	76.19	Semi-final
3	Warrington Wolves	21	15	1	5	588	354	166.1	31	73.81	Elimination Semi-finals
4	Wigan Warriors	25	15	0	10	387	385	100.5	30	60.00	Elimination Semi-finals
5	Leeds Rhinos	24	13	0	11	556	440	126.4	26	54.17	Elimination Semi-finals
6	Hull Kingston Rovers	20	10	0	10	497	458	108.5	20	50.00	Elimination Semi-finals
7	Castleford Tigers	23	11	0	12	437	552	79.2	22	47.83	
8	Hull FC	21	8	1	12	409	476	85.9	17	40.48	
9	Huddersfield Giants	24	9	0	15	460	516	89.1	18	37.50	
10	Wakefield Trinity	24	9	0	15	482	548	88.0	18	37.50	
11	Salford Red Devils	22	7	0	15	402	584	68.8	14	31.82	
12	Leigh Centurions (R)	22	2	0	20	356	870	40.9	4	9.09	Relegated to the Championship

Rules for classification: 1) win percentage; 2) points scored percentage (points scored divided by points conceded).
(C) Champions; (L) League Leaders' Shield Winners; (R) Relegated

==== Super League results ====
W Win D Draw L Loss

Super League results
Date	Round	Versus	H/A	Venue	Result	Score	Tries	Goals	Attendance	Report
28 March	1	Huddersfield Giants	N	Headingley	W	22–10	Connor, Griffin, Reynolds	Sneyd (5)	—N/a (Note: Played behind closed doors due to the COVID-19 pandemic) (Note: Broadcast on Sky Sports)	RLP
3 April	2	Salford Red Devils	N	Totally Wicked Stadium	W	35–4	Reynolds (2), Griffin, Savelio, Scott	Sneyd (5), Connor (2 + FG)	—N/a	RLP
18 April	3	Warrington Wolves	H	KCOM Stadium	D	14–14	Connor, Tuimavave	Sneyd (3)	—N/a	RLP
23 April	4	Wakefield Trinity	H	KCOM Stadium	W	20–14	Savelio, Swift, Tuimavave	Sneyd (4)	—N/a	RLP
29 April	5	Wigan Warriors	A	DW Stadium	L	14–16	Fonua, Swift	Sneyd (3)	—N/a	RLP
17 May	6	Catalans Dragons	H	KCOM Stadium	L	10–27	Fonua, Reynolds	Sneyd	5,527	RLP
23 May	7	Leeds Rhinos	A	Headingley	W	18–12			4,000	RLP
28 May	8	St Helens	A	Totally Wicked Stadium	L	16–34	Fonua (2), Swift	Sneyd (2)	4,000	RLP
10 June	9	Castleford Tigers	A	Mend-A-Hose Jungle	W	30–12	Fonua (2), Swift (2), Connor	Sneyd (4), Connor	4,000	RLP
19 June	10	Leigh Centurions	A	Leigh Sports Village	W	64–22	Savelio (2), Swift (2), Brown, Connor, Faraimo, Fonua, Ma'u, Satae, Wynne	Sneyd (8)	2,338	RLP
25 June	11	Huddersfield Giants	H	MKM Stadium	W	17–10	Fonua, Logan, Wynne	Sneyd (2 + FG)	5,527	RLP
22 July	15	Huddersfield Giants	A	John Smiths Stadium	L	26–40	Vulikijapani (2), Lane, Satae, Tuimavave	Sneyd (3)	3,699	RLP
29 July	16	Leeds Rhinos	H	MKM Stadium	L	12–22	Swift, Tuimavave	Sneyd (2)		RLP
2 August	17	St Helens	H	MKM Stadium	L	10–42	Faraimo, Swift	Sneyd	7,038	RLP
13 August	19	Catalans Dragons	A	Stade Gilbert Brutus	L	16–31	Faraimo, Tuimavave	McNamara (4)		RLP
21 August	20	Hull Kingston Rovers	H	MKM Stadium	W	23–22	Faraimo (2), Swift, Tuimavave	Sneyd (3 + FG)	15,000	RLP
26 August	21	Castleford Tigers	H	MKM Stadium	L	12–23	Connor, Swift	Sneyd (2)		RLP
30 August	22	Salford Red Devils	A	AJ Bell Stadium	L	14–42	Houghton, Sao	Sneyd (3)		RLP
5 September	23	Leeds Rhinos	N	St James' Park	L	24–25	Connor, Houghton, Tuimavave	Sneyd (6)	35,104	RLP
11 September	24	Wigan Warriors	H	MKM Stadium	L	0–10			10,003	RLP
17 September	25	Wakefield Trinity	A	Mobile Rocket Stadium	L	12–44	Lane, Vulikijapani	Connor (2)		RLP

=== Challenge Cup ===
W Win L Loss

Challenge Cup results
Date	Round	Versus	H/A	Venue	Result	Score	Tries	Goals	Attendance	Report
11 April	3	Featherstone Rovers	A	Millennium Stadium	W	34–14	Griffin (2), Tuimavave (2), Faraimo, Johnstone	Connor (5)	—N/a (Note: Broadcast on Our League)	RLP
7 May	Quarter-finals	Wigan Warriors	N	Headingley	W	20–10	Satae (2), Swift	Sneyd	—N/a (Note: Broadcast on BBC)	RLP
5 June	Semi-finals	St Helens	N	Leigh Sports Village	L	18–33	Fonua, Houghton, Scott	Sneyd (3)	4,000	RLP

== Players ==
=== Squad ===
2021 Hull F.C. Squad
First team squad		Coaching staff
1 (England) Jake Connor – FB, SO, CE (gk); 2 (United States) Bureta Faraimo – WG; 3 (Samoa) Carlos Tuimavave – CE, SO; 4 (England) Josh Griffin – CE, SR (gk); 5 (Tonga) Mahe Fonua – WG, CE; 6 (Australia) Josh Reynolds – SO; 7 (England) Marc Sneyd – SH (gk); 8 (England) Scott Taylor (vc) – PR; 9 (England) Danny Houghton (c) – HK; 10 (Tonga) Chris Satae – PR; 11 (England) Andre Savelio – SR, LF; 12 (Tonga) Manu Ma'u – SR; 13 (Samoa) Ligi Sao – PR, LF	14 (England) Jordan Johnstone – HK; 15 (England) Joe Cator – LF, SR; 16 (England) Jordan Lane – SR, CE; 17 (England) Brad Fash – PR, LF; 19 (England) Ben McNamara – SH, FB; 20 (England) Jack Brown – PR; 21 (England) Adam Swift – WG; 22 (England) Josh Bowden – PR, LF; 23 (England) Connor Wynne – FB; 24 (England) Cameron Scott – CE; 25 (Zimbabwe) Masimbaashe Matongo – PR; 26 (England) Jude Ferreira – CE; 29 (England) Jamie Shaul – FB	Head coach: Brett Hodgson; Assistant coaches: Richard Horne; Gareth Ellis; Richard Tate; Legend: (c) Captain(s); (vc) Vice-captain(s); Updated: 14 February 2021; Source(s): 2021 Squad Numbers

=== Transfers ===
==== Gains ====
List of players joining Hull F.C.
Player	Club	Contract	Date
(England) Jude Ferreira	England Academy	3 Years	November 2020
(Australia) Josh Reynolds	Wests Tigers	2 Years	December 2020

==== Losses ====
List of players departing Hull F.C.
Player	Club	Contract	Date
(Scotland) Kieran Buchanan	Batley Bulldogs	1 Year	September 2020
(Fiji) Ratu Naulago	Bristol Bears	3 Years	September 2020
(Australia) Albert Kelly	Brisbane Broncos	2 Years	October 2020
(Ireland) Lewis Bienek	Castleford Tigers	1 Year	November 2020
(England) Gareth Ellis	Retired		November 2020
(England) Liam Harris	Halifax Panthers	1 Year	November 2020
