= 2022 Hull FC season =

English rugby league season

2022 Hull F.C. season
- Super League XXVII Rank: 9th
- Challenge Cup: Quarter-finals

Team information
- Chairman: Adam Pearson
- Head Coach: Brett Hodgson
- Captain: Danny Houghton
- Stadium: KCOM Stadium; Hull, East Riding of Yorkshire
← 2021	List of seasons	2023 →

In the 2022 rugby league season, Hull F.C. competed in Super League XXVII and the 2022 Challenge Cup. They were coached by Brett Hodgson.

== Season review ==
On 13 February, Hull began their Super League campaign with a 16–12 away win at Wakefield Trinity before suffering a 38–6 loss to St Helens. An inconsistent first half of the season ensued with a win over Salford Red Devils and loss at Castleford Tigers followed by a run of three wins which included a Challenge Cup victory over Sheffield Eagles. A run of three losses followed, beginning with a golden point 19–18 loss to Wigan Warriors in the league, a quarter-final cup defeat to Huddersfield Giants and a visit to local rivals Hull Kingston Rovers, but this was countered by three more wins in late April. Hull had a poor second half of the season, failing to win during June and with only two wins in July; a 34–28 win against Hull KR at the Magic Weekend, and 30–6 win over Toulouse Olympique. In August, Hull had a run of four defeats before again facing Toulouse to record a 28–12 win and then ended their season with a 36–4 loss to Hull KR.

== Results ==
=== Pre-season friendlies ===
W Win L Loss

Pre-season results
Date	Versus	H/A	Venue	Result	Score	Tries	Goals	Attendance	Report
16 January	Bradford Bulls	A	Odsal Stadium	L	18–42				(Note: Danny Brough Testimonial)
30 January	Leeds Rhinos	A	Headingley	L	6–38				(Note: Tom Briscoe Testimonial)

=== Super League ===
==== Table ====
Pos	Team	Pld	W	D	L	PF	PA	PD	Pts	Qualification
1	St Helens (C, L)	27	21	0	6	674	374	+300	42	Advance to semi-finals
2	Wigan Warriors	27	19	0	8	818	483	+335	38	Advance to semi-finals
3	Huddersfield Giants	27	17	1	9	613	497	+116	35	Advance to elimination finals
4	Catalans Dragons	27	16	0	11	539	513	+26	32	Advance to elimination finals
5	Leeds Rhinos	27	14	1	12	577	528	+49	29	Advance to elimination finals
6	Salford Red Devils	27	14	0	13	700	602	+98	28	Advance to elimination finals
7	Castleford Tigers	27	13	0	14	544	620	−76	26	
8	Hull Kingston Rovers	27	12	0	15	498	608	−110	24	
9	Hull FC	27	11	0	16	508	675	−167	22	
10	Wakefield Trinity	27	10	0	17	497	648	−151	20	
11	Warrington Wolves	27	9	0	18	568	664	−96	18	
12	Toulouse Olympique (R)	27	5	0	22	421	745	−324	10	Relegated to the Championship

(C) Champions; (L) League Leaders' Shield winners; (R) Relegated

==== Super League results ====
W Win D Draw L Loss

Super League results
Date	Round	Versus	H/A	Venue	Result	Score	Tries	Goals	Attendance	Report
13 February	1	Wakefield Trinity	A	Be Well Support Stadium	W	16–12	Gale, Lovodua, McIntosh	Gale (2)	6,148	RLP
19 February	2	St Helens	H	MKM Stadium	L	6–38	Griffin	McIntosh	12,673	RLP
26 February	3	Salford Red Devils	H	MKM Stadium	W	48–16	Lane (2), Scott (2), Connor, Luvodua, McIntosh, Reynolds, Satae	McIntosh (4), Conner (2)	10,081	RLP
6 March	4	Castleford Tigers	A	Mend-A-Hose Jungle	L	26–33	Griffin, Houghton, Shaul, Swift, Wynne	McNamara (3)	10,072	RLP
10 March	5	Leeds Rhinos	A	Headingley	W	31–8	Conner (2), Lovodua, Savelio, Swift	McNamara (5), Connor (FG)	11,552	RLP
20 March	6	Huddersfield Giants	H	MKM Stadium	W	14–6	Savelio, Vulikijapani	McNamara (3)	10,682	RLP
31 March	7	Wigan Warriors	A	DW Stadium	L	18–19	Houghton, Satae, Swift	Gale (3)	9,581	RLP
15 April	8	Hull Kingston Rovers	A	Sewell Group Craven Park	L	4–16	Reynolds	Gale	10,300	RLP
18 April	9	Warrington Wolves	H	MKM Stadium	W	18–16	Fash, Ma'u, Shaul	Gale (3)	9,726	RLP
24 April	10	Catalans Dragons	H	MKM Stadium	W	14–8	Lane, Satae	Connor (3)	9,101	RLP
30 April	11	Toulouse Olympique	H	MKM Stadium	W	48–12	McIntosh (3), Wynne (3), Balmforth, Evans, Lovodua	Connor (6)	11,308	RLP
13 May	12	St Helens	A	Totally Wicked Stadium	L	10–24	McIntosh (2)	Connor	11,268	RLP
21 May	13	Wigan Warriors	H	MKM Stadium	W	31–22	Swift (2), McIntosh, Reynolds, Satae, Tuimavave	Gale (3 + FG)	11,396	RLP
5 June	14	Wakefield Trinity	A	Be Well Support Stadium	L	18–19	Swift (2), McIntosh	Gale (3)	4,426	RLP
11 June	15	Catalans Dragons	A	Stade Gilbert Brutus	L	8–36	Griffin, McIntosh		8,847	RLP
24 June	16	Warrington Wolves	A	Halliwell Jones Stadium	L	0–4			8,591	RLP
2 July	17	Leeds Rhinos	H	MKM Stadium	L	16–62	Houghton, McIntosh, Satae	Griffin, McIntosh	10,360	RLP
10 July	18	Hull Kingston Rovers	N	St James' Park	W	34–28	Longstaff (2), Lovodua, Simm, Wynne	Gale (7)	25,333	RLP
15 July	19	Wigan Warriors	A	DW Stadium	L	0–60			11,314	RLP
22 July	20	Castleford Tigers	H	MKM Stadium	L	18–46	Houghton, McIntosh, Vulikijapani	Gale (3)	9,550	RLP
29 July	21	Toulouse Olympique	A	Stade Ernest Wallon	W	30–6	Barron, Brown, Longstaff, Simm, Smith	Gale (5)	4,238	RLP
5 August	22	Huddersfield Giants	A	John Smiths Stadium	L	16–22	Longstaff, J. Walker, Wynne	Gale (2)	4,642	RLP
14 August	23	St Helens	H	MKM Stadium	L	6–60	J. Walker	Gale	10,097	RLP
19 August	24	Wakefield Trinity	H	MKM Stadium	L	18–26	Longstaff, McNamara, Satae	Gale (3)	9,165	RLP
15 August	25	Salford Red Devils	A	AJ Bell Stadium	L	18–28	Connor, Fash, Smith	Gale (3)	3,968	RLP
28 August	26	Toulouse Olympique	H	MKM Stadium	W	38–12	Barron (2), Vulikijapani (2), Gardiner, Lane, Longstaff	Connor (5)	8,785	RLP
3 September	27	Hull KR	H	MKM Stadium	L	4–36	Gale		16,999	RLP

=== Challenge Cup ===
W Win L Loss

Challenge Cup results
Date	Round	Versus	H/A	Venue	Result	Score	Tries	Goals	Attendance	Report
26 March	6	Sheffield Eagles	N	Post Office Road	W	58–12	Wynne (3), Connor (2), Griffin, Lane, Savelio, Swift, Tuimavave, Vulikijapani	McNamara (7)	1,039	RLP
9 April	Quarter-final	Huddersfield Giants	A	John Smiths Stadium	L	16–24	Ma'u, McIntosh, Savelio	Gale (2)	3,637	RLP

== Players ==
=== Squad ===
2022 Hull F.C. squad
First team squad				Coaching staff
1 (England) Jake Connor – FB (gk); 2 (England) Adam Swift – WG; 3 (Samoa) Carlos Tuimavave – CE; 4 (England) Josh Griffin – CE, SR (gk); 5 (England) Darnell McIntosh – WG; 7 (England) Luke Gale (c) – SH (gk); 8 (Samoa) Ligi Sao – PR, LF, SR; 9 (England) Danny Houghton – HK; 10 (Tonga) Chris Satae – PR; 11 (England) Andre Savelio – SR; 12 (Tonga) Manu Ma'u – SR; 13 (England) Jordan Lane – SR, LF	14 (Fiji) Joe Lovodua – SO, SH, HK, LK; 15 (England) Joe Cator – LF, SR; 16 (Fiji) Kane Evans – PR; 17 (England) Brad Fash – LF, PR; 18 (England) The Hull FC Faithful; 19 (England) Ben McNamara – SH, SO; 20 (England) Jack Brown – LF, PR; 21 (England) Jordan Johnstone – LK, HK, FE; 22 (England) Josh Bowden – PR; 23 (England) Connor Wynne – CE, WG, FB; 24 (England) Cameron Scott – CE; 25 (Fiji) Mitieli Vulikijapani – CE, WG; 26 (England) Marcus Walker – SO, FB, CE	27 (England) Jacob Hookem – SO, SH, HK; 28 (England) Aidan Burrell – PR; 29 (England) Jamie Shaul – FB; 30 (England) Scott Taylor (vc) – PR; 31 (England) Charlie Severs – SR; 32 (England) Harvey Barron – WG; 33 (England) Denive Balmforth – HK; 34 (England) Davy Litten – CE; 35 (England) Matty Laidlaw – PR; 36 (England) Jack Walker – FB (loan); 37 (England) Josh Simm – WG (loan); 38 (England) Ellis Longstaff – SR (loan); 39 (England) Lewis Martin – WG	40 (Australia) Will Smith – FE, FB, HK; 39 (England) Kye Armstrong – LF; 39 (England) Will Gardiner – LF	Head coach: Brett Hodgson; Assistant coaches: Keiron Purtill; Gareth Ellis; Legend: (c) Captain(s); (vc) Vice-captain(s); Updated: 10 December 2022; Source(s): 2022 Squad Numbers

=== Transfers ===
==== Gains ====
List of players joining Hull F.C.
Player	Club	Contract	Date
(England) Darnell McIntosh	Huddersfield Giants	3 years	August 2021
(Fiji) Joe Lovodua	South Sydney Rabbitohs	1 year	October 2021
(Fiji) Kane Evans	New Zealand Warriors	2 years	October 2021
(England) Luke Gale	Leeds Rhinos	1 year	November 2021

==== Losses ====
List of players departing Hull F.C.
Player	Club	Contract	Date
(United States) Bureta Faraimo	Castleford Tigers	2 years	August 2021
(Tonga) Mahe Fonua	Castleford Tigers	2 years	October 2021
(Zimbabwe) Masi Matongo	York City Knights	1 year	October 2021
