= Ben McNamara =

English rugby league footballer

Personal information
- Full name: Ben McNamara
- Born: 8 December 2001 (age 24) Beverley, East Riding of Yorkshire, England
- Height: 5 ft 9 in (1.75 m)
- Weight: 13 st 1 lb (83 kg)

Playing information
- Position: Stand-off, Scrum-half, Hooker
Club
Years	Team	Pld	T	G	FG	P
2020–23	Hull FC	33	2	23	0	54
2024–26	Leigh Leopards	36	4	30	0	76
2026(loan)	→ Bradford Bulls	1	0	0	0	0
2026(loan)	→ Castleford Tigers	4	0	5	0	10
2027–	Castleford Tigers	0	0	0	0	0
	Total	74	6	58	0	140
- Source: As of 12 September 2026
- Father: Steve McNamara

Ben McNamara (born 8 December 2001) is an English professional rugby league footballer who plays as a stand-off, scrum-half or hooker for the Castleford Tigers in the Super League.

He has previously played for Hull FC and Leigh Leopards in the Super League. He has spent time on loan at Bradford Bulls in the Super League.

== Background ==
McNamara was born in Beverley, East Yorkshire, England. He is the son of rugby league coach and former professional player Steve McNamara, and the grandson of former player Ted McNamara.

McNamara began playing junior rugby league for Skirlaugh Bulls at five years old. After his father was appointed assistant coach at NRL club Sydney Roosters in 2014, McNamara moved to Australia and played for the Roosters at U13 to U15 level.

After relocating back to England, McNamara played rugby union at Pocklington School and later for Yorkshire Carnegie U17 academy as an inside centre or fly-half. He returned to rugby league with the City of Hull Academy, where he earned selection for the England Youth Squad to face France in two tests in Perpignan. He signed his first professional terms with Hull FC in 2019.

== Playing career ==
=== Hull F.C. ===
McNamara made his Super League debut for Hull in round 14 of the 2020 season against the Castleford Tigers. He was called up to the bench after teammates Jamie Shaul and Manu Ma'u dropped out and went on to score a try in the 61st minute.

McNamara played nine matches for Hull F.C. in the 2023 season as the club finished 10th on the table.

=== Leigh Leopards ===
On 16 October 2023, it was announced that he had signed for Leigh Leopards on a two-year deal.

In September 2025, McNamara signed a one-year contract extension with Leigh.

==== Bradford Bulls (loan) ====
On 29 April 2026, it was announced that he had signed for Bradford Bulls in the Super League on one-week loan.

==== Castleford Tigers (loan) ====
On 19 August 2026, McNamara joined Castleford Tigers on loan for the remainder of the season. He featured in the remaining four rounds and kicked five goals.

=== Castleford Tigers ===
On 9 September 2026, Castleford announced the signing of McNamara on a permanent basis following his loan spell. He joined on a two-year deal, with director of rugby Chris Chester saying "Ben offers us some real versatility being able to play at both the nine position and in the halves."

== Club statistics ==
Appearances and points in all competitions by year
Club	Season	Tier	App	T	G	DG	Pts
Hull FC	2020	Super League	4	1	0	0	4
Hull FC	2021	Super League	12	0	4	0	8
Hull FC	2022	Super League	8	1	18	0	40
Hull FC	2023	Super League	9	0	1	0	2
Hull FC	Total		33	2	23	0	54
Leigh Leopards	2024	Super League	9	2	0	0	8
Leigh Leopards	2025	Super League	18	2	30	0	68
Leigh Leopards	2026	Super League	9	0	0	0	0
Leigh Leopards	Total		36	4	30	0	76
→ Bradford Bulls (loan)	2026	Super League	1	0	0	0	0
Castleford Tigers	2026 (Note: On loan from Leigh in 2026 before joining permanently in 2027)	Super League	4	0	5	0	10
Castleford Tigers	2027	Super League	0	0	0	0	0
Castleford Tigers	Total		4	0	5	0	10
Career total			74	6	58	0	140

As of match played 12 September 2026
