= 2021 Super League season =

British rugby league season

Super League XXVI
- League: Super League
- Duration: 25 rounds
- Teams: 12
- Matches played: 139
- Points scored: 5,931
- Highest attendance: 16,319; Wigan Warriors St Helens (20 August)
- Lowest attendance: 1,000 (Note: Attendance for games in France were limited to 1,000 during the latter half of the season due to the COVID-19 pandemic. This figure does not include games played behind closed doors during the first half of the season.): Catalans Dragons 20–16 St Helens (22 May); Catalans Dragons 48–0 Wigan Warriors (29 May)
- Broadcast partners: Sky Sports; BBC Sport; Fox League; Fox Soccer Plus; Sport Klub

2021 season
- Champions: St Helens; 9th Super League title 16th British title
- League Leaders Shield: Catalans Dragons
- Runners-up: Catalans Dragons
- Biggest home win: Catalans Dragons 64–0 Leigh Centurions (30 August)
- Biggest away win: Castleford Tigers 6–60 Leeds Rhinos (28 May)
- Man of Steel: (England) Sam Tomkins
- Top point-scorer: (Australia) James Maloney (226)
- Top try-scorer: (Samoa) Ken Sio (19)

Promotion and relegation
- Promoted from Championship: Toulouse Olympique
- Relegated to Championship: Leigh Centurions

Super League XXVI, known as the 2021 Betfred Super League XXVI for sponsorship reasons, was the 26th season of the Super League and 127th season of rugby league in Great Britain.

The 2021 season was originally scheduled to begin on 11 March 2021, however, on 14 January 2021, it was announced that all clubs had agreed to push the start date back by two weeks, to increase the chances of fans being able to attend matches.

St Helens were the reigning champions going into Super League XXVI, after successfully retaining their title against Wigan Warriors, in the Grand Final.

Super League XXVI also saw the return of the Magic Weekend, which took place at St James' Park in Newcastle, after it was cancelled in 2020 due to the COVID-19 pandemic.

Upon the expulsion of Toronto Wolfpack the previous season, a vacancy was available for the 2021 season. Six eligible Championship clubs; Leigh Centurions, Bradford Bulls, York City Knights, London Broncos, Featherstone Rovers, and Toulouse Olympique all applied, with Leigh being promoted following a unanimous decision by an independent panel.

Catalans Dragons won the League Leaders Shield for the first time in the club's history and also became the first non English team to reach their first ever Grand Final.

St Helens won their 3rd Grand Final in a row, (9th title overall), after narrowly beating Catalans Dragons 12-10 at Old Trafford on 9 October 2021.

== Effects of the Covid-19 pandemic ==
The sport continued to be affected by the COVID-19 pandemic. The first five rounds of matches were all played behind closed doors, and it was only from mid-May that spectators were allowed in the grounds, with attendances limited to 10,000 or 25% of the ground capacity. The Rugby Football League anticipated that COVID-19 would have an effect, and made two important changes to the organisation of the season.

Firstly, the league table would be decided by win percentage rather than competition points. Secondly, a set of protocols was introduced, allowing for matches to be postponed, if a team had seven or more players from the senior squad unavailable, due to either close contact or a positive COVID-19 test.

== Rule changes ==
As in 2020, scrums will not be formed and instead, minor ruck infringements by the defending team, will result in a repeat set of six tackles for the attacking team. Dual registration will not be allowed, but loans will be, with the minimum load period reduced to fourteen days.

== Teams ==
Locations of Super League XXVI teams
Locations of Super League XXVI teams

Legend
Reigning Champions
Previous season League Leaders
Promoted

Team	2020 position	Stadium	Capacity	City/Area
Castleford Tigers (2021 season)	8th	Wheldon Road	12,000	Castleford, West Yorkshire
Catalans Dragons (2021 season)	4th	Stade Gilbert Brutus	13,000	Perpignan, Pyrénées-Orientales, France
Huddersfield Giants (2021 season)	7th	Kirklees Stadium	24,121	Huddersfield, West Yorkshire
Hull FC (2021 season)	6th	KCOM Stadium	25,400	Kingston upon Hull, East Riding of Yorkshire
Hull KR (2021 season)	11th	Craven Park	12,225	Kingston upon Hull, East Riding of Yorkshire
Leeds Rhinos (2021 season)	5th	Emerald Headingley	21,062	Leeds, West Yorkshire
Leigh Centurions (2021 season)	4th (2019 Championship)	Leigh Sports Village	12,000	Leigh, Greater Manchester
Salford Red Devils (2021 season)	9th	AJ Bell Stadium	12,000	Salford, Greater Manchester
St Helens (2021 season)	2nd (Champions)	Totally Wicked Stadium	18,000	St Helens, Merseyside
Wakefield Trinity (2021 season)	10th	Belle Vue	9,333	Wakefield, West Yorkshire
Warrington Wolves (2021 season)	3rd	Halliwell Jones Stadium	15,200	Warrington, Cheshire
Wigan Warriors (2021 season)	1st (runners up)	DW Stadium	25,133	Wigan, Greater Manchester

== Fixtures and results ==
Super League Europe announced in February 2021 that the matches in round 2 would be played to support retired player Mose Masoe in his rehabilitation from a serious back injury suffered during a game in 2020.

In the round 3 game on 16 April 2021 between Hull KR and Huddersfield, Ben Crooks of Hull KR, scored a try after only seven seconds, a new record, after Sam Wood missed the ball from the kick off allowing Crooks to score. Hull KR went on to win 25–24. This achievement beat not only beat the previous fastest score in Super League (St Helens' Tim Jonkers scored after 14 seconds against Wakefield Trinity during the 2002 season) but also the fastest try scored in the NRL, which was set in 2017 (Kirisome Auva'a scored after 11 seconds for Parramatta Eels against Brisbane Broncos).

=== Golden point extra time ===
If a match ends in a draw after 80 minutes, then a further 10 minutes of golden point extra time is played, to determine a winner (5 minutes each way). The first team to score either a try, goal or drop goal during this period, will win the match. However, if there are no further scores during the additional 10 minutes period, then the match will end in a draw.

==== Game 1 (Catalans v Hull KR) ====
The first game to go to golden-point, was the round 1 game between Catalans and Hull KR on 27 March 2021. Catalans won the match 29–28, with a drop goal from James Maloney, after the scores were tied at 28-all after 80 minutes.

==== Game 2 (Hull FC v Warrington Wolves) ====
The round 3 game between Hull FC and Warrington on 18 April 2021, finished 14-all after 80 minutes. The game then went to extra time which saw numerous drop goal attempts by both teams. With neither team able to score any points during the extra 10 minutes, the match ended as a draw for the first time since golden point was introduced into Super League.

==== Game 3 (Leeds Rhinos v Wakefield Trinity) ====
The third game to go to golden-point, was the round 6 game between Leeds Rhinos and Wakefield Trinity on 14 May 2021. Leeds won the match 15–13, with a penalty goal from Rhyse Martin, after the scores were tied at 13-all after 80 minutes.

==== Game 4 (St Helens v Catalans) ====
The fourth game to go to golden-point, was the round 23 game between St Helens and Catalans Dragons on 4 September 2021, during the 2nd game of the day 1 fixtures, at the Magic Weekend. Catalans won the match 31–30, with a drop goal from James Maloney, after the scores were tied at 30-all after 80 minutes (Catalans scoring three tries in the final 4 minutes of the game to come back from 30-12 down). This was the first time in Super League history that a Magic Weekend game had gone to extra time (previous draws at Magic Weekend coming before the introduction of Golden Point to Super League).

==== Game 5 (Leeds v Hull FC) ====
The fifth game to go to golden-point, was the round 23 game between Leeds Rhinos and Hull FC on 4 September 2021, during the 3rd game of the day 1 fixtures, at the Magic Weekend. Leeds won the match 25–24, with a drop goal from Kruise Leeming, after the scores were tied at 24-all after 80 minutes. This was the second time in Super League that a magic weekend game had gone to extra time.

==== Game 6 (Warrington v Salford) ====
The sixth game to go to golden-point, was the round 24 game between Warrington Wolves and Salford Red Devils on 11 September 2021. Warrington won the match 20–19, with a drop goal from George Williams, after the scores were tied at 19-all after 80 minutes.

=== Forfeited games ===
In June Castleford Tigers were forced to forfeit their round 12 match against St Helens. With only fourteen senior players available due to injury and COVID-19 precautions Castleford could not raise a team and forfeited the game. The RFL described it as "an unusual range of circumstances" but as less than seven of the absences were due to COVID-19 among the senior squad the match did not meet the criteria for postponement under the RFL's COVID-19 protocols. For statistical recording and league placing the match was recorded as a 24–0 victory to St Helens.

Huddersfield became the second Super League team to forfeit a game in 2021 when the round 13 match against Castleford was cancelled on 4 July. Huddersfield announced that they were missing 20+ players due to COVID-19 and injury but as the number unavailable due to COVID-19 was less than the minimum seven absences required for the game to be postponed under the RFL COVID-19 protocols, Huddersfield had to forfeit the match.

== Regular season table ==
When the season details were announced the original method was for the league to revert to the normal determination, (i.e. league points won). On 7 March 2021, the Rugby Football League (RFL) announced that, league positions would be determined as they were in 2020 with league position decided by win percentage (Win percentage = number of league points ÷ number of games played x 50). If two or more teams have equal win percentages, then position will be determined by points scored percentage (points scored ÷ points conceded x 100).

To qualify for the play-offs, a team had to complete 70% of their scheduled fixtures (18 matches out of 25) – unless they earned a position, in the top six through league points despite having played fewer than 18 matches.

Pos	Team	Pld	W	D	L	PF	PA	PP	Pts	PCT	Qualification (Note: Teams must have played at least 70% of scheduled fixtures to qualify for the play-offs.)
1	Catalans Dragons (L)	23	19	0	4	688	398	172.9	38	82.61	Semi-final
2	St. Helens (C)	21	16	0	5	548	229	239.3	32	76.19	Semi-final
3	Warrington Wolves	21	15	1	5	588	354	166.1	31	73.81	Elimination Semi-finals
4	Wigan Warriors	25	15	0	10	387	385	100.5	30	60.00	Elimination Semi-finals
5	Leeds Rhinos	24	13	0	11	556	440	126.4	26	54.17	Elimination Semi-finals
6	Hull Kingston Rovers	20	10	0	10	497	458	108.5	20	50.00	Elimination Semi-finals
7	Castleford Tigers	23	11	0	12	437	552	79.2	22	47.83	
8	Hull FC	21	8	1	12	409	476	85.9	17	40.48	
9	Huddersfield Giants	24	9	0	15	460	516	89.1	18	37.50	
10	Wakefield Trinity	24	9	0	15	482	548	88.0	18	37.50	
11	Salford Red Devils	22	7	0	15	402	584	68.8	14	31.82	
12	Leigh Centurions (R)	22	2	0	20	356	870	40.9	4	9.09	Relegated to the Championship

Rules for classification: 1) win percentage; 2) points scored percentage (points scored divided by points conceded).
(C) Champions; (L) League Leaders' Shield Winners; (R) Relegated

== Play-offs ==
The top 2 teams who finished first and second respectively in the regular season table (Catalans Dragons and St Helens respectively, had byes to the semi-finals. The four teams who finish third to sixth contested in two elimination finals, with the winner of those two games moving on to the semi-finals (Hull Kingston Rovers and Leeds Rhinos respectively). Catalans became the first non English team in Super League Era, to reach the Grand Final after they beat Hull Kingston Rovers 28–10 in the first semi-final on 30 September.

=== Team bracket ===
Eliminators
3	Warrington Wolves	0
6	Hull Kingston Rovers	19
4	Wigan Warriors	0
5	Leeds Rhinos	8

Semi-finals
1	Catalans Dragons	28
6	Hull Kingston Rovers	10
2	St Helens	36
5	Leeds Rhinos	8

Grand Final
1	Catalans Dragons	10
2	St Helens	12

=== Week 1: Eliminators ===
23 September 2021
19:45 BST (UTC+01)

Wigan Warriors	0–8	Leeds Rhinos
	Report (RFL); Report (Sky Sports)	Tries: Handley 50'; Goals: Martin 51', 74' (pen)

DW Stadium, Wigan
Attendance: 7,396
Referee: Robert Hicks

24 September 2021
19:45 BST (UTC+01)

Warrington Wolves	0–19	Hull Kingston Rovers
	Report (RFL); Report (Sky Sports)	Tries: Abdull 17'; Lewis 48'; Keinhorst 68'; Goals: Abdull 18', 49', 57' (pen); Drop goals: Abdull 73'

Halliwell Jones Stadium, Warrington
Attendance: 6,252
Referee: Liam Moore

=== Week 2: Semi-finals ===
30 September 2021
19:45 CEST (UTC+02)

Catalans Dragons	28–10	Hull Kingston Rovers
Tries: Garcia 9'; Drinkwater 31'; Mourgue 41'; Yaha 62'; Chan 68'; Goals: Maloney 10', 32', 69', 80' (pen)	Report (RFL); Report (Sky Sports)	Tries: Kenny Dowall 35'; Hall 75'; Goals: Abdull 76'

Stade Gilbert Brutus, Perpignan
Attendance: 11,530
Referee: James Child

1 October 2021
19:45 BST (UTC+01)

St Helens	36–8	Leeds Rhinos
Tries: Grace 6' 78'; Roby 24'; Percival 51', 73'; Naiqama 60'; Goals: Coote 14' (pen), 22' (pen), 25', 61', 74', 79'	Report (RFL); Report (Sky Sports)	Tries: T. Briscoe (yellow card) 21'; Myler 38'; L. Briscoe 68'

Totally Wicked Stadium, St Helens
Attendance: 11,688
Referee: Chris Kendall

=== Week 3: Grand Final ===
9 October 2021
18:00 BST (UTC+01)

Catalans Dragons	10–12	St Helens
Tries: McMeeken 50'; Goals: Maloney 9' (pen), 27' (pen), 51'	Report (RFL); Report (Sky Sports)	Tries: Naiqama 13' 66; Makinson (yellow card) 45'; Goals: Coote 21' (pen), 67'

Old Trafford, Manchester
Attendance: 45,177
Referee: Liam Moore
Harry Sunderland Award:
Kevin Naiqama (St Helens)

== Player statistics ==
=== Top 10 try scorers ===
Rank	Player	Club	Tries
1	(Australia) Ken Sio	Salford Red Devils	18
2=	(England) Ryan Hall	Hull KR	16
2=	(Australia) Jake Mamo	Warrington Wolves	16
4	(England) Tom Davies	Catalans Dragons	15
5=	(France) Fouad Yaha	Catalans Dragons	14
5=	(Wales) Regan Grace	St Helens	14
7=	(England) Jordan Turner	Castleford Tigers	13
7=	(England) Adam Swift	Hull FC	13
7=	(England) Jack Welsby	St Helens	13
7=	(England) Jake Bibby	Wigan Warriors	13

=== Top 10 try assists ===
Rank	Player	Club	Assists
1	(Australia) Josh Drinkwater	Catalans Dragons	28
2	(England) Jake Connor	Hull FC	22
3	(England) Sam Tomkins	Catalans Dragons	20
4=	(Tonga) Tui Lolohea	Salford Red Devils	18
4=	(United Kingdom) Jackson Hastings	Wigan Warriors	18
6	(Scotland) Lachlan Coote	St Helens	16
7=	(England) Niall Evalds	Castleford Tigers	15
7=	(England) Richie Myler	Leeds Rhinos	15
7=	(England) Jacob Miller	Wakefield Trinity	15
10=	(Papua New Guinea) Kruise Leeming	Leeds Rhinos	14
10=	(England) Jonny Lomax	St Helens	14
10=	(England) Harry Smith	Wigan Warriors	14

=== Top 10 goal scorers ===
Rank	Player	Club	Goals	Missed Goals	Drop Goals	Goal Percentage
1	(Australia) James Maloney	Catalans Dragons	101	15	5	88%
2	(Papua New Guinea) Rhyse Martin	Leeds Rhinos	83	15	0	83%
3	(Samoa) Mason Lino	Wakefield Trinity	75	9	1	89%
4	(Scotland) Lachlan Coote	St Helens	72	19	0	79%
5	(England) Stefan Ratchford	Warrington Wolves	71	14	0	82%
6	(England) Marc Sneyd	Hull FC	60	15	2	80%
7	(England) Danny Richardson	Castleford Tigers	46	11	3	80%
8	(England) Jordan Abdull	Hull KR	43	17	0	82%
9	(New Zealand) Krisnan Inu	Salford Red Devils	42	10	1	80%
10	(England) Oliver Russell	Huddersfield Giants	32	9	0	78%

=== Top 10 points scorers ===
Rank	Player	Club	Points
1	(Australia) James Maloney	Catalans Dragons	245
2	(Scotland) Lachlan Coote	St Helens	188
3	(Samoa) Mason Lino	Wakefield Trinity	171
4	(Papua New Guinea) Rhyse Martin	Leeds Rhinos	166
5	(England) Stefan Ratchford	Warrington Wolves	146
6	(England) Marc Sneyd	Hull FC	122
7	(England) Jordan Abdull	Hull KR	114
8	(England) Danny Richardson	Castleford Tigers	99
10	(England) Ryan Brierley	Leigh Centurions	98
10	(New Zealand) Krisnan Inu	Salford Red Devils	96

- Updated to match(es) played on 5 September 2021 (Round 23)

== Discipline ==
Red Cards

Rank	Player	Club	Red Cards
1=	(England) Joe Greenwood	Huddersfield Giants	1
1=	(England) Josh Jones	Huddersfield Giants	1
1=	(Australia) Andre Savelio	Hull FC	1
1=	(Fiji) Korbin Sims	Hull KR	1
1=	(Australia) Pauli Pauli	Salford Red Devils	1
1=	(England) Jack Ashworth	Leigh Centurions	1
1=	(England) Bodene Thompson	Leeds Rhinos	1
1=	(England) Tommy Makinson	St Helens	1
1=	(England) Mike Cooper	Warrington Wolves	1
1=	(England) Zak Hardaker	Wigan Warriors	1
1=	(England) Brad Singleton	Wigan Warriors	1

Yellow Cards

Rank	Player	Club	Yellow Cards
1	(Ireland) James Bentley	St Helens	4
2	(England) Richie Myler	Leeds Rhinos	3
3=	(Samoa) Jesse Sene-Lefao	Castleford Tigers	2
3=	(Samoa) Peter Mata'utia	Castleford Tigers	2
3=	(Australia) James Maloney	Catalans Dragons	2
3=	(England) Oliver Russell	Huddersfield Giants	2
3=	(Australia) Ligi Sao	Hull FC	2
3=	(Samoa) Carlos Tuimavave	Hull FC	2
3=	(Scotland) James Bell	Leigh Centurions	2
3=	(England) Ryan Lannon	Salford Red Devils	2
3=	(Ireland) James Bentley	St Helens	2
3=	(England) John Bateman	Wigan Warriors	2
3=	(New Zealand) Willie Isa	Wigan Warriors	2
14=	(England) George Griffin	Castleford Tigers	1
14=	(England) Danny Richardson	Castleford Tigers	1
14=	(France) Jason Baitieri	Catalans Dragons	1
14=	(France) Julian Bousquet	Catalans Dragons	1
14=	(France) Joe Chan	Catalans Dragons	1
14=	(Australia) Josh Drinkwater	Catalans Dragons	1
14=	(Wales) Gil Dudson	Catalans Dragons	1
14=	(New Zealand) Sam Kasiano	Catalans Dragons	1
14=	(England) Michael Mcilorum	Catalans Dragons	1
14=	(England) Joel Tomkins	Catalans Dragons	1
14=	(England) Sam Tomkins	Catalans Dragons	1
14=	(England) Leroy Cudjoe	Huddersfield Giants	1
14=	(England) Chris McQueen	Huddersfield Giants	1
14=	(New Zealand) Kenny Edwards	Huddersfield Giants	1
14=	(England) Jake Connor	Hull FC	1
14=	(United States) Bureta Faraimo	Hull FC	1
14=	(England) Jordan Johnstone	Hull FC	1
14=	(Australia) Josh Reynolds	Hull FC	1
14=	(Australia) Chris Satae	Hull FC	1
14=	(England) Marc Sneyd	Hull FC	1
14=	(England) Scott Taylor	Hull FC	1
14=	(England) Luis Johnson	Hull KR	1
14=	(England) George King	Hull KR	1
14=	(England) George Lawler	Hull KR	1
14=	(Australia) Matt Parcell	Hull KR	1
14=	(Australia) Brad Takairangi		1
14=	(Tonga) Albert Vete		1
14=	(England) Luke Gale	Leeds Rhinos	1
14=	(Australia) Robert Lui	Leeds Rhinos	1
14=	(Australia) Matt Prior	Leeds Rhinos	1
14=	(England) Liam Sutcliffe	Leeds Rhinos	1
14=	(New Zealand) Zane Tetevano	Leeds Rhinos	1
14=	(England) Chris Atkin	Salford Red Devils	1
14=	(England) Greg Burke	Salford Red Devils	1
14=	(France) Morgan Escare	Salford Red Devils	1
14=	(Tonga) Ata Hingano	Salford Red Devils	1
14=	(New Zealand) Sebastine Ikahihifo	Salford Red Devils	1
14=	(Tonga) Tui Lolohea	Salford Red Devils	1
14=	(England) Jack Wells	Salford Red Devils	1
14=	(Australia) Sione Mata'utia	St Helens	1
14=	(England) Mark Percival	St Helens	1
14=	(England) James Batchelor	Wakefield Trinity	1
14=	(England) Chris Green	Wakefield Trinity	1
14=	(Samoa) Mason Lino	Wakefield Trinity	1
14=	(England) Jacob Miller	Wakefield Trinity	1
14=	(England) Tom Lineham	Warrington Wolves	1
14=	(Australia) Jake Mamo	Warrington Wolves	1
14=	(England) Gareth Widdop	Warrington Wolves	1
14=	(Ireland) Liam Byrne	Wigan Warriors	1
14=	(England) Liam Farrell	Wigan Warriors	1
14=	(England) Oliver Partington	Wigan Warriors	1
14=	(England) Kai Pearce-Paul	Wigan Warriors	1
14=	(England) Morgan Smithies	Wigan Warriors	1

- Updated to match(es) played on 30 August 2021 (Round 22)

== Attendances ==
Club attendances

Club	Home Games	Total	Average	Highest	Lowest
Castleford Tigers	2	3,600	1,800	3,600	3,600
Catalans Dragons	3	1,000	500	1,000	1,000
Huddersfield Giants	2				
Hull FC	3	5,527	1,842	5,527	5,527
Hull KR	2				
Leeds Rhinos	3	4,000	1,333	4,000	4,000
Leigh Centurions	2	3,708	1,854	2,008	1,700
Salford Red Devils	2	4,000	2,000	4,000	4,000
St Helens	2	4,000	2,000	4,000	4,000
Wakefield Trinity	2				
Warrington Wolves	2	8,000	4,000	4,000	4,000
Wigan Warriors	2				

Top 10 attendances

Rank	Home club	Away club	Stadium	Attendance
1	Magic Weekend: Day 1		St James' Park	35,104
2	Magic Weekend: Day 2		St James' Park	25,762
3	Wigan Warriors	St Helens	DW Stadium	16,319
4	Hull FC	Hull KR	MKM Stadium	15,000
5	Leeds Rhinos	Castleford Tigers	Emerald Headingley	10,838
6	Wigan Warriors	Salford Red Devils	DW Stadium	9,434
7	Wigan Warriors	Leigh Centurions	DW Stadium	9,206
8	Warrington Wolves	Wigan Warriors	Halliwell Jones Stadium	8,014
9	Wigan Warriors	Wakefield Trinity	DW Stadium	5,555
10	Wigan Warriors	Warrington Wolves	DW Stadium	5,537

== End-of-season awards ==
The Super League end of season awards were announced on 4 October. The award winners were:

- Steve Prescott Man of Steel: (England) Sam Tomkins (Catalans Dragons)
- Woman of Steel: (England) Jodie Cunningham (St Helens)
- Coach of the year: (England) Steve McNamara (Catalans Dragons)
- Top tackler: (England) Joe Shorrocks (Wigan Warriors) 833 Tackles
- Top Metre-maker: (England) Tom Davies (Catalans Dragons) 3,332 Meters
- Top Try Scorer: (Australia) Ken Sio (Salford) 19 Tries
- Young player of the year: (England) Jack Welsby (St Helens)
- Spirit of Super League: (England) Kevin Sinfield

=== Steve Prescott Man of Steel Nominees ===
Rank	Player	Club
1	(England) Sam Tomkins	Catalans Dragons
2	(England) Jordan Abdull	Hull KR
3	(England) Jake Connor	Hull FC
4	(England) Jonny Lomax	St Helens
5	(England) Gareth Widdop	Warrington Wolves
Here are the 5 nominees for the 2021 Steve Prescott Man Of Steel
