= Savelio =

Savelio is a surname. Notable people with the surname include:

- Andre Savelio (born 1995), New Zealand professional rugby league footballer
- Demetrius Savelio (born 1981), better known as Savage, New Zealand rapper
