= Ellis Longstaff =

English professional rugby league footballer

Personal information
- Full name: Ellis Longstaff
- Born: 5 July 2002 (age 24) Pontefract, West Yorkshire, England
- Height: 6 ft 0 in (1.84 m)
- Weight: 14 st 2 lb (90 kg)

Playing information
- Position: Second-row
Club
Years	Team	Pld	T	G	FG	P
2020–23	Warrington Wolves	14	0	0	0	0
2021(loan)	→ Newcastle Thunder	2	0	0	0	0
2022(loan)	→ Hull FC	10	6	0	0	24
2023(loan)–	→ Salford Red Devils	9	1	0	0	4
2023	Featherstone Rovers	4	1	0	0	4
	Total	39	8	0	0	32
Representative
Years	Team	Pld	T	G	FG	P
2021–22	England Knights	4	1	0	0	4
- Source: As of 26 July 2023

Ellis Longstaff (born 5 July 2002) is a former professional rugby league footballer who played as a second-row forward for the Salford Red Devils in the Super League. He has played for the England Knights at international level.

He has previously spent time on loan from Warrington at the Newcastle Thunder in the Championship and Hull FC in the Super League.

== Career ==
Longstaff is a product of the Elite Rugby Academy and is the first individual of the academy to go professional since its initial launch in 2012.

Longstaff has previously played for Kippax Welfare ARLFC and was part of the youth development program at the Wigan club.

=== Warrington Wolves ===
Longstaff made his Super League debut in round 11 of the 2020 Super League season for Warrington against Hull F.C.

=== Hull F.C. ===
During the 2022 Super League season, Longstaff joined Hull F.C. on a short-term loan deal. In round 18 of the 2022 season, Longstaff scored two tries for Hull F.C. in their 34–28 victory over Hull Kingston Rovers at Magic Weekend.

=== Salford ===
In the 2023 Super League season, Longstaff played nine matches for Salford as the club finished 7th on the table and missed the playoffs.

=== Featherstone Rovers ===
On 26 July 2023, Longstaff joined Featherstone Rovers on a permanent deal.

=== England Knights ===
At the end of the 2021 season, he went on to make his England knights debut against Jamaica on the 15th October 2021.
