= Kieran Buchanan =

Scotland international rugby league footballer

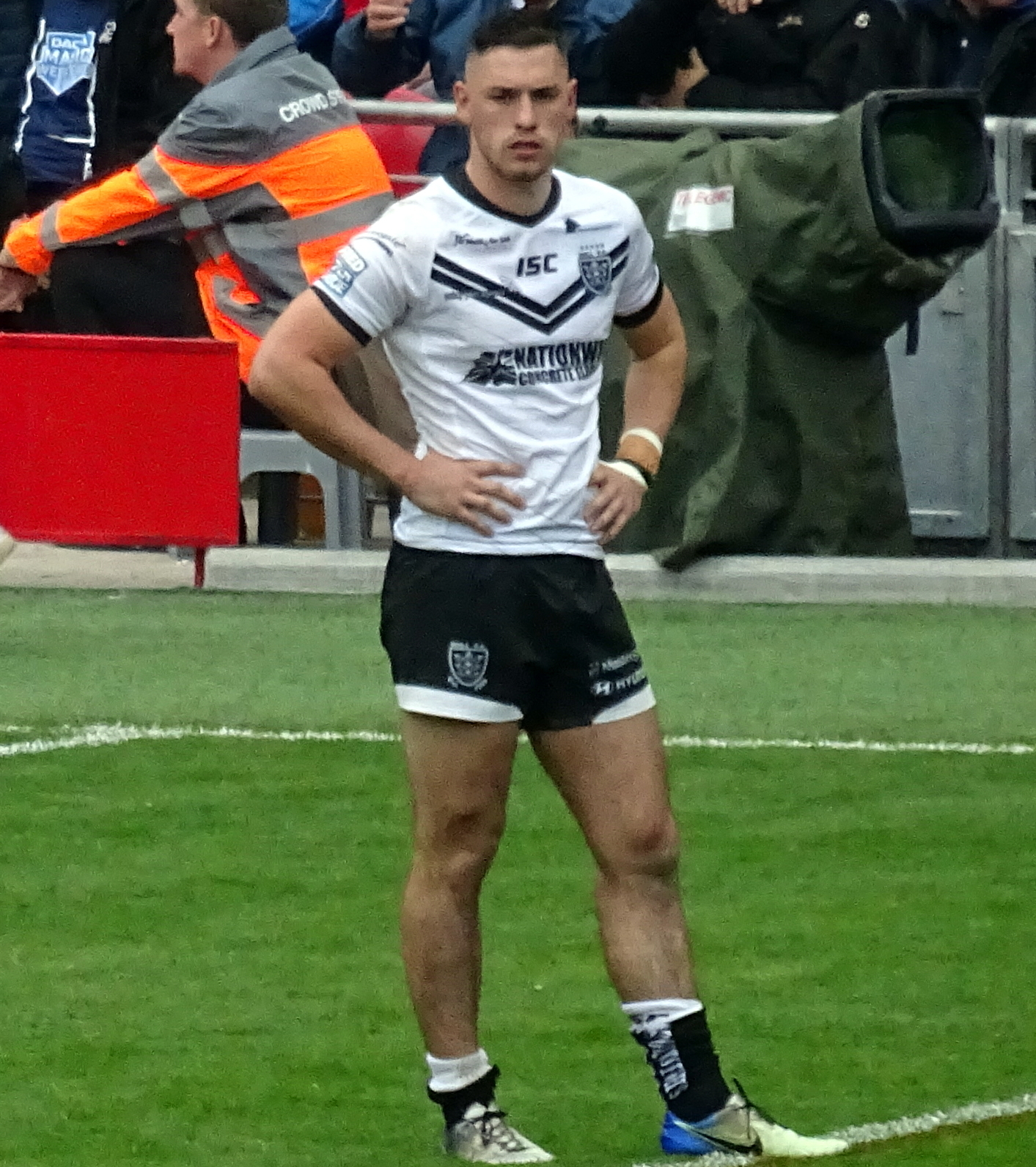

Personal information
- Full name: Kieran Buchanan
- Born: 26 January 1999 (age 27) Hull, East Riding of Yorkshire, England
- Height: 6 ft 0 in (1.84 m)
- Weight: 14 st 9 lb (93 kg)

Playing information
- Position: Centre, Wing, Fullback
Club
Years	Team	Pld	T	G	FG	P
2019–20	Hull F.C.	13	3	0	0	12
2019(loan)	→ Doncaster	6	3	7	0	26
2021–24	Batley Bulldogs	116	26	0	0	104
2025–	York Knights	32	7	0	0	28
	Total	167	39	7	0	170
Representative
Years	Team	Pld	T	G	FG	P
2022–	Scotland	4	0	0	0	0
- Source: As of 15 February 2026

Kieran Buchanan (born 26 January 1999) is a Scotland international rugby league footballer who plays as a centre, winger or fullback for the York Knights in the Betfred Super League.

He has previously played for Hull F.C. in the Super League and spent time on loan from Hull at Doncaster in League 1.

== Background ==
Buchanan was born in Kingston upon Hull, East Riding of Yorkshire, England. He is of Scottish descent.

== Career ==
=== Hull FC ===
In 2019, he made his Super League début for Hull F.C. against the Catalans Dragons.

=== Batley Bulldogs ===
On 11 September 2020, it was announced that Buchanan would join the Batley Bulldogs for the 2021 season.

=== York Knights ===
On 12 November 2024, it was reported that he had signed for York in the RFL Championship on a two-year deal. On 7 June 2025, he played in York's 1895 Cup final victory over Featherstone.

=== International ===
He made his international debut for Scotland on 16 October 2022 in their opening fixture of the 2021 World Cup, a 28-4 defeat to Italy.
