= Ratu Naulago =

Fijian rugby league footballer

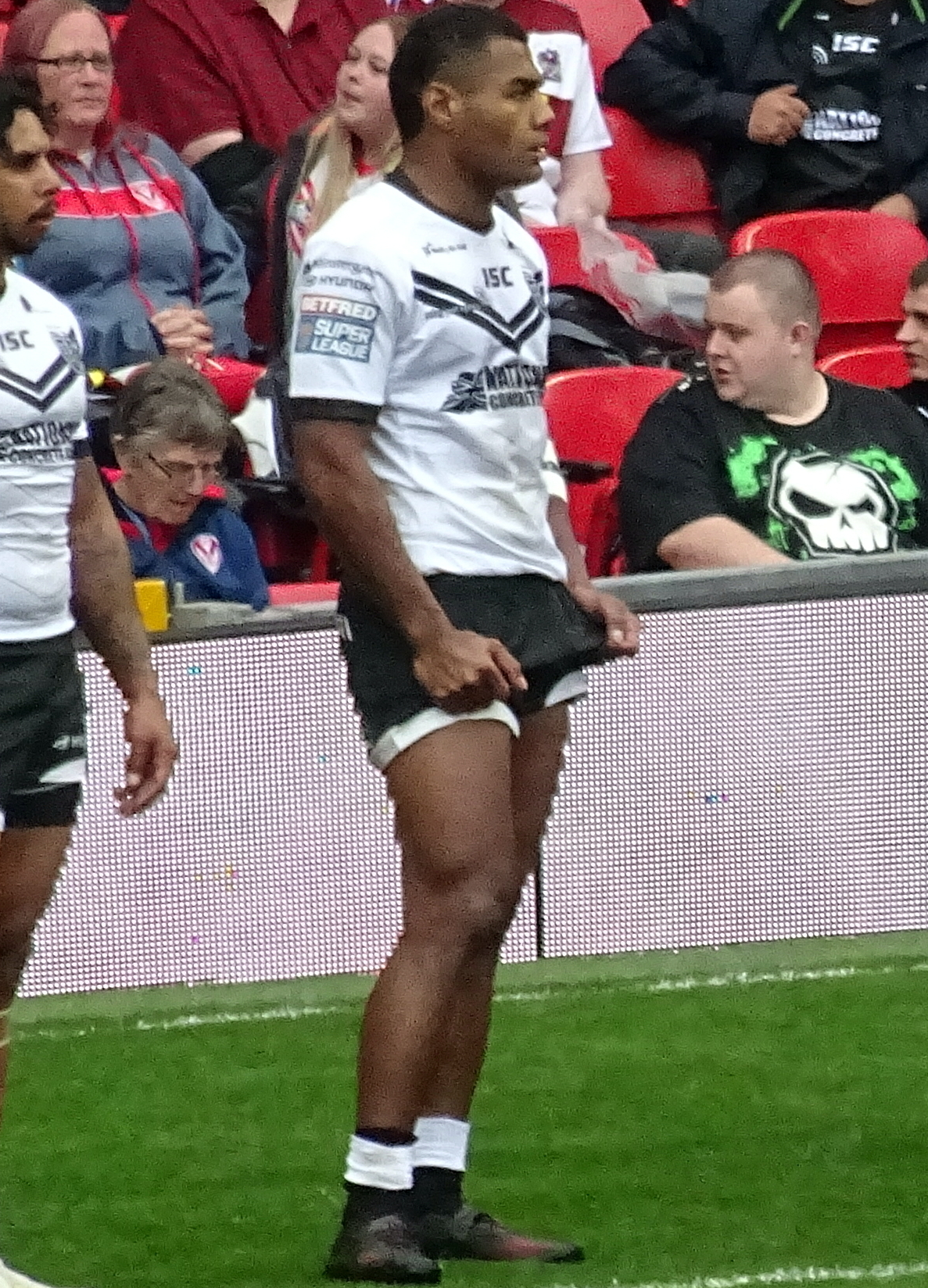

Personal information
- Full name: Ratu Siva Naulago
- Born: 6 August 1991 (age 34) Fiji
- Height: 6 ft 0 in (1.84 m)
- Weight: 14 st 13 lb (95 kg)

Playing information

Rugby league
- Position: Wing
Club
Years	Team	Pld	T	G	FG	P
2019–20	Hull F.C.	34	23	0	0	92

Rugby union
- Position: Wing
Club
Years	Team	Pld	T	G	FG	P
2020–25	Bristol Bears	45	21	0	0	105
2025–	Worcester Warriors	4	3	0	0	15
	Total	49	24	0	0	120
- Source: As of 09 May 2026

Ratu Siva Naulago (born 6 August 1991) is a Fijian professional rugby union footballer who plays as a winger for the Bristol Bears in the Gallagher Premiership Rugby.

He previously played rugby league for Hull F.C. in the Super League.

== Background ==
Naulago was born in Fiji.

Naulago is a Private in the Yorkshire Regiment and served in Cyprus for two years before being based in Warminster, Wiltshire, and playing rugby union as a 'guest player' for Bath Rugby and Saracens F.C. Sevens team, who he helped to the Premiership title.

== Playing career ==
=== Rugby league ===
In 2019 he made his Super League debut for Hull F.C. against the Wigan Warriors.

=== Rugby union ===
In May 2020 it was announced that Naulago would switch codes and join rugby union side Bristol Bears ahead of the 2020–21 season.
