= Brad Fash =

English professional rugby league footballer

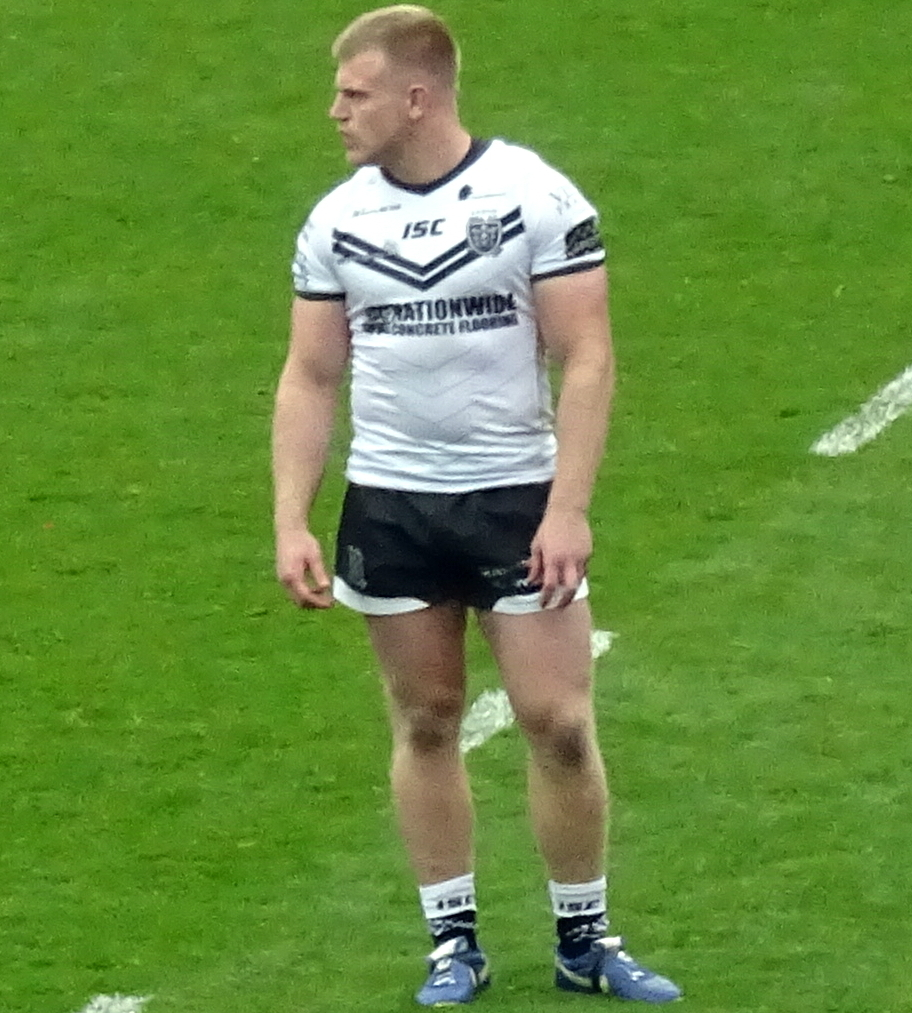

Personal information
- Full name: Bradley Michael Fash
- Born: 24 January 1996 (age 30) Hull, East Riding of Yorkshire, England
- Height: 5 ft 10 in (1.78 m)
- Weight: 15 st 8 lb (99 kg)

Playing information
- Position: Loose forward, Prop
Club
Years	Team	Pld	T	G	FG	P
2015–26	Hull F.C.	203	6	0	0	24
2016(loan)	→ Doncaster	1	0	0	0	0
2016(loan)	→ Leigh Centurions	8	0	0	0	0
2019(loan)	→ Doncaster	1	0	0	0	0
2019(loan)	→ Toronto Wolfpack	2	0	0	0	0
2025(loan)	→ Doncaster	2	0	0	0	0
2027–	York Knights	0	0	0	0	0
	Total	217	6	0	0	24
Representative
Years	Team	Pld	T	G	FG	P
2018–	England Knights	1	0	0	0	0
- Source: As of 9 November 2026

Bradley Michael Fash (born 24 January 1996) is a professional rugby league footballer who currently plays as a loose forward for York Knights in the Super League.

He has spent the majority of his career at his hometown club, Hull FC. He also spent time on loan from Hull at Doncaster in League 1 and the Championship, and the Leigh Centurions and the Toronto Wolfpack in the Championship.

== Background ==
Fash was born in Kingston upon Hull, East Riding of Yorkshire, England.

== Career ==
=== Hull FC ===
Fash made his Hull début on 12 July 2015 in a Super League match against Castleford at the KC Stadium. He played 23 matches for Hull F.C. in the 2017 Super League season which saw the club go to within one game of the grand final. Fash played 17 matches for Hull F.C. in the 2020 Super League season including the clubs semi-final loss against Wigan. Fash played 25 matches for Hull F.C. for in the Super League XXVIII season as the club finished 10th on the table. Fash played 12 games for Hull F.C. in the 2024 Super League season which saw the club finish second last on the table. Fash played 17 matches for Hull F.C. in the 2025 Super League season as the club finished 7th on the table.

On 28 August 2026, it was announced that Fash would leaving Hull F.C. at the end of the 2026 Super League season.

=== York Knights ===
On 9 November 2026, it was announced that he would be joining York Knights for the 2027 Super League season.

== International career ==
In July 2018 he was selected in the England Knights Performance squad. Later that year he was selected for the England Knights on their tour of Papua New Guinea. He played against Papua New Guinea at the Lae Football Stadium.
