= Gareth Ellis =

Former GB & England international rugby league footballer

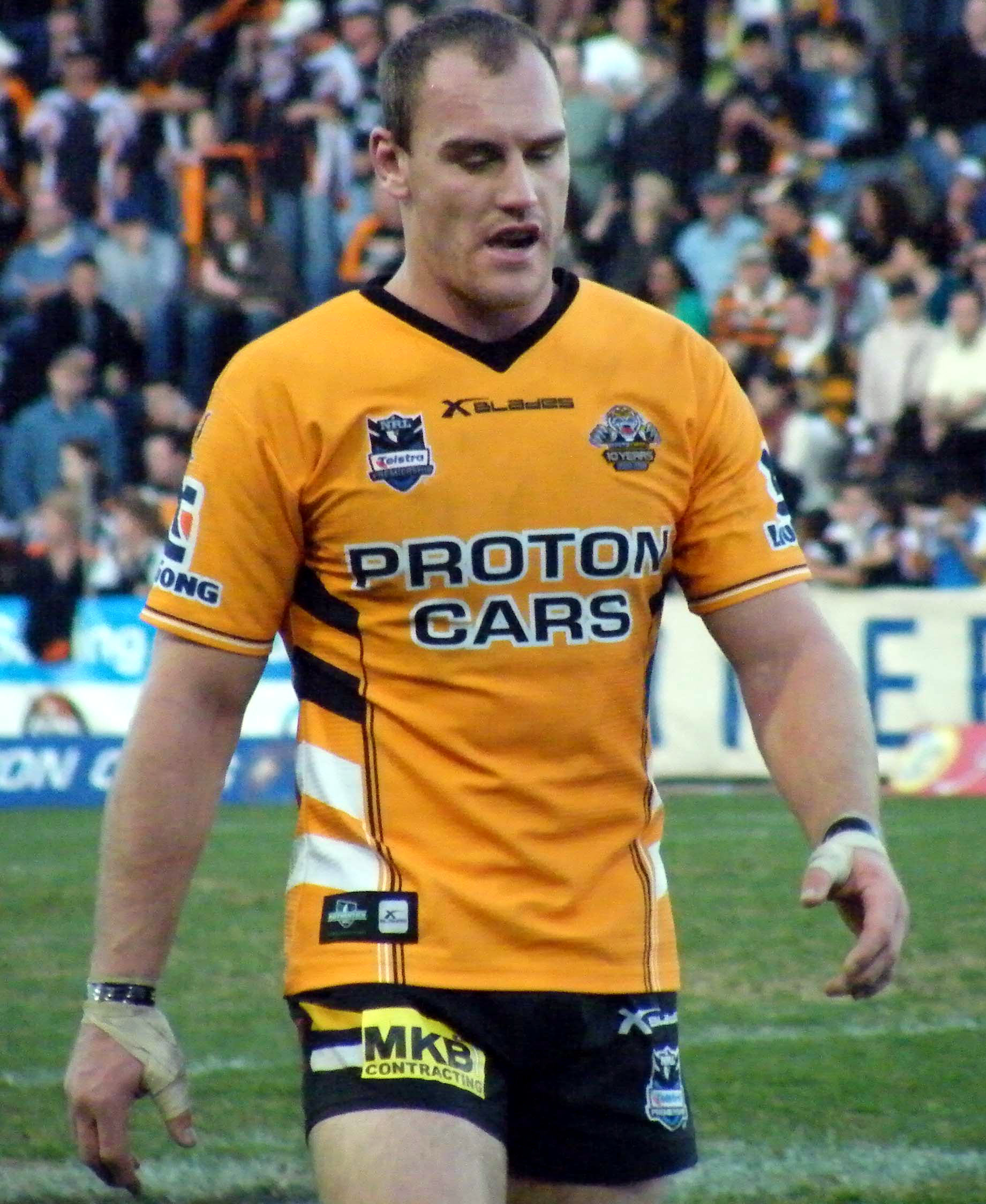

Personal information
- Full name: Gareth Ellis
- Born: 3 May 1981 (age 45) Leeds, West Yorkshire, England

Playing information
- Height: 6 ft 2 in (189 cm)
- Weight: 16 st 12 lb (107 kg)
- Position: Centre, Second-row, Loose forward, Prop
Club
Years	Team	Pld	T	G	FG	P
1999–04	Wakefield Trinity Wildcats	112	25	1	0	102
2005–08	Leeds Rhinos	123	27	1	0	110
2009–12	Wests Tigers	75	10	0	0	40
2013–17	Hull F.C.	99	21	0	0	84
2019–20	Hull F.C.	28	0	0	0	0
	Total	437	83	2	0	336
Representative
Years	Team	Pld	T	G	FG	P
2003–07	Great Britain	17	2	0	0	8
2008–12	England	16	2	0	0	8
	Yorkshire

Gareth Ellis (born 3 May 1981) is an English former professional rugby league footballer who played as a second-row, loose forward and centre in the Super League and the NRL, and England and Great Britain at international level.

He played at club level for the Wakefield Trinity Wildcats, Leeds Rhinos (with whom he won Super League XII's 2007 Super League Grand Final and Super League XIII's 2008 Super League Grand Final), and Hull F.C. in the Super League, and for the Wests Tigers in the NRL. Earlier in his career he played as a centre. He also represented Yorkshire.

== Background ==
Ellis was born in Castleford, West Yorkshire, England.

== Playing career ==
=== Early career ===
Ellis was a junior at Castleford Lock Lane prior to signing for Wakefield Trinity Wildcats' Academy side in 1999.

=== Wakefield Trinity Wildcats ===
Ellis made his first team début in 1999, he broke into the Wakefield Trinity Wildcats team in 2000, and he made over 100 appearances for the Wakefield Trinity Wildcats.

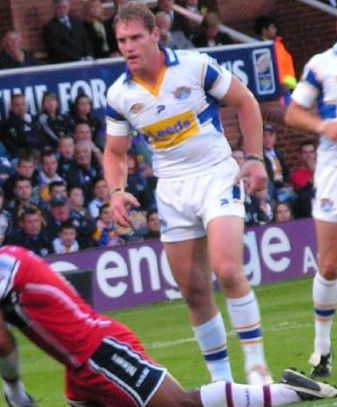
Ellis playing for Leeds in 2007

=== Leeds ===
Gareth Ellis was transferred from the Wakefield Trinity Wildcats to the Leeds Rhinos in 2005. As Super League IX champions, Leeds Rhinos faced 2004 NRL season premiers, Canterbury-Bankstown in the 2005 World Club Challenge. Ellis played at positions in Leeds Rhinos' 39–32 victory. Ellis played for Leeds Rhinos in the 2005 Challenge Cup Final at loose forward in their loss against Hull FC. Ellis also received a 2006 Super League Grand final runners up medal. He played for Leeds Rhinos as a second-row in their 2005 Super League Grand Final loss against the Bradford Bulls.

In February 2008, Ellis agreed to a contract with Australian National Rugby League club, Wests Tigers, for a three-year deal commencing in 2009.

Ellis was named in the Super League Dream Team for 2008's Super League XIII season. He played in the 2008 Super League Grand Final victory over St Helens.

=== Wests Tigers ===
"Gareth Ellis has no body fat, he has an 'eight pack', will run for 200m and leave six players being taken off on stretchers. He has to be the best forward I've ever played with."

— Liam Fulton

"He was the politest man you'd ever meet off the field but on the field he wanted to kill people."

— Aaron Woods

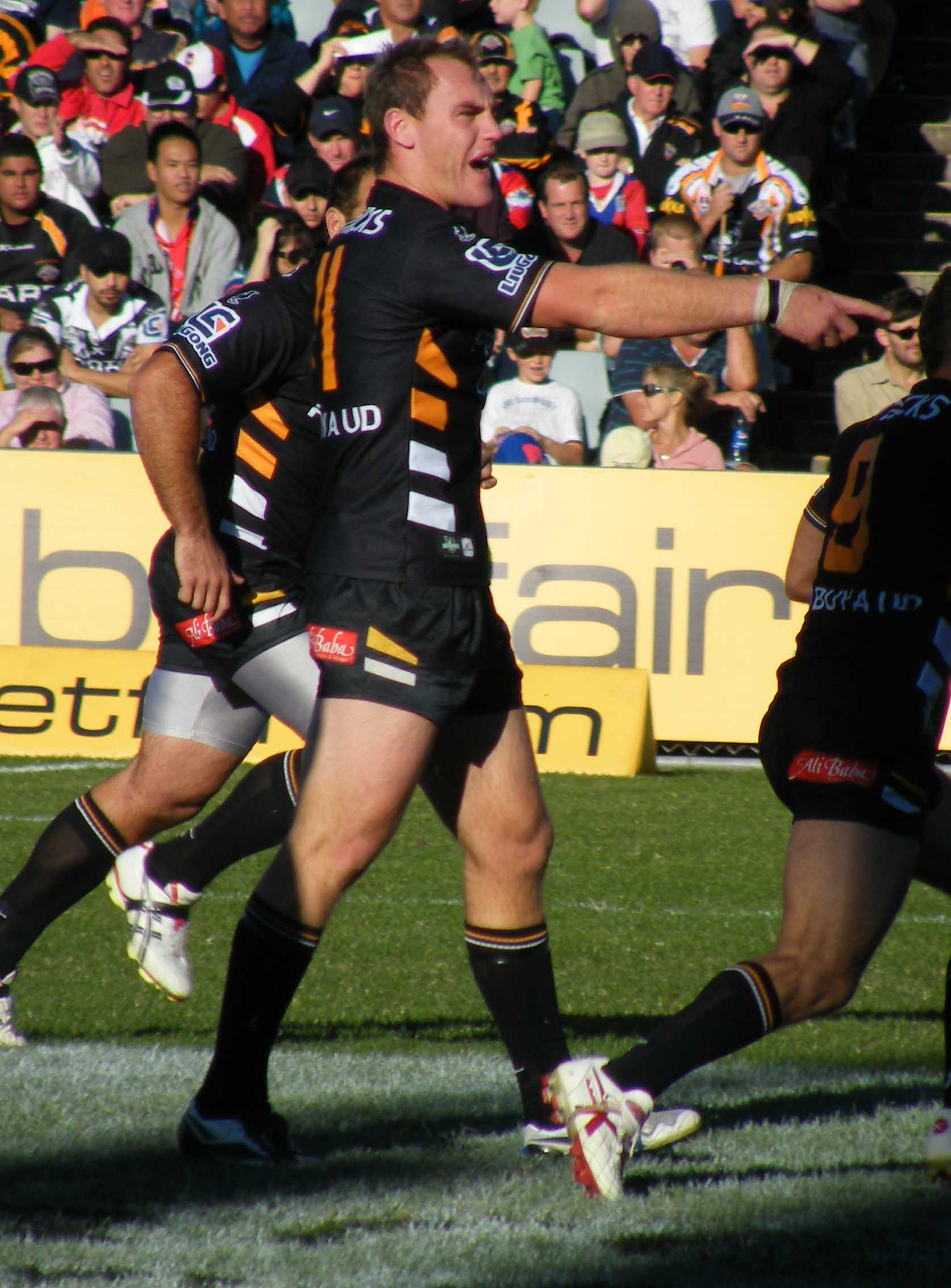
Gareth Ellis playing for the Wests Tigers against the Newcastle Knights at Campbelltown Stadium

Great Britain forward Gareth Ellis cited a lifestyle change and the desire to test himself on the biggest stage for his reasons to quit Super League champions Leeds at the end of the new season. Wests Tigers coach Tim Sheens praised new signing Gareth Ellis on making a decision based purely on a challenge rather than money.

He joined the list of British players who have played for the Wests Tigers joint venture through Balmain Tigers and Western Suburbs Magpies – Andy Currier, Ellery Hanley, Lee Crooks, Garry Schofield and Harvey Howard.

Gareth Ellis became the first Great Britain forward to switch to the NRL since former Sydney Roosters hitman Adrian Morley spent six successful seasons in Australia.

Ellis made his NRL début against the Canberra Raiders in round 1 of 2009, and played in 22 games for the season. After not scoring in 2009, he managed 6 tries in 2010. He produced his first off a toe poke from Robbie Farah in round 1, and scored a double against Penrith in round 23 as the team amassed 43 points.

During his second season with the Wests Tigers, Ellis signed an extension until the end of 2013. Coach Tim Sheens said, "In my time here, dollar-for-dollar, he's been the best buy this club has had."

Reduced to 18 appearances in 2011, Ellis made a trip to Britain mid-season, suffering from an ankle injury and home-sickness. However, he played well enough to be named the Wests Tigers Player of the Year for the third consecutive year.

=== Hull F.C. ===
It was announced on 28 February 2012 that Ellis was looking to return to Super League in 2013 which has sparked a flurry of interest from Super League clubs to sign the player. On 21 March 2012 it was announced he would be joining Super League club Hull FC.

Ellis Captained Hull F.C. to victory at Wembley in the Challenge Cup in two successive seasons 2016 & 2017.

However, Ellis returned to the Hull F.C. playing squad after being retired from the sport for 18 months, helping them end a 13 game losing run. Ellis retired for the 2nd and final time at the end of the 2020 Super League XXV season

== Representative career ==
=== Yorkshire ===
Gareth Ellis won cap(s) for Yorkshire while at Wakefield Trinity Wildcats.

=== Great Britain ===
Ellis became Wakefields first player to represent Great Britain for 12 years in 2003. Ellis first played for the Great Britain team in the final test of the 2003 Ashes series.

He has been capped 17 times for Great Britain and in 2007 was named in the International Team of the Year having started in 11 consecutive Tests for the Lions.

=== England ===
Ellis was selected for the England squad to compete in the 2008 Rugby League World Cup tournament in Australia. Group A's first match against Papua New Guinea he played as a second-row in England's victory.

He was selected to play for England against France in the one-off test in 2010.

== Accolades and awards ==
In November 2008, Ellis was named at second-row in the inaugural Rugby League International Federation's (RLIF) Team of the Year, tying for the position with Anthony Laffranchi. In 2009 he was placed in the side again.

Ellis was named the Wests Tigers Player of the Year for 2009 and also won the Members Player of the Year. He was nominated for the Golden Boot for his efforts throughout the season. He was again named the Tigers Player of the Year in 2010 and 2011.
