= Ligi Sao =

Samoa international rugby league footballer

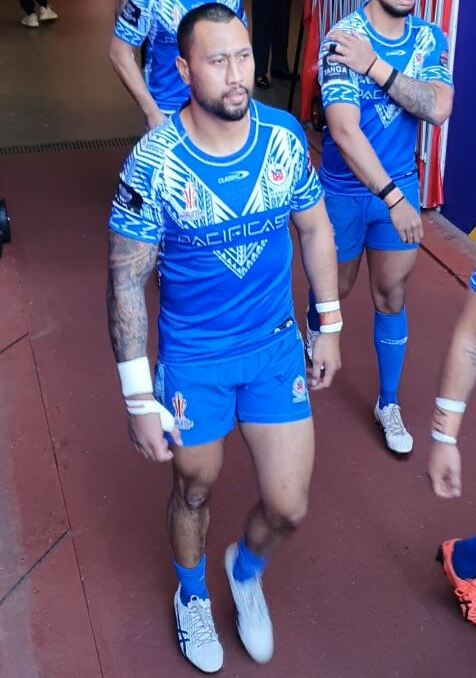

Personal information
- Full name: Liligiifo Sao
- Born: 11 October 1992 (age 33) Auckland, New Zealand
- Height: 6 ft 2 in (1.87 m)
- Weight: 17 st 2 lb (109 kg)

Playing information
- Position: Prop, Loose forward
Club
Years	Team	Pld	T	G	FG	P
2013–15	Manly Sea Eagles	21	2	0	0	8
2016–19	New Zealand Warriors	26	1	0	0	4
2020–26	Hull F.C.	118	5	0	0	20
2027–	Bradford Bulls	0	0	0	0	0
	Total	165	8	0	0	32
Representative
Years	Team	Pld	T	G	FG	P
2018–	Samoa	6	1	0	0	4
2019	Samoa 9s	3	1	0	0	5
2022	Combined Nations All Stars	1	0	0	0	0
- Source: As of 18 September 2026

Liligiifo Sao (born 11 October 1992) is a Samoa international rugby league footballer who plays as a prop and loose forward for Bradford Bulls in the Super League.

Sao previously played for the Manly Warringah Sea Eagles and the New Zealand Warriors in the NRL.

== Background ==
Sao was born in Auckland, New Zealand and is of Samoan descent.

He played his junior football for the Manurewa Marlins in the Auckland Rugby League competition.

== Playing career ==
=== Club career ===
==== Early career ====
He was then signed by the New Zealand Warriors, playing in the 2012 Toyota Cup for the Junior Warriors.

==== Manly-Warringah Sea Eagles ====
In 2013, Sao signed with the Manly-Warringah Sea Eagles. Sao played in both the 2013 Holden Cup and the 2013 NSW Cup before making his first grade debut on 15 July 2013 against the North Queensland Cowboys.

==== New Zealand Warriors ====
On 22 July 2015, three days before they were due to play Manly in Auckland, the Warriors announced that they had signed Sao for the 2016 and 2017 seasons.

==== Hull F.C. ====
He joined Super League side Hull F.C. for the 2020 season. Sao played 16 games for Hull F.C. in the 2020 Super League season including the club's semi-final defeat against Wigan. Sao played 21 games for Hull F.C. in the 2021 Super League season which saw the club finish 8th on the table and miss the playoffs. In round 20 of the 2022 Super League season, Sao was sent off for a dangerous high tackle in Hull FC's 46-18 loss against Castleford. Sao played 17 games for Hull F.C. for in the Super League XXVIII season as the club finished 10th on the table. In round 1 of the 2024 Super League season, Sao was sent to the sin bin during the clubs 22-0 loss to arch-rivals Hull Kingston Rovers. Sao was limited to just two games for Hull F.C. in the 2025 Super League season as the club finished 7th on the table. On 28 August 2026, it was announced that Sao would leaving Hull F.C. at the end of the 2026 Super League season.

=== Bradford Bulls ===
On 2 September 2026 it was reported that he had signed for Bradford Bulls in the Super League on a 1-year deal.

== International career ==
In October 2022, Sao was named in the Samoa squad for the 2021 Rugby League World Cup.

== Statistics ==
Year	Team	Games	Tries	Pts
2013	Manly Warringah Sea Eagles	1		
2015	Manly Warringah Sea Eagles	20	2	8
2016	New Zealand Warriors	2		
2017	New Zealand Warriors	11		
2018	New Zealand Warriors	5		
2019	New Zealand Warriors	8	1	4
2020	Hull FC	18	1	4
2021	Hull FC	22	1	4
2022	Hull FC	23		
2023	Hull FC	18	1	4
2024	Hull FC	22	1	4
2025	Hull FC	2		
2026	Hull FC	7	1	4
2027	Bradford Bulls			
	Totals	158	8	32
