= Adam Swift (rugby league) =

English professional rugby league footballer

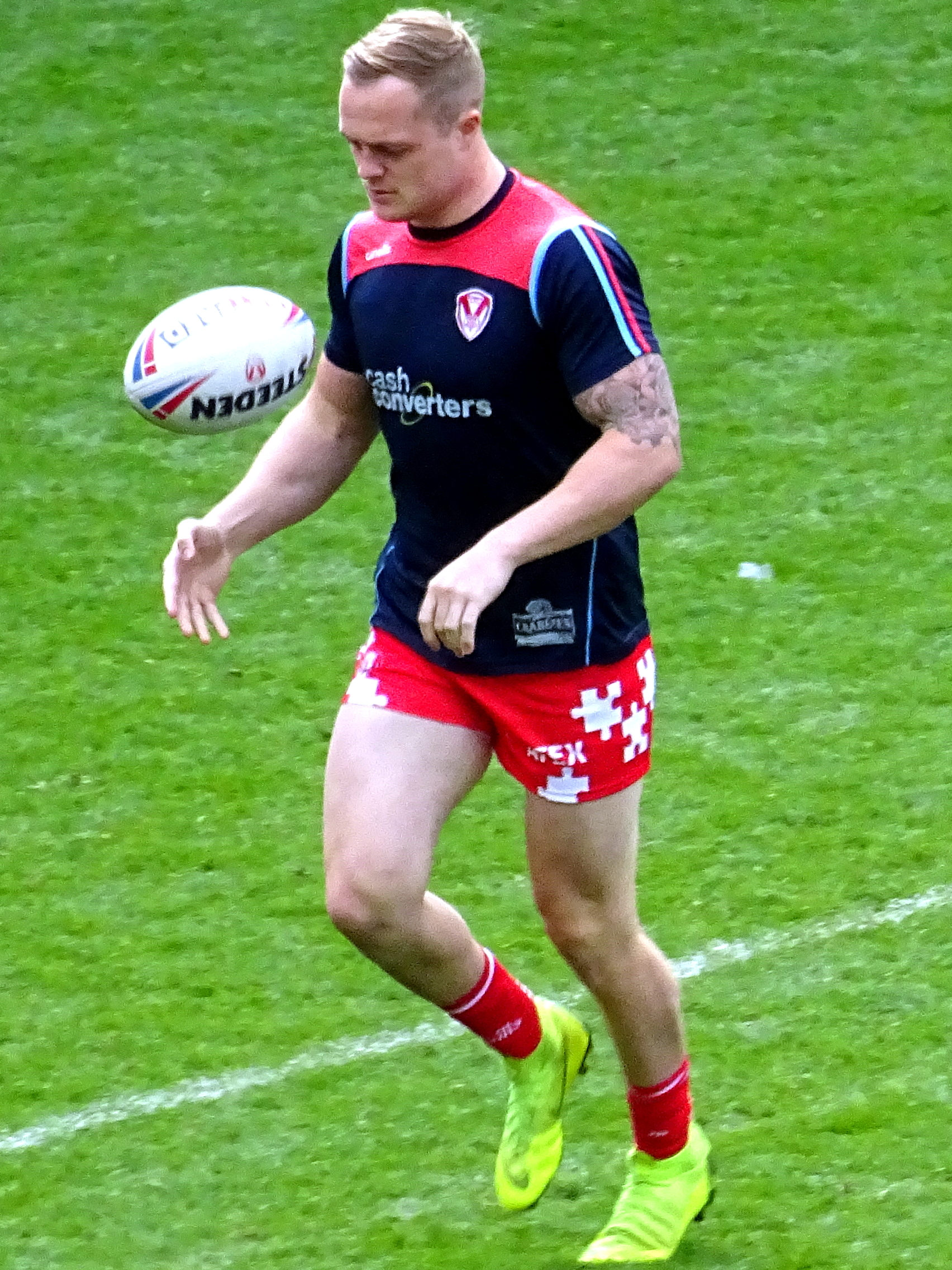

Personal information
- Born: 20 February 1993 (age 33) St Helens, Merseyside, England
- Height: 6 ft 0 in (1.83 m)
- Weight: 13 st 12 lb (88 kg)

Playing information
- Position: Wing
Club
Years	Team	Pld	T	G	FG	P
2012–19	St Helens	130	86	0	0	344
2013(loan)	→ Whitehaven	5	3	0	0	12
2013(loan)	→ Rochdale Hornets	2	2	0	0	8
2014(loan)	→ Rochdale Hornets	3	3	0	0	12
2018(loan)	→ Sheffield Eagles	4	3	0	0	12
2019(loan)	→ Leigh Centurions	1	2	0	0	8
2020–23	Hull F.C.	55	36	0	0	144
2024–	Huddersfield Giants	30	27	0	0	108
	Total	230	162	0	0	648
- Source: As of 2 October 2025

Adam Swift (born 20 February 1993) is an English professional rugby league footballer who plays as a winger for the Huddersfield Giants in the Super League.

He has played for St Helens in the Super League, and spent time on loan from the Saints at Whitehaven in the Championship, and the Rochdale Hornets in Championship 1 and the Championship. Swift has also spent time away from St Helens on loan at the Sheffield Eagles and the Leigh Centurions in the Betfred Championship. He won the 2014 Super League Grand Final with his hometown club St Helens.

== Background ==
Swift was born and has lived in St Helens, Merseyside, England all his life. In his secondary education, he attended Cowley International College.

== Career ==
=== St Helens ===
Swift made his St Helens Super League début in 2012.

His number was 26 but for the 2014 season, he wore the number 5 as first choice winger.

Swift made some appearances for Whitehaven as fullback on dual registration from St Helens.

St Helens reached the 2014 Super League Grand Final, and Swift was selected to play on the wing in their 14–6 victory over the Wigan Warriors at Old Trafford.

=== Hull FC ===
In round 9 of the 2021 Super League season, Swift scored two tries for Hull F.C. in a 30–12 victory over Castleford. The following week, he scored another two tries as Hull F.C. defeated Leigh 64–22. Swift played a total of 24 games for Hull F.C. for in the Super League XXVIII season and scored 19 tries as the club finished 10th on the table.

=== Huddersfield ===
On 24 September 2023 it was announced that Swift had signed with Huddersfield for the 2024 season on a three-year deal. In round 1 of the 2024 Super League season, Swift made his club debut for Huddersfield in their 16-8 victory over Leigh. In round 4, Swift scored two tries for Huddersfield in their 50-8 win against Castleford. In round 7, Swift scored a hat-trick in the clubs 56-22 victory over Hull F.C. Swift played 17 games for Huddersfield in the 2025 Super League season as the club finished 10th on the table.
