= Masimbaashe Matongo =

Zimbabwean rugby league footballer (born 1996)

Masi Matongo
Personal information
- Full name: Masimbaashe Matongo
- Born: 15 May 1996 (age 29) Harare, Zimbabwe
- Height: 6 ft 1 in (1.86 m)
- Weight: 16 st 10 lb (106 kg)

Playing information
- Position: Prop
Club
Years	Team	Pld	T	G	FG	P
2015–21	Hull F.C.	59	3	0	0	12
2021(loan)	→Bradford Bulls	1	0	0	0	0
2022	York City Knights	19	1	0	0	4
2023	Bradford Bulls	5	1	0	0	4
2025–	Sheffield Eagles	0	0	0	0	0
	Total	84	5	0	0	20
- Source: As of 24 November 2024

Masimbaashe "Masi" Matongo (born 15 May 1996) is a Zimbabwean professional rugby league footballer who plays as a prop forward for the Sheffield Eagles in the RFL Championship.

== Background ==
Matongo was born in Harare, Zimbabwe.

== Career ==
=== Hull FC ===
Matongo made his Hull F.C. début on 11 September 2015 in a Super League Super 8s away match against Wigan Warriors at the DW Stadium.

=== Bradford Bulls (loan) ===
In August 2021 he joined Bradford Bulls on loan until the end of the season.

=== York RLFC ===
On 22 October 2021, it was reported that he had signed for York RLFC in the RFL Championship

=== Sheffield Eagles ===
On 22 November 2024, it was reported that he had signed for Sheffield in the RFL Championship on a one-year deal.

== International career ==
In July 2018 he was selected in the England Knights Performance squad.
