= Joe Cator =

English professional rugby league footballer

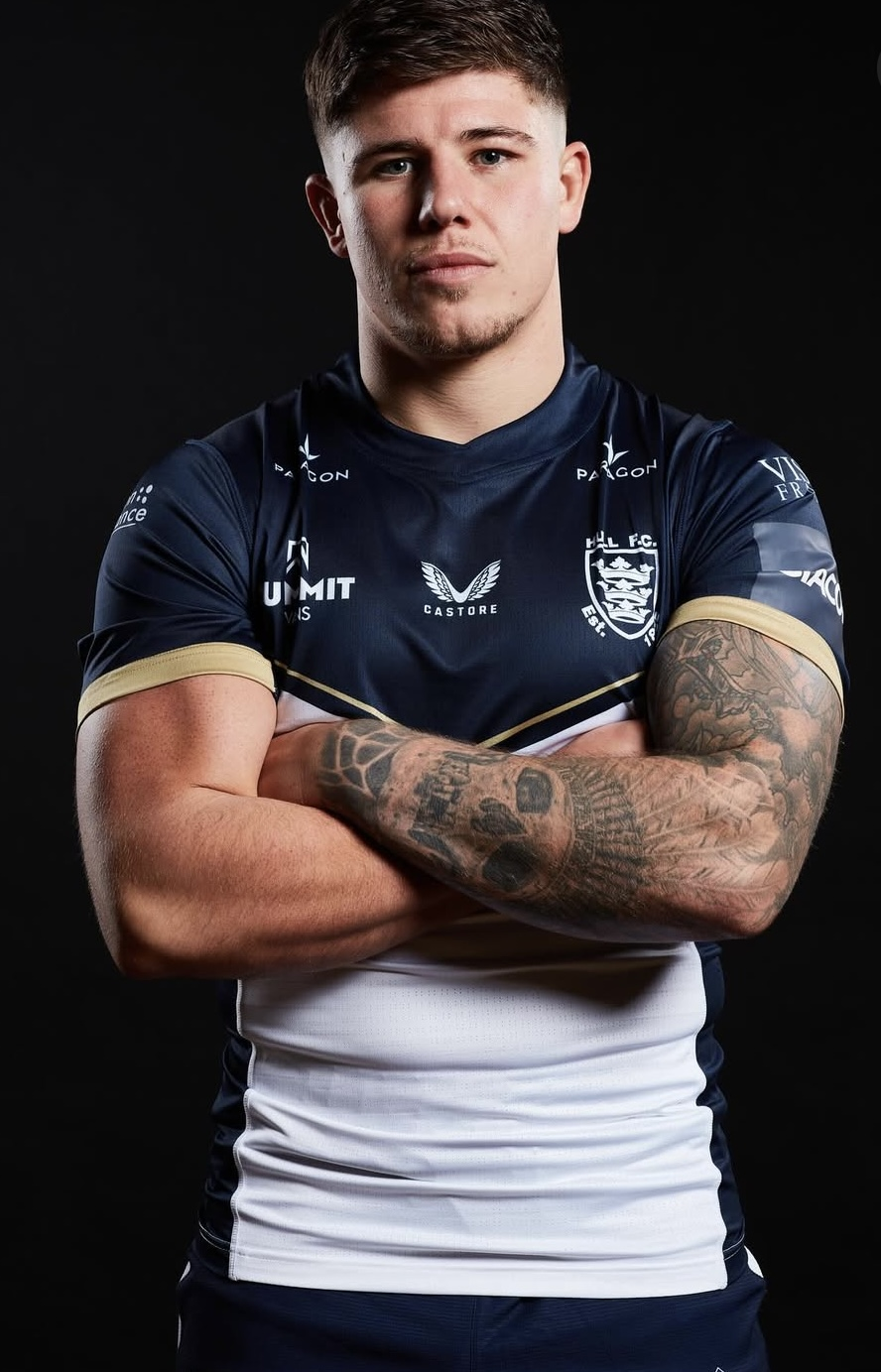

Personal information
- Full name: Joseph Cator
- Born: 15 June 1998 (age 28) Hull, East Riding of Yorkshire, England
- Height: 5 ft 11 in (1.80 m)
- Weight: 13 st 1 lb (83 kg)

Playing information
- Position: Loose forward
Club
Years	Team	Pld	T	G	FG	P
2016–18	Hull Kingston Rovers	17	12	0	0	48
2018(loan)	→ Coventry Bears	2	1	0	0	4
2018(loan)	→ Newcastle Thunder	5	0	0	0	0
2019	Leigh Centurions	33	5	0	0	20
2020–24	Hull F.C.	60	1	0	0	4
2020(loan)	→ Bradford Bulls	1	1	0	0	4
2024–	Toulouse Olympique	49	2	0	0	8
	Total	167	22	0	0	88
- Source: As of 13 October 2026

Joe Cator (born 15 June 1998) is an English professional rugby league footballer who plays as a loose forward for Toulouse Olympique in the Betfred Super League.

He played for Hull Kingston Rovers in the Championship and the Super League, and on loan from Hull KR at the Coventry Bears and the Newcastle Thunder in League 1. Cator also played for the Leigh Centurions in the Championship.

== Background ==
Cator was born in Kingston Upon Hull, East Riding of Yorkshire, England.

== Playing career ==
=== Hull KR ===
Cator began his career with Hull Kingston Rovers and was part of the side which was promoted back to the Super League. He then spent time on loan at Leigh before signing for his boyhood club Hull F.C.

=== Hull F.C. ===
Cator played 11 games for Hull F.C. in the 2020 Super League season including the club's semi-final defeat against Wigan. Cator had a loan spell with Bradford during the early stages of 2020. When he returned to Hull, he became one of the standout performers and went on to win the club's Young Player of the Year award at the end of the season. Cator played 26 matches for Hull F.C. in the Super League XXVIII season as the club finished 10th on the table.

=== Toulouse Olympique ===
On 26 October 2024, it was confirmed that he had agreed a deal with Toulouse Olympique ahead of the 2025 season.
