= Manu Maʻu =

New Zealand and Tonga international rugby league footballer

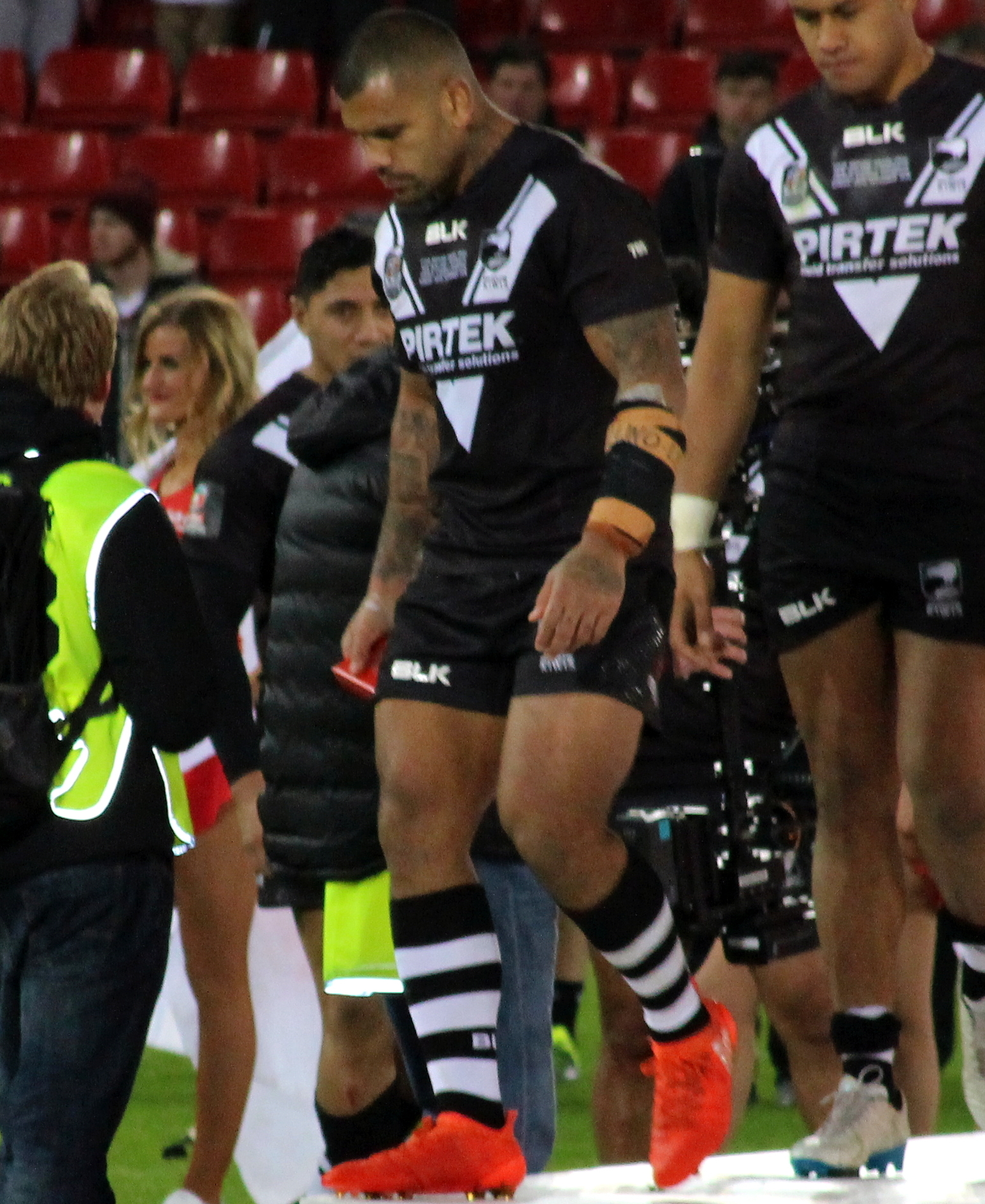

Personal information
- Full name: Sonatane Manu Maʻu
- Born: 24 August 1988 (age 38) Auckland, New Zealand
- Height: 6 ft 0 in (1.84 m)
- Weight: 16 st 3 lb (103 kg)

Playing information
- Position: Second-row
Club
Years	Team	Pld	T	G	FG	P
2014–19	Parramatta Eels	115	15	1	0	62
2020–22	Hull F.C.	47	6	0	0	24
2023–24	Catalans Dragons	20	3	0	0	8
	Total	182	24	1	0	94
Representative
Years	Team	Pld	T	G	FG	P
2015–19	Tonga	11	1	0	0	4
2016	New Zealand	6	0	0	0	0
- Source: As of 11 November 2024

Manu Maʻu (born 24 August 1988) is a rugby league footballer who plays as a second-row forward for the Souths Sharks in Mackay, Queensland. He has played for both Tonga and New Zealand at international level.

He previously played for the Parramatta Eels in the NRL and Hull FC in the Super League.

== Background ==
Ma'u was born in Auckland, New Zealand, and is of Tongan descent. He attended rugby league nursery St Paul's College, Auckland.

He played his junior football for the Richmond Rovers and Marist Saints.

== Early years ==
Ma'u was an original member of Auckland's Roskill South-based "JDK", one of the many street gangs in New Zealand. In 2007, after one of the gang was stabbed during an altercation, the gang gatecrashed a 21st birthday party in an alcohol-fuelled quest for vengeance, found the alleged perpetrators and "unleashed hell". Two months later, Maʻu was arrested along with his brother, Semisi. He was convicted of grievous bodily harm with intent to injure and served 22 months in prison.

Ma'u was released in 2009 to work and continue his rugby league career, and joined the New Zealand Warriors' reserves team the Auckland Vulcans in the New South Wales Cup. But he found himself unable to play away games, as the Australian immigration department denied him a visa, citing his criminal history.

In 2013, after his manager and the Parramatta Eels battled for a year to gain the necessary visa, Ma'u moved to Australia to play in the New South Wales Cup for the Wentworthville Magpies, the Eels' reserves team.

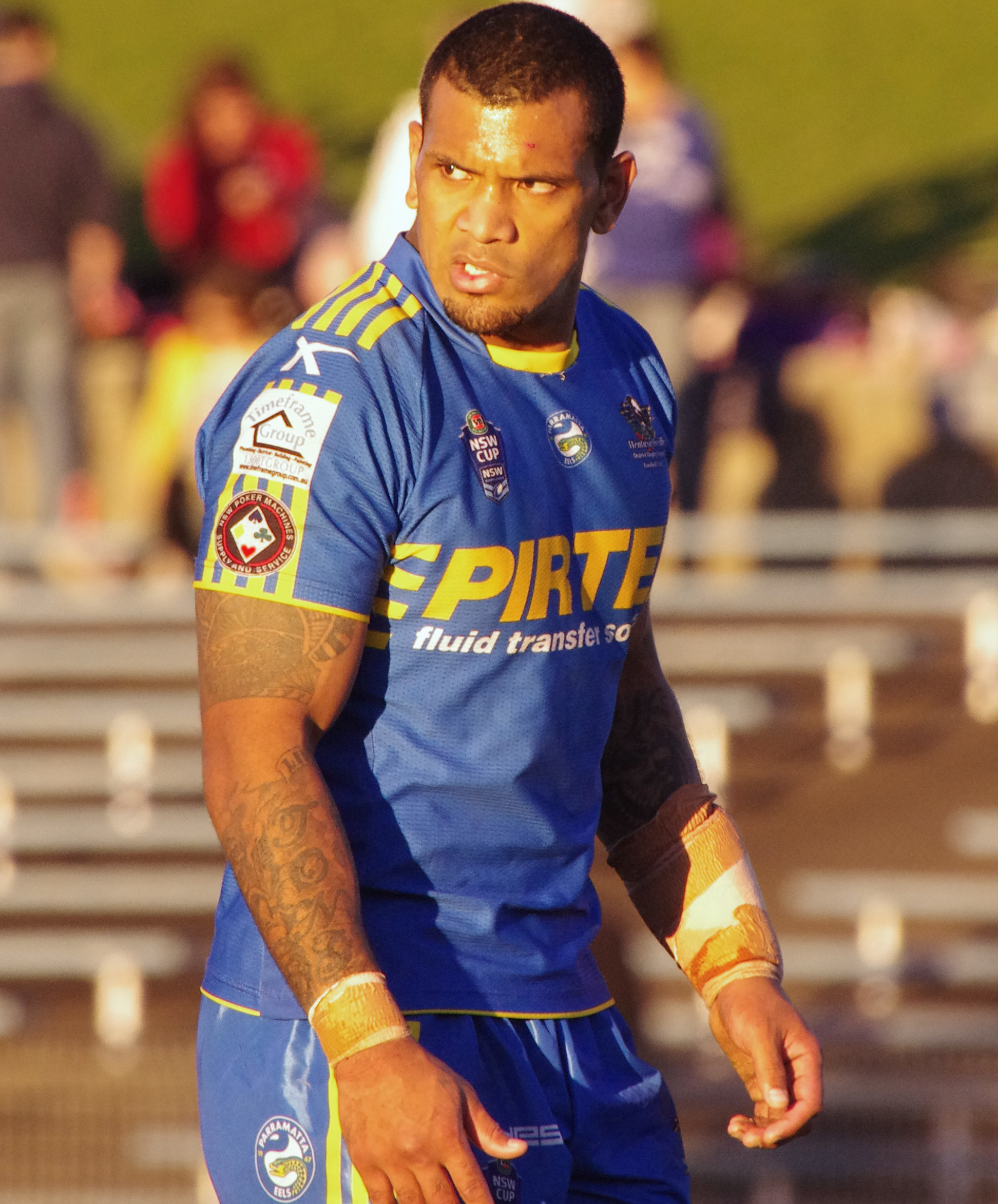
Ma'u playing for Parramatta in 2013

A reformed man with a young family of his own, Ma'u was eager to put his past behind him and make the most of his opportunity with the Eels. Ma'u said "I want to repay Parramatta for their faith," "I want to build a future. I want my partner Alisi and my kids [Melino and Levi] to be proud of me and I want my family to realise I'm not that naughty boy that caused them pain."

== Playing career ==
=== 2014 ===
In February 2014, Ma'u was included in the Eels inaugural 2014 Auckland Nines squad. In Round 1 of the 2014 NRL season, Ma'u made his NRL debut for the Parramatta Eels against the New Zealand Warriors at second-row. Ma’u won the Man of the Match award on debut in Parramatta's 36-16 win at Parramatta Stadium. In Round 4 against the Penrith Panthers, Ma’u scored his first NRL career try in the 32-16 win at Parramatta Stadium. On 5 June 2014, Ma’u extended his contract with the Parramatta club for a further three years to the end of the 2017 season. In Round 14 against the Canterbury-Bankstown Bulldogs at ANZ Stadium, Ma’u debut year in the NRL was over after suffering a fractured forearm in the Parramatta's 22-12 win. Ma’u finished off his debut year in the NRL with him playing in 13 matches and scoring a try for the Parramatta side in the 2014 NRL season.

=== 2015 ===
On 31 January and 1 February, Ma'u played for the Eels in the 2015 NRL Auckland Nines. On 2 May, Ma'u represented Tonga in their 2015 Polynesian Cup test-match against Pacific rivals Samoa, playing at second-row in Tonga's 18-16 loss at Cbus Super Stadium. He finished off the 2015 season having played in 22 matches and scoring 5 tries for Parramatta club. On 8 September, he was named in the New Zealand train-on squad, however didn't make the final squad so played for Tonga in their Asia-Pacific Qualifier match against the Cook Islands for the 2017 Rugby League World Cup, playing at second-row in Tonga's 28-8 win at Campbelltown Stadium.

=== 2016 ===
On 1 February 2016, Ma'u was named in the Eels' 2016 NRL Auckland Nines squad. On 6 May 2016, Ma'u made his debut for New Zealand against Australia in the 2016 Anzac Test, starting at second-row in the 16-0 loss at Hunter Stadium. On 15 September 2016 at the Parramatta presentation night, Ma’u was awarded with the Ken Thornett Medal as being the club's Players’ Player of the year. Ma’u finished the 2016 NRL season with him playing in 22 matches and scoring two tries for the Parramatta club. On 25 September 2016, Ma’u was rewarded for his solid season with the club by getting his contract extended to the end of the 2019 season. On 4 October 2016, Ma’u was selected in the New Zealand Kiwis 24-man squad for the 2016 Four Nations. Ma’u played in all 5 matches of the tournament including starting at second-row in the Kiwis 34-8 Four Nations Final loss against Australia at Anfield.

=== 2017 ===
In the 2017 season, Ma'u played 24 games for Parramatta as they finished fourth on the table at the end of the season and qualified for the finals which was the club's first appearance since the 2009 season.

Ma'u elected to switch his national allegiance Tonga in 2017.

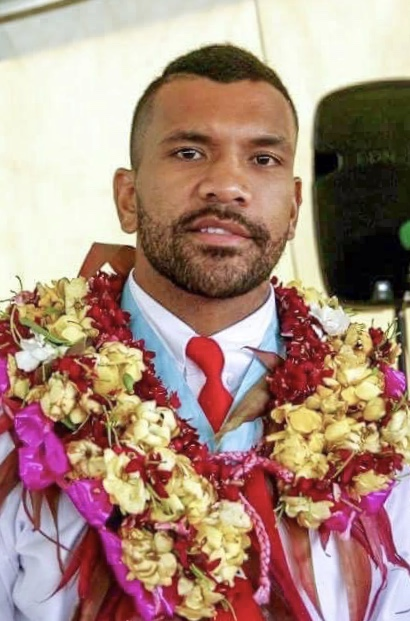
Ma'u representing Tonga in 2017

He was named in the Tonga squad for the 2017 Rugby League World Cup and played in every match of their historic charge to the semi-finals. He scored a try in their victory over arch-rivals Samoa.

=== 2018 ===
On 27 June 2018, Ma'u was ruled out for the rest of the season after suffering a fractured cheekbone in a middle of the season test match while playing for Tonga against Samoa. Even though Parramatta were running last at the time, Ma'u was cited as being one of the better players in the struggling side.

=== 2019 ===
After missing the start of the season through injury, Ma'u made his return for Parramatta in Round 7 against Newcastle scoring a try in a 28-14 loss. On 8 July 2019, it was announced that Ma'u had signed a 2-year deal with Hull F.C. in England starting in the 2020 Super League season.

At the end of the 2019 regular season, Parramatta finished in 5th place on the table and qualified for the finals. In the elimination final against Brisbane, Ma'u kicked a goal in his last home game as Parramatta won the match 58-0 at the new Western Sydney Stadium. The victory was the biggest finals win in history, eclipsing Newtown's 55-7 win over St George in 1944. The match was also Parramatta's biggest win over Brisbane and Brisbane's worst ever loss since entering the competition in 1988.

Ma'u played his final game for Parramatta the following week as the club were defeated 32-0 by Melbourne in the elimination semi final at AAMI Park.

=== 2020 ===
He played 11 games for Hull F.C. in the 2020 Super League season including the semi-final defeat against Wigan.

=== 2021 ===
Ma'u played 20 games for Hull F.C. in the 2021 Super League season in which the club finished 8th on the table and missed out on the playoffs.

=== 2022 ===
On 12 July 2022, Ma'u signed a two-year deal to join the Catalans Dragons starting in 2023. Mau'u played a total of 14 games for Hull F.C. in the 2022 Super League season which saw the club finish 9th on the table.

=== 2023 ===
In round 4 of the 2023 Super League season, Ma'u scored two tries and was also sin binned during Catalans 18-10 victory over Wigan. On 14 October, Ma'u played in Catalans 2023 Super League Grand Final loss against Wigan.

=== 2024 ===
Ma'u would depart Catalans at the end of the season. It was announced on 9 November that Ma'u had returned to Australia and signed with Souths Sharks.

== Statistics ==
Year	Team	Games	Tries	Goals	Pts
2014	Parramatta Eels	13	1		4
2015	Parramatta Eels	22	5		20
2016	Parramatta Eels	22	2		8
2017	Parramatta Eels	24	1		4
2018	Parramatta Eels	14	3		12
2019	Parramatta Eels	20	3	1	14
2020	Hull FC	13	3		12
2021	Hull FC	20	1		4
2022	Hull FC	14	2		8
2023	Catalans Dragons	20	3		12
	Totals	174	33	1	94
