= Jake Connor =

England international rugby league footballer

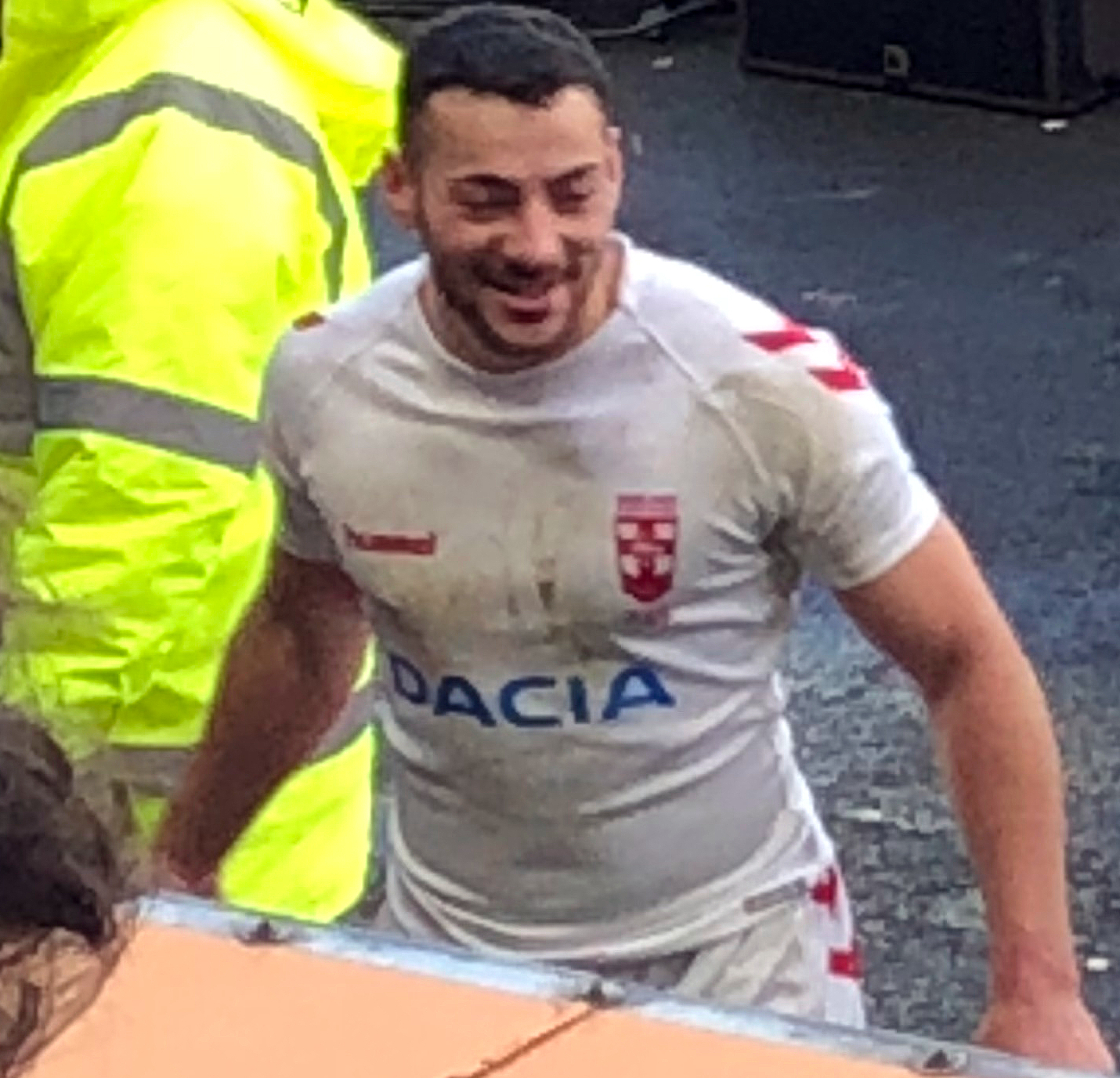

Personal information
- Full name: Jake Dean Connor
- Born: 18 October 1994 (age 32) Halifax, West Yorkshire, England
- Height: 6 ft 0 in (1.83 m)
- Weight: 15 st 6 lb (98 kg)

Playing information
- Position: Centre, Fullback, Stand-off, Scrum-half
Club
Years	Team	Pld	T	G	FG	P
2013–16	Huddersfield Giants	57	24	2	1	101
2014(DR)	→ Batley Bulldogs	1	1	0	0	4
2015(DR)	→ Oldham	2	1	0	0	4
2017–22	Hull F.C.	142	41	124	5	417
2023–24	Huddersfield Giants	42	4	77	2	172
2025–	Leeds Rhinos	38	7	134	1	300
	Total	282	78	337	9	998
Representative
Years	Team	Pld	T	G	FG	P
2018	England	5	4	9	0	34
2019	Great Britain	3	0	0	0	0
2021	Combined Nations All Stars	1	0	0	0	0

Coaching information
Club
Years	Team	Gms	W	D	L	W%
2025–	Siddal A.R.L.F.C.	0	0	0	0
- Source: As of 14 November 2026

Jake Connor (born 18 October 1994) is an English professional rugby league footballer who plays as a stand-off or fullback for the Leeds Rhinos in the Super League, and has played for England and Great Britain at international level. He has also played as a centre and scrum-half in his career. Connor is also the head coach of amateur side Siddal A.R.L.F.C. of the National Conference League.

He started his career at Huddersfield Giants after coming through their Academy, spending time on loan at Batley in the Championship and Oldham in League 1. He signed for Hull F.C. in 2017 and returned to Huddersfield for the 2023 season. After moving to Leeds Rhinos in 2025 he was named the 2025 Steve Prescott MBE Man of Steel.

== Background ==
Connor was born in Halifax, West Yorkshire, England. His paternal grandfather is from Trinidad.

== Career ==
=== Hull F.C. ===
Connor signed for Hull F.C. for the 2017 season.

He played in the 2017 Challenge Cup Final victory over Wigan at Wembley Stadium.

Connor played 16 games for Hull F.C. in the 2020 Super League season including the club's semi-final defeat against Wigan.

Connor played 18 games for Hull F.C. in the 2021 Super League season where they missed the playoffs finishing 8th on the table. In round 1 of the 2022 Super League season, Connor was sent off in Hull FC's victory over Wakefield Trinity.

It was announced that Connor was returning to Huddersfield in October 2022.

=== Return to Huddersfield ===
In round 6 of the 2023 Super League season, Connor made his second club debut for Huddersfield in their 14-12 loss against St Helens R.F.C. Connor played 21 games in the 2023 Super League season as Huddersfield finished ninth on the table and missed the playoffs. Connor played 18 matches for Huddersfield in the 2024 Super League season as the club once again finished 9th on the table.

=== Leeds Rhinos ===
On 9 October 2024, it was reported that he had signed for Leeds on a two-year deal. In 2025 he was named the Steve Prescott MBE Man of Steel.

== Statistics ==
Year	Team	Games	Tries	Goals	Assists	Pts
2025	Leeds	26	7	76	30	184
2026	Leeds	24	4	129	42	274
Total	Leeds	50	11	223	72	498

== International career ==
Connor made his England debut against New Zealand at Mile High Stadium in Denver in 2018 and scored on his debut.

Connor was named at scrum-half for England's post-season friendly against France at the Leigh Sports Village on 17 October 2018.

He was selected in England 9s squad for the 2019 Rugby League World Cup 9s.

He was selected in the squad for the 2019 Great Britain Lions tour of the Southern Hemisphere.

On 25 June 2021 he played for the Combined Nations All Stars in their 26-24 victory over England, at the Halliwell Jones Stadium, Warrington, as part of England’s 2021 Rugby League World Cup preparation.

On 13 October 2025, after winning the Man of Steel award, Connor was not picked to be in the England squad for the Ashes series against Australia.

== Coaching ==
Alongside his playing role at Leeds Rhinos, late in 2025, Connor took over the head coach role of National Conference League amateur side Siddal A.R.L.F.C.
