= Andre Savelio =

NZ rugby league footballer (born 1995)

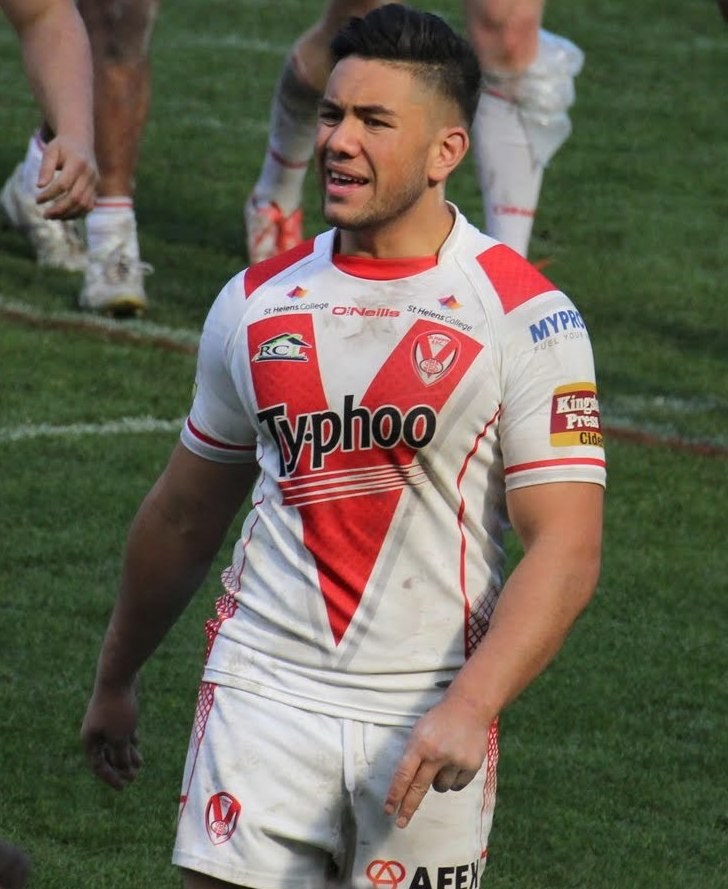

Personal information
- Born: 21 March 1995 (age 31) Lower Hutt, New Zealand
- Height: 6 ft 2 in (1.88 m)
- Weight: 17 st 5 lb (110 kg)

Playing information
- Position: Second-row, Prop
Club
Years	Team	Pld	T	G	FG	P
2014–16	St Helens	42	3	0	0	12
2016(loan)	→ Castleford Tigers	7	1	0	0	4
2017	Warrington Wolves	26	9	0	0	36
2017(loan)	→ Rochdale Hornets	2	0	0	0	0
2018–19	Brisbane Broncos	0	0	0	0	0
2019–23	Hull F.C.	64	18	0	0	72
2024	Huddersfield Giants	9	0	0	0	0
2025–26	Doncaster	2	0	0	0	0
2025(loan)	→ Goole Vikings	5	0	0	0	0
2026(loan)	→ Goole Vikings	5	0	0	0	0
	Total	162	31	0	0	124
Representative
Years	Team	Pld	T	G	FG	P
2021	Combined Nations All Stars	1	0	0	0	0
- Source: As of 20 November 2026

Andre Savelio (born 21 March 1995) is a rugby league footballer who last played for Doncaster RLFC in the RFL Championship.

He previously played for St Helens, on loan from the Saints at the Castleford Tigers in the Super League. He played for the Warrington Wolves, and on loan from the Super League side at the Rochdale Hornets in the Championship. He spent the 2018 and part of 2019 NRL season at the Brisbane Broncos, but did not feature in the National Rugby League (NRL) due to serious injury.

== Early life ==
Savelio was born in Lower Hutt, New Zealand, and raised in Warrington, England, having moved there as a one-year-old when his father, Samoa international Lokeni Savelio, started playing in the Super League.

Savelio attended Cardinal Newman Catholic High School, and played his amateur rugby league for Latchford Albion before being signed by St. Helens at the age of 14. He represented England at an under-16 and under-18 level.

== Playing career ==
=== St Helens ===
Savelio made his first team début for St Helens in March 2014 against Leeds.

=== Warrington Wolves ===
After the conclusion of the 2016 season, Savelio joined Warrington on a one-year deal.

In July 2017, he signed a two-year deal to play for the Brisbane Broncos. During a pre-season trial, Savelio suffered a season-ending injury.

=== Hull FC ===
He later joined Super League side Hull F.C. in 2019. He played 12 games for Hull F.C. in the 2020 Super League season including the club's semi-final defeat against Wigan.

In April 2021, Savelio accused Wigan Warriors forward Tony Clubb of racial abuse during a match between the two sides. An investigation found Clubb guilty of a Grade F offence for using 'unacceptable language based on national or ethnic origin'. As a result, Clubb was suspended for eight matches and fined £500.

In round 10 of the 2021 Super League season, he scored a hat-trick in Hull FC's 64–22 victory over Leigh. In round 15 of the 2021 Super League season, he was sent off after the full-time siren in Hull FC's 40–26 loss against Huddersfield. Savelio played 17 matches for Hull F.C. for in the Super League XXVIII season as the club finished 10th on the table.

=== Huddersfield Giants ===
On 3 October 2023 it was reported that he had signed for Huddersfield on a two-year deal.

It was announced on 25 October 2024 that he had reached a mutual agreement with Huddersfield to be released from his current contract on health grounds.

=== Doncaster RLFC ===
On 5 January 2025 it was reported that he had come out of retirement and signed for Doncaster RLFC in the RFL Championship. He stated that he intended to only play part-time due to focus on his health following concussion issues.

On 21 October 2026 it was announced that he was amongst 6 players released by Doncaster RLFC

=== Goole Vikings (loan) ===
On 21 May 2025 it was reported that he had signed for Goole Vikings in the RFL League 1 on loan

=== Goole Vikings (loan) ===
On 30 January 2026 it was reported that he had rejoined Goole Vikings in the RFL Championship on season-long loan

=== Representative ===
On 25 June 2021 he played for the Combined Nations All Stars in their 26–24 victory over England, staged at the Halliwell Jones Stadium, Warrington, as part of England's 2021 Rugby League World Cup preparation.
