= Chris Satae =

Tongan professional rugby league footballer

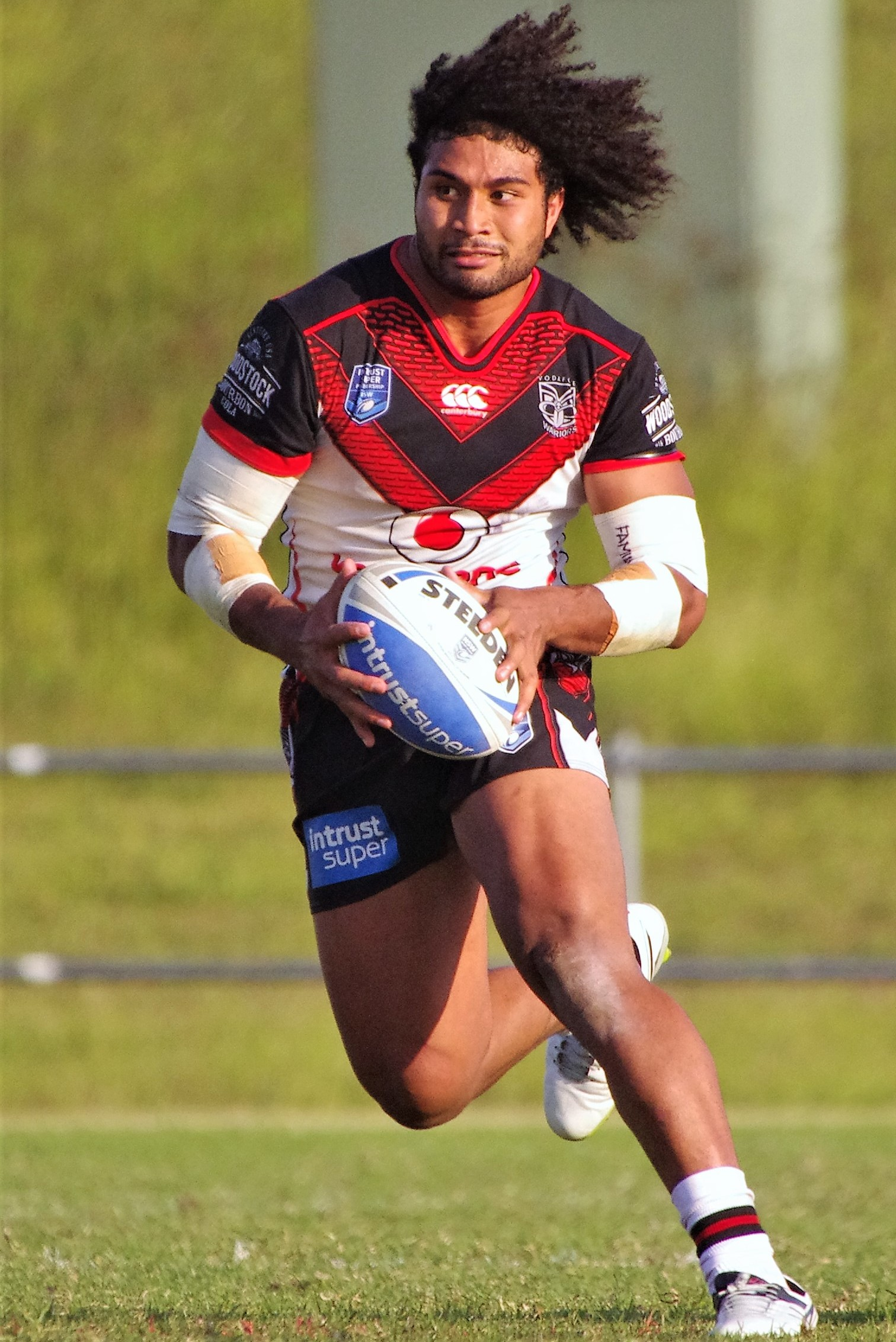

Personal information
- Full name: Tēvita Chris Satae
- Born: 22 October 1992 (age 34) Tofoa, Tonga
- Height: 6 ft 3 in (1.91 m)
- Weight: 18 st 8 lb (118 kg)

Playing information
- Position: Prop, Second-row
Club
Years	Team	Pld	T	G	FG	P
2017–19	New Zealand Warriors	15	0	0	0	0
2019–23	Hull F.C.	97	16	0	0	64
2024–26	Catalans Dragons	74	8	0	0	32
2026–	Saint-Estève XIII Catalan	2	0	0	0	0
	Total	188	24	0	0	96
Representative
Years	Team	Pld	T	G	FG	P
2016	New Zealand Residents		0	0	0	0
2021–22	Combined Nations All Stars	2	0	0	0	0
- Source: As of 24 February 2026

Tēvita Chris Satae (Tongan: Tēvita Kulisi Satae) (born 22 October 1992), anglicised David Chris Satae is a Tongan rugby league footballer who plays as a prop or second-row forward for Saint-Estève XIII Catalan in the Super XIII.

Satae played for the New Zealand Warriors in the National Rugby League. He has previously played for Hull F.C. and Catalans Dragons in the Super League.

== Background ==
Satae was born in Tofoa, Tonga.

== Early career ==
After playing rugby league at St Paul's College, Satae signed with the Penrith Panthers and played in their 2012 National Youth Competition side. Satae also played rugby union for the Ponsonby Rugby Club.

Satae played in the Auckland Rugby League competition for the Glenora Bears and the Point Chevalier Pirates. He represented the Akarana Falcons and the New Zealand Residents in 2016.

== Playing career ==
=== New Zealand Warriors ===
He then signed with the New Zealand Warriors and played in their 2017 Intrust Super Premiership NSW side. On 31 March 2017 his contract was upgraded to a NRL squad contract.

Later that year, In Round 20 of the 2017 NRL season, Satae made his NRL debut for the New Zealand Warriors against the North Queensland Cowboys.

=== Hull F.C. ===
On 5 August 2019, it was announced that Satae was granted a release effective immediately from the remainder of his contract, to take up a contract in Super League with Hull F.C. Satae played 16 games for Hull F.C. in the 2020 Super League season including the club's semi-final defeat against Wigan. In the 2021 Super League season, Satae played 21 games which saw Hull F.C. finish 8th on the table. Satae played nearly every game for Hull F.C. in the 2022 Super League season which saw the club finish 9th and miss the playoffs. On 31 May 2023, Satae signed a two-year deal to join Catalans starting in 2024. Satae played 26 matches for Hull F.C. for in the Super League XXVIII season as the club finished 10th on the table.

=== Catalans Dragons ===
Satae made his club debut for Catalans in round 1 of the 2024 Super League season against Warrington.

=== Representative ===
On 25 June 2021 he was selected for the Combined Nations All Stars for their match against England, staged at the Halliwell Jones Stadium, Warrington, as part of England's 2021 Rugby League World Cup preparation.
