= Jordan Johnstone =

English rugby league footballer

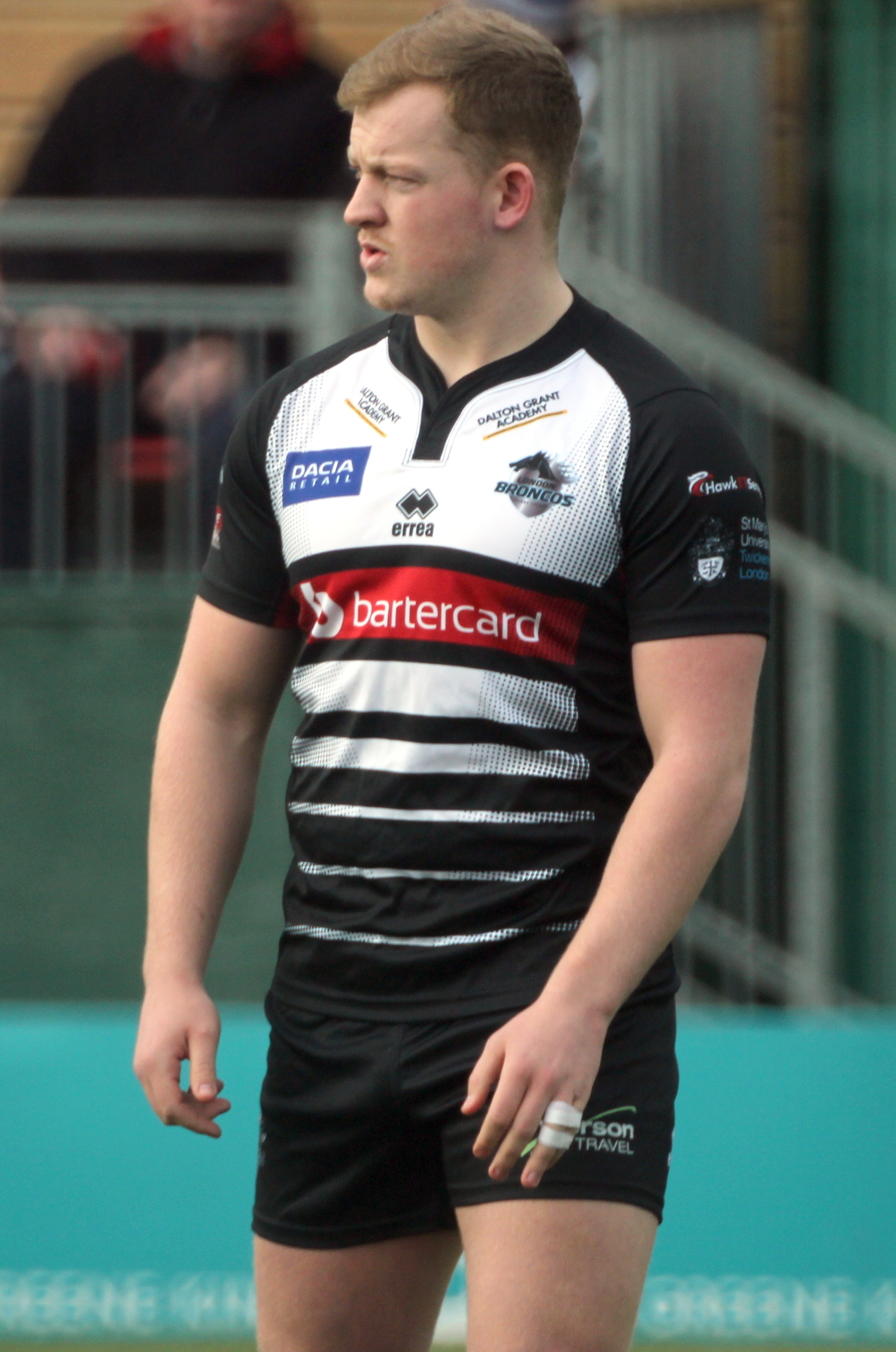

Personal information
- Full name: Jordan Johnstone
- Born: 24 May 1997 (age 27); Whitehaven, Cumbria, England
- Height: 5 ft 9 in (1.75 m)
- Weight: 13 st 7 lb (86 kg)

Playing information
- Position: Hooker, Scrum-half
Club
Years	Team	Pld	T	G	FG	P
2015	Whitehaven	2	1	3	0	10
2016–19	Widnes Vikings	66	5	0	0	20
2018(loan)	→ London Broncos	3	1	0	0	4
2020–22	Hull F.C.	56	3	0	0	12
2023–	Widnes Vikings	41	2	0	0	8
2023(loan)	→ Castleford Tigers	8	0	0	0	0
	Total	176	12	3	0	54
- Source: As of 29 November 2024

Jordan Johnstone (born 24 May 1997) is an English professional rugby league footballer who plays as a hooker for Widnes Vikings in the Championship.

Johnstone previously played for Whitehaven in the Championship, the Widnes Vikings in the Super League and on loan from Widnes at the London Broncos in the Championship.

== Background ==
Johnstone was born in Whitehaven, Cumbria, England.

== Playing career ==
=== Whitehaven ===
He was in the Cumbria Regional Academy system and played his junior rugby league for the Kells club.

He made his début for Whitehaven in the Championship in 2015.

=== Widnes Vikings ===
At the end of 2015 he moved to the Widnes Vikings, making his début in 2016 against the Catalans Dragons.

In 2018 Johnstone joined the London Broncos on loan, and made his Broncos debut in the victory over the Dewsbury Rams in Round 2 of the Championship.

=== Hull F.C. ===
Johnstone signed for Hull F.C. for the 2020 season.

=== Widnes Vikings (rejoin) ===
In September 2022 it was announced that he had re-joined Widnes on a two-year deal.

=== Castleford Tigers (loan) ===
On 4 July 2023, it was announced that he had joined Castleford on loan until the end of the 2023 season as cover for the injured Paul McShane.
