= Townsend (name) =

- Pronunciation: /ˈtaʊnzənd/
- Language: English

Origin
- Meaning: town's end
- Region of origin: Yorkshire, Norfolk

Other names
- Variant forms: Townshend, Townend, Thounhende, Tonsend, Touunend, Tounende, Touunsende, Towneend, Townsende, Townesende, Townson, Townesend, Tunsend.

Townsend is a topographic surname of Yorkshire and Norfolk origin, indicating residence at the extremity of a city or burgh (from Middle English touun "village", "hamlet", "stead" + ende "end"). Popular variants are Townshend (of Norfolk variety), and Townend.

== Given name ==
- Townsend Bell (born 1975), motor racing driver
- Townsend Coleman (born 1954), American voice actor
- Townsend Cromwell (1922–1958), oceanographer
- Townsend Dodd (1886–1919), US Army aviator
- Townsend A. Ely (1843–1928), American politician from Michigan
- Townsend Haines (1792–1865), American politician and judge from Pennsylvania
- Townsend Harris (1804–1878), 19th century American merchant and politician
- Townsend Hoopes (1922–2004), former Undersecretary of the US Air Force
- Townsend Saunders (born 1967), Olympic medalist in wrestling
- Townsend Scudder (1865–1960), US Congressman from New York
- Townsend Whelen (1877–1961), American hunter, soldier, writer, outdoorsman and rifleman

== Middle name ==
- Charles Townsend Ludington (1896–1968), American aviator
- Cyrus Townsend Brady (1861–1920), American journalist
- Frederick Townsend Martin (1849–1914), American author
- Frederick Townsend Ward (1831–1862), American mercenary
- James Townsend Saward, English barrister and forger
- John Townsend Trowbridge (1827–1916), American author
- Light Townsend Cummins (born 1946), American educator and historian
- Lynn Townsend White, Jr. (1907–1987), American professor
- Mary Townsend Seymour (1873–1957), African-American politician
- Sylvia Townsend Warner (1893–1978), English novelist and poet
- Thomas Townsend Brown (1905–1985), American inventor

== Surname ==
=== Townsend ===
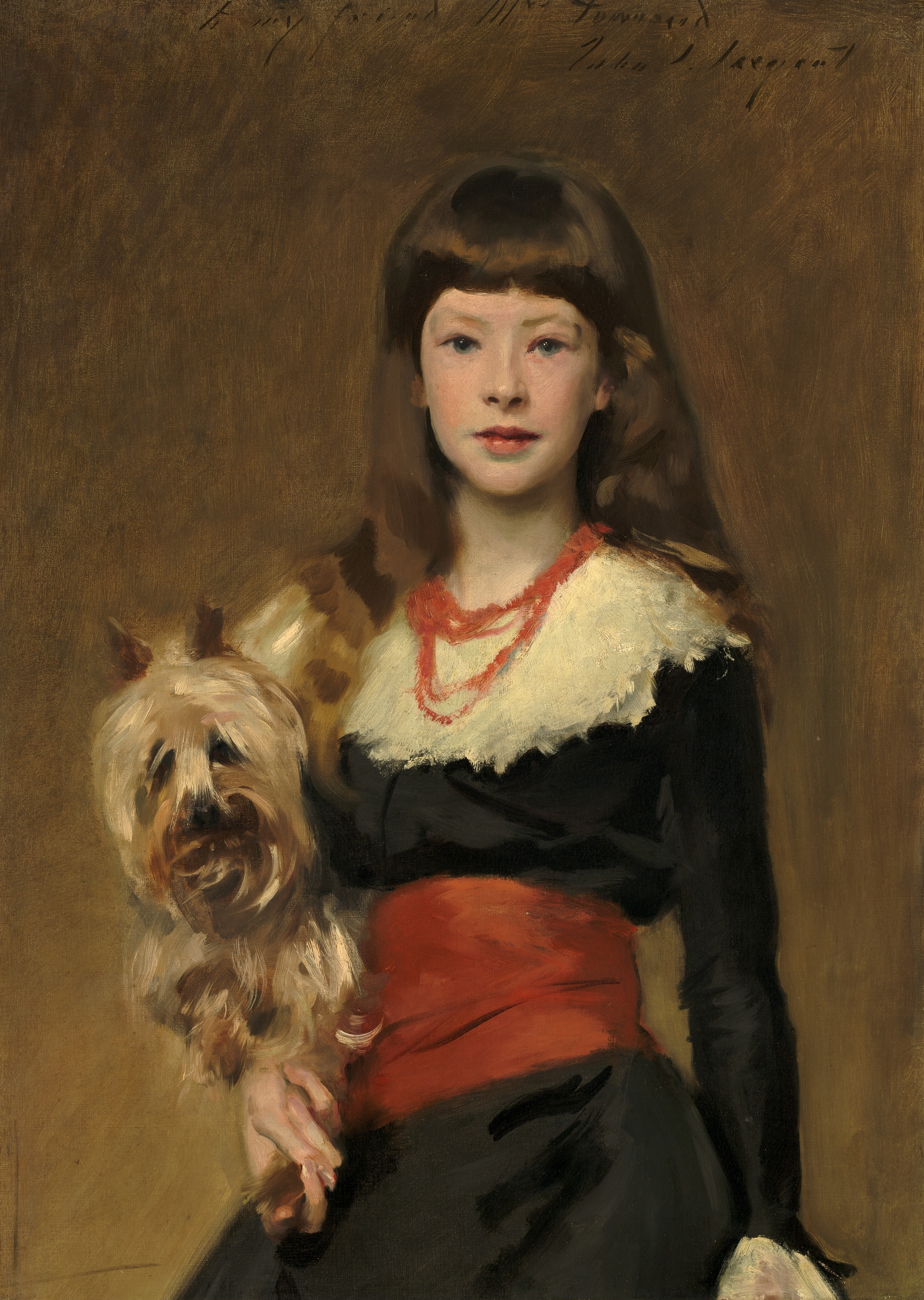
Miss Beatrice Townsend by John Singer Sargent, oil on canvas, 1882

- A. A. Townsend (1810–1888), American pioneer and politician
- Albert Alan Townsend (1917–2010), Australian fluid dynamicist
- Alf Townsend (1900–1973), rugby league footballer of the 1920s for New Zealand
- Amos Townsend (1821–1895), American politician
- Andros Townsend (born 1991), English football player
- Andy Townsend (born 1963), Irish soccer player
- Anna Townsend (1845–1923), American silent film actress
- Anel Townsend (born 1966), Peruvian politician
- Ben Townsend (born 1981), English football player
- Bertha Townsend (1869–1909), American tennis player
- Bill Townsend, American entrepreneur
- Bill Townsend (footballer) (1922–1988), English football player and manager
- Boris Townsend (1919–2006), English physicist
- Brian Townsend (poker player), American poker player
- Bruce C. Townsend, American politician
- Cade Townsend (born 2005), American baseball player
- Camilla Townsend (born 1965), American historian
- Cathy Townsend (born 1937), Canadian ten-pin bowler
- Charles Townsend (disambiguation) (multiple, includes "Charlie")
- Chauncy Townsend (1708–1770), British politician
- Chuck Townsend, American politician
- Chris Townsend (disambiguation)
- Clinton Paul Townsend (1868 — 1931), American chemist
- M. Clifford Townsend (1884–1954), former Governor of the U.S. state of Indiana
- Cornelia Townsend (born 11 August 1851, date of death unknown), American composer
- Cyril Townsend, Sir Cyril David Townsend (1937–2013), British politician.
- Dallas Townsend, Dallas S. Townsend, Jr. (1919–1995), American broadcaster
- Darian Townsend (born 1984), South African swimmer
- Dave Townsend (born 1954), contemporary British musician
- David Townsend (disambiguation)
- Deshea Townsend (born 1975), American football player
- Dequan Townsend (born 1986), American mixed martial artist
- Devin Townsend (born 1972), Canadian musician
- Dobbo Townshend (1944–2013), Zimbabwean cricketer
- Douglas Townsend (1921–2012), American composer
- Dwight Townsend (1826–1899), U.S. Representative from New York
- E. Reginald Townsend (1917–1980), American politician and journalist
- Ed Townsend (1929–2003), songwriter
- Eddie Townsend (1914–1988), boxing trainer
- Edward D. Townsend (1817–1893), Adjutant General of the United States Army
- Edgar Jerome Townsend (1864–1955), American mathematician and translator of David Hilbert's Grundlagen der Geometrie.
- Eliza Townsend (1788–1854), American poet
- Elizabeth Sthreshley Townsend (died 1919), American inventor
- Emma Jose Townsend (1869–1965), British recipient of the Empire Gallantry Medal
- Emily Vermeule (1928–2001), née Emily Dickinson Townsend
- Ernest Townsend, British portraitist from Derby (1880–1944)
- F. H. Townsend, British cartoonist and illustrator (1868–1920)
- Fitzhugh Townsend (1872–1906), American fencer
- Frances Townsend (born 1961), former Homeland Security Adviser to U.S. President George W. Bush
- Francis Townsend (1867–1960), creator of the proposal for an old-age pension plan during the Great Depression
- Franklin Townsend (1821–1898), 47th Mayor of Albany, New York, Adjutant General of the State of New York
- Frederick Townsend (1825–1897), Union Army officer in the Civil War, Adjutant General of New York
- Fred Townsend (1862–1918), American politician
- Gareth Townsend (born 1968), English cricketer and cricket coach
- George Alfred Townsend (1841–1914), American journalist and novelist
- George Fyler Townsend (Reverend) (1814–1900), British writer and translator
- Gregor Townsend (born 1973), Scottish rugby player
- Graeme Townsend (born 1954), Australian artist
- Harry Everett Townsend WWI war artist
- Henry Townsend (missionary) (1815–1886), Anglican missionary
- Henry Townsend (musician) (1909–2006), American blues singer, guitarist and pianist
- Henry Townsend (Norwich) (1626–1695), early American colonist born in Norwich, Norfolk, England
- Henry Townsend (Oyster Bay) (1649–1703), American colonist born in Oyster Bay
- Howard Townsend (1823–1867), physician and lecturer in Albany, New York
- James Townsend (disambiguation), several people
- Jill Townsend (born 1945), American actress
- JoAnn Clayton Townsend (1935–2020), American space policy analyst
- John Townsend (author) (born 1952), American psychologist and author
- John Townsend (basketball) (died 2001), American basketball player
- John Townsend (footballer) (born 1943), Australian rules footballer
- John Townsend (mayor) (1783–1854), 37th mayor of Albany, NY
- John Townsend (Norwich) (1608–1668), early American settler in Oyster Bay, Long Island
- John Townsend (Wisconsin politician) (born 1938), American politician
- John Townsend (MP for Greenwich) (1819–1892), British politician and Member of Parliament for Greenwich
- John Townsend (Irish politician) (1737–1810), Irish MP for Dingle, Doneraile and Castlemartyr
- John G. Townsend, Jr. (1871–1964), American businessman and politician, Governor and Senator from Delaware
- John Kirk Townsend (1809–1851), American naturalist
- John Rowe Townsend (1922–2014), British children's author
- John Sealy Townsend (1868–1957), Irish physicist
- John Selby Townsend (1824–1892), American politician
- John W. Townsend Jr. (1924–2011), American aerospace engineer and NASA director
- Johnny Townsend (American football) (born 1995), American football player
- Jon Townsend, a historical YouTuber
- Joseph Townsend (1737–1816), English minister and economist
- Kathleen Kennedy Townsend (born 1951), American politician
- Lady Juliet Townsend (1941–2014), British writer and Lord Lieutenant of Northamptonshire
- Larry Townsend (politician) (1947–2013), American politician
- Lauren Townsend (disambiguation), several people
- Lena Townsend (1911–2004), British politician
- Les Townsend (1914–1986), Australian cricket umpire
- Leslie Townsend (disambiguation)
- Madame Lawrence Townsend (see Natalie Townsend)
- Mansfield Townsend (see Marie Townsend, (1851–1912)
- Marie Townsend (1851–1912) American author and composer, aka Mansfield Townsend
- Mark Lee Townsend, American rock guitarist
- Mary Townsend (artist) (1822–1869), New Zealand artist
- Mary Townsend (entomologist) (1814–1851), American abolitionist and entomologist
- Mary Ashley Townsend (1836–1901), American poet and writer
- Michael Townsend (born 1986), English footballer
- Mike Townsend (born 1952), American football player
- Natalie Townsend (1866–1962), American composer aka Pearl Townsend and Madam Lawrence Townsend)
- Norman Townsend (1924–1984), Australian cricket umpire
- Paul Townsend (born 1951), British physicist
- Pearl Townsend (see Natalie Townsend)
- Peter Townsend (RAF officer) (1914–1995), British air-soldier and royal-family associate
- Peter Townsend (sociologist) (1928–2009), economist and author
- Prescott Townsend (1894–1973), American gay rights activist
- Primi Townsend (born 1951), British actress
- Ralph Townsend (1900–1976), American author and activist
- Randolph Townsend (born 1947), American politician
- Raymond Townsend (born 1955), American basketball player
- Richard Townsend (mathematician) (1821–1884), Irish mathematical physicist
- Richard Townsend (soldier), colonel of Oliver Cromwell's army
- Rick Townsend, American politician
- Robert Townsend (disambiguation), several people
- Ryan Townsend (born 1985), Australian footballer
- Simon Townsend (1945–2025), Australian television presenter
- Solomon Townsend (c. 1746–1811), Revolutionary War era ship captain and ironworker
- Stacy Townsend, fictional character in Doctor Who
- Stephen J. Townsend, United States army officer
- Stuart Townsend (born 1972), Irish actor and director
- Sue Townsend (1946–2014), English writer and humorist
- Tammy Townsend (born 1970), American actress and singer
- Taylor Townsend (disambiguation)
- Thomas Townsend (disambiguation), several people (including Tom and Tommy)
- Trey Townsend (born 2002), American basketball player
- Veronica Townsend, fictional character
- Wade Townsend (born 1983), American baseball pitcher
- Wallace Townsend (1882–1979), American lawyer and politician
- Washington Townsend (1813–1894), American politician
- Willard Saxby Townsend (1895–1957), African-American labour leader
- William Townsend (disambiguation), several people
- William Cameron Townsend (1896–1982), prominent Christian missionary and founder of Wycliffe Bible Translators
- Yulia Townsend (born 1986), Russian-born New Zealand singer

==== Fictional characters ====
- Charlie Townsend, fictional character from Charlie's Angels
- Dr. Leland Townsend, main character from American TV series Evil
- Mia Townsend, main character portrayed by American actress Josie Maran in the 2005 video game Need for Speed: Most Wanted
- Tom Townsend, secret identity of fictional Marvel superhero Captain Flag

=== Townshend ===
- Anne Townshend (1573–1622), English Puritan
- Aurelian Townshend, English poet
- Cenzo Townshend, English music producer
- Charles Townshend (disambiguation)
- The Honorable Charlotte Anne Townshend, English landowner (Melbury House, Dorset) and daughter of the 9th Viscount Galway
- Chauncy Hare Townshend, English poet and collector
- Cliff Townshend, musician (1916–1986)
- Dorothea Petrie Townshend Carew (1895 - 1968), poet, writer and the editor of a literary magazine
- Emma Townshend, writer and musician, daughter of Pete Townshend
- George Townshend (disambiguation)
- Graeme Townshend, retired ice hockey forward
- Henry Townshend (disambiguation)
- John Townshend (disambiguation), several people
- Pete Townshend, guitarist and songwriter of The Who
- Robert "Fuzz" Townshend, British drummer
- Simon Townshend, musician (brother of Pete Townshend)
- Thomas Townshend, 1st Viscount Sydney
- William Townshend (colonial governor)

==== Fictional characters ====
- Henry Townshend, main protagonist of the 2004 video game Silent Hill 4: The Room

=== Townesend ===
- Stephen Townesend (priest), Dean of Exeter, 1583–1588
- Stephen Townesend (surgeon), English surgeon, stage actor, anti-vivisectionist and writer

== Pseudonyms ==
- Mike Townsend, pseudonym of Michael McCrea, a British financial adviser, author and convicted killer

== See also ==
- Townend (surname)
- Tausend (surname)
