= 2026 Hull FC season =

English rugby league team season

Hull F.C. 2026 season
- 2026 Super League season Rank: 11th
- Play-off result: Did not qualify
- Challenge Cup: Round 4
- 2026 record: Wins: 9; draws: 0; losses: 20
- Points scored: For: 488; against: 597

Team information
- Chairmen: Andrew Thirkhill; David Hood
- Head coach: John Cartwright (until Round 9); Andy Last (interim from Round 9)
- Captain: Aidan Sezer
- Stadium: MKM Stadium
- Agg. attendance: 13,119
- High attendance: 18,809; Hull Kingston Rovers, 23 July
- Low attendance: 11,843; Leigh Leopards, 18 July

Top scorers
- Tries: Davy Litten (13)
- Goals: Zak Hardaker (47)
- Points: Zak Hardaker (102)
Home colours	Away colours	Third colours
← 2025	List of seasons	2027 →

The 2026 season was Hull F.C.'s 29th consecutive season playing in England's top division of rugby league. They competed in the 2026 Super League season and the 2026 Challenge Cup.

== Preseason friendlies ==
Date and time	Versus	H/A	Venue	Result	Score	Tries	Goals	Attendance	Report
25 January; 14:00 (Note: Brad Fash's testimonial match)	Huddersfield Giants	H	Brantingham Park	L	16–28	Middlemas (2), Romano, C. Kemp	C. Kemp (0/3), Fash (1/1)		
1 February; 15:00 (Note: Liam Marshall's testimonial match)	Wigan Warriors	A	Brick Community Stadium	L	18–22	Martin (3), Litten	Pryce (1/1), C. Kemp (0/1), L. Kemp (0/2)	4,511	

== Super League ==
From 2026, the Super League expanded to 14 teams, with Toulouse Olympique and York Knights being promoted from the RFL Championship via the IMG Grading system. At a meeting of all twelve Super League teams at the Headingley Rugby Stadium on 28 July 2025 to vote on the expansion proposal, Hull F.C. were one of two teams to vote against expanding the league, with the club stating they were against any expansion of the Super League at any time in the current economic climate.

=== Fixtures ===
Hull F.C.'s Super League 2026 fixtures were released on 27 November 2025:

Date and time	Round	Versus	H/A	Venue	Result	Score	Tries	Goals	Attendance	TV	Pos.	Report
14 February; 17:30	Round 1	Bradford Bulls	H	MKM Stadium	W	27–20	Batchelor, Barron, Litten, Cust	Pryce (4/4 + 1 pen.); Drop-goals: Pryce	16,653	Sky Sports +	5th	
21 February; 20:00	Round 2	Wigan Warriors	A	Brick Community Stadium	L	6–34	Hill	Pryce (1/1)	16,620	Sky Sports +	9th	
27 February; 20:00	Round 3	York Knights	H	MKM Stadium	L	16–17	Litten, Barron, Martin	Hardaker (2/3)	12,716	Sky Sports +	10th	
5 March; 20:00	Round 4	Wakefield Trinity	A	Belle Vue	L	10–14	Martin (2)	Hardaker (1/2)	8,239	Sky One; Sky Sports + Main	11th	
22 March; 15:00	Round 5	Leeds Rhinos	H	MKM Stadium	W	24–16	Arthur, Sao, Litten	Hardaker (3/3 + 3 pen.)	12,871	Sky Sports +	8th	
29 March; 15:00	Round 6	Catalans Dragons	H	MKM Stadium	W	24–20	Romano, Martin, Moy, Lisone	Hardaker (3/4 + 1 pen.)	12,321	Sky Sports +	7th	
3 April; 12:30 (Good Friday)	Round 7 (Rivals Round)	Hull Kingston Rovers (Note: 250th Hull derby fixture)	A	Craven Park	L	6–24	Briscoe	Hardaker (1/1)	12,325	Sky Sports + Main	9th	
16 April; 20:00	Round 8 (Note: Following this fixture, head coach John Cartwright, set to be replaced from 2027 by Steve McNamara, left the club with immediate effect and was replaced by interim coach Andy Last.)	St Helens	H	MKM Stadium	L	14–24	Moy, Bourouh	Hardaker (2/2 + 1 pen.)	12,148	Sky One; Sky Sports + Main	9th	
24 April; 20:00	Round 9	Castleford Tigers	A	Wheldon Road	W	50–10	Litten (2), Arthur, Briscoe, Bailey, Martin, Hardaker, Cust, Aydin	Hardaker (6/10 + 1 pen.)	8,030	Sky Sports +	8th	
3 May; 15:00	Round 10	Toulouse Olympique	H	MKM Stadium	L	4–12	Briscoe	Hardaker (0/1)	12,612	Sky Sports +	9th	
17 May; 15:00	Round 11	Bradford Bulls	A	Odsal Stadium	L	14–16	Batchelor, Litten	Hardaker (1/2 + 2 pen.)	7,815	Sky Sports +	9th	
22 May, 20:00	Round 12	Leigh Leopards	A	Leigh Sports Village	L	6–42	Hardaker	Hardaker (1/1)	8,216	Sky One; Sky Sports + Main	10th	
5 June; 20:00	Round 13	Warrington Wolves	A	Halliwell Jones Stadium	L	4–12	Barron	Hardaker (0/1)	8,815	Sky Sports +	11th	
13 June; 15:00	Round 14	Huddersfield Giants	H	MKM Stadium	W	36–12	O'Neill (2), Moy, Arthur, Bourouh, Barron	Sezer (5/6 + 1 pen.)	12,057	Sky Sports +	9th	
19 June; 20:00	Round 15	Wakefield Trinity	H	MKM Stadium	L	10–36	Briscoe, Litten	Sezer (1/2)	12,161	Sky Sports +	10th	
27 June; 15:00	Round 16	Wigan Warriors	H	MKM Stadium	L	16–20	Martin, Barron, Cartwright	Hardaker (2/3)	12,272	Sky Sports +	10th	
4 July; 15:00	Round 17 (Magic Weekend)	Hull Kingston Rovers	N	Hill Dickinson Stadium	L	12–26	Arthur, Briscoe	Hardaker (1/2 + 1 pen.)	34,539	Sky Sports + Main	10th	
9 July; 20:00	Round 18	York Knights	A	York Community Stadium	L	16–20	Sezer, Briscoe, Batchelor	Hardaker (2/3)	5,359	Sky Sports +	13th	
18 July; 17:30	Round 19	Leigh Leopards	H	MKM Stadium	L	22–32	Barron (2), Cust, Clark	Hardaker (3/4)	11,843	Sky Sports +	13th	
23 July; 20:00	Round 20 (Rivals Round Reversed)	Hull Kingston Rovers	H	MKM Stadium	L	20–34	Batchelor, Litten, Arthur	Hardaker (3/3 + 1 pen.)	18,809	Sky Sports + Main	13th	
30 July; 20:00	Round 21	Huddersfield Giants	A	Kirklees Stadium	L	16–22	Litten (2), Batchelor	Hardaker (2/3)	4,215	Sky Sports +	13th	
6 August; 20:00	Round 22	St Helens	A	BrewDog Stadium	W	32–18	Barron (3), Martin, Cust, Bell	Hardaker (3/6 + 1 pen.)	9,910	Sky Sports Action	12th	
14 August; 20:00	Round 23	Castleford Tigers	H	MKM Stadium	L	14–18	Batchelor, Barron, Martin	Sezer (1/3)	12,030	Sky Sports +	12th	
22 August; 20:00 (BST)	Round 24	Catalans Dragons	A	Stade Gilbert Brutus	W	27–26	Moy, Martin, Hill, Sezer	Sezer (3/4 + 2 pen.); Drop-goals: Arthur	9,521	Sky Sports Action	11th	
29 August; 17:30	Round 25	Warrington Wolves	H	MKM Stadium	L	14–16	O'Neill, Briscoe	Sezer (2/2 + 1 pen.)	12,255	Sky Sports +	11th	
4 September; 18:00 (BST)	Round 26	Toulouse Olympique	A	Stade Ernest Wallon	L	30–44	Martin (2), Sezer (2), Moy	Sezer (5/5)	7,360	Sky Sports +	12th	
11 September; 20:00	Round 27	Leeds Rhinos	A	Headingley Rugby Stadium	W	18–12	Moy, L. Kemp, Clark	L. Kemp (3/3)	16,402	Sky Sports Mix	11th	

=== Table ===
Pos	Team	Pld	W	D	L	PF	PA	PD	Pts	Qualification
1	Wigan Warriors (L)	27	22	0	5	851	439	+412	44	Advance to Semi-finals
2	Leeds Rhinos	27	20	0	7	904	426	+478	40	Advance to Semi-finals
3	Warrington Wolves	27	20	0	7	726	465	+261	40	Advance to Eliminators
4	Wakefield Trinity	27	19	0	8	709	486	+223	38	Advance to Eliminators
5	Leigh Leopards	27	17	0	10	644	497	+147	34	Advance to Eliminators
6	Hull KR	27	16	0	11	748	503	+245	32	Advance to Eliminators
7	St Helens	27	15	0	12	636	614	+22	30	
8	Toulouse Olympique	27	10	0	17	578	704	−126	20	
9	Catalans Dragons	27	10	0	17	537	802	−265	20	
10	York Knights	27	9	0	18	545	791	−246	18	
11	Hull F.C.	27	8	0	19	488	597	−109	16	
12	Huddersfield Giants	27	8	0	19	509	765	−256	16	
13	Castleford Tigers	27	8	0	19	464	866	−402	16	
14	Bradford Bulls	27	7	0	20	468	852	−384	14	

Updated to match(es) played on 12 September 2026. Source:
(L) League Leaders' Shield Winners

== Challenge Cup ==
Hull F.C. were first drawn on 12 January to play the newly-reformed Salford RLFC away in Round 3, following Salford's 42-10 defeat of Hammersmith Hills Hoists in their Round 2 fixture on 24 January. Following their victory against Salford, Hull F.C. were drawn to play the Leigh Leopards away in Round 4. Hull F.C. were ultimately knocked out of the 2026 Challenge Cup by Leigh in this fixture.

Date and time	Round	Versus	H/A	Venue	Result	Score	Tries	Goals	Attendance	TV	Report
6 February; 20:00	Round 3	Salford RLFC	A	Salford Community Stadium	W	60–0	Litten (3), Cust (2), Aydin, Bourouh, Barron, Romano, Batchelor, Arthur	Hardaker (8/11)	1,976	Not televised	
14 March; 15:00 (Note: Fixture moved from 13 March at 20:00 due to 'logistical issues' related to the Leigh Sports Village.)	Round 4	Leigh Leopards	A	Leigh Sports Village	L	16–6	Cust	Hardaker (1/1)	5,535	Not televised	

== Transfers ==
=== Gains ===
Player	Club	Contract	Date
(England) Harvie Hill	Wigan Warriors	2 years	March 2025
(Samoa) Sam Lisone	Leeds Rhinos	2 years	July 2025
(Australia) Jake Arthur	Newcastle Knights	2 years	August 2025
(England) Joe Phillips	Goole Vikings	1 year	September 2025
(England) Connor Bailey	York Knights	2 years	September 2025
(England) Joe Batchelor	St Helens	3 years	September 2025
(Scotland) James Bell	St Helens	3 years	September 2025
(France) Arthur Romano	Catalans Dragons	2 years	September 2025
(Australia) Ethan O'Neill	Leeds Rhinos	2 1/2 years	July 2026

==== Loans in ====
Player	Club	Loan period	Date
(England) Harry Newman	Leeds Rhinos	Three weeks	April 2026
(New Zealand) Jeremiah Mata'utia	Leeds Rhinos	Five weeks	April 2026
(Australia) Ethan O'Neill	Leeds Rhinos	One month	May 2026
(England) Max Wood	Warrington Wolves	One month	July 2026 (Note: Wood initially appeared on a month's loan in June 2026, however he was recalled by Warrington after two fixtures due to Toafofoa Sipley being injured.)

=== Losses ===
Player	Club	Contract	Date
(England) Cobie Wainhouse	Hull Kingston Rovers	2 years	August 2025
(New Zealand) Jordan Rapana	N/A	Retirement	September 2025
(England) Jordan Lane	Castleford Tigers	4 years	September 2025
(England) Jack Ashworth	Castleford Tigers	2 years	September 2025
(England) Zach Jebson	Midlands Hurricanes	2 years	October 2025
(England) Jack Charles	Hull Kingston Rovers	4 years	October 2025
(England) Will Gardiner	Bradford Bulls	2 years	October 2025
(England) Liam Watts	Goole Vikings	1 year	January 2026
(England) Owen Haldenby	Salford RLFC	1 year	January 2026
(Australia) Liam Knight	TBC		February 2026
(England) Ryan Westerman	Hull Kingston Rovers	End of season	June 2026

==== Loans out ====
Player	Club	Loan period	Date
(England) Denive Balmforth	York Knights	End of season	October 2025
(England) Matty Laidlaw	Hunslet R.L.F.C.	Four weeks	March 2026
(England) Logan Moy	Halifax Panthers		March 2026
(France) Hugo Salabio	Halifax Panthers		March 2026
(Australia) Jed Cartwright	St Helens	End of season	July 2026

== Squad ==
2026 Hull F.C. squad
First team squad			Coaching staff
1 (England) Will Pryce – FB, SO, SH; 2 (England) Harvey Barron – WG; 3 (England) Davy Litten – CE, FB, WG; 4 (England) Zak Hardaker (vc) – CE, FB, WG; 5 (England) Lewis Martin – WG; 6 (Australia) Jake Arthur – SO, SH; 7 (Australia) Aidan Sezer (c) – SH, SO; 8 (Samoa) Herman Ese'ese – PR, LF; 9 (England) Amir Bourouh – HK; 10 (England) Harvie Hill – PR; 11 (England) Joe Batchelor – SR; 12 (Australia) Jed Cartwright – SR, CE, LF; 13 (Samoa) John Asiata (vc) – LF, PR, SO	14 (Australia) Cade Cust – SO, HK; 15 (Scotland) James Bell – LF, SR, HK; 16 (Samoa) Sam Lisone – PR; 18 (Samoa) Ligi Sao – PR, SR; 19 (England) Tom Briscoe – WG, CE; 20 (Turkey) Yusuf Aydin – PR; 21 (France) Arthur Romano – CE, WG; 22 (England) Connor Bailey – SO, SH, SR; 23 (England) Brad Fash – LF, PR; 24 (England) Logan Moy – FB; 25 (England) Matty Laidlaw – PR; 26 (France) Hugo Salabio – PR	27 (England) Callum Kemp – SO, SH; 29 (England) Will Hutchinson – HK; 30 (England) Will Kirby – SR; 27 (England) Callum Kemp – SO, SH; 32 (England) Lloyd Kemp – FB; 34 (England) Joe Ward – WG; 35 (England) Ben Johnson – CE; 36 (England) Lennon Clark – SR; 39 (Australia) Ethan O'Neill – SR; -- (Ireland) Ed Chamberlain – CE, SR	Head coach: (England) Andy Last (interim); Assistant coach: (England) Simon Grix; Legend: (c) Captain(s); (vc) Vice-captain(s); (red card) = suspended; = injured; (gk) = Goal kicker; Updated: 11 September 2026; Source(s): 2026 Squad Numbers
