= Townend (surname) =

Townend is a surname. Notable people with the surname include

- Annie Quayle Townend (c.1845–1914), Australian-born New Zealand heiress and philanthropist
- Arnold Townend (1880–1968), English politician
- Arthur Townend (1924–2005), Canadian architect
- Carol Townend (born 1953), English writer of historical romances
- Charles Townend, English rugby league footballer of the 1890s
- Christine Townend (1944–2025), Australian animal rights activist, artist and author
- Francis Townend (1885–1915), English army officer and cricketer
- Gary Townend (1940–2021) was an English footballer
- Gertrude Townend, British nurse and suffragette
- Jack Townend (1918–2005), British illustrator and graphic artist
- Jody Townend (born 1997), Irish amateur jockey
- John Townend (1934–2018), British politician
- John Townend (rower) (1903–1926), British rower
- John Townend (rugby league), English rugby league footballer active between 1890 and 1910
- Lee Townend (born 1965), British Anglican priest
- Oliver Townend (born 1982), British event rider
- Paul Townend (born 1990), Irish jockey
- Peter Townend (editor) (1921–2001), British genealogist
- Peter Townend (novelist) (1935–1999), British thriller writer, photographer and journalist
- Peter Townend (surfer) (born 1953), Australian surfing champion
- Stuart Townend (headmaster) (1909–2002), British athlete, soldier and educator
- Stuart Townend (musician) (born 1963), English hymnwriter and composer
- Tosh Townend (born 1985), American skateboarder

== See also ==
- Townend, Cumbria, England
- Townsend (disambiguation)
- Tausend (surname)
