= Townson =

Townson (also Tounson) is a surname. The name most likely came from English origin, and is the north Lancashire pronunciation of Tomlinson. There may have been some confusion with Townsend which occurs in northwestern England. Some instances of Townson are probably variants of Townsend.

Notable people with this surname include:

- Chris Townson (1947–2008), American musician and illustrator
- Des Townson (1934–2008), New Zealand yacht designer
- Hazel Townson (1928–2010), English author
- John Townson (died 1835), Australian army officer
- Kevin Townson (born 1983), English footballer
- Robert Townson (disambiguation), several people
- Ronald Townson (1933–2001), American singer
- Thomas Townson (1715–1792), English priest

== See also ==
- Townson, Queensland, Lockyer Valley Region, Australia
