= John Townsend =

John Townsend may refer to:

== Politicians ==
- John Townsend (MP for Warwick), English politician who sat in the House of Commons from 1597 to 1614
- John Townsend (Irish politician) (1737–1810), Irish MP for Dingle, Doneraile and Castlemartyr
- John Townsend (mayor) (1783–1854), 37th mayor of Albany, NY
- John Townsend (New York City) (1789–1863), New York politician
- John Townsend (MP for Greenwich) (1819–1892), British politician and member of Parliament for Greenwich
- John Selby Townsend (1824–1892), American Democrat legislator and jurist from Iowa
- John G. Townsend Jr. (1871–1964), American businessman and politician, governor and senator from Delaware
- John Townsend (Wisconsin politician) (born 1938), Wisconsin politician

== Scientists ==
- John Kirk Townsend (1809–1851), American naturalist
- John Sealy Townsend (1868–1957), Irish physicist
- John W. Townsend Jr. (1924–2011), American physicist and aerospace engineer

== Sportspeople ==
- John Townsend (basketball) (1916–2001), American basketball player
- John Townsend (footballer) (born 1943), Australian rules footballer
- Johnny Townsend (American football) (born 1995), American football player

== Others ==
- John Townsend (Oyster Bay) (1608–1668), early settler of the American colonies
- John Townsend (1732–1809), cabinet maker of the Goddard and Townsend style
- John Townsend (educator) (1757–1826), English Congregationalist minister and founder of school for deaf children
- John P. Townsend (1832–1898), American financier
- John Rowe Townsend (1922–2014), British children's author
- John Richard Townsend (1930–2013), British painter
- John Townsend (musician) (active 1974–1980), musician with the Sanford-Townsend Band
- John Townsend (author) (born 1952), American psychologist and author

== See also ==
- John Townend (rugby league), rugby league footballer who played in the 1890s and 1900s
- John Townend (born 1934), British politician
- John Townshend (disambiguation)
