= Hull F.C. =

English professional rugby league club

Club information
- Full name: Hull Football Club
- Nickname(s): Black & Whites; The Airlie Birds
- Short name: Hull
- Colours: Black and White
- Founded: 1865; 161 years ago
- Website: hullfc.com

Current details
- Ground: MKM Stadium (25,586)
- Chairman: Andrew Thirkhill; David Hood
- Coach: Andy Last (interim)
- Captain: Aiden Sezer
- Competition: Super League
- 2026 season: 11th
- Current season

Uniforms
Home colours	Away colours

Records
- Championships: 6 (1920, 1921, 1936, 1956, 1958, 1983)
- Challenge Cups: 5 (1914, 1982, 2005, 2016, 2017)
- Other honours: 12

Hull Football Club, commonly referred to as Hull, Hull F.C., or the Airlie Birds, is a professional rugby league club based in Kingston upon Hull, East Riding of Yorkshire, England. The city of Hull is split in two by the River Hull with Hull F.C. representing the west side and cross-city rivals Hull Kingston Rovers representing the east side.

Hull play their home games at the MKM Stadium and compete in Super League, the top tier of British rugby league. The club's traditional home colours are white shirts with black hoops and black shorts.

Hull have won the League Championship six times and the Challenge Cup five times.

== History ==
=== Founding ===
The club was first founded in 1865 by a group of ex-schoolboys from York, led by Anthony Bradley, who had been at Rugby School. They met at the Young Men's Fellowship of St Mary's Church, Lowgate, where Reverend Scott was the vicar and whose five sons made up the nucleus of the team, together with a number of plumber and glazier recruits. In 1871 it was the first Yorkshire club to join the Rugby Football Union and in 1881 merged with another club; Hull White Star.

=== The early years ===
After an acrimonious split from the Rugby Football Union in 1895, Hull F.C. were one of the initial 22 clubs who formed the Northern Union. That same year the club moved from East Hull to the Hull Athletic Club at the Boulevard in Airlie Street. Thus picking up the nickname "the Airlie Birds". In September 1895 8,000 people turned out to witness Hull F.C.'s first match there in which they beat Liversedge RFC. The Oxford-educated Cyril Lemprière (1870–1939), who also played for Yorkshire, was captain of Hull during the 1895–96 and 1897–98 seasons.

Between 1908 and 1910, Hull F.C. lost three consecutive Challenge Cup Finals: in the first they failed to score against Hunslet who would go on to win All Four Cups; in the second they failed to score against Wakefield Trinity; and in the third final in 1910 they held Leeds to a 7–7 draw at Fartown, Huddersfield but were heavily beaten in the replay held two days later.

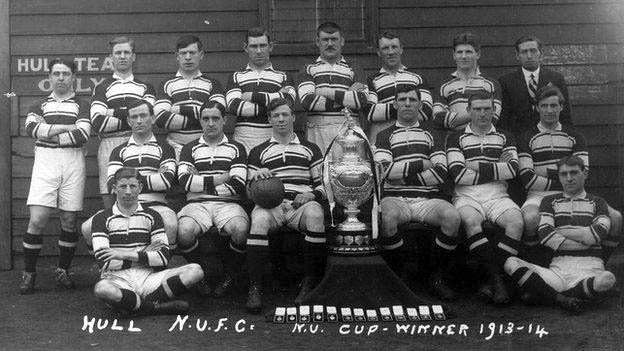
Hull team of 1914 with the Challenge Cup won that season

=== World War I and after ===
In 1913 the club paid Hunslet F.C. a then-world record of £600, plus £14 per match, for Billy Batten, the first representative from Hull F.C. so far inducted into the 17-member British Rugby League Hall of Fame. With Billy Batten on board, the club won their first Challenge Cup in 1914, beating Huddersfield in the semi-final and Wakefield Trinity in the final held in Halifax. Playing alongside Billy Batten on the day of the final was John "Jack" Harrison VC, MC who scored a try, one of 52 he scored in the 1914–5 season alone, a club record that still stands. Australian Jim Devereux became the first player to score 100 career tries for Hull, but on the other side of the ledger, 12 Hull F.C. players were killed during the First World War.

In 1920, Billy Batten was once again key in Hull F.C.'s first ever Championship Final, scoring the only try in their 3–2 victory over Huddersfield. But the rest of the early 1920s were bittersweet years for the club, with Hull F.C. not able to match the successes of 1914. In 1921, the club lost the Yorkshire County Cup but won the county championship, both against cross-city rivals Hull Kingston Rovers, before losing a further two consecutive cup finals in 1922 and 1923 to Rochdale Hornets and Leeds respectively. However, Hull F.C. managed to win the Yorkshire County Cup in 1923 and finish top of the league.

In the early 1930s Hull F.C. had a full back and goal kicker called Joe Oliver who was so dependable with the boot that the crowd at one match spontaneously started singing the Gene Autry song Old Faithful to him. Hull F.C. supporters adopted the song as their battle cry from then on.

Hull F.C.'s record attendance was set in 1936 when 28,798 turned up for a visit by Leeds for a third round Challenge Cup match.

=== The post-World War II years ===
On Monday 8 September 1952, the Australian "Kangaroos" played Hull F.C. at the Boulevard. They had opened their tour of the U.K. with a victory at Keighley two days earlier, and they continued their winning run with a 28–0 victory over Hull.

In 1955, the black Welshman Roy Francis became the first black professional coach in any British team sport when he switched from playing on the wing to coaching Hull F.C..

In 1956, Hull F.C. won the league championship when Colin Hutton kicked a last-minute penalty in the final against Halifax at Maine Road, Manchester. Hull F.C. won the play-offs again in 1958, against Workington Town, and also won the European Club championship in 1957. These triumphs helped heal the wounds of two successive Yorkshire County Cup Final defeats in 1955 and 1957, with the club losing two further Challenge Cup finals in 1959 and 1960 to Wigan and Wakefield Trinity, as well as losing the cup finals at Wembley Stadium in 1959 and 1960.

Johnny Whiteley became a player coach in October 1963, and when Roy Francis retired as Hull F.C. coach in 1965 Whiteley took over. Hull F.C. lost to Wakefield Trinity 17–10 in the 1968 Rugby Football League Championship final at Headingley on 4 May 1968, and Whiteley resigned in 1970 to coach Hull Kingston Rovers. Ivor Watts was then appointed coach from 1970 to 1971, during which time Hull F.C. won 28 matches and lost 17.

With the appointment of Arthur Bunting as coach in 1978, Hull F.C. began a period of dominance, returning to the top flight by winning all of their 26 Division Two matches in 1978–79, the only time a club has won all of its league matches in a season. The club lost the 1980 Challenge Cup final against Hull Kingston Rovers 10–5 and had to wait until 2016 to win at Wembley. In 1982, Hull F.C. lost to Widnes in the Premiership Final, but avenged the defeat with an 18–9 Challenge Cup replay win at Elland Road.

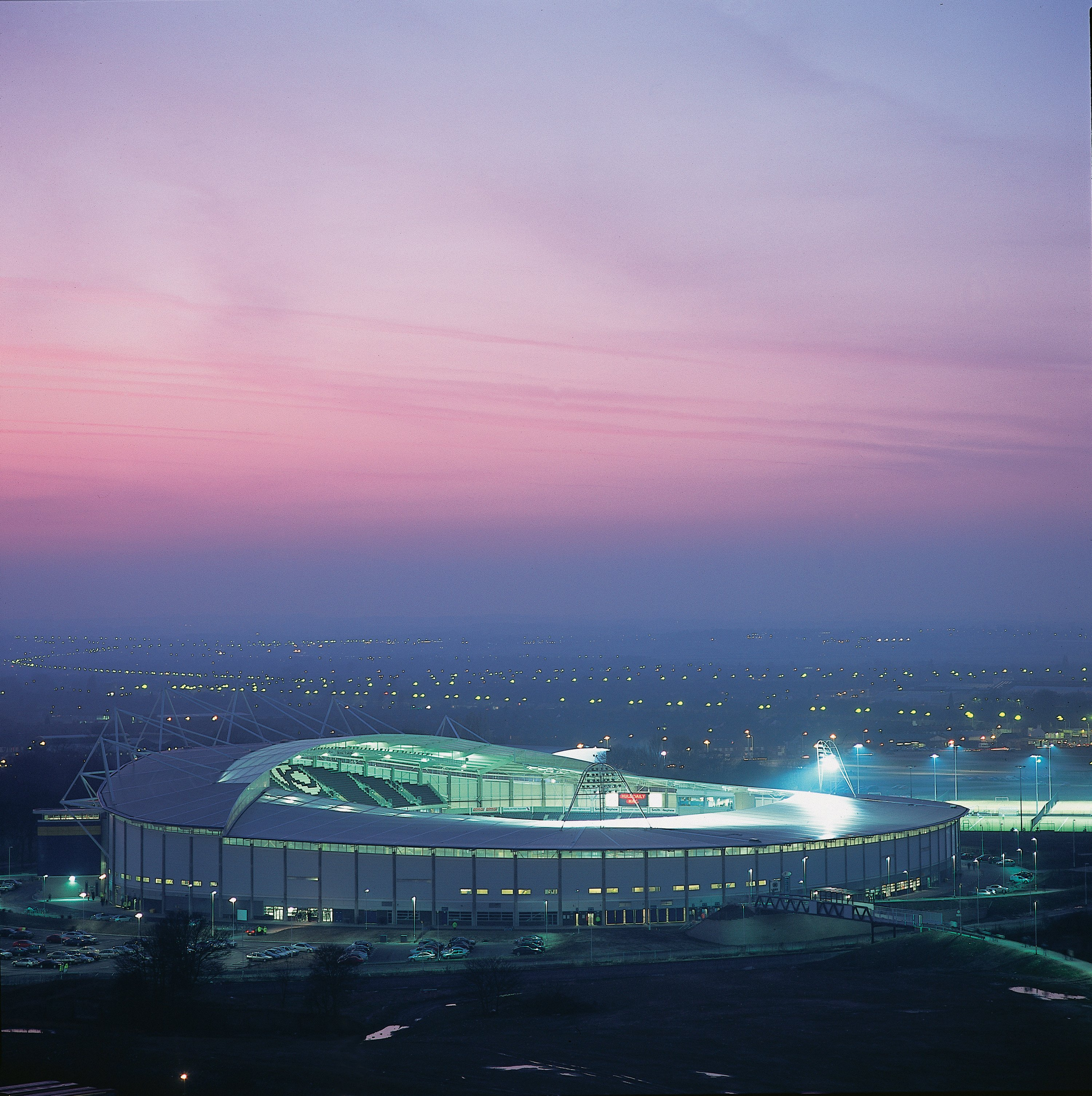
MKM Stadium

Hull F.C. eventually won the league in 1983 and also reached the Premiership final, the Challenge Cup final, and the Yorkshire County Cup Final that year, but with the latter trophy their only reward from those three finals. They also lost to Featherstone Rovers at Wembley in one of the great Challenge Cup final upsets, as well as losing the Premiership final for three years running.

The signing of Australian Peter Sterling, later to be inducted into the Australian Rugby League Hall of Fame in 2016, maintained Hull F.C.'s strength, and Bunting's men went to their third successive Yorkshire Cup beating Hull Kingston Rovers 29–12. But they were edged out of arguably the greatest ever Challenge Cup Final in 1985 by Wigan at Wembley Stadium in front of 99,801 fans, the rugby league attendance record for Wembley, with the final score 28 to 24 in Wigan's favour. A number of subsequent coaches such as Brian Smith (1988–90) failed to deliver consistent success. But although Hull F.C. lost the Premiership final in 1989 to Widnes, two years later they returned to beat Widnes 14–4 at Old Trafford under coach Noel Cleal.

Royce Simmons moved to England to coach Hull F.C. for two seasons from 1992 to 1994. When financial trouble forced Hull F.C. to put seven players on the transfer list in June 1993, Simmons ran five marathons to raise money to pay for players from Australia.

=== The summer season era ===
In 1996, the first tier of British rugby league clubs played the inaugural Super League season and changed from a winter to a summer season. As the sport entered a new era in Britain, controversy was sparked in the city of Hull when it was suggested that Hull F.C. should merge with Hull Kingston Rovers to form "Humberside". Hull F.C.'s shareholders gave the idea general approval but it was ultimately rejected. Like many other rugby league clubs, the club instead re-branded, becoming the "Hull Sharks". But the newly rebranded team finished below the cut-off point of 10th in the existing top flight and so were excluded from the new Super League.

Phil Sigsworth joined the club in 1996 and coached them to the First Division championship title and promotion to Super League in 1997, but the team struggled to compete in the top division. Off-field issues in 1999 saw the club offered a merger with Gateshead Thunder, including being offered £1.25 million as part of the agreement. However, the club reverted to the name Hull F.C. at the start of the 2000 Super League season and continued to play at The Boulevard without any acknowledgement of Gateshead. A new Gateshead Thunder was formed for the 2001 Premiership season, with ex-St. Helens coach Shaun McRae at the helm until 2004.

In January 2003, after 107 years at the Boulevard, Hull F.C. moved to the £44 million state-of-the-art council-owned Kingston Communications Stadium, more commonly known as the KC Stadium, and the rejuvenation of the club continued. Although they were joint tenants at the stadium alongside the city's championship football club side Hull City A.F.C., the two teams shared use of the stadium, forcing Hull F.C. to play a cup match away at Doncaster to avoid two matches clashing.

Shaun McRae left the club to return to Australia at the end of the 2004 season and was replaced by McRae's deputy and former England coach John Kear. In his first season at the club, Kear led Hull F.C. to the Rugby League Challenge Cup Final for the first time since 1985, defeating Leeds 25–24 in a thrilling final at Cardiff's Millennium Stadium. Paul Cooke's 77th minute try was converted by Danny Brough to give Hull a 1-point lead, which they held onto after Hull F.C. captain Richard Swain charged down a drop-goal attempt from Leeds skipper Kevin Sinfield in the dying seconds of the match. John Kear left Hull F.C. on 3 April 2006 after a disappointing start to the season, seeing Hull F.C. lose four out of their first seven league games as well as their defence of the Challenge Cup ending at the first hurdle when beaten by the Bradford Bulls 23–12.

John Kear was replaced by Australian Peter Sharp, recruited from the Parramatta Eels where he was assistant coach. Between 14 April and 15 July 2006 Hull F.C. won 13 matches in succession, including a 27–26 beating of the league leaders St Helens on 8 June 2006, the first time they had beaten St Helens on their home ground for 18 years. This run of wins ended in defeat at Harlequins RL on 23 July 2006, resulting in Hull F.C. managing to finish in second place overall, their highest league position in the Super League era. In the finals they lost to league leaders St. Helens in the first Grand Final playoff game, but succeeded in reaching the final by defeating the reigning champions Bradford. Over 20,000 Hull F.C. fans travelled to Old Trafford for the Grand Final, and the overall attendance that day broke the Grand Final record, mainly due to the stadium's recent expansion. But Hull F.C. again lost out to the Saints, this time by 26–4.

Hull F.C. signed five players for the 2007 season: Matt Sing, a prolific National Rugby League try-scorer and Australian representative; Hutch Maiava; Willie Manu; Danny Tickle; and Wayne Godwin. The "Hull Derby" also returned for the 2007 season due to Rovers' promotion from National League 1. The first of four of these derby matches was played on Easter Monday, 9 April 2007, at the KC Stadium in front of a sell-out attendance of 23,002 and ended with a win for Hull F.C., who had been struggling early in the season. The final score was 22–14 with Sid Domic crossing the line for Hull F.C. in the final seconds.

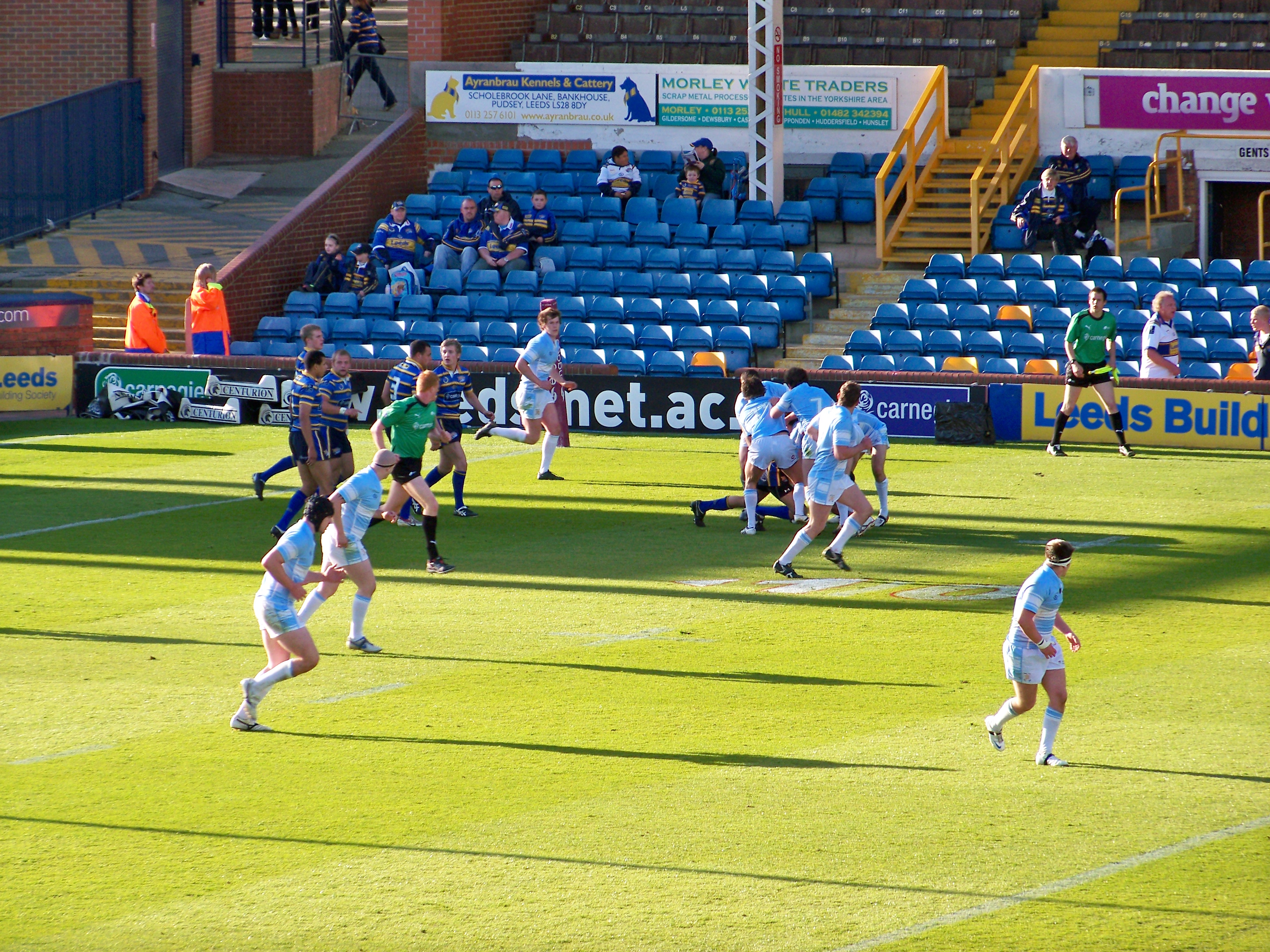
Hull F.C.Academy facing Leeds Academy at Headingley, May 2009

On 23 April stand-off Paul Cooke controversially resigned from Hull F.C. to join Hull Kingston Rovers. Cooke claimed he was out of contract as he had not signed the contract that the club had offered him. Following his departure, club chief executive David Plummer resigned and his replacement James Rule came in for much criticism.

Hull F.C. endured a poor 2008 season and on 19 May 2008 the club dismissed coach Peter Sharp, appointing his assistant Richard Agar as his replacement a week later. John Sharp has since been named as an addition to the Hull F.C. coaching staff. Hull F.C. finished a poor 11th in the League in 2008, falling far short of the fans' expectations, although a Challenge cup final appearance and a successful franchise application ensured the season was not a complete failure.

The club announced that Australian test forward Michael Crocker would sign for the club on a three-year contract from the start of the 2008–09 season, but in March 2009 he was denied a visa to come to England to play for Hull F.C.. Fullback Chris Thorman signed a one-year deal for 2009 after leaving Huddersfield Giants, while Matty Dale, Matt Sing, and James Webster were released at the end of the season, with former Hull Kingston Rovers favourite Webster having played only one game for Hull F.C.. Several long-serving players left the club at the end of the forgettable 2009 season, including Paul King, Graeme Horne, and Gareth Raynor.

The club announced four big name signings for the 2010 Super League season: Craig Fitzgibbon, Mark O'Meley, Sean Long, and Jordan Tansey, although Tansey arrived at the club towards the end of the 2009 season after being released early from his contract at Sydney Roosters. Super League XV started well with five wins from the first seven games, the two losses coming away against Crusaders and Wigan Warriors. Hull F.C. beat Hull Kingston Rovers 18–14 in the first derby of the year at Craven Park, but then followed a period of just one win from five games, resulting in the team being convincingly knocked out of the Challenge Cup by Leeds. Hull F.C. finished the regular season in 6th place, but a convincing 21–4 home defeat by rivals Hull Kingston Rovers brought an early end to their playoff campaign.

On 22 July 2011 it was confirmed that Hull City's Head of Football Operations Adam Pearson and his close friend Mikey Drake had purchased the entire shareholding of the club together, and had taken over full control from Kath Hetherington. In a statement on the club's website it was also confirmed that James Rule would continue as chief executive. Richard Agar left the club at the end of the 2011 season and was replaced by Australian Peter Gentle.

The 2012 season was a largely transitional one, with high player turnover and many injuries hampering the side's progress mid-season. However, the club finished a respectable 6th in the regular season and went on to convincingly beat Huddersfield in the first round of play-off games, eventually falling to defeat Warrington away in the preliminary semi-finals.

In the 2013 season Hull F.C. again finished 6th in the regular season and beat Catalans at home in the first round of the play-offs, only to be comprehensively beaten 76–18 by Huddersfield in the second round. Hull F.C. also reached the Challenge cup final for the first time in 5 years but were beaten 16–0 by Wigan. On 24 September 2013 Hull F.C. announced the departure of Peter Gentle with two years still remaining on his contract, with the record loss to Huddersfield in the play-offs along with the poor performance at Wembley appearing to be the main factors behind his demise. The next day Hull F.C. announced that 34-year-old assistant Lee Radford would become Head Coach from 2014, and that Andy Last would step up to become Lee's assistant. Former player Motu Tony became the new director of football, replacing outgoing director Shaun McRae.

In 2016, a promising beginning to the season was crushed with a 46–6 loss to Widnes. After the match, coach Lee Radford and his staff were asked to leave the changing room by the Hull F.C. squad. Following this initial defeat, Hull enjoyed a 10-game winning streak and finished on top of the Super League table. The club won at Wembley Stadium for the first time in the club's history, defeating Warrington in the 2016 Challenge Cup Final and defending their title in 2017 by defeating Wigan. Following the win at Wembley, Hull ended the 2016 season by finishing 3rd in the Super 8's, although later losing to Wigan in the semi-finals of the play offs.

In March 2020, Hull F.C. announced the departure of Lee Radford after a 38–4 home loss to Warrington Wolves. It turned out to be Hull F.C.'s final fixture before the nation was put into lockdown due to the coronavirus pandemic. Assistant coach Andy Last was put in interim charge of the club until the end of the 2020 season, guiding the team to the play-off semi-finals where they were eventually upended by Wigan Warriors. Last departed the club at the end of the 2020 season to take up an assistant coach role at fellow Super League club Wakefield Trinity. In November 2020, Hull F.C. announced that Brett Hodgson would take over as head coach of the club for the 2021 season, with the Australian coach winning his first game of the season against Huddersfield Giants, the club he once played for.

On 17 May 2021, Hull F.C. played their first match in front of spectators following the COVID-19 lockdown, resulting in them being defeated 27–10 by Catalans Dragons at home. The club started the 2021 Super League season in strong fashion, losing only once in their opening seven games. However, the club won only once in their last nine matches, seeing them finish the year in 8th place on the table.

In 2022 Hull F.C. finished the Super League season in 9th place on the table. Head coach Brett Hodgson resigned from his post and was replaced by Tony Smith for the 2023 season.

In 2023, Hull F.C. started the Super League season with two wins in a row under new head coach Tony Smith. However, the club would then record seven successive league defeats and by round 10 of the competition sat second bottom on the table.

Hull F.C. started the 2024 Super League season poorly, losing six of their first seven matches with their only victory coming in a last gasp effort against the London Broncos. The 2024 season under Smith saw Hull F.C. concede 50 points or more on three occasions, and was the first time the club had lost 20 or more league fixtures since 1999. After 18 months in charge, Tony Smith stepped down as head coach on 11 April 2024.

In the 2025 Super League season, Hull F.C. signed a number of new recruits and also had a new head coach in John Cartwright. The club's performances improved on the pitch throughout the year with the team finishing in seventh place on the table.

== Stadiums ==
=== 1895–2002: The Boulevard ===
Hull F.C. moved into The Boulevard shortly after the formation of the Northern Rugby Football Union in 1895, and between 1904 and 1905 the ground was shared with Hull City A.F.C.. The Boulevard also hosted many international rugby league games, and like a number of grounds during the 1940s, 1970s, and 1980s, the pitch at The Boulevard was surrounded by a Motorcycle speedway track that was also later used for greyhound racing.

=== 2003–present: MKM Stadium ===
Hull F.C. moved into the KC Stadium in 2003, renamed KCOM Stadium in 2016 and MKM Stadium in 2021, which they share with Hull City A.F.C. for a second time in their history. The record attendance for a rugby league ground was at KCOM Stadium in 2007, when 23,004 spectators watched the club play local rivals Hull Kingston Rovers.

== Kit sponsors and manufacturers ==
Year	Kit Manufacturer	Main Shirt Sponsor
1982–1992	Umbro	ABI Caravans
1992–1994	Ellgren	Shopacheck
1994–1995	Pelada	ABI Caravans
1996–1998	OS	International Corporate Events
1999	Rossco	JWE Telecom
2000	Avec	JWE Telecom
2001–2002	Exito	KIT
2003	Exito	JVP
2004–2005	Exito	The Deep
2006–2012	ISC	P&O Ferries
2013–2016	ISC	Hyundai
2017	ISC	Bambu Scaffolding
2018	ISC	The Goldthorpe Property Group
2019	ISC	Nationwide Concrete Flooring
2020	ISC	Atropa
2021–	Hummel	Atropa

== Rivalries ==
The club's main rivalry is with cross-city side Hull KR in which they contest the Hull Derby.

== 2026 squad ==
2027 Hull F.C. squad
First team squad			Coaching staff
(Samoa) John Asiata (vc) – LF; (Turkey) Yusuf Aydin – PR, LF; (England) Connor Bailey – SR, LF; (Wales) Denive Balmforth – HK; (England) Connor Barley – WG, CE; (England) Harvey Barron – WG; (England) Joe Batchelor – SR, CE; (Ireland) Ed Chamberlain – CE, SR; (Australia) Daly Cherry-Evans – SH, SO; (England) Lennon Clark – SR	(Australia) Joshua Coric – PR; (Australia) Cade Cust – SO, SH, HK; (France) Alrix Da Costa – HK; (England) Roman Dawson – CE, WG, SR; (Samoa) Herman Ese'ese – PR; (England) Harvie Hill – PR; (England) Bailey Hodgson – FB, CE; (England) Will Hutchinson – HK; (England) Callum Kemp – SO, SH; (England) Lloyd Kemp – CE, FB; (Australia) Josh Kerr – PR, SR; (England) Will Kirby – SR; (England) Matty Laidlaw – PR	(Samoa) Sam Lisone – PR; (New Zealand) Isaac Liu – LF, PR; (England) Lewis Martin – WG; (England) Logan Moy – FB; (Australia) Ethan O'Neill – SR; (Samoa) Junior Pauga – CE, WG; (England) Will Pryce – FB, SO, SH; (Australia) Jordan Swann – CE; (England) Joe Ward – WG; (England) Max Wood – PR	Head coach: (England) Steve McNamara; Assistant coaches: (Australia) Josh Drinkwater; (England) Andy Last; (England) Scott Taylor; Legend: (c) Captain(s); (vc) Vice-captain(s); (red card) = suspended; = injured; (gk) = Goal kicker; Updated: Source(s): https://www.hullfc.com/team/first-team

== 2026 transfers ==
=== Gains ===
Player	Club	Contract	Date
(England) Harvie Hill	Wigan Warriors	2 years	March 2025
(Samoa) Sam Lisone	Leeds Rhinos	2 years	July 2025
(Australia) Jake Arthur	Newcastle Knights	2 years	August 2025
(England) Joe Phillips	Goole Vikings	1 year	September 2025
(England) Connor Bailey	York Knights	2 years	September 2025
(England) Joe Batchelor	St Helens	3 years	September 2025
(Scotland) James Bell	St Helens	3 years	September 2025
(France) Arthur Romano	Catalans Dragons	2 years	September 2025
(Australia) Ethan O'Neill	Leeds Rhinos	2 1/2 years	July 2026

==== Loans in ====
Player	Club	Loan period	Date
(England) Harry Newman	Leeds Rhinos	Three weeks	April 2026
(New Zealand) Jeremiah Mata'utia	Leeds Rhinos	Five weeks	April 2026
(Australia) Ethan O'Neill	Leeds Rhinos	One month	May 2026
(England) Max Wood	Warrington Wolves	One month	July 2026 (Note: Wood initially appeared on a month's loan in June 2026, however he was recalled by Warrington after two fixtures due to Toafofoa Sipley being injured.)

=== Losses ===
Player	Club	Contract	Date
(England) Cobie Wainhouse	Hull Kingston Rovers	2 years	August 2025
(New Zealand) Jordan Rapana	N/A	Retirement	September 2025
(England) Jordan Lane	Castleford Tigers	4 years	September 2025
(England) Jack Ashworth	Castleford Tigers	2 years	September 2025
(England) Zach Jebson	Midlands Hurricanes	2 years	October 2025
(England) Jack Charles	Hull Kingston Rovers	4 years	October 2025
(England) Will Gardiner	Bradford Bulls	2 years	October 2025
(England) Liam Watts	Goole Vikings	1 year	January 2026
(England) Owen Haldenby	Salford RLFC	1 year	January 2026
(Australia) Liam Knight	TBC		February 2026
(England) Ryan Westerman	Hull Kingston Rovers	End of season	June 2026

==== Loans out ====
Player	Club	Loan period	Date
(England) Denive Balmforth	York Knights	End of season	October 2025
(England) Matty Laidlaw	Hunslet R.L.F.C.	Four weeks	March 2026
(England) Logan Moy	Halifax Panthers		March 2026
(France) Hugo Salabio	Halifax Panthers		March 2026
(Australia) Jed Cartwright	St Helens	End of season	July 2026

== Players ==
=== Hall of Fame inductees ===
The following players have been inducted into Hull F.C.'s Hall of Fame:

Bill Drake · Chris Davidson · Gary Kemble · Richard Horne · Greg Mackay · Ivor Watts · James Leuluai · Jim Drake · Keith Boxall · Mick Crane · Paul Prendiville · Richard Swain · Tevita Vaikona · Trevor Skerrett · Billy Batten · Jim Kennedy · Joe Oliver · Clive Sullivan · Peter Sterling · Garry Schofield · Mick Scott · Arthur Keegan · Tommy Harris · Paul Eastwood · Phil Bell

=== Captains ===
- 1895 to 1896 – Cyril Lempriere
- 1896 to 1897 – Charlie Townend
- 1897 to 1898 – Cyril Lempriere
- 1898 to 1900 – Herbert Wiles
- 1900 to 1901 – Jack Townend
- 1901 to 1902 – Tom Stitt
- 1902 to 1904 – Harry Taylor
- 1904 to 1905 – Jack Ritson
- 1905 to 1906 – James Harrison
- 1906 to 1907 – A. E. Freer
- 1907 to 1909 – Harry Taylor
- 1909 to 1910 – Billie Anderson/Billy Anderson
- 1910 to 1912 – George Connell
- 1912 to 1913 – Ed Rogers,
  Billie Anderson/Billy Anderson,
  Herb Gilbert
- 1913 to 1915 – Herb Gilbert
- 1915 to 1919 – Billy Batten
- 1919 to 1921 – Jim Kennedy
- 1921 to 1922 – Jim Kennedy, Billy Stone
- 1922 to 1923 – Billy Stone
- 1923 to 1924 – Edgar Morgan
- 1924 to 1925 – Jim Kennedy
- 1925 to 1928 – Eddie Caswell
- 1928 to 1930 – Harold Bowman
- 1930 to 1931 – Joe Oliver
- 1931 to 1933 – George Bateman
- 1933 to 1936 – Joe Oliver
- 1936 to 1939 – Harold Ellerington
- 1939 to 1945 – No fixed captain
- 1945 to 1946 – Charlie Booth
- 1946 to 1947 – Freddie Miller
- 1947 to 1948 – Ernie Lawrence
- 1948 to 1949 – George Watt
- 1949 to 1950 – Ernie Lawrence
- 1950 to 1955 – Roy Francis
- 1955 to 1957 – Mick Scott
- 1957 to 1965 – Johnny Whiteley
  (Bill Drake deputy 1962...63)
- 1965 to 1971 – Arthur Keegan
- 1971 to 1974 – Clive Sullivan
- 1974 to 1975 – Chris Davidson
- 1975 to 1978 – Brian Hancock
- 1978 to 1980 – Vince Farrar
- 1980 to 1981 – Steve Norton, Charlie Stone
- 1981 to 1985 – David Topliss
- 1985 to 1987 – Lee Crooks
- 1987 to 1990 – Dane O'Hara
- 1990 to 1992 – Greg Mackey
- 1992 to 1994 – Russ Walker
- 1994 to 1996 – Steve McNamara
- 1996 – Gary Divorty
- 1997 – Andy Fisher
- 1998 – Alan Hunte, Gary Lester
- 1999 – Karl Harrison
- 2000 to 2001 – Tony Grimaldi
- 2002 to 2004 – Jason Smith
- 2005 to 2006 – Richard Swain
- 2007 to 2009 – Lee Radford
- 2010 – Sean Long
- 2011 – Craig Fitzgibbon
- 2012 – Andy Lynch
- 2013 to 2017 – Gareth Ellis
- 2018 to present – Danny Houghton

== Past coaches ==
Also see Category:Hull F.C. coaches.

- J. Gray 1895–1900
- W. Wright, C. Hunter 1900–3
- H. Coates 1903 to 1908
- J. Lewis 1908–12
- Harry Taylor
- Sid Melville 1912–27
- Edgar Wrigley 1927–31
- Edward Caswell 1931–46
- Ted Tattersfield 1946–9
- Roy Francis 1949–63
- John Whiteley 1963–70
- Ivor Watts 1970–71
- David Doyle-Davidson 1972–73
- Clive Sullivan 1973–74
- David Doyle-Davidson 1974–77
- Arthur Bunting 1978–85
- Len Casey 1986–88
- Tony Dean & Keith Hepworth 1988
- Brian Smith 1988–90
- Noel Cleal 1991–92
- Royce Simmons 1992–94
- Tony Gordon 1994
- Phil Windley & Russ Walker 1994–95
- Phil Windley 1995
- Phil Sigsworth 1996–97
- Peter Walsh 1997–99
- Steve Crooks 1999
- Shaun McRae 2000–04
- John Kear 2005–06
- Peter Sharp 2006–08
- Richard Agar 2008–11
- Peter Gentle 2012–13
- Lee Radford 2014–20
- Andy Last 2020
- Brett Hodgson 2021–22
- Tony Smith 2023–24
- John Cartwright 2025–26

== Seasons ==
=== Super League era ===
Season	League									Play-offs	Challenge Cup	Other competitions	Name	Tries	Name	Points
Season	Division	P	W	D	L	F	A	Pts (Note: Win percentage for 2020 and 2021)	Pos	Play-offs	Challenge Cup	Other competitions	Top try scorer		Top point scorer	
1996	Division One	20	14	0	6	565	392	28	3rd		R5					
1997	Division One	20	18	1	1	617	228	37	1st		QF					
1998	Super League	23	8	0	15	421	574	16	9th		R5					
1999	Super League	30	5	0	25	422	921	10	13th		QF					
2000	Super League	28	12	1	15	630	681	25	7th		R4					
2001	Super League	28	20	2	6	772	630	42	3rd	Lost in Preliminary Semi Final	QF					
2002	Super League	28	16	0	12	742	674	32	5th	Lost in Elimination Playoffs	R4					
2003	Super League	28	13	3	12	701	577	27	7th		QF					
2004	Super League	28	19	2	7	843	478	40	3rd	Lost in Elimination Playoffs	QF					
2005	Super League	28	15	2	11	756	670	32	5th	Lost in Preliminary Semi Final	W					
2006	Super League	28	20	0	8	720	578	40	2nd	Lost in Grand Final	R4					
2007	Super League	27	14	2	11	573	553	30	4th	Lost in Preliminary Semi Final	QF					
2008	Super League	27	8	1	18	538	699	17	11th		RU					
2009	Super League	27	10	0	17	502	623	20	12th		R4					
2010	Super League	27	16	0	11	569	584	32	6th	Lost in Elimination Playoffs	R4					
2011	Super League	27	13	1	13	718	569	27	8th	Lost in Elimination Playoffs	QF					
2012	Super League	27	15	2	10	696	621	32	6th	Lost in Preliminary Semi Final	R4		Tom Briscoe	21	Danny Tickle	196
2013	Super League	27	13	2	12	652	563	28	6th	Lost in Preliminary Semi Final	RU		Ben Crooks	20	Danny Tickle	120
2014	Super League	27	10	2	15	653	586	22	11th		R4					
2015	Super League	30	12	0	18	620	716	24	8th		QF					
2016	Super League	30	20	0	10	749	579	40	3rd	Lost in Semi Final	W					
2017	Super League	30	17	1	12	714	655	35	3rd	Lost in Semi Final	W					
2018	Super League	30	11	0	19	615	786	22	8th		QF					
2019	Super League	29	15	0	14	645	768	30	6th		SF					
2020	Super League	17	9	0	8	405	436	52.94	6th	Lost in Semi Final	QF					
2021	Super League	21	8	1	12	409	476	40.48	8th		SF					
2022	Super League	27	11	0	16	508	675	22	9th		QF					
2023	Super League	27	10	0	17	476	654	20	10th		QF					
2024	Super League	27	3	0	24	328	894	6	11th		R6					
2025	Super League	27	13	1	13	539	461	27	7th		QF					
2026	Super League	27	8	0	19	488	597	16	11th		R4					

== Honours ==
Major titles
Competition	Wins	Years won
RFL Championship First Division / Super League	6	1919–20, 1920–21, 1935–36, 1955–56, 1957–58, 1982–83
Challenge Cup	5	1913–14, 1981–82, 2005, 2016, 2017

Other titles
Competition	Wins	Years won
Premiership	1	1990–91
League Cup	1	1981–82
BBC2 Floodlit Trophy	1	1979–80
RFL Yorkshire League	4	1918–19, 1922–23, 1926–27, 1935–36
RFL Yorkshire Cup	5	1923–24, 1969–70, 1982–83, 1983–84, 1984–85

== Records ==
=== Player records ===
- Most tries in a match: 7 by Clive Sullivan vs Doncaster, 15 April 1968
- Most goals in a match: 14 by Jim Kennedy vs Rochdale Hornets- 7 April 1921, Sammy Lloyd v Oldham – 10 September 1978, Matt Crowther v Sheffield Eagles – 2 March 2003
- Most points in a match: 36 by Jim Kennedy vs Keighley, 29 January 1921
- Most tries in a season: 52 by Jack Harrison, 1914–15
- Most goals in a season: 170 by Sammy Lloyd, 1978–79
- Most points in a season: 369 by Sammy Lloyd, 1978–79
- Consecutive Tries: 11 by Jack Harrison, 1914–15 & Richard Horne, 2006

=== Career records ===
- Most goals: 687 – Joe Oliver 1928–37 & 1943–45
- Most tries: 250 – Clive Sullivan 1961–74 & 1981–85
- Most points: 1,842 – Joe Oliver 1928–37 & 1943–45
- Most appearances: 501 – Edward Rogers 1906–25

=== Team records ===
- Highest score: 88–0 vs Sheffield Eagles, 2 March 2003
- Highest against: 80–10 vs Warrington Wolves, 30 August 2018
- Highest losing margin: 71 points (71–0) vs Bradford Bulls, 1 October 2005
- Highest attendance (The Boulevard): 28,798 vs Leeds, 7 March 1936
- Highest attendance (KC Stadium): 23,004 vs Hull KR, 2 September 2007
- Highest attendance (Challenge Cup): 99,801 vs Wigan, 4 May 1985 (1985 Challenge Cup Final)
- Highest attendance vs an international touring team: 16,616 vs Australia, 23 September 1948 (1948–49 Kangaroo tour)
- Only team to have won every single league game in a season: 1979 Division Two
- Most consecutive Super League victories: 13 games, (14 April 2006 – 15 July 2006, beating Huddersfield, Wakefield, Catalans, Wigan, Bradford, Leeds, Huddersfield, St Helens, Harlequins, Castleford, Catalans, Salford & Warrington).
- Most consecutive Super League Losses: 13 Games, (5 May 2018 – 7 February 2019, Losing to Huddersfield, St Helens, Wakefield, Hull KR, Wakefield, Huddersfield, Warrington, Castleford, St Helens, Catalans, Wigan, Hull KR & Castleford)

== Other teams ==
In addition to the men's team, a number of other teams compete under the Hull F.C. brand, including academy, wheelchair, women's, and several youth teams. In 2020 a Learning Disability Rugby League (LDRL) team was founded. Physical Disability Rugby League (PDRL) and Masters teams were established in 2022.

=== Women's team ===
Hull F.C. began developing their women's team through a partnership with local school Sirius Academy, which worked with the Hull F.C. Community Foundation to establish teams playing at the under-14s and under-16s level using the Hull F.C. brand. In April 2018, the Hull team made their début in the RFL Women's Championship. A month later they recorded their first competitive win, defeating Oulton Raidettes 26–22 in the preliminary round of the 2018 Women's Challenge Cup, and at the end of the season they competed in the play-off semi-finals.

In 2020 the Hull women's team was drawn against local rivals Hull Kingston Rovers in the Challenge Cup. However, the season was cancelled and the first women's Hull derby match did not take place until the quarter-finals of the 2022 League Cup. The team continued to compete in the Championship until the restructuring of the league pyramid saw them drop down to League 1.

In the 2024 season they won the League 1 Grand Final 26–18 against Fryston Warriors and returned to the Championship in the 2025 season.

=== Wheelchair team ===
The Hull F.C. wheelchair team was established in 2013. The team competed in the National League in the 2015 season, and in the North League in 2017. In the 2019 season they reached the final of the Wheelchair Challenge Trophy and won the Championship Grand Final to earn promotion to the RFL Wheelchair Super League. In the Challenge Cup, the Hull F.C. wheelchair team has competed at the quarter-finals stage several times when it has been played as a knockout tournament. When a round-robin format was used, their best result was a third-place finish in 2023.
