= Thomas Townshend =

Thomas Townshend may refer to:

- Thomas Townshend (MP) (1701–1780), British MP
- Thomas Townshend, 1st Viscount Sydney (1733–1800), British politician, son of the above

== See also ==
- Thomas Townsend (disambiguation)
