= Joe Oliver (rugby league) =

GB & England international rugby league footballer

Personal information
- Full name: Joseph Oliver
- Born: c. 1905; Maryport, Cumbria, England
- Died: 11 June 1966 (aged 61); Hull, England

Playing information
- Position: Fullback, Centre
Club
Years	Team	Pld	T	G	FG	P
19??–2?	Huddersfield
192?–28	Batley
1928–37	Hull FC	426	152	687		1842
1938–40	Hull Kingston Rovers	34	4	36	0	84
1943–45	Hull FC
	Total	460	156	723	0	1926
Representative
Years	Team	Pld	T	G	FG	P
192?–??	Cumberland	35
1928–36	England	4	2	0	0	6
1928	Great Britain	4	1	0	0	3

Coaching information
Club
Years	Team	Gms	W	D	L	W%
1949–50	Hull FC

Joseph Oliver (c. 1905 – 11 June 1966) was an English professional rugby league footballer who played in the 1920s, 1930s and 1940s. He played at representative level for Great Britain, England and Cumberland, and at club level for Huddersfield, Batley, Hull F.C. (two spells), and Hull Kingston Rovers, as a fullback, or centre, and was captain of Hull during the 1930–31, 1933–34, 1934–35 and 1935–36 seasons.

== Background ==
Oliver was born in Maryport, Cumberland, England.

== Playing career ==
Oliver won caps for England while at Batley in 1928 against Wales, and won caps for Great Britain in 1928 against Australia (3 matches), and New Zealand.

Oliver won further caps for England while at Hull in 1933 against Australia, and in 1936 against Wales, and France. He also represented Cumberland.

Oliver played, was captain, and scored two tries, and five conversions in Hull FC's 21-2 victory over Widnes in the Championship Final during the 1935-36 season.

Oliver played, and was captain in Hull FC's victory in the Yorkshire League during the 1935-36 season.

The Hull F.C club song 'Old Faithful' also comes from Joe Oliver's time at the club. Joe was nicknamed 'The Points Machine' and 'Old Faithful' by the club's supporters, due to his consistent and prolific scoring rate. In 1933 when Gene Autry released his song about an 'old faithful' horse the fans adopted it for Joe. The song has adapted slightly since that time but can still be accredited to Joe's time at the club.

Oliver set Hull FC's "Most Career Goals" record with 687-goals, and Hull FC's "Most Career Points" record with 1842-points scored between 1928-37 & 1943-45.
