= Lawrence Townsend =

American diplomat

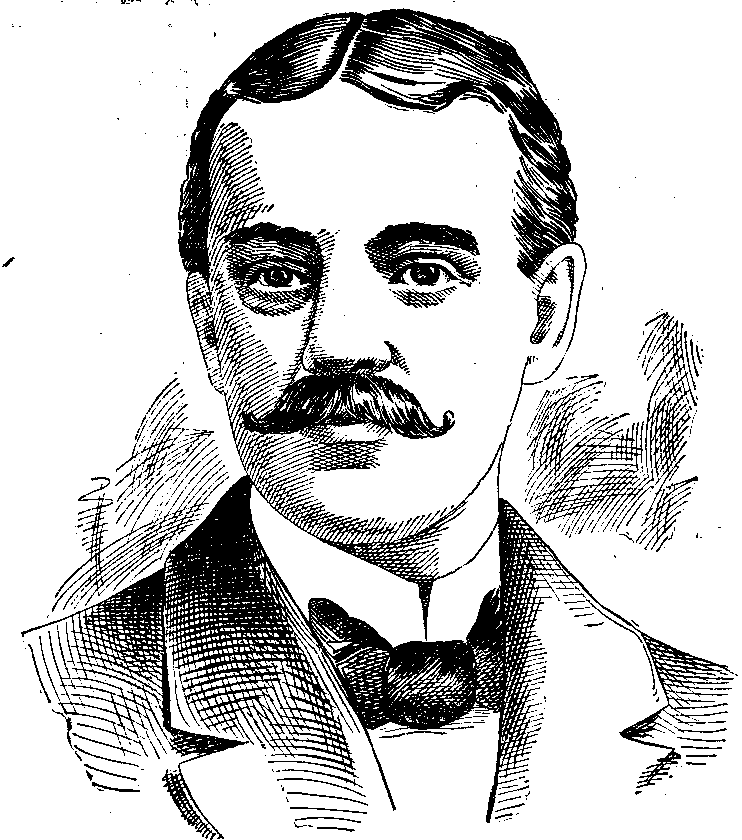

United States Minister to Belgium
- In office June 18, 1899 – May 5, 1905
- President: William McKinley; Theodore Roosevelt
- Preceded by: Bellamy Storer
- Succeeded by: Henry Lane Wilson

United States Minister to Portugal
- In office August 18, 1897 – May 29, 1899
- President: William McKinley
- Preceded by: George William Caruth
- Succeeded by: John N. Irwin

Personal details
- Born: August 13, 1860 Philadelphia, Pennsylvania
- Died: March 8, 1954 (aged 93) St. Petersburg, Florida
- Spouse: Natalie Hannau
- Education: University of Pennsylvania
- Profession: Diplomat, businessman

Lawrence Townsend (August 13, 1860 – March 8, 1954) was an American diplomat and later in life, after his retirement from government service, a business executive in Washington, DC.

== Formative years ==
Born in Philadelphia, Pennsylvania on August 13, 1860, Townsend was educated at the Mantua Academy (1872–77) and entered the University of Pennsylvania with the class of 1881. He withdrew from the university at the end of his junior year and went west to Plateau, Colorado, where he owned a large ranch (1881–1886). Returning to Pennsylvania, he married composer Natalie Hannau of Philadelphia on March 8, 1886, and they had three children: Yvonne, Lawrence Jr., and Reginald.

== Career ==
In 1889, Townsend traveled to Vienna, Austria to study law and the history of diplomacy, specializing in international law. He published numerous translations of French and German articles in his area of specialization.

From Vienna, he launched his diplomatic career. He served as First Secretary of the U.S. Legation in Vienna from 1893–97 and from there was promoted to the post of U.S. Minister to Portugal on June 9, 1897. He served in Lisbon until his transfer to Brussels on April 15, 1899, where he served as U.S. Minister to Belgium until 1905.

In 1905 he moved to Washington, D.C., and joined the Washington Gas Light Company as its treasurer and later secretary. He and his wife lived in Washington's fashionable Dupont Circle area, at 1416 20th Street, NW, and were prominent members of the Washington social and cultural scene. Later in life, Townsend became active in the English-Speaking Union.

== Death ==
Townsend died in Florida in 1954.

== Sources ==
- U.S. Department of State, Office of the Historian
- The Twentieth Century Biographical Dictionary of Notable Americans. Boston: The Biographical Society 1904
