= Robert Townshend =

Robert Townshend may refer to:

- Robert Townshend (judge) (died 1555/56), English lawyer and judge
- Robert Townshend (MP) (1580–?), English politician

== See also ==
- Robert Townsend (disambiguation)
