= Charles Townsend =

Charles Townsend may refer to:

- Charlie Townsend (1876–1958), Gloucestershire cricketer
- Charles Champlain Townsend (1841–1910), U.S. representative from Pennsylvania
- Charles E. Townsend (1856–1924), U.S. representative and senator from Michigan
- Charles E. Townsend (linguist) (1932–2015), American Slavist and linguist
- Charles Harrison Townsend (1851–1928), English architect
- Charles Haskins Townsend (1859–1944), American zoologist
- Charles Henry Tyler Townsend (1863–1944), American entomologist
- Charles Townsend (BMX rider) (born 1967), American former professional BMX racer
- Charles Townsend (fencer) (1872–1906), American fencer and Olympic silver medalist
- Chuck Townsend (Charles Townsend), Democratic politician in New Hampshire
- Charles Townsend (Ohio politician) (1834–1900), Republican politician in Ohio
- Charles Townsend (British politician), British politician of the 1890s
- Charles H. Townsend, president and CEO of the Condé Nast publishing company
- Charles Townsend, community-college instructor, see 7781 Townsend
- Charles Townsend, Wyoming state senator representing the 1st district 2003–2011
- Charles "Charlie" Townsend, fictional unseen character on the Charlie's Angels television and motion picture series
- Charles Wendell Townsend (1850–1934), American physician and ornithologist

== See also ==
- Charles Townshend (disambiguation)
