= Henry Townsend =

Henry Townsend may refer to:

- Henry Townsend (Norwich) (1626–1695), early American colonist born in Norwich, Norfolk, England
- Henry Townsend (Oyster Bay) (1649–1703), American colonist born in Oyster Bay
- Henry Townsend (missionary) (1815–1886), Anglican missionary
- Henry Townsend (musician) (1909–2006), American blues singer, guitarist and pianist

== See also ==
- Henry Townshend (disambiguation)
- Harry Everett Townsend (1879–1941), war artist for the United States Army
