= 2009 Hull FC season =

- Super League XIV Rank
- Challenge Cup
- 2009 record: draws: 0; losses: 0

Team information
- Stadium: KC Stadium
← 2008	List of seasons	2010 →

In 2009, Hull F.C. competed in their twelfth Super League season, in their 145th year after the club's foundation in 1865. They also competed in the 2009 Challenge Cup.

== Transfers ==
Transfers for 2009 (in)

	Name	Signed from	Fee	Date
(England)	Dominic Maloney	Dewsbury Rams		May 2008
(Australia)	Michael Crocker ^{†}	Melbourne Storm
(England)	Mark Calderwood	Wigan Warriors		September 2008
(England)	Chris Thorman	Huddersfield Giants		September 2008
(Tonga)	Sam Moa	Cronulla Sharks		January 2009

†: Subject to successful visa application. This process was initially delayed due to Crocker's past conviction of affray in 2005. On 29 January 2009, Hull FC confirmed Crocker's visa application had been rejected.

Transfers for 2009 (out)

Nat	Name	Moved To	Fee	Date
(England)	Scott Wheeldon	Hull Kingston Rovers		September 2008
(Wales)	Garreth Carvell	Warrington Wolves	£50,000	September 2008
(Australia)	Matt Sing	Retired		September 2008
(England)	Matty Dale	Released		September 2008
(Australia)	James Webster	Widnes Vikings		September 2008
(Australia)	Adam Dykes	Released		September 2008

== Full squad ==
Number		Player	Position	Previous club
1	(Samoa)	Motu Tony	Full back	Castleford Tigers
2	(England)	Mark Calderwood	Winger	Wigan Warriors
3	(Australia)	Todd Byrne	Centre	New Zealand Warriors
4	(England)	Kirk Yeaman	Centre	Hull
5	(England)	Gareth Raynor	Winger	Leeds Rhinos
6	(England)	Richard Horne	Stand off	Hull
7	(England)	Chris Thorman	Scrum half	Huddersfield Giants
8	(England)	Ewan Dowes	Prop	Leeds Rhinos
9	(Australia)	Shaun Berrigan	Hooker	Brisbane Broncos
10	(Australia)	Peter Cusack	Prop	South Sydney Rabbitohs
11	(England)	Lee Radford	Second row	Bradford Bulls
12	(England)	Danny Tickle	Second row	Wigan Warriors
14	(England)	Richard Whiting	Stand off	Featherstone Rovers
15	(England)	Danny Washbrook	Loose forward	Hull
16	(Tonga)	Willie Manu	Second row	Castleford Tigers
17	(England)	Graeme Horne	Second row	Hull
18	(England)	Jamie Thackray	Prop	Leeds Rhinos
19	(England)	Paul King	Prop	Hull
20	(England)	Danny Houghton	Hooker	Hull
21	(England)	Tom Briscoe	Centre	Hull
22	(England)	Mike Burnett	Second row	Hull
23	(England)	Tommy Lee	Scrum half	Hull
24	(England)	Craig Hall	Centre	Hull
25	(England)	Dominic Maloney	Prop	Dewsbury Rams
26	(England)	Josh Hodgson	Hooker	Hull
27	(Tonga)	Sam Moa	Prop	Cronulla Sharks

== Fixtures and results ==
Competition	Round	Opponent	Result	Score	Home/away	Venue	Attendance	Date
Friendly	N/A	Leeds Rhinos	Win	16–20	Away	Headingley Stadium	5,329	26/01/2009
Friendly	N/A	Dewsbury Rams	Loss	30–26	Away	The Tetley's Stadium	1,446	01/02/2009
Super League XIV	1	Wigan Warriors	Win	18–10	Home	KC Stadium	14,523	13/02/2009
Super League XIV	2	Crusaders	Win	20–28	Away	Brewery Field	5,272	21/02/2009
Super League XIV	3	Catalans Dragons	Win	28–12	Home	KC Stadium	12,482	27/02/2009
Super League XIV	4	Huddersfield Giants	Win	20–24	Away	Galpharm Stadium	10,459	06/03/2009
Super League XIV	5	Bradford Bulls	Win	24–36	Away	Grattan Stadium	11,327	15/03/2009
Super League XIV	6	Castleford Tigers	Loss	18–19	Home	KC Stadium	14,028	20/03/2009
Super League XIV	7	Harlequins RL	Loss	22–12	Away	The Twickenham Stoop	3,593	28/03/2009
Challenge Cup 2009	4	Salford City Reds	Loss	18–22	Home	KC Stadium	8,945	05/04/2009
Super League XIV	8	Hull Kingston Rovers	Loss	14–18	Home	KC Stadium	22,337	10/04/2009
Super League XIV	9	St Helens R.F.C.	Loss	44–22	Away	GPW Recruitment Stadium	13,684	13/04/2009
Super League XIV	10	Wakefield Trinity Wildcats	Loss	14–21	Home	KC Stadium	11,975	17/04/2009
Super League XIV	11	Salford City Reds	Win	14–18	Away	The Willows	4,165	25/04/2009
Super League XIV	12	Castleford Tigers	Win	24–16	Neutral	Murrayfield Stadium	30,122	03/05/2009
Super League XIV	13	Warrington Wolves	Loss	16–18	Home	KC Stadium	10,997	16/05/2009
Super League XIV	14	Leeds Rhinos	Loss	46–16	Away	Headingley Stadium	15,929	22/05/2009
Super League XIV	15	St Helens RLFC	Loss	30–6	Home	KC Stadium	12,009	05/06/2009
Super League XIV	16	Wakefield Trinity Wildcats	Loss	37–22	Away	Belle Vue	4,721	13/06/2009
Super League XIV	17	Salford City Reds	Win	14–12	Home	KC Stadium	11,218	19/06/2009
Super League XIV	18	Warrington Wolves	Loss	24–12	Away	Halliwell Jones Stadium	9,170	28/06/2009
Super League XIV	19	Leeds Rhinos	Loss	30–43	Home	KC Stadium	11,780	03/07/2009
Super League XIV	20	Castleford Tigers	Loss	40–18	Away	The Jungle	8,297	12/07/2009
Super League XIV	21	Celtic Crusaders	Win	22–6	Home	KC Stadium	10,397	17/07/2009
Super League XIV	22	Hull Kingston Rovers	Loss	24–18	Away	New Craven Park	9,450	25/07/2009
Super League XIV	23	Huddersfield Giants	Loss	0–24	Home	KC Stadium	11,191	31/07/2009
Super League XIV	24	Catalans Dragons	Loss	18–6	Away	Stade de la Méditerranée	9,800	15/08/2009
Super League XIV	25	Harlequins RL	Win	26–6	Home	KC Stadium	15,592	21/08/2009
Super League XIV	26	Wigan Warriors	Loss	34–22	Away	DW Stadium	12,491	04/09/2009
Super League XIV	27	Bradford Bulls	Loss	18–21	Home	KC Stadium	10,412	11/09/2009

== League table ==
Pos	Team	Pld	W	D	L	PF	PA	PD	Pts	Qualification
1	Leeds Rhinos (L, C)	27	21	0	6	805	453	+352	42	Play-offs
2	St Helens	27	19	0	8	733	466	+267	38	Play-offs
3	Huddersfield Giants	27	18	0	9	690	416	+274	36	Play-offs
4	Hull Kingston Rovers	27	17	1	9	650	516	+134	35	Play-offs
5	Wakefield Trinity Wildcats	27	16	0	11	685	609	+76	32	Play-offs
6	Wigan Warriors	27	15	0	12	659	551	+108	30	Play-offs
7	Castleford Tigers	27	14	0	13	645	702	−57	28	Play-offs
8	Catalans Dragons	27	13	0	14	613	660	−47	26	Play-offs
9	Bradford Bulls	27	12	1	14	653	668	−15	25	
10	Warrington Wolves	27	12	0	15	649	705	−56	24	
11	Harlequins	27	11	0	16	591	691	−100	22	
12	Hull F.C.	27	10	0	17	502	623	−121	20	
13	Salford City Reds	27	7	0	20	456	754	−298	14	
14	Celtic Crusaders	27	3	0	24	357	874	−517	6	

Source: Rugby League Project
Rules for classification: 1) Points; 2) Points difference; 3) Number of points scored;
(C) Champions; (L) League Leaders' Shield Winners
