= Matty Laidlaw =

English rugby league footballer

Personal information
- Full name: Matthew Laidlaw
- Born: 22 January 2004 (age 22) Hull, East Riding of Yorkshire, England
- Height: 6 ft 0 in (1.82 m)
- Weight: 15 st 6 lb (98 kg)

Playing information
- Position: Prop
Club
Years	Team	Pld	T	G	FG	P
2022–	Hull FC	29	0	0	0	0
2023(DR loan)	→ Newcastle Thunder	5	0	0	0	0
2023(loan)	→ Keighley Cougars	4	0	0	0	0
2025(loan)	→ Doncaster RLFC	5	0	0	0	0
2026(loan)	→ Hunslet RLFC	1	0	0	0	0
	Total	44	0	0	0	0
- Source: As of 21 October 2026

Matty Laidlaw (born 22 January 2004) is an English professional rugby league footballer who plays as a prop for Hunslet RLFC in the RFL Championship, on one-week loan from Hull FC in the Super League.

== Playing career ==
=== Hull FC ===
In 2022 he made his Hull début in the Super League against Hull Kingston Rovers.

=== Keighley Cougars (loan) ===
On 14 July 2023 he joined Keighley Cougars on loan for the rest of 2023 to gain valuable game time playing in the RFL Championship.

=== Hunslet RLFC (loan) ===
On 5 March 2026 it was reported that he had signed for Hunslet RLFC in the RFL Championship on one-month loan

On 31 July 2026 it was reported that he had returned to Hunslet RLFC for a second loan spell of one-week
