= David Townsend =

David Townsend may refer to:

- David Townsend (botanist) (1787–1858), American botanist and banker
- David Wood Townsend (1844–1912), American builder
- David Townsend (art director) (1891–1935), American art director
- David Townsend (cricketer, born 1912) (1912–1997), English cricketer
- David R. Townsend Jr. (born 1943), member of the New York State Assembly
- David Townsend (musician) (1955–2005), American musician
- David Townsend (rower) (born 1955), British rower
- David Townsend (Devon cricketer) (born 1965), former English cricketer

== See also ==
- Dave Townsend, British songwriter, lyricist, and singer
- Devin Townsend (born 1972), Canadian Progressive Metal musician
