= Lauren Townsend =

Lauren Townsend may refer to:

- Lauren Townsend (footballer) (born 1990), Welsh footballer
- Lauren Townsend (Columbine massacre victim), a victim of the Columbine high school massacre
