= Marie Townsend =

American author and composer (1851–1912)

Mary Mansfield Townsend Allen (July 16, 1851 – July 2, 1912) was an American author and composer who published her works under the names Marie Townsend and Mansfield Townsend.

Townsend was born in Canton, Pennsylvania, to Mary Ann Sharpe and Herman Townsend. She married William LeBaron Gibbs Allen on November 2, 1869, in Kidder, Missouri.

Townsend's publications include:

== Opera ==
- Hawaii

== Plays ==
- Bobs and Nabobs: A Domestic Drama in Four Acts
- Ceramics, a Summer Idyll: An Original Comedy in Five Acts

== Songs ==
- "Hammock Song"
- "Summer Days"
