= Cade Cust =

Australian rugby league footballer (born 1998)

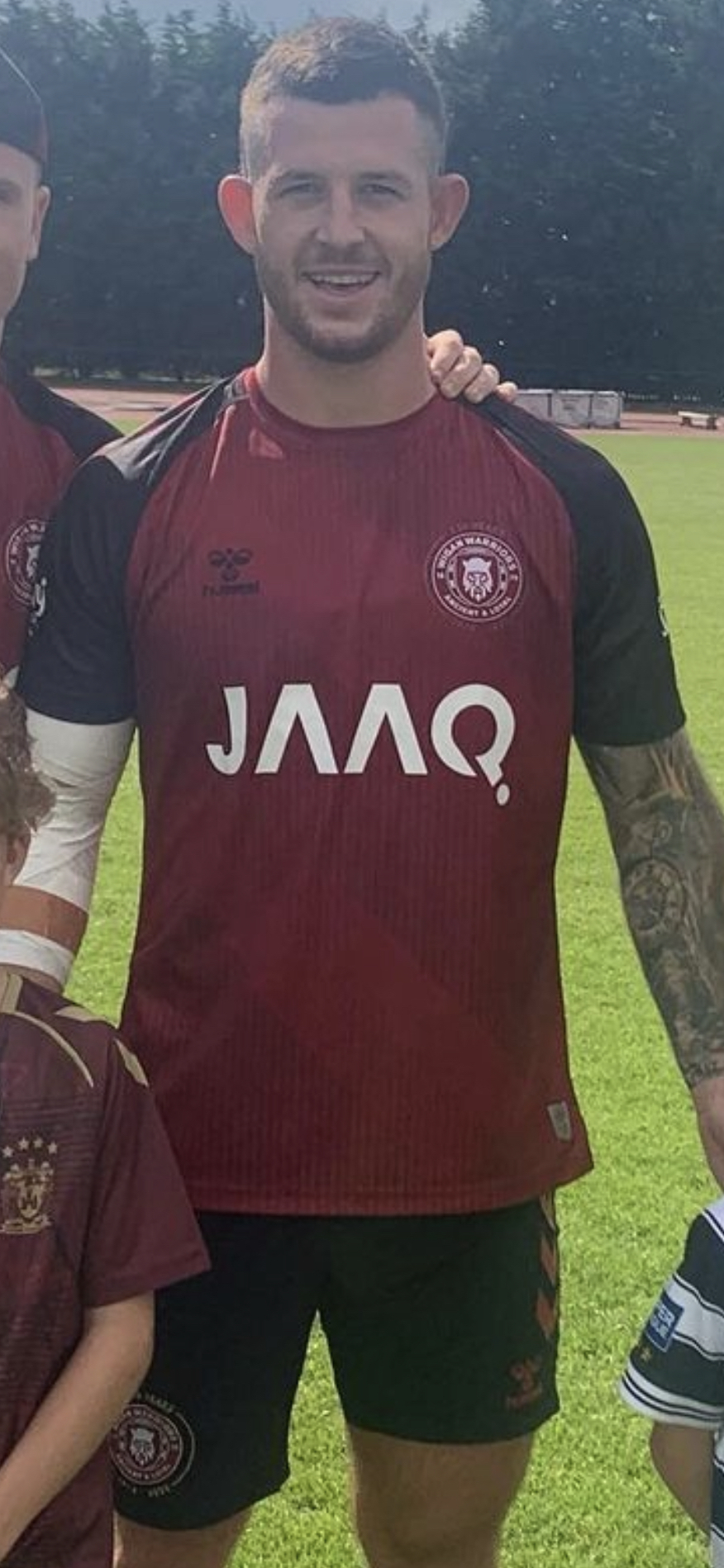

Personal information
- Full name: Cade Pennell-Cust
- Born: 14 September 1998 (age 28) Scone, New South Wales, Australia
- Height: 6 ft 0 in (1.83 m)
- Weight: 14 st 2 lb (90 kg)

Playing information
- Position: Stand-off, Hooker
Club
Years	Team	Pld	T	G	FG	P
2019–21	Manly Sea Eagles	27	9	0	0	36
2022–23	Wigan Warriors	40	6	0	0	24
2024	Salford Red Devils	13	1	0	0	4
2025–	Hull F.C.	49	14	0	0	56
	Total	129	30	0	0	120
Representative
Years	Team	Pld	T	G	FG	P
2021	Indigenous All Stars	1	0	0	0	0
- Source: As of 27 August 2025

Cade Cust (born 14 September 1998) is an Australian professional rugby league footballer who plays as a stand-off or hooker for Hull F.C. in the Super League.

He previously played for the Manly Warringah Sea Eagles in the National Rugby League, Wigan Warriors and the Salford Red Devils in the Super League.

== Background ==
Cust was born in Scone, New South Wales, Australia. He is of Aboriginal descent.

Cust was a Scone Thoroughbreds junior.

== Playing career ==
=== Blacktown Workers Sea Eagles ===
At the start of the 2019 NRL season, Cust played in the Canterbury Cup NSW for Manly's feeder club side the Blacktown Workers Sea Eagles.

=== Manly Warringah ===
In Round 10 2019, Cust made his NRL debut for Manly Warringah against the Cronulla-Sutherland Sharks at Shark Park. Cust scored his first try for Manly in Round 12 2019 against Penrith at Penrith Park in which Manly lost the match 15-12.

Cust was limited to only ten games for Manly in the 2021 NRL season. He did not play in the club's finals campaign which saw Manly reach the preliminary final.

=== Wigan ===
On 12 November 2021, Cust signed a two-year deal with English side Wigan. In round 1 of the 2022 Super League season, Cust made his club debut for Wigan in a 24-10 victory over Hull Kingston Rovers. On 28 May 2022, he played for Wigan in their 2022 Challenge Cup Final victory over Huddersfield. In round 24 of the 2022 Super League season, Cust scored two tries in a 52-6 victory over Toulouse Olympique. Cust played 14 games for Wigan in the 2023 Super League season. Cust did not play in Wigan's 2023 Super League Grand Final victory over the Catalans Dragons.

=== Salford Red Devils ===
On 24 October 2023 it was reported that he had signed for Salford Red Devils for 2024

=== Hull F.C. ===
On 11 October 2024, it was reported that he had signed for Hull F.C. on a two-year deal. In round 1 of the 2025 Super League season, Cust scored two tries on debut for Hull F.C. in their upset victory over Catalans Dragons. In round 8 of the 2025 Super League season, Cust was given a straight red card in the first half of Hull F.C.'s match against arch-rivals Hull Kingston Rovers. Hull F.C. would lose the match 28-14. Cust played 26 games for Hull F.C. in the 2025 Super League season as the club finished 7th on the table.

== Honours ==
=== Wigan Warriors ===
- Super League
  - Winners (1): 2023
- League Leaders' Shield
  - Winners (1): 2023
- Challenge Cup
  - Winners (1): 2022
