= Harvie Hill =

English rugby league footballer

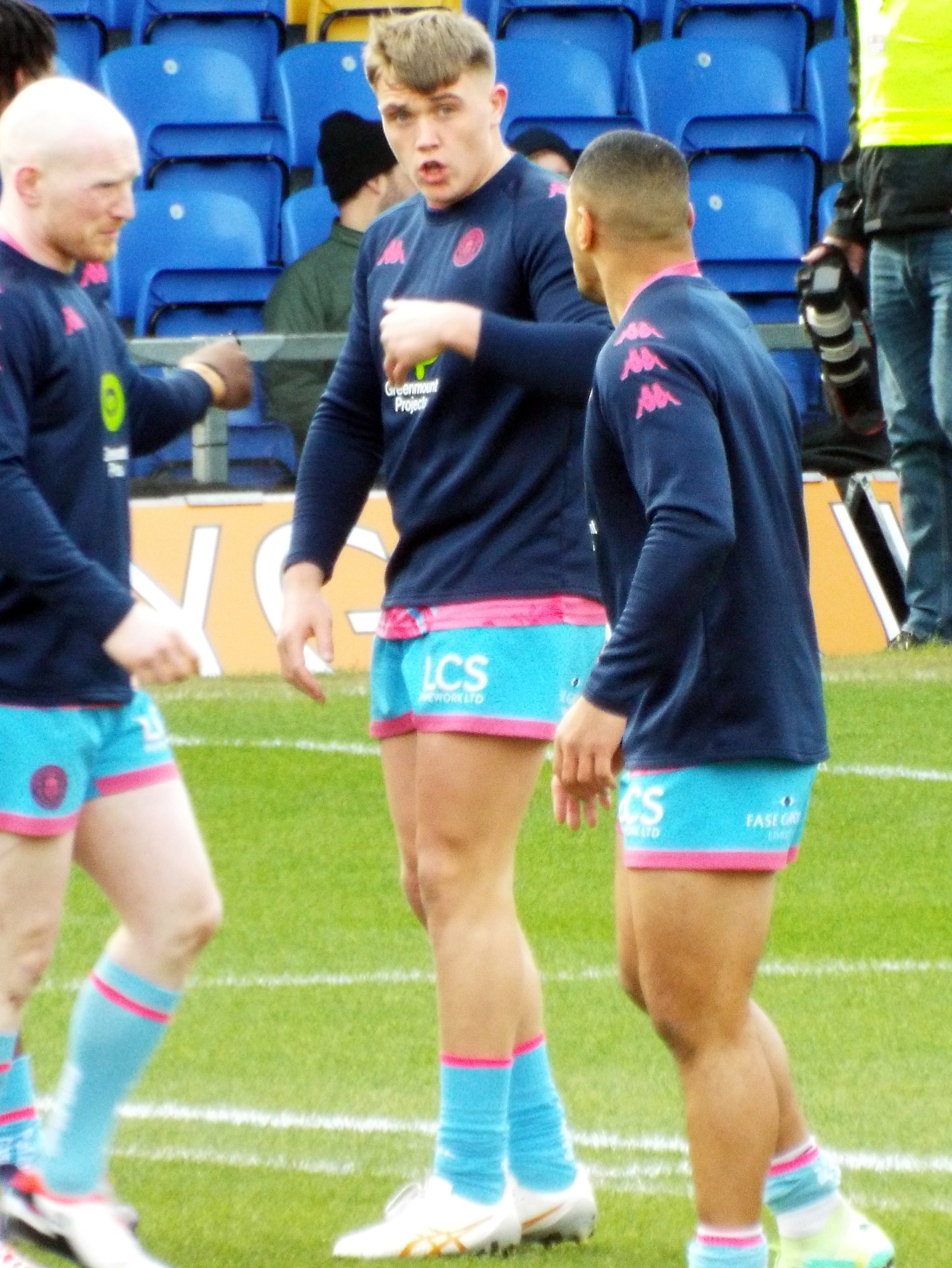

Personal information
- Full name: Harvie Hill
- Born: 3 September 2003 (age 22) Whitehaven, Cumbria, England
- Height: 6 ft 2 in (1.88 m)
- Weight: 18 st 2 lb (115 kg)

Playing information
- Position: Prop
Club
| Years | Team | Pld | T | G | FG | P |
|---|---|---|---|---|---|---|
| 2022–25 | Wigan Warriors | 19 | 2 | 0 | 0 | 8 |
| 2023(loan) | → London Broncos | 4 | 0 | 0 | 0 | 0 |
| 2023(loan) | → Toulouse Olympique | 2 | 0 | 0 | 0 | 0 |
| 2026– | Hull FC | 26 | 2 | 0 | 0 | 8 |
| | Total | 51 | 4 | 0 | 0 | 16 |
Representative
| Years | Team | Pld | T | G | FG | P |
| 2025 | Cumbria | 0 | 0 | 0 | 0 | 0 |
- Source: As of 31 October 2025

Harvie Hill (born 3 September 2003) is an English professional rugby league footballer who plays as a prop for Hull FC in the Super League.

== Playing career ==
=== Wigan Warriors ===
In 2022 Hill made his Super League début for Wigan against Hull Kingston Rovers. On 24 February 2024, Hill played in Wigan's 2024 World Club Challenge final victory over Penrith.

=== London Broncos (loan) ===
On 10 February 2023 it was announced he would join the London Broncos on an initial one month loan.

== Personal ==
He is the son of former Oldham and Whitehaven player Howard Hill.

== Honours ==
=== Wigan Warriors ===
- Super League
  - Winners (1): 2024
- League Leaders' Shield
  - Winners (1): 2024
- Challenge Cup
  - Winners (1): 2024
