= Charles Wendell Townsend =

Naturalist, ornithologist, author and physician

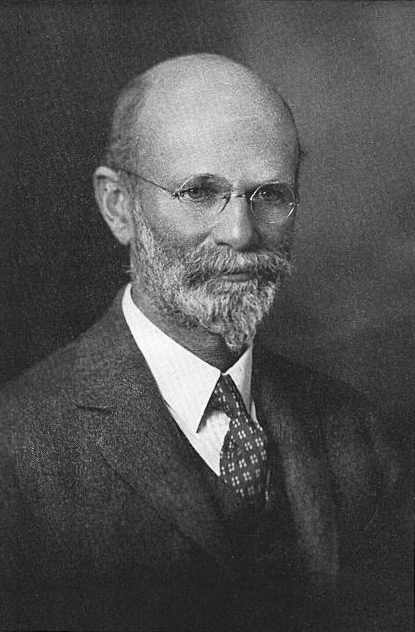

Charles Wendell Townsend (November 10, 1859 - April 3, 1934) was an American obstetric and pediatric physician while also being an amateur ornithologist. He was a member of the American Ornithologists' Union and several other ornithological societies.

== Life and work ==
Townsend was born in Boston to Thomas Davis and Frances Barnard (Smith). He became interested in birds while at Harvard College. He became a member of the Nuttall Ornithological Club in 1877 and along with his brother William he collected birds and eggs. His first note was on the capture of a lark sparrow by his brother in Massachusetts. After graduating in 1881 he went to study medicine following the tradition of his family. His grandfather Solomon Davis Townsend was a surgeon as was his great-grandfather David Townsend who served in the American Revolution. He entered school in 1881 and graduated from the Harvard Medical School in 1885. He specialized in obstetrics and pediatrics. He married Gertrude Flint in 1891 and established a private practice in Boston. He bought a summer home in Ipswich, Massachusetts where he studied the birds of the region. He published a book on the Birds of Essex County (1905). In 1907 he published a book Along the Labrador Coast dealing with the birdlife and in 1909 he visited Quebec and the Gulf of St. Lawrence along with Arthur C. Bent. He made yet another visit with Dr Harold St. John. In 1917 he stopped his medical practice following the death of his wife and settled in Ipswich. He married his sister-in-law Sarah G. Flint (d. 1924) in 1919. He travelled to Japan, China and Indonesia in 1926–27. The next year he travelled to the Panama Canal and along the coast of South America. In 1931-32 he travelled around Africa. At the time of his death he was director of the Massachusetts Audubon Society and a member of the Cooper Ornithological Club, the Wilson Ornithological Club, and the Deutsche Ornithologische Gesellschaft. He died from a carcinoma of the stomach.
