= John Townshend =

John Townshend may refer to:

- Sir John Townshend (died 1603) (1560s–1603), MP and soldier, ancestor of the Marquesses Townshend, killed in a duel
- Lord John Townshend (1757–1833), British Whig politician, MP for Cambridge University, Westminster and Knaresborough
- John Townshend, 4th Marquess Townshend (1798–1863), his son, British naval commander
- John Townshend, 5th Marquess Townshend (1831–1899), his son, British peer and Liberal MP for Tamworth, 1856–1863
- John Townshend, 6th Marquess Townshend (1866–1921), his son, British peer
- John Townshend, 2nd Viscount Sydney (1764–1831), British peer
- John Townshend, 1st Earl Sydney (1805–1890), his son, MP for Whitchurch, 1826–1831, Lord Chamberlain and Lord Steward
- John Townshend (cook), author of The Universal Cook

== See also ==
- John Townend (1934–2018), British politician
- John Townsend (disambiguation)
