= Leslie Townsend =

Leslie Townsend may refer to:

- Leslie Townsend (cricketer) (1903–1993), English cricketer
- Leslie Townsend (Royal Navy officer) (1924–1999), Defence Services Secretary, 1979–1982
