= Robert Townsend =

Robert Townsend may refer to:

- Robert Townsend (spy) (1753–1838), American spy
- Robert Townsend (captain) (1819–1866), United States Navy
- Robert Townsend (author) (1920–1998), American author, CEO of Avis Rent a Car
- Ed Townsend (swimmer) (Robert Edward Townsend Jr., born 1943), American swimmer
- Rob Townsend (born 1947), English rock drummer
- Robert M. Townsend (born 1948), professor of economics at MIT
- Robert Townsend (actor) (born 1957), American actor, comedian and filmmaker

== See also ==
- Robert Townshend (disambiguation)
