= James Townsend =

James or Jim Townsend may refer to:

- James Townsend (New Zealand settler) (1790–1866), English cricketer, wine merchant and settler in New Zealand's South Island
- James Townsend (British politician) (1737–1787), Lord Mayor of London 1772
- James Townsend (New York politician) (1729–1790), U.S. Congressman-elect from New York
- James Townsend (Oklahoma politician), member of the Oklahoma House of Representatives
- James Townsend (psychologist) (born 1939), mathematical psychologist
- Jim Townsend (footballer) (1945–2020), Scottish footballer (Heart of Midlothian FC)
- Jim Townsend (Irish politician) (1937–2021), member of the Irish Senate
- Jim Townsend (Michigan politician), member of the Michigan House of Representatives
- James William Emery Townsend (1838–1900), better known as Lying Jim Townsend, American storyteller
- James Townsend Saward (1798–?), English forger
- James Matthew Townsend (1841–1913), African Methodist Episcopal minister and state legislator from Indiana
- James G. Townsend, politician in New Mexico
- James Robert Townsend, American patent attorney

== See also ==
- Lord James Townshend (1785–1842), British naval commander and Tory politician
