= Joe Batchelor =

England international rugby league footballer

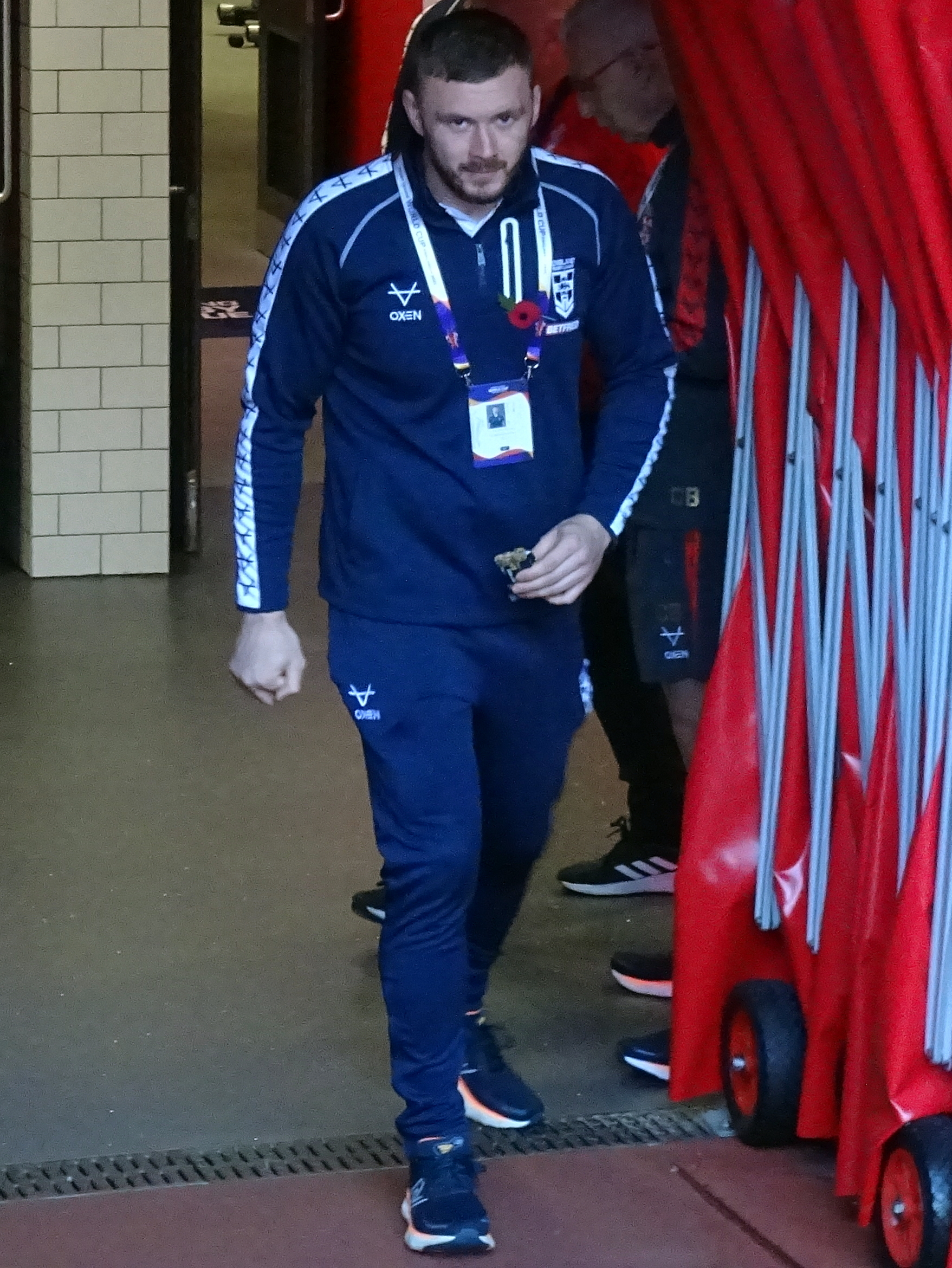

Personal information
- Full name: Joe Batchelor
- Born: 28 October 1994 (age 32) Wakefield, West Yorkshire, England
- Height: 6 ft 1 in (1.85 m)
- Weight: 15 st 6 lb (98 kg)

Playing information
- Position: Second-row
Club
Years	Team	Pld	T	G	FG	P
2016	Coventry Bears	11	4	0	0	16
2017–18	York City Knights	48	38	0	0	152
2019–25	St Helens	112	24	0	0	104
2019(loan)	→ York City Knights	11	8	0	0	32
2019(loan)	→ Leigh Centurions	6	0	0	0	0
2026–	Hull FC	19	7	0	0	28
	Total	207	81	0	0	332
Representative
Years	Team	Pld	T	G	FG	P
2022	England	1	1	0	0	4
- Source: As of 10 October 2025
- Relatives: James Batchelor (brother)

Joe Batchelor (born 28 October 1994) is an English professional rugby league footballer who plays as a second-row forward for Hull FC in the Super League and England at international level.

He has played for the Coventry Bears and the York City Knights in League 1. Batchelor has spent time on loan from Saints at York and the Leigh Centurions in the Betfred Championship. From 2026 he will play for Hull F.C. after signing a three-year deal with the club.

== Background ==
Born in Wakefield, West Yorkshire, England, Batchelor played junior rugby league with Dewsbury Celtic.

He is the brother of James Batchelor who plays for Hull KR in the Super League.

== Playing career ==
=== Early career ===
Batchelor started his career as an academy player at Sheffield Eagles. In 2015, he spent a year in Australia, where he played for Bathurst St Patrick's in the Group 10 Rugby League competition. He returned to the Eagles in 2016, but the club's reserve team was discontinued shortly afterwards. After contacting Coventry Bears coach Tom Tsang, he agreed to join the club, and made his professional debut in May 2016 against Doncaster.

=== York City Knights ===
In December 2016, York City Knights announced that they had signed Batchelor. He debuted for the club in a Challenge Cup match against Egremont Rangers, scoring a try in a 48–8 win. He scored 15 tries in 21 appearances in his first season at the club, and was named as the York Press Player of the Year for 2017. Despite attracting interest from other clubs, he agreed to sign a new contract with York for the following season. In the 2018 season, he was the club's top try scorer with 23 tries in 27 games, helping the club win promotion to the Championship.

=== St Helens ===
In May 2018, Batchelor agreed to join Super League side St Helens, signing a three-year contract with the club ahead of the 2019 season. During his first season at the club, he returned to York City Knights on loan. The initial one-month loan was extended for the whole season, but Saints exercised the option to recall him. He made his Super League debut for St Helens against Hull in April 2019. Later in the season, he also played for Leigh Centurions on a dual registration deal. Batchelor's first team opportunities at St Helens were limited, and he made only eight appearances during his first two seasons at the club.

His breakthrough came in the 2021 season, becoming a regular starter in the second-row for the club following the departures of Zeb Taia and Dom Peyroux. On 17 July 2021, he played for St Helens in their 26–12 win against Castleford Tigers in the 2021 Challenge Cup Final. In August 2021, Batchelor extended his contract with Saints until the end of the 2023 season. On 9 October 2021, he played for St Helens in their 12–10 victory over Catalans Dragons in the 2021 Super League Grand Final. On 24 September 2022, Batchelor played for St Helens in their 2022 Super League Grand Final victory over Leeds Rhinos, and was rewarded with a further contract extension until 2025. He played 15 games for St Helens in the 2023 Super League season as the club finished third on the table. Batchelor played 17 matches for St Helens in the 2024 Super League season which saw the club finish sixth on the table. Batchelor played in St Helens golden point extra-time playoff loss against Warrington.

=== Hull FC ===
On 16 September 2025, it was announced that Batchelor would be departing St Helens at the end of the 2025 Super League season. On the same day, it was revealed he had signed a contract to join Hull F.C. starting in 2026.

=== England ===
Batchelor was one of five St Helens players selected by England in the squad for the 2021 Rugby League World Cup.
