= Charles Townshend (disambiguation) =

Charles Townshend (1725–1767) was a British Chancellor of the Exchequer.

Charles Townshend may also refer to:

- Charles Fox Townshend (1795–1817), founder of the Eton Society
- Charles Townshend, 3rd Viscount Townshend (1700–1764), father of the Chancellor
- Charles Townshend, 2nd Viscount Townshend (1674–1738), known as Turnip Townshend, grandfather of the Chancellor
- Lord Charles Townshend (1769–1796), son of the 1st Marquess Townshend, British MP for Great Yarmouth
- Lord Charles Townshend (1785–1853), son of the 2nd Marquess Townshend, British MP for Tamworth
- Sir Charles Townshend (British Army officer) (1861–1924), British Army officer and politician
- Charles Townshend (historian) (born 1945), British historian
- Charles Townshend, 1st Baron Bayning (1728–1810), British politician, cousin of the Chancellor
- Charles Townshend, 2nd Baron Bayning (1785–1823), British peer and Tory member of parliament
- Charles Townshend, 8th Marquess Townshend (born 1945)
- Sir Charles James Townshend (1844–1924), judge and chief justice of Nova Scotia, MP for Cumberland

== See also ==
- Charles Townsend (disambiguation)
