= Robert Townson =

Robert Townson may refer to:

- Robert Tounson (1575–1621), or Townson, Dean of Westminster, and later Bishop of Salisbury
- Robert Townson (natural historian) (1762–1827), English natural historian and traveller
