= Taylor Townsend (disambiguation) =

Taylor Townsend (born 1996) is an American tennis player.

Taylor Townsend may also refer to:

- Taylor Townsend (The O.C.), fictional character on the FOX television series The O.C., played by Autumn Reeser
- Taylor Townsend (politician) (born 1963), American politician
