= Connor Bailey =

English rugby league footballer (born 2000)

Personal information
- Born: 10 October 2000 (age 25) Wakefield, West Yorkshire, England
- Height: 6 ft 2 in (1.88 m)
- Weight: 14 st 13 lb (95 kg)

Playing information
- Position: Stand-off, Scrum-half, Second-row
Club
Years	Team	Pld	T	G	FG	P
2020–21	Wakefield Trinity	5	0	0	0	0
2021(loan)	→ Newcastle Thunder	18	6	0	0	0
2022–23	Newcastle Thunder	25	2	0	0	8
2024–25	York Knights	60	19	0	0	76
2026–	Hull F.C.	0	0	0	0	0
	Total	108	27	0	0	84
- Source: As of 6 September 2026

Connor Bailey (born 10 October 2000) is a professional rugby league footballer who plays as a stand-off, scrum-half or second-row forward for Hull FC in the Super League.

== Career ==
=== 2020 ===
Bailey made his Super League debut in round 12 of the 2020 Super League season for Wakefield against Hull FC.

=== Newcastle Thunder (loan) ===
On 5 Dec 2020 it was reported that he had signed for the Newcastle Thunder on season-long loan.

=== Newcastle Thunder ===
On 10 November 2021, it was reported that he had signed for Newcastle Thunder in the RFL Championship.

=== York Knights ===
On 27 October 2023, it was announced that Bailey had signed a two-year deal with the York Knights.

=== Hull FC ===
On 12 September 2025 it was reported that he had signed for Hull FC in the Super League on a 2-year deal.
