= Logan Moy =

English professional rugby league footballer

Personal information
- Full name: Logan Moy
- Born: 10 August 2005 (age 20) Hull, East Riding of Yorkshire, England
- Height: 5 ft 9 in (1.75 m)
- Weight: 12 st 2 lb (77 kg)

Playing information
- Position: Fullback, Wing
Club
Years	Team	Pld	T	G	FG	P
2024–	Hull FC	26	3	0	0	12
2025(loan)	→ Doncaster RLFC	7	3	0	0	12
2026(loan)	→ Halifax Panthers	1	0	0	0	0
	Total	34	6	0	0	24
- Source: As of 19 April 2026

Logan Moy (born 10 August 2005) is an English professional rugby league footballer who plays as a fullback or winger for Hull FC in the Betfred Super League.

He previously spent time on loan from Hull at Doncaster in the RFL Championship.

== Background ==
Moy was born in Kingston upon Hull, East Riding of Yorkshire, England. He attended Malet Lambert School.

He played for the Skirlaugh Bulls as a junior. Moy joined FC's Academy system in 2022 and was the Academy player of the year in 2023.

== Career ==
=== Hull FC ===
Moy moved into the Hull FC first team squad ahead of the 2024 season. He made his professional debut for Hull FC in April 2024 against the Huddersfield Giants in the Super League. He signed a three-year contract extension with Hull in May 2024.

=== Doncaster RLFC (loan) ===
Moy spent time in 2025 on loan from Hull FC at Doncaster RLFC in the Championship.

=== Halifax Panthers (loan) ===
On 6 March 2026 it was reported that he had signed for Halifax Panthers in the RFL Championship on short-term loan
