= Hugo Salabio =

France international rugby league footballer

Personal information
- Full name: Hugo Salabio
- Born: 27 July 2000 (age 26) Marseille, Bouches-du-Rhône; Provence-Alpes-Côte d'Azur, France
- Height: 6 ft 4 in (1.92 m)
- Weight: 16 st 5 lb (104 kg)

Playing information
- Position: Prop
Club
Years	Team	Pld	T	G	FG	P
2018–22	Saint-Estève XIII Catalan	41	3	0	0	12
2021	Toulouse Olympique	2	0	0	0	0
2022	Catalans Dragons	1	0	0	0	0
2023	Baroudeurs de Pia XIII	12	0	0	0	0
2023	Wakefield Trinity	3	0	0	0	0
2024	Huddersfield Giants	12	0	0	0	0
2025–26	Hull FC	18	0	0	0	0
2025(DR)	→ Doncaster	2	0	0	0	0
2025(loan)	→ Castleford Tigers	5	0	0	0	0
2026(loan)	→ Halifax Panthers	9	0	0	0	0
2027–	Leeds Rhinos	0	0	0	0	0
	Total	105	3	0	0	12
Representative
Years	Team	Pld	T	G	FG	P
2024	France	1	0	0	0	0
- Source: As of 20 October 2026

Hugo Salabio (born 27 July 2000) is a French professional rugby league footballer who plays as a prop forward for Leeds Rhinos in the Super League and France at international level.

He has previously played for the Catalans Dragons, Wakefield Trinity and the Huddersfield Giants in the Super League and for Toulouse Olympique in the Championship.

== Playing career ==
=== Catalans Dragons ===
In 2022, he made his Catalans debut in the Super League against the Wigan Warriors.

=== Pia Donkeys ===
He joined Pia in the Elite One Championship before joining Wakefield Trinity in June 2023.

=== Wakefield Trinity ===
In round 15 of the 2023 Super League season, on his Wakefield debut Salabio was given a red card for a dangerous lifting tackle on Leeds player Richie Myler during Wakefield Trinity's 24-14 victory. It was Wakefield's first victory of the campaign having lost their opening 14 matches.

On 13 June 2023, Salabio was suspended for seven games over the incident and fined £1,000.

=== Huddersfield Giants ===
On 12 October 2023, it was reported that he had signed with Huddersfield for the 2024 season on a three-year deal.

=== Hull F.C. ===
On 22 December 2024, it was reported that he had signed for Hull F.C. in the Super League on a two-year deal. On 28 August 2026, it was announced that Salabio would leaving Hull F.C. at the end of the 2026 Super League season after not being offered a new contract.

==== Doncaster RLFC (DR) ====
On 21 March 2025 it was reported that he had signed for Doncaster RLFC in the RFL Championship on DR loan

==== Castleford Tigers (loan) ====
On 15 April 2025, Castleford Tigers announced the signing of Salabio on a season-long loan deal, with Hull holding a two-week recall option. He made his Castleford debut on 17 April 2025 in the Round 8 game against Wakefield Trinity. Salabio made five appearances for the Tigers before he was recalled by Hull FC on 9 September 2025.

==== Halifax Panthers (loan) ====
On 6 March 2026 it was reported that he had signed for Halifax Panthers in the RFL Championship on short-term loan

=== Leeds Rhinos ===
On 20 October 2026 it was reported that he had signed for Leeds Rhinos in the Super League on a 1-year deal.
