= Charles Townend =

English rugby league footballer

Personal information
- Full name: Charles Townend
- Born: unknown
- Died: unknown

Playing information
Club
Years	Team	Pld	T	G	FG	P
1895–97	Hull FC

Charles "Charlie" Townend (birth unknown – death unknown) was an English professional rugby league footballer who played in the 1890s. He played at club level for Hull FC, and was captain of Hull during the 1896–97 season.
