= Chris Townsend =

Chris Townsend may refer to:

- Chris Townsend (writer) (born 1949), hillwalker and author
- Chris Townsend (commercial director), commercial director at the London 2012 Organising Committee
- Chris Townsend (footballer) (born 1966), Welsh former footballer
- Chris Townsend (cricketer) (born 1972), English educator and former cricketer

== See also ==
- Christopher Townsend, visual effects supervisor
