= Tausend (surname) =

Tausend is a German surname ('thousand'). Notable people with the surname include:

- Claudia Tausend (born 1964), German politician
- Franz Tausend (1884–1942), German alchemist

== See also ==
- Townsend (surname)
