= Ethan O'Neill =

Australian professional rugby league footballer

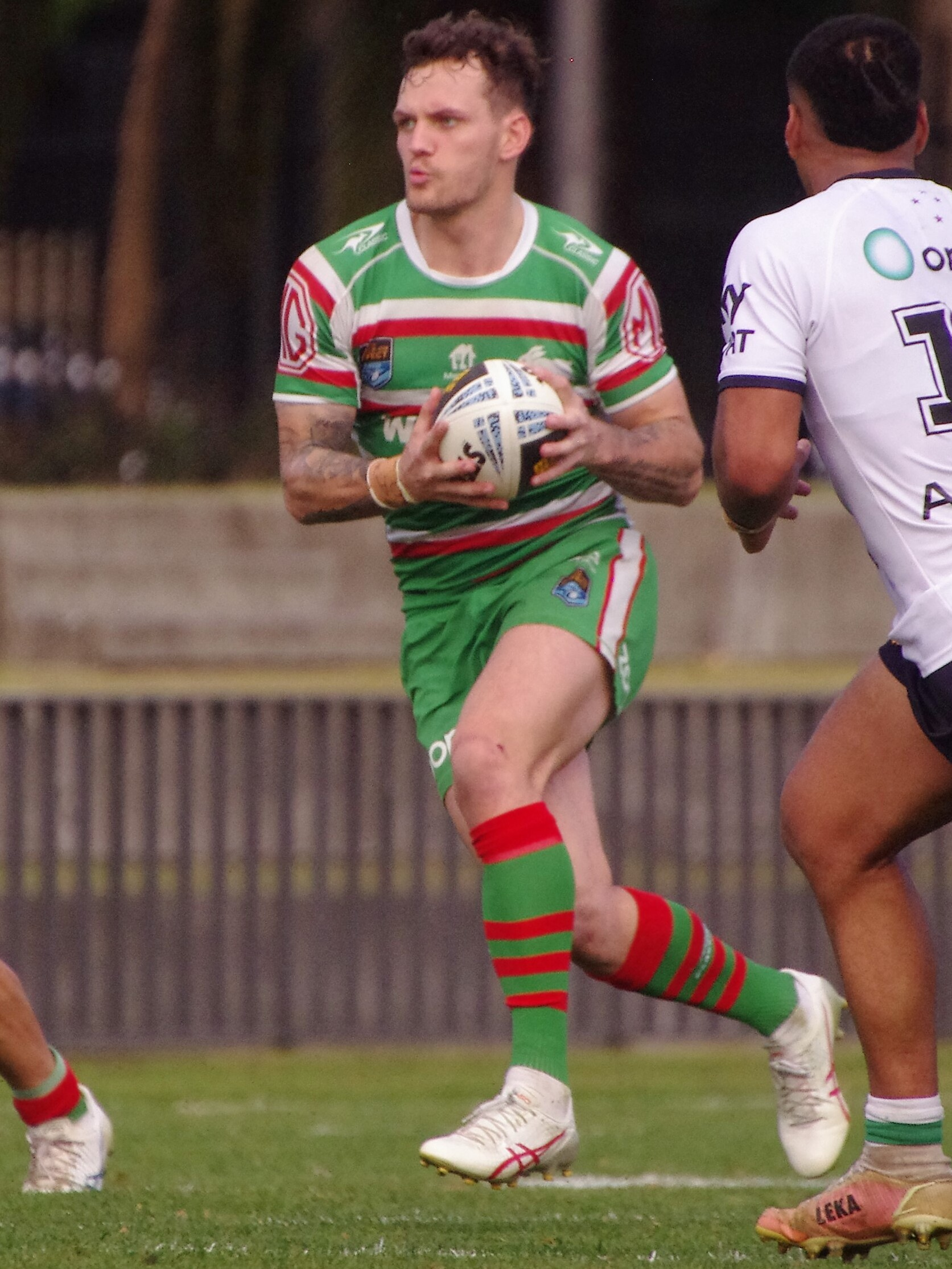

Personal information
- Full name: Ethan O'Neill
- Born: 1 June 1999 (age 27) Sydney, New South Wales, Australia
- Height: 6 ft 3 in (1.90 m)
- Weight: 15 st 8 lb (99 kg)

Playing information
- Position: Second-row
Club
Years	Team	Pld	T	G	FG	P
2025	Leigh Leopards	22	7	0	0	28
2026	Leeds Rhinos	4	0	0	0	0
2026(loan)	→ Hull FC	5	2	0	0	8
2026–	Hull FC	10	1	0	0	4
	Total	41	10	0	0	40
- Source: As of 16 November 2026
- Father: Julian O'Neill

Ethan O'Neill (born 1 June 1999) is an Australian professional rugby league footballer who plays as a second-row forward for Hull FC in the Betfred Super League.

He has previously played for the Leigh Leopards in the Super League. O'Neill was contracted to the South Sydney Rabbitohs and the Brisbane Broncos in the NRL. He has also played for the Tweed Heads Seagulls, Central Queensland Capras and the Burleigh Bears in the Queensland Cup, as well as South Sydney in the New South Wales Cup. He played as a centre earlier in his career.

== Background ==
O'Neill was born in Randwick, in the Eastern Suburbs of Sydney, New South Wales, Australia. He grew up in Maroubra, New South Wales and in Widnes, Cheshire, England. He is the son of former professional rugby league footballer Julian O'Neill.

He played for the Clovelly Crocodiles as a junior where he was coached by his future Leigh coach Adrian Lam. He progressed through the Sydney Roosters junior system, playing in their Harold Matthews, SG Ball and Jersey Flegg sides between 2015 and 2019.

O'Neill played for the Queensland under-16 team.

== Career ==
O'Neill played in the Roosters under 20s side in 2018 and 2019 before moving to the Tweed Heads Seagulls ahead of the 2021 Queensland Cup season.

He made his debut in March 2021 for the Tweed Seagulls against the Wynnum Manly Seagulls in the Queensland Cup. He played 4 games for the Tweed before leaving for the Central Queensland Capras.

O'Neill made his Capras debut in July 2021. He played 25 games over the course of a one and a half year stay at Browne Park, before returning to New South Wales to join the Rabbitohs ahead of the 2023 NSW Cup season.

He played in a NRL trial match for the South Sydney Rabbitohs in February 2023. O'Neill played 25 games over the course of the season and in September 2023 won the 2023 NSW Cup Grand Final with victory over the North Sydney Bears. In October 2023 he scored a try in winning the 2023 NRL State Championship, with victory over the Brisbane Tigers.

=== Brisbane Broncos ===
After a highly successful 2023 O'Neill moved to the Brisbane Broncos in the National Rugby League. He featured in one NRL trial match in 2024, but did not play in first-grade.

He spent all of the 2025 season playing in the Queensland Cup for the Burleigh Bears, as a contracted player with the Brisbane Broncos.

=== Leigh Leopards ===
O'Neill joined the Leigh Leopards in the Super League on a two-year deal ahead of the 2025 Super League season.

=== Leeds Rhinos ===
He left the Leopards to join the Leeds Rhinos ahead of the 2026 Super League season.

=== Hull FC (loan) ===
On 10 May 2026 it was reported that he had signed for Hull FC in the Super League on loan

=== Hull FC ===
On 9 July 2026 it was reported that he had made the move to Hull FC permanent, with his immediate release from Leeds Rhinos confirmed
