= Henry Townshend =

Henry Townshend may refer to:

- Henry Townshend (died 1621) (1537–1621), MP for Bridgnorth and Ludlow
- Henry Townshend (died 1762) (1736–1762), MP for Eye
- Henry Dive Townshend (1796–1882), British Army officer
- Henry Townshend (Silent Hill), character in Silent Hill 4: The Room

== See also ==
- Henry Townsend (disambiguation)
