= Natalie Townsend =

American composer

Natalie Hannau Townsend (1866 – July 26, 1962) was an American composer who was also known for organizing musicales in Washington, D.C.. She is listed in some sources as Pearl Dea Etta Townsend, and sometimes published her music as Madame Lawrence Townsend.

Townsend was born in France to American parents. She came to the United States in 1881. On March 8, 1886, she married Lawrence Townsend, who served as an American minister to Belgium from 1899 to 1905. They had three children, Yvonne, Lawrence Jr., and Reginald. She studied voice with Jean de Reszke and Burton Thatcher.

After returning from Belgium, the Townsends lived at 1416 20th Street NW, Washington, D.C. Townsend organized at least 123 musicales over 19 years at the Mayflower Hotel in Washington, D.C., and in private homes. The musicales included performances by Mario Basiola, Lucrezia Bori, Frederick Bristol, Eddy Brown, Anna Case, Richard Crooks, Yelly d'Aranyi, André D'Arkor, Giuseppe De Luca, Beniamino Gigli, Robert Goldsand, Louis Graveure, Rudolph Gruen, Myra Hess, Carroll Hollister, José Iturbi, Hans Kindler, Paul Kochanski, Frank La Forge, Lotte Lehmann, Lauritz Melchior, Grace Moore, Guiomar Novaes, Maria Olszewska, Emma Otero, Milan V. Petrovic, Rosa Ponsell, Alberto Salvi, Harry R. Spier, Grete Stueckgold, Conchita Supervia, Nina Verez-Dansereau, and Carlo Zecchi. Programs from Townsend's musicales are archived at the Library of Congress.

The Townsends also had a home in St. Petersburg, Florida, where Natalie Townsend died in 1962.

Commercial recordings of Townsend's music include:

- Columbia A-1766
- NAXOS Historical 8.112055
- Victor B-12727
- Victor B-15418
- Victor 64319

Townsend's music was published by Chappell & Co., G. Schirmer, Inc., Le Figaro, and Casa Ricordi. Her compositions include:

== Chamber ==
- Berceuse, opus 9 (violin and piano)

== Piano ==
- Aubade Printaniere (Chattering Birds) (for one or two pianos)
- Sandringham March

== Vocal ==
- "Belgium Forever!" (text by Yvonne Townsend)
- "Forward, Belgium"
- "Petite Pensee"
- "Spanish Girl's Love Song" (text by Helen Huntington)
- "Spirit of Liberty: A Patriotic Marching Song" (text by Yvonne Townsend)
- "Thought of You" (text by Helen Huntington)
- "Two French Songs" (text by Victor Hugo and L. Montenaken)
- "Vous!...Toi!" (text by Arturo Fabricotti)

Download free sheet music for Berceuse opus 9 by Natalie Townsend
