= Bruce C. Townsend =

American politician

Member of the New Hampshire House of Representatives from the Grafton 14th district
- In office 1974–1976

Personal details
- Party: Republican

Bruce C. Townsend is an American politician. He served as a Republican member for the Grafton 14th district of the New Hampshire House of Representatives.
