= Thomas Townsend =

Thomas Townsend may refer to:

- Captain Thomas Townsend, early settler of the American Colonies
- T. B. Townsend (Thomas Burgess Townsend), American brick manufacturer, building contractor, and cattle rancher
- Thomas Townsend (bishop), Irish Anglican bishop
- Thomas Townsend (Iowa politician), electrician and politician from Iowa
- Thomas J. Townsend, surveyor, ferry operator, politician, and emigration agent from Wisconsin
- Thomas Scott Townsend (1812–1869), land surveyor in the colony of New South Wales (now Australia)
- Tom Townsend, English bridge player and writer
- Tom Townsend, secret identity of fictional Marvel superhero Captain Flag
- Tommy Townsend, American football punter

== See also ==
- Thomas Townshend (disambiguation)
