= John Townend (rugby league) =

English rugby league footballer

Personal information
- Full name: John Townend
- Born: unknown
- Died: unknown

Playing information
Club
Years	Team	Pld	T	G	FG	P
1895–02	Hull FC

John "Jack" Townend (date of birth unknown – date of death unknown) was an English professional rugby league footballer who played in the 1890s and 1900s. He played at club level for Hull FC, and was captain of Hull F.C. during the 1900–01 season.
