= List of Hull F.C. players =

Hull F.C. (known as the Hull FC between 1996 and 1999) is an English rugby league club who have had numerous notable players (1,200 as of 27 May 2024) throughout their history, each player of the rugby league era who has played (and so excludes non-playing substitutes) in a competitive first-class match (including those matches that were subsequently abandoned, expunged or re-played, but excluding friendlies) is included.

== List of players ==
Last updated: 15 November 2026

Heritage	Name	Position	Début Season	Last season	Notes
455	Unknown Abbott		1943–44	1944–45	
663	John Abey		1969–70	1971–72	
42	W. Adamson		1896–97	1898–99	
335	J.N. Adamson		1930–31	1931–32	
1117	Jordan Abdull	Stand-off, Scrum-half, Loose forward	2014	2018	5 February 1996 (age 30) ‡
785	Fred Ah Kuoi	Stand-off	1983–84	1987–88	7 June 1956 (age 70) ‡
467	Unknown Ainley		1944–45	1945–46	
273	H. Akester		1922–23	1923-24	
1077	Jack Aldous	Prop	2011	2011	3 April 1991 (age 35) ‡
589	Colin Ali		1958-59	1964-65	
395	Albert Allen		1938-39	1946-47	
205	Arthur Allen		1911-12	1914-15	
487	J.M. Anderson		1945-46	1949-50	
167	Billie Anderson		1907-08	1918-19	
172	M. Appleyard		1907-08	1908-09	
450	Tommy Armitt	Hooker	1943-44	1944-45	World War II Guest from Swinton
1224	Jake Arthur	Stand-off, Scrum-half	2026	present	27 September 2002 (age 24)
791	Carl Arnett		1984-85	1986-87	‡
1099	Joe Arundel	Centre	2012	2014	22 August 1991 (age 35) ‡
587	George Ashbridge		1958-59	1960-61	
339	Jimmy Ashton		1930-31	1931-32	
1194	Jack Ashworth	Prop, Second-row	2024	2025	3 July 1995 (age 31)
1214	John Asiata	Loose forward, Prop	2025	present	19 April 1993 (age 33)
1082	Martin Aspinwall	Loose forward	2011	2012	21 October 1981 (age 45) ‡
675	Harry Aston		1971-72	1973-74	
899	Jon Aston	Prop, Second-row	1994-95	1998	5 June 1976 (age 50) ‡
147	Ernest Atkinson	Wing	1905-06	1910-11	
299	Herbert Atkinson		1925-26	1926-27	
452	Sid Atkinson		1943-44	1944-45	
1200	Yusuf Aydin	Prop	2024	present	13 September 2000 (age 26)
916	Marcus Bai	Wing	1996	1996	
941	David Baildon	Wing, Centre	1998	1999	26 January 1971 (age 55) ‡
1021	Andy Bailey	Second-row	2004	2005	15 October 1982 (age 44) ‡
1228	Connor Bailey	Stand-off, Scrum-half, Second-row	2026	present	10 October 2000 (age 26)‡
1171	Denive Balmforth	Hooker, Loose forward	2022	present	1 October 2003 (age 23)
	Maurice Bamford		1953-54	1957-58	Reserve team only, never played 1st team rugby league for Hull F.C.
732	Alan Bancroft		1977-78	1978-79	
415	.. Bancroft		1941-42	1942-43	
708	Anthony Banham		1974-75	1976-77	
756	Barry Banks	Fullback, Centre, Stand-off	1980-81	1984-85	‡
157	Samuel Banks	Forward	1906-07	1907-08	Also for Wakefield Trinity?
714	Ron Barham		1974-75	1976-77	
7	George E. Barker		1895-96	1898–99	Pre-Northern Union?
20	J.S. Barker		1895–96	1898–99	Pre-Northern Union?
1013	Dwayne Barker	Loose forward	2003	2003	21 September 1984 (age 42) ‡
338	George Barlow		1930-31	1943-44	
364	Lawrence Barlow		1934-35	1943-44	
1003	Richie Barnett	Centre	2003	2004	21 April 1972 (age 54) ‡
1020	Richie Barnett Jr.	Wing	2004	2005	26 April 1981 (age 45) ‡
604	Keith Barnwell		1961-62	1968-69	
711	Keith Barr		1974-75	1979-80	
86	H. Barraclough		1900-01	1901-02	
1178	Harvey Barron	Wing	2022	present	13 May 2003 (age 23)
210	Alfred Barrow		1911-12	1913-14	
950	Steve Barrow	Prop, Second-row	1998	1999	8 December 1975 (age 50) ‡
156	J. Barton		1906-07	1907-08	
1226	Joe Batchelor	Second-row	2026	present	28 October 1994 (age 32)
334	George Bateman		1933-34	1942-43	
574	Peter Bateson		1957-58	1963-64	
282	Arnold Bateson		1923-24	1935-36	
262	Edward Batten		1920-21	1921-22	
228	Billy Batten	Centre, Fullback, Wing	1913-14	1924-25	
307	Billy Batten Jr.		1927-28	1929-30	
197	F. Battersby		1910-11	1911-12	
355	R. Baxter		1932-33	1933-34	
432	Les Baxter		1942-43	1951-52	
211	W. Beales		1911-12	1912-13	
390	George Beales		1938-39	1947-48	
289	Herbert Beardshaw		1924-25	1927-28	
661	John Beasley		1968-69	1970-71	
224	Jack Beasty		1912-13	1924-25	
73	J. Beaumont		1899-1900	1900–01	
418	Harry Beaumont		1941-42	1942-43	World War II Guest from Hull KR
420	Louis Beaumont		1941-42	1946-47	World War II Guest from Hull KR
496	Arthur Bedford		1946-47	1956-57	
400	Harold Bedford		1939-40	1943-44	
433	Ted Bedford		1942-43	1948-49	
91	F. J. Bell		1901-02	1902-03	
162	T. Bell		1907-08	1908-09	
778	Alan Bell		1982-83	1983-84	‡
1005	Ian Bell	Centre	2003	2003	28 January 1983 (age 43) ‡
1229	James Bell	Loose forward, Second-row	2026	present	2 May 1994 (age 32)‡
638	Roy Bell		1964-65	1965-66	
215	W. O. Bemrose		1912-13	1913-14	
303	Eric Benson		1926-27	1927-28	
1047	Shaun Berrigan	Centre, Stand-off, Scrum-half, Hooker	2008	2010	4 November 1978 (age 48) ‡
1002	Colin Best	Fullback, Wing, Centre	2003	2004	22 November 1978 (age 47) ‡
1146	Lewis Bienek	Prop	2018	2020	11 April 1998 (age 28) ‡
387	Joe Bilton		1937-38	1943-44	
969	Deon Bird	Fullback, Wing, Centre	2000	2002	27 January 1976 (age 50) ‡
747	Charlie Birdsall	Prop, Second-row	1979-80	1982-83	‡
837	Brian Blacker		1988-89	1992-93	‡
1026	Nathan Blacklock	Fullback, Wing	2005	2006	4 April 1976 (age 50) ‡
438	Lory Blanchard	Hooker, Prop	1942-43	1943-44	
133	W. Bland		1904-05	1905-06	
512	Harold Boagey		1948-49	1950-51	
377	R. Boddy		1936-37	1937-38	
276	R.W. Bolderson		1922-23	1927-28	
33	Joe Bolton		1895–96	1898–99	Pre-Northern Union?
457	… Bond		1943-44	1944-45	
372	Charlie Booth	Hooker, Second-row	1935-36	1950-51	Father/grandfather of Charlie Booth?
605	Charlie Booth		1961-62	1968-69	Son of Charlie Booth?
10	Graham Booth		1895–96	1898–99	Pre-Northern Union?
621	Roger Booth		1963-64	1967-68	
945	Simon Booth	Second-row	1998	1999	9 December 1971 (age 54) ‡
888	Lee Boulter		1993-94	1994-95	13 December 1973 (age 52) ‡
1220	Amir Bourouh	Hooker	2025	present	5 January 2001 (age 25)
585	Richard Boustead		1958-59	1959-60	
439	J. Bowden		1942-43	1943-44	
1084	Josh Bowden	Prop, Loose forward	2011	2022	14 January 1992 (age 34) ‡
394	Albert Bowers	Wing	1938-39	1949-50	
271	Harold Bowman	Prop	1921-22	1939-40	
555	Keith Bowman		1953-54	1958-59	
666	Keith Boxall	Prop, Hooker, Second-row	1969-70	1981-82	‡
929	David Boyd	Second-row, Prop	1997	1998	Also for Canterbury Bulldogs, Newcastle Knights, Western Reds
831	David Boyle	Prop, Second-row	1988-89	1989-90	
177	Frank Boylen	Forward	1908-09	1914-15	Two stints
442	Len Bratley	Prop, Loose forward	1942-43	1943-44	Wartime guest
808	Michael Brand		1985-86	1988-89	‡
725	Graham Bray	Wing	1976-77	1981-82	‡
281	Bill Brennan		1923-24	1924-25	
776	John Keith Bridges	Hooker	1982-83	1983-84	‡
564	Derek Brindle		1954-55	1955-56	
1105	Jack Briscoe	Fullback, Wing	2010	2013	25 October 1991 (age 35) ‡
1015	Shaun Briscoe	Fullback, Wing	2004	2007	23 February 1983 (age 43) ‡
1050	Tom Briscoe	Fullback, Wing, Centre	2008	2013	19 March 1990 (age 36) ‡
203	F. Britton		1911-12		
178	Stanley Britton		1908-09	1912-13	
973	Paul Broadbent	Prop	2000	2001	24 May 1968 (age 58) ‡
576	Frank Broadhurst		1957-58	1962-63	
40	J. Brocklebank		1896–97	1897-98	
391	Stan Brogden	Wing, Centre, Stand-off	1938-39	1941-42	
322	A. Brook		1928-29	1929-30	
825	David Brooks	Second-row	1987-88	1988-89	24 May 1962 (age 64) ‡
629	Eric Broom		1963-64	1975-76	
1030	Danny Brough	Scrum-half, Hooker	2005	2006	15 January 1983 (age 43)
1054	Jodie Broughton	Wing, Centre	2008	2009	9 January 1988 (age 38) ‡
108	Ernest William Brown		1902-03	1904-05	
1190	Fa'amanu Brown	Stand-off, Scrum-half, Hooker	2024	2024	Left to join St. George Dragons
1151	Jack Brown	Loose forward, Prop	2019	2024	Left to join Hull KR
186	R. S. Brown		1909-10	1910-11	
311	W. Brown		1927-28	1928-29	
815	David Brown	Prop	1986-87	1987-88	5 December 1957 (age 68) ‡
637	Joe Brown		1964-65	1971-72	
966	Lee Brown	Prop	1999	1999	‡
166	T. Bruce		1907-08	1909-10	
150	J. Brunyard		1905-06	1906-07	
30	G. E. Bryan		1895–96	1896–97	Pre-Northern Union?
1153	Kieran Buchanan	Centre, Wing, Fullback	2019	2020	Left to join Batley Bulldogs
117	T. Bulless		1902-03		
838	Adrian Bullock		1988-89	1989-90	‡
1195	Joe Bullock	Prop, Second-row	2024	2024	Loaned from Warrington Wolves
140	Jim Burchell		1904-05		
524	Don Burnell		1949-50	1953-54	
1052	Mike Burnett	Second-row	2008	2011	6 October 1989 (age 37) ‡
1164	Aidan Burrell		2021	2021	
71	W. Burrell		1899–1900	1900–01	
915	David Busby	Loose forward, Second-row	1996	1996	
859	Dean Busby	Second-row, Loose forward, Prop	1990-91	1998	1 February 1973 (age 53) ‡
773	David Busfield	Second-row	1981-82	1983-84	22 November 1947 (age 78) ‡
709	Ray Butler		1974-75	1975-76	
76	C.H. Buttery		1899–1900		
908	Shane Buttle	Wing	1995-96	1996	
1046	Todd Byrne	Fullback, Wing, Centre	2008	2009	16 July 1978 (age 48) ‡
700	Steve Calder		1973-74	1974-75	
1056	Mark Calderwood	Wing	2009	2010	25 October 1981 (age 45) ‡
952	Matt Calland	Centre	1999	1999	20 August 1971 (age 55) ‡
366	Harry Calvert		1933-34		
471	R. Camac		1944-45	1945-46	
796	Adrian Cambriani		1984-85	1986-87	‡
938	Logan Campbell	Centre, Second-row, Loose forward	1997	2001	23 May 1971 (age 55) ‡
213	Charles Cappleman		1911-12	1913-14	
121	T. Carlisle		1903-04	1905-06	
879	Brendan Carlyle	Fullback, Wing, Stand-off, Centre	1992-93	1993-94	‡
324	Andrew Carmichael	Stand-off, Loose forward	1929-30	1939-40	Also played for Hull KR
460	George Carmichael	Fullback	1943-44	1944-45	Wartime guest from Bradford Northern
620	Trevor Carmichael		1963-64	1966-67	
979	Brian Carney	Wing	2000	2000	23 July 1976 (age 50) ‡
8	H. R. Carr		1895–96	1896–97	Pre-Northern Union?
143	William J. Carroll		1904-05	1909-10	
829	John Carroll		1987-88	1988-89	‡
912	Darren Carter	Centre	1996	1996	Not the same person as ex-Workington & Barrow Darren Carter
1206	Jed Cartwright	Second-row, Centre, Loose forward	2024	present	24 October 1996 (age 30)
992	Garreth Carvell	Prop, Second-row	2001	2008	21 April 1980 (age 46) ‡
126	Patsy J. Carvill		1903-04	1906-07	
669	Len Casey	Prop, Second-row, Loose forward	1970-71	1976-77	Later coached Hull FC
619	Terry Casey		1963-64	1964-65	Is this the same person as Terry Casey?
883	Jez Cassidy	Hooker, Loose forward	1993-94	1996	30 March 1974 (age 52) ‡
171	J. W. Castles		1907-08	1908-09	
248	Eddie Caswell	Stand-off	1919-20	1935-36	Later coached Hull FC
1160	Joe Cator	Loose forward	2020	2024	Joined Toulouse Olympique; 15 June 1998 (age 28)
1199	Ed Chamberlain	Fullback, Wing, Centre	2024	2024	Loan from Leigh Leopards
1201	Tiaki Chan	Prop	2024	2024	Loaned from Wigan Warriors 15 June 2000 (age 26)
430	W. Chapman		1942-43	1943-44	
263	William J. Charles		1921-22	1923-24	
1196	Jack Charles	Stand-off, Scrum-half	2024	2024	
853	Marquis Charles		1989-90	1991-92	‡
649	Graham Charlesworth		1966-67	1969-70	
998	Chris Chester	Stand-off, Second-row, Loose forward	2002	2006	8 October 1978 (age 48) ‡
757	Robin Chester	Stand-off, Scrum-half	1980-81	1982-83	‡
921	Lee Child	Wing	1996	1996	Also for Wakefield Trinity, Featherstone Rovers
470	Tom Clapham		1944-45	1945-46	
874	Garry Clark	Wing	1992-93	1993-94	4 January 1965 (age 61) ‡
712	George Clark		1974-75	1979-80	
534	Joe "Cloggy" Clark		1949-50	1955-56	
1234	Lennon Clark	Second-row	2026	present	12 November 2005 (age 21)
705	Keith Clarke		1974-75	1975-76	
416	Len Clarke		1941-42	1945-46	World War II Guest from Hull KR
194	Ellis Clarkson	Fullback	1910-11	1914-15	From Leigh, Greater Manchester
827	Gary Clarkson		1987-88	1988-89	‡
753	Terry Clawson	Second-row, Prop	1979-80	1980-81	
845	Noel Cleal	Centre, Second-row	1989-90	1991-92	Later coached Hull FC; 16 October 1957 (age 69) ‡
1183	Jake Clifford	Stand-off, Scrum-half	2023	2023	Left to join North Queensland Cowboys
602	Brian Clixby		1960-61	1967-68	
469	Alfred Codd		1944-45	1946-47	
1114	Liam Colbon	Wing	2014	2014	20 September 1984 (age 42) ‡
566	Colin Cole		1954-55	1960-61	
833	Craig Coleman	Halfback	1988-89	1989-90	31 January 1963 (age 63) ‡
361	Fred Colling		1934-35	1938-39	
280	Tom Collins	Centre	1923-24	1929-30	
968	Steve Collins	Fullback, Centre, Wing	2000	2000	9 April 1974 (age 52) ‡
789	Anthony Collinson		1984-85	1985-86	‡
181	George Connell		1908-09	1915-16	
519	Bernard Conway		1948-49	1956-57	
1138	Jake Connor	Fullback, Centre, Stand-off, Scrum-half	2017	2022	18 October 1994 (age 32) ‡
110	Jim Cook		1902-03	1908-09	
961	Paul Cooke	Stand-off, Scrum-half, Loose forward	1999	2007	17 April 1981 (age 45) ‡
531	Brian Cooper	Centre	1949-50	1960-61	
695	Colin Cooper		1972-73	1974-75	
610	Ian Corban		1961-62	1963-64	
1061	Josh Cordoba	Prop	2009	2009	29 January 1984 (age 42) ‡
363	Bob Corner		1934-35	1942-43	
70	Frederick Henry Cornish	Forward	1899–1900	1900–01	Joined from Cardiff RFC
356	… Cotterill		1933-34	1934-35	
165	George Thomas "Rocky" Cottrell	Wing, Centre	1907-08	1914-15	From Cheltenham, signed from Halifax RLFC
561	Bill Coulman		1953-54	1958-59	
36	James Coulthard		1896–97	1898–99	Later was Mayor of Birkenhead
745	Phil Coupland		1979-80	1980-81	
325	W. James Courtney		1929-30	1936-37	
546	Bob Coverdale	Prop	1951-52	1957-58	
617	Bob Coverley		1962-63	1966-67	
291	James Cowan		1924-25	1925-26	
768	Mario Cowan		1981-82	1982-83	‡
679	Ronnie Cowan	Wing, Centre	1971-72	1973-74	
563	Stan Cowan	Wing, Centre	1954-55	1963-64	
542	Gerald Cox		1950-51	1953-54	
719	Jimmy Crampton		1975-76	1978-79	
412	Harry Crane		1940-41	1948-49	
670	Mick Crane	Centre, Second-row, Loose forward	1970-71	1987-88	‡
892	Steve Craven	Prop, Second-row	1994-95	2003	9 April 1972 (age 54) ‡
449	… Crawford		1943-44	1944-45	
594	Barry Croft		1959-60	1960-61	
385	Ken Croft		1937-38	1945-46	
477	… Crook		1944-45	1945-46	
932	Paul Crook	Centre, Loose forward, Second-row, Stand-off	1997	1997	
1098	Jason Crookes	Wing	2012	2014	21 April 1990 (age 36) ‡
1089	Ben Crooks	Wing, Centre	2011	2014	15 June 1993 (age 33) ‡
758	Lee Crooks	Prop, Second-row	1980-81	1987-88	18 September 1963 (age 63) ‡
811	Steve Crooks	Hooker	1986-87	1992-93	‡
458	George Crossland		1943-44	1944-45	World War II Guest from Swinton
81	F.H. Crowe		1900–01	1901-02	
724	Ian Crowther	Hooker	1976-77	1981-82	‡
989	Matt Crowther	Fullback, Wing	2001	2003	6 May 1974 (age 52) ‡
315	R. Cummings		1928-29	1929-30	
1094	James Cunningham	Hooker	2011	2015	3 April 1994 (age 32) ‡
1071	Liam Cunningham	Centre, Loose forward	2010	2012	28 October 1989 (age 37) ‡
353	W.T. Curtis		1932-33	1933-34	
1049	Peter Cusack	Prop	2008	2010	27 January 1977 (age 49) ‡
1212	Cade Cust	Stand-off, Hooker	2025	present	14 September 1998 (age 28)
409	John Daddy		1941-42	1942-43	
58	W. Dale		1897–98	1900–01	
1036	Matty Dale	Second-row	2006	2008	10 October 1986 (age 40) ‡
881	Robert Danby	Centre, Stand-off	1992-93	1997	30 August 1974 (age 52) ‡
779	Andy Dannatt	Prop, Second-row, Loose forward	1983-84	1993-94	20 November 1965 (age 60) ‡
569	Geoff Dannatt		1955-56	1961-62	
514	Tom Danter	Prop	1948-49	1951-52	
145	C. D'Arcy		1905-06	1906-07	
922	Paul Darley	Hooker, Second-row, Loose forward	1996	1996	
568	Brian Darlington		1955-56	1959-60	
218	Steve Darmody	Wing, Centre, Loose forward	1912-13	1915-16	
893	Maea David	Second-row	1994-95	1998	27 February 1972 (age 54) ‡
630	Chris Davidson		1963-64	1979-80	
627	Derek Davies		1963-64	1964-65	
507	E.R. Davies		1947-48	1948-49	
558	P. Davies		1953-54	1954-55	
380	R.W. Davies		1936-37	1937-38	
293	W. Jack Davies	Centre	1925-26	1932-33	W. J. Davies played at centre and scored a try in Glamorgan's 18–14 victory over Monmouthshire in the non-County Championship match during the 1926–27 season at Taff Vale Park, Pontypridd on Saturday 30 April 1927.
347	Jack Dawson		1932-33	1942-43	
1147	Matty Dawson-Jones	Wing, Centre	2019	2019	Left to join Bradford Bulls; 2 October 1990 (age 36)
769	Terry Day	Wing, Centre, Stand-off	1981-82	1983-84	‡
967	Matt Daylight	Wing	2000	2000	2 March 1974 (age 52) ‡
24	N. Deacon		1895–96	1896–97	Pre-Northern Union?
911	Leigh Deakin	Fullback, Wing	1995-96	1997	
759	Tony Dean	Scrum-half, Loose forward	1980-81	1984-85	‡
239	Sid Deane	Centre, Five-eighth	1914-15	1915-16	
871	Andrew Dearlove	Stand-off, Scrum-half	1992-93	1994-95	19 September 1972 (age 54) ‡
176	James Dechan	Wing, Centre	1908-09	1909-10	
80	A. J. Deere		1899–1900	1901-02	
752	Steve Dennison	Wing, Centre, Stand-off	1979-80	1982-83	‡
503	A. Desborough		1946-47	1948-49	
184	Jim Devereux	Centre, Stand-off	1909-10	1915-16	
597	Terry Devonshire		1959-60	1975-76	
813	Kevin Dick	Scrum-half	1986-87	1988-89	‡
283	W. H. Dickinson		1923-24	1924-25	
199	T. Dinsdale		1910-11	1911-12	
249	Joe Dinsdale		1919-20	1920-21	
686	Len Dittmar		1972-73	1973-74	
877	Daniel Divet	Second-row, Loose forward	1992-93	1994-95	11 December 1966 (age 59) ‡
784	Gary Divorty	Second-row, Loose forward	1983-84	1997	28 January 1966 (age 60) ‡
1024	Kirk Dixon	Wing, Centre	2004	2006	19 July 1984 (age 42) ‡
850	Mike Dixon	Hooker	1989-90	1997	6 April 1971 (age 55) ‡
986	Michael Docherty	Prop	2000	2001	13 October 1979 (age 47) ‡
478	Alec Dockar	Loose forward	1945-46	1946-47	World War II Guest from Hull KR
386	Walter Dockar		1937-38	1946-47	
843	Paul Doherty		1989-90	1990-91	‡
1034	Sid Domic	Centre, Second-row, Loose forward	2006	2007	8 February 1975 (age 51) ‡
22	L. Donkin		1895–96	1898–99	Pre-Northern Union?
1001	Glen Donkin		2002	2003	16 September 1982 (age 44) ‡
875	Matthew Donkin	Wing	1992-93	1995-96	23 November 1971 (age 54) ‡
931	Jason Donohue	Hooker	1997	1998	18 April 1972 (age 54) ‡
1009	Ewan Dowes	Prop, Second-row	2003	2011	4 March 1981 (age 45) ‡
1129	Jack Downs	Centre, Second-row	2015	2018	10 November 1995 (age 31) ‡
461	Bill Downing		1943-44	1951-52	
887	Jeff Doyle	Centre	1993-94	1994-95	1 October 1967 (age 59) ‡
601	David Doyle-Davidson		1960-61	1972-73	
553	Bill Drake	Wing, Prop, Second-row	1952-53	1964-65	
544	Jim Drake	Fullback, Prop, Second-row, Loose forward	1950-51	1962-63	
691	Alan Drew		1972-73	1973-74	
64	Hockey Driscoll	Centre, Fullback	1898–99	1902-03	Joined from Cardiff RFC
174	G. Duffield		1908-09	1909-10	
190	P. Duffy		1910-11	1911-12	
906	Gary Duke	Hooker	1995-96	1996	‡
655	Tony Duke	Hooker	1967-68	1983-84	‡
85	T. Dunn		1900–01	1901-02	
858	Steve Durham	Prop	1990-91	1993-94	12 October 1963 (age 63) ‡
707	Tom Dusher		1974-75	1975-76	
1184	Brad Dwyer	Hooker	2023	2023	Left to rejoin Warrington Wolves
1051	Adam Dykes	Scrum-half, Stand-off	2008	2008	5 February 1977 (age 49) ‡
1016	Michael Eagar	Centre, Fullback, Stand-off	2004	2005	15 August 1973 (age 53) ‡
316	M. Eastburn		1928-29	1929-30	
446	J. Eastwood		1942-43	1943-44	
830	Jason Eastwood		1987-88	1988-89	‡
795	Paul Eastwood	Wing	1984-85	1994-95	3 December 1965 (age 60) ‡
447	Charlie Eaton		1943-44	1944-45	
435	J. Eddoms		1942-43	1944-45	
445	J. Edmonds		1942-43	1945-46	
777	Phil Edmonds	Prop	1982-83	1987-88	‡
692	Ray Edmonds		1972-73	1975-76	
131	D. H. Edmunds		1904-05	1905-06	
632	John Edson		1963-64	1969-70	
483	R. Edwards		1945-46	1946-47	
163	C. W. Eggett		1907-08	1908-09	
60	W. Eley		1897–98	1898–99	
	Nicholas Elgar	Second-row, Loose forward	1986-87	1988-89	‡
116	G. Ellerington		1902-03	1904-05	
330	Harold Ellerington	Fullback, Wing, Centre, Stand-off, Scrum-half, Prop, Loose forward	1930-31	1942-43	
279	Claude Ellery		1923-24	1924-25	
763	David Elliott	Wing, Centre	1980-81	1985-86	23 February 1971 (age 55) ‡
264	Joe Ellis		1921-22	1923-24	
631	Bob Ellis		1963-64	1964-65	
1106	Gareth Ellis	Prop, Second-row, Loose forward	2012	2017	3 May 1981 (age 45) ‡
824	Ian Ellis		1987-88	1988-89	‡
1085	Jamie Ellis	Stand-off, Scrum-half	2011	2012	4 October 1989 (age 37) ‡
214	G.W. Empson		1912-13	1913-14	
894	Shane Endacott	Centre, Stand-off	1994-95	1995-96	3 September 1971 (age 55) ‡
856	Patrick Entat	Scrum-half	1990-91	1991-92	18 September 1964 (age 62) ‡
308	Stan Errington		1927-28	1933-34	
1191	Herman Ese'ese	Prop, Loose forward	2024	present	
1207	Sam Eseh	Prop	2024	2025	30 June 2003 (age 23)
120	Lionel Godfrey Evans		1903-04	1904-05	
744	Graham Evans	Centre	1979-80	1981-82	‡
509	Hagan Evans	Loose forward	1947-48	1951-52	
1170	Kane Evans	Prop	2022	2023	
593	Sam Evans		1959-60	1960-61	
771	Steve Evans	Wing, Centre, Stand-off	1981-82	1987-88	‡
314	Ron Everitt		1928-29	1930-31	
498	Paddy Fallon		1946-47	1949-50	
1141	Bureta Faraimo	Wing	2018	2021	16 July 1990 (age 36) ‡
733	Vince Farrar	Prop, Hooker, Loose forward	1977-78	1981-82	‡
985	Craig Farrell	Wing, Centre, Second-row, Loose forward	2000	2001	8 October 1981 (age 45) ‡
1128	Brad Fash	Loose forward	2015	present	24 January 1996 (age 30) ‡
1033	Sione Faumuina	Centre, Stand-off, Second-row	2005	2005	27 March 1981 (age 45) ‡
50	W. Fearnley		1897–98	1898–99	
860	Stephen Feather		1990-91	1992-93	‡
11	William Feetham		1895–96	1898–99	Pre-Northern Union?
1053	Adel Fellous	Prop	2008	2008	16 February 1978 (age 48) ‡
977	Luke Felsch	Prop, Second-row	2000	2001	5 April 1974 (age 52) ‡
344	Cec Fifield	Centre	1931-32	1938-39	
59	P. Fildes		1897–98	1903-04	
565	Tommy Finn	Scrum-half	1954-55	1967-68	
657	Howard Firth		1968-69	1975-76	
659	Roy Firth	Hooker	1968-69	1972-73	
129	A. Fisher		1903-04	1904-05	
905	Andy Fisher	Prop, Second-row	1995-96	1997	
920	Peter Fitzgerald	Wing, Fullback, Stand-off	1996	1996	Not the same person as Peter Fitzgerald
1066	Craig Fitzgibbon	Prop, Loose forward	2010	2011	16 June 1977 (age 49) ‡
717	Peter Flanagan	Hooker	1975-76	1978-79	
252	Maurice Fleming		1919-20	1920-21	
376	Thomas Fletcher		1936-37	1937-38	It’s not Tom Fletcher
820	Paul Fletcher		1987-88	1990-91	‡
960	Richard Fletcher	Second-row	1999	2004	17 May 1981 (age 45)
842	Steve Folkes	Second-row	1989-90	1990-91	Died: 27 February 2018 (aged 59) ‡
1131	Mahe Fonua	Wing, Centre	2016	2017	24 December 1992 (age 33) ‡
536	Des Foreman		1950-51	1954-55	
244	J. Forrester		1919-20	1920-21	
54	R. Forshaw		1897–98	1900–01	
654	Chris Forster		1967-68	1971-72	
1095	Jamie Foster	Wing, Centre	2011	2012	27 July 1990 (age 36) ‡
701	Les Foster		1973-74	1974-75	
902	Shane Foster	Wing	1995-96	1996	
634	Kenneth Foulkes		1964-65	1977-78	
195	Alfred Francis	Wing	1910-11	1919-20	
525	Roy Francis	Wing	1949-50	1956-57	Later coached Hull FC twice
226	G.E. Franklin		1913-14	1914-15	
44	Dimmy Franks	Stand-off, Scrum-half	1897–98	1904-05	
100	J. Frater		1901-02	1902-03	
141	Arthur E. Freear		1904-05	1907-08	
473	John French		1945-46	1946-47	
97	Hugh Fulton		1901-02	1908-09	
755	Bob Gaitley	Stand-off	1980-81	1981-82	‡
1168	Luke Gale	Scrum-half, Stand-off	2022	2022	Left to join Keighley Cougars
823	Scott Gale	Halfback, Centre, Five-eighth	1987-88	1993-94	10 February 1965 (age 61) ‡
1101	Ben Galea	Second-row, Loose forward	2012	2013	16 August 1978 (age 48) ‡
196	David Galloway	Forward	1910-11	1911-12	
306	Jimmy Gardiner		1927-28	1928-29	
1180	Will Gardiner	Loose forward, Prop	2022	2025	21 May 2001 (age 25)
516	Fred Garmston		1948-49	1952-53	
275	Fred Garratt		1922-23	1923-24	
243	Harold Garrett		1919-20	1926-27	
300	R. Garvey		1925-26	1926-27	
805	Andy Gascoigne		1985-86	1986-87	‡
846	Richard Gay	Fullback	1989-90	1996	9 March 1969 (age 57) ‡
468	Horace Gee		1943-44	1944-45	World War II Guest from Hull KR
603	Dick Gemmell	Centre	1961-62	1968-69	
972	Stanley Gene	Stand-off, Scrum-half, Second-row, Loose forward	2000	2001	11 May 1974 (age 52) ‡
668	Tony Geraghty		1969-70	1976-77	
389	S. Gerrard		1938-39	1939-40	
806	Geoff Gerard	Second-row, Centre, Prop	1985-86	1986-87	Surname occasionally misspelt Gerrard 10 July 1955 (age 71) ‡
814	Michael Gibbins	Prop, Second-row	1986-87	1987-88	‡
688	Arthur Gibbons		1972-73	1976-77	
217	Herb Gilbert	Centre	1912-13	1915-16	
28	W. Gill		1895–96	1897–98	Pre-Northern Union?
584	Ray Gill		1958-59	1959-60	
648	Norman Gillard		1966-67	1967-68	
336	C. Gillyon		1930-31	1931-32	
348	John Gissing		1932-33	1933-34	
513	Keith Gittoes		1948-49	1957-58	
1076	Martin Gleeson	Centre	2011	2011	25 May 1980 (age 46) ‡
425	Tommy Glynn		1941-42	1948-49	
112	Dicky Goddard	Halfback	1902-03	1905-06	
1040	Wayne Godwin	Hooker	2007	2007	13 March 1982 (age 44) ‡
440	Joe Golby		1942-43	1943-44	1-match World War II Guest (from Wigan? ex-Dewsbury)
382	W. Goodall		1937-38	1938-39	
135	Fred Goodfellow	Wing, Centre	1904-05	1906-07	
53	Fred Gorman		1897–98	1901-02	
371	Clarence Gouldstone		1935-36	1936-37	
278	J. Grady		1923-24	1924-25	
472	T. Graham		1944-45	1945-46	
872	James Grant	Wing, Centre	1992-93	1994-95	22 May 1964 (age 62) ‡
884	Kevin Gray	Wing, Centre	1993-94	1998	10 December 1975 (age 50) ‡
904	Alex Green	Stand-off, Scrum-half	1995-96	1996	
1086	Chris Green	Prop, Second-row, Loose forward	2011	2019	3 January 1990 (age 36) ‡
999	Craig Greenhill	Prop	2002	2003	14 February 1972 (age 54) ‡
227	W. Greenwood		1913-14	1914-15	
890	Brandon Greenwood	Wing, Centre	1993-94	1995-96	28 April 1972 (age 54) ‡
255	J. R. Gresswell		1920-21	1921-22	
207	Alf Grice		1911-12	1918-19	
26	W. Griffin		1895–96	1896–97	Pre-Northern Union?
801	Danny Griffin		1984-85	1985-86	‡
1136	Josh Griffin	Wing, Centre, Second-row	2017	2023	9 May 1990 (age 36) ‡
984	Tony Grimaldi	Hooker, Second-row, Loose forward	2000	2001	21 November 1974 (age 51) ‡
465	F.H. Gutherless		1944-45	1945-46	
267	Thomas Emlyn Gwynne	Wing	1921-22	1931-32	
1104	Dean Hadley	Centre, Stand-off, Hooker, Second-row, Loose forward	2012	2019	5 August 1992 (age 34) ‡
436	T. Hagan		1942-43	1946-47	
595	Nan Halafihi		1959-60	1961-62	
111	George Hall		1902-03	1905-06	
148	W. Hall		1905-06	1906-07	
1042	Craig Hall	Fullback, Wing, Centre, Stand-off	2007	2010	21 February 1988 (age 38) ‡
953	Martin Hall	Hooker	1999	1999	5 December 1968 (age 57) ‡
727	Peter Hall	Stand-off	1976-77	1981-82	‡
309	Wilson Hall	Scrum-half, Fullback	1927-28	1929-30	Also for Ngaruawahia (Waikato), Athletic (Auckland) Hornby (Canterbury), Castleford and Dewsbury
935	Graeme Hallas	Wing, Centre, Stand-off, Loose forward	1997	1999	27 February 1971 (age 55) ‡
577	Brian Hambling		1957-58	1962-63	
95	A. Hambrecht		1901-02	1902-03	
83	B. Hamm		1900–01	1901-02	
230	Joe Hammill	Forward	1913-14	1916-17	
652	Brian Hancock		1967-68	1981-82	‡
504	Laurie Hand		1946-47	1948-49	
861	Lee Hanlan	Centre, Stand-off	1990-91	1992-93	Surname occasionally misspelt Hanlon 6 October 1971 (age 55) ‡
104	J. Hardaker		1902-03	1903-04	
1218	Zak Hardaker	Centre, Fullback, Wing	2025	present	17 October 1991 (age 35)
128	W. Hargreaves		1903-04	1905-06	
770	Kevin Harkin	Scrum-half	1981-82	1984-85	‡
208	P. Harland		1911-12	1912-13	
9	Wilson Harmer		1895–96	1903-04	Pre-Northern Union?
288	C. E. Harris		1924-25	1925-26	
1145	Liam Harris	Scrum-half	2018	2020	20 April 1997 (age 29) ‡
528	Tommy Harris	Hooker	1949-50	1962-63	
926	Wayne Harris	Stand-off, Loose forward	1997	1997	
130	A. Harrison		1904-05	1905-06	
740	Chris Harrison	Centre	1978-79	1982-83	‡
25	F. Harrison		1895–96	1896–97	Pre-Northern Union?
Pre-1895	Gilbert Harrison		c. 1877	c. 1885	Only Rugby Football Union?
575	Gordon Harrison		1957-58	1961-62	
342	Reg Harrison		1931-32	1932-33	
216	Jack Harrison	Wing	1912-13	1915-16	Killed in France 1917; won the VC & MC
114	James Harrison		1902-03	1907-08	
672	Jim Harrison		1970-71	1973-74	NOT James Harrison
839	Karl Harrison	Prop	1989-90	1999	20 February 1964 (age 62) ‡
642	Mick Harrison	Prop	1965-66	1983-84	2 stints ‡
851	Paul Harrison		1989-90	1993-94	24 September 1970 (age 56) ‡
527	Syd Harrison		1949-50	1951-52	
317	Robert Harsley		1928-29	1931-32	
515	Tom Hart		1948-49	1953-54	Also for Castleford? 1940–41 Thomas R. Hart/Thomas Hart
886	Des Hasler	Halfback, Lock, Hooker	1993-94	1995-96	16 February 1961 (age 65) ‡
65	H. Hatfield		1898–99	1900–01	
396	Sid Hattersley		1938-39	1949-50	
180	Harry Havelock		1908-09	1910-11	
526	Jack Hayes	Hooker	1949-50	1950-51	On loan from Widnes, occasionally misnamed William
1044	Mathew Head	Scrum-half, Stand-off	2007	2007	9 May 1982 (age 44) ‡
204	L. V. Heath		1911-12	1912-13	
697	Rob Hemingway		1972-73	1973-74	
580	R. Henderson		1957-58	1958-59	
873	Ivan Henjak	Halfback, Five-eighth, Centre	1992-93	1993-94	9 March 1963 (age 63) ‡
296	Ernest Henrikson		1925-26	1926-27	
835	Neil Henry	Five-eighth	1988-89	1989-90	23 January 1961 (age 65) ‡
258	H. Henson		1920-21	1921-22	
936	Brad Hepi	Hooker, Loose forward	1997	1998	11 February 1968 (age 58) ‡
721	Keith Hepworth	Scrum-half	1976-77	1980-81	Later coached Bramley RLFC & Hull FC
365	Ernie Herbert	Stand-off	1933-34	1943-44	Older brother of Harry Herbert
1091	Aaron Heremaia	Stand-off, Scrum-half, Hooker	2011	2014	19 September 1982 (age 44) ‡
169	Tom Herridge	Forward	1907-08	1920-21	
970	Ian Herron	Wing, Fullback	2000	2000	1 October 1970 (age 56) ‡
882	Mark Hewitt	Scrum-half	1993-94	1997	17 March 1974 (age 52) ‡
983	Andrew Hick	Prop	2000	2000	11 February 1971 (age 55) ‡
798	Steve Hick	Fullback	1984-85	1992-93	‡
684	Merv Hicks	Centre, Second-row, Prop	1972-73	1977-78	
419	Fred Higginbottom		1941-42	1942-43	
1007	Liam Higgins	Prop	2003	2006	19 July 1983 (age 43) ‡
219	William Higgins	Centre, Wing	1912-13	1913-14	
67	F. Higham		1898–99	1899–1900	
301	J. Higo		1925-26	1926-27	
1022	Danny Hill	Second-row, Prop	2004	2006	31 October 1984 (age 42) ‡
1225	Harvie Hill	Prop	2026	present	3 September 2003 (age 23)‡
292	John Hilson		1924-25	1925-26	
551	Norman Hockley		1952-53	1964-65	
37	W. Hodgson		1896–97	1899–1900	
728	Dave Hodgson		1976-77	1977-78	
1060	Josh Hodgson	Hooker	2009	2009	31 October 1989 (age 37) ‡
384	Robert Hogg		1937-38	1946-47	
225	J. H. Holden		1913-14	1914-15	
168	William Holder	Forward	1907-08	1918-19	
562	Alan Holdstock		1954-55	1962-63	
237	Jack Holdsworth		1914-15	1923-24	
1100	Daniel Holdsworth	Stand-off, Scrum-half	2012	2014	27 April 1984 (age 42) ‡
591	Malcolm Holgate		1959-60	1960-61	
954	Stephen Holgate	Second-row, Prop	1999	1999	Died: 16 November 2021 (aged 49) ‡
234	J. A. Holliday		1914-15	1915-16	
600	Terry Hollindrake	Fullback, Wing, Centre	1960-61	1964-65	
12	Jack Holmes		1895–96	1990-91	Pre-Northern Union?
1213	Oliver Holmes	Loose forward, Second-row	2025	2025	7 August 1992 (age 34)
927	Steven Holmes	Fullback	1997	1997	Signed from North Queensland Cowboys
402	Jack Holt		1940-41	1942-43	
676	Andy Holt		1971-72	1974-75	
23	Ben Homan		1895–96	1896–97	Pre-Northern Union?
1166	Jacob Hookem	Hooker, Scrum-half, Stand-off	2021	2022	Left to join Castleford Tigers
437	Bruce Hooten		1942-43	1943-44	World War II Guest from Swinton
533	Bill Hopkins		1949-50	1957-58	
62	A. Hopper		1897–98	1899–1900	
1006	Graeme Horne	Centre, Prop, Second-row, Loose forward	2002	2009	22 March 1985 (age 41) ‡
958	Richard Horne	Scrum-half, Stand-off, Fullback, Centre	1999	2014	16 July 1982 (age 44) ‡
1045	Danny Houghton	Hooker	2007	2024	Retired after 2024 season 25 September 1988 (age 38) ‡
1125	Stuart Howarth	Hooker, Loose forward	2015	2015	25 January 1990 (age 36) ‡
272	George Howlett		1921-22	1924-25	
1181	Tex Hoy	Fullback, Stand-off	2023	2024	Left to join Castleford Tigers
138	J. Hufton		1904-05	1906-07	
548	P. Huggins		1951-52	1952-53	
201	F. Hughes		1911-12	1912-13	
241	Jack Hulme		1919-20	1920-21	
257	Jim Humphries		1920-21	1921-22	
942	Alan Hunte	Centre, Wing	1998	1998	11 July 1970 (age 56) ‡
706	Paul Hunter		1974-75	1978-79	
880	Paul Hunter		1992-93	1993-94	‡
381	Frank Hurley	Wing	1937-38	1940-41	Occasionally misnamed Fred
414	T. Hutchinson		1941-42	1942-43	
1215	Will Hutchinson		2025	present	
Pre-1895	William Henry Heap Hutchinson		c. 1875	c. 1875	Only Rugby Football Union?
543	Colin Hutton	Fullback, Centre	1950-51	1958-59	
633	Ken Huxley		1964-65	1973-74	
660	Paul Ibbertson		1968-69	1978-79	
407	Peter Ingram		1940-41	1949-50	
930	Andy Ireland	Prop	1997	1999	6 December 1971 (age 54) ‡
15	George Jacketts		1895–96	1900–01	Pre-Northern Union?
703	Robert Jacklin		1973-74	1975-76	
844	Anthony "Chico" Jackson		1989-90	1999	20 November 1969 (age 56) ‡ ‡
118	R. W. Jackson		1902-03	1905-06	
506	Duncan Jackson		1947-48	1951-52	
809	Lee Jackson	Hooker	1985-86	2002	12 March 1969 (age 57) ‡
3	Billy Jacques	Wing, Centre	1895–96	1902-03	Pre-Northern Union?
790	Kevin James	Wing	1984-85	1988-89	‡
1188	Zach Jebson		2023	present	9 May 2004 (age 22)
486	… Jeffries		1945-46	1946-47	
586	John Jenkins		1958-59	1960-61	
974	Mick Jenkins	Hooker	2000	2000	9 June 1972 (age 54) ‡
109	Chick Jenkins	Fullback, Centre	1902-03	1904-05	
286	Ernest Jenney		1924-25	1933-34	
658	David Jervis		1968-69	1972-73	
479	Robert Jewitt		1944-45	1949-50	
489	Stan Jimmeson		1945-46	1951-52	
107	T. John		1902-03	1903-04	
1233	Ben Johnson	Centre	2026	present	
1	W. Johnson		1895–96	1898–99	Pre-Northern Union?
88	C. H. Johnson		1900–01	1904-05	
253	W. Johnson		1919-20	1921-22	
596	David Johnson		1959-60	1963-64	
618	Frank Johnson		1963-64	1967-68	
934	Mark Johnson	Wing	1997	1998	28 February 1969 (age 57) ‡
1102	Paul Johnson	Prop, Loose forward	2012	2013	13 March 1988 (age 38) ‡
378	Thomas Johnson	Scrum-half	1936-37	1947-48	
1158	Jordan Johnstone	Hooker, Scrum-half	2020	2022	Left to rejoin Widnes Vikings
346	A.E. Jones		1932-33	1933-34	
152	E.W. Jones		1906-07	1907-08	
295	J.E. Jones		1925-26	1926-27	
175	J.M. Jones		1908-09	1909-10	
464	John Robert Jones		1945-46	1946-47	
1155	Josh Jones	Second-row, Centre, Loose forward	2020	2020	Left to join Huddersfield Giants
671	Les Jones		1970-71	1971-72	
863	Mark Jones	Prop, Second-row	1991-92	1995-96	22 June 1965 (age 61) ‡
518	William Jones		1948-49	1950-51	
1014	Warren Jowitt	Prop, Second-row, Loose forward	2003	2003	9 September 1974 (age 52) ‡
491	K. Joy		1946-47	1947-48	
393	Bob Kavanagh		1938-39	1949-50	
702	Barry Kear		1973-74	1975-76	
1029	Stephen Kearney	Second-row	2005	2005	11 June 1972 (age 54) ‡
588	Arthur Keegan	Fullback	1958-59	1971-72	
1137	Albert Kelly	Stand-off, Scrum-half	2017	2020	21 March 1991 (age 35) ‡
90	E.C. Kelsey		1901-02	1902-03	
765	Gary Kemble	Fullback	1981-82	1988-89	23 August 1956 (age 70) ‡
1209	Callum Kemp	Halfback	2024	present	
1211	Lloyd Kemp	Stand-off	2025	present	
537	George Kendall		1950-51		Trialist
674	Mick Kendle		1971-72	1976-77	
242	William "Billy" Kennedy		1919-20	1920-21	Brother of Jimmy Kennedy
240	Jimmy Kennedy		1915-16	1923-24	Brother of William Kennedy
1078	Liam Kent	Second-row	2010	2014	9 April 1991 (age 35) ‡
	Richard Kerman	Prop	1986-87	1988-89	‡
579	Jack Kershaw		1957-58	1964-65	
231	G. Kew		1913-14	1914-15	
836	Paddy Khan		1988-89	1990-91	‡
572	Brian Kielty		1956-57	1957-58	
137	George Kilburn		1904-05	1908-09	
667	Alan Kilby		1969-70	1970-71	
947	Paul King	Prop, Hooker, Second-row	1998	2009	28 June 1979 (age 47) ‡
49	R. Kirby		1897–98	1898–99	
1203	Will Kirby	Second-row, Prop	2024	2025	
662	Terry Kirchin		1969-70	1973-74	
193	W.H. Kirk		1910-11	1911-12	
816	John Kirkwood		1986-87	1987-88	‡
900	Chris Kitching	Fullback, Centre, Wing, Stand-off	1994-95	1997	1 August 1977 (age 49) ‡
540	Charlie Knapp		1950-51	1957-58	
1221	Liam Knight	Prop, Lock	2025	present	15 January 1995 (age 31)
997	Toa Kohe-Love	Centre	2002	2003	2 December 1976 (age 49) ‡
1175	Matty Laidlaw	Prop	2022	present	22 January 2004 (age 22)
297	John Lamping		1925-26	1926-27	
298	Joseph Lamping		1925-26	1926-27	
1115	Callum Lancaster	Wing	2014	2016	13 October 1996 (age 30) ‡
153	A. Land		1906-07	1907-08	
1142	Jordan Lane	Second-row	2017	2025	20 October 1997 (age 29) ‡
710	Steve Lane		1974-75	1976-77	
559	George Langfield	Fullback, Scrum-half	1953-54	1955-56	
115	W. Langhorn		1902-03	1905-06	
146	C. W. Larkins		1905-06	1906-07	
337	Charles Larvin		1930-31	1931-32	
964	Andy Last	Scrum-half, Hooker	1999	2005	25 March 1981 (age 45) ‡
1063	Epalahame Lauaki	Prop, Second-row	2009	2011	27 January 1984 (age 42) ‡
392	Ernie Lawrence		1938-39	1953-54	
454	J. Lawson		1943-44	1944-45	
554	Jimmy Lawson		1952-53	1961-62	
720	Colin Lazenby		1976-77	1986-87	‡
817	Tracy Lazenby	Stand-off, Loose forward	1986-87	1987-88	‡
933	Jim Leatham	Prop, Second-row, Loose forward	1997	1999	10 October 1974 (age 52) ‡
962	Rob Lee	Wing, Centre	1999	1999	‡
1032	Tommy Lee	Stand-off, Scrum-half, Hooker, Loose forward	2005	2009	1 February 1988 (age 38) ‡
2	Cyril Lemprière	Wing	1895–96	1901-02	Pre-Northern Union?
924	Gary Lester	Stand-off, Scrum-half	1997	1999	15 May 1972 (age 54) ‡
767	James Leuluai	Fullback, Wing, Centre, Stand-off	1981-82	1988-89	4 February 1957 (age 69) ‡
96	S. Lewis		1901-02	1902-03	
125	G. H. Lewis		1903-04	1905-06	
113	Jack Lewis		1902-03	1906-07	
841	David Liddiard	Fullback, Wing, Centre	1989-90	1990-91	24 February 1961 (age 65) ‡
923	Glen Liddiard	Fullback, Stand-off, Centre, Wing	1996	1997	Signed from South Queensland Crushers
1096	Tom Lineham	Wing	2011	2015	21 September 1991 (age 35) ‡
1227	Sam Lisone	Prop	2026	present	19 February 1994 (age 32)‡
1179	Davy Litten	Fullback, Wing	2022	present	3 May 2003 (age 23)
1139	Jez Litten	Hooker, Scrum-half	2017	2019	10 March 1998 (age 28) ‡
739	Sammy Lloyd	Wing, Second-row, Loose forward	1978-79	1983-84	‡
200	J. S. Lockwood		1910-11	1912-13	
41	G. William Lofthouse		1896–97	1900–01	
1118	Jack Logan	Wing, Centre	2014	2021	8 September 1995 (age 31) ‡
994	Scott Logan	Prop, Second-row	2001	2003	22 June 1976 (age 50) ‡
907	Matthew Long	Second-row, Prop	1995-96	1997	
1064	Sean Long	Scrum-half	2010	2011	24 September 1976 (age 50) ‡
290	Harry Longbottom		1924-25	1933-34	
1174	Ellis Longstaff	Second-row	2022	2022	Loaned from Warrington Wolves
284	W.R. Loveluck		1924-25	1925-26	
1169	Joe Lovodua	Scrum-half, Stand-off, Loose forward, Second-row	2022	2023	Left to join Doncaster RLFC
39	C. A. Low		1896–97	1900–01	
77	W.A Lowery		1899–1900	1900–01	
650	Mike Lunn		1966-67	1967-68	
1011	Peter Lupton	Centre, Scrum-half, Hooker, Loose forward	2003	2006	7 March 1982 (age 44) ‡
1081	Andy Lynch	Prop	2011	2013	20 October 1979 (age 47) ‡
1068	Reece Lyne	Fullback, Wing	2010	2012	2 December 1992 (age 33) ‡
723	Terry Lynn		1976-77	1979-80	
321	Hubert Lyon		1928-29	1932-33	
413	H. Lyon		1941-42	1942-43	
665	Paul Lytten		1969-70	1970-71	
996	Graham Mackay	Centre, Wing	2002	2002	12 October 1968 (age 58) ‡
847	Greg Mackey	Stand-off	1989-90	1993-94	Died: 24 September 2014 (aged 52) ‡
656	Alf Macklin		1968-69	1980-81	
612	Jim Macklin		1961-62	1975-76	
510	Bernard Madden		1947-48	1950-51	
762	Ian Madley	Second-row	1980-81	1984-85	‡
976	Adam Maher	Second-row	2000	2003	Died: 25 February 2020 (aged 47)‡
17	E. Mahoney	Second-row	1895–96	1900–01	Pre-Northern Union?
1039	Hutch Maiava	Prop	2007	2007	26 October 1976 (age 50) ‡
978	David Maiden	Centre, Second-row, Loose forward	2000	2001	7 August 1971 (age 55) ‡
142	Jack Major		1904-05	1909-10	
803	Billy Mallinson		1984-85	1987-88	‡
1059	Dominic Maloney	Prop	2009	2009	12 March 1987 (age 39) Grandson of John Maloney ‡
645	John Maloney	Centre	1965-66	1974-75	Grandfather of Dominic Maloney, 1,462 points between 1965 and 1971.
903	Terry Manning	Wing, Centre, Stand-off, Loose forward	1995-96	1996	
13	William Mansell		1895–96	1898–99	Pre-Northern Union?
1134	Viliami Sikalamu "Sika" Manu	Prop, Second-row, Loose forward	2016	2019	22 January 1987 (age 39) ‡
1041	Willie Manu	Centre, Second-row, Loose forward	2007	2012	20 March 1980 (age 46) ‡
192	John Markham		1910-11	1911-12	
408	R. Markham		1940-41	1941-42	
547	Harry Markham	Second-row	1951-52	1957-58	
149	H. Marland		1905-06	1906-07	
855	Ian Marlow	Second-row, Prop	1990-91	1993-94	18 January 1963 (age 63) ‡
682	Alf Marshall		1972-73	1976-77	
726	David Marshall		1976-77	1978-79	
443	Len Marson	Hooker, Loose forward	1942-43	1943-44	World War II guest player
1187	Lewis Martin	Wing	2023	present	19 August 2004 (age 22)
1080	Tony Martin	Centre	2011	2012	7 October 1978 (age 48) ‡
730	Alan Maskill		1977-78	1979-80	
269	P. Mason		1921-22	1922-23	
704	Graham Mason		1973-74	1974-75	
1231	Jeremiah Mata'utia	Prop	2026	2026	On loan from Leeds Rhinos
351	George Mathers		1932-33	1934-35	
43	R. Matterson		1897–98	1898–99	
583	George Matthews		1958-59	1963-64	
1130	Masimbaashe Matongo	Prop	2015	2021	15 May 1996 (age 30) ‡
1156	Manu Ma'u	Second-row	2020	2022	Left to join Catalans Dragons
822	Hussein M'Barki	Fullback	1987-88	1988-89	‡
373	Daniel McAvoy		1935-36	1936-37	
828	Paul McCaffery		1987-88	1988-89	14 September 1959 (age 67) ‡
807	Carl McCoid	Wing	1985-86	1987-88	‡
937	John McCracken	Fullback, Centre, Wing	1997	1997	
235	A. V. McDonald		1914-15	1915-16	
975	Wayne McDonald	Prop, Second-row	2000	2000	3 September 1975 (age 51) ‡
1097	Shannon McDonnell	Fullback	2012	2014	5 August 1987 (age 39) ‡
857	Damien McGarry	Wing, Centre	1990-91	1992-93	27 January 1968 (age 58) ‡
287	Tom McGiever		1924-25	1925-26	
625	Alan McGlone		1963-64	1975-76	
1092	Ryan McGoldrick	Fullback, Stand-off Utility Back	2011	2012	12 January 1981 (age 45) ‡
614	Kevin McGowan		1961-62	1966-67	
1167	Darnell McIntosh	Wing, Fullback	2022	2024	Left to join Leigh Leopards
501	R. McKenzie		1946-47	1947-48	
891	Leroy McKenzie	Wing	1994-95	1997	‡
1079	Wade McKinnon	Fullback	2011	2012	12 February 1981 (age 45) ‡
681	John McLane	Prop, Loose forward	1971-72	1972-73	
27	W. McLauchlan		1895–96	1897–98	Pre-Northern Union?
1161	Ben McNamara	Stand-off, Scrum-half, Hooker	2020	2023	Left to join Leigh Leopards
38	J. V. McManus		1896–97	1897–98	
1012	Shayne McMenemy	Second-row, Loose forward	2003	2007	9 July 1976 (age 50) ‡
840	Steve McNamara	Second-row, Loose forward	1989-90	1996	18 September 1971 (age 55) ‡
651	Ted McNamar		1966-67	1967-68	
1018	Paul McNicholas	Prop, Second-row	2004	2005	26 May 1975 (age 51) ‡
1069	Paul McShane	Hooker	2010	2010	16 November 1989 (age 36) ‡
622	Peter McVeigh		1963-64	1964-65	Loan
451	Wilf McWatt		1943-44	1944-45	World War II Guest from Hull KR
69	A. R. Meek		1898–99	1900–01	
18	Alf Mennell		1895–96	1896–97	Pre-Northern Union?
236	H. Mercer		1914-15	1915-16	
220	James Augustus "Gus" Merry	Centre, Wing	1912-13	1914-15	
327	Billy Metcalfe		1930-31	1933-34	
699	Ralph Michaels		1973-74	1975-76	
1123	Steven Michaels	Wing, Centre	2015	2017	13 January 1987 (age 39) ‡
848	Andrew Mighty		1989-90	1993-94	‡
304	Alec Miller		1926-27	1927-28	
98	Fred Miller	Forward	1901-02	1903-04	
358	Freddie Miller		1932-33	1950-51	
1107	Jacob Miller	Scrum-half	2013	2014	22 August 1992 (age 34) ‡
259	Jack Mills		1920-21	1921-22	
329	T. H. Mills		1930-31	1931-32	
328	W. A Mills		1930-31	1931-32	
399	Henry Mills		1939-40	1941-42	
462	Ronnie Mills		1943-44	1944-45	
326	J. W. Milner		1929-30	1931-32	
232	Tom Milner	Stand-off	1914-15	1919-20	Came from Dewsbury
1143	Hakim Miloudi	Fullback, Wing, Stand-off	2018	2019	26 June 1993 (age 33) ‡
1122	Mark Minichiello	Second-row	2015	2019	30 January 1982 (age 44) ‡
294	George S. Mitchell		1925-26	1926-27	
1058	Sam Moa	Prop	2009	2012	14 August 1986 (age 40) ‡
552	Rowley Moat		1952-53	1957-58	
914	David Moffat	Second-row, Prop	1996	1996	Not to be confused with David Moffatt
405	R. Monkhouse		1940-41	1941-42	
832	David Moon	Wing, Centre	1988-89	1989-90	28 May 1964 (age 62) ‡
644	David Moor		1965-66	1966-67	
532	Cyril Moore		1949-50	1950-51	
424	R.A. Moore		1941-42	1943-44	
94	James A Morgan		1901-02	1902-03	
106	Ivor Morgan		1902-03	1903-04	
302	J. S. Morgan		1926-27	1927-28	
266	Edgar Morgan	Second-row	1921-22	1926-27	
647	Ron Morgan		1966-67	1968-69	
492	F. Morland		1946-47	1947-48	
369	Wilf Morrell		1934-35	1936-37	
202	A. Morrod		1911-12	1912-13	
490	… Morton		1946-47	1947-48	
185	Andy Morton	Wing, Centre, Fullback	1909-10	1911-12	
466	… Mowforth		1943-44	1944-45	
74	A. J. Moxon		1899–1900	1904-05	
1198	Logan Moy	Fullback	2024	present	
792	John Muggleton	Second-row, Loose forward	1984-85	1986-87	16 January 1960 (age 66) ‡
951	Craig Murdock	Scrum-half	1998	1999	24 October 1973 (age 53) ‡
431	E. Murphy		1942-43	1943-44	
379	L. Murray		1936-37	1937-38	
429	Kit Napier		1942-43	1944-45	
624	Jim Neale		1963-64	1969-70	
417	Walter "Wally" Ness		1941-42	1945-46	a Wilfred "Wilf" Ness played centre for Castleford as a World War II guest on Monday 2 April 1945, it is likely that this is Walter "Wally" Ness.
1126	Curtis Naughton	Fullback, Wing	2015	2016	25 February 1995 (age 31) ‡
1148	Ratu Naulago	Wing, Centre	2019	2020	Left to join Bristol Bears
715	Ray Newby		1974-75	1976-77	
92	J. A. Newlove		1901-02	1902-03	
742	John Newlove	Stand-off, Centre, Wing	1978-79	1981-82	‡
1230	Harry Newman	Centre	2026	present	On loan from Leeds Rhinos, début v St Helens on 16 April 2026
245	Fred Newsome		1919-20	1921-22	
423	G. Nicholson		1941-42	1942-43	
592	Dennis Nicholson		1959-60	1960-61	
448	Bob Nicholson	Prop, Second-row	1942-43	1943-44	World War II guest player
1070	Danny Nicklas	Stand-off, Scrum-half	2010	2013	29 June 1991 (age 35) ‡
511	Bernard Nicklin		1947-48	1951-52	
615	Charlie Nimb		1962-63	1965-66	
499	A. Noble		1946-47	1947-48	
731	David Noble		1977-78	1978-79	
862	Gary Nolan	Centre, Fullback, Wing	1990-91	1995-96	31 May 1966 (age 60) ‡
834	Rob Nolan	Utility back	1988-89	1999	2 October 1968 (age 58) ‡
223	Ted Nolan		1912-13	1920-21	
810	Carl Norfolk		1986-87	1987-88	‡
521	George Northern		1948-49	1954-55	
134	W. Northrop		1904-05	1905-06	
736	Steve Norton	Second-row, Loose forward	1977-78	1987-88	‡
463	Eric Nowell		1943-44	1944-45	
545	David Nutland		1950-51	1952-53	
1152	Levy Nzoungou	Prop	2019	2019	Left to join Albi Tigers
639	Shaun O'Brien		1964-65	1975-76	
1074	Sam Obst	Stand-off, Scrum-half	2011	2011	26 November 1980 (age 45) ‡
1086	Eamon O'Carroll	Prop	2011	2012	13 June 1987 (age 39) ‡
870	Craig O'Donnell	Wing, Fullback	1992-93	1995-96	‡
673	Geoff O'Donnell		1971-72	1972-73	
766	Dane O'Hara	Wing, Centre	1981-82	1990-91	‡
949	Hitro Okesene	Prop, Hooker	1998	1998	22 September 1971 (age 55) ‡
229	Percy Oldham		1913-14	1916-17	
529	Pat O'Leary		1949-50	1953-54	
132	Fred Oliver		1904-05	1905-06	
265	George Oliver	Prop, Hooker	1921-22	1924-25	
318	Joe Oliver	Fullback, Centre	1928-29	1943-44	
643	Norman Oliver	Wing	1965-66	1971-72	
1065	Mark O'Meley	Prop, Loose forward	2010	2013	22 May 1981 (age 45) ‡
1232	Ethan O'Neill	Second-row	2026	present	Initially on loan from Leeds Rhinos, then permanent. 1 June 1999 (age 27)
1193	Jayden Okunbor	Wing, Centre, Second-row	2024	2024	Joined Bradford Bulls; 2 March 1997 (age 29)
354	Harry Orme		1932-33	1933-34	
158	William Thomas Osborne	Forward	1906-07	1910-11	
722	Henry Oulton		1976-77	1977-78	
362	Eric Overton		1934-35	1936-37	
653	Malcolm Owbridge		1967-68	1973-74	
170	James Owen		1907-08	1909-10	
641	Ken Owens		1964-65	1967-68	
1110	Mickey Paea	Prop	2013	2019	2 stints 25 March 1986 (age 40) ‡
1111	Iafeta Paleaaesina	Prop	2013	2016	Surname also spelt Palea'aesina 10 February 1982 (age 44) ‡
434	J. Parker		1942-43		
963	Paul Parker	Wing, Centre	1999	2002	13 February 1979 (age 47) ‡
164	R. A. Parkes		1907-08	1908-09	
68	R. Parkinson		1898–99	1903-04	
102	Laurie Parry		1901-02	1908-09	
800	Ian Patrick		1984-85	1986-87	‡
783	Shaun Patrick	Hooker	1983-84	1990-91	‡
375	Tom Pattinson		1936-37	1937-38	
517	John Payne		1948-49	1951-52	
748	Gary Peacham	Wing	1979-80	1982-83	‡
812	Peter Gareth Pearce	Stand-off, Hooker	1986-87	1990-91	11 November 1960 (age 66) ‡
191	C. Pearson		1910-11	1911-12	
640	Gary Pearson		1964-65	1969-70	
1192	Franklin Pele	Prop	2024	2024	18 December 2000 (age 25)
233	Fred Leonard Perrett	Forward	1914-15	1915-16	Died of wounds in France 1918
1075	Cameron Phelps	Fullback	2011	2011	11 February 1985 (age 41) ‡
312	Joe Phillipson		1927-28	1930-31	
965	Ian Pickavance	Prop, Second-row	1999	1999	20 September 1968 (age 58) ‡
743	Clive Pickerill	Scrum-half	1978-79	1982-83	‡
285	Stan Pickering		1924-25	1932-33	
623	Bill Pickersgill		1963-64	1964-65	
388	G. Pinder		1937-38	1944-45	
1088	Jay Pitts	Prop, Second-row, Loose forward	2011	2014	9 December 1989 (age 36) ‡
21	A. Plugge		1895–96	1898–99	Pre-Northern Union?
494	Bernard Poole	Second-row	1946-47	1950-51	
865	Wayne Portlock	Fullback	1991-92	1992-93	‡
797	Jimmy Portz		1984-85	1987-88	‡
678	Steve Portz		1971-72	1978-79	
959	Craig Poucher	Fullback, Wing	1999	2002	12 September 1980 (age 46) ‡
349	Albert Pougher		1932-33	1933-34	
741	Paul Prendiville	Wing, Centre	1978-79	1986-87	‡
939	Steve Prescott	Fullback, Wing	1998	2003	26 December 1973 ‡
821	Richard Price	Centre, Stand-off	1987-88	1992-93	26 June 1970 (age 56) ‡
1135	Frank Pritchard	Second-row, Loose forward	2016	2016	3 November 1983 (age 43) ‡
772	Wayne Proctor	Second-row, Centre	1982-83	1989-90	‡
1120	Leon Pryce	Stand-off	2015	2016	9 October 1981 (age 45) ‡
1222	Will Pryce	Stand-off, Halfback	2025	present	5 December 2002 (age 23) ‡ Son of Leon Pryce
616	Jim Puckering		1962-63	1964-65	
782	Neil Puckering	Prop	1983-84	1990-91	‡
151	W. H. Pullen		1906-07	1907-08	
955	Andrew Purcell	Stand-off, Hooker, Loose forward	1999	1999	20 May 1971 (age 55) ‡
187	G. R. Purcheon		1909-10	1910-11	
910	Lee Radford	Prop, Second-row, Loose forward	1996	2012	Later coached Hull FC; 26 March 1979 (age 47) ‡
422	Joe Ramsden		1941-42	1942-43	World War II Guest from Hull KR
713	Bill Ramsey	Prop, Second-row, Loose forward	1974-75	1976-77	Later coached Hunslet
1109	Jordan Rankin	Fullback, Centre, Stand-off, Scrum-half	2014	2015	17 December 1991 (age 34) ‡
1217	Jordan Rapana	Fullback, Wing	2025	2025	15 August 1989 (age 37)
1140	Nick Rawsthorne	Wing	2017	2017	Surname occasionally spelt Rawsthorn 30 September 1995 (age 31) ‡
993	Gareth Raynor	Wing, Centre	2001	2009	24 February 1978 (age 48) ‡
29	W. J. Read		1895–96	1901-02	Pre-Northern Union?
368	George Reed		1934-35	1935-36	
826	Terry Regan	Second-row, Prop	1987-88	1989-90	21 May 1958 (age 68) ‡
1202	Ben Reynolds	Stand-off, Scrum-half	2024	2024	Loaned from Hull KR 15 January 1994 (age 32)
1162	Josh Reynolds	Stand-off, Hooker	2021	2022	Left to join Canterbury Bulldogs
606	Mick Reynolds		1961-62	1962-63	
46	Dick Rhodes		1897–98	1907-08	
52	Jack Rhodes		1897–98	1898–99	
987	Scott Rhodes	Scrum-half, Stand-off	2000	2000	21 June 1980 (age 46) ‡
359	James Richardson		1933-34	1934-35	
896	Lee Richardson	Hooker	1994-95	1996	‡
560	Len Richardson		1953-54	1960-61	
556	Bill Riches		1953-54	1956-57	
34	Jack H. Rippon		1895–96	1900–01	Pre-Northern Union?
Pre-1895	Thomas Ripton		c. 1891–92	≥c. 1891–92	Only Rugby Football Union?
99	Jack Ritson		1901-02	1904-05	
957	Rob Roberts	Second-row, Loose forward, Prop	1999	1999	21 June 1978 (age 48) ‡
124	A. Robinson		1903-04	1904-05	
474	J. Robinson		1945-46	1946-47	
718	George Robinson	Fullback	1975-76	1985-86	‡
982	Will Robinson	Centre, Stand-off, Scrum-half, Hooker	2000	2000	20 February 1971 (age 55) ‡
664	Don Robson		1969-70	1976-77	
159	Ned Rogers		1906-07	1923-24	
119	Gregor Rogers		1902-03		
1223	Arthur Romano	Wing, Centre	2026	present	17 August 1997 (age 29)
866	David Ronson	Wing, Centre	1991-92	1993-94	13 January 1967 (age 59) ‡
897	Gary Rose	Prop, Second-row	1994-95	1996	25 July 1965 (age 61) ‡
775	Paul Rose	Prop, Second-row	1982-83	1986-87	‡
608	Wilf Rosenberg	Centre, Wing	1961-62	1965-66	
628	Brian Rowe		1963-64	1965-66	
1205	Leon Ruan	Second-row, Centre	2024	2024	14 May 2003 (age 23)
523	Dennis Rushton		1948-49	1951-52	
876	Nicky Rushton	Prop	1992-93	1993-94	‡
1090	Matty Russell	Fullback	2011	2012	6 June 1993 (age 33) ‡
505	Bruce Ryan	Wing	1947-48	1950-51	
1000	Sean Ryan	Second-row, Loose forward	2002	2003	23 August 1973 (age 53) ‡
1116	Setaimata Sa	Centre, Second-row	2014	2015	14 September 1987 (age 39) ‡
1216	Hugo Salabio	Prop	2025	present	27 July 2000 (age 26)
694	Tony Salmon		1972-73	1980-81	
139	T. Salt		1904-05	1905-06	
981	Ben Sammut	Fullback, Hooker, Stand-off	2000	2000	13 February 1975 (age 51) ‡
635	Malcolm Sampson	Prop	1964-65	1965-66	Loan
274	Thomas Frederick Samuel	Fullback	1922-23	1923-24	
502	Les Sanders		1946-47	1951-52	
75	R. W. Sanderson		1899–1900	1900–01	
1157	Ligi Sao	Prop, Loose forward	2020	present	
1154	Chris Satae	Prop	2019	2023	Left to join Catalans Dragons
45	Tom Savage		1897–98	1900–01	
1149	Andre Savelio	Second-row, Prop	2019	2023	Left to join Huddersfield Giants
573	Brian Saville		1956-57	1961-62	
1027	Tommy Saxton	Fullback, Wing, Centre	2005	2005	3 October 1983 (age 43) ‡
761	David Schofield	Hooker	1980-81	1981-82	‡
209	E.J. Schofield		1911-12		
781	Garry Schofield	Centre, Stand-off	1983-84	1987-88	1 July 1965 (age 61) ‡
925	Matt Schultz	Second-row	1997	2000	9 August 1975 (age 51) ‡
1144	Cameron Scott	Centre	2018	2024	Joined Wakefield Trinity; 7 October 1999 (age 27) ‡
530	Fred Scott		1949-50	1950-51	
522	Michael Scott	Prop, Second-row	1948-49	1963-64	
760	Ian Scruton	Wing	1980-81	1983-84	‡
1023	Nick Scruton	Prop	2004	2004	24 December 1984 (age 41) ‡
122	F. Sedgwick		1903-04	1904-05	
909	Lance Sedman		1996	1996	
940	Fili Seru	Wing, Centre, Stand-off	1998	1999	11 March 1970 (age 56) ‡
1176	Charlie Severs	Second-row	2022	present	1 October 2003 (age 23)
1083	Brett Seymour	Stand-off, Scrum-half	2011	2013	27 September 1984 (age 42) ‡
1219	Aidan Sezer	Scrum-half, Stand-off	2025	present	24 June 1991 (age 35)
495	Alf Shakesby		1946-47	1948-49	
87	J. Sharp		1900–01	1901-02	
333	F. Sharp		1930-31	1931-32	
794	Jon Sharp	Loose forward	1984-85	1995-96	8 March 1967 (age 59) ‡ ‡
1072	Will Sharp	Wing	2011	2012	13 May 1986 (age 40) ‡
428	L. Sharpe		1942-43	1943-44	
1103	Jamie Shaul	Fullback, Wing	2012	2023	1 July 1992 (age 34) ‡
78	J. Shaw		1899–1900	1900–01	
155	E. Shaw		1906-07	1907-08	
687	Bob Shaw		1972-73	1973-74	
441	Stan Shaw		1942-43	1951-52	
357	Billy Sheard		1933-34	1934-35	
254	Edwin Cox Shields		1920-21	1921-22	
482	Tom Shields		1945-46	1946-47	
488	Fred Shillito		1945-46	1948-49	
310	Malcolm Short		1927-28	1931-32	
66	Graham Sillis		1898–99	1904-05	
1173	Josh Simm	Centre, Wing	2022	2022	Loaned from St Helens
971	Craig Simon	Centre, Stand-off	2000	2000	17 April 1973 (age 53) ‡
493	Alan Sinclair		1946-47	1950-51	
1037	Matt Sing	Fullback, Wing	2007	2008	13 March 1975 (age 51) ‡
754	Trevor Skerrett	Prop, Second-row	1980-81	1986-87	‡
404	Ernie Smailes		1940-41	1941-42	
123	J. Small		1903-04	1904-05	
277	Jack Smallwood		1922-23	1925-26	
864	Terry Smirk	Stand-off, Scrum-half	1991-92	1996	‡
51	J.W. Smith		1897–98	1899–1900	
222	J.P. Smith		1912-13	1913-14	
421	J.W. Smith		1941-42	1942-43	
917	Andy Smith	Second-row, Centre, Loose forward	1996	1997	16 July 1970 (age 56) ‡
988	Chris Smith	Wing	2001	2002	30 October 1975 (age 51) ‡
397	Jack Smith		1939-40	1940-41	
946	Jamie Smith	Fullback, Wing, Centre	1998	1999	2 October 1976 (age 50) ‡
991	Jason Smith	Stand-off, Scrum-half, Loose forward	2001	2004	14 March 1972 (age 54) ‡
571	John Smith		1956-57	1962-63	
599	Michael Smith	Second-row	1959-60	1963-64	
956	Michael Smith	Second-row, Prop	1999	1999	10 May 1977 (age 49) ‡
1189	Morgan Smith	Stand-off, Scrum-half, Hooker	2024	2024	Joined Sheffield Eagles; 30 April 1998 (age 28)
990	Tony Smith	Scrum-half, Stand-off, Hooker	2000	2003	‡
1177	Will Smith	Fullback, Stand-off, Hooker, Scrum-half	2022	2022	3 July 1992 (age 34)
1121	Marc Sneyd	Stand-off, Scrum-half	2015	2021	9 February 1991 (age 35) ‡
780	Patrick Solal	Wing	1982-83	1984-85	6 March 1961 (age 65) ‡
47	B. Soulsby		1897–98	1898–99	
48	James Sowerby		1897–98	1904-05	
350	James E. Sowerby		1932-33	1934-35	
481	Bernard Spamer		1945-46	1946-47	
14	F. Spenceley		1895–96	1905-06	Pre-Northern Union?
320	W. Spencer		1928-29	1929-30	
867	Peter Spring	Prop	1991-92	1992-93	30 May 1962 (age 64) ‡
538	George Stainforth		1950-51	1955-56	
557	James Staples		1953-54	1954-55	
636	Cliff Stark		1964-65	1965-66	
1186	Nick Staveley	Centre, Second-row	2023	2025	19 January 2004 (age 22)
343	Billy Stead		1931-32	1937-38	
693	Ian Stenton	Centre	1972-73	1976-77	
918	Gareth Stephens	Stand-off, Scrum-half	1996	1996	Occasionally misnamed Gary (his father's name)
268	R. Stephenson		1921-22	1922-23	
403	J.H. Stephenson		1940-41	1941-42	
948	David Stephenson	Fullback	1998	1998	6 October 1972 (age 54) ‡
716	Mike Stephenson		1975-76	1979-80	Previously at Hull Kingston Rovers
885	Paul Sterling	Wing	1993-94	1996	2 August 1964 (age 62) ‡
787	Peter Sterling	Stand-off, Scrum-half	1983-84	1985-86	16 June 1960 (age 66) ‡
868	Ian Stevens	Stand-off, Centre, Wing	1991-92	1995-96	‡
183	Graham Stevenson		1909-10	1910-11	
82	Tom Stitt		1900–01	1902-03	
626	Geoff Stocks		1963-64	1969-70	
246	William "Billy" Stone	Wing, Centre, Fullback	1919-20	1927-28	
738	Charlie Stone	Prop, Second-row	1978-79	1985-86	‡
607	Malcolm Storey		1961-62	1964-65	
453	G.K. Storry		1943-44	1944-45	
889	Tim Street	Prop	1993-94	1996	29 June 1968 (age 58) ‡
444	… Stringer		1942-43	1943-44	
774	Carl Suddaby		1981-82	1983-84	‡
613	Brian Sullivan		1961-62	1967-68	
609	Clive Sullivan	Wing	1961-62	1985-86	9 April 1943 ‡
500	Joe Sullivan		1946-47	1950-51	
878	Scott Sullivan	Wing	1992-93	1993-94	‡
1182	Liam Sutcliffe	Fullback, Centre, Stand-off, Scrum-half, Second-row	2023	2024	Joined Huddersfield Giants; 25 November 1994 (age 31)
144	F. Sutton		1905-06	1906-07	
729	Mick Sutton	Prop	1977-78	1988-89	‡
319	Tom Sutton		1928-29	1929-30	born c. 1910, father of Tommy Sutton
590	Tommy Sutton		1958-59	1961-62	Son of Thomas "Tom" H. Sutton
1017	Richard Swain	Hooker	2004	2007	2 July 1975 (age 51) ‡
476	Sam Sweeting		1945-46	1946-47	
1159	Adam Swift	Wing	2020	2023	Left to join Huddersfield Giants
173	James Swinbank		1908-09	1909-10	
198	Eddie Sykes		1910-11	1911-12	
570	Cyril Sykes	Wing, Centre	1956-57	1968-69	
1108	Fetuli Talanoa	Wing, Centre	2014	2019	23 November 1987 (age 38) ‡
55	Jim Tanner		1897–98	1901-02	
1062	Jordan Tansey	Fullback, Stand-off, Scrum-half	2009	2011	9 September 1986 (age 40) ‡
250	N. Tate		1919-20	1920-21	
497	Ted Tattersfield	Second-row, Loose forward	1946-47	1947-48	
260	H. Taylor		1920-21	1921-22	
56	Harry Taylor	Fullback	1897–98	1912-13	Later coached Hull FC
270	Joe Taylor		1921-22	1922-23	Also for Wakefield Trinity? (1906–13) Joseph Taylor
323	J. Taylor		1929-30	1930-31	
256	Bob Taylor	Second-row	1920-21	1930-31	
406	Robert "Bob" Taylor		1940-41	1948-49	Son of Bob Taylor and brother of Fred Taylor
188	Dick Taylor		1909-10	1915-16	
1133	Scott Taylor	Prop	2016	2023	27 February 1991 (age 35) ‡
212	Tom Taylor		1911-12	1912-13	
345	Billy Teall	Fullback	1931-32	1934-35	
944	Jason Temu	Prop	1998	1998	17 April 1972 (age 54) ‡
360	Laurie Thacker	Prop	1933-34	1946-47	
1043	Anthony Thackeray	Scrum-half	2007	2007	19 February 1986 (age 40) ‡
1028	Jamie Thackray	Prop	2005	2009	30 September 1979 (age 47) ‡
341	Joseph Thames		1931-32	1932-33	
374	Eddie Thomas		1935-36	1936-37	Could this be Ned Thomas?
16	H. Thompson		1895–96	1896–97	Pre-Northern Union?
63	Jack T. Thompson		1898–99	1905-06	
331	Frank Thompson		1930-31	1933-34	
485	R. Thompson		1945-46	1946-47	
1112	Jordan Thompson	Centre, Prop, Second-row, Loose forward	2013	2017	4 September 1991 (age 35) ‡
1057	Chris Thorman	Stand-off, Scrum-half	2009	2009	26 September 1980 (age 46) ‡
305	W.W. Thornton		1926-27	1927-28	
1038	Danny Tickle	Second-row, Loose forward	2007	2013	8 April 1983 (age 43) ‡
456	… Tidy		1943-44	1944-45	
401	Jack Tindall		1939-40	1951-52	
677	Keith Tindall	Prop	1971-72	1985-86	‡
1197	Liam Tindall	Wing	2024	2024	Joined London Broncos; 27 September 2001 (age 25)
261	George Todd		1920-21	1921-22	
32	T. Tomlinson		1895–96	1898–99	Pre-Northern Union?
93	W. Tomlinson		1901-02	1902-03	
788	Alan Tomlinson	Prop	1983-84	1989-90	‡
943	Glen Tomlinson	Scrum-half, Stand-off	1998	1998	18 March 1970 (age 56) ‡
690	Kevin Tommerup		1972-73	1973-74	
1025	Motu Tony	Fullback, Wing, Centre, Stand-off, Scrum-half, Hooker	2005	2009	29 May 1981 (age 45) ‡
764	David Topliss	Stand-off	1981-82	1985-86	29 December 1949 ‡
6	Charles Townend		1895–96	1898–99	Pre-Northern Union?
4	Jack Townend		1895–96	1902-03	Pre-Northern Union?
1008	Dean Treister	Hooker	2003	2003	19 December 1975 (age 50) ‡
535	Jimmy Trelore		1950-51	1951-52	Loan
550	Albert Tripp		1952-53	1957-58	
646	Nick Trotter		1965-66	1977-78	
57	J. Troupe		1897–98	1898–99	
72	R. Trowell		1899–1900	1902-03	
1185	Jake Trueman	Hooker	2023	2024	Joined Wakefield Trinity; 16 February 1999 (age 27)
1132	Carlos Tuimavave	Centre, Stand-off	2016	2024	Joined Featherstone Rovers; 10 January 1992 (age 34) ‡
1124	Jansin Turgut	Centre, Second-row	2015	2018	8 March 1996 (age 30) ‡
520	Carl Turner		1948-49	1959-60	
735	Glyn Turner	Centre, Stand-off	1977-78	1980-81	
1067	Jordan Turner	Fullback, Centre, Stand-off	2010	2012	9 January 1989 (age 37) ‡
849	Neil Turner	Wing	1989-90	1993-94	‡
1113	Chris Tuson	Second-row	2013	2014	25 February 1990 (age 36) ‡
1127	Bobby Tyson-Wilson	Prop, Second-row	2013	2015	Son of Robert Wilson, brother of Harry Tyson-Wilson - Statistics at rugbyleagueproject.org 6 November 1994 (age 32) ‡
1119	Harry Tyson-Wilson	Scrum-half	2013	2016	Son of Robert Wilson, brother of Bobby Tyson-Wilson 29 December 1996 (age 29) ‡
895	Tevita Vaikona	Centre	1994-95	1997	18 August 1974 (age 52) ‡
786	Stuart Vass	Centre	1983-84	1988-89	‡
61	G. Voyce		1897–98	1901-02	
1163	Mitieli Vulikijapani	Wing, Centre	2021	2023	27 June 1994 (age 32)
1204	King Vuniyayawa	Second-row, Prop	2024	2024	On loan from Salford Red Devils 13 March 1995 (age 31)
101	J. Wade		1901-02	1903-04	
804	Stuart Wainman		1984-85	1986-87	‡
161	L. Walford		1906-07	1907-08	
1165	Marcus Walker	Centre	2021	2022	Left to join Newcastle Thunder
103	W. Walker		1901-02	1902-03	Only appearance 30 November 1901
426	Frank Walker		1941-42	1943-44	Also for Castleford? Frank Walker
1172	Jack Walker	Fullback	2024	2024	Joined Sheffield Eagles; 8 August 1999 (age 27)
680	Malcolm Walker		1971-72	1978-79	
852	Russ Walker	Prop, Second-row	1989-90	1996	Later coached Hull FC 1994-95; 1 September 1962 (age 64) ‡
154	Harry Wallace	Stand-off, Scrum-half	1906-07	1910-11	Killed in France May 1917
539	Emlyn Walters	Wing	1950-51	1951-52	Also for Bradford Northern
750	Graham Walters	Wing, Centre	1979-80	1982-83	‡
598	Ralph Walters		1959-60	1964-65	
698	Brian Waltham		1973-74	1976-77	
179	Harry Walton		1908-09	1910-11	
582	Eddie Wanklyn		1958-59	1960-61	
1210	Joe Ward	Wing	2025	present	
689	Alan Wardell		1972-73	1978-79	
581	Peter Warters		1957-58	1959-60	
1031	Danny Washbrook	Stand-off, Hooker, Second-row, Loose forward	2005	2011	18 September 1985 (age 41) ‡
549	Jack Watkinson	Fullback	1952-53	1957-58	
247	E. Watson		1919-20	1920-21	
919	Chris Watson	Scrum-half, Hooker	1996	1996	
508	George Watt	Hooker	1947-48	1951-52	
484	Ivor Watts	Wing	1945-46	1960-61	
1092	Liam Watts	Prop	2011	2018	8 July 1990 (age 36) ‡
136	H. Wear		1904-05	1905-06	
854	Bradley Webb	Centre	1990-91	1992-93	13 March 1965 (age 61) ‡
912	David Webber	Stand-off	1996	1996	Signed from South Sydney Rabbitohs, later went to Hull KR
221	H. Webster		1912-13	1913-14	
1055	James Webster	Scrum-half	2008	2008	11 July 1979 (age 47) ‡
793	Paul Welham		1984-85	1992-93	‡
160	B. Wellock		1906-07	1907-08	
1004	Dwayne West	Wing	2003	2003	8 June 1980 (age 46) ‡
1073	Joe Westerman	Stand-off, Second-row, Loose forward	2011	2019	15 November 1989 (age 37) ‡
1208	Ryan Westerman	Centre	2024	present	
1035	Scott Wheeldon	Prop	2006	2008	23 February 1986 (age 40) ‡
89	J. Wheeler		1900–01	1902-03	
928	Peter Wheeler	Scrum-half	1997	1997	Signed from Canterbury Bulldogs
427	George White		1942-43	1943-44	World War II Guest from Hull KR
611	Trevor Whitehead		1961-62	1964-65	
541	Johnny Whiteley	Loose forward, Second-row	1950-51	1965-66	Later coached Hull FC & Hull KR
578	Peter Whiteley		1957-58	1964-65	
1019	Richard Whiting	Fullback, Wing, Centre, Stand-off, Second-row, Loose forward	2004	2015	20 December 1984 (age 41) ‡
367	Len Whittaker		1934-35	1935-36	
251	Stan Whitty	Scrum-half	1919-20	1930-31	
751	Tim Wilby	Centre	1979-80	1990-91	13 March 1958 (age 68) ‡
189	S. Wileman		1909-10	1910-11	
746	Ron Wileman	Hooker	1979-80	1984-85	‡
19	Herbert Wiles		1895–96	1904-05	Pre-Northern Union?
1010	Alex Wilkinson	Fullback, Wing, Centre	2003	2004	9 October 1982 (age 44) ‡
352	Charlie Wilkinson		1932-33	1935-36	
398	Harry Wilkinson		1939-40	1952-53	Is this Harry Wilkinson?
31	Tom Wilkinson		1895–96	1898–99	Pre-Northern Union?
105	J.P. Williams		1902-03	1903-04	
411	J. Williams		1941-42	1942-43	
1048	Danny Williams	Wing	2008	2008	26 September 1986 (age 40) ‡
683	Graham Williams		1972-73	1973-74	Also for Swinton, North Sydney, Manly? Graham Williams
799	Paul Willingham		1984-85	1986-87	‡
685	Mark Willoughby	Second-row, Prop	1972-73	1973-74	
35	J. Wilson		1896–97	1900–01	
79	W. J. Wilson		1899–1900	1901-02	
410	W. Wilson		1941-42	1947-48	
980	Craig Wilson	Second-row	2000	2000	21 September 1969 (age 57) ‡
737	Ian Wilson	Stand-off	1977-78	1981-82	‡
567	John Wilson		1955-56	1956-57	
901	Richard Wilson	Prop	1994-95	1999	5 February 1975 (age 51) ‡
869	Robert Wilson	Second-row	1991-92	1995-96	31 August 1972 (age 54) ‡
370	Sidney Wilson		1934-35	1939-40	
898	Johan Windley	Scrum-half	1994-95	1999	‡
802	Phil Windley	Scrum-half	1984-85	1991-92	7 January 1962 (age 64) ‡
459	… Winfield		1943-44	1944-45	
313	Fred Winsor		1928-29	1931-32	
127	F. Wood		1903-04	1904-05	
340	Fred Wood		1931-32	1932-33	
182	J. Woodcock		1908-09	1909-10	
84	H. Woodhead		1900–01	1902-03	
749	Paul Woods	Fullback, Stand-off, Scrum-half	1979-80	1981-82	28 October 1950 ‡
480	Mick Worthy		1945-46	1946-47	
332	G. E. Wray		1930-31	1931-32	
383	Ernest Wray		1937-38	1946-47	
5	D. Wright		1895–96	1896–97	Pre-Northern Union?
238	James “Danny” Wyburn		1914-15	1922-23	
1150	Connor Wynne	Centre, Fullback, Wing	2019	2023	Left to join Featherstone Rovers
995	Kirk Yeaman	Wing, Centre, Second-row	2001	2018	15 September 1983 (age 43) ‡
206	M. Yewlett		1911-12	1912-13	
734	Phil Young		1977-78	1978-79	Also for Canterbury Bulldogs, Newtown Jets?

- ^¹ = Played For Hull F.C. During More Than One Period
- ^² = Prior to the 1974–75 season all goals, whether; conversions, penalties, or drop-goals, scored two points, consequently prior to this date drop-goals were often not explicitly documented, and "0²" indicates that drop-goals may not have been recorded, rather than no drop-goals scored. In addition, prior to the 1949–50 season, the Field-goal was also still a valid means of scoring points
- ^³ = During the first two seasons of the Northern Union (now known as the Rugby Football League), i.e. the 1895–96 season and 1896–97 season, conversions were worth 2-points, penalty goals 3-points and drop goals 4-points
- ¢ = player has (potential) links to other rugby league clubs on Wikipedia
- BBC = BBC2 Floodlit Trophy
- CC = Challenge Cup
- CF = Championship Final
- CM = Captain Morgan Trophy
- RT = League Cup, i.e. Player's No. 6, John Player (Special), Regal Trophy
- YC = Yorkshire County Cup
- YL = Yorkshire League
