= Feetham (surname) =

Feetham is an English surname that may refer to

- Daniel Feetham (born 1967), Gibraltarian politician and lawyer
- Edward Feetham (1863–1918), British Army officer
- Richard Feetham (1874–1965), South African lawyer, politician and judge
  - Feetham Function Committee in India
- John Feetham (disambiguation) – multiple people
- William Feetham, English rugby league footballer who played in the 1890s
