= 1990–91 Rugby League Premiership =

1991 Premiership
- Structure: National knockout championship
- Winners: Hull F.C.
- Runners-up: Widnes

The 1991 Rugby League Premiership was the 17th end-of-season Rugby League Premiership competition. The winners were Hull FC.

== First round ==
Date	Team one	Team two	Score
21 April 1991	Castleford	Leeds	20-24
21 April 1991	Hull F.C.	St Helens	28-12
21 April 1991	Widnes	Bradford Northern	46-10
21 April 1991	Wigan	Featherstone Rovers	26-31

== Semi-finals ==
Date	Team one	Team two	Score
5 May 1991	Hull F.C.	Leeds	10-7
5 May 1991	Widnes	Featherstone Rovers	42-28

== Final ==
12 May 1991

Hull F.C.	14-4	Widnes
T-Gay, Nolan G, Walker; G-Eastwood		T-Offiah

Old Trafford
Attendance: 42,043
Referee: John Holdsworth
Player of the Match: Greg Mackey

1	Richard Gay
2	Paul Eastwood
3	Damien McGarry
4	Brad Webb
5	Neil Turner
6	Greg Mackey
7	Patrick Entat
8	Karl Harrison
9	Lee Jackson
10	Andy Dannatt
11	Ian Marlow
12	Russ Walker
13	Jon Sharp
Substitutions:
14	Gary Nolan for Damien McGarry
15	Dean Busby for Ian Marlow
Coach:
Noel Cleal

1	Alan Tait
2	John Devereux
3	Andy Currier
4	Jonathan Davies
5	Martin Offiah
6	Barry Dowd
7	David Hulme
8	Kurt Sorensen
9	Phil McKenzie
10	Joey Grima
11	Paul Hulme
12	Emosi Koloto
13	Steve McCurrie
Substitutions:
14	Darren Wright for Phil McKenzie
15	Harvey Howard for Emosi Koloto
Coach:
Doug Laughton
