= H. Thompson =

H. Thompson may refer to:

- H. Thompson (rugby league), rugby league footballer
- H. Thompson (Sheffield cricketer), English cricketer
- H. S. Thompson (1824–?), American songwriter

== See also ==
- Thompson (surname)
