= Ian Stephens =

Ian Stephens or Ian Stevens may refer to:

- Ian Stephens (artist) (active since 1971), Australian artist
- Ian Stephens (editor) (1903–1984), editor of The Statesman, Kolkata, India
- Ian Stevens (footballer) (born 1966), English former footballer
- Ian Stephens (poet) (1955–1996), Canadian poet, journalist and musician
- Ian Stevens (rugby league), 1990s Wales rugby league footballer
- Ian Stephens (rugby union) (born 1952), former Wales international rugby union player
- Ian Stevens (rugby union) (born 1948), New Zealand rugby union footballer
