= Alan Banks =

Alan Banks is the name of:

- Inspector Alan Banks, fictional protagonist of Peter Robinson's series of novels
- Alan Banks (footballer) (1938–2026), English professional footballer
- Alan Banks (rugby league) (born 1965), English rugby league footballer of the 1980s and 1990s
