= 1938–39 Yorkshire Cup =

- Structure: Regional knockout championship
- Teams: 15
- Winners: Huddersfield
- Runners-up: Hull

The 1938–39 Yorkshire Cup, was the thirty-first occasion on which the Yorkshire County Cup competition was held.

The previous year's defeated finalists returned for a second year, but this year they were triumphant, Huddersfield winning the trophy by beating Hull F.C. by the score of 18–10.

The match was played at Odsal in the City of Bradford, now in West Yorkshire. The attendance was 28,714 and receipts were £1,534.

For the losers, Hull FC, it was to be their fifth defeat in six appearances in the Yorkshire Cup final.

== Background ==
This season there were no junior/amateur clubs taking part, no new entrants but Newcastle folded and so there is one less entrant, reducing the total number to fifteen.

This in turn resulted in one bye in the first round.

== Competition and results ==
=== Round 1 ===
Involved 7 matches (with one bye) and 15 clubs

Game No	Fixture date	Home team	Score	Away team	Venue	Ref
1	Sat 10 Sep 1938	Bradford Northern	7–20	Hunslet	Odsal	
2	Sat 10 Sep 1938	Featherstone Rovers	4–43	Leeds	Post Office Road	
3	Sat 10 Sep 1938	Halifax	9–9	Batley	Thrum Hall	
4	Sat 10 Sep 1938	Huddersfield	32–8	Dewsbury	Fartown	
5	Sat 10 Sep 1938	Hull	17–10	Bramley	Boulevard	
6	Sat 10 Sep 1938	Hull Kingston Rovers	12–0	Castleford	Craven Park (1)	
7	Sat 10 Sep 1938	York	14–28	Keighley	Clarence Street	
8		Wakefield Trinity		bye		

=== Round 1 - replays ===
Involved 1 match and 2 clubs

Game No	Fixture date	Home team	Score	Away team	Venue	Ref
R	Wed 14 Sep 1938	Batley	0–16	Halifax	Mount Pleasant	

=== Round 2 – quarterfinals ===
Involved 4 matches and 8 clubs

Game No	Fixture date	Home team	Score	Away team	Venue	Ref
1	Mon 19 Sep 1938	Halifax	8–14	Wakefield Trinity	Thrum Hall	
2	Mon 19 Sep 1938	Hunslet	23–7	Hull Kingston Rovers	Parkside	
3	Tue 20 Sep 1938	Hull	8–0	Keighley	Boulevard	
4	Wed 21 Sep 1938	Huddersfield	8–6	Leeds	Fartown	

=== Round 3 – semifinals ===
Involved 2 matches and 4 clubs

Game No	Fixture date	Home team	Score	Away team	Venue	Ref
1	Wed 5 Oct 1938	Huddersfield	6–2	Wakefield Trinity	Fartown	
2	Thu 6 Oct 1938	Hull	18–2	Hunslet	Boulevard	

=== Final ===
Game No	Fixture date	Home team	Score	Away team	Venue	Att	Rec	Notes	Ref
	Saturday 22 October 1938	Huddersfield	18–10	Hull	Odsal	28714	1534	(Note: Odsal is the home ground of Bradford Northern from 1890 to 2010 and the current capacity is in the region of 26,000, The ground is famous for hosting the largest attendance at an English sports ground when 102,569 (it was reported that over 120,000 actually attended as several areas of boundary fencing collapse under the sheer weight of numbers) attended the replay of the Challenge Cup final on 5 May 1954 to see Halifax v Warrington.)	

==== Teams and scorers ====
Huddersfield	No.	Hull
	Teams	
William Taylor	1	Freddie Miller
Bill Johnson	2	Frank Hurley
Dennis Madden	3	Bob Corner
Alex Fiddes	4	Sydney Wilson
Ray Markham	5	Eric Overton
Stan Pepperell	6	Ernie Herbert
Tom Grahame	7	Tom Johnson
Herbert Sherwood	8	Laurie Thacker
Harold Whitehead	9	George Barlow
David Morgan Evans	10	Lawrence Barlow
Emlyn Hughes	11	Charlie Booth
Jack Shaw	12	Jack Dawson
Ron Bailey	13	Harold Ellerington
??	Coach	??
18	score	10
10	HT	2
	Scorers	
	Tries	
E. T. Markham (3)	T	
Dennis Madden (1)	T	
	Goals	
Alex Fiddes (2)	G	
Dennis Madden (1)	G	
Referee		F. Fairhurst (Wigan)

Scoring - Try = three (3) points - Goal = two (2) points - Drop goal = two (2) points

=== The road to success ===
First round
Huddersfield	32
Dewsbury	8
Featherstone Rovers	4
Leeds	43
Halifax	9 (16)
Batley	9 (0)
Wakefield Trinity
bye
Hull	17
Bramley	10
York	14
Keighley	28
Bradford Northern	7
Hunslet	20
Hull Kingston Rovers	12
Castleford	0

Second round
Huddersfield	8
Leeds	6
Halifax	8
Wakefield Trinity	14
Hull	8
Keighley	0
Hunslet	23
Hull Kingston Rovers	7

Semifinals
Huddersfield	6
Wakefield Trinity	2
Hull	18
Hunslet	2

Final
Huddersfield	18
Hull	10

== See also ==
- 1938–39 Northern Rugby Football League season
- Rugby league county cups
