= Paris Châtillon XIII =

French rugby league club

Club information
- Full name: Châtillon Rugby XIII Hauts-de-Seine
- Nickname: Châtillon XIII
- Founded: 1971; 55 years ago

Current details
- Ground: Stade Guy Moquet
- Chairman: Eric Stern
- Coach: Fabien Briche
- Competition: Fédérale (Ile de France region)

Uniforms
Home colours

Paris Châtillon XIII is a French Rugby League team based in Châtillon in the Hauts-de-Seine department in the Île-de-France region. In 2023, the club plays in the Federal Division, but has participated in the national level championships, 1st division (A and B), Elite 1 and Elite 2 in the past. A title won in Elite as far as Seniors are concerned. Training club of several internationals and Elite players.

== History ==
Paris Chatillon XIII was founded in 1971 by Ernest Roig, a Catalan exiled in the Paris region. From the 80s, the club played mostly in the 1st Division (group A and B) today called Elite 1 and Elite 2, which is a national championship. During the 1984-1985 season, the club won the D1B (Elite2) final and beat Pia XIII with a score of 18-12.

At that time, more precisely during the 1983-19845 season, the club had in its ranks, a world rugby league star, the Australian player Greg Mackey.

In the 1980s, the club was managed by the Australian Tas Baitieri, former player at Canterbury-Bankstown Bulldogs and Balmain Tigers.

In 1993, the club was planning to join a championship in England, feeling isolated in the north of the Loire, far from the traditional lands of treizistes.

In 2002, the club failed to win the Elite 2 championship by losing the final against Lyon XIII (22-28)13, and reached the Elite 1 Championship for the 2002/03 season.

Then 2003-2006: Elite 2.

Since 2006: Senior Federal Championship.

In 2023, the club won the Federal Challenge by beating Belvèze-Razès 50-4.

== Club honours ==
- Elite Two Championship (National League 1) (1): 1984-85

== Notable players ==
- Ronel Zenon
- Tas Baitieri
- John Maguire
- Maxime Herold
- Yannick Mantese
- Jean-Philippe Pougeau
- Ben Cross
- Andrew Farrar
- Greg Mackey

== See also ==
National Division 2
