= Motu Tony =

NZ international rugby league footballer

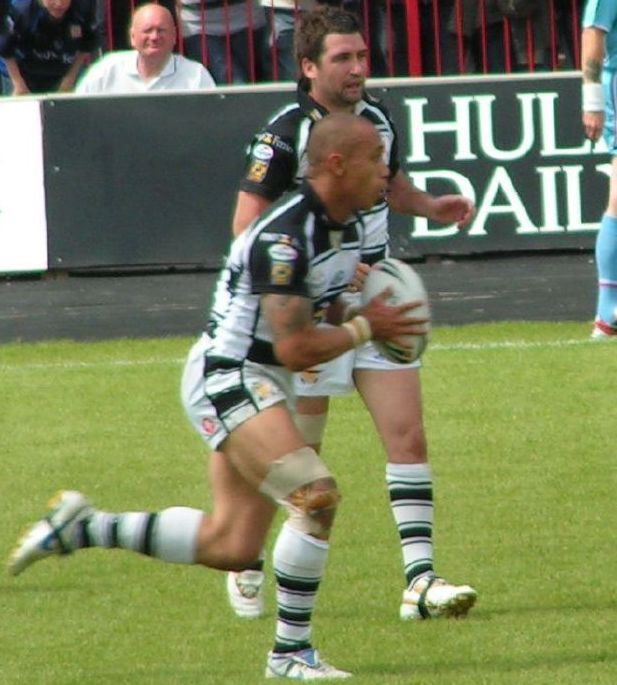

Personal information
- Full name: Motu Iosefo Tony
- Born: 29 May 1981 (age 45) Saleimoa, Gaga'emauga, Samoa

Playing information
- Height: 176 cm (5 ft 9 in)
- Weight: 91.5 kg (14 st 6 lb)
- Position: Fullback, Wing, Five-eighth
Club
Years	Team	Pld	T	G	FG	P
2001–03	New Zealand Warriors	55	23	0	0	92
2004	Brisbane Broncos	3	2	0	0	8
2004	Castleford Tigers	9	1	0	0	4
2005–09	Hull F.C.	105	29	0	0	116
2010	Whitehaven	5	0	0	0	0
2011–12	Wakefield Trinity Wildcats	10	1	0	0	4
	Total	187	56	0	0	224
Representative
Years	Team	Pld	T	G	FG	P
2001–06	New Zealand	14	3	1	0	14

Motu Iosefo Tony (born 29 May 1981) is a former New Zealand international rugby league footballer who played as a fullback in the 2000s and 2010s. He previously played in the NRL for the New Zealand Warriors and the Brisbane Broncos before playing in the Super League for the Castleford Tigers (Heritage No. 815), Hull F.C. (Heritage No. 1025) (with whom he won the 2005 Challenge Cup) and the Wakefield Trinity Wildcats (Heritage No. 1299), and in the RFL Championship for Whitehaven.

== Background ==
Tony was born in Saleimoa, Samoa.

He attended De La Salle College and played for the First XIII rugby league team. He played for the Marist Saints in the Auckland Rugby League competition before being signed by the New Zealand Warriors. He played for the Marist-Richmond Brothers in the 2000 Bartercard Cup and also toured Australia with the New Zealand Residents that year.

== Professional playing career ==
=== National Rugby League ===
Tony made his professional début for the New Zealand Warriors in 2001. He went on to play 55 games for the club, including his appearance at five-eighth in the Warriors' 2002 NRL grand final loss to the Sydney Roosters. In 2004 he moved to the Brisbane Broncos but only played in three games for the club before leaving to play in the Super League. 17 year old Karmichael Hunt took over his spot in Brisbane.

=== Super League ===
Tony initially played for English club Castleford. In 2005 he joined Hull F.C. Tony played fullback for Hull in the 2005 Challenge Cup Final, scoring a try in the victory against Leeds Rhinos. He was part of the New Zealand side that won the Gillette Tri-Nations in 2005, beating Australia in the final 24–0. Hull reached the 2006 Super League Grand final to be contested against St Helens R.F.C. and Tony played on the wing in his side's 4–26 loss. He played in 109 games for Hull before crossing codes to play for National 2 (North) Rugby Union club Hull RUFC. Following the end of the Rugby union season Tony signed for Whitehaven. Tony had represented the New Zealand national rugby league team 18 times between 2001 and 2006.

In 2008 he chose to represent Samoa and was named in the Samoa training squad for the 2008 Rugby League World Cup but withdrew due to injury. In July 2010 it was announced that Tony had signed for a 1-month trial with Championship union side Nottingham Rugby.

On 28 October 2010, Super League club Wakefield Trinity announced the signing of Tony. On 12 June 2010, Tony made his début for Trinity at fullback in their 13–10 home victory over Huddersfield.
