= Emlyn Hughes (rugby league) =

Wales international rugby league footballer

Personal information
- Full name: Emlyn Hughes
- Born: January 1910 Port Talbot, Wales
- Died: December 1980 (aged 70) Ealing, London, England

Playing information

Rugby union
Club
Years	Team	Pld	T	G	FG	P
≤1936–36	Llanelli RFC

Rugby league
- Position: Prop, Second-row
Club
Years	Team	Pld	T	G	FG	P
1936–38	St Helens
1938–≥39	Huddersfield
	Total	0	0	0	0	0
Representative
Years	Team	Pld	T	G	FG	P
1938–39	Wales	2

Emlyn Hughes (January 1910 – December 1980) was a Welsh professional rugby league footballer who played in the 1930s. He played at representative level for Wales, and at club level for St Helens and Huddersfield, as a prop or second-row.

== Playing career ==
=== Club career ===
Hughes played rugby union for Llanelli RFC before switching to rugby league in 1936, joining English club St Helens. He was transferred to Huddersfield in 1938.

Hughes played at second-row in Huddersfield's 18–10 victory over Hull F.C. in the 1938 Yorkshire Cup Final during the 1938–39 season at Odsal Stadium, Bradford on Saturday 22 October 1938.

=== International honours ===
Hughes won caps for Wales while at Huddersfield in 1938 against England, and in 1939 against France.

== Personal life ==
Emlyn Hughes was the brother of Fred Hughes, who was also a Welsh rugby league international, and the uncle of the former association footballer for Liverpool and England, Emlyn Hughes.
