= Tas Baitieri =

Australian rugby league footballer & coach

Tas Baitieri OAM
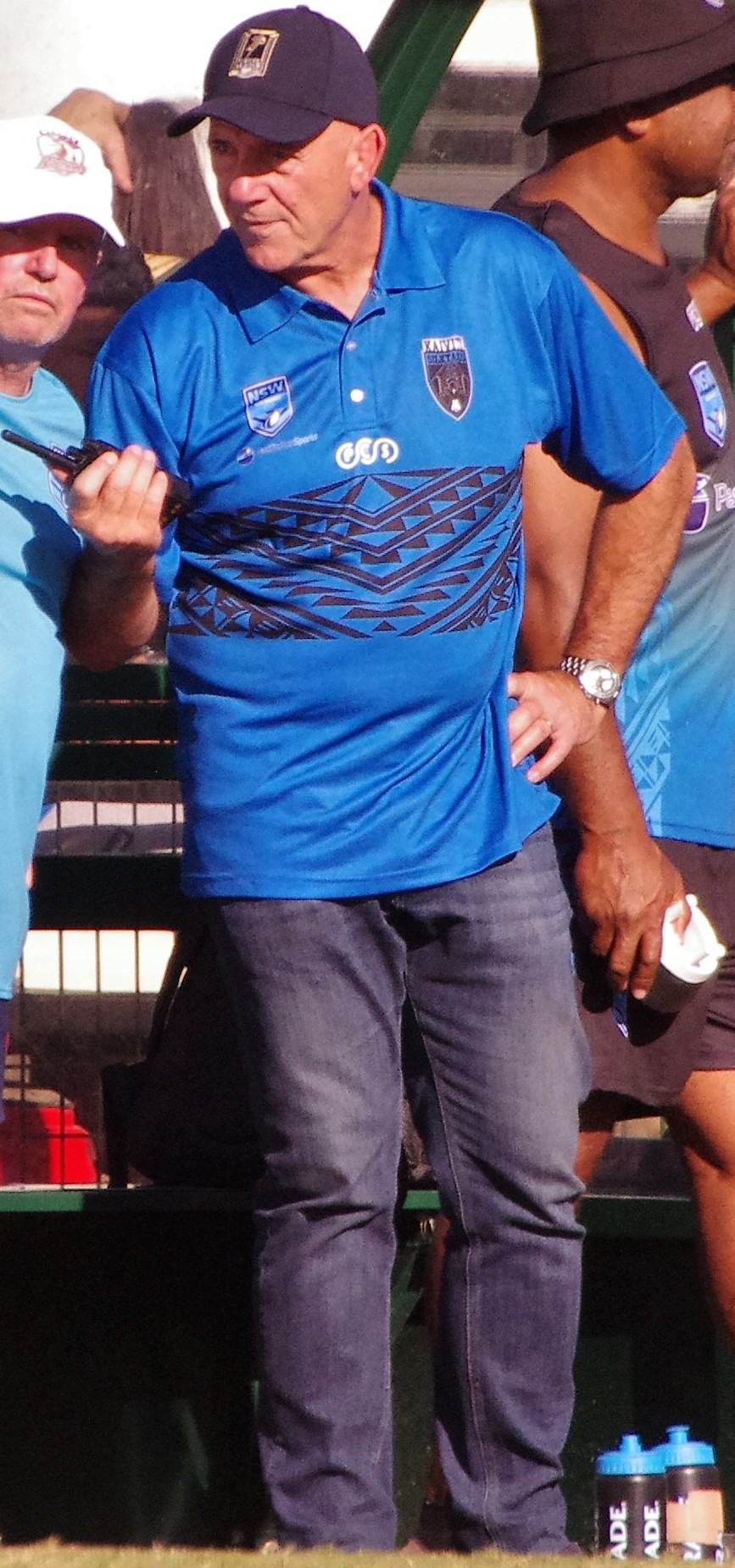

Personal information
- Full name: Bortolo Baitieri
- Born: 14 July 1957 (age 69) Australia

Playing information
- Position: Prop, Second-row
Club
Years	Team	Pld	T	G	FG	P
1977–81	Penrith Panthers	15	0	0	0	0
1982–83	Canterbury-Bankstown	45	1	0	0	3
1985	Penrith Panthers	2	0	0	0	0
	Paris Châtillon XIII
	Total	62	1	0	0	3

Coaching information
Representative
Years	Team	Gms	W	D	L	W%
1985–87	France

Refereeing information
Years	Competition	Apps
1998	International	1

Bortolo "Tas" Baitieri OAM (born 14 July 1957) is an Australian rugby league administrator, former professional player in the 1970s and 1980s, and coach in the 1980s and 1990s. He played for the Penrith Panthers and the Canterbury-Bankstown Bulldogs in Australia, and Paris Châtillon XIII in France. He was later the coach of the French national team.

Baitieri was a significant contributor to the global expansion of rugby league during the 1980s, 1990s, 2000s, and 2010s.

== Playing career ==
Playing in the forwards, Baitieri played with the Penrith Panthers and the Canterbury-Bankstown Bulldogs in Australia, spending the off-seasons in France playing for Paris Châtillon XIII.

== Coaching career ==
Baitieri was appointed as coach of the French national team in 1985. He was dismissed from the role in 1987 amid economic issues for the French Rugby League Federation.

Several years later, Baitieri returned to Australia and coached and player-coached the Cumberland College of Health Sciences (now a faculty of the University of Sydney) Rugby League team in the NSW University Rugby League Competition. The Cumberland side won the 1991 2nd division grand final (defeating the University of Newcastle) in their first season under Baitieri and the side was subsequently elevated to the first division where the "Cumbo Cunnies" finished grand finalists in their first season in the top division. At the end of season 1991, The Cumberland Rugby League Club announced that the Best & Fairest player award would be renamed and called the Tas Baitieri shield in recognition of the efforts and leadership by Baitieri toward his young charges and the esteem in which he was held by players.

== Administration and development roles ==
In 1985, Baitieri attended the RLIB meeting in Paris as a translator for French Rugby League Federation chairman Jacques Soppelsa.

In 1993, Baitieri was appointed as Victoria Rugby League's development officer by the Australian Rugby League.

Baitieri was the chief executive of the short-lived French Super League club Paris Saint-Germain.

In 1998, Baitieri refereed a match between Japan and Lebanon, both playing in their first ever international.

He is also a development officer for the Rugby League International Federation.

Baitieri was a development officer for the National Rugby League until he was made redundant in 2020.

In 2022, Baitieri was the team manager of the Italian national team at the 2021 Rugby League World Cup.

== Personal life ==
Baitieri was born in Australia of Italian descent.

Baitieri's son, Jason, is also a professional rugby league footballer.

In the 2023 King's Birthday Honours, Baitieri was awarded the Medal of the Order of Australia in recognition of his service to rugby league through administrative roles.
