= Dimmy Franks =

Welsh rugby footballer

Dimmy Frank/Franks
Personal information
- Full name: Demetrius/Dimetrius Frank/Franks
- Born: first ¼ 1876; Cardiff, Wales
- Died: second ¼ 1954 (aged c. 76…78); East Glamorgan, Wales

Playing information

Rugby union
Club
| Years | Team | Pld | T | G | FG | P |
|---|---|---|---|---|---|---|
| 1897–02 | Cardiff RFC |

Rugby league
- Position: Stand-off, Scrum-half
Club
| Years | Team | Pld | T | G | FG | P |
|---|---|---|---|---|---|---|
| 1897–04 | Hull FC |
- As of 16 October 2010

Demetrius/Dimetrius "Dimmy" Frank/Franks (first ¼ 1876 – second ¼ 1954) was a Welsh rugby union, and professional rugby league footballer who played in the 1890s and 1900s. He played club level rugby union (RU) for Cardiff RFC, and club level rugby league (RL) for Hull FC, as a stand-off or scrum-half.

== Background ==
Dimmy Franks' birth was registered in Cardiff, Wales, he was the landlord of the Fleece Inn public house, Kingston upon Hull c. 1915 and the Myton Arms public house, Kingston upon Hull c. 1923, as of November 1950 he was living in Cardiff, Wales., and his death aged c. 76…78 was registered in East Glamorgan, Wales.

== Background ==
Dimmy Franks' marriage was registered during fourth ¼ 1904 in Hull, England
