= Derek Davies =

English rugby league footballer

Personal information
- Full name: Derek Davies
- Born: 10 Nov 1936; Halifax

Playing information
Club
Years	Team	Pld	T	G	FG	P
1963–64	Hull FC

Derek Davies (birth unknown) is a former professional rugby league footballer who played in the 1960s. He played at club level for Hull FC.
