= Freddie Miller (rugby league) =

English rugby league footballer

Personal information
- Full name: Freddie Miller
- Born: c. 1915
- Died: 20 July 1960 (aged 45)

Playing information
- Position: Fullback
Club
Years	Team	Pld	T	G	FG	P
1932–50	Hull FC
1950–52	Featherstone Rovers	92	2	245	0	496
	Total	92	2	245	0	496
Representative
Years	Team	Pld	T	G	FG	P
1938	Yorkshire	2	0	5	0	10

Freddie Miller (c. 1915 - 20 July 1960) was a professional rugby league footballer who played in the 1930s, 1940s and 1950s. He played at club level for Hull FC and Featherstone Rovers, as a right-footed goal-kicking fullback, and was captain of Hull during the 1946–47 season.

== Playing career ==
=== Challenge Cup Final appearances ===
Freddie Miller played fullback in Featherstone Rovers' 10-18 defeat by Workington Town in the 1952 Challenge Cup Final during the 1951–52 season at Wembley Stadium, London on Saturday 19 April 1952, in front of a crowd of 72,093.

=== County Cup Final appearances ===
Freddie Miller played fullback in Hull FC's 10-18 defeat by Huddersfield in the 1938 Yorkshire Cup Final during the 1938–39 season at Odsal Stadium, Bradford on Saturday 22 October 1938.

=== Playing career ===
Freddie Miller was transferred from Hull F.C. to Featherstone Rovers for £200 during January 1950, he made his début for Featherstone Rovers on Saturday 21 January 1950, he played his last match for Featherstone Rovers during the 1952–53 season.

== Honoured at Featherstone Rovers ==
Freddie Miller is a Featherstone Rovers Hall of Fame inductee.
