= Charlie Nimb =

South African rugby union player

- Full name: Charles Frederick Nimb
- Born: 6 September 1938 Paarl, South Africa
- Died: 15 June 2004 (aged 65)
- Height: 1.73 m (5 ft 8 in)
- Weight: 76.2 kg (168 lb)

Rugby union career
- Position: Fly–half
Provincial / State sides
Years	Team	Apps	(Points)
- Western Province
International career
Years	Team	Apps	(Points)
1961	South Africa	1	(9)

Charles Frederick Nimb (6 September 1938 – 15 June 2004) was a South African international rugby union player.

Nimb was born in Paarl and educated at Voortrekker High School.

A fly–half, Nimb had a quick rise in rugby, earning a Springboks call up the same season he debuted for Western Province. He first appeared for the Springboks while an understudy to Keith Oxlee on their 1960–61 tour of Europe, but struggled with injuries and was unavailable when Oxlee missed the match against England. After finishing the tour with five non international appearances, Nimb gained his only Springboks cap in 1961 when he played against Ireland at Newlands, where he contributed nine points off his boot in a 24–8 win.

Nimb later switched to rugby league and played with English club Hull.

== See also ==
- List of South Africa national rugby union players
