= Hockey Driscoll =

Welsh rugby footballer

Personal information
- Full name: John Henry Driscoll
- Born: 1876 Cardiff, Wales
- Died: 26 November 1921 (aged 46) Cardiff, Wales

Playing information

Rugby union
- Position: Three-quarter, Half-back
Club
Years	Team	Pld	T	G	FG	P
1895–98	Cardiff RFC	82	30

Rugby league
Club
Years	Team	Pld	T	G	FG	P
1898–02	Hull FC

John Henry Driscoll (1876 – 1921), also known by the nickname of "Hockey", was a Welsh rugby union, and professional rugby league footballer who played in the 1890s and 1900s. He played club level rugby union (RU) for Cardiff RFC as a three-quarter or half-back, and club level rugby league (RL) for Hull FC.

== Background ==
Driscoll was born in Cardiff, Wales, his wife Louisa was proprietor of a dining and tearooms in Cardiff c. 1914, his father Patrick Driscoll was born in Skibbereen, County Cork, Ireland.

== Rugby union career ==
Driscoll joined Cardiff RFC during the 1895–96 season, playing as a half-back. He gained a place in the first team during his initial season and scored 9 tries. Driscoll was not as prolific the following season, with just five tries to his name; however during the 1897–98 season he was switched to the wing. This saw Driscoll becoming the club's fourth highest try scorer with a tally of 16, playing in 30 of the 31 first team games. Cardiff Rugby Club historian D. E. Davies described Driscoll that season as, "our excellent uncapped wing". Having been overlooked by the Wales (RU), the next season Driscoll switched codes to professional rugby league with Hull FC, alongside former Cardiff half-back Tom Savage.

== Nickname ==
Hockey Driscoll's nickname of "Hockey" was a corruption of Hawkeye, and pronounced Ockey, as he would prefer to ankle tap tackle, rather than body tackle, which demanded both a quick-eye (Hawkeye), and fast reactions to see and catch the opposition player's foot.
