= Frank Hurley (rugby league) =

Australian rugby league footballer

Personal information
- Born: 7 June 1915 Sydney, New South Wales, Australia
- Died: 22 May 1992 (aged 76) Sydney, New South Wales, Australia

Playing information
- Position: Wing
Club
Years	Team	Pld	T	G	FG	P
1935–36	Newtown	25	15	0	0	45
1937–39	Hull FC	66	29	0	0	87
1939–40	Newtown	0	0	0	0	0
	Total	91	44	0	0	132
Representative
Years	Team	Pld	T	G	FG	P
1936	New South Wales	3	0	0	0	0

Frank Hurley (7 June 1915 − 22 May 1992) was an Australian professional rugby league footballer who played in the 1930s and 1940s. He played at representative level for New South Wales, and at club level for the Newtown Bluebags and Hull FC, as a wing.

== Playing career ==
=== Newtown ===
Frank Hurley attended Sydney Boys High and played Rugby Union for the school and represented GPS.

After leaving school he joined Drummoyne Rugby Union Club and played 1st Grade. He trailed for Newtown in 1935 and was offered a contract.

Hurley played for Newtown and in 1936 was selected to play for New South Wales.

Hurley played left-wing in New South Wales' 30-13 victory over Queensland in the 1936 Interstate rugby league series at Sydney Cricket Ground on Saturday 16 May 1936, in front of a crowd of 36,021. He also played in their 24-13 victory over Queensland on Saturday 23 May, in front of a crowd of 27,539, and then played in the 18-14 victory over Great Britain during the Lions tour on Saturday 6 June 1936, in front of a crowd of 49,519.

=== Hull ===
On Tuesday 23 February 1937, the Mayor of Newtown, Alderman Fred Newnham, a solicitor, presided over a farewell ceremony for Hurley at Newtown Town Hall, and speeches expressing good wishes were made by aldermen of Newtown, and officials of the Newtown Bluebags. On Wednesday 24 February 1937, Hurley left Australia bound for England to play for Hull F.C.

He became the first overseas player to score a hat-trick of tries for Hull F.C. in the Hull Kingston Rovers derby match. Only two other overseas players have since equalled this feat; Tevita Vaikona and Fetuli Talanoa.

Hurley played right-wing in Hull's 10-18 defeat by Huddersfield in the 1938 Yorkshire Cup Final during the 1938–39 season at Odsal Stadium, Bradford on Saturday 22 October 1938, in front of a crowd of 28,714.

=== Return to Australia and later years ===
Hurley had hoped to play for Hull for four years, however the start of World War II on 1 September 1939 curtailed his stay in England and, upon his return to Australia, he rejoined Newtown playing briefly during the 1940 NSWRFL season. He then returned to Britain to serve with No. 10 Squadron RAAF of the Royal Australian Air Force (RAAF) until the end of World War II in 1945. He died after a short illness in 1992, 16 days short of his 77th birthday.
