= Alan Banks (rugby league) =

English rugby league footballer

Personal information
- Full name: Alan Banks
- Born: second ¼ 1965 (age 59–60); Pontefract, England

Playing information
- Position: Wing, Stand-off
Club
Years	Team	Pld	T	G	FG	P
1982–91	Featherstone Rovers	218+15	47	0	0	186
- Relatives: Barry Banks (brother); Nicky Saxton (nephew); Tommy Saxton (nephew)

Alan Banks (birth registered second 1/4 1965) is an English former professional rugby league footballer who played in the 1980s and 1990s. He played at club level for Featherstone Rovers, as a wing or stand-off.

== Background ==
Alan Banks' birth was registered in Pontefract, West Riding of Yorkshire, England.

== Playing career ==
Banks made his début for Featherstone Rovers on Wednesday 28 April 1982, during his time at Featherstone Rovers he scored two 3-point tries, and forty-five 4-point tries.

=== Challenge Cup Final appearances ===
Banks played stand-off in Featherstone Rovers' 14–12 victory over Hull F.C. in the 1983 Challenge Cup Final during the 1982–83 season at Wembley Stadium, London on Saturday 7 May 1983, in front of a crowd of 84,969.

=== County Cup Final appearances ===
Banks played on the wing in Featherstone Rovers' 14–20 defeat by Bradford Northern in the 1989 Yorkshire Cup Final during the 1989–90 season at Headingley, Leeds on Sunday 5 November 1989.

== Genealogical information ==
Banks is the uncle of the rugby league footballer; Tommy Saxton.
