= Tommy Saxton =

English rugby league footballer (born 1983)

Personal information
- Full name: Thomas Saxton
- Born: 3 October 1983 (age 42) Pontefract, West Yorkshire, England
- Height: 6 ft 1 in (1.85 m)
- Weight: 14 st 2 lb (90 kg)

Playing information
- Position: Fullback, Wing, Centre
Club
Years	Team	Pld	T	G	FG	P
2000–04	Castleford Tigers	39	11	0	0	44
2005–06	Hull FC	29	4	0	0	16
2006(loan)	→ Wakefield Trinity Wildcats	15	2	0	0	8
2007	Castleford Tigers	18	11	0	1	45
2007(loan)	→ Salford City Reds	5	0	0	0	0
2008–14	Featherstone Rovers	162	70	0	0	280
2014(loan)	→ Halifax	12	5	0	0	20
2014–16	Halifax	37	16	0	0	64
2016(loan)	→ York City Knights	13	3	0	0	12
2017	York City Knights	14	2	0	0	8
2018	York City Knights	2	0	0	0	0
	Total	346	124	0	1	497
- Source: As of 6 May 2018
- Relatives: Nicky Saxton (brother); Alan Banks (uncle); Barry Banks (uncle)

Thomas Saxton (born 3 October 1983) is an English former professional rugby league footballer who last played for the York City Knights in Kingstone Press League 1, usually as a fullback, but also as a wing or centre.

He has previously played for the Castleford Tigers, Hull FC, Wakefield Trinity Wildcats and the Salford City Reds in the Super League. Also he has represented England A-Team and England Academy.

Saxton played for Hull in the 2005 Challenge Cup Final from the interchange bench in their victory against the Leeds Rhinos.

He played for six seasons with Featherstone Rovers before moving to Halifax in 2015. In November 2016 he signed for York having joined the club on-loan earlier in the year.

== Genealogical information ==
Tommy Saxton is the brother of the rugby league footballer; Nicky Saxton, and the nephew of the rugby league footballer; Alan Banks.
