= Samuel Banks =

English rugby league footballer

Personal information
- Full name: Samuel Banks
- Born: Featherstone, Yorkshire, England

Playing information
- Position: Forward
Club
Years	Team	Pld	T	G	FG	P
1901–02	Wakefield Trinity	18	0	0	0	0
1906–08	Hull FC
	Total	18	0	0	0	0

Samuel Banks was a professional rugby league footballer who played in the 1900s. He played at club level for Wakefield Trinity and Hull FC, as a forward.
