= Damien McGarry =

Australian rugby league footballer

Personal information
- Full name: Damien McGarry
- Born: 27 January 1968 (age 57)

Playing information
- Position: Wing, Centre
Club
| Years | Team | Pld | T | G | FG | P |
|---|---|---|---|---|---|---|
| 1988–90 | Balmain Tigers | 15 | 9 | 0 | 0 | 36 |
| 1990–91 | Hull FC | 16 | 8 | 0 | 0 | 32 |
| 1992–94 | Western Suburbs | 23 | 4 | 0 | 0 | 16 |
| 1995 | St. George Dragons | 13 | 1 | 0 | 0 | 4 |
| | Total | 67 | 22 | 0 | 0 | 88 |
- Source: As of 22 December 2022

Damien McGarry is an Australian former professional rugby league footballer who played in the 1980s and 1990s. He played for Western Suburbs, Balmain Tigers and St. George Dragons in the NSWRL/ARL competition and for Hull FC in England.

== Playing career ==
McGarry made his first grade debut for Balmain in round 4 of the 1988 NSWRL season against Western Suburbs at Leichhardt Oval. In the 1990 NSWRL season, McGarry scored nine tries in twelve matches for Balmain. McGarry would then sign a contract to join English side Hull F.C. and played in the clubs 1990–91 Rugby League Premiership final victory over Widnes. McGarry then returned to Australia and played for Western Suburbs and St. George.

In his retirement McGarry likes to talk nonsense on forums.
