= Barry Banks (rugby league) =

England international rugby league footballer

Personal information
- Full name: Barry Banks

Playing information
- Position: Fullback, Centre, Stand-off
Club
Years	Team	Pld	T	G	FG	P
≤1979–80	York
1980–84	Hull FC	55	24	0	0	77
1984–85	Hunslet		5			20
	Total	55	29	0	0	97
Representative
Years	Team	Pld	T	G	FG	P
1977–79	Yorkshire	2	1	0	0	3
1979	Great Britain U24	1	0	0	0	0
1979	England	1	0	0	0	0
- Relatives: Alan Banks (brother); Nicky Saxton (nephew); Tommy Saxton (nephew)

Barry Banks is an English former professional rugby league footballer who played as a fullback, centre or stand-off in the 1970s and 1980s. He played at representative level for England, and at club level for York, Hull FC and Hunslet.

== Playing career ==
=== York ===
Banks played stand-off, and scored two goals in York's 8–18 defeat by Bradford Northern in the 1978–79 Yorkshire Cup Final during the 1978–79 season at Headingley, Leeds on Saturday 28 October 1978.

=== Hull FC ===
Banks was transferred from York to Hull FC in October 1980 for a fee of £20,000.

Banks played fullback in Hull's 12–4 victory over Hull Kingston Rovers in the 1981–82 John Player Trophy Final during the 1981–82 season at Headingley, Leeds on Saturday 23 January 1982.

For the 1984–85 season, Banks was loaned out to Hunslet, but broke his leg in a match against Widnes in December 1984.

=== International honours ===
Banks won a cap for England while at York in 1979 against France (sub).
