= Dean Busby =

English rugby league footballer

Personal information
- Full name: Dean Trevor Busby
- Born: 1 February 1973 (age 52) Kingston upon Hull, East Riding of Yorkshire, England

Playing information
- Position: Prop, Second-row, Loose forward
Club
Years	Team	Pld	T	G	FG	P
1990–95	Hull FC	87	20	0	0	80
1995–98	St Helens	28	3	0	0	12
1998	Hull FC	14	0	0	0	0
1999–02	Warrington Wolves	78	7	0	0	28
2003	Hull KR	10	1	0	0	4
	Total	217	31	0	0	124
Representative
Years	Team	Pld	T	G	FG	P
1991–92	Great Britain U-21	3	0	0	0	0
1992	England	1	0	0	0	0
2000–01	Wales	4	0	0	0	0

Dean Trevor Busby (born 1 February 1973) is an English former professional rugby league footballer who played in the 1990s and 2000s. He played at representative level for England and Wales and at club level for Hull FC (two spells), St Helens, and the Warrington Wolves, as a prop, second-row, or loose forward.

== Background ==
Dean Busby was born in Hull, East Riding of Yorkshire, England.

== Playing career ==
=== Hull FC ===
Busby played loose forward in Hull FC's 14–4 victory over Widnes in the 1990–91 Premiership Final during the 1990–91 season at Old Trafford, Manchester on Sunday 12 May 1991.

=== St Helens ===
Busby played loose forward in St. Helens' 16–25 defeat by Wigan in the 1995–96 Regal Trophy Final during the 1995–96 at Alfred McAlpine Stadium, Huddersfield on Saturday 13 January 1996.

Dean Busby played during St. Helens' victory in 1996's Super League I.

=== Warrington ===
Busby made his début for the Warrington Wolves on Sunday, 14 February 1999, and he played his last match for the Warrington Wolves on Sunday, 8 September 2002.

=== International honours ===
Busby won three caps for Great Britain under-21s, one cap for England against Wales in 1992. He won caps for Wales while at Warrington in 2000 against South Africa, in the 2000 Rugby League World Cup against Cook Islands, Lebanon, and Papua New Guinea, and 2001 against England.

Busby played for Wales in the 1995 Rugby League World Cup, and the 2000 Rugby League World Cup.
