= John Feetham =

John Feetham may refer to:

- Jack Feetham, English rugby league footballer
- John Feetham (bishop), Anglican bishop in Australia
