= Gary Nolan (rugby league) =

English rugby league footballer

Personal information
- Full name: Gary Nolan
- Born: 31 May 1966 (age 58)

Playing information
- Position: Centre, Fullback, Wing
Club
Years	Team	Pld	T	G	FG	P
1990–95	Hull FC	88	29	0	0	116

Gary Nolan (born 31 May 1966) is an English former rugby league footballer for Hull FC.

Nolan was a substitute, and scored a try in Hull FC's 14–4 victory over Widnes in the Premiership Final during the 1990-91 season at Old Trafford, Manchester on 12 May 1991. He had previously scored the winning try in the semi-final against Leeds, leapt into the air to collect a bomb from Greg Mackey and taking the ball out of the hands of Leeds "star" All-Black full-back John Gallagher.

Nolan had been an amateur with Hull Dockers just six weeks previously. He made his mark in the Old Trafford game after entering as a 48th-minute substitute. He claimed the clinching try in the 14–4 win with just 10 minutes remaining when he stretched out an arm through a tangle of bodies. It was only his fourth first-team appearance and he enjoyed only a short career. As of 2007, he is the manager of a food processing plant in Hull.
