= Ernie Herbert (rugby league) =

England international rugby league footballer

Personal information
- Full name: Ernest Herbert
- Born: c. 1914
- Died: 18 September 1942 (aged 28) Leeds, England

Playing information
- Position: Stand-off
Club
Years	Team	Pld	T	G	FG	P
1933–42	Hull F.C.
Representative
Years	Team	Pld	T	G	FG	P
1936–38	England	2	0	0	0	0

Ernest Herbert (c. 1914 – 18 September 1942) was an English professional rugby league footballer who played in the 1930s and 1940s. He played at representative level for England, and at club level for Hull FC, as a stand-off.

== Background ==
He died aged 28 at his home in Leeds, West Riding of Yorkshire, England.

== Playing career ==
=== Club career ===
Herbert began his career at Hull in 1933, and played stand-off in Hull FC's 10-18 defeat by Huddersfield in the 1938 Yorkshire Cup Final during the 1938–39 season at Odsal Stadium, Bradford on Saturday 22 October 1938.

=== International honours ===
Herbert won caps for England while at Hull in 1936 against France, and in 1938 against France.

== Background ==
Ernie Herbert was the older brother of the rugby league footballer who played in the 1940s for Hull FC; Harry Herbert
