= Patrick Entat =

France international rugby league footballer (b.1964)

Personal information
- Born: 19 September 1964 (age 61) France

Playing information
- Position: Scrum-half
Club
Years	Team	Pld	T	G	FG	P
1986–90	SO Avignon
1990–91	Hull FC	28	4	0	0	16
1991–94	SO Avignon
1994–95	Leeds Rhinos	20	2	0	0	8
1996	Paris Saint-Germain	22	2	0	0	8
	Total	70	8	0	0	32
Representative
Years	Team	Pld	T	G	FG	P
1986–95	France	35	3	0	0	12

Coaching information
Club
Years	Team	Gms	W	D	L	W%
2001–02	Carpentras XIII
- Source: As of 16 January 2021

Patrick Entat (born 19 September 1964) is a French rugby league footballer who represented France at the 1995 World Cup.

== Playing career ==
From the Sporting Olympique Avignon club in France, Entat made his début for the France in 1986. He went on to play in 34 test matches and captain the side.

He spent several seasons in the English competition. He played for Hull FC in 1990–91, where he was part of the team that won the 1990–91 Premiership final, and for Leeds in 1994–95. In 1996 he was part of the inaugural Paris Saint-Germain squad that competed in the Super League.

His last game for France was at the 1995 World Cup.

== Later years ==
Entat later served as manager for Sporting Olympique Avignon, and in 2001/02 coached Carpentras XIII.
