= Ian Stevens (rugby, born 1967) =

Wales international rugby league footballer (born 1967)

- Full name: Ian Stevens
- Born: 18 February 1967 (age 59) Wales

Rugby union career
- Position: Fly-half
Senior career
| Years | Team | Apps | (Points) |
- South Wales Police RFC
- Swansea RFC
- Belmont Shore RFC
International career
| Years | Team | Apps | (Points) |
| 1998 | United States | 1 | (4) |
- Rugby league career

Playing information
- Position: Stand-off, Centre, Wing
Club
| Years | Team | Pld | T | G | FG | P |
|---|---|---|---|---|---|---|
| 1992–94 | Hull FC | 16 | 1 | 6 | 0 | 16 |
Representative
| Years | Team | Pld | T | G | FG | P |
| 1992 | Wales | 1 | 0 | 0 | 0 | 0 |

Ian Stevens is a former rugby union and rugby league footballer who played in the 1990s. He played at international level for Wales, and at club level for Hull FC.

== Rugby union ==
Stevens played rugby union at club level for South Wales Police RFC and Swansea RFC. He also represented Wales at schools and youth level.

In 1995, Stevens emigrated to California, and returned to rugby union with Belmont Shore RFC. In 1998, he represented the United States in a 1999 Rugby World Cup qualifier against Canada.

== Rugby league ==
Stevens joined English rugby league club Hull in December 1991, following a successful trial.

Stevens won one cap for Wales as a substitute in 1992 while at Hull.
