= William Feetham =

English rugby league footballer

Billy Feetham
Personal information
- Full name: William Feetham
- Born: unknown
- Died: unknown

Playing information
Club
Years	Team	Pld	T	G	FG	P
1895–97	Hull FC
1897–≥97	Hull Kingston Rovers	41	6	0	0	18
	Total	41	6	0	0	18

William "Billy" Feetham (birth unknown – death unknown) was a professional rugby league footballer who played in the 1890s. He played at club level for Hull FC, and Hull Kingston Rovers.

On 6 November 1897, he played as a substitute for Hull Kingston Rovers against St Helens, without Hull FC's permission, causing complaints that his appearance for Hull Kingston Rovers violated Northern Union rules.
