= H. Thompson (rugby league) =

Australian rugby league footballer

H Thompson (born Sydney, Australia) was a rugby league footballer in the New South Wales Rugby League (NSWRL)'s foundation season – 1908. Thompson played for the Eastern Suburbs club.
