= Greg Mackey =

Australian rugby league footballer

Personal information
- Born: 20 October 1961; Sydney, New South Wales, Australia
- Died: 24 September 2014 (aged 52); Sydney, Australia

Playing information
- Position: Five-eighth, Halfback
Club
| Years | Team | Pld | T | G | FG | P |
|---|---|---|---|---|---|---|
| 1980–83 | South Sydney | 28 | 6 | 0 | 0 | 18 |
| 1983–84 | Paris Châtillon XIII |
| 1984–88 | Illawarra Steelers | 105 | 29 | 3 | 0 | 122 |
| 1989 | Canterbury Bulldogs | 14 | 4 | 0 | 0 | 16 |
| 1989–90 | Warrington | 9 | 2 | 0 | 3 | 11 |
| 1989–92 | Hull FC | 95 | 18 | 0 | 6 | 78 |
| 1992–96 | Warrington | 114 | 17 | 4 | 17 | 93 |
| 1996 | Huddersfield Giants | 20 | 3 | 0 | 3 | 15 |
| | Total | 385 | 79 | 7 | 29 | 353 |

Greg "Bluey" Mackey (20 October 1961 – 24 September 2014) was an Australian professional rugby league footballer who played in the 1980s and 1990s. Mackey played at club level for South Sydney Rabbitohs for three seasons between 1980 and 1983, Illawarra Steelers for five seasons between 1984 and 1988, Paris Châtillon XIII, Canterbury-Bankstown Bulldogs for one season in 1989, Warrington (twice), Huddersfield and Hull FC, usually as a five-eighth or halfback, and was Captain of Hull during the 1990–91 and 1991–92 seasons.

== Playing career ==
Mackey played scrum-half in Warrington's 24–16 victory over Oldham in the 1989 Lancashire Cup Final during the 1989–90 season at Knowsley Road, St. Helens on Saturday 14 October 1989.

Mackey played scrum-half, was captain, and was man of the match, winning the Harry Sunderland Trophy in Hull FC's 14–4 victory over Widnes in the Premiership Final during the 1990–91 season at Old Trafford, Manchester on Sunday 12 May 1991.

Between 1992 and 1995, Mackey made a club record 98 consecutive appearances for Warrington.

Mackey played in Warrington's 0–24 defeat by Australia on the 1994 Kangaroo tour of Great Britain and France at Wilderspool Stadium, Warrington on Wednesday 9 November 1994.

Mackey played scrum-half in Warrington's 10–40 defeat by Wigan in the 1994–95 Regal Trophy Final during the 1994–95 season at Alfred McAlpine Stadium, Huddersfield on Saturday 28 January 1995.

== Illness and death ==
Mackey was diagnosed with bowel cancer in December 2011. He died after suffering a heart attack on 24 September 2014, aged 52.
