= 2025 Hull FC season =

English rugby league team season

Hull F.C. 2025 season
- 2025 Super League season Rank: 7th
- Play-off result: Did not qualify
- Challenge Cup: Quarter-finals
- 2025 record: Wins: 15; draws: 1; losses: 14
- Points scored: For: 539; against: 461

Team information
- Chairmen: Andrew Thirkhill; David Hood
- Head Coach: John Cartwright
- Captain: Aidan Sezer
- Stadium: MKM Stadium
- Avg. attendance: 12,159
- High attendance: 21,018; Hull Kingston Rovers, 18 April
- Low attendance: 9,765; Leigh Leopards, 6 March

Top scorers
- Tries: Lewis Martin (25)
- Goals: Aiden Sezer (32)
- Points: Lewis Martin (100)
Home colours	Away colours
← 2024	List of seasons	2026 →

The 2025 season was Hull F.C.'s 28th consecutive season playing in England's top division of rugby league. They competed in the 2025 Super League season and the 2025 Challenge Cup.

The 2025 season saw major changes in the club's management. Following the sacking of head coach Tony Smith and assistant coach Stanley Gene during the 2024 season, Hull FC announced that former Brisbane Broncos assistant coach John Cartwright would be the club's head coach from the 2025 season. Andy Last was also announced to be returning from the England national rugby league team to be Hull FC's assistant coach, having previously left the club in November 2020. On 13 November 2024, chairman Adam Pearson announced that he had sold Hull F.C. to businessmen Andrew Thirkill and David Hood and was stepping down as chairman after 13 years in charge of the club.

== Preseason friendlies ==
Date and time	Versus	H/A	Venue	Result	Score	Tries	Goals	Attendance	Report
1 February; 15:00 (Note: Joe Westerman's testimonial match)	Castleford Tigers	A	Wheldon Road	W	16–10	Rapana, Cartwright, Bourouh	Hardaker (0/1), Westerman (2/2)		

== Super League ==
Date and time	Round	Versus	H/A	Venue	Result	Score	Tries	Goals	Attendance	TV	Pos.	Report
14 February; 20:00 (GMT)	Round 1	Catalans Dragons	A	Stade Gilbert Brutus	W	24–4	Cust (2), Lane, Briscoe	Sezer (4/4)	9,273	Sky Sports +	2nd	
21 February; 20:00	Round 2	Wigan Warriors	H	MKM Stadium	L	4–46	Martin	Sezer (0/1)	14,751	Sky Sports +	8th	
28 February; 20:00	Round 3	Huddersfield Giants	A	Kirklees Stadium	W	11–10	Martin, Barron	Sezer (1/2); Drop-goals: Sezer	4,559	Sky Sports +	7th	
6 March; 20:00	Round 4	Leigh Leopards	H	MKM Stadium	D	22–22 (g.p.)	Cartwright, Barron, Ese'ese, Martin	Sezer (2/4), Lane (1 pen.)	9,765	Sky Sports Action	5th	
21 March; 20:00	Round 5	Wakefield Trinity	A	Belle Vue	W	16–12	Ese'ese, Chamberlain, Martin	Sezer (2/3)	8,027	Sky Sports +	3rd	
27 March; 20:00	Round 6	Castleford Tigers	A	Wheldon Road	W	24–14	Ese'ese, Sezer, Briscoe, Martin	Sezer (3/4 + 1 pen.)	7,458	Sky Sports Action	2nd	
12 April; 17:30	Round 7	Warrington Wolves	A	Halliwell Jones Stadium	W	28–16	Briscoe (2), Litten (2), Ese'ese	Pryce (3/5 + 1 pen.)	11,023	Sky Sports +	2nd	
18 April, 12:30 (Good Friday)	Round 8 (Rivals Round)	Hull Kingston Rovers	H	MKM Stadium	L	14–28	Ashworth, Briscoe, Rapana	Pryce (1/3)	21,018	Sky Sports Action	3rd	
27 April, 15:00	Round 9	Wigan Warriors	H	MKM Stadium	L	12–36	Pryce, Barron	Sezer (2/2)	11,205	Sky Sports +	4th	
4 May; 13:00	Round 10 (Magic Weekend)	Huddersfield Giants	N	St James' Park	L	10–12	Ese'ese, Martin	Sezer (1/2)	32,862 (Note: Attendance recorded across three fixtures.)	Sky Sports Action	5th	
16 May; 20:00	Round 11	Leeds Rhinos	A	Headingley Rugby Stadium	L	16–18	Martin, Eseh, Barron	Sezer (2/3)	15,602	Sky Sports +	7th	
22 May; 20:00	Round 12	Leigh Leopards	A	Leigh Sports Village	W	26–12	Cust, Ese'ese, Martin, Eseh	Sezer (3/4 + 2 pen.)	8,046	Sky Sports +	7th	
31 May; 17:30 (GMT)	Round 13	Catalans Dragons	A	Stade Gilbert Brutus	W	34–0	Pryce (2), Ese'ese, Martin, Litten, Briscoe	Sezer (5/6)		Sky Sports +	5th	
13 June; 20:00	Round 14	Castleford Tigers	H	MKM Stadium	L	14–22	Martin (2), Barron	Sezer (1/2), Hardaker (0/1)	13,376	Sky Sports +	6th	
22 June; 15:00	Round 15	Salford Red Devils	A	Salford Community Stadium	W	38–6	Cust, Martin, Litten, Eseh, Hardaker, Briscoe, Barron	Hardaker (3/5), Charles (2/2)		Sky Sports +	6th	
27 June; 20:00	Round 16	Warrington Wolves	A	Halliwell Jones Stadium	L	10–24	Barron, Sezer	Sezer (1/2)	10,235	Sky Sports +	6th	
5 July; 15:00	Round 17	St Helens	H	MKM Stadium	L	6–13	Litten	Hardaker (1/1)		Sky Sports +	7th	
10 July; 20:00	Round 18	Wakefield Trinity	H	MKM Stadium	W	16–10	Hardaker, Rapana, Martin	Charles (2/3)	10,401	Sky Sports Action	6th	
19 July; 15:00	Round 19	Wigan Warriors	A	Brick Community Stadium	W	32–12	Cartwright (2), Sezer, Rapana, Ashworth	Charles (5/5 + 1 pen.)	14,427	BBC Two; Sky Sports +	6th	
26 July; 15:00	Round 20	Huddersfield Giants	H	MKM Stadium	L	14–30	Martin (3)	Charles (1/3)	10,665	Sky Sports +	7th	
10 August; 15:00	Round 21	Salford Red Devils	H	MKM Stadium	W	80–6	Martin (4), Barron (2), Cartwright (2), Litten (2), Cust, Ese'ese, Bourouh, Briscoe	Hardaker (11/13 + 1 pen.)	11,242	Sky Sports +	6th	
16 August; 17:30	Round 22	Leigh Leopards	H	MKM Stadium	W	18–12	Cust, Barron, Martin	Hardaker (3/3)	10,863	Sky Sports +	6th	
22 August; 20:00	Round 23	St Helens	A	Totally Wicked Stadium	L	10–16	Litten, Martin	Hardaker (1/2)		Sky Sports Action	6th	
30 August; 15:00	Round 24	Leeds Rhinos	H	MKM Stadium	L	0–34				Sky Sports +	7th	
7 September; 15:05 (Note: Kick-off delayed by five minutes to accommodate nationwide test of UK Emergency Alert System.)	Round 25	Hull Kingston Rovers	A	Craven Park	L	4–18	Briscoe	Hardaker (0/1)	12,338	Sky Sports Action	7th	
13 September; 17:30	Round 26	Warrington Wolves	H	MKM Stadium	W	34–2	Martin, Balmforth, Sezer, Barron, Lane, Hardaker	Hardaker (5/6)	10,494	Sky Sports +	7th	
18 September; 20:00	Round 27	Catalans Dragons	H	MKM Stadium	L	22–26	Barron (2), Martin (2)	Hardaker (3/4)	10,918	Sky Sports +	7th	

=== Table ===
Pos	Team	Pld	W	D	L	PF	PA	PD	Pts	Qualification
1	Hull Kingston Rovers (L, C)	27	22	0	5	786	292	+494	44	Advance to Semi-finals
2	Wigan Warriors	27	21	0	6	794	333	+461	42	Advance to Semi-finals
3	Leigh Leopards	27	19	1	7	619	452	+167	39	Advance to Eliminators
4	Leeds Rhinos	27	18	0	9	610	310	+300	36	Advance to Eliminators
5	St Helens	27	17	0	10	677	314	+363	34	Advance to Eliminators
6	Wakefield Trinity (Note: Salford forfeited their game against Wakefield. Under RFL operational rules, the game is recorded as a 48–0 victory for Wakefield, and converse loss for Salford, with the points scored and conceded applying to both teams.)	27	15	0	12	688	458	+230	30	Advance to Eliminators
7	Hull FC	27	13	1	13	539	461	+78	27	
8	Warrington Wolves	27	10	0	17	480	641	−161	20	
9	Catalans Dragons	27	10	0	17	425	652	−227	20	
10	Huddersfield Giants	27	7	0	20	347	738	−391	14	
11	Castleford Tigers	27	6	0	21	396	815	−419	12	
12	Salford Red Devils (R)	27	3	0	24	234	1129	−895	4 (Note: On 22 September 2025, Salford Red Devils were deducted two points breaching "a number of RFL operational rules" surrounding their team selection for their Round 1 fixture against St Helens on 15 February 2025.)	Relegated to Championship

(C) Champions; (L) League Leaders' Shield Winners; (R) Relegated

== Challenge Cup ==
On 25 June 2024, the RFL announced a change to the Challenge Cup format, totalling 7 rounds compared to the previous 9, with Super League teams entering to play away from home at round 3.

Hull F.C. were drawn on 14 January to play York Acorn A.R.L.F.C., who play in the National Conference League Premier Division, following fixtures in Rounds 1 and 2 that eliminated GB Police, the London Chargers and the Oulton Raiders from contention. The fixture was originally set to be played away at the Acorn Sport and Social Club on Thanet Road, York, however the venue was changed to Featherstone Rovers' Post Office Road ground due to the expense involved in York Acorn preparing their ground for Hull F.C. Following their victory against York, Hull F.C. were drawn on 15 February to play Wigan Warriors away at the Brick Community Stadium on 15 March.

Following their 26–22 comeback victory against Wigan, Hull F.C. entered into the quarter-finals and, for the first time since they were knocked out in first round of the 1985–86 Challenge Cup, were drawn in a Hull Derby to play Hull Kingston Rovers at home on 5 April. Hull F.C. were ultimately knocked out of the 2025 Challenge Cup during this fixture.

Date and time	Round	Versus	H/A	Venue	Result	Score	Tries	Goals	Attendance	TV	Report
8 February; 14:00	Round 3	York Acorn	N	Post Office Road	W	52–6	Martin (3), Barron (2), Cust, Asiata, Balmforth, Kemp	Westerman (8/9)		Not televised	
15 March; 17:45	Round 4	Wigan Warriors	A	Brick Community Stadium	W	26–22	Martin (3), Ese'ese, Bourouh	Sezer (3/5)	9,287	BBC iPlayer	
5 April; 14:30	Quarter-finals	Hull Kingston Rovers	H	MKM Stadium	L	16–32	Martin, Ese'ese, Hardaker	Pryce (2/2)	20,226	BBC One	

== Transfers ==
=== Gains ===
Player	Club	Contract	Date
(Tonga) John Asiata	Leigh Leopards	3 Years	May 2024
(Turkey) Yusuf Aydin	Hull Kingston Rovers	2 Years	May 2024
(England) Jordan Abdull	Hull Kingston Rovers	3 Years	June 2024
(England) Amir Bourouh	Salford Red Devils	3 Years	June 2024
(England) Zak Hardaker	Leigh Leopards	2 Years	July 2024
(Ireland) Ed Chamberlain	Leigh Leopards	3 Years	July 2024
(England) Oliver Holmes	Leigh Leopards	2 Years	July 2024
(New Zealand) Jordan Rapana	Canberra Raiders	2 Years	September 2024
(Australia) Aidan Sezer	Wests Tigers	2 Years	September 2024
(Australia) Cade Cust	Salford Red Devils	2 Years	October 2024
(France) Hugo Salabio	Huddersfield Giants	2 Years	December 2024
(Australia) Liam Knight	South Sydney Rabbitohs	1 Year	March 2025
(England) Liam Watts	Castleford Tigers	1 Year	March 2025
(England) Will Pryce	Newcastle Knights	3 1/2 Years	March 2025

==== Loans in ====
Player	Club	Loan period	Date
(England) Sam Eseh	Wigan Warriors	End of season	February 2025

=== Losses ===
Player	Club	Contract	Date
(England) Jack Brown	Hull Kingston Rovers	2 Years	May 2024
(England) Cameron Scott	Wakefield Trinity	2 Years + 1 Year	June 2024
(England) Jake Trueman	Wakefield Trinity	3 Years	August 2024
(England) Danny Houghton	N/A	Retirement	August 2024
(Fiji) Mitieli Vulikijapani	TBC		September 2024
(Fiji) King Vuniyayawa	Salford Red Devils	End of loan	September 2024
(England) Leon Ruan	Leeds Rhinos	End of loan	September 2024
(England) Charlie Severs	N/A		September 2024
(England) Liam Sutcliffe	Huddersfield Giants	3 Years	September 2024
(England) Lennon Bursell	Goole Vikings		October 2024
(England) Mackenzie Harman	Goole Vikings		October 2024
(Australia) Jeylan Hodgson	Goole Vikings		October 2024
(England) Sully Medforth	Midlands Hurricanes	1 Year	November 2024
(England) Kye Armstrong	TBC		November 2024
(Samoa) Carlos Tuimavave	Featherstone Rovers	2 Years	November 2024
(England) Jordan Abdull	TBC	Released	January 2025
(England) Jack Walker	Sheffield Eagles	Rolling monthly	January 2025

==== Loans out ====
Player	Club	Loan period	Date
(France) Hugo Salabio	Castleford Tigers	End of season (Note: Recalled from loan in September 2025 to appear in squad to replace banned Jack Ashworth for fixtures against Warrington Wolves and Catalans Dragons.)	April 2025
(England) Will Kirkby	Hunslet R.L.F.C.	End of season	June 2025
(England) Denive Balmforth	Catalans Dragons	End of season (Note: Recalled from loan in September 2025 to appear in squad to replace banned Amir Bourouh for fixtures against Warrington Wolves and Catalans Dragons.)	June 2025

== Squad ==
2025 Hull F.C. Squad
First team squad			Coaching staff
1 (New Zealand) Jordan Rapana – WG, CE; 2 (England) Harvey Barron – WG; 3 (England) Zak Hardaker – CE; 4 (Ireland) Ed Chamberlain – CE; 5 (England) Tom Briscoe – WG; 6 (England) Will Pryce – HB, FB; 7 (Australia) Aidan Sezer (c) – HB; 8 (Samoa) Herman Ese'ese – PR; 9 (England) Amir Bourouh – HK; 10 (Samoa) Ligi Sao – PR, SR; 11 (Australia) Jed Cartwright – SR; 12 (England) Jordan Lane – SR, LF; 13 (Samoa) John Asiata (vc) – LF	14 (Australia) Cade Cust – HB; 16 (Turkey) Yusuf Aydin – PR; 17 (England) Jack Ashworth – SR; 19 (England) Brad Fash – LF, PR; 20 (England) Davy Litten – FB, WG; 21 (England) Will Gardiner – LF; 22 (England) Lewis Martin – WG; 23 (England) Logan Moy – FB; 24 (England) Jack Charles – SH, SO; 25 (England) Denive Balmforth – HK; 26 (England) Zach Jebson – SR; 27 (England) Matty Laidlaw – PR; 29 (England) Ryan Westerman – CE	30 (England) Callum Kemp – CE; 31 (France) Hugo Salabio – PR; 32 (England) Will Kirby – LF; 33 (England) Will Hutchinson – HK; 34 (England) Lloyd Kemp – FB; 35 (England) Joe Ward – WG; 36 (England) Owen Haldenby – PR; 37 (England) Lennon Clark – SR; 38 (England) Ben Johnson – CE; 39 (England) Sam Eseh Jnr – PR; 40 (Australia) Liam Knight – PR, LF; 41 (England) Liam Watts – PR	Head coach: (Australia) John Cartwright; Assistant coaches: (England) Andy Last; (England) Simon Grix; Legend: (c) Captain(s); (vc) Vice-captain(s); (red card) = suspended; = injured; (gk) = Goal kicker; Updated: 18 September 2025; Source(s): 2025 Squad Numbers
