= 2024 Hull FC season =

English rugby league team season

Hull F.C. 2024 season
- 2024 Super League season Rank: 11th
- Play-off result: Did not qualify
- Challenge Cup: 6th round
- 2024 record: Wins: 3; draws: 0; losses: 25
- Points scored: For: 328; against: 894

Team information
- Chairman: Adam Pearson
- Head Coach: Tony Smith (until Round 7); Simon Grix (interim from Round 7)
- Captain: Danny Houghton
- Stadium: MKM Stadium
- Avg. attendance: 10,975

Top scorers
- Tries: Lewis Martin (9)
- Goals: Jack Charles (21)
- Points: Jack Charles (42)
← 2023	List of seasons	2025 →

The 2024 season was Hull F.C.'s 27th consecutive season playing in England's top division of rugby league. During the season, they competed in the 2024 Super League and the 2024 Challenge Cup.

== Preseason friendlies ==
Date and time	Versus	H/A	Venue	Result	Score	Tries	Goals	Attendance	Report
14 January; 14:00	Bradford Bulls	A	Odsal Stadium	L	32–34	Bursell, Clark, Jebson, Balmforth, Martin	Harman (3/3), Charles (1/3)	Unknown	
21 January, 15:00	Doncaster RLFC	A	Eco-Power Stadium	W	42–24	Tindall (2), Cator, Hoy, Smith, Pele, J. Brown	Sutcliffe (4/5), McIntosh (3/3)	Unknown	

== Super League ==
=== Fixtures ===
Date and time	Round	Versus	H/A	Venue	Result	Score	Tries	Goals	Attendance	TV (Note: Ahead of 2024, Sky Sports announced they would be broadcasting all Super League matches over the next three seasons. Exact TV channels can be sourced by using WayBack Machine on RugbyLeagueOnTV. NB Not all games were broadcast on Sky Sports TV (advertised as "Sky Sports Exclusives"), with the remainder being broadcast using their on demand services accessible online or via red button. These games were made available on Super League+, and a select few on the BBC. Further, games on Main Event were also broadcast on Action or Arena.)	Pos.	Report
17 February, 17:30	Round 1	Hull Kingston Rovers	H	MKM Stadium	L	0–22			10,170	Sky Sports Main Event	11th	
23 February, 20:00	Round 2	Warrington Wolves	A	Halliwell Jones Stadium	L	10–36	Martin, Walker	McIntosh (1/2)	9,431	Sky Sports Arena	11th	
3 March, 15:00	Round 3	London Broncos	H	MKM Stadium	W	28–24	Staveley, Russell, Martin, F. Brown, Smith	McIntosh (4/5)	10,066	Sky Sports Arena	9th	
9 March, 17:30 (GMT)	Round 4	Catalans Dragons	A	Stade Gilbert Brutus	L	12–26	J. Brown, Walker	McIntosh (2/3)	9,140	Sky Sports Arena	9th	
16 March, 15:00	Round 5	Leigh Leopards	H	MKM Stadium	L	4–54	Hoy	McIntosh (0/1)	10,227	Sky Sports Action	10th	
29 March, 12:30 (Good Friday)	Round 6 (Rivals Round)	Hull Kingston Rovers	A	Craven Park	L	10–34	Okunbor, Scott	McIntosh (1/2)	Unknown	Sky Sports Main Event	10th	
6 April, 15:00	Round 7 (Note: Following this fixture, head coach Tony Smith and assistant coach Stanley Gene were sacked and replaced by interim coach Simon Grix and assistant Francis Cummins.)	Huddersfield Giants	H	MKM Stadium	L	22–56	Sutcliffe (2), F. Brown, Pele	Charles (3/4)	9,631	Sky Sports Main Event	11th	
19 April, 20:00	Round 8	St Helens	A	Totally Wicked Stadium	L	0–58			9,631	Sky Sports Mix	11th	
28 April, 15:00	Round 9	Leeds Rhinos	H	MKM Stadium	L	12–18	Smith, Martin	Charles (2/2)	10,505	Sky Sports Action	11th	
3 May, 20:00	Round 10	Warrington Wolves	A	Halliwell Jones Stadium	L	6–24	Briscoe	Charles (1/1)	8,680	Sky Sports Action	11th	
12 May, 15:00	Round 11	London Broncos	A	Plough Lane	L	18–34	Ese'ese, Trueman, Aydin	Charles (3/3)	3,225	Sky Sports Action	11th	
24 May, 20:00	Round 12	Castleford Tigers	A	Wheldon Road	L	22–30	Barron, Sutcliffe, Chan, Trueman	Reynolds (3/4)	8,269	Sky Sports Arena	11th	
31 May, 17:45	Round 13	Huddersfield Giants	A	Kirklees Stadium	L	18–24	Ese'ese, Moy, Scott	Reynolds (3/3)	4,102	Sky Sports Arena	11th	
15 June, 15:00	Round 14	Leeds Rhinos	H	MKM Stadium	W	18–10	Martin, Balmforth, Scott	Reynolds (3/3)	12,166	Sky Sports Action	11th	
22 June, 15:00	Round 15	Warrington Wolves	H	MKM Stadium	L	18–24	Balmforth, Sutcliffe, Briscoe	Reynolds (3/3)	10,083	Sky Sports Action	11th	
7 July, 15:00	Round 16	Salford Red Devils	A	Salford Community Stadium	L	18–24	Reynolds, Balmforth, Lane, Martin	Reynolds (2/4)	3,910	Sky Sports Action	11th	
13 July, 15:00	Round 17	Hull Kingston Rovers	H	MKM Stadium	L	10–24	Martin, Moy	Sutcliffe (1/3)	15,392	Sky Sports Arena	11th	
20 July, 14:00	Round 18	Wigan Warriors	H	MKM Stadium	W	24–22	Walker, Sutcliffe, Litten, Balmforth	Charles (4/4)	5,771	Sky Sports Arena	11th	
27 July, 17:00 (BST)	Round 19	Catalans Dragons	A	Stade Gilbert Brutus	L	16–24	Tuimavave, Walker, Martin	Charles (2/3)	9,214	Sky Sports Arena	11th	
3 August, 15:00	Round 20	St Helens	H	MKM Stadium	L	6–46	Walker	Lane (1/1)	9,885	Sky Sports Action	11th	
11 August, 15:00	Round 21	Leigh Leopards	A	Leigh Sports Village	L	12–42	Moy, Barron	Charles (2/2)	8,400	Sky Sports Action	11th	
17 August, 14:30	Round 22 (Magic Weekend)	London Broncos	N	Elland Road	L	4–29	Martin	Charles (0/1)	30,810	Sky Sports Action	11th	
25 August, 15:00	Round 23	Wigan Warriors	A	Brick Community Stadium	L	4–22	Cartwright	Charles (2/2)	8,400	Sky Sports +	11th	
31 August, 15:00	Round 24	Castleford Tigers	H	MKM Stadium	L	20–39	Barron (2), Sao, Tuimavave	Charles (2/4)	10,271	Sky Sports +	11th	
6 September, 20:00	Round 25	Leeds Rhinos	A	Headingley Rugby Stadium	L	6–68	Barron	Charles (1/1)	14,105	Sky Sports +	11th	
14 September, 17:05	Round 26	Salford Red Devils	H	MKM Stadium	L	4–58	Jebson	Charles (0/1)	9,274	BBC Two; Sky Sports +	12th	
21 September, 15:00	Round 27	Catalans Dragons	H	MKM Stadium	L	4–24	Martin	Lane (0/1)	9,384	Sky Sports +	11th	

=== Table ===
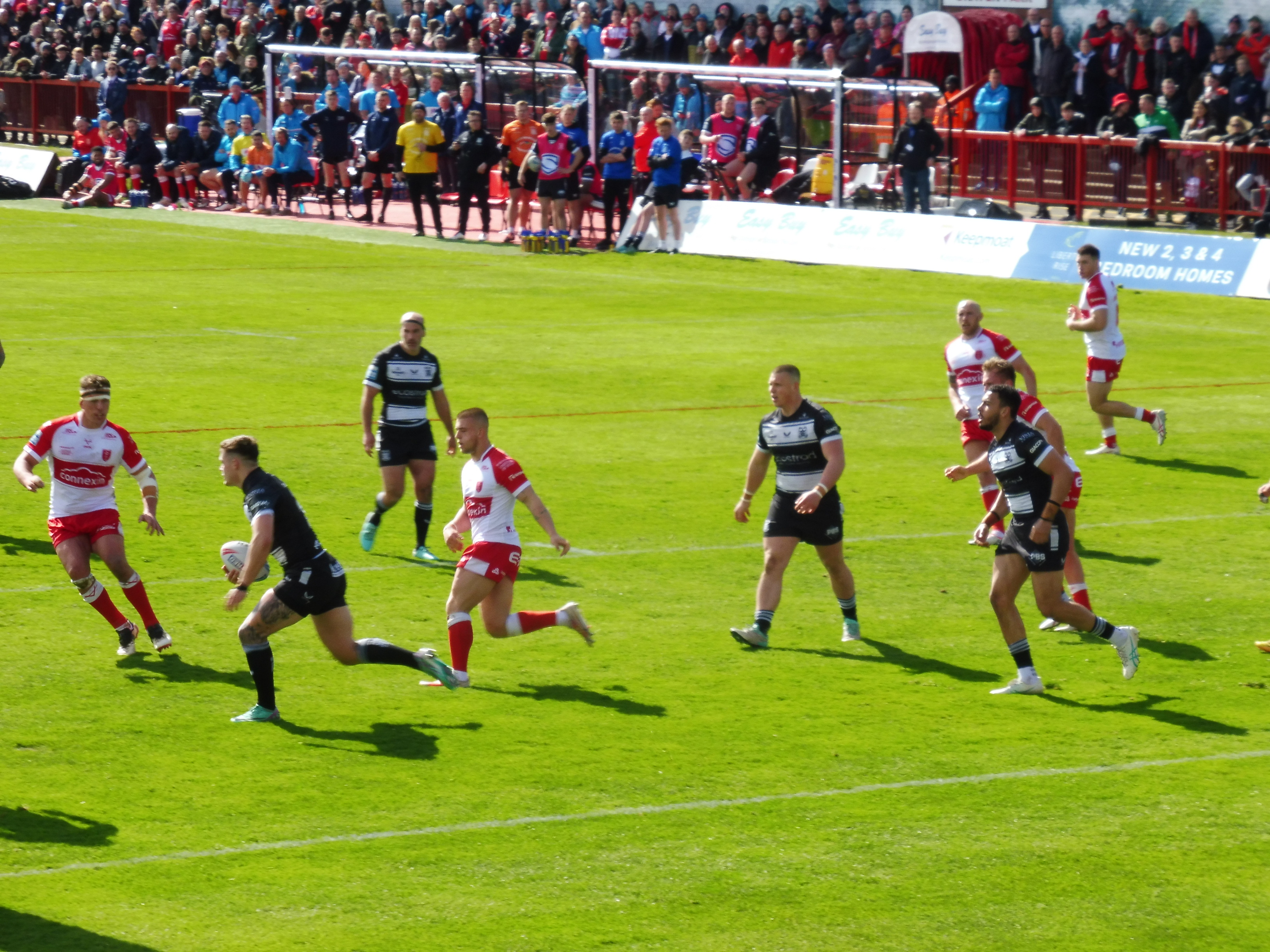
Hull F.C. playing against Hull Kingston Rovers at Craven Park during the first half of the 2024 Good Friday Derby

Pos	Team	Pld	W	D	L	PF	PA	PD	Pts	Qualification
1	Wigan Warriors (C)	27	22	0	5	723	338	+385	44	Advance to Semi-finals
2	Hull Kingston Rovers (Y)	27	21	0	6	719	326	+393	42	Advance to Semi-finals
3	Warrington Wolves	27	20	0	7	740	319	+421	40	Advance to Eliminators
4	Salford Red Devils	27	16	0	11	550	547	+3	32	Advance to Eliminators
5	Leigh Leopards	27	15	1	11	566	398	+168	31	Advance to Eliminators
6	St Helens	27	15	0	12	596	388	+208	30	Advance to Eliminators
7	Catalans Dragons	27	15	0	12	474	427	+47	30	
8	Leeds Rhinos	27	14	0	13	530	488	+42	28	
9	Huddersfield Giants	27	10	0	17	468	660	−192	20	
10	Castleford Tigers	27	7	1	19	425	735	−310	15	
11	Hull FC	27	3	0	24	328	894	−566	6	
12	London Broncos (R)	27	3	0	24	317	916	−599	6	Relegated to Championship

(C) Champions; (R) Relegated; (Y) Runners up

== Challenge Cup ==
Date and time	Round	Versus	H/A	Venue	Result	Score	Tries	Goals	Attendance	TV	Report
23 March; 14:00	Round 6	Huddersfield Giants	A	Kirklees Stadium	L	6–50	Lane	Charles (1/1)	1,673	Not Televised	

== Transfers ==
=== Gains ===
Player	Club	Contract	Date
(New Zealand) Herman Ese'ese	Dolphins	3 Years	August 2023
(Australia) Jayden Okunbor	Canterbury Bulldogs	2 Years	August 2023
(Australia) Franklin Pele	Canterbury Bulldogs	2 Years	September 2023
(England) Jack Walker	Hull Kingston Rovers	2 Years	September 2023
(England) Liam Tindall	Leeds Rhinos	2 Years	October 2023
(England) Jack Ashworth	Huddersfield Giants	2 Years	October 2023
(England) Morgan Smith	Wakefield Trinity	2 Years	October 2023
(France) Damel Diakhate	End of trial	1 Year	October 2023
(New Zealand) Fa'amanu Brown	Newcastle Knights	1 Year	October 2023
(England) Tom Briscoe	Leigh Leopards	1 1/2 Years	April 2024
(Australia) Jed Cartwright	Newcastle Knights	1 Year	June 2024 (Note: Brisbane Tigers player Treigh Stewart was also set to join Hull F.C. at the same time, however the club pulled out from signing Stewart on 11 June following allegations of an incident of domestic violence.)

==== Loans in ====
Player	Club	Loan period	Date
(Scotland) Matty Russell	Warrington Wolves	2 weeks	February 2024
(England) Joe Bullock	Warrington Wolves	2 weeks	February 2024
(Turkey) Yusuf Aydin	Hull Kingston Rovers	2 weeks	April 2024
(France) Tiaki Chan	Wigan Warriors	2 months	May 2024
(England) Ben Reynolds	Hull Kingston Rovers	End of season	May 2024
(Ireland) Ed Chamberlain	Leigh Leopards	End of season	July 2024
(Fiji) King Vuniyayawa	Salford Red Devils	End of season	July 2024
(England) Leon Ruan	Leeds Rhinos	End of season	August 2024

=== Losses ===
Player	Club	Contract	Date
(Fiji) Kane Evans	N/A	Released	May 2023
(Tonga) Chris Satae	Catalans Dragons	2 Years	May 2023
(England) Josh Griffin	Wakefield Trinity	1 Year	July 2023
(Australia) Jake Clifford	North Queensland Cowboys		August 2023
(England) Scott Taylor	N/A	Retirement	September 2023
(England) Jamie Shaul	N/A	Retirement	September 2023
(England) Adam Swift	Huddersfield Giants	3 Years	September 2023
(New Zealand) Andre Savelio	Huddersfield Giants	2 Years	October 2023
(England) Ben McNamara	Leigh Leopards	2 Years	October 2023
(England) Brad Dwyer	Warrington Wolves	2 Years	October 2023
(England) Connor Wynne	Featherstone Rovers		November 2023
(Wales) Jude Ferreria	Hunslet R.L.F.C.		November 2023
(Fiji) Joe Lovodua	Doncaster R.L.F.C.	2 Years	November 2023
(France) Damel Diakhate	Catalans Dragons	Rest of season	March 2024
(New Zealand) Fa'amanu Brown	St. George Illawarra Dragons	Rest of season	April 2024
(Australia) Tex Hoy	Castleford Tigers	Rest of season	April 2024
(England) Darnell McIntosh	Leigh Leopards	Rest of season	April 2024
(Australia) Franklin Pele	Bradford Bulls	Rest of season	June 2024
(Australia) Jayden Okunbor	Bradford Bulls	Rest of season	July 2024

== Squad ==
2024 Hull F.C. Squad
First team squad			Coaching staff
2 (England) Liam Tindall – WG; 3 (Samoa) Carlos Tuimavave (c) – CE; 4 (England) Liam Sutcliffe – CE (GK); 5 (England) Darnell McIntosh – WG (GK); 6 (England) Jake Trueman – SO; 8 (New Zealand) Herman Ese'ese – PR; 9 (England) Danny Houghton – HK; 10 (New Zealand) Franklin Pele – PR, SR; 11 (Australia) Jayden Okunbor – SR; 12 (Samoa) Ligi Sao – PR, SR; 13 (England) Brad Fash – PR, LF, SR; 14 (England) Joe Cator – LF, SR; 15 (England) Jordan Lane – SR, LF (GK)	16 (England) Jack Ashworth – SR; 17 (England) Cameron Scott – CE, WG, SR; 19 (England) Morgan Smith – HB; 20 (England) Jack Brown – PR; 21 (England) Will Gardiner – LF; 22 (Fiji) Mitieli Vulikijapani – CE, WG; 23 (England) Davy Litten – FB, WG; 24 (England) Nick Staveley – SR; 25 (England) Harvey Barron – WG; 26 (England) Lewis Martin – WG; 27 (England) Zach Jebson – SR; 28 (England) Denive Balmforth – HK; 29 (England) Charlie Severs – SR	30 (England) Matty Laidlaw – PR; 31 (England) Jack Walker – FB; 37 (England) Logan Moy – FB	Head coach: (Ireland) Simon Grix (interim); Assistant coach: (England) Francis Cummins (interim); Legend: (c) Captain(s); (vc) Vice-captain(s); (gk) = Goal kicker; Updated: 20 December 2023; Source(s): 2024 Squad Numbers
