= Chris Charles (disambiguation) =

Chris Charles may refer to:

- Chris Charles (born 1976), English former professional footballer
- Chris Charles (basketball) (born 1981), American former basketball player
- Chris Charles (actor), British actor
