= Darnell McIntosh =

English rugby league footballer

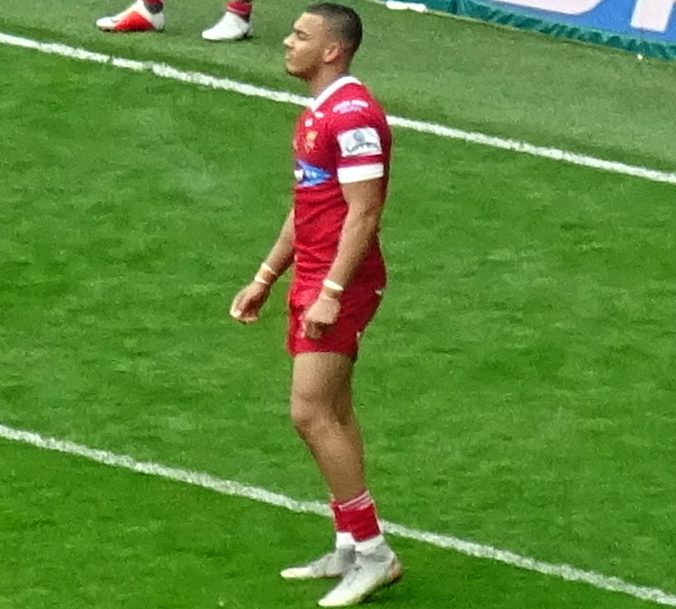

Personal information
- Born: 5 July 1997 (age 29) Huddersfield, West Yorkshire, England
- Height: 6 ft 1 in (1.85 m)
- Weight: 14 st 9 lb (93 kg)

Playing information
- Position: Centre, Wing, Fullback
Club
| Years | Team | Pld | T | G | FG | P |
|---|---|---|---|---|---|---|
| 2016–21 | Huddersfield Giants | 99 | 46 | 12 | 0 | 208 |
| 2016(loan) | → Oldham | 1 | 0 | 0 | 0 | 0 |
| 2017(loan) | → Oldham | 1 | 1 | 0 | 0 | 4 |
| 2022–24 | Hull F.C. | 53 | 23 | 16 | 0 | 124 |
| 2024–25 | Leigh Leopards | 29 | 10 | 11 | 0 | 62 |
| 2026– | Castleford Tigers | 14 | 3 | 0 | 0 | 12 |
| | Total | 197 | 83 | 39 | 0 | 410 |
- Source: As of 5 July 2026

Darnell McIntosh (born 5 July 1997) is an English professional rugby league footballer who plays as a centre, winger or fullback for the Castleford Tigers in the Super League.

He has previously played for the Huddersfield Giants, Hull F.C. and the Leigh Leopards in the Super League. He has spent time on loan or dual registration at Oldham in the RFL Championship.

== Background ==
McIntosh was born in Huddersfield, West Yorkshire, England. He is of Grenadian heritage.

McIntosh is a product of the Giants' scholarship system and was called up to the England Knights squad along with 3 other Giants players in 2019.

== Career ==
=== Huddersfield Giants ===
McIntosh spent time on loan at Oldham in 2016.

In round 3 of the 2021 Super League season, he scored two tries for Huddersfield in a 25-24 loss against Hull Kingston Rovers.

=== Hull F.C. ===
In round 11 of the 2022 Super League season, he scored a hat-trick in Hull F.C.'s 48-12 win over Toulouse Olympique.

In round 1 of the 2023 Super League season, McIntosh scored two tries for Hull F.C. against Castleford which ended in a 32–30 victory. He played a total of twenty-one games for Hull F.C. for in the 2023 Super League season and scored ten tries as the club finished 10th on the table.

=== Leigh Leopards ===
On 23 April 2024, it was confirmed that McIntosh had signed for Leigh Leopards in a player swap deal that saw Hull F.C. receive Tom Briscoe in return.

=== Castleford Tigers ===
On 13 October 2025, Castleford Tigers announced the signing of McIntosh on a two-year deal. He was assigned squad number 4 for the 2026 season. He made his debut against Doncaster in the Challenge Cup, and scored his first try for the club in round 3 against Huddersfield Giants. In round 6, he scored two tries in Castleford's 40–28 victory over Bradford Bulls. With Semi Valemei and Louis Senior returning from injury, McIntosh lost his starting place from round 12. On his return to the team in round 17 at Magic Weekend, he suffered a groin injury and was unable to feature for the remainder of 2026.

== Statistics ==
Appearances and points in all competitions by year
| Club | Season | Tier | App | T | G | DG | Pts |
|---|---|---|---|---|---|---|---|
| Huddersfield Giants | 2017 | Super League | 24 | 13 | 0 | 0 | 52 |
| Huddersfield Giants | 2018 | Super League | 22 | 14 | 2 | 0 | 60 |
| Huddersfield Giants | 2019 | Super League | 29 | 12 | 10 | 0 | 68 |
| Huddersfield Giants | 2020 | Super League | 13 | 3 | 0 | 0 | 12 |
| Huddersfield Giants | 2021 | Super League | 11 | 4 | 0 | 0 | 16 |
| Huddersfield Giants | Total | | 99 | 46 | 12 | 0 | 208 |
| → Oldham RLFC (loan) | 2016 | Championship | 1 | 0 | 0 | 0 | 0 |
| → Oldham RLFC (loan) | 2017 | Championship | 1 | 1 | 0 | 0 | 4 |
| → Oldham RLFC (loan) | Total | | 2 | 1 | 0 | 0 | 4 |
| Hull FC | 2022 | Super League | 22 | 13 | 6 | 0 | 64 |
| Hull FC | 2023 | Super League | 22 | 10 | 2 | 0 | 44 |
| Hull FC | 2024 | Super League | 9 | 0 | 8 | 0 | 16 |
| Hull FC | Total | | 53 | 23 | 16 | 0 | 124 |
| Leigh Leopards | 2024 | Super League | 16 | 5 | 11 | 0 | 42 |
| Leigh Leopards | 2025 | Super League | 13 | 5 | 0 | 0 | 20 |
| Leigh Leopards | Total | | 29 | 10 | 11 | 0 | 62 |
| Castleford Tigers | 2026 | Super League | 14 | 3 | 0 | 0 | 12 |
| Career total | | | 197 | 83 | 39 | 0 | 410 |

As of match played 5 July 2026
