= Jordan Lane (rugby league) =

English professional rugby league footballer

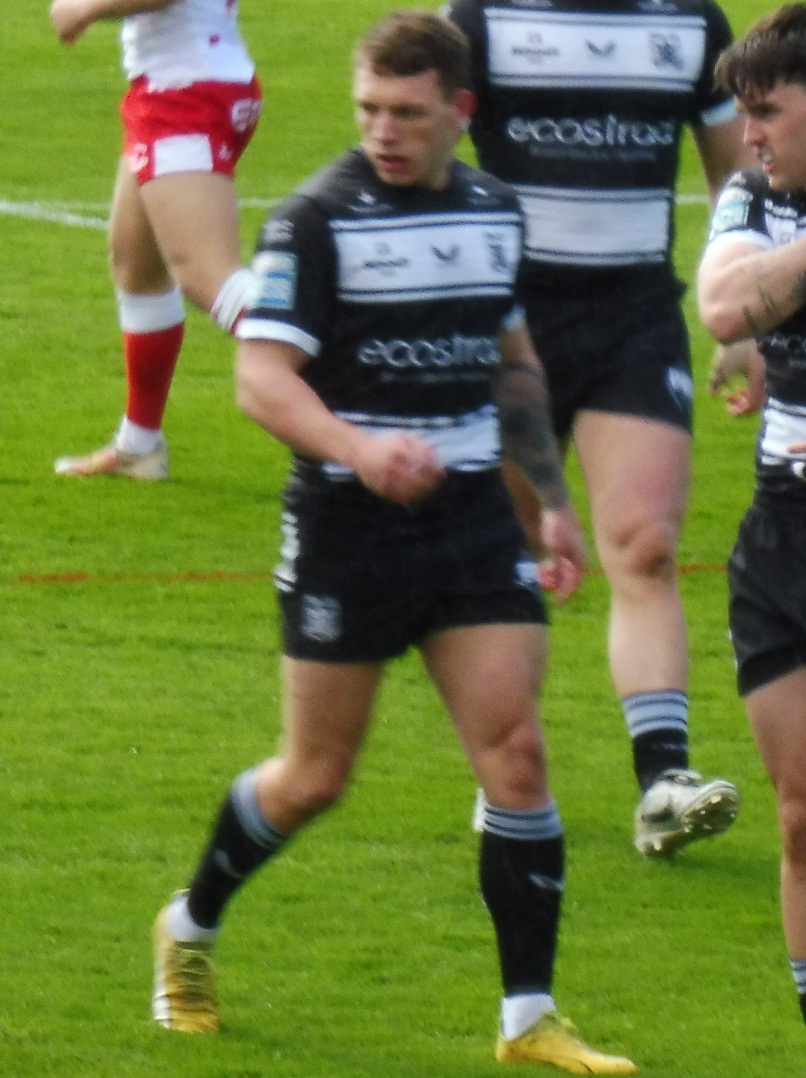

Personal information
- Full name: Jordan Lane
- Born: 20 October 1997 (age 29) Hull, East Riding of Yorkshire, England
- Height: 5 ft 10 in (1.79 m)
- Weight: 15 st 10 lb (100 kg)

Playing information
- Position: Second-row, Loose forward
Club
Years	Team	Pld	T	G	FG	P
2018–25	Hull F.C.	163	20	2	0	84
2017(loan)	→ Doncaster	1	1	0	0	4
2018(loan)	→ Doncaster	5	0	0	0	0
2019(loan)	→ Doncaster	1	0	0	0	0
2026–	Castleford Tigers	27	1	0	0	4
	Total	197	22	2	0	92
Representative
Years	Team	Pld	T	G	FG	P
2022	England Knights	1	0	0	0	0
- Source: As of 12 September 2026

Jordan Lane (born 20 October 1997) is an English professional rugby league player who plays as a second-row forward for the Castleford Tigers in the Super League.

He has previously played for Hull FC in the Super League. He has spent time on loan at Doncaster in League 1.

== Background ==
Lane was born in Kingston upon Hull, East Riding of Yorkshire, England.

== Career ==
=== Hull FC ===
In 2018, Lane made his Super League debut for Hull against Leeds Rhinos.

In September 2019, Lane was awarded with Hull FC's Young Player of the Year award.

Lane played twenty-six matches for Hull FC in the 2023 Super League season as the club finished 10th on the table.

==== Doncaster RLFC (loan) ====
In October 2017, Lane agreed to join Doncaster on loan for the 2018 season.

=== Castleford Tigers ===
On 10 September 2025, Castleford Tigers announced the signing of Lane on a four-year deal. Director of rugby Chris Chester described him as "a high-energy player who leads with his actions on the field and is also a very good leader off it." He was assigned squad number 11 for the 2026 season, and made his debut against Doncaster in the Challenge Cup. Lane operated primarily in his native position of second row, although also deputised at hooker and loose forward due to injuries to teammates. He missed two matches in July due to a failed head injury assessment and a hip flexor injury, though was otherwise ever-present and made twenty-seven appearances. He scored his first try for Castleford in the final round of the season against Huddersfield.

== Club statistics ==
Appearances and points in all competitions by year
Club	Season	Tier	App	T	G	DG	Pts
Hull FC	2018	Super League	17	1	0	0	4
Hull FC	2019	Super League	16	3	0	0	12
Hull FC	2020	Super League	13	3	0	0	12
Hull FC	2021	Super League	22	2	0	0	8
Hull FC	2022	Super League	26	5	0	0	20
Hull FC	2023	Super League	28	2	0	0	8
Hull FC	2024	Super League	27	2	1	0	10
Hull FC	2025	Super League	14	2	1	0	10
Hull FC	Total		163	20	2	0	84
→ Doncaster RLFC (loan)	2017	Super League	1	1	0	0	4
→ Doncaster RLFC (loan)	2018	Super League	5	0	0	0	0
→ Doncaster RLFC (loan)	2019	Super League	1	0	0	0	0
→ Doncaster RLFC (loan)	Total		7	1	0	0	4
Castleford Tigers	2026	Super League	27	1	0	0	4
Castleford Tigers	2027	Super League	0	0	0	0	0
Castleford Tigers	Total		27	1	0	0	4
Career total			197	22	2	0	92

As of match played 12 September 2026
