= Bryce Cartwright =

Australian rugby league footballer

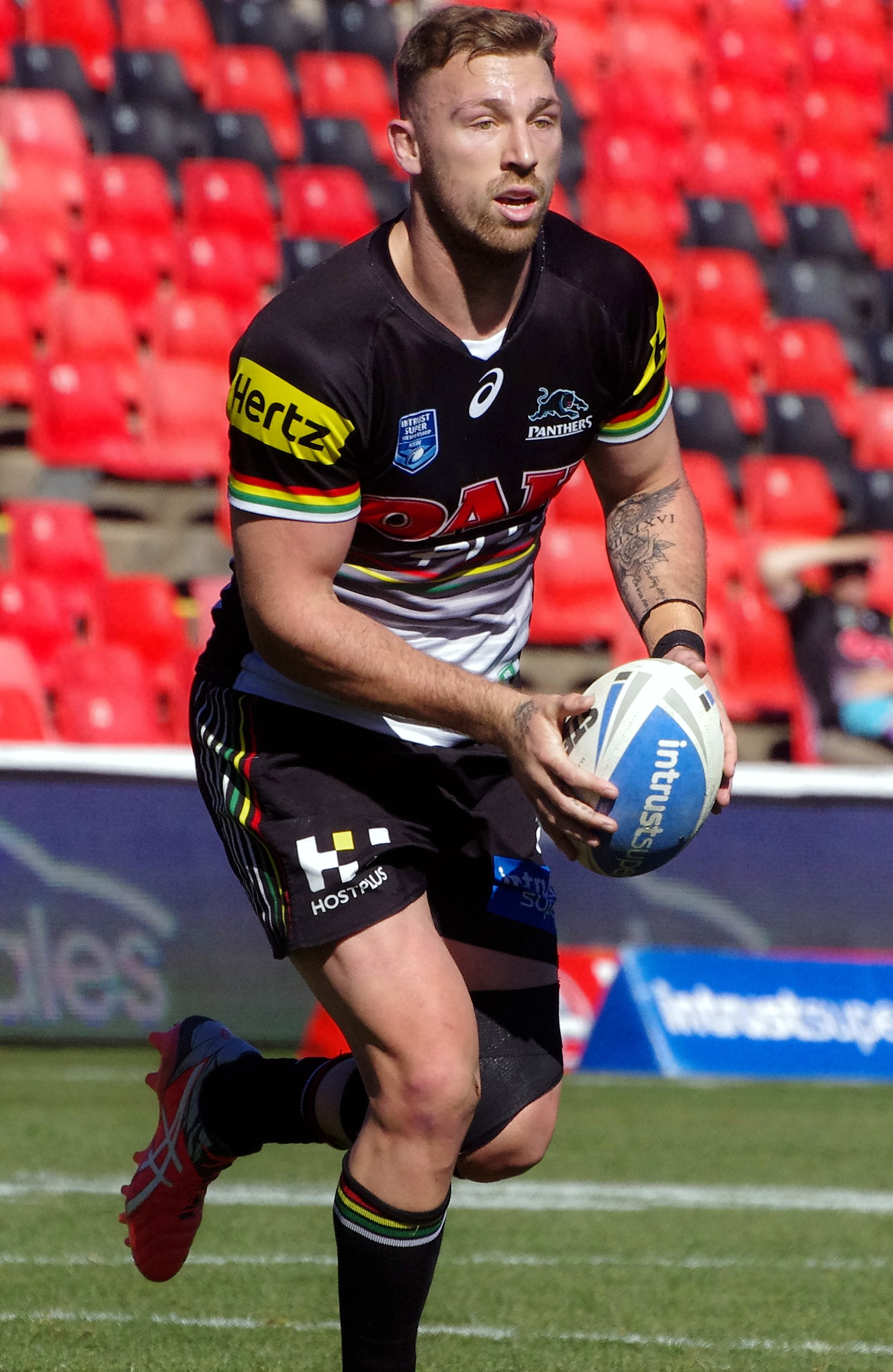

Personal information
- Full name: Bryce Cartwright
- Born: 15 November 1994 (age 32) Penrith, New South Wales, Australia
- Height: 193 cm (6 ft 4 in)
- Weight: 112 kg (17 st 9 lb)

Playing information
- Position: Second-row, Five-eighth
Club
Years	Team	Pld	T	G	FG	P
2014–17	Penrith Panthers	69	16	0	0	64
2018–20	Gold Coast Titans	43	4	0	0	16
2021–24	Parramatta Eels	73	15	0	0	60
	Total	185	35	0	0	140
Representative
Years	Team	Pld	T	G	FG	P
2016–17	NSW City	2	1	0	0	4
- Source: As of 6 September 2024
- Education: Patrician Brothers' College, Blacktown
- Relatives: John Cartwright (uncle); Jed Cartwright (cousin)

Bryce Cartwright (born 15 November 1994) is an Australian semi-professional rugby league footballer who plays for St Marys Saints in the Ron Massey Cup.

Cartwright previously played as a second-row forward for the Penrith Panthers, Gold Coast Titans, and Parramatta Eels in the National Rugby League (NRL). He has also played for New South Wales City and the World All Stars at representative level.

== Early life ==
Cartwright was born in Penrith, New South Wales, Australia.

He played his junior football for St Mary's Saints before being signed by the Penrith Panthers. Cartwright attended Patrician Brothers' College, Blacktown.

== Playing career ==
From 2012 to 2014, Cartwright played for the Penrith Panthers' NYC team.

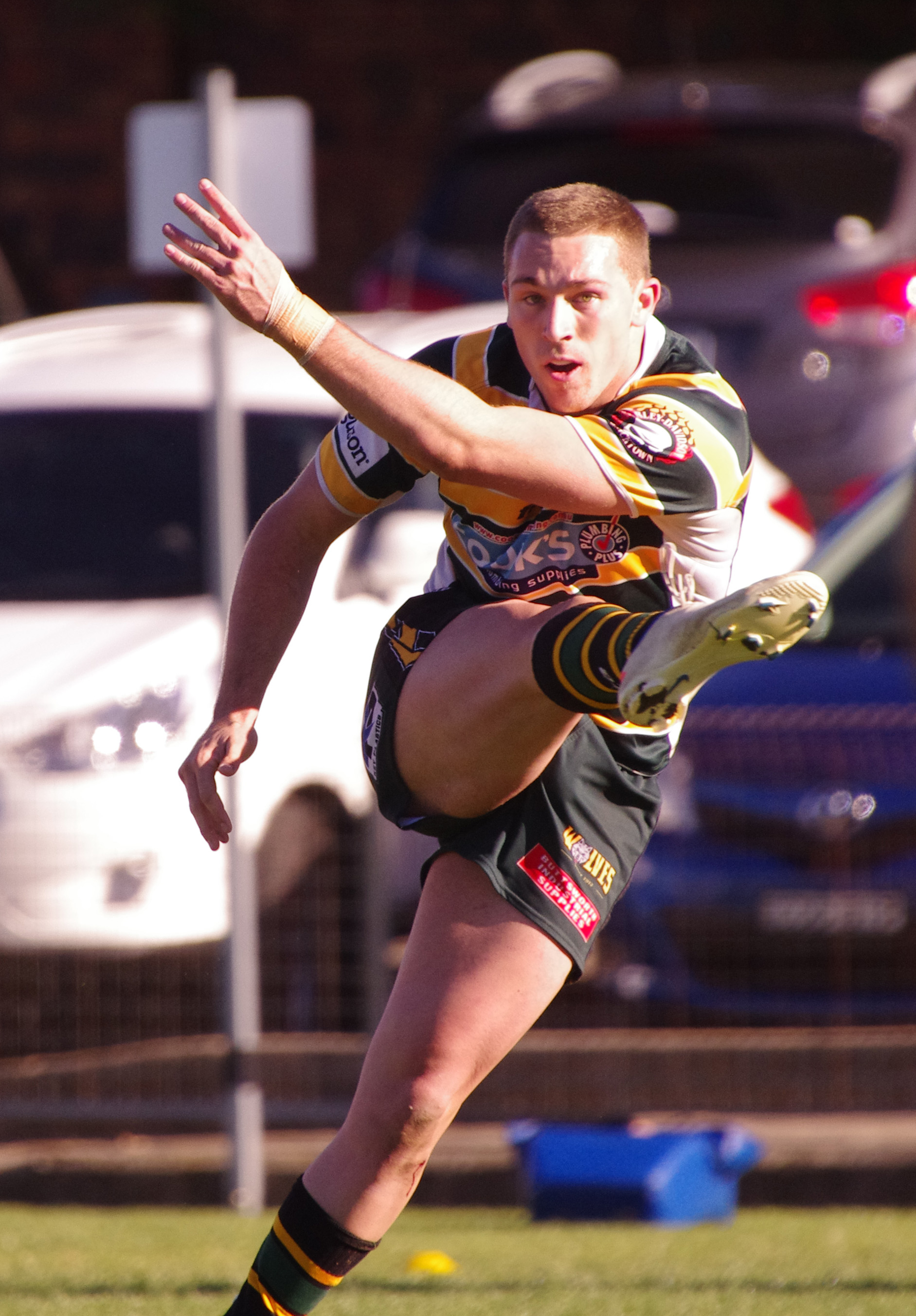
Cartwright playing for the Windsor Wolves in 2013.

In April 2013, Cartwright re-signed with the Panthers on a 2-year contract.

At the end of 2013, Cartwright was named at second-row in the 2013 NYC Team of the Year, won the 2013 NYC Player of the Year award, played in the Panthers' 2013 NYC Grand Final win over the New Zealand Warriors and played for the Junior Kangaroos.

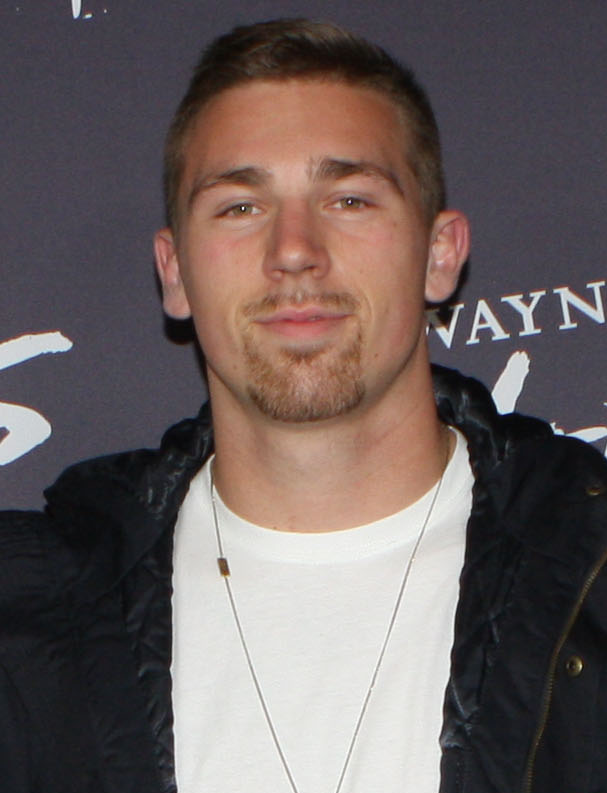
Cartwright at the premiere of Hercules

=== 2014 ===
In Round 12 of the 2014 NRL season, Cartwright made his NRL debut for the Panthers against the Parramatta Eels off the bench in the Panthers 38–12 win at Penrith Stadium. In Round 19 against the Sydney Roosters at SFS, Cartwright scored his first NRL career try in the Panthers 32–12 loss. In Round 21 against the Canterbury-Bankstown Bulldogs, Cartwright suffered a season ending ankle injury in the Panthers' 22–16 win at ANZ Stadium. Cartwright finished his debut year in the NRL with him playing in 7 matches and scoring a try for the Panthers in the 2014 season. On 9 September 2014, Cartwright extended his contract with the Panthers from the end of 2015 to the end of 2018.

=== 2015 ===
Cartwright finished off the 2015 season having played in 22 matches and scoring 5 tries for the Panthers.

=== 2016 ===
In February 2016, Cartwright was named in the Panthers 2016 NRL Auckland Nines squad. In Round 5, Cartwright scored the winning try on the final siren against the Parramatta Eels at Parramatta Stadium giving the Panthers the 20–18 victory. On 8 May 2016, Cartwright played for New South Wales City against New South Wales Country where he started at second-row in the 44–30 win in Tamworth. Cartwright's good form during the season saw him selected in the New South Wales Blues training squad but did not make his expected origin debut. In mid-way during the season, after the Panthers released seasoned five-eighth Jamie Soward to England and a long extended shoulder injury to rookie half Te Maire Martin, Cartwright stepped up from second-row to make the five-eighth position his own alongside boom rookie halfback Nathan Cleary, playing some exciting footy as a young halves combo to lead the Panthers into a late season finals charge. On 22 September 2016, Cartwright extended his contract with Panthers to the end of the 2021 season. Cartwright finished the 2016 NRL season with him playing in all of the Panthers 26 matches, scoring 8 tries.

=== 2017 ===
On 10 February, Cartwright played in the 2017 All Stars match for the World All Stars, where he started at second-row in the 34–8 loss at Hunter Stadium. In Round 11 against the Newcastle Knights, Cartwright suffered a knee injury during the 30–20 win and was sidelined for 10 matches. He returned in round 21 against the Canterbury-Bankstown Bulldogs, playing off the interchange bench in the 16–8 win. Cartwright finished his 2017 NRL season with 14 matches and 2 tries.

=== 2018 ===
On 4 February, Cartwright was granted a release from his contract with Penrith to sign with the Gold Coast Titans effectively to play under new coach Garth Brennan who previously coached the Panthers Holden Cup and NSW Cup teams to premiership winning success. Cartwright said of his sudden signing "I've always had a close relationship with Garth so we spoke regularly. We spoke in October and he mentioned it to me and I didn't really think too much about it. It was getting closer to the footy season and I felt as though if I was going to stay there I wasn't going to get as much time on the field. If I was to improve as a player and get to where I want to be this was the best place to do it. I'm going to be working hard and still fighting my way into the team here and earn the respect from everyone else."

In Round 1 of the season, Cartwright made his club debut for the Titans against the Canberra Raiders, starting at lock in the 30–28 win at Robina Stadium. In round 6, Cartwright played against his former club, Penrith Panthers, with an upset 12–35 loss. Following Gold Coast's round 12 34–14 defeat by the Eastern Suburbs, Cartwright was demoted to reserve grade by coach Garth Brennan due to inconsistent form. Less than a day after being demoted, Cartwright broke his hand in a freak training accident and was ruled out for 3 weeks.

=== 2019 ===
In early 2019 Cartwright admitted not putting in enough hard work the previous year and hoped that in the 2019 season he could atone for a disappointing 2018. Cartwright made a total of 23 appearances and scored 3 tries for the Gold Coast in the 2019 NRL season as the club endured a horror year on and off the field. The Gold Coast managed to win only 4 games for the entire season and finished last claiming the Wooden Spoon. In the context of Cartwright's refusal to be vaccinated, it was reported that in 2019 Cartwright missed a game with the Titans after he came down with a bout of influenza.

=== 2020 ===
Cartwright initially refused the 2020 NRL season's mandatory flu vaccination on 'pro-choice' grounds creating a standoff with the NRL in Round 3. At the time Simon Brunsdon from Fox Sports said "he's no real loss to any team". Shortly before being permanently stood down from the team, Cartwright obtained medical documentation seeking an exemption from immunisation and was finally cleared to play, but had missed a week of training disadvantaging him from the starting lineup.

On 17 September, Cartwright was released by the Gold Coast club effective immediately. Cartwright signed a one-year deal with the Parramatta Eels for the 2021 season.

=== 2021 ===
On 13 February, Cartwright broke his jaw during a tackle at pre-season training and was ruled out for six weeks, meaning he would miss the start of the 2021 NRL season. In round 5 of the 2021 NRL season, Cartwright made his debut for Parramatta against St. George Illawarra at Bankwest Stadium. In round 7, Cartwright scored his first try for Parramatta in a 46-6 victory over Brisbane. On 12 August, Cartwright signed a two-year contract extension to remain at Parramatta. Cartwright played 19 games for Parramatta in the 2021 NRL season including the club's two finals matches. Parramatta were eliminated from the semi-final stage of the competition for a third straight season.

=== 2022 ===
Cartwright played ten matches for Parramatta in the 2022 NRL season. Cartwright was left out of Parramatta's first two finals matches with Jakob Arthur replacing him on the interchange bench. Cartwright was then selected for Parramatta in their preliminary final victory over North Queensland. For the 2022 NRL Grand Final, Cartwright was controversially left out of the team with Arthur once again replacing him on the bench. Parramatta would go on to lose the final 28-12 against Penrith.

=== 2023 ===
In round 23 of the 2023 NRL season, Cartwright scored two tries for Parramatta in their 26-20 victory over St. George Illawarra. Cartwright played a total of 24 matches for Parramatta in the 2023 NRL season as the club finished 10th on the table. On 25 September, Cartwright re-signed with Parramatta until the end of 2025.

=== 2024 ===
In round 1 of the 2024 NRL season, Cartwright scored two tries as Parramatta defeated arch-rivals Canterbury 28-6. On 26 March, it was announced that Cartwright would be ruled out for at least a month with a rib injury. Cartwright played 20 games for Parramatta throughout the season as the club finished 15th on the table.

=== 2025 ===
On 17 June, the Parramatta club announced that Cartwright was released from the reminder of his contract to pursue opportunities elsewhere. On 13 September, Cartwright played in St Mary's Ron Massey Cup Grand Final victory over Wentworthville.

== Personal life ==
Cartwright is the nephew of former Penrith Panthers and Salford player and former Gold Coast Titans coach, John Cartwright. His ex-wife Shanelle Cartwright is a social media influencer.

=== Pregnancy and death of ex-girlfriend ===
On 6 March 2017, it was reported that Cartwright's ex-girlfriend had become pregnant to him. The woman later claimed she was pressured into terminating the pregnancy in exchange for $50,000. Cartwright reportedly sent text messages to the woman when he discovered she was pregnant saying, "You do realise there is no way I'll be at the birth? We won't keep in contact at all". Lou Zivanovic, who has links with the Panthers, was hired by Cartwright as a 'fixer' to assist with this personal matter. The woman went on to say "I felt I had no other option than to get rid of the baby, the pressure was relentless". She went on further to say, "I was bullied by Bryce and Lou. They showed no compassion toward the baby and me".

His ex-girlfriend had previously been charged with stalking him in December 2016 but the charges were subsequently dismissed. On 2 August 2017 she was found dead at her home in Western Sydney, and according to the police report her death was not believed to be suspicious. It came in the wake of Cartwright having private photos of himself being posted online which the media classified as revenge porn. She also allegedly sent explicit and threatening text messages to Cartwright.

== Health and vaccination dissension ==
Cartwright has a substantial anti-vax following on social media and has been dubbed a "poster boy" for the anti-vax movement.

=== Family's alternative health views ===
Cartwright and his now ex-wife Shanelle reportedly suffer from "allergies and auto-immune disorders", and "don't trust hospitals".

Both have made statements publicly which led to the media referring to them as 'anti-vaxxers', but Cartwright rejects this term, saying he is "pro-choice, pro-informed consent and pro-medical freedom". On immunisation they have been influenced by a discredited book written by American homoeopath Suzanne Humphries. His wife believes that the COVID-19 pandemic is a "scam" and in the conspiracy theory that the flu shot increases its likelihood by 36%. Cartwright initially took some time to come around to his ex-wife's belief that vaccines are harmful, despite the overwhelming scientific evidence contradicting this, and has now become a prominent critic of vaccines. Cartwright's ex-wife has questioned the manliness of NRL players who have not supported his position on vaccines.

In relation to their children and immunisation Cartwright's wife has stated, "They can go to ex-school [so far] ... if the law changes, I'll home-school before I vaccinate". She has also said she will encourage her newborn go to the toilet in the garden rather than use nappies.

Sports commentator Erin Molan condemned Cartwright's ex-wife for publicly making an "incredibly dangerous" comparison between anti-vaxxers and Holocaust victims. The AMA President has warned against, and Gold Coast GPs have criticised the anti-vaccination messages spread by the Cartwright's saying they "don't have the right to put the rest of the public at risk either through their opinions or actions." Ex-celebrities Koby Abberton, Isabel Lucas and Pete Evans rallied behind Cartwright in support of his anti-vaccination stance.

=== 2020 NRL flu-vax controversy ===
During the 2020 COVID-19 pandemic, the NRL brought in strict new biosecurity measures in Round 3 to protect those in the game, including a code-wide request that players be vaccinated against the flu, as "any player that has any respiratory illness... potentially will take the whole team out." Cartwright refused the vaccine, instead signing a waiver on 'pro-choice' grounds. He was stood down from the Titans after the Queensland Government stood by the flu vaccination measures previously agreed to by the NRL that 100% of players would be vaccinated prior to the competition restarting. Ten days later Cartwright provided medical documentation seeking an exemption and was given a last minute reprieve from suspension. NRL commentator Paul Kent said "Cartwright objected to getting the flu shot because he was pro-choice, next minute he has produced a letter from a doctor saying he had medical reasons after it became apparent that the Queensland government was not going to allow him to play... The whole thing is a cook up and anyone that can't see that is an idiot." BuzzFeed reported that since entering the flu-vax standoff with the NRL Cartwright's social media following in anti-vax circles had grown substantially, and that the Bryce Cartwright Support Group on Facebook had "pivoted into general anti-vaccination campaigning" and had grown by more than 5,700 members during the standoff.
