= Lew Zivanovic =

Australian rugby league footballer

Personal information
- Full name: Lew Zivanovic
- Born: 20 October 1959 (age 67) Penrith, New South Wales, Australia

Playing information
- Position: Second-row, Prop, Lock
Club
Years	Team	Pld	T	G	FG	P
1979–86	Penrith Panthers	116	5	0	0	15
- Source: As of 16 July 2019

Lew Zivanovic, also known as Lou Zivanovic, (born 20 October 1959 in Penrith, New South Wales) is an Australian former professional rugby league footballer who played in the 1970s and 1980s. He played for the Penrith Panthers in the New South Wales Rugby League competition, primarily as a second-row, but also as a prop or lock.

== Playing career ==
A Wentworthville Magpies junior, Zivanovic was a tireless worker in both attack and defence in his seven years at the Penrith club, often topping the tackling tables for his side. He retired after the 1986 season because of outside work commitments. Zivanovic played in Penrith's first ever finals campaign in 1985 and featured in both matches against Manly and Parramatta.

== Personal life ==
On 6 March 2017, it was revealed that then Penrith player Bryce Cartwright was involved in an affair with another woman and had got her pregnant. Zivanovic was named in the scandal by the anonymous woman and was alleged to have brokered a $50,000 abortion contract with the woman. The anonymous woman claimed later on she was pressured into terminating the pregnancy in exchange for $50,000. Cartwright reportedly sent text messages to the woman when he discovered she was pregnant saying “You do realise there is no way I’ll be at the birth, We won’t keep in contact at all". The anonymous woman went on to say “I felt I had no other option than to get rid of the baby, the pressure was relentless," she said. "I was bullied by Bryce and Lou. They showed no compassion towards the baby and me".

In 2018, it was revealed that Zivanovic had been banned from managing a company for three years after 18 of his building companies went into receivership. According to the ASIC, creditors were left with unpaid debts of $26.8 million.
