= Chris Charles =

England international rugby league footballer

Personal information
- Full name: Christopher Charles
- Born: 7 March 1976 (age 50)

Playing information
- Position: Hooker, Second-row, Loose forward
Club
Years	Team	Pld	T	G	FG	P
1993–02	Hull Kingston Rovers	231	41	304	1	731
2001	→ Castleford Tigers (loan)	7	2	0	0	8
2003–06	Salford	54	13	0	0	52
2007	Castleford Tigers	32	5	2	0	24
2008	Dewsbury Rams	6	1	0	0	4
	Total	330	62	306	1	819
Representative
Years	Team	Pld	T	G	FG	P
2005	England	1
- Children: Jack Charles

Chris Charles (born 7 March 1976) is an English former professional rugby league footballer who played in the 1990s and 2000s. He played at representative level for England, and at club level for Hull Kingston Rovers, Salford and Castleford Tigers (two spells), as a hooker, second-row, or loose forward.

== Playing career ==
=== Club career ===
Charles made 231 appearances for Hull Kingston Rovers between 1993 and 2002. He played for the club at Wembley in the 1997 Challenge Plate final.

=== International honours ===
Charles won a cap for England while at Salford in 2005 against France.

== Personal life ==
His son, Jack Charles, is a professional rugby league player who will play for Hull Kingston Rovers in 2026 and who played for cross-city rivals Hull F.C. between 2024 and 2025, as well as for Doncaster R.L.F.C. on loan in the RFL Championship during 2025.
