= John Cartwright (rugby league) =

Australian RL coach and former Australia international rugby league footballer

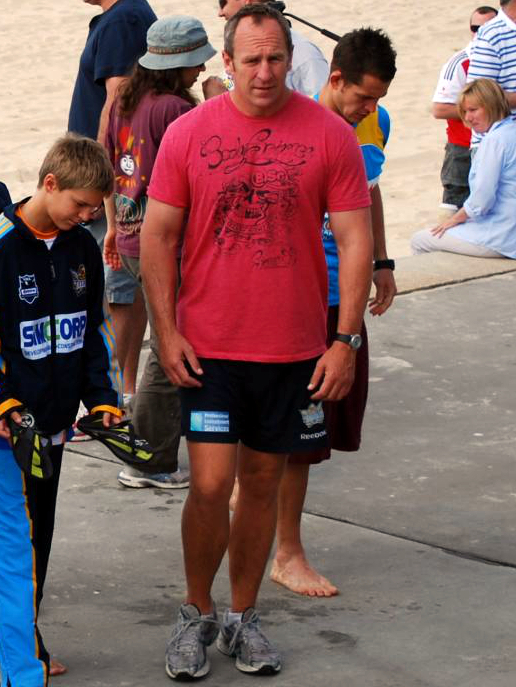

Personal information
- Born: 9 August 1965 (age 61) Penrith, New South Wales, Australia
- Height: 6 ft 2 in (1.88 m)
- Weight: 17 st 0 lb (108 kg)

Playing information
- Position: Second-row
Club
Years	Team	Pld	T	G	FG	P
1985–96	Penrith Panthers	188	14	0	0	56
1997	Salford Reds	16	3	0	0	12
	Total	204	17	0	0	68
Representative
Years	Team	Pld	T	G	FG	P
1989–92	New South Wales	8	1	0	0	4
1990–92	Australia	18	0	0	0	0

Coaching information
Club
Years	Team	Gms	W	D	L	W%
2007–14	Gold Coast Titans	192	87	0	105	45
2025–26	Hull F.C.	40	19	1	20	48
2026–	Catalans Dragons	16	5	0	11	31
	Total	248	111	1	136	45
Representative
Years	Team	Gms	W	D	L	W%
2009–11	City Origin	3	1	0	2	33
2004	USA	1	0	0	1	0
- Source: As of 22 November 2026
- Relatives: Jed Cartwright (son); Bryce Cartwright (nephew)

John Cartwright (born 9 August 1965) is an Australian professional rugby league coach who is the head coach of the Catalans Dragons in the Super League and a former professional rugby league footballer.

He was the head coach for the Gold Coast Titans. A "strong running and skilful passing" Australian international and New South Wales State of Origin representative second-row forward, Cartwright played his club football with the Penrith Panthers, winning the 1991 premiership with them.

== Playing career ==
Cartwright began with Penrith in 1985 and was a regular first-grade player by 1987.

In 1988, under the guidance of Ron Willey, Penrith developed a heavyweight, aggressive forward pack of which Cartwright and second row partner Mark Geyer were the cornerstones.

Cartwright had a sudden rise through representative ranks in 1989. Initially not chosen for the City Origin team, he took his place in the firsts team after a spate of injuries. John was the named on the bench for New South Wales for the first State of Origin match. Unfortunately, a late injury to Ian Roberts forced him to play in the front row, to which Cartwright was ill-suited, and he was dropped after one match. At the end of the year, Cartwright was sent off against Balmain and suspended for four matches. Penrith were thrashed 33-6 and could not win either of their two finals without Cartwright. On returning from suspension, Cartwright found form very quickly and at the end of the 1990 NSWRL season, Cartwright went on the 1990 Kangaroo tour of Great Britain and France but was dropped after one Test.

Injury affected Cartwright in 1991, and Cartwright was used as a reserve in two of the three Tests against New Zealand. Following the 1991 grand final victory, Cartwright travelled with the Penrith club to England for the 1991 World Club Challenge which was lost to Wigan.

Cartwright had his finest season of all in 1992. During the 1992 Great Britain Lions tour of Australia and New Zealand, Cartwright helped Australia retain The Ashes. Cartwright played in all three games for New South Wales (scoring a rare try in the third) and took over the Penrith captaincy when Greg Alexander was injured.

At the end of 1996, Cartwright left Penrith to play in England.

== Coaching career ==
After he finally retired as a player, Cartwright became an assistant coach at the Penrith club and the Sydney Roosters.

Cartwright began coaching at Penrith as the reserve coach in 2001. After a period as assistant to Ricky Stuart at the Sydney Roosters, as well as coaching the United States national rugby league team against the Kangaroos in 2004, Cartwright was appointed the inaugural coach of the Gold Coast Titans after their admission to the National Rugby League.

He became involved in a feud with Melbourne Storm winger Steve Turner over contractual obligations. "We flew him up, showed him around for two or three days and he agreed to me that he would come here, we shook hands. He looked me in the eye. The deal was done. He even started looking for accommodation. I only coached him in a couple of games at Penrith and my reaction has been the same as it would be for any player in this situation. But to do what he has done . . . I'm not happy. I'm extremely disappointed, to say the least."

In 2009, he was selected to coach the NSW Country Origin side. He later guided to the Gold Coast to consecutive finals appearances in the 2009 NRL season and the 2010 NRL season, the latter of which saw the Gold Coast reach the preliminary final. In 2011, the Gold Coast claimed their first Wooden Spoon under Cartwright's coaching.

After four years without making the finals, on 5 August 2014 he announced that he would stand down as head coach of the Gold Coast, with immediate effect. He would coach the club one last time against the Sydney Roosters in Round 22 before Neil Henry taking over on an interim basis.

In February 2015, Cartwright joined the North Queensland Cowboys as an assistant to head coach Paul Green.

On 4 October 2015, Cartwright was a member of North Queensland's coaching staff in the side's 17-16 Grand Final victory over the Brisbane Broncos.

In the weeks following the Grand Final win, Cartwright quit the North Queensland club and returned to Sydney as an assistant coach of the Manly-Warringah Sea Eagles.

Following the 2020 NRL season, Cartwright was announced as an assistant coach for the Brisbane Broncos, working under their new head coach Kevin Walters. On 22 May 2024, Cartwright was named as the new head coach of English side Hull F.C. ahead of the 2025 Super League season. Cartwright guided Hull F.C. to a 7th placed finish in the 2025 Super League season which saw the club narrowly miss out on the playoffs.

In April 2026, Cartwright stood down as Hull F.C. head coach effective immediately and was replaced with assistant Andy Last. It was reported the move happened after Cartwright stated in a press conference following their loss to St Helens that he felt betrayed and disrespected by the club. The Hull club issued a statement confirming the departure but said Cartwright would remain an employee of the team.

On 19 May 2026, it was announced that Cartwright was appointed as head coach of Catalans Dragons for the remainder of the 2026 Super League season.

== Personal life ==
Cartwright is the uncle of former Parramatta Eels player Bryce Cartwright. Cartwright's son is Jed Cartwright who plays for Super League club St Helens
