= Jack Charles (rugby league) =

English professional rugby league footballer

Personal information
- Full name: Jack Charles
- Born: 30 January 2006 (age 20) Salford, Greater Manchester, England
- Height: 5 ft 10 in (1.78 m)
- Weight: 12 st 2 lb (77 kg)

Playing information
- Position: Scrum-half, Stand-off
Club
Years	Team	Pld	T	G	FG	P
2024–25	Hull FC	23	0	32	0	64
2025(loan)	→ Doncaster	3	1	0	0	4
2026–	Hull Kingston Rovers	4	2	0	0	8
2026 (loan)	→ Goole Vikings	2	1	0	0	4
	Total	32	4	32	0	80
- Source: As of 11 September 2026
- Father: Chris Charles

Jack Charles (born 30 January 2006) is an English professional rugby league footballer who plays as a scrum-half or stand-off for Hull Kingston Rovers in the Betfred Super League.

He previously played for Hull FC in the Super League and spent time on loan from Hull at Doncaster in the RFL Championship.

== Background ==
Charles was born in Salford, Greater Manchester, England. His father Chris Charles is a former professional rugby league footballer.

He played for the Beverley Braves as a junior.

Charles joined FC's Academy system, and played in their under 18s side in the 2023 season.

He played for the Yorkshire Origin side and the England Academy side.

== Career ==
=== Hull FC ===
Charles made his professional debut for Hull FC in March 2024 against the London Broncos in the Super League.

=== Doncaster (loan) ===
He spent time on loan from Hull at Doncaster in the 2025 RFL Championship.

=== Hull KR ===
Charles joined arch rivals Hull KR on a four-year deal ahead of the 2026 Super League season.

=== Goole Vikings (loan) ===
On 18 June 2026 it was reported that he had signed for Goole Vikings in the RFL Championship on loan
