= Yusuf Aydin =

Turkey international rugby league footballer

Personal information
- Full name: Yusuf George Aydin
- Born: 13 September 2000 (age 25) Wakefield, West Yorkshire, England
- Height: 6 ft 1 in (1.85 m)
- Weight: 15 st 10 lb (100 kg)

Playing information
- Position: Prop
Club
Years	Team	Pld	T	G	FG	P
2020–22	Wakefield Trinity	30	2	0	0	8
2021(loan)	→ York City Knights	3	0	0	0	0
2022(loan)	→ Sheffield Eagles	4	0	0	0	0
2022(loan)	→ Leeds Rhinos	1	0	0	0	0
2023–24	Hull KR	9	0	0	0	0
2023(loan)	→Featherstone Rovers	2	0	0	0	0
2024(DR)	→Featherstone Rovers	3	0	0	0	0
2024(loan)	→Hull F.C.	2	0	0	0	0
2024–	Hull F.C.	10	1	0	0	0
	Total	64	3	0	0	8
Representative
Years	Team	Pld	T	G	FG	P
2019–	Turkey	1	0	0	0	0
- Source: As of 8 May 2024

Yusuf Aydin (born 13 September 2000) is a Turkish international rugby league footballer who plays as a prop for Hull FC in the Super League.

He has previous spent time on loan from Leeds at Wakefield Trinity in the Super League.

== Background ==
Aydin was born in Wakefield, West Yorkshire, England and is of Turkish heritage.

== Club Career ==
=== Wakefield Trinity ===
Aydin made his professional debut in round 12 of the 2020 Super League season for Wakefield against Hull FC.

==== Featherstone Rovers (loan) ====
On 5 April 2023 he join Featherstone Rovers on a short-term loan deal.

==== Featherstone Rovers (DR) ====
On 12 April 2024 he had signed for Featherstone Rovers in the RFL Championship on DR loan.

==== Hull F.C. (loan) ====
On 24 April 2024 he signed for Hull F.C. in the Super League on short-term loan

=== Hull F.C. ===
On 8 May 2024 he signed for Hull F.C. in the Super League on a two-year deal, making the existing loan deal a permanent move, in a swap with Jack Brown.

== International Career ==
Aydin is a Turkish international.
