= Jack Brown (rugby league) =

English rugby league footballer (born 2000)

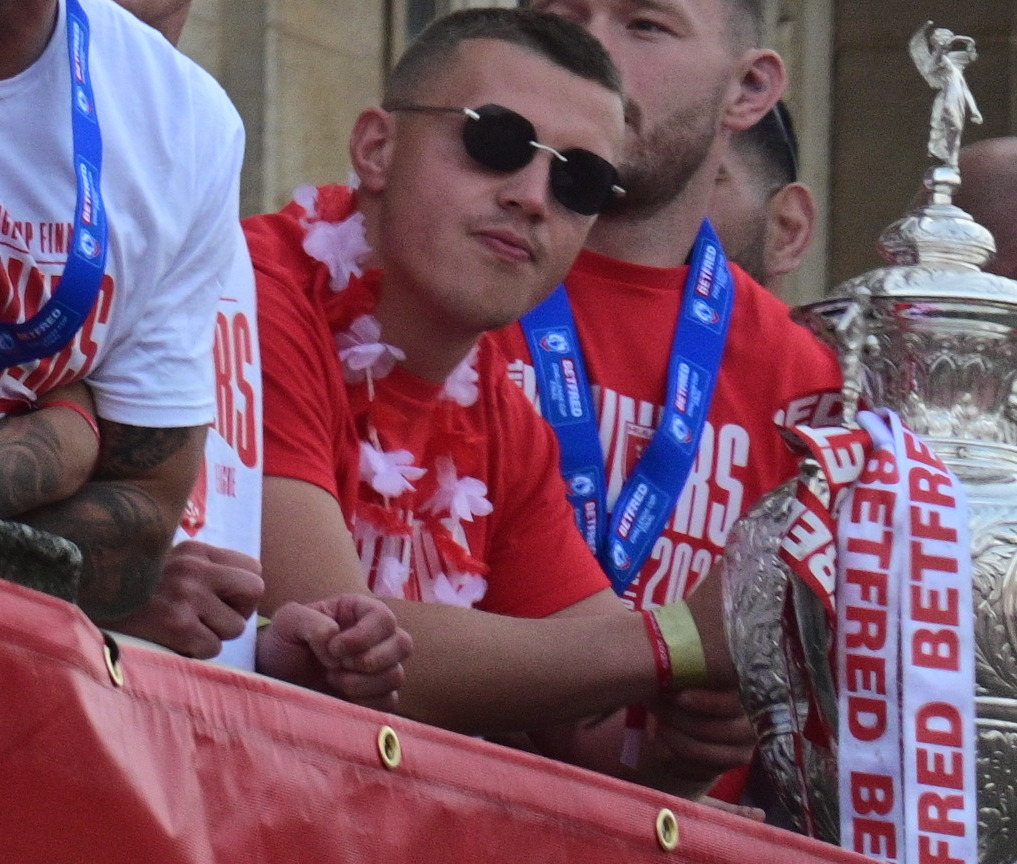
- Brown in 2025

Personal information
- Born: 25 June 2000 (age 25) Hull, East Riding of Yorkshire, England
- Height: 5 ft 10 in (1.78 m)
- Weight: 15 st 13 lb (101 kg)

Playing information
- Position: Loose forward, Prop
Club
Years	Team	Pld	T	G	FG	P
2019–24	Hull FC	73	6	0	0	24
2019(loan)	→ Doncaster	10	1	0	0	4
2020(loan)	→ Bradford Bulls	1	0	0	0	0
2024–26	Hull Kingston Rovers	32	2	0	0	8
2024(DR)	→ Featherstone Rovers	1	0	0	0	0
2026–	Castleford Tigers	1	1	0	0	4
	Total	118	10	0	0	40
- Source: As of 13 June 2026

Jack Brown (born 25 June 2000) is an English professional rugby league footballer who plays as a loose forward or prop for Castleford Tigers in the Super League.

He has previously played for Hull FC and Hull Kingston Rovers in the Super League. He has spent time on loan or dual registration at Doncaster in League 1, and at Bradford Bulls and Featherstone Rovers in the Championship.

== Background ==
Brown was born in Kingston upon Hull, East Riding of Yorkshire, England.

== Playing career ==
=== Hull F.C. ===
In 2019 he made his Super League début for Hull F.C. against the Catalans Dragons, scoring a try as he helped his team onto a narrow 31-30 victory.

Brown featured in 18 matches for Hull F.C. in the 2023 Super League season as the club finished 10th on the table.

=== Hull Kingston Rovers ===
On 8 May 2024 it was reported that he had signed for Hull Kingston Rovers in the Super League on a two-year deal, in a swap with Yusuf Aydin, until the end of 2026.

On 7 June 2025, Brown played in Hull Kingston Rovers 8-6 Challenge Cup final victory over Warrington. It was the club's first major trophy in 40 years.

On 1 June 2026, Hull KR announced Brown had departed the club with immediate effect to take up an opportunity with another Super League side.

=== Castleford Tigers ===
In May 2026, Love Rugby League speculated that Brown would join Castleford Tigers in the Super League with immediate effect. It had previously been reported that he had signed for Castleford from the 2027 season already, but this was brought forward to allow Tevita Pangai Junior to join Hull KR within the salary cap. On 2 June, Castleford announced his arrival on a two-and-a-half-year deal.
