= Davy Litten =

English rugby league footballer

Personal information
- Full name: Davy Litten
- Born: 3 May 2003 (age 23) Hull, East Riding of Yorkshire, England
- Height: 6 ft 3 in (1.90 m)
- Weight: 13 st 5 lb (85 kg)

Playing information
- Position: Fullback, Wing
Club
| Years | Team | Pld | T | G | FG | P |
|---|---|---|---|---|---|---|
| 2022–26 | Hull FC | 73 | 25 | 0 | 0 | 100 |
| 2022(loan) | → Whitehaven | 6 | 2 | 0 | 0 | 8 |
| 2024(loan) | → York Knights | 2 | 1 | 0 | 0 | 4 |
| 2027– | Wakefield Trinity | 0 | 0 | 0 | 0 | 0 |
| | Total | 81 | 28 | 0 | 0 | 112 |
- Source: As of 22 September 2026
- Relatives: Jez Litten (cousin)

Davy Litten (born 3 May 2003) is an English professional rugby league footballer who plays as a fullback and centre for Wakefield Trinity in the Super League.

== Playing career ==
=== Hull F.C. ===
In 2022 he made his Hull FC début in the Super League against Wakefield Trinity. Litten played 15 matches for Hull F.C. in the Super League XXVIII season as the club finished 10th on the table. Litten played 22 matches for Hull F.C. in the 2025 Super League season as the club finished 7th on the table.

=== York Knights (loan) ===
On 16 May 2024 it was reported that he had signed for York Knights in the RFL Championship on loan

=== Wakefield Trinity ===
On 10 August 2026 it was reported that he had signed for Wakefield Trinity in the Super League on a four-year deal.
