= Harvey Barron =

English rugby league footballer

Personal information
- Full name: Harvey Barron
- Born: 13 May 2003 (age 23) Hull, East Riding of Yorkshire, England
- Height: 6 ft 3 in (1.90 m)
- Weight: 13 st 1 lb (83 kg)

Playing information
- Position: Wing
Club
Years	Team	Pld	T	G	FG	P
2022–	Hull FC	60	36	0	0	144
2022(loan)	→ Whitehaven	3	1	0	0	4
	Total	63	37	0	0	148
- Source: As of 7 September 2022

Harvey Barron (born 13 May 2003) is an English professional rugby league footballer who plays as a winger for Hull F.C. in the Super League.

In 2022 he made his Hull début in the Super League against Toulouse Olympique.
