= Lewis Martin (rugby league) =

English rugby player

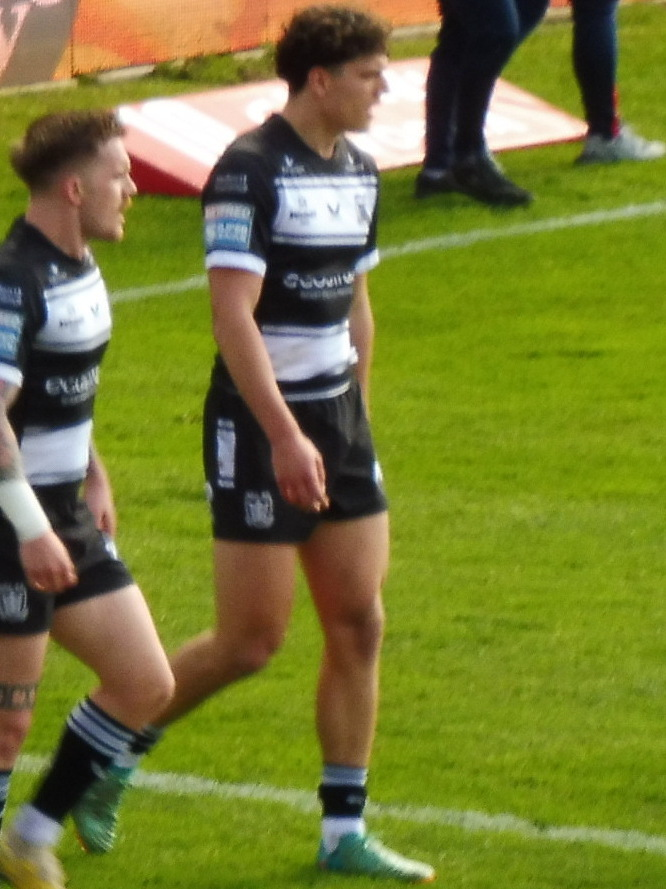

Personal information
- Full name: Lewis Martin
- Born: 19 August 2004 (age 22) Hull, East Riding of Yorkshire, England
- Height: 6 ft 1 in (1.85 m)
- Weight: 14 st 13 lb (95 kg)

Playing information
- Position: Wing
Club
Years	Team	Pld	T	G	FG	P
2023–	Hull FC	74	51	0	0	204
- Source: As of 8 October 2025

Lewis Martin (born 19 August 2004) is an English professional rugby league footballer who plays as a winger for Hull F.C. in the Super League.

Martin initially planned to become a footballer and was signed to Hull City A.F.C. at the age of nine. After being released by the club at age 15, he switched to rugby league and was offered a scholarship by Hull F.C.

In 2023 he made his Hull début in the Super League against St Helens in a 30-12 loss scoring a try.

Martin was the top scorer for Hull F.C. in the 2024 season, scoring 9 tries.

In 2025, Hull F.C. drew Wigan Warriors in the round of 16 of the Challenge Cup. Martin scored a hat-trick to help win the game.
