= Denive Balmforth =

Wales international rugby league footballer

Den Balmforth
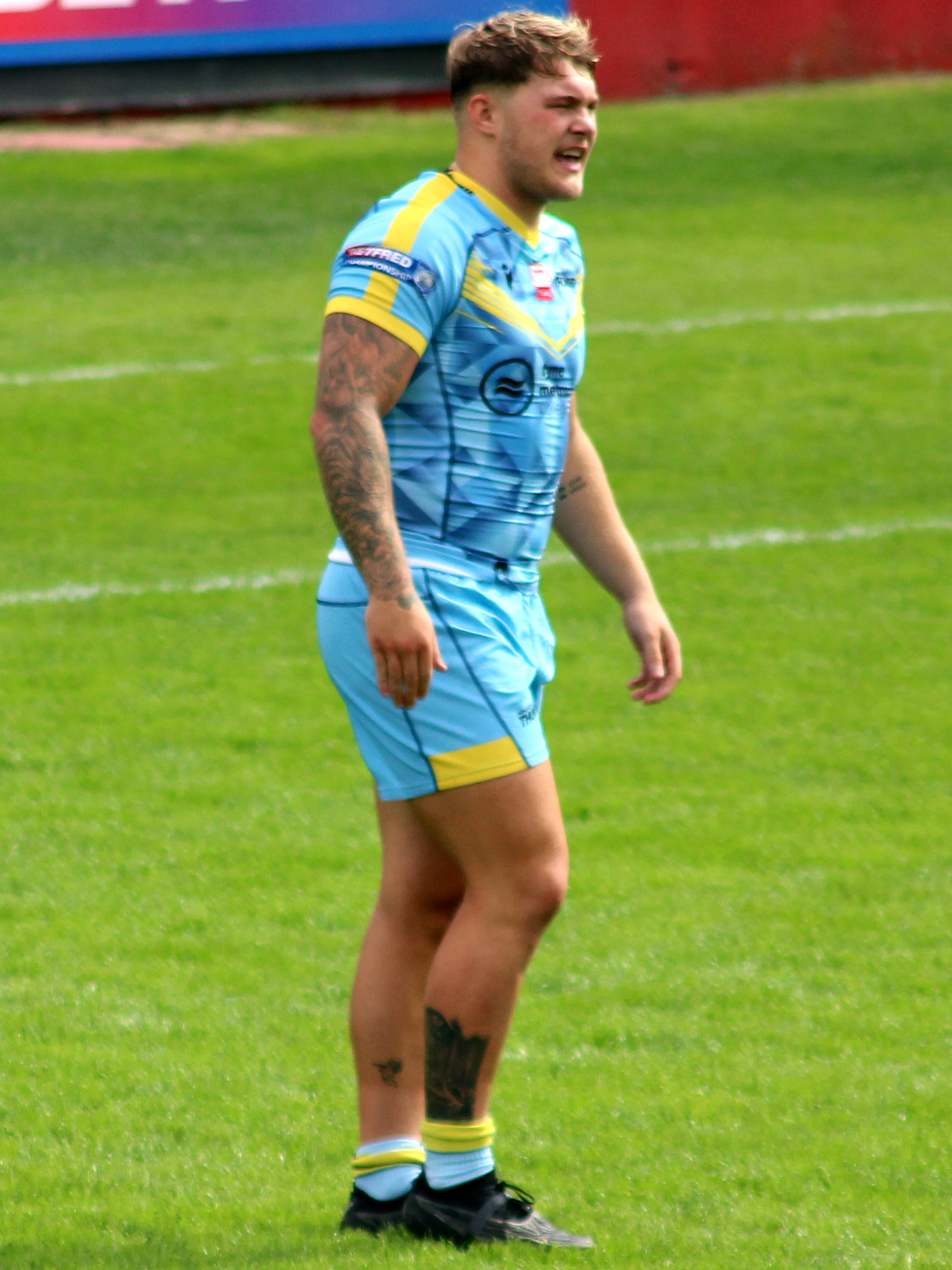

Personal information
- Full name: Denive Balmforth
- Born: 1 October 2003 (age 23) Leeds, West Yorkshire, England
- Height: 5 ft 11 in (1.80 m)
- Weight: 15 st 4 lb (97 kg)

Playing information
- Position: Hooker, Loose forward
Club
Years	Team	Pld	T	G	FG	P
2022–	Hull FC	30	7	0	0	28
2023(loan)	→ Newcastle Thunder	26	6	0	0	24
2024(loan)	→ Swinton Lions	1	1	0	0	4
2025(loan)	→ Catalans Dragons	10	3	0	0	12
2026(loan)	→ York Knights	27	7	0	0	28
	Total	94	24	0	0	96
Representative
Years	Team	Pld	T	G	FG	P
2025–	Wales	2	1	0	0	4
- Source: As of 20 October 2026

Denive Balmforth (born 1 October 2003) is a Wales international rugby league footballer who plays as a hooker or loose forward for Hull FC in the Super League.

== Playing career ==
=== Hull FC ===
In 2022, he made his Hull FC début in the Super League against Toulouse Olympique.

=== Swinton Lions (loan) ===
On 25 May 2024 it was reported that he had joined Swinton Lions on short term loan.

=== Catalans Dragons (loan) ===
On 25 June 2025 he joined the Catalans Dragons on loan.

Hull FC recalled him on 8 September 2025, ready for the forthcoming clash with Warrington Wolves at the weekend.

In October 2025 he was selected for the Wales squad for their matches against Ireland.

=== York Knights (loan) ===
In October 2025 it was announced he would be joining super league newcomers York Knights for the 2026 season.

=== International ===
He made his international debut for Wales, starting at halfback, in the 24-0 win over Ireland in Neath on 25 October 2025 in the two-match series.
