= Simon Grix =

Rugby league coach and former international footballer

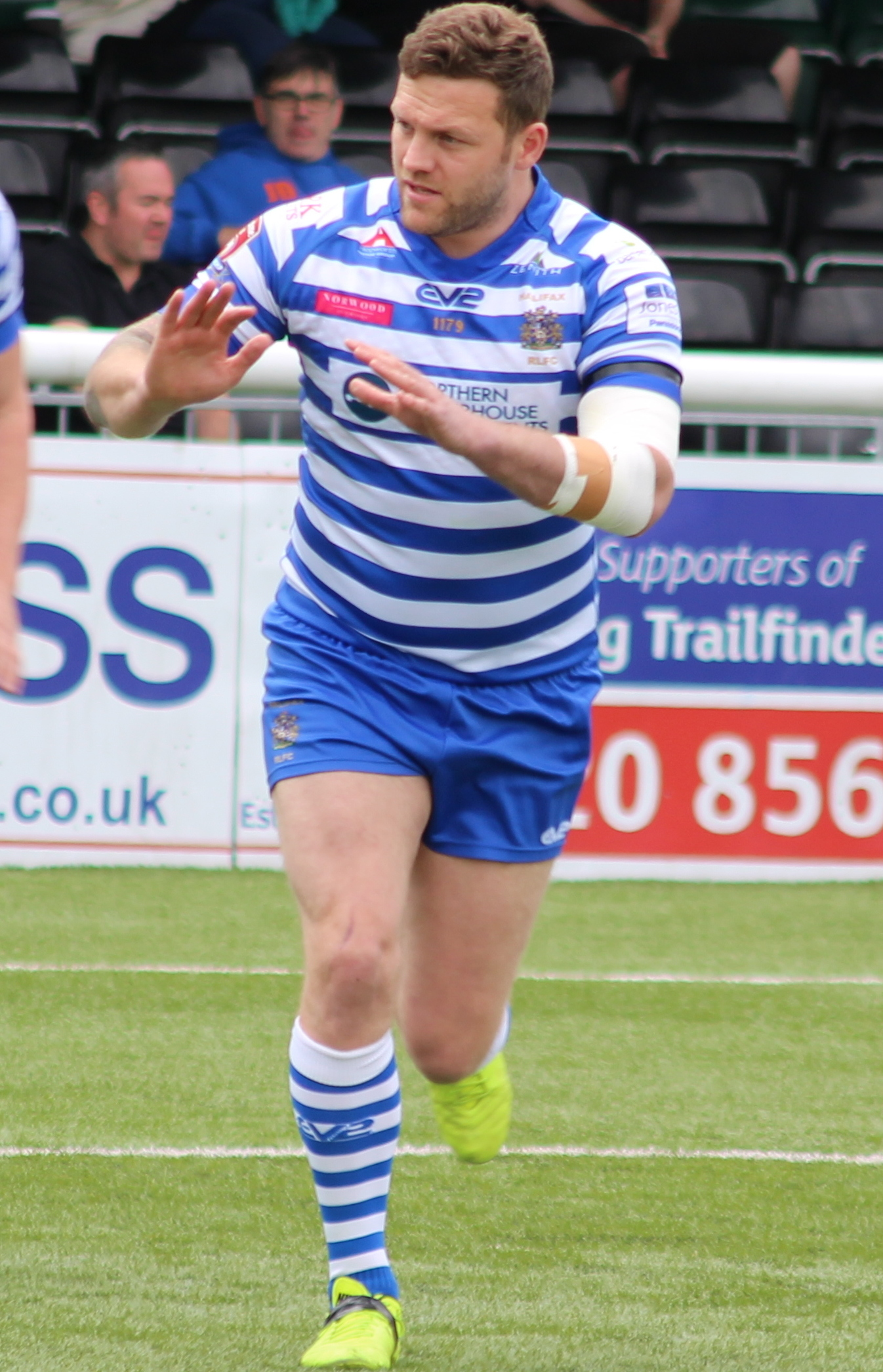

Personal information
- Full name: Simon David Grix
- Born: 28 September 1985 (age 41) Halifax, West Yorkshire, England
- Height: 5 ft 11 in (1.80 m)
- Weight: 14 st 7 lb (92 kg)

Playing information
- Position: Loose forward, Second-row, Centre, Stand-off
Club
Years	Team	Pld	T	G	FG	P
2003–04	Halifax RLFC	29	6	0	0	24
2006–15	Warrington Wolves	164	47	0	0	188
2016–18	Halifax Panthers	51	6	0	0	20
	Total	244	59	0	0	232
Representative
Years	Team	Pld	T	G	FG	P
2010	Ireland	2	0	0	0	0

Coaching information
Club
Years	Team	Gms	W	D	L	W%
2019–23	Halifax Panthers	29	9	1	19	31
2024 (Interim)	Hull FC	20	2	0	18	10
	Total	49	11	1	37	22
- Source: As of 22 Sep 2024
- Relatives: Scott Grix (brother); Michael Collins (cousin)

Simon Grix (born 28 September 1985) is a professional rugby league coach who is an assistant coach for Castleford Tigers in the Super League and a former professional rugby league footballer.

He is a former Ireland international rugby league footballer who played as a second-row forward for Halifax in the Championship and was the team's manager from May 2019 to Oct 2023. He served as Hull FC's interim coach in the 2024 Super League season.

== Background ==
Grix was born in Halifax, West Yorkshire, England.

== Playing career ==
=== Halifax ===
Grix began his career at Halifax spending the 2003 and 2004 seasons at the club.

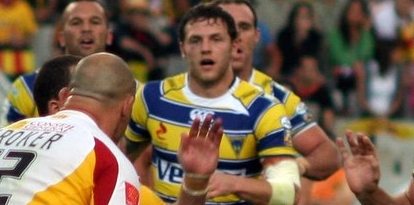
Grix playing for the Warrington Wolves

=== Warrington Wolves ===
In 2006 he joined the Warrington Wolves in the Super League.

He missed out on selection through injury for three Challenge Cup Finals.

He played in the 2012 Super League Grand Final defeat to the Leeds Rhinos at Old Trafford.

He played in the 2013 Super League Grand Final defeat to the Wigan Warriors at Old Trafford.

=== Halifax Panthers ===
After 10 years at the Halliwell Jones Stadium he returned to Halifax.

=== International career ===
He was mooted for a call-up to the Ireland squad for the 2008 Rugby League World Cup, and was named in the Ireland training squad but did not make the final side.

He eventually made his Ireland début in 2010.

He was named in their squad for the 2013 Rugby League World Cup but was ruled out by injury prior to the tournament and was replaced by Matty Hadden.

== Coaching career ==
On 22 May 2019, it was announced that Grix would become the head coach of Halifax Panthers in the RFL Championship following a successful stint as interim.

In the 2021 Championship season, Grix guided Halifax to a third placed finish which qualified them for the playoffs. After defeating Whitehaven in the first week, Halifax travelled to Featherstone with the winner to play Toulouse Olympique in the Million Pound Game. Halifax would lose the match 42-10 which ended their season.

He took over the role of interim head coach following the sacking of Tony Smith on 11 Apr 2024

== Personal life ==
He is the younger brother of the rugby league footballer; Scott Grix, and cousin of the association footballer and manager; Michael Collins.
