= Jack Ashworth =

English rugby league footballer (born 1995)

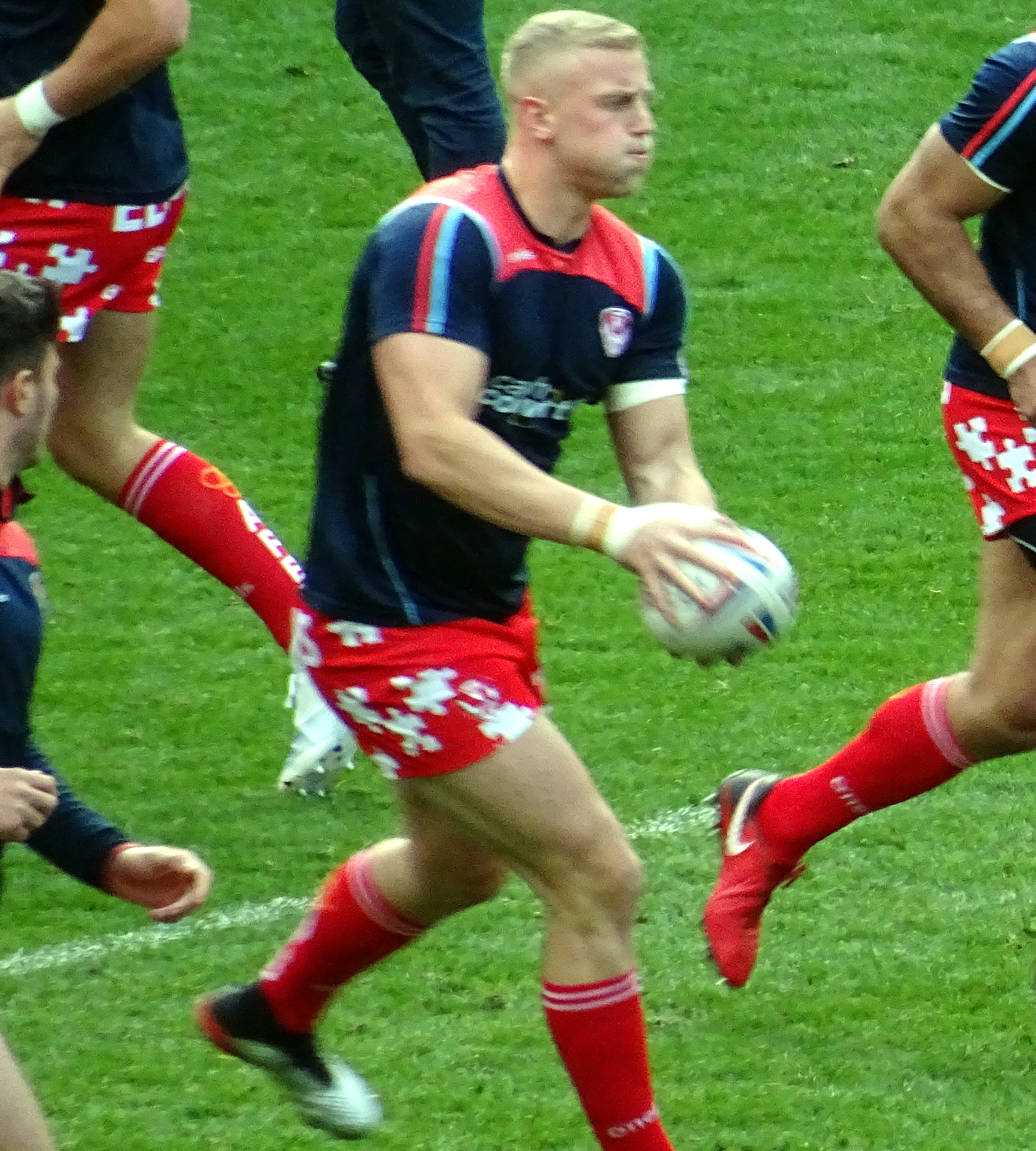

Personal information
- Born: 3 July 1995 (age 31) Rochdale, Greater Manchester, England
- Height: 6 ft 3 in (1.91 m)
- Weight: 16 st 3 lb (103 kg)

Playing information
- Position: Second-row, Prop
Club
Years	Team	Pld	T	G	FG	P
2015–20	St Helens	47	4	0	0	16
2015(loan)	→ Rochdale Hornets	11	3	0	0	12
2018(loan)	→ Sheffield Eagles	15	4	0	0	16
2019(DR)	→ Leigh Centurions	4	0	0	0	0
2021–23	Huddersfield Giants	28	1	0	0	4
2021(loan)	→ Leigh Centurions	5	0	0	0	0
2022(loan)	→ Halifax Panthers	1	0	0	0	0
2022(loan)	→ Featherstone Rovers	2	0	0	0	0
2024–25	Hull F.C.	41	2	0	0	8
2026	Castleford Tigers	10	2	0	0	8
2026(loan)	→ Doncaster R.L.F.C.	2	0	0	0	0
2026–	Leigh Leopards	0	0	0	0	0
	Total	166	16	0	0	64
Representative
Years	Team	Pld	T	G	FG	P
2019–	England Knights	1	0	0	0	0
- Source: As of 6 November 2026

Jack Ashworth (born 3 July 1995) is an English professional rugby league footballer who plays as a prop or second-row forward for Leigh Leopards in the Super League.

He has previously played for St Helens, Huddersfield Giants and Hull F.C. in the Super League. He has spent time on loan or dual registration at Rochdale Hornets in the Championship 1, and at Sheffield Eagles, Leigh Centurions, Halifax Panthers, Featherstone Rovers and Doncaster R.L.F.C. in the RFL Championship.

He has represented England Knights at international level.

== Background ==
Jack Ashworth was born in Rochdale, Greater Manchester, England, On Monday 3rd July 1995.

== Education ==
Jack Ashworth attended St Cuthbert's RC Business and Enterprise College in Rochdale from 2006 until 2011. He then went on to do a sports course at Hopwood Hall College, Middleton.

== Career ==
=== St Helens ===
Ashworth made his Saints debut on 6 April 2015 in a Super League match against Hull F.C.

During 2015, Ashworth also played for Rochdale Hornets in the Championship 1 on dual registration.

In the 2016 season, Ashworth played an outstanding game against Warrington, and made a Man of the Match performance against Hull F.C.

Ashworth joined up with the Sheffield Eagles on dual registration on 31 January 2018, ahead of their first Championship match against Dewsbury.

He played in the 2019 Challenge Cup final defeat by Warrington at Wembley Stadium.

He played in the 2019 Super League Grand Final victory over Salford at Old Trafford.

=== Huddersfield Giants ===
On 30 November 2020, it was announced that Ashworth had signed a two-year deal with Huddersfield.

==== Leigh Centurions (loan) ====
On 11 July 2021, it was reported that he had signed for Leigh in the Super League on season-long loan.

In round 17 of the 2021 Super League season, he was sent off for fighting in Leigh's 50–6 loss against Wigan.

=== Hull F.C. ===
On 5 October 2023, it was reported that he had signed for Hull F.C. for the 2024 season on a two-year deal.

On 10 September 2025, Ashworth was suspended for seven matches after being found guilty by the match tribunal for striking Hull Kingston Rovers player Mikey Lewis in the face during Hull F.C.'s derby loss.

=== Castleford Tigers ===
On 28 September 2025, it was announced that Ashworth had signed for Castleford Tigers in the Super League on a two-year deal.

==== Doncaster (loan) ====
On 23 June 2026, Ashworth joined Doncaster R.L.F.C. in the RFL Championship on a one-month loan. He made two appearances before being recalled by Castleford.

=== Leigh Leopards ===
On 18 August 2026 it was reported that he had signed for Leigh Leopards in the Super League

== International career ==
In 2019, he was selected for the England Knights against Jamaica at Headingley Rugby Stadium.
