= Herman Ese'ese =

New Zealand and Samoa international rugby league footballer

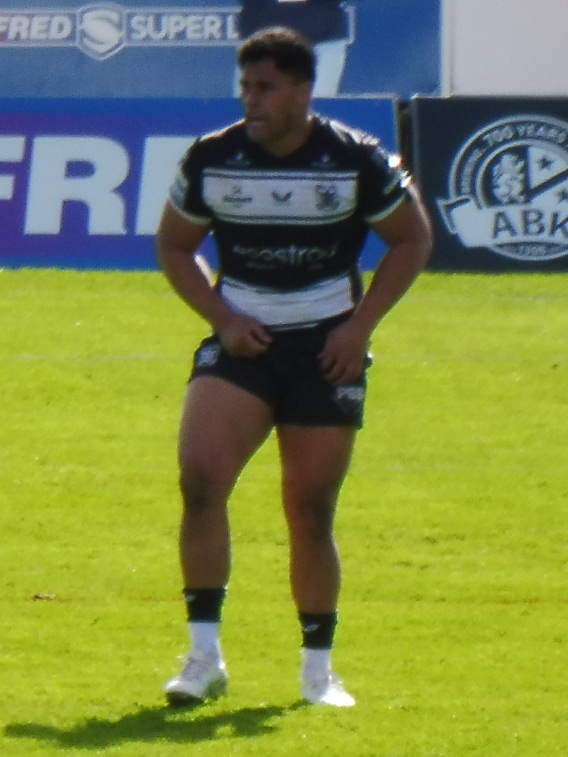

Personal information
- Full name: Herman Ese'ese
- Born: 7 September 1994 (age 32) Auckland, New Zealand
- Height: 6 ft 2 in (1.87 m)
- Weight: 18 st 10 lb (119 kg)

Playing information
- Position: Prop, Loose forward
Club
Years	Team	Pld	T	G	FG	P
2015	Canterbury Bulldogs	1	0	0	0	0
2016–17	Brisbane Broncos	30	1	0	0	4
2018–20	Newcastle Knights	62	5	0	0	20
2021–22	Gold Coast Titans	16	2	0	0	8
2023	Dolphins	20	0	0	0	0
2024–	Hull F.C.	65	12	0	0	48
	Total	194	20	0	0	80
Representative
Years	Team	Pld	T	G	FG	P
2016	Queensland Residents	1	0	0	0	0
2017–19	Samoa	6	0	0	0	0
2018	New Zealand	1	0	0	0	0
- Source: As of 12 August 2026

Herman Ese'ese (born 7 September 1994) is a professional rugby league footballer who plays as a prop and loose forward for Hull F.C. in the Super League. He has also played for both New Zealand and Samoa at international level.

He previously played for the Canterbury-Bankstown Bulldogs, Brisbane Broncos, Newcastle Knights, Gold Coast Titans and the Dolphins in the NRL in Australia.

== Background ==
Ese'ese was born in Auckland, New Zealand. He is of Samoan descent and is the nephew of New Zealand Kiwis international Ali Lauiti'iti.

Ese'ese played his junior rugby league for the Mangere East Hawks and Wests Panthers, before being signed by the Canterbury-Bankstown Bulldogs in 2015.

== Playing career ==
=== Canterbury-Bankstown Bulldogs (2013-2015) ===
In 2013 and 2014, Ese'ese played for the Canterbury-Bankstown Bulldogs' NYC team.

In 2015, Ese'ese graduated to the Canterbury-Bankstown Bulldogs' New South Wales Cup team. In Round 7 of the 2015 NRL season, he made his NRL debut for the Canterbury-Bankstown club against the Manly Warringah Sea Eagles. He was contracted to the Bulldogs until the end of 2016, however, after being stood down in April due to a drink driving charge, he was released from the final year of his contract. Late in the year, he signed with the Souths Logan Magpies in the Queensland Cup for 2016, while training with the Brisbane Broncos during the 2016 pre-season.

=== Brisbane Broncos (2016-2017) ===
In 2016, after gaining a contract with the Brisbane Broncos during the pre-season, Ese'ese made his Brisbane debut against South Sydney in Round 8 of the season. In September, he re-signed with the Brisbane club on a two-year contract until the end of 2018.

Ese’ese earned a starting spot at prop over Korbin Sims in some matches. On 6 May, Ese’ese made his international debut for Samoa against England, playing off the interchange bench in the 30–10 loss at Campbelltown Stadium.

=== Newcastle Knights (2018-2020) ===
In July 2017, he signed a three-year contract with the Newcastle Knights starting in 2018. In round 25, he scored his first ever NRL try against the Parramatta Eels, in Brisbane's 34–52 loss at Suncorp Stadium.

In round 1 of the 2018 season, Ese'ese made his debut for Newcastle in their 19–18 golden point extra-time win over the Manly Warringah Sea Eagles.

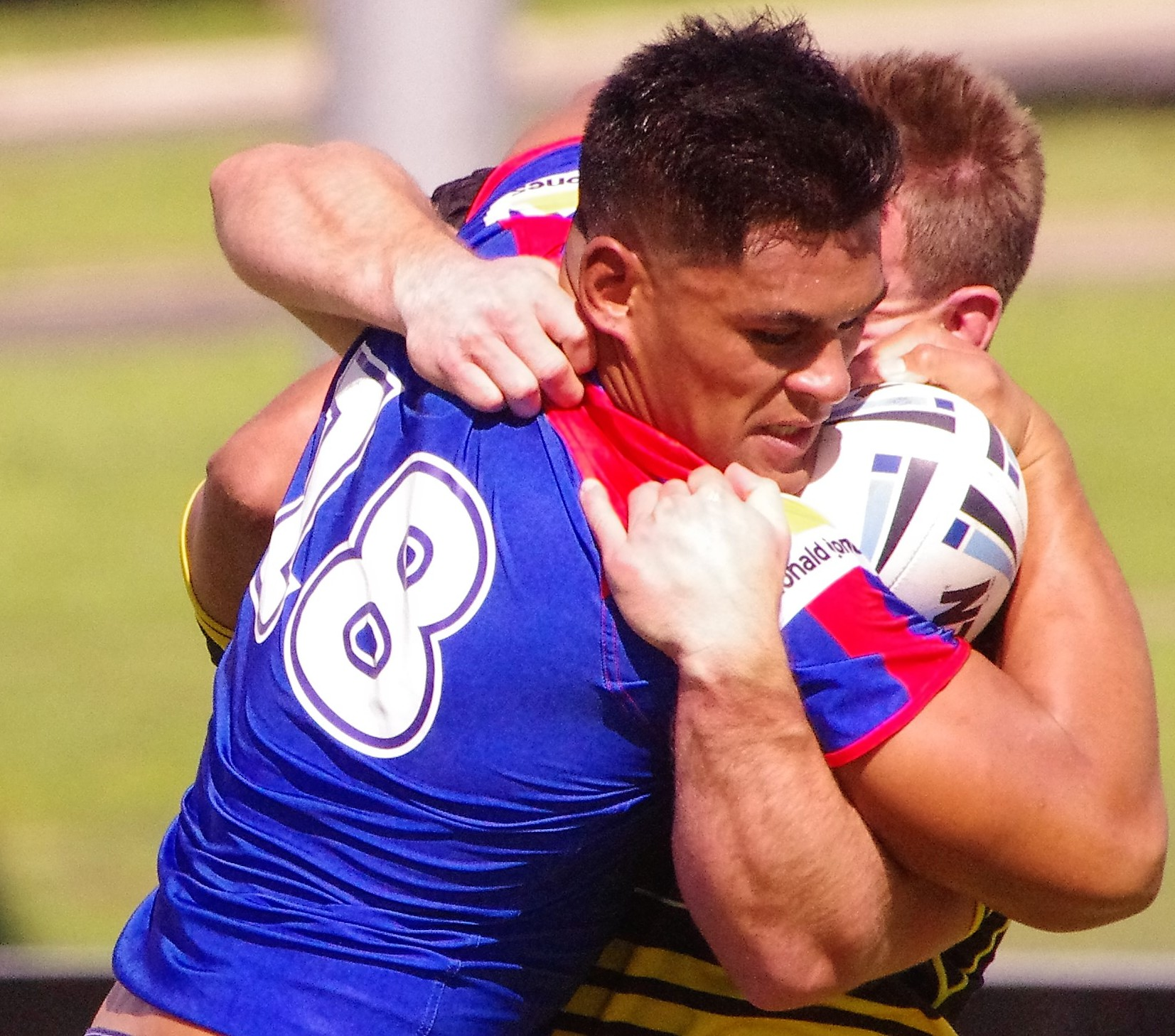
Ese'ese hitting the ball up for Newcastle in 2019

In the 2019 NRL season, Ese'ese played 18 games for Newcastle as the club finished 11th on the table for a second consecutive year.

=== Gold Coast Titans (2021-2022) ===
In July 2020, Ese'ese signed a two-year contract with the Gold Coast Titans starting in 2021. In round 10 of the 2021 NRL season, he was sent off for a high tackle during the Gold Coast's 48–12 loss against Penrith.

Following the Gold Coast's decision not to extend Ese'ese's contract, former coach from the Brisbane Broncos, Wayne Bennett signed him to the Dolphins for the 2023 NRL season. He played a total of 13 games for the Gold Coast in the 2022 NRL season as the club finished 13th on the table.

=== Dolphins (2023) ===
In round 5 of the 2023 NRL season, Ese'ese made his club debut for the Dolphins against the St George Illawarra Dragons at WIN Stadium. He played a total of twenty games for the Dolphins.

=== Hull F.C. ===
On 15 August 2023, Ese'ese signed a three-year deal to join English side Hull F.C. starting in 2024. Ese'ese made his club debut for Hull F.C. against arch-rivals Hull Kingston Rovers in round 1 of the 2024 Super League season. He was sent to the sin bin during the first half of the match for a dangerous high tackle. Hull F.C. would go on to lose the match 22–0. On 28 March 2025, Ese'ese extended his contract with Hull F.C. until the end of 2029. Following the victory over Warrington Wolves in April 2025, Ese'ese equalled the record number for tries scored in consecutive games scored by a prop, scoring 6 games in a row. He played 24 games for Hull F.C. in the 2025 Super League season as the club finished 7th on the table.

== Statistics ==
Year	Team	Games	Tries	Pts
2015	Canterbury-Bankstown Bulldogs	1		
2016	Brisbane Broncos	8		
2017	Brisbane Broncos	22	1	4
2018	Newcastle Knights	23	2	8
2019	Newcastle Knights	18	2	8
2020	Newcastle Knights	21	1	4
2021	Gold Coast Titans	3		
2022	Gold Coast Titans	13	2	8
2023	Dolphins	20		
2024	Hull FC	22	2	8
2025	Hull FC	14	8	32
	Totals	167	18	52
