= Jed Cartwright =

Australian rugby league footballer

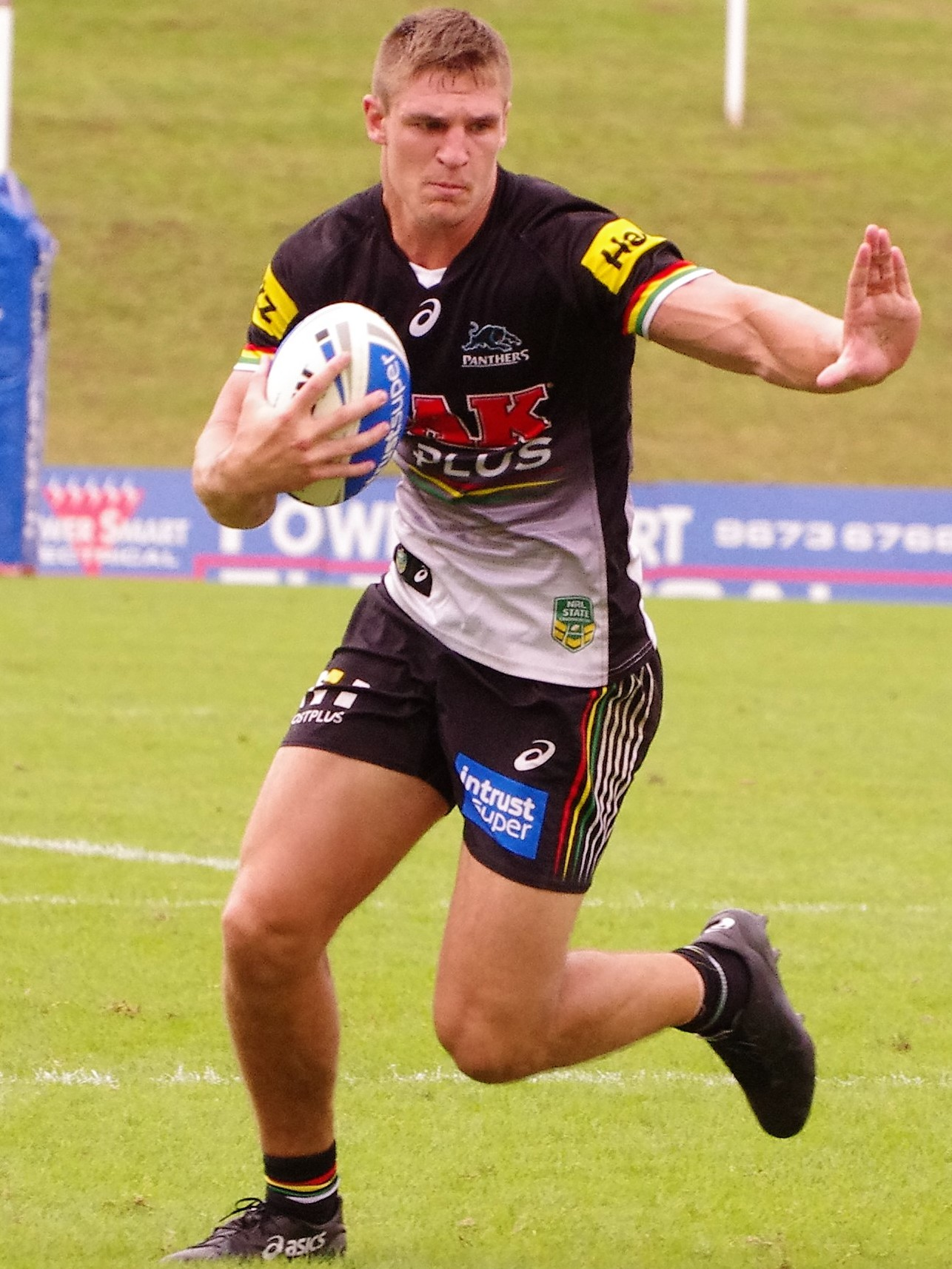

Personal information
- Born: 24 October 1996 (age 30) Sydney, New South Wales, Australia
- Height: 6 ft 4 in (1.94 m)
- Weight: 16 st 5 lb (104 kg)

Playing information
- Position: Second-row, Centre, Loose forward
Club
Years	Team	Pld	T	G	FG	P
2019	Penrith Panthers	1	0	0	0	0
2020–23	South Sydney	30	1	0	0	4
2024	Newcastle Knights	3	0	0	0	0
2024–	Hull FC	23	7	0	0	28
2026(loan)	→ St Helens	3	1	0	0	4
	Total	60	9	0	0	36
- Source: As of 6 November 2026
- Father: John Cartwright
- Relatives: Bryce Cartwright (cousin)

Jed Cartwright (born 24 October 1996) is an Australian professional rugby league footballer who plays as a second-row forward for St Helens, on one-month loan from Hull FC in the Super League.

He previously played for the Penrith Panthers, South Sydney Rabbitohs and the Newcastle Knights in the National Rugby League, playing as a centre earlier in his career.

== Background ==
Cartwright was born in Sydney, Australia and is the son of former Penrith, Australian international and NSW Origin player John Cartwright, he is also the cousin of former Gold Coast Titans player and former Panther Bryce Cartwright.

He played his junior rugby league for the Warragamba Wombats.

== Playing career ==
=== Penrith Panthers ===
Cartwright made his first grade debut for Penrith against his cousin Bryce Cartwright in round 17 of the 2019 NRL season against the Gold Coast Titans which ended in a 24–2 victory at Penrith Park.

=== South Sydney Rabbitohs ===
After signing for South Sydney in 2020, he made his club debut in round 18 of the 2020 NRL season against the Wests Tigers. The following week against Canterbury-Bankstown, Cartwright appeared to have scored his first try in the top grade but he lost the ball over the try line in the second half of the match as South Sydney suffered a 26-16 shock defeat at ANZ Stadium. In round 9 of the 2021 NRL season, Cartwright made his first start of the year for South Sydney in a 50-0 loss against Melbourne at Stadium Australia. Cartwright was limited to only five matches for South Sydney in the 2022 NRL season. Cartwright was called into the South Sydney side as injury cover for their preliminary final against Penrith which Souths lost 32-12.

=== Newcastle Knights ===
On 2 August 2023, Cartwright signed a two-year deal to join the Newcastle Knights ahead of the 2024 NRL season.

=== Hull F.C. ===
On 6 June 2024, it was reported that he had signed for Hull F.C. in the Super League on a one-year deal.

=== St Helens (loan) ===
On 9 July 2026 it was reported that he had signed for St Helens on one-month loan In round 18 of the 2026 Super League season, Cartwright made his club debut for St Helens in their shock 46-0 loss against Toulouse Olympique.
