= Charlie Severs =

English rugby league footballer (born 2003)

Personal information
- Full name: Charlie Ray Severs
- Born: 1 October 2003 (age 22) York, North Yorkshire, England
- Height: 6 ft 1 in (1.86 m)
- Weight: 15 st 13 lb (101 kg)

Playing information
- Position: Second-row
Club
Years	Team	Pld	T	G	FG	P
2022–24	Hull FC	3	0	0	0	0
2024	→York Knights (loan)	6	2	0	0	8
	Total	9	2	0	0	8
- Source: As of 14 June 2025

Charlie Severs (born 1 October 2003) is an English professional rugby league footballer who played as a second-row forward for Hull F.C. in the Super League.

== Playing career ==
=== Hull FC ===
In 2022 he made his Hull début in the Super League against Hull Kingston Rovers. In September 2024, Severs announced medical retirement in 2024 after a string of lengthy injures.

=== York Knights (loan) ===
On 2 February 2024 it was reported that he had signed for York Knights in the RFL Championship on loan
